= 2001 Copa Bolivia =

Tournament details
- Country: Bolivia

Final positions
- Champions: Bolívar (4th title)
- Runners-up: Real Santa Cruz

This is the sixth edition of Copa Bolivia. This season have different format. Defending champions are The Strongest after beating in Montero 3-1 Guabirá. In the 2000 final occurred an incident when Guabira was losing 0-2 La Barra Brava of Guabira throw a lot of firework to The Strongest team and also the referee. Iberoamericana and Real Santa Cruz withdrawn from this tournament.

== First stage ==
=== Preliminary round ===
| Team 1 | Agg. | Team 2 | 1st leg | 2nd leg |
|---|---|---|---|---|
| Club Atlético Ciclón | 4–2 | Real Cochabamba | 3–2 | 1–0 |
| Real Cochabamba | 0–1 | Club Callejas | 0–0 | 0–1 |
| Municipal Real Mamoré | 5–3 | Club Callejas | 4–0 | 1–3 |
| Club Aurora' | 3–0 | Universitario de Pando | 1–1 | 2–0 |
| Club Bolivar Nimbles | 1–0 | Municipal de Tarija | 0–0 | 1–0 |
| Pando F.C | 1–3 | Club Stormers San Lorenzo | 1–0 | 0–3 |
| Always Ready | 2–4 | Club Destroyers | 1–2 | 1–2 |
| Deportivo Cristal | 2–1 | Mariscal Santa Cruz del Alto | 0–0 | 2–1 |

=== Second stage ===
Key to colours in group tables
Group winners and runners-up and third place advance to the third stage (For Pando and Tarija Winners and runner-up)
4th placed teams enter to the Loser's Round (For Pando and Tarija 3rd place).

==== La Paz ====
- Estadio Hernando Siles is the stadium chosen.
- Mariscal del alto Qualified as the best loser

| Pos | Team | Pld | W | D | L | GF | GA | GD | Pts |
|---|---|---|---|---|---|---|---|---|---|
| 1 | Bolivar | 7 | 7 | 0 | 0 | 36 | 10 | +26 | 21 |
| 2 | The Strongest | 7 | 5 | 2 | 0 | 24 | 10 | +14 | 17 |
| 3 | La Paz | 7 | 5 | 0 | 2 | 18 | 14 | +4 | 15 |
| 4 | Mariscal del Alto | 7 | 3 | 3 | 1 | 19 | 18 | +1 | 12 |
| 5 | Club Litoral | 7 | 2 | 2 | 3 | 12 | 19 | −7 | 8 |
| 6 | Chaco Petrolero | 7 | 1 | 3 | 3 | 18 | 29 | −11 | 6 |
| 7 | Fraternidad Tigres | 7 | 1 | 1 | 5 | 17 | 34 | −17 | 4 |
| 8 | Club Ayacucho | 7 | 0 | 1 | 6 | 18 | 18 | 0 | 1 |

==== Santa Cruz ====
- Estadio Ramón Tahuichi Aguilera is the stadium chosen.

| Pos | Team | Pld | W | D | L | GF | GA | GD | Pts |
|---|---|---|---|---|---|---|---|---|---|
| 1 | Oriente Petrolero | 7 | 6 | 1 | 0 | 19 | 8 | +11 | 19 |
| 2 | Club Blooming | 7 | 5 | 0 | 2 | 14 | 9 | +5 | 15 |
| 3 | Guabirá | 7 | 4 | 1 | 2 | 10 | 7 | +3 | 13 |
| 4 | Real Santa Cruz | 7 | 3 | 2 | 2 | 7 | 7 | 0 | 11 |
| 5 | Club Destroyers | 7 | 3 | 0 | 4 | 5 | 8 | −3 | 9 |
| 6 | 25 de Junio | 7 | 2 | 1 | 4 | 4 | 10 | −6 | 7 |
| 7 | Torno F.C. | 7 | 1 | 1 | 5 | 5 | 15 | −10 | 4 |
| 8 | Club Callejas | 7 | 0 | 2 | 5 | 3 | 15 | −12 | 2 |

=== Cochabamba ===
- Estadio Felix Capriles is the chosen stadium.

| Pos | Team | Pld | W | D | L | GF | GA | GD | Pts |
|---|---|---|---|---|---|---|---|---|---|
| 1 | Club Jorge Wilstermann | 7 | 5 | 2 | 0 | 15 | 7 | +8 | 17 |
| 2 | Universitario (CBBA) | 7 | 5 | 0 | 2 | 14 | 6 | +8 | 15 |
| 3 | Club Aurora | 7 | 4 | 2 | 1 | 15 | 10 | +5 | 14 |
| 4 | Club Enrique Happ | 6 | 3 | 2 | 1 | 13 | 11 | +2 | 11 |
| 5 | Cochabamba de CBBA | 7 | 3 | 1 | 3 | 12 | 12 | 0 | 10 |
| 6 | Frontanilla | 6 | 3 | 0 | 3 | 11 | 15 | −4 | 9 |
| 7 | Racing (Cochabamba) | 6 | 3 | 0 | 3 | 9 | 16 | −7 | 9 |
| 8 | Nueva Cliza | 6 | 3 | 0 | 3 | 8 | 16 | −8 | 9 |

=== Tarija ===
- Tarija and Pando would only have six teams because of the Bolivian Football Clubs Ranking.
- Estadio IV Centenário would host all the matches.

| Pos | Team | Pld | W | D | L | GF | GA | GD | Pts |
|---|---|---|---|---|---|---|---|---|---|
| 1 | Club Unión Central | 6 | 5 | 1 | 0 | 15 | 4 | +11 | 16 |
| 2 | Club Atlético Ciclón | 6 | 4 | 2 | 0 | 14 | 10 | +4 | 14 |
| 3 | Real Charcas | 6 | 3 | 1 | 2 | 11 | 12 | −1 | 10 |
| 4 | Deportivo Garcia | 6 | 3 | 0 | 3 | 12 | 13 | −1 | 9 |
| 5 | Union Tarija | 7 | 2 | 0 | 5 | 9 | 13 | −4 | 6 |
| 6 | Bamin Tarija | 6 | 1 | 1 | 4 | 6 | 12 | −6 | 4 |

=== Pando ===
- Estadio Gran Cobija would host the matches.

| Pos | Team | Pld | W | D | L | GF | GA | GD | Pts |
|---|---|---|---|---|---|---|---|---|---|
| 1 | Vaca Dies | 6 | 5 | 1 | 0 | 23 | 14 | +9 | 16 |
| 2 | Universitario de Pando | 9 | 4 | 2 | 3 | 14 | 10 | +4 | 14 |
| 3 | Miraflores | 6 | 3 | 2 | 1 | 18 | 17 | +1 | 11 |
| 4 | Real Santa Cruz | 6 | 3 | 0 | 3 | 18 | 18 | 0 | 9 |
| 5 | Perequije | 6 | 2 | 1 | 3 | 11 | 18 | −7 | 7 |
| 6 | 1 de Mayo | 6 | 1 | 2 | 3 | 8 | 15 | −7 | 5 |

=== Oruro ===
- Estadio Jesús Bermúdez would host the matches.

| Pos | Team | Pld | W | D | L | GF | GA | GD | Pts |
|---|---|---|---|---|---|---|---|---|---|
| 1 | Huachacalla | 7 | 6 | 1 | 0 | 23 | 13 | +10 | 19 |
| 2 | Sebaya | 7 | 5 | 0 | 2 | 12 | 5 | +7 | 15 |
| 3 | Oruro Royal | 7 | 4 | 0 | 3 | 14 | 10 | +4 | 12 |
| 4 | Club Bolivar Nimbles | 7 | 3 | 1 | 3 | 10 | 14 | −4 | 10 |
| 5 | Deportivo Cristal | 7 | 3 | 1 | 3 | 9 | 15 | −6 | 10 |
| 6 | Rosario Central de Oruro | 7 | 3 | 0 | 4 | 8 | 14 | −6 | 9 |
| 7 | Club Villaroel | 7 | 2 | 1 | 4 | 7 | 15 | −8 | 7 |
| 8 | Deportivo Kala | 7 | 1 | 1 | 5 | 5 | 13 | −8 | 4 |

=== Chuquisaca ===
- Estadio Olímpico Patria would host the matches.

| Pos | Team | Pld | W | D | L | GF | GA | GD | Pts |
|---|---|---|---|---|---|---|---|---|---|
| 1 | Club Independiente Petrolero | 7 | 6 | 1 | 0 | 20 | 8 | +12 | 19 |
| 2 | Club Universitario | 7 | 5 | 2 | 0 | 17 | 8 | +9 | 17 |
| 3 | Club Fancesa | 7 | 5 | 0 | 2 | 16 | 15 | +1 | 15 |
| 4 | Stomers | 7 | 4 | 1 | 2 | 14 | 13 | +1 | 13 |
| 5 | Madrid | 7 | 3 | 1 | 3 | 10 | 13 | −3 | 10 |
| 6 | Club Atletico Figaro | 7 | 2 | 2 | 3 | 8 | 14 | −6 | 8 |
| 7 | Club Junin | 7 | 2 | 0 | 5 | 6 | 12 | −6 | 6 |
| 8 | Deportivo Alcala | 7 | 1 | 1 | 5 | 5 | 18 | −13 | 4 |

=== Potosi ===
- Estadio Victor Agustín Ugarte would host the matches.

| Pos | Team | Pld | W | D | L | GF | GA | GD | Pts |
|---|---|---|---|---|---|---|---|---|---|
| 1 | Nacional Potosí | 7 | 7 | 0 | 0 | 23 | 9 | +14 | 21 |
| 2 | Club Real Potosí | 7 | 6 | 1 | 0 | 19 | 10 | +9 | 19 |
| 3 | Universitario de Potosi | 7 | 5 | 1 | 1 | 16 | 10 | +6 | 16 |
| 4 | Club Stormers San Lorenzo | 7 | 5 | 1 | 1 | 18 | 18 | 0 | 16 |
| 5 | Potosi F.C. | 7 | 3 | 1 | 3 | 12 | 20 | −8 | 10 |
| 6 | Deportivo Juva | 7 | 2 | 0 | 5 | 8 | 18 | −10 | 6 |
| 7 | Municipal | 7 | 1 | 1 | 5 | 5 | 20 | −15 | 4 |
| 8 | Juventud Valencia | 7 | 0 | 0 | 7 | 3 | 23 | −20 | 0 |

=== Beni ===
- Estadio Gran Mamoré would host the matches.

| Pos | Team | Pld | W | D | L | GF | GA | GD | Pts |
|---|---|---|---|---|---|---|---|---|---|
| 1 | Municipal Real Mamoré | 7 | 6 | 0 | 1 | 13 | 1 | +12 | 18 |
| 2 | Primero de Mayo | 7 | 4 | 3 | 0 | 14 | 6 | +8 | 15 |
| 3 | Universitario De Beni | 7 | 4 | 3 | 0 | 12 | 7 | +5 | 15 |
| 4 | Mamore F.C | 7 | 4 | 0 | 3 | 11 | 11 | 0 | 12 |
| 5 | Rio Mamore | 7 | 2 | 2 | 3 | 8 | 15 | −7 | 8 |
| 6 | Deportivo Beni | 7 | 1 | 2 | 4 | 5 | 14 | −9 | 5 |
| 7 | Juan Rios | 7 | 1 | 0 | 6 | 3 | 12 | −9 | 3 |
| 8 | Club Trinidad | 7 | 0 | 0 | 7 | 2 | 18 | −16 | 0 |

=== Qualifying round ===
| Team 1 | Agg. | Team 2 | 1st leg | 2nd leg |
|---|---|---|---|---|
| The Strongest | 0–1 | Club Blooming | 0–0 | 0–1 |
| Universitario (CBBA) | 2–3 | Club Atlético Ciclón | 2–1 | 0–2 |
| Universitario de Pando | 4–2 | Sebaya | 2–0 | 2–2 |
| Club Universitario | 0–3 | Club Real Potosí | 0–3 | 0–0 |
| Primero de Mayo | 0–2 | La Paz F.C | 0–1 | 0–1 |
| Guabirá | 1–0 | Club Aurora | 0–0 | 1–0 |
| Oruro Royal | 4–1 | Club Fancesa | 3–0 | 1–1 |
| Universitario de Potosi | 0–2 | Universitario De Beni | 0–1 | 0–1 |

=== Play-off round ===
| Team 1 | Agg. | Team 2 | 1st leg | 2nd leg |
|---|---|---|---|---|
| Club Blooming | 0–3 | Club Atlético Ciclón | 0–0 | 0–3 |
| Universitario de Pando | 0–1 | Club Real Potosí | 0–0 | 0–1 |
| La Paz F.C | 2–3 | Guabirá | 2–0 | 0–3 |
| Oruro Royal | 2–1 | Universitario De Beni | 0–0 | 2–1 |

=== Group stage ===
- Note that Oruro Royal withdrawal from the group as their plane crashed in Los Andes, but they'll play in Loser's Round.

Group A

Standings

| Pos | Team | Pld | W | D | L | GF | GA | GD | Pts |
|---|---|---|---|---|---|---|---|---|---|
| 1 | Oriente Petrolero (A) | 10 | 6 | 2 | 2 | 25 | 13 | +12 | 20 |
| 2 | Bolívar (A) | 10 | 5 | 2 | 3 | 19 | 13 | +6 | 17 |
| 3 | Jorge Wilstermann (A) | 10 | 5 | 2 | 3 | 14 | 12 | +2 | 17 |
| 4 | Real Potosí (A) | 10 | 3 | 2 | 5 | 12 | 18 | −6 | 11 |
| 5 | Atlético Ciclón | 10 | 2 | 4 | 4 | 19 | 21 | −2 | 10 |
| 6 | Unión Central | 10 | 2 | 2 | 6 | 11 | 23 | −12 | 8 |

Updated to match(es) played on February 12, 2010. Source: RSSSF
Rules for classification: 1) points; 2) goal difference; 3) number of goals scored.
(A) Advance to a further round

Results

| Home \ Away | BOL | RPO | OPE | UCE | ACI | WIL |
|---|---|---|---|---|---|---|
| Bolívar | | 2–0 | 1–2 | 6–1 | 4–1 | 1–0 |
| Real Potosí | 1–3 | | 0–1 | 3–1 | 2–2 | 1–0 |
| Oriente Petrolero | 4–0 | 3–0 | | 4–1 | 3–3 | 3–4 |
| Unión Central | 0–0 | 2–3 | 1–2 | | 1–0 | 0–0 |
| Atlético Ciclón | 3–1 | 2–2 | 2–2 | 2–3 | | 3–0 |
| Jorge Wilstermann | 1–1 | 2–0 | 1–0 | 3–2 | 3–1 | |

Updated to match(es) played on February 12, 2010. Source: RSSSF
Legend: Blue = home team win; Yellow = draw; Red = away team win.

Group B

Standings

| Pos | Team | Pld | W | D | L | GF | GA | GD | Pts |
|---|---|---|---|---|---|---|---|---|---|
| 1 | Guabirá (A) | 10 | 6 | 4 | 0 | 22 | 12 | +10 | 22 |
| 2 | Real Mamoré (A) | 10 | 5 | 1 | 4 | 20 | 15 | +5 | 16 |
| 3 | Nacional Potosí (A) | 10 | 5 | 1 | 4 | 20 | 16 | +4 | 16 |
| 4 | Independiente Petrolero (A) | 10 | 4 | 2 | 4 | 15 | 17 | −2 | 14 |
| 5 | Huachacalla | 10 | 2 | 3 | 5 | 15 | 15 | 0 | 9 |
| 6 | Vaca Diez | 10 | 1 | 1 | 8 | 7 | 24 | −17 | 4 |

Updated to match(es) played on February 12, 2010. Source: RSSSF
Rules for classification: 1) points; 2) goal difference; 3) number of goals scored.
(A) Advance to a further round

Results

| Home \ Away | GUA | RMA | NAC | IPE | HUA | VAC |
|---|---|---|---|---|---|---|
| Guabirá | | 2–0 | 1–0 | 3–2 | 0–0 | 4–0 |
| Real Mamoré | 2–3 | | 1–0 | 5–1 | 2–0 | 3–0 |
| Nacional Potosí | 4–4 | 3–2 | | 2–1 | 2–1 | 3–1 |
| Independiente Petrolero | 0–0 | 2–3 | 1–0 | | 1–0 | 2–0 |
| Huachacalla | 3–3 | 2–2 | 3–2 | 2–3 | | 3–0 |
| Vaca Diez | 1–3 | 2–0 | 1–4 | 2–2 | 0–1 | |

Updated to match(es) played on February 12, 2010. Source: RSSSF
Legend: Blue = home team win; Yellow = draw; Red = away team win.

=== Loser's round ===
| Team 1 | Agg. | Team 2 | 1st leg | 2nd leg |
|---|---|---|---|---|
| Mariscal del Alto | 3–4 | Real Santa Cruz | 2–3 | 1–1 |
| Club Enrique Happ | 2–0 | Real Charcas | 0–0 | 2–0 |
| Miraflores | 1–3 | Club Bolivar Nimbles | 1–0 | 0–3 |
| Stomers | 2–4 | Club Stormers San Lorenzo | 2–2 | 0–2 |
| Mamore F.C | 0–5 | Oruro Royal | 0–0 | 0–5 |

== The last 14th ==
- Mariscal del Alto Qualified as the best loser.
- The rules of the loser's round is that the 2 teams team that score more goal than the other they

'll qualify for the las 6th.

Loser's round

| Team 1 | Agg. | Team 2 | 1st leg | 2nd leg |
|---|---|---|---|---|
| Real Santa Cruz | 4–0 | Club Enrique Happ | 4–0 | 0–0 |
| Club Bolivar Nimbles | 3–1 | Club Stormers San Lorenzo | 0–0 | 3–1 |
| Oruro Royal | 2–1 | Mariscal del Alto | 1–1 | 1–0 |

The last 8th

| Team 1 | Agg. | Team 2 | 1st leg | 2nd leg |
|---|---|---|---|---|
| Oriente Petrolero | 3–2 | Guabira | 2–0 | 1–2 |
| Bolivar | 5–3 | Real Mamoré | 2–0 | 3–3 |
| Jorge Wilstermann | 0–1 | Nacional Potosi | 0–0 | 0–1 |
| Real Potosí | 2–0 | Independiente Petrolero | 0–0 | 2–0 |

=== Quarter-finals ===
| Team 1 | Agg. | Team 2 | 1st leg | 2nd leg |
|---|---|---|---|---|
| Oriente Petrolero | 1–2 | Real Potosí | 1–1 | 0–1 |
| Bolivar | 4–1 | Club Bolivar Nimbles | 2–0 | 2–1 |
| Real Santa Cruz | 3–1 | Nacional Potosi | 2–0 | 1–1 |

September 23
20:00

| Oriente Petrolero | 1 – 1 | Real Potosí |
|---|---|---|
| José Alfredo Castillo 56' | | Alvaro Ricaldi 65' |

Estadio Ramón Tahuichi Aguilera, Santa Cruz
Attendance: 40,000

September 24
15:30

| Bolívar | 2 – 0 | Club Bolivar Nimbles |
|---|---|---|
| Horacio Chiorazzo 23'; Vladimir Soria 76' |

Estadio Hernando Siles, La Paz
Attendance: 43,000

September 25
20:00

| Real Santa Cruz | 2–0 | Nacional Potosi |
|---|---|---|
| Edu Monteiro 11'; Eduardo Zapata] 89' |

Estadio Ramón Tahuichi Aguilera, Santa Cruz
Attendance: 23,000

October 15
20:00

| Real Potosí | 1–0 | Oriente Petrolero |
|---|---|---|
| Juan Carlos Mamani 11' |

Estadio Victor Agustín Ugarte, Potosí
Attendance: 30,000

October 17
20:00

| Club Bolivar Nimbles | 1–2 | Bolivar |
|---|---|---|
| Jorge Quiroga 20' | | Ronald García 45'; Miguel Mercado 90' |

Estadio Jesús Bermúdez, Oruro
Attendance: 27,000

October 15
20:00

| Nacional Potosi | 1–1 | Real Santa Cruz |
|---|---|---|
| Jesús Heredia 12' | | Edu Monteiro 15' |

Estadio Victor Agustín Ugarte, Potosí
Attendance: 24,000

=== Semi-finals ===
| Team 1 | Agg. | Team 2 | 1st leg | 2nd leg |
|---|---|---|---|---|
| Oriente Petrolero | 1–1(a) | Real Santa Cruz | 1–1 | 0–0 |
| Bolivar | 2–1 | Real Potosí | 1–0 | 1–1 |

November 3
20:00

| Oriente Petrolero | 1 – 1 | Real Santa Cruz |
|---|---|---|
| José Alfredo Castillo 76' | | Edu Monteiro 45' |

Estadio Ramón Tahuichi Aguilera, Santa Cruz
Attendance: 42,000

November 4
15:30

| Bolívar | 1 – 0 | Real Potosí |
|---|---|---|
| Marco Sandy 87' |

Estadio Hernando Siles, La Paz
Attendance: 44,000

November 13
21:00

| Real Santa Cruz | 0 – 0 | Oriente Petrolero |

Estadio Ramón Tahuichi Aguilera, Santa Cruz
Attendance: 39,000

November 15
20:00

| Real Potosí | 1–1 | Bolívar |
|---|---|---|
| Goal | | Joaquín Botero 56' |

Estadio Victor Agustín Ugarte, Potosí
Attendance: 32,000

== Final ==
- For the first time the final will be play in an exterior country and that's in Ecuador the decision was made by Bolivian Football Federation.

| Team 1 | Score | Team 2 |
|---|---|---|
| Bolivar | 3–2 | Real Santa Cruz |

November 29
20:00

| Bolívar | 3–2 | Real Santa Cruz |
|---|---|---|
| Joaquín Botero 23'; Danner Pachi 84'; Iván Castillo 90' | | Edu Monteiro 54'; Juan Pablo de Souza 76' |

Estadio Hernando Siles, La Paz
Attendance: 30,000
