= 2002 Copa Bolivia =

Tournament details
- Country: Bolivia

Final positions
- Champions: Oriente Petrolero (10th title)
- Runners-up: Club Jorge Wilstermann

The 2002 Copa Bolivia was the last Copa Bolivia. Only teams from 2nd division played in the qualifying round. The tournament was replaced in the following year with the Copa Aerosur.

== Qualifying round ==
Team 1	Agg.	Team 2	1st leg	2nd leg
Club Callejas	1–3	Fraternidad Tigres	1–0	0–3
Club Destroyers	2–0	Club 31 De Octubre	0–0	2–0
Deportivo Cristal	4–6	Club Atlético Ciclón	4–2	0–4
Oruro Royal'	3–0	Real Charcas Petrolero	1–1	2–0
Club Fancesa	1–5	Club Independiente Petrolero	0–2	1–3
Universitario De Beni	3–0	Universitario de Pando	2–0	1–0
Primero de Mayo	2–0	Vaca Diez	2–0	0–0
Club Stormers San Lorenzo	5–3	Universitario De Chochabamba	3–1	2–2
Nacional Potosí	6–1	Club Enrique Happ	3–1	3–0

== Play-off Round ==
- Oruro Royal Withdrawn from the tournament because they were going to celebrate what happened the last year after the plane crashed.

Team 1	Agg.	Team 2	1st leg	2nd leg
Fraternidad Tigres	3–5	Club Atlético Ciclón	2–2	1–3
Club Destroyers	1–2	Guabirá	1–0	0–2
Club Independiente Petrolero	5–3	Primero de Mayo	3–1	2–2
Bolívar	2–0	Universitario De Beni	1–0	1–
Oriente Petrolero	7–3	Unión Central	3–0	4–3
Blooming	4–3	Real Potosí	2–0	2–3
Jorge Wilstermann	1–0	Nacional Potosí	1–0	0–0
Iberoamericana	2–3	Municipal Real Mamoré	1–0	1–3
San José	0–3	The Strongest	0–0	0–3
Club Stormers San Lorenzo	3–2	Mariscal Braun	3–0	0–2

== Group stage ==
Group A

Standings

Pos	Team	Pld	W	D	L	GF	GA	GD	Pts
1	Oriente Petrolero (A)	8	5	3	0	20	9	+11	18
2	Guabirá (A)	8	5	1	2	17	14	+3	16
3	Blooming	8	3	2	3	19	19	0	11
4	Independiente Petrolero	8	2	2	4	8	7	+1	8
5	Atlético Ciclón	8	1	0	7	10	13	−3	3

Updated to match(es) played on February 12, 2010. Source: RSSSF
Rules for classification: 1) points; 2) goal difference; 3) number of goals scored.
(A) Advance to a further round

Results

Home \ Away	OPE	GUA	BLO	IPE	ACI
Oriente Petrolero		3–0	4–0	3–1	1–0
Guabirá	2–2		1–0	6–2	2–1
Blooming	3–3	2–3		3–1	4–1
Independiente Petrolero	0–0	2–0	3–3		1–0
Atlético Ciclón	3–4	2–3	3–4	2–0	

Updated to match(es) played on February 12, 2010. Source: RSSSF
Legend: Blue = home team win; Yellow = draw; Red = away team win.

Group B

Standings

Pos	Team	Pld	W	D	L	GF	GA	GD	Pts
1	Bolívar (A)	8	5	3	0	18	9	+9	18
2	Jorge Wilstermann (A)	8	3	4	1	18	14	+4	13
3	The Strongest	8	3	1	4	17	20	−3	10
4	Real Mamoré	8	2	2	4	9	11	−2	8
5	Mariscal Braun	8	1	2	5	13	19	−6	5

Updated to match(es) played on February 12, 2010. Source: RSSSF
Rules for classification: 1) points; 2) goal difference; 3) number of goals scored.
(A) Advance to a further round

Results

Home \ Away	BOL	WIL	STR	RMA	MBR
Bolívar		0–0	2–0	2–1	4–0
Jorge Wilstermann	2–2		5–3	1–0	3–1
The Strongest	3–4	3–3		2–1	3–0
Real Mamoré	0–0	2–1	2–3		1–0
Mariscal Braun	3–4	3–3	3–0	2–2	

Updated to match(es) played on February 12, 2010. Source: RSSSF
Legend: Blue = home team win; Yellow = draw; Red = away team win.

== Semi-final ==
Team 1	Agg.	Team 2	1st leg	2nd leg
Oriente Petrolero	4–3	Club Bolivar	2–1	2–2
Guabirá	2–3	Club Jorge Wilstermann	1–1	1–2

July 10
15:30

Bolívar	1 – 2	Oriente Petrolero
Joaquín Botero 13'		Ronald Raldes 61'; Gerardo Reinoso 89'

Estadio Hernando Siles, La Paz
Attendance: 43,000

July 10
15:30

Club Jorge Wilstermann	1 – 1	Guabirá
Luis Darío Calvo 33'		Martín Lígori 61'

Felix Capriles, Cochabamba
Attendance: 29,000

August 18
20:30

Oriente Petrolero	2 – 2	Bolívar
José Alfredo Castillo 75', 88'		Óscar Carmelo Sánchez 43'; Joaquín Botero 76'

Estadio Ramón Tahuichi Aguilera, Santa Cruz
Attendance: 40,000

August 19
20:30

Guabirá	1 – 2	Club Jorge Wilstermann
Santos Amador 13'		Demetrio Angola 50'; Luis Darío Calvo 60'

Estadio Gilberto Parada, Montero
Attendance: 17,000

== Final ==
Team 1	Score	Team 2
Oriente Petrolero	2–0	Club Jorge Wilstermann

August 20
20:30

Oriente Petrolero	2 – 0	Club Jorge Wilstermann
Cristino Jara 54'; Raúl Justiniano 76'

Estadio Hernando Siles, La Paz
Attendance: 45,000
