= 2022 Copa Bolivia =

Tournament details
- Country: Bolivia
- Dates: 21 April – 18 July 2022
- Teams: 71 (Preliminary stage); 32 (National stage)

Final positions
- Champions: None, cancelled

The 2022 Copa Bolivia was slated to be the first edition of the Copa Bolivia, Bolivia's domestic football cup competition organized by the Bolivian Football Federation (FBF). Ninety-four teams from the División Profesional and regional leagues were slated to take part in the competition, which started on 21 April with its regional preliminary stages and was scheduled to end on 3 November 2022.

The champions were entitled to qualify for the 2023 Copa Sudamericana, taking the Bolivia 2 berth for that competition, as well as the 2022 Supercopa Bolivia and would also earn a prize of US$ 500,000.

The competition was cancelled by the FBF on 18 July 2022, prior to the start of the national stage, after 28 out of the 32 teams that qualified failed to fully comply with the established requirements.

== Format ==
The competition consisted of a preliminary stage and a national stage. In the preliminary stage, which was contested on a regional basis, the teams from each regional association took part in a knockout tournament which qualified one team from each regional league to the national stage, where they would join the 16 División Profesional teams (including the two promoted teams for the 2022 season), along with the other six quarter-finalists of the 2021 Copa Simón Bolívar, and the losing team of the 2021 promotion/relegation play-off (Real Potosí) to make a field of 32 teams.

For the national stage, which was not played, the 16 Primera División clubs would be drawn against a rival from the División Aficionados (Copa Simón Bolívar or regional league) into 16 double-legged ties in which the lower-tier team would host the first leg, with the 16 winners advancing to the round of 16. The subsequent rounds (round of 16, quarter-finals, and semi-finals) would also be played as double-legged ties, while the final would be played as a single game on neutral ground.

== Teams ==
División Profesional clubs
| Always Ready | Atlético Palmaflor | Aurora | Blooming |
| Bolívar | Guabirá | Independiente Petrolero | Jorge Wilstermann |
| Nacional Potosí | Oriente Petrolero | Real Santa Cruz | Real Tomayapo |
| Royal Pari | The Strongest | Universitario de Sucre | Universitario de Vinto |
Copa Simón Bolívar clubs
| Ciudad Nueva Santa Cruz | Empresa Minera Huanuni | García Agreda | Real Potosí |
| San Antonio Bulo Bulo | Torre Fuerte | Vaca Díez | |
Regional leagues clubs
| (Beni Department) 3 de Febrero | (Beni Department) Libertad Gran Mamoré | | |
| (Chuquisaca Department) Atlético Sucre | (Chuquisaca Department) Deportivo Alemán | (Chuquisaca Department) Fancesa | (Chuquisaca Department) Flamengo |
| (Chuquisaca Department) ~~Mojocoya~~ (Note: Mojocoya and Morro Municipal both withdrew from the competition to prioritize their participation in the Copa Simón Bolívar.) | (Chuquisaca Department) ~~Morro Municipal~~ | (Chuquisaca Department) Stormers | (Chuquisaca Department) Tomina |
| (Cochabamba Department) Arauco Prado | (Cochabamba Department) Ayacucho | (Cochabamba Department) Cala Cala | (Cochabamba Department) Chacacollo |
| (Cochabamba Department) Cochabamba | (Cochabamba Department) Enrique Happ | (Cochabamba Department) Estudiantes Quillacollo | (Cochabamba Department) Independiente |
| (Cochabamba Department) Municipal Colcapirhua | (Cochabamba Department) Municipal Tiquipaya | (Cochabamba Department) Nueva Cliza | (Cochabamba Department) Pasión Celeste |
| (Cochabamba Department) Real Cochabamba | (Cochabamba Department) Universitario de Cochabamba | (Cochabamba Department) Universitario San Simón | (La Paz) 31 de Octubre |
| (La Paz) ABB | (La Paz) Chaco Petrolero | (La Paz) Deportivo FATIC | (La Paz) Deportivo ICC |
| (La Paz) Hiska Nacional | (La Paz) Litoral | (La Paz) LDV Copacabana | (La Paz) Real Palcoma |
| (La Paz) Unión Maestranza | Universitario de La Paz | (La Paz) Vírgen de Chijipata | (La Paz) White Star |
| (Oruro Department) AFIZ | (Oruro Department) CDT Real Oruro | (Oruro Department) Deportivo Escara | (Oruro Department) Deportivo Shalon |
| (Oruro Department) GV San José | (Oruro Department) Oruro Royal | (Oruro Department) ~~San Isidro~~ (Note: San Isidro withdrew from the competition due to financial reasons.) | (Oruro Department) SUR-CAR |
| (Pando Department) Chaco | (Pando Department) Guerreros de Dios | (Pando Department) Libertad | (Pando Department) Mariscal Sucre |
| (Pando Department) Moto Club | (Pando Department) RVD San Lorenzo | (Pando Department) Real Mapajo | (Pando Department) Universitario de Pando |
| (Potosí Department) Deportivo Cervecería | (Potosí Department) Deportivo JUVA | (Potosí Department) Ferrocarril Palmeiras | (Potosí Department) Wilstermann Cooperativas |
| (Santa Cruz Department) 24 de Septiembre | (Santa Cruz Department) Argentinos Juniors | (Santa Cruz Department) Calleja | (Santa Cruz Department) Deportivo Cooper |
| (Santa Cruz Department) Destroyer's | (Santa Cruz Department) El Torno | (Santa Cruz Department) Oriente Petrolero B | (Santa Cruz Department) Universidad |
| (Tarija Department) Atlético Bermejo | (Tarija Department) Avilés Industrial | (Tarija Department) Estudiantes de Chiquiacá | (Tarija Department) Gobierno Municipal |
| (Tarija Department) Municipal Tarija | (Tarija Department) Municipalidad de Yacuíba | (Tarija Department) Olimpia Petrolero | (Tarija Department) Unión Tarija |

== Preliminary stage ==
Teams from the Bolivian Football Regional Leagues took part in various department-based preliminary rounds to win one of the 9 places in the national stage (round of 32). The first matches of the preliminary rounds began in April 2022, with the final matches of the preliminary rounds being played on 14 July 2022.

| Department | Dates | Preliminary stage winner |
|---|---|---|
| (Beni Department) Beni | 12–14 July 2022 | 3 de Febrero |
| (Chuquisaca Department) Chuquisaca | 19 June – 2 July 2022 | Atlético Sucre |
| (Cochabamba Department) Cochabamba | 14 May – 14 July 2022 | Enrique Happ |
| La Paz | 18 May – 14 July 2022 | Deportivo FATIC |
| (Oruro Department) Oruro | 9–26 June 2022 | SUR-CAR |
| (Pando Department) Pando | 11–19 June 2022 | RVD San Lorenzo |
| (Potosí Department) Potosí | 19–26 June 2022 | Wilstermann Cooperativas |
| (Santa Cruz Department) Santa Cruz | 21 April – 22 June 2022 | 24 de Septiembre |
| (Tarija Department) Tarija | 2–13 July 2022 | Olimpia Petrolero |

== See also ==
- 2022 Bolivian Primera División season
