= 2004 Copa Aerosur =

Copa Aerosur
- Season: 2004
- 2004 Copa Aerosur: Wilstermann (1st title)

Following are the results of the 2004 Copa Aerosur, the Bolivian football tournament held in La Paz, Cochabamba and Santa Cruz, sponsored by AeroSur airline.

The 2004 tournament started in January and ended in February. The 12 teams from the top division qualified for the first stage.

== First round ==
Team 1	Agg.	Team 2	1st leg	2nd leg
Litoral	4–2	Universitario (B)	2–0	2–2
Real Mamoré	1–3	Nacional Potosí	1–1	0–2
White Star	1–0	Warnes	0–0	1–0
Bolivar Nimbles	3–5	'Callejas	2–3	1–2

== Second round ==
Team 1	Agg.	Team 2	1st leg	2nd leg
White Star	2–3	Real America	1–1	1–2
Callejas	5–1	Litoral	3–0	2–1
Nacional Potosí	3–0	Fraternidad Tigres	0–0	3–0
Torno	0–1	Ciclón	0–0	0–1
Flamengo	3–0	Universitario (P)	3–0	0–0
Universitario (C)	2–1	ABB	1–0	1–1
Enrique Happ	3–2	Stormers San Lorenzo	1–2	2–0
Oruro Royal	5–4	Independiente Petrolero	3–3	2–1
31 de Octubre	1–0	Cristal	1–0	0–0
Fancesa	4–6	Vaca Diez	3–2	2–5

== Third round ==
Team 1	Agg.	Team 2	1st leg	2nd leg
Real America	0–3	Oriente Petrolero	0–1	0–2
San José	5–4	Callejas	3–2	2–2
Flamengo	1–0	Vaca Diez	1–0	0–0
Blooming	1–1(4–5 p)	The Strongest	1–0	0–1
Nacional Potosí	0–1	Ciclón	0–0	0–1
Unión Central	3–0	Universitario (C)	3–0	0–0
Aurora	2–0	Iberoamericana	2–0	0–0
Guabirá	4–2	Bolívar	2–1	2–1
La Paz	1–3	Jorge Wilstermann	0–1	1–2
Oruro Royal	2–1	31 de Octubre	1–0	0–2
Real Potosí	5–0	Enrique Happ	2–0	3–0

== Bracket ==
- Note that 5 best loser qualified for this round.

First knockout round
1	Oriente Petrolero	3	4	7
16	San José	1	2	3
8	Flamengo	1	2	3
9	Unión Central	1	3	4
5	Ciclón	1	0	1
12	Aurora	1	3	4
4	Guabirá	1	1	2
13	Nacional Potosí	1	0	1
6	Oruro Royal	4	0	4
11	Real Potosí(a)	2	2	6
3	31 de Octubre	1	0	1
14	The Strongest	3	2	5
7	Vaca Diez(p)	3	0	3(7)
10	Callejas	0	3	3(6)
2	Blooming	1	2	3
15	Jorge Wilstermann	4	2	6

Quarter-finals
Oriente Petrolero	4	1	5
Unión Central	0	1	1
Aurora	0	4	4
Guabirá	2	0	2
Real Potosí	2	1	3
The Strongest	2	2	4
Vaca Diez	0	0	0
Jorge Wilstermann	1	0	1

Semi-finals
Oriente Petrolero	2	0	2
Aurora(a)	1	1	2
The Strongest	1	2	3
Jorge Wilstermann	1	3	4

Final
Aurora	0
Jorge Wilstermann	1

== Semi-final ==
Team 1	Agg.	Team 2	1st leg	2nd leg
Oriente Petrolero	2–2(a)	Aurora	2–1	0–1
The Strongest	3–4	Jorge Wilstermann	0–4	3–0

== Final ==
8 February
19:00

Aurora	0 – 1	Jorge Wilstermann
		Thiago Leitao 5'

Estadio Felix Capriles, Cochabamba, Bolivia
Attendance: 2,000
