= 2009 Copa Simón Bolívar (Bolivia) =

Copa Simón Bolívar
- Season: 2009
- Champions: Guabirá (3rd Title)
- Promoted: Guabirá; Ciclón (Relegation/promotion playoff)
- Matches: 30

The 2nd tier in the Bolivian Football pyramid consists of 9 regional leagues (one for each department), the number of participants varies depending on the department, It usually has between 8 and 12 teams. Both winner and runner-up of each league compete in the Copa Simón Bolívar, with the winner of such tournament gaining promotion to the 1st Division, and the runner-up playing a play-off match with the 11th placed team in the 1st Division. Until 1976 all 8 regional championships (Pando didn't have an organized tournament at the time) were the top in the national football pyramid, with the winner of the Copa Simón Bolívar being crowned as national champion.

The oldest regional championship is the one played in La Paz, it started in 1914 and it was considered for many years as the top Bolivian league, even more when it turned into a semi-pro tournament in 1950 and started including teams from Oruro and Cochabamba.

6 teams with the best average qualify for Aerosur Cup 2010 Qualifying Round.

== Changes from last season ==
=== From Bolivian Football League 2008 ===
Promoted to Liga de Fútbol Profesional Boliviano 2009

- Nacional Potosí

Relegated to Regional League

- Guabirá

== Champions and Runner-up from Primera A (Regional League) ==
champion	runner-up	Second Division Regional League
Guabirá	Club Destroyers	Santa Cruz Association Championship
Fraternidad Tigres	Club 31 De Octubre	La Paz Football Association Championship
Deportivo Cristal	Oruro Royal	Oruro Football Association Championship
Club Atlético Ciclón	Real Charcas Petrolero	Tarija Football Association Championship
Club Fancesa	Club Independiente Petrolero	Chuquisaca Football Association Championship
Universitario De Beni	Primero De Mayo	Beni Football Association Championship
Vaca Diez	Universitario de Pando	Pando Football Association Championship
Club Stormers San Lorenzo	Universitario	Potosi Football Association Championship
Enrique Happ	Universitario de Cochabamba	Cochabamba Football Association Championship

== Group phase ==
=== Group A1 ===
Team	Pts	Pld	W	D	L	GF	GA	GD
Fraternidad Tigres	12	6	4	0	2	14	9	+5
Enrique Happ	12	6	3	1	2	13	10	+3
Deportivo Cristal	3	6	1	0	5	8	16	-8

=== Group A2 ===
Team	Pts	Pld	W	D	L	GF	GA	GD
Oruro Royal	10	6	3	1	2	16	10	+6
Universitario (Cochabamba)	10	6	3	1	2	12	12	0
31 de Octubre	5	6	1	2	3	3	9	-6

=== Group B1 ===
Team	Pts	Pld	W	D	L	GF	GA	GD
Ciclón	15	6	5	0	1	15	2	+13
Club Independiente Petrolero	12	6	4	0	2	13	8	+5
Universitario (Potosí)	3	6	1	0	5	5	23	-18

=== Group B2 ===
Team	Pts	Pld	W	D	L	GF	GA	GD
Stormers San Lorenzo	12	6	4	0	2	16	10	+6
Real Charcas Petrolero	7	6	2	1	3	6	8	-2
Fancesa	4	6	1	1	4	3	7	-4

=== Group C ===
Team	Pts	Pld	W	D	L	GF	GA	GD
Guabirá	16	6	5	1	0	13	5	+8
Club Destroyers	12	6	4	0	6	15	6	+9
Universitario (Beni)	10	6	3	1	2	15	8	+7
Universitario (Pando)	6	6	2	0	4	7	12	-5
Primero de Mayo	5	6	1	2	3	11	12	-1
Vaca Díez	3	6	1	0	5	5	23	-18

=== Quarterfinals ===
The ties are played in two legs, with the first leg taking place on 31 October 2009 and the second leg being played on 7 November 2009. Each club will play one leg at home. The winners on aggregate will advance to the semifinals. In case of both teams being tied on aggregate after both matches a penalty shootout will be conducted.

Team #1	Points earned	Team #2	1st leg	2nd leg
Oruro Royal	3–3 (1–4 p)	Guabirá	4–1	1–5
Destroyers	3–3 (4–5 p)	Ciclón	2–0	1–3
Stormers San Lorenzo	3–3 (3–4 p)	Fraternidad Tigres	3–0	0–1

=== First leg ===
October 31
15:00

Oruro Royal	4 – 1	Guabirá
Sergio Ure 20'; Luis Ramoza 53', 61'; Danenso 64'		Fredy Chispas 87'

Estadio Jesús Bermúdez, Oruro
Attendance: 4,000

November 7
15:00

Destroyers	2 – 0	Ciclón
Juninho Laercio 12'; Edu Monteiro 63'

Estadio Ramón Tahuichi Aguilera, Santa Cruz de la Sierra
Attendance: 4,000
Referee: Jose Jordan

November 7
15:00

Stormers San Lorenzo	3 – 0	Fraternidad Tigres
Alain Saavedra 40'; Rolando 45'; Alain Saavedra 70'

Estadio Victor Agustín Ugarte, Potosí
Attendance: 7,000

=== Second leg ===
November 7
15:00

Guabirá	5 – 1	Oruro Royal
Delio Ojeda 15', 67'; Álvaro Paniagua 21', 78'; César Bordaberry 23'		Wellington Martins 29'

Estadio Gilberto Parada, Montero
Attendance: 3.000

November 7
15:00

Ciclón	4 – 2	Destroyers
Édson Zenteno 10', 15'; Vladimir 40', 63'; Gonzalo 88'		Juninho Laercio 22', 72'

Estadio IV Centenário, Tarija
Attendance: 4.500

November 7
15:30

Fraternidad Tigres	1 – 0	Stormers San Lorenzo
Jose 12'

Estadio Hernando Siles, La Paz
Attendance: 1,000

=== Semi-finals ===
- In this Round Stomers San Lorenzo qualified as the best loser

Team #1	Points earned	Team #2	1st leg	2nd leg
Fraternidad Tigres	3–3 (1–4 p)	Guabirá	2–0	0–5
Stormers San Lorenzo	0–6	Ciclón	2–3	0–5

=== First leg ===
November 14
15:30

Fraternidad Tigres	2 – 0	Guabirá

Estadio Hernando Siles, La Paz
Attendance: 500

November 14
15:30

Stormers San Lorenzo	2 – 3	Ciclón

Estadio Victor Agustín Ugarte, Potosí
Attendance: 900

=== Second leg ===
November 21
15:00

Guabirá	5 – 0	Fraternidad Tigres
Freddy Chispas 2', 41'; Álvaro Paniagua 5'; Luis Lugo 30'; Angola 71'

Estadio Gilberto Parada, Montero
Attendance: 7,500
Referee: Iván Gamboa

November 21
15:00

Ciclón	5 – 0	Stormers San Lorenzo
Vladimir Compas 20'; Gonzalo Acosta 66', 83'; Leonardo Palonvicio 79'; Felipe Lema 86'

Estadio IV Centenário, Tarija
Attendance: 15,000

== Final ==
Team #1	Points earned	Team #2	1st leg	2nd leg
Guabirá	3–3	Ciclón	2–1	2–3

=== First leg ===
November 28
15:00

Guabirá	2 – 1	Ciclón
Freddy Chispas 5'; Getulio Vaca Díez 96'		Víctor Hugo 30'

Estadio Gilberto Parada, Montero
Attendance: 11,000
Referee: Orozco

=== Second leg ===
December 5
16:00

Ciclón	3 – 2	Guabirá

Estadio IV Centenário, Tarija

2009 Copa Simon Bolivar
Champion
Guabirá
3rd title
