= 1999 Copa Bolivia =

Tournament details
- Country: Bolivia

Final positions
- Champions: Oriente Petrolero (9th title)
- Runners-up: Bolivar

The 1999 Copa Bolivia was the fourth edition of the Copa Bolivia. Jorge Wilstermann were the defending champions after beating Blooming 2–1 on aggregate in the previous season's final. The format of the tournament had change as it became knockout only.

== First round ==
Team 1	Agg.	Team 2	1st leg	2nd leg
Club Litoral	4–2	Always Ready	2–2	2–0
31 de Octubre	0–1	Municipal de Tarija	0–0	0–1
Bolivar Nimbles	1–4	Real Cochabamba	1–3	0–1
Club Real Camba	0–2	Universitario de Potosi	0–2	0–0
Club Callejas	3–2	12 De October	2–2	1–0
Club America	1–3	Pando F.C	1–2	0–1

== Second round ==
Team 1	Agg.	Team 2	1st leg	2nd leg
Club Litoral	1–0	ABB	0–0	1–0
Universitario de Potosi	2–3	Municipal de Tarija	2–0	0–3
Deportivo Cristal	2–0	Universidad de Santa Cruz	1–0	1–0
Real Cochabamba	(a)3–3	Chaco Petrolero	1–0	2–3
Universitario de Potosi	2–4	Fraternidad Tigres	0–2	2–2
Enrique Happ	2–2(a)	Club Stormers San Lorenzo	2–1	0–1
Universitario de Pando	0–1	Mariscal Santa Cruz	0–0	0–1
Club Callejas	3–2	Pando F.C	2–1	1–1

== Third round ==
- Including the four best losers from the second round.

Team 1	Agg.	Team 2	1st leg	2nd leg
Club Litoral	1–0	Blooming	0–0	1–0
Municipal de Tarija	0–5	Bolívar	0–1	0–4
Real Cochabamba	3–4	Real Potosí	2–1	1–3
Fraternidad Tigres	0–1	Club Unión Central	0–0	0–1
Independiente Petrolero	2–3	Universitario de Pando	2–1	0–2
Guabirá	(a)4–4	Real Santa Cruz	2–0	2–4
Jorge Wilstermann	2–1	San José	1–1	1–0
Club Destroyers	3–6	Oriente Petrolero	2–3	1–3
ABB	2–4	The Strongest	2–1	0–3
Universitario de Potosi	4–5	Club Callejas	4–3	0–2
Chaco Petrolero	1–2	Mariscal Santa Cruz	1–1	0–1
Enrique Happ	0–4	Club Stormers San Lorenzo	0–0	0–4

== Fourth round ==
Team 1	Agg.	Team 2	1st leg	2nd leg
Club Litoral	4–3	Club Callejas	2–3	2–1
Bolívar	6–4	Mariscal Santa Cruz	3–3	2–1
Real Potosí	1–3	Club Stormers San Lorenzo	1–0	0–3
Club Unión Central	1–5	Oriente Petrolero	1–3	0–2
Universitario de Pando	0–2	Guabirá	0–0	0–2
The Strongest	2–1	Jorge Wilstermann	1–1	1–0

== Quarter-final ==
- Including the two best losers from the fourth round.

Team 1	Agg.	Team 2	1st leg	2nd leg
Club Callejas	1–4	Bolívar	1–2	0–2
Club Stormers San Lorenzo	0–5	The Strongest	0–2	0–3
Club Litoral	5–5(a)	Guabirá	5–3	0–2
Jorge Wilstermann	2–4	Oriente Petrolero	2–4	0–0

== Semi-final ==
Team 1	Agg.	Team 2	1st leg	2nd leg
Bolívar	5–2	The Strongest	3–0	2–2
Oriente Petrolero	4–1	Guabirá	2–0	2–1

== Final ==
Team 1	Agg.	Team 2	1st leg	2nd leg
Oriente Petrolero	7–6	Bolívar	4–3	3–3
