= 2011 Bolivian Football Regional Leagues =

Primera A
- Season: 2011

This is the 102nd season of Bolivian Football Regional Leagues, also known as Primera A.

In 2010 the team that was promoted to 1st division was Nacional Potosi from Potosi, after winning the 2010 Copa Simón Bolívar. They returned to La Liga one year after being relegated in the 2009 season. It started on 6 February 2010. The draw for the qualified team for Nacional B took place on May 4.

== Santa Cruz ==
=== Primera A ===
Pos	Team	Pld	W	D	L	GF	GA	GD	Pts	Qualification
1	Real Santa Cruz	11	7	2	2	19	9	+10	23	Liguilla Final
2	Libertad de Santa Cruz	11	6	2	3	25	16	+9	20	Liguilla Final
3	Real America	11	6	2	3	17	11	+6	20	Liguilla Final
4	Universidad de Santa Cruz	11	5	4	2	25	15	+10	19	Liguilla Final
5	Destroyers	11	6	1	4	21	19	+2	19	Liguilla Final
6	Oriente Petrolero	11	5	3	3	23	14	+9	18	Liguilla Final
7	Argentino Juniors	11	5	1	5	16	16	0	16	Relegation Playoff
8	Torno F.C.	11	4	3	4	18	14	+4	15	Relegation Playoff
9	Deportivo Warnes	11	2	5	4	13	19	−6	11	Relegation Playoff
10	The Strongest Taruma	11	3	1	7	12	19	−7	10	Relegation Playoff
11	Callejas	11	3	1	7	12	24	−12	10	Relegation Playoff
12	Máquina Vieja	11	1	1	9	14	38	−24	4	Relegation Playoff

Updated to match(es) played on 5 May 2011. Source: Paraelfutbol.com
Rules for classification: 1) points; 2) goal difference; 3) number of goals scored.

=== Primera B ===
Serie A
Pos	Team	Pld	W	D	L	GF	GA	GD	Pts
1	Yapacaní F.C.	3	3	0	0	5	0	+5	9
2	Sebastián Pagador	2	2	0	0	4	0	+4	6
3	Virginia USA	2	1	0	1	2	2	0	3
4	24 de Septiembre	2	0	0	2	0	3	−3	0
5	Bancruz Piraí	3	0	0	3	0	6	−6	0

Updated to match(es) played on https://acfprensa.blogspot.com/2010/05/primera-b-strongest-taruma-cerro-la.html. Source: ACF
Rules for classification: 1) points; 2) goal difference; 3) number of goals scored.

Serie B
Pos	Team	Pld	W	D	L	GF	GA	GD	Pts
1	U.P.S.A.	3	1	2	0	9	8	+1	5
2	Florida	2	1	0	1	7	6	+1	3
3	Royal Pari	3	1	0	2	7	8	−1	3
4	25 de Junio	2	0	2	0	5	5	0	2
5	San Martín	2	0	1	1	4	5	−1	1

Updated to match(es) played on https://acfprensa.blogspot.com/2010/05/primera-b-strongest-taruma-cerro-la.html. Source: ACF
Rules for classification: 1) points; 2) goal difference; 3) number of goals scored.

== Oruro ==
=== Primera A ===
Pos	Team	Pld	W	D	L	GF	GA	GD	Pts
1	Sabaya	2	2	0	0	5	2	+3	6
2	Jóvenes Capaces de Triunfar	2	1	0	1	8	5	+3	3
3	Oruro Royal	2	1	0	1	4	2	+2	3
4	Frontanilla	2	1	0	1	6	4	+2	3
5	31 de Octubre Huanuni	1	1	0	0	2	1	+1	3
6	San José	1	1	0	0	3	2	+1	3
7	Deportivo Escara	1	0	1	0	1	1	0	1
8	Deportivo Cristal	2	0	1	1	2	5	−3	1
9	Ingenieros	1	0	0	1	1	2	−1	0
10	Atletico La Joya	2	0	0	2	2	10	−8	0

Updated to match(es) played on https://ascensobolivia.blogspot.com/. Source: Ascensobolivia.blogspot
Rules for classification: 1) points; 2) goal difference; 3) number of goals scored.

Litoral de Oruro
