= Football in Bolivia =

- Country: Bolivia
- National team: Bolivia
- First played: 1867

National competitions
- FIFA World Cup; Confederations Cup; Copa América

Club competitions
- List: League: Liga de Fútbol Profesional Boliviano; Cups: Copa Aerosur

International competitions
- FIFA Club World Cup; Copa Libertadores; Copa Sudamericana

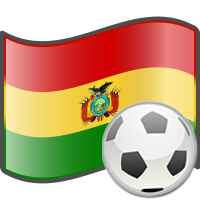
Icon for footballfrom Bolivia

Association football is the most popular sport in Bolivia, with around 70% of the people in Bolivia considered association football fans. The first modern set of rules for the sport were established in 1923, which were a major influence on the development of the modern laws of the game. Bolivia has over 2,000 football clubs.

Bolivia is home to one of the oldest football clubs (Oruro Royal) in South America. The top domestic league, the División de Fútbol Profesional, is currently considered one of the most important leagues in South America. The country also is home to the famous Tahuichi Academy which has delivered many Bolivian football stars.

It has traditionally been a male-dominated sport, but women's football has become increasingly prominent in recent years.

== History ==
Football was founded perhaps in late 19th century with the introduction of British sailors, Chileans, to the country. Nonetheless, the consequence of the War of the Pacific slowed the progress of Bolivian football, and only into 20th century, the sport became popular.

=== National teams ===
The FBF runs several national teams, including men's, women's and youth teams (Olympic, U-20, U-17).

Despite being typically one of the weaker teams in South America, Bolivia has already participated in three FIFA World Cup, at 1930, 1950 and 1994; but only scored one goal throughout three competitions. Erwin Sánchez was the sole scorer for Bolivia, as he scored in Bolivia's 1–3 defeat to Spain at 1994. In their first two participations, Bolivia was invited; and the team only qualified for 1994 edition. At the Copa América however, Bolivia has a better and prestigious record, winning one at 1963 and finished runners-up at 1997, both held at home. Bolivia also participated in one FIFA Confederations Cup at 1999 in Mexico, their fourth FIFA tournament they have played, and scored two goals.

The U-17 Bolivian team is more successful, having won one U-17 Copa América and participated in two FIFA U-17 World Cup.

== Bolivian football league system ==
=== Leagues ===
==== La Liga ====
The La Liga was founded in 1977 after Copa Simón Bolívar's top clubs broke away from the Football League in a successful effort aimed at increasing their income at the expense of clubs in the lower divisions. Links with the La Liga were maintained, and each season the bottom each two clubs are relegated the bottom club directly and the second last plays a play-off against the runner-up of the second division. La Liga is contested between 12 clubs each season (there was 16 club between 1977–1991). The current champions are Club Oriente Petrolero. Each club in La Liga in any given season owns one twentieth of a share in the league itself, meaning that they are all supposedly equal owners with equal rights and responsibilities.

==== Copa Simon Bolivar ====
Although the oldest league in Bolivia, Copa Simón Bolívar now ranks second in the hierarchy of Bolivian football since the split of Bolivia's top clubs in 1977 to form the La Liga. The Copa Simon Bolivar has 18 member clubs evenly divided among three groups, to qualify for this cup club from Primera A (champions and runner-up). Despite the organisational split, promotion and relegation of clubs still takes place between the Primera A and the Primera B.

=== Qualification for CONMEBOL competitions ===
Clubs who do well in either the La Liga, Copa Aerosur or Copa Simon Bolivar can qualify to compete in various CONMEBOL-organised South America-wide competitions in the following season. The number of Bolivian clubs playing in South America in any one season can range from six to eight, depending on the qualification scenarios or one of the Bolivian team who wins the Copa Libertadores or Copa Sudamericana.

Competition	Who Qualifies	Notes
Copa Libertadores	Torneo Apertura Champion	
Copa Libertadores	Torneo Clausura Champion	
Copa Libertadores First Stage	Club finishing 2nd in the Torneo Clausura.	
Copa Sudamericana Second Stage	Club finishing 2nd in the Torneo Apertura.	
Copa Sudamericana First Stage	Torneo de Invierno winners (English: Winter Tournament)	
Copa Sudamericana First Stage	Club finishing 3rd in the Torneo Clausura.	

=== Defunct cup competitions ===
Defunct cup competitions include:

- Copa Bolivia (1976–2002)
- Copa Departamental (1984–1999)

== Football stadiums in Bolivia by capacity ==
Venues with a capacity of at least 30,000 are included.

#	Stadium	Capacity	City	Home team
1	Estadio Hernando Siles	41,143	La Paz	Bolivia, Club Bolivar, The Strongest
2	Estadio Ramón Tahuichi Aguilera	38,000	Santa Cruz de la Sierra	Oriente Petrolero, Club Blooming, Club Destroyers
3	Estadio Jesús Bermúdez	33,795	Oruro	Club San José
4	Estadio Víctor Agustín Ugarte	32,105	Potosí	Real Potosí, Nacional Potosí
5	Estadio Felix Capriles	32,000	Cochabamba	Club Jorge Wilstermann, Club Aurora
6	Estadio Olímpico Patria	30,700	Sucre	Club Universitario, Independiente Petrolero

== Attendances ==
The average attendance per top-flight football league season and the club with the highest average attendance:

Season	League average	Best club	Best club average
2016-17 Apertura	6,872	Club Bolívar	13,901

== See also ==
- Bolivia national football team
