= Gustavo Romanello =

Argentine footballer

Personal information
- Full name: Gustavo Luis Romanello
- Date of birth: 11 September 1972 (age 54)
- Place of birth: Rosario, Argentina
- Position: Forward

Team information
- Current team: Real Tomayapo (assistant)

Senior career*
Years	Team	Apps	(Gls)
1991–1992	Argentinos Juniors	0	(0)
1992–1993	Villa Dálmine	11	(1)
1993–1994	Defensores de Belgrano	0	(0)
1994–1995	Sportivo Italiano	21	(0)
1995	Inter de Tijuana		
1996	Rochester Rhinos		
1996	Montreal Impact	3	(1)
1996–1997	Marathón		
1997	Vida		
1998	Oriente Petrolero	12	(4)
1999	Deportivo Táchira	7	(4)
1999	Unión Tarija		
2000	Mariscal Braun	26	(8)
2000	Deportivo Italchacao		
2001	Estudiantes de Mérida	13	(5)
2002-2003	Unión Tarija		
2004	Aurora	23	(7)
2005	Unión Tarija		
2005	Universitario de Sucre		
2006	Universitario de Tarija		

Managerial career
- 2007–2008: Unión Tarija
- 2009: Yaracuyanos (assistant)
- 2009: Real Mamoré
- 2009–2010: Ferro Carril Sud
- 2011: Ciclón de Tarija
- 2011–2012: Racing de Olavarría
- 2012: Petrolero
- 2012–2013: García Agreda
- 2013–2014: Yaracuyanos
- 2014: Ciclón de Tarija
- 2015: Unión Maestranza
- 2016: Ciclón de Tarija
- 2017–2018: Atlético El Vigía
- 2021: Trujillanos
- 2021–2022: Ferro Carril Sud
- 2022: Destroyers
- 2024–: Real Tomayapo (assistant)
- 2024: Real Tomayapo (interim)
- * Club domestic league appearances and goals

Gustavo Luis Romanello (born 11 September 1972) is an Argentine football manager and former player who played as a forward. He is the current assistant manager of Bolivian club Real Tomayapo.
