= Juan Pablo Grass =

Bolivian football and manager (born 1980)

Personal information
- Full name: Juan Pablo Grass Galvez
- Date of birth: 6 June 1980 (age 46)
- Place of birth: Bermejo, Bolivia
- Position: Forward

Team information
- Current team: Independiente Petrolero (interim)

Youth career
- The Strongest

Senior career*
Years	Team	Apps	(Gls)
1997	The Strongest		(0)
1998–2000	Independiente Petrolero		(23)
2001	Real Potosí		(9)
2002	Independiente Petrolero		(4)
2003	Stormers San Lorenzo		
2004–2006	Real Potosí		(8)
2006	Fancesa		(4)
2007	Independiente Petrolero		
2016	Fancesa		
2017	Alcalá		

International career
1999	Bolivia U20		

Managerial career
- Independiente Petrolero (youth)
- 2022: Independiente Petrolero (interim)
- 2023: Independiente Petrolero
- 2024: Nacional Sucre
- 2026–: Independiente Petrolero (assistant)
- 2026–: Independiente Petrolero (interim)
- * Club domestic league appearances and goals

Juan Pablo Grass Galvez (born 6 June 1980) is a Bolivian football manager and former player who played as a forward. He is the current interim manager of Independiente Petrolero.

== Playing career ==
Born in Bermejo, Grass made his senior debut with The Strongest on 16 March 1997, in a 2–0 win over Independiente Petrolero. He moved to the latter club in the following year, scoring 23 league goals within three seasons.

Grass spent the 2001 season with Real Potosí, before returning to Independiente in the following year. He then represented Stormers San Lorenzo in the 2003 campaign, before rejoining Potosí in 2004.

Grass played for Fancesa in 2006, before rejoining Independiente for a third spell in 2007. He also played for Fancesa in 2016, before appearing with Alcalá in the following year.

At international level, Grass represented the Bolivia national under-20 team in the 1999 South American U-20 Championship.

== Managerial career ==
After retiring, Grass worked as manager of the youth teams of his main club Independiente. On 9 September 2022, he was named interim manager of the first team, after Marcelo Robledo resigned. In November, he was named manager for the upcoming season, after Rodrigo Venegas left.

On 16 February 2023, with just three matches into the new campaign, Grass was sacked. After managing Nacional Sucre in the following year, he returned to Independiente in 2026, being initially an assistant before being appointed interim on 6 August of that year.
