= Saúl Torres =

Bolivian footballer (born 1990)

Personal information
- Full name: Saúl Torres Rojas
- Date of birth: 22 March 1990 (age 36)
- Place of birth: Sucre, Bolivia
- Height: 1.80 m (5 ft 11 in)
- Position: Right back

Team information
- Current team: Nacional Potosí
- Number: 7

Senior career*
| Years | Team | Apps | (Gls) |
| 2007–2008 | Independiente Petrolero | | |
| 2009–2010 | Fancesa | | |
| 2011–2012 | Flamengo de Sucre | | |
| 2012–2014 | Universitario de Sucre | 40 | (0) |
| 2014–2015 | Real Potosí | 23 | (2) |
| 2015–2016 | Universitario de Sucre | 22 | (0) |
| 2017 | Real Potosí | 33 | (1) |
| 2018–2019 | Nacional Potosí | 56 | (2) |
| 2019–2023 | The Strongest | 118 | (4) |
| 2024 | San José | 35 | (4) |
| 2025– | Nacional Potosí | 28 | (2) |

International career^{‡}
| 2019– | Bolivia | 4 | (0) |
- * Club domestic league appearances and goals as of 28 December 2025 ‡ National team caps and goals as of 01:33, 3 January 2023 (UTC)

Saúl Torres Rojas (born 20 March 1990) is a Bolivian professional footballer who plays for Nacional Potosí and Bolivia national football team as a right back.

== Club career ==
From Chuquisaca Department, Torres featured for Universitario de Sucre and played for Nacional Potosí prior to finding prominence as a full-back playing for The Strongest, for whom he was nominated for best full-back/midfielder in Bolivian football at the Cábala magazine awards in January 2023. Later playing for San José, he rejoined Nacional Potosí ahead of the 2025 season.

== International career ==
On 3 March 2019 Torres made his debut for the Bolivia national football team against Nicaragua.
