= Jesús Bermúdez =

Bolivian footballer (1902-1945)

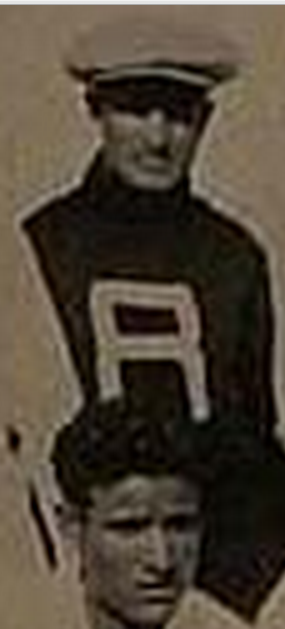
- Jesús Bermúdez during 1930 FIFA World Cup

Personal information
- Full name: Jesús Bermudez Tórrez
- Date of birth: 24 January 1902
- Place of birth: Oruro, Bolivia
- Date of death: 3 January 1945 (aged 42)
- Height: 1.69 m (5 ft 6 1/2 in)
- Position: Goalkeeper

Senior career*
Years	Team	Apps	(Gls)
1925–1932	Oruro Royal		

International career
1926–1930	Bolivia	8	(0)
- * Club domestic league appearances and goals

Jesús Bermúdez Tórrez (24 January 1902 – 3 January 1945) was a Bolivian footballer who played as a goalkeeper. He was a member of the Bolivia national team in the 1926 South American Championship, the 1927 South American Championship, and the 1930 FIFA World Cup. He saved 45 goals in 8 games.

== Club career ==
He played for Oruro Royal. Oruro stadium, Estadio Jesús Bermúdez, is named after him.

== Personal life ==
His wife, Alicia Tobar Loayza (September 15, 1904 – August 19, 2015), died aged 110. They had four children.
