= 2010 Primera B =

Primera B
- Season: 2010

This is the 14th season of Primera B Leagues. The 2010 format would be as the same as every year: the Champion and Runner-up of each Department would be promoted to the 2011 Bolivian Football Regional Leagues also known as Primera A.

== Cochabamba ==
Pos	Team	Pld	W	D	L	GF	GA	GD	Pts	Promotion or relegation
1	Dinamo	7	6	0	1	26	6	+20	18	Promotion to 2011 Primera A
2	Pelota de Trapo	7	6	0	1	20	8	+12	18	Promotion to 2011 Primera A
3	Escuela Tiquipaya	7	4	1	2	12	10	+2	13	
4	Ayacucho	7	4	1	2	13	12	+1	13	
5	Colcapirhua	7	3	2	2	11	9	+2	11	
6	San Antonio	7	2	1	4	13	23	−10	7	
7	LAN	7	1	3	3	8	13	−5	6	
8	Comteco	7	1	2	4	11	14	−3	5	
9	Botines de Oro	7	1	2	4	7	17	−10	5	Relegation to 2011 Ascenso
10	Litoral	7	0	3	4	5	16	−11	3	Relegation to 2011 Ascenso

Updated to match(es) played on https://ascensobolivia.blogspot.com/. Source: Ascensobolivia.blogspot
Rules for classification: 1) points; 2) goal difference; 3) number of goals scored.

== Santa Cruz ==
Pos	Team	Pld	W	D	L	GF	GA	GD	Pts	Promotion or relegation
1	The Strongest Taruma	16	11	3	2	55	14	+41	36	Promotion to 2011 Primera A
2	Talleres Yapacaní	16	8	4	4	35	30	+5	28	Promotion to 2011 Primera A
3	Máquina Vieja	16	8	2	6	24	10	+14	26	
4	Sebastián Pagador	16	8	2	6	15	10	+5	26	
5	San Martín	16	8	1	7	27	20	+7	25	
6	Bancruz Piraí	16	6	1	9	20	22	−2	19	
7	UPSA	16	5	2	9	10	18	−8	17	
8	Vanguard SC	16	5	0	11	16	9	+7	15	
9	Royal Pari	16	3	2	11	10	19	−9	11	Relegation to 2011 Ascenso
10	Estudiantes del Norte	16	1	3	12	14	55	−41	6	Relegation to 2011 Ascenso

Updated to match(es) played on https://acfprensa.blogspot.com/2010/05/primera-b-strongest-taruma-cerro-la.html. Source: ACF
Rules for classification: 1) points; 2) goal difference; 3) number of goals scored.

== Tarija ==
Pos	Team	Pld	W	D	L	GF	GA	GD	Pts	Promotion or relegation
1	Royal Obrero	5	3	2	0	13	8	+5	11	Promotion to 2011 Primera A
2	Nacional La Pampa	5	3	1	1	10	4	+6	10	Promotion to 2011 Primera A
3	San José de Tarija	5	3	1	1	10	7	+3	10	
4	15 de Abril	5	2	2	1	8	8	0	8	
5	Entel	5	2	1	2	11	8	+3	7	
6	Ingenieros	5	2	0	3	9	6	+3	6	
7	Chapaquito Feliz	5	1	0	4	7	11	−4	3	Relegation to 2011 Ascenso
8	Tabladita	5	0	1	4	3	13	−10	1	Relegation to 2011 Ascenso

Updated to match(es) played on https://ascensobolivia.blogspot.com/. Source: Ascensobolivia.blogspot
Rules for classification: 1) points; 2) goal difference; 3) number of goals scored.

== La Paz ==
Pos	Team	Pld	W	D	L	GF	GA	GD	Pts	Promotion or relegation
1	Ayuda Pais	14	7	3	4	23	18	+5	24	Promotion to 2011 Primera A
2	Atlético Alianza	14	7	2	5	18	13	+5	23	Promotion Playoff
3	Ferroviario	14	6	3	5	14	10	+4	21	
4	Universidad Loyola	14	4	4	6	13	13	0	16	
5	Chaco Petrolero	14	4	3	7	14	18	−4	15	
6	Jerusalem	14	4	1	9	12	15	−3	13	
7	Always Ready	14	3	2	9	8	13	−5	11	
8	16 de Julio	14	2	4	8	10	17	−7	10	Relegation to 2011 Ascenso

Updated to match(es) played on https://ascensobolivia.blogspot.com/. Source: Ascensobolivia.blogspot
Rules for classification: 1) points; 2) goal difference; 3) number of goals scored.
