= Yesit Martínez =

Bolivian footballer (born 2002)

Personal information
- Full name: Yesit Martínez Salazar
- Date of birth: 31 January 2002 (age 24)
- Place of birth: Sucre, Bolivia
- Height: 1.70 m (5 ft 7 in)
- Position: Winger

Team information
- Current team: Aurora
- Number: 16

Youth career
- Independiente Petrolero

Senior career*
Years	Team	Apps	(Gls)
2021–2023	Independiente Petrolero	74	(4)
2024–	Aurora	0	(0)

International career^{‡}
2022–	Bolivia	2	(0)
- * Club domestic league appearances and goals as of 24 August 2023 ‡ National team caps and goals as of 24 August 2023

Yesit Martínez (born 31 January 2002) is a Bolivian professional footballer who plays as a winger for Aurora.
