= Cristino Jara =

Paraguayan footballer (born 1973)

Alfredo Cristino Jara Mereles (born 2 May 1973, in Capiatá) is an association football forward from Paraguay, who is currently playing for Nacional Potosi in Bolivia. He was the topscorer in the Liga de Fútbol Profesional Boliviano 2006, scoring 35 goals (Apertura and Clausura). Jara previously played for Club 12 de Octubre, Marathón, Real Santa Cruz, Club Jorge Wilstermann, Oriente Petrolero, and Club Real Potosí.
