= Bolivian football league system =

System of football league

The Bolivian football league system is a series of interconnected leagues for association football clubs in Bolivia.

== Overview ==
At the top is the División de Fútbol Profesional Boliviano (first division) with 14 clubs. Below the 1st level is the Copa Simón Bolívar (second division). In order to qualify for the Copa Simón Bolívar there are 9 subdivisions at the 3rd level: the Departmental Championships or Regional Leagues, which comprises teams from the different Departments of Bolivia: Santa Cruz, La Paz, Cochabamba, Chuquisaca, Oruro, Tarija Department, Beni Department, Pando Department and Potosí.

== Current system ==
Level	League/Division(s)	
1	Bolivian Primera División; 16 clubs	
	↓↑ 1 or 2 club(s)	
2	Copa Simón Bolívar (Bolivia); 37 or 38 clubs 3 best-placed of each level 3 regional league + Torneo Interprovincial departmental winners + relegated team from Primera División	
3	Chuquisaca Football Association Championship; Primera A 15 clubs	Cochabamba Football Association Championship; Primera A 9 clubs (12 in Apertura)
	La Paz Football Association Championships; Primera A 10 clubs	Oruro Football Association Championship; Primera A 12 clubs
	Santa Cruz Association Championship; Primera A 13 clubs	Potosí Football Association Championship; Primera A 12 clubs
	Tarija Football Association Championship; Primera A 15 clubs	Pando Football Association Championship; Primera A 10 clubs
	Beni Football Association Championship; Primera A 16 clubs	Torneo Nacional Interprovincial (now joint to Copa Simón Bolívar as 1st phase); 9 clubs
4	same as level 3 except Primera B (second division) for each regional league	
