= Club Bolivar Nimbles =

Bolivian football club

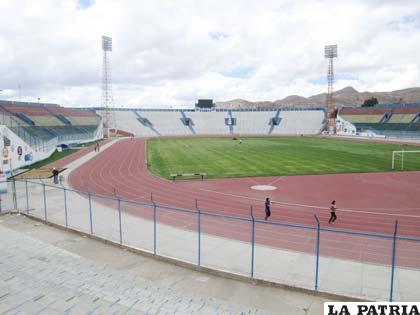
- Estadio Jesus Bermudez
- Full name: Club Bolivar Nimbles de Oruro
- Founded: July 24, 1908
- Ground: Estadio Jesús Bermúdez; Oruro, Bolivia
- Capacity: 32,000
- League: Bolivian Football Regional Leagues

Club Bolívar Nimbles is a football club from the city of Oruro, Bolivia, playing at the second level of Bolivian football. It was founded the 24th of July 1908. The club plays its games as local at the Stadium Jesus Bermudez. Is the second oldest football club from Oruro and one of the oldest in the country. It has won one Bolivian Football Regional Championships, in 1998.
