= Club García Agreda =

Bolivian football club

García Agreda
- Full name: Club García Agreda
- Nickname(s): Panoseños
- Founded: 28 February 1948; 77 years ago
- Ground: Estadio IV Centenário; Tarija, Bolivia
- Capacity: 15,000
- President: Juan Carlos Vargas
- Manager: Luis Darío Vides
- League: Copa Simón Bolívar; Primera A ATF
- 2023 2023: Copa Simón Bolívar, 34th of 40; Primera A ATF, 3rd of 16
Home colours

Club García Agreda are a Bolivian Professional Football Club based in Tarija. The team plays its home matches at Estadio IV Centenário. The club currently competes at Tarija Primera A. In October 2010 Garcia eliminated Ciclon in 2010 Copa Simon Bolivar and left them with only 1 point and no opportunity of reaching First Division In 2011 Club García Agreda is the champion at Tarija Primera A. They win the championship unconquered (invicto)

== National honours ==
- First Division – Professional Era:
  - Champions: 1
  - Runners-Up : 15
- Bolivian Football Regional Championships:
  - Champions:
  - Runners-Up : 1 (2010)
