= Deportivo Warnes =

Bolivian football club

- Full name: Deportivo Warnes
- Nickname(s): Los del Norte
- Founded: September 23, 1979
- Ground: Estadio Samuel Vaca Jimenez; Warnes, Santa Cruz
- Capacity: 9,000
- League: Bolivian Football Regional Leagues

Deportivo Warnes is a football club from Santa Cruz, Bolivia currently playing at Santa Cruz Primera A. The club was founded September 23, 1996 by Brazilian engineers, and they play their home games at the Estadio Samuel Vaca Jimenez.
