= César Lamanna =

Argentine footballer

Personal information
- Full name: César Adrián Lamanna
- Date of birth: January 7, 1987 (age 39)
- Place of birth: Pehuajó, Argentina
- Height: 1.87 m (6 ft 2 in)
- Position: Centre forward

Senior career*
Years	Team	Apps	(Gls)
2006–2008	Chacarita Juniors	4	(0)
2008–2009	Colegiales	21	(1)
2009–2010	Estudiantes	32	(12)
2010–2012	San Lorenzo	0	(0)
2012	→ Platense (loan)		
2012–2013	Almirante Brown	6	(0)
2013–2014	Deportivo Merlo	13	(1)
2014	Atlético Colegiales	9	(0)
- * Club domestic league appearances and goals

César Adrián Lamanna (born 7 January 1987) is an Argentine football centre forward.
