= Club Deportivo Universidad Cruceña =

Bolivian football club

Universidad Cruceña
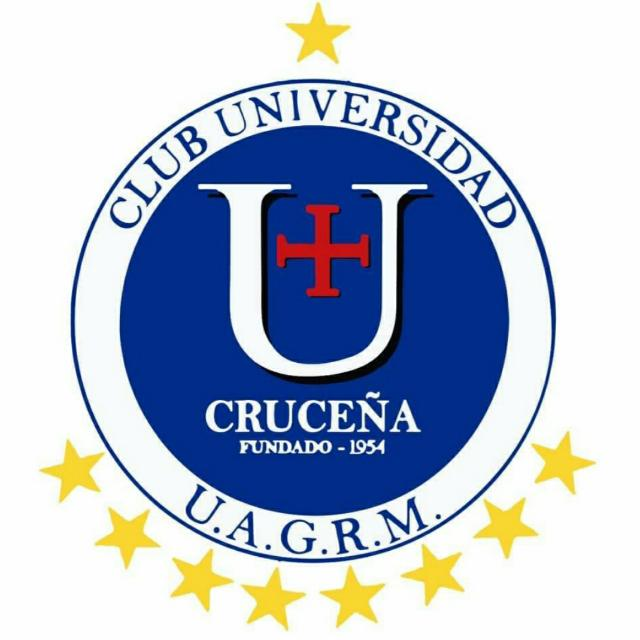
- Full name: Club Deportivo Universidad Cruceña
- Nickname: La U
- Founded: 24 April 1954; 72 years ago
- Ground: Estadio de la UAGRM; Santa Cruz de la Sierra, Bolivia
- Capacity: 4,000
- Chairman: Carlos Martínez Bonilla
- Manager: Joaquín Monasterio
- League: Primera A ACF
- 2023 2023: Copa Simón Bolívar, 32nd of 40; Primera A ACF, 6th of 15
Home colours	Away colours

Club Deportivo Universidad Cruceña, commonly known as Universidad, is a Bolivian football club based in Santa Cruz de la Sierra, Bolivia. Currently, it competes in the Liga Nacional B. The club was founded March 24, 1954. The team's home base is the Estadio Ramón Tahuichi Aguilera.
