= Academia Deportiva Fancesa =

Bolivian football club

Fancesa
- Full name: Academia Deportiva Fancesa
- Nickname(s): Rubronegro; Cementeros
- Founded: 10 March 1965; 60 years ago
- Ground: Olímpico Patria
- Capacity: 30,700
- President: Eduardo Ayala
- Head coach: Alex Martínez
- League: Copa Simón Bolívar; Primera A ACHF
- 2023 2023: Copa Simón Bolívar, 17th of 40; Primera A ACHF, 2nd of 12
Home colours

Academia Deportiva Fancesa is a Bolivian football club based in Sucre, Chuquisaca. The club was founded on 10 March 1965, and compete in the Bolivian Football Regional Leagues, holding home matches at the Estadio Olímpico Patria, with a capacity of 30,700 people.

== History ==
Named after the Fábrica Nacional de Cemento S.A. (FANCESA), the club reached the final of the Copa Simón Bolívar in 2002, missing out a direct promotion after losing to Aurora. They also lost the promotion/relegation play-off against Independiente Petrolero, and remained in the second division.

The club was also one of the participants of the 2022 Copa Bolivia, but the tournament was cancelled.
