= Flamengo de Sucre =

Bolivian football club

Flamengo
- Full name: Flamengo de Sucre
- Founded: 27 May 1966; 58 years ago
- Ground: Estadio Olímpico Patria; Sucre, Bolivia
- Capacity: 32,000
- Chairman: Juan Ortega
- Manager: Guido Campos
- League: Primera A ACHF
- 2023: Primera A ACHF, 10th of 12
Home colors	Away colors	Third colors

Flamengo de Sucre is a Bolivian football club from Sucre, Chuquisaca Department.

== History ==
Flamengo de Sucre was founded on May 27, 1966 as Club Atlético Flamengo (or CAFLA) by Bolivian supporters of Brazilian club Clube de Regatas do Flamengo. Some time later, the club was renamed to the same name of the Brazilian club.

The club joined the Liga Profesional de Sucre (Sucre Professional League) in 1977. The club competed in the league for three consecutive years, but, due to an amateur administration and lack of resources, the club was eventually relegated to the second division.

The club closed its professional football section in 1989. In 1996 the Bolivian president re-opened the club. As of 2010 they play in Chuquisaca Primera A.

On June 21, 2011, Flamengo de Sucre won the Primera "A", organized by the Association Football of Chuquisaca(ACHF), for the first time in its 46 years of institutional life, defeating in the Torneo Adequación final the Club Fancesa 2–1 in a match played at the Estadio Patria.

== Other sports ==
The club is still active in other sports, such as futsal.

== Achievements ==
- Chuquisaca Primera A:
  - Winners (1): 2011
