= Mariscal Braun =

Association football club in Bolivia

- Full name: Club Deportivo Mariscal Braun de La Paz
- Nicknames: Los Cerveceros (The Brewers); La Familia Negriblanca (The Black and White Family) "Manchester Brown"
- Founded: 25 August 1952; 74 years ago
- Stadium: Hernando Siles; La Paz, Bolivia
- Capacity: 42,000
- President: Dr. Luis Alípaz
- Manager: Marcelo “Machi” Palomeque
- League: Primera B AFLP
- 2023: Primera B AFLP, 7th of 12
- Website: http://www.mariscalbraun.com
Home colours

Club Mariscal Braun is a football club based in the city of La Paz, Bolivia, which currently competes in the La Paz Regional League. They were founded on August 25, 1952 by the workers of the Cervecería Boliviana Nacional, It is for this reason that they are popularly known as "the beer group" or "the brewers". Their name is a tribute to the Marshal of Montenegro, Otto Philipp Braun.

They play their home games at the Estadio Hernando Siles, with the capacity for 42,000 spectators.

They were the champion of the La Paz Regional League seven times, and runners-up in the Copa Simón Bolívar in 1999.

They participated in the Bolivian Liga de Fútbol Profesional Boliviano between 2000 and 2002, being relegated in that last season.

== History ==
=== Foundation ===
The Mariscal Braun Club was founded on August 25, 1952 by the workers of the Cervecería Boliviana Nacional (CBN), the name is a tribute to marshal Otto Philipp Braun.

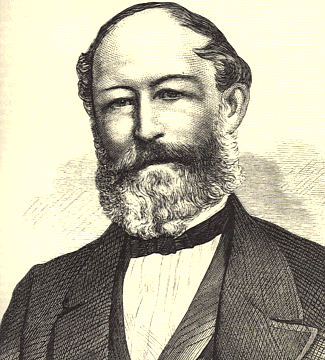
Marshal Otto Philipp Braun in the year 1868 at his 70 years of age.

They were members of the National Bolivian Brewery who, at the head of the gentlemen: Ramón Manuel Zapata, Ángel Fuentes, Francisco Sánchez, Dario Ortiz, Mario Maldonado, Hugo Córdova, Ismael Prieto, Carlos Buezo, Evaristo Roncal, Hugo A. Valencia, among others; they started the 'black and white' institution exercising as part of the club's first directory.

In the Amateur era of football, Club Mariscal Braun won its first title in the La Paz Football Association in the year 1982 after beating Litoral. In 1988, Mariscal Braun achieved his second star at the expense of Chaco Petrolero. Starting in the late 1980s, it was where the 'Cervecero' team began to position itself among the best teams in the city, demonstrating identity and good team play.

For four consecutive years (from 1990 to 1994), Mariscal Braun was runner-up in the AFLP tournament after losing in the finals against Litoral, Chaco Petrolero (twice) and Always Ready . The club was again runner-up in 1996 and 1998, losing the finals to La Paz F.C. (Former Atlético Gonzales) and Litoral respectively.

In 1999, under the presidency of Dr. Luis Alípaz, Mariscal Braun achieved his third title in the AFLP, after beating Litoral. That same year he participated in the 'Simón Bolívar' promotion tournament where he won the runner-up position (defeat on penalties) against Club Atlético Pompeya. Despite this, the 'Cervecero' team manages to win the indirect relegation in a dramatic final to San José, in the first leg they lost in Oruro 1:0 and in the return manages to win 2:1 in the Global they were even (2:2) so it was defined in the penalty kicks where Braun was victorious by 4 to 3 and manages to climb to the Bolivian Primera División for the first time.

=== Bolivian Primera División era ===
In her first season in the league she played her first match against The Strongest on February 6 with adverse result 0:1.

Mariscal Braun participated in the Liga de Fútbol Profesional Boliviano from 2000 to 2002, managing to generate respect from his opponents and sympathy from soccer lovers nationwide. After two years in the top seat of national football, Braun was downgraded.

=== Hegemony ===
In his return to the AFLP tournament, in 2003 Mariscal Braun achieved a new sub-championship after losing the final against La Paz F.C. The years 2005, 2006 and 2007 were unforgettable after winning the three-time championship where the "Cervecera" squad demonstrated hegemony in La Paz football. In 2008 a second place was achieved against ABB so that two years later (2010) the "Blanquinegros" could get rid of the thorn and get their 7th. title.

After 10 years Mariscal Braun returns to recover the seat that corresponds to him.

== Leadership ==
This is the current directive of Club Mariscal Braun for the 2020 season:

- President: Dr. Luis Alípaz.
- Vice President: Ricardo Alípaz.
- 2nd. Vice President: Damian Grisi.
- 3rd. Vice President: Gabriel Alípaz.
- General Secretary: Mateo Pacheco.
- Attorney General: Mateo Alípaz.
- Finance area: Pablo Suárez.
- Sports area: Francesco Foglino
- Sports area: Alexander Brockman.
- Sports area: Marcelo Palomeque.
- Marketing Area: Gabriel Kavlin.
- Communication Area: José Garrón.
- Communication area: Juan Camilo Arenas.
- International Relations: Pablo Tavera
- International Relations: Benjamin Rivas

== Symbols ==
=== Shield ===
The coat of arms of Club Mariscal Braun was modified on one occasion. The club made a series of minor changes in 2020. These modifications are the first to be made to the shield since 1952.

== Clothing ==
The representative colors of Club Mariscal Braun are white and black.

== Facilities ==
=== Stadium ===
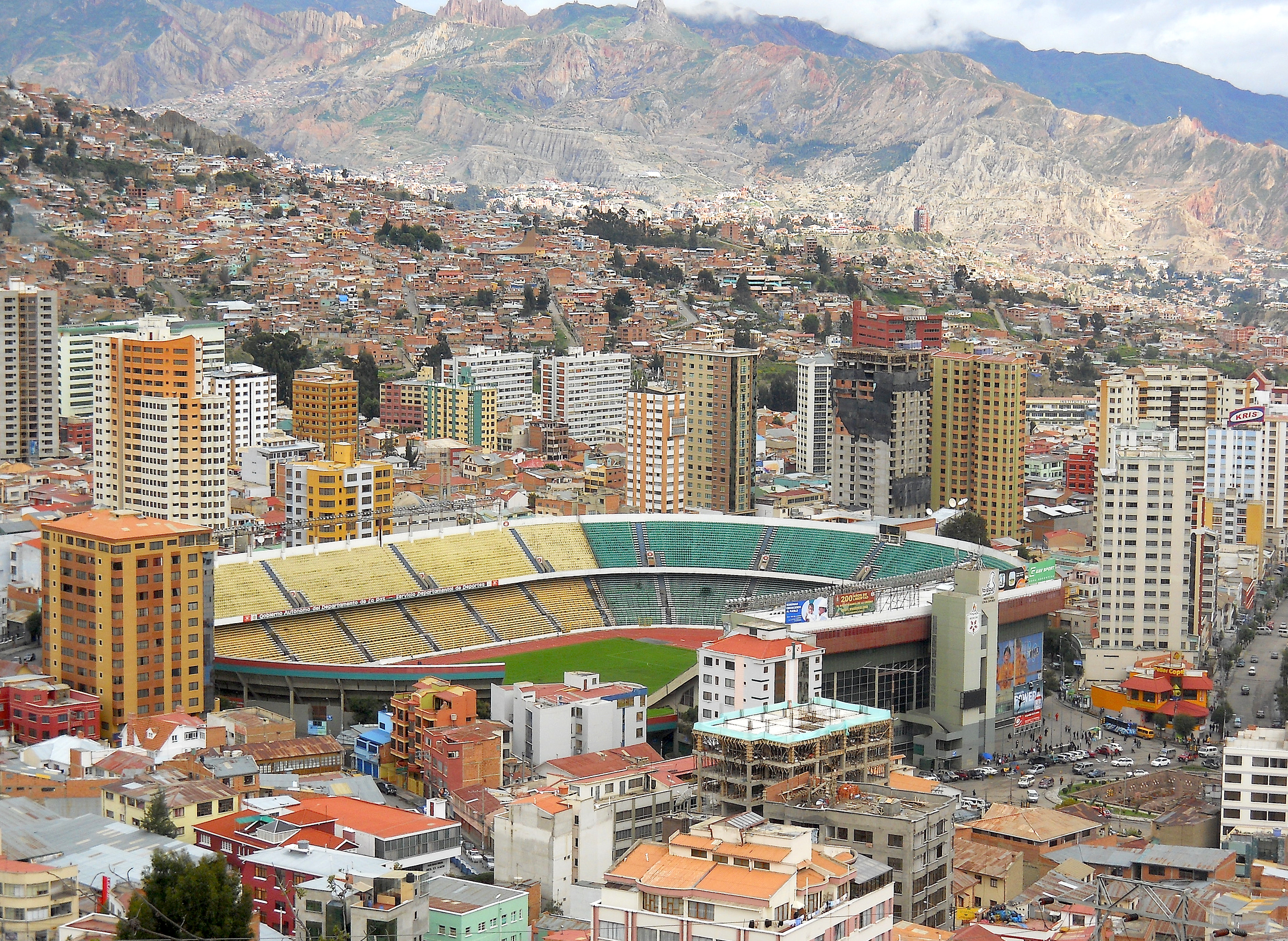
View of the stadium from the Miraflores neighborhood.

It plays its home games at the Hernando Siles Stadium in La Paz, the largest in the country. Inaugurated in 1931, the venue has a capacity for 45,143 spectators, and has hosted three Copas América, numerous qualifying matches for the World Cup FIFA

The stadium is located in the Miraflores neighborhood, at an altitude of 3,601 meters above sea level, making it one of the highest professional stadiums in the world.

=== Promotions and relegations ===
- 1999: Promoted from the Copa Simón Bolívar to the Bolivian Primera División.
- 2002: Relegation from the Bolivian Primera División to the La Paz Regional League.

== Awards ==
=== National tournaments ===
Bolivia Regional competition	Titles	Runners
Copa Simón Bolívar		1999. (1)

=== Regional tournaments (7) ===
La Paz Regional competition	Titles	Runners
La Paz Regional League (7)	1982, 1988, 1999, 2005, 2006, 2007, 2010.	1990, 1991, 1992, 1993, 1996, 1998, 2003, 2008. (8)
