= Club Atlético Ciclón =

Bolivian football club

Ciclón
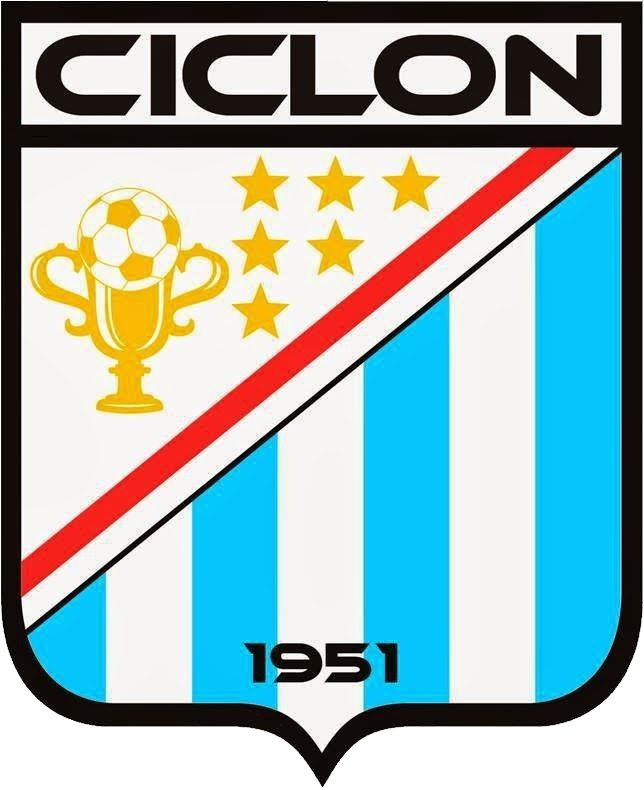
- Full name: Club Atlético Ciclón
- Nicknames: Albiceleste; Ciclón de la Pampa; El Capo del Sur; El equipo pampeño
- Founded: 21 September 1951; 74 years ago
- Ground: Estadio IV Centenario; Tarija, Bolivia
- Capacity: 15,000
- Chairman: Carlos Yeske
- Manager: Milton Maygua
- League: Copa Simón Bolívar; Primera A ATF
- 2023 2023: Copa Simón Bolívar, 30th of 40; Primera A ATF, 5th of 16
Home colours	Away colours

Club Atlético Ciclón, most commonly known as Ciclón de Tarija, is a football club from Tarija, Bolivia currently playing in the Liga de Fútbol Profesional Boliviano (LFPB). The club was founded on September 21, 1951, and they play their home games at the Estadio IV Centenario. Ciclón competed in the LFPB from 1985 until its relegation in 1995. The team recently won the second division Nacional B championship and promotion to the LFPB for the 2015–16 season.

== National honours ==
- First Division – Professional Era: 0
- Liga Nacional B: 1

2014-2015

- Second Division, Copa Simón Bolivar: 1

1984

== Managers ==
- (Paraguay) Arturo Galarza (1985)
- (Argentina) Juan de la Cruz Kairuz (1994)
- (Argentina) Aniceto Roldán (1995)
- (Argentina) Víctor Palomba (1995)
- (Bolivia) David Vargas (2006)
- (Bolivia) Mario Rolando Ortega (2009)
- (Argentina) Norberto Kekez (2010)
- (Argentina) Gustavo Romanello (2011)
- (Bolivia) Milton Maygua (2012)
- (Argentina) Óscar Sanz (2013)
- (Bolivia) Fernando Salinas (2014)
- (Argentina) Víctor Hugo Andrada (2015-2016)
- (Argentina) Gustavo Romanello (2016)
- (Bolivia) Milton Maygua (2017)
- (Argentina) César Couceiro (2018)
- (Argentina) Cristian Bernadas (2018)
- (Bolivia) Juan Carlos Ríos (2019)
- (Bolivia) Milton Maygua (2019)
- (Argentina) Claudio Mir (2019)
- (Argentina) Roberto Carlos Sosa (2020)
- (Bolivia) Luis Palacios (2021)
- (Bolivia) Milton Maygua (2021)
- (Argentina) Omar Silva (2021)
- (Argentina) Raúl Musuruana (2021)
- (Argentina) Daniel Ayala (2021)
- (Argentina) César Lamanna (2021)
- (Bolivia) Milton Maygua (2021)
- (Bolivia) Horacio Pacheco (2023)
- (Bolivia) Luis Palacios (2023)
- (Argentina) Gerardo Reinoso (2023)
- (Paraguay) Pablo Godoy (2023)
- (Bolivia) Milton Maygua (2024-)
