= Estadio Olímpico Patria =

Multi-purpose stadium in Sucre, Bolivia

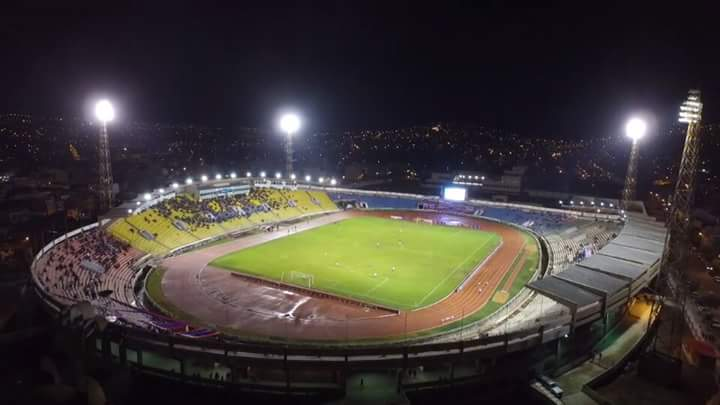
- Interactive map of Estadio Olímpico Patria
- Location: Sucre, Bolivia
- Coordinates: 19.0323°S 65.2579°W
- Elevation: 2,814 m (9,232 ft)
- Capacity: 30,700

Construction
- Opened: 1992

Tenants
- Universitario; Independiente Petrolero; Fancesa

Estadio Olímpico Patria is a multi-purpose stadium in Sucre, capital of Bolivia. It is currently used for football matches and is the home venue for Universitario de Sucre and Independiente Petrolero, and was used for the 1997 Copa América. The stadium holds 30,700 and was opened in 1992.
