= Real Santa Cruz =

Bolivian football club

- Full name: Club Real Santa Cruz
- Nickname(s): Albos; Merengues; Criollos del Sur; León Blanco del Pajonal; Orgullo Camba
- Founded: 3 May 1962; 63 years ago
- Ground: Estadio Real Santa Cruz, Santa Cruz de la Sierra
- Capacity: 14,000
- Chairman: Carlos Sánchez
- Manager: Armando Ibáñez
- League: ACF Primera A
- 2024: División Profesional, 16th of 16 (relegated)
Home colours	Away colours

Club Real Santa Cruz is a football club from Santa Cruz, Bolivia currently playing in the Santa Cruz Football Association Championship after relegation from the top-flight División Profesional in 2024. The club last played in the first division in 2004; they also played the Copa Bolivia in 2001, when they became runners-up. They play their home games at the Estadio Real Santa Cruz.

== History ==
The club was formed on 3 May 1962.

== Achievements ==
=== Domestic ===
- Second Division, Copa Simón Bolívar
  - Champions (1): 1993
  - Runners-up (1): 2019
- Copa Bolivia
  - Runners-up (1): 2001

== Players ==
Note: Flags indicate national team as defined under FIFA eligibility rules; some limited exceptions apply. Players may hold more than one non-FIFA nationality.

No.	Pos.	Nation	Player
1	GK	(Bolivia) BOL	Diego Zamora
2	DF	(Ecuador) ECU	Luis Ruano
3	DF	(Bolivia) BOL	Walter Antelo
4	FW	(Dominican Republic) DOM	Brian Lopez
5	MF	(Bolivia) BOL	Luis Coplot
6	MF	(Bolivia) BOL	Mario Ovando
7	MF	(Bolivia) BOL	Angel Sanchez
9	FW	(Nicaragua) NCA	Anderson Treminio
10	MF	(Bolivia) BOL	Limberg Gutierrez
11	FW	(Bolivia) BOL	Andree Navia
12	GK	(Bolivia) BOL	Jimmy Roca
14	MF	(Dominican Republic) DOM	Jean Lopez
15	MF	(Bolivia) BOL	Saul Rueda
16	DF	(Bolivia) BOL	Luis Ardaya

No.	Pos.	Nation	Player
17	MF	(Bolivia) BOL	Jose Lara
18	MF	(Bolivia) BOL	Alan Mercado
19	DF	(Bolivia) BOL	Brian Hinojosa
20	FW	(Dominican Republic) DOM	Yohan Parra
23	MF	(Bolivia) BOL	Samuel Pozo
24	DF	(Bolivia) BOL	Denilson Choque
26	MF	(Bolivia) BOL	Marcos Barrios
27	MF	(Bolivia) BOL	Luis Condarco
30	DF	(Bolivia) BOL	Ricardo Suarez
31	MF	(Bolivia) BOL	Imanol Cardenas
33	DF	(Bolivia) BOL	Juan Rivero
36	GK	(Bolivia) BOL	Omar Ledezma
39	MF	(Bolivia) BOL	Gerson Malgor
