= Copa Simón Bolívar (Bolivia) =

- Founded: 1957; 1958–1976 (as Division One); 1989–2010 and 2016– (as Division Two)
- Number of clubs: 65 (2024)
- Level on pyramid: 2
- Promotion to: Bolivian Primera División
- Relegation to: Bolivian Football Regional Leagues
- Current champions: Real Potosí (2nd title) (2025)
- Most championships: Enrique Happ (3 times)
- Website: fbf.com.bo/torneos/copa-simon-bolivar/
- Current: 2026

Copa Simón Bolívar is the men's second professional association football division of the Bolivian football league system. Administered by the Bolivian Football Federation, its champions achieve automatic promotion to the Bolivian Primera División, while the runner-up feature in a play-off match with the 15th-placed team in the top tier.

== Format ==
With the Bolivian football pyramid consisting of nine regional leagues (one for each department – Chuquisaca, Cochabamba, La Paz, Oruro, Santa Cruz, Potosí, Tarija, Pando and Beni), the number of participants varies depending on the department, with usually seven or eight teams per department entering the regional stage. In the national stage, 24 clubs are divided into six groups of four teams each, with the top two and two best third-placed teams advancing to the knockout stages, where they advance in two-legged matches until the end of the competition.

== History ==
Logo of the 2021 edition

The oldest regional championship is the one played in La Paz, which started in 1914 and it was considered for many years as the top Bolivian league, even more when it turned into a semi-pro tournament in 1950 and started including teams from Oruro and Cochabamba. Copa Simón Bolívar started in 1960 as a cup tournament, initially with the participation of regional champions from La Paz, Cochabamba, Oruro and Santa Cruz. Years after, teams from other associations started joining the cup, and the tournament eventually had association runners-up participating as well.

Until 1976, due to the lack of a nationwide league, the cup determined the national champion and representative teams for the Copa Libertadores. With the creation of the Liga de Fútbol Profesional Boliviano, the Bolivian Football Federation stopped organizing the tournament. Copa Simón Bolívar (or Torneo Simón Bolívar) then returned in 1989 as a second division league tournament, but the last-placed team of the fist division was directly replaced by the regional champion of its region. In 1993, the champions of the Copa Simón Bolívar started to achieve automatic promotion to the top tier, while the runner-up played a play-off match against the second-to-bottom placed team in the first division.

In 2011, with the restructuring of the Bolivian football which changed to an "European calendar", Copa Simón Bolívar was replaced by the Liga Nacional B. In July 2016, after the lack of funding from the Liga de Fútbol Profesional Boliviano, Nacional B ended and Copa Simón Bolívar returned to an active status, with the previous system.

== List of champions ==
Ed.	Season	Champion	Runner-up
1	1989	Enrique Happ	Universidad Cruceña
2	1990	Universidad Cruceña	Naval Mamoré
3	1991	Enrique Happ	Guabirá
4	1992	Enrique Happ	Universidad Católica
5	1993	Real Santa Cruz	Estudiantes Frontanilla
6	1994	Stormers	Always Ready
7	1995	Deportivo Municipal	Chaco Petrolero
8	1996	Blooming	Universidad Cruceña
9	1997	Real Potosí	Universitario de Cochabamba
10	1998	Union Central	Atlético Pompeya
11	1999	Atlético Pompeya	Mariscal Braun
12	2000	Iberoamericana	Aurora
13	2001	San José	Primero de Mayo
14	2002	Aurora	Fancesa
15	2003	La Paz	Real Santa Cruz
16	2004	Destroyers	Primero de Mayo
17	2005	Universitario de Sucre	Guabirá
18	2006	Municipal Real Mamoré	Ciclón
19	2007	Guabirá	Nacional Potosí
20	2008	Nacional Potosí	Primero de Mayo
21	2009	Guabirá	Ciclón
22	2010	Nacional Potosí	Real América
–	2011–2016	The Liga Nacional B was played.	
23	2016–17	Aurora	Destroyers
24	2017	Royal Pari	Deportivo Kala
25	2018	Always Ready	Avilés Industrial
26	2019	Municipal Vinto	Real Santa Cruz
27	2020	Real Tomayapo	Independiente Petrolero
28	2021	Universitario de Vinto	Universitario de Sucre
29	2022	Vaca Díez	Libertad Gran Mamoré
30	2023	GV San José	San Antonio Bulo Bulo
31	2024	ABB	Totora Real Oruro
32	2025	Real Potosí	San Juan

- NB: Enrique Happ (full name Escuela Enrique Happ) from Cochabamba never promoted to the top flight in spite of winning the competition three times, because its founder Enrique Happ Kroll declined promotion in favour of maintaining its status as a football academy (like the better known Academia Tahuichi in Santa Cruz).

== Titles by club ==
Club	Titles	Seasons won
Enrique Happ	3	1989, 1991, 1992
Aurora	2	2002, 2016–17
Guabirá	2	2007, 2009
Nacional Potosí	2	2008, 2010
Real Potosí	2	1997, 2025
ABB	1	2024
Always Ready	1	2018
Atlético Pompeya	1	1999
Blooming	1	1996
Deportivo Municipal	1	1995
Destroyers	1	2004
GV San José	1	2023
Iberoamericana	1	2000
La Paz	1	2003
Municipal Real Mamoré	1	2006
Municipal Vinto	1	2019
Real Santa Cruz	1	1993
Royal Pari	1	2017
San José	1	2001
Stormers	1	1994
Unión Central	1	1998
Universidad Cruceña	1	1990
Universitario de Sucre	1	2005
Universitario de Vinto	1	2021
Vaca Díez	1	2022
