= Bolivian Football Regional Leagues =

The third tier of the Bolivian football league system consists of nine regional leagues (one for each department); the number of participants varies depending

on the department. It usually has between 8 and 12 teams. The winner and the runner-up of each league compete in the Copa Simón Bolívar, with the winner of such a tournament gaining promotion to the 1st Division, and the runner-up playing a play-off match with the last two placed teams in the First Division. Until 1976, all 8 regional championships (Pando didn't have an organized tournament at the time) were the top division of the national football pyramid, with the winner of the Copa Simón Bolívar being crowned as national champion.

The oldest regional championship is the one played in La Paz. It started in 1914 and it was considered for many years as the top Bolivian league, especially when it turned into a semi-professional tournament in 1950 and started to include teams from Oruro and Cochabamba.

== Copa Simón Bolívar ==
The tournament started in 1960. Initially, only champions from La Paz, Cochabamba, Oruro and Santa Cruz participated. In later years, teams from other associations joined the cup, and the tournament eventually also had runners-up participating.

Until 1976, with the lack of a nationwide league, the cup determined the national champion and representative teams for the Copa Libertadores. With the creation of the Liga de Fútbol Profesional Boliviano, the Bolivian FA stopped organizing the tournament.

In 1989, the tournament was resurrected, with the same format of both champions and runners-up from each association, but this time each regional league was the second tier on the football pyramid so the champion was supposed to be awarded a place in the professional league. Previously, the last placed team in the 1st division was replaced by the regional champion of its department. However, that practice was kept until 1993 when finally the champion was awarded a spot in the top league.

The competition format changes frequently. In 2008, the teams were divided into three groups of six teams, to save costs. Geographically close teams were teamed up and played on a home-away round-robin basis, with group 1 consisting of teams from La Paz, Oruro and Cochabamba; group 2 of teams from Potosí, Chuquisaca and Tarija, and group 3 of teams from Santa Cruz, Beni and Pando. The top two placed teams advanced to the next round, now playing play-offs on home-away basis, the three winners and the best loser advanced to the semifinals and then the final.

=== Liga Nacional B ===
It was announced by LFPB that, due to the change of football in First Division, Copa Simon Bolivar would be replaced by Liga Nacional B which consists of thirteen clubs, the champions from each department except for Tarija which would have two clubs (Champions and runner-up), the last two relegated teams from First division and the winners of Torneo Nacional Provincial. La Paz Football Association and Oruro Football Association Championship were against this change, however the National Football Association and Bolivian Football Federation approved this change in Bolivian Football.

== Beni Football Association Championship ==
Season	Champion	Runner-up
1989	Primero de Mayo	Naval Mamoré
1990	Primero de Mayo	Naval Mamoré
1991	Universitario	Primero de Mayo
1992	Universitario	Bolívar
1993	Atlético Pompeya	Ferrocarril San Antonio
1994	Bolívar	Universitario
1995	Universitario	Ingenieros
1996	Universitario	Huracán Tupiza
1997	Atlético Pompeya	Universitario
1998	Atlético Pompeya	Universitario
1999	Atlético Pompeya	Universitario
2000	Huracán Tupiza	Proyecto San José La Palmera
2001	Primero de Mayo	Universitario
2002	Primero de Mayo	Universitario
2003	Primero de Mayo	Universitario
2004	Primero de Mayo	Universitario
2005	Universitario	Real Mamoré
2006	Real Mamoré	Proyecto San José La Palmera
2007	Universitario	Primero de Mayo
2008	Primero de Mayo	Universitario
2009	Universitario	Primero de Mayo
2010	Primero de Mayo	Atlético Marbán
2011	Universitario	Primero de Mayo
2011–12	Universitario	Proyecto San José La Palmera
2012–13	Proyecto San José La Palmera	Universitario
2013–14	Universitario	Deportivo Kivón
2014–15	Universitario	Deportivo Kivón
2015–16	Universitario	Deportivo Kivón
2016–17	Universitario	San Lorenzo
2017 II	Deportivo Kivón	—N/a
2018 I	Libertad Gran Mamoré	—N/a
2018 II	Deportivo Kivón	Universitario
2019	Real Kateri	Deportivo Kivón
2020	Cancelled due to the COVID-19 pandemic	
2021 I	Libertad Gran Mamoré	Deportivo Kivón
2021 II	Libertad Gran Mamoré	Alianza Beni
2023	Universitario	Germán Busch

== Chuquisaca Football Association Championship ==
Season	Champion	Runner-up
1989	Independiente Petrolero (1)	Fancesa
1990	Universitario (1)	Stormers
1991	Universitario (2)	Fancesa
1992	Universitario (3)	Fancesa
1993	Universitario (4)	Stormers
1994	Universitario (5)	Stormers
1995	Universitario (6)	Real IPTK
1996	Universitario (7)	Fancesa
1997	Fancesa (1)	Junín
1998	Stormers (1)	Juver Sucrense
1999	Fancesa (2)	Guaraní de Sucre
2000	Stormers (2)	Guaraní de Sucre
2001	Guaraní de Sucre (1)	Fancesa
2002	Fancesa (3)	Guaraní de Sucre
2003	Fancesa (4)	Stormers
2004	Universitario (8)	Independiente Petrolero
2005	Universitario (9)	Fancesa
2006	Fancesa (5)	Independiente Petrolero
2007	Fancesa (6)	Independiente Petrolero
2008	Fancesa (7)	Independiente Petrolero
2009	Fancesa (8)	Independiente Petrolero
2010	Independiente Petrolero (2)	Fancesa
2011	Flamengo de Sucre (1)	Guaraní de Sucre
2011–12	Flamengo de Sucre (2)	Fancesa
2012–13	Fancesa (9)	Flamengo de Sucre
2013–14	Fancesa (10)	Stormers
2014–15	Fancesa (11)	Guaraní de Sucre
2015–16	Fancesa (12)	Stormers
2016–17	Atlético Sucre (1)	Flamengo de Sucre
2017	Independiente Petrolero (3)	Deportivo Alemán
2018	Independiente Petrolero (4)	Stormers
2019 I	Independiente Petrolero (5)	Fancesa
2019 II	Independiente Petrolero (6)	Fancesa
2020	Cancelled due to the COVID-19 pandemic	
2021	Universitario (10)	Fancesa
2022	Mojocoya (1)	Stormers
2023	Atlético Sucre (1)	Fancesa

== Cochabamba Football Association Championship ==
Season	Champion	Runner-up
1989	Petrolero (1)	Enrique Happ
1990	Petrolero (2)	Litoral
1991	San Pedro (1)	Enrique Happ
1992	Metalsan (1)	Enrique Happ
1993	Enrique Happ (1)	Universitario
1994	Aurora (1)	Universitario
1995	Aurora (2)	San Pedro
1996	Aurora (3)	Universitario
1997	Aurora (4)	Universitario
1998	Aurora (5)	Enrique Happ
1999	Aurora (6)	Universitario
2000	Aurora (7)	Cala Cala
2001	Aurora (8)	Independiente de Quillacollo
2002	Aurora (9)	Independiente de Quillacollo
2003	Independiente de Quillacollo (1)	Esparta
2004	Independiente de Quillacollo (2)	Esparta
2005	Independiente de Quillacollo (3)	Esparta
2006	Esparta (1)	Aurora
2007	Universitario (1)	Real Cochabamba
2008	Enrique Happ (2)	Nueva Cliza
2009	Universitario (2)	Enrique Happ
2010	Enrique Happ (3)	Bata
2011	Jorge Wilstermann (1)	Enrique Happ
2011–12	Jorge Wilstermann (2)	Universitario
2012–13	Municipal Tiquipaya (1)	Universitario
2013–14	Enrique Happ (4)	Nueva Cliza
2014–15	Aurora (10)	Arauco Prado
2015–16	Municipal Tiquipaya (2)	Aurora
2016–17	Aurora (11)	Enrique Happ
2018	Bata (1)	Enrique Happ
2019 I	Arauco Prado (1)	Atlético Palmaflor
2019 II	Cochabamba FC (1)	Municipal Tiquipaya
2020	Cancelled due to the COVID-19 pandemic	
2021	San Antonio Bulo Bulo (1)	Nueva Cliza
2022	San Antonio Bulo Bulo (2)	Enrique Happ
2023	Pasión Celeste (1)	Municipal Tiquipaya

== La Paz Football Association Championships ==
Ed.	Season	Champion	Runner-up
Amateur era
1	1914	The Strongest (1)	Colegio Militar
2	1915	Colegio Militar (1)	The Strongest
3	1916	The Strongest (2)	Workmen
4	1917	The Strongest (3)	New Fighters
—	1918–1921	No tournament	
5	1922	The Strongest (4)	Universitario
6	1923	The Strongest (5)	Universitario
7	1924	The Strongest (6)	Universitario
8	1925	The Strongest (7)	Universitario
—	1926	No tournament	
9	1927	Nimbles Sport (1)	Bolívar
10	1928	Colegio Militar (2)	Universitario
11	1929	Universitario (1)	The Strongest
12	1930	The Strongest (8)	Bolívar
13	1931	Nimbles Sport (2)	Huracán
14	1932	Bolívar (1)	The Strongest
—	1933–1934	No championship held due to the Chaco War	
15	1935	The Strongest (9)	Ayacucho
16	1936	Ayacucho (1)	San Calixto
17	1937	Bolívar (2)	Atlético Alianza
18	1938	The Strongest (10)	Bolívar
19	1939	Bolívar (3)	Atlético La Paz
20	1940	Bolívar (4)	The Strongest
21	1941	Bolívar (5)	Ferroviario
22	1942	Bolívar (6)	The Strongest
23	1943	The Strongest (11)	Bolívar
24	1944	Ferroviario (1)	The Strongest
25	1945	The Strongest (12)	Bolívar
26	1946	The Strongest (13)	Bolívar
27	1947	Lítoral (1)	Bolívar
28	1948	Lítoral (2)	Unión Maestranza
29	1949	Lítoral (3)	Bolívar
Professional era
30	1950	Bolívar (7)	Litoral
31	1951	Always Ready (1)	Bolívar
32	1952	The Strongest (14)	Always Ready
33	1953	Bolívar (8)	Always Ready
34	1954	Lítoral (4)	The Strongest
35	1955	Chaco Petrolero (1)	Bolívar
36	1956	Bolívar (9)	Deportivo Municipal
37	1957	Always Ready (2)	Deportivo Municipal
38	1958	Deportivo Municipal (1)	The Strongest
39	1959	Always Ready (3)	Bolívar
40	1960	Deportivo Municipal (2)	Bolívar
41	1961	Deportivo Municipal (3)	The Strongest
42	1962	Chaco Petrolero (2)	The Strongest
43	1963	The Strongest (15)	Always Ready
44	1964	The Strongest (16)	Deportivo Municipal
45	1965	Deportivo Municipal (4)	The Strongest
46	1966	Bolívar (10)	31 de Octubre
47	1967	Bolívar (11)	Always Ready
48	1968	Always Ready (4)	Bolívar
49	1969	Bolívar (12)	Deportivo Municipal
50	1970	The Strongest (17)	Deportivo Municipal
51	1971	The Strongest (18)	Deportivo Municipal
52	1972	Lítoral (5)	Deportivo Municipal
53	1973	Deportivo Municipal (5)	31 de Octubre
54	1974	The Strongest (19)	Bolívar
55	1975	31 de Octubre (1)	Always Ready
56	1976	Bolívar (13)	The Strongest
Amateur era
57	1977	31 de Octubre (2)	Litoral
58	1978	31 de Octubre (3)	1 de Mayo
—	1979	No tournament	
59	1980	Unión Maestranza (1)	Chaco Petrolero
60	1981	Chaco Petrolero (3)	Unión Maestranza
61	1982	Mariscal Braun (1)	Lítoral
62	1983	Lítoral (6)	Unión Maestranza
—	1984–1985	No tournament	
63	1986	Always Ready (5)	Deportivo Municipal
64	1987	Chaco Petrolero (4)	Independiente Alas
65	1988	Mariscal Braun (2)	Chaco Petrolero
66	1989	Chaco Petrolero (5)	Unión Maestranza
67	1990	Chaco Petrolero (6)	Mariscal Braun
68	1991	Litoral (7)	Mariscal Braun
69	1992	Chaco Petrolero (7)	Mariscal Braun
70	1993	Always Ready (6)	Mariscal Braun
71	1994	Chaco Petrolero (8)	Always Ready
72	1995	Chaco Petrolero (9)	Deportivo Municipal
73	1996	La Paz (1)	Mariscal Braun
74	1997	La Paz (2)	Mariscal Santa Cruz
75	1998	Deportivo Municipal (6)	Mariscal Braun
76	1999	Mariscal Braun (3)	Litoral
77	2000	Iberoamericana (1)	Atlético González
78	2001	Litoral (8)	Chaco Petrolero
79	2002	La Paz (3)	Deportivo Zuraca
80	2003	La Paz (4)	Mariscal Braun
81	2004	Deportivo Zuraca (1)	ABB
82	2005	Mariscal Braun (4)	ABB
83	2006	Mariscal Braun (5)	Chaco Petrolero
84	2007	Mariscal Braun (6)	Ferroviario
85	2008	ABB (1)	Fraternidad Tigres
86	2009	Fraternidad Tigres (1)	31 de Octubre
87	2010	Mariscal Braun (7)	ABB
88	2011	ABB (2)	Unión Maestranza
89	2011–12	Unión Maestranza (2)	ABB
90	2012–13	Unión Maestranza (3)	31 de Octubre
91	2013–14	Unión Maestranza (4)	Ramiro Castillo
92	2014–15	Unión Maestranza (5)	Ramiro Castillo
93	2015–16	Ramiro Castillo (1)	Always Ready
94	2016–17	Ramiro Castillo (2)	Always Ready
95	2017–18	Always Ready (7)	Deportivo FATIC
96	2018–19	Deportivo FATIC (1)	Virgen de Chijipata
97	2020	Deportivo FATIC (2)	Chaco Petrolero
98	2021	Deportivo FATIC (3)	Unión Maestranza
99	2022	Deportivo FATIC (4)	Chaco Petrolero
100	2023	Deportivo FATIC (5)	Hiska Nacional

== Oruro Football Association Championship ==
Season	Champion	Runner-up
1989	Estudiantes Frontanilla	Ferroviario
1990	Estudiantes Frontanilla	Ferroviario
1991	Estudiantes Frontanilla	ENAF
1992	Estudiantes Frontanilla	MAFAL
1993	Estudiantes Frontanilla	Ingenieros
1994	Ingenieros	Estudiantes Frontanilla
1995	Oruro Royal	Estudiantes Frontanilla
1996	Ingenieros	Estudiantes Frontanilla
1997	Estudiantes Frontanilla	Atlético La Joya
1998	Estudiantes Frontanilla	Ingenieros
1999	Oruro Royal	Ingenieros
2000	San José	Ingenieros
2001	San José	Ingenieros
2002	Ingenieros	Atlético La Joya
2003	Ingenieros	Oruro Royal
2004	Ingenieros	Atlético La Joya
2005	Atlético La Joya	Deportivo Huachacalla
2006	Deportivo Cristal	Oruro Royal
2007	Deportivo Cristal	Deportivo Huachacalla
2008	Deportivo Cristal	Ingenieros
2009	Deportivo Cristal	Oruro Royal
2010	31 de Octubre	Oruro Royal
2011	Oruro Royal	Huanuni
2011–12	Oruro Royal	Huanuni
2012–13	Huanuni	Oruro Royal
2013–14	Oruro Royal	Huanuni
2014–15	Huanuni	Oruro Royal
2015–16	Deportivo Escara	Deportivo Kala
2016	Deportivo Kala	Deportivo Escara
2017	Huanuni	Sur-Car
2018	Huanuni	Deportivo Escara
2019	Huanuni	Sur-Car
2020	Cancelled due to the COVID-19 pandemic	
2021	Deportivo Shalon	Huanuni
2022	Huanuni	CDT Real Oruro
2023	CDT Real Oruro	Sur-Car

== Pando Football Association Championship ==
Season	Champion	Runner-up
1997	Unión Comercio	—N/a
1998	Cobija	Vaca Díez
1999	Cobija	Porvenir
2000	Cobija	Antequera
2001	Cobija	Veracruz
2002	Cobija	Oriente Agropecuario
2003	Oriente Agropecuario	Cobija
2004	Cobija	Vaca Díez
2005	Vaca Díez	Deportivo Paraíso
2006	Vaca Díez	27 de Mayo
2007	Vaca Díez	Miraflores
2008	Miraflores	Vaca Díez
2009	Vaca Díez	Universitario
2010	Vaca Díez	Universitario
2011	Vaca Díez	Miraflores
2011–12	Vaca Díez	Real Vaca Díez
2012–13	Universitario	Vaca Díez
2013–14	Real Mapajo	Miraflores
2014–15	Mariscal Sucre	Real Mapajo
2015–16	Miraflores	Mariscal Sucre
2016–17	Gatty Ribeiro	Vaca Díez
2018	Gatty Ribeiro	Mariscal Sucre
2019 I	Mariscal Sucre	Vaca Díez
2019 II	Vaca Díez	Mariscal Sucre
2020	Cancelled due to the COVID-19 pandemic	
2021	Mariscal Sucre	Vaca Díez
2022	Mariscal Sucre	Vaca Díez
2023	Moto Club	Real Mapajo

== Potosí Football Association Championship ==
Season	Champion	Runner-up
1989	Independiente Unificada	Real Potosí
1990	Real Potosí	Municipal
1991	Real Potosí	Real SENAC
1992	Independiente Unificada	Municipal
1993	Municipal	Real SENAC
1994	Municipal	—N/a
1995	Real Potosí	Alianza Litoral
1996	Real Potosí	Municipal
1997	Real Potosí	Municipal
1998	Municipal	Real Villazón
1999	Municipal	Universitario
2000	Municipal	Nacional Potosí
2001	Municipal	Universitario
2002	Nacional Potosí	1º de Mayo
2003	Universitario	Nacional Potosí
2004	Nacional Potosí	Universitario
2005	Universitario	Stormers San Lorenzo
2006	Nacional Potosí	Municipal
2007	Nacional Potosí	Universitario
2008	Nacional Potosí	Stormers San Lorenzo
2009	Stormers San Lorenzo	Universitario
2010	Nacional Potosí	Universitario
2011	Stormers San Lorenzo	Universitario
2011–12	Wilstermann Cooperativas	Atlético Nacional Emilio Alave
2012–13	Atlético Nacional Emilio Alave	Wilstermann Cooperativas
2013–14	Wilstermann Cooperativas	Atlético Nacional Emilio Alave
2014–15	Wilstermann Cooperativas	Interfi
2015–16	Rosario Central	Wilstermann Cooperativas
2016–17	Wilstermann Cooperativas	Stormers San Lorenzo
2018	Ferrocarril Palmeiras	Rosario Central
2019	Stormers San Lorenzo	Wilstermann Cooperativas
2020	Cancelled due to the COVID-19 pandemic	
2021	Rosario Central	Ferrocarril Palmeiras
2021–22	Wilstermann Cooperativas	Deportivo JUVA
2023	Real Potosí	Wilstermann Cooperativas

== Santa Cruz Football Association Championship ==
Season	Champion	Runner-up
1989	Universidad Cruceña	Grigotá
1990	Universidad Cruceña	Guabirá
1991	Universidad Cruceña	Guabirá
1992	Guabirá	Municipal Braniff
1993	Real Santa Cruz	Florida
1994	Cooper	Libertad
1995	Universidad Cruceña	Municipal Braniff
1996	Blooming	Universidad Cruceña
1997	Municipal Braniff	Universidad Cruceña
1998	Libertad	Municipal Braniff
1999	Municipal Braniff	Cooper
2000	Cooper	Destroyers
2001	Universidad Cruceña	Libertad
2002	Libertad	Real Santa Cruz
2003	Destroyers	Real Santa Cruz
2004	Universidad Cruceña	Destroyers
2005	Guabirá	Universidad Cruceña
2006	Universidad Cruceña	Guabirá
2007	Real Santa Cruz	Guabirá
2008	Universidad Cruceña	Real Santa Cruz
2009	Guabirá	Destroyers
2010	Real América	Callejas
2011	Universidad Cruceña	Real Santa Cruz
2011–12	Real Santa Cruz	Sport Boys Warnes
2012–13	Universidad Cruceña	Destroyers
2013–14	Destroyers	El Torno
2014–15	Guabirá	Royal Pari
2015–16	Real América	Destroyers
2016–17	Destroyers	Royal Pari
2018	Real Santa Cruz	Universidad Cruceña
2019 I	Torre Fuerte	Universidad Cruceña
2019 II	Real Santa Cruz	Ferroviario
2020	Cancelled due to the COVID-19 pandemic	
2021 I	Argentinos Juniors	Torre Fuerte
2021 II	Destroyers	Argentinos Juniors
2023	Ciudad Nueva Santa Cruz	Nueva Santa Cruz

== Tarija Football Association Championship ==
Season	Champion	Runner-up
1989	Independiente	Litoral
1990	Royal Obrero	Deportivo Municipal
1991	Universitario	Petrolero
1992	Petrolero	Unión Tarija
1993	Independiente	Litoral
1994	Independiente	Unión Tarija
1995	Independiente	Nacional Senac
1996	Deportivo Municipal	Independiente
1997	Unión Tarija	Ciclón
1998	Ciclón	Unión Tarija
1999	Ciclón	Universitario
2000	Ciclón	Universitario
2001	Universitario	Ciclón
2002	Atlético Bermejo	Entel
2003	Universitario	Royal Obrero
2004	Atlético Bermejo	Entel
2005	Entel	Royal Obrero
2006	Ciclón	Universitario
2007	Unión Tarija	Ciclón
2008	Petrolero	Ciclón
2009	Ciclón	Petrolero
2010	Ciclón	García Agreda
2011	Petrolero	García Agreda
2011–12	García Agreda	Petrolero
2012–13	Ciclón	García Agreda
2013–14	Ciclón	Atlético Bermejo
2014–15	Ciclón	García Agreda
2015–16	Atlético Bermejo	García Agreda
2016–17	Atlético Bermejo	Ciclón
2017 II	Atlético Bermejo	Ciclón
2018 I	Atlético Bermejo	Petrolero
2018 II	Nacional Senac	Atlético Bermejo
2019 I	Real Tomayapo	Nacional Senac
2019 II	Atlético Bermejo	Real Tomayapo
2020	Cancelled due to the COVID-19 pandemic	
2021 I	García Agreda	Atlético Bermejo
2021 II	Ciclón	Nacional Senac
2022	Atlético Bermejo	García Agreda
2023	Deportivo Municipal	Pumas Chapacos

== Yacuiba Football Association Championship ==
Season	Champion	Runner-up
2016	Juventud Unida	Independiente
2017	Independiente	Deportivo El Palmar
2018	Juventud Unida	Independiente
2019	Independiente	Juventud Unida
2022	Olimpia del Chaco Petrolero	Deportivo El Palmar
2023	Municipalidad de Yacuiba	Olimpia del Chaco Petrolero
