= Estadio Jesús Bermúdez =

Bolivian multi purpose stadium

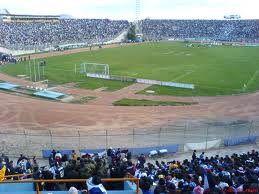
- Interactive map of Estadio Jesús Bermúdez
- Address: 3V3Q+F9R, Avenida Segundo Encinas
- Location: Oruro, Bolivia
- Coordinates: 17°56′46″S 67°6′42″W
- Elevation: 3,715 m (12,189 ft)
- Capacity: 33,000

Construction
- Opened: 1955

Tenants
- GV San José; Club San José

The Estadio Jesús Bermúdez is a multi-purpose stadium in Oruro, Bolivia. It is currently used mostly for football matches and athletics. The stadium has a capacity of 33,000 people, and is the home stadium of GV San José of the Bolivian Primera División and Club San José. It is located at 3,715 meters (12,189 feet) above sea level.

== History ==
The stadium was opened in 1955. It is named after Jesús Bermúdez, the first goalkeeper of the Bolivia national team. The stadium hosted two games in the 1975 Copa América and the third place match of the 1997 Copa América.

On February 20, 2013, a 14-year-old Club San José fan, Kevin Beltrán Spada, was killed during a 2013 Copa Libertadores match against Corinthians at the stadium after being hit in the face by a flare launched by a 17-year-old Corinthians fan, who was later sentenced to community service in Brazil.

An investigation concluded that he died after a plastic tubular flare landed directly in his eye and “penetrated his skull”, killing him instantly. CONMEBOL initially ruled that Corinthians would play behind closed doors for the next 60 days as a result of the incident, but later reduced the ban to one home match, a $200,000 fine, and no Corinthians fans at away games for 18 months.
