= Universitario de Pando =

Bolivian football club

- Full name: Club Universitario de Pando
- Nickname(s): Jaguares Pandinos
- Founded: 9 March 1995; 30 years ago
- Ground: Roberto Jordán Cuéllar
- Capacity: 24,000
- Chairman: Ludwing Arciénega
- League: Copa Simón Bolívar; Primera A AFP
- 2023 2023: Copa Simón Bolívar, 14th of 40; Primera A AFP, 3rd of 9
Home colours	Away colours

Club Universitario de Pando is a professional football team based in Pando Department, Bolivia that competes in the Bolivian Primera División.
