= Estadio Ramón Tahuichi Aguilera =

Stadium in Santa Cruz, Bolivia

Coordinates: 17.7961°S 63.1839°W

Ramón Tauichi Aguilera Stadium
- El Tahuichi
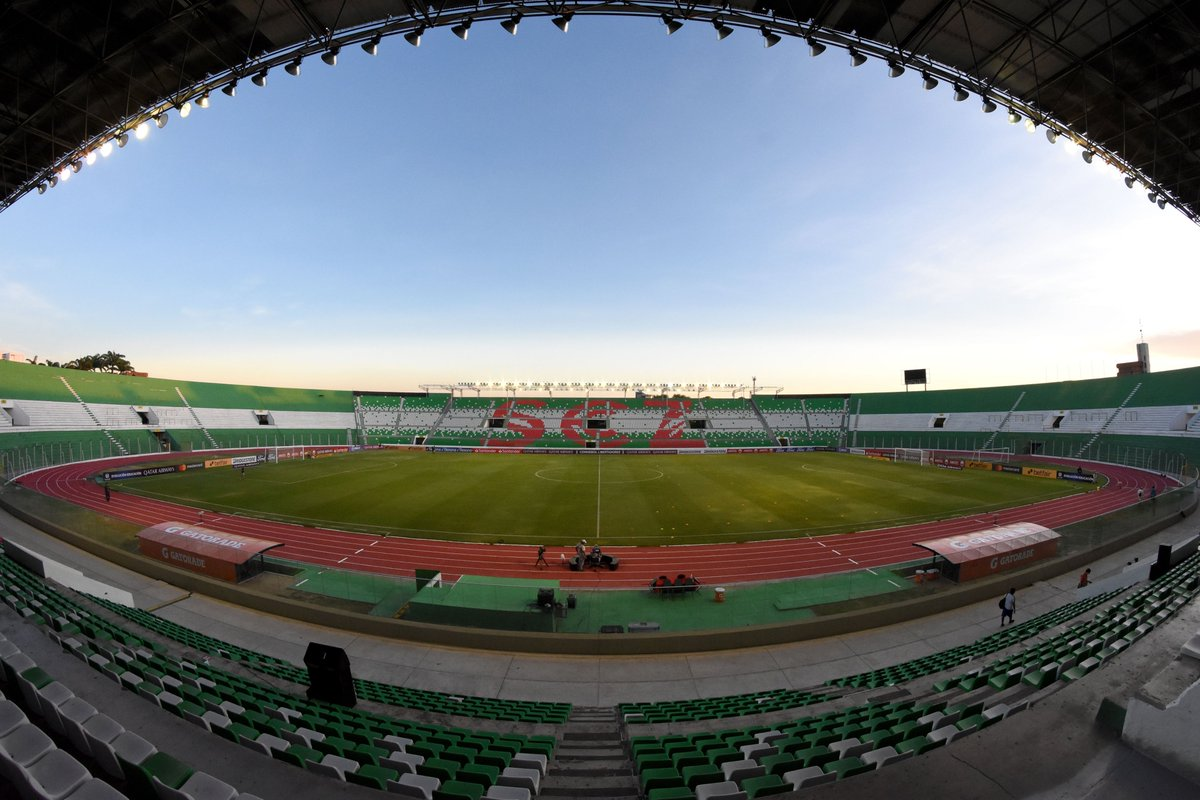
- Interactive map of Ramón Tauichi Aguilera Stadium
- Full name: Ramon Tahuichi Aguilera Costas Stadium
- Former names: Estadio William Bendeck (1972–1980); Estadio Departamental de Santa Cruz (1940–1972)
- Location: Avenida San Aurelio; Santa Cruz de la Sierra, Bolivia
- Elevation: 421 m (1,381 ft)
- Owner: Santa Cruz Department
- Capacity: 31,400 (international)
- Surface: Grass
- Field size: 105 x 64.7 m

Construction
- Groundbreaking: 28 January 1938
- Built: 1938–1940
- Opened: 25 May 1940
- Renovated: 1995–1996; 2014–2020

Tenants
- Oriente Petrolero; Blooming; Destroyers; Royal Pari; Universidad Cruceña

Ramón "Tahuichi" Aguilera Costas Stadium is a multi-purpose stadium in Santa Cruz, Bolivia. It is used mostly for football matches, on club level by Blooming, Oriente Petrolero, Destroyers, and Royal Pari. Inaugurated in 1940, the stadium has a capacity of 31,400 people and was one of the official stadiums for the 1997 Copa America.

Organized by the Tahuichi Academy, every year during January this stadium hosts one of the greatest youth football tournaments in the world, the "Mundialito Paz y Unidad." Past participants of the U-15 tournament have included Real Madrid, Benfica, Vasco da Gama, River Plate, Colo-Colo and many youth national teams.

== History ==
=== Name changes ===
At first it was named Estadio Departamental de Santa Cruz, then in 1972 following the death of auto racing legend Willy Bendeck in a local competition, the decision to name the departamental stadium after Willy Bendeck was finalized.

In 1979 the Tahuichi Aguilera football academy was invited to an international U-15 soccer tournament held in Mar del Plata, Argentina. The team came to be crowned tournament champion, which created a decision to rename the stadium in recognition of the founder of the Tahuichi Academy (Ramón "Tahuichi" Aguilera Costas), to be called Estadio Tahuichi Aguilera, a name it bears today.

=== Renovations ===
In late 2014, the stadium began a renovation that cost approximately 77 million BOL. The first phase of the project includes new bathrooms, a subterranean parking lot, new changing rooms, security cameras, renovated suites, and renovated press cabins. Phase One was completed in 2016.

Phase Two consists of new lighting, new parking garage, referee locker rooms and doping rooms.

The third phase was completed in late 2019, and the renovations were fully completed in February 2021. The last phase included the installation of 14,300 seats.

==== Stripping of 2025 Copa Sudamericana final ====
The stadium had originally been designated to host the final match of the 2025 Copa Sudamericana. However, by September 2025, following a series of technical assessments on the degree of completion of the ongoing reconstruction progress conducted by CONMEBOL's inspection commissions, the venue was found to be non-compliant with infrastructure regulatory standards for hosting such a fixture. CONMEBOL formally rescinded the stadium's hosting rights on 11 September 2025. In accordance with the procedural framework, the final was subsequently reassigned to Asunción, Paraguay which had served as the host city for the previous year's final.

=== Notable Concerts ===
- Shakira: March 11, 1997 - Pies Descalzos Tour
- Floricienta: October 8, 2005
- Wisin & Yandel: January 18, 2007 - Pa'l Mundo Tour
- Daddy Yankee: December 1, 2007 - The Big Boss Tour
- RBD: April 19, 2008 - Empezar Desde Cero World Tour
- Wisin & Yandel: January 14, 2009 - Los Extraterrestres World Tour
- Los Fabulosos Cadillacs: April 30, 2009 - Satánico Pop Tour
- Daddy Yankee: August 9, 2009 - Talento de Barrio Tour
- David Guetta - November 16, 2010
- Luis Miguel: December 8, 2010 - Luis Miguel Tour
- Shakira: March 21, 2011 - The Sun Comes Out World Tour
- Enrique Iglesias: July 5, 2011 - Euphoria Tour
- Scorpions - September 12, 2012 - Final Sting World Tour
- Silvio Rodríguez: April 15, 2013
- Alejandra Guzmán: May 31, 2014 - La Guzmán Primera Fila Tour
- Romeo Santos: April 16, 2015 - Vol. 2 Tour
- Violetta: June 13, 2015 - Violetta Live
- Ricky Martin: November 5, 2016 - One World Tour
- Maná: February 24, 2017 - Cama Incendiada Tour
- J Balvin: August 5, 2017 - Energía Tour
- Juanes: August 6, 2017 - Bolivia 360 Music Festival

== Notable matches ==
=== 1997 Copa América ===
June 13, 1997

Brazil	5–0	Costa Rica
Djalminha 20'; González 34' (o.g.); Ronaldo 47', 54'; Romário 60'

Estadio Ramón Aguilera, Santa Cruz
Referee: Epifanio González (Paraguay)

June 13, 1997

Colombia	1–2	Mexico
Ricard 58'		Hernández 7', 11'

Estadio Ramón Aguilera, Santa Cruz
Referee: Horacio Elizondo (Argentina)

June 16, 1997

Brazil	3–2	Mexico
Aldair 47'; Romero 59' (o.g.); Leonardo 77'		Hernández 13', 31'

Estadio Ramón Aguilera, Santa Cruz
Referee: José Arana (Peru)

June 16, 1997

Colombia	4–1	Costa Rica
Morantes 13', 23'; Cabrera 62' (pen.); Aristizábal 78'		Wright 66'

Estadio Ramón Aguilera, Santa Cruz
Referee: Esfandiar Baharmast (United States)

June 19, 1997

Brazil	2–0	Colombia
Dunga 11'; Edmundo 67'

Estadio Ramón Aguilera, Santa Cruz
Referee: Juan Carlos Paniagua (Bolivia)

June 19, 1997

Mexico	1–1	Costa Rica
Hernández 14' (pen.)		Medford 60'

Estadio Ramón Aguilera, Santa Cruz
Referee: Epifanio González (Paraguay)

Preceded by Estadio General Pablo Rojas; Asunción	Copa Sudamericana; Final Venue; 2025	Succeeded by TBD
