= Club Stormers San Lorenzo =

Bolivian football club

Stormers San Lorenzo
- Full name: Club Stormers San Lorenzo
- Nickname: Los Pumas del Norte
- Founded: 26 May 1897; 128 years ago
- Ground: Estadio Serafín Ferreira; Llallagua, Bolivia
- Capacity: 20 ,000
- Manager: Ilderin Mendoza
- League: Copa Simón Bolívar; Primera A AFP
- 2023 2023: Copa Simón Bolívar, 18th of 40; Primera A AFP, 3rd of 11
Home colours	Away colours

The Stormers San Lorenzo de Llallagua are a Bolivian football club that plays in the Primera A division of the Potosí Football Association (AFP). Founded on 26 May 1897, it is the oldest football club from Potosí in the AFP. It plays its home games at the Estadio Serafín Ferreira.
