= Club Calleja =

Bolivian football club

- Full name: Club Calleja de Santa Cruz
- Nickname(s): Los Blancos
- Founded: 1966
- Ground: Estadio Ramón Tahuichi Aguilera; Santa Cruz, Bolivia
- Capacity: 38,000
- President: (Bolivia) Roly Aguilera Gasser
- League: Primera B ACF
- 2023: Primera B ACF, 7th of 10

Club Calleja is a football club from Santa Cruz, Bolivia currently playing at Santa Cruz Primera A, one of the first division regional leagues. The club is the senior team of Tahuichi. They play their home games at the Estadio Ramón Tahuichi Aguilera. Calleja has never competed in the Liga de Fútbol Profesional Boliviano.
