= Club Deportivo FATIC =

Bolivian football club

Deportivo FATIC
- Full name: Club Deportivo Familia Ticona
- Nickname: Auriazules
- Founded: 2015; 11 years ago
- Ground: Municipal; El Alto, Bolivia
- Capacity: 25,000
- Chairman: Freddy Ticona
- Manager: Sergio Apaza
- League: Copa Simón Bolívar; Primera A AFLP
- 2023 2023: Copa Simón Bolívar, 12th of 40; Primera A AFLP, 1st of 14
Home colours	Away colours

Club Deportivo Familia Ticona, known as Deportivo FATIC, is a professional football club based in El Alto, Bolivia.

== History ==
Club Familia Ticona was founded on 25 March 2000, and played mainly in local tournaments. In 2015, the club's owners acquired the license of Fraternidad Tigres (founded in 1967), and merged both clubs into Fraternidad Tigres FATIC. In 2016, the club changed name to Club Deportivo FATIC.
