= Enrique Happ =

Bolivian football club

- Full name: Club Deportivo Enrique Happ del Trópico
- Nickname(s): Los del Valle
- Founded: 24 September 1960; 64 years ago
- Ground: Estadio Félix Capriles; Cochabamba, Bolivia
- Capacity: 38,000
- Chairman: Yoel González Carvajal
- Manager: Roberto Prada Botelho
- League: Copa Simón Bolívar; Primera A AFC
- 2023 2023: Copa Simón Bolívar, 28th of 40; Primera A AFC, 3rd of 20
Home colours	Away colours	Third colours

Club Deportivo Enrique Happ del Trópico is a football club from Cochabamba, Bolivia currently playing at Cochabamba Primera A, one of the first division regional leagues. They play their home games at the Estadio Félix Capriles. Happ has won Primera A three consecutive years. In 2010 the club participated in Copa Simon Bolivar, but they were eliminated at the second stage.
