= Oruro Royal =

Bolivian football club

Oruro Royal Club
- Full name: Oruro Royal Club
- Nickname: "El Decano"
- Founded: 26 May 1896
- Ground: Estadio Jesús Bermúdez; Oruro, Bolivia
- Capacity: 28,000
- Chairman: Ivar Cortez
- Manager: Dionisio Gutiérrez
- League: Copa Simón Bolívar; Primera A AFO
- 2023: Primera A AFO, 3rd of 12
Home colours	Away colours	Third colours

Oruro Royal Club is the oldest Bolivian football club from Oruro. The club plays in the Oruro Primera A, one of the third-division regional leagues. Oruro Royal was founded on 26 May 1896 by the English workers hired by the Bolivian Government to build the national railways, becoming the first Bolivian football squad. It plays its home games at the Estadio Jesús Bermúdez.
