= Club Destroyers =

Bolivian football club

- Full name: Club Deportivo y Cultural Destroyer's
- Nickname(s): El Canario (The Canary); La Máquina Vieja (The Old Machine); Destructor (Destroyer); Tractor Amarillo (Yellow Tractor)
- Founded: 14 September 1948; 76 years ago
- Ground: Estadio Ramón Tahuichi Aguilera; Santa Cruz, Bolivia
- Capacity: 38,000
- President: Jesus Bermúdez
- Manager: Francisco Muñoz
- League: Copa Simón Bolívar; Primera A ACF
- 2023: Primera A ACF, 5th of 15
Home colours	Away colours

Club Destroyers is a football club from Santa Cruz, Bolivia which plays in the second division Copa Simón Bolívar. The club was founded September 14, 1948, and they play their home games at the Estadio Ramón Tahuichi Aguilera. Destroyers competed in the top-flight Liga de Fútbol Profesional Boliviano from 1985–99 and 2005–07, and played in the first two seasons of the top-flight Division Profesional from 2018 to 2019.

The club won its first professional title when they won the Second Division in 2004.

== Achievements ==
=== National honours ===
- First Division – Professional Era: 0
- First Division – Semiprofessional Era: 2

1965, 1966

- Second Division, Copa Simón Bolívar: 1

2004
Runners-up: 2012, 2016–17

== Current squad ==
As of 22 August 2019

Note: Flags indicate national team as defined under FIFA eligibility rules; some limited exceptions apply. Players may hold more than one non-FIFA nationality.

No.	Pos.	Nation	Player
1	GK	(Bolivia) BOL	Elder Arauz
3	MF	(Brazil) BRA	Júnior Gaúcho
6	MF	(Bolivia) BOL	José Méndez
7	DF	(Bolivia) BOL	Diego Paz
8	MF	(Bolivia) BOL	Roly Sejas
9	FW	(Brazil) BRA	Willian Lira
11	FW	(Colombia) COL	José Ricardo Cortés
12	GK	(Bolivia) BOL	Carlos Andrés Suárez
13	DF	(Bolivia) BOL	Widen Saucedo
15	MF	(Bolivia) BOL	José Rodríguez
16	MF	(Bolivia) BOL	Jaime Arandía

No.	Pos.	Nation	Player
17	MF	(Venezuela) VEN	Rodderyck Perozo
18	FW	(Bolivia) BOL	Matías Aguirre
19	FW	(Bolivia) BOL	Brhyan Vaca
20	MF	(Bolivia) BOL	Victor Abrego
24	MF	(Bolivia) BOL	Marcelo Villagomez
25	DF	(Bolivia) BOL	Jorge Ayala
27	DF	(Bolivia) BOL	Erwin Melgar
33	MF	(Bolivia) BOL	Denilson Guzmán
38	MF	(Brazil) BRA	Galiardo
39	DF	(Bolivia) BOL	Lorgio Álvarez
41	MF	(Bolivia) BOL	Jheysson Campos
