= Club Independiente Petrolero =

Bolivian football club

Independiente Petrolero
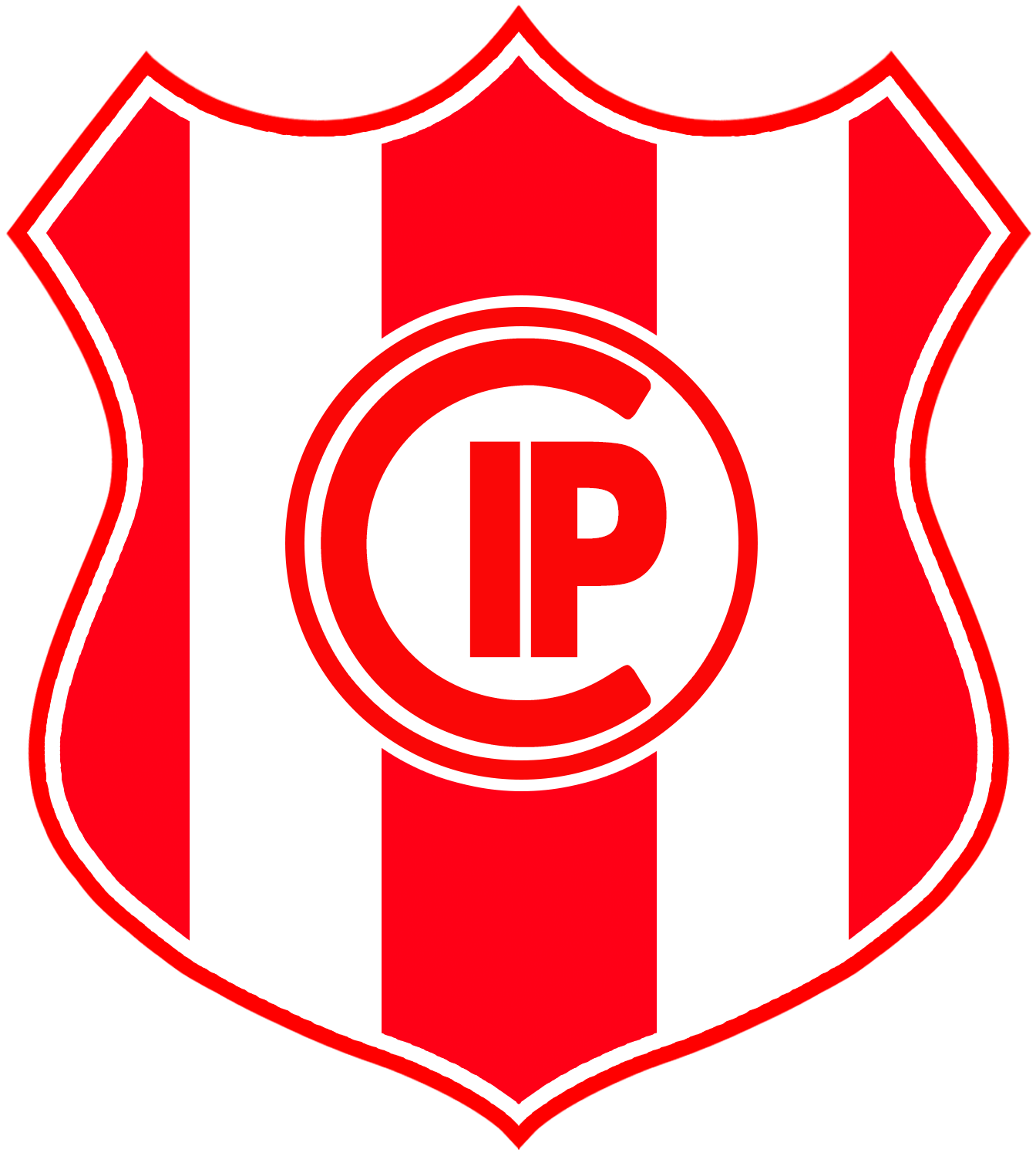
- Full name: Club Independiente Petrolero
- Nicknames: El Inde; Los Refineros
- Founded: April 4, 1932; 94 years ago
- Ground: Estadio Olímpico Patria
- Capacity: 32,000
- Chairman: Jenny Montaño
- Manager: Thiago Leitão
- League: División Profesional
- 2025: División Profesional, 6th of 16
Home colours	Away colours	Third colours

Club Independiente Petrolero is a professional football club from Sucre, Bolivia, currently competing in the FBF División Profesional, the top-tier football league in Bolivia. The club was founded on April 4, 1932 and plays its home games at the Estadio Olímpico Patria. The team had two spells in the old Liga de Fútbol Profesional Boliviano. The first one lasted from 1981 to 1983 and the second one from 1990 to 2003. Since 2021 they have competed in the División Profesional.

== Honours ==
=== National ===
- Bolivian Primera División
  - Winners (1): 2021

=== Regional ===
- Primera "A" (ACHF)
  - Winners (6): 1989, 2010, 2017-18, 2018-19, Apertura 2019, Clausura 2019
- Primera "B"
  - Winners (1): 2014

== Players ==
=== First-team squad ===
As of 17 July 2026

Note: Flags indicate national team as defined under FIFA eligibility rules; some limited exceptions apply. Players may hold more than one non-FIFA nationality.

No.	Pos.	Nation	Player
1	GK	BOL	Jhohan Gutiérrez
2	DF	BOL	Saúl Torres
4	DF	BOL	Francisco Rodríguez
5	DF	PAR	Luis Palma
6	MF	BOL	Daniel Rojas
7	MF	BOL	Rudy Cardozo
8	MF	BOL	Marcelo Somoya
—	FW	BRA	Gean
10	MF	BRA	Thomaz
11	FW	BRA	Rafael Lutkowski
12	GK	BOL	Jhunior Vera
13	DF	BOL	Leonardo Montenegro
14	MF	BOL	Cristian Urdininea
16	DF	BOL	Ronny Montero
19	MF	PAR	Gustavo Cristaldo

No.	Pos.	Nation	Player
20	MF	BOL	Alan Mercado
23	FW	COL	Rodrigo Rivas
26	MF	BOL	Kent Sánchez
27	MF	BOL	Diego Navarro
—	DF	BOL	Lázaro Crescencio
35	DF	BOL	Dalmiro Chuipa
39	MF	BOL	Pablo Grass
50	MF	BOL	Diego Vargas
59	FW	BOL	Roberto Villavicencio
68	DF	BOL	David Morales
77	DF	BOL	Rodrigo Zamora
82	FW	BOL	Deyvid Sejas
90	DF	BOL	Stiven Vargas
93	MF	BRA	Willie
99	FW	BRA	Wagner Pinote

== Performance in CONMEBOL competitions ==
- Copa Libertadores: 1 appearance

2022 – Group stage

- Copa Sudamericana: 1 appearance

2026 – Group stage

- Copa CONMEBOL: 1 appearance

1999 – First round
