= Víctor Ugarte =

Bolivian footballer (1926–1995)

Personal information
- Full name: Víctor Agustín Ugarte Oviedo
- Date of birth: 5 May 1926
- Place of birth: Tupiza, Bolivia
- Date of death: 20 March 1995 (aged 68)
- Place of death: La Paz, Bolivia
- Position: Striker

Senior career*
Years	Team	Apps	(Gls)
1947–1964	Bolívar	318	(52)
1958	San Lorenzo	3	(1)
1961–1962	Once Caldas	26	(9)
1965	Deportivo Municipal		
1966	Mariscal Santa Cruz		

International career
1947–1963	Bolivia	45	(16)
- * Club domestic league appearances and goals as of April 2008

Víctor Agustín Ugarte Oviedo (5 May 1926 – 20 March 1995) was a Bolivian footballer. He scored 16 goals in 45 caps for Bolivia, making him their third all-time top goalscorer behind Joaquín Botero and Marcelo Moreno. His national team career lasted from 1947 to 1963, and he played for the Bolivian team that won the 1963 Copa América, where he scored two goals in Bolivia's final match of the tournament against Brazil.

Ugarte spent most of his career with Club Bolívar but he had a short spell with Argentine club San Lorenzo in 1958 where he was the first Bolivian to play in the Argentine Primera. He also played for Once Caldas in Colombia.

Ugarte retired from football in 1966. In his last years he suffered from poverty and illness, which contributed to his death on March 20, 1995, aged 68. The Victor Agustín Ugarte stadium in Potosí is named in his honour.

== International goals ==
#	Date	Venue	Opponent	Score	Result	Competition
1.	6 April 1949	Estádio do Pacaembu, São Paulo, Brazil	Chile	1–1	3–2	1949 Copa América
2.	10 April 1949	Estádio do Pacaembu, São Paulo, Brazil	Brazil	1–6	1–10	1949 Copa América
3.	17 April 1949	Estádio São Januário, Rio de Janeiro, Brazil	Uruguay	1–0	3–2	1949 Copa América
4.	24 April 1949	Estádio do Pacaembu, São Paulo, Brazil	Ecuador	1–0	2–0	1949 Copa América
5.	24 April 1949	Estádio do Pacaembu, São Paulo, Brazil	Ecuador	2–0	2–0	1949 Copa América
6.	6 May 1949	Estádio General Severiano, Rio de Janeiro, Brazil	Colombia	4–0	4–0	1949 Copa América
7.	22 February 1953	Estadio Nacional, Lima, Peru	Peru	1–0	1–0	1953 Copa América
8.	1 March 1953	Estadio Nacional, Lima, Peru	Brazil	1–8	1–8	1953 Copa América
9.	8 March 1953	Estadio Nacional, Lima, Peru	Ecuador	1–1	1–1	1953 Copa América
10.	10 June 1957	Estadio Defensores del Chaco, Asunción, Paraguay	Paraguay	2–4	2–5	1957 Copa Paz del Chaco
11.	13 June 1957	Estadio Defensores del Chaco, Asunción, Paraguay	Paraguay	1–0	1–0	1957 Copa Paz del Chaco
12.	18 August 1957	Estadio Hernando Siles, La Paz, Bolivia	Paraguay	1–2	3–3	1957 Copa Paz del Chaco
13.	21 August 1957	Estadio Hernando Siles, La Paz, Bolivia	Paraguay	2–1	2–1	1957 Copa Paz del Chaco
14.	19 February 1963	Estadio Defensores del Chaco, Asunción, Paraguay	Paraguay	1–3	1–5	1963 Copa Paz del Chaco
15.	31 March 1963	Estadio Félix Capriles, Cochabamba, Bolivia	Brazil	1–0	5–4	1963 Copa América
16.	31 March 1963	Estadio Félix Capriles, Cochabamba, Bolivia	Brazil	3–2	5–4	1963 Copa América

== Honours ==
Club Bolívar

- Bolivian Primera División: 1950, 1953, 1956
- Primera A AFLP: 1950, 1953, 1956

Mariscal Santa Cruz

- Segunda División de La Paz: 1966

Bolivia

- Copa América: 1963
