= FBF División Profesional =

Professional association football league in Bolivia

División Profesional de Fútbol Boliviano
- Founded: 1950; 76 years ago
- Country: Bolivia
- Confederation: CONMEBOL
- Number of clubs: 16
- Level on pyramid: 1
- Relegation to: Copa Simón Bolívar
- Domestic cup(s): Copa Bolivia; Copa de la División Profesional
- International cup(s): Copa Libertadores; Copa Sudamericana
- Current champions: Always Ready (4th title) (2025)
- Most championships: Bolívar (31 titles)
- Most appearances: Joselito Vaca (653 caps)
- Top scorer: Victor Hugo Antelo (350 goals)
- Broadcaster: FútbolCanal
- Website: fbf.com.bo
- Current: 2026 season

The División Profesional de Fútbol Boliviano is the top-flight professional football league in Bolivia. In 2017, the Liga de Fútbol Profesional Boliviano (Spanish pronunciation: [ˈliɣa ðe ˈfuðβol pɾofesjoˈnal βoliˈβjano]; English: Bolivian Professional Football League) was disbanded and the FBF became responsible for the organisation of the league.

Since 1950, a total of 16 clubs have been crowned champions of the Bolivian football league system. The current champions are Always Ready, who won the title in the 2025 tournament. Bolívar is the most successful club in the league, with 31 titles to date.

== History ==
The organisation of football in Bolivia started in 1914 with the creation of regional associations and their respective competitions. The "La Paz Football Association (AFLP)" (Asociación de Fútbol de La Paz – AFLP) was the first organised body with 29 championships held between 1914 and 1949. The AFLP was considered for many years the top football tournament in the country. In 1950 the body modified its statutes allowing the professionalisation of the sport in Bolivia, so the "Torneo Profesional" was created.

Between 1950 and 1959, only clubs from La Paz, Oruro (since 1954) and Cochabamba (1955) took part of the championship because football was still amateur in the rest of the regions.

At the end of 1960, the Bolivian Football Federation established a national championship, with the purpose of crowning a champion representing Bolivia in recently created Copa Libertadores. The competition, named "Copa Simón Bolívar", was contested by champions and runner ups of regional associations.

Logo of the Liga Profesional de Fútbol Boliviano (LFPB), used until 2017.

The demise of Bolivian national team in the 1978 FIFA World Cup qualification (where it was thrashed by Brazil 8–0 and Peru 5–0) encouraged some clubs to create their own league, so 16 teams separated from their respective associations to establish the "Liga de Fútbol Profesional Boliviano" (Bolivian Professional Football League – LFPB) to organise championships autonomously, in 1977.

The creation of the LFPB ended the distinction. It also resulted in the creation of three separate entities: the FBF's role was restricted to the international representation of Bolivia in the sport, the newly created LFPB became the organizer of the sole first division tournament, and the LPFA, together with the rest of the regional associations, became the organizer of the second (and lower) division regionalized tournaments. It was the first and, until the formation of the basketball league (LIBOBASQUET) in 2014, the only professional sports league in the country.

In 2017, after a change of statutes in the FBF, the LFPB and the ANF were replaced by the "División Profesional" (professional division) and the "División Aficionados" (amateur division), respectively, both managed by the FBF from 2018 onwards.

== Format overview ==
The championship format has changed over the years. Beginning in 1977, the league ran with sixteen clubs divided into two series, but switched to fourteen clubs in two series playing two tournaments each year beginning in the mid 80s and economical problems with some teams led to another cut in the number of participants to twelve in 1991. Another change came in 2005 when teams decided to adapt to the International FIFA calendar, meaning the season would be played from August to June rather than from February to December, in order to avoid problems defining which teams would qualify for international tournaments. The league played a short tournament from February to June in 2005, and the official 2005–06 season started in August. This led to yet another problem — second division teams weren't keen on the idea of putting off relegation until June 2006. After negotiations, the league determined that relegation of the lowest standing club would take place after the completion of the Apertura tournament, making the Bolivian league an odd tournament where teams were relegated in the middle of the season. But this decision was overturned in November 2006 and the league switched back to a calendar-year season in 2007 starting with the Apertura tournament in March 2007. For the 2018 season, the number of teams was increased from twelve to fourteen.

Historically, teams from La Paz, Cochabamba and Santa Cruz have dominated the league. Until 2007 only San José won the league in 1995, but since then teams from the "big three" have struggled to win the league again and 3 teams from smaller cities have won it (Real Potosí, San José and Universitario).

Three teams share the record of never been relegated to "La Simón Bolivar" (2nd division): The Strongest, Oriente Petrolero and Bolívar (although they were relegated in 1969 before the LPFB era).

For the 2008 season, and for the first time, three tournaments were played instead of the usual two. The Apertura tournament was played from March to July on a round-robin system; the Clausura tournament played from August to October where the teams were divided into two series of 6 teams each, Group A comprised all western teams (plus Universitario) and Group B comprised all eastern teams (plus Wilstermann and Aurora), the top two teams of each group advanced to the semifinals and the finals. The newly instated play-off tournament consisted of home-away matches (and with away goals rule used for the first time).

An average points from the previous two seasons determines relegation, with the last placed team being directly relegated and replaced by the winner of the Copa Simón Bolívar. The team placed second-from-bottom plays a relegation play-off against the runner-up of the Copa Simón Bolívar.

== Current teams ==
Locations of the 2026 División Profesional teams.

Team	City	Stadium	Capacity
ABB	El Alto	Municipal de Villa Ingenio	25,000
Always Ready	El Alto	Municipal de Villa Ingenio	25,000
Aurora	Cochabamba	Félix Capriles	32,000
Blooming	Santa Cruz de la Sierra	Ramón Tahuichi Aguilera	38,000
Bolívar	La Paz	Hernando Siles	42,000
Guabirá	Montero	Gilberto Parada	13,000
GV San José	Oruro	Jesús Bermúdez	33,000
Independiente Petrolero	Sucre	Olímpico Patria	30,700
Nacional Potosí	Potosí	Víctor Agustín Ugarte	32,105
Oriente Petrolero	Santa Cruz de la Sierra	Ramón Tahuichi Aguilera	38,000
Real Oruro	Oruro	Jesús Bermúdez	33,000
Real Potosí	Potosí	Víctor Agustín Ugarte	32,105
Real Tomayapo	Tarija	IV Centenario	15,000
San Antonio Bulo Bulo	Entre Ríos	Carlos Villegas	17,000
The Strongest	La Paz	Hernando Siles	42,000
Universitario de Vinto	Vinto	Félix Capriles	32,000

== List of champions ==
- For the period 1914–1949, see La Paz Football Association (AFLP)
- (In bracket, title count):

Ed.	Season		Champion	Runner-up	Winning manager	Leading goalscorer(s)
Torneo Departamental (AFLP)
1	1950		Bolívar (1)	Litoral		(Argentina) Roberto Caparelli (Litoral)
2	1951		Always Ready (1)	Bolívar	(Uruguay) Julio Borelli	(Argentina) Juan Pinnola (Always Ready; 21 goals)
3	1952		The Strongest (1)	Always Ready	(Bolivia) Rufino Plata	(Bolivia) Víctor Agustín Ugarte (Bolívar; 14 goals)
4	1953		Bolívar (2)	Always Ready	(Bolivia) José Luis Rodríguez	(Argentina) Juan Pinnola (Always Ready; 15 goals)
Torneo Integrado Interdepartamental (AFLP)
5	1954		Litoral (1)	The Strongest		(Argentina) Juan Pinnola (Always Ready; 22 goals)
6	1955		San José (1)	Chaco Petrolero	(Bolivia) Rodolfo Mayda Camacho	(Argentina) Pedro Callá (Deportivo Municipal; 21 goals)
7	1956		Bolívar (3)	Deportivo Municipal	(Bolivia) Rodolfo Plaza	(Argentina) Juan Pinnola (Litoral; 22 goals)
8	1957		Always Ready (2)	Deportivo Municipal	(Uruguay) Julio Borelli	(Argentina) Juan Pinnola (Always Ready; 20 goals)
Torneo Nacional Mixto (AFO – AFC)
8	1957		Jorge Wilstermann (1)	Aurora	(Bolivia) Alberto De Acha	(Bolivia) Máximo Alcocer (Jorge Wilstermann; 14 goals)
Torneo Integrado Interdepartamental (AFLP)
9	1958		Jorge Wilstermann (2)	Deportivo Municipal	(Bolivia) José Villazón	(Bolivia) Freddy Valda (Chaco Petrolero; 26 goals)
10	1959		Jorge Wilstermann (3)	Always Ready	(Argentina) Saúl Ongaro	(Bolivia) Renán López (Jorge Wilstermann; 25 goals)
Torneo Mayor de la República (FBF)
11	1960		Jorge Wilstermann (4)	Aurora	(Bolivia) José Villazón	
12	1961		Deportivo Municipal (1)	The Strongest	(Bolivia) Félix Deheza	
—	1962		La Paz league was won by Chaco Petrolero but this is not considered a national title.			
13	1963		Aurora (1)	Jorge Wilstermann	(Brazil) Pacífico Becerra	
Copa Simón Bolívar (FBF)
14	1964		The Strongest (2)	Deportivo Municipal	(Bolivia) Juan Valenzuela	
15	1965		Deportivo Municipal (2)	Jorge Wilstermann	(Bolivia) José Luis Rodríguez	
16	1966		Bolívar (4)	31 de Octubre	(Greece) Dan Georgiadis	
17	1967		Jorge Wilstermann (5)	Always Ready	(Bolivia) José Carlos Trigo	
18	1968		Bolívar (5)	Litoral (Cochabamba)	(Argentina) Antonio Imbelloni	
19	1969		Universitario de La Paz (1)	Bolívar	(Bolivia) Próspero Benítez	(Argentina) Juan Américo Díaz (Mariscal Santa Cruz; 23 goals)
20	1970		Chaco Petrolero (1)	The Strongest	(Bolivia) Arturo López	(Bolivia) Adolfo Flores Espinoza (Chaco Petrolero; 17 goals)
21	1971		Oriente Petrolero (1)	Chaco Petrolero	(Paraguay) Eliseo Báez	(Argentina) Juan Américo Díaz (The Strongest; 12 goals)
22	1972		Jorge Wilstermann (6)	Oriente Petrolero	(Bolivia) José Carlos Trigo	(Brazil) Milton Teodoro Joana (Jorge Wilstermann; 21 goals)
23	1973		Jorge Wilstermann (7)	Deportivo Municipal	(Bolivia) José Carlos Trigo	
24	1974		The Strongest (3)	Jorge Wilstermann	(Bolivia) Rolando Vargas	
25	1975		Guabirá (1)	Bolívar	(Brazil) Waltersilio R. Coutinho	
26	1976		Bolívar (6)	Oriente Petrolero	(Germany) Edward Virba	(Bolivia) Jesús Reynaldo (Bolívar; 12 goals)
Liga de Fútbol Profesional Boliviano (LFPB)
27	1977		The Strongest (4)	Oriente Petrolero	(Bolivia) Freddy Valda	(Bolivia) Jesús Reynaldo (Bolívar; 28 goals)
28	1978		Bolívar (7)	Jorge Wilstermann	(Bolivia) Ramiro Blacut	(Bolivia) Jesús Reynaldo (Bolívar; 26 goals)
29	1979		Oriente Petrolero (2)	The Strongest	(Chile) Antonio Valdez	(Argentina) Horacio Baldessari (Blooming; 31 goals)
30	1980		Jorge Wilstermann (8)	The Strongest	(Chile) Raúl Pino	(Argentina) Juan Carlos Sánchez (Guabirá; 21 goals)
31	1981		Jorge Wilstermann (9)	Blooming	(Bolivia) José Carlos Trigo	(Argentina) Juan Carlos Sánchez (Blooming; 27 goals)
32	1982		Bolívar (8)	Jorge Wilstermann	(Bolivia) Wilfredo Camacho	(Argentina) Horacio Baldessari (Oriente Petrolero; 25 goals)
33	1983		Bolívar (9)	Oriente Petrolero	(Bolivia) Abdúl Aramayo	(Argentina) Juan Carlos Sánchez (Blooming; 31 goals)
34	1984		Blooming (1)	Bolívar	(Chile) Raúl Pino	(Bolivia) Víctor Hugo Antelo (Oriente Petrolero; 38 goals)
35	1985		Bolívar (10)	Jorge Wilstermann	(Peru) Moisés Barack	(Bolivia) Víctor Hugo Antelo (Oriente Petrolero; 37 goals)
36	1986		The Strongest (5)	Oriente Petrolero	(Argentina) Juan Farías	(Bolivia) Jesús Reynaldo (The Strongest; 36 goals)
37	1987		Bolívar (11)	Oriente Petrolero	(Argentina) Jorge Habegger	(Bolivia) Fernando Salinas (Bolívar; 28 goals)
38	1988		Bolívar (12)	The Strongest	(Argentina) Jorge Habegger	(Bolivia) Fernando Salinas (Bolívar; 21 goals)
39	1989		The Strongest (6)	Oriente Petrolero	(Peru) Moisés Barack	(Bolivia) Víctor Hugo Antelo (Real Santa Cruz; 22 goals)
40	1990		Oriente Petrolero (3)	Bolívar	(Bolivia) Antonio De La Cerda	(Argentina) Juan Carlos Sánchez (San José; 20 goals)
41	1991		Bolívar (13)	San José	(Peru) Moisés Barack	(Peru) Jorge Hirano (Bolívar; 19 goals) (Brazil) Jason Rodríguez (Independiente Petrolero; 19 goals) (Brazil) Sebastião da Silva (Oriente Petrolero; 19 goals)
42	1992		Bolívar (14)	San José	(Russia) Vitaliy Shevchenko	(Bolivia) Álvaro Peña (San José; 29 goals)
43	1993		The Strongest (7)	Bolívar	(Bolivia) Carlos Aragonés	(Bolivia) Víctor Hugo Antelo (San José; 20 goals)
44	1994		Bolívar (15)	Jorge Wilstermann	(Spain) Antonio López	(Argentina) Óscar González (Independiente Petrolero; 23 goals)
45	1995		San José (2)	Guabirá	(Uruguay) Walter Roque	(Bolivia) Juan Berthy Suárez (Guabirá; 29 goals)
46	1996		Bolívar (16)	Oriente Petrolero	(Argentina) Jorge Habegger	(Bolivia) Dimas Flores (Deportivo Municipal; 16 goals)
47	1997		Bolívar (17)	Oriente Petrolero	(Bolivia) Luis Orozco	(Bolivia) Víctor Hugo Antelo (Blooming; 24 goals)
48	1998		Blooming (2)	Jorge Wilstermann	(Bolivia) Carlos Aragonés	(Bolivia) Víctor Hugo Antelo (Blooming; 31 goals)
49	1999		Blooming (3)	The Strongest	(Bolivia) Carlos Aragonés	(Bolivia) Víctor Hugo Antelo (Blooming; 30 goals) (Argentina) Antonio Vidal González (The Strongest; 30 goals)
50	2000		Jorge Wilstermann (10)	Oriente Petrolero	(Bolivia) Tito Montaño	(Argentina) Daniel Delfino (The Strongest; 28 goals)
51	2001		Oriente Petrolero (4)	Bolívar	(Bolivia) Víctor Hugo Antelo	(Bolivia) José Alfredo Castillo (Oriente Petrolero; 42 goals)
52	2002		Bolívar (18)	Oriente Petrolero	(Bolivia) Vladimir Soria	(Bolivia) Joaquín Botero (Bolívar; 49 goals)
53	2003	Apertura	The Strongest (8)	Bolívar	(Argentina) Néstor Clausen	(Brazil) Thiago Leitão (Jorge Wilstermann; 19 goals)
54	2003	Clausura	The Strongest (9)	Jorge Wilstermann	(Argentina) Néstor Clausen	(Bolivia) Miguel Mercado (Bolívar; 18 goals)
55	2004	Apertura	Bolívar (19)	Aurora	(Bolivia) Vladimir Soria	(Bolivia) Martín Menacho (Real Potosí; 15 goals)
56	2004	Clausura	The Strongest (10)	Oriente Petrolero	(Paraguay) Luis Galarza	(Paraguay) Pablo Daniel Escobar (San José; 17 goals)
57	2005	Adecuación	Bolívar (20)	The Strongest	(Bolivia) Abdúl Aramayo	(Paraguay) Rubén Aguilera (San José; 22 goals)
58	2005–06	Apertura	Blooming (4)	Bolívar	(Argentina) (Bolivia) Gustavo Quinteros	(Argentina) Juan Matías Fischer (Bolívar; 16 goals)
59	2005–06	Clausura	Bolívar (21)	Real Potosí	(Bolivia) Carlos Aragonés	(Paraguay) Alfredo Jara (Real Potosí; 16 goals)
60	2006	Segundo Torneo	Jorge Wilstermann (11)	Real Potosí	(Bolivia) Mauricio Soria	(Paraguay) Alfredo Jara (Real Potosí; 19 goals)
61	2007	Apertura	Real Potosí (1)	Bolívar	(Bolivia) Mauricio Soria	(Bolivia) Diego Cabrera (Aurora; 14 goals)
62	2007	Clausura	San José (3)	La Paz	(Bolivia) Marcos Ferrufino	(Argentina) Juan Maraude (Real Mamoré; 16 goals)
63	2008	Apertura	Universitario de Sucre (1)	La Paz	(Bolivia) Eduardo Villegas	(Brazil) Anderson Gonzaga (Blooming; 17 goals)
64	2008	Clausura	Aurora (2)	Blooming	(Bolivia) Julio César Baldivieso	(Argentina) Luis Sillero (Real Potosí; 17 goals)
65	2009	Apertura	Bolívar (22)	Real Potosí	(Argentina) (Bolivia) Gustavo Quinteros	(Uruguay) William Ferreira (Bolívar; 16 goals)
66	2009	Clausura	Blooming (5)	Bolívar	(Argentina) Víctor Hugo Andrada	(Uruguay) William Ferreira (Bolívar; 9 goals) (Argentina) Cristian Díaz (San José; 9 goals) (Argentina) Pablo Vázquez (The Strongest; 9 goals)
67	2010	Apertura	Jorge Wilstermann (12)	Oriente Petrolero	(Bolivia) Eduardo Villegas	(Argentina) Cristian Díaz (San José; 16 goals)
68	2010	Clausura	Oriente Petrolero (5)	Bolívar	(Argentina) (Bolivia) Gustavo Quinteros	(Uruguay) William Ferreira (Bolívar; 14 goals)
69	2011	Adecuación	Bolívar (23)	Real Potosí	(Argentina) Guillermo Hoyos	(Argentina) Juan Maraude (Real Mamoré; 19 goals)
70	2011–12	Apertura	The Strongest (11)	Universitario de Sucre	(Bolivia) Mauricio Soria	(Uruguay) William Ferreira (Bolívar; 16 goals)
71	2011–12	Clausura	The Strongest (12)	San José	(Bolivia) Eduardo Villegas	(Bolivia) Carlos Saucedo (San José; 17 goals)
72	2012–13	Apertura	The Strongest (13)	San José	(Bolivia) Eduardo Villegas	(Bolivia) Carlos Saucedo (San José; 23 goals)
73	2012–13	Clausura	Bolívar (24)	Oriente Petrolero	(Spain) Miguel Ángel Portugal	(Uruguay) William Ferreira (Bolívar; 17 goals) (Bolivia) Eduardo Fierro (Universitario de Sucre; 17 goals)
74	2013–14	Apertura	The Strongest (14)	Bolívar	(Bolivia) Eduardo Villegas	(Bolivia) Carlos Saucedo (San José; 16 goals) (Brazil) Marcelo Gomes (San José; 16 goals)
75	2013–14	Clausura	Universitario de Sucre (2)	San José	(Bolivia) Javier Vega Estívarez	(Paraguay) Carlos Neumann (San José; 18 goals)
76	2014–15	Apertura	Bolívar (25)	Oriente Petrolero	(Spain) Xabier Azkargorta	(Spain) Juanmi Callejón (Bolívar; 15 goals)
77	2014–15	Clausura	Bolívar (26)	The Strongest	(Spain) Xabier Azkargorta	(Argentina) Martín Palavicini (Universitario de Sucre; 13 goals)
78	2015–16	Apertura	Sport Boys (1)	Bolívar	(Argentina) Carlos Leeb	(Argentina) Martín Palavicini (Universitario de Sucre; 19 goals)
79	2015–16	Clausura	Jorge Wilstermann (13)	The Strongest	(Argentina) Julio Alberto Zamora	(Argentina) Juan Vogliotti (Ciclón; 12 goals)
80	2016–17	2016 Apertura	The Strongest (15)	Bolívar	(Venezuela) César Farías	(Spain) Juanmi Callejón (Bolívar; 16 goals)
81	2016–17	2017 Apertura	Bolívar (27)	The Strongest	(Spain) Beñat San José	(Bolivia) Carlos Saucedo (Guabirá; 17 goals)
82	2016–17	Clausura	Bolívar (28)	The Strongest	(Spain) Beñat San José	(Bolivia) Gilbert Álvarez (Jorge Wilstermann; 16 goals)
División de Fútbol Profesional (FBF)
83	2018	Apertura	Jorge Wilstermann (14)	The Strongest	(Bolivia) Guillermo Álvaro Peña	(Bolivia) Carlos Saucedo (San José; 18 goals)
84	2018	Clausura	San José (4)	The Strongest	(Bolivia) Eduardo Villegas	(Argentina) Marcos Riquelme (Bolívar; 20 goals) (Colombia) Jair Reinoso (San José; 20 goals) (Panama) Rolando Blackburn (The Strongest; 20 goals)
85	2019	Apertura	Bolívar (29)	The Strongest	(Argentina) César Vigevani	(Bolivia) Carlos Saucedo (San José; 23 goals)
86	2019	Clausura	Jorge Wilstermann (15)	The Strongest	(Argentina) Christian Díaz	(Bolivia) Carlos Saucedo (San José; 19 goals) (Colombia) Jair Reinoso (The Strongest; 19 goals) (Spain) Juanmi Callejón (Bolívar; 19 goals)
87	2020	Apertura	Always Ready (3)	The Strongest	(Argentina) Omar Asad	(Argentina) Marcos Riquelme (Bolívar; 20 goals)
—	2020	Clausura	(Cancelled due to the COVID-19 pandemic)			
88	2021		Independiente Petrolero (1)	Always Ready	(Argentina) Marcelo Robledo	(Argentina) Martín Prost (Independiente Petrolero; 18 goals)
89	2022	Apertura	Bolívar (30)	The Strongest	(Brazil) Antônio Carlos Zago	(Brazil) Francisco da Costa (Bolívar; 10 goals)
90	2022	Clausura	(Abandoned due to civil unrest in the Santa Cruz Department)			(Argentina) Marcos Riquelme (Always Ready; 19 goals)
91	2023		The Strongest (16)	Bolívar	(Bolivia) Pablo Cabanillas	(Dominican Republic) Dorny Romero (Always Ready; 25 goals)
92	2024		Bolívar (31)	San Antonio Bulo Bulo	(Argentina) Flavio Robatto	(Brazil) Daniel Passira (San Antonio Bulo Bulo; 22 goals)
93	2025		Always Ready (4)	Bolívar	(Bolivia) Julio César Baldivieso	(Argentina) Óscar Villalba (Independiente Petrolero; 25 goals)
94	2026					

Notes

- AFLP: Asociación de Fútbol de La Paz
- AFC: Asociación de Fútbol Cochabamba
- AFO: Asociación de Fútbol Oruro

== Titles by club ==
- Teams in **bold** compete in the Primera División as of the 2026 season.
- Italics indicates clubs that no longer exist or disaffiliated from the FBF.

Rank	Club	Winners	Runners-up	Winning years	Runners-up years
1	**Bolívar**	31	17	1950, 1953, 1956, 1966, 1968, 1976, 1978, 1982, 1983, 1985, 1987, 1988, 1991, 1992, 1994, 1996, 1997, 2002, 2004 Apertura, 2005 Adecuación, 2005–06 Clausura, 2009 Apertura, 2011 Adecuación, 2013 Clausura, 2014 Apertura, 2015 Clausura, 2017 Apertura, 2017 Clausura, 2019 Apertura, 2022 Apertura, 2024	1951, 1969, 1975, 1984, 1990, 1993, 2001, 2003 Apertura, 2005–06 Apertura, 2007 Apertura, 2009 Clausura, 2010 Clausura, 2013 Apertura, 2015 Apertura, 2016 Apertura, 2023, 2025
2	**The Strongest**	16	18	1952, 1964, 1974, 1977, 1986, 1989, 1993, 2003 Apertura, 2003 Clausura, 2004 Clausura, 2011 Apertura, 2012 Clausura, 2012 Apertura, 2013 Apertura, 2016 Apertura, 2023	1954, 1961, 1970, 1979, 1980, 1988, 1999, 2005 Adecuación, 2015 Clausura, 2016 Clausura, 2017 Apertura, 2017 Clausura, 2018 Apertura, 2018 Clausura, 2019 Apertura, 2019 Clausura, 2020 Apertura, 2022 Apertura
3	Jorge Wilstermann	15	9	1957, 1958, 1959, 1960, 1967, 1972, 1973, 1980, 1981, 2000, 2006 Segundo Torneo, 2010 Apertura, 2016 Clausura, 2018 Apertura, 2019 Clausura	1963, 1965, 1974, 1978, 1982, 1985, 1994, 1998, 2003 Clausura
4	**Oriente Petrolero**	5	15	1971, 1979, 1990, 2001, 2010 Clausura	1972, 1976, 1977, 1983, 1986, 1987, 1989, 1996, 1997, 2000, 2002, 2004 Clausura, 2010 Apertura, 2013 Clausura, 2014 Apertura
5	**Blooming**	5	2	1984, 1998, 1999, 2005–06 Apertura, 2009 Clausura	1983, 2008 Clausura
6	**Always Ready**	4	6	1951, 1957, 2020 Apertura, 2025	1952, 1953, 1959, 1963, 1967, 2021
7	San José	4	5	1955, 1995, 2007 Clausura, 2018 Clausura	1991, 1992, 2012 Clausura, 2012 Apertura, 2014 Clausura
8	Deportivo Municipal	2	5	1961, 1965	1956, 1957 Integrado, 1958, 1964, 1973
9	**Aurora**	2	4	1963, 2008 Clausura	1957, 1960, 1964, 2004 Apertura
10	Universitario de Sucre	2	1	2008 Apertura, 2014 Clausura	2011 Apertura
11	**Real Potosí**	1	4	2007 Apertura	2005–06 Clausura, 2006 Segundo Torneo, 2009 Apertura, 2011 Adecuación
12	Chaco Petrolero	1	2	1970	1955, 1971
12	**Guabirá**	1	1	1975	1995
14	Litoral	1	1	1954	1950
15	**Independiente Petrolero**	1	0	2021	—
15	Sport Boys	1	0	2015 Apertura	—
15	Universitario de La Paz	1	0	1969	—
