= 1969 Bolivian Primera División =

Bolivian Primera División
- Season: 1969
- Champions: Universitario de La Paz

The 1969 Bolivian Primera División, the first division of Bolivian football (soccer), was played by 14 teams. The champion was Universitario de La Paz.

== La Paz Group ==
Pos	Team	Pld	W	D	L	GF	GA	GD	Pts
1	Bolívar	14	8	4	2	24	15	+9	20
2	Deportivo Municipal	14	8	3	3	27	20	+7	19
3	Mariscal Santa Cruz	14	6	4	4	30	20	+10	16
4	Universitario de La Paz	14	7	2	5	30	23	+7	16
5	Ferroviario	14	4	4	6	25	33	−8	12
6	Always Ready	14	4	4	6	21	30	−9	12
7	31 de Octubre	14	3	4	7	15	28	−13	10
8	The Strongest	0	0	0	0	0	0	0	0

== National Stage ==
=== Group A ===
Pos	Team	Pld	W	D	L	GF	GA	GD	Pts
1	Ferroviario	8	4	2	2	16	8	+8	10
2	San José	8	3	4	1	16	14	+2	10
3	Petrolero	8	4	2	2	15	13	+2	10
4	Litoral	8	3	3	2	17	8	+9	9
5	Oruro Royal	8	0	1	7	9	30	−21	1

=== Group B ===
Pos	Team	Pld	W	D	L	GF	GA	GD	Pts
1	Universitario de La Paz	8	5	1	2	0	0	0	11
2	Mariscal Santa Cruz	8	5	0	3	0	0	0	10
3	Deportivo Municipal	8	3	1	4	0	0	0	7
4	Jorge Wilstermann	8	3	0	5	0	0	0	6
5	Destroyers	8	3	0	5	0	0	0	6

=== Group C ===
Pos	Team	Pld	W	D	L	GF	GA	GD	Pts
1	Oriente Petrolero	6	4	2	0	20	3	+17	10
2	Universidad de Santa Cruz	6	2	2	2	11	10	+1	6
3	Universitario	6	1	2	3	5	14	−9	4
4	Stormers	6	2	0	4	7	16	−9	4

=== Second stage ===
Pos	Team	Pld	W	D	L	GF	GA	GD	Pts
1	Bolívar	3	2	1	0	6	2	+4	5
2	Universitario de La Paz	3	2	0	1	6	2	+4	4
3	Mariscal Santa Cruz	3	1	1	1	6	4	+2	3
4	Ferroviario	3	0	0	3	4	14	−10	0

=== Final Group ===
Pos	Team	Pld	W	D	L	GF	GA	GD	Pts
1	Universitario de La Paz	10	7	1	2	24	13	+11	15
2	Bolívar	10	5	2	3	18	18	0	12
3	Oriente Petrolero	10	5	1	4	27	20	+7	11
4	Mariscal Santa Cruz	10	5	1	4	22	16	+6	11
5	San José	10	2	2	6	21	30	−9	6
6	Universidad de Santa Cruz	10	2	1	7	17	32	−15	5
