= List of football clubs in Bolivia =

This is a list of active and defunct football (soccer) clubs in Bolivia.

== Active clubs ==
Club	City
27 de Mayo	Cobija
31 de Octubre	Oruro
Alemán	Sucre
ABB	La Paz
Always Ready	La Paz
Atlético Ciclón	Tarija
Aurora	Cochabamba
Blooming	Santa Cruz
Bolívar	La Paz
Cala Cala	Cochabamba
Chaco Petrolero	La Paz
Cooper	Santa Cruz
Deportivo Cristal	Oruro
Destroyers	Santa Cruz
Esparta	Cochabamba
Estudiantes del Oriente	Santa Cruz
Fancesa	Sucre
Deportivo Ferroviario	La Paz
Guabirá	Montero
Independiente Petrolero	Sucre
Jorge Wilstermann	Cochabamba
La Palmera	Trinidad
Litoral	Cochabamba
Mariscal Braun	La Paz
Municipal Potosí	Potosí
Nacional Potosí	Potosí
Oriente Petrolero	Santa Cruz
Oruro Royal	Oruro
Petrolero	Cochabamba
Real Mamoré	Trinidad
Real Potosí	Potosí
Real Santa Cruz	Santa Cruz
Stormer's	Sucre
Regatas Flamenco	La Paz
San José	Oruro
Santos de Belén	Oruro
Tigres	La Paz
The Strongest	La Paz
Unión Central	Tarija
Universidad Santa Cruz	Santa Cruz
Universitario	Sucre
Universitario Tarija	Tarija
Vaca Díez	Cobija

== Defunct clubs ==
Club	City
Colegio Militar	La Paz
Flamengo	Sucre
La Paz	La Paz
Mariscal Santa Cruz	La Paz
