= 1956 Bolivian Primera División =

Bolivian Primera División
- Season: 1956
- Champions: Bolívar
- Relegated: Ingavi

The 1956 Bolivian Primera División, the first division of Bolivian football (soccer), was played by 12 teams. The champion was Bolívar.

== Torneo Integrado ==
=== Standings ===
Pos	Team	Pld	W	D	L	GF	GA	GD	Pts
1	Bolívar	22	13	5	4	50	33	+17	31
2	Deportivo Municipal	22	12	4	6	58	38	+20	28
3	Litoral	22	12	3	7	52	39	+13	27
4	San José	22	11	4	7	56	42	+14	26
5	Jorge Wilstermann	22	11	3	8	43	38	+5	25
6	Chaco Petrolero	22	8	8	6	53	45	+8	24
7	Ferroviario	22	7	8	7	37	30	+7	22
8	Aurora	22	6	9	7	30	32	−2	21
9	The Strongest	22	6	6	10	39	57	−18	18
10	Northern	22	6	4	12	43	55	−12	16
11	Oruro Royal	22	5	4	13	34	57	−23	14
12	Ingavi	22	5	2	15	41	80	−39	12
