= 1965 Bolivian Primera División =

Bolivian Primera División
- Season: 1965
- Champions: Deportivo Municipal

The 1965 Bolivian Primera División, the first division of Bolivian football (soccer), was played by 4 teams. The champion was Deportivo Municipal.

== La Paz Group ==
Pos	Team	Pld	W	D	L	GF	GA	GD	Pts
1	Deportivo Municipal	14	6	7	1	26	16	+10	19
2	The Strongest	14	7	5	2	33	23	+10	19
3	31 de Octubre	14	7	3	4	27	19	+8	17
4	Chaco Petrolero	14	5	4	5	24	24	0	14
5	Always Ready	14	4	5	5	33	36	−3	13
6	Universitario de La Paz	14	3	6	5	20	26	−6	12
7	Unión Maestranza	14	3	5	6	23	32	−9	11
8	Ferroviario	14	2	3	9	24	34	−10	7

== Final Group ==
Pos	Team	Pld	W	D	L	GF	GA	GD	Pts
1	Deportivo Municipal	6	4	1	1	22	8	+14	9
2	Jorge Wilstermann	6	3	1	2	17	12	+5	7
3	Oriente Petrolero	6	1	3	2	6	17	−11	5
4	San José	6	1	1	4	8	16	−8	3
