= 1966 Bolivian Primera División =

Bolivian Primera División
- Season: 1966
- Champions: Bolívar

The 1966 Bolivian Primera División, the first division of Bolivian football (soccer), was played by 4 teams. The champion was Bolívar.

== La Paz Group ==
Pos	Team	Pld	W	D	L	GF	GA	GD	Pts
1	Bolívar	14	7	4	3	26	16	+10	18
2	31 de Octubre	14	7	3	4	23	14	+9	17
3	Unión Maestranza	14	8	1	5	25	21	+4	17
4	Always Ready	14	5	5	4	21	19	+2	15
5	The Strongest	14	5	5	4	19	17	+2	15
6	Deportivo Municipal	14	5	3	6	20	20	0	13
7	Universitario de La Paz	14	4	3	7	12	25	−13	11
8	Chaco Petrolero	14	0	6	8	17	31	−14	6

== Final Group ==
Pos	Team	Pld	W	D	L	GF	GA	GD	Pts
1	Bolívar	6	4	1	1	12	7	+5	9
2	31 de Octubre	6	4	0	2	8	7	+1	8
3	Jorge Wilstermann	6	2	1	3	5	6	−1	5
4	Litoral	6	0	2	4	5	10	−5	2
