= 1957 Bolivian Primera División =

Bolivian Primera División
- Season: 1957
- Champions: Integrado: Always Ready; Nacional: Jorge Wilstermann

The 1957 Bolivian Primera División, the first division of Bolivian football (soccer), was played in two tournaments, The Torneo Integrado and Torneo Nacional Mixto. The champions were Always Ready and Jorge Wilstermann respectively.

== Torneo Nacional Mixto ==
=== Standings ===
Pos	Team	Pld	W	D	L	GF	GA	GD	Pts
1	Jorge Wilstermann	12	10	1	1	38	16	+22	21
2	Aurora	12	6	4	2	25	17	+8	16
3	San José	12	5	2	5	34	22	+12	12
4	Bata	12	3	4	5	17	26	−9	10
5	Oruro Royal	12	4	2	6	19	30	−11	10
6	Internacional	12	4	1	7	25	26	−1	9
7	Petrolero	12	2	2	8	14	35	−21	6

== Torneo Integrado ==
=== Standings ===
Pos	Team	Pld	W	D	L	GF	GA	GD	Pts
1	Always Ready	14	7	5	2	37	18	+19	19
2	Deportivo Municipal	14	8	3	3	35	23	+12	19
3	Chaco Petrolero	14	7	1	6	37	30	+7	15
4	Bolívar	14	5	4	5	34	34	0	14
5	The Strongest	14	5	4	5	33	34	−1	14
6	Litoral	14	6	1	7	26	36	−10	13
7	Northern	14	3	4	7	24	35	−11	10
8	Ferroviario	14	2	4	8	28	44	−16	8
