= 1959 Bolivian Primera División =

Bolivian Primera División
- Season: 1959
- Champions: Jorge Wilstermann
- Relegated: Northern

The 1959 Bolivian Primera División, the first division of Bolivian football (soccer), was played by 12 teams. The champions was Jorge Wilstermann.

== Torneo Nacional Mixto ==
=== Standings ===
Pos	Team	Pld	W	D	L	GF	GA	GD	Pts
1	Jorge Wilstermann	22	16	4	2	65	30	+35	36
2	Always Ready	22	13	5	4	61	40	+21	31
3	Bolívar	22	13	4	5	47	30	+17	30
4	Aurora	22	10	7	5	42	25	+17	27
5	San José	22	11	3	8	53	47	+6	25
6	Deportivo Municipal	22	9	6	7	41	34	+7	24
7	Chaco Petrolero	22	8	3	11	38	48	−10	19
8	Ferroviario	22	7	3	12	41	51	−10	17
9	1 de Mayo	22	6	4	12	37	53	−16	16
10	The Strongest	22	5	5	12	31	51	−20	15
11	Litoral	22	5	3	14	36	52	−16	13
12	Internacional	22	3	5	14	41	70	−29	11
