= 1958 Bolivian Primera División =

Bolivian Primera División
- Season: 1958
- Champions: Jorge Wilstermann
- Relegated: Northern

The 1958 Bolivian Primera División, the first division of Bolivian football (soccer), was played by 12 teams. The champion was Jorge Wilstermann.

== Torneo Nacional Mixto ==
=== Standings ===
Pos	Team	Pld	W	D	L	GF	GA	GD	Pts
1	Jorge Wilstermann	22	13	5	4	66	40	+26	31
2	Deportivo Municipal	22	11	5	6	61	44	+17	27
3	San José	22	10	3	9	54	48	+6	23
4	Aurora	22	9	5	8	45	43	+2	23
5	The Strongest	22	11	10	1	49	49	0	32
6	Bolívar	22	10	3	9	51	54	−3	23
7	Always Ready	22	10	2	10	58	46	+12	22
8	Internacional	22	7	7	8	43	42	+1	21
9	Chaco Petrolero	22	10	1	11	56	59	−3	21
10	1 de Mayo	23	9	3	11	37	54	−17	21
11	Litoral	22	5	9	8	38	44	−6	19
12	Northern	22	4	3	15	38	73	−35	11
