= 1967 Bolivian Primera División =

Bolivian Primera División
- Season: 1967
- Champions: Jorge Wilstermann

The 1967 Bolivian Primera División, the first division of Bolivian football (soccer), was played by 6 teams. The champions was Jorge Wilstermann.

== La Paz Group ==
Pos	Team	Pld	W	D	L	GF	GA	GD	Pts
1	Bolívar	14	11	1	2	36	15	+21	23
2	Always Ready	14	7	4	3	31	24	+7	18
3	The Strongest	14	8	1	5	24	15	+9	17
4	Mariscal Santa Cruz	14	6	5	3	25	19	+6	17
5	Universitario de La Paz	14	5	1	8	18	31	−13	11
6	Deportivo Municipal	14	4	2	8	17	28	−11	10
7	31 de Octubre	14	4	0	10	26	36	−10	8
8	Unión Maestranza	14	3	2	9	17	28	−11	8

== Final Group ==
Pos	Team	Pld	W	D	L	GF	GA	GD	Pts
1	Jorge Wilstermann	10	7	1	2	17	8	+9	15
2	Always Ready	10	4	4	2	12	10	+2	12
3	Blooming	10	4	3	3	16	7	+9	11
4	Bolívar	10	4	2	4	15	12	+3	10
5	Oriente Petrolero	10	2	4	4	7	18	−11	8
6	Bata	10	2	0	8	6	18	−12	4
