= 1964 Bolivian Primera División =

Bolivian Primera División
- Season: 1964
- Champions: The Strongest
- Relegated: Bolívar

The 1964 Bolivian Primera División, the first division of Bolivian football (soccer), was played by 8 teams. The champion was The Strongest.

== La Paz Group ==
| Pos | Team | Pld | W | D | L | GF | GA | GD | Pts |
|---|---|---|---|---|---|---|---|---|---|
| 1 | The Strongest | 14 | 9 | 4 | 1 | 34 | 14 | +20 | 22 |
| 2 | Deportivo Municipal | 14 | 7 | 4 | 3 | 28 | 18 | +10 | 18 |
| 3 | 31 de Octubre | 14 | 8 | 2 | 4 | 32 | 22 | +10 | 18 |
| 4 | Unión Maestranza | 14 | 6 | 1 | 7 | 26 | 36 | −10 | 13 |
| 5 | Chaco Petrolero | 14 | 5 | 2 | 7 | 29 | 29 | 0 | 12 |
| 6 | Always Ready | 14 | 5 | 1 | 8 | 24 | 47 | −23 | 11 |
| 7 | Universitario de La Paz | 14 | 5 | 1 | 8 | 26 | 42 | −16 | 11 |
| 8 | Bolívar | 14 | 2 | 3 | 9 | 24 | 35 | −11 | 7 |
