= 1997 Liga de Fútbol Profesional Boliviano =

The 1997 season of the Liga de Fútbol Profesional Boliviano was the 40th season of top-tier football in Bolivia.

== Torneo Apertura ==
=== Group A ===
Pos	Team	Pld	W	D	L	GF	GA	GD	Pts
1	The Strongest	10	5	4	1	18	6	+12	19
2	Bolívar	10	4	3	3	15	9	+6	15
3	San José	10	4	3	3	16	15	+1	15
4	Independiente Petrolero	10	4	1	5	15	16	−1	13
5	Chaco Petrolero	10	4	1	5	12	21	−9	13
6	Deportivo Municipal	10	1	4	5	10	19	−9	7

=== Group B ===
Pos	Team	Pld	W	D	L	GF	GA	GD	Pts
1	Blooming	10	6	2	2	25	12	+13	20
2	Guabirá	10	6	1	3	18	13	+5	19
3	Jorge Wilstermann	10	5	0	5	14	14	0	15
4	Real Santa Cruz	10	3	2	5	14	20	−6	11
5	Destroyers	10	3	2	5	13	20	−7	11
6	Oriente Petrolero	10	2	3	5	11	16	−5	9

=== Semifinals ===
First Leg
8 May 1997

Guabirá	1 – 0	The Strongest
Céspedes 22'

Estadio Real Santa Cruz, Santa Cruz
First Leg
10 May 1997

Blooming	0 – 2	Bolívar
		González 47'; Castillo 89'

Estadio Real Santa Cruz, Santa Cruz
Second Leg
11 May 1997

The Strongest	2 – 0	Guabirá
Sánchez 69' (pen.); Castillo 76' (pen.)

Estadio Rafael Mendoza, La Paz
Second Leg
13 May 1997

Bolívar	3 – 3	Blooming
Ribera 3' (o.g.); Castillo 16', 81'		Ortíz 48'; Antelo 80', 83'

Estadio Simón Bolivar, La Paz

=== Final ===
First Leg
16 May 1997

The Strongest	0 – 1	Bolívar
		Cueto 82'

Estadio Rafael Mendoza, La Paz
Second Leg
18 May 1997

Bolívar	2 – 0	The Strongest
González 29' (pen.); Sandy 43'		Cueto 82'

Estadio Simón Bolivar, La Paz

== Torneo Clausura ==
=== Group A ===
Pos	Team	Pld	W	D	L	GF	GA	GD	Pts
1	Bolivar	12	7	3	2	30	15	+15	24
2	Destroyers	12	6	3	3	19	20	−1	21
3	Chaco Petrolero	12	5	2	5	16	14	+2	17
4	Oriente Petrolero	12	4	3	5	17	17	0	15
5	San José	12	4	1	7	19	23	−4	13
6	Real Santa Cruz	12	2	4	6	6	18	−12	10

=== Group B ===
Pos	Team	Pld	W	D	L	GF	GA	GD	Pts
1	The Strongest	12	5	5	2	23	13	+10	20
2	Blooming	12	5	4	3	17	18	−1	19
3	Jorge Wilstermann	12	4	5	3	16	16	0	17
4	Independiente Petrolero	12	4	3	5	18	17	+1	15
5	Guabirá	12	3	5	4	15	19	−4	14
6	Deportivo Municipal	12	3	2	7	14	21	−7	11 (Note: Relegated)

== Final stage ==
Pos	Team	Pld	W	D	L	GF	GA	GD	Pts
1	Bolívar	10	8	1	1	33	9	+24	25 (Note: Bolívar and Oriente Petrolero qualify for Copa Libertadores 1998)
2	Oriente Petrolero	10	6	0	4	20	14	+6	18
3	Blooming	10	5	1	4	21	19	+2	16
4	The Strongest	10	5	0	5	16	19	−3	15
5	Jorge Wilstermann	10	4	0	6	16	23	−7	12
6	Chaco Petrolero	10	1	0	9	10	32	−22	3

== Play-offs ==
=== Copa Conmebol ===
First Leg
30 July 1997

Real Santa Cruz	1 – 1	The Strongest

Second Leg
7 August 1997

The Strongest	0 – 2	Real Santa Cruz

Real Santa Cruz qualified for the 1997 Copa Conmebol.

=== Promotion/relegation ===
First Leg

Universidad de Cochabamba	0 – 1	Destroyers

Second Leg

Destroyers	2 – 1	Universidad de Cochabamba

Destroyers remain at first level; Club Real Potosí won promotion

== Title ==
Liga de Fútbol Profesional Boliviano
1997 champion
Bolívar
11th title

== See also ==
- Bolivia national football team 1997
