= 1960 Bolivian Primera División =

Bolivian Primera División
- Season: 1960
- Champions: Jorge Wilstermann

The 1960 Bolivian Primera División, the first division of Bolivian football (soccer), was played by 8 teams. The champions were Jorge Wilstermann.

== Group stage ==
=== Group A ===
Pos	Team	Pld	W	D	L	GF	GA	GD	Pts
1	Bolívar	6	4	2	0	10	4	+6	10
2	Jorge Wilstermann	6	2	1	3	13	11	+2	5
3	San José	6	2	1	3	6	15	−9	5
4	Always Ready	6	2	0	4	12	13	−1	4

=== Group B ===
Pos	Team	Pld	W	D	L	GF	GA	GD	Pts
1	Aurora	6	3	1	2	10	5	+5	7
2	Deportivo Municipal	6	3	1	2	13	9	+4	7
3	Chaco Petrolero	6	3	1	2	16	17	−1	7
4	Internacional	6	1	1	4	9	17	−8	3

== Quadrangular Final ==
Pos	Team	Pld	W	D	L	GF	GA	GD	Pts
1	Jorge Wilstermann	2	2	0	0	6	4	+2	4
2	Aurora	2	1	0	1	6	3	+3	2
3	Deportivo Municipal	2	1	0	1	7	3	+4	2
4	Bolívar	2	0	0	2	0	9	−9	0

=== Title play-off ===
March 14, 1961
15:00
Relegation play-off

Jorge Wilstermann	3–1	Aurora
Villaroel 10'; Cortez 23'; Sánchez 25'		50' Loma

JFélix Capriles, Cochabamba
Attendance: 10,000
