= 1971 Bolivian Primera División =

Football league season

Bolivian Primera División
- Season: 1971
- Champions: Oriente Petrolero

The 1971 Bolivian Primera División, the first division of Bolivian football (soccer), was played by 12 teams. The champion was Oriente Petrolero.

== National Stage ==
=== Group A ===
Pos	Team	Pld	W	D	L	GF	GA	GD	Pts
1	The Strongest	6	4	1	1	20	9	+11	9
2	Deportivo Municipal	6	4	1	1	10	7	+3	9
3	San José	6	2	0	4	7	13	−6	4
4	Ingenieros	6	1	0	5	11	19	−8	2

=== Group B ===
Pos	Team	Pld	W	D	L	GF	GA	GD	Pts
1	Stormers	6	4	0	2	10	4	+6	8
2	Aurora	6	3	1	2	8	3	+5	7
3	Petrolero	6	3	1	2	5	5	0	7
4	Magisterio	6	1	0	5	4	15	−11	2

=== Group C ===
Pos	Team	Pld	W	D	L	GF	GA	GD	Pts
1	La Bélgica	6	4	2	0	16	4	+12	10
2	Oriente Petrolero	6	3	2	1	13	5	+8	8
3	Universitario de Potosí	6	3	0	3	8	11	−3	6
4	Wilstermann Unificada	6	0	0	6	2	19	−17	0

=== Final Group ===
Pos	Team	Pld	W	D	L	GF	GA	GD	Pts
1	Oriente Petrolero	12	8	1	3	21	12	+9	17
2	Chaco Petrolero	12	6	4	2	27	16	+11	16
3	The Strongest	12	7	2	3	23	15	+8	16
4	La Bélgica	12	5	2	5	19	15	+4	12
5	Deportivo Municipal	12	5	1	6	16	21	−5	11
6	Aurora	12	1	4	7	12	24	−12	6
7	Stormers	12	1	4	7	13	28	−15	6
