= José Carlos Fernández (Bolivian footballer) =

Bolivian footballer (born 1971)

Personal information
- Full name: José Carlos Fernández González
- Date of birth: 24 January 1971 (age 55)
- Place of birth: Santa Cruz de la Sierra, Bolivia
- Height: 1.87 m (6 ft 2 in)
- Position: Goalkeeper

Youth career
- 1987–1994: Tahuichi Academy
- 1992: FIU Golden Panthers

Senior career*
Years	Team	Apps	(Gls)
1995–1996	Oriente Petrolero	6	(0)
1997	Destroyers	20	(0)
1998–1999	Blooming	55	(0)
2000	Córdoba	5	(0)
2000	Jaguares	21	(0)
2001	New England Revolution	7	(0)
2001	Veracruz	14	(0)
2002–2004	Bolívar	74	(0)
2004	Independiente SF	16	(0)
2005	Deportivo Cali	15	(0)
2006	Universidad de Chile	3	(0)
2006	Universitario de Sucre	9	(0)
2007	Deportes Melipilla	22	(0)
2008	José Gálvez	18	(0)
2008	Blooming	13	(0)
2009	Bolívar	8	(0)
2010	Deportivo Italia	11	(0)
2010	Oriente Petrolero	9	(0)
Total		326	(0)

International career^{‡}
1998–2004	Bolivia	26	(0)
- * Club domestic league appearances and goals as of 25 November 2010 ‡ National team caps and goals as of 4 November 2012

José Carlos Fernández González (Spanish pronunciation: [xoˈse ˈkaɾlos feɾˈnandeθ], born 24 January 1971) is a Bolivian retired football goalkeeper who is currently active as director of football of Bolivian club Bolívar.

== Club career ==
=== Early career ===
Fernández developed his football skills at Tahuichi Academy, where he received a full scholarship to go to the United States and play while in college. After he finished school, he pursued a career as a professional goalkeeper.

=== International success at Cali ===
In his home country, Fernández played for important teams such as Oriente Petrolero, Blooming and Bolívar. He also went abroad to play for Córdoba CF in Spain, Jaguares and Veracruz in Mexico, New England Revolution in the MLS, Independiente Santa Fe and Deportivo Cali from Colombia.

== International career ==
He has been capped for the Bolivia national team on 26 occasions, having participated in 1999 Copa América and 2004 among the most important tournaments he took part in. He represented his country in 9 FIFA World Cup qualification matches and at the 1999 Confederations Cup.

== Honours ==
=== Club ===
Blooming

- Primera División (2): 1998, 1999

Bolívar

- Primera División (1): 2002
- Torneo de Apertura (1): 2009

Deportivo Cali

- Torneo Finalización (1): 2005

Oriente Petrolero

- Torneo de Clausura (1): 2010
