= Renato Panay =

Chilean football manager

Personal information
- Full name: Luis Renato Panay Pérez
- Date of birth: 4 November 1922
- Place of birth: Chile
- Place of death: Panama

Managerial career
- Years: Team
- 1948: Emelec
- 1954: Emelec
- 1956: Emelec
- 1957: Rangers
- 1959: San José
- 1960: Rangers
- 1960–1961: Jorge Wilstermann
- 1961: America-RJ
- 1961: Bolivia
- 1963–1964: Aurora
- 1968: Zulia
- 1969–1970: San José
- 1972: Panama (amateur)
- 1974: Panama (amateur)
- 1976–1977: Panama

Luis Renato Panay Pérez (4 November 1922 – unknown), known as Renato Panay, was a Chilean football manager.

== Career ==
=== Club ===
Panay had a prolific career in South America and Panama. In Ecuador, he coached Emelec three times: 1948, 1954, 1956. In 1948 he led the team in the South American Championship of Champions, an older version of Copa Libertadores. In 1956, he won the Campeonato de Fútbol del Guayas, leading a well remembered squad what later was nickanmed Ballet Azul (Blue Ballet).

In Chile, he had two steps with Rangers de Talca in 1957 and 1960.

In Bolivia, he coached San José (1959, 1969–70), Jorge Wilstermann (1960–61), and Aurora (1963–64). Along with San José, he got the 1959 Campeonato Nacional Integrado. With Aurora, he won the 1963 Bolivian Primera División.

In Venezuela, he coached Zulia, becoming the first Chilean manager in the Venezuelan football.

=== National team ===
In 1961 he led the Bolivia national team in the 1962 FIFA World Cup qualifiers versus Uruguay, with a 1-1 draw in La Paz and a 1-2 loss in Montevideo. A month before, he had joined the Brazilian club America-RJ, but he just stayed two days with it.

In the 1970s he emigrated to Panama and coached the national team, becoming one of the five Chileans who have managed it along with Óscar Rendoll Gómez (1946–47/1951–52), Óscar Suman (1949), Néstor Valdés (1969–70) and Hugo Tassara (1972–1973). He led the team in its first FIFA World Cup qualification for the 1978 FIFA World Cup. At the championship, he made his debut with a 3-2 win versus Costa Rica in the Estadio Revolución on 4 April 1976. Previously he had led the national team in both the 1972 Pre-Olympic Tournament and the 1974 Central American and Caribbean Games with amateur squads.

== Personal life ==
After coaching professional teams, he worked for the football academy of AFO in Ecuador in the 1980s.

He made his home and died in Panama.

== Honours ==
Emelec

- Campeonato del Guayas: 1956

San José

- Campeonato Nacional Integrado: 1959

Aurora

- Bolivian Primera División: 1963
