= 1962 Bolivian Primera División =

Bolivian Primera División
- Season: 1962
- Champions: Chaco Petrolero
- Relegated: 1 de Mayo

The 1962 Bolivian Primera División, the first division of Bolivian football (soccer), was played by 8 teams. The champion was Chaco Petrolero.

== League table ==
Pos	Team	Pld	W	D	L	GF	GA	GD	Pts
1	Chaco Petrolero	14	8	3	3	42	30	+12	19
2	The Strongest	14	8	3	3	28	22	+6	19
3	Deportivo Municipal	14	8	2	4	38	26	+12	18
4	31 de Octubre	14	6	4	4	30	22	+8	16
5	Bolívar	14	6	3	5	33	26	+7	15
6	Always Ready	14	6	2	6	36	25	+11	14
7	Mariscal Braun	14	4	3	7	20	28	−8	11
8	1 de Mayo	14	0	0	14	12	60	−48	0

=== Title play-off ===
Chaco Petrolero	3–1	The Strongest

The Strongest	2–2	Chaco Petrolero
