= 1961 Bolivian Primera División =

Bolivian Primera División
- Season: 1961
- Champions: Deportivo Municipal
- Relegated: Lanza

The 1961 Bolivian Primera División, the first division of Bolivian football (soccer), was played by 8 teams. The champion was Deportivo Municipal.

== League table ==
Pos	Team	Pld	W	D	L	GF	GA	GD	Pts
1	Deportivo Municipal	17	10	4	3	44	24	+20	24
2	The Strongest	17	9	3	5	45	25	+20	21
3	Chaco Petrolero	17	9	3	5	39	28	+11	21
4	Bolívar	17	8	2	7	28	30	−2	18
5	1 de Mayo	17	7	4	6	30	34	−4	18
6	Always Ready	17	4	5	8	20	36	−16	13
7	31 de Octubre	17	5	1	11	31	43	−12	11
8	Lanza	17	2	6	9	27	44	−17	10
