= 1955 Bolivian Primera División =

Bolivian Primera División
- Season: 1955
- Champions: San José
- Relegated: Unión Maestranza

The 1955 Bolivian Primera División, the first division of Bolivian football (soccer), was played by 11 teams. The champion was San José.

== Torneo Integrado ==
=== Standings ===
Pos	Team	Pld	W	D	L	GF	GA	GD	Pts
1	San José	20	13	3	4	54	23	+31	29
2	Chaco Petrolero	20	11	2	7	47	45	+2	24
3	Bolívar	20	11	1	8	44	48	−4	23
4	Litoral	20	10	2	8	51	46	+5	22
5	Deportivo Municipal	20	10	1	9	52	31	+21	21
6	Jorge Wilstermann	20	9	3	8	47	45	+2	21
7	The Strongest	20	7	6	7	39	39	0	20
8	Ingavi	20	7	3	10	39	49	−10	17
9	Ferroviario	20	6	4	10	35	46	−11	16
10	Unión Maestranza	20	5	4	11	36	56	−20	14
11	Aurora	20	5	3	12	31	47	−16	13
