= 2006 Liga de Fútbol Profesional Boliviano =

The 2006 Liga de Fútbol Profesional Boliviano or 2006 Segundo Torneo was a professional football tournament in Bolivia that was played to revert the adjustment to the European calendar caused by the 2005 Torneo Adecuación. This tournament was played at the end of the 2005–06 season.

== Teams and venues ==
Team	Location	Venue	Capacity
Aurora	Cochabamba	Estadio Felix Capriles	32,000
Blooming	Santa Cruz de la Sierra	Estadio Ramón Tahuichi Aguilera	38,000
Bolívar	La Paz	Estadio Libertador Simón Bolivar	25,000
Destroyers	Santa Cruz de la Sierra	Estadio Ramón Tahuichi Aguilera	38,000
Jorge Wilstermann	Cochabamba	Felix Capriles	32,000
La Paz	La Paz	Estadio Hernando Siles	42,000
Oriente Petrolero	Santa Cruz de la Sierra	Estadio Tahuichi Aguilera	38,000
Real Potosí	Potosí	Estadio Victor Agustín Ugarte	32,000
San José	Oruro	Estadio Jesús Bermúdez	33,000
The Strongest	La Paz	Estadio Rafael Mendoza	15,000
Universitario de Sucre	Sucre	Estadio Olímpico Patria	32,000
Unión Central	Montero	Estadio Gilberto Parada	15,000

== Group stage ==
Top 3 of each group qualify for final group stage

=== Group 1 ===
Pos	Team	Pld	W	D	L	GF	GA	GD	Pts	Qualification
1	Jorge Wilstermann	12	8	3	1	24	9	+15	27	Final Group
2	Real Potosí	12	5	3	4	20	20	0	18	Final Group
3	Blooming	12	4	3	5	15	18	−3	15	Final Group
4	Destroyers	12	4	1	7	13	19	−6	13	
5	The Strongest	12	3	4	5	10	17	−7	13	
6	La Paz	12	3	3	6	11	15	−4	12	

Updated to match(es) played on 2006. Source:
Rules for classification: 1) points; 2) goal difference; 3) number of goals scored.

=== Group 2 ===
Pos	Team	Pld	W	D	L	GF	GA	GD	Pts	Qualification
1	Bolívar	12	7	2	3	21	12	+9	23	Final Group
2	Oriente Petrolero	12	6	4	2	23	9	+14	22	Final Group
3	Universitario de Sucre	12	6	2	4	19	15	+4	20	Final Group
4	San José	12	3	5	4	12	14	−2	14	
5	Aurora	12	3	3	6	11	19	−8	12	
6	Unión Central	12	2	3	7	6	18	−12	9	

Updated to match(es) played on 2006. Source:
Rules for classification: 1) points; 2) goal difference; 3) number of goals scored.

== Final group ==
Pos	Team	Pld	W	D	L	GF	GA	GD	Pts	Qualification
1	Jorge Wilstermann	10	6	2	2	16	8	+8	21 (Note: Jorge Wilstermann and Bolívar awarded 1 bonus point for winning their respective groups)	2007 Copa Sudamericana First stage
2	Real Potosí	10	5	2	3	20	15	+5	17	2007 Copa Sudamericana First stage
3	Oriente Petrolero	10	3	4	3	13	21	−8	13	
4	Universitario de Sucre	10	3	3	4	12	13	−1	12	
5	Blooming	10	2	5	3	14	15	−1	11	
6	Bolívar	10	1	4	5	15	18	−3	8	

Updated to match(es) played on 2006. Source:
Rules for classification: 1) points; 2) goal difference; 3) number of goals scored.
Notes:

Liga de Fútbol Profesional Boliviano
2006 LFPB champion

4th title

== Topscorers ==
Pos	Name	Team	Goals
1	Cristino Jara	Real Potosí	19
2	Pablo Zeballos	Oriente Petrolero	15
3	Carlos Monteiro	Real Potosí	10
4	Daniel Juárez	Jorge Wilstermann	9
5	Gabriel Viglianti	Bolívar	6
5	Roberto da Silva	Blooming	6
5	Miguel Ángel Cuéllar	Bolívar	6
5	Elvis Marecos	Bolívar	6
5	Martín Menacho	Bolívar	6
5	Horacio Chiorazzo	Jorge Wilstermann	6

== Promotion/relegation play-off ==
=== First leg ===
2006-10-25

Destroyers	1 – 1	Atlético Ciclón
Araúz 81'		Bottaro 77'

=== Second leg ===
2006-10-28

Atlético Ciclón	1 – 2	Destroyers
Bottaro 53'		Ayala 14'; Sampaio 64'

Club Destroyers win 3–2 on aggregate. Club Destroyers remain at the top level.

== See also ==
- Bolivia national football team 2006
