= Saúl Ongaro =

Argentine footballer

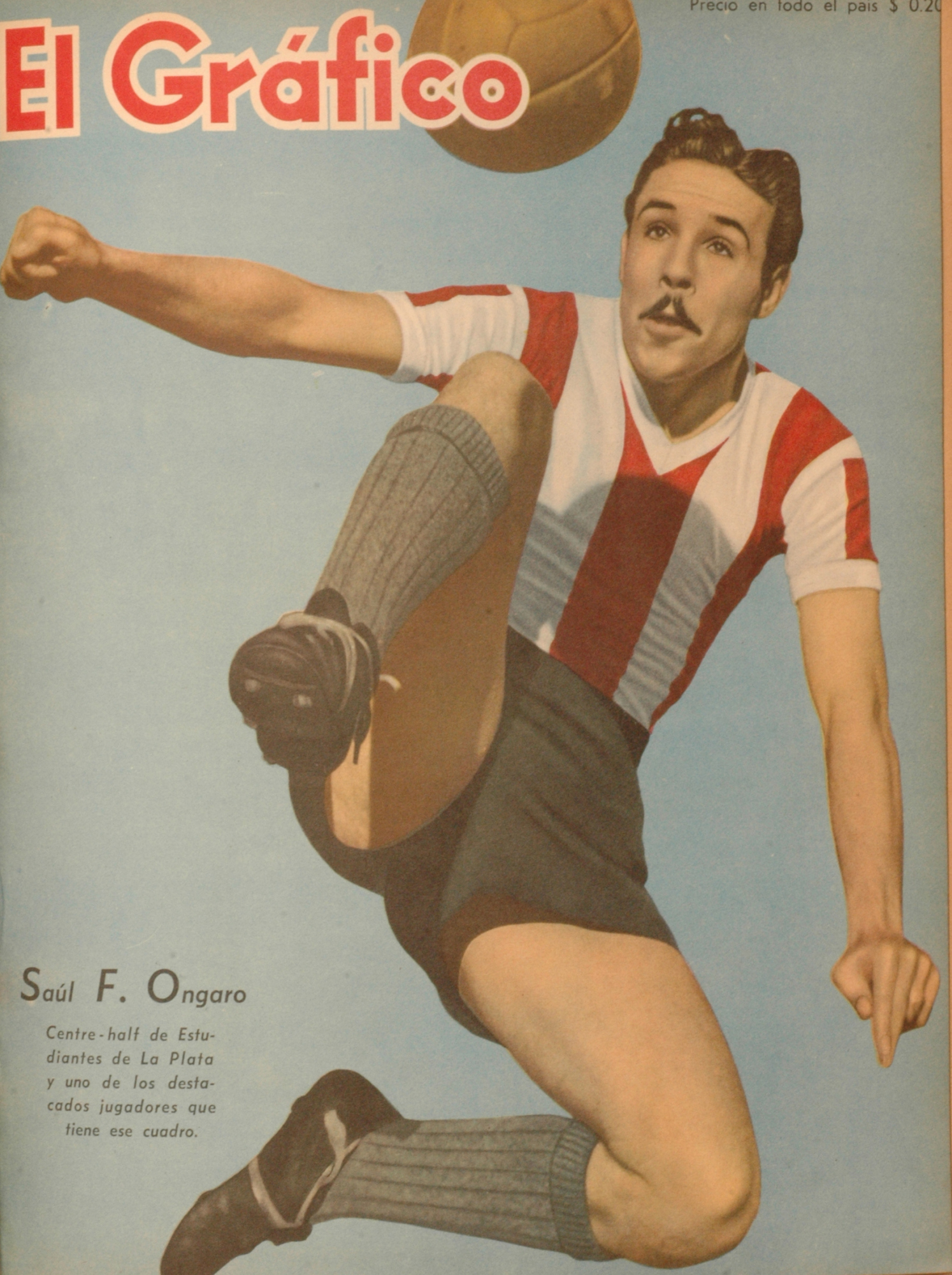
Saúl F. Ongaro

Saúl Fortunato Ongaro (24 August 1916 – 23 April 2004) was an Argentine footballer who played as a defender for clubs in Argentina and Chile. He made two appearances for the Argentina national team in 1946.

== Teams ==
- Estudiantes de La Plata 1937–1938
- Argentino de Quilmes 1939
- Estudiantes de La Plata 1939–1946
- Racing Club 1947–1951
- Universidad de Chile 1951–1952
- Gimnasia y Esgrima de La Plata 1953–1955

== Honours ==
=== As a Player ===
Estudiantes

- Copa Adrián C. Escobar: 1944
- Copa de la República: 1945

Racing

- Argentine Primera División: 1949, 1950, 1951

Argentina

- Copa América: 1946

=== As a Manager ===
Jorge Wilstermann

- Bolivian Primera División: 1958, 1959

Racing

- Argentine Primera División: 1961
