= 1954 Bolivian Primera División =

Bolivian Primera División
- Season: 1954
- Champions: Litoral
- Relegated: Always Ready

The 1954 Bolivian Primera División, the first division of Bolivian football (soccer), was played by 9 teams. The champion was Litoral.

== Torneo Integrado ==
=== Standings ===
Pos	Team	Pld	W	D	L	GF	GA	GD	Pts
1	Litoral	16	8	5	3	40	21	+19	21
2	The Strongest	16	9	3	4	50	37	+13	21
3	Deportivo Municipal	16	8	5	3	40	30	+10	21
4	Ferroviario	16	8	3	5	42	28	+14	19
5	Bolívar	16	6	4	6	38	44	−6	16
6	San José	16	3	8	5	30	33	−3	14
7	Ingavi	16	4	4	8	32	41	−9	12
8	Unión Maestranza	16	3	4	9	37	48	−11	10
9	Always Ready	16	3	4	9	32	49	−17	10
