= 1998 Liga de Fútbol Profesional Boliviano =

Footbal competition

The 1998 season of the Liga de Fútbol Profesional Boliviano was the 41st season of top-tier football in Bolivia.

== Torneo Apertura ==
| Pos | Team | Pld | W | D | L | GF | GA | GD | Pts |
|---|---|---|---|---|---|---|---|---|---|
| 1 | Jorge Wilstermann | 22 | 13 | 6 | 3 | 28 | 11 | +17 | 45 |
| 2 | The Strongest | 22 | 13 | 4 | 5 | 50 | 24 | +26 | 43 |
| 3 | Blooming | 22 | 11 | 4 | 7 | 36 | 32 | +4 | 37 |
| 4 | San José | 22 | 9 | 7 | 6 | 27 | 26 | +1 | 34 |
| 5 | Oriente Petrolero | 22 | 10 | 4 | 8 | 32 | 33 | −1 | 34 |
| 6 | Guabirá | 22 | 9 | 6 | 7 | 30 | 34 | −4 | 33 |
| 7 | Independiente Petrolero | 22 | 9 | 5 | 8 | 29 | 20 | +9 | 32 |
| 8 | Real Potosí | 22 | 8 | 5 | 9 | 34 | 38 | −4 | 29 |
| 9 | Bolívar | 22 | 8 | 4 | 10 | 30 | 29 | +1 | 28 |
| 10 | Real Santa Cruz | 22 | 5 | 6 | 11 | 18 | 30 | −12 | 21 |
| 11 | Destroyers | 22 | 5 | 4 | 13 | 23 | 38 | −15 | 19 |
| 12 | Chaco Petrolero | 22 | 3 | 3 | 16 | 21 | 45 | −24 | 12 |

== Torneo Clausura ==
=== Group A ===
| Pos | Team | Pld | W | D | L | GF | GA | GD | Pts |
|---|---|---|---|---|---|---|---|---|---|
| 1 | Real Santa Cruz | 12 | 5 | 3 | 4 | 20 | 13 | +7 | 18 |
| 2 | Real Potosí | 12 | 5 | 3 | 4 | 20 | 23 | −3 | 18 |
| 3 | San José | 12 | 5 | 2 | 5 | 23 | 20 | +3 | 17 |
| 4 | Oriente Petrolero | 12 | 4 | 4 | 4 | 19 | 18 | +1 | 16 |
| 5 | The Strongest | 12 | 4 | 2 | 6 | 23 | 24 | −1 | 14 |
| 6 | Chaco Petrolero | 12 | 3 | 2 | 7 | 18 | 31 | −13 | 11 |

=== Group B ===
| Pos | Team | Pld | W | D | L | GF | GA | GD | Pts |
|---|---|---|---|---|---|---|---|---|---|
| 1 | Blooming | 12 | 7 | 5 | 0 | 24 | 10 | +14 | 26 |
| 2 | Independiente Petrolero | 12 | 6 | 4 | 2 | 23 | 8 | +15 | 22 |
| 3 | Jorge Wilstermann | 12 | 6 | 2 | 4 | 16 | 15 | +1 | 20 |
| 4 | Bolívar | 12 | 5 | 1 | 6 | 21 | 24 | −3 | 16 |
| 5 | Destroyers | 12 | 5 | 1 | 6 | 21 | 24 | −3 | 16 |
| 6 | Guabirá | 12 | 2 | 4 | 6 | 16 | 24 | −8 | 10 |

== Aggregate table ==
| Pos | Team | Pld | W | D | L | GF | GA | GD | Pts |
|---|---|---|---|---|---|---|---|---|---|
| 1 | Jorge Wilstermann | 34 | 19 | 8 | 7 | 44 | 26 | +18 | 65 |
| 2 | Blooming | 34 | 18 | 9 | 7 | 60 | 42 | +18 | 63 |
| 3 | The Strongest | 34 | 17 | 6 | 11 | 73 | 48 | +25 | 57 |
| 4 | Independiente Petrolero | 34 | 15 | 9 | 10 | 52 | 28 | +24 | 54 |
| 5 | San José | 34 | 14 | 9 | 11 | 52 | 46 | +6 | 51 |
| 6 | Oriente Petrolero | 34 | 14 | 8 | 12 | 51 | 51 | 0 | 50 |
| 7 | Real Potosí | 34 | 13 | 8 | 13 | 54 | 61 | −7 | 47 |
| 8 | Bolívar | 34 | 13 | 5 | 16 | 51 | 53 | −2 | 44 |
| 9 | Guabirá | 34 | 11 | 10 | 13 | 46 | 58 | −12 | 43 |
| 10 | Real Santa Cruz | 34 | 10 | 9 | 15 | 38 | 43 | −5 | 39 |
| 11 | Destroyers | 34 | 8 | 6 | 20 | 41 | 69 | −28 | 30 |
| 12 | Chaco Petrolero | 34 | 6 | 5 | 23 | 39 | 76 | −37 | 23 |

== Final stage ==
| Pos | Team | Pld | W | D | L | GF | GA | GD | Pts |
|---|---|---|---|---|---|---|---|---|---|
| 1 | Blooming | 10 | 7 | 2 | 1 | 16 | 7 | +9 | 23 |
| 2 | Jorge Wilstermann | 10 | 6 | 1 | 3 | 19 | 13 | +6 | 19 |
| 3 | San José | 10 | 4 | 2 | 4 | 16 | 13 | +3 | 14 |
| 4 | Independiente Petrolero | 10 | 4 | 1 | 5 | 13 | 13 | 0 | 13 |
| 5 | Real Potosí | 10 | 3 | 2 | 5 | 20 | 20 | 0 | 11 |
| 6 | Real Santa Cruz | 10 | 1 | 2 | 7 | 6 | 24 | −18 | 5 |

== Play-offs ==
=== Championship ===
First Leg
9 December 1998

| Blooming | 3 – 0 | Jorge Wilstermann |
|---|---|---|
| Menacho 23', 63'; Tufiño 80' (pen.) |

Estadio Tahuichi, Santa Cruz
Second Leg
13 December 1998

| Jorge Wilstermann | 0 – 1 | Blooming |
|---|---|---|
| | | Blanco 87' |

Estadio Félix Capriles, Cochabamba
Blooming won the title and qualified for the Copa Libertadores 1999, alongside Jorge Wilstermann.

=== Promotion/relegation ===
First Leg

| Pompeya | 1 – 0 | Destroyers |

Second Leg

| Destroyers | 4 – 0 | Pompeya |

Destroyers remain at first level; Unión Central from Tarija won promotion

== Title ==
Liga de Fútbol Profesional Boliviano
1998 champion
Blooming
2nd title
