= Club Deportivo Litoral =

Club Deportivo Litoral may refer to:

- Club Deportivo Litoral (Cochabamba)
- Club Deportivo Litoral (La Paz)
