= 1990 Liga de Fútbol Profesional Boliviano =

Bolivian Primera División
- Season: 1990
- Champions: Oriente Petrolero
- 1991 Copa Libertadores: Bolívar; Oriente Petrolero

The 1990 Bolivian Primera División, the first division of Bolivian football (soccer), was played by 13 teams. The champion was Oriente Petrolero.

== Torneo Apertura ==
=== First Stage ===
==== Serie A ====
- Bolívar and San José received two extra points for not having an inter-series rival.
- Litoral and Always Ready (both La Paz) did not participate in the Apertura.

Pos	Team	Pld	W	D	L	GF	GA	GD	Pts	Qualification
1	Bolívar	12	8	2	2	33	15	+18	20	Second Stage
2	Oriente Petrolero	14	7	4	3	16	18	−2	18	Second Stage
3	San José	12	5	4	3	19	12	+7	16	Second Stage
4	Jorge Wilstermann	14	7	0	7	21	21	0	14	Second Stage
5	Ciclón	14	5	1	8	17	25	−8	11	
6	Real Santa Cruz	14	3	4	7	10	23	−13	10	

==== Serie B ====
Pos	Team	Pld	W	D	L	GF	GA	GD	Pts	Qualification
1	The Strongest	12	5	3	4	23	16	+7	13	Second Stage
2	Blooming	12	4	5	3	21	20	+1	13	Second Stage
3	Independiente Petrolero	12	6	1	5	13	13	0	13	Second Stage
4	Destroyers	12	3	4	5	17	27	−10	10	Second Stage
5	San Pedro	12	2	2	8	13	13	0	6	

=== Second Stage ===
==== Serie A ====
Pos	Team	Pld	W	D	L	GF	GA	GD	Pts	Qualification
1	Bolívar	6	4	1	1	15	3	+12	9	Semifinals
2	Oriente Petrolero	6	3	1	2	8	5	+3	7	Semifinals
3	Independiente Petrolero	6	1	3	2	5	11	−6	5	
4	Destroyers	6	1	1	4	2	11	−9	3	

==== Serie B ====
Pos	Team	Pld	W	D	L	GF	GA	GD	Pts	Qualification
1	San José	6	4	0	2	5	3	+2	8	Semifinals
2	Blooming	6	3	1	2	6	5	+1	7	Semifinals
3	The Strongest	6	3	0	3	6	5	+1	6	
4	Jorge Wilstermann	6	1	1	4	3	7	−4	3	

=== Semifinals ===
==== First leg ====
Bolívar	2–1	Blooming

San José	1–1	Oriente Petrolero

==== Second leg ====
Blooming	1–0	Bolívar

Oriente Petrolero	2–0	San José

=== Finals ===
==== First leg ====
Oriente Petrolero	2–1	Bolívar

==== Second leg ====
Bolívar	2–0	Oriente Petrolero

==== Extra match ====
Oriente Petrolero	1–0	Bolívar

== Torneo Clausura ==
=== First Stage ===
==== Serie A ====
Pos	Team	Pld	W	D	L	GF	GA	GD	Pts	Qualification
1	Oriente Petrolero	6	3	2	1	10	6	+4	10	Second Stage
2	Blooming	6	1	5	0	8	6	+2	9	Second Stage
3	Real Santa Cruz	6	2	2	2	6	7	−1	7	Second Stage
4	Destroyers	6	0	3	3	5	10	−5	5	

==== Serie B ====
Pos	Team	Pld	W	D	L	GF	GA	GD	Pts	Qualification
1	The Strongest	6	5	1	0	10	0	+10	13	Second Stage
2	Bolívar	6	3	1	2	14	5	+9	9	Second Stage
3	Litoral	6	1	1	4	2	11	−9	3	
4	Always Ready	6	1	1	4	3	13	−10	3	

==== Serie C ====
Pos	Team	Pld	W	D	L	GF	GA	GD	Pts	Qualification
1	Ciclón	8	4	3	1	11	7	+4	12	Second Stage
2	San José	8	3	2	3	12	11	+1	10	Second Stage
3	Independiente Petrolero	8	3	2	3	11	11	0	10	Second Stage
4	Jorge Wilstermann	8	2	4	2	10	10	0	10	
5	San Pedro	8	2	1	5	5	10	−5	6	

=== Second Stage ===
==== Serie A ====
Pos	Team	Pld	W	D	L	GF	GA	GD	Pts	Qualification
1	Bolívar	6	2	4	0	9	4	+5	8	Semifinals
2	San José	6	2	3	1	9	5	+4	7	Semifinals
3	Real Santa Cruz	6	1	3	2	9	13	−4	5	
4	Blooming	6	1	2	3	5	10	−5	4	

==== Serie B ====
Pos	Team	Pld	W	D	L	GF	GA	GD	Pts	Qualification
1	Oriente Petrolero	6	4	1	1	12	6	+6	9	Semifinals
2	The Strongest	6	2	3	1	10	10	0	7	Semifinals
3	Independiente Petrolero	6	2	1	3	8	9	−1	5	
4	Ciclón	6	1	1	4	7	12	−5	3	

=== Semifinals ===
==== First leg ====
Bolívar	2–1	The Strongest

Oriente Petrolero	3–0	San José

==== Second leg ====
The Strongest	3–4	Bolívar

San José	0–3	Oriente Petrolero

=== Finals ===
==== First leg ====
Bolívar	4–1	Oriente Petrolero

==== Second leg ====
Oriente Petrolero	2–1	Bolívar

==== Extra match ====
Oriente Petrolero	1–1	Bolívar
Penalties
	4–3
