= 2001 Liga de Fútbol Profesional Boliviano =

The 2001 season of the Liga de Fútbol Profesional Boliviano was the 44th season of top-tier football in Bolivia.

== Torneo Apertura ==
Pos	Team	Pld	W	D	L	GF	GA	GD	Pts
1	Bolívar	22	12	6	4	53	28	+25	42 (Note: Bolívar won the title in the Torneo Apertura after a 1-0 win in the play-off against Oriente Petrolero on 27 June 2001 in Cochabamba. The only goal was scored by international Marco Sandy.)
2	Oriente Petrolero	22	13	3	6	48	31	+17	42
3	Blooming	22	9	9	4	34	25	+9	36
4	The Strongest	22	10	4	8	42	34	+8	34
5	Jorge Wilstermann	22	8	9	5	40	36	+4	33
6	Real Potosí	22	8	7	7	33	34	−1	31
7	Unión Central	22	9	3	10	27	34	−7	30
8	Independiente Petrolero	22	7	6	9	29	39	−10	27
9	Mariscal Braun	22	6	6	10	31	36	−5	24
10	Guabirá	22	6	5	11	25	35	−10	23
11	Iberoamericana	22	5	5	12	37	47	−10	20
12	Real Santa Cruz	22	5	5	12	23	43	−20	20

== Torneo Clausura ==
=== First stage ===
==== Group 1 ====
Pos	Team	Pld	W	D	L	GF	GA	GD	Pts
1	Bolívar	12	7	4	1	32	16	+16	25
2	Jorge Wilstermann	12	5	3	4	19	19	0	18
3	Mariscal Braun	12	4	3	5	19	22	−3	15
4	Real Santa Cruz	12	4	3	5	12	16	−4	15
5	Independiente Petrolero	12	3	5	4	16	24	−8	14
6	Blooming	12	4	1	7	15	20	−5	13

==== Group 2 ====
Pos	Team	Pld	W	D	L	GF	GA	GD	Pts
1	The Strongest	12	6	5	1	26	12	+14	23
2	Real Potosí	12	6	2	4	28	22	+6	20
3	Oriente Petrolero	12	4	4	4	22	16	+6	16
4	Guabirá	12	4	4	4	15	22	−7	16
5	Iberoamericana	12	4	3	5	22	23	−1	15
6	Unión Central	12	1	3	8	17	31	−14	6

=== Second stage ===
==== Group 1 ====
Pos	Team	Pld	W	D	L	GF	GA	GD	Pts
1	Oriente Petrolero	6	4	0	2	16	9	+7	12
2	Jorge Wilstermann	6	4	0	2	16	9	+7	12
3	The Strongest	6	2	1	3	7	11	−4	7
4	Independiente Petrolero	6	1	1	4	6	15	−9	4

==== Group 2 ====
Pos	Team	Pld	W	D	L	GF	GA	GD	Pts
1	Bolívar	6	4	0	2	15	7	+8	12
2	Real Potosí	6	3	1	2	12	11	+1	10
3	Mariscal Braun	6	3	0	3	9	9	0	9
4	Guabirá	6	1	1	4	7	16	−9	4

=== Semifinals ===
Pos	Team	Pld	W	D	L	GF	GA	GD	Pts
1	Oriente Petrolero	6	4	1	1	14	9	+5	13
2	Real Potosí (Note: Real Potosí qualified for the Copa Libertadores 2002)	6	2	2	2	13	15	−2	8
3	Bolívar	6	1	3	2	8	9	−1	6
4	Jorge Wilstermann	6	1	2	3	7	9	−2	5

=== Championship play-off ===
First Leg
12 December 2001

Bolivar	4 – 1	Oriente Petrolero
Botero; Chiorazzo		González

Estadio Libertador Simón Bolivar, La Paz
Second Leg
16 December 2001

Oriente Petrolero	4 – 3	Bolivar
Castillo		Liberman; Ferreira; Botero

Estadio Tahuichi Aguilera, Santa Cruz
Third Leg
19 December 2001

Oriente Petrolero	2 – 0	Bolivar
Castillo

Estadio Félix Capriles, Cochabamba

== Title ==
Liga de Fútbol Profesional Boliviano
2001 champion
Oriente Petrolero
3rd title

== See also ==
- Bolivia national football team 2001
