= 1952 Bolivian Primera División =

Bolivian Primera División
- Season: 1952
- Champions: The Strongest
- Relegated: Northern

The 1952 Bolivian Primera División, the first division of Bolivian football (soccer), was played by 8 teams, all hailing from La Paz and played their matches at the Hernando Siles Stadium. The champion was The Strongest.

== Torneo Interdepartamental ==
=== Standings ===
Pos	Team	Pld	W	D	L	GF	GA	GD	Pts
1	The Strongest	14	8	2	4	32	26	+6	18
2	Always Ready	14	6	5	3	34	24	+10	17
3	Ingavi	14	6	5	3	31	35	−4	17
4	Bolívar	14	7	2	5	46	25	+21	16
5	Litoral	14	5	4	5	35	31	+4	14
6	Unión Maestranza	14	5	3	6	21	28	−7	13
7	Ferroviario	14	4	2	8	23	35	−12	10
8	Northern	14	2	3	9	25	43	−18	7

Source: https://historiadelfutbolboliviano.com/2020/05/07/las-tablas-de-los-campeonatos-nacionales-1950-1976/
