= José Bustamante (footballer, born 1921) =

Bolivian footballer

Personal information
- Full name: José Bustamante Nava
- Date of birth: 5 March 1921 or 1922
- Place of birth: Padilla, Bolivia
- Height: 1.67 m (5 ft 5 1/2 in)
- Position: Defender

Senior career*
Years	Team	Apps	(Gls)
- Club Deportivo Litoral

International career
1946–1953	Bolivia	29	(0)
- * Club domestic league appearances and goals

José Bustamante Nava (born 5 March 1921 or 1922, date of death unknown) was a Bolivian football defender.

== Career ==
Bustamante played for Bolivia in the 1950 FIFA World Cup. He earned a total of 29 caps, scoring no goals between 1946 and 1953. He also played for Club Litoral.

Bustamante is deceased.
