= 2002 Liga de Fútbol Profesional Boliviano =

The 2002 season of the Liga de Fútbol Profesional Boliviano was the 45th season of top-tier football in Bolivia.

== Torneo Apertura ==
Pos	Team	Pld	W	D	L	GF	GA	GD	Pts
1	Bolívar	22	16	1	5	56	23	+33	49
2	The Strongest	22	13	3	6	37	23	+14	42
3	Oriente Petrolero	22	12	3	7	61	35	+26	39
4	Blooming	22	12	1	9	43	45	−2	37
5	Jorge Wilstermann	22	10	5	7	46	35	+11	35
6	Universidad Iberoamericana	22	10	2	10	33	32	+1	32
7	Unión Central	22	8	5	9	29	34	−5	29
8	Real Potosí	22	8	4	10	46	50	−4	28
9	Guabirá	22	8	4	10	23	44	−21	28
10	Independiente Petrolero	22	6	5	11	26	43	−17	23
11	San José	22	6	4	12	35	40	−5	22
12	Mariscal Braun	22	3	3	16	17	48	−31	12

== Torneo Clausura ==
Pos	Team	Pld	W	D	L	GF	GA	GD	Pts
1	Bolívar	22	15	5	2	70	16	+54	50
2	Oriente Petrolero	22	13	4	5	59	32	+27	43
3	The Strongest	22	10	6	6	46	26	+20	36
4	Real Potosí	22	10	4	8	46	40	+6	34
5	Jorge Wilstermann	22	8	7	7	34	35	−1	31
6	Universidad Iberoamericana	22	9	2	11	30	38	−8	29
7	Blooming	22	10	2	10	40	53	−13	32
8	San José	22	8	5	9	32	47	−15	29
9	Guabirá	22	6	5	11	25	45	−20	23
10	Unión Central	22	5	7	10	28	42	−14	22
11	Independiente Petrolero	22	4	8	10	26	39	−13	20
12	Mariscal Braun	19	5	3	11	21	44	−23	18

== Aggregate table ==
Pos	Team	Pld	W	D	L	GF	GA	GD	Pts
1	Bolívar	44	31	6	7	126	39	+87	99
2	Oriente Petrolero	44	25	7	12	120	67	+53	82
3	The Strongest	44	23	9	12	83	49	+34	78
4	Jorge Wilstermann	44	18	12	14	80	70	+10	66
5	Blooming	44	22	3	19	83	98	−15	69
6	Real Potosí	44	18	8	18	92	90	+2	62
7	Universidad Iberoamericana	44	19	4	21	63	70	−7	61
8	Unión Central	44	13	12	19	57	76	−19	51
9	San José	44	14	9	21	67	87	−20	51
10	Guabirá	44	14	9	21	48	89	−41	51
11	Independiente Petrolero	44	10	13	21	52	82	−30	43
12	Mariscal Braun	44	8	6	30	38	92	−54	27

== Play-offs ==
=== Second place ===
First Leg
3 December 2002

Oriente Petrolero	1 – 0	The Strongest
Paz 76'

Estadio Tahuichi Aguilera, Santa Cruz
Second Leg
5 December 2002

The Strongest	2 – 1	Oriente Petrolero
Coelho 11'; Méndez 57'		Paz 77'

Estadio Rafael Mendoza, La Paz
Third Leg
8 December 2002

The Strongest	0 – 0	Oriente Petrolero
Penalties
	1 – 3

Estadio Felix Capriles, Cochabamba

=== Promotion/relegation ===
First Leg
8 December 2002

Independiente Petrolero	0 – 0	Fancesa

Estadio Olímpico Patria, Sucre
Second Leg
15 December 2002

Fancesa	0 – 2	Independiente Petrolero
		Grass; Carballo (o.g.)

Estadio Olímpico Patria, Sucre

== Title ==
Liga de Fútbol Profesional Boliviano
2002 champion

12th title

== Topscorers ==
Pos	Name	Team	Goals
1	Joaquín Botero	Bolívar	49
2	José Alfredo Castillo	Oriente Petrolero	46
3	Cristian Reynaldo	Real Potosí	31

== See also ==
- Bolivia national football team 2002
