= Carlos Aragonés =

Bolivian football midfielder (born 1956)

Personal information
- Full name: Carlos Aragonés Espinoza
- Date of birth: 16 February 1956 (age 70)
- Place of birth: Yacuiba, Tarija, Bolivia
- Height: 1.81 m (5 ft 11 1/2 in)
- Position: Midfielder

Senior career*
Years	Team	Apps	(Gls)
1976–1980	Bolívar	109	(64)
1981–1984	Palmeiras	12	(0)
1984–1985	Coritiba	6	(0)
1985	Destroyers	16	(6)

International career
1977–1981	Bolivia	31	(15)

Managerial career
- 1989–1990: Blooming
- 1991: Real Santa Cruz
- 1992–1993: The Strongest
- 1993–1997: Bolivia (assistant coach)
- 1997–1999: Blooming
- 2000–2001: Bolivia
- 2003: Blooming
- 2004: Oriente Petrolero
- 2005–2006: Bolívar
- 2010–2011: Blooming
- * Club domestic league appearances and goals

Carlos Aragonés Espinoza (born 16 February 1956), nicknamed "Aragonez" in Brazil, is a former Bolivian football (soccer) midfielder, who is Bolivia national team's third-placed all-time goalscorer. He played for several top-level clubs of Bolivia and Brazil. Aragonés was the Bolivia national team head coach in 2001. The last team he managed at club level was Blooming until February 2011.

== Playing career ==
=== Club ===
Born in Santa Cruz de la Sierra, he started his career in 1976, defending Bolívar, where he was part of the squad that won the Bolivian league in 1976 and in 1978, Aragonés moved to Brazil in 1981 to play for Palmeiras. He stayed in the club until 1984, playing 113 games before leaving. Carlos Aragonés moved to Coritiba in 1984, playing six more Série A games without scoring a goal. He returned to Bolivia in 1985 and joined Destroyers. While playing for the canarios, he suffered a serious knee injury that put an end to his football career.

=== International ===
He played 31 games for the Bolivia national team between 1977 and 1981, scoring 15 goals, including two against Brazil in the 1979 Copa América. He is the third-placed Bolivia national team's all-time goalscorer. He represented his country in 12 FIFA World Cup qualification matches.

== Managerial career ==
Carlos Aragonés was hired as the Bolivia national team manager in 2000, but he resigned after the unsuccessful campaign at the 2001 Copa América.

At club level he has managed Bolivian clubs Real Santa Cruz, The Strongest, Blooming, Oriente Petrolero and Bolívar.

Between 2006 and 2009, Aragonés was Erwin Sánchez's coaching staff coordinator for the Bolivia national team.

== Honours ==
=== Player ===
Bolívar

- Bolivian Primera División: 1978
- Copa Bolivia: 1979

Coritiba

- Campeonato Brasileiro Série A: 1985

=== Manager ===
==== Club ====
The Strongest

- Liga de Fútbol Profesional Boliviano: 1993

Blooming

- Liga de Fútbol Profesional Boliviano: 1998, 1999

Bolívar

- Liga de Fútbol Profesional Boliviano: 2006 Clausura
