= 1951 Bolivian Primera División =

Bolivian Primera División
- Season: 1951
- Champions: Always Ready
- Relegated: La Paz

The 1951 Bolivian Primera División, the first division of Bolivian football (soccer), was played by 8 teams. The champion was Always Ready.

A total of 8 teams played, 1 down from 1950 as Northern was relegated and none was promoted. All teams hailed from La Paz and played at the Hernando Siles stadium

== Torneo Interdepartamental ==
=== Standings ===
Pos	Team	Pld	W	D	L	GF	GA	GD	Pts
1	Always Ready	14	8	5	1	45	23	+22	21
2	Bolívar	14	8	4	2	37	19	+18	20
3	Ferroviario	14	5	3	6	25	23	+2	13
4	Ingavi	14	5	3	6	26	34	−8	13
5	The Strongest	14	5	3	6	19	29	−10	13
6	Litoral	14	4	4	6	20	23	−3	12
7	Unión Maestranza	14	3	4	7	21	34	−13	10
8	La Paz	14	3	4	7	16	24	−8	10

Source: https://historiadelfutbolboliviano.com/2020/05/07/las-tablas-de-los-campeonatos-nacionales-1950-1976/

=== Relegation play-off ===
Unión Maestranza	2–1	La Paz

Unión Maestranza	6–1	La Paz
