= 1950 Bolivian Primera División =

Bolivian Primera División
- Season: 1950
- Champions: Bolívar
- Relegated: Northern

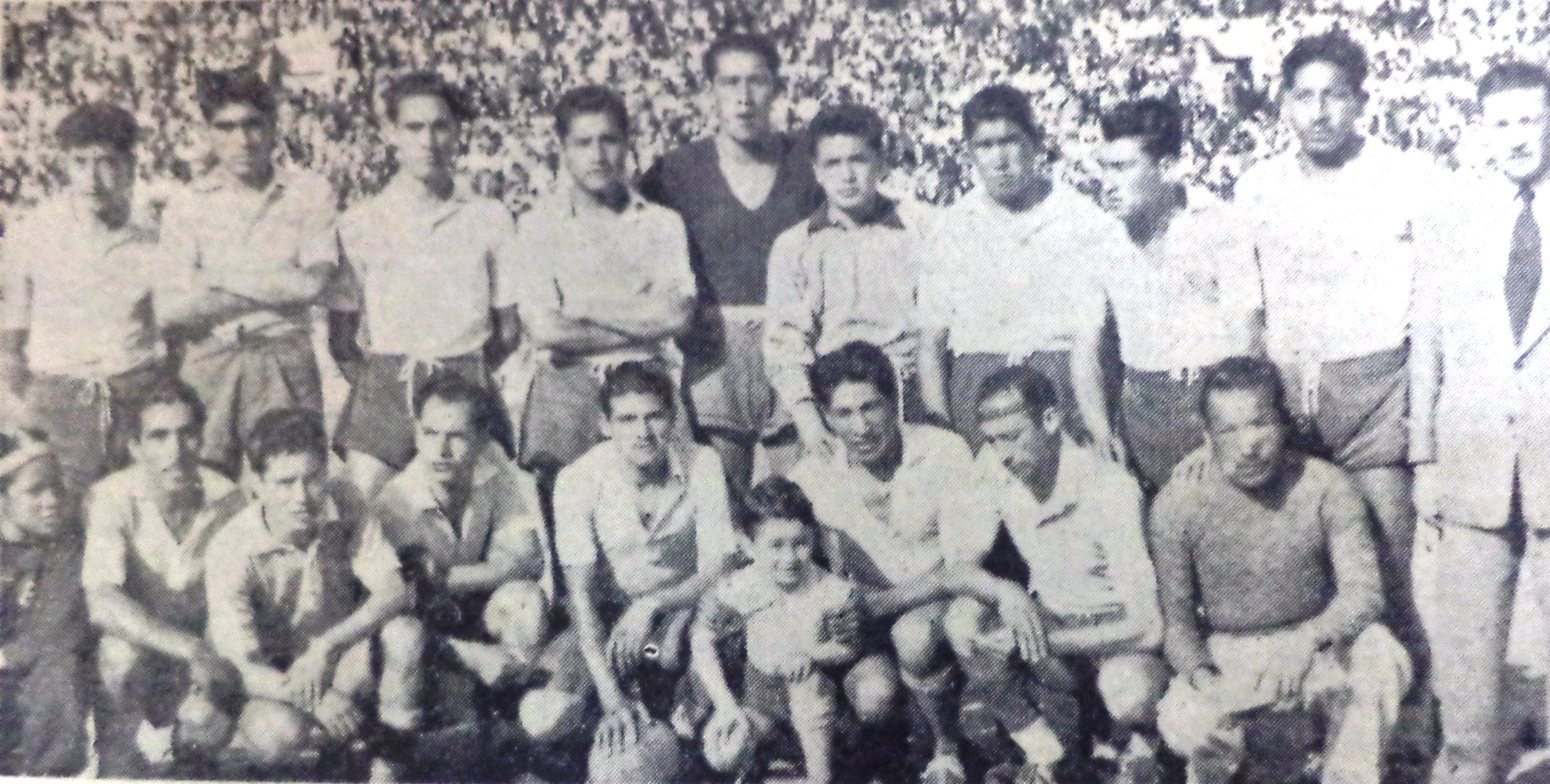

The 1950 Bolivian Primera División, the first division of Bolivian football (soccer), was played by 9 teams. The champion was Bolívar. It was the first season after the La Paz Football Association turned its first division professional. All 9 teams were from La Paz and played their matches on the Hernando Siles Stadium

== Torneo Interdepartamental ==
=== Standings ===
Pos	Team	Pld	W	D	L	GF	GA	GD	Pts
1	Bolívar	16	8	5	3	40	32	+8	21
2	Litoral	16	8	5	3	48	31	+17	21
3	Unión Maestranza	16	8	3	5	41	26	+15	19
4	La Paz	16	4	9	3	27	24	+3	17
5	Ferroviario	16	6	3	7	32	30	+2	15
6	The Strongest	16	5	5	6	29	40	−11	15
7	Always Ready	16	4	5	7	29	36	−7	13
8	Ingavi	16	5	2	9	33	46	−13	12
9	Northern	16	3	5	8	24	38	−14	11

Source: https://historiadelfutbolboliviano.com/2020/05/07/las-tablas-de-los-campeonatos-nacionales-1950-1976/

=== Title play-off ===
Bolívar	3–0	Litoral
