= 2003 Liga de Fútbol Profesional Boliviano =

Liga de Fútbol Profesional Boliviano
- Season: 2003
- Champions: The Strongest
- 2004 Copa Libertadores: The Strongest; Bolívar; Jorge Wilstermann
- 2004 Copa Sudamericana: Bolívar; Aurora
- Matches: 132
- Goals: 433 (3.28 per match)

The 2003 Liga de Fútbol Profesional Boliviano season had 12 teams in competition. The Strongest won the championship.

== Results ==
=== Standings ===
Pos	Team	Pld	W	D	L	GF	GA	GD	Pts
1	The Strongest	22	13	7	2	43	29	+14	46
2	Bolívar	22	13	6	3	54	21	+33	45
3	Jorge Wilstermann	22	11	7	4	43	19	+24	40
4	Oriente Petrolero	22	10	3	9	51	37	+14	33
5	Real Potosí	22	8	7	7	44	40	+4	31
6	Universidad Iberoamericana	22	9	3	10	35	40	−5	30
7	San José	22	7	4	11	29	34	−5	25
8	Aurora	22	6	7	9	35	43	−8	25
9	Unión Central	22	5	10	7	26	39	−13	25
10	Blooming	22	6	6	10	31	38	−7	24
11	Guabirá	22	4	6	12	21	44	−23	18
11	Independiente Petrolero	22	4	6	12	21	49	−28	18

Updated to match(es) played on 2003. Source: Soccerway
Rules for classification: 1) points; 2) goal difference; 3) number of goals scored.
