= Martín Palavicini =

Argentine footballer

Personal information
- Full name: Martín Adrian Palavicini López
- Date of birth: August 15, 1977 (age 49)
- Place of birth: Rosario, Santa Fe, Argentina
- Height: 1.77 m (5 ft 10 in)
- Position: Striker

Team information
- Current team: Universitario de Sucre
- Number: 11

Senior career*
Years	Team	Apps	(Gls)
2004	Real Santa Cruz	7	(8)
2005–2007	Oriente Petrolero	97	(22)
2008–2009	San José	48	(12)
2010–2011	Real Mamoré	34	(3)
2011–2013	Petrolero	18	(6)
2013–	Universitario de Sucre	115	(61)
- * Club domestic league appearances and goals as of 7 May 2015

Martín Adrián Palavicini (born August 15, 1977, in Rosario, Santa Fe) is an Argentine football striker currently playing for Universitario de Sucre in the Liga de Fútbol Profesional Boliviano.

In 2004, Palavicini made his professional debut in Bolivia with modest club Real Santa Cruz. Subsequently, he transferred to Oriente Petrolero, where he played until 2007. The following year he joined another Bolivian club, San José. In 2010 signing for the club Real Mamoré. In July 2011 after the team was relegated he signed for club Petrolero. In July 2013 he transferred to Universitario de Sucre. Palavicini finished as the topscorer in the 2015 Clausura tournament with 13 goals.
