= 2004 Liga de Fútbol Profesional Boliviano =

Liga de Fútbol Profesional Boliviano
- Season: 2004
- Champions: Bolívar
- 2005 Copa Libertadores: Bolívar; The Strongest; Oriente Petrolero
- 2005 Copa Sudamericana: Bolívar; The Strongest
- Matches played: 132
- Goals scored: 424 (3.21 per match)

The 2004 Liga de Fútbol Profesional Boliviano (Professional Football League of Bolivia) season had 12 teams in competition. Club Bolívar won the championship.

== Results ==
Pos	Team	Pld	W	D	L	GF	GA	GD	Pts
1	Bolívar	22	17	2	3	51	21	+30	53
2	Aurora	22	11	5	6	42	32	+10	38
3	Jorge Wilstermann	22	11	3	8	40	28	+12	36
4	Real Potosí	22	10	3	9	43	38	+5	33
5	San José	22	9	5	8	35	36	−1	32
6	Oriente Petrolero	22	8	7	7	43	38	+5	31
7	La Paz	22	9	4	9	33	38	−5	31
8	Unión Central	22	8	6	8	27	29	−2	30
9	Real Santa Cruz	22	7	5	10	28	40	−12	26
10	The Strongest	22	7	3	12	31	31	0	24
11	Blooming	22	5	4	13	28	52	−24	19
12	Universidad Iberoamericana	22	5	3	14	23	41	−18	18

Note: The season is divided into Torneo Apertura and Torneo Clausura, played in different formats. The above table is only for the Torneo Apertura; information for the Torneo Clausura is missing.
