= 1953 Bolivian Primera División =

Bolivian Primera División
- Season: 1953
- Champions: Bolívar
- Relegated: Árabe

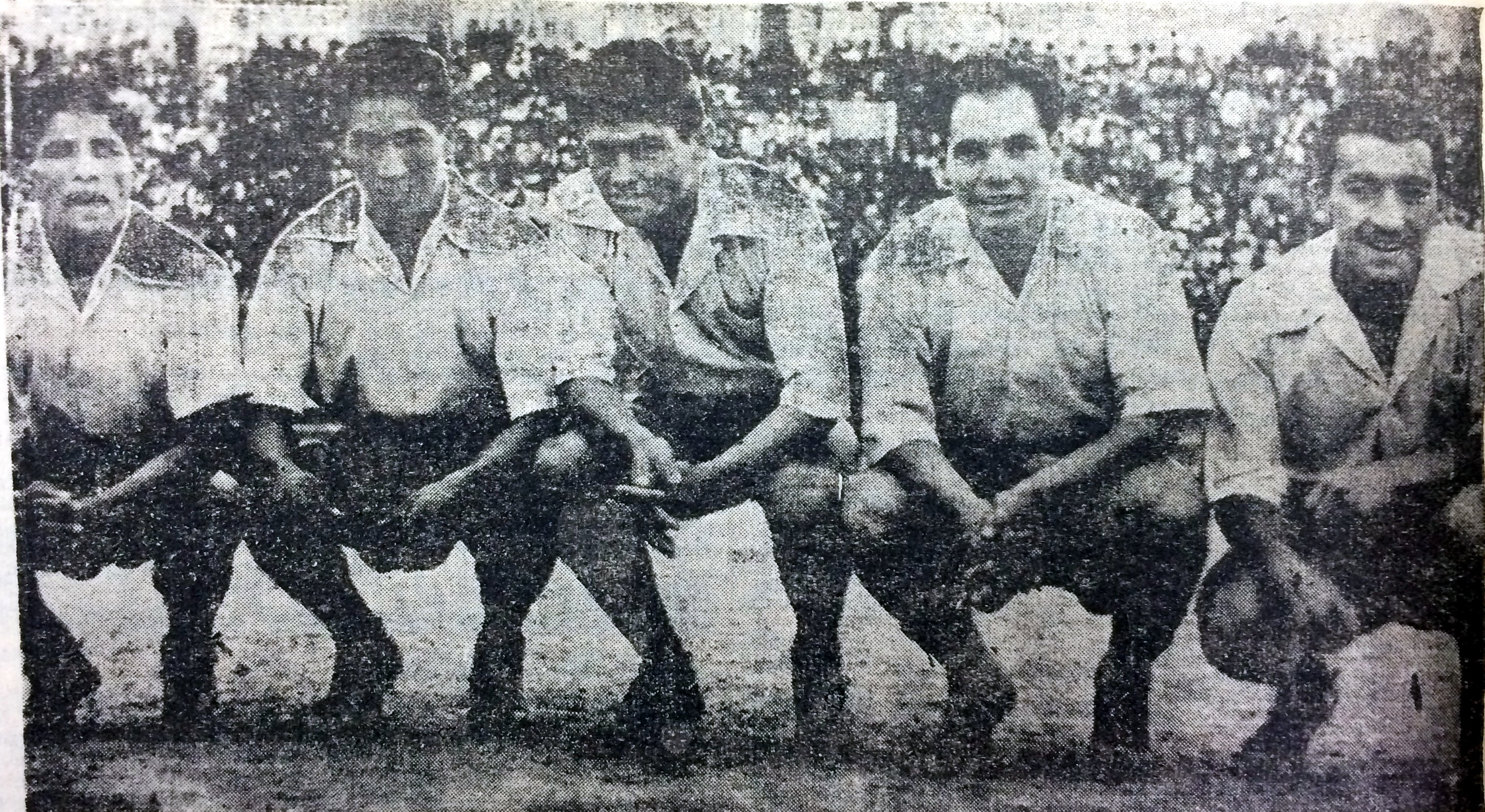

The 1953 Bolivian Primera División, the first division of Bolivian football (soccer), was played by 8 teams. The champion was Bolívar.

== Torneo Interdepartamental ==
=== Standings ===
Pos	Team	Pld	W	D	L	GF	GA	GD	Pts
1	Bolívar	14	11	3	0	40	16	+24	25
2	Always Ready	14	7	3	4	32	21	+11	17
3	Ingavi	14	4	6	4	33	32	+1	14
4	Ferroviario	14	5	3	6	32	28	+4	13
5	Litoral	14	5	2	7	21	22	−1	12
6	Unión Maestranza	14	5	2	7	21	32	−11	12
7	The Strongest	14	3	4	7	26	38	−12	10
8	Árabe	14	3	3	8	25	31	−6	9
