= 2005 Liga de Fútbol Profesional Boliviano =

Liga de Fútbol Profesional Boliviano
- Season: 2005
- Champions: Bolívar
- 2006 Copa Libertadores: Bolívar; The Strongest; Oriente Petrolero
- 2006 Copa Sudamericana: Bolívar
- Matches played: 132
- Goals scored: 411 (3.11 per match)

The 2005 Liga de Fútbol Profesional Boliviano or the Torneo Adecuación was the 47th season of top-flight football in Bolivia.

The purpose of the tournament was to adjust to the European calendar, which traditionally runs from August to May. Thus, this tournament was played from March to July 2005 to make way for the 2005–06 season to start in August 2005. The Torneo Adecuación champions were Bolívar. No relegation took place.

== Standings ==
Pos	Team	Pld	W	D	L	GF	GA	GD	Pts	Qualification
1	Bolívar	22	13	5	4	55	20	+35	44	2006 Copa Libertadores Group stage
2	The Strongest	22	13	4	5	45	19	+26	43	2006 Copa Libertadores Group stage
3	Oriente Petrolero	22	12	5	5	39	27	+12	41	2006 Copa Libertadores First stage
4	Aurora	22	10	5	7	37	32	+5	35	
5	Blooming	22	11	2	9	27	37	−10	35	
6	Jorge Wilstermann	22	10	4	8	34	24	+10	34	
7	La Paz	22	10	3	9	35	33	+2	33	
8	San José	22	8	6	8	48	36	+12	30	
9	Real Potosí	22	7	6	9	31	42	−11	27	
10	Destroyers	22	6	3	13	29	54	−25	21	
11	Unión Central	22	5	4	13	20	42	−22	19	
12	Universidad Iberoamericana	22	1	5	16	11	45	−34	8	

Source: rsssf.com
