= 1963 Bolivian Primera División =

Bolivian Primera División
- Season: 1963
- Champions: Aurora

The 1963 Bolivian Primera División, the first division of Bolivian football (soccer), was played by 8 teams. The champion was Aurora.

== Major tournament of the Republic ==
Pos	Team	Pld	W	D	L	GF	GA	GD	Pts
1	Aurora	0	0	0	0	0	0	0	0
2	Jorge Wilstermann	0	0	0	0	0	0	0	0
3	San José	0	0	0	0	0	0	0	0
4	Bata	0	0	0	0	0	0	0	0
5	Racing de Llallagua	0	0	0	0	0	0	0	0
