= Abdúl Aramayo =

Bolivian footballer (1934–2020)

Personal information
- Date of birth: 4 September 1934
- Date of death: 2 September 2020 (aged 86)
- Place of death: La Paz, Bolivia
- Position: Midfielder

Senior career*
Years	Team	Apps	(Gls)
- Ferroviario La Paz
1954–1964	Chaco Petrolero		
1965–1967	Bolívar		
1968	The Strongest		

International career
1959–1963	Bolivia	10	(0)

Managerial career
- Bolívar
Medal record
Representing Bolivia
Copa América
Winner	1963 Bolivia
- * Club domestic league appearances and goals

Abdúl Aramayo (4 September 1934 – 2 September 2020) was a Bolivian footballer who played as a midfielder. He was part of Bolivia's squad that won the 1963 South American Championship on home soil.

== International career ==
Aramayo was part of Bolivia's squad for the 1959 South American Championship in Argentina.

He played five games during the tournament, the game against Argentina on 11 March being his first cap with Bolivia.

During the game against Brazil on 21 March, Argentinian journalists, who came to see Garrincha, were so impressed by Aramayo's performance that they nicknamed him the "Bolivian Garrincha".

His sixth cap was on 15 July 1961 against Uruguay for the 1962 FIFA World Cup qualification.

Aramayo was again selected in Bolivia's squad for the 1963 South American Championship and played four games during the tournament as Bolivia won the competition on home soil, its first and only Copa America to date.

During the tournament, the game against Paraguay on 24 March was his last cap with Bolivia.
