= Moisés Barack =

Peruvian footballer and manager (1943–2024)

Personal information
- Full name: Moisés Barack Caycho
- Date of birth: 26 December 1943
- Place of birth: Ica, Peru
- Date of death: 9 April 2024 (aged 80)
- Place of death: Lima, Peru
- Position: Defender

Senior career*
Years	Team	Apps	(Gls)
1959	Juventud Gloria		
1960	Centro Iqueño		
1961–1965	Universitario		
1965–?	Centro Iqueño		
?	Octavio Espinosa		
?–1971	Porvenir Miraflores		

Managerial career
- 1973: Deportivo SIMA
- 1974: Unión Huaral
- 1974: Sport Boys
- 1975–1976: Deportivo Municipal
- 1976–1977: Unión Huaral
- 1978: Atlético Chalaco
- 1979: Atlético Torino
- 1980: Juventud La Palma
- 1980: Unión Huaral
- 1981: Coronel Bolognesi
- 1982–1983: Atlético Torino
- 1984–1985: Peru
- 1986: Club Bolívar
- 1988: Alianza Lima
- 1989–1991: The Strongest
- 1992: Club Bolívar
- 1993: Deportivo Sipesa
- 1994: Sport Boys
- 1995: Alfonso Ugarte (Chiclín)
- 1996: Deportivo Municipal
- 1996: José Gálvez FBC
- 1997: FBC Melgar
- 1999–2000: Estudiantes de Medicina
- 2001: Deportivo Wanka
- 2002–2004: CNI
- 2005: Atlético Chalaco
- 2006: Unión Huaral
- 2007: UTC
- 2007: Sport Boys
- 2009: José María Arguedas
- 2009: Deportivo Garcilaso
- 2011: Pacífico FC
- 2013: Sport Huancayo
- * Club domestic league appearances and goals

Moisés Barack Caycho (Ica, 26 December 1943 – Lima, 9 April 2024) was a Peruvian football player and manager.

Nicknamed Moshé, he was the coach of Peru between 1984 and 1985 and managed numerous clubs in his native country as well as in Bolivia.

== Playing career ==
Playing as a defender, Moisés Barack made his debut in the second division in 1959 with Juventud Gloria. But he became well-known in the 1960s, first at Centro Iqueño, then at Universitario de Deportes, the club where he played from 1961 to 1965 and with which he won the championship in 1964.

== Managerial career ==
Having become a coach, Moisés Barack made a big splash by winning his first title in Peru, the 1976 championship, with a modest provincial club: Unión Huaral. In 1984, he took charge of the Peruvian national team for the 1986 World Cup qualifiers. Sacked on 10 June 1985, the day after a goalless draw at home against Colombia, he learned the news in a radio studio from a journalist who was about to give him an interview. He was replaced by Roberto Chale.

Barack then went into exile in Bolivia where he enjoyed a golden period managing two clubs in La Paz: Club Bolívar (champions in 1985 and 1991) and The Strongest (champions in 1989).

His return to Peru was not particularly memorable, and aside from a Copa Perú title won in 1996 with José Gálvez FBC, his career was largely scattered, involving coaching second-tier clubs. In 2006, he relegated Unión Huaral, the club he had led to the title in 1976, to the second division. He returned to the first division with Sport Huancayo in 2013, after a six-year absence from the top flight, but was incredibly dismissed after the first matchday of the 2013 season.

== Death ==
Barack died on 9 April 2024, at the age of 80.

== Honours ==
=== Player ===
Universitario de Deportes

- Peruvian Primera División: 1964

=== Manager ===
Unión Huaral

- Torneo Descentralizado: 1976

Club Bolívar

- Liga de Fútbol profesional (2): 1985, 1991

The Strongest

- Liga de Fútbol profesional: 1989

Atlético Torino

- Copa Perú: 1982

José Gálvez FBC

- Copa Perú: 1996
