= Víctor Hugo Antelo =

Bolivian footballer (born 1964)

Personal information
- Full name: Víctor Hugo Antelo Bárba
- Date of birth: 2 November 1964 (age 61)
- Place of birth: Santa Cruz de la Sierra, Bolivia
- Height: 1.77 m (5 ft 10 in)
- Position: Striker

Youth career
- 1980–1982: Universidad

Senior career*
| Years | Team | Apps | (Gls) |
| 1983–1988 | Oriente Petrolero | 221 | (144) |
| 1989 | Real Santa Cruz | 31 | (22) |
| 1990 | Blooming | 11 | (5) |
| 1990 | Fujita Kogyo | 26 | (19) |
| 1991 | Blooming | 29 | (16) |
| 1992 | Bolivar | 16 | (3) |
| 1993 | San José | 33 | (20) |
| 1994 | Bolivar | 28 | (12) |
| 1995 | Real Santa Cruz | 26 | (8) |
| 1996 | The Strongest | 36 | (14) |
| 1997–2000 | Blooming | 123 | (106) |
| 2001 | Real Santa Cruz | | |
| Total | | 580 | (369) |

International career
| 1985–1999 | Bolivia | 11 | (2) |

Managerial career
- 2001–2002: Oriente Petrolero
- 2002–2003: Blooming
- 2004: The Strongest
- 2004: Destroyers
- 2005–2006: Oriente Petrolero
- 2007: Bolivar
- 2008: Guabirá
- 2008–2009: Oriente Petrolero
- 2011: Destroyers
- 2013: Aurora
- 2014–2015: Sport Boys Warnes
- 2016–2018: Guabirá
- 2019: Sport Boys Warnes
- 2021–2022: Guabirá
- 2022: Blooming
- 2024: Oriente Petrolero
- * Club domestic league appearances and goals

Víctor Hugo Antelo Bárba (born 2 November 1964) is a Bolivian football manager and former player who played as a striker.

Antelo the all-time topscorer in the Bolivian League with 350 goals scored in 18 seasons. In 2000, he was named the world's active most prolific top division goalscorer with 343 goals in 429 league matches.

== Club career ==
Nicknamed Tucho, Santa Cruz de la Sierra-born Antelo began playing for amateur club Universidad. In 1983, he jumped to professional football when he signed for Oriente Petrolero at age 18. During his professional career he also played for Blooming, Real Santa Cruz, Bolivar, The Strongest, and San José. Although he spent most of his career in Bolivia, he made a short spell in Japanese football with Fujita Kogyo in 1990.

Among his achievements, he has won the title of topscorer in the Liga de Fútbol Profesional Boliviano in 7 different occasions. Between May 17 and September 6, 1998 Antelo scored 18 goals in 12 consecutive matches, braking the record for most consecutive games finding the net, previously set by Juan Carlos Sánchez, who coincidentally comes behind Antelo in the list of all-time topscorers. In addition, he has scored a total of 21 goals in 46 Copa Libertadores matches.

== International career ==
Despite proving his natural talent as a topscorer, Antelo was rarely considered by Bolivia national team managers throughout his career and was overlooked for the 1994 FIFA World Cup. He only earned 11 caps for Bolivia netting 2 goals.

== Managerial career ==
After retiring as a player in 2000, "Tucho" pursued a coaching career. The following year, he took over Oriente Petrolero and had a successful season. As result, the club obtained its third national championship, the first in eleven years. Later, Antelo managed other first division clubs; among them, Blooming, The Strongest, Bolivar, Guabirá, Destroyers, Aurora and most recently Sport Boys Warnes; however, he wasn't able to match the success once achieved with Oriente.

== Career statistics ==
International goals
| No. | Date | Venue | Opponent | Score | Result | Competition |
|---|---|---|---|---|---|---|
| 1. | 25.01.1993 | Madras, India | (Russia) FC Lokomotiv Moscow | 1–2 | Loss | Friendly match |
| 2. | 28.04.1999 | Cochabamba, Bolivia | Chile | 1–1 | Draw | Friendly match |

== Honours ==
=== Player ===
Bolívar

- Liga de Fútbol Profesional Boliviano: 1992, 1994

Blooming

- Liga de Fútbol Profesional Boliviano: 1998, 1999

=== Manager ===
Oriente Petrolero

- Liga de Fútbol Profesional Boliviano: 2001

=== Individual ===
- Liga de Fútbol Profesional Boliviano Top scorer: 1984 (38 goals), 1985 (37 goals), 1989 (22 goals), 1993 (20 goals), 1997 (24 goals), 1998 (31 goals), 1999 (31 goals)
