= Néstor Valdés =

Chilean footballer and manager (1936–2021)

Personal information
- Full name: Néstor Valdés Moraga
- Date of birth: 23 May 1936
- Place of birth: Chile
- Date of death: 3 February 2021 (aged 84)
- Place of death: Chile

Youth career
- Colo-Colo

Senior career*
Years	Team	Apps	(Gls)
- Colo-Colo
- → Deportes Concepción (loan)

International career
- Chile

Managerial career
- 1968: San Antonio Unido
- 1969–1970: Panama
- 1971: Suchitepéquez
- 1972–1973: Aurora
- 1973: Guatemala
- 1974: Alianza
- 1977: Guatemala
- 1979: Colo-Colo (assistant)
- 1980: Regional Atacama
- 1983: Deportes Valdivia
- * Club domestic league appearances and goals

Néstor Valdés Moraga (23 May 1936 – 3 February 2021), sometimes referred as Néstor Valdez, was a Chilean football player and manager.

== Career ==
Born in 1936, as a football player, Valdés was with Colo-Colo in the 1950s, becoming the team captain. His playing career stopped due to a serious inguinal injury. He also played for Deportes Concepción on loan.

At international level, he took part of the Chile national team.

Turned a football manager, he began his career with San Antonio Unido in the 1968 season. He emigrated to Panama and coached the Panama national team from 1969 to 1970, taking part in the 1969 CONCACAF Championship. He became one of the five Chileans who have managed the Panama national team along with Óscar Rendoll Gómez (1946–47/1951–52), Óscar Suman (1949), Hugo Tassara (1972–1973) and Renato Panay (1976–1977).

From 1971 to 1973 he worked in Guatemala, coaching both Suchitepéquez and Aurora at club level and the Guatemala national team in the 1973 CONCACAF Championship. In 1974 he coached Alianza in El Salvador. On 15 December 1977, he coached Guatemala again in a 1–1 draw versus Honduras.

Back in Chile, he was the assistant of Pedro Morales in Colo-Colo at the 1979 Primera División de Chile, where they became champions, and also was the first coach of Deportes Valdivia in 1983.

After his retirement, he was in charge of the Colo-Colo academies until 2002.

== Personal life ==
Valdés was distinguished as an Honorary Member of Colo-Colo.

He was President of Viejos Cracks de Colo-Colo (Old Stars), an association of former players.
