= Jesús Reynaldo =

Bolivian footballer (born 1954)

Personal information
- Date of birth: 22 May 1954 (age 72)
- Position: Forward

International career
Years	Team	Apps	(Gls)
1979–1981	Bolivia	5	(2)

Jesús Reynaldo (born 22 May 1954) is a Bolivian footballer who played as a forward. He played in five matches for the Bolivia national football team between 1979 and 1981, scoring two goals. He was also part of Bolivia's squad for the 1979 Copa América tournament.
