= Cala Cala =

Coordinates: 17.4853°S 67.5147°W

Cala Cala Qala Qala
- Town
- Interactive map of Cala Cala
- Country: Bolivia
- Department: La Paz Department
- Province: Aroma Province
- Municipality: Sica Sica Municipality
- Time zone: UTC-4 (BOT)

Cala Cala (in hispanicized spelling) or Qala Qala (Aymara qala stone, "a complex of stones") is a small town in Bolivia. In 2010 it had an estimated population of 2,073. it is known for the historic rock paintings.
