= 2005–06 Liga de Fútbol Profesional Boliviano =

The 2005–06 Liga de Fútbol Profesional Boliviano was the first Bolivian football league to use the European calendar format. However, it was quickly changed after issues with relegation occurring in the middle of the season instead of the end.

== Torneo Apertura ==
The first part of the season was divided into two groups. The top three of each group advanced to a final group stage known as the Hexagonal Final.

=== Serie A ===
Pos	Team	Pld	W	D	L	GF	GA	GD	Pts	Qualification
1	Blooming	12	8	2	2	34	13	+21	26	To Hexagonal Final
2	San José	12	7	1	4	22	17	+5	22	To Hexagonal Final
3	The Strongest	12	6	3	3	22	10	+12	21	To Hexagonal Final
4	Jorge Wilstermann	12	5	2	5	21	13	+8	17	
5	Destroyers	12	5	1	6	26	26	0	16	
6	Universidad Iberoamericana	12	0	0	12	6	52	−46	0	

=== Serie B ===
Pos	Team	Pld	W	D	L	GF	GA	GD	Pts	Qualification
1	Bolívar	12	9	3	0	32	13	+19	30	To Hexagonal Final
2	La Paz	12	5	4	3	17	15	+2	19	To Hexagonal Final
3	Oriente Petrolero	12	5	3	4	15	17	−2	18	To Hexagonal Final
4	Real Potosí	12	2	6	4	20	19	+1	12	
5	Aurora	12	2	4	6	11	15	−4	10	
6	Unión Central	12	3	1	8	14	30	−16	10	

=== Hexagonal final ===
Pos	Team	Pld	W	D	L	GF	GA	GD	Pts	Qualification
1	Blooming	10	6	1	3	20	20	0	19	2007 Copa Libertadores
2	Bolívar	10	5	2	3	22	17	+5	14	2006 Copa Sudamericana
3	Oriente Petrolero	10	4	1	5	11	16	−5	13	
4	La Paz	10	3	3	4	17	14	+3	12	
5	The Strongest	10	3	3	4	14	18	−4	12	
6	San José	10	2	4	4	12	11	+1	10	

== Promotion/relegation ==
Due to issues with the second division and changing to the European season format, a relegation was held in the middle of the season between the Apertura and Clausura. Universidad Iberoamericana was relegated and Destroyers played a promotion relegation playoff against Guabirá. Universitario was promoted to the Torneo Clausura.

== Torneo Clausura ==
Pos	Team	Pld	W	D	L	GF	GA	GD	Pts	Qualification
1	Bolívar	22	14	6	2	40	17	+23	48	2007 Copa Libertadores Second Stage
2	Real Potosí	22	13	6	3	54	25	+29	45	2007 Copa Libertadores First Stage
3	Universitario de Sucre	22	12	6	4	38	30	+8	42	
4	San José	22	10	8	4	34	20	+14	38	
5	Blooming	22	10	5	7	33	31	+2	35	
6	Oriente Petrolero	22	7	8	7	30	41	−11	29	
7	Jorge Wilstermann	22	6	8	8	38	35	+3	26	
8	The Strongest	22	7	4	11	32	36	−4	25	
9	Unión Central	22	6	3	13	28	39	−11	21	
10	Destroyers	22	6	2	14	30	50	−20	20	
11	Aurora	22	3	8	11	22	40	−18	17	
12	La Paz	22	3	6	13	24	42	−18	15	

Updated to match(es) played on 2006. Source:
Rules for classification: 1) points; 2) goal difference; 3) number of goals scored.

=== Topscorers ===
Pos	Name	Team	Goals
1	Cristino Jara	Real Potosí	16
2	José Alfredo Castillo	Oriente Petrolero	13
3	Carlos Monteiro	Real Potosí	11
4	Martín Menacho	Bolívar	10
5	Gualberto Mojica	Blooming	9
	Juan Daniel Salaberry	Universitario de Sucre	9
