= José Alfredo Castillo =

Bolivian footballer (born 1983)

Personal information
- Full name: José Alfredo Castillo Parada
- Date of birth: February 9, 1983 (age 43)
- Place of birth: Santa Cruz de la Sierra, Bolivia
- Height: 1.82 m (6 ft 0 in)
- Position: Forward

Youth career
- 1991–2000: Academia Tahuichi

Senior career*
Years	Team	Apps	(Gls)
2000–2002	Oriente Petrolero	111	(92)
2002–2004	Tecos	32	(13)
2004	→ Bolívar (loan)	13	(8)
2004–2009	Tecos	24	(5)
2006	→ Rosario Central (loan)	3	(0)
2006	Tecos A	10	(2)
2007	→ Oriente Petrolero (loan)	16	(4)
2007	→ O'Higgins (loan)	15	(0)
2008	→ Bolívar (loan)	2	(1)
2008	→ Atlético Mineiro (loan)	20	(3)
2009	→ Oriente Petrolero (loan)	7	(3)
2009	→ South China (loan)	0	(0)
2010	→ Blooming (loan)	44	(26)
2011	Tecos	6	(0)
2011–2012	→ Bolívar (loan)	16	(2)
2012–2013	Oriente Petrolero	18	(5)
2013–2014	Guabirá	41	(17)
2014–2015	Sport Boys Warnes	27	(10)
2015–2016	Oriente Petrolero	25	(5)
2016–2017	Guabirá	18	(13)
2017	Sport Boys Warnes	15	(8)
2017–2018	Guabirá	60	(34)
2019–2021	Oriente Petrolero	76	(31)
2022	Real Santa Cruz	2	(0)
2022	Wilstermann	12	(1)
2023	Libertad Gran Mamoré	5	(0)
2023	Oriente Petrolero	4	(0)

International career
2001	Bolivia U20	3	(2)
2001–2011	Bolivia	24	(6)
- * Club domestic league appearances and goals

José Alfredo Castillo Parada (born February 9, 1983) is a Bolivian former football attacker.

== Club career ==
In 1991, he enrolled in the Tahuichi academy.

In 2002, he scored 42 league goals for Oriente Petrolero, and RSSSF indicated he was the highest league goalscorer in the world that year.

Abroad, Castillo played for Tecos in Mexico, Rosario Central in Argentina, O'Higgins in Chile, Atlético Mineiro in Brazil and South China in Hong Kong.

His last clubs were Libertad Gran Mamoré and Oriente Petrolero in 2023. According to the IFFHS, he was the highest goalscoring Bolivian player in top divisions in the 21st century (293), and the fifth-highest South American, only behind players like Luis Suárez (409) and Lionel Messi (518).

== International career ==
Castillo has been capped for the Bolivia national team 24 times, scoring a total of 6 goals in international competitions.

== Career statistics ==
=== International ===
Appearances and goals by national team and year
National team	Year	Apps	Goals
Bolivia	2001	4	1
Bolivia	2002	3	0
Bolivia	2003	4	0
Bolivia	2004	2	1
Bolivia	2005	6	4
Bolivia	2009	2	0
Bolivia	2010	1	0
Bolivia	2011	2	0
Total		24	6

Scores and results list Bolivia's goal tally first, score column indicates score after each Castillo goal.

List of international goals scored by José Alfredo Castillo
No.	Date	Venue	Opponent	Score	Result	Competition	Ref.
1	14 November 2001	Estadio Monumental, Lima, Peru	Peru	1–1	1–1	2002 FIFA World Cup qualification	
2	5 June 2004	Atahualpa Olympic Stadium, Quito, Ecuador	Ecuador	2–3	2–3	2006 FIFA World Cup qualification	
3	26 March 2005	Hernando Siles Stadium, La Paz, Bolivia	Argentina	1–0	1–2	2006 FIFA World Cup qualification	
4	29 March 2005	Hernando Siles Stadium, La Paz, Bolivia	Venezuela	2–0	3–1	2006 FIFA World Cup qualification	
5	4 June 2005	Estadio Nacional, Santiago, Chile	Chile	1–3	1–3	2006 FIFA World Cup qualification	
6	9 October 2005	Estadio Nacional Julio Martínez Prádanos	Brazil	1–1	1–1	2006 FIFA World Cup qualification	
