= Universitario de La Paz =

Bolivian football club

La «U»
- Full name: Universitario de La Paz
- Nickname(s): El Equipo Estudiantil
- Founded: 22 September 1922
- Ground: Estadio Hernando Siles
- Capacity: 42,000
- League: Liga de Fútbol Profesional Boliviano

Club Universitario de La Paz is a professional football team based in La Paz Department, Bolivia that competes in the Bolivian Primera División.

== Honours ==
=== National ===
- Bolivian Primera División
  - Winners (1): 1969

=== Regional ===
- Campeonato Paceño
  - Winners (1): 1929
- Campeonato de 2.ª Categoría
  - Winners (2): 2014, 2019
