= Club Deportivo Litoral (La Paz) =

Bolivian football club

Litoral
- Full name: Club Deportivo Litoral
- Nicknames: Tricolor; El equipo de la Policía
- Founded: March 23, 1932; 94 years ago
- Ground: Estadio Hernando Siles, La Paz
- Capacity: 42,000
- League: La Paz Regional League
Home colors	Away colors

Club Deportivo Litoral, commonly known as Club Litoral or as just Litoral, is a Bolivian football club based in La Paz. The team plays in La Paz Football Association, the regionalised third division of Bolivian football league system.

The only participation of Litoral in international football came in 1948 when the squad competed in the South American Championship of Champions, the first wide–continental tournament of South American football.

== History ==
A group of workers of Soligno factory in La Paz founded the club on 23 March 1932, but the Chaco War postponed club's activities until 1936, when Litoral returned to competitions, playing friendly matches at Estadio Hernando Siles under the name "Deportivo Saboya", which was then changed to "Club Deportivo Calama".

In 1938 the name was changed to "Club Deportivo y Cultural Litoral" commemorating the region tamed by Chile during the War of the Pacific. As most of the club's founders were Italian, the colors adopted for the squad jersey were red, white and green.

In 1948, Litoral was one of the seven clubs that contested the first wide-continental competition in South America, the South American Championship of Champions won by Vasco da Gama. Litoral finished in the sixth place out of seven clubs, with forward Roberto Caparelli being the top scorer of the tournament.

== Stadium ==
Club Litoral play their home games at Estadio Hernando Siles. The stadium has a maximum capacity of 42,000 people.

== Honours ==
=== National ===
- Bolivian Primera División
  - Winners (1): 1954

=== Regional ===
- Campeonato Paceño
  - Winners (8): 1947, 1948, 1949, 1954, 1972, 1983, 1991, 2001
- Campeonato de 2.ª Categoría
  - Winners (1): 2005
