= Estadio Félix Capriles =

Stadium in Cochabamba, Bolivia

Estadio Sudamericano Félix Capriles
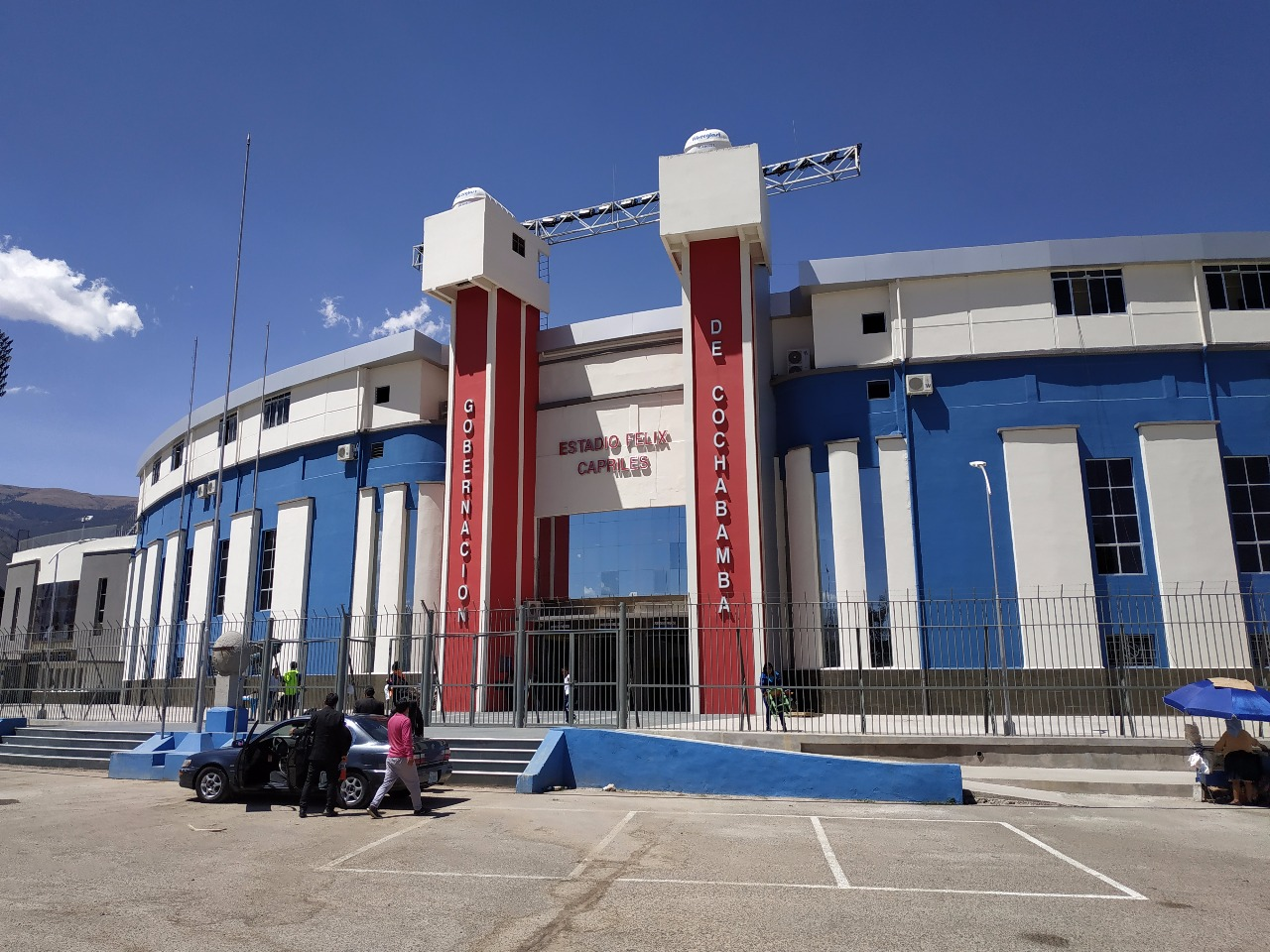
- Interactive map of Estadio Sudamericano Félix Capriles
- Coordinates: 17.3793°S 66.1618°W
- Elevation: 2,567 m (8,422 ft)
- Capacity: 32,100; 28,220 (international)
- Surface: grass
- Field size: 105 x 68 m

Construction
- Opened: 1938
- Renovated: 1997, 2018
- Expanded: 1992
- Architect: Jose Villavicencio
- Project manager: Felix Capriles Sainz

Tenants
- Club Jorge Wilstermann; Club Aurora; Club Enrique Happ; Club Litoral

The Estadio Sudamericano Félix Capriles is a multi-purpose stadium in Cochabamba, Bolivia. It is currently used mostly for football matches, and has a maximum capacity of 32,100. It is the home stadium of Club Jorge Wilstermann and Club Aurora. It is also used for bigger concerts, political rallies, and other public events held in the city of Cochabamba. It is located at 2,567 meters (8,422 feet) above sea level.

== History ==
The stadium was opened in 1938. On 31 March 1963, Bolivia defeated Brazil 5–4 to win their first Copa America title at this stadium.

The stadium was used during the 1997 Copa América.

In 2017, it underwent a renovation to prepare for the 2018 South American Games.
