= Club 31 de Octubre =

Bolivian football club

31 de Octubre
- Full name: Club Deportivo 31 de Octubre
- Founded: 1954
- Ground: Estadio Hernando Siles; La Paz, Bolivia
- Capacity: 42,000
- League: Liga de Fútbol Profesional Boliviano
Home colours

Club 31 de Octubre is a Bolivian football club based in La Paz. Founded on 21 November 1954, it currently plays in Liga de Fútbol Profesional Boliviano, holding home games at Estadio Hernando Siles, with a 42,000-seat capacity.

== History ==
The club was founded on 21 November 1954 as Club 31 de Octubre, and participated in the 1967 Copa Libertadores.

== Honours ==
=== National ===
- Campeonato experimental (2nd tier)
  - Winners (1): 1979

=== Regional ===
- Campeonato Paceño
  - Winners (3): 1975, 1977, 1978
- Campeonato de 2.ª Categoría
  - Winners (1): 2008

== Performance in CONMEBOL competitions ==
- Copa Libertadores: 1 appearance

1967 – First Round
