= Mariscal Santa Cruz =

Bolivian football club

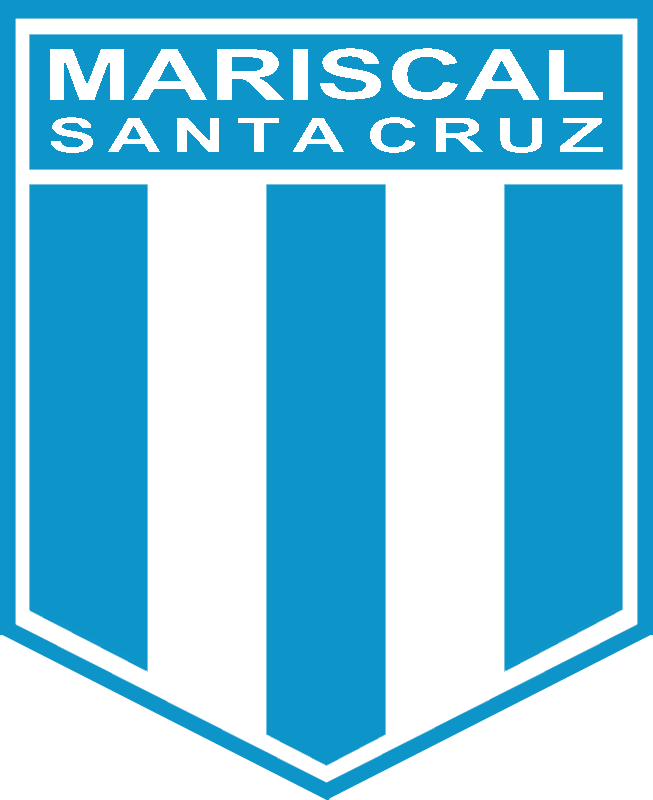
- Full name: Club Mariscal Santa Cruz
- Nickname: Club Cardinal
- Founded: 1923
- Dissolved: 1976
- Ground: Estadio La Paz; La Paz, Bolivia
- Capacity: 30,000
- League: Liga Paceña
- 1976: Liga Paceña, 3rd
Home colours	Away colours

Club Mariscal Santa Cruz, was a Bolivian football club based in the city of La Paz, Bolivia, named in honour of Andrés de Santa Cruz, former President of Peru and Bolivia.

It was founded in 1923 as Northern Football Club, but was renamed in 1965 as Club Mariscal Santa Cruz in honor of Marshal Andrés de Santa Cruz, former president of the Peru–Bolivian Confederation (Peru and Bolivia), when the club was sold to the Armed Forces of Bolivia due to financial difficulties.
