= Club Deportivo Litoral (Cochabamba) =

Bolivian football club

Litoral
- Full name: Club Deportivo Litoral de Cochabamba
- Founded: 5 April 1936
- Ground: Estadio Félix Capriles, Cochabamba, Bolivia
- Capacity: 32,000
- League: Cochabamba Regional League
Home colors	Away colors

Club Deportivo Litoral, commonly known as Club Litoral or as just Litoral, is a Bolivian football club based in Cochabamba. The team plays in Cochabamba Football Association, the regionalised third division of Bolivian football league system.

The only participation of Litoral in international football came in 1969 when the squad competed in the Copa Libertadores.

== History ==
Litoral's only appearance to continental competition was in 1969 when the club played the Copa Libertadores although they were eliminated in the first stage.

== Stadium ==
Club Litoral play their home games at Estadio Félix Capriles. The stadium has a maximum capacity of 32,000 people.
