= Chaco Petrolero =

Bolivian football club

- Full name: Club Deportivo Chaco Petrolero
- Nickname(s): Los Guerreros; Chaquito; Conjunto Albiverde
- Founded: 1944
- Ground: Estadio Hernando Siles; La Paz, Bolivia
- Capacity: 42,000
- Chairman: Yecid Angel Gonzalvez Yujra
- Manager: Yvan Laura
- League: Copa Simón Bolívar; Primera A AFLP
- 2023 2023: Copa Simón Bolívar, 27th of 40; Primera A AFLP, 3rd of 14
| Home colours | Away colours |

Club Deportivo Chaco Petrolero is a Bolivian football club based in La Paz. Founded on 20 October 1944, it currently plays in Bolivian Football Regional Leagues, holding home games at Estadio Hernando Siles, with a 42,000-seat capacity.

== History ==
The club was founded in 1944 as Club Deportivo Chaco Petrolero, and participated in the 1971 and 1972 Copa Libertadores.

== Honours ==
=== National ===
- Bolivian Primera División
  - Winners (1): 1970

=== Regional ===
- Campeonato Paceño
  - Winners (9): 1955, 1962, 1981, 1987, 1989, 1990, 1992, 1994, 1995

== Performance in CONMEBOL competitions ==
- Copa Libertadores: 2 appearances

1971 – First Round
1972 – First Round
