= Deportivo Municipal de La Paz =

Bolivian football club

Deportivo Municipal
- Full name: Club Deportivo Municipal de La Paz
- Founded: 1944
- Ground: Luis Lastra; La Paz, Bolivia
- Capacity: 10,000
- Chairman: Carlos Aliaga
- League: Campeonato Paceño
Home colours	Away colours

Club Deportivo Municipal de La Paz is a Bolivian football club based in La Paz. Founded on 20 October 1944, it is currently on a recess due to owing 18,000 bolivianos (Bs.) to the La Paz Football Association. Their stadium, Estadio Luis Lastra de La Paz, sits empty since it was last used in 1997.

== History ==
The club was founded in 1944 as Club Deportivo Municipal, and participated in the 1962, 1966, and 1974 Copa Libertadores.

== Honours ==
=== National ===
- Bolivian Primera División
  - Winners (2): 1961, 1965
- Bolivian Second Division
  - Winners (1): 1995

=== Regional ===
- Campeonato Paceño
  - Winners (6): 1958, 1960, 1961, 1965, 1973, 1998
- Campeonato de 2.ª Categoría
  - Winners (1): 1953

== Performance in CONMEBOL competitions ==
- Copa Libertadores: 3 appearances

1962 – First Round
1966 – First Round
1974 – First Round
