= Club San José =

Bolivian football club

CD San José
- Full name: Club Deportivo San José de Oruro
- Nicknames: El Santo (The Saint); El Equipo Minero (Miner Team)
- Founded: 19 March 1942; 83 years ago
- Ground: Estadio Jesús Bermúdez; Oruro, Bolivia
- Capacity: 33,000
- Chairman: Elías Vallejos
- Manager: Luis Choque
- League: Oruro Football Association Primera B Championship
- 2021: División Profesional, 16th (relegated)
Home colours	Away colours

Club Deportivo San José is a football club from Oruro, Bolivia, which competed in the Bolivian Primera División until its 2021 season.

Founded in 1942, they have won the Bolivian league four times: in 1955, 1995, 2007, and 2018. Their colours are white and blue, and they play at the Estadio Jesús Bermúdez (capacity 35,000).

== History ==
The club was founded on 19 March 1942 as Liga Deportiva San José.

The club won its first title in 1949 by winning the Oruro regional championship. The club added three more regional titles in the 1950s, until joining the Bolivian national championship for the 1954 season. In the club's debut season, San Jose finished 6th out of 9 teams. The following season, with the league expanding from 9 to 11 teams, the club won the league title, with 13 wins, 3 draws, and 4 losses.

In the 1985 Bolivian Primera División the club was involved in a relegation playoff, but won 10-2 on aggregate to maintain its permanence in the top tier of Bolivian football.

In the 1999 season, the club had an average campaign in the Apertura tournament, finishing 8th of 12. However, they had a dismal campaign in the Clausura, losing 8 out of their 12 games, forcing them to play a relegation playoff. San Jose lost the relegation playoff to Mariscal Braun 4-3 on penalties after a 2-2 draw, sending the club down to the second division for the first time in its history. The club was unable to achieve immediate promotion in the 2000 season, but after a great campaign in 2001 the club returned to the top tier for the 2002 season.

In the 2007 Clausura, the club won its third title, defeating La Paz FC 3-2 on aggregate.

In the 2018 Clausura the club won its fourth title, amassing 53 points over 26 games.

In 2021 they were relegated after recording one of the worst campaigns for a top flight team in the world, with only one point in 30 matches. Their relegation was confirmed with 8 matches left in the season after a 4-1 loss against Bolivar. The team was forced to use youngsters, as the club had amassed huge debts, with reports saying that players had gone almost eight months without pay.

== Uniform ==
- Home: White t-shirt with a blue "V", blue shorts and blue socks.
- Away: Navy blue t-shirt with a blue "V" and orange details, navy blue shorts and socks of the same color.
- Third: Crimson red shirt with a blue "V", blue pants and blue socks.

== Honours ==
=== National ===
- Bolivian Primera División
  - Winners (4): 1955, 1995, 2007-C, 2018-C
- Bolivian Second Division
  - Winners (1): 2001

=== Regional ===
- Primera "A" (AFO)
  - Winners (14): 1949, 1951, 1953, 1954, 1964, 1968, 1969, 1970, 1972, 1974, 1975, 1976, 2000, 2001

== Performance in CONMEBOL competitions ==
- Copa Libertadores: 7 appearances

Best: Round of 16 in 1996.
1992: First Round
1993: First Round
1996: Round of 16
2008: First Round
2013: First Round
2015: First Round
2019: First Round

- Copa Sudamericana: 4 appearances

Best: Round of 16 in 2010.
2010: Round of 16
2011: First Round
2014: First Round
2018: First Round

== Current squad ==
- Updated 15 April 2022.
