= 2004 Copa Sudamericana finals =

- Event: 2004 Copa Sudamericana
Bolívar	Boca Juniors
(Bolivia)	(Argentina)
1	2
- on aggregate

First leg
Bolívar	Boca Juniors
1	0
- Date: 8 December 2004
- Venue: Estadio Hernando Siles, La Paz
- Referee: Carlos Eugênio Simon (Brazil)

Second leg
Boca Juniors	Bolívar
2	0
- Date: 17 December 2004
- Venue: La Bombonera, Buenos Aires
- Referee: Carlos Chandía (Chile)

The 2004 Copa Sudamericana finals was a two-legged football match-up to determine the 2004 Copa Sudamericana champion. It was contested by Bolivian club Bolívar and Argentinian club Boca Juniors. Both teams were playing in their first Copa Sudamericana finals. The first leg was played in Estadio Hernando Siles in La Paz on 8 December and the host team Bolívar won 1–0. The second leg was played in La Bombonera in Buenos Aires on 17 December and the host team Boca Juniors won 2–0, thus being crowned the champions.

It was also the first Copa Sudamericana trophy won by Boca Juniors, which as winners, earned the right to play in the 2005 Recopa Sudamericana against the winner of the 2004 Copa Libertadores.

== Qualified teams ==
Team	Previous finals app.
(Bolivia) Bolívar	None
(Argentina) Boca Juniors	None

Notes

- **Bold** indicates winning years

== Venues ==
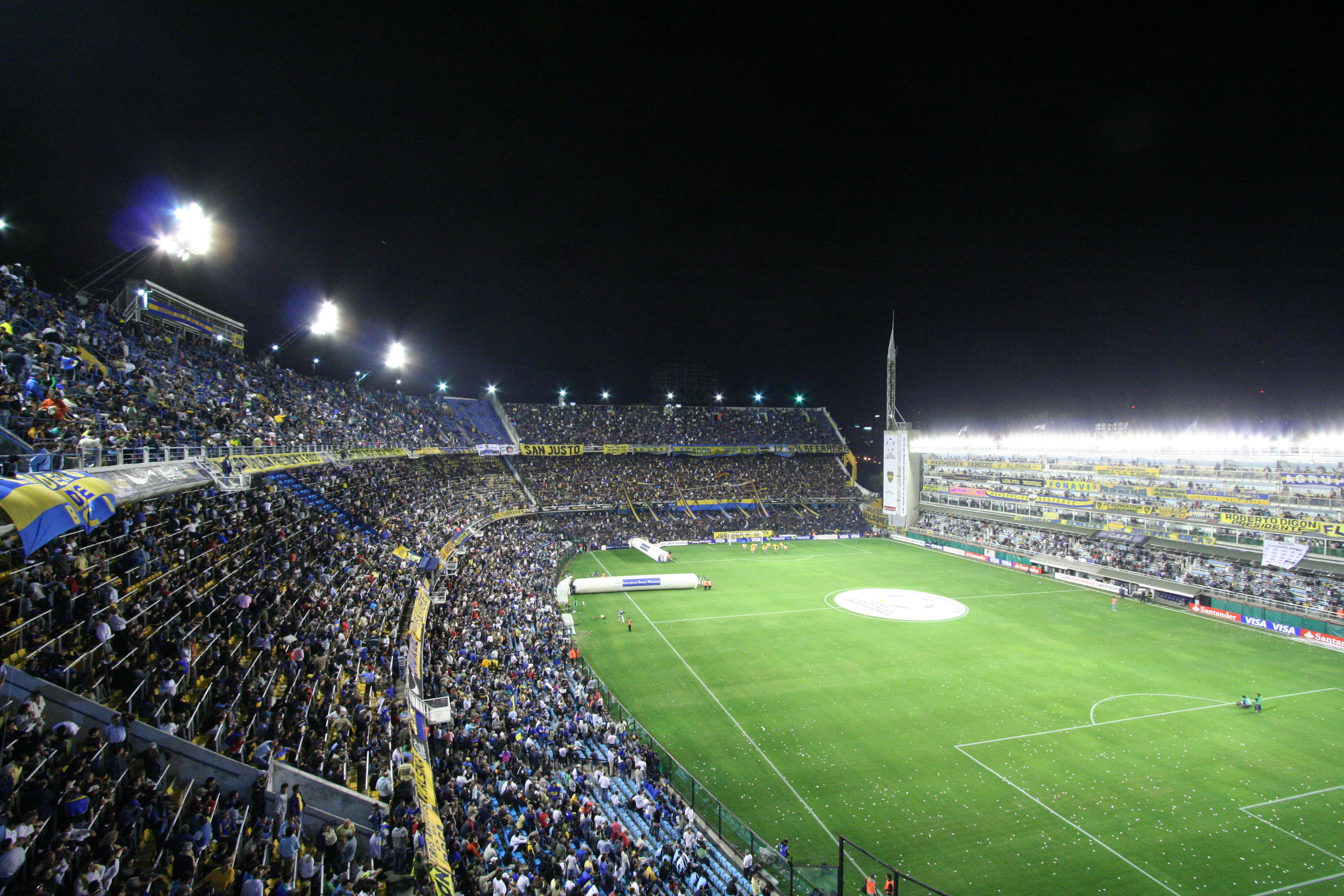
Hernando Siles Stadium (left) and La Bombonera, venues for the series

== Road to the final ==
Bolívar					Boca Juniors			
Opponent	Agg.	1st leg	2nd leg	Round	Opponent	Agg.	1st leg	2nd leg
(Bolivia) Aurora	5–2	2–1 (A)	3–1 (H)	First round	– (Note: Entered directly in second round.)			
(Chile) Universidad de Concepción	4–2	0–0 (A)	4–2 (H)	Second round	(Argentina) San Lorenzo	2–2 (4–1 p)	0–1 (A)	2–1 (H) (Note: Played at Estadio Padre Ernesto Martearena due to a commercial agreement between Boca Juniors and the government of Salta Province in a strategical decision to raise a greater amount of income from logistics and box office..)
(Argentina) Arsenal	3–1	0–1 (A)	3–0 (H)	Quarterfinals	(Paraguay) Cerro Porteño	1–1 (8–7 p)	1–1 (H)	0–0 (A)
(Argentina) LDU Quito	3–2	1–1 (A)	2–1 (H)	Semifinals	(Brazil) Internacional	4–2	4–2 (H)	0–0 (A)

== Match details ==
=== First leg ===
8 December 2004
20:15 (UTC-4)
First leg

Bolívar (Bolivia)	1–0	(Argentina) Boca Juniors
Chiorazzo 75'	Report

Estadio Hernando Siles, La Paz
Attendance: 42,800
Referee: Carlos Eugênio Simon (Brazil)

**Bolívar**	**Boca Juniors**

GK	1	(Brazil) Mauro Machado	(yellow card) 71'
RB	14	(Brazil) Júlio César	(yellow card) 26'
CB	6	(Bolivia) Óscar Sánchez
CB	3	(Bolivia) Marco Sandy (c)
LB	24	(Bolivia) Gonzalo Galindo		(substituted off) 66'
DM	21	(Bolivia) Rubén Tufiño
RM	18	(Bolivia) Limberg Gutiérrez
CM	22	(Bolivia) Ronald García		(substituted off) 74'
LM	16	(Bolivia) Daner Pachi
CF	17	(Bolivia) Roger Suárez
CF	8	(Argentina) Horacio Chiorazzo
Substitutes:
DF	11	(Bolivia) Percy Colque		(substituted on) 66'
MF	10	(Bolivia) Pedro Guiberguis		(substituted on) 74'
Manager:
(Bolivia) Vladimir Soria

GK	1	(Argentina) Roberto Abbondanzieri	(yellow card) 22'
RB	15	(Argentina) José María Calvo	(yellow card) 56'
CB	2	(Argentina) Rolando Schiavi
CB	13	(Argentina) Cristian Traverso
LB	6	(Argentina) Aníbal Matellán
DM	5	(Argentina) Raúl Cascini
RM	8	(Argentina) Diego Cagna (c)
CM	11	(Colombia) Fabián Vargas	(yellow card) 42'	(substituted off) 65'
LM	23	(Argentina) Andrés Guglielminpietro		(substituted off) 82'
CF	7	(Argentina) Guillermo Barros Schelotto		(substituted off) 89'
CF	10	(Argentina) Carlos Tevez
Substitutes:
MF	19	(Argentina) Neri Cardozo		(substituted on) 65'
MF	18	(Argentina) Matías Donnet		(substituted on) 82'
FW	16	(Argentina) Ariel Carreño		(substituted on) 89'
Manager:
(Argentina) Jorge José Benítez

Assistant referees:
(Brazil) Aristeu Tavares
(Brazil) Nilton Rodrigues
Fourth official:
(Brazil) Edilson Carvalho

=== Second leg ===
17 December 2004
21:15 (UTC-3)
Second leg

Boca Juniors (Argentina)	2–0	(Bolivia) Bolívar
Palermo 14'; Tevez 28'	Report

La Bombonera, Buenos Aires
Attendance: 55,000
Referee: Carlos Chandía (Chile)

**Boca Juniors**	**Bolívar**

GK	1	(Argentina) Roberto Abbondanzieri
RB	15	(Argentina) José María Calvo
CB	2	(Argentina) Rolando Schiavi
CB	13	(Argentina) Cristian Traverso	(yellow card) 33'
LB	6	(Argentina) Aníbal Matellán
DM	5	(Argentina) Raúl Cascini
RM	8	(Argentina) Diego Cagna (c)		(substituted off) 67'
LM	23	(Argentina) Andrés Guglielminpietro		(substituted off) 82'
AM	7	(Argentina) Guillermo Barros Schelotto
CF	9	(Argentina) Martín Palermo
CF	10	(Argentina) Carlos Tevez		(substituted off) 75'
Substitutes:
MF	14	(Argentina) Pablo Ledesma		(substituted on) 67'
MF	11	(Colombia) Fabián Vargas		(substituted on) 75'
MF	19	(Argentina) Neri Cardozo		(substituted on) 82'
Manager:
(Argentina) Jorge José Benítez

GK	1	(Brazil) Mauro Machado
RB	14	(Brazil) Júlio César	(yellow card) 29'
CB	6	(Bolivia) Óscar Sánchez
CB	3	(Bolivia) Marco Sandy (c)	(yellow card) 75'
LB	11	(Bolivia) Percy Colque		(substituted off) 46'
DM	21	(Bolivia) Rubén Tufiño
CM	2	(Bolivia) Limbert Pizarro	(yellow card) 72'
CM	22	(Bolivia) Ronald García
RF	18	(Bolivia) Limberg Gutiérrez
CF	8	(Argentina) Horacio Chiorazzo
LF	24	(Bolivia) Gonzalo Galindo
Substitutes:
FW	12	(Bolivia) Roger Suárez		(substituted on) 46'
Manager:
(Bolivia) Vladimir Soria

Assistant referees:
(Chile) Rodrigo González
(Chile) Mario Vargas
Fourth official:
(Chile) Pablo Pozo
