= 2002 in Ecuadorian football =

Football in Ecuador
- Season: 2002

The 2002 season was the 80th season of competitive football in Ecuador.

== National leagues ==
=== Serie A ===
- Champion: Emelec (10th title)
- International cup qualifiers:
  - 2003 Copa Libertadores: Emelec, Barcelona, El Nacional
  - 2002 Copa Sudamericana: Barcelona, Aucas
- Relegated: Olmedo, Macará

=== Serie B ===
- Winner: Técnico Universitario (4th title)
- Promoted: Técnico Universitario, Manta
- Relegated: LDU Portoviejo

=== Segunda ===
- Winner: Deportivo Quevedo
- Promoted: Deportivo Quevedo

== Clubs in international competitions ==
Team	2002 Copa Libertadores	2002 Copa Sudamericana
Aucas	N/A	Eliminated in the Preliminary Stage
Barcelona	N/A	Eliminated in the Preliminary Stage
El Nacional	Eliminated in the Round of 16	N/A
Emelec	Eliminated in the First Stage	N/A
Olmedo	Eliminated in the Round of 16	N/A

== National teams ==
=== Senior team ===
The Ecuador national team played 15 matches in 2002: three FIFA World Cup matches, to CONCACAF Gold Cup matches, and ten friendlies.

==== 2002 FIFA World Cup ====
Ecuador participated in their first FIFA World Cup. They were drawn in Group G with Italy, Mexico, and Croatia. They were eliminated from the competition in the Group Stage, but not before registering their first World Cup victory over 1998 third-place finisher, Croatia.

Team	Pld	W	D	L	GF	GA	GD	Pts
Mexico	3	2	1	0	4	2	+2	7
Italy	3	1	1	1	4	3	+1	4
Croatia	3	1	0	2	2	3	−1	3
Ecuador	3	1	0	2	2	4	−2	3

3 June 2002
20:30 (UTC+9)

Italy	2 – 0	Ecuador
Vieri 7', 27'	(Report)

Sapporo Dome, Sapporo
Attendance: 31,081
Referee: Brian Hall (United States)

9 June 2002
15:30 (UTC+9)

Mexico	2 – 1	Ecuador
Borgetti 28'; Torrado 57'	(Report)	Delgado 5'

Miyagi Stadium, Miyagi
Attendance: 45,610
Referee: Mourad Daami (Tunisia)

13 June 2002
20:30 (UTC+9)

Ecuador	1 – 0	Croatia
Méndez 48'	(Report)

International Stadium Yokohama, Yokohama
Attendance: 65,862
Referee: William Mattus (Costa Rica)

==== CONCACAF Gold Cup ====
Ecuador was invited to play in the 2002 CONCACAF Gold Cup, held in the United States. They were drawn into Group D with Haiti and Canada. Despite a tie among all the team in the group, they were eliminated from the competition in the Group Stage by a draw of lots.

Team	Pld	W	D	L	GF	GA	GD	Pts
Canada	2	1	0	1	2	2	0	3
Haiti	2	1	0	1	2	2	0	3
Ecuador	2	1	0	1	2	2	0	3

20 January 2002

Ecuador	0 – 2	Haiti
		Méndez 6' (o.g.); Alerte 44'

Orange Bowl, Miami
Attendance: 12,253
Referee: Carlos Batres (Guatemala)

22 January 2002

Ecuador	2 – 0	Canada
Aguinaga 89', 90+4'

Orange Bowl, Miami
Attendance: 3,827
Referee: Brian Hall (United States)

==== Friendlies ====
12 January 2002

Ecuador	1 – 0	Guatemala
I. Hurtado 83'

Estadio Modelo, Guayaquil
Attendance: 45,000
Referee: Roger Zambrano (Ecuador)

12 February 2002

Ecuador	1 – 0	Turkey
C. Tenorio 65'

Fuji Film Stadion, Breda
Attendance: 6,000
Referee: Jack van Hulten (Netherlands)

10 March 2002

United States	1 – 0	Ecuador
Lewis 21'

Legion Field, Birmingham, Alabama
Attendance: 24,133
Referee: Rodolfo Sibrian (ESA)

27 March 2002

Ecuador	3 – 0	Bulgaria
Kaviedes 24', 82'; C. Tenorio 51'

Giants Stadium, East Rutherford, New Jersey
Attendance: 45,511
Referee: Michael Kennedy (United States)

17 April 2002

Ecuador	0 – 0	South Africa

Estadio Nueva Condomina, Murcia
Attendance: 7,500
Referee: Rodríguez Santiago (Spain)

8 May 2002

Ecuador	1 – 0	FR Yugoslavia
Delgado 69'

Giants Stadium, East Rutherford, New Jersey
Attendance: 36,540
Referee: Richard Grady (United States)

23 May 2002

Ecuador	0 – 1	Senegal
		Guerrón 69' (o.g.)

Bird Stadium, Tottori
Attendance: 8,533
Referee: Kazuhiko Matsumura (Japan)

16 October 2002

Costa Rica	1 – 1	Ecuador
Bryce 53'		C. Tenorio 82'

Estadio Ricardo Saprissa, San José
Attendance: 8,000
Referee: Rodrigo Badilla (Costa Rica)

20 October 2002

Venezuela	2 – 0	Ecuador
Rey 30'; Moreno 79'

Estadio Olímpico, Caracas
Attendance: 24,000
Referee: Gustavo Brand (Venezuela)

20 November 2002

Ecuador	2 – 2	Costa Rica
Aguinaga 75' (pen.); Kaviedes 85'		Chinchilla 29'; Herron 45'

Estadio Olímpico Atahualpa, Quito
Attendance: 35,000
Referee: Pedro Ramos (Ecuador)
