= Copa Sudamericana records and statistics =

This page details the records and statistics of the Copa Sudamericana football tournament. The Copa Sudamericana is an international club tournament played annually in South America. It includes three to eight teams from all ten CONMEBOL members. It is typically held from August to December and consists of six stages. The all-time leader in titles won is Argentina's Boca Juniors with three titles.

== General performances ==
=== By club ===
Performance in the Copa Sudamericana by club
Club	Titles	Runners-up	Seasons won	Seasons runner-up
(Argentina) Boca Juniors	3	—	2004, 2005, 2026	—
(Ecuador) LDU Quito	2	1	2009, 2023	2011
(Argentina) Lanús	2	1	2013, 2025	2020
(Argentina) Independiente	2	—	2010, 2017	—
(Brazil) Athletico Paranaense	2	—	2018, 2021	—
(Ecuador) Independiente del Valle	2	—	2019, 2022	—
(Brazil) São Paulo	1	1	2012	2022
(Argentina) River Plate	1	1	2014	2003
(Argentina) San Lorenzo	1	—	2002	—
(Peru) Cienciano	1	—	2003	—
(Mexico) Pachuca	1	—	2006	—
(Argentina) Arsenal	1	—	2007	—
(Brazil) Internacional	1	—	2008	—
Universidad de Chile	1	—	2011	—
(Colombia) Santa Fe	1	—	2015	—
(Brazil) Chapecoense	1	—	2016	—
(Argentina) Defensa y Justicia	1	—	2020	—
(Argentina) Racing	1	—	2024	—
(Colombia) Atlético Nacional	0	3	—	2002, 2014, 2016
(Brazil) Atlético Mineiro	0	2	—	2025, 2026
(Bolivia) Bolívar	0	1	—	2004
(Mexico) UNAM	0	1	—	2005
(Chile) Colo-Colo	0	1	—	2006
(Mexico) América	0	1	—	2007
(Argentina) Estudiantes	0	1	—	2008
(Brazil) Fluminense	0	1	—	2009
(Brazil) Goiás	0	1	—	2010
(Argentina) Tigre	0	1	—	2012
(Brazil) Ponte Preta	0	1	—	2013
(Argentina) Huracán	0	1	—	2015
(Brazil) Flamengo	0	1	—	2017
(Colombia) Junior	0	1	—	2018
(Argentina) Colón	0	1	—	2019
(Brazil) Red Bull Bragantino	0	1	—	2021
(Brazil) Fortaleza	0	1	—	2023
(Brazil) Cruzeiro	0	1	—	2024

=== By nation ===
Country	Winners	Runners-Up	Winning Clubs	Runners-Up
Argentina	12	6	Boca Juniors (3); Independiente (2); Lanús (2); Arsenal (1);River Plate (1); San Lorenzo (1); Defensa y Justicia (1); Racing (1)	Colón (1); Estudiantes (1); Huracán (1); River Plate (1); Tigre (1); Lanús (1)
Brazil	5	9	Athletico Paranaense (2); Chapecoense (1); Internacional (1); São Paulo (1)	Atlético Mineiro (2); Flamengo (1); Fluminense (1); Goiás (1); Ponte Preta (1); Red Bull Bragantino (1); São Paulo (1); Fortaleza (1); Cruzeiro (1)
Ecuador	4	1	Independiente del Valle (2), LDU Quito (2)	LDU Quito (1)
Colombia	1	4	Santa Fe (1)	Atlético Nacional (3), Junior (1)
Mexico	1	2	Pachuca (1)	América (1); UNAM (1)
Chile	1	1	Universidad de Chile (1)	Colo-Colo (1)
Peru	1	0	Cienciano (1)	—
Bolivia	0	1	—	Bolívar (1)
Paraguay	0	0	—	—
Uruguay	0	0	—	—
Venezuela	0	0	—	—

=== Number of participating clubs by country ===
- Updated until 2026 edition.
- Years in bold: winner of the edition.
- Years in italics: runner-up of the edition.

Nation	#	Clubs	Years
Brazil (39)	15	São Paulo	2003, 2004, 2005, 2007, 2008, 2011, **2012**, 2013, 2014, 2017, 2018, 2020, 2022, 2023, 2026
Brazil (39)	11	Fluminense	2003, 2005, 2006, 2009, 2014, 2017, 2018, 2019, 2020, 2022, 2025
Brazil (39)	11	Atlético Mineiro	2003, 2004, 2008, 2009, 2010, 2011, 2018, 2019, 2020, 2025, 2026
Brazil (39)	10	Santos	2003, 2004, 2005, 2006, 2010, 2019, 2021, 2022, 2023, 2026
Brazil (39)	10	Corinthians	2003, 2005, 2006, 2007, 2017, 2019, 2021, 2023, 2024, 2025
Brazil (39)	10	Botafogo	2006, 2007, 2008, 2009, 2011, 2012, 2018, 2019, 2023, 2026
Brazil (39)	9	Vasco da Gama	2003, 2005, 2007, 2008, 2011, 2018, 2020, 2025, 2026
Brazil (39)	9	Goiás	2004, 2005, 2007, 2009, 2010, 2014, 2015, 2020, 2023
Brazil (39)	9	Athletico Paranaense	2006, 2007, 2008, 2009, 2011, 2015, **2018**, **2021**, 2024
Brazil (39)	9	Bahia	2012, 2013, 2014, 2015, 2018, 2019, 2020, 2021, 2025
Brazil (39)	8	Internacional	2003, 2004, 2005, **2008**, 2009, 2014, 2022, 2024
Brazil (39)	8	Cruzeiro	2003, 2004, 2005, 2006, 2007, 2017, 2024, 2025
Brazil (39)	8	Grêmio	2003, 2004, 2008, 2010, 2012, 2021, 2025, 2026
Brazil (39)	6	Flamengo	2003, 2004, 2009, 2011, 2016, 2017
Brazil (39)	6	Vitória	2009, 2010, 2013, 2014, 2016, 2025
Brazil (39)	5	Palmeiras	2003, 2008, 2010, 2011, 2012
Brazil (39)	5	Coritiba	2004, 2009, 2012, 2013, 2016
Brazil (39)	5	Sport Recife	2013, 2014, 2015, 2016, 2017
Brazil (39)	4	Figueirense	2004, 2007, 2012, 2016
Brazil (39)	4	Chapecoense	2015, **2016**, 2017, 2019
Brazil (39)	4	Red Bull Bragantino	2021, 2023, 2024, 2026
Brazil (39)	3	Ceará	2011, 2021, 2022
Brazil (39)	3	Atlético Goianiense	2012, 2021, 2022
Brazil (39)	3	Ponte Preta	2013, 2015, 2017
Brazil (39)	3	Cuiabá	2016, 2022, 2024
Brazil (39)	3	Fortaleza	2020, 2023, 2024
Brazil (39)	2	São Caetano	2003, 2004
Brazil (39)	2	Paraná	2004, 2006
Brazil (39)	2	Criciúma	2013, 2014
Brazil (39)	1	Juventude	2005
Brazil (39)	1	Avaí	2010
Brazil (39)	1	Grêmio Barueri	2010
Brazil (39)	1	Náutico	2013
Brazil (39)	1	Portuguesa	2013
Brazil (39)	1	Brasília	2015
Brazil (39)	1	Joinville	2015
Brazil (39)	1	Santa Cruz	2016
Brazil (39)	1	América Mineiro	2023
Argentina (28)	15	Lanús	2006, 2007, 2010, 2011, 2012, **2013**, 2014, 2015, 2016, 2020, 2021, 2022, 2024, **2025**, 2026
Argentina (28)	13	San Lorenzo	**2002**, 2003, 2004, 2006, 2007, 2008, 2009, 2013, 2016, 2018, 2021, 2023, 2026
Argentina (28)	13	Independiente	2003, 2008, **2010**, 2011, 2012, 2015, 2016, **2017**, 2019, 2020, 2021, 2022, 2025
Argentina (28)	12	Boca Juniors	2002, 2003, **2004**, **2005**, 2006, 2007, 2008, 2009, 2012, 2014, 2024, **2026**
Argentina (28)	12	River Plate	2002, 2003, 2004, 2005, 2006, 2007, 2008, 2009, 2013, **2014**, 2015, 2026
Argentina (28)	9	Estudiantes	2005, 2007, 2008, 2010, 2011, 2013, 2016, 2017, 2023
Argentina (28)	8	Racing	2002, 2012, 2013, 2017, 2019, 2022, **2024**, 2026
Argentina (28)	8	Vélez Sarsfield	2003, 2005, 2006, 2009, 2010, 2011, 2013, 2020
Argentina (28)	8	Defensa y Justicia	2017, 2018, 2019, **2020**, 2022, 2023, 2024, 2025
Argentina (28)	7	Arsenal	2004, **2007**, 2008, 2011, 2015, 2017, 2021
Argentina (28)	7	Banfield	2004, 2005, 2006, 2010, 2016, 2018, 2022
Argentina (28)	7	Argentinos Juniors	2008, 2010, 2011, 2012, 2019, 2020, 2024
Argentina (28)	6	Rosario Central	2003, 2005, 2014, 2018, 2021, 2024
Argentina (28)	5	Gimnasia y Esgrima	2002, 2006, 2014, 2017, 2023
Argentina (28)	5	Newell's Old Boys	2005, 2010, 2018, 2021, 2023
Argentina (28)	5	Tigre	2009, 2012, 2015, 2023, 2026
Argentina (28)	5	Huracán	2015, 2017, 2020, 2023, 2025
Argentina (28)	4	Colón	2003, 2012, 2018, 2019
Argentina (28)	4	Belgrano	2013, 2014, 2016, 2024
Argentina (28)	4	Unión	2019, 2020, 2022, 2025
Argentina (28)	3	Godoy Cruz	2011, 2014, 2025
Argentina (28)	2	Atlético Tucumán	2017, 2020
Argentina (28)	1	Quilmes	2004
Argentina (28)	1	Talleres de Córdoba	2021
Argentina (28)	1	Patronato	2023
Argentina (28)	1	Central Córdoba	2025
Argentina (28)	1	Barracas Central	2026
Argentina (28)	1	Deportivo Riestra	2026
Peru (27)	9	Sport Huancayo	2010, 2013, 2016, 2017, 2018, 2019, 2020, 2021, 2024
Peru (27)	8	Universitario	2002, 2005, 2007, 2008, 2011, 2015, 2016, 2023
Peru (27)	8	Melgar	2013, 2015, 2019, 2020, 2021, 2022, 2025, 2026
Peru (27)	7	Cienciano	**2003**, 2004, 2009, 2022, 2023, 2025, 2026
Peru (27)	5	Alianza Lima	2002, 2003, 2014, 2017, 2025
Peru (27)	5	Universidad César Vallejo	2010, 2011, 2014, 2023, 2024
Peru (27)	5	Sporting Cristal	2018, 2019, 2021, 2023, 2026
Peru (27)	4	Alianza Atlético	2004, 2005, 2009, 2026
Peru (27)	4	Ayacucho	2012, 2013, 2014, 2022
Peru (27)	4	UTC	2014, 2018, 2019, 2021
Peru (27)	3	Coronel Bolognesi	2004, 2006, 2007
Peru (27)	3	Universidad San Martín	2006, 2010, 2012
Peru (27)	3	Juan Aurich	2011, 2013, 2017
Peru (27)	3	Cusco	2016, 2020, 2025
Peru (27)	2	León de Huánuco	2012, 2015
Peru (27)	2	Unión Comercio	2012, 2015
Peru (27)	2	Deportivo Municipal	2016, 2019
Peru (27)	2	Binacional	2019, 2023
Peru (27)	2	Atlético Grau	2020, 2025
Peru (27)	2	ADT	2024, 2025
Peru (27)	2	Deportivo Garcilaso	2024, 2026
Peru (27)	1	Sport Áncash	2008
Peru (27)	1	Comerciantes Unidos	2017
Peru (27)	1	Sport Rosario	2018
Peru (27)	1	Carlos A. Mannucci	2021
Peru (27)	1	Sport Boys	2022
Venezuela (24)	9	Caracas	2010, 2014, 2017, 2018, 2019, 2020, 2023, 2025, 2026
Venezuela (24)	8	Mineros de Guayana	2005, 2006, 2012, 2013, 2018, 2019, 2020, 2021
Venezuela (24)	7	Deportivo Anzoátegui	2009, 2011, 2013, 2014, 2015, 2016, 2017
Venezuela (24)	6	Carabobo	2004, 2006, 2007, 2015, 2024, 2026
Venezuela (24)	6	Zamora	2007, 2009, 2015, 2016, 2018, 2020
Venezuela (24)	6	Deportivo La Guaira	2014, 2015, 2016, 2022, 2024, 2025
Venezuela (24)	5	Deportivo Táchira	2002, 2012, 2021, 2022, 2023
Venezuela (24)	5	Monagas	2002, 2003, 2012, 2019, 2026
Venezuela (24)	5	Trujillanos	2005, 2010, 2011, 2013, 2014
Venezuela (24)	5	Deportivo Lara	2010, 2012, 2013, 2016, 2019
Venezuela (24)	5	Estudiantes de Mérida	2018, 2019, 2020, 2022, 2023
Venezuela (24)	5	Metropolitanos	2021, 2022, 2024, 2025, 2026
Venezuela (24)	4	Academia Puerto Cabello	2021, 2023, 2025, 2026
Venezuela (24)	3	Aragua	2008, 2020, 2021
Venezuela (24)	2	Deportivo Italchacao	2003, 2004
Venezuela (24)	1	Unión Atlético Maracaibo	2008
Venezuela (24)	1	Yaracuyanos	2011
Venezuela (24)	1	Estudiantes de Caracas	2017
Venezuela (24)	1	Atlético Venezuela	2017
Venezuela (24)	1	Zulia	2019
Venezuela (24)	1	Llaneros	2020
Venezuela (24)	1	Hermanos Colmenarez	2022
Venezuela (24)	1	Rayo Zuliano	2024
Venezuela (24)	1	Universidad Central	2026
Chile (23)	15	Universidad Católica	2003, 2005, 2008, 2011, 2012, 2013, 2014, 2015, 2016, 2019, 2020, 2022, 2023, 2024, 2025
Chile (23)	9	Universidad de Chile	2005, 2009, 2010, **2011**, 2012, 2013, 2017, 2025, 2026
Chile (23)	8	Palestino	2016, 2017, 2019, 2021, 2023, 2024, 2025, 2026
Chile (23)	7	Colo-Colo	2006, 2007, 2010, 2013, 2019, 2022, 2023
Chile (23)	6	Huachipato	2006, 2014, 2015, 2020, 2021, 2024
Chile (23)	5	Unión Española	2009, 2018, 2019, 2022, 2025
Chile (23)	5	Deportes Iquique	2011, 2012, 2014, 2017, 2025
Chile (23)	5	Audax Italiano	2007, 2018, 2020, 2023, 2026
Chile (23)	5	Everton	2017, 2018, 2022, 2024, 2025
Chile (23)	4	O'Higgins	2012, 2016, 2017, 2026
Chile (23)	4	Cobresal	2014, 2021, 2023, 2026
Chile (23)	4	Unión La Calera	2019, 2020, 2022, 2024
Chile (23)	3	Cobreloa	2002, 2012, 2013
Chile (23)	3	Santiago Wanderers	2002, 2004, 2015
Chile (23)	3	Universidad de Concepción	2004, 2015, 2016
Chile (23)	3	Ñublense	2008, 2022, 2023
Chile (23)	3	Deportes Antofagasta	2019, 2021, 2022
Chile (23)	2	Coquimbo Unido	2020, 2024
Chile (23)	1	Provincial Osorno	2003
Chile (23)	1	Unión San Felipe	2010
Chile (23)	1	Deportes Temuco	2018
Chile (23)	1	Magallanes	2023
Bolivia (21)	14	Bolívar	2002, 2003, 2004, 2005, 2006, 2008, 2015, 2016, 2017, 2018, 2020, 2021, 2025, 2026
Bolivia (21)	10	Oriente Petrolero	2002, 2010, 2012, 2013, 2015, 2017, 2019, 2020, 2022, 2023
Bolivia (21)	9	Blooming	2008, 2009, 2012, 2013, 2016, 2018, 2020, 2023, 2026
Bolivia (21)	8	Nacional Potosí	2014, 2017, 2018, 2019, 2020, 2021, 2024, 2025
Bolivia (21)	7	Jorge Wilstermann	2007, 2014, 2016, 2017, 2021, 2022, 2024
Bolivia (21)	6	Guabirá	2018, 2019, 2021, 2022, 2023, 2026
Bolivia (21)	5	The Strongest	2003, 2005, 2011, 2013, 2022
Bolivia (21)	5	Aurora	2003, 2011, 2012, 2015, 2025
Bolivia (21)	4	Universitario de Sucre	2006, 2010, 2012, 2014
Bolivia (21)	4	Real Potosí	2007, 2013, 2015, 2016
Bolivia (21)	4	San José	2010, 2011, 2014, 2018
Bolivia (21)	2	Royal Pari	2019, 2022
Bolivia (21)	2	Always Ready	2020, 2024
Bolivia (21)	2	Atlético Palmaflor	2021, 2023
Bolivia (21)	2	Universitario de Vinto	2024, 2025
Bolivia (21)	2	San Antonio Bulo Bulo	2025, 2026
Bolivia (21)	1	La Paz	2008
Bolivia (21)	1	Petrolero	2017
Bolivia (21)	1	Real Tomayapo	2024
Bolivia (21)	1	GV San José	2025
Bolivia (21)	1	Independiente Petrolero	2026
Ecuador (20)	15	LDU Quito	2003, 2004, 2005, 2006, 2008, **2009**, 2010, 2011, 2015, 2016, 2017, 2021, 2022, **2023**, 2024
Ecuador (20)	11	Barcelona	2002, 2003, 2010, 2012, 2013, 2014, 2016, 2018, 2022, 2023, 2024
Ecuador (20)	11	Emelec	2009, 2010, 2011, 2012, 2013, 2014, 2015, 2016, 2020, 2020, 2023
Ecuador (20)	9	Universidad Católica	2014, 2015, 2016, 2017, 2019, 2020, 2022, 2024, 2025
Ecuador (20)	7	Independiente del Valle	2013, 2014, **2019**, 2021, **2022**, 2024, 2025
Ecuador (20)	6	Aucas	2002, 2004, 2016, 2020, 2021, 2025
Ecuador (20)	5	El Nacional	2005, 2006, 2007, 2018, 2020
Ecuador (20)	5	Deportivo Cuenca	2017, 2018, 2023, 2024, 2026
Ecuador (20)	4	Deportivo Quito	2008, 2010, 2011, 2012
Ecuador (20)	3	LDU Loja	2012, 2013, 2015
Ecuador (20)	3	Delfín	2022, 2023, 2024
Ecuador (20)	3	Mushuc Runa	2019, 2022, 2025
Ecuador (20)	3	Macará	2019, 2021, 2026
Ecuador (20)	2	Orense	2025, 2026
Ecuador (20)	1	Olmedo	2007
Ecuador (20)	1	Fuerza Amarilla	2017
Ecuador (20)	1	Guayaquil City	2021
Ecuador (20)	1	9 de Octubre	2022
Ecuador (20)	1	Técnico Universitario	2024
Ecuador (20)	1	Libertad	2026
Uruguay (20)	13	Danubio	2002, 2003, 2004, 2022, 2007, 2012, 2014, 2015, 2017, 2018, 2023, 2024, 2025
Uruguay (20)	10	Nacional	2002, 2003, 2006, 2011, 2012, 2015, 2018, 2021, 2022, 2026
Uruguay (20)	10	Peñarol	2004, 2010, 2013, 2014, 2016, 2018, 2019, 2020, 2021, 2023
Uruguay (20)	9	Defensor Sporting	2005, 2007, 2008, 2010, 2015, 2017, 2018, 2023, 2026
Uruguay (20)	9	River Plate	2008, 2009, 2010, 2013, 2014, 2019, 2020, 2022, 2023
Uruguay (20)	6	Liverpool	2009, 2012, 2017, 2019, 2020, 2022
Uruguay (20)	6	Montevideo Wanderers	2013, 2016, 2019, 2022, 2024, 2025
Uruguay (20)	5	Cerro Largo	2012, 2021, 2022, 2024, 2025
Uruguay (20)	4	Fénix	2011, 2016, 2020, 2021
Uruguay (20)	4	Boston River	2017, 2018, 2025, 2026
Uruguay (20)	3	Racing	2024, 2025, 2026
Uruguay (20)	2	Juventud	2015, 2026
Uruguay (20)	2	Plaza Colonia	2016, 2020
Uruguay (20)	2	Cerro	2018, 2019
Uruguay (20)	2	Montevideo City Torque	2021, 2026
Uruguay (20)	1	Central Español	2006
Uruguay (20)	1	Bella Vista	2011
Uruguay (20)	1	El Tanque Sisley	2013
Uruguay (20)	1	Rentistas	2014
Uruguay (20)	1	Rampla Juniors	2018
Paraguay (20)	16	Libertad	2002, 2003, 2004, 2006, 2007, 2008, 2009, 2011, 2013, 2014, 2015, 2016, 2017, 2021, 2023, 2024
Paraguay (20)	12	Cerro Porteño	2002, 2004, 2005, 2006, 2009, 2010, 2012, 2013, 2014, 2016, 2017, 2024
Paraguay (20)	10	Nacional	2011, 2013, 2015, 2017, 2018, 2020, 2021, 2022, 2024, 2026
Paraguay (20)	9	Guaraní	2003, 2005, 2010, 2012, 2013, 2019, 2023, 2024, 2025
Paraguay (20)	9	Olimpia	2008, 2010, 2011, 2012, 2015, 2017, 2022, 2024, 2026
Paraguay (20)	7	Sportivo Luqueño	2015, 2016, 2017, 2018, 2020, 2024, 2025
Paraguay (20)	6	Sol de América	2016, 2017, 2018, 2019, 2020, 2022
Paraguay (20)	3	Tacuary	2007, 2012, 2023
Paraguay (20)	3	Sportivo Ameliano	2023, 2024, 2025
Paraguay (20)	2	General Díaz	2014, 2018
Paraguay (20)	2	River Plate	2020, 2021
Paraguay (20)	2	Guaireña	2021, 2022
Paraguay (20)	2	General Caballero (JLM)	2022, 2023
Paraguay (20)	2	Sportivo Trinidense	2024, 2026
Paraguay (20)	1	Deportivo Capiatá	2014
Paraguay (20)	1	Independiente	2019
Paraguay (20)	1	Deportivo Santaní	2019
Paraguay (20)	1	12 de Octubre	2021
Paraguay (20)	1	2 de Mayo	2025
Paraguay (20)	1	Recoleta	2026
Colombia (18)	11	Deportivo Cali	2005, 2008, 2009, 2011, 2014, 2017, 2018, 2019, 2020, 2021, 2022
Colombia (18)	11	Deportes Tolima	2006, 2010, 2012, 2015, 2016, 2017, 2019, 2020, 2021, 2023, 2024
Colombia (18)	10	Atlético Nacional	2002, 2003, 2005, 2007, 2013, 2014, 2016, 2019, 2020, 2026
Colombia (18)	10	Junior	2004, 2015, 2016, 2017, 2018, 2019, 2021, 2022, 2023, 2025
Colombia (18)	9	Millonarios	2004, 2007, 2012, 2014, 2018, 2020, 2023, 2025, 2026
Colombia (18)	8	América de Cali	2002, 2008, 2018, 2021, 2022, 2024, 2025, 2026
Colombia (18)	8	Independiente Medellín	2006, 2016, 2017, 2021, 2022, 2023, 2024, 2026
Colombia (18)	8	Santa Fe	2010, 2011, **2015**, 2016, 2017, 2018, 2023, 2026
Colombia (18)	7	La Equidad	2009, 2011, 2012, 2013, 2019, 2021, 2022
Colombia (18)	6	Águilas Doradas	2013, 2014, 2015, 2017, 2019, 2023
Colombia (18)	4	Deportivo Pasto	2003, 2013, 2018, 2021
Colombia (18)	2	Once Caldas	2019, 2025
Colombia (18)	2	Atlético Bucaramanga	2025, 2026
Colombia (18)	1	Atlético Huila	2010
Colombia (18)	1	Envigado	2012
Colombia (18)	1	Patriotas	2017
Colombia (18)	1	Jaguares	2018
Colombia (18)	1	Alianza Petrolera	2024
Mexico (6)	2	América	2005, 2007
Mexico (6)	2	Pachuca	**2006**, 2007
Mexico (6)	2	Guadalajara	2007, 2008
Mexico (6)	1	UNAM	2005
Mexico (6)	1	Toluca	2006
Mexico (6)	1	San Luis	2008
United States (1)	2	D.C. United	2005, 2007
Costa Rica (1)	1	Alajuelense	2006
Honduras (1)	1	Motagua	2008

== Clubs ==
=== By semifinal appearances ===
- In **bold**, teams that were finalists that year.

Team	No. of appearances	Years in semifinals
(Brazil) São Paulo	5	2003, **2012**, 2013, 2014, **2022**
(Ecuador) LDU Quito	5	2004, **2009**, 2010, **2011**, **2023**
(Colombia) Atlético Nacional	4	**2002**, 2003, **2014**, **2016**
(Argentina) River Plate	4	**2003**, 2007, **2014**, 2015
(Argentina) Boca Juniors	4	**2004**, **2005**, 2014, **2026**
(Argentina) Lanús	4	**2013**, **2020**, 2024, **2025**
(Argentina) Vélez Sarsfield	3	2005, 2011, 2020
(Brazil) Athletico Paranaense	3	2006, **2018**, **2021**
(Paraguay) Libertad	3	2013, 2017, 2021
(Ecuador) Independiente del Valle	3	**2019**, **2022**, 2025
(Brazil) Corinthians	3	2019, 2023, 2024
(Brazil) Atlético Mineiro	3	2019, **2025**, **2026**
(Bolivia) Bolívar	2	2002, **2004**
(Argentina) San Lorenzo	2	**2002**, 2016
(Brazil) Internacional	2	2004, **2008**
(Chile) Universidad Católica	2	2005, 2012
(Colombia) Millonarios	2	2007, 2012
(Paraguay) Cerro Porteño	2	2009, 2016
(Brazil) Fluminense	2	**2009**, 2018
(Argentina) Independiente	2	**2010**, **2017**
Universidad de Chile	2	**2011**, 2025
(Brazil) Vasco da Gama	2	2011, 2026
(Colombia) Santa Fe	2	**2015**, 2018
(Colombia) Junior	2	2017, **2018**
(Argentina) Defensa y Justicia	2	**2020**, 2023
(Uruguay) Nacional	1	2002
(Peru) Cienciano	1	**2003**
(Mexico) UNAM	1	**2005**
(Chile) Colo-Colo	1	**2006**
(Mexico) Pachuca	1	**2006**
(Mexico) Toluca	1	2006
(Mexico) América	1	**2007**
(Argentina) Arsenal	1	**2007**
(Argentina) Argentinos Juniors	1	2008
(Argentina) Estudiantes	1	**2008**
(Mexico) Guadalajara	1	2008
(Uruguay) River Plate	1	2009
(Brazil) Goiás	1	**2010**
(Brazil) Palmeiras	1	2010
(Argentina) Tigre	1	**2012**
(Brazil) Ponte Preta	1	**2013**
(Argentina) Huracán	1	**2015**
(Paraguay) Sportivo Luqueño	1	2015
(Brazil) Chapecoense	1	**2016**
(Brazil) Flamengo	1	**2017**
(Argentina) Colón	1	**2019**
(Chile) Coquimbo Unido	1	2020
(Brazil) Bragantino	1	**2021**
(Uruguay) Peñarol	1	2021
(Brazil) Atlético Goianiense	1	2022
(Peru) Melgar	1	2022
(Brazil) Fortaleza	1	**2023**
(Brazil) Cruzeiro	1	**2024**
(Argentina) Racing	1	**2024**

==== By country ====
Country	Semifinals	Number of clubs	Clubs
Brazil	29	15	São Paulo (5), Athletico Paranaense (3), Corinthians (3), Atlético Mineiro (3), Fluminense (2), Internacional (2), Vasco da Gama (2), Chapecoense (1), Flamengo (1), Goiás (1), Palmeiras (1), Ponte Preta (1), Bragantino (1), Atlético Goianiense (1), Fortaleza (1), Cruzeiro (1)
Argentina	28	13	River Plate (4), Boca Juniors (4), Lanús (4), Vélez Sársfield (3), Independiente (2), San Lorenzo (2), Defensa y Justicia (2), Argentinos Juniors (1), Arsenal (1), Estudiantes (1), Huracan (1), Tigre (1), Colón (1), Racing (1)
Colombia	10	4	Atlético Nacional (4), Junior (2), Millonarios (2), Santa Fe (2)
Ecuador	8	2	LDU Quito (5), Independiente del Valle (3)
Chile	6	4	Universidad Católica (2), Universidad de Chile (2), Colo-Colo (1), Coquimbo Unido (1)
Paraguay	6	3	Libertad (3), Cerro Porteño (2), Sportivo Luqueño (1)
Mexico	5	5	América (1), Guadalajara (1), Pachuca (1), Toluca (1), UNAM (1)
Uruguay	3	3	Nacional (1), River Plate (1), Peñarol (1)
Peru	2	2	Cienciano (1), Melgar (1)
Bolivia	2	1	Bolívar (2)
Venezuela	0	0	—

=== By quarterfinal appearances ===
Team	No. of appearances	Years in quarterfinals
(Brazil) São Paulo	8	2003, 2007, 2012, 2013, 2014, 2022, 2023, 2026
(Argentina) Boca Juniors	6	2003, 2004, 2005, 2008, 2014, 2026
(Argentina) River Plate	6	2003, 2007, 2008, 2013, 2014, 2015
(Paraguay) Libertad	6	2003, 2011, 2013, 2017, 2021, 2024
(Ecuador) LDU Quito	6	2004, 2009, 2010, 2011, 2021, 2023
(Brazil) Fluminense	6	2005, 2009, 2017, 2018, 2019, 2025
(Argentina) Independiente	6	2010, 2012, 2015, 2017, 2019, 2020
(Colombia) Atlético Nacional	5	2002, 2003, 2013, 2014, 2016
(Paraguay) Cerro Porteño	5	2004, 2009, 2012, 2014, 2016
(Colombia) Junior	5	2004, 2016, 2017, 2018, 2020
(Argentina) Vélez Sarsfield	5	2005, 2009, 2011, 2013, 2020
(Argentina) Lanús	5	2006, 2013, 2020, 2024, 2025
(Brazil) Athletico Paranaense	5	2006, 2015, 2018, 2021, 2024
(Argentina) San Lorenzo	4	2002, 2006, 2009, 2016
(Uruguay) Nacional	4	2002, 2006, 2018, 2022
(Brazil) Santos	4	2003, 2004, 2021, 2026
(Brazil) Internacional	4	2004, 2005, 2008, 2022
(Brazil) Corinthians	4	2005, 2019, 2023, 2024
Universidad de Chile	4	2009, 2011, 2012, 2025
(Brazil) Atlético Mineiro	4	2010, 2019, 2025, 2026
(Colombia) Santa Fe	4	2011, 2015, 2018, 2026
(Bolivia) Bolívar	3	2002, 2004, 2025
(Argentina) Racing	3	2002, 2017, 2024
(Argentina) Arsenal	3	2004, 2007, 2011
(Chile) Universidad Católica	3	2005, 2012, 2020
(Brazil) Vasco da Gama	3	2007, 2011, 2026
(Brazil) Botafogo	3	2008, 2009, 2023
(Argentina) Estudiantes	3	2008, 2014, 2023
(Argentina) Defensa y Justicia	3	2018, 2020, 2023
(Ecuador) Independiente del Valle	3	2019, 2022, 2025
(Argentina) Gimnasia y Esgrima	2	2002, 2006
(Peru) Alianza Lima	2	2002, 2025
(Peru) Cienciano	2	2003, 2026
(Mexico) América	2	2005, 2007
(Mexico) Guadalajara	2	2007, 2008
(Colombia) Millonarios	2	2007, 2012
(Uruguay) Defensor Sporting	2	2007, 2015
(Brazil) Palmeiras	2	2008, 2010
(Brazil) Chapecoense	2	2015, 2016
(Colombia) Independiente Medellín	2	2016, 2024
(Brazil) Bahia	2	2018, 2020
(Brazil) Fortaleza	2	2023, 2024
(Chile) Santiago Wanderers	1	2002
(Bolivia) The Strongest	1	2003
(Mexico) UNAM	1	2005
(Chile) Colo-Colo	1	2006
(Mexico) Pachuca	1	2006
(Mexico) Toluca	1	2006
(Argentina) Argentinos Juniors	1	2008
(Uruguay) River Plate	1	2009
(Brazil) Avaí	1	2010
(Colombia) Deportes Tolima	1	2010
(Brazil) Goiás	1	2010
(Argentina) Newell's Old Boys	1	2010
(Peru) Universitario	1	2011
(Brazil) Grêmio	1	2012
(Argentina) Tigre	1	2012
(Brazil) Ponte Preta	1	2013
(Colombia) Rionegro Águilas	1	2013
(Ecuador) Emelec	1	2014
(Peru) Universidad César Vallejo	1	2014
(Argentina) Huracán	1	2015
(Paraguay) Sportivo Luqueño	1	2015
(Brazil) Coritiba	1	2016
(Chile) Palestino	1	2016
(Brazil) Flamengo	1	2017
(Paraguay) Nacional	1	2017
(Brazil) Sport Recife	1	2017
(Colombia) Deportivo Cali	1	2018
(Argentina) Colón	1	2019
(Colombia) La Equidad	1	2019
(Venezuela) Zulia	1	2019
(Chile) Coquimbo Unido	1	2020
(Uruguay) Peñarol	1	2021
(Brazil) Bragantino	1	2021
(Argentina) Rosario Central	1	2021
(Peru) Sporting Cristal	1	2021
(Brazil) Atlético Goianiense	1	2022
(Brazil) Ceará	1	2022
(Venezuela) Deportivo Táchira	1	2022
(Peru) Melgar	1	2022
(Brazil) América Mineiro	1	2023
(Brazil) Cruzeiro	1	2024
(Colombia) Once Caldas	1	2025
(Uruguay) Montevideo City Torque	1	2026

==== By country ====
Country	Quarterfinals	Number of clubs	Clubs
Brazil	61	25	São Paulo (8), Fluminense (6), Athletico Paranaense (5), Santos (4), Internacional (4), Corinthians (4), Atlético Mineiro (4), Vasco da Gama (3), Botafogo (3), Chapecoense (2), Palmeiras (2), Bahia (2), Fortaleza (2), Avaí (1), Coritiba (1), Flamengo (1), Goiás (1), Grêmio (1), Ponte Preta (1), Sport Recife (1), Bragantino (1), Atlético Goianiense (1), Ceará (1), América Mineiro (1), Cruzeiro (1)
Argentina	52	17	Boca Juniors (6), River Plate (6), Independiente (6), Vélez Sársfield (5), Lanús (5), San Lorenzo (4), Racing (3), Arsenal (3), Estudiantes (3), Defensa y Justicia (3), Gimnasia y Esgrima (2), Argentinos Juniors (1), Colón (1), Huracan (1), Newell's Old Boys (1), Tigre (1), Rosario Central (1)
Colombia	23	10	Atlético Nacional (5), Junior (5), Santa Fe (4), Millonarios (2), Independiente Medellín (2), Deportes Tolima (1), Deportivo Cali (1), La Equidad (1), Rionegro Águilas (1), Once Caldas (1)
Paraguay	13	4	Libertad (6), Cerro Porteño (5), Nacional (1), Sportivo Luqueño (1)
Chile	11	6	Universidad de Chile (4), Universidad Católica (3), Colo-Colo (1), Palestino (1), Santiago Wanderers (1), Coquimbo Unido (1)
Ecuador	10	3	LDU Quito (6), Independiente del Valle (3), Emelec (1)
Uruguay	9	5	Nacional (4), Defensor Sporting (2), River Plate (1), Peñarol (1), Montevideo City Torque (1)
Peru	8	6	Alianza Lima (2), Cienciano (2), Universidad César Vallejo (1), Universitario (1), Sporting Cristal (1), Melgar (1)
Mexico	7	5	América (2), Guadalajara (2), Pachuca (1), Toluca (1), UNAM (1)
Bolivia	4	2	Bolívar (3), The Strongest (1)
Venezuela	2	2	Zulia (1), Deportivo Táchira (1)

=== By round of 16 appearances ===
Club	No.	Years in round of 16
(Ecuador) LDU Quito	12	2003, 2004, 2008, 2009, 2010, 2011, 2015, 2017, 2018, 2021, 2023, 2024
(Argentina) River Plate	11	2002, 2003, 2004, 2005, 2006, 2007, 2008, 2013, 2014, 2015, 2026
(Argentina) Independiente	11	2003, 2010, 2011, 2012, 2015, 2016, 2017, 2019, 2020, 2021, 2025
(Argentina) Boca Juniors	10	2002, 2003, 2004, 2005, 2006, 2007, 2008, 2014, 2024, 2026
(Paraguay) Libertad	10	2002, 2003, 2011, 2013, 2014, 2015, 2017, 2021, 2023, 2024
(Brazil) São Paulo	10	2003, 2004, 2007, 2011, 2012, 2013, 2014, 2022, 2023, 2026
(Argentina) Lanús	10	2006, 2007, 2009, 2013, 2014, 2015, 2020, 2022, 2024, 2025
(Argentina) San Lorenzo	8	2002, 2003, 2004, 2006, 2009, 2016, 2018, 2023
(Chile) Universidad Católica	8	2003, 2005, 2008, 2011, 2012, 2013, 2020, 2022
(Brazil) Fluminense	8	2003, 2005, 2006, 2009, 2017, 2018, 2019, 2025
(Brazil) Botafogo	8	2007, 2008, 2009, 2011, 2018, 2019, 2023, 2026
(Paraguay) Cerro Porteño	7	2004, 2005, 2009, 2012, 2014, 2016, 2017
(Colombia) Santa Fe	7	2010, 2011, 2015, 2016, 2017, 2018, 2026
(Colombia) Atlético Nacional	6	2002, 2003, 2005, 2013, 2014, 2016
(Uruguay) Nacional	6	2002, 2003, 2006, 2018, 2021, 2022
(Brazil) Santos	6	2003, 2004, 2006, 2021, 2022, 2026
(Colombia) Junior	6	2004, 2016, 2017, 2018, 2020, 2021
(Brazil) Corinthians	6	2005, 2006, 2017, 2019, 2023, 2024
(Brazil) Athletico Parananense	6	2006, 2008, 2015, 2018, 2021, 2024
(Ecuador) Emelec	6	2009, 2010, 2012, 2014, 2015, 2023
(Bolivia) Bolívar	5	2002, 2004, 2020, 2025, 2026
(Peru) Cienciano	5	2003, 2004, 2009, 2025, 2026
(Brazil) Internacional	5	2004, 2005, 2008, 2009, 2022
(Argentina) Arsenal	5	2004, 2007, 2008, 2011, 2021
(Uruguay) Peñarol	5	2004, 2010, 2014, 2019, 2021
(Argentina) Vélez Sársfield	5	2005, 2009, 2011, 2013, 2020
(Brazil) Goiás	5	2007, 2009, 2010, 2014, 2023
Universidad de Chile	5	2009, 2011, 2012, 2013, 2025
(Colombia) América de Cali	4	2002, 2008, 2021, 2025
(Argentina) Colón	4	2003, 2012, 2018, 2019
(Uruguay) Defensor Sporting	4	2007, 2008, 2010, 2015
(Brazil) Vasco da Gama	4	2007, 2011, 2020, 2026
(Argentina) Estudiantes	4	2008, 2014, 2017, 2023
(Brazil) Atlético Mineiro	4	2010, 2019, 2025, 2026
(Paraguay) Olimpia	4	2011, 2015, 2022, 2026
(Brazil) Bahia	4	2013, 2014, 2018, 2020
(Ecuador) Independiente del Valle	4	2019, 2021, 2022, 2025
(Brazil) Bragantino	4	2021, 2023, 2024, 2026
(Argentina) Racing	3	2002, 2017, 2024
(Bolivia) The Strongest	3	2003, 2005, 2022
(Brazil) Cruzeiro	3	2004, 2005, 2024
(Argentina) Banfield	3	2005, 2010, 2018
(Argentina) Rosario Central	3	2005, 2021, 2024
(Chile) Colo-Colo	3	2006, 2007, 2022
(Colombia) Deportes Tolima	3	2006, 2010, 2015
(Colombia) Millonarios	3	2007, 2012, 2018
(Brazil) Palmeiras	3	2008, 2010, 2012
(Brazil) Flamengo	3	2011, 2016, 2017
(Brazil) Sport Recife	3	2013, 2015, 2017
(Brazil) Chapecoense	3	2015, 2016, 2017
(Colombia) Deportivo Cali	3	2018, 2020, 2022
(Argentina) Defensa y Justicia	3	2018, 2020, 2023
(Argentina) Gimnasia y Esgrima	2	2002, 2006
(Ecuador) Barcelona	2	2002, 2012
(Peru) Alianza Lima	2	2002, 2025
(Peru) Alianza Atlético	2	2004, 2009
(Mexico) América	2	2005, 2007
(United States) D.C. United	2	2005, 2007
(Ecuador) El Nacional	2	2006, 2007
(Mexico) Pachuca	2	2006, 2007
(Mexico) Guadalajara	2	2007, 2008
(Argentina) Argentinos Juniors	2	2008, 2019
(Brazil) Vitória	2	2009, 2014
(Uruguay) River Plate	2	2009, 2020
(Argentina) Newell's Old Boys	2	2010, 2023
(Argentina) Godoy Cruz	2	2011, 2025
(Ecuador) LDU Loja	2	2012, 2013
(Brazil) Grêmio	2	2012, 2021
(Brazil) Atlético Goianiense	2	2012, 2022
(Argentina) Tigre	2	2012, 2026
(Brazil) Coritiba	2	2013, 2016
(Brazil) Ponte Preta	2	2013, 2017
(Colombia) La Equidad	2	2013, 2019
(Chile) Huachipato	2	2014, 2024
(Argentina) Huracán	2	2015, 2025
(Uruguay) Montevideo Wanderers	2	2016, 2019
(Argentina) Belgrano	2	2016, 2024
(Colombia) Independiente Medellín	2	2016, 2024
(Chile) Palestino	2	2016, 2024
(Venezuela) Caracas	2	2018, 2019
(Peru) Sporting Cristal	2	2019, 2021
(Ecuador) Universidad Católica	2	2019, 2025
(Argentina) Unión de Santa Fe	2	2020, 2022
(Venezuela) Deportivo Táchira	2	2021, 2022
(Brazil) Fortaleza	2	2023, 2024
(Chile) Cobreloa	1	2002
(Uruguay) Danubio	1	2002
(Venezuela) Monagas	1	2002
(Chile) Santiago Wanderers	1	2002
(Brazil) São Caetano	1	2003
(Chile) Universidad de Concepción	1	2004
(Mexico) UNAM	1	2005
(Costa Rica) Alajuelense	1	2006
(Mexico) Toluca	1	2006
(Mexico) San Luis	1	2008
(Peru) Sport Áncash	1	2008
(Chile) Unión Española	1	2009
(Brazil) Avaí	1	2010
(Bolivia) San José	1	2010
(Chile) Unión San Felipe	1	2010
(Bolivia) Universitario	1	2010
(Bolivia) Aurora	1	2011
(Peru) Universitario	1	2011
(Ecuador) Deportivo Quito	1	2012
(Uruguay) Liverpool	1	2012
(Colombia) Águilas Doradas	1	2013
(Colombia) Deportivo Pasto	1	2013
(Paraguay) Deportivo Capiatá	1	2014
(Peru) Univ. César Vallejo	1	2014
(Brazil) Brasília	1	2015
(Paraguay) Sportivo Luqueño	1	2015
(Venezuela) Deportivo La Guaira	1	2016
(Brazil) Santa Cruz	1	2016
(Paraguay) Sol de América	1	2016
(Argentina) Atlético Tucumán	1	2017
(Paraguay) Nacional	1	2017
(Ecuador) Deportivo Cuenca	1	2018
(Bolivia) Royal Pari	1	2019
(Venezuela) Zulia	1	2019
(Chile) Coquimbo Unido	1	2020
(Uruguay) Fénix	1	2020
(Peru) Sport Huancayo	1	2020
(Chile) Unión La Calera	1	2020
(Brazil) Ceará	1	2022
(Peru) Melgar	1	2022
(Paraguay) Guaraní	1	2023
(Brazil) América Mineiro	1	2023
(Chile) Ñublense	1	2023
(Paraguay) Sportivo Ameliano	1	2024
(Ecuador) Mushuc Runa	1	2025
(Argentina) Central Córdoba	1	2025
(Colombia) Once Caldas	1	2025
(Ecuador) Macará	1	2026
(Uruguay) Montevideo City Torque	1	2026
(Paraguay) Recoleta	1	2026

==== By country ====
Country	Round of 16	Number of clubs	Clubs
Brazil	98	29	São Paulo (10), Fluminense (8), Botafogo (8), Corinthians (6), Athletico Paranaense (6), Santos (6), Internacional (5), Goiás (5), Vasco da Gama (4), Atlético Mineiro (4), Bahia (4), Red Bull Bragantino (4), Cruzeiro (3), Palmeiras (3), Flamengo (3), Sport Recife (3), Chapecoense (3), Vitória (2), Grêmio (2), Atlético Goianiense (2), Coritiba (2), Ponte Preta (2), Fortaleza (2), São Caetano (1), Avaí (1), Brasília (1), Santa Cruz (1), Ceará (1), América Mineiro (1)
Argentina	98	23	River Plate (11), Independiente (11), Boca Juniors (10), Lanús (10), San Lorenzo (8), Arsenal (5), Vélez Sársfield (5), Colón (4), Estudiantes (4), Racing (3), Banfield (3), Rosario Central (3), Defensa y Justicia (3), Gimnasia y Esgrima (2), Argentinos Juniors (2), Newell's Old Boys (2), Godoy Cruz (2), Belgrano (2), Unión de Santa Fe (2), Huracan (2), Tigre (2), Atlético Tucumán (1), Central Córdoba (1)
Colombia	39	12	Santa Fe (7), Atlético Nacional (6), Junior (6) América de Cali (4), Deportes Tolima (3), Millonarios (3), Deportivo Cali (3), La Equidad (2), Independiente Medellín (2), Águilas Doradas (1), Deportivo Pasto (1), Once Caldas (1)
Ecuador	34	10	LDU Quito (12), Emelec (6), Independiente del Valle (4), Barcelona (2), El Nacional (2), LDU Loja (2), Universidad Católica (2), Deportivo Quito (1), Deportivo Cuenca (1), Mushuc Runa (1), Macará (1)
Chile	28	13	Universidad Católica (8), Universidad de Chile (5), Colo-Colo (3), Huachipato (2), Palestino (2), Cobreloa (1), Santiago Wanderers (1), Universidad de Concepción (1), Unión Española (1), Unión San Felipe (1), Coquimbo Unido (1), Unión La Calera (1), Ñublense (1)
Paraguay	28	10	Libertad (10), Cerro Porteño (7), Olimpia (4), Deportivo Capiatá (1), Sportivo Luqueño (1), Sol de América (1), Nacional (1), Guaraní (1), Sportivo Ameliano (1), Recoleta (1)
Uruguay	23	9	Nacional (6), Peñarol (5), Defensor Sporting (4), River Plate (2), Montevideo Wanderers (2), Danubio (1), Liverpool (1), Fénix (1), Montevideo City Torque (1)
Peru	16	9	Cienciano (5), Alianza Lima (2), Alianza Atlético (2), Sporting Cristal (2), Sport Áncash (1), Universitario (1), Universidad César Vallejo (1), Sport Huancayo (1), Melgar (1)
Bolivia	12	6	Bolívar (5), The Strongest (3), San José (1), Universitario (1), Aurora (1), Royal Pari (1)
Mexico	9	6	América (2), Pachuca (2), Guadalajara (2), Toluca (1), UNAM (1), San Luis (1)
Venezuela	7	5	Caracas (2), Deportivo Táchira (2), Monagas (1), Deportivo La Guaira (1), Zulia (1)
United States	2	1	D.C. United (2)
Costa Rica	1	1	Alajuelense (1)

=== By Knockout phase play-off appearances ===
Club	No.	Years in Knockout phase play-off
(Ecuador) Barcelona	2	2023, 2024
(Paraguay) Libertad	2	**2023**, **2024**
(Colombia) Independiente Medellín	2	2023, 2026
(Peru) Sporting Cristal	2	2023, 2026
(Argentina) Tigre	2	2023, **2026**
(Ecuador) Independiente del Valle	2	2024, **2025**
(Chile) Palestino	2	**2024**, 2025
(Argentina) Boca Juniors	2	**2024**, **2026**
(Brazil) Bragantino	2	**2024**, **2026**
(Bolivia) Bolívar	2	**2025**, **2026**
(Brazil) Grêmio	2	2025, 2026
(Brazil) Vasco da Gama	2	2025, **2026**
(Brazil) América Mineiro	1	**2023**
(Chile) Audax Italiano	1	2023
(Brazil) Botafogo	1	**2023**
(Chile) Colo-Colo	1	2023
(Brazil) Corinthians	1	**2023**
(Ecuador) Emelec	1	**2023**
(Argentina) Estudiantes	1	**2023**
(Chile) Ñublense	1	**2023**
(Argentina) Patronato	1	2023
(Argentina) San Lorenzo	1	**2023**
(Peru) Universitario	1	2023
(Bolivia) Always Ready	1	2024
(Brazil) Athletico Paranaense	1	**2024**
(Paraguay) Cerro Porteño	1	2024
(Brazil) Cuiabá	1	2024
(Chile) Huachipato	1	**2024**
(Brazil) Internacional	1	2024
(Ecuador) LDU Quito	1	**2024**
(Uruguay) Racing	1	2024
(Argentina) Rosario Central	1	**2024**
(Ecuador) Universidad Católica	1	2024
(Peru) Alianza Lima	1	**2025**
(Colombia) América de Cali	1	**2025**
(Colombia) Atlético Bucaramanga	1	2025
(Brazil) Atlético Mineiro	1	**2025**
(Brazil) Bahia	1	2025
(Argentina) Central Córdoba	1	**2025**
(Uruguay) Cerro Largo	1	2025
(Paraguay) Guaraní	1	2025
(Colombia) Once Caldas	1	**2025**
(Bolivia) San Antonio Bulo Bulo	1	2025
Universidad de Chile	1	**2025**
(Venezuela) Caracas	1	2026
(Peru) Cienciano	1	**2026**
(Argentina) Lanús	1	2026
(Uruguay) Nacional	1	2026
(Chile) O'Higgins	1	2026
(Colombia) Santa Fe	1	**2026**
(Brazil) Santos	1	**2026**
(Venezuela) Universidad Central	1	2026

==== By country ====
Country	Knockout phase play-off	Number of clubs	Clubs
Brazil	15	12	Red Bull Bragantino (2), Grêmio (2), Vasco da Gama (2), América Mineiro (1), Botafogo (1), Corinthians (1), Athletico Paranaense (1), Cuiabá (1), Internacional (1), Atlético Mineiro (1), Bahia (1), Santos (1)
Argentina	10	8	Tigre (2), Boca Juniors (2), Estudiantes (1), Patronato (1), San Lorenzo (1), Rosario Central (1), Central Córdoba (1), Lanús (1)
Chile	8	7	Palestino (2), Audax Italiano (1), Colo-Colo (1), Ñublense (1), Huachipato (1), Universidad de Chile (1), O'Higgins (1)
Ecuador	7	5	Barcelona (2), Independiente del Valle (2), Emelec (1), LDU Quito (1), Universidad Católica (1)
Colombia	6	5	Independiente Medellín (2), América de Cali (1), Atlético Bucaramanga (1), Once Caldas (1), Santa Fe (1)
Peru	5	4	Sporting Cristal (2), Universitario (1), Alianza Lima (1), Cienciano (1)
Bolivia	4	3	Bolívar (2), Always Ready (1), San Antonio Bulo Bulo (1)
Paraguay	4	3	Libertad (2), Cerro Porteño (1), Guaraní (1)
Uruguay	3	3	Racing (1), Cerro Largo (1), Nacional (1)
Venezuela	2	2	Caracas (1), Universidad Central (1)

=== Specific group stage records ===
==== Best group stage ====
#	Year	Club	Pts	Pld	W	D	L	GF	GA	GD
1	2022	(Brazil) Ceará	18	6	6	0	0	17	1	+16

==== Worst group stage ====
#	Year	Club	Pts	Pld	W	D	L	GF	GA	GD
1	2022	(Bolivia) Oriente Petrolero	0	6	0	0	6	3	23	−20
2	2023	(Bolivia) Oriente Petrolero	0	6	0	0	6	2	20	−18
3	2021	(Bolivia) Guabirá	0	6	0	0	6	1	18	−17
4	2023	(Uruguay) Peñarol	0	6	0	0	6	4	18	−14
5	2026	(Bolivia) Independiente Petrolero	0	6	0	0	6	3	15	−12
6	2023	(Venezuela) Academia Puerto Cabello	0	6	0	0	6	2	14	−12

=== Unbeaten sides ===
- Five clubs have won the Copa Sudamericana unbeaten:
  - Universidad de Chile had 10 wins and 2 draws in 2011
  - (Brazil) São Paulo had 5 wins and 5 draws in 2012
  - (Argentina) River Plate had 8 wins and 2 draws in 2014
  - (Argentina) Defensa y Justicia had 6 wins and 3 draws in 2020
  - (Ecuador) Independiente del Valle had 6 wins and 1 draw in 2022

=== Finals success rate ===
Four clubs has appeared in the finals of the Copa Sudamericana more than once with a 100% success rate:

- Boca Juniors (2004, 2005, 2026)
- Independiente (2010, 2017)
- Athletico Paranaense (2018, 2021)
- Independiente del Valle (2019, 2022)

Ten clubs have appeared in the final once, being victorious on that occasion:

- San Lorenzo (2002)
- Cienciano (2003)
- Pachuca (2006)
- Arsenal (2007)
- Internacional (2008)
- Universidad de Chile (2011)
- Santa Fe (2015)
- Chapecoense (2016)
- Defensa y Justicia (2020)
- Racing (2024)

On the other end, eighteen clubs have appeared in the finals and have never won the tournament. Two of those clubs has appeared in the finals more than once, losing on each occasion:

- Atlético Nacional (2002, 2014, 2016)
- Atlético Mineiro (2025, 2026)

=== Consecutive participations ===
Emelec have the record number of consecutive participations with 8 from 2009 to 2016.

=== Goals ===
==== Biggest wins ====
- Oriente Petrolero 1–10 Fluminense (May 26, 2022, also largest away win)
- Defensor Sporting 9–0 Sport Huancayo (September 16, 2010)

==== Biggest two leg win ====
- Alajuelense 2–11 Colo-Colo (2006 Copa Sudamericana)

=== Consecutive finals ===
One team has appeared in a record of two consecutive finals:

- Boca Juniors (2004, 2005)

=== Successful defending ===
Only one club have successfully defended the trophy: Boca Juniors (2005)

=== Unsuccessful title-holder campaigns ===
#	Club	Year	Defeated by	Stage reached
2	(Ecuador) LDU Quito	2010	Independiente	Semi-finals
2	(Ecuador) LDU Quito	2024	Lanús	Round of 16
2	(Argentina) Lanús	2014	Cerro Porteño	Round of 16
2	(Argentina) Lanús	2026	Cienciano	Knockout play-offs
1	(Argentina) San Lorenzo	2003	The Strongest	Round of 16
1	(Peru) Cienciano	2004	LDU Quito	Round of 16
1	(Argentina) Boca Juniors	2006	Nacional	Round of 16
1	(Mexico) Pachuca	2007	América	Round of 16
1	(Argentina) Arsenal	2008	Estudiantes	Round of 16
1	(Brazil) Internacional	2009	Universidad de Chile	Round of 16
1	(Argentina) Independiente	2011	LDU Quito	Round of 16
1	Universidad de Chile	2012	São Paulo	Quarter-finals
1	(Brazil) São Paulo	2013	Ponte Preta	Semi-finals
1	(Argentina) River Plate	2015	Huracán	Semi-finals
1	(Colombia) Santa Fe	2016	Cerro Porteño	Round of 16
1	(Brazil) Chapecoense	2017	Flamengo	Round of 16
