= Giancarlo Maldonado =

Venezuelan footballer (born 1982)

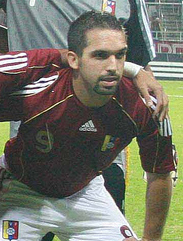
- Maldonado in 2008

Personal information
- Full name: Giancarlo Gregorio Maldonado Marrero
- Date of birth: 29 June 1982 (age 44)
- Place of birth: Caracas, Venezuela
- Height: 5 ft 8 in (1.73 m)
- Position: Striker

Senior career*
Years	Team	Apps	(Gls)
1999–2001	River Plate Montevideo	12	(3)
2001–2002	Nacional Táchira	21	(8)
2002–2003	Mineros	31	(5)
2003–2006	Maracaibo	35	(27)
2006–2007	O'Higgins	32	(16)
2007–2011	Atlante	106	(51)
2009	→ Xerez (loan)	11	(1)
2010	→ Chivas USA (loan)	10	(2)
2011–2012	Atlas	16	(2)
2012–2013	Mineros	17	(5)
2012–2013	Deportivo Táchira	18	(4)
2013–2014	Estudiantes de Merida	13	(6)
2013–2014	Deportivo Táchira	16	(3)
2014–2015	Atlante	24	(11)
2015	Real España	9	(0)
2016	Atletico Venezuela	18	(5)
2016–2017	Deportivo Táchira	23	(9)
2017	Alebrijes de Oaxaca	14	(7)
2017–2018	Club San José	17	(1)
2018	Atlante	14	(3)
2018–2019	Deportivo Táchira	27	(3)
2019–2020	Academia Puerto Cabello	16	(1)
2021–2022	Metropolitan FA	0	(0)

International career
2003–2011	Venezuela	65	(22)

Managerial career
- 2023: Yalmakán
- 2024–2025: Portuguesa
- 2026: Anzoátegui
- * Club domestic league appearances and goals

Giancarlo Gregorio Maldonado Marrero (Spanish pronunciation: [xjaŋˈkaɾlo maldoˈnaðo]; born 29 June 1982) is a Venezuelan professional football manager and former player who played as a striker.

== Club career ==
=== River Plate ===
Maldonado began his footballing career in Uruguay, where he started out in the youth teams of Montevideo club River Plate, going on his first team debut in 1999 but first team opportunities were limited and he twice returned to his home country of Venezuela on loan. First he went on loan to Nacional Táchira, where his father was the manager, for the 2001–2002 season and despite only scoring 8 goals he helped the now defunct club to their only title. The following season Maldonado was on loan at Mineros de Guayana.

=== Maracaibo ===
In 2003 Maldonado signed for Unión Atlético Maracaibo where he stayed for three seasons and scored 22 goals. During his time at the club he played 5 games without scoring in the 2004 Copa Libertadores and scored 3 goals in his 6 appearances in the 2006 Copa Libertadores.

=== O'Higgins ===
In 2006 Maldonado joined Chilean club O'Higgins where he scored 21 goals in his 42 appearances.

=== Atlante ===
Maldonado joined México Primera División side Atlante F.C. in July 2007, scoring on his debut in a friendly against Tecamachalco. He made his league debut for Atlante on 4 August 2007 against Jaguares scoring his side's only goal in a match that finished in a 1–1 draw. His goals for Atlante helped the team win the Apertura 2007 title, their third title and an historic one in their first season since relocating from Mexico City to Cancún, Mexico. Maldonado finished the Apertura 2007 campaign as second top goalscorer with 18 goals. His 18 goals for Atlante and the 8 that he had scored earlier in the year with C.D. O'Higgins earned him the 2007 Golden Boot of the Americas award, sharing the honour with Martín Palermo of Boca Juniors. In the Clausura 2008, Maldonado was again Atlante's top scorer, this time with 7 goals, the reigning champions Atlante were however unable to defend their title, missing out on the playoffs following a 3–2 loss to C.F. Monterrey.

Having won the Apertura 2007 Atlante qualified for the CONCACAF Champions League 2008–09. Maldonado scored in the knock out stages, helping Atlante to the Final of the competition where they defeated Cruz Azul 2–0 on aggregate.

=== Xerez ===
Maldonado was signed for an undisclosed fee by newly promoted Spanish La Liga club Xerez C.D. on 25 August 2009 after impressing for Atlante in the 2009 Peace Cup in Málaga, Spain. He made his league debut for Xerez on 30 August 2009 in a 2–0 loss to RCD Mallorca and left the club on 30 December 2009 to join his former club Atlante F.C.

=== Chivas ===
Maldonado was signed by Chivas USA during the summer transfer widow after spending two years with Atlante. He had three goals and one assist in league and Superliga. His contract option was declined after only scoring two goals in 10 appearances in league games.

=== Atlas ===
Maldonado was transferred on loan to Club Atlas on 5 December 2011. After long negotiations Maldonado was bought by Atlas on 20 December 2011 but had to give Ricardo Jimenez and Hebert Alferez transfers and some money to Atlante so the transfer could happen.

== International career ==
Having made a name for himself as a promising young attacker playing in the youth ranks of River Plate, the Uruguayan Football Association approached him to play at youth level for the Uruguay national team. Maldonado rejected the offers however and chose instead to play for Venezuela, his county of birth and to help the sport in Venezuela.

"I just felt the need to fight for my country and help their football to grow."

Maldonado, Venezuela's all-time leading goal scorer, made his debut for the national team on 20 August 2003 in a friendly against Haiti which finished 3–2 to Venezuela. He scored his first international goal for Venezuela on 9 February 2005 in a 3–0 win over Estonian national football team. He played for Venezuela in the Copa América 2007, scoring Venezuela's opening goal of the tournament in the 2–2 draw with Bolivia and helping them make it through the first round for the first time ever. Venezuela would later exit the tournament after losing 4–1 to Uruguay.

Maldonado scored the first goal in a historic match where Venezuela beat Brazil 2–0 in a friendly match played in front of 54,045 fans in Boston, USA. The result marked the first time Venezuela had ever recorded a victory against the Brazilians in 17 attempts.

Maldonado also played a key role in Venezuela's 2010 World Cup Qualification campaign, scoring 6 goals in 15 appearances.

== Managerial career ==
Maldonado began his managerial career with Mexican side Yalmakán in March 2023. On 18 July 2024, he was appointed manager of Portuguesa.

On 12 October 2025, Maldonado departed Portuguesa as his contract was due to expire. The following 12 March, he took over fellow top tier side Anzoátegui, but left by mutual consent on 27 August 2026.

== Personal life ==
He is the son of Carlos Maldonado (born 1963) who was also a professional football player. Maldonado was named after 1982 World Cup winning Italian midfielder Giancarlo Antognoni. His uncle Saúl Maldonado is also professional football manager, and his two cousins Javier and Andres also play professional football in Venezuela.

== Career statistics ==
=== Club ===
Accurate as of 14 September 2012

Club	Season	League		Cup		Continental		Total	
Club	Season	Apps	Goals	Apps	Goals	Apps	Goals	Apps	Goals
River Plate	2001	7	1					7	1
River Plate	2002	5	2					5	2
River Plate	Total	12	3					12	3
Nacional Táchira	2001–02	21	8					21	8
Nacional Táchira	Total	21	8					21	8
Mineros de Guayana	2002–03	31	5					31	5
Mineros de Guayana	Total	31	5					31	5
Maracaibo	2003–04								
Maracaibo	2004–05								
Maracaibo	2005–06								
Maracaibo	Total	35	27					35	27
O'Higgins	2006	16	8					16	8
O'Higgins	2007	16	8					16	8
O'Higgins	Total	32	16					32	16
Atlante	2007–08	26	22	5	3	0	0	31	25
Atlante	2008–09	27	5	4	1	6	2	37	8
Atlante	2009–10	15	1	0	0	0	0	15	1
Atlante	2010–11	15	4	2	1	0	0	17	5
Atlante	2011–12	12	5	0	0	0	0	12	5
Atlante	Total	95	37	11	5	6	2	112	44
Xerez (loan)	2009–10	9	0	1	1	0	0	10	1
Xerez (loan)	Total	9	0	1	1	0	0	10	1
Chivas USA (loan)	2010	10	2	1	0	0	0	11	2
Chivas USA (loan)	Total	10	2	1	0	0	0	11	2
Atlas	2011–12	16	2	0	0	0	0	16	2
Atlas	Total	16	2	0	0	0	0	16	2
Mineros de Guayana	2012–13	6	3	0	0	3	0	9	3
Mineros de Guayana	Total	6	3	0	0	3	0	9	3
Career totals		267	103	13	6	9	2	289	111

=== International goals ===
#	Date	Venue	Opponent	Score	Result	Competition
1.	9 February 2005	José Pachencho Romero, Maracaibo, Venezuela	Estonia	3–0	3–0	Friendly
2.	29 March 2005	Hernando Siles, La Paz, Bolivia	Bolivia	2–1	3–1	2006 FIFA World Cup qualification
3.	25 May 2005	Estadio Brígido Iriarte, Caracas, Venezuela	Panama	1–0	1–1	Friendly
4.	4 June 2005	José Pachencho Romero, Maracaibo, Venezuela	Uruguay	1–1	1–1	2006 FIFA World Cup qualification
5.	3 September 2005	José Pachencho Romero, Maracaibo, Venezuela	Peru	1–0	4–1	2006 FIFA World Cup qualification
6.	1 June 2007	José Pachencho Romero, Maracaibo, Venezuela	Canada	2–2	2–2	Friendly
7.	26 June 2007	Polideportivo Cachamay, Puerto Ordaz, Venezuela	Paraguay	2–2	3–2	Friendly
8.	8 September 2007	Pueblo Nuevo, Táchira, Venezuela	Bolivia	1–0	2–2	2007 Copa América
9.	12 September 2007	Estadio Olímpico José Antonio Anzoátegui, Puerto La Cruz, Venezuela	Panama	1–1	1–1	Friendly
10.	20 November 2007	Pueblo Nuevo, San Cristóbal, Venezuela	Bolivia	4–3	5–3	2010 FIFA World Cup qualification
11.	20 November 2007	Pueblo Nuevo, San Cristóbal, Venezuela	Bolivia	5–3	5–3	2010 FIFA World Cup qualification
12.	29 May 2008	Lockhart Stadium, Fort Lauderdale, United States	Honduras	1–1	1–1	Friendly
13.	6 June 2008	Gillette Stadium, Foxboro, United States	Brazil	0–1	0–2	Friendly
14.	19 June 2008	Estadio Olímpico José Antonio Anzoátegui, Puerto La Cruz, Venezuela	Chile	1–0	2–3	2010 FIFA World Cup qualification
15.	20 August 2008	Estadio Olímpico José Antonio Anzoátegui, Puerto La Cruz, Venezuela	Syria	2–0	4–1	Friendly
16.	15 October 2008	Estadio Olímpico José Antonio Anzoátegui, Puerto La Cruz, Venezuela	Ecuador	1–1	3–1	2010 FIFA World Cup qualification
17.	11 February 2009	Monumental de Maturín, Maturín, Venezuela	Guatemala	1–0	2–1	Friendly
18.	10 June 2009	Polideportivo Cachamay, Puerto Ordaz, Venezuela	Uruguay	1–0	2–2	2010 FIFA World Cup qualification
19.	5 September 2009	Monumental David Arellano, Santiago, Chile	Chile	1–1	2–2	2010 FIFA World Cup qualification
20.	17 November 2010	Estadio Olímpico Atahualpa, Quito, Ecuador	Ecuador	4–1	4–1	Friendly
21.	6 September 2011	Estadio Olímpico, Caracas, Venezuela	Guinea	1–0	2–1	Friendly
22.	6 September 2011	Estadio Olímpico, Caracas, Venezuela	Guinea	2–0	2–1	Friendly
Correct as of 7 October 2015

== Honours ==
=== Club ===
Nacional Táchira

- Primera División (1): 2001–02

Unión Atlético Maracaibo

- Primera División (1): 2003–04

Atlante

- Primera División de México (1): 2007 Apertura
- CONCACAF Champions League (1): 2008–09

=== International ===
- Copa América (1): Fourth place 2011

=== Individual ===
- Bota de Oro (1): 2007
