= Pedro Guiberguis =

Argentine footballer

Personal information
- Full name: Pedro Alberto Guiberguis
- Date of birth: July 26, 1969 (age 57)
- Place of birth: Libertador General San Martín, Argentina
- Height: 1.67 m (5 ft 6 in)
- Position: Central midfielder

Senior career*
Years	Team	Apps	(Gls)
1988–1998	Gimnasia y Tiro de Salta	250	(33)
1999	Gimnasia de Jujuy	19	(1)
2000	Barcelona SC	1	(0)
2000–2001	Wilstermann	54	(6)
2002–2005	Bolívar	138	(23)
2005–2006	Atlético Ledesma	22	(1)
- * Club domestic league appearances and goals as of July 13, 2009

Pedro Alberto Guiberguis (born July 26, 1969, in Libertador General San Martín, Jujuy) is a former Argentine football midfielder who played at professional level in Argentina, Bolivia and Ecuador.

== Club career ==
Guiberguis began his career in second division with Gimnasia y Tiro de Salta. While playing for Gimnasia, the team was promoted to first division in two occasions, the first in the 1993–94 season and later in the 1997-98 campaign. After a decade in Salta with 250 in all competitions, Guiberguis transferred to first division club Gimnasia y Esgrima de Jujuy where he played during 1999. The following year he moved to Ecuador, but after only one game with Barcelona from Guayaquil he left the club. From there he relocated to Bolivia, where he joined Wilstermann. With the aviadores he won the national title in 2000, and played in Copa Libertadores the next year.

In 2002 Bolívar acquired his rights. He was fundamental in the team structure as he helped the club collect two more titles in its rich history. During his spell with Bolívar, the team also reached the Copa Sudamericana 2004 finals, but lost to Argentine club Boca Juniors. In July 2005, Guiberguis announced his retirement from the professional activity. Shortly after he return to Argentina, and played a few more games for fourth division club Atlético Ledesma.

== Club titles ==
Season	Club	Title
2000	Wilstermann	Liga de Fútbol Profesional Boliviano
2002	Bolívar	Liga de Fútbol Profesional Boliviano
2004 (A)	Bolívar	Liga de Fútbol Profesional Boliviano
