= Rodolfo Plaza Montero =

Bolivian footballer (1909–1988)

Rodolfo Plaza Montero (27 July 1909 – 30 November 1988), nicknamed El Cabro, was the president of Club Bolívar as well as a former footballer.
