= 2002–03 in Venezuelan football =

The following article presents a summary of the 2002–2003 football season in Venezuela.

== Venezuela national team ==
Date	Venue	Opponents	Score	Comp	Venezuela scorers	Fixture
2002-08-21	Estadio Olímpico; Caracas, Venezuela	Bolivia	2 – 0	F	Noriega 19'; González 20'	195
2002-10-02	Estadio Olímpico; Caracas, Venezuela	Ecuador	2 – 0	F	Rey 29'; Moreno 81'	196
2002-11-02	Estadio Olímpico; Caracas, Venezuela	Uruguay	1 – 0	F	Páez 48'	197
2003-03-29	Seahawks Stadium; Seattle, United States	United States	2 – 0	F		198
2003-04-02	Estadio Olímpico; Caracas, Venezuela	Jamaica	2 – 0	F	Urdaneta 10' (pk); Páez 38'	199
2003-04-30	Estadio Pueblo Nuevo; San Cristóbal, Venezuela	Trinidad and Tobago	3 – 0	F	Arango 30' 39'; Noriega 75'	200
2003-06-07	Miami Orange Bowl; Miami, United States	Honduras	2 – 1	F	Urdaneta 14'; Arango 36'	201
2003-06-26	Miami Orange Bowl; Miami, United States	Peru	0 – 1	F		202
2003-07-03	Hasely Crawford Stadium; Port of Spain, Trinidad & Tobago	Trinidad and Tobago	2- 2	F	Cásseres 30' 49'	203
2003-07-26	Vicarage Road; Watford, United Kingdom	Nigeria	0 – 1	F		204
