= 2002 in Paraguayan football =

The following article presents a summary of the 2002 football (soccer) season in Paraguay.

== First division results ==
=== Torneo Apertura ===
The Apertura tournament was played in a single all-play-all system. At the end, the top eight teams qualified to a playoff stage to determine the Apertura champion.

Position	Team	Played	Wins	Draws	Losses	Scored	Conceded	Points
1	Sportivo Luqueño	9	7	1	1	15	7	22
2	12 de Octubre	9	6	1	2	9	4	19
3	Libertad	9	6	0	3	19	13	18
4	Cerro Porteño	9	5	0	4	17	15	15
5	Sport Colombia	9	4	2	3	23	13	14
6	Sol de América	9	4	1	4	13	13	13
7	Olimpia	9	3	2	4	13	15	11
8	Guaraní	9	3	0	6	14	19	9
9	San Lorenzo	9	0	4	5	7	14	4
10	Deportivo Recoleta	9	0	3	6	8	25	3

==== Apertura playoff stage ====
The top eight teams qualified to this stage.

===== Quarterfinals =====
Team 1	Agg.	Team 2	1st leg	2nd leg
Guaraní	4-1	Sportivo Luqueño	2-1	2-0
Olimpia	4-2	12 de Octubre	3-1	1-1
Sol de América	4-8	Libertad	3-3	1-5
Sport Colombia	1-3	Cerro Porteño	0-2	1-1

===== Semifinals =====
Team 1	Agg.	Team 2	1st leg	2nd leg
Cerro Porteño	0-0 (5 - 3 pen)	Olimpia	0-0	0-0
Guaraní	2-5	Libertad	1-1	1-4

===== Apertura final =====
Team 1	Agg.	Team 2	1st leg	2nd leg
Cerro Porteño	1-3	Libertad	0-3	1-0

Libertad wins the Apertura tournament final by an aggregate score of 3-1 on May 11, 2002.

=== Torneo Clausura ===
The Clausura tournament was played in a two-round all-play-all system, with the champion being the team with the most points at the end of the two rounds.

Position	Team	Played	Wins	Draws	Losses	Scored	Conceded	Points
1	12 de Octubre	18	10	2	6	30	24	32
2	Libertad	18	9	4	5	33	22	31
3	Olimpia	18	8	6	4	33	25	30
4	Sportivo Luqueño	18	7	6	5	19	17	27
5	Guaraní	18	7	5	6	29	26	26
6	Sport Colombia	18	8	2	8	23	27	26
7	Cerro Porteño	18	5	6	7	20	19	21
8	Recoleta	18	5	6	7	17	22	21
9	Sol de América	18	4	5	9	15	23	17
10	San Lorenzo	18	5	2	11	15	29	17

=== Championship game playoff ===
The national championship game was played between the Apertura and Clausura tournaments winners.

November 10, 2002

12 de Octubre	1–2	Libertad

November 17, 2002

Libertad	4–1	12 de Octubre

Libertad declared as national champions by aggregate score of 6-2.

=== Relegation / Promotion ===
- Recoleta automatically relegated to the second division after finishing last in the average points table based over a three-year period.

San Lorenzo finished second-to-last in the aggregate points table, so had to participate in the promotion play-off game against second division runners-up Club Presidente Hayes. San Lorenzo won the playoff game by an aggregate score of 4-3, so it remains in the first division.

- Tacuary promoted to the first division by winning the second division tournament.

=== Qualification to international competitions ===
- Libertad qualified to the 2003 Copa Libertadores by winning the Torneo Apertura.
- 12 de Octubre qualified to the 2003 Copa Libertadores by winning the Torneo Clausura.
- Olimpia qualified to the 2003 Copa Libertadores as holders of the 2002 edition.
- A four team playoff (based on best positions in the aggregate points table) was played to determine the 4th participant in the 2003 Copa Libertadores.

==== Pre-Libertadores playoff ====
Position	Team	Played	Wins	Draws	Losses	Scored	Conceded	Points
1	Cerro Porteño	3	2	1	0	9	4	7
2	Guaraní	3	2	0	1	5	4	6
3	Sport Colombia	3	0	2	1	5	6	2
4	Sportivo Luqueño	3	0	1	2	4	9	1

- Cerro Porteño qualifies to the 2003 Copa Libertadores by winning the Pre-Libertadores tournament.

== Lower divisions results ==
Level	Tournament	Champion
2nd	Intermedia	Tacuary
3rd (G.A. teams)	Primera de Ascenso	Sportivo Trinidense
3rd (interior teams)	UFI Champions Cup	Cerro Porteño PF (Presidente Franco)
4th (G.A. teams)	Segunda de Ascenso	General Caballero (San Felipe)

== Paraguayan teams in international competitions ==
- Intercontinental Cup
  - Olimpia: runners-up
- Copa Libertadores 2002:
  - Olimpia: Champions
  - Cerro Porteño: group-stage
  - 12 de Octubre: group-stage
- Copa Sudamericana 2002:
  - Libertad: preliminary second round
  - Cerro Porteño: preliminary first round

== Paraguay national team ==
The following table lists all the games played by the Paraguay national football team in official competitions during 2002.

Date	Venue	Opponents	Score	Comp	Paraguay scorers	Report
June 2, 2002	Asiad Main Stadium; Busan	South Africa	2 - 2	World Cup	Santa Cruz 39'; Arce 55'	Report
June 7, 2002	Jeonju World Cup Stadium; Jeonju	Spain	3 - 1	World Cup	Puyol 10' (o.g.)	Report
June 12, 2002	Jeju World Cup Stadium; Seogwipo	Slovenia	1 - 3	World Cup	Cuevas 65', 84'; Campos 73'	Report
June 15, 2002	Jeju World Cup Stadium; Seogwipo	Germany	0 - 1	World Cup	-	Report
September 19, 2002	Takhti Stadium; Tabriz	Iran	1 - 1 (4–3 pen)	2002 LG Cup	Bareiro 35'	Report
