= Mauro Machado =

Brazilian footballer

Mauro Machado da Silva (born 22 January 1975 in Porto Alegre, Brazil) is a Retired Brazilian footballer who is currently goal keeping coach at Bolívar in the Bolivian Professional Football League.

== Teams ==
- (Bolivia) Mariscal Braun 2001
- (Bolivia) Bolívar 2002-2005
- (Brazil) SC Ulbra 2006
- (Brazil) Madureira 2007
- (Bolivia) La Paz FC 2007-2008
- (Bolivia) Real Potosí 2009-2010
- (Bolivia) Jorge Wilstermann 2011-2012
- (Bolivia) Aurora 2013

== Goalkeeping Coaching Career ==
- (Chile) Club Deportivo Universidad Católica 2018
- (United Arab Emirates) Al-Nasr 2019
- (Belgium) KAS Eupen 2019-2021
- (Mexico) Mazatlán 2021-2023
- (Mexico) Querétaro 2023-2025
- (Cambodia) MOI Kompong Dewa 2026-

== Titles ==
- (Bolivia) Bolívar 2002 (Bolivian Primera División Championship), 2004 (Torneo Apertura), 2005 (Torneo Adecuación)
- (Bolivia) Real Potosí 2009 (Playoffs Bolivian Primera División Championship)
