= 2002 Copa Sudamericana =

2002 Copa Sudamericana de Clubes

Tournament details
- Dates: August 28 - December 11
- Teams: 21 (from 9 associations)

Final positions
- Champions: (Argentina) San Lorenzo (1st title)
- Runners-up: (Colombia) Atlético Nacional

Tournament statistics
- Matches played: 40
- Goals scored: 98 (2.45 per match)
- Top scorer(s): (Argentina) Rodrigo Astudillo (4) (Bolivia) Gonzalo Galindo (4) (Cameroon) Pierre Webó (4)

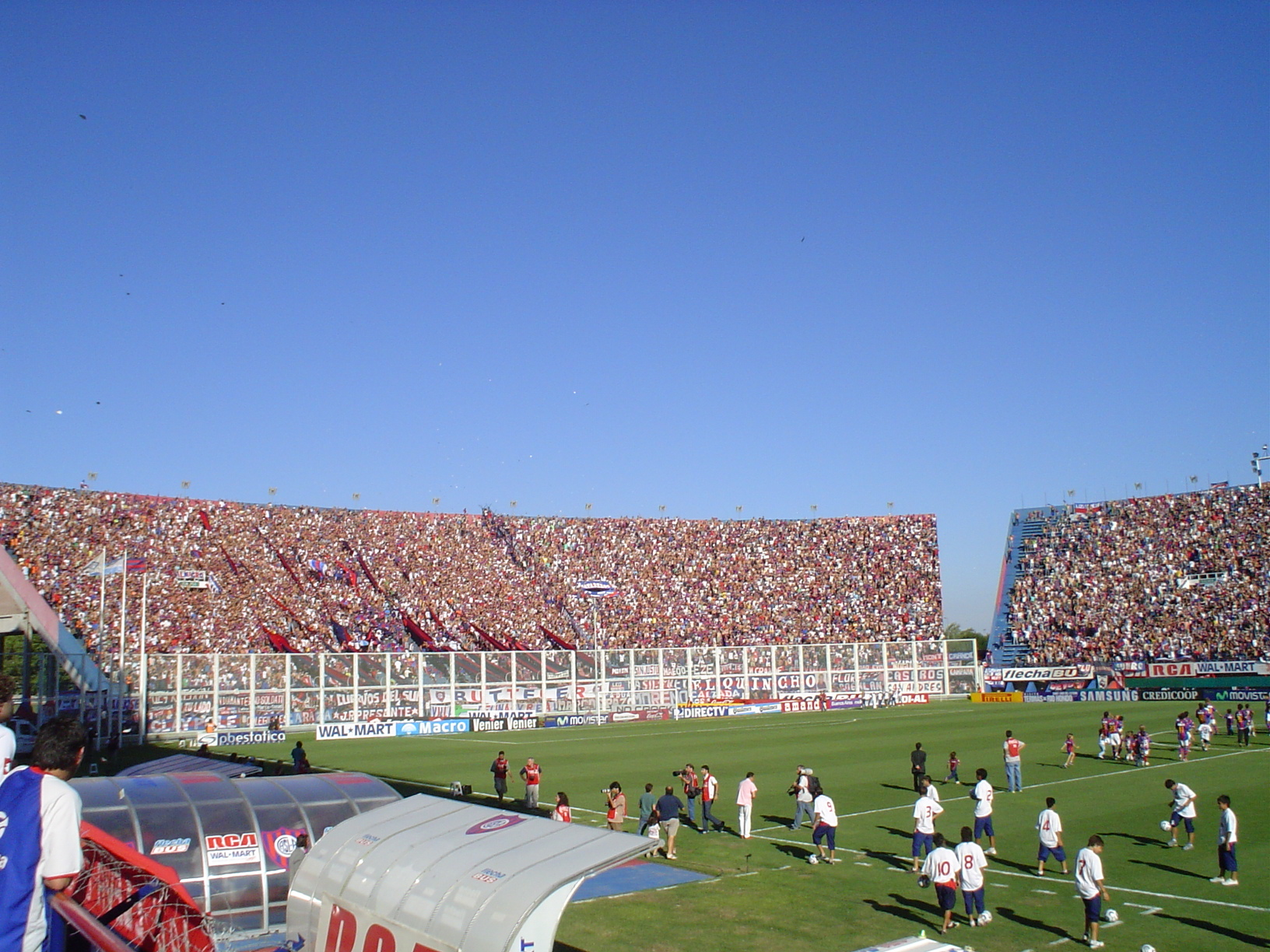
San Lorenzo de Almagro Stadium, in Buenos Aires, Argentina

The 2002 Copa Sudamericana was the inaugural Copa Sudamericana, a club association football tournament organized by CONMEBOL. It took place between August 28 and December 11. After the failure in creating a Pan-American Cup to be played among teams from the entire American continent, CONMEBOL decided to create another tournament bearing the continent's name. Nine association's clubs entered the first competition, with one not sending a representative; Brazilian clubs did not participate due to the late organization of the tournament and schedule conflicts.

The first match of the competition took place between Venezuelan sides Deportivo Táchira and Monagas in San Cristóbal, Venezuela. During the match, Carlos Bravo became the first player to score a goal in the competition. Pierre Webó, a player from Cameroon playing for Nacional, became the first non-South American topscorer of any South American tournament. San Lorenzo, invited for being the winners of the 2001 Copa Mercosur, won the competition after thrashing Atlético Nacional 4–0 on aggregate and became the first winners of the Copa Sudamericana.

== Qualified teams ==
Association	Team	Qualification method
(Argentina) Argentina; 4 + 1 berths	San Lorenzo	2001 Copa Mercosur champion
(Argentina) Argentina; 4 + 1 berths	Racing (Argentina 1)	2001 Apertura champion
(Argentina) Argentina; 4 + 1 berths	River Plate (Argentina 2)	2002 Clausura champion
(Argentina) Argentina; 4 + 1 berths	Boca Juniors (Argentina 3)	Best 2001–02 average among non-champions
(Argentina) Argentina; 4 + 1 berths	Gimnasia y Esgrima (Argentina 4)	Second best 2001–02 average among non-champions
(Bolivia) Bolivia; 2 berths	Oriente Petrolero (Bolivia 1)	2001 Liga de Fútbol champion
(Bolivia) Bolivia; 2 berths	Bolívar (Bolivia 2)	2001 Liga de Fútbol runner-up
(Chile) Chile; 2 berths	Cobreloa (Chile 1)	2002 Liguilla Pre-Sudamericana winner
(Chile) Chile; 2 berths	Santiago Wanderers (Chile 2)	2002 Liguilla Pre-Sudamericana winner
(Colombia) Colombia; 2 berths	América de Cali (Colombia 1)	2002 Apertura champion
(Colombia) Colombia; 2 berths	Atlético Nacional (Colombia 2)	2002 Apertura runner-up
(Ecuador) Ecuador; 2 berths	Barcelona (Ecuador 1)	2002 First Stage winner
(Ecuador) Ecuador; 2 berths	Aucas (Ecuador 2)	2002 First Stage runner-up
(Paraguay) Paraguay; 2 berths	Cerro Porteño (Paraguay 1)	2002 Apertura champion
(Paraguay) Paraguay; 2 berths	Libertad (Paraguay 2)	2002 First Stage winner
(Peru) Peru; 2 berths	Universitario (Peru 1)	2002 Apertura champion
(Peru) Peru; 2 berths	Alianza Lima (Peru 2)	2002 Apertura runner-up
(Uruguay) Uruguay; 2 berths	Nacional (Uruguay 1)	2001 Primera División champion
(Uruguay) Uruguay; 2 berths	Danubio (Uruguay 2)	2001 Primera División runner-up
(Venezuela) Venezuela; 2 berths	Deportivo Táchira (Venezuela 1)	2002 Clausura champion
(Venezuela) Venezuela; 2 berths	Monagas (Venezuela 2)	2002 Clausura runner-up

== First stage ==
Team 1	Agg.	Team 2	1st leg	2nd leg
Deportivo Táchira (Venezuela)	0–5	(Venezuela) Monagas	0–2	0–3
Aucas (Ecuador)	1–3	(Ecuador) Barcelona	1–2	0–1
Alianza Lima (Peru)	2–0	(Peru) Universitario	1–0	1–0
Bolívar (Bolivia)	4–3	(Bolivia) Oriente Petrolero	4–2	0–1
Cerro Porteño (Paraguay)	0–3	(Paraguay) Libertad	0–1	0–2

== Second stage ==
Team 1	Agg.	Team 2	1st leg	2nd leg
Quarterfinalist 1
Racing (Argentina)	1–0	(Argentina) River Plate	1–0	0–0
Quarterfinalist 3
Gimnasia y Esgrima (Argentina)	3–1	(Argentina) Boca Juniors	3–1	0–0
Quarterfinalist 5
Danubio (Uruguay)	1–3	(Uruguay) Nacional	1–1	0–2
Quarterfinalist 2
Monagas (Venezuela)	1–8	(Argentina) San Lorenzo	0–3	1–5
Quarterfinalist 7
Cobreloa (Chile)	2–4	(Chile) Santiago Wanderers	0–1	2–3
Quarterfinalist 6
Barcelona (Ecuador)	2–2 (5–6 p)	(Peru) Alianza Lima	1–0	1–2
Quarterfinalist 4
Bolívar (Bolivia)	3–1	(Paraguay) Libertad	2–0	1–1
Quarterfinalist 8
Atlético Nacional (Colombia)	3–1	(Colombia) América de Cali	1–0	2–1

== Final stages ==
Teams from the Quarterfinals onwards will be seeded depending on which First Round tie they win (i.e. the winner of Match D1 will have the 1 seed).

Quarterfinals
(Argentina) Racing	1	2	3 (3)
(Argentina) San Lorenzo	3	0	3 (4)
(Argentina) Gimnasia y Esgrima	1	2	3
(Bolivia) Bolívar	4	0	4
(Uruguay) Nacional	0	3	3
(Peru) Alianza Lima	1	1	2
(Chile) Santiago Wanderers	1	1	2 (5)
(Colombia) Atlético Nacional	2	0	2 (6)

Semifinals
(Argentina) San Lorenzo	1	4	5
(Bolivia) Bolívar	2	2	4
(Uruguay) Nacional	1	2	3 (3)
(Colombia) Atlético Nacional	2	1	3 (5)

Finals
(Argentina) San Lorenzo	4	0	4
(Colombia) Atlético Nacional	0	0	0

=== Quarterfinals ===
Eight teams advanced to the quarterfinals from the first round. The first leg of the quarterfinals took place the week of October 1, with the second leg taking place the week of October 30. In each tie, the team with the higher seed will play at home in the second leg.

Team 1	Agg.	Team 2	1st leg	2nd leg
Alianza Lima (Peru)	2–3	(Uruguay) Nacional	1–0	1–3
San Lorenzo (Argentina)	3–3 (4–3 p)	(Argentina) Racing	3–1	0–2
Atlético Nacional (Colombia)	2–2 (6–5 p)	(Chile) Santiago Wanderers	2–1	0–1
Bolívar (Bolivia)	4–3	(Argentina) Gimnasia y Esgrima	4–1	0–2

=== Semifinals ===
The first leg of the semifinals took place the week of November 5, with the second leg taking place the week of November 13.

Team 1	Agg.	Team 2	1st leg	2nd leg
Bolívar (Bolivia)	4–5	(Argentina) San Lorenzo	2–1	2–4
Atlético Nacional (Colombia)	3–3 (5–3 p)	(Uruguay) Nacional	2–1	1–2

=== Finals ===
In the finals, if the finalists are tied on points after the culmination of the second leg, the winner will be the team who scored the most goals. If they are tied on goals, the game will move onto a penalty shootout if necessary.

November 27, 2002
19:10 (UTC−3)

Atlético Nacional (Colombia)	0–4	(Argentina) San Lorenzo
	Report	Saja 2' (pen.); Michelini 25'; Romagnoli 52'; Astudillo 67'

Estadio Atanasio Girardot, Medellín
Attendance: 45,000
Referee: Márcio Rezende (Brazil)

December 11, 2002
21:10 (UTC−3)

San Lorenzo (Argentina)	0–0	(Colombia) Atlético Nacional
	Report

Estadio Pedro Bidegain, Buenos Aires
Attendance: 40,779
Referee: Epifanio González (Paraguay)
