= Jorge Habegger =

Argentine football manager

Jorge Habegger (born 19 October 1946) is an Argentinian football coach.

== Career ==
Habegger started his career as coach in Colombia. He has trained clubs in Argentina, Bolivia, Saudi Arabia, Ecuador and Guatemala.
