= Club Bolívar =

Association football club in Bolivia

Bolívar
- Full name: Club Bolívar
- Nicknames: La Academia (The Academy); El Rey de Copas (The King of Cups); El Más Grande (The Biggest One); Los Celestes (The Sky Blues)
- Founded: 12 April 1925; 100 years ago
- Ground: Estadio Hernando Siles; Estadio Libertador Simón Bolívar; La Paz, Bolivia
- Capacity: 41,143
- Owner: Marcelo Claure
- Chairman: Marcelo Claure
- Manager: Alejandro Restrepo
- League: División Profesional
- 2025: División Profesional, 2nd of 16
- Website: http://www.clubbolivar.com
Home colours	Away colours	Third colours

Clubs owned by CFG Listed in order of acquisition/foundation. Bold indicates the club was founded by CFG. * indicates the club was acquired by CFG. § indicates the club is co-owned. † indicates the club is no longer owned by CFG.
2008	(England) Manchester City*
2009–2012
2013	(United States) **New York City FC**^{§}
2014	(Australia) Melbourne City*
2014	(Japan) Yokohama F. Marinos*^{†}
2015–2016
2017	(Uruguay) Montevideo City*
2017	(Spain) Girona*^{§}
2018
2019	(China) Shenzhen Peng City*^{§}
2019	(India) Mumbai City^{†}
2020	(Belgium) Lommel*
2020	(France) Troyes*
2021
2022	(Italy) Palermo*^{§}
2023	(Brazil) Bahia*^{§}

Club Bolívar (Spanish pronunciation: [kluβ boˈliβaɾ]) is a Bolivian professional football club that currently plays in the Bolivian Primera División. Founded in 1925 in honor of military leader Simón Bolívar, the club has used light blue kits throughout its history, which is why it is nicknamed "Los Celestes" (The Sky Blues).

The club has two stadiums; Estadio Libertador Simón Bolívar, which has a capacity for 5,000 people and is located in the Tembladerani neighborhood of La Paz, is only used for training sessions and friendly matches. Estadio Hernando Siles, which holds a capacity for 41,143 people, is the club's main stadium, and is used for official matches.

Bolívar began playing the amateur era two years after its foundation, in 1927, and in the 1932 tournament the club won its first championship title.

In the professional era, the club won the first tournament of the Bolivian Primera División in 1950, and since then has won 31 league titles, making it the most successful Bolivian football club. According to International Federation of Football History & Statistics (IFFHS) statistics, Club Bolívar is the best Bolivian football team of the 20th century and the first decade of the 21st century.

At an international level, Club Bolívar is statistically the club that has best represented Bolivia in international tournaments. The Bolivian club is in the 8th position of the Historical table of the Copa Libertadores; it has participated 40 times in this tournament, being in this way the seventh team at the South American level with the most participations and also the ninth team with most victories in the history of the Libertadores, 108 victories. Among its 40 appearances in the Copa Libertadores, its best performances were in the 1986 and 2014 editions, where Bolivar finished as a semi-finalist, and as of today is the only Bolivian club to reach this stage.

Bolívar played its first international final in 2004, where it was runner-up to Boca Juniors in that year's Copa Sudamericana. Bolivar has 12 participations in this tournament, and is the only Bolivian team to reach the final (although it was the second Bolivian club to do so, following Mariscal Santa Cruz, which won the Recopa Sudamericana de Clubes in 1970.) In the historical table for the tournament, Bolivar is ranked 20th.

Among the best players in Bolivar's history are Marco "El Diablo" Etcheverry, Erwin Sanchez, Julio Baldivieso, Carlos Borja, Vladimir Soria, Ramiro Blacut, Víctor Ugarte, Carlos Aragones, Juan Miguel "Juanmi" Callejon, Walter Flores, Juan Carlos Arce, Joaquín Botero and many more.

== History ==
=== Foundation ===
Until well into the 1980s there was controversy regarding the club's foundation date. The year 1927 was considered accurate until it became clear that it had been founded in 1925, the year of the country's centenary.

The club was born on 12 April 1925, by a group of friends who had the idea of forming a social club whose objective was to practice sport, especially football. They met in a modest colonial house in La Paz, specifically on Junín street and less than two blocks from Plaza Murillo, where it was decided to create the club with an unusual name, Bolívar. This was contrary to the usual names of Bolivian teams back then, as most of them were created with English names. Names such as Franz Tamayo or Antonio José de Sucre were considered, but in homage to the Liberator Simón Bolívar, the group decided on the name Bolívar.

Despite the fact that the founders had as a dominant passion for the practice of football, as was the style at the time, they decided to add the additional denominative of "musical literary club"; that is, the club was originally founded with the name of "Club Atlético Literario Musical Bolívar" which was soon diluted by the strength of the football team and its distinctive achievements, being reduced only to Club Bolívar.

Don Humberto Bonifacio was in charge of the club's management on a provisional basis, until the first president was elected by a democratic election. The first president was Carlos Terán, who was accompanied by Ernesto Sainz, Héctor Salcedo, Rafael Navarro, and Felipe Gutiérrez.

=== Amateur era ===
In 1927, two years after its founding, Club Bolívar officially enrolled in La Paz Fútbol Association. This would be the first time Bolivar participated in an official championship, where the club finished runner-up behind Nimbles Sport.

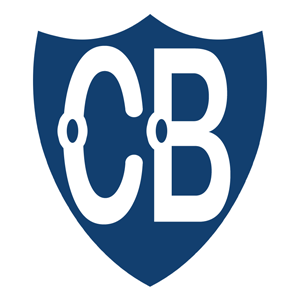
First emblem of the club

The club's first international friendly match was played on 3 June 1927, against Coquimbo Unido of Chile in La Paz, losing 2–1.

Bolívar was the first Bolivian team to make an international tour and play outside Bolivia. In December 1930 and January 1931, the team played five matches in Chile. In 1931 the tournament was fulfilled with poor performances by teams that did not have good youth divisions, limiting the championship to only four teams. That same year, on 8 July, Bolívar obtained its first international victory against Gimnasia y Tiro de Salta, winning 2–1 in La Paz.

A fundamental event in this first part of the club's history occurred in 1932 when Bolívar achieved the first championship in its history played in two series. The captain of that Bolívar squad was Mario Alborta, who was also captain of the Bolivia national team. The contest began on May 26, but had to be suspended for a month due to the events of the Chaco War between Bolivia and Paraguay, more specifically the Battle of Boquerón, which was fought from 7–29 September. The La Paz Football Association established that the location and score of the moment were recognized in the final table. For this reason, Club Bolívar was declared champion of that year.

In the following two years, 1933 and 1934, the tournaments were suspended until the end of the war event facing the country. After the war, the championship was restarted a year later, in 1935. The team was champion for the second time in 1937.

Bolívar won a four-time championship, winning back-to-back titles from 1939 to 1942. That team was led by players like Walter Saavedra, Nicolas Terrazas, Guillermo Baldellón, Germán Huaranca, Rodolfo Plaza Montero, Alfredo "Guardiaco" Molina, and Hernán Rojas.

1947 is an important year for Bolívar and for Bolivian football, because of winger Víctor Agustín Ugarte's debut with the club. He made his debut against Ferroviario and that same year he debuted in the Bolivia national team. Many people consider him the best Bolivian player in history.

=== Professional era ===
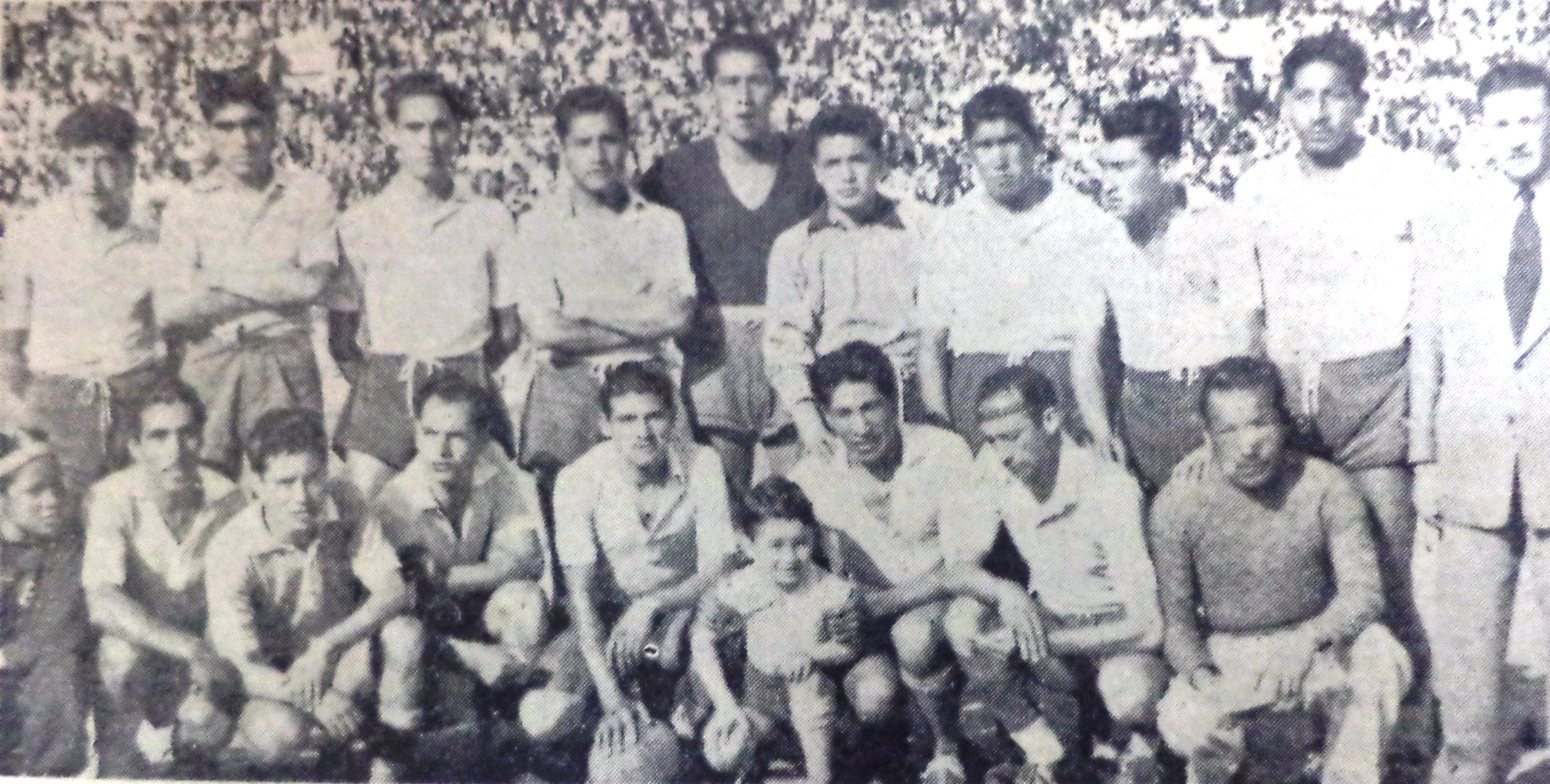
Bolívar won the first professional title of 1950.

In 1950, the Asociación de Fútbol de La Paz became professional, and Bolívar was the first champion of the now professional league. Under the presidency of Armando Gamarra and under the leadership of Víctor Agustín Ugarte, Mario Mena and the participation of players like Argentine Ramón Guillermo Santos, it was crowned champion after a 3-0 victory over Litoral.

With José Fiorilo they won the 1953 title, and for the first time a team achieved the professional title undefeated with 11 victories and a whopping 40 goals in 14 matches.

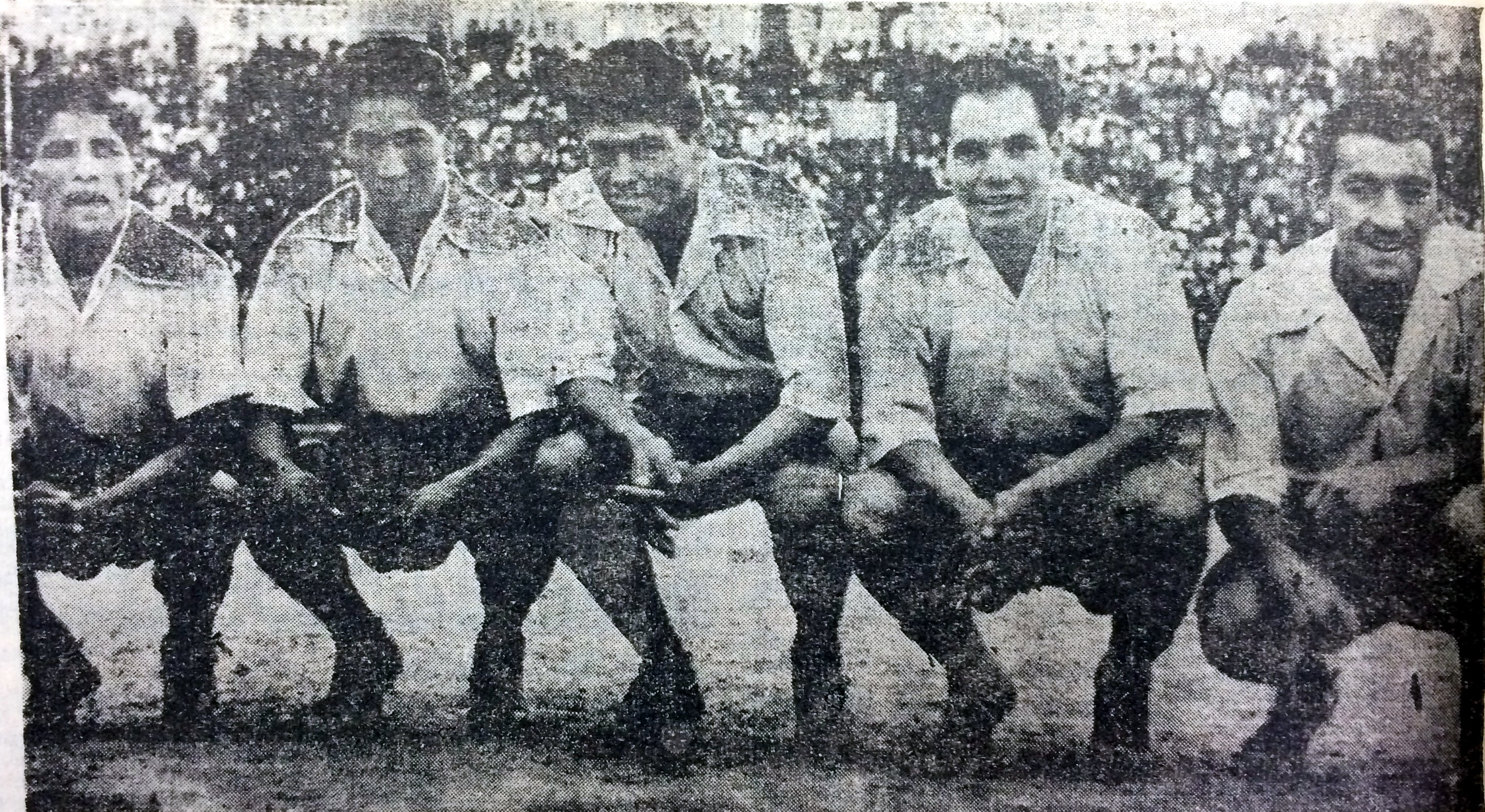
What was then known as the "Vanguardia" of the Bolivar team that won the title in 1953. From left to right: Montoya, Ugarte. Albornoz, Mena and M. Vargas.

This success was repeated by winning the integrated championship of 1956. That same year, Rodolfo Plaza Montero became the club's new manager and president. He is the only former player of the institution who was also president.

The unforgettable match of their international friendlies was played on 14 January 1956 in La Paz when they defeated Argentine club River Plate with a historic score of 7–2. Los Millonarios had high-profile players such as Amadeo Carrizo, Néstor Rossi, Santiago Vernazza, Omar Sívori, and Ángel Labruna.

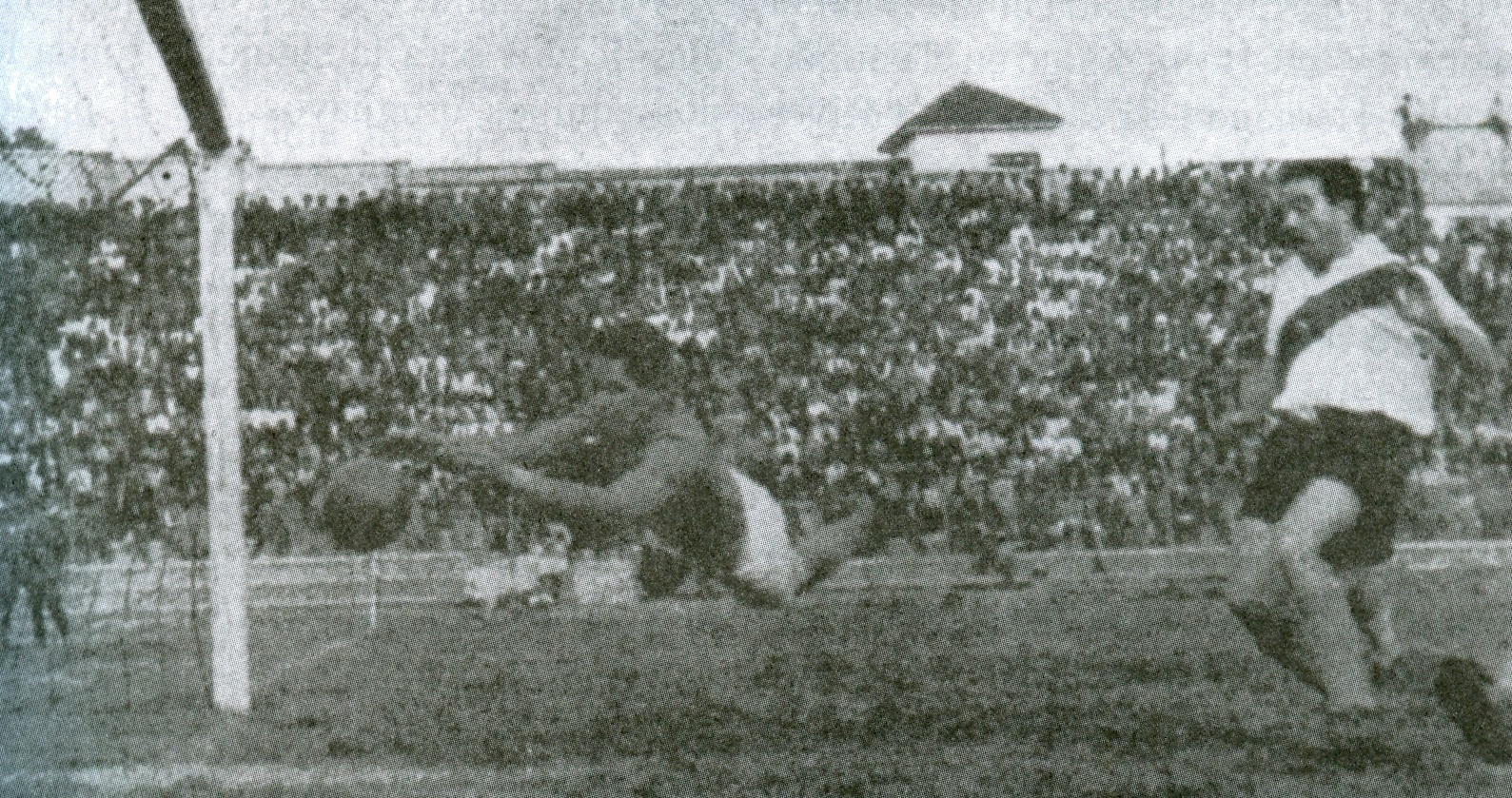
Bolívar's historic victory against River Plate (7–2) in January 1956

Bolivar's worst season in its history was in 1964, when a poor campaign led to relegation against a newly promoted team, Universitario de La Paz, which beat Bolívar 2–1. The club won the 1965 second division season undefeated and made an immediate return to the Primera Division.

The following season, they won the league title and qualified to their first ever Copa Libertadores for the 1967 edition. Their first match in the Libertadores was on 12 March, a 1-0 win against 31 de Octubre. Their first away win was on 10 May, a 2-1 win against Independiente Santa Fe in Bogota. They eventually placed fourth out of six in their group with two wins four draws and four defeats.

In 1968, Bolívar won its first title under the presidency of Mario Mercado Vaca. In 1976 they won their last title before the professional league era. On 21 January 1995, Mario Mercado died when his private jet crashed in Oruro en route to Sucre. Aside from football, he was also mayor of the city of La Paz. Under his management, Estadio Hernando Siles was renovated and Estadio Libertador, the club's reserve stadium, was opened in January 1976.

=== Liga Era ===
On 23 August 1977, 16 clubs from across the country decided to create the Bolivian Professional Football League. The birth of the league marked the beginning of a new era in Bolivian football commonly known as the Liga Era.

In 1978 the club won their first title after the professional league era began, finishing first in both the first and second stages before beating Wilstermann 1–0 in the final match. In 1979 they won a minor official competition called Copa Liga.

In the 1980s, they won 5 league titles, going back to back between 1982-1983 and 1987-1988, with the 1985 title in between.

In 1986, they reached the Copa Libertadores semi-finals, with Bolivar comfortably winning all three home matches: 2-0 against Wilstermann, 4-0 against Universitario, and 2-1 against Cajamarca, topping their group and qualifying for the next round. The team's debut in the next round was a 3-1 loss in Asuncion, followed by a 2-0 win against America in La Paz. The defining match took place in Cali, where Bolívar initially led thanks to a goal by Peruvian player Jorge "Coqui" Hirano. However, America equalized soon after, and Ricardo Gareca scored the winner for América. Bolivar needed a win to reach the finals, but only managed a 1-1 draw against Olimpia.

In the 1990s, the club added five more titles, winning in 1991, 1992, 1994, 1996 and 1997. Also in the 90's the club participated in the 1996 Copa CONMEBOL but lost 4-2 on aggregate to Lanus in the first stage.

The most notable achievements during this era were reaching the 1986 Copa Libertadores semi-finals, and winning a total of ten titles in fifteen years between 1982 and 1997, which cemented their status as one of the biggest clubs in Bolivia.

=== Mauro Cuellar and BAISA era ===
In the early 2000s, Mauro Cuellar assumed the presidency of Bolívar.

In 2002, Bolivar reached the semi-finals of the inaugural edition of the Copa Sudamericana, their second ever qualification to a semi-final of a continental competition. They began their campaign by beating another Bolivian club, Oriente Petrolero, over two legs. In the second round, they beat Club Libertad, one of the biggest clubs in Paraguay. In the first leg of the quarter-finals against Gimnasia y Esgrima La Plata, Bolivar won 4-1 at home. Bolivar lost the second leg in La Plata 2-0, but qualified to the semi finals 4-3 on aggregate. In the semifinals they were paired with San Lorenzo; Bolivar won the first leg in La Paz 2-1, but in Buenos Aires San Lorenzo won 4-2 and eliminated Bolivar 5-4 on aggregate. Although Bolivar were eliminated, they gained the respect of many, because San Lorenzo later won the competition and Bolivar was one of the few clubs to beat the champion.

Two years later, Bolivar had another deep run in the Copa Sudamericana, reaching the finals of the 2004 Copa Sudamericana against Argentine powerhouse Boca Juniors. In their first matchup, they disposed of fellow Bolivian club Aurora in the preliminary round, then defeated Chilean club University of Concepción, disposed of Argentine club Arsenal de Sarandí in the quarter-finals despite having lost the first leg in Argentina 1–0, and reached their first international final after beating Ecuadorian club LDU Quito 3–2 on aggregate. In the first leg of the finals at home, Bolivar won 1–0 with a goal from Argentine striker Horacio Chiorazzo. However, in the second leg at La Bombonera, Boca made a comeback and won the match 2–0 with goals from Martín Palermo and Carlos Tevez in the first half hour of the match, with Bolivar launching an attacking strategy in the second half where they had a shot hit the crossbar, being very close to tying the aggregate score. Despite the loss, Bolivar gained the respect of many and put Bolivia on the map, also being the only team to beat the winners of the competition. Also that year, Bolivar won their 19th title by clinching the Apertura championship.

However, despite the club's sporting achievements, adding league titles in 2005 and 2006, it fell into a deep financial crisis, nearly disappearing with debts in excess of US$5 million, until Bolivian millionaire Marcelo Claure took over the club in September 2008 through BAISA, a subsidiary company owned by Claure. BAISA owns the right to operate the club for 20 years. The financial crisis also slightly affected their performance on the field; Bolivar failed to win the title for 30 months, and failed to finish in the top three for three consecutive tournaments. The first title the club won under BAISA was the 2009 Apertura, their 22nd title in history.

In 2014, under the lead of Spanish coach Xabier Azkargorta, the team reached the Copa Libertadores semi-finals. The team began the campaign with a 2-1 loss in Ecuador against Emelec. Their next match was a 1-1 draw against Club Leon in La Paz. The team won its last three games; a 1-0 victory at home against Flamengo, a 1-0 victory on Mexican soil against Club Leon, and in the last matchday a 2-1 victory against Emelec, qualified the club to the following round. Bolivar eliminated Club León in the round of 16 on away goals and 2013 Copa Sudamericana champions Lanus in the quarter finals, to set-up a semi-final matchup with San Lorenzo. The first leg of the semi-finals at Nuevo Gasómetro ended with a heavy 5–0 loss, but Bolivar won the second leg at home 1–0, being eliminated 5–1 on aggregate by the eventual champions of the competition, but also being one of the few clubs to have beaten the champion, similar to what happened in 2004.

In 2017, Bolivar won both Apertura and Clausura tournaments that year, therefore completing a "bicampeonato" (two-time consecutive championship). This was their first "bicampeonato" in the modern Apertura-Clausura format.

In January 2021, Club Bolivar was announced as the first Partner Club of City Football Group. Also in January 2021, the club's "Plan Centenario" was announced, which is a five-year plan to construct an academy, open the club's ownership to fans, and win a "tricampeonato" (three-time consecutive championship) or reach a CONMEBOL final, all by 2025, the club's centenary year.

In 2023, Bolivar had a notable participation in that year's Copa Libertadores, finishing second in their group which included a 3-1 victory over Palmeiras at home and a notable 4-0 away victory against Cerro Porteño. In the round of 16 they achieved an incredible upset after defeating 2022 Copa Libertadores runner-up Athletico Paranaense on penalties, later losing to Internacional.

== Kit ==
=== Colors ===
Bolivar's traditional home colors are light blue, traditional away colors are dark blue or white.

Kit Manufacturers
Year	Manufacturer
1978-1982	Adidas
1983-1989	Penalty
1990	Topper
1991-1994	El Palacio de las Gorras
1994-1997	Penalty
1998	Nike
1999	Gav Sport
2000-2002	Puma
2003-2006	Adidas
2006-2009	Umbro
2010-2011	In-house
2011-2013	Admiral Sportswear
2014-2016	Marathon Sports
2016-2021	Joma
2021-	Puma

Shirt Sponsors
Year	Sponsor
1982	Iberia
1983	Tasca
1984-87	Banco de la Paz
1988	Paceña
1989	Parillada Caminito
1990	Duralit
1991-92	Banco de La Paz
1993	Pacena
1994-95	Entel
1996	Ultima Hora
1997	Caterpillar
1998-2000	Taquiña
2001-07	Coca-Cola
2008-09	Entel
2010-14	Samsung
2015-16	Huawei
2017-19	Samsung
2019-	Chevrolet

== Rivalries ==
Bolivar's classic rival is The Strongest. Matches between them are known as the Bolivian derby, or Clásico Paceño. It is considered the most important football derby in the country. Bolívar and The Strongest are one of the oldest and strongest teams of the league, both from the administrative capital of Bolivia, La Paz; hence the name Paceño.

The first official Bolivian derby in history was played on 17 October 1927, a match which ended 0–0.

The rivalry has been ranked as one of the most popular in South American football.

Bolivar currently leads the series in wins, with 164 compared to The Strongest's 103. In December 2004, The Strongest secured a historic 7-0 win over their rivals — the biggest margin of victory ever recorded in the rivalry.

The club also has some minor rivalries with clubs from Santa Cruz de la Sierra, such as Oriente Petrolero and Blooming, and Jorge Wilstermann from Cochabamba. Matches between these clubs usually gather lots of attention throughout the country.

== Honours ==
Club Bolívar honours
Type	Competition	Titles	Seasons
**National**	Bolivian Primera División	**31**	1950, 1953, 1956, 1966, 1968, 1976, 1978, 1982, 1983, 1985, 1987, 1988, 1991, 1992, 1994, 1996, 1997, 2002, 2004-A, 2005-AD, 2006-C, 2009-A, 2011-AD, 2013-C, 2014-A, 2015-C, 2017-A, 2017-C, 2019-A, 2022-A, 2024
**National**	Copa Liga	**1**	1979
**National**	Copa de la División Profesional	**1**	2023

- record

=== International ===
- **Copa Sudamericana**
  - Runners-up (1): 2004

=== Regional ===
- **Campeonato Paceño**
  - Winners (13): 1932, 1937, 1939, 1940, 1941, 1942, 1950, 1953, 1956, 1966, 1967, 1969, 1976
- **Campeonato de Honor**
  - Winners (1): 1942
- **Campeonato de 2.ª Categoría**
  - Winners (1): 1965

== Current squad ==
As of 9 August 2026

Note: Flags indicate national team as defined under FIFA eligibility rules; some limited exceptions apply. Players may hold more than one non-FIFA nationality.

No.	Pos.	Nation	Player
1	GK	BOL	Carlos Lampe (vice-captain)
2	DF	BOL	Jesús Sagredo
3	DF	ECU	Xavier Arreaga
4	DF	BOL	José Sagredo
5	DF	ARG	Santiago Echeverría
6	MF	BOL	Ervin Vaca
7	MF	BOL	Jhon Velásquez
8	DF	BOL	Luis Paz
9	FW	URU	Martín Cauteruccio
10	FW	ECU	Billy Arce
11	FW	BOL	Bruno Miranda
12	GK	BOL	Juan José Lopez
13	GK	BOL	Diego Méndez
14	MF	BOL	Robson Matheus
16	DF	BOL	Leonardo Zabala (on loan from Cancún)

No.	Pos.	Nation	Player
17	FW	ARG	Patito Rodríguez
18	MF	BOL	Lucas Chávez
19	MF	BOL	John García
20	MF	BOL	Carlos Sejas
22	MF	BOL	Anderson Ayhuana
23	MF	BOL	Leonel Justiniano (captain)
24	MF	BOL	Matías Galindo
26	MF	BOL	Erwin Saavedra
27	FW	COL	Dairon Asprilla
31	DF	BOL	Heiden Butrón
33	DF	BOL	Fernando Mena
35	DF	BOL	Escleizon Freita
77	FW	DOM	Dorny Romero
80	MF	BOL	Carlos Melgar
99	FW	ARG	Damián Batallini (on loan from Argentinos Juniors)

=== Reserve team ===
Note: Flags indicate national team as defined under FIFA eligibility rules; some limited exceptions apply. Players may hold more than one non-FIFA nationality.

No.	Pos.	Nation	Player

=== Out on loan ===
Note: Flags indicate national team as defined under FIFA eligibility rules; some limited exceptions apply. Players may hold more than one non-FIFA nationality.

No.	Pos.	Nation	Player
29	MF	BOL	Jesús Velásquez (at Real Tomayapo until 31 December 2026)

== Coaching staff ==
Position	Staff
Manager	(Spain) Beñat San José
Assistant manager	(Spain) Unai Mendia
Goalkeeper coach	TBA
First coach	(Bolivia) Vladimir Soria
Medical director	(Argentina) Gaston Lloveras
Reserve team manager	(Bolivia) Walter Flores
Youth team manager	TBA

== Notable players ==
See also Category:Club Bolívar players.

== Managers ==
- (Bolivia) Wilfredo Camacho
- (Peru) Moisés Barack
- (Greece) Dan Georgiadis (1962, 1965–68)
- (Bolivia) Ramiro Blacut (1979, 1983, 1988–89)
- (Russia) Vitaly Shevchenko (1992–94)
- (Argentina) José Pastoriza (1994)
- (Spain) Antonio López Habas (1994–95)
- (Bolivia) Ramiro Blacut (1995)
- (Argentina) Jorge Habegger (1 January 1996 – 31 December 1997)
- (Spain) Antonio López Habas (2000–01)
- (Bolivia) Vladimir Soria (2002–05)
- (Argentina) Jorge Habegger (1 January 2005 – 30 June 2005)
- (Bolivia) Carlos Aragonés (2005–06)
- (Bolivia) Víctor Hugo Antelo (2007)
- (Argentina) Jorge Habegger (1 March 2008 – 9 October 2008)
- (Bolivia) Gustavo Quinteros (1 January 2009 – 31 December 2009)
- (Colombia) Santiago Escobar (19 July 2009 – 30 June 2010)
- (Argentina) Néstor Clausen (12 June 2010 – 12 December 2010)
- (Argentina) Guillermo Hoyos (1 January 2011 – 13 May 2012)
- (Spain) Miguel Ángel Portugal (1 July 2012 – 31 December 2013)
- (Spain) Xabier Azkargorta (9 March 2014–15)
- (Bolivia) Eduardo Villegas (2015)
- (Argentina) Rubén Darío Insúa (1 January 2016 – 16 April)
- (Bolivia) Óscar Villegas (April 2016 – 16 May)
- (Spain) Beñat San José (May 2016 – 17 December)
- (Brazil) Vinícius Eutrópio (January 2018 – June 2018)
- (Uruguay) Alfredo Arias (June 2018 – December 2018)
- (Argentina) César Vigevani (December 2018 – December 2019)
- (Argentina) Claudio Vivas (December 2019 – October 2020)
- (Bolivia) Wálter Flores (October 2020 – December 2020)
- (Spain) Natxo González (December 2020 – present)
