= 2004 Copa Sudamericana =

2004 Copa Nissan Sudamericana
2004 Copa Nissan Sudamericana de Clubes 2004 Copa Nissan Sul-americana do Clubes

Tournament details
- Dates: August 10 - December 17
- Teams: 35 (from 10 associations)

Final positions
- Champions: (Argentina) Boca Juniors (1st title)
- Runners-up: (Bolivia) Bolívar

Tournament statistics
- Matches played: 68
- Goals scored: 174 (2.56 per match)
- Top scorer: (Argentina) Horacio Chiorazzo (5)

The 2004 Copa Nissan Sudamericana was the 3rd edition of CONMEBOL's secondary international football tournament. It was won by Argentine club Boca Juniors, who defeated Bolívar of Bolivia to win their first title.

== First stage ==
=== Argentina Preliminary ===
Team 1	Agg.	Team 2	1st leg	2nd leg
Argentina 3A Preliminary
Arsenal (Argentina)	5−4	(Argentina) Banfield	1−1	4−3
Argentina 4A Preliminary
Quilmes (Argentina)	0−2	(Argentina) San Lorenzo	0−2	0−0

=== Brazil Preliminary ===
==== First round ====
Team 1	Agg.	Team 2	1st leg	2nd leg
Brazil 1A Preliminary
Paraná (Brazil)	2−4	(Brazil) Santos	2−1	0−3
Brazil 2A Preliminary
Figueirense (Brazil)	1−1 (2−4p)	(Brazil) Internacional	0−0	1−1
Brazil 3A Preliminary
Goiás (Brazil)	5−3	(Brazil) Atlético Mineiro	4−2	1−1
Brazil 4A Preliminary
Coritiba (Brazil)	3−4	(Brazil) São Caetano	1−2	2−2

==== Second round ====
Team 1	Agg.	Team 2	1st leg	2nd leg
Brazil 5A Preliminary
Santos (Brazil)	2−2 (5−4p)	(Brazil) Flamengo	0−0	2−2
Brazil 6A Preliminary
Internacional (Brazil)	3−2	(Brazil) Grêmio	2−0	1−2
Brazil 7A Preliminary
Goiás (Brazil)	4−5	(Brazil) Cruzeiro	2−2	2−3
Brazil 8A Preliminary
São Caetano (Brazil)	2−2 (1−4p)	(Brazil) São Paulo	1−1	1−1

=== Ecuador/Cienciano/Venezuela Preliminary ===
==== First round ====
Team 1	Agg.	Team 2	1st leg	2nd leg
Venezuela Preliminary
Deportivo Italchacao (Venezuela)	0−2	(Venezuela) Carabobo	0−0	0−2

==== Second round ====
Team 1	Agg.	Team 2	1st leg	2nd leg
Venezuela/Cienciano Preliminary
Cienciano (Peru)	8−2	(Venezuela) Carabobo	2−1	6−1
Ecuador Preliminary
LDU Quito (Ecuador)	2−1	(Ecuador) Aucas	1−0	1−1

=== Chile/Bolivia Preliminary ===
Team 1	Agg.	Team 2	1st leg	2nd leg
Chile Preliminary
Universidad de Concepción (Chile)	3−1	(Chile) Santiago Wanderers	2−1	1−0
Bolivia Preliminary
Aurora (Bolivia)	2−5	(Bolivia) Bolívar	1−2	1−3

=== Colombia/Peru Preliminary ===
Team 1	Agg.	Team 2	1st leg	2nd leg
Colombia Preliminary
Millonarios (Colombia)	1−2	(Colombia) Junior	1−0	0−2
Peru Preliminary
Coronel Bolognesi (Peru)	2−4	(Peru) Alianza Atlético	1−0	1−4

=== Paraguay/Uruguay Preliminary ===
Team 1	Agg.	Team 2	1st leg	2nd leg
Paraguay Preliminary
Cerro Porteño (Paraguay)	3−1	(Paraguay) Libertad	1−1	2−0
Uruguay Preliminary
Danubio (Uruguay)	2−3	(Uruguay) Peñarol	1−2	1−1

== Second stage ==
=== Argentina Zone ===
Team 1	Agg.	Team 2	1st leg	2nd leg
Quarterfinalist 4
San Lorenzo (Argentina)	2−2 (1−4p)	(Argentina) Boca Juniors	1−0	1−2
Quarterfinalist 6
Arsenal (Argentina)	2−1	(Argentina) River Plate	2−1	0−0

=== Brazil Zone ===
Team 1	Agg.	Team 2	1st leg	2nd leg
Quarterfinalist 2
Internacional (Brazil)	4−1	(Brazil) Cruzeiro	3−1	1−0
Quarterfinalist 7
Santos (Brazil)	2−1	(Brazil) São Paulo	1−0	1−1

=== Ecuador/2003 Champion/Venezuela Zone ===
Team 1	Agg.	Team 2	1st leg	2nd leg
Quarterfinalist 8
LDU Quito (Ecuador)	6−2	(Peru) Cienciano	4−0	2−2

=== Chile/Bolivia Zone ===
Team 1	Agg.	Team 2	1st leg	2nd leg
Quarterfinalist 5
Universidad de Concepción (Chile)	2−4	(Bolivia) Bolívar	0−0	2−4

=== Colombia/Peru Zone ===
Team 1	Agg.	Team 2	1st leg	2nd leg
Quarterfinalist 1
Alianza Atlético (Peru)	1−6	(Colombia) Junior	0−2	1−4

=== Paraguay/Uruguay Zone ===
Team 1	Agg.	Team 2	1st leg	2nd leg
Quarterfinalist 3
Peñarol (Uruguay)	3−4	(Paraguay) Cerro Porteño	1−3	2−1

== Bracket ==
Quarterfinals
(Colombia) Junior	0	1	1
(Brazil) Internacional	1	1	2
(Paraguay) Cerro Porteño	1	0	1 (7)
(Argentina) Boca Juniors	1	0	1 (8)
(Bolivia) Bolívar	0	3	3
(Argentina) Arsenal	1	0	1
(Brazil) Santos	2	1	3
(Ecuador) LDU Quito	3	2	5

Semifinals
(Brazil) Internacional	0	2	2
(Argentina) Boca Juniors	0	4	4
(Bolivia) Bolívar	1	2	3
(Ecuador) LDU Quito	1	1	2

Finals
(Argentina) Boca Juniors	0	2	2
(Bolivia) Bolívar	1	0	1

== Quarterfinals ==
Team 1	Agg.	Team 2	1st leg	2nd leg
Internacional (Brazil)	2−1	(Colombia) Junior	1−0	1−1
Boca Juniors (Argentina)	1−1 (8−7p)	(Paraguay) Cerro Porteño	1−1	0−0
Arsenal (Argentina)	1−3	(Bolivia) Bolívar	1−0	0−3
LDU Quito (Ecuador)	5−3	(Brazil) Santos	3−2	2−1

== Semifinals ==
Team 1	Agg.	Team 2	1st leg	2nd leg
Boca Juniors (Argentina)	4−2	(Brazil) Internacional	4−2	0−0
LDU Quito (Ecuador)	2−3	(Bolivia) Bolívar	1−1	1−2

== Finals ==
December 8, 2004
20.15 (UTC-4)

Bolívar (Bolivia)	1–0	(Argentina) Boca Juniors
Chiorazzo 75'	Report

Estadio Hernando Siles, La Paz
Referee: Carlos Eugênio Simon (Brazil)

December 17, 2004
21:15 (UTC-3)

Boca Juniors (Argentina)	2–0	(Bolivia) Bolívar
Palermo 14'; Tevez 28'	Report

La Bombonera, Buenos Aires
Referee: Carlos Chandía (Chile)
