= Horacio Chiorazzo =

Argentine footballer

Personal information
- Full name: José Horacio Chiorazzo
- Date of birth: 9 June 1976 (age 50)
- Place of birth: Buenos Aires, Argentina
- Height: 1.87 m (6 ft 2 in)
- Position: Striker

Senior career*
Years	Team	Apps	(Gls)
1996–1997	Lanús	4	(1)
1998–2000	Real Santa Cruz	73	(54)
2000–2004	Bolívar	90	(50)
2005	Aucas	17	(4)
2006	Rangers de Talca	8	(3)
2006–2007	Wilstermann	31	(13)
2007	Deportivo Pasto	10	(2)
2008	Sarmiento	15	(2)
2009	Real Potosí	11	(1)
2009–2010	Deportivo Español	3	(0)
- * Club domestic league appearances and goals as of October 22, 2010

José Horacio Chiorazzo (born 9 June 1976 in Buenos Aires) is a former Argentine footballer who played as a striker.

Chiorazzo began his career at Club Atlético Lanús in 1996. He later went abroad to play for Real Santa Cruz, Jorge Wilstermann, Bolívar and Real Potosí in the Bolivian league, Aucas in Ecuador, Rangers de Talca in Chile and Colombian side Deportivo Pasto.

During 2004 while playing for Bolívar, Chiorazzo experienced his best year of his football career. The team had a tremendous success in both, domestic and international competitions. With the help of his goals, Bolívar won the Apertura tournament and also reached the Copa Nissan Sudamericana final stage that year. Although Chiorazzo finished as the topscorer in that tournament, the team came short and Boca Juniors claimed the title.

== Honours ==
=== Individual ===
Bolívar

- Copa Nissan Sudamericana top scorer: 2004 (5 goals)
