= Wilfredo Moreno =

Venezuelan footballer (born 1976)

Personal information
- Date of birth: 19 April 1976 (age 50)
- Place of birth: Ciudad Guayana, Venezuela

International career
Years	Team	Apps	(Gls)
2002–2004	Venezuela	11	(1)

Wilfredo Moreno (born 19 April 1976) is a Venezuelan footballer. He played in eleven matches for the Venezuela national football team from 2002 to 2004. He was also part of Venezuela's squad for the 2004 Copa América tournament.
