= 2001–02 in Venezuelan football =

The following article presents a summary of the 2001–02 football season in Venezuela.

== Venezuela national team ==
Date	Venue	Opponents	Score	Comp	Venezuela scorers	Fixture
2001-08-14	Estadio José Pachencho Romero; Maracaibo, Venezuela	Uruguay	2 - 0	WCQ02	Morán 52'; Rondón 90'	188
2001-09-04	Estadio Nacional; Santiago, Chile	Chile	0 - 2	WCQ02	Páez 56'; Arango 62'	189
2001-10-06	Estadio Pueblo Nuevo; San Cristóbal, Venezuela	Peru	3 - 0	WCQ02	Alvarado 53' 67'; Morán 78'	190
2001-11-08	Estadio Pueblo Nuevo; San Cristóbal, Venezuela	Paraguay	3 - 1	WCQ02	Morán 2'; Noriega 22'; Gonzalez 40'	191
2001-11-14	Estadio Castelão; São Luís, Brazil	Brazil	3 - 0	WCQ02		192
2001-01-13	Estadio Pueblo Nuevo; San Cristóbal, Venezuela	Cameroon	1 - 1	F	Vallenilla 22'	Non-official
2002-03-01	Stade Mohamed V Casablanca, Morocco	Iran	1 - 0	F		193
2002-03-03	Stade Mohamed V Casablanca, Morocco	Morocco	2 - 0	F		Non-official
2002-05-07	Estadio Olímpico; Caracas, Venezuela	Colombia	0 - 0	F		194
