= Julio Pérez (footballer, born 1991) =

Bolivian footballer (born 1991)

Personal information
- Full name: Julio César Pérez Peredo
- Date of birth: 24 October 1991 (age 35)
- Place of birth: Santa Cruz de la Sierra, Bolivia
- Height: 1.83 m (6 ft 0 in)
- Position: Defender

Team information
- Current team: Oriente Petrolero
- Number: 21

Senior career*
Years	Team	Apps	(Gls)
2012–2013	Oriente Petrolero	5	(0)
2013	Guabirá	7	(0)
2014–2015	Sport Boys	22	(2)
2015–2018	The Strongest	26	(2)
2018	Sport Boys	30	(1)
2019–	Oriente Petrolero	29	(2)
- * Club domestic league appearances and goals as of 14:17, 23 September 2019 (UTC)

Julio César Pérez Peredo (born 24 October 1991) is a Bolivian professional footballer who plays as a defender for Bolivian Primera División club Oriente Petrolero.

== Career statistics ==
=== Club ===
As of 19 May 2017

Club	Season	League		Cup		Continental		Other		Total	
Club	Season	Apps	Goals	Apps	Goals	Apps	Goals	Apps	Goals	Apps	Goals
Oriente Petrolero	2011–12	1	0	—						1	0
Oriente Petrolero	2012–13	4	0	—						4	0
Oriente Petrolero	Total	5	0	0	0	0	0	0	0	5	0
Guabirá	2013–14	7	0	—						7	0
Sport Boys	2014–15	22	2	—						22	2
The Strongest	2015–16	17	1	—		0	0	—		17	1
The Strongest	2016–17	6	1	—		4	0	—		10	1
The Strongest	Total	23	2	0	0	4	0	0	0	27	2
Total		57	4	0	0	4	0	0	0	61	4
