= 2014–15 Liga de Fútbol Profesional Boliviano =

Liga de Fútbol Profesional Boliviano
- Season: 2014–15
- Champions: Apertura: Bolívar (23rd title); Clausura:Bolívar (24th title)
- Relegated: Universitario de Pando
- 2016 Copa Libertadores: Bolívar
- Matches: 264
- Goals: 721 (2.73 per match)
- Top goalscorer: Juanmi Callejón (23)
- Biggest home win: Universitario 9-1 Universitario (P) (19 May 2015)
- Biggest away win: Universitario Cobija 1-6 Oriente Petrolero (17 January 2015)
- Highest scoring: Universitario 9-1 Universitario (P) (19 May 2015)
- Longest winning run: Bolívar (7)
- Longest unbeaten run: Bolívar (14)
- Longest winless run: Nacional Potosí; Sport Boys; Universitario (P) (11)
- Longest losing run: Sport Boys; Universitario (P) (7)

The 2014–15 Liga de Fútbol Profesional Boliviano season is the 38th season of LFPB.

== Teams ==
The number of teams for 2014–15 remains the same. Aurora and Guabirá were relegated to the Liga Nacional B. They were replaced by the 2013–14 Liga Nacional B champion Universitario (P) and Petrolero.

Locations of the 2014–15 LFPB teams

Team	Home city	Home stadium
Blooming	Santa Cruz	Ramón Tahuichi Aguilera
Bolívar	La Paz	Hernando Siles
Jorge Wilstermann	Cochabamba	Estadio Félix Capriles
Nacional Potosí	Potosí	Víctor Agustín Ugarte
Oriente Petrolero	Santa Cruz	Ramón Tahuichi Aguilera
Petrolero	Yacuiba	Defensores de Villamontes
Real Potosí	Potosí	Víctor Agustín Ugarte
San José	Oruro	Jesús Bermúdez
Sport Boys	Warnes	Samuel Vaca
The Strongest	La Paz	Hernando Siles
Universitario de Sucre	Sucre	Olímpico Patria
Universitario de Pando	Cobija	Universidad Amazónica de Pando

== Torneo Apertura ==
=== Standings ===
Pos	Team	Pld	W	D	L	GF	GA	GD	Pts	Qualification
1	Bolívar	22	14	4	4	52	23	+29	46	2016 Copa Libertadores second stage
2	Oriente Petrolero	22	13	3	6	33	18	+15	42	
3	The Strongest	22	11	4	7	39	26	+13	37	
4	Jorge Wilstermann	22	9	7	6	30	25	+5	34	
5	San José	22	11	1	10	34	33	+1	34	
6	Blooming	22	8	7	7	29	30	−1	31	
7	Real Potosí	22	8	6	8	23	28	−5	30	
8	Universitario de Sucre	22	9	2	11	26	35	−9	29	
9	Nacional Potosí	22	7	5	10	29	32	−3	26	
10	Petrolero	22	7	5	10	27	41	−14	26	
11	Sport Boys	22	3	11	8	21	28	−7	20	
12	Universitario de Pando	22	3	3	16	18	42	−24	12	

Updated to match(es) played on October 6, 2014. Source: Standings
Rules for classification: 1) points; 2) goal difference; 3) number of goals scored.

=== Results ===
Home \ Away	BLO	BOL	WIL	NAC	OPE	PET	RPO	SJO	SBW	STR	UNI	UP
Blooming		0–3	1–1	2–1	3–2	1–0	3–1	3–1	2–2	0–1	1–2	3–0
Bolívar	4–3		1–0	3–3	4–0	2–0	6–1	6–1	5–1	1–1	2–1	4–0
Jorge Wilstermann	1–1	0–0		5–2	2–0	2–2	1–0	2–1	1–2	1–1	2–1	3–0
Nacional Potosí	0–0	0–2	1–2		1–0	3–1	1–0	2–0	0–0	1–3	3–0	3–2
Oriente Petrolero	2–0	1–0	2–0	2–0		4–0	2–1	1–0	3–0	2–0	4–0	2–0
Petrolero	0–1	1–1	1–1	1–5	1–1		2–0	3–0	0–0	2–1	2–1	2–1
Real Potosí	1–1	1–0	1–0	2–2	0–0	2–3		3–0	1–0	1–0	2–0	1–0
San José	2–0	1–0	2–0	1–0	3–0	4–1	6–2		2–0	3–3	3–1	2–1
Sport Boys	1–1	5–0	1–1	1–1	1–1	1–2	1–1	2–0		1–1	1–1	1–3
The Strongest	4–0	1–1	4–1	2–0	2–1	4–0	0–2	1–0	1–0		0–1	3–1
Universitario de Sucre	0–1	1–2	0–2	2–1	0–2	4–3	0–0	1–0	1–0	3–2		3–0
Universitario de Pando	2–2	0–2	1–2	1–0	0–1	2–0	0–0	1–2	0–0	1–3	2–3	

Source: Soccerway.com
Legend: Blue = home team win; Yellow = draw; Red = away team win.

=== Top goalscorers ===
Rank	Name	Club	Goals
1	(Spain) Juanmi Callejón	Bolívar	15
2	(Ecuador) Carlos Tenorio	Bolívar	12
3	(Argentina) Sergio Almirón	Blooming	9
4	(Argentina) Mauro Bustamante	San José	8
4	(Brazil) Anderson Da Silva	N Potosí	8
4	(Bolivia) Pablo Daniel Escobar	Strongest	8
4	(Paraguay) Carlos Neumann	Jorge Wilstermann	8
4	(Bolivia) Rodrigo Ramallo	The Strongest	8
4	(Argentina) Pablo Vázquez	Real Potosí	8
10	(Bolivia) Oscar Díaz	Wilstermann	7
10	(Colombia) Jeison Quiñónes	Yacuiba	7
10	(Bolivia) Pablo Salinas	Blooming	7

Source: Soccerway.com

== Torneo Clausura ==
=== Standings ===
Pos	Team	Pld	W	D	L	GF	GA	GD	Pts	Qualification
1	Bolívar (C)	22	14	4	4	44	22	+22	46	2016 Copa Libertadores second stage
2	The Strongest	22	12	6	4	48	28	+20	42	
3	Jorge Wilstermann	22	10	9	3	23	15	+8	39	
4	Blooming	22	9	8	5	32	22	+10	35	
5	Oriente Petrolero	22	9	7	6	39	25	+14	34	
6	Real Potosí	22	10	3	9	30	23	+7	33	
7	San José	22	7	6	9	33	29	+4	27	
8	Petrolero	22	5	11	6	21	25	−4	26	
9	Universitario de Sucre	22	7	3	12	27	36	−9	24	
10	Nacional Potosí	22	5	8	9	24	29	−5	23	
11	Sport Boys	22	5	3	14	24	42	−18	18	
12	Universitario de Pando (R)	22	2	6	14	15	64	−49	12	

Updated to match(es) played on 19 March 2015. Source: Standings
Rules for classification: 1) points; 2) goal difference; 3) number of goals scored.
(C) Champions; (R) Relegated

=== Results ===
Home \ Away	BLO	BOL	CUN	NAC	OPE	PET	RPO	SJO	SBW	STR	UNC	WIL
Blooming		1–0	2–0	2–0	2–1	3–0	3–0	2–2	2–0	2–1	1–1	0–0
Bolívar	4–3		2–0	3–1	2–1	4–1	2–1	1–0	5–0	1–1	4–0	1–0
Universitario de Sucre	1–3	2–2		2–1	1–2	1–2	1–0	0–0	2–0	0–1	9–1	2–1
Nacional Potosí	1–0	1–2	0–1		1–0	0–0	2–2	2–3	1–1	4–3	3–0	0–1
Oriente Petrolero	1–0	3–0	2–2	2–2		0–0	1–1	4–0	3–1	0–0	3–0	2–0
Petrolero	0–0	1–1	3–0	0–0	1–1		0–1	0–0	2–1	3–2	2–2	1–2
Real Potosí	3–0	0–2	0–2	0–1	2–0	1–0		2–0	2–0	1–2	6–0	1–1
San José	2–2	0–2	6–0	1–0	4–1	1–1	0–2		2–1	1–2	6–0	1–1
Sport Boys	1–1	3–2	2–1	0–0	0–2	1–2	1–2	3–2		1–2	3–0	0–1
The Strongest	1–1	1–0	3–0	2–2	4–3	4–2	3–0	1–0	6–2		5–0	2–2
Universitario de Pando	2–2	1–2	1–0	2–0	1–6	0–0	0–3	0–2	1–3	2–2		1–1
Jorge Wilstermann	1–0	1–1	1–0	2–2	1–1	0–0	2–0	2–0	1–0	1–0	1–0	

Updated to match(es) played on 19 May 2015. Source: Soccerway.com
Legend: Blue = home team win; Yellow = draw; Red = away team win.

=== Top goalscorers ===
Through games played on 19 May 2015

Rank	Name	Club	Goals
1	(Argentina) Martín Palavicini	Universitario de Sucre	13
2	(France) Hugo Bargas	Blooming	11
3	(Bolivia) Gilbert Álvarez	Real Potosí	9
3	(Bolivia) Yasmani Duk	O. Petrolero	9
5	(Spain) Juanmi Callejón	Bolívar	8
6	(Bolivia) Pablo Daniel Escobar	The Strongest	7
7	(Argentina) Nicolás Bubas	Nacional Potosí	6
7	(Argentina) Mauro Bustamante	San José	6
7	(Paraguay) Nelson David Cabrera	Bolívar	6
7	(Bolivia) José Alfredo Castillo	Sport Boys	6
7	(Bolivia) Alejandro Chumacero	Strongest	6
7	(Bolivia) Ronald Puma	San José	6
7	(Bolivia) Carlos Saucedo	Petrolero	6

Source: Soccerway.com

== Relegation ==
Pos	Team	2013–14 Pts	2014–15 Pts	Total Pts	Total Pld	Avg	Relegation
1	Bolívar	76	92	168	88	1.9091	
2	The Strongest	85	79	164	88	1.8636	
3	San José	80	61	141	88	1.6023	
4	Jorge Wilstermann	61	73	134	88	1.5114	
5	Oriente Petrolero	58	76	134	88	1.5227	
6	Real Potosí	67	63	130	88	1.4773	
7	Universitario de Sucre	71	53	124	88	1.4091	
8	Blooming	43	66	109	88	1.2386	
9	Petrolero	—	52	52	44	1.1818	
10	Nacional Potosí	52	49	101	88	1.1477	
11	Sport Boys	50	38	88	88	1	Relegation Playoff Match
12	Universitario de Pando	—	24	24	44	0.5455	Relegation to the Liga Nacional B

=== Relegation/promotion playoff ===
Team #1	Points	Team #2	1st leg	2nd leg	Playoff	Aggregate
Sport Boys	6:3	Atlético Bermejo	1–3	4–1	2–0	7–4

Sport Boys remains at the season 2015–16 LFPB.
