= Kevin Benítez =

Colombian footballer (born 1994)

Personal information
- Full name: Kevin Benítez León
- Date of birth: 30 September 1994 (age 32)
- Place of birth: Cali, Colombia
- Height: 1.81 m (5 ft 11 in)
- Position: Forward

Youth career
- Boca Juniors de Cali

Senior career*
Years	Team	Apps	(Gls)
2011–2012	Deportes Quindío	18	(4)
2012–201?	Universitario Popayán	13	(1)
2014	Boyacá Chicó	1	(0)
2015	Petrolero	12	(2)
2016–2017	Universitario de Sucre	0	(0)
2017	Independiente de Cauquenes	7	(0)
2018	Royal Obrero		
2018–2020	Municipal San Ramón		
- * Club domestic league appearances and goals as of 21 March 2018

Kevin Benítez León (born September 30, 1994) is a Colombian footballer who plays as a forward for Municipal San Ramón in Costa Rica.

He previously played domestically for Deportes Quindío and Boyacá Chicó of the Primera A and for Primera B club Universitario Popayán, as well as for Bolivian Primera División club Petrolero and Independiente de Cauquenes of the Segunda División de Chile (Chilean third tier). He was on the books of another Bolivian Primera club, Universitario de Sucre, without playing for them in league competition. Internationally, he represented his country from under-15 to under-20 level.

== Life and career ==
Benítez was born in Cali, Colombia. He played youth football under the auspices of the Liga vallecaucana and in the Boca Juniors de Cali academy. He represented his country at levels from under-15 to under-20. At the 2009 South American Under-15 Championship, he scored three goals in the group stage, and repeated the feat for the under-15s at the 2009 Torneo Internacional de las Américas, a nominally under-17 tournament. He was a member of the under-17 squad that won the gold medal at the 2010 South American Games, and scored in the final as his team beat Club Atlas U17 5–2 to win the 2010 Torneo de las Américas. He also participated in training camps with Colombia's under-20 squad.

His first professional club was Deportes Quindío. He made his debut on 27 March 2011, aged 16, against Boyacá Chicó in the Primera A. Entering the match after 68 minutes with his team 2–0 down, he scored his first senior goal 12 minutes later with a powerful shot from inside the penalty area, the match ended 2–1. His second appearance, on 11 April, was in a 5–0 defeat against Millonarios when manager Fernando Castro fielded a youth team in protest over non-payment of the first team's wages. He played five more matches in the 2011 Apertura and scored another three goals, followed by five appearances without scoring in the Torneo Finalización and six, again without scoring, in the 2012 Apertura.

Benítez left Quindío for Primera B club Universitario Popayán ahead of the 2012 Torneo Finalización. His first appearance was on the opening day of the campaign, as a late substitute in a 1–1 draw away to Fortaleza; the match was later awarded as a 3–0 win to the hosts because Universitario had fielded a suspended player. He played eight times in the 2012 season and five in the next, scoring once, in a 3–2 defeat away to Cortuluá. On his last Primera B appearance, on 31 March against the same opponents, he missed what El Pueblo called the best chance of the match, which would have given his team a 2–1 win.

Reportedly a transfer target for América de Cali in December 2013, the 19-year-old Benítez returned to the Primera A the following July with Boyacá Chicó, the club against which he made his debut. He played in nine of Chicó's twelve matches in the 2014 Copa Colombia, but made only one league appearance at the higher level, starting in a goalless draw with Deportivo Pasto on 20 September. He was released at the end of the season.

His next port of call was Petrolero, newly promoted to the Bolivian Primera División. He made 12 appearances in the 2015 Clausura and scored twice: in a 2–1 away win against Universitario de Sucre, and with a penalty in stoppage time to give his team a 3–2 victory against The Strongest. He left the club at the end of the tournament, and moved on to Universitario de Sucre – against which he had scored for Petrolero – but played no Primera División football for them.

He spent the latter part of 2017 with Independiente de Cauquenes of the Segunda División de Chile, making his debut as a half-time substitute in a goalless draw with Vallenar. He went on to make seven appearances, mostly as a substitute, without scoring, and an analysis of the foreign contribution to Chilean third-tier football did not rate him highly. He returned to Bolivia in 2018 where he signed for the Tarija-based Royal Obrero of the Torneo Nacional Interprovincial (third tier). Later in 2018, he joined Costa Rican club Municipal San Ramón.
