= 2013–14 Liga de Fútbol Profesional Boliviano =

Liga de Fútbol Profesional Boliviano
- Season: 2013–14
- Champions: Apertura: The Strongest (11th title); Clausura: Universitario (2nd title)
- 2014 Copa Libertadores: The Strongest
- 2014 Copa Sudamericana: Jorge Wilstermann; Nacional Potosí; Universitario
- 2015 Copa Libertadores: Universitario; San José; The Strongest
- 2015 Copa Sudamericana: Real Potosí; Bolívar; Aurora; Oriente Petrolero

The 2013–14 Liga de Fútbol Profesional Boliviano season was the 37th season of LFPB.

== Teams ==
The number of teams for 2012 remains the same. Petrolero and La Paz were relegated to the Liga Nacional B. They were replaced by the 2012–13 Liga Nacional B champion Guabirá and Sport Boys.

Locations of the 2013 LFPB teams

Team	Home city	Home stadium
Aurora	Cochabamba	Félix Capriles
Blooming	Santa Cruz	Ramón Tahuichi Aguilera
Bolívar	La Paz	Hernando Siles
Guabirá	Montero	Gilberto Parada
Jorge Wilstermann	Cochabamba	Estadio Félix Capriles
Nacional Potosí	Potosí	Víctor Agustín Ugarte
Oriente Petrolero	Santa Cruz	Ramón Tahuichi Aguilera
Real Potosí	Potosí	Víctor Agustín Ugarte
San José	Oruro	Jesús Bermúdez
Sport Boys	Warnes	Samuel Vaca
The Strongest	La Paz	Hernando Siles
Universitario de Sucre	Sucre	Olímpico Patria

== Torneo Apertura ==
=== Standings ===
Pos	Team	Pld	W	D	L	GF	GA	GD	Pts	Qualification
1	The Strongest	22	14	3	5	47	27	+20	45	2014 Copa Libertadores Second Stage
2	Bolívar	22	13	4	5	50	21	+29	43	Already qualified for 2014 Copa Libertadores (Note: Bolívar and San José are already qualified for the 2014 Copa Libertadores and 2014 Copa Sudamericana respectively through the 2013 Clausura.)
3	San José	22	11	6	5	44	32	+12	39	Already qualified for 2014 Copa Sudamericana
4	Jorge Wilstermann	22	9	7	6	43	38	+5	34	2014 Copa Sudamericana First Stage
5	Nacional Potosí	22	9	5	8	20	25	−5	32	2014 Copa Sudamericana First Stage
6	Universitario de Sucre	22	8	5	9	36	34	+2	29	2014 Copa Sudamericana First Stage
7	Real Potosí	22	8	4	10	33	33	0	28	
8	Oriente Petrolero	22	7	6	9	25	40	−15	27	
9	Blooming	22	7	4	11	22	37	−15	25	
10	Sport Boys	22	5	8	9	21	29	−8	23	
11	Guabirá	22	6	5	11	27	37	−10	23	
12	Aurora	22	3	7	12	32	47	−15	16	

Updated to match(es) played on December 22, 2013. Source: Standings
Rules for classification: 1) points; 2) goal difference; 3) number of goals scored.

=== Results ===
Home \ Away	AUR	BLO	BOL	GUA	WIL	NAC	OPE	RPO	SJO	SBW	STR	UNI
Aurora		0–1	0–0	3–2	1–1	2–0	1–2	1–2	3–3	3–3	0–0	4–1
Blooming	3–2		1–3	1–0	3–3	2–0	1–3	2–1	0–0	0–2	1–1	2–1
Bolívar	4–0	2–1		6–1	2–1	2–1	6–0	1–1	2–2	0–0	2–0	4–2
Guabirá	0–0	3–1	1–3		1–1	1–0	2–0	1–2	3–0	1–0	3–5	1–2
Jorge Wilstermann	4–2	0–1	3–1	1–1		1–1	6–1	2–1	1–1	2–1	4–3	4–2
Nacional Potosí	2–0	2–0	1–0	1–0	2–1		1–1	0–6	0–1	2–1	2–0	1–0
Oriente Petrolero	3–1	1–0	1–0	2–2	1–2	0–0		3–0	1–1	1–1	0–2	3–1
Real Potosí	4–1	3–0	0–5	3–0	4–2	0–3	0–0		1–2	2–1	0–0	0–1
San José	5–3	2–1	0–3	4–1	4–0	4–0	3–2	4–3		3–0	0–1	2–1
Sport Boys	1–0	0–0	1–0	0–2	1–1	0–0	4–0	0–0	2–1		1–2	0–0
The Strongest	3–2	5–0	2–3	1–0	3–1	2–0	3–0	3–0	3–1	4–2		2–1
Universitario de Sucre	3–3	2–0	2–1	1–1	1–2	1–1	3–0	1–0	1–1	5–0	4–2	

Source: Soccerway.com
Legend: Blue = home team win; Yellow = draw; Red = away team win.

Liga de Fútbol Profesional Boliviano
2013 Torneo Apertura champion

11th title

== Torneo Clausura ==
=== Standings ===
Pos	Team	Pld	W	D	L	GF	GA	GD	Pts	Qualification
1	Universitario de Sucre (C)	22	12	6	4	38	28	+10	42	2015 Copa Libertadores Second Stage
2	San José	22	13	2	7	51	30	+21	41	2015 Copa Libertadores Second Stage
3	The Strongest	22	12	4	6	40	32	+8	40	2015 Copa Libertadores First Stage
4	Real Potosí	22	11	6	5	38	24	+14	39	2015 Copa Sudamericana First Stage
5	Bolívar	22	10	3	9	38	32	+6	33	2015 Copa Sudamericana First Stage
6	Aurora	22	9	5	8	33	29	+4	32	2015 Copa Sudamericana First Stage
7	Oriente Petrolero	22	9	4	9	30	32	−2	31	2015 Copa Sudamericana First Stage
8	Jorge Wilstermann	22	7	6	9	25	32	−7	27	
9	Sport Boys	22	7	6	9	25	32	−7	27	
10	Guabirá	22	6	4	12	25	41	−16	22	
11	Nacional Potosí	22	6	2	14	26	39	−13	20	
12	Blooming	22	6	0	16	32	50	−18	18	

Updated to match(es) played on 11 May 2014. Source: Standings
Rules for classification: 1) points; 2) goal difference; 3) number of goals scored.
(C) Champions

=== Results ===
Home \ Away	AUR	BLO	BOL	GUA	WIL	NAC	OPE	RPO	SJO	SBW	STR	UNI
Aurora		3–2	3–1	4–0	2–0	1–0	0–0	2–1	2–1	3–0	1–2	0–0
Blooming	1–2		0–1	1–0	2–0	3–0	2–3	2–0	2–1	1–3	1–2	5–0
Bolívar	3–0	6–0		2–0	2–1	2–1	2–0	1–3	0–1	5–0	0–1	4–3
Guabirá	1–1	3–0	2–1		1–1	2–0	2–3	0–1	3–4	2–0	3–2	2–0
Jorge Wilstermann	2–1	4–2	1–2	2–0		3–1	2–2	0–2	0–0	1–0	0–0	1–1
Nacional Potosí	3–2	3–0	1–1	1–0	2–3		3–1	2–2	1–4	2–3	3–1	0–1
Oriente Petrolero	1–0	4–3	4–0	2–2	0–0	1–0		1–3	1–2	1–0	2–0	0–1
Real Potosí	3–3	2–0	2–0	1–1	4–2	2–0	3–0		1–2	1–0	1–0	2–2
San José	2–1	3–1	3–3	7–0	0–1	1–2	2–0	1–1		4–0	7–2	4–3
Sport Boys	1–1	4–1	0–0	2–0	2–0	3–1	1–3	2–2	1–0		0–1	1–1
The Strongest	4–1	2–1	3–3	5–1	3–1	1–0	2–0	2–1	3–1	1–1		2–2
Universitario de Sucre	1–0	4–2	3–1	1–0	3–0	2–0	2–1	1–0	4–1	1–1	2–1	

Source: Soccerway.com
Legend: Blue = home team win; Yellow = draw; Red = away team win.

Liga de Fútbol Profesional Boliviano
2014 Torneo Clausura champion

2nd title

== Relegation ==
Pos	Team	2012–13 Pts	2013–14 Pts	Total Pts	Total Pld	Avg	Relegation
1	The Strongest	79	85	164	88	1.8636	
2	Bolívar	87	76	163	88	1.8523	
3	San José	82	80	162	88	1.8409	
4	Oriente Petrolero	80	58	138	88	1.5682	
5	Universitario de Sucre	60	71	131	88	1.4886	
6	Real Potosí	63	67	130	88	1.4773	
7	Jorge Wilstermann	58	61	119	88	1.3523	
8	Blooming	58	43	101	88	1.1477	
9	Sport Boys	—	50	50	44	1.1364	
10	Nacional Potosí	47	52	99	88	1.125	
11	Aurora	44	48	92	88	1.0455	Relegation Playoff Match
12	Guabirá	—	45	45	44	1.0227	Relegation to the Liga Nacional B

=== Relegation/promotion playoff ===
Team #1	Points	Team #2	1st leg	2nd leg	Playoff
Aurora	3:3	Petrolero	1–1	1–1	1 (3)– 1 (4)

Petrolero has won on penalties shoot-out and Aurora was relegated to the Liga Nacional B.
