= Torneo Nacional Interprovincial =

- Founded: 2011
- Folded: 2019
- Number of clubs: 10
- Level on pyramid: 3
- Promotion to: Liga Nacional B
- Last champions: JV Mariscal (2011)
- Most championships: JV Mariscal (1 title)

Torneo Nacional Interprovincial is the third tier of the Bolivian Football pyramid. In Torneo Nacional Interprovincial 2012 will comprise the champions of the nine provincial championship and the host team from Tarija. The winners will be promoted to the 2012–13 Liga Nacional B, while the second place will compete in Copa Bolivia.

== List of Champions ==
Ed.	Season	Champion	Runner-up
1	2011	JV Mariscal	Juventud Unida
2	2012	Municipalidad de Yacuíba	San José (Chiquitos)
3	2013	Municipalidad de Porvenir	San Joaquín
4	2014	Quebracho	San Juan
5	2015	Atlético San Borja	23 de Marzo
6	2016	Quebracho	Universitario de Vinto
7	2017	Quebracho	Universitario de Vinto
8	2018	Juventud Unida; Universitario de Vinto	—
9	2019	San Joaquín; Fortaleza de Yacuiba	—
