= 2012 Copa Bolivia =

The 2012 season of the Copa Bolívia is the first edition of the third tier of the Bolivian Football pyramid. In this edition will comprise the runners-up of the nine regional championship, the runners-up of Torneo Nacional Interprovincial 2012 and two invited teams. The host cities are Tarija and Warnes. The best three teams of the competition will be promoted to the 2012–13 Liga Nacional B.

== Teams ==
Team	Classification
ABB	La Paz Runners-up
Ciclón	Tarija Runners-up
Colcapirhua	Cochabamba Runners-up
Emilio Alave	Potosi Runners-up
Enrique Happ	Invited (3rd place of Cochabamba)
Fancesa	Chuquisaca Runners-up
Huanuni	Oruro Runners-up
La Palmera	Beni Runners-up
San José (Pailón)	Torneo Nacional Interprovincial Runners-up
Sport Boys	Santa Cruz Runners-up
Stormers	Invited (3rd place of Chuquisaca)
Vaca Díez	Pando Runners-up

== Group stage ==
=== Group A ===
Pos	Team	Pld	W	D	L	GF	GA	GD	Pts	Qualification
1	Ciclón	10	5	5	0	16	0	+16	20	Advanced to the Semifinal
2	Enrique Happ	5	3	1	1	12	7	+5	10	Advanced to the Semifinal
3	Fancesa	5	3	0	2	10	8	+2	9	
4	San José (Pailó)	5	1	1	3	9	16	−7	4	
5	Emilio Alave	5	1	1	3	8	15	−7	4	
6	ABB	5	0	1	4	5	4	+1	1	

=== Group B ===
Pos	Team	Pld	W	D	L	GF	GA	GD	Pts	Qualification
1	Sport Boys	5	4	1	0	10	4	+6	13	Advanced to the Semifinal
2	La Palmera	5	4	0	1	10	4	+6	12	Advanced to the Semifinal
3	Huanuni	5	2	2	1	12	4	+8	8	
4	Colcapirhua	5	2	0	3	6	5	+1	6	
5	Universitario (Pando)	5	1	1	3	5	7	−2	4	
6	Stormer's	5	0	0	5	1	20	−19	0	

== Semifinals ==
Ciclón	5–1	La Palmera

Sport Boys	0–4	Enrique Happ

== Third Place ==
La Palmera	1–2	Sport Boys

== Final ==
Ciclón	1–1 (4-5 p)	Enrique Happ
