= Carlos Tenorio =

Ecuadorian footballer (born 1979)

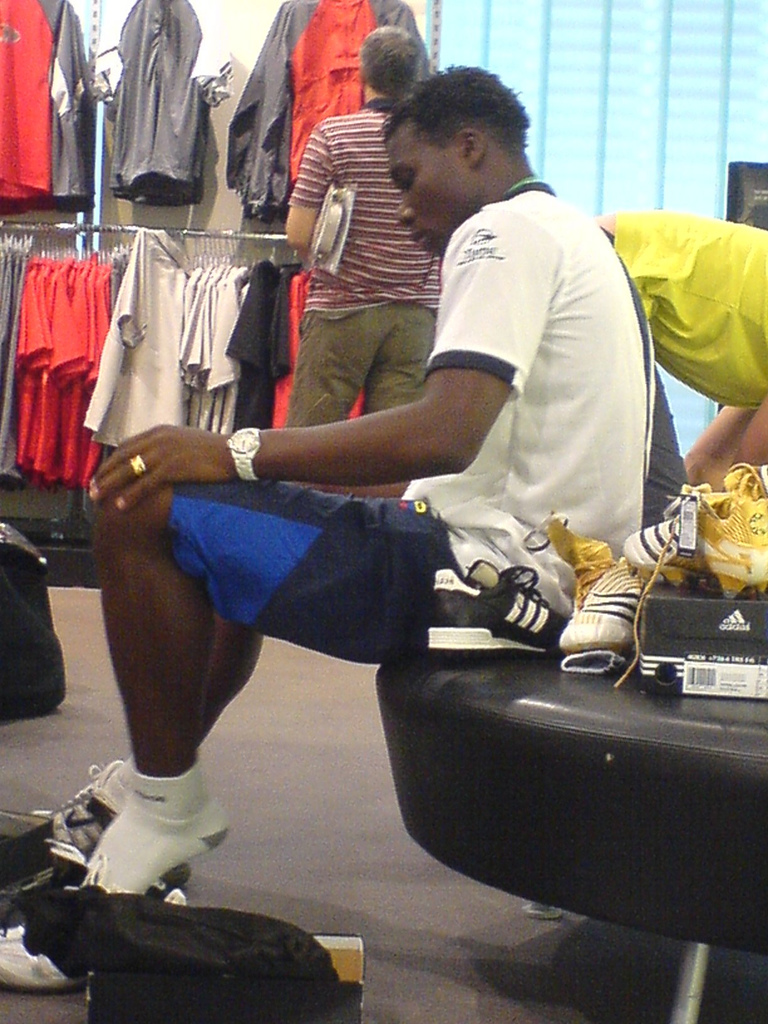
- Image of Carlos Tenorio

Personal information
- Full name: Carlos Vicente Tenorio Medina
- Date of birth: 14 May 1979 (age 47)
- Place of birth: Esmeraldas, Ecuador
- Height: 1.83 m (6 ft 0 in)
- Position: Forward

Senior career*
Years	Team	Apps	(Gls)
2001–2003	LDU Quito	61	(31)
2003	→ Al-Nassr (loan)	16	(15)
2003–2009	Al Sadd	88	(63)
2009–2011	Al-Nasr	25	(23)
2012–2013	Vasco da Gama	33	(6)
2014	El Nacional	12	(5)
2014–2015	Bolívar	55	(23)
2016	LDU Quito	22	(3)
2017	Sport Boys	2	(0)
2018	Atlético Saquisilí	2	(1)
Total		316	(160)

International career
2001–2011	Ecuador	52	(12 (Note: Although statistics on National-Football-Teams shows 50 matches, RSSSF appearances for Ecuador shows 52))
- * Club domestic league appearances and goals as of 20 May 2022

Carlos Vicente Tenorio Medina (born 14 May 1979) is an Ecuadorian former footballer who played as a striker. He last played for Ecuadorian club Atlético Saquisilí. From 2001 to 2009, he played for the Ecuador national team.

== Club career ==
Tenorio began his club career with LDU Quito in the Ecuadorian Serie B, helping them regain promotion to Serie A in the 2001 season by topping the division with Tenorio scoring 11 league goals. In 2003, Tenorio won the Serie A title with LDU Quito.Blackburn Rovers and Wolverhampton Wanderers were interested in buying Tenorio, but LDU refused, believing Tenorio was inexperienced. Afterwards he joined Saudi Arabian club Al Nassr for one season, scoring 15 goals in 16 appearances.

From 2003 to 2009, Tenorio played in Qatar for Al Sadd, winning three Qatar Stars League titles, before moving to Al-Nasr in the United Arab Emirates. Before the 2007 Copa América, Tenorio expressed interest in playing in the Premier League. In 2012, Tenorio returned to South America, playing for various clubs including Vasco da Gama who were relegated from the Brazilian Série A in 2013, and Bolívar who topped the Bolivian Primera División in 2014–15. He returned to Quito for one season in 2016.

== International career ==
Tenorio has represented his nation at the FIFA World Cup in 2002 and 2006. In the 2006 World Cup, he scored against Poland and Costa Rica as Ecuador progressed to the second round.

== Career statistics ==
Club	Season	League			State league+Super Cup		League Cup		National Cup		Continental		Total	
Club	Season	Division	Apps	Goals	Apps	Goals	Apps	Goals	Apps	Goals	Apps	Goals	Apps	Goals
LDU Quito	2001	Serie B	22	11	—		—				—		22	11
LDU Quito	2002	Serie A	37	16	—		—				0	0	37	16
LDU Quito	2003	Serie A	2	4	—		—				1	1	3	5
LDU Quito	Total		61	31	—		—				1	1	62	32
Al Nassr	2002–03	Pro League	16	15	—		0	0			0	0	16	15
Al Sadd	2003–04	QSL	14	18	4	10	0	0	0	0	4	1	22	29
Al Sadd	2004–05	QSL	8	5	0	0	0	0	3	2	4	1	15	8
Al Sadd	2005–06	QSL	25	21	0	0	2	1	1	0	7	5	34	27
Al Sadd	2006–07	QSL	21	5	3	12	3	2	3	2	4	0	33	21
Al Sadd	2007–08	QSL	17	13	0	0	3	2	2	1	5	1	27	17
Al Sadd	2008–09	QSL	3	1	0	0	2	1	0	0	0	0	5	2
Al Sadd	Total		88	63	7	22	8	6	9	5	24	8	134	104
Al-Nasr	2009–10	UAE Pro-League	15	18			+1	1	+2	3	0	0	+18	22
Al-Nasr	2010–11	UAE Pro-League	10	5	—			2			0	0	+10	7
Al-Nasr	2011–12	UAE Pro-League	0	0	—		4	2			0	0	4	2
Al-Nasr	Total		25	23	—		+5	5		3	0	0	+30	31
Vasco da Gama	2012	Série A	14	4	2	1	0	0			1	0	17	5
Vasco da Gama	2013	Série A	19	2	8	2	2	2			0	0	29	6
Vasco da Gama	Total		33	6	10	3	2	2			1	0	46	11
El Nacional	2014	Serie A	12	5	—		—				0	0	12	5
Bolívar	2014–15	LFP	34	16	—		—				2	0	36	16
Bolívar	2015 Apertura	LFP	21	7	—		—				1	0	22	7
Bolívar	Total		55	23	—		—				3	0	58	23
LDU Quito	2016	Serie A	22	3	—		—				4	0	26	3
Sport Boys	2017	LFP	2	0	—		—				5	1	7	1
Atlético Saquisilí	2018	Segunda Categoría	2	1	—		—		—				2	1
Career total			308	169	10	3	6	4			19	3	343	226

=== National team ===
Ecuador national team (Note: Although statistics on National-Football-Teams shows 50 matches, RSSSF appearances for Ecuador shows 52.)
Year	Apps	Goals
2001	1	0
2002	14	3
2003	6	1
2004	2	0
2005	3	0
2006	5	3
2007	11	3
2008	4	1
2009	4	1
Total	50	12

Scores and results list Ecuador's goal tally first, score column indicates score after each Tenorio goal.

List of international goals scored by Carlos Tenorio
No.	Date	Venue	Opponent	Score	Result	Competition	Ref.
1	12 February 2002	FUJIFILM Stadium, Breda, Netherlands	Turkey	1–0	1–0	Friendly	
2	27 March 2002	Giants Stadium, New York City, United States	Bulgaria	2–0	3–0	Friendly	
3	16 October 2002	Estadio Ricardo Saprissa Aymá, San Juan de Tibás, Costa Rica	Costa Rica	1–1	1–1	Friendly	
4	6 September 2003	Atahualpa Olympic Stadium, Quito, Ecuador	Venezuela	2–0	2–0	2006 FIFA World Cup qualification	
5	28 May 2006	Vallecas Stadium, Madrid, Spain	Macedonia	1–0	1–2	Friendly	
6	9 June 2006	Veltins-Arena, Gelsenkirchen, Germany	Poland	1–0	2–0	2006 FIFA World Cup	
7	15 June 2006	Volksparkstadion, Hamburg, Germany	Costa Rica	1–0	3–0	2006 FIFA World Cup	
8	18 January 2007	Estadio Alejandro Serrano Aguilar, Cuenca, Ecuador	Sweden	2–0	2–1	Friendly	
9	28 March 2007	Oakland Coliseum, Oakland, United States	Mexico	1–1	2–4	Friendly	
10	3 June 2007	Vicente Calderón Stadium, Madrid, Spain	Peru	1–1	1–2	Friendly	
11	26 March 2008	Estadio La Cocha, Latacunga, Ecuador	Haiti	3–1	3–1	Friendly	
12	7 June 2009	Estadio Monumental, Lima, Peru	Peru	2–1	2–1	2010 FIFA World Cup qualification	
