= Edivaldo Hermoza =

Bolivian footballer (born 1985)

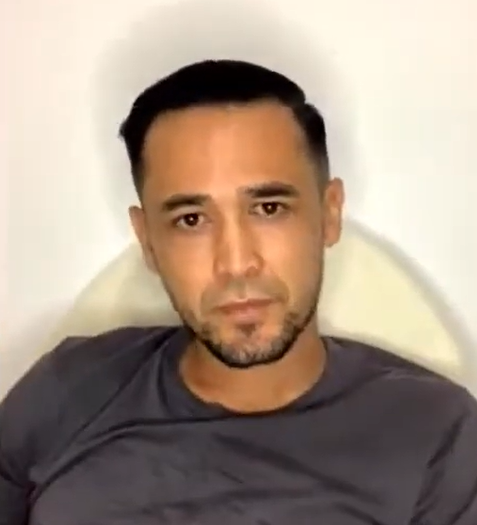
- Edivaldo in 2021

Personal information
- Full name: Edivaldo Rojas Hermoza
- Date of birth: 17 November 1985 (age 40)
- Place of birth: Cuiabá, Brazil
- Height: 1.81 m (5 ft 11 in)
- Position: Forward

Team information
- Current team: San Antonio Bulo Bulo (manager)

Youth career
- 2003: Atlético Paranaense

Senior career*
Years	Team	Apps	(Gls)
2004–2008	Atlético Paranaense	2	(0)
2005	→ Ferroviária (loan)	0	(0)
2005–2006	→ Figueirense (loan)	2	(0)
2006	→ Rio Preto (loan)	0	(0)
2006–2007	→ Caldense (loan)	0	(0)
2008	→ Guaratinguetá (loan)	0	(0)
2008–2012	Naval	106	(15)
2012–2014	Muangthong United	12	(5)
2013	→ Shonan Bellmare (loan)	3	(0)
2014–2015	Moreirense	13	(1)
2015–2016	Jorge Wilstermann	30	(6)
2016–2018	Sport Boys	88	(12)
2019	San José	12	(1)
2020–2021	Nueva Concepción	23	(2)
Total		291	(42)

International career
2011–2013	Bolivia	11	(1)

Managerial career
- 2025: San Antonio Bulo Bulo (assistant)
- 2025: The Strongest (assistant)
- 2026–: San Antonio Bulo Bulo
- * Club domestic league appearances and goals

Edivaldo Rojas Hermoza (born 17 November 1985), sometimes known as Bolívia, is a Bolivian football manager and former player who played as a forward. He is the current manager of San Antonio Bulo Bulo.

== Club career ==
Born in Cuiabá, Mato Grosso, to a Brazilian father and a Bolivian mother, Bolívia started his career at Clube Atlético Paranaense, signing a five-year contract with the club in August 2003. He made his Série A debut on 18 August 2004, against Figueirense Futebol Clube as a substitute.

On 1 April 2005, Bolívia was loaned to Associação Ferroviária de Esportes until the end of the São Paulo State League third division season. On 19 May, he joined Figueirense Futebol Clube of the top flight until the end of the campaign; on 1 February 2006 the loan was extended until 31 December but in March, he was loaned to Rio Preto Esporte Clube in the São Paulo second level.

Bolívia returned to Atlético in June 2006, and on 1 August he left for Associação Atlética Caldense in a nine-month loan. He scored 11 goals in the Minas Gerais Cup, but only found the net once in the Minas Gerais State League. After his return, he signed a new contract running until 30 April 2010, but appeared rarely for the side, being loaned for the fifth and last time in December 2007, now to Guaratinguetá Futebol, helping the team finish first in the group stage of the 2008 edition of the São Paulo State League and scoring once.

In July 2008, Bolívia was signed by Portuguese club Associação Naval 1º de Maio. In 2010–11, whilst changing his shirt name from Bolívia to Edivaldo – his given name was also spelled Edvaldo (without i) in some official documents – he only missed one game and netted four times, but the Figueira da Foz side were relegated from the Primeira Liga after six years.

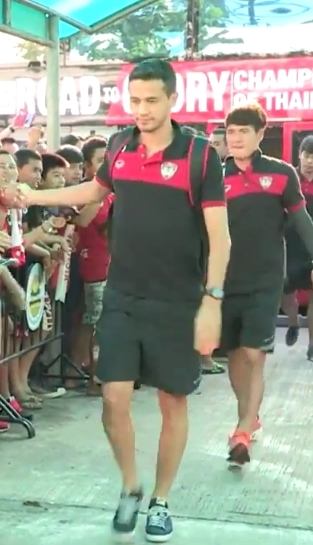
Edivaldo before a Thai Premier League game in 2013

After a brief spell in Asia with Muangthong United F.C. and Shonan Bellmare, Bolívia returned to the Portuguese top tier on 20 June 2014 by agreeing to a one-year deal with newly promoted Moreirense FC. He moved back to his country shortly after, going on to represent C.D. Jorge Wilstermann, Sport Boys Warnes and Club San José and winning the 2016 Clausura tournament with Wilstermann.

== International career ==
In April 2011, Edivaldo received a call-up from the Bolivia national team, being made eligible shortly after all the documentation issues had been resolved. He made his debut on 4 June against Paraguay, in the first leg of the year's Copa Paz del Chaco played in Santa Cruz de la Sierra (0–2 loss), and also appeared in the second match three days later (0–0).

Edivaldo scored the opening goal of the 2011 Copa América, in a 1–1 draw against hosts Argentina. He represented his country in four FIFA World Cup qualification matches.

=== International goals ===
#	Date	Venue	Opponent	Score	Result	Competition
1	1 July 2011	Estadio Ciudad de La Plata, La Plata, Argentina	Argentina	1–0	1–1	2011 Copa América

== Honours ==
Muangthong United

- Thai Premier League: 2012

Jorge Wilstermann

- Liga de Fútbol Profesional Boliviano: Clausura 2016
