= Ferreira (footballer, born 1986) =

Brazilian footballer

Personal information
- Full name: Leandro Ferreira Pessoa
- Date of birth: 15 July 1986 (age 40)
- Place of birth: São Caetano do Sul, Brazil
- Height: 1.80 m (5 ft 11 in)
- Position: Midfielder

Team information
- Current team: Atlético Cajazeirense

Youth career
- 2004–2006: Mauaense

Senior career*
Years	Team	Apps	(Gls)
2006–2007	União Suzano		
2008	Bragantino		
2008	Nacional-SP		
2009	Nacional-PR		
2009	ECUS		
2010	Osvaldo Cruz		
2011–2012	ECUS		
2013–2015	Sport Boys Warnes	106	(22)
2015	San José	6	(0)
2016	Blooming	32	(5)
2017–2018	Sport Boys Warnes	29	(1)
2019	Atlético Cajazeirense	10	(0)
2019	Campinense	8	(1)
2019–2024	Sampaio Corrêa	182	(3)
2020	→ Atlético Cajazeirense (loan)	7	(0)
2023	→ Operário Ferroviário (loan)	21	(0)
2025	Oeste	14	(0)
2025	North	14	(1)
2025–	Atlético Cajazeirense	4	(0)
- * Club domestic league appearances and goals as of 13 September 2025

Leandro Ferreira Pessoa (born 15 July 1986), simply known as Ferreira, is a Brazilian professional footballer who plays as a midfielder for Atlético Cajazeirense.

== Career ==
Born in São Caetano do Sul, Ferreira became famous playing for Bolivian football teams, especially Sport Boys Warnes, where he was Apertura champion in 2015, and for Sampaio Corrêa, where he arrived in 2019 and was part of winning four state titles, in addition to becoming the team captain with more than 160 appearances. Due to several years working in the country, Ferreira also has Bolivian citizenship.

After leaving Sampaio Corrêa, Ferreira defended the teams of Oeste, North, where he was champion of Módulo II, and Atlético Cajazeirense.

== Honours ==
Sport Boys Warnes

- Bolivian Primera División: 2015-A

Sampaio Corrêa

- Campeonato Maranhense: 2020, 2021, 2022, 2024

North

- Campeonato Mineiro Módulo II: 2025
