= Hilda Ordóñez =

Bolivian football manager (born 1973)

Personal information
- Full name: Hilda Ordóñez Andrade
- Date of birth: 21 September 1973
- Place of birth: Warnes, Santa Cruz; Bolivia

Managerial career
- Years: Team
- 2008–2012: Asociación Cruceña
- 2013: Sport Boys Warnes

Hilda Ordóñez Andrade (born 21 September 1973) is a female Bolivian football manager.

== Coaching career ==
Ordóñez started her coaching career in 2008 with the Cruceña Football Association. On 9 December 2013, she was appointed as manager of the Liga de Fútbol Profesional Boliviano club Sport Boys Warnes. She was the first and only Bolivian female manager in the men's league. Ordóñez gained only a draw and won a single point with the club before she resigned as coach. The club named the former Argentine player Néstor Clausen as a replacement for Ordoñez on 27 December 2013.

== Personal life ==
She worked for the job as head coach of Sport Boys Warnes as a teacher for physics at the Warnes, Santa Cruz de la Sierra based colegio Walter Asillas Bernal de Warnes. Ordóñez returned to the job as a teacher after her release by Sport Boys Warnes.
