= 2012–13 Liga de Fútbol Profesional Boliviano =

Liga de Fútbol Profesional Boliviano
- Season: 2012–13
- Champions: Apertura: The Strongest; Clausura: Bolívar
- Relegated: La Paz
- 2013 Copa Libertadores: The Strongest; San José; Bolívar
- 2013 Copa Sudamericana: The Strongest; Blooming; Real Potosí

The 2012–13 Liga de Fútbol Profesional Boliviano season was the 36th season of LFPB.

== Teams ==
The number of teams for 2012 remains the same. Real Mamoré finished last in the 2011 relegation table and was relegated to the Liga Nacional B for the first time since the club was founded. They were replaced by the 2011–12 Liga Nacional B champion Petrolero.

Locations of the 2011 LFPB teams

Team	Home city	Home stadium	Manager
Aurora	Cochabamba	Félix Capriles	Marcelo Neveleff
Blooming	Santa Cruz	Ramón Tahuichi Aguilera	Nestor Clausen
Bolívar	La Paz	Hernando Siles	Miguel Angel Portugal
Jorge Wilstermann	Cochabamba	Estadio Félix Capriles	Victor Hugo Andrada
La Paz	El Alto	Los Andes	Felix Berdeja
Nacional Potosí	Potosí	Víctor Agustín Ugarte	Carlos Leeb
Oriente Petrolero	Santa Cruz	Ramón Tahuichi Aguilera	Roberto Pompei
Petrolero	Yacuiba	Defensores de Villamontes	Sergio Apaza
Real Potosí	Potosí	Víctor Agustín Ugarte	Oscar Sanz
San José	Oruro	Jesús Bermúdez	Marco Ferrufino
The Strongest	La Paz	Hernando Siles	Eduardo Villegas
Universitario de Sucre	Sucre	Olímpico Patria	Javier Vega

== Torneo Apertura ==
=== Standings ===
Pos	Team	Pld	W	D	L	GF	GA	GD	Pts	Qualification
1	The Strongest	22	13	6	3	53	31	+22	45	2013 Copa Libertadores Second Stage and 2013 Copa Sudamericana First Stage (Note: The Strongest qualified for the 2013 Copa Libertadores Second Stage and the 2013 Copa Sudamericana First Stage as they finish as winners of both the 2011/12 Clausura and the 2012/13 Apertura.)
2	San José	22	12	5	5	51	35	+16	41	2013 Copa Libertadores Second Stage (Note: San José qualified for the 2013 Copa Libertadores Second Stage as runners-up of both the 2011/12 Clausura and the 2012/13 Apertura.)
3	Bolívar	22	11	4	7	46	31	+15	37	Copa Libertadores/Copa Sudamericana playoff (Note: As the first two berths of the 2013 Copa Libertadores are taken by The Strongest and San José, the third berth was decided by a playoff between the third-placed teams of the 2011/12 Clausura (Oriente Petrolero) and the 2012/13 Apertura (Bolívar).)
4	Blooming	22	11	2	9	29	30	−1	35	2013 Copa Sudamericana First Stage
5	Real Potosí	22	9	5	8	30	27	+3	32	2013 Copa Sudamericana First Stage
6	Oriente Petrolero	22	7	10	5	28	32	−4	31	
7	Jorge Wilstermann	22	7	7	8	34	35	−1	28	
8	Universitario de Sucre	22	5	10	7	31	32	−1	25	
9	Nacional Potosí	22	6	7	9	26	28	−2	25	
10	Petrolero	22	6	6	10	21	30	−9	24	
11	Aurora	22	6	4	12	31	47	−16	22	
12	La Paz	22	4	4	14	28	50	−22	16	

Updated to match(es) played on 1 December 2012. Source: Standings
Rules for classification: 1) points; 2) goal difference; 3) number of goals scored.

=== Results ===
Home \ Away	AUR	BLO	BOL	WIL	LPA	NAC	OPE	CPE	RPO	SJO	STR	UNI
Aurora		1–0	3–3	0–3	4–1	2–4	0–2	1–1	3–0	0–2	0–2	2–1
Blooming	3–2		1–0	3–0	3–0	1–0	1–1	2–0	3–1	3–2	2–1	2–0
Bolívar	3–1	1–0		4–1	3–0	4–2	4–1	0–1	1–0	2–4	2–3	0–0
Jorge Wilstermann	0–2	3–1	3–2		0–0	1–2	1–2	2–1	2–3	1–2	2–2	3–3
La Paz	0–3	2–0	1–4	1–2		0–2	3–4	4–1	3–0	2–2	1–3	0–2
Nacional Potosí	2–0	0–1	0–1	1–0	0–0		1–1	3–0	0–0	0–2	2–2	2–2
Oriente Petrolero	1–1	3–0	1–3	1–1	0–0	1–1		0–0	1–0	0–0	1–1	2–1
Petrolero	3–0	1–0	1–3	0–0	0–1	1–0	1–2		0–0	2–0	1–1	1–1
Real Potosí	2–1	3–0	2–1	1–1	4–2	1–0	4–1	0–0		4–1	2–2	2–0
San José	4–0	4–0	2–1	3–3	6–3	2–0	5–2	4–3	1–1		1–2	3–2
The Strongest	7–2	4–2	1–1	1–3	4–3	4–2	3–0	3–1	1–0	4–1		2–1
Universitario de Sucre	3–3	1–1	3–3	0–2	3–1	2–2	1–1	3–0	1–0	0–0	1–0	

Source: Soccerway.com
Legend: Blue = home team win; Yellow = draw; Red = away team win.

Liga de Fútbol Profesional Boliviano
2012 Torneo Apertura champion

10th title

== Copa Libertadores/Copa Sudamericana playoff ==
A playoff was contested between the third-placed teams of the 2011/12 Clausura (Oriente Petrolero) and the 2012/13 Apertura (Bolívar). The winner qualified for the 2013 Copa Libertadores First Stage, while the loser qualified for the 2013 Copa Sudamericana First Stage.

December 19, 2012
20:00 UTC−04:00

Bolívar	2–2	Oriente Petrolero
Penalties
	4–2

Estadio Félix Capriles, Cochabamba

== Torneo Clausura ==
=== Standings ===
Pos	Team	Pld	W	D	L	GF	GA	GD	Pts	Qualification
1	Bolívar	22	16	2	4	50	30	+20	50	2014 Copa Libertadores Second Stage
2	Oriente Petrolero	22	14	5	3	43	25	+18	47	2014 Copa Libertadores First Stage
3	San José	22	12	5	5	37	21	+16	41	2014 Copa Sudamericana First Stage
4	Universitario de Sucre	22	10	5	7	30	24	+6	35	
5	The Strongest	22	9	7	6	40	35	+5	34	
6	Jorge Wilstermann	22	9	6	7	43	30	+13	33	
7	Real Potosí	22	8	7	7	31	30	+1	31	
8	Blooming	22	6	5	11	31	40	−9	23	
9	Nacional Potosí	22	5	7	10	31	35	−4	22	
10	Aurora	22	6	4	12	28	43	−15	22	
11	Petrolero	22	5	5	12	24	40	−16	20	
12	La Paz	22	1	4	17	15	50	−35	7	

Updated to match(es) played on May 2013. Source:
Rules for classification: 1) points; 2) goal difference; 3) number of goals scored.

=== Results ===
Home \ Away	AUR	BLO	BOL	WIL	LPA	NAC	OPE	CPE	RPO	SJO	STR	UNI
Aurora		3–1	2–3	0–6	2–1	1–1	0–0	3–1	5–0	1–2	2–2	1–1
Blooming	2–0		2–1	2–3	4–1	2–1	2–2	2–0	4–0	1–1	3–4	0–1
Bolívar	4–2	3–1		5–3	1–0	2–1	2–1	2–0	2–1	2–1	1–1	2–2
Jorge Wilstermann	3–2	1–1	5–0		7–0	3–2	0–0	4–0	1–1	0–0	1–1	1–0
La Paz	0–1	1–1	1–3	0–1		1–5	0–2	1–1	0–0	3–1	1–2	0–1
Nacional Potosí	2–0	2–0	1–4	1–1	1–1		1–1	4–1	0–0	1–4	1–2	0–0
Oriente Petrolero	3–0	3–2	2–1	6–2	3–2	1–1		1–0	2–1	3–2	4–1	2–0
Petrolero	3–1	4–0	1–4	2–0	2–1	2–1	0–1		1–1	1–2	1–1	1–1
Real Potosí	1–0	4–0	0–2	2–1	3–1	3–1	3–1	1–1		0–0	2–3	2–1
San José	4–0	2–0	1–2	2–0	1–0	1–0	4–0	4–1	0–3		1–1	2–1
The Strongest	1–2	3–1	2–0	2–0	5–0	2–3	1–2	4–1	1–1	0–0		1–4
Universitario de Sucre	2–0	0–0	0–4	1–0	3–0	3–1	0–3	1–0	3–2	1–2	4–0	

Source: Soccerway.com
Legend: Blue = home team win; Yellow = draw; Red = away team win.

Liga de Fútbol Profesional Boliviano
2012 Torneo Clausura champion

18th title

== Top goalscorers ==
Rank	Player	Nationality	Club	Goals
1	Eduardo Fierro	Bolivian	Universitario de Sucre	15
2	William Ferreira	Uruguayan	Bolivar	13
3	Carlos Neumann	Paraguayan	Real Potosí	12
4	Vladimir Castellon	Bolivian	Aurora	10
5	Rudy Cardozo	Bolivian	Bolivar	9

Updated as of games played on May 6, 2013.

=== Poker Goals ===
Player	For	Against	Result	Date
(Bolivia) Eduardo Fierro	Universitario de Sucre	The Strongest	4–0	January 27, 2013

== Relegation ==
Pos	Team	2011–12 Pts	2012–13 Pts	Total Pts	Total Pld	Avg	Relegation
1	Oriente Petrolero	97	78	175	100	1.75	
2	Bolívar	87	87	174	100	1.74	
3	San José	90	82	172	100	1.72	
4	The Strongest	88	79	167	100	1.67	
5	Real Potosí	90	63	153	100	1.53	
6	Universitario de Sucre	85	57	145	100	1.45	
7	Blooming	82	58	140	100	1.4	
8	Aurora	91	44	135	100	1.35	
9	Jorge Wilstermann	—	58	58	44	1.3182	
10	Nacional Potosí	78	47	125	100	1.25	
11	Petrolero	—	44	44	44	1	Relegation Playoff Match
12	La Paz	55	23	78	100	0.78	Relegation to the Liga Nacional B

=== Relegation/promotion playoff ===
Team #1	Points	Team #2	1st leg	2nd leg	Playoff
Petrolero	2:5	Sport Boys	2–2	1–1	0–2
