= Eduardo Fierro =

Bolivian footballer (born 1988)

Personal information
- Full name: Juan Eduardo Fierro Rivera
- Date of birth: June 23, 1988 (age 38)
- Place of birth: Santa Cruz de la Sierra, Bolivia
- Height: 1.81 m (5 ft 11 1/2 in)
- Position: Striker

Team information
- Current team: Nacional Potosí
- Number: 18

Youth career
- 2003–2004: Blooming

Senior career*
| Years | Team | Apps | (Gls) |
| 2005–2007 | Blooming | 59 | (11) |
| 2008 | → La Paz (loan) | 25 | (8) |
| 2009–2010 | Blooming | 14 | (0) |
| 2010 | Oeste | 0 | (0) |
| 2011 | La Paz | 10 | (2) |
| 2011–2013 | Universitario de Sucre | 68 | (36) |
| 2013 | Sport Boys Warnes | 28 | (2) |
| 2014–2015 | Petrolero | 16 | (3) |
| 2015–2016 | Universitario de Sucre | 35 | (20) |
| 2016–2018 | Bolívar | 70 | (23) |
| 2019 | Sport Boys | 8 | (0) |
| 2020– | Nacional Potosí | 5 | (0) |

International career^{‡}
| 2007 | Bolivia U20 | 4 | (0) |
| 2013– | Bolivia | 3 | (0) |
- * Club domestic league appearances and goals as of 15:02, 29 July 2020 (UTC) ‡ National team caps and goals as of February 9, 2013

Juan Eduardo Fierro Rivera (born June 23, 1988, in Santa Cruz de la Sierra) is a Bolivian football who plays for Bolivian Primera División club Nacional Potosí and the Bolivia national team. He most often plays the role of a striker.

Eduardo is the son of former football defender Aldo Fierro, who played professionally for several teams in the Bolivian first division during the 1970s and 80's, as well as the Bolivia national team.

== Club career ==
Fierro started his career in the youth ranks of Club Blooming, where he worked his way up to the first team. He made his debut in first division in 2005. During his first period with the millonarios he made most of his appearances coming off the bench, and he was also often hindered with injuries. In 2008, he went on loan to play for La Paz F.C. When he arrived, he met the expectations with stunning demonstrations. Fierro had a successful season, scoring eight goals in 25 games. In 2009, Blooming gave him a second chance and brought him back to the club. He joined Brazilian club Oeste Futebol Clube in 2010.

== International career ==
On February 6, 2013, Fierro made his debut for the Bolivia national team in a friendly match against Haiti, having substituted Carlos Saucedo right after the first half. He represented his country in 1 FIFA World Cup qualification match.

== Honors ==
| Season | Team | Title |
|---|---|---|
| 2005 (A) | Blooming | Liga de Fútbol Profesional Boliviano |
| 2009 (C) | Blooming | Liga de Fútbol Profesional Boliviano |
