= Peredo =

Peredo is a surname. Notable people with the surname include:

- Daniel Peredo (1969–2018), Peruvian journalist, announcer and writer
- Julio César Pérez Peredo (born 1991), Bolivian footballer
- Melchor Peredo (1927–2026), Mexican muralist
- Osvaldo Peredo (1941–2021), Bolivian physician and revolutionary leader
- Rosalía Peredo, Mexican politician
