= Carlos Mendoza (footballer) =

Bolivian footballer (born 1992)

Personal information
- Full name: Carlos Enrique Mendoza Loayza
- Date of birth: 19 October 1992 (age 34)
- Place of birth: La Paz, Bolivia
- Height: 1.73 m (5 ft 8 in)
- Position: Left-back

Youth career
- 2008–2009: Miraflores
- 2010–2011: Huachipato

Senior career*
Years	Team	Apps	(Gls)
2011–2012	Huachipato	0	(0)
2012	→ Magallanes (loan)	2	(0)
2013–2015	Sport Boys Warnes	68	(1)
2015–2017	Real Potosí	54	(1)
2017–2018	Guabirá	11	(0)
2018	Always Ready	–	(–)
2019	Real Potosí	12	(0)
2019–2021	Fancesa	–	(–)
2021–2022	Universitario de Sucre	28	(0)
2022	Mojocoya FC	7	(0)
2023	Universitario de Pando	2	(0)

International career
2009	Bolivia U17		
- * Club domestic league appearances and goals

Carlos Enrique Mendoza Loayza (born October 19, 1992) is a Bolivian footballer who plays as a left-back.

== Club career ==
Mendoza played for Magallanes of the Primera B de Chile, on loan from Huachipato. With Huachipato, he was part of the squad that took part in the 2011 Copa Chile.

In 2014, Mendoza played for Sport Boys Warnes.

With Real Potosí, Mendoza took part in the 2016 Copa Sudamericana.

In 2023, Mendoza played for Universitario de Pando.

== International career ==
He played for Bolivia U-17 in the South American Under-17 Football Championship Chile 2009.

In October 2013, Mendoza was called up to the Bolivia senior team for the 2014 FIFA World Cup qualifiers.
