= 2012–13 Liga Nacional B =

The 2012–13 season of the Bolivian Liga Nacional B, the second category of Bolivian football, was played by 15 teams.

== Clubs ==
Club	Classification
Ciclón	2012 Copa Bolivia 2nd place
Enrique Happ	2012 Copa Bolivia Champion
Flamengo	Chuquisaca Championship
García Agreda	Tarija Championship
Guabirá	Relegated from 2011–12 Liga Nacional A
Municipalidad	Champions of Torneo Nacional Provincial
Oruro Royal	Oruro Championship
Real Mamoré	Relegated from 2011–12 Liga Nacional A
Sport Boys	2012 Copa Bolivia 3rd place
Unión Maestranza	La Paz Championship
Universidad de Santa Cruz	Santa Cruz Championship
Universitario (Beni)	Beni Championship
Universitario (San Simón)	Cochabamba Championship
Vaca Díez	Pando Championship
Wilstermann Cooperativas	Potosi Championship

== Hexagonal Final ==
=== Standings ===
Pos	Team	Pld	W	D	L	GF	GA	GD	Pts	Promotion or qualification
1	Guabirá	10	6	3	1	24	12	+12	21	2013–14 Primera División
2	Sport Boys	10	5	2	3	17	15	+2	17	Promotion Playoff
3	Ciclón	10	5	3	2	24	12	+12	18	
4	Real Santa Cruz	10	4	3	3	19	14	+5	15	
5	Oruro Royal	10	1	3	6	6	24	−18	6	
6	Flamengo de Sucre	10	0	4	6	7	20	−13	4	
