= 2015–16 Liga de Fútbol Profesional Boliviano =

Liga de Fútbol Profesional Boliviano
- Season: 2015–16
- Champions: Apertura: Sport Boys (1st Title); Clausura: Jorge Wilstermann (13th Title)
- Relegated: Ciclón
- 2017 Copa Libertadores: Sport Boys; Jorge Wilstermann; The Strongest; Universitario de Sucre
- 2017 Copa Sudamericana: Bolívar; Oriente Petrolero; Nacional Potosí; Petrolero

LFPB logo

The 2015–16 Liga de Fútbol Profesional Boliviano season was the 39th season of LFPB.

== Teams ==
The number of teams for 2014–15 remains the same. Universitario (P) was relegated to the Liga Nacional B. They were replaced by the 2014–15 Liga Nacional B champion Ciclón.

Locations of the 2015–16 LFPB teams

Team	Home city	Home stadium
Blooming	Santa Cruz	Ramón Tahuichi Aguilera
Bolívar	La Paz	Hernando Siles
Ciclón	Tarija	IV Centenario
Jorge Wilstermann	Cochabamba	Estadio Félix Capriles
Nacional Potosí	Potosí	Víctor Agustín Ugarte
Oriente Petrolero	Santa Cruz	Ramón Tahuichi Aguilera
Petrolero	Yacuiba	Defensores de Villamontes
Real Potosí	Potosí	Víctor Agustín Ugarte
San José	Oruro	Jesús Bermúdez
Sport Boys	Warnes	Samuel Vaca
The Strongest	La Paz	Hernando Siles
Universitario de Sucre	Sucre	Olímpico Patria

== Torneo Apertura ==
=== Standings ===
Pos	Team	Pld	W	D	L	GF	GA	GD	Pts	Qualification
1	Sport Boys	22	14	3	5	36	17	+19	45	2017 Copa Libertadores group stage
2	Bolívar	22	14	1	7	52	36	+16	43	
3	The Strongest	22	11	6	5	45	26	+19	39	
4	Universitario de Sucre	22	10	6	6	44	43	+1	36	
5	Oriente Petrolero	22	9	7	6	32	30	+2	34	
6	Jorge Wilstermann	22	8	9	5	34	30	+4	33	
7	Ciclón	22	9	3	10	31	38	−7	30	
8	Blooming	22	6	7	9	32	38	−6	25	
9	San José	22	6	6	10	31	37	−6	24	
10	Nacional Potosí	22	5	6	11	38	48	−10	21	
11	Petrolero	22	5	4	13	20	35	−15	19	
12	Real Potosí	22	5	2	15	31	48	−17	17	

Updated to match(es) played on December 18, 2015. Source: Standings
Rules for classification: 1) points; 2) goal difference; 3) number of goals scored.

== Torneo Clausura ==
=== Standings ===
Pos	Team	Pld	W	D	L	GF	GA	GD	Pts	Qualification
1	Jorge Wilstermann	22	13	5	4	39	28	+11	44	2017 Copa Libertadores group stage
2	The Strongest	22	11	5	6	36	24	+12	38	
3	Universitario de Sucre	22	9	9	4	38	26	+12	36	
4	Nacional Potosí	22	10	4	8	38	32	+6	34	
5	Oriente Petrolero	22	9	7	6	29	23	+6	34	
6	Petrolero	22	9	5	8	33	31	+2	32	
7	Bolívar	22	6	8	8	28	30	−2	26	
8	San José	22	6	7	9	30	34	−4	25	
9	Sport Boys	22	5	10	7	20	27	−7	25	
10	Real Potosí	22	7	3	12	31	41	−10	24	
11	Blooming	22	6	5	11	27	34	−7	23	
12	Ciclón	22	6	2	14	30	49	−19	20	

Updated to match(es) played on May 16, 2016. Source: Standings
Rules for classification: 1) points; 2) goal difference; 3) number of goals scored.

== Aggregate table ==
Pos	Team	Pld	W	D	L	GF	GA	GD	Pts	Qualification
1	The Strongest	44	22	11	11	81	50	+31	77	2017 Copa Libertadores Second stage
2	Jorge Wilstermann	44	21	14	9	73	58	+15	77	2017 Copa Libertadores Group stage
3	Universitario de Sucre	44	19	15	10	82	69	+13	72	2017 Copa Libertadores First stage
4	Sport Boys	44	19	13	12	56	44	+12	70	2017 Copa Libertadores Group stage
5	Bolívar	44	20	9	15	80	66	+14	69	2017 Copa Sudamericana First stage
6	Oriente Petrolero	44	18	14	12	61	53	+8	68	2017 Copa Sudamericana First stage
7	Nacional Potosí	44	15	10	19	76	80	−4	55	2017 Copa Sudamericana First stage
8	Petrolero	44	14	9	21	53	66	−13	51	2017 Copa Sudamericana First stage
9	Ciclón	44	15	5	24	61	87	−26	50	
10	San José	44	12	13	19	61	71	−10	49	
11	Blooming	44	12	12	20	59	72	−13	48	
12	Real Potosí	44	12	5	27	62	89	−27	41	

Updated to match(es) played on May 16, 2016. Source:
Rules for classification: 1) points; 2) goal difference; 3) number of goals scored.

== Relegation ==
Pos	Team	2014–15 Pts	2015–16 Pts	Total Pts	Total Pld	Avg	Relegation
1	Bolívar	92	69	161	88	1.8295	
2	The Strongest	79	77	156	88	1.7727	
3	Jorge Wilstermann	73	77	150	88	1.7045	
4	Oriente Petrolero	76	68	144	88	1.6364	
5	Universitario de Sucre	53	72	125	88	1.4205	
6	Blooming	66	48	114	88	1.2955	
7	San José	61	49	110	88	1.25	
8	Sport Boys	38	70	108	88	1.2273	
9	Real Potosí	63	41	104	88	1.1818	
10	Nacional Potosí	49	55	104	88	1.1818	
11	Petrolero	52	51	103	88	1.1705	Relegation Playoff Match
12	Ciclón	—	50	50	44	1.1364	Relegation to the Liga Nacional B

=== Relegation/promotion playoff ===
Team #1	Points	Team #2	1st leg	2nd leg	Playoff	Aggregate
Petrolero	6:0	Universitario de Beni	3–1	3–0	–	6–1

Petrolero remains at the season 2016–17 LFPB.

== Attendances ==
Rank	Club	Average
1	Jorge Wilstermann	8,974
2	Bolívar	8,270
3	The Strongest	7,662
4	Ciclón	5,753
5	Oriente Petrolero	4,851
6	Blooming	4,834
7	Club San José	4,798
8	Universitario de Sucre	4,571
9	Real Potosí	3,611
10	Sport Boys	3,076
11	Petrolero de Yacuiba	2,550
12	Nacional Potosí	1,820
