= 2012 Torneo Nacional Interprovincial =

The 2012 season of the Torneio Nacional Interprovincial is the second edition of the third tier of the Bolivian Football pyramid. In this edition will comprise the champions of the nine provincial championship and the host team from Tarija. The host cities are Yacuíba and Bermejo. The winners will be promoted to the 2012–13 Liga Nacional B, while the second place will compete in Copa Bolivia.

== Teams ==
Team (City)	Classification
Challapata	Oruro Championship
Municipalidad	Host team
Porvenir	Pando Championship
Real América	Potosi Championship
Real Candúa	Chuquisaca Championship
San Borja	Beni Championship
San José (Chiquitos)	Santa Cruz Championship
Sport Bermejo	Tarija Championship
Tiquiyapa	Cochabamba Championship
Viacha	La Paz Championship

== Group stage ==
=== Group A ===
Standings

Pos	Team	Pld	W	D	L	GF	GA	GD	Pts	Qualification
1	San José (Chiquitos)	4	4	0	0	15	1	+14	12	Advanced to the Semifinal
2	Sport Bermejo	4	3	0	1	10	2	+8	9	Advanced to the Semifinal
3	Challapata	4	2	0	2	8	10	−2	6	
4	Real América	4	1	0	3	5	17	−12	3	
5	Viacha	4	0	0	4	0	8	−8	0	

Round 1

August 17, 2012 Match 1	Challapata	0–5	San José	Bermejo, Tarija
14:00			Osmar Menacho (2); Marcelo Escalante; Darwin Figueroa; José Mercado	Stadium: Estadio Fabián Tintilay

August 17, 2012 Match 2	Atlético América	0–5	Sport Bermejo	Bermejo, Tarija
16:00			Jorge Luis Rodríguez (2); Dorian Moscoso; Paul Cruz; Sergio Jirón	Stadium: Estadio Fabián Tintilay

Round 2

August 18, 2012 Match 3 (w.o.)	Viacha	0–2	Atlético América	Bermejo, Tarija
14:00				Stadium: Estadio Fabián Tintilay

August 18, 2012 Match 4	Challapata	0–2	Sport Bermejo	Bermejo, Tarija
16:00			Paul Cruz; Luis Alejandro Tapia	Stadium: Estadio Fabián Tintilay

Round 3

August 19, 2012 Match 5	Atlético América	3–6	Challapata	Bermejo, Tarija
14:00	Carlos Martínez (2); José Luiz Fernández		Boris Uvas; Edwin Pillco (2); Raúl Canaviri (3)	Stadium: Estadio Fabián Tintilay

August 19, 2012 Match 6 (w.o.)	San José	2–0	Viacha	Bermejo, Tarija
16:00				Stadium: Estadio Fabián Tintilay

Round 4

August 20, 2012 Match 7	Atlético América	0–6	San José	Bermejo, Tarija
14:00			Darwin Figueroa (2); José Vaca (2); Osman Menacho; Raúl Rivero	Stadium: Estadio Fabián Tintilay

August 20, 2012 Match 8 (w.o.)	Sport Bermejo	2–0	Viacha	Bermejo, Tarija
16:00				Stadium: Estadio Fabián Tintilay

Round 5

August 21, 2012 Match 9 (w.o.)	Challapata	2–0	Viacha	Bermejo, Tarija
14:00				Stadium: Estadio Fabián Tintilay

August 21, 2012 Match 10	San José	2–1	Sport Bermejo	Bermejo, Tarija
16:00	Marcelo León; Osman Menacho		Norberto Sardina	Stadium: Estadio Fabián Tintilay

=== Group B ===
Standings

Pos	Team	Pld	W	D	L	GF	GA	GD	Pts	Qualification
1	Municipalidad	4	2	2	0	6	2	+4	8	Advanced to the Semifinal
2	Real Candúa	4	2	1	1	10	4	+6	7	Advanced to the Semifinal
3	San Borja	4	2	1	1	5	4	+1	7	
4	Porvenir	4	0	3	1	6	8	−2	3	
5	Tiquipaya	4	0	1	3	5	14	−9	1	

Round 1

August 17, 2012 Match 1	Real Candúa	0–2	Atlético San Borja	Yacuíba, Tarija
14:00			Fernando Moysa 26; Adan Barboza 87	Stadium: Estadio Néstor Paz Galarza; Attendance: 150

August 17, 2012 Match 2	Atlético Porvenir	2–2	Municipalidad	Yacuíba, Tarija
16:00	Iroshi Lunnawielf 48; Alex Giongaul 72		Efraín Figueroa 15; Luis Zenteno 60	Stadium: Estadio Néstor Paz Galarza; Attendance: 200

Round 2

August 18, 2012 Match 3	Tiquipaya	3–3	Atlético Porvenir	Yacuíba, Tarija
14:00	Adrián Saga 11; Celso Escóbar 52; Juan Pablo Quena 86		Elvis Fernández 24; Alex Guidi 36; Franz Zaga 69	Stadium: Estadio Néstor Paz Galarza

August 18, 2012 Match 4	Municipalidad	0–0	Real Candúa	Yacuíba, Tarija
16:00				Stadium: Estadio Néstor Paz Galarza

Round 3

August 19, 2012 Match 5	Tiquipaya	1–3	Atlético San Borja	Yacuíba, Tarija
14:00	Gerson Escóbar		Miguel Avendaño; Freddy Tórrez; Matías Limpias	Stadium: Estadio Néstor Paz Galarza

August 19, 2012 Match 6	Atlético Porvenir	1–3	Real Candúa	Yacuíba, Tarija
16:00				Stadium: Estadio Néstor Paz Galarza

Round 4

August 20, 2012 Match 7	Atlético San Borja	0–0	Atlético Porvenir	Yacuíba, Tarija
14:00				Stadium: Estadio Néstor Paz Galarza

August 20, 2012 Match 8	Municipalidad	1–0	Tiquipaya	Yacuíba, Tarija
16:00				Stadium: Estadio Néstor Paz Galarza

Round 5

August 21, 2012 Match 9	Real Candúa	7–1	Tiquipaya	Yacuíba, Tarija
14:00	Brayan Bonilla 8 Jhon Benavidez 25; Juan Carlos Gutiérrez 24, 70; Oscar Chávez 32, 86; Lucio León 51		Adrián Luizaga 60	Stadium: Estadio del Club Independiente

August 21, 2012 Match 10	Atlético San Borja	0–3	Municipalidad	Yacuíba, Tarija
16:00			Luis Alberto Zenteno 52; Nildo Ríos 62; Roberto Carlos Barja 82	Stadium: Estadio Néstor Paz Galarza

== Semifinals ==
August 23, 2012 Match 1	San José de Chiquitos	1–1 (5-4 p)	Real Candúa	Yacuíba, Tarija
14:00				Stadium: Estadio Néstor Paz Galarza

August 23, 2012 Match 2	Municipalidad	4–0	Sport Bermejo	Yacuíba, Tarija
16:00	Luis Alberto Zenteno 37; Hugo Agüero 46; Nildo Ríos 80, 87			Stadium: Estadio Néstor Paz Galarza

== 3rd Place Playoff ==
August 24, 2012 Match 1	Sport Bermejo	2-2 (3-5 p)	Real Candúa	Yacuíba, Tarija
14:00				Stadium: Estadio Néstor Paz Galarza

== Final ==
August 24, 2012 Match 1	Municipalidad	1-1 (5-3 p)	San José de Chiquitos	Yacuíba, Tarija
16:00	Nildo Ríos (pen) 84		José Mercado 57	Stadium: Estadio Néstor Paz Galarza
