= 2011–12 Liga Nacional B =

The 2011–12 season of the Bolivian Liga Nacional B, the second category of Bolivian football, was played by 13 teams.

== Teams ==
Team	Classification
ABB	La Paz Championship
Destroyers	Relegated from 2007 Liga Nacional A*
Enrique Happ	Cochabamba Championship
Flamengo	Chuquisaca Championship
García Agreda	Runner-up of Tarija Championship
Jorge Wilstermann	Relegated from 2010 Liga Nacional A
JV Mariscal	Champions of Torneo Nacional Interprovincial
Oruro Royal	Oruro Championship
Petrolero	Tarija Championship
Stormers San Lorenzo	Potosi Championship
Universidad de Santa Cruz	Santa Cruz Championship
Universitario	Beni Championship
Vaca Díez	Pando Championship

- Guabirá (relegated in 2008) and Nacional Potosí (relegated in 2009) will play in the 2011–12 Liga Nacional A.

== Group stage ==
=== Serie A ===
Pos	Team	Pld	W	D	L	GF	GA	GD	Pts	Qualification
1	Petrolero	12	7	3	2	22	11	+11	24	Advanced to the Cuadrangular Final
2	Destroyers	12	6	3	3	21	12	+9	21	Advanced to the Cuadrangular Final
3	Flamengo	12	5	4	3	21	15	+6	19	
4	García Agreda	12	4	5	3	13	10	+3	17	
5	Oruro Royal	12	3	3	6	20	22	−2	12	
6	ABB	12	3	2	7	14	25	−11	11	
7	Stormers San Lorenzo	12	2	4	6	17	33	−16	10	

=== Serie B ===
Pos	Team	Pld	W	D	L	GF	GA	GD	Pts	Qualification
1	Universidad de Santa Cruz	10	7	0	3	22	11	+11	21	Advanced to the Cuadrangular Final
2	Jorge Wilstermann	10	6	3	1	14	6	+8	21	Advanced to the Cuadrangular Final
3	Enrique Happ	10	5	3	2	18	14	+4	18	
4	JV Mariscal	10	3	1	6	15	22	−7	10	
5	Universitario (Beni)	10	2	3	5	12	19	−7	9	
6	Vaca Diez	10	1	2	7	8	17	−9	5	

== Cuadrangular Final ==
=== Standings ===
Pos	Team	Pld	W	D	L	GF	GA	GD	Pts	Qualification
1	Destroyers	6	2	3	1	5	4	+1	9	Tiebreaker Playoff
2	Petrolero	6	2	3	1	9	9	0	9	Tiebreaker Playoff
3	Jorge Wilstermann	6	2	2	2	10	10	0	8	Promotion Playoff
4	Universidad de Santa Cruz	6	1	3	2	8	9	−1	6	

=== Tiebreaker Playoff ===
April 22, 2012
15:00 UTC−04:00

Destroyers	1–3	Petrolero
Eder Cuéllar 32'	Report	Omar Morales 6', Edgard Olivares 45', Martín Palavicini 68'

Estadio Félix Capriles, Cochabamba
Attendance: 6.152
Referee: Alejandro Mancilla (Beni)
- Petrolero promoted to 2012–13 Primera División
- Destroyers go to Promotion Playoff.
