= 2011 Torneo Nacional Interprovincial =

The 2011 season of the Torneio Nacional Interprovincial is the first edition of the third tier of the Bolivian Football pyramid. The inaugural season is played with 8 provincial champions (Cochabamba FA was suspended). The host city of this edition is Santa Cruz. The winners was promoted to the 2011-12 Liga Nacional B.

The champions were JV Mariscal.

== Teams ==
Team (City)	Classification
JV Mariscal (El Alto)	La Paz Championship
Abaroa (Camargo)	Chuquisaca Championship
Caracollo (Cercado)	Oruro Championship
Juventud Unida (Yacuiba)	Tarija Championship
Economía de Uncía (Uncía)	Potosi Championship
Colegio Seminario San Ignacio (San Ignacio)	Santa Cruz Championship
Atlético San Borja (San Borja)	Beni Championship
Las Piedras (Cobija)	Pando Championship

=== Semifinals ===
July 16, 2011 Match 1	Atlético San Borja	0–0 (1–3 p)	JV Mariscal	San Ignacio de Velasco, Santa Cruz
13:30				Stadium: Estadio Municipal de San Ignacio de Velasco

July 16, 2011 Match 2	Seminario	1–1 (1–3 p)	Juventud Unida	San Ignacio de Velasco, Santa Cruz
15:30				Stadium: Estadio Municipal de San Ignacio de Velasco

=== Final ===
July 17, 2011 Final	JV Mariscal	0–0 (5–4 p)	Juventud Unida	San Ignacio de Velasco, Santa Cruz
15:00				Stadium: Estadio Municipal de San Ignacio de Velasco
