= Melchor Peredo =

Mexican muralist (1927–2026)

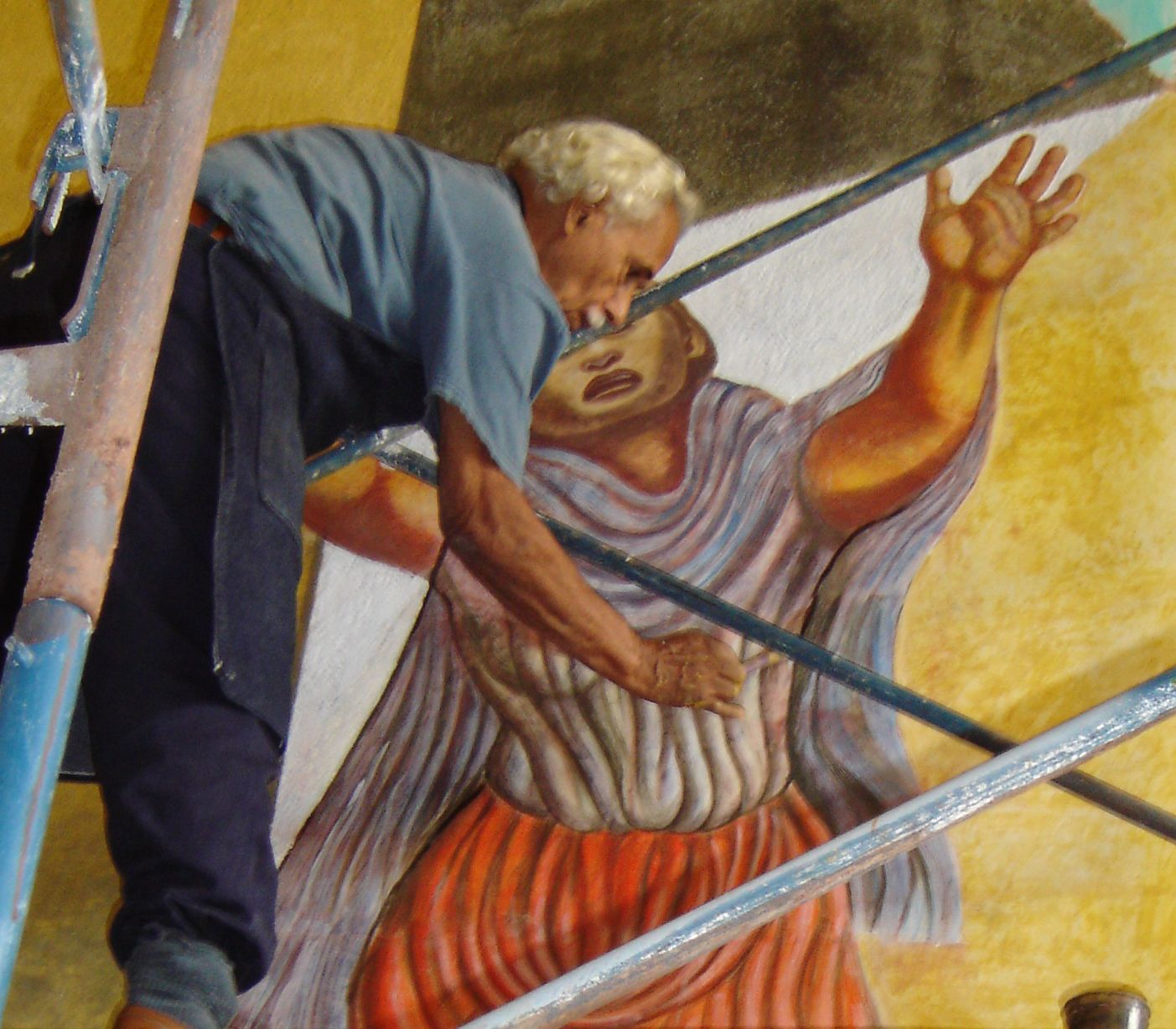
- Melchor Peredo in the Palacio de Gobierno, Xalapa, Veracruz
- Born: Óscar Melchor Peredo y García; 6 January 1927; Mexico City, Mexico
- Died: 8 April 2026 (aged 99); Xalapa, Veracruz, Mexico
- Education: National School of Arts
- Known for: Painting, Muralist
- Movement: Mexican Mural Movement, Social Realism

Óscar Melchor Peredo y García (Note: In this Mexican name, the surname is Peredo and the second or maternal family name is García.) (6 January 1927 – 8 April 2026) was a Mexican muralist and a representative of the social realist school of mural painting in Mexico. His murals depict scenes from Mexican history with an emphasis on revolutionary subjects. His work is featured in public and government buildings across Mexico. He also painted murals in the USA and Europe.

== Life and career ==
Melchor was born in Mexico City on 6 January 1927. His father Luis G. Peredo was a journalist during the 1910 Mexican Revolution and became a pioneer of Mexican cinema. In 1918 Luis directed the silent film Santa based on the 1903 naturalist novel by Federico Gamboa. At the age of eleven, inspired by the work of muralists Diego Rivera, José Clemente Orozco, and David Alfaro Siqueiros, Melchor decided to become a painter. He studied at several major art institutes in Mexico City including the Escuela La Esmeralda and the National School of Arts. He painted his first mural in 1947 in a maternity clinic, depicting the exploitation of marginalized workers in Mexico City.

In 1953, he joined the Frente Nacional de Artes Plásticas and was commissioned as a representative to assist at the IV World Youth Festival for Peace in Romania. The art critic Judith Krauss made arrangements for him to stay in Bucharest but he decided that the most important movement was in Mexico and returned home to join a research workshop funded by the National Polytechnic Institute. There he perfected his fresco technique under the guidance of José Gutierrez, a proponent of the first artistic use of acrylic paint.

Melchor Peredo died in Xalapa, Veracruz, on 8 April 2026, at the age of 99.

== List of murals ==
- Arribo al Mictlán, Maternidad Guadalupe, Los Reyes de la Paz, Estado de México, 1947
- Buceadores, Club Sirocco, Acapulco, Guerrero, 1950
- Resistencia Heroica (fresco-acrílico), Palacio de Justicia del Estado de Veracruz, Xalapa, Veracruz, 1980
- La Historia de la Cultura en Veracruz (segunda parte del mural del Palacio de Justicia de Veracruz), 1982
- 6 murales en la Universidad de París XII, 1983
- Magisterio Heroico (fresco), Escuela de Bachilleres Constitución de 1917, Xalapa, Veracruz, 1991
- El Desembarco en Chalchihueyecan (acrílico), Escuela de Bachilleres Ilustre Instituto Veracruzano, Boca del Río, Veracruz, 1992
- Por una Humanidad sin Fronteras, Centro de idiomas de la Universidad Veracruzana, 2000
- Cultural Heritage (4 panels al fresco), Harton Theatre, Southern Arkansas University, Magnolia, Southern Arkansas, EUA, 2000
- El Canto de Amalia, Museo de la Universidad de Sonora, Hermosillo, Sonora, 2000
- Human Diversity without war (óleo-resina), Hendrix Students Center, Clemson University Clemson, South Carolina, EUA, 2001
- Coatepec en la Cultura (acrílico), Palacio Municipal de Coatepec, Coatepec, Veracruz, 2002
- Una nueva raza abierta al porvenir (mosaico de talavera), La Antigua, Veracruz, 2004
- Homenaje a Ignacio de la Llave y La Reforma (fresco), Escalera del Palacio de Gobierno, Xalapa, Veracruz, 2004
- Una revolución continua (fresco), vestíbulo del Palacio de Gobierno, Xalapa, Veracruz, 2010

== See also ==
- Mexican Muralism
