= Copa Bolivia (Ascenso) =

- Founded: 2012
- Folded: 2016
- Country: Bolivia
- Confederation: CONMEBOL
- Number of clubs: 12
- Level on pyramid: 3
- Promotion to: Liga Nacional B
- Last champions: Destroyers (2016)

Copa Bolivia was the third tier of the Bolivian Football pyramid. The inaugural season was played in 2012, and the last season was played in 2016. The Copa Bolivia comprised the nine runners-up of the Regional Leagues, the runners-up of the Torneo Nacional Interprovincial and two invited teams. The best three teams of the competition were promoted to the Liga Nacional B.

Teams had to use at least one U-20 player throughout any match; likewise, the number of non-Bolivian players was limited to a maximum of four players at any given point of a match.

== List of Champions ==
Ed.	Season	Champion	Runner-up
1	2012	Enrique Happ Real Trópico	Ciclón
2	2013	ABB	García Agreda
3	2014	El Torno	Atlético Bermejo
4	2015	Royal Pari	Arauco Prado
5	2016	Destroyers	Always Ready

== Titles by club ==
Club	Titles	Seasons won
ABB	1	2013
Destroyers	1	2016
Enrique Happ Real Trópico	1	2012
El Torno	1	2014
Royal Pari	1	2015

== See also ==
- Copa Bolivia
