= 2011–12 Liga de Fútbol Profesional Boliviano =

Liga de Fútbol Profesional Boliviano
- Season: 2011–12
- Champions: Apertura: The Strongest; Clausura: The Strongest
- Relegated: Guabirá; Real Mamoré
- 2012 Copa Libertadores: The Strongest
- 2012 Copa Sudamericana: Universitario; Aurora; Blooming
- 2013 Copa Libertadores: The Strongest; San José
- 2013 Copa Sudamericana: Oriente Petrolero

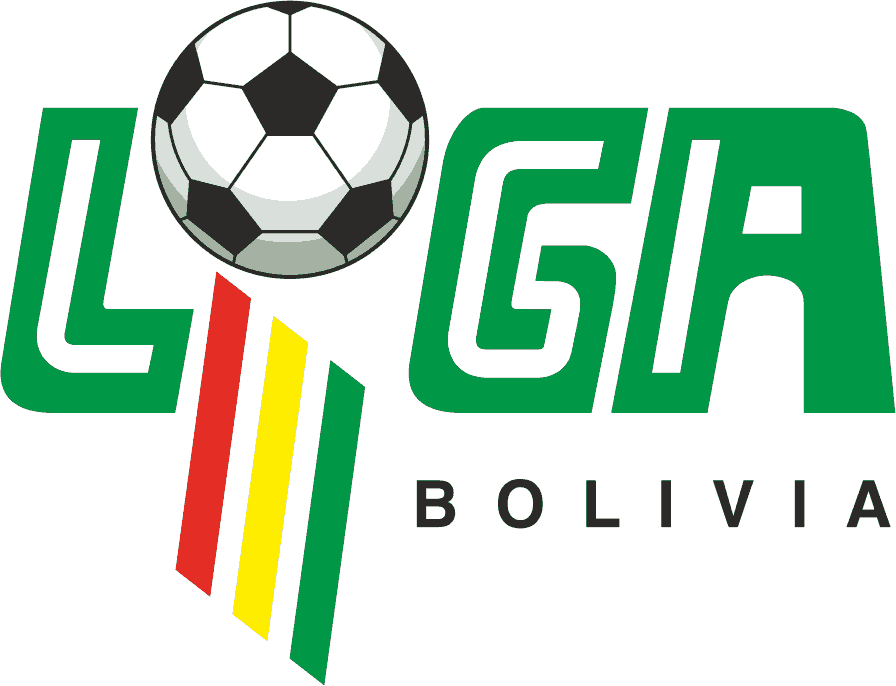

The 2011–12 Liga de Fútbol Profesional Boliviano season was the 35th season of LFPB.

== Teams ==
The number of teams for 2011 remains the same. Jorge Wilstermann finished last in the 2010 relegation table and was relegated to the Bolivian Football Regional Leagues (and the new Nacional B second division) for the first time since the club was founded. They were replaced by the 2010 Copa Simón Bolívar champion Nacional Potosí, who last played in the LFPB in 2009.

Locations of the 2011 LFPB teams

Team	Home city	Home stadium	Manager
Aurora	Cochabamba	Félix Capriles	Julio César Baldivieso
Blooming	Santa Cruz	Ramón Tahuichi Aguilera	Fernando Quiroz
Bolívar	La Paz	Hernando Siles	Guillermo Ángel Hoyos
Guabirá	Montero	Gilberto Parada	Claudio Marrupe
La Paz	El Alto	Los Andes	Oscar Sanz
Nacional Potosí	Potosí	Víctor Agustín Ugarte	Julio Alberto Zamora
Oriente Petrolero	Santa Cruz	Ramón Tahuichi Aguilera	Carlos Ramacciotti
Real Mamoré	Trinidad	Estadio Gran Mamoré	Luis Esteban Galarza
Real Potosí	Potosí	Víctor Agustín Ugarte	Dalcio Giovagnoli
San José	Oruro	Jesús Bermúdez	Marco Ferrufino
The Strongest	La Paz	Hernando Siles	Mauricio Soria
Universitario de Sucre	Sucre	Olímpico Patria	Eduardo Villegas

== Torneo Apertura ==
=== First phase ===
==== Standings ====
===== Serie A =====
Pos	Team	Pld	W	D	L	GF	GA	GD	Pts	Qualification
1	Bolívar	12	5	4	3	22	12	+10	19	Advanced to the Second phase
2	Universitario de Sucre	12	5	4	3	17	14	+3	19	Advanced to the Second phase
3	Guabirá	12	6	1	5	16	23	−7	19	Advanced to the Second phase
4	San José	12	5	3	4	10	7	+3	18	Advanced to the Second phase
5	Real Potosí	12	4	5	3	20	11	+9	17	
6	Blooming	12	2	4	6	11	22	−11	10	

Rules for classification: 1st points; 2nd goal difference; 3rd number of goals scored.

===== Serie B =====
Pos	Team	Pld	W	D	L	GF	GA	GD	Pts	Qualification
1	Aurora	12	8	0	4	23	13	+10	24	Advanced to the Second phase
2	Oriente Petrolero	12	7	2	3	26	18	+8	23	Advanced to the Second phase
3	Nacional Potosí	12	4	4	4	23	15	+8	16	Advanced to the Second phase
4	The Strongest	12	4	3	5	34	23	+11	15	Advanced to the Second phase
5	La Paz	12	4	2	6	16	29	−13	14	
6	Real Mamoré	12	2	0	10	10	41	−31	6	

Rules for classification: 1st points; 2nd goal difference; 3rd number of goals scored.

==== Results ====
Home \ Away	AUR	BLO	BOL	GUA	LPA	NAC	OPE	RMA	RPO	SJO	STR	UNI
Aurora					2–0	2–0	0–3	3–1		2–0	2–1	
Blooming			1–0	1–3			1–2		1–1	0–0		1–1
Bolívar		2–0		6–1					1–1	0–0	3–1	1–2
Guabirá		0–2	1–0					2–0	3–2	1–0		2–2
La Paz	1–5					0–4	1–0	3–1			3–3	2–1
Nacional Potosí	1–2				0–0		4–2	9–0	0–0		2–1	
Oriente Petrolero	2–1	1–1			3–1	4–1		4–1			1–1	
Real Mamoré	0–2			0–2	2–3	2–0	1–4				1–0	
Real Potosí		5–0	1–3	6–0		0–0				0–2		1–0
San José	2–1	3–0	0–0	2–0					0–2			0–1
The Strongest	2–1		3–5		6–2	2–2	5–0	9–1				
Universitario de Sucre		4–3	1–1	2–1	2–0				1–1	0–1		

Source: Soccerway.com
Legend: Blue = home team win; Yellow = draw; Red = away team win.

=== Second phase ===
Quarterfinals
B1	Aurora	0	0	0
A4	San José	1	2	3
A2	Universitario de Sucre	3	1	4
B3	Nacional Potosí	2	0	2
B2	Oriente Petrolero	0	4	4
A3	Guabirá	0	1	1
B4	The Strongest	0	4	4
A1	Bolívar	1	0	1

Semifinals
A4	San José	0	1	1
A2	Universitario de Sucre	2	0	2
B2	Oriente Petrolero	3	1	4
B4	The Strongest	5	0	5

Final
A2	Universitario de Sucre	0	1	1
B4	The Strongest	2	1	3
Third place
A4	San José	1	1	2
B2	Oriente Petrolero	1	2	3

==== Quarterfinals ====
===== Quarterfinals 1 =====
Pos	Team	Pld	W	D	L	GF	GA	GD	Pts	Qualification
1	San José	2	2	0	0	3	0	+3	6	Advanced to the Semifinals
2	Aurora	2	0	0	2	0	3	−3	0	2012 Copa Sudamericana First Stage (Note: San José included five foreign players in the first leg, and was later penalized. As a result, Aurora qualified for the 2012 Copa Sudamericana in place of San José, which finished fourth in the Apertura (Oriente Petrolero, which finished third in the Apertura, had already qualified for the 2012 Copa Sudamericana as the 2011 Adecuación 3rd place).)

Rules for classification: 1st points; 2nd goal difference; 3rd play-off game.
Notes:
December 4, 2011
15:00 UTC−04:00

San José	1–0	Aurora
Andrada 86'	Report

Estadio Jesús Bermúdez, Oruro

December 7, 2011
20:00 UTC−04:00

Aurora	0–2	San José
	Report	Pintos 1'; Vieira 56'

Estadio Félix Capriles, Cochabamba

===== Quarterfinals 2 =====
Pos	Team	Pld	W	D	L	GF	GA	GD	Pts	Qualification
1	Universitario de Sucre	2	2	0	0	4	2	+2	6	Advanced to the Semifinals
2	Nacional Potosí	2	0	0	2	2	4	−2	0	

Rules for classification: 1st points; 2nd goal difference; 3rd play-off game.
December 4, 2011
16:00 UTC−04:00

Nacional Potosí	2–3	Universitario de Sucre
Ríos 41' (pen.); Gastón 63'	Report	Jeferson 45'; Olivares 56'; Alfaro 61'

Estadio Victor Agustín Ugarte, Potosí

December 7, 2011
20:00 UTC−04:00

Universitario de Sucre	1–0	Nacional Potosí
Gomes 48' (pen.)	Report

Estadio Olímpico Patria, Sucre

===== Quarterfinals 3 =====
Pos	Team	Pld	W	D	L	GF	GA	GD	Pts	Qualification
1	Oriente Petrolero	2	1	1	0	4	1	+3	4	Advanced to the Semifinals
2	Guabirá	2	0	1	1	1	4	−3	1	

Rules for classification: 1st points; 2nd goal difference; 3rd play-off game.
December 4, 2011
18:00 UTC−04:00

Guabirá	0–0	Oriente Petrolero
	Report

Estadio Gilberto Parada, Montero

December 7, 2011
20:30 UTC−04:00

Oriente Petrolero	4–1	Guabirá
Meleán 2'; Mojica 15', 60', 64'	Report	Ríos 19'

Estadio Tahuichi Aguilera, Santa Cruz

===== Quarterfinals 4 =====
Pos	Team	Pld	W	D	L	GF	GA	GD	Pts	Qualification
1	The Strongest	2	1	0	1	4	1	+3	3	Advanced to the Semifinals
2	Bolívar	2	1	0	1	1	4	−3	3	

Rules for classification: 1st points; 2nd goal difference; 3rd play-off game.
December 3, 2011
20:00 UTC−04:00

Bolívar	1–0	The Strongest
Ferreira 49'	Report

Estadio Hernando Siles, La Paz

December 7, 2011
20:00 UTC−04:00

The Strongest	4–0	Bolívar
Escobar 6', 74'; Lima 50'; Chumacero 77'	Report

Estadio Hernando Siles, La Paz

==== Semifinals ====
===== Semifinals 1 =====
Pos	Team	Pld	W	D	L	GF	GA	GD	Pts	Qualification
1	Universitario de Sucre	2	1	0	1	2	1	+1	3	Advanced to the Finals
2	San José	2	1	0	1	1	2	−1	3	Advanced to the Third-place finals

Rules for classification: 1st points; 2nd goal difference; 3rd play-off game.
December 11, 2011
19:30 UTC−04:00

Universitario de Sucre	2–0	San José
Castilla 59', 64'	Report

Estadio Olímpico Patria, Sucre

December 14, 2011
16:00 UTC−04:00

San José	1–0	Universitario de Sucre
Loayza 19'	Report

Estadio Jesús Bermúdez, Oruro

===== Semifinals 2 =====
Pos	Team	Pld	W	D	L	GF	GA	GD	Pts	Qualification
1	The Strongest	2	1	0	1	5	4	+1	3	Advanced to the Finals
2	Oriente Petrolero	2	1	0	1	4	5	−1	3	Advanced to the Third-place finals

Rules for classification: 1st points; 2nd goal difference; 3rd play-off game.
December 12, 2011
17:00 UTC−04:00

The Strongest	5–3	Oriente Petrolero
Bejarano 31'; Soliz 59'; Escobar 66'; Melgar 70'; Lima 79'	Report	Delorte 10'; Mojica 25'; Arce 53'

Estadio Hernando Siles, La Paz

December 14, 2011
20:30 UTC−04:00

Oriente Petrolero	1–0	The Strongest
Mojica 35' (pen.)	Report

Estadio Tahuichi Aguilera, Santa Cruz

==== Third-place finals ====
Pos	Team	Pld	W	D	L	GF	GA	GD	Pts
1	Oriente Petrolero	2	1	1	0	3	2	+1	4
2	San José	2	0	1	1	2	3	−1	1

Rules for classification: 1st points; 2nd goal difference; 3rd play-off game.
December 18, 2011
18:00 UTC−04:00

Oriente Petrolero	1–1	San José
Galindo 15'	Report	Albarracín 49'

Estadio Tahuichi Aguilera, Santa Cruz

December 21, 2011
16:00 UTC−04:00

San José	1–2	Oriente Petrolero
Loayza 52'	Report	Galindo 44'; Aguirre 68'

Estadio Jesús Bermúdez, Oruro

==== Finals ====
Pos	Team	Pld	W	D	L	GF	GA	GD	Pts	Qualification
1	The Strongest	2	1	1	0	3	1	+2	4	2012 Copa Libertadores Second Stage
2	Universitario de Sucre	2	0	1	1	1	3	−2	1	2012 Copa Sudamericana First Stage

Rules for classification: 1st points; 2nd goal difference; 3rd play-off game.
December 18, 2011
16:00 UTC−04:00

The Strongest	2–0	Universitario de Sucre
Melgar 45'; Parada 90'	Report

Estadio Hernando Siles, La Paz

December 22, 2011
20:00 UTC−04:00

Universitario de Sucre	1–1	The Strongest
Jeferson 87'	Report	Escobar 5'

Estadio Olímpico Patria, Sucre

Liga de Fútbol Profesional Boliviano
2011 Torneo Apertura champion

8th title

=== Top goalscorers ===
Rank	Player	Player nationality	Club	Goals
1	William Ferreira	Uruguayan	Bolívar	16
2	Pablo Escobar	Bolivian	The Strongest	13
3	Gualberto Mojica	Bolivian	Oriente Petrolero	12
4	Darwin Ríos	Bolivian	Guabirá	7

== Torneo Clausura ==
=== Standings ===
Pos	Team	Pld	W	D	L	GF	GA	GD	Pts	Qualification
1	The Strongest	22	11	5	6	47	28	+19	38	2013 Copa Libertadores Second Stage
2	San José	22	11	5	6	43	27	+16	38	2013 Copa Libertadores Second Stage (Note: San José qualified for the 2013 Copa Libertadores Second Stage as runners-up of both the 2011/12 Clausura and the 2012/13 Apertura.)
3	Oriente Petrolero	22	11	5	6	38	30	+8	38	Copa Libertadores/Copa Sudamericana playoff (Note: As the first two berths of the 2013 Copa Libertadores are taken by The Strongest and San José, the third berth was decided by a playoff between the third-placed teams of the 2011/12 Clausura (Oriente Petrolero) and the 2012/13 Apertura (Bolívar).)
4	Universitario de Sucre	22	11	4	7	36	21	+15	37	
5	Blooming	22	11	4	7	28	23	+5	37	2012 Copa Sudamericana First Stage (Note: Blooming qualified for the 2012 Copa Sudamericana as fourth-placed Universitario had already qualified as the Apertura runner-up.)
6	Real Potosí	22	11	2	9	36	32	+4	35	
7	Aurora	22	10	4	8	38	30	+8	34	
8	Nacional Potosí	22	10	4	8	33	36	−3	34	
9	Bolívar	22	6	10	6	34	27	+7	28	
10	La Paz	22	7	3	12	29	39	−10	24	
11	Real Mamoré	22	5	3	14	16	47	−31	18	
12	Guabirá	22	1	5	16	19	57	−38	8	

Updated to match(es) played on 13 May 2012. Source: Standings
Rules for classification: 1) points; 2) goal difference; 3) number of goals scored.
Notes:

Liga de Fútbol Profesional Boliviano
2012 Torneo Clausura champion

9th title

==== Results ====
Home \ Away	AUR	BLO	BOL	GUA	LPA	NAC	OPE	RMA	RPO	SJO	STR	UNI
Aurora		3–0	2–2	3–1	1–1	4–0	3–1	5–0	2–0	1–1	3–2	0–2
Blooming	2–0		2–0	2–0	2–2	2–0	2–2	1–1	2–0	2–0	3–0	0–1
Bolívar	1–1	5–0		0–0	4–0	4–3	1–2	6–0	2–2	2–0	0–1	0–0
Guabirá	2–0	0–0	1–1		2–3	1–1	0–1	0–2	1–2	2–3	1–3	0–2
La Paz	2–1	0–4	1–1	4–1		0–1	0–1	6–0	0–2	1–3	1–3	2–1
Nacional Potosí	2–0	3–1	1–1	4–1	2–1		2–2	4–2	2–0	1–4	1–0	0–2
Oriente Petrolero	4–1	2–0	1–1	2–0	4–0	2–0		1–2	0–2	2–1	1–1	2–1
Real Mamoré	1–2	0–1	1–2	0–0	0–1	1–2	2–1		1–0	0–1	1–1	1–0
Real Potosí	2–1	0–1	2–0	6–2	1–2	1–2	3–2	4–0		2–1	2–1	2–1
San José	1–2	2–0	3–0	6–2	2–1	3–0	2–2	3–0	1–0		1–2	1–1
The Strongest	1–2	2–0	1–1	8–1	1–0	3–1	5–1	4–0	3–3	2–2		2–1
Universitario de Sucre	2–1	0–1	3–0	4–1	2–1	1–1	1–2	2–1	5–0	2–2	2–1	

Source: Soccerway.com
Legend: Blue = home team win; Yellow = draw; Red = away team win.

=== Top goalscorers ===
Rank	Player	Player nationality	Club	Goals
1	Carlos Saucedo	Bolivian	San José	17
2	Gualberto Mojica	Bolivian	Oriente Petrolero	13
3	Pablo Escobar	Bolivian	The Strongest	11
4	Alcides Peña	Bolivian	Oriente Petrolero	10

== Relegation ==
Pos	Team	2011 Pts	2011–12 Pts	2011–12 Pts	Total Pts	Total Pld	Avg	Relegation
1	Oriente Petrolero	36	23	38	97	56	1.732	
2	Aurora	33	24	34	91	56	1.625	
3	Real Potosí	38	17	35	90	56	1.607	
4	San José	34	18	38	90	56	1.607	
5	The Strongest	35	15	38	88	56	1.571	
6	Bolívar	40	19	28	87	56	1.554	
7	Universitario de Sucre	29	19	37	85	56	1.518	
8	Blooming	35	10	37	82	56	1.464	
9	Nacional Potosí	28	16	34	78	56	1.393	
10	Guabirá	29	19	8	56	56	1	Relegation Playoff Match
11	La Paz	17	14	24	55	56	0.982	Relegation Playoff Match
12	Real Mamoré	20	6	18	44	56	0.786	Relegation to the Liga Nacional B

=== Relegation/promotion playoff ===
Team #1	Points	Team #2	1st leg	2nd leg	Playoff
Guabirá	3:6	Jorge Wilstermann	2–0	0–2	0–1
La Paz	6:3	Destroyers	6–1	1–3	1–0
