= Saidt Mustafá =

Bolivian footballer (born 1989)

Personal information
- Full name: Saidt Mustafá Céspedes
- Date of birth: 26 November 1989 (age 36)
- Place of birth: Santa Cruz de la Sierra, Bolivia
- Height: 1.87 m (6 ft 2 in)
- Position: Goalkeeper

Team information
- Current team: GV San José
- Number: 1

Senior career*
Years	Team	Apps	(Gls)
2011–2013	Real Santa Cruz		
2013–2018	Sport Boys Warnes	79	(0)
2019	Bolívar	26	(0)
2020—2021	Guabirá	46	(0)
2022–2025	Nacional Potosí	139	(0)
2026-	GV San José	6	(0)

International career^{‡}
2019–	Bolivia	1	(0)
- * Club domestic league appearances and goals as of 00:39, 28 December 2025 (UTC) ‡ National team caps and goals as of 31 March 2019

Saidt Mustafá Céspedes (born 26 November 1989) is a Bolivian professional footballer who plays for GV San José as a goalkeeper.

== International career ==
Born in Bolivia, Mustafá is of Palestinian descent. On 3 March 2019 Mustafá made his debut for the Bolivia national football team against Nicaragua.
