= Mauro Bustamante =

Argentine footballer

Personal information
- Full name: Mauro Sergio Bustamante
- Date of birth: 23 June 1991 (age 35)
- Place of birth: Santa Fe, Argentina
- Height: 1.83 m (6 ft 0 in)
- Position: Forward

Team information
- Current team: Juventud Antoniana

Youth career
- 2008–2010: Colón

Senior career*
Years	Team	Apps	(Gls)
2011	Deportes Naval	4	(0)
2012	Rocafuerte	17	(5)
2013–2014	Municipal Cañar	35	(16)
2014–2015	San José	34	(14)
2015	Aucas	14	(1)
2016	Deportivo Pereira	4	(2)
2016	LDU Portoviejo		(10)
2017	Alianza Petrolera	6	(1)
2017	LDU Portoviejo		(9)
2018	Orense	19	(8)
2018	Guayaquil City	8	(0)
2019	Mineros de Guayana	1	(0)
2020	Nacional Potosí	5	(2)
2021	Vida	2	(0)
2021	Cerro	1	(0)
2022	Sport Chavelines Juniors	7	(1)
2024–	Juventud Antoniana	10	(0)
- * Club domestic league appearances and goals as of 16 December 2024

Mauro Sergio Bustamante (born 23 June 1991) is an Argentine professional footballer who plays as a forward for Juventud Antoniana.
