= Carlos Castilla =

Argentine footballer (born 1979)

Personal information
- Full name: Carlos Federico Castilla Miguel
- Date of birth: December 26, 1979 (age 46)
- Place of birth: General San Martín, Argentina
- Height: 1.87 m (6 ft 2 in)
- Position: Striker

Team information
- Current team: Camioneros Argentinos

Senior career*
Years	Team	Apps	(Gls)
1996–1998	Gimnasia y Tiro de Salta	33	(4)
1998–1999	Independiente	2	(0)
1999–2000	San Lorenzo	1	(0)
2001	Deportes Concepción	12	(7)
2001	San Lorenzo	0	(0)
2002	Huachipato	13	(3)
2002–2003	Instituto de Córdoba	8	(2)
2003–2004	Gimnasia de Jujuy	28	(7)
2004–2005	San Martín (SJ)	26	(5)
2005–2006	Juventud Antoniana	31	(6)
2006–2007	San Martín (T)	12	(2)
2007–2008	Ferro Carril Oeste	8	(0)
2008–2009	Universitario de Sucre	18	(8)
2009	Blooming	15	(1)
2009–2010	Manta FC	10	(3)
2010–2011	Deportes Antofagasta	10	(1)
2011	Atlético Audaz		
2011–2012	Universitario de Sucre	10	(2)
2012–2013	Textil Mandiyú		
2013–2014	Gimnasia y Esgrima	15	(0)
2014	Textil Mandiyú		
2014–	Camioneros Argentinos		
- * Club domestic league appearances and goals as of 30 March 2015

Carlos Federico Castilla Miguel (Note: In this Spanish name, the first or paternal surname is Castilla and the second or maternal family name is Miguel.) (born December 26, 1979, in General San Martín, Salta Province) is an Argentine football striker currently playing for Camioneros Argentinos.

== Club career ==
Castilla has an extensive career in football. He began professionally at Gimnasia y Tiro de Salta. Later, he played for important clubs such as Club Atlético Independiente and San Lorenzo de Almagro in Argentina. Castilla also spent some years playing in the Chilean first division for Deportes Concepción and Huachipato. In 2008 and after some years playing in the Argentine second division, he signed with Bolivian side Universitario de Sucre. That same year the team won the Apertura and Castilla was a great contributor in achieving that. His good form rewarded him with a transfer to Blooming in early 2009, but he did not live up to the expectations and was released during the winter break. In July 2009, he relocated to Ecuador and joined Manta Fútbol Club. The following year Castilla returned to Chile and signed for second division side Deportes Antofagasta. In 2011 Castilla joined Universitario for his second stint, but left the club in February 2012. Textil Mandiyú became his next club not long after.

== Club titles ==
Season	Club	Title
1997	Gimnasia y Tiro	Torneo Argentino B
2008 (A)	Universitario	Liga de Fútbol Profesional Boliviano
