= Nelvin Solíz =

Bolivian footballer (born 1989)

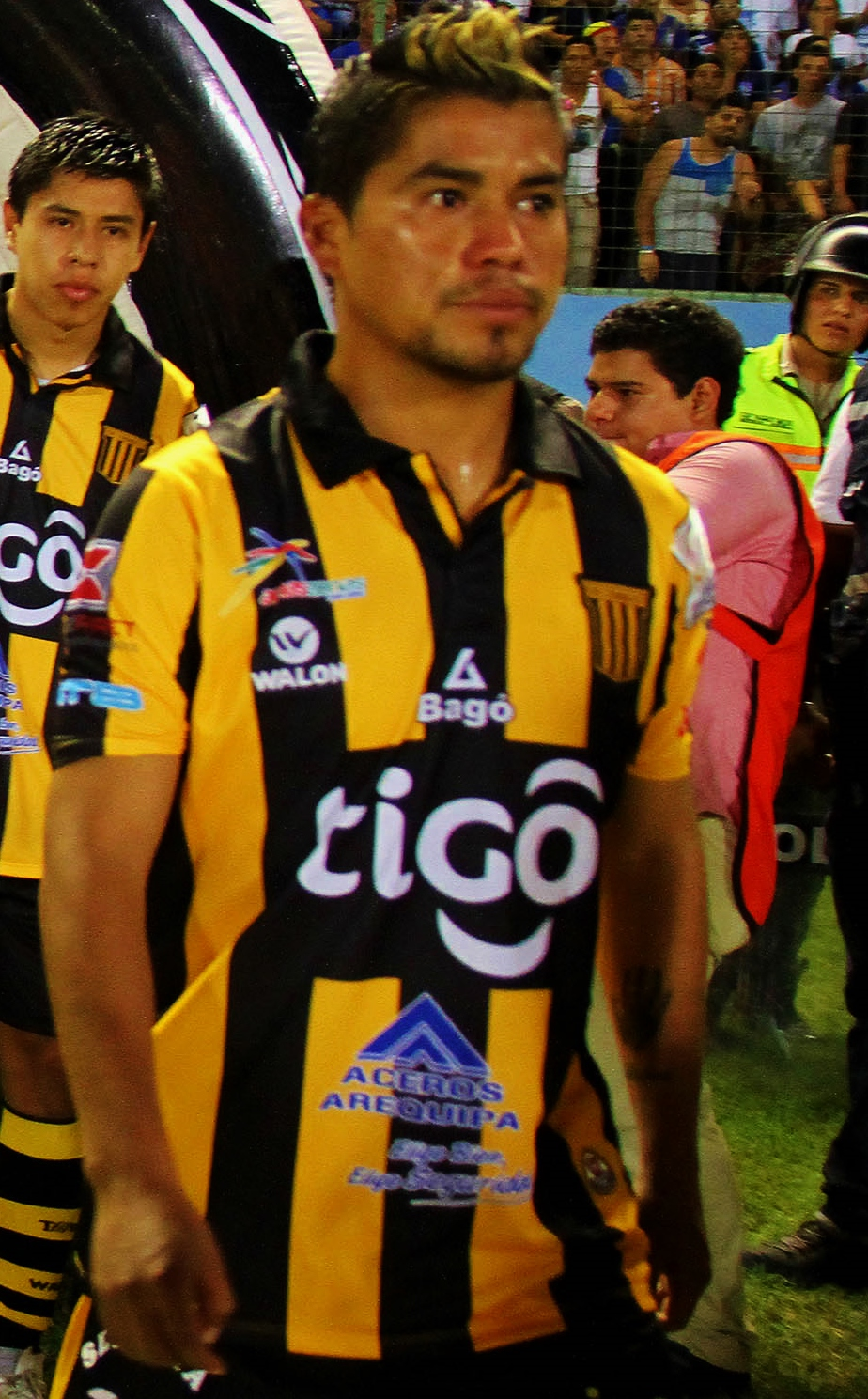

Personal information
- Full name: Nelvin Solíz Escalante
- Date of birth: November 3, 1989 (age 37)
- Place of birth: Cercado, Bolivia
- Height: 1.60 m (5 ft 3 in)
- Position: Winger

Youth career
- 2000–2006: The Strongest

Senior career*
Years	Team	Apps	(Gls)
2006–2015	The Strongest	234	(29)
2015–2016	Ciclón	36	(7)
2016–2017	The Strongest	13	(2)
2018–2019	Nacional Potosí	40	(4)
- * Club domestic league appearances and goals

Nelvin Solíz Escalante (born November 3, 1989), nicknamed Masita, is a Bolivia former football (soccer) midfielder.
