= Liga Nacional B =

- Founded: 2011
- Folded: 2016
- Number of clubs: 20
- Level on pyramid: 2
- Promotion to: Liga de Fútbol Profesional Boliviano
- Last champions: Guabirá (2015–16 Liga Nacional B)
- Most championships: Guabirá (4 title)
- Website: Official Site

The Liga Nacional B was the second tier of the Bolivian Football pyramid between 2011 and 2016. The inaugural season was scheduled to last from August 6, 2011 until April 8, 2012. In 2012–13 comprised the champions of the nine Bolivian Regional Leagues, two relegated teams from Liga Nacional A, the champions of Torneo Nacional Interprovincial and the top three of Copa Bolivia. The winners were promoted to the Liga Nacional A, while the second placed will compete a promotion/relegation playoff with the 13th placed from Liga Nacional A.

Teams had to use at least one U-19 player throughout any match; likewise, the number of non-Bolivian players was limited to a maximum of four players at any given point of a match.

== List of champions ==
Ed.	Season	Champion	Runner-up	Third Place
1	2011–12	Petrolero	Destroyers	Jorge Wilstermann
2	2012–13	Guabirá	Sport Boys	Ciclón
3	2013–14	Universitario de Pando	Petrolero	García Agreda
4	2014–15	Ciclón	Atlético Bermejo	Guabirá
5	2015–16	Guabirá	Universitario del Beni	Empresa Minera Huanuni; Universitario de Tarija

== Titles by club ==
Club	Titles	Seasons won
Guabirá	2	2012–13, 2015–16
Ciclón	1	2014–15
Petrolero	1	2011–12
Universitario de Pando	1	2013–14
