= Club Petrolero =

Bolivian football club

Petrolero
- Full name: Club Atletico Petrolero del Gran Chaco
- Nickname(s): Petrolero de Yacuiba, Surazo Verde
- Founded: 4 September 2000; 24 years ago
- Ground: Estadio Ovidio Messa Soruco Yacuiba, Bolivia
- Capacity: 25,000
- Chairman: Federico Ibarra Olarte
- Manager: Daniel Sagman
- League: Copa Simón Bolívar; Primera A AMFY
- 2023: Primera A AMFY, 2nd of 6
| Home colors | Away colors |

Club Petrolero is a Bolivian football club from Yacuiba that currently plays in the Liga de Fútbol Profesional Boliviano. Their home ground is Estadio Provincial de Yacuiba.

== Honours ==
=== National ===
- Liga Nacional B
  - Champions (1): 2011–12
  - Runners-up (1): 2013–14

=== Regional ===
- Asociación Tarijeña de Fútbol
  - Champions (2): 2008, 2011
  - Runners-up (1): 2009
