= Sport Boys Warnes =

Bolivian football club

Sport Boys
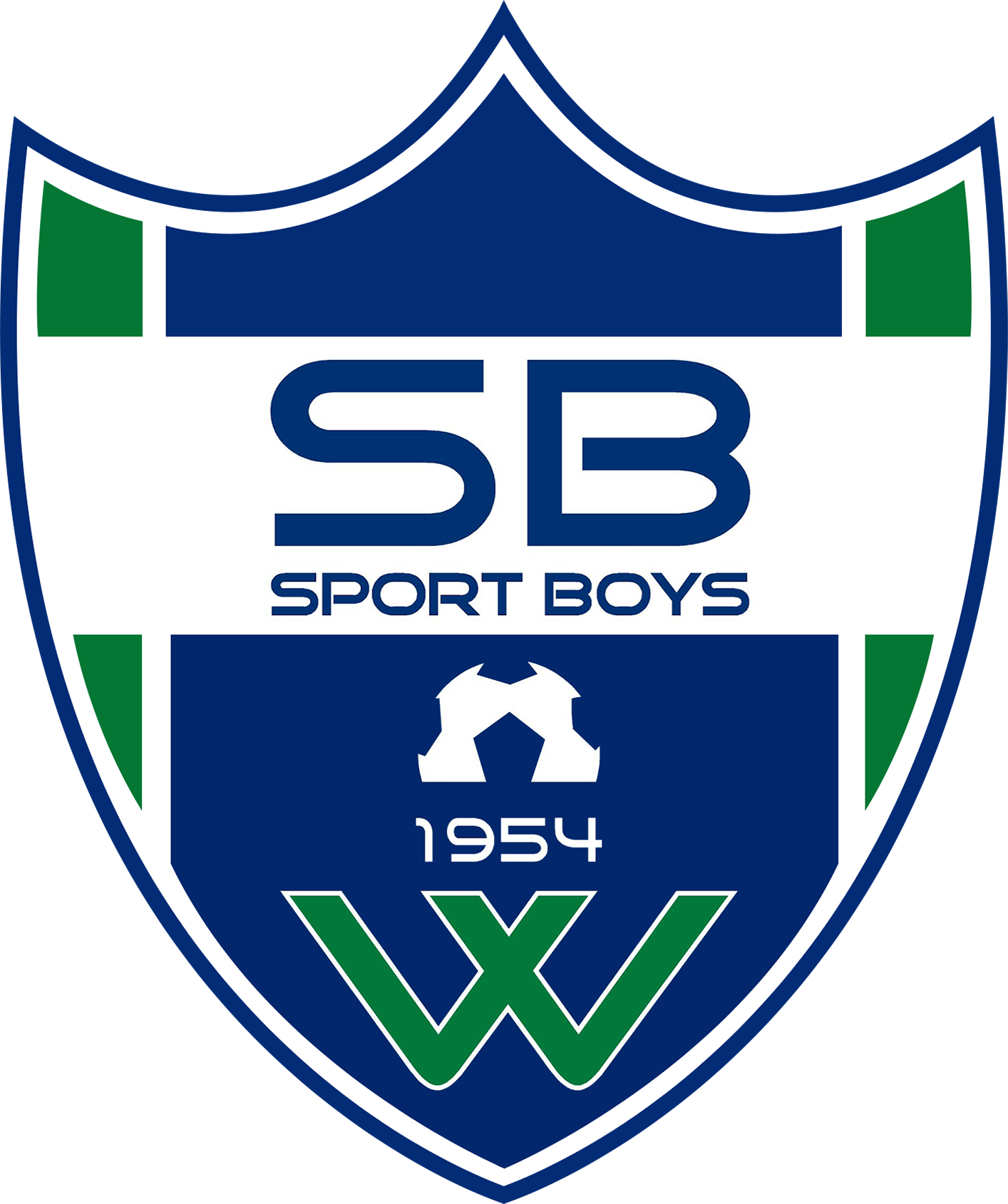
- Full name: Sport Boys Warnes
- Nickname: El Toro Warneño
- Founded: 17 August 1954; 71 years ago
- Dissolved: 2019; 7 years ago
- Ground: Estadio Samuel Vaca Jiménez
- Capacity: 9,000
- Chairman: Carlos Romero
- Manager: Mauro Blanco
- League: Bolivian Football Regional Leagues
- 2019 Clausura: División Profesional, 14th (disaffiliated)
Home colours	Away colours	Third colours

Club Sport Boys Warnes was a Bolivian professional football team based in Warnes, Santa Cruz de la Sierra, that competes in the Bolivian Primera División.

== History ==
The club was founded on 17 August 1954. The club reached in 2013 second place of the Liga Nacional B and was for the first time in its history promoted to the Bolivian Primera División. Warnes signed to the beginning of 2014 the former Argentine footballer Néstor Clausen as new coach. The club ranks 2014 three internationals for the Bolivia national football team with goalkeeper Sergio Galarza, defender Carlos Mendoza and Joaquín Botero.

In 2014, sitting Bolivian president Evo Morales signed a contract for 200 dollars a month with Sports Boys Warnes, becoming the oldest active professional soccer player in the world.

== Current squad ==
As of 3 May 2018 Note: Flags indicate national team as defined under FIFA eligibility rules; some limited exceptions apply. Players may hold more than one non-FIFA nationality.

No.	Pos.	Nation	Player
1	GK	BOL	Saidt Mustafá
2	DF	BOL	Jordy Candia
3	DF	PAR	Óscar Velázquez
5	DF	BOL	Jesús Flores
7	FW	ARG	Imanol Iriberri
8	MF	ARG	Luciano Ursino
10	MF	ESP	José Luis Capdevila
11	MF	BOL	Edivaldo Rojas
17	MF	BOL	Jorge Rojas
18	MF	BOL	Mauricio Saucedo
21	MF	BOL	Guery García

No.	Pos.	Nation	Player
22	MF	BRA	Ferreira
23	GK	BOL	Miguel Mercado
25	MF	BOL	Damir Miranda
27	FW	ESP	Armiche
28	DF	BOL	Óscar Ribera (on loan from Bolívar)
29	FW	COL	Yoni Angulo
—	FW	BOL	Carmelo Algarañaz (on loan from Oriente Petrolero)
—	DF	BOL	Julio Pérez
—	MF	BOL	Olvis Justiniano
—	DF	BOL	Juan Rivero
—	GK	BOL	Fabián Rojas

== Notable managers ==
- (Bolivia) Hilda Ordóñez (2013)
- (Argentina) Néstor Clausen (2014)
- (Bolivia) Víctor Hugo Antelo (2014)
- (Paraguay) Celso Ayala (2015)
- (Bolivia) Víctor Hugo Antelo (2015)
- (Argentina) Carlos Fabián Leeb (2015–2016)
- (Bolivia) Sergio Apaza (2016)
- (Bolivia) Eduardo Villegas (2016)
- (Spain) Xabier Azkargorta (2016–2017)
- (Paraguay) Pablo Caballero Cáceres (2017)
- (Bolivia) Sergio Apaza (2017)
- (Bolivia) Marcos Ferrufino (2017–2018)
- (Argentina) César Vigevani (2018)
- (Argentina) Carlos Fabián Leeb (2019)
- (Argentina) Christian Lovrincevich (2019)
- (Bolivia) Víctor Hugo Antelo (2019)
- (Bolivia) Mauro Blanco (2019–2020)

== Honours ==
=== National ===
- Bolivian Primera División
  - Winners (1): 2015-A
