= Warnes, Bolivia =

Town in Bolivia

Warnes
- Town
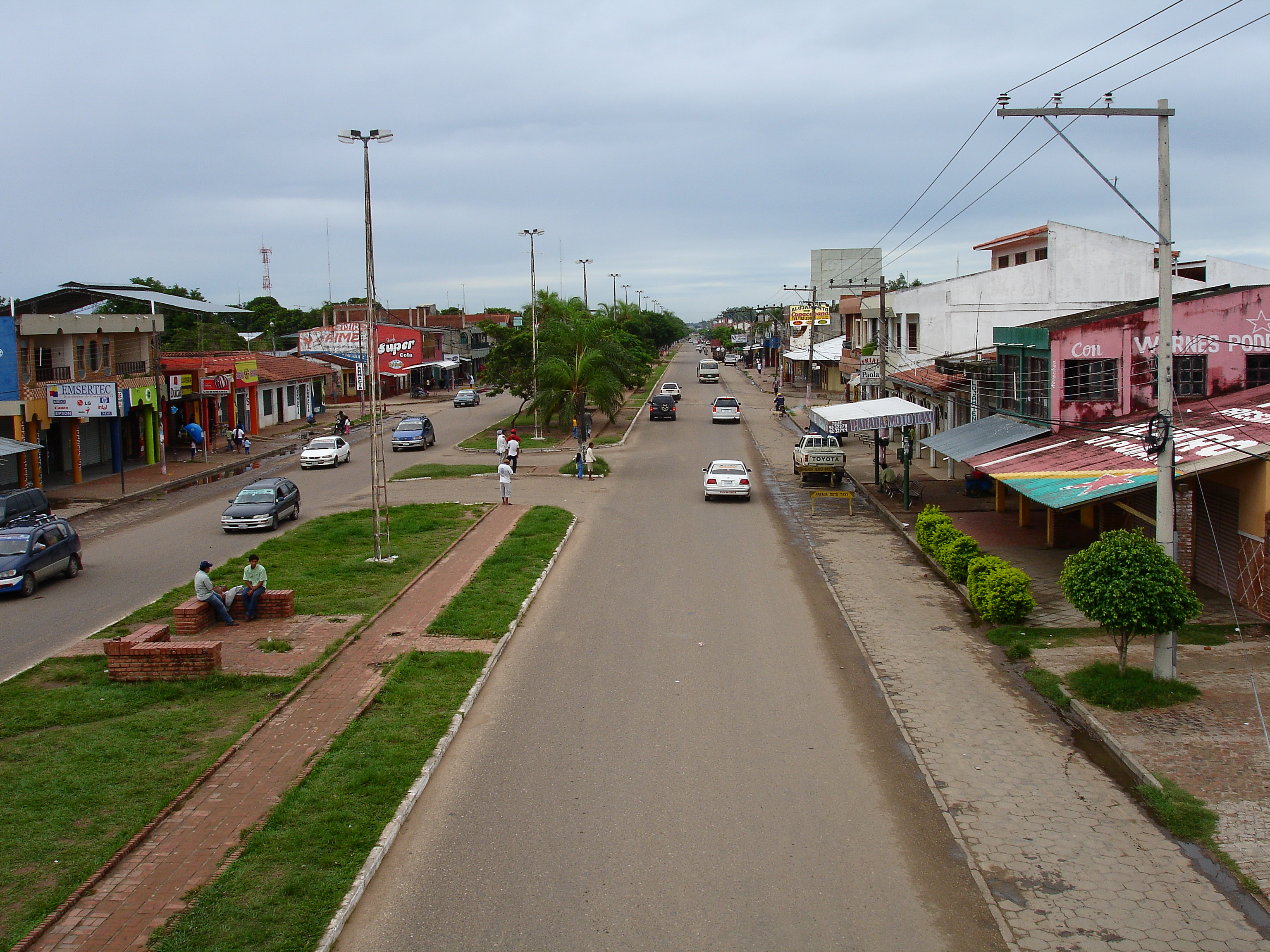

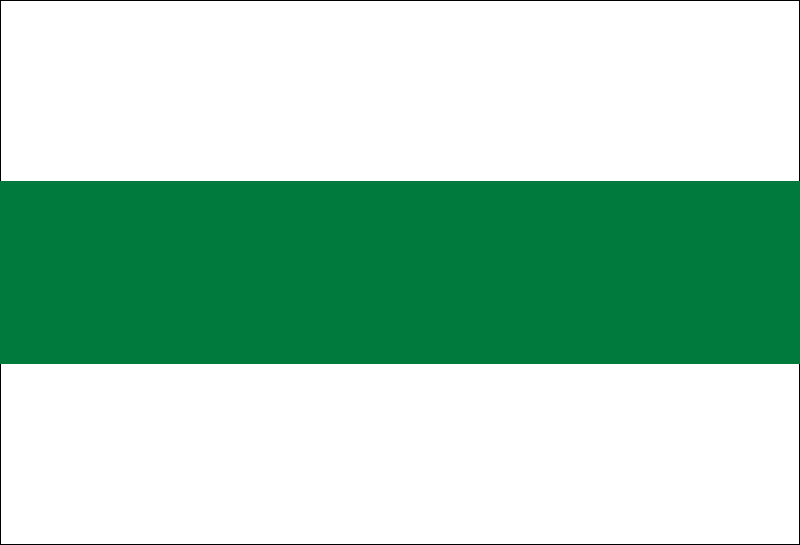
- Flag

- Location within Bolivia
- Coordinates: 17°31′S 63°10′W
- Country: Bolivia
- Department: Santa Cruz Department
- Province: Ignacio Warnes Province
- Municipality: Warnes Municipality

Government
  - Mayor: Nyls Ottoniel Carmona (2008)
  - President: Samuel Vaca Franco (2008)
- Elevation: 339 m (1,112 ft)

Population (2012)
  - Total: 30,964
- Time zone: UTC-4 (BOT)
- Area code: +591 3923
- Climate: Aw

Warnes is a town in Bolivia, named after Colonel Ignacio Warnes, a military leader in the South American war of independence. It is located 24 kilometers north of Santa Cruz de la Sierra.
