= 2010 Oriente Petrolero season =

Association football season

Oriente Petrolero
2010 season
- Chairman: (Bolivia) Miguel Ángel Antelo
- Manager: (Argentina) Gustavo Quinteros
- Copa Aerosur: Play-off round
- Cuadrangular Internacional del Peru: Winners
- 2010 Apertura: 2nd
- Torneo Invierno: Winners
- Copa Sudamericana: 2nd Stage
- Campeonato Clausura: 1st
- Top goalscorer: League: (Bolivia) Mauricio Saucedo (7 goals); All: (Bolivia) Alcides Peña (14 goals)
- Highest home attendance: 37,500 v (Bolivia) Blooming (28 March)
- Lowest home attendance: 7,000 v (Bolivia) Real Mamoré (26 July)

The 2010 season is Oriente Petrolero's 54th competitive season, 34th consecutive season in the Liga de Fútbol Profesional Boliviano, and 55th year in existence as a football club. To see more news about Oriente go to Oriente Petrolero Site Official.

== First team squad ==
As of 25 November 2010.

Note: Flags indicate national team as defined under FIFA eligibility rules; some limited exceptions apply. Players may hold more than one non-FIFA nationality.

No.	Pos.	Nation	Player
1	GK	BOL	Hugo Suarez
2	DF	BOL	Miguel Hoyos
3	DF	BOL	Lorgio Suarez
4	MF	PAR	Francisco Argüello
5	DF	ARG	Alejandro Schiapparelli
6	DF	ARG	Gustavo Caamaño
8	MF	BOL	Nicolas Suarez
9	FW	URU	Danilo Peinado
10	MF	BOL	Jhasmani Campos
11	FW	BOL	Alcides Peña

No.	Pos.	Nation	Player
13	MF	BOL	Diego Terrazas
14	DF	BOL	Gabriel Aguilar
15	DF	BOL	Ronald Rea
16	GK	BOL	José Carlo Fernández
17	FW	URU	Jorge Ramírez
18	FW	BOL	Mauricio Saucedo
19	DF	BOL	Ariel Ribera
21	MF	BOL	Joselito Vaca
23	DF	BOL	Luis Alberto Gutierrez
26	MF	BOL	Fernando Saucedo

=== Reserves Squad ===
As of 10 November.

Note: Flags indicate national team as defined under FIFA eligibility rules; some limited exceptions apply. Players may hold more than one non-FIFA nationality.

No.	Pos.	Nation	Player
—	GK	BOL	Óscar Antelo
—	GK	BOL	Alex Arancibia
—	DF	BOL	Pedro Canella
—	DF	BOL	Naun Rodríguez
—	MF	BOL	Jorge Toco
—	FW	BRA	Lincoln Martins
—	MF	BOL	Carlos Melgar
—	DF	BOL	Carlos Arriel

No.	Pos.	Nation	Player
—	FW	BOL	Pedro López
—	MF	BOL	Ronny Montero
—	MF	BOL	Carlos Melgar
—	FW	BOL	Jhasmani Duck
—	MF	BOL	Brolin Jordán
—	GK	BOL	Oscar Antelo
—	DF	BOL	Jose Suarez
—	FW	BOL	Robert Heguigorri

=== In ===
==== Pre-season ====
Num	Pos	Player	From	Fee	Date
22	GK	(Argentina) Ramiro Fassi	(Argentina) Rosario Central	Free	24 December 2009
23	FW	(Argentina) Alejandro Schiapparelli	(Bolivia) Bolivar	Free	28 December 2009
18	MF	(Paraguay) Gilberto Palacios	(Chile) Universidad Católica	Free	4 January 2010
24	MF	(Brazil) Abraão Lincoln	(Japan) Shonan Bellmare	Free	18 January 2010
24	MF	(Bolivia) Hugo Suárez	(Bolivia) Wilstermann	Free	18 January 2010
24	MF	(Bolivia) Miguel Hoyos	(Bolivia) Bolivar	Free	7 March 2010

=== Season ===
Num	Pos	Player	From	Fee	Date
17	FW	(Uruguay) Jorge Ramírez	(Uruguay) Central Español	Free	24 March 2010
TBA	GK	(Bolivia) José Carlos Fernández	(Venezuela) Deportivo Italia		30 June 2010
TBA	DF	(Argentina) Gustavo Caamaño	(Argentina) CIA		6 July 2010
TBA	FW	(Uruguay) Danilo Peinado	(Paraguay) Olimpia		28 July

=== Loaned out ===
Num	Pos	Player	To	Start	End
	DF	(Bolivia) Ronald Rea	(Bolivia) Guabirá	11 January 2010	21 December 2010
	MF	(Bolivia) Andrés Jiménez	(Bolivia) Guabirá	11 January 2010	21 January 2010
	FW	(Bolivia) Sebastian Molina	(Brazil) Esporte Clube Bahia	4 March 2010	5 March 2014
71	FW	(Bolivia) Juan Carlos Arce	(Russia) FC Terek Grozny	15 March 2010	26 December 2010
27	FW	(Bolivia) Pablo Salinas	(Colombia) Deportes Quindío	20 July 2010	December 2010
7	MF	(Argentina) Marcelo Aguirre	(Argentina) Rosario Central	August 2011	December 2010

=== Pre-season ===
2010-07-02
20:00

Guabirá	0–0	Oriente Petrolero

Estadio Gilberto Parada, Montero
Attendance: 18,289
Referee: Ivan Gamboa

=== Start formations ===
Qnt	Formation	Match(es)
22	4–4–2	1–2 Apertura, 1–2 Clausura
29	3–4–3	Copa Aerosur
22	3–4–3	Copa Sudamericana

Last updated: 25 April
Source: Match reports in Competitive matches
Only competitive matches.

=== Starting 11 ===
These charts below depict the eleven players that started the most Oriente Petrolero games in the entire 2010 season in the most used starting formation (currently 4–4–2).

No.	Pos.	Nat.	Name	MS	Notes
16	GK	(Bolivia)	Fernández	38	
2	DF	(Bolivia)	Miguel Hoyos	33	
6	DF	(Argentina)	Gustavo Caamaño	28	
5	DF	(Argentina)	Schiapparelli	47	
23	LB	(Bolivia)	Gutierrez	27	
8	DM	(Bolivia)	Suarez	30	
26	MF	(Bolivia)	Saucedo	44	
10	MF	(Bolivia)	Campos	36	
21	MF	(Bolivia)	Vaca	36	
9	FW	(Uruguay)	Peinado	36	
11	FW	(Bolivia)	Peña	32	

Last updated: 25 November
Source: Squad stats and Start formations.
Only competitive matches.
Using the most used start formation.
Ordered by position on pitch (from back right to front left).

=== Top scorers ===
Includes all competitive matches. The list is sorted by shirt number when total goals are equal.

Last updated on 30 September

Position	Nation	Number	Name	Apertura	Torneo Invierno	Clausura	Copa Sudamericana	Copa Aerosur	Total
1	(Bolivia)	11	Alcides Peña	3	6	5	0	0	14
2	(Uruguay)	17	Jorge Ramírez	9	1	1	0	0	11
3	(Argentina)	7	Marcelo Aguirre	7	2	0	0	1	10
6	(Bolivia)	18	Mauricio Saucedo	0	0	7	2	0	9
5	(Bolivia)	10	Jhasmani Campos	2	1	5	0	0	8
5	(Bolivia)	21	Joselito Vaca	3	2	2	0	0	7
8	(Uruguay)	9	Danilo Peinado	0	0	6	1	0	7
4	(Bolivia)	27	Pablo Salinas	4	2	0	0	0	6
5	(Bolivia)	2	Miguel Hoyos	2	1	2	0	0	5
7	(Bolivia)	18	Fernando Saucedo	0	1	3	0	0	4
8	(Argentina)	5	Alejandro Schiapparelli	2	0	1	0	0	3
8	(Bolivia)	13	Diego Terrazas	1	0	1	0	0	2
9	(Bolivia)		Rover Heguigorric	0	0	2	0	0	2
9	(Bolivia)	15	Ronald Rea	0	0	0	1	0	1
9	(Bolivia)		Luis Hernán Melgar	0	0	1	0	0	1
9	(Bolivia)		Pablo Rojas	0	0	1	0	0	1
9	(Bolivia)	23	Luis Alberto Gutierrez	0	0	1	0	0	1
9	(Bolivia)	1	Hugo Suarez	1	0	0	0	0	1
			TOTALS	39	16	38	4	1	98

- Note that Pablos Salinas is currently on loan at Deportes Quindío and Marcelo Aguirre at Rosario Central, and Gilberto Palacios is not on the leaderboard, because he left the club and players who left the club.

== Competitions ==
=== Overall ===
Competition	Started round	Current Position/Round	Final position/Round	First match	Last match
Copa Aerosur & del Sur 2010	Qualifying Round	—	Play-off Round	5 Jan	24 Jan
Cuadrangular Internacional del Peru	Group Stage	–	Winners	1 Feb	15 Feb
Apertura	Group Stage	2nd (Winner's Group)	2nd	2 March	9 Jun
Torneo Invierno	First Stage	Final	Winners	16 Jun	21 Jul
Clausura	Group Stage	2nd	—	—	
Copa Sudamericana	First Stage	Second Stage	Second Stage	24 Sep	21 Sep

Updated to match played 10 April
Source: Competitions

== Copa Aerosur ==
Team 1	Agg.	Team 2	1st leg	2nd leg
Jorge Wilstermann	3–1	Oruro Royal	2–0	1–1
Fraternidad Tigres	2–5	Blooming	0–3	2–2
Oriente Petrolero	4–2	Stormers San Lorenzo	2–0	2–2
Aurora	1–1(5–4 p)	Ciclón	1–0	0–1

=== Play-off round ===
Team 1	Agg.	Team 2	1st leg	2nd leg
Bolívar	3–2	The Strongest	2–1	1–1
Blooming	4–2	Oriente Petrolero	3–1	1–1
Jorge Wilstermann	4–1	Aurora	1–0	3–1

January 20
20:30

Blooming	3–1	Oriente Petrolero
Juan Carlos Sánchez 27'; Luís Sillero 31'; José Luis Chávez 49'	(Report)	Marcelo Aguirre 61'

Estadio Ramón Tahuichi Aguilera, Santa Cruz de la Sierra
Attendance: 35,000
Referee: Joaquín Antequera

January 24
19:00

Oriente Petrolero	1–1	Blooming
Juan Carlos Arce 29'	(Report)	Juan Carlos Sánchez 25'

Estadio Ramón Tahuichi Aguilera, Santa Cruz de la Sierra
Attendance: 36,000

==== Cuadrangular Internacional Del Peru ====
Pos	Team	Pld	W	PKW	PKL	L	GF	GA	GD	Pts
1	(Bolivia) Oriente Petrolero	3	3	0	0	0	6	3	+3	9
2	(Peru) Cienciano	3	2	0	0	1	5	4	+1	6
3	(Ecuador) Deportivo Cuenca	3	2	0	0	1	3	3	0	6
4	(Peru) Deportivo Garcilaso	3	0	0	0	3	2	6	−4	0

1 February 2010 15:00 (UTC-5)

Deportivo Garcilaso (Peru)	2–3	(Bolivia) Oriente Petrolero
Jose Paredez 20'; Lucho Baca 78'	(Report)	Alejandro Schiapparelli 32'; Joselito Vaca 40'; Gilberto Palacios 65'

Estadio Garcilaso de la Vega,
Cusco, Peru
Attendance: 28,000
Referee: Victor Serquera

5 February 2010 16:00 (UTC-5)

Oriente Petrolero (Bolivia)	2–1	(Ecuador) Deportivo Cuenca
Juan Carlos Arce 44'; Alcides Peña 37'		Luis Miguel Escalada 6'

Estadio Garcilaso de la Vega,
Cusco, Peru
Attendance: 31,100
Referee: Nestor Orrosco

15 February 2010 18:30 (UTC-5)

Oriente Petrolero (Bolivia)	1–0	(Peru) Cienciano
Joselito Vaca 34'	(Report)

Estadio Garcilaso de la Vega,
Cusco, Peru
Attendance: 21,203
Referee: Jose Manuel

==== Return to Bolivia ====
28 February 2010

Oriente Petrolero	0–0	Guabirá
	(Report)

Estadio Tahuichi Aguilera
Attendance: 1,500
Referee: Oscar Saucedo

== Torneo Apertura ==
=== Serie B ===
Pos	Team	Pld	W	D	L	GF	GA	GD	Pts	Qualification
1	Bolívar	12	9	1	2	23	11	+12	28	Advanced to the Winner's Hexagonal
2	Oriente Petrolero	12	7	1	4	21	10	+11	22	Advanced to the Winner's Hexagonal
3	Jorge Wilstermann	12	5	3	4	17	17	0	18	Advanced to the Winner's Hexagonal
4	Real Potosí	12	5	1	6	11	19	−8	16	Advanced to the Loser's Hexagonal
5	La Paz	12	4	2	6	19	19	0	14	Advanced to the Loser's Hexagonal
6	Real Mamoré	12	4	0	8	15	25	−10	12	Advanced to the Loser's Hexagonal

Updated to match(es) played on May 6, 2010. Source: RSSSF
Rules for classification: 1) points; 2) goal difference; 3) number of goals scored.

==== Results by round ====
Round	1	2	3	4	5	6	7	8	9	10	11	12
Ground	A	H	A	A	H	H	H	A	A	H	H	A
Result	W	W	L	L	W	W	W	D	L	W	W	L
Position	3	2	2	2	2	2	2	2	2	2	2	2

Updated to match(es) played on 13 April. Source: Matches
A = Away; H = Home; W = Win; D = Draw; L = Loss

==== Matches ====
7 March 2010
16:00

Real Mamoré	1–2	Oriente Petrolero
Juan Pablo Fernández (yellow card) 38'; Juan Maraude 36'; Porfirio Diez (yellow card) 66'; Ovidio Guatía (yellow card) 72'	(Report)	Miguel Hoyos 14'; Luis Gutiérrez (red card) 62'; Gilberto Palacios (yellow card) 44'; Ariel Ribera (yellow card) 60'; Marcelo Aguirre (yellow card) 62'; Diego Terrazas 74'

Estadio Gran Mamoré, Trinidad
Attendance: 13,000
Referee: Peter Guerrero
14 March 2010
18:00

Oriente Petrolero	3–0	Real Potosi
Gilberto Palacios (yellow card) 16' (goal) 60'; Marcelo Aguirre 44', 67'; Nicolas Suarez (yellow card) 45'; Lorgio Suarez (yellow card) 71'; Abraão Lincoln Martins (red card)	(Report)	Eduardo Ortiz (yellow card) 38'; José Luis Reyes (yellow card) 41'; Gerardo Yecerotte (yellow card) 42'

Estadio Tahuichi Aguilera, Santa Cruz
Attendance: 7,000
17 March 2010
18:00

La Paz F.C.	2–1	Oriente Petrolero
Diómedes Peña 85', 89'	(Report)	Gilberto Palacios 50'

Estadio Hernando Siles, La Paz
Attendance: 25,000
Referee: Oscar Maldonado
20 March 2010
16:00

Bolivar	1–0	Oriente Petrolero
William Ferreira 88'	(Report)

Estadio Hernando Siles, La Paz
Attendance: 25,000
Referee: Oscar Maldonado
28 March 2010
19:00

Oriente Petrolero	2–0	Blooming
Gilberto Palacios 44'; Miguel Hoyos 55'; Hugo Suarez (red card) 65'	(Report)	Wilder Zabala (yellow card) 70' (yellow-red card)

Estadio Tahuichi Aguilera, Santa Cruz
Attendance: 37,500
31 March 2010
20:30

Oriente Petrolero	3–1	Jorge Wilstermann
Jorge Ramírez 35'; Nicolas Suarez (yellow card) 43' (yellow-red card); Marcelo Aguirre 49'; Alejandro Schiapparelli 59'	(Report)	Juan Ortiz 90'

Estadio Tahuichi Aguilera, Santa Cruz
Attendance: 25,000
11 April 2010
18:00

Oriente Petrolero	5–1	Real Mamoré
Jorge Ramírez 33', 73'; Gilberto Palacios 37'; Alcides Peña 63'; Jhasmani Campos 82'	(Report)	Juan Maraude 51'; Juan Pablo (red card) 22'

Estadio Tahuichi Aguilera, Santa Cruz
Attendance: 24,000
18 April 2010
16:00

Real Potosi	0–0	Oriente Petrolero
	(Report)

Estadio Victor Agustín Ugarte, Potosí
Attendance: 10,000
Referee: Hostin Prado
25 April 2010
19:00

Blooming	1–0	Oriente Petrolero
José Alfredo Castillo 33'	(Report)

Estadio Tahuichi Aguilera, Santa Cruz
Attendance: 33,000
Referee: Ivan Gamboa
29 April 2010
20:30

Oriente Petrolero	2–1	La Paz F.C.
Marcelo Aguirre (yellow card) 34'; Jorge Ramírez 41'; Joselito Vaca 72'; Lorgio Suarez (yellow card) 87'	(Report)	Felipe Cabanillas 75'

Estadio Tahuichi Aguilera, Santa Cruz
Attendance: 16,000
Referee: Jose Jordan
2 May 2010
18:00

Oriente Petrolero	3– 1	Bolivar
Marcelo Aguirre (yellow card) 25'; Jorge Ramírez 34', 57', 84'; Jhasmani Campos (yellow card) 50'; Alejandro Schiapparelli (yellow card) 61'	(Report)	Anderson Gonzaga 22'

Estadio Tahuichi Aguilera, Santa Cruz
Attendance: 20,000
Referee: Hostin Prado
5 May 2010
20:00

Jorge Wilstermann	1–0	Oriente Petrolero
Maximilliano Andrada 35'	(Report)

Estadio Felix Capriles, Cochabamba
Attendance: 25,000

==== Winner's Hexagonal ====
Pos	Team	Pld	W	D	L	GF	GA	GD	Pts	Qualification
1	Jorge Wilstermann	10	6	2	2	15	11	+4	20	2011 Copa Libertadores Second Stage
2	Oriente Petrolero	10	6	1	3	18	11	+7	19	
3	Aurora	10	4	2	4	19	18	+1	14	
4	The Strongest	10	3	4	3	15	14	+1	13	2011 Copa Sudamericana First Stage (Note: The Strongest qualified for the 2011 Copa Sudamericana, as Oriente Petrolero later qualified for the 2011 Copa Libertadores and Aurora also later qualified for the 2011 Copa Sudamericana through the Clausura.)
5	Bolívar	10	3	2	5	7	14	−7	11	
6	San José	10	1	3	6	13	24	−11	6	

Source: Soccer Way
Rules for classification: 1) points; 2) goal difference; 3) number of goals scored.

===== Results by round =====
Round	1	2	3	4	5	6	7	8	9	10	11	12
Ground	H	H	A	H	A	A	A	H	A	H		
Result	D	L	W	W	L	W	L	W	W	W		
Position	4	6	4	2	4	2	3	3	2	2		

Updated to match(es) played on 13 April. Source: Matches
A = Away; H = Home; W = Win; D = Draw; L = Loss
9 May 2010
18:00

Oriente Petrolero	1–1	Jorge Wilstermann
Alejandro Schiapparelli (yellow card) 23'; Lorgio Suarez (yellow card) 80'; Marcelo Aguirre (yellow card) 81'; Pablo Salinas 82'	(Report)	Daniel Vaca (yellow card) 44'; Fernando Sanjurjo (yellow card) 44'; Nicolás Raimondi 51'; Maximiliano Andrada (yellow card) 85'

Estadio Tahuichi Aguilera, Santa Cruz
Attendance: 20,000
Referee: José Jordán
14 May 2010
20:00

Oriente Petrolero	1–2	Aurora
Jorge Ramírez (yellow card) 14'; Pablo Salinas (yellow card) 34'; Marcelo Aguirre 45'; Alejandro Schiapparelli (yellow card) 65'; Francisco Argüello (yellow card) 76'; Ariel Ribera (yellow card) 90'	(Report)	Edward Mauro (yellow card) 27'; Jair Reynoso 38', 43'; Ronal Rodriguez (yellow card) 45'; Jaime Robles (yellow card) 78'

Estadio Tahuichi Aguilera, Santa Cruz
Attendance: 15,000
Referee: Alejandro Mancilla
16 May 2010
15:30

The Strongest	1–2	Oriente Petrolero
Santos Amador (yellow card) 29'; Martín Menacho (yellow card) 85'; Federico Santiago (yellow card) 90'; Javier Lopez 67'	(Report)	Lorgio Suárez (yellow card) 45'; Francisco Argüello (yellow card) 71'; Hugo Suarez 76'; Ariel Ribera (yellow card) 79'; Joselito Vaca 90'

Estadio Hernando Siles, La Paz
Attendance: 5,800
Referee: Jose Jordan
20 May 2010
20:30

Oriente Petrolero	4–0	San Jose
Alejandro Schiapparelli (yellow card) 17'; Eduardo Melgar 22'; Nicolas Suarez (yellow card) 40'; Marcelo Aguirre 44', 73'; Luis Gutierrez (yellow card) 63'; Pablo Salinas 81'	(Report)	Emerson Felipao (yellow card) 36'; Alan Loras (yellow card) 37'; Jorge Daniel Bruno (yellow card) 44'; Franklin Juan Herrera (red card); Pedro Higa (yellow card) 47'

Estadio Tahuichi Aguilera, Santa Cruz
Referee: Raul Orozco
23 May 2010
15:30

Bolivar	2–1	Oriente Petrolero
Leonel Reyes (red card) 25'; Enrique Parada 29'; William Ferreira 54'	(Report)	Ronny Montero (yellow card) 36'; Lorgio Suárez (yellow card) 17'; Nicolas Suarez (yellow card) 18'; Marcelo Aguirre (red card) 58'; Luis Gutierrez (yellow card) 59'; Jhasmany Campos (yellow card) 83'; Joselito Vaca 64'

Estadio Hernando Siles, La Paz
Attendance: 5,000
Referee: Ivan Gamboa
26 May 2010
20:00

Jorge Wilstermann	1–3	Oriente Petrolero
Nicolás Raimondi 21'; Edgar Olivares (yellow card) 64'; Juan Daniel Salaberry (yellow card) 76'; Miguel Ortiz (yellow card) 84'; Maximiliano Andrada (yellow card) 84'	(Report)	Alcides Peña 5'; Lorgio Suárez (yellow card) 34'; Alejandro Schiapparelli 76'; Eduardo Melgar (yellow card) 84'; Jhasmany Campos (red card) 87'; Pablo Salinas 90'

Estadio Felix Capriles, Cochabamba
Attendance: 20,000
Referee: José Jordán
30 May 2010
17:15

Aurora	2–1	Oriente Petrolero
Marcelo Gomez 16'; Jaime Robles (yellow card) 27'; Ivan Huayhuata (yellow card) 33'; Marcelo Gomez (yellow card) 38'; Jair Reynoso 83'	(Report)	Jorge Ramírez 93'; Alcides Peña (red card) 74'; Francisco Arguello (yellow card) 52'; Ariel Ribera (yellow card) 84'

Estadio Felix Capriles, Cochabamba
Attendance: 27,000
Referee: Alejandro Mancilla
2 June 2010
20:30

Oriente Petrolero	2–1	The Strongest
Nicolas Suarez (yellow card) 37'; Pablo Salinas (yellow card) 54'; Miguel Hoyos< (yellow card) 55'; Luis Alberto Gutierrez (yellow card) 64'; Jorge Ramírez (yellow card) 72'; Jorge Ramírez 88'; Pablo Salinas 92'	(Report) or (Report)	Luís Palacios (yellow card) 18'; Julián Di Cosmo (yellow card) 41'; Javier López 58'; Federico García (yellow card) 74'; Rosauro Rivero (yellow card) 77'; Luis Gatty Ribeiro (yellow card) 79'; Jorge Antonio Ortiz (yellow card) 90'

Estadio Tahuichi Aguilera, Santa Cruz
Referee: Ivan Gamboa
6 June 2010
15:15

San Jose	0–1	Oriente Petrolero
Damir Miranda (yellow card) 27'; Alan Loras (yellow card) 75'	(Report)	Francisco Arguello (yellow card) 25'; Marcelo Aguirre 55'; Ariel Ribera (red card) 90'; Diego Terrazas (yellow card) 84'; Joselito Vaca (yellow card) 89'

Estadio Jesús Bermúdez, Oruro, Bolivia
Referee: Peter Guerrero
9 June 2010
20:00

Oriente Petrolero	2–0	Bolivar
Alcides Peña 9'; Alcides Peña (yellow card) 9'; Francisco Arguello (yellow card) 32'; Luis Gutierrez (yellow card) 53'; Jhasmani Campos 61'; Lorgio Suárez (yellow card) 78'	(Report) or (Report)	Didi Torrico (yellow card) 23'; Ronald Rivero (yellow card) 27'; Charles Da Silva (yellow card) 66'

Estadio Tahuichi Aguilera, Santa Cruz
Referee: José Jordán

== Torneo Invierno ==
=== First stage ===
Teams			Scores		Tie-breakers		
Team #1	Points	Team #2	1st leg	2nd leg	GD	AG	Pen.
Real Potosí	3:3	Universitario	3–0	0–2	+1:−1	—	—
Blooming	3:3	Oriente Petrolero	1–2	1–0	0:0	1:2	—
Guabirá	3:3	Real Mamoré	0–2	1–0	−1:+1	—	—
San José	4:1	La Paz	3–3	4–1	—	—	—
Jorge Wilstermann	4:1	Aurora	3–0	1–1	—	—	—
Bolívar	3:3	The Strongest	2–0	0–2	0:0	0:0	4–3

16 June 2010
20:45

Blooming	1–2	Oriente Petrolero
Fabricio Brandao (yellow card) 9'; David Villalba (yellow card) 38'; Lorgio Alvarez (red card); Sergio Jáuregui (yellow card) 61'; Omar Jesús Morales (yellow card) 64'; Gualberto Mojica 37'; Alejandro Gómez (yellow card) 88'	(Report)	Alcides Peña 35'; Lorgio Suarez (yellow card) 35'; Jorge Ramírez (yellow card) 42' (goal) 51'; Jhasmani Campos (yellow card) 62'; Francisco Arguello (yellow card) 85'

Estadio Tahuichi Aguilera, Santa Cruz de la Sierra
Attendance: 5,000
Referee: Oscar Maldonado

20 June 2010
19:15

Oriente Petrolero	0–1	Blooming
Lorgio Suarez (yellow card) 39'; Nicolas Suarez (yellow card) 57'; Joselito Vaca (yellow card) 57'; Miguel Hoyos (yellow card) 62'; Alejandro Schiapparelli (red card); Alcides Peña (yellow card) 79'	(Report)	José Alfredo Castillo 43'; Alejandro Gómez (yellow card) 7'; Gualberto Mojica (yellow card) 11'; Wilder Zabala (yellow card) 51'; José Luis Chávez (yellow card) 57'; Omar Jesús Morales (red card)

Estadio Tahuichi Aguilera, Santa Cruz de la Sierra
Attendance: 6,000
Referee: Peter Guerrero

=== Quarterfinals ===
Teams			Scores		Tie-breaker
Team #1	Points	Team #2	1st leg	2nd leg	Pen.
Real Mamoré	1:4	Oriente Petrolero	1–1	0–3	
San José	4:1	The Strongest	0–0	2–1	
Real Potosí	3:3	Bolívar	5–3	1–4	3–5
Jorge Wilstermann	3:3	Blooming	2–0	0–3	4–1

23 June 2010
20:00

Real Mamoré	1–1	Oriente Petrolero
Luis Reyes (yellow card) 22'; Juan Maraude (yellow card) 23'; Julio César Cortez 32'; Porfirio Diez (yellow card) 40'; Julio César Cortéz (yellow card) 79'	(Report)	Miguel Hoyos (yellow card) 34'; Alcides Peña (yellow card) 72'; Pablo Salinas 42'; Marcelo Aguirre (yellow card) 77'; Luis Alberto Gutierrez (yellow card) 80'

Estadio Gran Mamoré, Trinidad
Attendance: 3,000
Referee: Wilson Estrada

26 June 2010
19:00

Oriente Petrolero	3–0	Real Mamoré
Alejandro Schiapparelli (yellow card) 26'; Miguel Hoyos 38'; Alcides Peña (yellow card) 43'; Pablo Salinas 59'; Joselito Vaca 67'; Miguel Hoyos (yellow card) 75'	(Report)	Julio César Cortéz (yellow card) 45'; Ovidio Guatía (yellow card) 62'; Juan Pablo Sanchez (yellow card) 71'; Juan Maraude (yellow card) 83'

Estadio Tahuichi Aguilera, Santa Cruz de la Sierra
Attendance: 2,000
Referee: Evert Cuellar

=== Semifinals ===
Teams			Scores		
Team #1	Points	Team #2	1st leg	2nd leg	Playoff
Oriente Petrolero	6:0	Jorge Wilstermann	3–1	1–0	—
San José	3:3	Bolívar	1–0	1–5	2–1

30 June 2010
20:00

Oriente Petrolero	3–1	Jorge Wilstermann
Gabriel Aguilar (yellow card) 12'; Nicolas Suarez (yellow card) 16'; Francisco Argüello (yellow card) 38'; Marcelo Aguirre 45'; Fernando Saucedo (yellow card) 46'; Alcides Peña 66', 71' (yellow card) 41'; Lorgio Suarez (yellow card) 84'	(Report)	Wálter Veizaga (yellow card) 20'; Edgar Olivares (yellow card) 35'; Miguel Ortiz (yellow card) 57'; Amilcar Sanchez (yellow card) 75'; Fernando Sanjurjo (yellow card) 78'; Christian Vargas (yellow card) 82'; Juan Daniel Salaberry (red card)

Estadio Tahuichi Aguilera, Santa Cruz de la Sierra
Attendance: 3,000
Referee: Jose Jordan

4 July 2010
19:00

Jorge Wilstermann	0–1	Oriente Petrolero
Miguel Ortiz (yellow card) 16'; Fernando Sanjurjo (yellow card) 35'; Christian Vargas (yellow card) 59'; Maximiliano Andrada (yellow card) 80'	(Report)	Ariel Ribera (yellow card) 44'; Lorgio Suarez (yellow card) 45'; Miguel Hoyos (yellow card) 53'; Luis Alberto Gutierrez (yellow card) 66'; Alcides Peña 70'

Estadio Felix Capriles, Cochabamba
Attendance: 5,000
Referee: Alejandro Mancilla

=== Finals ===
Teams			Scores		Tie-breakers	
Team #1	Points	Team #2	1st leg	2nd leg	Play-off	Pen.
San José	3:3	Oriente Petrolero	2–0	2–5	1–1	5–6

14 July 2010
20:00

San José	2–0	Oriente Petrolero
Alan Loras 15' (yellow card) 56'; Óscar Díaz 55'; Marcelo Escalante (yellow card) 77'	(Report)	Francisco Argüello (yellow card) 43'; Jhasmani Campos (yellow card) 38'; Luis Alberto Gutierrez (red card); Fernando Saucedo (yellow card) 85'

Estadio Jesús Bermúdez, Oruro
Attendance: 6,000
Referee: Evert Cuellar

18 July 2010
18:00

Oriente Petrolero	5–2	San José
Joselito Vaca 5'; Marcelo Aguirre 57' (yellow card) 79'; Alcides Peña 68'; Jhasmani Campos 71'; Fernando Saucedo 88'	(Report)	Ronald Puma (red card); Regis De Souza 27'; Óscar Díaz 51'; Eloy Padilla (yellow card) 88'

Estadio Ramón Tahuichi Aguilera, Santa Cruz de la Sierra
Attendance: 7,000
Referee: Alejandro Mancilla

3rd Match

21 July 2010
18:30

Oriente Petrolero	1–1	San José
Alcides Peña 10'; Lorgio Suarez (yellow card) 51'; Joselito Vaca (red card); Francisco Argüello (yellow card) 59'; Marcelo Aguirre (yellow card) 62'	(Report)	Marcelo Escalante 17'; Limbert Pizarro (yellow card) 22'; Franklin Herrera (yellow card) 84'
Penalties
(penalty scored) Aguirre; (penalty scored) Campos; (penalty scored) Suarez; (penalty scored) Peña; (penalty scored) Hoyos; (penalty scored) Schiapparelli	6–5	Regis de Souza (penalty scored); Bejarano (penalty scored); Miranda (penalty scored); Escalante (penalty scored); Pizzaro (penalty scored); Ribera (penalty missed)

Estadio Felix Capriles, Cochabamba
Attendance: 10,000
Referee: Jose Jordan

Liga de Fútbol Profesional Boliviano
2010 Torneo Invierno winner

1st title

== Torneo Clausura ==
=== Standings ===
Pos	Team	Pld	W	D	L	GF	GA	GD	Pts	Qualification
1	Oriente Petrolero	22	12	4	6	38	26	+12	40	2011 Copa Libertadores Second Stage
2	Bolívar	22	10	6	6	37	28	+9	36	2011 Copa Libertadores First Stage
3	Aurora	22	10	4	8	34	30	+4	34	2011 Copa Sudamericana Second Stage (Note: Aurora was given the Second Stage spot in the 2011 Copa Sudamericana by the decision of the Bolivian Football Federation.)
4	San José	22	10	4	8	39	37	+2	34	
5	Guabirá	22	9	5	8	22	28	−6	32	

Rules for classification: 1) points; 2) goal difference; 3) number of goals scored.
Notes:

Liga de Fútbol Profesional Boliviano
2010 Campeonato Clausura champion

4th title

=== Results by round ===
Round	1	2	3	4	5	6	7	8	9	10	11	12	13	14	15	16	17	18	19	20	21	22
Ground	A	H	A	A	H	A	H	A	H	A	H	H	H	A	H	A	A	H	H	A	H	A
Result	D	W	D	L	L	L	W	W	W	L	W	W	W	W	D	L	W	W	W	L	W	D
Position	9	1	4	7		10	9		8	9	4	4	3		4	6	4	2	1		1	1

Updated to match(es) played on 13 April. Source: Matches
A = Away; H = Home; W = Win; D = Draw; L = Loss
25 July 2010
16:00

Guabirá	1–1	Oriente Petrolero
Ezequiel Juárez 16'; Ricardo Verduguez (yellow card) 39'; Marcelo Zenteno (yellow card) 79'; Ronald Gutierrez (yellow card) 81'	(Report)	Ariel Ribera (yellow card) 21'; Alcides Peña 36' (yellow card) 69'; Alejandro Schiapparelli (yellow card) 59'; Miguel Hoyos (yellow card) 78'

Estadio Gilberto Parada, Montero
Attendance: 18,000
Referee: Peter Guerrero

1 August 2010
18:00

Oriente Petrolero	3–1	Real Potosi
Alcides Peña 11', 88'; Alejandro Schiapparelli (yellow card) 21'; Francisco Argüello (yellow card) 37'; Jhasmani Campos 42'; Ronal Rea (yellow card) 89'	(Report)	José Luis Contaja (yellow card) 21'; César Yecerotte (yellow card) 37'; Edemir Rodriguez (red card); Miguel Loayza 67'

Estadio Tahuichi Aguilera, Santa Cruz de la Sierra
Attendance: 17,000
Referee: Oscar Maldonado

8 August 2010
16:00

La Paz F.C.	0–0	Oriente Petrolero
Enrique Romaña (yellow card) 41'; Eder Jordan (yellow card) 72'; Carlos Vargas (yellow card) 87'	(Report)	Ariel Ribera (yellow card) 61'; Gustavo Caamaño (yellow card) 89'

Estadio Hernando Siles, La Paz
Referee: Raul Orozco

15 August 2010
15:00

Aurora	2–0	Oriente Petrolero
Jaime Robles (yellow card) 3'; Ignacio Garcia 20'; Carlos Tordoya (yellow card) 66'; Vicente Arce (yellow card) 69'; Arnulfo Valentierra 90'	(Report)	Nicolas Suarez (yellow card) 43'; Danilo Peinado (yellow card) 70'

Estadio Felix Capriles, Cochabamba
Attendance: 9,000
Referee: Alejandro Mancilla

23 September 2010
18:00

Oriente Petrolero B	2–4	Bolivar
Rover Heguigorric 53'; Pedro López (yellow card) 58'; Ronny Montero (yellow card) 75'; José Vargas (yellow card) 87'; Luis Hernán Melgar 90'	(Report)	William Ferreira 20', 80'; Valdeir da Silva Santos (yellow card) 29'; Jose Carlos Da Silva 40'; Abdón Reyes (yellow card) 58'; Rodrigo Vargas 90'; Limbert Méndez (yellow card) 90'

Estadio Tahuichi Aguilera, Santa Cruz de la Sierra
Referee: Raul Orozco

29 August 2010
16:00

Real Mamoré	3–2	Oriente Petrolero
Ivan Zerda 14'; Julio César Cortéz 20'; Ernesto Suarez 39'	(Report)	Fernando Saucedo 21'; Jorge Ramírez 45'

Estadio Gran Mamoré, Trinidad
Attendance: 10,000
Referee: Evert Cuellar

4 September 2010
18:00

Oriente Petrolero	2–1	San Jose
Miguel Hoyos 26'; Alejandro Schiapparelli (red card) 78'; Luis Alberto Gutierrez (yellow card) 78'; Mauricio Saucedo 66'	(Report)	Edgar Escalante (yellow card) 51'; Luis Javier Mendez (yellow card) 56'; Óscar Díaz 80'; Alejandro Rene Bejarano (yellow card) 90'

Estadio Tahuichi Aguilera, Santa Cruz de la Sierra
Attendance: 4,000
Referee: Peter Guerrero

30 September 2010
20:00

Universitario	1–2	Oriente Petrolero
Damián Cirillo 41'; Alejandro Leonel (yellow card) 45'; Tobias Albarracin (yellow card) 84'; Horacio Fernandez (red card)	(Report)	Gabriel Aguilar (yellow card) 13'; Miguel Hoyos (yellow card) 39'; Mauricio Saucedo 53' (yellow card) 90'; Jhasmani Campos (yellow card) 57'; Diego Terrazas 81'; Hugo Suárez (red card)

Estadio Olímpico Patria, Sucre
Attendance: 5,000
Referee: Luis Mancilla

13 September 2010
18:00

Oriente Petrolero	1–0	Blooming
Ronal Rea (yellow card) 37'; Danilo Peinado 60'; Gustavo Caamaño (yellow card) 70'; Jhasmani Campos (yellow card) 74'; Alcides Peña (yellow card) 90'	(Report)	Raúl Gonzales (yellow card) 14'; Fabricio Brandao (yellow card) 19'; Gualberto Mojica (yellow card) 29'

Estadio Tahuichi Aguilera, Santa Cruz de la Sierra
Attendance: 29,000
Referee: Raul Orozco

19 September 2010
16:00

Jorge Wilstermann	4–2	Oriente Petrolero B
Fabricio Lenci 38'; Amilcar Sanchez 53' (red card); Edgar Olivares (yellow card) 58'; Walter Veizaga (yellow card) 71'; Maximiliano Andrada 72'; Juan Daniel Salaberry 90'	(Report)	Carlos Arrien (yellow card) 40'; Robert Heguigorri 45'; Jhasmani Duck (red card); Pablo Rojas 85'; Pedro Canella (yellow card) 90'

Estadio Felix Capriles, Cochabamba
Attendance: 18,000
Referee: Jose Jordan

27 September 2010
18:00

Oriente Petrolero	4–0	The Strongest
Mauricio Saucedo (yellow card) 19'; Luis Alberto Gutierrez 30'; Jhasmani Campos 61'; Ronal Rea (yellow card) 77'; Miguel Hoyos 86'; Fernando Saucedo 90'	(Report)	Herman Soliz (yellow card) 29'; Federico Garcia (yellow card) 42'; Alejandro Chumacero (yellow card) 79'

Estadio Tahuichi Aguilera, Santa Cruz de la Sierra
Attendance: 10,000
Referee: Gery Vargas

4 October 2010
18:00

Oriente Petrolero	1–0	Guabirá
Ronal Rea (red card); Danilo Peinado 12'; Miguel Hoyos (yellow card) 28'; Gustavo Caamaño (yellow card) 53'; Diego Terrazas (yellow card) 68'; Jorge Ramírez (yellow card) 76'	(Report)	Michael Coimbra (yellow card) 23'; Sergio Galarza (yellow card) 24'; Edson Zenteno (yellow card) 44'; Andrés Jiménez (yellow card) 63'; Pedro Velaquez (yellow card) 73'

Estadio Tahuichi Aguilera, Santa Cruz de la Sierra
Attendance: 8,000
Referee: Oscar Maldonado

11 October 2010
18:00

Oriente Petrolero	1–0	La Paz F.C.
Gustavo Caamaño 38'	(Report)

Estadio Tahuichi Aguilera, Santa Cruz de la Sierra
Attendance: 8,000

14 October 2010
18:00

Blooming	1–0	Oriente Petrolero
Wilder Zabala (yellow card) 7'; Hernán Boyero 12'; Sergio Jáuregui (yellow card) 42'	(Report)	Jorge Ramírez (yellow card) 5'; Gustavo Caamaño (yellow card) 21'; Luis Alberto Gutierrez (yellow card) 59'; Joselito Vaca (yellow card) 72'; Danilo Peinado (yellow card) 90'

Estadio Tahuichi Aguilera, Santa Cruz de la Sierra
Referee: Ivan Gamboa

18 October 2010
18:00

Oriente Petrolero	2–2	Aurora
Alejandro Schiapparelli (yellow card) 3'; Gustavo Caamaño 35'; Mauricio Saucedo 77' (yellow card) 78'	(Report)	Osvaldo Moreno 20' (yellow card) 34'; Ronald Rodríguez (red card); Jaime Robles 50'; Carlos Tordoya (yellow card) 67'; Jair Reynoso (yellow card) 75'; Wilder Arevalo (yellow card) 78'; Emmanuel Escobar (yellow card) 80'

Estadio Tahuichi Aguilera, Santa Cruz de la Sierra
Referee: Wilson Estrada

25 October 2010
16:00

Bolivar	2–1	Oriente Petrolero
Enrique Parada (yellow card) 30'; Mario Ovando (yellow card) 30'; Álex da Rosa 45'; Rudy Cardozo 81' da Silva (yellow card) 64'	(Report)	Nicolas Suarez (yellow card) 18'; Danilo Peinado 78'

Estadio Hernando Siles, La Paz

31 October 2010
16:00

San Jose	0–3	Oriente Petrolero
Alan Loras (yellow card) 3'; Ronald Puma (yellow card) 3'; Franklin Herrera (yellow card) 63'; Aquilino Villalba (yellow card) 85'	(Report)	Jhasmani Campos 5'; Miguel Hoyos 14'; Diego Terrazas (yellow card) 51'; Alejandro Schiapparelli (yellow card) 60'; Joselito Vaca (yellow card) 75'; Nicolas Suarez (yellow card) 87'; Alcides Peña 90'

Estadio Jesús Bermúdez, Oruro
Attendance: 12,000
Referee: Alejandro Mancilla

3 November 2010
20:30

Oriente Petrolero	2–0	Real Mamoré
Mauricio Saucedo 9'; Gabriel Aguilar (yellow card) 43'; Danilo Peinado 54'; Alcides Peña (yellow card) 69'; Diego Terrazas (yellow card) 89'	(Report)

Estadio Tahuichi Aguilera, Santa Cruz de la Sierra

7 November 2010
18:00

Oriente Petrolero	3–1	Universitario
Joselito Vaca 51'; Danilo Peinado 69', 79'	(Report)	Milton Erick Melgar 18'

Estadio Tahuichi Aguilera, Santa Cruz de la Sierra
Attendance: 18,000

22 November 2010
18:00

Oriente Petrolero	3–1	Jorge Wilstermann
Mauricio Saucedo (yellow card) 11'; Jhasmani Campos 33'; Alejandro Schiapparelli 65'; Fernando Saucedo 83'	(Report)	Christian Vargas 9'; Fernando Sanjurjo (yellow card) 28'; Victor Hugo Melgar (yellow card) 49'; Nilton de Oliveira (red card)

Estadio Tahuichi Aguilera, Santa Cruz de la Sierra
Attendance: 20,000
Referee: Gary Vargas

25 November 2010
18:00

Real Potosi	1–2	Oriente Petrolero
Gonzalo Galindo (yellow card) 17'; Cristian Maciel Ruíz 19'; Ronny Jiménez (yellow card) 36'; Miguel Loayza 61'	(Report)	José Carlo Fernández (yellow card) 69'; Nicolas Suarez (yellow card) 8'; Joselito Vaca 62'; Diego Terrazas (yellow card) 65'; Danilo Peinado (yellow card) 65'; Luis Alberto Gutierrez (yellow card) 68'; Alcides Peña 87'

Estadio Victor Agustín Ugarte, Potosi
Attendance: 2,000
Referee: Ivan Gamboa

29 November 2010
16:00

The Strongest	1–1	Oriente Petrolero
Walter Javier López 76'; Miguel Angel Barriga 90'	(Report)	Jhasmani Campos (yellow card) 10' (goal) 23'; Miguel Hoyos (yellow card) 77'

Estadio Hernando Siles, La Paz
Attendance: 18,000
Referee: Alejandro Mancilla

=== Copa Sudamericana ===
==== First stage ====
In the First Stage, 16 teams will play two-legged ties (one game at home and one game away) against another opponent. The winner of each tie advances to the Second Stage. Team #1 will play the second leg at home.

Teams			Scores		Tie-breakers		
Team #1	Points	Team #2	1st leg	2nd leg	GD	AG	Pen.
Oriente Petrolero (Bolivia)	4:1	Universidad de Chile	2–2	1–0	–	–	–

August 24, 2010
19:15 (UTC-4)

Universidad de Chile	2–2	(Bolivia) Oriente Petrolero
Bueno 49'; Matías Rodríguez (yellow card) 57'; Puch 70'; Diego Rivarola (yellow card) 74'	Report	Jhasmani Campos (yellow card) 25'; Luis Alberto Gutierrez (yellow card) 40'; Alejandro Schiapparelli (yellow card) 40'; Rea 46'; Saucedo 48'; José Carlo Fernández (yellow card) 78'

Estadio Nacional, Santiago
Attendance: 18,000
Referee: Víctor Hugo Rivera (Peru)

August 31, 2010
18:45 (UTC-4)

Oriente Petrolero (Bolivia)	1–0	Universidad de Chile
Danilo Peinado 10' (yellow card) 83'	(Report)	Ángel Rojas (yellow card) 82'

Estadio Tahuichi Aguilera
Attendance: 30,000
Referee: Enrique Cáceres (Paraguay)

==== Second stage ====
Teams			Scores		Tie-breakers		
Team #1	Points	Team #2	1st leg	2nd leg	GD	AG	Pen.
Deportes Tolima (Colombia)	3:3	Oriente Petrolero (Bolivia)	0–1	2–0	–	–	–

September 14, 2010
20:45 (UTC-4)

Oriente Petrolero (Bolivia)	1–0	(Colombia) Deportes Tolima
Francisco Argüello (yellow card) 27'; Miguel Hoyos (yellow card) 70'; Mauricio Saucedo 80' (yellow card) 81'	(Report)	Yair Arrechea (yellow card) 29'; Danny Aguilar (yellow card) 34'; Wilder Medina (yellow card) 78'

Estadio Tahuichi Aguilera
Attendance: 30,000
Referee: Darío Ubriaco (Uruguay)

September 21, 2010
20:45 (UTC-5)

Deportes Tolima (Colombia)	2–0	(Bolivia) Oriente Petrolero
Wilder Medina 3'; Jorge Perlaza 26'; Jhon Hurtado (yellow card) 35'; Rodrigo Marangoni (yellow card) 72'; Yair Arrechea (yellow card) 73'; Hugo Pablo Centurión (yellow card) 89'	(Report)	Danilo Peinado (red card); Nicolas Suarez (yellow card) 32'; Luis Alberto Gutierrez (yellow card) 66'; Ronald Rea (yellow card) 77'; Alejandro Schiapparelli (yellow card) 90'

Estadio Manuel Murillo Toro
Attendance: 28,000
Referee: Juan Soto (Venezuela)
