= Clásico Cruceño =

El Clásico Cruceño ,
- Other names: El Clasico, El Super Clásico Cruceño
- Location: (Bolivia) Santa Cruz de la Sierra
- Teams: Blooming & Oriente Petrolero
- First meeting: 1970

The Clasico Cruceño is a classic match between Oriente Petrolero and Blooming, both from the city of Santa Cruz de la Sierra, Bolivia. By today, it is one of the most heavily contested classics of Bolivian football, with the derby attracting some of the greatest attendances in Bolivian football. It has a history of violence amongst both hooligans and ordinary supporters.

== Statistics ==
As of 11 August 2024

Type	Competition	Games played	Blooming wins	Draws	Oriente Petrolero wins	Blooming goals	Oriente Petrolero goals
Regional	Campeonato Cruceño	47	11	12	24	73	104
Regional	Total Regional Matches	47	11	12	24	73	104
National	Bolivian Primera División	195	58	60	77	257	298
National	Copa de la Liga	2	2	0	0	8	2
National	Liguilla Pre-Sudamericana	2	1	1	0	3	2
National	Playoffs	6	2	2	2	8	8
National	Total National Matches	205	63	63	79	276	310
CONMEBOL competitions	Copa Libertadores	2	1	1	0	2	1
CONMEBOL competitions	Total (CONMEBOL)	2	1	1	0	2	1
Total (official matches)		254	75	76	103	351	415

== League Matches ==
Date	Home	Score	Away
2005 Apertura	Blooming	2:1	Oriente Petrolero
2005 Apertura	Oriente Petrolero	1:1	Blooming
2005 Clausura	Blooming	1:1	Oriente Petrolero
2005 Clausura	Oriente Petrolero	1:1	Blooming
2005 Hexagonal	Blooming	1:0	Oriente Petrolero
2005 Hexagonal	Oriente Petrolero	3:1	Blooming
2006 Apertura	Blooming	4:1	Oriente Petrolero
2006 Apertura	Oriente Petrolero	1:1	Blooming
2006 Clausura	Oriente Petrolero	4:1	Blooming
2006 Clausura	Blooming	1:1	Oriente Petrolero
2006 Hexagonal	Blooming	1:1	Oriente Petrolero
2006 Hexagonal	Oriente Petrolero	1:1	Blooming
2007 Apertura	Blooming	2:1	Oriente Petrolero
2007 Apertura	Oriente Petrolero	2:0	Blooming
2007 Clausura	Blooming	2:1	Oriente Petrolero
2007 Clausura	Oriente Petrolero	1:2	Blooming
2008 Apertura	Blooming	4:3	Oriente Petrolero
2008 Apertura	Oriente Petrolero	2:1	Blooming'
2008 Clausura	Blooming	0:2	Oriente Petrolero
2008 Clausura	Oriente Petrolero	0:2	Blooming
2008 Play-Off	Blooming	3:3	Oriente Petrolero
2008 Play-Off	Oriente Petrolero	1:2	Blooming

== All League Matches ==
These are only the league matches. The club name being in bold indicates a win.

Game	Date	Round	Home team	Away team	Score (H/T)	Goals (home)	Goals (away)
-	28 February 2009 (Apertura)	6	**Blooming**	Oriente Petrolero	**2-0** (1-0)	Gómez (34), Álvarez (67)	
-	9 May 2009 (Apertura)	18	**Oriente Petrolero**	Blooming	**2-0** (0-0)	Arce (53), Vaca (69)	
-	18 July 2009 (Clausura)	5	Blooming	Oriente Petrolero	**1-1** (1-0)	Boyero (13)	Aguirre (60)
-	29 August 2009 (Clausura)	4	Oriente Petrolero	Blooming	**2-2** (1-0)	Cabrera (15), Medina (62)	Boyero (74), Vargas (85)
-	26 September 2009 (Clausura-Hexagonal)	1st leg	**Oriente Petrolero**	Blooming	**3-2** (1-1)	Mendez (18), Peña (60),(83)	Akerman (33), Sucha (76)
-	30 September 2009 (Clausura-Hexagonal)	2nd leg	**Blooming**	Oriente Petrolero	**1-0** (1-0)	Akerman (49)	
-	11 October 2009 (Play-Off)	1st Leg	**Oriente Petrolero**	Blooming	**1-0** (0-0)	Vaca (56)	
-	18 October 2009 (Play-Off)	2nd Leg	Blooming	Oriente Petrolero	**1-1** (1-1)	Chaves (14)	Vaca (34)
147	28 March 2010 (Apertura)	5	**Oriente Petrolero**	Blooming	**2-0** (1-0)	Palacios (44), Hoyos (55)	
148	25 April 2010 (Apertura)	9	**Blooming**	Oriente Petrolero	**1-0** (0-0)	Castillo (33)	
149	16 June 2010 (Torneo Invierno)	First Leg	Blooming	**Oriente Petrolero**	**1-2** (1-1)	Gualberto Mojica (37)	Alcides Peña (35), Jorge Ramírez (51)
150	20 June 2010 (Torneo Invierno)	Second Leg	Oriente Petrolero	**Blooming**	**0-1** (1-1)		José Alfredo Castillo (42)
151	13 September 2010 (Torneo Clausura)	First Leg	**Oriente Petrolero**	Blooming	1-0 (0-0)	Danilo Peinado (60)	
152	14 October 2010 (Torneo Clausura)	Second Leg	**Blooming**	Oriente Petrolero	**1-0** (1-0)	Hernán Boyero (12)	
153	6 February 2011 (Torneo Adecuacion)	First Leg	Blooming	**Oriente Petrolero**	**0-2** (0-1)		Mauricio Saucedo (24), Marcelo Aguirre (82)

== Players to have played for both clubs ==
Please note - this is a non-exhaustive list of players to have played for both clubs

- (Bolivia) José Alfredo Castillo
- (Bolivia) Lorgio Álvarez
- (Bolivia) Joselito Vaca
- (Bolivia) Raúl Justiniano
- (Argentina) Andrés Imperiale
- (Bolivia) Diego Cabrera
- (Brazil) Álex da Rosa
- (Argentina) Alejandro Schiapparelli
- (Bolivia) Rubén Tufiño
- (Bolivia) Nicolás Suárez Vaca
- (Bolivia) Berthy Suárez
- (Bolivia) José Milton Melgar
- (Bolivia) José Loayza
- (Bolivia) Jose Carlos
- (Bolivia) Víctor Hugo Antelo
- (Bolivia) Erwin Romero
- (Bolivia) Mario Pinedo
- (Bolivia) Darwin Peña
- (Argentina) Osvaldo Ozzán
- (Bolivia) Martín Menacho
