= Oriente Petrolero in South America =

Historic South American football matches

These are Oriente Petrolero matches in South America.

== Matches in ==
Season	Competition	Round	Opposition	Score
1972	Copa Libertadores	Group 2	(Ecuador) América de Quito	4–2 Tahuichi Aguilera; 3–0 (A)
1972	Copa Libertadores	Group 2	(Bolivia) Chaco Petrolero	5–0 Tahuichi Aguilera; 1–0 (A)
1972	Copa Libertadores	Group 2	(Ecuador) Barcelona	0-0 Tahuichi Aguilera; 1-1 (A)
1973	Copa Libertadores	Group 1	(Argentina) River Plate	1–3 Tahuichi Aguilera; 7–1 (A)
1973	Copa Libertadores	Group 1	(Bolivia) Wilstermann	3-1 Tahuichi Aguilera; 1-0 (A)
1973	Copa Libertadores	Group 1	(Argentina) San Lorenzo	0-3 Tahuichi Aguilera; 4-0 (A)
1977	Copa Libertadores	Group 1	(Colombia) Atlético Nacional	3-1 (A); 4-0 Tahuichi Aguilera
1977	Copa Libertadores	Group 1	(Bolivia) Bolivar	0-0 Tahuichi Aguilera; 1-0 (A)
1977	Copa Libertadores	Group 1	(Colombia) Deportivo Cali	3-0 (A); 1-0 Tahuichi Aguilera
1979	Copa Libertadores	Group 2	(Bolivia) The Strongest	2-0 (A); 4-1 Tahuichi Aguilera
1979	Copa Libertadores	Group 2	(Peru) Alianza Lima	0-4 Tahuichi Aguilera; 5-1 (A)
1979	Copa Libertadores	Group 2	(Peru) Sporting Cristal	0-1 Tahuichi Aguilera; 1-0 (A)
1980	Copa Libertadores	Group 2	(Bolivia) The Strongest	1-0 Tahuichi Aguilera; 3-2 (A)
1980	Copa Libertadores	Group 2	(Uruguay) Nacional	1-3 Tahuichi Aguilera; 5-0 (A)
1980	Copa Libertadores	Group 2	(Uruguay) Defensor Sporting	0-1 Tahuichi Aguilera; 1-1 (A)
1985	Copa Libertadores	Group B	(Bolivia) Blooming	1-1 (A); 0-1 Tahuichi Aguilera
1985	Copa Libertadores	Group B	(Venezuela) Deportivo Táchira	1-1 (A); 3-2 Tahuichi Aguilera
1985	Copa Libertadores	Group B	(Venezuela) Deportivo Italia	0-3 (A); 3-1 Tahuichi Aguilera
1987	Copa Libertadores	Group 2	(Bolivia) The Strongest	3-2 (A); 2-1 Tahuichi Aguilera
1987	Copa Libertadores	Group 2	(Colombia) Deportivo Cali	0-1 Tahuichi Aguilera; 5-1 (A)
1987	Copa Libertadores	Group 2	(Colombia) América de Cali	1-1 Tahuichi Aguilera; 3-1 (A)
1988	Copa Libertadores	Group 4	(Bolivia) Bolivar	1-2 (A); 1-3 Tahuichi Aguilera
1988	Copa Libertadores	Group 4	(Paraguay) Cerro Porteño	2-2 Tahuichi Aguilera; 1-0
1988	Copa Libertadores	Group 4	(Paraguay) Olimpia	1-0 Tahuichi Aguilera; 1-2
1988	Copa Libertadores	Second Round	(Chile) Colo-Colo	2-1 Tahuichi Aguilera; 0-0 (A)
1988	Copa Libertadores	Quarter-Finals	(Colombia) América de Cali	1-1 Tahuichi Aguilera; 2-0 (A)
1990	Copa Libertadores	Group 5	(Bolivia) The Strongest	2-0 (A); 1-0 Tahuichi Aguilera
1990	Copa Libertadores	Group 5	(Ecuador) Barcelona	2-1 (A); 1-1 Tahuichi Aguilera
1990	Copa Libertadores	Group 5	(Ecuador) Emelec	1-0 Tahuichi Aguilera; 2-2 (A)
1991	Copa Libertadores	Group 1	(Bolivia) Bolivar	2-0 (A); 2-1 Tahuichi Aguilera
1991	Copa Libertadores	Group 1	(Argentina) River Plate	1-1 Tahuichi Aguilera; 3-1 (A)
1991	Copa Libertadores	Group 1	(Argentina) Boca Juniors	1-0 Tahuichi Aguilera; 0-0 (A)
1991	Copa Libertadores	Round of 16	(Paraguay) Cerro Porteño	1-1 Tahuichi Aguilera; 2-0 (A)
1997	Copa Libertadores	Group 1	(Bolivia) Bolivar	0-4 Tahuichi Aguilera; 3-3 (A)
1997	Copa Libertadores	Group 1	(Paraguay) Guaraní	4-1 Tahuichi Aguilera; 0-0 (A)
1997	Copa Libertadores	Group 1	(Paraguay) Cerro Porteño	1-0 Tahuichi Aguilera; 2-1 (A)
1997	Copa Libertadores	Round of 16	(Chile) Universidad Católica	0-4 Tahuichi Aguilera; 5-1 (A)
1998	Copa Libertadores	Group 4	(Bolivia) Bolivar	3-2 (A); 1-1 Tahuichi Aguilera
1998	Copa Libertadores	Group 4	(Uruguay) Nacional	2-1 Tahuichi Aguilera; 4-1 (A)
1998	Copa Libertadores	Group 4	(Uruguay) Peñarol	0-0 Tahuichi Aguilera; 6-1 (A)
2000	Copa Merconorte	Group D	(Peru) Sporting Cristal	1-1 Tahuichi Aguilera; 5-1 (A)
2000	Copa Merconorte	Group D	(Mexico) Pachuca	2-1 (A); 3-1 Tahuichi Aguilera
2000	Copa Merconorte	Group D	(Ecuador) Emelec	2-1 (A); 0-0 Tahuichi Aguilera
2001	Copa Libertadores	Group 8	(Colombia) Deportivo Cali	1-3 Tahuichi Aguilera; 4-1 (A)
2001	Copa Libertadores	Group 8	(Argentina) Boca Juniors	2-1 (A); 0-1 Tahuichi Aguilera
2001	Copa Libertadores	Group 8	(Chile) Cobreloa	2-1 (A); 2-2 Tahuichi Aguilera
2002	Copa Libertadores	Group 2	(Paraguay) 12 de Octubre	1-0 Tahuichi Aguilera; 3-2 (A)
2002	Copa Libertadores	Group 2	(Brazil) Grêmio	3-2 (A); 2-4 TAhuichi Aguilera
2002	Copa Libertadores	Group 2	(Peru) Cienciano	3-1 Estadio Tahuichi Aguilera; 2-0 (A)
2002	Copa Sudamericana	First Stage	(Bolivia) Bolivar	4-2 (A); 1-0 Tahuichi Aguilera
2003	Copa Libertadores	Groups 6	(Uruguay) Racing	0-1 Tahuichi Aguilera; 2-0 (A)
2003	Copa Libertadores	Group 6	(Peru) Universitario	2-0 (A); 2-2 Tahuichi Aguilera
2003	Copa Libertadores	Group 6	(Uruguay) Nacional	3-0 (A); 2-3 Tahuichi Aguilera
2005	Copa Libertadores	First Stage	(Colombia) Atlético Junior	1-2 Tahuichi Aguilera; 3-1 (A)
2006	Copa Libertadores	First Stage	(Argentina) River Plate	6-0 (A); 0-2 Tahuichi Aguilera
2010	Cuadrangular Internacional Del Peru	Group Stage	(Peru) Deportivo Garcilaso	2-3 (A)
2010	Cuadrangular Internacional Del Peru	Group Stage	(Ecuador) Deportivo Cuenca	2-1 (A)
2010	Cuadrangular Internacional Del Peru	Group Stage	(Peru) Cienciano	1-0 (A)
2010	Copa Sudamericana	First Stage	Universidad de Chile	2-2 (A); 1-0 Tahuichi Aguilera
2010	Copa Sudamericana	Second Stage	(Colombia) Deportes Tolima	1-0 Tahuichi Aguilera; 2-0 (A)
2011	Copa Libertadores	Group Stage	(Brazil) Grêmio	(A); Tahuichi Aguilera
2011	Copa Libertadores	Group Stage	(Colombia) Junior	Tahuichi Aguilera (A)
2011	Copa Libertadores	Group Stage	(Peru) León de Huánuco	(A); Tahuichi Aguilera

=== References ===
- Oriente en la Copa Libertadores^{[usurped]}
- Oriente historia y futbol^{[usurped]}
- Oriente en Copa Sudamericana^{[usurped]}
