= Jhasmani Campos =

Bolivian footballer (born 1988)

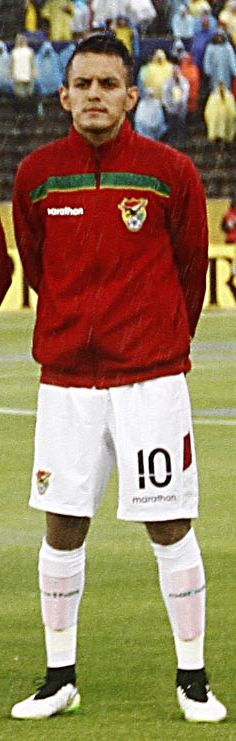
- Campos playing for Bolivia in 2015

Personal information
- Full name: Jhasmani Campos Dávalos
- Date of birth: 10 May 1988 (age 38)
- Place of birth: Santa Cruz de la Sierra, Bolivia
- Height: 1.74 m (5 ft 9 in)
- Positions: Attacking midfielder; winger

Youth career
- 1997–2005: Tahuichi Academy
- 2005–2006: Grêmio

Senior career*
| Years | Team | Apps | (Gls) |
| 2006–2011 | Oriente Petrolero | 152 | (33) |
| 2011–2015 | Bolívar | 73 | (18) |
| 2013–2014 | → Muaither SC (loan) | 23 | (9) |
| 2014 | → Al-Orobah (loan) | 8 | (0) |
| 2015–2016 | Kazma | 0 | (0) |
| 2016 | Sport Boys | 18 | (7) |
| 2017 | Bangkok Glass | 31 | (10) |
| 2018–2020 | The Strongest | 95 | (12) |
| 2021 | Real Santa Cruz | 13 | (0) |
| 2022 | Independiente Petrolero | 24 | (0) |

International career^{‡}
| 2007 | Bolivia U-20 | 4 | (2) |
| 2007–2020 | Bolivia | 55 | (5) |
- * Club domestic league appearances and goals as of 10:25, 16 April 2022 (UTC) ‡ National team caps and goals as of 10:25, 16 April 2022 (UTC)

Jhasmani Campos Dávalos (born 10 May 1988) is a Bolivian professional footballer who plays as an attacking midfielder or winger.

== Club career ==
Campos began his career at an early age with the Ramon Tahuichi Aguilera Academy. While playing at a youth football tournament in Uruguay with the academy in 2005, he was spotted by a talent scout from Brazilian club Grêmio, who brought him to Porto Alegre to join the youth team later that year. After six months of negotiations, Grêmio did not come to a mutual agreement with Tahuichi to acquire Campos, and he returned to Bolivia in 2006. That same year, he signed with first division club Oriente Petrolero and in short time he earned his place in the starting line-up. As the season developed Campos proved to be a vital part of the team. He displayed such a great technique, that with only 18 years of age he turned into one of the most significant players in the league. In May 2009, Brazilian team Bahia was close from signing Campos, but due to some economic disparities among parts his transfer was frustrated. Campos was the most expensive player in Bolivian Football receiving $750.000. He scored a brace in Bolivar's 2–1 round of 16 victory against reigning Copa Libertadores champions Santos. In July 2013 Campos was loaned to Qatari first division club Muaither SC for one year.

== International career ==
In 2007 Campos joined the Bolivia U20 national team for the South American Youth Championship held in Paraguay, where he scored two goals in four games. He also received his first call-up to the senior national team for a friendly match against South Africa on 28 March. In June of that year, he played for Bolivia in Copa América 2007, scoring his first international goal against Peru. As of 1 June 2015, he has represented his country in 13 FIFA World Cup qualification matches.

=== International goals ===
Scores and results list Bolivia's goal tally first.

List of international goals scored by Jhasmani Campos
| No. | Date | Venue | Opponent | Score | Result | Competition |
|---|---|---|---|---|---|---|
| 1 | 3 July 2007 | Metropolitano de Mérida, Mérida, Venezuela | Peru | 2–1 | 2–2 | 2007 Copa América |
| 2 | 7 June 2013 | Estadio Hernando Siles, La Paz, Bolivia | Venezuela | 1–1 | 1–1 | 2014 FIFA World Cup qualification |
| 3 | 10 June 2016 | Gillette Stadium, Foxborough, United States | Chile | 1–1 | 1–2 | Copa América Centenario |
| 4 | 9 June 2018 | Liebenauer Stadium, Graz, Liebenau, Austria | Serbia | 1–4 | 1–5 | Friendly |
| 5 | 10 September 2018 | Prince Faisal bin Fahd Stadium, Riyadh, Saudi Arabia | Saudi Arabia | 1–2 | 2–2 | Friendly |

== Honors ==
Oriente Petroleo

- Bolivian Primera División
  - Winner: 2010 Clausura
  - Runner-up: 2010 Apertura

The Strongest

- Bolivian Primera División runner-up: 2018 Apertura, 2018 Clausura, 2019 Apertura, 2019 Clausura
