= 2010 Liga de Fútbol Profesional Boliviano =

Liga de Fútbol Profesional Boliviano
- Season: 2010
- Champions: Apertura: Jorge Wilstermann (5th title); Clausura: Oriente Petrolero (4th title)
- Relegated: Jorge Wilstermann
- 2011 Copa Libertadores: Jorge Wilstermann; Oriente Petrolero; Bolívar
- 2010 Copa Sudamericana: Universitario
- 2011 Copa Sudamericana: Aurora; The Strongest; San José
- Top goalscorer: Apertura: Cristian Díaz (18 goals)
- Biggest home win: Bolívar 6–1 Real Mamoré (March 13); Universitario 5–0 Real Potosí (April 25)
- Biggest away win: San José 0–3 Aurora (May 27); La Paz 1–4 San José (June 19)
- Highest scoring: Aurora 4–4 San José (May 9); Aurora 3–5 The Strongest (June 6); Real Potosí 5–3 Bolívar (June 24)

The 2010 Liga de Fútbol Profesional Boliviano season is the 34th season of Bolivia's top-flight professional football league. The season is split into two championships—the Apertura and the Clausura—and the Torneo de Invierno

== Format ==
The 2009 season will be divided into two championships and a cup, each with their own format.

Campeonato Apertura

The Apertura championship will be divided into two phases. The first phase will have the twelve teams divided into two groups. The teams will play within each group, in addition to a cross-group rivalry (for example: Oriente vs. Blooming). The best-three teams in each group will advance to the Winner's Hexagonal, while the rest of the teams will play the Loser's Hexagonal. In each hexagonal, each team will play within each group. The winner of the Winner's Hexagonal will be declared the champion and will qualify to 2011 Copa Libertadores with the Bolivia 2 berth. The runner-up will qualify to the 2011 Copa Sudamericana with the Bolivia 1 berth and the winner of the Loser's Hexagonal will qualify to 2010 Copa Sudamericana with the Bolivia 3 berth.

Torneo de Invierno

The Torneo de Invierno (English: Winter Tournament) will be what was traditionally known as the Play-Off. The first stage will have the twelve teams play against a local rival over two legs. The winners of each tie and the two best losers will advance to the quarterfinals. The cup will continue on a single-elimination basis with two legs per stage. The winner will qualify to the 2011 Copa Sudamericana as the Bolivia 3 berth.

Campeonato Clausura

The Clausura championship will be a double round-robin league format. The team with the most points after the twenty-two rounds will be declared the champion and will qualify to the 2011 Copa Libertadores as the Bolivia 1 berth. The runner-up will qualify to the 2011 Copa Libertadores as the Bolivia 3 berth and the third placed-team will qualify to the 2011 Copa Sudamericana with the Bolivia 2 berth.

Relegation

Relegation will be determined after the Clausura. The team with the worst two-year average will be relegated to the Regional Leagues, while the next-worst team will contest a playoff against the runner-up of the 2010 Copa Simón Bolívar.

== Teams ==
The number of teams for 2010 remains the same. Nacional Potosí finished last in the 2009 relegation table and was relegated to the Bolivian Football Regional Leagues. They were replaced by the 2009 Copa Simón Bolívar champion Guabirá, who last played in the LFPB in 2008.

Locations of the 2010 LFPB teams

Team	Home city	Home stadium	Manager
Aurora	Cochabamba	Félix Capriles	Julio Alberto Zamora
Blooming	Santa Cruz	Ramón Tahuichi Aguilera	Carlos Aragones
Bolívar	La Paz	Hernando Siles	Néstor Clausen
Guabirá	Montero	Gilberto Parada	Claudio Chacior
Jorge Wilstermann	Cochabamba	Félix Capriles	Eduardo Villegas
La Paz	La Paz	Hernando Siles	Sergio Apaza
Oriente Petrolero	Santa Cruz	Ramón Tahuichi Aguilera	Gustavo Quinteros
Real Mamoré	Trinidad	Gran Mamoré	Buenaventura Ferreira
Real Potosí	Potosí	Víctor Agustín Ugarte	Víctor Hugo Andrada
San José	Oruro	Jesús Bermúdez	Marco Ferrufino
The Strongest	La Paz	Hernando Siles	Néstor Craviotto
Universitario de Sucre	Sucre	Olímpico Patria	Javier Vega

== Campeonato Apertura ==
The Campeonato Apertura (officially the Campeonato Apertura Entel for sponsorship reasons) is the first championship of this season. The championship began on February 20 and ended June 9, two days before the start of the 2010 FIFA World Cup at South Africa.

=== First phase ===
==== Serie A ====
Standings

Pos	Team	Pld	W	D	L	GF	GA	GD	Pts	Qualification
1	The Strongest	12	5	4	3	21	18	+3	19	Advanced to the Winner's Hexagonal
2	San José	12	5	3	4	24	19	+5	18	Advanced to the Winner's Hexagonal
3	Aurora	12	4	5	3	17	16	+1	17	Advanced to the Winner's Hexagonal
4	Universitario de Sucre	12	5	1	6	21	18	+3	16	Advanced to the Loser's Hexagonal
5	Guabirá	12	3	3	6	15	24	−9	12	Advanced to the Loser's Hexagonal
6	Blooming	12	3	2	7	13	20	−7	11	Advanced to the Loser's Hexagonal

Updated to match(es) played on May 6, 2010. Source: RSSSF
Rules for classification: 1) points; 2) goal difference; 3) number of goals scored.

Results

Home \ Away	AUR	BLO	GUA	SJO	STR	UNI
Aurora		2–0	0–0	2–1	1–1	2–1
Blooming	1–1		4–1	1–3	1–1	1–0
Guabirá	3–3	3–1		1–1	2–1	2–0
San José	0–1	3–1	3–0		2–2	0–0
The Strongest	2–1	2–1	2–1	3–2		2–3
Universitario de Sucre	3–2	2–1	4–1	2–3	1–3	

Updated to match(es) played on May 6, 2010. Source: RSSSF
Legend: Blue = home team win; Yellow = draw; Red = away team win.

==== Serie B ====
Standings

Pos	Team	Pld	W	D	L	GF	GA	GD	Pts	Qualification
1	Bolívar	12	9	1	2	23	11	+12	28	Advanced to the Winner's Hexagonal
2	Oriente Petrolero	12	7	1	4	21	10	+11	22	Advanced to the Winner's Hexagonal
3	Jorge Wilstermann	12	5	3	4	17	17	0	18	Advanced to the Winner's Hexagonal
4	Real Potosí	12	5	1	6	11	19	−8	16	Advanced to the Loser's Hexagonal
5	La Paz	12	4	2	6	19	19	0	14	Advanced to the Loser's Hexagonal
6	Real Mamoré	12	4	0	8	15	25	−10	12	Advanced to the Loser's Hexagonal

Updated to match(es) played on May 6, 2010. Source: RSSSF
Rules for classification: 1) points; 2) goal difference; 3) number of goals scored.

Results

Home \ Away	BOL	WIL	LPA	OPE	RMA	RPO
Bolívar		1–2	1–0	1–0	6–1	2–1
Jorge Wilstermann	0–1		3–3	1–0	2–0	2–0
La Paz	0–1	2–2		2–1	2–0	0–1
Oriente Petrolero	3–1	3–1	2–1		5–1	3–0
Real Mamoré	1–3	1–0	1–2	1–2		3–0
Real Potosí	1–3	3–0	2–0	0–0	2–1	

Updated to match(es) played on May 6, 2010. Source: RSSSF
Legend: Blue = home team win; Yellow = draw; Red = away team win.

==== Inter-series results ====
Home Team	Results	Away Team
—
The Strongest	2–2	Bolívar
Bolívar	1–0	The Strongest
—
Real Mamoré	3–0	Guabirá
Guabirá	1–2	Real Mamoré
—
Oriente Petrolero	2–0	Blooming
Blooming	1–0	Oriente Petrolero
—
La Paz	4–2	San José
San José	4–2	La Paz
—
Aurora	1–2	Jorge Wilstermann
Jorge Wilstermann	2–2	Aurora
—
Real Potosí	1–0	Universitario de Sucre
Universitario de Sucre	5–0	Real Potosí

=== Second phase ===
The Second Phase began on May 8.

==== Winner's Hexagonal ====
Standings

Pos	Team	Pld	W	D	L	GF	GA	GD	Pts	Qualification
1	Jorge Wilstermann	10	6	2	2	15	11	+4	20	2011 Copa Libertadores Second Stage
2	Oriente Petrolero	10	6	1	3	18	11	+7	19	
3	Aurora	10	4	2	4	19	18	+1	14	
4	The Strongest	10	3	4	3	15	14	+1	13	2011 Copa Sudamericana First Stage (Note: The Strongest qualified for the 2011 Copa Sudamericana, as Oriente Petrolero later qualified for the 2011 Copa Libertadores and Aurora also later qualified for the 2011 Copa Sudamericana through the Clausura.)
5	Bolívar	10	3	2	5	7	14	−7	11	
6	San José	10	1	3	6	13	24	−11	6	

Source: Soccer Way
Rules for classification: 1) points; 2) goal difference; 3) number of goals scored.
Notes:

Liga de Fútbol Profesional Boliviano
2010 Campeonato Clausura champion

5th title

Results

Home \ Away	AUR	BOL	WIL	OPE	SJO	STR
Aurora		2–2	2–0	2–1	4–4	3–5
Bolívar	1–0		0–1	2–1	1–0	0–1
Jorge Wilstermann	2–1	2–0		1–3	3–1	2–1
Oriente Petrolero	1–2	2–0	1–1		4–0	2–1
San José	0–3	4–3	1–2	0–1		1–1
The Strongest	2–1	1–1	1–1	1–2	1–1	

Updated to match(es) played on unknown. Source: Soccer Way
Legend: Blue = home team win; Yellow = draw; Red = away team win.

==== Loser's Hexagonal ====
Standings

Pos	Team	Pld	W	D	L	GF	GA	GD	Pts	Qualification
1	Universitario de Sucre	10	6	2	2	20	10	+10	20	2010 Copa Sudamericana First Stage
2	Blooming	10	6	1	3	21	15	+6	19	
3	Real Potosí	10	5	1	4	19	16	+3	16	
4	La Paz	10	3	2	5	17	16	+1	11	
5	Real Mamoré	10	3	2	5	10	20	−10	11	
6	Guabirá	10	3	0	7	10	19	−9	9	

Source: Soccer Way
Rules for classification: 1) points; 2) goal difference; 3) number of goals scored.

Results

Home \ Away	BLO	GUA	LPA	RMA	RPO	UNI
Blooming		2–0	4–3	3–0	5–2	2–1
Guabirá	0–1		3–1	3–2	1–0	0–1
La Paz	2–0	5–1		3–0	0–2	0–0
Real Mamoré	2–2	1–0	2–1		1–0	1–1
Real Potosí	3–2	3–0	1–1	3–1		4–3
Universitario de Sucre	2–0	3–1	3–1	4–0	2–1	

Updated to match(es) played on unknown. Source: Soccer Way
Legend: Blue = home team win; Yellow = draw; Red = away team win.

=== Top goalscorers ===
Pos	Player	Player nationality	Club	Goals
1	Cristian Díaz	Argentine	San José	18
2	Jair Reynoso	Colombian	Aurora	13
3	Roberto Galindo	Bolivian	Universitario de Sucre	12
4	José Alfredo Castillo	Bolivian	Blooming	11
4	William Ferreira	Uruguayan	Bolívar	11
4	Juan Alberto Maraude	Argentine	Real Mamoré	11
5	Helmut Gutíerrez	Bolivian	Real Potosí	10
6	Carlos Saucedo	Bolivian	Aurora	9
7	Jorge Ramírez	Uruguayan	Oriente Petrolero	8
8	Marcelo Aguirre	Argentine	Oriente Petrolero	7
8	Augusto Andaveris	Bolivian	Real Potosí	7
8	Óscar Alberto Díaz	Bolivian	San José	7
8	Javier Martín López	Argentine	The Strongest	7

== Torneo de Invierno ==
The Torneo de Invierno (officially the Torneo de Invierno Entel for sponsorship reasons) will be played in the middle of this season, concurrent to the 2010 FIFA World Cup. The winner will earn the Bolivia 3 berth for the 2010 Copa Sudamericana.

=== First stage ===
The first phase will be contested over a series of six regional derbies (rivalries). The winners of each tie will be determined in a manner similar to the Copa Libertadores: 1st points, 2nd goal difference; 3rd away goals, 4th penalty shoot-out. The six winners (in bold) and the two best losers (in italics) will advance to the second phase. Team #1 played the first leg at home.

Teams			Scores		Tie-breakers		
Team #1	Points	Team #2	1st leg	2nd leg	GD	AG	Pen.
**Real Potosí**	3:3	Universitario de Sucre	3–0	0–2	+1:–1	—	—
Blooming	3:3	**Oriente Petrolero**	1–2	1–0	0:0	1:2	—
Guabirá	3:3	**Real Mamoré**	0–2	1–0	–1:+1	—	—
**San José**	4:1	La Paz	3–3	4–1	—	—	—
**Jorge Wilstermann**	4:1	Aurora	3–0	1–1	—	—	—
**Bolívar**	3:3	The Strongest	2–0	0–2	0:0	0:0	4–3

=== Second stage ===
For the second stage, if a tie in points exists after the end of the second leg, the match will go directly into a penalty shootout as per the Laws of the Game.

Teams			Scores		Tie-breaker
Team #1	Points	Team #2	1st leg	2nd leg	Pen.
Real Mamoré	1:4	**Oriente Petrolero**	1–1	0–3	–
**San José**	4:1	The Strongest	0–0	2–1	–
Real Potosí	3:3	**Bolívar**	5–3	1–4	3–5
**Jorge Wilstermann**	3:3	Blooming	2–0	0–3	4–1

=== Semifinals ===
Teams			Scores		Tie-breakers	
Team #1	Points	Team #2	1st leg	2nd leg	Play-off	Pen.
**Oriente Petrolero**	6:0	Jorge Wilstermann	3–1	1–0	—	—
**San José**	3:3	Bolívar	1–0	1–5	2–1	—

=== Finals ===
Teams			Scores		Tie-breakers	
Team #1	Points	Team #2	1st leg	2nd leg	Play-off	Pen.
San José	3:3	**Oriente Petrolero**	2–0	2–5	1–1	5–6

Liga de Fútbol Profesional Boliviano
2010 Torneo Invierno winner

**1st title**

As Oriente Petrolero later qualified for the 2011 Copa Libertadores through the Clausura, San José qualified for the 2011 Copa Sudamericana First Stage.

== Campeonato Clausura ==
The Campeonato Clausura (officially the Campeonato Clausura Entel for sponsorship reasons) will be the second championship of this season.

=== Standings ===
Pos	Team	Pld	W	D	L	GF	GA	GD	Pts	Qualification
1	Oriente Petrolero	22	12	4	6	38	26	+12	40	2011 Copa Libertadores Second Stage
2	Bolívar	22	10	6	6	37	28	+9	36	2011 Copa Libertadores First Stage
3	Aurora	22	10	4	8	34	30	+4	34	2011 Copa Sudamericana Second Stage (Note: Aurora was given the Second Stage spot in the 2011 Copa Sudamericana by the decision of the Bolivian Football Federation.)
4	San José	22	10	4	8	39	37	+2	34	
5	Guabirá	22	9	5	8	22	28	−6	32	
6	Blooming	22	9	4	9	28	26	+2	31	
7	Real Potosí	22	8	5	9	38	35	+3	29	
8	The Strongest	22	10	2	10	37	36	+1	29 (Note: 3 points deducted)	2011 Copa Sudamericana First Stage (Note: The Strongest qualified to Copa Sudamericana as the best 2010 aggregate table among non-champions.)
9	Real Mamoré	22	7	7	8	21	30	−9	28	
10	La Paz	22	7	5	10	33	36	−3	26	
11	Jorge Wilstermann	22	5	7	10	26	32	−6	22	
12	Universitario de Sucre	22	5	7	10	24	33	−9	22	

Rules for classification: 1) points; 2) goal difference; 3) number of goals scored.
Notes:

Liga de Fútbol Profesional Boliviano
2010 Campeonato Clausura champion

4th title

=== Results ===
Home \ Away	AUR	BLO	BOL	GUA	WIL	LPA	OPE	RMA	RPO	SJO	STR	UNI
Aurora		2–1	3–2	1–0	2–2	2–1	2–0	3–0	0–2	4–1	2–1	2–1
Blooming	0–1		2–0	2–3	3–0	2–0	1–0	3–0	2–2	2–2	2–1	2–1
Bolívar	1–0	1–0		4–3	0–0	4–4	2–1	2–2	2–0	0–0	2–2	4–1
Guabirá	1–0	0–0	1–0		2–1	1–0	1–1	0–0	2–0	3–1	2–1	1–0
Jorge Wilstermann	1–0	0–1	0–1	1–1		4–2	4–2	2–0	1–1	1–3	3–1	2–2
La Paz	1–1	4–1	1–3	3–1	1–0		0–0	1–0	1–2	4–3	0–1	1–1
Oriente Petrolero	2–2	1–0	2–4	1–0	3–1	1–0		2–0	3–1	2–1	4–0	3–1
Real Mamoré	2–1	1–1	2–1	0–0	0–0	2–2	3–2		2–1	3–0	1–0	2–0
Real Potosí	2–1	3–0	1–1	4–0	2–1	2–3	1–2	4–0		1–3	3–2	1–1
San José	3–3	2–0	0–1	5–1	2–0	1–0	0–3	1–0	2–3		3–2	2–1
The Strongest	4–2	2–1	3–2	1–0	2–1	1–3	1–1	3–0	4–2	1–2		3–0
Universitario de Sucre	2–0	0–2	1–0	2–0	1–1	3–1	1–2	1–1	1–1	2–2	1–0	

Updated to match(es) played on unknown. Source:
Legend: Blue = home team win; Yellow = draw; Red = away team win.

=== Top goalscorers ===
Pos	Player	Player nationality	Club	Goals
1	William Ferreira	Uruguayan	Bolívar	14
2	Christian Ruiz	Argentine	Real Potosí	11
2	Jose Carlos Santos	Bolivian	Bolívar	11
2	Pablo Vásquez	Argentine	The Strongest	11
3	José Alfredo Castillo	Bolivian	Blooming	10
3	Regis de Souza	Brazilian	San José	10
4	Roberto Galindo	Bolivian	Universitario de Sucre	9
4	Jair Reynoso	Colombian	Aurora	9
5	Carlos Vargas	Bolivian	La Paz	8
6	Augusto Andaveris	Bolivian	Real Potosí	7
6	Ezequiel Juárez	Bolivian	Guabirá	7
6	Juan Maraude	Argentine	Real Mamoré	7

== Relegation ==
Pos	Team	2009 Pts	2010 Pts	Total Pts	Total Pld	Avg	Relegation
1	Bolívar	65	64	129	68	1.897	
2	Oriente Petrolero	54	62	116	68	1.706	
3	Real Potosí	61	45	106	68	1.559	
4	San José	50	52	102	68	1.5	
5	The Strongest	53	48	101	68	1.485	
6	Universitario de Sucre	51	38	89	68	1.309	
7	Guabirá	0	44	44	34	1.294	
8	Aurora	37	51	88	68	1.294	
9	Blooming	45	42	87	68	1.279	
10	La Paz	42	40	82	68	1.206	
11	Real Mamoré	33	40	73	68	1.074	Relegation Playoff Match
12	Jorge Wilstermann	32	40	72	68	1.059	Relegation to the Liga Nacional B

=== Relegation/promotion playoff ===
Team #1	Points	Team #2	1st leg	2nd leg	Playoff
Real América	0:6	Real Mamoré	1–2	3–4	—
