= Diego Terrazas =

Bolivian footballer (born 1987)

Personal information
- Full name: Diego Terrazas Pérez
- Date of birth: February 23, 1987 (age 39)
- Place of birth: Santa Cruz de la Sierra, Bolivia
- Position: Midfielder

Team information
- Current team: Real Potosí
- Number: 16

Senior career*
Years	Team	Apps	(Gls)
2007–2008	Oriente B	29	(8)
2009–2015	Oriente Petrolero	29	(4)
2015–	Real Potosí	1	(0)
- * Club domestic league appearances and goals as of July 7, 2010 ‡ National team caps and goals as of July 12, 2010

Diego Terrazas (born February 23, 1987, in Santa Cruz de la Sierra) is a Bolivian footballer. He currently plays as a midfielder for the Liga de Fútbol Profesional Boliviano side Real Potosí.

== Club career ==
Terrazas joined Oriente B in 2006 at the age of 19, and played 29 games for the team his first year. Following the 2009 season, Terrazas was called by Pablo Sánchez to face the Clausura and Playoff Tournament. In 2010, he scored his 2nd goal in the opening match against Real Mamore.
