= Rodrigo Vargas (footballer, born 1989) =

Bolivian footballer

Personal information
- Full name: Rodrigo Vargas Touchard
- Date of birth: 1 September 1989 (age 37)
- Place of birth: La Paz, Bolivia
- Height: 1.77 m (5 ft 9 1/2 in)
- Position: Midfielder

Team information
- Current team: San José
- Number: 7

Senior career*
Years	Team	Apps	(Gls)
2008–2012	Bolívar	34	(4)
2012–2013	Aurora	36	(6)
2013–2014	Nacional Potosí	40	(12)
2014–2015	Jorge Wilstermann	35	(3)
2015–2019	The Strongest	77	(16)
2020–	San José	23	(8)
- * Club domestic league appearances and goals as of 01:33, 3 January 2021 (UTC)

Rodrigo Vargas Touchard (born 1 September 1989) is a Bolivian professional footballer who plays as a midfielder for Liga de Fútbol Profesional Boliviano club Club San José.

== Career statistics ==
=== Club ===
As of 19 May 2017

Club	Season	League		Cup		Continental		Other		Total	
Club	Season	Apps	Goals	Apps	Goals	Apps	Goals	Apps	Goals	Apps	Goals
Bolívar	2008	14	2	—						14	2
Bolívar	2010	5	1	—						5	1
Bolívar	2011	4	0	—		1	0	—		5	0
Bolívar	2011–12	11	1	—						11	1
Bolívar	Total	34	4	0	0	1	0	0	0	35	4
Aurora	2012–13	36	6	—		2	0	—		38	6
Nacional Potosí	2013–14	40	12	—						40	12
Jorge Wilstermann	2014–15	35	3	—		2	0	—		35	3
The Strongest	2015–16	18	5	—		0	0	—		18	5
The Strongest	2016–17	22	8	—		3	0	—		25	8
The Strongest	Total	40	13	0	0	3	0	0	0	43	13
Total		185	38	0	0	8	0	0	0	193	38
