= Leonardo Zabala =

Bolivian footballer (born 2003)

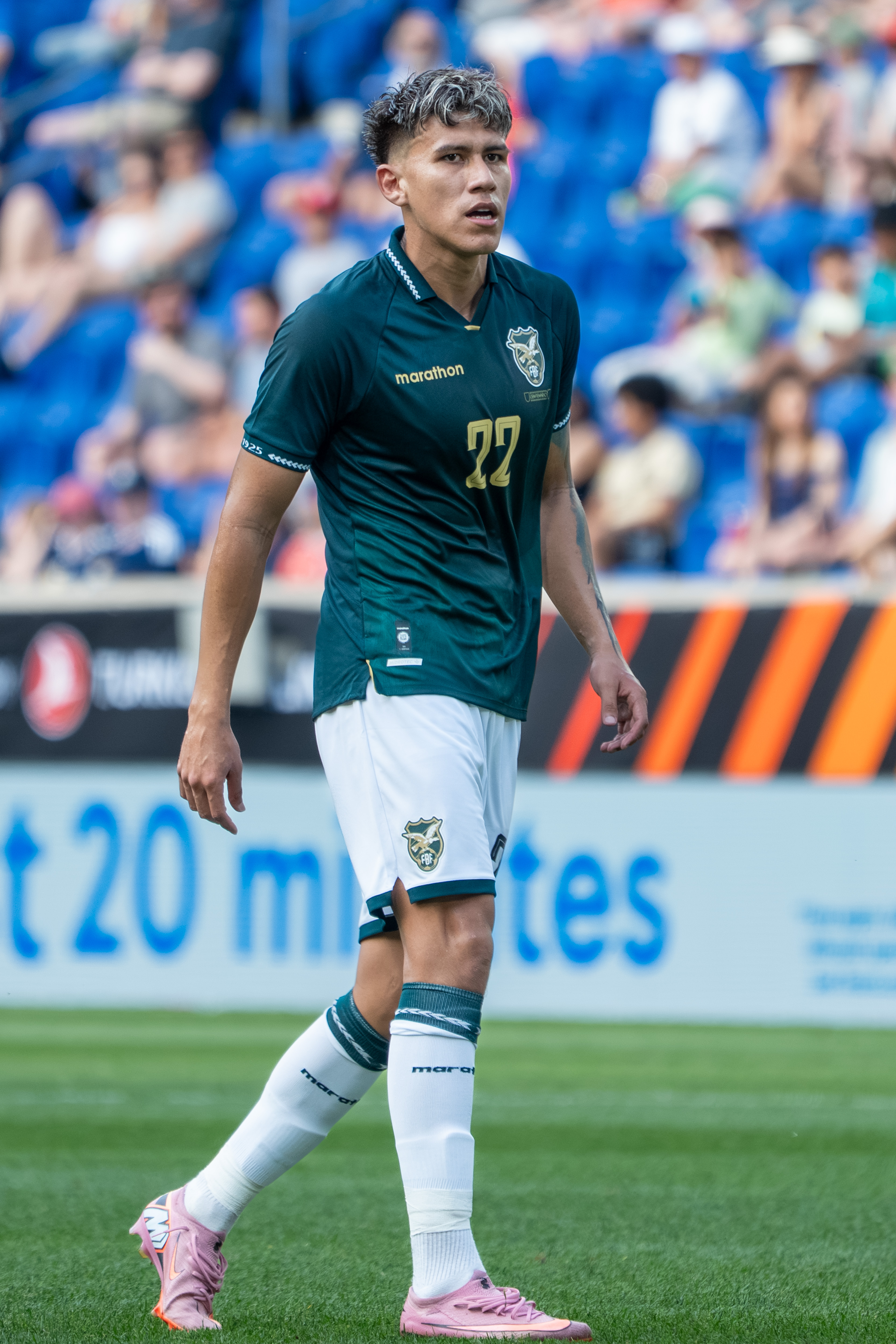
- Zabala with Bolivia in 2026

Personal information
- Full name: Leonardo Yassir Zabala Zeballos
- Date of birth: 23 May 2003 (age 23)
- Place of birth: Santa Cruz de la Sierra, Bolivia
- Height: 1.87 m (6 ft 2 in)
- Position: Centre back

Team information
- Current team: Bolívar (on loan from Cancún)
- Number: 16

Youth career
- 2007–2014: Academía Tahuichi
- 2014–2019: Calleja
- 2019–2021: Palmeiras
- 2021–2023: Santos

Senior career*
Years	Team	Apps	(Gls)
2023–2024	Santos	0	(0)
2024–	Cancún	24	(2)
2026–	→ Bolívar (loan)	3	(0)

International career^{‡}
2019	Bolivia U17	3	(0)
2020	Bolivia U20	3	(0)
2020–	Bolivia	6	(0)
- * Club domestic league appearances and goals as of 14 August 2026 ‡ National team caps and goals as of 6 June 2026

Leonardo Yassir Zabala Zeballos (born 23 May 2003) is a Bolivian football player who plays as central defender for FBF División Profesional club Bolívar, on loan from Liga de Expansión MX club Cancún and for the Bolivia national team.

== Club career ==
Zabala began playing football at the age of four with local side Academía Tahuichi. In September 2019, after representing Club Calleja, he joined Palmeiras after standing out in a local tournament.

On 23 September 2021, Zabala signed a contract with Santos until December 2022, being initially assigned to the under-20s. On 7 June of the following year, he further extended his deal until December 2023.

On 16 March 2023, after already being involved in first team trainings, Zabala further extended his link until the end of 2025. Late in the month, he suffered a knee injury while on international duty, being sidelined for the remainder of the year.

On 25 July 2024, Santos announced that Zabala had left the club after rescinding his contract, and his signature for Liga de Expansión MX side Cancún. He made his senior debut on 17 August, coming on as a late substitute in a 0–0 home draw against Mineros de Zacatecas.

== International career ==
On 9 October 2020, Zabala debuted for the Bolivia national team in a 5-0 2022 FIFA World Cup qualification loss to Brazil.

== Personal life ==
Zabala is the nephew of the Bolivian international footballer Wilder Zabala. He has a son named Theo with a Brazilian woman.

== Career statistics ==
=== International ===
As of 6 June 2026

National team	Year	Competitive		Friendly		Total	
National team	Year	Apps	Goals	Apps	Goals	Apps	Goals
Bolivia	2020	1	0	0	0	1	0
Bolivia	2023	0	0	1	0	1	0
Bolivia	2025	0	0	2	0	2	0
Bolivia	2026	0	0	2	0	2	0
Total		1	0	5	0	6	0
