= Osvaldo Ozzán =

Argentine footballer

Osvaldo Ozzan
Personal information
- Full name: Osvaldo Rafael Ozzan
- Date of birth: 25 January 1970 (age 56)
- Place of birth: Buenos Aires, Argentina
- Height: 1.73 m (5 ft 8 in)
- Positions: Winger; striker

Senior career*
Years	Team	Apps	(Gls)
1989–1991	San Lorenzo	35	(3)
1992	Deportivo Cúcuta	40	(3)
1993	Huachipato	-	
1994	Cobresal	-	
1995–1996	Oriente Petrolero	51	(15)
1997	Deportivo Quito	32	(3)
1998–1999	Blooming	21	(3)
2000–2001	Real Santa Cruz	38	(8)
2002	Guabirá	26	(5)
2003	Unión Central	24	(4)
- * Club domestic league appearances and goals

Osvaldo Rafael Ozzan (born January 25, 1970, in Buenos Aires) is a former Argentine football winger and striker who played at professional level for San Lorenzo in Argentina, Huachipato and Cobresal in Chile, Oriente Petrolero, Blooming, Guabirá and Unión Central in Bolivia, Deportivo Cúcuta in Colombia and Deportivo Quito in Ecuador.
