= Ramiro Fassi =

Argentine footballer

Personal information
- Full name: Ramiro Fernando Fassi
- Date of birth: April 21, 1982 (age 44)
- Place of birth: Santa Fe Province, Argentina
- Height: 1.79 m (5 ft 10 in)
- Position: Defender

Senior career*
Years	Team	Apps	(Gls)
2002–2010	Rosario Central	73	(0)
2007	→ Sporting Cristal (loan)	29	(0)
2008–2009	→ Quilmes	29	(2)
2010	→ Oriente Petrolero (loan)	5	(0)
2010–2012	Platense		
2012–2013	Temperley	21	(0)
2013–2014	Defensores de Belgrano	19	(0)
2014–2015	Tiro Federal	6	(0)
- * Club domestic league appearances and goals as of 13 April 2015

Ramiro Fernando Fassi (born April 21, 1982) is an Argentine footballer. His position is central defender.

Fassi debuted in 2002 playing for Rosario Central, where he grew footballing club. Ángel Tulio Zof coach put him as owner in 2004.

When Néstor Gorosito took the managerial position at Central, Fassi was no longer an option for the team, and left on a one-year loan to Sporting Cristal from Peru, where he became a starter scoring a league goal. In 2009, he signed with Oriente Petrolero for 1 year.
