= Gabriel Aguilar =

Bolivian footballer (born 1987)

Personal information
- Full name: Juan Gabriel Aguilar Osinaga
- Date of birth: 15 March 1987 (age 39)
- Place of birth: Cotoca, Santa Cruz, Bolivia
- Height: 1.65 m (5 ft 5 in)
- Position: Defender

Senior career*
Years	Team	Apps	(Gls)
2006	San José		
2006–2011	Oriente Petrolero		
2011–2012	Universitario Sucre		
2012–	Nacional Potosí		
- * Club domestic league appearances and goals

Juan Gabriel Aguilar Osinaga (born 15 March 1987) is a Bolivian professional footballer who plays as a defender for Oriente Petrolero.

== Biography ==
Aguilar was born in Cotoca. He holds a bachelor's degree in humanities and this year he obtained his degree in Business Administration with a specialization in Sports Management from the Washington University in St. Louis (D-USA).

== Club career ==
Gabriel Aguilar made his professional debut on 10 June 2006 with Oriente Petrolero vs San José de Oruro in Ramón Tahuichi Aguilera Stadium in Santa Cruz de la Sierra, having come up through the Oriente Petrolero youth system.

In 2007, Aguilar was selected to represent Bolivia in the Under-20 division of the 2007 Pan American Games. In 2006, he was selected for the Bolivian Under-20 team to compete in the "Youth of America" championship in Paraguay.

Skills and technical strengths: • Leadership • Dexterity • High performance • Competitiveness • Orderly and precise in the game • Defense impeccable • Overflow of balance with the opposing team is on the left or right lane.

Mr. Gabriel Aguilar, is considered one of the best soccer players in Bolivia for its multipurpose function as left and right side defense. As compared to Ex-Real Madrid, the Brazilian star "Cicinho"

In 2010, Mr Aguilar and Sports Club Oriente Petrolero became National Champions LPFB.

Mr. Aguilar, in July 2011, incorporated to Club Universitario de Sucre.

== Recognition and awards ==
1. Named "Best Player" of 2006 by the Cruceña Football Association (ACF) Bolivia
2. Victoria Alada Prize: awarded by the Secretary of Sports to the Best Footballer, 2007
3. Finalist, Copa Aerosur, 2007
4. Finalist, LFPB National Tournament Playoffs, 2009
5. Finalist, LFPB National Tournament Opening Round, 2010
6. Champion, LFPB National Winter Tournament, 2010
7. Champion, LFPB National Tournament Closing Round, 2010

His calm ball-handling, strong technique and his burst down the right sideline led his teammate Thiago Leitao to christen [Aguilar] "Cicinho", because his style is reminiscent of the Brazilian Real Madrid player.
