= Lorgio Suárez =

Bolivian footballer (born 1990)

Personal information
- Full name: Ronald Lorgio Suárez Saucedo
- Date of birth: 5 December 1990 (age 35)
- Place of birth: Santa Cruz de la Sierra, Bolivia
- Height: 1.83 m (6 ft 0 in)
- Position: Defender

Youth career
- 1997–2007: Academia Tahuichi
- 2008: Universidad de Chile
- 2009: Oriente Petrolero

Senior career*
Years	Team	Apps	(Gls)
2008	Calleja	–	(–)
2009–2010	Oriente Petrolero	49	(0)
2011	Blooming	22	(0)
2012–2013	Guabirá		
2013–2014	Sport Boys Warnes	8	(0)
2014–2015	Guabirá		
2015–2016	Real América		
2016	San José	6	(0)
2019	Real Brígida	–	(–)
2020	Ciclón de Tarija		
2020	Torre Fuerte		
2020	Real Brígida	–	(–)

International career
2005–2007	Bolivia U15	7	(1)
2007	Bolivia U17	8	(2)
2009	Bolivia U20	4	(0)
2011	Bolivia	1	(0)
- * Club domestic league appearances and goals as of 1 June 2025

Ronald Lorgio Suárez Saucedo (born 5 December 1990 in Santa Cruz de la Sierra) commonly known as Lorgio Suarez, is a Bolivian former professional footballer who played as a centre back. He has also appeared for and captained the Bolivian national U-15, U-17 and U-20 teams.

== Career ==
Suárez began his career at Ramón Tahuichi Aguilera's football academy. In February 2008, while playing in an international tournament with Tahuichi, he was spotted by talent scouts who recruited him for Universidad de Chile, where he spent 10 months training in the youth team. The following year, after the 2009 South American U-20 Championship, he returned to Bolivia and signed for his hometown club Oriente Petrolero. He showed good form, and was included in the starting line-up by coach Gustavo Quinteros, winning a league title the following season, which enabled him to play in the Copa Sudamericana. In December 2010, after Quinteros had departed to coach the national team, he resigned his contract and joined Blooming, arriving alongside goalkeeper Sergio Galarza.

In October 2020, Suárez joined Torre Fuerte for the Copa Simón Bolívar.

Suárez earned caps for Bolivia in the U-15, U-17 and served as captain in the U-20 level. However, he has not yet appeared for the Bolivia national team.

== Honours ==
Oriente Petrolero

- Primera División (1): 2010
