= Wilder Zabala =

Bolivian footballer (born 1982)

Personal information
- Date of birth: 31 December 1982 (age 43)
- Place of birth: Santa Cruz de la Sierra, Bolivia
- Position: Defender

Team information
- Current team: Universitario de Sucre
- Number: 13

Senior career*
Years	Team	Apps	(Gls)
2002–2004	Real Potosí	108	(8)
2005–2008	Blooming	61	(0)
2009	Oriente Petrolero	31	(1)
2010	Blooming	36	(0)
2011–2014	Oriente Petrolero	97	(3)
2014–2015	San José	30	(3)
2015–	Universitario de Sucre	8	(0)

International career^{‡}
2009	Bolivia	2	(0)
- * Club domestic league appearances and goals as of 21 September 2011 ‡ National team caps and goals as of 21 September 2011

Wilder Zabala (born 31 December 1982) is a Bolivian international footballer who plays for Oriente Petrolero, as a defender.

== Club career ==
Zabala has played for Real Potosí, Blooming and Oriente Petrolero.

== International career ==
He made his international debut for Bolivia in 2009, and has played in FIFA World Cup qualifying matches.

== Personal life ==
Zabala is the uncle of the Bolivian international footballer Leonardo Zabala.
