= Ronald Rea =

Bolivian footballer (born 1988)

Personal information
- Full name: Ronald Rea Romero
- Date of birth: 29 March 1988 (age 38)
- Place of birth: Santa Cruz de la Sierra, Bolivia
- Position: Midfielder

Team information
- Current team: Sport Boys

Youth career
- ?–2010: Oriente Petrolero

Senior career*
Years	Team	Apps	(Gls)
2010–2011	Oriente Petrolero	23	(0)
2011–2012	Bolívar	7	(1)
2013–2014	Blooming	1	(0)
2014–	Sport Boys	15	(1)
- * Club domestic league appearances and goals as of 1 September 2010 ‡ National team caps and goals as of 16 September 2010

Ronald Rea Romero (born 29 March 1988) is a Bolivian footballer who plays for Bolivian club Oriente Petrolero.He is a midfielder.

== Club career ==
Rea was signed by Oriente Petrolero in January 2010, from Bolivian academy Tahuichi Academy. He played for Oriente reserves for 1 year in 2010 he was called by Gustavo Quinteros to join the first team. He made he debut on in a match against Real Potosi. His first goal was against Real Mamore in the Apertura 2010, and his first international goal was against Universidad de Chile the match ended 2-2.
