= Hugo Suárez =

Bolivian footballer (born 1982)

Personal information
- Full name: Hugo Suárez Vaca
- Date of birth: February 7, 1982 (age 44)
- Place of birth: Santa Cruz de la Sierra, Bolivia
- Height: 1.81 m (5 ft 11 in)
- Position: Goalkeeper

Youth career
- 1994–2000: Tahuichi Academy

Senior career*
Years	Team	Apps	(Gls)
2001–2002	Real Santa Cruz	0	(0)
2004–2009	Wilstermann	125	(6)
2008	→ Real Potosí (loan)	31	(0)
2010–2012	Oriente Petrolero	47	(1)
2012–2014	Wilstermann	59	(3)
2014–2018	Blooming	121	(1)
2019–2020	Wilstermann	6	(0)

International career^{‡}
2001	Bolivia U-20	6	(0)
2006–2014	Bolivia	13	(0)
- * Club domestic league appearances and goals as of June 4, 2015 ‡ National team caps and goals as of June 4, 2015

Hugo Suárez Vaca (born February 7, 1982, in Santa Cruz de la Sierra) is a Bolivian footballer who plays goalkeeper for Wilstermann in the Liga de Fútbol Profesional Boliviano.

During his professional career he also played for Real Santa Cruz, Wilstermann in three periods, Real Potosí and Oriente Petrolero.

He has been capped for the Bolivia national team 13 times.
