= Lincoln (footballer, born 1983) =

Brazilian footballer

Personal information
- Full name: Abraão Lincoln Martins
- Date of birth: 14 June 1983 (age 43)
- Place of birth: Brazil
- Height: 1.85 m (6 ft 1 in)
- Position: Striker

Youth career
- Paulista

Senior career*
Years	Team	Apps	(Gls)
2002	Paulista		
2003	Taubaté		
2004–2006	Paulista		
2007	Avispa Fukuoka	39	(16)
2008	Shonan Bellmare	16	(5)
2009	Paulista		
2009	Shonan Bellmare	9	(1)
2010	Oriente Petrolero		
2011–2012	Thespa Kusatsu	38	(8)
2013	Brasiliense		
2014	Votuporanguense	5	(0)
2015	Juventus-SP	9	(2)
- * Club domestic league appearances and goals

Abraão Lincoln Martins, or simply Lincoln (born 14 June 1983), is a Brazilian former football striker.

== Club statistics ==
Club performance			League		Cup		Total	
Season	Club	League	Apps	Goals	Apps	Goals	Apps	Goals
Japan			League		Emperor's Cup		Total	
2007	Avispa Fukuoka	J2 League	39	16	1	2	40	18
2008	Shonan Bellmare	J2 League	16	5	0	0	16	5
2009	Shonan Bellmare	J2 League	9	1	1	0	10	1
Country	Japan		64	22	2	2	66	24
Total			64	22	2	2	66	24
