= Pablo Salinas =

Bolivian footballer (born 1979)

Personal information
- Full name: Pablo Antonio Salinas Menchaca
- Date of birth: August 7, 1979 (age 47)
- Place of birth: Santa Cruz de la Sierra, Bolivia
- Height: 1.68 m (5 ft 6 in)
- Position: Forward

Team information
- Current team: Club Destroyers

Senior career*
Years	Team	Apps	(Gls)
2002	Blooming	3	(0)
2003	→ Real Potosí (loan)	32	(13)
2004	Blooming	41	(4)
2005–2006	Wilstermann	52	(11)
2007	The Strongest	36	(13)
2008	Bolívar	21	(8)
2009	Wilstermann	28	(4)
2010	Oriente Petrolero	20	(6)
2010–2011	Deportes Quindío	28	(4)
2011–2012	San José	22	(8)
2012–2013	Wilstermann	39	(13)
2013–2017	Blooming	128	(31)
2017–	Club Destroyers	?	(?)

International career
2006–2008	Bolivia	3	(0)
- * Club domestic league appearances and goals as of 27 November 2017

Pablo Antonio Salinas Menchaca (born 7 August 1979 in Santa Cruz de la Sierra) is a Bolivian football forward who currently plays for Club Destroyers.

== Career ==
Salinas played for Categoría Primera A side Deportes Quindío, where he became the first Bolivian player to score a goal for the Colombian club in 2010.

== National team ==
Salinas made his debut for the Bolivia national team on 15 November 2006 in a friendly match against El Salvador (5–1), as a substitute for goal scorer Nelson Sossa. He has 3 appearances for Bolivia.
