= Ronny Montero =

Bolivian footballer (born 1991)

Personal information
- Full name: Ronny Fernando Montero Martínez
- Date of birth: May 15, 1991 (age 35)
- Place of birth: Santa Cruz de la Sierra, Bolivia
- Height: 1.89 m (6 ft 2 in)
- Position: Centre back

Team information
- Current team: Independiente Petrolero
- Number: 16

Senior career*
Years	Team	Apps	(Gls)
2010–2016	Oriente Petrolero	72	(1)
2016–2017	Club Petrolero	16	(0)
2017	Real Potosí	14	(0)
2018–2022	Wilstermann	98	(6)
2023	Palmaflor	18	(0)
2024–2025	Guabirá	17	(0)
2025–2026	Real Tomayapo	11	(0)
2026–	Independiente Petrolero	0	(0)

International career^{‡}
2011	Bolivia U20	0	(0)
2018–	Bolivia	5	(0)
- * Club domestic league appearances and goals as of 22:33, 12 March 2026 (UTC) ‡ National team caps and goals as of 12:57, 26 January 2022 (UTC)

Ronny Montero (born 15 May 1991) is a Bolivian footballer who plays for Bolivian Primera División club Independiente Petrolero.

== Club career ==
Montero C.D. Jorge Wilstermann in 2018 and won two national titles with the club prior to agreeing a new contract with the club in 2021. Montero joined Palmaflor ahead of the 2023 season.

== Style of play ==
He is known on FIFA 23 for having the slowest pace in the Ultimate Team game, with 28.

== International career ==
Montero made his senior international debut for the Bolivia national football team on 13 October 2018 during a 3–0 victory over Myanmar at the Thuwanna YTC Stadium.

== Titles ==
- (Bolivia) Oriente Petrolero 2010 (Torneo Clausura Bolivian Primera División)
- (Bolivia) Wilstermann 2018 (Torneo Apertura Bolivian Primera División)
- (Bolivia) Wilstermann 2019 (Torneo Clausura Bolivian Primera División)
