= Miguel Ángel Hoyos =

Bolivian footballer (born 1981)

Miguel Hoyos
Personal information
- Full name: Miguel Ángel Hoyos Guzmán
- Date of birth: March 11, 1981 (age 45)
- Place of birth: Santa Cruz de la Sierra, Bolivia
- Height: 1.75 m (5 ft 9 in)
- Position: Right back

Team information
- Current team: Nacional Potosí
- Number: 2

Senior career*
Years	Team	Apps	(Gls)
2001–2008	Oriente Petrolero	211	(18)
2007	→ The Strongest (loan)	36	(6)
2009	Bolívar	29	(2)
2010	Hapoel Tel Aviv	0	(0)
2010–2014	Oriente Petrolero	156	(21)
2014–2015	Sport Boys Warnes	15	(0)
2015–2016	San José	24	(2)
2016	Universitario Sucre	10	(0)
2017–2018	Nacional Potosí	4	(2)

International career^{‡}
2002–2011	Bolivia	28	(1)
- * Club domestic league appearances and goals as of 1 June 2016 ‡ National team caps and goals as of 1 June 2011

Miguel Ángel Hoyos Guzmán (born March 11, 1981, in Santa Cruz de la Sierra) in a Bolivian former football defender who last played for Nacional Potosí.

== Club career ==
Hoyos began his career with hometown club Oriente Petrolero where he played as a starter between 2002 and 2006. The following year he went to The Strongest on a loan. In 2008, he returned to Oriente to play for another season. Subsequently, Hoyos awoke the interest of popular club Bolívar and he agreed to join the team for the 2009 season, on 21 September 2009 he was suspended after testing positive for dexamethasone in an anti-doping test. He signed for Israeli side Hapoel Tel Aviv on 22 January 2010, but on 26 January 2010 just 4 days after he signed for club the team decided to release him. On 2 February he signed for Bolivian side Oriente Petrolero again.

=== Doping case ===
Hoyos was tested positive for use of a banned substance after a national team game against Venezuela in June 2009, in which game he clashed heads with Ronald García. He was cleared to play again by CONMEBOL in October 2009 after it was declared the injection used was aimed to help ease the sustained head injury.

== International career ==
Hoyos has earned a total of 28 caps for the Bolivia national team with one goal scored between 2002 and 2011. He represented his country in 9 FIFA World Cup qualification matches.

=== International goals ===
Scores and results list Bolivia's goal tally first.

No	Date	Venue	Opponent	Score	Result	Competition
1.	26 May 2007	Gillette Stadium, Foxborough, Massachusetts	Republic of Ireland	1–1	1–1	Friendly

== Honours ==
=== Club ===
- Oriente Petrolero
  - Liga de Fútbol Profesional Boliviano: 2004 (C)
- Bolívar
  - Liga de Fútbol Profesional Boliviano: 2009 (A)
