= Alan Loras =

Bolivian footballer (born 1986)

Personal information
- Full name: Alan Loras Veléz
- Date of birth: July 4, 1986 (age 40)
- Place of birth: Trinidad, Bolivia
- Height: 1.79 m (5 ft 10 in)
- Position: Centre back

Team information
- Current team: Atlético Palmaflor
- Number: 16

Youth career
- 2002–2005: Real Mamoré

Senior career*
| Years | Team | Apps | (Gls) |
| 2006–2009 | Real Mamoré | | |
| 2009–2010 | San José | 49 | (2) |
| 2010–2012 | Real Mamoré | 42 | (0) |
| 2012–2016 | Universitario de Sucre | 151 | (3) |
| 2016 | Blooming | 8 | (0) |
| 2017 | Club Quebracho | | |
| 2018–2019 | Royal Pari | 57 | (1) |
| 2020– | Atlético Palmaflor | 20 | (0) |
- * Club domestic league appearances and goals as of 23:49, 21 December 2020 (UTC)

Alan Loras (born July 4, 1986) is a Bolivian football defender who plays for Club Atlético Palmaflor in the Liga de Fútbol Profesional Boliviano.
