= Juan Salaberry =

Uruguayan footballer (born 1980)

Personal information
- Full name: Juan Daniel Salaberry Brum
- Date of birth: 7 February 1980 (age 46)
- Place of birth: Salto, Uruguay
- Height: 1.80 m (5 ft 11 in)
- Position: Midfielder

Senior career*
Years	Team	Apps	(Gls)
2005–2007	Universitario de Sucre	28	(6)
2007–2008	Deportivo Cali	14	(2)
2008–2009	PSMS Medan	8	(1)
2009–2010	Jorge Wilstermann	36	(10)
- * Club domestic league appearances and goals as of 29 November 2010

Juan Daniel Salaberry Brum (born February 7, 1980, in Salto, Uruguay) is a Uruguayan former footballer.
