= Alcides Peña =

Bolivian footballer (born 1989)

Personal information
- Full name: Alcides Peña Jiménez
- Date of birth: 14 January 1989 (age 37)
- Place of birth: Santa Cruz de la Sierra, Bolivia
- Height: 1.75 m (5 ft 9 in)
- Position: Striker

Team information
- Current team: Real Santa Cruz
- Number: 7

Youth career
- 2001–2006: Oriente Petrolero

Senior career*
Years	Team	Apps	(Gls)
2006–2016	Oriente Petrolero	264	(78)
2016–2017	Atlético Bucaramanga	12	(1)
2017	Oriente Petrolero	8	(3)
2019	Sport Boys Warnes	13	(3)
2020–	Real Santa Cruz	5	(0)

International career
2009	Bolivia U20	4	(0)
2010–2015	Bolivia	16	(1)
- * Club domestic league appearances and goals as of 19:08, 1 September 2020 (UTC)

Alcides Peña Jiménez (born 14 January 1989) is a Bolivian footballer who plays for Real Santa Cruz as a striker.

== Club career ==
He enrolled in the Oriente Petrolero and began developing his football skills at age twelve. In 2006, Peña began his pro-career with hometown club Oriente Petrolero after being spotted by Víctor Hugo Antelo, the team manager at that time.

In June 2016, Peña was loaned to Colombian club Atlético Bucaramanga.

== International career ==
Peña made his debut for Bolivia in 2010, and has played in FIFA World Cup qualification matches.
