= Danilo Peinado =

Uruguayan footballer (born 1985)

Personal information
- Full name: Danilo Javier Peinado Lerena
- Date of birth: 15 February 1985 (age 41)
- Place of birth: Montevideo, Uruguay
- Height: 1.81 m (5 ft 11 in)
- Position: Forward

Team information
- Current team: Legnago Salus

Senior career*
Years	Team	Apps	(Gls)
2002–2007	Defensor Sporting	68	(13)
2007–2008	Montevideo Wanderers	16	(7)
2008–2009	Liverpool FC	20	(4)
2009	Montevideo Wanderers	13	(5)
2010	Olimpia	6	(0)
2010	Oriente Petrolero	17	(6)
2011	Montevideo Wanderers	5	(0)
2011–2012	Recreativo	6	(0)
2012–2013	Bella Vista	8	(0)
2013	Beijing BIT	29	(16)
2014	Wuhan Zall	12	(3)
2014	Guangdong Sunray Cave	15	(3)
2014–2015	Oriente Petrolero		
2015	Montevideo Wanderers		
2015–2016	CF Vilaseca B		
2016	UD Jesús y María		
2017	Águila		
2017–	Legnago Salus	14	(5)
- * Club domestic league appearances and goals as of 13 February 2018

Danilo Javier Peinado Lorena (Spanish pronunciation: [daˈnilo pejˈnaðo]; born 15 February 1985) is a Uruguayan professional footballer who plays as a forward for Italian club Legnago Salus.

== Career ==
Peinado was born in Montevideo. He has played locally for Defensor Sporting and Montevideo Wanderers. He also played for Olimpia in the Paraguayan Primera División and Oriente Petrolero in the Liga de Fútbol Profesional Boliviano.

In August 2011, Peinado was transferred to Segunda División club Recreativo de Huelva.

On 8 January 2014, Peinado transferred to China League One side Wuhan Zall. On 18 July 2014, Peinado transferred to China League One side Guangdong Sunray Cave.
