= Maximiliano Andrada =

Argentine footballer

Personal information
- Full name: Maximiliano Gabriel Andrada
- Date of birth: 5 October 1985 (age 41)
- Place of birth: Rosario, Argentina
- Height: 1.70 m (5 ft 7 in)
- Position: Midfielder

Senior career*
Years	Team	Apps	(Gls)
–2009	Nacional Potosí		
2010	Club Jorge Wilstermann		
2011–2012	Club San José		
2012–2013	Club Jorge Wilstermann		
2013–2014	Club Real Potosí		
2014–2015	Sport Boys Warnes		
2015–2016	Club Atlético Ciclón		
- * Club domestic league appearances and goals

Maximiliano Andrada (born 5 October 1985) is a retired Argentine football defender.
