= Carlos Tordoya =

Bolivian football defender (born 1987)

Personal information
- Full name: Carlos Hugo Tordoya Pizarro
- Date of birth: July 31, 1987 (age 39)
- Place of birth: Santa Cruz de la Sierra, Bolivia
- Height: 1.83 m (6 ft 0 in)
- Position: Defender

Team information
- Current team: Real Potosí

Youth career
- 1999–2005: Tahuichi Academy
- 2006: → Arsenal de Sarandí (loan)

Senior career*
| Years | Team | Apps | (Gls) |
| 2006 | → Arsenal de Sarandí (loan) | 0 | (0) |
| 2007–2009 | Bolívar | 49 | (2) |
| 2009 | Cobreloa | 7 | (0) |
| 2010 | Aurora | 42 | (1) |
| 2011–2012 | Guabirá | 34 | (2) |
| 2012–2013 | San José | 29 | (2) |
| 2013–2014 | Wilstermann | 31 | (1) |
| 2014–2016 | Blooming | 62 | (1) |
| 2016–2017 | Nacional Potosí | 22 | (3) |
| 2017–2018 | Real América | ? | (?) |
| 2018–2019 | Royal Pari | 5 | (1) |
| 2019– | Real Potosí | 10 | (1) |

International career
| 2007 | Bolivia U-20 | 3 | (0) |
| 2007 | Bolivia | 1 | (0) |
- * Club domestic league appearances and goals as of 16 March 2019

Carlos Hugo Tordoya Pizarro (born 31 July 1987 in Santa Cruz de la Sierra) is a Bolivian football defender who plays for Real Potosí in the Liga de Fútbol Profesional Boliviano.

== Career ==
Tordoya began his football career at a young age attending the prestigious Tahuichi Academy. In 2006, he was loaned to Argentine club Arsenal de Sarandí where he played in the reserve team. After one year in Argentina, he returned to his home country and signed with popular club Bolívar. Playing for Bolívar Tordoya won the 2009 Apertura tournament, and then he was transferred on loan to Chilean club Cobreloa. He made his debut in the Primera División de Chile on July 19, 2009, in a 2–1 victory over Ñublense. After only making 7 appearances for the zorros, he returned to Bolivia signing for Aurora in 2010. The following season, he joined Guabirá.

== Club titles ==
| Season | Club | Title |
|---|---|---|
| 2009 (A) | Bolívar | Liga de Fútbol Profesional Boliviano |
