= Juan Maraude =

Argentine footballer

Personal information
- Full name: Juan Alberto Maraude
- Date of birth: 11 January 1981 (age 45)
- Place of birth: Resistencia, Argentina
- Height: 1.70 m (5 ft 7 in)
- Position: Forward

Team information
- Current team: Municipal Tarija (manager)

Senior career*
Years	Team	Apps	(Gls)
1997	Chaco For Ever		
1998–1999	Argentino de Rosario		
2000–2002	Rosario Central	0	(0)
2002–2003	Royal Obrero		
2004	Atlético Bermejo		
2005	Royal Obrero		
2006	Ciclón		(15)
2007	Real Mamoré		
2008	Oriente Petrolero	29	(9)
2009	Alianza Atlético	27	(5)
2010–2011	Real Mamoré		
2011	San José	5	(0)
2012	Ciclón		
2012–2014	Guabirá		
2014	Ciclón		
2016	Avilés Industrial		
2018	Ciclón		

Managerial career
- 2016: Avilés Industrial
- 2016: Estudiantes Chiquiacá
- 2017: Royal Obrero
- 2019–2021: García Agreda
- 2022–: Municipal Tarija
- * Club domestic league appearances and goals

Juan Alberto Maraude (born 11 January 1981) is an Argentine football manager and former forward. He is the current manager of the Bolivian club Municipal Tarija.

Maraude was twice the top goalscorer on Bolivia's first tier, achieving this in the 2007 Clausura and the 2011 Torneo. His son Jesús Maraude is also a professional footballer.
