= Nicolás Suárez (Bolivian footballer) =

Bolivian footballer and manager (born 1978)

Personal information
- Full name: Nicolás Suárez Vaca
- Date of birth: December 23, 1978 (age 47)
- Place of birth: Santa Ana del Yacuma, Bolivia
- Height: 1.80 m (5 ft 11 in)
- Position: Defender

Senior career*
Years	Team	Apps	(Gls)
1997–1999	Guabirá		
2000	Blooming		
2001	Guabirá		
2002–2009	Real Potosí		
2010	Oriente Petrolero		
2011–2012	San José	39	(0)
2012–2013	Wilstermann	25	(0)
2013	Guabirá	6	(0)
2014–2015	Universitario de Pando		

International career
1999–2007	Bolivia	5	(0)

Managerial career
- 2019: San José (reserves)
- 2019: Real Potosí
- * Club domestic league appearances and goals

Nicolás Suárez Vaca (born December 23, 1978, in Santa Ana del Yacuma) is a Bolivian football defender and manager.

== National team ==
Suárez made his debut for the Bolivia national team on November 3, 1999, in a friendly match against Paraguay, as a substitute for Gonzalo Galindo.

== Coaching career ==
In April 2019, Suárez returned to Club Real Potosí to manage the club's reserve team. On 9 August 2019, Suárez was appointed manager of his former club Club Real Potosí. Due to bad results, he was fired on 8 October 2019.
