= Omar Morales (footballer, born 1988) =

Bolivian footballer (born 1988)

Personal information
- Full name: Omar Jesús Morales Paz
- Date of birth: January 18, 1988 (age 38)
- Place of birth: Tarija, Bolivia
- Height: 1.75 m (5 ft 9 in)
- Position: Right back

Senior career*
Years	Team	Apps	(Gls)
2007–2013	Blooming	80	(3)
2013–2015	Petrolero	41	(8)
2015–2016	Wilstermann	38	(9)
2016	Sport Boys	15	(0)
2017–2019	Wilstermann	21	(2)

International career^{‡}
2007	Bolivia U-20	2	(0)
2017–	Bolivia	1	(0)
- * Club domestic league appearances and goals as of August 13, 2015 ‡ National team caps and goals as of March 27, 2018

Omar Jesús Morales Paz (born January 18, 1988, in Tarija) is a Bolivian football defender who currently plays for Wilstermann in the Liga de Fútbol Profesional Boliviano.

== International ==
He was called to play for Bolivia in the 2007 South American U-20 Championship held in Paraguay.

Morales was named in Bolivia's provisional squad for Copa América Centenario but was cut from the final squad.

== Club titles ==
Season	Club	Title
2009 (C)	Blooming	Liga de Fútbol Profesional Boliviano
