= Julio César Cortez =

Bolivian footballer (born 1981)

Personal information
- Full name: Julio César Cortez Ávalos
- Date of birth: February 10, 1981 (age 45)
- Place of birth: Santa Cruz de la Sierra, Bolivia
- Height: 1.75 m (5 ft 9 in)
- Position: Midfielder

Team information
- Current team: Universitario de Beni

Senior career*
Years	Team	Apps	(Gls)
1999–2004	Blooming	154	(12)
2004–2005	La Paz	41	(14)
2005–2006	Bizertin	0	(0)
2006–2007	The Strongest	1	(0)
2007–2008	La Paz	38	(4)
2008	Standard Baku	3	(1)
2009–2010	Real Mamoré	35	(9)
2011	Universitario de Sucre	12	(3)
2012–2013	Petrolero	19	(1)
2014–	Universitario de Beni		

International career
2001	Bolivia U-20	3	(1)
- * Club domestic league appearances and goals as of 3 February 2015

Julio César Cortez Ávalos (born February 10, 1981) is a Bolivian footballer who currently plays for Universitario de Beni.
