= Víctor Hugo Melgar =

Bolivian footballer (born 1988)

Personal information
- Full name: Víctor Hugo Melgar Bejarano
- Date of birth: 28 February 1988 (age 38)
- Place of birth: Tarija, Bolivia
- Height: 1.71 m (5 ft 7 in)
- Position: Midfielder

Team information
- Current team: Always Ready
- Number: 6

Senior career*
Years	Team	Apps	(Gls)
2010–2011	Wilstermann	18	(1)
2012–2013	Blooming	39	(1)
2013–2015	The Strongest	32	(1)
2015–2017	Universitario de Sucre	91	(4)
2018	San José	37	(5)
2019	Wilstermann	26	(1)
2020–	Always Ready	8	(1)
- * Club domestic league appearances and goals as of 02:53, 3 January 2021 (UTC)

Víctor Hugo Melgar (born February 28, 1988, in Tarija, Bolivia) is a Bolivian footballer currently playing for Universitario de Sucre.
