= Enrique Romaña =

Colombian footballer (born 1988)

Personal information
- Full name: Enrique Romaña
- Date of birth: December 28, 1988 (age 37)
- Place of birth: Colombia
- Position: Defender

Team information
- Current team: Millonarios

Senior career*
Years	Team	Apps	(Gls)
2007–2009	Millonarios	65	(19)
2010–present	La Paz	1	(1)
- * Club domestic league appearances and goals as of 27 March 2008

Enrique Romaña (born December 28, 1988), is a Colombian football defender, who plays for La Paz F.C. in Bolivia.

== Club career ==
He previously played for Millonarios in the Copa Mustang. Romaña is a product of the Millonarios youth system and played with the Millonarios first team from November 2007 to March 2010.
