= Gilberto Palacios =

Paraguayan footballer (born 1980)

Personal information
- Full name: Gilberto Ramón Palacios Acosta
- Date of birth: 8 January 1980 (age 46)
- Place of birth: Asunción, Paraguay
- Height: 1.76 m (5 ft 9 in)
- Position: Striker

Youth career
- Olimpia

Senior career*
| Years | Team | Apps | (Gls) |
| 1998–2004 | Olimpia | 75 | (20) |
| 2004 | 12 de Octubre | 11 | (2) |
| 2005 | 3 de Febrero | 17 | (8) |
| 2005 | Olimpo | 1 | (0) |
| 2006–2007 | Tacuary | 56 | (21) |
| 2007–2008 | Olimpia | 20 | (2) |
| 2008–2009 | Guaraní | 22 | (8) |
| 2009 | Universidad Católica | 6 | (0) |
| 2010 | Oriente Petrolero | 15 | (3) |
| 2010 | Sportivo Luqueño | 7 | (1) |
| Total | | 230 | (65) |
- * Club domestic league appearances and goals

Gilberto Ramón Palacios Acosta (born 8 January 1980) is a Paraguayan former footballer who played as a striker.

== Career ==
Palacios began playing football with local side Club Olimpia. He won the league with Olimpia from 1998 to 2000 (as the club won four successive league titles).

He has played professional football in Paraguay, Argentina, Chile and Bolivia.
