= Éder Jordan =

Bolivian footballer (born 1985)

Personal information
- Full name: Éder Jordan Pereyra
- Date of birth: June 17, 1985 (age 41)
- Place of birth: Santa Cruz de la Sierra, Bolivia
- Position: Goalkeeper

Team information
- Current team: Sport Boys
- Number: 32

Senior career*
Years	Team	Apps	(Gls)
2010	The Strongest	43	(0)
2011–2012	Nacional Potosí	24	(0)
2012–2014	Real Potosí	32	(0)
2014–2015	Blooming	12	(0)
2015–2017	Real Potosí	60	(0)
2018	Universitario de Sucre	9	(0)
2019	Always Ready	8	(0)
2019–	Sport Boys	0	(0)
- * Club domestic league appearances and goals as of 16:04, 28 October 2019 (UTC)

Éder Jordan Pereyra (born June 17, 1985, in Santa Cruz de la Sierra, Bolivia) is a Bolivian footballer who currently plays goalkeeper for Sport Boys Warnes.

== Club career ==
During his professional career he also played for The Strongest, Nacional Potosí and Real Potosí.

=== Club career statistics ===
Club performance			League		Cup		League Cup		Total	
Season	Club	League	Apps	Goals	Apps	Goals	Apps	Goals	Apps	Goals
League		Apertura and Clausura			Copa Aerosur		Total			
2010	The Strongest	Liga de Fútbol Profesional Boliviano	43	0	-	-	-	-	43	0
2011	Nacional Potosí	Liga de Fútbol Profesional Boliviano	1	0	-	-	-	-	1	0
2011/12	Nacional Potosí	Liga de Fútbol Profesional Boliviano	23	0	-	-	-	-	23	0
2012/13	Real Potosí	Liga de Fútbol Profesional Boliviano	20	0	-	-	2	0	20	0
2013/14	Real Potosí	Liga de Fútbol Profesional Boliviano	12	0	-	-	-	-	12	0
2014/15	Blooming	Liga de Fútbol Profesional Boliviano	12	0	-	-	-	-	12	0
2015/16	Real Potosí	Liga de Fútbol Profesional Boliviano	0	0	-	-	-	-	0	0
Total			111	0	-	-	2	0	113	0
