= Jaime Robles Céspedes =

Bolivian footballer (born 1978)

Jaime Robles
Personal information
- Full name: Jaime Robles Céspedes
- Date of birth: February 2, 1978 (age 48)
- Place of birth: Montero, Bolivia
- Height: 1.71 m (5 ft 7 1/2 in)
- Position: Midfielder

Team information
- Current team: Aurora
- Number: 26

Senior career*
Years	Team	Apps	(Gls)
2004	Destroyers	0	(0)
2004	San José	16	(2)
2005–2006	La Paz F.C.	57	(8)
2007–2008	Universitario	56	(6)
2009	Blooming	34	(1)
2010–	Aurora	107	(5)

International career^{‡}
2008–2011	Bolivia	26	(0)
- * Club domestic league appearances and goals as of March 29, 2013 ‡ National team caps and goals as of July 10, 2011

Jaime Robles Céspedes (born 2 February 1978) is a Bolivian football midfielder who currently plays for Aurora in the Liga de Fútbol Profesional Boliviano.

His former clubs include San José, Destroyers, La Paz F.C., Universitario de Sucre and Blooming.

== National team ==
Between 2008 and 2011 Robles played in 26 games representing Bolivia .

== Club titles ==
Season	Club	Title
2008 (A)	Universitario	Liga de Fútbol Profesional Boliviano
2009 (C)	Blooming	Liga de Fútbol Profesional Boliviano
