= Edgar Olivares =

Bolivian footballer (born 1977)

Personal information
- Full name: Edgar Rolando Olivares Burgoa
- Date of birth: January 26, 1977 (age 49)
- Place of birth: Cochabamba, Bolivia
- Height: 1.76 m (5 ft 9 1/2 in)
- Position: Central midfielder

Senior career*
Years	Team	Apps	(Gls)
2000–2001	Wilstermann		
2001–2002	Bolívar	26	(2)
2003	The Strongest	27	(0)
2004–2007	Wilstermann	126	(9)
2008	La Paz	25	(2)
2009–2010	Wilstermann	60	(15)
2011–2012	Universitario de Sucre	24	(5)
2012–2013	Aurora	23	(7)

International career^{‡}
2001–2010	Bolivia	9	(1)
- * Club domestic league appearances and goals as of 1 January 2010 ‡ National team caps and goals as of 16:11, 9 February 2010 (UTC)

Edgar Rolando Olivares Burgoa (born January 26, 1977, in Cochabamba) is a Bolivian retired football midfielder.

== Club career ==
He currently plays for Universitario de Sucre in the Bolivian First Division.

== International career ==
He represented his country in four FIFA World Cup qualification matches.

== Career statistics ==
=== International ===
Appearances and goals by national team and year
National team	Year	Apps	Goals
Bolivia	2001	2	0
Bolivia	2002	3	0
Bolivia	2008	1	0
Bolivia	2009	2	1
Bolivia	2010	1	0
Total		9	1

Scores and results list Bolivia's goal tally first, score column indicates score after each Olivares goal.

List of international goals scored by Edgar Olivares
No.	Date	Venue	Opponent	Score	Result	Competition	Ref.
1	11 October 2009	Hernando Siles Stadium, La Paz, Bolivia	Brazil	1–0	2–1	2010 FIFA World Cup qualification	
