= Franklin Herrera =

Bolivian footballer (born 1988)

Personal information
- Full name: Franklin Juan Herrera Gómez
- Date of birth: April 14, 1988 (age 38)
- Place of birth: Oruro, Bolivia
- Height: 1.85 m (6 ft 1 in)
- Position: Midfielder

Team information
- Current team: Oruro Royal

Senior career*
Years	Team	Apps	(Gls)
2010–2012	San José	63	(0)
2012–	Oruro Royal		
- * Club domestic league appearances and goals

Franklin Juan Herrera Gómez is a Bolivian football player who played for Club San José as a defender. After leaving his long-time club, he played for Oruro Royal.
