= Alejandro Schiapparelli =

Argentine footballer and manager

Personal information
- Full name: Alejandro Javier Schiapparelli
- Date of birth: May 16, 1980 (age 46)
- Place of birth: Córdoba, Argentina
- Height: 1.79 m (5 ft 10 in)
- Position: Defender

Senior career*
Years	Team	Apps	(Gls)
1999–2002	Almirante Brown	52	(2)
2002	Real Cartagena	13	(0)
2003	Deportivo Colonia	12	(0)
2003–2005	San Martín (SJ)	47	(2)
2005	Quilmes	4	(0)
2006	La Serena	34	(1)
2007–2008	Blooming	68	(3)
2009	Bolívar	45	(3)
2010–2012	Oriente Petrolero	54	(6)
- * Club domestic league appearances and goals as of January 25, 2012

Alejandro Javier Schiapparelli (born May 16, 1980) is a former Argentine football defender and the current manager for San Martin de San Juan in the Primera Nacional.

Throughout his career he has also played for Almirante Brown, San Martín (SJ) and Quilmes in Argentina, Real Cartagena in Colombia, Deportivo Colonia in Uruguay, Deportes La Serena in Chile and Blooming, Bolívar and Oriente Petrolero from Bolivia.

== Club titles ==
Season	Club	Title
2009 (A)	Bolívar	Liga de Fútbol Profesional Boliviano
2010 (C)	Oriente Petrolero	Liga de Fútbol Profesional Boliviano
