= Jorge Ramírez (Uruguayan footballer) =

Uruguayan footballer (born 1986)

Jorge Ramirez
Personal information
- Full name: Jorge Andrés Ramírez Frostte
- Date of birth: 25 May 1986 (age 40)
- Place of birth: Montevideo, Uruguay
- Height: 1.84 m (6 ft 1/2 in)
- Position: Striker

Team information
- Current team: Sud América
- Number: 29

Senior career*
Years	Team	Apps	(Gls)
- Nacional
2008	Progreso	28	(5)
2009	Nacional		
2009	Atenas	9	(1)
2010	Central Español	6	(4)
2010	Oriente Petrolero	25	(10)
2011	Real España	15	(2)
2011	Rentistas	2	(0)
2012	Rocha	10	(2)
2012–2013	Isidro Metapan	31	(7)
2013–2015	Deportivo Pasto	50	(14)
2015	Patriotas Boyacá	25	(6)
2016	River Plate	21	(1)
2018	Deportivo Binacional	3	(0)
2018–2019	Alianza Atlético	33	(15)
2020–	Sud América	35	(11)
- * Club domestic league appearances and goals as of 14:24, 26 December 2021 (UTC)

Jorge Ramirez (born 25 May 1986 in Montevideo) is a Uruguayan football striker. He currently plays for Sud América.

Ramírez began his career in 2008, playing for Club Atlético Progreso before transferring to Club Nacional de Fútbol the following year. In 2010, he signed with the Bolivian side Oriente Petrolero for one year.
