= Marcelo Aguirre (footballer) =

Argentine footballer

Personal information
- Full name: Eduardo Marcelo Aguirre Biscaldi
- Date of birth: 25 August 1983 (age 43)
- Place of birth: Victoria, Entre Ríos, Argentina
- Height: 1.70 m (5 ft 7 in)
- Position: Midfielder

Youth career
- 1996–2005: Rosario Central

Senior career*
Years	Team	Apps	(Gls)
2005–2006	Rosario Central	1	(0)
2006–2010	Oriente Petrolero	135	(37)
2010	→ Rosario Central (loan)	2	(0)
2011–2012	Oriente Petrolero	57	(5)
2012–2013	Douglas Haig	15	(0)
2013–2015	Universidad de Concepción	54	(6)
- * Club domestic league appearances and goals as of 16 March 2015

Eduardo Marcelo Aguirre Biscaldi (born 25 August 1983) is an Argentine football midfielder who last played for C.D. Universidad de Concepción of the Primera B de Chile.

At age 12, Aguirre began playing in the youth ranks of Argentine club Rosario Central, where he worked his way up to the first team. On August 28, 2005, he made his official debut in the Argentine Primera División on a 4–0 victory over Lanús. However, that was the only official game he played for the canallas. In the winter of 2006, Bolivian side Oriente Petrolero signed Aguirre by recommendation of former player and Oriente idol Ronald Raldes, who knew him from his spell at Central. After four years with Oriente, Aguirre returned to Central on a loan; in hopes of helping the club win the promotion and regain a spot in first division football.
