= Oriente Petrolero =

Association football club in Bolivia

- Full name: Club Deportivo Oriente Petrolero
- Nicknames: Albiverdes; Verdolagas; Refineros; Oriente de Mil Batallas
- Founded: 5 November 1955; 70 years ago
- Ground: Estadio Ramón Tahuichi Aguilera
- Capacity: 38,000
- Chairman: Ronald Raldes
- Manager: Vacant
- League: División Profesional
- 2025: División Profesional, 12th of 16
- Website: www.orientepetrolero.com.bo
Home colours	Away colours	Third colours

Club Deportivo Oriente Petrolero (Spanish pronunciation: [kluβ ðepoɾˈtiβo oˈɾjente petɾoˈleɾo]) is a Bolivian football club based in Santa Cruz de la Sierra, Bolivia. They play at the 38,000-capacity Estadio Tahuichi Aguilera Stadium. Oriente is a five-time national champion and a two-time Copa Aerosur winner. In South American football, it is the second Bolivian team to reach the quarter-finals in Copa Libertadores.

The club had its first major success in 1971, winning the Bolivian league championship. Oriente Petrolero won several cup competitions during the 1980s, but it did not win any other major title until 1989. The early 2000s has been the most successful period in Oriente's history, capped by winning league titles in 2001 and 2010.

They have a longstanding rivalry called the Clásico Cruceño with fellow local team Blooming, which is also from Santa Cruz.

== History ==
While still in the Association of Santa Cruz, an amateur club was formed on the basis of a neighborhood team called 'Oriente', composed solely of employees of the YPFB oil company. On 5 November 1955, Elmer Saucedo Parada became the club's first president.

This preparation phase lasted until the club became one of the main players in the championships of the ACF, ranking consistently among the top three.

In 1957, they won the title of first ascent two years and won their first title in First of Honor. In 1960, they were second, and in 1961, they won their second title in six years after defeating Blooming 1–0 in the final.

In 1965, they placed their first ACF professional tournament, and finished in second place behind Club Destroyers. The next year, the same thing happened. However, in 1967, they won their first professional title after finishing in front of their classic rival Club Blooming.

In 1971, they won their first Bolivian Primera División title. This meant they qualified for the 1972 Copa Libertadores, their first Copa Libertadores.

Oriente Petrolero has won national titles in the Bolivian league in 1979, 1990, 2001.

In 2001, Oriente renovated players, and that was one of the most important years for the club because in the Torneo Apertura 2 Oriente end up in the second place and Bolivar first. They drew with the same number of points but Bolivar won on goal differential. In the 2001 Clausura Oriente gained a berth to the Copa Libertadores by winning their third national championship and the Copa Sudamericana after finishing second in the Apertura.

In the 2002 Copa Libertadores, Oriente could not qualify for the next round after finishing last in their group, Group 2. What surprised Oriente was that they were winning by 2–0 vs Grêmio at the first half, then at the second half their goalkeeper got injured and made the team go down. The final result was 4–2.

In the 2002 Copa Sudamericana, Bolívar eliminated Oriente in the First Phase. Bolivar won the first leg 4–2. Although Oriente won the second leg 1–0, they were eliminated in aggregate score of 4–3.

In the 2002 Torneo Apertura Oriente finished in third place, so they missed a chance to qualify for Copa Sudamericana. In the Torneo Clausura Oriente finished second. However, in the aggregate table, Oriente and The Strongest drew with the same number of points so they played two games. In the first leg Oriente won 1–0 and in the second leg The Strongest won 2–1. They played an extra game because the global score was 2-2 and Oriente won on penalties to secure a place in the Copa Libertadores.

In the Copa Libertadores 2003, Oriente made the worst participation ever after finishing bottom of their group with only one point. They managed to secure a draw against Universitario of Peru.

In 2008 Oriente finished fourth in the Apertura 2008 and not gaining a place in the Copa Sudamericana or Copa Libertadores, but they had two more championships to be played. In the Clausura Oriente they could not advance to the next stage after finishing third and letting Aurora qualify.

In the Torneo Play-off Oriente at least qualified to the Loser's round. In that round Oriente beat Aurora by 6–0, but in the final they lost against San Jose 4–2 on Aggregate.

In 2009 the Bolivian Professional Football League (LFPB) confirmed the club The Strongest as Clausura 2004 tournament champion, after five years of the challenge with which they took the title with Oriente. The League president, Mauricio Mendez said that legally the title belongs to the Aurinegra, which at that time had in its ranks the Argentine goalkeeper Marcelo Robledo, whose performance was observed by teams of Union Central and Jorge Wilstermann and arguing that no documents had realized that he was Bolivian.

This was an issue not resolved, because the board of the club showed that the goalkeeper had already won the Bolivian nationality before the High Court for Sports Discipline (TSDD), however, the title was given to another runner with Oriente Petrolero causing the controversy.

The leadership of the club called the decision as fair, because this year the La Paz team fought until the end for the title and the title was the reward for the effort of the players. In conclusion The Strongest was awarded the championship.

In 2009 Oriente was close to the title, but they could not win their last two away games against The Strongest and Bolivar. In the Clausura Oriente could advance to next stage, but in the quarter-final Oriente surprisingly knocked out Bolivar (anyway, they qualified as the best loser). In the semi-final they lost against their classic rival Blooming. Oriente gained the third place in Clausura that gave Oriente a second participation in the Copa Sudamericana.

In the Torneo Playoff Oriente eliminated their rival Blooming (Qualified to best Loser's round), in the quarter-final Oriente eliminated San Jose. In the Semi-final Oriente was eliminated by Bolívar after drawing in two games. That year Oriente had spent a lot of money in strikers, but after two years Oriente qualified to an international cup.

Oriente began with Aerosur Cup, but were eliminated in the first stage. After being eliminated, they received an invitation from Peruvian Football Federation to participate in the Peru International Cup. On 3 February they eliminated Deportivo Garcilaso 3–2 in the semi-final and in the final they beat Cienciano 3–0 on penalties after drawing 0–0 after 90 minutes and they won their first Peru International Cup.

=== Historical participation in the Copa Libertadores 1988 ===
In the Copa Libertadores 1988, Oriente was drawn in group 4 with: Bolívar (Bolivian rivals), Cerro Porteño, and Olimpia. Oriente finished first in the group with seven points. They began their campaign by beating fellow Bolivian rivals Bolivar 2–1 in La Paz. They then played Olimpia at home in Santa Cruz and won 1–0, and also won the away leg 2–1. They later tied at home with Cerro Porteño 2-2, although they lost the away leg in Asunción 1–0, and lost 3–1 to Bolivar at home.

In the second phase, their rival was Colo-Colo of Chile. In the first leg played on September 8 in Santa Cruz, they took advantage and won 2–1. While in the return match played on September 14 in Santiago de Chile, the match ended 0–0. They qualified to the next round.

In the quarterfinals, their opponent was América de Cali in Colombia. In the first leg played on September 21 in Santa Cruz, the game ended in a 1–1 draw. However, in the second leg played on October 28 in Cali, America won 2–0 thereby eliminating Oriente.

With this historic participation, Oriente alongside Bolívar became the second team in Bolivia that have made it to the quarterfinals of the Copa Libertadores.

== Uniform ==
- Home: green shirt with white horizontal stripes, green shorts, white socks.
- Away: White shirts, white shorts, white socks

== Honours ==
=== National ===
- Bolivian Primera División
  - Winners (5): 1971, 1979, 1990, 2001, 2010
- Torneo de Play-Off
  - Winners (1): 2010

=== Regional ===
- Campeonato Cruceño
  - Winners (11): 1959, 1961, 1962, 1964, 1967, 1969, 1970, 1971, 1972, 1973, 1976
- Torneo Integrado ACF-AFC
  - Winners (1): 1976
- 2.° de Ascenso
  - Winners (1): 1956
- 1.° de Ascenso
  - Winners (1): 1957

== Performance in CONMEBOL competitions ==
- Copa Libertadores: 19 appearances

Best: Quarter-Finals in 1988
1988 – Quarter-Finals
2011 – First Stage

- Copa Sudamericana: 2 appearances

Best: Second Stage in 2010
2010 – Second Stage

- Copa CONMEBOL: 2 appearances

1992 – First Round
1994 – First Round

- Copa Merconorte: 1 appearance

2000 – Group stage

=== International ===
- Cuadrangular Internacional del Peru:
  - Winners (1): 2010

== Current squad ==
As of 10 April, 2026

Note: Flags indicate national team as defined under FIFA eligibility rules; some limited exceptions apply. Players may hold more than one non-FIFA nationality.

No.	Pos.	Nation	Player
1	GK	BOL	Alejandro Torres
2	DF	COL	Andrés Ariza
3	DF	DOM	Danco
4	DF	BOL	Manuel Bonilla
5	DF	FRA	Eliaquim Mangala
6	MF	PAR	Jordan Santacruz
7	FW	BOL	José Flores (on loan from The Strongest)
8	MF	BOL	Nicolás Barreto
9	FW	BOL	Marcelo Martins
10	FW	CMR	Kévin Soni
11	FW	BOL	Leonardo Vaca
12	GK	BOL	Luis Cárdenas
13	GK	BOL	Joel Bernal
14	DF	BOL	Enrique Taborga

No.	Pos.	Nation	Player
16	MF	BOL	Gary Rea
17	MF	BOL	Mirko Tomianovic
19	FW	BOL	Gilbert Álvarez
20	MF	BOL	Jorge Lovera
22	GK	BOL	Jorge Araúz
23	FW	COL	Joel Contreras (on loan from Unión Magdalena)
24	DF	BOL	Marco Velasco (on loan from Club Bolívar)
27	DF	BOL	Sebastián Álvarez
28	DF	BOL	Jhon Velasco
30	MF	BOL	Jamir Berdecio
36	DF	BOL	Manuel Reyes
42	DF	BOL	Dico Roca
88	MF	BOL	Luciano Ursino
91	FW	BOL	Nabil Nacif

=== Player of the year ===
Year	Winner
2000	(Argentina) Miguel Abrigo
2001	(Bolivia) José Alfredo Castillo
2002	(Bolivia) José Alfredo Castillo
2003	(Bolivia) Ronald Raldes
2004	(Bolivia) Ronald Arana
2005	(Argentina) Martín Palavicini
2006	(Argentina) Marcelo Aguirre
2007	(Bolivia) Sergio Galarza
2008	(Bolivia) Limberg Gutiérrez
2009	(Bolivia) Joselito Vaca
2010	(Argentina) Alejandro Schiapparelli
2011	(Bolivia) Patrício Ortega

== Managers ==
- (Bolivia) Víctor Hugo Antelo (2001-2002), (2005-2006)
- (Argentina) Néstor Clausen (2007-2008)
- (Bolivia) Víctor Hugo Antelo (2008-2009)
- (Argentina) Pablo Sánchez (2009)
- (Bolivia) Marco Etcheverry (2009-2010)
- (Bolivia) Gustavo Quinteros (2010-2011)
- (Bolivia) Erwin Sánchez (2012)
- (Argentina) Roberto Pompei (2013)
- (Bolivia) Eduardo Villegas (2014)
- (Uruguay) Tabaré Silva (2014)
- (Argentina) Roberto Pompei (2015)
- (Spain) Xabier Azkargorta (2015-2016)
- (Bolivia) Eduardo Villegas (2017)
- (Argentina) Néstor Clausen (2018)
- (Argentina) Juan Manuel Llop (2018)
- (Bolivia) Ronald Arana (2018)
- (Bolivia) Mauricio Soria (2019)
- (Bolivia) Luis Marín Camacho (2019)
- (Argentina) Pablo Sánchez (2019-2020)
- (Bolivia) Erwin Sánchez (2020-2023)
- (Argentina) Ángel Guillermo Hoyos (2023)
- (Spain) Antonio Puche (2023)
- (Chile) Rodrigo Venegas (2023)
- (Bolivia) Víctor Hugo Antelo (2024)
- (Bolivia) Joaquín Monasterio (2024)
- (Chile) Rodrigo Venegas (2025)
- (Bolivia) Gualberto Mojica (2025-)

== Club hierarchy ==
Oriente Ltd.

Owner: Unknown

Oriente Petrolero plc

Chairman: Jose Ernesto Alvarez

Executive Board

Chief Executive: Álvaro Velasco
Finance and Operations Director :
Club Secretary : Richard Méndez Cossío
company secretary :
