= 2008 Copa Aerosur & del Sur =

Copa Aerosur
- Season: 2008
- 2008 Copa Aerosur: Blooming (2nd title)

Following are the results of the 2008 Copa Aerosur, the Bolivian football tournament held in La Paz, Cochabamba and Santa Cruz, sponsored by AeroSur airline.

In this edition teams from 2nd and 3rd division participate, but for them instead of winning free passage on Aerosur to travel to play their games during 2008, they will receive $10000 and the runner-up $5000.

For LPFB team the Copa Aerosur champion will have free passage on Aerosur to travel to play their games during the 2008 season of the Bolivian Professional Football League, while the runner will have a 75% discount. The other participants may access the 50% discount on tickets if they agree to bring the airline's logo on his uniform.

The 2008 version of the cup has three novelties: [1] defined by shootout in case of ties in all instances of the tournament, the implementation of a tournament U-18 parallel to the official tournament, and a recoil to be played between the champion Aerosur Cup, the champion of the Copa Aerosur del Sur and two foreign clubs.

== 1st qualifying round ==
Team 1	Agg.	Team 2	1st leg	2nd leg
Litoral	3–2	Francesa	3–0	1–1
Independiente Petrolero	1–0	Always Ready	0–0	1–0
ABB	3–1	Cristal	1–1	2–0
Real Santa Cruz	4–3	Nacional Potosí	2–2	2–1

== 2nd qualifying round ==
Team 1	Agg.	Team 2	1st leg	2nd leg
Litoral	2–3	Unión Central	2–0	0–3
Independiente Petrolero	4–2	1 de Mayo	2–1	2–1
Vaca Diez	3–1	Mariscal Braun	1–1	2–0
Universitario (B)	5–3	Universidad de Santa Cruz	3–2	2–1
ABB	4–1	Fraternidad Tigres	2–1	2–0
Destroyers	4–1	Deportivo Ferroviario	2–1	2–0
Stormers San Lorenzo	0–1	31 de Octubre	0–0	0–1
Real Santa Cruz	2–1	Chaco Petrolero	2–1	0–0

== 3rd qualifying round ==
Team 1	Agg.	Team 2	1st leg	2nd leg
Independiente Petrolero	4–3	Unión Central	2–2	2–1
Vaca Diez	0–1	Universitario (B)	0–1	0–0
ABB	2–3	Destroyers	1–2	1–1
Real Santa Cruz	4–1	31 de Octubre	1–1	3–0

== Bracket ==
First knockout round
1	Independiente Petrolero	1	2	3
16	Universitario	3	2	5
8	Universitario (B)	0	2	2
9	La Paz	1	0	1
5	ABB	1	2	3
12	Blooming	1	4	5
4	Real Santa Cruz	1	1	2
13	Oriente Petrolero	2	2	4
6	San José	3	1	4
11	Bolívar	4	2	6
3	Aurora	2	0	2
14	The Strongest(a)	1	1	2
7	Real Mamoré	1	2	3
10	Jorge Wilstermann	3	1	4
2	Real Potosí (p)	0	0	0 (7)
15	Guabirá	0	0	0 (6)

Quarter-finals
Universitario	4	1	5
Universitario (B)	0	1	1
Blooming	0	4	4(8)
Oriente Petrolero	4	0	4(7)
Bolívar	2	1	3
The Strongest	2	0	2
Jorge Wilstermann	1	3	4
Real Potosí	1	2	3

Semi-finals
Universitario	3	0	3
Blooming(a)	2	1	3
Bolívar	1	2	3
Jorge Wilstermann	2	3	5

Final
Jorge Wilstermann	3
Blooming	4

== Quarter-final ==
Team 1	Agg.	Team 2	1st leg	2nd leg
Universitario	5–1	Universitario (B)	4–0	1–1
Blooming	4–4	Oriente Petrolero	0–4	4–0
Bolívar	3–2	The Strongest	2–2	1–0
Jorge Wilstermann	4–3	Real Potosí	1–1	3–2

January 20
15:30

Universitario	4 – 0	Universitario (B)
Rolando Ribera 23'; Mauricio Saucedo; 45' Marvin Bejarano 56'; Pedro Zabála 76'

Estadio Olímpico Patria, Sucre
Attendance: 25,000

January 21
17:30

Blooming	0 – 4	Oriente Petrolero
		Miguel Hoyos 12'; Jhasmani Campos 34'; Alcides Peña 75' (89)

Estadio Tahuichi Aguilera, Santa Cruz, Bolivia
Attendance: 34,000

January 21
18:30

Bolívar	2– 2	The Strongest
Leonel Reyes 34'; Abdón Reyes 88'		Oscar Arauz 23' (65),

Estadio Hernando Siles, La Paz
Attendance: 44,000

January 21
18:30

Jorge Wilstermann	1– 1	Real Potosí
Jair Torrico 21'		Miguel Loayza 45'

Felix Capriles, Cochabamba
Attendance: 24,000

Second Leg

January 20
15:30

Universitario (B)	1– 1	Universitario
Juan Da Costa 76'		Aldo Peña 21'

Estadio Gran Mamoré, Trinidad
Attendance: 29,000

January 21
17:30

Oriente Petrolero	0–4	Blooming
		Sergio Jáuregui 21' (90); Gualberto Mojica 29' (78)

Estadio Tahuichi Aguilera, Santa Cruz, Bolivia
Attendance: 40,000

January 21
18:30

The Strongest	0–1	Bolívar
		Luis Torrico 32'

Estadio Hernando Siles, La Paz
Attendance: 45,000

January 21
18:30

Real Potosí	3–2	Jorge Wilstermann
Gerardo Yecerotte 12'; Edhemir Rodríguez 68' (80)		Carmelo Angulo 23' (87)

Estadio Victor Agustín Ugarte, Potosí
Attendance: 28,000

== Semi-final ==
Team 1	Agg.	Team 2	1st leg	2nd leg
Universitario	3– 3(a)	Blooming	3–1	0–2
Bolívar	3–5	Jorge Wilstermann	1–2	2–3

January 20
15:30

Universitario	3 – 1	Blooming
Ramiro Ballivián 15'; Ronald Rivero 19' (43)		Raúl Gutierrez 12'

Estadio Olímpico Patria, Sucre
Attendance: 29,000

January 21
18:30

Bolívar	1–2	Jorge Wilstermann
Rudy Cardozo 54'		Amilcar Sánchez 32'; Carmelo Angulo 64'

Estadio Hernando Siles, La Paz
Attendance: 42,000

January 21
17:30

Blooming	2–0	Universitario
Joselito Vaca 43' (67)

Estadio Tahuichi Aguilera, Santa Cruz, Bolivia
Attendance: 41,000

January 21
18:30

Jorge Wilstermann	3–2	Bolívar
Wálter Veizaga 10'; José Gabriel Ríos 76' (89)		Leonel Reyes 30' (45)

Felix Capriles, Cochabamba
Attendance: 35,000

== Final ==
January 21
21:50 (UTC-2)

Jorge Wilstermann	3–4	Blooming
Hugo Suárez 21' (80); Carmelo Angulo 44'		Hernán Boyero 31', 56'; Ricardo Verduguez 65'; Dustin Maldonado 87'

Estadio Tahuichi Aguilera, Santa Cruz, Bolivia
Attendance: 30,000
Referee: René Ortubé
