= 2008 Liga de Fútbol Profesional Boliviano =

Liga de Fútbol Profesional Boliviano
- Season: 2008
- Champions: Apertura: Universitario (1st title); Clausura: Aurora (1st title)
- Relegated: Guabirá
- Copa Libertadores: Universitario de Sucre; Aurora; Real Potosí
- Copa Sudamericana: La Paz; Blooming

The 2008 Liga de Fútbol Profesional Boliviano was the 32nd season of Bolivia's top-flight professional football league. The season was split into two championships: the Apertura and the Clausura.

== Teams and venues ==
Team	Location	Venue	Capacity
Universitario de Sucre	Sucre	Estadio Olímpico Patria	32,000
La Paz	La Paz	Estadio Hernando Siles	42,000
San José	Oruro	Estadio Jesús Bermúdez	33,000
Oriente Petrolero	Santa Cruz de la Sierra	Estadio Tahuichi Aguilera	38,000
Blooming	Santa Cruz de la Sierra	Estadio Tahuichi Aguilera	38,000
Bolívar	La Paz	Estadio Libertador Simón Bolivar	25,000
Aurora	Cochabamba	Estadio Felix Capriles	32,000
The Strongest	La Paz	Estadio Rafael Mendoza	15,000
Real Mamoré	Trinidad	Estadio Gran Mamoré	12,000
Jorge Wilstermann	Cochabamba	Felix Capriles	32,000
Real Potosí	Potosí	Estadio Victor Agustín Ugarte	32,000
Guabirá	Montero	Estadio Gilberto Parada	18,000

== Torneo Apertura ==
The 2008 Campeonato Apertura Entel was the first championship of the season. It began on February 23 and ended on July 20.

Pos	Team	Pld	W	D	L	GF	GA	GD	Pts	Qualification
1	Universitario (C, Q)	22	12	7	3	36	17	+19	43	2009 Copa Libertadores Second Stage
2	La Paz (Q)	22	10	7	5	44	30	+14	37	2009 Copa Sudamericana First Stage
3	San José	22	11	3	8	46	45	+1	36	
4	Oriente Petrolero	22	10	3	9	41	35	+6	33	
5	Blooming	22	9	4	9	39	41	−2	31	
6	Bolívar	22	7	9	6	41	26	+15	30	
7	Aurora	22	8	6	8	33	41	−8	30	
8	The Strongest	22	8	5	9	41	36	+5	29	
9	Real Mamoré	22	9	1	12	27	52	−25	28	
10	Jorge Wilstermann	22	8	3	11	41	46	−5	27	
11	Real Potosí	22	6	7	9	41	39	+2	25	
12	Guabirá	22	5	3	14	26	48	−22	18	

Updated to match(es) played on July 20, 2008. Source: RSSSF
Rules for classification: 1) points; 2) goal difference; 3) number of goals scored.
(C) Champions; (Q) Qualified for the phase indicated

Liga de Fútbol Profesional Boliviano
2008 Apertura champion

1st title

=== Top goalscorers ===
Pos	Name	Club	Goals
1	(Brazil) Anderson Gonzaga	Blooming	16
2	(Uruguay) Álvaro Pintos	Real Potosí	15
2	(Bolivia) Ricardo Pedriel	Jorge Wilstermann	15
4	(Paraguay) Pablo Escobar	The Strongest	11
5	(Bolivia) Darwin Peña	San José	10
5	(Argentina) Hernán Boyero	Blooming	10
5	(Brazil) Regis de Souza	La Paz	10

== Torneo Clausura ==
The 2008 Campeonato Clausura Entel was the second championship of the season. It began on August 3 and ended on November 3.

=== First phase ===
==== Serie A ====
Pos	Team	Pld	W	D	L	GF	GA	GD	Pts
1	Blooming (A)	10	6	2	2	18	9	+9	20
2	Aurora (A)	10	6	1	3	17	10	+7	19
3	Oriente Petrolero	10	4	4	2	12	8	+4	16
4	Real Mamoré	10	3	3	4	10	10	0	12
5	Jorge Wilstermann	10	3	3	4	10	11	−1	12
6	Guabirá	10	1	1	8	8	27	−19	4

Updated to match(es) played on October 2, 2008. Source: RSSSF
Rules for classification: 1) points; 2) goal difference; 3) number of goals scored.
(A) Advance to a further round

==== Serie B ====
Pos	Team	Pld	W	D	L	GF	GA	GD	Pts
1	Real Potosí (A)	10	5	1	4	14	9	+5	16
2	La Paz (A)	10	4	4	2	13	12	+1	16
3	Bolívar	10	4	3	3	18	18	0	15
4	Universitario de Sucre	10	3	4	3	11	13	−2	13
5	The Strongest	10	2	5	3	16	21	−5	11
6	San José	10	2	3	5	15	14	+1	9

Updated to match(es) played on October 2, 2008. Source: RSSSF
Rules for classification: 1) points; 2) goal difference; 3) number of goals scored.
(A) Advance to a further round

=== Second phase ===
==== First leg ====
October 19

La Paz	2 – 1	Blooming
de Souza 24'; Lopez 70' (o.g.)		Vaca 63'

Estadio Hernando Siles, La Paz

October 19

Real Potosí	1 – 1	Aurora
Galindo 6'		Castellon 57'

Estadio Victor Agustín Ugarte, Potosí

==== Second leg ====
October 22

Aurora	2 – 0	Real Potosí
Leonforte 10'; Bongioani 41'

Estadio Felix Capriles, Cochabamba

October 23

Blooming	5 – 0	La Paz
Boyero 21'; Saucedo 34'; Vieira 71'; Sabja 79'; Mojica 81'

Estadio Tahuichi Aguilera, Santa Cruz

=== Final phase ===
The finals was a best-of-three series.

==== Game 1 ====
October 26

Blooming	2 – 0	Aurora
Schiapparelli 34'; Boyero 74'

Estadio Tahuichi Aguilera, Santa Cruz

Blooming is ahead 1–0.

==== Game 2 ====
October 29

Aurora	3 – 0	Blooming
Bongioani 64' (pen.); Huayhuata 79', 90'

Estadio Felix Capriles, Cochabamba

Series tied 1–1.

==== Game 3 ====
November 3

Aurora	2 – 2 (a.e.t.)	Blooming
Villalba 9', 50'		Mojica 15'; Boyero 20'
Penalties
	4 – 3

Aurora won 2–1.

Liga de Fútbol Profesional Boliviano
2008 Clausura champion

1st title

- Aurora qualified for 2009 Copa Libertadores Second Stage.
- Blooming qualified for 2009 Copa Sudamericana First Stage.

== Torneo Play Off ==
=== First round ===
Team 1	Agg.	Team 2	1st leg	2nd leg
La Paz	4–3	San José	1–2	3–1
Bolívar	2–1	The Strongest	0–0	2–1
Real Mamoré	3–0	Guabirá	3–0	0–0
Real Potosí	6–4	Universitario de Sucre	4–2	2–2
Jorge Wilstermann	3–2	Aurora	0–1	3–1
Blooming	5–4	Oriente Petrolero	3–3	2–1

As the four best losers, Oriente Petrolero, San José, Aurora, and The Strongest qualified to the Losers Round.

=== Losers Round ===
==== Semifinals ====
Team 1	Agg.	Team 2	1st leg	2nd leg
Aurora	0–6	Oriente Petrolero	0–5	0–1
San José	3–1	The Strongest	3–0	0–1

==== Final ====
Team 1	Agg.	Team 2	1st leg	2nd leg
San José	4–2	Oriente Petrolero	4–2	0–0

San José qualified for the semifinals as the best loser.

=== Quarterfinals ===
Team 1	Agg.	Team 2	1st leg	2nd leg
Blooming	3–3 (3–4 (p))	La Paz	2–1	1–2
Bolívar	1–1 (5–4 (p))	Jorge Wilstermann	1–0	0–1
Real Mamoré	2–3	Real Potosí	1–2	1–1

=== Semifinals ===
Team 1	Agg.	Team 2	1st leg	2nd leg
Bolívar	1–1 (5–4 (p))	Real Potosí	2–0	0–2
La Paz	4–4	San José	1–1	3–3

=== Finals ===
==== First leg ====
December 14

La Paz	0 – 1	Real Potosí
		Candia 24'

==== Second leg ====
December 17

Real Potosí	1 – 0	La Paz
Colque 55'

Real Potosi wins 2–0 on aggregate. Real Potosi qualified for the First Stage of the 2009 Copa Libertadores.

Liga de Fútbol Profesional Boliviano
2008 Play Off champion

1st title

== Relegation ==
The team with the worst average is relegated to the Regional Leagues. The second-worst team plays a promotion/relegation playoff against the runner-up of the Regional Leagues.

Pos	Teams	Total Pld	Total Pts	Avg
1	La Paz	66	112	1.6969
2	Blooming	66	103	1.5606
3	Bolívar	66	97	1.4696
4	Oriente Petrolero	66	96	1.4545
4	Real Potosí	66	96	1.4545
4	Universitario de Sucre	66	96	1.4545
7	The Strongest	66	93	1.4090
8	Jorge Wilstermann	66	92	1.3939
9	Aurora	66	89	1.3484
9	San José	66	89	1.3484
11	Real Mamoré	66	79	1.1969
12	Guabirá	32	22	0.6875

Playoff match
Relegated to the Santa Cruz Association Championship

=== Promotion/relegation playoff ===
First leg

14 December 2008

Real Mamoré	2–1	1 de Mayo

Second leg

17 December 2008

1 de Mayo	1–2	Real Mamoré

Real Mamoré won 4–2 on aggregate. Real Mamoré remains in the First Division for 2009.
