= 2010 Copa Aerosur & del Sur =

Copa Aerosur & del Sur
- Season: 2010
- 2010 Copa Aerosur: Bolívar (2nd title)
- 2010 Copa Aerosur del Sur: Guabirá (1st title)

The Copa Aerosur & del Sur 2010 was the eighth edition of the summer soccer tournament sponsored by Aerosur. It involved six teams from the core cities in Bolivia: Bolivar and The Strongest of La Paz, Cochabamba Aurora and Wilstermann, Blooming and Oriente Petrolero of Santa Cruz, and six teams from 2009 Copa Simón Bolívar.

The Copa Aerosur & del Sur 2010 had novelties involving six teams from Regional League who participated in Copa Simon Bolivar. If one of these teams won the Copa Aerosur they would receive $150,000 from Aerosur Company. For the LPFB teams the winner received a full free ticket for the whole year and $90,000 and the runner-up 75% discount; this also applied for Copa del Sur teams.

In the previous season, Bolivar won its first title after against Jorge Wilstermann. In this season, Bolivar wanted to defend the title and to be one of the teams with the most championships along with Blooming and Oriente Petrolero.

== Copa Aerosur ==
The Champions of Copa Aerosur would play an international match against Club Atlético River Plate (Uruguay) unless the champion was playing Copa Libertadores when the match would be for the runner-up.

=== Play-off round ===
Team 1	Agg.	Team 2	1st leg	2nd leg
Bolívar	3–2	The Strongest	2–1	1–1
Blooming	4–2	Oriente Petrolero	3–1	1–1
Jorge Wilstermann	4–1	Aurora	1–0	3–1

First leg

January 18
15:30

Bolívar	2–1	The Strongest
William Ferreira 20'; Charles da Silva 74'	(Report)	Herman Soliz 49'

Estadio Hernando Siles, La Paz
Attendance: 40,000
Referee: René Ortubé

January 19
19:30

Jorge Wilstermann	1–0	Aurora
Édgar Olivares 23'	(Report)

Félix Capriles, Cochabamba
Attendance: 31,000
Referee: Rauls Orozco

January 20
20:30

Blooming	3–1	Oriente Petrolero
Juan Carlos Sánchez 27'; Luís Sillero 31'; José Luis Chávez 49'	(Report)	Marcelo Aguirre 61'

Estadio Ramón Tahuichi Aguilera, Santa Cruz de la Sierra
Attendance: 35,000
Referee: Joaquín Antequera

Second leg

January 18
15:30

The Strongest	1–1	Bolívar
Darwin Peña 8'	(Report)	William Ferreira 5'

Estadio Hernando Siles, La Paz
Attendance: 39,000
Referee: Oscar Maldonado

January 19
19:30

Aurora	1–3	Jorge Wilstermann
Iván Huayhuata 74'	(Report)	Miguel Ortiz 25'; Fernando Sanjurjo 56'; Silvio Dulcich 62'

Félix Capriles, Cochabamba
Attendance: 33,000

January 24
19:00

Oriente Petrolero	1 – 1	Blooming
Juan Carlos Arce 29'	(Report)	Juan Carlos Sánchez 25'

Estadio Ramón Tahuichi Aguilera, Santa Cruz de la Sierra
Attendance: 36,000

=== Semi-final ===
- The Strongest qualified as the best loser.

Team 1	Agg.	Team 2	1st leg	2nd leg
Bolívar	2–1	Blooming	2–1	0–0
Jorge Wilstermann	2–1	The Strongest	1–1	1–0

January 27
15:30

The Strongest	1–1	Jorge Wilstermann
Martín Menacho 47'	(Report)	Amílkar Sánche 41'

Estadio Hernando Siles, La Paz
Attendance: 30,000

January 18
15:30

Bolívar	2–1	Blooming
William Ferreira 34' (45)	(Report)	Luís Sillero 71'

Estadio Hernando Siles, La Paz
Attendance: 38,000

Second leg

February 1
15:30

Jorge Wilstermann	1–0	The Strongest
Iván Huayhuata 74'	(Report)

Félix Capriles, Cochabamba
Attendance: 33,000

February 1
19:00

Blooming	0 – 0	Bolívar
	(Report)

Estadio Ramón Tahuichi Aguilera, Santa Cruz de la Sierra
Attendance: 31,000

=== Final ===
Team 1	Agg.	Team 2	1st leg	2nd leg
Bolívar	2–1	Jorge Wilstermann	1–1	0–0

February 3
15:30

Bolívar	1–1	Jorge Wilstermann
Ignacio Ithurralde 90'	(Report)	Nicolás Raimondi 68'

Estadio Hernando Siles, La Paz
Attendance: 36,000
February 1
15:30

Jorge Wilstermann	1–1	Bolívar
Nicolás Raimondi 24'	(Report)	William Ferreira 75'
Penalties
(penalty scored) Sanjurjo; (penalty scored) Raimondi; (penalty missed) Castedo; (penalty scored) Barrera; (penalty missed) Salaberry	3 – 4	Ferreira (penalty scored); Ithurralde (penalty scored); Rivero (penalty scored); Arias (penalty scored) da Rosa (penalty missed)

Félix Capriles, Cochabamba
Attendance: 30,000

=== Copa Aerosur Internacional ===
- Because Bolivar qualified for Copa Libertadores then the International game was for the runner-up.

Team 1	Score	Team 2
Jorge Wilstermann	2–2 (2–4 p)	River Plate (Uruguay)

February 15
15:30

Jorge Wilstermann	2–2	River Plate (Uruguay)
Jehaname Castedo 5'; Nelso Soza 89'	Report	Gabriel Marques 25'; Jorge Zambrana 49'
Penalties
(penalty missed) Sanjurjo; (penalty scored) Sossa; (penalty scored) Salaberry; (penalty missed) Barrera	2 – 4	Laforia (penalty scored); Rodríguez (penalty scored); Puppo (penalty scored); Marquez (penalty scored)

Estadio Felix Capriles, Cochabamba
Attendance: 16,000
Referee: René Ortubé

== Copa Aerosur del Sur ==
Estadio Olímpico Patria would host this edition and for the first time the champion of Copa Aerosur del Sur would play an international against Rio Branco Club from Brazil.

=== Quarter-final ===
Team 1	Score	Team 2
Universitario	3–1	Real Mamoré
San José	4–1	La Paz
Real Potosí	2–2(2–4 p)	Guabirá

January 30
15:00

San José	4–1	La Paz
Christian Díaz 40', 54'; Regis de Souza 56'; Marcelo Guaymas 90'	(Report)	Fabricio Silva 1'

Estadio Olímpico Patria, Sucre
January 30
16:30

Real Potosí	2–2	Guabirá
Augusto Andaveris 4', 23'	(Report)	Getulio Vaca Díez 89'; Luis Cristaldo 90'

Estadio Olímpico Patria, Sucre
January 30
19:30

Universitario	3–1	Real Mamoré
Marvin Bejarano 11'; Tobías Albarracín 63'; Gustavo Paz 82'	(Report)	Martín Palavicini 37'

Estadio Olímpico Patria, Sucre

=== Semi-final ===
- Real Potosi qualified as the best loser.

Team 1	Score	Team 2
Universitario	1–2	Guabirá
Real Potosí	4–3	San José

February 7
16:30

Universitario	1–2	Guabirá
Delio Ojeda 10'	(Report)	Ricardo Verduguez 10'; Franklin Becerra 90'

Estadio Olímpico Patria, Sucre
February 7
19:30

Real Potosi	4–3	San José
Gerardo Yacerotte 35'; Augusto Andaveris 36', 75', 81'	(Report)	Regis de Souza 51', 58'; Christian Díaz 53'

Estadio Olímpico Patria, Sucre

=== Final ===
Team 1	Score	Team 2
Real Potosí	1–1 (4–5 p)	Guabirá

February 3
15:30

Real Potosí	1–1	Guabirá
Augusto Andaveris 18'	(Report)	Gonzalo Daniel Acosta 67'

Estadio Olímpico Patria, Sucre
