= 2009 Copa Aerosur & del Sur =

Copa Aerosur
- Season: 2010
- 2009 Copa Aerosur: Bolívar (1st title)
- 2009 Copa Aerosur del Sur: San José (1st title)

La Copa Aerosur 2009 is the seventh edition of the summer soccer tournament sponsored by Aerosur. Involved six teams of core cities in Bolivia: Bolivar and The Strongest of La Paz, Cochabamba Aurora and Wilstermann, Blooming and Oriente Petrolero of Santa Cruz. The tournament began on January 18, 2009 and culminate on February 4 of that year.

The 2009 version of the cup had three novelties: [1] defined by shootout in case of ties in all instances of the tournament, the implementation of a tournament U-18 parallel to the official tournament, and a recoil to be played between the champion Aerosur Cup, the champion of the Copa Aerosur del Sur and two foreign expos.

Cup champion will have free passage on Aerosur to travel to play their games during the 2009 season of the Bolivian Professional Football League, while the runner will have a 75% discount. The other participants may access the 50% discount on tickets if they agree to bring the airline's logo on his uniform.

In this Edition the teams (Copa Simon Bolivar 2008) with the best average qualified to the first round of this edition.

== Teams that qualified to group stage ==
| Team | Home city | Home stadium |
|---|---|---|
| Aurora | Cochabamba | Estadio Félix Capriles |
| Blooming | Santa Cruz | Estadio Tahuichi Aguilera |
| Bolívar | La Paz | Estadio Libertador Simón Bolívar |
| Universitario | Cochabamba | Estadio Félix Capriles |
| La Paz | La Paz | Estadio Hernando Siles |
| Nacional Potosí | Potosí | Estadio Victor Agustín Ugarte |
| Oriente Petrolero | Santa Cruz | Estadio Tahuichi Aguilera |
| Real Mamoré | Trinidad | Estadio Gran Mamoré |
| Real Potosí | Potosí | Estadio Victor Agustín Ugarte |
| San José | Oruro | Estadio Jesús Bermúdez |
| The Strongest | La Paz | Estadio Rafael Mendoza |
| Universitario | Sucre | Estadio Olímpico Patria |

== Qualifying round ==
| Team 1 | Agg. | Team 2 | 1st leg | 2nd leg |
|---|---|---|---|---|
| Ciclón | 4–1 | Primero De Mayo | 3–0 | 1–1 |
| Nacional Potosi | 4–5 | Destroyers | 2–2 | 2–3 |
| Independiente Petrolero | 3–1 | Fancesa | 3–1 | 0–0 |

== Group stage ==
Key to colours in group tables
Group winners advanced to Semi-Final.
Second-placed teams enter the Copa Aerosur del Sur

== Group A ==
In this group Nacional Potosi qualified anyway as the copa simon bolivar 2008 winners

| Team | Pts | Pld | W | D | L | GF | GA | GD |
|---|---|---|---|---|---|---|---|---|
| Bolivar | 16 | 6 | 5 | 1 | 0 | 23 | 14 | +10 |
| La Paz | 14 | 6 | 4 | 2 | 3 | 14 | 10 | +7 |
| Nacional Potosi | 11 | 6 | 3 | 2 | 1 | 18 | 17 | +4 |
| Destroyers | 9 | 6 | 3 | 0 | 3 | 18 | 18 | +1 |

== Group B ==
| Team | Pts | Pld | W | D | L | GF | GA | GD |
|---|---|---|---|---|---|---|---|---|
| Wilstermann | 18 | 6 | 6 | 0 | 0 | 23 | 14 | +15 |
| Real Potosí | 15 | 6 | 5 | 0 | 1 | 14 | 10 | +9 |
| Universitario | 11 | 6 | 3 | 2 | 1 | 18 | 17 | +4 |
| Real Mamoré | 9 | 6 | 3 | 0 | 3 | 18 | 18 | +1 |

== Group C ==
| Team | Pts | Pld | W | D | L | GF | GA | GD |
|---|---|---|---|---|---|---|---|---|
| Oriente Petrolero | 14 | 6 | 4 | 2 | 0 | 23 | 14 | +8 |
| San José | 13 | 6 | 4 | 1 | 1 | 14 | 10 | +5 |
| Ciclón | 10 | 6 | 3 | 1 | 2 | 18 | 17 | +3 |
| Aurora | 9 | 6 | 3 | 0 | 3 | 18 | 18 | 0 |

== Group D ==
| Team | Pts | Pld | W | D | L | GF | GA | GD |
|---|---|---|---|---|---|---|---|---|
| Blooming | 13 | 4 | 3 | 1 | 0 | 23 | 14 | +8 |
| The Strongest | 11 | 4 | 2 | 2 | 1 | 14 | 10 | +5 |
| Independiente Petrolero | 6 | 4 | 1 | 2 | 1 | 18 | 17 | +3 |

== Semi-final ==
- In this Round Oriente Petrolero Qualified as the best loser

| Team 1 | Agg. | Team 2 | 1st leg | 2nd leg |
|---|---|---|---|---|
| Bolivar | 6–5 | Oriente Petrolero | 2–2 | 4–3 |
| Wilstermann | 1–0 | Blooming | 0–0 | 1–2 |

== First leg ==
January 27
15:30

| Bolívar | 2 – 2 | Oriente Petrolero |
|---|---|---|
| Ferreira 90' (50) | | Peña 61' (70) |

Estadio Hernando Siles, La Paz
Attendance: 40,000
Referee: Óscar Maldonado

January 27
20:00

| Blooming | 0 – 0 | Wilstermann |

Estadio Ramón Tahuichi Aguilera, Santa Cruz
Attendance: 33,000

== Second leg ==
January 30
20:30

| Oriente Petrolero | 3 – 4 | Bolívar |
|---|---|---|
| Marcelo Aguirre 10'; Joselito Vaca 35'; Jhasmani Campos 84' | | William Ferreira 5' (27), 40' (89) |

Estadio Ramón Tahuichi Aguilera, Santa Cruz
Attendance: 36,000

January 30
21:00

| Wilsterman | 4 – 3 | Blooming |
|---|---|---|
| Carmelo Angulo 40' |

Estadio Félix Capriles, Cochabamba
Attendance: 31,000

== Final ==
| Team 1 | Agg. | Team 2 | 1st leg | 2nd leg |
|---|---|---|---|---|
| Bolivar | 4–3 | Wilsterman | 2–1 | 2–2 |

== First leg ==
February 1
20:00

| Wilsterman | 2 – 2 | Bolivar |
|---|---|---|
| Santos Amador 47'; Christian Ovelar 29' | | Jair Reinoso 25'; William Ferreira 40' |

Estadio Félix Capriles, Cochabamba
Attendance: 35,000
Referee: Rene Ortube

== Second leg ==
February 4
16:00

| Bolívar | 2 – 1 | Wilsterman |
|---|---|---|
| Ferreira 80' (50) | | Francisco Esteche 61' |

Estadio Hernando Siles, La Paz
Attendance: 44,000
Referee: Rene Ortube

== Copa Aerosur del Sur ==
Teams that were 2nd qualified to this tournament.

=== Semi-final ===
| Team 1 | Agg. | Team 2 | 1st leg | 2nd leg |
|---|---|---|---|---|
| Real Potosí | 2–0 | La Paz | 2–0 | 0–0 |
| San José | 5–3 | The Strongest | 1–2 | 4–1 |

=== Final ===
| Team 1 | Agg. | Team 2 | 1st leg | 2nd leg |
|---|---|---|---|---|
| Real Potosí | 4–6 | San José | 3–2 | 1–4 |
