= 2006 Copa Aerosur & del Sur =

Copa Aerosur
- Season: 2006
- 2006 Copa Aerosur: Blooming (1st title)

The 2006 Copa Aerosur was the 4th edition of the Copa Aerosur, the annual Bolivian football tournament held in La Paz, Cochabamba and Santa Cruz, sponsored by AeroSur airline.

Blooming won the tournament and their first title after beating The Strongest in the final 6–1 on aggregate.

== First stage ==
Team 1	Agg.	Team 2	1st leg	2nd leg
Oriente Petrolero	3–0	Jorge Wilstermann	3–0	0–0
Blooming	4–3	San José	2–2	2–1
Aurora	3–5	The Strongest	3–3	0–2
Real Potosí	2–0	Bolívar	2–0	0–0
Universitario	1–3	Unión Central	1–0	0–3
Destroyers	2–3	La Paz	2–0	0–3

== Second stage ==
Team	Pts	Pld	W	D	L	GF	GA	GD
Oriente Petrolero	27	12	9	0	4	23	14	+14
Blooming	25	12	8	1	3	14	10	+9
The Strongest	21	12	7	0	4	18	17	+4
Real Potosí	18	12	6	0	6	18	18	+1
Unión Central	17	12	5	2	4	13	17	-2
La Paz	10	12	3	2	7	17	26	-4

== Semi-final ==
Team 1	Agg.	Team 2	1st leg	2nd leg
Oriente Petrolero	2–3	The Strongest	2–0	0–3
Blooming	4–0	Real Potosi	2–0	2–0

== Final ==
=== First leg ===
27 February
20:00

Blooming	1 – 0	The Strongest
Dimas Da Silva 40'

Estadio Ramón Tahuichi Aguilera, Santa Cruz de la Sierra, Bolivia
Attendance: 40,000
Referee: René Ortubé

=== Second leg ===
1 March
20:00

The Strongest	1 – 5	Blooming
Roger Suarez 10'		Dimas Da Silva 30' (45), Raúl Gutierrez 60' (74)Ricardo Verduguez 88'

Estadio Hernando Siles, La Paz, Bolivia
Attendance: 49,000
Referee: René Ortubé
- Away goal rules.
