= 2007 Copa Aerosur & del Sur =

Copa Aerosur
- Season: 2007
- 2007 Copa Aerosur: The Strongest (1st title)

The 2007 Copa Aerosur, was an instance of the annual Bolivian football tournament held in La Paz, Cochabamba and Santa Cruz, sponsored by the AeroSur airline.

This event was the 5th such event. In this tournament teams from the 2nd and 3rd divisions participated. The winner team was given free tickets on Aerosur to play their games during the tournament (and for the remainder of 2007) and $10,000, the runners-up-up receiving $5,000. The runners-up won a 75% discount in airfares and the other participants accessed a 50% discount on tickets by agreeing to display the airline's logo on their uniforms.

The 2007 version of the cup had three novelties: ties were defined by penalty shoot-out in all instances of the tournament; the implementation of a parallel U-18 tournament U-18; a rematch to be played between its champion and the champion of the Copa Aerosur del Sur and 2 foreign clubs.

== 1st qualifying round ==
Team 1	Agg.	Team 2	1st leg	2nd leg
31 de Octubre	4–3	Beni AFB	3–2	1–1
Litoral	2–1	Always Ready	1–1	1–0
ABB	2–0	Universitario (P)	0–0	2–0
Bolivar Nimbles	0–1	Chaco Petrolero	0–0	0–1
Cristal	3–2	Ferroviario	2–2	1–0
Universidad de Santa Cruz	1–3	Municipal (T)	1–1	0–2
Real Charcas	2–4	Unión Central	2–2	0–2
Universitario de Potosi	3–4	Real Cochabamba	1–2	2–2

== 2nd qualifying round ==
- Teams from the 2006 Copa Simón Bolívar qualified for this round.
- For the first time Tahuichi Academy participated in this competition.

Team 1	Agg.	Team 2	1st leg	2nd leg
31 de Octubre	2–5	Cristal	2–4	0–1
Fraternidad Tigres	1–3	Litoral	1–1	0–2
Ciclón	3–1	ABB	2–1	1–0
Oruro Royal	0–1	Guabirá	0–0	0–1
Chaco Petrolero	2–1	Unión Central	1–1	1–0
Vaca Díez	0–3	Real Cochabamba	0–2	0–1
Nacional Potosi	5–2	Municipal (T)	4–0	1–2
Universitario (B)	2–3	Tahuichi Academy	2–2	0–1

== 3rd qualifying round ==
- Only teams from the LPFB qualified for this round, not the winners of the 2nd Round.

Team 1	Agg.	Team 2	1st leg	2nd leg
Tahuichi Academy	3–2	Guabirá	1–1	2–1
Nacional Potosi	2–4	Ciclón	2–1	1–3
Real Cochabamba	0–1	Cristal	0–0	0–1
Chaco Petrolero	2–0	Litoral	1–0	1–0

== Bracket ==
First knockout round
Cristal	1	0	1
Oriente Petrolero	1	3	4
La Paz	2	2	4
Ciclón	3	2	5
Jorge Wilstermann	0	0	0
Bolivar	1	0	1
Universitario	0	1	1
Real Mamoré	0	3	3
Aurora	3	0	3
Chaco Petrolero	4	3	7
Blooming	3	0	3
Tahuichi Academy (a)	2	1	3
Real Potosí	0	0	0
San José	1	1	2
The Strongest	1	2	3
Destroyers	1	0	1

Quarter-finals
Oriente Petrolero	4	2	6
Ciclón	1	0	1
Bolívar	2	2	4
Real Mamoré	2	1	3
Chaco Petrolero	3	1	4
Tahuichi Academy	2	0	2
San José	1	0	1
The Strongest	0	3	3

Semi-finals
Oriente Petrolero	4	2	6
Bolivar	4	1	5
Chaco Petrolero	0	2	2
The Strongest	2	3	5

Final
Oriente Petrolero	2	0	2
The Strongest	2	1	3

=== Semi-final ===
Team 1	Agg.	Team 2	1st leg	2nd leg
Oriente Petrolero	6–5	Bolívar	4–4	2–1
The Strongest	5–2	Chaco Petrolero	2–0	3–2

=== Final ===
Team 1	Agg.	Team 2	1st leg	2nd leg
The Strongest	3–2	Oriente Petrolero	2–2	1–0

== Copa Aerosur del Sur ==
La Paz FC won the final against Real Potosi, 2–1 in the Copa Aerosur del Sur.
