= 1998 Copa Bolivia =

Tournament details
- Country: Bolivia
- Teams: 31

Final positions
- Champions: Club Jorge Wilstermann (3rd title)
- Runners-up: Club Blooming

The 1998 Copa Bolivia was the 23rd edition of the Copa Bolivia. The defending champions, Oriente Petrolero, qualified to the group stage, while The Strongest qualified to the play-off round as the previous year's runner-up.

== First qualifying round ==
Team 1	Agg.	Team 2	1st leg	2nd leg
Always Ready	1–0	Club Litoral	0–0	1–0
Bolivar Nimbles	2–4	31 de Octubre	2–2	0–2

== Second qualifying round ==
Team 1	Agg.	Team 2	1st leg	2nd leg
Always Ready	3–2	Deportivo Cristal	2–0	1–2
31 de Octubre	5–0	Universitario de Potosi	4–0	1–0
Universidad de Santa Cruz	2–0	Real Charcas	1–0	1–0
Chaco Petrolero	3–4	Ferroviario F.C	2–4	1–0
ABB	1–2	Primero de Mayo	1–0	0–2
Enrique Happ	3–2	Mariscal Braun	2–2	1–0

== Third qualifying round ==
Team 1	Agg.	Team 2	1st leg	2nd leg
31 de Octubre	3–1	Always Ready	2–0	1–1
Universidad de Santa Cruz	1–0	Nacional Potosí	1–0	0–0
Club Aurora	1–2	Ferroviario F.C	1–0	0–2
Primero de Mayo	4–2	Enrique Happ	2–0	2–2
Club Blooming	5–2	Club Destroyers	3–0	2–2
Club Bolívar	3–5	Club Atlético Ciclón	2–1	1–4
Fraternidad Tigres	1–0	Guabirá	0–0	1–0
Club Independiente Petrolero	2–3	La Paz F.C.	0–0	2–3
Mariscal Santa Cruz	1–2	Municipal Real Mamoré	0–0	1–2
Club Bamin Real Potosí	6–2	Oruro Royal	4–0	2–2
Club Deportivo San José	1–0	Club Stormers San Lorenzo	1–0	0–0
Club Unión Central	2–1	Club Universitario	2–1	0–0
Club Jorge Wilstermann	5–4	Club Callejas	3–3	2–1

== Play-off round ==
Team 1	Agg.	Team 2	1st leg	2nd leg
Fraternidad Tigres	1–0	Universidad de Santa Cruz	0–0	1–0
Club Jorge Wilstermann	5–3	La Paz F.C.	2–3	3–0
Ferroviario F.C	2–3	The Strongest	2–2	0–1
Primero de Mayo	3–7	Club Blooming	3–4	1–3
Club Unión Central	0–3	Club Atlético Ciclón	0–0	0–3
Club Bamin Real Potosí	4–0	Club Deportivo San José	4–0	0–0
31 de Octubre	0–1	Municipal Real Mamoré	0–0	0–1

== Group stage ==
=== Group A ===
Standings

Pos	Team	Pld	W	D	L	GF	GA	GD	Pts
1	Jorge Wilstermann (A)	6	5	1	0	17	8	+9	16
2	Oriente Petrolero (A)	6	3	1	2	14	10	+4	10
3	The Strongest	6	1	1	4	4	8	−4	4
4	Fraternidad Tigres	6	1	1	4	4	13	−9	4

Updated to match(es) played on September 17, 2009. Source: La Liga
Rules for classification: 1) points; 2) goal difference; 3) number of goals scored.
(A) Advance to a further round

Results

Home \ Away	WIL	OPE	STR	FTS
Jorge Wilstermann		4–3	3–1	4–0
Oriente Petrolero	3–3		2–0	4–1
The Strongest	0–1	2–0		1–1
Fraternidad Tigres	1–2	0–2	1–0	

Updated to match(es) played on January 25, 2010. Source: La Liga
Legend: Blue = home team win; Yellow = draw; Red = away team win.

=== Group B ===
Standings

Pos	Team	Pld	W	D	L	GF	GA	GD	Pts
1	Blooming (A)	6	4	1	1	16	10	+6	13
2	Unión Central (A)	6	2	1	3	11	10	+1	7
3	Real Potosí	6	2	1	3	6	12	−6	7
4	Real Mamoré	6	2	1	3	11	13	−2	7

Updated to match(es) played on September 17, 2009. Source: La Liga
Rules for classification: 1) points; 2) goal difference; 3) number of goals scored.
(A) Advance to a further round

Results

Home \ Away	BLO	RPO	RMA	UNI
Blooming		4–2	3–1	2–0
Real Potosí	3–4		1–0	2–1
Real Mamoré	1–1	2–1		2–1
Unión Central	3–2	2–2	4–0	

Updated to match(es) played on January 25, 2010. Source: La Liga
Legend: Blue = home team win; Yellow = draw; Red = away team win.

== Semi-final ==
Team 1	Agg.	Team 2	1st leg	2nd leg
Jorge Wilstermann	5–3	Unión Central	4–2	1–1
Blooming	3–2	Oriente Petrolero	2–2	1–0

July 31
19:30

Blooming	2 – 2	Oriente Petrolero
Julio César Cortéz (Bolivian footballer) 42' (88)		Jefferson Gottardi 11'; Ronald Arana 76' (90)

Estadio Ramón Tahuichi Aguilera, Santa Cruz
Attendance: 40,400

July 31
19:30

Club Jorge Wilstermann	4 – 2	Club Unión Central
Demetrio Angola 12'; Carmelo Angulo 34'; Marco Antonio Barrero 76'; Carlos Cárdenas 86'		Juan Pinedo 23'; Alejandro Quispe 56'

Felix Capriles, Cochabamba
Attendance: 30,000

Second leg

August 22
19:30

Oriente Petrolero	0 – 1	Blooming
		Julio César Cortéz (Bolivian footballer) 11'

Estadio Ramón Tahuichi Aguilera, Santa Cruz
Attendance: 37,000

August 31
19:30

Club Unión Central	1 – 1	Club Jorge Wilstermann
Alejandro Quispe 66'		Carmelo Angulo 84'

Estadio IV Centenário, Tarija
Attendance: 16,000

== Final ==
Team 1	Agg.	Team 2	1st leg	2nd leg
Club Jorge Wilstermann	2–1	Club Blooming	1–1	1–0

First leg

October 11
19:30

Blooming	1 – 1	Club Jorge Wilstermann
José Milton Melgar 52'		Demetrio Angola 81'

Estadio Ramón Tahuichi Aguilera, Santa Cruz
Attendance: 45,000

Second leg

October 22
19:30

Club Jorge Wilstermann	1 – 0	Blooming
Carmelo Angulo 33'

Felix Capriles, Cochabamba
Attendance: 40,000
