= 2005 Copa Aerosur =

Copa Aerosur
- Season: 2005
- 2005 Copa Aerosur: Oriente Petrolero (2nd title)

Following are the results of the 2005 Copa Aerosur, the Bolivian football tournament held in La Paz, Cochabamba and Santa Cruz, sponsored by AeroSur airline.

== Qualifying round ==
Team 1	Agg.	Team 2	1st leg	2nd leg
Real America	4–2	Oruro Royal	3–1	1–1
Cristal	2–3	Independiente Petrolero	1–2	1–1
Mariscal Braun	4–3	Ciclon	2–1	2–1
1 de Mayo	1–2	Nacional Potosí	1–1	0–1

== Bracket ==
First knockout round
Union Central	1	2	3
San José	1	1	2
Destroyers	1	0	1
La Paz	0	0	0
Oriente Petrolero	1	3	4
Blooming	1	1	2
Universitario	1	0	2
Real Potosí	1	2	3
Bolivar	2	0	2 (5)
The Strongest	0	2	2 (4)
Real America	3	1	4
Independiente Petrolero	3	2	5
Mariscal Braun	1	3	4
Nacional Potosí	0	2	2
Aurora	0	2	2
Jorge Wilstermann	1	2	3

Quarter-finals
Union Central	1	1	2
Destroyers	1	2	3
Oriente Petrolero	2	3	5
Real Potosi	2	1	3
Bolivar	4	2	6
Independiente Petrolero	1	1	2
Mariscal Braun	1	0	1
Jorge Wilstermann	1	2	3

Semi-finals
Destroyers	1	0	1
Oriente Petrolero	3	2	5
Bolivar	2	2	4
Jorge Wilstermann	0	1	1

Final
Oriente Petrolero (a)	4	1	5
Bolivar	0	5	5

=== Semi-final ===
Team 1	Agg.	Team 2	1st leg	2nd leg
Oriente Petrolero	5–1	Destroyers	3–1	2–0
Bolívar	4–0	Jorge Wilstermann	2–0	2–1

=== Final ===
==== First leg ====
27 February
20:00

Oriente Petrolero	4–0	Bolívar
Miguel Hoyos 20' (80); Carlos Villagra 60', 18'

Estadio Ramón Tahuichi Aguilera, Santa Cruz de la Sierra, Bolivia
Attendance: 37,000
Referee: René Ortubé

==== Second leg ====
2 March
20:00

Bolívar	5–1	Oriente Petrolero
Diego Cabrera 26' (45); Marco Sandy 50' (80), 89'		Miguel Hoyos 20'

Estadio Hernando Siles, La Paz, Bolivia
Attendance: 40,000
Referee: René Ortubé
- Away goal rules.
