= Juan Carlos Arce =

Bolivian footballer (born 1985)

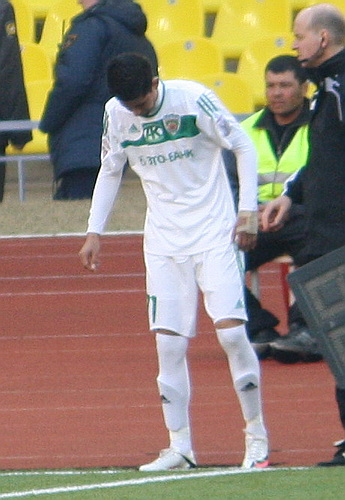
- Arce with Terek Grozny in 2010

Personal information
- Full name: Juan Carlos Arce Justiniano
- Date of birth: 10 April 1985 (age 41)
- Place of birth: Santa Cruz, Bolivia
- Height: 1.76 m (5 ft 9 in)
- Positions: Forward; winger

Youth career
- Tahuichi Academy
- Oriente Petrolero

Senior career*
Years	Team	Apps	(Gls)
2003–2010	Oriente Petrolero	147	(24)
2006	→ Portuguesa (loan)	3	(0)
2007	→ Corinthians (loan)	18	(2)
2007–2008	→ Al-Arabi (loan)	24	(3)
2008	→ Seongnam Ilhwa Chunma (loan)	10	(0)
2009	→ Sport Recife (loan)	15	(4)
2010	Terek Grozny	20	(0)
2011–2012	Oriente Petrolero	33	(9)
2012–2020	Bolívar	235	(72)
2021–2022	Always Ready	61	(9)
2023–2024	Blooming	56	(3)

International career
2004–2022	Bolivia	88	(15)
- * Club domestic league appearances and goals

Juan Carlos Arce Justiniano (born 10 April 1985) is a Bolivian former professional footballer who played as a forward or winger. His last professional club was Blooming in the Bolivian first division.

== Club career ==
=== Oriente Petrolero ===
Born in Santa Cruz de la Sierra, Arce started his career at Bolivia's famous youth academy Academia Tahuichi. In 2003 aged 18, Arce signed for Bolivian Primera División club Oriente Petrolero. In his debut season Arce played fifteen games scoring two goals and won the 2003 Copa Aerosur in the process. Following his debut season, Arce played forty four games in 2004 – cementing his position in the first team – scoring seven goals and helped the team to a Semi-finals finish in the Copa Aerosur.

Arce played fifteen games, scoring just three during the 2009 opening start to the season.

After less than one year after leaving the club, Arce returned and played two more season including both 2011 Bolivian Primera División and 2011–12 Bolivian Primera División. Arce scored six goals in his remaining seasons with the club playing only 23 games. Arce played a total of 170 games for Albiverdes scoring 30 goals.

=== Brazil ===
In 2005, Arce played a total of 39 games scoring eight and helped the team win its second Copa Aerosur in three years. In 2006, after playing 34 games for Oriente Petrolero – scoring four times – Arce was loaned out to Série B club Portuguesa, playing only in non-league fixtures.

The following season (2007) in January 2007, Arce was loaned out again to Série A club Corinthians. Arce played eighteen games for the Timão scoring just two goals. Despite having a good season with the Corinthians, Arce couldn't help the team avoid relegation, and with the arrival of a new manager he was removed from the squad. Arce also scored two more goals playing in the 2007 Copa do Brasil

Following the start of the 2009 Bolivian Primera División, Arce was loaned out to Brazil for a third time joining 2008 Copa do Brasil champions, and Série A club Sport Recife for a sixth-month period with the option to require his rights. Playing fifteen games and scoring four goals, Sport Recife finished last and were relegated to Série B.

=== Asia ===
After multiple loans out to Brazil, Arce was loaned out to the Qatar Stars League club Al-Arabi for the 2007–08 season. However, he found the language and the way of life there difficult, despite managing to score 3 goals.

Arce, once again was loaned out, this came after playing one season in Qatar. He joined Seongnam FC for the remainder of the 2008 K League season, however, Arce played just ten games before leaving the club and returning to Bolivia. After a few months in his home country, he joined Sport Recife of Brazil in 2009, making 15 appearances and scoring 4 goals.

=== Terek Grozny ===
In 2010, Arce joined Russian Premier League side Terek Grozny signing a three-year deal. After only 20 games with the side and finishing just above relegation, Arce left the club and returned to Bolivia.

=== Bolívar ===
In January 2012, Arce signed for Bolivian Primera División club Bolivar. Arce made his debut for the club in the 2012 Copa Libertadores. Coming on as substitute in the 63rd minute replacing Jhasmani Campos in there 1–1 draw against Chile an side Universidad Católica in Estadio San Carlos de Apoquindo, Santiago.

Arce scored his first goal for Bolívar in 2012 against La Paz scoring in the 89th minute after coming on as a substitute.

== International career ==
Arce made his debut on 6 July 2004 in the 2004 Copa América against host nation Peru in a 2–2 draw at the National Stadium, Lima. Since his debut in 2004, Arce has been capped over 70 times for Bolivia, scoring a total of 12 goals.

Arce has competed at five Copa América tournaments (2004, 2007, 2011, 2016, 2021), and played through five World Cup qualifying campaigns (2006, 2010, 2014, 2018, 2022).

== Career statistics ==
Scores and results list Bolivia's goal tally first, score column indicates score after each Arce goal.

List of international goals scored by Juan Carlos Arce
No.	Date	Venue	Opponent	Score	Result	Competition	Ref.
1	15 November 2006	Estadio Hernando Siles, La Paz, Bolivia	El Salvador	2–0	5–1	Friendly	
2	26 June 2007	Estadio Polideportivo de Pueblo Nuevo, San Cristóbal, Venezuela	Venezuela	1–0	2–2	2007 Copa América	
3	21 November 2007	Estadio Polideportivo de Pueblo Nuevo, San Cristóbal, Venezuela	Venezuela	2–1	3–5	2010 FIFA World Cup qualification	
4	9 February 2011	Mardan Sports Complex, Antalya, Turkey	Latvia	1–2	1–2	Friendly	
5	10 August 2011	Estadio Ramón Tahuichi Aguilera, Santa Cruz de la Sierra, Bolivia	Panama	1–0	1–3	Friendly	
6	18 November 2014	Estadio Hernando Siles, La Paz, Bolivia	Venezuela	3–2	3–2	Friendly	
7	12 November 2015	Estadio Hernando Siles, La Paz, Bolivia	Venezuela	2–0	4–2	2018 FIFA World Cup qualification	
8	24 March 2016	Estadio Hernando Siles, La Paz, Bolivia	Colombia	1–2	2–3	2018 FIFA World Cup qualification	
9	7 June 2016	Camping World Stadium, Orlando, United States	Panama	1–1	1–2	Copa América Centenario	
10	28 March 2017	Estadio Hernando Siles, La Paz, Bolivia	Argentina	1–0	2–0	2018 FIFA World Cup qualification	
11	5 September 2017	Estadio Hernando Siles, La Paz, Bolivia	Chile	1–0	1–0	2018 FIFA World Cup qualification	
12	12 November 2020	Estadio Hernando Siles, La Paz, Bolivia	Ecuador	1–0	2–3	2022 FIFA World Cup qualification	
13	16 November 2021	Estadio Hernando Siles, La Paz, Bolivia	Uruguay	1–0	3–0	2022 FIFA World Cup qualification	
14	16 November 2021	Estadio Hernando Siles, La Paz, Bolivia	Uruguay	3–0	3–0	2022 FIFA World Cup qualification	
15	21 January 2022	Estadio Olímpico Patria, Sucre, Bolivia	Trinidad and Tobago	1–0	5–0	Friendly	
