= 2003 Copa Aerosur =

Copa Aerosur
- Season: 2003
- 2003 Copa Aerosur: Oriente Petrolero (1st title)

Following are the results of the 2003 Copa Aerosur, the Bolivian football tournament held in La Paz, Cochabamba and Santa Cruz, sponsored by AeroSur airline.

The 2003 Edition started in January and ended in February. The final was Buenos Aires, Argentina.

== First round ==
Team 1	Agg.	Team 2	1st leg	2nd leg
Bolivar Nimbles	1–3	Chaco Petrolero	2–0	2–2
Warnes	1–0	Litoral (O)	0–0	1–0

== Second round ==
Team 1	Agg.	Team 2	1st leg	2nd leg
Always Ready	2–3	Alemán	1–2	1–1
Oruro Royal	4–2	Mariscal Braun	3–1	1–1
Vaca Diez	5–1	Callejas	3–0	2–1
Warnes	(a)4–4	Ciclón	3–0	1–4
Stormers San Lorenzo	3–0	1 de Mayo	0–0	3–0
White Star	1–3	Fancesa	0–0	1–3
Nacional Potosí	4–3	Union Tarija	2–3	2–0
Universitario (P)	2–2(a)	Cristal	2–1	0–1
Fraternidad Tigres	5–0	Universitario (C)	3–0	2–0
Ferrocarril	1–3	Chaco Petrolero	1–2	0–1
Union Maestranza	2–0	Club Sabaya	1–0	1–0
Zuraca	3–2	Oriente B	1–2	2–0
Arauco Prado	0–3	Enrique Happ	0–3	0–0
Ferroviario	6–0	Guadalquivir	4–0	2–0
Nueva Cliza	1–0	Sabaya	0–0	1–0
Perequije	3–1	Universitario (T)	1–0	1–1
Real Cochabamba	0–2	Cala Cala	0–0	0–2
Ayacucho	3–5	San Antonio	3–2	0–3
Universidad de Santa Cruz	1–0	Real Charcas	1–0	0–0
15 de Abril	1–1(a)	16 de Julio	1–1	0–0

== Third round ==
Team 1	Agg.	Team 2	1st leg	2nd leg
Stormers San Lorenzo	0–1	Fraternidad Tigres	0–1	0–0
Bolivar	4–1	La Paz	2–0	2–1
Oriente Petrolero	5–3	Nacional Potosí	2–0	3–3
The Strongest	2–0	Enrique Happ	1–0	1–0
Chaco Petrolero	1–3	Blooming	1–0	0–3
Warnes	1–2	Iberoamericana	1–1	0–1
Unión Central	0–1	San José	0–1	0–0
Guabirá	3–2	Independiente Petrolero	2–0	1–2
Cristal	1–3	Real Potosi	1–1	0–2
Vaca Diez	2–2(a)	Oruro Royal	2–1	0–1
Alemán	0–4	Fancesa	0–4	0–0
Union Maestranza	2–3	Jorge Wilstermann	2–1	0–2
Zuraca	0–1	Ferroviario	0–0	0–1
Aurora	2–0	Perequije	0–0	2–0
Cala Cala	(a)3–3	San Antonio	2–0	1–3
Universidad de Santa Cruz	0–2	16 de Julio	0–0	0–2

== Bracket ==
Round of 16
1	Fraternidad Tigres	3	1	4
16	Blooming	3	2	5
8	Iberoamericana	1	1	2
9	Oriente Petrolero	3	2	5
5	The Strongest	1	2	3
12	Ferroviario	1	0	1
4	Bolivar	1	3	4
13	Cala Cala	0	2	2
6	Jorge Wilstermann	4	0	4
11	16 de Julio	2	2	6
3	Aurora	1	0	1
14	Oruro Royal	3	2	5
7	San José	3	0	1
10	Guabirá	0	3	2
2	Real Potosi	1	2	3
15	Fancesa	1	2	6

Quarter-finals
Blooming	1	3	3
Oriente Petrolero	2	3	4
The Strongest	0	0	0
Bolivar	0	3	3
Jorge Wilstermann	0	3	3
Aurora	1	0	3
San Jose	2	1	3
Real Potosi	0	1	1

Semi-finals
Oriente Petrolero (a)	0	3	3
Bolivar	0	3	3
Jorge Wilstermann	0	4	4
San Jose	1	1	2

Final
Oriente Petrolero	1
Jorge Wilstermann	0

== Quarter finals ==
Team 1	Agg.	Team 2	1st leg	2nd leg
Oriente Petrolero	5–4	Blooming	2–1	3–3
Aurora	1–3	Jorge Wilstermann	1–0	0–3
Bolívar	3–0	The Strongest	0–0	3–0
San José	3–1	Real Potosí	2–0	1–1

== Semi-final ==
Team 1	Agg.	Team 2	1st leg	2nd leg
Bolívar	3–3(a)	Oriente Petrolero	3–3	0–0
San José	2–4	Jorge Wilstermann	1–0	1–4

== Final ==
March 17
19:00

Oriente Petrolero	1 – 0	Jorge Wilstermann
Claudio Biaggio 60'

Estadio Nueva España, Buenos Aires, Argentina
Attendance: 1,000
