= 2008 Copa Simón Bolívar (Bolivia) =

Copa Simón Bolívar
- Season: 2008
- Champions: Nacional Potosi (1st Title)
- Promoted: Nacional Potosi; Primero de Mayo (Relegation/promotion playoff)
- Matches: 40

The tournament started in 1960, initially only champions from La Paz, Cochabamba, Oruro and Santa Cruz participated, in later years teams from other associations started joining the cup, and the tournament eventually also had runner-up's participating.

Until 1976, due to the lack of a nationwide league, the cup determined the national champion and representative teams for the Copa Libertadores. With the creation of the Liga de Fútbol Profesional Boliviano, the Bolivian FA stopped organizing the tournament.

Finally in 1989 the tournament was resurrected, with the same format of having both champions and runner-up from each association, but this time each regional league was the 2nd tier on the football pyramid so the champion was supposed to be awarded a place in the professional league. Previously the last placed team in the 1st division was replaced by the regional champion of its department. However that practice was kept until 1993 when finally the champion was awarded a spot in the top league.

The competition format changes frequently, in 2008, the team were divided into 3 groups of 6 teams each, to save costs, geographically close teams were teamed up and played on a home-away round-robin basis, with group 1 consisting of teams from La Paz, Oruro and Cochabamba; group 2 with teams from Potosí, Chuquisaca and Tarija, and group 3 with teams from Santa Cruz, Beni and Pando. The top 2 placed teams advanced to the next round, now playing play-offs on home-away basis, the 3 winners and the best loser advanced to the semifinals and then the final.

== First phase ==
=== Group A ===
Team	Pts	Pld	W	D	L	GF	GA	GD
Fancesa	21	10	6	3	2	5	13	+10
Club Independiente Petrolero	17	10	5	2	3	18	11	+17
Deportivo Crystal	13	10	3	3	4	13	12	+1
Fraternida Tigres	9	10	2	3	5	14	15	-1
Universitario	5	10	1	2	7	9	17	-8
31 de Octubre	5	10	1	2	7	11	22	-11

=== Group B ===
Team	Pts	Pld	W	D	L	GF	GA	GD
Club Atlético Ciclón	22	10	6	2	2	25	5	+15
Club Destroyers	18	10	5	3	3	22	10	+12
Enrique Happ	13	10	3	1	5	8	8	0
Club San Lorenzo	11	10	3	2	6	7	12	-4
Oruro Royal	8	10	2	2	7	8	15	-7
Universitario de Potosi	5	10	1	3	8	5	16	-11

=== Group C ===
Team	Pts	Pld	W	D	L	GF	GA	GD
Nacional Potosi	24	10	6	1	3	18	10	+8
Primero de Mayo	20	10	5	3	2	13	9	+4
Universidad de Pando	16	10	4	4	2	9	8	+1
Real Charcas	15	10	3	5	3	7	11	-4
Universidad De Beni	10	10	2	3	3	5	13	-8
Vaca Diez	8	10	1	5	3	7	15	-8

== Quarter finals ==
Team 1	Agg.	Team 2	1st leg	2nd leg
Club Independiente Petrolero	2–5	Club Atlético Ciclón	1–1	1–4
Fancesa	0–2	Nacional Potosi	0–1	0–1
Club Destroyers	6–5	Club Primero De Mayo	3–2	3–3

== Semi-final ==
In this round Club Primero De Mayo qualified as the best loser

Team 1	Agg.	Team 2	1st leg	2nd leg
Club Atlético Ciclón	0–1	Primero De Mayo	0–1	0–0
Club Destroyers	1–2	Nacional Potosi	1–0	0–2

1st Leg

September 20
15:30

Club Atlético Ciclón	0 – 1	Primero De Mayo
		Luis Parada 40'

Estadio IV Centenário, Tarija
Attendance: 14,000

September 23
16:30

Club Destroyers	1 – 0	Nacional Potosi
Edu Monteiro 12'

Estadio Ramón Tahuichi Aguilera, Santa Cruz
Attendance: 12,000

2nd Leg

October 5
18:30

Primero De Mayo	0 – 0	Club Atlético Ciclón

Estadio Gran Mamoré, Beni
Attendance: 19,000

October 6
19:30

Nacional Potosi	2 – 0	Club Destroyers
Ronald Gutiérrez 65'; Cristino Jara 85'

Estadio Victor Agustín Ugarte, Potosí
Attendance: 22,000

== Final ==
Team 1	Agg.	Team 2	1st leg	2nd leg
Nacional Potosi	3–2	Primero De Mayo	2–1	1–1

October 17
20:30

Nacional Potosi	2 – 1	Primero De Mayo
Ronald Gutiérrez 13'; Nicolás Canalis 45'		Julio Cesar 56'

Estadio Victor Agustín Ugarte, Potosí
Attendance: 24,000
November 1
16:30

Primero De Mayo	1 – 1	Nacional Potosi
John Carlos 67'		Hernán Coimbra 23'

Estadio Gran Mamoré, Beni
Attendance: 20,000

Copa Simon Bolivar
2008 Bolivian Football Regional Leagues
Nacional Potosi
1st Title
