= Helmut Gutiérrez =

Bolivian footballer (born 1984)

Personal information
- Full name: Helmut Enrique Gutiérrez Zapana
- Date of birth: 2 July 1984 (age 42)
- Place of birth: La Paz, Bolivia
- Height: 1.81 m (5 ft 11 in)
- Position: Midfielder

Senior career*
| Years | Team | Apps | (Gls) |
| 2007–2009 | La Paz | 78 | (12) |
| 2010 | Real Potosí | 36 | (10) |
| 2011 | Nacional Potosí | 33 | (3) |
| 2012–2013 | La Paz | 14 | (2) |
| 2013–2014 | Sport Boys Warnes | 37 | (1) |
| 2014–2015 | Blooming | 28 | (0) |
| 2015–2016 | Sport Boys Warnes | 37 | (10) |
| 2016–2017 | The Strongest | 1 | (0) |
| 2017–2018 | Oriente Petrolero | 24 | (0) |
| 2019 | Club San José | 30 | (4) |
| 2020–2021 | Blooming | 11 | (0) |
| 2022 | Universitario de Sucre | 13 | (0) |
| 2022 | Club Independiente Petrolero | 9 | (0) |
| Total | | 351 | (42) |

International career
| 2009–2010 | Bolivia | 3 | (0) |
- * Club domestic league appearances and goals

Helmut Enrique Gutiérrez Zapana (born 2 July 1984) is a Bolivian former professional footballer who played as a midfielder.

== Club career ==
Gutiérrez previously played for La Paz, Real Potosí, Nacional Potosí and Blooming.

== International career ==
Gutiérrez made his debut in the Bolivia national team on 9 September 2009, during a 2010 World Cup Qualifying game at home against Ecuador.
