= Juan Carlos Sánchez (footballer, born 1985) =

Bolivian footballer (born 1985)

Personal information
- Full name: Juan Carlos Sánchez Ampuero
- Date of birth: March 1, 1985 (age 41)
- Place of birth: Cochabamba, Bolivia
- Height: 1.79 m (5 ft 10 in)
- Position: Defender

Team information
- Current team: Universitario de Sucre

Senior career*
Years	Team	Apps	(Gls)
2003–2005	Aurora		
2005–2006	The Strongest		
2006–2008	Aurora		
2008–2012	Blooming	28	(2)
2012–2015	Real Potosí	100	(3)
2015–2016	Universitario de Sucre	15	(0)
- * Club domestic league appearances and goals

Juan Carlos Sánchez (born March 1, 1985) is a Bolivian former footballer who played as a defender in the Liga de Futbol Profesional Boliviano.
