= Ricardo Sagardia =

Bolivian footballer (born 1993)

Personal information
- Full name: Ricardo Hugo Sagardia Medrano
- Date of birth: March 4, 1993 (age 33)
- Place of birth: Bolivia
- Height: 1.78 m (5 ft 10 in)
- Position: Defender

Team information
- Current team: Bolívar

Senior career*
Years	Team	Apps	(Gls)
2011-pres	Bolívar	14	(0)
- * Club domestic league appearances and goals

Ricardo Hugo Sagardia Medrano (born March 4, 1993, in Bolivia) is a Bolivian footballer who since 2011 has played defender for Bolívar.

== Club career statistics ==
Club performance			League		Cup		League Cup		Total	
Season	Club	League	Apps	Goals	Apps	Goals	Apps	Goals	Apps	Goals
League		Apertura and Clausura			Copa Aerosur		Total			
2011/12	Bolívar	Liga de Fútbol Profesional Boliviano	3	0	-	-	-	-	3	0
2013/14	Bolívar	Liga de Fútbol Profesional Boliviano	4	0	-	-	-	-	4	0
2014/5	Bolívar	Liga de Fútbol Profesional Boliviano	7	0	-	-	-	-	7	0
Total			13	0	-	-	-	-	13	0
