= Luis Sillero =

Argentine footballer

Personal information
- Full name: Luis Hernán Sillero
- Date of birth: June 23, 1978 (age 48)
- Place of birth: Salta, Argentina
- Height: 1.76 m (5 ft 9 1/2 in)
- Position: Striker

Senior career*
Years	Team	Apps	(Gls)
2001–2002	Gimnasia y Tiro de Salta	36	(11)
2002–2003	Atlético Tucumán	23	(6)
2003	Atlético Talleres	10	(1)
2004	Unión Central	41	(17)
2005–2006	Wilstermann	48	(31)
2006–2007	Real Cartagena	21	(3)
2007	Bolívar	15	(8)
2008	Real Potosí	33	(16)
2009	Universitario	36	(20)
2010	Blooming	31	(5)
- * Club domestic league appearances and goals as of September 25, 2010

Luis Hernán Sillero (born June 23, 1978, in Salta) is a retired Argentine football striker. The last professional club he played for is Bolivian side Blooming.

== Club career ==
Sillero started playing professionally at Gimnasia y Tiro de Salta. Later, he had spells with Atlético Tucumán and Atlético Talleres also in Argentina. In 2004, he made his debut in the Liga de Fútbol Profesional Boliviano with Unión Central before joining Wilstermann the following year. In 2006, Sillero relocated to Colombia and signed for Real Cartagena where he played until mid-2007. Then he moved back to Bolivia to defend Bolívar. Next season he transferred to Real Potosí to help the team face both, the domestic tournament and Copa Libertadores. In 2009 Sillero transferred to Universitario. After a year in Sucre, Sillero was signed by Blooming for the 2010 season.
