= List of Oriente Petrolero seasons =

This is a list of all seasons played by Oriente Petrolero in Bolivian and South American football, from their inaugural season in 1956 Oriente Petrolero season to their last completed season. It details their record in every major competition entered, as well as the top goalscorers for each season. Top scorers in bold were also the top scorers in the English league that season.

The club have won every major domestic honour, and have never been relegated to Second Division. In total, Oriente Petrolero have won five League Championships (the Copa Simón Bolívar and its successor, La Liga), two Aerosur Cups, one Playoffs and eleven Santa Cruz Association Championships. The club have also won various lesser honours, including one Cuadrangular Internacional del Peru.
