= Oscar Araúz =

Bolivian footballer (born 1980)

Personal information
- Full name: Oscar Mario Araúz Soleto
- Date of birth: August 23, 1980 (age 46)
- Place of birth: Santa Cruz de la Sierra, Bolivia
- Height: 1.72 m (5 ft 8 in)
- Position: Striker

Youth career
- Tahuichi Academy

Senior career*
Years	Team	Apps	(Gls)
2005–2006	Destroyers	40	(7)
2007	The Strongest	14	(0)
2008	Blooming	13	(4)
2009	Real Mamoré	28	(6)
2010	The Strongest	3	(0)
2011–2012	Guabirá	43	(6)
- * Club domestic league appearances and goals as of May 29, 2011

Oscar Mario Araúz Soleto (born August 23, 1980, in Santa Cruz de la Sierra) is a retired Bolivian football striker. Also known as "Pony", Araúz has played for Destroyers, Blooming, The Strongest, Real Mamoré and Guabirá in his professional career.
