= Marcos Andia =

Bolivian football midfielder (born 1988)

Personal information
- Full name: Jorge Marcos Andia Pizarro
- Date of birth: February 8, 1988 (age 38)
- Place of birth: Santa Cruz de la Sierra, Bolivia
- Height: 1.78 m (5 ft 10 in)
- Position: Defensive midfielder

Team information
- Current team: Universitario de Sucre
- Number: 15

Youth career
- 2005–2006: Blooming

Senior career*
| Years | Team | Apps | (Gls) |
| 2006–2011 | Blooming | 126 | (3) |
| 2012–2013 | → Petrolero (loan) | 16 | (1) |
| 2013–2014 | Blooming | 5 | (0) |
| 2014–2015 | Petrolero | 19 | (0) |
| 2015– | Universitario de Sucre | 67 | (1) |
- * Club domestic league appearances and goals as of October 2, 2013

Jorge Marcos Andia Pizarro (born February 8, 1988, in Santa Cruz de la Sierra) is a Bolivian football midfielder who currently plays for first division team Universitario de Sucre.

Andia won the 2009 Clausura title with Blooming.

== Club titles ==
| Season | Club | Title |
|---|---|---|
| 2009 (C) | Blooming | Liga de Fútbol Profesional Boliviano |
