= Abdón Reyes =

Bolivian footballer (born 1981)

Personal information
- Full name: Abdón Reyes Cardozo
- Date of birth: October 15, 1981 (age 45)
- Place of birth: Tarija, Bolivia
- Height: 1.65 m (5 ft 5 in)
- Position: Midfielder

Senior career*
Years	Team	Apps	(Gls)
2005	Universitario	?	(?)
2006–2007	San José	68	(0)
2008–2012	Bolívar	130	(7)
2012–2016	San José	146	(16)
2016	Club Quebracho	?	(?)
2017	San José	11	(0)

International career
2008–2012	Bolivia	13	(0)
- * Club domestic league appearances and goals as of 4 April 2018

Abdón Reyes Cardozo (born October 15, 1981) is a Bolivian football midfielder who plays most recently played for San José.

== Club career ==
Reyes began his career in 2005 with newly promoted team Universitario de Sucre; however, he wasn't given the opportunity to play during the entire season. In 2006, he transferred to Club San José, where his career took off. Reyes demonstrated to be a quality player, and it took popular club Bolívar nearly two years to realized the tremendous potential he had and signed him for the 2008 season.

== International career ==
During 2008 he received his first call-up to the senior national team. His debut occurred on June 14, 2008, at home against Chile for the World Cup qualifiers. He has earned a total of 13 caps and represented his country in 9 FIFA World Cup qualification matches.

== Honours ==
Universitario

- Copa Simón Bolívar: 2005

San José

- Primera División: 2007-C

Bolívar

- Primera División: 2009-A, 2011-AD
