= Santos Amador =

Bolivian footballer (born 1982)

Personal information
- Full name: Santos Amador Quispe
- Date of birth: April 6, 1982 (age 44)
- Place of birth: Santa Cruz de la Sierra, Bolivia
- Height: 1.83 m (6 ft 0 in)
- Position: Defender

Team information
- Current team: Nacional Potosí
- Number: 5

Senior career*
Years	Team	Apps	(Gls)
2002–2003	Guabirá	44	(0)
2004–2006	San José	66	(5)
2007–2008	Real Potosí	53	(6)
2009	Wilstermann	25	(2)
2010	The Strongest	15	(0)
2011–2018	Nacional Potosí		

International career^{‡}
2007–2011	Bolivia	5	(0)
- * Club domestic league appearances and goals as of August 24, 2010 ‡ National team caps and goals as of July 10, 2011

Santos Amador Quispe (born April 6, 1982, in Santa Cruz de la Sierra) is a Bolivian professional footballer currently playing for Nacional Potosí in Bolivia. He plays as a defender and has played for San José, Guabirá, Real Potosí and Wilstermann, all in Bolivia. He also won a national title in 2007. Agent Player Argentine Marcos Garzia (Garziafutbol).
