= Carlos Sabja =

Bolivian footballer (born 1990)

Personal information
- Full name: Carlos Eduardo Sabja Añez
- Date of birth: January 14, 1990 (age 36)
- Place of birth: Santa Cruz de la Sierra, Bolivia
- Height: 1.66 m (5 ft 5 in)
- Position: Midfielder

Youth career
- 1999–2007: Tahuichi Academy
- 2007–2008: Benfica

Senior career*
Years	Team	Apps	(Gls)
2008–2009	Blooming	30	(4)
2009	→ Guabirá (loan)	8	(0)
2010	→ Real Mamoré (loan)	36	(0)
- * Club domestic league appearances and goals as of November 25, 2010

Carlos Eduardo Sabja Añez (born January 14, 1990, in Santa Cruz de la Sierra) is a Bolivian football midfielder who is currently a free agent. His last club in the Bolivian league was Real Mamoré.

== Club career ==
Sabja began his football career at a young age attending the well-known Tahuichi Academy. In May 2007, he was loaned to Portuguese club Benfica to train in the youth sector after he awoke the interest of some European scouts while playing with the Bolivian U-17 squad. After one year under evaluation, Sabja didn't make the final cut; therefore, the club decided to let him go. He then returned to Bolivia and signed with first division club Blooming. In short time, he has demonstrated to be a talented prospect with a bright future. In 2009, he had a brief spell with Guabirá, team which gained promotion to first division. In 2010, he was loaned to Real Mamoré.
