= Dustin Maldonado =

Bolivian footballer (born 1990)

Personal information
- Full name: Dustin Maldonado Antelo
- Date of birth: March 18, 1990 (age 36)
- Place of birth: Santa Cruz de la Sierra, Bolivia
- Height: 1.73 m (5 ft 8 in)
- Position: Defender

Team information
- Current team: Real Tomayapo
- Number: 4

Senior career*
Years	Team	Apps	(Gls)
2010–2012	Blooming	23	(0)
2012–2013	→ Nacional Potosí (loan)	8	(0)
2013–2015	Blooming	50	(3)
2015–2016	Real Potosí	42	(3)
2016–2017	Nacional Potosí	27	(4)
2018	Universitario de Sucre	39	(2)
2019	Sport Boys	20	(0)
2020	Real Potosí	13	(1)
2021	Mojocoya FC	9	(1)
2022	Real Tomayapo	31	(0)
2023	Independiente Petrolero	5	(0)
2023	C.D. Vaca Díez	12	(1)
2024–	Real Tomayapo	5	(0)
- * Club domestic league appearances and goals

Dustin Maldonado Antelo (born March 18, 1990) is a Bolivian football defender who currently plays for Real Tomayapo in the Liga de Fútbol Profesional Boliviano.

== International career ==
He was named in Bolivia's senior squad for a 2018 FIFA World Cup qualifier against Colombia in March 2016.

== Club career statistics ==
Club performance			League		Cup		League Cup		Total	
Season	Club	League	Apps	Goals	Apps	Goals	Apps	Goals	Apps	Goals
League		Apertura and Clausura			Copa Sudamericana		Total			
2010	Blooming	Liga de Fútbol Profesional Boliviano	14	1	-	-	1	0	15	1
2011	Blooming	Liga de Fútbol Profesional Boliviano	6	0	-	-	-	-	6	0
2011/12	Blooming	Liga de Fútbol Profesional Boliviano	3	0	-	-	-	-	3	0
2012/13	Nacional Potosí	Liga de Fútbol Profesional Boliviano	8	0	-	-	-	-	8	0
2013/14	Blooming	Liga de Fútbol Profesional Boliviano	36	3	-	-	-	-	36	3
2014/15	Blooming	Liga de Fútbol Profesional Boliviano	14	0	-	-	-	-	14	0
2015/16	Real Potosí	Liga de Fútbol Profesional Boliviano	2	0	2	0	2	0	6	0
Total			83	4	2	0	1	0	86	4
