= Pedro Zabála =

Bolivian footballer (born 1983)

Personal information
- Full name: Pedro Zabála Pereira
- Date of birth: June 25, 1983 (age 43)
- Place of birth: Trinidad, Bolivia
- Height: 1.70 m (5 ft 7 in)
- Position: Defender

Team information
- Current team: Real Mamoré

Senior career*
| Years | Team | Apps | (Gls) |
| 2006–2009 | Universitario | 100 | (2) |
| 2010 | Wilstermann | 16 | (0) |
| 2011– | Real Mamoré | 3 | (0) |

International career
| 2006–2007 | Bolivia | 2 | (0) |
- * Club domestic league appearances and goals as of June 28, 2011

Pedro Zabála Pereira (born June 25, 1983, in Trinidad) is a Bolivian football defender. He currently plays for Real Mamoré in the Liga de Fútbol Profesional Boliviano.

== National team ==
Zabála made his debut for the Bolivia national team on November 15, 2006, in a friendly match against El Salvador (5–1). He played the full 90 minutes.
