= Carmelo Angulo =

Bolivian footballer (born 1980)

Personal information
- Full name: Carmelo Angulo Mendoza
- Date of birth: May 23, 1980 (age 46)
- Place of birth: Cobija, Bolivia
- Height: 1.76 m (5 ft 9 1/2 in)
- Position: Midfielder

Senior career*
Years	Team	Apps	(Gls)
1998–2000	Wilstermann	39	(3)
2001	→ Independiente Petrolero (loan)		
2002	Wilstermann	26	(3)
2003–2004	Aurora	51	(13)
2005–2006	Bolívar	80	(14)
2007	Blooming	30	(3)
2008	The Strongest	15	(6)
2009	La Paz	19	(2)
2009	Wilstermann	11	(1)
2010	The Strongest	24	(0)
2011	Real Mamoré	9	(1)
2011–2012	Nacional Potosí	21	(3)
2012–2013	Aurora	18	(2)

International career
2004–2006	Bolivia	7	(0)
- * Club domestic league appearances and goals as of June 28, 2011

Carmelo Angulo Mendoza (born May 23, 1980, in Cobija) is a retired Bolivian football midfielder.

== Club career ==
Angulo had two spells in Wilstermann. During the first period with the aviadores, he won a national championship. Subsequently, he would also play for Independiente Petrolero, Aurora, Bolívar, Blooming and The Strongest.

== International career ==
Angulo also played for the Bolivia national team between 2004 and 2005, appearing in 7 games.

== Honours ==
- Liga de Fútbol Profesional Boliviano: 4

2000 (Wilstermann), 2005 AD, 2006 C (Bolívar), 2008 C (The Strongest)
