= Germán Leonforte =

Argentine footballer

Personal information
- Full name: Germán Gabriel Leonforte
- Date of birth: 12 January 1981 (age 45)
- Place of birth: Rosario, Argentina
- Height: 1.84 m (6 ft 0 in)
- Position: Right back

Senior career*
Years	Team	Apps	(Gls)
2002–2005	Rosario Central	43	(5)
2006	Huracán	20	(1)
2007	Nacional	15	(0)
2007	Coquimbo Unido	14	(1)
2008–2009	Aurora	45	(7)
2009–2010	Dorados de Sinaloa	24	(2)
2010–2012	Ferro Carril Oeste	15	(1)
2012-XXXX	Sarmiento de Leones		
- * Club domestic league appearances and goals

Germán Gabriel Leonforte (born 12 January 1981 in Rosario) is an Argentine football defender.

== Honours ==
Season	Club	Title
2008 (C)	Aurora	Liga de Fútbol Profesional Boliviano
