= Copa Aerosur =

- Founded: 18 February 2002
- Country: Bolivia
- Confederation: CONMEBOL
- Level on pyramid: 2
- Current champions: Bolivar (Copa Aerosur & del Sur 2011)
- Most championships: Oriente Petrolero; Blooming; Bolivar; Jorge Wilstermann (2 titles each)
- Current: Copa Aerosur & del Sur 2011

The Aerosur Cup was a Bolivian football tournament held in the La Paz, Cochabamba and Santa Cruz, sponsored by Aerosur airline. The original idea was to make AeroSur Cup a tournament for the winning teams from previous seasons in the whole country of (Bolivia), this idea changed. Later on, the Cup became a tournament between the 6 best teams of the main cities: Wilstermann, Oriente Petrolero, Blooming, The Strongest and Bolivar, and Aurora. In 2008 the tournament was split into two competitions: Copa Aerosur and Copa Aerosur del Sur. The South Aerosur Cup was created due to requests from several Southern teams that were not taken into account in the original Cup. Some major competitors in the Cup are La Paz FC (Runners-up in 2 tournaments in 2008), Real Potosi (2007 Apertura Champions), Universitario (2008 Apertura Champions), San Jose (1995 Liga and 2007 Apertura Champions), which can’t be considered small teams, as they have won 3 of the last 9 tournaments played in the Major League of Bolivian Soccer.

The Aerosur Champion Cup and the South Aerosur Cup are widely anticipated tournaments by Bolivian soccer fans. This is because they are the first two tournaments that open the season and they are also an opportunity to see new players and reinforcements hired by each team.

== List of Championship ==
=== Copa Aerosur ===
Ed.	Season	Champion (title count)	Runner-up	Semifinalists
1	2003	Oriente Petrolero (1)	Jorge Wilsterman	Bolivar; San José
2	2004	Jorge Wilstermann (1)	Aurora	The Strongest; Oriente Petrolero
3	2005	Oriente Petrolero (2)	Bolivar	Destroyers; Jorge Wilstermann
4	2006	Blooming (1)	The Strongest	Oriente Petrolero; Real Potosi
5	2007	The Strongest (1)	Oriente Petrolero	Bolivar; Chaco Petrolero
6	2008	Blooming (2)	Jorge Wilsterman	Bolivar; Universitario de Sucre
7	2009	Bolivar (1)	Jorge Wilsterman	Blooming; Oriente Petrolero
8	2010	Bolivar (2)	Jorge Wilsterman	Blooming; The Strongest
9	2011	Jorge Wilsterman (2)	Aurora	Oriente Petrolero; The Strongest

=== Copa Aerosur del Sur ===
Ed.	Season	Champion (title count)	Runner-up	Semifinalists
1	2006	San José (1)	Universitario de Sucre	Real Potosí; Unión Central
2	2007	La Paz (1)	Real Potosí	Universitario de Sucre; Destroyers
3	2008	Real Potosí (1)	Universitario de Sucre	La Paz; Guabira
4	2009	San José (2)	Universitario de Sucre	La Paz; The Strongest
5	2010	Guabirá (1)	Real Potosí	San José; Universitario
6	2011	Universitario de Sucre (1)	Real Potosí	San José; Nacional Potosí

== Results by team (Copa Aerosur) ==
Club	Wins	Last final won	Runners-up	Last final lost
Jorge Wilstermann	2	2011	4	2010
Oriente Petrolero	2	2005	1	2007
Bolívar	2	2010	1	2005
Blooming	2	2008	0	
The Strongest	1	2007	1	2006
Aurora	0		2	2011

== Results by team (Copa Aerosur del Sur) ==
Club	Wins	Last final won	Runners-up	Last final lost
San José	2	2009	0	
Guabirá	1	2010	0	
Universitario de Sucre	1	2011	0	
Real Potosí	1	2008	3	
La Paz	1	2007	3	
