= David Akologo =

Ghanaian footballer (born 1997)

Personal information
- Full name: David Akologo Kifo
- Date of birth: 15 November 1997 (age 28)
- Place of birth: Accra, Ghana
- Height: 1.84 m (6 ft 0 in)
- Position: Goalkeeper

Team information
- Current team: Aurora
- Number: 99

Youth career
- 2013–2014: Mighty Jets
- 2015: Vodafone FC
- 2016: Ajax Accra

Senior career*
Years	Team	Apps	(Gls)
2017	Mighty Jets		
2018–2019	Arauco Prado		
2019–2021	Cochabamba		
2021	Aurora	6	(0)
2022	Enrique Happ		
2022	Deportivo FATIC		
2023–	Aurora	26	(0)
- * Club domestic league appearances and goals as of 14:51, 20 June 2024 (UTC)

David Akologo Kifo (born 15 November 1997) is a Ghanaian footballer who plays as a goalkeeper for Aurora. He has been called up to represent Bolivia internationally.

== Early life ==
Akologo was born in 1997 in Accra. He has a brother.

== Career ==
In 2022, Akologo signed for Bolivian side Deportivo FATIC. In 2023, he signed for Bolivian side Aurora.

== Style of play ==
Akologo operates as a goalkeeper. He has been described as having "calm ball-playing abilities".

== Personal life ==
Akologo is fluent in the English language. He has regarded Germany internationals Manuel Neuer and Marc-André ter Stegen and Cameroon international André Onana as his football role models.
