= Ronald Gutiérrez =

Bolivian footballer (born 1979)

Personal information
- Full name: Ronald Gutiérrez Flores
- Date of birth: December 2, 1979 (age 46)
- Place of birth: Tarija, Bolivia
- Height: 1.70 m (5 ft 7 in)
- Position: Midfielder

Senior career*
Years	Team	Apps	(Gls)
1999–2006	The Strongest	246	(13)
2007	La Paz	42	(9)
2008	Bursaspor	6	(1)
2009	Bolívar	17	(0)
2009	Nacional Potosí	9	(0)
2010	Guabirá	35	(2)

International career^{‡}
2007–2008	Bolivia	3	(0)
- * Club domestic league appearances and goals as of July 18, 2010 ‡ National team caps and goals as of June 18, 2008

Ronald Gutiérrez Flores (born December 2, 1979, in San José de Pocitos, Tarija) is a retired Bolivian football midfielder.

Gutiérrez's former clubs are Chaco Petrolero, The Strongest, La Paz F.C., Bolívar and Guabirá in his native country. He also played briefly for the Turkish club Bursaspor.

== Club career ==
Gutiérrez began his career in the summer of 1999 when he signed for The Strongest. After nearly eight years and over 240 appearances for the atigrados, he transferred to La Paz F.C. before the 2007 season. That year he was declared as the best player in Bolivian first division, leading La Paz F.C. to a berth in the Copa Libertadores 2008. His good form was rewarded with a transfer to Bursaspor from the Turkcell Super League in 2008. After a short spell in Turkey, Gutiérrez returned to Bolivia in January 2009 and signed a two-year contract with Club Bolívar. With the arrival of a new manager, his presence was no longer needed, and the club decided to loan him to Nacional Potosí for the remaining of the 2009 season, and subsequently to Guabirá in 2010.

== International career ==
Since 2007, Gutiérrez has been capped for the Bolivia national team in 3 occasions, all of those FIFA World Cup qualification matches.
