= Regis de Souza =

Brazilian footballer

Personal information
- Full name: Regis Adair Quaresma de Souza
- Date of birth: January 25, 1982 (age 44)
- Place of birth: Sapucaia, Brazil
- Positions: Striker; winger

Team information
- Current team: The Strongest
- Number: 9

Youth career
- 2000: Grêmio

Senior career*
Years	Team	Apps	(Gls)
2001–2006	Cerro Corá	?	(?)
2007	Oriente Petrolero	32	(8)
2008	La Paz F.C.	32	(13)
2009	Al-Hilal Omdurman	14	(9)
2009–2010	→ La Paz F.C. (loan)	7	(3)
2010–	→ San José (loan)	23	(11)
2011–	The Strongest		
- * Club domestic league appearances and goals as of October 8, 2010

Regis Adair Quaresma de Souza (born January 25, 1982, in Sapucaia) is a professional football player from Brazil, who currently plays as a striker and winger in the Liga de Fútbol Profesional Boliviano for The Strongest

De Souza is a left-footed forward, who has break-away speed, can shoot with either foot, scores goals with headers, and is an expert at free kicks. As a teenager, de Souza was a teammate of Ronaldinho in the lower divisions of Gremio. Before arriving in Sudan, de Souza played for the Bolivian football club La Paz F.C.

== Club career ==
=== 2007 season ===
During the 2007 season, De Souza played for Oriente Petrolero in the Bolivian First Division, scoring eight goals (five goals in Apertura 2007 and three goals in Clausura 2007).

=== 2008 season ===
De Souza signed with La Paz F.C. on January 8, 2008, and made his Copa Libertadores 2008 debut against F.C. Atlas on January 30, 2008, in Guadalajara, Mexico, fulfilling a childhood dream.

In the first six games of Apertura 2008, De Souza scored six goals for La Paz F.C. and was the leading scorer in the Bolivian First Division. There was discussion in the local sports media that he might be signed by a European team in June. After a bad game against Club Universitario, De Souza was benched for the next game. However, De Souza returned to the starting lineup against Club San Jose and scored one goal in helping his team break a three-game losing streak, defeating San Jose 5–2. After eighteen games in Apertura 2008, De Souza has scored nine goals.

=== 2009 season ===
De Souza signed with Al-Hilal on January 6, 2009, for a four-year contract.

== Media coverage ==
- Tres clubes de Arabia tras Regis de Souza; Mauricio Gonzalez negocia
- VIDEO Highlights of La Paz FC defeat of Club San Jose, 5–2 on April 27, 2008 (Regis De Souza scores goal and assists on another goal)
- VIDEO Interview with La Paz FC President Mauricio Gonzalez regarding Regis De Souza on April 1, 2008
- De Souza y su gran momento en La Paz: el brasileno es figura y goleador del "azulgrana' y del Apertura.
- VIDEO of De Souza scoring a right-footed goal against Wilstermann on March 2, 2008
- VIDEO of De Souza scoring two goals against San Jose on January 24, 2008
- La Paz se trae los goles de De Souza
