= Iván Huayhuata =

Bolivian footballer (born 1989)

Personal information
- Full name: Iván Enrique Huayhuata Romero
- Date of birth: 9 March 1989 (age 37)
- Place of birth: Cochabamba, Bolivia
- Height: 1.71 m (5 ft 7 in)
- Position: Defender

Team information
- Current team: Club Aurora
- Number: 7

Senior career*
Years	Team	Apps	(Gls)
2008–2013	Club Aurora		
2013–2014	Nacional Potosí	26	(1)
2015–2017	Club Jorge Wilstermann	57	(2)
2018–2019	Club Aurora	71	(9)
2020	Club Atlético Palmaflor	24	(1)
2021	Club Aurora	21	(5)
2022	Universitario de Vinto	39	(12)
2023	Guabirá	10	(0)
2023	Club Aurora	9	(0)
2024	Universitario de Vinto	13	(0)
2024–2025	San Antonio Bulo Bulo	24	(1)
2025–	Club Aurora	13	(3)
- * Club domestic league appearances and goals as of 30 December 2025

Iván Huayhuata (born 9 March 1989) is a Bolivian football defender who plays for Club Aurora.
