= Raúl Gutiérrez (Bolivian footballer) =

Bolivian footballer (born 1976)

Personal information
- Full name: Raúl Gutiérrez Sagredo
- Date of birth: 8 January 1976 (age 50)
- Place of birth: Santa Cruz de la Sierra, Bolivia
- Height: 1.70 m (5 ft 7 in)
- Position: Midfielder

Youth career
- 1993–1994: Libertad

Senior career*
Years	Team	Apps	(Gls)
1995–2004	Blooming	273	(27)
2005	→ Aurora (loan)	22	(5)
2006	Blooming	29	(4)
2007	→ Destroyers (loan)	17	(4)
2008	Blooming	5	(0)

International career
1994–2003	Bolivia	18	(0)

Managerial career
- 2010–2015: Blooming (assistant)
- 2010: Blooming (interim)
- 2015: Blooming (interim)
- 2023: Real Tomayapo (youth)
- 2024–2026: Blooming (youth)
- 2026: Blooming (interim)
- 2026: Blooming
- * Club domestic league appearances and goals

Raúl Gutiérrez Sagredo (born 8 January 1976 in Santa Cruz de la Sierra) is a Bolivian football manager and former player who played as a midfielder.

== Club career ==
Nicknamed "Pelecho", Gutiérrez began his career at a young age playing for second division club Libertad. In 1995, he transferred to Blooming, where he spent the next nine years of his professional career including two national championships obtained in 1998 and 1999.

In 2005, Gutiérrez was loaned to Cochabamba's club Aurora, but returned to Blooming the following season. During 2007, he played for Destroyers, and despite having a favorable season, he got injured and could not finish the tournament. The next year, while playing at Blooming for the third time in his career, he announced his retirement from the sport because he suffered from a fear of flying, a problem he was not able to overcome and got worse as the years went on.

== International career ==
He was in the Bolivia national team between 1999 and 2003. He capped for Bolivia in 18 international matches.

== Club titles ==
Season	Club	Title
1998	Blooming	Liga de Fútbol Profesional Boliviano
1999	Blooming	Liga de Fútbol Profesional Boliviano
