= Joselito Vaca =

Bolivian footballer (born 1982)

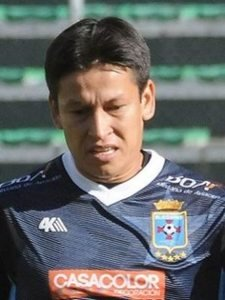

Personal information
- Full name: José Vaca Velasco
- Date of birth: August 12, 1982 (age 44)
- Place of birth: Santa Cruz de la Sierra, Bolivia
- Height: 1.65 m (5 ft 5 in)
- Position: Attacking midfielder

Team information
- Current team: Blooming
- Number: 10

Youth career
- 1994–1998: Tahuichi Academy

Senior career*
Years	Team	Apps	(Gls)
1999–2000	Oriente Petrolero	52	(11)
2001–2003	Dallas Burn	72	(5)
2004	MetroStars	22	(1)
2005–2008	Blooming	153	(26)
2009–2012	Oriente Petrolero	93	(17)
2012	Deportivo Pasto	17	(1)
2013–2023	Blooming	247	(22)

International career
2001	Bolivia U-20	4	(0)
2002–2016	Bolivia	56	(2)
- * Club domestic league appearances and goals as of 15:47, 19 December 2019 (UTC)

José "Joselito" Vaca Velasco (born August 12, 1982, in Santa Cruz de la Sierra) is a Bolivian footballer. He currently plays as an attacking midfielder for Blooming in the Liga de Fútbol Profesional Boliviano (Bolivian Professional League).

== Club career ==
Vaca joined Oriente Petrolero in 1999 at the age of 17, and played 33 games for the team his first year. In 2000, he was named the Best Player in the Bolivian League, as he helped lead Petrolero to a second-place finish in the league and concomitant Copa Libertadores berth.

Following the 2000 season, Vaca signed with Major League Soccer, and was selected fifth overall by the Dallas Burn in the 2001 MLS SuperDraft. His second season was Vaca's best, as he played right midfield for the Burn, and was named to the All-Star team. Vaca played a significant number of minutes in 2003.

A trade to the MetroStars for a conditional draft pick in the 2003 offseason did little to change Vaca's performance. In four years in MLS, his numbers are average at best: just six goals and 18 assists in league play. He returned to Bolivia, signing for Blooming in 2005. After four years and one national championship with the millonarios, he decided to go back where all began, rejoining Oriente Petrolero in January 2009. In March 2012, Vaca was signed by Colombian first division side Deportivo Pasto, team which he played for the rest of that year. In January 2013 he returned to Bolivia and signed with Blooming for his second spell with the club.

== Bolivia national team ==
Although Vaca was initially a hugely touted Bolivian prospect, his appearances with the Bolivia national team have cooled with his tepid performance in MLS. Since returning to Bolivia, he has been called back to the national team after years. Since 2002, Vaca has earned a total of 54 caps for Bolivia with 2 goals scored.

He was a member of the Bolivia national team in 2007 Copa América and 2011 Copa América.

== Career statistics ==
=== International goals ===
#	Date	Venue	Opponent	Score	Result	Competition
1.	29 March 2005	Estadio Hernando Siles, La Paz, Bolivia	Venezuela	3–1	Win	2006 FIFA World Cup qual.
2.	28 March 2007	Ellis Park, Johannesburg, South Africa	South Africa	0–1	Win	Friendly match
Correct as of 9 March 2017

== Honours ==
Blooming

- Liga de Fútbol Profesional Boliviano: 2005 (A)
- Copa Aerosur: 2006, 2008
- Copa Cine Center: 2015

Oriente Petrolero

- Liga de Fútbol Profesional Boliviano: 2010 (C)
