= Ricardo Verduguez =

Bolivian footballer (born 1989)

Personal information
- Full name: Ricardo Verduguez
- Date of birth: July 28, 1989 (age 37)
- Place of birth: Santa Cruz de la Sierra, Bolivia
- Height: 1.68 m (5 ft 6 in)
- Positions: Left back; midfielder

Youth career
- 1998–2005: Tahuichi Academy

Senior career*
Years	Team	Apps	(Gls)
2005–2009	Blooming	130	(7)
2010	→ Guabirá (loan)	37	(2)
2011–2013	Blooming	78	(1)
2013–2014	Guabirá	22	(0)
2014–2015	San José	27	(2)
2015–2016	Nacional Potosí	37	(5)
2016	Wilstermann	3	(0)
2017	Nacional Potosí	1	(0)
2017–2018	Universitario de Sucre	30	(0)

International career
2007–2009	Bolivia U-20	6	(0)
2007	Bolivia	1	(0)
- * Club domestic league appearances and goals as of 16:18, 19 September 2020 (UTC)

Ricardo Verduguez (born July 28, 1989) is a retired Bolivian football defender who lastly played for Universitario de Sucre in the Bolivian first division. He also played professionally for Blooming, Guabirá, San José, Nacional Potosí and Wilstermann.

== Club career ==
Verduguez started his career at the amateur level with Tahuichi Academy. In 2005, he made his debut in first division football with hometown club Blooming at only 16 years of age.

Scouts from Europe are keeping an eye on Verduguez because of the potential he has shown. He has been likened to attacking Brazilian full-backs Cafu and Roberto Carlos, indicating that he may have a big future in football.

== International career ==
Thanks to his impressive displays and good form he played for Bolivia U21 in the 2007 South American U-20 Championship held in Paraguay, and again during the 2009 version of the tournament hosted by Venezuela. He made his debut with the senior Bolivia national team on October 17, 2007, against Colombia for the 2010 World Cup qualification round in La Paz.

== Club titles ==
Season	Club	Title
2005 (A)	Blooming	Liga de Fútbol Profesional Boliviano
2009 (C)	Blooming	Liga de Fútbol Profesional Boliviano
