= AeroSur =

Bolivian airline

Compañía Boliviana de Transporte Aéreo Privado Aerosur S.A.
IATA	ICAO	Call sign
5L	RSU	AEROSUR
- Founded: April 1992; 34 years ago
- Commenced operations: August 24, 1992
- Ceased operations: May 17, 2012; 14 years ago
- Hubs: Santa Cruz de la Sierra
- Secondary hubs: La Paz-El Alto
- Frequent-flyer program: Club AeroSur
- Subsidiaries: AeroSur Cargo; AeroSur Paraguay
- Fleet size: 6
- Destinations: 16
- Headquarters: Santa Cruz de la Sierra, Bolivia
- Key people: Humberto Roca (CEO)
- Website: aerosur.com

AeroSur (legally incorporated as Compañía Boliviana de Transporte Aéreo Privado Aerosur, S.A.) was the second largest privately owned airline in Bolivia, headquartered in Santa Cruz de la Sierra. It operated a domestic and international flight network from its main hub at Viru Viru International Airport to major cities in Bolivia and destinations in South America, the United States and Spain. Founded in April 1992 taking advantage of the deregulation of Bolivia's air transport, it started flying on 24 August that year between Santa Cruz and Potosí.

For most of its operational history, AeroSur's main fleet was the Boeing 727-200. The airline even operated the type for its services to Miami, requiring a refueling stop due to its range. They were gradually replaced with more modern Boeing 737 aircraft. Additionally, the airline operated single Boeing 747 and 767 aircraft for its long-haul destinations to North America and Europe.

In 2008, AeroSur became Bolivia's flag carrier following the demise of the country's main airline, Lloyd Aéreo Boliviano, which ceased operations in 2010. In 2012, the airline declared bankruptcy and ceased operations shortly afterward; it had 1,200 employees at the time.

== History ==
=== Establishment and early operations ===
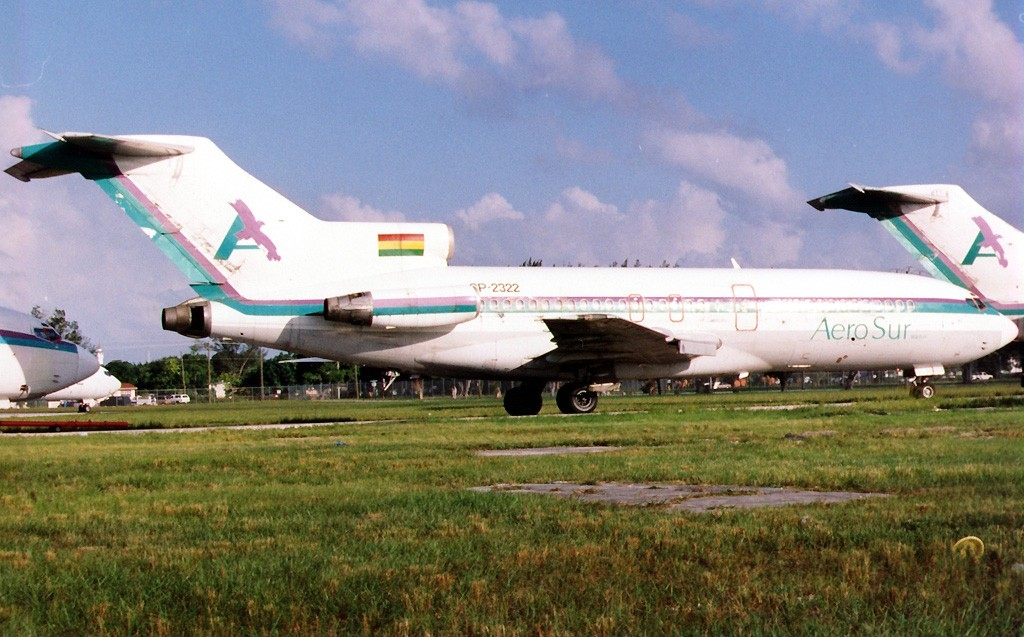
A Boeing 727-100 from AeroSur featuring the airline's first livery

AeroSur was established in April 1992, following the deregulation of the Bolivian airline market, which had been previously controlled by the then state-owned airline Lloyd Aéreo Boliviano (LAB), Bolivia's flag carrier, which had been in service since 1925, making it South America's second oldest airline.

On August 24, 1992, AeroSur commenced its operations with an inaugural flight between Santa Cruz de la Sierra and Potosí using a Let L-410 Turbojet short-range aircraft. During the first year of its operations, the airline had carried around 400,000 passengers. Regular revenue flights on regional routes soon followed as the airline then acquired several Fairchild Swearingen Metroliner and British Aerospace 146 aircraft. Over the following years, AeroSur acquired larger Boeing 727-200 airliners, which allowed the airline to expand its network of operations by adding international flights and helped the airline increase the number of passengers transported.

=== Expansion ===
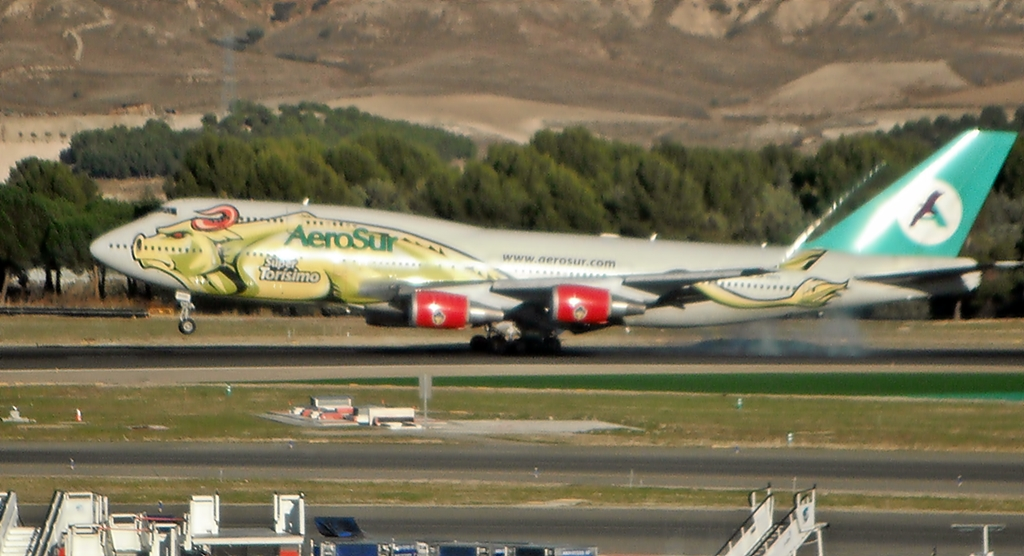
An AeroSur's Boeing 747-400 landing at Madrid-Barajas Airport

During the 2000s AeroSur renewed and expanded its fleet, introducing larger aircraft of the types Boeing 747 and Boeing 757, which made the inauguration of long-haul flights possible. In 2002, President Hugo Banzer declared the airline the flag carrier of the Republic of Bolivia (línea aérea bandera); in that same year AeroSur became the first airline in Bolivia to offer business and first class flights. In 2004, AeroSur started to operate nostalgic flights with a Douglas C-117 to tourist destinations such as the Salar de Uyuni and Rurrenabaque, both of which are internationally recognized.

When Lloyd Aéreo Boliviano went bankrupt in 2007, AeroSur became the largest airline of Bolivia and the only one with intercontinental flights (to Central and North America as well as to Europe). In 2009, the domestic fleet of aging Boeing 727s was replaced by second-hand, though more modern, Boeing 737 Classic airliners, and looked to start a Peruvian subsidiary, however that project was suspended indefinitely.

The subsidiary dubbed AeroSur Paraguay was planned to operate two Boeing 737-200 aircraft of mainline AeroSur. The further development of the project was postponed in mid-2009 pending Paraguayan governmental approval, and later deferred indefinitely. In 2010, AeroSur added five new aircraft to its fleet: three Boeing 737-300s, one Boeing 737-400 and a Boeing 767-200ER.

=== Bankruptcy ===
On March 31, 2012, the airline suspended operations because of unpaid taxes, but resumed all flights on April 6, except for its Madrid route. AeroSur had used a 747 leased from Virgin Atlantic on that route but had returned it to the lessor. The airline planned to resume that route with an ex-Aerolíneas Argentinas 747-400. Ultimately, AeroSur struggled to keep its operations running smoothly and returned its 767 aircraft to the lessor.

On May 17, 2012 AeroSur suspended all its flights again, and other airlines such as state-owned Boliviana de Aviación began to fill the void left by AeroSur. The airline was in talks with potential US investor William Petty who signed a memorandum of understanding to invest up to US$15 million in the Bolivian carrier. AeroSur's air operator's certificate was revoked on July 20, 2012. A group of former employees, as well as William Petty, planned to create a new airline called TU Aerolínea, but as of 2018 nothing had resulted from that venture.

== Subsidiaries ==
=== AeroSur Paraguay ===
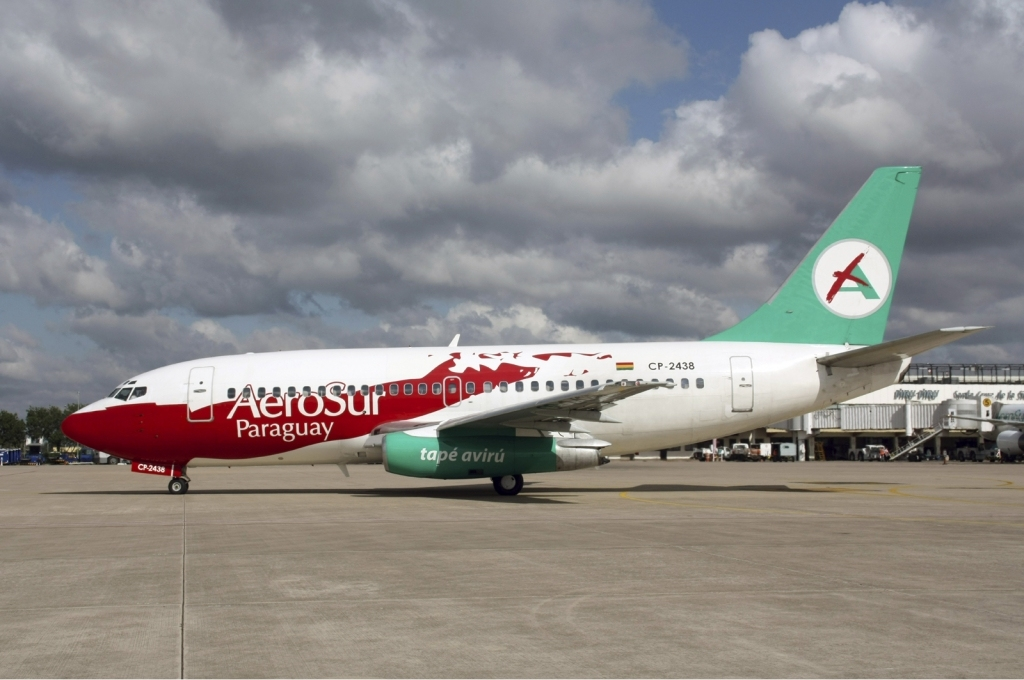
AeroSur Paraguay's Boeing 737-200 in 2010

AeroSur Paraguay was a brand of its parent company, which was trying to become a future airline based at the Silvio Pettirossi International Airport in Asunción, Paraguay, and was to be a subsidiary of the Bolivian airline. Unfortunately, the brand could never be consolidated as one legitimate and legally operational airline; it only became the name for one of the Bolivian airline's aircraft that has already been withdrawn from its fleet due to the financial problems that afflicted one of the most important private airlines in Bolivia in recent years.

=== AeroSur Cargo ===
AeroSur had freight transport service nationwide and international with direct shipments. AeroSur did not operate any dedicated cargo aircraft, but used the cargo holds of its passenger aircraft for network-wide freight transport.

== Destinations ==
Prior to its shutdown, AeroSur operated a comprehensive network of domestic flights to major cities in Bolivia as well as international destinations in South America and long-haul flights to Miami and Madrid. The airline operated a main hub at Viru Viru International Airport in Santa Cruz de la Sierra.

== Fleet ==
=== Last fleet ===
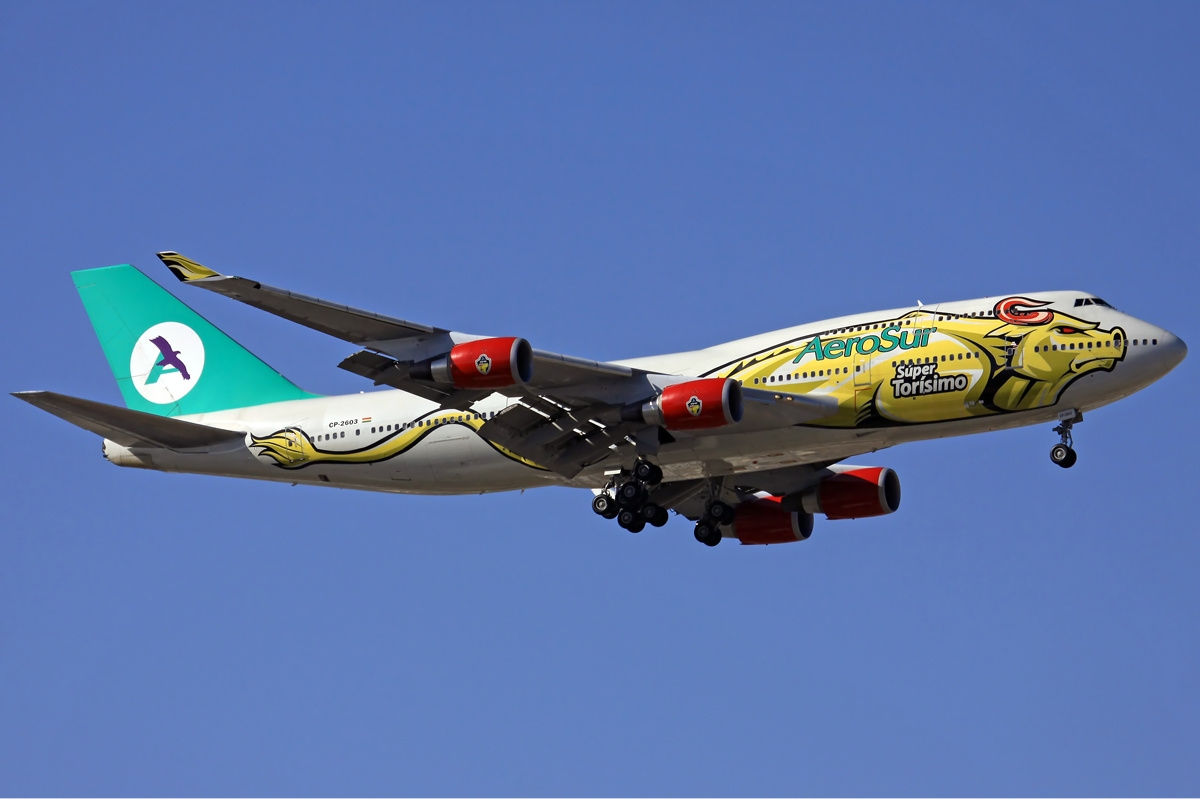
An AeroSur Boeing 747-400 leased from Virgin Atlantic at Adolfo Suárez Madrid–Barajas Airport in 2011

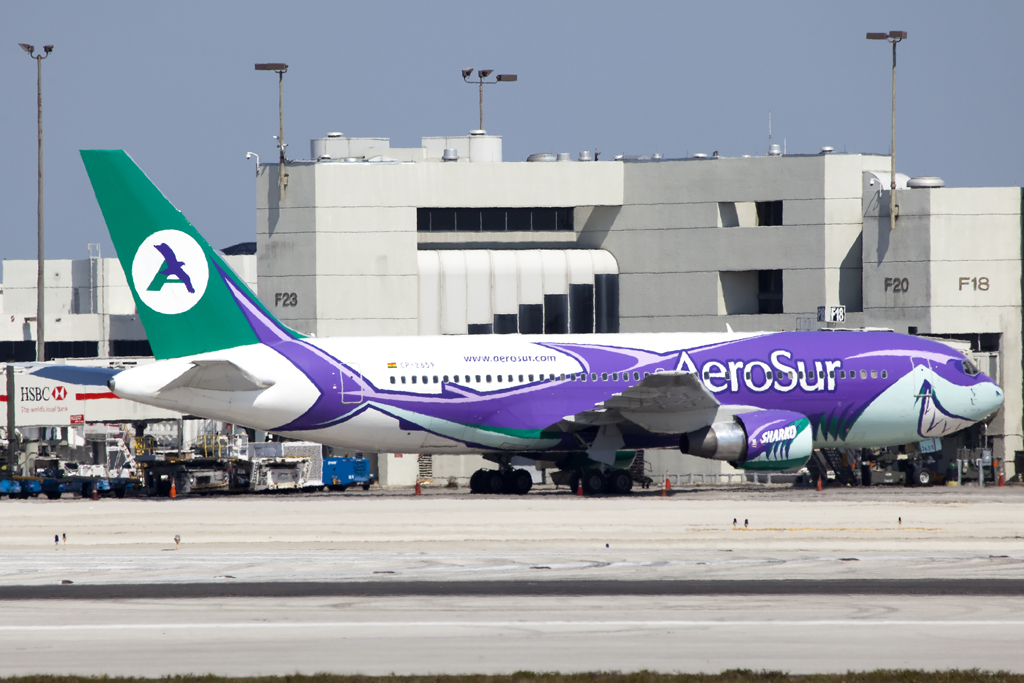
An AeroSur Boeing 767-200ER at Miami International Airport in 2011

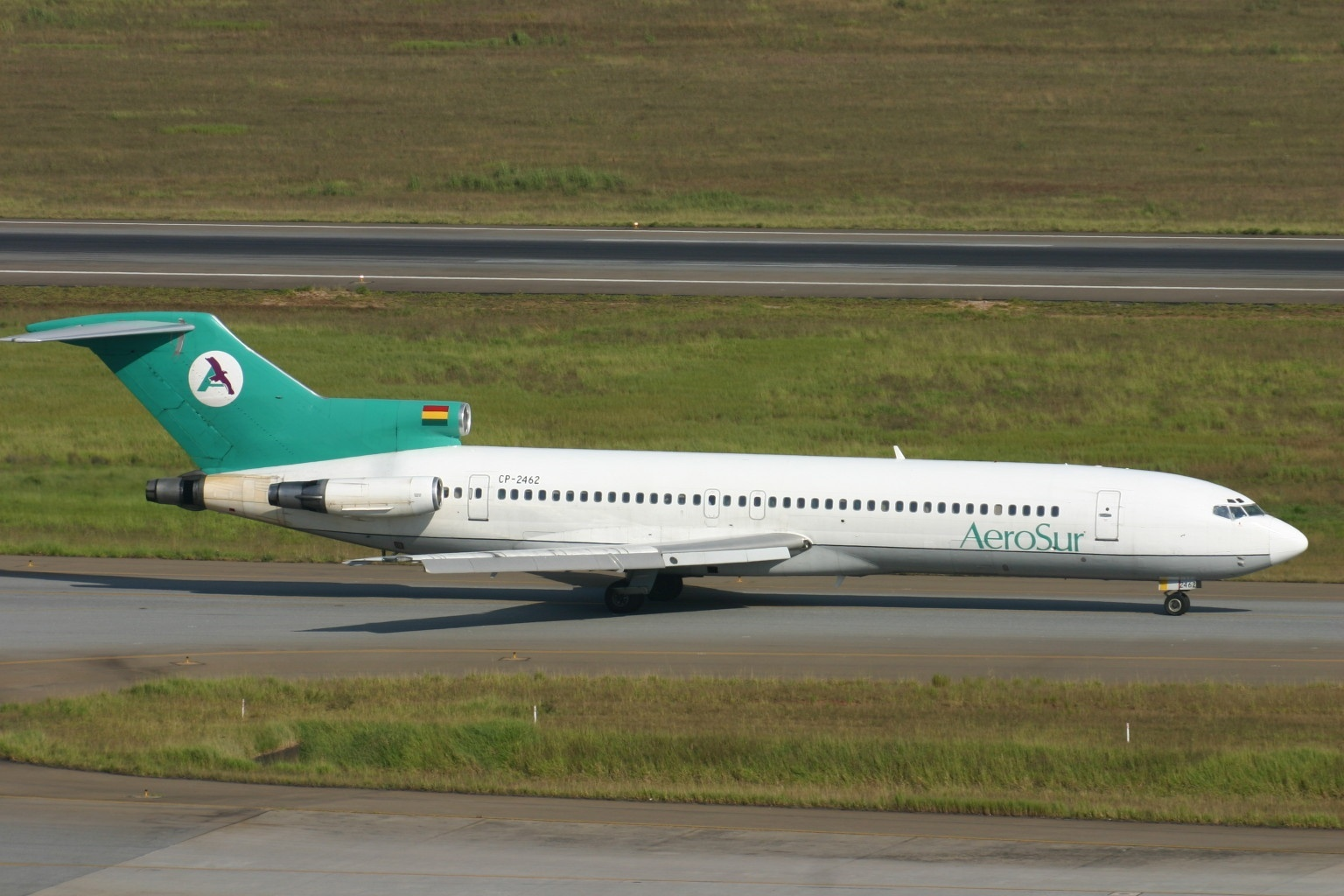
An AeroSur Boeing 727-200 taxiing at São Paulo/Guarulhos International Airport in 2012

As of November 2011, the AeroSur fleet consisted of the following aircraft:

AeroSur fleet
Aircraft	In service	Passengers				Routes	Notes
Aircraft	In service	F	B	E	Total	Routes	Notes
Boeing 727-200	1	0	12	138	150	Domestic	
Boeing 737-300	4	0	12	114	126	Domestic, American	
Boeing 747-400	1	14	58	379	451	Madrid	leased from Virgin Atlantic
Total	6						

=== Fleet development ===
Over the years, AeroSur operated the following aircraft types:

Aircraft	Total	Introduced	Retired	Notes
Aero Commander 500	1	Unknown	1998	
Airbus A330-200	1	2006	2008	Operated by Air Comet
British Aerospace 146-100	2	1992	1996	
British Aerospace 146-200	2	1993	1995	
Beechcraft Baron	1	1992	1993	
Boeing 727-100	7	1995	2005	
Boeing 727-200	13	2001	2012	
Boeing 737-200	5	2003	2012	
Boeing 737-300	5	2009	2012	
Boeing 737-400	1	2010	2012	
Boeing 747-100SR	1	2006	2007	Leased from Logistic Air
Boeing 747-300	1	2008	2010	Leased from Air Atlanta Icelandic
Boeing 747-400	1	2009	2012	Leased from Virgin Atlantic
Boeing 757-200	4	2006	2010	Leased from Ryan International Airlines
Boeing 767-200ER	2	2008	2012	
Dornier 228	1	2003	2004	Leased from Aerocon
Douglas C-117	1	2004	2008	Leased from Líneas Aéreas Canedo
Fairchild Swearingen Metroliner	9	1992	1998	
Let L-410	4	1992	1997	
Piper PA-31 Navajo	1	1993	Unknown	
Piper PA-34 Seneca	1	1993	Unknown	
Yakovlev Yak-40	3	1995	2003	

The 747 aircraft were often given a bull-themed livery, for which those aircraft were sometimes dubbed "Torisimo" or "Super Torisimo."

== Accidents and incidents ==
- On 31 December 1997, an AeroSur Fairchild Swearingen Metroliner (registered CP-2321) was substantially damaged when it veered off the runway at Teniente Jorge Henrich Arauz Airport. The two pilots had lost control of the aircraft during takeoff run. There were no notable injuries among the 18 passengers on board.

== Awards and recognitions ==
- 2008: Named Most Powerful Brand among Bolivian airlines by PricewaterhouseCoopers.
- 2009: Awarded one Bizz Award as Inspiring Company.

== Contributions ==
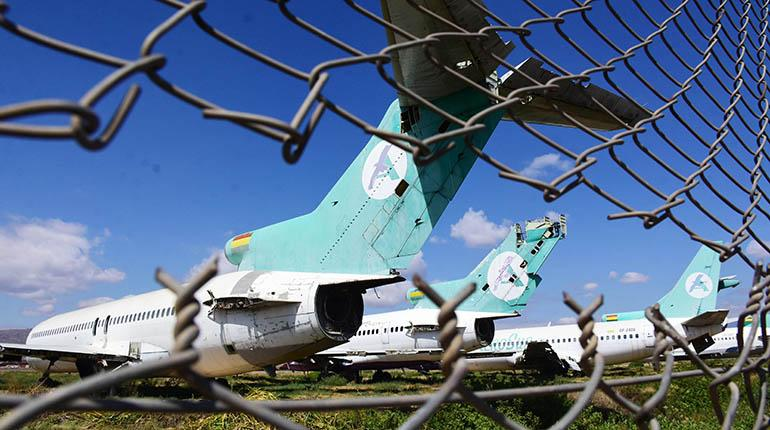
The remaining AeroSur planes today

AeroSur greatly supported sports, especially football, where it created the Copa Aerosur and la Copa AeroSur del Sur, and in mid-2009 the AeroSur Futsal Cup was organized for the first time, featuring CRE and AeroSur from Bolivia, River Plate of Argentina and President Hayes of Paraguay. Aerosur, the host team, won.

A preserved Lockheed L-1049 Super Constellation nicknamed Avion Pirata was painted with the AeroSur livery, although it never entered in service with the airline.

Many street signs in Cochabamba, such as the signs for C. Mexico street, were financed by AeroSur and to this day still bear the airline's name.
