= Estadio Víctor Agustín Ugarte =

Stadium in Bolivia

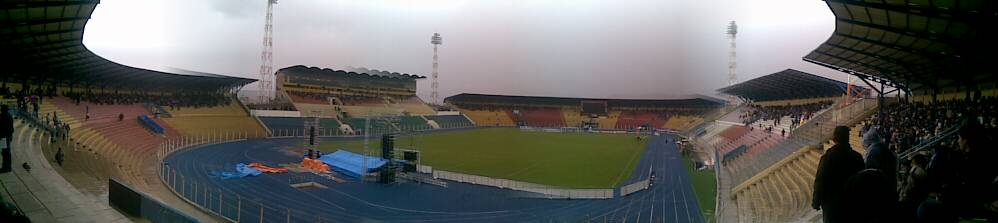
- Panoramic view of the stadium in 2012
- Interactive map of Estadio Víctor Agustín Ugarte
- Former names: Estadio Mario Mercado Vaca Guzmán; Estadio San Clemente
- Location: Potosí, Bolivia
- Coordinates: 19°34′43″S 65°45′40″W
- Elevation: 3,890 m (12,763 ft)
- Capacity: 29,210

Construction
- Opened: 1992
- Renovated: 2008
- Cost: 29,000,000

Tenants
- Real Potosí; Nacional Potosí

Estadio Víctor Agustín Ugarte, also known by its old name Estadio Mario Mercado Vaca Guzmán, is a multi-purpose stadium in Potosí, Bolivia. It is currently used mostly for football matches, on club level by Real Potosí and Nacional Potosí. The stadium has a capacity of 29,210.

== History ==
The stadium was originally called Estadio San Clemente from 1992 to 2000 but was renamed Mario Mercado Vaca Guzmán after some modifications on the structure, including new illumination towers, were made. In 1997, the stadium underwent its first expansion, completing the remaining 2 sections, general and north curve, raising its capacity to 13,000 spectators. In 2007 the club qualified for the Copa Libertadores and the Copa Sudamericana. In order to accommodate the spectators expected for these cups, the stadium underwent another expansion and remodeling in 2008. The capacity was increased to 32,000 spectators, doubling the size of the south bend, north bend and preferred sections, and almost tripling the general capacity. There was also an implementation of a roof around the whole stadium, and the name of the stadium was changed to Estadio Víctor Agustín Ugarte, in tribute to the former Bolivian footballer.

Located at about 3,890 meters above sea level, the stadium is one of the highest in the world. It has raised numerous controversies in footballing clubs, as its significant altitude affects the absorption of oxygen in the human body.
