= René Ortubé =

Bolivian football referee

René Marcelo Ortubé Betancourt
- Full name: René Marcelo Ortubé Betancourt
- Born: 26 December 1964 (age 61); La Paz, Bolivia
- Other occupation: Director of sports institutes and services

Domestic
| Years | League | Role |

International
| Years | League | Role |
| 2002 | FIFA listed | Referee |

René Marcelo Ortubé Betancourt (born December 26, 1964, in La Paz) is a Bolivian former football referee, best known for supervising one match (Sweden-Nigeria in Kobe) during the 2002 FIFA World Cup. He is now director of sports institutes and services in Bolivian capital La Paz.
