= Universitario de Sucre =

Bolivian football club

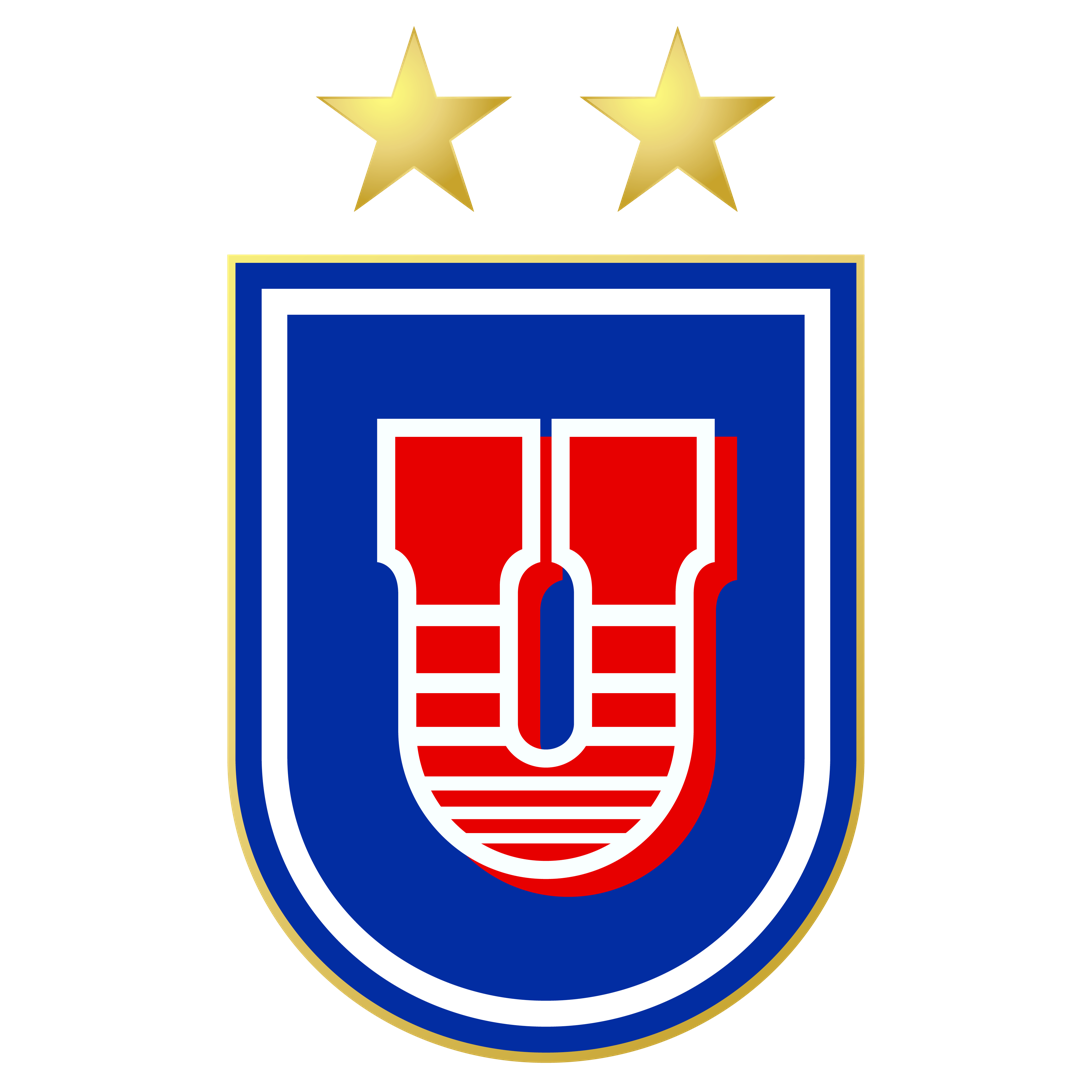
- Full name: Club Deportivo Universitario San Francisco Xavier
- Nicknames: Los Doctos (The Doctos); La U de Sucre (U from Sucre); El equipo Estudiantil (Student team)
- Founded: 5 April 1962; 64 years ago (as Medicina)
- Ground: Estadio Olímpico Patria
- Capacity: 32,000
- Owner: University of Saint Francis Xavier
- Chairman: Peter Campos
- Manager: Javier Vega
- League: Copa Simón Bolívar; Primera A ACHF
- 2023: Primera A ACHF, 3rd of 12
Home colours	Away colours	Third colours

Club Deportivo Universitario San Francisco Xavier is a professional football team based in Sucre, Bolivia, that competes in the Bolivian second division and in the Chuquisaca regional league.

The club has two titles in its history and also has three international appearances in continental tournaments of South America, one in the Copa Libertadores and two in the Copa Sudamericana, the most notable in the 2010 season of that tournament, finishing in the Round of 16.

Universitario's home matches are played at Estadio Olímpico Patria since 1992, the complex count with 32,000 spectators. The also club is owned by the Sucre's public academy, University of Saint Francis Xavier of Chuquisaca.

== History ==
=== Foundation and amateur era ===
Universitario was founded on 5 April 1961 under the initiative of teacher Alfredo Sandi under the name Medicina. In the first seasons of the team, the club has the support of the "Father of the University sport" and the moral and material support of the lawyer Óscar Salas, in this moment rector of the Saint Francis Xavier University.

A memorable day for the club was when the team play his first match in its history against Ciencias Económicas at Cancha del Seminario (today Complejo Deportivo Universitario). In the half-time of the game, Sandi was to congratulate to the players and also proposed to the team to represent to the university in the championship of the Asociación de Fútbol de Sucre (AFS). The proposal was accepted by the players and the young students are committed to participate in this tournament.

In the committee of the AFS, the club was enrolled in the association under the name of Club Universitario for play in the Copa Simón Bolívar, the second tier of Bolivia. The first uniform of the club was a white kit with a blue strip, blue shorts and white socks. Subsequent, was formalized the red kit with a letter U in the chest and blue shorts.

=== Seasons in Primera División ===
In 2005, Universitario achieved 49 points in the regional league of Sucre, qualifying for Group B of the Copa Simón Bolívar, finally the club ended in first place in the group with 13 points, now qualifying for the play-offs. Sucre reached the final, defeating Guabirá in the game for an aggregate result of 8–1, after winning the tournament, the club was promoted to the first tier and qualified for the 2006 Copa Sudamericana.

In the first season of Universitario in the first division, the club finished in the third place of the regular fase with 42 points, qualifying for the final hexagonal. In the hexagonal, the club ended in the fourth position. In the Copa Sudamericana, Sucre won for an aggregate result of 3–2 to Bolívar in the club's debut for the tournament, however Universitario was eliminated by El Nacional of Ecuador in the next round. In the next season, Universitario was nearly relegated after of finish in the 11th place (the penultimate place) with 25 points, one point over the relegated team Real Mamoré.

In 2008, the club achieved his first title in Primera División during the Torneo Apertura, finishing in the first position with 43 points, also advancing to Group 5 of the Copa Libertadores 2010. In his debut for the Libertadores, Universitario tied 1–1 with Deportivo Quito at Sucre. However Sucre, only finished with two points in the group, this two points were obtained in Bolivia for the advantage of the altitude. Whilst in the league the club finished in the fifth position with 33 points in the Apertura and in the Clausura in the second place of the Group B with 18 points.

In the season 2010, because of be the winner of Apertura Loser's Hexagonal, the club qualified for the Copa Sudamericana 2010. Universitario debuted in the tournament with a home victory 2–0 in the first round, against the Chilean champion of the Libertadores 1991, Colo-Colo, with the goals of Roberto Galindo and Sacha Lima. After of the same game, the left back of the Chilean club, Roberto Cereceda was involved in a doping controversy, with a risk a two-year ban for part of the CONMEBOL. In the rematch, "the doctos" were nearly eliminated of the tournament, after of loss 3–1 at Santiago. In the next round, Sucre won 1–0 over Cerro Porteño with a goal of Galindo at Estadio Olímpico Patria, however in Paraguay once Galindo saved to the "doctos" after score two goals in a 2–2 draw at the Estadio Defensores del Chaco. Now in the round of 16 of the tournament, Universitario played with a hard rival, the Brazilian side Palmeiras, being finally eliminated by the Brazilians for an aggregate result of 4–1. In the Clausura, Sucre ended in the 12th place (last position) with 22 points.

== Rivalries ==
=== South Bolivia derby ===
Universitario's biggest rival is Real Potosí from Potosí, despite both cities not having a regular 1st division team, they enjoy a heated derby between their teams and usually the matches have crowds up to 20,000 spectators.

The current South Bolivia derby started in 2006, with both teams being dominant when playing home as an away win on official tournaments is yet to be seen.

== Honours ==
=== National ===
- Bolivian Primera División
  - Winners (2): 2008-A, 2014-C
- Bolivian Second Division
  - Winners (1): 2005

=== Regional ===
- Primera "A" (ACHF)
  - Winners (10): 1990, 1991, 1992, 1993, 1994, 1995, 1996, 2004, 2005, 2021

== Players ==
=== Current squad ===
Note: Flags indicate national team as defined under FIFA eligibility rules; some limited exceptions apply. Players may hold more than one non-FIFA nationality.

No.	Pos.	Nation	Player
1	GK	ARG	Ivan Brun (captain)
2	DF	BOL	Carlos Balsera
3	DF	BOL	Jorge Cuellar
5	MF	BOL	Leandro Maygua
7	DF	BOL	Ricardo Verduguez
8	MF	BOL	Rodrigo Borda
9	FW	ARG	Federico Miño
10	MF	ESP	Bruno Pascua
11	MF	BOL	Dustin Maldonado
12	DF	COL	Juan Camilo Rios
13	MF	BOL	Adriel Fernandez
14	FW	ARG	Marcelo Argüello

No.	Pos.	Nation	Player
15	MF	BOL	Marcos Andia
16	DF	PAR	José Carlos Baez
17	MF	BOL	Iván Vidaurre
18	FW	BOL	Nahuel Vaca
19	FW	BOL	Carlos Vargas
20	DF	BOL	Jorge Ayala
21	DF	BOL	Óscar Baldomar
22	GK	BOL	Éder Jordán
23	MF	BOL	Edwin Rivera
25	FW	BOL	Oscar Díaz
31	GK	BOL	Manuel Valda

== Administration ==
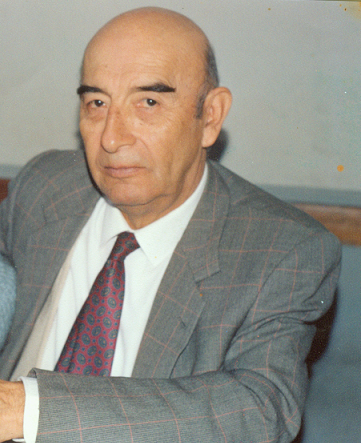
Carlos Tellez, one of the founders and first club's vicepresident

The club's institution is owned by Sucre's public university, the University of Saint Francis Xavier of Chuquisaca. The first board of Universitario was elected by the sport secretaries of each student center and the first club's directive was composed by students of his university.

=== First board ===
Position	Board	Occupation
President	(Bolivia) Enrique Loayza	Professor on law's faculty
Vice president	(Bolivia) Carlos Tellez	Professor on dentistry's faculty
General secretary	(Bolivia) Enrique Cuellar	Professor on law's faculty
Delegate to Sucre Football Association	(Bolivia) Luis Ríos	Medicine student

=== Presidents ===
President	Years
(Bolivia) Enrique Loayza	1961–68
(Bolivia) Carlos Tellez	1969–76
(Bolivia) Jhonny de la Riva	1976–78
(Bolivia) Miguel Hayes	1978–87
(Bolivia) Julio Castro	1961–69
(Bolivia) Aquilino Parra	1989–93
(Bolivia) Julio Heredia	1994–97
(Bolivia) Gonzalo Pórcel	1998–03
(Bolivia) Wálter Arízaga	2004–05
(Bolivia) Jaime Barrón	2006–09
(Bolivia) Wálter Arízaga	2009–14
(Bolivia) Cristian Copa	2014–

== Managers ==
- (Bolivia) Eduardo Villegas (Feb 26, 2011 – March 23, 2012)
- (Bolivia) Sergio Apaza (Feb 29, 2012 – Sept 12)
- (Mexico) David de la Torre (Sept 2012 – Nov 12)
- (Bolivia) Javier Vega (Dec 2012 – Dec 14)
- (Bolivia) Julio César Baldivieso (Dec 2014 – May 15)
- (Bolivia) Javier Vega (June 2015 – Jan 17)
- (Argentina) Daniel Cordoba (Jan 2017 – June 17)
- (Argentina) Edgardo Malvestiti (June 2017–)
