= Estadio Gran Mamoré =

Multi-use stadium in Trinidad, Bolivia

- Interactive map of Estadio Gran Mamoré
- Full name: Estadio Gran Mamoré
- Location: Trinidad, Bolivia
- Coordinates: 14°49′12″S 64°53′37″W
- Owner: Beni Department Government
- Capacity: 12,000 (Football)
- Surface: Grass

Tenants
- Libertad Gran Mamoré; Universitario del Beni

The Estadio Gran Mamoré is a multi-use stadium in Trinidad, Bolivia. It is currently used mostly for football matches and is the home stadium of Libertad Gran Mamoré and Universitario del Beni. The stadium holds 12,000 people.
