= Unión Tarija =

Bolivian football club

- Full name: Club Unión Tarija
- Founded: April 8, 1980
- Ground: Estadio IV Centenário; Tarija, Bolivia
- Capacity: 15,000
- League: Primera B
- 2006: 12th
Home colours	Away colours

Unión Tarija is a Bolivian football team playing at Tarija Primera A, the 2nd division regional league. It is based in Tarija. Their home stadium is Estadio IV Centenário. The team played in the Liga de Fútbol Profesional Boliviano between 1999 and 2006.

== History ==
The club was founded on April 8, 1980, as the Club Unión Central.

== National honours ==
- First Division – Professional Era: 0
- Copa Simón Bolivar: 1

1998
