= Municipal Real Mamoré =

Bolivian football club

Real Mamoré
- Full name: Municipal Real Mamoré
- Nickname: Turbión Beniano
- Founded: 2006; 20 years ago
- Dissolved: 2012
- Ground: Estadio Gran Mamoré; Trinidad, Bolivia
- Capacity: 12,000
- Chairman: Sebastian Paz
- Manager: Sergio Apaza
- League: Liga de Fútbol Profesional Boliviano
- Adecuación 2011: 11th
Home colours	Away colours

Municipal Real Mamoré is a Bolivian football club from Trinidad, founded in 2006 after the merge of Municipal Trinidad and Real Mamoré, the team won the 2nd division tournament in 2006 and won promotion to 1st division. In early 2007 the team changed its name to Real Mamoré.

== Achievements ==
=== National honours ===
- First Division – Professional Era: 0
- Second Division, Copa Simón Bolivar: 1

2006
