= Club Real Potosí =

Association football club in Bolivia

Real Potosí
- Full name: Club Real Potosí
- Nicknames: León Imperial; El Equipo Lila; El Fenómeno
- Founded: 1 April 1988; 38 years ago
- Ground: Estadio Víctor Agustín Ugarte
- Capacity: 32,500
- President: Freddy Marca Uño
- Manager: Andrés Marinangeli
- League: Copa Simón Bolívar; Primera A AFP
- 2023 2023: Copa Simón Bolívar, 6th of 40; Primera A AFP, 1st of 1
- Website: http://www.clubrealpotosi.com/
Home colours	Away colours

Club Real Potosí is a Bolivian football club based in Potosí. Founded on 1 April 1988, it plays in the Potosí Football Association Championship, after being relegated from the Bolivian Primera División in 2021, holding home games at Estadio Víctor Agustín Ugarte, with a 32,000-seat capacity.

== History ==
Real Potosí was founded on 1 April 1988, as Fútbol Academy of Real Potosì. They subsequently merged with Banco Minero of Bolivia (Bamin), which was founded on 20 October 1941.

The club played their first continental competition, the Copa Libertadores, in 2002. They were drawn with Peñarol of Uruguay, El Nacional of Ecuador, and San Lorenzo de Almagro of Argentina. Even though they came in last place, they beat San Lorenzo 1-0 and thrashed Peñarol 6-1. The reason for the strange one-sided result was most likely due to the high elevation of the stadium (4,000 metres), since the team had lost the away leg 4-0.

In 2007 Real Potosi became champion of the Apertura tournament, earning qualification for that year's Copa Libertadores. The following year they won the Copa Aerosur del Sur and Torneo Play Off.

Real Potosí gained popularity by being announced as one of the opponents of Flamengo and Paraná Clube in the 2007 Copa Libertadores, by forcing teams to play in the city of Potosí, at 4,090 metres (13,200 feet) above the sea level. They came in third place in the group, recording a 3-1 victory against Parana, and were undefeated at home, despite getting no away wins.

The following year Cruzeiro played against Real Potosí, losing 5-1, despite having won 3-0 in Brazil, and 2009 Palmeiras was the most famous opponent, eliminating Real from the tournament.

== Stadium ==
The Estadio Víctor Agustín Ugarte is a Bolivian football stadium located in Potosí, which seats 32,000 fans.

The stadium was originally called Estadio San Clemente, but was renamed Mario Mercado Vaca Guzmán after some modifications on the structure, including new illumination towers, were made. Newer modifications led ultimately to its actual name.

Located 4,090 metres above sea level, the stadium is one of the highest in the world. It has raised numerous controversies in footballing circles, as its significant altitude affects the absorption of oxygen in the human body, offering considerable advantage to the home team who are more accustomed to such conditions.

== Current squad ==
Note: Flags indicate national team as defined under FIFA eligibility rules; some limited exceptions apply. Players may hold more than one non-FIFA nationality.

No.	Pos.	Nation	Player
1	GK	ARG	Christian Martínez
2	DF	BOL	Juan Rioja
3	DF	ARG	Gonzalo Añasgo
6	MF	BOL	Jairo Thomas
7	FW	BOL	Fabricio Suárez
8	MF	BOL	Imanol Cárdenas
10	MF	BOL	Vladimir Castellón
11	FW	ARG	Maximiliano Gómez
12	MF	BOL	Boris Condori
13	MF	BOL	John Vargas
14	DF	BOL	Emerson Velasquez
15	DF	BOL	Lucas Revuelta
16	DF	BOL	Carlos Chore

No.	Pos.	Nation	Player
17	FW	BOL	Daniel Cuellar
18	FW	COL	Jeferson Rivas
19	MF	BOL	Anderson Brito
20	FW	COL	John Méndez
21	DF	BOL	William Fernández
22	DF	BOL	Fran Supayabe
23	FW	BOL	Luis Alí
26	MF	BOL	Luis Vargas
29	GK	COL	Juan Carvajal
30	MF	BOL	Jose Alipaz
31	MF	BOL	Renan Terrazas
41	MF	BRA	Igor Soares
99	GK	BOL	David Akologo

== Rivalries ==
The club has a rivalry with the only other first division club in the Potosí Department, Nacional Potosí. They share the same stadium, and matches between them usually draw lots of attention.

The first match played between the two clubs was in the 2009 Copa Aerosur on 18 January 2009. Real Potosi won 2-1. The first league match between the two clubs was on 19 April 2009, which finished in a 1-1 draw.

Although both clubs were founded in the 20th century, the reason why it took so long for both clubs to meet was because Nacional Potosi had been playing in the lower divisions until 2009. Nacional Potosí have won 18 times, while Real Potosí have only done it 15 times, there were 11 draws.

== Honours ==
=== National ===
- Bolivian Primera División
  - Winners (1): 2007-A
- Torneo de Play-Off
  - Winners (2): 2008, 2009
- Bolivian Second Division
  - Winners (1): 1997

=== Regional ===
- Primera "A" (AFP)
  - Winners (6): 1990, 1991, 1995, 1996, 1997, 2023

== Performance in CONMEBOL competitions ==
- Copa Libertadores: 6 appearances

2002 – First Round
2007 – First Round
2008 – First Round
2009 – Preliminary Round
2010 – Preliminary Round
2012 – Preliminary Round

- Copa Sudamericana: 4 appearances

2007 – First Round
2013 – First Round
2015 – First Round
2016 – Second Round

== Notable managers ==
- (Bolivia) Félix Berdeja
- (Bolivia) Mauricio Soria (10 April 2007–14 March 08)
- (Bolivia) Vladimir Soria (16 Sept 2009–25 Sept 11)
- (Argentina) Dalcio Giovagnoli (2011)
- (Argentina) Victor Zwenger (28 Nov 2011–10 Feb 12)
- (Bolivia) Julio César Baldivieso (10 Feb 2012–18 May 12)
- (Argentina) Óscar Sanz (3 June 2012 – 2013)
- (Bolivia) Fernando Ochoaizpur (December 2018 – March 2019)
