= La Paz F.C. =

Association football club in Bolivia

La Paz
- Full name: La Paz Fútbol Club
- Nicknames: Los Ingenieros (the Engineers); Los Azulgranas (the Blue-Reds); Los Hombres Cóndor (the Condor Men)
- Founded: 1989
- Dissolved: 2013
- Ground: Estadio Hernando Siles; El Alto, Bolivia
- Capacity: 42,000
- Chairman: Manuel Quispe
- League: La Paz Regional League
- Adecuación 2011: 12th
| Home colours | Away colours |

La Paz Fútbol Club, also known as La Paz F.C., was a professional football (soccer) team from La Paz, that played in the La Paz Regional League. Formerly known as Atlético González, the team gained promotion to the Liga de Fútbol Profesional Boliviano in 2003 and competed in first division until relegation in 2013.

== History ==
La Paz F.C. is the "Cinderella" sensation of Bolivian football. In Actuality it is the third most important professional football/soccer team in the city of La Paz, Bolivia behind The Strongest and Club Bolívar, both of which have much longer histories, more numerous followings, and larger payrolls than La Paz F.C.

The team's motto is 'Plus Altus', meaning "something higher" a reference both to the team's aspirations as well as to the team's high altitude home. (The City of La Paz is located at an elevation of 3,600 meters above sea level and is the highest capital in the world.) The team colors are blue, red and white. Blue symbolizes the perennial cobalt skies over the City of La Paz and the loyalty of its fans; red symbolizes the passion and love of football; and white symbolizes the snow cap of Mt. Illimani (the symbol of the City of La Paz) and the purity of Our Lady of Peace, patroness of the team. The uniform design is similar to that of Barcelona F.C. (Spain). La Paz F.C. plays its home matches at Estadio Hernando Siles.

The founder, owner and president of La Paz F.C. is Mauricio González . The original name of the team is in honor of Mr. González's late father Ing. Walter González (see external link below to "Premio Academico Ing. Walter González"), a past president of the Bolivian Society of Engineers. Mauricio González has had a lifelong involvement and is a charismatic promoter of Bolivian football/soccer, including youth and women's programs. Moreover, he is an articulate advocate for the proposition that Bolivia has the right—based on history, medical science, and fairness—to play international matches in its high altitude cities of La Paz, Potosi and Oruro. He is a leading member of an ad hoc committee of prominent Bolivians formed to design a strategy to campaign against the FIFA altitude ban.

== Manager ==
The current manager ("Director Técnico") of La Paz F.C. is Felix Berdeja. He was also the first manager of the team, having returned "home" to La Paz F.C. at the beginning of the 2009 Apertura season.

== Players ==
La Paz F.C. fields mostly Bolivian players; however, it has also benefited from the services of Argentine, Brazilian, Colombian, Peruvian, and American players. In addition, several La Paz F.C. players have played in Europe and China. The team captain for the past several years has been Romulo Alaca, a veteran who has been with the team since its days in the lower divisions. La Paz F.C. players that have been "capped" for the Bolivia national team include Ronald Gutierrez, Augusto Andaveris, Helmuth Gutierrez, and Didí Torrico.

== Honours ==
=== National ===
- Bolivian Second Division
  - Winners (1): 2003

=== Regional ===
- Campeonato Paceño
  - Winners (5): 1996, 1997, 2000, 2002, 2003

== Performance in CONMEBOL competitions ==
- Copa Libertadores: 1 appearance

Best: Preliminary Round in 2008 (lost to (Mexico) FC Atlas, 2–1)
2008 – Preliminary Round

- Copa Sudamericana: 1 appearance

Best: First Stage in 2009
2009 – First Stage

- Recopa Sudamericana: 0 appearances

:
