= 2010 Club Bolívar season =

Bolivar
2010 season
- Chairman: Guido Loayza & Marcelo Claure
- Manager: Nestor Clausen
- 2010 Apertura: 5th
- Torneo Invierno: -
- Copa Aerosur: Winners
- Copa Libertadores: Group Stage
- Clausura: -
- Top goalscorer: William Ferreira (11 goals)

The 2010 season is Bolivar's 33rd consecutive season in the Liga de Fútbol Profesional Boliviano, and 85th year in existence as a football club.

The club won the Copa Aerosur, becoming the first team to win two in a row.

== Squad ==
For Liga de Fútbol Profesional Boliviano 2010 Note: Flags indicate national team as defined under FIFA eligibility rules; some limited exceptions apply. Players may hold more than one non-FIFA nationality.

No.	Pos.	Nation	Player
1	GK	BOL	Carlos Erwin Arias (captain)
2	DF	BOL	Ariel Juárez
3	DF	URU	Ignacio Ithurralde
4	DF	BOL	Ronald Rivero
5	DF	BOL	Abdón Reyes
6	MF	BOL	Rudy Cardozo
7	MF	BOL	Leonel Reyes
8	MF	BRA	Charles Da Silva
9	MF	BOL	Wálter Flores
10	FW	BRA	Anderson Gonzaga
11	FW	URU	William Ferreira

No.	Pos.	Nation	Player
12	GK	BOL	Marcelo Robledo
13	DF	BOL	Enrique Parada
14	DF	BOL	Luis A. Torrico
15	DF	BOL	Limbert Méndez
16	DF	BOL	Henry Bazan
17	MF	BOL	Mario Ovando
18	MF	BOL	Álex da Rosa
19	MF	BOL	Gabriel Valverde
20	MF	BOL	Didí Torrico
21	FW	BOL	Jorge Cespedes
22	FW	BOL	Gabriel Ríos

=== Top scorers ===
Includes all competitive matches. The list is sorted by shirt number when total goals are equal.

Last updated on 7 July

Position	Nation	Number	Name	Apertura	Torneo Invierno	Clausura	Copa Libertadores	Copa Aerosur	Total
1	(Uruguay)	11	William Ferreira	11	8	0	1	5	25
2	(Bolivia)	18	Alex da Rosa	4	2	0	1	0	7
3	(Brazil)	8	Charles da Silva	5	0	0	0	1	6
4	(Brazil)	10	Anderson Gonzaga	4	0	0	0	0	4
5	(Bolivia)	6	Rudy Cardozo	2	0	0	0	0	2
5	(Bolivia)	13	Luis Torrico	2	0	0	0	0	2
6	(Bolivia)	19	Juan Gabriel Valverde	1	0	0	0	0	1
6	(Bolivia)	4	Ronald Riveros	1	0	0	0	0	1
6	(Bolivia)	7	Leonel Reyes	1	0	0	0	0	1
6	(Bolivia)	9	Walter Flores	0	0	0	1	0	1
6	(Bolivia)	13	Enrique Parada	1	0	0	0	1	1
6	(Uruguay)	3	Ignacio Ithurralde	0	0	0	0	1	1
			TOTALS	32	10	0	3	8	53

== Copa Aerosur ==
=== Play-off Round ===
Team 1	Agg.	Team 2	1st leg	2nd leg
Bolívar	3–2	The Strongest	2–1	1–1
Blooming	4–2	Oriente Petrolero	3–1	1–1
Jorge Wilstermann	4–1	Aurora	1–0	3–1

First Leg

January 18
15:30

Bolívar	2–1	The Strongest
William Ferreira 20'; Charles da Silva 74'	(Report)	Herman Soliz 49'

Estadio Hernando Siles, La Paz
Attendance: 40,000
Referee: René Ortubé

Second Leg

January 18
15:30

The Strongest	1–1	Bolívar
Darwin Peña 8'	(Report)	William Ferreira 5'

Estadio Hernando Siles, La Paz
Attendance: 39,000
Referee: Oscar Maldonado

=== Semi-final ===
Team 1	Agg.	Team 2	1st leg	2nd leg
Bolívar	2–1	Blooming	2–1	0–0
Jorge Wilstermann	2–1	The Strongest	1–1	1–0

1st Leg

January 18
15:30

Bolívar	2–1	Blooming
William Ferreira 34', 45'	(Report)	Luís Sillero 71'

Estadio Hernando Siles, La Paz
Attendance: 38,000

2nd Leg

February 1
19:00

Blooming	0 – 0	Bolívar
	(Report)

Estadio Ramón Tahuichi Aguilera, Santa Cruz de la Sierra
Attendance: 31,000

=== Final ===
Team 1	Agg.	Team 2	1st leg	2nd leg
Bolívar	2–1	Jorge Wilstermann	1–1	0–0

February 3
15:30

Bolívar	1–1	Jorge Wilstermann
Ignacio Ithurralde 90'	(Report)	Nicolás Raimondi 68'

Estadio Hernando Siles, La Paz
Attendance: 36,000

February 1
15:30

Jorge Wilstermann	1–1	Bolívar
Nicolás Raimondi 24'	(Report)	William Ferreira 75'
Penalties
(penalty scored) Sanjurjo; (penalty scored) Raimondi; (penalty missed) Castedo; (penalty scored) Barrera; (penalty missed) Salaberry	3 – 4	Ferreira (penalty scored); Ithurralde (penalty scored); Rivero (penalty scored); Arias (penalty scored) da Rosa (penalty missed)

Félix Capriles, Cochabamba
Attendance: 30,000

== Copa Libertadores ==
Pos	Team	Pld	W	D	L	GF	GA	GD	Pts	ELP	ALI	JA	BOL
1	(Argentina) Estudiantes	6	4	1	1	11	5	+6	13	—	1–0	5–1	2–0
2	(Peru) Alianza Lima	6	4	0	2	12	7	+5	12	4–1	—	2–0	1–0
3	(Peru) Juan Aurich	6	2	0	4	7	13	−6	6	0–2	4–2	—	2–0
4	(Bolivia) Bolívar	6	1	1	4	3	8	−5	4	0–0	1–3	2–0	—

Legend: Blue = home team win; Yellow = draw; Red = away team win.

Matches

February 10, 2010
17:30 (UTC-4)

Bolívar (Bolivia)	1 – 3	(Peru) Alianza Lima
Ferreira 89' (pen.)	Report	Fernández 73', 74'; Montaño 90+1'

Estadio Hernando Siles, La Paz
Attendance: 25,000
Referee: Samuel Haro (Ecuador)
February 24, 2010
17:30 (UTC-5)

Juan Aurich (Peru)	2 – 0	(Bolivia) Bolívar
Ciciliano 11'; Tejada 37'	Report

Estadio Elías Aguirre, Chiclayo
Attendance: 15,000
Referee: Patricio Polic (Chile)
March 9, 2010
18:00 (UTC-4)

Bolívar (Bolivia)	0 – 0	(Argentina) Estudiantes
	Report

Estadio Hernando Siles, La Paz
Attendance: 9,000
Referee: Carlos Galeano (Paraguay)
March 23, 2010
19:30 (UTC-3)

Estudiantes (Argentina)	2 – 0	(Bolivia) Bolívar
Sosa 51'; Boselli 79'	Report

Estadio José Luis Meiszner, Quilmes
Attendance: 28,000
Referee: Marcelo de Lima Henrique (Brazil)
April 20, 2010
20:15 (UTC-4)

Bolívar (Bolivia)	2 – 0	(Peru) Juan Aurich
Flores 71' da Rosa 86'	Report

Estadio Hernando Siles, La Paz
Attendance: 10,000
Referee: Jorge Osorio (Chile)

== Torneo Apertura ==
=== Serie B ===
Standings

Pos	Team	Pld	W	D	L	GF	GA	GD	Pts	Qualification
1	Bolívar	12	9	1	2	23	11	+12	28	Advanced to the Winner's Hexagonal
2	Oriente Petrolero	12	7	1	4	21	10	+11	22	Advanced to the Winner's Hexagonal
3	Jorge Wilstermann	12	5	3	4	17	17	0	18	Advanced to the Winner's Hexagonal
4	Real Potosí	12	5	1	6	11	19	−8	16	Advanced to the Loser's Hexagonal
5	La Paz	12	4	2	6	19	19	0	14	Advanced to the Loser's Hexagonal
6	Real Mamoré	12	4	0	8	15	25	−10	12	Advanced to the Loser's Hexagonal

Updated to match(es) played on May 6, 2010. Source: RSSSF
Rules for classification: 1) points; 2) goal difference; 3) number of goals scored.

==== Results by round ====
Round	1	2	3	4	5	6	7	8	9	10	11	12
Ground	A	H	A	A	A	A	H	A	A	H	A	A
Result	W	W	W	W	D	W	L	W	W	W	L	W
Position	2	1	1	1	1	1	1	1	1	1	1	1

Updated to match(es) played on 13 April. Source: Matches
A = Away; H = Home; W = Win; D = Draw; L = Loss

==== Matches ====
7 March 2010
15:30

Jorge Wilstermann	0 –1	Bolivar
	(Report)	Charles Da Silva 33'

Estadio Felix Capriles, Cochabamba
Attendance: 13,000
Referee: Jorge Joaquín Antequera

14 March 2010
13:00

Bolivar	6– 1	Real Mamore
Charles Da Silva 27'; Ovidio Guatía 36'; Álex da Rosa 45'; William Ferreira 51', 61', 68'	(Report)	Juan Pablo Fernández 26'

Estadio Hernando Siles, La Paz
Attendance: 10,000
Referee: Henry Montaño

18 March 2010
15:30

Real Potosi	1 – 3	Bolivar
Augusto Andaveris 30'	(Report)	William Ferreira 60'; Leonel Reyes 73'; Charles Da Silva 83'

Estadio Victor Agustín Ugarte, Potosí
Attendance: 20,000
Referee: Oscar Saucedo

21 March 2010
15:30

Bolivar	1 – 0	Oriente Petrolero
William Ferreira 86'	(Report)

Estadio Hernando Siles, La Paz
Attendance: 22,000
Referee: Ivan Gamboa

29 March 2010
18:45

The Strongest	2 – 2	Bolivar
Limberg Gutierrez 25'; Thiago Leitao 27'	(Report)	William Ferreira 53'; Charles Da Silva 85'

Estadio Hernando Siles, La Paz
Attendance: 41,000
Referee: Jorge Joaquín Antequera

1 April 2010
16:00

La Paz F.C.	0 – 1	Bolivar
	(Report)	William Ferreira 58'

Estadio Hernando Siles, La Paz
Attendance: 15,000
Referee: Oscar Maldonado

12 April 2010
15:45

Bolivar	1 – 2	Jorge Wilstermann
William Ferreira 58'	(Report)	Fernando Sanjurjo 43'; Henry Machado 76'

Estadio Hernando Siles, La Paz
Attendance: 28,000
Referee: Julio Nelio

18 April 2010
16:00

Real Mamore	1 – 3	Bolivar
Porfirio Diez 75'	(Report)	Anderson Gonzaga 6', 21'; Alex da Rosa 76'

Estadio Gran Mamoré, Trinidad
Attendance: 14,000
Referee: Gery Vargas

26 April 2010
17:45

Bolivar	1 – 2	The Strongest
Ronald Rivero 76'	(Report)

Estadio Hernando Siles, La Paz
Attendance: 40,000
Referee: Raul Orrozco

29 April 2010
18:00

Bolivar	2 – 1	Real Potosi
Alex da Rosa 29'; Juan Gabriel Valverde 43'	(Report)	Helmut Gutíerrez 58'

Estadio Hernando Siles, La Paz
Attendance: 20,000
Referee: Marco Villa

3 May 2010
20:00

Oriente Petrolero	3 – 1	Bolivar
Jorge Ramírez 35', 67', 84'	(Report)	Anderson Gonzaga 22'

Estadio Tahuichi Aguilera, Santa Cruz de la Sierra
Attendance: 30,000
Referee: Hostin Prado

6 May 2010
18:45

Bolivar	1 – 0	La Paz F.C.
Luis Torrico 39'	(Report)

Estadio Hernando Siles, La Paz
Attendance: 23,000
Referee: Ivan Gamboa

=== Winner's Hexagonal ===
Standings

Pos	Team	Pld	W	D	L	GF	GA	GD	Pts	Qualification
1	Jorge Wilstermann	10	6	2	2	15	11	+4	20	2011 Copa Libertadores Second Stage
2	Oriente Petrolero	10	6	1	3	18	11	+7	19	
3	Aurora	10	4	2	4	19	18	+1	14	
4	The Strongest	10	3	4	3	15	14	+1	13	2011 Copa Sudamericana First Stage (Note: The Strongest qualified for the 2011 Copa Sudamericana, as Oriente Petrolero later qualified for the 2011 Copa Libertadores and Aurora also later qualified for the 2011 Copa Sudamericana through the Clausura.)
5	Bolívar	10	3	2	5	7	14	−7	11	
6	San José	10	1	3	6	13	24	−11	6	

Source: Soccer Way
Rules for classification: 1) points; 2) goal difference; 3) number of goals scored.

==== Results by round ====
Round	1	2	3	4	5	6	7	8	9	10	11	12
Ground	A	H	A	A	H	H	A	H	H	A		
Result	D	W	D	L	W	L	L	W	L	L		
Position	3	2	3	4	3	4	4	4	5	5		

Updated to match(es) played on 13 April. Source: Matches
A = Away; H = Home; W = Win; D = Draw; L = Loss
10 May 2010
18:00

The Strongest	1 – 1	Bolivar
Luis Palacios 1'	(Report)	William Ferreira 37'

Estadio Hernando Siles, La Paz
Attendance: 43,000
Referee: Alejandro Mancilla

13 May 2010
19:00

Bolivar	1 – 0	San Jose
Alex da Rosa 83'	(Report)

Estadio Hernando Siles, La Paz
Attendance: 27,000
Referee: Jose Jordan

17 May 2010
20:00

Aurora	2 – 2	Bolivar
Carlos Saucedo 32'; Ignacio Garcia 86'	(Report)	Rudy Cardozo 33', 67'

Estadio Felix Capriles, Cochabamba
Attendance: 37,000
Referee: Joaquin Artequera

21 May 2010
19:30

Jorge Wilstermann	2 – 0	Bolivar
Nicolas Raimondi 21'; Fernando Sanjurjo 49'	(Report)

Estadio Felix Capriles, Cochabamba
Attendance: 38,000
Referee: Joauin Antequera

24 May 2010
15:30

Bolivar	2 – 1	Oriente Petrolero
Enrique Parada 29'; William Ferreira 54'	(Report)	Joselito Vaca 65'

Estadio Hernando Siles, La Paz
Attendance: 23,000
Referee: Ivan Gamboa

27 May 2010
16:30

Bolivar	0 – 1	The Strongest
	(Report)	Julian di Cosmo 47'

Estadio Hernando Siles, La Paz
Attendance: 40,000
Referee: Alejandro Mancilla

31 May 2010
15:30

San Jose	4 – 3	Bolivar
Cristian Diaz 13', 24', 59', 86'	(Report)	Charles da Silva 18'; Anderson Gonzaga 63'; Luis Torrico 83'

Estadio Jesús Bermúdez, Oruro
Attendance: 30,000
Referee: Raul Orrozco

3 June 2010
19:30

Bolivar	1 – 0	Aurora
William Ferreira 59'	(Report)

Estadio Hernando Siles, La Paz
Attendance: 27,000
Referee: Gary Vargas

7 June 2010
15:00

Bolivar	0 – 1	Jorge Wilstermann
	(Report)	Fernando Sanjurjo 3'

Estadio Hernando Siles, La Paz
Attendance: 39,000
Referee: Nelio Garcia

9 June 2010
20:00

Oriente Petrolero	2–0	Bolivar
Alcides Peña 9'; Alcides Peña (yellow card) 9'; Francisco Arguello (yellow card) 32'; Luis Gutierrez (yellow card) 53'; Jhasmani Campos 61'; Lorgio Suárez (yellow card) 78'	(Report)	Didi Torrico (yellow card) 23'; Ronald Rivero (yellow card) 27'; Charles Da Silva (yellow card) 66'

Estadio Tahuichi Aguilera, Santa Cruz
Attendance: 37,000
Referee: José Jordán

== Torneo Invierno ==
=== First stage ===
Teams			Scores		Tie-breakers		
Team #1	Points	Team #2	1st leg	2nd leg	GD	AG	Pen.
Bolívar	3:3	The Strongest	2–0	0–2	0:0	0:0	4–3

18 June 2010
20:00

Bolivar	2 – 0	The Strongest
Rudy Cardozo 18'; William Ferreira 88'	(Report)

Estadio Hernando Siles, La Paz
Attendance: 4,000
Referee: Nelio Garcia

21 June 2010
20:00

The Strongest	2 – 0	Bolivar
Julian di Cosmo 43'; Pablo Vasquez 88'	(Report)

Estadio Hernando Siles, La Paz
Attendance: 5,000
Referee: Gary Vargas

=== Second stage ===
For the second stage, if a tie in points exists after the end of the second leg, the match will go directly into a penalty shootout as per the Laws of the Game.

Teams			Scores		Tie-breaker
Team #1	Points	Team #2	1st leg	2nd leg	Pen.
Real Mamoré	1:4	Oriente Petrolero	1–1	0–3	–
San José	4:1	The Strongest	0–0	2–1	–
Real Potosí	3:3	Bolívar	5–3	1–4	3–5
Jorge Wilstermann	3:3	Blooming	2–0	0–3	4–1

25 June 2010
20:00

Real Potosi	5 – 3	Bolivar
Cristian Ruiz 2', 19', 61'; Ronny Jiménez 55'; Miguel Loayza 75'	(Report)	Rudy Cardozo 32'; Limbert Mendez 34'; Leonel Reyes 90'

Estadio Victor Agustín Ugarte, Potosí
Attendance: 4,500
Referee: Ivan Gamboa

28 June 2010
16:00

Bolivar	4 – 1	Real Potosi
William Ferreira 7', 19'; Alex da Rosa 44', 86'	(Report)	Cristian Ruiz 66'

Estadio Hernando Siles, La Paz
Attendance: 3,000
Referee: Oscar Maldonado

=== Semifinals ===
Teams			Scores		
Team #1	Points	Team #2	1st leg	2nd leg	Playoff
Oriente Petrolero	6:0	Jorge Wilstermann	3–1	1–0	—
San José	3:3	Bolívar	1–0	1–5	

2 July 2010
15:00

San José	1 – 0	Bolivar
Ronald Puma 38'	(Report)

Estadio Jesús Bermúdez, Oruro
Attendance: 5,500
Referee: Raul Orozco

5 July 2010
16:00

Bolivar	5 – 1	San José
William Ferreira 45', 60', 75', 92', 93'	(Report)	Oscar Diaz 64'

Estadio Hernando Siles, La Paz
Attendance: 7,000
Referee: Jose Jordan

== Torneo Clausura ==
=== Standings ===
Pos	Team	Pld	W	D	L	GF	GA	GD	Pts	Qualification
1	Oriente Petrolero	22	12	4	6	38	26	+12	40	2011 Copa Libertadores Second Stage
2	Bolívar	22	10	6	6	37	28	+9	36	2011 Copa Libertadores First Stage
3	Aurora	22	10	4	8	34	30	+4	34	2011 Copa Sudamericana Second Stage (Note: Aurora was given the Second Stage spot in the 2011 Copa Sudamericana by the decision of the Bolivian Football Federation.)
4	San José	22	10	4	8	39	37	+2	34	
5	Guabirá	22	9	5	8	22	28	−6	32	

Rules for classification: 1) points; 2) goal difference; 3) number of goals scored.

=== Results by round ===
Round	1	2	3	4	5	6	7	8	9	10	11	12	13	14	15	16	17	18	19	20	21	22
Ground	A	H	A	H	A	H	A	A	H	A	H	H										
Result	W	D	L	W	P	W	W	L														
Position																						

Updated to match(es) played on 13 April. Source: Matches
A = Away; H = Home; W = Win; D = Draw; L = Loss; P = Postponed
26 July 2010
19:00

Jorge Wilstermann	0 – 1	Bolivar
	(Report)	Luis A. Torrico 62'

Estadio Felix Capriles, Cochabamba
Referee: Juan Nelio Garcia

2 August 2010
19:00

Bolivar	2 – 2	The Strongest
Rudy Cardozo 55'; William Ferreira 72'	(Report)	Darwin Peña 20'; Gerson Garcia 31'

Estadio Hernando Siles, La Paz
Referee: Jose Jordan

8 August 2010
19:00

Guabirá	1 – 0	Guabirá
Bruno Juárez 27'	(Report)

Estadio Gilberto Parada, Montero
Referee: Alejandro Mancilla

14 August 2010
16:00

Bolivar	2 – 0	Real Potosi
William Ferreira 5'; Álex da Rosa 71'	(Report)

Estadio Hernando Siles, La Paz
Referee: Gery Vargas
