= 2012–13 Club Bolívar season =

Club Bolívar
2012–2013 season
- Chairman: (Bolivia) Guido Loayza & Marcelo Claure
- Manager: (Spain) Miguel Angel Portugal
- Stadium: Estadio Hernando Siles, La Paz
- Clausura: 1st (champions)
- Top goalscorer: (Bolivia) Juan Carlos Arce (20 goals)

The 2012-13 season is Bolívar's 36th competitive season in the Liga de Fútbol Profesional Boliviano, and 87th year in existence as a football club. To see more news about Bolivar see Bolivar Official Website

== Transfers ==
=== In ===
No.	Position	Player	Transferred from	Type	Ends	Fee	Source
1	GK	(Argentina) Marcos Argüello	Unknown	Free transfer	2014	Free	clubbolivar.com
8	FW	(Uruguay) William Ferreira	Liverpool (Uruguay)	Free transfer	2015	Free	clubbolivar.com
19	DF	(Paraguay) Nelson Cabrera	Chongqing Lifan F.C. (China)	Free transfer	2014	Free	clubbolivar.com
7	MF	(Argentina) José D'Angelo	Rangers (Chile)	Free transfer	2012	Free	clubbolivar.com
	DF	(Bolivia) Leonel Morales	Universitario (Bolivia)	Transfer	2016	Undisclosed	clubbolivar.com

=== Out ===
No.	Pos.	Player	Transferred to	Type	Fee	Source
27	FW	(Panama) Luis Rentería	Tauro F.C. (Panama)	Free transfer	Free	bolivar.com.bo
8	FW	(Paraguay) Ever Cantero	Cobresal (Chile)	Free transfer	Free
1	GK	(Bolivia) Carlos Lampe	San José (Bolivia)	Free transfer	Free
x	DF	(Bolivia) Jorge Cuellar	Universitario de Sucre (Bolivia)	Loan out	Free
x	DF	(Bolivia) Alejandro Mendez	Ciclón (Bolivia)	Loan out	Free
x	MF	(Bolivia) Diego Rivero	Ciclón (Bolivia)	Loan out	Free
x	MF	(Bolivia) Jeison Siquita	Flamengo (Bolivia)	Loan out	Free
7	MF	(Argentina) Damián Lizio	Unión de Santa Fe (Argentina)	Loan out	Undisclosed

== First Team Squad ==
The squad will be announced on January 13

No.	Position	Nationality	Player	Age	Since	Ends	Signed From
Goalkeepers
1	GK	(Argentina)	Marcos Arguello	45	2011	2014	(Argentina) Chacarita Juniors
15	GK	(Bolivia)	Romel Quiñones	34	2010	2015	(Bolivia) Club Bolívar
12	GK	(Bolivia)	Diego Zamora	33	2010	unknown	(Bolivia) Club Bolívar
Defenders
19	CB	(Paraguay)	Nelson Cabrera	43	2013	2014	(Paraguay) Olimpia
2	CB	(Bolivia)	Tobías Albarracín	40	2012	2013	(Argentina) La Rioja
3	CB	(Bolivia)	Juan Gabriel Valverde	36	2009	unknown	(Bolivia) Club Bolívar
21	RB	(Bolivia)	Ronald Eguino	38	2011	2013	(Bolivia) Real Potosí
4	LB	(Bolivia)	Lorgio Alvarez	48	2011	2013	(Bolivia) Club Blooming
5	RB	(Bolivia)	Christian Vargas	43	2012	2013	(Bolivia) Wilstermann
14	RB	(Bolivia)	Ariel Juarez	38	2006	2013	(Bolivia) Club Bolívar
18	LB	(Bolivia)	José Carlos Barba	41	2012	2014	(Bolivia) Blooming
	LB	(Bolivia)	Leonel Morales	38	2013	2016	(Bolivia) Universitario
26	LB	(Bolivia)	Leandro Maygua	34	2012	unknown	(Bolivia) Club Bolívar
Midfielders
16	DM	(Bolivia)	Wálter Flores	47	2009	2014	(Bolivia) San José
25	DM	(Bolivia)	Damir Miranda	41	2011	2013	(Bolivia) Club Destroyers
28	DM	(Bolivia)	Alejandro Gómez	47	2012	2013	(Bolivia) Blooming
23	DM	(Bolivia)	Leonel Justiniano	34	2010	unknown	(Bolivia) Club Bolívar
10	AM	(Bolivia)	Rudy Cardozo	36	2009	2014	(Bolivia) Club Bolívar
9	AM	(Bolivia)	Jhasmani Campos	38	2011	2015	(Bolivia) Oriente Petrolero
7	AM	(Bolivia)	José D'Angelo	37	2013	2014	(Argentina) Chacarita Juniors
7	AM	(Argentina)	Damián Lizio	37	2011	2015	(Argentina) River Plate
Forwards
8	CF	(Uruguay)	William Ferreira	43	2009	2014	(Uruguay) Club Nacional de Football
17	CF	(Bolivia)	Juan Carlos Arce	41	2012	2014	(Bolivia) Oriente Petrolero
11	CF	(Bolivia)	Gerardo Yecerotte	41	2012	2013	(Bolivia) Real Potosí
22	CF	(Bolivia)	Miguel Suárez	33	2011	unknown	(Bolivia) Club Bolívar

== Coaching staff ==
Position	Staff
Manager	(Spain) Miguel Ángel Portugal
Assistant manager	(Bolivia) Vladimir Soria
Goalkeeper coach	(Bolivia) Nery Quintana
First-team fitness coach	(Bolivia) Gonzalo Abando
First-team doctor	(Bolivia) Guillermo Aponte
Reserve team manager	(Bolivia) Óscar Villegas

== Competitions ==
=== Copa Libertadores ===
==== Squad ====
Note: Flags indicate national team as defined under FIFA eligibility rules; some limited exceptions apply. Players may hold more than one non-FIFA nationality.

No.	Pos.	Nation	Player
1	GK	BOL	R. Quiñonez
2	DF	ARG	T. Albaracín
3	MF	BOL	G. Valverde
4	DF	BOL	Lorgio
5	DF	BOL	C. Vargas
6	MF	BOL	A. Gómez
7	MF	ARG	Lizio
8	FW	URU	W. Ferreira
10	MF	BOL	R. Cardozo
11	FW	BOL	G. Yeserotte

No.	Pos.	Nation	Player
13	GK	ARG	M. Argüello
14	DF	PAR	N. Cabrera
15	GK	BOL	D. Zamora
16	MF	BOL	Wálter (captain)
17	DF	BOL	J. C. Arce
20	DF	BOL	Maygua
21	DF	BOL	R. Eguino
23	MF	BOL	L. Justiniano
25	MF	BOL	Miranda

==== First stage ====
Teams			Scores		Tie-breakers
Team #1	Points	Team #2	1st leg	2nd leg	GD
Bolívar	3:3	São Paulo FC	0 – 5	4 – 3	-4:4

Win Draw Loss

January 23 First leg	São Paulo FC	5 – 0	Bolívar	São Paulo
	Osvaldo 8'; Luís Fabiano 21', 45+2'; Jádson 60'; Rogério Ceni 63' (pen.)			Stadium: Estádio Cícero Pompeu de Toledo (Morumbi); Attendance: 41,838; Referee: Roberto Silvera (Uruguay)

30 January Second leg	Bolívar	4 – 3 (4 – 8 agg.)	São Paulo	La Paz
22:00 UTC−02:00	Ferreira 38', 75' (pen.); Cabrera 59', 69'		Luís Fabiano 2'; Jádson 16'; Osvaldo 35'	Stadium: Estadio Hernando Siles; Referee: Wilmar Roldan (Colombia)

=== Torneo Clausura ===
==== Squad ====
Note: Flags indicate national team as defined under FIFA eligibility rules; some limited exceptions apply. Players may hold more than one non-FIFA nationality.

No.	Pos.	Nation	Player
1	GK	ARG	M. Argüello
2	DF	ARG	T. Albarracín
3	MF	BOL	G. Valverde
4	DF	BOL	Lorgio
5	DF	BOL	C. Vargas
7	MF	ARG	D. Lizio
8	FW	URU	W. Ferreira
9	MF	BOL	J. Campos
10	MF	BOL	R. Cardozo
11	FW	BOL	G. Yeserotte
12	GK	BOL	D. Zamora
14	DF	BOL	A. Juarez
15	GK	BOL	R. Quiñonez

No.	Pos.	Nation	Player
16	MF	BOL	Wálter (captain)
17	FW	BOL	J.C. Arce
18	DF	BOL	J.C. Barba
19	DF	PAR	N. Cabrera
20	MF	ARG	D'angelo
21	DF	BOL	R. Eguino
22	FW	BOL	M. Suárez
23	MF	BOL	L. Justiniano
24	DF	BOL	L. Morales
25	MF	BOL	Miranda
26	DF	BOL	Maygua
28	MF	BOL	A. Gómez

==== Results summary ====
Overall								Home						Away					
Pld	W	D	L	GF	GA	GD	Pts	W	D	L	GF	GA	GD	W	D	L	GF	GA	GD
22	16	2	4	50	30	+20	50	9	2	0	26	13	+13	7	0	4	24	17	+7

Last updated: 13 February 2013.
Source: clubbolivar.com

==== Results by round ====
Round	1	2	3	4	5	6	7	8	9	10	11	12	13	14	15	16	17	18	19	20	21	22
Ground	A	H	H	H	A	H	A	A	H	A	H	H	H	H	H	A	A	H	H	A	H	A
Result	L	P	W	W	W	W	W	W	D	W	W	W	L	W	W	W	L	W	W	W	W	L
Position	10	10	9	9	9	8	2	4	2	1	1	1	2	2	2	1	1	1	1	1	1	1

Updated to match(es) played on 13 March 2013. Source: clubbolivar.com
A = Away; H = Home; W = Win; D = Draw; L = Loss; P = Postponed

==== Matches ====
Win Draw Loss

January 13 Round 1	Blooming	2 – 1	Bolívar	Santa Cruz
	Sanchez 44'; Bargas 21', 75'		Gómez 17'	Stadium: Gilberto Parada; Referee: Oscar Maldonado (Bolivia)

January 19 Round 3	Bolívar	1 – 0	La Paz FC	La Paz
	Ferreira 60'			Stadium: Hernando Siles; Referee: Alejandro Mancilla (Bolivia)

February 3 Round 6	Bolívar	2 – 1	Oriente	La Paz
	Cardozo 9'; William Ferreira 21', 90+3'		Vargas 78'	Stadium: Hernando Siles; Referee: Alejandro Mancilla (Bolivia)

February 9 Round 4	Bolívar	2 – 1	Real Potosí	La Paz
	Ferreira 66'; Cardozo 21', 84'		Neumann 38'	Stadium: Hernando Siles; Referee: Gery Vargas (Bolivia)

February 13 Round 8	San José	1 – 2	Bolívar	Oruro
	Ovando 2'		Cardozo 19'; Ferreira 60'	Stadium: Jesús Bermudez; Referee: Oscar Maldonado (Bolivia)

February 17 Round 7	Petrolero	1 – 4	Bolívar	Villamontes
16:00	Ferreira 3', 6'; Cardozo 33'; Gómez 64'		Oni 31'	Stadium: Estadio Defensores de Villamontes; Referee: Jose Jordan

February 23 Round 9	Bolívar	2 – 2	Universitario	La Paz
21:15	Gómez 45+1'; William Ferreira 49'		Gallegos 54', 88'	Stadium: Hernando Siles; Referee: Juan Nelio García

February 27 Round 5	Aurora	2 – 3	Bolívar	Cochabamba
20:00	Olivares 8'; Vargas 87'		Arce 4'; Ferreira 45+2'; Cardozo 72'	Stadium: Félix Capriles; Referee: Alejandro Mancilla

March 3 Round 10	Nacional Potosí	1 – 4	Bolívar	Potosí
15:30	Tudor 36'		Cardozo 28', 81'; Arce 61'; Ferreira 77'	Stadium: Víctor Agustín Ugarte; Referee: Juaquin Antequera

March 10 Round 11	Bolívar	5 – 3	Wilstermann	La Paz
16:00	Ferreira 11', 57', 87'; Arce 64'; Campos 84'		García 4'; Aparicio 63', 89'	Stadium: Hernando Siles; Referee: Gery Vargas

March 31 Round 12	Bolívar	3 – 1	Blooming	La Paz
16:00	Campos 53'; Miranda 76'; Yecerotte 90+3'		Bargas 8'	Stadium: Hernando Siles

April 10 Round 13	The Strongest	2 – 0	Bolívar	La Paz
20:00	Reina 14'; Escobar 46'			Stadium: Hernando Siles

April 14 Round 14	La Paz FC	1 – 3	Bolívar	La Paz
16:00		Charupi 86'	Arce 56', 63', 78'	Stadium: Hernando Siles

April 17 Round 15	Bolívar	4 – 2	Aurora	La Paz
20:00	Ferreira 33'; Campos 48' Arce 59'; Cardozo 74'		Vargas 19'; Albarracín	Stadium: Hernando Siles

March 21 Round 15	Real Potosí	0 – 2	Bolívar	Potosí
15:30			Cardozo 24'; Arce 50'	Stadium: Víctor Agustín Ugarte; Referee: Juaquin Antequera

March 24 Round 2	Bolívar	1 – 1	The Strongest	La Paz
20:00	Justiniano 58'		Escobar 56'	Stadium: Hernando Siles; Referee: Ó. Maldonado

April 28 Round 17	Wilstermann	5 – 0	Bolívar	Cochabamba
16:00	Salinas 11', 42'; Romero 14'; Berodia 35'; Zenteno 52'			Stadium: Félix Capriles; Referee: G. Vargas

February 17 Round 18	Bolívar	2 – 0	Petrolero	La Paz
20:00	Eguino 21'; Yecerottes 33'			Stadium: Hernando Siles; Referee: J. Mancilla

May 8 Round 19	Bolívar	2 – 1	San José	La Paz
20:00	Arce 41'; Ferreira 83'		Saucedo 39'	Stadium: Hernando Siles; Referee: J. Jordán

May 12 Round 20	Universitario	0 – 4	Bolívar	Sucre
16:00			Ferreira 17'; Campos 37'; Arce 77'; Cardozo 84'	Stadium: Patria; Referee: R. Orozco

May 19 Round 21	Bolívar	2 – 1	Nacional Potosí	La Paz
16:00	Ferreira 1', 37'			Stadium: Hernando Siles; Referee: G. Vargas

May 26 Round 22	Oriente	2 – 1	Bolívar	Santa Cruz
	Arce 24'; Valverde 10' O.G.		Carando 35'	Stadium: Tahuichi; Referee: J. Mancilla

=== Standings ===
Pos	Team	Pld	W	D	L	GF	GA	GD	Pts	Qualification
1	Bolívar	22	16	2	4	50	30	+20	50	2014 Copa Libertadores Second Stage
2	Oriente Petrolero	22	14	5	3	43	25	+18	47	2014 Copa Libertadores First Stage
3	San José	22	12	5	5	37	21	+16	41	2014 Copa Sudamericana First Stage
4	Universitario de Sucre	22	10	5	7	30	24	+6	35	
5	The Strongest	22	9	7	6	40	35	+5	34	

Updated to match(es) played on May 2013. Source:
Rules for classification: 1) points; 2) goal difference; 3) number of goals scored.

=== Statistics ===
Includes all competitive matches.

LIGA and Libertadores
No.	P	Player	A.	Goal	Booked	Booked Sent off (straight red)	Sent off (straight red)	A.	Goal	Booked	Booked Sent off (straight red)	Sent off (straight red)			
No.	P	Player	1	GK	(Argentina) Marcos Arguello	20	0	1	0	0	2	0	0	0	0
15	GK	(Bolivia) Romel Quiñones	4	0	1	0	0	0	0	0	0	0			
12	GK	(Bolivia) Diego Zamora	0	0	0	0	0	0	0	0	0	0			
19	CB	(Paraguay) Nelson Cabrera	14	0	1	0	1	2	2	1	0	0			
2	CB	(Argentina) Tobías Albarracín	15	0	5	1	0	1	0	0	0	0			
3	CB	(Bolivia) Juan Gabriel Valverde	7	0	2	0	0	1	0	0	0	0			
21	RB	(Bolivia) Ronald Eguino	11	1	2	0	0	2	0	0	0	0			
4	LB	(Bolivia) Lorgio Alvarez	14	0	3	0	1	2	0	0	0	0			
5	RB	(Bolivia) Christian Vargas	10	0	4	1	0	0	0	0	0	0			
14	RB	(Bolivia) Ariel Juarez	3	0	0	1	0	0	0	0	0	0			
18	LB	(Bolivia) José Carlos Barba	3	0	0	0	0	0	0	0	0	0			
20	LB	(Bolivia) Leonel Morales	10	0	1	0	0	0	0	0	0	0			
26	LB	(Bolivia) Leandro Maygua	15	0	1	0	0	1	0	0	0	0			
16	DM	(Bolivia) Wálter Flores	14	0	6	0	0	2	0	1	0	0			
25	DM	(Bolivia) Damir Miranda	20	1	3	0	0	2	0	0	0	0			
28	DM	(Bolivia) Alejandro Gómez	12	3	1	1	0	1	0	1	0	0			
23	DM	(Bolivia) Leonel Justiniano	17	1	5	0	0	2	0	0	0	0			
10	AM	(Bolivia) Rudy Cardozo	20	10	4	0	0	2	0	0	0	0			
9	AM	(Bolivia) Jhasmani Campos	17	4	3	0	0	0	0	0	0	0			
7	AM	(Argentina) José D'Angelo	3	0	0	0	0	0	0	0	0	0			
7	AM	(Argentina) Damián Lizio	2	0	0	0	0	2	0	1	0	0			
8	CF	(Uruguay) William Ferreira	21	17	3	0	0	2	2	0	0	0			
17	CF	(Bolivia) Juan Carlos Arce	21	10	5	0	0	2	0	0	0	0			
11	CF	(Bolivia) Gerardo Yecerotte	17	2	5	1	1	2	0	0	0	0			
22	CF	(Bolivia) Miguel Suárez	14	0	1	0	0	0	0	0	0	0			
