= 2009 Liga de Fútbol Profesional Boliviano =

Liga de Fútbol Profesional Boliviano
- Season: 2009
- Champions: Apertura: Bolívar (16th title); Clausura: Blooming (5th title)
- Relegated: Nacional Potosí
- Copa Libertadores: Bolívar; Blooming; Real Potosí
- Copa Sudamericana: Oriente Petrolero; San José; TBD
- Top goalscorer: Apertura: William Ferreira (16 goals); Clausura: Cristian Díaz, William Ferreira, Pastor Tórrez (9 goals each)
- Biggest home win: San José 5–0 La Paz (June 25)
- Biggest away win: Nacional Potosí 0–5 Oriente Petrolero (June 14)
- Highest scoring: Real Mamoré 5–4 Nacional Potosí (June 28)

The 2009 Liga de Fútbol Profesional Boliviano season was the 33rd of Bolivia's top-flight professional football league. The season was split into two championships—the Apertura and the Clausura—and the Play-off

== Format ==
The 2009 season will be divided into two championships, each with their own format.

Apertura

The Apertura championship will be a double round-robin league format. The team with the most points after the twenty-two rounds will be declared the champion.

Clausura

The Clausura championship will be divided into two phases. The first phase will have the twelve team divided into two groups. The teams will play within each group, in addition to a cross-group rivalry (for example: Bolívar vs. The Strongest). The best three teams in each group will advance to the second phase. In the second phase, the best teams from each group will play the third best team from each group and the second best teams will play each other. The three winners of each match, plus the best loser, then play each other in the semifinals and will start of a two-legged single-elimination play-off that culminates in a final match-up. The winner of the final is the tournament champion.

The winners of each championship will earn a berth in the 2010 Copa Libertadores and the runners-up will earn a berth in the 2010 Copa Sudamericana.

== Teams ==
The amount of team remains the same for this season. Guabirá was relegated at the end of the 2008 season to the regional leagues. They were replaced by Nacional Potosí.

Locations of the 2009 LFPB teams

Team	Home city	Home stadium
Aurora	Cochabamba	Estadio Félix Capriles
Blooming	Santa Cruz	Estadio Tahuichi Aguilera
Bolívar	La Paz	Estadio Libertador Simón Bolívar
Jorge Wilstermann	Cochabamba	Estadio Félix Capriles
La Paz	La Paz	Estadio Hernando Siles
Nacional Potosí	Potosí	Estadio Victor Agustín Ugarte
Oriente Petrolero	Santa Cruz	Estadio Tahuichi Aguilera
Real Mamoré	Trinidad	Estadio Gran Mamoré
Real Potosí	Potosí	Estadio Victor Agustín Ugarte
San José	Oruro	Estadio Jesús Bermúdez
The Strongest	La Paz	Estadio Rafael Mendoza
Universitario de Sucre	Sucre	Estadio Olímpico Patria

=== Managerial changes ===
Team	Outgoing manager	Manner of departure	Date of vacancy	Replaced by	Date of appointment	Position in table
Oriente Petrolero	(Argentina) Pablo Sánchez	Resigned	2 October 2009	(Bolivia) Marco Etcheverry	7 October 2009	4th (Apertura), 3rd (Clausura)
Bolivar	(Argentina) Gustavo Quinteros	Resigned	10 November 2009	(Colombia) Santiago Escobar	12 November 2009	1st (Apertura), 2nd (Clausura) Eliminated in the Final.

== Torneo Apertura ==
The Torneo Apertura was the first championship of the season. It began on February 7 and ended on July 6.

=== Standings ===
Pos	Team	Pld	W	D	L	GF	GA	GD	Pts	Qualification
1	Bolívar	22	11	7	4	36	22	+14	40	2010 Copa Libertadores Second Stage
2	Real Potosí	22	11	6	5	45	31	+14	39	
3	San José	22	11	2	9	53	35	+18	35	2010 Copa Sudamericana Second Stage
4	Oriente Petrolero	22	10	5	7	33	30	+3	35	
5	Universitario de Sucre	22	11	3	8	38	27	+11	33 (Note: Universitario was docked three points for not fielding enough Bolivian nationals in Round 19.)	
6	The Strongest	22	9	5	8	36	35	+1	32	
7	La Paz	22	9	5	8	38	39	−1	32	
8	Nacional Potosí	22	7	7	8	36	40	−4	28	
9	Blooming	22	7	6	9	24	32	−8	27	
10	Aurora	22	7	5	10	26	33	−7	26	
11	Jorge Wilstermann	22	3	8	11	22	38	−16	17	
12	Real Mamoré	22	4	5	13	25	50	−25	17	

Source: RSSSF
Rules for classification: 1) points; 2) goal difference; 3) number of goals scored.
Notes:

Liga de Fútbol Profesional Boliviano
2009 Apertura champion

16th title

=== Results ===
Home \ Away	AUR	BLO	BOL	WIL	LPA	NAC	OPE	RMA	RPO	SJO	STR	UNI
Aurora												
Blooming							–					
Bolívar												
Jorge Wilstermann												
La Paz												
Nacional Potosí												
Oriente Petrolero		2–0						1–0	2–3			
Real Mamoré												
Real Potosí												
San José												
The Strongest												
Universitario de Sucre												

Updated to match(es) played on July 5, 2009. Source: RSSSF
Legend: Blue = home team win; Yellow = draw; Red = away team win.

=== Top-five goalscorers ===
Pos	Name	Club	Goals
1	(Uruguay) William Ferreira	Bolívar	16
2	(Bolivia) Abdón Reyes	Bolívar	11
2	(Argentina) Hernán Boyero	Blooming	11
3	(Bolivia) Luis Gatty Ribeiro	Real Potosí	10
3	(Bolivia) Álex da Rosa	San José	10
3	(Bolivia) Sacha Lima	Universitario de Sucre	10

== Torneo Clausura ==
The Torneo Clausura is the second championship of the season. It began on July 18 and is scheduled to end in December.

=== First phase ===
Key to colors in group tables
Advances to Second Phase

==== Serie A ====
Standings

Pos	Team	Pld	W	D	L	GF	GA	GD	Pts
1	Bolívar (A)	12	7	4	1	25	13	+12	25
2	Universitario de Sucre (A)	12	5	3	4	11	13	−2	18
3	Blooming (A)	12	5	3	4	16	19	−3	18
4	San José	12	3	6	3	24	17	+7	15
5	Jorge Wilstermann	12	4	3	5	14	15	−1	15
6	Nacional Potosí	12	2	2	8	10	21	−11	8

Updated to match(es) played on September 17, 2009. Source: RSSSF
Rules for classification: 1) points; 2) goal difference; 3) number of goals scored.
(A) Advance to a further round

Results

Home \ Away	BLO	BOL	WIL	NAC	SJO	UNI
Blooming		2–1	2–1	1–0	1–1	4–0
Bolívar	4–1		1–1	3–2	2–2	2–1
Jorge Wilstermann	0–1	4–0		2–0	2–0	2–2
Nacional Potosí	2–0	0–3	0–2		2–1	0–0
San José	4–1	2–2	2–2	1–1		1–3
Universitario de Sucre	2–0	0–0	2–1	1–0	1–3	

Updated to match(es) played on September 17, 2009. Source: RSSSF
Legend: Blue = home team win; Yellow = draw; Red = away team win.

==== Serie B ====
Standings

Pos	Team	Pld	W	D	L	GF	GA	GD	Pts
1	Real Potosí (A)	12	7	1	4	23	14	+9	22
2	The Strongest (A)	12	6	3	3	19	15	+4	21
3	Oriente Petrolero (A)	12	5	4	3	12	12	0	19
4	Real Mamoré	12	5	1	6	16	18	−2	16
5	Aurora	12	3	2	7	8	14	−6	11
6	La Paz	12	2	4	6	18	25	−7	10

Updated to match(es) played on September 17, 2009. Source: RSSSF
Rules for classification: 1) points; 2) goal difference; 3) number of goals scored.
(A) Advance to a further round

Results

Home \ Away	AUR	LPA	OPE	RMA	RPO	STR
Aurora		1–1	0–0	3–0	1–0	0–1
La Paz	1–0		3–0	2–3	2–3	2–2
Oriente Petrolero	2–0	0–0		1–0	1–0	2–0
Real Mamoré	3–0	2–0	1–4		3–1	2–2
Real Potosí	2–0	4–2	3–0	2–0		1–3
The Strongest	1–0	3–2	2–0	2–1	1–1	

Updated to match(es) played on September 17, 2009. Source: RSSSF
Legend: Blue = home team win; Yellow = draw; Red = away team win.

==== Inter-series ====
Home team	Results	Away team
—
The Strongest	0–0	Bolívar
Bolívar	3–1	The Strongest
—
Universitario de Sucre	1–0	Real Mamore
Real Mamore	1–0	Universitario de Sucre
—
Blooming	1–1	Oriente Petrolero
Oriente Petrolero	2–2	Blooming
—
La Paz	1–5	San José
San José	2–2	La Paz
—
Jorge Wilstermann	2–1	Aurora
Aurora	2–1	Jorge Wilstermann
—
Nacional Potosí	0–2	Real Potosí
Real Potosí	4–1	Nacional Potosí

=== Second phase ===
Bolívar, Real Potosí, Oriente Petrolero, Blooming and The Strongest have advanced to the Second Phase of the championship. All games were played at the UTC-3 time zone.

Team 1	Agg.	Team 2	1st leg	2nd leg
Bolívar	1–1 (a)	Oriente Petrolero	1–1	0–0
Real Potosí	0–1	Blooming	0–0	0–1
Universitario de Sucre	3–4	The Strongest	2–2	1–2

September 20
15:30

Bolívar	1 – 1	Oriente Petrolero
Ferreira 93'		Peña 61'

Estadio Hernando Siles, La Paz
Attendance: 13,000
Referee: Óscar Maldonado

September 20
15:30

Real Potosí	0 – 0	Blooming

Estadio Victor Agustín Ugarte, Potosí
Attendance: 6,000

September 20
18:00

Universitario de Sucre	2 – 2	The Strongest
Gallegos 68'; Silero 83'		Gutiérrez 8'; Vázquez 39'

Estadio Olímpico Patria, Sucre
Attendance: 20,000
Referee: Reinan Gamboa

September 23
20:30

Oriente Petrolero	0 – 0	Bolívar

Estadio Ramón Tahuichi Aguilera, Santa Cruz
Attendance: 37,000

September 24
20:00

Blooming	1 – 0	Real Potosí
Akerman 7'

Estadio Ramón Tahuichi Aguilera, Santa Cruz
Attendance: 25,000

September 24
20:00

The Strongest	2 – 1	Universitario de Sucre
Leitao 3'; Chumacero 45'		Gomes 55'

Estadio Hernando Siles, La Paz
Attendance: 20,000

=== Semifinals ===
At this stage winner will face the best that qualified as best loser, while the other two qualifiers play each other. The games are round, "said the chairman of the Technical Committee of the League, Felipe Rodriguez. At this stage remains the system applied in the Copa Libertadores. Bolívar qualified as the best loser.

Team 1	Agg.	Team 2	1st leg	2nd leg
Bolívar	4–2	The Strongest	2–1	2–1
Oriente Petrolero	3–3 (a)	Blooming	3–2	0–1

September 27
20:00

The Strongest	1 – 2	Bolivar
Vázquez 70'		Ferreira 27', 35'

Estadio Hernando Siles, La Paz
Attendance: 35,000
Referee: Raul Horosco

September 27
20:30

Oriente Petrolero	3 – 2	Blooming
Campos 17'; Peña 60', 18'		Akerman 40'; Chávez 78'

Estadio Ramón Tahuichi Aguilera, Santa Cruz
Attendance: 37,400
Referee: José Jordan

September 30
19:00

Bolívar	2 – 1	The Strongest
Gonzaga 60'; Da Silva 84'		Saucedo 64'

Estadio Hernando Siles, La Paz

September 30
21:00

Blooming	1 – 0	Oriente Petrolero
Akerman 49'

Estadio Ramón Tahuichi Aguilera, Santa Cruz

=== Finals ===
Team 1	Agg.	Team 2	1st leg	2nd leg
Blooming	2–1	Bolívar	1–0	1–1

October 18
20:00

Blooming	1 – 0	Bolívar
Viera 20'

Estadio Ramón Tahuichi Aguilera, Santa Cruz
Attendance: 40,000
Referee: Alejandro Mancilla

October 21
21:00

Bolívar	1 – 1	Blooming
Da Silva 70'		Suárez 26'

Estadio Hernando Siles, La Paz
Attendance: 44,100
Referee: José Jordán

Liga de Fútbol Profesional Boliviano
2009 Clausura champion

5th title

- Blooming qualified for 2010 Copa Libertadores Second Stage.
- Oriente Petrolero qualified for 2010 Copa Sudamericana First Stage.

=== Top-five goalscorers ===
Pos	Name	Club	Goals
1	(Uruguay) William Ferreira	Bolívar	16
2	(Argentina) Cristian Omar Díaz	San José	11
3	(Bolivia) Pastor Tórrez	Real Potosí	10
3	(Argentina) Hernán Boyero	Blooming	10
4	(Argentina) Pablo Vázquez	The Strongest	8

== Relegation table ==
Pos	Team	2008		2009		Total		Avg
Pos	Team	Pts	Pld	Pts	Pld	Pts	Pld	Avg
1	Bolívar	45	32	65	34	110	66	1.667
2	Universitario de Sucre	56	32	51	34	107	66	1.621
3	Oriente Petrolero	49	32	54	34	103	66	1.561
4	Real Potosí	41	32	61	34	102	66	1.545
5	Blooming	51	32	45	34	96	66	1.455
6	San José	45	32	50	34	95	66	1.439
6	La Paz	53	32	42	34	95	66	1.439
8	The Strongest	40	32	53	34	93	66	1.409
9	Aurora	49	32	37	34	86	66	1.303
10	Real Mamoré	40	32	33	34	73	66	1.106
11	Jorge Wilstermann	39	32	32	34	71	66	1.076
12	Nacional Potosí	0	0	36	34	36	34	1.059

Color key
Playoff match
Relegated to the Regional Leagues

=== Relegation/promotion playoff ===
Jorge Wilstermann will compete in a relegation/promotion playoff against the runner-up of the 2009 Copa Simón Bolívar.

Team #1	Points earned	Team #2	1st leg	2nd leg
Ciclón	1–4	Jorge Wilstermann	1–1	1–2

== Torneo play-off ==
=== First round ===
The First Round of the play-off began on October 31 and is scheduled to end on November 5. Team #1 will play the second leg at home. Real Potosí received a bye into the next round and Nacional Potosí could not participate since they were relegated.

Team #1	Points earned	Team #2	1st leg	2nd leg
La Paz	0–6	**San José**	0–1	0–1
The Strongest	3–3 (gd)	**Bolívar**	0–3	3–2
Aurora	1–4	**Jorge Wilstermann**	1–3	1–1
**Universitario de Sucre**	4–1	Real Mamoré	0–0	3–0
Blooming	1–4	**Oriente Petrolero**	0–1	1–1

Teams in bold advanced to the quarterfinals. Team in italics went to the Loser's Round.

=== Loser's Round ===
The Loser's Round is contested between the four best losers from the First Round. The two winners will advance to the "regular" semifinals.

==== Semifinals ====
The first leg was played on November 8, with the second leg played on November 14 and 15. Team #1 played the second leg at home.

Team #1	Points earned	Team #2	1st leg	2nd leg
**Aurora**	3–3 (4–3 p)	Blooming	1–2	3–1
Real Mamoré	1–4	**The Strongest**	2–3	2–2

==== Finals ====
The first leg is scheduled for November 18, with the second leg for November 22. Team #1 played the second leg at home. The winner advanced to the Semifinals.

Team #1	Points earned	Team #2	1st leg	2nd leg
**The Strongest**	6–0	Aurora	3–0	1–0

=== Quarterfinals ===
The first legs of the quarterfinals is scheduled for November 7 and 8, with the date for the second leg to be determined. Team #1 will play the second leg at home.

Team #1	Points earned	Team #2	1st leg	2nd leg
**Oriente Petrolero**	3–3 (5–4 p)	San José	0–2	1–0
**Real Potosí**	3–3 (4–3 p)	Jorge Wilstermann	1–2	2–1
Universitario de Sucre	1–4	**Bolívar**	1–2	3–3

=== Semifinals ===
The Semifinals began on November 21 and is scheduled to end on November 29. Team #1 will play the first leg at home. Unlike in other rounds, if both teams are tied on points, a playoff will be played at a neutral venue.

Team #1	Points	Team #2	1st leg	2nd leg	Playoff
Oriente Petrolero	1–5	**Bolívar**	2–2	2–2	1–2
**Real Potosí**	4–4 (3–1 p)	The Strongest	5–3	1–2	1–1

=== Finals ===
Team #1	Points earned	Team #2	1st leg	2nd leg
**Real Potosí**	4–1	Bolívar	1–1	4–3

Liga de Fútbol Profesional Boliviano
2009 Playoff winner

**2nd title**

- Real Potosí qualified for 2010 Copa Libertadores First Stage.
