= Christian Vargas =

Christian Vargas may refer to:

- Christian Vargas (Bolivian footballer) (born 1983), Bolivian football right-back
- Christian Vargas (Colombian footballer) (born 1989), Colombian football goalkeeper
