= Gustavo Quinteros =

Bolivian footballer and manager (born 1965)

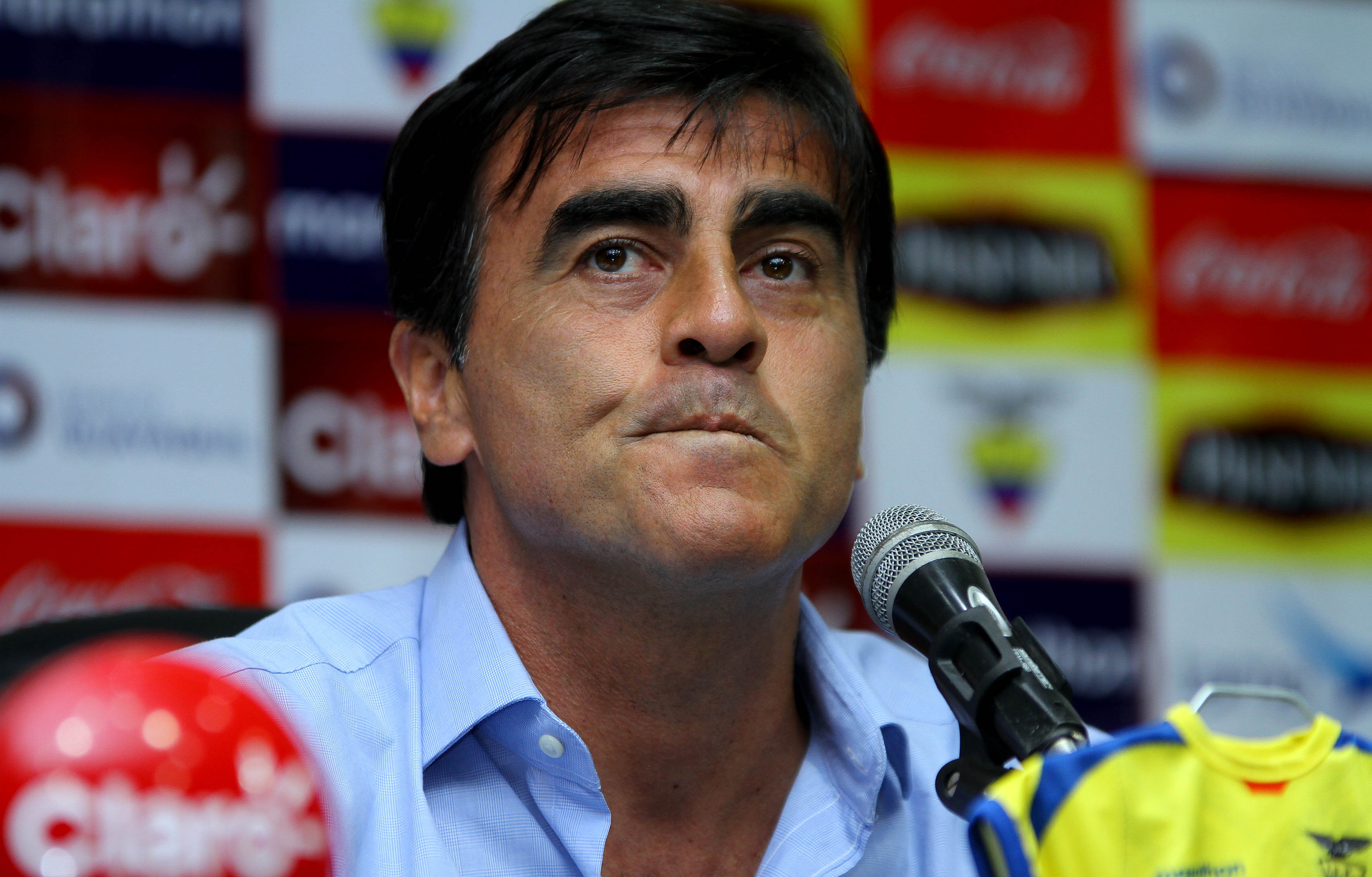
- Quinteros in 2015

Personal information
- Full name: Gustavo Domingo Quinteros Desábato
- Date of birth: 15 February 1965 (age 61)
- Place of birth: Cafferata, Argentina
- Height: 1.81 m (5 ft 11 in)
- Position: Centre-back

Youth career
- 1978: Newell's Old Boys
- 1982–1985: Newell's Old Boys

Senior career*
Years	Team	Apps	(Gls)
1986–1987	Central Córdoba (R)	21	(2)
1987–1988	Talleres (RdE)	17	(1)
1988	Universitario de Sucre	26	(8)
1989–1991	The Strongest	71	(9)
1992	San José	31	(7)
1993–1994	The Strongest	38	(4)
1994–1997	San Lorenzo	15	(1)
1997–1998	Argentinos Juniors	19	(0)
1999	Jorge Wilstermann	5	(0)
Total		243	(31)

International career
1993–1999	Bolivia	26	(1)

Managerial career
- 1999–2005: Argentinos Juniors (youth)
- 2003: Argentinos Juniors (caretaker)
- 2005–2006: Blooming
- 2006–2007: San Martín de San Juan
- 2007–2008: Blooming
- 2009: Bolívar
- 2010: Oriente Petrolero
- 2011–2012: Bolivia
- 2012–2015: Emelec
- 2015–2017: Ecuador
- 2017–2018: Al-Nassr
- 2018: Al Wasl
- 2019: Universidad Católica
- 2020: Tijuana
- 2020–2023: Colo-Colo
- 2024: Vélez Sarsfield
- 2025: Grêmio
- 2025–2026: Independiente
- * Club domestic league appearances and goals

Gustavo Domingo Quinteros Desábato (born 15 February 1965) is a football manager and former professional player who played mainly as a centre-back. He was recently the manager of Independiente.

Born in Argentina, Quinteros played for the Bolivia national team, representing the nation in the 1994 FIFA World Cup. After retiring, he became a manager, taking over clubs in his native Argentina, Bolivia, Ecuador (as well as both national teams), Saudi Arabia, United Arab Emirates, Chile and Mexico.

== Early life ==
Quinteros was born in Cafferata, a small town in the Santa Fe Province. A midfielder, he joined the youth sides of Newell's Old Boys at the age of 13, but only spent a year at the club before leaving. He returned to the side at the age of 17, while studying biochemistry and pharmacy at the National University of Rosario.

== Club career ==
Quinteros was unable to make a breakthrough at Newell's, only featuring as an unused substitute in a reserve team match in July 1985. Six months later, he joined Central Córdoba de Rosario, where he would make his senior debut.

In 1987, Quinteros signed for Talleres de Remedios de Escalada, being a part of the squad which won the 1987–88 Primera B Metropolitana. In the following year, after a failed move to a Primera B Nacional side, he moved to Bolivia and joined Universitario de Sucre.

After scoring eight goals for Universitario de Sucre, Quinteros moved to The Strongest for the 1989 season. At the latter club, he was converted into a centre-back, and established himself as a starter in that position. He later spent a one-season spell at San José, before returning to Strongest in 1994.

After the 1994 World Cup, Quinteros returned to his birth nation, signing a contract with San Lorenzo after the club paid a US$ 170,000 fee. He would never establish himself as a starter at the club, only making his Argentine Primera División debut on 6 May 1995, in a 2–1 away win over Deportivo Mandiyú.

Quinteros signed for Argentinos Juniors in 1997, before moving back to Bolivia in 1999 with Jorge Wilstermann. He retired with the latter club at the end of the season, aged 34.

== International career ==
Quinteros initially obtained Bolivian nationality to "free up foreign quota", but was later called up to the Bolivia national team in 1993. He made his full international debut on 29 January of that year, starting and scoring the opener in a 3–1 friendly win over Honduras at the Estadio Félix Capriles in Cochabamba.

Quinteros also played in the 1993, 1995 and 1999 editions of the Copa América, aside from the 1994 FIFA World Cup and the 1999 FIFA Confederations Cup. He represented the nation on 26 occasions.

== Managerial career ==
=== Argentinos Juniors ===
Shortly after retiring, Quinteros returned to Argentinos Juniors to work as their youth manager. In July 2003, he was named in charge of the first team, replacing Ricardo Gareca, but was himself replaced by Sergio Batista in December of that year.

=== Blooming ===
On 1 June 2005, Quinteros moved back to Bolivia and took over Blooming after the departure of Víctor Hugo Antelo. He led the club to the 2005 Apertura title, but resigned in June 2006, after a mid-table finish in the Clausura.

=== San Martín de San Juan ===
Shortly after leaving Blooming, Quinteros was named manager of San Martín de San Juan on 27 June 2006. On 6 February of the following year, however, he was sacked.

=== Blooming return ===
20 days after leaving San Martín, Quinteros returned to Blooming.

=== Bolívar ===
On 25 December 2008, after previously agreeing to a new one-year contract at Blooming, Quinteros was appointed manager of Bolívar. On 10 November 2009, he left the latter club.

=== Oriente Petrolero ===
On 7 January 2010, Quinteros was presented as manager of Oriente Petrolero. He won the season's Torneo de Invierno, before being announced as manager of the Bolivia national team on 5 November; Oriente still managed to retain Quinteros as manager until the Clausura tournament, also won by the club.

=== Bolivia national team ===
Quinteros officially took over the Bolivia national team on 29 November 2010. Under his guidance, Bolivia failed to win a single match during the entire 2011, but still managed to achieve a draw against Argentina in the 2014 FIFA World Cup qualifiers. On 3 July 2012, he presented his letter of resignation and called a press conference to announce his imminent departure from the national team.

=== Emelec ===
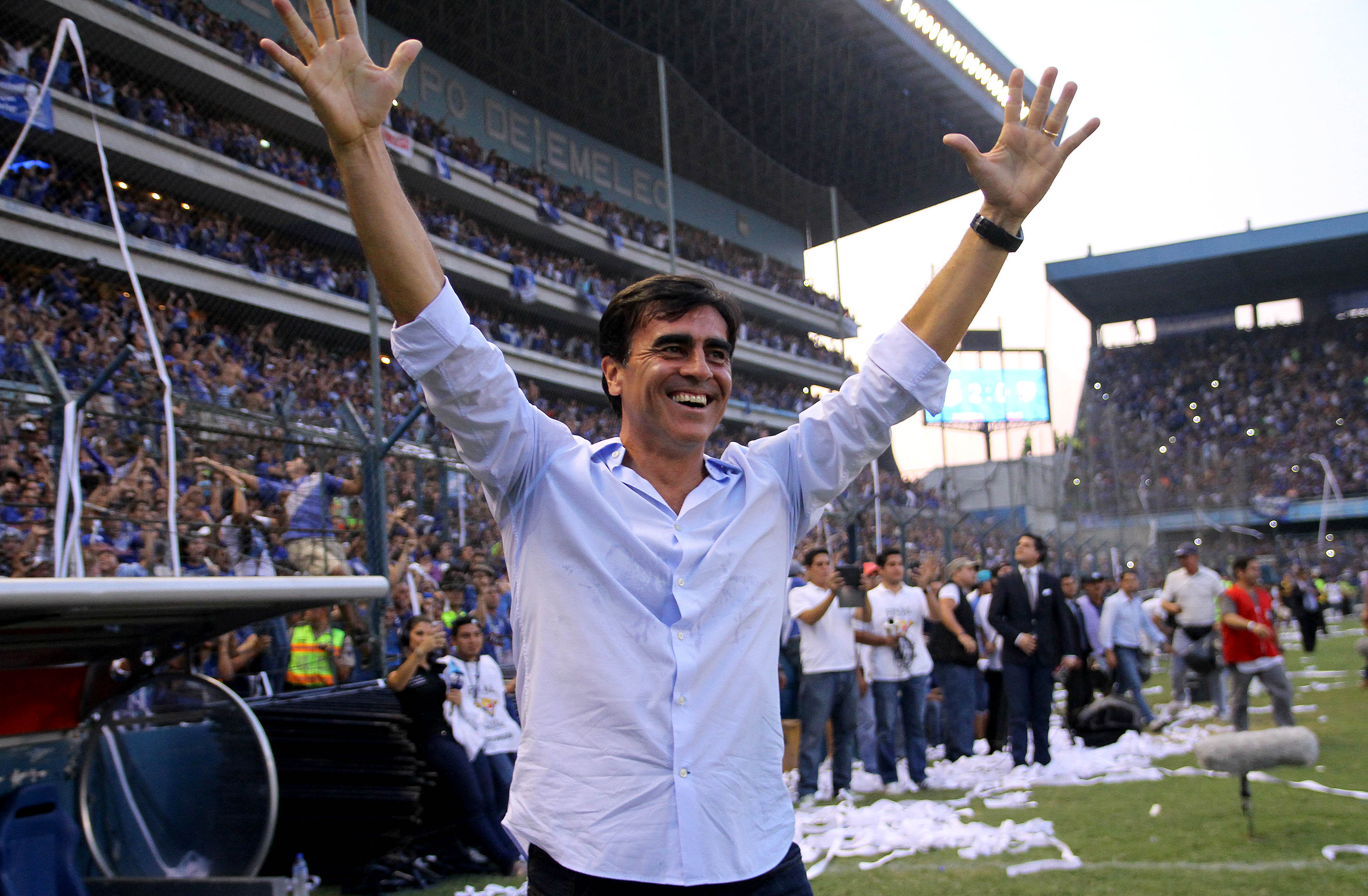
Quinteros with Emelec in 2014

On 9 July 2012, Quinteros was appointed as manager of Ecuadorian club Emelec. He led the club to two consecutive Serie A titles, winning both the Apertura and Clausura in 2013 and defeating Barcelona SC in the finals in 2014.

=== Ecuador national team ===
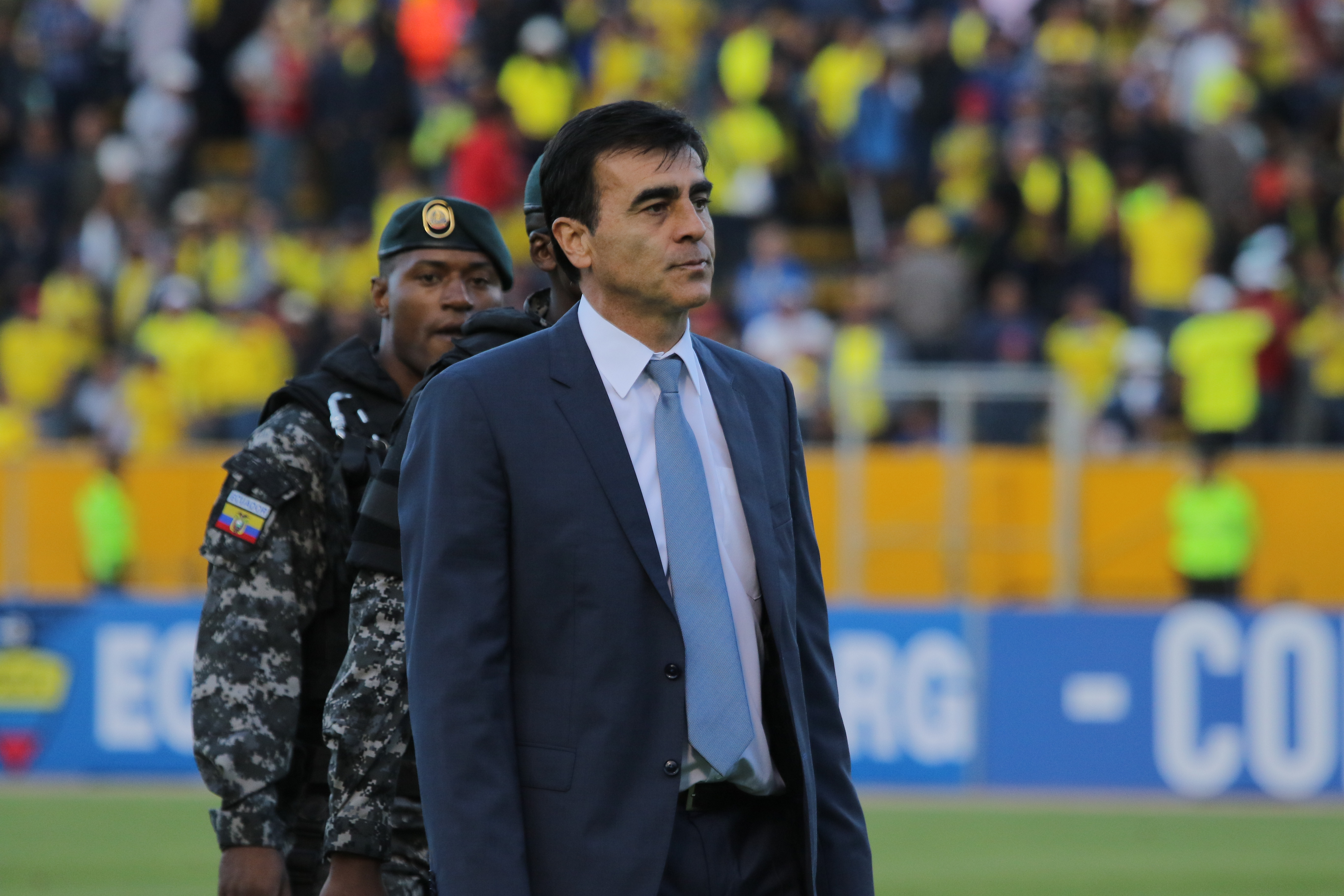
Quinteros managing the Ecuador national team in 2017

On 30 January 2015, Quinteros was announced by the Ecuadorian Football Federation as manager of the national team, but only left Emelec on 15 March.

Quinteros failed to qualify Ecuador to the 2018 FIFA World Cup after a 2–1 loss to Peru on 5 September 2017, and was sacked seven days later.

=== Middle East ===
On 3 October, Quinteros was announced as manager of Al-Nassr in Saudi Arabia, but was dismissed the following 31 January. On 11 May 2018, he switched teams and countries again, after being appointed Al-Wasl manager, being sacked on 19 October.

=== Universidad Católica ===
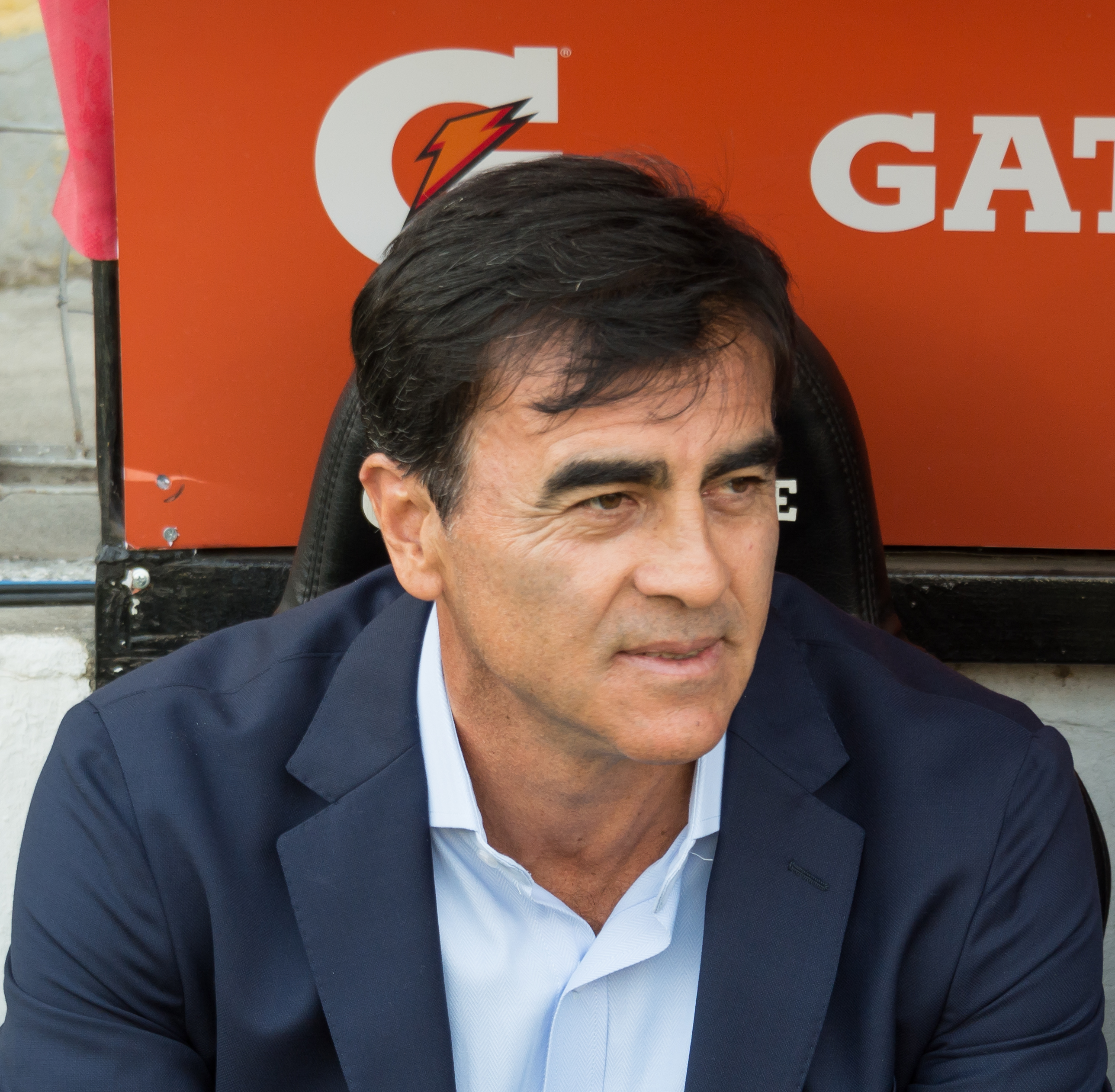
Quinteros in charge of Universidad Católica in 2019

On 21 December 2018, Quinteros moved to Chile after being named at the helm of Universidad Católica on 21 December. He left the Cruzados on 4 December 2019.

=== Tijuana ===
Quinteros was appointed manager of Mexican side Tijuana on 6 December 2019. He resigned from Xolos on 25 June 2020.

=== Colo-Colo ===
Quinteros returned to Chile on 3 October 2020, after being named Colo-Colo manager. He won two Copa Chile titles with the club, aside from the 2022 Supercopa de Chile, but left by mutual consent on 15 December 2023.

=== Vélez Sarsfield ===
On 23 December 2023, Quinteros returned to Argentina after taking over Vélez Sarsfield. He led the club to the 2024 Copa de la Liga Profesional and the 2024 Copa Argentina finals, losing both, but won the 2024 Primera División title; his spell at the club attracted interest from Brazilian clubs Santos and Grêmio.

Quinteros was absent in the 2024 Trofeo de Campeones after attending the wedding of his daughter, being replaced by his assistant Leandro Desábato. On 25 December 2024, he left the club after failing to agree new terms over a new contract.

=== Grêmio ===
On 28 December 2024, Quinteros was announced as head coach of Grêmio on a one-year contract. He oversaw the club lose a Campeonato Gaúcho after seven consecutive titles, and was sacked on 16 April 2025, shortly after a 4–1 loss to Mirassol.

=== Independiente ===
On 19 September 2025, Quinteros returned to Argentina after taking over Independiente.

== Managerial statistics ==
As of match played 12 August 2026

Managerial record by team and tenure
Team	Nat	From	To	Record							
Team	Nat	From	To	G	W	D	L	GF	GA	GD	Win %
Blooming	(Bolivia)	1 June 2005	June 2006	66	35	10	21	114	101	+13	53.03
San Martín de San Juan	(Argentina)	27 June 2006	6 February 2007	40	19	15	6	54	32	+22	47.50
Blooming	(Bolivia)	26 February 2007	25 December 2008	65	30	14	21	107	89	+18	46.15
Bolívar	(Bolivia)	25 December 2008	10 November 2009	40	20	14	6	67	40	+27	50.00
Oriente Petrolero	(Bolivia)	7 January 2010	28 November 2010	57	32	9	16	97	59	+38	56.14
Bolivia	(Bolivia)	1 January 2011	3 July 2012	16	1	6	9	13	26	−13	6.25
Emelec	(Ecuador)	8 July 2012	15 March 2015	156	86	31	39	236	146	+90	55.13
Ecuador	(Ecuador)	16 March 2015	12 September 2017	33	13	6	14	53	42	+11	39.39
Al-Nassr	(Saudi Arabia)	2 October 2017	31 January 2018	14	6	3	5	25	17	+8	42.86
Al-Wasl	(United Arab Emirates)	11 May 2018	19 October 2018	9	2	2	5	9	16	−7	22.22
Universidad Católica	(Chile)	21 December 2018	4 December 2019	39	24	6	9	69	37	+32	61.54
Tijuana	(Mexico)	6 December 2019	12 June 2020	16	7	4	5	22	20	+2	43.75
Colo-Colo	(Chile)	3 October 2020	15 December 2023	154	79	42	33	237	148	+89	51.30
Vélez Sarsfield	(Argentina)	23 December 2023	25 December 2024	51	27	15	9	67	41	+26	52.94
Grêmio	(Brazil)	28 December 2024	16 April 2025	18	8	5	5	33	21	+12	44.44
Independiente	(Argentina)	19 September 2025	13 August 2026	32	14	8	10	43	35	+8	43.75
Total				806	403	190	213	1,246	870	+376	50.00

== Honours ==
=== Player ===
Talleres (RdE)

- Primera B Metropolitana: 1987–88

The Strongest

- Bolivian Primera División: 1989, 1993

San Lorenzo

- Argentine Primera División: 1995 Clausura

=== Manager ===
Blooming

- Bolivian Primera División: 2005 Apertura

Bolívar

- Bolivian Primera División: 2009 Apertura

Oriente Petrolero

- Bolivian Primera División: 2010 Torneo de Invierno, 2010 Clausura

Emelec

- Ecuadorian Serie A: 2013, 2014

Universidad Católica

- Supercopa de Chile: 2019
- Chilean Primera División: 2019

Colo-Colo

- Copa Chile: 2021, 2023
- Supercopa de Chile: 2022
- Chilean Primera División: 2022

Vélez Sarsfield

- Argentine Primera División: 2024
