= Ignacio García =

Ignacio García may refer to:

- Ignacio García Aresca (born 1969), Argentine politician
- Ignacio García Camacho (born 1968), Spanish racing cyclist
- Ignacio García (footballer) (born 1986), Bolivian football defender
- Ignacio García Henríquez (1895–1975), Chilean journalist and politician
- Ignacio García López (1924–2017), Spanish politician
- Ignacio García Malo (1760–1812), Spanish playwright, translator, Hellenist and writer
- Ignacio García Sierpe (fl. 1910s), Chilean politician
- Ignacio García Téllez (1897–1985), Mexican politician, secretary of the interior et al.
- Ignacio García Velilla (born 1967), Spanish film director and screenwriter
- Ignacio M. Garcia, Mexican-American academic
