= Miguel Suárez =

Miguel Suárez may refer to:

- Miguel Suárez (footballer)
- Miguel Suárez (weightlifter)
- Miguel Ángel Suárez, Puerto Rican actor
