= Abel Moralejo =

Argentine footballer and manager

Personal information
- Full name: Abel Rolando Moralejo
- Date of birth: 2 November 1955 (age 70)
- Place of birth: Lincoln, Argentina
- Position: Midfielder

Senior career*
Years	Team	Apps	(Gls)
1974–1975	Racing Club		
1976	Gimnasia La Plata		
1977	Lanús		
1978	Deportivo Roca		
1978–1980	Quilmes		
1980–1984	Vélez Sarsfield		
1984–1986	Instituto		
1986–1987	Blooming		
1987–1988	Chaco For Ever		
1988–1989	Lanús		
1989–1990	Douglas Haig		
1990–1991	Colón		
1991–1992	Almagro		
1992–1993	All Boys		

Managerial career
- 1994–1995: Deportivo Roca
- 1995–1996: Deportivo Quito
- 1996: General Lamadrid
- 1997: Estudiantes BA
- 1997: Deportivo Español (assistant)
- 1998: Excursionistas
- 1998: Provincial Osorno
- 1999: Huracán San Rafael
- 2000: General Belgrano
- 2000: FC Puteolana
- 2001: Alvarado
- 2001: Atlanta
- 2002: Sarmiento Junín
- 2003: Sportivo Luqueño
- 2003: Deportivo Saquisilí
- 2004: LDU Portoviejo
- 2005: Macará
- 2005: Deportivo Heredia
- 2006: Blooming
- 2006–2007: Deportivo Heredia
- 2007–2008: Once Municipal
- 2010: Livorno
- 2010–2011: San Miguel
- 2011–2012: Atlético Policial
- 2013: Berazategui
- 2014: Güemes
- 2015: Leandro N. Alem
- 2024–2025: Huracán San Rafael
- * Club domestic league appearances and goals

Abel Rolando Moralejo (born 2 November 1955) is an Argentine football manager and former player.

== Career ==
Moralejo has worked as a manager in Chile with Provincial Osorno, in Guatemala with Deportivo Heredia, in El Salvador with Once Municipal, in Bolivia win Club Blooming, in Paraguay with Sportivo Luqueño, Ecuadorian teams LDU Portoviejo and Macará and with several clubs in Argentina.

Moralejo led Huracán de San Rafael from August 2024 to January 2025.
