= Alejandro Gómez (Bolivian footballer) =

Bolivian footballer (born 1979)

Personal information
- Full name: Jesús Alejandro Gómez Lanza
- Date of birth: July 18, 1979 (age 47)
- Place of birth: La Paz, Bolivia
- Height: 1.76 m (5 ft 9 in)
- Position: Midfielder

Youth career
- Tahuichi Academy

Senior career*
Years	Team	Apps	(Gls)
1997–2011	Blooming	307	(20)
2005	→ Wilstermann (loan)	27	(1)
2007	→ San José (loan)	39	(3)
2012–2013	Bolívar	26	(2)
2013–2014	Blooming	31	(2)
2014–2016	Sport Boys Warnes	62	(3)
2017	Nacional Potosí	7	(0)

International career
2005–2011	Bolivia	8	(0)
- * Club domestic league appearances and goals as of 3 May 2018

Jesús Alejandro Gómez Lanza (born July 18, 1979), is a Bolivian of Chilean descent footballer who currently plays for Liga de Fútbol Profesional Boliviano club Sport Boys Warnes as a midfielder.

== Club career ==
At club level he spent most of his career with Blooming. He also played for Wilstermann, San José and Bolívar. He is a central midfielder.

In April 2010, he was awarded by the local sports media as the best football player of the year in Bolivia.

== International career ==
Gómez earned 8 caps in the Bolivian national team, 6 of which were FIFA World Cup qualification matches.

== Honours ==
Blooming

- Primera División (2): 1998, 1999
- Torneo de Clausura (1): 2009

San José

- Torneo de Clausura (1): 2007

Bolívar

- Torneo de Clausura (1): 2013
