= Limbert Méndez =

Bolivian footballer (born 1982)

Personal information
- Full name: Limbert Méndez Rocha
- Date of birth: August 18, 1982 (age 44)
- Place of birth: Trinidad, Bolivia
- Height: 1.85 m (6 ft 1 in)
- Position: Defender

Senior career*
| Years | Team | Apps | (Gls) |
| 2000–2008 | Wilstermann | 180 | (5) |
| 2009 | Aurora | 17 | (1) |
| 2010 | Bolívar | 16 | (1) |
| 2011–2012 | Aurora | 40 | (4) |
| 2012–2013 | Blooming | 10 | (1) |
| 2013–2014 | Real Potosí | 28 | (3) |
| 2014–2015 | San José | 1 | (0) |
| 2015–2016 | Universitario de Sucre | 28 | (0) |
| 2016–2018 | Real Potosí | 55 | (3) |

International career
| 2007–2008 | Bolivia | 10 | (0) |
- * Club domestic league appearances and goals as of 23 March 2019

Limbert Méndez Rocha (born August 18, 1982, in Trinidad, Bolivia) is a Bolivian football defender.

== International career ==
He represented his country in 2 FIFA World Cup qualification matches.

== Career statistics ==
=== International ===
Appearances and goals by national team and year
| National team | Year | Apps | Goals |
|---|---|---|---|
| Bolivia | 2007 | 6 | 0 |
| Bolivia | 2008 | 4 | 0 |
| Total | | 10 | 0 |
