= Juan Carlos Sánchez (footballer, born 1956) =

Bolivian footballer (born 1956)

Personal information
- Full name: Juan Carlos Sánchez Frías
- Date of birth: 1 September 1956 (age 70)
- Place of birth: Formosa, Argentina
- Position: Striker

Senior career*
Years	Team	Apps	(Gls)
1977–1978	Gimnasia y Esgrima de Jujuy	?	(?)
1979–1980	Guabirá	64	(43)
1981–1985	Blooming	165	(136)
1986	Wilstermann	36	(22)
1987	Blooming	23	(11)
1988	Litoral	24	(11)
1990	San José	33	(20)
1991	Independiente Petrolero	26	(10)
1992	San José	28	(10)
Total		399	(263)

International career
1985	Bolivia	5	(1)
- * Club domestic league appearances and goals as of June 2007

Juan Carlos Sánchez Frías (born 1 September 1956 in Formosa, Argentina) is a former football striker who played most of his career in the Bolivian League. Born in Argentina, he played five matches for Bolivia national team.

Sánchez started his career with Argentine club Gimnasia y Esgrima de Jujuy in 1972. By 1979, he moved to Bolivia to play for Guabirá, where in 1980 he became the top-scorer in the Bolivian league for the first time by netting 21 goals; his scoring ability bought him a transfer to Blooming, where he spent the best years of his professional career. Playing for Blooming, he scored 136 goals in five seasons, including the league top-scorer in 1981 and 1983.

In 1984, Sánchez helped Blooming win the Bolivian title, and in 1985 he became the Copa Libertadores topscorer with 11 goals, 6 of which came in an 8–0 victory over Deportivo Italia, which set a Copa Libertadores record.

In 1986, he joined Jorge Wilstermann, but then returned to Blooming in 1987.

Sánchez also had a spell with Deportivo Litoral before joining San José in 1990, where he became topscorer in the Bolivian league for the fourth time in his career.

In 1991, he joined Independiente Petrolero, and then returned to San José to retire at the end of the 1992 season. He scored a total of 263 goals during his professional career, becoming the second all-time top-scorer in Bolivian League history.

Moreover, Sánchez played a total of 53 Copa Libertadores games during his career, scoring 26 goals, which puts him in 8th place in the list of all-time scorers for that competition.

== Club titles ==
Season	Club	Title
1984	Blooming	Liga de Fútbol Profesional Boliviano

== Honours ==
Season	Club	Title
1980	Guabirá	Liga de Fútbol Profesional Boliviano top scorer: 21 goals
1981	Blooming	Liga de Fútbol Profesional Boliviano top scorer: 30 goals
1981	Blooming	Topscorer in South American football: 30 goals
1983	Blooming	Liga de Fútbol Profesional Boliviano top scorer: 30 goals
1983	Blooming	Topscorer in South American football: 30 goals
1985	Blooming	Copa Libertadores top scorer 1985: 11 goals
1990	San José	Liga de Fútbol Profesional Boliviano top scorer: 20 goals

== After retirement ==
After retirement Sánchez has gone on to coach and manage several teams, he was a coach at Guabirá, assistant manager at Blooming and he has served as the manager of the Bolivia under-17 and under-20 teams. He currently resides in Montero, Bolivia where he runs his own youth football academy.
