= Cafferatta, Santa Fe =

Cafferata
- Interactive map of Cafferata
- Coordinates: 33°25′0″S 62°10′0″W
- Country: Argentina
- Province: Santa Fe Province
- Department: Caseros Department

Government
  - Type: Communal President
  - President: Joan Stramessi
  - Vicepresident: Margarita Juarez
- Elevation: 107 m (351 ft)
- Time zone: UTC−3 (ART)
- Postal code: S2637
- Area code: +54 3465

Cafferata is a town (comuna) in Santa Fe Province, in General Departamento 10 km (6 mi) from Venado Tuerto.

It is named after Juan Manuel Cafferata, 25th Governor of Santa fe Province.
