= Luis Torrico =

Bolivian footballer (born 1986)

Personal information
- Full name: Luis Anibal Torrico Valverde
- Date of birth: 14 September 1986 (age 40)
- Place of birth: Camiri, Bolivia
- Height: 1.71 m (5 ft 7 in)
- Position: Defender

Team information
- Current team: Nacional Potosí
- Number: 2

Senior career*
| Years | Team | Apps | (Gls) |
| 2005–2010 | Club Bolívar | | |
| 2011–2012 | Club Real Potosí | | |
| 2012–2015 | Club San José | | |
| 2014 | → The Strongest (loan) | | |
| 2015–2019 | Nacional Potosí | | |
| 2020 | Club San José | | |
| 2021– | Nacional Potosí | | |
- * Club domestic league appearances and goals

Luis Torrico (born 14 September 1986) is a Bolivian football defender who plays for Nacional Potosí.
