= Ronny Jiménez =

Bolivian footballer (born 1989)

Personal information
- Full name: Ronny Jiménez Mendonza
- Date of birth: 12 April 1989 (age 37)
- Place of birth: Bolivia
- Height: 1.84 m (6 ft 0 in)
- Position: Right back

Team information
- Current team: Sport Boys Warnes

Senior career*
Years	Team	Apps	(Gls)
2008–2013	Real Potosí	114	(9)
2013–2014	The Strongest	14	(0)
2014–2016	Nacional Potosí	54	(1)
2016–2017	San José	34	(2)
2017	Real Potosí	15	(0)
2018	Aurora	37	(0)
2019–	Sport Boys Warnes		

International career^{‡}
2012–	Bolivia	5	(0)
- * Club domestic league appearances and goals as of 1 April 2013 ‡ National team caps and goals as of 7 April 2013

Ronny Jiménez Mendonza (born 12 April 1989) is a Bolivian footballer playing for Sport Boys Warnes.

== Club career ==
A player for Real Potosí since 2008, he joined the club at the age of 18 years. He has been capped more than 100 times for the Bolivian club. He is also the captain of the club.

== International career ==
He made his debut for Bolivia in a friendly match against Guyana on 16 August 2012 playing the whole 90 minutes starting the match. He is also in the Bolivian squad for the World Cup qualifiers becoming an undisputed starter.
