= Eric Aparicio =

Argentine footballer

Personal information
- Full name: Eric Daniel Aparicio
- Date of birth: 25 January 1990 (age 36)
- Place of birth: Glew, Argentina
- Height: 1.78 m (5 ft 10 in)
- Position: Forward

Youth career
- Lanús

Senior career*
Years	Team	Apps	(Gls)
2009–2011	Lanús	10	(0)
2011	→ Tiro Federal (loan)	12	(2)
2011–2012	Atlanta	15	(2)
2012–2013	Wilstermann	46	(16)
2014	Brown de Adrogué	11	(1)
2014–2015	San Martín SJ	20	(2)
2016	Defensa y Justicia	0	(0)
2016–2017	Brown de Adrogué	3	(0)
2018–2019	Barracas Central		
2020	San Telmo	4	(0)
2020	Chacarita Juniors	0	(0)
2021	Los Andes	7	(1)
- * Club domestic league appearances and goals as of 07:15, 20 August 2022 (UTC)

Eric Daniel Aparicio (born 25 January 1990 in Glew, Buenos Aires) is an Argentine footballer who plays as a striker.
