= Gerardo Yecerotte =

Argentine-bolivian football striker (born 1985)

Personal information
- Full name: Gerardo César Yecerotte Soruco
- Date of birth: August 28, 1985 (age 41)
- Place of birth: Orán, Salta Province, Argentina
- Height: 1.74 m (5 ft 8 1/2 in)
- Position: Forward

Team information
- Current team: Bolivar
- Number: 11

Senior career*
Years	Team	Apps	(Gls)
2006–2012	Real Potosí	162	(35)
2012–	Bolivar	88	(13)

International career^{‡}
2009–2012	Bolivia	4	(1)
- * Club domestic league appearances and goals as of 16 August 2015 ‡ National team caps and goals as of April 28, 2012

Gerardo César Yecerotte Soruco (born August 28, 1985, in Orán, Salta Province) is an Argentine-bolivian football striker that currently plays for Club Bolivar in the Israeli Premier League. He was a naturalized Bolivian because his mother was born in Bolivia. He also has participated in FIFA World Cup qualifiers for 2010.

== Club career ==
Yecerotte began his career with Independiente de Hipólito Yrigoyen, a club of his natal province, with the club, Yecerotte played the Torneo Argentino C during 2004 and 2005.

In 2006, he went to test to Bolivia. After of training with La Paz and not be hired, the coach Félix Berdera, led to Yecerotte to Real Potosí, and he made his debut in the Primera División Boliviana. In 2007, he was proclaimed champion with his club of Torneo Apertura Boliviano 2007, being this his first professional title in his career.

== International career ==
In 2009, he was naturalized bolivian due to his mother was born in Bolivia and he made his debut with the Bolivia national football team for the World Cup qualifiers.

Due to his naturalization, Yecerotte made his debut against Venezuela national football team on 6 June 2009. He scored his first goal for the national team against Ecuador national football team, in a 3–1 home loss in Estadio Hernando Siles.

== International goals ==
Date	Venue	Opponent	Score	Result	Competition
9 September 2009	Estadio Hernando Siles, La Paz, Bolivia	Ecuador	1–3	3–1	FIFA World Cup qualifier
