= Enrique Parada =

Bolivian footballer (born 1981)

Personal information
- Full name: Enrique Parada Salvatierra
- Date of birth: November 4, 1981 (age 45)
- Place of birth: Huacaraje, Bolivia
- Height: 1.68 m (5 ft 6 in)
- Positions: Right back; midfielder

Senior career*
Years	Team	Apps	(Gls)
2002–2009	San José	248	(17)
2010	Club Bolívar	5	(0)
2011–2015	The Strongest	103	(3)
2015–2016	San José	49	(2)

International career
2005–2011	Bolivia	8	(0)
- * Club domestic league appearances and goals as of 7 May 2018

Enrique Parada Salvatierra (born November 4, 1981) is a Bolivian footballer who most recently played for San José.

== International career ==
He earned 8 caps for the Bolivia national football team and represented his country in 4 FIFA World Cup qualification matches.

== Honours ==
Season	Club	Title
2007 (C)	San José	Liga de Fútbol Profesional Boliviano
