= Christian Vargas (Bolivian footballer) =

Bolivian footballer (born 1983)

Personal information
- Full name: Christian Israel Vargas Claros
- Date of birth: 8 September 1983 (age 43)
- Place of birth: Cochabamba, Bolivia
- Height: 1.75 m (5 ft 9 in)
- Position: Right back

Team information
- Current team: Aurora (youth manager)

Senior career*
Years	Team	Apps	(Gls)
2004–2010	Wilstermann	77	(2)
2005–2006	→ San José (loan)	56	(1)
2007	→ The Strongest (loan)	24	(0)
2008	→ Blooming (loan)	29	(0)
2011–2012	San José	27	(0)
2012–2013	Bolívar	21	(0)
2013–2017	Wilstermann	123	(2)
2018–2019	Real Potosí	60	(0)
2020–2021	Aurora	28	(0)

International career
2008–2012	Bolivia	15	(0)

Managerial career
- 2022–: Aurora (youth)
- 2022: Aurora (interim)
- * Club domestic league appearances and goals

Christian Israel Vargas Claros (born 8 September 1983 in Cochabamba) is a Bolivian football manager and former player who played as a right back. He is the currently manager of Aurora's youth sides.

His former clubs include Wilstermann, The Strongest and Blooming.

Vargas has earned 4 caps with the Bolivia national team. He was a member of the squad that participated in the 2011 Copa América.

== Club titles ==
Season	Club	Title
2009 (C)	Blooming	Liga de Fútbol Profesional Boliviano
