= Tobías Albarracín =

Argentine footballer (born 1984)

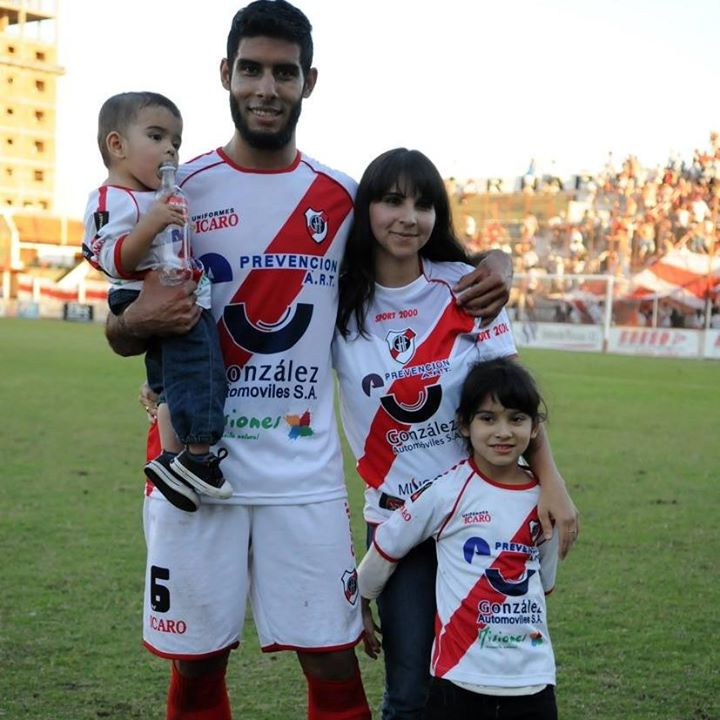

Personal information
- Date of birth: December 5, 1984 (age 41)
- Place of birth: La Rioja, Argentina
- Height: 1.80 m (5 ft 11 in)
- Position: Defender

Senior career*
| Years | Team | Apps | (Gls) |
| 2005–2006 | Independiente de La Rioja | 38 | (1) |
| 2007–2009 | Guaraní Antonio Franco | 59 | (5) |
| 2007–2008 | → Rampla Juniors (loan) | | |
| 2010 | Universitario de Sucre | 35 | (1) |
| 2011–2012 | San José | 31 | (4) |
| 2012–2013 | Bolívar | 34 | (0) |
| 2013–2015 | Guaraní Antonio Franco | 82 | (5) |
| 2016–2017 | Guillermo Brown | 58 | (1) |
| 2017–2018 | Quilmes | 19 | (0) |
| 2018–2019 | Temperley | 10 | (0) |
| 2019–2020 | Estudiantes | 6 | (0) |
| 2021 | Guillermo Brown | 14 | (1) |
| 2021–2022 | Americo Tesorieri | 9 | (0) |
| Total | | 400 | (18) |
Medal record
| Runner-up | Bolivian Primera División | 2012 |
| Winner | Bolivian Primera División | 2013 |
| Winner | Bolivian Primera División | 2014 |
- * Club domestic league appearances and goals

Tobías Albarracín (born December 5, 1984, in La Rioja) is an Argentine footballer who plays for Guarani Antonio Franco in the Primera B Nacional of Argentina.
