= Pastor Tórrez =

Bolivian footballer (born 1990)

Personal information
- Full name: Pastor Buenaventura Tórrez Quiroz
- Date of birth: 27 August 1990 (age 36)
- Place of birth: Cochabamba, Bolivia
- Height: 1.73 m (5 ft 8 in)
- Position: Forward

Senior career*
Years	Team	Apps	(Gls)
2009–2013	Club Real Potosí		
2013–2014	Nacional Potosí		
2014–2015	Universitario de Sucre		
2016	Nacional Potosí		
2016–2017	Club Petrolero		
- * Club domestic league appearances and goals

Pastor Tórrez (born 27 August 1990) is a retired Bolivian football striker.
