= Álex da Rosa =

Footballer (born 1976)

Personal information
- Full name: Álex Rodrigo da Rosa Comelles
- Date of birth: June 1, 1976 (age 50)
- Place of birth: Santiago (RS), Brazil
- Height: 1.72 m (5 ft 8 in)
- Position: Attacking midfielder

Youth career
- Caxias

Senior career*
Years	Team	Apps	(Gls)
1995–1997	Caxias		
1997	São Bento		
1998	Uberlândia EC		
1999	San José		
1999	Oriente Petrolero		
2000	Serrano FC		
2000	MTK Budapest		
2001	Mariscal Braun	38	(20)
2002–2004	The Strongest	86	(27)
2004–2005	Bonner SC	13	(0)
2006	Deportes Tolima	4	(0)
2006	Aurora	11	(1)
2007	Blooming	0	(0)
2007–2009	San José	86	(49)
2010–2011	Bolívar	47	(8)
2012	Nacional Potosí	7	(0)

International career
2004–2010	Bolivia	6	(1)
- * Club domestic league appearances and goals

Álex Rodrigo da Rosa Comelles (born June 1, 1976), best known as Álex da Rosa, is a former professional footballer who played as an attacking midfielder. Born in Brazil, he represented the Bolivia national team at international level.

== Club career ==
Born in Santiago, Brazil, da Rosa began his career at the youth ranks of his hometown club Caxias. He continued playing in Brazil for other lower division clubs such as Esporte Clube São Bento, Uberlândia Esporte Clube and Esporte Clube São José. In 1999 Álex arrived in Bolivia for the first time and signed for big club Oriente Petrolero, however, he did not live up the expectations and left after a couple of months. His next team was Hungarian side MTK Budapest where he played through 2000. Back in Bolivia he joined Mariscal Braun where he had an outstanding season. His performance bought him a transfer to The Strongest in 2002. For the next three years, he maintained a good form and scored several goals for the club, helping The Strongest win two national titles in that period. In 2004, he naturalized Bolivian hoping to get a call and play for the national team.

In 2005, he relocated to Germany to join Bonner SC, before transferring to Colombian team Deportes Tolima the following year. Later, da Rosa moved back to Bolivia to play for Club Aurora. Subsequently, he signed for Blooming, but he was separated from the team shortly after because of indiscipline. Willing to clean his image, da Rosa joined Club San José in early 2007. At his arrival, he became a key player in helping San José obtain the Clausura title. Therefore, he was recognized as the most valuable player by the Bolivian sports media. Now he was the number 1 player in Club Bolívar.

== International career ==
Following his naturalization, da Rosa earned six caps for the Bolivia national team. He scored his first international goal for Bolivia on April 1, 2009, in a memorable victory over Argentina by 6–1 in La Paz.

== Career statistics ==
#	Date	Venue	Opponent	Score	Result	Competition
1	April 1, 2009	Estadio Hernando Siles, La Paz, Bolivia	Argentina	3 – 1	6 - 1	World Cup 2010 Qualifying

== Honours ==
Season	Club	Title
2003 (A)	The Strongest	Liga de Fútbol Profesional Boliviano
2003 (C)	The Strongest	Liga de Fútbol Profesional Boliviano
2007 (C)	San José	Liga de Fútbol Profesional Boliviano
2011 (AD)	Bolívar	Liga de Fútbol Profesional Boliviano
