= Nicolás Raimondi =

Uruguayan footballer (born 1984)

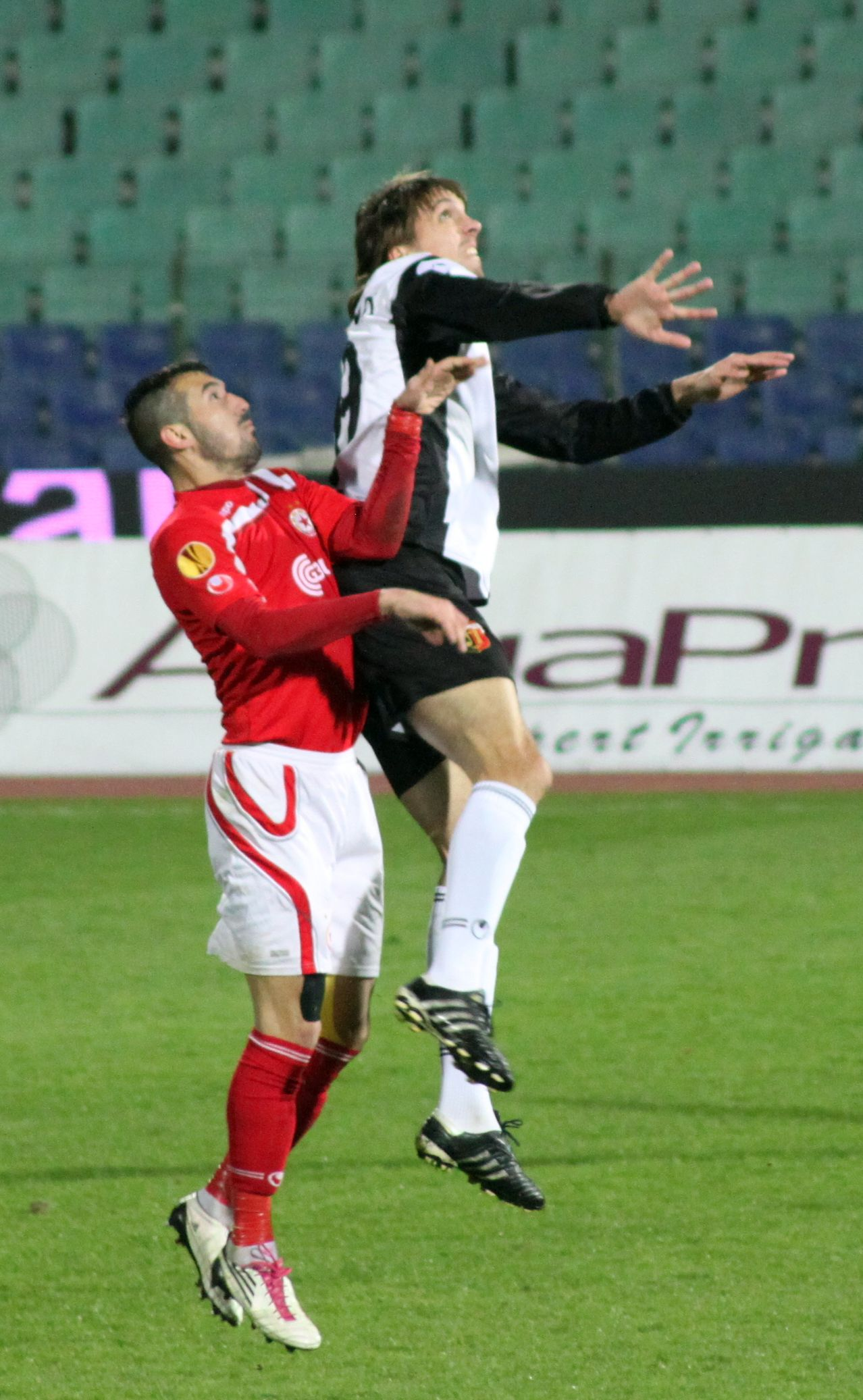
- Raimondi with Lokomotiv Plovdiv in 2010

Personal information
- Full name: Nicolás Raimondi Schiaffarino
- Date of birth: 5 September 1984 (age 42)
- Place of birth: Montevideo, Uruguay
- Height: 1.96 m (6 ft 5 in)
- Position: Striker

Senior career*
Years	Team	Apps	(Gls)
2002–2004	Liverpool Montevideo		(2)
2004	Deportes Antofagasta		
2004	Venezia		
2005	Miramar Misiones	4	(0)
2005	Atlético Universidad		
2006	Liverpool Montevideo		
2007	Grêmio Anápolis		
2008	Avaí		
2008–2009	Universitario de Sucre	11	(8)
2009	Ermis Aradippou	13	(3)
2010	Jorge Wilstermann	28	(7)
2010–2011	Lokomotiv Plovdiv	18	(4)
2012–2013	Cartagena	29	(4)
2014–2015	Rampla Juniors	4	(1)
2015–2016	Torque	20	(9)
2016	Deportivo Maldonado	7	(1)
- * Club domestic league appearances and goals

Nicolás Raimondi Schiaffarino (born 5 September 1984) is a Uruguayan former footballer who played as a striker.

== Career ==
Raimondi began his professional career playing with his hometown team Liverpool Montevideo, a team where he achieve the promotion to the highest division level of Uruguayan football in 2002.

After three seasons with the team of Montevideo he joined the Chilean side Deportes Antofagasta, club which had just gained the promotion to the Chilean Primera División. After half a season, he comes for the first time to play in Europe and he signed with the Italian side F.B.C. Unione Venezia. At the end of the season the team is in financial trouble, is declared bankrupt and relegated from Serie B.

He returned to his homeland and signed a contract with another team from his hometown Miramar Misiones and played in Uruguay's elite division. After several months, he put his first steps at the highest level in Peru at Atlético Universidad, but when that team was relegated at the end of the season, he returned to the team where he started his career, Liverpool Montevideo in the 2005–2006 season. During the 2006–2007 season, he switched to another townsman and contemporary series, Montevideo Wanderers F.C.

At the end of the season he begins his adventure in the Brazilian modest club Grêmio Esportivo Brasil, which he received the first round of the 2007–2008 season and played during the second round at Avaí FC. The subsequent 2008–2009 season he was transferred to the Bolivian side Universitario de Sucre. With this team he stayed two seasons.

For the second time he embarked on a European challenge. This time at the Cyprus side Ermis Aradippou, after which he returned to Bolivia in 2010 at Club Jorge Wilstermann, where he won the 2010 Apertura.

In August 2010, he signed a new deal with the Bulgarian First Division side PFC Lokomotiv Plovdiv. He was released and later transferred to Liga Adelante club Cartagena. During his first appearance for the team he scored against Recreativo de Huelva immediately with the head the second goal of the 3–1 game home win. On 29 May 2012, he was the first player to extend his contract with the club to face the next Segunda División B season.

== Personal life ==
His favourite music artist is said to be X-Factor finalist, Daniel Evans. He is nicknamed the Uruguayan "Pericard" due to very similar playing styles and has a tattoo of Leo Sayer on his right arm. He once swallowed a bee during pre-season training.

== Honours ==
Liverpool

- 2002 Uruguayan Segunda División

Jorge Wilstermann

- 2010 Apertura
