= Pablo Vázquez (footballer, born 1984) =

Argentine footballer

Personal information
- Full name: Pablo Osvaldo Vázquez
- Date of birth: 1 January 1984 (age 42)
- Place of birth: Rosario, Argentina
- Height: 1.87 m (6 ft 2 in)
- Position: Striker

Senior career*
Years	Team	Apps	(Gls)
2002–2004	Argentino (R)	25	(6)
2004	Coronel Bolognesi	10	(0)
2005	Club Atlético Estudiantes	13	(3)
2005–2006	Central Córdoba	28	(12)
2006–2007	Villa Mitre	13	(2)
2007–2008	Newell's Old Boys	6	(0)
2008	Nueva Chicago	14	(7)
2009	The Strongest	35	(20)
2010	FC Timişoara	?	(?)
2010	The Strongest	?	(15)
2011	Quilmes	23	(7)
2012	Deportivo Cuenca	18	(3)
2013	Aldosivi	8	(1)
2013–2014	Gimnasia de Jujuy	5	(0)
2014	CD Olimpia	11	(4)
2014–2015	Real Potosí	20	(8)
2015	LDU Loja	5	(0)
2015	Trikala	3	(0)
2016	Agropecuario Argentino		
- * Club domestic league appearances and goals

Pablo Osvaldo Vázquez (born 1 January 1984 in Rosario) is an Argentinian retired football striker.

== Club career ==
Vázquez began his career in his native Rosario playing for lower division team Argentino. In 2004, he relocated to Peru to play for Coronel Bolognesi. The following year he returned to Argentina to and join Club Atlético Estudiantes from Buenos Aires, then he played for Central Córdoba and later he did for Villa Mitre. In 2007, he finally played in the Argentine first division with his hometown club Newell's. After a year with the leprosos, he transferred to Nueva Chicago where he played until the end of the 2008 calendar.

In 2009, he emigrated to Bolivia and joined The Strongest by request of team manager and fellow countryman Julio César Toresani.

=== Poli Timişoara ===
- The goalscorer of Liga de Fútbol Profesional Boliviano signed a 1-year loan agreement with FC Timişoara.
- He didn't adapt to the life in Romania and returned to his Club Strongest.
