= Ignacio García (footballer) =

Bolivian footballer (born 1986)

Personal information
- Full name: Ignacio Awad García Justiniano
- Date of birth: August 20, 1986 (age 40)
- Place of birth: Santa Cruz de la Sierra, Bolivia
- Height: 1.78 m (5 ft 10 in)
- Position: Defender

Team information
- Current team: Real Potosí
- Number: 22

Youth career
- Tahuichi Academy

Senior career*
Years	Team	Apps	(Gls)
2004–2005	Bolívar	30	(0)
2006	→ Blooming (loan)	10	(0)
2007–2009	Bolívar	89	(6)
2010–2011	Aurora	30	(9)
2011–2012	Blooming	26	(0)
2012–2013	San José	41	(4)
2013–2014	Wilstermann	27	(4)
2014–2016	Nacional Potosí	78	(10)
2016–2017	Oriente Petrolero	30	(2)
2017–2018	San José	15	(0)
2019–	Real Potosí	4	(0)

International career
2008–	Bolivia	11	(0)
- * Club domestic league appearances and goals as of 31 March 2019

Ignacio Awad García Justiniano (born August 20, 1986) is a Bolivian football defender who currently plays for Real Potosí.

== Club career ==
Born in Santa Cruz de la Sierra, Ignacio is the younger brother of Aris Thessaloniki F.C. and the Bolivia national team midfielder Ronald "Nacho" García.

The Tahuichi Academy is where he developed his football skills as a youngster. Then in 2004, he reached professional level with club Bolívar where he played for a couple of seasons, mainly as a substitute. In 2006, he was loaned to Blooming, but he didn't get much playing time, so he returned to Bolívar the following year. During his second spell with la academia, he began to show more confidence and his playing capacity improved considerably; earning a spot in the starting line-up indisputably. In 2011, he was signed by Blooming for the second time in his career.

== International career ==
Since 2008, García has earned 11 caps with the Bolivia national team. He represented his country in 7 FIFA World Cup qualification matches.

== Honours ==
Season	Club	Title
2004 (A)	Bolívar	Liga de Fútbol Profesional Boliviano
2005 (AD)	Bolívar	Liga de Fútbol Profesional Boliviano
2009 (A)	Bolívar	Liga de Fútbol Profesional Boliviano
