= Leandro Maygua =

Bolivian footballer (born 1992)

Personal information
- Full name: Leandro Marcelo Maygua Ríos
- Date of birth: 12 September 1992 (age 34)
- Place of birth: Tarija, Bolivia
- Height: 1.75 m (5 ft 9 in)
- Position: Midfielder

Team information
- Current team: Universitario de Sucre
- Number: 5

Youth career
- –2012: Bolívar

Senior career*
Years	Team	Apps	(Gls)
2012–2018	Bolívar	85	(5)
2018–	Universitario de Sucre	6	(0)

International career^{‡}
2013–	Bolivia	4	(0)
- * Club domestic league appearances and goals as of 12 June 2016 ‡ National team caps and goals as of 12 June 2016

Leandro Marcelo Maygua Ríos (born 12 September 1992) is a Bolivian footballer who plays as a midfielder for Universitario de Sucre.

== International career ==
Maygua made his debut for Bolivia in a September 2013 FIFA World Cup qualification match against Paraguay.
