= Juan Gabriel Valverde =

Bolivian footballer (born 1990)

Gabriel Valverde
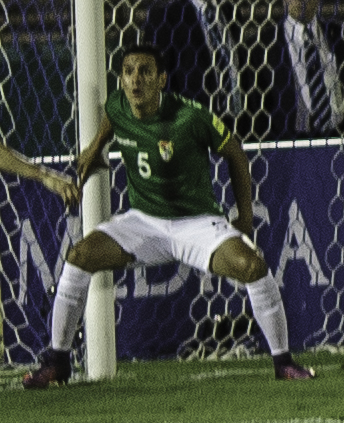

Personal information
- Full name: Juan Gabriel Valverde
- Date of birth: 24 June 1990 (age 36)
- Place of birth: Santa Cruz de la Sierra, Bolivia
- Height: 1.78 m (5 ft 10 in)
- Position: Defender

Team information
- Current team: Blooming
- Number: 3

Senior career*
Years	Team	Apps	(Gls)
2008–2013	Bolívar	84	(1)
2014	Blooming	10	(1)
2014–2015	San José	31	(3)
2015–2016	Bolívar	12	(0)
2017–2022	The Strongest	77	(7)
2023–	Blooming	46	(3)

International career^{‡}
2012–	Bolivia	17	(0)
- * Club domestic league appearances and goals as of 30 December 2025 ‡ National team caps and goals as of 26 January 2022

Juan Gabriel Valverde Ribera (born June 24, 1990, in Santa Cruz de la Sierra), known as Gabriel Valverde or simply Valverde, is a Bolivian footballer who plays for Club Blooming as defender in the Bolivian Primera División.

== Career statistics ==
As of 6 March 2017

Club	Season	League			Cup		Conmebol		Other		Total	
Club	Season	Division	Apps	Goals	Apps	Goals	Apps	Goals	Apps	Goals	Apps	Goals
Bolívar	2010	Boliviano	10	1	—		—		—		10	1
Bolívar	2011	Boliviano	6	0	—		0	0	—		6	0
Bolívar	2011–12	Boliviano	26	0	—		8	0	—		34	0
Bolívar	2012–13	Boliviano	23	0	—		1	0	—		24	0
Bolívar	2012–13	Boliviano	0	0	—		—		—		0	0
Bolívar	Subtotal		65	1	—		9	0	—		74	1
Blooming	2012–13	Boliviano	10	1	—		—		—		10	1
San José	2014–15	Boliviano	31	3	—		5	1	—		36	4
Bolívar	2015–16	Boliviano	12	0	—		2	0	—		14	0
The Strongest	2016–17	Boliviano	17	3	—		0	0	—		17	3
Career total			135	8	0	0	16	1	—		151	9
