= Charles da Silva =

Brazilian footballer (born 1984)

Personal information
- Full name: Werther Thiers Charles da Silva
- Date of birth: 11 March 1984 (age 42)
- Place of birth: São Paulo, Brazil
- Height: 1.65 m (5 ft 5 in)
- Position: Midfielder

Senior career*
Years	Team	Apps	(Gls)
2006	São Bento		
2007	2 de Mayo		
2007	Sportivo Trinidense		
2008	Sportivo Luqueño		
2009–2010	Bolívar		
2010–2011	Al Raed		
2012	Pelotas		
2012	Guaratinguetá		
2012–2014	Aurora		
2014–2015	Nacional Potosí		
2015	Ermis Aradippou		
2016	San José		
2016–2019	Aurora		

Managerial career
- Sep–Dec 2019: Club Aurora
- * Club domestic league appearances and goals

Werther Thiers Charles da Silva, also known as Charles (born 11 March 1984) is a Brazilian football midfielder who plays for Club Aurora.
