= Ronald Gallegos =

Bolivian footballer (born 1982)

Personal information
- Full name: Jesús Ronald Gallegos Vera
- Date of birth: 6 September 1982 (age 44)
- Place of birth: Cochabamba, Bolivia
- Height: 1.72 m (5 ft 8 in)
- Position: Midfielder

Senior career*
Years	Team	Apps	(Gls)
2004–2007	Universitario de Sucre		
2008	Club Real Potosí		
2009–2013	Universitario de Sucre		
2013–2014	Club Aurora		
2014–2015	Club Petrolero		
2015–2016	Nacional Potosí		
2006–2017	Club Real Potosí		
2017–2019	Nacional Potosí		
- * Club domestic league appearances and goals

Ronald Gallegos (born 6 September 1982) is a retired Bolivian football midfielder.
