= Anderson Gonzaga =

Brazilian footballer (born 1983)

Personal information
- Full name: Anderson Aparecido Gonzaga Martíns
- Date of birth: 29 December 1983 (age 42)
- Place of birth: Porto Feliz, Brazil
- Height: 1.83 m (6 ft 0 in)
- Positions: Forward; midfielder

Team information
- Current team: CD Torre Fuerte

Senior career*
Years	Team	Apps	(Gls)
2006–2007	Portuguesa	11	(1)
2007	Destroyers	10	(2)
2008	Blooming	25	(16)
2008–2009	Panionios	18	(4)
2009–2010	Bolívar	30	(12)
2010–2011	Danubio	23	(7)
2011	Albirex Niigata	11	(1)
2012	Fagiano Okayama	23	(0)
2013	FC Machida Zelvia	16	(2)
2014–2016	Sport Boys	79	(14)
2016–2017	Real América		
2017–2018	Royal Pari	13	(3)
2018–	CD Torre Fuerte		
2022	→ Atletico Warnes (loan)		
- * Club domestic league appearances and goals as of 26 May 2018

Anderson Aparecido Gonzaga Martíns (born 29 December 1983) is a Brazilian footballer who plays for Bolivian club CD Torre Fuerte.

== Career ==
In 2007, he arrived in Santa Cruz to play for Club Destroyers. The following year after having a fairly good season with the canarios, he signed for Blooming, where he exceeded the expectations and finished as the topscorer in the Apertura tournament with 16 goals. He also scored two goals against Paraguayan club Olimpia in the preliminary stage of Copa Sudamericana 2008.

In August 2008, Gonzaga was transferred to Super League Greece club Panionios F.C. After an unsuccessful stint in Europe, he returned to Bolivia and signed a one-year deal with Bolívar in August 2009.

In July 2010 he signed for Uruguayan club Danubio, where he played alongside Álvaro Recoba, who was also his teammate in Panionios F.C.

In July 2011 he joined Albirex Niigata in the J1 League on a two-year contract. Unable to secure a spot in the first team, Gonzaga was loaned to Japanese lower division clubs Fagiano Okayama in 2012 and FC Machida Zelvia in 2013. After his contract expired with Niigata, he returned to Bolivia and signed for Sport Boys Warnes in January 2014.

== Honours ==
Season	Club	Title
2008 (A)	Blooming	Liga de Fútbol Profesional Boliviano topscorer: 16 goals
