= Miguel Suárez (footballer) =

Bolivian footballer (born 1993)

Personal information
- Full name: Miguel Gerardo Suárez Savino
- Date of birth: 1 June 1993 (age 33)
- Place of birth: Tarija, Bolivia
- Height: 1.75 m (5 ft 9 in)
- Position: Forward

Team information
- Current team: Independiente Petrolero
- Number: 7

Youth career
- –2011: Bolívar

Senior career*
Years	Team	Apps	(Gls)
2011–2017	Bolívar	55	(4)
2015	→ Universitario (loan)	9	(1)
2015–2017	→ Wilstermann (loan)	44	(3)
2017–2019	San José	38	(6)
2019	Always Ready	12	(1)
2020	Nacional Potosí	13	(1)
2021–	Independiente Petrolero	3	(0)

International career^{‡}
2012–	Bolivia	3	(1)
- * Club domestic league appearances and goals as of 16:55, 30 May 2021 (UTC) ‡ National team caps and goals as of 18 July 2014

Miguel Suárez (born 1 June 1993) is a Bolivian footballer who plays as a forward for Independiente Petrolero.
