= Club Blooming =

Association football club in Bolivia

Blooming
- Full name: Club Social, Cultural y Deportivo Blooming
- Nicknames: La Academia Cruceña; Celestes
- Founded: 1 May 1946; 80 years ago
- Ground: Estadio Ramón Tahuichi Aguilera
- Capacity: 38,000
- Chairman: Sebastián Peña
- Manager: Mauricio Soria
- League: División Profesional
- 2025: División Profesional, 5th of 16
- Website: clubblooming.bo
Home colours	Away colours

Club Social, Cultural y Deportivo de Blooming, commonly known as Blooming, is a Bolivian professional football club from Santa Cruz de la Sierra that currently plays in the Bolivian Primera División.

Founded in 1946, its home colours are sky blue, white and navy. They play at the Estadio Ramón Tahuichi Aguilera (38,000 seats). Its main rival is Oriente Petrolero, also from Santa Cruz. When they face each other in the local derby also known as Clásico Cruceño, it is considered one of the most important matches in Bolivian football due to the fanaticism and passion of its fans, as well as the intensity of the match itself.

== History ==
=== 1946 to 1970s ===
On 1 May 1946, a group of young men, led by Humberto Vaca Pereyra Montaño, agreed to establish a new football club after the rupture of a previous team they had put together called "Blue Sky". In their quest to find a name, they looked for inspiration in the city of Santa Cruz's flourishing youth; therefore, they decided to name the team officially as "Club Blooming". In the years following its foundation, Blooming became a very successful club in the amateur league, winning several regional tournaments. By 1953, the board of directors determined that it was time to enhance the club's status.

Hence, Blooming made the transition from amateur to professional football after defeating two other local teams in a short tournament. From that moment, the team earned the right to be a member of the Asociación Cruceña de Fútbol (ACF), a regional association that happened to be the highest football entity in the Santa Cruz department during that time.

In 1977, the Liga de Fútbol Profesional Boliviano was born. The league comprised sixteen traditional clubs from all across the country, among them Blooming. At the time, the club appointed a new chairman, Roberto "Tito" Paz, a well-known and respected businessman from Santa Cruz who would transform the team into a true powerhouse in the following years. Blooming's first official match in the league was played on 17 September 1977 in a 3–1 victory over Real Santa Cruz.

=== 1980s ===
After playing in first division for a few seasons, Blooming managed to solidify a team that became one of the finest in Bolivian football during the early 1980s.

The manager at that time was Chilean native Raúl "El Mago" Pino. Under his direction, he had a group of talented players including Silvio Rojas, Juan Carlos Sánchez, Milton Melgar, Roly Paniagua, Rolando Coimbra, and Miguel Ángel Noro, among others. They all became great contributors in helping the club make history by finishing as runners-up in 1982 and 1983, and winning the first national championship in 1984, thanks to a long range shot by Milton Melgar in injury time against Bolívar in Cochabamba.

Consequently, Blooming participated in the 1985 edition of Copa Libertadores in Group B against Venezuelan clubs Deportivo Táchira and Deportivo Italia, as well as rivals Oriente Petrolero. That year, Juan Carlos Sánchez wrote his name in the book of records of that prestigious tournament. During a home game against Deportivo Italia from Venezuela, which Blooming won 8–0, he scored six goals alone, and set a personal record unlikely to be broken. The team had an impressive run and advanced to the semi-finals stage undefeated, with five wins and one draw. However, the dream of winning the most desired trophy in the continent vanished after finishing last in a group series against Argentine clubs Independiente and Argentinos Juniors, the latter claiming the title that year. That was Blooming's best performance in a CONMEBOL competition to date. The rest of the decade was a period characterized by regular seasons.

=== 1990s ===
Entering this decade, Blooming regained that winning spirit that got lost towards the end of the 1980s. A new generation of players including Jaime Moreno, Juan Manuel Peña, and Berthy Suárez placed the club back among the elite in Bolivian football. In both seasons, 1990 and 1991, the team came close from winning the national championship by reaching semi-finals with Ramiro Blacut as the manager; nonetheless, the academia cruceña lost to Bolívar and San José respectively. In 1994 the team started the tournament strong. On 19 January of that year, Blooming defeated its biggest rival Oriente Petrolero by the largest margin in the derby's history.

It was an unforgettable 5–0 victory with goals scored by Hebert Arandia (2), Jaime Moreno (2) and Juan Carlos Chávez. However, the game wasn't completed because Oriente's supporters invaded the field in protest on the 75th minute and the game was suspended. It resumed and was completed the next day behind closed doors. After such a colossal victory, Blooming stayed motivated throughout the season obtaining good results and making the play-offs, but ultimately they finished in third place behind La Paz's clubs The Strongest and Bolívar, and missed another opportunity to take part in an international tournament.

During the second semester of 1994, Blooming began experiencing difficult times financially. The condition had severe implications in the players as they went on strike in several occasions. The evident lack of motivation was soon reflected on the field, as the team didn't qualify to any of the two championship play-offs, and to make things worse, it compromised its permanence in first division football due to poor performances throughout the season. Entering 1995 the financial crisis exacerbated. Blooming no longer had the capacity to pay its players. Tired of this situation, most of them left the institution and signed for other teams. Clearly the club had no other alternative, but to turn to its youth sector as the last resort to compete in the local tournament. Despite the tremendous effort exhibited by these youngsters, the team finished second-bottom of the league having to play a relegation series with the Copa Simón Bolívar's runners-up. On November of that year in La Paz, Blooming lost to Chaco Petrolero 6–5 on penalty kicks, after a 1–1 score during regular time. Hence, the team was relegated for the first time since the league was founded in 1977.

The following year Blooming celebrated its 50th anniversary playing in second division; however, a new board of directors with Juan Callaú in command, promised the supporters that the team would return to first division in 1997. The first step was to find a manager with a strong background, who was familiar with Bolivian football and had the willingness to undertake this project. That's how they determined to bring onboard Carlos Aragonés, a prominent manager who had won the national title with The Strongest a few years back. The club was also strengthened with off-season acquisitions like midfielder Limberg Gutiérrez, striker Víctor Hugo Antelo, Tahuichi right-back Renny Ribera and other players, which got on well with rest of the squad; forming a team that won the promotion in 1996 by defeating Club Universidad from Santa Cruz in the Copa Simón Bolívar finals.

With the imminent return of Blooming to first division football, the club once again occupied a seat of honor among the best teams in Bolivia. In 1997, la academia made a successful comeback; in the Apertura the club finished first in its group; nevertheless it fell short from winning the title by getting knocked-out in semi-finals by Bolívar. In the Clausura Blooming qualified as second best in its group, but in the "Hexagonal Final" the team ended up third behind Bolívar and Oriente; therefore, being left out of another Copa Libertadores berth. The following year and after leaving all the frustrations behind, Blooming resumed its protagonism in the league. With the basis of that group of players, along with the arrival of other key figures such as Bolivian internationals Rubén Tufiño and José Carlos Fernández, Blooming consolidated a squad that led the tournament from the beginning and culminated with the 1998 Clausura title. Later in the year they defeated Wistermann in the championship finals by scores of 3–0 at home and 1–0 as visitors.

The city of Santa Cruz turned into a carnival parade in mid December. The fans were exceedingly cheerful and euphoric to see their team win the first national championship in fourteen years. Luckily for them, the reason to celebrate a new championship didn't drag on. The following year, Blooming won the 1999 Apertura with seven points ahead of the second-placed team, Bolívar. Later, they faced the Clausura winners to determine the champions of 1999. Blooming dominated the series over The Strongest by a similar scores of 3–2 on both games, and retained the trophy for another year, with Carlos Aragonés as coach.

As an important fact, Blooming is the first team from Santa Cruz to win the title in consecutive seasons.

The 1998 title meant Blooming returned to the Copa Libertadores for the first time in 14 years, for the 1999 edition. However, they came last in their group.

=== 2000–present ===
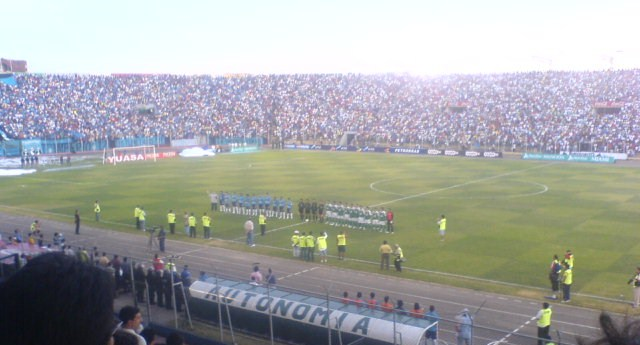
Picture of the derby vs Oriente Petrolero.

In 2001, Blooming began renovating its squad since some of the talented players that took part in the back-to-back championship run left the institution. As a result, in the following years Blooming had modest participations in the league, maintaining a low profile and lacking ambition.

Finally in the 2005 Apertura, Blooming gave its fans a new reason to celebrate when they won the tournament with a young and rejuvenated team under the guidance of Gustavo Quinteros. Blooming secured the title on 8 December, in the last game with a 3–2 away victory over The Strongest. Thus, the team finished first in the final group stage or "final six" with five points ahead of Bolívar. Players such as Joselito Vaca, Gualberto Mojica, Lisandro Sacripanti and Pedro Higa were fundamental in enlightening the road towards the title.

The following year, the victorious path extended for Blooming as the team obtained the 2006 Copa Aerosur. After a prosperous run with Blooming, Quinteros left the club to manage a first division team in Argentina. His absence was deeply felt as the team experienced a downfall shortly after his departure. Managers Abel Moralejo and later Álvaro Peña managed the club unsuccessfully during this period. In March 2007 Gustavo Quinteros returned to the institution to turn things around. There was an evident improvement and that team effort was rewarded with a spot in the Copa Sudamericana the following year, in 2008, where it was eliminated in the preliminary round in the club's first ever Copa Sudamericana participation. Blooming began the 2008 season on a positive note. For the second time in its history the team won the Copa Aerosur. This was achieved in part due to an outstanding performance displayed by club legend Hernán Boyero, who finished as the top scorer in that short tournament with 8 goals; however, the team wasn't able to match the same success once the Apertura tournament commenced, and finished with a disappointing six place, despite having a competitive team including Anderson Gonzaga, the tournament's top scorer with 16.

When the Clausura kicked off, the team showed a considerable improvement and built up its confidence again. As a result, Blooming qualified to the championship play-offs as the number one seed in its group. In semi-finals the club faced La Paz. In the first-leg, Blooming encountered a solid and fierce home team, and was defeated 1–2 in the always imposing and tough Estadio Hernando Siles. Nevertheless, the players got their revenge and humiliated La Paz by a 5–0 score in the rematch played in Santa Cruz, making their way to the finals. Subsequently, they faced Aurora for the 2008 Clausura title. Each team prevailed in their respective home games without a goal differential rule established, so in order to crown a new champion a third and decisive match was scheduled in Sucre. The game was played under harsh weather conditions, with the final score at 2–2 during regulation time. However, the penalty kicks favored Aurora (4–2) and Blooming had to settle as runners-up.

The 2009 Clausura marked the consecration of the fifth title in Blooming's history. After qualifying third in its group, Blooming was matched up with Real Potosí in quarter-finals. The celestes managed to eliminate its opponent after a 0–0 draw in their visit to the Estadio Victor Agustín Ugarte in Potosí (4,000 m above sea level) and a crucial 1–0 victory at home. In semi-finals they faced their fierce and eternal rival Oriente Petrolero. In the first-leg match Blooming lost 2–3, but in the second-leg the team overcame the deficit and won 1–0 with a goal by Damián Akerman. Since the knock-out stage was subject to the away goals rule (3–3 aggregate score), Blooming advanced to the finals. This time the team on the other end was Bolívar. The first match was a struggle for Blooming, but came victorious on its ground by a 1–0 score. In the second-leg match played in La Paz the team felt the pressure exerted by the locals on and off the field; however, Blooming gave the first thrust thanks to a brilliant goal netted by Roger Suárez. Ultimately, Bolívar tied the game but the score (1–1) remained untouched through the end of regulation time, and Blooming were the champions. The 2009 title gave them a spot in the 2009 Copa Sudamericana, where they were eliminated in the first round by River Plate.

Blooming qualified for Copa Sudamericana in 2012 and 2013, where they were eliminated in the first stage both times. In 2016, the club managed to get past the first stage by beating Plaza Colonia from Uruguay, and then lost to eventual finalists Atlético Nacional from Colombia in the next stage.

== Honours ==
=== National ===
- Bolivian Primera División
  - Winners (5): 1984, 1998, 1999, 2005-A, 2009-C
- Bolivian Second Division
  - Winners (1): 1996

=== Regional ===
- Campeonato Cruceño
  - Winners (7): 1954, 1955, 1958, 1960, 1963, 1968, 1996

== Performance in CONMEBOL competitions ==
- Copa Libertadores: 7 appearances

Best: Semi-finals in 1985
1983 – First Round
1984 – First Round
1985 – Semi-finals
1999 – First Round
2000 – First Round
2007 – Preliminary Round
2010 – First Round

- Copa Sudamericana: 4 appearances

Best: Second Round in 2016
2008 – Preliminary Round
2009 – First Round
2012 – First Round
2013 – First Round
2016 – Second Round

- Recopa Sudamericana: 0 appearances

- Copa Merconorte: 1 appearance

2001 – Group stage

== Current squad ==
As of 14 March, 2026

Note: Flags indicate national team as defined under FIFA eligibility rules; some limited exceptions apply. Players may hold more than one non-FIFA nationality.

No.	Pos.	Nation	Player
1	GK	BOL	Braulio Uraezaña
2	DF	BOL	Mauricio Cabral
3	DF	BOL	Gabriel Valverde
4	MF	BOL	Denilson Durán
5	DF	BOL	Saúl Severiche
6	MF	BOL	Richard Spenhay
7	FW	BOL	Miguel Villarroel
8	MF	BOL	Moisés Villarroel (captain)
9	FW	COL	Antony Vásquez
10	MF	COL	Roberto Hinojoza
11	FW	BOL	César Menacho
12	GK	BOL	Carlos Jiménez
14	MF	BOL	Juan Mercado
16	MF	BOL	Danny Bejarano
17	DF	ARG	Diago Giménez

No.	Pos.	Nation	Player
18	MF	BOL	Juan Gonzáles
19	MF	URU	Matías Abisab
20	FW	BOL	Percy Loza
22	DF	ARG	Julio Vila
23	FW	BOL	Jeyson Chura
24	DF	BOL	Eduardo Justiniano
27	FW	BOL	Luis Chávez
28	DF	BOL	Eduardo Álvarez
29	FW	COL	Bayron Garcés
33	MF	COL	Auli Oliveros
40	FW	BOL	Giovanni Cadore
44	DF	BOL	Marc Enoumba
55	DF	BOL	José María Carrasco
70	DF	BOL	Esdras Mendoza
71	GK	BOL	Gustavo Almada
88	MF	BOL	Guilmar Centella

== Notable former players ==
See also Category:Club Blooming players.

=== Former Managers ===
Club Blooming's Managerial History from 1978 to Present
(Bolivia) Ruben Saldaña Barba (†) (1978–79), (1980–81); (Bolivia) Ramiro Blacut (†) (1981–82); (Chile) Raúl "El Mago" Pino (†) (1983–85); (Argentina) Humberto Maschio (†) (1985); (Bolivia) Ramiro Blacut (†) (1986–87); (Chile) Raúl "El Mago" Pino (†) (1989); (Bolivia) Carlos Aragonés (1989–90); (Bolivia) Ramiro Blacut (†) (1990–91); (Argentina) Carlos Biasutto (1992–93), (1994), (1995); (Serbia) Ivan Brzić (†) (1994); (Chile) Raúl "El Mago" Pino (†) (1995); (Bolivia) Ovidio Messa (†) (1996); (Uruguay) Wálter "Cata" Roque (†) (1996–97); (Bolivia) Victor Barrientos (1997); (Argentina) Salvador Ragusa (1998); (Bolivia) Carlos Aragonés (1998–00); (Argentina) Carlos Ramacciotti (1 July 2000 – 31 December 2000); (Bolivia) Milton Melgar (2000); (Argentina) Mario Kempes (2 October 2000 – 17 December 2000); (Bolivia) Luís Orozco (2001); (Spain) Manolo Nuñez (2001–02); (Argentina) José Luis "Tata" Brown (†) (17 July 2002 – 25 October 2002); (Bolivia) Víctor Hugo Antelo (2002–03); (Bolivia) Carlos Aragonés (2003); (Bolivia) Esteban Galarza (†) (2004); (Brazil) José Luis Carbone (†) (2004–05); (Bolivia) Gustavo Quinteros (2005–06); (Argentina) Abel Moralejo (2006)	(Bolivia) Álvaro Peña (2006–07); (Bolivia) Gustavo Quinteros (2007–08); (Uruguay) Pablo Repetto (25 February 2009 – 18 June 2009); (Argentina) Víctor Hugo Andrada (July, 1 2009– 19 March 2010); (Bolivia) Carlos Aragonés (20 March 2010– 1 March 2011); (Argentina) Fernando "Teté" Quiroz (2 March 2011 – 8 September 2011); (Argentina) Edgardo Malvestiti (9 September 2011 – 5 March 2012); (Argentina) Néstor Clausen (8 March 2012 – 30 June 2013); (Argentina) Víctor Hugo Andrada (14 June 2013 – 30 August 2013); (Uruguay) Gustavo "Chavo" Díaz (1 September 2013 – 6 April 2014); (Bolivia) Mauricio Soria (8 April 2014 – 20 December 2014); (Bolivia) Erwin "Platini" Sánchez (7 January 2015– 1 December 2015); (Argentina) Hernán Boyero (9 December 2015 – 30 May 2016); (Bolivia) Mauricio Soria (31 May 2016 – 3 November 2016); (Argentina) Ricardo Lunari (7 January 2017 – 17 May 2017); (Costa Rica) Jeaustin Campos (29 May 2017 – 6 March 2018); (Bolivia) Erwin "Platini" Sánchez (9 March 2018 – 31 December 2019); (Chile) Miguel Ponce (1 January 2020 - 13 October 2020); (Argentina) Gabriel Schürrer (22 October 2020 – 4 January 2021); (Bolivia) Eduardo Villegas (6 January 2021 – 20 August 2021); (Argentina) Hernán Meske (21 August 2021 – 28 November 2021); (Chile) Rodrigo Venegas (29 November 2021 - 10 August 2022); (Argentina) Néstor Clausen (11 August 2022 – 23 August 2022); (Bolivia) Víctor Hugo Antelo (24 August 2022 – 31 December 2022); (Brazil) Thiago Leitao (1 January 2023 - 19 February 2023); (Argentina) Carlos Bustos (21 February 2023 – 8 November 2024); (Bolivia) Álvaro Peña (9 November 2024 - 25 December 2024); (Bolivia) Mauricio Soria (26 December 2024 – Present)

== Top goalscorers in Bolivian first division ==
Year	Player	Goals	Nationality
1979	Horacio Baldessari	31	(Argentina)
1981	Juan Carlos Sánchez	30	(Argentina)
1983	Juan Carlos Sánchez	30	(Argentina)
1997	Víctor Hugo Antelo	24	(Bolivia)
1998	Víctor Hugo Antelo	31	(Bolivia)
1999	Víctor Hugo Antelo	31	(Bolivia)
2008 (A)	Anderson Gonzaga	16	(Brazil)

== Presidential history ==
Here is a complete list of Club Blooming presidents from 1946 to present day.

#	Name	Years
1	(Bolivia) Humberto Olmos	1946-1947
2	(Bolivia) Humberto Vaca Pereyra	1948-1949
3	(Bolivia) Mario Quintela	1949-1950
4	(Bolivia) Rodolfo Castedo	1950-1951
5	(Bolivia) Alberto Lozada	1951-1952
6	(Bolivia) Juan Carlos Velarde	1952-1953
7	(Bolivia) Mariano Saucedo Mercado	1953-1958
8	(Bolivia) Ewaldo Durán	1958-1959
9	(Bolivia) Abraham Telchi	1959-1962
10	(Bolivia) Daniel Echazú	1962-1963
11	(Bolivia) Mariano Saucedo Mercado	1963-1966
12	(Bolivia) Rodolfo Castedo	1966-1968
13	(Bolivia) Abraham Telchi	1968-1970
14	(Bolivia) Roger Moreno	1970-1973
15	(Bolivia) Walter Aguilera	1973-1974
16	(Bolivia) Lorgio Serrate	1974-1975
17	(Bolivia) Juan Carlos Velarde	1975-1976
18	(Bolivia) Ulises Casanovas	1976-1977
19	(Bolivia) Roberto Paz	1977-1995
20	(Bolivia) Luis Ernesto Añez	1995
21	(Bolivia) Carlos Aponte	1995-1996
22	(Bolivia) Juan Callaú	1996-1997
23	(Bolivia) Roberto Fernández	1997-1998
24	(Bolivia) Juan Callaú	1998-2000
25	(Bolivia) Roberto Paz	2000-2002
26	(Bolivia) Carlos Bendeck	2003-2011
27	(Bolivia) Ricardo Tarabillo	2011-2012
28	(Bolivia) Federico Sánchez	2012-2013
29	(Bolivia) Roberto Fernández	2013
30	(Bolivia) Erwin Peredo	2013-2016
31	(Bolivia) Jerjes Justiniano	2016-2017
32	(Bolivia) Wilfredo Añez	2017
33	(Bolivia) Esteban Molina	2017
34	(Bolivia) Juan Alfredo Jordán	2017-2021
35	(Bolivia) Sebastián Peña	2021-presente
