= 2004 Copa América squads =

List of footballers

Listed below are the squads of the teams that participated in the 2004 Copa América.

== Group A ==
=== Bolivia ===
Head coach: Ramiro Blacut

No.	Pos.	Player	Date of birth (age)	Caps	Goals	Club
1	GK	José Carlos Fernández	24 January 1971 (aged 33)			(Bolivian Football Federation) Club Bolívar
2	DF	Miguel Ángel Hoyos	11 March 1981 (aged 23)			(Bolivian Football Federation) Oriente Petrolero
3	DF	Sergio Jáuregui	13 March 1985 (aged 19)			(Bolivian Football Federation) Blooming
4	DF	Lorgio Álvarez	29 June 1978 (aged 26)			(Bolivian Football Federation) Oriente Petrolero
5	DF	Ronald Arana	18 January 1977 (aged 27)			(Bolivian Football Federation) Oriente Petrolero
6	FW	Richard Rojas	22 February 1975 (aged 29)			(Bolivian Football Federation) The Strongest
7	MF	Luis Cristaldo (c)	31 August 1969 (aged 34)			(Bolivian Football Federation) The Strongest
8	MF	Rubén Tufiño	9 January 1970 (aged 34)			(Bolivian Football Federation) Club Bolívar
9	FW	Miguel Mercado	20 August 1975 (aged 28)			(Bolivian Football Federation) Club Bolívar
10	MF	Limberg Gutiérrez	19 November 1977 (aged 26)			(Bolivian Football Federation) Club Bolívar
11	FW	Roger Suárez	2 April 1977 (aged 27)			(Bolivian Football Federation) Club Bolívar
12	MF	Wálter Flores	29 October 1978 (aged 25)			(Bolivian Football Federation) San José
13	GK	Sergio Galarza	25 August 1975 (aged 28)			(Bolivian Football Federation) Jorge Wilstermann
14	DF	Hermán Solíz	14 July 1982 (aged 21)			(Bolivian Football Federation) The Strongest
15	MF	Límbert Pizarro	4 April 1979 (aged 25)			(Bolivian Football Federation) Club Bolívar
16	DF	Ronald Raldes	20 April 1981 (aged 23)			(Argentine Football Association) Rosario Central
17	FW	Juan Carlos Arce	10 April 1985 (aged 19)			(Bolivian Football Federation) Oriente Petrolero
18	FW	Getulio Vaca	24 January 1984 (aged 20)			(Bolivian Football Federation) Blooming
19	MF	Gonzalo Galindo	20 October 1974 (aged 29)			(Bolivian Football Federation) Club Bolívar
20	FW	Joaquín Botero	10 December 1977 (aged 26)			(Mexican Football Federation) UNAM
21	GK	Leonardo Fernández	13 March 1974 (aged 30)			(Argentine Football Association) Chacarita Juniors
22	DF	Juan Carlos Sánchez	1 March 1985 (aged 19)			(Bolivian Football Federation) Aurora

=== Colombia ===
Head coach: Reinaldo Rueda

No.	Pos.	Player	Date of birth (age)	Caps	Goals	Club
1	GK	Juan Carlos Henao (c)	30 December 1971 (aged 32)			(Colombian Football Federation) Once Caldas
2	DF	Andrés González	8 January 1984 (aged 20)			(Colombian Football Federation) América de Cali
3	MF	Jaime Castrillón	5 April 1983 (aged 21)			(Colombian Football Federation) Independiente Medellín
4	DF	Jésus Sinisterra	9 December 1975 (aged 28)			(German Football Association) Arminia Bielefeld
5	DF	Andrés Orozco	24 January 1971 (aged 33)			(Argentine Football Association) Racing Club
6	MF	Óscar Díaz	6 June 1972 (aged 32)			(Colombian Football Federation) Deportivo Cali
7	FW	Tressor Moreno	11 January 1979 (aged 25)			(Colombian Football Federation) Deportivo Cali
8	MF	David Ferreira	9 August 1979 (aged 24)			(Colombian Football Federation) América de Cali
9	FW	Sergio Herrera	15 March 1981 (aged 23)			(Colombian Football Federation) América de Cali
10	MF	Neider Morantes	3 August 1975 (aged 28)			(Colombian Football Federation) Independiente Medellín
11	FW	Elkin Murillo	20 September 1977 (aged 26)			(Ecuadorian Football Federation) LDU Quito
12	GK	Bréiner Castillo	5 May 1978 (aged 26)			(Colombian Football Federation) Deportivo Cali
13	DF	Arley Dinas	16 May 1974 (aged 30)			(Colombian Football Federation) Deportes Tolima
14	FW	Edixon Perea	20 April 1984 (aged 20)			(Colombian Football Federation) Atlético Nacional
15	MF	Jhon Viáfara	27 October 1978 (aged 25)			(Colombian Football Federation) Once Caldas
16	FW	Edwin Congo	7 October 1976 (aged 27)			(Royal Spanish Football Federation) Levante
17	MF	Jairo Patiño	5 April 1978 (aged 26)			(Argentine Football Association) Newell's Old Boys
18	MF	Abel Aguilar	6 January 1985 (aged 19)			(Colombian Football Federation) Deportivo Cali
19	MF	José Amaya	16 July 1980 (aged 23)			(Colombian Football Federation) Atlético Junior
20	DF	Gustavo Victoria	14 May 1980 (aged 24)			(Turkish Football Federation) Çaykur Rizespor
21	DF	Hayder Palacio	22 July 1979 (aged 24)			(Colombian Football Federation) Atlético Junior
22	DF	Gonzalo Martínez	30 November 1975 (aged 28)			(Italian Football Federation) Napoli

=== Peru ===
Head coach: (Brazil) Paulo Autuori

No.	Pos.	Player	Date of birth (age)	Caps	Goals	Club
1	GK	Óscar Ibáñez	8 August 1967 (aged 36)			(Peruvian Football Federation) Cienciano
2	DF	Santiago Acasiete	22 November 1977 (aged 26)			(Peruvian Football Federation) Cienciano
3	DF	Miguel Rebosio	20 October 1976 (aged 27)			(Royal Spanish Football Federation) Real Zaragoza
4	DF	Jorge Soto	27 October 1971 (aged 32)			(Peruvian Football Federation) Sporting Cristal
5	DF	Martín Hidalgo	15 June 1976 (aged 28)			(Peruvian Football Federation) Alianza Lima
6	DF	Walter Vílchez	20 February 1982 (aged 22)			(Peruvian Football Federation) Alianza Lima
7	MF	Nolberto Solano	12 December 1974 (aged 29)			(The Football Association) Aston Villa
8	MF	Juan Jayo	20 January 1973 (aged 31)			(Peruvian Football Federation) Alianza Lima
9	FW	Flavio Maestri	21 January 1973 (aged 31)			(Brazilian Football Confederation) Vitória
10	MF	Roberto Palacios	28 December 1972 (aged 31)			(Mexican Football Federation) Morelia
11	MF	Aldo Olcese	23 October 1974 (aged 29)			(Peruvian Football Federation) Alianza Lima
12	GK	Erick Delgado	30 June 1982 (aged 22)			(Peruvian Football Federation) Sporting Cristal
13	DF	Juan La Rosa	3 December 1980 (aged 23)			(Peruvian Football Federation) Cienciano
14	FW	Claudio Pizarro (c)	3 October 1978 (aged 25)			(German Football Association) Bayern Munich
15	DF	Guillermo Salas	10 January 1978 (aged 26)			(Peruvian Football Federation) Alianza Lima
16	FW	Andrés Mendoza	26 April 1978 (aged 26)			(Royal Belgian Football Association) Club Brugge
17	FW	Jefferson Farfán	28 October 1984 (aged 19)			(Peruvian Football Federation) Alianza Lima
18	MF	Pedro García	14 March 1974 (aged 30)			(Peruvian Football Federation) Alianza Lima
19	MF	Marko Ciurlizza	22 February 1978 (aged 26)			(Peruvian Football Federation) Alianza Lima
20	MF	Carlos Zegarra	2 March 1977 (aged 27)			(Peruvian Football Federation) Sporting Cristal
21	GK	Leao Butrón	4 June 1977 (aged 27)			(Peruvian Football Federation) Alianza Lima
22	MF	Julio García	16 June 1981 (aged 23)			(Peruvian Football Federation) Cienciano

=== Venezuela ===
Head coach: Richard Páez

No.	Pos.	Player	Date of birth (age)	Caps	Goals	Club
1	GK	Gilberto Angelucci	7 August 1967 (aged 36)			(Venezuelan Football Federation) Maracaibo
2	DF	Luis Vallenilla	13 March 1974 (aged 30)			(Venezuelan Football Federation) Caracas
3	DF	José Manuel Rey (c)	20 May 1975 (aged 29)			(Venezuelan Football Federation) Caracas
4	DF	Jonay Hernández	15 November 1979 (aged 24)			(Scottish Football Association) Dundee
5	MF	Miguel Mea Vitali	19 February 1981 (aged 23)			(Venezuelan Football Federation) Caracas
6	DF	Alejandro Cichero	20 April 1977 (aged 27)			(Uruguayan Football Association) Nacional
7	FW	Daniel Noriega	30 March 1977 (aged 27)			(Colombian Football Federation) Independiente Medellín
8	FW	Cristian Cásseres	29 June 1977 (aged 27)			(Venezuelan Football Federation) Maracaibo
9	FW	Alexander Rondón	30 August 1977 (aged 26)			(Venezuelan Football Federation) Deportivo Táchira
10	FW	Massimo Margiotta	27 July 1977 (aged 26)			(Italian Football Federation) Vicenza
11	MF	Ricardo Páez	9 February 1979 (aged 25)			(Ecuadorian Football Federation) Barcelona SC
12	GK	Manuel Sanhouse	16 July 1975 (aged 28)			(Venezuelan Football Federation) Deportivo Táchira
13	DF	Leonel Vielma	30 August 1978 (aged 25)			(Venezuelan Football Federation) Deportivo Táchira
14	MF	Leopoldo Jiménez	22 May 1978 (aged 26)			(Venezuelan Football Federation) Maracaibo
15	FW	Wilfredo Moreno	19 April 1976 (aged 28)			(Venezuelan Football Federation) Mineros de Guayana
16	FW	Ruberth Morán	9 November 1973 (aged 30)			(Venezuelan Football Federation) Maracaibo
17	DF	Jorge Rojas	10 January 1977 (aged 27)			(Venezuelan Football Federation) Caracas
18	MF	Juan Arango	17 May 1980 (aged 24)			(Mexican Football Federation) Puebla
19	MF	Andreé González	30 June 1975 (aged 29)			(Uruguayan Football Association) Defensor Sporting
20	MF	Héctor Gonzalez	11 April 1977 (aged 27)			(Argentine Football Association) Colón
21	DF	Andrés Rouga	13 March 1974 (aged 30)			(Venezuelan Football Federation) Caracas
22	MF	Pedro Depablos	2 January 1977 (aged 27)			(Venezuelan Football Federation) Deportivo Táchira

== Group B ==
=== Argentina ===
Head coach: Marcelo Bielsa

No.	Pos.	Player	Date of birth (age)	Caps	Goals	Club
1	GK	Roberto Abbondanzieri	19 August 1972 (aged 31)			(Argentine Football Association) Boca Juniors
2	DF	Roberto Ayala (c)	14 April 1973 (aged 31)			(Royal Spanish Football Federation) Valencia
3	DF	Juan Pablo Sorín	5 May 1976 (aged 28)			(French Football Federation) Paris Saint-Germain
4	DF	Facundo Quiroga	10 January 1978 (aged 26)			(Portuguese Football Federation) Sporting CP
5	MF	Javier Mascherano	8 June 1984 (aged 20)			(Argentine Football Association) River Plate
6	DF	Gabriel Heinze	19 April 1978 (aged 26)			(French Football Federation) Paris Saint-Germain
7	FW	Javier Saviola	11 December 1981 (aged 22)			(Royal Spanish Football Federation) Barcelona
8	DF	Javier Zanetti	10 August 1973 (aged 30)			(Italian Football Federation) Inter Milan
9	FW	Luciano Figueroa	19 May 1981 (aged 23)			(Mexican Football Federation) Cruz Azul
10	MF	Andrés D'Alessandro	15 April 1981 (aged 23)			(German Football Association) VfL Wolfsburg
11	FW	Carlos Tevez	5 February 1984 (aged 20)			(Argentine Football Association) Boca Juniors
12	GK	Pablo Cavallero	13 April 1974 (aged 30)			(Royal Spanish Football Federation) Celta Vigo
13	DF	Diego Placente	24 April 1977 (aged 27)			(German Football Association) Bayer Leverkusen
14	DF	Clemente Rodríguez	31 July 1981 (aged 22)			(Argentine Football Association) Boca Juniors
15	DF	Leandro Fernández	30 January 1983 (aged 21)			(Argentine Football Association) Newell's Old Boys
16	MF	Lucho González	19 January 1981 (aged 23)			(Argentine Football Association) River Plate
17	MF	Mariano González	5 May 1981 (aged 23)			(Argentine Football Association) Racing Club
18	MF	Kily González	7 August 1974 (aged 29)			(Italian Football Federation) Inter Milan
19	MF	César Delgado	18 August 1981 (aged 22)			(Mexican Football Federation) Cruz Azul
20	MF	Nicolás Medina	17 February 1982 (aged 22)			(Royal Spanish Football Federation) Leganés
21	FW	Mauro Rosales	24 February 1981 (aged 23)			(Argentine Football Association) Newell's Old Boys
22	DF	Fabricio Coloccini	22 January 1982 (aged 22)			(Royal Spanish Football Federation) Villareal

=== Ecuador ===
Head coach: (Colombia) Hernán Darío Gómez

No.	Pos.	Player	Date of birth (age)	Caps	Goals	Club
1	GK	Jacinto Espinoza	24 November 1969 (aged 34)			(Ecuadorian Football Federation) LDU Quito
2	DF	Jorge Guagua	28 September 1981 (aged 22)			(Ecuadorian Football Federation) El Nacional
3	DF	Iván Hurtado	16 August 1974 (aged 29)			(Royal Spanish Football Federation) Real Murcia
4	DF	Ulises de la Cruz	8 February 1974 (aged 30)			(The Football Association) Aston Villa
5	MF	Alfonso Obregón	12 May 1972 (aged 32)			(Ecuadorian Football Federation) LDU Quito
6	DF	Paúl Ambrosi	14 October 1980 (aged 23)			(Ecuadorian Football Federation) LDU Quito
7	FW	Franklin Salas	30 August 1981 (aged 22)			(Ecuadorian Football Federation) LDU Quito
8	FW	Ebelio Ordóñez	3 November 1972 (aged 31)			(Ecuadorian Football Federation) El Nacional
9	FW	Gustavo Figueroa	30 August 1978 (aged 25)			(Ecuadorian Football Federation) Aucas
10	MF	Álex Aguinaga (c)	9 July 1969 (aged 34)			(Ecuadorian Football Federation) LDU Quito
11	FW	Agustín Delgado	23 December 1974 (aged 29)			(Ecuadorian Football Federation) Aucas
12	GK	Oswaldo Ibarra	8 September 1969 (aged 34)			(Ecuadorian Football Federation) El Nacional
13	MF	Luis Saritama	20 October 1983 (aged 20)			(Ecuadorian Football Federation) Deportivo Quito
14	FW	Jhonny Baldeón	15 June 1981 (aged 23)			(Ecuadorian Football Federation) Deportivo Quito
15	MF	Marlon Ayoví	27 September 1971 (aged 32)			(Ecuadorian Football Federation) Deportivo Quito
16	MF	Cléber Chalá	29 June 1971 (aged 33)			(Ecuadorian Football Federation) Deportivo Quito
17	DF	Giovanny Espinoza	12 April 1977 (aged 27)			(Ecuadorian Football Federation) LDU Quito
18	DF	Néicer Reasco	23 July 1977 (aged 26)			(Ecuadorian Football Federation) LDU Quito
19	MF	Édison Méndez	16 March 1979 (aged 25)			(Mexican Football Federation) Deportivo Irapuato
20	MF	Edwin Tenorio	16 June 1976 (aged 28)			(Ecuadorian Football Federation) Barcelona SC
21	MF	Leonardo Soledispa	15 January 1983 (aged 21)			(Ecuadorian Football Federation) Barcelona SC
22	GK	Damián Lanza	10 April 1982 (aged 22)			(Ecuadorian Football Federation) Deportivo Cuenca

=== Mexico ===
Head coach: (Argentina) Ricardo La Volpe

No.	Pos.	Player	Date of birth (age)	Caps	Goals	Club
1	GK	Oswaldo Sánchez	21 September 1973 (aged 30)			(Mexican Football Federation) Guadalajara
2	DF	Claudio Suárez	17 December 1968 (aged 35)			(Mexican Football Federation) Tigres UANL
3	DF	Omar Briceño	30 January 1978 (aged 26)			(Mexican Football Federation) Tigres UANL
4	DF	Rafael Márquez (c)	13 February 1979 (aged 25)			(Royal Spanish Football Federation) Barcelona
5	DF	Duilio Davino	21 March 1976 (aged 28)			(Mexican Football Federation) América
6	MF	Gerardo Torrado	30 April 1979 (aged 25)			(Royal Spanish Football Federation) Sevilla
7	MF	Octavio Valdez	7 December 1973 (aged 30)			(Mexican Football Federation) Pachuca
8	MF	Pável Pardo	26 July 1976 (aged 27)			(Mexican Football Federation) América
9	FW	Jared Borgetti	14 August 1973 (aged 30)			(Mexican Football Federation) Santos Laguna
10	FW	Adolfo Bautista	15 May 1979 (aged 25)			(Mexican Football Federation) Guadalajara
11	FW	Daniel Osorno	16 March 1979 (aged 25)			(Mexican Football Federation) Monterrey
12	GK	Óscar Pérez	1 February 1973 (aged 31)			(Mexican Football Federation) Cruz Azul
13	GK	Moisés Muñoz	1 February 1980 (aged 24)			(Mexican Football Federation) Morelia
14	MF	Ramón Morales	10 October 1975 (aged 28)			(Mexican Football Federation) Guadalajara
15	DF	David Oteo	27 July 1973 (aged 30)			(Mexican Football Federation) Tigres UANL
16	DF	Mario Méndez	1 June 1979 (aged 25)			(Mexican Football Federation) Toluca
17	FW	Francisco Palencia	28 April 1973 (aged 31)			(Mexican Football Federation) Guadalajara
18	DF	Salvador Carmona	22 August 1975 (aged 28)			(Mexican Football Federation) Guadalajara
19	MF	Jaime Lozano	29 September 1979 (aged 24)			(Mexican Football Federation) UNAM
20	DF	Ricardo Osorio	30 March 1980 (aged 24)			(Mexican Football Federation) Cruz Azul
21	MF	Jesús Arellano	8 May 1973 (aged 31)			(Mexican Football Federation) Monterrey
22	DF	Héctor Altamirano	17 March 1977 (aged 27)			(Mexican Football Federation) Santos Laguna

=== Uruguay ===
Head coach: Jorge Fossati

No.	Pos.	Player	Date of birth (age)	Caps	Goals	Club
1	GK	Sebastián Viera*	3 July 1983 (aged 21)			(Uruguayan Football Association) Nacional
2	DF	Joe Bizera	17 May 1980 (aged 24)			(Uruguayan Football Association) Peñarol
3	DF	Darío Rodríguez	17 September 1974 (aged 29)			(German Football Association) Schalke 04
4	DF	Paolo Montero (c)	3 September 1971 (aged 32)			(Italian Football Federation) Juventus
5	MF	Marcelo Sosa	6 February 1978 (aged 26)			(Russian Football Union) Spartak Moscow
6	MF	Alejandro Lago	28 June 1979 (aged 25)			(Uruguayan Football Association) Fénix
7	MF	Gustavo Varela	14 May 1978 (aged 26)			(German Football Association) Schalke 04
8	MF	Omar Pouso	28 February 1980 (aged 24)			(Uruguayan Football Association) Danubio
9	FW	Darío Silva	2 September 1972 (aged 31)			(Royal Spanish Football Federation) Sevilla
10	MF	Juan Martín Parodi	22 September 1974 (aged 29)			(Hellenic Football Federation) Panionios
11	MF	Cristian Rodríguez	30 September 1985 (aged 18)			(Uruguayan Football Association) Peñarol
12	GK	Luis Barbat	17 June 1968 (aged 36)			(Uruguayan Football Association) Danubio
13	MF	Fabián Estoyanoff	27 September 1982 (aged 21)			(Uruguayan Football Association) Fénix
14	DF	Guillermo Rodríguez	21 March 1984 (aged 20)			(Uruguayan Football Association) Danubio
15	MF	Diego Pérez	18 May 1980 (aged 24)			(Uruguayan Football Association) Peñarol
16	MF	Javier Delgado	8 July 1975 (aged 28)			(Russian Football Union) Saturn Ramenskoye
17	DF	Carlos Diogo	18 July 1983 (aged 20)			(Uruguayan Football Association) Peñarol
18	FW	Richard Morales	21 February 1975 (aged 29)			(Royal Spanish Football Federation) Osasuna
19	MF	Jorge Martínez	5 April 1983 (aged 21)			(Uruguayan Football Association) Montevideo Wanderers
20	FW	Carlos Bueno	10 May 1980 (aged 24)			(Uruguayan Football Association) Peñarol
21	FW	Diego Forlán	19 May 1979 (aged 25)			(The Football Association) Manchester United
22	FW	Vicente Sánchez	7 December 1979 (aged 24)			(Mexican Football Federation) Toluca

- * Replaced Fabián Carini due to injury.

== Group C ==
=== Brazil ===
Head coach: Carlos Alberto Parreira

No.	Pos.	Player	Date of birth (age)	Caps	Goals	Club
1	GK	Júlio César	3 September 1979 (aged 24)	0	0	(Brazilian Football Confederation) Flamengo
2	DF	Mancini	8 January 1980 (aged 24)	1	0	(Italian Football Federation) Roma
3	DF	Luisão	13 February 1981 (aged 23)	10	0	(Portuguese Football Federation) Benfica
4	DF	Juan	1 February 1979 (aged 25)	17	0	(German Football Association) Bayer Leverkusen
5	MF	Renato	15 May 1979 (aged 25)	5	0	(Brazilian Football Confederation) Santos
6	DF	Gustavo Nery	22 July 1977 (aged 26)	0	0	(Brazilian Football Confederation) São Paulo
7	FW	Adriano	17 February 1982 (aged 22)	7	3	(Italian Football Federation) Inter Milan
8	MF	Kléberson	19 June 1979 (aged 25)	21	2	(The Football Association) Manchester United
9	FW	Luís Fabiano	8 November 1980 (aged 23)	6	4	(Brazilian Football Confederation) São Paulo
10	MF	Alex (c)	14 September 1977 (aged 26)	35	10	(Brazilian Football Confederation) Cruzeiro
11	MF	Edu	15 May 1978 (aged 26)	4	0	(The Football Association) Arsenal
12	GK	Fábio	30 September 1980 (aged 23)	0	0	(Brazilian Football Confederation) Vasco da Gama
13	DF	Maicon	26 July 1981 (aged 22)	5	1	(Brazilian Football Confederation) Cruzeiro
14	DF	Marcelo Bordon	7 January 1976 (aged 28)	1	0	(German Football Association) VfB Stuttgart
15	DF	Cris	3 June 1977 (aged 27)	12	1	(Brazilian Football Confederation) Cruzeiro
16	MF	Dudu Cearense	15 April 1983 (aged 21)	0	0	(Japan Football Association) Kashiwa Reysol
17	DF	Adriano Correia	26 October 1984 (aged 19)	0	0	(Brazilian Football Confederation) Coritiba
18	MF	Júlio Baptista	1 October 1981 (aged 22)	12	0	(Royal Spanish Football Federation) Sevilla
19	MF	Diego	28 February 1985 (aged 19)	7	2	(Brazilian Football Confederation) Santos
20	MF	Felipe	2 September 1977 (aged 26)	5	0	(Brazilian Football Confederation) Flamengo
21	FW	Ricardo Oliveira	6 May 1980 (aged 24)	0	0	(Royal Spanish Football Federation) Valencia
22	FW	Vágner Love	11 June 1984 (aged 20)	0	0	(Brazilian Football Confederation) Palmeiras

=== Chile ===
Head coach: Juvenal Olmos

No.	Pos.	Player	Date of birth (age)	Caps	Goals	Club
1	GK	Claudio Bravo	13 April 1983 (aged 21)			(Chile) Colo-Colo
2	DF	Cristián Álvarez	20 January 1980 (aged 24)			(Chile) Universidad Católica
3	DF	Luis Fuentes	14 August 1971 (aged 32)			(Chile) Cobreloa
4	DF	Rodrigo Pérez	19 August 1973 (aged 30)			(Chile) Cobreloa
5	DF	Miguel Ramírez (c)	11 June 1970 (aged 34)			(Chile) Colo-Colo
6	MF	Clarence Acuña	8 February 1975 (aged 29)			(Argentina) Rosario Central
7	MF	Rodrigo Valenzuela	22 November 1975 (aged 28)			(Mexico) Atlas
8	MF	Rodrigo Millar	3 November 1981 (aged 22)			(Chile) Huachipato
9	FW	Sebastián González	14 December 1978 (aged 25)			(Mexico) Atlante
10	MF	Luis Jiménez	17 June 1984 (aged 20)			(Italy) Ternana
11	MF	Mark González	10 May 1984 (aged 20)			(Chile) Universidad Católica
12	GK	Alex Varas	26 March 1976 (aged 28)			(Chile) Santiago Wanderers
13	DF	Ismael Fuentes	4 August 1981 (aged 22)			(Chile) Rangers
14	MF	Moisés Villarroel	12 February 1976 (aged 28)			(Chile) Colo-Colo
15	FW	Héctor Mancilla	12 November 1980 (aged 23)			(Chile) Huachipato
16	MF	Jonathan Cisternas	16 June 1980 (aged 24)			(Chile) Cobreloa
17	MF	Milovan Mirošević	20 June 1980 (aged 24)			(Argentina) Racing Club
18	MF	Rodrigo Meléndez	3 October 1977 (aged 26)			(Argentina) Quilmes
19	DF	Rafael Olarra	26 May 1978 (aged 26)			(Argentina) Independiente
20	MF	Mauricio Aros	9 March 1976 (aged 28)			(Chile) Huachipato
21	MF	Luis Pedro Figueroa	14 May 1983 (aged 21)			(Chile) Universidad de Concepción
22	FW	Patricio Galaz	31 December 1976 (aged 27)			(Chile) Cobreloa

=== Costa Rica ===
Head coach: (Colombia) Jorge Luis Pinto

No.	Pos.	Player	Date of birth (age)	Caps	Goals	Club
1	GK	Víctor Bolívar	3 September 1983 (aged 20)			(Costa Rica) Liberia
2	DF	Michael Umaña	16 July 1982 (aged 21)			(Costa Rica) Herediano
3	DF	Luis Marín (c)	10 August 1974 (aged 29)			(Costa Rica) Alajuelense
4	DF	Alexander Castro	14 February 1979 (aged 25)			(Costa Rica) Alajuelense
5	FW	Whayne Wilson	7 September 1975 (aged 28)			(Costa Rica) Ramonense
6	MF	Cristian Oviedo	25 August 1978 (aged 25)			(Costa Rica) Herediano
7	MF	Alonso Solís	14 October 1978 (aged 25)			(Costa Rica) Saprissa
8	MF	Danny Fonseca	7 November 1979 (aged 24)			(Costa Rica) Cartaginés
9	FW	Álvaro Saborío	25 March 1982 (aged 22)			(Costa Rica) Saprissa
10	MF	Walter Centeno	6 October 1974 (aged 29)			(Costa Rica) Saprissa
11	FW	Rónald Gómez	24 January 1975 (aged 29)			(Mexican Football Federation) Deportivo Irapuato
12	DF	Leonardo González	21 November 1980 (aged 23)			(Costa Rica) Herediano
13	MF	Carlos Hernández	9 April 1982 (aged 22)			(Costa Rica) Alajuelense
14	MF	Cristian Badilla	11 July 1978 (aged 25)			(Costa Rica) Herediano
15	DF	Júnior Díaz	12 October 1983 (aged 20)			(Costa Rica) Herediano
16	DF	Try Bennett	5 August 1975 (aged 28)			(Costa Rica) Saprissa
17	MF	Steven Bryce	16 August 1977 (aged 26)			(Costa Rica) Alajuelense
18	GK	José Porras	8 November 1970 (aged 33)			(Costa Rica) Saprissa
19	DF	Mauricio Wright	20 December 1970 (aged 33)			(Costa Rica) Herediano
20	DF	Douglas Sequeira	23 August 1977 (aged 26)			(Costa Rica) Saprissa
21	FW	Andy Herron	2 March 1978 (aged 26)			(Costa Rica) Herediano
22	GK	Ricardo González	6 March 1974 (aged 30)			(Costa Rica) Alajuelense

=== Paraguay ===
Head coach: Carlos Jara Saguier

No.	Pos.	Player	Date of birth (age)	Caps	Goals	Club
1	GK	Justo Villar	30 June 1977 (aged 27)			(Paraguay) Libertad
2	DF	Emilio Martínez	10 April 1981 (aged 23)			(Paraguay) Libertad
3	DF	Julio Manzur	22 June 1981 (aged 23)			(Paraguay) Guaraní
4	DF	Carlos Gamarra (c)	17 February 1971 (aged 33)			(Italy) Inter Milan
5	DF	José Devaca	18 September 1982 (aged 21)			(Paraguay) Cerro Porteño
6	MF	Jorge Brítez	2 August 1981 (aged 22)			(Portugal) Moreirense
7	FW	Dante López	16 August 1983 (aged 20)			(Spain) Córdoba
8	MF	Édgar Barreto	15 July 1984 (aged 19)			(Netherlands) NEC
9	FW	Fredy Bareiro	27 March 1982 (aged 22)			(Paraguay) Libertad
10	MF	Diego Figueredo	28 April 1982 (aged 22)			(Spain) Real Valladolid
11	FW	Julio González	26 August 1981 (aged 22)			(Paraguay) Nacional
12	GK	Diego Barreto	16 July 1981 (aged 22)			(Paraguay) Cerro Porteño
13	MF	Carlos Paredes	16 July 1976 (aged 27)			(Italy) Reggina
14	MF	Ernesto Cristaldo	16 March 1984 (aged 20)			(Paraguay) Cerro Porteño
15	DF	Pedro Benítez	23 March 1981 (aged 23)			(Paraguay) Cerro Porteño
16	DF	David Villalba	13 April 1982 (aged 22)			(Paraguay) Olimpia
17	DF	Celso Esquivel	20 March 1981 (aged 23)			(Argentina) San Lorenzo
18	DF	Derlis González	25 May 1978 (aged 26)			(Paraguay) 12 de Octubre
19	FW	Nelson Valdez	28 November 1983 (aged 20)			(Germany) Werder Bremen
20	MF	Julio dos Santos	7 May 1983 (aged 21)			(Paraguay) Cerro Porteño
21	MF	Aureliano Torres	16 June 1982 (aged 22)			(Paraguay) Guaraní
22	FW	Fabio Escobar	15 February 1982 (aged 22)			(Paraguay) Nacional
