= 2004 Copa América Group A =

Group A of the 2004 Copa América was one of the three groups of competing nations in the 2004 Copa América. It comprised Bolivia, Colombia, Peru, and Venezuela. Group play ran from 6 to 12 July 2004.

Colombia won the group and faced Costa Rica, the second-best third-placed finishers, in the quarter-finals. Peru finished second and faced Argentina—the runners-up of Group B—in the quarter-finals. Bolivia and Venezuela finished third and fourth in the group, respectively, and were eliminated from the tournament.

== Standings ==
Team	Pld	W	D	L	GF	GA	GD	Pts
Colombia	3	2	1	0	4	2	+2	7
Peru (H)	3	1	2	0	7	5	+2	5
Bolivia	3	0	2	1	3	4	−1	2
Venezuela	3	0	1	2	2	5	−3	1

(H) Hosts
Teams that advanced to the quarter-finals
- Group winners
- Group runners-up
- Best two third-placed teams among all groups

All times are in local, Peru Time (UTC−05:00).

== Matches ==
=== Venezuela vs Colombia ===
6 July 2004
17:30

Venezuela	0–1	Colombia
	Report	Moreno 21' (pen.)

Estadio Nacional, Lima
Attendance: 45,000
Referee: Márcio Rezende (Brazil)

Venezuela	Colombia

GK	1	Gilberto Angelucci
RB	2	Luis Vallenilla		(substituted off) 70'
CB	3	José Manuel Rey
CB	6	Alejandro Cichero	(yellow card) 75'
LB	4	Jonay Hernández		(substituted off) 65'
CM	5	Miguel Mea Vitali
CM	14	Leopoldo Jiménez
RW	11	Ricardo Páez
LW	18	Juan Arango
CF	9	Alexander Rondón		(substituted off) 39'
CF	16	Ruberth Morán	(yellow card) 41'
Substitutions:
FW	10	Massimo Margiotta		(substituted on) 39'
DF	17	Jorge Rojas	(yellow card) 65'	(substituted on) 65'
MF	20	Héctor Gonzalez		(substituted on) 70'
Manager:
Richard Páez

GK	1	Juan Carlos Henao	(yellow card) 85'
RB	22	Gonzalo Martínez	(yellow card) 32'
CB	2	Andrés González
CB	5	Andrés Orozco
LB	20	Gustavo Victoria
CM	6	Óscar Díaz
CM	18	Abel Aguilar		(substituted off) 76'
RW	17	Jairo Patiño	(yellow card) 23'
LW	8	David Ferreira		(substituted off) 89'
CF	7	Tressor Moreno		(substituted off) 70'
CF	9	Sergio Herrera
Substitutions:
MF	15	Jhon Viáfara		(substituted on) 70'
MF	3	Jaime Castrillón	(yellow card) 87'	(substituted on) 76'
MF	10	Neider Morantes		(substituted on) 89'
Manager:
Reinaldo Rueda

=== Peru vs Bolivia ===
6 July 2004
20:15

Peru	2–2	Bolivia
Pizarro 67' (pen.); Palacios 86'	Report	Botero 35'; Álvarez 57'

Estadio Nacional, Lima
Attendance: 45,000
Referee: Héctor Baldassi (Argentina)

Peru	Bolivia

GK	1	Óscar Ibáñez
RB	4	Jorge Soto
CB	2	Santiago Acasiete
CB	3	Miguel Rebosio
LB	6	Walter Vílchez
DM	8	Juan Jayo
RM	7	Nolberto Solano		(substituted off) 62'
LM	20	Carlos Zegarra	(yellow card) 39'	(substituted off) 80'
AM	17	Jefferson Farfán
CF	9	Flavio Maestri		(substituted off) 62'
CF	14	Claudio Pizarro
Substitutions:
MF	10	Roberto Palacios		(substituted on) 62'
FW	16	Andrés Mendoza		(substituted on) 62'
MF	11	Aldo Olcese		(substituted on) 80'
Manager:
(Brazil) Paulo Autuori

GK	21	Leonardo Fernández	(yellow card) 75'
RB	3	Sergio Jáuregui
CB	5	Ronald Arana
CB	16	Ronald Raldes
LB	4	Lorgio Álvarez
CM	15	Límbert Pizarro		(substituted off) 84'
CM	8	Rubén Tufiño
RW	7	Luis Cristaldo
LW	10	Limberg Gutiérrez		(substituted off) 63'
CF	9	Miguel Mercado		(substituted off) 72'
CF	20	Joaquín Botero	(yellow card) 84'
Substitutions:
MF	19	Gonzalo Galindo		(substituted on) 63'
FW	6	Richard Rojas		(substituted on) 72'
FW	17	Juan Carlos Arce		(substituted on) 84'
Manager:
Ramiro Blacut

=== Colombia vs Bolivia ===
9 July 2004
17:30

Colombia	1–0	Bolivia
Perea 90'	Report

Estadio Nacional, Lima
Attendance: 35,000
Referee: Pedro Ramos (Ecuador)

Colombia	Bolivia

GK	1	Juan Carlos Henao
RB	22	Gonzalo Martínez
CB	5	Andrés Orozco
CB	13	Arley Dinas	(yellow card) 23'
LB	20	Gustavo Victoria
CM	18	Abel Aguilar		(substituted off) 84'
CM	8	David Ferreira		(substituted off) 79'
RW	6	Óscar Díaz
LW	17	Jairo Patiño
CF	7	Tressor Moreno		(substituted off) 71'
CF	9	Sergio Herrera
Substitutions:
FW	11	Elkin Murillo		(substituted on) 71'
FW	14	Edixon Perea		(substituted on) 79'
MF	15	Jhon Viáfara		(substituted on) 84'
Manager:
Reinaldo Rueda

GK	21	Leonardo Fernández
RB	3	Sergio Jáuregui
CB	5	Ronald Arana
CB	16	Ronald Raldes	(yellow card) 34'
LB	4	Lorgio Álvarez
CM	15	Límbert Pizarro
CM	8	Rubén Tufiño	(yellow card) 20'
RW	7	Luis Cristaldo		(substituted off) 34'
LW	10	Limberg Gutiérrez
CF	9	Miguel Mercado		(substituted off) 65'
CF	20	Joaquín Botero
Substitutions:
MF	12	Wálter Flores	(yellow card) 67'	(substituted on) 34'
FW	11	Roger Suárez		(substituted on) 65'
Manager:
Ramiro Blacut

=== Peru vs Venezuela ===
9 July 2004
19:45

Peru	3–1	Venezuela
Farfán 34'; Solano 61'; Acasiete 72'	Report	Margiotta 74'

Estadio Nacional, Lima
Attendance: 43,000
Referee: Rubén Selman (Chile)

Peru	Venezuela

GK	1	Óscar Ibáñez
RB	15	Guillermo Salas
CB	3	Miguel Rebosio
CB	2	Santiago Acasiete
LB	6	Walter Vílchez
DM	8	Juan Jayo
RM	7	Nolberto Solano		(substituted off) 79'
LM	10	Roberto Palacios	(yellow card) 35'	(substituted off) 84'
AM	17	Jefferson Farfán	(yellow card) 34'
CF	14	Claudio Pizarro	(yellow card) 81' (yellow-red card) 87'
CF	16	Andrés Mendoza		(substituted off) 89'
Substitutions:
DF	4	Jorge Soto		(substituted on) 79'
MF	19	Marko Ciurlizza		(substituted on) 84'
MF	9	Flavio Maestri		(substituted on) 89'
Manager:
(Brazil) Paulo Autuori

GK	1	Gilberto Angelucci
RB	2	Luis Vallenilla	(yellow card) 63'
CB	3	José Manuel Rey
CB	6	Alejandro Cichero
LB	4	Jonay Hernández	(yellow card) 70'
CM	14	Leopoldo Jiménez
CM	5	Miguel Mea Vitali	(yellow card) 46' (yellow-red card) 59'
RW	11	Ricardo Páez	(yellow card) 46'	(substituted off) 65'
CAM	18	Juan Arango
LW	17	Jorge Rojas	(yellow card) 38'	(substituted off) 46'
CF	9	Alexander Rondón		(substituted off) 58'
Substitutions:
FW	16	Ruberth Morán		(substituted on) 46'
FW	10	Massimo Margiotta		(substituted on) 58'
MF	20	Héctor Gonzalez		(substituted on) 65'
Manager:
Richard Páez

=== Venezuela vs Bolivia ===
12 July 2004
17:30

Venezuela	1–1	Bolivia
Morán 27'	Report	Galindo 33'

Estadio Mansiche, Trujillo
Attendance: 25,000
Referee: William Mattus (Costa Rica)

Venezuela	Bolivia

GK	1	Gilberto Angelucci
RB	2	Luis Vallenilla
CB	3	José Manuel Rey
CB	6	Alejandro Cichero
LB	4	Jonay Hernández
CM	19	Andreé González	(yellow card) 52'	(substituted off) 74'
CM	14	Leopoldo Jiménez
RW	11	Ricardo Páez
LW	18	Juan Arango
CF	10	Massimo Margiotta		(substituted off) 64'
CF	16	Ruberth Morán		(substituted off) 58'
Substitutions:
FW	9	Alexander Rondón	(yellow card) 84'	(substituted on) 58'
MF	20	Héctor Gonzalez		(substituted on) 64'
DF	13	Leonel Vielma		(substituted on) 74'
Manager:
Richard Páez

GK	21	Leonardo Fernández
RB	3	Sergio Jáuregui
CB	5	Ronald Arana
CB	16	Ronald Raldes
LB	4	Lorgio Álvarez
CM	15	Límbert Pizarro		(substituted off) 21'
CM	19	Gonzalo Galindo
RW	11	Roger Suárez		(substituted off) 70'
LW	10	Limberg Gutiérrez
CF	9	Miguel Mercado	(yellow card) 58'	(substituted off) 59'
CF	20	Joaquín Botero
Substitutions:
MF	8	Rubén Tufiño		(substituted on) 21'
FW	17	Juan Carlos Arce		(substituted on) 59'
MF	12	Wálter Flores		(substituted on) 70'
Manager:
Ramiro Blacut

=== Peru vs Colombia ===
12 July 2004
19:45

Peru	2–2	Colombia
Solano 58'; Maestri 60'	Report	Congo 33'; Aguilar 53'

Estadio Mansiche, Trujillo
Attendance: 25,000
Referee: Marco Rodríguez (Mexico)

Peru	Colombia

GK	1	Óscar Ibáñez
RB	15	Guillermo Salas
CB	3	Miguel Rebosio		(substituted off) 13'
CB	2	Santiago Acasiete
LB	6	Walter Vílchez
DM	7	Nolberto Solano		(substituted off) 89'
DM	8	Juan Jayo	(yellow card) 42'
RW	16	Andrés Mendoza
LW	10	Roberto Palacios
CAM	17	Jefferson Farfán	(yellow card) 60'
CF	9	Flavio Maestri	(yellow card) 42'	(substituted off) 75'
Substitutions:
DF	4	Jorge Soto		(substituted on) 13'
MF	18	Pedro García		(substituted on) 75'
MF	19	Marko Ciurlizza		(substituted on) 89'
Manager:
(Brazil) Paulo Autuori

GK	1	Juan Carlos Henao
RB	22	Gonzalo Martínez	(yellow card) 72'
CB	5	Andrés Orozco
CB	13	Arley Dinas	(yellow card) 36'	(substituted off) 44'
LB	20	Gustavo Victoria
CM	18	Abel Aguilar
CM	6	Óscar Díaz	(yellow card) 57'
RW	15	Jhon Viáfara
LW	10	Neider Morantes		(substituted off) 82'
CF	11	Elkin Murillo
CF	16	Edwin Congo		(substituted off) 77'
Substitutions:
DF	2	Andrés González	(yellow card) 44'	(substituted on) 44'
FW	14	Edixon Perea		(substituted on) 77'
MF	8	David Ferreira	(yellow card) 86'	(substituted on) 82'
Manager:
Reinaldo Rueda
