= Bolivia national football team results (2000–2019) =

This page details the match results and statistics of the Bolivia national football team from 2000 to 2019.

== Key ==
Key to matches

- Att.=Match attendance
- (H)=Home ground
- (A)=Away ground
- (N)=Neutral ground

Key to record by opponent

- Pld=Games played
- W=Games won
- D=Games drawn
- L=Games lost
- GF=Goals for
- GA=Goals against

== Results ==
Bolivia's score is shown first in each case.

| No. | Date | Venue | Opponents | Score | Competition | Bolivia scorers | Att. | Ref. |
|---|---|---|---|---|---|---|---|---|
| 287 | 5 March 2000 | Estadio Hernando Siles, La Paz (H) | Haiti | 9–2 | Friendly | R. Suárez (4), Baldivieso, Botero (2), Carbello | 18,841 | |
| 288 | 16 March 2000 | Estadio José Pachencho Romero, Maracaibo (A) | Venezuela | 0–0 | Friendly | | 8,000 | |
| 289 | 29 March 2000 | Estadio Centenario, Montevideo (A) | Uruguay | 0–1 | 2002 FIFA World Cup qualification | | 49,811 | |
| 290 | 26 April 2000 | Estadio Hernando Siles, La Paz (H) | Colombia | 1–1 | 2002 FIFA World Cup qualification | E. Sánchez | 35,500 | |
| 291 | 4 June 2000 | Estadio Monumental, Buenos Aires (A) | Argentina | 0–1 | 2002 FIFA World Cup qualification | | 50,669 | |
| 292 | 14 June 2000 | Tosu Stadium, Tosu (N) | Slovakia | 0–2 | 2000 Kirin Cup | | 8,023 | |
| 293 | 18 June 2000 | International Stadium Yokohama, Yokohama (N) | Japan | 0–2 | 2000 Kirin Cup | | 65,073 | |
| 294 | 28 June 2000 | Estadio Polideportivo de Pueblo Nuevo, San Cristóbal (A) | Venezuela | 2–4 | 2002 FIFA World Cup qualification | Moreno, Baldivieso | 7,000 | |
| 295 | 19 July 2000 | Estadio Hernando Siles, La Paz (H) | Chile | 1–0 | 2002 FIFA World Cup qualification | R. Suárez | 35,412 | |
| 296 | 27 July 2000 | Estadio Hernando Siles, La Paz (H) | Paraguay | 0–0 | 2002 FIFA World Cup qualification | | 39,142 | |
| 297 | 16 August 2000 | La Casa Blanca, Quito (A) | Ecuador | 0–2 | 2002 FIFA World Cup qualification | | 25,000 | |
| 298 | 3 September 2000 | Maracanã Stadium, Rio de Janeiro (A) | Brazil | 0–5 | 2002 FIFA World Cup qualification | | 55,000 | |
| 299 | 27 September 2000 | Spartan Stadium, San Jose (A) | Mexico | 0–1 | Friendly | | 30,154 | |
| 300 | 8 October 2000 | Estadio Hernando Siles, La Paz (H) | Peru | 1–0 | 2002 FIFA World Cup qualification | R. Suárez | 21,791 | |
| 301 | 15 November 2000 | Estadio Hernando Siles, La Paz (H) | Uruguay | 0–0 | 2002 FIFA World Cup qualification | | 29,112 | |
| 302 | 26 January 2001 | Orange Bowl, Miami (N) | Jamaica | 0–3 | Friendly | | 8,791 | |
| 303 | 27 March 2001 | Estadio El Campín, Bogotá (A) | Colombia | 0–2 | 2002 FIFA World Cup qualification | | 29,998 | |
| 304 | 25 April 2001 | Estadio Hernando Siles, La Paz (H) | Argentina | 3–3 | 2002 FIFA World Cup qualification | Paz, Colque, Botero | 35,000 | |
| 305 | 3 June 2001 | Estadio Hernando Siles, La Paz (H) | Venezuela | 5–0 | 2002 FIFA World Cup qualification | Baldivieso (2), Botero (2), R. Justiniano | 25,000 | |
| 306 | 13 July 2001 | Atanasio Girardot Sports Complex, Medellín (N) | Uruguay | 0–1 | 2001 Copa América | | 38,000 | |
| 307 | 16 July 2001 | Atanasio Girardot Sports Complex, Medellín (N) | Honduras | 0–2 | 2001 Copa América | | 25,000 | |
| 308 | 19 July 2001 | Atanasio Girardot Sports Complex, Medellín (N) | Costa Rica | 0–4 | 2001 Copa América | | 25,000 | |
| 309 | 14 August 2001 | Estadio Nacional, Santiago (A) | Chile | 2–2 | 2002 FIFA World Cup qualification | Baldivieso, Coimbra | 34,657 | |
| 310 | 5 September 2001 | Estadio Defensores del Chaco, Asunción (A) | Paraguay | 1–5 | 2002 FIFA World Cup qualification | Paz | 25,000 | |
| 311 | 6 October 2001 | Estadio Hernando Siles, La Paz (H) | Ecuador | 1–5 | 2002 FIFA World Cup qualification | Galindo | 8,000 | |
| 312 | 7 November 2001 | Estadio Hernando Siles, La Paz (H) | Brazil | 3–1 | 2002 FIFA World Cup qualification | Paz, Baldivieso (2) | 32,574 | |
| 313 | 14 November 2001 | Estadio Monumental, Lima (A) | Peru | 1–1 | 2002 FIFA World Cup qualification | Castillo | 2,374 | |
| 314 | 31 January 2002 | Estádio Serra Dourada, Goiânia (A) | Brazil | 0–6 | Friendly | | 31,800 | |
| 315 | 13 February 2002 | Estadio Antonio Aranda, Ciudad del Este (A) | Paraguay | 2–2 | Friendly | Colque, Andaveris | 22,000 | |
| 316 | 27 March 2002 | Stade Léopold Sédar Senghor, Dakar (A) | Senegal | 1–2 | Friendly | Bengolea | 50,000 | |
| 317 | 16 May 2002 | Stanford Stadium, Stanford (N) | Mexico | 0–1 | Friendly | | 37,127 | |
| 318 | 21 August 2002 | Estadio Olímpico, Caracas (A) | Venezuela | 0–2 | Friendly | | 26,000 | |
| 319 | 19 March 2003 | Texas Stadium, Irving (N) | Mexico | 0–2 | Friendly | | 40,000 | |
| 320 | 10 June 2003 | Estádio Nacional, Lisbon (A) | Portugal | 0–4 | Friendly | | 10,000 | |
| 321 | 31 August 2003 | Estadio Hernando Siles, La Paz (H) | Panama | 3–0 | Friendly | Méndez, Ricaldi, Gutiérrez | 8,048 | |
| 322 | 7 September 2003 | Estadio Centenario, Montevideo (A) | Uruguay | 0–5 | 2006 FIFA World Cup qualification | | 39,253 | |
| 323 | 10 September 2003 | Estadio Hernando Siles, La Paz (H) | Colombia | 4–0 | 2006 FIFA World Cup qualification | Baldivieso, Botero (3) | 23,200 | |
| 324 | 11 October 2003 | Robert F. Kennedy Memorial Stadium, Washington, D.C. (N) | Honduras | 1–0 | Friendly | J. M. Peña | 20,000 | |
| 325 | 15 November 2003 | Estadio Monumental, Buenos Aires (A) | Argentina | 0–3 | 2006 FIFA World Cup qualification | | 30,042 | |
| 326 | 18 November 2003 | Estadio José Pachencho Romero, Maracaibo (A) | Venezuela | 1–2 | 2006 FIFA World Cup qualification | Botero | 30,000 | |
| 327 | 30 March 2004 | Estadio Hernando Siles, La Paz (H) | Chile | 0–2 | 2006 FIFA World Cup qualification | | 40,000 | |
| 328 | 1 June 2004 | Estadio Hernando Siles, La Paz (H) | Paraguay | 2–1 | 2006 FIFA World Cup qualification | Cristaldo, R. Suárez | 23,013 | |
| 329 | 5 June 2004 | Estadio Olímpico Atahualpa, Quito (A) | Ecuador | 2–3 | 2006 FIFA World Cup qualification | Gutiérrez, Castillo | 30,020 | |
| 330 | 6 July 2004 | Estadio Nacional, Lima (N) | Peru | 2–2 | 2004 Copa América | Botero, Álvarez | 45,000 | |
| 331 | 9 July 2004 | Estadio Nacional, Lima (N) | Colombia | 0–1 | 2004 Copa América | | 35,000 | |
| 332 | 12 July 2004 | Estadio Mansiche, Trujillo (N) | Venezuela | 1–1 | 2004 Copa América | Galindo | 25,000 | |
| 333 | 5 September 2004 | Estádio do Morumbi, São Paulo (A) | Brazil | 1–3 | 2006 FIFA World Cup qualification | Cristaldo | 60,000 | |
| 334 | 9 October 2004 | Estadio Hernando Siles, La Paz (H) | Peru | 1–0 | 2006 FIFA World Cup qualification | Botero | 23,729 | |
| 335 | 12 October 2004 | Estadio Hernando Siles, La Paz (H) | Uruguay | 0–0 | 2006 FIFA World Cup qualification | | 24,394 | |
| 336 | 13 November 2004 | Robert F. Kennedy Memorial Stadium, Washington, D.C. (N) | Guatemala | 0–1 | Friendly | | 22,000 | |
| 337 | 17 November 2004 | Estadio Metropolitano, Barranquilla (A) | Colombia | 0–1 | 2006 FIFA World Cup qualification | | 25,000 | |
| 338 | 26 March 2005 | Estadio Hernando Siles, La Paz (H) | Argentina | 1–2 | 2006 FIFA World Cup qualification | Castillo | 25,000 | |
| 339 | 29 March 2005 | Estadio Hernando Siles, La Paz (H) | Venezuela | 3–1 | 2006 FIFA World Cup qualification | A. Cichero (o.g.), Castillo, J. Vaca | 7,908 | |
| 340 | 4 June 2005 | Estadio Nacional, Santiago (A) | Chile | 1–3 | 2006 FIFA World Cup qualification | Castillo | 46,729 | |
| 341 | 8 June 2005 | Estadio Defensores del Chaco, Asunción (A) | Paraguay | 1–4 | 2006 FIFA World Cup qualification | Galindo | 5,534 | |
| 342 | 3 September 2005 | Estadio Hernando Siles, La Paz (H) | Ecuador | 1–2 | 2006 FIFA World Cup qualification | D. Vaca | 8,434 | |
| 343 | 9 October 2005 | Estadio Hernando Siles, La Paz (H) | Brazil | 1–1 | 2006 FIFA World Cup qualification | Castillo | 22,725 | |
| 344 | 12 October 2005 | Estadio Modelo, Tacna (A) | Peru | 1–4 | 2006 FIFA World Cup qualification | Gutiérrez | 14,774 | |
| 345 | 15 November 2006 | Estadio Hernando Siles, La Paz (H) | El Salvador | 5–1 | Friendly | Sossa, Arce, Ó. Sánchez, Reyes, D. Peña | 23,000 | |
| 346 | 28 March 2007 | Ellis Park Stadium, Johannesburg (A) | South Africa | 1–0 | Friendly | J. Vaca | 5,000 | |
| 347 | 26 May 2007 | Gillette Stadium, Foxborough (N) | Republic of Ireland | 1–1 | Friendly | Hoyos | 10,000 | |
| 348 | 20 June 2007 | Estadio Ramón Tahuichi Aguilera, Santa Cruz de la Sierra (H) | Paraguay | 0–0 | Friendly | | 35,000 | |
| 349 | 26 June 2007 | Estadio Polideportivo de Pueblo Nuevo, San Cristóbal (N) | Venezuela | 2–2 | 2007 Copa América | A. Cichero (o.g.), Arce | 42,000 | |
| 350 | 30 June 2007 | Estadio Polideportivo de Pueblo Nuevo, San Cristóbal (N) | Uruguay | 0–1 | 2007 Copa América | | 18,000 | |
| 351 | 3 July 2007 | Estadio Metropolitano, Mérida (N) | Peru | 2–2 | 2007 Copa América | Moreno, Campos | 35,000 | |
| 352 | 22 August 2007 | Estadio Olímpico Atahualpa, Quito (A) | Ecuador | 0–1 | Friendly | | 20,000 | |
| 353 | 12 September 2007 | Estadio Monumental, Lima (A) | Peru | 0–2 | Friendly | | 15,000 | |
| 354 | 13 October 2007 | Estadio Centenario, Montevideo (A) | Uruguay | 0–5 | 2010 FIFA World Cup qualification | | 25,200 | |
| 355 | 17 October 2007 | Estadio Hernando Siles, La Paz (H) | Colombia | 0–0 | 2010 FIFA World Cup qualification | | 19,469 | |
| 356 | 17 November 2007 | Estadio Monumental, Buenos Aires (A) | Argentina | 0–3 | 2010 FIFA World Cup qualification | | 43,308 | |
| 357 | 20 November 2007 | Estadio Polideportivo de Pueblo Nuevo, San Cristóbal (A) | Venezuela | 3–5 | 2010 FIFA World Cup qualification | Martins (2), Arce | 18,632 | |
| 358 | 6 February 2008 | Estadio Hernando Siles, La Paz (H) | Peru | 2–1 | Friendly | Padriel, Reyes | 35,000 | |
| 359 | 26 March 2008 | Estadio José Antonio Anzoátegui, Puerto la Cruz (A) | Venezuela | 1–0 | Friendly | G. Cichero (o.g.) | 16,000 | |
| 360 | 15 June 2008 | Estadio Hernando Siles, La Paz (H) | Chile | 0–2 | 2010 FIFA World Cup qualification | | 27,722 | |
| 361 | 18 June 2008 | Estadio Hernando Siles, La Paz (H) | Paraguay | 4–2 | 2010 FIFA World Cup qualification | Botero (2), García, Martins | 8,561 | |
| 362 | 6 August 2008 | Robert F. Kennedy Memorial Stadium, Washington, D.C. (N) | Guatemala | 0–3 | Friendly | | 15,000 | |
| 363 | 20 August 2008 | Estadio Ramón Tahuichi Aguilera, Santa Cruz de la Sierra (H) | Panama | 1–0 | Friendly | Cabrera | 20,000 | |
| 364 | 6 September 2008 | Estadio Olímpico Atahualpa, Quito (A) | Ecuador | 1–3 | 2010 FIFA World Cup qualification | Botero | 35,000 | |
| 365 | 10 September 2008 | Estádio Olímpico João Havelange, Rio de Janeiro (A) | Brazil | 0–0 | 2010 FIFA World Cup qualification | | 31,422 | |
| 366 | 11 October 2008 | Estadio Hernando Siles, La Paz (H) | Peru | 3–0 | 2010 FIFA World Cup qualification | Botero (2), García | 23,147 | |
| 367 | 14 October 2008 | Estadio Hernando Siles, La Paz (H) | Uruguay | 2–2 | 2010 FIFA World Cup qualification | Martins | 21,075 | |
| 368 | 22 October 2008 | Robert F. Kennedy Memorial Stadium, Washington, D.C. (N) | El Salvador | 0–2 | Friendly | | 12,000 | |
| 369 | 11 March 2009 | Dick's Sporting Goods Park, Commerce City (N) | Mexico | 1–5 | Friendly | Torrico | 35,000 | |
| 370 | 28 March 2009 | Estadio El Campín, Bogotá (A) | Colombia | 0–2 | 2010 FIFA World Cup qualification | | 22,044 | |
| 371 | 1 April 2009 | Estadio Hernando Siles, La Paz (H) | Argentina | 6–1 | 2010 FIFA World Cup qualification | Martins, Botero (3), Da Rosa, Torrico | 30,487 | |
| 372 | 6 June 2009 | Estadio Hernando Siles, La Paz (H) | Venezuela | 0–1 | 2010 FIFA World Cup qualification | | 23,427 | |
| 373 | 10 June 2009 | Estadio Nacional, Santiago (A) | Chile | 0–4 | 2010 FIFA World Cup qualification | | 60,214 | |
| 374 | 5 September 2009 | Estadio Defensores del Chaco, Asunción (A) | Paraguay | 0–1 | 2010 FIFA World Cup qualification | | 25,094 | |
| 375 | 9 September 2009 | Estadio Hernando Siles, La Paz (H) | Ecuador | 1–3 | 2010 FIFA World Cup qualification | Yecerotte | 10,200 | |
| 376 | 11 October 2009 | Estadio Hernando Siles, La Paz (H) | Brazil | 2–1 | 2010 FIFA World Cup qualification | Olivares, Martins | 16,557 | |
| 377 | 14 October 2009 | Estadio Alejandro Villanueva, Lima (A) | Peru | 0–1 | 2010 FIFA World Cup qualification | | 4,373 | |
| 378 | 25 February 2010 | Candlestick Park, San Francisco (A) | Mexico | 0–5 | Friendly | | 20,000 | |
| 379 | 11 August 2010 | Estadio Hernando Siles, La Paz (H) | Colombia | 1–1 | Friendly | Galindo | 4,000 | |
| 380 | 7 October 2010 | Estadio Ramón Tahuichi Aguilera, Santa Cruz de la Sierra (H) | Venezuela | 1–3 | Friendly | Martins | — | |
| 381 | 25 March 2011 | Estadio Rommel Fernández, Panama City (A) | Panama | 0–2 | Friendly | | — | |
| 382 | 28 March 2011 | Estadio Carlos Salazar Hijo, Mazatenago (A) | Guatemala | 1–1 | Friendly | Pedriel | — | |
| 383 | 4 June 2011 | Estadio Ramón Tahuichi Aguilera, Santa Cruz de la Sierra (H) | Paraguay | 0–2 | Friendly | | — | |
| 384 | 7 June 2011 | Estadio Feliciano Cáceres, Luque (A) | Paraguay | 0–0 | Friendly | | — | |
| 385 | 1 July 2011 | Estadio Ciudad de La Plata, La Plata (N) | Argentina | 1–1 | 2011 Copa América | Edivaldo | 52,700 | |
| 386 | 7 July 2011 | Estadio 23 de Agosto, San Salvador de Jujuy (N) | Costa Rica | 0–2 | 2011 Copa América | | 23,000 | |
| 387 | 10 July 2011 | Estadio Brigadier General Estanislao López, Santa Fe | Colombia | 0–2 | 2011 Copa América | | 12,000 | |
| 388 | 10 August 2011 | Estadio Ramón Tahuichi Aguilera, Santa Cruz de la Sierra (H) | Panama | 1–3 | Friendly | Arce | — | |
| 389 | 2 September 2011 | Estadio Nacional, Lima (A) | Peru | 2–2 | Friendly | Escobar, Cardozo | — | |
| 390 | 5 September 2011 | Estadio Hernando Siles, La Paz (H) | Peru | 0–0 | Friendly | | — | |
| 391 | 7 October 2011 | Estadio Centenario, Montevideo (A) | Uruguay | 2–4 | 2014 FIFA World Cup qualification | Cardozo, Martins | 25,500 | |
| 392 | 11 October 2011 | Estadio Hernando Siles, La Paz (H) | Colombia | 1–2 | 2014 FIFA World Cup qualification | Flores | 33,155 | |
| 393 | 11 November 2011 | Estadio Monumental, Buenos Aires (A) | Argentina | 1–1 | 2014 FIFA World Cup qualification | Martins | 27,592 | |
| 394 | 15 November 2011 | Estadio Polideportivo de Pueblo Nuevo, San Cristóbal (A) | Venezuela | 0–1 | 2014 FIFA World Cup qualification | | 33,351 | |
| 395 | 29 February 2012 | Estadio Hernando Siles, La Paz (H) | Cuba | 1–0 | Friendly | Pedriel | — | |
| 396 | 2 June 2012 | Estadio Hernando Siles, La Paz (H) | Chile | 0–2 | 2014 FIFA World Cup qualification | | 34,389 | |
| 397 | 9 June 2012 | Estadio Hernando Siles, La Paz (H) | Paraguay | 3–1 | 2014 FIFA World Cup qualification | A. Peña, Escobar | 17,320 | |
| 398 | 15 August 2012 | Estadio Ramón Tahuichi Aguilera, Santa Cruz de la Sierra (H) | Guyana | 2–0 | Friendly | Mojica, M. Suárez | — | |
| 399 | 7 September 2012 | Estadio Olímpico Atahualpa, Quito (A) | Ecuador | 0–1 | 2014 FIFA World Cup qualification | | — | |
| 400 | 12 October 2012 | Estadio Hernando Siles, La Paz (H) | Peru | 1–1 | 2014 FIFA World Cup qualification | Chumacero | 46,500 | |
| 401 | 16 October 2012 | Estadio Hernando Siles, La Paz (H) | Uruguay | 4–1 | 2014 FIFA World Cup qualification | Saucedo (3), Mojica | 25,402 | |
| 402 | 14 November 2012 | Estadio Ramón Tahuichi Aguilera, Santa Cruz de la Sierra (H) | Costa Rica | 1–1 | Friendly | Saucedo | — | |
| 403 | 6 February 2013 | Estadio Ramón Tahuichi Aguilera, Santa Cruz de la Sierra (H) | Haiti | 2–1 | Friendly | Saucedo, Mojica | — | |
| 404 | 22 March 2013 | Estadio Metropolitano, Barranquilla (A) | Colombia | 0–5 | 2014 FIFA World Cup qualification | | 40,478 | |
| 405 | 26 March 2013 | Estadio Hernando Siles, La Paz (H) | Argentina | 1–1 | 2014 FIFA World Cup qualification | Martins | 35,000 | |
| 406 | 6 April 2013 | Estadio Ramón Tahuichi Aguilera, Santa Cruz de la Sierra (H) | Brazil | 0–4 | Friendly | | 35,000 | |
| 407 | 7 June 2013 | Estadio Hernando Siles, La Paz (H) | Venezuela | 1–1 | 2014 FIFA World Cup qualification | Campos | 10,155 | |
| 408 | 11 June 2013 | Estadio Nacional, Santiago (A) | Chile | 1–3 | 2014 FIFA World Cup qualification | Martins | 45,000 | |
| 409 | 14 August 2013 | Estadio Polideportivo de Pueblo Nuevo, San Cristóbal (A) | Venezuela | 2–2 | Friendly | Cardozo, Chávez | — | |
| 410 | 6 September 2013 | Estadio Defensores del Chaco, Asunción (A) | Paraguay | 0–4 | 2014 FIFA World Cup qualification | | 20,000 | |
| 411 | 10 September 2013 | Estadio Hernando Siles, La Paz (H) | Ecuador | 1–1 | 2014 FIFA World Cup qualification | Arrascaita | 12,043 | |
| 412 | 15 October 2013 | Estadio Nacional, Lima (A) | Peru | 1–1 | 2014 FIFA World Cup qualification | Bejarano | 0 | |
| 413 | 30 May 2014 | Ramón Sánchez Pizjuán Stadium, Seville (A) | Spain | 0–2 | Friendly | | 35,000 | |
| 414 | 6 June 2014 | Red Bull Arena, Harrison (N) | Greece | 1–2 | Friendly | Cardozo | — | |
| 415 | 6 September 2014 | Lockhart Stadium, Fort Lauderdale (N) | Ecuador | 0–4 | Friendly | | 10,000 | |
| 416 | 9 September 2014 | Dick's Sporting Goods Park, Commerce City (N) | Mexico | 0–1 | Friendly | | 18,136 | |
| 417 | 14 October 2014 | Estadio Regional de Antofagasta, Antofagasta (A) | Chile | 2–2 | Friendly | Saucedo (2) | — | |
| 418 | 18 November 2014 | Estadio Hernando Siles, La Paz (H) | Venezuela | 3–2 | Friendly | Raldes, Lizio, Arce | — | |
| 419 | 6 June 2015 | Estadio San Juan del Bicentenario, San Juan (A) | Argentina | 0–5 | Friendly | | 18,000 | |
| 420 | 12 June 2015 | Estadio Sausalito, Viña del Mar (N) | Mexico | 0–0 | 2015 Copa América | | 14,987 | |
| 421 | 15 June 2015 | Estadio Elías Figueroa Brander, Valparaíso (N) | Ecuador | 3–2 | 2015 Copa América | Raldes, Smedberg-Dalence, Martins | 5,982 | |
| 422 | 19 June 2015 | Estadio Nacional, Santiago (N) | Chile | 0–5 | 2015 Copa América | | 45,601 | |
| 423 | 25 June 2015 | Estadio Municipal Germán Becker, Temuco (N) | Peru | 1–3 | 2015 Copa América | Martins | 16,872 | |
| 424 | 4 September 2015 | BBVA Stadium, Houston (N) | Argentina | 0–7 | Friendly | | — | |
| 425 | 8 October 2015 | Estadio Hernando Siles, La Paz (H) | Uruguay | 0–2 | 2018 FIFA World Cup qualification | | 36,000 | |
| 426 | 13 October 2015 | Estadio Olímpico Atahualpa, Quito (A) | Ecuador | 0–2 | 2018 FIFA World Cup qualification | | 27,333 | |
| 427 | 12 November 2015 | Estadio Hernando Siles, La Paz (H) | Venezuela | 4–2 | 2018 FIFA World Cup qualification | Ramallo (2), Arce, Cardozo | 30,923 | |
| 428 | 17 November 2015 | Estadio Defensores del Chaco, Asunción (A) | Paraguay | 1–2 | 2018 FIFA World Cup qualification | Duk | 35,850 | |
| 429 | 24 March 2016 | Estadio Hernando Siles, La Paz (H) | Colombia | 2–3 | 2018 FIFA World Cup qualification | Arce, Chumacero | 26,765 | |
| 430 | 29 March 2016 | Estadio Mario Alberto Kempes, Córdoba (A) | Argentina | 0–2 | 2018 FIFA World Cup qualification | | 53,000 | |
| 431 | 28 May 2016 | Children's Mercy Park, Kansas City (A) | United States | 0–4 | Friendly | | 8,894 | |
| 432 | 6 June 2016 | Camping World Stadium, Orlando (N) | Panama | 1–2 | Copa América Centenario | Arce | 13,466 | |
| 433 | 10 June 2016 | Gillette Stadium, Foxborough (N) | Chile | 1–2 | Copa América Centenario | Campos | 19,392 | |
| 434 | 14 June 2016 | CenturyLink Field, Seattle (N) | Argentina | 0–3 | Copa América Centenario | | 45,753 | |
| 435 | 1 September 2016 | Estadio Hernando Siles, La Paz (H) | Peru | 0–3 | 2018 FIFA World Cup qualification | Escobar, Raldes | 26,765 | |
| 436 | 6 September 2016 | Estadio Monumental, Santiago (A) | Chile | 0–3 | 2018 FIFA World Cup qualification | | 40,000 | |
| 437 | 6 October 2016 | Arena das Dunas, Natal (A) | Brazil | 0–5 | 2018 FIFA World Cup qualification | | 40,013 | |
| 438 | 11 October 2016 | Estadio Hernando Siles, La Paz (H) | Ecuador | 2–2 | 2018 FIFA World Cup qualification | Escobar | 18,033 | |
| 439 | 10 November 2016 | Estadio Monumental, Maturín (A) | Venezuela | 0–5 | 2018 FIFA World Cup qualification | | 49,750 | |
| 440 | 15 November 2016 | Estadio Hernando Siles, La Paz (H) | Paraguay | 1–0 | 2018 FIFA World Cup qualification | Gómez (o.g.) | 13,285 | |
| 441 | 23 March 2017 | Estadio Metropolitano, Barranquilla (A) | Colombia | 0–1 | 2018 FIFA World Cup qualification | | 39,000 | |
| 442 | 28 March 2017 | Estadio Hernando Siles, La Paz (H) | Argentina | 2–0 | 2018 FIFA World Cup qualification | Arce, Martins | 29,943 | |
| 443 | 2 June 2017 | Nicaragua National Football Stadium, Managua (A) | Nicaragua | 1–0 | Friendly | Álvarez | — | |
| 444 | 7 June 2017 | Estadio Ovidio Messa Soruco, Yacuiba (H) | Nicaragua | 3–2 | Friendly | Bejarano, Álvarez, Vargas | — | |
| 445 | 31 August 2017 | Estadio Monumental, Lima (A) | Peru | 1–2 | 2018 FIFA World Cup qualification | Álvarez | 60,000 | |
| 446 | 5 September 2017 | Estadio Hernando Siles, La Paz (H) | Chile | 1–0 | 2018 FIFA World Cup qualification | Arce | 31,555 | |
| 447 | 5 October 2017 | Estadio Hernando Siles, La Paz (H) | Brazil | 0–0 | 2018 FIFA World Cup qualification | | 34,725 | |
| 448 | 10 October 2017 | Estadio Centenario, Montevideo (A) | Uruguay | 2–4 | 2018 FIFA World Cup qualification | Silva (o.g.), Godín (o.g.) | 60,000 | |
| 449 | 23 March 2018 | Ergilio Hato Stadium, Willemstad (A) | Curaçao | 1–1 | Friendly | Lachman (o.g.) | — | |
| 450 | 26 March 2018 | Ergilio Hato Stadium, Willemstad (A) | Curaçao | 0–1 | Friendly | | — | |
| 451 | 28 May 2018 | Subaru Park, Chester (A) | United States | 0–3 | Friendly | | 11,882 | |
| 452 | 7 June 2018 | Tivoli Stadion Tirol, Innsbruck (N) | South Korea | 0–0 | Friendly | | 500 | |
| 453 | 9 June 2018 | Liebenauer Stadium, Graz (N) | Serbia | 1–5 | Friendly | Campos | 1,572 | |
| 454 | 10 September 2018 | Prince Faisal bin Fahd Stadium, Riyadh (A) | Saudi Arabia | 2–2 | Friendly | Campos, Martins | 4,117 | |
| 455 | 13 October 2018 | Thuwunna Stadium, Yangon (A) | Myanmar | 3–0 | Friendly | Haquin, Martins, L. Vaca | 5,869 | |
| 456 | 16 October 2018 | Azadi Stadium, Tehran (A) | Iran | 1–2 | Friendly | Cardozo | 20,000 | |
| 457 | 16 November 2018 | Maktoum bin Rashid Al Maktoum Stadium, Dubai (A) | United Arab Emirates | 0–0 | Friendly | | — | |
| 458 | 20 November 2018 | Sheikh Khalifa International Stadium, Al Ain (N) | Iraq | 0–0 | Friendly | | — | |
| 459 | 3 March 2019 | Estadio Bicentenario de Villa Tunari, Villa Tunari (H) | Nicaragua | 2–2 | Friendly | R. Vaca, Quijano (o.g.) | — | |
| 460 | 22 March 2019 | Ulsan Munsu Football Stadium, Ulsan (A) | South Korea | 0–1 | Friendly | | 41,117 | |
| 461 | 26 March 2019 | Noevir Stadium Kobe, Hyōgo-ku (A) | Japan | 0–1 | Friendly | | — | |
| 462 | 2 June 2019 | Stade de la Beaujoire, Nantes (A) | France | 0–2 | Friendly | | 35,228 | |
| 463 | 14 June 2019 | Estádio do Morumbi, São Paulo (N) | Brazil | 0–3 | 2019 Copa América | | 47,260 | |
| 464 | 18 June 2019 | Maracanã Stadium, Rio de Janeiro (N) | Peru | 1–3 | 2019 Copa América | Martins | 26,346 | |
| 465 | 22 June 2019 | Mineirão, Belo Horizonte (N) | Venezuela | 1–3 | 2019 Copa América | L. Justiniano | 8,091 | |
| 466 | 10 September 2019 | Estadio Alejandro Serrano Aguilar, Cuenca (A) | Ecuador | 0–3 | Friendly | | — | |
| 467 | 10 October 2019 | Estadio Olímpico, Caracas (A) | Venezuela | 1–4 | Friendly | Álvarez | 20,112 | |
| 468 | 15 October 2019 | Estadio Ramón Tahuichi Aguilera, Santa Cruz de la Sierra (H) | Haiti | 3–1 | Friendly | Saavedra (2), Álvarez | — | |

Notes

1. A: Peru were ordered to play this match behind closed doors following "very serious" incidents involving supporters in their previous match.
2. B: Peru were awarded a technical 3–0 win after Bolivia fielded the ineligible player Nelson Cabrera. The match had originally finished 2–0 to Bolivia.
3. C: Chile were awarded a technical 3–0 win after Bolivia fielded the ineligible player Nelson Cabrera. The match had originally finished 0–0.

== Record by opponent ==
| Team | Pld | W | D | L | GF | GA | GD | WPCT |
|---|---|---|---|---|---|---|---|---|
| Argentina | 14 | 2 | 4 | 8 | 15 | 33 | −18 | 14.29 |
| Brazil | 11 | 2 | 3 | 6 | 7 | 29 | −22 | 18.18 |
| Chile | 13 | 2 | 2 | 9 | 9 | 30 | −21 | 15.38 |
| Colombia | 13 | 1 | 3 | 9 | 9 | 21 | −12 | 7.69 |
| Costa Rica | 3 | 0 | 1 | 2 | 1 | 7 | −6 | 0.00 |
| Cuba | 1 | 1 | 0 | 0 | 1 | 0 | +1 | 100.00 |
| Curaçao | 2 | 0 | 1 | 1 | 1 | 2 | −1 | 0.00 |
| Ecuador | 14 | 1 | 2 | 11 | 12 | 34 | −22 | 7.14 |
| El Salvador | 2 | 1 | 0 | 1 | 5 | 3 | +2 | 50.00 |
| France | 1 | 0 | 0 | 1 | 0 | 2 | −2 | 0.00 |
| Greece | 1 | 0 | 0 | 1 | 1 | 2 | −1 | 0.00 |
| Guatemala | 3 | 0 | 1 | 2 | 1 | 5 | −4 | 0.00 |
| Guyana | 1 | 1 | 0 | 0 | 2 | 0 | +2 | 100.00 |
| Haiti | 3 | 3 | 0 | 0 | 14 | 4 | +10 | 100.00 |
| Honduras | 2 | 1 | 0 | 1 | 1 | 2 | −1 | 50.00 |
| Iran | 1 | 0 | 0 | 1 | 1 | 2 | −1 | 0.00 |
| Iraq | 1 | 0 | 1 | 0 | 0 | 0 | 0 | 0.00 |
| Jamaica | 1 | 0 | 0 | 1 | 0 | 3 | −3 | 0.00 |
| Japan | 2 | 0 | 0 | 2 | 0 | 3 | −3 | 0.00 |
| Mexico | 7 | 0 | 1 | 6 | 1 | 15 | −14 | 0.00 |
| Myanmar | 1 | 1 | 0 | 0 | 3 | 0 | +3 | 100.00 |
| Nicaragua | 3 | 2 | 1 | 0 | 6 | 4 | +2 | 66.67 |
| Panama | 5 | 2 | 0 | 3 | 6 | 7 | −1 | 40.00 |
| Paraguay | 14 | 4 | 4 | 6 | 15 | 24 | −9 | 28.57 |
| Peru | 18 | 4 | 7 | 7 | 19 | 28 | −9 | 22.22 |
| Portugal | 1 | 0 | 0 | 1 | 0 | 4 | −4 | 0.00 |
| Republic of Ireland | 1 | 0 | 1 | 0 | 1 | 1 | 0 | 0.00 |
| Saudi Arabia | 1 | 0 | 1 | 0 | 2 | 2 | 0 | 0.00 |
| Senegal | 1 | 0 | 0 | 1 | 1 | 2 | −1 | 0.00 |
| Serbia | 1 | 0 | 0 | 1 | 1 | 5 | −4 | 0.00 |
| Slovakia | 1 | 0 | 0 | 1 | 0 | 2 | −2 | 0.00 |
| South Africa | 1 | 1 | 0 | 0 | 1 | 0 | +1 | 100.00 |
| South Korea | 2 | 0 | 1 | 1 | 0 | 1 | −1 | 0.00 |
| Spain | 1 | 0 | 0 | 1 | 0 | 2 | −2 | 0.00 |
| United Arab Emirates | 1 | 0 | 1 | 0 | 0 | 0 | 0 | 0.00 |
| United States | 2 | 0 | 0 | 2 | 0 | 7 | −7 | 0.00 |
| Uruguay | 12 | 1 | 3 | 8 | 10 | 26 | −16 | 8.33 |
| Venezuela | 20 | 5 | 5 | 10 | 31 | 41 | −10 | 25.00 |
| Total | 182 | 35 | 43 | 104 | 177 | 353 | −176 | 19.23 |

Source: Results
