= Leonardo Medina (Uruguayan footballer) =

Uruguayan footballer (born 1977)

Personal information
- Full name: Leonardo Andrés Medina Gutiérrez
- Date of birth: 30 October 1977 (age 49)
- Place of birth: Montevideo, Uruguay
- Height: 1.78 m (5 ft 10 in)
- Position: Striker

Senior career*
Years	Team	Apps	(Gls)
1998	Sud América		
1999–2000	Rentistas		
2002	Real Cartagena	12	(0)
2002–2003	Deportivo Colonia	27	(13)
2004–2006	Liverpool Montevideo	78	(32)
2006	Chiapas	11	(1)
2007	Audax Italiano	37	(17)
2008	Deportivo Pereira	21	(6)
2009	Huracán	8	(1)
2009	Oriente Petrolero	12	(4)
2010	Cienciano	5	(0)
2010–2011	Miramar Misiones	22	(8)
2011–2012	Cerro	7	(2)
2012–2015	Rampla Juniors		

Managerial career
- 2014–2015: Central Español (assistant)
- 2016–2017: Sud América (youth)
- 2017–2022: Liverpool Montevideo (youth)
- 2022: Miramar Misiones (youth)
- 2023–2024: Miramar Misiones
- * Club domestic league appearances and goals

Leonardo Andrés Medina Gutiérrez (born 30 May 1977) is a Uruguayan football manager and former player.

A striker, Medina played for clubs in his homeland of Uruguay, Colombia, Mexico and Chile, where he enjoyed success with Audax Italiano. He also played in the Argentine Primera for Huracán.

Medina participated in international club tournaments, Copa Libertadores 2007 and Copa Sudamericana 2007, where he made eight appearances and scored two goals, both with Audax Italiano.

== Club career ==
=== Oriente Petrolero ===
In July 2009, he joined Bolivian side Oriente Petrolero. On August 24, 2009, he got sent off together with Blooming defender Sergio Jáuregui, after a clash. While leaving the field, Jáuregui performed a running kick to Medina's face, knocking him unconscious. After a short spell with Oriente, he moved to Peruvian club Cienciano.

=== Cienciano ===
After a short spell with Oriente, he moved to Peru and joined Cienciano in January 2010. but left the club in July due to lack of playing time.
