= Augusto Andaveris =

Bolivian football striker (born 1979)

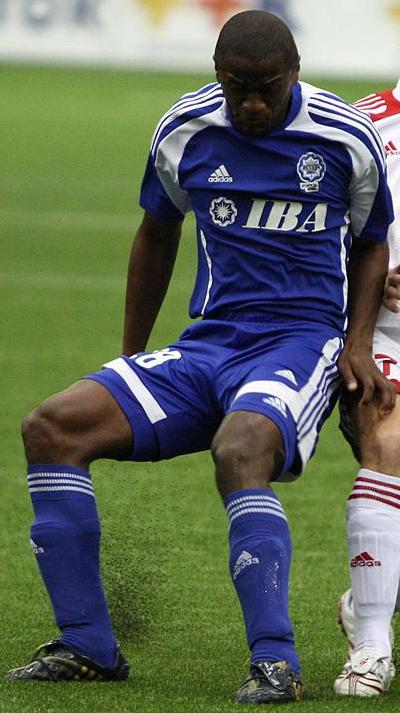
- Andaveris in 2009

Personal information
- Full name: Augusto Andaveris Iriondo
- Date of birth: May 5, 1979 (age 47)
- Place of birth: Chicaloma, Bolivia
- Height: 1.86 m (6 ft 1 in)
- Positions: Defender; forward; striker

Team information
- Current team: Always Ready
- Number: 19

Senior career*
Years	Team	Apps	(Gls)
1998–2000	Bolívar	4	(1)
2001	Iberoamericana	28	(15)
2002	Wilstermann	25	(5)
2003	San José	29	(14)
2004	Oriente Petrolero	32	(5)
2005	Bolívar	16	(5)
2005–2006	Tirana	17	(1)
2006–2008	La Paz	74	(30)
2008–2009	→ Inter Baku (loan)	15	(5)
2010–2011	Real Potosí	37	(14)
2011–2012	Aurora	45	(18)
2012–2015	Wilstermann	107	(20)
2015–2016	San José	41	(16)
2016–2017	Blooming	14	(1)
2017	Real Potosí	41	(7)
2018–	Always Ready	?	(?)

International career
2001–2012	Bolivia	21	(3)
- * Club domestic league appearances and goals as of 7 May 2018

Augusto Andaveris Iriondo (born 5 May 1979 in the Chicaloma, La Paz Department) is a Bolivian football striker who currently plays for Club Always Ready.

== Club career ==
Andaveris was one of the team leaders responsible for qualifying La Paz to the Copa Libertadores 2008. In March 2008, he was invited to try out with Shandong Luneng Taishan F.C. of China, which plays in the Chinese Super League. However, the parties were not able to agree on commercial terms. Therefore, Andaveris returned to La Paz F.C. in April 2008. After eighteen games in Apertura 2008 (of which Andaveris missed four games), Andaveris has scored ten goals. He has had four games in which he scored two goals in the same game.

His former clubs are Club Bolívar, Universidad Iberoamericana, Club Jorge Wilstermann, Club San José, Oriente Petrolero, Albanian club SK Tiranë, Inter Baku from Azerbaijan, as well as, a second spell at Club Bolívar.

== International career ==
Between 2001 and 2012, Andaveris has been capped for the Bolivia national team in twenty games with three goals scored.
