= Álvaro Ricaldi =

Bolivian footballer (born 1982)

Personal information
- Full name: Alvaro Ricaldi Alcócer
- Date of birth: April 28, 1982 (age 44)
- Place of birth: Cochabamba, Bolivia
- Height: 1.76 m (5 ft 9 1/2 in)
- Position: Defender

Senior career*
Years	Team	Apps	(Gls)
2003–2004	Wilstermann	65	(2)
2005	The Strongest	26	(0)
2006	Wilstermann	15	(0)
2006	Aurora	6	(0)
2007–2008	The Strongest	57	(1)
2009–2010	San José	28	(1)
2010	Real Potosí	16	(0)
2011–2012	La Paz	45	(1)
2012–2013	Real Potosí	23	(1)
2013–2014	Unión Maestranza		

International career
2003	Bolivia	4	(1)
- * Club domestic league appearances and goals as of July 31, 2009

Álvaro Ricaldi Alcócer (born April 28, 1982, in Cochabamba) is a Bolivian retired football defender.

== International career ==
Ricaldi made four appearances for the Bolivia national team in 2003, scoring one goal in a friendly match against Panama on August 31, 2003.

=== International goals ===
Scores and results list Bolivia's goal tally first.

No	Date	Venue	Opponent	Score	Result	Competition
1.	31 August 2003	Estadio Hernando Siles, La Paz, Bolivia	Panama	2–0	3–0	Friendly
