= Getulio Vaca =

Bolivian footballer (born 1984)

Personal information
- Full name: Getulio Joaquín Vaca Diez Parada
- Date of birth: 24 October 1984 (age 42)
- Place of birth: Santa Cruz de la Sierra, Bolivia
- Height: 1.80 m (5 ft 11 in)
- Position: Midfielder

Senior career*
Years	Team	Apps	(Gls)
- Guabirá
- Club Bolívar
- Blooming
2005	→ Yverdon-Sport (loan)	13	(0)
- Bolívar
- Blooming
- Guabirá
- Universitario de Sucre
- Real Mamoré

International career
2004	Bolivia	2	(0)
- * Club domestic league appearances and goals

Getulio Joaquín Vaca Diez Parada (born 24 October 1984) is a Bolivian former professional footballer who played as a midfielder. He made two appearances for the Bolivia national team in 2004. He was also part of Bolivia's squad for the 2004 Copa América tournament.

== Career ==
In summer 2005, Vaca Diez joined Swiss club Yverdon-Sport, newly promoted to the Swiss Super League, on loan.
