= Óscar Díaz (Colombian footballer) =

Colombian footballer (born 1972)

Personal information
- Full name: Óscar Díaz Asprilla
- Date of birth: June 8, 1972 (age 54)
- Place of birth: Riofrío, Colombia
- Height: 1.76 m (5 ft 9 in)
- Position: Midfielder

Senior career*
Years	Team	Apps	(Gls)
1994	Once Caldas		
1994–1996	Deportivo Pereira	32	(17)
1997	Once Caldas	34	(0)
1997	Deportivo Pereira	0	(0)
1998	Once Caldas	0	(0)
1999–2002	Cortuluá	133	(0)
2002	Millonarios FC	20	(0)
2003–2004	Deportivo Cali	47	(0)
2004	Deportivo Quito	12	(0)
2005	Deportivo Cali	15	(0)
2005	Deportivo Quito	16	(1)
2006	Deportivo Cali	7	(0)
2006	Deportes Quindío	8	(0)
2007–2008	Boyacá Chico	15	(0)
2008	Patriotas F.C.	?	(?)
2009–2010	Cortuluá	24	(0)

International career
2001–2005	Colombia	16	(1)
- * Club domestic league appearances and goals

Óscar Díaz Asprilla (born 8 June 1972) is a Colombian former footballer who played as a midfielder.

Déaz was part of the Colombia national football team at the 2003 FIFA Confederations Cup where he played in the match against Japan. He also won the 2001 Copa América with Colombia's national team.
