= Gilberto Angelucci =

Venezuelan footballer (born 1967)

Personal information
- Full name: Gilberto Angelucci Guión
- Date of birth: August 7, 1967 (age 59)
- Place of birth: Turén, Venezuela
- Height: 1.98 m (6 ft 6 in)
- Position: Goalkeeper

Senior career*
Years	Team	Apps	(Gls)
1985–1986	Portuguesa	48	(0)
1986–1988	Táchira	72	(0)
1988–1994	Minervén	130	(0)
1994–1998	San Lorenzo	29	(0)
1998–2003	Deportivo Táchira	110	(0)
1999–2000	→ Deportivo Italia (loan)	64	(0)
2003	Mineros	24	(0)
2004–2007	Maracaibo	119	(1)

International career^{‡}
1995–2005	Venezuela	47	(0)

Managerial career
- 2008: Maracaibo (caretaker)
- * Club domestic league appearances and goals as of 30 August 2015 ‡ National team caps and goals as of 30 August 2015

Gilberto Angelucci Guión (born 7 August 1967) is a retired Venezuelan football goalkeeper.

== Club career ==
Angelucci spent most of his career playing in Venezuela for a number of different teams. Between 1994 and 1998 he played in Argentina with San Lorenzo de Almagro. Afterwards he returned to Venezuelan football, he was part of the Maracaibo team that won the Primera División in 2004-05.

== International career ==
A Venezuelan international since 1995, Angelucci has been capped 47 times and included 1995 and 2004 Copa América squads.

== Honours ==
=== Club ===
San Lorenzo

- Torneo Apertura: 1995

UA Maracaibo

- Primera División: 2004–05
