= Riofrío, Valle del Cauca =

Coordinates: 4°09′22″N 76°17′16″W

Riofrío
- Municipality and town
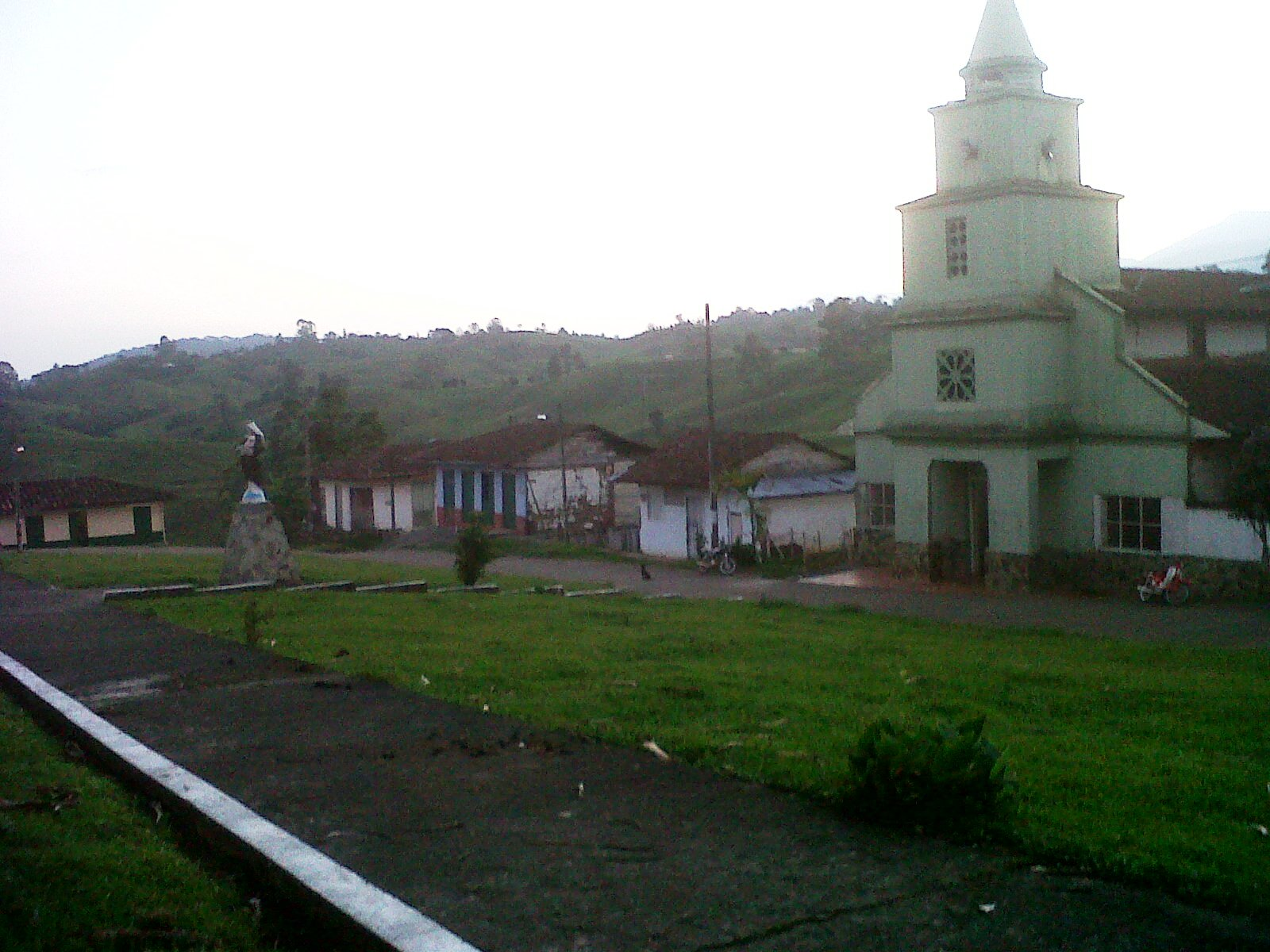

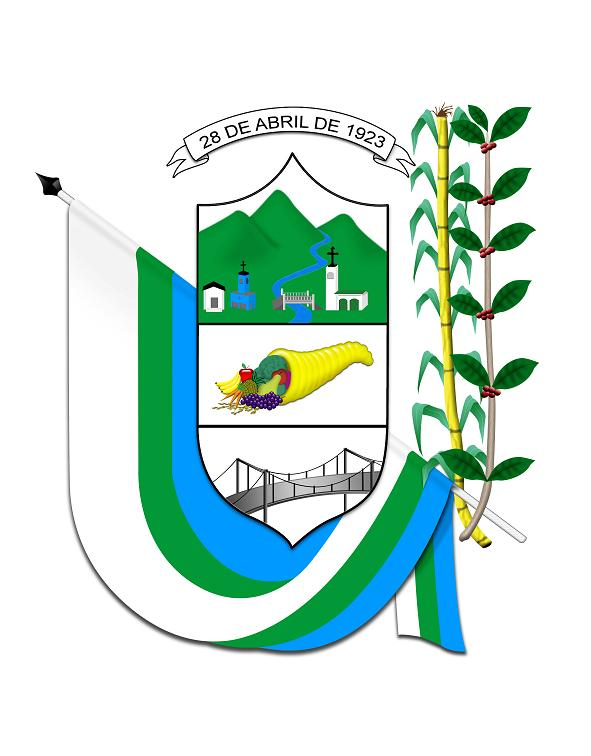
- Flag Coat of arms

- Location of the municipality and town of Riofrío in the Valle del Cauca Department of Colombia.
- Country: Colombia
- Department: Valle del Cauca Department

Area
  - Total: 280 km^{2} (110 sq mi)

Population (2015)
  - Total: 14,716
  - Density: 53/km^{2} (140/sq mi)
- Time zone: UTC-5 (Colombia Standard Time)

Riofrío (Spanish pronunciation: [rjoˈfɾi.o]) is a town and municipality located in the Department of Valle del Cauca, Colombia.
