= Miguel Mercado =

Bolivian footballer (born 1975)

Personal information
- Full name: Miguel Ángel Mercado Melgar
- Date of birth: 30 August 1975 (age 51)
- Place of birth: Santa Cruz de la Sierra, Bolivia
- Height: 1.73 m (5 ft 8 in)
- Positions: Striker; right midfielder

Team information
- Current team: Universitario de Pando (manager)

Youth career
- 1989–1994: Tahuichi Academy

Senior career*
Years	Team	Apps	(Gls)
1995–2006	Bolívar	305	(99)
2006–2007	San José	21	(4)
2007	Wilstermann	4	(0)
2008	The Strongest	12	(3)
Total		342	(106)

International career
1995–2004	Bolivia	12	(1)

Managerial career
- 2013–2014: Universitario de Pando
- 2022: Mariscal Sucre
- 2023–: Universitario de Pando
- * Club domestic league appearances and goals

Miguel Ángel Mercado Melgar (born 30 August 1975) is a Bolivian football manager and former player who played as a striker. He is the current manager of Universitario de Pando.

== Club career ==
Mercado was born in Santa Cruz de la Sierra. He emerged from the respected youth football academy Tahuichi. His first club at professional level was Bolívar, team for which he played for nearly twelve seasons with over 300 appearances. He also had short stints with San José, Wilstermann and the last club prior to his retirement, The Strongest.

Among his achievements, he was named the league topscorer in the 2003 Clausura tournament with 18 goals.

== International career ==
Between 1995 and 2004, Mercado earned a total of 12 caps with the Bolivia national team and scored his only goal against Chile during Copa America 1995. He had also participated Copa America 2004, as starting right midfielder and represented his country in 2 FIFA World Cup qualification matches.

== Honours ==
Bolívar

- Liga de Fútbol Profesional Boliviano: 1996, 1997, 2002, 2004 (A), 2005 (AD)

Individual

- Liga de Fútbol Profesional Boliviano: 2003 (C) topscorer (18 goals)
