= 2004–05 in Venezuelan football =

The following article presents a summary of the 2004-05 football season in Venezuela.

== Torneo Apertura ("Opening" Tournament) ==
Position	Team	Points	Played	Won	Drawn	Lost	For	Against	Difference
1	U.A. Maracaibo	34	18	9	7	2	27	12	+15
2	Caracas F.C.	32	18	9	5	4	23	19	+4
3	Mineros de Guayana	30	18	8	6	4	28	18	+10
4	Deportivo Táchira F.C.	30	18	9	3	6	23	19	+4
5	Trujillanos F.C.	29	18	8	5	5	21	16	+5
6	Carabobo F.C.	21	18	4	9	5	23	25	-2
7	Monagas S.C.	19	18	5	4	9	21	27	-6
8	Estudiantes de Mérida F.C.	17	18	4	5	9	24	31	-7
9	C.D. Italmaracaibo	17	18	4	5	9	18	30	-12
10	Deportivo Italchacao	14	18	3	5	10	22	33	-11

== Torneo Clausura ("Closing" Tournament) ==
Position	Team	Points	Played	Won	Drawn	Lost	For	Against	Difference
1	U.A. Maracaibo	39	18	12	3	3	30	12	+18
2	Caracas F.C.	33	18	9	6	3	28	14	+14
3	Deportivo Táchira F.C.	32	18	9	5	4	25	20	+5
4	Estudiantes de Mérida F.C.	25	18	6	7	5	18	19	-1
5	Monagas S.C.	23	18	6	5	7	26	36	-10
6	Mineros de Guayana	21	18	5	6	7	22	23	-1
7	Carabobo F.C.	21	18	4	9	5	21	22	-1
8	C.D. Italmaracaibo	17	18	4	5	9	19	26	-7
9	Trujillanos F.C.	17	18	4	5	9	21	29	-8
10	Deportivo Italchacao	13	18	2	7	9	20	29	-9

== Aggregate Table ==
Position	Team	Points	Played	Won	Drawn	Lost	For	Against	Difference	Notes
1.	U.A. Maracaibo	73	36	21	10	5	57	24	+33	Copa Libertadores 2006
2.	Caracas F.C.	65	36	18	11	7	51	33	+18	Copa Libertadores 2006
3.	Deportivo Táchira F.C.	62	36	18	8	10	48	39	+9	Pre-Libertadores 2006
4.	Mineros de Guayana	51	36	13	12	11	50	41	+9	Copa Sudamericana 2005
5.	Trujillanos F.C.	46	36	12	10	14	42	45	-3	Copa Sudamericana 2005
6.	Carabobo F.C.	42	36	8	18	10	44	47	-3
7.	Estudiantes de Mérida F.C.	42	36	10	12	14	42	50	-8
8.	Monagas S.C.	42	36	11	9	16	47	63	-16
9.	C.D. Italmaracaibo	34	36	8	10	18	37	56	-19	Relegation Playoff
10.	Deportivo Italchacao	27	36	5	12	19	42	62	-20	Relegated

Primera División Venezolana 2004-05 Winners
Unión Atlético Maracaibo
1st Title

== Venezuela national team ==
Date	Venue	Opponents	Score	Comp	Venezuela scorers	Match Report(s)	Fixture
August 18, 2004	Estadio Gran Canaria; Las Palmas, Spain	Spain	3 - 2	F	R.Castellín, J.Rojas		219
September 5, 2004	Estadio Defensores del Chaco; Asunción, Paraguay	Paraguay	1 - 0	WCQ06		Report	220
October 9, 2004	Estadio José Pachencho Romero; Maracaibo, Venezuela	Brazil	2 - 5	WCQ06	R.Morán 79' 90'	Report	221
October 14, 2004	Estadio Pueblo Nuevo; San Cristóbal, Venezuela	Ecuador	3 - 1	WCQ06	G.Urdaneta 20' (pen.); R.Morán 72' 80'	Report	222
November 17, 2004	El Monumental; Buenos Aires, Argentina	Argentina	3 - 2	WCQ06	R.Morán 31'; L.Vielma 72'	Report	223

- KEY:
  - F = Friendly match
  - CA04 = Copa América 2004 match
  - WCQ06 = World Cup Qualification 2006 match - South America
