= Massimo Margiotta =

Italian-Venezuelan footballer (born 1977)

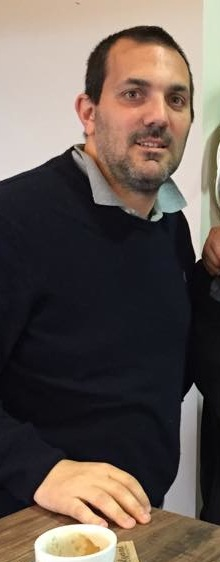
- Massimo Margiotta in 2015

Personal information
- Date of birth: 27 July 1977 (age 49)
- Place of birth: Maracaibo, Venezuela
- Height: 1.88 m (6 ft 2 in)
- Position: Forward

Team information
- Current team: Roma (academy director)

Youth career
- –1994: Pescara

Senior career*
Years	Team	Apps	(Gls)
1994–1997	Pescara	42	(7)
1997–1998	Cosenza	33	(19)
1998	Lecce	19	(7)
1999	Reggiana	18	(10)
1999–2001	Udinese	35	(6)
2001–2006	Vicenza	107	(47)
2003–2004	→ Perugia (loan)	16	(4)
2005–2006	→ Piacenza (loan)	34	(4)
2006–2008	Frosinone	56	(12)
2008–2010	Vicenza	58	(5)
2010–2011	Barletta	18	(1)
Total		436	(122)

International career
1995	Italy U18	4	(2)
1998–2000	Italy U21	8	(1)
2000	Italy Olympic	4	(0)
2004–2005	Venezuela	11	(2)

Managerial career
- 2017–2026: Hellas Verona (youth center manager)
- 2026–: Roma (academy director)
- * Club domestic league appearances and goals

Massimo Margiotta (born 27 July 1977) is an Italian-Venezuelan former professional footballer who played as a forward, currently working as Academy Director of Roma.

== Club career ==
=== Vicenza ===
Margiotta was signed by Vicenza in a co-ownership deal with Udinese in mid-2001. In June 2002 Margiotta was bought outright by the Veneto club. In August 2003 he was loaned to Perugia but returned in January 2004. In August 2005 he left for Piacenza.

=== Frosinone ===
In July 2006 he left for Frosinone initially on a temporary deal. In summer 2007 Margiotta joined the Lazio-based club outright for €50,000.

Margiotta admitted to being involved in a football gambling controversy in June 2007. He was suspended for four months, had to serve community service and pay a fine of €10,000.

=== Return to Vicenza ===
On 21 August 2008, Margiotta returned to Vicenza.

=== Barletta ===
In September 2010, he left for Barletta on a free transfer, and signed an annual contract. He was immediately included in starting XI, partnered with Giuseppe Caccavallo and Nicola Bellomo in a 4–3–2–1 formation. Coach Arcangelo Sciannimanico putted the original starter Paolo Carbonaro and Saveriano Infantino on the bench. Margiotta scored a late goal for Barletta after Foggia scored its second goal.

== International career ==
Born in Venezuela, Margiotta played for Italy at youth level and at Football at the 2000 Summer Olympics. In 2004 FIFA changed its rules to allow a footballer to switch nation if he had multi-nationality. Originally aimed at players under the age of 21, that year allowed all players to apply. Margiotta switched to Venezuela as he might have no chance to play for Italy. He collected 11 caps, four of which were friendlies.

== Post-retirement ==
Since he retired in 2011, Margiotta became a staff of Vicenza youth system, as Responsabili dell'Attività di Base from 2011–12 season to 2013–14 season (along with Alberto Ciarelli), In the 2014–15 season he replaced Stefano Umbro as Responsabile Attività Agonistica.

In July 2015, Margiotta (for two months), Dario Cassingena, Antonio Mandato and coach Mauro Carretta were sanctioned by Italian Football Federation (FIGC) due to a transfer irregularity in the signing of youth player Domenico Ranalletta.

On 1 July 2017, he took over as the new youth system chief of Hellas Verona. On 20 October 2022, Margiotta extended his contract with Hellas Verona until 2027.

== Career statistics ==
=== International ===
Venezuela
Year	Apps	Goals
2004	9	1
2005	2	1
Total	11	2

Scores and results list Venezuela's goal tally first, score column indicates score after each Margiotta goal.

International goals by date, venue, opponent, score, result and competition
Goal	Date	Venue	Opponent	Score	Result	Competition
1	9 February 2004	Estadio José Pachencho Romero, Maracaibo, Venezuela	Estonia	2–0	3–0	Friendly
2	9 July 2004	Estadio Monumental "U", Lima, Peru	Peru	1–3	1–3	2004 Copa América

== Honours ==
Udinese

- Serie C1: 1997-98

Udinese

- UEFA Intertoto Cup: 2000

Individual

- Serie C1 top scorer: 1997-98 (19 goals)
