= Límbert Pizarro =

Bolivian footballer (born 1976)

Personal information
- Full name: Límbert Percy Pizarro Vaca
- Date of birth: July 17, 1976 (age 50)
- Place of birth: Santa Cruz de la Sierra, Bolivia
- Height: 1.78 m (5 ft 10 in)
- Position: Midfielder

Senior career*
| Years | Team | Apps | (Gls) |
| 1995–2006 | Bolívar | 285 | (12) |
| 2005 | → Tiro Federal (loan) | 3 | (0) |
| 2006–2011 | San José | 153 | (1) |

International career^{‡}
| 2004–2007 | Bolivia | 9 | (0) |
- * Club domestic league appearances and goals as of September 17, 2009 ‡ National team caps and goals as of November 3, 2007

Límbert Percy Pizarro Vaca (born July 17, 1976, in Santa Cruz de la Sierra) is a Bolivian retired football midfielder.

== Club career ==
Pizarro began playing professionally with traditional club Bolívar, where he spent ten years of his career. During the winter of 2005 he was loaned to Argentine team Tiro Federal, but returned to his club of origin after a spell nearly unnoticed in the Argentine First Division. In 2006, he transferred to San José and began playing consistently again.

== International career ==
Between 2004 and 2007, Pizarro was capped in the Bolivia national team in 9 games. He represented his country in 4 FIFA World Cup qualification matches.

== Honours ==
| Season | Club | Title |
|---|---|---|
| 1996 | Bolívar | Liga de Fútbol Profesional Boliviano |
| 1997 | Bolívar | Liga de Fútbol Profesional Boliviano |
| 2002 | Bolívar | Liga de Fútbol Profesional Boliviano |
| 2004 (A) | Bolívar | Liga de Fútbol Profesional Boliviano |
| 2007 (C) | San José | Liga de Fútbol Profesional Boliviano |
