= Sergio Jáuregui =

Bolivian footballer (born 1985)

Personal information
- Full name: Sergio Antonio Jáuregui Landivar
- Date of birth: March 13, 1985 (age 41)
- Place of birth: Santa Cruz de la Sierra, Bolivia
- Height: 1.81 m (5 ft 11 in)
- Position: Defender

Senior career*
Years	Team	Apps	(Gls)
2002–2005	Blooming	85	(0)
2005–2006	→ Yverdon-Sport (loan)	3	(0)
2006	→ The Strongest (loan)	13	(1)
2007–2010	Blooming	116	(0)
2011	San José	37	(0)

International career
2004–2005	Bolivia	13	(0)
- * Club domestic league appearances and goals

Sergio Antonio Jáuregui Landivar (born March 13, 1985) is a former Bolivian professional footballer who played as a defender.

== Club career ==
Jáuregui was born in Santa Cruz de la Sierra. He began playing professionally for Blooming in 2002. His good form with club and national team rewarded him with a transfer to Swiss team Yverdon-Sport FC in the second semester of 2005 on a loan; however, he did not overcome the adaptation process and returned to Bolivia the following year, after making only three appearances for Yverdon. At his arrival, he was loaned to The Strongest for a six-month period. For the 2007 season, he rejoined the celestes.

On August 24, 2009, during a league match, Jáuregui was red carded together with Leonardo Medina of Oriente Petrolero after a clash. While leaving the field, he ran towards Medina and performed a side kick him on his face. After the incident Medina was taken to a hospital. Jauregui was banned to play in Bolivia for nine months and charged with assault. On June 10, 2010, Jauregui made his official comeback with the team after his suspension was completed. In January 2011 he transferred to San José.

== International career ==
Between 2004 and 2005, Jáuregui earned 13 caps for the Bolivia national team. He represented his country in nine FIFA World Cup qualification matches.
