= Gustavo Victoria =

Colombian footballer (born 1980)

Personal information
- Full name: Gustavo Andres Victoria Rave
- Date of birth: May 14, 1980 (age 46)
- Place of birth: Armenia, Quindío, Colombia
- Height: 1.70 m (5 ft 7 in)
- Positions: Left back; left winger

Senior career*
Years	Team	Apps	(Gls)
1999–2000	Deportes Quindío	34	(6)
2000	Cortuluá	0	(0)
2001	Deportivo Cali	13	(0)
2001–2002	Galatasaray	22	(1)
2002	Deportivo Cali	10	(0)
2002–2003	Gaziantepspor	9	(1)
2003–2008	Çaykur Rizespor	110	(3)
2005	→ Millonarios (loan)	17	(0)
2009	América de Cali	5	(1)
2009–2012	Deportivo Pereira	46	(2)
2013	Inti Gas	23	(1)

International career
2004	Colombia	7	(0)
- * Club domestic league appearances and goals as of November 13, 2012

Gustavo Andres Victoria Rave (born May 14, 1980) is a Colombian football player. Originally a playmaker, he was deployed at left back and left midfield for several clubs in Colombia and Turkey.

== Club career ==
He transferred first to Galatasaray in Turkey then played for Gaziantepspor for a season and transferred again to Black Sea side Çaykur Rizespor. He played for them until 2008, except for the year 2005 in which he was loaned to Millonarios. In 2004, he played for Colombia in the 2004 Copa América. His contract with Çaykur Rizespor ended in 2008, and he returned to play in Colombia.

He played for América de Cali in 2009 and for Deportivo Pereira between 2009 and 2012.

== Personal life ==
He and his wife, Paola, both converted to Islam.
