= Jonay Hernández =

Venezuelan footballer (born 1979)

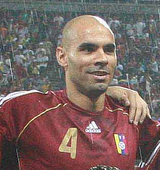
- Hernández lining up for Venezuela in 2008

Personal information
- Full name: Jonay Miguel Santos Hernández
- Date of birth: 15 February 1979 (age 47)
- Place of birth: Maracay, Venezuela
- Height: 1.85 m (6 ft 1 in)
- Position: Left-back

Youth career
- Tenerife

Senior career*
Years	Team	Apps	(Gls)
1997–1998	Tenerife B		
1998–1999	Universidad LP	22	(0)
1999–2000	Real Madrid B	22	(0)
2000–2001	Ourense	38	(1)
2001–2002	Real Madrid B	6	(0)
2002–2005	Dundee	74	(2)
2005	Córdoba	12	(0)
2005	Ciudad Murcia	3	(0)
2006	Zamora	3	(0)
2006–2007	Racing Ferrol	12	(0)
2007–2009	Pontevedra	48	(4)
2009–2010	Melilla	23	(3)
2010–2011	Leganés	30	(0)
2011–2012	Tenerife	18	(0)
Total		311	(10)

International career
2003–2008	Venezuela	29	(0)
- * Club domestic league appearances and goals

Jonay Miguel Hernández Santos (born 15 February 1979) is a Venezuelan former professional footballer who played as a left-back.

He held a Spanish passport due to having spent almost his entire career in that nation, mainly in the Segunda División B where he appeared in 212 matches over one decade.

Hernández represented Venezuela at the 2004 Copa América.

== Club career ==
Born in Maracay, Hernández began his football career in Spain with Universidad de Las Palmas CF. In the following seasons, also in the country, he played mainly in the Segunda División B, successively representing Real Madrid Castilla, CD Tenerife B (Tercera División) and CD Ourense.

Hernández had his first – and only – taste of top-flight football in summer 2002, signing with Scottish Premier League side Dundee. On 28 August 2004 he closed the 4–4 away draw against Hibernian, as the campaign eventually ended in relegation.

In January 2005, after 89 competitive matches, Hernández went back to Spain and joined Córdoba CF. With this club and Ciudad de Murcia he would total 15 Segunda División appearances in two season halves, subsequently returning to the lower leagues.

== International career ==
Hernández made 29 appearances for the Venezuela national team. He made his debut on 26 July 2003 in a friendly against Nigeria, a 1–0 loss at Watford's Vicarage Road, and was selected for the following year's Copa América held in Peru.

== Personal life ==
Hernández's younger brother, Daniel, was also a footballer. A goalkeeper, he too spent most of his professional career in Spain, also being a Venezuelan international.
