= Richard Rojas =

Bolivian footballer (born 1975)

Personal information
- Full name: Richard José Rojas Guzmán
- Date of birth: 27 February 1975 (age 51)
- Place of birth: Cochabamba, Bolivia
- Height: 1.75 m (5 ft 9 in)
- Position: Midfielder

Team information
- Current team: Universitario Tarija (manager)

Senior career*
Years	Team	Apps	(Gls)
1997	Chaco Petrolero		
1998–2002	The Strongest	159	(12)
2003	→ San José (loan)	29	(4)
2004–2005	The Strongest	67	(8)
2006–2007	Aurora	47	(0)
2008–2010	San José	55	(4)
2011–2012	La Paz FC	33	(3)
2012–2013	Jorge Wilstermann	16	(0)
2013–2015	Municipal Tiquipaya		

International career
1999–2004	Bolivia	21	(0)

Managerial career
- 2016–2017: Municipal Tiquipaya
- 2021: Real Tomayapo (assistant)
- 2022: Real Tomayapo (reserves)
- 2022–2023: Real Tomayapo
- 2024: GV San José (interim)
- 2024–: Universitario Tarija
- * Club domestic league appearances and goals

Richard José Rojas Guzmán (born 27 February 1975 in Cochabamba) is a Bolivian football manager and former player who played as a midfielder. He is the current manager of Universitario Tarija.

Rojas' former clubs are Chaco Petrolero, The Strongest, Club Aurora, including a second stint with The Strongest. He played 21 games for the Bolivia national team between 1999 and 2004.
