= Arley Dinas =

Colombian footballer (born 1974)

Personal information
- Full name: José Arley Dinas Rodríguez
- Date of birth: May 16, 1974 (age 52)
- Place of birth: Caloto, Colombia
- Height: 1.77 m (5 ft 10 in)
- Position: Defender

Senior career*
Years	Team	Apps	(Gls)
1991–1997	América de Cali		
1998–2000	Deportes Tolima		
2001	Deportivo Cali	13	(0)
2001	Shonan Bellmare	18	(1)
2002	Millonarios		
2002–2003	Boca Juniors	0	(0)
2003–2005	Deportes Tolima		

International career
1995–2004	Colombia	29	(0)
- * Club domestic league appearances and goals

José Arley Dinas Rodríguez, or simply known as Arley Dinas (born May 16, 1974) is a former Colombian football player.

== Career statistics ==
Appearances and goals by club, season and competition
Club	Season	League			Emperor's Cup		J.League Cup		Total	
Club	Season	Division	Apps	Goals	Apps	Goals	Apps	Goals	Apps	Goals
Shonan Bellmare	2001	J2 League	18	1	2	0	0	0	20	1
Career total			18	1	2	0	0	0	20	1

== National team statistics ==
Colombia national team
Year	Apps	Goals
1995	2	0
1996	0	0
1997	0	0
1998	0	0
1999	1	0
2000	13	0
2001	5	0
2002	0	0
2003	3	0
2004	5	0
Total	29	0
