= Aldo Olcese =

Peruvian footballer (born 1974)

Personal information
- Full name: Aldo Italo Olcese Vassallo
- Date of birth: 23 October 1974 (age 52)
- Place of birth: Lima, Peru
- Height: 1.68 m (5 ft 6 in)
- Position: Attacking midfielder

Youth career
- 1980–1981: Alianza Lima
- 1982–1985: Country Club El Bosque
- 1986–1992: Sporting Cristal

Senior career*
Years	Team	Apps	(Gls)
1993–1994	Sporting Cristal	12	(1)
1995	Aurich–Cañaña	25	(2)
1996	Alianza Atlético	11	(0)
1997–2000	Sporting Cristal	79	(21)
2000–2001	Gent	24	(4)
2002–2005	Alianza Lima	112	(20)
2005	Shenyang Ginde	12	(3)
2006–2007	Alianza Lima	55	(5)
2008	Cienciano	26	(2)
2009	Total Chalaco	29	(7)
2010	Inti Gas	42	(6)
2011–2012	Unión Comercio	57	(8)
2013	Pacífico	24	(1)
2014–2015	Deportivo Municipal	39	(7)
Total		553	(88)

International career
2003–2006	Peru	14	(0)
- * Club domestic league appearances and goals

Aldo Italo Olcese Vassallo (born 23 October 1974) is a Peruvian former professional footballer who played as an attacking midfielder.

== Club career ==
Olcese was born in Lima. He made his debut in the Torneo Descentralizado with America de Cochahuayco in the 1993 season.

== International career ==
Olcese was called up by manager Paulo Autuori for his debut with the senior Peru national team on 23 February 2003. With the score already 3–1, Aldo entered the game in the 59th minute for Fernando del Solar to help his team win the friendly match 5–1 over Haiti. In one of his next games he played the whole second half in Peru's 3-0 win over Chile on 2 April 2003.
