= Guillermo Salas =

Peruvian footballer (born 1974)

Personal information
- Full name: Guillermo Sandro Salas Suárez
- Date of birth: 21 October 1974 (age 52)
- Place of birth: Lima, Peru
- Height: 1.69 m (5 ft 6 1/2 in)
- Position: Right back

Team information
- Current team: Universidad San Martín (manager)

Youth career
- Sporting Cristal

Senior career*
Years	Team	Apps	(Gls)
1994–1996	San Agustín	55	(3)
1997	Alcides Vigo	26	(0)
1998	Deportivo Pesquero	41	(0)
1999–2001	Sport Boys	82	(1)
2001–2007	Alianza Lima	289	(3)
2008–2009	USMP	55	(0)
2010	CNI	9	(0)
2010–2012	León de Huánuco	50	(0)
Total		607	(7)

International career
2003–2008	Peru	26	(0)

Managerial career
- 2016–2017: Alianza Lima (youth)
- 2018–2020: Alianza Lima (reserves)
- 2020: Alianza Lima (interim)
- 2020: Alianza Lima (interim)
- 2020–2022: Alianza Lima (assistant)
- 2022: Alianza Lima (interim)
- 2023: Alianza Lima
- 2024: Universidad César Vallejo
- 2026: Santos de Nasca
- 2026–: Universidad San Martín
- * Club domestic league appearances and goals

Guillermo Sandro Salas Suárez (born 21 October 1974) is a Peruvian football manager and former player who played as a right back. He is the current manager of Universidad San Martín.

== Club career ==
Born in Lima, Salas played seven years for Peruvian giants Alianza Lima as well as for several other clubs.

== International career ==
Salas has made 26 appearances for the senior Peru national football team.

== Personal life ==
Married to Irina Vera in 2002. They have a daughter, Brisa Salas Vera.

== Honours ==
=== Manager ===
Alianza Lima

- Peruvian Primera División: 2022
