= Andreé González =

Venezuelan footballer (born 1975)

Personal information
- Full name: Andreé Aníbal González Frustacci
- Date of birth: 30 June 1975 (age 51)
- Place of birth: San Cristóbal, Venezuela
- Height: 1.89 m (6 ft 2 in)
- Position: Defender

Senior career*
Years	Team	Apps	(Gls)
1993–1996	Peñarol		
1997	Liverpool de Montevideo	23	(7)
1998	Peñarol	12	(2)
1999	Caracas FC		
1999	Liverpool de Montevideo	11	(2)
2000	Recreativo	10	(0)
2000	Peñarol	11	(0)
2001–2003	Fénix	90	(8)
2004	Defensor Sporting	11	(1)
2005–2007	Unión Atlético Maracaibo	6	(0)
2007	Fénix	4	(0)
2008	River Plate (Uruguay)	4	(1)
2008	Monagas SC	14	(0)
2009	Durazno		(1)
2009–2010	Cerrito	14	(0)
2010–2011	Zulia	5	(0)

International career^{‡}
1999–present	Venezuela	17	(0)
- * Club domestic league appearances and goals ‡ National team caps and goals as of 6 February 2008

Andreé González, full name Andreé Aníbal González Frustacci (nicknamed Varilla) (born June 30, 1975), is a Venezuelan footballer who is currently free agent.

== International career ==
González has won 17 caps for the Venezuela national football team.

In 2004, he played the Copa América.
