= Leonardo Fernández (Bolivian footballer) =

Argentine-born Bolivian footballer (born 1974)

Personal information
- Full name: Leonardo Alberto Fernandez Napollitano
- Date of birth: January 13, 1974 (age 52)
- Place of birth: Avellaneda, Argentina
- Height: 1.90 m (6 ft 3 in)
- Position: Goalkeeper

Youth career
- Argentinos Juniors

Senior career*
| Years | Team | Apps | (Gls) |
| 1994–1995 | Argentinos Juniors | 2 | (0) |
| 1996 | Defensores | 9 | (0) |
| 1997–2000 | Oriente Petrolero | 201 total | (0) |
| 2000–2001 | Independiente | 0 | (0) |
| 2001 | Extremadura | 1 | (0) |
| 2001 | Unión Santa Fe | 10 | (0) |
| 2002–2003 | Oriente Petrolero | (see above) | |
| 2004 | Chacarita Juniors | 16 | (0) |
| 2004 | Oriente Petrolero | (see above) | |
| 2005 | Atlético Nacional | 8 | (0) |
| 2005 | Tiro Federal | 2 | (0) |
| 2006 | Palestino | 10 | (0) |
| 2006 | Aucas | 9 | (0) |
| 2007 | Oriente Petrolero | (see above) | |
| 2009 | Real Mamoré | 11 | (0) |
| 2009 | La Paz | 8 | (0) |

International career
| 2003–2005 | Bolivia | 17 | (0) |
- * Club domestic league appearances and goals as of September 28, 2009

Leonardo Alberto Fernandez Napollitano (born January 13, 1974) is a retired Argentine-born Bolivian football goalkeeper. He played for 13 professional clubs in six countries.

== Club career ==
Fernández has an extensive career in football. He started out at Argentinos Juniors, where he was promoted to the first team in 1994. He then transferred to Defensores de Belgrano. After a short spell, he moved to Bolivia in 1997 to join Oriente Petrolero, a club which acquired his playing rights shortly thereafter. Fernández spent a good portion of his career at Oriente, playing there on four occasions. During his first period with Oriente he had a series of impressive displays, a situation that encouraged him to apply for Bolivian citizenship in hopes of getting a call from the Bolivia national team. Fernández also played professionally for Independiente, Unión de Santa Fe, Chacarita Juniors and Tiro Federal in the Argentine Primera, CF Extremadura of the Spanish second division, Atlético Nacional in the Copa Mustang and Sociedad Deportiva Aucas of the Serie A de Ecuador.

In April 2007, while playing for Oriente, Fernández tested positive for marijuana consumption after a league game's doping control test. He appealed for a second test, and after the results came positive again the league decided to suspend him for a two-year period.

In 2009, Fernández returned to professional football with Bolivian first division club Real Mamoré. Later in the year, he joined La Paz F.C., club where he finished his career.

== Bolivia national team ==
After his naturalization, Fernández was called up to represent the Bolivia national team. Between 2003 and 2005, he earned 17 caps, including 3 appearances in Copa América 2004. He represented his newly adopted country in 13 FIFA World Cup qualification matches.

== Club titles ==
| Season | Club | Title |
|---|---|---|
| 2005-I | Atlético Nacional | Fútbol Profesional Colombiano |
