= Andrés Orozco =

Colombian footballer (born 1979)

Personal information
- Full name: Andrés Felipe Orozco Vásquez
- Date of birth: 18 March 1979 (age 47)
- Place of birth: Medellín, Colombia
- Height: 1.85 m (6 ft 1 in)
- Position: Centre back

Youth career
- 1997: Santa Fe

Senior career*
| Years | Team | Apps | (Gls) |
| 1998 | Santa Fe | 40 | (2) |
| 1999 | Deportes Quindío | 17 | (1) |
| 1999–2002 | Independiente Medellín | 70 | (2) |
| 2003–2004 | Racing Club | 45 | (5) |
| 2004–2006 | Dorados | 61 | (6) |
| 2006–2007 | Morelia | 32 | (3) |
| 2007–2008 | Internacional | 14 | (1) |
| 2009–2010 | Atlético Nacional | 40 | (0) |
| 2010–2017 | Envigado | 197 | (6) |

International career
| 1999–2000 | Colombia U20 | | |
| 2001–2006 | Colombia | 20 | (0) |

Managerial career
- 2017–2021: Envigado (assistant)
- 2021: Envigado (interim)
- 2021–: Envigado (youth)
- 2023: Envigado (interim)
- 2024: Envigado (interim)
- 2025–2026: Envigado
- * Club domestic league appearances and goals

Andrés Felipe Orozco Vásquez (born 18 March 1979) is a Colombian football manager and former player who played as a central defender.

== Career ==
Orozco began his professional career with Deportes Quindío in 1999, later that year he moved to Deportivo Independiente Medellín.

In 2001, he was part of the Colombia squad that won the Copa América.

Between 2003 and 2004 Orozco played for Racing Club in the Primera Division Argentina.

Orozco joined Dorados from Racing Club mid-2004, and made his debut for the club in the 2004 Apertura. He immediately made an impact, starting 14 of 17 possible games for the club.

== Honours ==
=== Club ===
Independiente Medellín

- Categoría Primera A: 2002 Finalización

Internacional

- Copa Sudamericana: 2008

=== International ===
Colombia U20

- Toulon Tournament: 1999, 2000

Colombia

- Copa América: 2001
