= Marko Ciurlizza =

Peruvian footballer (born 1978)

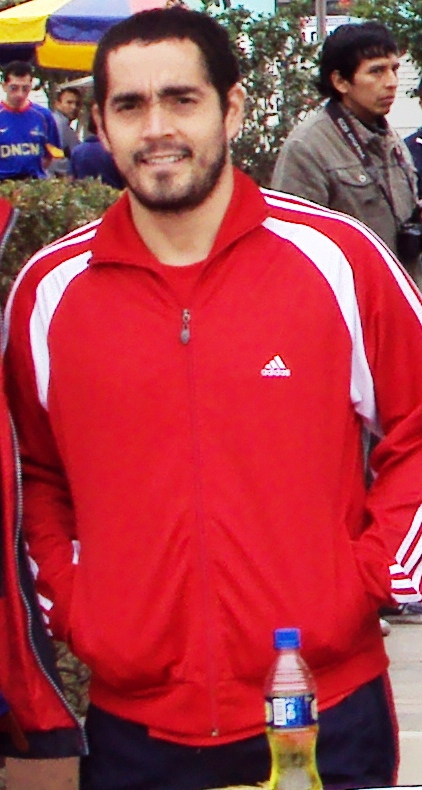

Personal information
- Full name: Marko Gustavo Ciurlizza Rodríguez
- Date of birth: February 22, 1978 (age 48)
- Place of birth: Lima, Peru
- Height: 1.70 m (5 ft 7 in)
- Position: Defensive midfielder

Youth career
- 1991-1995: Universitario de Deportes

Senior career*
Years	Team	Apps	(Gls)
1996–2000	Universitario	141	(3)
2001	Alianza Lima	21	(0)
2001	Botafogo	10	(2)
2002–2010	Alianza Lima	253	(3)
2011	Sport Boys	13	(0)
2012	Cobresol	15	(0)
2013	Pacífico	19	(1)
Total		272	(9)

International career^{‡}
1999–2009	Peru	34	(0)
- * Club domestic league appearances and goals ‡ National team caps and goals as of 15:54, April 9, 2009 (UTC)

Marko Gustavo Ciurlizza Rodríguez (born February 22, 1978, in Lima) is a Peruvian retired footballer who played as a defensive midfielder.

== Club career ==
Marko Ciurlizza started his career playing in soccer at the club Universitario de Deportes. Later he left Universitario and in 2002 joined Alianza Lima. He also had spells with Sport Boys and Cobresol.

== International career ==
Ciurlizza has made 34 appearances for the Peru national football team. He also went to Copa America 2004 part of the squad of Peru. Selected for the 1997 Copa América, he did not play and debuted in the national team on June 29, 1999, at the 1999 Copa América match against Japan.
