= Luis Vallenilla =

Venezuelan footballer (born 1974)

Luis José Vallenilla
Personal information
- Full name: Luis José Vallenilla Pacheco
- Date of birth: 13 March 1974 (age 52)
- Place of birth: Caracas, Venezuela
- Height: 1.86 m (6 ft 1 in)
- Position: Right back

Senior career*
Years	Team	Apps	(Gls)
1992–1998	Trujillanos	94	(2)
1998–2004	Caracas	107	(1)
2001–2002	→ Deportivo Táchira (loan)	22	(0)
2004	Olimpo	11	(1)
2005	Deportivo Cuenca	1	(0)
2005–2006	Mineros de Guayana	32	(0)
2006–2007	UA Maracaibo	38	(2)
2007–2008	Nea Salamina	24	(3)
2008–2016	Mineros de Guayana	212	(15)

International career
1996–2007	Venezuela	76	(1)
- * Club domestic league appearances and goals

Luis José Vallenilla Pacheco (Spanish pronunciation: [ˈlujs βaʎeˈniʎa], born 13 March 1974) is a Venezuelan former professional footballer that played as a right back for the Venezuela national team from 1996 until 2007, earning 76 appearances and scoring 1 goal.

== Club career ==
He began his career with Trujillanos F.C. in his native Venezuela in 1994 and stayed there four years until moving to Caracas F.C., gaining more than 100 appearances over 6 years. He moved to Argentina to play for Club Olimpo for a short time in 2004. In 2006, he moved back to Venezuela to play for Mineros de Guayana for a season, then played for UA Maracaibo, then moved to Cyprus in Europe to play for Nea Salamis FC for a year, and finally went back to Mineros de Guayana for 8 years until his retirement in 2016.

== International career ==
Vallenilla made 77 caps for the Venezuela national football team, scoring a goal. Vallenilla left the national team when manager César Farías arrived, who didn't select the player for the qualifiers of the 2010 FIFA World Cup.

=== International goals ===
#	Date	Venue	Opponent	Score	Result	Competition
1.	13 January 2002	Pueblo Nuevo, San Cristóbal, Venezuela	Cameroon	1–0	1–1	Friendly
Correct as of 7 October 2015
