= Leopoldo Jiménez =

Venezuelan footballer (born 1978)

Personal information
- Full name: Leopoldo Rafael Jiménez
- Date of birth: May 22, 1978 (age 48)
- Place of birth: Caracas, Venezuela
- Height: 1.76 m (5 ft 9 in)
- Position: Midfielder

Senior career*
| Years | Team | Apps | (Gls) |
| 1997–2003 | Italchacao | | |
| 2003–2004 | UA Maracaibo | | |
| 2004 | Once Caldas | 15 | (0) |
| 2005 | Córdoba | 18 | (0) |
| 2005–2006 | Alania Vladikavkaz | 9 | (0) |
| 2006–2007 | Deportivo Táchira | | |
| 2007 | Aris Limassol | 1 | (0) |
| 2008 | Estudiantes de Mérida | 4 | (0) |
| 2009–2010 | Deportivo Italia | 15 | (1) |
| 2010–2014 | Carabobo | 69 | (1) |
| 2014 | Deportivo Anzoátegui | 7 | (0) |

International career
| 1999–2005 | Venezuela | 64 | (0) |
- * Club domestic league appearances and goals

Leopoldo Rafael Jiménez (born May 22, 1978) is a Venezuelan former football midfielder.

== Career ==
Jiménez played club football for a number of professional clubs in both Venezuela and abroad, including Once Caldas in Colombia, Córdoba CF in Spain, FC Alania Vladikavkaz in Russia, Aris Limassol in Cyprus, for Deportivo Chacao in Venezuela where he spent his best years and made honors to be chosen to the Venezuela National Team, and lately in Carabobo FC from Valencia, Venezuela.

== International career ==
He also played 64 times for the Venezuela national team.
