= Roger Suárez =

Bolivian footballer (born 1977)

Personal information
- Full name: Roger Suárez Sandoval
- Date of birth: April 2, 1977 (age 49)
- Place of birth: Santa Cruz de la Sierra, Bolivia
- Height: 1.78 m (5 ft 10 in)
- Position: Striker

Youth career
- 1993–1996: Tahuichi Academy

Senior career*
Years	Team	Apps	(Gls)
1996–2003	Oriente Petrolero	210	(75)
2004	→ Bolívar (loan)	31	(11)
2005	Oriente Petrolero	19	(4)
2006	→ The Strongest (loan)	2	(1)
2006	→ Deportivo Cuenca (loan)	7	(1)
2006	→ Universitario de Sucre (loan)	2	(0)
2006–2007	→ Aldosivi (loan)	9	(0)
2007–2008	Oriente Petrolero	13	(2)
2008	Nacional Potosí	0	(0)
2009–2010	Blooming	30	(3)
2011	San José	11	(1)

International career
1996–2004	Bolivia	29	(7)
- * Club domestic league appearances and goals

Roger Suárez Sandoval (born April 2, 1977) is a Bolivian former professional footballer who played as a striker.

His former clubs include Oriente Petrolero, Bolívar, The Strongest, Universitario de Sucre, Nacional Potosí, Blooming and San José in Bolivia, Club Atlético Aldosivi in Argentina, and Ecuadorian side Deportivo Cuenca.

Nicknamed "Sucha", Suárez has played for the Bolivia national team between 1996 and 2004, scoring 7 goals in 29 games.

== Car accident ==
On March 20, 2010, after practice, Suárez left with teammate Wilber Zabala in his vehicle. Just a couple of miles from Blooming's training ground, they were hit by a mid-size truck on the passenger side where Suárez was sitting. An ambulance was immediately called by witnesses at the scene, and he was rushed to a nearby hospital where they discovered he had fractured twelve ribs as a result of the collision. He spent five days in the intensive care unit before he regained his consciousness and was able to speak again. He spent 10 months away from the field. Finally, in January 2011 he returned to professional football when he signed for San José. That same year he retired from the sport.

== Honours ==
Oriente Petrolero

- Liga de Fútbol Profesional Boliviano: 2001

Bolívar

- Liga de Fútbol Profesional Boliviano: 2004 (A)

Blooming

- Liga de Fútbol Profesional Boliviano: 2009 (C)
