= Gonzalo Galindo =

Bolivian footballer (born 1974)

Personal information
- Full name: Gonzalo Germán Galindo Sánchez
- Date of birth: October 20, 1974 (age 52)
- Place of birth: Cochabamba, Bolivia
- Height: 1.72 m (5 ft 8 in)
- Position: Midfielder

Senior career*
Years	Team	Apps	(Gls)
1996–2001	Wilstermann	196	(55)
2001–2005	Bolívar	108	(19)
2005	Emelec	12	(2)
2006	Alianza Lima	8	(1)
2006	Wilstermann	0	(0)
2007	The Strongest	38	(2)
2008–2010	Real Potosí	83	(2)
2011–2012	Aurora		
2012	Petrolero		

International career
1998–2007	Bolivia	43	(3)
- * Club domestic league appearances and goals as of September 25, 2009

Gonzalo Germán Galindo Sánchez (born October 20, 1974) is a Bolivian retired football midfielder.

== Club career ==
At the club level, he has played for Jorge Wilstermann (twice), Bolivar, the Ecuatorian club Emelec, Alianza Lima of Peru, and The Strongest.

== International career ==
Galindo made his debut for the Bolivia national team in 1999, and has been capped 43 times and scored 3 goals. He represented his country in 20 FIFA World Cup qualification matches and at the 1999 Confederations Cup.
