= 2018 FBF División Profesional =

División Profesional
- Season: 2018
- Dates: 27 January – 19 December 2018
- Champions: Apertura: Jorge Wilstermann (14th title); Clausura: San José (4th title)
- Relegated: Universitario
- Copa Libertadores: Jorge Wilstermann; San José; The Strongest; Bolívar
- Copa Sudamericana: Royal Pari; Oriente Petrolero; Nacional Potosí; Guabirá
- Matches: 308
- Goals: 980 (3.18 per match)
- Top goalscorer: Apertura: Carlos Saucedo (18 goals); Clausura: 3 players (20 goals each)
- Biggest home win: San José 8–0 Destroyers (12 May); Bolívar 8–0 Real Potosí (16 December); The Strongest 8–0 Blooming (19 December)
- Biggest away win: Real Potosí 0–6 Wilstermann (29 April)
- Highest scoring: Bolívar 7–5 Royal Pari (7 October)

The 2018 FBF División Profesional was the 41st season of Bolivia's top-flight football league and the first season under División de Fútbol Profesional management. Bolívar were the defending champions, having won the 2017 Clausura tournament.

In the Torneo Apertura, Jorge Wilstermann won their fourteenth league title, and seventh in the professional era, after beating The Strongest on penalties in the third and last match of the finals on 6 June, and San José won their fourth league title in the Torneo Clausura on 19 December after tying with Royal Pari by a 1–1 score.

== Format ==
Given that the league was expanded from 12 to 14 teams, the league format had a slight variation for this season. The Torneo Apertura was played in the first half of the year, with the 14 teams being split into two groups of seven teams each for the first stage, in which teams in each group played each other as well as a team from the other group (their derby rival) twice, for a total of 14 matches. The top four teams from each group qualified for the knockout stage, where they were sorted in four ties played on a home-and-away basis, with the four winners advancing to the semifinals and the winners of each semifinal advancing to the final of the tournament. The six teams that failed to qualify for the knockout stage played another separate knockout tournament for a berth to the Copa Sudamericana. On the other hand, the Torneo Clausura was played in the second half of the year under a double round-robin system, with all teams playing each other twice for a total of 26 matches.

International qualification was as follows: the champions and runners-up of each tournament qualified for the 2019 Copa Libertadores, while the third-placed team in each tournament, as well as the fourth-placed in the Clausura and the winners of the Apertura's secondary knockout tournament would qualify for the 2019 Copa Sudamericana.

== Teams ==
The number of teams for the 2018 season was increased by two, from twelve to fourteen. Aurora and Royal Pari were promoted to the top flight after winning the 2016–17 Copa Simón Bolívar and 2017 Copa Simón Bolívar, respectively. Petrolero was relegated to the ATF Championship after losing the relegation playoff to Destroyers, the 2016–17 Copa Simón Bolívar runner-up.

Locations of the 2018 Primera División teams.

Team	Manager	Home city	Home stadium	Capacity
Aurora	(Bolivia) Marcos Ferrufino	Cochabamba	Félix Capriles^{a}	32,000
Blooming	(Bolivia) Erwin Sánchez	Santa Cruz	Ramón Tahuichi Aguilera	38,000
Bolívar	(Uruguay) Alfredo Arias	La Paz	Hernando Siles	42,000
Destroyers	(Bolivia) Óscar Ramírez	Santa Cruz	Ramón Tahuichi Aguilera	38,000
Guabirá	(Bolivia) Víctor Hugo Antelo	Montero	Gilberto Parada^{b}	13,000
Jorge Wilstermann	(Bolivia) Álvaro Peña	Cochabamba	Félix Capriles^{a}	32,000
Nacional Potosí	(Bolivia) Alberto Illanes	Potosí	Víctor Agustín Ugarte	32,105
Oriente Petrolero	(Bolivia) Ronald Arana	Santa Cruz	Ramón Tahuichi Aguilera	38,000
Real Potosí	(Bolivia) Darwin Peña (caretaker)	Potosí	Víctor Agustín Ugarte	32,105
Royal Pari	(Peru) Roberto Mosquera	Santa Cruz	Ramón Tahuichi Aguilera	38,000
San José	(Bolivia) Eduardo Villegas	Oruro	Jesús Bermúdez	33,795
Sport Boys	(Argentina) César Vigevani	Warnes	Samuel Vaca	9,000
The Strongest	(Venezuela) César Farías	La Paz	Hernando Siles	42,000
Universitario de Sucre	(Argentina) Adrián Romero	Sucre	Olímpico Patria	30,700

a: Aurora and Jorge Wilstermann played their Torneo Apertura home games at Estadio Capitán José Angulo in Sacaba due to the closure of Estadio Félix Capriles in preparation of the 2018 South American Games. Aurora played its Torneo Apertura home match against Jorge Wilstermann at Estadio Evo Morales in Ivirgarzama.
b: Guabirá played six of their seven home games in the Torneo Apertura first stage at Estadio Ramón Tahuichi Aguilera in Santa Cruz de la Sierra and Estadio Samuel Vaca in Warnes while their regular stadium Estadio Gilberto Parada underwent remodeling works.

=== Managerial changes ===
Team	Outgoing manager	Manner of departure	Date of vacancy	Position in table	Incoming manager	Date of appointment
Torneo Apertura
Nacional Potosí	(Spain) Ángel Pérez García	Sacked	8 February 2018	6th (Serie B)	(Argentina) Edgardo Malvestiti	10 February 2018
Sport Boys	(Bolivia) Marcos Ferrufino	Sacked	25 February 2018	7th (Serie B)	(Argentina) César Vigevani	25 February 2018
Blooming	(Costa Rica) Jeaustin Campos	Mutual consent	6 March 2018	5th (Serie B)	(Bolivia) Roly Paniagua (caretaker)	7 March 2018
Blooming	(Bolivia) Roly Paniagua	End of caretaker spell	25 March 2018	4th (Serie B)	(Bolivia) Erwin Sánchez	26 March 2018
The Strongest	(Argentina) Carlos Ischia	Mutual consent	26 March 2018	2nd (Serie B)	(Venezuela) César Farías	29 March 2018
Royal Pari	(Mexico) David de la Torre	Mutual consent	4 April 2018	7th (Serie B)	(Argentina) Miguel Abrigo (caretaker)	4 April 2018
Aurora	(Argentina) Miguel Ángel Zahzú	Resigned	16 April 2018	5th (Serie B)	(Bolivia) Román Arriarán (caretaker)	16 April 2018
Royal Pari	(Argentina) Miguel Abrigo	End of caretaker spell	17 April 2018	7th (Serie B)	(Peru) Roberto Mosquera	17 April 2018
Oriente Petrolero	(Argentina) Néstor Clausen	Mutual consent	14 May 2018	3rd (Serie A), QFs	(Argentina) Juan Manuel Llop	9 June 2018
Real Potosí	(Bolivia) Milton Maygua	Mutual consent	14 May 2018	5th (Serie A), SFs	(Bolivia) Néstor Cari (caretaker)	16 May 2018
Universitario de Sucre	(Argentina) Óscar Sanz	End of contract	15 May 2018	7th (Serie A), QFs	(Argentina) Carlos Leeb	4 June 2018
Torneo Clausura
Bolívar	(Brazil) Vinícius Eutrópio	Sacked	9 June 2018	Pre-tournament	(Uruguay) Alfredo Arias	16 June 2018
Real Potosí	(Bolivia) Néstor Cari	End of caretaker spell	13 June 2018	Pre-tournament	(Argentina) Wálter Botto	13 June 2018
Aurora	(Bolivia) Román Arriarán	End of caretaker spell	18 June 2018	Pre-tournament	(Paraguay) Roberto Pérez	18 June 2018
Real Potosí	(Argentina) Wálter Botto	Sacked	4 August 2018	13th	(Bolivia) Sergio Apaza	4 August 2018
Aurora	(Paraguay) Roberto Pérez	Resigned	7 August 2018	13th	(Bolivia) Marcos Ferrufino	8 August 2018
Destroyers	(Bolivia) José Peña	Resigned	13 August 2018	11th	(Brazil) Cleibson Ferreira	14 August 2018
Nacional Potosí	(Argentina) Edgardo Malvestiti	Sacked	21 August 2018	10th	(Bolivia) Alberto Illanes	22 August 2018
Universitario de Sucre	(Argentina) Carlos Leeb	Sacked	21 August 2018	14th	(Argentina) Adrián Romero	22 August 2018
Oriente Petrolero	(Argentina) Juan Manuel Llop	Resigned	20 September 2018	6th	(Bolivia) Luis Marín Camacho (caretaker)	21 September 2018
Oriente Petrolero	(Bolivia) Luis Marín Camacho	End of caretaker spell	30 September 2018	6th	(Bolivia) Ronald Arana	1 October 2018
Destroyers	(Brazil) Cleibson Ferreira	Resigned	26 October 2018	11th	(Bolivia) Óscar Ramírez	26 October 2018
Real Potosí	(Bolivia) Sergio Apaza	Sacked	19 December 2018	13th	(Bolivia) Darwin Peña (caretaker)	19 December 2018

== Torneo Apertura ==
The Torneo Apertura began on 27 January and ended on 6 June.

=== Standings ===
==== Serie A ====
Pos	Team	Pld	W	D	L	GF	GA	GD	Pts	Qualification
1	Jorge Wilstermann	14	10	2	2	42	13	+29	32	Qualification to Championship playoff
2	Bolívar	14	7	4	3	30	16	+14	25	Qualification to Championship playoff
3	Oriente Petrolero	14	5	5	4	26	21	+5	20	Qualification to Championship playoff
4	Destroyers	14	3	7	4	22	28	−6	16	Qualification to Championship playoff
5	Real Potosí (Note: Real Potosí were deducted three points as punishment for failing to pay debts with former players and managers.)	14	5	1	8	23	47	−24	13	Qualification to Copa Sudamericana playoff
6	Guabirá	14	2	5	7	23	28	−5	11	Qualification to Copa Sudamericana playoff
7	Universitario de Sucre	14	2	5	7	18	29	−11	11	Qualification to Copa Sudamericana playoff

Source: LFPB, Soccerway
Rules for classification: 1) Points, 2) Goal difference, 3) Goals for, 4) Away goals for, 5) Drawing of lots.

==== Serie B ====
Pos	Team	Pld	W	D	L	GF	GA	GD	Pts	Qualification
1	San José	14	9	4	1	29	11	+18	31	Qualification to Championship playoff
2	The Strongest	14	7	1	6	22	16	+6	22	Qualification to Championship playoff
3	Nacional Potosí	14	5	3	6	21	24	−3	18	Qualification to Championship playoff
4	Blooming (Note: Blooming were deducted six points as punishment for outstanding debts with former players Ignacio Ithurralde and Marcos Acosta.)	14	7	2	5	18	20	−2	17	Qualification to Championship playoff
5	Royal Pari	14	3	5	6	13	19	−6	14	Qualification to Copa Sudamericana playoff
6	Aurora	14	3	5	6	14	21	−7	14	Qualification to Copa Sudamericana playoff
7	Sport Boys	14	3	5	6	14	22	−8	14	Qualification to Copa Sudamericana playoff

Source: LFPB, Soccerway
Rules for classification: 1) Points, 2) Goal difference, 3) Goals for, 4) Away goals for, 5) Drawing of lots.

=== Results ===
Home \ Away	AUR	BLO	BOL	DES	GUA	WIL	NAC	OPE	RPO	RPA	SJO	SBO	STR	UNI
Aurora	—	0–2	—	—	—	0–0	2–0	—	—	0–0	1–1	2–2	2–0	—
Blooming	1–0	—	—	—	—	—	1–2	1–1	—	2–2	0–1	1–0	2–1	—
Bolívar	—	—	—	1–1	2–0	5–1	—	0–0	5–1	—	—	—	3–0	2–0
Destroyers	—	—	2–2	—	4–4	0–2	—	3–1	2–0	0–2	—	—	—	1–0
Guabirá	—	—	4–1	0–0	—	1–3	—	1–2	6–0	—	—	1–1	—	2–2
Jorge Wilstermann	5–1	—	4–2	4–0	3–0	—	—	1–0	4–0	—	—	—	—	7–0
Nacional Potosí	1–1	4–3	—	—	—	—	—	—	2–3	2–2	2–2	3–0	0–1	—
Oriente Petrolero	—	1–2	0–0	4–4	5–2	3–1	—	—	3–1	—	—	—	—	4–2
Real Potosí	—	—	1–6	5–2	2–1	0–6	3–2	2–1	—	—	—	—	—	4–4
Royal Pari	3–0	0–1	—	2–2	—	—	1–0	—	—	—	0–2	1–2	0–2	—
San José	3–2	4–0	—	—	—	—	1–2	—	—	3–0	—	4–0	3–1	2–1
Sport Boys	1–2	0–2	—	—	1–1	—	4–0	—	—	0–0	0–0	—	3–2	—
The Strongest	2–1	4–0	2–0	—	—	—	0–1	—	—	3–0	1–1	3–0	—	—
Universitario de Sucre	—	—	0–1	1–1	2–0	1–1	—	1–1	3–1	—	1–2	—	—	—

Source: LFPB, Soccerway
Legend: Blue = home team win; Yellow = draw; Red = away team win.

=== Championship playoff ===
==== Quarterfinals ====
Teams			Scores		
Team 1	Points	Team 2	1st leg	2nd leg	Penalty shootout (if needed)
Jorge Wilstermann	6:0	Blooming	3–0	3–1	—
Nacional Potosí	0:6	Bolívar	1–2	0–1	—
Oriente Petrolero	0:6	The Strongest	0–1	1–5	—
Destroyers	3:3	San José	1–0	0–8	2–4

==== Semifinals ====
Teams			Scores		
Team 1	Points	Team 2	1st leg	2nd leg	Penalty shootout (if needed)
San José	0:6	Jorge Wilstermann	2–4	0–1	—
Bolívar	1:4	The Strongest	0–1	1–1	—

==== Third place play-off ====
Teams			Scores		
Team 1	Points	Team 2	1st leg	2nd leg	Tiebreaker match (if needed)
San José	6:0	Bolívar	4–0	2–0	—

==== Finals ====
30 May 2018
20:00 UTC−4

The Strongest	2–1	Jorge Wilstermann
Ballivián 42'; Martelli 78'	Report	Alex Silva 62'

Estadio Hernando Siles, La Paz
Referee: Juan Nelio García

3 June 2018
15:00 UTC−4

Jorge Wilstermann	2–1	The Strongest
Serginho 3', 31'	Report	Martelli 45'

Estadio Capitán José Angulo, Sacaba
Referee: Ivo Méndez

6 June 2018
20:00 UTC−4

Jorge Wilstermann	2–2	The Strongest
Álvarez 9'; Serginho 49'	Report	Martelli 40'; Ortiz 78'
Penalties
Saucedo (penalty missed); Chávez (penalty scored); Ortiz (penalty missed); Lucas Gaúcho (penalty scored); Giménez (penalty missed); Álvarez (penalty missed); Vaca (penalty scored)	3–2	(penalty scored) Martelli; (penalty missed) Ortiz; (penalty missed) Escobar; (penalty scored) Valverde; (penalty missed) Ibargüen; (penalty missed) Vaca; (penalty missed) Cardozo

Estadio Olímpico Patria, Sucre
Referee: Ivo Méndez

División de Fútbol Profesional
2018 Torneo Apertura champions

=== Copa Sudamericana playoff ===
==== Quarterfinals ====
Teams			Scores		
Team 1	Points	Team 2	1st leg	2nd leg	Penalty shootout (if needed)
Sport Boys	4:1	Real Potosí	0–0	2–1	—
Guabirá	4:1	Aurora	1–0	0–0	—
Royal Pari	6:0	Universitario de Sucre	1–0	2–0	—

==== Semifinals ====
Teams			Scores		
Team 1	Points	Team 2	1st leg	2nd leg	Penalty shootout (if needed)
Royal Pari	3:3	Real Potosí	2–1	0–3	3–4
Guabirá	2:2	Sport Boys	2–2	0–0	5–4

==== Finals ====
Teams			Scores		
Team 1	Points	Team 2	1st leg	2nd leg	Tiebreaker match (if needed)
Guabirá	6:0	Real Potosí	4–1	2–0	—

=== Top goalscorers ===
Rank	Name	Club	Goals
1	(Bolivia) Carlos Saucedo	San José	18
2	(Bolivia) Gilbert Álvarez	Jorge Wilstermann	16
3	(Bolivia) José Alfredo Castillo	Guabirá	12
4	(Brazil) Jefferson Tavares	Destroyers	9
5	(Venezuela) José Alí Meza	Oriente Petrolero	8
6	(Spain) Juanmi Callejón	Bolívar	7
6	(Bolivia) Ricardo Pedriel	Jorge Wilstermann	7
6	(Bolivia) Rodrigo Ramallo	San José	7
6	(Colombia) Harold Reina	Nacional Potosí	7
6	(Argentina) Marcos Riquelme	Bolívar	7

Source: LFPB

== Torneo Clausura ==
=== Standings ===
Pos	Team	Pld	W	D	L	GF	GA	GD	Pts	Qualification
1	San José (C)	26	17	2	7	71	38	+33	53	Qualification to Copa Libertadores group stage
2	The Strongest	26	16	2	8	65	29	+36	50	Qualification to Copa Libertadores second stage
3	Royal Pari	26	15	5	6	51	35	+16	50	
4	Bolívar	26	15	2	9	72	45	+27	47	
5	Jorge Wilstermann	26	13	5	8	42	30	+12	44	
6	Sport Boys	26	12	5	9	44	47	−3	41	
7	Nacional Potosí	26	11	5	10	43	40	+3	38	
8	Oriente Petrolero	26	11	5	10	27	32	−5	38	
9	Blooming	26	10	6	10	41	43	−2	36	
10	Guabirá	26	9	3	14	37	48	−11	30	
11	Aurora	26	8	3	15	25	40	−15	27	
12	Real Potosí	26	6	4	16	30	68	−38	22	
13	Universitario de Sucre (Note: Universitario de Sucre were deducted three points as punishment for failing to pay an outstanding debt with former manager Óscar Sanz.)	26	6	5	15	18	50	−32	20	
14	Destroyers	26	4	6	16	22	45	−23	18	

Source: FBF, Soccerway
Rules for classification: 1) Points, 2) Playoff game (only if needed to decide championship between two teams), 3) Goal difference, 4) Goals for, 5) Away goals for, 6) Drawing of lots.
(C) Champions

=== Results ===
Home \ Away	AUR	BLO	BOL	DES	GUA	WIL	NAC	OPE	RPO	RPA	SJO	SBO	STR	UNI
Aurora	—	0–0	0–4	5–0	1–0	2–0	1–0	0–0	3–2	0–2	1–2	4–2	1–2	0–0
Blooming	2–1	—	3–2	1–0	2–3	0–3	3–1	2–0	5–0	1–1	1–3	2–1	2–1	7–1
Bolívar	3–0	3–0	—	5–1	3–0	2–1	2–0	3–0	8–0	7–5	4–2	3–3	1–1	6–0
Destroyers	1–0	1–1	0–2	—	1–2	0–0	0–2	0–0	2–1	2–0	3–0	2–3	0–1	1–1
Guabirá	3–0	3–1	2–0	3–2	—	4–0	2–2	0–1	2–2	1–2	2–0	2–3	0–2	2–0
Jorge Wilstermann	3–0	0–0	3–1	2–1	3–2	—	2–2	1–2	4–0	1–0	3–1	1–0	3–1	2–0
Nacional Potosí	2–1	0–0	6–1	0–0	3–2	1–0	—	3–0	2–0	3–1	2–5	1–1	2–3	2–0
Oriente Petrolero	2–0	0–3	2–1	1–0	0–0	1–1	1–0	—	7–2	1–0	1–3	1–1	2–1	2–0
Real Potosí	1–0	1–1	4–2	3–2	2–0	0–2	2–3	1–0	—	1–2	0–5	3–1	0–3	1–1
Royal Pari	4–1	3–2	4–2	1–1	2–1	2–2	5–1	1–0	2–1	—	1–1	4–1	1–0	3–0
San José	3–2	4–1	3–2	3–1	6–0	2–1	2–3	5–0	2–1	1–1	—	6–0	3–1	3–0
Sport Boys	2–0	1–0	4–1	3–0	2–0	2–1	2–1	0–1	4–1	0–3	3–0	—	2–2	2–1
The Strongest	0–1	8–0	0–1	4–1	6–0	4–1	2–0	2–1	5–1	3–1	4–2	6–0	—	2–1
Universitario de Sucre	0–1	2–1	1–3	1–0	2–1	0–2	2–1	2–1	0–0	0–1	0–4	1–1	2–1	—

Source: Soccerway
Legend: Blue = home team win; Yellow = draw; Red = away team win.

División de Fútbol Profesional
2018 Torneo Clausura champions

=== Top goalscorers ===
Rank	Name	Club	Goals
1	(Panama) Rolando Blackburn	The Strongest	20
1	(Colombia) Jair Reinoso	San José	20
1	(Argentina) Marcos Riquelme	Bolívar	20
4	(Bolivia) Pablo Escobar	The Strongest	16
5	(Spain) Juanmi Callejón	Bolívar	15
5	(Colombia) John Jairo Mosquera	Royal Pari	15
7	(Uruguay) William Ferreira	Bolívar	14
7	(Argentina) Martín Prost	Sport Boys	14
9	(Bolivia) José Alfredo Castillo	Guabirá	13
10	(Colombia) Harold Reina	Nacional Potosí	12
10	(Argentina) Javier Sanguinetti	San José	12

Source: Soccerway

== Aggregate table ==
The aggregate table was elaborated considering the results in the Torneo Apertura (only the first stage) and the Torneo Clausura. The bottom-placed team in this table at the end of the season was relegated, while the next lowest placed team played the relegation playoff. In addition to this, all international qualification berths left vacant at the end of the season were allocated through this table.

Pos	Team	Pld	W	D	L	GF	GA	GD	Pts	Qualification
1	San José (C)	40	26	6	8	99	49	+50	84	Qualification to Copa Libertadores group stage
2	Jorge Wilstermann (C)	40	23	7	10	85	42	+43	76	Qualification to Copa Libertadores group stage
3	The Strongest	40	23	3	14	87	45	+42	72	Qualification to Copa Libertadores second stage
4	Bolívar	40	22	6	12	102	61	+41	72	Qualification to Copa Libertadores first stage
5	Royal Pari	40	18	10	12	65	53	+12	64	Qualification to Copa Sudamericana first stage
6	Oriente Petrolero	40	16	10	14	53	53	0	58	Qualification to Copa Sudamericana first stage
7	Nacional Potosí	40	16	8	16	64	64	0	56	Qualification to Copa Sudamericana first stage
8	Sport Boys	40	15	10	15	58	69	−11	55	
9	Blooming (Note: Blooming were deducted six points as punishment for outstanding debts with former players Ignacio Ithurralde and Marcos Acosta.)	40	17	8	15	59	62	−3	53	
10	Guabirá	40	11	8	21	60	76	−16	41	Qualification to Copa Sudamericana first stage
11	Aurora	40	11	8	21	39	61	−22	41	
12	Real Potosí (Note: Real Potosí were deducted three points as punishment for failing to pay debts with former players and managers.)	40	11	5	24	53	115	−62	35	
13	Destroyers (O)	40	7	13	20	44	73	−29	34	Qualification to Relegation playoff
14	Universitario de Sucre (Note: Universitario were deducted three points as punishment for failing to pay an outstanding debt with former manager Óscar Sanz.) (R)	40	8	10	22	36	79	−43	31	Relegation to Copa Simón Bolívar

Source: Boliviagol
Rules for classification: 1) Points, 2) Playoff game (only if needed to decide teams for relegation), 3) Goal difference, 4) Goals for, 5) Away goals for, 6) Drawing of lots.
(C) Champions; (O) Play-off winners; (R) Relegated

== Relegation/promotion playoff ==
The relegation playoff was played between:

- Destroyers (2018 División Profesional aggregate table 13th place)
- Avilés Industrial (2018 Copa Simón Bolívar runners-up)

The winners will play in the top flight for the 2019 season.

23 December 2018
15:30

Avilés Industrial	1–2	Destroyers
Costa 12'	Report	Álvarez 35'; Tavares 45'

Estadio IV Centenario, Tarija
Referee: Luis Yrusta

26 December 2018
20:30

Destroyers	2–0	Avilés Industrial
Saravia 65' (pen.); Tavares 90+2'	Report

Estadio Ramón Tahuichi Aguilera, Santa Cruz de la Sierra
Referee: Raúl Orosco

Destroyers won 6–0 on points.
