= 2019 FBF División Profesional =

División Profesional
- Season: 2019
- Dates: 19 January – 28 December 2019
- Champions: Apertura: Bolívar (29th title); Clausura: Jorge Wilstermann (15th title)
- Relegated: Sport Boys (disaffiliated); Destroyers
- Copa Libertadores: Bolívar; Jorge Wilstermann; The Strongest; San José
- Copa Sudamericana: Nacional Potosí; Blooming; Always Ready; Oriente Petrolero
- Matches: 363
- Goals: 1,205 (3.32 per match)
- Top goalscorer: Apertura: Carlos Saucedo (23 goals); Clausura: Juan Miguel Callejón and Jair Reinoso (19 goals each)
- Biggest home win: San José 7–0 Destroyers (15 September); The Strongest 7–0 Sport Boys (4 December)
- Biggest away win: Guabirá 0–5 Bolívar (14 August); Aurora 1–6 San José (29 September)
- Highest scoring: Nacional Potosí 7–2 Destroyers (15 March); Destroyers 3–6 Bolívar (3 April); Bolívar 6–3 Aurora (1 May); Bolívar 7–2 Guabirá (18 October)

The 2019 FBF División Profesional, known as the 2019 Copa Tigo for sponsorship reasons, was the 42nd season of Bolivia's top-flight football league and the second season under División de Fútbol Profesional management. San José were the defending champions, having won the 2018 Clausura tournament.

In the Torneo Apertura, Bolívar won their twenty-ninth league title and twenty-third in the professional era, with two matches to spare following a 2–1 victory over Oriente Petrolero on 16 May, while in the Torneo Clausura, Jorge Wilstermann won their fifteenth league title and eighth in the professional era following a 3–1 win against Oriente Petrolero on the last matchday of the tournament on 28 December.

== Format ==
The season was split into a Torneo Apertura and a Torneo Clausura, played in the first and second half of the year, respectively. Both were played under a double round-robin system, with all teams playing each other twice for a total of 26 matches. The teams placed first at the end of each tournament were the champions and earned qualification for the Copa Libertadores group stage. The remaining two Copa Libertadores berths as well as the four Copa Sudamericana ones were awarded through the aggregate table.

== Teams ==
The number of teams for the 2019 season remained the same as the 2018 season. Universitario were relegated to the Copa Simón Bolívar after finishing in last place of the aggregate table in the previous season, and were replaced by Always Ready, the 2018 Copa Simón Bolívar champions, who made their return to the top tier after 28 years.

Locations of the 2019 División Profesional teams.

Team	Manager	Home city	Home stadium	Capacity
Always Ready	(Paraguay) Pablo Godoy (caretaker)	La Paz	Municipal de Villa Ingenio	25,000
Aurora	(Paraguay) Francisco Argüello	Cochabamba	Félix Capriles	32,000
Blooming	(Bolivia) Erwin Sánchez	Santa Cruz	Ramón Tahuichi Aguilera	38,000
Bolívar	(Argentina) César Vigevani	La Paz	Hernando Siles	42,000
Destroyers	(Bolivia) Víctor Hugo Antelo	Santa Cruz	Ramón Tahuichi Aguilera	38,000
Guabirá	(Argentina) Víctor Hugo Andrada	Montero	Gilberto Parada	13,000
Jorge Wilstermann	(Argentina) Christian Díaz	Cochabamba	Félix Capriles	32,000
Nacional Potosí	(Bolivia) Alberto Illanes	Potosí	Víctor Agustín Ugarte	32,105
Oriente Petrolero	(Argentina) Pablo Sánchez	Santa Cruz	Ramón Tahuichi Aguilera	38,000
Real Potosí	(Bolivia) Marcos Ferrufino	Potosí	Víctor Agustín Ugarte	32,105
Royal Pari	(Argentina) Miguel Ángel Abrigo (caretaker)	Santa Cruz	Ramón Tahuichi Aguilera	38,000
San José	(Chile) Miguel Ponce	Oruro	Jesús Bermúdez	33,795
Sport Boys	(Bolivia) Mauro Blanco	Warnes	Samuel Vaca Jiménez	9,000
The Strongest	(Bolivia) Mauricio Soria	La Paz	Hernando Siles	42,000

=== Managerial changes ===
Team	Outgoing manager	Manner of departure	Date of vacancy	Position in table	Incoming manager	Date of appointment
Torneo Apertura
Bolívar	(Uruguay) Alfredo Arias	End of contract	19 December 2018	Pre-season	(Argentina) César Vigevani	20 December 2018
Jorge Wilstermann	(Bolivia) Álvaro Peña	Resigned	19 December 2018	Pre-season	(Spain) Miguel Ángel Portugal	20 December 2018
Oriente Petrolero	(Bolivia) Ronald Arana	End of contract	19 December 2018	Pre-season	(Bolivia) Mauricio Soria	21 December 2018
Real Potosí	(Bolivia) Darwin Peña	End of caretaker spell	19 December 2018	Pre-season	(Bolivia) Fernando Ochoaizpur	28 December 2018
Sport Boys	(Argentina) César Vigevani	Signed by Bolívar	19 December 2018	Pre-season	(Argentina) Carlos Leeb	28 December 2018
The Strongest	(Venezuela) César Farías	End of contract	19 December 2018	Pre-season	(Bolivia) Pablo Escobar	24 December 2018
Guabirá	(Bolivia) Víctor Hugo Antelo	Resigned	20 December 2018	Pre-season	(Bolivia) Ronald Arana	27 December 2018
Destroyers	(Bolivia) Óscar Ramírez	Replaced	7 January 2019	Pre-season	(Brazil) Evandro Guimarães	7 January 2019
San José	(Bolivia) Eduardo Villegas	Signed by Bolivia	14 January 2019	Pre-season	(Bolivia) Jaime Jemio (caretaker)	18 January 2019
San José	(Bolivia) Jaime Jemio	End of caretaker spell	20 January 2019	6th	(Argentina) Néstor Clausen	21 January 2019
Always Ready	(Mexico) David de la Torre	Sacked	30 January 2019	10th	(Bolivia) Julio César Baldivieso	31 January 2019
Guabirá	(Bolivia) Ronald Arana	Mutual consent	1 March 2019	12th	(Uruguay) Eduardo Espinel	9 March 2019
Sport Boys	(Argentina) Carlos Leeb	Sacked	6 March 2019	11th	(Argentina) Christian Lovrincevich	6 March 2019
San José	(Argentina) Néstor Clausen	Sacked	6 March 2019	6th	(Bolivia) William Ramallo (caretaker)	7 March 2019
Real Potosí	(Bolivia) Fernando Ochoaizpur	Sacked	16 March 2019	10th	(Bolivia) Julio Fernández (caretaker)	16 March 2019
San José	(Bolivia) William Ramallo	End of caretaker spell	17 March 2019	6th	(Chile) Miguel Ponce	18 March 2019
Real Potosí	(Bolivia) Julio Fernández	End of caretaker spell	20 March 2019	11th	(Argentina) Leandro Cabrera	20 March 2019
Aurora	(Bolivia) Marcos Ferrufino	Mutual consent	7 April 2019	14th	(Brazil) Thiago Leitão	8 April 2019
Real Potosí	(Argentina) Leandro Cabrera	Sacked	18 April 2019	13th	(Argentina) Fabio Espada	18 April 2019
Jorge Wilstermann	(Spain) Miguel Ángel Portugal	Mutual consent	21 April 2019	6th	(Argentina) Norberto Kekez (caretaker)	22 April 2019
Torneo Clausura
Aurora	(Brazil) Thiago Leitão	End of contract	22 May 2019	Pre-tournament	(Uruguay) Julio César Fuentes	7 June 2019
Jorge Wilstermann	(Argentina) Norberto Kekez	End of caretaker spell	22 May 2019	Pre-tournament	(Argentina) Christian Díaz	2 June 2019
Sport Boys	(Argentina) Christian Lovrincevich	Replaced	21 June 2019	Pre-tournament	(Bolivia) Víctor Hugo Antelo	21 June 2019
Oriente Petrolero	(Bolivia) Mauricio Soria	Mutual consent	11 July 2019	Pre-tournament	(Bolivia) Luis Marín Camacho (caretaker)	11 July 2019
The Strongest	(Bolivia) Pablo Escobar	Sacked	5 August 2019	5th	(Bolivia) Mauricio Soria	5 August 2019
Guabirá	(Uruguay) Eduardo Espinel	Sacked	5 August 2019	14th	(Argentina) Víctor Hugo Andrada	5 August 2019
Real Potosí	(Argentina) Fabio Espada	Sacked	7 August 2019	11th	(Bolivia) Nicolás Suárez	7 August 2019
Royal Pari	(Peru) Roberto Mosquera	Resigned	19 August 2019	9th	(Argentina) Miguel Ángel Abrigo (caretaker)	19 August 2019
Destroyers	(Brazil) Evandro Guimarães	Sacked	1 September 2019	13th	(Argentina) Carlos Leeb	4 September 2019
Royal Pari	(Argentina) Miguel Ángel Abrigo	End of caretaker spell	2 September 2019	8th	(Colombia) Francisco Maturana	2 September 2019
Aurora	(Uruguay) Julio César Fuentes	Sacked	10 September 2019	12th	(Bolivia) Mauricio Adorno (caretaker)	10 September 2019
Always Ready	(Bolivia) Julio César Baldivieso	Sacked	16 September 2019	6th	(Chile) Sebastián Núñez	17 September 2019
Oriente Petrolero	(Bolivia) Luis Marín Camacho	End of caretaker spell	29 September 2019	9th	(Argentina) Pablo Sánchez	27 September 2019
Real Potosí	(Bolivia) Nicolás Suárez	Sacked	7 October 2019	13th	(Bolivia) Marcos Ferrufino	11 October 2019
Sport Boys	(Bolivia) Víctor Hugo Antelo	Resigned	13 November 2019	12th	(Bolivia) Mauro Blanco	25 November 2019
Destroyers	(Argentina) Carlos Leeb	Sacked	9 December 2019	13th	(Bolivia) Víctor Hugo Antelo	9 December 2019
Aurora	(Bolivia) Mauricio Adorno	End of caretaker spell	17 December 2019	13th	(Paraguay) Francisco Argüello	17 December 2019
Royal Pari	(Colombia) Francisco Maturana	Mutual consent	20 December 2019	9th	(Argentina) Miguel Ángel Abrigo (caretaker)	20 December 2019
Always Ready	(Chile) Sebastián Núñez	End of contract	21 December 2019	4th	(Paraguay) Pablo Godoy (caretaker)	23 December 2019

== Torneo Apertura ==
=== Standings ===
Pos	Team	Pld	W	D	L	GF	GA	GD	Pts	Qualification
1	Bolívar (C)	26	17	6	3	66	35	+31	57	Qualification for Copa Libertadores group stage
2	The Strongest	26	16	4	6	55	30	+25	52	
3	Nacional Potosí	26	15	5	6	44	22	+22	50	
4	Blooming	26	15	2	9	55	45	+10	47	
5	San José (Note: San José were deducted three points as punishment for failing to pay a debt with former player Boris Alfaro on time.)	26	12	7	7	55	44	+11	40	
6	Jorge Wilstermann	26	12	4	10	44	37	+7	40	
7	Oriente Petrolero	26	11	4	11	41	43	−2	37	
8	Guabirá	26	8	7	11	31	49	−18	31	
9	Always Ready	26	8	6	12	50	43	+7	30	
10	Real Potosí	26	7	6	13	41	59	−18	27	
11	Royal Pari	26	6	7	13	39	55	−16	25	
12	Sport Boys	26	5	8	13	32	51	−19	23	
13	Aurora	26	6	5	15	32	52	−20	23	
14	Destroyers	26	5	7	14	23	43	−20	22	

Source: FBF, Soccerway
Rules for classification: 1) Points, 2) Playoff game (only if needed to decide championship between two teams), 3) Goal difference, 4) Goals for, 5) Away goals for, 6) Drawing of lots.
(C) Champions

=== Results ===
Home \ Away	CAR	AUR	BLO	BOL	DES	GUA	WIL	NAC	OPE	RPO	RPA	SJO	SBO	STR
Always Ready	—	2–0	3–0	1–1	2–0	6–0	2–2	1–2	5–0	3–1	6–0	3–3	3–1	1–2
Aurora	3–1	—	3–4	3–3	2–0	1–1	1–2	0–0	3–2	3–2	2–3	0–2	0–2	2–1
Blooming	1–0	1–0	—	2–1	2–1	4–2	2–0	0–1	3–2	5–3	2–3	5–1	1–2	2–0
Bolívar	2–1	6–3	4–1	—	2–0	3–0	3–0	1–1	3–0	4–3	3–0	2–3	4–1	1–3
Destroyers	2–0	0–0	1–0	3–6	—	2–3	0–3	1–0	0–0	3–0	0–0	2–1	0–0	0–1
Guabirá	1–1	1–0	2–2	0–1	1–0	—	1–1	0–0	2–3	2–1	3–1	2–1	1–0	1–2
Jorge Wilstermann	2–0	2–1	2–5	0–2	3–3	0–2	—	2–0	0–1	5–0	2–1	0–0	5–2	0–1
Nacional Potosí	3–1	0–1	2–0	0–1	7–2	4–0	2–1	—	2–1	0–1	4–1	1–0	3–0	1–0
Oriente Petrolero	4–1	5–0	0–1	1–2	1–0	1–1	2–0	0–2	—	2–1	1–1	4–3	2–1	2–1
Real Potosí	2–1	2–2	2–2	2–2	3–2	3–1	1–2	1–3	1–1	—	3–1	2–1	2–1	0–2
Royal Pari	1–1	2–1	1–3	1–2	0–0	2–1	2–3	1–1	1–3	4–1	—	0–1	3–3	5–0
San José	6–2	3–0	5–1	4–4	2–0	3–1	0–3	2–2	3–2	2–2	2–1	—	2–1	1–1
Sport Boys	1–1	3–0	1–5	1–2	1–1	2–2	1–3	2–0	2–1	1–1	2–2	1–2	—	0–0
The Strongest	3–2	2–1	3–1	1–1	3–0	5–0	2–1	2–3	4–0	4–1	5–2	2–2	5–0	—

Source: Soccerway
Legend: Blue = home team win; Yellow = draw; Red = away team win.

División de Fútbol Profesional
2019 Torneo Apertura champions

=== Top goalscorers ===
Rank	Name	Club	Goals
1	(Bolivia) Carlos Saucedo	San José	23
2	(Panama) Rolando Blackburn	The Strongest	21
3	(Spain) Juan Miguel Callejón	Bolívar	17
4	(Uruguay) William Ferreira	Always Ready	13
4	(Argentina) Marcos Riquelme	Bolívar	13
6	(Bolivia) Vladimir Castellón	Nacional Potosí	12
6	(Argentina) Marcos Ovejero	Always Ready	12
8	(Bolivia) José Alfredo Castillo	Oriente Petrolero	11
8	(Brazil) Rafinha	Blooming	11
8	(Colombia) Jair Reinoso	The Strongest	11

Source: Soccerway

== Torneo Clausura ==
=== Standings ===
Pos	Team	Pld	W	D	L	GF	GA	GD	Pts	Qualification
1	Jorge Wilstermann (C)	26	18	6	2	57	21	+36	60	Qualification for Copa Libertadores group stage
2	The Strongest	26	17	6	3	72	27	+45	57	
3	Bolívar	26	17	5	4	74	34	+40	56	
4	San José (Note: San José were deducted three points as punishment for failing to pay a debt with former player Jair Reinoso, and an additional three points for outstanding debts with former players.)	26	15	5	6	62	30	+32	44	
5	Always Ready	26	13	5	8	54	39	+15	44	
6	Oriente Petrolero	26	11	4	11	39	43	−4	37	
7	Nacional Potosí	26	9	7	10	47	45	+2	34	
8	Blooming	26	10	3	13	34	55	−21	33	
9	Royal Pari	26	7	7	12	28	40	−12	28	
10	Aurora	26	5	9	12	24	47	−23	24	
11	Real Potosí	25	6	3	16	35	57	−22	21	
12	Guabirá	26	4	8	14	22	53	−31	20	
13	Destroyers	26	4	5	17	22	66	−44	17	
14	Sport Boys (Note: Sport Boys were deducted six points for outstanding debts with former players.) (D)	25	5	7	13	30	42	−12	16	Excluded from the tournament (Note: Sport Boys were excluded from the Torneo Clausura and disaffiliated from the league per ruling from the FBF's Tribunal de Disciplina Deportiva (TDD) after they failed to show up for their last Torneo Clausura match against Real Potosí.)

Source: FBF, Soccerway
Rules for classification: 1) Points, 2) Playoff game (only if needed to decide championship between two teams), 3) Goal difference, 4) Goals for, 5) Away goals for, 6) Drawing of lots.
(C) Champions; (D) Disqualified

=== Results ===
Home \ Away	CAR	AUR	BLO	BOL	DES	GUA	WIL	NAC	OPE	RPO	RPA	SJO	SBO	STR
Always Ready	—	0–2	3–0	0–1	6–0	4–0	1–1	3–2	3–0	5–1	3–2	2–4	2–1	2–2
Aurora	1–1	—	0–1	0–1	1–0	1–1	0–2	1–1	2–1	0–0	2–0	1–6	0–0	2–2
Blooming	2–3	0–1	—	2–3	1–0	1–1	0–3	4–0	2–1	2–0	1–1	1–0	4–1	1–0
Bolívar	3–0	5–0	6–0	—	3–0	7–2	1–1	2–1	3–2	5–2	2–2	1–4	2–0	1–1
Destroyers	1–3	1–0	2–4	2–3	—	0–0	1–0	0–2	1–2	1–1	0–2	4–2	1–0	2–3
Guabirá	2–0	3–1	1–1	0–5	1–1	—	1–4	1–1	1–3	0–1	1–1	2–1	0–0	1–5
Jorge Wilstermann	3–0	5–1	2–0	3–2	7–1	2–0	—	1–1	3–1	3–1	1–0	1–1	3–2	1–1
Nacional Potosí	3–2	3–2	5–0	0–3	4–1	2–1	1–3	—	2–3	1–2	5–2	1–1	1–1	0–4
Oriente Petrolero	1–1	2–1	2–1	2–2	3–1	1–2	1–1	2–2	—	2–1	1–3	1–0	3–2	1–2
Real Potosí	1–2	1–1	5–1	2–5	5–0	1–0	0–1	1–4	0–1	—	2–0	1–4	— (Note: The Real Potosí vs. Sport Boys match, originally scheduled on 28 December at 16:00, was not played as the away team failed to show up at the stadium. After a 10-minute wait, as indicated by tournament regulations, the referee officially declared the match as suspended.)	1–3
Royal Pari	1–1	2–2	3–1	2–1	1–1	2–0	0–2	0–2	1–0	1–0	—	0–1	0–1	0–2
San José	2–3	3–0	4–0	2–2	7–0	2–1	1–2	2–1	3–1	3–2	3–1	—	2–0	2–0
Sport Boys	1–2	4–0	2–3	1–3	1–1	2–0	1–2	0–0	1–2	6–2	1–1	1–1	—	1–0
The Strongest	3–2	2–2	6–1	3–2	4–0	4–0	2–0	3–2	2–0	6–2	4–0	1–1	7–0	—

Source: Soccerway
Legend: Blue = home team win; Yellow = draw; Red = away team win.

División de Fútbol Profesional
2019 Torneo Clausura champions

=== Top goalscorers ===
Rank	Name	Club	Goals
1	(Spain) Juan Miguel Callejón	Bolívar	19
1	(Colombia) Jair Reinoso	The Strongest	19
3	(Bolivia) Gilbert Álvarez	Jorge Wilstermann	18
3	(Bolivia) Carlos Saucedo	San José	18
5	(Bolivia) Carmelo Algarañaz	Always Ready	13
5	(Argentina) Enzo Maidana	Nacional Potosí	13
5	(Colombia) Harold Reina	The Strongest	13
8	(Bolivia) Juan Carlos Arce	Bolívar	12
9	(Bolivia) Vladimir Castellón	Bolívar	11
9	(Colombia) John Jairo Mosquera	Royal Pari	11

Source: Soccerway

== Aggregate table ==
Pos	Team	Pld	W	D	L	GF	GA	GD	Pts	Qualification
1	Bolívar (C)	52	34	11	7	140	69	+71	113	Qualification for Copa Libertadores group stage
2	The Strongest	52	33	10	9	127	57	+70	109	Qualification for Copa Libertadores second stage
3	Jorge Wilstermann (C)	52	30	10	12	101	58	+43	100	Qualification for Copa Libertadores group stage
4	San José (Note: San José were deducted three points as punishment for failing to pay a debt with former player Boris Alfaro on time, an additional three points as punishment for failing to pay a debt with former player Jair Reinoso, and an additional three points for outstanding debts with former players.)	52	27	12	13	117	74	+43	84	Qualification for Copa Libertadores first stage
5	Nacional Potosí	52	24	12	16	91	67	+24	84	Qualification for Copa Sudamericana first stage
6	Blooming	52	25	5	22	89	100	−11	80	Qualification for Copa Sudamericana first stage
7	Always Ready	52	21	11	20	104	83	+21	74	Qualification for Copa Sudamericana first stage
8	Oriente Petrolero	52	22	8	22	80	86	−6	74	Qualification for Copa Sudamericana first stage
9	Royal Pari	52	13	14	25	67	95	−28	53	
10	Guabirá	52	12	15	25	53	102	−49	51	
11	Real Potosí	51	13	9	29	76	116	−40	48	
12	Aurora	52	11	14	27	56	99	−43	47	
13	Sport Boys (Note: Sport Boys were deducted six points for outstanding debts with former players.) (D, R)	51	10	15	26	62	93	−31	39	Disaffiliated from the league (Note: Sport Boys were excluded from the Torneo Clausura and disaffiliated from the league per ruling from the FBF's Tribunal de Disciplina Deportiva (TDD) after they failed to show up for their last Torneo Clausura match against Real Potosí.)
14	Destroyers (R)	52	9	12	31	45	109	−64	39	Relegation to Copa Simón Bolívar

Source: Boliviagol
Rules for classification: 1) Points, 2) Playoff game (only if needed to decide relegation between two teams), 3) Goal difference, 4) Goals for, 5) Away goals for, 6) Drawing of lots.
(C) Champions; (D) Disqualified; (R) Relegated

== Relegation/promotion playoff ==
The relegation playoff would have been played by Sport Boys, as the team placed 13th in the 2019 División Profesional aggregate table, and Real Santa Cruz, who were the 2019 Copa Simón Bolívar runners-up, with the winners playing in the top flight for the 2020 season. However, considering Sport Boys' disaffiliation from the league as well as Destroyers's relegation as the bottom-placed team in the aggregate table, and with the late conclusion of the 2019 season which made infeasible playing the playoff in early January 2020, the FBF decided on 5 January 2020 that Real Santa Cruz would be promoted for the next season as Copa Simón Bolívar runners-up.
