= 2020 FBF División Profesional =

División Profesional
- Season: 2020
- Dates: 21 January – 31 December 2020
- Champions: Always Ready (3rd title)
- Relegated: None
- Copa Libertadores: Always Ready; The Strongest; Bolívar; Royal Pari
- Copa Sudamericana: Jorge Wilstermann; Guabirá; Nacional Potosí; Atlético Palmaflor
- Matches: 182
- Goals: 564 (3.1 per match)
- Top goalscorer: Marcos Riquelme (20 goals)
- Biggest home win: Always Ready 8–0 Blooming (7 December)
- Biggest away win: Real Santa Cruz 1–5 Oriente Petrolero (16 February)
- Highest scoring: Bolívar 5–4 The Strongest (21 February)

The 2020 FBF División Profesional, known as the 2020 Copa Tigo for sponsorship reasons, was the 43rd season of the División Profesional del Fútbol Boliviano, Bolivia's top-flight football league and the third season under División de Fútbol Profesional management. The season started on 21 January 2020 and ended on 31 December 2020. Jorge Wilstermann were the defending champions, having won the 2019 Clausura tournament.

Always Ready won their first title in the División Profesional and third overall (first since 1957) in the top flight of Bolivian football with a 2–0 victory over Nacional Potosí on the twenty-sixth and final matchday of the Torneo Apertura, played on 31 December.

The tournament was suspended from 16 March to 27 November due to the COVID-19 pandemic. As of 30 October 2020, Bolivia was the only one of CONMEBOL's member associations to have its top-tier football league still suspended due to the pandemic.

== Teams ==
The number of teams for the 2020 season remained the same as the previous season. Destroyers were relegated to the Copa Simón Bolívar after finishing in last place of the aggregate table in the previous season, with Sport Boys being disaffiliated from the league after failing to show up for their last game of the season. Both teams were replaced by Atlético Palmaflor and Real Santa Cruz, the 2019 Copa Simón Bolívar champions and runners-up, respectively.

Locations of the 2020 División Profesional teams.

Team	Manager	City	Stadium	Capacity
Always Ready	(Argentina) Omar Asad	El Alto	Municipal de Villa Ingenio	25,000
Atlético Palmaflor	(Spain) Xabier Azkargorta	Quillacollo	Municipal de Quillacollo	6,000
Atlético Palmaflor	(Spain) Xabier Azkargorta	Cochabamba	Félix Capriles (Note: Used by Atlético Palmaflor for their home matches against Royal Pari, Guabirá, Blooming, Real Santa Cruz, Oriente Petrolero, Aurora, The Strongest, and Real Potosí.)	32,000
Atlético Palmaflor	(Spain) Xabier Azkargorta	Villa Tunari	Bicentenario (Note: To be used by Atlético Palmaflor for their home matches following the COVID-19 pandemic, due to maintenance works at their regular home stadium Estadio Municipal de Quillacollo, Quillacollo.)	25,000
Aurora	(Bolivia) Sergio Zeballos (caretaker)	Cochabamba	Félix Capriles	32,000
Blooming	(Argentina) Gabriel Schürrer	Santa Cruz	Ramón Tahuichi Aguilera	38,000
Blooming	(Argentina) Gabriel Schürrer	Santa Cruz	Real Santa Cruz (Note: Used by Blooming for their home match against The Strongest.)	14,000
Blooming	(Argentina) Gabriel Schürrer	Montero	Gilberto Parada (Note: Used by Blooming for their home match against San José.)	13,000
Bolívar	(Spain) Natxo González	La Paz	Hernando Siles	42,000
Guabirá	(Argentina) Víctor Hugo Andrada	Montero	Gilberto Parada	13,000
Jorge Wilstermann	(Argentina) Christian Díaz	Cochabamba	Félix Capriles	32,000
Jorge Wilstermann	(Argentina) Christian Díaz	Sacaba	Capitán José Angulo (Note: Used by Jorge Wilstermann for their home match against Nacional Potosí.)	6,200
Nacional Potosí	(Chile) Sebastián Núñez	Potosí	Víctor Agustín Ugarte	32,105
Oriente Petrolero	(Bolivia) Erwin Sánchez	Santa Cruz	Ramón Tahuichi Aguilera	38,000
Oriente Petrolero	(Bolivia) Erwin Sánchez	Montero	Gilberto Parada (Note: Used by Oriente Petrolero for their home match against Real Santa Cruz.)	13,000
Real Potosí	(Argentina) Cristian Aldirico	Potosí	Víctor Agustín Ugarte	32,105
Real Santa Cruz	(Bolivia) José Peña	Santa Cruz	Real Santa Cruz	14,000
Real Santa Cruz	(Bolivia) José Peña	Santa Cruz	Ramón Tahuichi Aguilera (Note: Used by Real Santa Cruz for their home matches prior to the COVID-19 pandemic due to remodeling works at Estadio Real Santa Cruz.)	38,000
Real Santa Cruz	(Bolivia) José Peña	Montero	Gilberto Parada (Note: Used by Real Santa Cruz for their home match against San José.)	13,000
Royal Pari	(Argentina) Miguel Ángel Abrigo	Santa Cruz	Ramón Tahuichi Aguilera	38,000
Royal Pari	(Argentina) Miguel Ángel Abrigo	Santa Cruz	Real Santa Cruz (Note: Used by Royal Pari for their home match against Real Potosí.)	14,000
Royal Pari	(Argentina) Miguel Ángel Abrigo	Montero	Gilberto Parada (Note: Used by Royal Pari for their home matches against Nacional Potosí, Aurora and The Strongest.)	13,000
San José	(Argentina) Arnaldo Mancilla	Oruro	Jesús Bermúdez	33,795
The Strongest	(Bolivia) Alberto Illanes	La Paz	Hernando Siles	42,000

=== Managerial changes ===
Team	Outgoing manager	Manner of departure	Date of vacancy	Position in table	Incoming manager	Date of appointment
Torneo Apertura
Always Ready	(Paraguay) Pablo Godoy	End of caretaker spell	28 December 2019	Pre-season	(Bolivia) Eduardo Villegas	23 December 2019
Royal Pari	(Argentina) Miguel Ángel Abrigo	End of caretaker spell	28 December 2019	Pre-season	(Spain) Miguel Ángel Portugal	2 January 2020
Aurora	(Paraguay) Francisco Argüello	End of contract	28 December 2019	Pre-season	(Bolivia) Julio César Baldivieso	29 December 2019
Blooming	(Bolivia) Erwin Sánchez	End of contract	28 December 2019	Pre-season	(Chile) Miguel Ponce	1 January 2020
Bolívar	(Argentina) César Vigevani	End of contract	28 December 2019	Pre-season	(Argentina) Claudio Vivas	28 December 2019
Nacional Potosí	(Bolivia) Alberto Illanes	End of contract	28 December 2019	Pre-season	(Costa Rica) Jeaustin Campos	30 December 2019
Real Potosí	(Bolivia) Marcos Ferrufino	End of contract	28 December 2019	Pre-season	(Argentina) Walter Grazziosi	5 January 2020
San José	(Chile) Miguel Ponce	End of contract	28 December 2019	Pre-season	(Argentina) Omar Asad	5 January 2020
Real Potosí	(Argentina) Walter Grazziosi	Mutual consent	24 January 2020	14th	(Bolivia) Marcos Ferrufino	25 January 2020
The Strongest	(Bolivia) Mauricio Soria	Sacked	2 March 2020	13th	(Bolivia) Luis Orozco (caretaker)	3 March 2020
The Strongest	(Bolivia) Luis Orozco	End of caretaker spell	8 March 2020	7th	(Bolivia) Alberto Illanes	9 March 2020
Nacional Potosí	(Costa Rica) Jeaustin Campos	Sacked	9 March 2020	10th	(Chile) Sebastián Núñez	9 March 2020
Real Potosí	(Bolivia) Marcos Ferrufino	Sacked	20 March 2020	10th	(Argentina) Cristian Aldirico	3 September 2020
Royal Pari	(Spain) Miguel Ángel Portugal	Resigned	21 May 2020	6th	(Argentina) Miguel Ángel Abrigo	25 August 2020
San José	(Argentina) Omar Asad	Resigned	25 May 2020	8th	(Argentina) Arnaldo Mancilla	9 September 2020
Blooming	(Chile) Miguel Ponce	Mutual consent	13 October 2020	4th	(Argentina) Gabriel Schürrer	22 October 2020
Bolívar	(Argentina) Claudio Vivas	Sacked	21 October 2020	3rd	(Bolivia) Wálter Flores (caretaker)	21 October 2020
Oriente Petrolero	(Argentina) Pablo Sánchez	Mutual consent	13 November 2020	12th	(Bolivia) Erwin Sánchez	18 November 2020
Always Ready	(Bolivia) Eduardo Villegas	Mutual consent	5 December 2020	4th	(Argentina) Omar Asad	5 December 2020
Atlético Palmaflor	(Bolivia) Humberto Viviani	Sacked	9 December 2020	7th	(Spain) Xabier Azkargorta	10 December 2020
Bolívar	(Bolivia) Wálter Flores	End of caretaker spell	15 December 2020	2nd	(Spain) Natxo González	12 December 2020
Aurora	(Bolivia) Julio César Baldivieso	Sacked	16 December 2020	14th	(Bolivia) Sergio Zeballos (caretaker)	17 December 2020

== Effects of the COVID-19 pandemic ==
On 16 March, the Bolivian Football Federation (FBF) decided to suspend both the División Profesional and División Aficionados tournaments until 31 March due to the COVID-19 pandemic, with the suspension being extended until the second semester of 2020 due to the extension of the lockdown and the ban on sporting activities until 31 May enacted by the Bolivian interim government.

On 2 June, the FBF presented to the Bolivian interim government a proposal to resume activities for both the national team and the football league, with the national team starting training sessions from 15 June and the 14 División Profesional teams in July, resuming the tournament in August, however, the government only approved the biosecurity protocols submitted by the FBF on 25 July, authorizing Bolívar and Jorge Wilstermann to resume their training sessions on account of their involvement in the 2020 Copa Libertadores which was scheduled to resume in September, while the other 12 División Profesional clubs had to submit their protocols to the Bolivian Society of Sports Medicine for their approval. On 5 June, in a virtual meeting of the Superior Council of the División Profesional, Bolívar's chairman Marcelo Claure proposed to resume and conclude the Torneo Apertura in Cochabamba over three weeks, a proposal backed by Aurora and Jorge Wilstermann. In response to this proposal, FBF's Director of Competitions Adrián Monje stated that they would need seven stadiums for it to be implemented and the lack of places to train was a major limitation.

On 12 August, the FBF presented a new proposal to resume the Torneo Apertura on 21 or 25 October, pending the development of the pandemic in the country, however, on 15 August the Ministry of Health through their General Manager of Hospitals René Sahonero stated that the Bolivian government was aiming at a resumption of the competition in the first week of November. Sahonero also stated that should the rates of COVID-19 infection failed to decrease by then, no tournament could be played for the remainder of the year.

On 8 September, the Bolivian government through its Vice-Minister of Sports Augusto Chávez stated that the Bolivian government would guarantee the return to activity of the División Profesional on the proposed deadlines of 21 or 25 October, as long as the 14 clubs of the league came to an agreement on a date for resumption, met biosecurity protocols, and matches were played behind closed doors. As of that day, six clubs had already resumed their training sessions: Bolívar, Jorge Wilstermann, Oriente Petrolero, Blooming, Royal Pari, and Guabirá. However, on 8 October, FBF's Director of Competitions Adrián Monje stated that they had not yet received an official approval from the Bolivian central government to resume the competition, in spite of the fact that some local authorities were willing to grant their permission for matches to be played within their jurisdictions.

The death of FBF president César Salinas by COVID-19 on 19 July and the subsequent institutional crisis triggered by this event and the inability to come to an agreement on an interim president were also factors contributing to the delay in the resumption of the competition, as the 14 División Profesional clubs split into two groups backing different members of the FBF's Council as interims and failed to agree on a possible date of return to competition as both sides repeatedly boycotted and prevented the Superior Council of the División Profesional from taking place due to lack of quorum. A Superior Council meeting scheduled for 5 November in La Paz, called by both claimants to the FBF's interim presidency Marcos Rodríguez and Roberto Blanco, was cancelled by the former due to a civic strike which was also scheduled on that day in the city.

On 11 November, it was revealed that the FBF was considering two proposals to return to competition: one of them was resuming the tournament on 22 November and ending on 13 January 2021, while the other one was resuming on 29 November and concluding the season on 23 January 2021, with the Torneo Apertura being the only competition to be played for the remainder of the season. That same day, Bolívar chairman Marcelo Claure announced that CONMEBOL would not accept any Bolivian entrants into the 2021 Copa Libertadores or Copa Sudamericana and the FBF would face sanctions in case league competition did not resume.

On 24 November, in a meeting of the Superior Council of the División Profesional held in La Paz, the representatives of the 14 clubs voted to resume the season starting from 28 November with the thirteenth matchday of the Torneo Apertura and ending on 31 December 2020 with the last matchday, meaning that 98 matches were to be played in 32 days. Furthermore, it was decided that no clubs would be relegated at the end of the season.

== Torneo Apertura ==
=== Standings ===
Pos	Team	Pld	W	D	L	GF	GA	GD	Pts	Qualification
1	Always Ready (C)	26	16	3	7	59	29	+30	51	Qualification for Copa Libertadores group stage
2	The Strongest	26	16	2	8	65	35	+30	50	Qualification for Copa Libertadores group stage
3	Bolívar	26	15	4	7	60	29	+31	49	Qualification for Copa Libertadores second stage
4	Royal Pari	26	14	4	8	42	34	+8	46	Qualification for Copa Libertadores first stage
5	Jorge Wilstermann	26	12	6	8	36	28	+8	42	Qualification for Copa Sudamericana first stage
6	Guabirá	26	13	3	10	43	43	0	42	Qualification for Copa Sudamericana first stage
7	Nacional Potosí	26	11	6	9	34	35	−1	39	Qualification for Copa Sudamericana first stage
8	Atlético Palmaflor	26	11	5	10	29	30	−1	38	Qualification for Copa Sudamericana first stage
9	Blooming	26	12	2	12	38	43	−5	38	
10	Oriente Petrolero	26	9	3	14	37	51	−14	30	
11	Aurora	26	6	5	15	26	37	−11	23	
12	Real Potosí	26	6	5	15	35	59	−24	23	
13	Real Santa Cruz	26	6	5	15	36	62	−26	23	
14	San José (Note: San José were deducted three points as punishment for failing to pay outstanding debts with former players.)	26	6	5	15	27	52	−25	20	

Source: FBF, Soccerway
Rules for classification: 1) Points, 2) Playoff game (only if needed to decide championship between two teams), 3) Goal difference, 4) Goals for, 5) Away goals for, 6) Drawing of lots.
(C) Champions

=== Results ===
Home \ Away	CAR	APF	AUR	BLO	BOL	GUA	WIL	NAC	OPE	RPO	RSC	RPA	SJO	STR
Always Ready	—	4–0	1–0	8–0	2–1	2–0	1–0	2–2	4–2	4–1	6–0	2–1	1–2	4–1
Atlético Palmaflor	2–0	—	1–0	2–1	1–0	2–0	1–1	0–0	1–0	0–0	2–1	1–0	5–0	2–1
Aurora	1–1	0–0	—	3–2	0–1	2–0	2–1	1–1	2–1	4–0	1–1	0–1	2–0	1–2
Blooming	0–2	3–1	4–0	—	2–1	1–2	2–1	2–1	3–1	2–1	1–1	1–0	4–0	1–3
Bolívar	0–0	3–1	3–0	3–0	—	5–0	1–1	4–0	4–1	0–0	4–0	4–0	2–0	5–4
Guabirá	2–1	2–0	2–1	1–1	2–1	—	1–3	1–0	1–2	4–0	1–0	4–2	4–0	3–2
Jorge Wilstermann	2–0	2–1	1–1	3–0	2–0	1–0	—	2–1	2–2	3–1	0–0	2–3	1–2	0–0
Nacional Potosí	0–2	4–2	2–1	1–0	1–1	1–0	1–0	—	2–1	4–0	1–0	0–0	3–2	3–1
Oriente Petrolero	2–0	0–1	2–1	1–0	3–4	2–3	0–1	1–0	—	2–0	3–2	2–2	1–0	0–3
Real Potosí	3–5	1–0	2–1	1–3	2–3	0–1	4–1	2–3	2–2	—	2–1	2–2	2–1	3–5
Real Santa Cruz	0–3	2–1	4–2	0–2	2–4	4–4	1–3	2–1	1–5	3–1	—	2–4	1–1	3–2
Royal Pari	4–1	3–1	1–0	2–3	1–0	2–1	3–0	4–1	1–0	1–1	0–2	—	2–0	1–0
San José	1–3	1–1	1–0	1–0	2–5	2–2	0–2	1–1	4–1	1–2	4–1	0–2	—	1–1
The Strongest	2–0	1–0	2–0	3–0	2–1	6–2	0–1	3–0	7–0	3–2	4–2	4–0	3–0	—

Source: FBF, Soccerway
Legend: Blue = home team win; Yellow = draw; Red = away team win.

=== Top goalscorers ===
Rank	Name	Club	Goals
1	(Argentina) Marcos Riquelme	Bolívar	20
2	(Colombia) Jair Reinoso	The Strongest	17
3	(Brazil) Jefferson Tavares	Atlético Palmaflor	14
4	(Argentina) Javier Sanguinetti	Always Ready	13
4	(Brazil) Willie	The Strongest	13
6	(Bolivia) Bruno Miranda	Royal Pari	12
7	(Panama) Rolando Blackburn	The Strongest	11
8	(Venezuela) José Caraballo	Real Santa Cruz	10
8	(Bolivia) José Alfredo Castillo	Oriente Petrolero	10
8	(Spain) Fran Pastor	Real Potosí	10
8	(Argentina) Alejandro Quintana	Guabirá	10

Source: Soccerway

== Torneo Clausura ==
Due to the COVID-19 pandemic and the suspension of the Torneo Apertura which was extended for 8 months, as well as the need to end the season in the calendar year, the Torneo Clausura which is usually scheduled for the second half of the year was cancelled.
