= 2022 FBF División Profesional =

División Profesional
- Season: 2022
- Dates: 4 February – 10 November 2022
- Champions: Apertura: Bolívar (30th title); Clausura: None, abandoned
- Relegated: Universitario de Sucre
- Copa Libertadores: Bolívar; The Strongest; Always Ready; Nacional Potosí
- Copa Sudamericana: Oriente Petrolero; Guabirá; Atlético Palmaflor; Blooming
- Matches: 333
- Goals: 935 (2.81 per match)
- Top goalscorer: Apertura: Chico (10 goals); Clausura: Marcos Riquelme (19 goals)
- Biggest home win: Bolívar 6–0 Royal Pari (3 April); Bolívar 6–0 Blooming (16 April)
- Biggest away win: Blooming 0–7 Bolívar (6 February)
- Highest scoring: Always Ready 6–2 Universitario (V) (8 April); The Strongest 4–4 Bolívar (12 October)

The 2022 FBF División Profesional, known as the 2022 Copa Tigo for sponsorship reasons, was the 45th season of the División Profesional del Fútbol Boliviano, Bolivia's top-flight football league and the fifth season under División de Fútbol Profesional management. The season began on 4 February and was scheduled to end on 13 November 2022.

In the Torneo Apertura, Bolívar won their thirtieth league title and twenty-fourth in the professional era, by defeating crosstown rivals The Strongest in the final match played on 12 June by a 3–0 score. On the other hand, the Torneo Clausura was abandoned on 10 November 2022 with 24 out of 30 rounds played and no champion was declared due to civil unrest in the Santa Cruz Department. Independiente Petrolero were the defending champions, having won the 2021 tournament.

== Format ==
The format for the 2022 season was approved by the 16 División Profesional clubs on 21 December 2021. The league returned to the Apertura and Clausura format after the year-long tournament held in 2021 due to the COVID-19 pandemic. The Torneo Apertura, which was played from 6 February to 12 June, had a first stage with the 16 participating clubs divided into two groups of eight, from which the top four clubs of each group advanced to a knockout stage in which the champions were decided. Meanwhile, the Torneo Clausura, played from 1 July to 10 November, was played under a double round-robin format.

The distribution of international berths was confirmed on 11 January 2022. The champions of both tournaments, as well as the Torneo Clausura runners-up and the best placed team in the aggregate table would qualify for the 2023 Copa Libertadores, while the Torneo Apertura runners-up, the Copa Bolivia champions, and the next two best placed teams in the aggregate table would qualify for the 2023 Copa Sudamericana.

== Teams ==
16 teams competed in the league for the 2022 season, 14 of which took part in 2021. The 2021 Copa Simón Bolívar champions Universitario de Vinto and the winners of the promotion/relegation play-off Universitario de Sucre, were both promoted for this season. The former competed in the top tier for the first time ever, while the latter returned after a 3-year absence. The promoted teams replaced Real Potosí and San José, who were relegated at the end of the previous season.

=== Stadia and locations ===
Locations of the 2022 División Profesional teams.

Team	Manager	City	Stadium	Capacity
Always Ready	(Bolivia) Óscar Villegas (caretaker)	El Alto	Municipal de Villa Ingenio	25,000
Atlético Palmaflor	(Bolivia) Denys Heredia (caretaker)	Quillacollo	Municipal de Quillacollo	6,000
Aurora	(Paraguay) Roberto Pérez	Cochabamba	Félix Capriles	32,000
Blooming	(Bolivia) Víctor Hugo Antelo	Santa Cruz	Ramón Tahuichi Aguilera	38,000
Bolívar	(Brazil) Antônio Carlos Zago	La Paz	Hernando Siles	42,000
Guabirá	(Bolivia) Mauricio Soria	Montero	Gilberto Parada	13,000
Independiente Petrolero	(Chile) Rodrigo Venegas	Sucre	Olímpico Patria	30,700
Jorge Wilstermann	(Bolivia) Alberto Illanes	Cochabamba	Félix Capriles	32,000
Nacional Potosí	(Argentina) Flavio Robatto	Potosí	Víctor Agustín Ugarte	32,105
Oriente Petrolero	(Bolivia) Erwin Sánchez	Santa Cruz	Ramón Tahuichi Aguilera	38,000
Real Santa Cruz	(Argentina) Andrés Marinangeli	Santa Cruz	Real Santa Cruz	14,000
Real Tomayapo	(Bolivia) Richard Rojas	Tarija	IV Centenario	15,000
Royal Pari	(Bolivia) Luis Marín Camacho (caretaker)	Santa Cruz	Ramón Tahuichi Aguilera	38,000
The Strongest	(Argentina) Claudio Biaggio	La Paz	Hernando Siles	42,000
Universitario de Sucre	(Paraguay) Francisco Argüello	Sucre	Olímpico Patria	30,700
Universitario de Vinto	(Paraguay) Pablo Godoy	Vinto	Municipal de Quillacollo	6,000

=== Managerial changes ===
Team	Outgoing manager	Manner of departure	Date of vacancy	Position in table	Incoming manager	Date of appointment
Torneo Apertura
Nacional Potosí	(Bolivia) Roberto Mancilla	End of caretaker spell	10 December 2021	Pre-season	(Argentina) Flavio Robatto	14 December 2021
Real Tomayapo	(Bolivia) Álvaro Peña	End of contract	11 December 2021	Pre-season	(Argentina) Víctor Hugo Andrada	21 December 2021
Jorge Wilstermann	(Uruguay) Sergio Migliaccio	Return to goalkeeping coach post	11 December 2021	Pre-season	(Chile) Miguel Ponce	13 December 2021
Real Santa Cruz	(Spain) David Perdiguero	End of contract	31 December 2021	Pre-season	(Paraguay) Daniel Farrar	11 January 2022
Always Ready	(Paraguay) Pablo Godoy	Demoted to reserve squad	29 January 2022	Pre-season	(Uruguay) Sebastián Abreu	29 January 2022
Aurora	(Bolivia) Sergio Zeballos	Resigned	19 February 2022	8th, Serie A	(Paraguay) Francisco Argüello	21 February 2022
Royal Pari	(Spain) Miguel Ángel Portugal	Sacked	27 February 2022	8th, Serie B	(Bolivia) Julio César Baldivieso	28 February 2022
Always Ready	(Uruguay) Sebastián Abreu	Mutual agreement	1 March 2022	6th, Serie B	(Bolivia) Eduardo Villegas	2 March 2022
Guabirá	(Bolivia) Víctor Hugo Antelo	Mutual agreement	11 March 2022	8th, Serie A	(Bolivia) Mauricio Soria	12 March 2022
Real Santa Cruz	(Paraguay) Daniel Farrar	Sacked	12 March 2022	7th, Serie A	(Argentina) Andrés Marinangeli	16 March 2022
Jorge Wilstermann	(Chile) Miguel Ponce	Sacked	14 April 2022	6th, Serie B	(Uruguay) Sergio Migliaccio (Note: Caretaker manager.)	15 April 2022
Universitario de Sucre	(Bolivia) Jhonny Serrudo	Sacked	1 May 2022	6th, Serie A	(Argentina) Adrián Romero	2 May 2022
Universitario de Vinto	(Bolivia) Marcelo Claros	End of contract	25 May 2022	5th, Serie B	(Spain) David Perdiguero	28 May 2022
Real Tomayapo	(Argentina) Víctor Hugo Andrada	Resigned	30 May 2022	8th, Serie B	(Bolivia) Richard Rojas	2 June 2022
Always Ready	(Bolivia) Eduardo Villegas	Sacked	2 June 2022	Quarter-finals	(Bolivia) Julio César Baldivieso	7 June 2022
Royal Pari	(Bolivia) Julio César Baldivieso	Sacked	2 June 2022	Quarter-finals	(Argentina) Luis García	6 June 2022
Jorge Wilstermann	(Uruguay) Sergio Migliaccio	End of caretaker spell	7 June 2022	6th, Serie B	(Bolivia) Álvaro Peña	7 June 2022
Torneo Clausura
The Strongest	(Argentina) Christian Díaz (Note: Gastón Ramondino was the caretaker manager for the Torneo Clausura 1st and 3rd round matches against Oriente Petrolero and Nacional Potosí and the 2022 Copa Sudamericana round of 16, due to Christian Díaz's absence for family matters.)	Sacked	12 July 2022	11th	(Argentina) Claudio Biaggio (Note: Pablo Cabanillas was the caretaker manager for the Torneo Clausura 4th round match against Universitario de Sucre.)	15 July 2022
Universitario de Sucre	(Argentina) Adrián Romero	Mutual agreement	25 July 2022	15th	(Bolivia) Álvaro Villarroel	25 July 2022
Royal Pari	(Argentina) Luis García	Sacked	28 July 2022	6th	(Argentina) Víctor Hugo Andrada	29 July 2022
Universitario de Sucre	(Bolivia) Álvaro Villarroel	End of caretaker spell	1 August 2022	15th	(Chile) Sebastián Núñez	1 August 2022
Jorge Wilstermann	(Bolivia) Álvaro Peña	Sacked	4 August 2022	10th	(Uruguay) Sergio Migliaccio	4 August 2022
Jorge Wilstermann	(Uruguay) Sergio Migliaccio	End of caretaker spell	8 August 2022	12th	(Bolivia) Alberto Illanes	8 August 2022
Blooming	(Chile) Rodrigo Venegas	Resigned	10 August 2022	10th	(Argentina) Néstor Clausen	12 August 2022
Universitario de Vinto	(Spain) David Perdiguero	Sacked	15 August 2022	16th	(Paraguay) Pablo Godoy	15 August 2022
Blooming	(Argentina) Néstor Clausen	Resigned	22 August 2022	13th	(Bolivia) Víctor Hugo Antelo	22 August 2022
Independiente Petrolero	(Argentina) Marcelo Robledo	Resigned	6 September 2022	10th	(Chile) Rodrigo Venegas (Note: Juan Pablo Grass was the caretaker manager for the Torneo Clausura 17th round match against Royal Pari.)	9 September 2022
Royal Pari	(Argentina) Víctor Hugo Andrada	Resigned	12 September 2022	15th	(Bolivia) Luis Marín Camacho	12 September 2022
Aurora	(Paraguay) Francisco Argüello	Resigned	13 September 2022	7th	(Bolivia) Christian Vargas	13 September 2022
Always Ready	(Bolivia) Julio César Baldivieso	Sacked	17 September 2022	3rd	(Bolivia) Óscar Villegas (Note: Caretaker manager until the end of the season.)	21 September 2022
Aurora	(Bolivia) Christian Vargas	End of caretaker spell	15 October 2022	7th	(Paraguay) Roberto Pérez	15 October 2022
Atlético Palmaflor	(Bolivia) Humberto Viviani	Sacked	22 October 2022	9th	(Bolivia) Denys Heredia	27 October 2022
Universitario de Sucre	(Chile) Sebastián Núñez	Mutual agreement	3 November 2022	15th	(Paraguay) Francisco Argüello	3 November 2022

== Torneo Apertura ==
=== First stage ===
==== Standings ====
===== Serie A =====
Pos	Team	Pld	W	D	L	GF	GA	GD	Pts	Qualification
1	Atlético Palmaflor	16	9	1	6	18	21	−3	28	Advance to Quarter-finals
2	The Strongest	16	7	6	3	21	11	+10	27	Advance to Quarter-finals
3	Nacional Potosí	16	7	4	5	31	24	+7	25	Advance to Quarter-finals
4	Oriente Petrolero	16	6	4	6	22	22	0	22	Advance to Quarter-finals
5	Guabirá	16	5	4	7	17	21	−4	19	
6	Real Santa Cruz	16	5	3	8	22	28	−6	18	
7	Aurora	16	4	5	7	18	21	−3	17	
8	Universitario de Sucre	16	4	4	8	17	22	−5	16	

Source: FBF, Soccerway
Rules for classification: 1) Points, 2) Goal difference, 3) Goals for, 4) Away goals for, 5) Drawing of lots.

===== Serie B =====
Pos	Team	Pld	W	D	L	GF	GA	GD	Pts	Qualification
1	Bolívar	16	12	1	3	42	9	+33	37	Advance to Quarter-finals
2	Blooming	16	8	3	5	27	30	−3	27	Advance to Quarter-finals
3	Royal Pari	16	6	5	5	32	26	+6	23	Advance to Quarter-finals
4	Always Ready	16	5	4	7	24	22	+2	19	Advance to Quarter-finals
5	Universitario de Vinto	16	5	4	7	18	29	−11	19	
6	Jorge Wilstermann	16	4	6	6	16	20	−4	18	
7	Independiente Petrolero	16	4	6	6	17	26	−9	18	
8	Real Tomayapo	16	4	6	6	14	24	−10	18	

Source: FBF, Soccerway
Rules for classification: 1) Points, 2) Goal difference, 3) Goals for, 4) Away goals for, 5) Drawing of lots.

==== Results ====
Home \ Away	CAR	APF	AUR	BLO	BOL	GUA	IPE	WIL	NAC	ORI	RSC	RTO	RPA	STR	USF	UVI
Always Ready	—	—	—	3–0	1–2	—	1–1	0–0	—	—	5–0	0–1	2–2	—	—	6–2
Atlético Palmaflor	—	—	0–1	—	—	1–0	—	—	1–0	2–1	2–1	—	—	0–3	3–1	1–0
Aurora	—	1–2	—	—	—	0–0	—	1–0	2–3	1–1	2–4	—	—	1–0	3–0	—
Blooming	1–0	—	—	—	0–7	—	4–0	3–3	—	1–2	—	2–1	1–1	—	—	5–0
Bolívar	3–0	—	—	6–0	—	—	3–1	0–1	—	—	—	1–0	6–0	1–0	—	2–0
Guabirá	—	3–0	3–2	—	—	—	—	—	1–2	0–0	1–0	—	0–3	1–3	1–0	—
Independiente Petrolero	1–2	—	—	2–3	1–0	—	—	3–2	—	—	—	1–1	0–0	—	1–0	0–0
Jorge Wilstermann	1–0	—	0–0	0–1	1–4	—	1–0	—	—	—	—	1–2	2–2	—	—	1–1
Nacional Potosí	—	1–1	2–1	—	—	3–1	—	—	—	4–2	1–0	5–0	—	1–1	1–1	—
Oriente Petrolero	—	2–1	2–0	1–2	—	2–1	—	—	4–2	—	1–2	—	—	1–1	1–0	—
Real Santa Cruz	0–1	1–2	2–2	—	—	2–2	—	—	3–2	2–1	—	—	—	1–2	0–1	—
Real Tomayapo	1–1	—	—	1–2	1–1	—	1–1	1–1	1–0	—	—	—	1–0	—	—	0–1
Royal Pari	5–1	—	—	1–1	2–1	1–3	5–1	0–2	—	—	—	6–1	—	—	—	2–1
The Strongest	—	4–1	1–0	—	0–1	0–0	—	—	1–1	2–0	1–1	—	—	—	1–1	—
Universitario de Sucre	—	2–0	1–1	—	—	2–0	1–2	—	4–3	1–1	2–3	—	—	0–1	—	—
Universitario de Vinto	2–1	0–1	—	2–1	1–4	—	2–2	2–0	—	—	—	1–1	3–2	—	—	—

Source: FBF, Soccerway
Legend: Blue = home team win; Yellow = draw; Red = away team win.

=== Knockout stage ===
==== Bracket ====
Quarter-finals
Royal Pari	0	0	0
The Strongest	3	4	7
Always Ready	2	1	3 (4)
Atlético Palmaflor (p)	1	2	3 (5)
Nacional Potosí	3	0	3 (3)
Blooming (p)	1	2	3 (5)
Oriente Petrolero	1	0	1 (6)
Bolívar (p)	0	1	1 (7)

Semi-finals
The Strongest	2	2	4
Atlético Palmaflor	1	1	2
Blooming	2	0	2
Bolívar	3	4	7

Final
The Strongest	0
Bolívar	3

==== Quarter-finals ====
Team 1	Agg.	Team 2	1st leg	2nd leg
Always Ready	3–3 (4–5 p)	Atlético Palmaflor	2–1	1–2
Royal Pari	0–7	The Strongest	0–3	0–4
Oriente Petrolero	1–1 (6–7 p)	Bolívar	1–0	0–1
Nacional Potosí	3–3 (3–5 p)	Blooming	3–1	0–2

===== First leg =====
28 May 2022	Nacional Potosí	3–1	Blooming	Potosí
15:00 UTC−4	Núñez 30'; Barbery 44'; Navarro 62'	Report	Rafinha 4'	Stadium: Víctor Agustín Ugarte; Referee: Javier Revollo

29 May 2022	Always Ready	2–1	Atlético Palmaflor	El Alto
15:00 UTC−4	Enoumba 36'; Cabrera 64'	Report	Da Silva 87'	Stadium: Municipal de Villa Ingenio; Referee: Ivo Méndez

29 May 2022	Royal Pari	0–3	The Strongest	Montero
18:00 UTC−4		Report	Arrascaita 37', 59'; Reinoso 80'	Stadium: Gilberto Parada; Referee: Nelson Barro

29 May 2022	Oriente Petrolero	1–0	Bolívar	Santa Cruz de la Sierra
19:30 UTC−4	Caire 32'	Report		Stadium: Ramón Tahuichi Aguilera; Referee: Gery Vargas

===== Second leg =====
1 June 2022	Atlético Palmaflor	2–1 (3–3 agg.) (5–4 p)	Always Ready	Cochabamba
16:00 UTC−4	Da Silva 56'; Pedraza 85'	Report	Ramallo 72'	Stadium: Félix Capriles; Referee: Carlos Arteaga
	Penalties
	Lencinas (penalty scored); Da Silva (penalty scored); Soares (penalty scored); Sánchez (penalty scored); Terrazas (penalty scored)		(penalty scored) Arce; (penalty scored) Adrián; (penalty scored) Enoumba; (penalty missed) Mamani; (penalty scored) Cabrera

1 June 2022	The Strongest	4–0 (7–0 agg.)	Royal Pari	La Paz
20:30 UTC−4	Arrascaita 17'; Triverio 53'; Gutiérrez 85' (o.g.); Reinoso 88'	Report		Stadium: Hernando Siles; Referee: Ángel Flores

2 June 2022	Bolívar	1–0 (1–1 agg.) (7–6 p)	Oriente Petrolero	La Paz
20:00 UTC−4	Uzeda 90+3'	Report		Stadium: Hernando Siles; Referee: Javier Revollo
	Penalties
	Fernández (penalty missed); Sagredo (penalty scored); Rodríguez (penalty scored); Justiniano (penalty scored); Bruno Sávio (penalty scored); Cordano (penalty scored); Villamíl (penalty scored); Uzeda (penalty scored)		(penalty scored) Caire; (penalty missed) F. Suárez; (penalty scored) Guaycochea; (penalty scored) Ríos; (penalty scored) C. Roca; (penalty scored) Quiñonez; (penalty scored) M. Suárez; (penalty missed) Guzmán

2 June 2022	Blooming	2–0 (3–3 agg.) (5–3 p)	Nacional Potosí	Santa Cruz de la Sierra
20:00 UTC−4	Durán 45+3'; Orozco 90+6'	Report		Stadium: Ramón Tahuichi Aguilera; Referee: Gery Vargas
	Penalties
	Herrera (penalty scored); Orozco (penalty scored); Cabrera (penalty scored); Arismendi (penalty scored); Tavares (penalty scored)		(penalty scored) Tobar; (penalty scored) Andia; (penalty scored) Romay; (penalty missed) Mancilla

==== Semi-finals ====
Team 1	Agg.	Team 2	1st leg	2nd leg
The Strongest	4–2	Atlético Palmaflor	2–1	2–1
Blooming	2–7	Bolívar	2–3	0–4

===== First leg =====
4 June 2022	The Strongest	2–1	Atlético Palmaflor	La Paz
15:00 UTC−4	Saucedo 44'; Triverio 79'	Report	Soares 38'	Stadium: Hernando Siles; Referee: Nelson Barro

5 June 2022	Blooming	2–3	Bolívar	Santa Cruz de la Sierra
15:00 UTC−4	Sagredo 67' (o.g.); Rafinha 85'	Report	Bruno Sávio 47'; Lima 88'; Uzeda 90+4'	Stadium: Ramón Tahuichi Aguilera; Referee: Dilio Rodríguez

===== Second leg =====
8 June 2022	Atlético Palmaflor	1–2 (2–4 agg.)	The Strongest	Cochabamba
16:00 UTC−4	Soares 60' (pen.)	Report	Triverio 53'; Amaral 82' (pen.)	Stadium: Félix Capriles; Referee: Ivo Méndez

8 June 2022	Bolívar	4–0 (7–2 agg.)	Blooming	La Paz
20:00 UTC−4	Sagredo 45+2'; Bruno Sávio 57'; Miranda 69', 79' (pen.)	Report		Stadium: Hernando Siles; Referee: Jordy Alemán

==== Final ====
12 June 2022
16:00 UTC−4

The Strongest	0–3	Bolívar
	Report	Chico 1', 32' (pen.); Bruno Sávio 70'

Estadio Hernando Siles, La Paz
Referee: Dilio Rodríguez

División de Fútbol Profesional
2022 Apertura champions

30th domestic title

=== Top scorers ===
Rank	Name	Club	Goals
1	(Brazil) Chico	Bolívar	10
2	(Bolivia) Bruno Miranda	Bolívar	9
2	(Argentina) Facundo Suárez	Oriente Petrolero	9
4	(Argentina) Andrés Chávez	Jorge Wilstermann	8
5	(Bolivia) Gilbert Álvarez	Royal Pari	7
5	(Brazil) Bruno Sávio	Bolívar	7
5	(Brazil) Wesley da Silva	Atlético Palmaflor	7
5	(Uruguay) Hugo Dorrego	Oriente Petrolero	7
5	(Colombia) Tommy Tobar	Nacional Potosí	7
10	(Argentina) Joel Amoroso	Royal Pari	6
10	(Bolivia) Mario Barbery	Nacional Potosí	6
10	(Brazil) Rafinha	Blooming	6

Source: Soccerway

== Torneo Clausura ==
The Torneo Clausura, which was originally scheduled to begin on 24 June, had its start date pushed back to 1 July due to technical issues for the implementation of VAR. The tournament was scheduled to end on 13 November 2022, but it was suspended on 21 October with six rounds to go due to civil unrest in the Santa Cruz Department and officially abandoned on 10 November 2022 in a meeting of the División Profesional's Higher Council. As a result, no champion nor runner-up were declared.

=== Standings ===
Pos	Team	Pld	W	D	L	GF	GA	GD	Pts
1	The Strongest	24	16	5	3	58	25	+33	53
2	Always Ready	24	16	3	5	52	22	+30	51
3	Bolívar	24	15	5	4	52	25	+27	50
4	Nacional Potosí	24	13	3	8	44	40	+4	42
5	Oriente Petrolero	24	11	5	8	36	26	+10	38
6	Guabirá	24	11	5	8	35	33	+2	38
7	Aurora	24	7	8	9	22	35	−13	29
8	Independiente Petrolero	24	7	7	10	34	33	+1	28
9	Atlético Palmaflor	24	5	12	7	31	34	−3	27
10	Blooming	24	7	6	11	27	35	−8	27
11	Jorge Wilstermann	24	7	6	11	24	32	−8	27
12	Real Tomayapo	24	7	5	12	25	35	−10	26
13	Royal Pari	24	7	4	13	25	35	−10	25
14	Real Santa Cruz	24	7	4	13	25	47	−22	25
15	Universitario de Sucre	24	6	5	13	24	46	−22	23
16	Universitario de Vinto	24	5	7	12	23	34	−11	22

Source: FBF, Soccerway
Rules for classification: 1) Points, 2) Playoff game (only if needed to decide championship between two teams), 3) Goal difference, 4) Goals for, 5) Away goals for, 6) Drawing of lots.

=== Results ===
Home \ Away	CAR	APF	AUR	BLO	BOL	GUA	IPE	WIL	NAC	ORI	RSC	RTO	RPA	STR	USF	UVI
Always Ready	—	—	0–1	5–0	—	2–1	—	2–1	2–1	3–0	4–0	5–0	1–0	1–3	4–0	3–0
Atlético Palmaflor	2–4	—	1–2	2–1	1–1	2–0	2–1	1–1	0–1	2–2	4–0	2–1	1–1	—	—	—
Aurora	1–1	0–0	—	1–0	1–4	1–0	1–0	—	1–5	—	1–2	—	2–1	0–0	1–1	0–2
Blooming	—	1–0	—	—	2–1	1–3	1–0	0–1	4–0	2–2	5–1	1–0	0–0	—	1–1	0–0
Bolívar	3–0	2–2	—	3–0	—	3–0	0–0	3–0	3–1	1–0	—	4–1	3–0	0–4	—	2–0
Guabirá	0–1	—	1–1	—	2–1	—	1–1	1–1	2–1	2–1	2–1	2–1	1–0	—	5–0	1–0
Independiente Petrolero	1–1	—	1–1	3–0	1–4	—	—	4–1	—	1–2	1–0	1–0	3–0	1–1	2–0	1–1
Jorge Wilstermann	—	2–1	2–0	1–0	1–1	2–2	1–3	—	—	0–1	—	0–2	2–1	0–3	5–1	2–0
Nacional Potosí	1–1	6–1	3–1	—	2–1	3–1	3–2	1–0	—	—	3–1	2–1	1–0	1–5	3–2	—
Oriente Petrolero	—	0–0	2–1	1–0	—	4–1	3–3	2–1	4–0	—	3–1	3–0	0–1	3–0	1–0	0–0
Real Santa Cruz	1–0	0–0	1–1	1–3	1–2	—	—	0–0	2–1	2–1	—	1–1	2–1	0–3	3–0	—
Real Tomayapo	0–3	2–2	3–0	1–1	0–2	—	1–0	1–0	—	—	1–2	—	2–1	0–1	1–1	4–0
Royal Pari	0–2	2–2	—	3–1	—	3–2	3–2	—	2–2	1–0	—	0–1	—	0–2	3–1	2–1
The Strongest	4–2	1–1	4–0	3–1	4–4	2–3	—	2–0	1–1	2–1	5–2	—	—	—	1–0	3–2
Universitario de Sucre	1–3	2–1	1–1	—	2–3	1–1	2–1	—	0–2	2–0	3–1	—	1–0	0–3	—	2–1
Universitario de Vinto	1–2	1–1	0–3	2–2	0–1	0–1	4–1	0–0	3–1	—	2–0	1–1	—	2–1	—	—

Source: FBF, Soccerway
Legend: Blue = home team win; Yellow = draw; Red = away team win.

=== Top scorers ===
Rank	Name	Club	Goals
1	(Argentina) Marcos Riquelme	Always Ready	19
2	(Colombia) Tommy Tobar	Nacional Potosí	15
3	(Argentina) Jonatan Cristaldo	Independiente Petrolero	12
3	(Dominican Republic) Dorny Romero	Real Santa Cruz	12
5	(Brazil) Chico	Bolívar	11
6	(Argentina) Enrique Triverio	The Strongest	10
7	(Argentina) Martín Prost	The Strongest	9
8	(Argentina) Marcos Ovejero	Universitario de Sucre	8
8	(Argentina) Facundo Suárez	Oriente Petrolero	8

Source: Soccerway

== Aggregate table ==
Due to the abandonment of the Torneo Clausura, the berths for international tournaments for the following season were awarded through aggregate table placement. In addition to this, the División Profesional's Higher Council decided that the bottom-placed team in this table at the moment the Clausura tournament was abandoned would play the relegation play-off and no teams would be directly relegated to the Bolivian Football Regional Leagues.

Pos	Team	Pld	W	D	L	GF	GA	GD	Pts	Qualification or relegation
1	Bolívar (C)	40	27	6	7	94	34	+60	87	Qualification for Copa Libertadores group stage
2	The Strongest	40	23	11	6	79	36	+43	80	Qualification for Copa Libertadores group stage
3	Always Ready	40	21	7	12	76	44	+32	70	Qualification for Copa Libertadores second stage
4	Nacional Potosí	40	20	7	13	75	64	+11	67	Qualification for Copa Libertadores first stage
5	Oriente Petrolero	40	17	9	14	58	48	+10	60	Qualification for Copa Sudamericana first stage (Note: Due to the cancellation of the 2022 Copa Bolivia by the FBF, the spot awarded to its champions (Copa Sudamericana first stage) was passed over to the aggregate table best-placed team not qualified for the Copa Libertadores.)
6	Guabirá	40	16	9	15	52	54	−2	57	Qualification for Copa Sudamericana first stage
7	Atlético Palmaflor	40	14	13	13	49	55	−6	55	Qualification for Copa Sudamericana first stage
8	Blooming	40	15	9	16	54	65	−11	54	Qualification for Copa Sudamericana first stage
9	Royal Pari	40	13	9	18	57	61	−4	48	
10	Independiente Petrolero	40	11	13	16	51	59	−8	46	
11	Aurora	40	11	13	16	40	56	−16	46	
12	Jorge Wilstermann	40	11	12	17	40	52	−12	45	
13	Real Tomayapo	40	11	11	18	39	59	−20	44	
14	Real Santa Cruz	40	12	7	21	47	75	−28	43	
15	Universitario de Vinto	40	10	11	19	41	63	−22	41	
16	Universitario de Sucre (R)	40	10	9	21	41	68	−27	39	Qualification to Relegation play-off

Source: FBF
Rules for classification: 1) Points, 2) Goal difference, 3) Goals for, 4) Away goals for, 5) Drawing of lots.
(C) Champions; (R) Relegated

== Promotion/relegation play-off ==
The relegation play-off was played by:

- Universitario de Sucre (2022 División Profesional aggregate table 16th place)
- Libertad Gran Mamoré (2022 Copa Simón Bolívar runners-up)

The winners will play in the top flight for the 2023 season.

27 November 2022
15:00 UTC−4

Libertad Gran Mamoré	3–0	Universitario de Sucre
Robles 8' (pen.), 81' (pen.); Ríos 56'	Report

Estadio Gran Mamoré, Trinidad
Referee: Santiago Silva

30 November 2022
19:00 UTC−4

Universitario de Sucre	0–3	Libertad Gran Mamoré
	Report	Mendoza 4', 49'; Milano 90'

Estadio Olímpico Patria, Sucre
Referee: Guildo Quenta

Libertad Gran Mamoré won 6–0 on aggregate and were promoted to the Bolivian Primera División. Universitario de Sucre were relegated to the Chuquisaca Football Association Championship.

== See also ==
- 2022 Copa Bolivia
