= Vigevani =

Vigevani is an Italian surname. Notable people with the surname include:

- César Vigevani (born 1974), Argentine football manager
- Fede Vigevani (born 1994 or 1995), Uruguayan YouTuber and musician
