= Adrian Romero =

Adrian Romero may refer to:

- Adrian Romero (swimmer) (born 1972), Guamanian swimmer
- Adrián Romero (Argentine footballer) (born 1975)
- Adrián Romero (Spanish footballer) (born 2006)
- Adrián Romero (Uruguayan footballer) (born 1977)
