= Juanmi Callejón =

Spanish footballer

Personal information
- Full name: Juan Miguel Callejón Bueno
- Date of birth: 11 February 1987 (age 39)
- Place of birth: Motril, Spain
- Height: 1.80 m (5 ft 11 in)
- Position: Midfielder

Youth career
- 2002–2005: Real Madrid

Senior career*
Years	Team	Apps	(Gls)
2005–2007	Real Madrid C		
2007–2008	Real Madrid B	35	(8)
2008–2010	Mallorca	1	(0)
2009–2010	→ Albacete (loan)	29	(1)
2010–2011	Córdoba	33	(3)
2011–2013	Hércules	25	(1)
2013	Levadiakos	10	(0)
2013–2017	Bolívar	142	(67)
2017–2018	Al-Ettifaq	24	(2)
2018–2019	Bolívar	88	(58)
2020–2021	Marbella	33	(8)
2021–2023	San Fernando	64	(10)
2023–2024	Orihuela	33	(10)
2024–2026	Extremadura	63	(24)
Total		580+	(192+)
- * Club domestic league appearances and goals

Juan Miguel "Juanmi" Callejón Bueno (born 11 February 1987) is a Spanish former professional footballer who played as a midfielder.

He amassed Segunda División totals of 88 games and five goals, representing four clubs in the competition. He spent most of his 21-year senior career with Club Bolívar, where he scored 125 goals in the Bolivian Primera División and finished as the league's top scorer in the 2014–15 season.

== Club career ==
Callejón was born in Motril, Province of Granada. In 2005–06, he played in 33 games and scored eight goals for Real Madrid's Juvenil A and, in March 2007, he made his senior debut for the B side, finishing the season in the Segunda División with that sole substitute appearance as they dropped down a level.

In 2007–08, Callejón played together with brother José as Real B were now in the Segunda División B. On 11 August 2008, he signed a four-year contract with RCD Mallorca, leaving in the same transfer window as his twin brother – the Balearic Islands club retained 75% of the player's rights. He made his La Liga debut on 25 September 2008 in a 2–0 home win against CD Numancia, starting in what would be his only league match in the entire campaign.

On 25 August 2009, Callejón was loaned to Albacete Balompié of the second division in a season-long move. He stayed in that league for 2010–11, joining Córdoba CF in his native Andalusia on a free transfer.

In January 2013, after 1 1/2 second-tier seasons of irregular playing time with Hércules CF, free agent Callejón signed for Levadiakos F.C. of Greece on a 1 1/2-year deal. In July, he switched clubs and countries again and joined Bolivia's Club Bolívar. He scored four goals in twelve appearances in the latter's semi-final run in the Copa Libertadores and, on 30 November 2014, he netted a hat-trick in a 6–1 victory over Club Real Potosí to keep his team on top of the Liga de Fútbol Profesional Boliviano, and him as the top scorer; in a 2–1 defeat of the same opponents on 19 March 2015, both he and teammate Jhasmani Campos were sent off for retaliation.

After finishing the 2016 Apertura as top scorer with 16 goals, including one in the final lost to The Strongest, Callejón left Bolívar in January 2017 for the Saudi Pro League's Al-Ettifaq Club, managed by compatriot Juan Carlos Garrido. Having scored twice in 26 games, he rescinded his contract in December.

Callejón returned to Bolívar in January 2018, a year after leaving them. On 17 March 2019, with a goal against Sport Boys Warnes in a 4–1 win, he became the seventh player in the league's history to reach 100 goals. Seven months later, he added five more in a 7–2 drubbing of Club Deportivo Guabirá. He finished the year's Clausura tournament with 19 goals, tied with Carlos Saucedo and Jair Reinoso as top scorer; his tally of 36 goals for the calendar year was second-most for a Spaniard abroad, after Bienvenido Marañón's 40 in the Philippines.

Callejón ended his seven years of playing abroad on 30 December 2019, when he signed an 18-month deal at third-tier Marbella FC in his home region. In July 2021, the 34-year-old joined Primera Federación side San Fernando CD on a one-year deal.

On 24 July 2024, Callejón agreed to a contract with Tercera Federación club CD Extremadura from Orihuela CF. He achieved two promotions in as many seasons and, immediately after announcing his retirement, remained at the Estadio Francisco de la Hera as assistant coach.

== Personal life ==
Callejón's twin brother, José, was also a footballer. Both were Real Madrid graduates.

== Honours ==
Real Madrid C

- Tercera División: 2005–06

Bolívar

- Bolivian Primera División: 2014 Apertura, 2015 Clausura, 2016 Apertura, 2017 Clausura, 2019 Apertura

Individual

- Bolivian Primera División top scorer: 2014–15 (23 goals)
