= César Salinas =

Bolivian football chairman and president (1961–2020)

President of the Bolivian Football Federation
- In office 2018 – 19 July 2020
- Preceded by: Rolando López Herbas; Marco Antonio Peredo Mercado (acting); Carlos Ribera (acting)
- Succeeded by: Marcos Rodríguez (acting)

Personal details
- Born: César Luis Salinas Sinka; 18 August 1961 Caquiaviri, Bolivia
- Died: 19 July 2020 (aged 58) La Paz, Bolivia
- Occupation: Football chairman

César Luis Salinas Sinka (18 August 1961 – 19 July 2020) was a Bolivian association football chairman and president.

== Life ==
Salinas was chairman of The Strongest, the oldest Bolivian football club. After he left The Strongest, his wife Inés became owner of the team. In 2018, Salinas became president of the Bolivian Football Federation. In mid-2020, Salinas was working with authorities to restart the national football league after months of hiatus due to the COVID-19 pandemic in Bolivia.

Salinas contracted COVID-19 during the COVID-19 pandemic in Bolivia in July 2020. He died in hospital on 19 July 2020, aged 58, from the effects of the virus. A letter was sent from the FIFA President to the Bolivian Football Federation praising Salinas life's work and with sadness for his death. All soccer activities conducted by the Federation were suspended from 20–22 July 2020, in mourning for his death.
