= Maximiliano Ortiz =

Bolivian footballer (born 1989)

Maximiliano Ortíz
Personal information
- Full name: Maximiliano Iván Ortíz Cuello
- Date of birth: October 11, 1989 (age 37)
- Place of birth: Córdoba, Argentina
- Height: 1.81 m (5 ft 11 in)
- Position: Centre back

Team information
- Current team: Nacional Potosí
- Number: 2

Youth career
- 2007–2010: Instituto

Senior career*
Years	Team	Apps	(Gls)
2010–2011	Instituto	3	(0)
2012–2013	Alumni de Villa María	2	(0)
2013	Racing de Córdoba	9	(0)
2014–2015	Nacional Potosí	12	(0)
2015–2016	San José	16	(1)
2016–2017	Blooming	46	(0)
2018–2020	The Strongest	72	(5)
2021–2022	Wilstermann	38	(2)
2023–	Nacional Potosí	24	(0)

International career^{‡}
2018–	Bolivia	2	(0)
- * Club domestic league appearances and goals as of 07:03 (UTC) 29 May 2024 ‡ National team caps and goals as of 6 January 2023

Maximiliano Ortíz (born 11 October 1989) is a Bolivian professional footballer who plays for Nacional Potosi in the Bolivian Primera División.

== Club career ==
From Tucumán, Argentina but with Bolivian parents, Ortiz can play in defence and attack. In 2015 Ortiz left Nacional Potosi to join Club San José.

== International career ==
On 24 March 2018, Ortiz player for the Bolivia national football team in a 1–1 draw against the Curacao national football team.
