= Luis Marín Camacho =

Bolivian footballer and manager (born 1977)

Personal information
- Full name: Luis Marín Camacho Caballero
- Date of birth: 2 May 1977 (age 49)
- Place of birth: Santa Cruz de la Sierra, Bolivia
- Position: Midfielder

Team information
- Current team: Royal Pari (reserves manager)

Youth career
- Oriente Petrolero

Senior career*
Years	Team	Apps	(Gls)
1997–2001	Oriente Petrolero		
2002–2003	Blooming		
2004	La Paz FC		
2005	Unión Tarija		
2005	Aurora		
2006–2007	Universitario de Sucre		

International career
2000–2002	Bolivia	3	(0)

Managerial career
- Oriente Petrolero (youth)
- 2018: Oriente Petrolero (interim)
- 2019: Oriente Petrolero (interim)
- 2021–: Royal Pari (reserves)
- 2021: Royal Pari (interim)
- 2022–2023: Royal Pari (interim)
- * Club domestic league appearances and goals

Luis Marín Camacho Caballero (born 2 May 1977) is a Bolivian football manager and former player who played as a midfielder. He is the current manager of Royal Pari's reserve team.

== Playing career ==
Born in Santa Cruz de la Sierra, Camacho made his senior debut with Oriente Petrolero in 1997, and remained at the club until 2001. He subsequently played for Blooming, La Paz FC, Unión Tarija, Aurora and Universitario de Sucre before retiring in 2007, aged 30.

At international level, Camacho represented the Bolivia national team on three occasions: two appearances in 2000 and one in 2002. He made his full international debut on 14 June 2000, in a 2–0 friendly loss against Slovakia.

== Coaching career ==
After retiring, Camacho worked as a youth coach at his first club Oriente Petrolero, before being named interim manager of the main squad on 21 September 2018, after Juan Manuel Llop resigned. He returned to his previous role after the appointment of Ronald Arana, but was again an interim the following 11 July, after Mauricio Soria left.

In 2021, Camacho moved to Royal Pari, as a manager of the reserve side. He was also an interim on two occasions, before renewing his contract on 21 November 2022 and being permanently appointed as manager of the club.
