= Marcos Acosta =

Paraguayan footballer (born 1991)

Personal information
- Full name: Marcos Antonio Acosta Rojas
- Date of birth: 7 December 1991 (age 34)
- Place of birth: San Estanislao, Paraguay
- Height: 1.83 m (6 ft 0 in)
- Position: Midfielder

Team information
- Current team: Manta
- Number: 5

Youth career
- 2003–2006: Sport Colombia
- 2007: Rubio Ñu
- 2007–2009: 3 de Febrero
- 2008: → Sportivo Iteño (loan)

Senior career*
Years	Team	Apps	(Gls)
2009–2013	Tacuary	136	(7)
2014	→ Vitória Setúbal (loan)	5	(0)
2014–2015	Nacional	40	(2)
2016	Rubio Ñu	41	(1)
2017	Once Caldas	37	(2)
2018	Nacional	0	(0)
2018	→ Cerro Porteño (loan)	16	(1)
2019–2020	Cerro Porteño	1	(0)
2021	River Plate (Asunción)	12	(0)
2021–	Orense	45	(2)
- * Club domestic league appearances and goals as of 24 October 2022

Marcos Antonio Acosta Rojas (born 7 December 1991), is a Paraguayan professional footballer who plays as a midfielder for Manta.

== Career ==
=== Cerro Porteño ===
After being loaned out to Cerro Porteño for the 2018 season, the club signed him permanently on a contract until 2021.
