= Estadio Municipal de Quillacollo =

Multi-use stadium in Bolivia

- Interactive map of Estadio Municipal de Quillacollo
- Location: Quillacollo, Bolivia
- Coordinates: 17°23′31.94″S 66°16′30.61″W
- Elevation: 2,551 m (8,369 ft)
- Owner: Quillacollo Government
- Capacity: 8,000
- Surface: Grass

Construction
- Opened: 2009
- Renovated: 2022

Tenants
- Arauco Prado; Universitario de Vinto

Estadio Municipal de Quillacollo, is a multi-use stadium in Quillacollo, Bolivia. It is currently used mostly for football matches, on club level by local sides Arauco Prado and Universitario de Vinto. The stadium has a capacity of 8,000 spectators and is located at an altitude of 2,551 meters (8,370 feet) above sea level.

In 2022, the stadium was renovated to host matches of the Primera División, as their main team Atlético Palmaflor were playing in the Estadio Félix Capriles. In march 2020, the stadium hosted its first professional match, as Palmaflor faced Always Ready in a Primera División contest.

In the 2022 Clausura tournament, Municipal de Quillacollo also hosted matches of Universitario de Vinto.
