= Roberto Pérez (Paraguayan footballer) =

Paraguayan football manager (born 1981)

Personal information
- Full name: Roberto Pérez Valdez
- Date of birth: 25 October 1981 (age 45)
- Place of birth: Paraguay
- Position: Defender

Senior career*
Years	Team	Apps	(Gls)
- Newell's Old Boys
- Boca Juniors
2004	1º de Mayo		

Managerial career
- Deportivo LAN
- Always Ready
- 2015–2016: Aurora (assistant)
- 2016–2017: Aurora
- 2017–2018: Universitario de Vinto
- 2018: Aurora
- 2020: Sur-Car
- 2022–2023: Aurora
- 2024: Always Ready (assistant)
- 2024: Ciudad Nueva Santa Cruz
- * Club domestic league appearances and goals

Roberto Pérez Valdez (born 25 October 1981) is a Paraguayan football manager and former player who played as a defender.

== Playing career ==
Pérez played for Newell's Old Boys and Boca Juniors in Argentina, aside from playing for Paraguayan Primera División sides. He arrived in Bolivia in 2003, and after his move to Blooming never materialized, he joined 1º de Mayo, losing in the final of the 2004 Copa Simón Bolívar with the side.

== Managerial career ==
After retiring, Pérez remained in Bolivia and managed Deportivo LAN and Always Ready before joining Roberto Pavisic's staff at Aurora in 2015, as his assistant. In 2016, he took over the team, after Pavisic left.

Pérez achieved promotion to the Primera División with Aurora, but was replaced by Miguel Ángel Zahzú. After leaving, he worked at Universitario de Vinto.

On 18 June 2018, Pérez returned to Aurora, but resigned on 7 August. On 6 October 2020, he was appointed manager of Sur-Car, and left the club at the end of the Copa Simón Bolívar

On 15 October 2022, Pérez returned to Aurora for a third spell. On 14 November 2023, he was dismissed and replaced by Mauricio Soria.

== Personal life ==
Pérez's father, also named Roberto, was also a footballer. A goalkeeper, he played in two editions of the Copa Libertadores for Sol de América and Club Nacional. His son, also named Roberto, also plays youth football.

== Honours ==
=== Manager ===
Aurora

- Copa Simón Bolívar: 2016–17
