= Luis García (football manager) =

Argentine football manager

Personal information
- Full name: Luis Osvaldo García
- Date of birth: 7 March 1988 (age 38)
- Place of birth: Buenos Aires, Argentina

Team information
- Current team: Nueva Chicago (manager)

Managerial career
- Years: Team
- 2012–2016: Nueva Chicago (youth)
- 2014–2015: Boca Juniors (youth)
- 2016: Nueva Chicago (assistant)
- 2016: Nueva Chicago (interim)
- 2016: Deportivo Cuenca (assistant)
- 2017: Atlanta (assistant)
- 2017: River Plate (youth)
- 2017–2018: Barracas Central (assistant)
- 2018–2019: Nueva Chicago (reserves)
- 2019: Colegiales
- 2019–2022: Bolivia (assistant)
- 2022: Royal Pari
- 2023: Deportivo Maipú
- 2024: Deportivo Cuenca
- 2024–2025: Atlanta
- 2026–: Nueva Chicago

Luis Osvaldo García (born 7 March 1988) is an Argentine football manager, currently in charge of Nueva Chicago.

== Career ==
After beginning his career as an under-15 manager at Nueva Chicago, García also worked at Boca Juniors' youth categories before being named assistant of Nueva Chicago in 2016. In June of that year, he was also an interim coach of the club, as manager Alejandro Nanía was unavailable.

In August 2016, García joined Gabriel Cosenza's staff at Ecuadorian side Deportivo Cuenca, as an assistant. He returned to his home country in the following year, as an assistant coach at Atlanta, and later worked for a brief period at River Plate's youth categories before being named assistant of Nanía at Barracas Central in November.

In 2018, García returned to Nueva Chicago to take over the reserve side. He left in March 2019 to join Nanía's staff at Colegiales, but was appointed manager shortly after, as Nanía was named general manager of the club. He resigned from the side after just three matches.

In August 2019, García was appointed César Farías' assistant in the Bolivia national team. He left his role in March 2022, after Farías resigned.

On 6 June 2022, García was appointed manager of Bolivian Primera División side Royal Pari, but was sacked on 28 July after just six matches. In November, he agreed to become manager of Deportivo Maipú back in his home country for the upcoming season.

On 22 December 2023, García switched teams and countries again, after being named manager of Ecuadorian Serie A side Deportivo Cuenca. He left the club on 6 April, and took over Atlanta in his home country four days later.
