= Fran Pastor =

Spanish footballer

Personal information
- Full name: Francisco Pastor Bautista
- Date of birth: 6 January 1994 (age 32)
- Place of birth: Alcalá de Henares, Spain
- Height: 1.68 m (5 ft 6 in)
- Position: Winger

Team information
- Current team: The Strongest

Youth career
- 2002–2003: Torrejón
- 2003–2013: Real Madrid

Senior career*
Years	Team	Apps	(Gls)
2013–2015	Real Madrid C	0	(0)
2013–2014	→ Compostela (loan)	8	(0)
2014–2015	→ Marino (loan)	20	(3)
2015	Guijuelo	15	(3)
2015–2016	Almería B	30	(2)
2016–2017	Logroñés	11	(0)
2017–2018	Vitoria	16	(3)
2018–2019	SS Reyes	21	(1)
2019–2020	Alcalá	11	(2)
2020–2021	Real Potosí	16	(10)
2021–	The Strongest	0	(0)

International career
2011	Spain U17	3	(1)
- * Club domestic league appearances and goals as of 16 December 2020

Francisco "Fran" Pastor Bautista (born 6 January 1994) is a Spanish footballer who plays for Bolivian club The Strongest as a right winger.

== Club career ==
Born in Alcalá de Henares, Pastor graduated from the youth academy of Real Madrid and was promoted to the C-team in early 2013. In August of the same year, he was loaned out to Segunda División B side SD Compostela. On 2 September 2014, he joined Club Marino de Luanco in the same tier on loan. On 20 September, he scored twice in a 2–2 draw against Atlético Astorga FC.

On 28 January 2015, Pastor signed with CD Guijuelo until the end of the season. In the following years, he went on to represent UD Almería B, UD Logroñés, CD Vitoria and UD San Sebastián de los Reyes in the same tier and moved to Tercera División with RSD Alcalá in September 2019.

On 11 January 2020, Pastor moved abroad and joined Bolivian side Club Real Potosí.

After one season on Real Potosí, on 4 January 2021 Paston joined to The Strongest, also in Bolivia.
