= Marcos Ferrufino =

Bolivian footballer and manager (1963–2021)

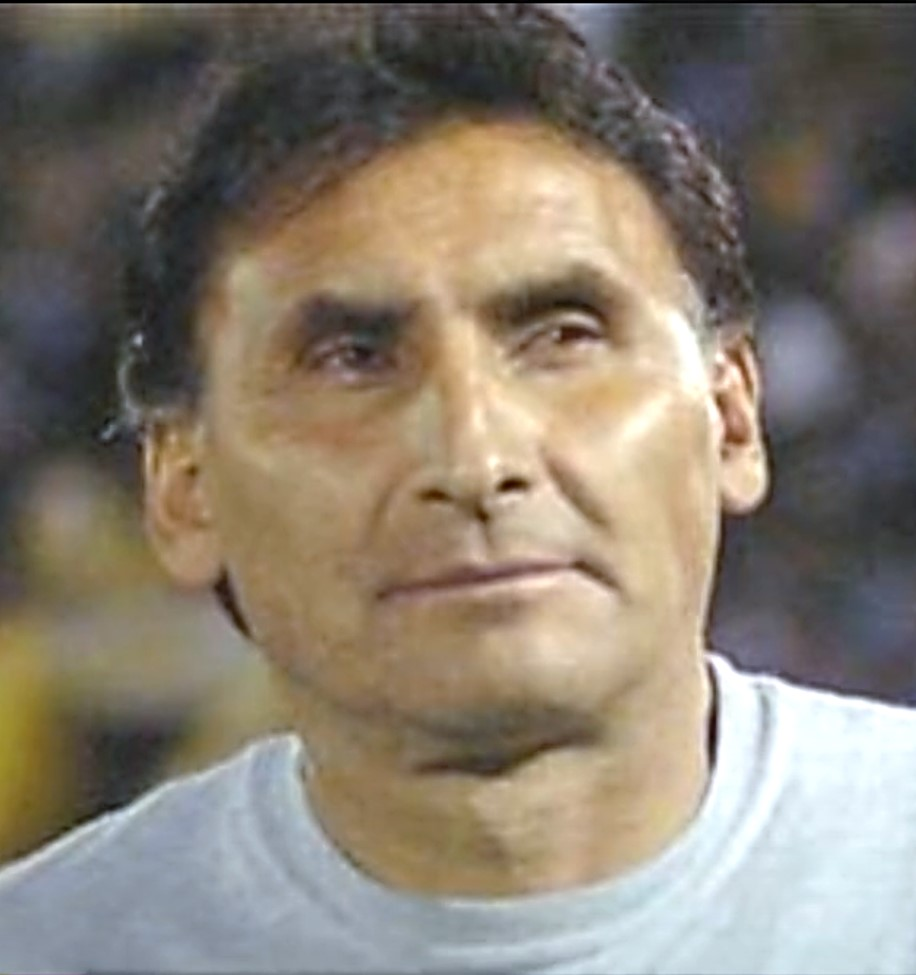
- Ferrufino in 2007

Personal information
- Full name: Marcos Rodolfo Ferrufino Pérez
- Date of birth: 25 April 1963
- Place of birth: Oruro, Bolivia
- Date of death: 25 June 2021 (aged 58)
- Place of death: Oruro, Bolivia
- Height: 1.90 m (6 ft 3 in)
- Position: Defender

Senior career*
Years	Team	Apps	(Gls)
1981–1982	31 de Octubre		
1983–1984	Always Ready		
1985–1994	Bolívar	252	(11)
1995	The Strongest	25	(2)
1996–1997	San José	45	(0)
1998	The Strongest	22	(0)
1999	Unión Central	37	(2)

International career
1989–1991	Bolivia	9	(0)

Managerial career
- 2000–2005: Bolívar (assistant)
- 2006–2007: San José (assistant)
- 2007–2008: San José
- 2009: Real Mamoré
- 2009–2010: San José
- 2011: Real Potosí
- 2011–2013: San José
- 2014–2015: Nacional Potosí
- 2016: San José
- 2017–2018: Sport Boys Warnes
- 2018–2019: Aurora
- 2019: Real Potosí
- 2020: Real Potosí
- 2021: San José
- * Club domestic league appearances and goals

Marcos Rodolfo Ferrufino Pérez (25 April 1963 – 25 June 2021) was a Bolivian football manager and player who played as a defender.

== Playing career ==
Born in Oruro, Ferrufino represented 31 de Octubre, Always Ready, Bolívar, The Strongest, San José and Unión Central in a professional output. He also played for the Bolivia national team on nine occasions between 1989 and 1991, playing in two Copa América editions.

== Managerial career ==
Shortly after retiring, Ferrufino started working as a coach, being Vladimir Soria's assistant at Bolívar. In 2006, he moved with Soria to San José, and was named manager of the club in April 2007 after Soria was sacked.

On 30 April 2008, Ferrufino announced his resignation from San José effective after the following match against Blooming on 5 May. In August 2009, he was named Real Mamoré manager, but opted to leave the club in October. Shortly after, he returned to San José.

Sacked by San José on 10 November 2010, Ferrufino was named at the helm of Real Potosí on 23 February 2011. Dismissed by the latter in August, he returned to San José for a third spell in that month.

Ferrufino was relieved of his duties in November 2013, and took over Nacional Potosí the following 18 February. He left the club roughly a year later, and returned to San José on 25 February 2016.

In November 2017, Ferrufino was named in charge of Sport Boys Warnes, but was replaced by César Vigevani the following 25 February. He was appointed manager of Aurora on 8 August 2018, but left by mutual agreement the following 7 April.

Ferrufino returned to Real Potosí on 9 October 2019, but left on 31 December as his contract expired. However, he returned to the club on 25 January 2020 after Walter Grazziosi left, but was still sacked on 20 March.

On 6 April 2021, Ferrufino returned to San José for a fifth spell, but was sacked on 16 May.

== Personal life ==
Ferrufino's son Douglas is also a footballer and a defender.

Ferrufino died on 25 June 2021, aged 58, in his hometown of Oruro after contracting COVID-19 amid the COVID-19 pandemic in Bolivia. He had spent nine days in intensive care.
