= Marcos Ovejero =

Argentine footballer

Personal information
- Full name: Marcos Ovejero
- Date of birth: 23 November 1986 (age 39)
- Place of birth: La Plata, Argentina
- Height: 1.70 m (5 ft 7 in)
- Position: Forward

Team information
- Current team: Always Ready
- Number: 61

Youth career
- 2005–2009: Caracas

Senior career*
Years	Team	Apps	(Gls)
2008–2010	Argentinos Juniors		
2008	independiente Rivadavia (loan)		(0)
2009	→ Defensores de Belgrano (loan)		
2010	Club Guarani		
2010	Flandria		
2011	Guabirá		
2011–2012	Universitario		
2012–2013	La Paz		
2013–2017	Sport Boys	67	(22)
2017	Nacional Potosi	0	(0)
2018–2022	Always Ready	91	(34)
2022	Real Santa Cruz	13	(5)
2022	Universitario	21	(8)
2023–2024	Ciudad Nueva		
2024–	Always Ready	4	(0)
- * Club domestic league appearances and goals as of 02:31, 03 April 2021 (UTC). ‡ National team caps and goals as of 12:55, 09 June 2017 (UTC)

Marcos Ovejero (born November 23, 1986, in La Plata, Argentina) is an Argentine footballer currently playing for Always Ready of the Primera División in Bolivia.
