= Carlos Leeb =

Argentine footballer and manager

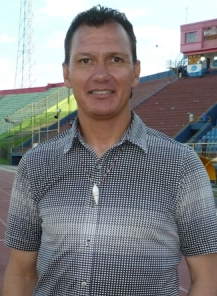
- Leeb in 2013

Personal information
- Full name: Carlos Fabián Leeb
- Date of birth: 18 July 1968 (age 58)
- Place of birth: Buenos Aires, Argentina
- Position: Forward

Senior career*
Years	Team	Apps	(Gls)
1987–1991	Independiente	13	(2)
1991	Estudiantes	5	(0)
1992–1997	Chacarita Juniors	126	(64)
1997–2002	Banfield	128	(52)
2002	Ferro Carril Oeste	3	(0)

Managerial career
- 2005–2006: Banfield
- 2007–2009: Guaraní
- 2009–2010: Universitario de Sucre
- 2010–2011: Shahrdari Bandar Abbas
- 2012: Nacional Potosí
- 2013–2014: Chacarita Juniors
- 2014–2015: Ayacucho
- 2015–2016: Sport Boys Warnes
- 2016: Ayacucho
- 2017: Nacional Potosí
- 2017–2018: Ayacucho
- 2018: Universitario de Sucre
- 2019: Sport Boys Warnes
- 2019: Destroyers
- 2021: Gran Mamoré
- * Club domestic league appearances and goals

Carlos Fabián Leeb (born 18 July 1968, in Buenos Aires) is an Argentine former football striker and a current manager. He is the son of Luis Félix Leeb, a professional footballer who played over 300 games in Argentine football.

== Playing career ==
Leeb started his career with Club Atlético Independiente in the First Division in 1987. In 1991, he had a short spell with Estudiantes de La Plata before signing for Chacarita Juniors in the 3rd division in 1992.

In 1994 Chacarita were promoted to the Second Division. Leeb became an idol at the club, scoring 64 goals in 126 games.

In 1997 Leeb transferred to fellow Second Division Club Atlético Banfield. In 2001 Banfield were promoted to the First Division, Leeb played a single season with Banfield in the top flight before moving to Ferro Carril Oeste in the Third Division where he retired from playing in 2002.

During his playing career, he suffered from a lot of injuries and underwent 14 operations.

== Coaching career ==
In 2005 Carlos Leeb started coaching Banfield first Team. He enjoyed a lot of success and in 2006 joined Club Guaraní in Paraguay making a two-year campaign with very good records. In June 2009 he took over Universitario of Bolivia, with the objectives of entering an international competition. He accomplished his objective by entering the Copa Sudamericana in 2010. He left Universario due to club's debt to player's and coaching staff. He works as the manager for Nacional Potosi of the Liga de Fútbol Profesional Boliviano since 09.08.2012.
