= Carlos Saucedo =

Bolivian former footballer (born 1979)

Personal information
- Full name: Carlos Enrique Saucido Urgell
- Date of birth: 11 September 1979 (age 47)
- Place of birth: Santa Cruz de la Sierra, Bolivia
- Height: 1.81 m (5 ft 11 in)
- Position: Striker

Youth career
- Oriente Petrolero

Senior career*
Years	Team	Apps	(Gls)
2006	Oriente Petrolero	16	(6)
2007	Bolívar	33	(18)
2008	Deportivo Quito	8	(1)
2008	Blooming	6	(7)
2009	The Strongest	28	(11)
2010	Aurora	42	(15)
2011	Independiente Medellín	6	(0)
2012–2013	San José	92	(76)
2014–2015	Saprissa	34	(14)
2015	Oriente Petrolero	18	(6)
2015–2016	Blooming	29	(10)
2016–2017	Real Potosí	17	(11)
2017	Guabirá	20	(17)
2017–2019	San José	109	(80)
2020	Royal Pari	6	(2)
2021	Real Santa Cruz	26	(6)
Total		490	(280)

International career
2007–2020	Bolivia	16	(7)
- * Club domestic league appearances and goals as of 16:50, 30 May 2021 (UTC)

Carlos Enrique Saucedo Urgel (born 11 September 1979), commonly known as Carlos Saucedo, is a Bolivian former professional footballer who played as a striker.

== Club career ==
Saucedo spent the majority of his career in Bolivia, playing for Oriente Petrolero, Bolívar, Blooming, The Strongest, Aurora, Real Potosí, Guabirá, San José, Royal Pari and Real Santa Cruz. While also abroad in Ecuadorian side for Deportivo Quito, Colombian team Independiente Medellín, as well as Deportivo Saprissa of the Costa Rican Primera División.

On 14 April 2019, Saucedo scored a four-goal haul to help San José to a 6–2 trashing of Club Always Ready in the Bolivian Primera División, becoming, at the age of 39 years and 215 days, the third oldest player in history to score a poker-trick, only behind Pablo Escobar in 2018 (39y and 299d) and Josef Bican in 1955, aged 41. According to the IFFHS, he was the 10th South American with the most goals in top divisions in the 21st century (277), as well as the second-best ranked Bolivian, only behind José Alfredo Castillo.

== International career ==
Saucedo made his international debut for the Bolivia national team on 22 August 2007, as a substitute for Augusto Andaveris, in a 1–0 away defeat against Ecuador, where he had a goal disallowed for offside.

On 13 October 2020, Saucedo started in a 2–1 loss to Argentina, becoming, at the age of 41 years and 2 days, the oldest-ever player in the history of the Bolivian national team, surpassing goalkeeper Daniel Vaca, who had set the record the previous year, aged 40 years and 10 months.

== Career statistics ==
National team	Season	Apps	Goals
Bolivia
Bolivia	2007	2	0
Bolivia	2008	0	0
Bolivia	2009	0	0
Bolivia	2010	0	0
Bolivia	2011	0	0
Bolivia	2012	3	4
Bolivia	2013	4	1
Bolivia	2014	3	2
Bolivia	2019	3	0
Bolivia	2020	1	0
Total		16	7

Scores and results list Bolivia's goal tally first.

#	Date	Venue	Opponent	Score	Result	Competition
1.	16 October 2012	Estadio Hernando Siles, La Paz	Uruguay	1–0	4–1	2014 World Cup qualifier
2.	16 October 2012	Estadio Hernando Siles, La Paz	Uruguay	3–0	4–1	2014 World Cup qualifier
3.	16 October 2012	Estadio Hernando Siles, La Paz	Uruguay	4–0	4–1	2014 World Cup qualifier
4.	15 November 2012	Estadio Ramón Tahuichi Aguilera, Santa Cruz	Costa Rica	1–1	1–1	Friendly
5.	6 February 2013	Estadio Ramón Tahuichi Aguilera, Santa Cruz	Haiti	1–1	2–1	Friendly
6.	14 October 2014	Estadio Regional de Antofagasta, Antofagasta	Chile	1–0	2–2	Friendly
7.	14 October 2014	Estadio Regional de Antofagasta, Antofagasta	Chile	2–1	2–2	Friendly

== Honours ==
Season	Club	Title
2014 Verano	Deportivo Saprissa	Costa Rican Primera División
