= Sergio Zeballos =

Bolivian football manager

Personal information
- Full name: Sergio Nelson Zeballos Martínez
- Date of birth: 26 September 1987 (age 39)
- Place of birth: Cochabamba, Bolivia

Team information
- Current team: Aurora (youth)

Managerial career
- Years: Team
- 2016–2021: Aurora (youth)
- 2020: Aurora (interim)
- 2021–2022: Aurora
- 2022: Aurora (youth)
- 2023: Pasión Celeste
- 2024: Municipal Tiquipaya
- 2025–: Aurora (youth)
- 2025: Aurora (interim)

Sergio Nelson Zeballos Martínez (born 26 September 1987) is a Bolivian football manager, currently the interim manager of Aurora's youth categories.

== Career ==
Born in Cochabamba, Zeballos began his career as an assistant at Municipal Tiquipaya's youth categories before joining Aurora in 2016, as a youth manager. On 17 December 2020, he was named interim manager of the latter, after Julio César Baldivieso was sacked.

Zeballos returned to his former role after the appointment of Humberto Viviani, but was named manager of the team on 18 October 2021, after Viviani resigned. He himself resigned from the managerial role on 19 February 2022, but returned to the role in an interim manner on 13 September.
