= Miguel Abrigo =

Argentine footballer

Personal information
- Full name: Miguel Ángel Abrigo
- Date of birth: 29 March 1974 (age 52)
- Place of birth: Basavilbaso, Argentina
- Height: 1.79 m (5 ft 10 in)
- Position: Defender

Youth career
- Newell's Old Boys

Senior career*
Years	Team	Apps	(Gls)
1995–1996	Newell's Old Boys	5	(0)
1996–1998	Argentino de Rosario	63	(3)
1998–1999	Aldosivi	25	(3)
2000–2004	Oriente Petrolero	141	(16)
2004–2006	Tiro Federal	17	(1)
2006–2007	Aldosivi	8	(0)
2007–2008	Independiente Rivadavia	6	(0)

Managerial career
- 2018–2020: Royal Pari (assistant)
- 2018: Royal Pari (interim)
- 2019: Royal Pari (interim)
- 2019: Royal Pari (interim)
- 2020: Royal Pari
- 2023: Real Santa Cruz
- * Club domestic league appearances and goals

Miguel Ángel Abrigo (born 29 March 1974) is an Argentine football coach and former player who played as a defender.

== Career ==
Abrigo competed in the Primera División Argentina for Newell's Old Boys and Tiro Federal.

He also spent some years in the Argentine lower divisions with clubs such as, Argentino de Rosario, Club Atlético Aldosivi and Independiente Rivadavia.

Moreover, he played in the Liga de Fútbol Profesional Boliviano for Oriente Petrolero between 2000 and 2004.

== Club titles ==
Season	Club	Title
2001	Oriente Petrolero	Liga de Fútbol Profesional Boliviano
