= Adrián Romero (Argentine footballer) =

Argentine football manager

Personal information
- Full name: Adrián Marcelo Romero
- Date of birth: 20 September 1975 (age 51)
- Place of birth: San Miguel de Tucumán, Argentina
- Position: Defender

Senior career*
| Years | Team | Apps | (Gls) |
| 1996–1997 | The Strongest | | |
| 1998–1999 | All Boys | | |
| 1999 | Emelec | | |
| 1999–2000 | The Strongest | | |
| 2001 | Independiente Petrolero | | |
| 2002–2003 | Deportivo Pereira | | |
| 2004–2005 | La Paz FC | 39 | (4) |
| 2006–2007 | Atlético Tucumán | 26 | (2) |
| 2007 | The Strongest | | |
| 2008 | Chacarita Juniors | | |

Managerial career
- 2016–2017: Tristán Suárez
- 2017–2018: Argentino de Quilmes
- 2018: Universitario de Sucre
- 2019: Universitario de Sucre
- 2020: Deportivo FATIC
- 2022: Universitario de Sucre
- * Club domestic league appearances and goals

Adrián Marcelo Romero (born 20 September 1975) is an Argentine football manager and former player who played as a defender.

== Playing career ==
Born in San Miguel de Tucumán, Romero played in Bolivia, Ecuador and Colombia aside from his home country. He notably represented All Boys in his home country, and The Strongest (three spells), Independiente Petrolero and La Paz FC in Bolivia. He retired in 2008 with Chacarita Juniors.

== Managerial career ==
After retiring, Romero worked as a youth manager and was also an assistant of Pedro Monzón on several occasions. On 22 August 2018, he returned to Bolivia after being named manager of Universitario de Sucre in the Copa Simón Bolívar.

On 31 October 2020, Romero was appointed Deportivo FATIC manager. On 3 May 2022, he returned to Universitario de Sucre, with the club now in the Primera División.

On 25 July 2022, after just one win in nine matches, Romero left Universitario on a mutual agreement.
