= Pablo Escobar (footballer, born 1979) =

Paraguayan-born Bolivian footballer

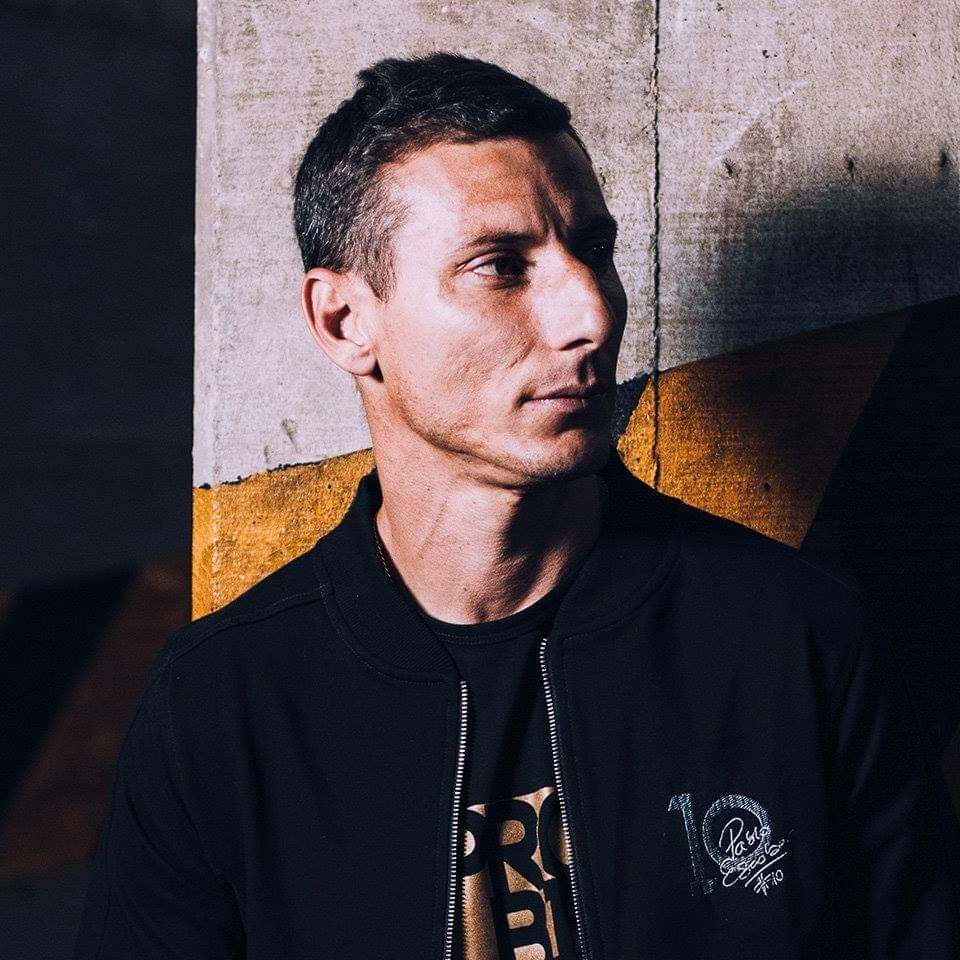
- Pablo Escobar

Personal information
- Full name: Pablo Daniel Escobar Olivetti
- Date of birth: 23 February 1979 (age 47)
- Place of birth: Asunción, Paraguay
- Height: 1.77 m (5 ft 10 in)
- Positions: Attacking midfielder; second striker

Team information
- Current team: Bolivia U-17 (head coach)

Youth career
- 1991–1998: Olimpia

Senior career*
Years	Team	Apps	(Gls)
1999–2000	Olimpia	23	(1)
2000–2003	Gimnasia de Jujuy	34	(3)
2004	San José	38	(22)
2005–2008	The Strongest	96	(47)
2006	→ Cerro Porteño (loan)	28	(4)
2008	→ Ipatinga (loan)	11	(3)
2009	→ Santo André (loan)	25	(3)
2010	→ Mirassol (loan)	9	(4)
2010	Ponte Preta	21	(3)
2011	Botafogo SP	13	(0)
2011–2018	The Strongest	277	(157)

International career
2008–2018	Bolivia	23	(6)

Managerial career
- 2019: The Strongest
- 2019–2020: Sol de América
- 2020–2023: Bolivia (assistant)
- 2021–2023: Bolivia U20
- 2022: Bolivia (interim)
- 2023–: Bolivia U17
- * Club domestic league appearances and goals

Pablo Daniel Escobar Olivetti (Spanish pronunciation: [ˈpaβlo eskoˈβaɾ], born 23 February 1979) is a football coach and former player who played as an attacking midfielder or second striker. He is the current head coach of the Bolivia national under-20 team.

Born in Paraguay, Escobar represented Bolivia at international level.

== Club career ==
Escobar started his career in the youth divisions of Olimpia, and eventually made his way to the first team although he spent more time playing for the reserves. In 2000, he was signed by the Argentine side Gimnasia y Esgrima de Jujuy, and after three years with the club, he relocated to Bolivia to play for San José in 2004. His good conditions rewarded him with a transfer to The Strongest the following season. He also had a brief stint at Cerro Porteño in 2006 before returning to The Strongest for a second spell.

On 28 August 2008, Escobar joined Brazilian club Ipatinga. Escobar joined Santo André of Brazil on 5 January 2009. He joined Mirassol in January 2010. After about a year, he signed a 3-year contract with Paulista (Brazilian) side Botafogo-SP.

On 23 February 2017, Escobar scored a second-half hat-trick against Unión Española in the second leg of the final stage of the 2017 Copa Libertadores qualifying stages, becoming, at the age of 38 years and 226 days, the oldest hat-trick scorer in the competition's history. In December 2018, he scored two four-goal hauls in trashings of Sport Boys Warnes (6–0) and Club Blooming (8–0), becoming, at the age of 39 years and 299 days, the oldest player to score a poker in the 21st century (a record since surpassed by Óscar Cardozo in 2023), as well as the second in history, only behind Josef Bican in 1955, aged 41. He also became the first player to score two pokers in top-tier matches after turning 38 since Real Madrid's Ferenc Puskás in 1965.

== International career ==
In August 2008, Escobar received Bolivian citizenship in order to play for the Bolivia national football team. Between 2008 and 2017 Escobar made 25 appearances for Bolivia, netting 6 goals. 19 of his appearances were in FIFA World Cup qualification matches.

=== International goals ===
Scores and results list Bolivia's goal tally first.

No	Date	Venue	Opponent	Score	Result	Competition
1.	2 September 2011	Estadio Nacional de Lima, Lima, Peru	Peru	1–0	2–2	Friendly
2.	9 June 2012	Estadio Hernando Siles, La Paz, Bolivia	Paraguay	2–0	3–1	2014 FIFA World Cup qualification
3.	9 June 2012	Estadio Hernando Siles, La Paz, Bolivia	Paraguay	3–0	3–1	2014 FIFA World Cup qualification
4.	1 September 2016	Estadio Hernando Siles, La Paz, Bolivia	Peru	1–0	2–0	2018 FIFA World Cup qualification
5.	11 October 2016	Estadio Hernando Siles, La Paz, Bolivia	Ecuador	1–0	2–2	2018 FIFA World Cup qualification
6.	11 October 2016	Estadio Hernando Siles, La Paz, Bolivia	Ecuador	2–0	2–2	2018 FIFA World Cup qualification
