= Ronald Arana =

Bolivian footballer (born 1977)

Personal information
- Full name: Ronald Arana Céspedes
- Date of birth: 18 January 1977 (age 49)
- Place of birth: Santa Cruz de la Sierra, Bolivia
- Height: 1.77 m (5 ft 10 in)
- Position: Defender

Team information
- Current team: Bolívar (reserves manager)

Youth career
- Tahuichi Academy

Senior career*
Years	Team	Apps	(Gls)
1996	Destroyers		
1997–1998	Oriente Petrolero	43	(6)
1999	→ The Strongest (loan)	31	(3)
2000–2005	Oriente Petrolero	216	(16)
2006	→ Rosario Central (loan)	0	(0)
2006	→ La Paz (loan)	11	(0)
2007	Oriente Petrolero	17	(2)
2008	Bolívar	18	(0)
2009	Real Mamoré	18	(0)
2010	Guabirá	31	(1)
2011	La Paz	12	(1)

International career
1999–2007	Bolivia	20	(0)

Managerial career
- 2018: Oriente Petrolero
- 2019: Guabirá
- 2025–: Bolívar (reserves)
- 2026: Bolívar (interim)
- * Club domestic league appearances and goals

Ronald Arana Céspedes (born 18 January 1977) is a Bolivian football manager and former player who played as a defender. He is the current manager of Bolívar's reserve team.

== Club career ==
Born in Santa Cruz de la Sierra, Arana began his professional career with Club Destroyers in 1996. The following year he transferred to Oriente Petrolero where he spent most of his career. Arana also have had brief spells playing for The Strongest, La Paz F.C., Bolívar, Municipal Real Mamoré and Guabirá, as well as, Argentine club Rosario Central.

== International career ==
He made his debut for the Bolivia national team in 1999, and has been capped 20 times since. He represented his country in 7 FIFA World Cup qualification matches and played at the 1999 FIFA Confederations Cup.

== Honours ==
- Liga de Fútbol Profesional Boliviano: 2

2001, 2004 (C) (Oriente Petrolero)
