= Marcos Riquelme =

Argentine footballer

Personal information
- Full name: Marcos Daniel Riquelme
- Date of birth: 18 February 1988 (age 38)
- Place of birth: Buenos Aires, Argentina
- Height: 1.79 m (5 ft 10 in)
- Position: Striker

Team information
- Current team: Real Pilar
- Number: 9

Youth career
- Fénix

Senior career*
Years	Team	Apps	(Gls)
2011–2014	Fénix	72	(28)
2012–2013	→ Olimpo (loan)	6	(0)
2014–2016	Palestino	59	(21)
2016–2017	Audax Italiano	22	(10)
2017–2021	Bolívar	100	(67)
2019	→ Universidad de Chile (loan)	8	(1)
2021	Sporting Cristal	18	(8)
2022–2023	Always Ready	44	(23)
2023–2024	Oriente Petrolero	33	(10)
2025–	Real Pilar	24	(9)
- * Club domestic league appearances and goals as of 13 October 2025

Marcos Daniel Riquelme (born 18 February 1988) is an Argentine footballer that currently plays for Real Pilar.

== Career ==
Riquelme has mainly stood out in Bolivian football. He has also played for Chilean clubs Palestino, Audax Italiano and Universidad de Chile and the Peruvian club Sporting Cristal in 2021.

In January 2025, Riquelme returned to Argentina and joined Real Pilar.
