= Clásico Paceño =

Bolivian football rivalry between Club Bolivar and The Strongest

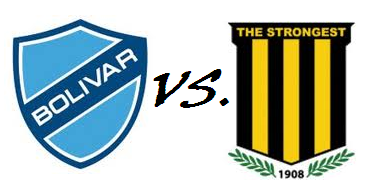
- Other names: Bolivian Derby, Clásico Boliviano, Clasico de La Paz
- Location: La Paz, Bolivia
- Teams: Club Bolivar; The Strongest
- First meeting: Bolívar 0–0 The Strongest; La Paz Football Association (17 October 1927)
- Latest meeting: Bolívar 4–4 The Strongest; 2024 Bolivian Primera División (25 February 2024)
- Stadiums: Estadio Hernando Siles

Statistics
- Most wins: Club Bolivar (163)
- Most player appearances: Vladimir Soria (83)
- Top scorer: William Ferreira (23)

Bolívar	The Strongest

The Clásico Paceño is considered an important football game in the First Bolivian Division, because in this match the two oldest and the most successful teams of the First Bolivian Division play, the clubs Bolívar and The Strongest, both from the administrative capital of Bolivia, La Paz; hence the name Paceño.

The first official Paceño derby in history was played on 17 October 1927, they met on the Hippodrome court with a final draw, 0:0. It is the match that has been played in all Bolivian soccer competitions, from amateurism, professionalism, in the Bolivian Professional Soccer League, and even in international tournaments such as Copa Sudamericana and the Copa Libertadores.

In 2014, the Paceño derby was listed as "one of the 25 most explosive rivalries in the world" by the specialized magazine Football Derbies. The criteria that were used to show the great rivalry between both teams has to do with the time of existence of the classic, the number of games, the importance of duels, the public image they carry, the repercussion — nationally and internationally, and even a historical account of the episodes of violence.

Although the confrontations between both rivals date back to the year 1930, the rivalry between these two teams did not become evident until the disappearance of the University of La Paz from the foreground of Bolivian football at the end of the years 1960 of the 20th century.

== History ==
=== Antecedents ===
The great rivalries in Bolivian football are born out of the confrontations produced within the Departmental Football Associations, the only organizing bodies of football at first and then with great importance until the creation of the League in 1977.

As a result, the main rivalries between the main Bolivian teams are often between teams from the same city. Thus, in La Paz, The Strongest and Bolívar face each other, and this is the one with the longest history, teams that are the most representative of La Paz and the oldest in the Bolivian First Division, as their clashes date back to 1927. Between them, they have 31 league titles in 48 different tournaments, with the rest being shared among 17 other teams (9 of which have disappeared from professional football's top level).

At the same time, the great success of the teams from La Paz and the great importance of their Association, especially in the first 60 years of football in Bolivia, also made them very popular in some cities of the country, attracting great attention in some departments of western Bolivia and also drawing the attention of the different media abroad.

=== Origin ===
The origin of the great rivalry of football in La Paz dates back to the early days of the sport in the city of La Paz when football was played in an organized way. As there was still no regulatory body for the practice of the sport, the different clubs challenged a certain rival to a series of matches.

Thus, the first great rivalry of football in La Paz was between the first club of the city, La Paz FBC, founded in 1899, and the Bolivian Rangers, founded in 1902. A short-lived rivalry ended with the demise of the former, while the latter was overshadowed by Thunder Foot Ball Club, in 1904.

When Thunders FBC disappeared in 1908, its place as the most popular team was taken by The Strongest who disputed first place with Nimbles Sport Association, a team founded in 1909 and with whom they played the first organized tournament in Bolivian history during 1911 and who was their first great historical rivals. The final of the 1911 tournament was contested by these two clubs, with The Strongest emerging victorious.

Subsequently, in the early years of the La Paz Football Association, it was the Colegio Militar team that was The Strongest's most formidable rival, eventually overshadowing Nimbles Sport Association within a few years, for by 1915 the Clásico Paceño featured Colegio Militar against The Strongest.

=== The Strongest's supremacy in the first Bolivian tournament ===
The first La Paz derby was played between The Strongest and Club Colegio Militar. By 1911, the rivalry between the two had reached epic proportions, dividing the city into two antagonistic sides. That same year, the Prefecture of La Paz decided to organize the first official football championship in the history of Bolivia, the Copa Prefectural. Both teams were prominent protagonists of the competition and in the end The Strongest became the first champion of Bolivian football.

In 1914, the football teams of the city of La Paz decided to institutionalize the practice of the sport, for which the first governing body of football in Bolivia, the La Paz Football Association, was founded. The LPFA organized the first proper Bolivian football tournament that year and the winner was once again The Strongest, with their fierce rivals finishing second. In 1915 the situation was reversed and Colegio Militar was able to taste its first championship, with The Strongest finishing second.

However, from 1916, began an era of absolute dominance of The Strongest in Bolivian football. The Aurinegro won all the competitions organized in the following decade (1916-I, 1916-II, 1917, 1922, 1923, 1923, 1924, 1925, there were no tournaments between 1918 and 1921), while their rival would enter a frank decline that would end in their disappearance at the beginning of the 1930s.

=== A decade in front of Universitario (1920–1930) ===
From the beginning of the 1920s, one team began to stand out on the side of those trying to wrest supremacy from The Strongest: Universitario. Between 1922 and 1925, Universitario won four LPFA runner-up titles behind The Strongest who won them all. The team's supporters, sponsored by the Higher University of San Andrés, began to grow thanks to this, recruiting most of the fans from the Colegio Militar.

The Strongest-Universitario rivalry is the longest lasting in Bolivian football history and spanned almost five decades, with The Strongest winning 14 championships and Universitario 2. Paradoxically, the greatest achievement in Universitario's history came in 1969, when they won the newly established "Campeonato Nacional" (national championship), after which the team went into a rapid and precipitous institutional decline, which culminated in their losing their status the following year.

=== Bolívar's rise ===
In 1925, the Club Bolívar was founded, the rapid decline of Universitario and the runners-up finishes achieved by the celestes, in 1927 (after Nimbles) and 1930 (after The Strongest), encouraged the fans to define the new clásico paceño. Thus, the first derby as such (when Universitario had ceased to be the other big team in La Paz) was played on 24 April 1932, when Bolivar won by the narrowest of margins. In addition, Bolívar became stronger from the end of the 1930s onwards, competing in tournaments against the most important team, The Strongest. Bolívar won four consecutive titles, two of them against The Strongest (1939, 1940, 1941 and 1942), as well as a string of runner-up finishes, four of which were against The Strongest (1938, 1943, 1945, 1946, 1947 and 1949).

By the 1950s, there were no doubts about the teams that made up the La Paz derby, and by the beginning of the decade, the "academic" superiority over the "atigrado" team began to be marked.
