= Mauricio Soria =

Bolivian footballer and manager (born 1966)

Personal information
- Full name: Mauricio Ronald Soria Porillo
- Date of birth: 1 June 1966 (age 60)
- Place of birth: Cochabamba, Bolivia
- Height: 1.80 m (5 ft 11 in)
- Position: Goalkeeper

Senior career*
Years	Team	Apps	(Gls)
1984–1987	Aurora		(0)
1987–1988	The Strongest		(0)
1989	Always Ready		(0)
1990	Destroyers		(0)
1991	Oriente Petrolero		(0)
1992–1993	Destroyers		(0)
1994–1996	Bolívar		(0)
1997–2002	Wilstermann		(0)
2002–2004	The Strongest		(0)
2005	Aurora		(0)

International career
1990–2003	Bolivia	23	(0)

Managerial career
- 2006–2007: Wilstermann
- 2007–2008: Real Potosí
- 2011–2012: The Strongest
- 2012: Wilstermann
- 2013: Real Potosí
- 2013–2014: Blooming
- 2014: Bolivia (interim)
- 2015: Bolivia
- 2016: The Strongest
- 2016: Blooming
- 2016–2018: Bolivia
- 2019: Oriente Petrolero
- 2019–2020: The Strongest
- 2021: Wilstermann
- 2022–2023: Guabirá
- 2023–2024: Aurora
- 2025–2026: Blooming
- 2026: Always Ready
- * Club domestic league appearances and goals

Mauricio Ronald Soria Portillo (born 1 June 1966) is a Bolivian football manager and former player who played as a goalkeeper.

== Playing career ==
Soria was born in Cochabamba. At club level, he played for Wilstermann, Destroyers, The Strongest, Bolívar and Aurora in his country.

Between 1990 and 2002, Soria capped for the Bolivia national team in 23 games. He was part of the squad in Copa America 1991, Copa America 1995 and Copa America 1997 when Bolivia finished as runners-up.

== Managerial career ==
His debut as a manager occurred in July 2006, and it could not have been any better as Wilstermann won the 2006 Segundo Torneo league championship on December 3 of that year under his lead. During 2007 while managing Real Potosí, Soria won his second league title as he secured the 2007-Apertura for the lilas. He also had a short spell with the Bolivia national team as the manager participating in Copa America 2015 held in Chile. He was waived by the Bolivian Football Federation at the conclusion of the tournament and appointed Julio César Baldivieso in his place.
