= César Vigevani =

Argentine football manager

Personal information
- Full name: César Eduardo Vigevani Martínez
- Date of birth: 30 August 1974 (age 52)
- Place of birth: Buenos Aires, Argentina

Managerial career
- Years: Team
- 2007–2010: River Ecuador
- 2011: LDU Portoviejo
- 2011–2012: Imbabura (sporting director)
- 2012: Imbabura
- 2013–2014: Mushuc Runa
- 2014: LDU Portoviejo
- 2015: Unión San Felipe
- 2015–2016: Cobreloa
- 2017: Unión San Felipe
- 2017: Huachipato
- 2018: Sarmiento Junín U20
- 2018: Sport Boys Warnes
- 2019: Bolívar
- 2020: Deportivo Binacional
- 2022: Cienciano
- 2023: Alvarado
- 2023: Motagua
- 2025: Nacional Potosí

César Eduardo Vigevani Martínez (born 30 August 1974) is an Argentine professional football manager.

== Coaching career ==
César Vigevani started coaching career with youth teams of River Plate club in Argentina. His first stint as a manager of the main team was with River Ecuador in 2008. He managed clubs in Various countries like Peru, Chile, Ecuador, Bolivia. He managed famous clubs like Bolívar in Bolivia and Binacional in Peru.
