= 2026 FBF División Profesional =

División Profesional
- Season: 2026
- Dates: 3 April – 13 December 2026
- Copa Libertadores: Bolívar; Always Ready
- Matches: 205
- Goals: 625 (3.05 per match)
- Top goalscorer: Enrique Triverio (21 goals)
- Biggest home win: Bolívar 6–0 Real Tomayapo (26 April); Always Ready 6–0 Guabirá (13 September)
- Biggest away win: Real Oruro 0–6 Always Ready (14 July)
- Highest scoring: Bolívar 5–2 Real Oruro (3 April); U. de Vinto 5–2 ABB (21 April); The Strongest 4–3 U. de Vinto (21 August); Blooming 6–1 ABB (12 September)
- All statistics correct as of 22 November 2026 (2 of 3 matches finished).

The 2026 FBF División Profesional season, officially known as the 2026 LIGA 1XBET.TV for sponsoring purposes, is the 48th season of the División Profesional del Fútbol Boliviano, Bolivia's top-flight football league and the eighth season under División de Fútbol Profesional management. The season began on 3 April and is scheduled to end on 13 December 2026.

Always Ready are the defending champions.

On 10 June 2026, the tournament was suspended by the Bolivian Football Federation due to the 2026 Bolivian protests, which disrupted the scheduling of previous matchdays. The competition resumed on 7 July.

== Format ==
The format for the season was first discussed at a meeting of the División Profesional's Council held on 12 January 2026, in which the clubs voted to keep the double round-robin format for the tournament (30 matchdays), starting from the first weekend of April.

The competition format was ultimately confirmed on 23 March 2026, when it was also announced that qualification for the 2027 edition of the Copa Libertadores will be awarded to the top three teams at the end of the season, with the league champions and runners-up entering the group stage, whilst the next best three teams will qualify for the Copa Sudamericana. The team placing last at the end of the season will be relegated, with the team placing second-from-last playing the promotion/relegation play-off series against the Copa Simón Bolívar runners-up.

== Teams ==
Sixteen teams compete in the league for the 2026 season, those being the top 14 teams from the previous season, along with the 2025 Copa Simón Bolívar champions Real Potosí and the winners of the promotion/relegation play-off ABB, who also competed in the 2025 División Profesional.

Having competed in the top flight for the last time in 2021, Real Potosí achieved promotion on 7 December 2025 by defeating San Juan and winning the Copa Simón Bolívar title. They replaced Jorge Wilstermann, who were relegated to the Cochabamba regional league after ending last in the previous División Profesional tournament.

=== Stadia and locations ===
Locations of the 2026 División Profesional teams.

Team	City	Stadium	Capacity
ABB	El Alto	Municipal de Villa Ingenio	22,000
Always Ready	El Alto	Municipal de Villa Ingenio	22,000
Aurora	Cochabamba	Félix Capriles	32,000
Blooming	Santa Cruz de la Sierra	Ramón Tahuichi Aguilera	38,000
Bolívar	La Paz	Hernando Siles	42,000
Guabirá	Montero	Gilberto Parada	13,000
GV San José	Oruro	Jesús Bermúdez	33,000
Independiente Petrolero	Sucre	Olímpico Patria	30,700
Nacional Potosí	Potosí	Víctor Agustín Ugarte	32,105
Oriente Petrolero	Santa Cruz de la Sierra	Ramón Tahuichi Aguilera	38,000
Real Oruro	Oruro	Jesús Bermúdez	33,000
Real Potosí	Potosí	Víctor Agustín Ugarte	32,105
Real Tomayapo	Tarija	IV Centenario	15,000
San Antonio Bulo Bulo	Entre Ríos	Carlos Villegas	17,000
The Strongest	La Paz	Hernando Siles	42,000
Universitario de Vinto	Cochabamba	Félix Capriles (Note: Used as home stadium for the season since Universitario's stadium Estadio Hipólito Lazarte does not meet FBF requirements for a professional match.)	32,000

=== Personnel and kits ===
Team	Manager	Kit manufacturer	Main shirt sponsors
ABB	(Bolivia) Jaime Jemio	Drei	
Always Ready	(Paraguay) Pablo Godoy	Marathon	UTB
Aurora	(Uruguay) Enrique Díaz	Adidas	Tecnoacero
Blooming	(Argentina) Cristian Paulucci	Marathon	Gree
Bolívar	(Colombia) Alejandro Restrepo	Marathon	Aldeas Infantiles SOS Bolivia
Guabirá	(Bolivia) Leonardo Eguez	Forte	Celina, Ingenio Guabirá, Grupo Paz
GV San José	(Brazil) Artur Costa	Arce	4life Grains, Paceña
Independiente Petrolero	(Bolivia) Juan Pablo Grass	Red White	UTB, Fancesa
Nacional Potosí	(Bolivia) Dayler Gutiérrez	Oxígeno Wear	Banco Económico, Ingenio San Silvestre
Oriente Petrolero	(Paraguay) Gustavo Florentín	Marathon	Yango, Finesse, GAC Motor
Real Oruro	(Argentina) Nicolás Straccia	Arce	
Real Potosí	(Colombia) Giancarlo Umaña	Oxígeno Wear	Entel, BCP, Altavida
Real Tomayapo	(Argentina) Jorge Alfonso	Oxígeno Wear	Altavida
San Antonio Bulo Bulo	(Bolivia) Edivaldo Rojas	Oxígeno Wear	
The Strongest	(Brazil) Antônio Carlos Zago	Marathon	Solucredit
Universitario de Vinto	(Bolivia) Adrián Barral (caretaker)	Marathon	UTB

=== Managerial changes ===
Team	Outgoing manager	Manner of departure	Date of vacancy	Position in table	Incoming manager	Date of appointment
GV San José	(Bolivia) Jorge Wuinch	End of caretaker spell	13 December 2025	Pre-season	(Argentina) Pablo Rubinich	10 January 2026
Universitario de Vinto	(Bolivia) Adrián Barral	End of caretaker spell	13 December 2025	Pre-season	(Argentina) Marcelo Straccia	4 January 2026
Oriente Petrolero	(Argentina) Víctor Hugo Andrada	End of contract	14 December 2025	Pre-season	(Spain) David González	29 December 2025
Guabirá	(Argentina) Marcelo Straccia	Resigned	16 December 2025	Pre-season	(Bolivia) Joaquín Monasterio	19 December 2025
The Strongest	(Bolivia) Juan Carlos Paz	End of caretaker spell	18 December 2025	Pre-season	(Bolivia) Eduardo Villegas	22 December 2025
Real Tomayapo	(Spain) Juan Cortés	Resigned	1 January 2026	Pre-season	(Argentina) Gabriel Nasta	14 January 2026
Aurora	(Bolivia) Sergio Zeballos (Bolivia) Edward Zenteno	End of caretaker spell	5 January 2026	Pre-season	(Colombia) Giancarlo Umaña	6 January 2026
ABB	(Bolivia) Víctor Hugo Mamani	End of caretaker spell	10 January 2026	Pre-season	(Chile) Sebastián Núñez (Note: The club originally announced Alberto Illanes as manager on 10 January, but later removed the announcement.)	16 January 2026
Real Potosí	(Brazil) Cleibson Ferreira	Sacked	2 March 2026	Pre-season	(Colombia) Flabio Torres	6 March 2026
Nacional Potosí	(Bolivia) Leonardo Eguez	Sacked	6 March 2026	Pre-season	(Colombia) Alexis Márquez	13 March 2026
Guabirá	(Bolivia) Joaquín Monasterio	Mutual agreement	8 March 2026	Pre-season	(Bolivia) Leonardo Eguez	9 March 2026
Independiente Petrolero	(Bolivia) René Hinojosa	Mutual agreement	13 March 2026	Pre-season	(Brazil) Thiago Leitão	16 March 2026
San Antonio Bulo Bulo	(Colombia) Diómedes Peña	Sacked	15 March 2026	Pre-season	(Spain) Juan Cortés	16 March 2026
The Strongest	(Bolivia) Eduardo Villegas	Mutual agreement	18 March 2026	Pre-season	(Bolivia) Juan Carlos Paz (Note: Caretaker manager(s).)	19 March 2026
The Strongest	(Bolivia) Juan Carlos Paz	End of caretaker spell	5 April 2026	7th	(Ecuador) Sixto Vizuete	5 April 2026
Real Tomayapo	(Argentina) Gabriel Nasta	Sacked	6 April 2026	15th	(Uruguay) Felipe de la Riva	9 April 2026
GV San José	(Argentina) Pablo Rubinich	Sacked	14 April 2026	15th	(Bolivia) Jorge Wuinch	16 April 2026
Bolívar	(Argentina) Flavio Robatto	Resigned	21 April 2026	1st	(Bolivia) Vladimir Soria (Bolivia) Ronald Arana	23 April 2026
Real Oruro	(Argentina) Marcelo Robledo	Mutual agreement	27 April 2026	15th	(Paraguay) Néstor Colinas	27 April 2026
Always Ready	(Bolivia) Julio César Baldivieso	Sacked	3 May 2026	1st	(Argentina) Marcelo Straccia	3 May 2026
Blooming	(Bolivia) Mauricio Soria	Resigned	3 May 2026	7th	(Bolivia) Raúl Gutiérrez (Note: Originally as caretaker manager, appointed on a permanent basis on 5 May 2026.)	3 May 2026
Universitario de Vinto	(Argentina) Marcelo Straccia	Mutual agreement	3 May 2026	13th	(Bolivia) Wálter Flores (Note: Yimmy Gutiérrez was the caretaker manager for the 5th round match against Blooming.)	4 May 2026
GV San José	(Bolivia) Jorge Wuinch	End of caretaker spell	7 May 2026	14th	(Bolivia) Julio César Baldivieso	7 May 2026
Blooming	(Bolivia) Raúl Gutiérrez	Resigned	13 May 2026	6th	(Bolivia) Erwin Sánchez	15 May 2026
Oriente Petrolero	(Spain) David González	Sacked	15 May 2026	6th	(Paraguay) Gustavo Florentín	26 May 2026
Real Tomayapo	(Uruguay) Felipe de la Riva	Resigned	17 May 2026	15th	(Bolivia) René Hinojosa	23 May 2026
Bolívar	(Bolivia) Vladimir Soria (Bolivia) Ronald Arana	End of caretaker spell	21 May 2026	2nd	(Colombia) Alejandro Restrepo	21 May 2026
Always Ready	(Argentina) Marcelo Straccia	Sacked	28 May 2026	3rd	(Bolivia) Mauricio Soria	29 May 2026
San Antonio Bulo Bulo	(Spain) Juan Cortés	Sacked	29 June 2026	12th	(Bolivia) Edivaldo Rojas	29 June 2026
Nacional Potosí	(Colombia) Alexis Márquez	Sacked	16 July 2026	6th	(Bolivia) Eduardo Villegas	16 July 2026
The Strongest	(Ecuador) Sixto Vizuete	Resigned	23 July 2026	2nd	(Bolivia) Juan Carlos Paz (Bolivia) Daniel Vaca	23 July 2026
The Strongest	(Bolivia) Juan Carlos Paz (Bolivia) Daniel Vaca	End of caretaker spell	5 August 2026	2nd	(Brazil) Antônio Carlos Zago	3 August 2026
Independiente Petrolero	(Brazil) Thiago Leitão	Mutual agreement	6 August 2026	10th	(Bolivia) Juan Pablo Grass (Note: Originally as caretaker manager, appointed on a permanent basis on 10 August 2026.)	6 August 2026
Universitario de Vinto	(Bolivia) Wálter Flores	Sacked	7 August 2026	15th	(Argentina) Marcelo Straccia	8 August 2026
Real Tomayapo	(Bolivia) René Hinojosa	Resigned	8 August 2026	16th	(Argentina) Jorge Alfonso	10 August 2026
Aurora	(Colombia) Giancarlo Umaña	Mutual agreement	23 August 2026	7th	(Bolivia) Donadony Alá Soto	25 August 2026
Always Ready	(Bolivia) Mauricio Soria	Sacked	23 August 2026	1st	(Paraguay) Pablo Godoy	24 August 2026
ABB	(Chile) Sebastián Núñez	Sacked	24 August 2026	11th	(Bolivia) Wálter Flores	24 August 2026
GV San José	(Bolivia) Julio César Baldivieso	Resigned	25 August 2026	15th	(Bolivia) Humberto Viviani	27 August 2026
Aurora	(Bolivia) Donadony Alá Soto	End of caretaker spell	28 August 2026	8th	(Uruguay) Enrique Díaz	28 August 2026
Real Potosí	(Colombia) Flabio Torres	Resigned	1 September 2026	7th	(Colombia) Giancarlo Umaña	1 September 2026
GV San José	(Bolivia) Humberto Viviani	Resigned	7 September 2026	16th	(Argentina) Miguel Ángel Zahzú (Note: Artur Costa was the caretaker manager for the 2026 Copa Bolivia 6th round match against Blooming.)	10 September 2026
Universitario de Vinto	(Argentina) Marcelo Straccia	Sacked	11 September 2026	16th	(Bolivia) Adrián Barral	13 September 2026
Real Oruro	(Paraguay) Néstor Colinas	End of caretaker spell	15 September 2026	11th	(Argentina) Nicolás Straccia	15 September 2026
GV San José	(Argentina) Miguel Ángel Zahzú	Resigned	21 September 2026	16th	(Brazil) Artur Costa	22 September 2026
Blooming	(Bolivia) Erwin Sánchez	Sacked	23 September 2026	9th	(Argentina) Cristian Paulucci	23 September 2026
Nacional Potosí	(Bolivia) Eduardo Villegas	Sacked	23 September 2026	8th	(Bolivia) Dayler Gutiérrez	23 September 2026
ABB	(Bolivia) Wálter Flores	Sacked	21 October 2026	14th	(Brazil) Charles Rodrigues	21 October 2026
ABB	(Brazil) Charles Rodrigues	Not registered by the club	29 October 2026	14th	(Bolivia) Jaime Jemio	29 October 2026

== Standings ==
Pos	Team	Pld	W	D	L	GF	GA	GD	Pts	Qualification or relegation
1	Bolívar (T)	26	19	3	4	61	25	+36	60	Qualification for Copa Libertadores group stage
2	Always Ready (T)	25	17	6	2	61	19	+42	57	Qualification for Copa Libertadores group stage
3	The Strongest (X)	26	15	6	5	50	29	+21	51	Qualification for Copa Libertadores first stage
4	Real Potosí (X)	26	11	10	5	33	18	+15	43	Qualification for Copa Sudamericana first stage
5	Oriente Petrolero	26	12	6	8	45	33	+12	42	Qualification for Copa Sudamericana first stage
6	Aurora	26	9	12	5	38	33	+5	39	Qualification for Copa Sudamericana first stage
7	Nacional Potosí	26	10	6	10	42	34	+8	36	
8	Guabirá	25	9	6	10	40	50	−10	33	
9	Real Oruro	25	9	4	12	41	58	−17	31	
10	Independiente Petrolero	26	8	7	11	34	44	−10	31	
11	Blooming	26	7	10	9	33	31	+2	31	
12	San Antonio Bulo Bulo	25	8	3	14	28	50	−22	27	
13	Real Tomayapo	26	6	5	15	20	47	−27	23	
14	Universitario de Vinto	25	6	4	15	32	49	−17	22	
15	ABB	26	6	2	18	39	60	−21	20	Qualification for Promotion/relegation play-off
16	GV San José	25	4	8	13	30	47	−17	20	Relegation to Bolivian Football Regional Leagues

Updated to match(es) played on 22 November 2026 (2 of 3 matches finished). Source: Soccerway
Rules for classification: 1) Points, 2) Wins, 3) Goal difference, 4) Goals for, 5) Away goals for, 6) Red cards, 7) Yellow cards.
(T) Qualified, but not yet for the particular phase indicated; (X) Assured of Copa Sudamericana, but may still qualify for Copa Libertadores

== Results ==
Home \ Away	ABB	CAR	AUR	BLO	BOL	GUA	GVS	IPE	NAC	ORI	TRO	RPO	RTO	SAB	STR	UVI
ABB	—	1–3	1–2	3–2	0–2	0–1	2–2	3–1		3–1	4–1	0–1		2–3	1–2	2–0
Always Ready	3–2	—	2–2		1–0	6–0		2–0	3–1	1–0	5–1	1–1	4–0	3–1	0–1	4–0
Aurora	3–2	1–1	—		2–4	4–2	3–0		2–2	2–2	1–1	0–0	1–0	3–1		1–1
Blooming	6–1	0–0	3–0	—	0–0	5–0	1–1	0–0	2–1	0–1	1–1		1–0		1–1	1–1
Bolívar	4–1			1–0	—	4–0	4–2	1–2	1–1	2–1	5–2	2–1	6–0	4–1	1–0	2–1
Guabirá		1–2	3–1	1–1	1–2	—	3–0	2–2	2–1	1–1	4–1	1–1	3–0	5–1	3–1	
GV San José	1–2	2–3	1–1	2–1	1–2	4–1	—		0–3	3–3	1–3		3–2	0–0	0–0	2–1
Independiente Petrolero	4–2	0–0	1–1	3–1	0–4	3–1	1–0	—	0–3	1–2		1–2	0–2	1–3		2–1
Nacional Potosí	2–0	0–4	2–0	2–1	0–1	3–0	1–1	3–0	—		1–4	1–1	4–1		2–3	1–0
Oriente Petrolero	1–0	1–2	1–1	0–1		2–2	2–1	2–2	1–0	—		2–0	3–1	4–0	2–1	5–0
Real Oruro		0–6	1–0	2–2	2–4		3–1	0–3	1–1	2–3	—	0–2		2–0	2–3	4–1
Real Potosí	3–1		0–0	2–0	1–0	3–0	0–0	1–1	1–1	2–1	1–2	—	0–1	5–0	1–0	
Real Tomayapo	1–1	1–1	0–2	1–2	1–2		1–0	2–1	1–5	0–2	1–2	1–1	—	1–0	0–0	
San Antonio Bulo Bulo	2–1		0–2	2–0		1–2		2–2	2–1	2–0	2–1	2–1	0–0	—	0–3	0–2
The Strongest	3–1	2–1	1–1	4–0	1–1		4–2	1–2		2–1	5–0	0–0	3–1	3–2	—	4–3
Universitario de Vinto	5–2	1–3	1–2	1–1	3–2	1–1		3–1	2–0		1–3	0–2	0–1	2–1	1–2	—

Updated to match(es) played on 22 November 2026 (2 of 3 matches finished). Source: Soccerway
Legend: Blue = home team win; Yellow = draw; Red = away team win.

== Top scorers ==
As of 22 November 2026 (2 of 3 matches finished)

Rank	Player	Club	Goals
1	(Argentina) Enrique Triverio	Always Ready	21
2	(Colombia) Juan Fajardo	ABB	16
3	(Paraguay) Alex Cáceres	GV San José	13
3	(Uruguay) Martín Cauteruccio	Bolívar	13
3	(Brazil) Willie	Independiente Petrolero	13
6	(Guatemala) Darwin Lom	The Strongest	12
7	(Dominican Republic) Dorny Romero	Bolívar	10
8	(Colombia) Adrián Estacio	The Strongest	9
8	(Bolivia) Luis Alí	Real Potosí	9
10	(Bolivia) Adalid Terrazas	San Antonio Bulo Bulo	8
10	(Bolivia) José Flores	Oriente Petrolero	8
10	(Bolivia) Jaime Arrascaita	The Strongest	8
10	(Uruguay) Nahuel Roldán	Oriente Petrolero	8

Source: Soccerway

== See also ==
- 2026 Copa Bolivia
