= 2025 FBF División Profesional =

División Profesional
- Season: 2025
- Dates: 28 March – 15 December 2025
- Champions: Always Ready (4th title)
- Relegated: Jorge Wilstermann
- Copa Libertadores: Always Ready; Bolívar; Nacional Potosí (via Copa Bolivia); The Strongest
- Copa Sudamericana: San Antonio Bulo Bulo; Blooming; Independiente Petrolero; Guabirá
- Matches: 240
- Goals: 870 (3.63 per match)
- Top goalscorer: Óscar Villalba (25 goals)
- Biggest home win: Real Oruro 10–1 Blooming (6 December)
- Biggest away win: U. de Vinto 0–7 Always Ready (27 April); ABB 0–7 Always Ready (28 November)
- Highest scoring: Real Oruro 10–1 Blooming (25 September)

The 2025 FBF División Profesional was the 47th season of the División Profesional del Fútbol Boliviano, Bolivia's top-flight football league and the seventh season under División de Fútbol Profesional management. The season began on 28 March and ended on 15 December 2025. Although the season was originally expected to begin on 14 February 2025, delays in the resolution of disciplinary cases that could affect the club composition for the season eventually forced the start date to be moved to 28 March.

Always Ready were the champions, winning their fourth league title on the penultimate matchday of the season after defeating Guabirá 6–0 on 11 December 2025. Bolívar were the defending champions.

On 28 February 2025, Aurora were deducted 33 points ahead of the season, as punishment for the Gabriel Montaño case. Due to that point deduction, Aurora had been mathematically relegated to the Cochabamba regional league with five matches left in the season after losing to GV San José on 21 November. However, the ruling was overturned by the Court of Arbitration for Sport on 19 December following an appeal lodged by Aurora, which meant that Aurora went up to tenth place with 37 points and Jorge Wilstermann went from second to last place to last, being relegated directly to the regional leagues.

== Format ==
The format for the season was decided at a meeting of the División Profesional's Council on 11 March 2025, following the resolution of disciplinary cases involving the club Royal Pari and Aurora player Gabriel Montaño. The 2025 season would no longer continue the half-year tournaments in a single season. Instead, a double round-robin league competition in which the 16 participating teams played each other twice for a total of 30 rounds. The season would start on 30 March and end in December. The team finishing first after the 30 rounds of the league tournament at the end of the season was the División Profesional champion.

The champions and runners-up of the league tournament qualified for the 2026 Copa Libertadores group stage as Bolivia 1 and Bolivia 2, whilst the Copa Bolivia champions will qualify for the Copa Libertadores as Bolivia 3 and the runners-up of the latter tournament will claim the last berth to the 2026 Copa Sudamericana. The remaining international berths were awarded to the best-placed teams in the league tournament, whilst the team placing last in this tournament was relegated and the team placing second-from-bottom will have to play a relegation play-off against the Copa Simón Bolívar runner-up. No aggregate table was considered for this season.

== Teams ==
Sixteen teams competed in the league for the 2025 season: the top 14 teams in the aggregate table of the 2024 Primera División season, along with ABB who promoted from the 2024 Copa Simón Bolívar and Real Oruro, who took part in the promotion/relegation play-off. ABB achieved a first-ever promotion to the top tier on 1 December 2024, after winning the Copa Simón Bolívar title. Meanwhile, Real Oruro's first-ever promotion was confirmed on 6 January 2025, after the Bolivian Football Federation's Sports Disciplinary Court ruled the exclusion of Royal Pari from the competition following their abandonment of the second leg of the promotion/relegation play-off.

ABB and Real Oruro replaced Real Santa Cruz and Royal Pari, both relegated to the Santa Cruz regional league.

=== Stadia and locations ===
Locations of the 2025 División Profesional teams.

Team	City	Stadium	Capacity
ABB	El Alto	Municipal de Villa Ingenio	22,000
Always Ready	El Alto	Municipal de Villa Ingenio	22,000
Aurora	Cochabamba	Félix Capriles	32,000
Blooming	Santa Cruz de la Sierra	Ramón Tahuichi Aguilera (Note: Blooming and Oriente Petrolero played most of their home matches at Estadio Gilberto Parada in Montero and Estadio Real Santa Cruz in Santa Cruz de la Sierra as Estadio Ramón Tahuichi Aguilera was temporarily closed for remodelling works ahead of the 2025 Copa Sudamericana final.)	38,000
Bolívar	La Paz	Hernando Siles	42,000
Guabirá	Montero	Gilberto Parada	13,000
GV San José	Oruro	Jesús Bermúdez	33,000
Independiente Petrolero	Sucre	Olímpico Patria	30,700
Jorge Wilstermann	Cochabamba	Félix Capriles	32,000
Nacional Potosí	Potosí	Víctor Agustín Ugarte	32,105
Oriente Petrolero	Santa Cruz de la Sierra	Ramón Tahuichi Aguilera	38,000
Real Oruro	Oruro	Jesús Bermúdez	33,000
Real Tomayapo	Tarija	IV Centenario	15,000
San Antonio Bulo Bulo	Entre Ríos	Carlos Villegas	17,000
The Strongest	La Paz	Hernando Siles	42,000
Universitario de Vinto	Cochabamba	Félix Capriles (Note: Used along with Estadio Municipal de Quillacollo as home stadiums for the season since Universitario's stadium Estadio Hipólito Lazarte does not meet FBF requirements for a professional match.)	32,000

=== Personnel and kits ===
Team	Manager	Kit manufacturer	Main shirt sponsors
ABB	(Bolivia) Víctor Hugo Mamani	Drei	UTB
Always Ready	(Bolivia) Julio César Baldivieso	Marathon	UTB
Aurora	(Bolivia) Sergio Zeballos (Bolivia) Edward Zenteno (caretakers)	Marathon	
Blooming	(Bolivia) Mauricio Soria	Marathon	Gree
Bolívar	(Argentina) Flavio Robatto	Puma	Suzuki
Guabirá	(Argentina) Marcelo Straccia	Forte	Celina, Ingenio Guabirá, Grupo Paz
GV San José	(Bolivia) Jorge Wuinch (caretaker)	Arce	4life Grains, Paceña
Independiente Petrolero	(Bolivia) René Hinojosa	Red White	UTB, Fancesa
Jorge Wilstermann	(Bolivia) Humberto Viviani	Puma	Kia
Nacional Potosí	(Bolivia) Leonardo Eguez	Oxígeno Wear	Banco Económico, Ingenio San Silvestre
Oriente Petrolero	(Argentina) Víctor Hugo Andrada	Marathon	Yango, Finesse
Real Oruro	(Argentina) Marcelo Robledo	Arce	UTB
Real Tomayapo	(Spain) Juan Cortés	Oxígeno Wear	Altavida
San Antonio Bulo Bulo	(Colombia) Diómedes Peña (caretaker)	Forte	UTB
The Strongest	(Bolivia) Juan Carlos Paz (caretaker)	Marathon	Kia
Universitario de Vinto	(Bolivia) Adrián Barral (caretaker)	Marathon	UTB

=== Managerial changes ===
Team	Outgoing manager	Manner of departure	Date of vacancy	Position in table	Incoming manager	Date of appointment
The Strongest	(Spain) Ismael Rescalvo	End of contract	20 December 2024	Pre-season	(Brazil) Antônio Carlos Zago	12 January 2025
Always Ready	(Bolivia) Jaime Jemio	Return to assistant role	21 December 2024	Pre-season	(Bolivia) Eduardo Villegas	2 January 2025
Jorge Wilstermann	(Bolivia) Franz Taboada	End of caretaker spell	21 December 2024	Pre-season	(Argentina) Luciano Theiler	4 January 2025
Nacional Potosí	(Bolivia) Dayler Gutiérrez	End of caretaker spell	21 December 2024	Pre-season	(Argentina) César Vigevani	27 December 2024
Aurora	(Uruguay) Sergio Órteman	End of contract	24 December 2024	Pre-season	(Paraguay) Daniel Farrar (Note: Aurora originally appointed Rodrigo Venegas as manager on 26 December 2024, but on 4 January 2025 the club informed him that he would not take over the team.)	8 January 2025
San Antonio Bulo Bulo	(Bolivia) Leonardo Eguez	End of contract	24 December 2024	Pre-season	(Bolivia) Julio César Baldivieso	27 December 2024
Blooming	(Bolivia) Álvaro Peña	End of contract	25 December 2024	Pre-season	(Bolivia) Mauricio Soria	25 December 2024
Guabirá	(Bolivia) Víctor Hugo Andrada	Sacked	26 December 2024	Pre-season	(Argentina) Rolando Carlen	26 December 2024
GV San José	(Bolivia) Julio César Baldivieso	Signed by San Antonio Bulo Bulo	27 December 2024	Pre-season	(Argentina) Dalcio Giovagnoli	16 January 2025
Universitario de Vinto	(Paraguay) Pablo Godoy	End of contract	31 December 2024	Pre-season	(Brazil) Thiago Leitão	6 January 2025
ABB	(Bolivia) David Condori	End of contract	31 December 2024	Pre-season	(Bolivia) Julio Quinteros	20 January 2025
Real Oruro	(Argentina) Daniel Gómez	Sacked	7 January 2025	Pre-season	(Bolivia) Alberto Illanes	10 January 2025
ABB	(Bolivia) Julio Quinteros	Sacked	14 February 2025	Pre-season	(Paraguay) Pablo Godoy	14 February 2025
Oriente Petrolero	(Bolivia) Joaquín Monasterio	Sacked	4 March 2025	Pre-season	(Chile) Rodrigo Venegas	4 March 2025
Always Ready	(Bolivia) Eduardo Villegas	Sacked	19 March 2025	Pre-season	(Bolivia) Julio César Baldivieso	24 March 2025
San Antonio Bulo Bulo	(Bolivia) Julio César Baldivieso	Resigned	20 March 2025	Pre-season	(Bolivia) Joaquín Monasterio	22 March 2025
The Strongest	(Brazil) Antônio Carlos Zago	Signed by Botafogo-PB	7 April 2025	8th	(Bolivia) Juan Carlos Paz (Note: Caretaker manager.)	10 April 2025 (Note: The Strongest originally appointed Pablo Cabanillas as caretaker manager on 9 April, but he was replaced the following day following an agreement between the two claimants to the club's chairmanship and the FBF.)
Oriente Petrolero	(Chile) Rodrigo Venegas	Sacked	13 April 2025	14th	(Bolivia) Gualberto Mojica (Note: Originally as caretaker manager, appointed on a permanent basis on 22 April 2025.)	14 April 2025
Jorge Wilstermann	(Argentina) Luciano Theiler	Resigned	14 April 2025	15th	(Argentina) Cristian Chávez (Note: Originally as caretaker manager, appointed on a permanent basis on 29 April 2025.)	15 April 2025
The Strongest	(Bolivia) Juan Carlos Paz	End of caretaker spell	18 April 2025	1st	(Argentina) Carlos Bustos	17 April 2025
GV San José	(Argentina) Dalcio Giovagnoli	Sacked	23 April 2025	6th	(Bolivia) Eduardo Villegas	24 April 2025
Aurora	(Paraguay) Daniel Farrar	Mutual agreement	18 May 2025	16th	(Bolivia) David Quiruchi (Note: Originally as caretaker manager, subsequently appointed on a permanent basis.)	23 May 2025
Guabirá	(Argentina) Rolando Carlen	Sacked	26 May 2025	7th	(Bolivia) Alberto Illanes	31 May 2025
Nacional Potosí	(Argentina) César Vigevani	Sacked	28 May 2025	12th	(Bolivia) Dayler Gutiérrez	29 May 2025
Real Oruro	(Bolivia) Alberto Illanes	Mutual agreement	30 May 2025	14th	(Argentina) Marcelo Straccia	4 June 2025
San Antonio Bulo Bulo	(Bolivia) Joaquín Monasterio	Sacked	8 June 2025	12th	(Venezuela) Pedro Depablos	11 June 2025
Real Tomayapo	(Bolivia) Humberto Viviani	Sacked	6 July 2025	8th	(Argentina) Daniel Sagman (Note: Christian Bernadas was the caretaker manager for the 14th round match against The Strongest.)	11 July 2025
Independiente Petrolero	(Argentina) Marcelo Robledo	Resigned	8 July 2025	14th	(Bolivia) Leonardo Eguez	9 July 2025
The Strongest	(Argentina) Carlos Bustos	Mutual agreement	10 July 2025	2nd	(Bolivia) Joaquín Monasterio	10 July 2025
ABB	(Paraguay) Pablo Godoy	Resigned	17 July 2025	9th	(Brazil) João Paulo Barros	18 July 2025
Nacional Potosí	(Bolivia) Dayler Gutiérrez	Sacked	24 July 2025	11th	(Paraguay) Pablo Godoy	25 July 2025
Real Oruro	(Argentina) Marcelo Straccia	Resigned	30 July 2025	13th	(Paraguay) Néstor Colinas	30 July 2025
Guabirá	(Bolivia) Alberto Illanes	Mutual agreement	31 July 2025	10th	(Argentina) Marcelo Straccia	31 July 2025
Real Oruro	(Paraguay) Néstor Colinas	End of caretaker spell	4 August 2025	11th	(Argentina) Marcelo Robledo	4 August 2025
Jorge Wilstermann	(Argentina) Cristian Chávez	Return to player role	5 August 2025	15th	(Bolivia) Humberto Viviani	5 August 2025
Oriente Petrolero	(Bolivia) Gualberto Mojica	Sacked	11 August 2025	10th	(Bolivia) Álvaro Peña	15 August 2025
ABB	(Brazil) João Paulo Barros	Sacked	25 August 2025	14th	(Argentina) Facundo Biondi	26 August 2025
Nacional Potosí	(Paraguay) Pablo Godoy	Sacked	9 September 2025	9th	(Bolivia) Leonardo Eguez	10 September 2025
Independiente Petrolero	(Bolivia) Leonardo Eguez	Resigned	9 September 2025	8th	(Bolivia) René Hinojosa	10 September 2025
GV San José	(Bolivia) Eduardo Villegas	Mutual agreement	22 September 2025	8th	(Bolivia) Wálter Flores	22 September 2025
Universitario de Vinto	(Brazil) Thiago Leitão	Resigned	30 September 2025	11th	(Bolivia) Adrián Barral	30 September 2025
Aurora	(Bolivia) David Quiruchi	Sacked	2 October 2025	16th	(Bolivia) Sergio Zeballos (Bolivia) Edward Zenteno (Note: Caretaker managers.)	3 October 2025
Real Tomayapo	(Argentina) Daniel Sagman	Sacked	2 October 2025	13th	(Spain) Juan Cortés	2 October 2025
ABB	(Argentina) Facundo Biondi	Sacked	6 October 2025	14th	(Paraguay) Pablo Godoy	6 October 2025
San Antonio Bulo Bulo	(Venezuela) Pedro Depablos	Resigned	10 November 2025	7th	(Colombia) Diómedes Peña	10 November 2025
Oriente Petrolero	(Bolivia) Álvaro Peña	Sacked	17 November 2025	10th	(Argentina) Víctor Hugo Andrada	18 November 2025
GV San José	(Bolivia) Wálter Flores	Resigned	2 December 2025	9th	(Bolivia) Jorge Wuinch (Note: Caretaker manager until the end of the season.)	3 December 2025
The Strongest	(Bolivia) Joaquín Monasterio	Resigned	11 December 2025	3rd	(Bolivia) Juan Carlos Paz	12 December 2025
ABB	(Paraguay) Pablo Godoy	Resigned	20 December 2025	15th	(Bolivia) Víctor Hugo Mamani	20 December 2025

== Standings ==
Pos	Team	Pld	W	D	L	GF	GA	GD	Pts	Qualification or relegation
1	Always Ready (C)	30	22	5	3	91	34	+57	71	Qualification for Copa Libertadores group stage
2	Bolívar	30	21	5	4	82	32	+50	68	Qualification for Copa Libertadores group stage
3	The Strongest	30	21	1	8	77	48	+29	64	Qualification for Copa Libertadores first stage
4	San Antonio Bulo Bulo	30	13	7	10	62	54	+8	46	Qualification for Copa Sudamericana first stage
5	Blooming	30	14	4	12	53	56	−3	46	Qualification for Copa Sudamericana first stage
6	Independiente Petrolero	30	13	6	11	56	57	−1	45	Qualification for Copa Sudamericana first stage
7	Nacional Potosí	30	12	7	11	51	41	+10	43	Qualification for Copa Libertadores second stage (Note: Nacional Potosí qualified for the Copa Libertadores second stage by winning the 2025 Copa Bolivia.)
8	Guabirá	30	13	4	13	59	63	−4	43	Qualification for Copa Sudamericana first stage
9	GV San José	30	12	5	13	46	50	−4	41	
10	Aurora	30	11	4	15	53	63	−10	37	
11	Real Tomayapo	30	9	8	13	40	53	−13	35	
12	Oriente Petrolero	30	9	6	15	45	58	−13	33	
13	Real Oruro	30	8	7	15	60	66	−6	31	
14	Universitario de Vinto	30	6	8	16	32	60	−28	26	
15	ABB (O)	30	6	8	16	33	64	−31	26	Qualification for Promotion/relegation play-off
16	Jorge Wilstermann (R)	30	4	7	19	30	71	−41	19	Relegation to Bolivian Football Regional Leagues

Source: Soccerway
Rules for classification: 1) Points, 2) Playoff game (only if needed to decide championship between two teams), 3) Goal difference, 4) Goals for, 5) Away goals for, 6) Yellow cards, 7) Drawing of lots.
(C) Champions; (O) Play-off winners; (R) Relegated

== Results ==
Home \ Away	ABB	CAR	AUR	BLO	BOL	GUA	GVS	IPE	WIL	NAC	ORI	TRO	RTO	SAB	STR	UVI
ABB	—	0–7	2–1	1–1	0–3	1–1	0–0	1–2	0–0	2–2	5–2	1–2	0–0	2–0	1–2	2–0
Always Ready	5–1	—	5–3	2–1	1–1	6–0	2–0	5–0	2–0	1–0	2–0	4–0	1–1	5–2	7–2	5–1
Aurora	3–2	1–1	—	4–1	0–2	0–2	3–1	2–3	1–0	1–2	5–1	2–2	1–2	2–0	2–1	2–0
Blooming	6–0	1–0	2–1	—	1–2	2–1	5–1	3–1	3–1	0–0	2–1	4–2	2–0	0–3	3–1	1–0
Bolívar	3–2	2–2	6–1	5–1	—	4–0	1–3	4–0	5–1	5–2	1–0	3–1	5–0	5–0	1–2	3–0
Guabirá	5–1	5–0	5–2	1–0	2–4	—	2–1	1–1	6–3	1–0	1–3	3–1	1–0	1–2	2–1	3–0
GV San José	1–1	0–1	4–1	1–4	0–2	4–1	—	2–1	2–1	1–0	5–1	0–0	3–1	1–5	0–4	5–0
Independiente Petrolero	2–0	5–2	2–4	3–0	1–2	3–1	0–2	—	2–1	1–1	5–2	0–0	2–1	4–2	1–1	1–1
Jorge Wilstermann	0–1	2–7	1–1	1–0	2–2	1–1	2–2	0–1	—	2–5	3–1	3–1	0–0	0–3	1–2	0–2
Nacional Potosí	2–0	0–1	3–1	3–0	1–1	3–0	1–2	2–1	1–2	—	4–1	2–3	1–0	2–3	0–2	5–1
Oriente Petrolero	3–3	1–2	3–0	3–1	1–3	4–0	0–2	2–1	2–0	2–2	—	3–0	2–1	1–1	3–2	0–0
Real Oruro	0–1	1–1	5–3	10–1	3–1	3–6	1–1	3–4	3–1	1–2	1–1	—	5–2	0–2	1–2	2–0
Real Tomayapo	2–1	1–2	0–0	2–2	2–1	3–2	2–1	3–3	6–1	0–1	1–0	3–2	—	1–1	1–0	1–1
San Antonio Bulo Bulo	4–0	0–1	1–2	2–2	0–1	1–1	2–0	4–2	2–0	2–2	1–1	5–3	5–4	—	3–4	2–0
The Strongest	3–2	2–3	3–2	3–2	2–3	5–1	2–1	3–1	6–0	2–0	2–0	2–1	6–0	6–3	—	3–2
Universitario de Vinto	2–0	0–7	1–2	1–2	1–1	4–2	4–0	2–3	1–1	2–2	2–1	2–2	1–0	1–1	0–1	—

Source: Soccerway
Legend: Blue = home team win; Yellow = draw; Red = away team win.

== Top scorers ==
Rank	Player	Club	Goals
1	(Argentina) Óscar Villalba	Independiente Petrolero	25
2	(Paraguay) Héctor Bobadilla	Jorge Wilstermann / Always Ready	20
3	(Bolivia) Gustavo Peredo	Guabirá	16
4	(Dominican Republic) Dorny Romero	Bolívar	15
5	(Bolivia) Moisés Paniagua	Always Ready	13
6	(Colombia) Anthony Vásquez	San Antonio Bulo Bulo	12
6	(Argentina) Sebastián Zeballos	Real Oruro	12
8	(Colombia) Jasond González	Always Ready	11
8	(Paraguay) Juan Godoy	The Strongest	11
8	(Argentina) Enrique Triverio	The Strongest / Always Ready	11
8	(Bolivia) John García	The Strongest	11

Source: Besoccer

== Promotion/relegation play-off ==
The promotion/relegation play-off was a two-legged series played by the team placing 15th in the 2025 División Profesional (originally Jorge Wilstermann) and the 2025 Copa Simón Bolívar runners-up San Juan.

The play-off matches were set to be played on 20 and 23 December 2025 (originally scheduled for 17 and 20 December), but the series between Jorge Wilstermann and San Juan was annulled due to Aurora's successful appeal at the Court of Arbitration for Sport, which implied that Jorge Wilstermann would end the season in last place and would be directly relegated and ABB was confirmed as San Juan's rival instead.

ABB defeated San Juan in the series and remained in the top flight for the 2026 season.

21 December 2025
16:00 UTC−4

San Juan	3–1	ABB
Rodríguez 25'; Balcázar 58'; Pontons 90+10'	Report	Bejarano 64'

Estadio Gilberto Parada, Montero
Referee: Dilio Rodríguez

23 December 2025
15:00 UTC−4

ABB	2–0	San Juan
Loza 45+7' (pen.); Cervantes 57'	Report
Penalties
Bejarano (penalty scored); Vedia (penalty scored); Cervantes (penalty scored); Abastoflor (penalty scored); Loza (penalty scored)	5–3	(penalty scored) Brítez; (penalty scored) Hurtado; (penalty scored) El-Hage; (penalty missed) Suárez

Estadio Municipal, El Alto
Referee: Jordy Alemán

Tied 3–3 on aggregate, ABB won on penalties.

== See also ==
- 2025 Copa Bolivia
