= 2026 Copa Bolivia =

Tournament details
- Country: Bolivia
- Dates: 18 August – 25 November 2026
- Teams: 16

Tournament statistics
- Matches played: 77
- Goals scored: 267 (3.47 per match)
- Top goal scorer: Jeferson Rivas (11 goals)
- All statistics correct as of 18 November 2026.

The 2026 Copa Bolivia, known as the 2026 Copa Paceña for sponsorship purposes, is the third edition of the Copa Bolivia, Bolivia's football league cup competition, which is contested by the 16 teams that take part in the FBF División Profesional in its 2026 season. The competition began on 18 August and is scheduled to end on 25 November 2026.

Nacional Potosí were the defending champions, but they were knocked out by crosstown rivals Real Potosí in the semi-finals.

== Format ==
The competition features four stages: a group stage, quarter-finals, semi-finals, and finals. In the group stage, the 16 participating teams were drawn into four groups and played eight matches, two against each one of their group rivals, as well as two against their derby rival (which was drawn into a different group).

The four group winners and runners-up will advance to the knockout rounds, all of which will be played over two legs. In the quarter-finals, the teams qualifying from Group A played the ones coming from Group D whilst the teams advancing from Group B faced the ones from Group C. The winning sides advanced to the semi-finals, and the two semi-final winners will eventually play the final, with the champions being awarded the Bolivia 3 berth into the 2027 Copa Libertadores and the runners-up qualifying for the 2027 Copa Sudamericana as Bolivia 1.

Unlike the previous edition of the competition, no interzonal matches other than the derbies nor additional play-off rounds were played.

== Draw ==
The draw for the competition was held on 22 July 2026 in Santa Cruz de la Sierra. The 16 teams were drawn into four groups of four teams, with regional rivals being allocated to different groups.

The draw resulted in the following groups:

Group A
Pos	Team
A1	San Antonio Bulo Bulo
A2	ABB
A3	Aurora
A4	Real Potosí

Group B
Pos	Team
B1	Always Ready
B2	Real Oruro
B3	Real Tomayapo
B4	Nacional Potosí

Group C
Pos	Team
C1	Guabirá
C2	Oriente Petrolero
C3	The Strongest
C4	Universitario de Vinto

Group D
Pos	Team
D1	Bolívar
D2	GV San José
D3	Blooming
D4	Independiente Petrolero

== Group stage ==
The group stage was played from 18 August to 7 October 2026. Teams played each of their group rivals as well as their derby rival twice. The top two teams in each group advanced to the knockout stage of the competition.

=== Group A ===
Pos	Team	Pld	W	D	L	GF	GA	GD	Pts	Qualification	AUR	RPO	SAB	ABB
1	Aurora	8	5	3	0	13	6	+7	18	Advance to Quarter-finals	—	1–0	2–2	2–0
2	Real Potosí	8	4	2	2	14	12	+2	14	Advance to Quarter-finals	1–1	—	4–2	3–1
3	San Antonio Bulo Bulo	8	3	1	4	15	12	+3	10		0–1	3–0	—	0–2
4	ABB	8	2	0	6	9	13	−4	6		0–1	2–3	0–2	—

Source: Soccerway
Legend: Blue = home team win; Yellow = draw; Red = away team win.
Rules for classification: 1) Points, 2) Wins, 3) Goal difference, 4) Goals for, 5) Away goals for, 6) Red cards, 7) Yellow cards.

=== Group B ===
Pos	Team	Pld	W	D	L	GF	GA	GD	Pts	Qualification	NAC	CAR	RTO	TRO
1	Nacional Potosí	8	5	2	1	24	7	+17	17	Advance to Quarter-finals	—	9–0	5–1	2–0
2	Always Ready	8	3	1	4	14	22	−8	10	Advance to Quarter-finals	2–3	—	4–0	4–2
3	Real Tomayapo	8	3	1	4	10	20	−10	10		1–1	2–0	—	2–1
4	Real Oruro	8	2	1	5	11	16	−5	7		0–2	2–2	4–0	—

Source: Soccerway
Legend: Blue = home team win; Yellow = draw; Red = away team win.
Rules for classification: 1) Points, 2) Wins, 3) Goal difference, 4) Goals for, 5) Away goals for, 6) Red cards, 7) Yellow cards.

=== Group C ===
Pos	Team	Pld	W	D	L	GF	GA	GD	Pts	Qualification	STR	ORI	GUA	UVI
1	The Strongest	8	4	2	2	16	13	+3	14	Advance to Quarter-finals	—	2–1	2–1	5–2
2	Oriente Petrolero	8	4	1	3	12	9	+3	13	Advance to Quarter-finals	1–1	—	1–0	2–0
3	Guabirá	8	4	0	4	11	15	−4	12		2–1	2–1	—	2–1
4	Universitario de Vinto	8	2	1	5	13	17	−4	7		1–2	3–0	3–1	—

Source: Soccerway
Legend: Blue = home team win; Yellow = draw; Red = away team win.
Rules for classification: 1) Points, 2) Wins, 3) Goal difference, 4) Goals for, 5) Away goals for, 6) Red cards, 7) Yellow cards.

=== Group D ===
Pos	Team	Pld	W	D	L	GF	GA	GD	Pts	Qualification	BOL	IPE	GVS	BLO
1	Bolívar	8	5	3	0	17	7	+10	18	Advance to Quarter-finals	—	1–1	3–2	3–0
2	Independiente Petrolero	8	5	1	2	16	11	+5	16	Advance to Quarter-finals	0–3	—	1–0	5–2
3	GV San José	8	2	0	6	11	17	−6	6		0–1	1–3	—	3–2
4	Blooming	8	1	1	6	11	20	−9	4		1–1	0–1	5–1	—

Source: Soccerway
Legend: Blue = home team win; Yellow = draw; Red = away team win.
Rules for classification: 1) Points, 2) Wins, 3) Goal difference, 4) Goals for, 5) Away goals for, 6) Red cards, 7) Yellow cards.

=== Interzonal matches ===
The interzonal matches were played on the second and fourth matchdays.

Round 2
Home	Score	Away
GV San José	4–1	Real Oruro
ABB	0–1	Always Ready
Bolívar	4–2	The Strongest
Blooming	0–3	Oriente Petrolero
San Antonio Bulo Bulo	5–1	Guabirá
Real Tomayapo	3–0	Independiente Petrolero
Universitario de Vinto	1–1	Aurora
Nacional Potosí	0–1	Real Potosí

Round 4
Home	Score	Away
Always Ready	1–4	ABB
Aurora	4–2	Universitario de Vinto
Real Potosí	2–2	Nacional Potosí
Real Oruro	1–0	GV San José
The Strongest	1–1	Bolívar
Oriente Petrolero	3–1	Blooming
Guabirá	2–1	San Antonio Bulo Bulo
Independiente Petrolero	5–1	Real Tomayapo

== Knockout stage ==
=== Bracket ===
Quarter-finals
Independiente Petrolero	4	2	6
Aurora	0	3	3
Always Ready	1	4	5
The Strongest	1	1	2
Real Potosí	3	0	3
Bolívar	1	1	2
Oriente Petrolero	3	1	4
Nacional Potosí	2	5	7

Semi-finals
Independiente Petrolero	0	0	0
Always Ready	0	2	2
Real Potosí	5	2	7
Nacional Potosí	5	0	5

Finals
Always Ready	3
Real Potosí	1

=== Quarter-finals ===
The first legs were played from 20 to 22 October, while the second leg matches are scheduled from 3 to 5 November 2026.

Team 1	Agg.	Team 2	1st leg	2nd leg
Independiente Petrolero	6–3	Aurora	4–0	2–3
Oriente Petrolero	4–7	Nacional Potosí	3–2	1–5
Always Ready	5–2	The Strongest	1–1	4–1
Real Potosí	3–2	Bolívar	3–1	0–1

==== First leg ====
20 October 2026	Independiente Petrolero	4–0	Aurora	Sucre
19:00 UTC−4	Crescencio 34'; Mercado 61'; Roni Santos 63'; Willie 90+5' (pen.)	Report		Stadium: Olímpico Patria; Referee: Cristian Condori

21 October 2026	Real Potosí	3–1	Bolívar	Potosí
18:30 UTC−4	Igor Soares 7'; Rivas 22'; Alí 79'	Report	Echeverría 25'	Stadium: Víctor Agustín Ugarte; Referee: Gery Vargas

21 October 2026	Oriente Petrolero	3–2	Nacional Potosí	Santa Cruz de la Sierra
20:30 UTC−4	Herrera 24'; Escobar 38'; Flores 56'	Report	Hoyos 70', 73'	Stadium: Ramón Tahuichi Aguilera; Referee: Renán Castillo

22 October 2026	Always Ready	1–1	The Strongest	El Alto
20:00 UTC−4	Uzeda 42'	Report	Cueto 53'	Stadium: Municipal de Villa Ingenio; Referee: Dilio Rodríguez

==== Second leg ====
3 November 2026	Aurora	3–2 (3–6 agg.)	Independiente Petrolero	Cochabamba
19:00 UTC−4	Viviani 6', 20'; Terrazas 58'	Report	Mercado 16'; Rojas 29'	Stadium: Félix Capriles; Referee: Bladimir Rueda

4 November 2026	Nacional Potosí	5–1 (7–4 agg.)	Oriente Petrolero	Potosí
18:00 UTC−4	Tobar 22', 60', 77'; Álvarez 48'; Villalba 89'	Report	Roldán 24'	Stadium: Víctor Agustín Ugarte; Referee: Jordy Alemán

4 November 2026	The Strongest	1–4 (2–5 agg.)	Always Ready	La Paz
20:30 UTC−4	Quaglio 20'	Report	Algarañaz 5'; Rambal 28'; Maraude 71'; Torrico 74'	Stadium: Hernando Siles; Referee: Javier Revollo

5 November 2026	Bolívar	1–0 (2–3 agg.)	Real Potosí	La Paz
19:00 UTC−4	Asprilla 30'	Report		Stadium: Hernando Siles; Referee: Cristian Condori

=== Semi-finals ===
The first legs were held on 11 and 12 November, while the second leg matches were played on 15 November 2026.

Team 1	Agg.	Team 2	1st leg	2nd leg
Independiente Petrolero	0–2	Always Ready	0–0	0–2
Real Potosí	7–5	Nacional Potosí	5–5	2–0

==== First leg ====
11 November 2026	Independiente Petrolero	0–0	Always Ready	Sucre
19:00 UTC−4		Report		Stadium: Olímpico Patria; Referee: Jordy Alemán

12 November 2026	Real Potosí	5–5	Nacional Potosí	Potosí
19:00 UTC−4	Rivas 7', 30', 82'; Alí 89' (pen.); Gómez 90+5'	Report	Tobar 1', 20', 36'; Torrico 12'; Tomianovic 62'	Stadium: Víctor Agustín Ugarte; Referee: Gery Vargas

==== Second leg ====
15 November 2026	Always Ready	2–0 (2–0 agg.)	Independiente Petrolero	El Alto
15:00 UTC−4	Maraude 5'; Lima 90+1'	Report		Stadium: Municipal de Villa Ingenio; Referee: Bladimir Rueda

15 November 2026	Nacional Potosí	0–2 (5–7 agg.)	Real Potosí	Potosí
17:30 UTC−4		Report	Rivas 29' (pen.); Igor Soares 75' (pen.)	Stadium: Víctor Agustín Ugarte; Referee: Bruno Vera

=== Finals ===
The finals will be played on 18 and 25 November 2026.

18 November 2026
19:30 UTC−4

Always Ready	3–1	Real Potosí
Quiroga 12'; Restrepo 45+2'; Torrico 80'	Report	Rivas 24'

Estadio Municipal de Villa Ingenio, El Alto
Referee: Dilio Rodríguez

25 November 2026
19:00 UTC−4

Real Potosí	v	Always Ready

Estadio Víctor Agustín Ugarte, Potosí

== Top scorers ==
As of 18 November 2026

Rank	Player	Club	Goals
1	(Colombia) Jeferson Rivas	Real Potosí	12
2	(Colombia) Tommy Tobar	Nacional Potosí	8
3	(Bolivia) Carmelo Algarañaz	Always Ready	7
3	(Argentina) Óscar Villalba	Nacional Potosí	7
5	(Paraguay) Alex Cáceres	GV San José	6
6	(Bolivia) William Álvarez	Nacional Potosí	5
6	(Bolivia) Luis Alí	Real Potosí	5
8	(Bolivia) Mirko Tomianovic	Nacional Potosí	4
8	(Brazil) Willie	Independiente Petrolero	4
8	(Bolivia) Jesús Maraude	Always Ready	4
8	(Bolivia) Alan Mercado	Independiente Petrolero	4
8	(Bolivia) Bruno Miranda	Bolívar	4
8	(Colombia) Carlos Preciado	San Antonio Bulo Bulo	4
8	(Colombia) Bayron Garcés	Blooming	4
8	(Bolivia) Juan Godoy	Always Ready	4

Source: Soccerway

== See also ==
- 2026 FBF División Profesional
