= 2000 Copa Bolivia =

Tournament details
- Country: Bolivia

Final positions
- Champions: The Strongest (3rd title)
- Runners-up: Guabirá

This is the fifth edition of Copa Bolivia. Defending champions were Oriente Petrolero for the second time.

== Qualifying round ==
| Team 1 | Agg. | Team 2 | 1st leg | 2nd leg |
|---|---|---|---|---|
| 31 de Octubre | 2–3 | Aurora | 1–2 | 1–1 |
| Club America (Bolivia) | 2–4 | Club Real Camba | 1–3 | 1–1 |
| Bolivar Nimbles | 1–4 | Club Stormers San Lorenzo | 1–2 | 0–2 |
| Real Cochabamba | 0–1 | Deportivo Cristal | 0–0 | 0–1 |
| Universitario de Pando | 3–1 | Club Callejas | 2–0 | 1–1 |
| Iberoamericana' | 2–1 | White Star F.C. | 1–1 | 1–0 |
| Atlético Ciclón | 1–0 | Real Cochabamba | 0–0 | 1–0 |
| Universitario de Pando | 1–0 | Universitario | 0–0 | 1–0 |

== Play-off round ==
| Team 1 | Agg. | Team 2 | 1st leg | 2nd leg |
|---|---|---|---|---|
| Oriente Petrolero | 2–3 | The Strongest | 2–0 | 0–3 |
| Blooming | 3–0 | Aurora | 3–0 | 0–0 |
| Bolivar | 4–1 | Club Real Camba | 3–0 | 1–1 |
| Jorge Wilstermann | 5–0 | Club Stormers San Lorenzo | 3–0 | 2–0 |
| Guabirá | 4–2 | Real Potosi | 2–2 | 2–0 |
| Independiente Petrolero | 2–3 | Deportivo Cristal | 2–1 | 0–2 |
| Universitario de Pando | 4–4(a) | Iberoamericana | 4–2 | 0–2 |
| Atlético Ciclón | 2–1 | Mariscal Braun | 1–0 | 1–1 |
| Real Santa Cruz | 5–2 | Atletico Pompeya | 3–1 | 2–1 |
| Union Central | (a)1–1 | Universitario de Pando | 0–0 | 1–1 |

== Group stage ==
Group A

Standings

| Pos | Team | Pld | W | D | L | GF | GA | GD | Pts |
|---|---|---|---|---|---|---|---|---|---|
| 1 | The Strongest (A) | 8 | 5 | 2 | 1 | 18 | 10 | +8 | 17 |
| 2 | Blooming (A) | 8 | 5 | 1 | 2 | 12 | 10 | +2 | 16 |
| 3 | Bolívar | 8 | 2 | 3 | 3 | 13 | 13 | 0 | 9 |
| 4 | Deportivo Cristal | 8 | 2 | 2 | 4 | 8 | 12 | −4 | 8 |
| 5 | Unión Central | 8 | 1 | 2 | 5 | 9 | 15 | −6 | 5 |

Updated to match(es) played on September 17, 2009. Source: La Liga
Rules for classification: 1) points; 2) goal difference; 3) number of goals scored.
(A) Advance to a further round

Results

| Home \ Away | STR | BLO | DEC | UCE | BOL |
|---|---|---|---|---|---|
| The Strongest | | 2–0 | 4–1 | 2–1 | 3–3 |
| Blooming | 1–1 | | 2–0 | 3–2 | 2–1 |
| Deportivo Cristal | 1–2 | 2–3 | | 2–0 | 1–0 |
| Unión Central | 1–3 | 0–1 | 0–0 | | 2–1 |
| Bolívar | 2–1 | 2–0 | 1–1 | 3–3 | |

Updated to match(es) played on January 25, 2010. Source: La Liga
Legend: Blue = home team win; Yellow = draw; Red = away team win.

Group B

Standings

| Pos | Team | Pld | W | D | L | GF | GA | GD | Pts |
|---|---|---|---|---|---|---|---|---|---|
| 1 | Guabirá (A) | 8 | 3 | 4 | 1 | 15 | 11 | +4 | 13 |
| 2 | Jorge Wilstermann (A) | 8 | 3 | 3 | 2 | 19 | 16 | +3 | 12 |
| 3 | Atlético Ciclón | 8 | 3 | 3 | 2 | 17 | 17 | 0 | 12 |
| 4 | Iberoamericana | 8 | 2 | 3 | 3 | 14 | 16 | −2 | 9 |
| 5 | Real Santa Cruz | 8 | 1 | 3 | 4 | 18 | 23 | −5 | 6 |

Updated to match(es) played on September 17, 2009. Source: La Liga
Rules for classification: 1) points; 2) goal difference; 3) number of goals scored.
(A) Advance to a further round

Results

| Home \ Away | GUA | WIL | IBE | ACI | RSC |
|---|---|---|---|---|---|
| Guabirá | | 2–2 | 3–0 | 2–2 | 2–2 |
| Jorge Wilstermann | 2–3 | | 1–1 | 5–1 | 4–3 |
| Iberoamericana | 1–1 | 2–2 | | 3–2 | 5–3 |
| Atlético Ciclón | 1–0 | 3–0 | 2–1 | | 4–4 |
| Real Santa Cruz | 1–2 | 1–3 | 2–1 | 2–2 | |

Updated to match(es) played on January 25, 2010. Source: La Liga
Legend: Blue = home team win; Yellow = draw; Red = away team win.

== Semi-final ==
| Team 1 | Agg. | Team 2 | 1st leg | 2nd leg |
|---|---|---|---|---|
| Guabirá | (a)2–2 | Blooming | 1–0 | 1–2 |
| Jorge Wilstermann | 2–3 | The Strongest | 2–1 | 0–2 |

September 20
18:30

| Guabirá | 1 – 0 | Blooming |
|---|---|---|
| Sergio Rogelio Castillo 13' |

Estadio Gilberto Parada, Montero
Attendance: 13,000

September 20
19:30

| Jorge Wilstermann | 2 – 1 | The Strongest |
|---|---|---|
| Edgar Rolando Olivares 45'; Sacha Lima 65' | | Doyle Vaca 21' |

Estadio Felix Capriles, Cochabamba
Attendance: 21,000

September 20
18:30

| Blooming | 2 – 1 | Guabirá |
|---|---|---|
| Diego Cabrera 3'; César Couceiro 38' | | Líder Paz 43' |

Estadio Tahuichi Aguilera, Santa Cruz de la Sierra
Attendance: 23,000

September 20
18:30

| The Strongest | 2 – 0 | Jorge Wilstermann |
|---|---|---|
| Marcelo Torrico 21' Óscar Carmelo Sánchez 67' |

Estadio Hernando Siles, La Paz
Attendance: 21,000

== Final ==
| Team 1 | Agg. | Team 2 | 1st leg | 2nd leg |
|---|---|---|---|---|
| Guabirá | 1–3 | The Strongest | 1–3 | 0–0 |

September 20
18:30

| Guabirá | 2 – 3 | The Strongest |
|---|---|---|
| Sergio Rogelio Castillo 13'; Líder Paz 5' | | Daniel Delfino 34', 58'; Percy Colque 86' |

Estadio Gilberto Parada, Montero
Attendance: 16,000

September 20
18:30

| The Strongest | 0 – 0 | Guabirá |

Estadio Hernando Siles, La Paz
Attendance: 25,000
