= Baldivieso =

Baldivieso is a surname. Notable people with the surname include:

- Enrique Baldivieso, Bolivian politician
- Julio César Baldivieso, Bolivian footballer
- Mauricio Baldivieso, Bolivian footballer

== See also ==
- Enrique Baldivieso Province, province in the Bolivian department of Potosí
