= Hugo Salvatierra =

Bolivian footballer (born 2003)

Personal information
- Full name: Hugo Denar Salvatierra Saucedo
- Date of birth: 15 January 2003 (age 23)
- Place of birth: Portachuelo, Bolivia
- Position: Midfielder

Team information
- Current team: Real Oruro
- Number: 15

Youth career
- Guabirá

Senior career*
Years	Team	Apps	(Gls)
2019–2023	Guabirá	25	(0)
2025–	Real Oruro	4	(0)
- * Club domestic league appearances and goals as of 20:14, 13 December 2025 (UTC)

Hugo Denar Salvatierra Saucedo (born 15 January 2003) is a Bolivian professional footballer who plays as a midfielder for Real Oruro.

== Career ==
=== Club career ===
Salvatierra is a product of Guabirá. He got his professional debut for the club on 15 December 2019 at the age of 16 against Club Destroyers.
