= Jesús Maraude =

Bolivian association football player (born 2008)

Personal information
- Date of birth: 12 February 2008 (age 18)
- Place of birth: Tarija, Bolivia
- Position: Attacking midfielder

Team information
- Current team: Club Always Ready

Youth career
- –2024: Club Bolivar

Senior career*
| Years | Team | Apps | (Gls) |
| 2025– | Club Always Ready | 37 | (5) |

International career^{‡}
| 2024 | Bolivia U15 | 4 | (1) |
| 2025 | Bolivia U17 | 11 | (3) |
| 2025– | Bolivia | 4 | (0) |
- * Club domestic league appearances and goals as of 22:14 (UTC) 16 September 2026 ‡ National team caps and goals as of 30 September 2026

Jesús Maraude (born 2 February 2008) is a Bolivian professional footballer who plays as an attacking midfielder for Club Always Ready and the Bolivia national football team.

== Early and personal life ==
Born in Tarija, he is the son of Argentine footnall coach and former player Juan Alberto Maraude. Maraude began playing as a child in San José de Tarija and later moved to García Ágreda and subsequently played for Albiceleste, his father's soccer school. From the age of 12 years-old he was in the youth academy of Club Bolivar.

== Club career ==
At the start of 2025, he joined Club Always Ready. He made his debut in April 2025 against GV San José. Having won the league title with Club Always Ready he scored his scored his first professional goal against Club Deportivo Guabirá that year.

== International career ==
Maraude played for the Bolivia U15 team at the 2023 South American U-15 Championship. He went on to be a key player and captain of the Bolivia national under-17 football team that played at the 2025 South American U-17 Championship and qualified for the 2025 FIFA U-17 World Cup, playing as a number 10. Playing at the championships in Qatar, he scored a panenka style penalty kick against South Africa.

Maraude was called up to the senior Bolivia national football team for their match against Peru in 2025. He continued with the national team in the friendly match against Trinidad and Tobago on 15 March 2026, in a 3–0 win.

== Career statistics ==
=== International ===
As of matches played 30 September 2026

Appearances and goals by national team and year
| National team | Year | Apps | Goals |
|---|---|---|---|
| Bolivia | 2025 | 1 | 0 |
| Bolivia | 2026 | 3 | 0 |
| Total | | 4 | 0 |

== Honours ==
=== National titles ===
| Title | Club | Country | Year |
|---|---|---|---|
| Bolivian Primera División | Club Always Ready | Bolivia | 2025 |
