= Doyle Vaca =

Bolivian footballer (born 1979)

Personal information
- Full name: Juan Doyle Vaca Mendoza
- Date of birth: October 8, 1979 (age 47)
- Place of birth: Santa Cruz de la Sierra, Bolivia
- Height: 1.79 m (5 ft 10 1/2 in)
- Position: Centre back

Senior career*
Years	Team	Apps	(Gls)
1998	The Strongest	29	(2)
1999	Independiente Petrolero	?	(?)
2000–2002	The Strongest	96	(6)
2003	San José	30	(2)
2004–2005	The Strongest	73	(6)
2006	Oriente Petrolero	35	(5)
2007	Bolívar	23	(2)
2008–2009	The Strongest	28	(1)
2009–2010	Real Mamoré		
2011–2012	Guabirá		

International career
2001–2005	Bolivia	4	(1)
- * Club domestic league appearances and goals

Juan Doyle Vaca Mendoza (born 8 October 1979 in Santa Cruz de la Sierra) is a Bolivian retired football defender.

== National team ==
Vaca made his debut for the Bolivia national team on October 7, 2001, in a World Cup qualifying match against Ecuador, as a 32nd-minute substitute for Sergio Rogelio Castillo. Since then he has scored once for the national squad.

=== International goals ===
Scores and results list Bolivia's goal tally first.

No	Date	Venue	Opponent	Score	Result	Competition
1.	3 September 2005	Estadio Hernando Siles, La Paz, Bolivia	Ecuador	1–1	1–2	2006 FIFA World Cup qualification
