= Néstor Colinas =

Bolivian football manager

Personal information
- Full name: Nestor Domingo Colinas Martínez
- Date of birth: 10 December 1989 (age 36)
- Place of birth: Paraguay
- Position: Goalkeeper

Team information
- Current team: Real Oruro (youth manager)

Senior career*
| Years | Team | Apps | (Gls) |
| 2009 | Deportivo Cristal | | |
| 2010 | Atlético La Joya | | |
| 2011 | Oruro Royal | | |
| 2011 | Frontanilla | | |
| 2012 | Oruro Royal | | |
| 2013 | Huanuni | | |
| 2013 | Deportivo Escara | | |
| 2014 | Sur-Car | | |
| 2015–2016 | Deportivo Escara | | |
| 2017 | San José | | |

Managerial career
- 2021: San José (assistant)
- 2022–2023: Real Oruro (assistant)
- 2024–: Real Oruro (youth)
- 2025: Real Oruro (interim)
- 2026: Real Oruro (interim)
- * Club domestic league appearances and goals

Nestor Domingo Colinas Martínez (born 10 December 1989) is a Paraguayan football manager and former player who played as a goalkeeper. He is the current manager of Bolivian club Real Oruro's youth categories.

== Playing career ==
Born in Paraguay, Colinas spent the most of his career in Bolivia, playing for teams in the region of Oruro. He represented Deportivo Cristal, Atlético La Joya, Oruro Royal, Frontanilla, Huanuni, Deportivo Escara, Sur-Car and San José.

== Managerial career ==
After retiring, Colinas became an assistant of Domingo Sánchez at his last club San José in 2021. He followed Sánchez to Real Oruro in the following year, before becoming the manager of the club's under-19 team in 2024.

On 30 July 2025, Colinas was named interim manager of Real Oruro, after Marcelo Straccia resigned. Back to his previous role after the arrival of Marcelo Robledo, he was again named interim on 28 April 2026, after Robledo left.
