= Artur Costa =

Artur Costa may refer to:

- Artur da Costa e Silva (1899-1969), Brazilian Army Martial and president of Brazilian military government
- Artur Costa (swimmer) (born 1970), Portuguese swimmer
- Artur Costa (football manager) (born 1980), Brazilian football manager
