= Gustavo Peredo =

Bolivian association football player (born 2000)

Personal information
- Full name: Gustavo Peredo Ortiz
- Date of birth: 7 April 2000 (age 26)
- Place of birth: Montero, Bolivia
- Height: 1.70 m (5 ft 7 in)
- Position: Forward

Team information
- Current team: Guabirá
- Number: 7

Youth career
- -2018: Guabirá

Senior career*
| Years | Team | Apps | (Gls) |
| 2018– | Guabirá | 201 | (30) |
- * Club domestic league appearances and goals as of 27 May 2026 ‡ National team caps and goals as of 23:06, 4 September 2025 (UTC)

Gustavo Peredo Ortiz (born 7 April 2000) is a Bolivian professional footballer who plays as a forward for Club Deportivo Guabirá in the Bolivian Primera División.

== Club career ==
He is from Montero, Bolivia. He started playing for the Club Deportivo Guabirá youth team at an early age. He was playing for the Guabirá reserve team prior to receiving his first call-up to train with the first-team in 2017. He made his first-team debut in 2018, featuring as a second-half substitute away against Club Bolívar in La Paz, in a 3–0 defeat. By 2021, he was a regular starter for the first-team, and also featured for the club in the Copa Sudamericana that year.

Continuing to play for Club Deportivo Guabirá in the Bolivian Primera División, he had a run of goalscoring form in 2025 to the extent that he became the leading Bolivian goalscorer in the league during that 2025 season under head coach Marcelo Straccia. He reached double figures in goals by the August of that year, in just fifteen appearances, frequently coming from the right wing into goal scoring positions. His performances that season included a hat-trick in a 3-1 league win against CDT Real Oruro in May 2025.

== International career ==
On 26 August 2025, he was called up to the Bolivia national football team ahead of their FIFA World Cup qualifying matches against Colombia and Brazil on the 4th and 8th of September.
