= Joaquín Barro =

Argentine footballer

Personal information
- Full name: Joaquín Barro
- Date of birth: 9 March 2001 (age 25)
- Place of birth: San Salvador de Jujuy, Argentina
- Height: 1.91 m (6 ft 3 in)
- Position: Centre-back

Team information
- Current team: Guabirá
- Number: 2

Youth career
- Gimnasia Jujuy

Senior career*
Years	Team	Apps	(Gls)
2017–2022	Gimnasia Jujuy	3	(0)
2018–2019	→ Talleres (loan)	0	(0)
2025	Club Atlético Germinal	13	(1)
2025–	Guabirá	8	(0)
- * Club domestic league appearances and goals as of 30 December 2025

Joaquín Barro (born 9 March 2001) is an Argentine professional footballer who plays as a centre-back for Bolivian club Guabirá.

== Career ==
Barro's career started with Gimnasia y Esgrima. After being moved into Carlos Morales Santos' senior squad during the 2016–17 Primera B Nacional campaign, Barro was selected for his professional debut on 30 July 2017 during a victory away to Crucero del Norte. That was the defender's only appearance in a season which Gimnasia y Esgrima finished eighteenth. In January 2018, Barro was signed on loan by Argentine Primera División side Talleres.

== Career statistics ==
As of 31 October 2018.

Club statistics
Club	Season	League			Cup (Note: Includes the Copa Argentina)		League Cup		Continental (Note: Includes the Copa Libertadores)		Other		Total	
Club	Season	Division	Apps	Goals	Apps	Goals	Apps	Goals	Apps	Goals	Apps	Goals	Apps	Goals
Gimnasia y Esgrima	2016–17	Primera B Nacional	1	0	0	0	—		—		0	0	1	0
Gimnasia y Esgrima	2017–18	Primera B Nacional	0	0	0	0	—		—		0	0	0	0
Gimnasia y Esgrima	2018–19	Primera B Nacional	0	0	0	0	—		—		0	0	0	0
Gimnasia y Esgrima	Total		1	0	0	0	—		—		0	0	1	0
Talleres (loan)	2018–19	Primera División	0	0	0	0	—		0	0	0	0	0	0
Career total			1	0	0	0	—		0	0	0	0	1	0
