= Jhonny Serrudo =

Bolivian footballer and manager (born 1981)

Personal information
- Full name: Jhonny Serrudo Quispe
- Date of birth: 14 September 1981 (age 45)
- Place of birth: Sucre, Bolivia

Team information
- Current team: 1º de Mayo de Trinidad (manager)

Youth career
- Independiente Petrolero

Senior career*
Years	Team	Apps	(Gls)
1997–2003	Independiente Petrolero		
2007	San José		
2008	Nacional Potosí		
2016	Atlético Sucre		

Managerial career
- 2016–2017: Atlético Sucre
- 2018: Deportivo Alemán
- 2019–2020: Fancesa
- 2021–2022: Universitario de Sucre
- 2022: Mojocoya
- 2023: Petrolero
- 2023: Deportivo FATIC
- 2023: CDT Real Oruro
- 2024–: 1º de Mayo de Trinidad
- * Club domestic league appearances and goals

Jhonny Serrudo Quispe (born 14 September 1981) is a Bolivian football manager and former player. He is the current manager of 1º de Mayo de Trinidad.

== Career ==
Serrudo played for local sides before retiring in 2016 with Atlético Sucre. He started his managerial career with the same club in the same year, and subsequently managed Deportivo Alemán in the 2018 season.

Serrudo was appointed manager of Fancesa in 2019, narrowly missing out promotion in 2020. He took over Universitario de Sucre in 2021, and renewed with the club after leading them to the Primera División.

On 1 May 2022, Serrudo was sacked by La "U".
