= Mirko Tomianovic =

Bolivian footballer (born 2001)

Personal information
- Full name: Mirko Tomianovic Becerra
- Date of birth: 1 October 2001 (age 25)
- Place of birth: Bolivia
- Height: 1.67 m (5 ft 6 in)
- Position: Midfielder

Team information
- Current team: Nacional Potosí
- Number: 50

Youth career
- –2018: Bolívar
- 2018–2019: Always Ready

Senior career*
Years	Team	Apps	(Gls)
2019-2020	Always Ready	16	(1)
2020–2024	Royal Pari	49	(4)
2024–2025	Real Tomayapo	42	(1)
2025–	Oriente Petrolero	6	(0)

International career
2017	Bolivia U17		
- * Club domestic league appearances and goals as of 30 December 2025

Mirko Tomianovic Becerra (born 1 October 2001) is a Bolivian professional footballer who plays as a midfielder for Bolivian side Nacional Potosí.

== Playing career ==
=== Club career ===
Tomianovic was a member of the Bolívar youth team until 2018, when he joined Always Ready. In early 2019, at the age of 17, he was called up to the first team by manager Julio César Baldivieso. He made his professional debut on April 21, playing the first half of a 1–0 defeat to Blooming before being replaced by Marcos Ovejero.

=== International career ===
In 2017, Tomianovic represented the national under-17 team at the 2017 Bolivarian Games.

== Career statistics ==
=== Club ===
As of 30 August 2019.

Club	Season	League			Cup		Continental		Other		Total	
Club	Season	Division	Apps	Goals	Apps	Goals	Apps	Goals	Apps	Goals	Apps	Goals
Always Ready	2019	Bolivian Primera División	9	1	0	0	–		0	0	11	1
FC Royal Pari	2020	Bolivian Primera División	10	1	-	-	-	-	-	-	10	1
FC Royal Pari	2021	Bolivian Primera División	15	3	-	-	1	0	-	-	15	3
FC Royal Pari	2022	Bolivian Primera División	10	0	-	-	-	-	-	-	10	0
FC Royal Pari	2023	Bolivian Primera División	14	0	5	0	-	-	-	-	19	0
CD Real Tomayopo	2024	Bolivian Primera División	31	1	-	-	5	0	-	-	36	1
CD Real Tomayopo	2025	Bolivian Primera División	11	0	1	0	-	-	-	-	12	0
Career total			102	6	6	0	6	0	0	0	113	6
