= Luis Alí =

Bolivian footballer (born 1994)

Personal information
- Full name: Luis Alberto Alí Vega
- Date of birth: 17 April 1994 (age 32)
- Place of birth: Tupiza, Bolivia
- Height: 1.71 m (5 ft 7 in)
- Position: Forward

Team information
- Current team: Totora Real Oruro

Youth career
- Huracán
- La Paz
- Lleida
- 2010–2012: Osasuna

Senior career*
Years	Team	Apps	(Gls)
2012–2014	Osasuna B	23	(1)
2013–2014	→ Erri-Berri (loan)	12	(0)
2014–2017	Bolívar	9	(1)
2015–2017	→ San José (loan)	65	(18)
2017–2018	Ponte Preta	2	(0)
2018	Hermannstadt	5	(0)
2019–2020	Bolívar	3	(0)
2021–2022	Independiente	36	(3)
2022	Universitario de Vinto	15	(1)
2023	Real Tomayapo	27	(1)
2024	GV San José	15	(2)
2025–	Totora Real Oruro	0	(0)

International career^{‡}
2017–	Bolivia	5	(0)
- * Club domestic league appearances and goals as of 20:03, 3 March 2022 (UTC) ‡ National team caps and goals as of 5 January 2018

Luis Alberto Alí Vega (born 17 April 1994) is a Bolivian footballer who plays as a forward for Independiente Petrolero.

== Club career ==
Born in La Paz, Alí represented Argentinian club Club Atlético Huracán, La Paz F.C., Spanish club UE Lleida as a youth, before switching to the academy of CA Osasuna on 5 July 2010. While at Lleida, he was a target of Real Madrid, Chelsea, Tottenham Hotspur and FC Barcelona. He scored his first goal for the reserves in a 2–1 defeat against Racing de Santander B. In 2013, he was loaned out to Erri-Berri.

In 2014, Alí signed for Bolivian club Club Bolívar and was loaned off to Club Deportivo San José after being found surplus; scoring a career best of 14 goals in the 2016–17 season.

Alí moved abroad and signed for Brazilian club Ponte Preta on 10 July 2017. On 20 August 2017, he made his first team debut in a 2–1 home win against Botafogo, replacing Lucca in the 77th minute.

Alí re-joined Club Bolívar for the 2019 season. A month after arriving at Bolívar, Alí torn his posterior cruciate ligament and the radial meniscus of his left knee. He returned to play six and a half months later, before shortly after suffering a fibula fracture. His contract with Bolívar was due to expire in December 2019, but was extended while he completed recovery, until March. After a horrible season due to the two injuries he suffered, with operations included, Alí left the club at the end of the year when his contract expired, after the club chose not to renew it.

Alí remained without club until January 2021, where he signed with Independiente Petrolero.

== Honours ==
Bolívar

- Bolivian First Division (2): 2014 Apertura, 2015 Clausura
