= Diego Umaña =

Colombian footballer (born 1951)

Personal information
- Full name: Diego Édison Umaña Peñaranda
- Date of birth: 12 March 1951 (age 75)
- Place of birth: Cali, Colombia
- Height: 1.74 m (5 ft 9 in)
- Position: Midfielder

Team information
- Current team: Deportes Quindío (youth manager)

Senior career*
Years	Team	Apps	(Gls)
1969–1979	Deportivo Cali		
1980–1981	Atlético Bucaramanga		
1982	Millonarios		
1983–1986	Santa Fe		

International career
1975–1981	Colombia	8	(0)

Managerial career
- 1987: Once Caldas
- 1988–1989: Santa Fe
- 1991–1994: América de Cali (youth)
- 1992: América de Cali (caretaker)
- 1993: América de Cali (caretaker)
- 1994–1996: América de Cali
- 1996: Barcelona SC
- 1997: Millonarios
- 1998: América de Cali
- 1999: Deportes Tolima
- 2000–2001: Millonarios
- 2003: Centauros Villavicencio
- 2004–2005: Deportes Quindío
- 2006–2007: Deportes Quindío
- 2007–2009: América de Cali
- 2010: Junior
- 2011–2012: Juan Aurich
- 2013: América de Cali
- 2016–2017: Sport Huancayo
- 2017: Rionegro Águilas
- 2022–: Deportes Quindío (youth)
- * Club domestic league appearances and goals

Diego Édison Umaña Peñaranda (born 12 March 1951) is a Colombian football manager and former player who played as a midfielder. He is the current manager of Deportes Quindío's youth categories.

Umaña played in eight matches for the Colombia national football team from 1975 to 1981. He was also part of Colombia's squad for the 1975 Copa América tournament. His son Giancarlo is also a manager.
