= Alejandro Bejarano =

Bolivian footballer (born 1984)

Personal information
- Full name: Alejandro René Bejarano Sajama
- Date of birth: 21 June 1984 (age 42)
- Place of birth: Jujuy Province, Argentina
- Height: 1.70 m (5 ft 7 in)
- Position: Midfielder

Team information
- Current team: Independiente Petrolero

Senior career*
Years	Team	Apps	(Gls)
2003–2007	San José	211	(6)
2007–2008	Jorge Wilstermann	29	(1)
2008–2009	The Strongest		
2009–2010	Talleres de Perico		
2010–2011	San José	48	(5)
2011–2012	The Strongest	20	(0)
2012–2016	Universitario de Sucre	134	(8)
2016–2017	Real Potosí	31	(1)
2017	Universitario de Sucre	19	(0)
2019	Always Ready	32	(2)
2020	Guabirá	5	(0)
2021–	Independiente Petrolero	54	(0)
- * Club domestic league appearances and goals as of 1 January 2023

Alejandro René Bejarano Sajama (born 21 June 1984) is an Argentine Naturalized Bolivian footballer who plays as a midfielder for Bolivian Primera División club Independiente Petrolero.

== Honours ==
Universitario de Sucre

- Bolivian Primera División: 2014 Clausura
