= David Quiruchi =

Bolivian football manager

Personal information
- Full name: David Quiruchi Villca
- Place of birth: Uncía, Bolivia

Managerial career
- Years: Team
- 2022: Astor (women)
- 2025: Aurora (interim)
- 2025: Aurora

David Quiruchi Villca is a Bolivian football manager.

== Career ==
Born in Uncía, Quiruchi was in charge of the women's team of hometown club Astor during the 2022 Bolivian women's football championship, named Copa Simón Bolívar, and reached the finals of the competition. He later worked at Oruro Royal as a goalkeeping coach, before joining Aurora in 2024, under the same role.

On 23 May 2025, Quiruchi was named interim manager of Aurora, after Daniel Farrar left. With the club seriously threatened with relegation due to a 33-point deduction, he subsequently became a permanent manager of the side.

On 2 October 2025, Quiruchi was sacked after the club lost any chances of a permanent survival in the season.
