= Artur Costa (football manager) =

Brazilian football coach (born 1980)

Personal information
- Full name: Artur William Costa
- Date of birth: 1 June 1980 (age 46)
- Place of birth: Brazil

Team information
- Current team: GV San José (manager)

Managerial career
- Years: Team
- 2010: São Caetano U15
- 2012: Guarulhos U15
- 2013: Atibaia U15
- 2013: Juventus-SP U15
- 2014: São Vicente U17
- 2014: São Vicente U20
- 2014: São Vicente
- 2015: Diadema U17
- 2015: Diadema
- 2016: Santo André U20
- 2018–2019: Portuguesa U17
- 2021: União Suzano U20
- 2022: Mauaense U20
- 2023: Sharjah Brasil U20
- 2024: Independente de Limeira U20
- 2025: Destroyers
- 2026: São Caetano U20
- 2026: São Caetano (interim)
- 2026: São Caetano (interim)
- 2026: GV San José (interim)
- 2026–: GV San José

Artur William Costa (born 1 June 1980) is a Brazilian football coach, currently the manager of Bolivian club GV San José.

== Career ==
Costa worked in several youth categories of the state of São Paulo before having his first senior experience with São Vicente, in the 2014 Campeonato Paulista Segunda Divisão. In the following year, he also coached Diadema in the same division.

Costa subsequently worked with the under-20 squad of Santo André and the under-17 team of Portuguesa before becoming a coordinator of Bolívar's academy in São Paulo in 2020. He returned to coaching duties in the following year, working at União Suzano under-20s, before being appointed in charge of Mauaense in the same category in February 2022.

Costa was also an under-20 coach at Sharjah Brasil and Independente de Limeira before moving to Bolivia for the 2025 season, taking over Destroyers. On 19 March 2026, he returned to São Caetano after being appointed head coach of the under-20s.

Costa acted as an interim head coach of the Azulão on two occasions during the 2026 Copa Paulista, before departing the club in September and returning to Bolivia to join the staff of GV San José. He was an interim manager between the spells of Humberto Viviani and Miguel Ángel Zahzú, before being appointed himself the manager until the end of the season on 22 September.
