= Daniel Sagman =

Argentine football manager

Personal information
- Full name: Eduardo Daniel Sagman
- Date of birth: 21 June 1979 (age 47)
- Place of birth: Buenos Aires, Argentina

Youth career
- Years: Team
- Sportivo Italiano
- Almagro
- Comunicaciones

Managerial career
- 2015: Sportivo Unión San Miguel
- 2015–2017: Juventud Unida
- 2018–2022: JJ Urquiza
- 2022: San Miguel
- 2022: JJ Urquiza
- 2024: Platense (assistant)
- 2024: Real Tomayapo (assistant)
- 2024: Petrolero
- 2025: Real Tomayapo

Eduardo Daniel Sagman (born 21 June 1979) is an Argentine football manager.

== Career ==
Born in Buenos Aires, Sagman played for Sportivo Italiano, Almagro and Comunicaciones as a youth before retiring from football at the age of 19. As the minimum age for a managerial degree was 30, he went on to work at the Instituto de Bella Vista as a math teacher for ten years.

After obtaining his managerial license, Sagman began his career in charge of Sportivo Unión de San Miguel in 2015, before taking over Juventud Unida shortly after. Ahead of the 2018 season, he was named manager of JJ Urquiza.

Sagman's led JJ to a first-ever promotion to the Primera B Metropolitana, and reached the final rounds of the 2019–20 Copa Argentina. His different managerial methods became known due to the latter feat, as he taught players chess or trained their reactions with LED lights.

Sagman resigned from Jota in February 2022, and took over San Miguel on 8 March. Sacked in April, he returned to JJ Urquiza on 10 August.

In February 2024, after more than a year without a club, Sagman joined Platense as an assistant of duo Favio Orsi and Sergio Gómez. He left the club in June to move abroad, as an assistant of compatriot Pablo Rubinich at Bolivian Primera División side Real Tomayapo.

Sagman left Tomayapo in October 2024 to return to managerial duties, at Petrolero. On 11 July 2025, he returned to Real Tomayapo, now as manager, but was sacked on 2 October.
