= César Couceiro =

Argentine footballer

Personal information
- Full name: César Hugo Couceiro
- Date of birth: April 18, 1970 (age 56)
- Place of birth: Buenos Aires, Argentina
- Height: 1.85 m (6 ft 1 in)
- Position: Defender

Senior career*
Years	Team	Apps	(Gls)
1990–1993	Nueva Chicago	73	(4)
1993–1997	Huracán	67	(1)
1997–1998	Atlanta	26	(0)
1998–2000 / 2001	Blooming	107	(10)
2000	Veracruz	8	(0)
2002	Unión Central	7	(1)
2002–2003	Almagro	26	(1)
2004–2005	Deportivo Laferrere	21	(1)
2005–2006	Villa Dálmine	12	(0)
- * Club domestic league appearances and goals

César Hugo Couceiro (born April 18, 1970, in Buenos Aires) is a former Argentine football defender. In his native country he played for senior clubs such as Huracán, Nueva Chicago and Atlanta. He also made a spell in the Liga de Fútbol Profesional Boliviano with Blooming where he was part of back-to-back national titles in 1998 and 1999.

During 2000 he played in Mexico for a short period with Veracruz before returning to Bolivia to rejoin the celestes. In 2002, he transferred to Bolivian side Unión Central, but after a few weeks into the season he decided to go back to Argentina where he signed for second division club Almagro. The following season, he played for Deportivo Laferrere, a team from the Primera C Metropolitana before culminating his career with Villa Dálmine in 2006.

== Club titles ==
Season	Club	Title
1998	Blooming	Liga de Fútbol Profesional Boliviano
1999	Blooming	Liga de Fútbol Profesional Boliviano
