= São Vicente Atlético Clube =

São Vicente
- Full name: São Vicente Atlético Clube
- Nickname(s): Marquês; Feitiço; Calungão
- Founded: April 21, 1928
- Ground: Estádio Mansueto Pierotti
- Capacity: 4,912
Home colours	Away colours

São Vicente Atlético Clube, commonly known as São Vicente, is a currently inactive Brazilian football club based in São Vicente, São Paulo. The club was formerly known as Juvenil Feitiço and as Feitiço Atlético Clube.

== History ==
The club was founded on April 21, 1928, by local sportsmen as Juvenil Feitiço, named after footballer Feitiço. The club was renamed to Feitiço Atlético Clube in 1935, and on April 28, 1950, the club was renamed to São Vicente Atlético Clube. They professionalized its football department in 2002.

== Stadium ==
São Vicente Atlético Clube play their home games at Estádio Mansueto Pierotti. The stadium has a maximum capacity of 4,912 people.
