= Gabriel Nasta =

Argentine football manager (born 1970)

Personal information
- Full name: Ángel Gabriel Nasta
- Date of birth: 31 May 1970 (age 56)
- Place of birth: Pergamino, Argentina
- Position: Centre-back

Youth career
- Argentino de Pergamino
- 1989: Vélez Sarsfield

Senior career*
Years	Team	Apps	(Gls)
1990	Gimnasia y Tiro		
1991	Sports Salto	9	(0)
1992–1994	Douglas Haig		
1995	Huracán de San Rafael		
1995	Deportiva Catriel		
1996	CUSA	11	(1)
1996–1997	Douglas Haig		
1998	Deportivo Cuenca	27	(4)
1998	Deportivo Quito		
1998	Douglas Haig		
1999–2001	Los Andes	48	(1)
2001	Almagro	12	(0)
2002	Godoy Cruz	16	(1)
2002–2003	San Martín de Mendoza	32	(5)
2003	Blooming	10	(0)
2003–2005	Guillermo Brown	12	(0)

Managerial career
- 2006–2011: Guillermo Brown (youth)
- 2011: Guillermo Brown (interim)
- 2012–2015: Sports Salto
- 2017: Sports Salto
- 2019–2020: Sports Salto
- 2020–2021: Douglas Haig
- 2021: Douglas Haig
- 2023: Juventud Antoniana
- 2023: FADEP
- 2024: Atlético Chicoana
- 2024: Defensores de Pronunciamento
- 2024: Cipolletti
- 2025: Guillermo Brown
- 2025: Sports Salto
- 2026: Real Tomayapo
- * Club domestic league appearances and goals

Ángel Gabriel Nasta (born 31 May 1970) is an Argentine football manager and former player who played as a centre-back.

== Playing career ==
Born in Pergamino, Nasta left his hometown in 1989 to play for Vélez Sarsfield, before signing for Gimnasia y Tiro in the following year. He enjoyed a brief spell at Sports Salto before moving to Douglas Haig in 1992.

After spending two years mainly training at Douglas Haig, Nasta left in 1994, and represented Huracán de San Rafael, Deportiva Catriel and CUSA before returning to Douglas. He moved abroad in 1997, and played for Ecuadorian sides Deportivo Cuenca and Deportivo Quito before again rejoining Douglas Haig in late 1998.

Released after a few matches, Nasta joined Los Andes in 1999, reuniting with former Deportivo Cuenca manager Jorge Ginarte. He helped the club to achieve promotion to Primera División in the following year, but lost his starting spot after the arrival of Miguel Ángel Russo as manager, and left for Almagro and then Godoy Cruz.

Nesta subsequently moved to Godoy Cruz's rivals San Martín de Mendoza, before agreeing to a contract with Bolivian side Blooming in July 2003. Back to Argentina after five months, he joined Guillermo Brown and retired with the club in 2005.

== Managerial career ==
Shortly after retiring, Nasta began working at his last club Guillermo Brown as a manager of the youth sides. On 15 September 2011, he was named interim manager of the first team, before taking over Sports Salto in the following year.

Nasta left Sports Salto in 2015, but returned to the club on 28 August 2017. He ended his second spell in November, after avoiding relegation from the Torneo Federal B, but returned again in 2019.

On 3 October 2020, Nasta returned to Douglas Haig, now as manager of the side in Torneo Federal A. He resigned the following 20 February, but returned to the club on 21 June 2021.

Nasta resigned from Douglas again on 24 August 2022, and agreed to become the manager of Juventud Antoniana on 27 December. He left the club on 12 July 2023, and took over amateur side FADEP on 7 October.

On 21 May 2024, Nasta was named Defensores de Pronunciamento manager, but lasted less than a month at the club. He was appointed in charge of Cipolletti on 3 July, but announced he would depart the side at the end of the season on 30 September.

On 18 February 2025, Nasta returned to Guillermo Brown after nearly 14 years, now as permanent manager. He was sacked on 13 May, and returned to Sports Salto for a fourth spell on 23 July.

On 10 January 2026, Sports Salto announced Nasta's departure after he accepted an offer from Bolivian side Real Tomayapo. On 6 April, after a 4–0 on his league debut, he was sacked.
