= Gabriel Montaño =

Bolivian footballer (born 2000)

Personal information
- Full name: Diego Hernán Montaño Moizán
- Date of birth: 23 June 1999 (age 27)
- Place of birth: Cochabamba, Bolivia
- Height: 1.71 m (5 ft 7 in)
- Position: Winger

Youth career
- Aurora

Senior career*
Years	Team	Apps	(Gls)
2019–2024	Aurora	30	(9)
- * Club domestic league appearances and goals as of 8 December 2024

Diego Hernán Montaño Moizán (born 23 June 1999), known as Gabriel Montaño, is a Bolivian professional footballer who plays as a winger.

== Club career ==
Born in Cochabamba, Montaño was a youth product of hometown side Aurora. He made his first team – and Primera División – debut at the age of 19 (but reportedly at age 14 at the time) on 15 December 2019, starting in a 5–0 away loss to Bolívar as the club only played with under-17 players and subsequently lost by walkover after only six players appeared for the second half.

Montaño scored his first senior goal on 12 December 2021, netting Aurora's second in a 4–3 home loss to Always Ready.

== International career ==
On 23 August 2024, Montaño was called up to the Bolivia national team by manager Óscar Villegas for two 2026 FIFA World Cup qualification matches against Venezuela and Chile.

== Documentation issues ==
On 13 December 2024, Montaño was accused of falsifying a birth certificate, being de facto born in 1999 as "Diego Montaño". Despite Aurora presenting the player's registration four days later with his name as "Gabriel Montaño Moizán" and his birth on 15 February 2005, it was later revealed on 3 January 2025 that Montaño did not have a birth registration in the official records.

On 15 January 2025, Montaño recognized that his name is "Diego Hernán Montaño Moizán" and that he was born on 23 June 1999. He also claimed that Aurora and their president Jaime Cornejo "did not know anything". On 28 February, he was suspended for two years for identity theft, as he impersonated his deceased brother to become a professional.
