= Giancarlo Umaña =

Colombian footballer and manager (born 1982)

Personal information
- Full name: Diego Giancarlo Umaña Lasso
- Date of birth: 24 March 1982 (age 44)
- Place of birth: Cali, Colombia
- Height: 1.86 m (6 ft 1 in)

Team information
- Current team: Real Potosí (manager)

Senior career*
Years	Team	Apps	(Gls)
2002	El Cóndor		
2003	Centauros Villavicencio		
2004–2005	Deportes Quindío		
2006	Bogotá		

Managerial career
- 2008–2009: América de Cali (assistant)
- 2010: Junior (assistant)
- 2011–2012: Juan Aurich (assistant)
- 2013: América de Cali (assistant)
- 2016–2017: Sport Huancayo (assistant)
- 2017–2018: Rionegro Águilas (assistant)
- 2018–2022: Águilas Doradas (youth)
- 2025: San Antonio Bulo Bulo (assistant)
- 2026: Aurora
- 2026–: Real Potosí
- * Club domestic league appearances and goals

Diego Giancarlo Umaña Lasso (born 24 March 1982) is a Colombian football manager and former player. He is the current manager of Bolivian club Real Potosí.

== Playing career ==
Born in Cali, Umaña began playing for El Cóndor in 2002, before moving to Centauros Villavicencio in the following year. Managed by his father, he followed him to Deportes Quindío in 2004.

Umaña retired in late 2006, after playing for Bogotá, aged just 24.

== Coaching career ==
After retiring, Umaña began working with his father in 2008, as his assistant at América de Cali. He continued to work in the same role in the following years, at Junior, Juan Aurich, América de Cali again, Sport Huancayo and Rionegro Águilas.

After his father left Águilas in 2017, Umaña remained at the club as an assistant, being later a manager of their youth sides. In June 2025, he moved to Bolivia to work as Pedro Depablos' assistant at San Antonio Bulo Bulo.

On 6 January 2026, Umaña was appointed manager of Aurora also in Bolivia. On 23 August, he left by mutual consent, and took over fellow league team Real Potosí on 1 September.

== Personal life ==
Umaña's father, also named Diego, was also a footballer and is also a manager.
