= Leonardo Eguez =

Bolivian footballer (born 1990)

Personal information
- Full name: Jesús Leonardo Eguez Rivero
- Date of birth: 28 September 1990 (age 36)
- Place of birth: Santa Cruz de la Sierra, Bolivia

Team information
- Current team: Guabirá (manager)

Managerial career
- Years: Team
- 2014: Bancruz Pirai (assistant)
- 2015: Oriente Petrolero (youth)
- 2016: 24 de Septiembre (assistant)
- 2019: Guabirá (assistant)
- 2019: Guabirá (interim)
- 2020: Nacional Potosí (assistant)
- 2020: San Felipe
- 2021–2023: Oriente Petrolero (reserves)
- 2023: Oriente Petrolero (interim)
- 2023–2024: Universitario de Vinto (assistant)
- 2024: San Antonio Bulo Bulo
- 2025: Independiente Petrolero
- 2025–2026: Nacional Potosí
- 2026–: Guabirá

Jesús Leonardo Eguez Rivero (born 28 September 1990) is a Bolivian football manager, currently in charge of Guabirá.

== Career ==
Born in Santa Cruz de la Sierra, Eguez began his career as an assistant of Bancruz Pirai in 2014. In the following year, he was manager of Oriente Petrolero's under-15 squad, before returning to assistant duties in 2016 with 24 de Septiembre.

In 2019, after nearly two years back at Oriente as an analyst of Ronald Arana, Eguez followed Arana to Guabirá, as his assistant. In March of that year, he was named interim manager of the club.

Ahead of the 2020 season, Eguez became Jeaustin Campos' assistant at Nacional Potosí. He left in March after Campos was sacked, and took over lowly local side San Felipe.

Eguez returned to Oriente in 2021, as a manager of the reserve team. In April 2023, he became an interim manager of the main squad, and returned to his previous role in the following month after the appointment of Guillermo Hoyos.

In July 2023, Eguez joined Pablo Godoy's staff at Universitario de Vinto. On 4 October of the following year, he left his role to take over San Antonio Bulo Bulo.

On 24 December 2024, San Antonio announced Eguez's departure from the club. The following 9 July, he took over fellow top tier side Independiente Petrolero.

On 9 September 2025, Eguez resigned from Independiente, and took over Nacional Potosí the following day. Sacked by the latter on 6 March of the following year, he returned to Guabirá three days later, now as permanent manager.

== Honours ==
Nacional Potosí

- Copa Bolivia: 2025
