= Felipe de la Riva =

Uruguayan footballer and manager (born 1973)

Personal information
- Full name: Luis Felipe de la Riva Tiribocci
- Date of birth: 28 May 1973 (age 53)
- Place of birth: Montevideo, Uruguay
- Height: 1.80 m (5 ft 11 in)
- Position: Midfielder

Senior career*
Years	Team	Apps	(Gls)
1991	Sud América		
1992–1993	Estudiantes BA		
1993	Deportivo Quito		
1994–1995	Deportivo Merlo		
1996–1998	Ituzaingó	9	(0)
1998–1999	San Telmo	56	(1)

Managerial career
- 2003: Juventud Unida
- 2003–2004: Leandro N. Alem
- 2004–2005: Flandria
- 2005–2006: San Miguel
- 2006–2007: Acassuso
- 2008–2011: Deportivo Merlo
- 2011–2012: Chacarita Juniors
- 2012: Tristán Suárez
- 2012–2014: Los Andes
- 2014: Almirante Brown
- 2015: Flandria
- 2015: Douglas Haig
- 2016: Los Andes
- 2016–2017: Almagro
- 2017–2018: Villa Dálmine
- 2018–2019: Agropecuario
- 2019–2020: Mitre
- 2020–2021: Villa Dálmine
- 2021: Defensores de Belgrano
- 2022: Acassuso
- 2022–2023: Flandria
- 2024: Deportivo Merlo
- 2025: Defensores Unidos
- 2025: Tacuary
- 2026: Deportivo Capiatá
- 2026: Real Tomayapo
- * Club domestic league appearances and goals

Luis Felipe de la Riva Tiribocci (born 28 May 1973) is a Uruguayan football manager and former player who played as a midfielder.
