= Eduardo Villegas =

Bolivian footballer and manager (born 1964)

Personal information
- Full name: Eduardo Andres Villegas Camarena
- Date of birth: 29 March 1964 (age 62)
- Place of birth: Cochabamba, Bolivia
- Height: 1.78 m (5 ft 10 in)
- Position: Defender

Team information
- Current team: ABB (sporting director)

Senior career*
Years	Team	Apps	(Gls)
1985	Petrolero de Cochabamba		
1986–1987	The Strongest		
1988	Blooming		
1989–1990	The Strongest		
1991	Jorge Wilstermann		
1992	The Strongest		
1993	San José		
1994	Bolívar		
1995–1996	San José		
1997	The Strongest		
1998–1999	Independiente Petrolero		

International career
1985–1989	Bolivia	16	(0)

Managerial career
- 2005: The Strongest
- 2006: Universitario de Sucre
- 2007: The Strongest
- 2008: Universitario de Sucre
- 2009–2010: Jorge Wilstermann
- 2009–2010: Bolivia (interim)
- 2011–2012: Universitario de Sucre
- 2012–2014: The Strongest
- 2014: Oriente Petrolero
- 2015: Bolívar
- 2016: Sport Boys Warnes
- 2017: Oriente Petrolero
- 2018–2019: San José
- 2019: Bolivia
- 2020: Always Ready
- 2021: Blooming
- 2022: Always Ready
- 2023–2024: GV San José
- 2024: Jorge Wilstermann
- 2025: Always Ready
- 2025: GV San José
- 2026: The Strongest
- 2026: Nacional Potosí
- * Club domestic league appearances and goals

Eduardo Andres Villegas Camarena (born 29 March 1964) is a Bolivian football manager and former player who played as a defender. He is the current sporting director of ABB.

== Club career ==
Villegas began his career at hometown club Petrolero de Cochabamba. In 1986, Villegas joined The Strongest, staying with the club for two seasons. In 1988, Villegas joined Blooming, before re-signing for The Strongest in time for the 1989 Bolivian Primera División, where he won the title with The Strongest. In 1991, Villegas signed for Wilstermann, winning the Copa Bolivia in his solitarity season at the club. In 1994, after a third spell with The Strongest and San José, Villegas signed for Bolívar, winning the Primera División. In 1995, Villegas re-joined San José, winning another Primera División. In 1997, Villegas joined The Strongest for a fourth spell, before signing for Independiente Petrolero in 1998, where he retired.

== International career ==
From 1985 to 1989, Villegas represented Bolivia 16 times, including at the 1987 and 1989 editions of the Copa América.

== Managerial career ==
During the 2005 Liga de Fútbol Profesional Boliviano, Villegas managed former club The Strongest, leading the club to a second-placed finish. In 2006, Villegas joined Universitario de Sucre as manager, before re-joining The Strongest a year later. In 2009, Villegas became Bolivia manager, serving in the role until November 2010. Following his spell with Bolivia, Villegas managed Wilstermann and Wilstermann, before once again re-joining The Strongest in March 2012. In 2014, Villegas was appointed manager of Oriente Petrolero, joining Bolívar a year later. In 2016, Villegas managed Sport Boys. In 2017, Villegas joined Oriente Petrolero, before joining San José in 2018. In January 2019, Villegas was appointed manager of Bolivia for a second time. He was fired after the 2019 Copa América where his team finished bottom.

== Personal life ==
Villegas' younger brother Óscar was also a footballer, and is also a manager. Both played together at San José in 1994 and later worked together for three years.

== Managerial Statistics ==
As of Match played 22 June 2019

Team	From	To	Record				
Team	From	To	G	W	D	L	Win %
Bolivia	15 January 2019	present	7	0	1	6	0.00
