= Marcelo Straccia =

Argentine football manager (born 1966)

Personal information
- Full name: Fabián Marcelo Straccia
- Date of birth: 27 June 1966 (age 60)
- Place of birth: Peyrano, Argentina
- Height: 1.81 m (5 ft 11 in)
- Position: Forward

Team information
- Current team: Real Oruro (technical director)

Youth career
- 1982–1986: Newell's Old Boys

Senior career*
Years	Team	Apps	(Gls)
1986–1991	Newell's Old Boys		
1991–1992	Racing de Córdoba		
1992–1993	Argentino de Rosario		
1993–1995	Alianza Atlético		
1996	Atlético Paz		
1996–1997	Independiente Rivadavia		
- Rivadavia de Necochea

Managerial career
- Newell's Old Boys (youth)
- 2002: Newell's Old Boys (assistant)
- 2003–2004: San Martín-SJ
- 2005: Belgrano (assistant)
- 2006: Juventud Unida
- 2006: Juventud Antoniana (assistant)
- 2006–2007: Gimnasia y Esgrima (CdU)
- 2007: Atlético Paz
- 2008–2009: Argentino de Rosario
- 2009: Almagro
- 2011: Atlético Sanford
- 2012: Melgar (assistant)
- 2013: Melgar
- 2014: Deportivo Merlo
- 2015: Juventud Unida
- 2015: Macará
- 2016: Deportivo Merlo
- 2017–2018: Colegiales
- 2018–2019: Deportivo Merlo
- 2020–2021: Independiente Rivadavia
- 2021: Apollon Larissa
- 2022: Círculo Deportivo
- 2023: Libertad Gran Mamoré
- 2024: Círculo Deportivo
- 2024: Real Santa Cruz
- 2025: Royal Pari
- 2025: Real Oruro
- 2025: Guabirá
- 2026: Universitario de Vinto
- 2026: Always Ready
- 2026: Universitario de Vinto
- * Club domestic league appearances and goals

Fabián Marcelo Straccia (born 27 June 1966) is an Argentine football manager and former player who played as a forward. He is the current technical director of Bolivian club Real Oruro.

== Playing career ==
Born in Peyrano, Straccia moved to Rosario at early age and was a youth graduate of Newell's Old Boys. He subsequently represented Racing de Córdoba, Argentino de Rosario, Alianza Atlético, Atlético Paz, Independiente Rivadavia and Rivadavia de Necochea before retiring.

== Managerial career ==
After retiring, Straccia worked as a youth coach at his first club Newell's, being also an assistant of Julio Zamora in the main squad in 2002. He also worked with Marcelo Bielsa in the 2002 FIFA World Cup, as a coordinator of the "sparring" players.

Straccia's first senior managerial experience occurred in 2003, being in charge of Primera B Nacional side San Martín de San Juan until 2004. He later worked as an assistant at Belgrano and Juventud Antoniana, being subsequently a manager of Gimnasia y Esgrima (CdU), Atlético Paz, Argentino de Rosario, Almagro and Atlético Sanford.

In 2012, Straccia reunited with Zamora after being his assistant at Peruvian side FBC Melgar. On 3 January 2013, after Zamora's departure, he became the manager of the club, but resigned on 10 March.

Straccia returned to his home country with Deportivo Merlo in December 2013, but left on a mutual agreement on 28 October 2014. In June 2015, after a brief period at Juventud Unida, he replaced Christian Gómez at the helm of Macará in Ecuador.

Straccia left Macará in December 2015, and returned to Merlo on 5 May 2016. He was sacked on 3 November, and took over Colegiales on 24 April 2017.

Dismissed from Colegiales on 10 February 2018, Straccia rejoined Merlo for a third spell on 22 October. He was sacked by the latter on 20 November 2019, and was named Independiente Rivadavia manager on 13 July 2020.

Straccia resigned from Independiente on 3 March 2021, and was appointed in charge of Greek club Apollon Larissa in June. He was relieved of his duties on 16 December, and took over Círculo Deportivo back in his home country on 28 July 2022.

Straccia left Círculo on 22 December 2022, and agreed to become a manager of Fénix for the 2024 season on 12 October 2023. On 9 November, however, he was named manager of Libertad Gran Mamoré of the Bolivian Primera División.

Straccia returned to Círculo in July 2024, before returning to Bolivia on 22 August, replacing compatriot Andrés Marinangeli at the helm of Real Santa Cruz. He resigned from the latter on 28 November, and spent a period at Royal Pari before taking over Real Oruro, also in the Bolivian top tier, on 4 June 2025.

Straccia left Real Oruro on 30 July 2025, and was appointed in charge of Guabirá the following day. He resigned from the latter on 16 December, after qualifying the club to the 2026 Copa Sudamericana, and took over Universitario de Vinto also in the top tier on 4 January 2026.

On 3 May 2026, Straccia left U de Vinto, and subsequently replaced Julio César Baldivieso at the helm of fellow league team Always Ready just hours later. Late in that month, however, he was sacked from the latter, and returned to Universitario on 8 August.

Straccia was dismissed by Universitario on 11 September 2026, and returned to Real Oruro five days later, but under the role of technical director (to comply with the rules of the Bolivian Football Federation which prevented the managers from coaching more than two clubs in the same season).
