= René Hinojosa =

Bolivian football manager (born 1995)

Personal information
- Full name: René Antonio Hinojosa Olguín
- Date of birth: 22 February 1995 (age 31)
- Place of birth: Cochabamba, Bolivia

Managerial career
- Years: Team
- 2019: Jorge Wilstermann (youth)
- 2021–2022: Jorge Wilstermann (reserves)
- 2023: Universitario de Vinto (assistant)
- 2024: Atlético Bermejo
- 2024: Municipal Tiquipaya
- 2024: San Antonio Bulo Bulo (assistant)
- 2025: Independiente Petrolero (assistant)
- 2025–2026: Independiente Petrolero
- 2026: Real Tomayapo

René Antonio Hinojosa Olguín (born 22 February 1995) is a Bolivian football manager.

== Career ==
Born in Cochabamba, Hinojosa began his career as a manager of Jorge Wilstermann's youth sides, before joining The Strongest in 2020 as an analyst. In 2021, he returned to Wilster as an assistant of the reserve team, before taking over the side in 2022.

In 2023, Hinojosa joined Universitario de Vinto as an assistant manager, before being appointed manager of Atlético Bermejo on 3 May 2024. He left the club late in the month, however, after alleging personal issues.

On 10 August 2024, Hinojosa was announced as Municipal Tiquipaya manager. He left the club in October, to join Leonardo Eguez's staff at San Antonio Bulo Bulo, as an assistant.

After leaving San Antonio in December 2024, Hinojosa followed Eguez to Independiente Petrolero in July 2025, again as his assistant. He became the manager of the side on 10 September, after Eguez left for Nacional Potosí.

On 13 March 2026, Hinojosa left Independiente by mutual consent. On 23 May, he took over fellow top tier side Real Tomayapo, but resigned on 8 August.
