= Mauricio Baldivieso =

Bolivian footballer (born 1996)

Personal information
- Full name: Pedro Mauricio Baldivieso Ferrufino
- Date of birth: 22 July 1996 (age 30)
- Place of birth: La Paz, Bolivia
- Height: 1.81 m (5 ft 11 in)
- Position: Midfielder

Youth career
- 2007–2009: Aurora

Senior career*
| Years | Team | Apps | (Gls) |
| 2009 | Aurora | 1 | (0) |
| 2011–2013 | Aurora | 19 | (3) |
| 2012 | → Real Potosi (loan) | 5 | (0) |
| 2013–2014 | Nacional Potosí | 16 | (0) |
| 2015 | Universitario de Sucre | 3 | (1) |
| 2015–2016 | Wilstermann | 8 | (1) |
| 2016–2018 | San José | 13 | (0) |

International career
| 2015 | Bolivia U20 | 1 | (0) |
- * Club domestic league appearances and goals

Mauricio Baldivieso (born 22 July 1996) is a Bolivian former professional footballer who last played as a midfielder for Club San José in the Liga de Fútbol Profesional Boliviano. At the age of 12, Baldivieso was the youngest player ever to play professional football when his father, Julio Baldivieso, who managed Club Aurora at the time, sent him on as a late substitute against La Paz on 19 July 2009, until his record was broken by 10-year-old Eric Godpower Marshall in April 2021.

== Club career ==
=== Aurora ===
In July 2009 Baldivieso played his first match in professional football for Aurora just a few days short of his 13th birthday when he came on as a late substitute in a Clausura fixture against La Paz.

He returned to Aurora in 2011 alongside his father, who took over for a second time as manager. Under his father's leadership, he made nineteen league appearances and scored three goals.

=== Real Potosi (loan) ===
In January 2012, Baldivieso joined Real Potosi on a loan deal which ended in June 2012.

=== Nacional Potosi ===
On 30 June 2013, Baldivieso signed for Liga de Fútbol Profesional Boliviano club Nacional Potosí on a free transfer. He made his debut for his new side on 4 August 2013, starting in a 2–0 win over his former club Aurora before being substituted in the 50th minute.

=== Universitario de Sucre ===
In 2015, he signed with Universitario de Sucre. He made three appearances and scored one goal with them.

=== Jorge Wilstermann ===
He played for Jorge Wilstermann from 2015 to 2016.

=== San Jose ===
After he left Jorge Wilstermann, he signed with Club San José. His contract expired in 2018.

== International career ==
Baldivieso was selected for the Bolivian U-20 team to play in the 2015 South American Youth Football Championship.

== Personal life ==
Baldivieso is the son of longtime Bolivian national player and former Aurora coach Julio César Baldivieso.
