= Sergio Castillo (footballer) =

Argentine-Bolivian footballer (born 1970)

Personal information
- Full name: Sergio Rogelio Castillo Arce
- Date of birth: 26 September 1970 (age 56)
- Place of birth: Libertador General San Martín, Argentina
- Position: Midfielder

Senior career*
Years	Team	Apps	(Gls)
1986–1990	Atlético Ledesma		
1993–1994	Talleres Córdoba		
1995–1996	Guabirá		
1997	The Strongest		
1998–1999	Oriente Petrolero		
2000–2001	Guabirá		
2001–2002	The Strongest		
2003	Guabirá		
2004–2005	Wilstermann		

International career^{‡}
1996–2001	Bolivia	34	(0)
- * Club domestic league appearances and goals as of 17 June 2016 ‡ National team caps and goals as of 17 June 2016

Sergio Rogelio Castillo Arce (born 26 September 1970 in Ledesma, Jujuy Province) is an Argentine–Bolivian retired football midfielder.

== Club career ==
In his early career Castillo played for Argentinian clubs Atlético Ledesma and Talleres de Córdoba. He later transferred to the Bolivian club Guabirá, where he spent three periods. He also played two periods for The Strongest, in addition to Oriente Petrolero and Wilstermann.

== International career ==
Castillo was also part of the Bolivia national team between 1996 and 2001, earning a total of 34 caps. He represented his country in 12 FIFA World Cup qualification matches.
