= Marcelo Robledo =

Argentine-Bolivian footballer (born 1978)

Personal information
- Full name: Juán Marcelo Robledo Pizarro
- Date of birth: 12 March 1978 (age 48)
- Place of birth: Santa Fe, Argentina
- Height: 1.85 m (6 ft 1 in)
- Position: Goalkeeper

Senior career*
Years	Team	Apps	(Gls)
2004–2005	The Strongest	27	(0)
2006–2007	Wilstermann	11	(0)
2008	Universitario de Sucre	2	(0)
2010	→ Bolívar (loan)	18	(0)
2011	Guabirá	4	(0)
2011–2012	Universitario de Sucre	25	(0)
2012–2013	Wilstermann	14	(0)
2013–2017	Universitario de Sucre	137	(0)
2018	Real Potosi	19	(0)

Managerial career
- 2019: Independiente Petrolero
- 2019: Fuerza Amarilla
- 2020–2022: Independiente Petrolero
- 2023: Macará
- 2023: Libertad FC
- 2023–2025: Independiente Petrolero
- 2025–2026: Totora Real Oruro
- * Club domestic league appearances and goals

Juan Marcelo Robledo Pizarro (born 12 March 1978 in Santa Fe, Argentina) is an Argentine-born Bolivian football manager and former player who played as a goalkeeper.
