= Daniel Farrar =

American soccer coach

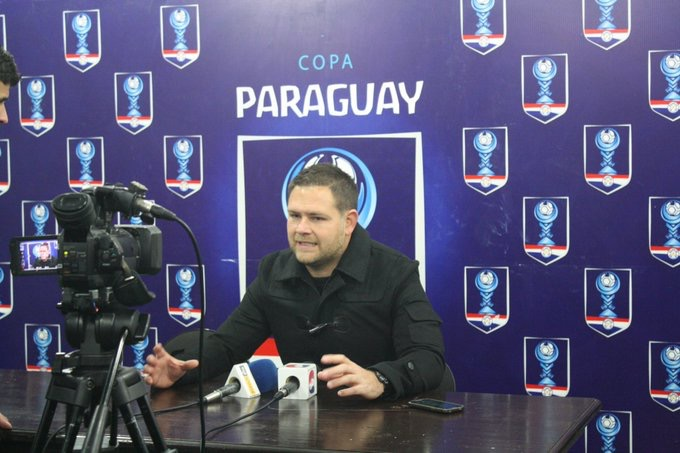

Personal information
- Date of birth: November 8, 1985 (age 40)
- Place of birth: Los Angeles, California, U.S.
- Height: 6 ft 1 in (1.85 m)

Managerial career
- Years: Team
- 2015: Olimpia (youth)
- 2016: Sportivo Luqueño (youth)
- 2016: River Plate Asunción
- 2016: Sol de América
- 2017: Sportivo Trinidense
- 2017: Deportivo Liberación
- 2018–2019: River Plate Asunción
- 2019–2020: 12 de Octubre
- 2021: Yaracuyanos
- 2022: Real Santa Cruz
- 2022: Deportivo Santaní
- 2022: Independiente FBC
- 2023: Sportivo Luqueño (reserves)
- 2023: 24 de Setiembre
- 2024: Resistencia
- 2025: Aurora
- 2026: Boluspor

Daniel Farrar (born November 8, 1985) is an American soccer coach.

After being raised in Paraguay, Farrar took up managing and worked at FC Barcelona's school in Florida before starting his career managing in Paraguay, Venezuela and Bolivia.

== Career ==
Born in Los Angeles, California to a Uruguayan father and a Bolivian mother, Farrar was raised in Paraguay, where he never played professionally. After switching to a managerial role, he returned to the US and worked at FC Barcelona's school in Fort Lauderdale, Florida.

Back to Paraguay, Farrar managed Olimpia and Sportivo Luqueño's youth sides before being named manager of Primera División side River Plate Asunción on August 8, 2016. He left the club on October 31 to take over fellow league team Sol de América.

On March 6, 2017, Farrar was named in charge of División Intermedia side Sportivo Trinidense. He moved to fellow second division team Deportivo Liberación in the following month, and returned to River Plate in 2018, with the club now also in the second level.

Farrar led River Plate to the 2018 Intermedia title, ensuring a return to the top tier, but resigned on October 2, 2019. He was presented at 12 de Octubre late in the month, and achieved another promotion to the first division.

Farrar was sacked by 12 de Octubre on February 21, 2020. The following January 10, he moved abroad after being named in charge of Venezuelan Primera División side Yaracuyanos, but resigned on May 16.

On January 11, 2022, Farrar switched teams and countries again after taking over Bolivian side Real Santa Cruz. He was sacked on March 12, after only six matches.
