= Copa Bolivia =

- Founded: 2022
- Region: Bolivia
- Teams: 16
- Current champions: Nacional Potosí (1st title)
- Most championships: Nacional Potosí (1 title)
- Broadcaster: FútbolCanal
- 2026 Copa Bolivia

The Copa Bolivia is an official football competition organized by the Bolivian Football Federation, which is played by the 16 Bolivian Primera División teams under a group stage and a knockout tournament system for the final rounds, with the winners and runners-up being entitled to qualify for the Copa Libertadores and Copa Sudamericana, respectively.

== Background ==
Whilst a tournament with the same name was held from 2012 to 2016 to grant Regional League teams a chance to promote to the second-tier Liga Nacional B, in 2022 the Bolivian Football Federation (FBF) launched the Copa Bolivia with the involvement of both professional (División Profesional) and amateur teams from the Copa Simón Bolívar and regional leagues, granting the winner a berth into the 2023 Copa Sudamericana as well as a monetary prize of US$ 500,000. The competition featured a regional preliminary stage and a national stage in which the División Profesional would enter the competition, however, the FBF cancelled the competition prior to the start of the national stage as 28 of the 32 qualified clubs failed to comply with the requirements established by the governing body.

The following year, the FBF held a league cup tournament known as Copa de la División Profesional with the participation of the 17 teams that competed in that year's league tournament, which was won by Bolívar, and two years later it announced the relaunch of the Copa Bolivia, which was to be played concurrently with the league tournament and again with the exclusive participation of the 16 Primera División teams, granting qualification for the 2026 Copa Libertadores and 2026 Copa Sudamericana to the champions and runners-up.

== Format ==
For the 2022 edition, the competition was to be played under a knockout tournament system with two stages: a preliminary stage and a national stage. In the preliminary stage, each regional football association held a competition which qualified one team from each regional league to the national stage, in which the first division teams would enter the competition, along with six quarter-finalists of the Copa Simón Bolívar, and the losing team of the promotion/relegation play-off played in the previous season. In the national stage, the 16 División Profesional clubs would be drawn against a rival from the División Aficionados (Copa Simón Bolívar or regional league) into 16 double-legged ties in which the lower-tier team would host the first leg, with the 16 winners advancing to the round of 16. The subsequent rounds (round of 16, quarter-finals, and semi-finals) would also be played as double-legged ties, while the final would be played as a single game on neutral ground.

The 2025 tournament featured five stages: a group stage, a knockout playoff round, quarter-finals, semi-finals, and the final. In the group stage, the 16 participating teams were drawn into four groups of four and played 14 matches: two against each one of their group rivals, as well as two against their derby rival and other two against one team from each of the other groups. The four group winners advanced to the quarter-finals, whilst the teams placing in second and third place in the four groups played a play-off round over two legs to decide the other four quarter-finalists, who faced the group winners in the quarter-finals. The two semi-final winners played the final, with the champions being awarded a berth into the Copa Libertadores and the runners-up qualifying for the Copa Sudamericana.

== List of champions ==
| Ed. | Year | Champion | Score(s) | Runner-up | Venue(s) |
|---|---|---|---|---|---|
| – | 2022 | Cancelled by the FBF | | | |
| 1 | 2025 | Nacional Potosí (1) | 0–2 4–1 | Bolívar | Estadio Víctor Agustín Ugarte, Potosí; Estadio Hernando Siles, La Paz |
| 2 | 2026 | | | | |

== Titles by club ==
| Rank | Club | Titles | Runners-up | Seasons won | Seasons runner-up |
|---|---|---|---|---|---|
| 1 | Nacional Potosí | 1 | — | 2025 | — |

== See also ==
- Copa Bolivia (Ascenso)
- Aerosur Cup
- Liga de Fútbol Profesional Boliviano
- Bolivian Football Regional Leagues
