= GV San José =

Bolivian football club

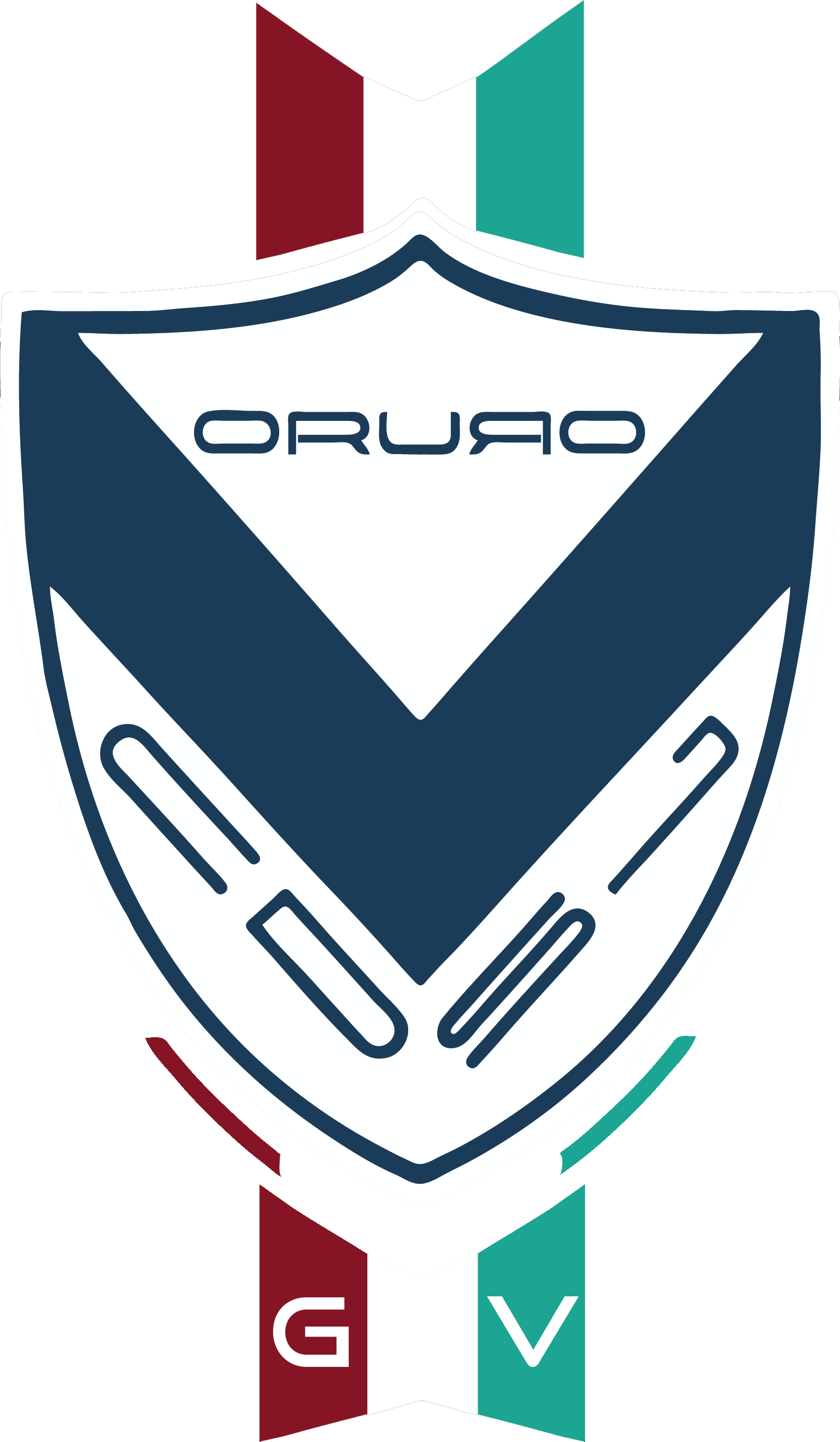
- Full name: Club Gualberto Villarroel Deportivo San José
- Founded: 16 July 1968; 58 years ago (as Club Gualberto Villarroel)
- Ground: Estadio Jesús Bermúdez; Oruro, Bolivia
- Capacity: 33,000
- Chairman: Paulo Folster
- Manager: Vacant
- League: División Profesional
- 2025: División Profesional, 9th of 16
Home colours	Away colours	Third colours

Club Gualberto Villarroel Deportivo San José is a Bolivian football club based in Sud Carangas, Oruro. Founded in 1968, they play in Primera División.

== History ==
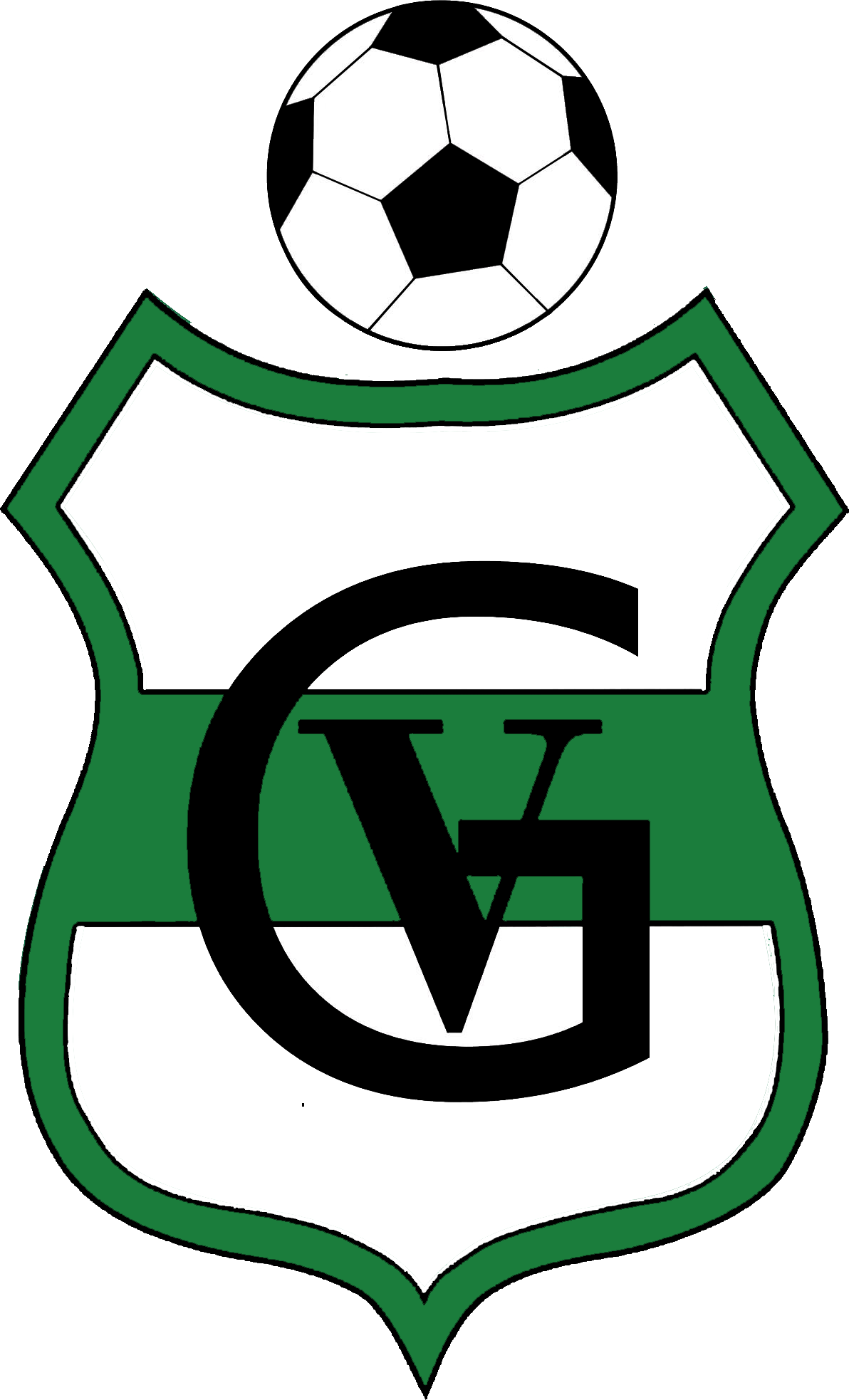
Club Gualberto Villarroel logo

Founded on 16 July 1968 as Club Gualberto Villarroel as an honour to Bolivia's 39th president Gualberto Villarroel, the club first reached the Primera A of the Oruro Football Association in 2015. In 2021, the club did not participate in any tournament due to financial problems.

In January 2022, following the relegation of San José, the club was sold to José Sánchez Aguilar, and started a new project under the name of Gualberto Villarroel San José. Despite incorporating the name of the traditional club, it was not a merger between both sides.

After adopting the colours, uniform and symbol similar to the original San José, the club announced José Peña as manager and Paulo Folster as president in February 2022. They played their first match after the change in April 2022, with several supporters from San José protesting on the stands.

After missing out a place in the Copa Simón Bolívar in 2022, the club qualified to the tournament in the 2023 season. In that competition, they reached the finals, facing San Antonio Bulo Bulo and winning the title on penalties.

== Players ==
=== First-team squad ===
As of 17 July 2026

Note: Flags indicate national team as defined under FIFA eligibility rules; some limited exceptions apply. Players may hold more than one non-FIFA nationality.

No.	Pos.	Nation	Player
1	GK	BOL	David Akologo
2	DF	BOL	Jhoni Ramallo
3	DF	BOL	Miguel Paredes
4	DF	BOL	Gonzalo Vaca
5	MF	VEN	Mijaíl Avilés
6	MF	BOL	Luis Serrano
7	FW	PAR	Alex Cáceres
8	MF	BOL	Rodrigo Orihuela
9	FW	BOL	Ronaldo Monteiro
—	FW	BOL	Roler Ferrufino
11	FW	ARG	Thomas Monterubianessi
13	GK	BOL	Germán Arauz
14	FW	BOL	Moisés Calero
15	MF	BOL	Sergio Villamíl
16	DF	BOL	Edwin Tumiri

No.	Pos.	Nation	Player
17	FW	BOL	David Ribera
18	FW	BOL	Santiago Pinto
19	DF	BOL	Sebastian Villarroel
20	DF	BOL	Fernando Aguilar
22	MF	PAR	Walter Araujo
—	DF	COL	Luis Caicedo
25	GK	BOL	Roberto Rivas
26	DF	ARG	Joaquín Lencinas
29	FW	BOL	Sebastián Galindo
30	MF	BOL	Pablo Luján
33	DF	BOL	Andrés Landa
55	FW	ARG	Juan Ignacio Goyeneche
77	MF	BOL	Fabricio Vasquez
99	FW	BOL	Jhojan Vargas

== Manager history ==
- (Bolivia) Nemesio Terrazas (2009–15)
- (Bolivia) Gerardo Parrado (2016)
- (Bolivia) Valentín Zanca (2016)
- (Bolivia) Manuel Luizaga (2016–17)
- (Bolivia) Valentín Zanca (2017)
- (Bolivia) Rubén Martínez (2017)
- (Bolivia) Edgar Mamani (2018)
- (Bolivia) Alex Terrazas (2019)
- (Brazil) João Paulo Barros (2022)
- (Argentina) Dionisio Gutiérrez (2023)
- (Bolivia) Eduardo Villegas (2023–2024)
- (Argentina) Rolando Carlen (2024)
- (Bolivia) Julio César Baldivieso (2024)
