= Julio César Baldivieso =

Bolivian footballer and coach (born 1971)

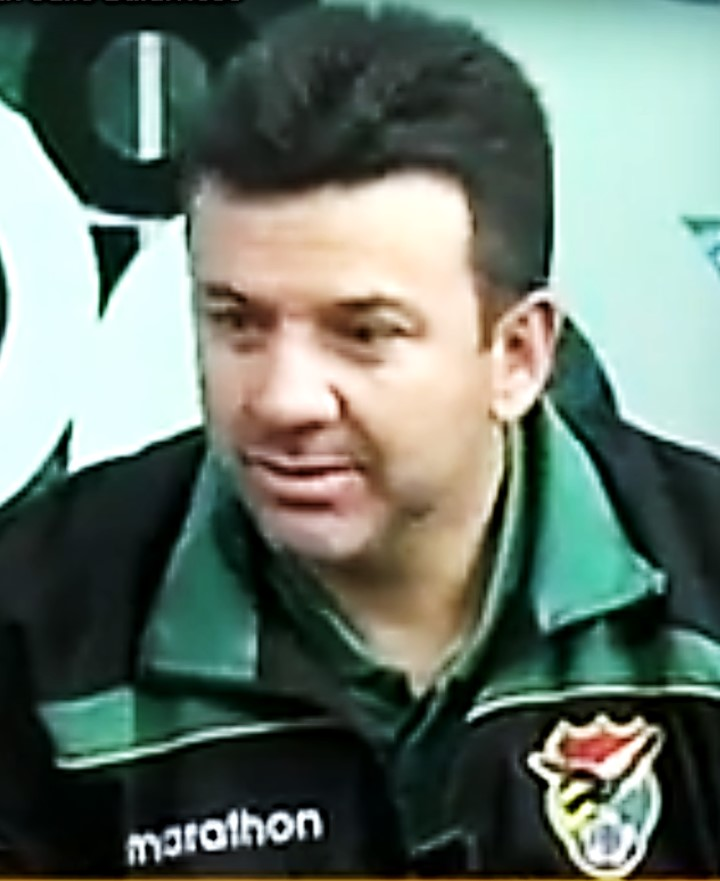
- Baldivieso in 2015

Personal information
- Full name: Julio César Baldivieso Rico
- Date of birth: 2 December 1971 (age 54)
- Place of birth: Cochabamba, Bolivia
- Height: 1.80 m (5 ft 11 in)
- Position: Attacking midfielder

Team information
- Current team: Aurora (technical director)

Senior career*
Years	Team	Apps	(Gls)
1987–1991	Wilstermann		
1992–1994	Bolívar	18+	(8+)
1994–1997	Newell's Old Boys	23	(5)
1996	→ Bolívar (loan)		
1997–1998	Yokohama Marinos	54	(19)
1999	Wilstermann		
1999	Barcelona SC	17	(4)
2000	Bolívar	14	(8)
2001	Cobreloa	12	(3)
2001–2002	Al-Nassr		
2002	Aurora	9	(3)
2002–2003	Al-Nassr		
2003	Aurora	9	(3)
2003–2004	Al-Wakra		
2004	Caracas	6	(1)
2005	Deportivo Quevedo	10	(2)
2006	The Strongest	6	(2)
2007–2008	Aurora	11	(0)

International career
1991–2005	Bolivia	85	(15)

Managerial career
- 2008–2009: Aurora
- 2011: Aurora
- 2012: Real Potosí
- 2012: Aurora
- 2013: Nacional Potosí
- 2013–2014: San José
- 2014: Wilstermann
- 2015: Universitario de Sucre
- 2015–2016: Bolivia
- 2017: Carabobo
- 2017–2018: Palestine
- 2019: Always Ready
- 2019: Aurora (assistant)
- 2020: Aurora
- 2021: Atlético Palmaflor
- 2022: Royal Pari
- 2022: Always Ready
- 2024: GV San José
- 2025: San Antonio Bulo Bulo
- 2025–2026: Always Ready
- 2026: GV San José
- * Club domestic league appearances and goals

Julio César Baldivieso Rico (born 2 December 1971) is a Bolivian football coach and former player who played as an attacking midfielder. He is the current technical director of Aurora.

Baldivieso played for the Bolivia national team at the 1994 World Cup and in several Copa Américas.

== Club career ==
Nicknamed "El Emperador", Baldivieso began his career in his native Cochabamba playing for Wilstermann in 1987. After the World Cup, he transferred to Argentine team Newell's Old Boys from Rosario, where he played until the winter of 97. Subsequently, he joined J1 League club Yokohama Marinos for a couple of years. Towards the end of his career he returned to Bolivia and played for The Strongest, and later made his final run with Aurora on and off the field as he also managed the team.

Throughout his career, Baldivieso also played in 46 Copa Libertadores games altogether for three different teams and scored 11 goals.

== International career ==
Baldivieso made his debut for Bolivia on 14 June 1991 in a friendly match, losing 1–0 against Paraguay in Santa Cruz de la Sierra. He obtained a total number of 85 caps during his career, scoring fifteen goals. He played his last international match on 12 October 2005: a World Cup Qualifier against Peru in Tacna.

== Managerial career ==
During his last season as a player Baldivieso transitioned into coaching as he took over the manager position at the club. In November 2008 he won the Clausura tournament with Aurora in a very disputed three-game final series against Blooming. On 19 July 2009, still being Aurora's manager, he made debut his own 12-year-old son, called Mauricio Baldivieso. At the end of the match he strongly criticized the referee and one opponent who made his son cry after a hard tackle. He quit Aurora five days later, after the club's board told him to pick between his job and his son. He also withdrew his son from the team. On 20 May 2011, Baldivieso returned to Aurora for his second spell. Later in his career he also managed Real Potosí, Nacional Potosí, San José, Wilstermann and Universitario de Sucre. On 28 August 2015, Baldivieso was officially presented as the manager for the Bolivia national team.

In late 2017, he became the first Bolivian to coach a foreign national football team from outside the Americas, when he was appointed as coach of Palestine. He was released in April 2018 due to a series of controversies related between him and Saudi officials.

On 31 January 2019, Baldivieso was appointed as the manager of Club Always Ready. On 23 September 2019, Baldi returned to Aurora as a sporting advisor because he could not appear as a coach in the official matches, after he already led Club Always Ready in the current 2019 Bolivian Primera División season and, according to the rules, a head coach cannot lead to two clubs in the same contest. He announced in December 2019, that he would leave the club because it was not the same for him to lead from the stands. However, later on the same month, it was confirmed that Francisco Argüello, who had been Baldi's assistant coach during the last 4–5 years, had taken charge of Aurora and that Baldi would continue at the club as his assistant, now where he could not lead the team officially.

== Personal life ==
His son Mauricio Baldivieso was the youngest player to have played in a professional football match. until it was broken by 10 year old Eric Godpower Marshall

== Career statistics ==
=== Club ===
Appearances and goals by club, season and competition
Club	Season	League			National cup (Note: Includes Emperor's Cup, Copa Chile, Crown Prince Cup, Emir Cup, Copa Venezuela.)		League cup (Note: Includes J.League Cup, Sheikh Jassem Cup.)		Total	
Club	Season	Division	Apps	Goals	Apps	Goals	Apps	Goals	Apps	Goals
Newell's Old Boys	1994-95	Argentine Primera División	12	4					12	4
Newell's Old Boys	1995-96	Argentine Primera División	11	1					11	1
Newell's Old Boys	Total		23	5					23	5
Bolívar (loan)	1996	Liga Profesional								
Yokohama Marinos	1997	J1 League	22	9	2	0	5	1	29	10
Yokohama Marinos	1998	J1 League	32	10	1	0	3	1	36	11
Yokohama Marinos	Total		54	19	3	0	8	2	65	21
Jorge Wilstermann	1999	Liga Profesional								
Barcelona SC	1999	Ecuadorian Serie A	17	4					17	4
Bolívar	2000	Liga Profesional	14	8					14	8
Cobreloa	2001	Chilean Primera División	12	3					12	3
Al-Nassr	2001–02	Saudi Professional League								
Al-Nassr	2002–03	Saudi Professional League								
Al-Nassr	Total									
Aurora	2003	Liga Profesional	9	3					9	3
Al-Wakrah	2003–04	Qatar Stars League								
Aurora	2004	Liga Profesional	7	0					7	0
Caracas	2004–05	Venezuelan Primera División								
Caracas	2005–06	Venezuelan Primera División								
Caracas	Total									
The Strongest	2006	Liga Profesional	6	2					6	2
Bolívar	2007	Liga Profesional	1	0					1	0
Aurora	2008	Liga Profesional	11	0					11	0
Career total			154	44	3	0	8	2	165	46

=== International ===
Appearances and goals by national team and year
National team	Year	Apps	Goals
Bolivia	1991	5	0
Bolivia	1992	0	0
Bolivia	1993	15	0
Bolivia	1994	14	1
Bolivia	1995	8	1
Bolivia	1996	12	3
Bolivia	1997	9	2
Bolivia	1998	0	0
Bolivia	1999	0	0
Bolivia	2000	7	2
Bolivia	2001	8	5
Bolivia	2002	0	0
Bolivia	2003	3	1
Bolivia	2004	2	0
Bolivia	2005	2	0
Total		85	15

Scores and results list Bolivia's goal tally first, score column indicates score after each Baldivieso goal.

List of international goals scored by Julio César Baldivieso
No.	Date	Venue	Opponent	Score	Result	Competition
1	26 March 1994	Dallas, United States	United States	1–0	2–2	Friendly
2	18 June 1995	Valera, Venezuela	Venezuela	3–1	3–1	Friendly
3	11 February 1996	Lima, Peru	Peru	?–?	3–1	Friendly
4	24 April 1996	Buenos Aires, Argentina	Argentina	1–2	1–3	1998 FIFA World Cup qualification
5	7 July 1996	La Paz, Bolivia	Venezuela	3–0	6–1	1998 FIFA World Cup qualification
6	15 June 1997	La Paz, Bolivia	Peru	2–0	2–0	Copa América
7	18 June 1997	La Paz, Bolivia	Uruguay	1–0	1–0	Copa América
8	5 March 2000	La Paz, Bolivia	Haiti	3–0	9–2	Friendly
9	28 June 2000	San Cristóbal, Venezuela	Venezuela	2–2	2–4	2002 FIFA World Cup qualification
10	3 June 2001	La Paz, Bolivia	Venezuela	1–0	5–0	2002 FIFA World Cup qualification
11	3 June 2001	La Paz, Bolivia	Venezuela	5–0	5–0	2002 FIFA World Cup qualification
12	14 August 2001	Santiago, Chile	Chile	1–0	2–2	2002 FIFA World Cup qualification
13	7 November 2001	La Paz, Bolivia	Brazil	2–1	3–1	2002 FIFA World Cup qualification
14	7 November 2001	La Paz, Bolivia	Brazil	3–1	3–1	2002 FIFA World Cup qualification
15	10 September 2003	La Paz, Bolivia	Colombia	1–0	4–0	2006 FIFA World Cup qualification

== Managerial statistics ==
As of 27 March 2018

Managerial record by team and tenure
Team	From	To	Record							
Team	From	To	G	W	D	L	GF	GA	GD	Win %
Palestine	19 December 2017	22 April 2018	2	0	1	1	0	1	−1	0.00
Career totals			2	0	1	1	0	1	−1	0.00
