= CDT Real Oruro =

Bolivian football club

- Full name: Club Deportivo Totora Real Oruro
- Founded: 30 April 1962; 64 years ago
- Ground: Estadio Jesús Bermúdez; Oruro
- Capacity: 28,000
- Chairman: Richard Vásquez
- Manager: Marcelo Robledo
- League: División Profesional
- 2025: División Profesional, 13th of 16
Home colours	Away colours

Club Deportivo Totora Real Oruro, known as CDT Real Oruro, is a Bolivian professional football club from Oruro. The club was founded on 30 April 1962, and competes in División Profesional, holding home matches at the Estadio Jesús Bermúdez, with a capacity of 28,000 people.

== History ==
Founded on 30 April 1962 as Deportivo Totora, the club changed name to Club Deportivo Totora Real Oruro in February 2022, and first reached the Copa Simón Bolívar of that year, after finishing third in the Oruro Primera A. In the following year's Adecuación tournament, they finished second after losing the finals to Empresa Minera Huanuni.

CDT Real Oruro won the 2023 Primera A tournament, after defeating Sur-Car 4–1 in the final. In the 2024 Copa Simón Bolívar, the club reached the finals of the competition, after knocking out Universitario de Sucre in the semifinals, but lost the title to ABB by 3–2 on aggregate.

== Managers ==
- (Argentina) Domingo Sánchez (2022–23)
- (Bolivia) Jhonny Serrudo (2023)
- (Bolivia) Denys Heredia (2024)
- (Argentina) Daniel Gómez (2024)
- (Bolivia) Alberto Illanes (2025)
