= Club Deportivo Guabirá =

Bolivian football club

Guabirá
- Full name: Club Social y Deportivo Guabirá
- Nicknames: Azucarero; Diablos Rojos; El Rojo; La Furia Roja; Los de la Caldera del Diablo
- Founded: April 14, 1962; 64 years ago
- Ground: Estadio Gilberto Parada; Montero, Bolivia
- Capacity: 13,000
- Chairman: Rafael Paz
- Manager: Joaquín Monasterio
- League: División Profesional
- 2025: División Profesional, 8th of 16
- Website: clubguabiraoficial.com
Home colours	Away colours	Third colours

Club Deportivo Guabirá is a Bolivian professional football club from Montero, Santa Cruz, that currently plays in the Bolivian Primera División. Their home ground is the Estadio Gilberto Parada, which has a capacity of 13,000 spectators.

Although the team has always been based in Montero, they played in Santa Cruz de la Sierra until 1999 when their stadium was finally brought up to first division standards.

== History ==
The club was formed on 14 April 1962. Guabirá won its first trophy with the 1975 league title. The championship also gave the club a spot in their first continental participation: the 1976 Copa Libertadores, where it finished last in its group. The next year, in 1977, the club was one of the 16 clubs that founded the Bolivian professional league. In 1995 the club finished runner-up, which granted it a spot in the 1996 Copa Libertadores. The club finished last in the group again, although it got a victory over fellow Bolivian side Club San José.

The club almost won the Copa Bolivia in 2000, but lost to The Strongest in the final.

The club earned its first Copa Sudamericana participation and made the return to continental tournaments after 22 years with its participation in the 2018 Copa Sudamericana, where the club was eliminated in the first round on away goals to LDU Quito. They earned this right because they finished 6th in the aggregate table for the 2016–17 season. Guabirá participated again in the 2019 and 2021 editions. In 2019 they were eliminated in the first round to an Ecuadorian team again, this time to Macará, while in 2021 they defeated fellow Bolivian side Nacional Potosí to advance to the group stage, in which they lost all of their matches.

== Honours ==
=== National ===
- Bolivian Primera División
  - Winners (1): 1975
- Bolivian Second Division
  - Winners (2): 2007, 2009

=== Regional ===
- Campeonato Cruceño
  - Winners (6): 1985, 1986, 1992, 2005, 2009, 2014-15

== Performance in CONMEBOL competitions ==
- Copa Libertadores: 2 appearances

Best: First Round in 1976, 1996
1976 – first round
1996 – first round

- Copa Sudamericana: 3 appearances

Best: Group Stage in 2021
2018 – first stage
2019 – first stage
2021 – group stage

== Current squad ==
As of 14 March, 2026

Note: Flags indicate national team as defined under FIFA eligibility rules; some limited exceptions apply. Players may hold more than one non-FIFA nationality.

No.	Pos.	Nation	Player
1	GK	BOL	Manuel Ferrel
2	DF	ARG	Joaquín Barro
5	MF	URU	Ramiro Cristóbal
6	MF	BOL	Carlos Añez
7	MF	BOL	Gustavo Peredo
8	DF	BOL	Andrés Moreno
9	FW	BOL	Roler Ferrufino
11	FW	BOL	Samuel Garzón
13	GK	BOL	Jorge Araúz
14	MF	BOL	Juan Parada
15	MF	BOL	Rafinha
17	MF	PAR	Milton Maciel
19	DF	BOL	Jorge Flores

No.	Pos.	Nation	Player
21	DF	PAR	Milciades Portillo
24	DF	PAR	David Robles
25	GK	BOL	Roger Coronado
27	DF	BOL	Rafael Corrales
29	MF	ARG	Nicolas Masskooni
30	MF	BOL	Asiel Paredes
32	GK	ARG	Gastón Gómez
33	FW	BOL	Denilso Fernandez
35	FW	BOL	Dener Da Silva
37	MF	BOL	Thiago Chávez
40	MF	BOL	Marco Pinto
77	MF	BRA	Thiago Ribeiro
97	DF	BOL	Sergio Gil
99	FW	BRA	Pedro
