= 2023 FBF División Profesional =

División Profesional
- Season: 2023
- Dates: 4 February – 6 December 2023
- Champions: The Strongest (16th title)
- Relegated: Libertad Gran Mamoré; Vaca Díez; Palmaflor del Trópico
- Copa Libertadores: The Strongest; Bolívar; Always Ready; Aurora
- Copa Sudamericana: Jorge Wilstermann (via Copa División Profesional); Nacional Potosí; Real Tomayapo; Universitario de Vinto
- Matches: 272
- Goals: 751 (2.76 per match)
- Top goalscorer: Dorny Romero (25 goals)
- Biggest home win: The Strongest 8–0 Libertad Gran Mamoré (10 November)
- Biggest away win: Palmaflor 1–7 Bolívar (25 November)
- Highest scoring: Nacional Potosí 6–3 The Strongest (24 June)

The 2023 FBF División Profesional, known as the 2023 Liga Tigo for sponsorship reasons, was the 46th season of the División Profesional del Fútbol Boliviano, Bolivia's top-flight football league and the sixth season under División de Fútbol Profesional management. The season started on 4 February and ended on 6 December 2023.

The competition was suspended at a meeting of the División Profesional's Council on 5 September 2023, along with the 2023 Copa de la División Profesional, after the Bolivian Football Federation president Fernando Costa denounced suspicions of match-fixing, bribery, illegal betting and alterations to VAR. However, the suspension was lifted per suggestion from Costa on 27 September after reforms to the referee commission were performed and an agreement with CONMEBOL for monitoring was reached, as well as to allow the FBF's Sports Disciplinary Court to finish the investigations on the matter.

The Strongest were the champions, clinching their sixteenth league title with two games in hand and a 1–1 draw against Always Ready on 26 November 2023. Bolívar were the defending champions.

== Format ==
On 11 November 2022, the Bolivian Football Federation announced that the 2023 season of the División Profesional would have 17 teams, as the division's Higher Council decided that no club would be directly relegated to the Bolivian Football Regional Leagues. With this, the 2022 Copa Simón Bolívar earned a direct spot in the top tier, while the runners-up played a promotion/relegation play-off against the last-placed team in the aggregate table, Universitario de Sucre.

The format for the season was confirmed after a meeting of the División Profesional's Council held on 13 January 2023. Teams played two parallel tournaments in the season: a double round-robin league tournament which was played on weekends and crowned the season's only champion and a league cup tournament which was played on weekdays with a group stage and an eight-team knockout stage. The champions of both tournaments qualified for the 2024 Copa Libertadores, whilst the league cup runners-up qualified for the 2024 Copa Sudamericana. The remaining international berths as well as relegation were decided by an aggregate table which considered the performance of teams in both the league tournament and the group stage of the División Profesional cup. The two teams with the lowest average at the end of the season were directly relegated to the regional leagues, while the team with the next lowest average played a relegation play-off series, this in order to return to 16 teams in the league for the following season.

== Teams ==
17 teams competed in the league for the 2023 season, 15 of which took part in 2022. Vaca Díez took part in the top flight for the first time ever, ensuring their promotion on 24 November 2022 after winning the 2022 Copa Simón Bolívar, whilst Libertad Gran Mamoré were also promoted after winning the promotion/relegation play-off against Universitario de Sucre, who were relegated after one season in the top flight.

=== Stadia and locations ===
Locations of the 2023 División Profesional teams.

Team	City	Stadium	Capacity
Always Ready	El Alto	Municipal de Villa Ingenio	25,000
Aurora	Cochabamba	Félix Capriles	32,000
Blooming	Santa Cruz de la Sierra	Ramón Tahuichi Aguilera	38,000
Bolívar	La Paz	Hernando Siles	42,000
Guabirá	Montero	Gilberto Parada	13,000
Independiente Petrolero	Sucre	Olímpico Patria	30,700
Jorge Wilstermann	Cochabamba	Félix Capriles	32,000
Libertad Gran Mamoré	Trinidad	Gran Mamoré	12,000
Nacional Potosí	Potosí	Víctor Agustín Ugarte	32,105
Oriente Petrolero	Santa Cruz de la Sierra	Ramón Tahuichi Aguilera	38,000
Palmaflor del Trópico	Villa Tunari	Bicentenario	25,000
Real Santa Cruz	Santa Cruz de la Sierra	Real Santa Cruz	14,000
Real Tomayapo	Tarija	IV Centenario	15,000
Royal Pari	Santa Cruz de la Sierra	Ramón Tahuichi Aguilera	38,000
The Strongest	La Paz	Hernando Siles	42,000
Universitario de Vinto	Cochabamba	Félix Capriles (Note: Used along with Estadio Municipal de Quillacollo as home stadiums for the season since Universitario's stadium Estadio Hipólito Lazarte does not meet FBF requirements for a professional match.)	32,000
Vaca Díez	Cobija	Roberto Jordán Cuéllar	24,000

=== Personnel and kits ===
Team	Manager	Kit manufacturer	Shirt sponsor
Always Ready	(Bolivia) Óscar Villegas (caretaker)	Marathon	UTB, Suzuki
Aurora	(Bolivia) Mauricio Soria	Marathon	Tigo
Blooming	(Argentina) Carlos Bustos	Marathon	Kia
Bolívar	(Bolivia) Vladimir Soria (Bolivia) Wálter Flores (caretakers)	Puma	Suzuki
Guabirá	(Bolivia) Humberto Viviani	Forte	Celina, Ingenio Guabirá, Grupo Paz
Independiente Petrolero	(Argentina) Marcelo Robledo	Forte	Tigo, Fancesa, UTB
Jorge Wilstermann	(Argentina) Christian Díaz	Forte	Campero, BC Towers, BoA
Libertad Gran Mamoré	(Argentina) Marcelo Straccia	Parabero Sport	Aqua Level, UTB, Coca-Cola
Nacional Potosí	(Argentina) Flavio Robatto	Forte	BCP
Oriente Petrolero	(Chile) Rodrigo Venegas	Marathon	Chevrolet
Palmaflor del Trópico	(Argentina) Joaquín Pérez	Forte	Maxus, Centro Comercial Privado Av. G77
Real Santa Cruz	(Argentina) Miguel Ángel Zahzú	Arce	GAC Motor
Real Tomayapo	(Argentina) Martín Brignani	LEA	Altavida
Royal Pari	(Mexico) David de la Torre	Marathon	Grupo SION
The Strongest	(Bolivia) Pablo Cabanillas	Marathon	
Universitario de Vinto	(Paraguay) Pablo Godoy	Oxígeno Wear	Lucana, UTB
Vaca Díez	(Brazil) Rodrigo Santana	IAN	Raulino y Nolvia

=== Managerial changes ===
Team	Outgoing manager	Manner of departure	Date of vacancy	Position in table	Incoming manager	Date of appointment
Palmaflor del Trópico	Vacant (Note: The club sacked Humberto Viviani on 22 October 2022, but since no matches were played after that, no caretaker manager was appointed.)	—N/a	—N/a	Pre-season	(Argentina) Daniel Brizuela	5 December 2022
Bolívar	(Brazil) Antônio Carlos Zago	End of contract	12 November 2022	Pre-season	(Spain) Beñat San José	12 November 2022
Nacional Potosí	(Argentina) Flavio Robatto	Mutual agreement	13 November 2022	Pre-season	(Argentina) Víctor Hugo Andrada	17 November 2022
The Strongest	(Argentina) Claudio Biaggio	End of contract	18 November 2022	Pre-season	(Spain) Ismael Rescalvo	8 December 2022
Blooming	(Bolivia) Víctor Hugo Antelo	Mutual agreement	20 November 2022	Pre-season	(Brazil) Thiago Leitão	16 December 2022
Real Santa Cruz	(Argentina) Andrés Marinangeli	Mutual agreement	21 November 2022	Pre-season	(Argentina) Claudio Rodríguez and (Argentina) Miguel Abrigo	3 January 2023
Independiente Petrolero	(Chile) Rodrigo Venegas	End of contract	22 November 2022	Pre-season	(Bolivia) Juan Pablo Grass	22 November 2022
Vaca Díez	(Bolivia) Carlos Hurtado	Resigned	25 November 2022	Pre-season	(Spain) José Aurelio Gay	24 December 2022
Universitario de Vinto	(Paraguay) Pablo Godoy	Resigned	27 December 2022	Pre-season	(Bolivia) Alberto Illanes	5 January 2023
Always Ready	(Bolivia) Óscar Villegas	End of caretaker spell	28 December 2022	Pre-season	(Paraguay) Pablo Godoy	28 December 2022
Jorge Wilstermann	(Bolivia) Alberto Illanes	Resigned	31 December 2022	Pre-season	(Argentina) Christian Díaz (Note: The club announced Andrés Marinangeli as manager on 5 January, but after a change of board, Marinangeli was dismissed on 23 January.)	23 January 2023
Independiente Petrolero	(Bolivia) Juan Pablo Grass	Sacked	16 February 2023	16th	(Bolivia) Álvaro Peña	16 February 2023
Libertad Gran Mamoré	(Bolivia) Cristian Reynaldo	Sacked	16 February 2023	11th	(Argentina) Andrés Marinangeli	17 February 2023
Blooming	(Brazil) Thiago Leitão	Sacked	18 February 2023	13th	(Argentina) Carlos Bustos	19 February 2023
Always Ready	(Paraguay) Pablo Godoy	Sacked	6 March 2023	9th	(Argentina) Claudio Biaggio	10 March 2023
Libertad Gran Mamoré	(Argentina) Andrés Marinangeli	Sacked	13 March 2023	13th	(Bolivia) José Peña	13 March 2023
Nacional Potosí	(Argentina) Víctor Hugo Andrada	Sacked	13 March 2023	5th	(Argentina) Flavio Robatto	14 March 2023
Real Tomayapo	(Bolivia) Richard Rojas	Sacked	14 March 2023	14th	(Argentina) Juan Vita	15 March 2023
Royal Pari	(Bolivia) Luis Marín Camacho	End of caretaker spell	15 March 2023	10th	(Peru) Roberto Mosquera	15 March 2023
Oriente Petrolero	(Bolivia) Erwin Sánchez	Resigned	15 April 2023	7th	(Bolivia) Leonardo Eguez (Note: Caretaker manager.) (Note: Roly Paniagua was the caretaker manager for the 2023 Copa Sudamericana group stage matchday 2.)	20 April 2023
Guabirá	(Bolivia) Mauricio Soria	Mutual agreement	17 April 2023	14th	(Spain) Miguel Ángel Portugal (Note: Gualberto Mojica was the caretaker manager for the 10th round match against Aurora.)	21 April 2023
Vaca Díez	(Spain) José Aurelio Gay	Resigned	1 May 2023	13th	(Spain) Marcos Pastor	2 May 2023
Oriente Petrolero	(Bolivia) Leonardo Eguez	End of caretaker spell	7 May 2023	10th	(Argentina) Ángel Guillermo Hoyos	4 May 2023
Always Ready	(Argentina) Claudio Biaggio	Mutual agreement	4 May 2023	6th	(Bolivia) Óscar Villegas (Note: Originally as caretaker manager, appointed on a permanent basis on 8 May 2023.)	5 May 2023
Vaca Díez	(Spain) Marcos Pastor	End of caretaker spell	6 May 2023	14th	(Spain) Carlos Fonseca	6 May 2023
Palmaflor del Trópico	(Argentina) Daniel Brizuela	Resigned	7 May 2023	6th	(Argentina) Joaquín Pérez (Note: Originally as caretaker manager, later appointed on a permanent basis.)	8 May 2023
The Strongest	(Spain) Ismael Rescalvo	Resigned	8 May 2023	1st	(Argentina) Claudio Biaggio	8 May 2023
Royal Pari	(Peru) Roberto Mosquera	Mutual agreement	22 May 2023	13th	(Mexico) David de la Torre (Note: Originally as caretaker manager, appointed on a permanent basis on 9 June 2023.)	23 May 2023
Guabirá	(Spain) Miguel Ángel Portugal	Mutual agreement	22 May 2023	10th	(Bolivia) Gualberto Mojica	23 May 2023
Guabirá	(Bolivia) Gualberto Mojica	End of caretaker spell	1 June 2023	13th	(Spain) José Aurelio Gay (Note: Gustavo Notta was the caretaker manager for the 16th round match against Universitario de Vinto.)	1 June 2023
The Strongest	(Argentina) Claudio Biaggio	Mutual agreement	12 June 2023	1st	(Portugal) Ricardo Formosinho	17 June 2023
Real Tomayapo	(Argentina) Juan Vita	Resigned	22 June 2023	9th	(Argentina) Pablo Rubinich	22 June 2023
Real Tomayapo	(Argentina) Pablo Rubinich	End of caretaker spell	24 June 2023	8th	(Spain) David González	24 June 2023
Universitario de Vinto	(Bolivia) Alberto Illanes	Sacked	13 July 2023	10th	(Paraguay) Pablo Godoy	14 July 2023
Oriente Petrolero	(Argentina) Ángel Guillermo Hoyos	Resigned	18 July 2023	13th	(Spain) Antonio Puche	19 July 2023
Libertad Gran Mamoré	(Bolivia) José Peña	Sacked	20 July 2023	17th	(Bolivia) Humberto Viviani	20 July 2023
Vaca Díez	(Spain) Carlos Fonseca	Sacked	21 July 2023	15th	(Brazil) Rodrigo Santana	27 July 2023
The Strongest	(Portugal) Ricardo Formosinho	Resigned	10 August 2023	1st	(Bolivia) Pablo Cabanillas (Note: Originally as caretaker manager, appointed on a permanent basis on 14 August 2023.)	11 August 2023
Guabirá	(Spain) José Aurelio Gay	Mutual agreement	14 August 2023	16th	(Argentina) Andrés Marinangeli	15 August 2023
Real Santa Cruz	(Argentina) Claudio Rodríguez and (Argentina) Miguel Abrigo	Resigned	21 August 2023	6th	(Argentina) Miguel Ángel Zahzú	23 August 2023
Independiente Petrolero	(Bolivia) Álvaro Peña	Resigned	21 August 2023	7th	(Argentina) Marcelo Robledo	23 August 2023
Always Ready	(Bolivia) Óscar Villegas	Demoted to the reserve squad	30 August 2023	4th	(Chile) Rodrigo Venegas	30 August 2023
Real Tomayapo	(Spain) David González	Resigned	29 September 2023	10th	(Argentina) Pablo Rubinich	1 October 2023
Real Tomayapo	(Argentina) Pablo Rubinich	End of caretaker spell	11 October 2023	7th	(Argentina) Martín Brignani	11 October 2023
Always Ready	(Chile) Rodrigo Venegas	Mutual agreement	30 October 2023	4th	(Bolivia) Óscar Villegas (Note: Caretaker manager until the end of the season.)	30 October 2023
Libertad Gran Mamoré	(Bolivia) Humberto Viviani	Resigned	6 November 2023	16th	(Argentina) Marcelo Straccia (Note: Danny Callaú was the caretaker manager for the 30th round match against The Strongest.)	9 November 2023
Oriente Petrolero	(Spain) Antonio Puche	Sacked	6 November 2023	10th	(Chile) Rodrigo Venegas	8 November 2023
Guabirá	(Argentina) Andrés Marinangeli	Sacked	8 November 2023	15th	(Bolivia) Humberto Viviani (Note: Gustavo Notta was the caretaker manager for the 30th round match against Always Ready.)	8 November 2023
Aurora	(Paraguay) Roberto Pérez	Sacked	14 November 2023	5th	(Bolivia) Mauricio Soria	15 November 2023
Bolívar	(Spain) Beñat San José	Resigned	19 November 2023	2nd	(Bolivia) Vladimir Soria and (Bolivia) Wálter Flores	19 November 2023

== Standings ==
Pos	Team	Pld	W	D	L	GF	GA	GD	Pts	Qualification or relegation
1	The Strongest (C)	32	19	8	5	65	34	+31	65	Qualification for Copa Libertadores group stage
2	Bolívar	32	17	6	9	84	42	+42	57	
3	Always Ready	32	16	9	7	54	36	+18	57	
4	Nacional Potosí	32	16	6	10	72	46	+26	54	
5	Aurora	32	14	9	9	45	31	+14	51	
6	Real Tomayapo	32	13	10	9	36	34	+2	49	
7	Real Santa Cruz	32	13	7	12	31	42	−11	46	
8	Jorge Wilstermann (Note: Jorge Wilstermann were deducted six points as punishment for failing to pay outstanding debts with former players.)	32	12	13	7	39	27	+12	43	
9	Oriente Petrolero	32	11	10	11	44	42	+2	43	
10	Universitario de Vinto	32	9	14	9	30	28	+2	41	
11	Independiente Petrolero	32	13	1	18	33	45	−12	40	
12	Royal Pari	32	8	11	13	40	53	−13	35	
13	Guabirá	32	10	5	17	34	49	−15	35	
14	Blooming	32	9	6	17	37	56	−19	33	
15	Libertad Gran Mamoré	32	9	6	17	32	65	−33	33	
16	Vaca Díez	32	8	8	16	42	61	−19	32	
17	Palmaflor del Trópico	32	8	5	19	32	59	−27	29	

Source: FBF, Soccerway
Rules for classification: 1) Points, 2) Goal difference, 3) Goals for, 4) Away goals for, 5) Yellow cards, 6) Red cards, 7) Drawing of lots.
(C) Champions

== Results ==
Home \ Away	CAR	AUR	BLO	BOL	GUA	IPE	WIL	LGM	NAC	ORI	PAL	RSC	RTO	RPA	STR	UVI	VAC
Always Ready	—	3–1	2–0	2–2	3–0	3–2	2–2	5–0	3–3	4–1	2–0	2–0	1–1	3–0	2–0	1–2	1–0
Aurora	0–0	—	3–1	2–1	1–0	2–0	1–0	5–0	2–0	2–2	2–1	1–1	1–2	3–0	0–3	0–1	3–0
Blooming	2–1	2–1	—	0–5	3–1	1–0	1–1	0–1	1–0	2–1	1–1	1–3	2–2	1–1	1–3	3–4	3–1
Bolívar	5–0	1–0	6–1	—	3–1	5–1	1–3	3–0	4–3	4–0	5–1	3–0	4–1	3–1	3–0	1–1	3–0
Guabirá	0–0	1–0	2–1	1–2	—	2–0	1–1	2–2	6–1	2–3	1–0	1–2	1–0	3–2	4–1	1–0	2–2
Independiente Petrolero	1–2	1–1	2–0	2–1	1–0	—	0–3	4–0	0–1	2–0	1–0	1–0	0–3	4–2	1–4	0–2	0–1
Jorge Wilstermann	3–0	0–2	1–0	3–1	1–0	0–1	—	1–0	0–0	3–2	4–0	1–0	3–0	0–0	1–1	0–0	2–2
Libertad Gran Mamoré	1–2	0–1	2–1	2–0	0–1	0–1	1–1	—	3–2	3–1	2–1	1–0	1–1	0–2	1–0	0–0	3–2
Nacional Potosí	0–2	0–0	3–0	3–2	6–0	2–4	2–1	5–1	—	3–1	4–1	6–0	3–1	6–1	6–3	2–1	6–1
Oriente Petrolero	2–0	1–0	1–1	1–1	1–0	2–0	3–0	1–1	3–0	—	1–2	0–1	2–0	1–2	1–1	1–1	1–0
Palmaflor del Trópico	0–2	0–1	3–2	1–7	2–0	0–1	2–0	4–1	0–1	1–2	—	1–0	0–0	2–2	0–1	1–1	2–2
Real Santa Cruz	2–1	1–1	2–1	3–1	0–0	1–0	1–1	3–2	2–0	0–5	2–1	—	1–0	1–0	1–1	0–0	2–1
Real Tomayapo	2–0	2–1	0–0	0–0	2–0	2–1	0–0	3–2	0–0	1–1	4–0	1–0	—	0–2	0–0	0–2	3–2
Royal Pari	1–2	2–2	1–2	0–0	4–1	2–1	0–0	2–0	2–2	1–1	0–3	1–1	1–2	—	0–2	1–1	2–1
The Strongest	1–1	2–2	1–0	3–2	1–0	2–0	1–0	8–0	1–0	0–0	4–0	4–0	3–1	3–2	—	2–1	4–1
Universitario de Vinto	1–1	1–1	1–0	2–2	1–0	0–1	0–1	1–1	0–0	1–1	0–1	1–0	0–1	1–2	1–3	—	2–0
Vaca Díez	1–1	2–3	0–3	4–3	3–0	1–0	2–2	2–1	0–2	3–1	3–1	2–1	0–1	1–1	2–2	0–0	—

Source: FBF, Soccerway
Legend: Blue = home team win; Yellow = draw; Red = away team win.

== Top scorers ==
Rank	Player	Club	Goals
1	(Dominican Republic) Dorny Romero	Always Ready	25
2	(Argentina) Martín Prost	Nacional Potosí	22
2	(Argentina) Enrique Triverio	The Strongest	22
4	(Colombia) Tommy Tobar	Nacional Potosí	21
5	(Chile) Ronnie Fernández	Bolívar	18
5	(Bolivia) Jair Reinoso	Aurora	18
7	(Colombia) José Erick Correa	Royal Pari	10
7	(Uruguay) Gastón Rodríguez	Blooming	10
7	(Brazil) Thomaz Santos	Independiente Petrolero	10
10	(Uruguay) Junior Arias	The Strongest	9
10	(Colombia) Diego Cuadros	Vaca Díez	9
10	(Brazil) Rafinha	Blooming	9

Source: Soccerway

== Aggregate table ==
For this season, the aggregate table considered the performance of teams in the 2023 División Profesional league tournament as well as the group stage of the 2023 Copa de la División Profesional. Given the odd number of teams in the league for the season and the uneven size of groups in the Copa de la División Profesional, this table was based on averages, dividing the sum of points in both tournaments by the total number of games played in both tournaments for each team.

Pos	Team	Pld	W	D	L	GF	GA	GD	Pts	Avg.	Qualification or relegation
1	Bolívar	42	25	6	11	108	49	+59	81	1.928571	Qualification for Copa Libertadores group stage
2	The Strongest (C)	40	22	11	7	75	40	+35	77	1.925	Qualification for Copa Libertadores group stage
3	Always Ready	42	20	12	10	74	53	+21	72	1.714286	Qualification for Copa Libertadores second stage
4	Aurora	40	17	13	10	50	35	+15	64	1.6	Qualification for Copa Libertadores first stage (Note: Since Bolívar won the 2023 Copa de la División Profesional, the Copa Libertadores first stage berth allocated to its champion was awarded to Aurora, as the aggregate table's best team not yet qualified.)
5	Nacional Potosí	42	19	9	14	92	63	+29	66	1.571429	Qualification for Copa Sudamericana first stage (Note: Jorge Wilstermann qualified for the Copa Sudamericana first stage as the 2023 Copa de la División Profesional runners-up.)
6	Real Tomayapo	42	16	13	13	44	48	−4	61	1.452381	Qualification for Copa Sudamericana first stage
7	Jorge Wilstermann (Note: Jorge Wilstermann were deducted six points as punishment for failing to pay outstanding debts with former players.)	42	17	15	10	59	38	+21	60	1.428571	Qualification for Copa Sudamericana first stage
8	Universitario de Vinto	42	13	17	12	47	45	+2	56	1.333333	Qualification for Copa Sudamericana first stage
9	Blooming	42	16	7	19	53	64	−11	55	1.309524	
10	Real Santa Cruz	40	14	10	16	35	53	−18	52	1.3	
11	Oriente Petrolero	42	12	13	17	51	61	−10	49	1.166667	
12	Guabirá	40	13	7	20	43	56	−13	46	1.15	
13	Royal Pari	42	12	12	18	54	68	−14	48	1.142857	
14	Independiente Petrolero	42	15	3	24	43	62	−19	48	1.142857	
15	Libertad Gran Mamoré (R)	42	13	7	22	42	82	−40	46	1.095238	Qualification for Promotion/relegation play-off
16	Vaca Díez (R)	42	12	8	22	56	82	−26	44	1.047619	Relegation to Bolivian Football Regional Leagues
17	Palmaflor del Trópico (R)	40	10	9	21	37	64	−27	39	0.975	Relegation to Bolivian Football Regional Leagues

Source: Paraelfutbol.com
Rules for classification: 1) Average, 2) Average goal difference, 4) Average goals for, 5) Average away goals for, 6) Average yellow cards, 7) Average red cards, 8) Drawing of lots.
(C) Champion; (R) Relegated

== Promotion/relegation play-off ==
The relegation play-off was played by:

- Libertad Gran Mamoré (2023 División Profesional aggregate table 15th place)
- San Antonio Bulo Bulo (2023 Copa Simón Bolívar runners-up)
13 December 2023
16:00 UTC−4

San Antonio Bulo Bulo	2–0	Libertad Gran Mamoré
Borda 62'; Jaldín 83'	Report

Estadio Félix Capriles, Cochabamba
Referee: Carlos Arteaga

16 December 2023
15:00 UTC−4

Libertad Gran Mamoré	2–0	San Antonio Bulo Bulo
Tomicha 90'; Taborga 90+13'	Report
Penalties
Gil (penalty scored); Bejarano (penalty missed); Taborga (penalty scored); Rodríguez (penalty missed)	2–4	(penalty scored) Preciado; (penalty scored) Sánchez; (penalty scored) Alaca; (penalty scored) Mendoza

Estadio Gran Mamoré, Trinidad
Referee: Dilio Rodríguez

Tied 2–2 on aggregate, San Antonio Bulo Bulo won on penalties and promoted to the División Profesional.

== See also ==
- 2023 Copa de la División Profesional
