= 2023 Copa de la División Profesional =

Tournament details
- Country: Bolivia
- Dates: 14 February – 18 December 2023
- Teams: 17

Final positions
- Champions: Bolívar (1st title)
- Runners-up: Jorge Wilstermann
- Copa Sudamericana: Jorge Wilstermann

Tournament statistics
- Matches played: 94
- Goals scored: 248 (2.64 per match)
- Top goal scorer: Francisco da Costa (9 goals)

The 2023 Copa de la División Profesional, known as the 2023 Copa Tigo for sponsorship purposes, was the first edition of the Copa de la División Profesional, a Bolivian league cup competition which was contested by the 17 teams that took part in the Bolivian Primera División for the 2023 season. The competition was approved at a meeting of the División Profesional's Council held on 13 January 2023. It began on 14 February and ended on 18 December 2023.

The competition was suspended at a meeting of the División Profesional's Council on 5 September 2023, along with the 2023 Primera División tournament, after the Bolivian Football Federation president Fernando Costa denounced suspicions of match-fixing, bribery, illegal betting and alterations to VAR. However, the suspension was lifted per suggestion from Costa on 27 September after reforms to the referee commission were performed and an agreement with CONMEBOL for monitoring was reached, as well as to allow the FBF's Sports Disciplinary Court to finish the investigations on the matter.

Bolívar won the competition, defeating Jorge Wilstermann in the finals by a 3–1 aggregate score.

== Format ==
The Copa de la División Profesional, which was played on weekdays and concurrently with the 2023 División Profesional tournament, featured a group stage and an 8-team knockout stage. For the group stage, the 17 teams were drawn into two groups of six teams and one group of five, in which teams played each one of their group rivals twice (once at home and once away). The top three teams of the six-team groups and the top two teams in the five-team group advanced to the knockout stage, in which teams played the quarter-finals, semi-finals, and finals over two legs.

The Copa de la División Profesional champions were entitled to qualify for the 2024 Copa Libertadores, taking the Bolivia 4 berth for that competition, while the runners-up would qualify for the 2024 Copa Sudamericana, taking the Bolivia 1 berth.

== Group stage ==
=== Group A ===
Pos	Team	Pld	W	D	L	GF	GA	GD	Pts	Qualification	BOL	WIL	RPA	LGM	RTO	ORI
1	Bolívar	10	8	0	2	24	7	+17	24	Advance to Knockout stage	—	2–0	5–1	4–0	2–1	4–0
2	Jorge Wilstermann	10	5	2	3	21	12	+9	17	Advance to Knockout stage	3–1	—	2–0	4–1	0–1	2–2
3	Royal Pari	10	4	1	5	14	15	−1	13	Advance to Knockout stage	1–2	2–1	—	3–0	3–0	1–0
4	Libertad Gran Mamoré	10	4	1	5	10	17	−7	13		0–2	0–2	2–1	—	0–0	4–0
5	Real Tomayapo	10	3	3	4	8	14	−6	12		1–0	1–5	1–1	0–1	—	1–0
6	Oriente Petrolero	10	1	3	6	7	19	−12	6		0–2	1–1	2–1	1–2	1–1	—

Source: FBF, Soccerway
Legend: Blue = home team win; Yellow = draw; Red = away team win.
Rules for classification: 1) Points, 2) Goal difference, 3) Goals for, 4) Away goals for, 5) Yellow cards, 6) Red cards, 7) Drawing of lots.

=== Group B ===
Pos	Team	Pld	W	D	L	GF	GA	GD	Pts	Qualification	AUR	STR	GUA	PAL	RSC
1	Aurora	8	3	4	1	5	4	+1	13	Advance to Knockout stage	—	1–1	0–0	0–0	2–1
2	The Strongest	8	3	3	2	10	6	+4	12	Advance to Knockout stage	0–1	—	1–0	2–0	4–0
3	Guabirá	8	3	2	3	9	7	+2	11		2–0	1–1	—	1–0	0–1
4	Palmaflor del Trópico	8	2	4	2	5	5	0	10		0–0	2–0	3–2	—	0–0
5	Real Santa Cruz	8	1	3	4	4	11	−7	6		0–1	1–1	1–3	0–0	—

Source: FBF, Soccerway
Legend: Blue = home team win; Yellow = draw; Red = away team win.
Rules for classification: 1) Points, 2) Goal difference, 3) Goals for, 4) Away goals for, 5) Yellow cards, 6) Red cards, 7) Drawing of lots.

=== Group C ===
Pos	Team	Pld	W	D	L	GF	GA	GD	Pts	Qualification	BLO	CAR	UVI	NAC	VAC	IPE
1	Blooming	10	7	1	2	16	8	+8	22	Advance to Knockout stage	—	2–1	2–1	2–1	1–2	2–0
2	Always Ready	10	4	3	3	20	17	+3	15	Advance to Knockout stage	1–1	—	4–0	2–2	3–1	4–2
3	Universitario de Vinto	10	4	3	3	17	17	0	15	Advance to Knockout stage	2–1	2–2	—	3–1	3–2	2–0
4	Nacional Potosí	10	3	3	4	20	17	+3	12		0–1	4–0	2–2	—	5–0	1–1
5	Vaca Díez	10	4	0	6	14	21	−7	12		0–2	2–0	2–1	5–2	—	0–1
6	Independiente Petrolero	10	2	2	6	10	17	−7	8		0–2	1–4	1–1	1–2	3–0	—

Source: FBF, Soccerway
Legend: Blue = home team win; Yellow = draw; Red = away team win.
Rules for classification: 1) Points, 2) Goal difference, 3) Goals for, 4) Away goals for, 5) Yellow cards, 6) Red cards, 7) Drawing of lots.

== Knockout stage ==
=== Bracket ===
Quarter-finals
Jorge Wilstermann	1	2	3
The Strongest	2	0	2
Royal Pari	0	2	2
Blooming	0	1	1
Universitario de Vinto	1	2	3 (2)
Bolívar (p)	1	2	3 (3)
Always Ready	0	1	1
Aurora	1	4	5

Semi-finals
Jorge Wilstermann	2	1	3
Royal Pari	0	2	2
Bolívar	3	0	3
Aurora	1	1	2

Finals
Jorge Wilstermann	1	0	1
Bolívar	2	1	3

=== Quarter-finals ===
Team 1	Agg.	Team 2	1st leg	2nd leg
Universitario de Vinto	3–3 (2–3 p)	Bolívar	1–1	2–2
Always Ready	1–5	Aurora	0–1	1–4
Royal Pari	2–1	Blooming	0–0	2–1
Jorge Wilstermann	3–2	The Strongest	1–2	2–0

==== First leg ====
28 November 2023	Universitario de Vinto	1–1	Bolívar	Quillacollo
15:00 UTC−4	Llano 90+2'	Report	Vaca 53'	Stadium: Municipal; Referee: Javier Revollo

29 November 2023	Always Ready	0–1	Aurora	El Alto
15:00 UTC−4		Report	Zaracho 40'	Stadium: Municipal de Villa Ingenio; Referee: Nelson Barro

29 November 2023	Royal Pari	0–0	Blooming	Santa Cruz de la Sierra
19:00 UTC−4		Report		Stadium: Ramón Tahuichi Aguilera; Referee: Hostin Prado

29 November 2023	Jorge Wilstermann	1–2	The Strongest	Cochabamba
20:30 UTC−4	Chumacero 12'	Report	Isnaldo 58' (pen.), 70'	Stadium: Félix Capriles; Referee: Gery Vargas

==== Second leg ====
9 December 2023	Aurora	4–1 (5–1 agg.)	Always Ready	Cochabamba
15:00 UTC−4	Blanco 19', 34', 52'; Barboza 44'	Report	Romero 31'	Stadium: Félix Capriles; Referee: Gery Vargas

9 December 2023	Bolívar	2–2 (3–3 agg.) (3–2 p)	Universitario de Vinto	La Paz
17:30 UTC−4	Vaca 21'; Da Costa 75'	Report	Ramallo 47'; Llano 81' (pen.)	Stadium: Hernando Siles; Referee: Renán Castillo
	Penalties
	Da Costa (penalty scored); Vaca (penalty missed); Villamíl (penalty scored); Justiniano (penalty missed); Algarañaz (penalty scored)		(penalty scored) Lencinas; (penalty missed) Monteiro; (penalty missed) Vila; (penalty scored) Olivares; (penalty missed) Llano

10 December 2023	The Strongest	0–2 (2–3 agg.)	Jorge Wilstermann	La Paz
17:30 UTC−4		Report	Amaral 45+2'; Nahuelpán 83'	Stadium: Hernando Siles; Referee: Juan Nelio García

10 December 2023	Blooming	1–2 (1–2 agg.)	Royal Pari	Santa Cruz de la Sierra
19:30 UTC−4	Arce 90+7' (pen.)	Report	Ribera 87'; Amoroso 90+2' (pen.)	Stadium: Ramón Tahuichi Aguilera; Referee: Raúl Orosco

=== Semi-finals ===
Team 1	Agg.	Team 2	1st leg	2nd leg
Bolívar	3–2	Aurora	3–1	0–1
Jorge Wilstermann	3–2	Royal Pari	2–0	1–2

==== First leg ====
11 December 2023	Bolívar	3–1	Aurora	La Paz
20:00 UTC−4	Bejarano 34'; Rodríguez 53', 59'	Report	Reinoso 18' (pen.)	Stadium: Hernando Siles; Referee: Jordy Alemán

12 December 2023	Jorge Wilstermann	2–0	Royal Pari	Cochabamba
20:00 UTC−4	Machado 32'; Velázquez 42'	Report		Stadium: Félix Capriles; Referee: Dilio Rodríguez

==== Second leg ====
14 December 2023	Aurora	1–0 (2–3 agg.)	Bolívar	Cochabamba
19:30 UTC−4	Barboza 78'	Report		Stadium: Félix Capriles; Referee: Ivo Méndez

14 December 2023	Royal Pari	2–1 (2–3 agg.)	Jorge Wilstermann	Santa Cruz de la Sierra
20:30 UTC−4	Correa 4'; Amoroso 27'	Report	Nahuelpán 90+7' (pen.)	Stadium: Ramón Tahuichi Aguilera; Referee: Renán Castillo

=== Finals ===
16 December 2023
20:00 UTC−4

Jorge Wilstermann	1–2	Bolívar
Amaral 90+1'	Report	Rodríguez 51'; Da Costa 82'

Estadio Félix Capriles, Cochabamba
Referee: Jordy Alemán

18 December 2023
20:00 UTC−4

Bolívar	1–0	Jorge Wilstermann
Da Costa 87'	Report

Estadio Hernando Siles, La Paz
Referee: Ivo Méndez

Bolívar won 3–1 on aggregate.

== Top scorers ==
Rank	Player	Club	Goals
1	(Brazil) Francisco da Costa	Bolívar	9
2	(Colombia) Andrés Llano	Universitario de Vinto	7
3	(Bolivia) Víctor Ábrego	Universitario de Vinto	6
3	(Argentina) Martín Prost	Nacional Potosí	6
5	(Dominican Republic) Edarlyn Reyes	Always Ready	5
6	(Bolivia) Carmelo Algarañaz	Bolívar	4
6	(Argentina) Eugenio Isnaldo	The Strongest	4
6	(Argentina) Marcos Riquelme	Oriente Petrolero	4
6	(Uruguay) Gastón Rodríguez	Blooming	4
6	(Dominican Republic) Dorny Romero	Always Ready	4

Source: Soccerway

== See also ==
- 2023 Bolivian Primera División
