= Pablo Rubinich =

Argentine football coach (born 1978)

Personal information
- Full name: Pablo Damián Rubinich
- Date of birth: 27 December 1978 (age 47)
- Place of birth: San Martín, Argentina

Managerial career
- Years: Team
- 1999–2001: Juventud Unida (youth)
- 2002–2003: Juventud Unida (reserves)
- 2002: Juventud Unida (interim)
- 2018: Duros del Balón
- 2022: Universitario de Vinto (assistant)
- 2023: Real Tomayapo (assistant)
- 2023: Real Tomayapo (interim)
- 2023: Real Tomayapo (interim)
- 2024: Alianza Atlético (assistant)
- 2024: Millonarios de Vinto
- 2024: Real Tomayapo
- 2025: Carlos A. Mannucci
- 2026: GV San José

Pablo Damián Rubinich (born 27 December 1978) is an Argentine football manager.

== Career ==
Born in San Martín, Buenos Aires, Rubinich started his career as a fitness coach of his hometown club Juventud Unida, while also managing their youth sides. He subsequently worked as a fitness coach for Leandro N. Alem (two stints), Flandria (two stints), San Miguel, Deportivo Merlo, Chacarita Juniors and Tristán Suárez before becoming a coordinator of a youth school of Boca Juniors in Tokyo in 2015.

In March 2016, Rubinich returned to his previous coaching role after being included in the staff of Ecuadorian side Duros del Balón. After being also a fitness coach at General Díaz in Paraguay in 2017, he returned to Duros in May 2018, after being appointed manager of the side.

In December 2018, after achieving promotion to the Ecuadorian Serie B, Rubinich left Duros and was named fitness coach of Manta. He worked under the same role at JJ Urquiza, Almirante Brown and Atlético Pantoja before being named assistant manager of Bolivian side Universitario de Vinto in May 2022.

After starting the 2023 campaign as an assistant at Real Tomayapo also in Bolivia, Rubinich was named interim manager of the side on 22 June of that year, replacing compatriot Juan Vita. He returned to his previous role after the appointment of David González, but was again an interim on 1 October after González left.

After returning to his assistant role after the arrival of Martín Brignani, Rubinich left Tomayapo in November 2023 to join Luciano Theiler's staff at Peruvian side Alianza Atlético. He left the latter in February 2024 after Thelier was sacked, and returned to Bolivia in the following month to take over Millonarios de Vinto.

On 11 June 2024, Rubinich returned to Real Tomayapo after being named manager of the club. On 2 December, however, he resigned.

On 10 January 2026, after a period in charge of Carlos A. Mannucci in Peru, Rubinich returned to Bolivia to take over GV San José. On 14 April, after two defeats in as many official matches, he was sacked.
