= Alan Sánchez (footballer, born 2004) =

Bolivian footballer (born 2004)

Personal information
- Full name: Alan Noel Sánchez Ordoñez
- Date of birth: 4 February 2004 (age 22)
- Place of birth: San Lorenzo, Bolivia
- Height: 1.81 m (5 ft 11 in)
- Position: Forward

Team information
- Current team: Always Ready

Youth career
- Proyecto Bolivia 2022
- Gimnasia
- Real Tomayapo

Senior career*
Years	Team	Apps	(Gls)
2021–2022	Real Tomayapo	11	(1)
2022–	Always Ready	1	(0)

International career
2019	Bolivia U15	4	(0)
- * Club domestic league appearances and goals as of 14 September 2023

Alan Noel Sánchez Ordoñez (born 4 February 2004) is a Bolivian professional footballer who plays as a forward for Always Ready.

== Club career ==
Born in San Lorenzo, Tarija, Sánchez played local football in Villamontes, before being picked up by Proyecto Bolivia 2022, a project created to encourage the development of young Bolivian men's footballers. He went on trial with Argentine side Gimnasia shortly before his fifteenth birthday, which he successfully passed.

He returned to Bolivia to sign for Real Tomayapo, being integrated into the first team in September 2021, having impressed with the reserves. He scored his first goal for the club in a 3–1 away loss to Oriente Petrolero on 27 November 2021.

== International career ==
Sánchez represented Bolivia at the 2019 South American U-15 Championship, making four appearances.

== Career statistics ==
=== Club ===
As of 14 September 2023.

Appearances and goals by club, season and competition
Club	Season	League			Cup		Other		Total	
Club	Season	Division	Apps	Goals	Apps	Goals	Apps	Goals	Apps	Goals
Real Tomayapo	2021	Bolivian Primera División	9	1	0	0	0	0	9	1
Real Tomayapo	2022	Bolivian Primera División	2	0	0	0	0	0	2	0
Real Tomayapo	Total		11	1	0	0	0	0	11	1
Always Ready	2022	Bolivian Primera División	0	0	0	0	0	0	0	0
Always Ready	2023	Bolivian Primera División	1	0	0	0	1 (Note: Appearances in the Copa Tiga)	0	2	0
Always Ready	Total		1	0	0	0	1	0	2	0
Career total			12	1	0	0	1	0	13	1
