= Emanuel Paniagua =

Bolivian footballer

Personal information
- Full name: Emanuel Paniagua Leaño
- Date of birth: 5 November 2005 (age 21)
- Place of birth: Tarija, Bolivia
- Height: 1.76 m (5 ft 9 in)
- Position: Forward

Team information
- Current team: ABB (on loan from Always Ready)
- Number: 20

Youth career
- García Agreda
- Cancheritos
- 2022–2023: Always Ready

Senior career*
Years	Team	Apps	(Gls)
2023–	Always Ready	21	(1)
2025–	→ ABB (loan)	9	(0)

International career
2025	Bolivia U20	2	(0)
- * Club domestic league appearances and goals as of 16:53, 23 June 2025 (UTC)

Emanuel Paniagua Leaño (born 5 November 2005) is a Bolivian professional footballer who currently plays as a forward for Always Ready.

== Early life ==
Born in Tarija, Paniagua is the elder brother of fellow professional footballer, Moisés Paniagua, who also plays for Always Ready. The two took an interest in football at a young age, playing futsal at the Los Mineros futsal field in the Fátima neighbourhood of Tarija.

== Club career ==
=== Early career ===
Paniagua began his career with his brother in the academy of semi-professional side García Agreda, where they both won a number of club and individual awards. Paniagua would go on to join Cancheritos, an academy in Cercado, while his brother joined San José de Tarija, the affiliate side of Club San José. The two would be reunited when they both represented the Tarija Department at the National Under-19 Futsal Tournament - having already represented Tarija at both football and futsal.

=== Always Ready ===
Paniagua joined professional side Always Ready in the second half of the 2022 season, alongside his brother. He made his professional debut in the 2023 Copa de la División Profesional on 25 April 2023, coming on as a second-half substitute for William Parra in a 1–1 draw with Blooming. His brother, Moisés, started in the game, and the two shared the pitch following Emanuel's appearance. In September 2024, the Paniagua brothers went on trial with United Arab Emirates club Shabab Al Ahli.

== International career ==
Paniagua represented the Bolivian youth futsal team at the 2022 South American Youth Games.

== Career statistics ==
=== Club ===
As of 13 June 2023.

Appearances and goals by club, season and competition
Club	Season	League			National Cup		League Cup		Continental		Other		Total	
Club	Season	Division	Apps	Goals	Apps	Goals	Apps	Goals	Apps	Goals	Apps	Goals	Apps	Goals
Always Ready	2023	Bolivian Primera División	11	0	0	0	7 (Note: Appearances in the 2023 Copa Tigo)	0	0	0	0	0	18	0
Always Ready	2024	Bolivian Primera División	10	1	0	0	0	0	1 (Note: Appearances in the Copa Libertadores)	0	0	0	11	1
Always Ready	2025	Bolivian Primera División	0	0	0	0	0	0	0	0	0	0	0	0
Always Ready	Total		21	1	0	0	7	0	1	0	0	0	29	1
ABB (loan)	2025	Bolivian Primera División	9	0	0	0	1 (Note: Appearances in the Copa de la División Profesional)	0	0	0	0	0	10	0
Career total			30	1	0	0	8	0	1	0	0	0	39	1

== Personal life ==
Born in Bolivia, Paniagua is of Guinean descent through his paternal grandmother.
