= Cleibson Ferreira =

Brazilian football coach (born 1972)

Personal information
- Full name: Cleibson Ferreira da Silva
- Date of birth: 10 August 1972 (age 54)
- Place of birth: Recife, Brazil
- Height: 1.74 m (5 ft 9 in)
- Positions: Attacking midfielder; forward

Youth career
- 1985–1991: Sport Recife

Senior career*
Years	Team	Apps	(Gls)
1991–1992	Sport Recife	1	(0)
1991	→ Santo Amaro (loan)		
1992–1993	Central		
1993	Esporte de Patos		
1994	Poções		
1994	Maruinense		
1995	Real Potosí		
1995	Bolívar		
1995–1996	Guabirá		
1997	Nacional Potosí		
1997	Fancesa		
1998	Alecrim		
1999–2000	Crato		
2001	Sport Boa Vista		
2001	Formosa		
2002	Ypiranga-PE		
2003	Guarani de Juazeiro		
2003	Oeiras		
2004	Petrolina		
2004	CRAC-MT		
2005	Operários Mafrenses	0	(0)
2005	Umuarama		
2006	Brusque		

Managerial career
- 1997: Nacional Potosí U20
- 1997: Fancesa U20
- 1998: Stormers
- 2002: Grêmio Petrolândia
- 2005: Itacuruba
- 2006: Santa Cruz (assistant)
- 2007: Vera Cruz
- 2007: Náutico (assistant)
- 2008: Náutico U17
- 2009: Náutico U20
- 2009: Náutico (interim)
- 2010: Atlético Mineiro (assistant)
- 2011: Galícia
- 2011: Boquinhense
- 2012: CRAC-MT
- 2012: Ipojuca
- 2013: Coríntians
- 2013: Galícia
- 2013: Juventude-TO
- 2014: Guaraí
- 2014: Afogados
- 2014–2015: América-PE U20
- 2015: Araripina
- 2016: Pesqueira
- 2016: Atlético de Cajazeiras
- 2016: Miguelense
- 2017: Maranhão
- 2017: Atlético de Cajazeiras
- 2018: Sousa
- 2018: CSE
- 2018: Destroyers
- 2019: Port Moresby
- Destroyers
- 2022: Libertad Gran Mamoré
- 2023: Stormers San Lorenzo
- 2023–2024: Real Potosí
- 2025: Globo
- 2025: Real Potosí
- * Club domestic league appearances and goals

Cleibson Ferreira da Silva (born 10 August 1972) is a Brazilian football coach and former player who played as either an attacking midfielder or a forward.

== Playing career ==
Born in Recife, Pernambuco, he was known as Cleibson during his playing days, and featured in one Série A match for Sport Recife in 1991. He finished the year at Santo Amaro on loan, and played for Central in the following season.

In 1995, after representing Esporte de Patos, Poções and Maruinense, Cleibson moved abroad for the first time in his career, joining Bolivian side Real Potosí. He continued to play in the country in the following years, with Bolívar, Guabirá, Nacional Potosí and Fancesa.

Back to Brazil in 1998, Cleibson played for Alecrim, Crato, Sport Boa Vista, Formosa, Ypiranga-PE, Guarani de Juazeiro, Oeiras, Petrolina, CRAC-MT, Operários Mafrenses, Umuarama and Brusque. He retired with the latter in 2006, aged 34.

== Coaching career ==
In 1997, while playing for Nacional Potosí and Fancesa, Ferreira was in charge of the clubs' under-20 team. He had his first managerial experience in the following year, taking over Stormers.

In 2002, now already back in Brazil, Ferreira was the head coach of Grêmio Petrolândia during amateur tournaments. In 2005, he worked under the same capacity at Itacuruba.

In 2006, now permanently retired, Ferreira worked as an assistant of Maurício Simões at Santa Cruz, before being named head coach of Vera Cruz in the following year. He subsequently moved to Náutico, being an assistant of the first team and later under-17 coach before taking over the under-20s in May 2009.

Ferreira was an interim coach at Timbu for a short period, before moving to Atlético Mineiro in 2010, as an assistant. In 2011 he was in charge of Galícia in the Campeonato Baiano Second Division, before ending the season at Campeonato Sergipano Série A2 side Boquinhense.

In December 2012, after being head coach of CRAC-MT and Ipojuca, Ferreira took over Coríntians. He returned to Galícia on 27 February 2013, winning the year's Baiano Second Division, but ended the season at Juventude-TO.

In 2014, Ferreira was in charge of Guaraí and Afogados before taking over América-PE's under-20 team in August of that year. In February 2015, he was named head coach of Araripina.

On 30 November 2015, Ferreira was appointed Pesqueira head coach for the upcoming season. He was sacked the following 21 January, after three consecutive losses, and took over Atlético de Cajazeiras on 9 February.

Ferreira ended the 2016 campaign at Miguelense, achieving promotion with the club. On 2 January 2017, he was presented as head coach of Maranhão, but was dismissed on 6 April, and returned to Atlético just hours later.

On 28 August 2017, Ferreira agreed to a deal with Sousa to become their head coach for the ensuing season. He only lasted two rounds before being sacked on 14 January 2018, and took over CSE on 9 February.

On 14 August 2018, Ferreira returned to Bolivia after becoming the manager of Destroyers. He resigned on 26 October, and moved to Papua New Guinea in July of the following year, taking over Port Moresby.

In February 2020, Ferreira returned to Bolivia to take over Mojocoya, and returned to Destroyers in September of that year. He departed the club in November 2021, and was presented as Libertad Gran Mamoré manager on 5 May 2022.

On 27 February 2023, Ferreira was named Stormers San Lorenzo manager. He left the club on 15 June, and took over Real Potosí five days later.

Sacked by Real Potosí on 25 June 2024, Ferreira returned to his homeland and agreed to a deal with Globo on 13 December. He departed after the end of the 2025 Campeonato Potiguar, and returned to Real Potosí on 9 September of that year.

Ferreira won the 2025 Copa Simón Bolívar with Real Potosí, leading the club back to the top tier after a four-year absence, but was still sacked on 3 March 2026, before any official matches of the new season.

== Honours ==
=== Coach ===
Náutico U20

- Campeonato Pernambucano Sub-20: 2009

Galícia

- Campeonato Baiano Second Division: 2013

Real Potosí

- Copa Simón Bolívar: 2025
