= Pablo Cabanillas =

Bolivian football manager

Personal information
- Full name: Pablo de María Cabanillas Palazuelos
- Date of birth: 30 August 1980 (age 46)
- Place of birth: La Paz, Bolivia

Team information
- Current team: The Strongest (sporting director)

Managerial career
- Years: Team
- 2009–2022: The Strongest (youth)
- 2019–2021: The Strongest (women)
- 2021: The Strongest (interim)
- 2022: Bolivia U20 (women)
- 2022–2023: The Strongest (assistant)
- 2022: The Strongest (interim)
- 2023: The Strongest (interim)
- 2023: The Strongest

Pablo de María Cabanillas Palazuelos (born 30 August 1980) is a Bolivian football manager. He is the current sporting director of The Strongest.

== Career ==
Born in La Paz, Cabanillas started his career in 2008, and joined The Strongest in 2009, in their youth sides. He also took over the club's women's team in 2019, before being named interim manager of the first team on 15 August 2021, after the resignation of Gustavo Florentín.

Cabanillas returned to his previous roles on 21 August 2021, one day after a 2–0 away loss to Oriente Petrolero. On 16 March 2022, he was named manager of the Bolivia women's national under-20 team for the 2022 South American Under-20 Women's Football Championship and the 2022 Bolivarian Games.

In July 2022, Cabanillas became an assistant manager of the first team, being later an interim match of the side for one match after the sacking of Christian Díaz. On 11 August 2023, he was again interim after the departure of Ricardo Formosinho, being permanently appointed manager of the side three days later.

Despite winning the league title, Cabanillas left his managerial role on 13 December 2023, after being named sporting director of Tigre.

== Honours ==
The Strongest

- Bolivian Primera División: 2023
