= Moisés Paniagua =

Bolivian footballer (born 2007)

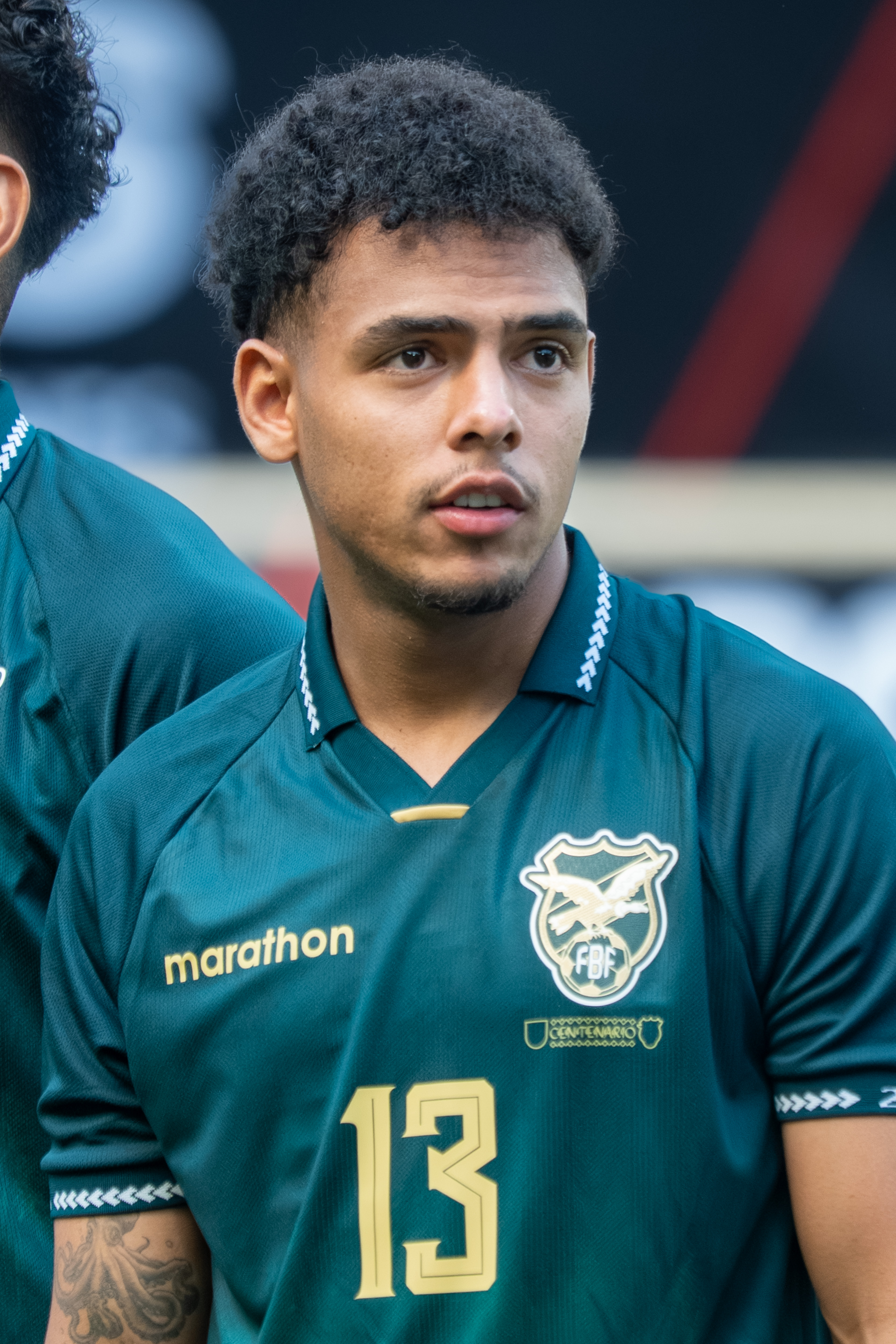
- Paniagua with Bolivia in 2026

Personal information
- Full name: Moisés Paniagua Leaño
- Date of birth: 16 August 2007 (age 19)
- Place of birth: Tarija, Bolivia
- Height: 1.70 m (5 ft 7 in)
- Position: Midfielder

Team information
- Current team: Always Ready
- Number: 40

Youth career
- García Agreda
- San José
- 2022: Always Ready

Senior career*
Years	Team	Apps	(Gls)
2022–	Always Ready	76	(19)
2026–	Wydad AC (loan)	7	(0)

International career^{‡}
2023	Bolivia U17	4	(1)
2025–	Bolivia U20	4	(0)
2025–	Bolivia	9	(2)
- * Club domestic league appearances and goals as of 6 July 2026 (UTC) ‡ National team caps and goals as of 10 June 2026

Moisés Paniagua Leaño (born 16 August 2007) is a Bolivian professional footballer who currently plays as a midfielder for Botola Pro club Wydad AC, on loan from División Profesional club Always Ready, and the Bolivia national team.

== Early life ==
Born in Tarija, Paniagua is the younger brother of fellow professional footballer, Emanuel Paniagua, who also plays for Always Ready. The two took an interest in football at a young age, playing futsal at the Los Mineros futsal field in the Fátima neighbourhood of Tarija.

== Club career ==
=== Early career ===
Paniagua began his career with his brother in the academy of semi-professional side García Agreda, where they both won a number of club and individual awards. Paniagua would go on to join San José de Tarija, the affiliate side of Club San José, while his brother joined Cancheritos, an academy in Cercado. The two would be reunited when they both represented the Tarija Department at the National Under-19 Futsal Tournament - having already represented Tarija at both football and futsal.

=== Always Ready ===
After impressive performances at the Under-16 National Championship in May 2022, Paniagua was scouted by professional side Always Ready. He joined the club in the second half of the 2022 season, alongside his brother. On 19 October 2022, he became the youngest player to score in the Bolivian Primera División when he scored the only goal on his debut in a 1–0 win against Royal Pari. Twenty-four hours after his professional debut, he featured in Always Ready's reserve win over the same opposition, with the La Paz-based club running out 5–2 winners, with Paniagua scoring twice.

Due to civil unrest in the Santa Cruz Department, the Bolivian Football Federation terminated the 2022 Bolivian Primera División season, and Paniagua would have to wait until the following year to feature for Always Ready again. On just his second appearance for the club, he scored the fourth goal in a 5–0 win over Libertad Gran Mamoré. On 2 March 2023, he made his debut in the Copa Libertadores, becoming, at the age of 15 years, 6 months, and 14 days, the joint-second youngest player ever to appear in the Copa Libertadores, only behind Diego Suárez, who set the record in 2017 at the age of 14.

Following his impressive start to his career, he was linked with a move to Europe, with club president Andrés Costa stating that "concrete offers" had been received.

== International career ==
Paniagua was first called up to the Bolivia national under-17 football team in May 2022, for training and five friendly games in Paraguay. Shortly after his Copa Libertadores debut, he travelled to Ecuador to represent Bolivia at the 2023 South American U-17 Championship. There, he scored in a 2–1 win over Peru, also assisting Braian Mamani for the winning goal.

== Career statistics ==
=== Club ===
As of match played 6 July 2026

Appearances and goals by club, season and competition
Club	Season	League			National cup		Continental		Total	
Club	Season	Division	Apps	Goals	Apps	Goals	Apps	Goals	Apps	Goals
Always Ready	2022	FBF División Profesional	1	1	–		–		1	1
Always Ready	2023	FBF División Profesional	23	3	10	0	1 (Note: Appearance in Copa Libertadores)	0	34	3
Always Ready	2024	FBF División Profesional	27	2	0	0	8 (Note: Four appearances and one goal in Copa Libertadores, four appearances in Copa Sudamericana)	1	35	3
Always Ready	2025	FBF División Profesional	25	13	7	3	0	0	32	16
Always Ready	Total		76	19	19	3	9	1	102	23
Wydad AC (Loan)	2025-26	Botola Pro	7	0	–		5	0	12	0
Career Total			82	19	19	3	14	1	113	23

=== International ===
As of matches played 10 June 2026

Appearances and goals by national team and year
National team	Year	Apps	Goals
Bolivia	2025	5	0
Bolivia	2026	4	2
Total		9	2

Scores and results list Bolivia's goal tally first, score column indicates score after each Paniagua goal.

List of international goals scored by Moisés Paniagua
No.	Date	Venue	Opponent	Score	Result	Competition
1	26 March 2026	Estadio BBVA, Guadalupe, Mexico	Suriname	1–1	2–1	2026 FIFA World Cup qualification
2	31 March 2026	Estadio BBVA, Guadalupe, Mexico	Iraq	1–1	1–2	2026 FIFA World Cup qualification

== Personal life ==
Born in Bolivia, Paniagua is of Guinean descent through his paternal grandmother.
