= Daniel Brizuela =

Daniel Brizuela may refer to:

- Daniel Brizuela (footballer) (born 1968), Argentine football manager and former player
- Daniel Brizuela (boxer) (born 1985), Argentine boxer
