= Denis Pinto =

Bolivian football player (born 1995)

Personal information
- Full name: Denis Franklin Pinto Saavedra
- Date of birth: August 25, 1995 (age 31)
- Place of birth: Bolivia
- Height: 1.82 m (6 ft 0 in)
- Position: Forward

Team information
- Current team: Real Tomayapo
- Number: 19

Senior career*
Years	Team	Apps	(Gls)
2013–2015	Blooming	10	(2)
2015–2016	Real Potosí	1	(0)
2017–2021	Oriente Petrolero	0	(0)
2021–2023	Aurora	36	(6)
2023	Club Blooming	1	(0)
2023	Vaca Díez	13	(3)
2024	Club Blooming	3	(0)
2024–	Real Tomayapo	29	(1)

International career
2015	Bolivia U-20	1	(0)
- * Club domestic league appearances and goals as of 30 December 2025

Denis Franklin Pinto Saavedra (born August 25, 1995) is a Bolivian professional footballer who plays as forward for Real Tomayapo.

== Club career statistics ==
Club performance			League		Cup		League Cup		Total	
Season	Club	League	Apps	Goals	Apps	Goals	Apps	Goals	Apps	Goals
League		Apertura and Clausura			Copa Aerosur		Total			
2011/12	Blooming	Liga de Fútbol Profesional Boliviano	-	-	-	-	-	-	-	-
2013/14	Blooming	Liga de Fútbol Profesional Boliviano	10	2	-	-	-	-	10	2
2014/15	Blooming	Liga de Fútbol Profesional Boliviano	-	-	-	-	-	-	-	-
2015/16	Real Potosí	Liga de Fútbol Profesional Boliviano	1	0	-	-	-	-	1	0
2022	Aurora	Primera Division de Bolivia	-	-	-	-	-	-	-	-
Total			11	2	-	-	-	-	11	2

== International career ==
Pinto was summoned to the Bolivian U-20 team to play in the 2015 South American Youth Football Championship.
