= Víctor Hugo Andrada =

Argentine footballer and manager (born 1958)

Personal information
- Full name: Víctor Hugo Andrada Canalis
- Date of birth: 25 December 1958 (age 67)
- Place of birth: Santa Fe, Argentina
- Height: 1.74 m (5 ft 9 in)
- Position: Right midfielder

Senior career*
| Years | Team | Apps | (Gls) |
| 1983 | Colón | 41 | (7) |
| 1984–1986 | Gimnasia-LP | 87 | (7) |
| 1986–1989 | Blooming | 109 | (25) |
| 1989 | Unión Española | 18 | (0) |
| 1990–1992 | Racing | 38 | (1) |
| 1993–1994 | Unión | 58 | (3) |
| 1995 | The Strongest | 17 | (4) |
| 1996 | San José | 31 | (7) |
| 1997–1998 | Destroyers | 68 | (6) |
| 1999–2001 | Real Potosí | 77 | (6) |
| Total | | 544 | (66) |

Managerial career
- 2001: Real Potosí (interim)
- 2003: Independiente Petrolero
- 2004: Nacional Potosí
- 2005: Real Potosí
- 2006–2009: Nacional Potosí
- 2009–2010: Blooming
- 2010: Real Potosí
- 2011: San José
- 2011–2012: Nacional Potosí
- 2013: Jorge Wilstermann
- 2013: Blooming
- 2014: Real Potosí
- 2015: Ciclón
- 2016: Mushuc Runa
- 2017: Nacional Potosí
- 2018–2019: Desamparados
- 2019–2021: Guabirá
- 2021: Palmaflor
- 2022: Real Tomayapo
- 2022: Royal Pari
- 2023: Nacional Potosí
- 2023: Nueva Santa Cruz
- 2024: Chacaritas
- 2024: Real Potosí
- 2024: Guabirá
- 2025: Nueva Santa Cruz
- 2025: Oriente Petrolero
- * Club domestic league appearances and goals

Víctor Hugo Andrada Canalis (born 25 December 1958 in Santa Fe), nicknamed Copito, is an Argentine football manager and former player who played as a midfielder.

== Club career ==
In his native country he played professional football for Colón de Santa Fe, Gimnasia y Esgrima de La Plata, Racing Club de Avellaneda and Unión de Santa Fe, but the neighbouring country of Bolivia is where he spent most of his extensive career, playing for teams such as, Blooming, The Strongest, San José, Destroyers and Real Potosí. He also made a short spell in the Liga Chilena de Fútbol with Unión Española in 1989.

== Managerial career ==
Following his retirement, "Copito" pursued a career as a football manager in Bolivia. In 2005, he took over club Real Potosí, but he was sacked due to poor results. In 2007, he made his comeback with Nacional Potosí, but the team fell short from winning the promotion after losing in a two-game series to Guabirá. Nevertheless, Andrada got his recognition in 2008 as he took the team back to the Copa Simón Bolivar finals; only this time, his team came victorious. Therefore, gained promotion to the Liga de Fútbol Profesional Boliviano for the first time in the club's history. The next year Andrada had an explosive start in first division with Nacional, leading the standings during the first ten weeks; however, the team began to stagger and eventually fell behind. On June 14, 2009, after 18 games into the season, Andrada resigned from his job in protest to constant intrusion of the board of directors in team affairs. On July 6, 2009, he assumed his managerial duties with Blooming, where he won the national league title of Clausura 2009, defeating Bolívar in the final match.
