= Alex Arancibia =

Bolivian footballer (born 1990)

Personal information
- Full name: Alex Arancibia Chavez
- Date of birth: January 28, 1990 (age 36)
- Place of birth: Santa Cruz de la Sierra, Bolivia
- Position: Goalkeeper

Team information
- Current team: Aurora

Senior career*
Years	Team	Apps	(Gls)
2007–2009	Oriente B	140	(0)
2010–2015	Oriente Petrolero	39	(0)
2015–2016	Petrolero	14	(0)
2016–2018	Wilstermann	28	(0)
2019	Sport Boys	6	(0)
2021–2022	Independiente Petrolero	12	(0)
2022	Universitario Sucre	3	(0)
2023	Bolívar	1	(0)
2024–	Tomayapo	9	(0)

International career
2009	Bolivia U-20	4	(0)
- * Club domestic league appearances and goals as of 30 December 2025

Alex Arancibia Chavez (born January 28, 1990) commonly known as Arancibia, is a Bolivian professional footballer who plays for Liga de Fútbol Profesional Boliviano club Aurora.

== Club career ==
Arancibia started to play for Oriente B of Primera A. He made some important saves in the 2009 season to avoid relegation. Gustavo Quinteros called his name for the Oriente Petrolero 2010 squad and he became the reserve goalkeeper at Oriente Petrolero.

After spending the 2015–16 season with Club Petrolero, he joined Wilstermann on 30 June 2016.

Arancibia signed with Sport Boys Warnes for the 2019 season.

== International career ==
Arancibia made four appearances for the Bolivia U-20 team at the 2009 South American U-20 Championship. He was twice named as a substitute for the senior team during qualification for the 2018 FIFA World Cup, but did not play.
