= Alan Sanchez =

Alan Sanchez or Sánchez may refer to:

- Alan Sánchez (footballer, born 1985), Argentine football midfielder
- Alan Sánchez (footballer, born 2004), Bolivian football forward
- Alan Sanchez (boxer) (born 1991), Mexican boxer
