= Andrés Marinangeli =

Argentine football manager (born 1981)

Personal information
- Full name: Roberto Andrés Marinangeli
- Date of birth: 24 April 1981 (age 45)
- Place of birth: Pérez, Argentina
- Position: Goalkeeper

Team information
- Current team: Deportivo San Martín (manager)

Youth career
- 1985–1990: Mitre de Pérez
- 1990–1994: Renato Cesarini

Senior career*
Years	Team	Apps	(Gls)
1994–1997	Renato Cesarini		
1998–1999	Rosario Central	0	(0)
2000–2001	La Serena		
2002	Banco Nación		
2003–2006	Totoras Juniors		
2007–2008	Gödeken		
2009	Arroyo Seco		
2010–2011	EMF Aluche		

Managerial career
- 2010–2011: EMF Aluche (assistant)
- 2012–2015: Equatorial Guinea (women) (assistant)
- 2015–2017: Equatorial Guinea (assistant)
- 2018: EMF Aluche
- 2020: Iglesia La Vid
- 2020–2021: Dibba Al-Hisn U20
- 2021: Real Santa Cruz (assistant)
- 2022: Zapla
- 2022: Real Santa Cruz
- 2023: Libertad Gran Mamoré
- 2023: Guabirá
- 2024: Real Santa Cruz
- 2024: Real Potosí
- 2025–2026: IN San Juan
- 2026–: Deportivo San Martín
- * Club domestic league appearances and goals

Roberto Andrés Marinangeli (born 24 April 1981) is an Argentine football manager and former player who played as a goalkeeper. He is the current manager of Bolivian club Deportivo San Martín.

== Playing career ==
Born in Pérez, Santa Fe, Marinangeli began his career with Renato Cesarini, and played for the reserve side of Rosario Central before moving to Chile with Deportes La Serena in 2000.

Back to his home country in 2002, Marinangeli played for Banco Nación, Totoras Juniors, Gödeken and Arroyo Seco before moving to Spain in 2010, with EMF Aluche.

== Managerial career ==
While playing for Aluche, Marinangeli was a goalkeeping coach of the youth sides and also acted an assistant manager of the first team. In 2012, he joined Esteban Becker's staff at the Equatorial Guinea women's football team.

In 2017, Marinangeli was recruited by Guangzhou Evergrande to work in their football schools in Madrid, and also returned to Aluche in January 2018, now named first team manager. In the 2019–20 season, he was a part of Lolo Escobar's coaching staff at Las Rozas CF, working as a goalkeeping coach.

In August 2020, after a short period in charge of lowly Madrilenian side Iglesia La Vid FC, Marinangeli moved to the United Arab Emirates to work as the under-18 manager of Dibba Al-Hisn SC. He switched teams and countries again in July 2021, after being named David Perdiguero's assistant at Bolivian club Real Santa Cruz.

Marinangeli left the Bolivian side in December 2021, being named manager of Altos Hornos Zapla in his home country shortly after. On 16 March 2022, he returned to Real Santa Cruz, now being appointed first team manager in the place of sacked Daniel Farrar.

On his managerial debut for the Albos on 2 April 2022, Marinangeli's side defeated Oriente Petrolero by 2–1. On 21 November, he left Santa Cruz.

On 5 January 2023, Marinangeli remained in Bolivia after being named in charge of Jorge Wilstermann. Eighteen days later, however, a new board of the club presented Christian Díaz as manager, and he was dismissed; on 17 February, he remained in the country after taking over top tier newcomers Libertad Gran Mamoré, but was sacked less than a month later.

On 15 August 2023, Marinangeli was appointed manager of Guabirá, still in the Bolivian top tier. He was sacked from the club on 8 November, and returned to Real Santa Cruz the following 9 April.

Marinangeli resigned from Real Santa Cruz on 20 August 2024.

== Personal life ==
Marinangeli's brother Sergio is also a football manager. Both worked together at Iglesia La Vid.
