= Rodrigo Santana =

Rodrigo Santana is the name of:

- Rodrigo Santana (footballer) (born 1982), Brazilian football player and manager
- Rodrigão (born 1979), Brazilian volleyball player
