= Perdiguero (disambiguation) =

Perdiguero is a Pyrenean summit.

Perdiguero may also refer to:

== People ==
- David Perdiguero (born 1974), Spanish football manager.
- Miguel Ángel Martín Perdiguero (born 1972), Spanish cyclist

== Breeds of dog ==
- Perdiguero de Burgos
- Perdiguero Navarro
