= Bidari García =

Spanish footballer

Bidari
Personal information
- Full name: Bidari García De Cortázar Mejías
- Date of birth: 27 November 1989 (age 36)
- Place of birth: Madrid, Spain
- Height: 1.90 m (6 ft 3 in)
- Position: Defender

Team information
- Current team: Vaca Díez

Youth career
- 2004–2008: Cartagena

Senior career*
Years	Team	Apps	(Gls)
2008–2011	Cartagena	54	(2)
2011–2012	Leganés	16	(1)
2012–2013	SS Reyes	24	(2)
2013–2014	Ethnikos Achna	16	(1)
2015–2016	Nacional Potosí	21	(2)
2017	Avilés	12	(1)
2017–2018	Sheikh Russel	9	(1)
2018	Lincoln Red Imps	10	(1)
2019	Rosario	–	(–)
2019	Plaza Colonia	0	(0)
2020	Deportes Puerto Montt	4	(0)
2021	Montañesa	12	(0)
2021	Real Estelí	0	(0)
2021	Messina	–	(–)
2021–2022	Massese	–	(–)
2022	Santo Domingo	–	(–)
2023–	Vaca Díez	0	(0)
- * Club domestic league appearances and goals as of 30 March 2023

Bidari García de Cortázar Mejías (born 27 September 1989) is a Spanish footballer and international model who plays as a defender for Bolivian club Vaca Díez.

== Career ==
García has played in Spain for Cartagena, Leganés and SS Reyes before moving to Cyprus to play for Ethnikos Achna. He then had spells playing in Bolivia and Bangladesh.

On 2 February 2018, García joined Gibraltar Premier Division side Lincoln Red Imps.

In 2023, he joined Bolivian club Vaca Díez.
