= Wilson Escalante =

Bolivian footballer (born 1977)

Personal information
- Full name: Wilson Joel Escalante Paniagua
- Date of birth: 6 May 1977 (age 49)
- Place of birth: Santa Cruz de la Sierra, Bolivia
- Position: Defender

Team information
- Current team: Torre Fuerte (manager)

Senior career*
Years	Team	Apps	(Gls)
1997–2007	Oriente Petrolero		
2006	→ La Paz FC (loan)		
2007	Jorge Wilstermann		
2008	Guabirá		

International career
2002–2003	Bolivia	3	(0)

Managerial career
- 2018: Torre Fuerte
- 2019: Real Santa Cruz
- 2020: Vaca Díez
- 2022: Real América
- 2022–: Torre Fuerte
- * Club domestic league appearances and goals

Wilson Joel Escalante Paniagua (born 6 May 1977) is a Bolivian football manager and former player who played as a defender. He is the current manager of Torre Fuerte.

Escalante played in three matches for the Bolivia national football team from 2002 to 2003. He was also part of Bolivia's squad for the 2001 Copa América tournament.
