= Humberto Viviani =

Bolivian footballer and manager (born 1980)

Personal information
- Full name: Humberto Viviani Ribera
- Date of birth: 10 December 1980 (age 45)
- Place of birth: Riberalta, Bolivia
- Height: 1.73 m (5 ft 8 in)
- Position: Defender

Senior career*
Years	Team	Apps	(Gls)
1998	Chaco Petrolero		
1999–2000	The Strongest		
2001–2002	Pompeya		
2003–2005	Aurora		
2006	Universitario Sucre	24	(0)
2007–2010	Aurora		
2010	Fancesa		
2011	Ciclón Tarija		
2011–2012	Enrique Happ		
2012	Municipal Tiquipaya		
2013	Oruro Royal		
2013–2014	Municipal Tiquipaya		

Managerial career
- 2018: Arauco Prado (assistant)
- 2019–2020: Atlético Palmaflor
- 2021: Aurora
- 2021–2022: Atlético Palmaflor
- 2023: Van
- 2023: Libertad Gran Mamoré
- 2023–2024: Guabirá
- 2024–2025: Real Tomayapo
- 2025: Jorge Wilstermann
- 2026: GV San José
- * Club domestic league appearances and goals

Humberto Viviani Ribera (born 10 December 1980) is a Bolivian football manager and former player who played as a defender.

== Career ==
Born in Riberalta, Viviani represented Chaco Petrolero, The Strongest, Pompeya, Aurora and Universitario Sucre in a professional output. He subsequently represented amateur sides Fancesa, Ciclón Tarija, Enrique Happ, Municipal Tiquipaya and Oruro Royal. He retired in 2014 with Tiquipaya.

In 2019, after working at Enrique Happ's youth categories and as an assistant manager at Arauco Prado, Viviani was appointed manager of Atlético Palmaflor. He achieved a first-ever promotion to the Primera División in his first season, but was sacked on 9 December 2020, after a poor run of form.

On 18 December 2020, Viviani was named manager of former club Aurora. He resigned on 17 October 2021, and returned to Palmaflor on 3 November.

Viviani was sacked from Palmaflor on 22 October 2022, and had a short spell abroad in charge of Armenian club FC Van before returning to his home country with Libertad Gran Mamoré on 20 July 2023. He resigned from the latter on 6 November, and took over Guabirá two days later.

On 1 August 2024, Viviani was sacked from Guabirá. On 3 December, he was named manager of fellow top-tier side Real Tomayapo, but was also dismissed the following 6 July.

On 5 August 2025, Viviani was appointed manager of Jorge Wilstermann. He left after suffering relegation, and took over GV San José on 27 August 2026, where he only spent twelve days before resigning.
