= Integración del Norte San Juan F.C. =

Bolivian football club

IN San Juan
- Full name: Integración del Norte San Juan Fútbol Club
- Founded: 2019; 7 years ago
- Ground: Samuel Vaca Jiménez; Warnes
- Capacity: 18,000
- President: Jorge Pontons
- Manager: David Perdiguero
- League: Copa Simón Bolívar
- 2025: Torneo Provincial ACF, 2nd
Home colours	Away colours

Integración del Norte San Juan Fútbol Club, known as IN San Juan, San Juan de Satélite Norte or just San Juan, is a Bolivian professional football club from Santa Cruz de la Sierra. The club was founded in 2019, and competes in Copa Simón Bolívar, holding home matches at the Estadio Samuel Vaca Jiménez in Warnes, with a capacity of 18,000 people.

== History ==
Founded in 2019, IN San Juan first qualified to the Copa Simón Bolívar in 2025, and managed to reach the national stage of the competition. After finishing first in the group stage, the club knocked out Deportivo Shalon, Nueva Cliza and Universitario de Sucre in the round of 16, quarterfinals and semifinals, respectively, to reach the finals for the first time ever.

== Managers ==
- (Bolivia) Junior Pontons (2024–2025)
- (Argentina) Andrés Marinangeli (2025–2026)
- (Bolivia) Junior Pontons (2026)
- (Spain) David Perdiguero (2026–)
