= Joaquín Pérez (football manager) =

Argentine football manager (born 1985)

Personal information
- Date of birth: 21 November 1985 (age 40)
- Place of birth: San Francisco, Argentina

Managerial career
- Years: Team
- Sportivo Belgrano (youth)
- 2016: Sportivo Belgrano (assistant)
- 2017: Sportivo Belgrano
- 2017: Atlético Paraná (assistant)
- 2017–2018: Mitre (SdE) (assistant)
- 2018: Mitre (SdE)
- 2019: Unión San Felipe (assistant)
- 2019: Mitre (SdE) (assistant)
- 2019–2020: Deportivo Morón (assistant)
- 2020–2021: Godoy Cruz (reserves assistant)
- 2022: Deportivo Madryn (assistant)
- 2023: Palmaflor del Trópico (assistant)
- 2023: Palmaflor del Trópico

Joaquín Pérez (born 21 November 1985) is an Argentine football manager.

== Career ==
Born in San Francisco, Córdoba, Pérez began his career with hometown side Sportivo Belgrano. After being in charge of the youth sides and later assistant of Ricardo Pancaldo, he became first team manager ahead of the 2017 season, but left in April of that year to join Pancaldo's staff at Atlético Paraná.

On 30 January 2019, after working both as an assistant of Arnaldo Sialle and later manager at Mitre (SdE), Pérez moved abroad and was named Andrés Yllana's assistant at Unión San Felipe in Chile. On 22 March, he returned to Mitre with Sialle, and followed him to Deportivo Morón on 15 May.

On 11 January 2020, Pérez joined Godoy Cruz's reserve team, also as an assistant. He left on 6 January 2022 to join Deportivo Madryn, as Pancaldo's assistant.

On 22 December 2022, Pérez became Daniel Brizuela's assistant at Bolivian side Palmaflor del Trópico. On 8 May of the following year, he was named interim manager after Brizuela was sacked.
