= Álvaro Peña (Bolivian footballer) =

Bolivian footballer (born 1965)

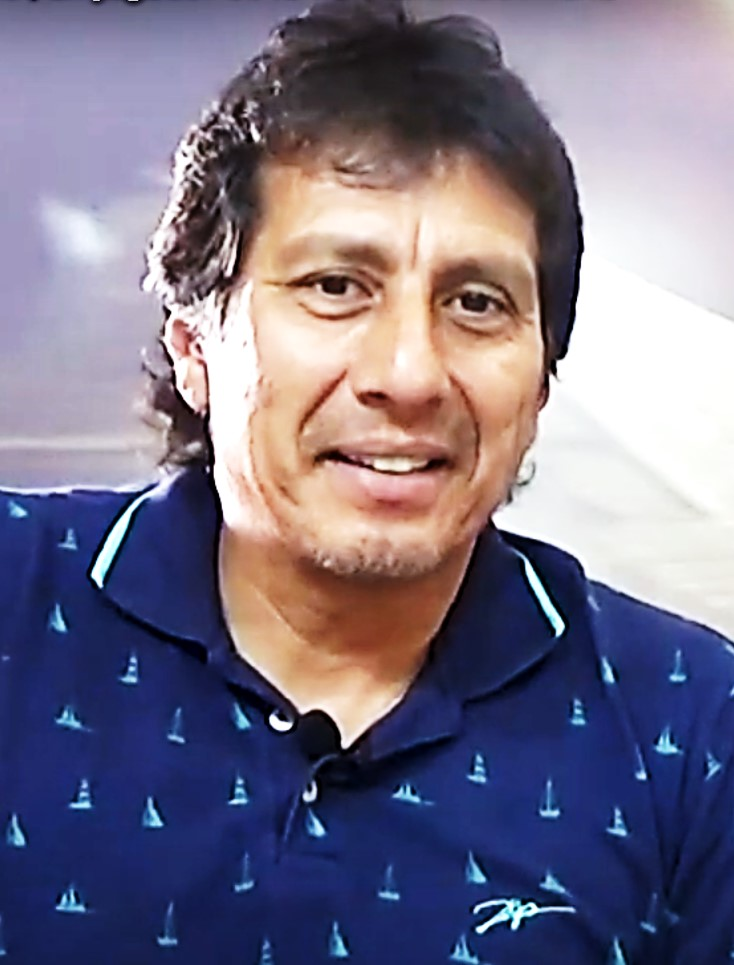

Personal information
- Full name: Guillermo Álvaro Peña Peña
- Date of birth: 11 February 1965 (age 61)
- Place of birth: Santa Cruz de la Sierra, Bolivia
- Height: 1.78 m (5 ft 10 in)
- Position: Striker

Youth career
- Academía Tahuichi

Senior career*
Years	Team	Apps	(Gls)
1987–1989	Blooming		
1990–1992	San José		
1993–1994	Temuco	29	(7)
1995	Cortuluá	18	(6)
1995	Bolívar		
1996	Real Santa Cruz		
1997	Destroyers		
1998	Oriente Petrolero		
1999	The Strongest		
2000	Bolívar		
2001–2002	Mariscal Braun		
2002–2003	Iberoamericana		

International career
1987–1996	Bolivia	43	(4)

Managerial career
- 2004–2005: Oriente Petrolero
- 2006: Destroyers
- 2006–2007: Blooming
- 2007–2013: Dynamo Kyiv (youth)
- 2014: Guabirá
- 2014: San José
- 2017–2018: Jorge Wilstermann
- 2019–2021: Real Santa Cruz (assistant)
- 2021: Nacional Potosí
- 2021: Real Tomayapo
- 2022: Jorge Wilstermann
- 2023: Independiente Petrolero
- 2024: Blooming
- 2025: Oriente Petrolero
- * Club domestic league appearances and goals

Guillermo Álvaro Peña Peña (born 11 February 1965) is a Bolivian football manager and player who played as a striker.

== Playing career ==
=== Club ===
At club level he played for San José, where he was the Bolivian league topscorer in 1992. He played abroad with Deportes Temuco of Chile between 1993 and 1994 and for Cortuluá of Colombia in 1995.

His other clubs in Bolivia include Blooming, Oriente Petrolero, Bolívar, Destroyers, The Strongest and Mariscal Braun.

=== International ===
He played 43 international matches and scored 4 goals for the Bolivia national team He made one appearance in the 1994 FIFA World Cup and represented his country in 2 FIFA World Cup qualification matches.

== Managerial career ==
After retiring as a player, Peña took up coaching. He has served as the manager for Blooming, Oriente Petrolero and Destroyers. He is currently under contract with Ukrainian team Dynamo Kyiv, where he is part of the youth sector's coaching staff.

== Personal life ==
His younger brother José is also a football manager.

== Honours ==
Individual

- Liga de Fútbol Profesional Boliviano Top Scorer: 1992 (32 goals, with San José)
