= Oswaldo Blanco =

Colombian footballer (born 1991)

Personal information
- Full name: Oswaldo Enrique Blanco Mancilla
- Date of birth: May 21, 1991 (age 35)
- Place of birth: Cartagena de Indias, Colombia
- Height: 1.84 m (6 ft 0 in)
- Position: Forward

Team information
- Current team: Aurora
- Number: 7

Youth career
- 2008–2010: Atlético Nacional

Senior career*
Years	Team	Apps	(Gls)
2010–2013	Deportivo Merlo	75	(3)
2013–2014	Los Andes	35	(5)
2014–2015	América de Cali	14	(1)
2016	Acassuso	9	(0)
2016–2017	Deportivo Merlo	37	(12)
2017–2018	Deportivo Laferrere	77	(12)
2019	Sportivo Italiano	17	(3)
2020–2021	Alianza	25	(9)
2021	Palmaflor	28	(7)
2022–2024	Aurora	106	(18)
2025	San Antonio Bulo Bulo	10	(3)
2025–	Aurora	14	(3)
- * Club domestic league appearances and goals as of 30 December 2025

Oswaldo Blanco (born May 21, 1991) is a Colombian professional footballer who plays as a forward for Club Aurora.

== Career ==
=== Club career ===
Blanco joined Alianza FC in El Salvador for the 2020 season.
