= Claudio Rodríguez (footballer, born 1969) =

Argentine footballer and manager

Personal information
- Full name: Claudio Leonardo Rodríguez
- Date of birth: 3 February 1969 (age 57)
- Place of birth: Santiago del Estero, Argentina
- Height: 1.78 m (5 ft 10 in)
- Positions: Midfielder; forward

Team information
- Current team: Petrolero (manager)

Youth career
- Mitre SdE
- Boca Juniors

Senior career*
Years	Team	Apps	(Gls)
1989–1993	Boca Juniors	40	(9)
1992	→ Universidad de Chile (loan)	26	(2)
1993–1994	Alvarado		
1994–1995	San Martín Tucumán	39	(14)
1995–1996	Atlético Tucumán	36	(10)
1996–1997	Nueva Chicago	22	(5)
1998	Douglas Haig	13	(3)
1999	Atlanta		
2000	San José		
2001	Oriente Petrolero	3	(0)
2003	Guabirá	11	(0)
2004	Atlético Ñuñorco	2	(0)

Managerial career
- 2012–2013: Real Santa Cruz (assistant)
- 2018: Real Santa Cruz (assistant)
- 2018–2020: Royal Pari (youth)
- 2020: Royal Pari (assistant)
- 2021–2022: Real Santa Cruz (youth)
- 2023: Real Santa Cruz
- 2024: Destroyers
- 2025–: Petrolero
- * Club domestic league appearances and goals

Claudio Leonardo Rodríguez (born 3 February 1969) is an Argentine football coach and former player who played as either a midfielder or a forward. He is the current manager of Bolivian club Petrolero.

== Playing career ==
Born in Santiago del Estero, Rodríguez began his career with hometown side Mitre (SdE) before joining the youth setup of Boca Juniors. He made his senior debut with the side in November 1989, but lost space after the arrival of Óscar Tabárez as manager.

Rodríguez spent the 1992 season at Chilean side Universidad de Chile, before returning to Boca in the following year. He subsequently represented Alvarado, San Martín de Tucumán, Atlético Tucumán, Nueva Chicago, Douglas Haig and Atlanta in his home country, before moving abroad in 2000 with San José.

Rodríguez remained in Bolivia in the following years, playing for Oriente Petrolero and Guabirá.

== Managerial career ==
Rodríguez was an assistant of José Peña at Real Santa Cruz in 2012, 2013 and 2018. He later worked as a youth and assistant manager at Royal Pari,

Rodríguez returned to Real Santa Cruz in 2021, being in charge of the youth categories. On 3 January 2023, he was named manager of the first team, along with compatriot Miguel Abrigo.

Rodríguez and Abrigo resigned from Real Santa Cruz on 21 August 2023.

== Personal life ==
In February 2003, Rodríguez was arrested with another man after being accused of drug trafficking. Sentenced of four years and five months of jail in December 2004, he was released after 27 months imprisoned in March 2006, being absolved of his charges.

Rodríguez is nicknamed Rata (mouse). He was initially called Rattín by his uncle (after Antonio Rattín), being shortened to Rata when he arrived in Buenos Aires.
