= Cristian Reynaldo =

Bolivian footballer (born 1978)

Personal information
- Full name: Cristian Jesús Reynaldo Gómez
- Date of birth: 16 September 1978 (age 48)
- Place of birth: Trinidad, Bolivia
- Height: 1.83 m (6 ft 0 in)
- Position: Forward

Team information
- Current team: Alianza Beni (manager)

Senior career*
Years	Team	Apps	(Gls)
1997–1999	Bolívar		(5)
1998	→ Real Potosí (loan)		(18)
2000	Real Potosí		(18)
2001	The Strongest		(5)
2002	Real Potosí		(31)
2003–2004	Blooming		(22)
2005	Jorge Wilstermann		(2)
2005	Universitario de Sucre		(3)
2006	San José		(7)
2007	Real Mamoré		(4)
2009	Nacional Potosí		(15)
2010	La Paz		(1)

Managerial career
- 2012–2019: Universitario del Beni
- 2020: Gran Mamoré
- 2021: Villa Real Sociedad
- 2022–2023: Gran Mamoré
- 2023: Universitario del Beni
- 2024–: Alianza Beni
- * Club domestic league appearances and goals

Cristian Jesús Reynaldo Gómez (born 16 September 1978) is a Bolivian football manager and former player who played as a forward. He is the current manager of Alianza Beni.
