= Associação Boquinhense de Desportos =

Brazilian football club

Boquinhense
- Full name: Associação Boquinhense de Desportos
- Nickname(s): ABD; Verdão do Sul; Hulk Sergipano
- Founded: October 11, 1965
- Ground: Temistão, Boquim, Sergipe state, Brazil
- Capacity: 2,000
Home colours	Away colours

Associação Boquinhense de Desportos, commonly known as Boquinhense, is a Brazilian football club based in Boquim, Sergipe state.

== History ==
The club was founded on October 11, 1965.

== Stadium ==
Associação Boquinhense de Desportos play their home games at Estádio Temístocles Carvalho, nicknamed Temistão. The stadium has a maximum capacity of 3,000 people.
