= David González (football manager) =

Spanish football coach (born 1985)

Personal information
- Full name: David González Sanz
- Date of birth: 16 April 1985 (age 41)
- Place of birth: Barcelona, Spain

Managerial career
- Years: Team
- 2011–2013: Horta (youth)
- 2013–2014: Mutilvera (youth)
- 2014–2016: Murchante (youth)
- 2016: Cibao (assistant)
- 2019: Atlético San Cristóbal
- 2019: Dominican Republic U23
- 2019–2020: Dominican Republic
- 2021–2023: Atlético Pantoja
- 2023: Real Tomayapo
- 2024: Tudelano
- 2025: Badajoz
- 2026: Oriente Petrolero

David González Sanz (born 16 April 1985) is a Spanish football manager.

== Coaching career ==
González began coaching in his native Spain, coaching in the academy of Athletic Bilbao, as well as coaching at UA Horta, UD Mutilvera and Murchante FC. In 2016, he moved to the Dominican Republic, joining Real Madrid's academy in the country.

González later took up the role of technical director at Atlético San Cristóbal, managing the club for a short stint in March 2019. In May 2019, the Dominican Football Federation announced the appointment of González as manager of both the Dominican Republic national football team and the Dominican Republican under-23 side.

On 24 June 2023, after two years in charge of Atlético Pantoja, González was appointed manager of CD Real Tomayapo in the Bolivian Primera División. He resigned from the latter club on 29 September, and returned to his home country on 28 January 2024, after being named at the helm of CD Tudelano in Segunda Federación.

Replaced by Jonathan Risueño in June 2024, González spent ten months without a club before being appointed manager of Tercera Federación side CD Badajoz on 1 April 2025. On 9 June, after missing out promotion in the play-offs, he left.

On 29 December 2025, González returned to Bolivia after taking over Oriente Petrolero. The following 15 May, however, he was sacked.
