= Juan Vita =

Argentine footballer

Personal information
- Date of birth: 11 May 1987 (age 39)
- Place of birth: Mar del Plata, Argentina
- Height: 1.75 m (5 ft 9 in)
- Position: Midfielder

Team information
- Current team: CA Güemes

Youth career
- Club Lácar
- River Plate

Senior career*
Years	Team	Apps	(Gls)
2008–2009	Alvarado	4	(0)
2011–2012	Deportivo Morón	5	(0)

Managerial career
- 2012–2014: Fénix (youth)
- 2014: Fénix (interim)
- 2014–2018: Banfield (youth)
- 2019: Costa del Este
- 2020–2022: Nicaragua
- 2022: Guanacasteca
- 2023: Real Tomayapo
- 2024: Racing Club II
- 2025-Present: CA Güemes
- * Club domestic league appearances and goals

Racing Club II

Juan Vita (born 11 May 1987) is an Argentine football manager and former player who played as a midfielder. He is the current manager of CA Güemes.

== Playing career ==
Vita began his career at Club Lácar, joining River Plate's youth ranks at the age of 13. During Vita's senior career, he played for Alvarado and Deportivo Morón, before retiring at the age of 22 to focus on coaching.

== Managerial career ==
In 2014, Vita was named interim manager of Argentinian club Fénix. In 2019, after working in the youth sides of Banfield, he moved to Panama to manage Costa del Este.

Vita led the club to second place in Panama's 2019 Apertura. After being named manager of the year, he resigned from the club, and was named manager of the Nicaragua national team in August 2020.

Sacked by Nicaragua on 2 March 2022, Vita was presented at Costa Rican side Guanacasteca on 7 June 2022. His relationship with the Guanaco team ended on September 23 of that same year.

On 15 March 2023, Vita switched teams and countries again, after being appointed in charge of Real Tomayapo in Bolivia, but resigned on 22 June.
