= Clube Recreativo Atlético Campoverdense =

Brazilian football club

CRAC
- Full name: Clube Recreativo Atlético Campoverdense
- Founded: October 19, 2005
- Ground: Estádio Municipal Félix Belém de Castro, Campo Verde, Mato Grosso state, Brazil
- Capacity: 3,000
Home colours	Away colours

Clube Recreativo Atlético Campoverdense, commonly known as CRAC, is a Brazilian football club based in Campo Verde, Mato Grosso state.

== History ==
The club was founded on October 19, 2005.

== Stadium ==
Clube Recreativo Atlético Campoverdense play their home games at Estádio Municipal Félix Belém de Castro. The stadium has a maximum capacity of 3,000 people.
