= Daniel Brizuela (footballer) =

Argentine footballer

Personal information
- Full name: Claudio Daniel Brizuela
- Date of birth: 30 August 1968 (age 58)
- Place of birth: Buenos Aires, Argentina
- Height: 1.70 m (5 ft 7 in)
- Position: Forward

Senior career*
Years	Team	Apps	(Gls)
1989	Atlanta		
1990–1991	Mérida		
1992	Valdez	10	(1)
1992–1993	Atlante	12	(1)
1993–1994	Deportes Concepción		
1994–1995	Celaya		
1996–1997	Deportivo Morón	2	(0)
1997–1998	Deportivo Italchacao		
1998–1999	Alacranes de Durango	8	(0)
2000–2001	Jorge Wilstermann		
2002–2003	Tauro		

Managerial career
- 2006: Boca Juniors (youth)
- 2006–2007: Barracas Bolívar
- 2008: Celaya
- 2023: Palmaflor del Trópico
- * Club domestic league appearances and goals

Claudio Daniel Brizuela (born 30 August 1968) is an Argentine football manager and former player who played as a forward.

== Career ==
Brizuela played for clubs of Argentina, Chile, México, Bolivia, Ecuador, Venezuela and Panamá. After retiring, he worked as a sporting director at Deportivo Merlo during the 2005–06 season, before being a manager of Sportivo Barracas in 2006.

Brizuela was later a youth coordinator at Atlas, and subsequently worked as a sporting manager at Olmedo in 2010. He returned to his home country with Racing Club in the following year, as a technical secretary.

Brizuela left Racing in the end of 2012, and joined San Lorenzo's intake area in the following year. He was also a director of Udinese's project in Argentina in 2014, and worked at Rosario Central in 2015, also in the intake area.

In 2022, after six years at River Plate's intake area, Brizuela joined José Pékerman's staff at the Venezuela national team, as a head scout. In December of that year, he returned to managerial duties after taking over Palmaflor del Trópico in Bolivia.

On 7 May 2023, Brizuela resigned from Palmaflor.
