= Rodrigo Venegas =

Chilean football manager

Personal information
- Full name: Rodrigo Andrés Venegas Pérez
- Date of birth: 4 October 1988 (age 38)
- Place of birth: Santiago, Chile

Team information
- Current team: Provincial Osorno (manager)

Managerial career
- Years: Team
- 2015–2016: San Luis (youth)
- 2019: San José (assistant)
- 2020: Blooming (assistant)
- 2020–2021: Deportes La Serena (assistant)
- 2021–2022: Blooming
- 2022: Independiente Petrolero
- 2023: Always Ready
- 2023–2024: Oriente Petrolero
- 2024: Provincial Osorno
- 2025: Oriente Petrolero
- 2025–: Provincial Osorno

Rodrigo Andrés Venegas Pérez (born 4 October 1988) is a Chilean football manager, currently in charge of Provincial Osorno.

== Career ==
After starting his career as manager of a Unión Española youth school, Venegas later worked at Academia de Fútbol de Juvenal Olmos and Universidad de Chile before being named under-17 manager of San Luis de Quillota in 2015. In 2019, he moved to Bolivia after being named Miguel Ponce's assistant at San José.

Venegas continued to work as Ponce's assistant in the following years, at Blooming and Deportes La Serena. On 28 November 2021, he returned to Blooming after being named manager, in the place of departing Hernán Meske.

Venegas led Blooming to the semifinals of the 2022 Apertura, but resigned on 10 August 2022. On 9 September, he took over Independiente Petrolero of the same league.

After leaving Independiente in the end of the 2022 season, Venegas took over Always Ready on 30 August 2023, but left the latter on a mutual agreement exactly two months later. On 8 November, he replaced Antonio Puche at the helm of Oriente Petrolero.

Venegas was sacked from Oriente on 23 February 2024. On 26 December, after a period back in his home country with Provincial Osorno, he agreed to return to the Bolivian top tier after taking over Aurora, but the deal later collapsed.

Venegas returned to Oriente Petrolero on 4 March 2025, replacing sacked Joaquín Monasterio. Back to Chile, he was appointed as the manager of Provincial Osorno on 30 July 2025.
