= Ricardo Formosinho =

Portuguese footballer

Personal information
- Full name: Ricardo Manuel Nunes Formosinho
- Date of birth: 9 September 1956 (age 70)
- Place of birth: Setúbal, Portugal
- Height: 1.77 m (5 ft 10 in)
- Position: Midfielder

Youth career
- 1972–1974: Vitória Setúbal

Senior career*
Years	Team	Apps	(Gls)
1974–1979	Vitória Setúbal	80	(9)
1979–1981	Varzim	46	(3)
1981–1982	Amora	24	(1)
1982–1987	Vitória Setúbal	111	(6)
1987–1990	Farense	51	(1)
1990–1991	Olhanense	12	(1)
Total		324	(21)

International career
1973–1974	Portugal U18	12	(1)
1977	Portugal U21	1	(0)

Managerial career
- 1990–1992: Olhanense (player-coach)
- 1992–1994: Louletano
- 1994: Amora
- 1995–1997: Camacha
- 1997–1998: União Montemor
- 1998–1999: Imortal
- 2000–2001: Penafiel
- 2001: Imortal
- 2002: Espinho
- 2002–2003: Seixal
- 2003–2004: Farense
- 2005: Santa Clara
- 2005–2006: Setúbal B
- 2006: Chaves
- 2007: Khaleej
- 2007–2008: Santa Clara
- 2009: Chaves
- 2010: Đồng Tâm Long An
- 2011: Becamex Binh Duong
- 2013: Caála
- 2014–2015: Kuala Lumpur
- 2016–2018: Manchester United (assistant)
- 2019–2020: Tottenham Hotspur (assistant)
- 2021: Al-Hilal
- 2022–2023: Olympique Khouribga
- 2023: The Strongest
- 2023–2024: Modern Future
- 2024–2025: Fenerbahçe (assistant)
- 2025–2026: Benfica (assistant)
- * Club domestic league appearances and goals

Ricardo Manuel Nunes Formosinho (born 9 September 1956) is a Portuguese former professional footballer who played as a midfielder, currently a manager.

== Playing career ==
Born in Setúbal, Formosinho spent most of his career with Vitória de Setúbal, making his Primeira Liga debut during 1974–75 and finishing the season with only two league appearances. In the following years he became a regular for the Sado River club, scoring a career-best six goals in 26 matches in 1976–77 as it finished in sixth position.

After three years in the top flight, two with Varzim and one with Amora, Formosinho returned to Vitória for a further five campaigns, the last being spent in the Segunda Liga. In the 1987 off-season, the 31-year-old returned to the latter tier and joined Farense, appearing in 27 games in his first year (one goal) and being relegated in his second.

Formosinho retired from football in June 1991 after one season with another Algarve side, Olhanense, in division three. He appeared in 286 top-division matches over 14 seasons, netting 20 times.

== Coaching career ==
Formosinho started working as a manager with his last team, acting as player-coach in the 1990–91 season and leading them to promotion to the second tier. For the remainder of the decade, he coached in the second and third divisions, attaining another promotion to the former competition in 1999 with Imortal.

Formosinho continued working in the same leagues in the 2000s, his biggest achievement being leading Penafiel to the fifth position in division two 2000–01. In 2003–04, he was also part of José Mourinho's coaching staff at Porto, with the campaign ending in national championship and UEFA Champions League conquest.

In the 2004–05 season, Formosinho was in charge of Santa Clara in the second division, being appointed for the last seven rounds and helping the financially troubled Azores club finally avoid relegation, winning three games, drawing one and losing three. In the following campaign, he returned to his main side Vitória and worked as both technical director and reserve team coach.

Late into the decade, Formosinho also plied his trade in Saudi Arabia and Vietnam; he also worked with Mourinho at Real Madrid in the scouting department. In July 2013, he was sacked as Angola's Recreativo da Caála manager.

Formosinho was appointed as head coach of Malaysian club Kuala Lumpur City for the 2015 season, being relieved of his duties after less than three months in charge due to poor results. In the summer of 2016 he again paired with Mourinho, acting as his assistant at Manchester United; in November 2019, they reunited at fellow English Premier League team Tottenham Hotspur, with Formosinho leaving on 6 August 2020.

In March 2021, Formosinho became manager of Al-Hilal in the Sudan Premier League. Two years later, he joined inaugural Egyptian League Cup winners Modern Future from The Strongest in the Bolivian Primera División. On 26 December, he led the former to the final of the Egyptian Super Cup after beating Pyramids 14–13 on penalties; he was dismissed in January 2024.

Formosinho reunited with Mourinho once again in June 2024, at Fenerbahçe in the Turkish Süper Lig. After the latter was fired in August 2025, he chose Formosinho for the staff of his next club, Benfica.

== Honours ==
=== Manager ===
Amora

- Segunda Divisão: 1993–94

Imortal

- Segunda Divisão: 1998–99

Al Hilal

- Sudan Premier League: 2021

The Strongest

- Bolivian Primera División: 2023
