= Estadio Bicentenario de Villa Tunari =

Multi-use stadium in Bolivia

Estadio Bicentenario
- Interactive map of Estadio Bicentenario
- Full name: Estadio Olímpico Bicentenario de Villa Tunari
- Location: Villa Tunari, Bolivia
- Coordinates: 16°57′04″S 65°23′59″W
- Owner: Villa Tunari Government
- Capacity: 25,000
- Surface: Grass
- Field size: 105 × 68 m

Construction
- Groundbreaking: 1 December 2013
- Opened: 8 September 2018
- Cost: US$ 13 million

Tenant
- Palmaflor del Trópico

Estadio Olímpico Bicentenario de Villa Tunari is a multi-use stadium in Villa Tunari, Bolivia. It is currently used mostly for football matches, on club level by local sides Palmaflor del Trópico. The stadium has a capacity of 25,000 spectators.

The construction of the stadium began on 1 December 2013, being stopped in 2015 but restarted in June 2016. The construction ended in 2018, with the stadium being inaugurated on 8 September of that year by president Evo Morales, with a match between Bolívar and The Strongest.
