= Estadio Roberto Jordán Cuéllar =

Stadium in Bolivia

- El coloso de la Amazonía
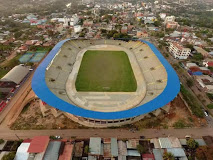
- Interactive map of Estadio Roberto Jordán Cuéllar
- Full name: Estadio Roberto Jordán Cuéllar
- Location: Cobija, Bolivia
- Coordinates: 11°01′28.28″S 68°45′33.62″W
- Owner: Pando Department Government
- Capacity: 24,000

Construction
- Built: 13 May 2013 – 4 September 2015
- Opened: 4 April 2016
- Cost: around 80 million bolivianos

Tenants
- Mariscal Sucre; Universitario de Pando; Vaca Díez

Estadio Roberto Jordán Cuéllar is a multi-use stadium in Cobija, Bolivia. It is currently used mostly for football matches, on club level by local sides Mariscal Sucre, Universitario de Pando and Vaca Díez. The stadium has a capacity of 24,000 spectators.
