= Rodrigo Santana (footballer) =

Brazilian footballer

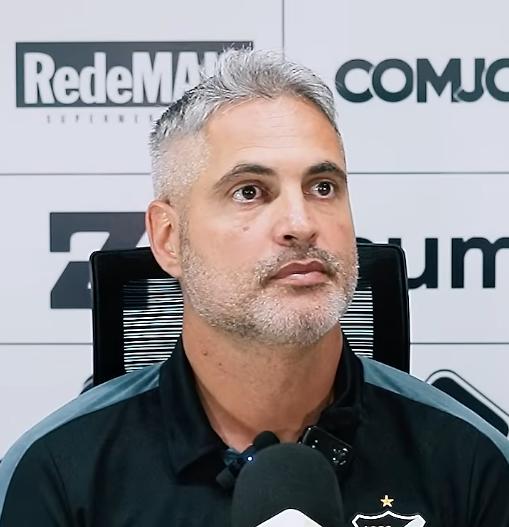
- Santana in 2025

Personal information
- Full name: Rodrigo Marques de Santana
- Date of birth: 29 May 1982 (age 44)
- Place of birth: Santos, Brazil
- Position: Attacking midfielder

Team information
- Current team: Volta Redonda (head coach)

Youth career
- Portuários
- Santos
- Jabaquara
- Comercial de Registro

Senior career*
Years	Team	Apps	(Gls)
2004	América de Natal		
2010	Confiança		

Managerial career
- 2010: Camboriú (assistant)
- 2010: Camboriú
- 2011: Pinheiros U20
- 2011: Pinheiros
- 2012: Uberaba (assistant)
- 2012: Portuguesa Santista
- 2012: União Suzano
- 2013: Grêmio Barueri (assistant)
- 2013–2014: São Carlos U20
- 2014: São Carlos (interim)
- 2014–2016: Juventus-SP
- 2016: Uberaba
- 2017–2018: URT
- 2018–2019: Atlético Mineiro U20
- 2019: Atlético Mineiro (interim)
- 2019: Atlético Mineiro
- 2020: Avaí
- 2020: Coritiba
- 2021: Confiança
- 2023: RANS Nusantara
- 2023: Vaca Díez
- 2024: Athletic-MG
- 2024–2025: Remo
- 2025: ABC
- 2026: Volta Redonda
- 2026: Ponte Preta
- 2026: Amazonas
- 2027–: Volta Redonda
- * Club domestic league appearances and goals

Rodrigo Marques de Santana (born 29 May 1982), known as Rodrigo Santana, is a Brazilian football coach and former player who played as an attacking midfielder. He is the current head coach of Volta Redonda.

== Career ==
Born in Santos, São Paulo, Santana played as a midfielder and retired in 2010, aged 28, after suffering a hand injury while representing Confiança. He started his career as Camboriú's assistant, being named head coach shortly after.

In 2011, Santana was named head coach of Pinheiros' under-20 squad, being in charge of the first team afterwards. He left the club in November, being immediately appointed Nenê Belarmino's assistant at Uberaba.

On 14 February 2012, Santana left Uberaba and was named Portuguesa Santista head coach. Late in the year, he was also in charge of União Suzano during a trip in Bolivia.

In 2013, Santana was Grêmio Barueri's assistant during the Campeonato Paulista Série A2. On 5 November of that year, he was presented as head coach of the under-20 squad of São Carlos for the ensuing Copa São Paulo de Futebol Júnior; the following 8 February, he replaced fired Roberto Oliveira as head coach of the main squad, acting as an interim until the end of the competition and suffering relegation.

On 10 June 2014, Santana left São Carlos and was appointed head coach of Juventus the following day. He was sacked on 11 March 2016, after achieving promotion to the second division of Paulistão the previous year.

On 15 April 2016, Santana returned to Uberaba and was named head coach of the main squad. On 26 October, he was named at the helm of URT.

On 20 July 2018, Santana signed for Atlético Mineiro as a coordinator of the youth division. On 4 October 2018, he was named head coach of the under-20s. On 12 April 2019, he was appointed interim first team head coach after the dismissal of Levir Culpi, and on 24 June, he was named permanent head coach.

On 13 October 2019, Santana was sacked after a defeat to Grêmio. On 16 February 2020, he took over Avaí in the place of sacked Augusto Inácio, but was himself dismissed on 1 August.

On 29 October 2020, Santana replaced fired Jorginho at the helm of Coritiba in the top tier. He was himself dismissed on 13 December, after winning only two points out of 15.

On 12 May 2021, Santana was named head coach of Confiança in the Série B, but was sacked on 26 July after the club was in the last position.

On 5 December 2022, Santana was briefly announced as one of the new assistant coaches for Corinthians 2023 season. However, on the next day, the signing was cancelled due to Santana being linked to anti-democratic acts related to the 2022 Brazilian general election.

On 27 July 2023, after a brief period at Indonesian side RANS Nusantara, Santana was named head coach of Bolivian Primera División side Vaca Díez. He returned to his home country on 9 December, after being appointed in charge of Série C newcomers Athletic-MG, but left on a mutual agreement the following 5 March.

On 23 May 2024, Santana was announced as head coach of fellow third division side Remo. He led the club to a promotion to the second division, but was sacked on 13 March 2025.

On 2 July 2025, Santana was named in charge of ABC back in the third division. He was dismissed on 18 August, with the club threatened with relegation.

On 8 December 2025, Santana was appointed Volta Redonda head coach for the upcoming season. The following 22 February, he left to take over Ponte Preta.

Santana departed Ponte on 26 May 2026, and was announced at Amazonas just hours later. On 13 November, as the latter club's financial situation worsened, he left, and returned to Voltaço the following day.

== Managerial statistics ==
As of 29 May 2026

Managerial record by team and tenure
Team	Nat	From	To	Record								Ref
Team	Nat	From	To	G	W	D	L	GF	GA	GD	Win %	Ref
Atlético Mineiro (interim)	(Brazil)	12 April 2019	24 June 2019	17	8	3	6	21	18	+3	47.06	
Atlético Mineiro	(Brazil)	24 June 2019	13 October 2019	24	10	3	11	30	35	−5	41.67	
Avaí	(Brazil)	16 February 2020	1 August 2020	6	3	2	1	8	6	+2	50.00	
Coritiba	(Brazil)	6 November 2020	14 December 2020	6	0	2	4	4	9	−5	0.00	
Confiança	(Brazil)	26 May 2021	26 July 2021	14	2	4	8	11	20	−9	14.29	
RANS Nusantara	(Indonesia)	2 February 2023	28 April 2023	13	0	2	11	13	35	−22	0.00	
Vaca Díez	(Bolivia)	27 July 2023	9 December 2023	17	4	3	10	19	36	−17	23.53	
Athletic-MG	(Brazil)	9 December 2023	5 March 2024	9	5	1	3	15	10	+5	55.56	
Remo	(Brazil)	23 May 2024	13 March 2025	26	14	6	6	40	23	+17	53.85	
ABC	(Brazil)	2 July 2025	18 August 2025	7	1	4	2	10	11	−1	14.29	
Volta Redonda	(Brazil)	8 December 2025	22 February 2026	8	3	3	2	10	7	+3	37.50	
Ponte Preta	(Brazil)	22 February 2026	26 May 2026	10	3	1	6	8	14	−6	30.00	
Amazonas	(Brazil)	26 May 2026	13 November 2026	10	2	4	4	8	15	−7	20.00	
Total				148	46	34	68	174	219	−45	31.08	—
