= David Perdiguero =

Spanish football manager

Personal information
- Full name: David Perdiguero Márquez
- Date of birth: 26 April 1974 (age 52)
- Place of birth: Madrid, Spain

Team information
- Current team: IN San Juan (manager)

Managerial career
- Years: Team
- La Salle Carabanchel (youth)
- Aviación (youth)
- Sur Latina (youth)
- Aluche (youth)
- 2015–2017: Leganés (youth)
- 2017–2019: Atlético Madrid (youth)
- 2019: Bolivia U15
- 2019–2021: Atlético Aluche
- 2021: Real Santa Cruz
- 2022: Universitario de Vinto
- 2026–: IN San Juan

David Perdiguero Márquez (born 26 April 1974) is a Spanish football manager, currently in charge of Bolivian club IN San Juan.

== Career ==
Born in Madrid, Perdiguero worked at several youth sides in his native region, before joining CD Leganés' youth setup in 2015. In July 2019, after working at Atlético Madrid, he was hired by the Bolivian Football Federation to work as manager of the under-13 and under-15 squads.

Perdiguero subsequently returned to Spain, after being named manager of CD Atlético Aluche CF in the regional leagues. On 22 July 2021, he returned to Bolivia after being named manager of Real Santa Cruz in the place of Néstor Clausen.

Perdiguero's first professional match occurred on 26 July 2021, a 5–0 home routing over San José. Despite avoiding relegation and remaining undefeated at home, he opted to leave the club on 31 December as his contract expired.

Perdiguero returned to Bolivia and its top tier on 28 May 2022, taking over Universitario de Vinto, but was sacked on 15 August.
