= José Peña (Bolivian footballer) =

Bolivian footballer and manager (born 1968)

Personal information
- Full name: José Enrique Peña Peña
- Date of birth: 10 September 1968 (age 58)
- Place of birth: Santa Cruz de la Sierra, Bolivia
- Position: Midfielder

Team information
- Current team: Deportivo FATIC (manager)

Senior career*
Years	Team	Apps	(Gls)
1986–1988	Real Santa Cruz		
1989	Universitario Sucre		
1990	Ciclón		
1991	Always Ready		
1992–1993	The Strongest		
1994	San José		
1995	Destroyers		(4)
1996	Real Santa Cruz		(2)
1997	Oriente Petrolero		(2)
1998	Real Potosí	32	(9)
1999	The Strongest	33	(5)
2000	Millonarios		
2001	Bolívar		
2002	Independiente Petrolero		
2003–2004	Oriente Petrolero		

Managerial career
- 2008: Bancruz
- 2009: Guabirá
- 2010: Ciclón
- 2012–2013: Real Santa Cruz
- 2014: San José (assistant)
- 2017–2018: Destroyers
- 2019–2020: Real Santa Cruz
- 2022: Deportivo FATIC
- 2023: Libertad Gran Mamoré
- 2024–: Deportivo FATIC
- * Club domestic league appearances and goals

José Enrique Peña Peña (born 10 September 1968) is a Bolivian football manager and former player who played as a midfielder. He is the current manager of Deportivo FATIC.

== Playing career ==
Born in Santa Cruz de la Sierra, Peña represented Real Santa Cruz (two stints), Universitario de Sucre, Ciclón, Always Ready, The Strongest (two stints), San José, Destroyers, Oriente Petrolero (two stints), Real Potosí, Millonarios, Bolívar and Independiente Petrolero. He retired with Oriente in 2004, aged 36.

== Managerial career ==
After retiring, Peña started his managerial career with Bancruz in 2008. He won the 2009 Copa Simón Bolívar with Guabirá, and was in charge of Ciclón for a brief period in the following year, taking over the club in June and resigning in August.

In January 2021, Peña was named in charge of Real Santa Cruz, and missed out promotion in the final stages of the 2012–13 Liga Nacional B. In 2014, he was a part of his brother's staff at San José, and both later started a football school in their hometown.

Peña returned to managerial duties in 2017, taking over another club he represented as a player, Destroyers. He was sacked on 13 August 2018, and returned to Real Santa Cruz in 2019.

On 31 August 2022, Peña was announced at Deportivo FATIC. The following 14 March, he returned to the top tier after being named in charge of newcomers Libertad Gran Mamoré, but was sacked on 20 July 2023.

== Personal life ==
Peña's older brother Álvaro was also a footballer and is also a manager. He represented Bolivia in the 1994 FIFA World Cup.

== Honours ==
=== Manager ===
Guabirá

- Copa Simón Bolívar: 2009
