= C.D. Palmaflor del Trópico =

Bolivian football club

Palmaflor del Trópico
- Full name: Club Deportivo Palmaflor del Trópico
- Nickname: Fieras de Palmaflor
- Founded: 10 September 2008 (as Club Municipal Vinto)
- Dissolved: December 2023; 2 years ago
- Ground: Bicentenario; Villa Tunari, Bolivia
- Capacity: 25,000
- Chairman: Evo Morales
- Manager: Joaquín Pérez
- League: AFC Primera A
- 2023: División Profesional, 17th of 17 (relegated by average)
Home colours	Away colours

Club Deportivo Palmaflor del Trópico, best known as Palmaflor del Trópico, was a Bolivian football club based in Villa Tunari, in the Cochabamba Tropic. Founded in 2008, it was dissolved after being relegated from the Bolivian Primera División at the end of the 2023 season.

The club was named Municipal Vinto until 2019, and Club Atlético Palmaflor until the end of 2022.

== History ==
The club was founded on 10 September 2008 as Club Municipal Vinto and was entered into the Cochabamba Football Association. After some seasons in the lower tiers of the regional football association, the club started experiencing financial problems which in 2017 led to its sale to a group of entrepreneurs hailing from Inquisivi Province in La Paz Department who had settled in Quillacollo.

The club was moved from Vinto to Quillacollo by its new owners and earned promotion to the AFC's Primera A in 2018 by winning the Primera B championship. In the first championship of the 2019 Primera A season, Municipal Vinto finished as runners-up after losing the final to Arauco Prado but managed to qualify for the Copa Simón Bolívar. Previous to the start of that competition, the club initiated the legal process before the Bolivian Football Federation to rename itself to Atlético Palmaflor, in honor to the owners' roots in La Paz.

In the 2019 Copa Simón Bolívar, Municipal Vinto managed to advance out of the group stage by winning all of its matches. In the following stage they were drawn against Real Santa Cruz, losing one match and winning the other, and then losing on penalties. Nevertheless, the club qualified for the semifinals as lucky loser and in that stage faced Deportivo FATIC from the department of La Paz. The first leg was won by Municipal Vinto by a score of 4–0, while the second leg in El Alto ended in a draw that qualified the club for the final. In the final, Municipal Vinto once again played against Real Santa Cruz, this time winning both legs (1–0 in Santa Cruz de la Sierra and 2–0 in Quillacollo) and securing its first ever promotion to the División Profesional, and also becoming the first team based in Quillacollo to play in the Bolivian top flight in 41 years, after Bata.

In their first season in the top flight, Palmaflor managed to qualify for an international competition for the first time ever, drawing with San José on the final matchday to finish in eighth place and qualify for the 2021 Copa Sudamericana. In that campaign, the team was managed by Humberto Viviani and Xabier Azkargorta, who replaced Viviani for the final rounds of the tournament.

On 16 November 2022, after another qualification to the Copa Sudamericana, Palmaflor relocated from Quillacollo to the Cochabamba Tropic after its ownership was transferred to the Six Federations of the Cochabamba Tropic, with former president of Bolivia Evo Morales being one of the board members. On 3 December, the club's Facebook account revealed their new name, Club Deportivo Palmaflor del Trópico, and released a new logo the following day; a day later, however, the logo was removed and labelled as "unofficial".

Although the club under its new ownership made an effort to build a strong squad, their participation in the 2023 Copa Sudamericana was short-lived, being eliminated after a 6–0 loss to Blooming in the first stage. Concurrently, the club's financial situation worsened and payments to players and coaching staff began to be delayed for several months, which in turn led to the departure of several key players and affected the team's performance in the domestic league as the poor results threw Palmaflor into the relegation zone. The early exit from international competition was cited by Evo Morales as one of the factors that led to the club's downfall, as it deprived Palmaflor from receiving a monetary prize of US$ 900,000 that would have helped to sustain the club's budget for the remainder of the year. In spite of the difficult situation, the club's authorities began to distance themselves from their responsibilities, and on 18 October 2023, the board led by Denar Sarzuri and recognized by the Bolivian Football Federation resigned. Palmaflor's relegation from the División Profesional was eventually confirmed on 26 November 2023, after a 7–1 loss to Bolívar and a victory for Libertad Gran Mamoré against Blooming.

After the relegation, the club was unable to register player after being sanctioned by FIFA, and subsequently folded after not entering the 2024 Primera A AFC.

== Last squad ==
As of 8 October 2022

Note: Flags indicate national team as defined under FIFA eligibility rules; some limited exceptions apply. Players may hold more than one non-FIFA nationality.

No.	Pos.	Nation	Player
1	GK	BOL	Alejandro Torrez
2	DF	BOL	Ronaldo Arancibia
3	DF	BOL	Jennry Alaca
4	MF	BOL	Iván Vidaurre
5	MF	BOL	Santiago Arce
6	DF	BOL	Pablo Pedraza
7	FW	BOL	Freddy Abastoflor
8	MF	BOL	Boris Condori
9	FW	BRA	Wesley Tanque
10	MF	BRA	Igor Soares
11	MF	ARG	Maximiliano Gómez
12	GK	BOL	Gustavo Salvatierra
13	GK	BOL	Widen Rojas
14	DF	BOL	Walter Rioja

No.	Pos.	Nation	Player
15	DF	BOL	Ariel Juárez
17	MF	BOL	Didí Torrico
18	FW	FRA	Jean-Christophe Bahebeck
19	MF	BOL	Adalid Terrazas
20	MF	BOL	Amílcar Sánchez
21	DF	BOL	Jordy Candia
22	MF	BOL	Denilzon Ramallo
23	GK	BOL	Edilson Vásquez
25	FW	FRA	Balamine Savane
26	DF	ARG	Joaquín Lencinas
27	DF	BOL	Stiven Vargas
30	FW	BRA	Erverson
32	MF	BOL	Deybi Ancieta
37	DF	BOL	Diego Corpus

== Honours ==
=== Domestic ===
- Copa Simón Bolívar:
  - Winners (1): 2019
- AFC Primera A:
  - Runners-up (1): 2019-A
- AFC Primera B:
  - Winners (1): 2018
