= Libertad Gran Mamoré F.C. =

Bolivian football club

Libertad Gran Mamoré
- Full name: Libertad Gran Mamoré Fútbol Club
- Nickname: El Equipo del Pueblo
- Founded: 2008; 18 years ago
- Dissolved: 12 March 2024; 2 years ago, merged with Alianza Beni
- Ground: Estadio Gran Mamoré
- Capacity: 15,000
- President: José Luis Rodríguez
- League: Primera A ABF
- 2023: División Profesional, 15th of 17 (relegated by playoff)
Home colours	Away colours

Libertad Gran Mamoré Fútbol Club, sometimes known as just Gran Mamoré, was a Bolivian football club based in Trinidad, Beni. Founded in 2008, they play in the first tier of the Beni Football Association Championship, holding home matches at the Estadio Gran Mamoré, with a capacity of 15,000 people. They took part in the Bolivian Primera División in 2023.

== History ==
Founded in 2008 by two Christian brothers who intended to create a Christian football team, the club was named Fútbol Club Libertad, and reached the first division of the Beni Football Association in 2009. In 2018, they won their first regional championship, qualifying to the Copa Simón Bolívar.

In 2020, Libertad was renamed to Libertad Gran Mamoré Fútbol Club, with the intention of rescue the memories of the dissolved Real Mamoré. In November 2022, the club first reached the final of the Simón Bolívar. Despite losing the final to Vaca Díez, they achieved a first-ever promotion to the Primera División after defeating Universitario de Sucre in the promotion/relegation play-offs.

Libertad Gran Mamoré competed in Primera División in 2023, but was relegated at the end of the season after losing the relegation play-off to San Antonio Bulo Bulo.

On 12 March 2024, it was announced that Libertad Gran Mamoré had reached an agreement to merge into fellow Beni regional league club Alianza Beni, in order to enter the 2024 Copa Simón Bolívar under the name Alianza Beni FC Gran Mamoré.

== Managers ==
- (Bolivia) Cristian Reynaldo (2020)
- (Argentina) Carlos Leeb (2021)
- (Brazil) Cleibson Ferreira (2022)
- (Bolivia) Cristian Reynaldo (2022–2023)
- (Argentina) Andrés Marinangeli (2023)
- (Bolivia) José Peña (2023)
- (Bolivia) Humberto Viviani (2023)
- (Argentina) Marcelo Straccia (2023)
