= Christian Díaz =

Argentine footballer (born 1976)

Personal information
- Full name: Christian Lionel Díaz
- Date of birth: 12 May 1976 (age 50)
- Place of birth: Florencio Varela, Argentina
- Height: 1.73 m (5 ft 8 in)
- Position: Left back

Team information
- Current team: Deportivo Madryn (manager)

Youth career
- Olimpo

Senior career*
Years	Team	Apps	(Gls)
1995–2000	Independiente	119	(4)
2000–2001	Udinese	32	(1)
2001–2002	Mallorca	8	(0)
2002–2003	Levante	39	(0)
2003	Albacete	6	(0)
2004	Ciudad Murcia	17	(0)
2005	Almería	4	(0)
2005–2006	Olimpo	18	(1)
2006–2007	Huracán	39	(0)
2007–2009	Arsenal Sarandí	47	(0)
Total		329	(6)

Managerial career
- 2012: Independiente
- 2013: Deportes Iquique
- 2015: San Martín Porres
- 2016: Olimpo
- 2017: Quilmes
- 2018–2019: Santa Tecla
- 2019–2021: Wilstermann
- 2021: Royal Pari
- 2021–2022: The Strongest
- 2023–2024: Wilstermann
- 2024–2025: Cienciano
- 2025: Tembetary
- 2025–: Deportivo Madryn
- * Club domestic league appearances and goals

Christian Lionel Díaz (born 12 May 1976) is an Argentine football manager and former player who played as a left back. He is the current manager of Deportivo Madryn.

== Playing career ==
Born in Florencio Varela Partido, Buenos Aires, Díaz started his career with Club Atlético Independiente in 1995. In his first season as a professional, he helped El Diablo Rojo win the South American Supercup in an eventual 2–1 aggregate triumph against Clube de Regatas do Flamengo (he did not take part in the final, however). He appeared in more than 150 official games with the club during his five-year spell.

In 2000, Díaz moved to Italy and joined Udinese Calcio, only missing three Serie A matches as the team finished in 12th position. In the following four years he played in Spain, representing RCD Mallorca, Levante UD, Albacete Balompié, Ciudad de Murcia and UD Almería, having little overall impact and only totalling 14 La Liga appearances for the first and the third sides.

Díaz returned to his country in 2005, successively representing Club Olimpo, Club Atlético Huracán and Arsenal de Sarandí, winning two major titles with the latter team including the 2007 Copa Sudamericana. He retired from football in 2009, at the age of 33.

== Coaching career ==
Díaz began working as a manager in March 2012, after succeeding Ramón Díaz at the helm of Independiente. As an interim, he led the team to a 5–4 away win against Boca Juniors in the same month, ending the opposition's 33-match unbeaten run in national competitions; during his tenure at the Estadio Libertadores de América, he also managed an unprecedented four consecutive home victories as well as a 4–1 defeat of Racing Club de Avellaneda in a local derby, but the club was also relegated to the Primera B Nacional even though he left into the season to be replaced by Américo Gallego.

Subsequently, Díaz had abroad stints at Deportes Iquique (Chile) and Club Deportivo Universidad de San Martín de Porres (Peru): he led the former team to the group stage of the Copa Libertadores for the first time ever, and was appointed at the latter on 17 December 2014.

Díaz returned to his country and its top level in February 2016, joining Olimpo. In spite of the side finishing in last place they avoided relegation on the coefficient rule, and he left his post on 4 December.

On 5 April 2017, Díaz signed for Quilmes Atlético Club, this time not being able to prevent relegation to division two. In late June of the following year, he was appointed at Santa Tecla F.C. from the Salvadoran Primera División.

== Honours ==
=== Player ===
Udinese

- UEFA Intertoto Cup: 2000

Independiente

- Supercopa Sudamericana: 1995

Arsenal Sarandí

- Copa Sudamericana: 2007
- Suruga Bank Championship: 2008
