= C.D. Vaca Díez =

Bolivian football club

Vaca Díez
- Full name: Club Deportivo Vaca Díez
- Nickname(s): Águilas; Chubi Pandino; Albicelestes
- Founded: 19 March 1952; 73 years ago
- Ground: Roberto Jordán Cuéllar
- Capacity: 24,000
- President: Mirlo Rodríguez
- Head coach: Yonny Nay
- League: Copa Simón Bolívar; Primera A APF
- 2023: División Profesional, 16th of 17 (relegated by average)
| Home colours | Away colours |

Club Deportivo Vaca Díez is a Bolivian football club based in Cobija, Pando. The club was founded on 19 March 1952, and competes in the first tier of the Pando Football Association Championship, holding home matches at the Estadio Roberto Jordán Cuéllar, with a capacity of 25,000 people.

== History ==
Founded on 19 March 1952, Vaca Díez played for the first time in a national competition in 2005, after winning their regional league championship in Pando and subsequently qualifying to the Copa Simón Bolívar. The club played in that category in a further seven times, reaching the final in 2022.

On 24 November 2022, Vaca Díez achieved their first-ever promotion to the Primera División, after defeating Libertad Gran Mamoré on penalties.

Vaca Díez participated in the 2023 Bolivian Primera División tournament, but were relegated after finishing the season in the bottom two places of the aggregate table.

== Honours ==
- Copa Simón Bolívar: 2022

== Managers ==
- (Bolivia) Jehanamed Castedo (2011)
- (Bolivia) Yonny Nay (2011)
- (Bolivia) Denis Aramayo (2013)
- (Bolivia) Yonny Nay (2019)
- (Bolivia) Wilson Escalante (2020)
- (Peru) Aristóteles Ramos (2021)
- (Bolivia) Carlos Hurtado (2022)
- (Spain) José Aurelio Gay (2023)
- (Spain) Carlos Fonseca (2023)
- (Brazil) Rodrigo Santana (2023)
- (Bolivia) Yonny Nay (2024–)
