= C.D. Jorge Wilstermann =

Association football club in Bolivia

Jorge Wilstermann
- Full name: Club Cultural y Deportivo Jorge Wilstermann
- Nicknames: Aviador; Rojo; Wilster; Hércules
- Founded: November 24, 1949; 76 years ago
- Ground: Estadio Félix Capriles, Cochabamba, Bolivia
- Capacity: 32,000
- Chairman: Omar Mustafá
- Manager: Edward Zenteno
- League: ACF Primera A
- 2025: División Profesional, 16th of 16 (relegated)
- Website: http://www.wilstermann.com.bo/
Home colours	Away colours	Third colours

Club Cultural y Deportivo Jorge Wilstermann, known simply as Wilstermann, is a Bolivian football club from the city of Cochabamba, founded on 24 November 1949 by a group of workers of Lloyd Aereo Boliviano. It is named after Bolivian aviator Jorge Wilstermann. Wilstermann is one of the three most frequent winners of the Primera Division de Bolivia and the first Bolivian team to qualify to the Copa Libertadores semi-finals.

== History ==
On November 24, 1949, a group of employees of Lloyd Aéreo Boliviano met to form a football club that would be identified with the company and become the pride of its workers. After two hours of debate, they founded the club with the name "San Jose de la Banda" in tribute to the area and the airport in Cochabamba. They proceeded to the election of the board, and appointed Justo Mancilla as club president. After some debate, blue and white were chosen as the team colors.

After the death of the company's first commercial pilot in Bolivia, Jorge Wilstermann, the name of the club was changed. In 1953, Captain Walter Lemma, manager of the company and partner of the deceased, suggested that both the airport and the team bear the name of the pilot, who had been very dear to the institution.

After the club's foundation, the leaders entered it in Cochabamba's Football Association (AFC) to compete in the second division. Wilstermann had no clear rival for first place and its good campaign forced it to seek to move into the AFC championship, which was played in La Paz and Oruro between teams from those cities.

When Dr. Jorge Rojas was appointed Wilstermann's chairman, he changed its colors to red and blue. "I chose those colors because they mean force, ferocity, and total dedication in the field", he stated. It was also the only team in the country which used those colors.

=== Golden ages ===
==== First golden era ====
Wilstermann's first national title came in 1958. This was the first in the club's "golden age", highlighted by star players such as Walter Zamorano, Mario Zabalaga, José Carlos Trigo, César Sánchez, Máximo Alcócer, Ausberto García, Renán López, Alfredo Soria, Rómulo Cortez, Wilfredo Villarroel, José Trujillo, and José Rocabado. At that time, Wilstermann was the only team in Bolivia that played with five forwards, which shattered defenses.

In 1959, Wilstermann repeated as national champions, earning the honor to be the representative Bolivian side in the first edition of the Copa Libertadores de América in 1960. Their initial match pitted them against Peñarol of Uruguay. The Uruguayans defeated Wilstermann 7–1 in Montevideo, although the Bolivians drew their home game 1–1. In 1960, Wilstermann won its third consecutive national title, an achievement that has not been equalled by any other Bolivian club.

In the 1961 Copa competition, Wilster played to a tie against Santa Fe, Colombia, winning 3–2 in Cochabamba and losing 1–0 in Colombia. The governing body decided to draw lots to determine which team would advance to the next round. "The draw was a fraud. After many years we learned that the full intention of the South American Football Confederation, which at that time was based in Bogota, was to eliminate Wilstermann and promote Santa Fe to the semi-finals," claimed then Wilster club chairman, the late Jorge Rojas. The unsubstantiated story was that both of the pieces of paper that were put in the hat had Wilstermann's name. The team that was drawn was eliminated. "The Confederation official of that process confessed that he had been forced to proceed in this manner," recalled Rojas.

==== Second golden era ====
Wilstermann enjoyed a second "golden era" in the 1970s under the chairmanship of Alfredo Salazar. The Wilstermann team again won the national championships in 1972 and 1973. "They were spectacular years. Wilstermann had that mystique of a winning team: they did not like to lose ever, even less to a visiting side. Besides they were always on the attack and even achieved a historic 2–2 tie with River Plate in Buenos Aires," recalls Antonio Yanez, organization leader since 1975.

The Wilstermann sides of this era were highlighted by players such as Rene Bilbao, Hugo Pérez, Jaime Olivera, Juan José Ponce, Limbert Cabrera Rivero, Freddy Vargas, Juan Carlos Sánchez, Hugo Franco, Carlos Canelas, Alberto Navarro, Brazilian Milton Teodoro Joana, and Chileans Juan Abel Ganga and Víctor Hugo Bravo.

==== Third golden era ====
Following a period of club organizational turmoil and the founding of the professional football league of Bolivia, the Liga de Fútbol Profesional Boliviano, Wilstermann enjoyed its third "golden age", winning national titles in 1980 and 1981.

During this period, the team looked to achieve something sought unsuccessfully by many Bolivian football clubs before: qualifying for the second phase of the Copa Libertadores de America. In opening Copa round play, Wilster beat good teams Técnico Universitario, Ambato and Barcelona SC. To seal their qualification for the second round, Wilstermann beat The Strongest 4–1 in the match tiebreaker in a memorable match at the stadium Estadio Ramón Tahuichi Aguilera in Santa Cruz de la Sierra, Bolivia.

In the second phase, Wilstermann faced the formidable rosters of Deportivo Cali of Colombia and Flamengo of Brazil. They first tied the Colombian side 1–1 in Cochabamba, but fell 1–0 in Cali. The team from Rio de Janeiro defeated Wilster 2–1 at home, as well as in Maracanã, 4–1. While these results were disappointing, Wilstermann had accomplished what no Bolivian team had before. The Wilstermann sides of this era were highlighted by players such as Roger Pérez, Carlos Trigo, Víctor Villalón, Carlos Arias, Eduardo Navarro, Jhonny Villarroel, Freddy Vargas, César Enriquez, Jairzinho, Gastón Taborga and Freddy Salguero.

== Honours ==
=== National ===
- Bolivian Primera División
  - Winners (15): 1957, 1958, 1959, 1960, 1967, 1972, 1973, 1980, 1981, 2000, 2006-ST, 2010-A, 2016-C, 2018-A, 2019-C

=== Regional ===
- Primera "A" (AFC)
  - Winners (16): 1957, 1958, 1959, 1960, 1965, 1966, 1967, 1969, 1970, 1972, 1973, 1974, 1975, 1976, 2011, 2011-12

== Record in CONMEBOL competitions ==
- Copa Libertadores: 15 appearances

Best – Semi-finals in 1981

- Copa Sudamericana: 2 appearances

2007 – First round
2014 – First round

- Recopa Sudamericana: 0 appearances
- Copa CONMEBOL: 1 appearance

1998 – Quarter-finals

== Current squad ==
As of 14 August, 2026. Note: Flags indicate national team as defined under FIFA eligibility rules; some limited exceptions apply. Players may hold more than one non-FIFA nationality.

No.	Pos.	Nation	Player
1	GK	BOL	Lucas Salinas
2	DF	BOL	Leonel Pozo
4	DF	BOL	Claudio Ancieta
5	DF	URU	Gonzalo Castillo (captain)
6	MF	BOL	Rodrigo Soto
7	FW	BOL	Israel Rocabado
8	MF	BOL	Alfredo Aliaga
10	MF	ARG	Miguel Escobar
11	MF	BOL	Andy Velasquez
12	GK	BOL	Mateo Olivera
15	MF	BOL	Matias Delgadillo
16	DF	BOL	Pablo Laredo
17	DF	BOL	Oscar Flores
18	DF	BOL	Diego Roca

No.	Pos.	Nation	Player
18	DF	BOL	Diego Roca
19	MF	BOL	Sergio Andia
20	MF	BOL	Erick Veizaga
22	DF	BOL	Edward Zenteno
23	GK	BOL	Santiago Zotes
24	MF	BOL	Gabriel Montaño
37	MF	BOL	Luis Serrano
38	FW	ARG	Alexander Sosa
39	DF	BOL	Ronald Cuellar
70	FW	COL	Johan Perea
77	FW	ARG	Thomas Monterubbianesi
88	DF	BOL	Alejandro Polo
90	DF	BOL	Josue Vargas
99	FW	BOL	Jhojan Vargas

=== In ===
Note: Flags indicate national team as defined under FIFA eligibility rules; some limited exceptions apply. Players may hold more than one non-FIFA nationality.

No.	Pos.	Nation	Player
-	FW	ARG	Thomas Monterubbianesi (arrives from GV San José)
-	FW	ARG	Alexander Sosa (arrives from Aucas)
-	MF	ARG	Miguel Escobar (arrives from GV San José)
-	FW	COL	Johan Perea (arrives from Patriotas)
-	DF	BOL	Pablo Laredo (arrives from Universitario)

No.	Pos.	Nation	Player
-	DF	BOL	Josue Vargas (arrives from Independiente Petrolero)
-	FW	BOL	Jhojan Vargas (arrives from GV San José)
-	MF	BOL	Luis Serrano (arrives from GV San José)
-	DF	BOL	Alejandro Polo (arrives from San Antonio Bulo Bulo)
-	DF	BOL	Ronald Cuellar (arrives from Real Oruro)

=== Out on loan ===
Note: Flags indicate national team as defined under FIFA eligibility rules; some limited exceptions apply. Players may hold more than one non-FIFA nationality.

No.	Pos.	Nation	Player
3	DF	BOL	Roberto Quiroz (loan to Chaco F.C.)
9	FW	BOL	Aaron Pacheco (loan to Chaco F.C.)

No.	Pos.	Nation	Player
16	MF	BOL	Ian Rodriguez (loan to San Antonio)

== Reserves and academy ==
Note: Flags indicate national team as defined under FIFA eligibility rules; some limited exceptions apply. Players may hold more than one non-FIFA nationality.

No.	Pos.	Nation	Player
13	DF	BOL	Andres Huanca ^{U19}
14	DF	BOL	Jesus Cesari ^{U19}
21	GK	BOL	Leonel Urquieta ^{U20}
25	MF	BOL	Jhojan Zenteno ^{U18}
26	MF	BOL	Javier Camacho ^{U17}
27	MF	BOL	Eliel Quino ^{U18}
28	MF	BOL	Axel Mendoza ^{U16}

No.	Pos.	Nation	Player
29	MF	BOL	Diego Flores ^{U18}
30	MF	BOL	Ezequiel Ocampo ^{U17}
31	MF	BOL	Sebastián Flores ^{U19}
32	MF	BOL	Derick Panozo ^{U16}
33	MF	BOL	Benjamin Valdez ^{U17}
35	DF	BOL	Shavi Lizarazu ^{U16}
36	DF	BOL	Andrés Padilla ^{U16}

== Coaching staff ==
Position	Staff
Manager	(Bolivia) Edward Zenteno
Assistant First Team Coach	(Bolivia) Lucio Hinojosa
First Team Fitness Coach	(Bolivia) Fabricio Jaureguizar
Goalkeeper Coach	(Bolivia) Edwin Guardia
Medical Director	(Bolivia) Luis Montaño
Medical Team	(Bolivia) Antonio Valdivia
Medical Team	(Bolivia) Raúl Garcia

== Managers ==
- (Chile) Jorge Venegas (1986)
- (Argentina) Rubén Darío Insúa (Jan 1, 1997–June 30, 1997)
- (Argentina) Dalcio Giovagnoli (1998)
- (Argentina) Jorge Habegger (July 1, 1999 – June 30, 2000)
- (Argentina) Dalcio Giovagnoli (2002–03)
- (Argentina) Luis Manuel Blanco (2004)
- (Bolivia) Mauricio Soria (July 1, 2006 – April 9, 2007)
- (Argentina) Rubén Darío Insúa (Jan 1, 2007 – June 30, 2007)
- (Bolivia) Mauricio Soria (April 16, 2008 – April 21, 2009)
- (Bolivia) Eduardo Villegas (Jan 1, 2009 – Oct 30, 2009)
- (Argentina) Marcelo Neveleff (Jan 14, 2011 – April 16, 2012)
- (Argentina) Claudio Chacior (April 2011 – April 12)
- (Bolivia) Mauricio Soria (May 2012 – Dec 12)
- (Argentina) Victor Hugo Andrada (Jan 1, 2013 – Sept 30, 2013)
- (Argentina) Néstor Clausen (July 1, 2013 – Dec 31, 2013)
- (Bolivia) Marcelo Carballo (Dec 2013)
- (Spain) Manuel Alfaro (Jan 1, 2014 – March 25, 2014)
- (Bolivia) Marcelo Carballo (March 26, 2013 – May 25, 2014)
- (Bolivia) Julio César Baldivieso (June 3, 2014 – Dec 21, 2014)
- (Argentina) Juan Manuel Llop (Jan 5, 2015 – Dec 23, 2015)
- (Argentina) Julio Alberto Zamora (Jan 2, 2016 – Dec 06, 2016)
- (Peru) Roberto Mosquera (Jan 5, 2017 – Nov 6, 2017)
- (Bolivia) Álvaro Peña (Nov 10, 2017 – Dic 19, 2018)
- (Spain) Miguel Angel Portugal (Jan 2, 2019 – April 21, 2019)
- (Argentina) Christian Díaz (Jun 2, 2019 – Jan 1, 2021)
- (Bolivia) Mauricio Soria (Jan 4, 2021 – April 26, 2021)
- (Argentina) Diego Cagna (April 29, 2021 – Sep 24, 2021)
- (Chile) Miguel Ponce (Jan 3, 2022 – April 16, 2022)
- (Bolivia) Álvaro Peña (June 7, 2022 – August 4, 2022)
- (Bolivia) Alberto Illanes (August 8, 2022 – January 3, 2023)
- (Argentina) Andrés Marinangeli (January 5, 2023 – January 23, 2023)
- (Argentina) Christian Díaz (2023–2024)
- (Argentina) Gastón Ramondino (2024)
- (Bolivia) Eduardo Villegas (2024)
- (Argentina) Luciano Theiler (2025)
- (Argentina) Cristian Chávez (April 29, 2025 - August 5, 2025)
- (Bolivia) Humberto Viviani (August 6, 2025 - Dic 19, 2025)
- (Bolivia) Edward Zenteno (March 1, 2026 - present)
