= C.D. Real Tomayapo =

Bolivian football club

Real Tomayapo
- Full name: Club Deportivo Real Tomayapo
- Nicknames: Verdiblanco; Verdolaga
- Founded: 2 February 1999; 27 years ago
- Ground: Estadio IV Centenario; Tarija, Bolivia
- Capacity: 15,000
- Chairman: Edman Soliz
- Manager: Juan Cortés
- League: División Profesional
- 2025: División Profesional, 11th of 16
Home colours	Away colours	Third colours

Club Deportivo Real Tomayapo, best known as Real Tomayapo, is a Bolivian football club based in Tarija. Founded in 1999, it plays in the Bolivian División Profesional after being promoted for the 2021 season by winning the Copa Simón Bolívar the previous season.

== History ==
The club was founded on 2 February 1999, representing the Eustaquio Méndez Province of the Bolivian department of Tarija. It is named after a village located 50 kilometres away from the city of Tarija and known for its peach production. The club was entered into an amateur local league shortly after its foundation.

Having started in the amateur Liga Gremial Obrera, Real Tomayapo managed to make its way to the second tier of the regional league (Primera B), finishing in fourth place with 21 points in 14 matches in its first participation in 2013. The club eventually earned promotion to the Primera A at the end of the 2014–15 season, beating Independiente de Tarija in a double-legged play-off.

In its first years in Primera A, Real Tomayapo established itself as a mid-table club until the 2019 season, when they won their first title in the competition, beating Avilés Industrial on the last matchday to claim the 2019 Apertura championship. The title in the Primera A of the Tarija Football Association (ATF) qualified the club for the 2019 Copa Simón Bolívar, Bolivia's second-tier competition, in which they made it to the semi-finals where they were defeated by Real Santa Cruz.

Parallel to their participation in the Copa Simón Bolívar, Real Tomayapo also played the 2019 Clausura tournament of the ATF Primera A, in which they ended as runners-up behind Atlético Bermejo and qualified for the 2020 Copa Simón Bolívar. In the first stage of that competition, the club topped a group containing fellow Tarija representatives Atlético Bermejo, García Agreda, and Quebracho, beating Bermejo twice, drawing twice against García Agreda and winning one match and losing the remaining one against Quebracho. In the second round, Real Tomayapo faced the runners-up from Chuquisaca, Fancesa, whom they beat on penalty kicks but nevertheless also advanced as lucky loser. The club knocked out EM Huanuni and Cochabamba F.C. in subsequent rounds before facing Fancesa again in the semi-finals. The first leg, played in Sucre ended with Fancesa winning 3–1 and needing only a draw in the second leg in Tarija in order to advance to the final and clinch promotion to the División Profesional. Real Tomayapo managed to win the rematch by a 2–1 score with a late goal and push the definition to a penalty shoot-out, which they won by a 5–3 score in order to secure their first promotion to the top flight of Bolivian football as well as qualification for the final. In the final, Real Tomayapo faced Independiente Petrolero, who had also clinched promotion after beating Vaca Díez in the other semi-final tie. After Independiente won the first leg in Tarija, Real Tomayapo had to win the second leg in Sucre in order to force a penalty shoot-out to decide the title. Real were able to win the rematch with another late goal, and with the ensuing shoot-out ending 4–3 for the side from Tarija, they became the champions of the Copa Simón Bolívar.

== Current squad ==
As of 1 September 2026

Note: Flags indicate national team as defined under FIFA eligibility rules; some limited exceptions apply. Players may hold more than one non-FIFA nationality.

No.	Pos.	Nation	Player
1	GK	BOL	Germán Arauz
2	MF	ARG	Leandro Vera
4	DF	BOL	Gonzalo Vaca
5	DF	ARG	Leonardo Corulo
6	MF	BOL	Rai Lima
7	MF	VEN	Mijaíl Avilés
8	MF	BOL	Josué Mamani
9	FW	VEN	Danny Pérez
11	MF	BOL	Layonel Figueroa
12	MF	BOL	Mirko Tomianovic
14	MF	BOL	Diego Wayar
15	DF	BOL	Juan Orellana
16	DF	BOL	Ronny Montero
17	DF	BOL	Marvin Bejarano
18	FW	COL	Diego Perea
19	FW	BOL	Denis Pinto

No.	Pos.	Nation	Player
20	DF	BOL	Fernando Aguilar
21	MF	BOL	Limberg Gutiérrez
22	MF	BOL	Denilzon Ramallo
23	DF	BOL	Lázaro Crescencio
24	MF	BOL	Samuel Sandoval
25	GK	BOL	Alex Arancibia
28	FW	COL	Andrés Córdoba
30	MF	BOL	Joshua Montaño
31	MF	BOL	Mario Barbery
32	DF	BOL	Rivaldo Méndez
33	DF	BOL	Kevin Mamani
34	DF	BOL	Ronald Sagredo
35	MF	BOL	Josue Castillo
37	MF	BOL	Jonathan Yarvi
48	DF	BOL	Daniel Torrez
55	MF	ARG	Francisco Gatti

=== Out on loan ===
Note: Flags indicate national team as defined under FIFA eligibility rules; some limited exceptions apply. Players may hold more than one non-FIFA nationality.

No. / Pos. / Nation / Player; — / MF / BOL / Santiago Cuiza (at Kryvbas Kryvyi Rih until 30 June 2027)	No. / Pos. / Nation / Player

== Honours ==
=== Domestic ===
- Copa Simón Bolívar
  - Winners (1): 2020
- ATF Primera A
  - Winners (1): 2019-A
  - Runners-up (1): 2019-C
