= 2021 FBF División Profesional =

División Profesional
- Season: 2021
- Dates: 9 March – 12 December 2021
- Champions: Independiente Petrolero (1st title)
- Relegated: Real Potosí; San José
- Copa Libertadores: Independiente Petrolero; Always Ready; The Strongest; Bolívar
- Copa Sudamericana: Royal Pari; Oriente Petrolero; Jorge Wilstermann; Guabirá
- Matches: 239
- Goals: 734 (3.07 per match)
- Top goalscorer: Martín Prost (18 goals)
- Biggest home win: The Strongest 7–0 Nacional Potosí (18 August)
- Biggest away win: Aurora 0–8 Royal Pari (11 March)
- Highest scoring: Indep. Petrolero 5–4 Wilstermann (25 April)

The 2021 FBF División Profesional, known as the 2021 Copa Tigo for sponsorship reasons, was the 44th season of the División Profesional del Fútbol Boliviano, Bolivia's top-flight football league and the fourth season under División de Fútbol Profesional management. The season began on 9 March and ended on 12 December 2021.

Independiente Petrolero won their first league title following a 3–2 win over Guabirá and a 1–0 loss for The Strongest against Real Santa Cruz on the last day of the season. Always Ready were the defending champions, having won the 2020 Apertura tournament.

== Format ==
The format for the 2021 season was approved by the 16 División Profesional clubs on 17 February 2021. Given the need to allow clubs qualified for the Copa Libertadores and Copa Sudamericana as well as the national team to fulfill their international commitments, and concerns by the development of the COVID-19 pandemic, it was decided to play a single tournament in the year instead of the usual Apertura and Clausura system. The 16 teams played each other twice in a double round-robin tournament for a total of 30 rounds. The Bolivian Football Federation originally proposed 13 March 2021 as the date to start the competition, but per request from the four clubs that took part in the Copa Sudamericana the date was moved forward to 10 March 2021. The top four clubs at the end of the season qualified for the 2022 Copa Libertadores, with the champions and runners-up entering the group stage, while the next four best-placed teams qualified for the 2022 Copa Sudamericana.

== Teams ==
16 teams competed in the league for the 2021 season, increasing from 14 since no clubs were relegated at the end of the previous season. Real Tomayapo and Independiente Petrolero, the 2020 Copa Simón Bolívar champions and runners-up, were both promoted for this season. The former competed for the first time in the top tier, while the latter returned after a 17-year absence.

=== Stadia and locations ===
Locations of the 2021 División Profesional teams.

Team	Manager	City	Stadium	Capacity
Always Ready	(Paraguay) Pablo Godoy	El Alto	Municipal de Villa Ingenio	25,000
Atlético Palmaflor	(Bolivia) Humberto Viviani	Quillacollo	Municipal de Quillacollo	6,000
Aurora	(Bolivia) Sergio Zeballos (caretaker)	Cochabamba	Félix Capriles	32,000
Blooming	(Chile) Rodrigo Venegas	Santa Cruz	Ramón Tahuichi Aguilera	38,000
Bolívar	(Brazil) Antônio Carlos Zago	La Paz	Hernando Siles	42,000
Guabirá	(Bolivia) Víctor Hugo Antelo	Montero	Gilberto Parada	13,000
Independiente Petrolero	(Argentina) Marcelo Robledo	Sucre	Olímpico Patria	30,700
Jorge Wilstermann	(Uruguay) Sergio Migliaccio	Cochabamba	Félix Capriles	32,000
Nacional Potosí	(Bolivia) Roberto Mancilla (caretaker)	Potosí	Víctor Agustín Ugarte	32,105
Oriente Petrolero	(Bolivia) Erwin Sánchez	Santa Cruz	Ramón Tahuichi Aguilera	38,000
Real Potosí	(Chile) Sebastián Núñez	Potosí	Víctor Agustín Ugarte	32,105
Real Santa Cruz	(Spain) David Perdiguero	Santa Cruz	Real Santa Cruz	14,000
Real Tomayapo	(Bolivia) Álvaro Peña	Tarija	IV Centenario	15,000
Royal Pari	(Spain) Miguel Ángel Portugal	Santa Cruz	Ramón Tahuichi Aguilera	38,000
San José	(Bolivia) Luis Choque (caretaker)	Oruro	Jesús Bermúdez	33,795
The Strongest	(Argentina) Christian Díaz	La Paz	Hernando Siles	42,000

=== Managerial changes ===
Team	Outgoing manager	Manner of departure	Date of vacancy	Position in table	Incoming manager	Date of appointment
Always Ready	(Argentina) Omar Asad	No contract signed	31 December 2020	Pre-season	(Chile) Sebastián Núñez	18 January 2021
Atlético Palmaflor	(Spain) Xabier Azkargorta	End of contract	31 December 2020	Pre-season	(Bolivia) Julio César Baldivieso	7 January 2021
Real Potosí	(Argentina) Cristian Aldirico	End of contract	31 December 2020	Pre-season	(Spain) Alex Pallarés	5 January 2021
Real Santa Cruz	(Bolivia) José Peña	End of contract	31 December 2020	Pre-season	(Argentina) Néstor Clausen	6 January 2021
Aurora	(Bolivia) Sergio Zeballos	End of caretaker spell	31 December 2020	Pre-season	(Bolivia) Humberto Viviani	1 January 2021
Royal Pari	(Argentina) Miguel Ángel Abrigo	End of caretaker spell	31 December 2020	Pre-season	(Argentina) Christian Díaz	10 January 2021
San José	(Argentina) Arnaldo Mancilla	Replaced	31 December 2020	Pre-season	(Argentina) Domingo Sánchez	18 January 2021
Jorge Wilstermann	(Argentina) Christian Díaz	Sacked	1 January 2021	Pre-season	(Bolivia) Mauricio Soria	4 January 2021
Blooming	(Argentina) Gabriel Schürrer	Sacked	4 January 2021	Pre-season	(Bolivia) Eduardo Villegas	5 January 2021
Nacional Potosí	(Chile) Sebastián Núñez	Signed by Always Ready	8 January 2021	Pre-season	(Bolivia) Álvaro Peña	11 January 2021
Real Potosí	(Spain) Alex Pallarés	Health issues	8 February 2021	Pre-season	(Spain) Carlos Fonseca	9 February 2021
San José	(Argentina) Domingo Sánchez	Sacked	1 March 2021	Pre-season	(Brazil) Thiago Leitão	2 March 2021
San José	(Brazil) Thiago Leitão	Resigned	29 March 2021	16th	(Bolivia) Manuel Luizaga (caretaker)	30 March 2021
Atlético Palmaflor	(Bolivia) Julio César Baldivieso	Sacked	29 March 2021	4th	(Brazil) Thiago Leitão	30 March 2021
San José	(Bolivia) Manuel Luizaga	End of caretaker spell	6 April 2021	16th	(Bolivia) Marcos Ferrufino	6 April 2021
Nacional Potosí	(Bolivia) Álvaro Peña	Sacked	8 April 2021	6th	(Argentina) Flavio Robatto	13 April 2021
Always Ready	(Chile) Sebastián Núñez	Sacked	10 April 2021	3rd	(Argentina) Omar Asad	13 April 2021
The Strongest	(Bolivia) Alberto Illanes	Sacked	22 April 2021	2nd	(Bolivia) Luis Orozco (caretaker)	22 April 2021
Jorge Wilstermann	(Bolivia) Mauricio Soria	Resigned	25 April 2021	14th	(Bolivia) Marco Sandy (caretaker)	26 April 2021
The Strongest	(Bolivia) Luis Orozco	End of caretaker spell	26 April 2021	1st	(Paraguay) Gustavo Florentín	26 April 2021
Jorge Wilstermann	(Bolivia) Marco Sandy	End of caretaker spell	29 April 2021	14th	(Argentina) Diego Cagna	28 April 2021
Real Potosí	(Spain) Carlos Fonseca	Sacked	12 May 2021	15th	(Bolivia) Armando Ibáñez	13 May 2021
San José	(Bolivia) Marcos Ferrufino	Sacked	16 May 2021	16th	(Argentina) Domingo Sánchez	17 May 2021
Bolívar	(Spain) Natxo González	Sacked	23 May 2021	2nd	(Bolivia) Vladimir Soria (caretaker)	23 May 2021
Bolívar	(Bolivia) Vladimir Soria	End of caretaker spell	14 July 2021	2nd	(Brazil) Antônio Carlos Zago	14 July 2021
Real Santa Cruz	(Argentina) Néstor Clausen	Resigned	21 July 2021	14th	(Spain) David Perdiguero	22 July 2021
Always Ready	(Argentina) Omar Asad	Sacked	27 July 2021	8th	(Paraguay) Pablo Godoy	29 July 2021
Royal Pari	(Argentina) Christian Díaz	Sacked	27 July 2021	5th	(Bolivia) Luis Marín Camacho (caretaker)	28 July 2021
Real Potosí	(Bolivia) Armando Ibáñez	Sacked	30 July 2021	15th	(Bolivia) Marco Sandy	2 August 2021
Royal Pari	(Bolivia) Luis Marín Camacho	End of caretaker spell	3 August 2021	5th	(Spain) Miguel Ángel Portugal	3 August 2021
Nacional Potosí	(Argentina) Flavio Robatto	Sacked	4 August 2021	6th	(Bolivia) Alberto Illanes	6 August 2021
Real Tomayapo	(Bolivia) Horacio Pacheco	Resigned	8 August 2021	12th	(Bolivia) Álvaro Peña	10 August 2021
The Strongest	(Paraguay) Gustavo Florentín	Resigned	15 August 2021	1st	(Bolivia) Pablo Cabanillas (caretaker)	15 August 2021
Blooming	(Bolivia) Eduardo Villegas	Mutual consent	19 August 2021	14th	(Argentina) Hernán Meske (Note: Originally as caretaker manager, appointed as manager until the end of the tournament on 7 September 2021.)	19 August 2021
San José	(Argentina) Domingo Sánchez	Resigned	21 August 2021	16th	(Bolivia) Óscar Daza	26 August 2021
The Strongest	(Bolivia) Pablo Cabanillas	End of caretaker spell	21 August 2021	1st	(Argentina) Christian Díaz	19 August 2021
Guabirá	(Argentina) Víctor Hugo Andrada	Sacked	23 August 2021	10th	(Bolivia) Víctor Hugo Antelo	25 August 2021
San José	(Bolivia) Óscar Daza	Sacked	14 September 2021	16th	(Bolivia) Luis Choque (caretaker)	16 September 2021
Atlético Palmaflor	(Brazil) Thiago Leitão	Sacked	15 September 2021	7th	(Argentina) Víctor Hugo Andrada	15 September 2021
Real Potosí	(Bolivia) Marco Sandy	Sacked	18 September 2021	15th	(Bolivia) Ronald Villafuerte (caretaker)	18 September 2021
Jorge Wilstermann	(Argentina) Diego Cagna	Resigned	23 September 2021	9th	(Uruguay) Sergio Migliaccio (Note: Originally as caretaker manager, appointed as manager on a permanent basis on 29 September 2021.)	24 September 2021
Real Potosí	(Bolivia) Ronald Villafuerte	End of caretaker spell	29 September 2021	15th	(Chile) Sebastián Núñez	29 September 2021
Aurora	(Bolivia) Humberto Viviani	Resigned	17 October 2021	12th	(Bolivia) Sergio Zeballos (Note: Caretaker manager until the end of the tournament.)	18 October 2021
Atlético Palmaflor	(Argentina) Víctor Hugo Andrada	Resigned	1 November 2021	9th	(Bolivia) Humberto Viviani	3 November 2021
Nacional Potosí	(Bolivia) Alberto Illanes	Resigned	23 November 2021	11th	(Bolivia) Roberto Mancilla	23 November 2021
Blooming	(Argentina) Hernán Meske	Resigned	27 November 2021	15th	(Chile) Rodrigo Venegas	28 November 2021

== Standings ==
Pos	Team	Pld	W	D	L	GF	GA	GD	Pts	Qualification or relegation
1	Independiente Petrolero (C)	30	20	5	5	59	33	+26	65	Qualification for Copa Libertadores group stage
2	Always Ready	30	19	7	4	66	31	+35	64	Qualification for Copa Libertadores group stage
3	The Strongest	30	19	6	5	57	24	+33	63	Qualification for Copa Libertadores second stage
4	Bolívar	30	16	8	6	63	29	+34	56	Qualification for Copa Libertadores first stage
5	Royal Pari	30	16	3	11	66	45	+21	51	Qualification for Copa Sudamericana first stage
6	Oriente Petrolero	30	15	6	9	46	29	+17	51	Qualification for Copa Sudamericana first stage
7	Jorge Wilstermann	30	15	4	11	64	48	+16	49	Qualification for Copa Sudamericana first stage
8	Guabirá	30	13	5	12	47	47	0	44	Qualification for Copa Sudamericana first stage
9	Atlético Palmaflor	30	11	7	12	42	45	−3	40	
10	Nacional Potosí	30	10	9	11	45	46	−1	39	
11	Real Santa Cruz	30	11	5	14	39	47	−8	38	
12	Aurora	30	9	6	15	40	51	−11	33	
13	Real Tomayapo	30	9	5	16	28	45	−17	32	
14	Blooming	30	7	5	18	34	56	−22	26	
15	Real Potosí (R)	30	7	4	19	30	63	−33	25	Qualification for Relegation play-off
16	San José (Note: San José were deducted twelve points as punishment for failing to pay outstanding debts with former players and managers.) (R)	30	0	1	29	9	96	−87	−11	Administrative relegation to Bolivian Football Regional Leagues (Note: San José were administratively relegated on 8 December 2021 per ruling by the Bolivian Football Federation's Superior Court of Appeals due to their failure to pay outstanding debts.)

Source: FBF, Soccerway
Rules for classification: 1) Points, 2) Playoff game (only if needed to decide championship between two teams), 3) Goal difference, 4) Goals for, 5) Away goals for, 6) Drawing of lots.
(C) Champions; (R) Relegated

== Results ==
Home \ Away	CAR	APF	AUR	BLO	BOL	GUA	IPE	WIL	NAC	OPE	RPO	RSC	RTO	RPA	SJO	STR
Always Ready	—	3–2	2–0	5–1	1–1	6–1	2–2	0–0	1–1	2–0	2–1	4–0	3–1	2–1	5–0	2–1
Atlético Palmaflor	0–1	—	3–2	3–0	2–2	2–1	0–0	3–1	0–0	2–1	0–1	1–0	2–0	2–0	1–0	0–0
Aurora	3–4	2–1	—	2–0	1–1	2–1	3–0	1–1	0–0	1–2	5–0	4–1	1–2	0–8	3–0	0–1
Blooming	1–2	1–1	1–0	—	2–2	0–1	2–2	2–2	2–1	1–1	1–0	3–1	0–1	0–1	4–0	2–0
Bolívar	0–2	3–1	5–1	2–0	—	6–0	1–0	4–0	4–2	1–1	1–0	1–1	2–0	2–0	4–1	0–1
Guabirá	0–0	2–0	4–0	4–2	3–1	—	2–3	3–2	3–2	1–1	3–0	1–0	0–2	3–2	4–0	0–0
Independiente Petrolero	1–2	2–0	3–0	3–0	2–1	2–1	—	5–4	2–0	1–0	2–1	2–1	1–0	1–0	4–0	2–2
Jorge Wilstermann	5–2	5–0	2–1	2–1	1–0	2–1	2–3	—	1–2	0–1	3–1	5–1	3–0	4–1	4–0	0–3
Nacional Potosí	0–2	3–2	0–0	4–0	1–1	2–1	1–2	0–1	—	1–0	4–2	2–2	0–0	2–1	7–1	3–4
Oriente Petrolero	0–0	3–0	1–0	3–0	1–3	2–0	1–2	4–2	0–0	—	2–0	2–0	3–1	2–4	4–0	2–0
Real Potosí	3–2	1–5	1–1	3–1	0–2	1–3	0–5	2–2	1–2	2–1	—	3–0	1–0	1–3	3–0	1–3
Real Santa Cruz	2–3	1–0	1–1	1–0	0–3	3–0	2–0	0–2	1–1	0–0	4–1	—	2–0	2–1	5–0	1–0
Real Tomayapo	1–0	3–3	1–2	2–1	1–3	1–1	0–2	1–2	3–0	0–1	0–0	2–1	—	1–4	1–0	0–0
Royal Pari	2–1	2–2	1–0	4–3	1–1	1–1	3–1	3–2	2–0	0–3	5–0	3–2	4–2	—	6–1	0–1
San José	0–4	1–3	1–4	1–2	0–5	0–1	1–3	0–3 (Note: Match cancelled and awarded 3–0 to Jorge Wilstermann due to San José's administrative relegation.)	0–4	0–2	0–0	1–2	1–2	0–3	—	0–1
The Strongest	1–1	4–1	3–0	2–1	3–1	2–1	1–1	3–1	7–0	5–2	1–0	1–2	2–0	3–0 (Note: Match ended after 9 minutes of play due to the withdrawal of Royal Pari player Kevin Rosas by injury, leaving the team below the minimum number of players required per tournament regulations (seven). The score at the time of suspension was 3–0.)	2–0	—

Source: FBF, Soccerway
Legend: Blue = home team win; Yellow = draw; Red = away team win.

== Top scorers ==
Rank	Name	Club	Goals
1	(Argentina) Martín Prost	Independiente Petrolero	18
2	(Bolivia) Carmelo Algarañaz	Always Ready	17
3	(Ecuador) Kevin Mina	Guabirá	16
4	(Argentina) Leonardo Ramos	Bolívar	15
4	(Brazil) Jefferson Tavares	Royal Pari	15
6	(Dominican Republic) Edarlyn Reyes	Real Santa Cruz	14
7	(Colombia) Jair Reinoso	The Strongest	13
8	(Paraguay) Juan Godoy	Independiente Petrolero	12
8	(Uruguay) Sebastián Gularte	Nacional Potosí	12
8	(Brazil) Willie	The Strongest	12

Source: Soccerway

== Relegation/promotion play-off ==
The relegation play-off was played by:

- Real Potosí (2021 División Profesional 15th place)
- Universitario de Sucre (2021 Copa Simón Bolívar runners-up)

The winners played in the top flight for the 2022 season.

15 December 2021
19:00 UTC−4

Real Potosí	1–2	Universitario de Sucre
Lovera 75' (pen.)	Report	Brun 12'; Argüello 51'

Estadio Víctor Agustín Ugarte, Potosí
Referee: Jordy Alemán

19 December 2021
15:00 UTC−4

Universitario de Sucre	2–0	Real Potosí
Gonzales 57'; González 86' (pen.)	Report

Estadio Olímpico Patria, Sucre
Referee: Ivo Méndez

Universitario de Sucre won 6–0 on points and were promoted to Primera División.
