= 2019 Copa Sudamericana first stage =

Stage of the Copa Sudamericana

The 2019 Copa Sudamericana first stage was played from 5 February to 8 May 2019. A total of 44 teams competed in the first stage to decide 22 of the 32 places in the second stage of the 2019 Copa Sudamericana.

== Draw ==
The draw for the first stage was held on 17 December 2018, 20:30 PYST (UTC−3), at the CONMEBOL Convention Centre in Luque, Paraguay. For the first stage, the teams were divided into two pots according to their geographical zones:

- Pot A (South Zone): 22 teams from Argentina, Bolivia, Chile, Paraguay, and Uruguay
- Pot B (North Zone): 22 teams from Brazil, Colombia, Ecuador, Peru, and Venezuela

The 44 teams were drawn into 22 ties (E1–E22) between a team from Pot A and a team from Pot B, with the teams from Pot B hosting the second leg in odd-numbered ties, and the teams from Pot A hosting the second leg in even-numbered ties. This distribution ensured that teams from the same association could not be drawn into the same tie.

First stage draw
Pot A (South Zone)	Pot B (North Zone)
(Argentina) Independiente; (Argentina) Racing; (Argentina) Defensa y Justicia; (Argentina) Unión; (Argentina) Colón; (Argentina) Argentinos Juniors; (Bolivia) Royal Pari; (Bolivia) Oriente Petrolero; (Bolivia) Nacional Potosí; (Bolivia) Guabirá; (Chile) Deportes Antofagasta; (Chile) Colo-Colo; (Chile) Unión La Calera; (Chile) Unión Española; (Paraguay) Sol de América; (Paraguay) Independiente; (Paraguay) Deportivo Santaní; (Paraguay) Guaraní; (Uruguay) Cerro; (Uruguay) Liverpool; (Uruguay) Montevideo Wanderers; (Uruguay) River Plate	(Brazil) Botafogo; (Brazil) Santos; (Brazil) Bahia; (Brazil) Fluminense; (Brazil) Corinthians; (Brazil) Chapecoense; (Colombia) Once Caldas; (Colombia) La Equidad; (Colombia) Rionegro Águilas; (Colombia) Deportivo Cali; (Ecuador) Universidad Católica; (Ecuador) Macará; (Ecuador) Independiente del Valle; (Ecuador) Mushuc Runa; (Peru) Deportivo Municipal; (Peru) Sport Huancayo; (Peru) UTC; (Peru) Binacional; (Venezuela) Zulia; (Venezuela) Mineros de Guayana; (Venezuela) Monagas; (Venezuela) Estudiantes de Mérida

Notes

1. ^{BOL} The identity of the teams Bolivia 1, Bolivia 2 and Bolivia 3 was not known at the time of the draw.

== Format ==
In the first stage, each tie was played on a home-and-away two-legged basis. If tied on aggregate, the away goals rule was used. If still tied, extra time was not played, and a penalty shoot-out was used to determine the winner (Regulations Article 27).

The 22 winners of the first stage advanced to the second stage to join the 10 teams transferred from the Copa Libertadores (two best teams eliminated in the third stage of qualifying and eight third-placed teams in the group stage).

== Matches ==
The first legs were played on 5–7, 12–14, 26 February, 19–21 March and 2–4 April, and the second legs were played on 19–21, 26–28 February, 21 March, 16–18, 30 April, 1–2 and 8 May 2019.

Team 1	Agg.	Team 2	1st leg	2nd leg
Montevideo Wanderers (Uruguay)	3–1	(Peru) Sport Huancayo	2–0	1–1
Bahia (Brazil)	0–1	(Uruguay) Liverpool	0–1	0–0
Independiente (Argentina)	6–2	(Peru) Binacional	4–1	2–1
Rionegro Águilas (Colombia)	2–2 (3–0 p)	(Bolivia) Oriente Petrolero	1–1	1–1
Argentinos Juniors (Argentina)	2–1	(Venezuela) Estudiantes de Mérida	2–0	0–1
Deportivo Municipal (Peru)	0–5	(Argentina) Colón	0–3	0–2
Unión Española (Chile)	2–2 (6–5 p)	(Ecuador) Mushuc Runa	1–1	1–1
UTC (Peru)	2–4	(Uruguay) Cerro	1–1	1–3
Deportivo Santaní (Paraguay)	3–1	(Colombia) Once Caldas	1–1	2–0
Universidad Católica (Ecuador)	1–1 (3–0 p)	(Chile) Colo-Colo	0–1	1–0
River Plate (Uruguay)	1–1 (a)	(Brazil) Santos	0–0	1–1
Macará (Ecuador)	5–1	(Bolivia) Guabirá	2–1	3–0
Royal Pari (Bolivia)	3–3 (4–2 p)	(Venezuela) Monagas	2–1	1–2
Mineros de Guayana (Venezuela)	1–1 (3–4 p)	(Paraguay) Sol de América	1–0	0–1
Unión La Calera (Chile)	1–1 (a)	(Brazil) Chapecoense	0–0	1–1
Deportivo Cali (Colombia)	1–1 (4–1 p)	(Paraguay) Guaraní	1–0	0–1
Nacional Potosí (Bolivia)	1–1 (0–2 p)	(Venezuela) Zulia	0–1	1–0
Corinthians (Brazil)	2–2 (5–4 p)	(Argentina) Racing	1–1	1–1
Independiente (Paraguay)	0–0 (3–4 p)	(Colombia) La Equidad	0–0	0–0
Fluminense (Brazil)	2–1	(Chile) Deportes Antofagasta	0–0	2–1
Unión (Argentina)	2–2 (2–4 p)	(Ecuador) Independiente del Valle	2–0	0–2
Botafogo (Brazil)	4–0	(Argentina) Defensa y Justicia	1–0	3–0

=== Match E1 ===
21 March 2019
19:15 UTC−3

Montevideo Wanderers (Uruguay)	2–0	(Peru) Sport Huancayo
Macaluso 2'; Bravo 6'	Report

Parque Alfredo Víctor Viera, Montevideo
Referee: Felipe González (Chile)

18 April 2019
19:30 UTC−5

Sport Huancayo (Peru)	1–1	(Uruguay) Montevideo Wanderers
Salcedo 46'	Report	Pastorini 77' (pen.)

Estadio Huancayo, Huancayo
Referee: Nicolás Gallo (Colombia)

Montevideo Wanderers won 3–1 on aggregate and advanced to the second stage.

=== Match E2 ===
7 February 2019
18:15 UTC−3

Bahia (Brazil)	0–1	(Uruguay) Liverpool
	Report	Ramírez 80'

Arena Fonte Nova, Salvador
Referee: Jesús Valenzuela (Venezuela)

21 February 2019
19:15 UTC−3

Liverpool (Uruguay)	0–0	(Brazil) Bahia
	Report

Estadio Luis Franzini, Montevideo (Note: Liverpool played their home match at Estadio Luis Franzini, Montevideo, instead of their regular stadium Estadio Belvedere, Montevideo.)
Referee: Gery Vargas (Bolivia)

Liverpool won 1–0 on aggregate and advanced to the second stage.

=== Match E3 ===
3 April 2019
21:30 UTC−3

Independiente (Argentina)	4–1	(Peru) Binacional
Brítez 37'; Pérez 45' (o.g.); Sánchez Miño 47'; Romero 65' (pen.)	Report	Collazos 67'

Estadio Libertadores de América, Avellaneda
Referee: Raphael Claus (Brazil)

1 May 2019
19:30 UTC−5

Binacional (Peru)	1–2	(Argentina) Independiente
Zeta 77'	Report	Hernández 50'; Domínguez 55'

Estadio Monumental de la UNSA, Arequipa (Note: Binacional played their home match at Estadio Monumental de la UNSA, Arequipa, instead of their regular stadium Estadio Guillermo Briceño Rosamedina, Juliaca.)
Referee: Cristian Garay (Chile)

Independiente won 6–2 on aggregate and advanced to the second stage.

=== Match E4 ===
21 March 2019
19:30 UTC−5

Rionegro Águilas (Colombia)	1–1	(Bolivia) Oriente Petrolero
Mugni 80' (o.g.)	Report	Mugni 12'

Estadio Alberto Grisales, Rionegro
Referee: Darío Herrera (Argentina)

17 April 2019
20:30 UTC−4

Oriente Petrolero (Bolivia)	1–1	(Colombia) Rionegro Águilas
Castillo 32'	Report	Obrian 38'
Penalties
Castillo (penalty missed); Sperduti (penalty missed); Mugni (penalty missed)	0–3	(penalty missed) Ramírez; (penalty scored) Obrian; (penalty scored) Escobar; (penalty scored) Gómez

Estadio Ramón Tahuichi Aguilera, Santa Cruz de la Sierra
Referee: Joel Alarcón (Peru)

Tied 2–2 on aggregate, Rionegro Águilas won on penalties and advanced to the second stage.

=== Match E5 ===
4 April 2019
19:15 UTC−3

Argentinos Juniors (Argentina)	2–0	(Venezuela) Estudiantes de Mérida
E. Rivas 23' (o.g.); Batallini 76'	Report

Estadio Diego Armando Maradona, Buenos Aires
Referee: Raúl Orosco (Bolivia)

8 May 2019 (Note: The Estudiantes de Mérida v Argentinos Juniors match was originally scheduled for 2 May 2019, 18:15 local time, but was first re-scheduled to 16:00 local time, and later suspended and re-scheduled to 8 May 2019, 16:00 local time due to civil unrest in Venezuela.)
16:00 UTC−4

Estudiantes de Mérida (Venezuela)	1–0	(Argentina) Argentinos Juniors
Mena 20'	Report

Estadio Metropolitano de Mérida, Mérida
Referee: Nicolás Gallo (Colombia)

Argentinos Juniors won 2–1 on aggregate and advanced to the second stage.

=== Match E6 ===
19 March 2019
19:30 UTC−5

Deportivo Municipal (Peru)	0–3	(Argentina) Colón
	Report	Estigarribia 42'; L. Rodríguez 51'; Bernardi 69'

Estadio Nacional, Lima (Note: Deportivo Municipal played their home match at Estadio Nacional, Lima, instead of their regular stadium Estadio Segundo Aranda Torres, Huacho.)
Referee: Bráulio Machado (Brazil)

16 April 2019
21:30 UTC−3

Colón (Argentina)	2–0	(Peru) Deportivo Municipal
Sandoval 40' (pen.), 49'	Report

Estadio Brigadier General Estanislao López, Santa Fe
Referee: Luis Quiroz (Ecuador)

Colón won 5–0 on aggregate and advanced to the second stage.

=== Match E7 ===
19 March 2019
19:15 UTC−3

Unión Española (Chile)	1–1	(Ecuador) Mushuc Runa
Llanos 89'	Report	Rivas 69'

Estadio Santa Laura, Santiago
Referee: Wagner Reway (Brazil)

18 April 2019
19:30 UTC−5

Mushuc Runa (Ecuador)	1–1	(Chile) Unión Española
Rébola 13'	Report	Aja 9'
Penalties
Rébola (penalty scored); Realpe (penalty scored); Fajardo (penalty missed); Mina (penalty scored); George (penalty scored); Medina (penalty scored); Renato (penalty missed)	5–6	(penalty scored) Dávila; (penalty scored) Caballero; (penalty scored) Llanos; (penalty scored) Larenas; (penalty missed) Palomeque; (penalty scored) González; (penalty scored) Sánchez

Estadio Bellavista, Ambato (Note: Mushuc Runa played their home match at Estadio Bellavista, Ambato, instead of their regular stadium Estadio COAC Mushuc Runa, Ambato.)
Referee: Ivo Méndez (Bolivia)

Tied 2–2 on aggregate, Unión Española won on penalties and advanced to the second stage.

=== Match E8 ===
3 April 2019
19:30 UTC−5

UTC (Peru)	1–1	(Uruguay) Cerro
Quintero 38'	Report	Izquierdo 36'

Estadio Mansiche, Trujillo (Note: UTC played their home match at Estadio Mansiche, Trujillo, instead of their regular stadium Estadio Héroes de San Ramón, Cajamarca.)
Referee: Guillermo Guerrero (Ecuador)

30 April 2019
19:15 UTC−3

Cerro (Uruguay)	3–1	(Peru) UTC
Tancredi 21'; Pellejero 41', 74'	Report	Ciucci 70'

Estadio Luis Franzini, Montevideo (Note: Cerro played their home match at Estadio Luis Franzini, Montevideo, instead of their regular stadium Estadio Luis Tróccoli, Montevideo.)
Referee: Ángel Arteaga (Venezuela)

Cerro won 4–2 on aggregate and advanced to the second stage.

=== Match E9 ===
7 February 2019
20:30 UTC−3

Deportivo Santaní (Paraguay)	1–1	(Colombia) Once Caldas
Díaz 37'	Report	J. Rodríguez 67'

Estadio Defensores del Chaco, Asunción (Note: Deportivo Santaní played their home match at Estadio Defensores del Chaco, Asunción, instead of their regular stadium Estadio Juan José Vázquez, San Estanislao.)
Referee: Bráulio Machado (Brazil)

21 February 2019
19:30 UTC−5

Once Caldas (Colombia)	0–2	(Paraguay) Deportivo Santaní
	Report	Aguada 38'; Cazal 90+7'

Estadio Palogrande, Manizales
Referee: Raphael Claus (Brazil)

Deportivo Santaní won 3–1 on aggregate and advanced to the second stage.

=== Match E10 ===
2 April 2019
19:30 UTC−5

Universidad Católica (Ecuador)	0–1	(Chile) Colo-Colo
	Report	Paredes 16'

Estadio Olímpico Atahualpa, Quito
Referee: Wilton Sampaio (Brazil)

30 April 2019
20:30 UTC−4

Colo-Colo (Chile)	0–1	(Ecuador) Universidad Católica
	Report	J. Chalá 37'
Penalties
Paredes (penalty missed); Zaldivia (penalty missed); Parraguez (penalty missed)	0–3	(penalty missed) A. Oña; (penalty scored) De los Santos; (penalty scored) López; (penalty scored) B. Oña

Estadio Monumental David Arellano, Santiago
Referee: Rodolpho Toski (Brazil)

Tied 1–1 on aggregate, Universidad Católica won on penalties and advanced to the second stage.

=== Match E11 ===
12 February 2019
18:15 UTC−3

River Plate (Uruguay)	0–0	(Brazil) Santos
	Report

Estadio Luis Franzini, Montevideo (Note: River Plate played their home match at Estadio Luis Franzini, Montevideo, instead of their regular stadium Parque Federico Omar Saroldi, Montevideo.)
Referee: Germán Delfino (Argentina)

26 February 2019
19:15 UTC−3

Santos (Brazil)	1–1	(Uruguay) River Plate
Soteldo 86'	Report	Da Luz 54'

Estádio do Pacaembu, São Paulo (Note: Santos played their home match at Estádio do Pacaembu, São Paulo, instead of their regular stadium Estádio Urbano Caldeira, Santos.)
Referee: Mauro Vigliano (Argentina)

Tied 1–1 on aggregate, River Plate won on away goals and advanced to the second stage.

=== Match E12 ===
12 February 2019
18:30 UTC−5

Macará (Ecuador)	2–1	(Bolivia) Guabirá
Champang 28'; Arboleda 34'	Report	Mojica 26'

Estadio Bellavista, Ambato
Referee: Rodolpho Toski (Brazil)

28 February 2019
20:30 UTC−4

Guabirá (Bolivia)	0–3	(Ecuador) Macará
	Report	Estrada 69', 71', 77'

Estadio Gilberto Parada, Montero
Referee: Jesús Valenzuela (Venezuela)

Macará won 5–1 on aggregate and advanced to the second stage.

=== Match E13 ===
14 February 2019
17:15 UTC−4 (Note: The Royal Pari v Monagas match was originally scheduled for 14 February 2019, 19:30 local time, but was re-scheduled to 17:15 local time.)

Royal Pari (Bolivia)	2–1	(Venezuela) Monagas
Ribeiro 4'; Milano 45'	Report	Coria 3'

Estadio Ramón Tahuichi Aguilera, Santa Cruz de la Sierra
Referee: Cristian Garay (Chile)

27 February 2019
18:15 UTC−4

Monagas (Venezuela)	2–1	(Bolivia) Royal Pari
Soda 27'; García 90+2'	Report	Mosquera 42'
Penalties
Reyes (penalty missed); González (penalty scored); Hernández (penalty scored); Meza (penalty missed)	2–4	(penalty scored) Mosquera; (penalty missed) Vásquez; (penalty scored) Siles; (penalty scored) Justiniano; (penalty scored) Isita

Estadio Monumental de Maturín, Maturín
Referee: Rodolpho Toski (Brazil)

Tied 3–3 on aggregate, Royal Pari won on penalties and advanced to the second stage.

=== Match E14 ===
2 April 2019
16:00 UTC−4 (Note: The Mineros v Sol de América match was originally scheduled for 2 April 2019, 18:15 local time, but was re-scheduled to 16:00 local time.)

Mineros (Venezuela)	1–0	(Paraguay) Sol de América
Cuero 56'	Report

Polideportivo Cachamay, Ciudad Guayana
Referee: Darío Herrera (Argentina)

1 May 2019
18:15 UTC−4

Sol de América (Paraguay)	1–0	(Venezuela) Mineros
Villagra 74'	Report
Penalties
Clar (penalty scored); Jourdan (penalty scored); Giménez (penalty scored); Villalba (penalty scored)	4–3	(penalty missed) Jiménez; (penalty scored) Rivero; (penalty scored) Flores; (penalty scored) Camargo; (penalty missed) Covea

Estadio Luis Alfonso Giagni, Villa Elisa
Referee: Ivo Méndez (Bolivia)

Tied 1–1 on aggregate, Sol de América won on penalties and advanced to the second stage.

=== Match E15 ===
5 February 2019
20:30 UTC−3

Unión La Calera (Chile)	0–0	(Brazil) Chapecoense
	Report

Estadio Nicolás Chahuán Nazar, La Calera
Referee: Gustavo Tejera (Uruguay)

19 February 2019
21:30 UTC−3

Chapecoense (Brazil)	1–1	(Chile) Unión La Calera
Everaldo 49'	Report	Bou 20'

Arena Condá, Chapecó
Referee: José Argote (Venezuela)

Tied 1–1 on aggregate, Unión La Calera won on away goals and advanced to the second stage.

=== Match E16 ===
4 April 2019
19:30 UTC−5

Deportivo Cali (Colombia)	1–0	(Paraguay) Guaraní
Velasco 43'	Report

Estadio Deportivo Cali, Palmira
Referee: Diego Haro (Peru)

2 May 2019
20:30 UTC−4

Guaraní (Paraguay)	1–0	(Colombia) Deportivo Cali
Contrera 74'	Report
Penalties
Contrera (penalty missed); Morel (penalty scored); Gamarra (penalty missed)	1–4	(penalty scored) Rivera; (penalty scored) Cabrera; (penalty scored) Dinenno; (penalty scored) Angulo

Estadio Defensores del Chaco, Asunción (Note: Guaraní played their home match at Estadio Defensores del Chaco, Asunción, instead of their regular stadium Estadio Rogelio Livieres, Asunción.)
Referee: Facundo Tello (Argentina)

Tied 1–1 on aggregate, Deportivo Cali won on penalties and advanced to the second stage.

=== Match E17 ===
19 March 2019
20:30 UTC−4

Nacional Potosí (Bolivia)	0–1	(Venezuela) Zulia
	Report	Moya 90+1'

Estadio Víctor Agustín Ugarte, Potosí
Referee: Guillermo Guerrero (Ecuador)

16 April 2019
16:00 UTC−4 (Note: The Zulia v Nacional Potosí match was originally scheduled for 16 April 2019, 18:15 local time, but was re-scheduled to 16:00 local time.)

Zulia (Venezuela)	0–1	(Bolivia) Nacional Potosí
	Report	Castellón 37'
Penalties
Moya (penalty scored); Castilla (penalty missed); J.A. Martínez (penalty scored); Celis (penalty missed)	2–0	(penalty missed) Rioja; (penalty missed) Pascua; (penalty missed) Castellón; (penalty missed) Salazar

Estadio José Pachencho Romero, Maracaibo
Referee: Juan Gabriel Benítez (Paraguay)

Tied 1–1 on aggregate, Zulia won on penalties and advanced to the second stage.

=== Match E18 ===
14 February 2019
21:30 UTC−2 (Note: The Corinthians v Racing match was originally scheduled for 14 February 2019, 19:15 local time, but was re-scheduled to 21:30 local time.)

Corinthians (Brazil)	1–1	(Argentina) Racing
Gustavo 88'	Report	Ríos 22'

Arena Corinthians, São Paulo
Referee: Víctor Carrillo (Peru)

27 February 2019
21:30 UTC−3

Racing (Argentina)	1–1	(Brazil) Corinthians
Cristaldo 41'	Report	Vágner Love 50'
Penalties
Cvitanich (penalty scored); Domínguez (penalty missed); Cristaldo (penalty missed); Fernández (penalty scored); Pillud (penalty scored); Soto (penalty scored); Solari (penalty missed)	4–5	(penalty scored) Gustavo; (penalty scored) Mateus Vital; (penalty missed) Sornoza; (penalty scored) Vágner Love; (penalty missed) Avelar; (penalty scored) Richard; (penalty scored) Fagner

Estadio Presidente Juan Domingo Perón, Avellaneda
Referee: Wilmar Roldán (Colombia)

Tied 2–2 on aggregate, Corinthians won on penalties and advanced to the second stage.

=== Match E19 ===
20 March 2019
21:30 UTC−3

Independiente (Paraguay)	0–0	(Colombia) La Equidad
	Report

Estadio Defensores del Chaco, Asunción (Note: Independiente played their home match at Estadio Defensores del Chaco, Asunción, instead of their regular stadium Estadio Ricardo Gregor, Asunción.)
Referee: Raúl Orosco (Bolivia)

16 April 2019
19:30 UTC−5

La Equidad (Colombia)	0–0	(Paraguay) Independiente
	Report
Penalties
Peralta (penalty scored); Motta (penalty scored); Vargas (penalty missed); Torralvo (penalty missed); Novoa (penalty scored); J. González (penalty scored)	4–3	(penalty missed) Báez; (penalty scored) C.D. Vargas; (penalty missed) Parra; (penalty scored) C.R. Vargas; (penalty scored) Santacruz; (penalty missed) Benítez

Estadio El Campín, Bogotá (Note: La Equidad played their home match at Estadio El Campín, Bogotá, instead of their regular stadium Estadio Metropolitano de Techo, Bogotá.)
Referee: Ángel Arteaga (Venezuela)

Tied 0–0 on aggregate, La Equidad won on penalties and advanced to the second stage.

=== Match E20 ===
26 February 2019 (Note: The Fluminense v Deportes Antofagasta match was originally scheduled for 13 February 2019, 21:30 local time, but was re-scheduled to 26 February 2019 per request from the Brazilian Football Confederation.)
21:30 UTC−3

Fluminense (Brazil)	0–0	(Chile) Deportes Antofagasta
	Report

Estádio do Maracanã, Rio de Janeiro
Referee: Arnaldo Samaniego (Paraguay)

21 March 2019 (Note: The Deportes Antofagasta v Fluminense match was originally scheduled for 26 February 2019, 21:30 local time, but was re-scheduled to 21 March 2019, 19:15 local time per request from the Brazilian Football Confederation.)
19:15 UTC−3

Deportes Antofagasta (Chile)	1–2	(Brazil) Fluminense
J. Flores 25'	Report	Everaldo 17'; Luciano 68'

Estadio Regional Calvo y Bascuñán, Antofagasta
Referee: Wilmar Roldán (Colombia)

Fluminense won 2–1 on aggregate and advanced to the second stage.

=== Match E21 ===
20 March 2019
21:30 UTC−3

Unión (Argentina)	2–0	(Ecuador) Independiente del Valle
Mazzola 21'; Lotti 90+3'	Report

Estadio 15 de Abril, Santa Fe
Referee: Gustavo Murillo (Colombia)

17 April 2019
19:30 UTC−5

Independiente del Valle (Ecuador)	2–0	(Argentina) Unión
Cabeza 7'; Gómez 55' (o.g.)	Report
Penalties
Mera (penalty scored); Pellerano (penalty scored); Dájome (penalty scored); Ayala (penalty scored)	4–2	(penalty scored) Mazzola; (penalty scored) M. Pittón; (penalty missed) Cuadra; (penalty missed) Bottinelli

Estadio Olímpico Atahualpa, Quito (Note: Independiente del Valle played their home match at Estadio Olímpico Atahualpa, Quito, instead of their regular stadium Estadio Rumiñahui, Sangolquí.)
Referee: Cristian Garay (Chile)

Tied 2–2 on aggregate, Independiente del Valle won on penalties and advanced to the second stage.

=== Match E22 ===
6 February 2019
21:30 UTC−2

Botafogo (Brazil)	1–0	(Argentina) Defensa y Justicia
Erik 90+3'	Report

Estádio Olímpico Nilton Santos, Rio de Janeiro
Referee: Esteban Ostojich (Uruguay)

20 February 2019
21:30 UTC−3

Defensa y Justicia (Argentina)	0–3	(Brazil) Botafogo
	Report	Erik 52', 74' (pen.); Alex Santana 80'

Estadio Norberto Tomaghello, Gobernador Costa
Referee: Diego Haro (Peru)

Botafogo won 4–0 on aggregate and advanced to the second stage.
