= João Paulo Barros =

Brazilian football manager (born 1984)

Personal information
- Full name: João Paulo de Barros Manoel
- Date of birth: 19 January 1987 (age 39)
- Place of birth: Rincão, Brazil

Youth career
- Years: Team
- Rio Claro
- XV de Piracicaba
- Palmeirinha

Managerial career
- 2013: Paulistinha (assistant)
- 2013: Rio Claro U15
- 2014: Ituiutabano (assistant)
- 2014: Ituiutabano (interim)
- 2014: Goiatuba U17
- 2015: Destroyers U19
- 2016: Virginia
- 2017: Equipegol (youth)
- 2018: Destroyers (reserves)
- 2019: JMP Soccer School U17
- 2019: Aurora (assistant)
- 2019: Proyecto Bolivia 2022 U14
- 2020: Virginia
- 2021: Universitario de Sucre
- 2021: San José (assistant)
- 2021: Atlético Palmaflor (assistant)
- 2021: Always Ready (assistant)
- 2022: GV San José
- 2022: Real Tomayapo (reserve)
- 2023: Los Almendros
- 2023–2024: San Antonio Bulo Bulo (assistant)
- 2024: Royal Pari (assistant)
- 2025: ABB (assistant)
- 2025: ABB

João Paulo de Barros Manoel (born 19 January 1987) is a Brazilian football coach.

== Career ==
Born in Rincão, São Paulo, Barros played for local sides as a youth before retiring due to a knee injury, and began his coaching career as an assistant at Paulistinha. He later coached the under-15 squad of Rio Claro, before moving to Ituiutabano in 2014, where he was an assistant and interim head coach.

In 2015, after a spell at the under-17 team of Goiatuba, Barros moved to Bolivia and joined Destroyers as an under-19 manager. He would later work as a first team manager of Virginia in the following year, and managed other youth sides before joining the staff of Thiago Leitão at Aurora in 2019, as an assistant.

On 5 February 2021, Barros was appointed manager of Universitario de Sucre. On 3 March, however, he left the side to join Leitão's staff at Club San José.

Barros followed Leitão to Atlético Palmaflor, and later became an assistant of Pablo Godoy at Always Ready before returning to managerial duties in March 2022, with GV San José. He would later manage the reserve side of Real Tomayapo and the first team of Los Almendros, before again becoming an assistant of Leitão at San Antonio Bulo Bulo.

Barros worked as an assistant of Leitão at Royal Pari in 2024, and as an assistant of Godoy at ABB in the following year. On 18 July 2025, he was appointed manager of the latter after Godoy resigned, but was himself dismissed on 25 August.
