= Daza (surname) =

Daza is a surname. Notable people and characters with the surname include:

- Camilo Daza (1898–1975), Colombian aviator
  - Camilo Daza International Airport in Colombia
- Esteban Daza (c. 1537–1590s), Spanish composer and vihuelist
- Eugenio Daza (1870–1954), Filipino nobleman
- Fermina Daza, one of the protagonists in Love in the Time of Cholera
- Gabriel Daza (1896–1994), Filipino boy scout
- Hilarión Daza (1840–1894), President of Bolivia
- Imelda Daza (born 1948), Colombian-Swedish politician
- Isabelle Daza (born 1988), Filipina actress and television host
- Juan Daza (died 1510), Spanish Roman Catholic prelate
- Mauricio Daza (born 1972), Chilean lawyer
- Nora Daza (1928–2013), Filipino gourmet chef
- Odúver Daza, Paralympian sprinter from Venezuela
- Óscar Daza (born 1983), Bolivian football manager
- Paul Daza (born 1961), Filipino politician
- Paula Daza (born 1960), Chilean surgeon, pediatrician and politician
- Raul Daza (1935–2026), Filipino lawyer and politician
- Víctor Hugo Daza (died 1999), student killed during the Cochabamba Water War in Bolivia
- Yonathan Daza (born 1994), Venezuelan baseball player
- Mario Gómez Daza (1907–1971), Mexican sprinter
- Nancy Romero-Daza, American anthropologist
- Plácido Vega y Daza (1830–1878), Mexican general
