= Daza =

Daza may refer to

- Toubou people in northern Africa
- Daza language
- Dazawa language also known as Daza, spoken in Nigeria
- Daza (surname)
- Daza (cicada), a genus in subfamily Cicadettinae
- Maximinus Daza, Roman emperor from 310 to 313
