= Domingo Sánchez =

Domingo Sánchez may refer to:

- Domingo Francisco Sánchez (1795-1870), Paraguayan politician and statesman who served as Vice President of Paraguay
- Domingo Sánchez (wrestler) (1899-1961), Spanish wrestler
- Domingo Sánchez (footballer) (born 1972), Argentine football manager and former footballer
