= 1996 Copa Bolivia =

Tournament details
- Country: Bolivia
- Teams: 28

Final positions
- Champions: Atlético Ciclón (1st title)
- Runners-up: ABB

Tournament statistics
- Matches played: 79
- Goals scored: 145 (1.84 per match)
- Top goal scorer: Juan Carlos (15 goals)

The 1997 is the first edition of the Copa Bolivia (formerly called the Copa Aerosur). The Copa Bolivia would start on 24 January and end on October 31 and the final will be played at Estadio Hernando Siles.

== Play-off round ==
The Play-off Round featured only LFPB and Copa Simón Bolívar teams from the First and Second tiers of the Bolivian football league system. The matches were played on 24 January 1996 and ended on 7 February. There were two replays, and four ties required a penalty shootout to settle them.

Tie no	Home team	Score	Away team	Date
1	Deportivo Aleman	2–0	Always Ready	24 January 1996
2	Oriente Petrolero	3–1	Guabirá	24 January 1996
3	Aurora	2–4	Atlético Ciclón	25 January 1996
4	Universitario (Pando)	1–1	Blooming	25 January 1996
Replay	Blooming	2–2	Universitario (Pando)	25 January 1996
Blooming won 4–2 on penalties
5	Destroyers	2–3	The Strongest	26 January 1996
6	Nacional Potosí	1–2	La Paz F.C.	26 January 1996
7	Jorge Wilstermann	1–0	Bolivar	26 January 1996
8	Unión Central	3–2	Bolivar Nimbles	26 January 1996
9	Real Santa Cruz	0–2	Deportivo Zuraca	26 January 1996
10	Unión Maestranza	2–0	Club Municipal	26 January 1996
11	Chaco Petrolero	0–2	Club Stormers San Lorenzo	27 January 1996
12	San José	2–0	ABB	7 February 1996
Replay	ABB	3–2	Club Deportivo San José	12 February 1996

== Group stages ==
=== Group A ===
Felix Capriles is the stadium to host group A and Estadio IV Centenário to Group B the draw for the teams would take place on 5 March.

Pos	Team	P	W	D	L	GF	GA	GD	Pts
1	The Strongest	5	4	1	0	14	4	+10	13
2	ABB	5	4	0	1	13	6	+7	12
3	Blooming	5	4	0	1	7	7	0	12
4	Stormers San Lorenzo	5	3	1	1	7	8	–1	10
5	Union Maestranza	5	2	0	3	2	8	–7	6
6	Deportivo Aleman	5	0	3	2	2	13	–11	3

=== Group B ===
Felix Capriles is the stadium to host group A and Estadio IV Centenário to Group B the draw for the teams would take place on 5 March.

Pos	Team	P	W	D	L	GF	GA	GD	Pts
1	Atlético Ciclón	5	5	0	0	14	4	+10	15
2	Jorge Wilstermann	5	4	0	1	10	6	+4	12
3	Oriente Petrolero	5	3	1	1	9	8	+1	10
4	Unión Central	5	3	0	2	7	13	–6	9
5	La Paz F.C.	5	2	1	2	5	10	–5	7
6	Deportivo Zuraca	5	1	0	4	4	15	–11	3

== Semi-final ==
Team 1	Agg.	Team 2	1st leg	2nd leg
Atlético Ciclón	(a) 3–3	The Strongest	2–0	1–3
Jorge Wilstermann	1–2	ABB	1–0	0–2

July 27

Atlético Ciclón	2 – 0	The Strongest
Goal

Estadio IV Centenário, Tarija
Attendance: 8,400

July 28

Jorge Wilstermann	1 – 0	ABB

, La Paz
Attendance: 24,000

August 28

ABB	2 – 0	Jorge Wilstermann

Estadio Hernando Siles, La Paz
Attendance: 16,000

August 30

The Strongest	3 – 1	Atlético Ciclón
		Goal

Estadio Hernando Siles, La Paz
Attendance: 23,000

== Final ==
Team 1	Score	Team 2
Atlético Ciclón	2–1	ABB

August 30

Atlético Ciclón	2 – 1	ABB
Juan Carlos 76' (90)		Juan Quispe 54'

Estadio Hernando Siles, La Paz
Attendance: 38,000
