= Mauricio Daza =

Chilean constituent

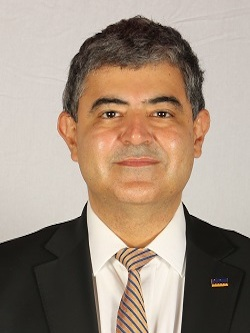

Member of the Constitutional Convention
- In office 4 July 2021 – 4 July 2022
- Constituency: 28th District

Personal details
- Born: 21 March 1972 (age 54) Santiago, Chile
- Spouse: Valentina Horvath
- Parent(s): Sergio Daza; Delia Carrasco
- Education: Universidad Central de Chile (LL.B); Diego Portales University (LL.M); Washington College of Law (Ph.D)
- Occupation: Politician
- Profession: Lawyer

Mauricio Daza Carrasco (born 21 March 1972) is a Chilean lawyer and independent politician. He served as a member of the Constitutional Convention between 2021 and 2022, representing the 28th District of the Magallanes and Chilean Antarctica Region.

He began to be known in Chile through his complaints to Soquimich and Penta, as well as by appearing on talk shows like Mentiras Verdaderas.

During the Chilean social outbreak, he was human rights lawyer.

== Professional career ==
Daza was born on 21 March 1972 in Providencia, Santiago, Chile. He is the son of Sergio Hernán Daza González and Delia Liliana Carrasco Gaspp.

He studied Law at the Central University of Chile and later completed a Master’s degree in Criminal Law and Criminal Procedure at Diego Portales University. He also holds a postgraduate degree in criminal litigation from the Washington College of Law at American University.

Professionally, Daza has worked in the private practice of law, gaining public prominence as a private prosecutor in high-profile cases related to the financing of politics, including the Penta, Corpesca, Cascadas, and SQM cases. He has also served as a legislative advisor in the Senate of Chile and participated as a panelist in various television programs.

== Political career ==
In the elections held on 15–16 May 2021, he ran as an independent candidate for the Constitutional Convention representing the 28th District of the Magallanes and Chilean Antarctica Region, as part of the Regionalismo Ciudadano Independiente pact.

He was elected with 6,188 votes, corresponding to 11.38% of the valid votes cast.
