= Richard Pellejero =

Uruguayan footballer (born 1976)

Personal information
- Full name: Richard Javier Pellejero Ferreira
- Date of birth: 30 March 1976 (age 50)
- Place of birth: Montevideo, Uruguay
- Height: 1.80 m (5 ft 11 in)
- Position: Central midfielder

Team information
- Current team: Sport Huancayo (manager)

Senior career*
Years	Team	Apps	(Gls)
1995–2000	Cerro		
2001–2002	Nacional		
2003–2006	Fenix		
2005	→ Danubio (loan)		
2006–2010	Cerro	28	(2)
2007	→ Aucas (loan)	?	(?)
2008	→ Quilmes (loan)	5	(0)
2010–2012	Universidad de Concepción	50	(2)
2012–2013	Cerro	28	(0)
2013–2015	Sud América	55	(0)
2015–2019	Cerro	113	(3)

Managerial career
- 2020–2022: Miramar Misiones
- 2022–2023: Sud América
- 2024: Uruguay Montevideo
- 2025: Sport Huancayo
- 2026–: Sport Huancayo
- * Club domestic league appearances and goals

Richard Javier Pellejero Ferreira (born 30 May 1976) is a Uruguayan football manager and former player who played as a central midfielder. He is the current manager of Peruvian club Sport Huancayo.

Pellejero had a spell in the Primera B Nacional Argentina with Quilmes during 2008.

== Playing career ==
He started his career at C.A. Cerro of Montevideo and in 2001 he was signed by powerhouse Nacional. In 2006 he returned to Cerró, staying until 2010.

On 30 April 2019, Pellejero scored a brace for Cerro in a 3–1 win over UT Cajamarca in the second leg of the 2019 Copa Sudamericana first stage, becoming, at the age of 43 years and 43 days, the oldest player to ever score in the Copa Sudamericana, breaking the previous record set by Diego Scotti in 2018, aged 41. Additionally, he also become the oldest player to ever score in an international club tournament in South America, breaking the previous record set by Zé Roberto in the 2017 Copa Libertadores, aged 42 years and 322 days.

He ended his career in 2019, with C.A. Cerro.

== Coaching career ==
After retiring at the end of 2019, Pellejero started his coaching career. On 3 August 2020, Pellejero was officially presented as Miramar Misiones' new head coach, which was his first experience outside the pitch.
