= Harry Céspedes =

Bolivian footballer (born 1998)

Harry Césepedes
Personal information
- Full name: Harry Céspedes Velasco
- Date of birth: 27 July 1998 (age 28)
- Height: 1.76 m (5 ft 9 in)
- Position: Left-back

Team information
- Current team: Guabirá

Senior career*
Years	Team	Apps	(Gls)
2018–2020	Royal Pari	39	(0)
2020–2021	Bolívar	0	(0)
2021	→ Real Tomayapo (loan)	5	(0)
2022–	Guabirá	24	(0)

International career^{‡}
2015	Bolivia U17	3	(0)
2017	Bolivia U20	2	(0)
2018–	Bolivia	1	(0)
- * Club domestic league appearances and goals as of 00:15, 11 November 2023 (UTC) ‡ National team caps and goals as of 00:15, 20 February 2023 (UTC)

Harry Céspedes Velasco (born 27 July 1998) is a Bolivian footballer who plays as a left-back for Guabirá in the Bolivian Primera División.

== Career ==
From Santa Cruz de la Sierra, Céspedes started his professional career at Real Santa Cruz in 2016. After playing for Royal Pari FC, Bolívar and Real Tomayapo he signed for Guabirá in March 2022.

== International career ==
On 16 November 2018, Céspedes made his debut for the Bolivia national football team against the U.A.E. He was called Up to the national team again in 2020.
