= David Condori =

Bolivian football manager

Personal information
- Full name: David Ascencio Condori Jiménez
- Place of birth: La Paz, Bolivia
- Position: Midfielder

Senior career*
Years	Team	Apps	(Gls)
2007	The Strongest		
2007	Mariscal Braun		
2009–2012	31 de Octubre		
2015–2016	Universitario de La Paz		

Managerial career
- 2016–2019: Bolívar (youth)
- 2019: 31 de Octubre
- 2019: Litoral de La Paz
- 2020: Chaco Petrolero
- 2021: Universitario de La Paz
- 2024: ABB
- * Club domestic league appearances and goals

David Ascencio Condori Jiménez is a Bolivian football manager and former player who played as a midfielder.

== Playing career ==
Condori was born in La Paz, and played for The Strongest, Mariscal Braun, 31 de Octubre and Universitario de La Paz.

== Managerial career ==
After retiring, Condori worked in the youth sides of Bolívar, and later was in charge of 31 de Octubre, Litoral de La Paz, Chaco Petrolero and Universitario.

In 2024, Condori was named manager of ABB. He led the club to the year's Copa Simón Bolívar title, and despite being confirmed as manager of the club for their inaugural Primera División season, he was replaced by Julio Quinteros in January.

== Honours ==
ABB

- Copa Simón Bolívar: 2024
