= Armando Ibáñez =

Bolivian footballer and manager (born 1973)

Personal information
- Full name: Armando Ibáñez Correa
- Date of birth: 4 March 1973 (age 53)
- Place of birth: Santa Cruz de la Sierra, Bolivia
- Height: 1.77 m (5 ft 10 in)
- Position: Midfielder

Team information
- Current team: Real Santa Cruz (manager)

Youth career
- 1987–1991: Real Santa Cruz

Senior career*
Years	Team	Apps	(Gls)
1991–1997	Real Santa Cruz		
1998	The Strongest	22	(3)
1999	Real Santa Cruz		
2000	Guabirá		
2001–2002	Oriente Petrolero		
2003	Independiente Petrolero		
2004	Blooming	20	(1)
2005–2006	Destroyers	39	(3)
2007	La Paz		
2008	Aurora	29	(0)
2009–2010	Destroyers		

International career
2002	Bolivia	2	(0)

Managerial career
- 2010–2013: 24 de Septiembre
- 2014–2016: Real América
- 2018–2019: Real Santa Cruz
- 2019: Mariscal Sucre
- 2020: Torre Fuerte
- 2020: Mariscal Sucre
- 2021: San Felipe
- 2021: Real Potosí
- 2022: Sur-Car
- 2023–2024: 24 de Septiembre
- 2024–: Real Santa Cruz
- * Club domestic league appearances and goals

Armando Ibáñez Correa (born 3 April 1973) is a Bolivian football manager and former player who played as a midfielder. He is the current manager of Real Santa Cruz.

== Playing career ==
=== Club ===
Born in Santa Cruz de la Sierra, Ibáñez started his career at hometown side Real Santa Cruz, joining their youth setup at the age of 14. After making his senior debut in 1991, he represented the club until 1997 before moving to The Strongest for the 1998 season.

In 1999, Ibáñez returned to Real Santa Cruz, but played for Guabirá in the 2000 campaign. In 2001 he joined Oriente Petrolero, and moved to cross-town rivals Independiente Petrolero in 2003.

Ibáñez subsequently represented Blooming, Destroyers, La Paz and Aurora before returning to Blooming in 2009. He retired with the latter in 2010, aged 37.

=== International ===
Ibáñez made his debut for the Bolivia national team on 31 January 2002, starting in a 0–6 friendly loss against Brazil. He only played in one further match for the full side, a 2–2 draw against Paraguay on 13 February of that year.

== Managerial career ==
Shortly after retiring, Ibáñez started working as a manager, being appointed in charge of 24 de Septiembre. He was subsequently in charge of Real América before returning to his first club Real Santa Cruz in 2018.

Ibáñez left Santa Cruz in June 2019, and was appointed in charge of Mariscal Sucre in September. He started the 2020 campaign at the helm of Torre Fuerte, before returning to Mariscal Sucre in October.

On 14 May 2021, after a period in charge of San Felipe, Ibáñez replaced Carlos Fonseca as manager of Real Potosí.
