= Jorge Araúz =

Bolivian footballer (born 1995)

Personal information
- Full name: Jorge Araúz Saucedo
- Date of birth: March 14, 1995 (age 31)
- Place of birth: Santa Cruz de la Sierra
- Height: 1.85 m (6 ft 1 in)
- Position: Goalkeeper

Team information
- Current team: Oriente Petrolero
- Number: 1

Senior career*
Years	Team	Apps	(Gls)
2013-2017	Club Blooming	28	(0)
2018	→ Royal Pari F.C. (loan)	33	(0)
2019-2024	Royal Pari F.C.	131	(0)
2024	GV San José	5	(0)
2025-	Oriente Petrolero	18	(0)

International career^{‡}
2019	Bolivia	1	(0)
- * Club domestic league appearances and goals as of 12:15, 30 December 2024 (UTC) ‡ National team caps and goals as of 12:58, 30 January 2023 (UTC)

Jorge ‘Manota’ Araúz Saucedo (born 15 November 1995) is a Bolivian footballer who plays as a goalkeeper for Bolivian Primera División side Oriente Petrolero

== Career ==
Araúz joined Royal Pari F.C. in December 2018 from Club Blooming for a fee of $120,000. Royal Pari had just been promoted to the Bolivian top division and were looking to reinforce their squad and initially signed him on loan for a season before making the deal permanent.

Such was his form at his new club he was awarded the “Winged Victory” award by Santa Cruz journalists for the most outstanding sportsman. He had helped his newly promoted team excel in the Bolivian Primera Division and qualify for the Copa Sudamericana as they finished the Clausara season in third place level on points with The Strongest in second.

== International career ==
Araúz made his debut for the Bolivia national football team away at Venezuela on 10 October 2019 in Caracas.
