= Mentiras Verdaderas =

Mentiras Verdaderas is a Chilean talk show which has gained relevance for its political interviews.

From 2015 to 2018, its animator was Ignacio Franzani. Similarly, in 2016, the program had a space dedicated to history called Cultura Verdadera, in which there were historians like Gabriel Salazar, Igor Goicovic, Sergio Grez, Leonardo León or Esteban Valenzuela Van Treek. On the other hand, another regular participant of the program was María Luisa Cordero, a current member of the Chamber of Deputies of Chile.
