= Vladimir Castellón =

Bolivian footballer (born 1989)

Personal information
- Full name: Vladimir Castellón Colque
- Date of birth: August 12, 1989 (age 37)
- Place of birth: Cochabamba, Bolivia
- Height: 1.75 m (5 ft 9 in)
- Position: Forward

Team information
- Current team: Real Tomayapo
- Number: 31

Youth career
- 2005–2006: Aurora

Senior career*
Years	Team	Apps	(Gls)
2006–2014	Aurora	138	(46)
2014–2015	Blooming	11	(1)
2015–2016	Guabirá	12	(5)
2016–2017	Real Potosí	57	(14)
2018	Xelajú	20	(4)
2018	Aurora	21	(6)
2019	Nacional Potosí	25	(12)
2019–2020	Bolívar	33	(13)
2021	Palmaflor	26	(5)
2022	Universitario de Sucre	12	(2)
2022–2023	Wilstermann	46	(10)
2024–	Real Tomayapo	7	(0)

International career
2009	Bolivia U-20	2	(0)
2014–2019	Bolivia	5	(0)
- * Club domestic league appearances and goals as of 17:03, 30 November 2019 (UTC)

Vladimir Castellón Colque (born 12 August 1989) is a Bolivian professional footballer who plays as a striker for Real Tomayapo.

Castellón was singled out as a star in 2008 when he helped Aurora win their first ever title in the club's history by scoring 12 times in the championship. He is a physical striker despite his nonthreatening appearance.

== International career ==
Castellón was part of the Bolivia U-20 squad that participated in the 2009 South American U-20 Championship playing in two games. On October 14, 2014, he made his debut with the senior national team under interim manager Mauricio Soria in an international friendly against Chile with a 2–2 draw played in Coquimbo.

== Honours ==
=== Club ===
- Aurora
  - Liga de Fútbol Profesional Boliviano: 2008 (C)
