= Horacio Pacheco =

Bolivian football manager

Personal information
- Date of birth: 5 May 1983 (age 43)
- Place of birth: Tarija, Bolivia

Team information
- Current team: Bolivia U15 (manager)

Managerial career
- Years: Team
- 2014–2016: Universitario Tarija
- 2016–2017: Ciclón
- 2018: Avilés Industrial
- 2019–2021: Real Tomayapo
- 2023: Ciclón
- 2024–: Bolivia (assistant)
- 2024–: Bolivia U15

Horacio Pacheco (born 5 May 1983) is a Bolivian football manager, currently in charge of the Bolivia national under-15 team.

== Career ==
Pacheco was born in Tarija. After beginning his career as a fitness coach, he began his managerial career in 2014, with Universitario de Tarija. He took the club to the semifinals of the Copa Simón Bolívar in the 2015–16 campaign, and was subsequently appointed in charge of Ciclón in July 2016.

Pacheco resigned from Ciclón on 24 February 2017, and took over Avilés Industrial for the 2018 campaign. With the latter club he reached the finals of the Simón Bolívar, but lost it to Always Ready, and subsequently missed out promotion after losing the play-offs to Destroyers.

In February 2019, Pacheco was named in charge of Real Tomayapo, and won the second division with the club in 2020. On 6 January 2021, he renewed his contract for a further year for the club's debut in the Primera División.

Pacheco resigned from Tomayapo on 8 August 2021, and was named coach of the Asociación Tarijeña de Fútbol in March 2022. He was appointed manager of Ciclón on 12 February 2023, but resigned fourteen days later after having discrepancies with the club's board.

== Honours ==
Real Tomayapo

- Copa Simón Bolívar: 2020
