= Guimer Justiniano =

Bolivian footballer (born 1989)

Personal information
- Full name: Guimer Justiniano Osorio
- Date of birth: June 29, 1989 (age 37)
- Place of birth: Santa Cruz de la Sierra
- Position: Central defender

Team information
- Current team: Aurora
- Number: 35

Senior career*
Years	Team	Apps	(Gls)
2013-2017	Club Deportivo Guabirá	31	(1)
2018-2023	Royal Pari F.C.	119	(5)
2023–2025	Club Blooming	7	(0)
2025–	Aurora	7	(0)

International career^{‡}
2019–	Bolivia	3	(0)
- * Club domestic league appearances and goals as of 31 December 2025 ‡ National team caps and goals as of 12:58, 13 September 2022 (UTC)

Guimer Justiniano Osorio (born 29 June 1989) is a Bolivian footballer who plays in central defence for Bolivian Primera División for Aurora.

== Club career ==
Having initially played as a left-back he began to transition to centre-back in 2018 due to his aerial ability. He wore the captains armband for Royal Pari for the first time in October 2020 as the club started playing again after the enforced break from playing for the COVID-19 pandemic.

In January 2023, he signed for Club Blooming.

== International career ==
He made his full debut for Bolivia on the 10 October 2019, against Venezuela. Further international call-ups to Bolivian squad came in 2020.

== Honours ==
Guabirá

- Copa Simón Bolívar: 2012–13, 2015–16

Royal Pari

- Copa Simón Bolívar: 2017
