= Bryan Oña =

Ecuadorian footballer (born 1993)

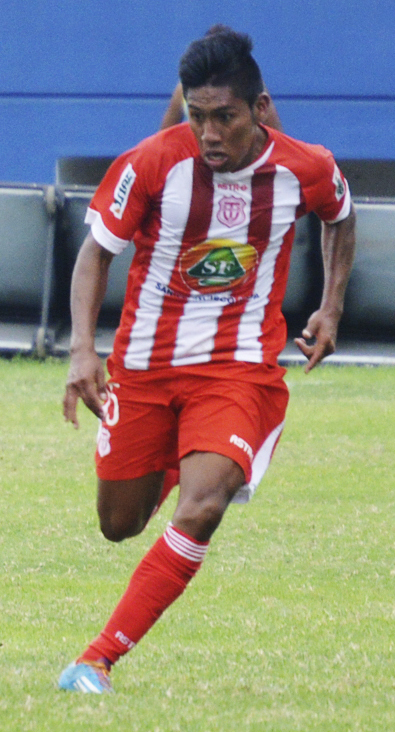
- Oña playing for Universitario in 2014

Personal information
- Full name: Bryan Gabriel Oña Simbaña
- Date of birth: 12 December 1993 (age 32)
- Place of birth: Sangolquí, Ecuador
- Height: 1.77 m (5 ft 10 in)
- Position: Winger

Team information
- Current team: El Nacional

Youth career
- –2012: El Nacional

Senior career*
Years	Team	Apps	(Gls)
2012–2014	El Nacional	20	(2)
2014–2015	Universitario	38	(4)
2015–2017	Cuenca	70	(8)
2017–2018	Delfín	60	(3)
2019–2020	Universidad Católica	7	(0)
2021	9 de Octubre	1	(0)
2022	Olmedo	20	(0)
2023–	El Nacional	0	(0)
- * Club domestic league appearances and goals as of 20:55, 20 February 2021 (UTC)

Bryan Gabriel Oña Simbaña (born December 12, 1993) is an Ecuadorian footballer who plays for El Nacional.

== Playing career ==
Having started his career at El Nacional, Oña spent a year at Técnico Universitario, where he scored 5 goals in all competitions, before moving on to Cuenca. He signed a new, four-year contract with Cuenca in May 2016. However, on 6 March 2017, Oña joined Ecuadorian Serie A side Delfín.

Simbaña joined Universidad Católica for the 2019 season.
