= Pablo Godoy =

Paraguayan football manager (born 1984)

Personal information
- Full name: Pablo Andrés Godoy Cartes
- Date of birth: 30 April 1984 (age 42)
- Place of birth: Asunción, Paraguay
- Height: 1.75 m (5 ft 9 in)
- Position: Midfielder

Team information
- Current team: Always Ready (manager)

Senior career*
Years	Team	Apps	(Gls)
- Real Potosí
- Universitario de Sucre
2013–2015	ABB		

Managerial career
- 2015–2016: Always Ready (youth)
- 2016: Always Ready
- 2017–2021: Always Ready (youth)
- 2017: Always Ready (interim)
- 2019: Always Ready (interim)
- 2021: Always Ready
- 2022: Always Ready (reserves)
- 2022: Universitario de Vinto
- 2023: Always Ready
- 2023: Ciclón
- 2023–2024: Universitario de Vinto
- 2025: ABB
- 2025: Nacional Potosí
- 2025: ABB
- 2026–: Always Ready
- * Club domestic league appearances and goals

Pablo Andrés Godoy Cartes (born 30 April 1984) is a Paraguayan football manager and former player who played as a midfielder. He is the current manager of Bolivian club Always Ready.

== Career ==
Godoy joined Bolivian side Always Ready in 2015, initially as manager of the youth and reserve sides. In September 2019, he was an interim manager of the first team after the departure of Julio César Baldivieso, but his reign only lasted one day as the club hired Sebastián Núñez. He was also an interim manager of the main squad previously on two occasions, both in the Copa Simón Bolívar.

In December 2019, after Núñez left and the club hired Eduardo Villegas for the 2020 season, Godoy was an interim manager for the last two matches of the campaign. He subsequently returned to his previous role, but was named permanent first team manager on 29 July 2021, in the place of sacked Omar Asad.

Demoted to the reserve squad of Always Ready on 29 January 2022, Godoy was appointed in charge of fellow top tier side Universitario de Vinto on 15 August. On 27 December, he resigned from the latter club just weeks after agreeing to a new deal, and returned to Always Ready the following day.

On 6 March 2023, after the club's elimination in the 2023 Copa Libertadores, Godoy was sacked, and returned to U de Vinto on 14 July. He left the latter in the end of the 2024 season, after his contract was not renewed, and took over newcomers ABB on 14 February 2025.

Godoy resigned from ABB on 17 July 2025, and took over Nacional Potosí eight days later. On 9 September, he was sacked from the latter, and returned to ABB on 6 October.

Originally saving the club from relegation, ABB was scheduled to play the promotion/relegation play-offs after Aurora's deduction was upheld, and Godoy resigned from the club on 20 December 2025, one day before the first match of the play-offs. He returned to Always Ready the following 24 August, with the club as league leaders.
