= Carlos Fonseca (football manager) =

Spanish football manager

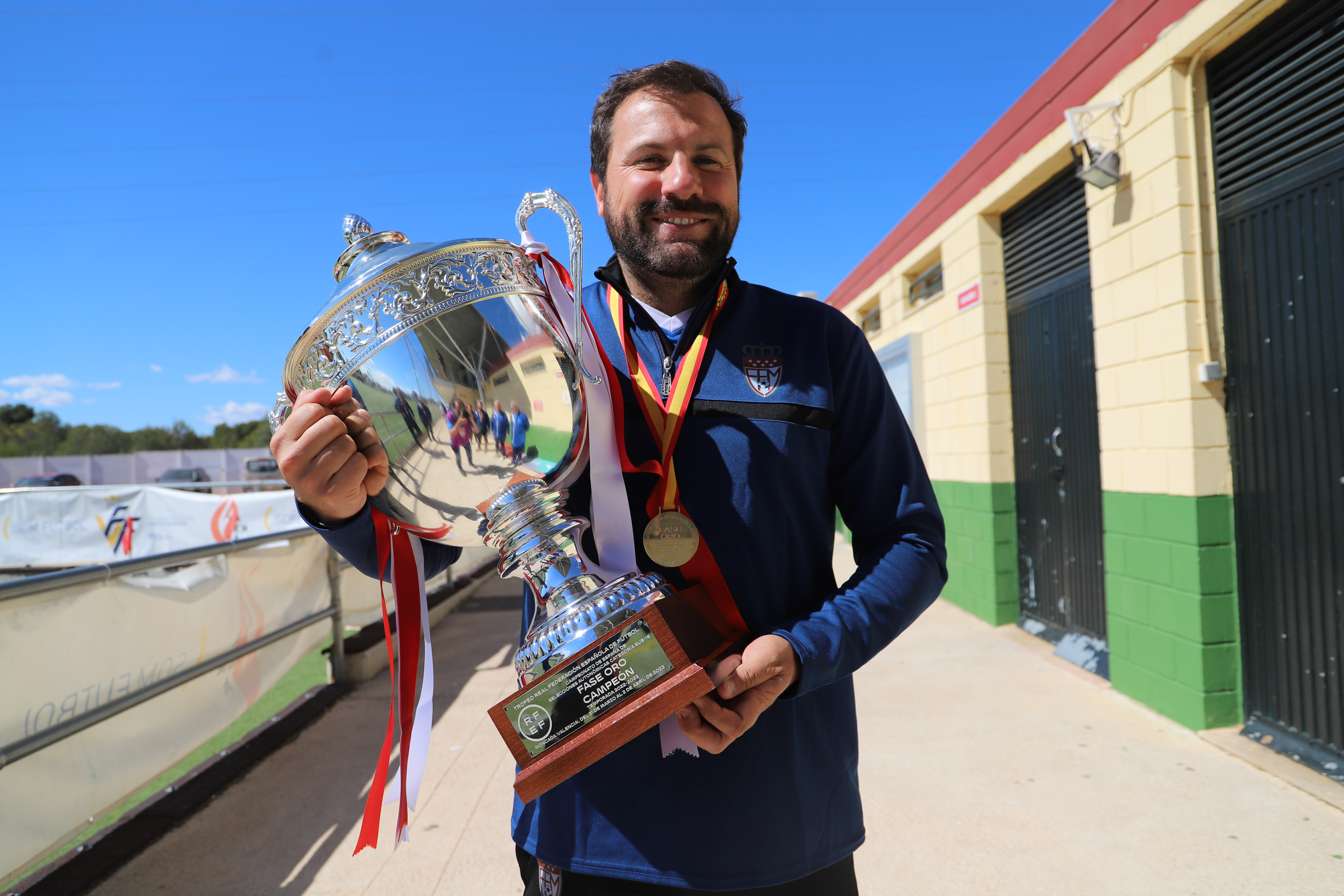
- Fonseca in 2023

Personal information
- Full name: Carlos Agustín Fonseca Teijeiro
- Date of birth: 8 March 1981 (age 45)
- Place of birth: Madrid, Spain

Team information
- Current team: East Bengal(assistant)

Managerial career
- Years: Team
- 2012–2016: La Granja (youth)
- 2016–2019: Getafe (youth)
- 2019–2020: La Granja
- 2020–2021: Al-Tai
- 2021–2022: Real Potosí
- 2022–2023: Vaca Díez
- 2023–2024: Riga FC
- 2024–2026: Inter Kashi (assistant)
- 2026–: East Bengal(assistant)

Carlos Agustín Fonseca Teijeiro (born 8 March 1981) is a Spanish football manager, currently working as an assistant coach for the Indian Super League club East Bengal.

== Career ==
Fonseca was born in Madrid, and started his career with EF Arganda's Cadete squad in 2012. Ahead of the 2014–15 season, he was appointed manager of the Juvenil squad, and managed the side for two years before joining Getafe CF.

On 26 June 2019, Fonseca was presented as manager of Tercera División side CD La Granja. On 27 October, after only winning six out of 36 possible points and a 0–6 loss to Zamora CF, he was sacked.

In August 2020, Fonseca moved abroad and joined Al-Tai in Saudi Arabia, being in charge of the under-23 side. On 9 February 2021, he replaced compatriot Alex Pallarés at the helm of Bolivian side Real Potosí.

Fonseca was sacked by Potosí on 13 May 2021, with his club in the penultimate position. On 30 November 2022, he was presented by the Royal Madrid Football Federation as their new head coach of the under-16 category, and won a national tournament with the federation the following April, beating the Catalan Football Federation in the final.

On 6 May 2023, Fonseca returned to Bolivia and replaced compatriot José Aurelio Gay at the helm of Vaca Díez. On 21 July, he was sacked.

On 9 January 2024, Fonseca moved abroad and was named manager of the U19 team of Riga FC in Latvia. He was appointed as the assistant manager of Inter Kashi in India and also headed their team in 2025 Super Cup.

== Personal life ==
In 2018, Fonseca published a book called ¿Hablamos de fútbol? (Do we talk about football? in English).

He has a website of his own (https://carlosfonseca.es/)
