= Imelda Daza =

Colombian-Swedish economist, teacher, and politician

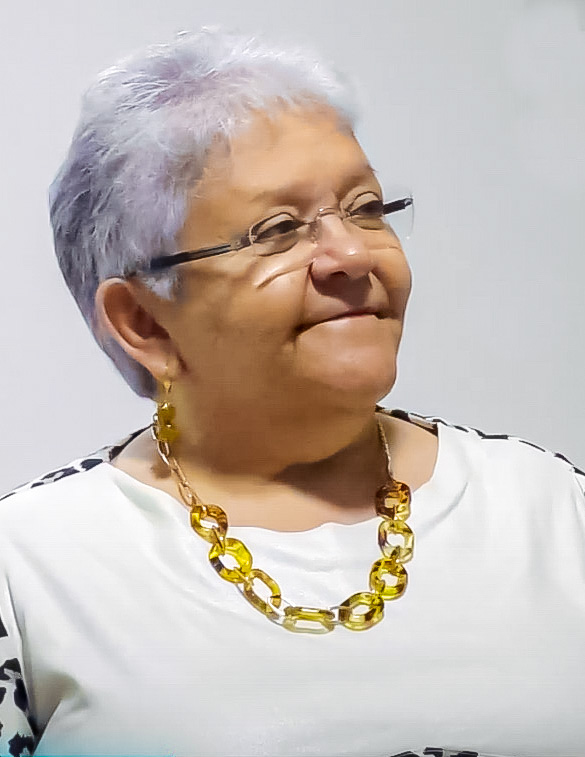
- Daza in 2022

Member of the Senate of Colombia
- Incumbent
- Assumed office 20 July 2022

Personal details
- Born: Imelda Daza Cotes; 17 March 1948 (age 78) Valledupar, Colombia
- Party: Patriotic Union (Colombia; 1985–2016); Commons (Colombia; 2017–present); Social Democratic (Sweden; 2002–2014); Left Party (Sweden; 2014–2015)
- Children: 3
- Education: National University of Colombia
- Occupation: Economist, teacher, politician

Imelda Daza Cotes (born 17 March 1948) is a Colombian-Swedish economist, teacher, and politician.

She has participated in left-wing political movements in both Colombia and Sweden. In 1986, she was elected councilor for the Patriotic Union (UP), but had to go into exile due to death threats. She returned to Colombia in June 2015 to present herself as a candidate for the governorship of Cesar Department. In October 2016, she was appointed as a spokesperson in the Chamber of Representatives on behalf of Voices of Peace and Reconciliation, which accompanied the implementation of the peace agreement. The online newspaper La Silla Vacía included her in its list of 50 key figures for the success of the post-conflict period.

On 1 November 2017, she was chosen to be Rodrigo Londoño's vice-presidential running mate, representing Commons, the political successor of the Revolutionary Armed Forces of Colombia (FARC).

She was elected to the Colombian Senate for Commons in the 2022 parliamentary election.

== Early life and entry into politics ==
Imelda Daza Cotes was born in Valledupar, Cesar Department on 17 March 1948. She earned a degree in economics from the National University of Colombia. Together with other professors and students, she promoted the creation of the Popular University of Cesar in 1973. Motivated by the speeches of Luis Carlos Galán, she became the first woman president of the Valledupar city council in 1983, commissioned by liberals and conservatives. Along with a group which included Ricardo Palmera Pineda, she formed a popular civic movement called Common Cause, which would later join the UP. On 25 May 1986, as a member of the UP, she was elected councilor of Valledupar, along with six councilors in other municipalities.

All of these other councilors plus a congressional deputy were killed during an extermination effort against the party. In July 1987, days after the assassination of her political partner José F. Ramírez, a wreath was placed in Daza's front yard, with an invitation to her own funeral. She was thus forced to leave Valledupar on 20 July 1987 for Bogotá, where she believed she could keep a low profile and lead a normal life.

Again pressured, she had to leave Colombia in 1988 for Lima, Peru, but was unable to stay there. She then went with her family to Sweden, a country that granted them political asylum.

== Exile in Sweden ==
Imelda Daza lived in Jönköping from September 1989 to June 2015, where she worked as a school and university teacher. She also became involved in politics, serving as a councilor for the Swedish Social Democratic Party from 2002 to 2014. In the latter year she was elected councilor for the Left Party in Aneby. She was also a three-time candidate for Parliament.

In 1996, she tried to return to Colombia, but due to the state of the armed conflict in the country, and the many acquaintances who had been killed in Valledupar, she returned to Sweden.

== Return to Colombia ==
Invited by her friends, Daza returned to Valledupar on 25 June 2015 to present herself as a candidate for the governorship of Cesar, endorsed by the UP, and with the support of the Green Alliance, Alternative Democratic Pole, MAIS, Progressive Movement, and other sectors. Her proposals included an expansion of the department's hospital network, as well as a greater allocation for education, economic and equitable management, and women's, gender, and sexual diversity budgets.

After four months of campaigning, she finished third in the elections of 25 October 2015, behind Franco Ovalle (54.45%) and Arturo Calderón (40.61%). She received 8,300 votes, which represented 1.89% of the total. Despite the result, she stated that the vote was historic due to the fact that, in a region with a strong predominance of right-wing paramilitarism, for the first time in a long time, a leftist force was electorally present.

As a UP activist, she toured the country with Pedagogy for Peace, and later promoted the "Yes" option for the peace agreement referendum.

== Member of Voices of Peace and Reconciliation ==
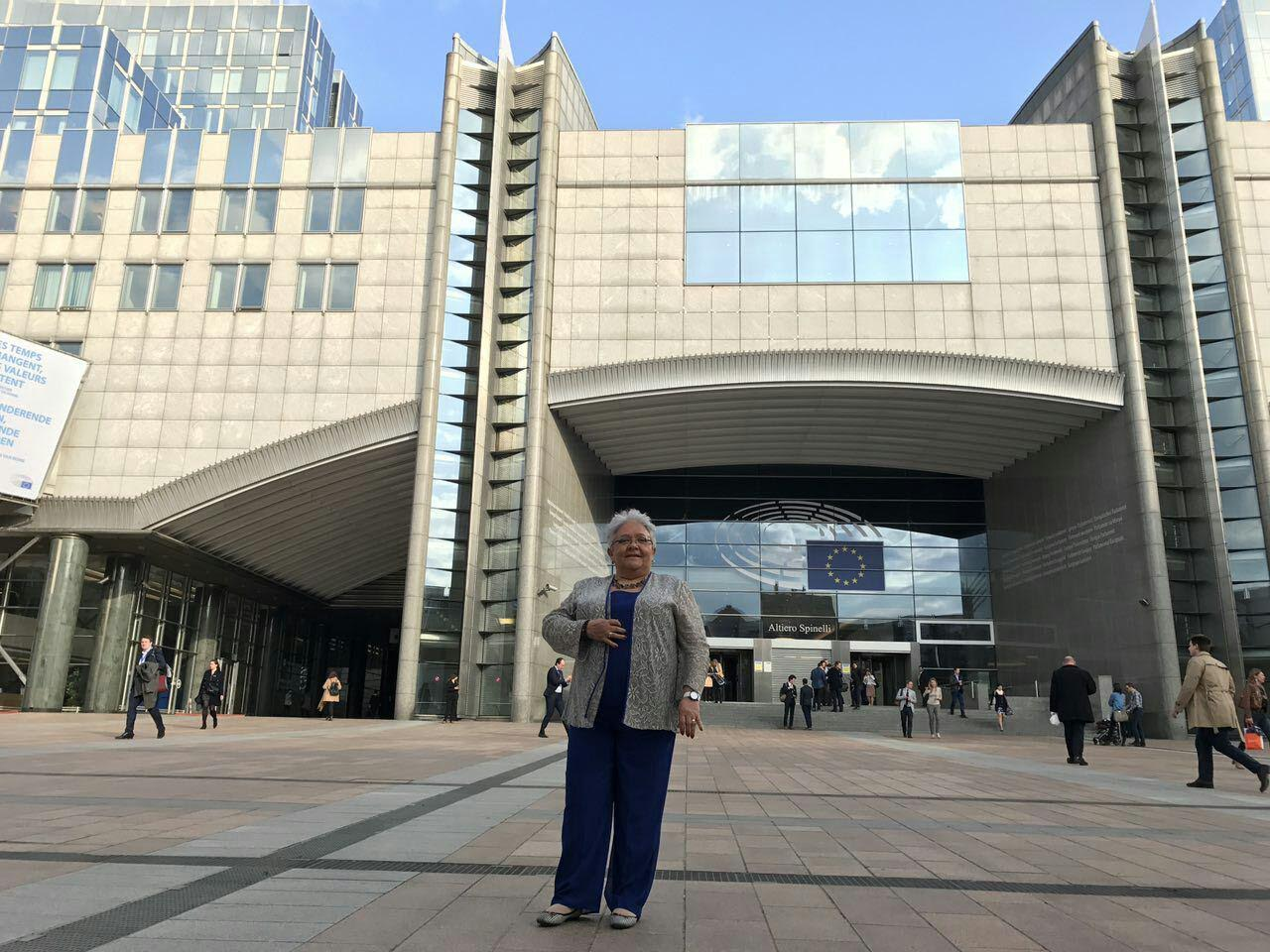
Daza at the doors of European Parliament in Brussels

On 24 November 2016, the FARC commander-in-chief, Rodrigo Londoño Echeverri, signed the Final Peace Agreement with President Juan Manuel Santos. Point three of the agreement, pertaining to "Guarantees for the new political party or movement", set conditions for the creation of the group Voices of Peace and Reconciliation (Spanish: Voces de Paz y Reconciliación), which would have a seat in Congress to accompany the implementation of the agreement.

Along with Francisco Toloza and Jairo Rivera, Imelda Daza was elected as the organization's representative in the Chamber of Representatives, with a voice but no vote, on 19 December 2016.

== Vice-presidential candidate and senator ==
On 1 November 2017, Daza was chosen to be Rodrigo Londoño's vice-presidential running mate, representing the FARC. He resigned as a candidate due to health problems in March 2018, and the group did not name a replacement.

She was elected to the Colombian Senate for the Commons party in the 2022 parliamentary election.

== Personal life ==
As of 2017, she has been married for 45 years, with three children who live in Sweden.
