= Sebastián Núñez =

Chilean football manager

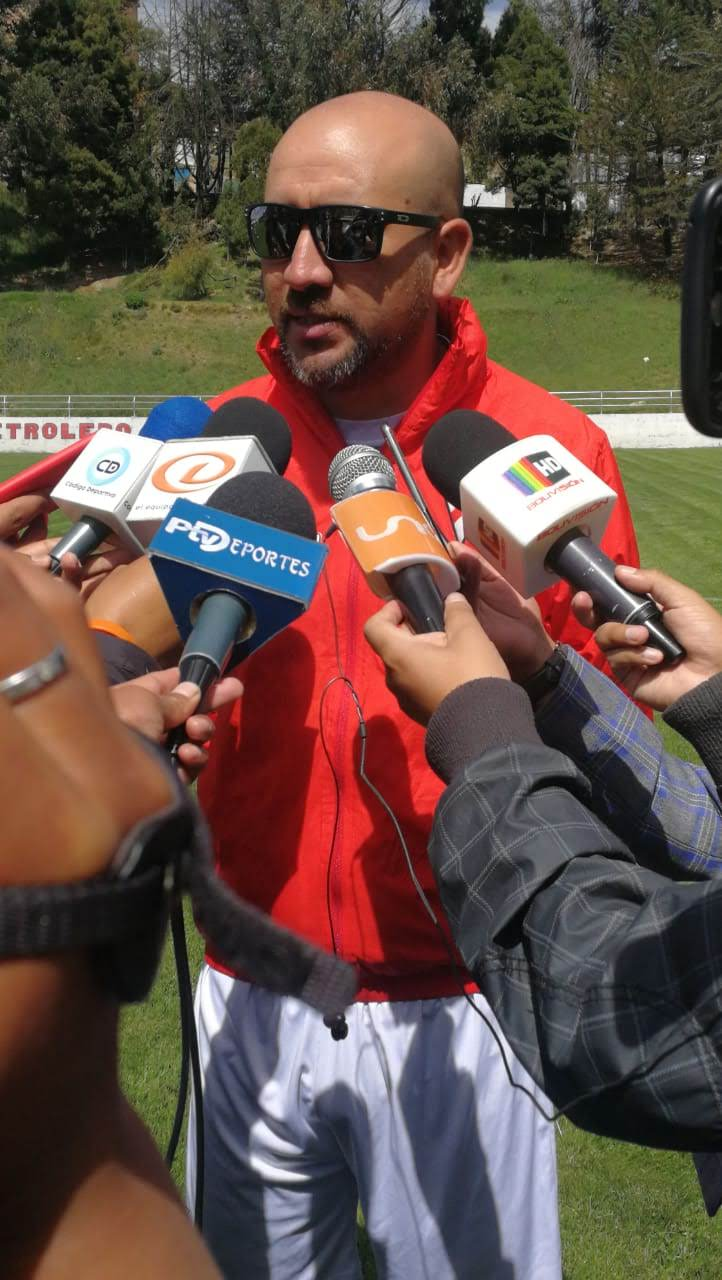
- Núñez as manager of Always Ready in 2019

Personal information
- Full name: Sebastián Emilio Núñez Rojas
- Date of birth: 13 March 1982 (age 44)
- Place of birth: Concón, Chile
- Height: 1.80 m (5 ft 11 in)

Managerial career
- Years: Team
- 2008–2013: Santiago Wanderers (youth)
- 2014: Huehueteco (assistant)
- 2015: Deportivo Xinabajul (assistant)
- 2016: Santiago Wanderers (youth)
- 2018: Deportivo FATIC
- 2018: Sport Boys Warnes (assistant)
- 2019: Bolívar (assistant)
- 2019: Always Ready
- 2020–2021: Nacional Potosí
- 2021: Always Ready
- 2021: Real Potosí
- 2022: Cortuluá (assistant)
- 2022: Universitario de Sucre
- 2023–2024: San Antonio Unido
- 2025: Concón National
- 2026: ABB

Sebastián Emilio Núñez Rojas (born 13 March 1982) is a Chilean football manager.

== Career ==
Abroad, Núñez has worked in Guatemala, Bolivia and Colombia.

In 2023, he signed with San Antonio Unido in the Segunda División Profesional de Chile. In March 2024, he was released and replaced by Fabián Marzuca.

In January 2026, Núñez returned to Bolivia and assumed as head coach of ABB.
