= Sergio Migliaccio =

Uruguayan footballer and manager (born 1974)

Personal information
- Full name: Sergio Javier Migliaccio Magliano
- Date of birth: 3 June 1974 (age 52)
- Place of birth: Montevideo, Uruguay
- Height: 1.84 m (6 ft 0 in)
- Position: Goalkeeper

Senior career*
Years	Team	Apps	(Gls)
1994–1995	Central Español	0	(0)
1996	Guardia Republicana	0	(0)
1997–1998	Central Español	0	(0)
1999–2000	Provincial Osorno	63	(1)
2001	River Plate Montevideo	17	(0)
2001	Deportivo Maldonado	14	(0)
2002	Rocha	0	(0)
2002	Montevideo Wanderers	0	(0)
2003	Miramar Misiones		
2004	Cobresal	33	(0)
2005–2006	Boyacá Chicó	47	(0)
2006–2007	Miramar Misiones		
2007–2008	Sud América	16	(1)
2008–2011	Liverpool Montevideo	4	(0)
2011–2012	Rentistas	2	(0)
2012–2013	Cerrito	13	(1)

Managerial career
- 2021: Jorge Wilstermann (interim)
- 2021: Jorge Wilstermann
- 2022: Jorge Wilstermann (interim)
- 2022: Jorge Wilstermann (interim)
- 2024: Boyacá Chicó
- * Club domestic league appearances and goals

Sergio Javier Migliaccio Magliano (born 3 June 1974) is a Uruguayan football manager and former player who played as a goalkeeper. He last managed Colombian club Boyacá Chicó.
