= Iván Brun =

Argentine footballer (born 1984)

Iván Alejandro Brun (born 19 January 1984) is an Argentine professional footballer who plays as a goalkeeper for Independiente Petrolero.

== Early life ==
A native of Lobos, as a youth player Brun joined the youth academy Huracán de Parque Patricios.

== Career ==
Ivan Brun is started his career in 2004 with Deportivo Español, before plying for Deportivo Madryn, Coreano de Lobos, Cruz del Sur de Bariloche, Boca de Río Gallegos, Tristán Suárez, and Sportivo Desamparados de San Juan, all in Argentina, before signing for Bolivian side Petrolero, where he was regarded as an idol. He conceded thirty-three goals and scored one goal during his first twelve games for the club. After that, he signed for Universitario de Sucre. However, he suffered unpaid payments while playing for the club.

Before the 2019 season, Brun signed for Ecuadorean side Olmedo, where he suffered a cranial contusion after colliding with a teammate during a league game. He also suffered unpaid payments while playing for the club due to their financial problems. Despite this, he was regarded as one of the standout players in the Ecuadorian top flight during the 2019 season. Before the 2020 season, he signed for Mushuc Runa. In 2021, he returned to Universitario de Sucre in Bolivia.

Before the 2023 season, he signed for Independiente Petrolero after being the "undisputed starter" for Universitario de Sucre during the 2022 season, playing thirty-nine of the forty-two games that season including the promotion-relegation games against Libertad Gran Mamoré.

== Style of play ==
Brun is known as a goalkeeper who is a free-kick specialist. He has scored nine free-kicks during his career to date. He has been compared to Paraguayan goalkeeper free kick-specialist José Luis Chilavert. is also known for his reflexes and ability to handle dead ball situations.
