= Igor Goicovic =

Chilean historian

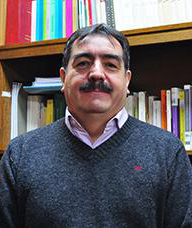

Personal details
- Born: 5 November 1960 (age 65) Illapel, Chile
- Party: Revolutionary Left Movement (MIR)
- Education: Pontifical Catholic University of Valparaíso (BA); University of Santiago de Chile (MA); University of Murcia (PhD)
- Occupation: Researcher; Social worker
- Profession: Historian

Igor Alexis Goicovic Donoso (born 5 November 1960) is a Chilean historian and scholar dedicated to the social history, field which he has territorially deploy in Viña del Mar.

He has taught lessons at the University of Chile or the University of Playa Ancha.

== Biography ==
Goicovic was born in the town of Illapel at the Coquimbo Region. Then he completed his High School at the C-17 Lyceum of Los Vilos, near to La Serena. In 1980, he joined the History Institute of the Pontifical Catholic University of Valparaíso where he graduated in 1989 as Professor of History and Geography.

While studying, he was a tough activist against Augusto Pinochet's dictatorship. First, as a member of the Socialist Party Youth (JS) and then in the ranks of the Revolutionary Left Movement (MIR), Marxist-leninist organisation.

As a consequence of his role of activist, Goicovic was arrested on two occasions: first, in 1982, when he was accused of violating Decree Law No. 77, which outlawed leftist political organizations, so he was jailed for three months in the La Serena Public Jail; the second time, in 1984, he was accused of violating the Law on Arms and Explosives Control of October 21, 1972, being this time jailed for two years in the Valparaíso Public Prison.

When the dictatorship had ended, in 1990, he joined the Vina del Mar Municipal Corporation for Social Development as teacher of History and Geography. There, he worked until 2002 as classroom teacher at the Los Castaños Adult Education Center (the current «Los Castaños Education, Training and Improvement Center»).
