= Nancy Romero-Daza =

Nancy Romero-Daza is a medical anthropologist with an appointment as associate professor at the University of South Florida. From 1994 to 1998, she worked for the Hispanic Health Council in Hartford, Connecticut in several capacities, including senior research scientist. She works in medical anthropology, including HIV/AIDS, women's health, health problems in the inner city, infant mortality, drug abuse, syndemics, and commercial sex. Romero-Daza's geographical areas of interest include Costa Rica, Southern Africa, and the United States.

== Publications ==
Romero-Daza's research addresses areas of anthropology including HIV/AIDS in developing countries, HIV/AIDS among minority populations, traditional healing practices, maternal and child health, reproductive health, health care decision making, cultural competency in service provision, political economy of health, HIV risk among sex workers and injection drug users, and medical pluralism. Her publications include:

- Romero-Daza, N., Baldwin, J., Lescano, C., Williamson, H.J., Tilley, D.L., I. Chan, M. Tewell, Palacios, W.R. Syndemic Theory as a Model for Training and Mentorship to Address HIV/AIDS Among Latinos in the U.S. Annals of Anthropological Practice 35(1)
- Romero-Daza, N., Ruth, A.; Denis-Luque, M; Luque, J. (2009) Caring for Haitian Orphans with AIDS, an Alternative Model of Care for HIV Positive Children. Journal of Healthcare for the Poor and Underserved. (20)4 (supplement): 36-40
- Romero-Daza, N., Freidus, A. (2008) Female Tourists, Casual Sex, and HIV/AIDS in Costa Rica. Qualitative Sociology (31)2: 169-187
- Romero-Daza, N (2005) Design of HIV awareness materials in rural Costa Rica: A community participatory approach. AIDS and Anthropology Bulletin (17)2: 23-25.
- Romero-Daza, N., Weeks, M., Singer, M. (2005) Conceptualizing the impact of indirect violence on HIV risk among women involved in street level prostitution. Aggression and Violent Behavior, 10(2): 153-170.
- Romero-Daza, N., Himmelgreen, D. (2004) The Sotho: Health and Illness: Encyclopedia of Medical Anthropology: Health and Illness in the World Cultures, Kluwer Academic Publishers, New York: Vol 2: 957-964
- Romero-Daza, N., Weeks, M., Singer, M. (2003) “Nobody gives a damn if I live or die”. Experiences of violence among drug-using sex workers in Hartford, CT. Medical Anthropology 22(3): 233-259.
