= Omar Siles =

Bolivian footballer (born 1992)

Pedro Siles
Personal information
- Full name: Omar Pedro Siles Canda
- Date of birth: 15 November 1992 (age 33)
- Place of birth: Santa Cruz de la Sierra, Bolivia
- Height: 1.84 m (6 ft 0 in)
- Position: Midfielder

Team information
- Current team: Real Tomayapo
- Number: 27

Youth career
- Academía Tahuichi
- 2006–2011: Universidad

Senior career*
Years	Team	Apps	(Gls)
2011–2013	Universidad		
2013–2017	Guabirá	27	(0)
2018–2022	Royal Pari	162	(14)
2023–2024	Blooming	58	(1)
2025-	Real Tomayapo	10	(0)
- * Club domestic league appearances and goals as of 17:19, 11 July 2025 (UTC)

Omar Pedro Siles Canda (born 15 November 1992) is a Bolivian footballer who plays as a midfielder for C.D. Real Tomayapo in the Bolivian first division.

== Club career ==
Born in Santa Cruz de la Sierra, Siles started it out at Academía Tahuichi before joining Universidad at the age of 14. In July 2013, he joined Guabirá.

On 31 July 2017, Siles was presented at Royal Pari FC and helped the club in their promotion to the Bolivian Primera División. During the 2018 season, he was an ever-present figure as his side finished in an impressive fifth position, qualifying to the 2019 Copa Sudamericana.
