= Clube Atlético Paulistinha =

Brazilian football club

Paulistinha
- Full name: Clube Atlético Paulistinha
- Nickname(s): Paulistinha de São Carlos
- Founded: August 3, 1958
- Dissolved: April 26, 2023; 22 months ago
- Ground: Luís Augusto de Oliveira; São Carlos, São Paulo State, Brazil
- Capacity: 10,000
- Chairman: Vilmar Rodrigues
- Manager: Gilmar Aparecido Rodrigues
Home colours	Away colours	Third colours

Clube Atlético Paulistinha, usually called CAP, or Paulistinha, as they are usually called, was a Brazilian football team from São Carlos in São Paulo state, founded on 3 August 1958.

They played in red, black and white shirts, white shorts and red socks.

== History ==
The club was founded on August 3, 1958, by club company. Inactive from professional football since 2013, the club's assets were liquidated by the Brazilian court on 26 April 2023.

== Stadium ==
CA Paulistinha played their matches at Luisão Stadium, inaugurated on 3 November 1968, with a maximum capacity of 10,000 people.

== Trivia ==
- The club's mascot was a Scrooge McDuck.
