= Óscar Daza =

Bolivian football manager

Personal information
- Full name: Óscar Bernardo Daza Flores
- Date of birth: 24 April 1983 (age 43)
- Place of birth: Oruro, Bolivia

Managerial career
- Years: Team
- 2017: Club América (youth)
- 2017–2018: Potros UAEM (assistant)
- 2018–2021: Bolívar (youth)
- 2021: San José

Óscar Bernardo Daza Flores (born 24 August 1983) is a Bolivian football manager.

== Career ==
Born in Oruro, Daza acquired his coaching licenses in Mexico, and worked in the youth categories of several clubs in the country, including Club América. He was also an assistant manager at Potros UAEM.

In 2018, Daza returned to his home country after being named manager of Bolívar's youth setup. On 26 August 2021, he was appointed in charge of San José, but only lasted one match before being sacked on 14 September.
