= Domingo Sánchez (footballer) =

Argentine footballer and manager

Personal information
- Full name: Domingo Alberto Sánchez
- Date of birth: 5 November 1972 (age 53)
- Place of birth: Argentina

Youth career
- 1986–1988: Defensa y Justicia

Senior career*
Years	Team	Apps	(Gls)
1989–1992	Defensa y Justicia		
1992	Orcobol		
1993–1995	Guabirá		
1996	Independiente Petrolero		
1996	Universitario de Beni		
1997–2000	Atlético Pompeya		

Managerial career
- 2002: Universitario de Beni
- 2003: Primero de Mayo
- 2003: Deportivo Mamoré
- 2004: Primero de Mayo
- 2005–2007: Universitario de Beni
- 2007: Destroyers
- 2008: Primero de Mayo
- 2009: Real Mamoré (assistant)
- 2009: Universitario de Beni
- 2010: Primero de Mayo
- 2010: Pedro Marbán
- 2011: Real Mamoré
- 2011: Huanuni
- 2012: Primero de Mayo
- 2012–2013: Huanuni
- 2014–2015: Huanuni
- 2016: Huanuni
- 2017–2018: Huanuni
- 2019: Huanuni
- 2021: San José
- 2021: San José
- 2021: Deportivo Shalon
- 2022–2023: Totora Real Oruro
- * Club domestic league appearances and goals

Domingo Alberto Sánchez (born 5 November 1972) is an Argentine football manager and former player.

Sánchez was a Defensa y Justicia youth graduate, but spent the most of his senior career in Bolivia. After retiring he became a manager, and managed mostly in the Copa Simón Bolívar and regional leagues. In the Bolivian Primera División, he was in charge of Destroyers in 2007, Real Mamoré in 2011, and San José for two periods in 2021.
