= Academia del Balompié Boliviano =

Bolivian football club

ABB
- Full name: Academia del Balompié Boliviano
- Nickname: La Academia
- Founded: 28 June 1985; 41 years ago
- Ground: Estadio Municipal de El Alto; El Alto, Bolivia
- Capacity: 23,000
- President: Isaac Mollinedo
- Manager: Víctor Hugo Mamani
- League: División Profesional
- 2025: División Profesional, 15th of 16
Home colours	Away colours

Academia del Balompié Boliviano, commonly known as ABB, is a Bolivian professional football club based in La Paz. Founded in 1985, they play in the División Profesional. The club's home base is Estadio Hernando Siles.

== History ==
Founded on 28 June 1985 by Isaac Mollinedo and David Condori, the club was initially named Asociación Banco do Brasil and had the same colours as the Brazil national football team. The club was subsequently renamed to Academia del Balompié Boliviano, and had as first goal to help the development of young players in the La Paz region.

In 2013, ABB won the year's Copa Bolivia, winning promotion to the Liga Nacional B. In the 2013–14 Nacional B, however, the club was eliminated in the first stage, and later returned to the regional leagues.

In the 2024 Copa Simón Bolívar, ABB reached the finals of the competition, and achieved a first-ever promotion to the Primera División after defeating CDT Real Oruro 3–2 on aggregate.

== Honours ==
- Copa Simón Bolívar: 2024

== Current squad ==
As of 21 April 2026

Note: Flags indicate national team as defined under FIFA eligibility rules; some limited exceptions apply. Players may hold more than one non-FIFA nationality.

No.	Pos.	Nation	Player
1	GK	PER	Aldair Riascos
2	DF	ECU	Jean Riascos
3	MF	BOL	Alejandro Chumacero
5	DF	BOL	Sebastián Claure
6	MF	BOL	Andres Guillermo
7	MF	BOL	Layonel Figueroa
9	FW	PAN	Jair Catuy
10	FW	BOL	Emanuel Paniagua
11	FW	COL	Juan Fajardo
14	DF	BOL	Carlos Jemio
16	MF	BOL	Marco Salazar
17	MF	VEN	Rodderyck Perozo
20	MF	BOL	Isaac Mollinedo
21	MF	BOL	José Herrera
22	DF	BOL	Sebastián Reyes

No.	Pos.	Nation	Player
23	GK	BOL	Santiago Delgadillo
24	FW	BOL	Jairo Rojas
25	GK	BOL	Jairo Cuéllar
27	FW	BOL	Freddy Abastoflor
29	FW	BOL	Alejandro Camacho
30	MF	BOL	Alejandro Bejarano
31	GK	BOL	Bryan Espinoza
33	DF	BOL	Fabio Zamora
34	DF	BOL	Denilson Gutiérrez
35	MF	BOL	Adriel Guillermo
55	DF	ARG	Augusto Seimandi
75	DF	BOL	Denilson Valda
—	MF	CIV	Nessemon Biafri
—	FW	CGO	Dieu Ebengue
—	FW	CGO	Chadrack Ngantsui

== Managers ==
- (Bolivia) Luis Mollinedo (2011–2021)
- (Argentina) Guillermo Gonzáles (2021)
- (Bolivia) Luis Mollinedo (2022–2023)
- (Bolivia) Julio Quinteros (2024)
- (Bolivia) David Condori (2024)
- (Bolivia) Julio Quinteros (2025)
- (Paraguay) Pablo Godoy (2025)
- (Brazil) João Paulo Barros (2025–)
