= Alex Pallarés =

Spanish football manager

Personal information
- Full name: Alexandre Pallarés Piquer
- Date of birth: 26 May 1979 (age 47)
- Place of birth: Barcelona, Spain

Youth career
- Years: Team
- Onda

Managerial career
- 1998–2001: Onda (youth)
- 2001–2006: Villarreal (youth)
- 2006–2008: Aspire Academy
- 2008–2010: Villarreal (youth)
- 2010–2011: Levante (youth)
- 2012–2014: Rubin Kazan U21
- 2014–2015: Al Jazira U21
- 2016: Atlético Venezuela
- 2017–2018: Atlético Venezuela
- 2018: Deportivo Táchira
- 2019–2020: Los Barrios
- 2020: Gandía
- 2021: Real Potosí
- 2022: Deportivo Táchira
- 2022–2023: Bilbao Athletic
- 2024–2025: Macará

Alexandre "Alex" Pallarés Piquer (born 26 May 1979) is a Spanish football manager.

== Career ==
Born in Barcelona, Catalonia, Pallarés moved to Valencia at an early age. After suffering an injury at the age of 19 while playing for CD Onda, the club offered him to coach the under-17 squad while recovering. He subsequently retired and started a managerial career.

Pallarés continued to work in the youth categories, having spells at Villarreal CF, Aspire Academy, Levante UD, FC Rubin Kazan and Al Jazira Club. On 23 May 2016, he was named manager of Venezuelan side Atlético Venezuela for the remainder of the season.

On 24 November 2016, after finishing second in the Clausura and helping his side qualify to the 2017 Copa Sudamericana, Pallarés resigned for personal reasons. He returned to the club the following 30 May, but left on a mutual agreement on 21 March 2018.

On 23 May 2018, Pallarés was appointed as Deportivo Táchira's manager, but resigned on 20 November, again for personal reasons. On 3 July of the following year, he took over UD Los Barrios in his country's Tercera División, but resigned on 9 January 2020.

On 6 October 2020, Pallarés was appointed at the helm of CF Gandía in the regional leagues. He was sacked on 25 November, after only one win in six matches, and returned to South America the following 5 January to take over Real Potosí; on 8 February, however, he had to step down due to health issues.

Pallarés returned to Táchira on 24 December 2021, in the place of Juan Domingo Tolisano. He left on a mutual agreement the following 19 August.

On 22 November 2022, Pallarés returned to his home country after being named manager of Bilbao Athletic in the Primera Federación. He left the following 22 May, after their relegation.

On 21 November 2023, Pallarés returned to South America after taking over Macará, newly promoted to the Ecuadorian Serie A. He left the club by mutual consent on 14 April 2025.
