= Royal Pari F.C. =

Bolivian football club

Royal Pari
- Full name: Royal Pari Fútbol Club
- Nickname: Los Inmobiliarios
- Founded: 2002; 24 years ago
- Ground: Estadio Ramón Tahuichi Aguilera
- Capacity: 38,000
- Owner: Grupo SION
- Chairman: Mario Chávez Méndez
- Manager: David de la Torre
- League: ACF Primera A
- 2024: División Profesional, 15th of 16 (excluded and relegated)
- Website: www.royalparifc.bo
Home colours	Away colours	Third colours

Royal Pari Fútbol Club, best known as Royal Pari, is a Bolivian football club based in Santa Cruz de la Sierra. Founded in 2002, it plays in the Santa Cruz Football Association Championship following relegation from the Bolivian Primera División in the 2024 season.

== History ==
The club was founded in 2002 in El Pari neighborhood in Santa Cruz de la Sierra, taking its name from it. It entered the Santa Cruz Association Championships, reaching the association's Primera B (third tier) in 2006 but being relegated after finishing last in the relegation tournament. Royal Pari returned to Primera B in 2009 and stayed in this division until 2012, when it was promoted to the ACF's Primera A. The club had poor results in its first season in the competition, getting only 23 points in 38 matches and conceding 80 goals.

On 14 September 2013, the club was purchased by the Grupo SION, and returned to the ACF's Primera A after just one season by winning the Primera B championship. In their return to the Primera A for the 2014–15 season, the club established an unbeaten streak of 12 matches and ended up as runners-up after losing a tiebreaker match to Guabirá, thus qualifying for the Copa Bolivia, which was held in Santa Cruz de la Sierra. The club finished in first place of its group after beating Deportivo Arauco Prado and qualified for the Liga Nacional B.

The 2015–16 season was Royal Pari's first appearance in the Nacional B, in which they were eliminated from the semifinal stage on goals scored after losing to Universitario de Tarija. Royal Pari returned to the Primera A championship for the 2016–17 season, finishing as runners-up in the first stage and in fifth place in the second stage. Since Destroyers had won both stages and had become champions as a result, the runners-up of both stages had to play for the second berth into the national second tier championship, now the Copa Simón Bolívar. In that tiebreaker, Royal Pari beat Real América and qualified for the competition along with Destroyers.

For the 2017 Copa Simón Bolívar, Royal Pari was placed in a group with the representatives from the departments of Beni, Pando, and fellow Santa Cruz representative Destroyers. After an outstanding campaign in this stage, in which it earned 24 points in 10 matches, it qualified to the semifinals where they faced Atlético Bermejo from the department of Tarija. The first leg was won by Royal Pari by a score of 1–0, while the second leg in Bermejo ended in a 2–2 draw that qualified the club for the final. In the final, Royal Pari faced Deportivo Kala from Oruro, with whom it drew both legs, forcing a tiebreaker match played in Sucre which was won by Royal Pari by a 6–2 score, thus earning its first ever promotion to the División Profesional.

In their first season in Bolivia's top tier and led by Peruvian manager Roberto Mosquera, Royal Pari managed to end in third place in the Torneo Clausura after leading the tournament for several matches and having a chance to win it on their last game against the eventual champions San José, and fifth place in the aggregate table, performance which was enough to assure them a berth into the 2019 Copa Sudamericana, the first time the club qualified for an international competition. In their international debut, Royal Pari defeated Monagas from Venezuela on penalties and Macará from Ecuador on away goals in the first two rounds of the competition before being knocked out in the round of 16 by Colombian club La Equidad.

Royal Pari played in Primera División until the 2024 season, in which they placed second-from-bottom in the aggregate table. This forced them to play a relegation play-off against Totora Real Oruro, runners-up in the 2024 Copa Simón Bolívar. Although they won the first leg 4–0, the second leg was abandoned after 81 minutes of play with Totora Real Oruro leading 3–0 as the Royal Pari players were ordered to withdraw from the field in protest for a penalty kick awarded to their rivals. On 6 January 2025, the Bolivian Football Federation's Sports Disciplinary Court (Tribunal de Disciplina Deportiva) ruled the exclusion of Royal Pari from the competition due to the events of the second leg match, as well as their relegation to the Santa Cruz Football Association Championship.

== Supporters ==
The club began to gain followers among evangelical Christians, because it was considered a Christian club when in 2013 it passed into the hands of the Sion business group, a company run by Christians. The club also quotes verses from the Bible on its social media.

Being his early evangelical followers, many of them also follow Christian Zionism and are pro-Israel.

Over time, due to its sporting achievements, the club has gained a following outside of the evangelicals, mainly in Santa Cruz.

=== La 12 ===
It is the official group of fans of the club, they stand out for the cleaning of garbage that their members do at club matches.

== Current squad ==
As of 21 December 2020

Note: Flags indicate national team as defined under FIFA eligibility rules; some limited exceptions apply. Players may hold more than one non-FIFA nationality.

No.	Pos.	Nation	Player
1	GK	BOL	Jorge Araúz
3	DF	BOL	Jefferson Virreira
4	DF	BOL	Harry Céspedes
5	MF	ARG	Luciano Ursino
6	DF	ARG	Mariano Brau
7	MF	BRA	Thiago Ribeiro
8	MF	BOL	José Luis Chávez
9	FW	ESP	Iker Hernández
10	FW	BRA	Bruno Silva
11	FW	HON	Rubilio Castillo
12	GK	BOL	Germán Arauz
13	GK	BOL	Diego Méndez
14	MF	BOL	Marco Barrios
15	DF	BOL	Ariel Juárez
16	MF	BOL	Mirko Tomianovic

No.	Pos.	Nation	Player
17	FW	BOL	Rodrigo Cabrera
18	FW	BOL	David Ribera
19	FW	BOL	Layonel Figueroa
20	FW	BOL	Rodrigo Vargas
21	MF	BOL	Ricardo Orihuela
22	FW	BOL	Bruno Miranda
23	MF	BOL	Richard Peñaranda
24	DF	BOL	Guimer Justiniano
27	MF	BOL	Omar Siles
30	MF	BOL	Damián Lizio
31	FW	BOL	Raúl Medeiros
32	DF	BOL	Walter Antelo
33	FW	BOL	Carlos Saucedo
36	MF	BOL	Brandon Guzman
—	GK	BOL	Daniel Vaca

== Honours ==
=== Domestic ===
- Copa Simón Bolívar
  - Winners (1): 2017
- ACF Primera A
  - Runners-up (2): 2014–15, 2016–17
