= 2021 Copa América squads =

The 2021 Copa América was an international football tournament held in Brazil from 13 June to 10 July 2021. The ten national teams involved in the tournament were required to register a squad of up to 28 players, including at least three goalkeepers, an increase over the usual number of 23 players allowed. Only players in these squads were eligible to take part in the tournament.

On 22 March 2021, during a virtual meeting of its Council, CONMEBOL confirmed adjustments in the tournament regulations, several of these related to the player rosters, taking into account the conditions imposed by the COVID-19 pandemic.

Initially the ten national teams were required to register a provisional list with up to fifty players and then a final list of 23 players. However, on 28 May 2021, CONMEBOL decided to increase the provisional list up to sixty players and the final list up to 28 players at the request of some national associations. Each national team had to submit its provisional list of up to fifty players to CONMEBOL by 27 April 2021, 18:00 PYT (UTC−4) (Regulations Article 25) and could also register up to ten additional players until 1 June. Taking into consideration the fact that matchdays 7 and 8 of CONMEBOL's FIFA World Cup qualifiers were played only a few days before the start of the tournament, the final list of up to 28 players per national team could be submitted to CONMEBOL by 10 June 2021, 12:00 PYT (UTC−4), three days prior to the opening match of the tournament. All players in the final selection must not have been excluded from the provisional list (Regulations Article 27).

Despite the increase of players in the final lists, teams could still only name a maximum of 23 players on the match list for each tournament fixture (of which twelve were substitutes).

Once the final lists were registered, teams were only permitted to make replacements in cases of serious injuries up to 24 hours before their first match. Teams were also permitted to replace an injured goalkeeper with another at any time during the tournament (Regulations Article 28). In addition, any player with positive PCR tests for SARS-CoV-2 could be replaced before and during the tournament (Regulations Article 30). All substitutes had to have the approval of the CONMEBOL Medical Commission and the replacement players did not need to be in the provisional list.

Before starting the final stage of the tournament, teams were able to replace a total of three players from their final list, with the replacement players coming from the provisional list (Regulations Article 29).

The final lists were published by CONMEBOL on 10 June 2021.

The age listed for each player is as of 13 June 2021, the first day of the tournament. The numbers of caps and goals listed for each player do not include any matches played after the start of the tournament. A flag is included for coaches who are of a different nationality than their own national team.

== Group A ==
=== Argentina ===
Head coach: Lionel Scaloni

Argentina announced their final squad of 28 players on 11 June 2021. A provisional list was not revealed.

No.	Pos.	Player	Date of birth (age)	Caps	Goals	Club
1	GK	Franco Armani	16 October 1986 (aged 34)	15	0	(Argentine Football Association) River Plate
2	DF	Lucas Martínez Quarta	10 May 1996 (aged 25)	6	0	(Italian Football Federation) Fiorentina
3	DF	Nicolás Tagliafico	31 August 1992 (aged 28)	29	0	(Royal Dutch Football Association) Ajax
4	DF	Gonzalo Montiel	1 January 1997 (aged 24)	7	0	(Argentine Football Association) River Plate
5	MF	Leandro Paredes	29 June 1994 (aged 26)	30	4	(French Football Federation) Paris Saint-Germain
6	DF	Germán Pezzella	27 June 1991 (aged 29)	17	2	(Italian Football Federation) Fiorentina
7	MF	Rodrigo De Paul	24 May 1994 (aged 27)	23	0	(Italian Football Federation) Udinese
8	DF	Marcos Acuña	28 October 1991 (aged 29)	29	0	(Royal Spanish Football Federation) Sevilla
9	FW	Sergio Agüero (vice-captain)	2 June 1988 (aged 33)	97	41	(The Football Association) Manchester City
10	FW	Lionel Messi (captain)	24 June 1987 (aged 33)	144	72	(Royal Spanish Football Federation) Barcelona
11	MF	Ángel Di María	14 February 1988 (aged 33)	105	20	(French Football Federation) Paris Saint-Germain
12	GK	Agustín Marchesín	16 March 1988 (aged 33)	8	0	(Portuguese Football Federation) Porto
13	DF	Cristian Romero	27 April 1998 (aged 23)	2	1	(Italian Football Federation) Atalanta
14	MF	Exequiel Palacios	5 October 1998 (aged 22)	8	0	(German Football Association) Bayer Leverkusen
15	FW	Nicolás González	6 April 1998 (aged 23)	6	2	(German Football Association) VfB Stuttgart
16	FW	Joaquín Correa	13 August 1994 (aged 26)	5	2	(Italian Football Federation) Lazio
17	MF	Nicolás Domínguez	28 June 1998 (aged 22)	8	1	(Italian Football Federation) Bologna
18	MF	Guido Rodríguez	12 April 1994 (aged 27)	10	0	(Royal Spanish Football Federation) Real Betis
19	DF	Nicolás Otamendi	12 February 1988 (aged 33)	75	4	(Portuguese Football Federation) Benfica
20	MF	Giovani Lo Celso	9 April 1996 (aged 25)	24	2	(The Football Association) Tottenham Hotspur
21	FW	Ángel Correa	9 March 1995 (aged 26)	13	2	(Royal Spanish Football Federation) Atlético Madrid
22	FW	Lautaro Martínez	22 August 1997 (aged 23)	23	11	(Italian Football Federation) Internazionale
23	GK	Emiliano Martínez	2 September 1992 (aged 28)	2	0	(The Football Association) Aston Villa
24	MF	Alejandro "Papu" Gómez	15 February 1988 (aged 33)	5	1	(Royal Spanish Football Federation) Sevilla
25	DF	Lisandro Martínez	18 January 1998 (aged 23)	2	0	(Royal Dutch Football Association) Ajax
26	DF	Nahuel Molina	6 April 1998 (aged 23)	1	0	(Italian Football Federation) Udinese
27	FW	Julián Alvarez	31 January 2000 (aged 21)	1	0	(Argentine Football Association) River Plate
28	GK	Juan Musso	6 May 1994 (aged 27)	1	0	(Italian Football Federation) Udinese

=== Bolivia ===
Head coach: (Venezuela) César Farías

Bolivia announced their final squad of 27 players on 10 June 2021. A provisional list was not revealed.

No.	Pos.	Player	Date of birth (age)	Caps	Goals	Club
1	GK	Carlos Lampe	17 March 1987 (aged 34)	36	0	(Bolivian Football Federation) Always Ready
2	DF	Jairo Quinteros	7 February 2001 (aged 20)	1	0	(Bolivian Football Federation) Bolívar
3	DF	José Sagredo	10 March 1994 (aged 27)	25	0	(Bolivian Football Federation) The Strongest
4	DF	Luis Haquin	15 November 1997 (aged 23)	18	1	(Football Federation of Chile) Melipilla
5	DF	Adrián Jusino	9 July 1992 (aged 28)	13	0	(Hellenic Football Federation) AEL
6	MF	Leonel Justiniano	2 July 1992 (aged 28)	30	1	(Bolivian Football Federation) Bolívar
7	MF	Juan Carlos Arce	10 April 1985 (aged 36)	76	12	(Bolivian Football Federation) Always Ready
8	DF	Diego Bejarano	24 August 1991 (aged 29)	30	3	(Bolivian Football Federation) Bolívar
9	FW	Marcelo Moreno (captain)	18 June 1987 (aged 33)	83	25	(Brazilian Football Confederation) Cruzeiro
10	FW	Henry Vaca	27 January 1998 (aged 23)	9	0	(Bolivian Football Federation) Oriente Petrolero
11	FW	Rodrigo Ramallo	14 October 1990 (aged 30)	20	3	(Bolivian Football Federation) Always Ready
12	GK	Rubén Cordano	16 October 1998 (aged 22)	1	0	(Bolivian Football Federation) Bolívar
13	MF	Diego Wayar	15 October 1993 (aged 27)	22	0	(Bolivian Football Federation) The Strongest
14	MF	Moisés Villarroel	7 September 1998 (aged 22)	2	0	(Bolivian Football Federation) Jorge Wilstermann
15	MF	Boris Céspedes	19 June 1995 (aged 25)	4	1	(Swiss Football Association) Servette
16	MF	Erwin Saavedra	22 February 1996 (aged 25)	25	2	(Bolivian Football Federation) Bolívar
17	MF	Roberto Fernández	12 July 1999 (aged 21)	7	0	(Bolivian Football Federation) Bolívar
18	FW	Gilbert Álvarez	4 July 1992 (aged 28)	28	5	(Bolivian Football Federation) Jorge Wilstermann
19	DF	Enrique Flores	1 February 1994 (aged 27)	13	0	(Bolivian Football Federation) Always Ready
20	MF	Ramiro Vaca	1 July 1999 (aged 21)	8	1	(Bolivian Football Federation) The Strongest
21	MF	Erwin Sánchez	23 July 1992 (aged 28)	5	0	(Bolivian Football Federation) Blooming
22	MF	Danny Bejarano	3 January 1994 (aged 27)	27	0	(Hellenic Football Federation) Lamia
23	GK	Javier Rojas	14 January 1996 (aged 25)	1	0	(Bolivian Football Federation) Bolívar
24	FW	Jaume Cuéllar	23 August 2001 (aged 19)	0	0	(Italian Football Federation) SPAL
25	FW	Jeyson Chura	3 February 2002 (aged 19)	0	0	(Bolivian Football Federation) The Strongest
26	DF	Luis René Barboza	3 April 1993 (aged 28)	0	0	(Bolivian Football Federation) Aurora
27	DF	Óscar Ribera	10 February 1992 (aged 29)	13	0	(Bolivian Football Federation) Blooming

=== Uruguay ===
Head coach: Óscar Tabárez

Uruguay announced their final squad of 26 players on 10 June 2021. A provisional list was not revealed.

No.	Pos.	Player	Date of birth (age)	Caps	Goals	Club
1	GK	Fernando Muslera	16 June 1986 (aged 34)	118	0	(Turkish Football Federation) Galatasaray
2	DF	José Giménez	20 January 1995 (aged 26)	62	8	(Royal Spanish Football Federation) Atlético Madrid
3	DF	Diego Godín (captain)	16 February 1986 (aged 35)	141	8	(Italian Football Federation) Cagliari
4	DF	Ronald Araújo	7 March 1999 (aged 22)	1	0	(Royal Spanish Football Federation) Barcelona
5	MF	Matías Vecino	24 August 1991 (aged 29)	43	3	(Italian Football Federation) Internazionale
6	MF	Rodrigo Bentancur	25 June 1997 (aged 23)	34	0	(Italian Football Federation) Juventus
7	MF	Nicolás de la Cruz	1 June 1997 (aged 24)	5	0	(Argentine Football Association) River Plate
8	MF	Nahitan Nández	28 December 1995 (aged 25)	36	0	(Italian Football Federation) Cagliari
9	FW	Luis Suárez	24 January 1987 (aged 34)	118	63	(Royal Spanish Football Federation) Atlético Madrid
10	MF	Giorgian de Arrascaeta	1 June 1994 (aged 27)	26	3	(Brazilian Football Confederation) Flamengo
11	DF	Camilo Cándido	2 June 1995 (aged 26)	0	0	(Uruguayan Football Association) Nacional
12	GK	Martín Campaña	29 May 1989 (aged 32)	9	0	(Saudi Arabian Football Federation) Al-Batin
13	DF	Giovanni González	20 September 1994 (aged 26)	10	0	(Uruguayan Football Association) Peñarol
14	MF	Lucas Torreira	11 February 1996 (aged 25)	28	0	(Royal Spanish Football Federation) Atlético Madrid
15	MF	Federico Valverde	22 July 1998 (aged 22)	24	2	(Royal Spanish Football Federation) Real Madrid
16	MF	Brian Rodríguez	20 May 2000 (aged 21)	10	3	(Royal Spanish Football Federation) Almería
17	DF	Matías Viña	9 November 1997 (aged 23)	11	0	(Brazilian Football Confederation) Palmeiras
18	FW	Maxi Gómez	14 August 1996 (aged 24)	19	3	(Royal Spanish Football Federation) Valencia
19	DF	Sebastián Coates	7 October 1990 (aged 30)	40	1	(Portuguese Football Federation) Sporting CP
20	FW	Jonathan Rodríguez	6 July 1993 (aged 27)	26	3	(Mexican Football Federation) Cruz Azul
21	FW	Edinson Cavani	14 February 1987 (aged 34)	118	51	(The Football Association) Manchester United
22	DF	Martín Cáceres	7 April 1987 (aged 34)	104	4	(Italian Football Federation) Fiorentina
23	GK	Sergio Rochet	23 March 1993 (aged 28)	0	0	(Uruguayan Football Association) Nacional
24	MF	Fernando Gorriarán	27 November 1994 (aged 26)	1	0	(Mexican Football Federation) Santos Laguna
25	FW	Facundo Torres	13 April 2000 (aged 21)	2	0	(Uruguayan Football Association) Peñarol
26	FW	Brian Ocampo	25 June 1999 (aged 21)	0	0	(Uruguayan Football Association) Nacional

=== Chile ===
Head coach: (Uruguay) Martín Lasarte

Chile announced their final squad of 28 players on 10 June 2021. A provisional list was not revealed. After the team's last group stage match, defender Guillermo Maripán withdrew injured and was replaced by Diego Valencia on 27 June.

No.	Pos.	Player	Date of birth (age)	Caps	Goals	Club
1	GK	Claudio Bravo (captain)	13 April 1983 (aged 38)	128	0	(Royal Spanish Football Federation) Real Betis
2	DF	Eugenio Mena	18 July 1988 (aged 32)	58	3	(Argentine Football Association) Racing
3	DF	Guillermo Maripán (until 26 June)	6 May 1994 (aged 27)	28	2	(French Football Federation) Monaco
3	FW	Diego Valencia (from 27 June)	14 January 2000 (aged 21)	0	0	(Football Federation of Chile) Universidad Católica
4	DF	Mauricio Isla	12 June 1988 (aged 33)	120	4	(Brazilian Football Confederation) Flamengo
5	DF	Enzo Roco	16 August 1992 (aged 28)	25	1	(Turkish Football Federation) Fatih Karagümrük
6	DF	Francisco Sierralta	6 May 1997 (aged 24)	5	0	(The Football Association) Watford
7	MF	César Pinares	23 May 1991 (aged 30)	15	1	(Brazilian Football Confederation) Grêmio
8	MF	Arturo Vidal	22 May 1987 (aged 34)	119	32	(Italian Football Federation) Internazionale
9	FW	Jean Meneses	16 March 1993 (aged 28)	7	2	(Mexican Football Federation) León
10	FW	Alexis Sánchez	19 December 1988 (aged 32)	138	46	(Italian Football Federation) Internazionale
11	FW	Eduardo Vargas	20 November 1989 (aged 31)	95	38	(Brazilian Football Confederation) Atlético Mineiro
12	GK	Gabriel Arias	13 September 1987 (aged 33)	13	0	(Argentine Football Association) Racing
13	MF	Erick Pulgar	15 January 1994 (aged 27)	28	2	(Italian Football Federation) Fiorentina
14	MF	Pablo Galdames	30 December 1996 (aged 24)	4	0	(Argentine Football Association) Vélez Sarsfield
15	DF	Daniel González	20 February 2002 (aged 19)	1	0	(Football Federation of Chile) Santiago Wanderers
16	FW	Felipe Mora	2 August 1993 (aged 27)	8	1	(United States Soccer Federation) Portland Timbers
17	DF	Gary Medel	3 August 1987 (aged 33)	129	7	(Italian Football Federation) Bologna
18	DF	Sebastián Vegas	4 December 1996 (aged 24)	12	1	(Mexican Football Federation) Monterrey
19	MF	Tomás Alarcón	19 January 1999 (aged 22)	3	0	(Football Federation of Chile) O'Higgins
20	MF	Charles Aránguiz	17 April 1989 (aged 32)	82	7	(German Football Association) Bayer Leverkusen
21	FW	Carlos Palacios	20 July 2000 (aged 20)	3	0	(Brazilian Football Confederation) Internacional
22	FW	Ben Brereton	18 April 1999 (aged 22)	0	0	(The Football Association) Blackburn Rovers
23	GK	Gabriel Castellón	8 September 1993 (aged 27)	0	0	(Football Federation of Chile) Huachipato
24	FW	Luciano Arriagada	20 April 2002 (aged 19)	0	0	(Football Federation of Chile) Colo-Colo
25	MF	Marcelino Núñez	1 March 2000 (aged 21)	0	0	(Football Federation of Chile) Universidad Católica
26	FW	Clemente Montes	25 April 2001 (aged 20)	1	0	(Football Federation of Chile) Universidad Católica
27	MF	Pablo Aránguiz	17 March 1997 (aged 24)	0	0	(Football Federation of Chile) Universidad de Chile
28	MF	Claudio Baeza	23 December 1993 (aged 27)	8	0	(Mexican Football Federation) Toluca

=== Paraguay ===
Head coach: (Argentina) Eduardo Berizzo

Paraguay announced their final squad of 28 players on 10 June 2021. A provisional list was not revealed.

No.	Pos.	Player	Date of birth (age)	Caps	Goals	Club
1	GK	Antony Silva	27 February 1984 (aged 37)	34	0	(Mexican Football Federation) Puebla
2	DF	Robert Rojas	30 April 1996 (aged 25)	7	1	(Argentine Football Association) River Plate
3	DF	Omar Alderete	26 December 1996 (aged 24)	5	0	(German Football Association) Hertha BSC
4	DF	Fabián Balbuena	23 August 1991 (aged 29)	18	0	(The Football Association) West Ham United
5	MF	Gastón Giménez	27 July 1991 (aged 29)	6	1	(United States Soccer Federation) Chicago Fire
6	DF	Júnior Alonso	9 February 1993 (aged 28)	33	1	(Brazilian Football Confederation) Atlético Mineiro
7	FW	Carlos González	3 February 1993 (aged 28)	1	0	(Mexican Football Federation) UANL
8	MF	Richard Sánchez	29 March 1996 (aged 25)	15	1	(Mexican Football Federation) América
9	FW	Gabriel Ávalos	12 October 1990 (aged 30)	2	0	(Argentine Football Association) Argentinos Juniors
10	MF	Miguel Almirón	10 February 1994 (aged 27)	31	2	(The Football Association) Newcastle United
11	FW	Ángel Romero	4 July 1992 (aged 28)	26	6	(Argentine Football Association) San Lorenzo
12	GK	Alfredo Aguilar	18 July 1988 (aged 32)	2	0	(Paraguayan Football Association) Olimpia
13	DF	Alberto Espínola	8 February 1991 (aged 30)	4	0	(Paraguayan Football Association) Cerro Porteño
14	MF	Andrés Cubas	22 May 1996 (aged 25)	3	0	(French Football Federation) Nîmes
15	DF	Gustavo Gómez (captain)	6 May 1993 (aged 28)	47	3	(Brazilian Football Confederation) Palmeiras
16	MF	Ángel Cardozo Lucena	19 October 1994 (aged 26)	6	0	(Paraguayan Football Association) Cerro Porteño
17	MF	Kaku	11 January 1995 (aged 26)	6	3	(Saudi Arabian Football Federation) Al-Taawoun
18	FW	Braian Samudio	23 December 1995 (aged 25)	5	0	(Turkish Football Federation) Çaykur Rizespor
19	DF	Santiago Arzamendia	5 May 1998 (aged 23)	10	0	(Paraguayan Football Association) Cerro Porteño
20	FW	Antonio Bareiro	24 April 1989 (aged 32)	6	1	(Paraguayan Football Association) Libertad
21	MF	Óscar Romero	4 July 1992 (aged 28)	48	4	(Argentine Football Association) San Lorenzo
22	GK	Gerardo Ortiz	25 March 1989 (aged 32)	0	0	(Colombian Football Federation) Once Caldas
23	MF	Mathías Villasanti	24 January 1997 (aged 24)	10	0	(Paraguayan Football Association) Cerro Porteño
24	DF	David Martínez	21 January 1998 (aged 23)	0	0	(Argentine Football Association) River Plate
25	MF	Braian Ojeda	27 June 2000 (aged 20)	0	0	(Paraguayan Football Association) Olimpia
26	MF	Robert Piris Da Motta	26 July 1994 (aged 26)	6	0	(Brazilian Football Confederation) Flamengo
27	MF	Jorge Morel	22 January 1998 (aged 23)	4	0	(Paraguayan Football Association) Guaraní
28	FW	Julio Enciso	23 January 2004 (aged 17)	0	0	(Paraguayan Football Association) Libertad

== Group B ==
=== Brazil ===
Head coach: Tite

Brazil announced their final squad of 24 players on 9 June 2021. A provisional list was not revealed. After the team's second group stage match, defender Felipe withdrew injured and was replaced by Léo Ortiz on 26 June.

No.	Pos.	Player	Date of birth (age)	Caps	Goals	Club
1	GK	Alisson	2 October 1992 (aged 28)	45	0	(The Football Association) Liverpool
2	DF	Danilo	15 July 1991 (aged 29)	31	1	(Italian Football Federation) Juventus
3	DF	Thiago Silva (captain)	22 September 1984 (aged 36)	93	7	(The Football Association) Chelsea
4	DF	Marquinhos	14 May 1994 (aged 27)	53	2	(French Football Federation) Paris Saint-Germain
5	MF	Casemiro	23 February 1992 (aged 29)	50	3	(Royal Spanish Football Federation) Real Madrid
6	DF	Alex Sandro	26 January 1991 (aged 30)	25	1	(Italian Football Federation) Juventus
7	FW	Richarlison	10 May 1997 (aged 24)	25	9	(The Football Association) Everton
8	MF	Fred	5 March 1993 (aged 28)	13	0	(The Football Association) Manchester United
9	FW	Gabriel Jesus	3 April 1997 (aged 24)	43	18	(The Football Association) Manchester City
10	FW	Neymar	5 February 1992 (aged 29)	105	66	(French Football Federation) Paris Saint-Germain
11	MF	Éverton Ribeiro	10 April 1989 (aged 32)	10	0	(Brazilian Football Confederation) Flamengo
12	GK	Weverton	13 December 1987 (aged 33)	4	0	(Brazilian Football Confederation) Palmeiras
13	DF	Emerson Royal	14 January 1999 (aged 22)	1	0	(Royal Spanish Football Federation) Real Betis
14	DF	Éder Militão	18 January 1998 (aged 23)	10	0	(Royal Spanish Football Federation) Real Madrid
15	MF	Fabinho	23 October 1993 (aged 27)	13	0	(The Football Association) Liverpool
16	DF	Renan Lodi	8 April 1998 (aged 23)	8	0	(Royal Spanish Football Federation) Atlético Madrid
17	MF	Lucas Paquetá	27 August 1997 (aged 23)	15	3	(French Football Federation) Lyon
18	FW	Vinícius Júnior	12 July 2000 (aged 20)	1	0	(Royal Spanish Football Federation) Real Madrid
19	FW	Everton	22 March 1996 (aged 25)	19	3	(Portuguese Football Federation) Benfica
20	FW	Roberto Firmino	2 October 1991 (aged 29)	50	16	(The Football Association) Liverpool
21	FW	Gabriel Barbosa	30 August 1996 (aged 24)	7	2	(Brazilian Football Confederation) Flamengo
22	DF	Felipe (until 26 June)	16 May 1989 (aged 32)	2	0	(Royal Spanish Football Federation) Atlético Madrid
22	DF	Léo Ortiz (from 26 June)	3 January 1996 (aged 25)	0	0	(Brazilian Football Confederation) Red Bull Bragantino
23	GK	Ederson	17 August 1993 (aged 27)	12	0	(The Football Association) Manchester City
25	MF	Douglas Luiz	9 May 1998 (aged 23)	6	0	(The Football Association) Aston Villa

=== Colombia ===
Head coach: Reinaldo Rueda

Colombia announced their final squad of 28 players on 10 June 2021. A provisional list was not revealed. After the team's first match, Yairo Moreno left the squad on 13 June due to injury. Juan Ferney Otero tested positive for SARS-CoV-2 and was replaced by Frank Fabra on 15 June.

No.	Pos.	Player	Date of birth (age)	Caps	Goals	Club
1	GK	David Ospina (captain)	31 August 1988 (aged 32)	107	0	(Italian Football Federation) Napoli
2	DF	Stefan Medina	14 June 1992 (aged 28)	23	0	(Mexican Football Federation) Monterrey
3	DF	Óscar Murillo	18 April 1988 (aged 33)	17	0	(Mexican Football Federation) Pachuca
4	DF	Carlos Cuesta	9 March 1999 (aged 22)	0	0	(Royal Belgian Football Association) Genk
5	MF	Wilmar Barrios	16 October 1993 (aged 27)	35	0	(Russian Football Union) Zenit Saint Petersburg
6	DF	William Tesillo	2 February 1990 (aged 31)	15	1	(Mexican Football Federation) León
7	FW	Duván Zapata	1 April 1991 (aged 30)	22	4	(Italian Football Federation) Atalanta
8	MF	Gustavo Cuéllar	14 October 1992 (aged 28)	9	1	(Saudi Arabian Football Federation) Al-Hilal Saudi
9	FW	Luis Muriel	16 April 1991 (aged 30)	38	8	(Italian Football Federation) Atalanta
10	MF	Edwin Cardona	8 December 1992 (aged 28)	41	5	(Argentine Football Association) Boca Juniors
11	MF	Juan Cuadrado	26 May 1988 (aged 33)	96	8	(Italian Football Federation) Juventus
12	GK	Camilo Vargas	9 March 1989 (aged 32)	9	0	(Mexican Football Federation) Atlas
13	DF	Yerry Mina	23 September 1994 (aged 26)	28	7	(The Football Association) Everton
14	FW	Luis Díaz	13 January 1997 (aged 24)	18	2	(Portuguese Football Federation) Porto
15	MF	Mateus Uribe	21 March 1991 (aged 30)	30	4	(Portuguese Football Federation) Porto
16	DF	Daniel Muñoz	25 May 1996 (aged 25)	1	0	(Royal Belgian Football Association) Genk
17	MF	Yairo Moreno	4 April 1995 (aged 26)	8	0	(Mexican Football Federation) Pachuca
18	FW	Rafael Santos Borré	15 September 1995 (aged 25)	3	0	(Argentine Football Association) River Plate
19	FW	Miguel Borja	26 January 1993 (aged 28)	12	4	(Colombian Football Federation) Junior
20	FW	Alfredo Morelos	21 June 1996 (aged 24)	10	1	(Scottish Football Association) Rangers
21	MF	Sebastián Pérez	29 March 1993 (aged 28)	8	1	(Portuguese Football Federation) Boavista
22	GK	Aldair Quintana	11 July 1994 (aged 26)	0	0	(Colombian Football Federation) Atlético Nacional
23	DF	Davinson Sánchez	12 June 1996 (aged 25)	34	0	(The Football Association) Tottenham Hotspur
24	DF	Jhon Lucumí	26 June 1998 (aged 22)	4	0	(Royal Belgian Football Association) Genk
25	MF	Baldomero Perlaza	25 June 1992 (aged 28)	0	0	(Colombian Football Federation) Atlético Nacional
26	DF	Frank Fabra	22 February 1991 (aged 30)	22	1	(Argentine Football Association) Boca Juniors
27	MF	Jaminton Campaz	24 May 2000 (aged 21)	0	0	(Colombian Football Federation) Deportes Tolima
28	FW	Yimmi Chará	2 April 1991 (aged 30)	10	1	(United States Soccer Federation) Portland Timbers

=== Venezuela ===
Head coach: (Portugal) José Peseiro

Venezuela's 49-man provisional list was announced on 12 and 13 May 2021. The final squad of 28 players was announced on 10 June 2021. On 12 June 2021, CONMEBOL and the Venezuelan Football Federation reported that eleven members of its delegation, eight of them footballers, had tested positive for SARS-CoV-2. Consequently, fifteen additional players were called up to join the squad. Midfielder and captain Tomás Rincón and goalkeeper Rafael Romo tested positive for SARS-CoV-2 and were replaced by Francisco La Mantía and Luis Romero respectively on 12 June. After the team's first match, defender Jhon Chancellor and midfielder Jhon Murillo tested positive for SARS-CoV-2 and were replaced by José Manuel Velázquez and Jan Carlos Hurtado respectively.

No.	Pos.	Player	Date of birth (age)	Caps	Goals	Club
1	GK	Wuilker Faríñez	15 February 1998 (aged 23)	26	0	(French Football Federation) Lens
2	DF	Nahuel Ferraresi	19 November 1998 (aged 22)	4	0	(Portuguese Football Federation) Moreirense
3	DF	Mikel Villanueva	14 April 1993 (aged 28)	27	2	(Portuguese Football Federation) Santa Clara
4	DF	Jhon Chancellor (until 16 June)	2 January 1992 (aged 29)	20	1	(Italian Football Federation) Brescia
4	DF	José Manuel Velázquez (from 17 June)	8 September 1990 (aged 30)	25	3	(Portuguese Football Federation) Arouca
5	MF	Júnior Moreno	20 July 1993 (aged 27)	24	1	(United States Soccer Federation) D.C. United
6	MF	Yangel Herrera	7 January 1998 (aged 23)	21	2	(Royal Spanish Football Federation) Granada
7	MF	Jefferson Savarino	11 November 1996 (aged 24)	18	1	(Brazilian Football Confederation) Atlético Mineiro
8	DF	Francisco La Mantía	24 February 1996 (aged 25)	1	0	(Venezuelan Football Federation) Deportivo La Guaira
9	FW	Fernando Aristeguieta (captain)	9 April 1992 (aged 29)	21	1	(Mexican Football Federation) Mazatlán
10	MF	Yeferson Soteldo	30 June 1997 (aged 23)	18	1	(Canadian Soccer Association) Toronto FC
11	FW	Sergio Córdova	9 August 1997 (aged 23)	10	0	(German Football Association) Arminia Bielefeld
12	GK	Joel Graterol	13 February 1997 (aged 24)	2	0	(Colombian Football Federation) América de Cali
13	MF	José Andrés Martínez	7 September 1994 (aged 26)	1	0	(United States Soccer Federation) Philadelphia Union
14	DF	Luis Mago	15 September 1994 (aged 26)	12	2	(Football Federation of Chile) Universidad de Chile
15	MF	Jhon Murillo (until 16 June)	21 November 1995 (aged 25)	31	4	(Portuguese Football Federation) Tondela
15	FW	Jan Carlos Hurtado (from 17 June)	5 March 2000 (aged 21)	3	0	(Brazilian Football Confederation) Red Bull Bragantino
16	DF	Roberto Rosales	20 November 1988 (aged 32)	86	1	(Royal Spanish Football Federation) Leganés
17	FW	Josef Martínez	19 May 1993 (aged 28)	53	11	(United States Soccer Federation) Atlanta United FC
18	MF	Rómulo Otero	9 November 1992 (aged 28)	39	6	(Brazilian Football Confederation) Corinthians
19	FW	Jhonder Cádiz	29 July 1995 (aged 25)	4	0	(United States Soccer Federation) Nashville SC
20	DF	Ronald Hernández	21 September 1997 (aged 23)	17	0	(United States Soccer Federation) Atlanta United FC
21	DF	Alexander González	13 September 1992 (aged 28)	50	1	(Royal Spanish Football Federation) Málaga
22	GK	Luis Romero	16 November 1990 (aged 30)	0	0	(Venezuelan Football Federation) Portuguesa
23	MF	Cristian Cásseres Jr.	20 January 2000 (aged 21)	6	0	(United States Soccer Federation) New York Red Bulls
24	MF	Bernaldo Manzano	2 July 1990 (aged 30)	3	0	(Venezuelan Football Federation) Deportivo Lara
25	MF	Richard Celis	23 April 1996 (aged 25)	1	0	(Venezuelan Football Federation) Caracas
26	MF	Edson Castillo	18 May 1994 (aged 27)	0	0	(Venezuelan Football Federation) Caracas
27	DF	Yohán Cumana	8 March 1996 (aged 25)	0	0	(Venezuelan Football Federation) Deportivo La Guaira
28	DF	Adrián Martínez	14 July 1993 (aged 27)	0	0	(Venezuelan Football Federation) Deportivo La Guaira

=== Ecuador ===
Head coach: (Argentina) Gustavo Alfaro

Ecuador announced their final squad of 28 players on 9 June 2021. A provisional list was not revealed. After the team's last group stage match, midfielder Damián Díaz withdrew after testing positive for SARS-CoV-2 and was replaced by Carlos Gruezo on 29 June.

No.	Pos.	Player	Date of birth (age)	Caps	Goals	Club
1	GK	Hernán Galíndez	30 March 1987 (aged 34)	0	0	(Ecuadorian Football Federation) Universidad Católica
2	DF	Félix Torres	11 January 1997 (aged 24)	4	0	(Mexican Football Federation) Santos Laguna
3	DF	Piero Hincapié	9 January 2002 (aged 19)	0	0	(Argentine Football Association) Talleres
4	DF	Robert Arboleda	22 October 1991 (aged 29)	22	2	(Brazilian Football Confederation) São Paulo
5	MF	Dixon Arroyo	1 June 1992 (aged 29)	1	0	(Ecuadorian Football Federation) Emelec
6	MF	Christian Noboa	9 April 1985 (aged 36)	78	4	(Russian Football Union) Sochi
7	DF	Pervis Estupiñán	21 January 1998 (aged 23)	7	1	(Royal Spanish Football Federation) Villarreal
8	MF	Fidel Martínez	15 February 1990 (aged 31)	33	8	(Mexican Football Federation) Tijuana
9	FW	Leonardo Campana	24 July 2000 (aged 20)	6	0	(Portuguese Football Federation) Famalicão
10	MF	Damián Díaz (until 29 June)	1 May 1986 (aged 35)	2	0	(Ecuadorian Football Federation) Barcelona
10	MF	Carlos Gruezo (from 29 June)	19 April 1995 (aged 26)	29	1	(German Football Association) FC Augsburg
11	FW	Michael Estrada	7 April 1996 (aged 25)	15	4	(Mexican Football Federation) Toluca
12	GK	Pedro Ortíz	19 February 1990 (aged 31)	2	0	(Ecuadorian Football Federation) Emelec
13	FW	Enner Valencia	4 November 1989 (aged 31)	57	31	(Turkish Football Federation) Fenerbahçe
14	DF	Xavier Arreaga	28 September 1994 (aged 26)	12	1	(United States Soccer Federation) Seattle Sounders FC
15	FW	Ángel Mena	21 January 1988 (aged 33)	27	6	(Mexican Football Federation) León
16	DF	Mario Pineida	6 July 1992 (aged 28)	9	0	(Ecuadorian Football Federation) Barcelona
17	DF	Ángelo Preciado	18 February 1998 (aged 23)	8	0	(Royal Belgian Football Association) Genk
18	MF	Ayrton Preciado	17 July 1994 (aged 26)	17	1	(Mexican Football Federation) Santos Laguna
19	MF	Gonzalo Plata	11 January 2000 (aged 21)	10	4	(Portuguese Football Federation) Sporting CP
20	MF	Sebas Méndez	26 April 1997 (aged 24)	18	0	(United States Soccer Federation) Orlando City SC
21	MF	Alan Franco	21 August 1998 (aged 22)	9	1	(Brazilian Football Confederation) Atlético Mineiro
22	GK	Alexander Domínguez (captain)	5 June 1987 (aged 34)	59	0	(Argentine Football Association) Vélez Sarsfield
23	MF	Moisés Caicedo	2 November 2001 (aged 19)	5	1	(The Football Association) Brighton & Hove Albion
24	DF	Fernando León	11 April 1993 (aged 28)	3	0	(Ecuadorian Football Federation) Barcelona
25	MF	José Carabalí	19 May 1997 (aged 24)	2	0	(Ecuadorian Football Federation) Universidad Católica
26	FW	Jordy Caicedo	18 November 1997 (aged 23)	2	0	(Bulgarian Football Union) CSKA Sofia
27	DF	Diego Palacios	12 July 1999 (aged 21)	6	0	(United States Soccer Federation) Los Angeles FC
28	DF	José Hurtado	23 December 2001 (aged 19)	0	0	(Ecuadorian Football Federation) Independiente del Valle

=== Peru ===
Head coach: (Argentina) Ricardo Gareca

Peru's 50-man provisional list was announced on 27 April 2021, and was expanded to 60 players on 1 June 2021. The final squad of 26 players was announced on 10 June 2021.

No.	Pos.	Player	Date of birth (age)	Caps	Goals	Club
1	GK	Pedro Gallese (captain)	23 February 1990 (aged 31)	68	0	(United States Soccer Federation) Orlando City SC
2	DF	Luis Abram	27 February 1996 (aged 25)	26	1	(Argentine Football Association) Vélez Sarsfield
3	DF	Aldo Corzo	20 May 1989 (aged 32)	31	0	(Peruvian Football Federation) Universitario
4	DF	Anderson Santamaría	10 January 1992 (aged 29)	17	0	(Mexican Football Federation) Atlas
5	DF	Miguel Araujo	24 October 1994 (aged 26)	19	0	(Royal Dutch Football Association) Emmen
6	DF	Miguel Trauco	25 August 1992 (aged 28)	52	0	(French Football Federation) Saint-Étienne
7	MF	Gerald Távara	25 March 1999 (aged 22)	0	0	(Peruvian Football Federation) Sporting Cristal
8	MF	Sergio Peña	28 September 1995 (aged 25)	10	0	(Royal Dutch Football Association) Emmen
9	FW	Gianluca Lapadula	7 February 1990 (aged 31)	4	0	(Italian Football Federation) Benevento
10	MF	Christian Cueva	23 November 1991 (aged 29)	72	11	(Saudi Arabian Football Federation) Al-Fateh
11	FW	Alex Valera	16 May 1996 (aged 25)	0	0	(Peruvian Football Federation) Universitario
12	GK	Carlos Cáceda	27 September 1991 (aged 29)	6	0	(Peruvian Football Federation) Melgar
13	MF	Renato Tapia	28 July 1995 (aged 25)	58	4	(Royal Spanish Football Federation) Celta Vigo
14	MF	Wilder Cartagena	23 September 1994 (aged 26)	6	0	(Argentine Football Association) Godoy Cruz
15	DF	Christian Ramos	4 November 1988 (aged 32)	77	3	(Peruvian Football Federation) Universidad César Vallejo
16	DF	Marcos López	20 November 1999 (aged 21)	6	0	(United States Soccer Federation) San Jose Earthquakes
17	FW	Luis Iberico	6 February 1998 (aged 23)	1	0	(Peruvian Football Federation) Melgar
18	FW	André Carrillo	14 June 1991 (aged 29)	70	9	(Saudi Arabian Football Federation) Al-Hilal
19	MF	Yoshimar Yotún	7 April 1990 (aged 31)	98	3	(Mexican Football Federation) Cruz Azul
20	FW	Santiago Ormeño	4 February 1994 (aged 27)	0	0	(Mexican Football Federation) Puebla
21	GK	José Carvallo	1 March 1986 (aged 35)	7	0	(Peruvian Football Federation) Universitario
22	DF	Alexander Callens	4 May 1992 (aged 29)	13	1	(United States Soccer Federation) New York City FC
23	MF	Alexis Arias	13 December 1995 (aged 25)	2	0	(Peruvian Football Federation) Melgar
24	MF	Raziel García	15 February 1994 (aged 27)	0	0	(Peruvian Football Federation) Cienciano
25	DF	Renzo Garcés	12 June 1996 (aged 25)	0	0	(Peruvian Football Federation) Universidad César Vallejo
26	DF	Jhilmar Lora	24 October 2000 (aged 20)	0	0	(Peruvian Football Federation) Sporting Cristal

== Statistics ==
=== Age ===
All ages are set to 13 June 2021, the opening day of the tournament.

==== Players ====
- Oldest: (Chile) Claudio Bravo (38 years, 61 days)
- Youngest: (Paraguay) Julio Enciso (17 years, 141 days)

==== Goalkeepers ====
- Oldest: (Chile) Claudio Bravo (38 years, 61 days)
- Youngest: (Bolivia) Rubén Cordano (22 years, 240 days)

==== Captains ====
- Oldest: (Chile) Claudio Bravo (38 years, 61 days)
- Youngest: (Paraguay) Gustavo Gómez (28 years, 38 days)

=== Player representation ===
==== By club ====
Clubs are ordered alphabetically: first by country, then by club name.

Players	Clubs
7	(Argentina) River Plate (Bolivia) Bolívar
6	(Spain) Atlético Madrid
5	(Brazil) Flamengo
4	(Belgium) Genk (Bolivia) Always Ready (Bolivia) The Strongest (Brazil) Atlético Mineiro (France) Paris Saint-Germain (Italy) Fiorentina (Italy) Internazionale (Italy) Juventus (Paraguay) Cerro Porteño (Spain) Real Madrid
3	(Argentina) Vélez Sarsfield (Brazil) Palmeiras (Ecuador) Barcelona (England) Liverpool (England) Manchester City (Italy) Atalanta (Italy) Udinese (Mexico) León (Mexico) Santos Laguna (Peru) Melgar (Peru) Universitario (Portugal) Porto (Spain) Real Betis (Uruguay) Nacional (Venezuela) Deportivo La Guaira
2	(Argentina) Boca Juniors (Argentina) Racing (Argentina) San Lorenzo (Bolivia) Blooming (Bolivia) Jorge Wilstermann; Universidad Católica; Universidad de Chile (Colombia) Atlético Nacional (Ecuador) Emelec (Ecuador) Universidad Católica (England) Aston Villa (England) Everton (England) Manchester United (England) Tottenham Hotspur (Germany) Bayer Leverkusen (Italy) Bologna (Italy) Cagliari (Mexico) Atlas (Mexico) Cruz Azul (Mexico) Monterrey (Mexico) Puebla (Mexico) Toluca (Netherlands) Ajax (Netherlands) Emmen (Paraguay) Libertad (Paraguay) Olimpia (Peru) Sporting Cristal (Peru) Universidad César Vallejo (Portugal) Benfica (Portugal) Sporting CP (Saudi Arabia) Al Hilal (Spain) Barcelona (Spain) Sevilla (United States) Atlanta United FC (United States) Orlando City SC (United States) Portland Timbers (Uruguay) Peñarol (Venezuela) Caracas

==== By club nationality ====
Nations in bold are represented by their national teams in the tournament.

Players	Clubs
27	Italy
23	Spain
21	**Bolivia**; Mexico
20	England
18	**Argentina**
16	**Brazil**; United States
12	Portugal
11	**Peru**
9	**Chile**; France; **Paraguay**
8	**Ecuador**
6	**Colombia**; **Venezuela**
5	Belgium; Germany; Saudi Arabia; **Uruguay**
4	Netherlands; Turkey
2	Greece; Russia
1	Bulgaria; Canada; Scotland; Switzerland

==== By club confederation ====
Players	Clubs
117	UEFA
93	CONMEBOL
38	CONCACAF
5	AFC
0	CAF; OFC
