= 2021 Copa América Group B =

Football tournament group stage

Group B of the 2021 Copa América, also referred to as the North Zone, took place from 13 to 27 June 2021 in Brazil. The group consisted of defending champions and hosts Brazil, former co-hosts Colombia, Venezuela, Ecuador and Peru. It would also have included guests Qatar before their withdrawal on 23 February 2021.

Originally, Group B was scheduled to be played from 13 June to 1 July 2020. However, on 17 March 2020 the tournament was postponed to 2021 due to the COVID-19 pandemic in South America.

On 20 May 2021, due to security concerns amid protests against the government of President Iván Duque Márquez, Colombia was dropped as co-host of the tournament.

== Teams ==
Draw position	Team	Appearance	Previous best performance	FIFA Rankings May 2021
B1	Brazil (hosts)	37th	Winners (1919, 1922, 1949, 1989, 1997, 1999, 2004, 2007, 2019)	3
B2	Colombia	23rd	Winners (2001)	15
B3	Venezuela	19th	Fourth place (2011)	30
B4	Ecuador	29th	Fourth place (1959 (E), 1993)	53
B5	Peru	33rd	Winners (1939, 1975)	27

== Standings ==
Pos	Team	Pld	W	D	L	GF	GA	GD	Pts	Qualification
1	Brazil (H)	4	3	1	0	10	2	+8	10	Advance to knockout stage
2	Peru	4	2	1	1	5	7	−2	7	Advance to knockout stage
3	Colombia	4	1	1	2	3	4	−1	4	Advance to knockout stage
4	Ecuador	4	0	3	1	5	6	−1	3	Advance to knockout stage
5	Venezuela	4	0	2	2	2	6	−4	2	

Source: CONMEBOL
Rules for classification: Tiebreakers
(H) Hosts

In the quarter-finals:

- The winners of Group B, Brazil, advanced to play the fourth-placed team of Group A, Chile.
- The runners-up of Group B, Peru, advanced to play the third-placed team of Group A, Paraguay.
- The third-placed team of Group B, Colombia, advanced to play the runners-up of Group A, Uruguay.
- The fourth-placed team of Group B, Ecuador, advanced to play the winners of Group A, Argentina.

== Matches ==
The original 2020 schedule and kick-off times were announced on 3 December 2019 and 4 March 2020 respectively. The new 2021 schedule was announced on 13 August 2020. Following the withdrawal of Qatar, the shortened schedule was announced on 15 March 2021. The final match schedule with Brazil as host country was announced on 2 June 2021.

=== Matchday 1 ===
==== Brazil vs Venezuela ====
13 June 2021
18:00 BRT (UTC−3)

Brazil	3–0	Venezuela
Marquinhos 23'; Neymar 64' (pen.); Gabriel Barbosa 89'	Report

Estádio Nacional Mané Garrincha, Brasília
Attendance: 0 (Note: Due to the COVID-19 pandemic in South America, the match was played behind closed doors.)
Referee: Esteban Ostojich (Uruguay)

Brazil	Venezuela

GK	1	Alisson Becker
RB	2	Danilo
CB	14	Éder Militão
CB	4	Marquinhos
LB	16	Renan Lodi	(yellow card) 38'	(substituted off) 46'
CM	17	Lucas Paquetá		(substituted off) 46'
CM	5	Casemiro (c)
CM	8	Fred		(substituted off) 86'
RF	9	Gabriel Jesus		(substituted off) 86'
CF	7	Richarlison		(substituted off) 65'
LF	10	Neymar
Substitutions:
DF	6	Alex Sandro		(substituted on) 46'
MF	11	Éverton Ribeiro		(substituted on) 46'
FW	21	Gabriel Barbosa	(yellow card) 66'	(substituted on) 65'
MF	15	Fabinho		(substituted on) 86'
FW	18	Vinícius Júnior		(substituted on) 86'
Manager:
Tite

GK	12	Joel Graterol
CB	28	Adrián Martínez
CB	8	Francisco La Mantía
CB	14	Luis Mago	(yellow card) 80'
RWB	21	Alexander González		(substituted off) 90+2'
LWB	27	Yohán Cumana
RM	13	José Andrés Martínez
CM	5	Júnior Moreno
CM	24	Bernaldo Manzano	(yellow card) 69'	(substituted off) 77'
LM	23	Cristian Cásseres Jr.		(substituted off) 84'
CF	9	Fernando Aristeguieta (c)		(substituted off) 77'
Substitutions:
MF	25	Richard Celis		(substituted on) 77'
FW	11	Sergio Córdova		(substituted on) 77'
MF	26	Edson Castillo		(substituted on) 84'
DF	20	Ronald Hernández		(substituted on) 90+2'
Manager:
(Portugal) José Peseiro

Assistant referees:
Carlos Barreiro (Uruguay)
Martín Soppi (Uruguay)
Fourth official:
Gery Vargas (Bolivia)
Video assistant referee:
Julio Bascuñán (Chile)
Assistant video assistant referee:
Cristian Garay (Chile)

==== Colombia vs Ecuador ====
13 June 2021
20:00 AMT (UTC−4)

Colombia	1–0	Ecuador
Cardona 42'	Report

Arena Pantanal, Cuiabá
Attendance: 0
Referee: Néstor Pitana (Argentina)

Colombia	Ecuador

GK	1	David Ospina (c)
RB	16	Daniel Muñoz	(yellow card) 79'
CB	13	Yerry Mina
CB	3	Óscar Murillo		(substituted off) 82'
LB	17	Yairo Moreno		(substituted off) 45+5'
RM	11	Juan Cuadrado
CM	5	Wilmar Barrios
CM	15	Mateus Uribe	(yellow card) 25'	(substituted off) 61'
LM	10	Edwin Cardona		(substituted off) 82'
CF	18	Rafael Santos Borré	(yellow card) 90'
CF	19	Miguel Borja		(substituted off) 61'
Substitutions:
DF	6	William Tesillo		(substituted on) 45+5'
MF	21	Sebastián Pérez		(substituted on) 61'
FW	7	Duván Zapata		(substituted on) 61'
DF	23	Davinson Sánchez		(substituted on) 82'
MF	8	Gustavo Cuéllar		(substituted on) 82'
Manager:
Reinaldo Rueda

GK	12	Pedro Ortíz
RB	17	Ángelo Preciado
CB	4	Robert Arboleda
CB	3	Piero Hincapié
LB	7	Pervis Estupiñán
RM	19	Gonzalo Plata		(substituted off) 69'
CM	20	Jhegson Méndez
CM	23	Moisés Caicedo		(substituted off) 80'
LM	8	Fidel Martínez		(substituted off) 59'
CF	11	Michael Estrada		(substituted off) 69'
CF	13	Enner Valencia (c)	(yellow card) 87'
Substitutions:
FW	15	Ángel Mena		(substituted on) 59'
MF	18	Ayrton Preciado		(substituted on) 69'
FW	26	Jordy Caicedo		(substituted on) 69'
MF	10	Damián Díaz		(substituted on) 80'
Manager:
(Argentina) Gustavo Alfaro

Assistant referees:
Ezequiel Brailovsky (Argentina)
Gabriel Chade (Argentina)
Fourth official:
Jesús Gil Manzano (Spain)
Video assistant referee:
Mauro Vigliano (Argentina)
Assistant video assistant referee:
Facundo Tello (Argentina)

=== Matchday 2 ===
==== Colombia vs Venezuela ====
17 June 2021
18:00 BRT (UTC−3)

Colombia	0–0	Venezuela
	Report

Estádio Olímpico Pedro Ludovico, Goiânia
Attendance: 0
Referee: Eber Aquino (Paraguay)

Colombia	Venezuela

GK	1	David Ospina (c)
RB	16	Daniel Muñoz
CB	13	Yerry Mina
CB	23	Davinson Sánchez
LB	6	William Tesillo
RM	11	Juan Cuadrado	(yellow card) 77'
CM	5	Wilmar Barrios
CM	15	Mateus Uribe	(yellow card) 82'
LM	10	Edwin Cardona		(substituted off) 62'
CF	9	Luis Muriel		(substituted off) 62'
CF	7	Duván Zapata		(substituted off) 73'
Substitutions:
MF	27	Jaminton Campaz		(substituted on) 62'
FW	14	Luis Díaz	(red card) 90+4'	(substituted on) 62'
FW	19	Miguel Borja		(substituted on) 73'
Manager:
Reinaldo Rueda

GK	1	Wuilker Faríñez
CB	28	Adrián Martínez
CB	8	Francisco La Mantía	(yellow card) 55'
CB	14	Luis Mago
RWB	21	Alexander González		(substituted off) 89'
LWB	27	Yohán Cumana	(yellow card) 86'
RM	13	José Andrés Martínez	(yellow card) 81'
CM	5	Júnior Moreno
CM	24	Bernaldo Manzano		(substituted off) 59'
LM	23	Cristian Cásseres Jr.		(substituted off) 89'
CF	9	Fernando Aristeguieta (c)	(yellow card) 51'	(substituted off) 83'
Substitutions:
MF	6	Yangel Herrera	(yellow card) 77'	(substituted on) 59'
FW	11	Sergio Córdova		(substituted on) 83'
DF	20	Ronald Hernández		(substituted on) 89'
MF	26	Edson Castillo		(substituted on) 89'
Manager:
(Portugal) José Peseiro

Man of the Match:
Wuilker Faríñez (Venezuela)

Assistant referees:
Eduardo Cardozo (Paraguay)
Milciades Saldívar (Paraguay)
Fourth official:
Daniel Fedorczuk (Uruguay)
Video assistant referee:
Derlis López (Paraguay)
Assistant video assistant referee:
Juan Gabriel Benítez (Paraguay)

==== Brazil vs Peru ====
17 June 2021
21:00 BRT (UTC−3)

Brazil	4–0	Peru
Alex Sandro 12'; Neymar 68'; Ribeiro 89'; Richarlison 90+3'	Report

Estádio Olímpico Nilton Santos, Rio de Janeiro
Attendance: 0
Referee: Patricio Loustau (Argentina)

Brazil	Peru

GK	23	Ederson
RB	2	Danilo		(substituted off) 84'
CB	14	Éder Militão
CB	3	Thiago Silva (c)
LB	6	Alex Sandro		(substituted off) 77'
RM	9	Gabriel Jesus	(yellow card) 59'	(substituted off) 72'
CM	15	Fabinho
CM	8	Fred
LM	19	Everton		(substituted off) 46'
CF	21	Gabriel Barbosa		(substituted off) 46'
CF	10	Neymar
Substitutions:
MF	11	Éverton Ribeiro		(substituted on) 46'
FW	7	Richarlison		(substituted on) 46'
MF	20	Roberto Firmino		(substituted on) 72'
DF	16	Renan Lodi		(substituted on) 77'
DF	13	Emerson Royal		(substituted on) 84'
Manager:
Tite

GK	1	Pedro Gallese (c)
RB	3	Aldo Corzo
CB	15	Christian Ramos	(yellow card) 23'
CB	2	Luis Abram
LB	16	Marcos López
CM	13	Renato Tapia
CM	19	Yoshimar Yotún	(yellow card) 44'	(substituted off) 74'
RW	18	André Carrillo
AM	8	Sergio Peña		(substituted off) 67'
LW	10	Christian Cueva		(substituted off) 74'
CF	9	Gianluca Lapadula		(substituted off) 67'
Substitutions:
MF	17	Luis Iberico		(substituted on) 67'
FW	11	Alex Valera		(substituted on) 67'
MF	7	Martín Távara	(yellow card) 82'	(substituted on) 74'
MF	23	Alexis Arias		(substituted on) 74'
Manager:
(Argentina) Ricardo Gareca

Man of the Match:
Neymar (Brazil)

Assistant referees:
Gabriel Chade (Argentina)
Ezequiel Brailovsky (Argentina)
Fourth official:
Facundo Tello (Argentina)
Video assistant referee:
Mauro Vigliano (Argentina)
Assistant video assistant referee:
Cristián Garay (Chile)

=== Matchday 3 ===
==== Venezuela vs Ecuador ====
20 June 2021
18:00 BRT (UTC−3)

Venezuela	2–2	Ecuador
Castillo 51'; Hernández 90+1'	Report	Ay. Preciado 39'; Plata 71'

Estádio Olímpico Nilton Santos, Rio de Janeiro
Attendance: 0
Referee: Roberto Tobar (Chile)

Venezuela	Ecuador

GK	1	Wuilker Faríñez
CB	4	José Manuel Velázquez
CB	28	Adrián Martínez
CB	14	Luis Mago
RWB	21	Alexander González
LWB	27	Yohán Cumana	(substituted off) 77'
RM	13	José Andrés Martínez	(substituted off) 77'
CM	5	Júnior Moreno	(substituted off) 82'
CM	26	Edson Castillo
LM	23	Cristian Cásseres Jr.	(substituted off) 82'
CF	9	Fernando Aristeguieta (c)	(substituted off) 57'
Substitutions:
FW	11	Sergio Córdova	(substituted on) 57'
DF	20	Ronald Hernández	(substituted on) 77'
FW	15	Jan Carlos Hurtado	(substituted on) 77'
MF	24	Bernaldo Manzano	(substituted on) 82'
MF	25	Richard Celis	(substituted on) 82'
Manager:
(Portugal) José Peseiro

GK	12	Pedro Ortíz
RB	17	Ángelo Preciado	(yellow card) 45+3'
CB	4	Robert Arboleda
CB	3	Piero Hincapié
LB	7	Pervis Estupiñán
RM	15	Ángel Mena		(substituted off) 68'
CM	20	Jhegson Méndez		(substituted off) 67'
CM	23	Moisés Caicedo	(yellow card) 81'
LM	18	Ayrton Preciado		(substituted off) 88'
CF	9	Leonardo Campana
CF	13	Enner Valencia (c)	(yellow card) 21'	(substituted off) 83'
Substitutions:
MF	6	Christian Noboa		(substituted on) 67'
MF	19	Gonzalo Plata		(substituted on) 68'
MF	21	Alan Franco		(substituted on) 83'
MF	8	Fidel Martínez		(substituted on) 88'
Manager:
(Argentina) Gustavo Alfaro

Man of the Match:
Gonzalo Plata (Ecuador)

Assistant referees:
Christian Schiemann (Chile)
Claudio Ríos (Chile)
Fourth official:
Leodán Gonzalez (Uruguay)
Video assistant referee:
Julio Bascuñán (Chile)
Assistant video assistant referee:
Cristián Garay (Chile)

==== Colombia vs Peru ====
20 June 2021
21:00 BRT (UTC−3)

Colombia	1–2	Peru
Borja 53' (pen.)	Report	Peña 17'; Mina 64' (o.g.)

Estádio Olímpico Pedro Ludovico, Goiânia
Attendance: 0
Referee: Esteban Ostojich (Uruguay)

Colombia	Peru

GK	1	David Ospina (c)
RB	2	Stefan Medina		(substituted off) 81'
CB	13	Yerry Mina
CB	23	Davinson Sánchez
LB	6	William Tesillo
CM	5	Wilmar Barrios
CM	21	Sebastián Pérez		(substituted off) 60'
RW	11	Juan Cuadrado
AM	10	Edwin Cardona		(substituted off) 70'
LW	7	Duván Zapata		(substituted off) 61'
CF	19	Miguel Borja	(yellow card) 29'
Substitutions:
MF	8	Gustavo Cuéllar		(substituted on) 60'
FW	9	Luis Muriel		(substituted on) 61'
FW	28	Yimmi Chará		(substituted on) 70'
FW	20	Alfredo Morelos		(substituted on) 81'
Manager:
Reinaldo Rueda

GK	1	Pedro Gallese	(yellow card) 51'
RB	3	Aldo Corzo
CB	15	Christian Ramos
CB	22	Alexander Callens
LB	16	Marcos López
CM	13	Renato Tapia
CM	19	Yoshimar Yotún (c)
RW	18	André Carrillo	(yellow card) 43'
AM	8	Sergio Peña		(substituted off) 83'
LW	10	Christian Cueva		(substituted off) 90+2'
CF	9	Gianluca Lapadula		(substituted off) 83'
Substitutions:
MF	14	Wilder Cartagena		(substituted on) 83'
FW	20	Santiago Ormeño		(substituted on) 83'
MF	24	Raziel García		(substituted on) 90+2'
Manager:
(Argentina) Ricardo Gareca

Man of the Match:
Renato Tapia (Peru)

Assistant referees:
Martín Soppi (Uruguay)
Edwar Saavedra (Bolivia)
Fourth official:
Gery Vargas (Bolivia)
Video assistant referee:
Andrés Cunha (Uruguay)
Assistant video assistant referee:
Daniel Fedorczuk (Uruguay)

=== Matchday 4 ===
==== Ecuador vs Peru ====
23 June 2021
18:00 BRT (UTC−3)

Ecuador	2–2	Peru
Tapia 23' (o.g.); Ay. Preciado 45+3'	Report	Lapadula 49'; Carrillo 54'

Estádio Olímpico Pedro Ludovico, Goiânia
Attendance: 0
Referee: Jesús Gil Manzano (Spain)

Ecuador	Peru

GK	1	Hernán Galíndez
RB	17	Ángelo Preciado
CB	4	Robert Arboleda (c)
CB	3	Piero Hincapié	(yellow card) 57'
LB	7	Pervis Estupiñán
RM	21	Alan Franco		(substituted off) 82'
CM	20	Jhegson Méndez		(substituted off) 81'
CM	23	Moisés Caicedo
LM	18	Ayrton Preciado		(substituted off) 90+2'
SS	10	Damián Díaz		(substituted off) 64'
CF	9	Leonardo Campana		(substituted off) 64'
Substitutions:
FW	11	Michael Estrada		(substituted on) 64'
FW	15	Ángel Mena		(substituted on) 64'
MF	6	Christian Noboa		(substituted on) 81'
FW	26	Jordy Caicedo		(substituted on) 82'
MF	8	Fidel Martínez		(substituted on) 90+2'
Manager:
(Argentina) Gustavo Alfaro

GK	1	Pedro Gallese (c)
RB	3	Aldo Corzo
CB	15	Christian Ramos	(yellow card) 88'
CB	22	Alexander Callens
LB	6	Miguel Trauco
CM	13	Renato Tapia
CM	19	Yoshimar Yotún		(substituted off) 90+3'
RW	18	André Carrillo
AM	8	Sergio Peña		(substituted off) 78'
LW	10	Christian Cueva		(substituted off) 86'
CF	9	Gianluca Lapadula		(substituted off) 78'
Substitutions:
MF	14	Wilder Cartagena		(substituted on) 78'
FW	20	Santiago Ormeño		(substituted on) 78'
DF	5	Miguel Araujo		(substituted on) 86'
FW	17	Luis Iberico		(substituted on) 90+3'
Manager:
(Argentina) Ricardo Gareca

Man of the Match:
Gianluca Lapadula (Peru)

Assistant referees:
Diego Barbero (Spain)
Ángel Nevado (Spain)
Fourth official:
Patricio Loustau (Argentina)
Video assistant referee:
Ricardo de Burgos Bengoetxea (Spain)
Assistant video assistant referee:
José Luis Munuera Montero (Spain)

==== Brazil vs Colombia ====
23 June 2021
21:00 BRT (UTC−3)

Brazil	2–1	Colombia
Firmino 78'; Casemiro 90+10'	Report	Díaz 10'

Estádio Olímpico Nilton Santos, Rio de Janeiro
Attendance: 0
Referee: Néstor Pitana (Argentina)

Brazil	Colombia

GK	12	Weverton
RB	2	Danilo
CB	4	Marquinhos (c)
CB	3	Thiago Silva
LB	6	Alex Sandro	(yellow card) 14'	(substituted off) 62'
RM	11	Éverton Ribeiro	(yellow card) 27'	(substituted off) 46'
CM	5	Casemiro
CM	8	Fred		(substituted off) 68'
LM	7	Richarlison		(substituted off) 77'
CF	9	Gabriel Jesus		(substituted off) 77'
CF	10	Neymar	(yellow card) 87'
Substitutions:
FW	20	Roberto Firmino		(substituted on) 46'
DF	16	Renan Lodi		(substituted on) 62'
MF	17	Lucas Paquetá		(substituted on) 68'
FW	19	Everton		(substituted on) 77'
FW	21	Gabriel Barbosa		(substituted on) 77'
Manager:
Tite

GK	1	David Ospina (c)	(yellow card) 81'
RB	16	Daniel Muñoz
CB	13	Yerry Mina
CB	23	Davinson Sánchez
LB	6	William Tesillo
RM	11	Juan Cuadrado	(yellow card) 70'
CM	5	Wilmar Barrios	(yellow card) 90+9'
CM	15	Mateus Uribe
LM	14	Luis Díaz		(substituted off) 90+1'
CF	18	Rafael Santos Borré		(substituted off) 64'
CF	7	Duván Zapata		(substituted off) 64'
Substitutions:
MF	8	Gustavo Cuéllar	(yellow card) 90+12'	(substituted on) 64'
FW	19	Miguel Borja		(substituted on) 64'
DF	3	Óscar Murillo		(substituted on) 90+1'
Manager:
Reinaldo Rueda

Man of the Match:
Luis Díaz (Colombia)

Assistant referees:
Ezequiel Brailovsky (Argentina)
José Antelo (Bolivia)
Fourth official:
Leodán González (Uruguay)
Video assistant referee:
Mauro Vigliano (Argentina)
Assistant video assistant referee:
Facundo Tello (Argentina)

=== Matchday 5 ===
==== Brazil vs Ecuador ====
27 June 2021
18:00 BRT (UTC−3)

Brazil	1–1	Ecuador
Militão 37'	Report	Mena 53'

Estádio Olímpico Pedro Ludovico, Goiânia
Attendance: 0
Referee: Roberto Tobar (Chile)

Brazil	Ecuador

GK	1	Alisson Becker
RB	13	Emerson Royal
CB	14	Éder Militão
CB	4	Marquinhos (c)
LB	16	Renan Lodi	(substituted off) 49'
CM	15	Fabinho
CM	25	Douglas Luiz	(substituted off) 63'
RW	17	Lucas Paquetá	(substituted off) 78'
AM	20	Roberto Firmino	(substituted off) 63'
LW	19	Everton	(substituted off) 78'
CF	21	Gabriel Barbosa
Substitutions:
DF	2	Danilo	(substituted on) 49'
MF	5	Casemiro	(substituted on) 63'
FW	18	Vinícius Júnior	(substituted on) 63'
MF	11	Éverton Ribeiro	(substituted on) 78'
FW	7	Richarlison	(substituted on) 78'
Manager:
Tite

GK	1	Hernán Galíndez
RB	17	Ángelo Preciado
CB	4	Robert Arboleda
CB	3	Piero Hincapié
LB	7	Pervis Estupiñán	(yellow card) 83'
RM	21	Alan Franco
CM	20	Jhegson Méndez
CM	23	Moisés Caicedo		(substituted off) 17'
LM	27	Diego Palacios		(substituted off) 72'
CF	13	Enner Valencia (c)		(substituted off) 83'
CF	18	Ayrton Preciado		(substituted off) 84'
Substitutions:
FW	15	Ángel Mena		(substituted on) 17'
MF	19	Gonzalo Plata		(substituted on) 72'
FW	9	Leonardo Campana		(substituted on) 83'
DF	16	Mario Pineida		(substituted on) 84'
Manager:
(Argentina) Gustavo Alfaro

Man of the Match:
Enner Valencia (Ecuador)

Assistant referees:
Christian Schiemann (Chile)
Claudio Ríos (Chile)
Fourth official:
Andrés Cunha (Uruguay)
Video assistant referee:
Julio Bascuñán (Chile)
Assistant video assistant referee:
Cristian Garay (Chile)

==== Venezuela vs Peru ====
27 June 2021
18:00 BRT (UTC−3)

Venezuela	0–1	Peru
	Report	Carrillo 48'

Estádio Nacional Mané Garrincha, Brasília
Attendance: 0
Referee: Patricio Loustau (Argentina)

Venezuela	Peru

GK	1	Wuilker Faríñez
CB	2	Nahuel Ferraresi
CB	3	Mikel Villanueva
CB	14	Luis Mago
RWB	16	Roberto Rosales (c)		(substituted off) 69'
LWB	20	Ronald Hernández	(yellow card) 21'
RM	7	Jefferson Savarino		(substituted off) 59'
CM	5	Júnior Moreno
CM	26	Edson Castillo		(substituted off) 69'
LM	23	Cristian Cásseres Jr.		(substituted off) 59'
CF	11	Sergio Córdova		(substituted off) 78'
Substitutions:
MF	13	José Andrés Martínez		(substituted on) 59'
MF	18	Rómulo Otero		(substituted on) 59'
DF	21	Alexander González		(substituted on) 69'
MF	10	Yeferson Soteldo		(substituted on) 69'
FW	15	Jan Carlos Hurtado		(substituted on) 78'
Manager:
(Portugal) José Peseiro

GK	1	Pedro Gallese (c)
RB	3	Aldo Corzo
CB	5	Miguel Araujo
CB	22	Alexander Callens	(substituted off) 27'
LB	6	Miguel Trauco
CM	13	Renato Tapia	(substituted off) 73'
CM	19	Yoshimar Yotún
RW	18	André Carrillo	(substituted off) 73'
AM	8	Sergio Peña
LW	10	Christian Cueva	(substituted off) 83'
CF	9	Gianluca Lapadula	(substituted off) 83'
Substitutions:
DF	2	Luis Abram	(substituted on) 27'
MF	14	Wilder Cartagena	(substituted on) 73'
MF	24	Raziel García	(substituted on) 73'
FW	11	Alex Valera	(substituted on) 83'
FW	20	Santiago Ormeño	(substituted on) 83'
Manager:
(Argentina) Ricardo Gareca

Man of the Match:
André Carrillo (Peru)

Assistant referees:
Gabriel Chade (Argentina)
Eduardo Cardozo (Paraguay)
Fourth official:
Eber Aquino (Paraguay)
Video assistant referee:
Derlis López (Paraguay)
Assistant video assistant referee:
Juan Gabriel Benítez (Paraguay)

== Discipline ==
Fair play points were to be used as a tiebreaker if the overall and head-to-head records of teams were tied. These were calculated based on yellow and red cards received in all group matches as follows:

- first yellow card: minus 1 point;
- indirect red card (second yellow card): minus 3 points;
- direct red card: minus 4 points;
- yellow card and direct red card: minus 5 points;

Only one of the above deductions was applied to a player in a single match.

Team	Matchday 1				Matchday 2				Matchday 3				Matchday 4				Matchday 5				Points
Team	Booked	(yellow card) (yellow-red card)	Sent off (straight red)	(yellow card) (red card)	Booked	(yellow card) (yellow-red card)	Sent off (straight red)	(yellow card) (red card)	Booked	(yellow card) (yellow-red card)	Sent off (straight red)	(yellow card) (red card)	Booked	(yellow card) (yellow-red card)	Sent off (straight red)	(yellow card) (red card)	Booked	(yellow card) (yellow-red card)	Sent off (straight red)	(yellow card) (red card)	Points
Brazil	2	0	0	0	1	0	0	0					3	0	0	0	0	0	0	0	–6
Colombia	3	0	0	0	2	0	1	0	1	0	0	0	4	0	0	0					–14
Venezuela	2	0	0	0	5	0	0	0	0	0	0	0					1	0	0	0	–8
Ecuador	1	0	0	0					3	0	0	0	1	0	0	0	1	0	0	0	–6
Peru					3	0	0	0	2	0	0	0	1	0	0	0	0	0	0	0	–6
