= Luis Romero (Venezuelan footballer) =

Venezuelan footballer

Personal information
- Full name: Luis Enrique Romero Durán
- Date of birth: 16 November 1990 (age 35)
- Place of birth: Turén, Portuguesa, Venezuela
- Height: 1.87 m (6 ft 2 in)
- Position: Goalkeeper

Team information
- Current team: Puerto Cabello
- Number: 55

Youth career
- Atlético Turén
- 2009–2010: Zulia

Senior career*
Years	Team	Apps	(Gls)
2008–2009	Atlético Turén	–	(–)
2011–2014	Zulia	61	(0)
2011	→ Real Bolívar (loan)		
2014–2019	Mineros de Guayana	86	(0)
2016	→ Deportivo La Guaira (loan)	8	(0)
2018	→ Monagas (loan)	19	(0)
2020	Zamora	8	(0)
2021	Portuguesa	23	(0)
2022	Deportes Recoleta	15	(1)
2023–	Puerto Cabello	63	(0)

International career
2021–2022	Venezuela		
- * Club domestic league appearances and goals as of 1 August 2025

Luis Enrique Romero Durán (born 16 November 1990) is a Venezuelan professional footballer who plays as a goalkeeper for Academia Puerto Cabello.

== Club career ==
Born in Turén, Romero started his career with the local team Atlético Turén. He signed with Zulia and was loaned out to Real Bolívar in the 2010–11 Venezuelan Segunda División. Back to Zulia, he made his debut in the Venezuelan top division at the end of 2011.

In June 2014, Romero signed with Mineros de Guayana and won the 2017 Copa Venezuela. He was loaned out to Deportivo La Guaira and Monagas in 2016 and 2018, respectively.

After Mineros de Guayana, Romero joined Zamora in 2020. The next year, he switched to Portuguesa and reached the least goals conceded of the season.

In 2022, Romero moved abroad and signed with Chilean club Deportes Recoleta. He scored the goal in the 1–2 loss against Rangers de Talca on 3 April.

Back in Venezuela, Romero joined Academia Puerto Cabello in December 2022.

== International career ==
Romero was a member of the Venezuela squad in the 2021 Copa América. He also was called up to 2022 FIFA World Cup qualification matches.
