= Óscar Ribera =

Bolivian footballer (born 1992)

Personal information
- Full name: Óscar Leandro Ribera
- Date of birth: 10 February 1992 (age 34)
- Place of birth: La Paz, Bolivia
- Height: 1.75 m (5 ft 9 in)
- Positions: Full back; right midfielder

Team information
- Current team: Naples United
- Number: 2

Youth career
- –2016: Universitario de Sucre

Senior career*
| Years | Team | Apps | (Gls) |
| 2016–2017 | Oriente Petrolero | 25 | (1) |
| 2017–2019 | Bolívar | 12 | (0) |
| 2018 | → Sport Boys (loan) | 34 | (1) |
| 2019 | Oriente Petrolero | 13 | (1) |
| 2019–2021 | Bolívar | 25 | (0) |
| 2021 | Blooming | 12 | (1) |
| 2022 | The Strongest | 4 | (0) |
| 2022 | Club Independiente Petrolero | 15 | (0) |
| 2023 | Blooming | 3 | (0) |
| 2023-2024 | Real Tomayapo | 2 | (0) |
| 2024 | Real Santa Cruz | 8 | (0) |
| 2025– | Naples United | | |

International career^{‡}
| 2017– | Bolivia | 13 | (0) |
- * Club domestic league appearances and goals as of 20 March 2025 ‡ National team caps and goals as of 13:02, 06 January 2023 (UTC)

Óscar Leandro Ribera (born 10 February 1992) is a Bolivian professional footballer who plays for National Premier Soccer League side Naples United FC and the Bolivia national team.

== Club career ==
A right back, Ribera was at Oriente Petrolero before joining Club Bolívar in 2017. He continued with the club in 2020, prior to playing for Club Blooming in 2021. He signed for The Strongest for the 2022 season. He joined Real Tomayapo in 2023. In 2024, he began to train with Real Santa Cruz.

In 2025, Ribera joined National Premier Soccer League club Naples United FC, where he started in the team's 2025 U.S. Open Cup match against Miami FC.

== International career ==
On 23 March 2017 Ribera played in a 2018 FIFA World Cup qualification game for Bolivia away against Colombia. He played for his country at the 2021 Copa America.
