= Yohán Cumana =

Venezuelan footballer (born 1996)

Personal information
- Full name: Yohán Eduardo Cumana Hernández
- Date of birth: 8 March 1996 (age 30)
- Place of birth: Venezuela
- Height: 1.76 m (5 ft 9 in)
- Position: Left-back

Team information
- Current team: UCV
- Number: 24

Youth career
- Deportivo Anzoátegui

Senior career*
Years	Team	Apps	(Gls)
2014–2017	Deportivo Anzoátegui	64	(4)
2017–2023	Deportivo La Guaira	141	(10)
2023	Once Caldas	3	(0)
2024-	UCV	48	(2)

International career^{‡}
2021–	Venezuela	9	(0)
- * Club domestic league appearances and goals as of 10 March 2026 ‡ National team caps and goals as of 20:36, 27 January 2022 (UTC)

Yohán Eduardo Cumana Hernández, known as Yohán Cumana (born 8 March 1996), is a Venezuelan footballer who plays for Universidad Central de Venezuela F.C. and the Venezuela national team.

== Club career ==
He played domestic football in Colombia for Once Caldas prior to joining Venezuelan side Universidad Central de Venezuela F.C. in late 2023.

== International career ==
Cumana made his debut for the full Venezuela national football team in the opening fixture of the 2021 Copa América against Brazil.
