= Raziel García =

Peruvian footballer (born 1994)

Personal information
- Full name: Raziel Samir Fernando García Paredes
- Date of birth: 15 February 1994 (age 32)
- Place of birth: Lima, Peru
- Height: 1.75 m (5 ft 9 in)
- Position: Midfielder

Team information
- Current team: Cienciano

Senior career*
Years	Team	Apps	(Gls)
2012–2016	Universidad San Martín	48	(3)
2017	Unión Huaral	25	(5)
2018–2020	Universidad César Vallejo	77	(7)
2021–2022	Cienciano	20	(3)
2022-	Deportes Tolima	10	(0)

International career^{‡}
2011–2012	Peru U17	3	(1)
2013	Peru U20	6	(0)
2021–	Peru	10	(0)
- * Club domestic league appearances and goals ‡ National team caps and goals as of 16:20, 23 March 2024 (UTC)

Raziel Samir Fernando García Paredes (born 15 February 1994), better known as Raziel García, is a Peruvian professional footballer who plays as a midfielder for Cienciano and the Peru national team.

== International career ==
García was called up to the Peru national football team for the 2021 Copa América and made his senior international debut on June 20, 2021, coming off the bench in a 2–1 victory over Colombia.
