= Hernán Galíndez =

Ecuadorian footballer (born 1987)

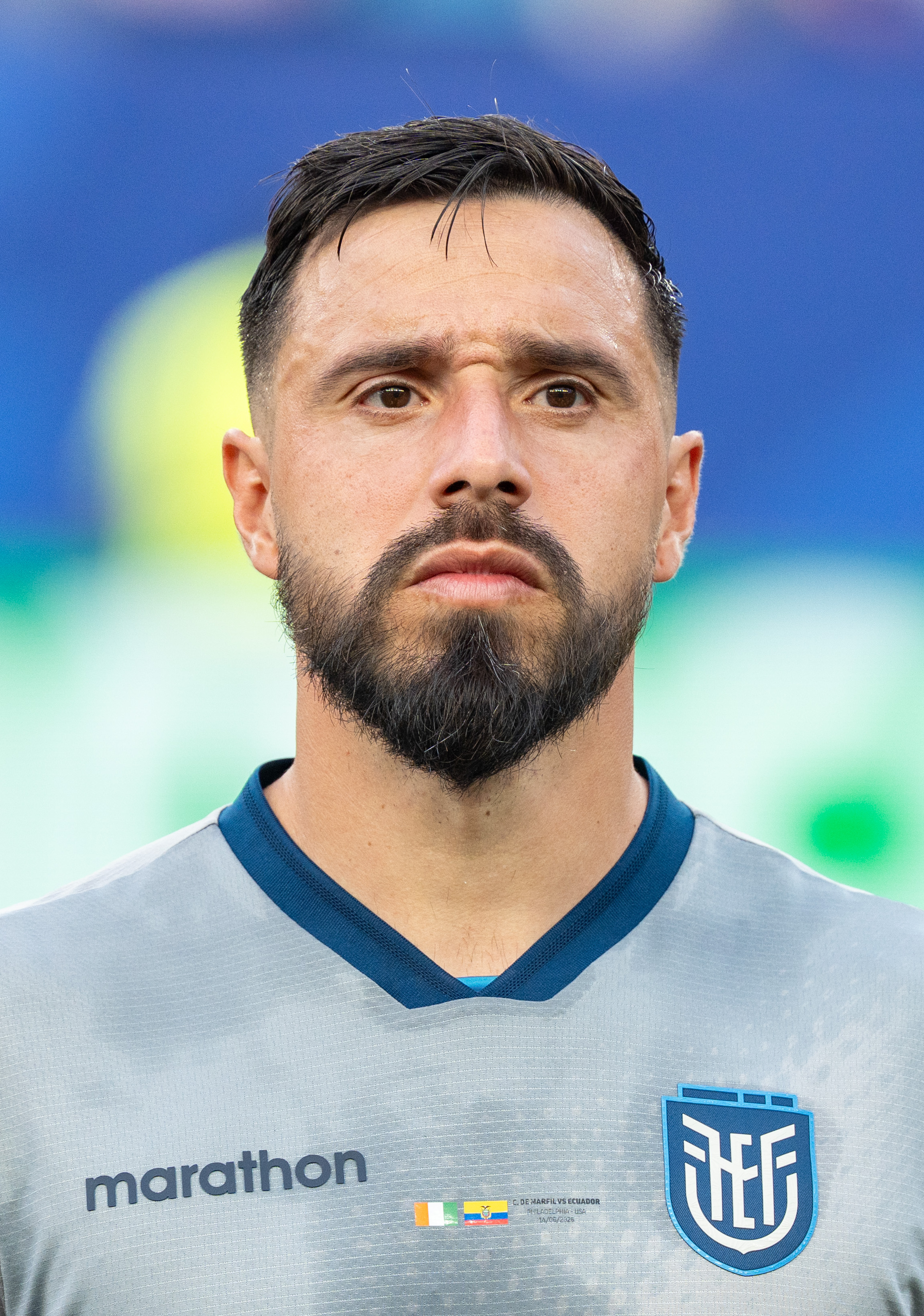
- Galíndez with Ecuador in 2026

Personal information
- Full name: Hernán Ismael Galíndez
- Date of birth: 30 March 1987 (age 39)
- Place of birth: Rosario, Santa Fe, Argentina
- Height: 1.89 m (6 ft 2 in)
- Position: Goalkeeper

Team information
- Current team: Huracán
- Number: 1

Youth career
- Alianza Sports (seven-a-side)
- Estrella Juniors
- Rosario Central

Senior career*
Years	Team	Apps	(Gls)
2008–2011	Rosario Central	25	(0)
2010–2011	→ Quilmes (loan)	15	(0)
2012	Rangers	0	(0)
2012	→ Universidad Católica (loan)	41	(0)
2013–2021	Universidad Católica	319	(1)
2022	Universidad de Chile	14	(0)
2022–2023	Aucas	36	(0)
2024–	Huracán	96	(0)

International career^{‡}
2021–2026	Ecuador	41	(0)
- * Club domestic league appearances and goals as of 21:34, 19 September 2026 (UTC) ‡ National team caps and goals as of 20:23, 1 October 2026 (UTC)

Hernán Ismael Galíndez (born 30 March 1987) is a professional footballer who plays as a goalkeeper for Argentine Primera División club Huracán. Born in Argentina, he represented the Ecuador national team.

Galíndez began his career in Argentina with Rosario Central before settling in Ecuador with Universidad Católica, where he made over 300 appearances in a nine-year spell. In 2022, he joined Universidad de Chile but left the club after six months, citing harassment from the club's fanbase. He returned to Ecuador with Aucas, helping the side win the first title in the club's history in his debut season. After a one-and-a-half-year stint in Aucas, he returned to his birth country as he signed with Argentine club, Huracán.

Galíndez represented Ecuador at two editions of the Copa América (2021 and 2024), as well as two FIFA World Cups (2022 and 2026), playing three times in each tournament.

== Club career ==
=== Early career ===
As a child, Galíndez played for local youth clubs Estrella Juniors and Alianza Sports as a midfielder. During a local youth tournament at the age of seven, he switched to play as a goalkeeper and faced a neighbouring team featuring Lionel Messi. Galíndez later recounted that Messi scored the first goal he had ever conceded, although his team went on to win and he and his teammates were awarded a bicycle for winning. At the age of 10, he joined the Rosario Central youth team, remaining with the club until he was 21, spending a period on loan with Quilmes during the 2010–11 season. When the club was relegated in 2010, both Galíndez and his family received death threats and he contemplated giving up the game.

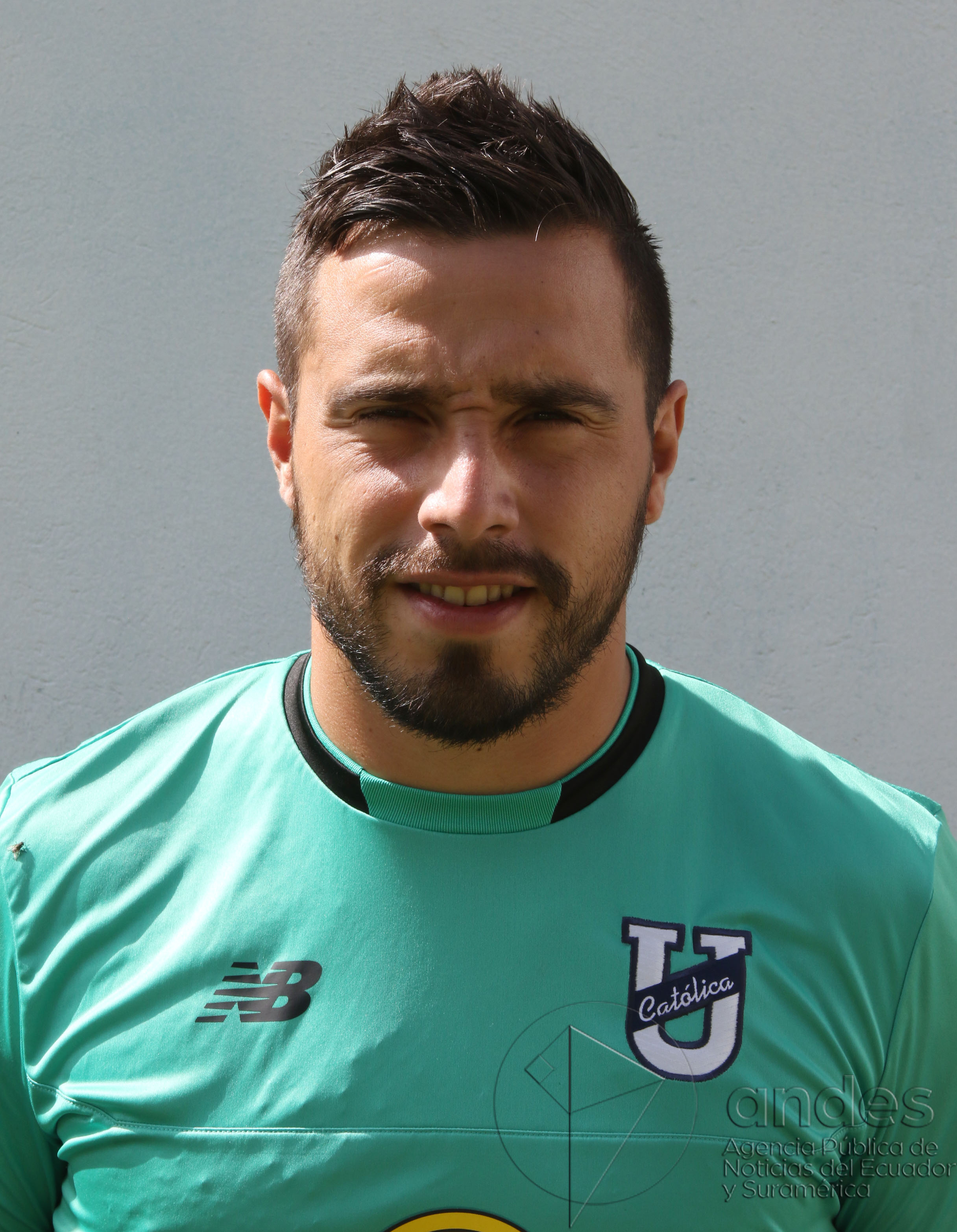
Galíndez with Universidad Católica in 2016

In 2012, Galíndez was released by Rosario and joined Rangers de Talca, but he only took part in the preseason until he was loaned to Universidad Católica del Ecuador in the Ecuadorian Serie B. Having never left Argentina before, Galíndez was offered a room by teammate Facundo Martínez on arrival. He helped the club win promotion to the Ecuadorian Serie A in his first season after playing 41 league matches.

On 6 March 2016, he saved two penalties in a game against L.D.U. Quito, securing a 1–1 draw for his side.

=== Universidad de Chile ===
Galíndez signed for Chilean side Universidad de Chile in January 2022 on a two-year deal with the club having the option of a third. He made his debut for the side in a 4–2 victory over Unión La Calera on 6 February 2022. He made 14 appearances for the side before personal issues led him to request a transfer. After FIFA rejected Chile's appeal against Ecuador's qualification for the 2022 FIFA World Cup over the fielding of an ineligible player, Galíndez claimed he was targeted by angry Chilean fans on social media as an Ecuadorian international. This was the second complaint of harassment by fans made by Galíndez following his transfer after his wife received abusive messages online.

=== Aucas ===
Universidad received approaches from L.D.U. Quito, but Galíndez instead chose to join rival Ecuadorian side Aucas with the agreed fee being reported around $250,000. He made his debut for the club in a 2–0 victory over Orense on 9 July and was not on the losing side for the remainder of the season over 13 matches. He helped the side win the Ecuadorian Serie A for the first time in the club's history, defeating Barcelona 1–0 on aggregate in the final. In the decisive second leg of the final, Galíndez saved a penalty from Barcelona captain Damián Díaz to help his side to victory and end the season with six consecutive clean sheets.

=== Huracán ===
Galíndez joined Huracán in January 2024. In February 2025, Galíndez signed a contract extension through 2027. Galíndez lead Huracán to the 2025 Torneo Apertura final, keeping a clean sheet and saving two penalties in the semifinal shootout against Independiente. On May 9, 2026, Galíndez recorded 10 saves against Boca Juniors for the round of 16 of the Torneo Apertura, earning the Man of the Match award and being key for Huracán's 2–3 away victory.

== International career ==
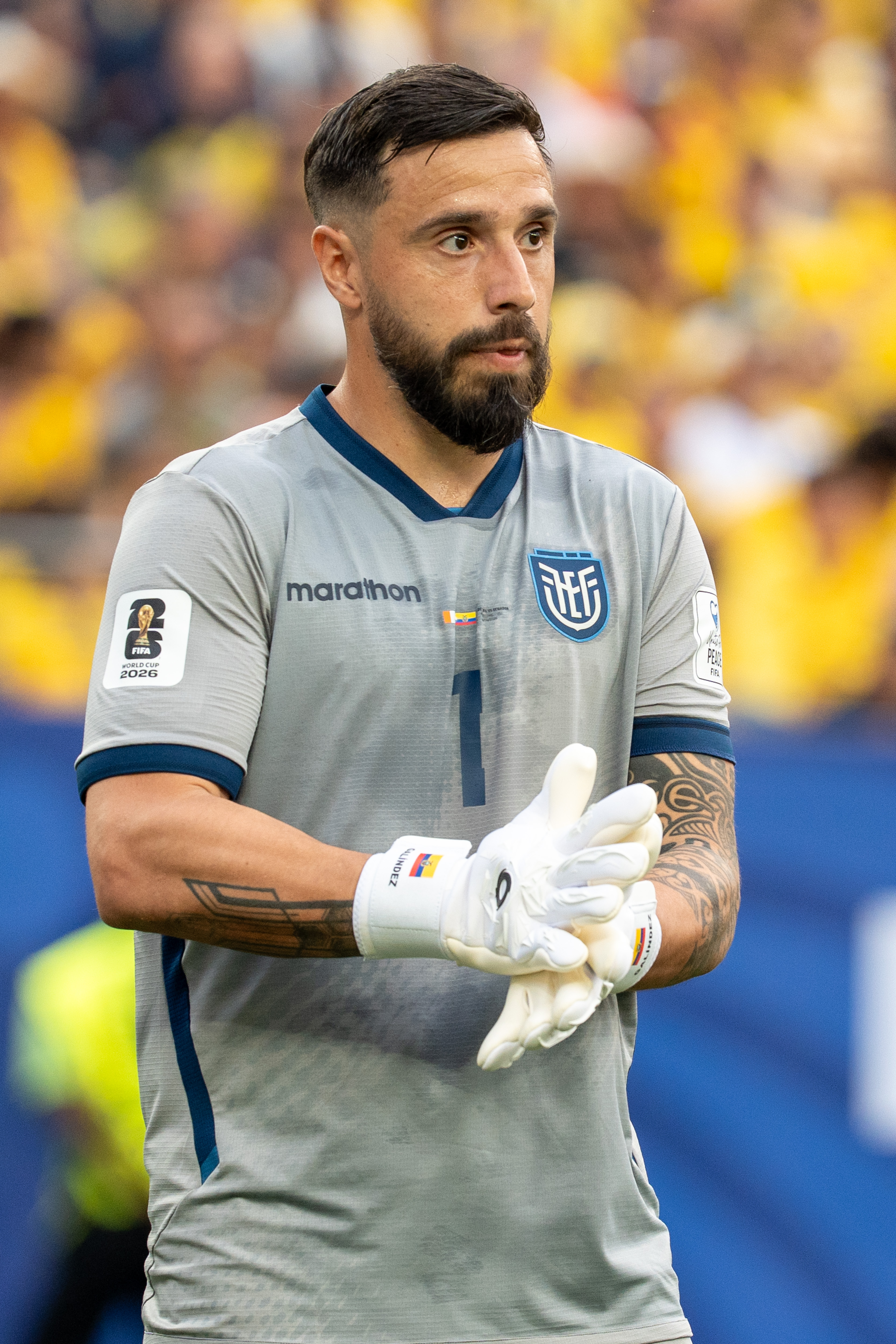
Galindez with Ecuador at the 2026 FIFA World Cup

Born in Argentina, Galíndez became a nationalised Ecuadorian in February 2019, a process which he had originally started in 2016. He was called up to the Ecuador national team for the first time by manager Gustavo Alfaro in October 2020 as a replacement for Johan Padilla who tested positive for COVID-19. He was selected for the Ecuador squad for the 2021 Copa América and made his international debut on 23 June 2021 in a 2–2 draw with Peru in Ecuador's third group match. He played the remainder of his side's matches as they reached the quarter-finals before being eliminated by Argentina.

After going seven games without conceding a goal, Galíndez was selected for the 2022 FIFA World Cup and was chosen as the starting goalkeeper in all three of his nation's matches, ahead of Alexander Domínguez, as they were eliminated in the group stage.

Galíndez was called up to the final 26-man Ecuador squad for the 2024 Copa América.

On 31 May 2026, Galíndez was selected in the 26-man squad for the 2026 FIFA World Cup.

== Style of play ==
Galíndez has been described as a "complete goalkeeper", possessing quick reflexes but also being able to play well with the ball at his feet.

== Personal life ==
Galíndez has a twin brother.

== Career statistics ==
=== International ===
As of 1 October 2026

Appearances and goals by national team and year
National team	Year	Apps	Goals
Ecuador	2021	7	0
Ecuador	2022	8	0
Ecuador	2023	3	0
Ecuador	2024	7	0
Ecuador	2025	8	0
Ecuador	2026	8	0
Total		41	0

== Honours ==
Universidad Católica

- Ecuadorian Serie B: 2012

Aucas

- Ecuadorian Serie A: 2022
