= Ayrton Preciado =

Ecuadorian footballer (born 1994)

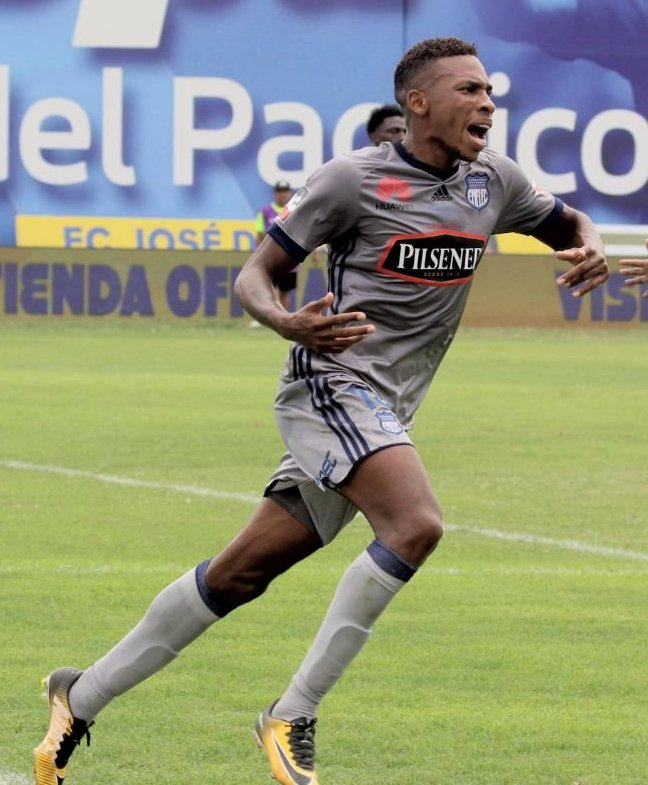
- Preciado with Emelec in 2017

Personal information
- Full name: Eduar Ayrton Preciado García
- Date of birth: 17 July 1994 (age 32)
- Place of birth: Esmeraldas, Ecuador
- Height: 1.81 m (5 ft 11 in)
- Position: Forward

Team information
- Current team: Aucas

Senior career*
| Years | Team | Apps | (Gls) |
| 2010–2013 | Deportivo Quito | 15 | (0) |
| 2013–2014 | Trofense | 37 | (6) |
| 2014–2015 | Leixões | 14 | (2) |
| 2015–2016 | Aucas | 57 | (12) |
| 2017–2018 | Emelec | 56 | (23) |
| 2018–2023 | Santos Laguna | 51 | (9) |
| 2023–2024 | Guayaquil City | 14 | (0) |
| 2024–2025 | Querétaro | 10 | (1) |
| 2025–2026 | Aldosivi | 25 | (3) |
| 2026– | Aucas | 0 | (0) |

International career^{‡}
| 2017–2022 | Ecuador | 27 | (3) |
- * Club domestic league appearances and goals as of 16:16, 8 March 2026 (UTC) ‡ National team caps and goals as of 07:47, 30 November 2022 (UTC)

Eduar Ayrton Preciado García (born 17 July 1994) is an Ecuadorian professional footballer who plays for LigaPro Serie A club Aucas as a forward. He was part of the Ecuador national team.

== Career ==
On 23 December 2016, Preciado was announced at Emelec.

On 22 July 2018, Preciado was announced at Santos Laguna. On 9 February 2023, his contract was terminated with the club.

On 3 August 2023, Preciado was announced at Guayaquil City.

On 8 March 2024, Preciado was announced at Querétaro.

Preciado was announced at Aldosivi on 19 January 2025.

== International career ==
Preciado was selected in the 23-man Ecuador squad for the 2019 Copa América, released on 20 May 2019.

Preciado was selected in the 28 player Ecuador squad for the 2021 Copa América.

Preciado was named in the Ecuadorian squad for the 2022 FIFA World Cup.

=== Statistics ===
As of 1 February 2022

Ecuador
| Year | Apps | Goals |
|---|---|---|
| 2017 | 5 | 0 |
| 2018 | 6 | 0 |
| 2019 | 5 | 1 |
| 2021 | 9 | 2 |
| 2022 | 2 | 0 |
| Total | 27 | 3 |

=== Goals ===
List of international goals scored by Ayrton Preciado
| No. | Date | Venue | Opponent | Score | Result | Competition |
|---|---|---|---|---|---|---|
| 1 | 9 June 2019 | AT&T Stadium, Arlington, United States | Mexico | 2–3 | 2–3 | Friendly |
| 2 | 20 June 2021 | Estádio Olímpico Nilton Santos, Rio de Janeiro, Brazil | Venezuela | 1–0 | 2–2 | 2021 Copa América |
| 3 | 23 June 2021 | Estádio Olímpico Pedro Ludovico, Goiânia, Brazil | Peru | 2–0 | 2–2 | 2021 Copa América |
