= Edson Castillo =

Venezuelan footballer (born 1994)

Personal information
- Full name: Edson Daniel Castillo García
- Date of birth: 18 May 1994 (age 32)
- Place of birth: Puerto Ordaz, Venezuela
- Height: 1.76 m (5 ft 9 in)
- Position: Midfielder

Team information
- Current team: Carabobo

Youth career
- Mineros

Senior career*
Years	Team	Apps	(Gls)
2010–2016	Mineros	101	(2)
2016–2017	Neftchi Baku	20	(0)
2017	→ Mineros (loan)	10	(0)
2018	Academia Puerto Cabello	28	(3)
2019	Monagas	30	(8)
2020	→ Zacatepec (loan)	6	(0)
2021–2022	Caracas	53	(7)
2023	Monagas	11	(3)
2023–2025	Kaizer Chiefs	34	(3)
2026–	Carabobo	1	(0)

International career^{‡}
2011	Venezuela U17	3	(1)
2013	Venezuela U20	1	(0)
2021–	Venezuela	10	(1)
- * Club domestic league appearances and goals as of 28 September 2024 ‡ National team caps and goals as of 23:21, 10 October 2024 (UTC)

Edson Daniel Castillo García (born 18 May 1994) is a Venezuelan footballer who plays as a midfielder for Carabobo.

== Career ==
=== Club ===
Edson Castillo began his career at Mineros, made his debut in the Venezuelan Primera División at the age of 16, against Aragua on 17 October 2010.

In June 2016, Castillo moved to Azerbaijan Premier League side Neftchi Baku.

In July 2017, Neftchi Baku announced that Castillo had moved back to Mineros on loan until the end of 2017. On 18 December 2017, Neftchi Baku announced that they had parted ways with Castillo by mutual consent.

In July 2023, Castillo signed for South African Premier Division side Kaizer Chiefs on a two-year deal. He made his debut in a 0–0 draw with Chippa United on 6 August.He scored his first goal for the club in the 2023-24 MTN 8 quarter final against Cape Town City FC which resulted the match to end 2–1 to send Kaizer Chiefs to the semi final

=== International ===
Castillo played with U-17 at Sudamericana sub-17 in Ecuador and with U-20 at Sudamericana sub-20 in Argentina.

He made his debut for Venezuela national football team on 13 June 2021, in the 2021 Copa América opening game against Brazil. He substituted Cristian Cásseres Jr. in the 83rd minute as Venezuela lost 0–3.

== Career statistics ==
=== Club ===
As of match played 28 September 2024

Appearances and goals by club, season and competition
Club	Season	League			National Cup		League Cup		Continental		Other		Total	
Club	Season	Division	Apps	Goals	Apps	Goals	Apps	Goals	Apps	Goals	Apps	Goals	Apps	Goals
Mineros	2010–11	Venezuelan Primera División	3	0			-		-		-		3	0
Mineros	2011–12	Venezuelan Primera División	11	0			-		-		-		11	0
Mineros	2012–13	Venezuelan Primera División	14	0			-		3	0	-		17	0
Mineros	2013–14	Venezuelan Primera División	19	1			-		1	0	-		20	1
Mineros	2014–15	Venezuelan Primera División	22	0			-		2	0	-		24	0
Mineros	2015	Venezuelan Primera División	12	0	0	0	-		-		-		12	0
Mineros	2016	Venezuelan Primera División	20	1	0	0	-		-		-		20	1
Mineros	Total		101	2			-	-	5	0	-	-	106	2
Neftchi Baku	2016–17	Azerbaijan Premier League	20	0	3	0	-		4	0	-		27	0
Neftchi Baku	2017–18	Azerbaijan Premier League	0	0	0	0	-		-		-		0	0
Neftchi Baku	Total		20	0	3	0	-	-	4	0	-	-	27	0
Mineros (loan)	2017	Venezuelan Primera División	10	0	6	2	–		–		5	1	21	3
Kaizer Chiefs	2023–24	DStv Premiership	27	3	1	0	–		0	0	3	2	31	5
Kaizer Chiefs	2024–25	DStv Premiership	3	0	0	0	–		–		0	0	3	0
Kaizer Chiefs	Total		30	3	1	0	–		–		3	2	34	5
Career total			161	5	10	2	–		9	0	7	3	188	10

=== International ===
As of match played 10 October 2024

Appearances and goals by national team and year
National team	Year	Apps	Goals
Venezuela	2021	6	1
Venezuela	2023	2	0
Venezuela	2024	2	0
Total		10	1

== International goals ==
No.	Date	Venue	Opponent	Score	Result	Competition	Ref.
1.	20 June 2021	Estádio Olímpico Nilton Santos, Rio de Janeiro, Brazil	Ecuador	1–1	2–2	2021 Copa América	

== Honours ==
Mineros

- Copa Venezuela (2): 2011, 2017
