= Rubén Cordano =

Bolivian footballer (born 1998)

Personal information
- Full name: Rubén Cordano Justiniano
- Date of birth: 16 October 1998 (age 28)
- Place of birth: Bolivia
- Height: 1.81 m (5 ft 11 in)
- Position: Goalkeeper

Team information
- Current team: Bolívar
- Number: 12

Youth career
- 2008–2010: Academia Tahuichi
- 2010–2013: Sólo Arqueros
- 2013–2017: Blooming

Senior career*
| Years | Team | Apps | (Gls) |
| 2017–2020 | Blooming | 81 | (0) |
| 2020–2023 | Bolívar | 64 | (0) |
| 2024 | Oriente Petrolero | 7 | (0) |
| 2024– | Bolívar | 21 | (0) |

International career^{‡}
| 2015 | Bolivia U17 | 1 | (0) |
| 2017 | Bolivia U20 | 4 | (0) |
| 2019– | Bolivia | 5 | (0) |
| 2020 | Bolivia U23 | 4 | (0) |
- * Club domestic league appearances and goals as of 30 December 2025 ‡ National team caps and goals as of 2:30, 3 December 2023 (UTC)

Rubén Cordano Justiniano (born 16 October 1998) is a Bolivian professional footballer who plays as a goalkeeper for Bolívar and the Bolivia national team.

== International career ==
Cordano made his senior debut for the Bolivia national football team in a 1-0 friendly loss to South Korea on 22 March 2019.
