= Alexis Arias (footballer) =

Peruvian footballer (born 1995)

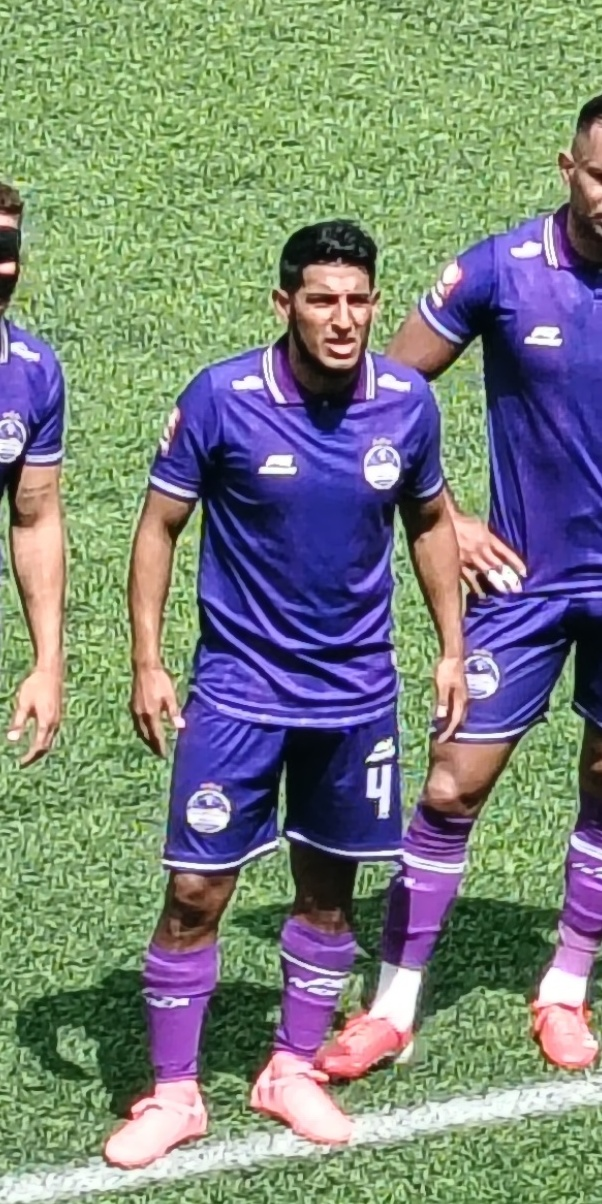

Personal information
- Full name: Alexis Arias Tuesta
- Date of birth: 13 December 1995 (age 30)
- Place of birth: Bellavista, Peru
- Height: 1.63 m (5 ft 4 in)
- Position: Midfielder

Team information
- Current team: Comerciantes Unidos
- Number: 4

Youth career
- 2003–: Sport Boys
- Coronel Bolognesi
- 2010–2013: Twente
- 2013–2014: Esther Grande

Senior career*
Years	Team	Apps	(Gls)
2014–2025	Melgar	322	(20)
2026–	Comerciantes Unidos	0	(0)

International career^{‡}
2015	Peru U22	5	(2)
2019–2022	Peru	5	(0)
- * Club domestic league appearances and goals as of 30 December 2025 ‡ National team caps and goals as of 12:43, 18 July 2021 (UTC)

Alexis Arias Tuesta (born 13 December 1995) is a Peruvian professional footballer who plays as a midfielder for Comerciantes Unidos and the Peru national team.

== International career ==
Arias represented the Peru U22 team at the 2015 Pan Am Games. He made his debut for the senior Peru national team in a friendly 2–0 loss to El Salvador on 27 March 2019.

== Honours ==
FBC Melgar

- Peruvian Primera División: 2015
- Torneo Clausura 2018
- Torneo Apertura 2022
