= Francisco La Mantía =

Venezuelan footballer (born 1996)

Personal information
- Full name: Francisco Andrés La Mantia Pipaón
- Date of birth: 24 February 1996 (age 30)
- Place of birth: Mérida, Venezuela
- Height: 1.79 m (5 ft 10 1/2 in)
- Position: Midfielder

Team information
- Current team: Caracas FC
- Number: 2

Youth career
- –2013: Estudiantes de Mérida

Senior career*
Years	Team	Apps	(Gls)
2013–2014	Estudiantes de Mérida	13	(1)
2014–2016	Aragua	17	(0)
2015–2016	→ Las Palmas Atlético (loan)	?	(?)
2016–2017	Deportivo Anzoátegui	14	(0)
2017–2023	Deportivo La Guaira	106	(2)
2023	Riteriai	33	(1)
2024–	Caracas	15	(0)

International career^{‡}
2013–	Venezuela U-17	13	(1)
2017–	Venezuela	3	(0)
- * Club domestic league appearances and goals as of 14 September 2024 (UTC) ‡ National team caps and goals as of 20:37, 27 January 2022 (UTC)

Francisco Andrés La Mantia Pipaón is a Venezuelan professional footballer who plays as a midfielder for Caracas FC.

== Club career ==
In February 2023 he signed with Lithuanian club Riteriai. On 3 March 2023 he made his debut in A Lyga against FA Šiauliai.

On 6 June 2023 he scored in A Lyga match against FK Kauno Žalgiris (match ended 1:1).

On 16 November 2023 was announced, that player left Riteriai Club.
