= Bernaldo Manzano =

Venezuelan footballer (born 1990)

Personal information
- Full name: Bernaldo Antonio Manzano Varón
- Date of birth: 2 July 1990 (age 36)
- Place of birth: El Playón, Venezuela
- Height: 1.75 m (5 ft 9 in)
- Position: Midfielder

Senior career*
Years	Team	Apps	(Gls)
2014–2017	Portuguesa	82	(15)
2016–2022	Deportivo Lara	89	(11)
2019	→ Deportes Tolima (loan)	9	(0)
2020	→ Atlético Bucaramanga (loan)	10	(0)
2023	Portuguesa	26	(1)

International career^{‡}
2019–	Venezuela	7	(0)
- * Club domestic league appearances and goals as of 02:11, 17 December 2020 (UTC). ‡ National team caps and goals as of 21:02, 27 January 2022 (UTC)

Bernaldo Antonio Manzano Varón (born 2 July 1990) is a Venezuelan footballer as a midfielder.

== International career ==
Manzano made his professional debut for the Venezuela national football team in a 1-1 friendly tie with Ecuador on 1 June 2019.
