= Pedro Ortiz (footballer, born 1990) =

Ecuadorian footballer (born 1990)

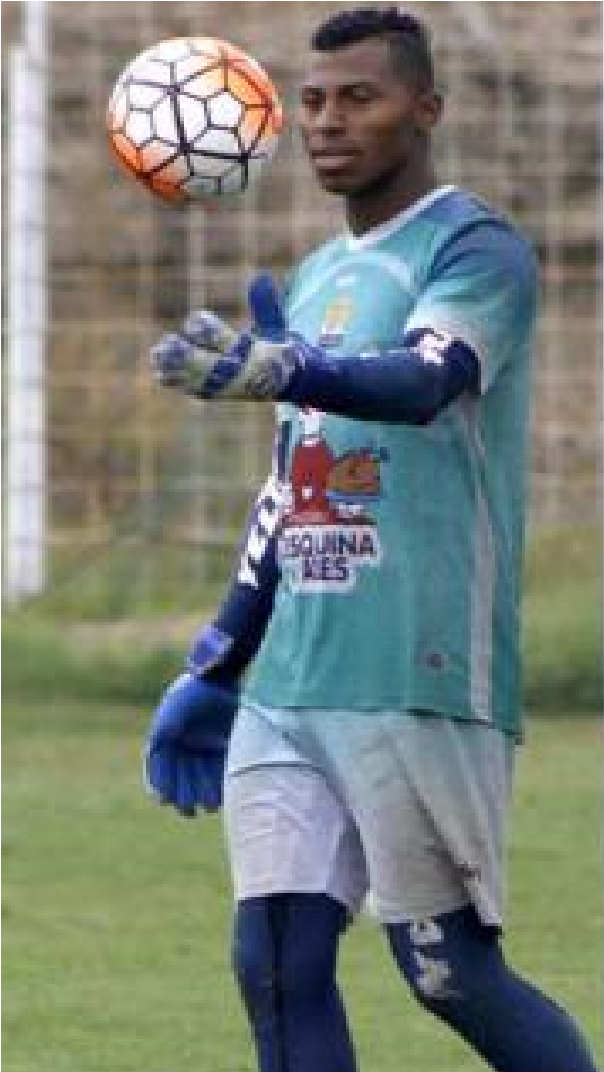
- Pedro Ortiz with Delfín in 2018

Personal information
- Full name: Pedro Alfredo Ortiz Angulo
- Date of birth: 19 February 1990 (age 36)
- Place of birth: Esmeraldas, Ecuador
- Height: 1.87 m (6 ft 2 in)
- Position: Goalkeeper

Team information
- Current team: Emelec
- Number: 12

Youth career
- 2007: Emelec
- 2008–2009: Deportivo Azogues

Senior career*
Years	Team	Apps	(Gls)
2009–2015	Deportivo Azogues	187	(0)
2016–2020	Delfín	141	(0)
2020–	Emelec	185	(0)

International career^{‡}
2017–	Ecuador	6	(0)
- * Club domestic league appearances and goals as of 22 March 2026. ‡ National team caps and goals as of 26 January 2022.

Pedro Alfredo Ortiz Angulo (born 19 February 1990) is an Ecuadorian professional footballer who plays as a goalkeeper for CS Emelec and the Ecuador national team.

== Club career ==
Ortiz made his professional debut while playing for Deportivo Azogues in 2009.

== International career ==
Ortiz made his senior debut for Ecuador on 5 September 2019 in a 1–0 friendly win over Peru.

== Career statistics ==
=== Club ===
As of match played 22 March 2026

Appearances and goals by club, season and competition
Club	Season	League		Cup		Continental		Total	
Club	Season	Apps	Goals	Apps	Goals	Apps	Goals	Apps	Goals
Deportivo Azogues	2009	6	0	–		–		6	0
Deportivo Azogues	2010	25	0	–		–		25	0
Deportivo Azogues	2011	40	0	–		–		40	0
Deportivo Azogues	2012	34	0	–		–		34	0
Deportivo Azogues	2013	0	0	–		–		0	0
Deportivo Azogues	2014	43	0	–		–		43	0
Deportivo Azogues	2015	39	0	–		–		39	0
Deportivo Azogues	Total	187	0	0	0	0	0	187	0
Delfín	2016	19	0	–		–		19	0
Delfín	2017	45	0	–		–		45	0
Delfín	2018	41	0	–		5	0	46	0
Delfín	2019	36	0	8	0	4	0	48	0
Delfín	Total	141	0	8	0	9	0	158	0
Emelec	2020	28	0	0	0	4	0	32	0
Emelec	2021	32	0	0	0	8	0	40	0
Emelec	2022	28	0	2	0	8	0	38	0
Emelec	2023	30	0	0	0	10	0	40	0
Emelec	2024	24	0	2	0	0	0	26	0
Emelec	2025	38	0	5	0	0	0	43	0
Emelec	2026	5	0	0	0	0	0	5	0
Emelec	Total	185	0	9	0	30	0	224	0
Career total		513	0	17	0	39	0	569	0
