= Luis Mago =

Venezuelan footballer (born 1994)

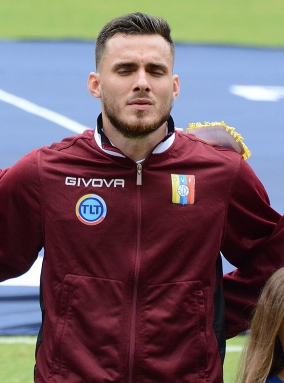
- Mago with Venezuela in 2019

Personal information
- Full name: Luis Enrique Del Pino Mago
- Date of birth: 15 September 1994 (age 32)
- Place of birth: Cumaná, Venezuela
- Height: 1.84 m (6 ft 1/2 in)
- Position: Centre-back

Team information
- Current team: Muğlaspor

Youth career
- Deportivo Anzoátegui

Senior career*
Years	Team	Apps	(Gls)
2014–2016	Deportivo Anzoátegui	37	(1)
2015	→ Carabobo (loan)	9	(0)
2017–2018	Carabobo	52	(4)
2019	Palestino	17	(1)
2020–2021	Universidad de Chile	20	(0)
2022	Ñublense	11	(0)
2022–2023	Banfield	23	(0)
2024	Al-Najma	13	(1)
2024	Carabobo	4	(0)
2025–2026	Caracas	36	(0)
2026–	Muğlaspor	0	(0)

International career^{‡}
2017	Venezuela U21	4	(0)
2018–2023	Venezuela	19	(2)
- * Club domestic league appearances and goals as of 3:45, 24 February 2026 (UTC) ‡ National team caps and goals as of 3:45, 24 February 2026 (UTC)

Luis Enrique Del Pino Mago (born 15 September 1994), known as Luis Mago, is a Venezuelan footballer who plays as a centre-back for Muğlaspor and the Venezuela national team.

== International career ==
He made his debut on September 7, 2018, with the Venezuelan national team against Colombia, where he played for 28 minutes, standing out with a strong performance in defense.

He scored his first goal on October 16, 2018, in a friendly match against the United Arab Emirates national team in the first minute of play, following a cross from Rómulo Otero.

He scored his second goal on November 17, 2020, against Chile in a match corresponding to the 2022 World Cup Qualifiers.

=== International goals ===
Scores and results list Venezuela's goal tally first.

No.	Date	Venue	Opponent	Score	Result	Competition
1.	16 October 2018	Estadi Olímpic Lluís Companys, Barcelona, Spain	United Arab Emirates	1–0	2–0	Friendly
2.	17 November 2020	Estadio Olímpico, Caracas, Venezuela	Chile	1–0	2–1	2022 FIFA World Cup qualification

== Personal life ==
In August 2019, Mago obtained British citizenship by naturalization.
