= 2021 Copa América =

47th edition of the football championship

CONMEBOL Copa América 2021
- Vibra o Continente (Vibra el Continente); English: Rocking the Continent

Tournament details
- Host country: Brazil
- Dates: 13 June – 10 July
- Teams: 10 (from 1 confederation)
- Venues: 5 (in 4 host cities)

Final positions
- Champions: Argentina (15th title)
- Runners-up: Brazil
- Third place: Colombia
- Fourth place: Peru

Tournament statistics
- Matches played: 28
- Goals scored: 65 (2.32 per match)
- Attendance: 7,800 (279 per match)
- Top scorer(s): (Argentina) Lionel Messi (Colombia) Luis Díaz (4 goals each)
- Best player: (Argentina) Lionel Messi
- Best goalkeeper: (Argentina) Emiliano Martínez
- Fair play award: Brazil

The 2021 Copa América was the 47th edition of the Copa América, the international men's football championship organised by South America's football ruling body CONMEBOL. The tournament took place in Brazil from 13 June to 10 July 2021. It was originally scheduled to take place from 12 June to 12 July 2020 in Argentina and Colombia as the 2020 Copa América. On 17 March 2020, CONMEBOL announced that due to the COVID-19 pandemic in South America, the tournament had been postponed for a year, in conjunction with UEFA's decision to also postpone UEFA Euro 2020 to 2021. This was the first time since 1991 where no guest nation took part in the tournament and the most recent Copa América hosted in South America.

On 20 May 2021, Colombia was removed as co-host amid ongoing protests against President Iván Duque Márquez, and Argentina was then removed on 30 May due to COVID-19 issues. The following day CONMEBOL confirmed Brazil as the new host of the tournament.

Hosts Brazil were the title holders, having won their ninth title in 2019, which they also hosted. Argentina won their record-tying fifteenth title after defeating Brazil 1–0 in the final, marking the first time Brazil failed to win the competition on home soil. Argentina secured a first senior trophy since the 1993 edition of the same tournament, also equalling Uruguay's overall record of Copa América titles. The title qualified Argentina to play the CONMEBOL–UEFA Cup of Champions in 2022 against Italy, winners of the UEFA Euro 2020. Argentina's Lionel Messi and Brazil's Neymar were joint winners of the Best Player Award.

== Background ==
In March 2017, CONMEBOL reportedly proposed that the Copa América take place in 2020 as part of a calendar change. Following the 2019 edition in Brazil, the quadrennial tournament would move back from odd to even years starting in 2020, with the following edition taking place in United States in 2024, having previously held the one-off Copa América Centenario in 2016, which celebrated the centenary of CONMEBOL and the Copa América. This would move the tournament in line with the UEFA European Championship, which is also held in even years with a 2020 edition taking place. On 18 September 2018, plans for a calendar change were confirmed by CONMEBOL president Alejandro Domínguez after submitting an official request to FIFA.

On 26 October 2018 at the FIFA Council meeting in Kigali, Rwanda, the request was approved for the Copa América to take place in even years, starting with the 2020 edition. The tournament was originally scheduled to take place between 12 June and 12 July 2020, the same dates as UEFA Euro 2020.

On 13 March 2019, CONMEBOL announced Argentina and Colombia as co-hosts of the 2020 event after the United States bid was rejected. It was officially announced the same day when CONMEBOL approved of the joint hosting. It was officially awarded on 9 April 2019 at the CONMEBOL Congress in Rio de Janeiro, Brazil.

On 20 May 2021, due to security concerns amid protests against the government of President Iván Duque Márquez, Colombia was dropped as co-host of the tournament. On 30 May 2021, Argentina later dropped as co-host of the tournament due to COVID-19 travel restriction.

== Impact of the COVID-19 pandemic ==
In March 2020, the COVID-19 pandemic in South America began impacting football. FIFA announced that the first two rounds of the South American qualifiers for the 2022 World Cup, due to take place in March, were postponed, while CONMEBOL temporarily suspended the Copa Libertadores. On 17 March 2020, CONMEBOL announced that the Copa América would be postponed to the following year, taking place from 11 June to 11 July 2021, in conjunction with UEFA and IOC decision to also postpone UEFA Euro 2020 and 2020 Summer Olympics to 2021, in order to protect the health and safety of the teams, media, visitors and host cities. On the following day, the Bureau of the FIFA Council approved the date change in the FIFA International Match Calendar. As a result, the expanded FIFA Club World Cup, which was due to take place in June and July 2020, was rescheduled to 2021.

On 22 February 2021, two invited guest teams Australia and Qatar pulled out of tournament, due to their commitments for the second round of 2022 FIFA World Cup Asian qualification.

On 20 May 2021, CONMEBOL announced that Colombia would be withdrawn as host due to protests. Two days later, Argentina went under a nine-day lockdown due to soaring COVID-19 cases, which included the suspension of all domestic football. On 30 May 2021, CONMEBOL announced that due to the current circumstances in the country, Copa América would be pulled from Argentina, and that they were looking at bids from other countries to host the tournament. This reportedly included a bid from the United States, after that bid was initially rejected. It was reported that the Argentine government had made increasing demands for biosecurity protocols that CONMEBOL found unreasonable. On 31 May Brazil was confirmed as the new host.

All matches in the tournament were held behind closed doors, except the final, during which 10% of Maracanã Stadium's capacity was allowed for guests with a negative COVID-19 test before entering. All delegations, each limited to 65 members, were vaccinated, as were the match officials.

== Venues ==
On 1 June 2021, the Brazilian government and Brazilian Football Confederation announced the cities of Brasília, Goiânia, Cuiabá and Rio de Janeiro as the host venues of the competition, with the Maracanã, Nacional Mané Garrincha, Pantanal and the Olímpico Pedro Ludovico stadiums used for matches. On 2 June, the CBF decided to use the Estádio Olímpico Nilton Santos as the second stadium in Rio de Janeiro. The government also allocated resources in the federal budget to provide the necessary support for the CONMEBOL's tournament logistics and security. The Estádio Nacional Mané Garrincha hosted the opening match on 13 June, and the final was held at the Estadio do Maracanã on 10 July.

Rio de Janeiro			Location of the host cities of the 2021 Copa America.
Estádio do Maracanã		Estádio Olímpico Nilton Santos	Location of the host cities of the 2021 Copa America.
Capacity: 78,838		Capacity: 46,931	Location of the host cities of the 2021 Copa America.
Brasília	Cuiabá	Goiânia	Location of the host cities of the 2021 Copa America.
Estádio Nacional Mané Garrincha	Arena Pantanal	Estádio Olímpico Pedro Ludovico	Location of the host cities of the 2021 Copa America.
Capacity: 72,788	Capacity: 44,000	Capacity: 13,500	Location of the host cities of the 2021 Copa America.

=== Original venues ===
On 20 November 2019, CONMEBOL published a document confirming eight venues, Estadio Mario Alberto Kempes in Córdoba, Estadio Malvinas Argentinas in Mendoza, Estadio Monumental in Buenos Aires and Estadio Ciudad de La Plata in La Plata for Argentina and Estadio Olímpico Pascual Guerrero in Cali, Estadio Atanasio Girardot in Medellín, Estadio Metropolitano Roberto Meléndez in Barranquilla and Estadio Nemesio Camacho El Campín in Bogotá for Colombia. Moreover, Estadio San Juan del Bicentenario in San Juan (Argentina) and Estadio Hernán Ramírez Villegas in Pereira (Colombia) were also nominated but not confirmed, being finally dismissed.

On 3 December 2019, prior to the draw, it was known that Estadio Único in Santiago del Estero was included as one of the Argentine venues.

On 15 March 2021, the Estadio Ciudad de La Plata in La Plata venue was ruled out as a result of the schedule shortening.

Colombia would have hosted the North Zone group, while Argentina would have hosted the South Zone group. Each country would also have hosted two quarter-finals and one semi-final. The third place match and final would have been played in Colombia.

== Teams ==
All ten CONMEBOL national teams participated in the competition, divided into two geographical zones for the group stage.

In June 2019, the CONMEBOL Council officially approved the participation of Australia and Qatar as the two invited teams, who were the previous two winners of the AFC Asian Cup. Australia would have made their debut appearance in the Copa América, while Qatar would be making their second appearance, having participated in the previous edition. However, on 23 February 2021, Football Australia and the Qatar Football Association announced their withdrawal from the tournament, due to the postponement of the remainder of the AFC second round of 2022 FIFA World Cup qualification to June 2021. Following the withdrawals, a CONMEBOL spokesperson said that there was a calendar issue that stopped Australia and Qatar, that he had already seen interest from other national teams to play as guests in their place and that he would like to have 12 teams. The spokesperson added that if no replacements were found, the tournament would be played with 10 teams (for the first time since 1991).

CONMEBOL North Zone

- Brazil (title holders and hosts)
- Colombia
- Ecuador
- Peru
- Venezuela

CONMEBOL South Zone

- Argentina
- Bolivia
- Chile
- Paraguay
- Uruguay

=== Squads ===
Each team had to submit a list of up to 28 players (expanded from 23), including at least three goalkeepers.

== Draw ==
The team allocations of the CONMEBOL members, divided into North Zone and South Zone, were announced on 9 April 2019. The group stage draw was held on 3 December 2019, 19:30 COT (UTC−5), in Cartagena. Original co-hosts Argentina and Colombia were automatically allocated to positions A1 and B1, respectively. After the draw, the zones for the two invited nations and the positions of teams within the groups were as follows:

Group A (South Zone)
Pos	Team
A1	Argentina
~~A2~~	~~Australia~~
A3	Bolivia
A4	Uruguay
A5	Chile
A6	Paraguay

Group B (North Zone)
Pos	Team
B1	Colombia
B2	Brazil
~~B3~~	~~Qatar~~
B4	Venezuela
B5	Ecuador
B6	Peru

Group stage schedule
Matchday	Dates	Group A matches	Group B matches
Matchday 1	13–14 June 2021	A1 v A5, ~~A2 v A4~~, A6 v A3	B1 v B5, B2 v B4, ~~B6 v B3~~
Matchday 2	17–18 June 2021	A1 v A4, ~~A6 v A2~~, A5 v A3	B1 v B4, B6 v B2, ~~B5 v B3~~
Matchday 3	20–21 June 2021	A1 v A6, ~~A2 v A3~~, A4 v A5	B1 v B6, ~~B2 v B3~~, B4 v B5
Matchday 4	23–24 June 2021	~~A2 v A1~~, A3 v A4, A5 v A6	B2 v B1, ~~B3 v B4~~, B5 v B6
Matchday 5	27–28 June 2021	A3 v A1, ~~A5 v A2~~, A4 v A6	~~B3 v B1~~, B5 v B2, B4 v B6

On 2 June 2021, Argentina and Brazil were allocated to positions A1 and B1, respectively, in the competition calendar update.

== Match officials ==
On 21 April 2021, CONMEBOL announced a total of 14 referees, 22 assistant referees, 16 video assistant referees (VAR), and 10 support referees appointed for the tournament. This edition featured the participation of a Spanish refereeing team as part of the memorandum of understanding signed by CONMEBOL and UEFA in February 2020, which included a referee exchange programme.

On 5 June 2021, Uruguayan video assistant referees Leodán González and Daniel Fedorczuk were replaced by Andrés Cunha, also from Uruguay. In addition, Juan Soto from Venezuela and Jhon Alexander León from Colombia replaced the video assistant referee Nicolás Gallo and the assistant referee Miguel Roldán respectively, both from Colombia. Nicolás Gallo and Miguel Roldán had previously been suspended indefinitely as a result of their performance in the match between Uruguay and Paraguay valid for the CONMEBOL World Cup qualifiers.

Later, Leodán González and Daniel Fedorczuk were summoned again to join the Uruguayan referee team.

Association	Referees	Assistant referees	Video assistant referees	Support referees	Support assistant referees
Argentina	Néstor Pitana; Patricio Loustau	Ezequiel Brailovsky; Gabriel Chade	Mauro Vigliano; Facundo Tello		Cristian Navarro
Bolivia	Gery Vargas	José Antelo; Edwar Saavedra			Ariel Guizada
Brazil	Wilton Sampaio; Raphael Claus	Danilo Manis; Bruno Pires	Wagner Reway; Rafael Traci		Rafael Alves
Chile	Roberto Tobar	Christian Schiemann; Claudio Ríos	Julio Bascuñán; Cristián Garay	Ángelo Hermosilla	
Colombia	Wilmar Roldán; Andrés Rojas	Alexander Guzmán; Jhon Alexander León	Jhon Ospina		Sebastián Vela
Ecuador	Guillermo Guerrero	Christian Lescano; Byron Romero		Augusto Aragón	
Paraguay	Eber Aquino	Eduardo Cardozo; Milciades Saldívar	Derlis López; Juan Gabriel Benítez		José Cuevas
Peru	Víctor Hugo Carrillo	Jonny Bossio; Raúl López Cruz	Diego Haro	Kevin Ortega	
Spain	Jesús Gil Manzano	Diego Barbero Sevilla; Ángel Nevado Rodríguez	Ricardo de Burgos Bengoetxea; José Luis Munuera Montero		
Uruguay	Esteban Ostojich; Leodán González	Carlos Barreiro; Martín Soppi	Andrés Cunha; Daniel Fedorczuk	Andrés Matonte	
Venezuela	Alexis Herrera	Carlos López; Jorge Urrego	Jesús Valenzuela; Juan Soto		Alberto Ponte

== Group stage ==
The original schedule and kick-off times for the tournament were announced on 3 December 2019 and 4 March 2020 respectively. On 17 March 2020, the tournament was postponed until 2021 and the new schedule was announced on 13 August 2020. Following the withdrawals of Qatar and Australia, the schedule was shortened and it was announced on 15 March 2021. The final match schedule with Brazil as host country was announced on 2 June 2021.

All match times listed are in BRT (UTC−3), as listed by CONMEBOL. Cuiabá is located in a different time zone, AMT (UTC−4), so the local time is also given.

The top four teams of each group advanced to the quarter-finals.

Tiebreakers

The ranking of teams in the group stage was determined as follows (Regulations Article 10.6):

1. Points obtained in all group matches (three points for a win, one for a draw, none for a defeat);
2. Goal difference in all group matches;
3. Number of goals scored in all group matches;
4. Points obtained in the matches played between the teams in question;
5. Goal difference in the matches played between the teams in question;
6. Number of goals scored in the matches played between the teams in question;
7. Fair play points in all group matches (only one deduction could be applied to a player in a single match):
  - Yellow card: −1 points;
  - Indirect red card (second yellow card): −3 points;
  - Direct red card: −4 points;
  - Yellow card and direct red card: −5 points;
8. Drawing of lots.

=== Group A (South Zone) ===
Pos	Team	Pld	W	D	L	GF	GA	GD	Pts	Qualification
1	Argentina	4	3	1	0	7	2	+5	10	Advance to knockout stage
2	Uruguay	4	2	1	1	4	2	+2	7	Advance to knockout stage
3	Paraguay	4	2	0	2	5	3	+2	6	Advance to knockout stage
4	Chile	4	1	2	1	3	4	−1	5	Advance to knockout stage
5	Bolivia	4	0	0	4	2	10	−8	0	

Source: CONMEBOL
14 June 2021
18:00 BRT (UTC−3)

Argentina	1–1	Chile
Messi 33'	Report	Vargas 57'

Estádio Olímpico Nilton Santos, Rio de Janeiro
Attendance: 0 (Note: Due to the COVID-19 pandemic in South America, the match was played behind closed doors.)
Referee: Wilmar Roldán (Colombia)
14 June 2021
21:00 BRT (UTC−3)

Paraguay	3–1	Bolivia
Kaku 62'; Á. Romero 65', 80'	Report	Saavedra 10' (pen.)

Estádio Olímpico Pedro Ludovico, Goiânia
Attendance: 0
Referee: Diego Haro (Peru)

18 June 2021
17:00 AMT (UTC−4)

Chile	1–0	Bolivia
Brereton 10'	Report

Arena Pantanal, Cuiabá
Attendance: 0
Referee: Jesús Gil Manzano (Spain)
18 June 2021
21:00 BRT (UTC−3)

Argentina	1–0	Uruguay
Rodríguez 13'	Report

Estádio Nacional Mané Garrincha, Brasília
Attendance: 0
Referee: Wilton Sampaio (Brazil)

21 June 2021
17:00 AMT (UTC−4)

Uruguay	1–1	Chile
Suárez 66'	Report	Vargas 26'

Arena Pantanal, Cuiabá
Attendance: 0
Referee: Raphael Claus (Brazil)
21 June 2021
21:00 BRT (UTC−3)

Argentina	1–0	Paraguay
Gómez 10'	Report

Estádio Nacional Mané Garrincha, Brasília
Attendance: 0
Referee: Jesús Valenzuela (Venezuela)

24 June 2021
17:00 AMT (UTC−4)

Bolivia	0–2	Uruguay
	Report	Quinteros 40' (o.g.); Cavani 79'

Arena Pantanal, Cuiabá
Attendance: 0
Referee: Alexis Herrera (Venezuela)
24 June 2021
21:00 BRT (UTC−3)

Chile	0–2	Paraguay
	Report	Samudio 33'; Almirón 58' (pen.)

Estádio Nacional Mané Garrincha, Brasília
Attendance: 0
Referee: Wilmar Roldán (Colombia)

28 June 2021
21:00 BRT (UTC−3)

Uruguay	1–0	Paraguay
Cavani 21' (pen.)	Report

Estádio Olímpico Nilton Santos, Rio de Janeiro
Attendance: 0
Referee: Raphael Claus (Brazil)
28 June 2021
20:00 AMT (UTC−4)

Bolivia	1–4	Argentina
Saavedra 60'	Report	Gómez 6'; Messi 33' (pen.), 42'; La. Martínez 65'

Arena Pantanal, Cuiabá
Attendance: 0
Referee: Andrés Rojas (Colombia)

=== Group B (North Zone) ===
Pos	Team	Pld	W	D	L	GF	GA	GD	Pts	Qualification
1	Brazil (H)	4	3	1	0	10	2	+8	10	Advance to knockout stage
2	Peru	4	2	1	1	5	7	−2	7	Advance to knockout stage
3	Colombia	4	1	1	2	3	4	−1	4	Advance to knockout stage
4	Ecuador	4	0	3	1	5	6	−1	3	Advance to knockout stage
5	Venezuela	4	0	2	2	2	6	−4	2	

Source: CONMEBOL
(H) Hosts
13 June 2021
18:00 BRT (UTC−3)

Brazil	3–0	Venezuela
Marquinhos 23'; Neymar 64' (pen.); Gabriel Barbosa 89'	Report

Estádio Nacional Mané Garrincha, Brasília
Attendance: 0
Referee: Esteban Ostojich (Uruguay)
13 June 2021
20:00 AMT (UTC−4)

Colombia	1–0	Ecuador
Cardona 42'	Report

Arena Pantanal, Cuiabá
Attendance: 0
Referee: Néstor Pitana (Argentina)

17 June 2021
18:00 BRT (UTC−3)

Colombia	0–0	Venezuela
	Report

Estádio Olímpico Pedro Ludovico, Goiânia
Attendance: 0
Referee: Eber Aquino (Paraguay)
17 June 2021
21:00 BRT (UTC−3)

Brazil	4–0	Peru
Alex Sandro 12'; Neymar 68'; Ribeiro 89'; Richarlison 90+3'	Report

Estádio Olímpico Nilton Santos, Rio de Janeiro
Attendance: 0
Referee: Patricio Loustau (Argentina)

20 June 2021
18:00 BRT (UTC−3)

Venezuela	2–2	Ecuador
Castillo 51'; Hernández 90+1'	Report	Ay. Preciado 39'; Plata 71'

Estádio Olímpico Nilton Santos, Rio de Janeiro
Attendance: 0
Referee: Roberto Tobar (Chile)
20 June 2021
21:00 BRT (UTC−3)

Colombia	1–2	Peru
Borja 53' (pen.)	Report	Peña 17'; Mina 64' (o.g.)

Estádio Olímpico Pedro Ludovico, Goiânia
Attendance: 0
Referee: Esteban Ostojich (Uruguay)

23 June 2021
18:00 BRT (UTC−3)

Ecuador	2–2	Peru
Tapia 23' (o.g.); Ay. Preciado 45+3'	Report	Lapadula 49'; Carrillo 54'

Estádio Olímpico Pedro Ludovico, Goiânia
Attendance: 0
Referee: Jesús Gil Manzano (Spain)
23 June 2021
21:00 BRT (UTC−3)

Brazil	2–1	Colombia
Firmino 78'; Casemiro 90+10'	Report	Díaz 10'

Estádio Olímpico Nilton Santos, Rio de Janeiro
Attendance: 0
Referee: Néstor Pitana (Argentina)

27 June 2021
18:00 BRT (UTC−3)

Brazil	1–1	Ecuador
Militão 37'	Report	Mena 53'

Estádio Olímpico Pedro Ludovico, Goiânia
Attendance: 0
Referee: Roberto Tobar (Chile)
27 June 2021
18:00 BRT (UTC−3)

Venezuela	0–1	Peru
	Report	Carrillo 48'

Estádio Nacional Mané Garrincha, Brasília
Attendance: 0
Referee: Patricio Loustau (Argentina)

== Knockout stage ==
In the knockout stage, if a match was tied after 90 minutes:

- In the quarter-finals, semi-finals, and third place play-off, extra time would not be played, and the match would be decided by a penalty shoot-out (Regulations Article 9.3).
- In the final, extra time would be played. If still tied after extra time, the match would be decided by a penalty shoot-out (Regulations Article 9.4).

=== Bracket ===
Quarter-finals
3 July – Goiânia
Argentina	3
Ecuador	0
3 July – Brasília
Uruguay	0 (2)
Colombia (p)	0 (4)
2 July – Rio de Janeiro (O. Nilton Santos)
Brazil	1
Chile	0
2 July – Goiânia
Peru (p)	3 (4)
Paraguay	3 (3)

Semi-finals
6 July – Brasília
Argentina (p)	1 (3)
Colombia	1 (2)
5 July – Rio de Janeiro (O. Nilton Santos)
Brazil	1
Peru	0

Final
10 July – Rio de Janeiro (Maracanã)
Argentina	1
Brazil	0
Third place play-off
9 July – Brasília
Colombia	3
Peru	2

=== Quarter-finals ===
2 July 2021
18:00 BRT (UTC−3)

Peru	3–3	Paraguay
Gómez 21' (o.g.); Lapadula 40'; Yotún 80'	Report	Gómez 11'; Alonso 54'; Ávalos 90'
Penalties
Lapadula (penalty scored); Yotún (penalty scored); Ormeño (penalty missed); Tapia (penalty scored); Cueva (penalty missed); Trauco (penalty scored)	4–3	(penalty scored) Á. Romero; (penalty scored) Alonso; (penalty missed) Martínez; (penalty missed) Samudio; (penalty scored) Piris Da Motta; (penalty missed) Espínola

Estádio Olímpico Pedro Ludovico, Goiânia
Attendance: 0
Referee: Esteban Ostojich (Uruguay)

2 July 2021
21:00 BRT (UTC−3)

Brazil	1–0	Chile
Paquetá 46'	Report

Estádio Olímpico Nilton Santos, Rio de Janeiro
Attendance: 0
Referee: Patricio Loustau (Argentina)

3 July 2021
19:00 BRT (UTC−3)

Uruguay	0–0	Colombia
	Report
Penalties
Cavani (penalty scored); Giménez (penalty missed); Suárez (penalty scored); Viña (penalty missed)	2–4	(penalty scored) Zapata; (penalty scored) Sánchez; (penalty scored) Mina; (penalty scored) Borja

Estádio Nacional Mané Garrincha, Brasília
Attendance: 0
Referee: Jesús Gil Manzano (Spain)

3 July 2021
22:00 BRT (UTC−3)

Argentina	3–0	Ecuador
De Paul 40'; La. Martínez 84'; Messi 90+3'	Report

Estádio Olímpico Pedro Ludovico, Goiânia
Attendance: 0
Referee: Wilton Sampaio (Brazil)

=== Semi-finals ===
5 July 2021
20:00 BRT (UTC−3)

Brazil	1–0	Peru
Paquetá 35'	Report

Estádio Olímpico Nilton Santos, Rio de Janeiro
Attendance: 0
Referee: Roberto Tobar (Chile)

6 July 2021
22:00 BRT (UTC−3)

Argentina	1–1	Colombia
La. Martínez 7'	Report	Díaz 61'
Penalties
Messi (penalty scored); De Paul (penalty missed); Paredes (penalty scored); La. Martínez (penalty scored)	3–2	(penalty scored) Cuadrado; (penalty missed) Sánchez; (penalty missed) Mina; (penalty scored) Borja; (penalty missed) Cardona

Estádio Nacional Mané Garrincha, Brasília
Attendance: 0
Referee: Jesús Valenzuela (Venezuela)

=== Third place play-off ===
9 July 2021
21:00 BRT (UTC−3)

Colombia	3–2	Peru
Cuadrado 49'; Díaz 66', 90+4'	Report	Yotún 45'; Lapadula 82'

Estádio Nacional Mané Garrincha, Brasília
Attendance: 0
Referee: Raphael Claus (Brazil)

=== Final ===
10 July 2021
21:00 BRT (UTC−3)

Argentina	1–0	Brazil
Di María 22'	Report

Estádio do Maracanã, Rio de Janeiro
Attendance: 7,800 (Note: The total capacity of the stadium to allow fans to attend the final was established at 10% due to the COVID-19 pandemic in South America.)
Referee: Esteban Ostojich (Uruguay)

== Statistics ==
=== Goalscorers ===
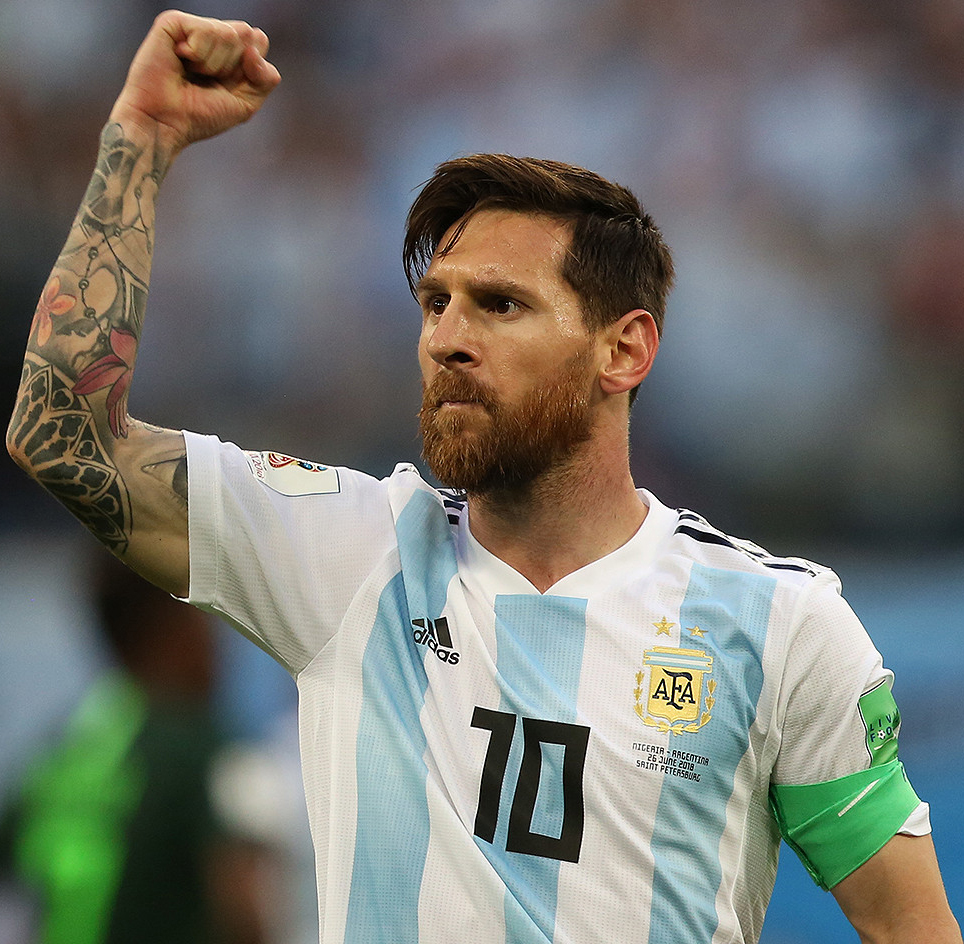
Lionel Messi, the best player and joint top scorer of the tournament.

There were 65 goals scored in 28 matches, for an average of 2.32 goals per match.

4 goals

- (Argentina) Lionel Messi
- (Colombia) Luis Díaz

3 goals

- (Argentina) Lautaro Martínez
- (Peru) Gianluca Lapadula

2 goals

- (Argentina) Alejandro Gómez
- (Bolivia) Erwin Saavedra
- (Brazil) Neymar
- (Brazil) Lucas Paquetá
- (Chile) Eduardo Vargas
- (Ecuador) Ayrton Preciado
- (Paraguay) Ángel Romero
- (Peru) André Carrillo
- (Peru) Yoshimar Yotún
- (Uruguay) Edinson Cavani

1 goal

- (Argentina) Rodrigo De Paul
- (Argentina) Ángel Di María
- (Argentina) Guido Rodríguez
- (Brazil) Gabriel Barbosa
- (Brazil) Casemiro
- (Brazil) Roberto Firmino
- (Brazil) Marquinhos
- (Brazil) Éder Militão
- (Brazil) Éverton Ribeiro
- (Brazil) Richarlison
- (Brazil) Alex Sandro
- (Chile) Ben Brereton Díaz
- (Colombia) Miguel Borja
- (Colombia) Edwin Cardona
- (Colombia) Juan Cuadrado
- (Ecuador) Ángel Mena
- (Ecuador) Gonzalo Plata
- (Paraguay) Miguel Almirón
- (Paraguay) Junior Alonso
- (Paraguay) Gabriel Ávalos
- (Paraguay) Gustavo Gómez
- (Paraguay) Kaku
- (Paraguay) Braian Samudio
- (Peru) Sergio Peña
- (Uruguay) Luis Suárez
- (Venezuela) Edson Castillo
- (Venezuela) Ronald Hernández

1 own goal

- (Bolivia) Jairo Quinteros (against Uruguay)
- (Colombia) Yerry Mina (against Peru)
- (Paraguay) Gustavo Gómez (against Peru)
- (Peru) Renato Tapia (against Ecuador)

Source: CONMEBOL

=== Discipline ===
Player	Offence(s)	Suspension(s)
(Bolivia) Jaume Cuéllar	(yellow card) (yellow-red card) in Group A vs Paraguay (matchday 1; 14 June)	Group A vs Chile (matchday 2; 18 June)
(Colombia) Mateus Uribe	(yellow card) in Group B vs Ecuador (matchday 1; 13 June); (yellow card) in Group B vs Venezuela (matchday 2; 17 June)	Group B vs Peru (matchday 3; 20 June)
(Colombia) Luis Díaz	(red card) in Group B vs Venezuela (matchday 2; 17 June)	Group B vs Peru (matchday 3; 20 June)
(Bolivia) Diego Bejarano	(yellow card) in Group A vs Paraguay (matchday 1; 14 June); (yellow card) in Group A vs Chile (matchday 2; 18 June)	Group A vs Uruguay (matchday 4; 24 June)
(Ecuador) Enner Valencia	(yellow card) in Group B vs Colombia (matchday 1; 13 June); (yellow card) in Group B vs Venezuela (matchday 3; 20 June)	Group B vs Peru (matchday 4; 23 June)
(Peru) Christian Ramos	(yellow card) in Group B vs Brazil (matchday 2; 17 June); (yellow card) in Group B vs Ecuador (matchday 4; 23 June)	Group B vs Venezuela (matchday 5; 27 June)
(Colombia) Juan Cuadrado	(yellow card) in Group B vs Venezuela (matchday 2; 17 June); (yellow card) in Group B vs Brazil (matchday 4; 23 June)	Quarter-finals vs Uruguay (3 July)
(Paraguay) Gustavo Gómez	(yellow card) (yellow-red card) in Quarter-finals vs Peru (2 July)	Suspension served outside the tournament
(Peru) André Carrillo	(yellow card) (yellow-red card) in Quarter-finals vs Paraguay (2 July)	Semi-finals vs Brazil (5 July)
(Brazil) Gabriel Jesus	(red card) in Quarter-finals vs Chile (2 July)	Semi-finals vs Peru (5 July); Final vs Argentina (10 July)
(Ecuador) Piero Hincapié	(red card) in Quarter-finals vs Argentina (3 July)	Suspension served outside the tournament

=== Awards ===
The following awards were given at the conclusion of the tournament.

- Best Player Award: (Argentina) Lionel Messi
- Golden Boot Award: (Argentina) Lionel Messi
- Best Goalkeeper Award: (Argentina) Emiliano Martínez
- Fair Play Award: Brazil

=== Team of the Tournament ===
The Team of the Tournament was selected at the conclusion of the competition.

Goalkeeper	Defenders	Midfielders	Forwards
(Argentina) Emiliano Martínez	(Chile) Mauricio Isla (Argentina) Cristian Romero (Brazil) Marquinhos (Ecuador) Pervis Estupiñán	(Argentina) Rodrigo De Paul (Brazil) Casemiro (Peru) Yoshimar Yotún	(Argentina) Lionel Messi (Brazil) Neymar (Colombia) Luis Díaz

== Marketing ==
=== Mascot ===
Pibe, a brown dog, was selected as the official mascot for the tournament, making it the 14th officially selected mascot in Copa América history.

=== Official song ===
A customized version of "La Gozadera" by Cuban duo Gente de Zona was revealed as the official song of the tournament, ahead of its official reveal on 11 May.

== Broadcasting rights ==
=== CONMEBOL ===
Broadcasting rights for South America.

Territory	Broadcaster(s)	Ref.
Argentina	TVP; TyC Sports; Vrio Corp.	
Bolivia	Tigo Sports; Unitel	
Brazil	ESPN; Fox Sports; SBT	
Chile	Canal 13; TNT Sports; Vrio Corp.	
Colombia	Caracol Televisión; RCN Televisión; Vrio Corp.; Win Sports	
Ecuador	TC Televisión; Vrio Corp.	
Paraguay	SNT; Telefuturo; Tigo Sports; Trece; Vrio Corp.	
Peru	América Televisión; Vrio Corp.	
Uruguay	Vrio Corp.; Canal 4; Canal 10; Teledoce; Dexary	
Venezuela	La TeleTuya; VC Sports	

=== Rest of world ===
Territory	Broadcaster(s)	Ref.
Albania	DigitAlb	
Australia	Optus Sport	
Balkans	Arena Sport	
Bangladesh	T Sports HD	
Canada	RDS; TSN; Univision	
Caribbean	Fox Sports; SportsMax	
Central America	Tigo Sports	
China	CCTV; Huya Live; Kuaishou; PPTV	
Cuba	Tele Rebelde	
Costa Rica	Repretel; Teletica; Tigo Sports	
Cyprus	PrimeTel	
Czech Republic	Digi Sport	
Dominican Republic	CDN 37	
El Salvador	TCS	
France	L'Équipe	
Georgia	Adjarasport	
Germany	OneFootball; Sportdigital	
Greece	Open TV	
Haiti	TNH	
Honduras	Canal 11; Todo Deportes TV	
Hong Kong	i-Cable	
Hungary	ARENA4	
Indonesia	Indosiar; Vidio; Nex Parabola	
Italy	Eleven Sports; Sky Italia	
Indian subcontinent	Sony Pictures Networks	
Israel	Charlton	
Japan	AbemaTV	
Kazakhstan	Qazsport	
Maldives	ICE TV; Public Service Media	
MENA	beIN Sports	
Mexico	Fanatiz; Sky	
Nepal	DishHome	
Netherlands	Ziggo Sport	
New Zealand	Spark	
Nordic countries	NENT	
Panama	RPC; TVMax	
Poland	TVP	
Portugal	Sport TV	
Russia	Okko Sport; Telesport	
Singapore	StarHub	
Slovakia	Digi Sport	
South Korea	SPOTV	
Spain	Kosmos; CRTVG (Galicia); TV3 (Catalan)	
Sri Lanka	Dialog TV	
Sub-Saharan Africa	Canal+	
Suriname	SCCN	
Tajikistan	TV Varzish	
Thailand	PPTV	
Turkey	Haber Global	
Ukraine	MEGOGO	
United Kingdom	BBC	
United States	Fox Sports (English); Univision (Spanish)	
Vietnam	Next Media (VTVCab and Ho Chi Minh City Television)	
