= 2021 Copa América Group A =

Football tournament group stage

Group A of the 2021 Copa América, also referred to as the South Zone, took place from 14 to 28 June 2021 in Brazil. The group consisted of former co-hosts Argentina, Bolivia, Uruguay, Chile and Paraguay. It would also have included guests Australia before their withdrawal on 23 February 2021.

Originally, Group A was scheduled to be played from 12 to 30 June 2020. However, on 17 March 2020 the tournament was postponed to 2021 due to the COVID-19 pandemic in South America.

On 30 May 2021, Argentina was removed as co-host due to the COVID-19 pandemic.

== Teams ==
Draw position	Team	Appearance	Previous best performance	FIFA Rankings May 2021
A1	Argentina	43rd	Winners (1921, 1925, 1927, 1929, 1937, 1941, 1945, 1946, 1947, 1955, 1957, 1959 (A), 1991, 1993)	8
A2	Bolivia	28th	Winners (1963)	81
A3	Uruguay	45th	Winners (1916, 1917, 1920, 1923, 1924, 1926, 1935, 1942, 1956, 1959 (E), 1967, 1983, 1987, 1995, 2011)	9
A4	Chile	40th	Winners (2015, 2016)	19
A5	Paraguay	38th	Winners (1953, 1979)	35

== Standings ==
Pos	Team	Pld	W	D	L	GF	GA	GD	Pts	Qualification
1	Argentina	4	3	1	0	7	2	+5	10	Advance to knockout stage
2	Uruguay	4	2	1	1	4	2	+2	7	Advance to knockout stage
3	Paraguay	4	2	0	2	5	3	+2	6	Advance to knockout stage
4	Chile	4	1	2	1	3	4	−1	5	Advance to knockout stage
5	Bolivia	4	0	0	4	2	10	−8	0	

Source: CONMEBOL
Rules for classification: Tiebreakers

In the quarter-finals:

- The winners of Group A, Argentina, advanced to play the fourth-placed team of Group B, Ecuador.
- The runners-up of Group A, Uruguay, advanced to play the third-placed team of Group B, Colombia.
- The third-placed team of Group A, Paraguay, advanced to play the runners-up of Group B, Peru.
- The fourth-placed team of Group A, Chile, advanced to play the winners of Group B, Brazil.

== Matches ==
The original 2020 schedule and kick-off times were announced on 3 December 2019 and 4 March 2020 respectively. The new 2021 schedule was announced on 13 August 2020. Following the withdrawal of Australia, the shortened schedule was announced on 15 March 2021. The final match schedule with Brazil as host country was announced on 2 June 2021.

=== Matchday 1 ===
==== Argentina vs Chile ====
14 June 2021
18:00 BRT (UTC−3)

Argentina	1–1	Chile
Messi 33'	Report	Vargas 57'

Estádio Olímpico Nilton Santos, Rio de Janeiro
Attendance: 0 (Note: Due to the COVID-19 pandemic in South America, the match was played behind closed doors.)
Referee: Wilmar Roldán (Colombia)

Argentina	Chile

GK	23	Emiliano Martínez
RB	4	Gonzalo Montiel		(substituted off) 85'
CB	2	Lucas Martínez Quarta	(yellow card) 30'
CB	19	Nicolás Otamendi
LB	3	Nicolás Tagliafico
CM	7	Rodrigo De Paul
CM	5	Leandro Paredes		(substituted off) 68'
CM	20	Giovani Lo Celso		(substituted off) 67'
RF	10	Lionel Messi (c)
CF	22	Lautaro Martínez	(yellow card) 62'	(substituted off) 80'
LF	15	Nicolás González		(substituted off) 80'
Substitutions:
MF	11	Ángel Di María		(substituted on) 67'
MF	14	Exequiel Palacios		(substituted on) 68'
FW	9	Sergio Agüero		(substituted on) 80'
FW	16	Joaquín Correa		(substituted on) 80'
DF	26	Nahuel Molina		(substituted on) 85'
Manager:
Lionel Scaloni

GK	1	Claudio Bravo (c)
RB	4	Mauricio Isla	(yellow card) 25'
CB	17	Gary Medel		(substituted off) 84'
CB	3	Guillermo Maripán
LB	2	Eugenio Mena
CM	8	Arturo Vidal	(yellow card) 35'	(substituted off) 85'
CM	13	Erick Pulgar	(yellow card) 32'
CM	20	Charles Aránguiz
RF	21	Carlos Palacios		(substituted off) 77'
CF	11	Eduardo Vargas		(substituted off) 77'
LF	9	Jean Meneses		(substituted off) 90+3'
Substitutions:
MF	7	César Pinares		(substituted on) 77'
FW	22	Ben Brereton		(substituted on) 77'
DF	5	Enzo Roco		(substituted on) 84'
MF	19	Tomás Alarcón		(substituted on) 85'
MF	14	Pablo Galdames		(substituted on) 90+3'
Manager:
(Uruguay) Martín Lasarte

Man of the Match:
Lionel Messi (Argentina)

Assistant referees:
Alexander Guzmán (Colombia)
Jhon Alexander León (Colombia)
Fourth official:
Alexis Herrera (Venezuela)
Video assistant referee:
Jhon Ospina (Colombia)
Assistant video assistant referee:
Christian Lescano (Ecuador)

==== Paraguay vs Bolivia ====
14 June 2021
21:00 BRT (UTC−3)

Paraguay	3–1	Bolivia
Kaku 62'; Á. Romero 65', 80'	Report	Saavedra 10' (pen.)

Estádio Olímpico Pedro Ludovico, Goiânia
Attendance: 0
Referee: Diego Haro (Peru)

Paraguay	Bolivia

GK	1	Antony Silva
RB	13	Alberto Espínola	(yellow card) 45+11'
CB	15	Gustavo Gómez (c)
CB	6	Júnior Alonso
LB	19	Santiago Arzamendia	(yellow card) 8'	(substituted off) 74'
CM	23	Mathías Villasanti		(substituted off) 46'
CM	26	Robert Piris Da Motta		(substituted off) 58'
RW	17	Kaku		(substituted off) 87'
AM	10	Miguel Almirón
LW	11	Ángel Romero
CF	9	Gabriel Ávalos		(substituted off) 87'
Substitutions:
MF	8	Richard Sánchez		(substituted on) 46'
FW	7	Carlos González		(substituted on) 58'
DF	24	David Martínez		(substituted on) 74'
MF	14	Andrés Cubas		(substituted on) 87'
FW	28	Julio Enciso		(substituted on) 87'
Manager:
(Argentina) Eduardo Berizzo

GK	12	Rubén Cordano
CB	2	Jairo Quinteros
CB	5	Adrián Jusino
CB	3	José Sagredo
RM	8	Diego Bejarano	(yellow card) 29'
CM	16	Erwin Saavedra		(substituted off) 64'
CM	6	Leonel Justiniano (c)		(substituted off) 75'
CM	15	Boris Céspedes		(substituted off) 46'
LM	19	Enrique Flores	(yellow card) 40'	(substituted off) 46'
CF	18	Gilbert Álvarez		(substituted off) 69'
CF	24	Jaume Cuéllar	(yellow card) 38' (yellow-red card) 45+9'
Substitutions:
MF	17	Roberto Fernández		(substituted on) 46'
MF	22	Danny Bejarano		(substituted on) 46'
MF	13	Diego Wayar		(substituted on) 64'
FW	11	Rodrigo Ramallo		(substituted on) 69'
MF	21	Erwin Junior Sánchez		(substituted on) 75'
Manager:
(Venezuela) César Farías

Man of the Match:
Kaku (Paraguay)

Assistant referees:
Jonny Bossio (Peru)
Raúl López Cruz (Peru)
Fourth official:
Guillermo Guerrero (Ecuador)
Video assistant referee:
Wagner Reway (Brazil)
Assistant video assistant referee:
Víctor Hugo Carrillo (Peru)

=== Matchday 2 ===
==== Chile vs Bolivia ====
18 June 2021
17:00 AMT (UTC−4)

Chile	1–0	Bolivia
Brereton 10'	Report

Arena Pantanal, Cuiabá
Attendance: 0
Referee: Jesús Gil Manzano (Spain)

Chile	Bolivia

GK	1	Claudio Bravo (c)
RB	4	Mauricio Isla
CB	17	Gary Medel
CB	3	Guillermo Maripán	(yellow card) 81'
LB	2	Eugenio Mena
CM	8	Arturo Vidal		(substituted off) 69'
CM	13	Erick Pulgar
CM	20	Charles Aránguiz
RF	9	Jean Meneses		(substituted off) 65'
CF	11	Eduardo Vargas
LF	22	Ben Brereton		(substituted off) 84'
Substitutions:
MF	7	César Pinares		(substituted on) 65'
MF	19	Tomás Alarcón		(substituted on) 69'
MF	27	Pablo Aránguiz		(substituted on) 84'
Manager:
(Uruguay) Martín Lasarte

GK	1	Carlos Lampe
RB	8	Diego Bejarano	(yellow card) 87'
CB	2	Jairo Quinteros
CB	5	Adrián Jusino
LB	17	Roberto Fernández
RM	16	Erwin Saavedra		(substituted off) 78'
CM	6	Leonel Justiniano		(substituted off) 90'
CM	20	Ramiro Vaca	(yellow card) 53'	(substituted off) 90'
LM	7	Juan Carlos Arce (c)
CF	25	Jeyson Chura		(substituted off) 64'
CF	18	Gilbert Álvarez
Substitutions:
FW	11	Rodrigo Ramallo		(substituted on) 64'
DF	19	Enrique Flores		(substituted on) 78'
MF	14	Moisés Villarroel		(substituted on) 90'
MF	22	Danny Bejarano		(substituted on) 90'
Manager:
(Venezuela) César Farías

Man of the Match:
Eduardo Vargas (Chile)

Assistant referees:
Diego Barbero Sevilla (Spain)
Ángel Nevado Rodríguez (Spain)
Fourth official:
Andrés Rojas (Colombia)
Video assistant referee:
Ricardo de Burgos Bengoetxea (Spain)
Assistant video assistant referee:
José Luis Munuera Montero (Spain)

==== Argentina vs Uruguay ====
18 June 2021
21:00 BRT (UTC−3)

Argentina	1–0	Uruguay
Rodríguez 13'	Report

Estádio Nacional Mané Garrincha, Brasília
Attendance: 0
Referee: Wilton Sampaio (Brazil)

Argentina	Uruguay

GK	23	Emiliano Martínez	(yellow card) 75'
RB	26	Nahuel Molina
CB	13	Cristian Romero
CB	19	Nicolás Otamendi
LB	8	Marcos Acuña
CM	7	Rodrigo De Paul		(substituted off) 90+3'
CM	18	Guido Rodríguez
CM	20	Giovani Lo Celso	(yellow card) 48'	(substituted off) 52'
RF	10	Lionel Messi (c)
CF	22	Lautaro Martínez		(substituted off) 52'
LF	15	Nicolás González		(substituted off) 70'
Substitutions:
MF	14	Exequiel Palacios		(substituted on) 52'
FW	16	Joaquín Correa	(yellow card) 90+1'	(substituted on) 52'
MF	11	Ángel Di María		(substituted on) 70'
DF	6	Germán Pezzella		(substituted on) 90+3'
Manager:
Lionel Scaloni

GK	1	Fernando Muslera
RB	13	Giovanni González		(substituted off) 70'
CB	2	José María Giménez
CB	3	Diego Godín (c)
LB	17	Matías Viña
RM	15	Federico Valverde		(substituted off) 84'
CM	6	Rodrigo Bentancur		(substituted off) 46'
CM	14	Lucas Torreira	(yellow card) 62'	(substituted off) 64'
LM	7	Nicolás De La Cruz		(substituted off) 65'
CF	9	Luis Suárez
CF	21	Edinson Cavani
Substitutions:
MF	8	Nahitan Nández		(substituted on) 46'
MF	5	Matías Vecino		(substituted on) 64'
FW	26	Brian Ocampo	(yellow card) 90'	(substituted on) 65'
FW	25	Facundo Torres		(substituted on) 70'
MF	24	Fernando Gorriarán		(substituted on) 84'
Manager:
Óscar Tabárez

Man of the Match:
Lionel Messi (Argentina)

Assistant referees:
Danilo Manis (Brazil)
Bruno Pires (Brazil)
Fourth official:
Juan Soto (Venezuela)
Video assistant referee:
Wagner Reway (Brazil)
Assistant video assistant referee:
Rafael Traci (Brazil)

=== Matchday 3 ===
==== Uruguay vs Chile ====
21 June 2021
17:00 AMT (UTC−4)

Uruguay	1–1	Chile
Suárez 66'	Report	Vargas 26'

Arena Pantanal, Cuiabá
Attendance: 0
Referee: Raphael Claus (Brazil)

Uruguay	Chile

GK	1	Fernando Muslera
RB	13	Giovanni González		(substituted off) 46'
CB	2	José María Giménez
CB	3	Diego Godín (c)
LB	17	Matías Viña		(substituted off) 85'
DM	5	Matías Vecino		(substituted off) 81'
RM	15	Federico Valverde	(yellow card) 13'
LM	7	Nicolás De La Cruz		(substituted off) 46'
AM	10	Giorgian De Arrascaeta		(substituted off) 60'
CF	9	Luis Suárez
CF	21	Edinson Cavani
Substitutions:
DF	22	Martín Cáceres		(substituted on) 46'
MF	8	Nahitan Nández		(substituted on) 46'
FW	25	Facundo Torres		(substituted on) 60'
MF	14	Lucas Torreira		(substituted on) 81'
FW	20	Jonathan Rodríguez		(substituted on) 85'
Manager:
Óscar Tabárez

GK	1	Claudio Bravo (c)
CB	6	Francisco Sierralta	(yellow card) 19'
CB	17	Gary Medel
CB	3	Guillermo Maripán		(substituted off) 38'
CM	13	Erick Pulgar
CM	20	Charles Aránguiz
RW	4	Mauricio Isla
LW	2	Eugenio Mena
AM	8	Arturo Vidal		(substituted off) 69'
CF	11	Eduardo Vargas		(substituted off) 56'
CF	22	Ben Brereton		(substituted off) 69'
Substitutions:
DF	5	Enzo Roco		(substituted on) 38'
FW	9	Jean Meneses		(substituted on) 56'
MF	19	Tomás Alarcón		(substituted on) 69'
FW	24	Luciano Arriagada		(substituted on) 69'
Manager:
(Uruguay) Martín Lasarte

Man of the Match:
Charles Aránguiz (Chile)

Assistant referees:
Christian Lescano (Ecuador)
Byron Romero (Ecuador)
Fourth official:
Guillermo Guerrero (Ecuador)
Video assistant referee:
Rafael Traci (Brazil)
Assistant video assistant referee:
Víctor Hugo Carrillo (Peru)

==== Argentina vs Paraguay ====
21 June 2021
21:00 BRT (UTC−3)

Argentina	1–0	Paraguay
Gómez 10'	Report

Estádio Nacional Mané Garrincha, Brasília
Attendance: 0
Referee: Jesús Valenzuela (Venezuela)

Argentina	Paraguay

GK	23	Emiliano Martínez
RB	26	Nahuel Molina
CB	13	Cristian Romero
CB	6	Germán Pezzella
LB	3	Nicolás Tagliafico
CM	18	Guido Rodríguez
CM	5	Leandro Paredes	(yellow card) 34'	(substituted off) 81'
RW	11	Ángel Di María		(substituted off) 81'
AM	10	Lionel Messi (c)
LW	24	Alejandro Gómez		(substituted off) 72'
CF	9	Sergio Agüero		(substituted off) 59'
Substitutions:
FW	16	Joaquín Correa		(substituted on) 59'
MF	7	Rodrigo De Paul		(substituted on) 72'
MF	17	Nicolás Domínguez		(substituted on) 81'
MF	21	Ángel Correa		(substituted on) 81'
Manager:
Lionel Scaloni

GK	1	Antony Silva
RB	13	Alberto Espínola
CB	15	Gustavo Gómez (c)	(yellow card) 16'
CB	6	Júnior Alonso
LB	19	Santiago Arzamendia
CM	14	Andrés Cubas		(substituted off) 66'
CM	26	Robert Piris Da Motta		(substituted off) 82'
RW	11	Ángel Romero		(substituted off) 87'
AM	17	Kaku		(substituted off) 66'
LW	10	Miguel Almirón
CF	9	Gabriel Ávalos		(substituted off) 87'
Substitutions:
MF	16	Ángel Cardozo Lucena	(yellow card) 78'	(substituted on) 66'
MF	21	Óscar Romero		(substituted on) 66'
MF	8	Richard Sánchez		(substituted on) 82'
FW	7	Carlos González		(substituted on) 87'
FW	18	Braian Samudio		(substituted on) 87'
Manager:
(Argentina) Eduardo Berizzo

Man of the Match:
Ángel Di María (Argentina)

Assistant referees:
Carlos López (Venezuela)
Jorge Urrego (Venezuela)
Fourth official:
Alexis Herrera (Venezuela)
Video assistant referee:
Jhon Ospina (Colombia)
Assistant video assistant referee:
Alexander Guzmán (Colombia)

=== Matchday 4 ===
==== Bolivia vs Uruguay ====
24 June 2021
17:00 AMT (UTC−4)

Bolivia	0–2	Uruguay
	Report	Quinteros 40' (o.g.); Cavani 79'

Arena Pantanal, Cuiabá
Attendance: 0
Referee: Alexis Herrera (Venezuela)

Bolivia	Uruguay

GK	1	Carlos Lampe
RB	16	Erwin Saavedra
CB	2	Jairo Quinteros
CB	5	Adrián Jusino
LB	17	Roberto Fernández		(substituted off) 74'
DM	6	Leonel Justiniano
CM	20	Ramiro Vaca
CM	14	Moisés Villarroel		(substituted off) 46'
RW	25	Jeyson Chura	(yellow card) 16'	(substituted off) 46'
LW	7	Juan Carlos Arce (c)		(substituted off) 68'
CF	11	Rodrigo Ramallo		(substituted off) 61'
Substitutions:
MF	10	Henry Vaca	(yellow card) 47'	(substituted on) 46'
MF	22	Danny Bejarano		(substituted on) 46'
FW	9	Marcelo Moreno		(substituted on) 61'
MF	21	Erwin Junior Sánchez	(yellow card) 81'	(substituted on) 68'
DF	19	Enrique Flores		(substituted on) 74'
Manager:
(Venezuela) César Farías

GK	1	Fernando Muslera
RB	8	Nahitan Nández	(substituted off) 88'
CB	2	José María Giménez
CB	3	Diego Godín (c)
LB	17	Matías Viña
DM	5	Matías Vecino
RM	15	Federico Valverde
LM	7	Nicolás De La Cruz	(substituted off) 61'
AM	10	Giorgian De Arrascaeta	(substituted off) 73'
CF	9	Luis Suárez	(substituted off) 88'
CF	21	Edinson Cavani
Substitutions:
MF	6	Rodrigo Bentancur	(substituted on) 61'
FW	25	Facundo Torres	(substituted on) 73'
DF	13	Giovanni González	(substituted on) 88'
FW	18	Maximiliano Gómez	(substituted on) 88'
Manager:
Óscar Tabárez

Man of the Match:
Nahitan Nández (Uruguay)

Assistant referees:
Carlos López (Venezuela)
Jorge Urrego (Venezuela)
Fourth official:
Jesús Valenzuela (Venezuela)
Video assistant referee:
Wagner Reway (Brazil)
Assistant video assistant referee:
Juan Soto (Venezuela)

==== Chile vs Paraguay ====
24 June 2021
21:00 BRT (UTC−3)

Chile	0–2	Paraguay
	Report	Samudio 33'; Almirón 58' (pen.)

Estádio Nacional Mané Garrincha, Brasília
Attendance: 0
Referee: Wilmar Roldán (Colombia)

Chile	Paraguay

GK	1	Claudio Bravo (c)	(yellow card) 58'
RB	4	Mauricio Isla
CB	17	Gary Medel	(yellow card) 56'	(substituted off) 68'
CB	6	Francisco Sierralta
LB	2	Eugenio Mena
CM	8	Arturo Vidal
CM	19	Tomás Alarcón		(substituted off) 46'
CM	20	Charles Aránguiz
RF	7	César Pinares		(substituted off) 68'
CF	11	Eduardo Vargas
LF	22	Ben Brereton	(yellow card) 45+1'
Substitutions:
FW	9	Jean Meneses		(substituted on) 46'
DF	5	Enzo Roco		(substituted on) 68'
MF	14	Pablo Galdames		(substituted on) 68'
Manager:
(Uruguay) Martín Lasarte

GK	1	Antony Silva
RB	13	Alberto Espínola
CB	15	Gustavo Gómez (c)
CB	6	Júnior Alonso
LB	24	David Martínez	(yellow card) 78'
RM	18	Braian Samudio		(substituted off) 62'
CM	23	Mathías Villasanti
CM	16	Ángel Cardozo Lucena		(substituted off) 84'
LM	19	Santiago Arzamendia		(substituted off) 84'
CF	10	Miguel Almirón		(substituted off) 77'
CF	7	Carlos González		(substituted off) 77'
Substitutions:
FW	11	Ángel Romero		(substituted on) 62'
MF	21	Óscar Romero		(substituted on) 77'
FW	20	Antonio Bareiro		(substituted on) 77'
DF	3	Omar Alderete		(substituted on) 84'
MF	5	Gastón Giménez		(substituted on) 84'
Manager:
(Argentina) Eduardo Berizzo

Man of the Match:
Miguel Almirón (Paraguay)

Assistant referees:
Alexander Guzmán (Colombia)
Jhon Alexander León (Colombia)
Fourth official:
Andrés Rojas (Colombia)
Video assistant referee:
Rafael Traci (Brazil)
Assistant video assistant referee:
Jhon Ospina (Colombia)

=== Matchday 5 ===
==== Uruguay vs Paraguay ====
28 June 2021
21:00 BRT (UTC−3)

Uruguay	1–0	Paraguay
Cavani 21' (pen.)	Report

Estádio Olímpico Nilton Santos, Rio de Janeiro
Attendance: 0
Referee: Raphael Claus (Brazil)

Uruguay	Paraguay

GK	1	Fernando Muslera
RB	8	Nahitan Nández
CB	2	José María Giménez
CB	3	Diego Godín (c)	(substituted off) 46'
LB	17	Matías Viña
RM	15	Federico Valverde	(substituted off) 76'
CM	5	Matías Vecino	(substituted off) 57'
LM	6	Rodrigo Bentancur
AM	10	Giorgian De Arrascaeta	(substituted off) 67'
AM	7	Nicolás De La Cruz
CF	21	Edinson Cavani	(substituted off) 68'
Substitutions:
DF	19	Sebastián Coates	(substituted on) 46'
DF	22	Martín Cáceres	(substituted on) 57'
FW	25	Facundo Torres	(substituted on) 67'
FW	9	Luis Suárez	(substituted on) 68'
MF	14	Lucas Torreira	(substituted on) 76'
Manager:
Óscar Tabárez

GK	1	Antony Silva
RB	13	Alberto Espínola		(substituted off) 57'
CB	2	Robert Rojas
CB	6	Júnior Alonso (c)	(yellow card) 81'
LB	3	Omar Alderete	(yellow card) 43'
RM	18	Braian Samudio		(substituted off) 73'
CM	5	Gastón Giménez		(substituted off) 74'
CM	23	Mathías Villasanti
LM	11	Ángel Romero
CF	10	Miguel Almirón		(substituted off) 33'
CF	9	Gabriel Ávalos		(substituted off) 57'
Substitutions:
MF	21	Óscar Romero		(substituted on) 33'
DF	24	David Martínez		(substituted on) 57'
FW	7	Carlos González		(substituted on) 57'
MF	14	Andrés Cubas		(substituted on) 73'
MF	8	Richard Sánchez		(substituted on) 74'
Manager:
(Argentina) Eduardo Berizzo

Man of the Match:
Rodrigo Bentancur (Uruguay)

Assistant referees:
Danilo Manis (Brazil)
Bruno Pires (Brazil)
Fourth official:
Guillermo Guerrero (Ecuador)
Video assistant referee:
Wagner Reway (Brazil)
Assistant video assistant referee:
Christian Lescano (Ecuador)

==== Bolivia vs Argentina ====
28 June 2021
20:00 AMT (UTC−4)

Bolivia	1–4	Argentina
Saavedra 60'	Report	Gómez 6'; Messi 33' (pen.), 42'; La. Martínez 65'

Arena Pantanal, Cuiabá
Attendance: 0
Referee: Andrés Rojas (Colombia)

Bolivia	Argentina

GK	1	Carlos Lampe
RB	8	Diego Bejarano
CB	4	Luis Haquin
CB	5	Adrián Jusino
LB	17	Roberto Fernández		(substituted off) 81'
RM	16	Erwin Saavedra		(substituted off) 85'
CM	6	Leonel Justiniano (c)
CM	15	Boris Céspedes		(substituted off) 61'
LM	20	Ramiro Vaca
CF	18	Gilbert Álvarez		(substituted off) 61'
CF	25	Jeyson Chura		(substituted off) 61'
Substitutions:
DF	3	José Sagredo		(substituted on) 61'
FW	10	Henry Vaca		(substituted on) 61'
FW	11	Rodrigo Ramallo	(yellow card) 86'	(substituted on) 61'
MF	13	Diego Wayar	(yellow card) 90+2'	(substituted on) 81'
MF	14	Moisés Villarroel		(substituted on) 85'
Manager:
(Venezuela) César Farías

GK	1	Franco Armani
RB	4	Gonzalo Montiel
CB	6	Germán Pezzella
CB	25	Lisandro Martínez
LB	8	Marcos Acuña	(yellow card) 90'
CM	14	Exequiel Palacios		(substituted off) 71'
CM	18	Guido Rodríguez		(substituted off) 71'
RW	21	Ángel Correa		(substituted off) 64'
AM	10	Lionel Messi (c)
LW	24	Alejandro Gómez		(substituted off) 56'
CF	9	Sergio Agüero		(substituted off) 63'
Substitutions:
FW	27	Julián Alvarez		(substituted on) 56'
FW	22	Lautaro Martínez		(substituted on) 63'
MF	20	Giovani Lo Celso		(substituted on) 64'
MF	5	Leandro Paredes		(substituted on) 71'
MF	17	Nicolás Domínguez		(substituted on) 71'
Manager:
Lionel Scaloni

Man of the Match:
Lionel Messi (Argentina)

Assistant referees:
Jhon Alexander León (Colombia)
Jonny Bossio (Peru)
Fourth official:
Diego Haro (Peru)
Video assistant referee:
Ricardo de Burgos Bengoetxea (Spain)
Assistant video assistant referee:
Alexander Guzmán (Colombia)

== Discipline ==
Fair play points were to be used as a tiebreaker if the overall and head-to-head records of teams were tied. These were calculated based on yellow and red cards received in all group matches as follows (Regulations Article 10):

- first yellow card: minus 1 point;
- indirect red card (second yellow card): minus 3 points;
- direct red card: minus 4 points;
- yellow card and direct red card: minus 5 points;

Only one of the above deductions was applied to a player in a single match.

Team	Matchday 1				Matchday 2				Matchday 3				Matchday 4				Matchday 5				Points
Team	Booked	(yellow card) (yellow-red card)	Sent off (straight red)	(yellow card) (red card)	Booked	(yellow card) (yellow-red card)	Sent off (straight red)	(yellow card) (red card)	Booked	(yellow card) (yellow-red card)	Sent off (straight red)	(yellow card) (red card)	Booked	(yellow card) (yellow-red card)	Sent off (straight red)	(yellow card) (red card)	Booked	(yellow card) (yellow-red card)	Sent off (straight red)	(yellow card) (red card)	Points
Argentina	2	0	0	0	3	0	0	0	1	0	0	0					1	0	0	0	–7
Bolivia	2	1	0	0	2	0	0	0					3	0	0	0	2	0	0	0	–12
Uruguay					2	0	0	0	1	0	0	0	0	0	0	0	0	0	0	0	–3
Chile	3	0	0	0	1	0	0	0	1	0	0	0	3	0	0	0					–8
Paraguay	2	0	0	0					2	0	0	0	1	0	0	0	2	0	0	0	–7
