= 2021 Copa América knockout stage =

The knockout stage of the 2021 Copa América began on 2 July 2021 with the quarter-finals and ended on 10 July 2021 with the final at the Estádio do Maracanã in Rio de Janeiro.

Originally, the knockout stage was scheduled to be played from 4 to 12 July 2020. However, on 17 March 2020 the tournament was postponed until 2021 due to the COVID-19 pandemic in South America.

All match times listed are in BRT (UTC−3).

== Format ==
In the knockout stage, if a match was tied after 90 minutes:

- In the quarter-finals, semi-finals and third place play-off, extra time would not be played, and the match would be decided by a penalty shoot-out (Regulations Article 9.3).
- In the final, extra time would be played. If still tied after extra time, the match would be decided by a penalty shoot-out (Regulations Article 9.4).

== Qualified teams ==
The top four placed teams from each group qualified for the knockout stage.

| Group | Winners | Runners-up | Third place | Fourth place |
|---|---|---|---|---|
| A | Argentina | Uruguay | Paraguay | Chile |
| B | Brazil | Peru | Colombia | Ecuador |

== Bracket ==
Quarter-finals
3 July – Goiânia
Argentina | 3
Ecuador | 0
3 July – Brasília
Uruguay | 0 (2)
Colombia (p) | 0 (4)
2 July – Rio de Janeiro (O. Nilton Santos)
Brazil | 1
Chile | 0
2 July – Goiânia
Peru (p) | 3 (4)
Paraguay | 3 (3)

Semi-finals
6 July – Brasília
Argentina (p) | 1 (3)
Colombia | 1 (2)
5 July – Rio de Janeiro (O. Nilton Santos)
Brazil | 1
Peru | 0

Final
10 July – Rio de Janeiro (Maracanã)
Argentina | 1
Brazil | 0
Third place play-off
9 July – Brasília
Colombia | 3
Peru | 2

== Quarter-finals ==
=== Peru vs Paraguay ===
2 July 2021
18:00 BRT (UTC−3)

| Peru | 3–3 | Paraguay |
|---|---|---|
| Gómez 21' (o.g.); Lapadula 40'; Yotún 80' | Report | Gómez 11'; Alonso 54'; Ávalos 90' |
Penalties
| Lapadula (penalty scored); Yotún (penalty scored); Ormeño (penalty missed); Tapia (penalty scored); Cueva (penalty missed); Trauco (penalty scored) | 4–3 | (penalty scored) Á. Romero; (penalty scored) Alonso; (penalty missed) Martínez; (penalty missed) Samudio; (penalty scored) Piris Da Motta; (penalty missed) Espínola |

Estádio Olímpico Pedro Ludovico, Goiânia
Attendance: 0 (Note: Due to the COVID-19 pandemic in South America, the match was played behind closed doors.)
Referee: Esteban Ostojich (Uruguay)

| Peru | Paraguay |

| GK | 1 | Pedro Gallese (c) |
| RB | 3 | Aldo Corzo | | (substituted off) 90+2' |
| CB | 15 | Christian Ramos |
| CB | 4 | Anderson Santamaría | (yellow card) 15' |
| LB | 6 | Miguel Trauco |
| DM | 13 | Renato Tapia |
| RM | 18 | André Carrillo | (yellow card) 75' (yellow-red card) 85' |
| CM | 8 | Sergio Peña | | (substituted off) 60' |
| CM | 19 | Yoshimar Yotún |
| LM | 10 | Christian Cueva | (yellow card) 60' |
| CF | 9 | Gianluca Lapadula |
Substitutions:
| FW | 20 | Santiago Ormeño | | (substituted on) 60' |
| DF | 26 | Jhilmar Lora | | (substituted on) 90+2' |
Manager:
(Argentina) Ricardo Gareca

| GK | 1 | Antony Silva |
| RB | 13 | Alberto Espínola | (yellow card) 87' |
| CB | 15 | Gustavo Gómez (c) | (yellow card) 42' (yellow-red card) 45+3' |
| CB | 6 | Júnior Alonso |
| LB | 24 | David Martínez |
| RM | 11 | Ángel Romero |
| CM | 23 | Mathías Villasanti | (yellow card) 49' | (substituted off) 79' |
| CM | 16 | Ángel Cardozo Lucena | | (substituted off) 46' |
| LM | 19 | Santiago Arzamendia | | (substituted off) 83' |
| CF | 7 | Carlos González | | (substituted off) 68' |
| CF | 8 | Richard Sánchez | | (substituted off) 83' |
Substitutions:
| DF | 2 | Robert Rojas | | (substituted on) 46' |
| FW | 18 | Braian Samudio | | (substituted on) 68' |
| MF | 26 | Robert Piris Da Motta | | (substituted on) 79' |
| FW | 28 | Julio César Enciso | | (substituted on) 83' |
| FW | 9 | Gabriel Ávalos | | (substituted on) 83' |
Manager:
(Argentina) Eduardo Berizzo

Man of the Match:
Gianluca Lapadula (Peru)

Assistant referees:
Carlos Barreiro (Uruguay)
Martín Soppi (Uruguay)
Fourth official:
Gery Vargas (Bolivia)
Video assistant referee:
Mauro Vigliano (Argentina)
Assistant video assistant referees:
Facundo Tello (Argentina)
Alexander Guzmán (Colombia)

=== Brazil vs Chile ===
2 July 2021
21:00 BRT (UTC−3)

| Brazil | 1–0 | Chile |
|---|---|---|
| Paquetá 46' | Report |

Estádio Olímpico Nilton Santos, Rio de Janeiro
Attendance: 0
Referee: Patricio Loustau (Argentina)

| Brazil | Chile |

| GK | 23 | Ederson | (yellow card) 81' |
| RB | 2 | Danilo |
| CB | 4 | Marquinhos |
| CB | 3 | Thiago Silva (c) |
| LB | 16 | Renan Lodi | | (substituted off) 90+1' |
| CM | 5 | Casemiro |
| CM | 8 | Fred |
| RW | 9 | Gabriel Jesus | (red card) 48' |
| AM | 20 | Roberto Firmino | | (substituted off) 46' |
| LW | 7 | Richarlison | | (substituted off) 90+1' |
| CF | 10 | Neymar |
Substitutions:
| MF | 17 | Lucas Paquetá | | (substituted on) 46' |
| DF | 14 | Éder Militão | | (substituted on) 90+1' |
| FW | 19 | Everton | | (substituted on) 90+1' |
Manager:
Tite

| GK | 1 | Claudio Bravo (c) |
| CB | 6 | Francisco Sierralta | (yellow card) 58' |
| CB | 17 | Gary Medel |
| CB | 18 | Sebastián Vegas | | (substituted off) 64' |
| RWB | 4 | Mauricio Isla |
| LWB | 2 | Eugenio Mena |
| CM | 8 | Arturo Vidal | (yellow card) 88' |
| CM | 13 | Erick Pulgar | | (substituted off) 76' |
| CM | 20 | Charles Aránguiz | | (substituted off) 88' |
| CF | 11 | Eduardo Vargas |
| CF | 10 | Alexis Sánchez | | (substituted off) 46' |
Substitutions:
| FW | 22 | Ben Brereton | | (substituted on) 46' |
| FW | 21 | Carlos Palacios | (yellow card) 76' | (substituted on) 64' |
| FW | 9 | Jean Meneses | | (substituted on) 76' |
| FW | 3 | Diego Valencia | | (substituted on) 88' |
Manager:
(Uruguay) Martín Lasarte

Man of the Match:
Neymar (Brazil)

Assistant referees:
Ezequiel Brailovsky (Argentina)
Gabriel Chade (Argentina)
Fourth official:
Guillermo Guerrero (Ecuador)
Video assistant referee:
Andrés Cunha (Uruguay)
Assistant video assistant referees:
Daniel Fedorczuk (Uruguay)
Christian Lescano (Ecuador)

=== Uruguay vs Colombia ===
3 July 2021
19:00 BRT (UTC−3)

| Uruguay | 0–0 | Colombia |
|---|---|---|
| | Report |
Penalties
| Cavani (penalty scored); Giménez (penalty missed); Suárez (penalty scored); Viña (penalty missed) | 2–4 | (penalty scored) Zapata; (penalty scored) Sánchez; (penalty scored) Mina; (penalty scored) Borja |

Estádio Nacional Mané Garrincha, Brasília
Attendance: 0
Referee: Jesús Gil Manzano (Spain)

| Uruguay | Colombia |

| GK | 1 | Fernando Muslera |
| RB | 8 | Nahitan Nández |
| CB | 2 | José María Giménez |
| CB | 3 | Diego Godín (c) | (yellow card) 35' |
| LB | 17 | Matías Viña |
| DM | 5 | Matías Vecino |
| RM | 15 | Federico Valverde | | (substituted off) 80' |
| LM | 6 | Rodrigo Bentancur |
| AM | 10 | Giorgian De Arrascaeta | | (substituted off) 68' |
| CF | 9 | Luis Suárez |
| CF | 21 | Edinson Cavani |
Substitutions:
| FW | 25 | Facundo Torres | | (substituted on) 68' |
| DF | 22 | Martín Cáceres | | (substituted on) 80' |
Manager:
Óscar Tabárez

| GK | 1 | David Ospina (c) |
| RB | 16 | Daniel Muñoz |
| CB | 13 | Yerry Mina |
| CB | 23 | Davinson Sánchez |
| LB | 6 | William Tesillo |
| RM | 18 | Rafael Santos Borré | (substituted off) 87' |
| CM | 5 | Wílmar Barrios |
| CM | 8 | Gustavo Cuéllar |
| LM | 14 | Luis Díaz |
| CF | 9 | Luis Muriel | (substituted off) 67' |
| CF | 7 | Duván Zapata |
Substitutions:
| FW | 28 | Yimmi Chará | (substituted on) 67' |
| FW | 19 | Miguel Borja | (substituted on) 87' |
Manager:
Reinaldo Rueda

Man of the Match:
David Ospina (Colombia)

Assistant referees:
Diego Barbero Sevilla (Spain)
Ángel Nevado Rodríguez (Spain)
Fourth official:
Eber Aquino (Paraguay)
Video assistant referee:
Ricardo de Burgos Bengoetxea (Spain)
Assistant video assistant referees:
José Luis Munuera Montero (Spain)
Milciades Saldívar (Paraguay)

=== Argentina vs Ecuador ===
3 July 2021
22:00 BRT (UTC−3)

| Argentina | 3–0 | Ecuador |
|---|---|---|
| De Paul 40'; La. Martínez 84'; Messi 90+3' | Report |

Estádio Olímpico Pedro Ludovico, Goiânia
Attendance: 0
Referee: Wilton Sampaio (Brazil)

| Argentina | Ecuador |

| GK | 23 | Emiliano Martínez |
| RB | 26 | Nahuel Molina |
| CB | 6 | Germán Pezzella |
| CB | 19 | Nicolás Otamendi | (yellow card) 45+4' |
| LB | 8 | Marcos Acuña |
| CM | 7 | Rodrigo De Paul |
| CM | 5 | Leandro Paredes | | (substituted off) 71' |
| CM | 20 | Giovani Lo Celso | | (substituted off) 71' |
| RF | 10 | Lionel Messi (c) |
| CF | 22 | Lautaro Martínez | | (substituted off) 90+4' |
| LF | 15 | Nicolás González | (yellow card) 66' | (substituted off) 83' |
Substitutions:
| MF | 11 | Ángel Di María | | (substituted on) 71' |
| MF | 18 | Guido Rodríguez | | (substituted on) 71' |
| DF | 3 | Nicolás Tagliafico | | (substituted on) 83' |
| FW | 9 | Sergio Agüero | | (substituted on) 90+4' |
Manager:
Lionel Scaloni

| GK | 1 | Hernán Galíndez |
| RB | 17 | Ángelo Preciado | (yellow card) 20' | (substituted off) 83' |
| CB | 4 | Robert Arboleda |
| CB | 3 | Piero Hincapié | (red card) 90+2' |
| LB | 7 | Pervis Estupiñán | (yellow card) 44' |
| CM | 21 | Alan Franco | (yellow card) 31' | (substituted off) 70' |
| CM | 10 | Carlos Gruezo | | (substituted off) 46' |
| CM | 20 | Sebas Méndez |
| RW | 15 | Ángel Mena |
| LW | 27 | Diego Palacios | | (substituted off) 46' |
| CF | 13 | Enner Valencia (c) |
Substitutions:
| FW | 11 | Michael Estrada | | (substituted on) 46' |
| MF | 19 | Gonzalo Plata | | (substituted on) 46' |
| MF | 23 | Moisés Caicedo | | (substituted on) 70' |
| FW | 9 | Leonardo Campana | | (substituted on) 83' |
Manager:
(Argentina) Gustavo Alfaro

Man of the Match:
Lionel Messi (Argentina)

Assistant referees:
Danilo Manis (Brazil)
Bruno Pires (Brazil)
Fourth official:
Víctor Hugo Carrillo (Peru)
Video assistant referee:
Wagner Reway (Brazil)
Assistant video assistant referees:
Rafael Traci (Brazil)
Eduardo Cardozo (Paraguay)

== Semi-finals ==
=== Brazil vs Peru ===
5 July 2021
20:00 BRT (UTC−3)

| Brazil | 1–0 | Peru |
|---|---|---|
| Paquetá 35' | Report |

Estádio Olímpico Nilton Santos, Rio de Janeiro
Attendance: 0
Referee: Roberto Tobar (Chile)

| Brazil | Peru |

| GK | 23 | Ederson |
| RB | 2 | Danilo |
| CB | 4 | Marquinhos |
| CB | 3 | Thiago Silva (c) |
| LB | 16 | Renan Lodi | | (substituted off) 85' |
| CM | 5 | Casemiro |
| CM | 8 | Fred | | (substituted off) 85' |
| RW | 19 | Everton | | (substituted off) 70' |
| AM | 17 | Lucas Paquetá | | (substituted off) 90+2' |
| LW | 10 | Neymar |
| CF | 7 | Richarlison | | (substituted off) 85' |
Substitutions:
| MF | 11 | Éverton Ribeiro | | (substituted on) 70' |
| DF | 14 | Éder Militão | | (substituted on) 85' |
| MF | 15 | Fabinho | | (substituted on) 85' |
| FW | 18 | Vinícius Júnior | (yellow card) 89' | (substituted on) 85' |
| MF | 25 | Douglas Luiz | | (substituted on) 90+2' |
Manager:
Tite

| GK | 1 | Pedro Gallese (c) |
| CB | 4 | Anderson Santamaría |
| CB | 15 | Christian Ramos | | (substituted off) 46' |
| CB | 22 | Alexander Callens |
| RWB | 3 | Aldo Corzo | | (substituted off) 75' |
| LWB | 6 | Miguel Trauco | | (substituted off) 46' |
| RM | 8 | Sergio Peña |
| CM | 13 | Renato Tapia | | (substituted off) 89' |
| CM | 19 | Yoshimar Yotún | (yellow card) 56' |
| LM | 10 | Christian Cueva | | (substituted off) 81' |
| CF | 9 | Gianluca Lapadula |
Substitutions:
| DF | 16 | Marcos López | (yellow card) 90' | (substituted on) 46' |
| MF | 24 | Raziel García | | (substituted on) 46' |
| DF | 26 | Jhilmar Lora | | (substituted on) 75' |
| FW | 20 | Santiago Ormeño | | (substituted on) 81' |
| MF | 7 | Gerald Távara | | (substituted on) 89' |
Manager:
(Argentina) Ricardo Gareca

Man of the Match:
Neymar (Brazil)

Assistant referees:
Christian Schiemann (Chile)
Claudio Ríos (Chile)
Fourth official:
Alexis Herrera (Venezuela)
Fifth official:
Edwar Saavedra (Bolivia)
Video assistant referee:
Derlis López (Paraguay)
Assistant video assistant referees:
Eber Aquino (Paraguay)
Milciades Saldívar (Paraguay)

=== Argentina vs Colombia ===
6 July 2021
22:00 BRT (UTC−3)

| Argentina | 1–1 | Colombia |
|---|---|---|
| La. Martínez 7' | Report | Díaz 61' |
Penalties
| Messi (penalty scored); De Paul (penalty missed); Paredes (penalty scored); La. Martínez (penalty scored) | 3–2 | (penalty scored) Cuadrado; (penalty missed) Sánchez; (penalty missed) Mina; (penalty scored) Borja; (penalty missed) Cardona |

Estádio Nacional Mané Garrincha, Brasília
Attendance: 0
Referee: Jesús Valenzuela (Venezuela)

| Argentina | Colombia |

| GK | 23 | Emiliano Martínez |
| RB | 26 | Nahuel Molina | | (substituted off) 46' |
| CB | 6 | Germán Pezzella | (yellow card) 90+1' |
| CB | 19 | Nicolás Otamendi |
| LB | 3 | Nicolás Tagliafico |
| CM | 7 | Rodrigo De Paul |
| CM | 18 | Guido Rodríguez | (yellow card) 87' |
| CM | 20 | Giovani Lo Celso | (yellow card) 21' | (substituted off) 56' |
| RF | 10 | Lionel Messi (c) |
| CF | 22 | Lautaro Martínez |
| LF | 15 | Nicolás González | | (substituted off) 67' |
Substitutions:
| DF | 4 | Gonzalo Montiel | (yellow card) 72' | (substituted on) 46' |
| MF | 5 | Leandro Paredes | | (substituted on) 56' |
| MF | 11 | Ángel Di María | | (substituted on) 67' |
Manager:
Lionel Scaloni

| GK | 1 | David Ospina (c) |
| RB | 16 | Daniel Muñoz | (yellow card) 75' |
| CB | 13 | Yerry Mina |
| CB | 23 | Davinson Sánchez |
| LB | 6 | William Tesillo | | (substituted off) 46' |
| RM | 11 | Juan Cuadrado | (yellow card) 45+4' |
| CM | 5 | Wílmar Barrios | (yellow card) 88' |
| CM | 8 | Gustavo Cuéllar | | (substituted off) 46' |
| LM | 14 | Luis Díaz |
| CF | 18 | Rafael Santos Borré | | (substituted off) 46' |
| CF | 7 | Duván Zapata | | (substituted off) 60' |
Substitutions:
| DF | 26 | Frank Fabra | (yellow card) 55' | (substituted on) 46' |
| MF | 10 | Edwin Cardona | (yellow card) 86' | (substituted on) 46' |
| FW | 28 | Yimmi Chará | | (substituted on) 46' |
| FW | 19 | Miguel Borja | (yellow card) 63' | (substituted on) 60' |
Manager:
Reinaldo Rueda

Man of the Match:
Emiliano Martínez (Argentina)

Assistant referees:
Carlos López (Venezuela)
Jorge Urrego (Venezuela)
Fourth official:
Juan Soto (Venezuela)
Fifth official:
Byron Romero (Ecuador)
Video assistant referee:
Julio Bascuñán (Chile)
Assistant video assistant referees:
Cristián Garay (Chile)
Eduardo Cardozo (Paraguay)

== Third place play-off ==
9 July 2021
21:00 BRT (UTC−3)

| Colombia | 3–2 | Peru |
|---|---|---|
| Cuadrado 49'; Díaz 66', 90+4' | Report | Yotún 45'; Lapadula 82' |

Estádio Nacional Mané Garrincha, Brasília
Attendance: 0
Referee: Raphael Claus (Brazil)

| Colombia | Peru |

| GK | 12 | Camilo Vargas |
| RB | 2 | Stefan Medina |
| CB | 13 | Yerry Mina | | (substituted off) 55' |
| CB | 3 | Óscar Murillo | (yellow card) 87' |
| LB | 6 | William Tesillo |
| RM | 11 | Juan Cuadrado (c) |
| CM | 5 | Wílmar Barrios | (yellow card) 62' | (substituted off) 90+3' |
| CM | 8 | Gustavo Cuéllar | | (substituted off) 83' |
| LM | 14 | Luis Díaz |
| SS | 10 | Edwin Cardona | (yellow card) 45+5' | (substituted off) 46' |
| CF | 7 | Duván Zapata | | (substituted off) 55' |
Substitutions:
| FW | 28 | Yimmi Chará | | (substituted on) 46' |
| DF | 23 | Davinson Sánchez | | (substituted on) 55' |
| FW | 19 | Miguel Borja | | (substituted on) 55' |
| FW | 18 | Rafael Santos Borré | | (substituted on) 83' |
| FW | 9 | Luis Muriel | | (substituted on) 90+3' |
Manager:
Reinaldo Rueda

| GK | 1 | Pedro Gallese (c) |
| RB | 3 | Aldo Corzo | | (substituted off) 78' |
| CB | 4 | Anderson Santamaría |
| CB | 22 | Alexander Callens |
| LB | 16 | Marcos López |
| CM | 13 | Renato Tapia | | (substituted off) 24' |
| CM | 19 | Yoshimar Yotún |
| RW | 18 | André Carrillo | (yellow card) 63' |
| AM | 8 | Sergio Peña | | (substituted off) 78' |
| LW | 10 | Christian Cueva | (yellow card) 50' | (substituted off) 69' |
| CF | 9 | Gianluca Lapadula |
Substitutions:
| MF | 14 | Wilder Cartagena | | (substituted on) 24' |
| MF | 24 | Raziel García | | (substituted on) 69' |
| DF | 26 | Jhilmar Lora | | (substituted on) 78' |
| FW | 20 | Santiago Ormeño | | (substituted on) 78' |
Manager:
(Argentina) Ricardo Gareca

Man of the Match:
Luis Díaz (Colombia)

Assistant referees:
Bruno Pires (Brazil)
Danilo Manis (Brazil)
Fourth official:
Gery Vargas (Bolivia)
Video assistant referee:
Wagner Reway (Brazil)
Assistant video assistant referees:
Rafael Traci (Brazil)
Eduardo Cardozo (Paraguay)
Leodán González (Uruguay)

== Final ==
10 July 2021
21:00 BRT (UTC−3)

| Argentina | 1–0 | Brazil |
|---|---|---|
| Di María 22' | Report |

Estádio do Maracanã, Rio de Janeiro
Attendance: 7,800 (Note: The total capacity of the stadium to allow fans to attend the final was established at 10% due to the COVID-19 pandemic in South America.)
Referee: Esteban Ostojich (Uruguay)

| Argentina | Brazil |

| GK | 23 | Emiliano Martínez |
| RB | 4 | Gonzalo Montiel | (yellow card) 89' |
| CB | 13 | Cristian Romero | | (substituted off) 79' |
| CB | 19 | Nicolás Otamendi | (yellow card) 81' |
| LB | 8 | Marcos Acuña |
| CM | 7 | Rodrigo De Paul | (yellow card) 68' |
| CM | 5 | Leandro Paredes | (yellow card) 33' | (substituted off) 54' |
| CM | 20 | Giovani Lo Celso | (yellow card) 51' | (substituted off) 63' |
| RF | 10 | Lionel Messi (c) |
| CF | 22 | Lautaro Martínez | | (substituted off) 79' |
| LF | 11 | Ángel Di María | | (substituted off) 79' |
Substitutions:
| MF | 18 | Guido Rodríguez | | (substituted on) 54' |
| DF | 3 | Nicolás Tagliafico | | (substituted on) 63' |
| DF | 6 | Germán Pezzella | | (substituted on) 79' |
| FW | 15 | Nicolás González | | (substituted on) 79' |
| MF | 14 | Exequiel Palacios | | (substituted on) 79' |
Manager:
Lionel Scaloni

| GK | 23 | Ederson |
| RB | 2 | Danilo |
| CB | 4 | Marquinhos | (yellow card) 82' |
| CB | 3 | Thiago Silva (c) |
| LB | 16 | Renan Lodi | (yellow card) 70' | (substituted off) 76' |
| CM | 5 | Casemiro |
| CM | 8 | Fred | (yellow card) 3' | (substituted off) 46' |
| RW | 7 | Richarlison |
| AM | 17 | Lucas Paquetá | (yellow card) 72' | (substituted off) 76' |
| LW | 19 | Everton | | (substituted off) 63' |
| CF | 10 | Neymar |
Substitutions:
| FW | 20 | Roberto Firmino | | (substituted on) 46' |
| FW | 18 | Vinícius Júnior | | (substituted on) 63' |
| DF | 13 | Emerson Royal | | (substituted on) 76' |
| FW | 21 | Gabriel Barbosa | | (substituted on) 76' |
Manager:
Tite

Man of the Match:
Ángel Di María (Argentina)

Assistant referees:
Carlos Barreiro (Uruguay)
Martín Soppi (Uruguay)
Fourth official:
Diego Haro (Peru)
Fifth official:
José Antelo (Bolivia)
Video assistant referee:
Andrés Cunha (Uruguay)
Assistant video assistant referees:
Daniel Fedorczuk (Uruguay)
Alexander Guzmán (Colombia)
Jhon Ospina (Colombia)
