= 2021 Copa América final =

International football match

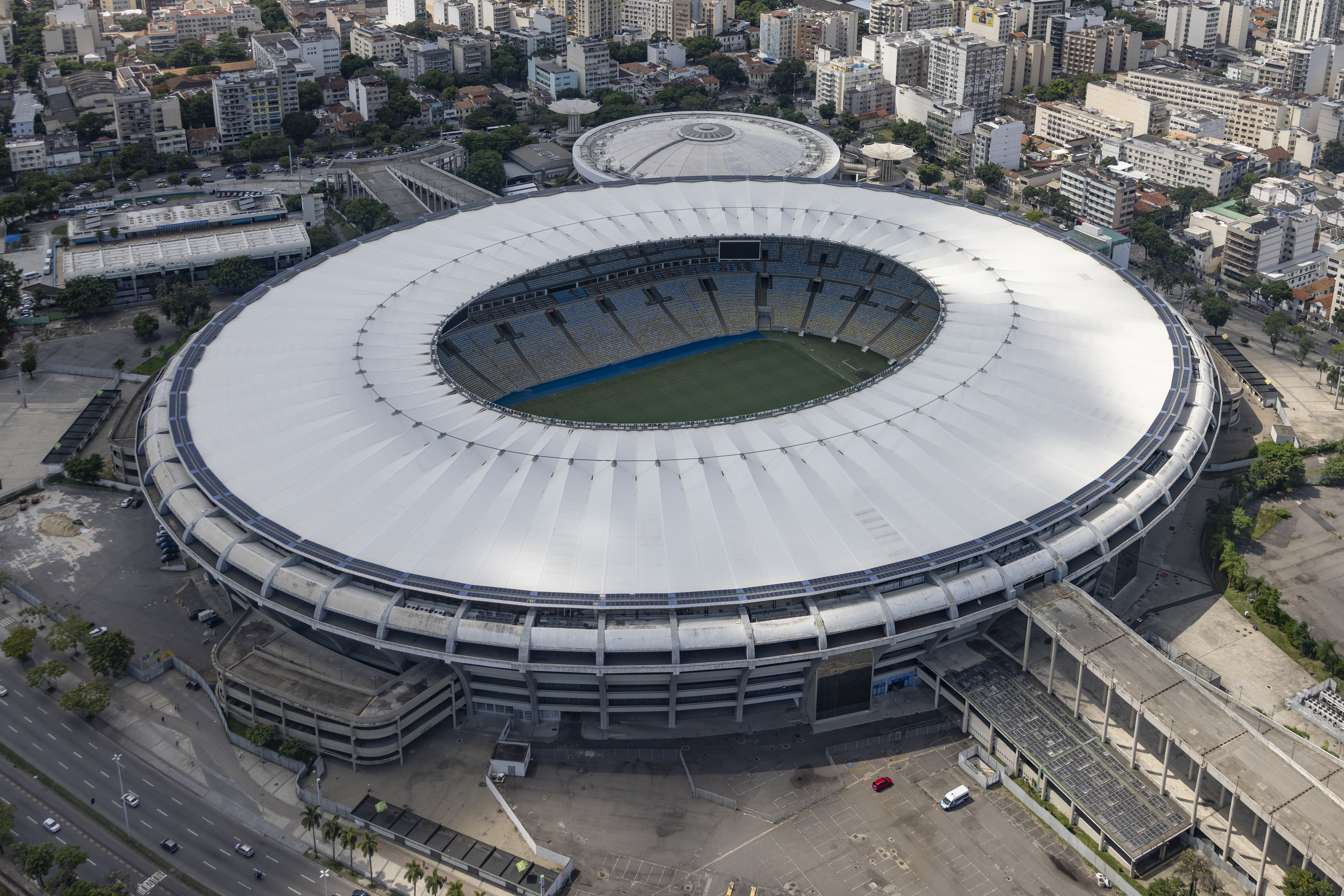
- The Estádio do Maracanã in Rio de Janeiro hosted the final.
- Event: 2021 Copa América
Argentina	Brazil
(Argentina)	(Brazil)
1	0
- Date: 10 July 2021
- Venue: Estádio do Maracanã, Rio de Janeiro
- Man of the Match: Ángel Di María (Argentina)
- Referee: Esteban Ostojich (Uruguay)
- Attendance: 6,500
- Weather: 21 °C (70 °F); 88% humidity

The 2021 Copa América final was a football match to determine the winners of the 2021 Copa América. The match was the 47th final of the Copa América, a quadrennial tournament contested by the men's national teams of the member associations of CONMEBOL. The match was held at Estádio do Maracanã in Rio de Janeiro, Brazil on 10 July 2021.

The match featured two rival teams: Argentina against the tournament hosts and defending champions, Brazil. Argentina won the match 1–0 to clinch their fifteenth Copa América title and first since 1993, giving captain Lionel Messi his first senior international trophy sixteen years into his career and ending a 28-year trophy drought. Argentina also equalled Uruguay's record of Copa América titles. Argentina would go on to win the CONMEBOL–UEFA Cup of Champions against Italy, as well as the 2022 FIFA World Cup.

== Background ==
Argentina and Brazil are long-time rivals, having played 107 prior matches in international competition. The two teams are among the most successful in South American football and had met in three prior Copa América finals in 1937, 2004, and 2007.

In Bangladesh, where the two teams have large fanbases, police banned outdoor gatherings in certain rural districts after clashes erupted between rival fans. In the Brahmanbaria District, a clash between fans resulted in serious injuries to four people.

== Venue ==
The 2021 Copa América was originally planned to be hosted by Argentina and Colombia, with the final scheduled for 12 July 2020 at the Estadio Metropolitano Roberto Meléndez in Barranquilla, Colombia. On 17 March 2020, CONMEBOL announced that the tournament would be postponed by a year due to the COVID-19 pandemic, alongside the 2020 European Championships. Weeks before the tournament, Colombia was removed as host amid the ongoing protests in the country, while Argentina announced that they would be unable to host due to the worsening COVID-19 case rate and were replaced with Brazil despite their high death rate.

For the second consecutive time, the final was held at Rio de Janeiro's Maracanã Stadium, the largest stadium in Brazil. It was opened at 10 percent capacity, or 6,500 spectators, for the match due to COVID-19 restrictions. The stadium was excluded from hosting matches in earlier rounds of the competition due to its damaged pitch and was replaced with Estádio Olímpico Nilton Santos, where players criticised the playing surface. The pitch at the Maracanã was re-laid by CONMEBOL a few days before the final.

== Officials ==
The referee in charge of the match was Esteban Ostojich from Uruguay. Ostojich, along with fellow Uruguayan linesmen Carlos Barreiro and Martín Soppi, had also officiated group stage matches between Brazil and Venezuela, Peru and Colombia, and quarter final match between Peru and Paraguay. Peruvian referee Diego Haro was the fourth official having officiated in the group stage match between Bolivia and Paraguay and also as fourth official in the Argentina versus Bolivia group stage match. Uruguayan Andrés Cunha was the main video assistant referee.

== Route to the final ==
Argentina
Round
Brazil
Opponent
Result
Group stage
Opponent
Result
Chile
1–1
Matchday 1
Venezuela
3–0
Uruguay
1–0
Matchday 2
Peru
4–0
Paraguay
1–0
Matchday 3
Colombia
2–1
Bolivia
4–1
Matchday 4
Ecuador
1–1
Group A winner

Pos	Team	Pld	Pts
1	Argentina	4	10
2	Uruguay	4	7
3	Paraguay	4	6
4	Chile	4	5
5	Bolivia	4	0

Source: CONMEBOL
Final standings
Group B winner

Pos	Team	Pld	Pts
1	Brazil (H)	4	10
2	Peru	4	7
3	Colombia	4	4
4	Ecuador	4	3
5	Venezuela	4	2

Source: CONMEBOL
(H) Hosts
Opponent
Result
Knockout stage
Opponent
Result
Ecuador
3–0
Quarter-finals
Chile
1–0
Colombia
1–1 (3–2 p)
Semi-finals
Peru
1–0

=== Argentina ===
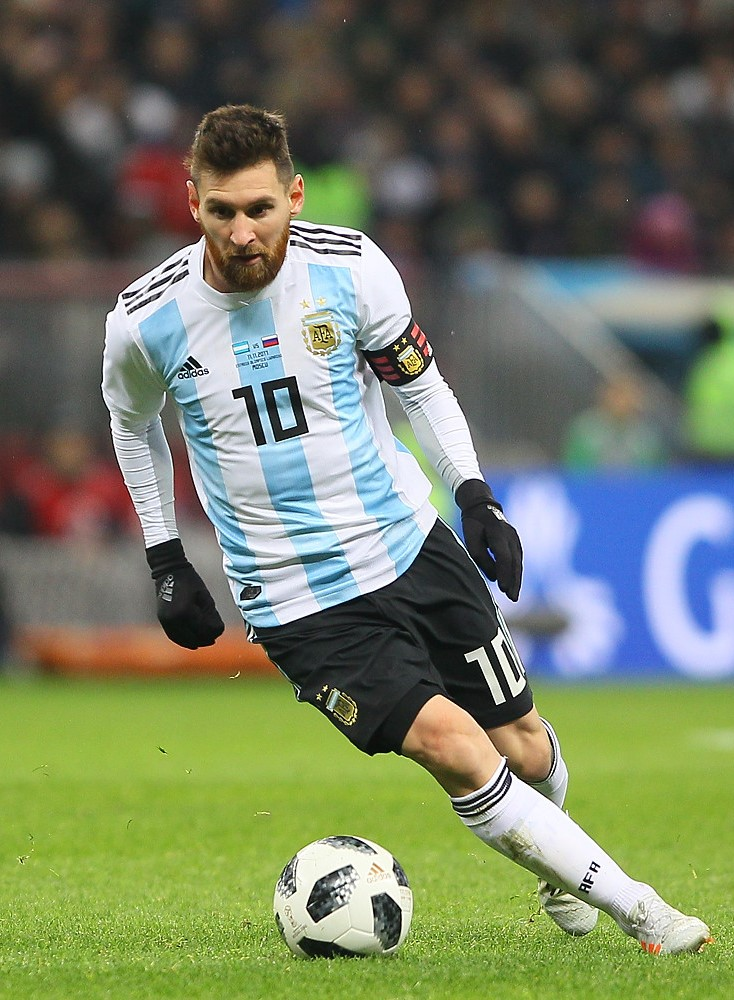
Lionel Messi scored four goals for Argentina en route to the final

Argentina was the second-most successful nation at the Copa América with 14 victories, only one behind Uruguay's all-time total of 15 titles, but had not won since 1993. The team was seeded into Group A one of the tournament's original co-hosts and was joined by Bolivia, Uruguay, Chile, Paraguay, and invitees Australia until their withdrawal. Argentina had been transitioning away from its 2010s "golden generation" in favor of a younger core, which was reflected in manager Lionel Scaloni's call-ups for La Albiceleste. The team remained led by captain Lionel Messi, along with veterans Ángel Di María and Sergio Agüero, as the last three remaining members of the 2014 World Cup team that finished as runners-up to Germany.

La Albiceleste opened the group stage against Chile, earning a 1–1 draw. Lionel Messi scored a free kick to give Argentina the lead in the first half, but Eduardo Vargas equalised in the second half by finishing a rebound shot after a penalty taken by Arturo Vidal was saved. Argentina moved to the top of Group A by defeating Uruguay 1–0 with a header scored by Guido Rodríguez off a cross from Messi. The team secured a berth in the knockout stage on the third matchday with a 1–0 victory against Paraguay; Papu Gómez scored the lone goal of the match in the 10th minute, receiving a through ball from Di María while unmarked in the penalty area. In the final match of the group stage, against Bolivia, Argentina won 4–1 to take first place in Group A. Papu Gómez opened the scoring with a short volley from inside the penalty area in the 6th minute. Messi, who had assisted Gómez's goal, added a pair of his own with a converted penalty in the 33rd minute and chipping goalkeeper Carlos Lampe from outside the box in the 42nd minute. Bolivia earned a consolation goal in the 60th minute through Erwin Saavedra, but Argentina restored their three-goal lead with a tap-in from Lautaro Martínez five minutes later.

Argentina played Ecuador, Group B's fourth-place finisher, in the quarter-finals to open the knockout stage. Messi was involved in all three of Argentina's goals in their 3–0 victory, with assists for Rodrigo De Paul in the 40th minute and Lautaro Martínez in the 84th minute before scoring a curling free kick of his own in stoppage time. The semi-final fixture against Colombia began with an early goal for Martínez in the seventh minute, but finished 1–1 in regulation time after an equaliser from Luis Díaz in the 61st minute. In the ensuing penalty shoot-out, Argentina goalkeeper Emiliano Martínez saved three shots to give the team a 3–2 win after five rounds. The match featured 10 yellow cards and 47 fouls, both setting records for the Copa América.

=== Brazil ===
Brazil had the third-most Copa América titles, at nine, and were defending their 2019 title. The team was drawn into Group B alongside original co-hosts Colombia, Venezuela, Ecuador, Peru, and invitees Qatar until their withdrawal. Manager Tite called up a majority of the players used in 2022 FIFA World Cup qualifying for much of 2020 and 2021, led by captain Thiago Silva and star forward Neymar. Despite a rumoured boycott reported in several newspapers, the Brazil squad agreed to play in the tournament but criticised CONMEBOL for its organisation of the Copa América in the country amid the COVID-19 pandemic.

The Seleção opened their title defense with a 3–0 victory against Venezuela, who had 15 emergency call-ups to replace players who had tested positive for COVID-19. Marquinhos scored in the 23rd minute to open the match and was followed by a penalty from Neymar in the 64th minute and a chested tap-in from Gabriel Barbosa in the 89th minute. Brazil followed with a 4–0 win over Peru in their second match, including three goals in the second half, to earn an early berth in the knockout stage. Alex Sandro opened the scoring in the 12th minute and was followed by Neymar in the 68th minute, Éverton Ribeiro in the 89th minute, and Richarlison in stoppage time.

Colombia took an early lead against Brazil in their third match through a 10th-minute bicycle kick scored by Luis Díaz, but the Seleção earned a 2–1 comeback victory through headers from Roberto Firmino in the 78th minute and Casemiro in the tenth minute of stoppage time. Firmino's equaliser was the subject of protests from Colombia due to the ball hitting the referee earlier in the sequence, but was ruled valid by the video assistant referee. Brazil's winning streak was ended at ten matches after a 1–1 draw with Ecuador to close out the group stage, finishing atop Group B while resting several starting players. A 37th-minute header from Éder Militão, scoring his first international goal, gave Brazil a half-time lead, but substitute Ángel Mena equalised for Ecuador in the 53rd minute with a strike after a corner kick failed to be cleared.

Brazil were held to a scoreless first half in their quarter-finals fixture against Chile, but broke through with a 46th-minute strike from half-time substitute Lucas Paquetá. Two minutes later, the team lost Gabriel Jesus to a red card after a high kick to the face of Eugenio Mena, but Brazil kept a shutout to win 1–0. The semi-final fixture against Peru marked a rematch from the group stage and the 2019 final for the Seleção. The match ended in a 1–0 victory for Brazil, with the lone goal scored by Paquetá in the 35th minute after Neymar dribbled past three defenders to provide an assist.

== Match ==
=== Summary ===
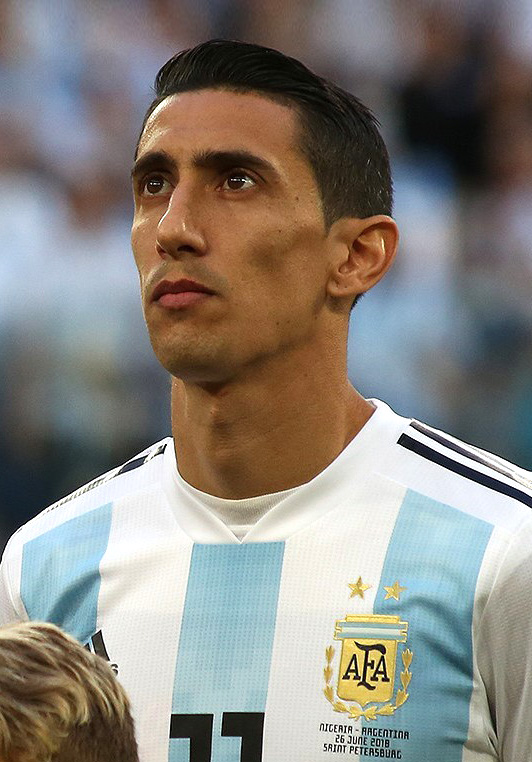
Ángel Di María scored the lone goal of the Copa América final and was named man of the match

The match began after a minute of silence for victims of the COVID-19 pandemic, with Argentina leading in possession and early chances. Brazilian midfielder Fred received a yellow card in the third minute for a challenge on Gonzalo Montiel, beginning a series of fouls from players on both teams. Ángel Di María opened the scoring for Argentina in the 22nd minute, receiving a long pass from Rodrigo De Paul and beating defender Renan Lodi to lob the ball over the advancing goalkeeper Ederson. Brazil responded with a series of attacks, including one that forced a save out of Emiliano Martínez, but lost possession to an Argentina counter-attack that ended in a missed shot from Lionel Messi after the half-hour mark. The first half ended with a 1–0 lead for Argentina.

Brazil manager Tite replaced Fred with attacking midfielder Roberto Firmino to begin the second half in search of an equaliser. Di María's attempt to extend Argentina's lead in the 50th minute was blocked and led to a Brazilian counterattack through Neymar that was suppressed by a foul by Giovani Lo Celso, who received a yellow card. Richarlison appeared to have equalised for Brazil with a shot from inside the penalty area in the 52nd minute that was ruled offside; he followed up a minute later with another strike that was saved by Martínez. Nicolás Otamendi was shown a yellow card in the 81st minute for a foul on Neymar, which triggered arguments and a shoving match between both sides. After a pair of chances for Brazil that were repelled by Martínez, Argentina sprung on a counterattack in the 88th minute that ended with Messi stumbling while trying to dribble around Ederson. The match ended in a 1–0 victory for Argentina, securing their first Copa América title since 1993.

=== Details ===
10 July 2021
21:00 BRT (UTC−3)

Argentina	1–0	Brazil
Di María 22'	Report

Estádio do Maracanã, Rio de Janeiro
Attendance: 7,800 (Note: The total capacity of the stadium to allow fans to attend the final was established at 10% due to the COVID-19 pandemic in South America.)
Referee: Esteban Ostojich (Uruguay)

Argentina	Brazil

GK	23	Emiliano Martínez
RB	4	Gonzalo Montiel	(yellow card) 89'
CB	13	Cristian Romero		(substituted off) 79'
CB	19	Nicolás Otamendi	(yellow card) 81'
LB	8	Marcos Acuña
CM	7	Rodrigo De Paul	(yellow card) 68'
CM	5	Leandro Paredes	(yellow card) 33'	(substituted off) 54'
CM	20	Giovani Lo Celso	(yellow card) 51'	(substituted off) 63'
RF	10	Lionel Messi (c)
CF	22	Lautaro Martínez		(substituted off) 79'
LF	11	Ángel Di María		(substituted off) 79'
Substitutions:
MF	18	Guido Rodríguez		(substituted on) 54'
DF	3	Nicolás Tagliafico		(substituted on) 63'
DF	6	Germán Pezzella		(substituted on) 79'
FW	15	Nicolás González		(substituted on) 79'
MF	14	Exequiel Palacios		(substituted on) 79'
Manager:
Lionel Scaloni

GK	23	Ederson
RB	2	Danilo
CB	4	Marquinhos	(yellow card) 82'
CB	3	Thiago Silva (c)
LB	16	Renan Lodi	(yellow card) 70'	(substituted off) 76'
CM	5	Casemiro
CM	8	Fred	(yellow card) 3'	(substituted off) 46'
RW	7	Richarlison
AM	17	Lucas Paquetá	(yellow card) 72'	(substituted off) 76'
LW	19	Everton		(substituted off) 63'
CF	10	Neymar
Substitutions:
FW	20	Roberto Firmino		(substituted on) 46'
FW	18	Vinícius Júnior		(substituted on) 63'
DF	13	Emerson Royal		(substituted on) 76'
FW	21	Gabriel Barbosa		(substituted on) 76'
Manager:
Tite

Man of the Match:
Ángel Di María (Argentina)

Assistant referees:
Carlos Barreiro (Uruguay)
Martín Soppi (Uruguay)
Fourth official:
Diego Haro (Peru)
Fifth official:
José Antelo (Bolivia)
Video assistant referee:
Andrés Cunha (Uruguay)
Assistant video assistant referees:
Daniel Fedorczuk (Uruguay)
Alexander Guzmán (Colombia)
Jhon Ospina (Colombia)

Match rules

- 90 minutes.
- 30 minutes of extra time if necessary.
- Penalty shoot-out if scores still level.
- Maximum of twelve named substitutes.
- Maximum of five substitutions, with a sixth allowed in extra time. (Note: Each team was given only three opportunities to make substitutions, with a fourth opportunity in extra time, excluding substitutions made at half-time, before the start of extra time and at half-time in extra time.)

=== Statistics ===
Overall
Statistic	Argentina	Brazil
Goals scored	1	0
Total shots	6	13
Shots on target	2	2
Saves	2	1
Ball possession	41%	59%
Corner kicks	1	4
Fouls committed	26	23
Offsides	0	3
Yellow cards	5	4
Red cards	0	0

== Post-match ==
Argentina won its 15th Copa América, tying Uruguay for the all-time record in the tournament, after finishing as runners-up in four editions since its last title in 1993. It was also the first senior international trophy won by Lionel Messi, who had led Argentina to three Copa América finals and the 2014 FIFA World Cup final, also played at the Maracanã. Di María was named the man of the match, while Messi was named the best player of the tournament and shared the top goalscorer award with Luis Díaz of Colombia. Martínez was named the tournament's best goalkeeper.

With the match's result, Argentina continued its unbeaten streak, which reached 20 matches, while Brazil had its first competitive defeat since 2018. After the match, manager Tite criticised the organisation of the Copa América and described the final as "stop-start" with "anti-football" preventing Brazil from playing well.
