= Juan Cuadrado =

Colombian footballer (born 1988)

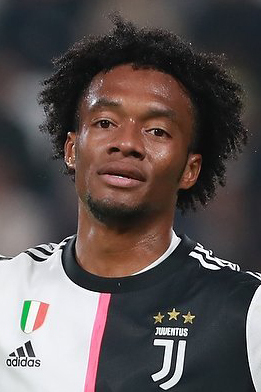
- Cuadrado with Juventus in 2019

Personal information
- Full name: Juan Guillermo Cuadrado Bello
- Date of birth: 26 May 1988 (age 38)
- Place of birth: Necoclí, Colombia
- Height: 1.76 m (5 ft 9 in)
- Positions: Winger; right-back

Team information
- Current team: Millonarios
- Number: 7

Youth career
- Atlético Urabá
- 2003–2008: Independiente Medellín

Senior career*
Years	Team	Apps	(Gls)
2008–2009	Independiente Medellín	30	(2)
2009–2012	Udinese	20	(0)
2011–2012	→ Lecce (loan)	33	(3)
2012–2015	Fiorentina	85	(20)
2015–2017	Chelsea	13	(0)
2015–2017	→ Juventus (loan)	58	(6)
2017–2023	Juventus	166	(14)
2023–2024	Inter Milan	10	(0)
2024–2025	Atalanta	23	(0)
2025–2026	Pisa	19	(1)
2026–	Millonarios	6	(1)

International career
2010–2023	Colombia	116	(11)
Medal record
Representing Colombia
Men's football
Copa América
Third place	2016 United States
Third place	2021 Brazil
- * Club domestic league appearances and goals as of 8 November 2026

Juan Guillermo Cuadrado Bello (born 26 May 1988) is a Colombian professional footballer who plays for Millonarios. He usually plays on the right side of the pitch, either as a winger, wing-back, or full-back. He is known for his direct style of play, including his pace both on and off the ball, as well as his dribbling skills.

Having begun his career at Independiente Medellín, Cuadrado moved to Italy in 2009 to join Udinese. Used sparingly at the club, he was loaned to Lecce for the 2011–12 season, where despite relegation from Serie A, his performance earned a transfer to Fiorentina. In February 2015, he was signed by Chelsea, but after playing sparingly, was loaned to Juventus for consecutive seasons, where he won successive Serie A and Coppa Italia titles. He joined the club permanently in 2017, and added a third consecutive domestic double the following season, followed by two more consecutive league titles and a Supercoppa Italiana over the next two seasons. In June 2023, after deciding not to extend his contract with Juventus, Cuadrado signed for Inter Milan on a free transfer, agreeing to a one-year contract. After missing most of the 2023–24 season due to injuries, Cuadrado joined Atalanta as a free agent on a one-year deal.

Cuadrado made his senior debut for Colombia in 2010, and went on to earn over 110 caps. He was part of the squads that took part at five editions of the Copa América (2011, 2015, 2016, 2019 and 2021), reaching the quarter-finals on three occasions, and contributing to their third-place finishes in 2016 and 2021; Cuadrado also represented his nation at two editions of the FIFA World Cup, in 2014 and 2018.

== Club career ==
=== Early career ===
Born in Necoclí, Cuadrado first form of football development wasn't until his mother suggested him the idea at the age of 12, joining Manchester F.C. Apartadó, a youth academy located in Apartadó, Antioquia. Consequently, his notable performances allowed him to join the youth setup of Deportivo Cali after impressing their scouts. Cuadrado later joined Atlético Uraba, where his preferred position was as a forward. However, on the recommendation of club founder Nelson Gallego, Cuadrado took on a midfielder role, usually as a winger. Cuadrado's confidence and ability in the position also allowed him to play occasionally as a full-back or wing-back. He later had a brief spell at Colombian second division club Rionegro, where he languished on the bench under coach Víctor González Scott, but his potential was later recognized by manager Juan José Peláez of Independiente Medellín.

=== Independiente Medellín ===
He was eventually signed by Medellin in 2008, allowing him to return to the first division. That year, Cuadrado made his senior professional debut against Boyacá Chicó, a match in which he would also score his first goal. Cuadrado remained in Medellin until 2009, before making the leap to European football.

=== Udinese ===
On 2 July 2009, Cuadrado signed with Serie A club Udinese on a five-year deal for an undisclosed fee. He played his first match for Udinese in a 2–1 win against Chievo as a right wing back. Cuadrado, however, was not given many first-team minutes for the rest of the season, and he would be sent on loan to fellow Serie A side Lecce.

==== Lecce (loan) ====
On 3 August 2011, it was officially confirmed that Cuadrado would join Lecce for the 2011–12 season. He scored his first goal for the club against Cesena, the sole goal in a 1–0 victory. In spite of further impressive performances from Cuadrado, however, Lecce finished 18th and was relegated to Serie B. He would then return to Udinese. Around this time, he was watched by an unidentified English club who deemed that at 23 years he was too old to be signed by the club.

=== Fiorentina ===
On 23 July 2012, Cuadrado completed his move to Fiorentina, initially in a temporary deal for a €1 million transfer fee. He scored his first goal for the Florence club in a 4–1 victory at home against Cagliari. He finished the season with five goals and six assists, an integral part of a side that finished fourth in Serie A. In June 2013, La Viola purchased half of the registration rights of Cuadrado for €5 million.

On 11 February 2014, Cuadrado scored Fiorentina's second goal of a 2–0 Coppa Italia semi-final second leg victory over his former club Udinese, securing La Viola a 3–2 aggregate victory and a spot in the final. He was booked after scoring the winning goal, and suspended for the final, which his team lost 1–3 to Napoli on 3 May.

On 16 June 2014, amid media speculation of a move to a larger club by the player, Fiorentina agreed a deal to purchase full ownership of Cuadrado's contract from Udinese, for an additional €12 million.

=== Chelsea ===
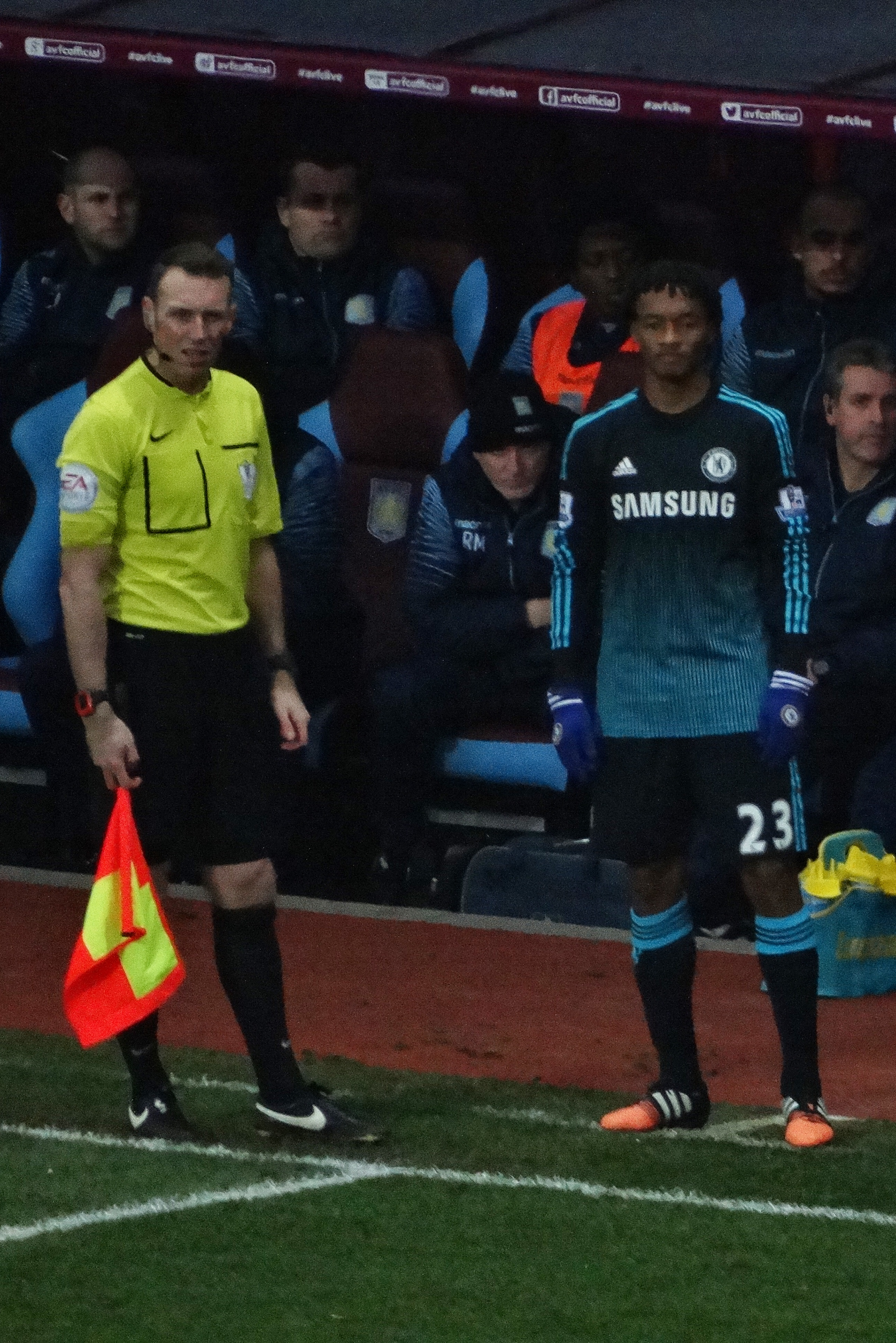
Cuadrado awaiting his debut for Chelsea at Villa Park on 7 February 2015

On 2 February 2015, Premier League club Chelsea announced the signing of Cuadrado from Fiorentina on a four-and-a-half-year deal, for a reported initial fee of £23.3 million, which could potentially rise to £26.8 million; Mohamed Salah went the other way on loan. While in Fiorentina's financial filing of year 2014, in the management report (Italian: Relazione sulla Gestione), Fiorentina declared the fee was €30 million. Upon signing, Cuadrado said, "I am very happy and thankful for this opportunity I've been given. This is a great club and honestly it is like a dream to join the Chelsea family and to know that the manager (José Mourinho) believes in me. I'm happy." His Fiorentina manager, Vincenzo Montella, stated, "It was a sale that had to be done. Cuadrado is a player that has always arrived with a smile and given everything to Fiorentina – I'm happy for him because he is going to a big club." Mourinho commented that he was not in a "rush" for Cuadrado to fully showcase his abilities within a short time, as stated in an interview: "He needs time to adapt to the Premier League. I know Italy and I know the difference between Italy and England; his formation, his development, his experience – everything was in Italy."

Five days after signing, Cuadrado made his Chelsea debut after replacing Willian for the last ten minutes of a 2–1 win away against Aston Villa. On 11 February, he made his first start in his first appearance at Stamford Bridge, playing the first 70 minutes before being replaced by Cesc Fàbregas in a 1–0 win against Everton. He won his first Chelsea trophy on 1 March as the club defeated rival club Tottenham Hotspur 2–0 in the League Cup final, coming on in the 76th minute for Willian.

On 3 May, Cuadrado made his only third start since his move to Chelsea, in the London derby match against Crystal Palace, as Ramires was taken ill before the game. At half-time, however, Cuadrado was substituted for Mikel John Obi; Chelsea ended up claiming their fifth league title with a 1–0 victory. Three weeks later, in the final match of the season against Sunderland, he won a penalty when fouled by John O'Shea, on which Diego Costa evened the score in an eventual 3–1 home win, but he was later substituted when he was injured in the final minute of the first half.

=== Juventus ===
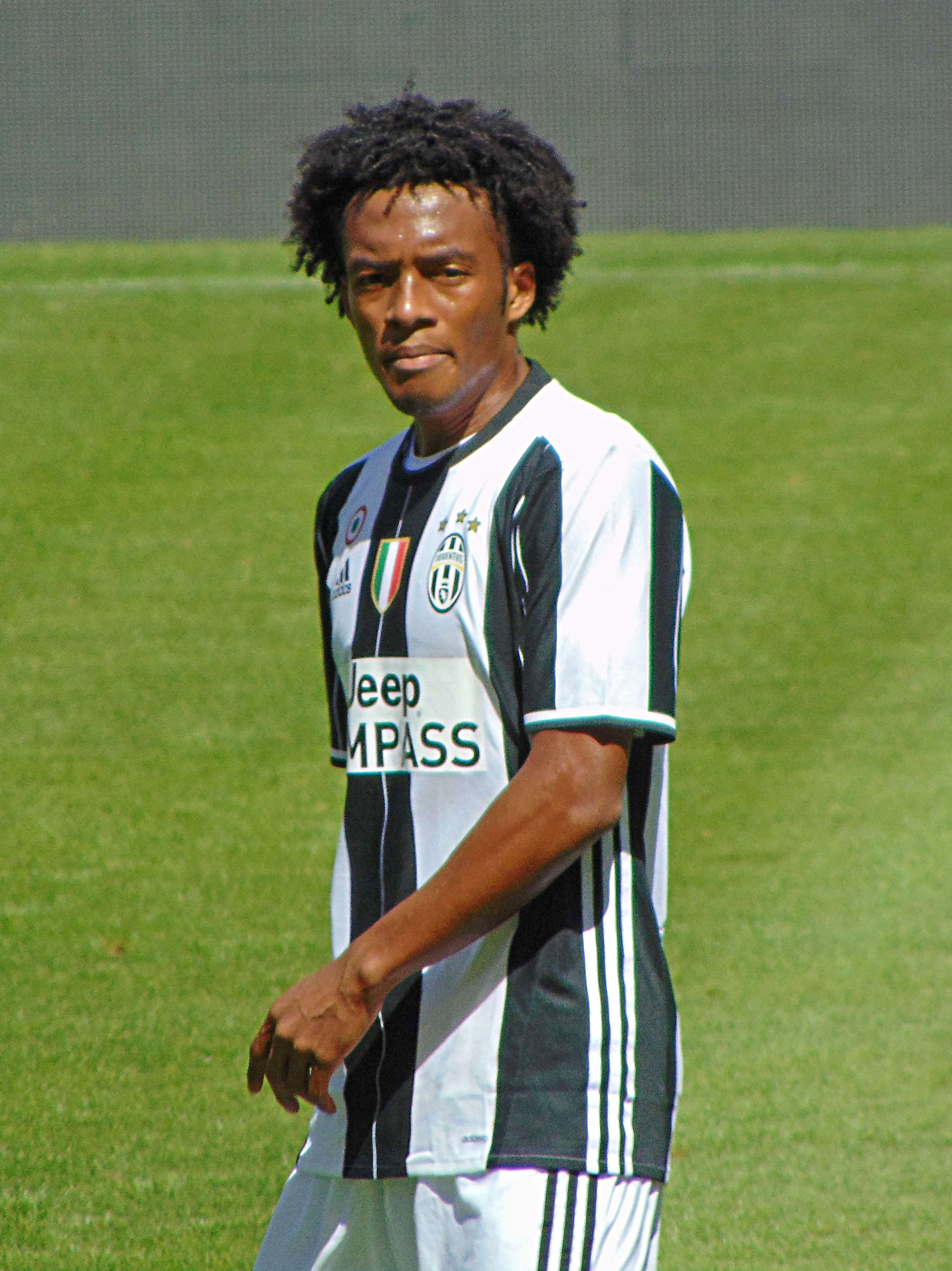
Cuadrado playing for Juventus in 2017

On 25 August 2015, Cuadrado signed a season-long loan deal with Juventus for €1.5 million. He was issued squad number 16. Five days later, he made his debut, as a 75th-minute substitute in a 2–1 defeat away against Roma. On 31 October, Cuadrado scored his first Juventus goal against Torino to secure a 2–1 win in extra time at the end of the Derby della Mole. On 16 March 2016, Cuadrado scored his first ever UEFA Champions League goal in a 4–2 away defeat against Bayern Munich, in the second leg of the round of 16. On 21 May, he came off the bench to set-up Álvaro Morata's match-winning goal against Milan in the 110th minute of extra time of the 2016 Coppa Italia final, in Rome's Stadio Olimpico; Juventus' 1–0 victory enabled the club to secure the domestic double for the second consecutive season.

Cuadrado returned to Chelsea on 30 June 2016 and played a few friendlies for Chelsea, including the 2016 International Champions Cup. On 31 August, however, Cuadrado returned to Juventus on a three-year loan for €5 million per season, plus a conditional obligation to buy the full registration rights of Cuadrado from Chelsea for an additional €20 million (or €15 million and €10 million in the second and the third year of loan respectively), after certain sports related achievements. Chelsea would also receive a maximum of €4 million bonuses, making the fee potentially raise to €29 million. He was assigned the number 7 shirt at this time. Cuadrado scored his first league goal in nine months on 5 February 2017, scoring the only goal in a 1–0 home win in a Derby d'Italia clash with Inter Milan.

On 22 May 2017, it was announced that Cuadrado had joined Juventus on a permanent deal for a preset price of €20 million until 2020, after a clause in his contract had been triggered (winning the Serie A mathematically in round 37). In the 2017 UEFA Champions League Final against defending champions Real Madrid on 3 June, Cuadrado came on as a substitute for Andrea Barzagli in the 60th minute, but was later controversially sent off after picking up two yellow cards, the second for an alleged stamp on Sergio Ramos; Juventus lost the match 4–1.

Following the arrival of Cristiano Ronaldo from Real Madrid in 2018, Cuadrado allowed Ronaldo to wear the number 7 shirt, with Cuadrado reverting to number 16, saying on Instagram "It is better to give than to receive [...] Blessings to Cristiano in this new adventure".

On 21 September 2019, Cuadrado made his 100th Serie A appearance with Juventus in a 2–1 home win over Verona, during which he won a penalty which was converted by Cristiano Ronaldo. During the 2019–20 season, under the club's new manager Maurizio Sarri, Cuadrado was often deployed as an attacking right-back. On 3 November, he made his 150th appearance for the club in a 1–0 away win over cross-city rivals Torino in the Derby della Mole. Later that month, he extended his contract with the club until 2022. On 5 December 2020, Juventus won against Torino by a score margin of 2–1, where Cuadrado assisted both the goals. On 15 May 2021, he scored a brace in a 3–2 home victory over Inter Milan. In the 2020–21 season, Cuadrado earned the title of best assistman of the UEFA Champions League with six assists in six games. On 5 December, Cuadrado scored an olympic goal in a 2–0 win against Genoa.

On 30 June 2023, Juventus bid farewell to Cuadrado after eight years with the club.

=== Inter Milan ===
On 19 July 2023, Cuadrado joined Inter Milan on a one-year deal. In December 2023, Cuadrado suffered a surgery-requiring achilles tendon injury. His injury was operated in Turku, Finland by surgeon Lasse Lempainen in late December 2023.

=== Atalanta ===
On 26 August 2024, Cuadrado joined as a free agent for fellow Serie A side Atalanta on a one-year contract.

=== Pisa ===
On 6 August 2025, Cuadrado joined Pisa on a free transfer, signing a one-year contract with the then recently promoted Serie A side.

== International career ==
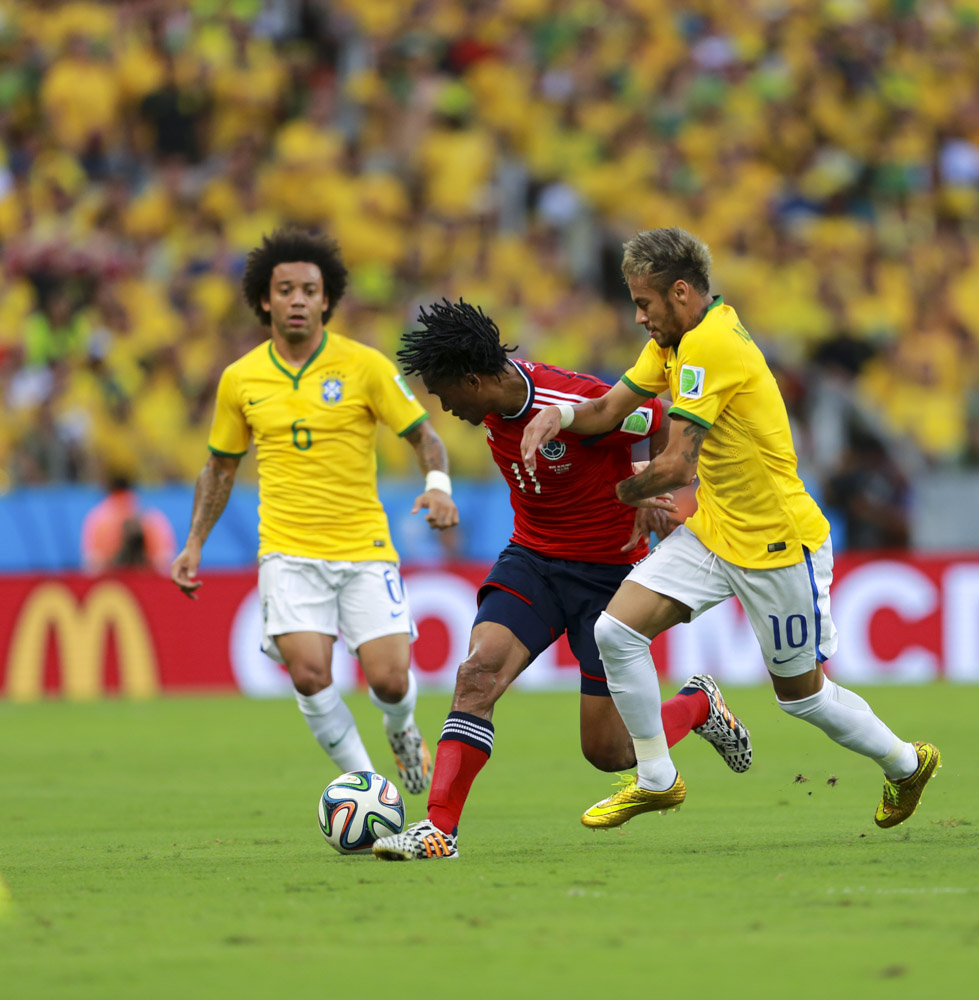
Cuadrado (in red) on the ball against Brazil's Neymar (right) and Marcelo (left) at the 2014 FIFA World Cup

After being transferred to Udinese, Cuadrado received his first call-up to the Colombia national team, as well as a spot in the starting XI in a match against Venezuela on 3 September 2010, scoring the opening goal of a 2–0 victory at the Estadio José Antonio Anzoátegui in Puerto La Cruz.

Cuadrado was in the Colombian squad which reached the quarter-finals of the 2011 Copa América in Argentina. His only appearance of the competition came in their last group match, a 2–0 victory over Bolivia in Santa Fe, replacing Fredy Guarín after 50 minutes.

Cuadrado was named in Colombia's 23-man squad for the 2014 FIFA World Cup. In the third group stage match, a 4–1 victory against Japan, he scored the team's opening goal on a penalty kick. He would end his World Cup campaign with four assists, tying Toni Kroos as the competition's assist leader.

Cuadrado played every minute of Colombia's run to the quarter-finals of the 2015 Copa América in Chile, and scored in their penalty shootout defeat against Argentina.

On 13 October 2015, Cuadrado was sent off at the end of Colombia's 3–0 loss away against Uruguay in 2018 FIFA World Cup qualification, for elbowing Diego Rolán. Cuadrado was included in Colombia's 23-man squad for the Copa América Centenario.

In the 2018 FIFA World Cup, Cuadrado played all four games as Colombia reached the knock-out stage, where they lost to England on penalties in the round of 16. He scored one goal, the final one in a 3–0 win against Poland in Group H.

On 30 May 2019, Cuadrado was included in the 23-man final Colombia squad for the 2019 Copa América.

In June 2021, he was included in Colombia's squad for the 2021 Copa América in Brazil. On 23 June he assisted Colombia's opening goal, scored by Luis Díaz, in a 2–1 first-round loss to the host nation. He made his 100th cap for Colombia on 7 July, in the semi-final match against Argentina which his side lost on penalties; he became the fifth Colombian player to enter the FIFA Century Club. On 9 July, he scored Colombia's first goal from a free kick in a 3–2 victory over Peru in the third-place match.

== Style of play ==
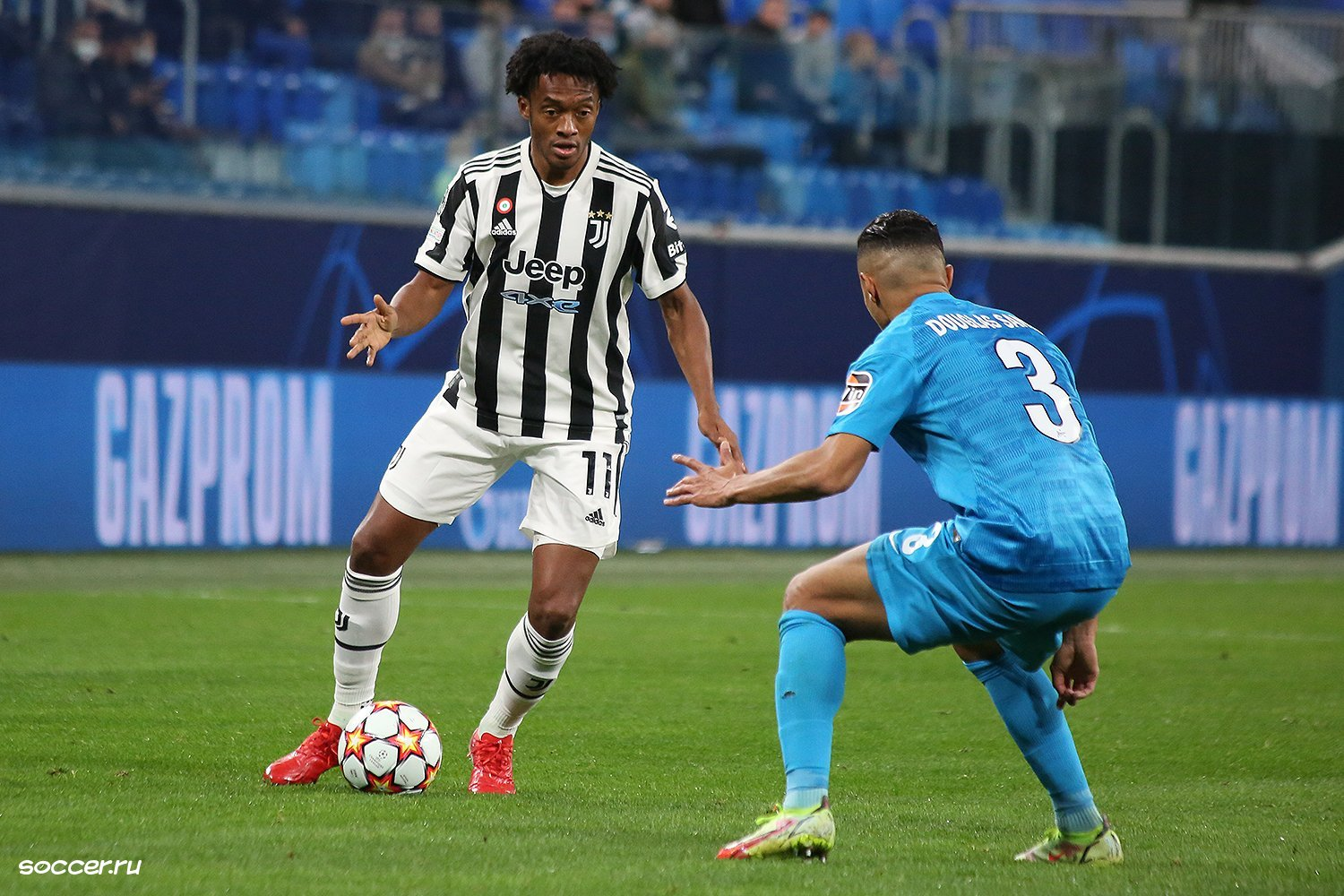
Cuadrado taking on Douglas Santos, in a UEFA Champions League match between Juventus and Zenit Saint Petersburg

Cuadrado is known for his direct, offensive style of play along the right flank, and is capable of both scoring goals himself, courtesy of his striking ability from distance, as well as creating goalscoring opportunities for his teammates. He is capable of playing both as a wide midfielder, or as a winger in an attacking trident, due to his ability to make attacking runs down the wing. He often utilises his speed, flair, and technical skills to beat opponents in one on one situations and create space and time for him to shoot on goal, or deliver crosses to strikers in the area. Due to his playing style, which frequently involves taking on full-backs on the flank, and subsequently running towards the touch-line to deliver balls into the area, he has been labelled one of the few "traditional" wide midfielders in the current game.

Tim Vickery, a reporter on South American football, stated that as Colombia's defensive players played near the goal in order to cover for veteran centre-back Mario Yepes, Cuadrado's pace, agility, creativity and dribbling ability on the right wing moved the team forward at the 2014 World Cup. Vickery also added that, in addition to his main role on the wing, Cuadrado is also adept as an attacking right back or wing back, due to his energy and work rate, as well as his other aforementioned qualities; he has also been used in this position more recently at Juventus, under managers Massimiliano Allegri, Maurizio Sarri, and Andrea Pirlo. A versatile player, he is also capable of playing on the left, a position which allows him to cut into the middle and shoot on goal with his stronger, right foot. In his early career, he was initially deployed as a central or defensive midfielder, and was even deployed as an outright forward or striker; he is also capable of playing as an attacking midfielder, or as a second striker on occasion, and has even been used as a more offensive-minded central midfielder at times, known as the mezz'ala role, in Italian (which literally translates to "half-winger").

Despite his talent and ability, Cuadrado's decision-making and reading of the game have been criticised at times in the media; moreover, he has also drawn criticism at times from some in the sport for being inconsistent, and for having an overly individualistic playing style. In 2017, Mina Rzouki of ESPN FC noted that "Cuadrado has yet to learn the art of making decisive runs on a consistent basis. Still naive and capable of slowing down a game despite his pace, he does not boast the football intelligence of a world-beater."

== Personal life ==
Cuadrado was born in Necoclí as the son of Marcela Bello Guerrero and Guillermo Cuadrado. His father was shot by an armed gang when he was four years old. His mother, who solely supported them working at a banana distributor, stated in an interview that Cuadrado had to be a perfect student in order to be able to play football. As of July 2014, Cuadrado lived with his family in Florence. Cuadrado is a devout Christian.

Cuadrado was featured on the Latin American cover of FIFA 16, alongside global cover star and football icon Lionel Messi.

== Career statistics ==
=== Club ===
As of match played 8 November 2026

Appearances and goals by club, season and competition
Club	Season	League			National cup (Note: Includes Coppa Italia, FA Cup)		League cup (Note: Includes EFL Cup)		Continental		Other		Total	
Club	Season	Division	Apps	Goals	Apps	Goals	Apps	Goals	Apps	Goals	Apps	Goals	Apps	Goals
Independiente Medellín	2008	Categoría Primera A	21	2	—		—		—		—		21	2
Independiente Medellín	2009	Categoría Primera A	9	0	—		—		2 (Note: Appearances in Copa Libertadores)	0	—		11	0
Independiente Medellín	Total		30	2	—		—		2	0	—		32	2
Udinese	2009–10	Serie A	11	0	1	0	—		—		—		12	0
Udinese	2010–11	Serie A	9	0	3	0	—		—		—		12	0
Udinese	Total		20	0	4	0	—		—		—		24	0
Lecce (loan)	2011–12	Serie A	33	3	0	0	—		—		—		33	3
Fiorentina	2012–13	Serie A	36	5	4	0	—		—		—		40	5
Fiorentina	2013–14	Serie A	32	11	3	1	—		8 (Note: Appearances in UEFA Europa League)	3	—		43	15
Fiorentina	2014–15	Serie A	17	4	1	1	—		5	1	—		23	6
Fiorentina	Total		85	20	8	2	—		13	4	—		106	26
Chelsea	2014–15	Premier League	12	0	—		1	0	1 (Note: Appearance(s) in UEFA Champions League)	0	—		14	0
Chelsea	2015–16	Premier League	1	0	0	0	0	0	0	0	—		1	0
Chelsea	Total		13	0	0	0	1	0	1	0	—		15	0
Juventus (loan)	2015–16	Serie A	28	4	4	0	—		8	1	—		40	5
Juventus (loan)	2016–17	Serie A	30	2	3	0	—		12	1	0	0	45	3
Juventus	2017–18	Serie A	21	4	1	0	—		6	1	1 (Note: Appearance in Supercoppa Italiana)	0	29	5
Juventus	2018–19	Serie A	18	1	0	0	—		5	0	0	0	23	1
Juventus	2019–20	Serie A	33	2	5	0	—		6	1	1	0	45	3
Juventus	2020–21	Serie A	30	2	3	0	—		6	0	1	0	40	2
Juventus	2021–22	Serie A	33	4	5	1	—		7	0	0	0	45	5
Juventus	2022–23	Serie A	31	1	2	1	—		14 (Note: Six appearances in UEFA Champions League, eight appearances in UEFA Europa League)	0	—		47	2
Juventus	Total		224	20	23	2	—		64	4	3	0	314	26
Inter Milan	2023–24	Serie A	10	0	0	0	—		2	0	0	0	12	0
Atalanta	2024–25	Serie A	23	0	1	0	—		8	0	0	0	32	0
Pisa	2025–26	Serie A	19	1	2	0	—		—		—		21	1
Millonarios	2026	Categoría Primera A	6	1	0	0	—		—		—		6	1
Career total			463	47	38	4	1	0	90	8	3	0	595	59

=== International ===
National team	Year	Apps	Goals
Colombia	2010	4	1
Colombia	2011	4	0
Colombia	2012	7	2
Colombia	2013	11	0
Colombia	2014	11	2
Colombia	2015	9	0
Colombia	2016	14	1
Colombia	2017	8	1
Colombia	2018	9	1
Colombia	2019	12	0
Colombia	2020	4	0
Colombia	2021	15	2
Colombia	2022	5	0
Colombia	2023	3	1
Total		116	11

Colombia score listed first, score column indicates score after each Cuadrado goal.

International goals by date, venue, opponent, score, result and competition
No.	Date	Venue	Opponent	Score	Result	Competition
1	3 September 2010	Estadio José Antonio Anzoátegui, Puerto la Cruz, Venezuela	Venezuela	1–0	2–0	Friendly
2	29 February 2012	Sun Life Stadium, Miami Gardens, United States	Mexico	2–0	2–0	Friendly
3	14 November 2012	MetLife Stadium, East Rutherford, United States	Brazil	1–0	1–1	Friendly
4	6 June 2014	Estadio Pedro Bidegain, Buenos Aires, Argentina	Jordan	2–0	3–0	Friendly
5	24 June 2014	Arena Pantanal, Cuiabá, Brazil	Japan	1–0	4–1	2014 FIFA World Cup
6	29 May 2016	Marlins Park, Miami, United States	Haiti	2–1	3–1	Friendly
7	28 March 2017	Estadio Olímpico Atahualpa, Quito, Ecuador	Ecuador	2–0	2–0	2018 FIFA World Cup qualification
8	24 June 2018	Kazan Arena, Kazan, Russia	Poland	3–0	3–0	2018 FIFA World Cup
9	9 July 2021	Estádio Nacional Mané Garrincha, Brasília, Brazil	Peru	1–1	3–2	2021 Copa América
10	5 September 2021	Estadio Defensores del Chaco, Asunción, Paraguay	Paraguay	1–1	1–1	2022 FIFA World Cup qualification
11	20 June 2023	Arena AufSchalke, Gelsenkirchen, Germany	Germany	2–0	2–0	Friendly

== Honours ==
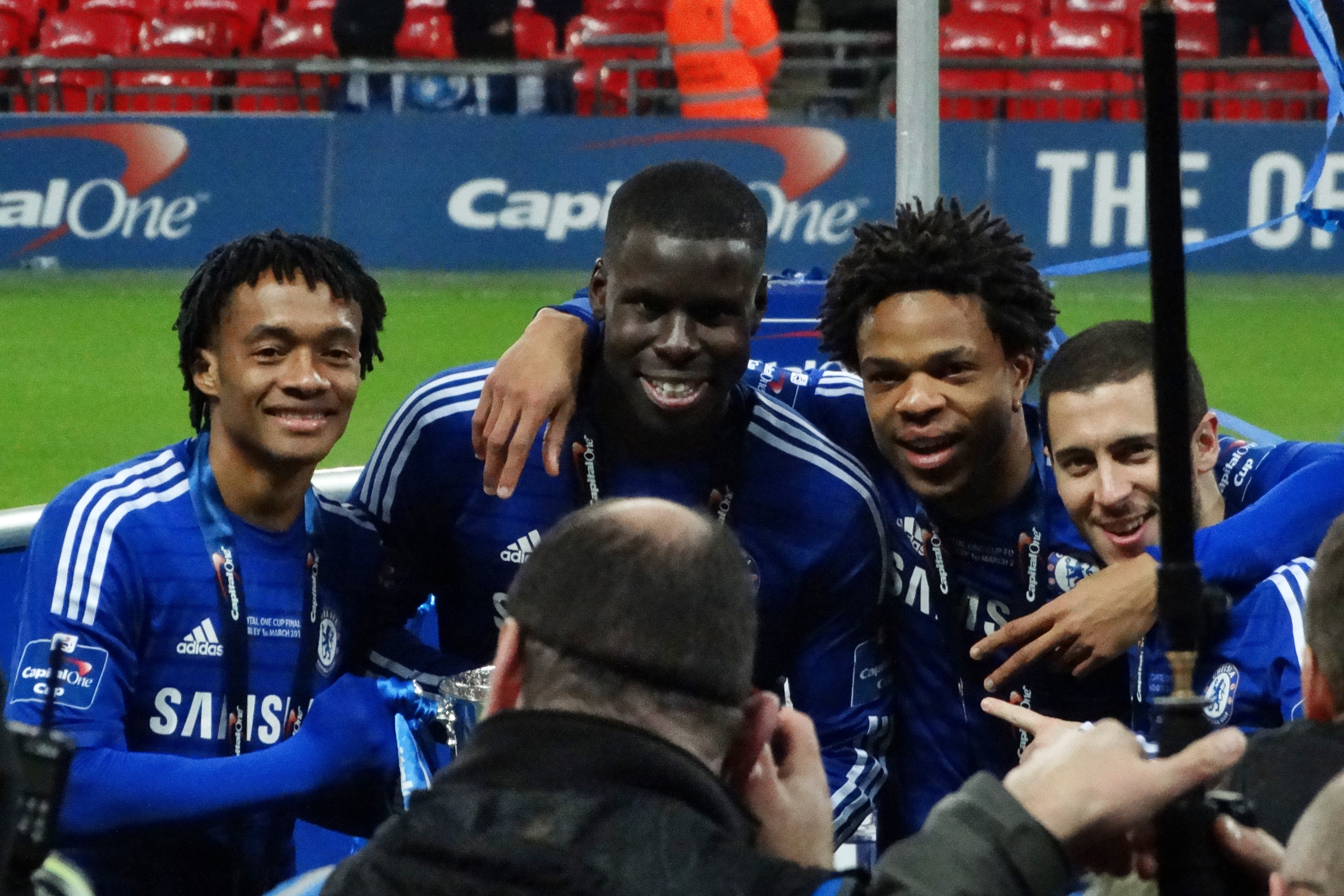
Cuadrado (left) holding the League Cup and wearing a winners' medal after the 2015 League Cup final

Chelsea

- Premier League: 2014–15
- Football League Cup: 2014–15

Juventus

- Serie A: 2015–16, 2016–17, 2017–18, 2018–19, 2019–20
- Coppa Italia: 2015–16, 2016–17, 2017–18, 2020–21
- Supercoppa Italiana: 2018, 2020
- UEFA Champions League runner-up: 2016–17

Inter Milan

- Serie A: 2023–24
- Supercoppa Italiana: 2023

Colombia

- Copa América third place: 2016, 2021

Individual

- Serie A Goal of the Month: December 2021
- UEFA Champions League Top assist provider: 2020–21
- FIFA World Cup Top assist provider: 2014
- IFFHS Team of the Copa América: 2021

== See also ==
- List of men's footballers with 100 or more international caps
