= Erwin Saavedra =

Bolivian footballer (born 1996)

Personal information
- Full name: Erwin Mario Saavedra Flores
- Date of birth: 22 February 1996 (age 30)
- Place of birth: Oruro, Bolivia
- Height: 1.73 m (5 ft 8 in)
- Position: Right midfielder

Team information
- Current team: Bolívar
- Number: 26

Youth career
- Bolívar

Senior career*
Years	Team	Apps	(Gls)
2013–2022	Bolívar	253	(47)
2017	→ Goiás (loan)	4	(0)
2022–2024	Mamelodi Sundowns	8	(0)
2024	→ Bolívar (loan)	9	(0)
2025–	Bolívar	21	(7)

International career^{‡}
2015	Bolivia U20	3	(0)
2015–	Bolivia	40	(4)
- * Club domestic league appearances and goals as of 30 December 2025 ‡ National team caps and goals as of 22:11,15 May 2025 (UTC)

Erwin Mario Saavedra Flores (born 22 February 1996) is a Bolivian professional footballer who plays for División Profesional club Bolívar and the Bolivia national team. Mainly a right midfielder, he can also play as a right-back.

== International career ==
Saavedra was summoned to the Bolivian U-20 team to play in the 2015 South American Youth Football Championship.

== Career statistics ==
As of 15 May 2025

=== Club ===
Appearances and goals by club, season and competition
Club	Season	League			Cup (Note: Includes Copa Aerosur and Copa Bolivia)		Continental (Note: Includes Copa Libertadores, Copa Sudamericana and CAF Champions League.)		Total	
Club	Season	Division	Apps	Goals	Apps	Goals	Apps	Goals	Apps	Goals
Bolívar	2013–14	Liga de Fútbol Profesional Boliviano	12	2	—		4	0	16	2
Bolívar	2014–15	Liga de Fútbol Profesional Boliviano	39	2	4	0	1	0	44	2
Bolívar	2015–16	Liga de Fútbol Profesional Boliviano	38	3	—		6	1	44	4
Bolívar	2016–17	Liga de Fútbol Profesional Boliviano	28	2	—		4	0	32	2
Bolívar	2018	Liga de Fútbol Profesional Boliviano	41	4	—		8	0	49	4
Bolívar	2019	Liga de Fútbol Profesional Boliviano	47	17	—		2	0	49	17
Bolívar	2020	Liga de Fútbol Profesional Boliviano	22	7	—		10	2	32	9
Bolívar	2021	Liga de Fútbol Profesional Boliviano	26	10	—		10	3	36	13
Bolívar	Total		253	47	4	0	45	6	302	53
Goiás (loan)	2017	Campeonato Brasileiro Série B	4	0	—		—		4	0
Mamelodi Sundowns	2021–22	South African Premiership	2	0	0	0	2	0	4	0
Mamelodi Sundowns	2022–23	South African Premiership	5	0	0	0	1	0	6	0
Mamelodi Sundowns	2024–25	South African Premiership	1	0	0	0	2	0	3	0
Mamelodi Sundowns	Total		8	0	0	0	5	0	13	0
Bolívar (loan)	2024	Liga de Fútbol Profesional Boliviano	9	0	—		4	0	13	0
Bolívar	2025	Liga de Fútbol Profesional Boliviano	4	2	1	0	3	0	8	2
Career total			278	49	5	0	57	6	340	55

=== International goals ===
Scores and results list Bolivia's goal tally first.

No.	Date	Venue	Opponent	Score	Result	Competition
1.	15 October 2019	Estadio Ramón Tahuichi Aguilera, Santa Cruz, Bolivia	Haiti	1–1	3–1	Friendly
2.	15 October 2019	Estadio Ramón Tahuichi Aguilera, Santa Cruz, Bolivia	Haiti	2–1	3–1	Friendly
3.	14 June 2021	Estádio Olímpico Pedro Ludovico, Goiânia, Brazil	Paraguay	1–0	1–3	2021 Copa América
4.	28 June 2021	Arena Pantanal, Cuiabá, Brazil	Argentina	1–3	1–4	2021 Copa América
