= Erwin Junior Sánchez =

Bolivian footballer (born 1992)

Personal information
- Full name: Erwin Junior Sánchez Paniagua
- Date of birth: 23 July 1992 (age 34)
- Place of birth: Lisbon, Portugal
- Height: 1.82 m (6 ft 0 in)
- Position: Midfielder

Team information
- Current team: San Antonio Bulo Bulo
- Number: 19

Senior career*
Years	Team	Apps	(Gls)
2015	Real Potosí	19	(2)
2016	Águeda	4	(0)
2018–2022	Blooming	130	(9)
2021	→ The Strongest (loan)	4	(0)
2023–2024	Oriente Petrolero	58	(0)
2025–	San Antonio Bulo Bulo	28	(2)

International career^{‡}
2015–	Bolivia	7	(0)
- * Club domestic league appearances and goals as of 30 December 2025 ‡ National team caps and goals as of 26 January 2022

Erwin Junior Sánchez Paniagua (born 23 July 1993) is a professional footballer who plays as a midfielder for Bolivian Primera División side San Antonio Bulo Bulo. Born in Portugal, he plays for the Bolivia national team.

== Club career ==
After becoming secondary school graduate, he decided to study a master's degree in International Business in the United States instead of practicing professional football. In 2015, after returning to Bolivia, he joined Real Potosí in the Bolivian Primera División.

== International career ==
In November 2015, Sánchez received his first call-up to the Bolivia senior team for the 2018 FIFA World Cup qualifiers against Venezuela and Paraguay.

== Personal life ==
He is the son of the former Bolivian international footballer Erwin "Platini" Sánchez. Born in Portugal when his father played for Boavista, he holds both Portuguese and Bolivian nationality.
