= Enrique Flores (footballer) =

Bolivian footballer (born 1994)

Personal information
- Full name: Jorge Enrique Flores Yrahory
- Date of birth: 1 February 1994 (age 32)
- Place of birth: Santa Cruz de la Sierra, Bolivia
- Height: 1.75 m (5 ft 9 in)
- Position: Left back

Team information
- Current team: Oriente Petrolero
- Number: 11

Senior career*
Years	Team	Apps	(Gls)
2010–2011	Real América		
2011–2015	Universitario de Sucre	119	(4)
2016–2020	Bolívar	65	(3)
2021–2023	Always Ready	62	(0)
2023–	Oriente Petrolero	31	(0)

International career^{‡}
2015–	Bolivia	16	(0)
- * Club domestic league appearances and goals as of 26 January 2022 ‡ National team caps and goals as of 7 June 2014

Jorge Enrique Flores Yrahory (born February 1, 1994) is a Bolivian footballer currently playing for Oriente Petrolero.
