= Arena Pantanal =

Stadium in Cuiabá, Brazil

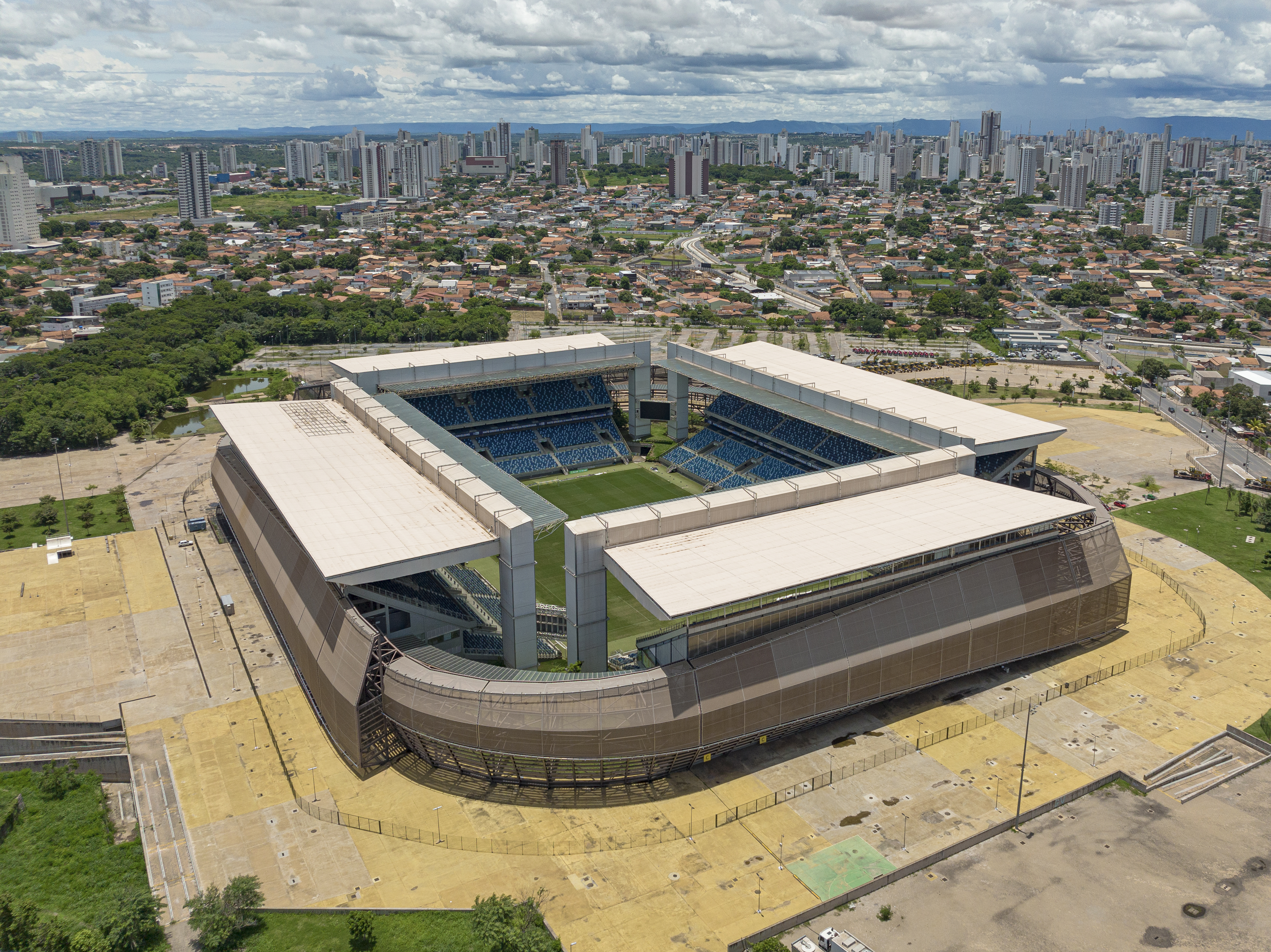
- Sisbrace
- Interactive map of Arena Pantanal
- Full name: Arena Pantanal
- Location: Rua Tracaia, Cuiabá, Mato Grosso, Brazil
- Owner: State of Mato Grosso
- Capacity: 42,788; 41,390 (World Cup)
- Executive suites: 97
- Field size: 105 x 68 m

Construction
- Groundbreaking: May 2010
- Opened: 2 April 2014
- Cost: R$ 646 million (US$ 293 million)

Tenants
- Cuiabá (2015–present); Mixto (2015–present); Sociedade Ação Futebol; Brazil national football team (selected matches)

Arena Pantanal is a multi-use stadium in Cuiabá, Brazil. It has been the home ground of Campeonato Brasileiro Série B club Cuiabá Esporte Clube since 2015. Completed on 26 April 2014, it is used mostly for football and hosted four group stage matches during the 2014 FIFA World Cup. During the World Cup, the arena had a capacity of 41,390, and currently can seat 42,788 spectators.

== History ==
Cuiabá was the smallest host city of the 2014 FIFA World Cup. Arena Pantanal was built on the site of the old Verdão stadium, which was demolished. The city's planned transportation improvements, including road expansions and rapid-transit projects, were not completed in time for the tournament.

Prior to its use for the 2014 FIFA World Cup, the venue received much criticism. It suffered a fire in October 2013, due to polystyrene insulation panels catching alight. Although nobody was injured, the fire came within 24 hours of the state governor of Mato Grosso warning that it may not be finished for the World Cup. On the day of its opening, on 2 April 2014, 5,000 seats were still to be installed in the stadium. Next to the stadium is the Ginásio Aecim Tocantins. A 2015 study of international media coverage of the tournament reported that, apart from the venues in and around Rio de Janeiro, the 2014 World Cup stadiums had no long-term plans for their use after the event. The stadium was built with public funds at a cost of R$646 million.

== Post–world cup use ==
In January 2015, the stadium was closed for urgent repairs after water leaks and damage to several of its systems. In the years after the tournament, Arena Pantanal was described as one of the 2014 World Cup's "white elephants", stadiums that lose money and depend on the national federation to schedule top-flight matches there. When Cuiabá Esporte Clube earned promotion to the Campeonato Brasileiro Série A for the first time in 2021, the stadium began hosting top-flight league matches regularly.

== International games hosted ==
Arena Pantanal hosted 4 games at the 2014 FIFA World Cup, all of them during the group stage phase of the tournament.

Date	Time (UTC−04)	Team 1	Result	Team 2	Round	Attendance
June 13, 2014	18:00	Chile	3–1	Australia	Group B	40,275
June 17, 2014	18:00	Russia	1–1	South Korea	Group H	37,603
June 21, 2014	18:00	Nigeria	1–0	Bosnia and Herzegovina	Group F	40,499
June 24, 2014	16:00	Japan	1–4	Colombia	Group C	40,340

Arena Pantanal was one of the five venues to host matches of the 2021 Copa América. The stadium hosted 5 group stage matches, these were played without spectators because of the COVID-19 pandemic.

Date	Time (UTC−04)	Team 1	Result	Team 2	Round	Attendance
June 13, 2021	20:00	Colombia	1–0	Ecuador	Group B	0
June 18, 2021	17:00	Chile	1–0	Bolivia	Group A	0
June 21, 2021	17:00	Uruguay	1–1	Chile	Group A	0
June 24, 2021	17:00	Bolivia	0–2	Uruguay	Group A	0
June 28, 2021	20:00	Bolivia	1–4	Argentina	Group A	0

== See also ==
- List of football stadiums in Brazil
- Lists of stadiums
