= Ángel Cardozo Lucena =

Paraguayan footballer (born 1994)

Personal information
- Full name: Ángel Rodrigo Cardozo Lucena
- Date of birth: 19 October 1994 (age 32)
- Place of birth: Asunción, Paraguay
- Height: 1.74 m (5 ft 9 in)
- Position: Midfielder

Team information
- Current team: Libertad
- Number: 15

Youth career
- 2010–2011: Libertad

Senior career*
Years	Team	Apps	(Gls)
2011–2013	Rubio Ñu	41	(0)
2013–2019	Libertad	128	(17)
2014	→ Rubio Ñu (loan)	16	(3)
2019–2023	Cerro Porteño	114	(9)
2023	→ Colón (loan)	10	(0)
2024–	Libertad	35	(1)

International career^{‡}
2012–2013	Paraguay U20	9	(1)
2015	Paraguay U22	3	(1)
2018–	Paraguay	17	(0)
2024	Paraguay Olympic (O.P.)	1	(0)
- * Club domestic league appearances and goals as of 12 August 2025 ‡ National team caps and goals as of 30 July 2024

Ángel Rodrigo "Piku" Cardozo Lucena (born 19 October 1994) is a Paraguayan professional footballer who plays as a midfielder for Club Libertad and the Paraguay national team.

== Career ==
Cardozo Lucena made his debut with Rubio Ñu on 19 September 2012 in a 1–1 draw against Sportivo Luqueño. He joined Libertad in 2013, and then returned to Rubio Ñu on a one-year loan in 2014. At the end of his stint at Libertad, he was excluded from the first team due to comments inciting his teammates to not sign contract extensions with the club.

On 3 July 2019, Cardozo Lucena joined rival Cerro Porteño. On 29 August 2023, he joined Argentine Primera División club Colón on a one-year loan with an option to join permanently. After getting relegated, on 5 February 2024 his contract was mutually terminated to alleviate the club finances.

Cardozo Lucena returned to Paraguay, rejoining Club Libertad on 6 February 2024, signing a one-year contract.

== Career statistics ==
As of 3 May 2024

Appearances and goals by club, season and competition
Club	Season	League			Cup		Continental (Note: Appearances in Copa Sudamericana and Copa Libertadores)		Other		Total	
Club	Season	Division	Apps	Goals	Apps	Goals	Apps	Goals	Apps	Goals	Apps	Goals
Rubio Ñu	2012	Paraguayan Primera División	13	0	—		—		—		13	0
Rubio Ñu	2013	Paraguayan Primera División	28	0	—		—		—		28	0
Rubio Ñu	Total		41	0	—		—		—		41	0
Libertad	2014	Paraguayan Primera División	3	0	—		—		—		3	0
Libertad	2015	Paraguayan Primera División	19	0	—		6	0	—		25	0
Libertad	2016	Paraguayan Primera División	32	2	—		2	0	—		34	2
Libertad	2017	Paraguayan Primera División	31	5	—		12	3	—		43	8
Libertad	2018	Paraguayan Primera División	31	5	—		7	0	—		38	5
Libertad	2019	Paraguayan Primera División	12	5	—		5	1	—		17	6
Libertad	Total		128	17	—		32	4	—		160	21
Rubio Ñu (loan)	2014	Paraguayan Primera División	16	3	—		—		—		16	3
Cerro Porteño	2019	Paraguayan Primera División	11	1	—		0	0	—		11	1
Cerro Porteño	2020	Paraguayan Primera División	27	6	—		4	0	—		31	6
Cerro Porteño	2021	Paraguayan Primera División	28	0	—		6	1	1 (Note: Appearance in Supercopa Paraguay)	0	35	1
Cerro Porteño	2022	Paraguayan Primera División	30	1	—		7	1	—		37	2
Cerro Porteño	2023	Paraguayan Primera División	18	1	1	0	8	0	—		27	1
Cerro Porteño	Total		114	9	1	0	25	2	1	0	141	11
Colón (loan)	2023	Argentine Primera División	10	0	0	0	—		—		10	0
Libertad	2024	Paraguayan Primera División	4	0	—		—		—		4	0
Career total			313	30	1	0	57	6	1	0	372	36
