= Alberto Espínola =

Paraguayan footballer (born 1991)

Personal information
- Full name: Alberto Espínola Giménez
- Date of birth: 8 February 1991 (age 35)
- Place of birth: Caazapá, Paraguay
- Height: 1.79 m (5 ft 10 in)
- Position: Right-back

Team information
- Current team: Sportivo Luqueño
- Number: 23

Senior career*
Years	Team	Apps	(Gls)
2012–2013	Rubio Ñu	21	(1)
2013	Sol de América	14	(1)
2013–2019	General Díaz	144	(10)
2019–2023	Cerro Porteño	118	(17)
2023–2024	Colón	7	(1)
2024–2025	Olimpia	11	(0)
2025–	Sportivo Luqueño	7	(0)

International career^{‡}
2020–	Paraguay	11	(0)
- * Club domestic league appearances and goals as of 13 August 2025 ‡ National team caps and goals as of 21:03, 25 March 2022 (UTC)

Alberto "Beto" Espínola Giménez (born 8 February 1991) is a Paraguayan professional footballer who plays as a right-back for Sportivo Luqueño and the Paraguay national team.

== Playing career ==
Espínola made his professional debut with Rubio Ñu in a 2–1 Paraguayan Primera División win over Guaraní on 11 February 2012. On 15 January 2019, Espínola signed with Cerro Porteño after a long stint with General Díaz.

== International career ==
Espínola debuted for the Paraguay national team in a 2–2 2022 World Cup qualification draw against Peru, assisting both his team's goals in his debut.
