= Nico González (footballer, born 1998) =

Argentine footballer (born 1998)

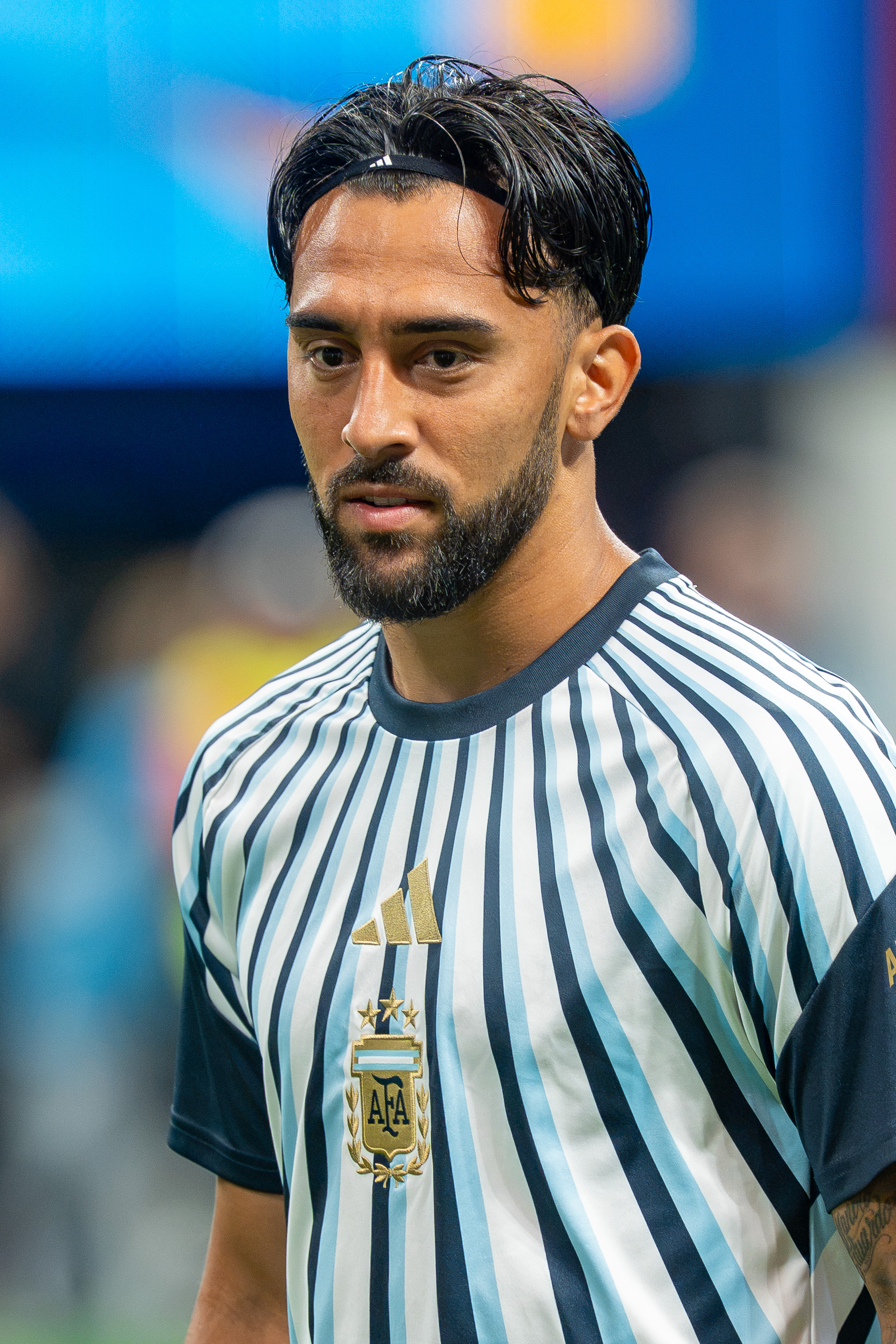
- González with Argentina in 2026

Personal information
- Full name: Nicolás Iván González
- Date of birth: 6 April 1998 (age 28)
- Place of birth: Escobar, Argentina
- Height: 1.80 m (5 ft 11 in)
- Position: Winger

Team information
- Current team: Juventus
- Number: 31

Youth career
- 2005–2016: Argentinos Juniors

Senior career*
Years	Team	Apps	(Gls)
2016–2018	Argentinos Juniors	44	(11)
2018–2021	VfB Stuttgart	72	(22)
2021–2025	Fiorentina	86	(25)
2024–2025	→ Juventus (loan)	26	(3)
2025–	Juventus	8	(1)
2025–2026	→ Atlético Madrid (loan)	24	(5)

International career^{‡}
2019	Argentina Olympic	3	(3)
2019–	Argentina	59	(6)
Medal record
Men's football
Representing Argentina
FIFA World Cup
Runner-up	2026 Canada–Mexico–US
Copa América
Winner	2021 Brazil
Winner	2024 United States
CONMEBOL–UEFA Cup of Champions
Winner	2022 England
- * Club domestic league appearances and goals as of 23:45, 18 October 2026 (UTC) ‡ National team caps and goals as of 3 October 2026

Nicolás Iván González (Spanish pronunciation: [nikoˈlas iˈβaŋ ɡonˈsales]; born 6 April 1998) is an Argentine professional footballer who plays as a winger for Serie A club Juventus and the Argentina national team.

== Club career ==
=== Argentinos Juniors ===
After over ten years in the club's youth system, González made his professional debut for Argentinos Juniors in a 2015–16 Copa Argentina defeat to Deportivo Laferrere of Primera C Metropolitana in July 2016. He made his Primera B Nacional debut on 28 August against San Martín prior to scoring the first of his four goals in 2016–17 on 23 April 2017, getting the winner against Atlético Paraná. In total, González made twenty appearances in 2016–17, a season which ended with Argentinos winning promotion to the Argentine Primera División. He scored on his first top-flight start, scoring the opening goal in a defeat to Belgrano.

=== VfB Stuttgart ===
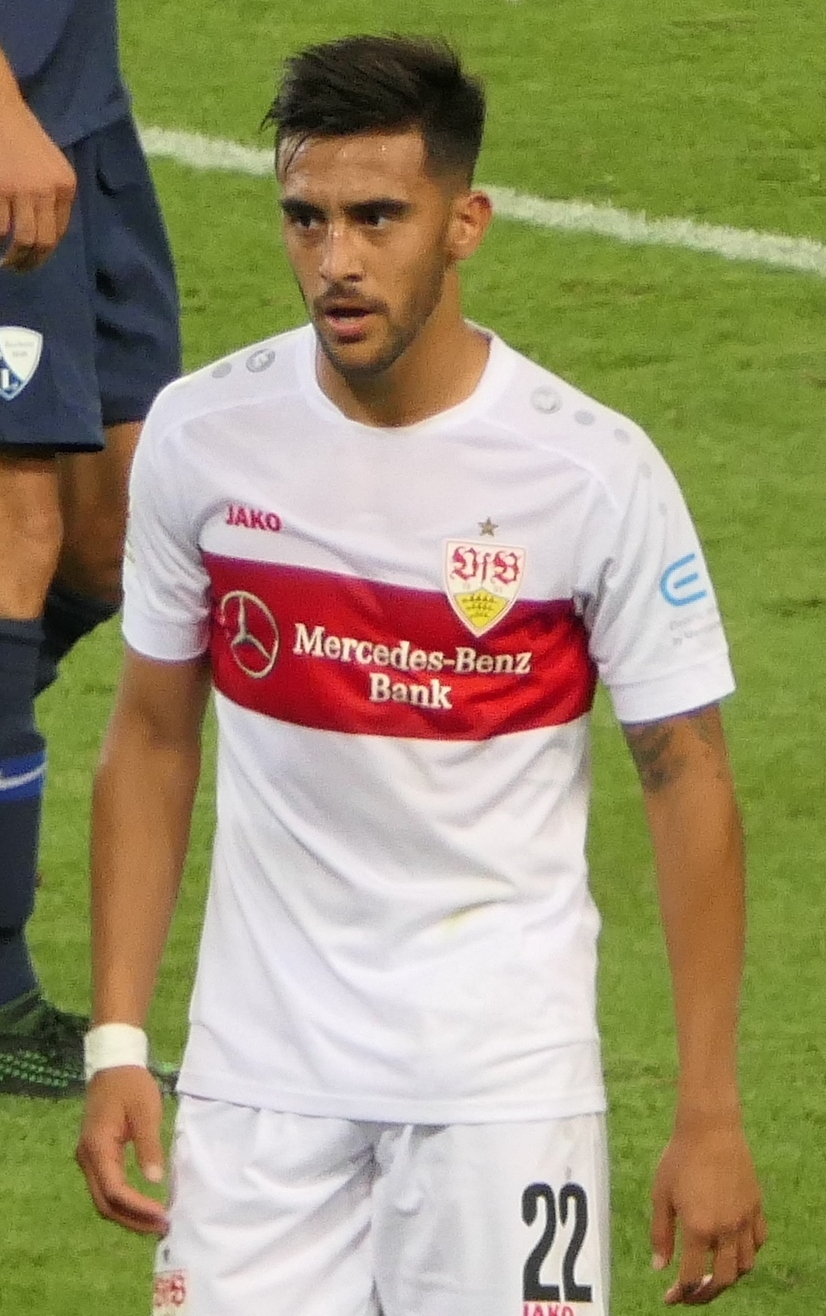
González with VfB Stuttgart in 2019

On 10 July 2018, González signed a five-year contract with VfB Stuttgart. He scored twice on his unofficial debut for the club, netting in a friendly victory over FV Illertissen on 18 July. His first competitive goal arrived during a home loss to Schalke 04 on 22 December. They were relegated at the end of 2018–19, with González subsequently scoring the winner on his 2. Bundesliga bow against FC St. Pauli on 17 August 2019. He scored consecutive braces in June 2020 against Sandhausen and Nürnberg, the latter of which was his 100th league appearance for Stuttgart.

On 25 November 2020, González extended his contract with VfB Stuttgart until June 2024.

=== Fiorentina ===
On 23 June 2021, González signed a five-year contract with Serie A club Fiorentina until 2026. On 13 August, González made his debut for Fiorentina in a 4–0 win against Serie B side Cosenza in the first round of Coppa Italia scoring the second goal in the 37th minute. On 18 May 2023, González scored a brace in Fiorentina's second leg UEFA Europa Conference League semi-final victory against Basel, sending his side to the final against West Ham United.

=== Juventus ===
On 25 August 2024, González joined Serie A club Juventus on a season-long loan with an obligation to buy. Juventus reported the transfer fees as €8 million for the 2024–25 season loan (with up to €0.4 million in additional costs), followed by the permanent transfer for €25 million, with an additional performance-based fees up to €5 million. The obligation to buy is conditional, but the conditions are highly likely to be triggered, thus Juventus accounted for the move as a permanent transfer.

A month later, on 17 September, he scored his first goal on his UEFA Champions League debut in a 3–1 win over PSV Eindhoven. In summer 2025, Juventus signed González permanently for a reported transfer fee of €28.1 million.

==== Loan to Atlético Madrid ====
On 1 September 2025, González joined La Liga club Atlético Madrid on an initial loan deal worth €1 million with an obligation to buy for €35 million depending on the number of games he plays for Atlético. He made his debut on 13 September in a league match against Villarreal CF, scoring a goal to help seal a 2–0 victory in his first appearance for the club.

== International career ==
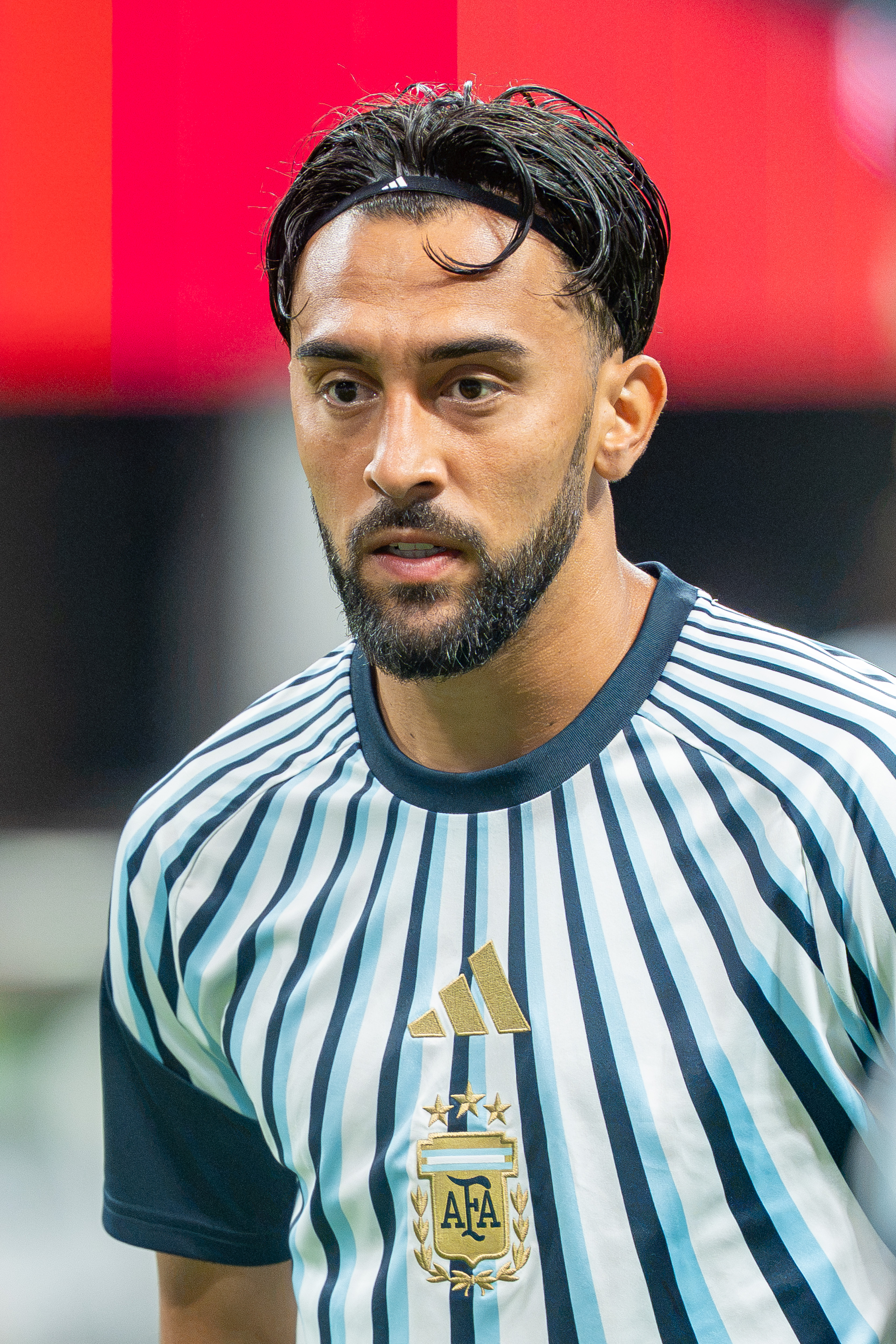
González during the 2026 FIFA World Cup

In July 2019, González received a call-up from the Argentina Olympic Team for said year's Pan American Games in Peru. After receiving a red card on his debut against Ecuador, he played again in the semi-final and the gold medal match when Argentina won the tournament. Months later, González was selected by Lionel Scaloni's senior team for the first time ahead of October friendly matches against Germany and Ecuador. He did not feature in the matchday squad against Germany, but appeared for his international bow during a 6–1 victory over Ecuador at the Estadio Manuel Martínez Valero in Elche on 13 October.

González scored his first goal for Argentina on 12 November 2020 in a 2022 FIFA World Cup qualifier against Paraguay that ended in a 1–1 draw. He netted again days later against the same opponent.

González was a member of the 2021 Copa América winning side, making five appearances in the tournament, four as a starter and one as substitute in the final against Brazil. He was also called up to Argentina's 2022 FIFA World Cup squad, but was forced to withdraw with a muscular injury three days before the start of the tournament, being replaced by Ángel Correa.

In June 2024, González was included in Lionel Scaloni's final 26-man Argentina squad for the 2024 Copa América. During the final against Colombia, González had to replace Lionel Messi after he suffered an ankle injury in the second half. 18 minutes after he entered the pitch he scored a goal, but it was ruled off.

On 27 May 2026, González was selected in the 26-man squad for the 2026 FIFA World Cup. During the tournament, he was primarily used as a substitute, making several impactful appearances off the bench as Argentina progressed to the final. In the final against Spain, he became the fifth player to make his first-ever FIFA World Cup start in a final, after Gyula Polgár, Jiří Tichý, Gustavo Dezotti and Christoph Kramer.

== Career statistics ==
=== Club ===
As of match played 22 October 2026

Appearances and goals by club, season and competition
Club	Season	League			National cup (Note: Includes Copa Argentina, DFB-Pokal, Coppa Italia, Copa del Rey)		Continental		Other		Total	
Club	Season	Division	Apps	Goals	Apps	Goals	Apps	Goals	Apps	Goals	Apps	Goals
Argentinos Juniors	2016–17	Primera B Nacional	20	4	2	0	—		0	0	22	4
Argentinos Juniors	2017–18	Argentine Primera División	24	7	1	0	—		0	0	25	7
Argentinos Juniors	Total		44	11	3	0	—		0	0	47	11
VfB Stuttgart	2018–19	Bundesliga	30	2	1	0	—		2 (Note: Appearances in Bundesliga relegation play-offs)	0	33	2
VfB Stuttgart	2019–20	2. Bundesliga	27	14	2	1	—		—		29	15
VfB Stuttgart	2020–21	Bundesliga	15	6	2	0	—		—		17	6
VfB Stuttgart	Total		72	22	5	1	—		2	0	79	23
Fiorentina	2021–22	Serie A	33	7	6	1	—		—		39	8
Fiorentina	2022–23	Serie A	24	6	5	2	13 (Note: Appearances in UEFA Europa Conference League)	6	—		42	14
Fiorentina	2023–24	Serie A	29	12	2	0	13	4	0	0	44	16
Fiorentina	Total		86	25	13	3	26	10	0	0	125	38
Juventus (loan)	2024–25	Serie A	26	3	2	1	6 (Note: Appearances in UEFA Champions League)	1	4 (Note: One appearance in Supercoppa Italiana, three appearances in FIFA Club World Cup)	0	38	5
Juventus	2025–26	Serie A	2	0	—		—		—		2	0
Juventus	2026–27	Serie A	6	1	0	0	3 (Note: Appearances in UEFA Europa League)	1	—		9	2
Juventus	Juventus total		34	4	2	1	9	2	4	0	49	7
Atlético Madrid (loan)	2025–26	La Liga	24	5	2	0	11	0	0	0	37	5
Career total			260	67	25	5	46	12	6	0	337	84

=== International ===
As of match played 3 October 2026

Appearances and goals by national team and year
National team	Year	Apps	Goals
Argentina	2019	3	0
Argentina	2020	2	2
Argentina	2021	10	0
Argentina	2022	6	1
Argentina	2023	9	2
Argentina	2024	11	1
Argentina	2025	7	0
Argentina	2026	11	0
Total		59	6

As of match played 10 September 2024.
Scores and results list Argentina's goal tally first, score column indicates score after each González goal.

List of international goals scored by Nico González
No.	Date	Venue	Cap	Opponent	Score	Result	Competition
1	12 November 2020	La Bombonera, Buenos Aires, Argentina	4	Paraguay	1–1	1–1	2022 FIFA World Cup qualification
2	17 November 2020	Estadio Nacional, Lima, Peru	5	Peru	1–0	2–0	2022 FIFA World Cup qualification
3	25 March 2022	La Bombonera, Buenos Aires, Argentina	18	Venezuela	1–0	3–0	2022 FIFA World Cup qualification
4	28 March 2023	Estadio Único Madre de Ciudades, Santiago del Estero, Argentina	22	Curaçao	2–0	7–0	Friendly
5	12 September 2023	Estadio Hernando Siles, La Paz, Bolivia	25	Bolivia	3–0	3–0	2026 FIFA World Cup qualification
6	10 September 2024	Estadio Metropolitano Roberto Meléndez, Barranquilla, Colombia	41	Colombia	1–1	1–2	2026 FIFA World Cup qualification

== Honours ==
Argentinos Juniors

- Primera B Nacional: 2016–17

Fiorentina

- Coppa Italia runner-up: 2022–23
- UEFA Europa Conference League runner-up: 2022–23, 2023–24

Atlético Madrid

- Copa del Rey runner-up: 2025–26

Argentina Olympic

- Pan American Games: 2019

Argentina

- Copa América: 2021, 2024
- CONMEBOL–UEFA Cup of Champions: 2022
- FIFA World Cup runner-up: 2026

Individual

- Bundesliga Rookie of the Month: January 2019
- UEFA Europa Conference League Team of the Season: 2022–23
