= 2024 FBF División Profesional =

División Profesional
- Season: 2024
- Dates: 16 February – 22 December 2024
- Champions: Bolívar (31st title)
- Relegated: Real Santa Cruz; Royal Pari (excluded)
- Copa Libertadores: San Antonio Bulo Bulo; Bolívar; The Strongest; Blooming
- Copa Sudamericana: Universitario de Vinto; Aurora; Nacional Potosí; GV San José
- Matches: 317
- Goals: 946 (2.98 per match)
- Top goalscorer: Apertura: Felipe Pasadore (12 goals); Clausura: Tommy Tobar (17 goals)
- Biggest home win: The Strongest 8–0 San Antonio (18 December)
- Biggest away win: Blooming 0–5 Bolívar (14 July)
- Highest scoring: Ind. Petrolero 3–7 Always Ready (17 December)

The 2024 FBF División Profesional was the 47th season of the División Profesional del Fútbol Boliviano, Bolivia's top-flight football league and the seventh season under División de Fútbol Profesional management. The season began on 16 February and ended on 22 December 2024.

Bolívar won their thirty-first league title in this season, after winning the Torneo Clausura and defeating the Torneo Apertura winners San Antonio Bulo Bulo 2–0 in the championship final. The Strongest were the defending champions.

== Format ==
The competition format was confirmed at the session of the División Profesional's Council held on 10 January 2024, in which it was decided that two tournaments (Apertura and Clausura) would be played in the season. In the Torneo Apertura, the 16 participating teams were divided into four groups of four teams each with a round of interzonal matches between derby rivals. The top two teams of each group advanced to a knockout stage, in which teams played quarter-finals, semi-finals, and finals. Both Apertura finalists were awarded international berths, with the winners qualifying for the 2025 Copa Libertadores group stage as Bolivia 1 and the runners-up claiming the Bolivia 1 berth for the 2025 Copa Sudamericana. The Torneo Clausura was a double round-robin competition, in which the 16 teams played each other twice for a total of 30 matches, with the top team at the end of those 30 rounds being declared as the winner and qualifying for the group stage of the Copa Libertadores as Bolivia 2.

It was also decided that both tournament winners would play a double-legged final series at the end of the season to decide the season champions, who also earned a monetary prize of one million USD awarded by CONMEBOL. The remaining international berths were awarded through an aggregate table including the Torneo Apertura's first stage and the Torneo Clausura, with the bottom-placed team in this table being relegated and the team placing second-from-bottom qualifying for a two-legged relegation play-off.

== Teams ==
16 teams competed in the league for the 2024 season: 14 of which took part in the 2023 Primera División, and two promoted from the 2023 Copa Simón Bolívar, GV San José and San Antonio Bulo Bulo. GV San José achieved a first-ever promotion to the top tier on 10 December 2023, after winning the title, and San Antonio also reached the first division for the first time six days later, after winning the promotion/relegation play-offs against Libertad Gran Mamoré.

Aside from Libertad Gran Mamoré, GV San José and San Antonio Bulo Bulo replaced Vaca Díez and Palmaflor del Trópico, both directly relegated.

=== Stadia and locations ===
Locations of the 2024 División Profesional teams.

Team	City	Stadium	Capacity
Always Ready	El Alto	Municipal de Villa Ingenio	22,000
Aurora	Cochabamba	Félix Capriles	32,000
Blooming	Santa Cruz de la Sierra	Ramón Tahuichi Aguilera	38,000
Bolívar	La Paz	Hernando Siles	42,000
Guabirá	Montero	Gilberto Parada	13,000
GV San José	Oruro	Jesús Bermúdez	33,000
Independiente Petrolero	Sucre	Olímpico Patria	30,700
Jorge Wilstermann	Cochabamba	Félix Capriles	32,000
Nacional Potosí	Potosí	Víctor Agustín Ugarte	32,105
Oriente Petrolero	Santa Cruz de la Sierra	Ramón Tahuichi Aguilera	38,000
Real Santa Cruz	Santa Cruz de la Sierra	Real Santa Cruz	14,000
Real Tomayapo	Tarija	IV Centenario	15,000
Royal Pari	Santa Cruz de la Sierra	Ramón Tahuichi Aguilera	38,000
San Antonio Bulo Bulo	Entre Ríos	Carlos Villegas	17,000
The Strongest	La Paz	Hernando Siles	42,000
Universitario de Vinto	Cochabamba	Félix Capriles (Note: Used along with Estadio Municipal de Quillacollo as home stadiums for the season since Universitario's stadium Estadio Hipólito Lazarte does not meet FBF requirements for a professional match.)	32,000

=== Personnel and kits ===
Team	Manager	Kit manufacturer	Main shirt sponsors
Always Ready	(Bolivia) Jaime Jemio	Marathon	UTB
Aurora	(Uruguay) Sergio Órteman	Marathon	UTB
Blooming	(Bolivia) Álvaro Peña	Marathon	Kia
Bolívar	(Argentina) Flavio Robatto	Puma	Suzuki
Guabirá	(Bolivia) Víctor Hugo Andrada	Forte	Celina, Ingenio Guabirá, Grupo Paz
GV San José	(Bolivia) Julio César Baldivieso	Arce	4life Grains, Paceña
Independiente Petrolero	(Argentina) Marcelo Robledo	Red White	UTB, Fancesa
Jorge Wilstermann	(Bolivia) Franz Taboada (caretaker)	Puma	Nacional, Campero
Nacional Potosí	(Bolivia) Dayler Gutiérrez (caretaker)	Forte	BCP, Ingenio San Silvestre
Oriente Petrolero	(Bolivia) Joaquín Monasterio	Marathon	Yango
Real Santa Cruz	(Bolivia) Armando Ibáñez	Arce	
Real Tomayapo	(Bolivia) Humberto Viviani	Oxígeno Wear	Altavida
Royal Pari	(Mexico) David de la Torre	Marathon	Grupo SION, Kalomai Park
San Antonio Bulo Bulo	(Bolivia) Leonardo Eguez	Oxígeno Wear	UTB
The Strongest	(Spain) Ismael Rescalvo	Marathon	
Universitario de Vinto	(Paraguay) Pablo Godoy	Oxígeno Wear	UTB

=== Managerial changes ===
Team	Outgoing manager	Manner of departure	Date of vacancy	Position in table	Incoming manager	Date of appointment
Torneo Apertura
Real Santa Cruz	(Argentina) Miguel Ángel Zahzú	End of contract	5 December 2023	Pre-season	(Bolivia) Cristian Farah	9 January 2024
The Strongest	(Bolivia) Pablo Cabanillas	Appointed as sporting director	13 December 2023	Pre-season	(Argentina) Pablo Lavallén	4 January 2024
Bolívar	(Bolivia) Vladimir Soria and (Bolivia) Wálter Flores	End of caretaker spell	18 December 2023	Pre-season	(Argentina) Flavio Robatto	5 January 2024
Real Tomayapo	(Argentina) Martín Brignani	End of contract	31 December 2023	Pre-season	(Argentina) Cristián Arán	9 January 2024
Nacional Potosí	(Argentina) Flavio Robatto	Resigned	3 January 2024	Pre-season	(Argentina) Claudio Biaggio	8 January 2024
GV San José	(Bolivia) Eduardo Villegas	Resigned	22 February 2024	3rd, Group D	(Bolivia) Richard Rojas (Note: Caretaker manager.)	28 February 2024
Oriente Petrolero	(Chile) Rodrigo Venegas	Sacked	23 February 2024	4th, Group D	(Bolivia) Víctor Hugo Antelo	23 February 2024
Jorge Wilstermann	(Argentina) Christian Díaz	Appointed as sporting director	8 March 2024	2nd, Group D	(Argentina) Gastón Ramondino	8 March 2024
GV San José	(Bolivia) Richard Rojas	End of caretaker spell	20 March 2024	4th, Group D	(Argentina) Rolando Carlen	20 March 2024
Always Ready	(Bolivia) Óscar Villegas	Return to the youth setup	30 March 2024	3rd, Group C	(Colombia) Flabio Torres	31 March 2024
Real Santa Cruz	(Bolivia) Cristian Farah	Resigned	9 April 2024	4th, Group A	(Argentina) Andrés Marinangeli	9 April 2024
Nacional Potosí	(Argentina) Claudio Biaggio	Sacked	18 April 2024	Quarter-finals	(Bolivia) Alberto Illanes	20 April 2024
Aurora	(Bolivia) Mauricio Soria	Sacked	18 April 2024	Quarter-finals	(Uruguay) Sergio Órteman	20 April 2024
The Strongest	(Argentina) Pablo Lavallén	Resigned	28 April 2024	Semi-finals	(Spain) Ismael Rescalvo	1 May 2024
Torneo Clausura
Real Tomayapo	(Argentina) Cristián Arán	Resigned	24 May 2024	12th	(Argentina) Gustavo Romanello	24 May 2024
Jorge Wilstermann	(Argentina) Gastón Ramondino	Resigned	2 June 2024	7th	(Bolivia) Eduardo Villegas (Note: Jorge Wilstermann had originally appointed Alejandro Russo as manager on 12 June 2024, but he left by mutual agreement on 8 July 2024 without managing the team in an official match.)	9 July 2024
Real Tomayapo	(Argentina) Gustavo Romanello	End of caretaker spell	4 June 2024	13th	(Argentina) Pablo Rubinich	11 June 2024
Oriente Petrolero	(Bolivia) Víctor Hugo Antelo	Sacked	10 June 2024	12th	(Bolivia) Joaquín Monasterio (Note: Originally as caretaker manager, appointed on a permanent basis on 4 July 2024.)	11 June 2024
Always Ready	(Colombia) Flabio Torres	Resigned	30 July 2024	5th	(Bolivia) Julio Quinteros	30 July 2024
Guabirá	(Bolivia) Humberto Viviani	Sacked	1 August 2024	15th	(Bolivia) Gualberto Mojica	1 August 2024
Nacional Potosí	(Bolivia) Alberto Illanes	Sacked	8 August 2024	15th	(Bolivia) Dayler Gutiérrez	8 August 2024
Nacional Potosí	(Bolivia) Dayler Gutiérrez	End of caretaker spell	11 August 2024	11th	(Colombia) Flabio Torres	11 August 2024
Royal Pari	(Mexico) David de la Torre	Sacked	12 August 2024	15th	(Colombia) Jaime de la Pava	15 August 2024
GV San José	(Argentina) Rolando Carlen	Resigned	12 August 2024	10th	(Bolivia) Julio César Baldivieso	15 August 2024
Real Santa Cruz	(Argentina) Andrés Marinangeli	Resigned	20 August 2024	16th	(Argentina) Marcelo Straccia	22 August 2024
Always Ready	(Bolivia) Julio Quinteros	End of caretaker spell	12 September 2024	8th	(Argentina) Facundo Biondi	12 September 2024
San Antonio Bulo Bulo	(Brazil) Thiago Leitão	Sacked	1 October 2024	12th	(Bolivia) Leonardo Eguez	4 October 2024
Royal Pari	(Colombia) Jaime de la Pava	Resigned	15 October 2024	15th	(Brazil) Thiago Leitão	16 October 2024
Blooming	(Argentina) Carlos Bustos	Mutual agreement	20 October 2024	8th	(Bolivia) Álvaro Peña	21 October 2024
Guabirá	(Bolivia) Gualberto Mojica	Resigned	27 October 2024	15th	(Bolivia) Víctor Hugo Andrada	28 October 2024
Always Ready	(Argentina) Facundo Biondi	Sacked	8 November 2024	8th	(Bolivia) Jaime Jemio	20 November 2024
Jorge Wilstermann	(Bolivia) Eduardo Villegas	Resigned	13 November 2024	7th	(Bolivia) Franz Taboada (Note: Caretaker manager until the end of the season.)	13 November 2024
Royal Pari	(Brazil) Thiago Leitão	Mutual agreement	26 November 2024	16th	(Mexico) David de la Torre	27 November 2024
Nacional Potosí	(Colombia) Flabio Torres	Sacked	28 November 2024	8th	(Bolivia) Dayler Gutiérrez	28 November 2024
Real Santa Cruz	(Argentina) Marcelo Straccia	Resigned	28 November 2024	16th	(Bolivia) Armando Ibáñez (Note: Yimi Gutiérrez was the caretaker manager for the Torneo Clausura 24th round match against Aurora.)	3 December 2024
Real Tomayapo	(Argentina) Pablo Rubinich	Resigned	2 December 2024	10th	(Bolivia) Humberto Viviani	3 December 2024

== Torneo Apertura ==
The Torneo Apertura, known as the 2024 Copa Paceña for sponsorship purposes, was the first tournament of the 2024 season. It began on 16 February and ended on 5 May 2024.

=== First stage ===
==== Group A ====
Pos	Team	Pld	W	D	L	GF	GA	GD	Pts	Qualification	STR	SAB	RTO	RSC
1	The Strongest	8	5	1	2	17	15	+2	16	Advance to Knockout stage	—	2–0	2–1	3–0
2	San Antonio Bulo Bulo	8	4	2	2	15	7	+8	14	Advance to Knockout stage	5–1	—	3–0	2–1
3	Real Tomayapo	8	3	2	3	10	12	−2	11		2–0	2–2	—	2–1
4	Real Santa Cruz	8	1	1	6	8	17	−9	4		2–3	0–3	1–2	—

Source: FBF, Soccerway
Legend: Blue = home team win; Yellow = draw; Red = away team win.
Rules for classification: 1) Points, 2) Goal difference, 3) Goals for, 4) Away goals for, 5) Yellow cards, 6) Red cards, 7) Drawing of lots.

==== Group B ====
Pos	Team	Pld	W	D	L	GF	GA	GD	Pts	Qualification	AUR	NAC	BLO	RPA
1	Aurora	8	4	2	2	14	7	+7	14	Advance to Knockout stage	—	4–1	4–2	4–1
2	Nacional Potosí	8	4	2	2	13	11	+2	14	Advance to Knockout stage	1–0	—	3–3	2–0
3	Blooming	8	4	2	2	12	12	0	14		1–0	2–1	—	0–2
4	Royal Pari	8	2	2	4	7	10	−3	8		0–0	0–1	1–2	—

Source: FBF, Soccerway
Legend: Blue = home team win; Yellow = draw; Red = away team win.
Rules for classification: 1) Points, 2) Goal difference, 3) Goals for, 4) Away goals for, 5) Yellow cards, 6) Red cards, 7) Drawing of lots.

==== Group C ====
Pos	Team	Pld	W	D	L	GF	GA	GD	Pts	Qualification	UVI	IPE	GUA	CAR
1	Universitario de Vinto	8	4	2	2	8	7	+1	14	Advance to Knockout stage	—	2–1	1–0	2–1
2	Independiente Petrolero	8	3	2	3	10	11	−1	11	Advance to Knockout stage	1–0	—	3–2	1–1
3	Guabirá	8	3	1	4	12	11	+1	10		3–1	2–1	—	3–1
4	Always Ready	8	1	3	4	6	10	−4	6		1–1	0–1	1–0	—

Source: FBF, Soccerway
Legend: Blue = home team win; Yellow = draw; Red = away team win.
Rules for classification: 1) Points, 2) Goal difference, 3) Goals for, 4) Away goals for, 5) Yellow cards, 6) Red cards, 7) Drawing of lots.

==== Group D ====
Pos	Team	Pld	W	D	L	GF	GA	GD	Pts	Qualification	BOL	GVS	ORI	WIL
1	Bolívar	8	5	1	2	19	13	+6	16	Advance to Knockout stage	—	3–1	4–2	2–1
2	GV San José	8	3	2	3	12	14	−2	11	Advance to Knockout stage	2–1	—	1–3	2–2
3	Oriente Petrolero	8	3	1	4	9	13	−4	10		0–2	1–0	—	2–1
4	Jorge Wilstermann	8	1	2	5	12	14	−2	5		1–2	3–4	3–0	—

Source: FBF, Soccerway
Legend: Blue = home team win; Yellow = draw; Red = away team win.
Rules for classification: 1) Points, 2) Goal difference, 3) Goals for, 4) Away goals for, 5) Yellow cards, 6) Red cards, 7) Drawing of lots.

==== Interseries matches ====
Teams played two additional first stage matches against a team from another group, in most cases their derby or regional rival. The interseries matches were played on the third and fifth rounds.

Round 3

Home	Score	Away
GV San José	1–0	Always Ready
Bolívar	4–4	The Strongest
Independiente Petrolero	1–1	Nacional Potosí
Aurora	1–0	Jorge Wilstermann
San Antonio Bulo Bulo	0–0	Universitario de Vinto
Blooming	2–1	Oriente Petrolero
Guabirá	1–2	Real Santa Cruz
Real Tomayapo	0–2	Royal Pari

Round 5

Home	Score	Away
Always Ready	1–1	GV San José
The Strongest	2–1	Bolívar
Nacional Potosí	3–1	Independiente Petrolero
Jorge Wilstermann	1–1	Aurora
Universitario de Vinto	1–0	San Antonio Bulo Bulo
Oriente Petrolero	0–0	Blooming
Real Santa Cruz	1–1	Guabirá
Royal Pari	1–1	Real Tomayapo

Source: FBF, Soccerway
Legend: Blue = home team win; Yellow = draw; Red = away team win.

=== Knockout stage ===
==== Bracket ====
Quarter-finals
Nacional Potosí	0	1	1
Universitario de Vinto	1	3	4
GV San José	0	1	1
The Strongest	2	2	4
San Antonio Bulo Bulo	1	1	2
Bolívar	0	1	1
Independiente Petrolero (p)	0	3	3 (5)
Aurora	1	2	3 (4)

Semi-finals
Universitario de Vinto (p)	0	2	2 (9)
The Strongest	1	1	2 (8)
San Antonio Bulo Bulo	6	1	7
Independiente Petrolero	1	3	4

Finals
Universitario de Vinto	1	1	2
San Antonio Bulo Bulo	2	1	3

==== Quarter-finals ====
Team 1	Agg.	Team 2	1st leg	2nd leg
GV San José	1–4	The Strongest	0–2	1–2
Nacional Potosí	1–4	Universitario de Vinto	0–1	1–3
Independiente Petrolero	3–3 (5–4 p)	Aurora	0–1	3–2
San Antonio Bulo Bulo	2–1	Bolívar	1–0	1–1

===== First leg =====
14 April 2024	San Antonio Bulo Bulo	1–0	Bolívar	Entre Ríos
15:00 UTC−4	Daniel Passira 26'	Report		Stadium: Carlos Villegas; Referee: Dilio Rodríguez

14 April 2024	GV San José	0–2	The Strongest	Oruro
17:30 UTC−4		Report	Triverio 66' (pen.); Sotomayor 90+1'	Stadium: Jesús Bermúdez; Referee: Jordy Alemán

14 April 2024	Nacional Potosí	0–1	Universitario de Vinto	Potosí
19:30 UTC−4		Report	Núñez 90+8'	Stadium: Víctor Agustín Ugarte; Referee: Bladimir Rueda

15 April 2024	Independiente Petrolero	0–1	Aurora	Sucre
19:00 UTC−4		Report	Serginho 90'	Stadium: Olímpico Patria; Referee: Javier Revollo

===== Second leg =====
17 April 2024	Universitario de Vinto	3–1 (4–1 agg.)	Nacional Potosí	Cochabamba
15:00 UTC−4	Núñez 63' (pen.), 90+14'; Cuéllar 90+1'	Report	García 68'	Stadium: Félix Capriles; Referee: Jordy Alemán

17 April 2024	The Strongest	2–1 (4–1 agg.)	GV San José	La Paz
20:00 UTC−4	Enoumba 19'; Cuéllar 77'	Report	Loza 39'	Stadium: Hernando Siles; Referee: Carlos García

18 April 2024	Bolívar	1–1 (1–2 agg.)	San Antonio Bulo Bulo	La Paz
19:00 UTC−4	Saucedo 90'	Report	Daniel Passira 34'	Stadium: Hernando Siles; Referee: Gery Vargas

18 April 2024	Aurora	2–3 (3–3 agg.) (4–5 p)	Independiente Petrolero	Cochabamba
20:00 UTC−4	Alaniz 34'; Reinoso 90'	Report	Gatti 41'; Godoy 59', 67'	Stadium: Félix Capriles; Referee: Guildo Quenta
	Penalties
	D. Torrico (penalty missed); Robles (penalty scored); Reinoso (penalty scored); Alaniz (penalty scored); J. Torrico (penalty scored); Sejas (penalty missed)		(penalty missed) Carabalí; (penalty scored) Ibars; (penalty scored) Hurtado; (penalty scored) Godoy; (penalty scored) Thomaz; (penalty scored) Soleto

==== Semi-finals ====
Team 1	Agg.	Team 2	1st leg	2nd leg
Universitario de Vinto	2–2 (9–8 p)	The Strongest	0–1	2–1
San Antonio Bulo Bulo	7–4	Independiente Petrolero	6–1	1–3

===== First leg =====
20 April 2024	Universitario de Vinto	0–1	The Strongest	Cochabamba
17:30 UTC−4		Report	Ursino 69' (pen.)	Stadium: Félix Capriles; Referee: Javier Revollo

22 April 2024	San Antonio Bulo Bulo	6–1	Independiente Petrolero	Entre Ríos
15:00 UTC−4	Mendoza 7', 51'; Pasadore 13', 81'; Daniel Passira 36', 90+3'	Report	Godoy 41' (pen.)	Stadium: Carlos Villegas; Referee: Juan Nelio García

===== Second leg =====
28 April 2024	The Strongest	1–2 (2–2 agg.) (8–9 p)	Universitario de Vinto	La Paz
16:00 UTC−4	Ortega 45+3'	Report	Tobar 19'; Magallanes 88'	Stadium: Hernando Siles; Referee: Ivo Méndez
	Penalties
	Angulo (penalty scored); Ursino (penalty scored); Caire (penalty missed); Ramallo (penalty scored); Quiroga (penalty scored); Cuéllar (penalty scored); Enoumba (penalty scored); Lino (penalty scored); Aimar (penalty scored); Viscarra (penalty missed)		(penalty scored) Llano; (penalty scored) Núñez; (penalty missed) Cano; (penalty scored) Giménez; (penalty scored) Tobar; (penalty scored) Magallanes; (penalty scored) Vila; (penalty scored) Calicho; (penalty scored) Almada; (penalty scored) Pinto

28 April 2024	Independiente Petrolero	3–1 (4–7 agg.)	San Antonio Bulo Bulo	Sucre
18:00 UTC−4	Ibars 30'; Cristaldo 37'; Godoy 70'	Report	Pasadore 15'	Stadium: Olímpico Patria; Referee: Bladimir Rueda

==== Finals ====
1 May 2024
15:00 UTC−4

Universitario de Vinto	1–2	San Antonio Bulo Bulo
Magallanes 74'	Report	Daniel Passira 34'; Pasadore 40'

Estadio Félix Capriles, Cochabamba
Referee: Juan Lara (Chile)

5 May 2024
15:00 UTC−4

San Antonio Bulo Bulo	1–1	Universitario de Vinto
Pasadore 15'	Report	Monteiro 73'

Estadio Dr. Carlos Villegas, Entre Ríos
Referee: José Cabero (Chile)

San Antonio Bulo Bulo won 3–2 on aggregate.

División de Fútbol Profesional
2024 Torneo Apertura winners

=== Top scorers ===
Rank	Player	Club	Goals
1	(Argentina) Felipe Pasadore	San Antonio Bulo Bulo	12
2	(Brazil) Daniel Passira	San Antonio Bulo Bulo	9
3	(Paraguay) Juan Godoy	Independiente Petrolero	7
4	(Brazil) Francisco da Costa	Bolívar	5
4	(Bolivia) Carlos Melgar	Guabirá	5
4	(Argentina) Ariel Nahuelpán	Jorge Wilstermann	5
4	(Bolivia) Fernando Saucedo	Bolívar	5
4	(Dominican Republic) Carlos Ventura	Oriente Petrolero	5
9	(Bolivia) Carmelo Algarañaz	Bolívar	4
9	(Argentina) Facundo Callejo	Nacional Potosí	4
9	(Bolivia) César Menacho	Blooming	4
9	(Colombia) Michael Ortega	The Strongest	4

Source: Soccerway

== Torneo Clausura ==
The Torneo Clausura, known as the 2024 Liga Tecno for sponsorship purposes, is the second and last tournament of the 2024 season. It began on 10 May and ended on 21 December 2024.

=== Standings ===
Pos	Team	Pld	W	D	L	GF	GA	GD	Pts	Qualification
1	Bolívar	30	20	7	3	76	25	+51	67	Advance to Championship final and qualification for Copa Libertadores group stage
2	The Strongest	30	18	6	6	62	34	+28	60	
3	GV San José	30	14	6	10	62	40	+22	48	
4	Aurora	30	12	12	6	49	40	+9	48	
5	Always Ready	30	13	7	10	48	37	+11	46	
6	Nacional Potosí	30	13	7	10	52	47	+5	46	
7	Blooming	30	13	6	11	36	43	−7	45	
8	Jorge Wilstermann	30	11	11	8	35	30	+5	44	
9	Real Tomayapo	30	13	4	13	41	41	0	43	
10	Independiente Petrolero	30	9	9	12	48	58	−10	36	
11	Oriente Petrolero	30	10	5	15	44	58	−14	35	
12	Universitario de Vinto	30	9	7	14	36	47	−11	34	
13	San Antonio Bulo Bulo	30	8	7	15	40	58	−18	31	
14	Guabirá	30	8	6	16	36	53	−17	30	
15	Royal Pari	30	7	8	15	30	46	−16	29	
16	Real Santa Cruz	30	6	4	20	30	68	−38	22	

Source: FBF, Soccerway
Rules for classification: 1) Points, 2) Goal difference, 3) Goals for, 4) Away goals for, 5) Yellow cards, 6) Red cards, 7) Drawing of lots.

División de Fútbol Profesional
2024 Torneo Clausura winners

=== Results ===
Home \ Away	CAR	AUR	BLO	BOL	GUA	GVS	IPE	WIL	NAC	ORI	RSC	RTO	RPA	SAB	STR	UVI
Always Ready	—	2–3	1–0	1–5	3–0	1–0	0–0	1–0	2–1	2–3	5–2	1–1	4–0	1–1	0–0	1–2
Aurora	1–0	—	1–0	1–1	2–1	2–1	2–0	0–0	1–1	3–1	7–1	0–0	0–3	2–3	1–0	1–2
Blooming	1–1	1–1	—	0–5	1–1	1–2	2–1	3–0	4–1	0–0	3–1	1–0	2–1	1–0	4–1	1–0
Bolívar	0–0	0–1	0–0	—	3–2	4–0	3–0	2–0	5–3	2–0	4–0	4–1	5–0	0–0	4–1	5–1
Guabirá	1–3	1–1	4–2	0–3	—	1–0	1–2	3–1	1–1	2–0	0–1	2–1	0–0	1–2	1–0	4–2
GV San José	0–1	2–2	6–0	3–2	5–0	—	2–2	0–0	2–1	2–0	4–0	5–0	3–0	2–0	5–2	4–1
Independiente Petrolero	3–7	2–1	5–1	0–1	0–0	0–1	—	2–2	3–3	3–2	3–0	2–1	2–2	3–3	0–2	3–2
Jorge Wilstermann	1–0	1–3	3–0	2–2	3–0	0–0	3–2	—	2–2	2–2	2–0	2–1	2–0	0–1	0–0	1–1
Nacional Potosí	1–2	1–3	4–2	2–1	3–0	2–1	2–0	0–0	—	4–1	1–0	1–0	2–1	3–1	1–1	1–2
Oriente Petrolero	2–1	5–0	0–1	1–4	2–1	4–2	1–1	1–0	2–2	—	1–3	4–2	0–0	0–2	0–1	2–1
Real Santa Cruz	2–1	2–2	0–1	2–3	0–1	2–3	0–2	0–2	2–4	0–1	—	1–5	1–1	1–0	1–2	1–1
Real Tomayapo	2–0	2–1	0–1	2–2	2–1	2–0	3–2	0–1	2–0	4–3	2–1	—	1–0	1–0	2–0	0–1
Royal Pari	0–2	1–1	2–1	0–1	3–3	3–1	2–2	0–1	2–0	2–1	0–2	0–2	—	1–0	1–2	0–0
San Antonio Bulo Bulo	3–3	3–3	0–1	1–3	3–2	3–3	3–1	1–2	2–3	1–2	2–3	1–1	0–3	—	0–3	2–1
The Strongest	1–0	1–1	1–1	1–1	3–2	3–2	5–0	2–1	2–1	6–2	4–0	2–0	3–1	8–0	—	1–0
Universitario de Vinto	1–2	2–2	1–0	0–1	1–0	1–1	1–2	1–1	0–1	4–1	1–1	2–1	2–1	0–2	2–4	—

Source: FBF, Soccerway
Legend: Blue = home team win; Yellow = draw; Red = away team win.

=== Top scorers ===
Rank	Player	Club	Goals
1	(Colombia) Tommy Tobar	Universitario de Vinto	17
2	(Bolivia) Gilbert Álvarez	Oriente Petrolero	15
2	(Paraguay) Juan Godoy	Independiente Petrolero	15
2	(Argentina) Brian Sobrero	GV San José	15
5	(Brazil) Daniel Passira	San Antonio Bulo Bulo	13
5	(Argentina) Agustín Graneros	Real Tomayapo	13
5	(Bolivia) Carlos Melgar	Guabirá / Bolívar	13
8	(Argentina) Martín Prost	Nacional Potosí	12
9	(Paraguay) Héctor Bobadilla	Jorge Wilstermann	11
9	(Bolivia) Roler Ferrufino	GV San José	11
9	(Brazil) Fábio Gomes	Bolívar	11
9	(Bolivia) César Menacho	Blooming	11
9	(Bolivia) Bruno Miranda	The Strongest	11
9	(Bolivia) Jair Reinoso	Aurora	11
9	(Bolivia) Robson Matheus	Always Ready	11

Source: Soccerway

== Championship final ==
Although the División Profesional's Council had decided prior to the start of the season that the championship final would be played as a two-legged series, on 12 December 2024 it was announced that, in order to end the season before Christmas as agreed under the original schedule, this final would be played as a single match instead. The match was played in Cochabamba on 22 December 2024.

22 December 2024
17:00 UTC−4

San Antonio Bulo Bulo	0–2	Bolívar
	Report	R. Vaca 45+1'; Gomes 88'

Estadio Félix Capriles, Cochabamba
Attendance: 13,000
Referee: Jordy Alemán

División de Fútbol Profesional
2024 champions

31st title

== Aggregate table ==
Pos	Team	Pld	W	D	L	GF	GA	GD	Pts	Qualification or relegation
1	Bolívar (C)	38	25	8	5	95	38	+57	83	Qualification for Copa Libertadores group stage (Note: San Antonio Bulo Bulo and Bolívar qualified for the Copa Libertadores group stage as 2024 Apertura and 2024 Clausura winners, respectively.)
2	The Strongest	38	23	7	8	79	49	+30	76	Qualification for Copa Libertadores second stage
3	Aurora	38	16	14	8	63	47	+16	62	Qualification for Copa Sudamericana first stage
4	Nacional Potosí	38	17	9	12	65	58	+7	60	Qualification for Copa Sudamericana first stage
5	GV San José	38	17	8	13	74	54	+20	59	Qualification for Copa Sudamericana first stage
6	Blooming	38	17	8	13	48	55	−7	59	Qualification for Copa Libertadores first stage (Note: For this season, it was decided that the Bolivia 4 berth to the Copa Libertadores would be the lowest international berth to be awarded due to financial considerations.)
7	Real Tomayapo	38	16	6	16	51	53	−2	54	
8	Always Ready	38	14	10	14	54	47	+7	52	
9	Jorge Wilstermann	38	12	13	13	47	44	+3	49	
10	Universitario de Vinto	38	13	9	16	44	54	−10	48	Qualification for Copa Sudamericana first stage (Note: Universitario de Vinto qualified for the Copa Sudamericana first stage as 2024 Apertura runners-up.)
11	Independiente Petrolero	38	12	11	15	58	69	−11	47	
12	San Antonio Bulo Bulo	38	12	9	17	55	65	−10	45	Qualification for Copa Libertadores group stage
13	Oriente Petrolero	38	13	6	19	53	71	−18	45	
14	Guabirá	38	11	7	20	48	64	−16	40	
15	Royal Pari (E, R)	38	9	10	19	37	56	−19	37	Qualification for Promotion/relegation play-off
16	Real Santa Cruz (R)	38	7	5	26	38	85	−47	26	Relegation to Bolivian Football Regional Leagues

Source: Paraelfutbol.com
Rules for classification: 1) Points, 2) Goal difference, 3) Goals for, 4) Away goals for, 5) Yellow cards, 6) Red cards, 7) Drawing of lots.
(C) Champions; (E) Excluded from the competition; (R) Relegated

== Promotion/relegation play-off ==
The relegation play-off was played by:

- Royal Pari (2024 División Profesional aggregate table 15th place)
- Real Oruro (2024 Copa Simón Bolívar runners-up)
21 December 2024
15:00 UTC−4

Royal Pari	4–0	Real Oruro
Gil 8'; Zurita 16'; Alves 23'; Moreno 59'	Report

Estadio Ramón Tahuichi Aguilera, Santa Cruz de la Sierra
Referee: Bruno Vera

23 December 2024
15:00 UTC−4

Real Oruro	Abandoned	Royal Pari
Bravo 9'; Pérez 34' (o.g.); G. Ribeiro 38'	Report

Estadio Jesús Bermúdez, Oruro
Referee: Gabriel Mendoza

The second leg was abandoned after 81 minutes of play with Real Oruro leading 3–0 as the Royal Pari players withdrew from the field. On 6 January 2025, the FBF's Sports Disciplinary Court (Tribunal de Disciplina Deportiva) ruled the exclusion of Royal Pari from the competition due to the events of the second leg match, meaning that Real Oruro promoted to the División Profesional and Royal Pari were relegated to the Santa Cruz Football Association Championship.
