= Joaquín Monasterio =

Bolivian footballer (born 1984)

Personal information
- Full name: Joaquín Antonio Monasterio Suárez
- Date of birth: 13 June 1984 (age 42)
- Place of birth: Santa Cruz de la Sierra, Bolivia
- Height: 1.82 m (6 ft 0 in)
- Position: Forward

Youth career
- Blooming

Senior career*
Years	Team	Apps	(Gls)
2004	Blooming		
2005–2006	Primero de Mayo		
2007	Sport Boys Warnes		
2008	Guabirá		

International career
2003	Bolivia U20		

Managerial career
- 2015–2020: Oriente Petrolero (youth)
- 2020: Vitória da Conquista
- 2021: Nacional Potosí (assistant)
- 2022: Universidad Cruceña
- 2023: Destroyers
- 2024: Oriente Petrolero (reserves)
- 2024–2025: Oriente Petrolero
- 2025: San Antonio Bulo Bulo
- 2025: The Strongest
- 2026: Guabirá
- * Club domestic league appearances and goals

Joaquín Antonio Monasterio Suárez (born 13 June 1984) is a Bolivian football manager and former player who played as a forward.

== Playing career ==
Born in Santa Cruz de la Sierra, Monasterio made his debut with Blooming, and subsequently represented Primero de Mayo, Sport Boys Warnes and Guabirá. He also played for the Bolivia national under-20 team.

== Managerial career ==
Monasterio began his career in 2015, as manager of the youth sides of Oriente Petrolero. On 16 August 2020, he moved to Brazil and was named head coach of Vitória da Conquista.

On 15 October 2020, Monasterio left Vitória da Conquista after failing to acquire a work permit; he was unable to coach the club in official matches. He joined Flavio Robatto's staff at Nacional Potosí the following April, before being named manager of Universidad Cruceña for the 2022 season.

On 10 April 2023, Monasterio was announced as manager of Destroyers. In February 2024, he returned to Oriente as manager of the reserve squad, before becoming an interim in the main squad on 11 June; on 4 July, he was confirmed as first team manager for the remainder of the year.

On 4 March 2025, Monasterio was sacked by Oriente after a poor start of the year. Eighteen days later, he was named at the helm of San Antonio Bulo Bulo, but was also dismissed on 8 June.

On 11 July 2025, Monasterio took over The Strongest. On 11 December, however, he resigned, and was named at the helm of fellow top-tier side Guabirá eight days later.

On 8 March 2026, Monasterio left Guabirá by mutual consent.
