= Gabriel Sotomayor =

Bolivian association football player

Personal information
- Full name: Gabriel Agustín Sotomayor Cardozo
- Date of birth: 2 July 1999 (age 27)
- Place of birth: Yacuiba, Bolivia
- Height: 1.75 m (5 ft 9 in)
- Position: Winger

Team information
- Current team: The Strongest
- Number: 10

Youth career
- Petrolero
- 2017–2019: The Strongest

Senior career*
| Years | Team | Apps | (Gls) |
| 2019– | The Strongest | 100 | (26) |
| 2025 | → Floriana (loan) | 10 | (1) |

International career^{‡}
| 2024– | Bolivia | 1 | (0) |
- * Club domestic league appearances and goals as of 30 December 2025 ‡ National team caps and goals as of 13:35, 24 March 2025 (UTC)

Gabriel Agustín Sotomayor Cardozo (born 2 July 1999) is a Bolivian footballer who plays as a winger for Bolivian Primera División club The Strongest.

He began his senior career at The Strongest, where he won the Bolivian Primera División in 2023. He was loaned to Floriana of the Maltese Premier League in 2025. He made his senior international debut for Bolivia in 2024.

== Club career ==
Born in Yacuiba in Tarija Department, Sotomayor was a youth player at Petrolero de Yacuiba and arrived at The Strongest in 2017. Two years later, he was promoted to the first team by manager Pablo Escobar.

Sotomayor made his debut in Escobar's first match, a 2–1 home win over Aurora on 19 January 2019 in the first game of the Bolivian Primera División season. He played 9 games and scored 4 goals that campaign, starting with two in a 4–0 win at Nacional Potosí on 1 December; his goals came over three consecutive games in December.

After playing only 11 games and scoring twice in the following two years, Sotomayor extended his contract in January 2022 to last until 2024. In the 2023 season, he scored seven goals in 24 games as his team won the title. His contract was renewed for 2024.

In January 2025, Sotomayor signed for Floriana in the Maltese Premier League, after a transfer that was held up by visa issues. His compatriot César Menacho also moved to the Mediterranean island, joining Hamrun Spartans. He made his debut on 6 February in the last 16 of the Maltese FA Trophy, scoring in a 4–1 win away to Victoria Hotspurs. He totalled 13 games, two goals and one assist in 470 minutes of play in Malta.

Sotomayor returned to The Strongest on 11 June 2025, after his loan was not renewed.

== International career ==
In May 2024, Sotomayor had his first call-up to the Bolivia national team by manager Antônio Carlos Zago, ahead of a friendly match against Mexico in Chicago. He made his debut on 14 November in a 2026 FIFA World Cup qualifier away to Ecuador, as a half-time substitute for Menacho in a 4–0 loss for a much-changed team under new coach Óscar Villegas.

== Career statistics ==
=== Club ===
As of match played 23 August 2025

Appearances and goals by club, season and competition
| Club | Season | League | | | National cup (Note: Includes Copa Bolivia, Maltese FA Trophy) | | Continental | | Total | |
| Club | Season | Division | Apps | Goals | Apps | Goals | Apps | Goals | Apps | Goals |
|---|---|---|---|---|---|---|---|---|---|---|
| The Strongest | 2019 | Bolivian Primera División | 9 | 4 | — | | — | | 9 | 4 |
| The Strongest | 2020 | Bolivian Primera División | 6 | 0 | — | | 0 | 0 | 6 | 0 |
| The Strongest | 2021 | Bolivian Primera División | 5 | 2 | — | | 0 | 0 | 5 | 2 |
| The Strongest | 2022 | Bolivian Primera División | 25 | 4 | — | | 2 (Note: One appearance in Copa Libertadores, one appearance in Copa Sudamericana) | 0 | 27 | 4 |
| The Strongest | 2023 | Bolivian Primera División | 24 | 7 | 6 | 2 | 3 (Note: Appearance(s) in Copa Libertadores) | 0 | 33 | 9 |
| The Strongest | 2024 | Bolivian Primera División | 18 | 6 | 0 | 0 | 3 | 0 | 21 | 6 |
| The Strongest | Total | | 87 | 23 | 6 | 2 | 8 | 0 | 101 | 25 |
| Floriana | 2024–25 | Maltese Premier League | 10 | 1 | 3 | 1 | — | | 13 | 2 |
| Floriana | 2025–26 | Maltese Premier League | 0 | 0 | 0 | 0 | 0 | 0 | 0 | 0 |
| Floriana | Total | | 10 | 1 | 3 | 1 | 0 | 0 | 13 | 2 |
| The Strongest | 2025 | Bolivian Primera División | 6 | 2 | 3 | 0 | — | | 9 | 2 |
| Career total | | | 103 | 26 | 12 | 3 | 8 | 0 | 123 | 29 |

=== International ===
As of match played 15 November 2024

| National team | Year | Apps | Goals |
|---|---|---|---|
| Bolivia | 2024 | 1 | 0 |
| Total | | 1 | 0 |
