= Daniel Passira =

Brazilian footballer (born 1996)

Personal information
- Full name: Daniel Floro da Silva
- Date of birth: 1 June 1996 (age 30)
- Place of birth: Passira, Brazil
- Height: 1.83 m (6 ft 0 in)
- Position: Forward

Team information
- Current team: Hong Linh Ha Tinh
- Number: 9

Youth career
- Vitória das Tabocas
- 2014–2016: Central

Senior career*
| Years | Team | Apps | (Gls) |
| 2016 | Central | 1 | (0) |
| 2018 | Centro Limoeirense | 12 | (7) |
| 2019–2021 | Salgueiro | 23 | (3) |
| 2019 | → Mixto (loan) | 0 | (0) |
| 2021 | → Caucaia (loan) | 0 | (0) |
| 2021 | → Guarany de Sobral (loan) | 17 | (6) |
| 2021 | Treze | 0 | (0) |
| 2022 | URT | 8 | (0) |
| 2022 | Pacajus | 12 | (6) |
| 2023 | Campinense | 5 | (1) |
| 2023 | Nacional-AM | 4 | (1) |
| 2023–2024 | Maranhão | 25 | (6) |
| 2024–2025 | San Antonio Bulo Bulo | 40 | (22) |
| 2025–2026 | Hanoi FC | 38 | (15) |
| 2026– | Hong Linh Ha Tinh | 6 | (5) |
- * Club domestic league appearances and goals as of 30 October 2026

Daniel Floro da Silva (born 1 June 1996), known as Daniel Passira, is a Brazilian professional footballer who plays as a forward for V.League 1 club Hong Linh Ha Tinh.

== Career ==
Nicknamed after his hometown, Passira (in the state of Pernambuco), Daniel played for Vitória das Tabocas and Central as a youth, but after receiving little first team opportunities at the latter, he opted to leave at the age of 19. He then went on to play amateur football while working in farms, before being invited to play in the Campeonato Pernambucano Série A2 for Centro Limoeirense.

After impressing with Centro by scoring seven goals in 12 appearances, Daniel Passira moved to Salgueiro for the 2019 season. Unable to establish himself as a regular starter for the club, he served loan stints at Mixto, Caucaia and Guarany de Sobral.

On 7 October 2021, Daniel Passira was announced at Treze, but did not feature in any matches, and signed with URT on 2 December. After nine goalless matches, he moved to Pacajus in the Série D.

After being Pacajus' top scorer with six goals, Daniel Passira agreed to a contract with Série C side Campinense on 4 July 2022, but the deal fell through three days later, as he already played for two clubs in national competitions during the season. Back to Pacajus, he helped the side to win the year's Copa Fares Lopes before being announced at Campinense on 12 November.

On 10 March 2023, Daniel Passira moved to Nacional-AM, but featured rarely and signed for Maranhão in April. On 11 February of the following year, he left the latter club to join Bolivian Primera División side San Antonio Bulo Bulo, managed by compatriot Thiago Leitão.

On 11 January 2025, Passira joined V.League 1 side Hanoi FC.

On 7 August 2026, Passira was transferred to league fellow Hong Linh Ha Tinh.

== Career statistics ==
As of 23 July 2024

Appearances and goals by club, season and competition
| Club | Season | League | | | State league | | Cup | | Continental | | Other | | Total | |
| Club | Season | Division | Apps | Goals | Apps | Goals | Apps | Goals | Apps | Goals | Apps | Goals | Apps | Goals |
|---|---|---|---|---|---|---|---|---|---|---|---|---|---|---|
| Central | 2016 | Pernambucano | — | | 1 | 0 | — | | — | | — | | 1 | 0 |
| Centro Limoeirense | 2018 | Pernambucano Série A2 | — | | 12 | 7 | — | | — | | — | | 12 | 7 |
| Salgueiro | 2019 | Série D | 0 | 0 | 2 | 0 | — | | — | | 1 (Note: Appearance(s) in Copa do Nordeste) | 0 | 3 | 0 |
| Salgueiro | 2020 | Série D | 14 | 3 | 4 | 0 | — | | — | | — | | 18 | 3 |
| Salgueiro | 2021 | Pernambucano | — | | 3 | 0 | 1 | 0 | — | | 5 | 0 | 9 | 0 |
| Salgueiro | Total | | 14 | 3 | 9 | 0 | 1 | 0 | — | | 6 | 0 | 30 | 3 |
| Mixto (loan) | 2019 | Mato-Grossense | — | | — | | — | | — | | 1 (Note: Appearance(s) in Copa FMF) | 0 | 1 | 0 |
| Caucaia (loan) | 2020 | Cearense | — | | — | | — | | — | | 6 (Note: Appearance(s) in Copa Fares Lopes) | 3 | 6 | 3 |
| Guarany de Sobral (loan) | 2021 | Série D | 17 | 6 | — | | — | | — | | — | | 17 | 6 |
| URT | 2022 | Série D | 0 | 0 | 8 | 0 | 1 | 0 | — | | — | | 9 | 0 |
| Pacajus | 2022 | Série D | 12 | 6 | — | | — | | — | | 7 | 0 | 19 | 6 |
| Campinense | 2023 | Série D | 0 | 0 | 5 | 1 | 0 | 0 | — | | 6 | 1 | 11 | 2 |
| Nacional-AM | 2023 | Série D | 0 | 0 | 4 | 1 | — | | — | | — | | 4 | 1 |
| Maranhão | 2023 | Série D | 19 | 4 | — | | — | | — | | — | | 19 | 4 |
| Maranhão | 2024 | Série D | 0 | 0 | 6 | 2 | 0 | 0 | — | | 1 | 0 | 7 | 2 |
| Maranhão | Total | | 19 | 4 | 6 | 2 | 0 | 0 | — | | 1 | 0 | 26 | 6 |
| San Antonio Bulo Bulo | 2024 | Bolivian Primera División | 19 | 10 | — | | 0 | 0 | — | | — | | 19 | 10 |
| Career total | | | 81 | 29 | 45 | 11 | 2 | 0 | 0 | 0 | 27 | 4 | 155 | 44 |

== Honours ==
Salgueiro

- Campeonato Pernambucano: 2020

Pacajus

- Copa Fares Lopes: 2022
