= Dayler Gutiérrez =

Bolivian footballer (born 1984)

Personal information
- Full name: José Dayler Gutiérrez Solares
- Date of birth: 6 April 1980 (age 46)
- Place of birth: Potosí, Bolivia
- Position: Defender

Team information
- Current team: Nacional Potosí (manager)

Youth career
- Real Potosí

Senior career*
Years	Team	Apps	(Gls)
1997–2005	Real Potosí	264	(4)
2006	San José	9	(0)
2007	Universitario de Potosí		

Managerial career
- 2012–2015: Stormers
- 2015: Universitario de Sucre (youth)
- 2016–2017: Stormers
- 2017–2018: Universitario de Sucre (assistant)
- 2017: Universitario de Sucre (interim)
- 2019: Stormers
- 2020: Stormers San Lorenzo
- 2021: Universitario de Sucre (youth)
- 2021: Mojocoya
- 2022–2025: Nacional Potosí (assistant)
- 2024: Nacional Potosí (interim)
- 2024: Nacional Potosí (interim)
- 2025: Nacional Potosí
- 2025: Real Potosí
- 2026–: Nacional Potosí
- * Club domestic league appearances and goals

José Dayler Gutiérrez Solares (born 6 April 1980) is a Bolivian football manager and former player who played as a defender. He is the current manager of Nacional Potosí.

== Playing career ==
Born in Potosí, Gutiérrez began his career with hometown side Real Potosí, helping the club to reach the Copa Libertadores for the first time ever in 2002. He left the club in the end of 2005, and subsequently played for San José and Universitario de Potosí.

== Managerial career ==
After retiring, Gutiérrez was named manager of Stormers in January 2012. He moved to Universitario de Sucre in June 2015, taking over the under-18 squad.

Gutiérrez returned to Stormers in 2016, before switching back to Universitario in the following year, as an assistant. In October 2017, he was named interim manager of the side after the departure of Edgardo Malvestiti.

Gutiérrez continued to work as an assistant after the arrival of Óscar Sanz, before returning to Stormers in 2019. In the following year, he was in charge of Stormers San Lorenzo.

Back to Universitario in 2021, Gutiérrez only spent two months in charge of the youth sides before taking over Mojocoya in March of that year. He left the club in October after having altercations with the board, and moved to Nacional Potosí in 2022, as an assistant.

Gutiérrez was an interim manager of Nacional on two occasions in 2024: the first in August, after Alberto Illanes was sacked, and the second in November, after the departure of Flabio Torres. On 30 May 2025, he was appointed permanent manager of the side, replacing César Vigevani, but was himself dismissed on 24 July.
