= Felipe Pasadore =

Argentine footballer

Personal information
- Date of birth: 19 July 2000 (age 26)
- Place of birth: Rosario, Argentina
- Height: 1.80 m (5 ft 11 in)
- Position: Forward

Team information
- Current team: Cuiabá
- Number: 16

Youth career
- Río Negro
- Tiro Federal

Senior career*
| Years | Team | Apps | (Gls) |
| 2021–2022 | Belgrano | 0 | (0) |
| 2023–2024 | San Antonio Bulo Bulo | 37 | (27) |
| 2024 | Schaffhausen | 8 | (5) |
| 2025 | Sportivo Luqueño | 8 | (0) |
| 2025– | Cuiabá | 5 | (0) |
- * Club domestic league appearances and goals as of 17 December 2025

Felipe Pasadore (born 19 July 2000) is an Argentine professional footballer who plays as a forward for Campeonato Brasileiro Série B club Cuiabá.

== Career ==
Born in Rosario, Santa Fe, Pasadore played for hometown sides CSDyC Río Negro and Tiro Federal, before moving to the reserve sides of Belgrano in 2021. In November 2022, after being released by the latter club, he posted his highlights on a Facebook group, seeking for a new side.

On 4 March 2023, Pasadore was announced at Bolivian club San Antonio Bulo Bulo for the Copa Simón Bolívar. He became the club's top scorer in their promotion campaign with 13 goals, before renewing his contract for another year on 3 January 2024.

Pasadore started the 2024 season impressing: on his first professional match on 20 February 2024, he scored twice in a 2–2 away draw against Real Tomayapo. Eight days later, he scored a hat-trick in a 5–1 home routing of The Strongest.

Pasadore was the top scorer of the 2024 Apertura tournament with 12 goals, being a key unit as the club won the competition and qualified to the Copa Libertadores for the first time ever. He left the club in June 2024, after his contract expired.

On 9 September 2024, Pasadore signed with Schaffhausen in Switzerland.

== Career statistics ==
As of 11 November 2025

Appearances and goals by club, season and competition
| Club | Season | League | | | Cup | | Continental | | Total | |
| Club | Season | Division | Apps | Goals | Apps | Goals | Apps | Goals | Apps | Goals |
|---|---|---|---|---|---|---|---|---|---|---|
| San Antonio Bulo Bulo | 2023 | Copa Simón Bolívar | 19 | 13 | — | | — | | 19 | 13 |
| San Antonio Bulo Bulo | 2024 | Bolivian Primera División | 18 | 14 | 0 | 0 | — | | 18 | 14 |
| San Antonio Bulo Bulo | Total | | 37 | 27 | 0 | 0 | — | | 37 | 27 |
| Schaffhausen | 2024–25 | Swiss Challenge League | 8 | 5 | 1 | 0 | — | | 9 | 5 |
| Sportivo Luqueño | 2025 | Paraguayan Primera División | 8 | 0 | — | | 1 (Note: Appearance(s) in Copa Libertadores) | 0 | 9 | 0 |
| Cuiabá | 2025 | Série B | 4 | 0 | — | | — | | 4 | 0 |
| Career total | | | 57 | 32 | 1 | 0 | 1 | 0 | 59 | 32 |
