= Luis Rodríguez (Bolivian footballer) =

Bolivian footballer (born 1994)

Personal information
- Full name: Luis Francisco Rodríguez Zegada
- Date of birth: 22 August 1994 (age 32)
- Place of birth: Bolivia
- Height: 1.73 m (5 ft 8 in)
- Position: Left back

Team information
- Current team: Indep. Petrolero
- Number: 4

Senior career*
Years	Team	Apps	(Gls)
2012–2013	Wilstermann	4	(0)
2013–2014	Aurora	19	(0)
2014–2016	Bolívar	36	(2)
2016–2017	Oriente Petrolero	45	(0)
2018	The Strongest	5	(0)
2019	Royal Pari	2	(0)
2019	Always Ready	13	(0)
2020	Nacional Potosi	19	(1)
2021	Oriente Petrolero	21	(1)
2022–2025	Wilstermann	73	(1)
2026–	Indep. Petrolero	1	(0)
- * Club domestic league appearances and goals as of 30 December 2025

Luis Francisco Rodríguez Zegada (born 22 August 1994 in Bolivia) is a Bolivian footballer who plays as a left back for Wilstermann.

In his career Rodriguez Zegada has played for three clubs in the Liga de Fútbol Profesional Boliviano. These clubs include Wilstermann, Aurora and his current club Bolívar.
