= Juan Godoy (footballer) =

Bolivian association football player (born 1993)

Personal information
- Full name: Juan Sinforiano Godoy Viñales
- Date of birth: 23 June 1993 (age 33)
- Place of birth: Carayaó, Paraguay
- Position: Forward

Team information
- Current team: Club Always Ready

Youth career
- San Luis
- Independiente de Campo Grande

Senior career*
Years	Team	Apps	(Gls)
- Martín Ledesma
2018	Club Deportivo Guabirá	0	(0)
2021-2024	Independiente Petrolero	115	(31)
2022	→ Club Deportivo Guabirá (loan)	11	(2)
2025	The Strongest	25	(11)
2026–	Club Always Ready	6	(1)

International career^{‡}
2026–	Bolivia	4	(1)
- * Club domestic league appearances and goals as of 00:15 (UTC) 27 May 2026 ‡ National team caps and goals as of 31 March 2026

Juan Sinforiano Godoy Viñales (born 23 June 1993) is a Bolivian professional footballer who plays as a forward for Club Always Ready and the Bolivia national football team. Born in Paraguay, he became a Bolivian citizen in 2024.

== Early life ==
Born in Paraguay, Godoy was born in Carayaó, but grew up in Yasy Cañy. He started playing football there at San Luis, a club in the Yasy Cañy League. He also played with Independiente de Campo Grande at the under-18 and under-20 level before joining Martín Ledesma in Capiatá.

== Club career ==
Having played in Paraguay for Martín Ledesma, a club in the lower division, he moved to Bolivia in 2018 to play for Club Deportivo Guabirá. However, due to limits on foreign players he moved on and had his first success with Independiente Petrolero, with whom he won the Bolivian league title in the 2021 season. In the final match of that campaign, he scored the winning goal in a 3–2 victory over Guabirá. In 2022 he had a half-season spell playing on loan for Guabirá.

Playing for The Strongest in August 2025, he suffered burns to his thigh and testicles after being hit by a firework on the pitch after celebrating the winning goal in a 3–2 win over Club Blooming. Having scored 11 goals in 25 matches. Godoy joined Club Always Ready in January 2026.

== International career ==
In January 2026, he was called up for the first time to the Bolivian national football team by coach Óscar Villegas. He made his debut that same month against Mexico in a friendly match that ended in a 1–0 defeat for Bolivia on 25 January 2026. He scored his first international goal for Bolivia in the friendly match against Trinidad and Tobago on 15 March 2026, in a 3–0 win.

Playing as a second-half substitute on 25 March 2026, Godoy was fouled for a penalty awarded to Bolivia, successfully converted by teammate Miguel Terceros in their 2–1 win in the 2026 FIFA World Cup qualification inter-confederation play-offs against Suriname.

== Career statistics ==
=== International ===
As of match played 31 March 2026

Appearances and goals by national team and year
National team	Year	Apps	Goals
Bolivia	2026	4	1
Total		4	1

=== International goals ===
No.	Date	Venue	Opponent	Score	Result	Competition
1.	15 March 2026	Estadio Ramón Tahuichi Aguilera, Santa Cruz, Bolivia	Trinidad and Tobago	2–0	3–0	Friendly
Last updated 16 March 2026

== Personal life ==
Godoy is nicknamed 'El Pelado'. He has a son born in Sucre. In July 2024, he obtained Bolivian nationality, after seven years of residence in the country.
