= David de la Torre =

Bolivian footballer and manager (born 1970)

Personal information
- Full name: David de la Torre García
- Date of birth: 16 March 1981 (age 45)
- Place of birth: Cuernavaca, Mexico
- Height: 1.74 m (5 ft 9 in)
- Position: Defender

Youth career
- Atlas

Senior career*
Years	Team	Apps	(Gls)
2001–2002	Chapulineros de Oaxaca		
2002–2003	Potros UAEM		
2003	Guerreros Acapulco	3	(0)
2003	Jaguares de Tapachula	8	(1)
2004	Atlético Bucaramanga		
2004–2005	Querétaro	16	(0)
2005	Colorado Rapids		
2006	Águilas Riviera Maya	9	(0)
2006	Zacatepec	16	(0)

Managerial career
- 2009: Atlas U20 (assistant)
- 2011: Real América
- 2012: Real Mamoré
- 2012: Universitario de Sucre
- 2013: Sport Boys Warnes
- 2013–2014: Guabirá
- 2014–2015: Petrolero
- 2015: Nacional Potosí
- 2016: Real Santa Cruz
- 2016: Real Potosí
- 2017–2018: Royal Pari
- 2018–2019: Always Ready
- 2023–2024: Royal Pari
- 2024: Ciudad Nueva Santa Cruz
- 2024: Royal Pari
- * Club domestic league appearances and goals

David de la Torre García (born 16 March 1981) is a Mexican football manager and former player who played as a defender.

== Playing career ==
Born in Cuernavaca, de la Torre began his professional career with Guerreros Acapulco making his debut in the 2003 Verano tournament. He subsequently played for Jaguares de Tapachula before moving to Colombian side Atlético Bucaramanga in 2004.

de la Torre returned to his home country with Querétaro in the same year, before representing Colorado Rapids in the 2005 season. In 2006, after playing for Águilas Riviera Maya and Zacatepec, he retired.

== Coaching career ==
After retiring, de la Torre worked as an assistant coach of the under-20 team of his former side Atlas, before moving to Bolivia in 2011 as manager of Real América. On 25 December of that year, he replaced Sergio Apaza at the helm of Real Mamoré.

de la Torre left Real Mamoré on 4 May 2012, due to the club's financial problems. On 21 August, he took over Universitario de Sucre also in the top tier, but left in November.

On 28 March 2013, de la Torre was named Sport Boys Warnes manager. He led the club to a first-ever promotion to the first division, but was dismissed on 22 July. In October, he was named in charge of Guabirá, but was sacked on 25 March 2014.

de la Torre was appointed manager of Petrolero on 15 August 2014, but was relieved of his duties on 2 April of the following year. He agreed to become Nacional Potosí's manager on 1 September 2015, but left on 25 November.

On 1 June 2016, after a short period at Real Santa Cruz, de la Torre was appointed at Real Potosí. He resigned on 4 December, before taking over Royal Pari a day later.

On 4 April 2018, after also taking Royal Pari to a first-ever promotion, de la Torre left the club. He won his second Copa Simón Bolívar with Always Ready in the end of the year, but left on 30 January 2019.

de la Torre returned to Royal Pari in December 2022, as a sporting director, but was named interim manager the following 23 May. On 9 June 2023, he was permanently named manager of the side for the remainder of the season.

On 12 August 2024, de la Torre was sacked from Royal Pari after a poor run of results.

== Personal life ==
He is the cousin of former Mexican international José Manuel de la Torre.
