= Carlos Roca =

Carlos Roca may refer to:

- Carlos Roca (politician) (born 1946), Peruvian politician
- Carlos Roca (field hockey) (1958–2003), Spanish field hockey player
- Carlos Roca (English footballer) (born 1984), English footballer
- Carlos Roca (Bolivian footballer) (born 1997), Bolivian footballer
