= Cristian Farah =

Bolivian football manager

Personal information
- Full name: Cristian David Farah Senseve
- Date of birth: 9 July 1989 (age 37)
- Place of birth: Santa Cruz de la Sierra, Bolivia

Team information
- Current team: Bolivia (assistant)

Managerial career
- Years: Team
- 2013–2014: Royal Pari
- 2019: Sport Boys (assistant)
- 2019: Dios Es Amor
- 2020–2021: The Strongest (assistant)
- 2020–2021: Estudiantes del Norte
- 2021–2022: Royal Pari (assistant)
- 2022–2023: Nueva Santa Cruz
- 2024: Real Santa Cruz
- 2024–: Bolivia (assistant)

Cristian David Farah Senseve (born 9 July 1989) is a Bolivian football manager. He is the current assistant manager of the Bolivia national team.

== Career ==
Born in Santa Cruz de la Sierra, Farah began working as a video analyst at Mauricio Soria's staff at The Strongest, Wilstermann, Real Potosí and Blooming. He was also a part of Soria's staff in the Bolivia national team under the same role, and was also a manager of lower league clubs in the Santa Cruz Football Association Championship.

Ahead of the 2019 season, Farah moved to Peru and joined Jesús Álvarez's staff at Sport Boys, as an assistant. Upon returning, he became manager of lowly side Dios Es Amor FC before becoming an assistant of Alberto Illanes at The Strongest.

In August 2021, Farah joined Miguel Ángel Portugal's staff at Royal Pari, as an assistant. He left the club in March of the following year, to take over Nueva Santa Cruz of the Copa Simón Bolívar.

Farah departed Nueva Santa Cruz in May 2023, and was named manager of Real Santa Cruz on 9 January 2024. He resigned from the latter club on 9 April.
