= Jair Torrico =

Bolivian footballer (born 1986)

Personal information
- Full name: Jair Torrico Camacho
- Date of birth: 2 August 1986 (age 40)
- Place of birth: Cochabamba, Bolivia
- Height: 1.74 m (5 ft 9 in)
- Positions: Left back; right back

Team information
- Current team: Aurora
- Number: 12

Senior career*
| Years | Team | Apps | (Gls) |
| 2010 | Wilstermann | 27 | (0) |
| 2011–2016 | The Strongest | 199 | (4) |
| 2017 | Sport Boys Warnes | 34 | (3) |
| 2018–2019 | San José | 91 | (6) |
| 2020 | Always Ready | 20 | (0) |
| 2021 | Royal Pari | 6 | (0) |
| 2021– | Aurora | 146 | (13) |

International career
| 2010– | Bolivia | 4 | (0) |
- * Club domestic league appearances and goals as of 30 December 2025

Jair Torrico (born 2 August 1986) is a Bolivian footballer who plays for Aurora and Bolivia national football team

== Honours ==
The Strongest

Winner

- Liga de Fútbol Profesional Boliviano (3): 2011–12, 2012–13, 2013–14

Runners-up

- Liga de Fútbol Profesional Boliviano (2): 2011–12, 2014–15

Wilstermann

Winner

- Liga de Fútbol Profesional Boliviano: 2010
