= Richet Gómez =

Bolivian association football player (born 1998)

Personal information
- Full name: Richet Gómez Miranda
- Date of birth: 3 November 1998 (age 27)
- Place of birth: La Paz, Bolivia
- Position: Defender

Team information
- Current team: Club Always Ready

Senior career*
Years	Team	Apps	(Gls)
2016-2022	The Strongest		
2020	→ Atletico Palmaflor (loan)		
2023-2025	Club Blooming	76	(11)
2026-	Club Always Ready	5	(0)

International career
2025-	Bolivia	4	(0)
- * Club domestic league appearances and goals as of 00:15 (UTC) 27 May 2026

Richet Gómez Miranda (born 3 November 1998) is a Bolivian professional footballer who plays for Club Always Ready and the Bolivia national football team.

== Club career ==
Born in La Paz, Gómez plays as a central defender. He made his professional debut for The Strongest. Having played 11 games in the 2019 season, but only one as a starter, he went on to play for on loan for C.D. Palmaflor del Trópico in 2020. After joining Club Blooming in 2022, he became a regular first team starter.

Having played 100 matches in all competitions and scored 11 goals in three seasons for Club Blooming, Gómez joined defending league champions Club Always Ready prior to the start of the 2026 season. He scored his first goal for his new club against Club Bolivar in Torneo de Verano in March 2026.

== International career ==
Gómez was called up to the Bolivia national football team for the first time in 2025. He made his debut against South Korea on 14 November 2025.
