= César Menacho =

César Menacho may refer to:

- César Menacho (sport shooter)
- César Menacho (footballer)
