= Caboface =

Bolivian organization of beer manufacturers

Caboface or Camara Boliviana de Fabricantes de Cerveza is a Bolivian chamber of commerce dedicated to organizing Bolivia's beer manufacturers. Caboface's main offices are located at La Paz.

Caboface's executive director is Oscar Fernando Aguilar Orellana.

== History ==
Caboface was formed in 1996, when leaders of five different leading Bolivian beer companies got together to join forces and represent the Bolivian beer industry. These leaders included David Rodriguez Ugarte of Cerveceria Bavaria Union Tarija, Luis Medinacelli Valencia of Cerveceria Boliviana Nacional, Victor Kellemberg Lozano of Cerveceria Santa Cruz, Andres Quintana Camps of Sociedad Industrial del Sur and Luis Lozano Moya of Cerveceria Taquiña.

During 2011, Caboface asked British company Ernst & Young to conduct a study about beer drinking in Bolivia and to compare Bolivia to the rest of the world as far as beer consuming was concerned. This study revealed that Bolivians drink less beer a year than Germans, Venezuelans, Spaniards, Brazilians and Argentinians but more than Uruguayans.

== Current Caboface member beer brands ==
- Taquiňa
- Paceňa
- Huari
- Cerveceria Nacional Potosí
- Sociedad Industrial del Sur
- Bebidas Bolivianas (owner of Cerveza Real)
- Saya Beer

== See also ==
- List of countries by beer consumption per capita
