= Flabio Torres =

Colombian footballer and manager (born 1970)

Personal information
- Full name: José Flabio Torres Sierra
- Date of birth: 7 December 1970 (age 55)
- Place of birth: Ibagué, Colombia
- Height: 1.81 m (5 ft 11 in)
- Position: Defender

Team information
- Current team: Alianza (manager)

Senior career*
Years	Team	Apps	(Gls)
1988–1989	Deportivo Cali		
1990	Once Caldas		
1991	Deportes Tolima		
1992	Cúcuta Deportivo		
1993–1994	Santa Fe		
1995	Atlético Bello		
1996–1997	Cooperamos Tolima		
1998	Atlético Huila		
1998	Girardot		

Managerial career
- 1999–2005: Deportes Tolima (youth)
- 2006–2007: Deportivo Pereira (assistant)
- 2008: Expreso Rojo
- 2009: Deportivo Pasto (assistant)
- 2010: Deportivo Cali (assistant)
- 2010: Deportivo Pasto (assistant)
- 2011–2013: Deportivo Pasto
- 2014–2015: Once Caldas
- 2015: Cúcuta Deportivo
- 2016: Atlético Bucaramanga
- 2017–2018: Deportivo Pasto
- 2019: Atlético Bucaramanga
- 2019: Águilas Doradas
- 2020: Binacional
- 2021–2023: Deportivo Pasto
- 2024: Always Ready
- 2024: Nacional Potosí
- 2025–2026: Boyacá Chicó
- 2026: Real Potosí
- 2026–: Alianza
- * Club domestic league appearances and goals

José Flabio Torres Sierra (born 7 December 1970) is a Colombian football manager and former footballer who played as a defender. He is the current manager of Colombian club Alianza.
