= Alejandro Russo =

Argentine footballer

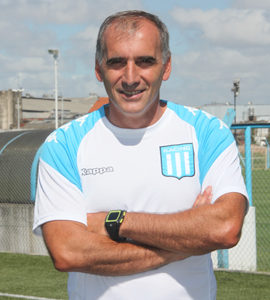
- Russo in 2016

Personal information
- Full name: Alejandro Marcelo Russo
- Date of birth: 13 February 1968 (age 58)
- Place of birth: Ensenada, Argentina
- Position: Forward

Youth career
- Estudiantes LP

Senior career*
Years	Team	Apps	(Gls)
1985–1990	Estudiantes LP	86	(16)
1991	Argentinos Juniors	1	(0)
1991–1992	Platense	9	(1)
1992	Atlético Marbella		
1993	Huracán		
1994	Comunicaciones		
1995	Racing de Olavarría		
1995–1996	Temperley		

International career
1987	Argentina U20		
1987–1988	Argentina U23		

Managerial career
- 2000–2006: Estudiantes LP (youth)
- 2006: Monarcas Morelia (assistant)
- 2007–2008: Estudiantes LP (youth)
- 2008: Estudiantes LP (interim)
- 2009: Argentinos Juniors (assistant)
- 2010: Racing Club (assistant)
- 2011: Instituto (assistant)
- 2013: Sporting Cristal (assistant)
- 2014–2015: San Lorenzo (youth)
- 2018–2020: San Lorenzo (youth)
- 2021: Unión La Calera (assistant)
- 2022–2023: Gimnasia Jujuy (assistant)
- 2023: Melgar (assistant)
- 2024: Jorge Wilstermann (assistant)
- 2024: Unión Comercio
- * Club domestic league appearances and goals

Alejandro Marcelo Russo (born 13 February 1968) is an Argentine football manager and former player who played as a forward.

== Playing career ==
Russo played mainly for Estudiantes de La Plata and Argentinos Juniors, among other clubs. He also represented Argentina at the 1988 Summer Olympics in Seoul, making two appearances in the competition.

In October 1990, Russo went on trial at Manchester United, for whom he made two reserve team appearances.

== Managerial career ==
After being an assistant and youth manager, Russo joined Gastón Ramondino's staff at Bolivian club Jorge Wilstermann in 2024. On 13 June of that year, he was named manager of the club, but he left the club on 8 July without managing in a single match.

On 22 August 2024, Russo took over the Peruvian side Unión Comercio.
