= Thiago Leitão =

Brazilian footballer and manager (born 1978

Personal information
- Full name: Thiago Leitão Polieri
- Date of birth: 12 June 1978 (age 48)
- Place of birth: Campinas, Brazil
- Height: 1.73 m (5 ft 8 in)
- Position: Midfielder

Youth career
- Ponte Preta

Senior career*
Years	Team	Apps	(Gls)
1998–2001	Ponte Preta	1	(0)
2002	Inter da Santa Maria	8	(0)
2002	Ceará	6	(0)
2002–2005	Jorge Wilstermann	80	(46)
2005–2006	Marco	13	(3)
2006	Oriente Petrolero	35	(7)
2007	Bolívar	28	(6)
2008	The Strongest	16	(3)
2009	União Barbarense	13	(0)
2009–2010	The Strongest	38	(6)
2013–2014	Sport Boys Warnes		

Managerial career
- 2017–2018: Jorge Wilstermann (assistant)
- 2019: Aurora
- 2021: San José
- 2021: Atlético Palmaflor
- 2023: Blooming
- 2023–2024: San Antonio Bulo Bulo
- 2024: Royal Pari
- 2025: Universitario de Vinto
- 2026: Independiente Petrolero
- * Club domestic league appearances and goals

Thiago Leitão Polieri (born 12 June 1978) is a Brazilian football manager and former player who played as a midfielder.

== Playing career ==
Born in Campinas, São Paulo, Leitão was a Ponte Preta youth graduate. After making his first team debut, he represented Internacional de Santa Maria and Ceará before moving to Bolivia in 2002, to join Jorge Wilstermann.

In 2005, Leitão signed for Portuguese Segunda Liga side F.C. Marco, but returned to Bolivia in the following year with Oriente Petrolero. In 2008, he agreed to a contract with The Strongest, and had a subsequent short stint at local side União Barbarense before returning to the club in 2009.

In 2013, after spending some time without a club, Leitão joined Sport Boys Warnes in the Copa Simón Bolívar. He retired in the following year, after helping the club in their promotion to Primera División.

== Managerial career ==
In 2017, Leitão returned to Wilstermann as Álvaro Peña's assistant. In August 2018, after a fight with Argentine midfielder Cristian Chávez, he was sacked by the club.

In April 2019, Leitão was named manager of Aurora. He left the club in May, after his contract expired.

On 2 March 2021, Leitão was appointed manager of San José. He resigned from the club late in the month, to take over fellow league team Atlético Palmaflor.

On 16 December 2022, Leitão was named manager of Blooming for the upcoming season, but was sacked after just three matches.

Leitão later became manager of San Antonio Bulo Bulo, leading the side to a first-ever promotion to the top tier and later winning the 2024 Apertura tournament. On 1 October of that year, he was sacked after a poor performance in the Clausura, and took over fellow league team Royal Pari fifteen days later, where he also left by mutual consent on 26 November.

On 6 January 2025, Leitão was confirmed as manager of Universitario de Vinto also in the top tier. On 30 September, he resigned, and was named at the helm of Independiente Petrolero on 16 March 2026.

On 6 August 2026, Leitão left Independiente by mutual consent.
