= Carlos Roca (Bolivian footballer) =

Bolivian footballer (born 1997)

Personal information
- Full name: Carlos Daniel Roca Avellaneda
- Date of birth: 11 May 1997 (age 29)
- Place of birth: Cobija, Bolivia
- Height: 1.68 m (5 ft 6 in)
- Position: Left back

Team information
- Current team: The Strongest
- Number: 15

Senior career*
Years	Team	Apps	(Gls)
2014–2015	Universitario Pando	16	(0)
2018–2022	Oriente Petrolero	73	(3)
2023–2024	The Strongest	46	(0)
2025	Nacional Potosí	3	(0)
2025–	The Strongest	1	(0)

International career^{‡}
2017	Bolivia U20	2	(0)
2022–2023	Bolivia	7	(0)
- * Club domestic league appearances and goals as of 30 December 2025 ‡ National team caps and goals as of 20:02, 18 September 2024 (UTC)

Carlos Daniel Roca Avellaneda (born 11 May 1997) is a Bolivian footballer who plays as a left back for The Strongest.

He has totalled over 125 games in the Bolivian Primera División for Universitario de Pando, Oriente Petrolero and The Strongest, winning the league in 2023 with the last of those clubs. He made his debut for the Bolivia national football team in 2022.

== Club career ==
Born in Cobija, in the Pando Department, Roca began his career at Universitario de Pando. In 2022, he recorded his best figures for Oriente Petrolero with 33 games and his first 3 goals in the Bolivian Primera División.

In November 2022, with his contract at Petrolero expiring, Roca signed for The Strongest. His first season at the club from La Paz saw them win the league title. In June 2024, with his contract to expire in December and his year having been affected by injuries, he considered leaving in order to play more and return to the national team.

In January 2025, Roca joined Nacional Potosí as their eighth addition for the new season.

== International career ==
Roca was called up for the Bolivia under-20 team for the South American Youth Football Championship in Ecuador in 2017.

In November 2022, Roca was called up to the senior side for the first time, for a friendly away to neighbours Peru. He played the full 90 minutes of the 1–0 loss in Arequipa on 19 December. In late 2023, Roca played three qualification matches for the 2026 FIFA World Cup. The games ended in defeats to Brazil, Ecuador and Paraguay.
