= Facundo Biondi =

Argentine football manager

Personal information
- Full name: Facundo Nahuel Biondi
- Date of birth: 8 April 1992 (age 34)
- Place of birth: Rosario, Argentina

Team information
- Current team: ABB (manager)

Managerial career
- Years: Team
- 2015–2018: ADIUR (assistant)
- 2019–2022: ADIUR
- 2023: Racing Club (reserves)
- 2023: Racing Club (assistant)
- 2024: Always Ready
- 2025: ABB

Facundo Nahuel Biondi (born 8 April 1992) is an Argentine football manager.

== Career ==
Born in Rosario, Biondi began his career with Asociación Deportiva Infantil Unión Rosario (ADIUR), being an assistant of Gerardo Ameli and Fernando Bacci before becoming the manager of the first team in 2019. In November 2022, he agreed to join Racing Club as an assistant of Sebastián Grazzini and Ezequiel Videla in the reserve team.

In October 2023, Biondi became an assistant of Racing's first team after Grazzini and Videla were named interim managers. In December, he was offered the managerial role in the reserve side, but rejected the offer.

On 7 September 2024, Biondi moved abroad after being named manager of Bolivian Primera División side Always Ready. On 8 November, however, he was sacked.

On 25 August 2025, Biondi took over ABB also in the Bolivian top tier. On 6 October, he was dismissed.
