= Óscar Baldomar =

Bolivian footballer (born 1996)

Personal information
- Full name: Óscar Junior Baldomar Roca
- Date of birth: February 16, 1996 (age 30)
- Place of birth: Santa Cruz de la Sierra, Bolivia
- Height: 1.78 m (5 ft 10 in)
- Position: Defender

Team information
- Current team: Nacional Potosí
- Number: 23

Senior career*
Years	Team	Apps	(Gls)
2015–2017	Club Bolívar	30	(3)
2017–2018	Universitario de Sucre	42	(1)
2018	Club Bolívar	13	(0)
2019	Sport Boys Warnes	17	(0)
2020	Club Real Potosí	23	(3)
2021	Club Blooming	10	(0)
2022–	Nacional Potosí	77	(1)
2023	Palmaflor (loan)	29	(0)

International career^{‡}
2013	Bolivia U17	4	(0)
2015	Bolivia U20	3	(0)
2018	Bolivia	1	(0)
- * Club domestic league appearances and goals ‡ National team caps and goals as of 28 December 2025

Oscar Junior Baldomar Roca (born 16 January 1996) is a Bolivian professional footballer who plays for Nacional Potosí in the Bolivian Primera División.

== Club career ==
Having been developed through the academy at Club Bolivar, initially as a winger, Baldomar joined Universitario de Sucre in 2017. In January 2021 Baldomar signed for Club Blooming on a one-year contract. He joined Nacional Potosí in December 2021, re-signing for the club ahead of the 2025 sesson.

== International career ==
On May 28, 2018, he made his debut for the Bolivia national football team against the United States national football team.
