= Darío Torrico =

Bolivian association football player (born 2000)

Personal information
- Full name: Darío Osmar Torrico Espejo
- Date of birth: 18 May 2000 (age 26)
- Place of birth: Cochabamba, Bolivia
- Height: 1.65 m (5 ft 5 in)
- Position: Midfielder

Team information
- Current team: Always Ready
- Number: 19

Youth career
- 2010-: Aurora

Senior career*
Years	Team	Apps	(Gls)
2019–2024	Aurora	165	(18)
2025–	Always Ready	36	(10)
- * Club domestic league appearances and goals as of 27 May 2026 ‡ National team caps and goals as of 23:06, 4 September 2025 (UTC)

Darío Osmar Torrico Espejo (born 18 October 2000) is a Bolivian professional footballer who plays a as a midfielder for Club Always Ready in the Bolivian Primera División.

== Early and personal life ==
Torrico is from Cochabamba, and joined Club Aurora as a youth-team player when he was ten years-old. He attended Andres Bello School in Cochabamba, and also helped out with working at his parents', Dario and Norma, soft drinks store in the city, with his brother Josue. He also has younger siblings Jessica and Dylan.

== Club career ==
=== Club Aurora ===
After progress through the Club Aurora under-20 team, Torrico made his senior first team debut for the club in the Bolivian Primera División on 19 January 2019, at age 18, featuring in a 2–1 away league defeat to The Strongest. That year, he had a five-year contract with the club. Within a couple of seasons he was a regular starter in their midfield. He went on to play for the club in the Copa Libertadores in 2024, including scoring a 96th-minute equaliser in a 1–1 draw against Brazilian side Botafogo.

=== Club Always Ready ===
He announced his departure from Aurora at the end of the 2024 season. He signed for Club Always Ready in January 2025. He demonstrated good form in his first season for the club, scoring nine goals and providing five assists in his first 23 matches in all competitions, by the end of August that year.

== International career ==
On 26 August 2025, Torrico was called up to the Bolivia national football team ahead of their FIFA World Cup qualifying matches against Colombia and Brazil on 4 and 8 September. He had previously been invited to train with the national team shortly after his senior league debut in 2019.
