= Carlos Melgar =

Bolivian footballer (born 1994

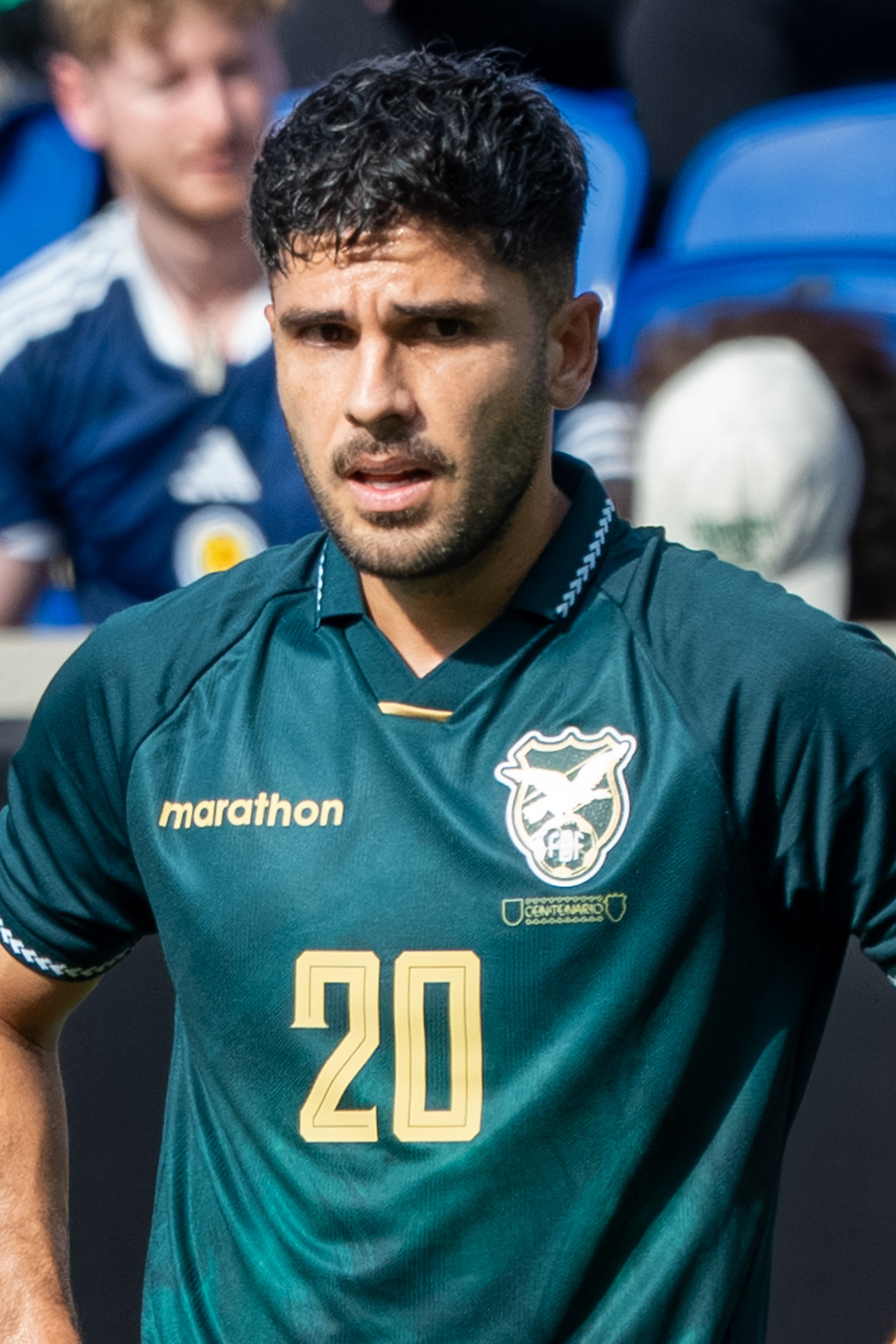
- Melgar in 2026

Personal information
- Full name: Carlos Antonio Melgar Vargas
- Date of birth: 4 November 1994 (age 32)
- Place of birth: Santa Cruz de la Sierra, Bolivia
- Height: 1.70 m (5 ft 7 in)
- Position: Midfielder

Team information
- Current team: Bolívar
- Number: 80

Youth career
- –2016: Oriente Petrolero

Senior career*
Years	Team	Apps	(Gls)
2016–2018	Oriente Petrolero	16	(1)
2017	→ Petrolero (loan)	19	(1)
2018	→ Wilstermann (loan)	36	(7)
2019–2020	Wilstermann	55	(12)
2021	Royal Pari	26	(9)
2022–2023	Bolívar	41	(5)
2023	→ Royal Pari (loan)	6	(0)
2024	Guabirá	12	(7)
2024–	Bolívar	72	(22)

International career^{‡}
2018–	Bolivia	8	(0)
- * Club domestic league appearances and goals as of 17 September 2026 ‡ National team caps and goals as of 27 September 2026

Carlos Antonio Melgar Vargas (born 4 November 1994) is a Bolivian professional footballer who plays as a midfielder for Bolívar. He is a Bolivia international.

== Club career ==
He is from Santa Cruz de la Sierra and played for Oriente Petrolero prior to joining Jorge Wilstermann on loan in 2018, with the deal becoming permanent later that year. He left the club to the start of the 2021 season, with the club's budget impacted by the COVID-19 pandemic.

He joined Royal Pari in 2021, making his debut in an 8–0 victory over Club Aurora, and made a strong start, scoring five goals in his first three matches for his new club. After joining Club Bolivar, he had short spells on-loan with Club Blooming and once again with Royal Pari in 2023.

He scored seven goals for Club Deportivo Guabirá in 2024, prior to a move back to Club Bolivar mid-season. Playing as a left-sided attacking player, he continued his good form, scoring a further eleven goals for Bolivar in the latter half of the year. He featured for Bolivar in the Copa Sudamericana during the 2025 season. He again demonstrated good form for the club that year, by August 2025 he had made 29 appearances and contributed eight goals with six assists for Bolivar, leading to international recognition.

== International career ==
Melgar made his senior international debut for the Bolivia national team on 13 October 2018 against Myanmar a 3–0 victory at the Thuwanna YTC Stadium. He also featured in matches against Haiti and Venezuela in 2019. He returned to the Bolivian national team under head coach Oscar Villegas in 2025.

== Personal life ==
He has that nickname "Tonino".

== Career statistics ==
=== International ===
As of matches played 27 September 2026

Appearances and goals by national team and year
National team	Year	Apps	Goals
Bolivia	2018	1	0
Bolivia	2019	1	0
Bolivia	2021	1	0
Bolivia	2025	2	0
Bolivia	2026	3	0
Total		8	0

== Honours ==
Jorge Wilstermann

- Primera División: 2018-A, 2019-C

Bolívar

- Primera División: 2022-A, 2024
