= Flavio Robatto =

Argentine footballer and manager (born 1974)

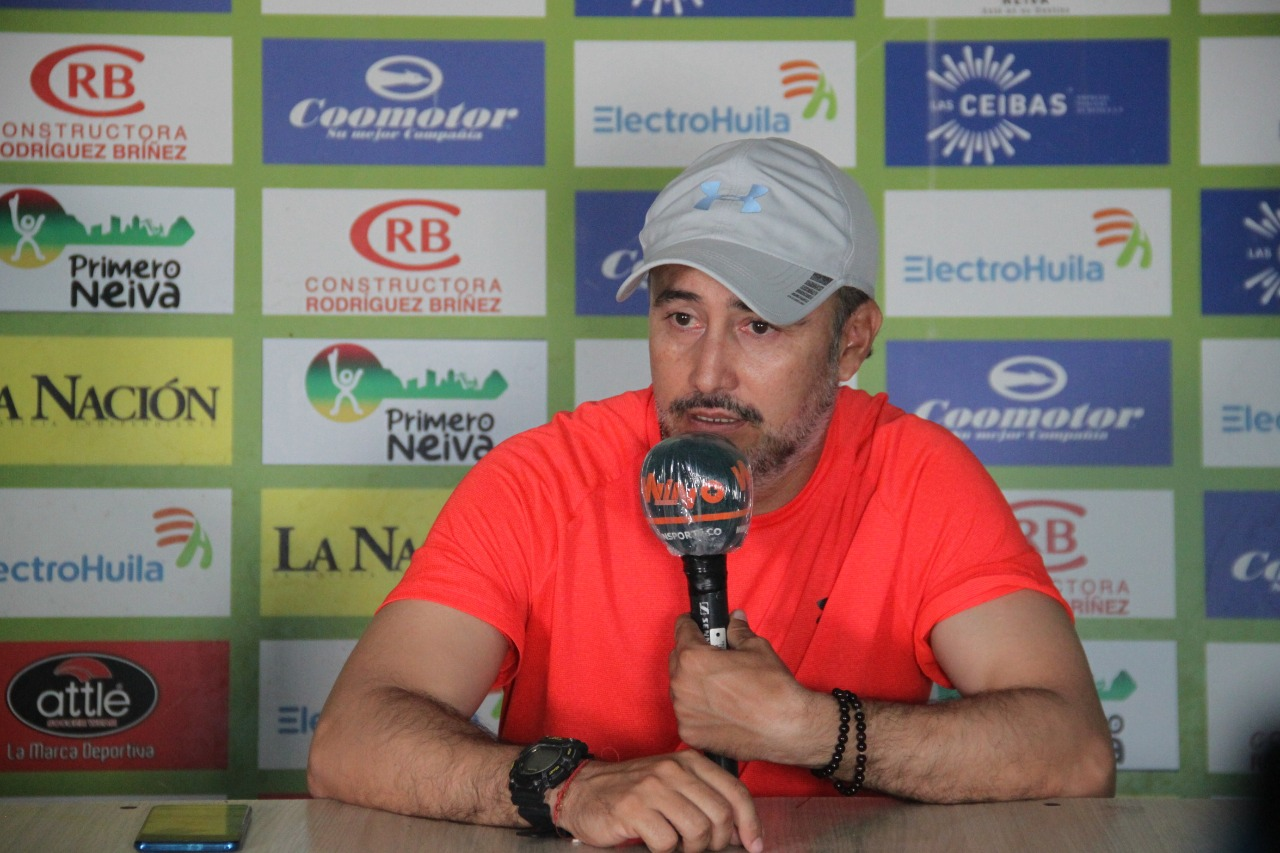
- Robatto in 2020 with Atlético Huila

Personal information
- Full name: Flavio Horacio Robatto
- Date of birth: 16 January 1974 (age 52)
- Place of birth: Río Cuarto, Argentina
- Height: 1.80 m (5 ft 11 in)
- Position: Midfielder

Team information
- Current team: Águilas Doradas (manager)

Youth career
- Estudiantes de Río Cuarto

Senior career*
Years	Team	Apps	(Gls)
- Platense
- Comunicaciones
- Cultural Alberdi

Managerial career
- 1998–1999: Comunicaciones
- 2000–2004: Cultural Alberdi
- 2004–2005: Renato Cesarini
- 2005–2006: Andino
- 2006: Cultural Alberdi
- 2007: Villa Valeria
- 2008: Central Argentino
- 2009: Mitre
- 2010: Estudiantes de Santiago del Estero
- 2011–2014: Barcelona SC (assistant)
- 2015: Norte América
- 2015–2016: Millonarios (assistant)
- 2017: Cúcuta Deportivo
- 2018: Alianza Atlético
- 2018: Jaguares de Córdoba
- 2019: LDU Loja
- 2020: Atlético Huila
- 2021: Nacional Potosí
- 2022: Nacional Potosí
- 2023: Nacional Potosí
- 2024–2026: Bolívar
- 2026–: Águilas Doradas
- * Club domestic league appearances and goals

Flavio Horacio Robatto (born 16 January 1974) is an Argentine football manager and former player who played as a midfielder. He is the current manager of Colombian club Águilas Doradas.

== Career ==
Born in Río Cuarto, Córdoba, Robatto was a youth graduate of hometown side Estudiantes de Río Cuarto before being registered as a Platense player. He retired at the age of 26 due to a Hepatitis B, and subsequently became a manager.

Robatto then managed several lowly sides in his home country before moving abroad in 2011, as an assistant manager of Álex Aguinaga. In 2015, he worked as manager of Norte América before being named Rubén Israel's assistant at Millonarios.

In March 2017, Robatto was appointed manager of Cúcuta Deportivo, but was sacked on 21 November. He was named in charge of Peruvian Segunda División side Alianza Atlético the following 24 February, but was dismissed on 6 June 2018.

In August 2018, Robatto agreed to a deal with Atlético Bucaramanga to become their manager, but the deal was cancelled days later, due to a supposed deal with Polish side MKS Kalwarianka. Late in the month, he was announced as manager of Jaguares de Córdoba.

Robatto resigned from Jaguares on 29 October 2018, and took over LDU Loja in Ecuador the following 20 June. On 2 January 2020, he was appointed in charge of Atlético Huila, but resigned in September.

On 13 April 2021, Robatto replaced Álvaro Peña as manager of Bolivian side Nacional Potosí. He was in charge of the side on two further occasions, in 2022 and 2023. On 3 January 2024, Robatto resigned from Nacional Potosí, and took over Bolívar two days later. On 21 April 2026, he also resigned from the latter.

On 16 June 2026, Robatto returned to Colombia after being appointed as manager of Águilas Doradas.

== Honours ==
Bolívar

- FBF División Profesional: 2024
