= Carlos Ventura =

Dominican footballer (b. 1997)

Personal information
- Full name: Carlos Eduardo Ventura Soriano
- Date of birth: 27 August 1997 (age 29)
- Place of birth: Los Mina, Dominican Republic
- Position: Right winger

Team information
- Current team: Cibao
- Number: 28

Senior career*
Years	Team	Apps	(Gls)
2016–2017	CD Montesinos		
2017–2018	CFI Alicante		
2018	Hércules B	8	(2)
2019	AC Torrellano		
2019–2020	Horadada	28	(11)
2020–2021	Callosa Deportiva	9	(1)
2021	Cibao	22	(4)
2021–2022	Mazarrón	21	(8)
2022	Algar	1	(0)
2022-2023	Cibao	44	(14)
2024	Oriente Petrolero	10	(5)
2024–2025	Al-Nasr	17	(1)
2025-2026	Cibao	26	(7)
2026-	The Strongest	14	(1)

International career^{‡}
2021–	Dominican Republic	12	(0)
- * Club domestic league appearances and goals as of 21 September 2026 ‡ National team caps and goals as of 15 December 2025

Carlos Eduardo Ventura Soriano (born 27 August 1997) is a Dominican professional footballer who plays as a right winger for Kuwaiti Premier League club Al-Nasr and the Dominican Republic national team.

== Early life ==
Ventura was born in 1997 in the Dominican Republic. He moved to Spain at the age of seven.

== Career ==
Ventura started his career with Spanish side CD Montesinos. He helped the club achieve promotion. In 2023, he signed for Dominican Republic side Cibao. He helped the club win the league.

== Style of play ==
Ventura mainly operates as a striker. He is known for his speed.
