= Gastón Ramondino =

Argentine football coach (born 1971)

Personal information
- Full name: Víctor Gastón Ramondino
- Date of birth: 23 June 1971 (age 55)
- Place of birth: Buenos Aires, Argentina

Team information
- Current team: Deportivo Riestra (set piece coach)

Managerial career
- Years: Team
- Acassuso (youth)
- 2015: Acassuso (interim)
- 2016: Acassuso (interim)
- 2016: Acassuso (interim)
- 2017: Sud América (assistant)
- 2018: Santa Tecla (assistant)
- 2019–2021: Jorge Wilstermann (assistant)
- 2021: Royal Pari (assistant)
- 2021–2022: The Strongest (assistant)
- 2023–2024: Jorge Wilstermann (assistant)
- 2024: Jorge Wilstermann
- 2024: Deportivo Morón (assistant)
- 2024: Cienciano (assistant)
- 2025: Tembetary (assistant)
- 2025: Unión Tarija
- 2026: Deportivo Madryn (assistant)

Víctor Gastón Ramondino (born 23 June 1971) is an Argentine football manager, currently the set piece coach of Deportivo Riestra.

== Career ==
Born in Buenos Aires, Ramondino began working at Acassuso in 1997, being a youth manager and coordinator. In August 2015, he was also an interim manager of the main squad, being later named manager until the end of the season on 1 September.

Back to the youth sides of Acassuso for the 2016 season, Ramondino was again interim of the main squad in November of that year. On 28 March 2017, he moved to Uruguay and became a fitness coach at Sud América, but left with the departure of Damián Timpani in September.

In 2018, Ramondino started to work at Christian Díaz's staff at Santa Tecla, as a fitness coach. He followed Díaz to Jorge Wilstermann, Royal Pari and The Strongest, now as an assistant.

In January 2023, Ramondino and Díaz returned to Wilstermann. On 8 March 2024, he was appointed manager of the club, as Díaz was named sporting director, but the duo resigned on 2 June.
