= Estadio Dr. Carlos Villegas =

Football stadium

- Interactive map of Estadio Dr. Carlos Villegas
- Full name: Estadio Municipal Dr. Carlos Villegas
- Location: Entre Ríos, Bolivia
- Coordinates: 17.2025°S 64.5433°W
- Elevation: 234 m
- Owner: Entre Ríos Government
- Capacity: 17,000
- Surface: Natural grass

Tenant
- San Antonio Bulo Bulo

Estadio Municipal Dr. Carlos Villegas is a multi-use stadium in Entre Ríos, Bolivia. It is used mostly for football matches, on club level by San Antonio Bulo Bulo, and has a capacity of 17,000 spectators.

== History ==
Named after politician and president of YPFB Carlos Villegas Quiroga (deceased in 2015), the stadium was inaugurated in 2022, and became the home of San Antonio Bulo Bulo in 2023. In February 2024, after the club's first-ever promotion to the División Profesional, it was approved by the Bolivian Football Federation to host top tier matches.

San Antonio qualified to the 2025 Copa Libertadores, but was unable to play at Carlos Villegas as CONMEBOL ruled out international matches in the stadium.
