= Paceña =

Bolivian beer

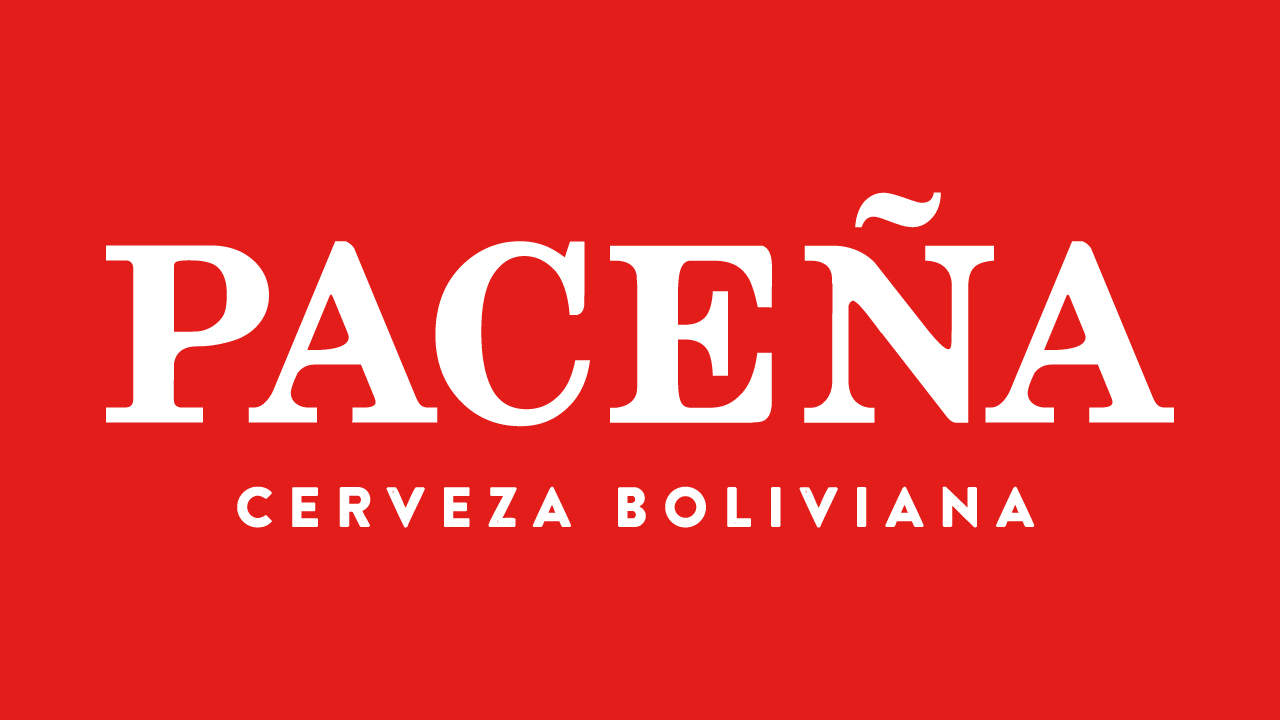
Paceña logo

Paceña is a Bolivian beer produced in La Paz, hence its name that means "the one of La Paz". The beer is produced by CBN (Cervecería Boliviana Nacional S.A.), an AB InBev company that dates back to 1877 and that controls 80% percent of the Bolivian beer market. Paceña is made at about 3,600 meters above sea level with purified water from the Andes.

== History ==
The background dates back to 1877, when the brewery, owned by Alejandro Wolf, emerged under the name of Wolf & Cía., a factory that would later take the name of Cervecería Americana and then Cervecería Nacional. On 20 October 1886, the Cervecería Nacional and the Cervecería Americana merged in the city of La Paz and together formed what is now the Cervecería Boliviana Nacional, being the owners Federico Groenewold, Luis Ernst, Hugo Preuss, and Eugenio Stohmann. At the beginning of the 20th century, the Bolivian National Brewery was installed very close to the train station, a place that coincided with the entrance portal to the city of La Paz on Montes Avenue.

Gradually, the beer was expanding to the rest of the country and that is how the product was acquiring the name of Paceña, referring to the beer produced in the city of La Paz. From the beginning, the Cervecería became one of the most important contributors to the National Treasury. In 1937, Cervecería Boliviana Nacional paid the state 20 million Bolivianos, while the three large mining companies of Patiño, Hochschild, and Aramayo for taxes on profits, transfers, exports, and fiscal patents came to pay 19,754,000 Bolivians. After the Second World War, the machinery was renewed, with which 30,000 quintals of barley were malted annually, that is, more than a third of the needs required at that time. New types of beer, such as Munich and Pilsener, were also introduced. Additionally, the Viacha Brewery and the Challapampa watershed, famous for its purity, were incorporated. In the 1950s, the machinery was renewed again to keep the factory at an optimal level of technological development.

At the end of 1986, Max Fernández Rojas was invited by the Board of Directors to perform the functions of Executive General Director. The following year, he was appointed Executive President, thus beginning a new stage in the institutional life of CBN. The CBN Plant project in Santa Cruz de la Sierra was launched in 1992 with a modern infrastructure, contributing to the economy of the region and generating both direct and indirect jobs. In November 1995, the ENALBO Plant located in the city of Oruro was inaugurated. It manufactures aluminum containers whose production is destined to satisfy the demands of the Company at a national level. In July 1999, the Argentine group Quilmes (signature Quinsa) with 71 million dollars quietly and surprisingly became the main force of the beer industry in Bolivia, acquiring 24% of the CBN that absorbed 65% of the national market, it also owned 70% of the Taquiña Brewery in Cochabamba, which controlled 15% percent of the Bolivian beer market, and 100% of the Ducal Brewery of Santa Cruz, which had 20% of the market.

Between 2001 and 2003, as a result of two merger processes, the company increased its assets, incorporating, as of 1 August 2001, the assets of Cervecería Boliviana Nacional Santa Cruz S.A., Cervecería Santa Cruz S.A., and Bavaria Union Tarija S.A. Brewery; and also as of 1 January 2003, the assets of Cervecería Taquiña S.A. and Envases de Aluminio Boliviano S.R.L. (Enalbo S.R.L.). On 9 October 2009, Cervecería Boliviana Nacional S.A. incorporated through a merger by absorption process the company Bebidas y Aguas Gaseosas de Occidente S.R.L. (ByAGO S.R.L.), with which it integrated into its assets two plants for the production and packaging of soft drinks. Short time later, the Brazilian company that produces Brahma (AmBev), most famous beer in Brazil, took over Quilmes; however, in few months. AmBev in turn merged with the European giant Interbrew, which is famous producer of Stella Artois and Becks, to form the beer monster that is InBev (Belgian-Brazilian group). Consequently, InBev owns QUINSA (Quilmes), which is in turn the majority shareholder of the CBN in Bolivia, which has the brands Paceña (national leading brand), Huari, Taquiña, Cruceña, Ducal, Astra, Bock, and Imperial, and it is also the bottler of Pepsi and 7up. CBN has eight brewing plants, soft drinks, and an aluminum can production plant in the cities of La Paz, El Alto, Santa Cruz De La Sierra, Cochabamba, Oruro, and Tarija. It is the number one company in the market throughout the country, in addition to being recognized as the leading company in corporate social responsibility.
