= Claudio Biaggio =

Argentine footballer and manager

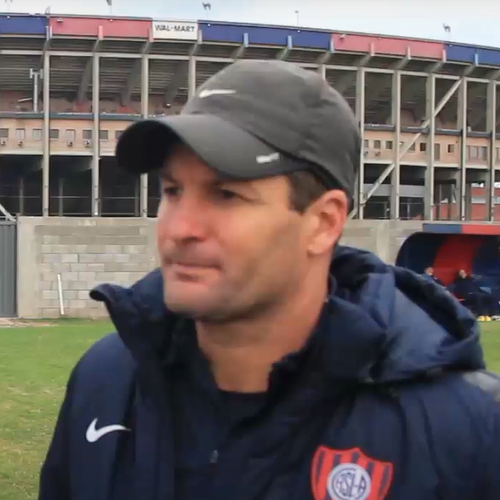
- Biaggio in 2015

Personal information
- Full name: Claudio Darío Biaggio
- Date of birth: 2 July 1967 (age 59)
- Place of birth: Santa Rosa, La Pampa, Argentina
- Height: 1.77 m (5 ft 10 in)
- Position: Forward

Team information
- Current team: Comerciantes Unidos (manager)

Senior career*
Years	Team	Apps	(Gls)
1986–1988	General Belgrano		
1989	All Boys de Santa Rosa	7	(3)
1989–1990	Peñarol		
1990–1992	Danubio	48	(24)
1992–1996	San Lorenzo	95	(36)
1996–1997	Bordeaux	16	(7)
1997–1999	San Lorenzo	74	(29)
1999–2001	Colón	50	(16)
2001	Avispa Fukuoka	12	(2)
2002	Deportivo Cuenca	5	(0)
2002	Danubio	12	(5)
2003	Oriente Petrolero	15	(13)
2004	La Plata FC	9	(5)
2005	Juventud de Las Piedras	16	(4)
2006	Deportivo Laferrere	8	(2)
2006	Estudiantes de Río Cuarto	6	(1)
2007	Teodelina FBC		
2009–2010	Ferro Carril Sud	23	(5)
2010	Atlético Tapalqué		

International career
1995	Argentina	1	(0)

Managerial career
- 2014–2017: San Lorenzo (youth)
- 2017: San Lorenzo (caretaker)
- 2017–2018: San Lorenzo
- 2020: Chacarita Juniors
- 2021: Sud América
- 2022: The Strongest
- 2023: Always Ready
- 2023: The Strongest
- 2024: Nacional Potosí
- 2024: ADT
- 2025–2026: Comerciantes Unidos
- 2026–: Comerciantes Unidos
- * Club domestic league appearances and goals

Claudio Darío Biaggio (born 2 July 1967) is an Argentine football manager and former player who played as a striker. He is the current manager of Peruvian club Comerciantes Unidos.

During his professional career he played for important clubs in Argentina (Belgrano, San Lorenzo de Almagro and Colón de Santa Fe), Uruguay (Peñarol and Danubio), France (Girondins de Bordeaux), Japan (Avispa Fukuoka), Ecuador (Deportivo Cuenca) and Bolivia (Oriente Petrolero). He also earned one cap with the Argentina national team in 1995.

== Coaching career ==
=== San Lorenzo ===
Born in Santa Rosa, La Pampa, Biaggio started his coaching career as a youth coach in San Lorenzo, before he was named manager of San Lorenzo's reserve team in January 2014.

On 22 November 2017, Biaggio was named interim manager of San Lorenzo for the rest of 2017, after the departure of Diego Aguirre. In December 2017, he was named permanently manager of the club. However, he decided to step back at the end of October 2018 after a defeat to Club Atlético Temperley. During the 2017/2018 season, Biaggio led 43 games, won 19, drew 13 and lost 11.

=== Chacarita Juniors ===
On 28 February 2020, Biaggio was appointed manager of Chacarita Juniors.

== Career statistics ==
=== Club ===
Club performance			League	
Season	Club	League	Apps	Goals
Argentina			League	
1992–93	San Lorenzo Almagro	Primera División	10	5
1993–94	San Lorenzo Almagro	Primera División	30	5
1994–95	San Lorenzo Almagro	Primera División	33	15
1995–96	San Lorenzo Almagro	Primera División	22	11
France			League	
1996–97	Girondins Bordeaux	Division 1	16	2
Argentina			League	
1996–97	San Lorenzo Almagro	Primera División	16	8
1997–98	San Lorenzo Almagro	Primera División	34	16
1998–99	San Lorenzo Almagro	Primera División	24	5
1999–00	Colón	Primera División	28	11
2000–01	Colón	Primera División	22	5
Japan			League	
2001	Avispa Fukuoka	J1 League	12	2
Venezuela			League	
2002	Deportivo Cuenca	Serie A	0	0
Uruguay			League	
2002	Danubio	Primera División	12	5
Bolivia			League	
2003	Bolívar	Liga Profesional	0	0
Country	Argentina		219	81
Country	France		16	2
Country	Japan		12	2
Country	Venezuela		0	0
Country	Uruguay		12	5
Country	Bolivia		0	0
Total			260	90

=== International ===
Argentina national team
Year	Apps	Goals
1995	1	0
Total	1	0

== Honours ==
San Lorenzo

- Argentine Primera División: 1995 Clausura

Danubio

- Torneo Clausura: 2002 Clausura

Ferro Carril Sud

- Torneo del Interior: 2009 Torneo del Interior
