= Alberto Illanes =

Bolivian footballer and manager (born 1963)

Personal information
- Full name: Alberto Illanes Puente
- Date of birth: 25 November 1963 (age 62)
- Place of birth: Uncía, Bolivia
- Height: 1.90 m (6 ft 3 in)
- Position: Defender

Senior career*
Years	Team	Apps	(Gls)
1984	Magisterio Rural		
1985	Universitario Sucre		
1986–1991	The Strongest		
1992–1999	Independiente Petrolero		
2000	Unión Central		

Managerial career
- 2000: Stormers San Lorenzo
- 2001–2002: Independiente Petrolero
- 2005: The Strongest (assistant)
- 2006: Universitario Sucre (assistant)
- 2007: Universitario Sucre
- 2008: Universitario Sucre (assistant)
- 2010: Jorge Wilstermann (assistant)
- 2011–2012: The Strongest (assistant)
- 2012: Jorge Wilstermann (assistant)
- 2013: Real Potosí (assistant)
- 2014: Real Potosí
- 2014: Blooming (assistant)
- 2015: Bolivia (assistant)
- 2016–2018: Bolivia (assistant)
- 2018–2019: Nacional Potosí
- 2020–2021: The Strongest
- 2021: Nacional Potosí
- 2022: Wilstermann
- 2023: Universitario de Vinto
- 2024: Nacional Potosí
- 2025: Real Oruro
- 2025: Guabirá
- * Club domestic league appearances and goals

Alberto Illanes Puente (born 25 November 1963) is a Bolivian football manager and former player who played as a defender.

== Career ==
Illanes was born in Uncía, and played for Magisterio Rural, Universitario de Sucre, The Strongest, Independiente Petrolero and Unión Central before retiring in 2000. Immediately after retiring he took up coaching, after becoming the manager of Stormers San Lorenzo.

In 2001, Illanes returned to his former club Independiente Petrolero; initially an interim manager, he became the side's permanent manager until the end of 2002. He subsequently left to create a football school in Sucre, and only returned to coaching duties in 2005, as Eduardo Villegas' assistant at another former club, The Strongest.

Illanes followed Villegas to Universitario Sucre as his assistant for the 2006 campaign, but was appointed manager of the side on 7 December of that year after Villegas returned to Strongest. He subsequently returned to his assistant role, and returned to work with Villegas in 2010 at Jorge Wilstermann.

In 2012, Illanes became Mauricio Soria's assistant at The Strongest, and subsequently worked with the manager at Wilstermann and Real Potosí. For the 2014 season, he was named manager of the latter club.

In the following years, Illanes worked as Soria's assistant at the Bolivia national team in two periods. On 21 August 2018, he was appointed manager of Nacional Potosí. He left the club in December 2019 after his contract expired, and took over The Strongest the following 9 March.

Sacked by Strongest on 22 April 2021, Illanes was named in charge of Nacional Potosí on 6 August. He resigned on 23 November, and returned to Wilstermann on 8 August 2022, now as manager.

On 31 December 2022, Illanes resigned from Wilstermann, and took over fellow top-tier side Universitario de Vinto the following 5 January.

Illanes was sacked from U de Vinto on 13 July 2023, and returned to Nacional Potosí the following 20 April, replacing Claudio Biaggio. He was dismissed from the latter on 8 August 2024.

On 10 January 2025, Illanes was announced as manager of first division newcomers Real Oruro. He left the club by mutual consent on 30 May, and took over fellow top-tier side Guabirá the following day.

Illanes left Guabirá by mutual consent on 31 July 2025. On 10 January of the following year, he was announced as manager of ABB also in the top tier, but the deal later collapsed.
