= Óscar Villegas =

Bolivian footballer and manager (born 1970)

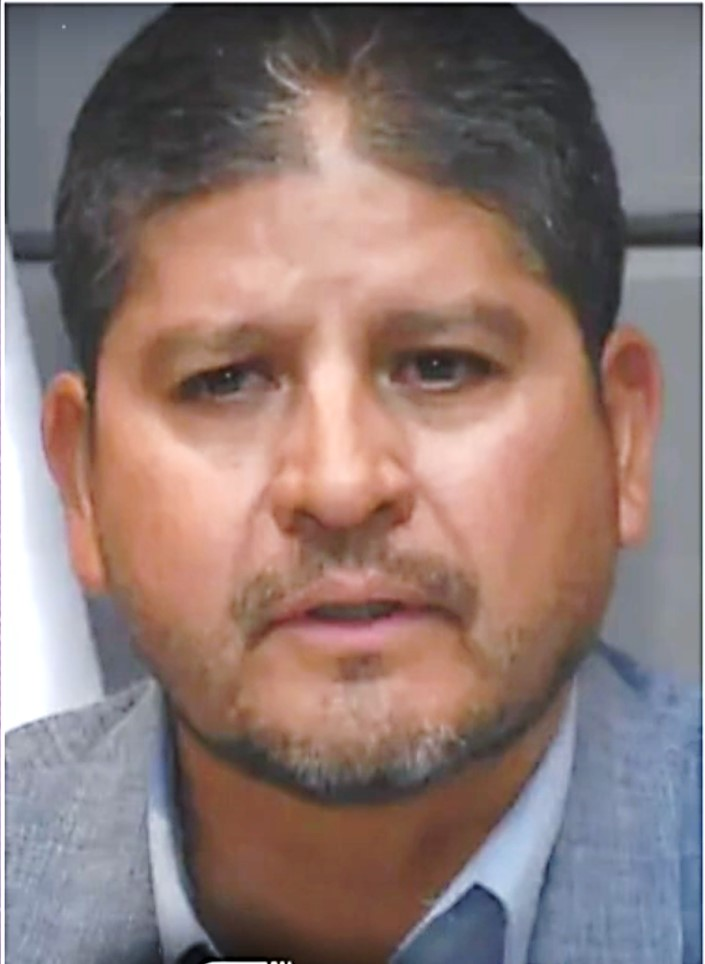
- Villegas in 2024

Personal information
- Full name: Óscar Adolfo Villegas Cámara
- Date of birth: 15 April 1970 (age 56)
- Place of birth: Cochabamba, Bolivia
- Position: Forward

Team information
- Current team: Bolivia (manager)

Youth career
- Enrique Happ

Senior career*
Years	Team	Apps	(Gls)
1987–1988	Aurora		
1988–1992	Bolívar		
1992–1993	San José		
1994	Jorge Wilstermann		(4)
1994–1996	San José		
1997	Real Santa Cruz		
1999	Independiente Petrolero		

Managerial career
- 1999: Real Potosí (assistant)
- 2000–2002: Aurora (youth)
- 2002–2003: Independiente de Quillacollo
- 2003–2004: Jorge Wilstermann (youth)
- 2004–2005: Aurora (youth)
- 2004: Aurora (interim)
- 2005–2006: Aurora
- 2007–2009: Bolivia U17
- 2007–2009: Bolivia U20
- 2010–2014: Bolívar (youth)
- 2014: Always Ready
- 2015–2018: Bolívar (youth)
- 2016: Bolívar (interim)
- 2019: Bolivia (assistant)
- 2020: Always Ready (assistant)
- 2021: Blooming (assistant)
- 2022–2023: Always Ready (youth)
- 2022: Always Ready (interim)
- 2023: Always Ready
- 2023: Always Ready (reserves)
- 2023: Always Ready (interim)
- 2024: Always Ready
- 2024: Always Ready (youth)
- 2024–: Bolivia
- * Club domestic league appearances and goals

Óscar Adolfo Villegas Cámara (born 15 April 1970) is a Bolivian football manager and former player who played as a forward. He is the current manager of the Bolivia national team.

== Playing career ==
Born in Cochabamba, Villegas began his career with Enrique Happ, and made his senior debut with Aurora at the age of 17. In the following year, he moved to Bolívar.

Villegas subsequently represented San José, Jorge Wilstermann and Real Santa Cruz before signing for Independiente Petrolero for the 1999 season. However, he suffered a knee injury and subsequently retired.

== Coaching career ==
Shortly after retiring, Villegas joined Rosario Martínez's staff at Real Potosí. He then returned to Aurora as a youth coach, and later worked at Independiente de Quillacollo.

After a period at Wilstermann, Villegas returned to Aurora in 2004; initially a manager of the youth sides, he was named manager in March 2004 after Julio Zamora was sacked, but was dismissed in September and subsequently replaced by Juan Carlos Fernández.

Villegas returned to Aurora in 2005, again replacing Zamora, but was replaced by Luis Islas in April 2006. He then returned after Islas left, but was himself replaced in August by Luis Galarza.

In 2007, Villegas was hired by the Bolivian Football Federation, and was manager of their under-17 and under-20 sides. In 2010, he returned to Bolívar, working as manager of the youth categories, and spent the 2014 season in charge of Always Ready after they established a partnership with Bolívar to act as their "B" team.

On 25 April 2016, Villegas was named interim manager of Bolívar, replacing Rubén Darío Insúa. He returned to his previous role in May after the appointment of Beñat San José, and left the club in December 2018, as his youth role was occupied by Wálter Flores.

Villegas subsequently worked as an assistant of his brother at the Bolivia national team, Always Ready and Blooming. On 22 April 2022, he returned to Always, being named manager of the youth categories.

In September 2022, Villegas was named manager of Always Ready until the end of the season, after Julio César Baldivieso was sacked. He returned to his previous role after the season ended, but was again an interim in May, after Claudio Biaggio left; on 8 May 2023, he was permanently named manager of the club, but returned to the youth setup the following 30 March due to health issues.

On 19 July 2024, Villegas was appointed as manager of the Bolivia national team, taking over all categories.

== Managerial statistics ==
As of 17 November 2026

Managerial record by team and tenure
Team	Nat	From	To	Record							
Team	Nat	From	To	G	W	D	L	GF	GA	GD	Win %
Club Always Ready	(Bolivia)	15 March 2023	28 March 2024	29	14	7	8	47	39	+8	48.28
Bolivia	(Bolivia)	19 July 2024	Present	28	8	3	17	21	54	−33	28.57
Career total				57	22	10	25	68	93	−25	38.60

== Personal life ==
Villegas' older brother Eduardo was also a footballer, and is also a manager. Both played together at San José in 1994 and later worked together for three years.
