= C.D. San Antonio Bulo Bulo =

Bolivian football club

San Antonio Bulo Bulo
- Full name: Club Deportivo San Antonio Bulo Bulo
- Nickname: El Santo (The Saint)
- Founded: 31 October 1962; 64 years ago
- Ground: Estadio Dr. Carlos Villegas; Entre Ríos, Cochabamba, Bolivia
- Capacity: 17,000
- President: Juan Tardío
- Manager: Pedro Depablos
- League: División Profesional
- 2025: División Profesional, 4th of 16
Home colours	Away colours

Club Deportivo San Antonio Bulo Bulo is a Bolivian professional football club based in Entre Ríos, Cochabamba. Founded in 1962, they play in Primera División.

== History ==
Despite being founded on 31 October 1962, San Antonio Bulo Bulo won their first title in the Primera A AFC in 2021. They first appeared in the Copa Simón Bolívar in that year, being knocked out in the quarterfinals by García Agreda.

After winning the Primera A title again in 2022, the club qualified to the 2023 Copa Simón Bolívar. In that competition, they reached the finals, facing GV San José, but lost the title on penalties. Six days after losing the title, however, they achieved promotion to the Primera División for the first time ever, after winning the promotion/relegation play-offs against Libertad Gran Mamoré.

In their first participation in the top flight, San Antonio managed to reach the finals of the 2024 Apertura tournament, after advancing as runners-up in their group and defeating Bolívar in the quarter-finals and Independiente Petrolero in the semi-finals. In the final series, they beat Universitario de Vinto 3–2 on aggregate, thus qualifying for the championship final at the end of the season as well as the 2025 Copa Libertadores group stage.

== Current squad ==
As of 22 September 2026

Note: Flags indicate national team as defined under FIFA eligibility rules; some limited exceptions apply. Players may hold more than one non-FIFA nationality.

No.	Pos.	Nation	Player
1	GK	URU	Luca Giossa
4	DF	BOL	Luis Rodríguez
5	DF	BRA	Wagner Vidal
6	MF	BOL	Diego Mercado
8	MF	BOL	Kevin Merida
9	FW	COL	Jonathan Perea
10	MF	BOL	Adalid Terrazas
11	FW	COL	Carlos Preciado
12	GK	BOL	Leonardo Guzmán
13	FW	ARG	Alexi Medina
14	DF	BOL	Líder Yanarico
15	MF	BOL	Cristhian Machado
17	MF	BOL	Saulo Guerra
18	FW	BOL	Rafael Menacho

No.	Pos.	Nation	Player
19	FW	BOL	Marcelo De Lima
21	DF	BOL	Ramiro Ballivián
22	GK	PAR	Lucas Galarza
24	DF	BOL	Pablo Vaca
25	DF	COL	Huberth Sánchez
26	DF	BOL	César Romero
29	DF	BRA	Hallysson Padilha
30	DF	BOL	Jaime Villamíl
31	DF	BOL	Ronald Bustos
33	MF	BOL	Juan Magallanes
37	FW	BOL	Fernando Arispe
40	FW	BRA	João Pedro
45	MF	BOL	Sergio Villamíl
77	MF	BOL	Emanuel Aguilar

=== Out on loan ===
Note: Flags indicate national team as defined under FIFA eligibility rules; some limited exceptions apply. Players may hold more than one non-FIFA nationality.

No.	Pos.	Nation	Player

== Honours ==
- Bolivian Primera División
  - Runners-up (1): 2024

== Notable managers ==
- (Bolivia) Hugo Albarracín
- (Colombia) Diómedes Peña
- (Argentina) Julio Zamora
- (Brazil) Thiago Leitão
