= César Menacho (footballer) =

Bolivian footballer (born 1999)

Personal information
- Full name: César Alejandro Menacho Claros
- Date of birth: 9 August 1999 (age 27)
- Place of birth: Santa Cruz, Bolivia
- Height: 1.83 m (6 ft 0 in)
- Position: Forward

Team information
- Current team: Blooming
- Number: 27

Youth career
- Blooming

Senior career*
Years	Team	Apps	(Gls)
2018–2020	Blooming	45	(8)
2021–2022	Bolívar	13	(3)
2022	→ Jorge Wilstermann (loan)	22	(3)
2023–2024	Blooming	59	(18)
2025	Ħamrun Spartans	14	(2)
2025–	Blooming	16	(5)

International career^{‡}
2019	Bolivia U20	2	(0)
2020–	Bolivia	6	(0)
- * Club domestic league appearances and goals as of 30 December 2025 ‡ National team caps and goals as of 14 November 2024

César Alejandro Menacho Claros (born 9 August 1999) is a Bolivian professional footballer who plays as a forward for Bolivian Primera División club Blooming and the Bolivia national team.

== Club career ==
A youth academy graduate of Blooming, Menacho made his professional debut on 2 August 2018 in a 5–0 league win against Real Potosí. He scored his first goal on 15 April 2019 in a 4–2 win against Guabirá.

On 9 November 2020, Blooming and Bolivar announced that they have found an agreement for the transfer of Menacho.

On 8 January 2025, Maltese club Ħamrun Spartans announced the signing of Menacho.

== International career ==
Menacho was part of Bolivian squad at 2019 South American U-20 Championship and 2020 CONMEBOL Pre-Olympic Tournament.

Menacho made his senior team debut on 10 October 2020 in a 5–0 loss against Brazil.

== Career statistics ==
=== Club ===
As of 28 November 2020

Club	Season	League			Cup		Continental		Total	
Club	Season	Division	Apps	Goals	Apps	Goals	Apps	Goals	Apps	Goals
Blooming	2018	Bolivian Primera División	5	0	—		—		5	0
Blooming	2019	Bolivian Primera División	24	5	—		—		24	5
Blooming	2020	Bolivian Primera División	9	3	—		2	0	11	3
Career total			38	8	0	0	2	0	40	8

=== International ===
As of match played 14 November 2024

Appearances and goals by national team and year
National team	Year	Apps	Goals
Bolivia	2020	1	0
Bolivia	2021	0	0
Bolivia	2022	1	0
Bolivia	2023	0	0
Bolivia	2024	4	0
Total		6	0
