= Club Always Ready =

Association football club in Bolivia

Always Ready
- Full name: Club Deportivo Always Ready
- Nicknames: Albirrojo el Millonario la Banda Roja
- Founded: 13 April 1933; 93 years ago
- Ground: Estadio Municipal de El Alto
- Capacity: 25,000
- Chairman: Andrés Costa
- Manager: Julio César Baldivieso
- League: División Profesional
- 2025: División Profesional, 1st of 16
- Website: www.alwaysready.bo
| Home colours | Away colours | Third colours |

Club Deportivo Always Ready is a Bolivian football club from La Paz which plays its home games in nearby El Alto. Due to the jerseys the team is also known as La Banda Roja, or the red band.

== History ==
Club Always Ready was founded on 13 April 1933. The team took part in the La Paz championship, which was held in 1950 under semi-professional conditions; it was organized by La Paz Football Association (LPFA). Despite not having any official status, the winner of the tournament was widely considered the de facto champion of Bolivia. Always Ready earned their first title in 1951. In the following two years, the team was runner-up.

From 1954 onwards, teams from Cochabamba and Oruro participated in the now-called Torneo Integrado, a much larger tournament than the La Paz championship; Always Ready found themselves withdrawing from the competition as it found it difficult to retain key players. Always Ready's resurgence was not until 1956. The team secured its second national title in 1957.

Always Ready was the first Bolivian team to do a tour outside Bolivia: from August to November 1961, the club toured Europe.

In 1967, the club obtained second place in its national league; that allowed Always Ready to participate in South America's most prestigious club event: the Copa Libertadores. However, the results were disappointing as they went out in the first round without winning a single match. Nevertheless, Always Ready won that same year's city championship and finished 5th in the national standings.

In 1977 Always Ready was one of the founding members of the new national professional league, where it stayed until 1981, when they were relegated to the second division. They achieved promotion in 1987, but in 1991 they were relegated again and did not reach promotion until 2019, 28 years later.

In 2018, Always Ready returned to the top flight for the first time since 1991 by winning the Copa Simón Bolívar after beating Avilés Industrial 3–0 in the final.

In the 2019 Bolivian Primera División season, the club finished ninth in the Apertura, and fifth in the Clausura. These positions were good enough to finish seventh in the aggregate table and earn a spot in the 2020 Copa Sudamericana, their first continental competition in 32 years. They faced Millonarios in the first stage. The first leg in Bogotá ended in a 2–0 win for the Colombian team. In the second leg, which was played in La Paz, Always Ready won 1–0, being eliminated 2–1 on aggregate.

On New Years Eve 2020, Always Ready won the Torneo Apertura championship of the top-flight División Profesional after defeating Nacional Potosí 2–0 away from home in the last match of the season, their first top flight title in 63 years.

With this title, the club earned a spot in the 2021 Copa Libertadores group stage. Their first match was on 20 April 2021, a 2–0 win against Brazilian powerhouse Internacional at home. Their second match was a 2–1 loss to Olimpia in Paraguay. In the match against Deportivo Táchira on Venezuelan soil, Always Ready suffered a 7–2 defeat. In their last match, they drew against Internacional in Porto Alegre, however this was not enough to prevent their elimination from the competition where they finished last in their group.

In the 2021 season, Always Ready had another good season, finishing as runner-up one point behind champions Independiente Petrolero, and earning qualification to the 2022 Copa Libertadores in the process, where they finished last in the group stage again.

== Always Ready in CONMEBOL competitions ==
- Copa Libertadores: 5 appearances

1968 – Group stage
2021 – Group stage
2022 – Group stage
2023 – Second stage
2024 – Third stage

- Copa Sudamericana: 2 appearances

2020 – First stage
2024 – Knockout round play-offs

== Honours ==
=== National ===
- Bolivian Primera División
  - Winners (4): 1951, 1957, 2020 Apertura, 2025
- Bolivian Second Division
  - Winners (1): 2018

=== Regional ===
- Campeonato Paceño
  - Winners (7): 1951, 1957, 1959, 1968, 1986, 1993, 2018
- Campeonato de 2.ª Categoría
  - Winners (2): 1939, 1956
- Campeonato de 3.ª Categoría
  - Winners (1): 1938

== Current squad ==
As of 14 March, 2026

Note: Flags indicate national team as defined under FIFA eligibility rules; some limited exceptions apply. Players may hold more than one non-FIFA nationality.

| No. | Pos. | Nation | Player |
|---|---|---|---|
| 1 | GK | VEN | Alain Baroja |
| 2 | DF | BOL | José Herrera |
| 4 | DF | BOL | Nicolás Villarroel |
| 5 | MF | BOL | Alvaro Quiroga |
| 6 | MF | BOL | Rai Lima |
| 7 | MF | ARG | Joel Amoroso |
| 8 | MF | BOL | Juan Pablo Gomez |
| 9 | FW | ARG | Enrique Triverio |
| 10 | MF | BOL | Jesús Maraude |
| 11 | FW | BOL | Javier Uzeda |
| 12 | GK | BOL | Santiago Paz |
| 14 | DF | BOL | Damian Medina |

| No. | Pos. | Nation | Player |
|---|---|---|---|
| 17 | MF | BOL | Fernando Nava |
| 18 | DF | BOL | Carlitos Rodriguez |
| 19 | MF | BOL | Dario Torrico |
| 20 | MF | BOL | Fernando Saucedo |
| 21 | DF | COL | Alex Rambal |
| 22 | DF | BOL | Richet Gómez |
| 23 | FW | BOL | Juan Godoy |
| 24 | FW | BOL | Carmelo Algarañaz |
| 26 | DF | COL | Edisson Restrepo |
| 38 | DF | BOL | Santiago Cuestas |
| 99 | GK | BOL | Enzo Rodriguez |
| — | FW | PAR | Carlos Florenciañez |
