= C.A. Nacional Potosí =

Bolivian association football club

Nacional Potosí
- Full name: Club Atlético Nacional Potosí
- Nicknames: El Equipo del Pueblo; La Banda Roja; Pata Lados; Rancho Guitarras
- Founded: 8 April 1942; 84 years ago
- Ground: Estadio Víctor Agustín Ugarte
- Capacity: 32,000
- Chairman: Wilfredo Condori
- Manager: Leonardo Eguez
- League: División Profesional
- 2025: División Profesional, 7th of 16
- Website: sites.google.com/view/nacionalpotosi
Home colours	Away colours	Third colours

Club Atlético Nacional Potosí is a Bolivian football team from Potosí. The football team currently plays in the Bolivian Primera División. Founded on 8 April 1942, it plays its home games at Estadio Víctor Agustín Ugarte. Despite never winning the top flight, they have been a constant qualifier for the Copa Sudamericana.

Nacional has a basketball team as well.

== History ==
Nacional Potosí is one of Bolivia's oldest football clubs, being founded on 8 April 1942. The team has mainly played in the second tier of Bolivian football. In 2004 it came under the ownership of Emilio Alave and the team started to mount a serious promotion challenge, coming close in 2007 when they lost to Aurora in the relegation play-off. Nacional bounced back the following year and won the Copa Simon Bolívar, gaining promotion to the first division. In 2009 Nacional made its debut in the Liga de Fútbol Profesional Boliviano, but the club couldn't survive its first season and was relegated. In 2010, Wilfredo Condori took over as chairman and the side won both the Copa Simon Bolívar and promotion back to the first division. The club played its first ever Copa Sudamericana in 2014. They lost 1-3 on aggregate to Club Libertad of Paraguay in the first round. Celebrating its diamond anniversary in 2017, the side was playing in the first division and the Copa Sudamericana for just the second time in their history.

The club debuted in the Copa Libertadores in 2023 and was eliminated in the 1st stage.

== Stadium ==
The club plays its home games at Estadio Víctor Agustín Ugarte in Potosí. It has a capacity for 32,000 people.

The stadium was originally called Estadio San Clemente, but was renamed Mario Mercado Vaca Guzmán after some modifications on the structure, including new illumination towers, were made. Newer modifications led ultimately to its actual name.

Located 4,090 metres above sea level, the stadium is one of the highest in the world. It has raised numerous controversies in footballing circles, as its significant altitude affects the absorption of oxygen in the human body, offering considerable advantage to the home team who are more accustomed to such conditions.

== Current squad ==
As of 1 September 2025

Note: Flags indicate national team as defined under FIFA eligibility rules; some limited exceptions apply. Players may hold more than one non-FIFA nationality.

No.	Pos.	Nation	Player
1	GK	BOL	Saidt Mustafá
2	DF	BOL	Kevin Quiroz
3	DF	PAR	Nelson Amarilla
4	DF	BOL	Agustín Daza
5	DF	BOL	Daniel Mancilla
6	DF	COL	Edisson Restrepo
7	DF	BOL	Saúl Torres
8	MF	BOL	Luis Pavia
9	FW	COL	Tommy Tobar
10	FW	ARG	Agustín Mansilla
11	MF	BOL	Jorge Rojas
13	DF	BOL	Leonardo Montenegro
14	DF	BOL	Javier Guerra
15	MF	BOL	Jhojan Arce

No.	Pos.	Nation	Player
16	FW	BOL	Andrés Torrico
17	MF	BOL	Saulo Guerra
18	MF	BOL	Pedro Azogue
19	FW	ARG	Maximiliano Núñez
21	DF	BOL	Óscar Baldomar
22	MF	BOL	Diego Hoyos
23	GK	BOL	Pedro Galindo
24	MF	BOL	Luis Zeballos
25	DF	COL	Martín Payares
27	FW	BOL	Alfredo Garcia
28	FW	COL	Duban Palacio
29	FW	BOL	William Álvarez
30	FW	BOL	Kevin Torres
33	DF	BOL	Luis Demiquel

== Rivalries ==
The club has a rivalry with the only other first division club in the Potosí Department, Real Potosí. They share the same stadium, and matches between them usually draw lots of attention.

The first match played between the two clubs was in the 2009 Copa Aerosur on 18 January 2009. Real Potosi won 2-1. The first league match between the two clubs was on 19 April 2009, which finished in a 1-1 draw.

Although both clubs were founded in the 20th century, the reason why it took so long for both clubs to meet was because Nacional Potosi had been playing in the lower divisions until 2009. Nacional Potosí have won 18 times, while Real Potosí have only done it 15 times, there were 11 draws.

== Honours ==
=== National ===
- Copa Bolivia
  - Winners (1): 2025
- Bolivian Second Division
  - Winners (2): 2008, 2010

== International record ==
- Copa Libertadores: 1 appearance

Best: 2023 (1st stage)

- Copa Sudamericana: 7 appearances

Best: 2017, 2024 (2nd stage/Group stage)

== Managers ==
- (Argentina) Guillermo Álvaro Peña 2021
- (Bolivia) Roberto Mancilla 2021
- (Argentina) Flavio Robatto 2021
- (Bolivia) Alberto Illanes 2021
- (Argentina) Flavio Robatto 2022
- (Argentina) Víctor Hugo Andrada 2023
- (Argentina) Flavio Robatto 2023
- (Argentina) Claudio Biaggio 2024
- (Bolivia) Alberto Illanes 2024
