= The Strongest =

Association football club in Bolivia

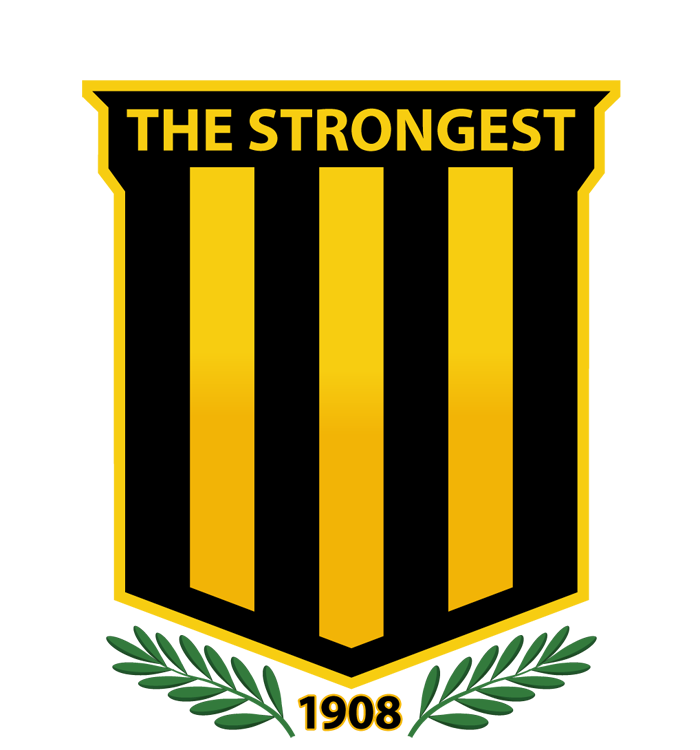
- Full name: Club The Strongest
- Nicknames: Tigre; Aurinegro; Gualdinegro; Decano
- Founded: 8 April 1908; 118 years ago
- Ground: Estadio Hernando Siles; Estadio Rafael Mendoza (select games)
- Capacity: 41,143; 14,000
- Chairman: Daniel Terrazas
- Manager: Eduardo Villegas
- League: División Profesional
- 2025: División Profesional, 3rd of 16
- Website: clubthestrongest.bo
Home colours	Away colours	Third colours

Club The Strongest is a Bolivian professional football club based in La Paz, that currently plays in the Bolivian Primera División.

Founded in 1908, their team colours are yellow and black. Although they have a home ground, Estadio Rafael Mendoza, (capacity: 15,000), they play most of their games at the Estadio Hernando Siles, Bolivia's national ground (capacity: 42,000). The club is the oldest active football club in Bolivia and the only team to have played continuously in the country's top division for longer than a century.

The club was well represented in the Bolivian squad at the 1994 FIFA World Cup, the last such tournament in which the national team participated, by Marcelo Torrico, Gustavo Quinteros, Óscar Sánchez and José Melgar.

== History ==
=== Early years ===
The Strongest was founded on 8 April 1908 by a group of 12 students who named the team, "The Strongest Football Club", or El Club Mas Fuerte in Spanish. Its first President and founder was José León López Villamil. Its first championship was in 1911, well before any of the current Bolivian teams had even been created.

In 1930, The Strongest became the first and only Bolivian team to win a League championship with no goals scored against them. The same year, The Strongest inaugurated the Estadio Hernando Siles, with a 4–1 victory against its classical rival (at the time), Universitario.

It is the only football team in the world to have a battle named after it. In the Chaco War (1932–1935) the players, staff and members of the club, which numbered around 600, enlisted in the Bolivian Army. A division largely composed of these "Stronguistas" played a vital part in the Bolivian Army's most important victory. As a result of that, the battle is named "Batalla de Cañada Strongest" in Bolivian history books.

The club was one of the founding members of the first professional Bolivia league in 1950, with all 9 clubs being from La Paz. With the 1952 Torneo Interdepartamental, the club won its first professional league championship.

The Strongest won the 1964 Copa Simon Bolívar, which gave it qualification for its first ever continental competition; the 1965 Copa Libertadores, at a time when only national champions entered the tournament. The club achieved Bolivia's first victory outside of the country on a club level, defeating Ecuador's Deportivo Quito. The team finished 2nd in its group that year, behind Argentina's Boca Juniors.

=== 1967–1981: Rafael Mendoza era ===
One of the greatest presidents in The Strongest's history, Rafael Mendoza was in charge of the club from 1967 to 1980. In that time, he dealt with the Viloco Tragedy and with many economic hardships.

Deeply affected by the Viloco Tragedy, Mendoza began to think into the future and wanted the club to have its own stadium. Under his command, the stadium was built from 1974 to 1986. Along with this, the complex was finished, which included tennis, racquetball, volleyball, and basketball courts. It also has a swimming pool and dining facilities.

"Don Rafo" is best remembered for his hard work in the Achumani Sports Complex and the club's stadium. Also, in this time, The Strongest achieved great national and international success. Some events to remember in his presidency are the visit by Pelé's Santos team in 1971, a game against Boca Juniors led by Antonio Roma and Silvio Marzolini, and many national championships including the formation of the Bolivian Professional Football League.

==== 1969: The Viloco tragedy ====
On 24 September 1969, a local holiday, the team was invited to participate in an exhibition game in Santa Cruz organized by Santa Cruz's football association; the team had played its last official match on 14 September, and the friendly game was part of a break from their local competition.

On 26 September, the day the team was due to return from Santa Cruz by plane, it was announced that the aircraft, a Lloyd Aéreo Boliviano DC-6, had disappeared carrying sixteen of the team's players, one player on loan, the coach and two other staff members. A day later, there was news that the plane had crashed near Viloco, a rural area between the Tres Cruces Peaks. All 69 passengers and five crew members died. The investigation could not determine a specific cause. Players Luis Gini, Marco Antonio Velasco, and Rolando Vargas were not on board the plane.

Members of the team who died in the crash were:

- (Paraguay) Armando Angelacio
- (Paraguay) Orlando Cáceres
- (Argentina) Hernán Andretta
- (Argentina) Héctor Marchetti
- (Argentina) Eduardo Arrigó
- (Argentina) Raúl Oscar Farfán
- (Bolivia) Julio Alberto Díaz
- (Bolivia) Oswaldo Franco
- (Bolivia) Ernesto Villegas
- (Bolivia) Jorge Durán
- (Bolivia) Angel Porta
- (Bolivia) Juan Iriondo
- (Bolivia) Oscar Guzmán (on loan from "Olympic" club in La Paz)
- (Bolivia) Jorge Tapia
- (Bolivia) Germán Alcázar
- (Bolivia) Oscar Flores
- (Bolivia) Diógenes Torrico
- Eustaquio Ortuño (coach)
- José Ayllón Guerra (manager)
- Felipe Aguilar (staff)

==== 1977: Inaugural league champion ====
In 1977, the club was one of the founding members of the Bolivian Professional Football League, and won the first edition.

From 1979 to 1981, the club finished as runner-ups three consecutive times.

=== 1982–2009: More titles and international campaigns ===
In 1986, the club won their fifth league title, same year in which their stadium opened. In 1989, they won the league title, and earned the right to play in the Copa Libertadores the following year: the 1990 Copa Libertadores, where the club was eliminated in the second round by Universidad Católica.

In 2003 the club won both tournaments of the year: Apertura and Clausura, becoming the first "Bicampeon" (two-time champion) of the new league format under Argentine manager Néstor Clausen. In that year's Copa Sudamericana, the club produced an upset by beating defending champions San Lorenzo, but were knocked out in the following round by São Paulo after a 7-2 aggregate loss.

In 2004 the club added another league title. In the 2005 Copa Sudamericana, with Eduardo Villegas as head coach, the club eliminated its classic rivals Bolívar 4–2 on aggregate. Later, the team went on to defeat Ecuador's LDU Quito – including a 3–0 victory in Quito. The Strongest was eliminated by Mexican side Pumas UNAM in the third round (round of 16) 4–3 on aggregate, who later went on to become runners-up to cup winners Boca Juniors.

=== 2010–present: Tricampeonato and Recent history ===
The club became the first "Tricampeon" (three-time champion) of Bolivian football following its 2013 Apertura league title under Bolivian manager Eduardo Villegas. Tigre had previously won the 2012 Apertura and Clausura tournaments.

In the 2014 Copa Libertadores, the club had a good campaign. They finished second in their group behind Athletico Paranaense to qualify for the round of 16, where they were narrowly eliminated after a penalty shootout by Defensor Sporting.

In the 2016 Copa Libertadores, The Strongest made its debut in the competition by historically beating São Paulo at Pacaembu Stadium 1–0 with a goal from Matías Alonso, earning their first Copa Libertadores away win in 34 years. Their last away win in the competition was a 3–2 victory against Técnico Universitario in April 1981. The club eventually placed third in the group with 8 points and 2 wins, 2 draws, and 2 losses.

In 2017 the club had another good run in the Copa Libertadores. The club entered the tournament in the second phase and beat Montevideo Wanderers 6–0 on aggregate. In the next phase, they disposed of Unión Española 6–1 on aggregate, including a 5–0 home victory which equalled their highest international win margin. Now in the group stage, The Strongest began the campaign by beating Santa Fe 2–0 in La Paz. Then they lost their only game of that group, 2–0 against Santos in Brazil. They went on to draw three more games while beating Sporting Cristal 5–1. The club finished second in the group and qualified for the round of 16 where they were eliminated 2–1 on aggregate by Lanús.

== Kit ==
The Strongest adopted the yellow and black stripes upon foundation in 1908. While looking for a proper uniform, a friend sent the founders a shirt from Germany that sported a dark green with horizontal, yellow stripes. Upon this, one of the founders commented on how a local bird, the Chayñita, had similar colours. The club adopted the idea and since 1908, the main outfit has been vertically striped yellow and black with a varying number of stripes.

The supplementary uniform has commonly been white with yellow and black, though there have been several other combinations such as a full yellow top and black shorts and even full yellow outfit.

It is sometimes claimed that the similarity to the kit of Peñarol of Montevideo, Uruguay is due to the fact that The Strongest lacked originality and imitated those colours. However, this theory is countered by the argument that Peñarol did not adopt a full striped kit until the 1911 season, and was an unknown team at the time (won 4 titles in its 24-year existence, up to that point).

== Performance in CONMEBOL competitions ==
- Copa Libertadores: 28 appearances

Best: second round in 1990, 1994, 2014, and 2017
1965 – first round
1971 – first round
1975 – first round
1978 – first round
1980 – first round
1981 – first round
1982 – first round
1987 – first round
1989 – group stage
1990 – second round
1994 – second round
2000 – group stage
2001 – group stage
2003 – group stage
2004 – group stage
2005 – group stage
2006 – group stage
2012 – group stage
2013 – group stage
2014 – round of 16
2015 – group stage
2016 – group stage
2017 – round of 16
2018 – group stage
2019 – second stage
2020 – second stage
2021 – group stage
2022 – group stage

- Copa Sudamericana: 4 appearances

2003 – quarter-finals
2005 – second round
2011 – first stage
2013 – first stage
2022 – round of 16

- Copa CONMEBOL: 2 appearances

1995 – first round
1997 – preliminary round

- Copa Merconorte: 2 appearances

1998 – group stage
1999 – group stage

== Honours ==
=== National ===
- Bolivian Primera División
  - Winners (16): 1952, 1964, 1974, 1977, 1986, 1989, 1993, 2003-A, 2003-C, 2004-C, 2011-A, 2012-C, 2012-A, 2013-A, 2016-A, 2023
- Copa República FBF
  - Winners (1): 1958

=== Regional ===
- Campeonato Paceño
  - Winners (19): 1914, 1916, 1917, 1922, 1923, 1924, 1925, 1930, 1935, 1938, 1943, 1945, 1946, 1952, 1963, 1964, 1970, 1971, 1974
- Copa 20 de Octubre AFLP
  - Winners (1): 1916
- Campeonato de 2.ª Categoría
  - Winners (1): 1914

== Records and other achievements ==
- First Bolivian team to win a game abroad in an official cup (1–0 in Ecuador against Deportivo Quito for the 1965 Copa Libertadores de América),
- Oldest Bolivian team, reaching the 100-year milestone playing in the top division,
- Oldest and one of two teams (with Oriente Petrolero), to have never been relegated,

== Current squad ==
As of 15 July 2026

Note: Flags indicate national team as defined under FIFA eligibility rules; some limited exceptions apply. Players may hold more than one non-FIFA nationality.

No.	Pos.	Nation	Player
1	GK	BOL	Rodrigo Banegas
2	DF	COL	José Moya
3	DF	BOL	Pablo Pedraza
4	DF	ARG	Martín Chiatti
5	DF	BOL	Adrián Jusino
6	MF	PAN	Jovani Welch (on loan from Alianza Panama)
7	MF	BOL	Kevin Romay
8	MF	BOL	Kevin Salvatierra
9	FW	DOM	Carlos Ventura
10	MF	BOL	Raúl Castro
12	GK	BOL	Diego Valdivia
14	FW	GUA	Darwin Lom
15	MF	BOL	Santiago Arce
16	MF	BOL	Víctor Cuellar
17	FW	COL	Adrián Estacio

No.	Pos.	Nation	Player
19	DF	BOL	Carlos Roca
21	FW	BOL	Fabricio Quaglio
22	DF	BOL	Widen Saucedo
23	GK	BOL	Sebastián Arismendi
25	MF	BOL	Jhosep Michel
26	FW	BOL	Gabriel Sotomayor
27	MF	BOL	Dilan Saavedra
29	DF	BOL	Yamil Portuncho
30	MF	BOL	Jaime Arrascaita
33	GK	BOL	Kioto Mendoza
34	MF	BOL	Santiago Melgar
36	MF	BOL	Roy Ribertt
37	MF	BOL	Pedro Espíritu

=== Out on loan ===
Note: Flags indicate national team as defined under FIFA eligibility rules; some limited exceptions apply. Players may hold more than one non-FIFA nationality.

No.	Pos.	Nation	Player
—	FW	BOL	José Flores (at Oriente Petrolero until 30 June 2027)

== Managers ==
- (Bolivia) Ramiro Blacut (1980–81)
- (Bolivia) Carlos Aragonés (1992–93)
- (Bolivia) Ramiro Blacut (1994)
- (Argentina) Mario Kempes (1999)
- (Argentina) Jorge Habegger (1 July 2000 – 30 June 2001)
- (Argentina) Néstor Clausen (1 January 2004 – 30 June 2004)
- (Bolivia) Víctor Hugo Antelo (2004)
- (Bolivia) Eduardo Villegas (2005)
- (Paraguay) Rolando Chilavert (6 September 2006–06)
- (Bolivia) Óscar Carmelo Sánchez (2007)
- (Bolivia) Félix Berdeja (2007 – 31 July 2007)
- (Bolivia) Eduardo Villegas (2007)
- (Colombia) Bernardo Redín (2008)
- (Argentina) Julio César Toresani (1 January 2009 – 30 May 2009)
- (Brazil) Sandro Coelho (2009–10)
- (Argentina) Néstor Craviotto (1 July 2010 – 30 June 2011)
- (Argentina) Néstor Clausen (15 January 2011 – 15 July 2011)
- (Bolivia) Mauricio Soria (21 June 2011 – 19 March 2012)
- (Bolivia) Úber Acosta (interim) (20 March 2012 – 23 March 2012)
- (Bolivia) Eduardo Villegas (23 March 2012–1?)
- (Argentina) Néstor Craviotto (5 June 2014–15)
- (Paraguay) Pablo Caballero (2015–16)
- (Bolivia) Mauricio Soria (2016)
- (Venezuela) César Farías (2016–2017)
- (Argentina) Carlos Ischia (5 January 2018 – 26 March 2018)
- (Venezuela) Cesar Farias (26 March 2018– December 2018)
- (Bolivia) Pablo Escobar (December 2018– August 2019)
- (Bolivia) Mauricio Soria (September 2019 - March 2020)
- (Bolivia) Alberto Illanes (April 2020 - April 2021)
- (Paraguay) Gustavo Florentin (April 2021 - August 2021)
- (Argentina) Christian Díaz (August 2021– August 2022)
- (Argentina) Claudio Biaggio (August 2022– December 2022)
- (Spain) Ismael Rescalvo (2023)
- (Portugal) Ricardo Formosinho (2023)
- (Bolivia) Pablo Cabanillas (2024)
- (Argentina) Pablo Lavallén (2024)
- (Spain) Ismael Rescalvo (2024)

== See also ==
- List of accidents involving sports teams
