= 2025 Copa Bolivia =

Tournament details
- Country: Bolivia
- Dates: 29 April – 22 December 2025
- Teams: 16

Final positions
- Champions: Nacional Potosí (1st title)
- Runners-up: Bolívar
- Copa Libertadores: Nacional Potosí

Tournament statistics
- Matches played: 134
- Goals scored: 461 (3.44 per match)

The 2025 Copa Bolivia, known as the 2025 Copa Paceña for sponsorship purposes, was the second edition of the Copa Bolivia, Bolivia's football cup competition, which was contested by the 16 teams that take part in the División Profesional for its 2025 season. The competition began on 29 April and ended on 22 December 2025.

Nacional Potosí were the champions, defeating Bolívar 4–3 on aggregate in the finals.

== Format ==
The competition, which was played concurrently with the 2025 División Profesional tournament, featured five stages: a group stage, a play-off round, quarter-finals, semi-finals, and finals. In the group stage, the 16 participating teams were drawn into four groups and played 14 matches, two against each one of their group rivals, as well as two against their derby rival (which was drawn into a different group) and six interzonal matches, facing one team from each of the other groups twice. The four group winners advanced to the quarter-finals, whilst the teams placing in second and third place in the four groups played a play-off round over two legs to decide the other four quarter-finalists, who faced the group winners in the quarter-finals. The two semi-final winners played the final, with the champions being awarded a berth into the 2026 Copa Libertadores and the runners-up qualifying for the 2026 Copa Sudamericana.

If teams tied in points after two legs in the play-off round, regardless of aggregate score or goal difference, a penalty shoot-out would played to decide the winning team, whilst for the other knockout rounds (quarter-finals, semi-finals, and final), a penalty shoot-out was held only if there was no winner by points or goal difference.

== Draw ==
The draw for the competition was held on 3 April 2025 in Santa Cruz de la Sierra. The 16 teams were drawn into four groups of four teams, being also assigned a row (1–4) within their group which decided which teams they played as interzonal rivals.

The draw resulted in the following groups:

Group A
| Row | Team |
|---|---|
| 1 | Bolívar |
| 2 | Nacional Potosí |
| 3 | Jorge Wilstermann |
| 4 | Blooming |

Group B
| Row | Team |
|---|---|
| 1 | Real Tomayapo |
| 2 | Real Oruro |
| 3 | The Strongest |
| 4 | Always Ready |

Group C
| Row | Team |
|---|---|
| 1 | San Antonio Bulo Bulo |
| 2 | ABB |
| 3 | GV San José |
| 4 | Aurora |

Group D
| Row | Team |
|---|---|
| 1 | Independiente Petrolero |
| 2 | Universitario de Vinto |
| 3 | Oriente Petrolero |
| 4 | Guabirá |

== Group stage ==
In the group stage, the 16 teams played 14 matches: six against their group rivals, two against their derby rival (which was drawn into a different group), as well as six against the teams that were drawn into the same row in the other groups.

=== Standings ===
==== Group A ====
| Pos | Team | Pld | W | D | L | GF | GA | GD | Pts | Qualification |
|---|---|---|---|---|---|---|---|---|---|---|
| 1 | Bolívar | 14 | 8 | 2 | 4 | 34 | 21 | +13 | 26 | Advance to Quarter-finals |
| 2 | Blooming | 14 | 7 | 3 | 4 | 28 | 20 | +8 | 24 | Advance to Play-off round |
| 3 | Nacional Potosí | 14 | 5 | 3 | 6 | 22 | 21 | +1 | 18 | Advance to Play-off round |
| 4 | Jorge Wilstermann | 14 | 4 | 3 | 7 | 18 | 28 | −10 | 15 | |

Source: FBF, Soccerway
Rules for classification: 1) Points, 2) Goal difference, 3) Goals for, 4) Away goals for, 5) Yellow cards, 6) Drawing of lots.

==== Group B ====
| Pos | Team | Pld | W | D | L | GF | GA | GD | Pts | Qualification |
|---|---|---|---|---|---|---|---|---|---|---|
| 1 | Real Oruro | 14 | 7 | 7 | 0 | 22 | 10 | +12 | 28 | Advance to Quarter-finals |
| 2 | Always Ready | 14 | 8 | 2 | 4 | 36 | 19 | +17 | 26 | Advance to Play-off round |
| 3 | The Strongest | 14 | 4 | 4 | 6 | 27 | 24 | +3 | 16 | Advance to Play-off round |
| 4 | Real Tomayapo | 14 | 3 | 3 | 8 | 21 | 44 | −23 | 12 | |

Source: FBF, Soccerway
Rules for classification: 1) Points, 2) Goal difference, 3) Goals for, 4) Away goals for, 5) Yellow cards, 6) Drawing of lots.

==== Group C ====
| Pos | Team | Pld | W | D | L | GF | GA | GD | Pts | Qualification |
|---|---|---|---|---|---|---|---|---|---|---|
| 1 | GV San José | 14 | 5 | 4 | 5 | 26 | 21 | +5 | 19 | Advance to Quarter-finals |
| 2 | Aurora | 14 | 5 | 3 | 6 | 24 | 29 | −5 | 18 | Advance to Play-off round |
| 3 | San Antonio Bulo Bulo | 14 | 5 | 2 | 7 | 23 | 24 | −1 | 17 | Advance to Play-off round |
| 4 | ABB | 14 | 3 | 2 | 9 | 16 | 31 | −15 | 11 | |

Source: FBF, Soccerway
Rules for classification: 1) Points, 2) Goal difference, 3) Goals for, 4) Away goals for, 5) Yellow cards, 6) Drawing of lots.

==== Group D ====
| Pos | Team | Pld | W | D | L | GF | GA | GD | Pts | Qualification |
|---|---|---|---|---|---|---|---|---|---|---|
| 1 | Guabirá | 14 | 7 | 4 | 3 | 25 | 25 | 0 | 25 | Advance to Quarter-finals |
| 2 | Oriente Petrolero | 14 | 6 | 4 | 4 | 24 | 24 | 0 | 22 | Advance to Play-off round |
| 3 | Universitario de Vinto | 14 | 5 | 4 | 5 | 22 | 20 | +2 | 19 | Advance to Play-off round |
| 4 | Independiente Petrolero | 14 | 5 | 0 | 9 | 19 | 26 | −7 | 15 | |

Source: FBF, Soccerway
Rules for classification: 1) Points, 2) Goal difference, 3) Goals for, 4) Away goals for, 5) Yellow cards, 6) Drawing of lots.

=== Results ===
| Home \ Away | ABB | CAR | AUR | BLO | BOL | GUA | GVS | IPE | WIL | NAC | ORI | TRO | RTO | SAB | STR | UVI |
|---|---|---|---|---|---|---|---|---|---|---|---|---|---|---|---|---|
| ABB | — | 1–2 | 1–2 | — | — | — | 2–1 | — | — | 1–3 | — | 1–2 | — | 3–1 | — | 0–0 |
| Always Ready | 5–1 | — | 4–2 | 4–2 | — | 4–0 | — | — | — | — | — | 1–1 | 6–0 | — | 2–1 | — |
| Aurora | 2–1 | 1–0 | — | 1–3 | — | 4–0 | 2–2 | — | 2–2 | — | — | — | — | 0–3 | — | — |
| Blooming | — | 1–2 | 4–1 | — | 1–1 | 1–1 | — | — | 2–0 | 2–0 | 4–1 | — | — | — | — | — |
| Bolívar | — | — | — | 3–1 | — | — | — | 2–3 | 1–2 | 2–1 | — | — | 5–1 | 1–0 | 1–0 | — |
| Guabirá | — | 3–2 | 2–1 | 3–2 | — | — | — | 3–1 | — | — | 3–3 | — | 2–2 | — | — | 2–0 |
| GV San José | 5–0 | — | 1–1 | — | — | — | — | — | 2–0 | — | 6–0 | 2–2 | — | 2–2 | 3–2 | — |
| Independiente Petrolero | — | — | — | — | 0–3 | 0–1 | — | — | — | 1–2 | 1–0 | — | 2–0 | 1–3 | — | 0–1 |
| Jorge Wilstermann | — | — | 1–3 | 1–2 | 3–2 | — | 1–0 | — | — | 1–3 | 0–0 | — | — | — | 2–5 | — |
| Nacional Potosí | 4–2 | — | — | 0–0 | 3–0 | — | — | 0–3 | 3–4 | — | — | 0–0 | — | — | — | 0–0 |
| Oriente Petrolero | — | — | — | 2–3 | — | 2–1 | 4–0 | 2–0 | 2–0 | — | — | — | — | — | 2–2 | 3–2 |
| Real Oruro | 1–1 | 1–1 | — | — | — | — | 4–1 | — | — | 1–0 | — | — | 2–0 | — | 1–1 | 3–0 |
| Real Tomayapo | — | 3–2 | — | — | 2–7 | 1–2 | — | 3–6 | — | — | — | 1–1 | — | 3–1 | 3–3 | — |
| San Antonio Bulo Bulo | 0–2 | — | 5–2 | — | 1–1 | — | 0–1 | 3–1 | — | — | — | — | 0–2 | — | — | 2–0 |
| The Strongest | — | 2–1 | — | — | 3–5 | — | 1–0 | — | 1–1 | — | 1–2 | 0–1 | 5–0 | — | — | — |
| Universitario de Vinto | 3–0 | — | — | — | — | 2–2 | — | 3–0 | — | 4–3 | 1–1 | 1–2 | — | 5–2 | — | — |

Source: FBF, Soccerway
Legend: Blue = home team win; Yellow = draw; Red = away team win.

== Knockout stage ==
=== Bracket ===
Play-off round
The Strongest | 2 | 2 | 4
Aurora | 2 | 1 | 1
Nacional Potosí | 3 | 1 | 4
Oriente Petrolero | 1 | 1 | 1
Universitario de Vinto | 0 | 1 | 1
Blooming | 0 | 3 | 4
San Antonio Bulo Bulo | 2 | 2 | 4
Always Ready | 1 | 2 | 1

Quarter-finals
The Strongest (p) | 2 | 2 | 4 (5)
Guabirá | 1 | 3 | 4 (4)
Nacional Potosí | 3 | 1 | 4
GV San José | 0 | 3 | 3
Blooming | 2 | 2 | 4
Real Oruro | 1 | 2 | 3
San Antonio Bulo Bulo | 0 | 1 | 1
Bolívar | 3 | 6 | 9

Semi-finals
The Strongest | 1 | 0 | 1
Nacional Potosí | 2 | 1 | 3
Blooming | 1 | 0 | 1
Bolívar | 1 | 5 | 6

Finals
Nacional Potosí | 0 | 4 | 4
Bolívar | 2 | 1 | 3

1. ^{†} For the play-off round, points over two legs are shown instead of aggregate score.

=== Play-off round ===
In the play-off round, if teams ended up tied in points after two legs, a penalty shootout would be held to decide the team that would advance to the following round of the competition.

| Team 1 | Points | Team 2 | 1st leg | 2nd leg |
|---|---|---|---|---|
| Universitario de Vinto | 1–4 | Blooming | 0–0 | 1–3 |
| San Antonio Bulo Bulo | 4–1 | Always Ready | 2–1 | 2–2 |
| The Strongest | 4–1 | Aurora | 2–2 | 2–1 |
| Nacional Potosí | 4–1 | Oriente Petrolero | 3–1 | 1–1 |

==== First leg ====
| 12 November 2025 | San Antonio Bulo Bulo | 2–1 | Always Ready | Cochabamba |
| 15:00 UTC−4 | Terrazas 43'; Vásquez 84' | Report | Andrade 63' | Stadium: Félix Capriles; Referee: Luis Villarroel |

| 12 November 2025 | Nacional Potosí | 3–1 | Oriente Petrolero | Potosí |
| 18:00 UTC−4 | W. Álvarez 41', 87'; Palacio 49' | Report | Hoyos 30' (o.g.) | Stadium: Víctor Agustín Ugarte; Referee: Ramiro Ticona |

| 12 November 2025 | The Strongest | 2–2 | Aurora | La Paz |
| 20:30 UTC−4 | Godoy 67'; Arrascaita 71' (pen.) | Report | Verdún 30', 75' | Stadium: Hernando Siles; Referee: Carlos Arteaga |

| 13 November 2025 | Universitario de Vinto | 0–0 | Blooming | Cochabamba |
| 19:00 UTC−4 | | Report | | Stadium: Félix Capriles; Referee: Mijahil López |

==== Second leg ====
| 15 November 2025 | Oriente Petrolero | 1–1 | Nacional Potosí | Santa Cruz de la Sierra |
| 15:00 UTC−4 | G. Álvarez 1' | Report | W. Álvarez 52' | Stadium: Real Santa Cruz; Referee: Dilio Rodríguez |

Nacional Potosí won 4–1 on points.

| 15 November 2025 | Always Ready | 2–2 | San Antonio Bulo Bulo | El Alto |
| 18:00 UTC−4 | Bobadilla 18'; Saucedo 28' | Report | Montenegro 73'; De Lima 76' | Stadium: Municipal de Villa Ingenio; Referee: Ronald Mamani |

San Antonio Bulo Bulo won 4–1 on points.

| 15 November 2025 | Aurora | 1–2 | The Strongest | Cochabamba |
| 20:30 UTC−4 | Ballivián 12' | Report | Arrascaita 37' (pen.); Chávez 45+5' | Stadium: Félix Capriles; Referee: Cristian Condori |

The Strongest won 4–1 on points.

| 16 November 2025 | Blooming | 3–1 | Universitario de Vinto | Santa Cruz de la Sierra |
| 15:00 UTC−4 | Centella 8'; Alaniz 26' (pen.), 57' (pen.) | Report | Cano 14' | Stadium: Real Santa Cruz; Referee: Guildo Quenta |

Blooming won 4–1 on points.

=== Quarter-finals ===
| Team 1 | Agg. | Team 2 | 1st leg | 2nd leg |
|---|---|---|---|---|
| San Antonio Bulo Bulo | 1–9 | Bolívar | 0–3 | 1–6 |
| Nacional Potosí | 4–3 | GV San José | 3–0 | 1–3 |
| Blooming | 4–3 | Real Oruro | 2–1 | 2–2 |
| The Strongest | 4–4 (5–4 p) | Guabirá | 2–1 | 2–3 |

==== First leg ====
| 18 November 2025 | Nacional Potosí | 3–0 | GV San José | Potosí |
| 18:00 UTC−4 | Álvarez 30'; Torrico 45+3'; Torres 90' | Report | | Stadium: Víctor Agustín Ugarte; Referee: José Quintanilla |

| 18 November 2025 | The Strongest | 2–1 | Guabirá | La Paz |
| 20:00 UTC−4 | Chiatti 30'; Chávez 70' | Report | Sánchez 72' | Stadium: Hernando Siles; Referee: Juan Carlos Huanca |

| 19 November 2025 | Blooming | 2–1 | Real Oruro | Santa Cruz de la Sierra |
| 15:00 UTC−4 | Valverde 74'; Menacho 90+3' | Report | Vallejos 68' | Stadium: Real Santa Cruz; Referee: Héctor Sandoval |

| 19 November 2025 | San Antonio Bulo Bulo | 0–3 | Bolívar | Cochabamba |
| 19:00 UTC−4 | | Report | Valencia 25' (o.g.); Jh. Velásquez 79'; Cauteruccio 85' | Stadium: Félix Capriles; Referee: Santiago Silva |

==== Second leg ====
| 25 November 2025 | Real Oruro | 2–2 (3–4 agg.) | Blooming | Oruro |
| 19:00 UTC−4 | Vila 23'; Zeballos 84' (pen.) | Report | Posse 61', 65' | Stadium: Jesús Bermúdez; Referee: Renán Castillo |

| 26 November 2025 | Guabirá | 3–2 (4–4 agg.) (4–5 p) | The Strongest | Montero |
| 15:00 UTC−4 | Rafinha 45+1'; Barco 81' (pen.), 90+5' (pen.) | Report | Godoy 47'; García 67' | Stadium: Gilberto Parada; Referee: Mijahil López |
| | Penalties |
| | Rafinha (penalty scored); Sánchez (penalty missed); Robles (penalty scored); Gil (penalty scored); Barco (penalty scored); Paredes (penalty missed) | | (penalty scored) García; (penalty scored) Barreto; (penalty missed) Moriceau; (penalty scored) Pedraza; (penalty scored) Chávez; (penalty scored) Quaglio |

| 26 November 2025 | GV San José | 3–1 (3–4 agg.) | Nacional Potosí | Oruro |
| 18:00 UTC−4 | Villamil 15'; Ceceri 30'; Arismendi 45+1' (pen.) | Report | Rojas 68' | Stadium: Jesús Bermúdez; Referee: Ángelo Maija |

| 26 November 2025 | Bolívar | 6–1 (9–1 agg.) | San Antonio Bulo Bulo | La Paz |
| 20:30 UTC−4 | Cataño 8'; E. Vaca 18', 45'; Melgar 62', 70'; Romero 71' | Report | Alonso 35' | Stadium: Hernando Siles; Referee: Jhonatan Mamani |

=== Semi-finals ===
| Team 1 | Agg. | Team 2 | 1st leg | 2nd leg |
|---|---|---|---|---|
| Blooming | 1–6 | Bolívar | 1–1 | 0–5 |
| The Strongest | 1–3 | Nacional Potosí | 1–2 | 0–1 |

==== First leg ====
| 16 December 2025 | Blooming | 1–1 | Bolívar | Santa Cruz de la Sierra |
| 16:05 UTC−4 | Villarroel 26' (pen.) | Report | Melgar 66' | Stadium: Real Santa Cruz; Referee: Gery Vargas |
Note: The kickoff for the match, originally scheduled for 15:00 local time, was delayed for an hour due to rain.

| 16 December 2025 | The Strongest | 1–2 | Nacional Potosí | La Paz |
| 19:00 UTC−4 | Arrascaita 20' (pen.) | Report | Torres 27'; A. García 45' (pen.) | Stadium: Hernando Siles; Referee: Dilio Rodríguez |

==== Second leg ====
| 18 December 2025 | Nacional Potosí | 1–0 (3–1 agg.) | The Strongest | Potosí |
| 18:00 UTC−4 | Rojas 83' | Report | | Stadium: Víctor Agustín Ugarte; Referee: Javier Revollo |

| 18 December 2025 | Bolívar | 5–0 (6–1 agg.) | Blooming | La Paz |
| 20:00 UTC−4 | Cauteruccio 9'; Jh. Velásquez 26'; Romero 34', 45', 73' | Report | | Stadium: Hernando Siles; Referee: Cristian Condori |

=== Finals ===
20 December 2025
18:00 UTC−4

| Nacional Potosí | 0–2 | Bolívar |
|---|---|---|
| | Report | Melgar 19'; Romero 35' |

Estadio Víctor Agustín Ugarte, Potosí
Referee: Jordy Alemán

22 December 2025
19:00 UTC−4

| Bolívar | 1–4 | Nacional Potosí |
|---|---|---|
| Cauteruccio 31' | Report | Álvarez 3'; Guerra 17' (pen.), 74'; Quiroz 79' |

Estadio Hernando Siles, La Paz
Referee: Ivo Méndez

Nacional Potosí won 4–3 on aggregate.

== See also ==
- 2025 FBF División Profesional
