= 2025 Club Bolívar season =

Club Bolívar
2025 season
- Manager: Flavio Robatto
- Stadium: Estadio Hernando Siles
- División Profesional: 2nd
- Copa Bolivia: Runners-up
- Copa Libertadores: Group stage
- Copa Sudamericana: Quarter-finals
- Top goalscorer: League: Fábio Gomes (6); All: Fábio Gomes (11)
- Biggest win: Bolívar 5–1 Jorge Wilstermann; Bolívar 5–1 Blooming; Bolívar 4–0 Cerro Porteño; Bolívar 4–0 Independiente Petrolero
- Biggest defeat: Cerro Porteño 4–2 Bolívar; Bolívar 1–3 GV San José

The 2025 season was the 100th year since the founding of Club Bolívar, and its 60th season competing in the Bolivian top-tier football division. During this season, the club took part in the Copa Bolivia, the Copa Libertadores, and the Copa Sudamericana.

== Transfers ==
=== In ===
Pos.	Player	Transferred from	Fee	Date	Source
DF	(Venezuela) Rubén Ramírez	(Peru) Cusco	Free	23 January 2025	
GK	(Bolivia) Diego Méndez	(Bolivia) Royal Pari	Free	26 March 2025	
MF	(Bolivia) Lucas Chávez	(Saudi Arabia) Al-Taawoun	Loan return	30 June 2025	
MF	(Colombia) Daniel Cataño	(Colombia) Millonarios	Undisclosed	3 July 2025	
DF	(Argentina) Santiago Echeverría	(Bolivia) Nacional Potosí	Undisclosed	9 July 2025	
DF	(Argentina) Ignacio Gariglio	(Peru) Deportivo Garcilaso	Undisclosed	9 July 2025	
FW	(Uruguay) Martín Cauteruccio	(Peru) Sporting Cristal	Undisclosed	10 July 2025	
MF	(Argentina) Damián Batallini	(Argentina) Argentinos Juniors	Loan	11 July 2025	

=== Out ===
Pos.	Player	Transferred to	Fee	Date	Source
DF	(Bolivia) Roberto Fernández	(Russia) Akron Tolyatti	Undisclosed	1 July 2025	
FW	(Brazil) Bruno Sávio	(Colombia) Millonarios	End of contract	1 July 2025	
FW	(Brazil) Fábio Gomes	(Mexico) Mazatlán	Released	1 July 2025	
MF	(Bolivia) Lucas Chávez	(Brazil) Volta Redonda	Undisclosed	9 August 2025	
DF	(Venezuela) Rubén Ramírez		Contract terminated	26 August 2025	

== Competitions ==
=== Overall record ===
Competition	First match	Last match	Starting round	Final position	Record							
Competition	First match	Last match	Starting round	Final position	Pld	W	D	L	GF	GA	GD	Win %
División Profesional	28 March 2025	14 December 2025	Matchday 1	2nd	30	21	5	4	82	32	+50	70.00
Copa Bolivia	1 May 2025	22 December 2025	Group stage	Runners-up	20	12	3	5	52	27	+25	60.00
Copa Libertadores	1 April 2025	28 May 2025	Group stage	Group stage	6	2	0	4	12	11	+1	33.33
Copa Sudamericana	17 July 2025	24 September 2025	Knockout round play-offs	Quarter-finals	6	4	1	1	12	3	+9	66.67
Total					62	39	9	14	158	73	+85	62.90

Source: Competitions

=== División Profesional ===
==== League table ====
Pos	Team	Pld	W	D	L	GF	GA	GD	Pts	Qualification or relegation
1	Always Ready (C)	30	22	5	3	91	34	+57	71	Qualification for Copa Libertadores group stage
2	Bolívar	30	21	5	4	82	32	+50	68	Qualification for Copa Libertadores group stage
3	The Strongest	30	21	1	8	77	48	+29	64	Qualification for Copa Libertadores first stage
4	San Antonio Bulo Bulo	30	13	7	10	62	54	+8	46	Qualification for Copa Sudamericana first stage
5	Blooming	30	14	4	12	53	56	−3	46	Qualification for Copa Sudamericana first stage

Source: Soccerway
Rules for classification: 1) Points, 2) Playoff game (only if needed to decide championship between two teams), 3) Goal difference, 4) Goals for, 5) Away goals for, 6) Yellow cards, 7) Drawing of lots.
(C) Champions

==== Results by round ====
Round	1	2	3	4	5	6	7	8	9	10	11	12	13	14	15
Ground	H	A	H	A	H	A	A	H	A	H	H	A	H	A	H
Result	W	L	W	W	W	W	W	L	D	D	L	D	W	P	W
Position	3	7	3	3	2	2	2	2	2	3	4	4			

Updated to match(es) played on 7 July 2025. Source:
A = Away; H = Home; W = Win; D = Draw; L = Loss

==== Matches ====
28 March 2025 1	Bolívar	3–1	CDT Real Oruro

5 April 2025 2	Real Tomayapo	2–1	Bolívar

12 April 2025 3	Bolívar	5–1	Jorge Wilstermann

20 April 2025 4	Guabirá	2–4	Bolívar

27 April 2025 5	Bolívar	5–1	Blooming

4 May 2025 6	ABB	0–3	Bolívar

11 May 2025 7	Club Aurora	0–2	Bolívar

24 May 2025 9	Universitario de Vinto	1–1	Bolívar	Cochabamba
15:00 UTC−4				Stadium: Estadio Félix Capriles

8 June 2025 8	Bolívar	1–3	GV San José	La Paz
17:15 UTC−4				Stadium: Estadio Hernando Siles

15 June 2025 10	Bolívar	2–2	Always Ready	La Paz
17:15 UTC−4				Stadium: Estadio Hernando Siles

22 June 2025 11	Bolívar	1–2	The Strongest	La Paz
15:00 UTC−4				Stadium: Estadio Hernando Siles

29 June 2025 12	Nacional Potosí	1–1	Bolívar	Potosí
15:00 UTC−4				Stadium: Estadio Víctor Agustín Ugarte

7 July 2025 13	Bolívar	4–0	Independiente Petrolero	La Paz
18:00 UTC−4	Justiniano 21'; Cataño 45+4'; Romero 72' (pen.), 90+4' (pen.)			Stadium: Estadio Hernando Siles

19 July 2025 15	Bolívar	1–0	Oriente Petrolero	La Paz
17:30 UTC−4	Sagredo 80'			Stadium: Estadio Hernando Siles

=== Copa Bolivia ===
==== Group stage ====
1 May 2025 1	Jorge Wilstermann	3–2	Bolívar	Cochabamba
17:30 UTC−4	Bobadilla 72' (pen.); Cáceres 84'; Robson 90+2'		Justiniano 6', (yellow card) 74' (yellow-red card) 86'; Romero 26' (pen.)	Stadium: Estadio Félix Capriles; Referee: Ivo Méndez

21 May 2025 2	Bolívar	3–1	Blooming	La Paz
20:30 UTC−4				Stadium: Estadio Hernando Siles; Referee: Carlos García

26 June 2025 3	Nacional Potosí	3–0	Bolívar	Potosí
18:00 UTC−4				Stadium: Estadio Víctor Agustín Ugarte; Referee: Gustavo Vera

10 July 2025 5	Bolívar	2–1	Nacional Potosí	La Paz
18:00 UTC−4	Romero 4'; Matheus 90+4'		Torres (red card) 37'; Mansilla 43'	Stadium: Estadio Hernando Siles

=== Copa Libertadores ===
==== Group stage ====
The draw ceremony was conducted on 17 March 2025.

Group G

Pos	Team	Pld	W	D	L	GF	GA	GD	Pts	Qualification
1	(Brazil) Palmeiras	6	6	0	0	17	4	+13	18	Advance to round of 16
2	(Paraguay) Cerro Porteño	6	2	1	3	7	11	−4	7	Advance to round of 16
3	(Bolivia) Bolívar	6	2	0	4	12	11	+1	6	Transfer to Copa Sudamericana
4	(Peru) Sporting Cristal	6	1	1	4	6	16	−10	4	

Source: CONMEBOL
Rules for classification: 1) Points; 2) Goal difference; 3) Goals scored; 4) Away goals scored; 5) CONMEBOL ranking.

1 April 2025 1	Cerro Porteño (Paraguay)	4–2	(Bolivia) Bolívar	Asunción
19:00 UTC−3				Stadium: Estadio General Pablo Rojas; Referee: Alexis Herrera (Venezuela)

9 April 2025 2	Bolívar (Bolivia)	3–0	(Peru) Sporting Cristal	La Paz
20:30 UTC−4				Stadium: Estadio Hernando Siles; Referee: Maximiliano Ramírez (Argentina)

24 April 2025 3	Bolívar (Bolivia)	2–3	(Brazil) Palmeiras	La Paz
18:00 UTC−4				Stadium: Estadio Hernando Siles; Attendance: 13,839; Referee: Leandro Rey Hilfer (Argentina)

7 May 2025 4	Sporting Cristal (Peru)	2–1	(Bolivia) Bolívar	Lima, Peru
21:00 UTC−5				Stadium: National Stadium; Referee: Carlos Betancur (Colombia)

15 May 2025 5	Palmeiras (Brazil)	2–0	(Bolivia) Bolívar	São Paulo, Brazil
19:00 UTC−3	Murilo 6'; Facundo Torres 12'			Stadium: Allianz Parque; Attendance: 28,381; Referee: Maximiliano Ramírez (Argentina)

28 May 2025 6	Bolívar (Bolivia)	4–0	(Paraguay) Cerro Porteño	La Paz
20:30 UTC−4				Stadium: Estadio Hernando Siles; Referee: Andrés Matonte (Uruguay)

=== Copa Sudamericana ===
==== Knockout round play-offs ====
16 July 2025 First leg	Bolívar (Bolivia)	3–0	(Chile) Palestino	La Paz
18:00 UTC−4	Robson Matheus 58'; Cauteruccio 90+10' (pen.); Melgar 90+13'	Report		Stadium: Estadio Hernando Siles; Attendance: 22,190; Referee: Flavio de Souza (Brazil)

23 July 2025 Second leg	Palestino (Chile)	0–3 (0–6 agg.)	(Bolivia) Bolívar	Santiago, Chile
18:00 UTC−4		Report	Cataño 24'; Sagredo 28'; Cauteruccio 66'	Stadium: Estadio Nacional Julio Martínez Prádanos; Referee: Derlis López (Paraguay)

==== Round of 16 ====
13 August 2025 First leg	Bolívar (Bolivia)	2–0	(Peru) Cienciano	La Paz
18:00 UTC−4	Cauteruccio 20'; Batallini 58'	Report		Stadium: Estadio Hernando Siles; Referee: Jhon Ospina (Colombia)

20 August 2025 Second leg	Cienciano (Peru)	0–2 (0–4 agg.)	(Bolivia) Bolívar	Cusco, Peru
17:00 UTC−5		Report	Cauteruccio 15' (pen.); Batallini 45+1'	Stadium: Estadio Garcilaso; Referee: Augusto Aragón (Ecuador)

==== Quarter-finals ====
17 September 2025 First leg	Bolívar (Bolivia)	2–2	(Brazil) Atlético Mineiro	La Paz, Bolivia
18:00 UTC−4	Robson Matheus 48'; Romero 88' (pen.)		Alexsander 45'; Vitor Hugo 45+6'	Stadium: Estadio Hernando Siles; Referee: Kevin Ortega (Peru)

24 September 2025 Second leg	Atlético Mineiro (Brazil)	1–0 (3–2 agg.)	(Bolivia) Bolívar	Belo Horizonte, Brazil
19:00 UTC−3	Bernard 90+1'	Report		Stadium: Arena MRV; Referee: Facundo Tello (Argentina)
