= Football at the 2017 Bolivarian Games =

2017 Bolivarian Games Football Tournament
Tournament details
- Dates: 15–21 November
- Teams: 5 (from 1 confederation)
- Venue(s): 1 (in 1 host city)

Tournament statistics
- Matches played: 12

The Bolivarian Games Football tournament started on 15 November and will end on 23 November. It is organised by CONMEBOL. Nations are represented by the under-17 age group national team.

== Squads ==
Bolivia	Colombia	Ecuador	El Salvador	Venezuela
Adalid Terrazas Abasto; Alan Siles Arana; Alejandro Valeriano Aguilera; Bruno Rivas Reyes; Carlos Mauricio Adorno Patiño; Daniel Rojas Céspedes; Ferddy Andrés Roca Vivancos; Franz Simón Gonzales Mejía; Jhon Elías García Sossa; Josué Limberth Mamani Tumiri; Luis Eduardo Demiquel Banegas; Miguel Ángel Bengolea Palacios; Mirko Tomianovic Becerra; Paolo Andrés Alcócer Rojas; Roler Ferrufino Arauz; Santiago Arce Añazgo; Sebastián Galindo Novillo; Wálter Emilio Antelo Ynclán	Andrés Felipe Balanta Cifuentes; Andrés Felipe Perea Castañeda; Christian Alfonso Andrade Olmedo; Daniel José Melo; Déiber Jair Caicedo Mideros; Deyman Andrés Cortés Herrera; Etilso José Martínez Palacio; Fabián Steven Ángel Bernal; Guillermo Alejandro Tegue Caicedo; Gustavo Adolfo Carvajal Gómez; Jaminton Leandro Campaz; Juan David Vidal Cubides; Juan Sebastián Peñaloza Ragga; Kevin Leonardo Mier Robles; Luis Miguel López González; Robert Andrés Mejía Navarrete; Thomas Gutiérrez Serna; Yadir Meneses Betancur	César Aymar Parra Rivera; Danny Javier Villigua Muentes; Fricson Álex Lastra Nazareno; Gerly Antovely Delgado Delgado; Gonzalo Jordy Plata Jiménez; Iván Marcelo Betancourt Villena; Jackson Gabriel Porozo Vernaza; Jhon Andrés Campos Santacruz; Joffre Javier Monroy Gruezo; Jordan Lenin Rezabala Anzules; Joseph Alejandro Espinoza Montenegro; Julio César Cárdenas Zúñiga; Kevin José Sambonino Terán; Luis Mateo Ortiz Lara; Samuel Andrés Perlaza Simisterra; Santiago Daniel Micolta Lastra; Wellington Moisés Ramírez Preciado; Yarol Ariel Tafur Bedoya	Allexon Saravia Zambrano; Andy Joao Escobar Alas; Christian Joby Barrillas Salgado; Cristian Noel Rivera García; Dennis José García Cornejo; Diego Alejandro Chévez García; Éver Hernán Guzmán Quintanilla; Fernando José Villalta Hernández; Geovanny Ernesto Ávila Azahar; Jorge Antonio Cruz Cortez; Kevin Alexander Menjívar Henríquez; Lisandro Rafael Mejía Canales; Mauricio Armando Gómez Guzmán; Melvin Adalberto Cruz Montesinos; Roberto Carlos López Cárcamo; Rodrigo Armando Santamaría Sánchez; Ronald Alexis Cerritos Castañeda; Tomas Liam Romero Keubler	Adrián Alejandro Zambrano Rondón; Brayan Enrique Palmezano Reyes; Carlos Raul Olses Quijada; Christian Frederick Makoun Reyes; Cristian Cásseres Jr.; Diego Alfonzo Luna Flores; Eduardo Enrique Fereira Peñaranda; Esli Samuel García Cordero; Johan Enrique Montes Quintero; Jorge Eliézer Echeverría Montilva; Jorge Luis Yriarte González; José David Barragán Romero; José Rafael Reyes González; Junior Alberto Moreno Paredes; Junior José Paredes Jaspe; Manuel Alejandro Godoy Torrealba; Marco Andrés Gómez Muzzatti; Miguel Alejandro Silva Jaimes

== Venue ==
Santa Marta	Estadio Sierra Nevada is located in Colombia
Estadio Sierra Nevada	Estadio Sierra Nevada is located in Colombia
Capacity: 16,000	Estadio Sierra Nevada is located in Colombia
11.207344980328°N 74.19663906097°W	Estadio Sierra Nevada is located in Colombia

== Group stage ==
Pos	Team	Pld	W	D	L	GF	GA	GD	Pts	Qualification
1	Ecuador	4	2	2	0	9	2	+7	8	Gold medal match
2	Colombia	4	2	2	0	4	1	+3	8	Gold medal match
3	Bolivia	4	1	2	1	6	7	−1	5	Bronze Medal Match
4	Venezuela	4	1	1	2	3	5	−2	4	Bronze Medal Match
5	El Salvador	4	0	1	3	3	10	−7	1	

Source: Bolivar Games
Rules for classification: 1) Points; 2) Goal difference; 3) Number of goals scored;
15 November 2017
13:30

Ecuador	2–2	Venezuela
Rezabala; Micolta	Report	Makoun; José David Barragán Romero

Estadio Sierra Nevada, Santa Marta
15 November 2017
15:30

Colombia	2–0	El Salvador
Robert Andrés Mejía Navarrete; Juan Sebastián Peñaloza Ragga	Report

Estadio Sierra Nevada, Santa Marta

16 November 2017
13:30

El Salvador	0–4	Ecuador
	Report	Rezabala 55', 65', 70'; Yarol Ariel Tafur Bedoya 60'

Estadio Sierra Nevada, Santa Marta
16 November 2017
15:30

Colombia	1–1	Bolivia
Cortés 90'	Report	García 70'

Estadio Sierra Nevada, Santa Marta

18 November 2017
13:30

Bolivia	2–0	Venezuela
Roca 60', 70'	Report

Estadio Sierra Nevada, Santa Marta
18 November 2017
15:30

Colombia	0–0	Ecuador
	Report

Estadio Sierra Nevada, Santa Marta

19 November 2017
13:30

Ecuador	3–0	Bolivia
Plata 35'; Joseph Alejandro Espinoza Montenegro 66'; Rezabala 76'	Report

Estadio Sierra Nevada, Santa Marta
19 November 2017
15:30

Venezuela	1–0	El Salvador
Manuel Alejandro Godoy Torrealba 37'	Report

Estadio Sierra Nevada, Santa Marta

21 November 2017
13:30

El Salvador	3–3	Bolivia
Roberto Carlos Lopez Carcamo 23'; Cerritos 34'; Dennis Jose Garcia Cornejo 45'	Report	Bengolea 26'; Roca 37', 96'

Estadio Sierra Nevada, Santa Marta
21 November 2017
15:30

Colombia	1–0	Venezuela
Campaz 43'	Report

Estadio Sierra Nevada, Santa Marta

== Medal stage ==
=== Bronze medal match ===
23 November 2017
13:30

Venezuela	2–0	Bolivia
Echeverria 13'; Esli Samuel Garcia Cordero 35'	Report

Estadio Sierra Nevada, Santa Marta

=== Gold medal match ===
23 November 2017
15:30

Colombia	2–2	Ecuador
Caicedo 60'; Ángel 90'	Report	Micolta 40'; Rezabala 90'
Penalties
Meneses (penalty scored); Ángel (penalty scored); Caicedo (penalty scored); Juan David Vidal Cubides (penalty missed); Juan Sebastian Peñaloza Ragga (penalty scored); Campaz (penalty scored)	5–4	(penalty scored) Porozo; (penalty scored) Kevin Jose Sambonino Teran; (penalty scored) Joseph Alejandro Espinoza Montenegro; (penalty scored) Yarol Ariel Tafur Bedoya; (penalty missed) Plata; (penalty missed) Gerly Antovely Delgado Delgado

Estadio Sierra Nevada, Santa Marta
