= Yomar Rocha =

Bolivian association football player (born 2003)

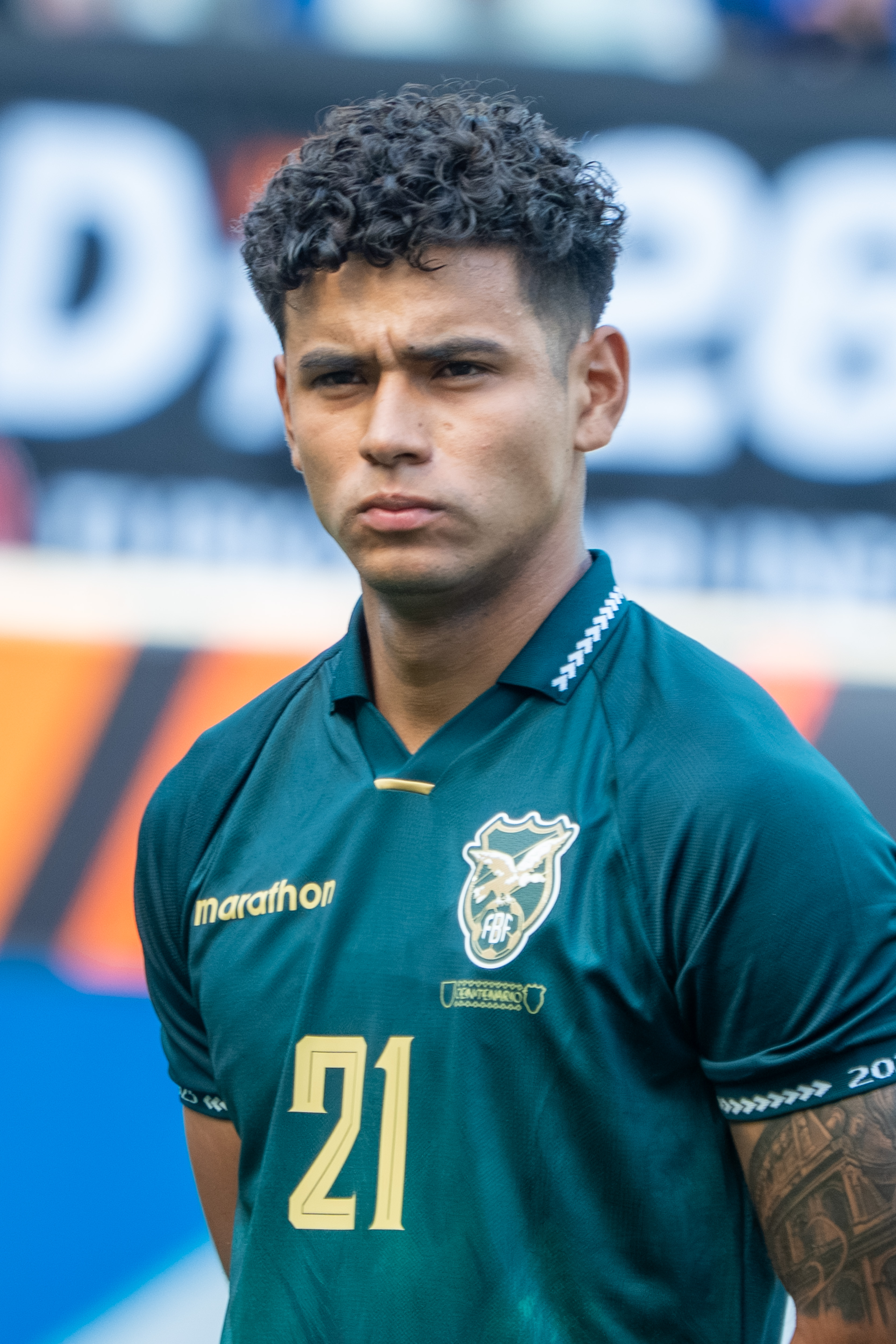
- Rocha with Bolivia in 2026

Personal information
- Full name: Yomar René Rocha Rodriguez
- Date of birth: 21 June 2003 (age 23)
- Height: 1.77 m (5 ft 9 1/2 in)
- Position: Defender

Team information
- Current team: Akron Tolyatti
- Number: 2

Youth career
- –2021: Bolivar

Senior career*
Years	Team	Apps	(Gls)
2021–2025	Bolivar	77	(8)
2025–	Akron Tolyatti	24	(1)

International career^{‡}
2023	Bolivia U20	4	(0)
2024–	Bolivia U23	3	(0)
2024–	Bolivia	19	(0)
- * Club domestic league appearances and goals as of 21 November 2026 ‡ National team caps and goals as of 17 November 2026

Yomar René Rocha Rodríguez (born 21 June 2003) is a Bolivian professional footballer who plays as a defender for Russian club Akron Tolyatti and the Bolivia national team.

== Club career ==
Rocha came through the youth ranks of Club Bolívar. He made his debut in the club's first team on November 19, 2021, against Independiente Petrolero.

On 11 September 2025, Rocha signed with Russian Premier League club Akron Tolyatti.

== International career ==
He was selected for the Bolivia U20 side for the 2023 South American U-20 Championship. He was called up to the senior Bolivia national football team for their March 2024 friendly matches. He made his senior debut on 23 March 2024 against Algeria.

== Career statistics ==
=== Club ===
As of 21 November 2026

Club	Season	League			Cup		Continental		Other		Total	
Club	Season	Division	Apps	Goals	Apps	Goals	Apps	Goals	Apps	Goals	Apps	Goals
Bolívar	2021	Bolivian Primera División	3	0	–		–		–		3	0
Bolívar	2022	Bolivian Primera División	19	2	–		0	0	3 (Note: Appearances in Apertura play-off)	0	22	2
Bolívar	2023	Bolivian Primera División	9	2	–		0	0	6 (Note: Appearances in Copa de la División Profesional)	1	15	3
Bolívar	2024	Bolivian Primera División	31	3	–		6 (Note: Appearances in Copa Libertadores)	0	3 (Note: Two appearances in Apertura play-offs, one appearance in Clausura play-offs)	0	40	3
Bolívar	2025	Bolivian Primera División	15	1	6 (Note: Appearances in Copa Bolivia)	0	9 (Note: Six appearances in Copa Libertadores, three appearances in Copa Sudamericana)	0	–		30	1
Bolívar	Total		77	8	6	0	15	0	12	1	110	9
Akron Tolyatti	2025–26	Russian Premier League	14	0	2	0	–		2 (Note: Appearances in relegation play-offs)	0	18	0
Akron Tolyatti	2026–27	Russian Premier League	10	1	4	0	–		–		14	1
Akron Tolyatti	Total		24	1	6	0	0	0	2	0	32	1
Career total			101	9	12	0	15	0	14	1	142	10

=== International ===
As of match played 17 November 2026

Appearances and goals by national team and year
National team	Year	Apps	Goals
Bolivia	2024	6	0
Bolivia	2025	7	0
Bolivia	2026	6	0
Total		19	0

== Honours ==
Bolivar

- FBF División Profesional: 2024
- Copa de la División Profesional: 2023
