= Adrián Pacheco =

Canadian soccer player (born 2005)

Adrian Pacheco
Personal information
- Full name: Adrian Pacheco Gordillo
- Date of birth: July 2, 2005 (age 21)
- Place of birth: Cochabamba, Bolivia
- Height: 1.77 m (5 ft 10 in)
- Position: Midfielder

Team information
- Current team: Club Aurora

Youth career
- Dinamo

Senior career*
Years	Team	Apps	(Gls)
–2022	Universitario de Vinto	0	(0)
2023–2025	Wilstermann	26	(1)
2025	Blooming	0	(0)
2025–2026	Atlético-GO	0	(0)
2026-present	Club Aurora	0	(0)

International career^{‡}
- Bolivia U15
2024	Canada U20	1	(0)
- * Club domestic league appearances and goals ‡ National team caps and goals as of 18 June 2024

Adrian Pacheco Gordillo (born 2 July 2005) is a soccer player who plays as a midfielder for Club Aurora.

== Early life ==
Pacheco was born on 2 July 2005. Born in Cochabamba, Bolivia, he grew up in Canada.

== Club career ==
As a youth player, Pacheco joined the youth academy of Croatian side Dinamo. Following his stint there, he signed for Bolivian side Universitario de Vinto, where he made zero league appearances and scored zero goals.

Subsequently, he signed for Bolivian side Wilstermann in 2023, where he made twenty-six league appearances and scored one goal. During the summer of 2025, he signed for Bolivian side Blooming, where he made zero league appearances and scored zero goals. The same year, he signed for Brazilian side Atlético-GO.
