= Marcelo Claros =

Bolivian footballer and manager (born 1964)

Personal information
- Full name: Mario Marcelo Claros Enriquez
- Date of birth: 12 July 1964 (age 62)
- Place of birth: Cochabamba, Bolivia
- Height: 5 ft 7 in (1.70 m)
- Position: Midfielder

Senior career*
Years	Team	Apps	(Gls)
1988–1990	Washington Diplomats		

Managerial career
- 2002–2005: Independiente Cochabamba
- 2007–2009: Jorge Wilstermann (youth)
- 2007–2008: Jorge Wilstermann (caretaker)
- 2009–2011: Arauco Prado
- 2013–2015: Aurora (youth)
- 2015–2016: Aurora
- 2016–2018: Bata
- 2019–2021: Cochabamba FC
- 2021–2022: Universitario de Vinto
- 2023: Real Mizque
- 2024: Petrolero
- 2025: Union Tarija
- * Club domestic league appearances and goals

Mario Marcelo Claros Enriquez (born 12 July 1964) is a Bolivian football manager and former player who played as a midfielder.

== Career ==
After notably playing for the American side Washington Diplomats, Claros subsequently became a manager. He began his career in 2002 with Independiente Cochabamba, leaving in 2005, and joined Jorge Wilstermann in 2007 as a manager of the youth categories.

Claros was an interim manager of Wilstermann on two occasions, in 2007 and 2008. He also managed the Cochabamba regional team in the latter year, before being named manager of Arauco Prado in 2009.

In 2013, Claros joined Aurora as a youth manager, before being named in charge of the first team in 2015. He was dismissed in the following year.

Claros subsequently managed Bata, Cochabamba FC and Universitario de Vinto, helping the latter side in their first-ever promotion to the Primera División in 2021. On 19 December of that year, he was maintained in charge of the side for the 2022 season.

Claros left La U on 26 May 2022, as the club opted not to extend his contract.
