= William Álvarez (footballer) =

Bolivian footballer (born 1995)

Willan Álvarez
Personal information
- Full name: Willan Gustavo Álvarez Vargas
- Date of birth: 15 September 1995 (age 31)
- Place of birth: Santa Cruz de la Sierra, Bolivia
- Height: 1.84 m (6 ft 0 in)
- Position: Forward

Team information
- Current team: Nacional Potosí
- Number: 29

Senior career*
Years	Team	Apps	(Gls)
2016-2017	Real Potosi	2	(0)
2017-2018	Guabirá	28	(4)
2019	Club Aurora	46	(15)
2020	Jorge Wilstermann	17	(6)
2021	Guabirá	10	(0)
2022	Nacional Potosi	26	(8)
2023	Universitario de Vinto	22	(6)
2024-	Nacional Potosi	67	(15)

International career
2020-	Bolivia	2	(0)
- * Club domestic league appearances and goals as of 00:15 (UTC) 27 May 2026

Willan Gustavo Álvarez Vargas (born 15 September 1995) is a Bolivian professional footballer who plays in Bolivian Primera División for Nacional Potosi.

== Club career ==
Álvarez made his professional debut in 2016 with Real Potosí. He then went on to Guabirá, Club Aurora, Jorge Wilstermann and Universitario de Vinto.

Alvarez signed for C.A. Nacional Potosí in 2024. The following year, he was top scorer for Nacional Potosí and leading scorer in the 2025 Copa Bolivia, form which led him to be called up for the Bolivia international team.

== International career ==
He made his debut for the full Bolivian side on the 27 March 2021, against Chile. He featured for the national team again on 18 January 2026 against Panama in a 1–1 draw.

== Personal life ==
From Santa Cruz de la Sierra, he is the brother of soccer players Gilbert Álvarez and Sebastián Álvarez.
