= William Álvarez =

William Álvarez may refer to:

- William Álvarez (footballer) (born 1995), Bolivian international footballer
- William Álvarez (tennis) (1934–2022), Colombian-Spanish tennis coach
