= List of foreign Liga Panameña de Fútbol players =

This is a list of foreign players in Liga Panameña de Fútbol. The following players:

1. have played at least one official game for their respective clubs.
2. are listed as squad members for the current .
3. have not been capped for the Panama national team at any level.
4. includes uncapped players with dual nationality.

In italic: Players currently signed, but have yet to play a league match.

In Bold: Current foreign Primera División de Fútbol Profesional. players and their present team.

== Africa (CAF) ==
=== Cameroon ===
- Bengue Guillaume – Plaza Amador

=== Equatorial Guinea ===
- Rolan De La Cruz – Arabe Unido
- Carlos Bejarano – Arabe Unido

=== Nigeria ===
- Frank Nedu Ejiofor – Tauro FC
- Kizito Obi – Tauro FC

== South America (CONMEBOL) ==
=== Argentina ===
- Gianni Baggini – Chepo FC
- Daniel Brizuela – Tauro FC
- Rodrigo Caballero – Plaza Amador
- Claudio Cáceres – San Francisco F.C.
- Juan Cano – Santa Gema
- Gianfranco Cao – Universitario
- Julio Capretta – Plaza Amador
- Rodrigo Cariara – Atletico Veragüense
- Ruben Cecco – Plaza Amador
- Ariel Celebroni – Chorrillo FC
- Daniel Cragnolini – Tauro FC
- Cristian Fabbiani – Universitario
- Pablo Gallardo – Tauro FC
- Martín Grioni – Chorrillo FC
- Guillermo Mairana – San Francisco F.C.
- Abel Marcovecchio – Independiente
- Claudio "Gallo" Martinez –
- Diego Myers – Plaza Amador
- Ricardo Oviedo – Chorrillo FC
- Nicolás Parodi – Plaza Amador
- Pablo Romero – Tauro FC, Arabe Unido, San Francisco FC
- Daniel Suárez –
- Victor Suarez – San Francisco F.C., Sporting San Miguelito, Plaza Amador
- Juan Tamburelli – Tauro FC
- Norberto Urbani – Plaza Amador
- Santiago Valdés – Chorrillo FC

=== Bolivia ===
- Daniel Camacho - Independiente

=== Brazil ===
- Felipe Bender Borowski –
- Caio José Milan – Chorillo FC
- Tiago Piaí –
- Leandro Cristian Rodrígues do Amaral "Safira" – Plaza Amador
- Ovidio Dos Santos – Tauro FC
- Flavinho da Silva – Plaza Amador
- Roberto Almeida Da Silva –

=== Colombia ===
- Ferney Agrono – Tauro FC
- Santiago De Alba – San Francisco FC
- Gustavo Alvarez – Arabe Unido
- Alexander Amut- Tauro FC
- Yustin Arboleda – Chorillo FC
- Wanegre Delgado de Armas –
- Jairo León Arias – San Francisco FC
- José Arias – Alianza FC
- Johann de Ávila – San Francisco FC
- Fredy Arizala – San Francisco FC
- Christian Banguera – Chepo FC
- Manuel Bocanegra – Chepo FC
- Ariel Bonilla – Chorillo, Plaza Amador, Tauro FC
- Álvaro Borja – Atlético Veragüense
- James Cabezas – Tauro Fc
- Lid Carabali – Plaza Amador
- Nilson Castañeda – Tauro FC
- Mauricio Castaño – Alianza
- Johan Cerón – Arabe Unido
- Gustavo Chara – Tauro FC
- Jan Contreras – Tauro FC
- Adalberto Córdoba – Tauro FC
- Rolan de la Cruz – Árabe Unido
- Ánderson Diaz – Atlético Chiriquí
- Jeffrey Díaz – San Francisco FC
- Miguel Duque – Chepo FC
- Javier Dussan – Tauro Fc
- Andres Escobar – Chorillo
- Oliver Fula – UDUniversitario
- Jesus Gamboa – Municipal Chorillo
- Rubén Gamboa – San Francisco FC
- Faber Gil – Arabe Unido
- Deivis Granados – San Francisco FC, Atletico Chiriqui
- Edwin Grueso – Alianza
- Jorge Henriquez – Chorillo
- Reinel Herrera – Tauro FC
- Ignacio Francisco Herrera –
- Alejandro Hincapié – Arabe Unido
- Diego Hoyos – Arabe Unido
- Emerson Hurtado – San Francisco FC
- Richard Ibargüen – Tauro FC
- Jose Julio – Atlético Veragüense
- Wilmer Largacha – Sporting San Miguelito
- David Loaiza – Chorillo
- Anderson Lobón – Chepo FC
- Dorian López – Tauro FC, San Francisco FC
- Alberto Manotas – Tauro FC, San Francisco FC
- Joan Melo – Tauro FC
- Alexander Moreno – Chepo FC
- Carlos Mosquera – Tauro FC
- Johnatan Mosquera – Arabe Unido
- Julian Munoz – Chorillo
- Steven Munoz – Chepo FC
- Jose Murillo – Plaza Amador
- Manuel Murillo – Atletico Nacional
- Pablo César Murillo – Atlético Chiriquí
- Gerardo Negrete – Independiente, Alianza
- Marlon Negrete – San Francisco FC
- William Negrete – San Francisco FC
- Edwin Ocampo Osorio – Municipal Chorillo
- Juan Osorio – Alianza FC
- Miguel Alonso Pacheco – La Previsora (San Francisco FC)
- Jean Carlos Palacios- Sporting 89 (Sporting San Miguelitto)
- Ezequiel Palomeque – Plaza Amador
- Eder Paredes – Alianza FC
- Cristian Pérez – San Francisco FC
- Luis José Pérez – San Francisco FC
- Robyn Pertuz – Alianza
- Héctor Nazarith – Tauro FC
- Gonzalo Quintero –
- John Wilson Raigosa – Arabe Unido
- Jhonny Ríos – Tauro Fc
- Juan Manuel Rodríguez – La Previsora (San Francisco FC)
- Jhoan Romero – Santa Gema
- Rodrigo Ruiz – Arabe Unido
- Víctor Hugo Saavedra – La Previsora (San Francisco FC)
- Victor Sanchez – Alianza FC
- Jorge Sandoval – Sporting San Miguelito
- Andres Santamaria – Plaza Amador, Atletico Nacional
- Milton Segura – Santa Gema
- Carlos Sierra – Tauro FC
- Alvaro Hernán Silva – Sporting San Miguelito
- Santiago Silvera – Atlético Veragüense
- Jhon Solis- Tauro FC
- Miguel Solis – San Francisco FC
- Varcán Sterling – Tauro FC, San Francisco FC
- Lucas Arias Tirado – Alianza FC
- Miguel Torres – San Francisco FC
- Leandro Trujillo – Municipal Chorillo
- David Uribe – Independiente
- John Valencia – Sporting 89 (Sporting San Miguelitto)
- Juan Carlos Velazco –
- Carlos Vilarete – San Francisco FC
- Jefferson Viveros – San Francisco FC
- Francisco Wittingham -La Previsora (San Francisco FC)
- Pablo Zamora – Alianza FC
- Jorge Zapata – Arabe Unido
- Yezid Zapata – San Francisco FC

=== Ecuador ===
- Pablo Ochoa – Sporting San Miguelito
- Geovanny Salinas – Plaza Amador

=== Paraguay ===
- Julio Castillo – Chepo FC, Plaza Amador
- Diego González - Club Deportivo del Este
- Ramiro Bernal - Club Deportivo del Este
- Víctor Benítez - Club Deportivo del Este
- Lucien Galtier - Club Deportivo del Este
- Fernando Lesme - Club Deportivo del Este

=== Peru ===
- Pablo Cotito Arias –
- Rafael Lecca –
- Raúl Mamani –
- Roger Meoño –
- Juan Pretel – Tauro FC
- Alberto Párraga - AFC EuroCrikers
- Sebastián Moran - FC Santa Gema, Sporting San Miguelito y New York FC

=== Uruguay ===
- David Uribe - San Francisco FC
- Felipe Villalba - Veraguas CD

=== Venezuela ===
- Daniel Blanco -Plaza Amador
- Jose Peraza – Tauro FC
- Frank Piedrahita – Plaza Amador

== North & Central America, Caribbean (CONCACAF) ==
=== Belize ===
- Ryan Simpson – Atlético Chiriquí
- Woodrow West – Atlético Chiriquí.

=== Costa Rica ===
- Luis Carlos Acuña – Árabe Unido
- Carlos Barahona – Alianza FC
- Luis Corrales – San Francisco FC
- Erick Araya Godines – Atlético Chiriquí
- Wilson Lopez – Alianza FC
- Eddy Basilio Rojas – Árabe Unido

=== Dominican Republic ===
- Erick Ozuna – Árabe Unido
- Jonathan Faña – Árabe Unido
- Miguel Lloyd – Árabe Unido

=== El Salvador ===
- Rusvel Saravia – San Francisco FC

=== Honduras ===
- Maynor Suazo – Atletico Veragüense
- José Reyes – San Francisco FC

=== Mexico ===
- José Luis Navas – Tauro FC
- Felipe Villanueva – La Previsora (San Francisco FC)
- Tomás Villanueva – La Previsora (San Francisco FC)

=== Nicaragua ===
- Juan Barrera – Tauro FC
- Raúl Leguías – Municipal Colon, Sporting San Miguelito, Plaza Amador, Tauro FC, Arabe Unido
- Axel Villanueva – Tauro FC

== Asia (AFC) ==
=== Japan ===
- Yuske Kubota – Plaza Amador
- Osodo Nobuya – Plaza Amador
- Iroki Ueno – Plaza Amador

== Europe (UEFA) ==
=== Italy ===
- Marcos Casagrande – Arabe Unido
- Giacomo Ratto – Tauro FC

=== Spain ===
- Fernando Murcia – Eurokickers FC
- José Raposeiras – EuroKickers FC
- Ismael Remacha – Plaza Amador
- Michel Salgado – Chorillo
