= Francisco Argüello =

Paraguayan footballer

Francisco Arguello
Personal information
- Full name: Francisco Antonio Argüello Benitez
- Date of birth: 4 June 1980 (age 46)
- Place of birth: Villarrica, Paraguay
- Height: 1.75 m (5 ft 9 in)
- Position: Midfielder

Team information
- Current team: Mineros Potosí (manager)

Senior career*
| Years | Team | Apps | (Gls) |
| 2006–2008 | Real Mamoré | 69 | (11) |
| 2009–2012 | Oriente Petrolero | 61 | (7) |
| 2012–2013 | Blooming | 28 | (2) |
| 2013 | Deportivo Capiatá | 2 | (0) |
| 2013–2014 | San José | 12 | (0) |
| 2023 | Deportivo Recoleta | | |

Managerial career
- 2014: Wilstermann (assistant)
- 2015: Universitario de Sucre (assistant)
- 2015–2016: Bolivia (assistant)
- 2017: Carabobo (assistant)
- 2017–2018: Palestine (assistant)
- 2019: Always Ready (assistant)
- 2020: Aurora
- 2022: Aurora
- 2022: Universitario de Sucre
- 2023: Deportivo Recoleta
- 2024: Destroyers
- 2025: Guaireña
- 2025: Pastoreo
- 2026–: Mineros Potosí
- * Club domestic league appearances and goals

Francisco Antonio Argüello Benitez (born 12 August 1982) is a Paraguayan football manager and former player who played as a midfielder. He is the current manager of Bolivian club Mineros Potosí.

Argüello spent most of his career playing for several clubs in the Liga de Fútbol Profesional Boliviano.

== Club career ==
Argüello joined Real Mamoré in 2006 at the age of 26, and played 35 games for the team during his first year. In 2007, he was named Best Player for Real Mamore, as he helped the club to avoid relegation.

Argüello then signed with Oriente Petrolero in 2009, where in his 1st season he helped the team to qualify for Copa Sudamericana. On 21 September of that year, suffered a double break of his lower right leg during an away match against Colombia's Deportes Tolima in Copa Sudamericana. As Argüello tried to shoot on goal, Tolima's defender John Hurtado attempted to block the shot with his foot. Hurtado caught Argüello on the shin with the sole of his foot as Argüello struck the shot, and the combined force of Argüello swinging leg and Hurtado's lunging block caused Argüello's Tibia and Fibua to break. Currently, the extent of the damage is unknown and no return date has been set for Argüello. Hurtado received a yellow card for the foul.

In June 2012, Argüello signed for Blooming.

== Coaching career ==
Argüello functioned as an assistant manager under Julio César Baldivieso in several clubs. In December 2019, he was officially appointed manager of Aurora, this time with Baldi as his assistant. Baldivieso could not appear as a coach in the official matches, after he already led Club Always Ready in the current 2019 Bolivian Primera División season and, according to the rules, a head coach cannot lead to two clubs in the same contest. For that reason, Argüello was appointed manager.
