= Daniel Camacho =

Bolivian footballer (born 1998)

Personal information
- Full name: Daniel Alejandro Camacho Almanza
- Date of birth: 15 October 1998 (age 28)
- Place of birth: La Paz, Bolivia
- Height: 1.78 m (5 ft 10 in)
- Position: Midfielder

Team information
- Current team: Universitario de Vinto
- Number: 8

Youth career
- Bolívar

Senior career*
Years	Team	Apps	(Gls)
2016	Bolívar	1	(0)
2016–2018	The Strongest	9	(0)
2019–2021	Aurora	10	(1)
2021–2022	CAI La Chorrera	21	(2)
2022–2024	The Strongest	8	(0)
2022	Universidad de San Martín (loan)	4	(0)
2023	Blooming (loan)	3	(0)
2023	Blooming	0	(0)
2023–	Universitario de Vinto	72	(9)

International career^{‡}
2015	Bolivia U17	4	(0)
2018	Bolivia U21	1	(0)
2021–	Bolivia	2	(0)
- * Club domestic league appearances and goals as of 30 December 2025 ‡ National team caps and goals as of 5 September 2024

Daniel Alejandro Camacho Almanza (born 15 October 1998) is a Bolivian footballer who plays for Universitario de Vinto as a Midfielder.

== Club career ==
Born in La Paz, Camacho started his career in Bolívar. He made his Primera División debut on 26 May 2016 against Sport Boys Warnes, coming in as a substitute for Juanmi Callejón in the 84th minute. In 2016, he signed to The Strongest, where he won the Liga de Fútbol Profesional Boliviano, playing only 1 match. On 26 January 2019 fellow Bolivian team Aurora signed him.

On 1 March 2021, he officially joined Panamanian outfit CAI La Chorrera.

== International career ==
Camacho made his debut in Bolivia national under-17 football team on 7 March 2015 in the group stage of 2015 South American U-17 Championship against Uruguay, playing 45 minutes. He was included in Bolivia's provisional squad for 2019 Copa América released on 15 May 2019. He later joined the U-21 side, playing only one game, a friendly defeat to the Netherlands 1–4.

In November 2021, he was called up to the senior side for the first time by César Farías in the friendly game against El Salvador, making his debut in the injury time of the second half.

== Career statistics ==
=== International ===
As of match played 5 September 2024

Appearances and goals by national team and year
National team	Year	Apps	Goals
Bolivia	2021	1	0
Bolivia	2024	1	0
Total		2	0

== Honours ==
- Bolivian Primera División: 2016–17
