= Sebastián Álvarez (footballer) =

Bolivian football player (born 2001)

Sebastián Álvarez Vargas
Personal information
- Full name: Sebastián Álvarez
- Date of birth: 29 August 2001 (age 25)
- Place of birth: Santa Cruz de la Sierra, Bolivia
- Height: 1.89 m (6 ft 2 in)
- Position: Centre-back

Team information
- Current team: PSBS Biak

Senior career*
Years	Team	Apps	(Gls)
2021–	Oriente Petrolero	107	(0)
2025–	→ PSBS Biak (loan)	0	(0)

International career^{‡}
2024–	Bolivia	1	(0)
- * Club domestic league appearances and goals as of 27 May 2026 ‡ National team caps and goals as of 31 May 2024

Sebastián Álvarez Vargas (born 29 August 2001) is a Bolivian professional footballer who plays as a centre-back for Liga 1 club PSBS Biak, on loan from Bolivian Primera División club Oriente Petrolero, and the Bolivia national team.

== Club career ==
He trained at the trained at the Tahuichi Academy prior to signing with Oriente Petrolero in August 2020. He made his league debut in 2021. He missed playing time during the 2022 season with injury, he made his debut in the Copa Sudamerica in 2022 with Oriente Petrolero and scored his first competitive goal for the club against Brazilian side Fluminese on 27 May 2022. He played in the competition again during the 2023 season.

== International career ==
In November 2020 he was called up to the Bolivia U20 squad. the following year he was called up to the senior Bolivia national football team, and was an unused substitute in a friendly match against El Salvador on 6 November 2021.

Álvarez finally makes his debut for Bolivia on 31 May 2024 in a friendly match against Mexico. Taking place at Chicago's Soldier Field, the match would see his side fall 1–0.

== Personal life ==
He is the younger brother of soccer players Gilbert Álvarez and William Álvarez.

== Career statistics ==
=== International ===
As of match played 31 May 2024

Appearances and goals by national team and year
National team	Year	Apps	Goals
Bolivia	2024	1	0
Total		1	0
