= 2014 FIFA World Cup qualification (CONMEBOL) =

Tournament details
- Dates: 7 October 2011 – 15 October 2013
- Teams: 9 (from 1 confederation)

Tournament statistics
- Matches played: 72
- Goals scored: 201 (2.79 per match)
- Attendance: 2,647,470 (36,770 per match)
- Top scorer(s): (Uruguay) Luis Suárez (11 goals)

The South American Zone of 2014 FIFA World Cup qualification saw nine teams competing for 4 or 5 berths in the finals. Brazil automatically qualified for the World Cup as the host nation so were not involved in CONMEBOL qualifying. Argentina, Colombia, Chile, Ecuador and Uruguay advanced to the World Cup.

== Format ==
The format for CONMEBOL's 2014 World Cup qualifying tournament was identical to the previous four editions. All CONMEBOL national teams played against each other twice on a home-and-away basis in a single group for 4 or 5 allotted berths. The top four teams automatically qualified for the finals. The fifth-placed team competed in the intercontinental play-offs against the fifth-placed team from the AFC's World Cup qualifying tournament. The order of matches was identical to that of the 2002, 2006 and 2010 tournaments. As Brazil qualified automatically as hosts, each team had a bye on the date they would normally have been scheduled to play Brazil.

== Standings ==
| Pos | Team | Pld | W | D | L | GF | GA | GD | Pts | Qualification | (Argentina) | (Colombia) | (Chile) | (Ecuador) | (Uruguay) | (Venezuela) | (Peru) | (Bolivia) | (Paraguay) |
|---|---|---|---|---|---|---|---|---|---|---|---|---|---|---|---|---|---|---|---|
| 1 | Argentina | 16 | 9 | 5 | 2 | 35 | 15 | +20 | 32 | 2014 FIFA World Cup | — | 0–0 | 4–1 | 4–0 | 3–0 | 3–0 | 3–1 | 1–1 | 3–1 |
| 2 | Colombia | 16 | 9 | 3 | 4 | 27 | 13 | +14 | 30 | 2014 FIFA World Cup | 1–2 | — | 3–3 | 1–0 | 4–0 | 1–1 | 2–0 | 5–0 | 2–0 |
| 3 | Chile | 16 | 9 | 1 | 6 | 29 | 25 | +4 | 28 | 2014 FIFA World Cup | 1–2 | 1–3 | — | 2–1 | 2–0 | 3–0 | 4–2 | 3–1 | 2–0 |
| 4 | Ecuador | 16 | 7 | 4 | 5 | 20 | 16 | +4 | 25 | 2014 FIFA World Cup | 1–1 | 1–0 | 3–1 | — | 1–0 | 2–0 | 2–0 | 1–0 | 4–1 |
| 5 | Uruguay | 16 | 7 | 4 | 5 | 25 | 25 | 0 | 25 | Inter-confederation play-offs | 3–2 | 2–0 | 4–0 | 1–1 | — | 1–1 | 4–2 | 4–2 | 1–1 |
| 6 | Venezuela | 16 | 5 | 5 | 6 | 14 | 20 | −6 | 20 | | 1–0 | 1–0 | 0–2 | 1–1 | 0–1 | — | 3–2 | 1–0 | 1–1 |
| 7 | Peru | 16 | 4 | 3 | 9 | 17 | 26 | −9 | 15 | | 1–1 | 0–1 | 1–0 | 1–0 | 1–2 | 2–1 | — | 1–1 | 2–0 |
| 8 | Bolivia | 16 | 2 | 6 | 8 | 17 | 30 | −13 | 12 | | 1–1 | 1–2 | 0–2 | 1–1 | 4–1 | 1–1 | 1–1 | — | 3–1 |
| 9 | Paraguay | 16 | 3 | 3 | 10 | 17 | 31 | −14 | 12 | | 2–5 | 1–2 | 1–2 | 2–1 | 1–1 | 0–2 | 1–0 | 4–0 | — |

Source: FIFA

== Matches ==
The matches were played from 7 October 2011 to 15 October 2013.

=== Matchday 1 ===
7 October 2011
17:00 UTC−2

| Uruguay | 4–2 | Bolivia |
|---|---|---|
| Suárez 3'; Lugano 25', 71'; Cavani 34' | Report | Cardozo 17'; Moreno 87' (pen.) |

Estadio Centenario, Montevideo
Attendance: 25,500
Referee: Víctor Hugo Carrillo (Peru)

7 October 2011
16:05 UTC−5

| Ecuador | 2–0 | Venezuela |
|---|---|---|
| J. Ayoví 15'; C. Benítez 28' | Report |

Estadio Olímpico Atahualpa, Quito
Attendance: 32,278
Referee: Enrique Osses (Chile)

7 October 2011
20:10 UTC−3

| Argentina | 4–1 | Chile |
|---|---|---|
| Higuaín 7', 52', 63'; Messi 25' | Report | Fernández 59' |

Estadio Monumental Antonio Vespucio Liberti, Buenos Aires
Attendance: 26,161
Referee: Wilmar Roldán (Colombia)

7 October 2011
20:15 UTC−5

| Peru | 2–0 | Paraguay |
|---|---|---|
| Guerrero 46', 71' | Report |

Estadio Nacional, Lima
Attendance: 40,000
Referee: Sergio Pezzotta (Argentina)

=== Matchday 2 ===
11 October 2011
16:00 UTC−4

| Bolivia | 1–2 | Colombia |
|---|---|---|
| Flores 85' | Report | Pabón 48'; Falcao 90+3' |

Estadio Hernando Siles, La Paz
Attendance: 33,155
Referee: Carlos Amarilla (Paraguay)

11 October 2011
19:45 UTC−3

| Chile | 4–2 | Peru |
|---|---|---|
| Ponce 2'; Vargas 18'; Medel 48'; Suazo 63' (pen.) | Report | Pizarro 49'; Farfán 60' |

Estadio Monumental David Arellano, Santiago
Attendance: 39,000
Referee: Raúl Orosco (Bolivia)

11 October 2011
19:45 UTC−3

| Paraguay | 1–1 | Uruguay |
|---|---|---|
| Ortiz 90+2' | Report | Forlán 68' |

Estadio Defensores del Chaco, Asunción
Attendance: 12,922
Referee: Wilson Seneme (Brazil)

11 October 2011
20:20 UTC−4:30

| Venezuela | 1–0 | Argentina |
|---|---|---|
| Amorebieta 62' | Report |

Estadio José Antonio Anzoátegui, Puerto La Cruz
Attendance: 35,600
Referee: Roberto Silvera (Uruguay)

=== Matchday 3 ===
11 November 2011
17:00 UTC−3

| Argentina | 1–1 | Bolivia |
|---|---|---|
| Lavezzi 60' | Report | Moreno 55' |

Estadio Monumental Antonio Vespucio Liberti, Buenos Aires
Attendance: 27,592
Referee: Carlos Vera (Ecuador)

11 November 2011
20:00 UTC−3

| Uruguay | 4–0 | Chile |
|---|---|---|
| Suárez 42', 45', 67', 73' | Report |

Estadio Centenario, Montevideo
Attendance: 40,500
Referee: Héctor Baldassi (Argentina)

11 November 2011
19:00 UTC−5

| Colombia | 1–1 | Venezuela |
|---|---|---|
| Guarín 11' | Report | F. Feltscher 78' |

Estadio Metropolitano Roberto Meléndez, Barranquilla
Attendance: 43,953
Referee: Omar Ponce (Ecuador)

11 November 2011
21:00 UTC−3

| Paraguay | 2–1 | Ecuador |
|---|---|---|
| Riveros 47'; Verón 57' | Report | J. R. Rojas 90+2' |

Estadio Defensores del Chaco, Asunción
Attendance: 11,173
Referee: Hernando Buitrago (Colombia)

=== Matchday 4 ===
15 November 2011
16:00 UTC−5

| Colombia | 1–2 | Argentina |
|---|---|---|
| Pabón 44' | Report | Messi 61'; Agüero 83' |

Estadio Metropolitano Roberto Meléndez, Barranquilla
Attendance: 49,600
Referee: Sálvio Fagundes (Brazil)

15 November 2011
16:00 UTC−5

| Ecuador | 2–0 | Peru |
|---|---|---|
| Méndez 69'; C. Benítez 88' | Report |

Estadio Olímpico Atahualpa, Quito
Attendance: 34,481
Referee: Jorge Larrionda (Uruguay)

15 November 2011
20:30 UTC−3

| Chile | 2–0 | Paraguay |
|---|---|---|
| Contreras 28'; M. Campos 86' | Report |

Estadio Nacional, Santiago
Attendance: 44,726
Referee: Héber Lopes (Brazil)

15 November 2011
20:30 UTC−4:30

| Venezuela | 1–0 | Bolivia |
|---|---|---|
| Vizcarrondo 25' | Report |

Estadio Polideportivo de Pueblo Nuevo, San Cristóbal
Attendance: 33,351
Referee: Georges Buckley (Peru)

=== Matchday 5 ===
2 June 2012
15:00 UTC−3

| Uruguay | 1–1 | Venezuela |
|---|---|---|
| Forlán 38' | Report | Rondón 84' |

Estadio Centenario, Montevideo
Attendance: 57,000
Referee: Antonio Arias (Paraguay)

2 June 2012
16:10 UTC−4

| Bolivia | 0–2 | Chile |
|---|---|---|
| | Report | Aránguiz 45+2'; Vidal 83' |

Estadio Hernando Siles, La Paz
Attendance: 34,389
Referee: Alfredo Intriago (Ecuador)

2 June 2012
19:30 UTC−3

| Argentina | 4–0 | Ecuador |
|---|---|---|
| Agüero 19'; Higuaín 29'; Messi 31'; Di María 76' | Report |

Estadio Monumental Antonio Vespucio Liberti, Buenos Aires
Attendance: 50,000
Referee: Víctor Hugo Rivera (Peru)

3 June 2012
17:00 UTC−5

| Peru | 0–1 | Colombia |
|---|---|---|
| | Report | J. Rodríguez 51' |

Estadio Nacional, Lima
Attendance: 34,866
Referee: Néstor Pitana (Argentina)

=== Matchday 6 ===
9 June 2012
16:00 UTC−4

| Bolivia | 3–1 | Paraguay |
|---|---|---|
| Peña 9'; Escobar 69', 80' | Report | Riveros 81' |

Estadio Hernando Siles, La Paz
Attendance: 17,320
Referee: Roberto Silvera (Uruguay)

9 June 2012
18:05 UTC−4:30

| Venezuela | 0–2 | Chile |
|---|---|---|
| | Report | Fernández 85'; Aránguiz 90+1' |

Estadio José Antonio Anzoátegui, Puerto La Cruz
Attendance: 35,000
Referee: Hernando Buitrago (Colombia)

10 June 2012
15:30 UTC−3

| Uruguay | 4–2 | Peru |
|---|---|---|
| Suárez 15'; Pereira 29'; C. Rodríguez 62'; Eguren 90+3' | Report | Godín 40' (o.g.); Guerrero 47' |

Estadio Centenario, Montevideo
Attendance: 55,000
Referee: Leandro Vuaden (Brazil)

10 June 2012
16:00 UTC−5

| Ecuador | 1–0 | Colombia |
|---|---|---|
| C. Benítez 53' | Report |

Estadio Olímpico Atahualpa, Quito
Attendance: 37,353
Referee: Wilson Seneme (Brazil)

=== Matchday 7 ===
7 September 2012
15:30 UTC−5

| Colombia | 4–0 | Uruguay |
|---|---|---|
| Falcao 2'; T. Gutiérrez 47', 51'; Zúñiga 90' | Report |

Estadio Metropolitano Roberto Meléndez, Barranquilla
Attendance: 45,000
Referee: Héber Lopes (Brazil)

7 September 2012
16:00 UTC−5

| Ecuador | 1–0 | Bolivia |
|---|---|---|
| Caicedo 73' (pen.) | Report |

Estadio Olímpico Atahualpa, Quito
Attendance: 32,213
Referee: Juan Soto (Venezuela)

7 September 2012
20:10 UTC−3

| Argentina | 3–1 | Paraguay |
|---|---|---|
| Di María 3'; Higuaín 30'; Messi 64' | Report | Fabbro 17' (pen.) |

Estadio Mario Alberto Kempes, Córdoba
Attendance: 51,000
Referee: Wilson Seneme (Brazil)

7 September 2012
20:25 UTC−5

| Peru | 2–1 | Venezuela |
|---|---|---|
| Farfán 47', 59' | Report | Arango 42' |

Estadio Nacional, Lima
Attendance: 54,998
Referee: Martín Vázquez (Uruguay)

=== Matchday 8 ===
11 September 2012
16:30 UTC−3

| Chile | 1–3 | Colombia |
|---|---|---|
| Fernández 41' | Report | J. Rodríguez 58'; Falcao 73'; T. Gutiérrez 76' |

Estadio Monumental David Arellano, Santiago
Attendance: 38,000
Referee: Víctor Hugo Carrillo (Peru)

11 September 2012
18:30 UTC−3

| Uruguay | 1–1 | Ecuador |
|---|---|---|
| Cavani 66' | Report | Caicedo 7' (pen.) |

Estadio Centenario, Montevideo
Attendance: 38,000
Referee: Carlos Amarilla (Paraguay)

11 September 2012
19:25 UTC−4

| Paraguay | 0–2 | Venezuela |
|---|---|---|
| | Report | Rondón 45', 67' |

Estadio Defensores del Chaco, Asunción
Attendance: 13,680
Referee: Enrique Osses (Chile)

11 September 2012
20:25 UTC−5

| Peru | 1–1 | Argentina |
|---|---|---|
| Zambrano 21' | Report | Higuaín 37' |

Estadio Nacional, Lima
Attendance: 54,721
Referee: Wilmar Roldán (Colombia)

=== Matchday 9 ===
12 October 2012
16:00 UTC−4

| Bolivia | 1–1 | Peru |
|---|---|---|
| Chumacero 51' | Report | Mariño 21' |

Estadio Hernando Siles, La Paz
Attendance: 46,500
Referee: Carlos Vera (Ecuador)

12 October 2012
15:30 UTC−5

| Colombia | 2–0 | Paraguay |
|---|---|---|
| Falcao 52', 89' | Report |

Estadio Metropolitano Roberto Meléndez, Barranquilla
Attendance: 45,000
Referee: Sergio Pezzotta (Argentina)

12 October 2012
16:00 UTC−5

| Ecuador | 3–1 | Chile |
|---|---|---|
| Caicedo 33', 56' (pen.); Castillo 90+2' | Report | Paredes 25' (o.g.) |

Estadio Olímpico Atahualpa, Quito
Attendance: 32,600
Referee: Héber Lopes (Brazil)

12 October 2012
21:00 UTC−3

| Argentina | 3–0 | Uruguay |
|---|---|---|
| Messi 65', 79'; Agüero 74' | Report |

Estadio Malvinas Argentinas, Mendoza
Attendance: 31,997
Referee: Leandro Vuaden (Brazil)

=== Matchday 10 ===
16 October 2012
16:00 UTC−4

| Bolivia | 4–1 | Uruguay |
|---|---|---|
| Saucedo 5', 50', 54'; Mojica 26' | Report | Suárez 80' |

Estadio Hernando Siles, La Paz
Attendance: 25,402
Referee: Víctor Hugo Rivera (Peru)

16 October 2012
17:30 UTC−4:30

| Venezuela | 1–1 | Ecuador |
|---|---|---|
| Arango 5' | Report | Castillo 23' |

Estadio José Antonio Anzoátegui, Puerto La Cruz
Attendance: 35,076
Referee: Néstor Pitana (Argentina)

16 October 2012
19:00 UTC−3

| Paraguay | 1–0 | Peru |
|---|---|---|
| Aguilar 52' | Report |

Estadio Defensores del Chaco, Asunción
Attendance: 40,114
Referee: Pablo Lunati (Argentina)

16 October 2012
21:05 UTC−3

| Chile | 1–2 | Argentina |
|---|---|---|
| F. Gutiérrez 90+1' | Report | Messi 28'; Higuaín 31' |

Estadio Nacional, Santiago
Attendance: 45,000
Referee: Antonio Arias (Paraguay)

=== Matchday 11 ===
22 March 2013
15:00 UTC−5

| Colombia | 5–0 | Bolivia |
|---|---|---|
| Torres 20'; Valdés 49'; T. Gutiérrez 62'; Falcao 86'; Armero 90+2' | Report |

Estadio Metropolitano Roberto Meléndez, Barranquilla
Attendance: 40,478
Referee: Carlos Vera (Ecuador)

22 March 2013
19:00 UTC−3

| Uruguay | 1–1 | Paraguay |
|---|---|---|
| Suárez 81' | Report | É. Benítez 85' |

Estadio Centenario, Montevideo
Attendance: 32,000
Referee: Wilmar Roldán (Colombia)

22 March 2013
21:00 UTC−3

| Argentina | 3–0 | Venezuela |
|---|---|---|
| Higuaín 29', 59'; Messi 45' (pen.) | Report |

Estadio Monumental Antonio Vespucio Liberti, Buenos Aires
Attendance: 40,000
Referee: Víctor Hugo Carrillo (Peru)

22 March 2013
21:10 UTC−5

| Peru | 1–0 | Chile |
|---|---|---|
| Farfán 87' | Report |

Estadio Nacional, Lima
Attendance: 60,081
Referee: Diego Abal (Argentina)

=== Matchday 12 ===
26 March 2013
16:00 UTC−4

| Bolivia | 1–1 | Argentina |
|---|---|---|
| Moreno 25' | Report | Banega 44' |

Estadio Hernando Siles, La Paz
Attendance: 35,000
Referee: Enrique Osses (Chile)

26 March 2013
16:00 UTC−5

| Ecuador | 4–1 | Paraguay |
|---|---|---|
| Caicedo 37'; Montero 49', 74'; C. Benítez 54' | Report | Caballero 15' |

Estadio Olímpico Atahualpa, Quito
Attendance: 33,048
Referee: Sandro Ricci (Brazil)

26 March 2013
20:30 UTC−3

| Chile | 2–0 | Uruguay |
|---|---|---|
| Paredes 10'; Vargas 77' | Report |

Estadio Nacional, Santiago
Attendance: 43,816
Referee: Néstor Pitana (Argentina)

26 March 2013
19:30 UTC−4:30

| Venezuela | 1–0 | Colombia |
|---|---|---|
| Rondón 14' | Report |

Estadio Polideportivo Cachamay, Ciudad Guayana
Attendance: 41,250
Referee: Antonio Arias (Paraguay)

=== Matchday 13 ===
7 June 2013
16:00 UTC−4

| Bolivia | 1–1 | Venezuela |
|---|---|---|
| J. Campos 86' | Report | Arango 58' |

Estadio Hernando Siles, La Paz
Attendance: 10,155
Referee: Patricio Loustau (Argentina)

7 June 2013
19:05 UTC−3

| Argentina | 0–0 | Colombia |
|---|---|---|
| | Report |

Estadio Monumental Antonio Vespucio Liberti, Buenos Aires
Attendance: 44,807
Referee: Marlon Escalante (Venezuela)

7 June 2013
20:10 UTC−4

| Paraguay | 1–2 | Chile |
|---|---|---|
| Santa Cruz 87' | Report | Vargas 41'; Vidal 56' |

Estadio Defensores del Chaco, Asunción
Attendance: 30,000
Referee: Leandro Vuaden (Brazil)

7 June 2013
21:10 UTC−5

| Peru | 1–0 | Ecuador |
|---|---|---|
| Pizarro 11' | Report |

Estadio Nacional, Lima
Attendance: 47,000
Referee: Marcelo Henrique (Brazil)

=== Matchday 14 ===
11 June 2013
15:30 UTC−5

| Colombia | 2–0 | Peru |
|---|---|---|
| Falcao 12' (pen.); T. Gutiérrez 45' | Report |

Estadio Metropolitano Roberto Meléndez, Barranquilla
Attendance: 42,265
Referee: Sandro Ricci (Brazil)

11 June 2013
16:00 UTC−5

| Ecuador | 1–1 | Argentina |
|---|---|---|
| Castillo 17' | Report | Agüero 4' (pen.) |

Estadio Olímpico Atahualpa, Quito
Attendance: 35,000
Referee: Enrique Cáceres (Paraguay)

11 June 2013
19:30 UTC−4:30

| Venezuela | 0–1 | Uruguay |
|---|---|---|
| | Report | Cavani 27' |

Estadio Polideportivo Cachamay, Ciudad Guayana
Attendance: 36,297
Referee: Paulo Oliveira (Brazil)

11 June 2013
20:30 UTC−4

| Chile | 3–1 | Bolivia |
|---|---|---|
| Vargas 16'; Sánchez 17'; Vidal 90+2' | Report | Moreno 32' |

Estadio Nacional, Santiago
Attendance: 45,000
Referee: Darío Ubriaco (Uruguay)

=== Matchday 15 ===
6 September 2013
17:00 UTC−5 (Note: Colombia v Ecuador was originally to be kicked off at 15:30 local time, but was delayed by an hour and a half due to rain.)

| Colombia | 1–0 | Ecuador |
|---|---|---|
| J. Rodríguez 30' | Report |

Estadio Metropolitano Roberto Meléndez, Barranquilla
Attendance: 46,000
Referee: Héber Lopes (Brazil)

6 September 2013
18:30 UTC−4

| Paraguay | 4–0 | Bolivia |
|---|---|---|
| Fabbro 16'; Santa Cruz 47'; Ortiz 80'; Gómez 83' | Report |

Estadio Defensores del Chaco, Asunción
Attendance: 20,000
Referee: Víctor Hugo Carrillo (Peru)

6 September 2013
20:30 UTC−4

| Chile | 3–0 | Venezuela |
|---|---|---|
| Vargas 10'; M. González 29'; Vidal 85' | Report |

Estadio Nacional, Santiago
Attendance: 46,500
Referee: Sandro Ricci (Brazil)

6 September 2013
21:30 UTC−5

| Peru | 1–2 | Uruguay |
|---|---|---|
| Farfán 84' | Report | Suárez 43' (pen.), 67' |

Estadio Nacional, Lima
Attendance: 49,222
Referee: Patricio Loustau (Argentina)

=== Matchday 16 ===
10 September 2013
16:00 UTC−4

| Bolivia | 1–1 | Ecuador |
|---|---|---|
| Arrascaita 47' | Report | Caicedo 57' (pen.) |

Estadio Hernando Siles, La Paz
Attendance: 12,043
Referee: Paulo Oliveira (Brazil)

10 September 2013
19:00 UTC−3

| Uruguay | 2–0 | Colombia |
|---|---|---|
| Cavani 77'; Stuani 80' | Report |

Estadio Centenario, Montevideo
Attendance: 51,000
Referee: Antonio Arias (Paraguay)

10 September 2013
19:25 UTC−4:30

| Venezuela | 3–2 | Peru |
|---|---|---|
| Rondón 36'; C. González 59' (pen.); Otero 76' | Report | Hurtado 19'; Zambrano 86' |

Estadio José Antonio Anzoátegui, Puerto La Cruz
Attendance: 40,049
Referee: Néstor Pitana (Argentina)

10 September 2013
21:40 UTC−4

| Paraguay | 2–5 | Argentina |
|---|---|---|
| Núñez 18'; Santa Cruz 85' | Report | Messi 12' (pen.), 52' (pen.); Agüero 32'; Di María 49'; M. Rodríguez 90' |

Estadio Defensores del Chaco, Asunción
Attendance: 27,000
Referee: Enrique Osses (Chile)

=== Matchday 17 ===
11 October 2013
16:00 UTC−5

| Colombia | 3–3 | Chile |
|---|---|---|
| T. Gutiérrez 69'; Falcao 74' (pen.), 83' (pen.) | Report | Vidal 18' (pen.); Sánchez 21', 29' |

Estadio Metropolitano Roberto Meléndez, Barranquilla
Attendance: 40,388
Referee: Paulo Oliveira (Brazil)

11 October 2013
16:00 UTC−5

| Ecuador | 1–0 | Uruguay |
|---|---|---|
| Montero 30' | Report |

Estadio Olímpico Atahualpa, Quito
Attendance: 32,996
Referee: Sandro Ricci (Brazil)

11 October 2013
16:30 UTC−4:30

| Venezuela | 1–1 | Paraguay |
|---|---|---|
| Seijas 82' | Report | É. Benítez 28' |

Estadio Polideportivo de Pueblo Nuevo, San Cristóbal
Attendance: 27,277
Referee: Víctor Hugo Carrillo (Peru)

11 October 2013
20:00 UTC−3

| Argentina | 3–1 | Peru |
|---|---|---|
| Lavezzi 23', 34'; Palacio 47' | Report | Pizarro 20' |

Estadio Monumental Antonio Vespucio Liberti, Buenos Aires
Attendance: 48,977
Referee: Carlos Vera (Ecuador)

=== Matchday 18 ===
15 October 2013
20:30 UTC−3

| Paraguay | 1–2 | Colombia |
|---|---|---|
| J. L. Rojas 7' | Report | Yepes 38', 56' |

Estadio Defensores del Chaco, Asunción
Attendance: 7,142
Referee: Diego Abal (Argentina)

15 October 2013
20:30 UTC−3

| Chile | 2–1 | Ecuador |
|---|---|---|
| Sánchez 35'; Medel 38' | Report | Caicedo 66' |

Estadio Nacional, Santiago
Attendance: 47,458
Referee: Leandro Vuaden (Brazil)

15 October 2013
21:30 UTC−2

| Uruguay | 3–2 | Argentina |
|---|---|---|
| C. Rodríguez 6'; Suárez 34' (pen.); Cavani 49' | Report | M. Rodríguez 14', 41' |

Estadio Centenario, Montevideo
Attendance: 55,000
Referee: Marcelo Henrique (Brazil)

15 October 2013
21:15 UTC−5

| Peru | 1–1 | Bolivia |
|---|---|---|
| Yotún 18' | Report | Bejarano 45' |

Estadio Nacional, Lima
Attendance: 0 (Note: Peru v Bolivia was played without spectators due to sanctions imposed by FIFA as a result of crowd disturbance incidents. The Peruvian Football Federation decided to withdraw their appeal and accepted the punishment.)
Referee: Enrique Cáceres (Paraguay)

== Inter-confederation play-offs ==
While the top four teams in CONMEBOL qualification tournament qualify for the 2014 World Cup finals in Brazil, the fifth-placed team, Uruguay, played against the fifth-placed team from the Asian Football Confederation (AFC), Jordan, in a home-and-away play-off. The winner of this play-off, Uruguay, qualified for the 2014 FIFA World Cup finals.

The first leg was played on 13 November 2013 in Jordan, and the second leg was played on 20 November 2013.

| Team 1 | Agg. | Team 2 | 1st leg | 2nd leg |
|---|---|---|---|---|
| Jordan | 0–5 | Uruguay | 0–5 | 0–0 |

== Qualified teams ==
The following six teams from CONMEBOL qualified for the final tournament.

| Team | Qualified as | Qualified on | Previous appearances in FIFA World Cup^{1} |
|---|---|---|---|
| Brazil | Hosts | 30 October 2007 | 19 (all) (1930, 1934, 1938, 1950, 1954, **1958**, **1962**, 1966, **1970**, 1974, 1978, 1982, 1986, 1990, **1994**, 1998, **2002**, 2006, 2010) |
| Argentina | Winners | 10 September 2013 | 15 (1930, 1934, 1958, 1962, 1966, 1974, **1978**, 1982, **1986**, 1990, 1994, 1998, 2002, 2006, 2010) |
| Colombia | Runners-up | 15 October 2013 | 4 (1962, 1990, 1994, 1998) |
| Chile | Third place | 15 October 2013 | 8 (1930, 1950, 1962, 1966, 1974, 1982, 1998, 2010) |
| Ecuador | Fourth place | 11 October 2013 | 2 (2002, 2006) |
| Uruguay | AFC v CONMEBOL play-off winners | 20 November 2013 | 11 (**1930**, **1950**, 1954, 1962, 1966, 1970, 1974, 1986, 1990, 2002, 2010) |

^{1} Bold indicates champions for that year. Italic indicates hosts for that year.

== Goalscorers ==
There were 201 goals scored in 72 matches, for an average of 2.79 goals per match.

11 goals

- (Uruguay) Luis Suárez

10 goals

- (Argentina) Lionel Messi

9 goals

- (Argentina) Gonzalo Higuaín
- (Colombia) Radamel Falcao

7 goals

- (Ecuador) Felipe Caicedo

6 goals

- (Colombia) Teófilo Gutiérrez

5 goals

- (Argentina) Sergio Agüero
- (Chile) Eduardo Vargas
- (Chile) Arturo Vidal
- (Peru) Jefferson Farfán
- (Uruguay) Edinson Cavani
- (Venezuela) Salomón Rondón

4 goals

- (Bolivia) Marcelo Moreno
- (Chile) Alexis Sánchez
- (Ecuador) Christian Benítez

3 goals

- (Argentina) Ángel Di María
- (Argentina) Ezequiel Lavezzi
- (Argentina) Maxi Rodríguez
- (Bolivia) Carlos Saucedo
- (Chile) Matías Fernández
- (Colombia) James Rodríguez
- (Ecuador) Segundo Castillo
- (Ecuador) Jefferson Montero
- (Paraguay) Roque Santa Cruz
- (Peru) Paolo Guerrero
- (Peru) Claudio Pizarro
- (Venezuela) Juan Arango

2 goals

- (Bolivia) Pablo Daniel Escobar
- (Chile) Charles Aránguiz
- (Chile) Gary Medel
- (Colombia) Dorlan Pabón
- (Colombia) Mario Yepes
- (Paraguay) Édgar Benítez
- (Paraguay) Jonathan Fabbro
- (Paraguay) Richard Ortiz
- (Paraguay) Cristian Riveros
- (Peru) Carlos Zambrano
- (Uruguay) Diego Forlán
- (Uruguay) Diego Lugano
- (Uruguay) Cristian Rodríguez

1 goal

- (Argentina) Éver Banega
- (Argentina) Rodrigo Palacio
- (Bolivia) Jaime Arrascaita
- (Bolivia) Diego Bejarano
- (Bolivia) Jhasmani Campos
- (Bolivia) Rudy Cardozo
- (Bolivia) Alejandro Chumacero
- (Bolivia) Wálter Flores
- (Bolivia) Gualberto Mojica
- (Bolivia) Alcides Peña
- (Chile) Matías Campos
- (Chile) Pablo Contreras
- (Chile) Marcos González
- (Chile) Felipe Gutiérrez
- (Chile) Esteban Paredes
- (Chile) Waldo Ponce
- (Chile) Humberto Suazo
- (Colombia) Pablo Armero
- (Colombia) Fredy Guarín
- (Colombia) Macnelly Torres
- (Colombia) Carlos Valdés
- (Colombia) Juan Camilo Zúñiga
- (Ecuador) Jaime Ayoví
- (Ecuador) Édison Méndez
- (Ecuador) Joao Rojas
- (Paraguay) Pablo César Aguilar
- (Paraguay) Luis Nery Caballero
- (Paraguay) Gustavo Gómez
- (Paraguay) José Ariel Núñez
- (Paraguay) Jorge Rojas
- (Paraguay) Darío Verón
- (Peru) Paolo Hurtado
- (Peru) Juan Carlos Mariño
- (Peru) Yoshimar Yotún
- (Uruguay) Sebastián Eguren
- (Uruguay) Maxi Pereira
- (Uruguay) Cristhian Stuani
- (Venezuela) Fernando Amorebieta
- (Venezuela) Frank Feltscher
- (Venezuela) César González
- (Venezuela) Rómulo Otero
- (Venezuela) Luis Manuel Seijas
- (Venezuela) Oswaldo Vizcarrondo

1 own goal

- (Ecuador) Juan Carlos Paredes (against Chile)
- (Uruguay) Diego Godín (against Peru)
