= C.D. Mineros Potosí =

Bolivian football club

Mineros Potosí
- Full name: Club Deportivo Mineros Potosí
- Founded: 2023; 3 years ago
- Ground: Estadio Potosí
- Capacity: 6,000
- President: Gilberto Fuertes
- Manager: Francisco Argüello
- League: Copa Simón Bolívar
- 2025: Primera A AFP, 3rd
Home colours	Away colours

Club Deportivo Mineros Potosí, known as Mineros Potosí or just Mineros, is a Bolivian professional football club from Potosí. The club was founded in 2023, and competes in Copa Simón Bolívar, holding home matches at the Estadio Potosí, with a capacity of 6,000 people.

== History ==
Founded in 2023 as a project of the mining community in the city of Potosí, Mineros was established by the Fuertes Catata family, and started a football side in the following year, winning the Primera B tournament of the Potosí Football Association. The club qualified to the Copa Simón Bolívar for the first time in 2025, after finishing third in the Primera A.

In their first appearance in the Copa Simón Bolívar, Mineros finished first of their group in both Regional and National stages, and reached the finals of the competition against IN San Juan.

== Managers ==
- (Paraguay) Francisco Argüello (2026–)
