= Estadio Sierra Nevada =

Football stadium in Colombia

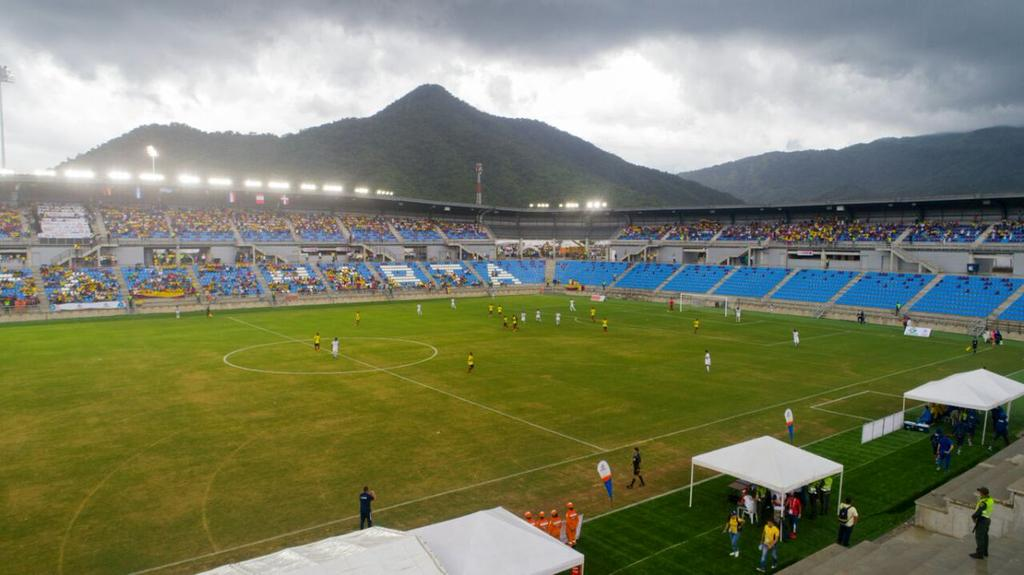
- Interactive map of Estadio Sierra Nevada
- Location: Santa Marta, Colombia
- Coordinates: 11.1908847°N 74.19924611111111°W
- Owner: Municipality of Santa Marta
- Operator: Unión Magdalena
- Capacity: 16,162
- Surface: Grass
- Field size: 110 by 70 yards (101 by 64 m)

Construction
- Built: 2016-2020
- Opened: 11 November 2017
- Cost: COP 52.449 million
- Architect: Mazzanti
- Project manager: Harold Sierra
- General contractors: La Macuira Inversiones & Construcciones SA, McDaniel Ltda & Grupo Constructor E.O.O. SAS.

Tenants
- Unión Magdalena (2018–present)

Estadio Sierra Nevada (Spanish: Estadio Sierra Nevada [esˈtaðjo ˈsjera neˈβaða]) (also known as Estadio Unidad Bolivariana Bureche) is a football stadium in the city of Santa Marta, Colombia. The stadium was opened on 11 November 2017. It was the host stadium for the football matches at the 2017 Bolivarian Games and home stadium for local football club Unión Magdalena starting from 2018. The stadium is designed with a capacity of 16,162 people.

Due to delays, the stadium could not be completed by the start of the Bolivarian Games.

== History ==
=== Construction ===
The decision to build the new stadium for the city of Santa Marta was made by mayor Rafael Martínez after Colombia won the bid to host the 2017 Bolivarian Games, which is organized by ODEBO. Considering it was better to build a multipurpose scenario rather than remodeling the Eduardo Santos Stadium, since the order to permanently close the Eduardo Santos was due to it presenting precarious safety conditions for those attending.

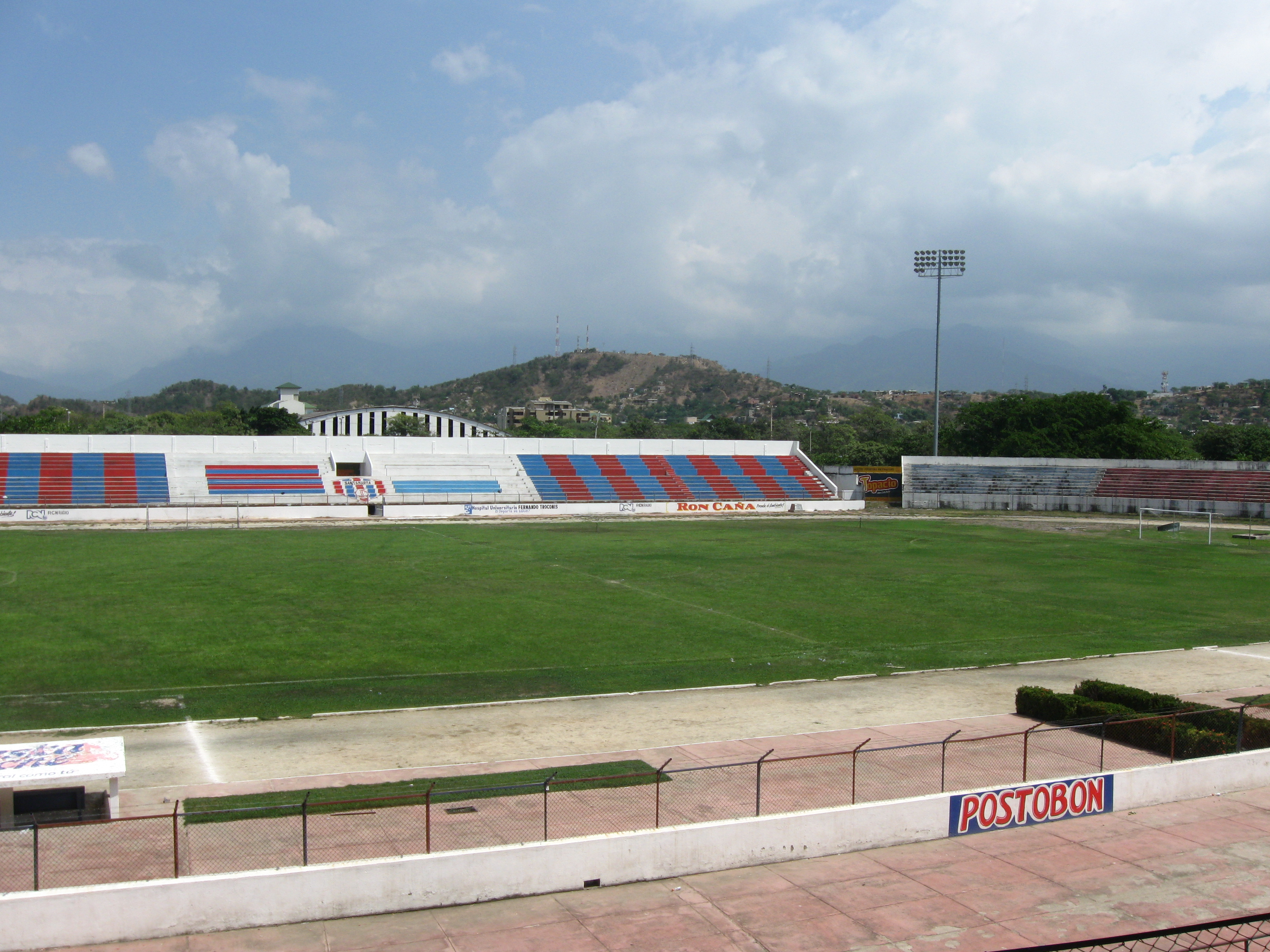
The old Eduardo Santos Stadium, the city's first and former stadium

The construction of the stadium started in November 2016 with seating capacity for 16,000 spectators and is the axis of the new Villa Bolivariana for the 2017 Bolivarian Games. It was the venue for the opening and closing ceremonies of the Games as well as the men's U-17 and the women's U-20 soccer tournaments, although the western tribune of the stadium was incomplete at the time of the event. the new stadium is owned by the local the municipality of Santa Marta.

The stadium is located in the sector of Bureche in the south of the city, within a lot of 34 hectares (340,000 m^{2}).

The stadium has been delayed during the construction multiple time for different reasons, it was scheduled to be completed between 2017 and 2018. It caused criticism from the football club fans and media.

== New Stadium ==
The opening ceremony of the Bolivarian games took place at the stadium on November 11 2017. The act was attended by the mayor of the city of Santa Marta, Rafael Martínez, the outgoing president of ODEBO, Danilo Carrera, and the director of Coldeportes, Clara Luz Roldán González. The two-hour ceremony was closed with a flourish by Carlos Vives.

The new stadium replaced Eduardo Santos Stadium as Unión's home starting from the 2018 Categoría Primera B season, the football club was able to return home after 1591 days without playing in this city.

On 25 February 2018, Unión Magdalena played its first match at the Estadio Sierra Nevada, beating Atlético F.C. by a 2–1 score in the third matchday of the Primera B season.

On 26 February 2019, one year later. Unión played its first Categoría Primera A match, lost to Jaguares de Córdoba by a 3–4 score, hat-trick scored by Ricardo Márquez.

== Name ==
In October 2017, the mayor of the city, Rafael Martínez, in a press conference announced the name of the stadium "Sierra Nevada", which is Santa Marta's isolated mountain range. According to the mayor, the reasons of the name: "We consider that we have to highlight our natural, cultural wealth, of the Kogis, a value, hope, life, love...Values, so that they can be an example for the next generations to follow".

== Location ==
The stadium is located in the sector of Bureche, in the south of the city. The stadium can be accessed by car and public transportation.

== See also ==
- List of football stadiums in Colombia
- Lists of stadiums
