= Luis René Barboza =

Bolivian footballer (born 1993)

Luis René Barbosa
Personal information
- Full name: Luis René Barbosa Quiróz
- Date of birth: 2 April 1993 (age 33)
- Place of birth: Santa Cruz de la Sierra, Bolivia
- Height: 1.75 m (5 ft 9 in)
- Position: Centre-back

Team information
- Current team: San Antonio Bulo Bulo
- Number: 3

Youth career
- –2012: Blooming

Senior career*
Years	Team	Apps	(Gls)
2012–2013	Blooming	19	(8)
2014–2017	Guabirá	45	(1)
2018–2025	Aurora	185	(4)
2025–	San Antonio Bulo Bulo	10	(3)

International career^{‡}
2020	Bolivia U20	1	(0)
2024	Bolivia U23	4	(0)
2023–	Bolivia	1	(0)
- * Club domestic league appearances and goals as of 5 July 2025 ‡ National team caps and goals as of 27 August 2023

Luis René Barbosa Quiróz (born 2 April 1993) is a Bolivian footballer who plays for Aurora of the Primera División in Bolivia.

== Career ==
Born in Santa Cruz, Barbosa began playing football as a defender with the youth teams of Blooming. He joined Blooming's senior side in January 2012.

== Career statistics ==
=== International ===
As of match played 27 August 2023

Appearances and goals by national team and year
National team	Year	Apps	Goals
Bolivia	2023	1	0
Total		1	0
