= Robson Matheus =

Bolivian association football player (born 2002)

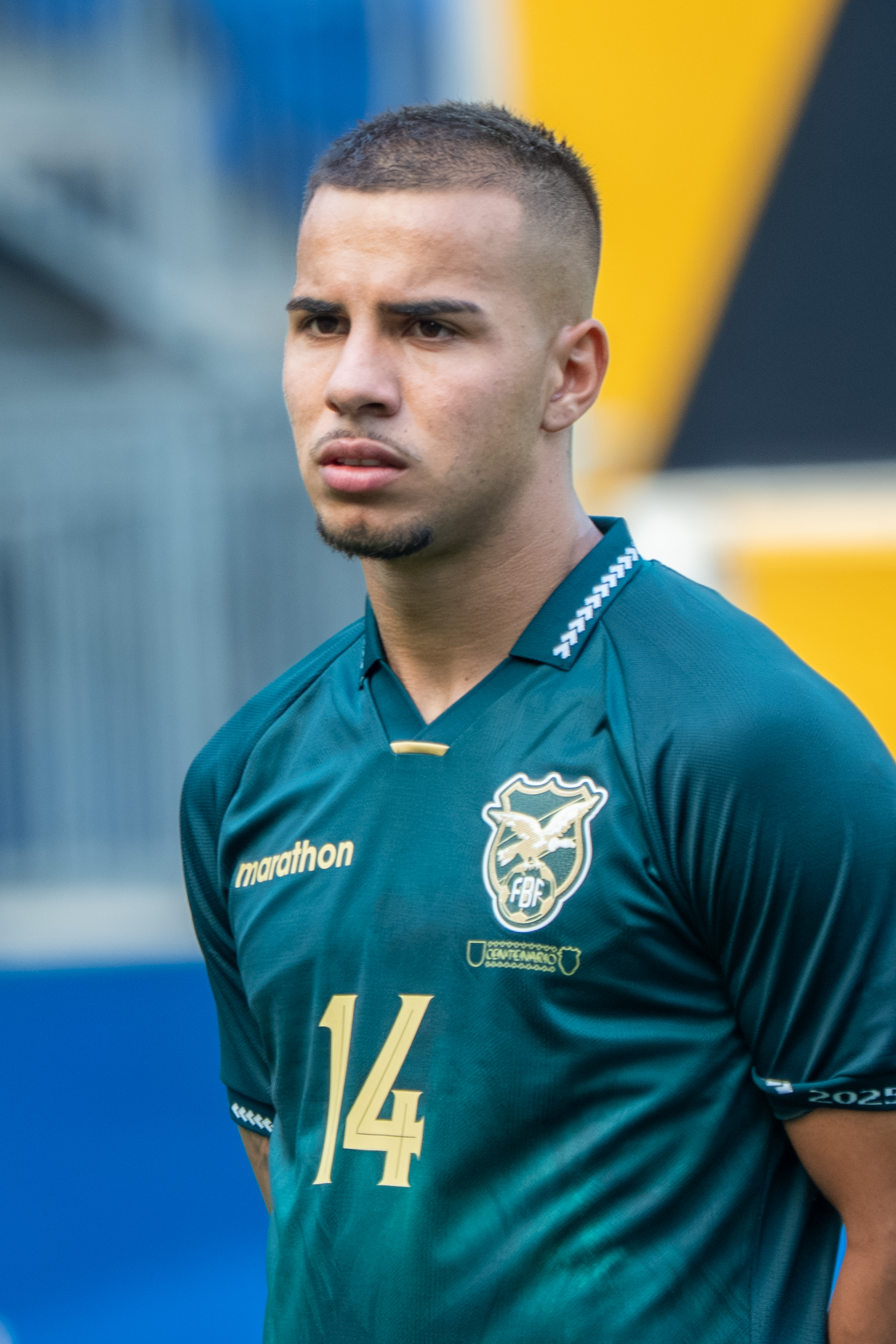
- Robson Matheus with Bolivia in 2026

Personal information
- Full name: Robson Matheus Tomé de Araújo Benegas
- Date of birth: 18 May 2002 (age 24)
- Place of birth: Santa Cruz de la Sierra, Bolivia
- Height: 1.74 m (5 ft 9 in)
- Position: Midfielder

Team information
- Current team: Bolívar
- Number: 14

Youth career
- 2013–2016: Corinthians
- 2016–2017: Portuguesa
- 2017–2021: Palmeiras
- 2021–2022: Cruzeiro
- 2022: Ibrachina

Senior career*
Years	Team	Apps	(Gls)
2023–2025	Always Ready	36	(11)
2025–	Bolívar	32	(4)

International career^{‡}
2019	Bolivia U17	4	(1)
2024–	Bolivia	25	(1)
- * Club domestic league appearances and goals as of 17 September 2026 ‡ National team caps and goals as of 23:02, 30 September 2026 (UTC)

Robson Matheus Tomé de Araújo Benegas (born 18 May 2002), known as Robson Matheus, is a Bolivian footballer who plays as a midfielder for Bolívar and the Bolivia national football team.

== Early and personal life ==
Born in Santa Cruz de la Sierra to a Bolivian mother and Brazilian father, Robson moved to Brazil at the age of ten, and started playing for Corinthians. In 2018, after a short period at Portuguesa, he moved to Palmeiras.

In June 2021, Robson Matheus (also nicknamed Bolívia at the time) signed for Cruzeiro and was assigned to the under-20 team. In August 2022, after being released by the latter side, he agreed to a deal with Ibrachina.

== Club career ==
In December 2022, Robson Matheus signed for Club Always Ready. He spent the entire 2023 season without featuring for the main squad, before making the pre-season with the club for the 2024 season.

Robson Matheus made his senior league debut for Always Ready on 17 February 2024, against Universitario de Vinto. In April 2024, he reported a rejected spot-fixing offer he refused to deliberately earn a booking during a Copa Sudamericana tie against Defensa y Justicia. He said that an initial offer of US$ 5,000 was doubled to US$10,000 after he initially refused; the call came from a Paraguayan number.

Robson Matheus scored his first senior goal on 18 September 2024, netting his team's second in a 3–3 away draw against San Antonio Bulo Bulo. In the following three months, he would score a further ten goals, finishing the year as the club's top scorer.

== International career ==
In 2019, Robson Matheus was called up to the Bolivia national under-17 team whilst he was in the youth academy at Palmeiras. He received his first call-up to the full side in March 2024, for two friendlies against Algeria and Andorra.

Robson Matheus made his full international debut on 25 March 2024, starting in a 1–0 win over Andorra. In June, he was included in Antônio Carlos Zago's preliminary 29-man squad for the 2024 Copa América, being also included in the final list. However, he failed to make a single appearance in the competition.

== Career statistics ==
=== Club ===
As of 17 September 2026.

Club	Season	League			Cup		Continental		Total	
Club	Season	Division	Apps	Goals	Apps	Goals	Apps	Goals	Apps	Goals
Always Ready	2023	Primera División	0	0	—		0	0	0	0
Always Ready	2024	Primera División	36	11	—		12 (Note: Four appearances and one goal in Copa Libertadores, eight appearances in Copa Sudamericana)	1	48	12
Always Ready	2025	Primera División	15	1	0	0	11 (Note: Five appearances in Copa Libertadores, six appearances and two goals in Copa Sudamericana)	2	26	2
Bolivar	2025	Primera División	19	1	13	3	11 (Note: Five appearances in Copa Libertadores, six appearances and two goals in Copa Sudamericana)	2	43	6
Bolivar	2026	Primera División	13	3	3	6	10 (Note: Six appearances and two goals in Copa Lbertadores, four appearances and one goal in Copa Sudamericana)	3	13	10
Career total			70	13	36	9	43	8	150	30

=== International ===
As of 30 September 2026

National team	Year	Apps	Goals
Bolivia	2024	5	0
Bolivia	2025	11	1
Bolivia	2026	9	0
Total		25	1

Scores and results list Bolivia's goal tally first, score column indicates score after each Matheus goal.

List of international goals scored by Robson Matheus
No.	Date	Venue	Opponent	Score	Result	Competition
1	10 October 2025	Recep Tayyip Erdoğan Stadium, Istanbul, Turkey	Jordan	1–0	1–0	Friendly
