= Paolo Alcocer =

Footballer (born 2000)

Personal information
- Full name: Paolo Andrés Alcocer Coca
- Date of birth: 3 September 2000 (age 26)
- Place of birth: Ansbach, Germany
- Height: 1.83 m (6 ft 0 in)
- Positions: Midfielder; defender

Team information
- Current team: Wilstermann

Youth career
- 2014–2015: Charleston Battery
- 2016–2017: Orlando City
- 2018: Charlotte FC
- 2018–2019: Weston FC

Senior career*
Years	Team	Apps	(Gls)
2019–2021	Club Bolívar	9	(0)
2021–2022	Club Aurora	27	(0)
2023	Club Atlético Palmaflor	23	(0)
2024	Universitario de Vinto	20	(0)
2025–	Wilstermann	0	(0)

International career^{‡}
2015	Bolivia U15	6	(1)
2017	Bolivia U17	13	(1)
2019	Bolivia U20	4	(0)
- * Club domestic league appearances and goals as of 22:23, 10 May 2021 (UTC) ‡ National team caps and goals as of 22:23, 17 June 2019 (UTC)

Paolo Andrés Alcocer Coca (born 3 September 2000) is a professional footballer who plays as a midfielder and defender for Universitario de Vinto. Born in Germany, Alcocer is also eligible to represent the United States and Bolivia, the latter of which he has been capped at youth international level for.

== Personal life ==
Born in Ansbach, Germany. Alcocer grew up in Savannah, Ga and started playing with South Georgia Tormenta FC Academy. In 2015 Alcocer joined Orlando City SC. Alcocer spent the 2017–19 academy season alternating between Charlotte Football Club under-18 and Weston FC under-19. Between 2017 and 2020, Alcocer was called in to Bolivia under 17 and under 20 side several times.

In 2019 at the age of 18, signed a Professional contract with Club Bolivar of La Paz-Bolivia. Alcocer made his professional debut the same year as a Professional player in a match between Club Bolivar and Club Aurora. He attended Windsor Forest High School in Savannah Ga and graduated from the virtual program in 2019. In 2021 at the height of the Bolivian first division season, suffered an injury setting him aside for the rest of the season.

In December 2022, Alcocer signed with Club Palmaflor for the 2023 Bolivian First Division and Copa Sudamericana.

His grandfather, Máximo Alcócer, played for the Bolivia national team.

== International career ==
Alcocer has represented Bolivia at the under-15, under-17, and under-20 level.

== Career statistics ==
=== Club ===
As of 12 Dec 2023

Appearances and goals by club, season and competition
Division	Apps	Goals	Apps	Goals	Apps	Goals	Apps	Goals	Apps	Goals		
Club Bolivar	2019	Bolivian Primera División	1	0	0	0	0	0	0	0	1	0
Club Bolivar	2020	Bolivian Primera División	8	0	0	0	0	0	0	0	8	0
Club Aurora	2021	Bolivian Primera División	12	0	0	0	0	0	0	0	12	0
Club Aurora	2022	Bolivian Primera División	15	0	0	0	0	0	0	0	15	0
Club Atlético Palmaflor	2023	Bolivian Primera División	23	0	0	0	0	0	0	0	23	0
