= Daniel Cataño =

Colombian footballer (born 1991)

Personal information
- Full name: Daniel Felipe Cataño Torres
- Date of birth: 17 January 1992 (age 34)
- Place of birth: Bello, Colombia
- Height: 1.74 m (5 ft 9 in)
- Position: Defensive midfielder

Team information
- Current team: DIM
- Number: 10

Senior career*
Years	Team	Apps	(Gls)
2008–2014	Deportivo Rionegro	146	(20)
2009	→ Envigado (loan)	0	(0)
2015–2016	Atlético Bucaramanga	67	(12)
2017	Deportivo Pasto	17	(1)
2017–2018	DIM	27	(2)
2018–2022	Deportes Tolima	75	(6)
2022–2025	Millonarios F.C.	98	(11)
2025	Bolívar	31	(7)
2026–	Independiente Medellín	2	(0)

International career^{‡}
2009	Colombia U17	3	(0)
2023	Colombia	1	(0)
- * Club domestic league appearances and goals as of 15 May 2026 ‡ National team caps and goals as of 16 December 2023

Daniel Felipe Cataño Torres (born 1 July 1992) is a Colombian footballer who plays for Independiente Medellín.

== Career ==
=== Deportivo Rionegro ===
Cataño made his professional debut with Deportivo Rionegro (now Itagüí Leones) during the 2008 season, finishing as runner-up in Categoría Primera B and scoring a goal in the final against Real Cartagena. His strong performance earned him a spot representing the Colombia national under-17 team at the World Cup in Nigeria. He was subsequently loaned to Envigado FC for the first half of 2009; upon returning to his parent club for the 2009 *Torneo Finalización*, he played two matches and scored one goal.

=== Bolívar ===
On July 3, 2025, he was announced as a new player for Club Bolívar in Bolivia. During his first half-season with "La Academia," he contributed 7 goals and 10 assists in 31 matches, finishing as runner-up in both the Bolivian Primera División and 2025 Copa Bolivia.

== International career ==
Cataño made his debut for the senior Colombia national team on 16 December 2023 in a friendly against Mexico.

== Personal life ==
On February 12, 2023, while playing for Millonarios, Cataño was assaulted by a Deportes Tolima fan seconds before the match began, an incident that caused the game to be suspended and sparked a nationwide controversy. Cataño retaliated against the fan's assault and was sent off by referee Wílmar Roldán. The players and coaching staff of the *Embajador* team chose to withdraw from the match, stating that "guarantees [of safety] were lacking." Subsequently, the player was reported to the authorities by his assailant.

== Honours ==
Atlético Bucaramanga

- Categoría Primera B: 2015

Deportes Tolima

- Categoría Primera A: 2021-I
- Superliga Colombiana: 2022

Millonarios

- Categoría Primera A: 2023-I
- Copa Colombia: 2022
- Superliga Colombiana: 2024
