= Héctor Sánchez (footballer, born 1997) =

Bolivian association football player (b. 1997)

Ronaldo Sánchez
Personal information
- Full name: Héctor Ronaldo Sánchez Camaras
- Date of birth: 24 April 1997 (age 29)
- Place of birth: Santa Cruz de la Sierra, Bolivia
- Height: 1.75 m (5 ft 9 in)
- Position: Midfielder

Team information
- Current team: Club Deportivo Guabirá
- Number: 10

Senior career*
| Years | Team | Apps | (Gls) |
| 2015–2016 | Ciclón | 5 | (0) |
| 2016–2019 | Oriente Petrolero | 59 | (6) |
| 2019 | The Strongest | 6 | (0) |
| 2020–2024 | Oriente Petrolero | 75 | (8) |
| 2024 | GV San José | 37 | (7) |
| 2025- | Club Deportivo Guabirá | 26 | (3) |

International career^{‡}
| 2020– | Bolivia U23 | 4 | (0) |
| 2018– | Bolivia | 5 | (0) |
- * Club domestic league appearances and goals as of 08:27 (UTC) 26 May 2026 ‡ National team caps and goals as of 21:29, 17 September 2022 (UTC)

Héctor Ronaldo Sánchez Camaras (commonly known as Ronaldo Sánchez (born 24 April 1997) is a Bolivian international footballer who plays as a midfielder for Bolivian club Club Deportivo Guabirá.

== Career ==
He made his professional debut for Club Atlético Ciclón on September 26, 2016, in a two-goal draw against Nacional Potosí. After transferring to Oriente Petrolero he made his debut for his new club on 20 May 2017 against The Strongest. On September 14 of that year he scored his first goal in a 1–1 draw against Bolívar in La Paz. During the 2019 season Sanchez signed for The Strongest. He was suspended by the club for indiscipline following a late return to the club from a visit back to his home in Santa Cruz. In January 2020 he returned to his previous club Oriente Petrolero.

== International career ==
On 27 March 2018, Sanchez debuted for the senior Bolivia national football team, starting an international friendly against Curaçao. In September 2020, Sanchez along with club teammates Ferddy Roca and Mateo Zoch left the national team squad by order of their club Oriente Petrolero president Ronald Raldes.
