= Jaime Arrascaita =

Bolivian footballer (born 1993)

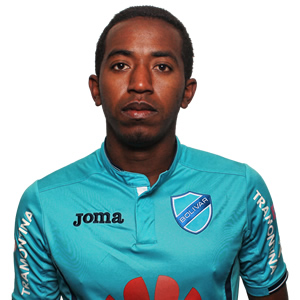
- Arrascaita with Bolívar in 2016

Personal information
- Full name: Jaime Darío Arrascaita Iriondo
- Date of birth: 2 September 1993 (age 33)
- Place of birth: La Paz, Bolivia
- Height: 1.75 m (5 ft 9 in)
- Position: Attacking midfielder

Team information
- Current team: The Strongest
- Number: 30

Youth career
- 2010–2013: Criciúma

Senior career*
Years	Team	Apps	(Gls)
2013–2018	Bolívar	96	(13)
2017	→ Sport Boys (loan)	18	(2)
2019	Real Potosí	37	(8)
2020	Wilstermann	22	(5)
2021–	The Strongest	139	(25)

International career^{‡}
2013–	Bolivia	17	(1)
- * Club domestic league appearances and goals as of 30 December 2025 ‡ National team caps and goals as of 16:21, 26 March 2024 (UTC)

Jaime Darío Arrascaita Iriondo (born 2 September 1993) is a Bolivian professional footballer who plays as an attacking midfielder for The Strongest.

== Club career ==
Arrascaita was recruited in 2010 by Bolívar to be part of their lower divisions. In 2011 passed the reservations team of the club, the Professional Bolívar, with which participates in several regional, national and international championships as the Dallas Cup 2011 and 2012. At the beginning of the 2013-2014 season is promoted to the first team the club with which he first division debut in 2013 with 19 years, under the technical leadership of Miguel Ángel Portugal.

== International career ==
He played for Bolivia national football team at the 2014 FIFA World Cup qualification.

=== International goals ===
#	Date	Venue	Opponent	Score	Result	Competition
1.	2013-09-10	Estadio Hernando Siles, La Paz, Bolivia	Ecuador	1–0	1–1	2014 FIFA World Cup qualification

== Honours ==
Bolívar

- Primera División: 2011 Adecuación, 2013 Clausura, 2014 Apertura, 2015 Clausura, 2017 Apertura, 2017 Clausura, 2019 Apertura

The Strongest

- Primera División: 2023
