= Yadir Meneses =

Colombian footballer (born 2000)

Personal information
- Full name: Yadir Meneses Betancur
- Date of birth: 1 April 2000 (age 26)
- Place of birth: Bello, Colombia
- Height: 1.76 m (5 ft 9 in)
- Position: Midfielder

Team information
- Current team: Llaneros
- Number: 70

Youth career
- Envigado

Senior career*
Years	Team	Apps	(Gls)
2018–2022	Envigado	28	(2)
2023–	Llaneros	6	(1)

International career
2017	Colombia U17	4	(0)
- * Club domestic league appearances and goals as of 19:12, 9 April 2023 (UTC)

Yadir Meneses Betancur (born 1 April 2000) is a Colombian footballer who currently plays as a midfielder for Llaneros.

== Career statistics ==
=== Club ===
As of 15 December 2019.

Club	Season	League			Cup		Continental		Other		Total	
Club	Season	Division	Apps	Goals	Apps	Goals	Apps	Goals	Apps	Goals	Apps	Goals
Envigado	2018	Categoría Primera A	1	0	1 (Note: Appearances in the Copa Colombia)	0	0	0	0	0	2	0
Envigado	2019	Categoría Primera A	2	0	5	0	0	0	0	0	7	0
Career total			3	0	6	0	0	0	0	0	9	0
