= Gilbert Álvarez =

Bolivian footballer (born 1992)

Personal information
- Full name: Gilbert Álvarez Vargas
- Date of birth: 7 April 1992 (age 34)
- Place of birth: Santa Cruz, Bolivia
- Height: 1.85 m (6 ft 1 in)
- Position: Forward

Team information
- Current team: Independiente Petrolero
- Number: 91

Youth career
- 2005–2008: Club Calleja

Senior career*
Years	Team	Apps	(Gls)
2008	Club Calleja	0	(0)
2008–2011	Cruzeiro	0	(0)
2011	The Strongest	6	(0)
2012–2013	Guabirá	0	(0)
2014–2016	Real Potosí	62	(27)
2016–2018	Jorge Wilstermann	78	(34)
2018	Al-Hazem	9	(0)
2019–2021	Jorge Wilstermann	61	(28)
2022	Royal Pari	37	(10)
2023	Palmaflor del Trópico	20	(8)
2023–2024	Arema	7	(2)
2024	Oriente Petrolero	31	(16)
2025	Once Caldas	15	(1)
2025–2026	Oriente Petrolero	20	(7)
2026–	Independiente Petrolero	11	(2)

International career^{‡}
2009	Bolivia U17	7	(3)
2009–	Bolivia	31	(5)
- * Club domestic league appearances and goals as of 30 December 2025 ‡ National team caps and goals as of 28 June 2021

Gilbert Álvarez Vargas (born 7 April 1992) is a Bolivian professional footballer who plays as a forward for División Profesional club Independiente Petrolero.

== Club career ==
Álvarez played for several youth teams in his home city of Santa Cruz in Bolivia, including Club Destroyers and Club Calleja.

In August 2010, Álvarez was signed by Cruzeiro of Brazil. He did not play a first team game for Cruzeiro prior to the 2011 Copa America, and he was not named in Bolivia's squad for the tournament.

In August 2011, Álvarez announced that he was considering a move to Europe, citing that talks between his agent and one club in Germany and another in Italy were underway.

On 25 November 2023, Álvarez joined Indonesia club Arema. However, on 7 March 2024, Álvarez would leave the club early, cited that he wants to be closer with his family as the reason.

== International career ==
During his time with Callejas, he was called up by the Bolivia U17 to play as their lone striker in the 2009 South American U-17 Championship. He scored three goals in the tournament, including a double against Ecuador under-17s in the final group stage.

Later in 2009, as a 17-year-old, Álvarez was called up to the senior Bolivia side. He made his first senior international appearance as a substitute against Venezuela in a qualifying match for the 2010 FIFA World Cup on 6 June 2009. He gained a second cap the following year in a 5–0 friendly match defeat to Mexico in February 2010.

=== International goals ===
Scores and results list Bolivia's goal tally first.

No	Date	Venue	Opponent	Score	Result	Competition
1.	2 June 2017	Nicaragua National Football Stadium, Managua, Nicaragua	Nicaragua	1–0	1–0	Friendly
2.	7 June 2017	Estadio Provincial de Yacuíba, Yacuíba, Bolivia	Nicaragua	2–2	3–2	Friendly
3.	31 August 2017	Estadio Monumental "U", Lima, Peru	Peru	1–2	1–2	2018 FIFA World Cup qualification
4.	10 October 2019	Estadio Olímpico, Caracas, Venezuela	Venezuela	1–3	1–4	Friendly
5.	15 October 2019	Estadio Ramón Tahuichi Aguilera, Santa Cruz de la Sierra, Bolivia	Haiti	3–1	3–1	Friendly

== Personal life ==
Álvarez comes from a large family, being the fifth of thirteen children. He harbours aspirations to play in Europe, declaring in a 2009 interview that he was delighted by reported interest in his signature from Lazio and that his ultimate ambition was to play for Manchester United. He is the brother of soccer players William and Sebastián Álvarez.
