= Estadio Juan Carlos Durán =

Stadium in Bolivia

Coordinates: 17°48′19″S 63°09′57″W

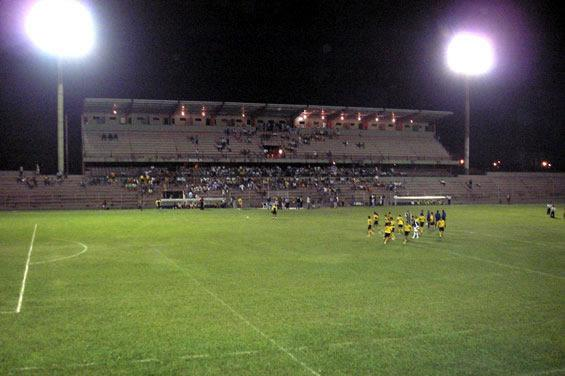
- Interactive map of Estadio Juan Carlos Durán
- Full name: Estadio Juan Carlos Durán Saucedo
- Location: Santa Cruz de la Sierra, Bolivia
- Capacity: 25,000

Construction
- Opened: 1997

Tenant
- Real Santa Cruz

Estadio Juan Carlos Durán is a multi-use stadium in Santa Cruz de la Sierra, Bolivia. It is currently used mostly for football matches, on club level by Real Santa Cruz. The stadium has a capacity of 25,000 spectators.
