= Jorge Rojas (Bolivian footballer) =

Bolivian footballer (born 1993)

Personal information
- Full name: Jorge Hugo Rojas Justiniano
- Date of birth: 6 December 1993 (age 32)
- Place of birth: Santa Cruz de la Sierra, Bolivia
- Height: 1.70 m (5 ft 7 in)
- Position: Midfielder

Team information
- Current team: Nacional Potosi
- Number: 11

Senior career*
Years	Team	Apps	(Gls)
2014–2015	Universitario de Pando	8	(1)
2016–2019	Sport Boys Warnes	84	(12)
2020	Always Ready	16	(2)
2021	Club Blooming	21	(2)
2022–2024	Oriente Petrolero	53	(4)
2023	Palmaflor (loan)	9	(1)
2024–	Nacional Potosi	53	(8)

International career^{‡}
2018	Bolivia	1	(0)
- * Club domestic league appearances and goals as of 09:02, 28 December 2025 (UTC) ‡ National team caps and goals as of 31 March 2019

Jorge Hugo Rojas Justiniano (born 6 December 1993) is a Bolivian professional footballer who plays as a midfielder for Nacional Potosi.

== International career ==
In September 2018 Rojas was called up to the Bolivia national football team. Rojas made his debut for Bolivia in a 2-2 friendly tie with Nicaragua on 3 March 2019.
