= Ferddy Roca =

Bolivian footballer (born 2000)

Personal information
- Full name: Ferddy Andrés Roca Vivancos
- Date of birth: 24 March 2000 (age 26)
- Place of birth: Santa Cruz de la Sierra, Bolivia
- Height: 1.70 m (5 ft 7 in)
- Position: Forward

Team information
- Current team: Marbella (on loan from Oriente Petrolero)
- Number: 2

Youth career
- Oriente Petrolero

Senior career*
Years	Team	Apps	(Gls)
2017–	Oriente Petrolero	33	(4)
2020–	→ Marbella (loan)	4	(0)

International career
2017	Bolivia U17	4	(2)
- * Club domestic league appearances and goals as of 21 March 2021

Ferddy Roca (born 24 March 2000) is a Bolivian football player who plays as forward for Marbella on loan from Oriente Petrolero.

In September 2020, Sanchez along with club teammates Hector Sanchez and Mateo Zoch left the national team squad by order of their club Oriente Petrolero president Ronald Raldes.
