= John García (footballer) =

Bolivian footballer (born 2000)

Personal information
- Full name: Jhon Elian García Sossa
- Date of birth: 13 April 2000 (age 26)
- Place of birth: Santa Cruz de la Sierra, Bolivia
- Height: 1.70 m (5 ft 7 in)
- Position: Midfielder

Team information
- Current team: The Strongest
- Number: 20

Youth career
- 2013–2017: Calleja

Senior career*
Years	Team	Apps	(Gls)
2017–2023	Huachipato	5	(0)
2018	→ La Serena (loan)	7	(0)
2019	→ Oriente Petrolero (loan)	41	(3)
2021	→ Club Bolívar (loan)	20	(2)
2022	→ Royal Pari (loan)	36	(9)
2023	The Strongest	14	(0)
2024	Oriente Petrolero	24	(8)
2025–	The Strongest	30	(11)

International career^{‡}
2017	Bolivia U17	4	(0)
2018–	Bolivia	7	(0)
- * Club domestic league appearances and goals as of 30 December 2025 ‡ National team caps and goals as of 22:00, 14 November 2025 (UTC)

John Elian García Sossa (born 13 April 2000), also known as John “Wave” García, is a Bolivian professional footballer who plays as a midfielder for The Strongest.

== Professional career ==
On 24 May 2017, García Sossa signed with Huachipato in Chile from his local club Calleja.

On 31 March 2018, García made his debut with the senior team in Primera División in a 2–0 home win against Everton, coming on as a 63rd-minute substitute for Joaquín Verdugo. | Debutó en Copa Libertadores de América 2021 con Club Bolívar en Uruguay|

== International career ==
García Sossa made his international debut for the Bolivia national football team in a 1–1 friendly tie with Curaçao on 23 March 2018. |Club Bolívar | Copa Libertadores de América 2021|Club Bolívar |Copa Tigo 2021 Liga Boliviana |

== Career statistics ==
=== International ===
As of matches played 14 November 2025

Appearances and goals by national team and year
National team	Year	Apps	Goals
Bolivia	2018	2	0
Bolivia	2019	1	0
Bolivia	2021	1	0
Bolivia	2022	2	0
Bolivia	2025	1	0
Total		7	0
