= Club Aurora =

Bolivian football club

- Full name: Club Deportivo Aurora
- Nickname: El equipo del pueblo (People's team)
- Founded: 27 May 1935; 91 years ago
- Ground: Estadio Félix Capriles; Cochabamba, Bolivia
- Capacity: 32,000
- Chairman: Jaime Cornejo
- Manager: Sergio Zeballos & Edward Zenteno (caretakers)
- League: División Profesional
- 2025: División Profesional, 10th of 16
- Website: cdaurora.com.bo
Home colours	Away colours	Third colours

Club Deportivo Aurora is a football club from Cochabamba, Bolivia, that plays in the División de Fútbol Profesional, the top tier of Bolivian football. The club was founded 27 May 1935, and plays its home games at the Estadio Félix Capriles.

== Honours ==
=== National ===
- Bolivian Primera División
  - Winners (2): 1963, 2008-C
- Bolivian Second Division
  - Winners (2): 2002, 2016–17

=== Regional ===
- Primera "A" (AFC)
  - Winners (16): 1950, 1954, 1961, 1963, 1964, 1994, 1995, 1996, 1997, 1998, 1999, 2000, 2001, 2002, 2014–15, 2016–17

== Performance in CONMEBOL competitions ==
- Copa Libertadores: 3 appearances

1964 - Group stage
2009 - Group stage
2024 - 2nd stage

- Copa Sudamericana: 5 appearances

2004 - Preliminary round
2011 - Round of 16
2012 - 2nd round
2015 - 1st round
2025 - First stage

== Current squad ==
As of 14 March 2026

Note: Flags indicate national team as defined under FIFA eligibility rules; some limited exceptions apply. Players may hold more than one non-FIFA nationality.

No.	Pos.	Nation	Player
1	GK	BOL	Joel Terrazas
2	DF	BOL	Miguel Aguada
3	DF	BOL	Luis Barboza
4	DF	BOL	Iván Vidaurre
5	MF	PAR	Alfredo Amarilla
7	FW	COL	Jefferson Ramos
8	MF	BOL	Leonardo Viviani
9	FW	PAR	José Verdún
10	FW	BOL	Rodrigo Ramallo
11	FW	URU	Denis Olivera
12	GK	BOL	Rubén Cordano
14	DF	URU	Pablo López
15	DF	BOL	José Córdova
16	DF	ARG	Leandro Barro

No.	Pos.	Nation	Player
17	MF	BOL	Jaime Cornejo
18	FW	BOL	Sergio Ferreira
19	MF	BOL	Erwin Sánchez
20	FW	COL	John Deiby Araujo
21	DF	BOL	Miyhel Ortiz
22	DF	BOL	Ray Peña
26	MF	BOL	David Villca
27	MF	BOL	Ariel Flores
30	MF	BOL	Marcelo Gonzales
33	DF	BOL	Enrique Troncoso
69	FW	ARG	Alan Terrazas
81	MF	BOL	Santiago Carrasco
99	GK	BOL	Matias Barba

== Managers ==
- (Bolivia) Mario Ortega
- (Bolivia) Julio César Baldivieso (1 July 2008 – 24 July 2009), (2 April 2011 – 2 Nov 2011)
- (Argentina) Jorge Habegger (5 Jan 2012 – 13 Feb 2012)
- (Bolivia) Julio César Baldivieso (20 June 2012 – 31 Dec 2012)
- (Bolivia) Victor Hugo Antelo (14 March 2013 – Sept 30, 2013)
- (Argentina) Miguel Ángel Zahzú (7 Jan 2014 – 7 July 2014)
- (Bolivia) David Torrico (1 Aug 2014 – 11 Oct 2014)
- (Argentina) Luis Manuel Blanco (13 Oct 2014 – 30 June 2015)
- (Bolivia) Marcelo Claros (1 July 2015 – 2 September 2015)
- (Paraguay) Roberto Pérez Valdez (1 July 2016 – 30 June 2017)
- (Argentina) Miguel Ángel Zahzú (1 January 2018 – 16 April 2018)
- (Bolivia) Marcos Ferrufino (8 August 2018 – 8 April 2019)
- (Brazil) Thiago Leitão (8 April 2019 – 1 June 2019)
- (Uruguay) Julio Fuentes (8 June 2019 – 9 September 2019)
- (Bolivia) Julio César Baldivieso (1 January 2020 – 16 December 2020)
- (Bolivia) Humberto Viviani (1 January 2021 – 18 October 2021)
- (Bolivia) Sergio Zeballos (18 October 2021 – 1 February 2022)
- (Paraguay) Francisco Argüello (1 February 2022 – 13 September 2022)
- (Paraguay) Roberto Pérez Valdez (15 October 2022 – 31 October 2023)
- (Bolivia) Mauricio Soria (15 November 2023 -)

== Reserve team ==
Aurora has a reserve team named Club Deportivo Pasión Celeste, founded on 2 February 2015. The club first reached the Copa Simón Bolívar in 2023.
