= F.C. Universitario de Vinto =

Bolivian football club

Universitario de Vinto
- Full name: Fútbol Club Universitario de Vinto
- Nicknames: La U de Vinto; Manzanero
- Founded: 23 March 2005; 21 years ago
- Ground: Estadio Hipólito Lazarte; Vinto, Bolivia
- Capacity: 2,000
- Chairman: Fernando Chávez
- Manager: Adrián Barral (caretaker)
- League: División Profesional
- 2025: División Profesional, 14th of 16
Home colours	Away colours

Fútbol Club Universitario de Vinto, known as Universitario de Vinto, is a Bolivian football club based in Vinto. Founded in 2005, it plays in the Bolivian División Profesional after being promoted for the 2022 season by winning the Copa Simón Bolívar the previous campaign.

== History ==
Initially founded as a university team in the early 2000s, the club was officially founded as a professional side on 23 March 2005, the day it was affiliated to the Asociación Municipal de Fútbol Vinto. They first played in the Copa Simón Bolívar in 2017, being knocked out in the group stage.

Universitario de Vinto reached the second stage of the Simón Bolívar in 2018, but did not appear in the 2019 and 2020 campaigns after failing to qualify. They returned to the national second division in 2021, and won the title after defeating Universitario de Sucre in the Final.

== Current squad ==
As of 24 March, 2026

Note: Flags indicate national team as defined under FIFA eligibility rules; some limited exceptions apply. Players may hold more than one non-FIFA nationality.

No.	Pos.	Nation	Player
1	GK	BOL	Bruno Poveda
4	DF	DOM	Brian López
5	MF	BOL	Paolo Alcocer
6	MF	BOL	Marco Gomez
7	MF	URU	Hugo Dorrego
8	MF	BOL	Daniel Camacho
9	FW	COL	Rodrigo Llano
10	FW	BOL	Jair Torrico
11	MF	BOL	Juan Cuellar
12	GK	BOL	Jesús Careaga
13	MF	BOL	Sergio Pardo
14	FW	BOL	José Veizaga
17	MF	BOL	Didí Torrico
21	MF	BOL	Guilder Cuellar

No.	Pos.	Nation	Player
22	MF	BOL	Joel Calicho
23	MF	ARG	Ezequiel Straccia
24	MF	BOL	Hernán Rodríguez
25	MF	BOL	José Abrego
27	DF	BOL	Brayan Calderón
28	DF	BOL	José Pinto
34	DF	ARG	Agustin Jara
45	MF	BOL	Yeferson Mamani
47	MF	BOL	Diego Callaú
66	DF	BOL	Alvaro Cuestas
70	DF	BOL	Julio Lazarte
90	FW	BOL	Diego Saavedra

== Honours ==
- Copa Simón Bolívar
  - Winners (1): 2021

== Performance in CONMEBOL competitions ==
- Copa Sudamericana: 2 appearances

Best: First stage in 2024 and 2025.
