= Venezuela national football team results (2020–present) =

This article provides details of international football games played by the Venezuela national football team from 2020 to present.

== Results ==
Key
Win
Draw
Defeat

=== 2020 ===
9 October 2020 2022 World Cup qualification	Colombia	3–0	Venezuela	Barranquilla, Colombia
18:30 UTC−5	Zapata 16'; Muriel 26', 45+3'	Report		Stadium: Estadio Metropolitano Roberto Meléndez; Attendance: 0 Referee: Guillermo Guerrero (Ecuador)

13 October 2020 2022 World Cup qualification	Venezuela	0–1	Paraguay	Mérida, Venezuela
18:00 UTC−4		Report	Giménez 85'	Stadium: Estadio Metropolitano de Mérida; Attendance: 0 Referee: Andrés Rojas (Colombia)

13 November 2020 2022 World Cup qualification	Brazil	1–0	Venezuela	São Paulo, Brazil
21:30 UTC−3	Firmino 66'	Report		Stadium: Estádio do Morumbi; Attendance: 0 Referee: Juan Gabriel Benítez (Paraguay)

17 November 2020 2022 World Cup qualification	Venezuela	2–1	Chile	Caracas, Venezuela
17:00 UTC−4	Mago 9'; Rondón 81'	Report	Vidal 15'	Stadium: Estadio Olímpico de la UCV; Attendance: 0 Referee: Patricio Loustau (Argentina)

=== 2021 ===
3 June 2021 2022 World Cup qualification	Bolivia	3–1	Venezuela	La Paz, Bolivia
16:00 UTC−4	Moreno 5', 83'; Bejarano 60'	Report	Chancellor 26'	Stadium: Estadio Hernando Siles; Attendance: 0 Referee: Jhon Ospina (Colombia)

8 June 2021 2022 World Cup qualification	Venezuela	0–0	Uruguay	Caracas, Venezuela
18:30 UTC−4		Report		Stadium: Estadio Olímpico de la UCV; Attendance: 0 Referee: Anderson Daronco (Brazil)

13 June 2021 2021 Copa América GS	Brazil	3–0	Venezuela	Brasília, Brazil
18:00 UTC−3	Marquinhos 23'; Neymar 64' (pen.); Gabriel 89'	Report		Stadium: Estádio Nacional Mané Garrincha; Attendance: 0 Referee: Esteban Ostojich (Uruguay)

17 June 2021 2021 Copa América GS	Colombia	0–0	Venezuela	Goiânia, Brazil
18:00 UTC−3		Report		Stadium: Estádio Olímpico Pedro Ludovico; Attendance: 0 Referee: Eber Aquino (Paraguay)

20 June 2021 2021 Copa América GS	Venezuela	2–2	Ecuador	Rio de Janeiro, Brazil
18:00 UTC−3	Castillo 51'; Hernández 90+1'	Report	Ay. Preciado 39'; Plata 71'	Stadium: Estádio Olímpico Nilton Santos; Attendance: 0 Referee: Roberto Tobar (Chile)

27 June 2021 2021 Copa América GS	Venezuela	0–1	Peru	Brasília, Brazil
18:00 UTC−3		Report	Carrillo 48'	Stadium: Estádio Nacional Mané Garrincha; Attendance: 0 Referee: Patricio Loustau (Argentina)

2 September 2021 2022 World Cup qualification	Venezuela	1–3	Argentina	Caracas, Venezuela
20:00 UTC−4	Soteldo 90+4' (pen.)	Report	La. Martínez 45+2'; J. Correa 71'; Á. Correa 74'	Stadium: Estadio Olímpico de la UCV; Referee: Leodán González (Uruguay)

5 September 2021 2022 World Cup qualification	Peru	1–0	Venezuela	Lima, Peru
20:00 UTC−5	Cueva 35'	Report		Stadium: Estadio Nacional; Attendance: 8,000; Referee: Luis Quiroz (Ecuador)

9 September 2021 2022 World Cup qualification	Paraguay	2–1	Venezuela	Asunción, Paraguay
18:30 UTC−4	D. Martínez 7'; Gamarra 46'	Report	Chancellor 90'	Stadium: Estadio Defensores del Chaco; Attendance: 5,000; Referee: Roberto Tobar (Chile)

7 October 2021 2022 World Cup qualification	Venezuela	1–3	Brazil	Caracas, Venezuela
19:30 UTC−4	Ramírez 11'	Report	Marquinhos 71'; Gabriel Barbosa 85' (pen.); Antony 90+5'	Stadium: Estadio Olímpico de la UCV; Attendance: 6,000; Referee: Kevin Ortega (Peru)

10 October 2021 2022 World Cup qualification	Venezuela	2–1	Ecuador	Caracas, Venezuela
16:30 UTC−4	Machís 45+1'; Bello 64'	Report	Valencia 37' (pen.)	Stadium: Estadio Olímpico de la UCV; Attendance: 10,000; Referee: Andrés Cunha (Uruguay)

14 October 2021 2022 World Cup qualification	Chile	3–0	Venezuela	Santiago, Chile
21:00 UTC−3	Pulgar 18', 37'; Brereton 73'	Report		Stadium: Estadio San Carlos de Apoquindo; Attendance: 10,000; Referee: Raphael Claus (Brazil)

11 November 2021 2022 World Cup qualification	Ecuador	1–0	Venezuela	Quito, Ecuador
16:00 UTC−5	Hincapié 41'	Report		Stadium: Estadio Rodrigo Paz Delgado; Attendance: 25,000; Referee: Christian Ferreyra (Uruguay)

16 November 2021 2022 World Cup qualification	Venezuela	1–2	Peru	Caracas, Venezuela
19:00 UTC−4	Machís 52'	Report	Lapadula 18'; Cueva 65'	Stadium: Estadio Olímpico de la UCV; Attendance: 9,000; Referee: Bruno Arleu (Brazil)

=== 2022 ===
28 January 2022 2022 World Cup qualification	Venezuela	4–1	Bolivia	Barinas, Venezuela
18:00 UTC−4	Rondón 24', 34', 67'; Machís 55'	Report	Miranda 38'	Stadium: Estadio Agustín Tovar; Attendance: 24,000; Referee: Guillermo Guerrero (Ecuador)

1 February 2022 2022 World Cup qualification	Uruguay	4–1	Venezuela	Montevideo, Uruguay
20:00 UTC−3	Bentancur 1'; De Arrascaeta 23'; Cavani 45'; L. Suárez 53' (pen.)	Report	Jf. Martínez 65'	Stadium: Estadio Centenario; Attendance: 55,000; Referee: Bruno Arleu (Brazil)

25 March 2022 2022 World Cup qualification	Argentina	3–0	Venezuela	Buenos Aires, Argentina
20:30 UTC−3	González 34'; Di María 79'; Messi 82'	Report		Stadium: Monumental de Nuñez; Attendance: 42,000; Referee: Kevin Ortega (Peru)

29 March 2022 2022 World Cup qualification	Venezuela	0–1	Colombia	Ciudad Guayana, Venezuela
19:30 UTC−4		Report	Rodríguez 45+4' (pen.)	Stadium: Polideportivo Cachamay; Attendance: 41,600; Referee: Wilton Sampaio (Brazil)

1 June 2022 Friendly	Malta	0–1	Venezuela	Ta' Qali, Malta
19:00 UTC+2		Report	Rondón 34'	Stadium: National Stadium; Referee: Kristo Tohver (Estonia)

9 June 2022 Friendly	Saudi Arabia	0–1	Venezuela	Murcia, Spain
19:00 UTC+2		Report	Ferraresi 37'	Stadium: Estadio Enrique Roca; Referee: Daniel Gómez Gordillo (Gibraltar)

22 September 2022 Friendly	Venezuela	0–1	Iceland	Mödling, Austria
18:00 UTC+2		Report	Jóhannesson 87' (pen.)	Stadium: Motion invest Arena; Referee: Sebastian Gishamer (Austria)

27 September 2022 Friendly	United Arab Emirates	0–4	Venezuela	Wiener Neustadt, Austria
17:00 UTC+2		Report	Savarino 18'; Rondón 25'; Chancellor 34'; Martínez 77'	Stadium: Stadion Wiener Neustadt; Attendance: 350; Referee: Manuel Schüttengruber (Austria)

15 November 2022 Friendly	Panama	2–2	Venezuela	Al Hamriyah, United Arab Emirates
21:00 UTC+4	Fajardo 26'; Yanis 79'	Report	Rondón 83' (pen.); Torregrossa 90+3'	Stadium: Al Hamriya Sports Club Stadium; Referee: Sultan Mohamed (United Arab Emirates)

20 November 2022 Friendly	Syria	1–2	Venezuela	Dubai, United Arab Emirates
21:00 UTC+4	Rihianieh 49'	Report	Torregrossa 2'; Rondón 50'	Stadium: Rashid Stadium; Referee: Omar Al Ali (United Arab Emirates)

=== 2023 ===
24 March 2023 Friendly	Saudi Arabia	1–2	Venezuela	Jeddah, Saudi Arabia
22:00 UTC+3	Al-Dawsari 73'	Report	Martínez 26'; Rondón 34'	Stadium: Prince Abdullah Al Faisal Stadium; Attendance: 4,960; Referee: Ahmed Al-Kaf (Oman)

28 March 2023 Friendly	Uzbekistan	1–1	Venezuela	Jeddah, Saudi Arabia
21:00 UTC+3	Yakhshiboev 78' (pen.)	Report	González 6'	Stadium: King Abdullah Sport City Stadium; Attendance: 30; Referee: Khaled Saleh Al-Turais (Saudi Arabia)

15 June 2023 Friendly	Venezuela	1–0	Honduras	Washington, D.C., United States
20:00 UTC−4	Soteldo 37'	Report		Stadium: Audi Field; Referee: Jaime Alfredo Herrera (El Salvador)

18 June 2023 Friendly	Venezuela	1–0	Guatemala	East Hartford, United States
16:30 UTC−4	Herrera 80'	Report		Stadium: Pratt & Whitney Stadium at Rentschler Field; Referee: Jeremy Scheer (United States)

7 September 2023 2026 World Cup qualification	Colombia	1–0	Venezuela	Barranquilla, Colombia
18:00 UTC−5	Borré 46'	Report		Stadium: Estadio Metropolitano Roberto Meléndez; Attendance: 43,084; Referee: Anderson Daronco (Brazil)

12 September 2023 2026 World Cup qualification	Venezuela	1–0	Paraguay	Maturín, Venezuela
18:00 UTC−4	Rondón 90+3' (pen.)	Report		Stadium: Estadio Monumental; Attendance: 34,187; Referee: Andrés Rojas (Colombia)

12 October 2023 2026 World Cup qualification	Brazil	1–1	Venezuela	Cuiabá, Brazil
19:30 UTC−4	Gabriel 50'	Report	Bello 85'	Stadium: Arena Pantanal; Attendance: 39,018; Referee: Kevin Ortega (Peru)

17 October 2023 2026 World Cup qualification	Venezuela	3–0	Chile	Maturín, Venezuela
17:00 UTC−4	Soteldo 45+1'; Rondón 72'; Machís 79'	Report		Stadium: Estadio Monumental; Attendance: 50,932; Referee: Flávio Rodrigues de Souza (Brazil)

16 November 2023 2026 World Cup qualification	Venezuela	0–0	Ecuador	Maturín, Venezuela
18:00 UTC−4		Report		Stadium: Estadio Monumental; Attendance: 51,083; Referee: Juan Gabriel Benítez (Paraguay)

21 November 2023 2026 World Cup qualification	Peru	1–1	Venezuela	Lima, Peru
21:00 UTC−5	Yotún 17'	Report	Savarino 54'	Stadium: Estadio Nacional; Attendance: 27,323; Referee: Darío Herrera (Argentina)

=== 2024 ===
21 March 2024 Friendly	Venezuela	1–2	Italy	Fort Lauderdale, United States
17:00 UTC−4	Machís 43'	Report	Retegui 40', 80'	Stadium: Chase Stadium; Referee: Rubiel Vazquez (United States)

24 March 2024 Friendly	Guatemala	0–0	Venezuela	Houston, United States
17:00 UTC−5		Report		Stadium: Shell Energy Stadium; Referee: Armando Villarreal (United States)

22 June 2024 2024 Copa América GS	Ecuador	1–2	Venezuela	Santa Clara, United States
15:00 UTC−7	Sarmiento 40'	Report	Cádiz 64'; Bello 74'	Stadium: Levi's Stadium; Attendance: 29,864; Referee: Wilmar Roldán (Colombia)

26 June 2024 2024 Copa América GS	Venezuela	1–0	Mexico	Inglewood, United States
18:00 UTC−7	Rondón 57' (pen.)	Report		Stadium: SoFi Stadium; Attendance: 72,773; Referee: Raphael Claus (Brazil)

30 June 2024 2024 Copa América GS	Jamaica	0–3	Venezuela	Austin, United States
19:00 UTC−5		Report	Bello 49'; Rondón 56'; Ramírez 85'	Stadium: Q2 Stadium; Attendance: 20,240; Referee: Maurizio Mariani (Italy)

5 July 2024 2024 Copa América QF	Venezuela	1–1 (3–4 p)	Canada	Arlington, United States
20:00 UTC−5	Rondón 65'	Report	Shaffelburg 13'	Stadium: AT&T Stadium; Attendance: 51,080; Referee: Wilton Sampaio (Brazil)
	Penalties
	Rondón (penalty scored); Herrera (penalty missed); Rincón (penalty scored); Savarino (penalty missed); Cádiz (penalty scored); Ángel (penalty missed)		(penalty scored) David; (penalty missed) Millar; (penalty scored) Bombito; (penalty missed) Eustáquio; (penalty scored) Davies; (penalty scored) Koné

5 September 2024 2026 World Cup qualification	Bolivia	4–0	Venezuela	El Alto, Bolivia
16:00 UTC−4	R. Vaca 13'; Algarañaz 45+5' (pen.); Terceros 46'; Monteiro 89'	Report		Stadium: Estadio Municipal de El Alto; Attendance: 20,500; Referee: Wilmar Roldán (Colombia)

10 September 2024 2026 World Cup qualification	Venezuela	0–0	Uruguay	Maturín, Venezuela
18:00 UTC−4		Report		Stadium: Estadio Monumental; Attendance: 50,000; Referee: Raphael Claus (Brazil)

10 October 2024 2026 World Cup qualification	Venezuela	1–1	Argentina	Maturín, Venezuela
17:00 UTC−4	Rondón 65'	Report	Otamendi 13'	Stadium: Estadio Monumental; Attendance: 50,000; Referee: Gustavo Tejera (Uruguay)

15 October 2024 2026 World Cup qualification	Paraguay	2–1	Venezuela	Asunción, Paraguay
20:00 UTC−3	Sanabria 59', 74'	Report	Aramburu 25'	Stadium: Estadio Defensores del Chaco; Attendance: 28,531; Referee: Piero Maza (Chile)

14 November 2024 2026 World Cup qualification	Venezuela	1–1	Brazil	Maturín, Venezuela
17:00 UTC−4	Segovia 46'	Report	Raphinha 43'	Stadium: Estadio Monumental; Attendance: 32,200; Referee: Andrés Rojas (Colombia)

19 November 2024 2026 World Cup qualification	Chile	4–2	Venezuela	Santiago, Chile
21:00 UTC−3	Vargas 20'; Rincón 29' (o.g.); Cepeda 38', 47'	Report	Savarino 13'; Ramírez 22'	Stadium: Estadio Nacional Julio Martínez Prádanos; Attendance: 31,906; Referee: Facundo Tello (Argentina)

=== 2025 ===
18 January 2025 Friendly	United States	3–1	Venezuela	Fort Lauderdale, United States
15:00 UTC−5	McGlynn 37'; Agyemang 39'; Miljevic 64'	Report	Yriarte 68'	Stadium: Chase Stadium; Attendance: 18,008; Referee: Steven Madrigal (Costa Rica)

21 March 2025 2026 World Cup qualification	Ecuador	2–1	Venezuela	Quito, Ecuador
16:00 UTC−5	Valencia 39', 46'	Report	Cádiz 90+1'	Stadium: Estadio Rodrigo Paz Delgado; Attendance: 41,575; Referee: Ramon Abatti (Brazil)

25 March 2025 2026 World Cup qualification	Venezuela	1–0	Peru	Maturín, Venezuela
20:00 UTC−4	Rondón 41' (pen.)	Report		Stadium: Estadio Monumental; Attendance: 33,683; Referee: Cristian Garay (Chile)

6 June 2025 2026 World Cup qualification	Venezuela	2–0	Bolivia	Maturín, Venezuela
18:00 UTC−4	Cuéllar 5' (o.g.); Rondón 30'	Report		Stadium: Estadio Monumental; Attendance: 46,741; Referee: Yael Falcón Pérez (Argentina)

10 June 2025 2026 World Cup qualification	Uruguay	2–0	Venezuela	Montevideo, Uruguay
20:00 UTC−3	Aguirre 43'; De Arrascaeta 47'	Report		Stadium: Estadio Centenario; Attendance: 29,672; Referee: Raphael Claus (Brazil)

4 September 2025 2026 World Cup qualification	Argentina	3–0	Venezuela	Buenos Aires, Argentina
20:30 UTC−3	Messi 39', 80'; La. Martínez 76'	Report		Stadium: Estadio Monumental; Referee: Piero Maza (Chile)

9 September 2025 2026 World Cup qualification	Venezuela	3–6	Colombia	Maturín, Venezuela
19:30 UTC−4	Segovia 3'; Martínez 12'; Rondón 76'	Report	Mina 10'; Suárez 42', 50', 59', 67'; Córdoba 78'	Stadium: Estadio Monumental; Referee: Maximiliano Ramírez (Argentina)

10 October 2025 Friendly	Argentina	1–0	Venezuela	Miami Gardens, United States
20:00 UTC−4	Lo Celso 31'	Report		Stadium: Hard Rock Stadium; Attendance: 20,000; Referee: Tori Penso (United States)

14 October 2025 Friendly	Venezuela	Cancelled	Belize	Bridgeview, United States
15:00 UTC−5		Report		Stadium: SeatGeek Stadium
Note: The match was cancelled due to unrest from Operation Midway Blitz.

14 November 2025 Friendly	Venezuela	1–0	Australia	Houston, United States
20:30 UTC−6	Ramírez 38'	Report		Stadium: Shell Energy Stadium; Attendance: 500; Referee: Armando Villarreal (United States)

18 November 2025 Friendly	Venezuela	0–2	Canada	Fort Lauderdale, United States
20:30 UTC−5		Report	Koné 23'; P. David 83'	Stadium: Chase Stadium; Attendance: 4,200; Referee: Rubiel Vazquez (United States)

=== 2026 ===
27 March 2026 2026 FIFA Series	Venezuela	4–1	Trinidad and Tobago	Tashkent, Uzbekistan
15:00 UTC+5	Alfonzo 60', 67'; Rondón 81', 85'	Report	Moore 52'	Stadium: Pakhtakor Stadium; Attendance: 1,000; Referee: Rustam Lutfullin (Uzbekistan)

30 March 2026 2026 FIFA Series	Uzbekistan	0–0 (5–4 p)	Venezuela	Tashkent, Uzbekistan
19:00 UTC+5		Report		Stadium: Milliy Stadium; Attendance: 29,225; Referee: Mederbek Taichiev (Kyrgyzstan)
	Penalties
	Iskanderov (penalty scored); Temirov (penalty scored); Ashurmatov (penalty scored); Shukurov (penalty scored); Mozgovoy (penalty scored)		(penalty scored) Rondón; (penalty scored) González; (penalty missed) Sosa; (penalty scored) Quintero; (penalty scored) Segovia

6 June 2026 Friendly	Venezuela	1–2	Turkey	Fort Lauderdale, United States
19:00 UTC−4	Mendoza 13'	Report	Yılmaz 44'; Akgün 54'	Stadium: Chase Stadium; Referee: Daniel Quintero (Mexico)

9 June 2026 Friendly	Venezuela	2–0	Iraq	Bridgeview, United States
20:00 UTC−5	Cásseres Jr. 17'; Ramírez 46'	Report		Stadium: SeatGeek Stadium; Referee: Filip Dujic (Canada)

28 September 2026 Kirin Challenge Cup 2026	Japan	2–1	Venezuela	Hiroshima, Japan
19:25 UTC+9	Ueda 49' (pen.), 90+6'	Report	Kelsy 46'	Stadium: Edion Peace Wing Hiroshima; Attendance: 27,882; Referee: Tim Danaskos (Australia)

2 October 2026 Friendly	South Korea	0–0	Venezuela	Ulsan, South Korea
20:00 UTC+9		Report		Stadium: Ulsan Munsu Football Stadium; Attendance: 35,911; Referee: Alireza Faghani (Iran)

6 October 2026 Friendly	Jordan	0–0	Venezuela	Amman, Jordan
20:00 UTC+3		Report		Stadium: King Abdullah II Stadium; Referee: Mohanad Qasim Sarray (Iraq)

14 November 2026 Friendly	Basque Country	1–0	Venezuela	Bilbao, Spain
20:00 UTC+1	Jauregizar 27'	Report		Stadium: San Mamés Stadium; Attendance: 40,041; Referee: Ricardo de Burgos Bengoetxea (Basque Country)

17 November 2026 Friendly	Russia	2–0	Venezuela	Krasnodar, Russia
19:00 UTC+3	Al. Miranchuk 59', 75'	Report		Stadium: Krasnodar Stadium; Attendance: 31,701; Referee: Firdavs Norsafarov (Uzbekistan)
