= Uruguay national football team results (2020–present) =

This article provides details of international football games played by the Uruguay national football team from 2020 to present.

== Results ==
Key
Win
Draw
Defeat

=== 2020 ===
8 October 2020 2022 World Cup qualification	Uruguay	2–1	Chile	Montevideo, Uruguay
19:45 UTC−3	Suárez 39' (pen.); Gómez 90+3'	Report	Sánchez 54'	Stadium: Estadio Centenario; Attendance: 0 Referee: Éber Aquino (Paraguay)

13 October 2020 2022 World Cup qualification	Ecuador	4–2	Uruguay	Quito, Ecuador
16:00 UTC−5	Caicedo 14'; Estrada 45+3', 52'; Plata 75'	Report	Suárez 83' (pen.), 90+5' (pen.)	Stadium: Estadio Rodrigo Paz Delgado; Attendance: 0 Referee: Wilmar Roldán (Colombia)

13 November 2020 2022 World Cup qualification	Colombia	0–3	Uruguay	Barranquilla, Colombia
15:30 UTC−5		Report	Cavani 5'; Suárez 54' (pen.); Núñez 73'	Stadium: Estadio Metropolitano Roberto Meléndez; Attendance: 0 Referee: Fernando Rapallini (Argentina)

17 November 2020 2022 World Cup qualification	Uruguay	0–2	Brazil	Montevideo, Uruguay
20:00 UTC−3		Report	Arthur 33'; Richarlison 45'	Stadium: Estadio Centenario; Attendance: 0 Referee: Roberto Tobar (Chile)

=== 2021 ===
3 June 2021 2022 World Cup qualification	Uruguay	0–0	Paraguay	Montevideo, Uruguay
19:00 UTC−3		Report		Stadium: Estadio Centenario; Attendance: 0 Referee: Wilmar Roldán (Colombia)

8 June 2021 2022 World Cup qualification	Venezuela	0–0	Uruguay	Caracas, Venezuela
18:30 UTC−4		Report		Stadium: Estadio Olímpico de la UCV; Attendance: 0 Referee: Anderson Daronco (Brazil)

18 June 2021 2021 Copa América GS	Argentina	1–0	Uruguay	Brasília, Brazil
21:00 UTC−3	Rodríguez 13'	Report		Stadium: Estádio Nacional Mané Garrincha; Attendance: 0 Referee: Wilton Sampaio (Brazil)

21 June 2021 2021 Copa América GS	Uruguay	1–1	Chile	Cuiabá, Brazil
17:00 UTC−4	Suárez 66'	Report	Vargas 26'	Stadium: Arena Pantanal; Attendance: 0 Referee: Raphael Claus (Brazil)

24 June 2021 2021 Copa América GS	Bolivia	0–2	Uruguay	Cuiabá, Brazil
17:00 UTC−4		Report	Quinteros 40' (o.g.); Cavani 79'	Stadium: Arena Pantanal; Attendance: 0 Referee: Alexis Herrera (Venezuela)

28 June 2021 2021 Copa América GS	Uruguay	1–0	Paraguay	Rio de Janeiro, Brazil
21:00 UTC−3	Cavani 21' (pen.)	Report		Stadium: Estádio Olímpico Nilton Santos; Attendance: 0 Referee: Raphael Claus (Brazil)

3 July 2021 2021 Copa América QF	Uruguay	0–0 (2–4 p)	Colombia	Brasília, Brazil
19:00 UTC−3		Report		Stadium: Estádio Nacional Mané Garrincha; Attendance: 0 Referee: Jesús Gil Manzano (Spain)
	Penalties
	Cavani (penalty scored); Giménez (penalty missed); Suárez (penalty scored); Viña (penalty missed)		(penalty scored) Zapata; (penalty scored) Sánchez; (penalty scored) Mina; (penalty scored) Borja

2 September 2021 2022 World Cup qualification	Peru	1–1	Uruguay	Lima, Peru
20:00 UTC−5	Tapia 25'	Report	De Arrascaeta 29'	Stadium: Estadio Nacional; Attendance: 8,000; Referee: Néstor Pitana (Argentina)

5 September 2021 2022 World Cup qualification	Uruguay	4–2	Bolivia	Montevideo, Uruguay
19:00 UTC−3	De Arrascaeta 15', 67' (pen.); Valverde 31'; Álvarez 47'	Report	Moreno 59', 84' (pen.)	Stadium: Estadio Campeón del Siglo; Attendance: 15,000; Referee: Eber Aquino (Paraguay)

9 September 2021 2022 World Cup qualification	Uruguay	1–0	Ecuador	Montevideo, Uruguay
19:30 UTC−3	Pereiro 90+2'	Report		Stadium: Estadio Campeón del Siglo; Attendance: 15,000; Referee: Anderson Daronco (Brazil)

7 October 2021 2022 World Cup qualification	Uruguay	0–0	Colombia	Montevideo, Uruguay
20:00 UTC−3		Report		Stadium: Estadio Gran Parque Central; Attendance: 18,000; Referee: Jesús Valenzuela (Venezuela)

10 October 2021 2022 World Cup qualification	Argentina	3–0	Uruguay	Buenos Aires, Argentina
20:30 UTC−3	Messi 38'; De Paul 44'; La. Martínez 62'	Report		Stadium: Estadio Monumental Antonio Vespucio Liberti; Attendance: 35,000; Referee: Roberto Tobar (Chile)

14 October 2021 2022 World Cup qualification	Brazil	4–1	Uruguay	Manaus, Brazil
20:30 UTC−4	Neymar 10'; Raphinha 18', 58'; Gabriel Barbosa 83'	Report	Suárez 77'	Stadium: Arena da Amazônia; Referee: Fernando Rapallini (Argentina)

12 November 2021 2022 World Cup qualification	Uruguay	0–1	Argentina	Montevideo, Uruguay
20:00 UTC−3		Report	Di María 7'	Stadium: Estadio Campeón del Siglo; Referee: Alexis Herrera (Venezuela)

16 November 2021 2022 World Cup qualification	Bolivia	3–0	Uruguay	La Paz, Bolivia
16:00 UTC−4	Arce 29', 79'; Moreno 45'	Report		Stadium: Estadio Hernando Siles; Referee: Wilton Sampaio (Brazil)

=== 2022 ===
27 January 2022 2022 World Cup qualification	Paraguay	0–1	Uruguay	Asunción, Paraguay
20:00 UTC−3		Report	L. Suárez 50'	Stadium: Estadio General Pablo Rojas; Referee: Darío Herrera (Argentina)

1 February 2022 2022 World Cup qualification	Uruguay	4–1	Venezuela	Montevideo, Uruguay
20:00 UTC−3	Bentancur 1'; De Arrascaeta 23'; Cavani 45'; L. Suárez 53' (pen.)	Report	Jf. Martínez 65'	Stadium: Estadio Centenario; Referee: Bruno Arleu (Brazil)

24 March 2022 2022 World Cup qualification	Uruguay	1–0	Peru	Montevideo, Uruguay
20:30 UTC−3	De Arrascaeta 42'	Report		Stadium: Estadio Centenario; Referee: Anderson Daronco (Brazil)

29 March 2022 2022 World Cup qualification	Chile	0–2	Uruguay	Santiago, Chile
20:30 UTC−3		Report	L. Suárez 79'; Valverde 90'	Stadium: Estadio San Carlos de Apoquindo; Referee: Patricio Loustau (Argentina)

2 June 2022 Friendly	Mexico	0–3	Uruguay	Glendale, United States
19:00 UTC−7		Report	Vecino 35'; Cavani 46', 54'	Stadium: State Farm Stadium; Attendance: 57,735; Referee: Juan Calderón (Costa Rica)

5 June 2022 Friendly	United States	0–0	Uruguay	Kansas City, United States
16:00 UTC−5		Report		Stadium: Children's Mercy Park; Attendance: 19,569; Referee: Adonai Escobedo (Mexico)

11 June 2022 Friendly	Uruguay	5–0	Panama	Montevideo, Uruguay
17:00 UTC−3	Cavani 39', 48' (pen.); De la Cruz 58'; Gómez 68'; Rossi 77'	Report		Stadium: Estadio Centenario; Referee: Cristián Garay (Chile)

23 September 2022 Friendly	Iran	1–0	Uruguay	Sankt Pölten, Austria
18:00 UTC+2	Taremi 79'	Report		Stadium: NV Arena; Referee: Walter Altmann (Austria)

27 September 2022 Friendly	Canada	0–2	Uruguay	Bratislava, Slovakia
18:00 UTC+2		Report	De la Cruz 6'; Núñez 34'	Stadium: Tehelné pole Referee: Peter Kralovic (Slovakia)

24 November 2022 2022 World Cup GS	Uruguay	0–0	South Korea	Al Rayyan, Qatar
16:00 UTC+3		Report		Stadium: Education City Stadium; Attendance: 41,663; Referee: Clément Turpin (France)

28 November 2022 2022 World Cup GS	Portugal	2–0	Uruguay	Lusail, Qatar
22:00 UTC+3	Fernandes 54', 90+3' (pen.)	Report		Stadium: Lusail Iconic Stadium; Attendance: 88,668; Referee: Alireza Faghani (Iran)

2 December 2022 2022 World Cup GS	Ghana	0–2	Uruguay	Al Wakrah, Qatar
18:00 UTC+3		Report	De Arrascaeta 26', 32'	Stadium: Al Janoub Stadium; Attendance: 43,443; Referee: Daniel Siebert (Germany)

=== 2023 ===
24 March 2023 2023 Kirin Challenge Cup	Japan	1–1	Uruguay	Tokyo, Japan
19:30 UTC+9	Nishimura 75'	Report	Valverde 38'	Stadium: Japan National Stadium; Attendance: 61,855; Referee: Ko Hyung-jin (South Korea)

28 March 2023 Friendly	South Korea	1–2	Uruguay	Seoul, South Korea
20:00 UTC+9	Hwang In-beom 51'	Report	Coates 10'; Vecino 63'	Stadium: Seoul World Cup Stadium; Attendance: 63,952; Referee: Yudai Yamamoto (Japan)

14 June 2023 Friendly	Uruguay	4–1	Nicaragua	Montevideo, Uruguay
20:30 UTC−3	Arezo 8'; Zalazar 37', 82'; Brian 56'	Report	Coronel 90+2'	Stadium: Estadio Centenario; Referee: Wagner do Nascimento Magalhães (Brazil)

20 June 2023 Friendly	Uruguay	2–0	Cuba	Montevideo, Uruguay
20:30 UTC−3	Torres 27' (pen.); Araújo 80'	Report		Stadium: Estadio Centenario; Referee: Bráulio da Silva Machado (Brazil)

8 September 2023 2026 World Cup qualification	Uruguay	3–1	Chile	Montevideo, Uruguay
20:00 UTC−3	De la Cruz 38', 71'; Valverde 45+2'	Report	Vidal 74'	Stadium: Estadio Centenario; Attendance: 49,713; Referee: Darío Herrera (Argentina)

12 September 2023 2026 World Cup qualification	Ecuador	2–1	Uruguay	Quito, Ecuador
16:00 UTC−5	Torres 45+5', 61'	Report	Canobbio 38'	Stadium: Estadio Rodrigo Paz Delgado; Attendance: 35,613; Referee: Wilton Sampaio (Brazil)

12 October 2023 2026 World Cup qualification	Colombia	2–2	Uruguay	Barranquilla, Colombia
15:30 UTC−5	Rodríguez 35'; Uribe 52'	Report	Olivera 47'; Núñez 90+1' (pen.)	Stadium: Estadio Metropolitano Roberto Meléndez; Attendance: 43,915; Referee: Piero Maza (Chile)

17 October 2023 2026 World Cup qualification	Uruguay	2–0	Brazil	Montevideo, Uruguay
21:00 UTC−3	Núñez 42'; De la Cruz 77'	Report		Stadium: Estadio Centenario; Attendance: 52,477; Referee: Alexis Herrera (Venezuela)

16 November 2023 2026 World Cup qualification	Argentina	0–2	Uruguay	Buenos Aires, Argentina
21:00 UTC−3		Report	Araújo 41'; Núñez 87'	Stadium: La Bombonera; Attendance: 51,900; Referee: Wilmar Roldán (Colombia)

21 November 2023 2026 World Cup qualification	Uruguay	3–0	Bolivia	Montevideo, Uruguay
20:30 UTC−3	Núñez 15', 71'; Villamíl 39' (o.g.)	Report		Stadium: Estadio Centenario; Attendance: 46,100; Referee: Kevin Ortega (Peru)

=== 2024 ===
23 March 2024 Non-FIFA Friendly	Basque Country	1–1	Uruguay	Bilbao, Spain
20:00 UTC+1	Djaló 44'	Report	Vecino 46'	Stadium: Estadio San Mamés

26 March 2024 Friendly	Ivory Coast	2–1	Uruguay	Lens, France
20:30 UTC+1	M. Olivera 10' (o.g.); Doué 85'	Report	Viñas 77'	Stadium: Stade Bollaert-Delelis; Referee: Ruddy Buquet (France)

5 June 2024 Friendly	Mexico	0–4	Uruguay	Denver, United States
19:00 UTC−6		Report	Núñez 7', 44', 49'; Pellistri 26'	Stadium: Empower Field at Mile High; Attendance: 57,852; Referee: Oshane Nation (Jamaica)

23 June 2024 2024 Copa América GS	Uruguay	3–1	Panama	Miami Gardens, United States
21:00 UTC−4	M. Araújo 16'; Núñez 85'; Viña 90+1'	Report	Murillo 90+4'	Stadium: Hard Rock Stadium; Attendance: 33,425; Referee: Piero Maza (Chile)

27 June 2024 2024 Copa América GS	Uruguay	5–0	Bolivia	East Rutherford, United States
21:00 UTC−4	Pellistri 8'; Núñez 21'; M. Araújo 77'; Valverde 81'; Bentancur 89'	Report		Stadium: MetLife Stadium; Attendance: 48,033; Referee: Juan Benitez (Paraguay)

1 July 2024 2024 Copa América GS	United States	0–1	Uruguay	Kansas City, United States
20:00 UTC−5		Report	M. Olivera 66'	Stadium: Arrowhead Stadium; Attendance: 55,460; Referee: Kevin Ortega (Peru)

6 July 2024 2024 Copa América QF	Uruguay	0–0 (4–2 p)	Brazil	Paradise, United States
18:00 UTC−7		Report		Stadium: Allegiant Stadium; Attendance: 55,770; Referee: Darío Herrera (Argentina)
	Penalties
	Valverde (penalty scored); Bentancur (penalty scored); De Arrascaeta (penalty scored); Giménez (penalty missed); Ugarte (penalty scored)		(penalty missed) Militão; (penalty scored) A. Pereira; (penalty missed) Douglas Luiz; (penalty scored) Martinelli

10 July 2024 2024 Copa América SF	Uruguay	0–1	Colombia	Charlotte, United States
20:00 UTC−4		Report	Lerma 39'	Stadium: Bank of America Stadium; Attendance: 70,644; Referee: César Ramos (Mexico)

13 July 2024 2024 Copa América 3rd place	Canada	2–2 (3–4 p)	Uruguay	Charlotte, United States
20:00 UTC−4	Koné 22'; David 80'	Report	Bentancur 8'; Suárez 90+2'	Stadium: Bank of America Stadium; Attendance: 24,386; Referee: Alexis Herrera (Venezuela)
	Penalties
	David (penalty scored); Bombito (penalty scored); Koné (penalty missed); Choinière (penalty scored); Davies (penalty missed)		(penalty scored) Valverde; (penalty scored) Bentancur; (penalty scored) De Arrascaeta; (penalty scored) Suárez

6 September 2024 2026 World Cup qualification	Uruguay	0–0	Paraguay	Montevideo, Uruguay
20:30 UTC−3		Report		Stadium: Estadio Centenario; Attendance: 47,741; Referee: Darío Herrera (Argentina)

10 September 2024 2026 World Cup qualification	Venezuela	0–0	Uruguay	Maturín, Venezuela
18:00 UTC−4		Report		Stadium: Estadio Monumental; Referee: Raphael Claus (Brazil)

11 October 2024 2026 World Cup qualification	Peru	1–0	Uruguay	Lima, Peru
20:30 UTC−5	Araujo 88'	Report		Stadium: Estadio Nacional; Referee: Facundo Tello (Argentina)

15 October 2024 2026 World Cup qualification	Uruguay	0–0	Ecuador	Montevideo, Uruguay
20:30 UTC−3		Report		Stadium: Estadio Centenario; Attendance: 27,112; Referee: Cristian Garay (Chile)

15 November 2024 2026 World Cup qualification	Uruguay	3–2	Colombia	Montevideo, Uruguay
21:00 UTC−3	Sánchez 57' (o.g.); Aguirre 60'; Ugarte 90+11'	Report	Quintero 31'; Gómez 90+6'	Stadium: Estadio Centenario; Attendance: 33,400; Referee: Kevin Ortega (Peru)

19 November 2024 2026 World Cup qualification	Brazil	1–1	Uruguay	Salvador, Brazil
21:45 UTC−3	Gerson 62'	Report	Valverde 55'	Stadium: Arena Fonte Nova; Attendance: 41,511; Referee: Piero Maza (Chile)

=== 2025 ===
21 March 2025 2026 World Cup qualification	Uruguay	0–1	Argentina	Montevideo, Uruguay
20:30 UTC−3		Report	Almada 68'	Stadium: Estadio Centenario; Referee: Juan Gabriel Benítez (Paraguay)

25 March 2025 2026 World Cup qualification	Bolivia	0–0	Uruguay	El Alto, Bolivia
16:00 UTC−4		Report		Stadium: Estadio Municipal de El Alto; Attendance: 10,723; Referee: Augusto Aragón (Ecuador)

5 June 2025 2026 World Cup qualification	Paraguay	2–0	Uruguay	Asunción, Paraguay
20:00 UTC−3	Galarza 13'; Enciso 81' (pen.)	Report		Stadium: Estadio Defensores del Chaco; Attendance: 30,005; Referee: Darío Herrera (Argentina)

10 June 2025 2026 World Cup qualification	Uruguay	2–0	Venezuela	Montevideo, Uruguay
20:00 UTC−3	Aguirre 43'; De Arrascaeta 47'	Report		Stadium: Estadio Centenario; Attendance: 29,672; Referee: Raphael Claus (Brazil)

4 September 2025 2026 World Cup qualification	Uruguay	3–0	Peru	Montevideo, Uruguay
20:30 UTC−3	Aguirre 14'; De Arrascaeta 58'; Viñas 80'	Report		Stadium: Estadio Centenario; Referee: Facundo Tello (Argentina)

9 September 2025 2026 World Cup qualification	Chile	0–0	Uruguay	Santiago, Chile
20:30 UTC−3		Report		Stadium: Estadio Nacional Julio Martínez Prádanos; Referee: Anderson Daronco (Brazil)

10 October 2025 Friendly	Uruguay	1–0	Dominican Republic	Kuala Lumpur, Malaysia
20:45 UTC+8	Laquintana 60'	Report		Stadium: Bukit Jalil National Stadium; Referee: Razlan Joffri Al (Malaysia)

13 October 2025 Friendly	Uzbekistan	1–2	Uruguay	Malacca City, Malaysia
20:45 UTC+8	Jiyanov 82'	Report	Torres 51'; Sanabria 60'	Stadium: Hang Jebat Stadium; Referee: Muhammad Kamaruzaman (Malaysia)

15 November 2025 Friendly	Mexico	0–0	Uruguay	Torreón, Mexico
19:00 UTC−6		Report		Stadium: Estadio Corona; Attendance: 24,000; Referee: Fernando Morón (Panama)

18 November 2025 Friendly	United States	5–1	Uruguay	Tampa, United States
19:00 UTC−5	Berhalter 17'; Freeman 20', 31'; Luna 42'; Tessmann 68'	Report	De Arrascaeta 45+1'	Stadium: Raymond James Stadium; Attendance: 26,110; Referee: Julio Luna (Guatemala)

=== 2026 ===
27 March 2026 Friendly	England	1–1	Uruguay	London, England
19:45 UTC+0	White 81'	Report	Valverde 90+4' (pen.)	Stadium: Wembley Stadium; Attendance: 80,581; Referee: Sven Jablonski (Germany)

31 March 2026 Friendly	Algeria	0–0	Uruguay	Turin, Italy
20:45 UTC+2		Report		Stadium: Juventus Stadium; Attendance: 11,000; Referee: Luca Pairetto (Italy)

15 June 2026 2026 World Cup GS	Saudi Arabia	1–1	Uruguay	Miami Gardens, United States
18:00 UTC−4	Al-Amri 41'	Report	M. Araújo 80'	Stadium: Hard Rock Stadium; Attendance: 62,764; Referee: Maurizio Mariani (Italy)

21 June 2026 2026 World Cup GS	Uruguay	2–2	Cape Verde	Miami Gardens, United States
18:00 UTC−4	M. Araújo 44'; Canobbio 45+6'	Report	Pina 21'; Varela 61'	Stadium: Hard Rock Stadium; Attendance: 64,003; Referee: Espen Eskås (Norway)

26 June 2026 2026 World Cup GS	Uruguay	0–1	Spain	Zapopan, Mexico
18:00 UTC−6		Report	Baena 42'	Stadium: Estadio Akron; Attendance: 45,065; Referee: Ismail Elfath (United States)

24 September 2026 Kirin Challenge Cup 2026	Japan	3–1	Uruguay	Rifu, Japan
19:05 UTC+9	Matsuki 11'; Shiogai 90+2'; Ueda 90+6'	Report	M. Araújo 42'	Stadium: Q&A Stadium; Attendance: 44,070; Referee: Alex King (Australia)

28 September 2026 Friendly	South Korea	1–4	Uruguay	Seoul, South Korea
20:00 UTC+9	Son Heung-min 80'	Report	Núñez 13', 62'; De Arrascaeta 27'; Kim Min-jae 43' (o.g.)	Stadium: Seoul World Cup Stadium; Attendance: 48,024; Referee: Ma Ning (China)

6 October 2026 Friendly	India	1–6	Uruguay	Kolkata, India
19:00 UTC+5:30	Thapa 22'	Report	Núñez 11' (pen.); M. Araújo 28', 59'; Zalazar 53'; Sanabria 71'; Aguirre 86'	Stadium: Salt Lake Stadium; Attendance: 37,307; Referee: Rustam Lutfullin (Uzbekistan)

13 November 2026 Friendly	Argentina	1–2	Uruguay	Buenos Aires, Argentina
20:00 UTC−3	Álvarez 73'	Report	Balerdi 48' (o.g.); M. Araújo 53'	Stadium: La Bombonera; Referee: Flávio Rodrigues de Souza (Brazil)

17 November 2026 Friendly	Uruguay	5–0	Dominican Republic	Maldonado, Uruguay
20:30 UTC−3	Aguirre 41'; Valdez 70' (o.g.); De la Cruz 80' (pen.); Valverde 87'; Damiani 90+4'	Report		Stadium: Estadio Domingo Burgueño; Referee: Matheus Delgado (Brazil)
