= Ervin Vaca =

Bolivian association footballer

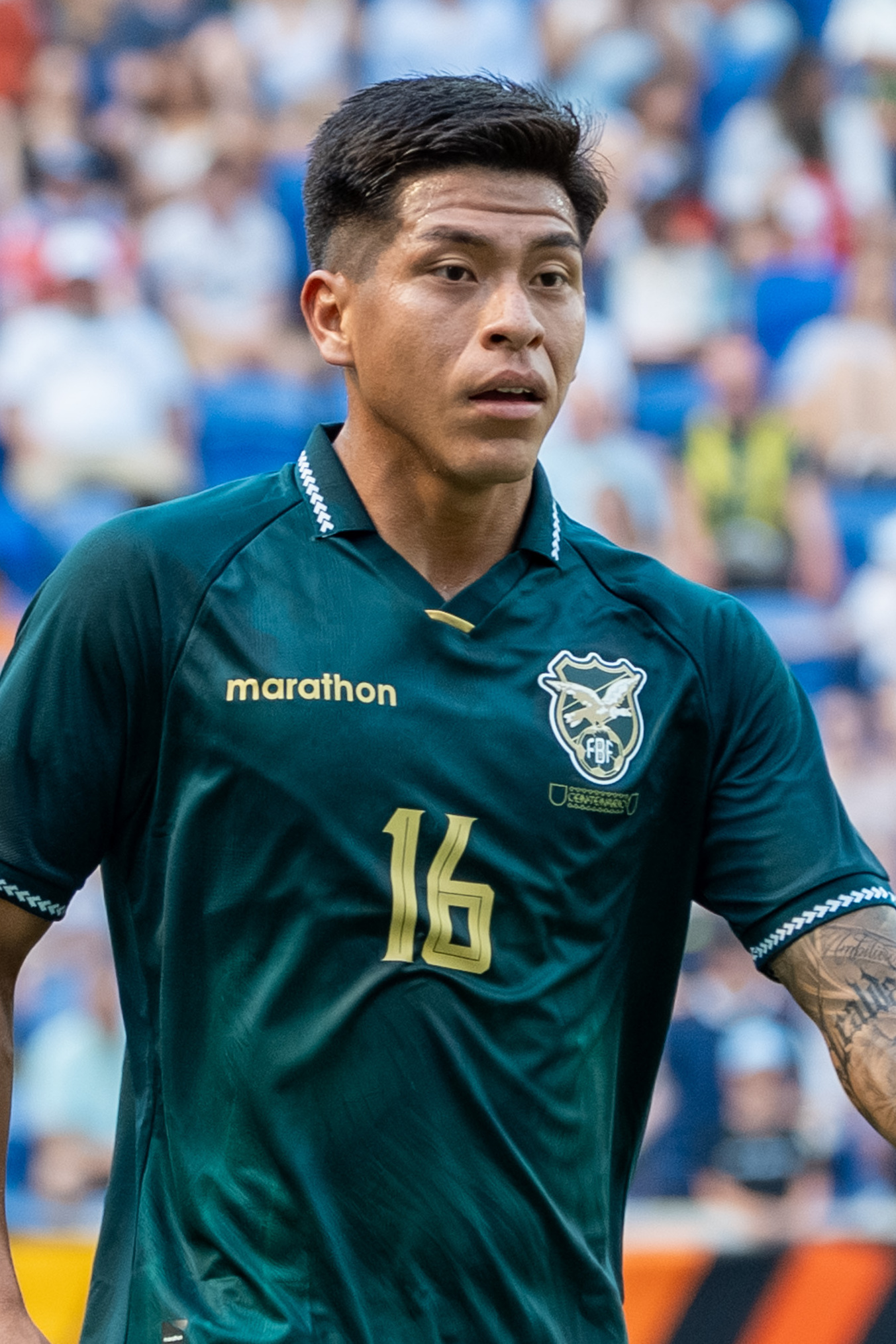
- Vaca in 2026

Personal information
- Full name: Ervin Vaca Moreno
- Date of birth: 18 March 2004 (age 22)
- Place of birth: Santa Cruz de la Sierra, Bolivia
- Height: 1.76 m (5 ft 9 in)
- Position: Midfielder

Team information
- Current team: Bolívar
- Number: 33

Youth career
- Calleja
- 2022–2023: Colo-Colo

Senior career*
Years	Team	Apps	(Gls)
2023–	Bolívar	71	(4)
2023	→ Lommel (loan)	0	(0)

International career^{‡}
2022–2023	Bolivia U20	6	(0)
2023–	Bolivia	16	(1)
- * Club domestic league appearances and goals as of 17 September 2026 ‡ National team caps and goals as of 10 June 2026

Ervin Vaca Moreno (born 18 March 2004) is a Bolivian footballer who plays as a midfielder for Bolívar and the Bolivia national team.

== Early life ==
As a youth player, Vaca joined the Tahuichi Aguilera Academy. He has been regarded as a Bolivia prospect.

== Club career ==
Vaca started his career with Bolivian lower league side Calleja. In 2022, he signed for Chilean top flight side Colo-Colo, helping the club's youth academy win the "More than a Passion" tournament. In 2023, he signed for Bolivian side Bolívar.

In October 2023, he moved to Europe to train with Belgian side Lommel SK for a month.

== International career ==
Vaca has represented Bolivia internationally at youth level.

At senior level, Vaca received his first call-up for the 2026 FIFA World Cup qualifiers against Brazil and Argentina in September 2023. He made his debut in the match against Chile on 10 September 2024.

== Style of play ==
Vaca mainly operates as a midfielder and is left-footed.

== Career statistics ==
=== International ===
As of match played 10 June 2026

National team	Year	Apps	Goals
Bolivia	2024	3	1
Bolivia	2025	7	0
Bolivia	2026	6	0
Total		16	1

Scores and results list Bolivia's goal tally first, score column indicates score after each Vaca goal.

List of international goals scored by Ervin Vaca
No.	Date	Venue	Opponent	Score	Result	Competition
1	19 November 2024	Estadio Municipal de El Alto, El Alto, Bolivia	Paraguay	1–0	2–2	2026 FIFA World Cup qualification
