= Enzo Monteiro =

Bolivian-Brazilian footballer (born 2004)

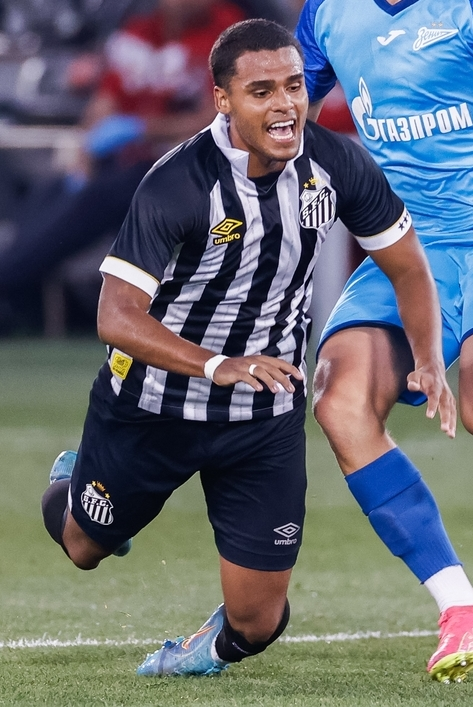
- Monteiro playing with Santos in 2024

Personal information
- Full name: Enzo Eduardo Monteiro de Castro Becerra
- Date of birth: 27 May 2004 (age 22)
- Place of birth: Santa Cruz de la Sierra, Bolivia
- Height: 1.78 m (5 ft 10 in)
- Position: Forward

Team information
- Current team: Chungbuk Cheongju (on loan from Santos)

Youth career
- 2008–2015: Toreto Garcia
- 2015–2017: Blooming
- 2017–2018: Proyecto Bolivia 2022
- 2018–2025: Santos

Senior career*
Years	Team	Apps	(Gls)
2024–	Santos	1	(0)
2025	→ Auda (loan)	33	(4)
2026–	→ Chungbuk Cheongju (loan)	6	(0)

International career^{‡}
2019	Bolivia U15	5	(0)
2023–	Bolivia	13	(2)
- * Club domestic league appearances and goals as of 15:38, 19 May 2026 (UTC) ‡ National team caps and goals as of 23:13, 31 March 2026 (UTC)

Enzo Eduardo Monteiro de Castro Becerra (born 27 May 2004) is a Bolivian professional footballer who plays as a forward for K League 2 club Chungbuk Cheongju, on loan from Campeonato Brasileiro Série A club Santos, and the Bolivia national team.

== Club career ==
Born in Santa Cruz de la Sierra as his father was playing in the country at the time, Monteiro started his career with a local football school named Toreto Garcia at the age of four. At the age of eleven, he joined professional side Blooming. Still, only two years later, he joined Proyecto Bolivia 2022, a project created to encourage the development of young Bolivian men's footballers.

In late 2018, Monteiro moved to Brazil, signing with Santos at the same time as Proyecto Bolivia 2022 teammates Miguel Terceros and Christian Osinaga. Shortly after, the pair were joined by Leonardo Zabala, who Monteiro has known since he was nine, as their parents played football together in Bolivia.

Monteiro signed his first professional contract with Santos in June 2022, signing a three-year deal with the option for two additional years. He made his first team debut on 20 April 2024, starting in a 2–0 Série B home win over Paysandu.

On 3 February 2025, Santos loaned Monteiro to FK Auda of the Latvian Higher League for the season. On 8 January 2026, he renewed with Santos until the end of 2027, and was loaned to K League 2 side Chungbuk Cheongju until the end of the year.

== International career ==
Monteiro represented Bolivia at the 2019 South American U-15 Championship, making five appearances. On 18 August 2023, he was called up to the full side for a friendly against Panama, and made his full international debut eleven days later, coming on as a late substitute for Víctor Ábrego in the 2–1 loss at the Estadio Félix Capriles in Cochabamba.

== Personal life ==
Monteiro's father Edu Monteiro is a former Brazilian footballer who also played forward. His older brother Ronaldo, also born in Bolivia, plays as a forward as well.

== Career statistics ==
=== Club ===
As of 19 May 2026

Club	Season	League			State league		Cup		Continental		Total	
Club	Season	Division	Apps	Goals	Apps	Goals	Apps	Goals	Apps	Goals	Apps	Goals
Santos	2024	Série B	1	0	—		—		—		1	0
Auda (loan)	2025	Latvian Higher League	33	4	—		4	0	2 (Note: Appearances in UEFA Conference League)	1	39	5
Chungbuk Cheongju (loan)	2026	K League 2	6	0	—		0	0	—		6	0
Career total			40	4	0	0	4	0	2	1	46	5

=== International ===
As of 31 March 2026

National team	Year	Competitive		Friendly		Total	
National team	Year	Apps	Goals	Apps	Goals	Apps	Goals
Bolivia	2023	0	0	1	0	1	0
Bolivia	2024	4	1	0	0	4	1
Bolivia	2025	3	1	3	0	6	1
Bolivia	2026	2	0	0	0	2	0
Total		9	1	4	0	13	2

Scores and results list Bolivia's goal tally first.

No	Date	Venue	Opponent	Score	Result	Competition
1.	5 September 2024	El Alto Municipal Stadium, El Alto, Bolivia	Venezuela	4–0	4–0	2026 FIFA World Cup qualification
2.	9 June 2025	El Alto Municipal Stadium, El Alto, Bolivia	Chile	2–0	2–0	2026 FIFA World Cup qualification

== Honours ==
Santos

- Campeonato Paulista Sub-20: 2022
- Campeonato Brasileiro Série B: 2024

Auda

- Latvian Cup: 2025
