= Christian Osinaga =

Bolivian footballer (born 2004)

Personal information
- Full name: Christian Jorge Osinaga Viruez
- Date of birth: 21 January 2004 (age 22)
- Place of birth: Santa Cruz de la Sierra, Bolivia
- Position: Centre back

Team information
- Current team: Totora Real Oruro

Youth career
- Proyecto Bolivia 2022
- 2018–2022: Santos
- 2022: → Bolívar (loan)
- 2023: Bolívar

Senior career*
Years	Team	Apps	(Gls)
2022	Santos	0	(0)
2022	→ Bolívar (loan)	1	(0)
2023	Bolívar	0	(0)
2024	Argentinos Juniors BOL		
2025	Barcelona-RO	9	(0)
2025–	Totora Real Oruro	0	(0)

International career
2018	Bolivia U16		
- * Club domestic league appearances and goals as of 13:47, 13 November 2025 (UTC)

Christian Jorge Osinaga Viruez (born 21 January 2004) is a Bolivian football player who plays as central defender for Totora Real Oruro.

== Club career ==
Born in Santa Cruz de la Sierra, Osinaga began his career with a social project in his hometown, Proyecto Bolivia 2022, before joining the youth categories of Brazilian club Santos in 2018, along with compatriots Miguel Terceros and Enzo Monteiro. On 15 January 2022, he was loaned to Bolívar back in his home country for one year, with a buyout clause.

Osinaga made his first team – and División de Fútbol Profesional – debut on 7 August 2022, starting in a 2–1 away loss against Nacional Potosí.

== Personal life ==
Osinaga's father Marco was also a footballer. A forward, he came to prominence at Destroyers but had to retire at the age of 24 due to injuries.

== Career statistics ==
As of 13 November 2025

Club	Season	League			Cup		Continental		State league		Total	
Club	Season	Division	Apps	Goals	Apps	Goals	Apps	Goals	Apps	Goals	Apps	Goals
Bolívar	2022	División Profesional	1	0	—		0	0	—		1	0
Barcelona-RO	2025	Rondoniense	—		—		—		9	0	9	0
Career total			1	0	0	0	0	0	9	0	10	0
