= Héctor Cuéllar =

Bolivian footballer (born 2000)

Personal information
- Full name: Héctor Manuel Cuéllar Rosales
- Date of birth: 16 August 2000 (age 26)
- Place of birth: Santa Cruz, Bolivia
- Height: 1.80 m (5 ft 11 in)
- Position: Midfielder

Team information
- Current team: CSKA 1948
- Number: 33

Senior career*
Years	Team	Apps	(Gls)
2022–2023	Universitario Vinto	40	(1)
2023–2026	Always Ready	85	(11)
2026–	CSKA 1948	6	(0)

International career^{‡}
2023–	Bolivia	28	(0)
- * Club domestic league appearances and goals as of 19:20, 19 September 2026 (UTC) ‡ National team caps and goals as of 22:15, 30 September 2026 (UTC)

Héctor Manuel Cuéllar Rosales (born 16 August 2000) is a Bolivian professional footballer who plays as a midfielder for Bulgarian First League club CSKA 1948 Sofia and the Bolivia national team.

He played for Universitario de Vinto and Always Ready in the Bolivian Primera División. He made his senior international debut for Bolivia in 2023 and was chosen for the 2024 Copa América.

== Club career ==
Born in Santa Cruz de la Sierra, Cuéllar began his career at F.C. Universitario de Vinto. He made his debut in the Bolivian Primera División on 2 April 2022, playing the full 90 minutes of a 2–2 home draw with Club Independiente Petrolero. He made 41 top-flight appearances and scored once for the club, equalising with a penalty in a 1–1 draw with the same opponents also at the Estadio Félix Capriles.

In June 2023, Cuéllar transferred to Club Always Ready halfway through the season, in a deal involving the trade of another player. On his debut on 25 June, he scored the first goal of a 2–0 home win over Club Blooming; in his next game on 9 July he scored from 35 metres in a 3–1 comeback win over Club Aurora at the Estadio Municipal de El Alto.

On his continental debut on 21 February 2024, Cuéllar scored in a 6–1 home win over Peru's Sporting Cristal in the Copa Libertadores. After Always Ready were eliminated and dropped into the Copa Sudamericana, he netted in a 2–0 group stage win against Club Deportivo Universidad César Vallejo visiting from the same country, as well as a 3–0 win in the next game against Argentina's Defensa y Justicia.

== International career ==
Cuéllar made his debut for the Bolivia national team on 27 August 2023 in a 2–1 friendly loss to Panama in Cochabamba. He played the first 64 minutes before being replaced by Julio Herrera. On 8 September, he made his competitive bow in a 5–1 loss away to Brazil in the 2026 FIFA World Cup qualifiers; he came into the game in place of Diego Bejarano around the hour, and was praised for his performance by manager Gustavo Costas.

Cuéllar was named in the 29-man preliminary squad for the 2024 Copa América in the United States. On 15 June, in a pre-tournament friendly against Colombia, he committed a foul on Luis Díaz that caused a brawl that led to a player on each team being sent off, though Cuéllar received only a yellow card.

In Bolivia's first game of the tournament, Cuéllar debuted as a half-time substitute with his country losing 2–0 to the United States at the AT&T Stadium; there were no more goals from either side. He then started in defence in further defeats to Uruguay and Panama in a group-stage elimination.

On 10 October 2024, Cuéllar was sent off after 20 minutes of a 1–0 home win over Colombia in World Cup qualifying, for fouling Roger Martínez who was clear through on goal. The Colombian forward had to be substituted through injury.

== Career statistics ==
=== Club ===
As of match played 19 September 2026

Appearances and goals by club, season and competition
Club	Season	League			National cup		League Cup		Continental		Total	
Club	Season	Division	Apps	Goals	Apps	Goals	Apps	Goals	Apps	Goals	Apps	Goals
Universitario Vinto	2022	FBF División Profesional	25	0	—		—		—		25	0
Universitario Vinto	2023	FBF División Profesional	15	1	—		2	0	—		17	0
Universitario Vinto	Total		40	1	—		2	0	—		42	0
Always Ready	2023	FBF División Profesional	16	3	—		10	1	—		26	4
Always Ready	2024	FBF División Profesional	35	2	—		—		12 (Note: Four appearances and one goal in Copa Libertadores, eight appearances and two goals in Copa Sudamericana)	3	47	5
Always Ready	2025	FBF División Profesional	28	5	10	1	—		—		38	6
Always Ready	2026	FBF División Profesional	6	1	0	0	—		5 (Note: Appearances in Copa Libertadores)	0	11	1
Always Ready	Total		85	11	10	1	12	1	17	3	124	16
CSKA 1948	2026–27	First Professional Football League	6	0	0	0	4 (Note: Appearances in UEFA Conference League)	0	—		10	0
Career total			153	12	10	1	16	1	17	3	196	17

=== International ===
As of match played 30 September 2026

National team	Year	Apps	Goals
Bolivia	2023	6	0
Bolivia	2024	8	0
Bolivia	2025	10	0
Bolivia	2026	4	0
Total		28	0
