= 2026 FIFA World Cup qualification (CONMEBOL) =

Tournament details
- Dates: 7 September 2023 – 9 September 2025
- Teams: 10 (from 1 confederation)

Tournament statistics
- Matches played: 90
- Goals scored: 183 (2.03 per match)
- Attendance: 3,437,526 (38,195 per match)
- Top scorer: (Argentina) Lionel Messi (8 goals)

The South American section of the 2026 FIFA World Cup qualification acted as qualifiers for the 2026 FIFA World Cup held in Canada, Mexico, and the United States, for national teams who were members of CONMEBOL. A total of 6 direct slots in the final tournament and 1 inter-confederation play-off slot were available for CONMEBOL teams.

CONMEBOL was the first confederation to begin its qualification process for the 2026 FIFA World Cup, with Paraguay–Peru being the first match of the global qualification process.

== Format ==
On 22 August 2022, CONMEBOL sent a request to FIFA asking to keep the current qualification format that had been used since the 1998 World Cup qualification in South America. This was confirmed, with the first games of the qualifiers tentatively to be played in March or June 2023.

On 27 February 2023, CONMEBOL president Alejandro Domínguez announced that the qualifiers would start in September 2023, which was ratified by the CONMEBOL Council in the run-up to the 73rd FIFA Congress held on 16 March in Kigali, Rwanda.

The qualification structure remained the same as in previous editions (despite the increase of slots available to CONMEBOL teams), wherein each team played each other team twice in a home-and-away round-robin format.

Prior to the commencement of the qualification competition, Ecuador were deducted 3 points for the use of a document containing false information for Byron Castillo in the previous World Cup qualification cycle.

== Schedule ==
The qualifying matches were held on a total of 18 matchdays on dates that fall within the FIFA International Match Calendar. The match schedule was the same that was used in the previous edition of the competition. Six matchdays were played in each of 2023, 2024, and 2025.

2023
Matchday	Date	Ref.
Matchday 1	7–8 September 2023	
Matchday 2	12 September 2023	
Matchday 3	12 October 2023	
Matchday 4	17 October 2023	
Matchday 5	16 November 2023	
Matchday 6	21 November 2023	

2024
Matchday	Date	Ref.
Matchday 7	5–6 September 2024	
Matchday 8	10 September 2024	
Matchday 9	10–11 October 2024	
Matchday 10	15 October 2024	
Matchday 11	14–15 November 2024	
Matchday 12	19 November 2024	

2025
Matchday	Date	Ref.
Matchday 13	20–21 March 2025	
Matchday 14	25 March 2025	
Matchday 15	5–6 June 2025	
Matchday 16	10 June 2025	
Matchday 17	4 September 2025	
Matchday 18	9 September 2025	

== Entrants ==
All 10 national teams from CONMEBOL entered qualification.

Team	FIFA ranking as of July 2023
Argentina	1
Brazil	3
Uruguay	16
Colombia	17
Peru	21
Chile	32
Ecuador	40
Paraguay	49
Venezuela	57
Bolivia	83

== Standings ==
Pos	Team	Pld	W	D	L	GF	GA	GD	Pts	Qualification	(Argentina)	(Ecuador)	(Colombia)	(Uruguay)	(Brazil)	(Paraguay)	(Bolivia)	(Venezuela)	(Peru)	(Chile)
1	Argentina	18	12	2	4	31	10	+21	38	2026 FIFA World Cup	—	1–0	1–1	0–2	4–1	1–0	6–0	3–0	1–0	3–0
2	Ecuador	18	8	8	2	14	5	+9	29 (Note: Ecuador were penalized 3 points for the use of false birth documents for Byron Castillo in the previous World Cup qualification cycle.)	2026 FIFA World Cup	1–0	—	0–0	2–1	0–0	0–0	4–0	2–1	1–0	1–0
3	Colombia	18	7	7	4	28	18	+10	28	2026 FIFA World Cup	2–1	0–1	—	2–2	2–1	2–2	3–0	1–0	0–0	4–0
4	Uruguay	18	7	7	4	22	12	+10	28	2026 FIFA World Cup	0–1	0–0	3–2	—	2–0	0–0	3–0	2–0	3–0	3–1
5	Brazil	18	8	4	6	24	17	+7	28	2026 FIFA World Cup	0–1	1–0	2–1	1–1	—	1–0	5–1	1–1	4–0	3–0
6	Paraguay	18	7	7	4	14	10	+4	28	2026 FIFA World Cup	2–1	0–0	0–1	2–0	1–0	—	1–0	2–1	0–0	1–0
7	Bolivia	18	6	2	10	17	35	−18	20	Inter-confederation play-offs	0–3	1–2	1–0	0–0	1–0	2–2	—	4–0	2–0	2–0
8	Venezuela	18	4	6	8	18	28	−10	18		1–1	0–0	3–6	0–0	1–1	1–0	2–0	—	1–0	3–0
9	Peru	18	2	6	10	6	21	−15	12		0–2	0–0	1–1	1–0	0–1	0–1	3–1	1–1	—	0–0
10	Chile	18	2	5	11	9	27	−18	11		0–1	0–0	0–0	0–0	1–2	0–0	1–2	4–2	2–0	—

Source: FIFA
Rules for classification: Tiebreakers

== Matches ==
=== Matchday 1 ===
7 September 2023
18:30 UTC−4

Paraguay	0–0	Peru
	Report (FIFA); Report (CONMEBOL)

Estadio Antonio Aranda, Ciudad del Este
Attendance: 16,211
Referee: Andrés Matonte (Uruguay)

7 September 2023
18:00 UTC−5

Colombia	1–0	Venezuela
Borré 46'	Report (FIFA); Report (CONMEBOL)

Estadio Metropolitano Roberto Meléndez, Barranquilla
Attendance: 43,084
Referee: Anderson Daronco (Brazil)

7 September 2023
21:00 UTC−3

Argentina	1–0	Ecuador
Messi 78'	Report (FIFA); Report (CONMEBOL)

Estadio Monumental, Buenos Aires
Attendance: 82,500
Referee: Wilmar Roldán (Colombia)

8 September 2023
20:00 UTC−3

Uruguay	3–1	Chile
De la Cruz 38', 71'; Valverde 45+2'	Report (FIFA); Report (CONMEBOL)	Vidal 74'

Estadio Centenario, Montevideo
Attendance: 49,713
Referee: Darío Herrera (Argentina)

8 September 2023
21:45 UTC−3

Brazil	5–1	Bolivia
Rodrygo 24', 53'; Raphinha 47'; Neymar 61', 90+3'	Report (FIFA); Report (CONMEBOL)	Ábrego 78'

Mangueirão, Belém
Attendance: 48,183
Referee: Juan Gabriel Benítez (Paraguay)

=== Matchday 2 ===
12 September 2023
16:00 UTC−4

Bolivia	0–3	Argentina
	Report (FIFA); Report (CONMEBOL)	Fernández 31'; Tagliafico 42'; González 83'

Estadio Hernando Siles, La Paz
Attendance: 38,000
Referee: Esteban Ostojich (Uruguay)

12 September 2023
16:00 UTC−5

Ecuador	2–1	Uruguay
Torres 45+5', 61'	Report (FIFA); Report (CONMEBOL)	Canobbio 38'

Estadio Rodrigo Paz Delgado, Quito
Attendance: 35,613
Referee: Wilton Sampaio (Brazil)

12 September 2023
18:00 UTC−4

Venezuela	1–0	Paraguay
Rondón 90+3' (pen.)	Report (FIFA); Report (CONMEBOL)

Estadio Monumental, Maturín
Attendance: 48,523
Referee: Andrés Rojas (Colombia)

12 September 2023
21:30 UTC−3

Chile	0–0	Colombia
	Report (FIFA); Report (CONMEBOL)

Estadio Monumental David Arellano, Santiago
Attendance: 22,153
Referee: Jesús Valenzuela (Venezuela)

12 September 2023
21:00 UTC−5

Peru	0–1	Brazil
	Report (FIFA); Report (CONMEBOL)	Marquinhos 90'

Estadio Nacional, Lima
Attendance: 36,328
Referee: Fernando Rapallini (Argentina)

=== Matchday 3 ===
12 October 2023
15:30 UTC−5

Colombia	2–2	Uruguay
Rodríguez 35'; Uribe 52'	Report (FIFA); Report (CONMEBOL)	M. Olivera 47'; Núñez 90+1' (pen.)

Estadio Metropolitano Roberto Meléndez, Barranquilla
Attendance: 43,915
Referee: Piero Maza (Chile)

12 October 2023
19:00 UTC−4 (Note: The Bolivia v Ecuador match, originally scheduled at 16:00 local time, was rescheduled to 19:00 local time by decision of the Bolivian Football Federation.)

Bolivia	1–2	Ecuador
Ramallo 83'	Report (FIFA); Report (CONMEBOL)	Páez 45'; Rodríguez 90+6'

Estadio Hernando Siles, La Paz
Attendance: 34,200
Referee: Cristián Garay (Chile)

12 October 2023
20:00 UTC−3

Argentina	1–0	Paraguay
Otamendi 3'	Report (FIFA); Report (CONMEBOL)

Estadio Monumental, Buenos Aires
Attendance: 80,000
Referee: Raphael Claus (Brazil)

12 October 2023
21:00 UTC−3

Chile	2–0	Peru
Valdés 74'; Núñez 90+1'	Report (FIFA); Report (CONMEBOL)

Estadio Monumental David Arellano, Santiago
Attendance: 36,847
Referee: Wilmar Roldán (Colombia)

12 October 2023
20:30 UTC−4

Brazil	1–1	Venezuela
Gabriel 50'	Report (FIFA); Report (CONMEBOL)	Bello 85'

Arena Pantanal, Cuiabá
Attendance: 39,018
Referee: Kevin Ortega (Peru)

=== Matchday 4 ===
17 October 2023
17:00 UTC−4

Venezuela	3–0	Chile
Soteldo 45+1'; Rondón 72'; Machís 79'	Report (FIFA); Report (CONMEBOL)

Estadio Monumental, Maturín
Attendance: 50,932
Referee: Flavio de Souza (Brazil)

17 October 2023
19:30 UTC−3

Paraguay	1–0	Bolivia
Sanabria 69'	Report (FIFA); Report (CONMEBOL)

Estadio Defensores del Chaco, Asunción (Note: The Paraguay v Bolivia match, originally scheduled at Estadio Antonio Aranda, Ciudad del Este, was rescheduled at Estadio Defensores del Chaco, Asunción by decision of the Paraguayan Football Association.)
Attendance: 30,681
Referee: Gustavo Tejera (Uruguay)

17 October 2023
18:30 UTC−5

Ecuador	0–0	Colombia
	Report (FIFA); Report (CONMEBOL)

Estadio Rodrigo Paz Delgado, Quito
Attendance: 38,702
Referee: Facundo Tello (Argentina)

17 October 2023
21:00 UTC−3

Uruguay	2–0	Brazil
Núñez 42'; De la Cruz 77'	Report (FIFA); Report (CONMEBOL)

Estadio Centenario, Montevideo
Attendance: 52,477
Referee: Alexis Herrera (Venezuela)

17 October 2023
21:00 UTC−5

Peru	0–2	Argentina
	Report (FIFA); Report (CONMEBOL)	Messi 32', 42'

Estadio Nacional, Lima
Attendance: 37,675
Referee: Jesús Valenzuela (Venezuela)

=== Matchday 5 ===
16 November 2023
16:00 UTC−4

Bolivia	2–0	Peru
H. Vaca 20'; R. Vaca 87'	Report (FIFA); Report (CONMEBOL)

Estadio Hernando Siles, La Paz
Attendance: 28,000
Referee: Guillermo Guerrero (Ecuador)

16 November 2023
18:00 UTC−4

Venezuela	0–0	Ecuador
	Report (FIFA); Report (CONMEBOL)

Estadio Monumental, Maturín
Attendance: 51,083
Referee: Juan Gabriel Benítez (Paraguay)

16 November 2023
19:00 UTC−5

Colombia	2–1	Brazil
Díaz 75', 79'	Report (FIFA); Report (CONMEBOL)	Martinelli 4'

Estadio Metropolitano Roberto Meléndez, Barranquilla
Attendance: 44,604
Referee: Andrés Matonte (Uruguay)

16 November 2023
21:00 UTC−3

Argentina	0–2	Uruguay
	Report (FIFA); Report (CONMEBOL)	R. Araújo 41'; Núñez 87'

La Bombonera, Buenos Aires
Attendance: 49,000
Referee: Wilmar Roldán (Colombia)

16 November 2023
21:30 UTC−3

Chile	0–0	Paraguay
	Report (FIFA); Report (CONMEBOL)

Estadio Monumental David Arellano, Santiago
Attendance: 30,076
Referee: Fernando Rapallini (Argentina)

=== Matchday 6 ===
21 November 2023
20:00 UTC−3

Paraguay	0–1	Colombia
	Report (FIFA); Report (CONMEBOL)	Borré 11' (pen.)

Estadio Defensores del Chaco, Asunción
Attendance: 25,298
Referee: Jesús Valenzuela (Venezuela)

21 November 2023
20:30 UTC−3

Uruguay	3–0	Bolivia
Núñez 15', 71'; Villamíl 39' (o.g.)	Report (FIFA); Report (CONMEBOL)

Estadio Centenario, Montevideo
Attendance: 46,100
Referee: Kevin Ortega (Peru)

21 November 2023
18:30 UTC−5

Ecuador	1–0	Chile
Mena 21'	Report (FIFA); Report (CONMEBOL)

Estadio Rodrigo Paz Delgado, Quito
Attendance: 36,873
Referee: Anderson Daronco (Brazil)

21 November 2023
21:30 UTC−3

Brazil	0–1	Argentina
	Report (FIFA); Report (CONMEBOL)	Otamendi 63'

Estádio do Maracanã, Rio de Janeiro
Attendance: 68,138
Referee: Piero Maza (Chile)

21 November 2023
21:00 UTC−5

Peru	1–1	Venezuela
Yotún 17'	Report (FIFA); Report (CONMEBOL)	Savarino 54'

Estadio Nacional, Lima
Attendance: 27,323
Referee: Darío Herrera (Argentina)

=== Matchday 7 ===
5 September 2024
16:00 UTC−4

Bolivia	4–0	Venezuela
R. Vaca 13'; Algarañaz 45+5' (pen.); Terceros 46'; Monteiro 89'	Report (FIFA); Report (CONMEBOL)

Estadio Municipal de El Alto, El Alto
Attendance: 20,500
Referee: Wilmar Roldán (Colombia)

5 September 2024
21:00 UTC−3

Argentina	3–0	Chile
Mac Allister 48'; Alvarez 84'; Dybala 90+1'	Report (FIFA); Report (CONMEBOL)

Estadio Monumental, Buenos Aires
Attendance: 52,160
Referee: Jesús Valenzuela (Venezuela)

6 September 2024
20:30 UTC−3

Uruguay	0–0	Paraguay
	Report (FIFA); Report (CONMEBOL)

Estadio Centenario, Montevideo
Attendance: 47,741
Referee: Darío Herrera (Argentina)

6 September 2024
22:00 UTC−3 (Note: The Brazil v Ecuador match, originally scheduled at 21:45 local time, was rescheduled to 22:00 local time.)

Brazil	1–0	Ecuador
Rodrygo 30'	Report (FIFA); Report (CONMEBOL)

Estádio Couto Pereira, Curitiba
Attendance: 36,914
Referee: Facundo Tello (Argentina)

6 September 2024
20:30 UTC−5

Peru	1–1	Colombia
Callens 68'	Report (FIFA); Report (CONMEBOL)	Díaz 82'

Estadio Nacional, Lima (Note: The Peru v Colombia match, originally scheduled to be played at Estadio Monumental, Lima, was relocated to Estadio Nacional, Lima due to the possibility that the pitch at the Estadio Monumental would not be fit for the date of the match.)
Attendance: 40,000
Referee: Esteban Ostojich (Uruguay)

=== Matchday 8 ===
10 September 2024
15:30 UTC−5

Colombia	2–1	Argentina
Mosquera 25'; Rodríguez 60' (pen.)	Report (FIFA); Report (CONMEBOL)	González 48'

Estadio Metropolitano Roberto Meléndez, Barranquilla
Attendance: 45,000
Referee: Piero Maza (Chile)

10 September 2024
18:00 UTC−3 (Note: The Chile v Bolivia match, originally scheduled at 21:00 local time, was rescheduled to 18:00 local time.)

Chile	1–2	Bolivia
Vargas 39'	Report (FIFA); Report (CONMEBOL)	Algarañaz 13'; Terceros 45+1'

Estadio Nacional Julio Martínez Prádanos, Santiago
Attendance: 40,000
Referee: Juan Gabriel Benítez (Paraguay)

10 September 2024
16:00 UTC−5

Ecuador	1–0	Peru
Valencia 54'	Report (FIFA); Report (CONMEBOL)

Estadio Rodrigo Paz Delgado, Quito
Attendance: 35,000
Referee: Andrés Rojas (Colombia)

10 September 2024
18:00 UTC−4

Venezuela	0–0	Uruguay
	Report (FIFA); Report (CONMEBOL)

Estadio Monumental, Maturín
Attendance: 50,000
Referee: Raphael Claus (Brazil)

10 September 2024
20:30 UTC−4 (Note: The Paraguay v Brazil match, originally scheduled at 20:00 local time, was rescheduled to 20:30 local time.)

Paraguay	1–0	Brazil
Gómez 20'	Report (FIFA); Report (CONMEBOL)

Estadio Defensores del Chaco, Asunción
Attendance: 31,962
Referee: Andrés Matonte (Uruguay)

=== Matchday 9 ===
10 October 2024
16:00 UTC−4

Bolivia	1–0	Colombia
Terceros 58'	Report (FIFA); Report (CONMEBOL)

Estadio Municipal de El Alto, El Alto
Attendance: 17,191
Referee: Wilton Sampaio (Brazil)

10 October 2024
16:00 UTC−5

Ecuador	0–0	Paraguay
	Report (FIFA); Report (CONMEBOL)

Estadio Rodrigo Paz Delgado, Quito
Attendance: 31,000
Referee: Raphael Claus (Brazil)

10 October 2024
17:00 UTC−4

Venezuela	1–1	Argentina
Rondón 65'	Report (FIFA); Report (CONMEBOL)	Otamendi 13'

Estadio Monumental, Maturín
Attendance: 50,000
Referee: Gustavo Tejera (Uruguay)

10 October 2024
21:00 UTC−3

Chile	1–2	Brazil
Vargas 2'	Report (FIFA); Report (CONMEBOL)	Igor Jesus 45+1'; Luiz Henrique 89'

Estadio Nacional Julio Martínez Prádanos, Santiago
Attendance: 43,059
Referee: Darío Herrera (Argentina)

11 October 2024
20:30 UTC−5

Peru	1–0	Uruguay
Araujo 88'	Report (FIFA); Report (CONMEBOL)

Estadio Nacional, Lima
Attendance: 43,000
Referee: Facundo Tello (Argentina)

=== Matchday 10 ===
15 October 2024
15:30 UTC−5

Colombia	4–0	Chile
Sánchez 34'; Díaz 52'; Durán 84'; Sinisterra 90+3'	Report (FIFA); Report (CONMEBOL)

Estadio Metropolitano Roberto Meléndez, Barranquilla
Attendance: 45,000
Referee: Jesús Valenzuela (Venezuela)

15 October 2024
20:00 UTC−3

Paraguay	2–1	Venezuela
Sanabria 59', 74'	Report (FIFA); Report (CONMEBOL)	Aramburu 25'

Estadio Defensores del Chaco, Asunción
Attendance: 28,531
Referee: Piero Maza (Chile)

15 October 2024
20:30 UTC−3

Uruguay	0–0	Ecuador
	Report (FIFA); Report (CONMEBOL)

Estadio Centenario, Montevideo
Attendance: 27,112
Referee: Cristián Garay (Chile)

15 October 2024
21:00 UTC−3

Argentina	6–0	Bolivia
Messi 19', 84', 86'; La. Martínez 43'; Alvarez 45+3'; Almada 69'	Report (FIFA); Report (CONMEBOL)

Estadio Monumental, Buenos Aires
Attendance: 60,000
Referee: Kevin Ortega (Peru)

15 October 2024
21:45 UTC−3

Brazil	4–0	Peru
Raphinha 38' (pen.), 54' (pen.); Pereira 71'; Luiz Henrique 74'	Report (FIFA); Report (CONMEBOL)

Estádio Nacional Mané Garrincha, Brasília
Attendance: 60,139
Referee: Esteban Ostojich (Uruguay)

=== Matchday 11 ===
14 November 2024
17:00 UTC−4

Venezuela	1–1	Brazil
Segovia 46'	Report (FIFA); Report (CONMEBOL)	Raphinha 43'

Estadio Monumental, Maturín
Attendance: 40,223
Referee: Andrés Rojas (Colombia)

14 November 2024
20:30 UTC−3

Paraguay	2–1	Argentina
Sanabria 19'; Alderete 47'	Report (FIFA); Report (CONMEBOL)	La. Martínez 11'

Estadio Defensores del Chaco, Asunción
Attendance: 32,200
Referee: Anderson Daronco (Brazil)

14 November 2024
19:00 UTC−5

Ecuador	4–0	Bolivia
Valencia 26' (pen.); Plata 28', 49'; Minda 61'	Report (FIFA); Report (CONMEBOL)

Estadio Monumental Isidro Romero Carbo, Guayaquil
Attendance: 30,758
Referee: Maximiliano Ramírez (Argentina)

15 November 2024
21:00 UTC−3

Uruguay	3–2	Colombia
Sánchez 57' (o.g.); Aguirre 60'; Ugarte 90+13'	Report (FIFA); Report (CONMEBOL)	Quintero 31'; A. Gómez 90+6'

Estadio Centenario, Montevideo
Attendance: 33,400
Referee: Kevin Ortega (Peru)

15 November 2024
20:30 UTC−5

Peru	0–0	Chile
	Report (FIFA); Report (CONMEBOL)

Estadio Monumental, Lima (Note: The Peru v Chile match, originally scheduled to be played at Estadio Nacional, Lima, was relocated to Estadio Monumental, Lima due to security reasons concerning the APEC Peru 2024 meeting.)
Attendance: 47,122
Referee: Wilton Sampaio (Brazil)

=== Matchday 12 ===
19 November 2024
16:00 UTC−4

Bolivia	2–2	Paraguay
E. Vaca 15'; Terceros 80' (pen.)	Report (FIFA); Report (CONMEBOL)	Almirón 71'; Enciso 90+1'

Estadio Municipal de El Alto, El Alto
Attendance: 18,655
Referee: Andrés Matonte (Uruguay)

19 November 2024
18:00 UTC−5

Colombia	0–1	Ecuador
	Report (FIFA); Report (CONMEBOL)	Valencia 7'

Estadio Metropolitano Roberto Meléndez, Barranquilla
Attendance: 37,316
Referee: Esteban Ostojich (Uruguay)

19 November 2024
21:00 UTC−3

Argentina	1–0	Peru
La. Martínez 55'	Report (FIFA); Report (CONMEBOL)

La Bombonera, Buenos Aires (Note: The Argentina v Peru match, originally scheduled to be played at Estadio Monumental, Buenos Aires, was relocated to La Bombonera, Buenos Aires due to the Estadio Monumental, which had previously been chosen to host the 2024 Copa Libertadores final, had to be reserved by CONMEBOL for preparations 15 days before the match.)
Attendance: 52,000
Referee: Wilmar Roldán (Colombia)

19 November 2024
21:00 UTC−3

Chile	4–2	Venezuela
Vargas 20'; Rincón 29' (o.g.); Cepeda 38', 47'	Report (FIFA); Report (CONMEBOL)	Savarino 13'; R. Ramírez 22'

Estadio Nacional Julio Martínez Prádanos, Santiago
Attendance: 31,906
Referee: Facundo Tello (Argentina)

19 November 2024
21:45 UTC−3

Brazil	1–1	Uruguay
Gerson 62'	Report (FIFA); Report (CONMEBOL)	Valverde 55'

Arena Fonte Nova, Salvador
Attendance: 41,511
Referee: Piero Maza (Chile)

=== Matchday 13 ===
20 March 2025
20:00 UTC−3

Paraguay	1–0	Chile
Alderete 60'	Report (FIFA); Report (CONMEBOL)

Estadio Defensores del Chaco, Asunción
Attendance: 31,193
Referee: Raphael Claus (Brazil)

20 March 2025
21:45 UTC−3

Brazil	2–1	Colombia
Raphinha 6' (pen.); Vinícius 90+9'	Report (FIFA); Report (CONMEBOL)	Díaz 41'

Estádio Nacional Mané Garrincha, Brasília
Attendance: 70,027
Referee: Alexis Herrera (Venezuela)

20 March 2025
20:30 UTC−5

Peru	3–1	Bolivia
Polo 37'; Guerrero 45'; Flores 82'	Report (FIFA); Report (CONMEBOL)	Terceros 58' (pen.)

Estadio Nacional, Lima
Attendance: 33,683
Referee: Yael Falcón (Argentina)

21 March 2025
16:00 UTC−5

Ecuador	2–1	Venezuela
Valencia 39', 46'	Report (FIFA); Report (CONMEBOL)	Cádiz 90+1'

Estadio Rodrigo Paz Delgado, Quito
Attendance: 41,575
Referee: Ramon Abatti (Brazil)

21 March 2025
20:30 UTC−3

Uruguay	0–1	Argentina
	Report (FIFA); Report (CONMEBOL)	Almada 68'

Estadio Centenario, Montevideo
Attendance: 55,000
Referee: Juan Gabriel Benítez (Paraguay)

=== Matchday 14 ===
25 March 2025
16:00 UTC−4

Bolivia	0–0	Uruguay
	Report (FIFA); Report (CONMEBOL)

Estadio Municipal de El Alto, El Alto
Attendance: 10,723
Referee: Augusto Aragón (Ecuador)

25 March 2025
19:00 UTC−5

Colombia	2–2	Paraguay
Díaz 1'; Durán 13'	Report (FIFA); Report (CONMEBOL)	Alonso 45+4'; Enciso 62'

Estadio Metropolitano Roberto Meléndez, Barranquilla
Attendance: 42,262
Referee: Facundo Tello (Argentina)

25 March 2025
20:00 UTC−4

Venezuela	1–0	Peru
Rondón 41' (pen.)	Report (FIFA); Report (CONMEBOL)

Estadio Monumental, Maturín
Attendance: 33,683
Referee: Cristián Garay (Chile)

25 March 2025
21:00 UTC−3

Argentina	4–1	Brazil
Alvarez 4'; Fernández 12'; Mac Allister 37'; Simeone 71'	Report (FIFA); Report (CONMEBOL)	Cunha 26'

Estadio Monumental, Buenos Aires
Attendance: 85,015
Referee: Andrés Rojas (Colombia)

25 March 2025
21:00 UTC−3

Chile	0–0	Ecuador
	Report (FIFA); Report (CONMEBOL)

Estadio Nacional Julio Martínez Prádanos, Santiago
Attendance: 38,996
Referee: Gustavo Tejera (Uruguay)

=== Matchday 15 ===
5 June 2025
20:00 UTC−3

Paraguay	2–0	Uruguay
Galarza 13'; Enciso 81' (pen.)	Report (FIFA); Report (CONMEBOL)

Estadio Defensores del Chaco, Asunción
Attendance: 30,005
Referee: Darío Herrera (Argentina)

5 June 2025
18:00 UTC−5

Ecuador	0–0	Brazil
	Report (FIFA); Report (CONMEBOL)

Estadio Monumental Isidro Romero Carbo, Guayaquil
Attendance: 59,283
Referee: Piero Maza (Chile)

5 June 2025
21:00 UTC−4

Chile	0–1	Argentina
	Report (FIFA); Report (CONMEBOL)	Alvarez 16'

Estadio Nacional Julio Martínez Prádanos, Santiago
Attendance: 45,000
Referee: Jesús Valenzuela (Venezuela)

6 June 2025
15:30 UTC−5

Colombia	0–0	Peru
	Report (FIFA); Report (CONMEBOL)

Estadio Metropolitano Roberto Meléndez, Barranquilla
Attendance: 43,933
Referee: Wilton Sampaio (Brazil)

6 June 2025
18:00 UTC−4

Venezuela	2–0	Bolivia
Cuéllar 5' (o.g.); Rondón 30'	Report (FIFA); Report (CONMEBOL)

Estadio Monumental, Maturín
Attendance: 46,741
Referee: Yael Falcón (Argentina)

=== Matchday 16 ===
10 June 2025
16:00 UTC−4

Bolivia	2–0	Chile
Terceros 5'; Monteiro 90'	Report (FIFA); Report (CONMEBOL)

Estadio Municipal de El Alto, El Alto
Attendance: 11,467
Referee: Esteban Ostojich (Uruguay)

10 June 2025
20:00 UTC−3

Uruguay	2–0	Venezuela
Aguirre 43'; De Arrascaeta 47'	Report (FIFA); Report (CONMEBOL)

Estadio Centenario, Montevideo
Attendance: 29,672
Referee: Raphael Claus (Brazil)

10 June 2025
21:00 UTC−3

Argentina	1–1	Colombia
Almada 81'	Report (FIFA); Report (CONMEBOL)	Díaz 24'

Estadio Monumental, Buenos Aires
Attendance: 77,791
Referee: Juan Gabriel Benítez (Paraguay)

10 June 2025
21:45 UTC−3

Brazil	1–0	Paraguay
Vinícius 44'	Report (FIFA); Report (CONMEBOL)

Arena Corinthians, São Paulo
Attendance: 43,316
Referee: Facundo Tello (Argentina)

10 June 2025
20:30 UTC−5

Peru	0–0	Ecuador
	Report (FIFA); Report (CONMEBOL)

Estadio Nacional, Lima
Attendance: 33,749
Referee: Andrés Rojas (Colombia)

=== Matchday 17 ===
4 September 2025
20:30 UTC−3

Uruguay	3–0	Peru
Aguirre 14'; De Arrascaeta 58'; Viñas 80'	Report (FIFA); Report (CONMEBOL)

Estadio Centenario, Montevideo
Referee: Facundo Tello (Argentina)

4 September 2025
18:30 UTC−5

Colombia	3–0	Bolivia
J. Rodríguez 31'; Córdoba 74'; Quintero 83'	Report (FIFA); Report (CONMEBOL)

Estadio Metropolitano Roberto Meléndez, Barranquilla
Referee: Darío Herrera (Argentina)

4 September 2025
20:30 UTC−3

Paraguay	0–0	Ecuador
	Report (FIFA); Report (CONMEBOL)

Estadio Defensores del Chaco, Asunción
Referee: Raphael Claus (Brazil)

4 September 2025
20:30 UTC−3

Argentina	3–0	Venezuela
Messi 39', 80'; La. Martínez 76'	Report (FIFA); Report (CONMEBOL)

Estadio Monumental, Buenos Aires
Attendance: 76,490
Referee: Piero Maza (Chile)

4 September 2025
21:30 UTC−3

Brazil	3–0	Chile
Estêvão 38'; Paquetá 72'; Bruno Guimarães 76'	Report (FIFA); Report (CONMEBOL)

Estádio do Maracanã, Rio de Janeiro
Attendance: 57,326
Referee: Alexis Herrera (Venezuela)

=== Matchday 18 ===
9 September 2025
18:00 UTC−5

Ecuador	1–0	Argentina
Valencia 45+13' (pen.)	Report (FIFA); Report (CONMEBOL)

Estadio Monumental Isidro Romero Carbo, Guayaquil
Referee: Wilmar Roldán (Colombia)

9 September 2025
18:30 UTC−5

Peru	0–1	Paraguay
	Report (FIFA); Report (CONMEBOL)	Galarza 78'

Estadio Nacional, Lima
Referee: Maximiliano Ramírez (Argentina)

9 September 2025
19:30 UTC−4

Venezuela	3–6	Colombia
Segovia 3'; J. Martínez 12'; Rondón 76'	Report (FIFA); Report (CONMEBOL)	Mina 10'; Suárez 42', 50', 59', 67'; Córdoba 78'

Estadio Monumental, Maturín
Referee: Wilton Sampaio (Brazil)

9 September 2025
19:30 UTC−4

Bolivia	1–0	Brazil
Terceros 45+4' (pen.)	Report (FIFA); Report (CONMEBOL)

Estadio Municipal de El Alto, El Alto
Referee: Cristián Garay (Chile)

9 September 2025
20:30 UTC−3

Chile	0–0	Uruguay
	Report (FIFA); Report (CONMEBOL)

Estadio Nacional Julio Martínez Prádanos, Santiago
Referee: Anderson Daronco (Brazil)

== Inter-confederation play-offs ==
The seventh-place team, Bolivia, joined DR Congo (from CAF), Iraq (from AFC), Jamaica and Suriname (both from CONCACAF), and New Caledonia (from OFC) in the inter-confederation play-offs.

The teams were ranked according to the November 2025 FIFA Men's World Ranking, with the four lowest-ranked teams playing in two single-elimination matches. The winners met the two highest-ranked teams in another set of single-elimination matches, with the winners of these matches qualifying for the 2026 FIFA World Cup.

Semi-final
26 March 2026 – Guadalupe
Bolivia	2
Suriname	1

Final
31 March 2026 – Guadalupe
Iraq	2
Bolivia	1

== Qualified teams ==
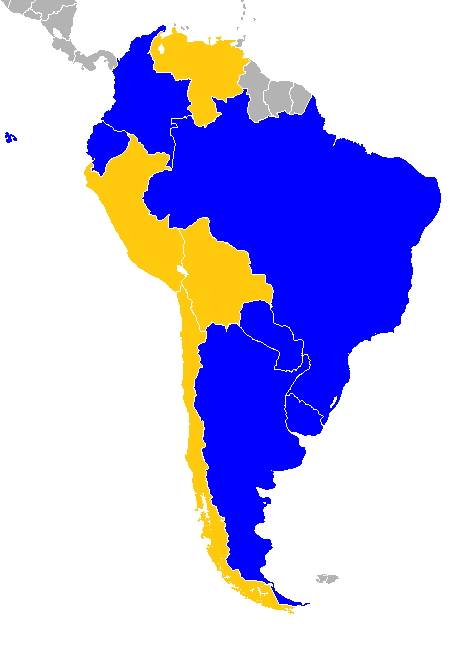
Qualified for the World Cup Failed to qualify Not a CONMEBOL member

The following teams from CONMEBOL qualified for the final tournament.

Team	Qualified as	Qualified on	Previous appearances in FIFA World Cup (Note: Bold indicates champions for that year. Italic indicates hosts for that year.)
Argentina	Winners	25 March 2025	18 (1930, 1934, 1958, 1962, 1966, 1974, **1978**, 1982, **1986**, 1990, 1994, 1998, 2002, 2006, 2010, 2014, 2018, **2022**)
Ecuador	Runners-up	10 June 2025	4 (2002, 2006, 2014, 2022)
Colombia	Third place	4 September 2025	6 (1962, 1990, 1994, 1998, 2014, 2018)
Uruguay	Fourth place	4 September 2025	14 (**1930**, **1950**, 1954, 1962, 1966, 1970, 1974, 1986, 1990, 2002, 2010, 2014, 2018, 2022)
Brazil	Fifth place	10 June 2025	22 (1930, 1934, 1938, 1950, 1954, **1958**, **1962**, 1966, **1970**, 1974, 1978, 1982, 1986, 1990, **1994**, 1998, **2002**, 2006, 2010, 2014, 2018, 2022)
Paraguay	Sixth place	4 September 2025	8 (1930, 1950, 1958, 1986, 1998, 2002, 2006, 2010)

== Goalscorers ==
There were 183 goals scored in 90 matches, for an average of 2.03 goals per match.

8 goals

- (Argentina) Lionel Messi

7 goals

- (Bolivia) Miguel Terceros
- (Colombia) Luis Díaz

6 goals

- (Ecuador) Enner Valencia
- (Venezuela) Salomón Rondón

5 goals

- (Brazil) Raphinha
- (Uruguay) Darwin Núñez

4 goals

- (Argentina) Julián Alvarez
- (Argentina) Lautaro Martínez
- (Colombia) Luis Suárez
- (Paraguay) Antonio Sanabria

3 goals

- (Argentina) Thiago Almada
- (Argentina) Nicolás Otamendi
- (Brazil) Rodrygo
- (Chile) Eduardo Vargas
- (Colombia) James Rodríguez
- (Paraguay) Julio Enciso
- (Uruguay) Rodrigo Aguirre
- (Uruguay) Nicolás de la Cruz

2 goals

- (Argentina) Enzo Fernández
- (Argentina) Nicolás González
- (Argentina) Alexis Mac Allister
- (Bolivia) Carmelo Algarañaz
- (Bolivia) Enzo Monteiro
- (Bolivia) Ramiro Vaca
- (Brazil) Luiz Henrique
- (Brazil) Neymar
- (Brazil) Vinícius Júnior
- (Chile) Lucas Cepeda
- (Colombia) Jhon Córdoba
- (Colombia) Jhon Durán
- (Colombia) Juan Fernando Quintero
- (Colombia) Rafael Santos Borré
- (Ecuador) Gonzalo Plata
- (Ecuador) Félix Torres
- (Paraguay) Omar Alderete
- (Paraguay) Matías Galarza
- (Uruguay) Giorgian de Arrascaeta
- (Uruguay) Federico Valverde
- (Venezuela) Jefferson Savarino
- (Venezuela) Telasco Segovia

1 goal

- (Argentina) Paulo Dybala
- (Argentina) Giuliano Simeone
- (Argentina) Nicolás Tagliafico
- (Bolivia) Víctor Ábrego
- (Bolivia) Rodrigo Ramallo
- (Bolivia) Ervin Vaca
- (Bolivia) Henry Vaca
- (Brazil) Matheus Cunha
- (Brazil) Estêvão
- (Brazil) Gerson
- (Brazil) Bruno Guimarães
- (Brazil) Igor Jesus
- (Brazil) Gabriel Magalhães
- (Brazil) Marquinhos
- (Brazil) Gabriel Martinelli
- (Brazil) Lucas Paquetá
- (Brazil) Andreas Pereira
- (Chile) Marcelino Núñez
- (Chile) Diego Valdés
- (Chile) Arturo Vidal
- (Colombia) Andrés Gómez
- (Colombia) Yerry Mina
- (Colombia) Yerson Mosquera
- (Colombia) Davinson Sánchez
- (Colombia) Luis Sinisterra
- (Colombia) Mateus Uribe
- (Ecuador) Ángel Mena
- (Ecuador) Alan Minda
- (Ecuador) Kendry Páez
- (Ecuador) Kevin Rodríguez
- (Paraguay) Miguel Almirón
- (Paraguay) Júnior Alonso
- (Paraguay) Diego Gómez
- (Peru) Miguel Araujo
- (Peru) Alexander Callens
- (Peru) Edison Flores
- (Peru) Paolo Guerrero
- (Peru) Andy Polo
- (Peru) Yoshimar Yotún
- (Uruguay) Ronald Araújo
- (Uruguay) Agustín Canobbio
- (Uruguay) Mathías Olivera
- (Uruguay) Manuel Ugarte
- (Uruguay) Federico Viñas
- (Venezuela) Jon Aramburu
- (Venezuela) Eduard Bello
- (Venezuela) Jhonder Cádiz
- (Venezuela) Darwin Machís
- (Venezuela) Josef Martínez
- (Venezuela) Yeferson Soteldo

1 own goal

- (Bolivia) Gabriel Villamil (against Uruguay)
- (Bolivia) Héctor Cuéllar (against Venezuela)
- (Colombia) Davinson Sánchez (against Uruguay)
- (Venezuela) Tomás Rincón (against Chile)

== Discipline ==
A player was automatically suspended for the next match for the following infractions:

- Receiving a red card (red card suspensions could be extended for serious infractions)
- Receiving two yellow cards in two different matches (yellow card suspensions were carried forward to further qualification rounds, but not the finals or any other future international matches)

The following suspensions were served during qualification:

Team	Player	Infraction(s)	Suspended for match(es)
Argentina	Enzo Fernández	(yellow card) vs Paraguay (12 October 2023); (yellow card) vs Brazil (25 March 2025)	vs Chile (5 June 2025)
Argentina	Enzo Fernández	(red card) vs Colombia (10 June 2025)	vs Venezuela (4 September 2025) vs Ecuador (9 September 2025)
Argentina	Nicolás González	(red card) vs Uruguay (21 March 2025)	vs Brazil (25 March 2025) vs Chile (5 June 2025)
Argentina	Emiliano Martínez	Post-match misconduct vs Chile (5 September 2024); Post-match misconduct vs Colombia (10 September 2024)	vs Venezuela (10 October 2024) vs Bolivia (15 October 2024)
Argentina	Nicolás Otamendi	(yellow card) vs Paraguay (14 November 2024); (yellow card) vs Brazil (25 March 2025)	vs Chile (5 June 2025)
Argentina	Leandro Paredes	(yellow card) vs Ecuador (7 September 2023); (yellow card) vs Brazil (25 March 2025)	vs Chile (5 June 2025)
Argentina	Cristian Romero	(yellow card) vs Uruguay (16 November 2023); (yellow card) vs Colombia (10 October 2024)	vs Venezuela (10 October 2024)
Argentina	Nicolás Tagliafico	(yellow card) vs Brazil (25 March 2025); (yellow card) vs Chile (5 June 2025)	vs Colombia (10 June 2025)
Bolivia	Carmelo Algarañaz	(yellow card) vs Argentina (12 September 2023); (yellow card) vs Argentina (15 October 2024)	vs Ecuador (14 November 2024)
Bolivia	Lucas Chávez	(yellow card) vs Ecuador (14 November 2024); (red card) vs Chile (10 June 2025)	vs Colombia (4 September 2025) vs Brazil (9 September 2025)
Bolivia	Héctor Cuéllar	(yellow card) vs Ecuador (12 October 2023); (yellow card) vs Venezuela (5 September 2024)	vs Chile (10 September 2024)
Bolivia	Héctor Cuéllar	(red card) vs Colombia (10 October 2024)	vs Argentina (15 October 2024)
Bolivia	Roberto Fernández	(red card) vs Argentina (12 September 2023)	vs Ecuador (12 October 2023) vs Paraguay (17 October 2023)
Bolivia	Luis Haquín	(yellow card) vs Paraguay (17 October 2023); (yellow card) vs Venezuela (6 June 2025)	vs Chile (10 June 2025)
Bolivia	José Sagredo	(red card) vs Ecuador (14 November 2024)	vs Paraguay (19 November 2024)
Bolivia	Adalid Terrazas	(red card) vs Paraguay (19 November 2024)	vs Peru (20 March 2025)
Bolivia	Ramiro Vaca	(yellow card) vs Uruguay (21 November 2023); (yellow card) vs Venezuela (5 September 2024)	vs Chile (10 September 2024)
Bolivia	Gabriel Villamil	(yellow card) vs Argentina (12 September 2023); (yellow card) vs Paraguay (17 October 2023)	vs Peru (16 November 2023)
Brazil	André	(yellow card) vs Venezuela (12 October 2023); (yellow card) vs Argentina (25 March 2025)	vs Ecuador (5 June 2025)
Brazil	Bruno Guimarães	(yellow card) vs Peru (12 September 2023); (yellow card) vs Colombia (20 March 2025)	vs Argentina (25 March 2025)
Brazil	Gabriel Jesus	(yellow card) vs Uruguay (17 October 2023); (yellow card) vs Argentina (21 November 2023)	vs Ecuador (6 September 2024)
Brazil	Gabriel Magalhães	(yellow card) vs Uruguay (19 November 2024); (yellow card) vs Colombia (20 March 2025)	vs Argentina (25 March 2025)
Brazil	Joelinton	(red card) vs Argentina (21 November 2023)	vs Ecuador (6 September 2024) vs Paraguay (10 September 2024)
Brazil	Lucas Paquetá	(yellow card) vs Paraguay (10 September 2024); (yellow card) vs Chile (10 October 2024)	vs Peru (15 October 2024)
Brazil	Raphinha	(yellow card) vs Peru (12 September 2023); (yellow card) vs Argentina (21 November 2023)	vs Ecuador (6 September 2024)
Brazil	Raphinha	(yellow card) vs Uruguay (19 November 2024); (yellow card) vs Argentina (25 March 2025)	vs Ecuador (5 June 2025)
Brazil	Vanderson	(yellow card) vs Peru (15 October 2024); (yellow card) vs Venezuela (14 November 2024)	vs Uruguay (19 November 2024)
Brazil	Vinícius Júnior	(yellow card) vs Paraguay (10 September 2024); (yellow card) vs Paraguay (10 June 2025)	vs Chile (4 September 2025)
Chile	Matías Catalán	(yellow card) vs Colombia (12 September 2023); (yellow card) vs Bolivia (10 September 2024)	vs Brazil (10 October 2024)
Chile	Víctor Dávila	(yellow card) vs Argentina (5 September 2024); (yellow card) vs Bolivia (10 June 2025)	vs Brazil (4 September 2025)
Chile	Paulo Díaz	(yellow card) vs Argentina (5 September 2024); (yellow card) vs Bolivia (10 September 2024)	vs Brazil (10 October 2024)
Chile	Felipe Loyola	(yellow card) vs Brazil (10 October 2024); (yellow card) vs Peru (15 November 2024)	vs Venezuela (19 November 2024)
Chile	Guillermo Maripán	(yellow card) vs Paraguay (16 November 2023); (yellow card) vs Argentina (5 June 2025)	vs Bolivia (10 June 2025)
Chile	Gary Medel	(yellow card) vs Uruguay (8 September 2023); (yellow card) vs Paraguay (16 November 2023)	vs Ecuador (21 November 2023)
Chile	Felipe Mendez	(red card) vs Paraguay (16 November 2023)	vs Ecuador (21 November 2023) vs Argentina (5 September 2024)
Chile	Marcelino Núñez	(yellow card) vs Uruguay (8 September 2023); (yellow card) (yellow-red card) vs Venezuela (17 October 2023)	vs Paraguay (16 November 2023)
Chile	Erick Pulgar	(yellow card) vs Uruguay (8 September 2023); (yellow card) vs Peru (12 October 2023)	vs Venezuela (17 October 2023)
Chile	Erick Pulgar	(yellow card) vs Ecuador (21 November 2023); (yellow card) vs Bolivia (10 September 2024)	vs Brazil (10 October 2024)
Chile	Francisco Sierralta	(red card) vs Bolivia (10 June 2025	vs Brazil (4 September 2025) vs Uruguay (9 September 2025)
Chile	Gabriel Suazo	(yellow card) vs Venezuela (17 October 2023); (yellow card) vs Bolivia (10 September 2024)	vs Brazil (10 October 2024)
Chile	Arturo Vidal	(yellow card) vs Venezuela (19 November 2024); (yellow card) vs Argentina (5 June 2025)	vs Bolivia (10 June 2025)
Colombia	Jhon Arias	(yellow card) vs Chile (12 September 2023); (yellow card) vs Ecuador (17 October 2023)	vs Brazil (16 November 2023)
Colombia	Kevin Castaño	(yellow card) vs Bolivia (10 October 2024); (yellow card) vs Argentina (10 June 2025)	vs Bolivia (4 September 2025)
Colombia	Jhon Córdoba	(yellow card) vs Paraguay (21 November 2023); (yellow card) vs Chile (15 October 2024)	vs Uruguay (15 November 2024)
Colombia	Luis Díaz	(yellow card) vs Chile (12 September 2023); (yellow card) vs Paraguay (25 March 2025)	vs Peru (6 June 2025)
Colombia	Jhon Durán	(yellow card) vs Chile (12 September 2023); (yellow card) vs Argentina (10 September 2024)	vs Bolivia (10 October 2024)
Colombia	Jhon Durán	(yellow card) vs Uruguay (15 November 2024); (yellow card) vs Ecuador (19 November 2024)	vs Brazil (20 March 2025)
Colombia	Yerry Mina	(yellow card) vs Paraguay (21 November 2023); (yellow card) vs Peru (6 September 2024)	vs Argentina (10 September 2024)
Colombia	Daniel Muñoz	(yellow card) vs Paraguay (21 November 2023); (yellow card) vs Argentina (10 June 2025)	vs Bolivia (4 September 2025)
Colombia	Davinson Sánchez	(yellow card) vs Ecuador (17 October 2023); (yellow card) vs Brazil (16 November 2023)	vs Paraguay (21 November 2023)
Colombia	Camilo Vargas	(yellow card) (yellow-red card) vs Uruguay (12 October 2023)	vs Ecuador (17 October 2023)
Ecuador	Moisés Caicedo	(yellow card) vs Paraguay (10 October 2024); (yellow card) vs Uruguay (15 October 2024)	vs Bolivia (14 November 2024)
Ecuador	José Cifuentes	(yellow card) vs Argentina (7 September 2023); (yellow card) vs Venezuela (16 November 2023)	vs Chile (21 November 2023)
Ecuador	Alan Franco	(yellow card) vs Venezuela (16 November 2023); (yellow card) (yellow-red card) vs Peru (10 June 2025)	vs Paraguay (4 September 2025)
Ecuador	Carlos Gruezo	(yellow card) vs Colombia (17 October 2023); (yellow card) vs Colombia (19 November 2024)	vs Venezuela (21 March 2025)
Ecuador	Piero Hincapié	(yellow card) vs Colombia (17 October 2023); (yellow card) vs Venezuela (16 November 2023)	vs Chile (21 November 2023)
Ecuador	Piero Hincapié	(red card) vs Colombia (19 November 2024)	vs Venezuela (21 March 2025)
Ecuador	Ángelo Preciado	(yellow card) vs Uruguay (12 September 2023); (yellow card) vs Chile (21 November 2023)	vs Brazil (6 September 2024)
Paraguay	Omar Alderete	(yellow card) vs Venezuela (15 October 2024); (yellow card) vs Argentina (14 November 2024)	vs Bolivia (19 November 2024)
Paraguay	Júnior Alonso	(yellow card) vs Argentina (12 October 2023); (yellow card) vs Brazil (10 September 2024)	vs Ecuador (10 October 2024)
Paraguay	Adam Bareiro	(yellow card) vs Argentina (12 October 2023); (yellow card) vs Bolivia (17 October 2023)	vs Chile (16 November 2023)
Paraguay	Hernesto Caballero	(yellow card) vs Chile (16 November 2023); (yellow card) vs Colombia (21 November 2023)	vs Uruguay (6 September 2024)
Paraguay	Juan Cáceres	(yellow card) vs Colombia (21 November 2023); (yellow card) vs Venezuela (15 October 2024)	vs Argentina (14 November 2024)
Paraguay	Andrés Cubas	(yellow card) vs Uruguay (6 September 2024); (yellow card) vs Argentina (14 November 2024)	vs Bolivia (19 November 2024)
Paraguay	Matías Galarza	(yellow card) vs Colombia (25 March 2025); (yellow card) vs Uruguay (5 June 2025)	vs Brazil (10 June 2025)
Paraguay	Diego Gómez	(yellow card) vs Chile (16 November 2023); (yellow card) vs Brazil (10 September 2024)	vs Ecuador (10 October 2024)
Paraguay	Diego Gómez	(red card) vs Bolivia (19 November 2024)	vs Chile (20 March 2025)
Paraguay	Gustavo Gómez	(yellow card) vs Venezuela (12 September 2023); (yellow card) vs Uruguay (6 September 2024)	vs Brazil (10 September 2024)
Paraguay	Robert Rojas	(red card) vs Chile (16 November 2023)	vs Colombia (21 November 2023) vs Uruguay (6 September 2024)
Peru	Luis Advíncula	(yellow card) (yellow-red card) vs Paraguay (7 September 2023)	vs Brazil (12 September 2023)
Peru	Luis Advíncula	(yellow card) vs Argentina (17 October 2023); (yellow card) vs Bolivia (16 November 2023)	vs Venezuela (21 November 2023)
Peru	Miguel Araujo	(yellow card) vs Paraguay (7 September 2023); (yellow card) vs Argentina (19 November 2024)	vs Bolivia (20 March 2025)
Peru	Wilder Cartagena	(yellow card) vs Brazil (12 September 2023); (yellow card) vs Ecuador (10 September 2024)	vs Uruguay (11 October 2024)
Peru	Wilder Cartagena	(yellow card) vs Brazil (15 October 2024); (yellow card) vs Chile (15 November 2024)	vs Argentina (19 November 2024)
Peru	Pedro Gallese	(yellow card) vs Bolivia (16 November 2023); (yellow card) vs Brazil (15 October 2024)	vs Chile (15 November 2024)
Peru	Bryan Reyna	(yellow card) vs Bolivia (16 November 2023); (yellow card) vs Brazil (15 October 2024)	vs Chile (15 November 2024)
Peru	Renato Tapia	(yellow card) vs Brazil (12 September 2023); (yellow card) vs Ecuador (10 June 2025)	vs Uruguay (4 September 2025)
Peru	Yoshimar Yotún	(yellow card) vs Argentina (17 October 2023); (yellow card) vs Venezuela (21 November 2023)	vs Colombia (6 September 2024)
Peru	Marcos López	(yellow card) vs Brazil (12 September 2023); (yellow card) vs Chile (12 October 2023)	vs Argentina (17 October 2023)
Peru	Marcos López	(yellow card) vs Venezuela (21 November 2023); (yellow card) vs Ecuador (10 September 2024)	vs Uruguay (11 October 2024)
Peru	Marcos López	Damaging VAR equipment vs Brazil (15 October 2024)	vs Chile (15 November 2024)
Peru	Carlos Zambrano	Offensive behavior vs Brazil (15 October 2024)	vs Chile (15 November 2024)
Peru	Carlos Zambrano	(yellow card) vs Brazil (15 October 2024); (yellow card) vs Argentina (19 November 2024)	vs Bolivia (20 March 2025)
Uruguay	Ronald Araújo	(yellow card) vs Brazil (17 October 2023); (yellow card) vs Venezuela (10 June 2025)	vs Peru (4 September 2025)
Uruguay	Rodrigo Bentancur	(yellow card) vs Colombia (15 November 2024); (yellow card) vs Bolivia (25 March 2025)	vs Paraguay (5 June 2025)
Uruguay	Nahitan Nández	(yellow card) vs Brazil (17 October 2023); (yellow card) vs Paraguay (6 September 2024)	vs Venezuela (10 September 2024)
Uruguay	Nahitan Nández	(yellow card) vs Peru (11 October 2024); (yellow card) vs Colombia (15 November 2024)	vs Brazil (19 November 2024)
Uruguay	Nahitan Nández	(yellow card) vs Argentina (21 March 2025); (yellow card) vs Venezuela (10 June 2025)	vs Peru (4 September 2025)
Uruguay	Mathías Olivera	(yellow card) vs Ecuador (12 September 2023); (yellow card) vs Argentina (16 November 2023)	vs Bolivia (21 November 2023)
Uruguay	Manuel Ugarte	(yellow card) vs Chile (8 September 2023); (yellow card) vs Argentina (16 November 2023)	vs Bolivia (21 November 2023)
Uruguay	Manuel Ugarte	(yellow card) vs Venezuela (10 September 2024); (yellow card) vs Brazil (19 November 2024)	vs Argentina (21 March 2025)
Uruguay	Federico Valverde	(yellow card) vs Chile (8 September 2023); (yellow card) vs Paraguay (6 September 2024)	vs Venezuela (10 September 2024)
Uruguay	Matías Viña	(yellow card) vs Chile (8 September 2023); (yellow card) vs Ecuador (12 September 2023)	vs Colombia (12 October 2023)
Venezuela	Wilker Ángel	(yellow card) vs Ecuador (16 November 2023); (yellow card) vs Chile (19 November 2024)	vs Ecuador (21 March 2025)
Venezuela	Jon Aramburu	(yellow card) vs Paraguay (15 October 2024); (yellow card) vs Chile (19 November 2024)	vs Ecuador (21 March 2025)
Venezuela	Cristian Cásseres	(yellow card) vs Bolivia (5 September 2024); (yellow card) vs Uruguay (10 September 2024)	vs Argentina (10 October 2024)
Venezuela	Cristian Cásseres	(yellow card) vs Paraguay (15 October 2024); (yellow card) vs Brazil (14 November 2024)	vs Chile (19 November 2024)
Venezuela	Alexander González	(yellow card) vs Colombia (7 September 2023); (red card) vs Brazil (14 November 2024)	vs Chile (19 November 2024)
Venezuela	Yangel Herrera	(yellow card) vs Brazil (12 October 2023); (yellow card) vs Peru (25 March 2025)	vs Bolivia (6 June 2025)
Venezuela	José Martínez	(yellow card) vs Paraguay (12 September 2023); (yellow card) vs Ecuador (16 November 2023)	vs Peru (21 November 2023)
Venezuela	José Martínez	(yellow card) vs Uruguay (10 September 2024); (yellow card) vs Argentina (10 October 2024)	vs Paraguay (15 October 2024)
Venezuela	José Martínez	(yellow card) vs Chile (19 November 2024); (yellow card) vs Uruguay (10 June 2025)	vs Argentina (4 September 2025)
Venezuela	Miguel Navarro	(yellow card) vs Paraguay (12 September 2023); (yellow card) vs Uruguay (10 September 2024)	vs Argentina (10 October 2024)
Venezuela	Telasco Segovia	(yellow card) vs Brazil (14 November 2024); (yellow card) vs Uruguay (10 June 2025)	vs Argentina (4 September 2025)
Venezuela	Yeferson Soteldo	(yellow card) vs Bolivia (5 September 2024); (yellow card) vs Paraguay (15 October 2024)	vs Brazil (14 November 2024)
