= Carmelo Algarañaz =

Bolivian footballer (born 1996)

Personal information
- Full name: Carmelo Algarañaz Añez
- Date of birth: 27 January 1996 (age 30)
- Place of birth: Santa Ana del Yacuma, Bolivia
- Height: 1.78 m (5 ft 10 in)
- Position: Striker

Team information
- Current team: Always Ready
- Number: 24

Youth career
- 2014: Club Calleja
- 2015: Oriente Petrolero

Senior career*
Years	Team	Apps	(Gls)
2015–2020	Oriente Petrolero	61	(14)
2020–2021	Always Ready	55	(33)
2021–2022	Ismaily	2	(0)
2022	Always Ready	21	(3)
2023–2024	Bolívar	39	(16)
2024–2026	Kalamata	16	(1)
2026	The Strongest	7	(1)
2026	Kalamata	0	(0)
2026–	Always Ready	11	(2)

International career^{‡}
2015	Bolivia U20	2	(0)
2016–	Bolivia	38	(4)
- * Club domestic league appearances and goals as of 19:27, 4 May 2025 (UTC) ‡ National team caps and goals as of 22:03, 10 October 2025 (UTC)

Carmelo Algarañaz Añez (born 27 January 1996) is a Bolivian professional footballer who plays as a striker for FBF División Profesional club Always Ready.

He made his full debut for Bolivia on 29 May 2016, against the USA.

== Career ==
=== Club ===
Algarañaz started his career as a footballer in the Bolivian top-flight with Club Calleja in 2014, before departing for Oriente Petrolero in the same league by the start of 2015. He played for Club Always Ready where in 2021 he played in 26 games and scored 17 goals, placing him near the top of the Bolivian scoring charts. He signed for Ismaily in December 2021.

He joined Greek side Kalamata F.C. in 2024, and scored his first league goal for the club against Panargiakos F.C. in September 2024.

=== International ===
He scored his first international goal for the senior Bolivia team in March 2023 against Saudi Arabia. In March 2024, he scored for Bolivia against Algeria in the 2024 FIFA Series.

== Career statistics ==
=== Club ===
As of match played 4 May 2025

Appearances and goals by club, season and competition
Club	Season	League			National cup		League Cup		Continental		Other		Total	
Club	Season	Division	Apps	Goals	Apps	Goals	Apps	Goals	Apps	Goals	Apps	Goals	Apps	Goals
Oriente Petrolero	2014–15	Bolivian Primera División	2	0	—		—		—		—		2	0
Oriente Petrolero	2015–16	Bolivian Primera División	21	6	0	0	—		1 (Note: Appearance(s) in Copa Sudamericana)	0	—		22	6
Oriente Petrolero	2016–17	Bolivian Primera División	33	7	0	0	—		1	0	—		34	7
Oriente Petrolero	2020	Bolivian Primera División	5	1	0	0	—		0	0	—		5	1
Oriente Petrolero	Total		61	14	0	0	—		2	0	—		63	14
Sport Boys	2018	Bolivian Primera División	30	4	—		—		—		—		30	4
Always Ready	2019	Bolivian Primera División	29	16	0	0	—		—		—		29	16
Always Ready	2021	Bolivian Primera División	26	17	0	0	—		5 (Note: Appearance(s) in Copa Libertadores)	1	—		31	18
Always Ready	Total		55	33	0	0	—		5	1	—		60	34
Ismaily	2021–22	Egyptian Premier League	2	0	0	0	2	0	—		—		4	0
Always Ready	2022	Bolivian Primera División	21	3	0	0	—		—		—		21	3
Bolívar	2023	Bolivian Primera División	26	9	0	0	—		7	0	14 (Note: Appearance(s) in 2023 Copa de la División Profesional)	4	47	13
Bolívar	2024	Bolivian Primera División	13	7	—		—		4	0	—		17	7
Bolívar	Total		39	16	0	0	—		11	0	14	4	64	20
Kalamata	2024–25	Super League Greece 2	16	1	0	0	—		—		—		16	1
Career total			224	71	0	0	2	0	18	1	14	4	258	76

=== International ===
As of matches played 10 October 2025

National team	Year	Apps	Goals
Bolivia	2016	2	0
Bolivia	2019	2	0
Bolivia	2021	6	0
Bolivia	2022	2	0
Bolivia	2023	7	1
Bolivia	2024	12	3
Bolivia	2025	7	0
Total		38	4

List of international goals scored by Carmelo Algarañaz
No.	Date	Venue	Opponent	Score	Result	Competition
1.	28 March 2023	Prince Abdullah Al-Faisal Stadium, Jeddah, Saudi Arabia	Saudi Arabia	2–1	2–1	Friendly
2.	22 March 2024	Nelson Mandela Stadium, Algiers, Algeria	Algeria	1–1	2–3	2024 FIFA Series
3.	5 September 2024	Estadio Municipal de El Alto, El Alto, Bolivia	Venezuela	2–0	4–0	2026 FIFA World Cup qualification
4.	10 September 2024	Estadio Nacional, Santiago, Chile	Chile	1–0	2–1	2026 FIFA World Cup qualification
