= Miguel Terceros =

Bolivian footballer (born 2004)

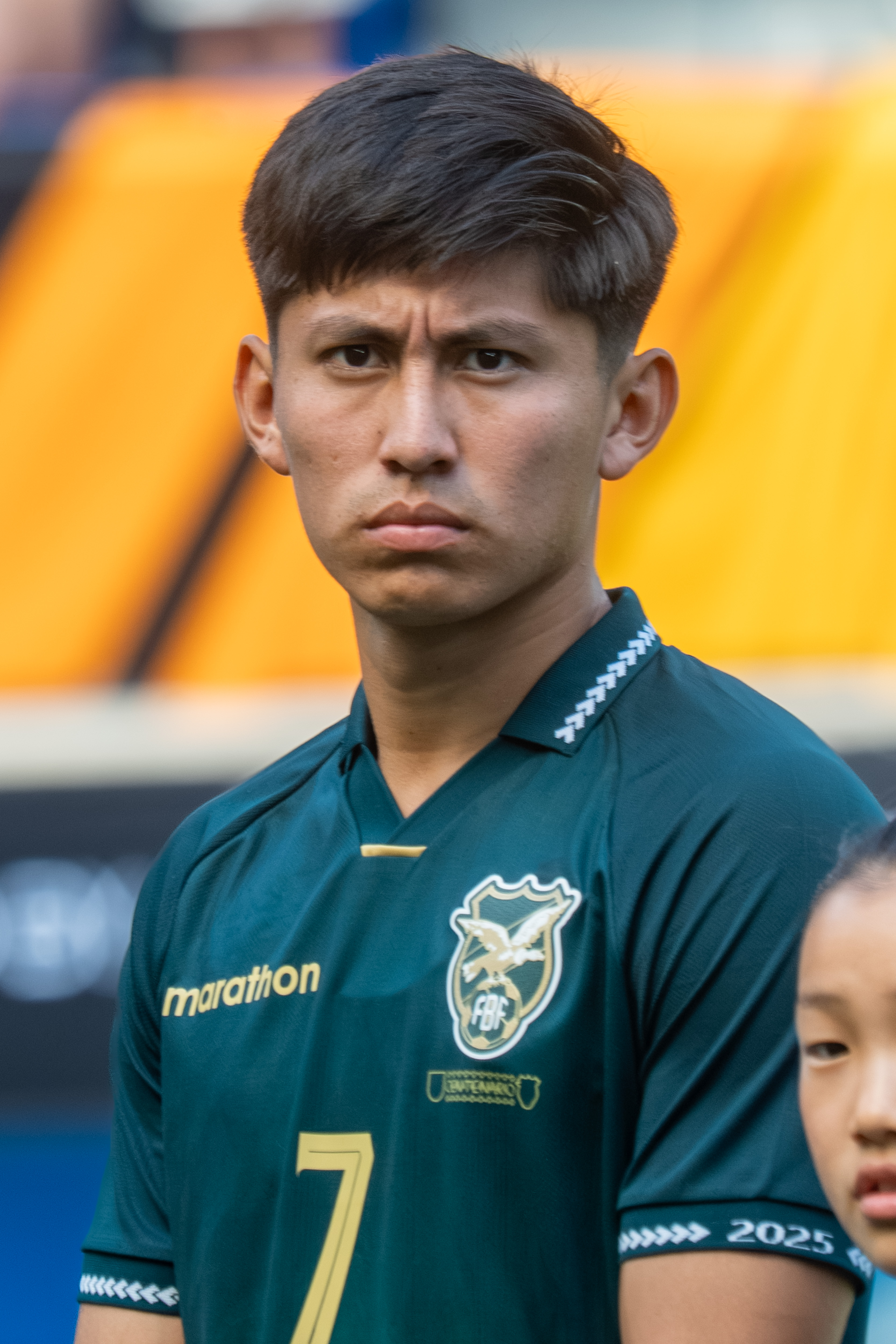
- Terceros with Bolivia in 2026

Personal information
- Full name: Miguel Ángel Terceros Acuña
- Date of birth: 25 April 2004 (age 22)
- Place of birth: Santa Cruz de la Sierra, Bolivia
- Height: 1.77 m (5 ft 10 in)
- Positions: Attacking midfielder; winger

Team information
- Current team: Santos
- Number: 30

Youth career
- 2009–2015: Academia Tahuichi
- 2015–2018: Proyecto Bolivia 2022
- 2018–2024: Santos

Senior career*
Years	Team	Apps	(Gls)
2022–	Santos	32	(1)
2025	→ América Mineiro (loan)	25	(7)

International career^{‡}
2019	Bolivia U15	8	(2)
2020	Bolivia U20	2	(0)
2022–	Bolivia	38	(9)
- * Club domestic league appearances and goals as of 22:29, 21 September 2026 (UTC) ‡ National team caps and goals as of 17:31, 19 November 2026 (UTC)

Miguel Ángel Terceros Acuña (born 25 April 2004), sometimes known as Miguelito, is a Bolivian professional footballer who plays as an attacking midfielder or a winger for Brazilian club Santos and the Bolivia national team.

== Club career ==
=== Early career ===
Born in Santa Cruz de la Sierra, Terceros began his career with Academia Tahuichi at the age of five. In 2015, aged 11, he joined Proyecto Bolivia 2022, a social project which had partnerships with several clubs in South America.

=== Santos ===
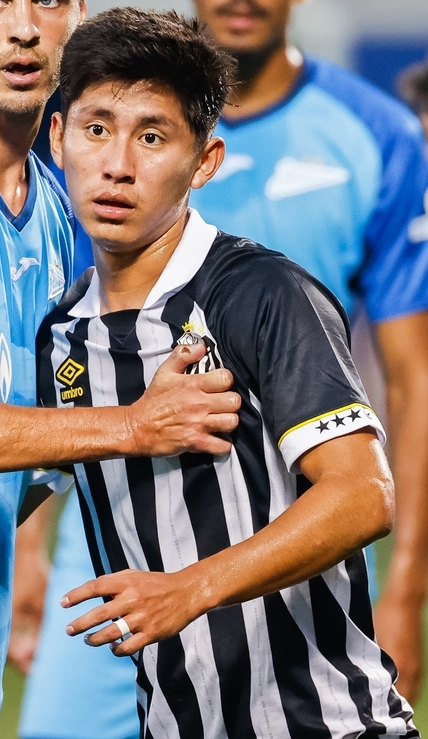
Terceros playing with Santos in 2024

Terceros joined Santos in 2018, aged 14, after being approved on a trial. However, as FIFA does not allow transfers of under-18 foreign players, he did not sign a contract with the club, only having an exchange program arrangement.

In March 2021, Terceros impressed during trainings and started to feature with Santos' under-23 squad. On 26 April 2022, one day after his 18th birthday, he signed a contract with the club until April 2027.

Terceros was officially able to play for Santos in July 2022, after being registered once the transfer window opened; he started to feature in the under-20 squad. He made his first team – and Série A – debut on 10 October, coming on as a late substitute for goalscorer Lucas Braga in a 4–1 home success over Juventude; he also became the first Bolivian to play for the club.

In the following two seasons, Terceros featured rarely with the main squad: in 2023, he mainly appeared with the under-20s, and in 2024, now fully integrated as a first team member, he was often a third-choice under head coach Fábio Carille. Despite being sparingly used in the first match of the 2025 season, he lost space after the arrivals of new signings Benjamín Rollheiser, Thaciano, Gabriel Veron and Álvaro Barreal, and was close to a loan deal to Ukrainian side Dynamo Kyiv in February, but the deal later collapsed.

==== Loan to América Mineiro ====
On 21 March 2025, América Mineiro announced the signing of Terceros on loan until the end of the season. He immediately became a starter for the new side, scoring seven goals and providing five assists as the club avoided relegation.

==== Breakthrough ====
Back to Santos for the 2026 season, Terceros was included in the first team squad by head coach Juan Pablo Vojvoda. Regularly used in the first two months of the campaign, he lost space in the first matches after the arrival of Cuca, but regained his starting spot in May, and scored his first goal for Peixe on the 30th of that month, in a 3–1 home win over Vitória.

On 12 June 2026, Terceros renewed his contract with Peixe until May 2029.

== International career ==
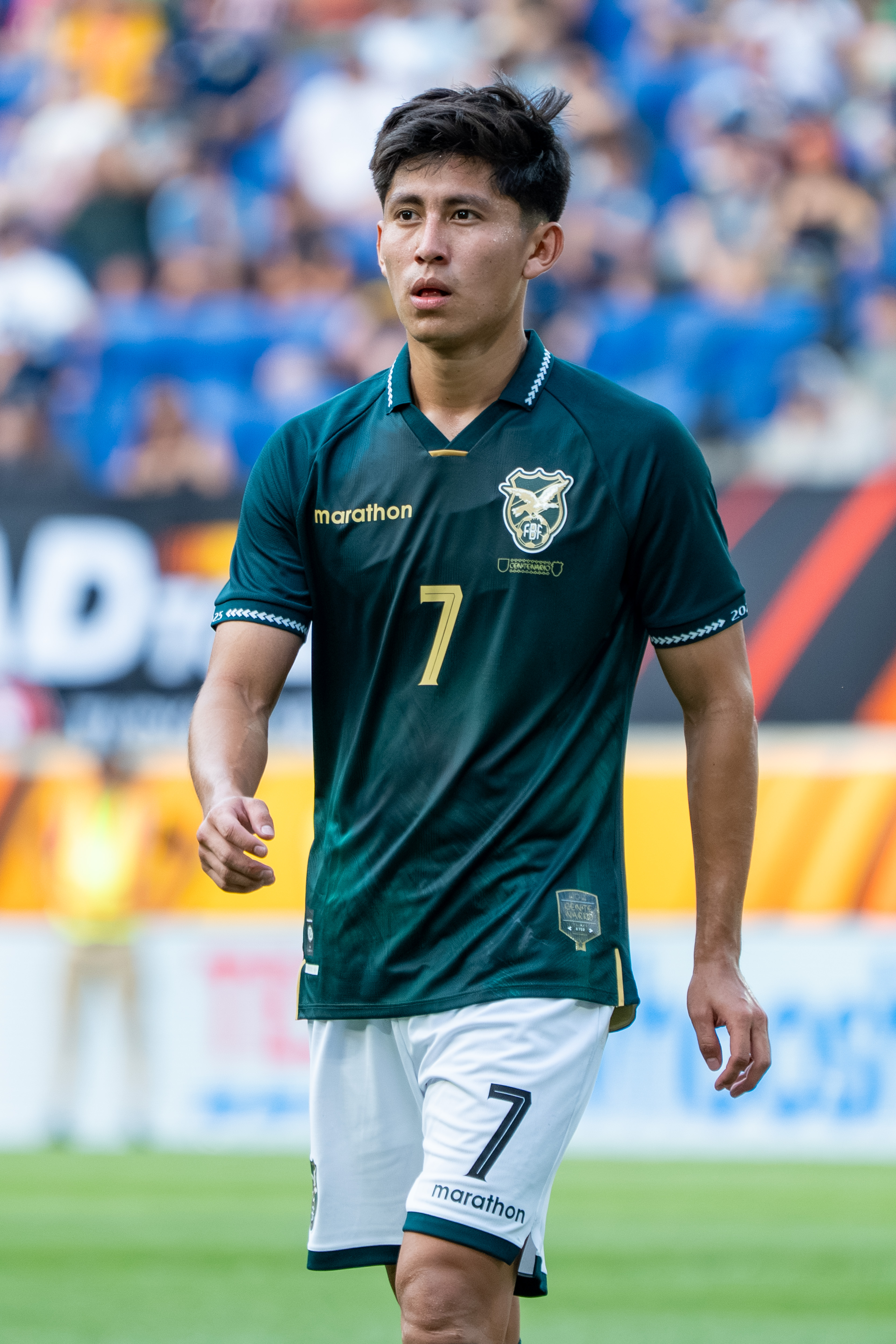
Terceros playing for the Bolivia national team in 2026

Terceros featured for the Bolivia under-15 national team in the 2019 South American U-15 Championship, playing in all five matches during the competition. In December 2020, aged just 16, he was called up by manager César Farías with the under-20s for an international friendly tournament in Rio de Janeiro.

On 30 October 2021, Terceros was called up by Farías, but now to the full side for one friendly against El Salvador and two 2022 FIFA World Cup qualifying matches against Peru and Peru. He made his full international debut on 24 September 2022, replacing Ramiro Vaca in a 2–0 friendly loss against Senegal in Orléans, France.

On 24 May 2024, Terceros was included in Antônio Carlos Zago's 26-man squad for the 2024 Copa América. He scored his first international goal on 12 June, in a 3–1 friendly loss to Ecuador at the Subaru Park in Chester, Pennsylvania; it was also his first professional goal.

Terceros was Bolivia's top scorer in the 2026 FIFA World Cup qualifiers with seven goals, only one behind Lionel Messi. On 26 March 2026, he scored the winner in a 2–1 win over Suriname to send the nation to the inter-confederation play-off final.

== Personal life ==
In May 2025, Terceros was accused of racial abuse by Allano during a match between América Mineiro and Operário Ferroviário; he was sentenced to a five-match ban.

== Career statistics ==
=== Club ===
As of 21 September 2026

Appearances and goals by club, season and competition
Club	Season	League			State league		Copa do Brasil		Continental		Total	
Club	Season	Division	Apps	Goals	Apps	Goals	Apps	Goals	Apps	Goals	Apps	Goals
Santos	2022	Série A	2	0	—		0	0	—		2	0
Santos	2023	Série A	2	0	0	0	2	0	3 (Note: Appearances in Copa Sudamericana)	0	7	0
Santos	2024	Série B	5	0	—		—		—		5	0
Santos	2025	Série A	0	0	4	0	0	0	—		4	0
Santos	2026	Série A	11	1	8	0	1	0	6	1	26	2
Santos	Total		20	1	12	0	3	0	9	1	44	2
América Mineiro (loan)	2025	Série B	25	7	—		—		—		25	7
Career total			45	8	12	0	3	0	9	1	69	9

=== International ===
As of 19 November 2026

Appearances and goals by national team and year
National team	Year	Apps	Goals
Bolivia	2022	2	0
Bolivia	2023	6	0
Bolivia	2024	11	5
Bolivia	2025	11	3
Bolivia	2026	8	1
Total		38	9

Scores and results list Bolivia's goal tally first, score column indicates score after each Terceros goal.

List of international goals scored by Miguel Terceros
No.	Date	Venue	Opponent	Score	Result	Competition
1	12 June 2024	Subaru Park, Chester, United States	Ecuador	1–3	1–3	Friendly
2	5 September 2024	Estadio Municipal de El Alto, El Alto, Bolivia	Venezuela	3–0	4–0	2026 FIFA World Cup qualification
3	10 September 2024	Estadio Nacional, Santiago, Chile	Chile	2–1	2–1	2026 FIFA World Cup qualification
4	10 October 2024	Estadio Municipal de El Alto, El Alto, Bolivia	Colombia	1–0	1–0	2026 FIFA World Cup qualification
5	19 November 2024	Estadio Municipal de El Alto, El Alto, Bolivia	Paraguay	2–1	2–2	2026 FIFA World Cup qualification
6	20 March 2025	Estadio Nacional, Lima, Peru	Peru	1–2	1–3	2026 FIFA World Cup qualification
7	10 June 2025	Estadio Municipal de El Alto, El Alto, Bolivia	Chile	1–0	2–0	2026 FIFA World Cup qualification
8	9 September 2025	Estadio Municipal de El Alto, El Alto, Bolivia	Brazil	1–0	1–0	2026 FIFA World Cup qualification
9	26 March 2026	Estadio BBVA, Guadalupe, Mexico	Suriname	2–1	2–1	2026 FIFA World Cup qualification

== Honours ==
Santos U20

- Campeonato Paulista Sub-20: 2022

Santos

- Campeonato Brasileiro Série B: 2024
