= 2025 América Futebol Clube (MG) season =

América Futebol Clube
2025 season
- Stadium: Arena Independência
- Série B: Pre-season
- Campeonato Mineiro: Pre-season
- Copa do Brasil: Pre-season
- Average home league attendance: 2,115

The 2025 season is the 111th competitive season for América Futebol Clube (MG). The team is set to compete in the Campeonato Brasileiro Série B for the second consecutive season, the Campeonato Mineiro, and the Copa do Brasil.

== Squad ==
=== Transfers In ===
Pos.	Player	Transferred from	Fee	Date	Source
MF	(Brazil) Figueiredo	(Brazil) Vasco da Gama	Loan	2 January 2025	
MF	(Brazil) Miqueias	(Brazil) Bahia	Loan	3 January 2025	

== Competitions ==
=== Overall record ===
Competition	First match	Last match	Starting round	Record							
Competition	First match	Last match	Starting round	Pld	W	D	L	GF	GA	GD	Win %
Série B	5 April 2025	22 November 2025	Matchday 1	0	0	0	0	0	0	+0	—
Campeonato Mineiro	19 January 2025			1	0	1	0	2	2	+0	0.00
Copa do Brasil				0	0	0	0	0	0	+0	—
Total				1	0	1	0	2	2	+0	0.00

Last updated: 19 January 2025
Source: Competitions

=== Série B ===
==== League table ====
Pos	Team	Pld	W	D	L	GF	GA	GD	Pts
12	Operário Ferroviário	38	12	12	14	40	44	−4	48
13	Vila Nova	38	11	14	13	40	44	−4	47
14	América Mineiro	38	12	10	16	41	44	−3	46
15	Athletic	38	12	8	18	43	53	−10	44
16	Botafogo-SP	38	10	12	16	32	52	−20	42

Source: CBF
Rules for classification: 1) points; 2) wins; 3) goal difference; 4) goals scored; 5) head-to-head results (only between 2 teams); 6) fewest red cards; 7) fewest yellow cards; 8) drawing of lots.

==== Matches ====
27 July 2025 19	América Mineiro	2–2	Athletico Paranaense

2 August 2025 20	Botafogo-SP	2–1	América Mineiro

9 August 2025 21	América Mineiro	0–1	Remo

15 August 2025 22	Amazonas	2–2	América Mineiro

=== Campeonato Mineiro ===
==== Results by round ====
Round	1	2
Ground	A	H
Result	D	
Position		

Updated to match(es) played on 19 January 2025. Source:
A = Away; H = Home; W = Win; D = Draw; L = Loss

19 January 2025 1	Uberlândia	2–2	América Mineiro
21:00 UTC−3

22 January 2025 2	América Mineiro	v	Pouso Alegre
19:00 UTC−3
