= Piero Maza =

Chilean football referee (born 1984)

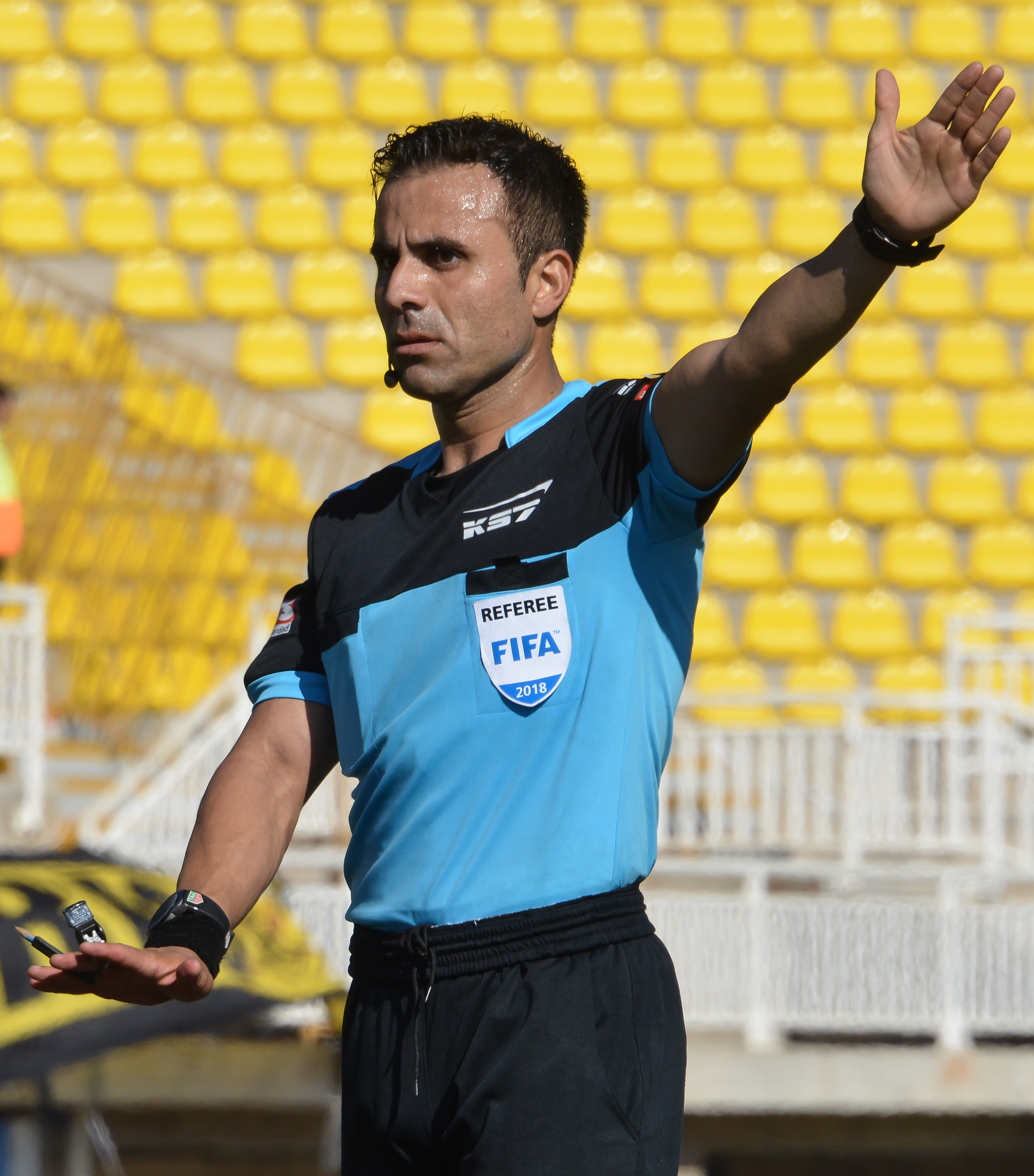
- Maza in 2018
- Full name: Piero Daniel Maza Gómez
- Born: 25 October 1984 (age 42); Santiago, Chile

Domestic
Years	League	Role
2014–	Chilean Primera División	Referee

International
Years	League	Role
2018–	FIFA listed	Referee
2021–	FIFA listed	Video official

Piero Daniel Maza Gómez (born 25 October 1984) is a Chilean football referee who officiates in the Chilean Primera División. He has been a FIFA referee since 2018.

== Refereeing career ==
Maza began officiating in the Chilean Primera División during the 2014–15 season. He refereed his first match on 27 July 2014 between Cobresal and Palestino. In 2018, Maza was added to the FIFA International Referees List. He officiated his first CONMEBOL club match that year on 10 April, a Copa Sudamericana fixture between Ecuadorian club LDU Quito and Bolivian club Guabirá. The following month on 24 May, he officiated his first fixture in the Copa Libertadores, a match between Ecuadorian club Emelec and Colombian club Santa Fe. In 2021, Maza was also added as a video match official on the FIFA list.

In November 2018, Maza was appointed as an assistant VAR official for the first leg of the 2018 Copa Libertadores Finals between Argentine clubs Boca Juniors and River Plate. The following month, he served in the same role for the second leg of the 2018 Copa Sudamericana Finals between Brazilian club Atlético Paranaense and Colombian club Junior. He again worked as an assistant VAR in the 2019 Copa Libertadores Final between Brazilian club Flamengo and River Plate in November 2019, as well as in the second leg of the 2020 Recopa Sudamericana between Flamengo and Ecuadorian club Independiente del Valle. On 4 September 2021, Maza officiated his first major competition final in the 2021 Copa Chile between Colo-Colo and Everton.

Maza has officiated at a number of international tournaments during his career. Prior to becoming a FIFA referee, he was selected as an official for the 2017 South American U-15 Championship in Argentina. In 2019, he was selected as a referee for the 2019 South American U-20 Championship in his home country, where he officiated five matches. Later that year, Maza was selected to participate at the 2019 Copa América in Brazil, where he served as a fourth official and assistant VAR. He was also selected as a video referee for the 2019 FIFA U-17 World Cup in Brazil. The following year, he was an official at the 2020 CONMEBOL Pre-Olympic Tournament in Colombia, a competition for under-23 teams, where he led three matches.

Maza has also refereed national league matches outside of Chile. On 30 October 2021, he officiated a match in the 2021–22 Saudi Professional League between Al-Fayha and Al-Nassr. In March 2022, he also was the referee in the 2022 Peruvian Liga 1 match between Universidad César Vallejo and Sport Boys.

On 4 April 2022, Maza was fired along with ten other referees by Javier Castrilli, the head of the Chilean football referees committee, as an attempt to give more opportunities to younger referees. However, they were all reinstated days later due to pressure from the referees' union, with Castrilli instead fired by the Football Federation of Chile.

On 30 May 2022, Maza was appointed as a referee for his first senior international match, the 2022 Finalissima between UEFA Euro 2020 winners Italy and 2021 Copa América winners Argentina. His fellow countrymen Christian Schiemann and Claudio Ríos were appointed as his assistant referees.

The match was played at Wembley Stadium on 1 June 2022 and ended in a 3–0 win for Argentina. Maza had not been included in the list of referees for the 2022 FIFA World Cup.

Maza officiated several matches in the 2026 FIFA World Cup qualification (CONMEBOL).[N1] These included the match between Brazil and Argentina at the Maracanã in November 2023, which Argentina won 1–0, and Brazil’s 1–1 draw with Uruguay in 2024. On 5 June 2025 he refereed Ecuador against Brazil at the Estadio Monumental in Guayaquil, his first match involving Ecuador’s national team. Despite a strong 2025 season, in which he refereed decisive Copa Libertadores and Copa Sudamericana matches, Maza was not among the Chilean referees nominated for the 2026 FIFA World Cup. That year he was also named best referee of the season in Chilean football at the Gala Crack awards.

== Honours ==
- Chilean Primera División Best Referee: 2025

Sporting positions (Chile) Piero Maza
Preceded by 1993 (Hungary) Sándor Puhl	Finalissima referee 2022	Succeeded by ~~2026~~
