= Kevin Ortega (referee) =

Peruvian football referee (born 1992)

- Full name: Kevin Paolo Ortega Pimentel
- Born: 26 March 1992 (age 34); Callao, Peru

Domestic
Years	League	Role
2015–	Peruvian Primera División	Referee

International
Years	League	Role
2019–	FIFA	Referee

Kevin Paolo Ortega Pimentel (born 26 March 1992) is a Peruvian football referee who is a listed international referee for FIFA since 2019. He has also been officiating matches in the Peruvian Primera División since 2015. Ortega is one of the youngest referees in the Peruvian Football Federation.

In 2021, he officiated three games, including the semi-final, at the Tokyo Summer Olympics, and in 2022, he was appointed to the 36-referee squad for the FIFA World Cup in Qatar, accompanied by assistants Michael Orué and Jesús Sánchez.

== Refereeing career ==
He worked in SUNAT from 2014 to 2015. On 12 May 2015, Ortega made his debut in the Primera División, the highest Peruvian division, at the age of 23. During the game between Unión Comercio and Alianza Atlético (5–2), he drew the yellow card twice. Ortega has also been regularly used in the South American club competitions, the Copa Libertadores and the Copa Sudamericana.

=== International ===
Ortega became an international referee on the FIFA list in 2019. He made his international debut in March 2019 in a match at the 2019 South American U-17 Championship between Argentina and Colombia. He was summoned to officiate a match in November of that year in a friendly between Ecuador and Trinidad and Tobago.

In 2021, Ortega was nominated for the 2020 Summer Olympics Football Tournament in Tokyo. He featured in three games including the semi-final. In May 2022, Ortega was appointed in the 36 referee squad for the 2022 FIFA World Cup in Qatar. He was accompanied by his assistants Michael Orué and Jesús Sánchez.

=== Controversies ===
At the Copa Libertadores game between Club Always Ready from Bolivia and Boca Juniors from Argentina in May 2022, he was at the center of a controversy. Boca Juniors won the game 1–0 on a controversial penalty, after which the Bolivian police searched the referee's booth and seized several Boca Junior shirts that had been given to the referee team before the game. Always Ready representatives accused Ortega of taking advantage, while Boca Juniors stated that the gifts were a standard gesture.

Ortega received additional criticism during the 2024 Copa America match between the United States and Uruguay. Ortega made several contentious calls, including allowing a fast free kick to be taken by Uruguay while he had begun issuing a yellow card to Chris Richards. U.S. team captain Christian Pulisic voiced his frustration with Ortega's decisions, criticizing Ortega for providing no explanations for his decisions.
