= El Alto Municipal Stadium =

Football stadium

Estadio Municipal de El Alto
- Estadio Municipal de Villa Ingenio
- Interactive map of Estadio Municipal de El Alto
- Full name: Estadio Municipal de El Alto
- Location: El Alto, Bolivia
- Coordinates: 16°28′21″S 68°12′06″W
- Elevation: 4,088 m (13,412 ft)
- Owner: El Alto Government
- Capacity: 23,000
- Surface: Artificial grass

Construction
- Built: 1 December 2013 – July 2017
- Opened: 16 July 2017
- Renovated: 2023–2024
- Cost: US$ 8 million 55.8 million bolivianos

Tenants
- Always Ready (2017–present); Deportivo FATIC (2017–present); Bolivia national football team (selected matches)

El Alto Municipal Stadium (Spanish: Estadio Municipal de El Alto), sometimes known as Estadio de Villa Ingenio, is a multi-use stadium in El Alto, Bolivia. It is currently used mostly for football matches, on club level by local clubs Always Ready and ABB. The stadium has a capacity of 23,000 spectators and is located at an altitude of 4,088 meters (13,412 feet) above sea level.

== History ==
The construction of the stadium began in December 2013, and was initially expected to be completed in December 2016. The stadium was inaugurated on 16 July 2017, with a match between Bolívar and The Strongest.
