= 2024 Copa América squads =

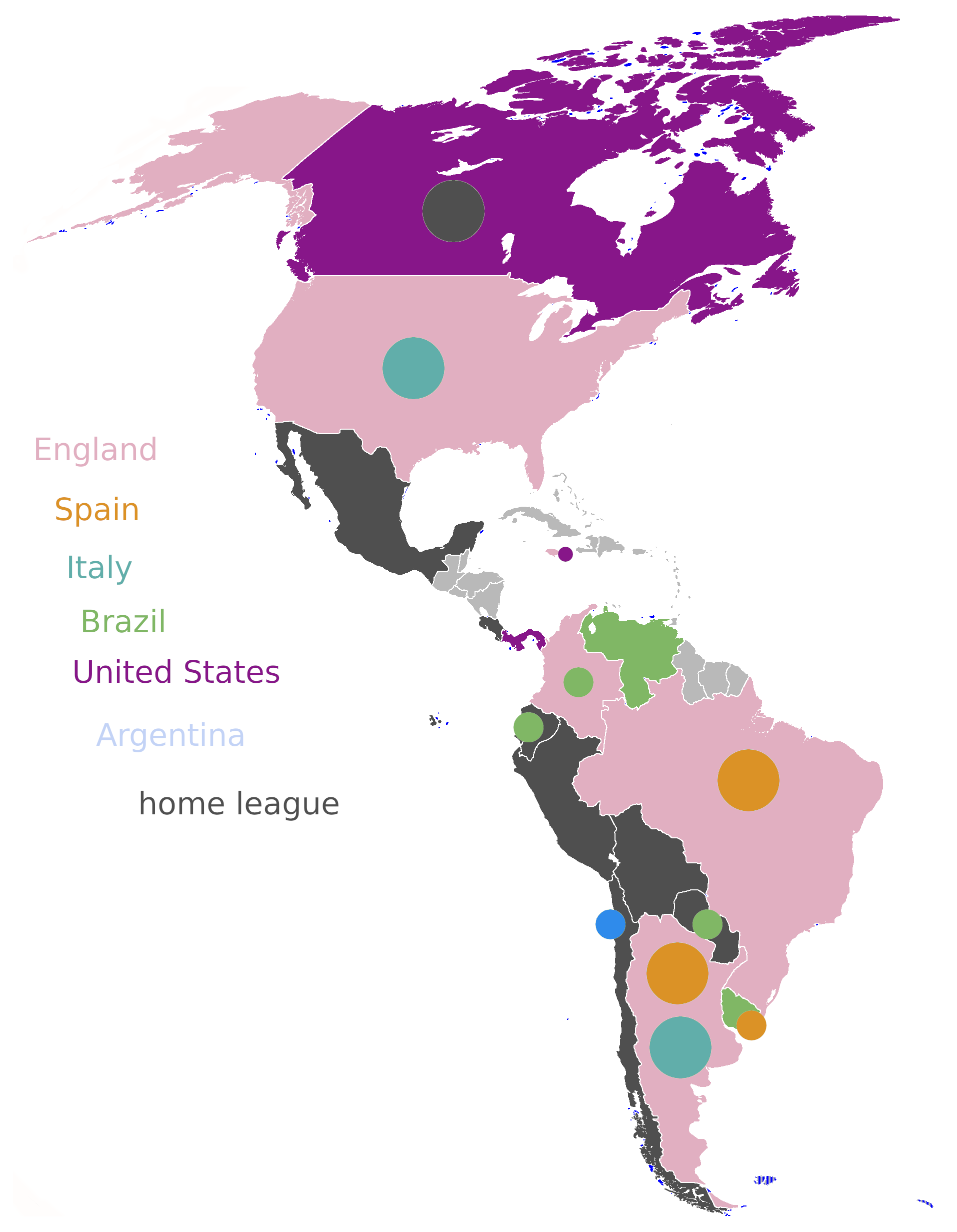
2024 Copa América squads by most common league (more precisely, by club associations, according to flags in this article). A background means the highest number of players in a given team, from a given league. A dot/circle means another league, with at least 5 players in the given team.

The 2024 Copa América was an international soccer tournament held in the United States from June 20 to July 14, 2024. The sixteen participating national teams were required to register a squad of up to 26 players, including at least three goalkeepers. Only players in these squads were eligible to take part in the tournament.

On May 16, 2024, CONMEBOL announced an increase in the final squads from 23 to a maximum of 26 players. The decision was made by the CONMEBOL Council at the request of some member associations, and teams were able to opt for a final list of minimum 23 and maximum 26 players.

Each national team had to submit to CONMEBOL, via the COMET system, a provisional list with a minimum of 35 and a maximum of 55 players (including at least four goalkeepers) by May 5, 2024, 18:00 PYT (UTC−4) (Regulations Article 58). The final list or squad list of up to 26 players per national team had to be submitted to CONMEBOL by June 15, 2024, 18:00 PYT (UTC−4), a week prior to the start of the tournament. All players in the final selection had to be chosen from the respective provisional list (Regulations Article 60).

Once the final lists were submitted, teams were only permitted to make replacements in cases of serious injury, illness or for medical reasons up to 24 hours before the first match of the team in the competition. All substitutions had to be approved by the CONMEBOL Medical Commission and the replacement players had to come from the provisional list (Regulations Article 71).

The provisional lists were not published by CONMEBOL as they were only for internal use (only Chile and Venezuela published their complete provisional lists). The final squads were published by CONMEBOL on June 14, 2024.

The age listed for each player is as of June 20, 2024, the first day of the tournament. The numbers of caps and goals listed for each player do not include any matches played after the start of the tournament. The club listed is the club for which the player last played a competitive match prior to the tournament. (Note: This is the club a player was last able to play for during the previous season in the event a player did not play a competitive match.) The nationality for each club reflects the national association (not the league) to which the club is affiliated. A flag is included for coaches who are of a different nationality to their national team.

== Group A ==
=== Argentina ===
Argentina announced their 26-man final squad on June 15, 2024.

Head coach: Lionel Scaloni

No.	Pos.	Player	Date of birth (age)	Caps	Goals	Club
1	GK	Franco Armani	October 16, 1986 (aged 37)	19	0	(Argentine Football Association) River Plate
2	DF	Lucas Martínez Quarta	May 10, 1996 (aged 28)	14	0	(Italian Football Federation) Fiorentina
3	DF	Nicolás Tagliafico	August 31, 1992 (aged 31)	57	1	(French Football Federation) Lyon
4	DF	Gonzalo Montiel	January 1, 1997 (aged 27)	26	1	(The Football Association) Nottingham Forest
5	MF	Leandro Paredes	June 29, 1994 (aged 29)	62	5	(Italian Football Federation) Roma
6	DF	Germán Pezzella	June 27, 1991 (aged 32)	40	3	(Royal Spanish Football Federation) Real Betis
7	MF	Rodrigo De Paul	May 24, 1994 (aged 30)	64	2	(Royal Spanish Football Federation) Atlético Madrid
8	DF	Marcos Acuña	October 28, 1991 (aged 32)	57	0	(Royal Spanish Football Federation) Sevilla
9	FW	Julián Alvarez	January 31, 2000 (aged 24)	31	7	(The Football Association) Manchester City
10	FW	Lionel Messi (captain)	June 24, 1987 (aged 36)	182	108	(United States Soccer Federation) Inter Miami
11	FW	Ángel Di María (vice-captain)	February 14, 1988 (aged 36)	140	31	(Portuguese Football Federation) Benfica
12	GK	Gerónimo Rulli	May 20, 1992 (aged 32)	4	0	(Royal Dutch Football Association) Ajax
13	DF	Cristian Romero	April 27, 1998 (aged 26)	31	3	(The Football Association) Tottenham Hotspur
14	MF	Exequiel Palacios	October 5, 1998 (aged 25)	29	0	(German Football Association) Bayer Leverkusen
15	FW	Nicolás González	April 6, 1998 (aged 26)	34	5	(Italian Football Federation) Fiorentina
16	MF	Giovani Lo Celso	April 9, 1996 (aged 28)	52	3	(The Football Association) Tottenham Hotspur
17	FW	Alejandro Garnacho	July 1, 2004 (aged 19)	5	0	(The Football Association) Manchester United
18	MF	Guido Rodríguez	April 12, 1994 (aged 30)	29	1	(Royal Spanish Football Federation) Real Betis
19	DF	Nicolás Otamendi	February 12, 1988 (aged 36)	112	6	(Portuguese Football Federation) Benfica
20	MF	Alexis Mac Allister	December 24, 1998 (aged 25)	26	2	(The Football Association) Liverpool
21	FW	Valentín Carboni	March 5, 2005 (aged 19)	2	0	(Italian Football Federation) Monza
22	FW	Lautaro Martínez	August 22, 1997 (aged 26)	58	24	(Italian Football Federation) Inter Milan
23	GK	Emiliano Martínez	September 2, 1992 (aged 31)	39	0	(The Football Association) Aston Villa
24	MF	Enzo Fernández	January 17, 2001 (aged 23)	23	4	(The Football Association) Chelsea
25	DF	Lisandro Martínez	January 18, 1998 (aged 26)	18	0	(The Football Association) Manchester United
26	DF	Nahuel Molina	April 6, 1998 (aged 26)	38	1	(Royal Spanish Football Federation) Atlético Madrid

=== Peru ===
Peru announced their final 26-man squad on June 15, 2024. Previously, midfielder Renato Tapia had announced that he would be resigning his spot on the team due to administrative issues.

Head coach: (Uruguay) Jorge Fossati

No.	Pos.	Player	Date of birth (age)	Caps	Goals	Club
1	GK	Pedro Gallese	February 23, 1990 (aged 34)	106	0	(United States Soccer Federation) Orlando City SC
2	DF	Luis Abram	February 27, 1996 (aged 28)	41	1	(United States Soccer Federation) Atlanta United FC
3	DF	Aldo Corzo	May 20, 1989 (aged 35)	51	0	(Peruvian Football Federation) Universitario
4	DF	Anderson Santamaría	January 10, 1992 (aged 32)	28	0	(Mexican Football Federation) Atlas
5	DF	Carlos Zambrano	July 10, 1989 (aged 34)	72	4	(Peruvian Football Federation) Alianza Lima
6	DF	Marcos López	November 20, 1999 (aged 24)	35	0	(Royal Dutch Football Association) Feyenoord
7	FW	Andy Polo	September 29, 1994 (aged 29)	45	1	(Peruvian Football Federation) Universitario
8	MF	Sergio Peña	September 28, 1995 (aged 28)	38	4	(Swedish Football Association) Malmö FF
9	FW	Paolo Guerrero (captain)	January 1, 1984 (aged 40)	119	39	(Peruvian Football Federation) Universidad César Vallejo
10	MF	Christian Cueva	November 23, 1991 (aged 32)	98	16	Free agent
11	FW	Bryan Reyna	August 23, 1998 (aged 25)	10	2	(Argentine Football Association) Belgrano
12	GK	Carlos Cáceda	September 27, 1991 (aged 32)	8	0	(Peruvian Football Federation) Melgar
13	MF	Jesús Castillo	June 11, 2001 (aged 23)	9	1	(Portuguese Football Federation) Gil Vicente
14	FW	Gianluca Lapadula	February 7, 1990 (aged 34)	33	9	(Italian Football Federation) Cagliari
15	DF	Miguel Araujo	October 24, 1994 (aged 29)	32	0	(United States Soccer Federation) Portland Timbers
16	MF	Wilder Cartagena	September 23, 1994 (aged 29)	33	0	(United States Soccer Federation) Orlando City SC
17	DF	Luis Advíncula	March 2, 1990 (aged 34)	118	2	(Argentine Football Association) Boca Juniors
18	FW	André Carrillo	June 14, 1991 (aged 33)	99	11	(Saudi Arabian Football Federation) Al-Qadsiah
19	DF	Oliver Sonne	November 10, 2000 (aged 23)	3	0	(Danish Football Association) Silkeborg
20	FW	Edison Flores	May 15, 1994 (aged 30)	73	16	(Peruvian Football Federation) Universitario
21	GK	Diego Romero	August 17, 2001 (aged 22)	0	0	(Peruvian Football Federation) Universitario
22	DF	Alexander Callens	May 4, 1992 (aged 32)	41	1	(Hellenic Football Federation) AEK Athens
23	MF	Piero Quispe	August 14, 2001 (aged 22)	6	1	(Mexican Football Federation) UNAM
24	FW	José Rivera	May 8, 1997 (aged 27)	3	0	(Peruvian Football Federation) Universitario
25	FW	Joao Grimaldo	February 20, 2003 (aged 21)	7	1	(Peruvian Football Federation) Sporting Cristal
26	FW	Franco Zanelatto	May 9, 2000 (aged 24)	4	0	(Peruvian Football Federation) Alianza Lima

=== Chile ===
Chile announced their 55-man provisional list on May 5, 2024. The final squad of 26 players was announced on June 13.

Head coach: (Argentina) Ricardo Gareca

No.	Pos.	Player	Date of birth (age)	Caps	Goals	Club
1	GK	Claudio Bravo (captain)	April 13, 1983 (aged 41)	148	0	(Royal Spanish Football Federation) Real Betis
2	DF	Gabriel Suazo	August 9, 1997 (aged 26)	25	0	(French Football Federation) Toulouse
3	DF	Guillermo Maripán	May 6, 1994 (aged 30)	47	2	(French Football Federation) Monaco
4	MF	Mauricio Isla	June 12, 1988 (aged 36)	139	5	(Argentine Football Association) Independiente
5	DF	Paulo Díaz	August 25, 1994 (aged 29)	46	1	(Argentine Football Association) River Plate
6	DF	Thomas Galdames	November 20, 1998 (aged 25)	0	0	(Argentine Football Association) Godoy Cruz
7	MF	Marcelino Núñez	March 1, 2000 (aged 24)	25	5	(The Football Association) Norwich City
8	FW	Darío Osorio	January 24, 2004 (aged 20)	8	1	(Danish Football Association) Midtjylland
9	FW	Víctor Dávila	November 4, 1997 (aged 26)	11	3	(Russian Football Union) CSKA Moscow
10	FW	Alexis Sánchez	December 19, 1988 (aged 35)	163	51	(Italian Football Federation) Inter Milan
11	FW	Eduardo Vargas	November 20, 1989 (aged 34)	109	42	(Brazilian Football Confederation) Atlético Mineiro
12	GK	Gabriel Arias	September 13, 1987 (aged 36)	16	0	(Argentine Football Association) Racing
13	MF	Erick Pulgar	January 15, 1994 (aged 30)	49	4	(Brazilian Football Confederation) Flamengo
14	FW	Cristián Zavala	August 3, 1999 (aged 24)	3	0	(Football Federation of Chile) Colo-Colo
15	MF	Diego Valdés	January 30, 1994 (aged 30)	31	2	(Mexican Football Federation) América
16	DF	Igor Lichnovsky	March 7, 1994 (aged 30)	10	0	(Mexican Football Federation) América
17	MF	Esteban Pavez	May 1, 1990 (aged 34)	13	0	(Football Federation of Chile) Colo-Colo
18	MF	Rodrigo Echeverría	April 17, 1995 (aged 29)	11	1	(Argentine Football Association) Huracán
19	FW	Marcos Bolados	February 28, 1996 (aged 28)	7	2	(Football Federation of Chile) Colo-Colo
20	FW	Maximiliano Guerrero	January 15, 2000 (aged 24)	1	0	(Football Federation of Chile) Universidad de Chile
21	DF	Matías Catalán	August 19, 1992 (aged 31)	7	0	(Argentine Football Association) Talleres
22	FW	Ben Brereton Díaz	April 18, 1999 (aged 25)	30	7	(The Football Association) Sheffield United
23	GK	Brayan Cortés	March 11, 1995 (aged 29)	16	0	(Football Federation of Chile) Colo-Colo
24	MF	César Pérez	November 29, 2002 (aged 21)	3	0	(Football Federation of Chile) Unión La Calera
25	DF	Benjamín Kuscevic	May 2, 1996 (aged 28)	8	0	(Brazilian Football Confederation) Fortaleza
26	DF	Nicolás Fernández	August 3, 1999 (aged 24)	2	0	(Football Federation of Chile) Audax Italiano

=== Canada ===
Canada announced their 26-man final squad on June 15, 2024. Joel Waterman replaced Junior Hoilett, who was forced to withdraw from the final squad due to injury.

Head coach: (United States) Jesse Marsch

No.	Pos.	Player	Date of birth (age)	Caps	Goals	Club
1	GK	Dayne St. Clair	May 9, 1997 (aged 27)	5	0	(United States Soccer Federation) Minnesota United FC
2	DF	Alistair Johnston	October 8, 1998 (aged 25)	42	1	(Scottish Football Association) Celtic
3	DF	Luc de Fougerolles	October 12, 2005 (aged 18)	1	0	(The Football Association) Fulham
4	DF	Kamal Miller	May 16, 1997 (aged 27)	43	0	(United States Soccer Federation) Portland Timbers
5	DF	Joel Waterman	January 24, 1996 (aged 28)	3	0	(Canadian Soccer Association) CF Montréal
6	MF	Samuel Piette	November 12, 1994 (aged 29)	69	0	(Canadian Soccer Association) CF Montréal
7	MF	Stephen Eustáquio	December 21, 1996 (aged 27)	37	4	(Portuguese Football Federation) Porto
8	MF	Ismaël Koné	June 16, 2002 (aged 22)	19	2	(The Football Association) Watford
9	FW	Cyle Larin	April 17, 1995 (aged 29)	68	29	(Royal Spanish Football Federation) Mallorca
10	FW	Jonathan David	January 14, 2000 (aged 24)	48	26	(French Football Federation) Lille
11	FW	Theo Bair	August 27, 1999 (aged 24)	2	1	(Scottish Football Association) Motherwell
12	FW	Jacen Russell-Rowe	September 13, 2002 (aged 21)	5	0	(United States Soccer Federation) Columbus Crew
13	DF	Derek Cornelius	November 25, 1997 (aged 26)	20	0	(Swedish Football Association) Malmö FF
14	FW	Jacob Shaffelburg	November 26, 1999 (aged 24)	10	2	(United States Soccer Federation) Nashville SC
15	DF	Moïse Bombito	March 30, 2000 (aged 24)	6	0	(United States Soccer Federation) Colorado Rapids
16	GK	Maxime Crépeau	May 11, 1994 (aged 30)	17	0	(United States Soccer Federation) Portland Timbers
17	FW	Tajon Buchanan	February 8, 1999 (aged 25)	38	4	(Italian Football Federation) Inter Milan
18	GK	Tom McGill	March 25, 2000 (aged 24)	0	0	(The Football Association) Brighton & Hove Albion
19	DF	Alphonso Davies (captain)	November 2, 2000 (aged 23)	47	15	(German Football Association) Bayern Munich
20	MF	Ali Ahmed	October 10, 2000 (aged 23)	4	0	(Canadian Soccer Association) Vancouver Whitecaps FC
21	MF	Jonathan Osorio	June 12, 1992 (aged 32)	72	9	(Canadian Soccer Association) Toronto FC
22	DF	Richie Laryea	January 7, 1995 (aged 29)	49	1	(Canadian Soccer Association) Toronto FC
23	FW	Liam Millar	September 27, 1999 (aged 24)	26	1	(The Football Association) Preston North End
24	MF	Mathieu Choinière	February 7, 1999 (aged 25)	3	0	(Canadian Soccer Association) CF Montréal
25	FW	Tani Oluwaseyi	May 15, 2000 (aged 24)	1	0	(United States Soccer Federation) Minnesota United FC
26	DF	Kyle Hiebert	July 30, 1997 (aged 26)	2	0	(United States Soccer Federation) St. Louis City SC

== Group B ==
=== Mexico ===
Mexico announced a reduced provisional list of 31 players on May 10, 2024. On June 11, Mexico announced the final five players to be cut, those being Alexis Peña, Jordan Carrillo, Andrés Montaño, Fernando Beltrán and Víctor Guzmán, thus creating their final 26-man squad which was confirmed on June 14.

Head coach: Jaime Lozano

No.	Pos.	Player	Date of birth (age)	Caps	Goals	Club
1	GK	Julio González	April 23, 1991 (aged 33)	2	0	(Mexican Football Federation) UNAM
2	DF	Jorge Sánchez	December 10, 1997 (aged 26)	41	1	(Portuguese Football Federation) Porto
3	DF	César Montes	February 24, 1997 (aged 27)	44	1	(Royal Spanish Football Federation) Almería
4	MF	Edson Álvarez (captain)	October 24, 1997 (aged 26)	78	5	(The Football Association) West Ham United
5	DF	Johan Vásquez	October 22, 1998 (aged 25)	23	1	(Italian Football Federation) Genoa
6	DF	Gerardo Arteaga	September 7, 1998 (aged 25)	24	1	(Mexican Football Federation) Monterrey
7	MF	Luis Romo	June 5, 1995 (aged 29)	46	3	(Mexican Football Federation) Monterrey
8	MF	Carlos Rodríguez	January 3, 1997 (aged 27)	50	0	(Mexican Football Federation) Cruz Azul
9	FW	Julián Quiñones	March 24, 1997 (aged 27)	5	2	(Mexican Football Federation) América
10	FW	Alexis Vega	November 25, 1997 (aged 26)	29	6	(Mexican Football Federation) Toluca
11	FW	Santiago Giménez	April 18, 2001 (aged 23)	27	4	(Royal Dutch Football Association) Feyenoord
12	GK	Carlos Acevedo	April 19, 1996 (aged 28)	6	0	(Mexican Football Federation) Santos Laguna
13	DF	Jesús Orozco	February 19, 2002 (aged 22)	3	0	(Mexican Football Federation) Guadalajara
14	MF	Érick Sánchez	September 27, 1999 (aged 24)	27	3	(Mexican Football Federation) Pachuca
15	FW	Uriel Antuna	August 21, 1997 (aged 26)	61	13	(Mexican Football Federation) Cruz Azul
16	MF	Jordi Cortizo	June 30, 1996 (aged 27)	4	0	(Mexican Football Federation) Monterrey
17	MF	Orbelín Pineda	March 24, 1996 (aged 28)	70	10	(Hellenic Football Federation) AEK Athens
18	FW	Marcelo Flores	October 1, 2003 (aged 20)	3	0	(Mexican Football Federation) UANL
19	DF	Israel Reyes	May 23, 2000 (aged 24)	15	2	(Mexican Football Federation) América
20	DF	Brian García	October 31, 1997 (aged 26)	2	0	(Mexican Football Federation) Toluca
21	FW	César Huerta	December 3, 2000 (aged 23)	8	1	(Mexican Football Federation) UNAM
22	FW	Guillermo Martínez	March 15, 1995 (aged 29)	3	2	(Mexican Football Federation) UNAM
23	GK	Raúl Rangel	February 25, 2000 (aged 24)	1	0	(Mexican Football Federation) Guadalajara
24	MF	Luis Chávez	January 15, 1996 (aged 28)	31	4	(Russian Football Union) Dynamo Moscow
25	MF	Roberto Alvarado	September 7, 1998 (aged 25)	44	5	(Mexican Football Federation) Guadalajara
26	DF	Bryan González	April 10, 2003 (aged 21)	1	0	(Mexican Football Federation) Pachuca

=== Ecuador ===
Ecuador announced their 26-man final squad on May 29, 2024.

Head coach: (Spain) Félix Sánchez

No.	Pos.	Player	Date of birth (age)	Caps	Goals	Club
1	GK	Hernán Galíndez	March 30, 1987 (aged 37)	19	0	(Argentine Football Association) Huracán
2	DF	Félix Torres	January 11, 1997 (aged 27)	33	5	(Brazilian Football Confederation) Corinthians
3	DF	Piero Hincapié	January 9, 2002 (aged 22)	33	2	(German Football Association) Bayer Leverkusen
4	DF	Joel Ordóñez	April 21, 2004 (aged 20)	2	0	(Royal Belgian Football Association) Club Brugge
5	MF	José Cifuentes	March 12, 1999 (aged 25)	21	0	(Brazilian Football Confederation) Cruzeiro
6	DF	Willian Pacho	October 16, 2001 (aged 22)	12	2	(German Football Association) Eintracht Frankfurt
7	DF	Layan Loor	May 23, 2001 (aged 23)	1	0	(Ecuadorian Football Federation) Universidad Católica
8	DF	Carlos Gruezo	April 19, 1995 (aged 29)	59	1	(United States Soccer Federation) San Jose Earthquakes
9	MF	John Yeboah	June 23, 2000 (aged 23)	3	2	(Polish Football Association) Raków Częstochowa
10	MF	Kendry Páez	May 4, 2007 (aged 17)	9	1	(Ecuadorian Football Federation) Independiente del Valle
11	FW	Kevin Rodríguez	March 4, 2000 (aged 24)	13	1	(Royal Belgian Football Association) Union Saint-Gilloise
12	GK	Moisés Ramírez	September 9, 2000 (aged 23)	6	0	(Ecuadorian Football Federation) Independiente del Valle
13	FW	Enner Valencia (captain)	November 4, 1989 (aged 34)	86	41	(Brazilian Football Confederation) Internacional
14	MF	Alan Minda	May 14, 2003 (aged 21)	4	0	(Royal Belgian Football Association) Cercle Brugge
15	MF	Ángel Mena	January 21, 1988 (aged 36)	59	8	(Mexican Football Federation) León
16	MF	Jeremy Sarmiento	June 16, 2002 (aged 22)	17	1	(The Football Association) Ipswich Town
17	DF	Ángelo Preciado	February 18, 1998 (aged 26)	39	0	(Football Association of the Czech Republic) Sparta Prague
18	MF	Joao Ortiz	May 1, 1996 (aged 28)	9	0	(Ecuadorian Football Federation) Independiente del Valle
19	FW	Jordy Caicedo	November 18, 1997 (aged 26)	14	3	(Mexican Football Federation) Atlas
20	MF	Janner Corozo	September 8, 1995 (aged 28)	4	1	(Ecuadorian Football Federation) Barcelona
21	MF	Alan Franco	August 21, 1998 (aged 25)	36	1	(Brazilian Football Confederation) Atlético Mineiro
22	GK	Alexander Domínguez	June 5, 1987 (aged 37)	74	0	(Ecuadorian Football Federation) LDU Quito
23	MF	Moisés Caicedo	November 2, 2001 (aged 22)	42	3	(The Football Association) Chelsea
24	DF	José Hurtado	December 23, 2001 (aged 22)	8	0	(Brazilian Football Confederation) Red Bull Bragantino
25	DF	Jackson Porozo	August 4, 2000 (aged 23)	8	0	(Turkish Football Federation) Kasımpaşa
26	DF	Andrés Micolta	July 6, 1999 (aged 24)	1	0	(Mexican Football Federation) Pachuca

=== Venezuela ===
Venezuela announced their 47-man provisional list on May 13, 2024. On May 28, the provisional list was reduced to 30 players. The final squad of 26 players was announced on June 15.

Head coach: (Argentina) Fernando Batista

No.	Pos.	Player	Date of birth (age)	Caps	Goals	Club
1	GK	Joel Graterol	February 13, 1997 (aged 27)	12	0	(Colombian Football Federation) América de Cali
2	DF	Nahuel Ferraresi	November 19, 1998 (aged 25)	25	1	(Brazilian Football Confederation) São Paulo
3	DF	Yordan Osorio	May 10, 1994 (aged 30)	29	0	(Italian Football Federation) Parma
4	DF	Jon Aramburu	July 23, 2002 (aged 21)	3	0	(Royal Spanish Football Federation) Real Sociedad
5	DF	Jhon Chancellor	January 2, 1992 (aged 32)	37	3	(Venezuelan Football Federation) Metropolitanos
6	MF	Yangel Herrera	January 7, 1998 (aged 26)	34	3	(Royal Spanish Football Federation) Girona
7	MF	Jefferson Savarino	November 11, 1996 (aged 27)	38	3	(Brazilian Football Confederation) Botafogo
8	MF	Tomás Rincón (captain)	January 13, 1988 (aged 36)	132	1	(Brazilian Football Confederation) Santos
9	FW	Jhonder Cádiz	July 29, 1995 (aged 28)	7	0	(Portuguese Football Federation) Famalicão
10	MF	Yeferson Soteldo	June 30, 1997 (aged 26)	38	4	(Brazilian Football Confederation) Grêmio
11	MF	Darwin Machís	February 7, 1993 (aged 31)	45	11	(Royal Spanish Football Federation) Cádiz
12	GK	José Contreras	October 20, 1994 (aged 29)	6	0	(Colombian Football Federation) Águilas Doradas
13	MF	José Andrés Martínez	September 7, 1994 (aged 29)	28	0	(United States Soccer Federation) Philadelphia Union
14	DF	Christian Makoun	March 5, 2000 (aged 24)	10	0	(Cyprus Football Association) Anorthosis Famagusta
15	DF	Miguel Navarro	February 26, 1999 (aged 25)	11	0	(Argentine Football Association) Talleres
16	MF	Telasco Segovia	April 2, 2003 (aged 21)	2	0	(Portuguese Football Federation) Casa Pia
17	MF	Matías Lacava	October 24, 2002 (aged 21)	0	0	(Portuguese Football Federation) Vizela
18	MF	Cristian Cásseres Jr.	January 20, 2000 (aged 24)	28	0	(French Football Federation) Toulouse
19	FW	Eric Ramírez	November 20, 1998 (aged 25)	9	1	(Colombian Football Federation) Atlético Nacional
20	DF	Wilker Ángel	March 18, 1993 (aged 31)	36	2	(Brazilian Football Confederation) Criciúma
21	DF	Alexander González	November 13, 1992 (aged 31)	68	2	(Ecuadorian Football Federation) Emelec
22	GK	Rafael Romo	February 25, 1990 (aged 34)	20	0	(Ecuadorian Football Federation) Universidad Católica
23	FW	Salomón Rondón	September 16, 1989 (aged 34)	104	41	(Mexican Football Federation) Pachuca
24	MF	Kervin Andrade	April 13, 2005 (aged 19)	1	0	(Brazilian Football Confederation) Fortaleza
25	MF	Eduard Bello	August 20, 1995 (aged 28)	14	2	(Mexican Football Federation) Mazatlán
26	MF	Daniel Pereira	July 14, 2000 (aged 23)	4	0	(United States Soccer Federation) Austin FC

=== Jamaica ===
Jamaica announced their 26-man final squad on June 12, 2024, including forward Leon Bailey. However, Bailey declined the call-up due to differences with the Jamaica Football Federation, reducing the Jamaica's squad to 25 players.

Head coach: (Iceland) Heimir Hallgrímsson

No.	Pos.	Player	Date of birth (age)	Caps	Goals	Club
1	GK	Shaquan Davis	November 11, 2000 (aged 23)	0	0	(Jamaica Football Federation) Mount Pleasant
2	DF	Dexter Lembikisa	November 4, 2003 (aged 20)	17	1	(Scottish Football Association) Heart of Midlothian
3	DF	Michael Hector	July 19, 1992 (aged 31)	40	0	(The Football Association) Charlton Athletic
4	DF	Richard King	November 27, 2001 (aged 22)	17	0	(Jamaica Football Federation) Cavalier
5	DF	Ethan Pinnock	May 29, 1993 (aged 31)	10	0	(The Football Association) Brentford
6	DF	Di'Shon Bernard	October 14, 2000 (aged 23)	15	1	(The Football Association) Sheffield Wednesday
7	FW	Demarai Gray	June 28, 1996 (aged 27)	11	5	(Saudi Arabian Football Federation) Al-Ettifaq
8	FW	Kaheim Dixon	October 4, 2004 (aged 19)	3	1	(Jamaica Football Federation) Arnett Gardens
9	FW	Michail Antonio	March 28, 1990 (aged 34)	15	3	(The Football Association) West Ham United
10	MF	Bobby De Cordova-Reid	February 2, 1993 (aged 31)	31	6	(The Football Association) Fulham
11	FW	Shamar Nicholson	February 16, 1997 (aged 27)	47	19	(French Football Federation) Clermont
12	DF	Wes Harding	October 20, 1996 (aged 27)	2	0	(The Football Association) Millwall
13	GK	Coniah Boyce-Clarke	March 1, 2003 (aged 21)	1	0	(The Football Association) Reading
14	MF	Kasey Palmer	November 9, 1996 (aged 27)	6	0	(The Football Association) Coventry City
15	MF	Joel Latibeaudiere	January 6, 2000 (aged 24)	14	0	(The Football Association) Coventry City
16	MF	Karoy Anderson	October 1, 2004 (aged 19)	6	0	(The Football Association) Charlton Athletic
17	DF	Damion Lowe	May 5, 1993 (aged 31)	61	3	(United States Soccer Federation) Philadelphia Union
18	MF	Alex Marshall	February 24, 1998 (aged 26)	14	0	(Jamaica Football Federation) Portmore United
19	MF	Kevon Lambert	March 22, 1997 (aged 27)	27	0	(United States Soccer Federation) San Antonio FC
20	FW	Renaldo Cephas	December 8, 1999 (aged 24)	5	0	(Turkish Football Federation) Ankaragücü
21	DF	Jon Bell	August 26, 1997 (aged 26)	1	0	(United States Soccer Federation) Seattle Sounders FC
22	DF	Greg Leigh	September 30, 1994 (aged 29)	16	1	(The Football Association) Oxford United
23	GK	Jahmali Waite	December 24, 1998 (aged 25)	10	0	(United States Soccer Federation) El Paso Locomotive FC
24	GK	Andre Blake (captain)	November 21, 1990 (aged 33)	72	0	(United States Soccer Federation) Philadelphia Union
25	DF	Amari'i Bell	May 5, 1994 (aged 30)	16	1	(The Football Association) Luton Town

== Group C ==
=== United States ===
The United States announced their 26-man final squad on June 14, 2024.

Head coach: Gregg Berhalter

No.	Pos.	Player	Date of birth (age)	Caps	Goals	Club
1	GK	Matt Turner	June 24, 1994 (aged 29)	41	0	(The Football Association) Nottingham Forest
2	DF	Cameron Carter-Vickers	December 31, 1997 (aged 26)	17	0	(Scottish Football Association) Celtic
3	DF	Chris Richards	March 28, 2000 (aged 24)	18	1	(The Football Association) Crystal Palace
4	MF	Tyler Adams	February 14, 1999 (aged 25)	39	2	(The Football Association) Bournemouth
5	DF	Antonee Robinson	August 8, 1997 (aged 26)	43	4	(The Football Association) Fulham
6	MF	Yunus Musah	November 29, 2002 (aged 21)	37	0	(Italian Football Federation) Milan
7	MF	Giovanni Reyna	November 13, 2002 (aged 21)	28	8	(The Football Association) Nottingham Forest
8	MF	Weston McKennie	August 28, 1998 (aged 25)	53	11	(Italian Football Federation) Juventus
9	FW	Ricardo Pepi	January 9, 2003 (aged 21)	25	10	(Royal Dutch Football Association) PSV Eindhoven
10	FW	Christian Pulisic (captain)	September 18, 1998 (aged 25)	68	29	(Italian Football Federation) Milan
11	MF	Brenden Aaronson	October 22, 2000 (aged 23)	41	8	(German Football Association) Union Berlin
12	DF	Miles Robinson	March 14, 1997 (aged 27)	29	3	(United States Soccer Federation) FC Cincinnati
13	DF	Tim Ream	October 5, 1987 (aged 36)	58	1	(The Football Association) Fulham
14	MF	Luca de la Torre	May 23, 1998 (aged 26)	21	0	(Royal Spanish Football Federation) Celta Vigo
15	MF	Johnny Cardoso	September 20, 2001 (aged 22)	13	0	(Royal Spanish Football Federation) Real Betis
16	DF	Shaq Moore	November 2, 1996 (aged 27)	19	1	(United States Soccer Federation) Nashville SC
17	MF	Malik Tillman	May 28, 2002 (aged 22)	11	0	(Royal Dutch Football Association) PSV Eindhoven
18	GK	Ethan Horvath	June 9, 1995 (aged 29)	9	0	(Football Association of Wales) Cardiff City
19	FW	Haji Wright	March 27, 1998 (aged 26)	10	4	(The Football Association) Coventry City
20	FW	Folarin Balogun	July 3, 2001 (aged 22)	12	3	(French Football Federation) Monaco (Note: Monaco is a Monégasque club playing in the French soccer league system.)
21	FW	Timothy Weah	February 22, 2000 (aged 24)	39	6	(Italian Football Federation) Juventus
22	DF	Joe Scally	December 31, 2002 (aged 21)	11	0	(German Football Association) Borussia Mönchengladbach
23	DF	Kristoffer Lund	May 14, 2002 (aged 22)	3	0	(Italian Football Federation) Palermo
24	DF	Mark McKenzie	February 25, 1999 (aged 25)	13	0	(Royal Belgian Football Association) Genk
25	GK	Sean Johnson	May 31, 1989 (aged 35)	13	0	(Canadian Soccer Association) Toronto FC
26	FW	Josh Sargent	February 20, 2000 (aged 24)	23	5	(The Football Association) Norwich City

=== Uruguay ===
Uruguay announced their 26-man final squad on June 8, 2024.

Head coach: (Argentina) Marcelo Bielsa

No.	Pos.	Player	Date of birth (age)	Caps	Goals	Club
1	GK	Sergio Rochet	March 23, 1993 (aged 31)	19	0	(Brazilian Football Confederation) Internacional
2	DF	José María Giménez	January 20, 1995 (aged 29)	84	8	(Royal Spanish Football Federation) Atlético Madrid
3	DF	Sebastián Cáceres	August 18, 1999 (aged 24)	12	0	(Mexican Football Federation) América
4	DF	Ronald Araújo	March 7, 1999 (aged 25)	16	1	(Royal Spanish Football Federation) Barcelona
5	MF	Manuel Ugarte	April 11, 2001 (aged 23)	16	0	(French Football Federation) Paris Saint-Germain
6	MF	Rodrigo Bentancur	June 25, 1997 (aged 26)	59	1	(The Football Association) Tottenham Hotspur
7	MF	Nicolás de la Cruz	June 1, 1997 (aged 27)	26	5	(Brazilian Football Confederation) Flamengo
8	MF	Nahitan Nández	December 28, 1995 (aged 28)	56	0	(Italian Football Federation) Cagliari
9	FW	Luis Suárez (captain)	January 24, 1987 (aged 37)	138	68	(United States Soccer Federation) Inter Miami CF
10	MF	Giorgian de Arrascaeta	June 1, 1994 (aged 30)	46	10	(Brazilian Football Confederation) Flamengo
11	FW	Facundo Pellistri	December 20, 2001 (aged 22)	20	1	(Royal Spanish Football Federation) Granada
12	GK	Franco Israel	April 22, 2000 (aged 24)	2	0	(Portuguese Football Federation) Sporting CP
13	DF	Guillermo Varela	March 24, 1993 (aged 31)	15	0	(Brazilian Football Confederation) Flamengo
14	FW	Agustín Canobbio	October 1, 1998 (aged 25)	12	1	(Brazilian Football Confederation) Athletico Paranaense
15	MF	Federico Valverde	July 22, 1998 (aged 25)	56	6	(Royal Spanish Football Federation) Real Madrid
16	DF	Mathías Olivera	October 31, 1997 (aged 26)	18	1	(Italian Football Federation) Napoli
17	DF	Matías Viña	November 9, 1997 (aged 26)	36	0	(Brazilian Football Confederation) Flamengo
18	FW	Brian Rodríguez	May 20, 2000 (aged 24)	23	4	(Mexican Football Federation) América
19	FW	Darwin Núñez	June 24, 1999 (aged 24)	23	11	(The Football Association) Liverpool
20	FW	Maximiliano Araújo	February 15, 2000 (aged 24)	8	1	(Mexican Football Federation) Toluca
21	MF	Emiliano Martínez	August 17, 1999 (aged 24)	2	0	(Danish Football Association) Midtjylland
22	DF	Nicolás Marichal	March 17, 2001 (aged 23)	1	0	(Russian Football Union) Dynamo Moscow
23	GK	Santiago Mele	September 6, 1997 (aged 26)	4	0	(Colombian Football Federation) Atlético Junior
24	DF	Lucas Olaza	July 21, 1994 (aged 29)	3	0	(Russian Football Union) Krasnodar
25	FW	Cristian Olivera	April 17, 2002 (aged 22)	3	0	(United States Soccer Federation) Los Angeles FC
26	FW	Brian Ocampo	June 25, 1999 (aged 24)	1	0	(Royal Spanish Football Federation) Cádiz

=== Panama ===
Panama announced their 26-man final squad on June 14, 2024. On June 18, midfielder Aníbal Godoy was ruled out due to an injury.

Head coach: (Spain) Thomas Christiansen

No.	Pos.	Player	Date of birth (age)	Caps	Goals	Club
1	GK	Luis Mejía	March 16, 1991 (aged 33)	51	0	(Uruguayan Football Association) Nacional
2	DF	César Blackman	April 2, 1998 (aged 26)	20	0	(Slovak Football Association) Slovan Bratislava
3	DF	José Córdoba	June 3, 2001 (aged 23)	14	0	(Bulgarian Football Union) Levski Sofia
4	DF	Eduardo Anderson	January 31, 2001 (aged 23)	6	0	(Costa Rican Football Federation) Saprissa
5	MF	Abdiel Ayarza	September 12, 1992 (aged 31)	27	4	(Peruvian Football Federation) Cienciano
6	MF	Cristian Martínez	February 6, 1997 (aged 27)	39	1	(Saudi Arabian Football Federation) Al-Jandal
7	MF	José Luis Rodríguez	June 19, 1998 (aged 26)	47	6	(Portuguese Football Federation) Famalicão
8	MF	Adalberto Carrasquilla	November 28, 1998 (aged 25)	53	2	(United States Soccer Federation) Houston Dynamo FC
9	FW	Eduardo Guerrero	February 21, 2000 (aged 24)	9	0	(Ukrainian Association of Football) Zorya Luhansk
10	MF	Yoel Bárcenas	October 23, 1993 (aged 30)	83	7	(Mexican Football Federation) Mazatlán
11	FW	Ismael Díaz	May 12, 1997 (aged 27)	36	9	(Ecuadorian Football Federation) Universidad Católica
12	GK	César Samudio	March 26, 1994 (aged 30)	3	0	(National Autonomous Federation of Football of Honduras) Marathón
13	MF	Freddy Góndola	September 18, 1995 (aged 28)	18	1	(Israel Football Association) Maccabi Bnei Reineh
14	MF	Jovani Welch	December 7, 1999 (aged 24)	15	1	(Portuguese Football Federation) Académico de Viseu
15	DF	Eric Davis (captain)	March 31, 1991 (aged 33)	87	7	(Slovak Football Association) Košice
16	DF	Carlos Harvey	February 3, 2000 (aged 24)	5	1	(United States Soccer Federation) Minnesota United FC
17	FW	José Fajardo	August 18, 1993 (aged 30)	46	9	(Ecuadorian Football Federation) Universidad Católica
18	DF	Omar Valencia	June 8, 2004 (aged 20)	2	0	(United States Soccer Federation) New York Red Bulls
19	DF	Iván Anderson	November 24, 1997 (aged 26)	11	1	(Colombian Football Federation) Fortaleza
21	MF	César Yanis	January 28, 1996 (aged 28)	44	3	(Costa Rican Football Federation) San Carlos
22	GK	Orlando Mosquera	December 25, 1994 (aged 29)	23	0	(Israel Football Association) Maccabi Tel Aviv
23	DF	Michael Amir Murillo	February 11, 1996 (aged 28)	68	5	(French Football Federation) Marseille
24	DF	Edgardo Fariña	September 21, 2001 (aged 22)	3	0	(National Football Federation of Guatemala) Municipal
25	DF	Roderick Miller	April 3, 1992 (aged 32)	38	2	(Association of Football Federations of Azerbaijan) Turan Tovuz
26	MF	Kahiser Lenis	July 23, 2000 (aged 23)	3	2	(Colombian Football Federation) Jaguares

=== Bolivia ===
Bolivia announced a reduced provisional list of 29 players plus 2 invited players on June 2, 2024. On June 3, defender Efrain Morales declined the call-up due to personal issues and was replaced by César Romero. On June 9, it was announced that Moisés Paniagua would not make the squad due to one of his parents failing to obtain a US visa in time for the competition. The final squad was announced on June 17, 2024.

Head coach: (Brazil) Antônio Carlos Zago

No.	Pos.	Player	Date of birth (age)	Caps	Goals	Club
1	GK	Carlos Lampe	March 17, 1987 (aged 37)	55	0	(Bolivian Football Federation) Bolívar
2	DF	Jesús Sagredo	March 10, 1994 (aged 30)	9	0	(Bolivian Football Federation) Bolívar
3	DF	Diego Medina	January 13, 2002 (aged 22)	13	0	(Bolivian Football Federation) Always Ready
4	DF	Luis Haquín (captain)	November 15, 1997 (aged 26)	34	1	(Brazilian Football Confederation) Ponte Preta
5	DF	Adrián Jusino	July 9, 1992 (aged 31)	36	0	(Bolivian Football Federation) The Strongest
6	MF	Leonel Justiniano	July 2, 1992 (aged 31)	50	2	(Bolivian Football Federation) Bolívar
7	MF	Miguel Terceros	April 25, 2004 (aged 20)	12	1	(Brazilian Football Confederation) Santos
8	FW	Jaume Cuéllar	August 23, 2001 (aged 22)	8	0	(Royal Spanish Football Federation) Barcelona
9	FW	César Menacho	August 9, 1999 (aged 24)	4	0	(Bolivian Football Federation) Blooming
10	MF	Ramiro Vaca	July 1, 1999 (aged 24)	34	4	(Bolivian Football Federation) Bolívar
11	FW	Carmelo Algarañaz	January 27, 1996 (aged 28)	23	2	(Bolivian Football Federation) Bolívar
12	GK	Gustavo Almada	April 29, 1994 (aged 30)	0	0	(Bolivian Football Federation) Universitario de Vinto
13	MF	Lucas Chávez	April 17, 2003 (aged 21)	3	0	(Bolivian Football Federation) Bolívar
14	MF	Robson Tomé	May 18, 2002 (aged 22)	2	0	(Bolivian Football Federation) Always Ready
15	MF	Gabriel Villamil	June 28, 2001 (aged 22)	17	0	(Ecuadorian Football Federation) LDU Quito
16	MF	Boris Céspedes	June 19, 1995 (aged 29)	17	1	(Swiss Football Association) Yverdon-Sport
17	DF	Roberto Fernández	July 12, 1999 (aged 24)	35	1	(Russian Football Union) Baltika Kaliningrad
18	MF	Rodrigo Ramallo	October 14, 1990 (aged 33)	40	7	(Bolivian Football Federation) The Strongest
19	FW	Bruno Miranda	February 10, 1998 (aged 26)	18	2	(Bolivian Football Federation) The Strongest
20	MF	Fernando Saucedo	March 15, 1990 (aged 34)	24	1	(Bolivian Football Federation) Bolívar
21	DF	José Sagredo	March 10, 1994 (aged 30)	54	1	(Bolivian Football Federation) Bolívar
22	MF	Héctor Cuéllar	August 16, 2000 (aged 23)	8	0	(Bolivian Football Federation) Always Ready
23	GK	Guillermo Viscarra	February 7, 1993 (aged 31)	21	0	(Bolivian Football Federation) The Strongest
24	DF	Marcelo Suárez	August 29, 2001 (aged 22)	8	0	(Bolivian Football Federation) Always Ready
25	DF	Yomar Rocha	June 21, 2003 (aged 20)	3	0	(Bolivian Football Federation) Bolívar
26	MF	Adalid Terrazas	August 25, 2000 (aged 23)	0	0	(Bolivian Football Federation) Always Ready

== Group D ==
=== Brazil ===
Brazil announced their original 23-man final squad on May 10, 2024. The final squad was completed by adding three players, after CONMEBOL decided to expand the final lists to 26 players. Additionally, goalkeeper Ederson was replaced by Rafael due to injury.

Head coach: Dorival Júnior

No.	Pos.	Player	Date of birth (age)	Caps	Goals	Club
1	GK	Alisson	October 2, 1992 (aged 31)	65	0	(The Football Association) Liverpool
2	DF	Danilo (captain)	July 15, 1991 (aged 32)	57	1	(Italian Football Federation) Juventus
3	DF	Éder Militão	January 18, 1998 (aged 26)	31	2	(Royal Spanish Football Federation) Real Madrid
4	DF	Marquinhos	May 14, 1994 (aged 30)	85	7	(French Football Federation) Paris Saint-Germain
5	MF	Bruno Guimarães	November 16, 1997 (aged 26)	22	1	(The Football Association) Newcastle United
6	DF	Wendell	July 20, 1993 (aged 30)	3	0	(Portuguese Football Federation) Porto
7	FW	Vinícius Júnior	July 12, 2000 (aged 23)	30	3	(Royal Spanish Football Federation) Real Madrid
8	MF	Lucas Paquetá	August 27, 1997 (aged 26)	46	10	(The Football Association) West Ham United
9	FW	Endrick	July 21, 2006 (aged 17)	6	3	(Brazilian Football Confederation) Palmeiras
10	FW	Rodrygo	January 9, 2001 (aged 23)	23	6	(Royal Spanish Football Federation) Real Madrid
11	FW	Raphinha	December 14, 1996 (aged 27)	23	6	(Royal Spanish Football Federation) Barcelona
12	GK	Bento	June 10, 1999 (aged 25)	2	0	(Brazilian Football Confederation) Athletico Paranaense
13	DF	Yan Couto	June 3, 2002 (aged 22)	4	0	(Royal Spanish Football Federation) Girona
14	DF	Gabriel Magalhães	December 19, 1997 (aged 26)	6	1	(The Football Association) Arsenal
15	MF	João Gomes	February 12, 2001 (aged 23)	4	0	(The Football Association) Wolverhampton Wanderers
16	DF	Guilherme Arana	April 1, 1997 (aged 27)	7	0	(Brazilian Football Confederation) Atlético Mineiro
17	DF	Lucas Beraldo	November 24, 2003 (aged 20)	3	0	(French Football Federation) Paris Saint-Germain
18	MF	Douglas Luiz	May 9, 1998 (aged 26)	15	0	(The Football Association) Aston Villa
19	MF	Andreas Pereira	January 1, 1996 (aged 28)	5	1	(The Football Association) Fulham
20	FW	Savinho	April 10, 2004 (aged 20)	3	0	(Royal Spanish Football Federation) Girona
21	FW	Evanilson	October 6, 1999 (aged 24)	1	0	(Portuguese Football Federation) Porto
22	FW	Gabriel Martinelli	June 18, 2001 (aged 23)	11	2	(The Football Association) Arsenal
23	GK	Rafael	June 23, 1989 (aged 34)	0	0	(Brazilian Football Confederation) São Paulo
24	MF	Éderson	July 7, 1999 (aged 24)	1	0	(Italian Football Federation) Atalanta
25	DF	Bremer	March 18, 1997 (aged 27)	5	0	(Italian Football Federation) Juventus
26	FW	Pepê	February 24, 1997 (aged 27)	2	0	(Portuguese Football Federation) Porto

=== Colombia ===
Colombia announced their 26-man final squad on June 14, 2024.

Head coach: (Argentina) Néstor Lorenzo

No.	Pos.	Player	Date of birth (age)	Caps	Goals	Club
1	GK	David Ospina	August 31, 1988 (aged 35)	128	0	(Saudi Arabian Football Federation) Al Nassr
2	DF	Carlos Cuesta	March 9, 1999 (aged 25)	14	0	(Royal Belgian Football Association) Genk
3	DF	Jhon Lucumí	June 26, 1998 (aged 25)	19	0	(Italian Football Federation) Bologna
4	DF	Santiago Arias	January 13, 1992 (aged 32)	57	0	(Brazilian Football Confederation) Bahia
5	MF	Kevin Castaño	September 29, 2000 (aged 23)	9	0	(Russian Football Union) Krasnodar
6	MF	Richard Ríos	June 2, 2000 (aged 24)	7	1	(Brazilian Football Confederation) Palmeiras
7	FW	Luis Díaz	January 13, 1997 (aged 27)	49	12	(The Football Association) Liverpool
8	MF	Jorge Carrascal	May 25, 1998 (aged 26)	14	2	(Russian Football Union) Dynamo Moscow
9	FW	Miguel Borja	January 26, 1993 (aged 31)	28	8	(Argentine Football Association) River Plate
10	MF	James Rodríguez (captain)	July 12, 1991 (aged 32)	100	27	(Brazilian Football Confederation) São Paulo
11	MF	Jhon Arias	September 21, 1997 (aged 26)	15	3	(Brazilian Football Confederation) Fluminense
12	GK	Camilo Vargas	March 9, 1989 (aged 35)	23	0	(Mexican Football Federation) Atlas
13	DF	Yerry Mina	September 24, 1994 (aged 29)	44	7	(Italian Football Federation) Cagliari
14	FW	Jhon Durán	December 13, 2003 (aged 20)	9	1	(The Football Association) Aston Villa
15	MF	Mateus Uribe	March 21, 1991 (aged 33)	55	6	(Qatar Football Association) Al Sadd
16	MF	Jefferson Lerma	October 25, 1994 (aged 29)	43	1	(The Football Association) Crystal Palace
17	DF	Johan Mojica	August 21, 1992 (aged 31)	25	1	(Royal Spanish Football Federation) Osasuna
18	FW	Luis Sinisterra	June 17, 1999 (aged 25)	13	4	(The Football Association) Bournemouth
19	FW	Rafael Santos Borré	September 15, 1995 (aged 28)	33	6	(Brazilian Football Confederation) Internacional
20	MF	Juan Fernando Quintero	January 18, 1993 (aged 31)	35	4	(Argentine Football Association) Racing
21	DF	Daniel Muñoz	May 26, 1996 (aged 28)	27	1	(The Football Association) Crystal Palace
22	MF	Yáser Asprilla	November 19, 2003 (aged 20)	5	2	(The Football Association) Watford
23	DF	Davinson Sánchez	June 12, 1996 (aged 28)	59	1	(Turkish Football Federation) Galatasaray
24	FW	Jhon Córdoba	May 11, 1993 (aged 31)	4	2	(Russian Football Union) Krasnodar
25	GK	Álvaro Montero	March 29, 1995 (aged 29)	8	0	(Colombian Football Federation) Millonarios
26	DF	Deiver Machado	September 2, 1992 (aged 31)	10	0	(French Football Federation) Lens

=== Paraguay ===
Paraguay announced their 26-man final squad on June 15, 2024.

Head coach: (Argentina) Daniel Garnero

No.	Pos.	Player	Date of birth (age)	Caps	Goals	Club
1	GK	Carlos Coronel	December 29, 1996 (aged 27)	9	0	(United States Soccer Federation) New York Red Bulls
2	DF	Iván Ramírez	December 8, 1994 (aged 29)	6	0	(Paraguayan Football Association) Libertad
3	DF	Omar Alderete	December 26, 1996 (aged 27)	17	0	(Royal Spanish Football Federation) Getafe
4	DF	Matías Espinoza	September 19, 1997 (aged 26)	4	0	(Paraguayan Football Association) Libertad
5	DF	Fabián Balbuena	August 23, 1991 (aged 32)	39	2	(Russian Football Union) Dynamo Moscow
6	DF	Júnior Alonso	February 9, 1993 (aged 31)	54	2	(Russian Football Union) Krasnodar
7	FW	Derlis González	March 20, 1994 (aged 30)	51	9	(Paraguayan Football Association) Olimpia
8	MF	Damián Bobadilla	July 11, 2001 (aged 22)	1	0	(Brazilian Football Confederation) São Paulo
9	FW	Adam Bareiro	July 26, 1996 (aged 27)	6	0	(Argentine Football Association) San Lorenzo
10	MF	Miguel Almirón	February 10, 1994 (aged 30)	55	7	(The Football Association) Newcastle United
11	FW	Ángel Romero	July 4, 1992 (aged 31)	43	8	(Brazilian Football Confederation) Corinthians
12	GK	Alfredo Aguilar	July 18, 1988 (aged 35)	3	0	(Paraguayan Football Association) Sportivo Luqueño
13	DF	Néstor Giménez	July 24, 1997 (aged 26)	2	0	(Paraguayan Football Association) Libertad
14	MF	Andrés Cubas	May 22, 1996 (aged 28)	19	0	(Canadian Soccer Association) Vancouver Whitecaps FC
15	DF	Gustavo Gómez (captain)	May 6, 1993 (aged 31)	74	4	(Brazilian Football Confederation) Palmeiras
16	MF	Matías Rojas	November 3, 1995 (aged 28)	19	1	(United States Soccer Federation) Inter Miami CF
17	MF	Kaku	January 11, 1995 (aged 29)	20	5	(United Arab Emirates Football Association) Al Ain
18	FW	Álex Arce	June 16, 1995 (aged 29)	3	0	(Ecuadorian Football Federation) LDU Quito
19	FW	Julio Enciso	January 23, 2004 (aged 20)	14	0	(The Football Association) Brighton & Hove Albion
20	MF	Richard Sánchez	March 29, 1996 (aged 28)	34	1	(Mexican Football Federation) América
21	MF	Fabrizio Peralta	August 2, 2002 (aged 21)	1	0	(Paraguayan Football Association) Cerro Porteño
22	GK	Rodrigo Morínigo	October 7, 1998 (aged 25)	0	0	(Paraguayan Football Association) Libertad
23	MF	Mathías Villasanti	January 24, 1997 (aged 27)	37	0	(Brazilian Football Confederation) Grêmio
24	FW	Ramón Sosa	August 31, 1999 (aged 24)	10	0	(Argentine Football Association) Talleres
25	DF	Gustavo Velázquez	April 17, 1991 (aged 33)	2	1	(Argentine Football Association) Newell's Old Boys
26	MF	Hernesto Caballero	April 9, 1991 (aged 33)	3	0	(Paraguayan Football Association) Libertad

=== Costa Rica ===
Costa Rica announced their 26-man final squad on June 11, 2024.

Head coach: (Argentina) Gustavo Alfaro

No.	Pos.	Player	Date of birth (age)	Caps	Goals	Club
1	GK	Kevin Chamorro	April 8, 2000 (aged 24)	11	0	(Costa Rican Football Federation) Saprissa
2	DF	Gerald Taylor	May 28, 2001 (aged 23)	5	1	(Costa Rican Football Federation) Saprissa
3	DF	Jeyland Mitchell	September 29, 2004 (aged 19)	4	0	(Costa Rican Football Federation) Alajuelense
4	DF	Juan Pablo Vargas	June 6, 1995 (aged 29)	22	3	(Colombian Football Federation) Millonarios
5	DF	Fernán Faerrón	August 22, 2000 (aged 23)	2	0	(Costa Rican Football Federation) Herediano
6	DF	Julio Cascante	October 3, 1993 (aged 30)	8	1	(United States Soccer Federation) Austin FC
7	FW	Anthony Contreras	January 29, 2000 (aged 24)	27	4	(Cyprus Football Association) Pafos
8	DF	Joseph Mora	January 15, 1993 (aged 31)	9	0	(Costa Rican Football Federation) Saprissa
9	FW	Manfred Ugalde	May 25, 2002 (aged 22)	10	3	(Russian Football Union) Spartak Moscow
10	MF	Brandon Aguilera	June 28, 2003 (aged 20)	16	0	(The Football Association) Bristol Rovers
11	MF	Ariel Lassiter	September 27, 1994 (aged 29)	21	1	(Canadian Soccer Association) CF Montréal
12	FW	Joel Campbell	June 26, 1992 (aged 31)	139	27	(Costa Rican Football Federation) Alajuelense
13	MF	Jefferson Brenes	April 13, 1997 (aged 27)	12	1	(Costa Rican Football Federation) Saprissa
14	MF	Orlando Galo	August 11, 2000 (aged 23)	16	3	(Costa Rican Football Federation) Herediano
15	DF	Francisco Calvo (captain)	July 8, 1992 (aged 31)	93	11	(Mexican Football Federation) Juárez
16	MF	Alejandro Bran	March 5, 2001 (aged 23)	6	0	(United States Soccer Federation) Minnesota United FC
17	FW	Warren Madrigal	July 24, 2004 (aged 19)	12	1	(Costa Rican Football Federation) Saprissa
18	GK	Aarón Cruz	May 25, 1991 (aged 33)	4	0	(Costa Rican Football Federation) Herediano
19	FW	Kenneth Vargas	April 17, 2002 (aged 22)	6	0	(Scottish Football Association) Heart of Midlothian
20	FW	Josimar Alcócer	July 7, 2004 (aged 19)	11	1	(Royal Belgian Football Association) Westerlo
21	FW	Álvaro Zamora	March 9, 2002 (aged 22)	11	1	(Hellenic Football Federation) Aris
22	DF	Haxzel Quirós	June 3, 1998 (aged 26)	7	0	(Costa Rican Football Federation) Herediano
23	GK	Patrick Sequeira	March 1, 1999 (aged 25)	5	0	(Royal Spanish Football Federation) Ibiza
24	FW	Andy Rojas	December 5, 2005 (aged 18)	1	1	(Costa Rican Football Federation) Herediano
25	DF	Yeison Molina	January 25, 1996 (aged 28)	1	0	(Costa Rican Football Federation) Guanacasteca
26	DF	Douglas Sequeira	September 16, 2003 (aged 20)	0	0	(Costa Rican Football Federation) Saprissa

== Statistics ==
=== Age ===
All ages are as of June 20, 2024, the opening day of the tournament.

==== Players ====
- Oldest: (Chile) Claudio Bravo (41 years, 68 days)
- Youngest: (Ecuador) Kendry Páez (17 years, 47 days)

==== Goalkeepers ====
- Oldest: (Chile) Claudio Bravo (41 years, 68 days)
- Youngest: (Jamaica) Coniah Boyce-Clarke (21 years, 111 days)

==== Coaches ====
- Oldest: (Uruguay) Jorge Fossati (71 years, 211 days)
- Youngest: (Mexico) Jaime Lozano (45 years, 265 days)

=== Caps ===
- The tournament featured 16 players with at least 100 international caps for their country:
  - 182 caps – (Argentina) Lionel Messi
  - 163 caps – (Chile) Alexis Sánchez
  - 148 caps – (Chile) Claudio Bravo
  - 140 caps – (Argentina) Ángel Di María
  - 139 caps – (Costa Rica) Joel Campbell
  - 139 caps – (Chile) Mauricio Isla
  - 138 caps – (Uruguay) Luis Suárez
  - 132 caps – (Venezuela) Tomás Rincón
  - 128 caps – (Colombia) David Ospina
  - 119 caps – (Peru) Paolo Guerrero
  - 118 caps – (Peru) Luis Advíncula
  - 112 caps – (Argentina) Nicolás Otamendi
  - 109 caps – (Chile) Eduardo Vargas
  - 106 caps – (Peru) Pedro Gallese
  - 104 caps – (Venezuela) Salomón Rondón
  - 100 caps – (Colombia) James Rodríguez

=== Player representation by league system ===
Nations in bold were represented by their national teams in the tournament.

Players	Clubs
56	England
42	**United States**
36	**Brazil**
35	**Mexico**
29	Spain
22	Italy
20	**Bolivia**
16	**Argentina**; **Costa Rica**
14	Portugal
12	France
11	**Ecuador**; **Peru**; Russia
9	**Canada**; **Colombia**
7	**Chile**; **Paraguay**
6	Belgium; Germany
5	Netherlands; Scotland
4	**Jamaica**; Saudi Arabia
3	Denmark; Turkey
2	Cyprus; Greece; Guatemala; Israel; Slovakia; Sweden
1	Azerbaijan; Czech Republic; Honduras; Poland; Qatar; Switzerland; Ukraine; United Arab Emirates; **Uruguay**; **Venezuela**

=== Player representation by club ===
Players	Clubs
9	(Bolivia) Bolívar
7	(Costa Rica) Saprissa (Mexico) América
5	(Bolivia) Always Ready (Brazil) Flamengo (Costa Rica) Herediano (England) Fulham (Paraguay) Libertad (Peru) Universitario (Portugal) Porto
4	(Bolivia) The Strongest (Brazil) São Paulo (Canada) CF Montréal (Chile) Colo-Colo (Ecuador) Universidad Católica (England) Liverpool (Spain) Girona (Spain) Real Betis (Spain) Real Madrid (Italy) Juventus (Mexico) Pachuca (Mexico) UNAM (Russia) Dynamo Moscow (Russia) Krasnodar (United States) Minnesota United FC

Clubs with fewer than 4 players:
Players	Clubs
3	(Argentina) River Plate (Argentina) Talleres (Brazil) Atlético Mineiro (Brazil) Internacional (Brazil) Palmeiras (Canada) Toronto FC (Ecuador) Independiente del Valle (Ecuador) LDU Quito (England) Aston Villa (England) Coventry City (England) Crystal Palace (England) Norwich City (England) Tottenham Hotspur (England) West Ham United (Spain) Atlético Madrid (Spain) Barcelona (France) Paris Saint-Germain (Italy) Cagliari (Italy) Inter Milan (Mexico) Atlas (Mexico) Guadalajara (Mexico) Monterrey (Mexico) Toluca (United States) Inter Miami CF (United States) Philadelphia Union (United States) Portland Timbers
2	(Argentina) Huracán (Argentina) Racing (Belgium) Genk (Brazil) Athletico Paranaense (Brazil) Corinthians (Brazil) Cruzeiro (Brazil) Fortaleza (Brazil) Grêmio (Brazil) Santos (Canada) Vancouver Whitecaps FC (Colombia) Millonarios (Costa Rica) Alajuelense (Denmark) Midtjylland (England) Arsenal (England) Bournemouth (England) Brighton & Hove Albion (England) Charlton Athletic (England) Chelsea (England) Manchester United (England) Newcastle United (England) Nottingham Forest (England) Watford (Spain) Cádiz (Spain) Sevilla (France) Monaco (France) Toulouse (Germany) Bayer Leverkusen (Italy) Milan (Italy) Fiorentina (Mexico) Cruz Azul (Mexico) Mazatlán (Netherlands) Feyenoord (Netherlands) PSV Eindhoven (Peru) Alianza Lima (Portugal) Famalicão (Portugal) Benfica (Scotland) Celtic (Scotland) Heart of Midlothian (Sweden) Malmö FF (United States) Austin FC (United States) Nashville SC (United States) New York Red Bulls (United States) Orlando City SC
1	(Argentina) Belgrano (Argentina) Boca Juniors (Argentina) Godoy Cruz (Argentina) Independiente (Argentina) Newell's Old Boys (Argentina) San Lorenzo (Azerbaijan) Turan Tovuz (Belgium) Cercle Brugge (Belgium) Club Brugge (Belgium) Union Saint-Gilloise (Belgium) Westerlo (Bolivia) Blooming (Bolivia) Universitario de Vinto (Brazil) Bahia (Brazil) Botafogo (Brazil) Criciúma (Brazil) Fluminense (Brazil) Ponte Preta (Brazil) Red Bull Bragantino; Audax Italiano; Unión La Calera; Universidad de Chile (Colombia) Águilas Doradas (Colombia) América de Cali (Colombia) Atlético Nacional (Colombia) Fortaleza (Colombia) Jaguares (Colombia) Atlético Junior (Costa Rica) Guanacasteca (Costa Rica) San Carlos (Cyprus) Pafos (Cyprus) Anorthosis Famagusta (Czech Republic) Sparta Prague (Denmark) Silkeborg (Ecuador) Barcelona (Ecuador) Emelec (England) Brentford (England) Ipswich Town (England) Luton Town (England) Manchester City (England) Millwall (England) Oxford United (England) Preston North End (England) Reading (England) Sheffield United (England) Sheffield Wednesday (England) Wolverhampton Wanderers (Spain) Almería (Spain) Celta Vigo (Spain) Getafe (Spain) Granada (Spain) Ibiza (Spain) Mallorca (Spain) Osasuna (Spain) Real Sociedad (France) Clermont (France) Lens (France) Lille (France) Lyon (France) Marseille (Germany) Bayern Munich (Germany) Borussia Dortmund (Germany) Borussia Mönchengladbach (Germany) Eintracht Frankfurt (Germany) Union Berlin (Greece) AEK Athens (Greece) Aris (Guatemala) Municipal (Guatemala) Xelajú (Honduras) Marathón (Israel) Maccabi Bnei Reineh (Italy) Atalanta (Italy) Bologna (Italy) Genoa (Italy) Monza (Italy) Napoli (Italy) Palermo (Italy) Parma (Italy) Roma (Israel) Maccabi Tel Aviv (Jamaica) Arnett Gardens (Jamaica) Cavalier (Jamaica) Mount Pleasant (Jamaica) Portmore United (Saudi Arabia) Al-Ettifaq (Saudi Arabia) Al-Jandal (Saudi Arabia) Al-Qadsiah (Saudi Arabia) Al Nassr (Mexico) Juárez (Mexico) León (Mexico) Santos Laguna (Mexico) UANL (Netherlands) Ajax (Paraguay) Olimpia (Paraguay) Sportivo Luqueño (Peru) Cienciano (Peru) Melgar (Peru) Sporting Cristal (Peru) Universidad César Vallejo (Poland) Raków Częstochowa (Portugal) Académico de Viseu (Portugal) Casa Pia (Portugal) Gil Vicente (Portugal) Sporting CP (Portugal) Vizela (Qatar) Al Sadd (Russia) Baltika Kaliningrad (Russia) CSKA Moscow (Russia) Spartak Moscow (Scotland) Motherwell (Slovakia) Košice (Slovakia) Slovan Bratislava (Turkey) Ankaragücü (Turkey) Galatasaray (Turkey) Kasımpaşa (Switzerland) Yverdon-Sport (Ukraine) Zorya Luhansk (United Arab Emirates) Al Ain (United States) Atlanta United FC (United States) Colorado Rapids (United States) El Paso Locomotive FC (United States) FC Cincinnati (United States) Houston Dynamo FC (United States) Los Angeles FC (United States) Real Salt Lake (United States) San Jose Earthquakes (United States) Seattle Sounders FC (United States) St. Louis City SC (Uruguay) Nacional (Venezuela) Metropolitanos (Wales) Cardiff City; Free Agent

=== Coaches representation by country ===
Coaches in bold represented their own country.

Number	Country	Coaches
7	Argentina	Gustavo Alfaro (Costa Rica), Fernando Batista (Venezuela), Marcelo Bielsa (Uruguay), Ricardo Gareca (Chile), Daniel Garnero (Paraguay), Néstor Lorenzo (Colombia), **Lionel Scaloni**
2	Brazil	Antônio Carlos Zago (Bolivia), **Dorival Júnior**
2	Spain	Thomas Christiansen (Panama), Félix Sánchez (Ecuador)
2	United States	**Gregg Berhalter**, Jesse Marsch (Canada)
1	Iceland	Heimir Hallgrímsson (Jamaica)
1	Mexico	**Jaime Lozano**
1	Uruguay	Jorge Fossati (Peru)
