= 2024 Copa América Group D =

Soccer tournament group

Group D of the 2024 Copa América was one of four groups in the first stage of the tournament. The tournament involves national teams from CONMEBOL (South America) but also includes invited teams from the CONCACAF region (North, Central America and the Caribbean), that qualified via the 2023–24 CONCACAF Nations League.

The group was made up of Brazil, Colombia and Paraguay, all three from CONMEBOL, and Costa Rica from CONCACAF. The draw for the groups was conducted on December 7, 2023, with Brazil being previously seeded into the group. The group's matches took place from June 24 to July 2 at six venues in six U.S. cities.

The top two teams, following a round-robin of three matches per team, advanced to the quarter-finals.

== Teams ==
Draw position	Team	Pot	Confederation	Method of qualification	Appearances		Previous best performance	FIFA Rankings	
Draw position	Team	Pot	Confederation	Method of qualification	Total	Last	Previous best performance	November 2023 (Note: The rankings of November 2023 were used for seeding for the final draw, except for certain cases.)	June 2024
D1 (seed)	Brazil	1	CONMEBOL	Automatic qualifier	38th	2021	Winners (Nine times, last in 2019)	5	4
D2	Colombia	2	CONMEBOL	Automatic qualifier	24th	2021	Winners (2001)	15	12
D3	Paraguay	3	CONMEBOL	Automatic qualifier	39th	2021	Winners (1953 and 1979)	53	58
D4	Costa Rica	4 (Note: As the identity of the CONCACAF 6 team was not known at the time of the groups draw, positions in the FIFA Rankings were not taken into account, and the placeholder in the draw was automatically seeded into pot 4.)	CONCACAF	CONCACAF play-in round winners	6th	2016	Quarterfinals (2001 and 2004)	52	52

== Standings ==
Pos	Team	Pld	W	D	L	GF	GA	GD	Pts	Qualification
1	Colombia	3	2	1	0	6	2	+4	7	Advance to knockout stage
2	Brazil	3	1	2	0	5	2	+3	5	Advance to knockout stage
3	Costa Rica	3	1	1	1	2	4	−2	4	
4	Paraguay	3	0	0	3	3	8	−5	0	

Source: CONMEBOL
Rules for classification: Tiebreakers

In the quarter-finals:

- The winners of Group D, Colombia, advanced to play the runners-up of Group C, Panama.
- The runners-up of Group D, Brazil, advanced to play the winners of Group C, Uruguay.

== Matches ==
All kick-off times are local times, as listed by CONMEBOL.

=== Colombia vs Paraguay ===
The two teams had faced each other in 49 previous matches, including 11 times in the Copa América with an even record of five wins per side and one draw. Their most recent meeting was a 1–0 away win for Colombia in the 2026 FIFA World Cup qualification in November 2023.

June 24, 2024
5:00 pm CDT (UTC−5)

Colombia	2–1	Paraguay
Muñoz 32'; Lerma 42'	Report (CONMEBOL); Report (CONCACAF)	Enciso 69'

NRG Stadium, Houston, Texas
Attendance: 67,059
Referee: Darío Herrera (Argentina)

Colombia	Paraguay

GK	12	Camilo Vargas
RB	21	Daniel Muñoz
CB	23	Davinson Sánchez
CB	3	Jhon Lucumí		(substituted off) 25'
LB	17	Johan Mojica
CM	6	Richard Ríos
CM	16	Jefferson Lerma	(yellow card) 14'	(substituted off) 68'
CM	11	Jhon Arias		(substituted off) 90+2'
RF	10	James Rodríguez (c)		(substituted off) 90+1'
CF	19	Rafael Santos Borré		(substituted off) 68'
LF	7	Luis Díaz
Substitutions:
DF	13	Yerry Mina		(substituted on) 25'
MF	15	Mateus Uribe		(substituted on) 68'
FW	24	Jhon Córdoba		(substituted on) 68'
MF	20	Juan Fernando Quintero		(substituted on) 90+1'
MF	5	Kevin Castaño		(substituted on) 90+2'
Manager:
(Argentina) Néstor Lorenzo

GK	22	Rodrigo Morínigo
RB	25	Gustavo Velázquez	(yellow card) 54'
CB	5	Fabián Balbuena (c)
CB	3	Omar Alderete
LB	4	Matías Espinoza
CM	23	Mathías Villasanti		(substituted off) 80'
CM	14	Andrés Cubas	(yellow card) 78'
CM	26	Hernesto Caballero		(substituted off) 58'
RF	10	Miguel Almirón		(substituted off) 59'
CF	18	Alex Arce		(substituted off) 79'
LF	19	Julio Enciso		(substituted off) 90+2'
Substitutions:
MF	8	Damián Bobadilla		(substituted on) 58'
FW	24	Ramón Sosa		(substituted on) 59'
FW	9	Adam Bareiro		(substituted on) 79'
FW	11	Ángel Romero		(substituted on) 80'
MF	16	Matías Rojas		(substituted on) 90+2'
Manager:
(Argentina) Daniel Garnero			(yellow card) 90+4'

Man of the Match:
James Rodríguez (Colombia)

Assistant referees:
Juan Belatti (Argentina)
Cristian Navarro (Argentina)
Fourth official:
Ivo Méndez (Bolivia)
Fifth official:
José Antelo (Bolivia)
Video assistant referee:
Silvio Trucco (Argentina)
Assistant video assistant referee:
Rodrigo Carvajal (Chile)

=== Brazil vs Costa Rica ===
The two teams had met 11 times previously with Brazil dominating with 10 wins to just one victory for Costa Rica. Two of those Brazilians wins came in Copa America group stage matches: 5–0 in 1997 and 4–1 in 2004. Their last meeting had been in the 2018 FIFA World Cup with Brazil claiming a 2–0 group stage victory.

June 24, 2024
6:00 pm PDT (UTC−7)

Brazil	0–0	Costa Rica
	Report (CONMEBOL); Report (CONCACAF)

SoFi Stadium, Inglewood, California
Attendance: 67,158
Referee: César Ramos (Mexico)

Brazil	Costa Rica

GK	1	Alisson
RB	2	Danilo (c)
CB	3	Éder Militão	(yellow card) 80'
CB	4	Marquinhos
LB	16	Guilherme Arana
CM	5	Bruno Guimarães
CM	15	João Gomes		(substituted off) 70'
RW	11	Raphinha		(substituted off) 83'
AM	8	Lucas Paquetá
LW	10	Rodrygo
CF	7	Vinícius Júnior		(substituted off) 69'
Substitutions:
FW	9	Endrick		(substituted on) 69'
FW	20	Savinho		(substituted on) 70'
FW	22	Gabriel Martinelli		(substituted on) 83'
Manager:
Dorival Júnior

GK	23	Patrick Sequeira
CB	3	Jeyland Mitchell
CB	4	Juan Pablo Vargas
CB	15	Francisco Calvo (c)	(yellow card) 54'
RWB	22	Haxzel Quirós
LWB	11	Ariel Lassiter		(substituted off) 90+2'
CM	14	Orlando Galo
CM	13	Jefferson Brenes		(substituted off) 63'
CM	10	Brandon Aguilera		(substituted off) 90+2'
CF	21	Álvaro Zamora		(substituted off) 69'
CF	9	Manfred Ugalde	(yellow card) 58'	(substituted off) 64'
Substitutions:
MF	16	Alejandro Bran		(substituted on) 63'
FW	17	Warren Madrigal		(substituted on) 64'
FW	12	Joel Campbell		(substituted on) 69'
DF	8	Joseph Mora		(substituted on) 90+2'
DF	2	Gerald Taylor		(substituted on) 90+2'
Manager:
(Argentina) Gustavo Alfaro

Man of the Match:
Patrick Sequeira (Costa Rica)

Assistant referees:
Alberto Morín (Mexico)
Marco Bisguerra (Mexico)
Fourth official:
Alexis Herrera (Venezuela)
Fifth official:
Alberto Ponte (Venezuela)
Video assistant referee:
Guillermo Pacheco (Mexico)
Assistant video assistant referee:
Erik Miranda (Mexico)

=== Colombia vs Costa Rica ===
The two teams had met 13 times previously, including four matches at the Copa América with three wins for Colombia; 4–1 and 1–0 in the group stage of the 1997 and 2011 editions and 2–0 in the quarterfinals in 2004; and a 3–2 win for Costa Rica in the group stage of the Copa América Centenario in 2016. Their most recent meeting was a friendly game won 3–1 by Colombia in October 2018.

June 28, 2024
3:00 pm MST (UTC−7)

Colombia	3–0	Costa Rica
Díaz 31' (pen.); Sánchez 59'; Córdoba 62'	Report (CONMEBOL); Report (CONCACAF)

State Farm Stadium, Glendale, Arizona
Attendance: 27,386
Referee: Gustavo Tejera (Uruguay)

Colombia	Costa Rica

GK	12	Camilo Vargas
RB	21	Daniel Muñoz
CB	23	Davinson Sánchez
CB	2	Carlos Cuesta
LB	17	Johan Mojica
CM	6	Richard Ríos	(yellow card) 41'	(substituted off) 46'
CM	16	Jefferson Lerma		(substituted off) 71'
CM	11	Jhon Arias
RF	10	James Rodríguez (c)		(substituted off) 71'
CF	24	Jhon Córdoba	(yellow card) 64'	(substituted off) 77'
LF	7	Luis Díaz		(substituted off) 77'
Substitutions:
MF	15	Mateus Uribe		(substituted on) 46'
MF	5	Kevin Castaño		(substituted on) 71'
MF	22	Yáser Asprilla		(substituted on) 71'
FW	19	Rafael Santos Borré		(substituted on) 77'
MF	14	Jhon Durán		(substituted on) 77'
Manager:
(Argentina) Néstor Lorenzo

GK	23	Patrick Sequeira
CB	3	Jeyland Mitchell
CB	4	Juan Pablo Vargas
CB	15	Francisco Calvo (c)
RM	22	Haxzel Quirós
CM	14	Orlando Galo
CM	10	Brandon Aguilera		(substituted off) 66'
LM	11	Ariel Lassiter		(substituted off) 46'
AM	21	Álvaro Zamora		(substituted off) 66'
AM	17	Warren Madrigal		(substituted off) 83'
CF	9	Manfred Ugalde	(yellow card) 17'	(substituted off) 46'
Substitutions:
DF	8	Joseph Mora		(substituted on) 46'
FW	12	Joel Campbell		(substituted on) 46'
MF	13	Jefferson Brenes		(substituted on) 66'
MF	20	Josimar Alcócer		(substituted on) 66'
FW	24	Andy Rojas		(substituted on) 83'
Manager:
(Argentina) Gustavo Alfaro

Man of the Match:
Luis Díaz (Colombia)

Assistant referees:
Martin Soppi (Uruguay)
Pablo Llarena (Uruguay)
Fourth official:
Augusto Aragón (Ecuador)
Fifth official:
Ricardo Baren (Ecuador)
Video assistant referee:
Héctor Paletta (Argentina)
Assistant video assistant referee:
Cristhian Ferreyra (Uruguay)

=== Paraguay vs Brazil ===
The two teams had faced each other in 82 previous matches, including 31 times in the Copa América with 13 wins for Brazil, seven wins for Paraguay along with 11 draws. Their most recent meeting was a 4–0 home win for Brazil in the 2022 FIFA World Cup qualification in February 2022.

June 28, 2024
6:00 pm PDT (UTC−7)

Paraguay	1–4	Brazil
Alderete 48'	Report (CONMEBOL); Report (CONCACAF)	Vinícius 35', 45+5'; Savinho 43'; Paquetá 65' (pen.)

Allegiant Stadium, Paradise, Nevada
Attendance: 46,939
Referee: Piero Maza (Chile)

Paraguay	Brazil

GK	22	Rodrigo Morínigo
RB	25	Gustavo Velázquez
CB	5	Fabián Balbuena (c)	(yellow card) 45+3'
CB	3	Omar Alderete
LB	4	Matías Espinoza		(substituted off) 73'
CM	14	Andrés Cubas	(red card) 81'
CM	23	Mathías Villasanti
RW	8	Damián Bobadilla		(substituted off) 84'
AM	19	Julio Enciso		(substituted off) 72'
LW	10	Miguel Almirón		(substituted off) 78'
CF	18	Alex Arce		(substituted off) 73'
Substitutions:
MF	17	Kaku		(substituted on) 72'
DF	13	Néstor Giménez		(substituted on) 73'
FW	9	Adam Bareiro		(substituted on) 73'
FW	24	Ramón Sosa		(substituted on) 78'
MF	26	Hernesto Caballero	(yellow card) 90+3'	(substituted on) 84'
Manager:
(Argentina) Daniel Garnero

GK	1	Alisson
RB	2	Danilo (c)
CB	3	Éder Militão		(substituted off) 87'
CB	4	Marquinhos
LB	6	Wendell	(yellow card) 45+3'
CM	5	Bruno Guimarães		(substituted off) 72'
CM	15	João Gomes
RW	20	Savinho		(substituted off) 72'
AM	8	Lucas Paquetá	(yellow card) 70'	(substituted off) 79'
LW	7	Vinícius Júnior	(yellow card) 83'
CF	10	Rodrygo		(substituted off) 79'
Substitutions:
FW	11	Raphinha		(substituted on) 72'
MF	18	Douglas Luiz		(substituted on) 72'
FW	9	Endrick		(substituted on) 79'
MF	19	Andreas Pereira		(substituted on) 79'
DF	14	Gabriel Magalhães		(substituted on) 87'
Manager:
Dorival Júnior

Man of the Match:
Vinícius Júnior (Brazil)

Assistant referees:
Claudio Urrutia (Chile)
Miguel Rocha (Chile)
Fourth official:
Maurizio Mariani (Italy)
Fifth official:
Daniele Bindoni (Italy)
Video assistant referee:
Juan Lara (Chile)
Assistant video assistant referee:
Edson Cisternas (Chile)

=== Brazil vs Colombia ===
The two teams had faced each other in 36 previous matches, including 11 times in the Copa América with Brazil dominating with eight matches won to just two wins for Colombia plus one draw. Their most recent meeting was a 2–1 home win for Colombia in the 2026 FIFA World Cup qualification in November 2023.

July 2, 2024
6:00 pm PDT (UTC−7)

Brazil	1–1	Colombia
Raphinha 12'	Report (CONMEBOL); Report (CONCACAF)	Muñoz 45+2'

Levi's Stadium, Santa Clara, California
Attendance: 70,971
Referee: Jesús Valenzuela (Venezuela)

Brazil	Colombia

GK	1	Alisson
RB	2	Danilo (c)
CB	3	Éder Militão
CB	4	Marquinhos
LB	6	Wendell		(substituted off) 86'
CM	5	Bruno Guimarães	(yellow card) 73'	(substituted off) 86'
CM	15	João Gomes	(yellow card) 27'	(substituted off) 73'
RW	11	Raphinha
AM	8	Lucas Paquetá		(substituted off) 46'
LW	7	Vinícius Júnior	(yellow card) 7'
CF	10	Rodrygo		(substituted off) 73'
Substitutions:
MF	19	Andreas Pereira		(substituted on) 46'
MF	24	Éderson		(substituted on) 73'
FW	20	Savinho		(substituted on) 73'
MF	18	Douglas Luiz		(substituted on) 86'
FW	9	Endrick		(substituted on) 86'
Manager:
Dorival Júnior

GK	12	Camilo Vargas
RB	21	Daniel Muñoz
CB	23	Davinson Sánchez
CB	2	Carlos Cuesta
LB	26	Deiver Machado	(yellow card) 25'	(substituted off) 46'
CM	6	Richard Ríos		(substituted off) 76'
CM	16	Jefferson Lerma	(yellow card) 27'
CM	11	Jhon Arias
RF	10	James Rodríguez (c)		(substituted off) 81'
CF	24	Jhon Córdoba		(substituted off) 76'
LF	7	Luis Díaz		(substituted off) 89'
Substitutions:
DF	17	Johan Mojica		(substituted on) 46'
MF	15	Mateus Uribe		(substituted on) 76'
FW	19	Rafael Santos Borré		(substituted on) 76'
MF	8	Jorge Carrascal		(substituted on) 81'
FW	18	Luis Sinisterra		(substituted on) 89'
Manager:
(Argentina) Néstor Lorenzo

Man of the Match:
James Rodríguez (Colombia)

Assistant referees:
Jorge Urrego (Venezuela)
Alberto Ponte (Venezuela)
Fourth official:
Augusto Aragón (Ecuador)
Fifth official:
Christian Lescano (Ecuador)
Video assistant referee:
Mauro Vigliano (Argentina)
Assistant video assistant referee:
Jonny Bossio (Peru)

=== Costa Rica vs Paraguay ===
The two teams had met nine times previously, with an even record of three wins per side and three draws. Two of those matches came at the Copa América, both in the group stage: Paraguay's 1–0 victory in 2004 and a goalless draw in the Copa América Centenario in 2016, the latter also being the last meeting between the sides.

July 2, 2024
8:00 pm CDT (UTC−5)

Costa Rica	2–1	Paraguay
Calvo 3'; Alcócer 7'	Report (CONMEBOL); Report (CONCACAF)	Sosa 55'

Q2 Stadium, Austin, Texas
Attendance: 12,765
Referee: Yael Falcón (Argentina)

Costa Rica	Paraguay

GK	23	Patrick Sequeira
CB	3	Jeyland Mitchell
CB	4	Juan Pablo Vargas
CB	15	Francisco Calvo (c)
RM	2	Gerald Taylor
CM	14	Orlando Galo	(yellow card) 82'
CM	13	Jefferson Brenes		(substituted off) 78'
LM	8	Joseph Mora		(substituted off) 87'
AM	12	Joel Campbell		(substituted off) 68'
CF	17	Warren Madrigal		(substituted off) 78'
CF	20	Josimar Alcócer	(yellow card) 16'	(substituted off) 68'
Substitutions:
FW	21	Álvaro Zamora		(substituted on) 68'
MF	10	Brandon Aguilera		(substituted on) 68'
MF	16	Alejandro Bran		(substituted on) 78'
FW	7	Anthony Contreras	(yellow card) 85'	(substituted on) 78'
DF	6	Julio Cascante		(substituted on) 87'
Manager:
(Argentina) Gustavo Alfaro

GK	22	Rodrigo Morínigo
RB	25	Gustavo Velázquez		(substituted off) 74'
CB	5	Fabián Balbuena (c)
CB	3	Omar Alderete	(yellow card) 28'
LB	13	Néstor Giménez
CM	8	Damián Bobadilla		(substituted off) 83'
CM	23	Mathías Villasanti		(substituted off) 74'
RW	10	Miguel Almirón	(yellow card) 34'	(substituted off) 46'
AM	19	Julio Enciso
LW	24	Ramón Sosa	(yellow card) 48'
CF	9	Adam Bareiro		(substituted off) 46'
Substitutions:
MF	26	Hernesto Caballero		(substituted on) 46'
FW	11	Ángel Romero		(substituted on) 46'
DF	2	Iván Ramírez		(substituted on) 74'
MF	17	Kaku		(substituted on) 74'
FW	7	Derlis González		(substituted on) 83'
Manager:
(Argentina) Daniel Garnero

Man of the Match:
Josimar Alcócer (Costa Rica)

Assistant referees:
Facundo Rodríguez (Argentina)
Maximiliano Del Yesso (Argentina)
Fourth official:
Ivo Méndez (Bolivia)
Fifth official:
Edwar Saavedra (Bolivia)
Video assistant referee:
Leodán González (Uruguay)
Assistant video assistant referee:
Carlos López (Venezuela)
