= 2024 Supercopa Paraguay =

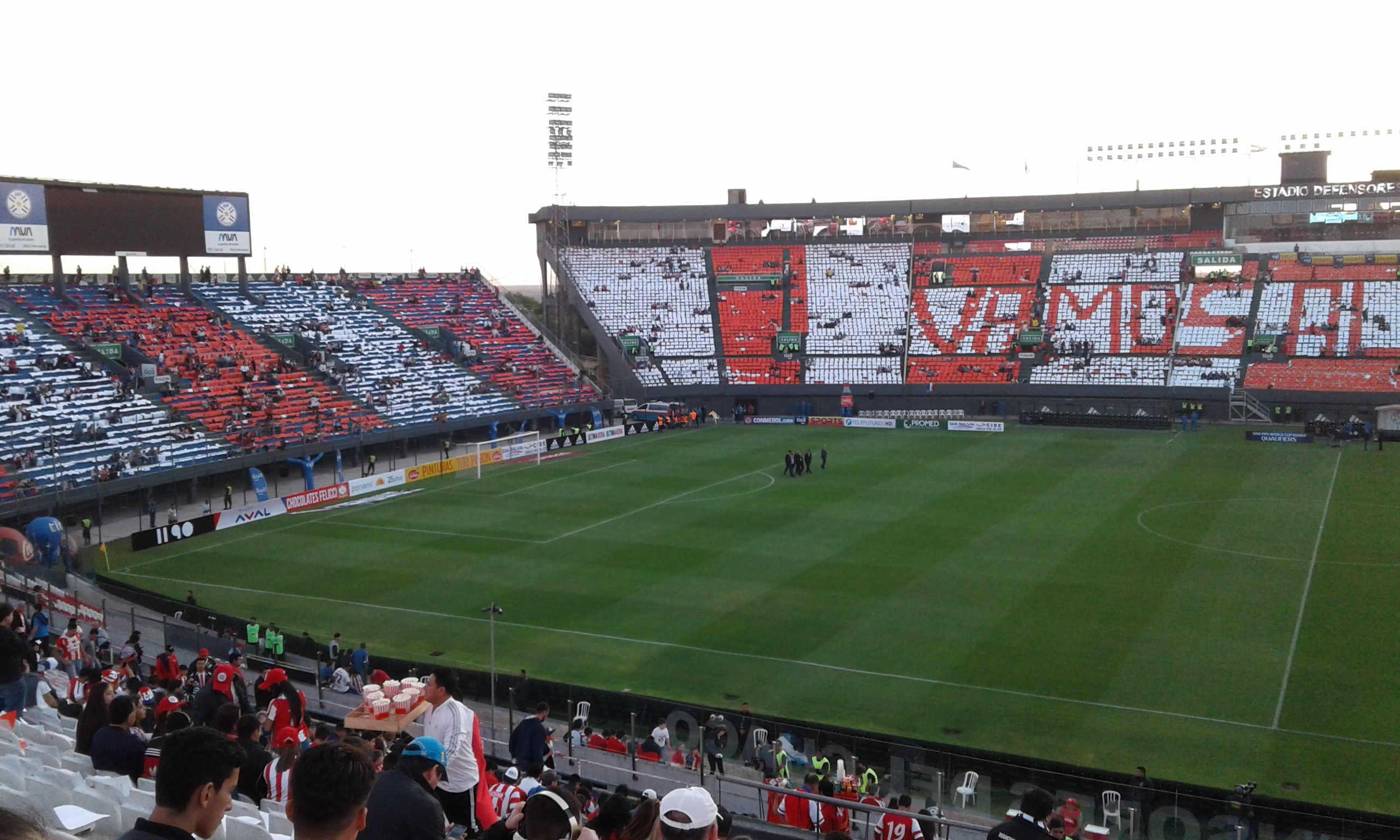
- Estadio Defensores del Chaco hosted the match.
Libertad	Olimpia
2	1
- Date: 22 January 2025
- Venue: Estadio Defensores del Chaco, Asunción
- Referee: David Ojeda

The 2024 Supercopa Paraguay was the fourth edition of the Supercopa Paraguay, Paraguay's football super cup. It was held on 22 January 2025 at Estadio Defensores del Chaco in Asunción between the 2024 Primera División best-ranked champions in the aggregate table Olimpia and the 2024 Copa Paraguay champions Libertad. This match, which was originally scheduled to be played on 23 January, was the opening event of the 2025 season of Paraguayan football.

Libertad defeated Olimpia 2–1 in the match to claim their second Supercopa Paraguay title.

== Teams ==
The Supercopa Paraguay is contested by two teams: the champions of the Copa Paraguay and the Primera División (Apertura or Clausura) champions with the best record in the aggregate table of the season.

This was the third time Olimpia played the competition, winning in 2021 but losing in the following season, while this was Libertad's second appearance in the competition, although this was the first time they played the match since the 2023 edition was automatically awarded to them for winning both Primera División tournaments as well as the Copa Paraguay held in that season.

Team	Qualification	Previous appearances (bold indicates winners)
Libertad	2024 Copa Paraguay champions	1 (**2023**)
Olimpia	2024 Primera División champions with better record in aggregate table	2 (**2021**, 2022)

== Details ==
22 January 2025
19:30 UTC−3

Libertad	2–1	Olimpia
Espinoza 41'; Santa Cruz 62'	Report	González 76'

Estadio Defensores del Chaco, Asunción
Referee: David Ojeda

**Libertad**	**Olimpia**

GK	12	(Paraguay) Rodrigo Morínigo
RB	2	(Paraguay) Iván Ramírez
CB	5	(Paraguay) Diego Vera	(yellow card) 44'
CB	4	(Paraguay) Néstor Giménez
LB	17	(Paraguay) Matías Espinoza
RM	28	(Paraguay) Marcelo Fernández		(substituted off) 66'
CM	6	(Paraguay) Álex Campuzano
CM	21	(Paraguay) Lucas Sanabria		(substituted off) 82'
LM	10	(Paraguay) Lorenzo Melgarejo		(substituted off) 90+2'
CF	24	(Paraguay) Roque Santa Cruz		(substituted off) 66'
CF	19	(Paraguay) Rubén Lezcano		(substituted off) 81'
Substitutes:
GK	1	(Uruguay) Martín Silva
DF	13	(Paraguay) Ángel Ibarra
DF	16	(Paraguay) Gilberto Flores
DF	23	(Paraguay) Pedro Villalba
DF	27	(Paraguay) Miguel Jacquet
MF	15	(Paraguay) Ángel Cardozo Lucena		(substituted on) 90+2'
MF	22	(Paraguay) Hugo Martínez
MF	26	(Paraguay) Hernesto Caballero		(substituted on) 82'
MF	32	(Paraguay) Rodrigo Villalba
FW	7	(Paraguay) Óscar Cardozo		(substituted on) 66'
FW	11	(Paraguay) Gustavo Aguilar		(substituted on) 81'
FW	20	(Paraguay) Adrián Alcaraz		(substituted on) 66'
Manager:
(Paraguay) Sergio Aquino

GK	1	(Uruguay) Gastón Olveira
RB	22	(Paraguay) Robert Rojas
CB	5	(Paraguay) Junior Barreto
CB	26	(Argentina) Alejandro Maciel
LB	36	(Argentina) Facundo Zabala
RM	11	(Paraguay) Rodney Redes		(substituted off) 60'
CM	8	(Paraguay) Alex Franco		(substituted off) 87'
CM	6	(Paraguay) Richard Ortiz	(yellow card) 47'
LM	32	(Paraguay) Erik López		(substituted off) 60'
CF	9	(Argentina) Darío Benedetto		(substituted off) 71'
CF	10	(Paraguay) Derlis González
Substitutes:
GK	25	(Paraguay) Marino Arzamendia
DF	3	(Paraguay) Hugo Javier Benítez
DF	15	(Paraguay) Axel Alfonzo
DF	16	(Paraguay) Abel Paredes
DF	21	(Paraguay) César Olmedo
MF	17	(Paraguay) Marcos Gómez
MF	18	(Paraguay) Javier Domínguez	(yellow card) 67'	(substituted on) 60'
FW	7	(Paraguay) Hugo Fernández
FW	19	(Argentina) Lucas Pratto
FW	20	(Paraguay) Antonio Bareiro		(substituted on) 87'
FW	29	(Paraguay) Iván Leguizamón		(substituted on) 60'
FW	30	(Paraguay) Hugo Adrián Benítez		(substituted on) 71'
Manager:
(Argentina) Martín Palermo

Assistant referees:
Carmelo Candia
Héctor Medina
Fourth official:
Alipio Colmán
Video assistant referee:
Carlos Figueredo
Assistant video assistant referee:
Héctor Balbuena

**Match rules**

- 90 minutes.
- Penalty shoot-out if scores still level.
- Twelve named substitutes.
- Maximum of five substitutions.
