= Hernesto Caballero =

Paraguayan footballer (born 1991)

Personal information
- Full name: Hernesto Ezequiel Caballero Benítez
- Date of birth: 9 April 1991 (age 35)
- Place of birth: San Juan Bautista, Paraguay
- Height: 1.83 m (6 ft 0 in)
- Position: Midfielder

Team information
- Current team: Libertad
- Number: 26

Senior career*
Years	Team	Apps	(Gls)
2010–2016	Fernando de la Mora		
2016	→ General Caballero ZC (loan)	37	(5)
2017–2020	Olimpia	40	(1)
2017	→ General Díaz (loan)	16	(1)
2021	River Plate Asunción	17	(5)
2022–	Libertad	124	(4)

International career^{‡}
2023–2024	Paraguay	5	(0)
- * Club domestic league appearances and goals as of 12 August 2025 ‡ National team caps and goals as of 28 June 2024

Hernesto Ezequiel Caballero Benítez (born 9 April 1991) is a Paraguayan professional footballer who plays as a midfielder for Libertad.

== Club career ==
Born in San Juan Bautista, Misiones, Caballero began his career with Fernando de la Mora in 2010, making his senior debut in the División Intermedia. Ahead of the 2016 season, he was loaned to Primera División side General Caballero ZC.

After being an undisputed starter as General Caballero suffered relegation, Caballero signed a four-year contract with Olimpia on 7 February 2017, being immediately loaned to General Díaz. On 15 June, he was recalled by his parent club.

Sparingly used at Olimpia, Caballero rescinded his contract with the club on 10 November 2020, and announced that he would sign for a Brazilian club. However, the move did not materialze, and he spent the first half of the 2021 season without a club before signing for River Plate Asunción.

On 28 December 2021, Caballero was announced at Libertad.

== International career ==
In November 2023, Caballero was called up to the Paraguay national team for two 2026 FIFA World Cup qualifying matches against Chile and Colombia. He made his full international debut on 16 November, coming on as a second-half substitute for Mathías Villasanti in a 0–0 draw against the former at the Estadio Monumental David Arellano in Santiago.

== Career statistics ==
=== International ===
As of match played 28 June 2024

Appearances and goals by national team and year
National team	Year	Apps	Goals
Paraguay	2023	2	0
Paraguay	2024	3	0
Total		5	0

== Honours ==
Olimpia

- Paraguayan Primera División: 2018 Apertura, 2018 Clausura, 2019 Apertura, 2019 Clausura

Libertad

- Paraguayan Primera División: 2022 Apertura, 2023 Apertura, 2023 Clausura, 2024 Apertura
- Copa Paraguay: 2023
- Supercopa Paraguay: 2023
