= Lucas Sanabria (Paraguayan footballer) =

Paraguayan footballer (born 1999)

Personal information
- Full name: Lucas Daniel Sanabria Brítez
- Date of birth: 13 September 1999 (age 27)
- Place of birth: Asunción, Paraguay
- Height: 1.75 m (5 ft 9 in)
- Position: Midfielder

Team information
- Current team: Libertad
- Number: 21

Youth career
- River Plate Asunción
- 2013–2020: Libertad

Senior career*
Years	Team	Apps	(Gls)
2016–	Libertad	96	(7)
2022	→ Tacuary (loan)	36	(4)

International career
2019	Paraguay U20	1	(0)
- * Club domestic league appearances and goals as of 12 August 2025

Lucas Daniel Sanabria Brítez (born 13 September 1999) is a Paraguayan professional footballer who plays as a midfielder for Libertad.

== Club career ==
Born in Asunción, Sanabria joined Libertad's youth setup at under-14 level, from River Plate Asunción. Sanabria made his first team – and Primera División – debut at the age of 17 on 16 December 2016, coming on as a second-half substitute for Jesús Medina in a 1–0 home win over General Caballero ZC.

After being rarely used in the following years, Sanabria was loaned to fellow top-tier side Tacuary for the 2022 season. He scored his first senior goals on 21 March 2022, netting a brace in a 2–1 home win over Nacional Asunción.

Back to Libertad for the 2023 campaign, Sanabria became a regular starter, and renewed his contract on 29 December of that year.

== International career ==
Sanabria represented Paraguay at under-20 level.

== Career statistics ==
As of 31 December 2023

Club	Season	League			Cup		Continental		Other		Total	
Club	Season	Division	Apps	Goals	Apps	Goals	Apps	Goals	Apps	Goals	Apps	Goals
Libertad	2016	Primera División	1	0	—		—		—		1	0
Libertad	2019	Primera División	3	0	—		0	0	—		3	0
Libertad	2020	Primera División	3	0	—		2 (Note: Appearance(s) in Copa Libertadores)	0	—		5	0
Libertad	2021	Primera División	1	0	—		1 (Note: Appearance(s) in Copa Sudamericana)	0	—		2	0
Libertad	2023	Primera División	36	4	3	0	10 (Note: Six appearances in Copa Libertadores, four appearances in Copa Sudamericana)	0	—		49	4
Libertad	Total		44	4	3	0	13	0	—		60	4
Tacuary (loan)	2022	Primera División	36	4	—		—		—		36	4
Career total			80	8	3	0	13	0	0	0	96	8

== Honours ==
Libertad

- Paraguayan Primera División: 2021 Apertura, 2023 Apertura, 2023 Clausura
