= Gustavo Almada =

Bolivian footballer (born 1994)

Personal information
- Full name: Gustavo Javier Almada Gonzales
- Date of birth: 29 April 1994 (age 32)
- Place of birth: Itauguá, Paraguay
- Height: 1.82 m (6 ft 0 in)
- Position: Goalkeeper

Team information
- Current team: Blooming
- Number: 71

Youth career
- 2009–2012: Sol Paraguayo

Senior career*
Years	Team	Apps	(Gls)
2012–2014	Sol Paraguayo		
2015–2016	Norte América		
2016	Torre Fuerte		
2017	Universidad Cruceña		
2017	Torre Fuerte		
2018	Destroyers		
2019	Torre Fuerte		
2020	Aurora	0	(0)
2020	Sur-Car		
2021	Torre Fuerte	12	(0)
2022	CDT Real Oruro	0	(0)
2022–2024	Universitario de Vinto	49	(0)
2025–	Blooming	0	(0)
- * Club domestic league appearances and goals as of 20:15, 23 March 2025 (UTC)

Gustavo Javier Almada Gonzales (born 29 April 1994) is a professional footballer who plays as a goalkeeper for Bolivian club Blooming. Born in Paraguay, he represents Bolivia at international level.

== Club career ==
Born in Itauguá, Almada played for hometown sides Sol Paraguayo and Norte América before moving to Bolivia in 2016 with Torre Fuerte. He subsequently continued to appear for clubs in the country, representing Universidad Cruceña, Torre Fuerte and Destroyers before signing for Aurora in January 2020.

After failing to feature in a single match for Aurora, Almada joined Sur-Car in October 2020, and later went on a trial period at San José. In 2022, after a short period at CDT Real Oruro, he signed for Primera División side Universitario de Vinto.

Initially a backup option, Almada made his professional debut at the age of 28 on 10 September 2022, coming on as a second-half substitute for Raúl Olivares in a 2–0 away loss to Bolívar.

== International career ==
A naturalized citizen of Bolivia after spending more than five years living in the country, Almada was called up to the Bolivia national team on 20 May 2024, for a friendly against Mexico. He was also included in Antônio Carlos Zago's 26-man squad for the 2024 Copa América.
