= Josimar Alcócer =

Costa Rican footballer (born 2004)

Personal information
- Full name: Josimar Angelo Alcócer McCook
- Date of birth: 7 July 2004 (age 22)
- Place of birth: San José, Costa Rica
- Height: 1.85 m (6 ft 1 in)
- Position: Second striker

Team information
- Current team: Sparta Prague
- Number: 7

Youth career
- 20??–2021: Alajuelense
- 2020–2021: → Juventud Escazuceña (loan)

Senior career*
Years	Team	Apps	(Gls)
2021–2023	Alajuelense	56	(6)
2023–2026	Westerlo	77	(5)
2026–	Sparta Prague	8	(4)

International career^{‡}
2022	Costa Rica U20	5	(1)
2023–	Costa Rica	37	(7)
- * Club domestic league appearances and goals as of 13 September 2026 ‡ National team caps and goals as of 4 October 2026

Josimar Angelo Alcócer McCook (born 7 July 2004) is a Costa Rican professional footballer who plays as a second striker for Czech First League club Sparta Prague and the Costa Rica national team.

== Club career ==
Alcócer made his professional debut for LD Alajuelense on 1 August 2021, against Sporting San Jose appearing as a substitute for Barlon Sequeira in the 76th minute in a 3-3 draw. He scored his first senior goal on 12 September 2021 against Guadalupe, when still seventeen years-old.

On 14 August 2023, Alcócer signed a five-year contract with Westerlo in Belgium.

On 4 July 2026, Alcócer signed a contract with Czech First League club Sparta Prague.

== International career ==
On 17 March 2023, he was called-up by the technical director Luis Fernando Suárez for the senior Costa Rica national football team for CONCACAF Nations League matches against Martinique and Panama. On 25 March 2023 he made his senior debut starting against Martinique in a 2–1 victory. In June 2023 he was included in the Costa Rica squad for the 2023 CONCACAF Gold Cup.

== Career statistics ==
=== Club ===
As of match played 12 September 2026

Appearances and goals by club, season and competition
Club	Season	League			National cup		Continental		Other		Total	
Club	Season	Division	Apps	Goals	Apps	Goals	Apps	Goals	Apps	Goals	Apps	Goals
Alajuelense	2021–22	Liga FPD	19	2	0	0	1 (Note: Appearances in Copa Libertadores)	0	—		20	2
Alajuelense	2022–23	Liga FPD	34	4	0	0	2	0	—		36	4
Alajuelense	2023–24	Liga FPD	3	0	0	0	3 (Note: Two appearances in CONCACAF Champions Cup, one appearance in CONCACAF Central American Cup)	0	—		6	0
Alajuelense	Total		56	6	0	0	6	0	—		62	6
Westerlo	2023–24	Belgian Pro League	10	1	0	0	—		—		10	1
Westerlo	2024–25	Belgian Pro League	32	1	2	0	—		—		34	1
Westerlo	2025–26	Belgian Pro League	26	3	1	0	—		—		27	3
Westerlo	Total		68	5	3	0	—		—		71	5
Sparta Prague	2026–27	Czech First League	8	4	1	0	3 (Note: Two appearances in UEFA Champions League, one appearance in UEFA Europa League)	0	—		12	4
Career total			132	15	4	0	9	0	0	0	145	15

=== International ===
As of match played 4 October 2026

Appearances and goals by national team and year
National team	Year	Apps	Goals
Costa Rica	2023	7	0
Costa Rica	2024	9	3
Costa Rica	2025	14	3
Costa Rica	2026	7	1
Total		37	7

Scores and results list Costa Rica's goal tally first, score column indicates score after each Alcócer goal.

List of international goals scored by Josimar Alcócer
No.	Date	Venue	Opponent	Score	Result	Competition
1	6 June 2024	Estadio Nacional, San José, Costa Rica	Saint Kitts and Nevis	3–0	4–0	2026 FIFA World Cup qualification
2	2 July 2024	Q2 Stadium, Austin, United States	Paraguay	2–0	2–1	2024 Copa América
3	11 October 2024	Frank Essed Stadion, Paramaribo, Suriname	Suriname	1–0	1–1	2024–25 CONCACAF Nations League
4	21 March 2025	FFB Stadium, Belmopan, Belize	Belize	6–0	7–0	2025 CONCACAF Gold Cup qualification
5	15 June 2025	Snapdragon Stadium, San Diego, United States	Suriname	3–3	4–3	2025 CONCACAF Gold Cup
6	18 June 2025	AT&T Stadium, Arlington, United States	Dominican Republic	2–1	2–1	2025 CONCACAF Gold Cup
18.	27 March 2026	Mardan Sports Complex, Antalya, Turkey	Jordan	1–2	2–2	2026 Jordan International Tournament
