= 2023 Supercopa Paraguay =

Supercopa Paraguay
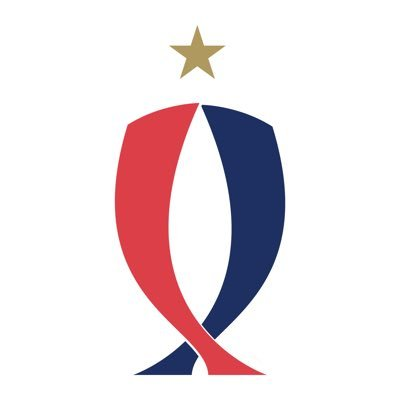
- Season: 2023
- Champions: Libertad (1st title)

The 2023 Supercopa Paraguay was the planned third edition of the Supercopa Paraguay, Paraguay's football super cup. It was supposed to feature the 2023 Primera División best-ranked champions in the aggregate table against the 2023 Copa Paraguay champions, opening the 2024 season of Paraguayan football.

== Teams ==
The Supercopa Paraguay is contested by two teams: the champions of the Copa Paraguay and the Primera División (Apertura or Clausura) champions with the best record in the aggregate table of the season. As Libertad won both Primera División Apertura and Clausura tournaments, it was decided that if they also won the Copa Paraguay, the Supercopa Paraguay match would be cancelled and they would be awarded the title automatically.

Libertad was eventually awarded the 2023 Supercopa Paraguay title after beating Sportivo Trinidense in the final of the 2023 Copa Paraguay.

Team	Qualification
Libertad	2023 Copa Paraguay champions
Libertad	2023 Primera División champions with better record in aggregate table
