= Daniel Garnero =

Argentine football manager (born 1969)

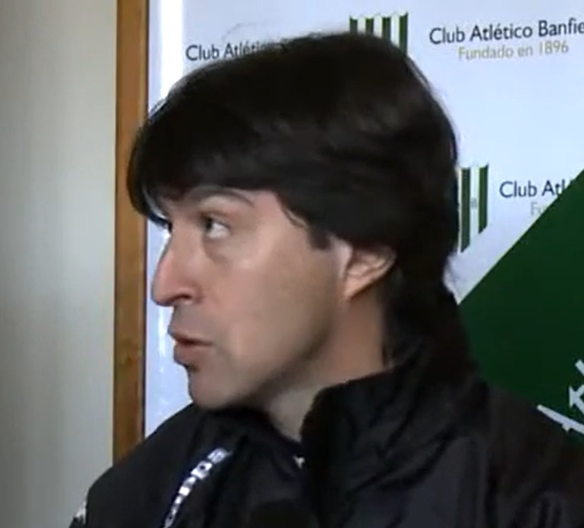
- Garnero in 2012

Personal information
- Full name: Daniel Oscar Garnero
- Date of birth: 1 April 1969 (age 57)
- Place of birth: Lomas de Zamora, Argentina
- Height: 1.80 m (5 ft 11 in)
- Position: Midfielder

Team information
- Current team: Universidad Católica (head coach)

Senior career*
Years	Team	Apps	(Gls)
1991–1995	Independiente	129	(14)
1996	Universidad Católica	15	(1)
1997–1999	Independiente	78	(7)
2000	Toros Neza	12	(3)
2000–2001	Independiente	27	(1)
Total		261	(26)

International career
1995	Argentina	1	(0)

Managerial career
- 2002–2005: Arsenal de Sarandí (assistant)
- 2005–2006: Estudiantes La Plata (assistant)
- 2006–2007: Independiente (assistant)
- 2008–2009: Arsenal de Sarandí
- 2010: Independiente
- 2011–2012: San Martín SJ
- 2012–2013: Banfield
- 2013–2014: San Martín SJ
- 2014–2015: Independiente Rivadavia
- 2015–2016: Sol de América
- 2016–2017: Guaraní
- 2018–2020: Olimpia
- 2021–2023: Libertad
- 2023–2024: Paraguay
- 2024: Libertad
- 2025–: Universidad Católica
- * Club domestic league appearances and goals

Daniel Oscar Garnero (born 1 April 1969) is an Argentine football manager and former player who played as a midfielder. He is the manager of Chilean club Universidad Católica.

== Career ==
Garnero played most of his career for Club Atlético Independiente. He also made a short spell in Chilean football with Universidad Católica, and Mexico with Toros Neza.

== Coaching career ==
After retiring as a player, Garnero became the assistant manager to Jorge Burruchaga at Arsenal de Sarandí. He has also held coaching positions at Estudiantes de La Plata and Independiente. In July 2008 he was appointed as manager of Arsenal de Sarandí as replacement for Gustavo Alfaro. On 25 April 2009 he was sacked as manager of Arsenal de Sarandi. On 20 May 2010 was named as Independiente's new coach, the former Diablos Rojos player replaces Americo Gallego, who left the club a few days ago. On 21 September 2010, Independiente have parted ways with coach Daniel Garnero by mutual consent, just four months after he took over from Americo Gallego at the Argentine giants. He later coached San Martín SJ, Banfield and Independiente Rivadavia, before moving to Paraguay, where he managed Sol de América, Guaraní, Olimpia and Libertad. He later became the head coach of Paraguay national team, until he was dismissed after a winless group stage exit from the 2024 Copa América.

== Managerial statistics ==
As of match played 8 November 2026

Managerial record by team and tenure
Team	Nat	From	To	Record							
Team	Nat	From	To	G	W	D	L	GF	GA	GD	Win %
Arsenal de Sarandí	(Argentina)	1 July 2008	26 April 2009	37	14	9	14	48	52	−4	37.84
Independiente	(Argentina)	1 July 2010	20 September 2010	9	1	4	4	7	13	−6	11.11
San Martín SJ	(Argentina)	15 March 2011	23 April 2012	48	17	16	15	45	41	+4	35.42
Banfield	(Argentina)	16 July 2012	29 March 2013	27	12	6	9	32	29	+3	44.44
San Martín SJ	(Argentina)	4 July 2013	1 October 2013	10	3	3	4	11	12	−1	30.00
Independiente Rivadavia	(Argentina)	1 November 2014	27 April 2015	20	9	2	9	23	26	−3	45.00
Sol de América	(Paraguay)	11 June 2015	19 May 2016	44	16	13	15	76	71	+5	36.36
Guaraní	(Paraguay)	6 August 2016	31 December 2017	68	42	9	17	121	82	+39	61.76
Olimpia	(Paraguay)	1 January 2018	25 October 2020	139	88	35	16	308	122	+186	63.31
Libertad	(Paraguay)	1 January 2021	20 September 2023	156	93	28	35	275	140	+135	59.62
Paraguay	(Paraguay)	20 September 2023	8 July 2024	10	2	2	6	5	13	−8	20.00
Libertad	(Paraguay)	20 August 2024	4 November 2024	18	6	4	8	14	17	−3	33.33
Universidad Católica	(Chile)	12 June 2025	present	68	39	15	14	122	77	+45	57.35
Total				654	342	146	166	1,087	696	+391	52.29
