= Gustavo Velázquez =

Paraguayan footballer (born 1991)

- Velázquez with Paraguay in 2026

Personal information
- Full name: Víctor Gustavo Velázquez Ramos
- Date of birth: 17 April 1991 (age 35)
- Place of birth: Itauguá, Paraguay
- Height: 1.79 m (5 ft 10 in)
- Position: Centre-back

Team information
- Current team: Cerro Porteño
- Number: 23

Senior career*
Years	Team	Apps	(Gls)
2012–2013	Cerro Porteño	61	(1)
2014	Sportivo Luqueño	19	(1)
2014–2015	Nacional Asunción	49	(0)
2016–2017	Cerro Porteño	11	(1)
2016–2017	→ Sol de América (loan)	37	(4)
2018	Nacional Asunción	37	(4)
2019	Lobos BUAP	5	(0)
2019–2022	Juárez	77	(5)
2022	→ Newell's Old Boys (loan)	26	(1)
2023–2024	Newell's Old Boys	70	(5)
2025–	Cerro Porteño	47	(1)

International career^{‡}
2024–	Paraguay	18	(1)
- * Club domestic league appearances and goals as of 11 May 2026 ‡ National team caps and goals as of 4 July 2026

Víctor Gustavo Velázquez Ramos (born 17 April 1991) is a Paraguayan professional footballer who plays as a centre-back for Cerro Porteño and the Paraguay national team.

== Club career ==
Velázquez joined FC Juárez in 2019.

On 10 February 2022, Velázquez joined Newell's Old Boys on loan from Juárez.

== International career ==
Velázquez made his debut for the Paraguay national team on 7 June 2024 in a friendly against Peru at Estadio Monumental. He played the full game, which ended in a scoreless draw. He represented Paraguay at the 2024 Copa América.

On 1 June 2026, Velázquez was announced as part of the Paraguay squad for the 2026 FIFA World Cup. In the round of 16 match against France he scuffed the penalty spot, without any sanction from the referee, in order to try to hinder Kylian Mbappe who went on to score and win the match.

== Career statistics ==
=== International ===
As of match played 4 July 2026

Appearances and goals by national team and year
National team	Year	Apps	Goals
Paraguay	2024	6	1
Paraguay	2025	5	0
Paraguay	2026	7	0
Total		18	1

Paraguay score listed first, score column indicates score after each Velázquez goal.

List of international goals scored by Gustavo Velázquez
No.	Date	Venue	Opponent	Score	Result	Competition
1	16 June 2024	Estadio Rommel Fernández, Panama City, Panama	Panama	1–0	1–0	Friendly
