= Rodrigo Morínigo =

Paraguayan footballer (born 1997)

Personal information
- Full name: Rodrigo Mario Morínigo Acosta
- Date of birth: 7 October 1998 (age 28)
- Place of birth: Lambaré, Paraguay
- Height: 1.87 m (6 ft 2 in)
- Position: Goalkeeper

Team information
- Current team: Libertad
- Number: 12

Youth career
- Libertad

Senior career*
Years	Team	Apps	(Gls)
2017–	Libertad	62	(0)

International career^{‡}
2024–	Paraguay	3	(0)
- * Club domestic league appearances and goals as of 12 August 2025 ‡ National team caps and goals as of 12 August 2025

Rodrigo Mario Morínigo Acosta (born 7 October 1998) is a Paraguayan professional footballer who plays as a goalkeeper for Libertad and the Paraguay national team.

== Club career ==
Born in Lambaré, Morínigo was a Libertad youth graduate and was promoted to the main squad in 2017. He made his first team – and Primera División – debut on 15 April 2018, coming on as a second-half substitute for field player Iván Ramírez as Carlos Servin was sent off in a 2–1 home loss to Sportivo Luqueño.

Morínigo spent the following three seasons as a third-choice behind Martín Silva and Servin, later becoming a backup option ahead of Ignacio Don midway through the 2022 season. In March 2024, he became a first-choice after Silva suffered a facial injury.

== International career ==
On 31 May 2024, Morínigo was called up to the Paraguay national team for friendlies against Peru, Chile and Panama.

Morínigo made his debut on 24 June 2024 in a Copa América game against Colombia. He played the full game in Paraguay's 1–2 loss.

== Career statistics ==
=== Club ===
As of match played 29 November 2024

Appearances and goals by club, season and competition
Club	Season	League			National cup		Continental		Other		Total	
Club	Season	Division	Apps	Goals	Apps	Goals	Apps	Goals	Apps	Goals	Apps	Goals
Libertad	2017	Paraguayan Primera División	0	0	—		—		—		0	0
Libertad	2018	Paraguayan Primera División	1	0	—		0	0	—		1	0
Libertad	2019	Paraguayan Primera División	0	0	—		—		—		0	0
Libertad	2020	Paraguayan Primera División	0	0	—		0	0	—		0	0
Libertad	2021	Paraguayan Primera División	1	0	—		0	0	—		1	0
Libertad	2022	Paraguayan Primera División	2	0	—		0	0	—		2	0
Libertad	2023	Paraguayan Primera División	4	0	0	0	0	0	—		4	0
Libertad	2024	Paraguayan Primera División	25	0	5	0	8	0	—		38	0
Career total			33	0	5	0	8	0	0	0	46	0

=== International ===
As of match played 28 June 2024

Appearances and goals by national team and year
National team	Year	Apps	Goals
Paraguay	2024	2	0
Total		2	0

== Honours ==
Libertad

- Paraguayan Primera División: 2021 Apertura, 2022 Apertura, 2023 Apertura, 2023 Clausura
