= Patrick Sequeira =

Costa Rican football player (born 1999)

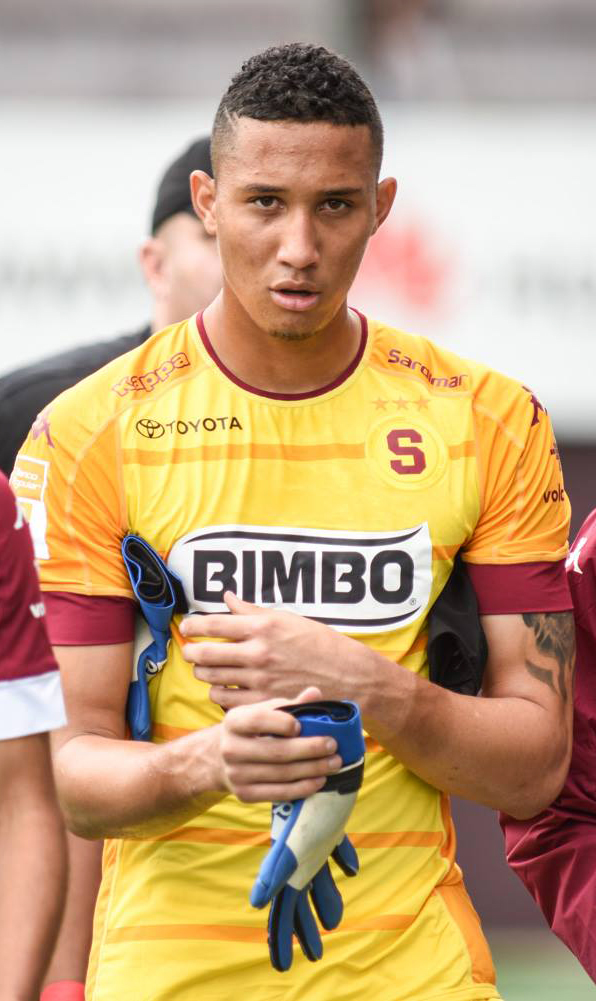
- Sequeira with Saprissa in 2017

Personal information
- Full name: Patrick Gilmar Sequeira Mejías
- Date of birth: 1 March 1999 (age 27)
- Place of birth: Limón, Costa Rica
- Height: 1.90 m (6 ft 3 in)
- Position: Goalkeeper

Team information
- Current team: Casa Pia
- Number: 1

Youth career
- –2015: Limón
- 2015–2017: Saprissa

Senior career*
Years	Team	Apps	(Gls)
2017–2019	Saprissa	0	(0)
2017–2019	→ Real Unión (loan)	9	(0)
2019–2022	Real Unión	16	(0)
2020–2021	→ Celta Vigo B (loan)	16	(0)
2022–2023	Lugo	4	(0)
2023–2024	Ibiza	28	(0)
2024–	Casa Pia	61	(0)

International career^{‡}
2015	Costa Rica U15	2	(0)
2021	Costa Rica U23	1	(0)
2022–	Costa Rica	20	(0)
- * Club domestic league appearances and goals as of 18 May 2026 ‡ National team caps and goals as of 10 June 2026

Patrick Gilmar Sequeira Mejías (born 1 March 1999) is a Costa Rican professional footballer who plays as a goalkeeper for Primeira Liga club Casa Pia and the Costa Rica national team.

== Club career ==
Born in Limón, Sequeira was promoted to the first team of Deportivo Saprissa in June 2016. In August 2017, after being only a third-choice, he moved abroad and signed a two-year loan deal with Spanish side Real Unión.

Sequeira made his senior debut for Real Unión on 29 October 2017, in a 3–0 Segunda División B away loss against CD Tudelano. On 16 July 2019, after acting mainly as a backup, he signed a permanent two-year contract.

On 8 September 2020, Sequeira moved to Celta Vigo on loan for one year, being initially assigned to the reserves in Segunda División B. Upon returning, he featured rarely for Real Unión in Primera División RFEF.

On 4 July 2022, Sequeira agreed to a three-year deal with Segunda División side CD Lugo.

On 3 July 2023, Sequeira signed a two-year contract with Primera Federación club Ibiza.

On 25 July 2024, a deal was agreed for Sequeira's transfer to Primeira Liga side Casa Pia.

== International career ==
Sequeira was part of the squad at the 2021 CONCACAF Gold Cup, but did not play any match. Originally set to make his debut in a group stage match against Jamaica, he suffered an ankle injury moments before the match and was replaced by Leonel Moreira.

His debut came during a friendly match against South Korea in November 2022, when Sequeira came in as a substitute for Joel Campbell as Esteban Alvarado received a red card. Sequeira's first instant of action as a goalkeeper for Costa Rica was also his first goal conceded, as Alvarado's red card also meant a close free kick eventually scored by Son Heung-min.

During the Copa America of 2024, Sequeira kept a clean sheet vs Brasil, becoming the first Costa Rican keeper to do so in 64 years, he subsequently was honored with the player of the match award.

== Career statistics ==
=== Club ===
As of match played 29 May 2026

Appearances and goals by club, season and competition
Club	Season	League			Cup		League cup		Other		Total	
Club	Season	Division	Apps	Goals	Apps	Goals	Apps	Goals	Apps	Goals	Apps	Goals
Saprissa	2016–17	Liga FPD	0	0	0	0	—		0	0	0	0
Real Unión (loan)	2017–18	Segunda División B	4	0	—		—		—		4	0
Real Unión (loan)	2018–19	Segunda División B	5	0	—		—		—		5	0
Real Unión (loan)	Total		9	0	0	0	—		0	0	9	0
Real Unión	2019–20	Segunda División B	13	0	0	0	—		—		13	0
Real Unión	2021–22	Primera Federación	3	0	1	0	—		—		4	0
Real Unión	Total		16	0	1	0	—		—		17	0
Celta Vigo B (loan)	2020–21	Segunda División B	16	0	—		—		—		16	0
Celta Vigo (loan)	2020–21	La Liga	0	0	0	0	—		0	0	0	0
Lugo	2022–23	Segunda División	4	0	0	0	—		—		4	0
Ibiza	2023–24	Primera Federación	28	0	0	0	—		—		28	0
Casa Pia	2024–25	Primeira Liga	32	0	0	0	0	0	—		32	0
Casa Pia	2025–26	Primeira Liga	29	0	0	0	0	0	2 (Note: Appearances in relegation play-offs)	0	31	0
Casa Pia	2026–27	Primeira Liga	0	0	0	0	0	0	—		0	0
Casa Pia	Total		61	0	0	0	0	0	2	0	63	0
Career total			134	0	1	0	0	0	2	0	137	0

=== International ===
As of match played 10 June 2026

Appearances and goals by national team and year
National team	Year	Apps	Goals
Costa Rica	2023	2	0
Costa Rica	2024	12	0
Costa Rica	2025	2	0
Costa Rica	2026	4	0
Total		20	0

== Honours ==
Individual

- Primeira Liga Goalkeeper of the Month: December 2024,
