= Haxzel Quirós =

Costa Rican association football player

Personal information
- Full name: Haxzel Quirós Cruz
- Date of birth: 3 June 1998 (age 28)
- Place of birth: Nicoya, Costa Rica
- Height: 1.70 m (5 ft 7 in)
- Position: Defender

Team information
- Current team: Herediano
- Number: 5

Youth career
- Puntarenas

Senior career*
Years	Team	Apps	(Gls)
2020–2021	Municipal Grecia	18	(0)
2021–2022	Guadalupe	22	(2)
2022–2023	Guanacasteca	52	(1)
2023–	Herediano	114	(5)

International career^{‡}
2023–	Costa Rica	20	(0)
- * Club domestic league appearances and goals as of 23:25 (UTC) 19 September 2026 ‡ National team caps and goals as of 10 June 2026

Haxzel Quirós Cruz (born 3 June 1998) is a Costa Rican footballer who plays for Herediano and the Costa Rica national team.

== Career ==
A full-back, Quirós left his home on Chira Island to pursue a football career when he was 17 years-old to join Puntarenas. He played for Municipal Grecia, Guadalupe and A.D. Guanacasteca. He Joined C.S. Herediano in May 2023.

== International career ==
He made his debut for the Costa Rica national football team in September 2023 against the UAE.

== Career statistics ==
=== International ===
As of match played 10 June 2026

Appearances and goals by national team and year
National team	Year	Apps	Goals
Costa Rica	2023	1	0
Costa Rica	2024	11	0
Costa Rica	2025	5	0
Costa Rica	2026	3	0
Total		20	0
