= Néstor Giménez =

Paraguayan footballer (born 1997)

Personal information
- Full name: Néstor Rafael Giménez Florentín
- Date of birth: 24 July 1997 (age 29)
- Place of birth: Itá, Paraguay
- Height: 1.74 m (5 ft 9 in)
- Position: Left back

Team information
- Current team: Libertad
- Number: 4

Youth career
- Libertad

Senior career*
Years	Team	Apps	(Gls)
2016–	Libertad	121	(2)
2019–2020	→ Nacional (loan)	12	(0)
2021–2022	→ Tacuary (loan)	38	(2)

International career^{‡}
2019–2020	Paraguay U23	2	(0)
2024–	Paraguay	3	(0)
- * Club domestic league appearances and goals as of 12 August 2025 ‡ National team caps and goals as of 28 June 2024

Néstor Rafael Giménez Florentín (born 24 July 1997) is a Paraguayan professional footballer who plays as a left back for Libertad and the Paraguay national team.

== Club career ==
A Libertad youth graduate, Giménez made his professional debut with the team in 2016. To gain more gain time, Giménez had loan spells to Paraguayan Primera División fellows Nacional and Tacuary from 2019 to 2022.

Back to Libertad in 2022, Ginénez had more game time with the club, but was eventually the second choice left back behind Matias Espinoza.

== International career ==
In November 2023, Giménez received his first call up to the Paraguay national team for the 2026 FIFA World Cup qualification games but did not play.

In June 2024, he made his international debut with Paraguay, in a 0–3 defeat against Chile. Three days later, he was included in the final squad for the 2024 Copa América.

== Career statistics ==
=== International ===
As of 28 June 2024

National team	Year	Apps	Goals
Paraguay	2024	3	0
Total		3	0

== Honours ==
Libertad

- Paraguayan Primera División: 2016 Apertura, 2017 Apertura, 2023 Apertura, 2023 Clausura
