= Iván Ramírez (footballer, born 1994) =

Paraguayan footballer

Personal information
- Full name: Iván Rodrigo Ramírez Segovia
- Date of birth: 8 December 1994 (age 31)
- Place of birth: Asunción, Paraguay
- Height: 1.77 m (5 ft 10 in)
- Position: Right-back

Team information
- Current team: Libertad
- Number: 2

Youth career
- –2013: Libertad

Senior career*
Years	Team	Apps	(Gls)
2013–2022	Libertad	122	(5)
2015	→ Deportivo Santaní (loan)	7	(1)
2016	→ Rubio Ñu (loan)	19	(4)
2018–2019	→ Godoy Cruz (loan)	11	(1)
2019	→ Deportivo Santaní (loan)	11	(0)
2019–2020	→ Guaraní (loan)	33	(0)
2022	Central Córdoba SdE	7	(0)
2023–	Libertad	85	(5)

International career^{‡}
2011	Paraguay U17	8	(0)
2013	Paraguay U20	5	(0)
2017–	Paraguay	7	(0)
- * Club domestic league appearances and goals as of 12 August 2025 ‡ National team caps and goals as of 18:23, 26 May 2025 (UTC)

Iván Rodrigo Ramírez Segovia (born 8 December 1994) is a Paraguayan footballer who plays as a right-back for Paraguayan Primera División club Libertad and the Paraguay national team.

== Club statistics ==
As of 25 April 2024

Appearances and goals by club, season and competition
Club	Season	League			Cup (Note: Appearances in Copa Argentina and Copa Paraguay)		Continental (Note: Appearances in Copa Sudamericana and Copa Libertadores)		Total	
Club	Season	Division	Apps	Goals	Apps	Goals	Apps	Goals	Apps	Goals
Libertad	2013	Paraguayan Primera División	3	0	—		0	0	3	0
Libertad	2014	Paraguayan Primera División	26	1	—		2	0	28	1
Libertad	2015	Paraguayan Primera División	6	0	—		2	0	8	0
Libertad	2016	Paraguayan Primera División	18	0	—		0	0	18	0
Libertad	2017	Paraguayan Primera División	37	4	—		10	0	47	4
Libertad	2018	Paraguayan Primera División	8	0	—		1	0	9	0
Libertad	2020	Paraguayan Primera División	11	0	—		4	0	15	0
Libertad	2021	Paraguayan Primera División	13	0	—		9	0	22	0
Libertad	Total		122	5	0	0	28	0		
Deportivo Santaní (loan)	2015	Paraguayan Primera División	7	1	—		—		7	1
Rubio Ñu (loan)	2016	Paraguayan Primera División	19	4	—		—		19	4
Godoy Cruz (loan)	2018–19	Argentine Primera División	12	0	1	0	—		13	0
Deportivo Santaní (loan)	2019	Paraguayan Primera División	11	0	—		2	0	13	0
Guaraní (loan)	2019	Paraguayan Primera División	20	0	—		—		20	0
Guaraní (loan)	2020	Paraguayan Primera División	13	0	—		10	0	23	0
Guaraní (loan)	Total		33	0	0	0	10	0	43	0
Central Córdoba	2022	Argentine Primera División	32	0	1	0	—		33	0
Libertad	2023	Paraguayan Primera División	30	3	4	0	8	0	42	3
Libertad	2024	Paraguayan Primera División	12	1	—		3	0	15	1
Libertad	Total		42	4	4	0	11	0	47	4
Career total			278	14	6	0	51	0	335	6
