= Club Libertad =

Association football club in Paraguay

Libertad
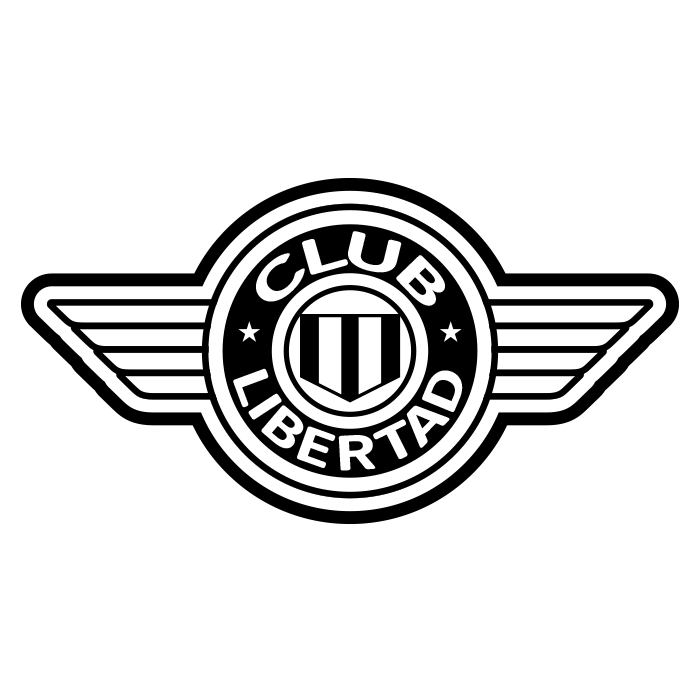
- Full name: Club Libertad
- Nicknames: Gumarelo; Repollero (Cabbage Growers)
- Founded: 30 July 1905; 121 years ago
- Ground: Estadio Tigo La Huerta
- Capacity: 15,000
- Chairman: Rubén di Tore
- Manager: Nelson Haedo Valdez
- League: División de Honor
- 2025: División de Honor, 3rd of 12 (Apertura champions)
- Website: www.clublibertad.com.py
Home colours	Away colours	Third colours

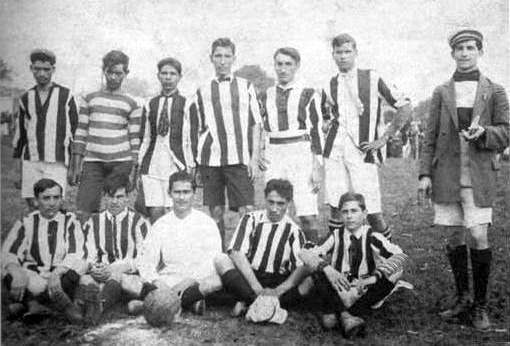
Libertad – Champions 1910

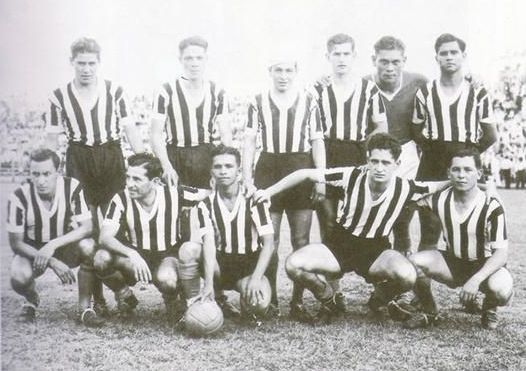
Libertad – Champions 1945

Club Libertad is a Paraguayan professional football club based in Asunción that currently plays in the Paraguayan Primera División. The club plays its home games at Estadio Tigo La Huerta, which holds 15,000 people.

Founded in 1905, Libertad is the third most successful Paraguayan football club, winning 26 national titles, only behind rivals Olimpia and Cerro Porteño.

== History ==
The club was founded on 30 July 1905 by a group of young men and students. Its first president was Juan Manuel Sosa, who chose the club's name.

Since winning its first championship in 1910, Libertad has always been overshadowed by the two big clubs in Paraguay: Olimpia and Cerro Porteño, who together won most of the Paraguayan football national championships. Despite that, Libertad has confirmed its position as the third "big" team of Paraguay by winning 21 championships, ten more than Guaraní, which has eleven.

In 1952, Libertad participated in the Copa Rio. The club played three matches. In the first match against Austria Wien, the opposition won 4–2. In the next match, against Corinthians, the Brazilians won 6–1. In its last game against German club 1. FC Saarbrücken, the Paraguayan club won 4–1, to finish the cup with one win and two defeats.

The club's first participation in the Copa Libertadores was in 1968, where they finished last with one win, one draw and four losses in a group containing Peñarol, Nacional, and Guaraní. In the 1977 Copa Libertadores Libertad reached the semi-finals. They began their campaign by finishing first in their group. That gave them qualification to the semi-finals, where they had to play two legs against Boca Juniors and Deportivo Cali. The winner of the group advanced to the finals, which was Boca Juniors. Libertad finished last of the semi-finals group with one win, one draw and two losses.

In 1998, the club was relegated for the first time in its history. In the Apertura tournament it finished last, and in the Clausura it finished second-to-last. A 4–3 defeat to rivals Guaraní on the last matchday, as well as their league position in 1997, secured the club's relegation. The club spent two years in the second tier before returning to the top tier in 2001 after winning the league title in 2000. The club went through lots of success after their return to the top tier, as noted by winning the league titles in 2002 and 2003.

Libertad reached the semi-finals of Copa Libertadores for the second time in history in 2006, where Libertad topped its group and beat powerhouses Corinthians and River Plate on their way to being knocked out by winners Internacional. Despite the elimination, more success came for the club, because it became a three-time-champion by winning the 2007 Clausura, 2008 Apertura, and 2008 Clausura.

In the 2013 Copa Sudamericana, the club made the semi-finals, beginning their campaign in the first stage by beating Montevideo Wanderers and Mineros in the second stage. Then they beat Sport Recife and Itagüí in the round of 16 and quarter-finals, before being eliminated by Lanús, who eventually won the competition. They also made the semi-finals again in 2017, losing to another Argentine club, Independiente, who also won the competition.

== Rivalries ==
Libertad has a rivalry with the other two "big clubs" of the country, Olimpia and Cerro Porteño, but mainly has one with Olimpia, and matches disputed between the two clubs are called "Clásico Blanco y Negro" (White and Black Classic). The first "clasico" was played in September 1906, with Olimpia winning 5-4. Repollero won the 2003 league title by beating Olimpia 6-5 on penalties. Overall, there have been 255 matches disputed between them, with Olimpia winning 112 and Libertad winning 74.

The club also shares a rivalry with the fourth-biggest club in the country, Guaraní. The first match between the two clubs was played in 1921, which was won by Guarani to obtain the league title that year. The rivalry became greater in 1998, after Guaraní won 4-3 on the last matchday to cause Libertad's only relegation into the second division.

== Performance in CONMEBOL competitions ==
- Copa Libertadores: 20 appearances

Best: Semi-finals (2): 1977, 2006

- Copa Sudamericana: 14 appearances

Best: Semi-finals (3): 2013, 2017, 2021

== Honours ==
Club Libertad honours
Type	Competition	Titles	Seasons
National	Primera División	26	1910, 1917, 1920, 1930, 1943, 1945, 1955, 1976, 2002, 2003, 2006 Apertura, 2007 Clausura, 2008 Apertura, 2008 Clausura, 2010 Clausura, 2012 Clausura, 2014 Apertura, 2014 Clausura, 2016 Apertura, 2017 Apertura, 2021 Apertura, 2022 Apertura, 2023 Apertura, 2023 Clausura, 2024 Apertura, 2025 Apertura
National	División Intermedia	1	2000
National	Copa Paraguay	3	2019, 2023, 2024
National	Supercopa Paraguay	2	2023, 2024
National	Plaqueta Millington Drake	1	1952

- record
- ^{S} shared record

== Current squad ==
Current squad of Club Libertad as of 3 August 2026 (edit)

No.		Position	Player
1	PAR	GK	Ángel González
2	PAR	DF	Alan Benítez
3	PAR	DF	Robert Rojas
4	PAR	DF	Néstor Giménez
5	PAR	DF	Gilberto Flores
6	PAR	MF	Álvaro Campuzano
7	PLE	MF	Agustín Manzur
8	ARG	MF	Federico Carrizo
9	PAR	FW	Gustavo Aguilar
10	PAR	FW	Lorenzo Melgarejo
11	PAR	FW	Elvio Vera
12	PAR	GK	Rodrigo Morínigo
13	PAR	MF	Joaquín Bogarín
14	PAR	FW	Alexis Fretes
17	PAR	DF	Matías Espinoza

No.		Position	Player
19	PAR	FW	Iván Franco
20	PAR	FW	Hugo Fernández
21	PAR	MF	Lucas Sanabria
22	PAR	FW	Pedro Villalba
23	ARG	DF	Nicolás Freire
24	PAR	FW	Rodrigo Villalba
26	PAR	FW	Iván Ramírez
27	PAR	MF	Amín Molinas
28	PAR	FW	Marcelo Fernández
29	PAR	GK	Víctor Rojas
30	PAR	FW	Rodrigo Acuña
31	PAR	DF	Thiago Fernández
32	PAR	DF	Santiago Delvalle
33	PAR	MF	Christian Martínez
34	PAR	DF	Estiven Villalba

Manager: Nelson Valdez

== Managerial history ==
- (Argentina) Gerardo Martino (January 2006 – February 2007)
- (Uruguay) Sergio Markarián (2007 – June 2007)
- (Uruguay) Rubén Israel (July 2007 – December 2008)
- (Argentina) Javier Torrente (2009–2010)
- (Uruguay) Gregorio Pérez (2010–2011)
- (Argentina) Jorge Burruchaga (2011–2012)
- (Uruguay) Rubén Israel (2012–2013)
- (Paraguay) Pedro Sarabia (2 September 2013 – 2016)
- (Spain) Fernando Jubero (December 2016 – 23 December 2017)
- (Paraguay) Aldo Bobadilla (28 December 2017 – 21 July 2018)
- (Paraguay) Eduardo Villalba caretaker (21 July 2018 – 8 October 2018)
- (Colombia) Leonel Álvarez (9 October 2018 – 6 March 2019)
- (Argentina) José Chamot (7 March 2019 – 15 December 2019)
- (Argentina) Ramón Díaz (17 December 2019 – 24 September 2020)
- (Paraguay) Gustavo Morínigo (24 September 2020 – 16 December 2020)
- (Paraguay) Juan Samudio caretaker (16 December 2020 – 23 December 2020)
- (Argentina) Daniel Garnero (30 December 2020 − 20 September 2023)

== Basketball ==
The basketball team of Libertad belongs to the top teams of the national top basketball league and Libertad is after Olimpia the most successful club of Paraguay.

=== Honours ===
- Liga de Baloncesto Metropolitana: 1958, 1972, 1974, 1977, 1979, 1986, 1987, 1990, 2005, 2008, 2009
- Top 5 Profesional: 2008, 2009, 2010
- Liga Nacional de Clubes: 2009
- Súper Copa de Campeones: 2008, 2009
- Liga Femenina de Baloncesto Metropolitana: 1949, 1950, 1951.
