= Matías Espinoza =

Paraguayan footballer (born 1997)

Personal information
- Full name: Matías David Espinoza Acosta
- Date of birth: 19 September 1997 (age 29)
- Place of birth: Asunción, Paraguay
- Height: 1.79 m (5 ft 10 in)
- Position: Left back

Team information
- Current team: Libertad
- Number: 17

Youth career
- Libertad

Senior career*
Years	Team	Apps	(Gls)
2016–	Libertad	198	(16)
2016	→ General Caballero ZC (loan)	33	(4)
2017–2018	→ General Díaz (loan)	26	(4)

International career^{‡}
2019–2024	Paraguay	8	(0)
2020	Paraguay U23	2	(0)
- * Club domestic league appearances and goals as of 12 August 2025 ‡ National team caps and goals as of 23:10, 28 June 2024 (UTC)

Matías David Espinoza Acosta (born 19 August 1997) is a Paraguayan professional footballer who plays as a left back for Libertad and the Paraguay national team.

== Club career ==
A Libertad youth graduate, Espinoza made his senior debut while on loan at General Caballero ZC in 2016. Back to Libertad for the 2017 season, he spent the first half of the campaign playing for the reserves before agreeing to a one-year loan deal with General Díaz in August.

Back to Libertad in June 2018, Espinoza was initially a backup option before establishing himself as a starter in the 2019 season. On 19 March 2020, he renewed his contract with the club.

On 28 December 2023, amidst rumours from a possible move to other clubs, Espinoza renewed his link with Libertad for another four years.

== International career ==
On 3 October 2019, Espinoza was called up to the Paraguay national team by manager Eduardo Berizzo for two friendlies against Serbia and Slovakia. He made his full international debut seven days later, coming on as a second-half substitute for Cristhian Paredes in a 1–0 loss against the former at the Mladost Stadium in Kruševac.

== Career statistics ==
=== Club ===
As of 19 December 2023

Club	Season	League			Cup		Continental		Other		Total	
Club	Season	Division	Apps	Goals	Apps	Goals	Apps	Goals	Apps	Goals	Apps	Goals
General Caballero ZC	2016	Primera División	33	4	—		—		—		33	4
General Díaz	2017	Primera División	7	2	—		—		—		7	2
General Díaz	2018	Primera División	19	2	—		2 (Note: Appearance(s) in Copa Sudamericana)	1	—		21	3
General Díaz	Total		26	4	—		2	1	—		28	5
Libertad	2018	Primera División	13	3	—		2 (Note: Appearance(s) in Copa Libertadores)	0	—		15	3
Libertad	2019	Primera División	31	0	—		6	1	—		37	1
Libertad	2020	Primera División	20	1	—		8	2	—		28	3
Libertad	2021	Primera División	18	1	—		11 (Note: Three appearances in Copa Libertadores, eight appearances in Copa Sudamericana)	0	—		29	1
Libertad	2022	Primera División	30	0	—		3	0	—		33	0
Libertad	2023	Primera División	31	2	4	1	10 (Note: Six appearances in Copa Libertadores, four appearances and one goal in Copa Sudamericana)	1	—		45	4
Libertad	Total		143	7	4	1	40	4	—		187	12
Career total			202	15	4	1	42	5	0	0	248	21

=== International ===
As of 28 June 2024

National team	Year	Apps	Goals
Paraguay	2019	2	0
Paraguay	2023	4	0
Paraguay	2024	2	0
Total		8	0

== Honours ==
Libertad

- Paraguayan Primera División: 2021 Apertura, 2022 Apertura, 2023 Apertura, 2023 Clausura
