= List of Bolivia international footballers =

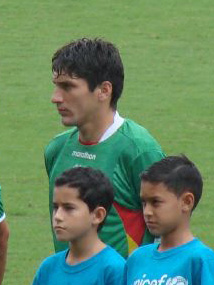
Ronald Raldes is the first player to earn 100 caps for Bolivia.

The Bolivia national football team has represented Bolivia in international football since 1926. Organized by the Bolivian Football Federation, it is one of the 10 members of CONMEBOL. The team's first international was a 7–1 defeat to Chile on 12 October 1926 in the 1926 South American Championship

== Players ==
As of 30 September 2026, after the match against Argentina.

Key
**Bold**	Played for the national team in the past year

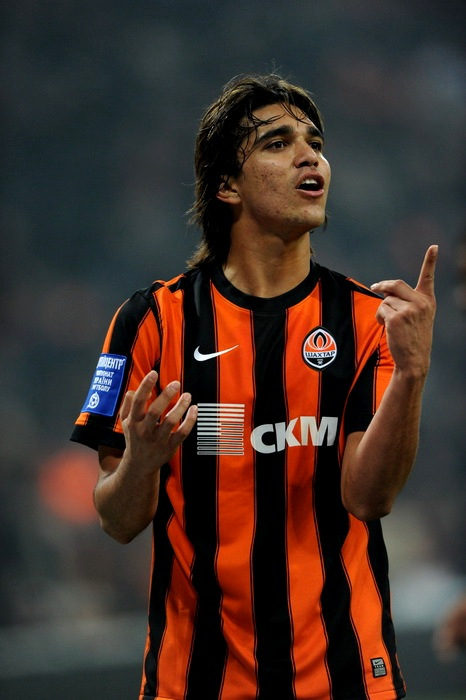
Marcelo Martins Moreno is Bolivia's top goalscorer with 29 goals and the most capped international with 107 caps.

Bolivia national team footballers with at least 20 appearances
No.	Name	National career	Caps	Goals
1	Marcelo Martins Moreno	2007–2023	107	31
2	Ronald Raldes	2001–2018	101	3
3	Marco Sandy	1993–2003	93	6
3	Luis Cristaldo	1989–2005	93	5
4	José Milton Melgar	1980–1997	89	6
5	Carlos Borja	1979–1995	88	1
6	Juan Carlos Arce	2004–2022	87	14
7	Julio César Baldivieso	1991–2005	85	15
7	Juan Manuel Peña	1991–2009	85	1
8	Miguel Rimba	1989–2000	80	0
9	Óscar Sánchez	1994–2006	77	6
10	Jaime Moreno	1991–2008	75	9
11	Marco Etcheverry	1989–2003	71	13
12	**José Sagredo**	2017–	66	1
13	**Carlos Lampe**	2010–	65	0
14	Erwin Sánchez "Platini"	1989–2005	57	15
14	**Roberto Fernández**	2020–	57	1
15	Ramiro Castillo	1989–1997	55	5
15	**Luis Haquín**	2017–	55	2
15	Joselito Vaca	1999–2016	55	2
16	Jhasmani Campos	2007–2020	54	4
16	Limberg Gutiérrez	1997–2009	54	4
17	Leonel Justiniano	2017–2024	53	2
18	Carlos Trucco	1989–1997	51	0
19	Diego Bejarano	2012–2023	50	3
19	Vladimir Soria	1989–2000	50	1
20	**Ramiro Vaca**	2017–	49	5
20	Alejandro Chumacero	2011–2022	49	2
21	Joaquín Botero	1999–2009	48	20
21	Erwin Romero	1977–1989	48	4
21	Ronald García	2000–2013	48	2
22	Víctor Ugarte	1947–1963	45	16
22	Lorgio Álvarez	1999–2011	45	1
22	Luis Alberto Gutiérrez	2007–2017	46	0
23	Milton Coimbra	1996–2005	43	7
23	Rudy Cardozo	2010–2020	43	6
23	Álvaro Peña	1987–1996	43	4
23	Gonzalo Galindo	1998–2007	43	3
24	Rodrigo Ramallo	2013–2024	42	7
25	Marvin Bejarano	2009–2019	41	0
26	Carlos Erwin Arias	2001–2013	40	0
26	**Gabriel Villamíl**	2021–	40	0
26	**Guillermo Viscarra**	2016–	40	0
27	Erwin Saavedra	2015–2024	39	4
28	**Carmelo Algarañaz**	2016–	38	4
29	Mario Ovidio Mezza	1972–1983	37	8
30	William Ramallo	1989–1997	36	9
30	**Miguel Terceros "Miguelito"**	2022–	36	9
30	Iván Castillo	1993–2000	36	0
30	Carlos Jiménez	1973–1981	36	0
30	Adrián Jusino	2019–2024	36	0
30	Luis Gatty Ribeiro	2000–2009	36	0
30	Edward Zenteno	2012–2017	36	0
31	Mauricio Ramos	1987–1999	35	1
31	Rubén Tufiño	1995–2004	35	1
31	**Moisés Villarroel**	2018–	35	1
31	**Diego Medina**	2022–	35	0
32	Miguel Aguilar	1977–1983	34	10
32	Walter Flores	2004–2016	34	1
32	Sergio Castillo	1996–2001	34	0
33	Eduardo Angulo	1973–1981	33	0
34	Marco Antonio Barrero	1987–1999	32	0
34	Danny Bejarano	2013–2023	32	0
35	Carlos Aragonés	1977–1981	31	15
35	Gilbert Álvarez	2009–2021	31	5
35	Gualberto Mojica	2003–2014	31	3
36	Windsor del Llano	1975–1981	30	1
36	Ronald Rivero	2008–2012	30	0
36	Edgar Vaca	1979–1985	30	0
37	Roger Suárez	1996–2004	29	7
37	José Bustamante	1946–1953	29	0
37	Sergio Galarza	2000–2013	29	0
38	Berthy Suárez	1991–1999	28	8
38	**Héctor Cuéllar**	2023–	28	0
39	Wilfredo Camacho	1957–1967	27	5
39	Miguel Ángel Hoyos	2002–2011	27	1
40	Roly Paniagua	1985–1996	26	4
40	Raúl Justiniano	1999–2005	26	1
40	Gustavo Quinteros	1993–1999	26	1
40	Max Ramírez	1957–1965	26	1
40	Fernando Saucedo	2016–2024	26	1
40	Vicente Arraya	1938–1950	26	0
40	José Carlos Fernández	1998–2008	26	0
41	Pablo Escobar	2008–2017	25	6
41	Ausberto García	1957–1967	25	5
41	José Luis Chávez	2008–2014	25	1
41	**Robson Tomé de Araujo "Robson Matheus"**	2024–	25	1
41	Jaime Robles	2008–2011	25	0
42	José Alfredo Castillo	2001–2011	24	6
42	Silvio Rojas	1979–1987	24	5
42	Alberto Achá	1945–1950	24	0
42	Raúl Castro	2014–2020	24	0
42	Diego Wayar	2016–2021	24	0
43	Ramiro Blacut	1963–1972	23	3
43	**Henry Vaca**	2018–	23	1
43	Jairo Quinteros	2021–2024	23	0
43	Mauricio Soria	1995–2002	23	0
43	Modesto Soruco	1991–1994	23	0
44	Máximo Alcócer	1957–1963	22	13
44	Zenón González	1938–1948	22	4
44	**Bruno Miranda**	2016–	22	1
44	Mario Pinedo	1985–1994	22	3
44	Mario Mena	1949–1959	22	2
44	Leonel Reyes	2003–2009	22	2
45	Líder Paz	1999–2005	21	3
45	Augusto Andaveris	2001–2014	21	1
45	Diego Cabrera	2004–2012	21	1
45	Edemir Rodríguez	2007–2016	21	0
45	Ramiro Vargas	1979–1989	21	0
45	Wálter Veizaga	2010–2016	21	0
46	Ramón Guillermo Santos	1953–1959	20	3
46	Percy Colque	2002–2005	20	2
46	Severo Orgaz	1938–1948	20	2
46	Raúl Alberto Morales	1973–1977	20	1
46	Ronald Arana	2001–2007	20	0
46	Eduardo Gutiérrez	1947–1953	20	0
46	Arturo López	1957–1965	20	0
46	Richard Rojas	1999–2004	20	0
