= Bolivia national football team results (1980–1999) =

This page details the match results and statistics of the Bolivia national football team from 1980 to 1999.

== Key ==
Key to matches

- Att.=Match attendance
- (H)=Home ground
- (A)=Away ground
- (N)=Neutral ground

Key to record by opponent

- Pld=Games played
- W=Games won
- D=Games drawn
- L=Games lost
- GF=Goals for
- GA=Goals against

== Results ==
Bolivia's score is shown first in each case.

No.	Date	Venue	Opponents	Score	Competition	Bolivia scorers	Att.	Ref.
130	2 July 1980	Estadio William Bendeck, Santa Cruz de la Sierra (H)	Poland	0–1	Friendly		20,000	
131	26 August 1980	Estadio Hernando Siles, La Paz (H)	Paraguay	1–1	Copa Paz del Chaco	Aguilar	—	
132	28 August 1980	Estadio William Bendeck, Santa Cruz de la Sierra (H)	Paraguay	1–3	Friendly	Aguilar	—	
133	18 September 1980	Asunción (A)	Paraguay	1–2	Copa Paz del Chaco	Aguilar	—	
134	9 November 1980	Cochabamba (H)	Uruguay	1–3	Friendly	Aragonés	—	
135	30 November 1980	Estadio Hernando Siles, La Paz (H)	Finland	3–0	Friendly	Aguilar (2), Del Llano	8,000	
136	4 December 1980	Estadio William Bendeck, Santa Cruz de la Sierra (H)	Finland	2–2	Friendly	Aguilar, D. Paniagua	20,000	
137	11 December 1980	Montevideo (A)	Uruguay	0–5	Friendly		—	
138	25 January 1981	Estadio Hernando Siles, La Paz (H)	Czechoslovakia	2–1	Friendly	Aragonés, Romero	18,000	
139	29 January 1981	Estadio Ramón Tahuichi Aguilera, Santa Cruz de la Sierra (H)	Czechoslovakia	2–5	Friendly	Aragonés, Rojas	20,000	
140	1 February 1981	Estadio Hernando Siles, La Paz (H)	Bulgaria	1–3	Friendly	Aragonés	12,000	
141	15 February 1981	Estadio Hernando Siles, La Paz (H)	Venezuela	3–0	1982 FIFA World Cup qualification	Aguilar, Aragonés, Reynardo	40,000	
142	22 February 1981	Estadio Hernando Siles, La Paz (H)	Brazil	1–2	1982 FIFA World Cup qualification	Aragonés	50,000	
143	15 March 1981	Estadio Olímpico, Caracas (A)	Venezuela	0–1	1982 FIFA World Cup qualification		25,000	
144	22 March 1981	Maracanã Stadium, Rio de Janeiro (A)	Brazil	1–3	1982 FIFA World Cup qualification	Aragonés	121,750	
145	19 July 1983	Estadio Hernando Siles, La Paz (H)	Chile	1–2	Friendly	Borja	—	
146	3 August 1983	Estadio Hernando Siles, La Paz (H)	Paraguay	2–1	Friendly	Taborga, Camacho	—	
147	5 August 1983	Estadio Hernando Siles, La Paz (H)	Paraguay	1–3	Friendly	Rojas	—	
148	14 August 1983	Estadio Hernando Siles, La Paz (H)	Colombia	0–1	1983 Copa América		40,000	
149	21 August 1983	Estadio Hernando Siles, La Paz (H)	Peru	1–1	1983 Copa América	Romero	45,000	
150	24 August 1983	Estadio Carlos Dittborn, Arica (A)	Chile	2–4	Friendly	Salinas, Messa	—	
151	31 August 1983	Estadio El Campín, Bogotá (A)	Colombia	2–2	1983 Copa América	Melgar, Rojas	45,000	
152	4 September 1983	Estadio Nacional, Lima (A)	Peru	1–2	1983 Copa América	D. Paniagua	50,000	
153	3 February 1985	La Paz (H)	East Germany	2–1	Friendly	Unknown	—	
154	6 February 1985	Estadio Hernando Siles, La Paz (H)	Uruguay	0–1	Friendly		20,000	
155	17 February 1985	Lima (A)	Peru	0–3	Friendly		—	
156	21 February 1985	Quito (A)	Ecuador	0–3	Friendly		—	
157	24 February 1985	Caracas (A)	Venezuela	0–5	Friendly		4,000	
158	21 April 1985	Estadio Hernando Siles, La Paz (H)	Venezuela	4–1	Friendly	R. Paniagua (2), Romero (2)	25,000	
159	1 May 1985	Estadio Ramón Tahuichi Aguilera, Santa Cruz de la Sierra (H)	Peru	0–0	Friendly		20,000	
160	26 May 1985	Estadio Ramón Tahuichi Aguilera, Santa Cruz de la Sierra (H)	Paraguay	1–1	1986 FIFA World Cup qualification	Rojas	20,000	
161	2 June 1985	Estadio Ramón Tahuichi Aguilera, Santa Cruz de la Sierra (H)	Brazil	0–2	1986 FIFA World Cup qualification		25,000	
162	9 June 1985	Estadio Defensores del Chaco, Asunción (A)	Paraguay	0–3	1986 FIFA World Cup qualification		40,000	
163	30 June 1985	Estádio do Morumbi, São Paulo (A)	Brazil	1–1	1986 FIFA World Cup qualification	J. C. Sánchez	90,709	
164	14 June 1987	Estadio Hernando Siles, La Paz (H)	Paraguay	0–2	Friendly		—	
165	23 June 1987	Estadio Centenario, Montevideo (A)	Uruguay	1–2	Friendly	Rojas	8,000	
166	28 June 1987	Estadio Gigante de Arroyito, Rosario (N)	Paraguay	0–0	1987 Copa América		5,000	
167	1 July 1987	Estadio Gigante de Arroyito, Rosario (N)	Colombia	0–2	1987 Copa América		5,000	
168	25 May 1989	Estadio Félix Capriles, Cochabamba (H)	Paraguay	3–2	Friendly	Peña, García (2)	30,000	
169	1 June 1989	Asunción (A)	Paraguay	0–2	Friendly		8,000	
170	8 June 1989	Estadio Ramón Tahuichi Aguilera, Santa Cruz de la Sierra (H)	Uruguay	0–0	Friendly		20,000	
171	14 June 1989	Estadio Centenario, Montevideo (A)	Uruguay	0–1	Friendly		10,000	
172	22 June 1989	Estadio Hernando Siles, La Paz (H)	Chile	0–1	Friendly		20,000	
173	27 June 1989	Santiago (A)	Chile	1–2	Friendly	García	15,000	
174	4 June 1989	Estádio Serra Dourada, Goiânia (N)	Uruguay	0–3	1989 Copa América		8,000	
175	6 June 1989	Estádio Serra Dourada, Goiânia (N)	Ecuador	0–0	1989 Copa América		3,000	
176	8 June 1989	Estádio Serra Dourada, Goiânia (N)	Chile	0–5	1989 Copa América		3,000	
177	10 June 1989	Estádio Serra Dourada, Goiânia (N)	Argentina	0–0	1989 Copa América		5,000	
178	20 August 1989	Estadio Hernando Siles, La Paz (H)	Peru	2–1	1990 FIFA World Cup qualification	Melgar, Ramallo	50,000	
179	3 September 1989	Estadio Hernando Siles, La Paz (H)	Uruguay	2–1	1990 FIFA World Cup qualification	Domínguez (o.g.), Peña	52,000	
180	10 September 1989	Estadio Nacional, Lima (A)	Peru	2–1	1990 FIFA World Cup qualification	Ramallo, E. Sánchez	9,500	
181	17 September 1989	Estadio Centenario, Montevideo (A)	Uruguay	0–2	1990 FIFA World Cup qualification		70,000	
182	14 June 1991	Estadio Ramón Tahuichi Aguilera, Santa Cruz de la Sierra (H)	Paraguay	0–1	Copa Paz del Chaco		8,000	
183	16 June 1991	Estadio Defensores del Chaco, Asunción (A)	Paraguay	0–0	Copa Paz del Chaco		5,000	
184	7 July 1991	Estadio Playa Ancha, Valparaíso (N)	Uruguay	1–1	1991 Copa América	Suárez	15,000	
185	9 July 1991	Estadio Sausalito, Viña del Mar (N)	Brazil	1–2	1991 Copa América	E. Sánchez	18,000	
186	11 July 1991	Estadio Sausalito, Viña del Mar (N)	Colombia	0–0	1991 Copa América		15,000	
187	13 July 1991	Estadio Sausalito, Viña del Mar (N)	Ecuador	0–4	1991 Copa América		19,000	
188	29 January 1993	Estadio Félix Capriles, Cochabamba (H)	Honduras	3–1	Friendly	Quinteros, Villarroel (2)	15,000	
189	3 March 1993	Estadio Defensores del Chaco, Asunción (A)	Paraguay	0–1	Copa Paz del Chaco		25,000	
190	12 March 1993	Estadio Cuscatlán, San Salvador (A)	El Salvador	2–2	Friendly	Villarroel, Castillo	10,000	
191	14 March 1993	Estadio General Francisco Morazán, San Pedro Sula (A)	Honduras	0–0	Friendly		12,178	
192	16 March 1993	Estadio Tiburcio Carías Andino, Tegucigalpa (A)	Honduras	0–0	Friendly		8,000	
193	31 March 1993	Estadio Carlos Dittborn, Arica (A)	Chile	1–2	Friendly	Rios	10,000	
194	23 May 1993	Titan Stadium, Fullerton (A)	United States	0–0	Friendly		9,578	
195	27 May 1993	Estadio Félix Capriles, Cochabamba (H)	Paraguay	2–1 (5–3p)	Copa Paz del Chaco	Moreno, Ramallo	—	
196	6 June 1993	Estadio Nacional, Lima (A)	Peru	0–1	Friendly		5,000	
197	13 June 1993	Estadio Hernando Siles, La Paz (H)	Chile	1–3	Friendly	Sandy	—	
198	17 June 1993	Estadio George Capwell, Guayaquil (N)	Argentina	0–1	1993 Copa América		16,000	
199	20 June 1993	Estadio 9 de Mayo, Machala (N)	Colombia	1–1	1993 Copa América	Etcheverry	11,000	
200	23 June 1993	Estadio Reales Tamarindos, Portoviejo (N)	Mexico	0–0	1993 Copa América		20,000	
201	18 July 1993	Polideportivo Cachamay, Ciudad Guayana (A)	Venezuela	7–1	1994 FIFA World Cup qualification	E. Sánchez (3), Ramallo (3), Cristaldo	125,000	
202	25 July 1993	Estadio Hernando Siles, La Paz (H)	Brazil	2–0	1994 FIFA World Cup qualification	Etcheverry, Peña	45,000	
203	8 August 1993	Estadio Hernando Siles, La Paz (H)	Uruguay	3–1	1994 FIFA World Cup qualification	E. Sánchez, Etcheverry, Melgar	45,000	
204	15 August 1993	Estadio Hernando Siles, La Paz (H)	Ecuador	1–0	1994 FIFA World Cup qualification	Ramallo	35,000	
205	22 August 1993	Estadio Hernando Siles, La Paz (H)	Venezuela	7–0	1994 FIFA World Cup qualification	Ramallo, Melgar (2), E. Sánchez, Sandy, Etcheverry	35,000	
206	29 August 1993	Estádio do Arruda, Recife (A)	Brazil	0–6	1994 FIFA World Cup qualification		76,636	
207	12 September 1993	Estadio Centenario, Montevideo (A)	Uruguay	1–2	1994 FIFA World Cup qualification	Ramallo	65,000	
208	19 September 1993	Estadio Monumental, Guayaquil (A)	Ecuador	1–1	1994 FIFA World Cup qualification	Ramallo	1,000	
209	18 February 1994	Joe Robbie Stadium, Miami Gardens (N)	United States	1–1	Joe Robbie Cup	Moreno	15,676	
210	20 February 1994	Joe Robbie Stadium, Miami Gardens (N)	Colombia	0–2	Joe Robbie Cup		20,171	
211	26 March 1994	Cotton Bowl, Dallas (A)	United States	2–2	Friendly	Baldivieso, Pinedo	26,835	
212	7 April 1994	Estadio Manuel Calle Lombana, Villavicencio (A)	Colombia	1–0	Friendly	Pinedo	16,000	
213	20 April 1994	Stadionul Steaua, Bucharest (A)	Romania	0–3	Friendly		13,000	
214	4 May 1994	Stade Pierre de Coubertin, Cannes (N)	Saudi Arabia	1–0	Friendly	E. Sánchez	700	
215	11 May 1994	Spyros Louis Stadium, Athens (N)	Cameroon	1–1	Friendly	Peña	600	
216	13 May 1994	Karaiskakis Stadium, Piraeus (A)	Greece	0–0	Friendly		2,661	
217	19 May 1994	Laugardalsvöllur, Reykjavík (A)	Iceland	0–1	Friendly		27,070	
218	24 May 1994	Lansdowne Road, Dublin (A)	Republic of Ireland	0–1	Friendly		32,500	
219	8 June 1994	Estadio Ramón Tahuichi Aguilera, Santa Cruz de la Sierra (H)	Peru	0–0	Friendly		35,000	
220	11 June 1994	Complexe sportif Claude-Robillard, Montreal (N)	Switzerland	0–0	Friendly		4,655	
221	17 June 1994	Soldier Field, Chicago (N)	Germany	0–1	1994 FIFA World Cup		63,117	
222	23 June 1994	Foxboro Stadium, Foxborough (N)	South Korea	0–0	1994 FIFA World Cup		54,453	
223	27 June 1994	Soldier Field, Chicago (N)	Spain	1–3	1994 FIFA World Cup	E. Sánchez	63,089	
224	21 September 1994	Estadio Nacional, Santiago (A)	Chile	2–1	Friendly	Ramallo, Pineda	—	
225	3 April 1995	Estadio Ramón Tahuichi Aguilera, Santa Cruz de la Sierra (H)	Venezuela	0–0	Friendly		—	
226	14 May 1995	Estadio Félix Capriles, Cochabamba (H)	Paraguay	1–1	Copa Paz del Chaco	Melgar	35,000	
227	9 June 1995	Estadio Manuel Ferreira, Asunción (A)	Paraguay	0–0 (3–4p)	Copa Paz del Chaco		7,000	
228	18 June 1995	Estadio José Alberto Pérez, Valera (A)	Venezuela	3–1	Friendly	Cristaldo, Angola, Baldivieso	14,000	
229	1 July 1995	National University of San Marcos, Lima (A)	Peru	1–4	Friendly	Sandy	6,362	
230	8 July 1995	Estadio Parque Artigas, Paysandú (N)	Argentina	1–2	1995 Copa América	Angola	20,000	
231	11 July 1995	Estadio Parque Artigas, Paysandú (N)	United States	1–0	1995 Copa América	Etcheverry	16,000	
232	14 July 1995	Estadio Parque Artigas, Paysandú (N)	Chile	2–2	1995 Copa América	Mercado, Ramos	11,000	
233	16 July 1995	Estadio Centenario, Montevideo (N)	Uruguay	1–2	1995 Copa América	Ó. Sánchez	45,000	
234	25 October 1995	Estadio Ramón Tahuichi Aguilera, Santa Cruz de la Sierra (H)	Ecuador	2–2	Friendly	Etcheverry, Ó. Sánchez	30,000	
235	30 January 1996	Estadio Ramón Tahuichi Aguilera, Santa Cruz de la Sierra (H)	Slovakia	2–0	Friendly	Tufiño, Paniagua	35,000	
236	4 February 1996	Estadio Félix Capriles, Cochabamba (H)	Chile	1–1	Friendly	Suárez	24,130	
237	11 February 1996	Estadio Nacional, Lima (A)	Peru	3–1	Friendly	Baldivieso, R. Paniagua, Castillo	10,000	
238	14 February 1996	Estadio Olímpico Patria, Sucre (H)	Paraguay	4–1	Friendly	Castillo, Tufiño, Suárez, Etcheverry	8,000	
239	7 March 1996	Estadio Ramón Tahuichi Aguilera, Santa Cruz de la Sierra (H)	Peru	2–0	Friendly	Coimbra (2)	—	
240	28 March 1996	Atanasio Girardot Sports Complex, Medellín (A)	Colombia	1–4	Friendly	Tufiño	26,000	
241	24 April 1996	Estadio Monumental, Buenos Aires (A)	Argentina	1–3	1998 FIFA World Cup qualification	Baldivieso	49,750	
242	5 May 1996	Washington, D.C. (N)	El Salvador	1–1	Friendly	Suárez	4,000	
243	24 May 1996	Estadio Nacional, Santiago (A)	Chile	0–2	Friendly		25,000	
244	8 June 1996	Cotton Bowl, Dallas (N)	Mexico	0–1	1996 U.S. Cup		25,187	
245	12 June 1996	RFK Stadium, Washington, D.C. (N)	United States	2–0	1996 U.S. Cup	Moreno, Coimbra	19,350	
246	15 June 1996	Giants Stadium, East Rutherford (N)	Republic of Ireland	0–3	1996 U.S. Cup		14,624	
247	7 July 1996	Estadio Hernando Siles, La Paz (H)	Venezuela	6–1	1998 FIFA World Cup qualification	Sandy, Etcheverry, Baldivieso, Coimbra, Suárez, Paniagua	43,822	
248	26 July 1996	Estadio General Pablo Rojas, Asunción (A)	Paraguay	0–2	Friendly		8,000	
249	1 September 1996	Estadio Hernando Siles, La Paz (H)	Peru	0–0	1998 FIFA World Cup qualification		48,304	
250	8 October 1996	Estadio Centenario, Montevideo (A)	Uruguay	0–1	1998 FIFA World Cup qualification		65,000	
251	10 November 1996	Estadio Hernando Siles, La Paz (H)	Colombia	2–2	1998 FIFA World Cup qualification	Sandy, Moreno	43,173	
252	15 December 1996	Estadio Hernando Siles, La Paz (H)	Paraguay	0–0	1998 FIFA World Cup qualification		45,000	
253	12 January 1997	Estadio Hernando Siles, La Paz (H)	Ecuador	2–0	1998 FIFA World Cup qualification	Moreno, Etcheverry	37,000	
254	2 February 1997	Estadio Hernando Siles, La Paz (H)	Slovakia	0–1	Friendly		30,000	
255	12 February 1997	Estadio Hernando Siles, La Paz (H)	Chile	1–1	1998 FIFA World Cup qualification	Soria	41,908	
256	23 March 1997	Estadio Jesús Bermúdez, Oruro (H)	Jamaica	6–0	Friendly	Ó. Sánchez (2), Blanco (2), Suárez (2)	5,000	
257	2 April 1997	Estadio Hernando Siles, La Paz (H)	Argentina	2–1	1998 FIFA World Cup qualification	Sandy, Ochoaizpur	44,372	
258	8 June 1997	Estadio Luis Loreto Lira, Valera (A)	Venezuela	1–1	1998 FIFA World Cup qualification	Castillo	3,352	
259	12 June 1997	Estadio Hernando Siles, La Paz (N)	Venezuela	1–0	1997 Copa América	Coimbra	40,000	
260	15 June 1997	Estadio Hernando Siles, La Paz (N)	Peru	2–0	1997 Copa América	Etcheverry, Baldivieso	—	
261	18 June 1997	Estadio Hernando Siles, La Paz (N)	Uruguay	1–0	1997 Copa América	Baldivieso	30,000	
262	21 June 1997	Estadio Hernando Siles, La Paz (N)	Colombia	2–1	1997 Copa América	Etcheverry, E. Sánchez	30,000	
263	25 June 1997	Estadio Hernando Siles, La Paz (N)	Mexico	3–1	1997 Copa América	E. Sánchez, Castillo, Moreno	40,000	
264	29 June 1997	Estadio Hernando Siles, La Paz (N)	Brazil	1–3	1997 Copa América	E. Sánchez	46,000	
265	6 July 1997	Estadio Nacional, Lima (A)	Peru	1–2	1998 FIFA World Cup qualification	Cristaldo	31,489	
266	20 July 1997	Estadio Hernando Siles, La Paz (H)	Uruguay	1–0	1998 FIFA World Cup qualification	Etcheverry	27,874	
267	20 August 1997	Estadio Metropolitano, Barranquilla (A)	Colombia	0–3	1998 FIFA World Cup qualification		25,912	
268	10 September 1997	Estadio Defensores del Chaco, Asunción (A)	Paraguay	1–2	1998 FIFA World Cup qualification	Suárez	40,341	
269	12 October 1997	Estadio Monumental, Guayaquil (A)	Ecuador	0–1	1998 FIFA World Cup qualification		14,568	
270	16 November 1997	Estadio Nacional, Santiago (A)	Chile	0–3	1998 FIFA World Cup qualification		74,777	
271	24 January 1999	Estadio Ramón Tahuichi Aguilera, Santa Cruz de la Sierra (H)	United States	0–0	Friendly		40,000	
272	3 March 1999	Estadio Mateo Flores, Guatemala City (N)	Jamaica	0–0	Copa de la Paz		15,000	
273	5 March 1999	Estadio Mateo Flores, Guatemala City (N)	Guatemala	3–0	Copa de la Paz	Ochoaizpur, Coimbra, Sandy	10,000	
274	7 March 1999	Estadio Mateo Flores, Guatemala City (N)	Paraguay	0–3	Copa de la Paz		10,000	
275	11 March 1999	Los Angeles Memorial Coliseum, Los Angeles (N)	Mexico	1–2	1999 U.S. Cup	Ochoaizpur	34,154	
276	13 March 1999	San Diego Stadium, San Diego (N)	Guatemala	1–2	1999 U.S. Cup	Miranda (o.g.)	50,324	
277	28 April 1999	Estadio Félix Capriles, Cochabamba (H)	Chile	1–1	Friendly	Antelo	35,000	
278	20 June 1999	Estadio Nacional, Santiago (A)	Chile	0–1	Friendly		25,000	
279	29 June 1999	Estadio Defensores del Chaco, Asunción (N)	Paraguay	0–0	1999 Copa América		42,000	
280	2 July 1999	Estadio Defensores del Chaco, Asunción (N)	Peru	0–1	1999 Copa América		30,000	
281	5 July 1999	Monumental Río Parapití, Pedro Juan Caballero (N)	Japan	1–1	1999 Copa América	E. Sánchez	20,000	
282	25 July 1999	Estadio Azteca, Mexico City (N)	Egypt	2–2	1999 FIFA Confederations Cup	Gutiérrez, Ribera	85,000	
283	27 July 1999	Estadio Azteca, Mexico City (N)	Saudi Arabia	0–0	1999 FIFA Confederations Cup		65,000	
284	29 July 1999	Estadio Azteca, Mexico City (N)	Mexico	0–1	1999 FIFA Confederations Cup		55,000	
285	25 August 1999	Estadio Olímpico Patria, Sucre (H)	Venezuela	0–0	Friendly		11,376	
286	3 November 1999	Estadio Nueva España, Buenos Aires (N)	Paraguay	0–0	Copa Paz del Chaco		—	

== Record by opponent ==
Team	Pld	W	D	L	GF	GA	GD	WPCT
Argentina	5	1	1	3	4	7	−3	20.00
Brazil	8	1	1	6	7	19	−12	12.50
Bulgaria	1	0	0	1	1	3	−2	0.00
Cameroon	1	0	1	0	1	1	0	0.00
Chile	15	1	4	10	13	31	−18	6.67
Colombia	11	2	4	5	9	18	−9	18.18
Czechoslovakia	2	1	0	1	4	6	−2	50.00
East Germany	1	1	0	0	2	1	+1	100.00
Ecuador	8	2	3	3	6	11	−5	25.00
Egypt	1	0	1	0	2	2	0	0.00
El Salvador	2	0	2	0	3	3	0	0.00
Finland	2	1	1	0	5	2	+3	50.00
Germany	1	0	0	1	0	1	−1	0.00
Greece	1	0	1	0	0	0	0	0.00
Guatemala	2	1	0	1	4	2	+2	50.00
Honduras	3	1	2	0	3	1	+2	33.33
Iceland	1	0	0	1	0	1	−1	0.00
Jamaica	2	1	1	0	6	0	+6	50.00
Japan	1	0	1	0	1	1	0	0.00
Mexico	5	1	1	3	4	5	−1	20.00
Paraguay	24	4	9	11	18	35	−17	16.67
Peru	15	5	4	6	15	17	−2	33.33
Poland	1	0	0	1	0	1	−1	0.00
Republic of Ireland	2	0	0	2	0	4	−4	0.00
Romania	1	0	0	1	0	3	−3	0.00
Saudi Arabia	2	1	1	0	1	0	+1	50.00
Slovakia	1	0	0	1	0	1	−1	0.00
South Korea	1	0	1	0	0	0	0	0.00
Spain	1	0	0	1	1	3	−2	0.00
Switzerland	1	0	1	0	0	0	0	0.00
United States	6	2	4	0	6	3	+3	33.33
Uruguay	16	4	2	10	12	25	−13	25.00
Venezuela	12	7	3	2	32	11	+21	58.33
Total	156	37	49	70	160	218	−58	23.72

Source: Results
