= 2024 Copa América Group C =

Soccer tournament group

Group C of the 2024 Copa América was one of four groups in the first stage of the tournament. The tournament involved national teams from CONMEBOL (South America) but also includes invited teams from the CONCACAF region (North, Central America and the Caribbean), that qualified via the 2023–24 CONCACAF Nations League.

The group was made up of the hosts United States from CONCACAF, Uruguay from CONMEBOL, Panama from CONCACAF, and Bolivia from CONMEBOL. The draw for the groups was conducted on December 7, 2023, with the United States being previously seeded into the group. The group's matches took place from June 23 to July 1 at six venues in six U.S. cities.

The top two teams, following a round-robin of three matches per team, advanced to the quarter-finals.

== Teams ==
Draw position	Team	Pot	Confederation	Method of qualification	Appearances		Previous best performance	FIFA Rankings	
Draw position	Team	Pot	Confederation	Method of qualification	Total	Last	Previous best performance	November 2023 (Note: The rankings of November 2023 were used for seeding for the final draw, except for certain cases.)	June 2024
C1 (seed)	United States	1	CONCACAF	2023–24 CNL A semifinalist	5th	2016	Fourth place (1995 and 2016)	12	11
C2	Uruguay	2	CONMEBOL	Automatic qualifier	46th	2021	Winners (15 times, last in 2011)	11	14
C3	Panama	3	CONCACAF	2023–24 CNL A semifinalist	2nd	2016	Group stage (2016)	41	43
C4	Bolivia	4	CONMEBOL	Automatic qualifier	29th	2021	Winners (1963)	85	84

== Standings ==
Pos	Team	Pld	W	D	L	GF	GA	GD	Pts	Qualification
1	Uruguay	3	3	0	0	9	1	+8	9	Advance to knockout stage
2	Panama	3	2	0	1	6	5	+1	6	Advance to knockout stage
3	United States (H)	3	1	0	2	3	3	0	3	
4	Bolivia	3	0	0	3	1	10	−9	0	

Source: CONMEBOL
Rules for classification: Tiebreakers
(H) Hosts

In the quarter-finals:

- The winners of Group C, Uruguay, advanced to play the runners-up of Group D, Brazil.
- The runners-up of Group C, Panama, advanced to play the winners of Group D, Colombia.

== Matches ==
All kick-off times are local times, as listed by CONMEBOL.

=== United States vs Bolivia ===
The two teams had met eight times previously, including Bolivia's 1–0 group stage victory at the 1995 Copa América. The other seven matches were all friendlies, the most recent in 2018 with a 3–0 win for the United States.

June 23, 2024
5:00 pm CDT (UTC−5)

United States	2–0	Bolivia
Pulisic 3'; Balogun 44'	Report (CONMEBOL); Report (CONCACAF)

AT&T Stadium, Arlington, Texas
Attendance: 47,873
Referee: Maurizio Mariani (Italy)

United States	Bolivia

GK	1	Matt Turner
RB	22	Joe Scally
CB	3	Chris Richards
CB	13	Tim Ream
LB	5	Antonee Robinson
DM	4	Tyler Adams		(substituted off) 46'
CM	8	Weston McKennie	(yellow card) 49'	(substituted off) 78'
CM	7	Giovanni Reyna		(substituted off) 65'
RF	21	Timothy Weah		(substituted off) 86'
CF	20	Folarin Balogun		(substituted off) 65'
LF	10	Christian Pulisic (c)
Substitutions:
MF	6	Yunus Musah		(substituted on) 46'
FW	9	Ricardo Pepi		(substituted on) 65'
MF	15	Johnny Cardoso		(substituted on) 65'
MF	14	Luca de la Torre		(substituted on) 78'
FW	11	Brenden Aaronson		(substituted on) 86'
Manager:
Gregg Berhalter

GK	23	Guillermo Viscarra
CB	2	Jesús Sagredo
CB	4	Luis Haquín (c)	(yellow card) 31'
CB	21	José Sagredo
DM	6	Leonel Justiniano	(yellow card) 27'	(substituted off) 46'
CM	20	Fernando Saucedo
CM	15	Gabriel Villamil	(yellow card) 28'
RW	3	Diego Medina		(substituted off) 46'
LW	17	Roberto Fernández		(substituted off) 75'
CF	9	César Menacho		(substituted off) 46'
CF	19	Bruno Miranda		(substituted off) 68'
Substitutions:
MF	7	Miguel Terceros		(substituted on) 46'
FW	18	Rodrigo Ramallo		(substituted on) 46'
MF	22	Héctor Cuéllar		(substituted on) 46'
FW	11	Carmelo Algarañaz		(substituted on) 68'
MF	10	Ramiro Vaca		(substituted on) 75'
Manager:
(Brazil) Antônio Carlos Zago

Man of the Match:
Christian Pulisic (United States)

Assistant referees:
Daniele Bindoni (Italy)
Alberto Tegoni (Italy)
Fourth official:
Jhon Ospina (Colombia)
Fifth official:
Jhon Gallego (Colombia)
Video assistant referee:
Marco Di Bello (Italy)
Assistant video assistant referee:
Aleandro Di Paolo (Italy)

=== Uruguay vs Panama ===
The two teams had met in four previous matches, all in friendlies and all won by the Uruguayans with the most recent being a 5–0 victory in 2022.

June 23, 2024
9:00 pm EDT (UTC−4)

Uruguay	3–1	Panama
M. Araújo 16'; Núñez 85'; Viña 90+1'	Report (CONMEBOL); Report (CONCACAF)	Murillo 90+5'

Hard Rock Stadium, Miami Gardens, Florida
Attendance: 33,425
Referee: Piero Maza (Chile)

Uruguay	Panama

GK	1	Sergio Rochet
RB	8	Nahitan Nández
CB	4	Ronald Araújo	(substituted off) 46'
CB	16	Mathías Olivera	(substituted off) 60'
LB	17	Matías Viña
CM	15	Federico Valverde (c)	(substituted off) 84'
CM	5	Manuel Ugarte
RW	11	Facundo Pellistri
AM	10	Giorgian de Arrascaeta	(substituted off) 60'
LW	20	Maximiliano Araújo
CF	19	Darwin Núñez
Substitutions:
DF	2	José Giménez	(substituted on) 46'
MF	7	Nicolás de la Cruz	(substituted on) 60'
DF	3	Sebastián Cáceres	(substituted on) 60'
MF	6	Rodrigo Bentancur	(substituted on) 84'
Manager:
(Argentina) Marcelo Bielsa

GK	22	Orlando Mosquera
CB	24	Edgardo Fariña
CB	3	José Córdoba
CB	25	Roderick Miller
RWB	23	Michael Amir Murillo
LWB	15	Eric Davis (c)
RM	7	José Luis Rodríguez		(substituted off) 84'
CM	6	Cristian Martínez		(substituted off) 65'
CM	8	Adalberto Carrasquilla		(substituted off) 89'
LM	10	Yoel Bárcenas		(substituted off) 89'
CF	17	José Fajardo		(substituted off) 84'
Substitutions:
MF	14	Jovani Welch	(yellow card) 68'	(substituted on) 65'
FW	9	Eduardo Guerrero		(substituted on) 84'
MF	13	Freddy Góndola		(substituted on) 84'
MF	5	Abdiel Ayarza		(substituted on) 89'
MF	26	Kahiser Lenis		(substituted on) 89'
Manager:
(Spain) Thomas Christiansen

Man of the Match:
Maximiliano Araújo (Uruguay)

Assistant referees:
Claudio Urrutia (Chile)
Miguel Rocha (Chile)
Fourth official:
Juan Gabriel Benítez (Paraguay)
Fifth official:
Eduardo Cardozo (Paraguay)
Video assistant referee:
Mauro Vigliano (Argentina)
Assistant video assistant referee:
Héctor Paletta (Argentina)

=== Panama vs United States ===
The two teams had faced each other 26 times previously but this will be the first time at the Copa América. Their most recent meeting was a 1–1 semifinals draw in the 2023 CONCACAF Gold Cup at Snapdragon Stadium, San Diego, California, with Panama prevailing 5–4 on penalties.

Prior to the match, Panama suffered the loss of midfielder José Luis Rodríguez for the remainder of the tournament due to injury.

June 27, 2024
6:00 pm EDT (UTC−4)

Panama	2–1	United States
Blackman 26'; Fajardo 83'	Report (CONMEBOL); Report (CONCACAF)	Balogun 22'

Mercedes-Benz Stadium, Atlanta, Georgia
Attendance: 59,145
Referee: Iván Barton (El Salvador)

Panama	United States

GK	22	Orlando Mosquera
CB	24	Edgardo Fariña	(yellow card) 90+2'
CB	3	José Córdoba
CB	25	Roderick Miller
RWB	23	Michael Amir Murillo
LWB	15	Eric Davis (c)
RM	2	César Blackman		(substituted off) 60'
CM	6	Cristian Martínez		(substituted off) 76'
CM	8	Adalberto Carrasquilla	(red card) 88'
LM	10	Yoel Bárcenas
CF	9	Eduardo Guerrero	(yellow card) 45'	(substituted off) 46'
Substitutions:
FW	17	José Fajardo		(substituted on) 46'
MF	13	Freddy Góndola	(yellow card) 90+3'	(substituted on) 60'
MF	5	Abdiel Ayarza		(substituted on) 76'
Manager:
(Spain) Thomas Christiansen

GK	1	Matt Turner		(substituted off) 46'
RB	22	Joe Scally
CB	3	Chris Richards	(yellow card) 89'
CB	13	Tim Ream		(substituted off) 86'
LB	5	Antonee Robinson	(yellow card) 33'
CM	8	Weston McKennie
CM	4	Tyler Adams		(substituted off) 46'
CM	7	Giovanni Reyna		(substituted off) 46'
RF	21	Timothy Weah	(red card) 18'
CF	20	Folarin Balogun		(substituted off) 72'
LF	10	Christian Pulisic (c)
Substitutions:
GK	18	Ethan Horvath		(substituted on) 46'
DF	2	Cameron Carter-Vickers		(substituted on) 46'
MF	15	Johnny Cardoso		(substituted on) 46'
FW	9	Ricardo Pepi		(substituted on) 72'
FW	26	Josh Sargent		(substituted on) 86'
Manager:
Gregg Berhalter

Man of the Match:
Folarin Balogun (United States)

Assistant referees:
David Morán (El Salvador)
Henri Pupiro (Nicaragua)
Fourth official:
Kevin Ortega (Peru)
Fifth official:
Stephen Atoche (Peru)
Video assistant referee:
Tatiana Guzmán (Nicaragua)
Assistant video assistant referee:
David Rodríguez (Colombia)

=== Uruguay vs Bolivia ===
The two teams had faced each other in 46 previous matches, including 16 times in the Copa América with Uruguay largely dominating with 13 matches won to just two wins for Bolivia plus one draw. Their most recent meeting was a 3–0 home win for Uruguay in the 2026 FIFA World Cup qualification in November 2023.

June 27, 2024
9:00 pm EDT (UTC−4)

Uruguay	5–0	Bolivia
Pellistri 8'; Núñez 21'; M. Araújo 77'; Valverde 81'; Bentancur 89'	Report (CONMEBOL); Report (CONCACAF)

MetLife Stadium, East Rutherford, New Jersey
Attendance: 48,033
Referee: Juan Gabriel Benítez (Paraguay)

Uruguay	Bolivia

GK	1	Sergio Rochet
RB	8	Nahitan Nández
CB	4	Ronald Araújo
CB	16	Mathías Olivera
LB	17	Matías Viña	(substituted off) 82'
CM	5	Manuel Ugarte
CM	15	Federico Valverde (c)	(substituted off) 86'
RW	11	Facundo Pellistri	(substituted off) 86'
AM	7	Nicolás de la Cruz	(substituted off) 89'
LW	20	Maximiliano Araújo
CF	19	Darwin Núñez	(substituted off) 83'
Substitutions:
DF	24	Lucas Olaza	(substituted on) 82'
FW	9	Luis Suárez	(substituted on) 83'
FW	25	Cristian Olivera	(substituted on) 86'
MF	6	Rodrigo Bentancur	(substituted on) 86'
MF	10	Giorgian de Arrascaeta	(substituted on) 89'
Manager:
(Argentina) Marcelo Bielsa

GK	23	Guillermo Viscarra
CB	22	Héctor Cuéllar
CB	4	Luis Haquín (c)
CB	21	José Sagredo
RM	25	Yomar Rocha	(yellow card) 65'	(substituted off) 74'
CM	16	Boris Céspedes
CM	15	Gabriel Villamil
LM	17	Roberto Fernández		(substituted off) 46'
RF	7	Miguel Terceros		(substituted off) 68'
CF	11	Carmelo Algarañaz		(substituted off) 82'
LF	10	Ramiro Vaca		(substituted off) 74'
Substitutions:
DF	24	Marcelo Suárez		(substituted on) 46'
FW	13	Lucas Chávez		(substituted on) 68'
FW	8	Jaume Cuéllar		(substituted on) 74'
DF	3	Diego Medina		(substituted on) 74'
MF	26	Adalid Terrazas		(substituted on) 82'
Manager:
(Brazil) Antônio Carlos Zago

Man of the Match:
Maximiliano Araújo (Uruguay)

Assistant referees:
Eduardo Cardozo (Paraguay)
Milcíades Saldívar (Paraguay)
Fourth official:
Edina Alves (Brazil)
Fifth official:
Migdalia Rodríguez (Venezuela)
Video assistant referee:
Rodrigo Carvajal (Chile)
Assistant video assistant referee:
José Cuevas (Paraguay)

=== United States vs Uruguay ===
The two teams had met eight times previously, (Note: The match between Uruguay and the United States in the 1924 Summer Olympics football tournament is included, although it is not considered an international "A" match by FIFA.) including Uruguay's 1–0 group stage victory at the 1993 Copa América. Their most recent meeting was a friendly game in June 2022 which ended in a goalless draw.

The match was decided by a controversial goal from Mathías Olivera. Panama's win in the other match, along with this loss, sealed the United States’ first ever group stage elimination from a major international tournament they hosted. In addition, they became the first Copa América hosts to be eliminated in the group stage since the format was first implemented in 1975.

July 1, 2024
8:00 pm CDT (UTC−5)

United States	0–1	Uruguay
	Report (CONMEBOL); Report (CONCACAF)	M. Olivera 66'

Arrowhead Stadium, Kansas City, Missouri
Attendance: 55,460
Referee: Kevin Ortega (Peru)

United States	Uruguay

GK	1	Matt Turner
RB	22	Joe Scally		(substituted off) 79'
CB	3	Chris Richards	(yellow card) 33'
CB	13	Tim Ream		(substituted off) 89'
LB	5	Antonee Robinson
CM	8	Weston McKennie
CM	4	Tyler Adams	(yellow card) 17'
CM	6	Yunus Musah		(substituted off) 72'
RF	10	Christian Pulisic (c)
CF	20	Folarin Balogun		(substituted off) 41'
LF	7	Giovanni Reyna
Substitutions:
FW	9	Ricardo Pepi		(substituted on) 41'
FW	26	Josh Sargent		(substituted on) 72'
FW	19	Haji Wright		(substituted on) 79'
MF	17	Malik Tillman		(substituted on) 89'
Manager:
Gregg Berhalter

GK	1	Sergio Rochet
RB	8	Nahitan Nández
CB	4	Ronald Araújo
CB	16	Mathías Olivera
LB	17	Matías Viña		(substituted off) 72'
CM	5	Manuel Ugarte		(substituted off) 88'
CM	15	Federico Valverde (c)
RW	11	Facundo Pellistri
AM	7	Nicolás de la Cruz		(substituted off) 79'
LW	20	Maximiliano Araújo		(substituted off) 27'
CF	19	Darwin Núñez	(yellow card) 45+3'	(substituted off) 88'
Substitutions:
FW	26	Cristian Olivera		(substituted on) 27'
DF	2	José Giménez		(substituted on) 72'
MF	6	Rodrigo Bentancur		(substituted on) 79'
DF	3	Sebastián Cáceres		(substituted on) 88'
FW	9	Luis Suárez		(substituted on) 88'
Manager:
(Argentina) Marcelo Bielsa

Man of the Match:
Mathías Olivera (Uruguay)

Assistant referees:
Michael Orué (Peru)
Stephen Atoche (Peru)
Fourth official:
Augusto Menéndez (Peru)
Fifth official:
José Antelo (Bolivia)
Video assistant referee:
Carlos Orbe (Ecuador)
Assistant video assistant referee:
Bryan Loayza (Ecuador)

=== Bolivia vs Panama ===
The two teams had met six times previously, including Panama's 2–1 group stage victory at the Copa América Centenario in 2016. The other five matches were all friendlies, the most recent in August 2023 with a 2–1 away win for Panama.

July 1, 2024
9:00 pm EDT (UTC−4)

Bolivia	1–3	Panama
Miranda 69'	Report (CONMEBOL); Report (CONCACAF)	Fajardo 22'; Guerrero 79'; Yanis 90+1'

Inter&Co Stadium, Orlando, Florida
Attendance: 16,129
Referee: Edina Alves (Brazil)

Bolivia	Panama

GK	23	Guillermo Viscarra
CB	22	Héctor Cuéllar
CB	4	Luis Haquín (c)
CB	24	Marcelo Suárez
RM	25	Yomar Rocha		(substituted off) 63'
CM	16	Boris Céspedes		(substituted off) 63'
CM	15	Gabriel Villamil	(yellow card) 21'	(substituted off) 63'
LM	21	José Sagredo
AM	7	Miguel Terceros		(substituted off) 81'
AM	10	Ramiro Vaca		(substituted off) 81'
CF	11	Carmelo Algarañaz
Substitutions:
FW	19	Bruno Miranda		(substituted on) 63'
MF	26	Adalid Terrazas	(yellow card) 86'	(substituted on) 63'
MF	6	Leonel Justiniano		(substituted on) 63'
MF	20	Fernando Saucedo		(substituted on) 81'
FW	13	Lucas Chávez		(substituted on) 81'
Manager:
(Brazil) Antônio Carlos Zago

GK	22	Orlando Mosquera
CB	24	Edgardo Fariña
CB	3	José Córdoba
CB	16	Carlos Harvey		(substituted off) 74'
RWB	23	Michael Amir Murillo	(yellow card) 42'	(substituted off) 46'
LWB	15	Eric Davis (c)
RM	2	César Blackman
CM	6	Cristian Martínez		(substituted off) 74'
CM	14	Jovani Welch		(substituted off) 90'
LM	10	Yoel Bárcenas
CF	17	José Fajardo		(substituted off) 84'
Substitutions:
MF	26	Kahiser Lenis		(substituted on) 46'
MF	5	Abdiel Ayarza		(substituted on) 74'
FW	9	Eduardo Guerrero		(substituted on) 74'
MF	13	Freddy Góndola		(substituted on) 84'
MF	21	César Yanis		(substituted on) 90'
Manager:
(Spain) Thomas Christiansen

Man of the Match:
Cristian Martínez (Panama)

Assistant referees:
Neuza Back (Brazil)
Mary Blanco (Colombia)
Fourth official:
Raphael Claus (Brazil)
Fifth official:
Bruno Boschilia (Brazil)
Video assistant referee:
Rodolpho Toski (Brazil)
Assistant video assistant referee:
Joel Alarcón (Peru)
