= Bolivia national football team records and statistics =

The following is a list of the Bolivia national football team's competitive records and statistics.

== Player records ==
As of 21 November 2023
Players in bold are still active, at least at club level.

=== Most caps ===
Rank	Player	Caps	Goals	Career
1	Marcelo Moreno	108	31	2007–2023
2	Ronald Raldes	102	3	2001–2018
3	Luis Cristaldo	93	4	1989–2005
3	Marco Sandy	93	6	1993–2003
5	José Milton Melgar	89	6	1980–1997
6	Juan Carlos Arce	88	15	2004–2022
6	Carlos Borja	88	1	1979–1995
8	Julio César Baldivieso	85	15	1991–2005
8	Juan Manuel Peña	85	1	1991–2009
10	Miguel Rimba	80	0	1989–2000

=== Most goals ===
Rank	Player	Goals	Caps	Ratio	Career
1	Marcelo Moreno	31	108	0.29	2007–2023
2	Joaquín Botero	20	48	0.42	1999–2009
3	Víctor Agustín Ugarte	16	45	0.36	1947–1963
4	Carlos Aragonés	15	31	0.48	1977–1981
4	Erwin Sánchez	15	57	0.26	1989–2005
4	Julio César Baldivieso	15	85	0.18	1991–2005
4	Juan Carlos Arce	15	88	0.17	2004–2022
8	Máximo Alcócer	13	22	0.59	1953–1963
8	Marco Antonio Etcheverry	13	71	0.18	1989–2003
10	Miguel Aguilar	10	34	0.29	1977–1983

== Competition records ==
=== FIFA World Cup ===
Year	FIFA World Cup record							Qualification record						
Year	Round	Pld	W	D	L	GF	GA	Pos.	Pld	W	D	L	GF	GA
1930	Group stage	2	0	0	2	0	8	Qualified as invitees						
1934 to 1938	Did not enter							Declined participation						
1950	Group stage	1	0	0	1	0	8	Qualified automatically						
1954	Did not enter							Declined participation						
1958	Did not qualify							2nd	4	2	0	2	6	6
1962	Did not qualify							2nd	2	0	1	1	2	3
1966	Did not qualify							3rd	4	1	0	3	4	9
1970	Did not qualify							2nd	4	2	0	2	5	6
1974	Did not qualify							3rd	4	0	0	4	1	11
1978	Did not qualify							3rd	8	3	1	4	10	25
1982	Did not qualify							2nd	4	1	0	3	5	6
1986	Did not qualify							3rd	4	0	2	2	2	7
1990	Did not qualify							2nd	4	3	0	1	6	5
1994	Group stage	3	0	1	2	1	4	2nd	8	5	1	2	22	11
1998	Did not qualify							8th	16	4	5	7	18	21
2002	Did not qualify							7th	18	4	6	8	21	33
2006	Did not qualify							10th	18	4	2	12	20	37
2010	Did not qualify							9th	18	4	3	11	22	36
2014	Did not qualify							8th	16	2	6	8	17	30
2018	Did not qualify							9th	18	4	2	12	16	38
2022	Did not qualify							9th	18	4	3	11	23	42
2026	To be determined							In progress						
Totals	3/22	6	0	1	5	1	20	—	168	43	32	93	200	326

Draws include knockout matches decided via penalty shoot-out; correct as of 29 March 2022, after the match against Brazil.

=== Copa América ===
South American Championship / Copa América record
Year	Round	Pld	W	D	L	GF	GA
1916 to 1925	Did not participate						
1926	Round robin	4	0	0	4	2	24
1927	Fourth place	3	0	0	3	3	19
1929 to 1942	Did not participate						
1945	Round robin	6	0	2	4	3	16
1946	Round robin	5	0	0	5	4	23
1947	Round robin	7	0	2	5	6	21
1949	Fourth place	7	4	0	3	13	24
1953	Round robin	6	1	1	4	6	15
1955 to 1957	Did not participate						
1959 (first)	Round robin	6	0	1	5	4	23
1959 (second)	Withdrew						
1963	Champions	6	5	1	0	19	13
1967	Round robin	5	0	1	4	0	9
1975	Group stage	4	1	0	3	3	9
1979	Group stage	4	2	0	2	4	7
1983	Group stage	4	0	2	2	4	6
1987	Group stage	2	0	1	1	0	2
1989	Group stage	4	0	2	2	0	8
1991	Group stage	4	0	2	2	2	7
1993	Group stage	3	0	2	1	1	2
1995	Quarter-finals	4	1	1	2	5	6
1997	Runners-up	6	5	0	1	10	5
1999	Group stage	3	0	2	1	1	2
2001	Group stage	3	0	0	3	0	7
2004	Group stage	3	0	2	1	3	4
2007	Group stage	3	0	2	1	4	5
2011	Group stage	3	0	1	2	1	5
2015	Quarter-finals	4	1	1	2	4	10
2016	Group stage	3	0	0	3	2	7
2019	Group stage	3	0	0	3	2	9
2021	Group stage	4	0	0	4	2	10
2024	Group stage	3	0	0	3	1	10
Total	29/48	122	20	26	76	109	308

Draws include knockout matches decided via penalty shoot-out; correct as of 28 June 2021, after the match against Argentina.

=== FIFA Confederations Cup ===
FIFA Confederations Cup record
Year	Round	Pld	W	D	L	GF	GA
1992 to 1997	Did not qualify						
1999	Group stage	3	0	2	1	2	3
2001 to 2017	Did not qualify						
Total	1/10	3	0	2	1	2	3

=== Pan American Games ===
Pan American Games record
Year	Round	Pld	W	D	L	GF	GA
1951 to 1971	Did not participate						
1975	Second round	5	2	0	3	4	14
1979 to 1995	Did not participate						
Since 1999	See Bolivia national under-23 football team						
Total	1/12	5	2	0	3	4	14

== Head-to-head record ==
The list shown below shows the national football team of Bolivia's all-time international record against opposing nations. The stats are composed of FIFA World Cup and Copa América, matches as well as numerous international friendly tournaments and matches.

The following tables show Bolivia's all-time international record, correct as of 30 September 2026 vs. Argentina.

=== AFC ===
Team	Pld	W	D	L	GF	GA	GD	WPCT
Iran	1	0	0	1	1	2	−1	0.00
Iraq	2	0	1	1	1	2	−1	0.00
Japan	4	0	1	3	1	7	−6	0.00
Jordan	1	1	0	0	1	0	+1	100.00
Myanmar	1	1	0	0	3	0	+3	100.00
Saudi Arabia	4	2	2	0	5	3	+2	50.00
South Korea	4	0	2	2	0	3	−3	0.00
United Arab Emirates	1	0	1	0	0	0	0	0.00
Uzbekistan	1	0	0	1	0	1	−1	0.00
Total	19	4	7	8	12	18	−6	21.05

Source: Results from 1926–79, 1980–99, 2000–19 and 2020–present

=== CAF ===
Team	Pld	W	D	L	GF	GA	GD	WPCT
Algeria	1	0	0	1	2	3	−1	0.00
Cameroon	1	0	1	0	1	1	0	0.00
Egypt	1	0	1	0	2	2	0	0.00
Senegal	2	0	0	2	1	4	−3	0.00
South Africa	1	1	0	0	1	0	+1	100.00
Total	6	1	2	3	7	10	−3	16.67

Source: Results from 1926–79, 1980–99, 2000–19 and 2020–present

=== CONCACAF ===
Team	Pld	W	D	L	GF	GA	GD	WPCT
Costa Rica	3	0	1	2	1	7	−6	0.00
Cuba	1	1	0	0	1	0	+1	100.00
Curaçao	2	0	1	1	1	2	−1	0.00
El Salvador	5	2	2	1	9	6	+3	40.00
Guatemala	5	1	1	3	5	7	−2	20.00
Guyana	1	1	0	0	2	0	+2	100.00
Honduras	5	2	2	1	4	3	+1	40.00
Haiti	3	3	0	0	14	4	+10	100.00
Jamaica	3	1	1	1	6	3	+3	33.33
Mexico	14	1	2	11	5	22	−17	7.14
Nicaragua	3	2	1	0	6	4	+2	66.67
Panama	7	2	0	5	8	12	−4	28.57
Suriname	1	1	0	0	2	1	+1	100.00
Trinidad and Tobago	2	2	0	0	8	0	+8	100.00
United States	9	2	4	3	6	12	−6	22.22
Total	64	21	15	28	78	83	−5	32.81

Source: Results from 1926–79, 1980–99, 2000–19 and 2020–present

=== CONMEBOL ===
Team	Pld	W	D	L	GF	GA	GD	WPCT
Argentina	44	7	5	32	36	120	−84	15.91
Brazil	35	6	4	25	27	117	−90	17.14
Chile	51	9	9	33	53	117	−64	17.65
Colombia	33	7	10	16	31	51	−20	21.21
Ecuador	39	6	12	21	39	75	−36	15.38
Paraguay	72	16	19	37	76	142	−66	22.22
Peru	53	15	12	26	49	83	−34	28.30
Uruguay	48	8	8	32	35	118	−83	16.67
Venezuela	42	17	10	15	83	68	+15	40.48
Total	417	91	89	237	429	891	−462	21.82

Source: Results from 1926–79, 1980–99, 2000–19 and 2020–present

=== UEFA ===
Team	Pld	W	D	L	GF	GA	GD	WPCT
Andorra	1	1	0	0	1	0	+1	100.00
Bulgaria	1	0	0	1	1	3	−2	0.00
Czechoslovakia	2	1	0	1	4	6	−2	50.00
East Germany	1	1	0	0	2	1	+1	100.00
Finland	2	1	1	0	5	2	+3	50.00
France	1	0	0	1	0	2	−2	0.00
Germany	1	0	0	1	0	1	−1	0.00
Greece	2	0	1	1	1	2	−1	0.00
Hungary	2	0	0	2	2	9	−7	0.00
Iceland	1	0	0	1	0	1	−1	0.00
Poland	2	0	0	2	1	3	−2	0.00
Portugal	1	0	0	1	0	4	−4	0.00
Republic of Ireland	3	0	1	2	1	5	−4	0.00
Romania	1	0	0	1	0	3	−3	0.00
Russia (Note: Includes results as USSR.)	1	0	0	1	1	2	−1	0.00
Scotland	1	0	0	1	0	4	−4	0.00
Serbia	1	0	0	1	1	5	−4	0.00
Slovakia	3	1	0	2	2	3	−1	33.33
Spain	2	0	0	2	1	5	−4	0.00
Switzerland	1	0	1	0	0	0	0	0.00
Yugoslavia (Note: Includes results as Kingdom of Yugoslavia.)	2	0	1	1	1	5	−4	0.00
Total	32	5	5	22	24	66	−42	15.63

Source: Results from 1926–79, 1980–99, 2000–19 and 2020–present

=== Full Confederation record ===
Team	Pld	W	D	L	GF	GA	GD	WPCT
AFC	18	4	7	7	12	16	−4	22.22
CAF	6	1	2	3	7	10	−3	16.67
CONCACAF	62	21	16	25	78	80	−2	33.87
CONMEBOL	418	91	89	238	429	893	−464	21.77
UEFA	31	5	5	21	23	64	−41	16.13
Total	535	122	119	294	549	1063	−514	22.80

Source: Results from 1926–79, 1980–99, 2000–19 and 2020–present
