= 1996 U.S. Cup =

- Genre: Sporting Event
- Date: June
- Venue: Giants Stadium
- Location: East Rutherford
- Country: United States
- Participants: United States; Mexico; Bolivia; Republic of Ireland

The 1996 U.S. Cup was a United States Soccer Federation (USSF) organized international football tournament in June 1996. The USSF had hosted the annual U.S. Cup since 1992, except for the World Cup years of 1994 and 1998. The four teams in 1996 were the United States, Mexico, Bolivia, and Republic of Ireland. Staged as a six-game, round robin tournament, the team with the best win–loss record took the title. Bolivia was playing its first U.S. Cup while both Ireland and Mexico were playing their second U.S. Cup. Mexico won the competition, a result it repeated in 1997 and 1999.

== June 8: Mexico vs Bolivia ==
June 8, 1996

Mexico	1–0	Bolivia
Garcia 80'	(Report)

Cotton Bowl
Attendance: 25,187
Referee: Hall (USA)

== June 9: USA vs Ireland ==
June 8, 1996

United States	2–1	Republic of Ireland
Ramos 58'; Reyna 76'	(Report)	Connolly 57'

Foxboro Stadium
Attendance: 25,332
Referee: Prendergast (Jamaica)

United States: Brad Friedel, Mike Burns, Marcelo Balboa, Thomas Dooley, Alexi Lalas, Jeff Agoos, John Harkes, Claudio Reyna (Jovan Kirovski 77’), Tab Ramos (Roy Lassiter 77’), Cobi Jones, Eric Wynalda (Paul Caligiuri 88’)

Ireland: Shay Given, Jeff Kenna (Curtis Fleming 40’), Terry Phelan, Kenny Cunningham, Alan Kernaghan, Gary Breen, Alan McLoughlin, Gareth Farrelly (Mark Kennedy 61’), Liam O'Brien (Keith O'Neill 87’), Niall Quinn (Dave Savage 87’), David Connolly

== June 12: Mexico vs Ireland ==
Mexico and Ireland played to a 2-2 tie at the Giants Stadium in East Rutherford. Luis Garcia scored first for Mexico in the 40th minute. Four minutes later, David Connolly, just beginning his national team career, evened the score. Five minutes later, Ireland gained from a Mexico own goal off Davino. However, Ireland had two men sent off, Liam Daish and Niall Quinn, as well as their manager Mick McCarthy, and Luis Garcia converted a 70th-minute penalty to end the game at 2-2. The automatic one game suspension of McCarthy was overturned on appeal.

June 12, 1996

Mexico	2–2	Republic of Ireland
Garcia 40'; Garcia 70'	(Report)	Connolly 44'; O.G. 49'

Giants Stadium
Attendance: 21,322
Referee: Dominguez (USA)

Mexico: Oswaldo Sánchez, Claudio Suárez, Duilio Davino, Joaquín del Olmo, Germán Villa, Raúl Lara, Manuel Sol, Rafael Garcia (Cuauhtémoc Blanco 54’), Enrique Alfaro, Luis García Postigo, Francisco Palencia (José Manuel Abundis 45’)

Ireland: Packie Bonner, Curtis Fleming, Gary Breen, Liam Daish, Ian Harte, Mark Kennedy (Terry Phelan 73’), Dave Savage, Alan McLoughlin, Alan Moore, Keith O'Neill, David Connolly

== June 12: USA vs Bolivia ==
June 12, 1996

United States	0–2	Bolivia
	(Report)	Moreno 2'; Coimbra 88'

RFK Stadium
Attendance: 19,350
Referee: Bucci (Canada)

United States: Brad Friedel, Mike Burns, Jeff Agoos (Roy Lassiter 78’), Marcelo Balboa, Alexi Lalas, John Harkes, Cobi Jones, Claudio Reyna, Tab Ramos, Eric Wynalda, Jovan Kirovski (Thomas Dooley 59’)

Bolivia: Marco Antonio Barrero, Juan Manuel Peña, Óscar Sánchez, Miguel Rimba, Marco Sandy, Julio César Baldivieso, Mauricio Ramos, Cossio, Marco Etcheverry (Paniagua 46’), Jaime Moreno (Ramiro Castilloo 46’), Milton Coimbra

== June 15: Ireland vs Bolivia ==
June 15, 1996

Republic of Ireland	3–0	Bolivia
Keith O'Neill 12'; Keith O'Neill 33'; Harte 45'	(Report)

Giants Stadium
Attendance: 14,624
Referee: Baharmast (USA)

Ireland: Shay Given (Packie Bonner 85’), Curtis Fleming, Kenny Cunningham, Alan Kernaghan (Gary Breen 35’), Ian Harte, Terry Phelan, Dave Savage, Liam O'Brien (Alan McLoughlin 45’), Gareth Farrelly (Mark Kennedy 65’), Keith O'Neill, Alan Moore

Bolivia: Mauricio Soria, Juan Manuel Peña, Óscar Sánchez, Miguel Rimba, Ramiro Castillo, Julio César Baldivieso, Marco Etcheverry, Mauricio Ramos (Luis Cristaldo 41’), Cossio, Marco Sandy, Jaime Moreno (Milton Coimbra 46’)

== June 16: USA vs Mexico ==
The USA and Mexico, under former U.S. coach Bora Milutinovic tied 2-2 in the final game of the competition. The high tempo game went back and forth as the teams scored goals in both halves. The U.S. scored first with an Eric Wynalda shot in the 34th minute, but Mexico scored with a Garcia goal in the 45th minute. Cuauhtémoc Blanco scored what appeared to be the winning goal in the 89th minute, but Thomas Dooley scored a minute later. With the tie, Mexico won first in the standings and the first of its three consecutive U.S. Cup titles.

June 16, 1996

United States	2–2	Mexico
Wynalda 34'; Dooley 90'	(Report)	R. García 45'; Blanco 89'

Rose Bowl
Attendance: 92,216
Referee: unknown

United States: Brad Friedel, Mike Burns (Mike Sorber 72’), Marcelo Balboa, Alexi Lalas, Paul Caligiuri, John Harkes, Thomas Dooley, Tab Ramos, Cobi Jones, Claudio Reyna, Eric Wynalda (Brian McBride 65’)

Mexico: Jorge Campos, Claudio Suárez, Duilio Davino, Raúl Lara, Rafael Garcia, Manuel Sol, Enrique Alfaro (Cuauhtémoc Blanco 75’), Francisco Palencia (José Manuel Abundis 80), Joaquín del Olmo, Germán Villa, Luis García Postigo

== Champion ==
1996 U.S. Cup Winner:

Mexico
First title

== Scorers ==
Three Goals

- (Mexico) Luis García Postigo

Two Goals

- (Republic of Ireland) David Connolly
- (Republic of Ireland) Keith O'Neill

One Goal

- (Bolivia) Jaime Moreno
- (Bolivia) Milton Coimbra
- (United States) Tab Ramos
- (United States) Claudio Reyna
- (United States) Eric Wynalda
- (United States) Thomas Dooley
- (Republic of Ireland) Ian Harte
- (Mexico) Cuauhtémoc Blanco
- (Mexico) Rafael Garcia

== Final rankings ==
Team		Pts	GP	W	T	L	GF	GA	Dif	Perc
1	Mexico	5	3	1	2	0	5	4	+1	55.6%
2	Republic of Ireland	4	3	1	1	1	6	4	+2	44.4%
3	United States	4	3	1	1	1	4	5	-1	44.4%
4	Bolivia	3	3	1	0	2	2	4	-2	33,0%
