= Bolivia national football team results (2020–present) =

This page details the match results and statistics of the Bolivia national football team from 2020 to present.

== Key ==
Key to matches

- Att.=Match attendance
- (H)=Home ground
- (A)=Away ground
- (N)=Neutral ground

Key to record by opponent

- Pld=Games played
- W=Games won
- D=Games drawn
- L=Games lost
- GF=Goals for
- GA=Goals against

== Results ==
Bolivia's score is shown first in each case.

No.	Date	Venue	Opponents	Score	Competition	Bolivia scorers	Att.	Ref.
469	9 October 2020	Neo Química Arena, São Paulo (A)	Brazil	0–5	2022 FIFA World Cup qualification		0	
470	13 October 2020	Estadio Hernando Siles, La Paz (H)	Argentina	1–2	2022 FIFA World Cup qualification	Martins	0	
471	12 November 2020	Estadio Hernando Siles, La Paz (H)	Ecuador	2–3	2022 FIFA World Cup qualification	Arce, Martins	0	
472	17 November 2020	Estadio Defensores del Chaco, Asunción (A)	Paraguay	2–2	2022 FIFA World Cup qualification	Martins, Céspedes	0	
473	26 March 2021	Estadio El Teniente, Rancagua (A)	Chile	1–2	Friendly	Martins	0	
474	29 March 2021	Estadio Banco Guayaquil, Sangolquí (A)	Ecuador	1–2	Friendly	Ramallo	0	
475	3 June 2021	Estadio Hernando Siles, La Paz (H)	Venezuela	3–1	2022 FIFA World Cup qualification	Martins (2), Di. Bejarano	0	
476	8 June 2021	Estadio San Carlos de Apoquindo, Santiago (A)	Chile	1–1	2022 FIFA World Cup qualification	Martins	0	
477	14 June 2021	Estádio Olímpico Pedro Ludovico, Goiânia (N)	Paraguay	1–3	2021 Copa América	Saavedra	0	
478	18 June 2021	Arena Pantanal, Cuiabá (N)	Chile	0–1	2021 Copa América		0	
479	24 June 2021	Arena Pantanal, Cuiabá (N)	Uruguay	0–2	2021 Copa América		0	
480	28 June 2021	Arena Pantanal, Cuiabá (N)	Argentina	1–4	2021 Copa América	Saavedra	0	
481	2 September 2021	Estadio Hernando Siles, La Paz (H)	Colombia	1–1	2022 FIFA World Cup qualification	Saucedo	15,000	
482	5 September 2021	Estadio Campeón del Siglo, Montevideo (A)	Uruguay	2–4	2022 FIFA World Cup qualification	Martins (2)	15,000	
483	9 September 2021	Estadio Monumental, Buenos Aires (A)	Argentina	0–3	2022 FIFA World Cup qualification		17,000	
484	7 October 2021	Estadio Monumental, Guayaquil (A)	Ecuador	0–3	2022 FIFA World Cup qualification		16,000	
485	10 October 2021	Estadio Hernando Siles, La Paz (H)	Peru	1–0	2022 FIFA World Cup qualification	Vaca	20,000	
486	14 October 2021	Estadio Hernando Siles, La Paz (H)	Paraguay	4–0	2022 FIFA World Cup qualification	Ramallo, Villarroel, Ábrego, Fernández	12,000	
487	5 November 2021	Audi Field, Washington, D.C. (N)	El Salvador	1–0	Friendly	Ramallo	—	
488	11 November 2021	Estadio Nacional, Lima (A)	Peru	0–3	2022 FIFA World Cup qualification		10,000	
489	16 November 2021	Estadio Hernando Siles, La Paz (H)	Uruguay	3–0	2022 FIFA World Cup qualification	Arce (2), Martins	7,000	
490	21 January 2022	Estadio Olimpico Patria, Sucre (H)	Trinidad and Tobago	5–0	Friendly	Arce, Ramallo, Martins, Justiniano, Miranda	—	
491	27 January 2022	Estadio Agustín Tovar, Barinas (A)	Venezuela	1–4	2022 FIFA World Cup qualification	Miranda	24,000	
492	1 February 2022	Estadio Hernando Siles, La Paz (H)	Chile	2–3	2022 FIFA World Cup qualification	Enoumba, Martins	28,000	
493	24 March 2022	Estadio Metropolitano, Barranquilla (A)	Colombia	0–3	2022 FIFA World Cup qualification		25,000	
494	29 March 2022	Estadio Hernando Siles, La Paz (H)	Brazil	0–4	2022 FIFA World Cup qualification		—	
495	24 September 2022	Stade de la Source, Orléans (N)	Senegal	0–2	Friendly		—	
496	19 November 2022	Estadio de la UNSA, Arequipa (A)	Peru	0–1	Friendly	Ursino	—	
497	24 March 2023	King Abdullah Sports City, Jeddah (N)	Uzbekistan	0–1	Friendly		—	
498	28 March 2023	Prince Abdullah Al Faisal Stadium, Jeddah (A)	Saudi Arabia	2–1	Friendly	Martins, Algarañaz	—	
499	17 June 2023	Red Bull Arena, Harrison (N)	Ecuador	0–1	Friendly		—	
500	20 June 2023	Estadio Ramón Tahuichi Aguilera, Santa Cruz (H)	Chile	0–0	Friendly		—	
501	27 August 2023	Estadio Félix Capriles, Cochabamba (H)	Panama	1–2	Friendly	Ursino	—	
502	8 September 2023	Mangueirão, Belém (A)	Brazil	1–5	2026 FIFA World Cup qualification	Ábrego	43,188	
503	12 September 2023	Estadio Hernando Siles, La Paz (H)	Argentina	0–3	2026 FIFA World Cup qualification		24,000	
504	12 October 2023	Estadio Hernando Siles, La Paz (H)	Ecuador	1–2	2026 FIFA World Cup qualification	Ramallo	34,200	
505	17 October 2023	Estadio Defensores del Chaco, Asuncion (A)	Paraguay	0–1	2026 FIFA World Cup qualification		30,681	
506	16 November 2023	Estadio Hernando Siles, La Paz (H)	Peru	2–0	2026 FIFA World Cup qualification	Vaca, Vaca	28,000	
507	21 November 2023	Estadio Centenario, Montevideo (A)	Uruguay	0–3	2026 FIFA World Cup qualification		46,100	
508	22 March 2024	Stade du 5 Juillet, Algiers (A)	Algeria	2–3	2024 FIFA Series	Algarañaz, Sagredo	—	
509	25 March 2024	19 May 1956 Stadium, Annaba (N)	Andorra	1–0	2024 FIFA Series	Vaca	—	
510	31 May 2024	Soldier Field, Chicago (N)	Mexico	0–1	Friendly		52,273	
511	12 June 2024	Subaru Park, Chester (N)	Ecuador	1–3	Friendly	Terceros	—	
512	15 June 2024	Pratt & Whitney Stadium at Rentschler Field, East Hartford (A)	Colombia	0–2	Friendly		—	
513	23 June 2024	AT&T Stadium, Arlington (N)	United States	0–2	2024 Copa América		47,873	
514	27 June 2024	East Rutherford, MetLife Stadium (N)	Uruguay	0–5	2024 Copa América		48,033	
515	1 July 2024	Exploria Stadium, Orlando (N)	Panama	1–3	2024 Copa América	Miranda	16,129	
516	5 September 2024	El Alto Municipal Stadium, El Alto (H)	Venezuela	4–0	2026 FIFA World Cup qualification	R. Vaca, Algarañaz, Terceros, Monteiro	20,500	
517	10 September 2024	Estadio Nacional, Santiago (A)	Chile	2–1	2026 FIFA World Cup qualification	Algarañaz, Terceros	40,000	
518	10 October 2024	El Alto Municipal Stadium, El Alto (H)	Colombia	1–0	2026 FIFA World Cup qualification	Terceros	17,191	
519	15 October 2024	Estadio Monumental, Buenos Aires (A)	Argentina	0–6	2026 FIFA World Cup qualification		60,000	
520	14 November 2024	Estadio Monumental, Guayaquil (A)	Ecuador	0–4	2026 FIFA World Cup qualification		30,758	
521	19 November 2024	El Alto Municipal Stadium, El Alto (H)	Paraguay	2–2	2026 FIFA World Cup qualification	E. Vaca, Terceros	18,655	
522	20 March 2025	Estadio Nacional, Lima (A)	Peru	1–3	2026 FIFA World Cup qualification	Terceros	33,683	
523	25 March 2025	El Alto Municipal Stadium, El Alto (H)	Uruguay	0–0	2026 FIFA World Cup qualification		10,723	
524	6 June 2025	Estadio Monumental, Maturín (A)	Venezuela	0–2	2026 FIFA World Cup qualification		46,741	
525	10 June 2025	El Alto Municipal Stadium, El Alto (H)	Chile	2–0	2026 FIFA World Cup qualification	Terceros, Monteiro	11,467	
526	4 September 2025	Estadio Metropolitano, Barranquilla (A)	Colombia	0–3	2026 FIFA World Cup qualification		—	
527	9 September 2025	El Alto Municipal Stadium, El Alto (H)	Brazil	1–0	2026 FIFA World Cup qualification	Terceros	—	
528	10 October 2025	Recep Tayyip Erdoğan Stadium, Istanbul (N)	Jordan	1–0	Friendly	Matheus	—	
529	14 October 2025	VTB Arena, Moscow (A)	Russia	0–3	Friendly		20,533	
530	14 November 2025	Daejeon World Cup Stadium, Daejeon (A)	South Korea	0–2	Friendly		33,852	
531	18 November 2025	Japan National Stadium, Tokyo (A)	Japan	0–3	Friendly		53,508	
532	18 January 2026	Estadio IV Centenario, Tarija (H)	Panama	1–1	Friendly	Roberts (o.g.)	12,000	
533	25 January 2026	Estadio Ramón Tahuichi Aguilera, Santa Cruz de la Sierra (H)	Mexico	0–1	Friendly		24,000	
534	15 March 2026	Estadio Ramón Tahuichi Aguilera, Santa Cruz de la Sierra (H)	Trinidad and Tobago	3–0	Friendly	Haquín, Godoy, Nava	15,000	
535	26 March 2026	Estadio BBVA, Monterrey (H)	Suriname	2–1	2026 FIFA World Cup qualification play-offs	Paniagua, Terceros	33,547	
536	31 March 2026	Estadio BBVA, Monterrey (A)	Iraq	1–2	2026 FIFA World Cup qualification play-offs	Paniagua	49,286	
537	6 June 2026	Sports Illustrated Stadium, Harrison (N)	Scotland	0–4	Friendly		—	
538	10 June 2026	Rock Chalk Park, Lawrence (N)	Algeria	0–4	Friendly		—	
539	27 September 2026	Audi Field, Washington D.C. (N)	Paraguay	0–2	Friendly		—	
540	30 September 2026	Estadio Mario Alberto Kempes, Córdoba (A)	Argentina	0–4	Friendly		28,500	

Notes

1. A: Match held behind closed doors due to the COVID-19 pandemic in South America.
2. B: Matches due to be held in March 2021 were postponed due to travel and quarantine restrictions caused by the COVID-19 pandemic. These matches were instead played in September and October 2021.

== Record by opponent ==
Team	Pld	W	D	L	GF	GA	GD	WPCT
Algeria	2	0	0	2	2	7	−5	0.00
Andorra	1	1	0	0	1	0	+1	100.00
Argentina	10	4	0	6	6	22	−16	40.00
Brazil	4	1	0	3	2	14	−12	25.00
Chile	7	2	2	3	8	8	0	28.57
Colombia	5	1	1	3	2	9	−7	20.00
Ecuador	7	0	0	7	5	18	−13	0.00
El Salvador	1	1	0	0	1	0	+1	100.00
Iraq	1	0	0	1	1	2	−1	0.00
Japan	1	0	0	1	0	3	−3	0.00
Jordan	1	1	0	0	1	0	+1	100.00
Mexico	2	0	0	2	0	2	−2	0.00
Panama	3	0	1	2	3	6	−3	0.00
Paraguay	7	1	2	4	9	10	−1	14.29
Peru	5	2	0	3	4	7	−3	40.00
Russia	1	0	0	1	0	3	−3	0.00
Saudi Arabia	1	1	0	0	2	1	+1	100.00
Scotland	1	0	0	1	0	4	−4	0.00
Senegal	1	0	0	1	0	2	−2	0.00
South Korea	1	0	0	1	0	2	−2	0.00
Suriname	1	1	0	0	2	1	+1	100.00
Trinidad and Tobago	2	2	0	0	8	0	+8	100.00
United States	1	0	0	1	0	2	−2	0.00
Uruguay	6	1	1	4	5	14	−9	16.67
Uzbekistan	1	0	0	1	0	1	−1	0.00
Venezuela	4	2	0	2	8	7	+1	50.00
Total	77	21	7	49	70	145	−75	27.27

Source: Results
