= 1999 U.S. Cup =

- Genre: Sporting event
- Date: March 11–13, 1999
- Country: United States
- Participants: United States, Guatemala, Mexico, Bolivia

The 1999 Nike U.S. Cup was a four-nation invitational tournament sponsored by Nike, Inc. and organized by the United States Soccer Federation (USSF) in March 1999. The four teams included the host United States, Mexico, Bolivia and Guatemala. This year, Guatemala was making its first and only appearance in the cup, Bolivia was playing in its second cup and Mexico was appearing for the third time, having won the last two editions, in 1996 and 1997. Mexico would win again this year, for its third consecutive title. While in previous years, the U.S. cup featured four teams in a round robin tournament, with the team having the best record claiming the title, this year USSF elected to use a two-game double header format. The winners of the first two games met for the title in the first game of the second doubleheader while the losers in the first two games played each other in the second doubleheader's later game.

== March 11: first doubleheader ==
In the first game of the 1999 Nike U.S. Cup, the U.S. defeated Guatemala 3–1. Coming into the match, seven of the U.S. starters had five or less caps. This showed in the early going as Guatemala controlled the run of play. However, the U.S. slowly regained its composure and using its strength in the air, began to send high balls into the Guatemala area. Ante Razov, Ben Olsen and Brian McBride all had headers saved by Guatemala keeper Edgar Estrada in the first half. The first goal of the game came in the 22d minute when Ben Olsen sent a cross into the area from the right. Brian McBride headed the ball towards the front of the goal where Joe-Max Moore quickly blasted into the top of the goal. In the 37th minute, McBride headed in a cross from Razov to give the U.S. a comfortable 2–0 lead going into halftime. However, the Guatemalans came out looking to score and finally found the net after Eddie Lewis took down Guillermo Ortega in the penalty area. Jorge Perez took the penalty kick and put it past U.S. keeper Zach Thornton. As the score remained 2–1, Guatemalan frustrations boiled over and Erick Miranda hacked at Joe-Max Moore in the box approaching the 90th minute. Moore turned around and retaliated only to find both himself and Miranda ejected. Both would miss the second game of the cup. As the victor, the U.S. advanced to the title game against the winner of the second game of the day.

March 11, 1999
17:30

United States	3–1	Guatemala
Moore 22'; McBride 37'; Hejduk 90+4'	(Report)	Perez 51' (pen.)

Los Angeles Coliseum
Attendance: 34,154
Referee: José Robles (Mexico)

United States: Zach Thornton, Jeff Agoos, Carlos Llamosa, C.J. Brown, Eddie Lewis, Richie Williams, Joe-Max Moore, Ben Olsen (Frankie Hejduk 63’), Jovan Kirovski, Ante Razov (Chris Armas 60’), Brian McBride

Guatemala: Edgar Estrada, Julio Giron, German Ruano, Ivan Leon (Catolino Molina 51’) Edgar Valencia, Martin Machon, Jorge Perez, Guillermo Ortega, Erick Miranda, Claudio Rojas, Carlos Ruiz (Julio Rodas 46’)

In the second game of the doubleheader, Bolivia went up early when Fernando Ochoaizpur scored in the 6th minute. Bolivia held to that lead until Joel Sanchez scored twice within six minutes to give Mexico the victory and a place in the title match.

March 11, 1999
20:00

Mexico	2–1	Bolivia
Sánchez 54', 60'	(Report)	Ochoaizpur 4'

Los Angeles Coliseum
Attendance: 34,154
Referee: Tim Weyland (USA)

Mexico: Adolfo Ríos, Joel Sanchez, Claudio Suárez, Pável Pardo, (Raul Lara 67’), Salvador Carmona (Rafael Garcia 79’), Miguel Zepeda, Salvador Cabrera (Alberto Garcia Aspe 46’), Paulo Chavez (Ramon Ramirez 46’), Cuauhtémoc Blanco, Luis Hernandez (4-Germán Villa 88’), José Manuel Abundis

Bolivia: Marco Barrero, Fernando Ochoaizpur, Marco Sandy, Ivan Castillo, Oscar Sanchez, Juan Manuel Pena, Sergio Castillo, Marco Etcheverry, Luis Cristaldo, Jaime Moreno (Juan Berthy 78’), Militon Coimbra

== March 13, 1999: second doubleheader ==
The second doubleheader in the 1999 Nike U.S. Cup took place on a clear, 70 F day in San Diego, California. In the first game, the U.S. and Mexico met for the title. Owing to the United States' superior goal difference, a draw would have been sufficient for them to win the competition. In the previous six meetings between the sides, Mexico had won twice with the other four matches finishing as draws. The game turned against the U.S. in the 17th minute. José Manuel Abundis carried the ball down the left side of the field before sending a cross in towards Francisco Palencia. U.S. defender Robin Fraser closed on Palencia, but Fraser slipped and the cross ran off his body into the net for an own goal. In the melee in front of the goal, Palencia struck U.S. starting goalkeeper Tony Meola in the face, putting him out of the game. The lead held until the 51st minute when Frankie Hejduk scored his second goal of the tournament with a first time shot off a Fraser cross. However, Mexico struck back six minutes later when Joel Sanchez shot from 12 yards out. Backup U.S. keeper Zach Thornton blocked the shot, but the rebound went to Abundis who scored from two yards out. The U.S. pressed for an equalizer, but Mexico's defense held and Mexico took the game and the 1999 Nike U.S. Cup title. U.S. coach Bruce Arena recorded his first loss in his position.

March 13, 1999
12:30

United States	1–2	Mexico
Hejduk 51'	(Report)	Fraser 14' (o.g.); Abundis 57'

Qualcomm Stadium
Attendance: 50,324
Referee: René Parra (Canada)

United States: Tony Meola (Zach Thornton 17’), Jeff Agoos, Robin Fraser, Eddie Pope (Ben Olsen 68’), 3-David Regis, Eddie Lewis (Clint Mathis 83’), Chris Armas, Jovan Kirovski, Frankie Hejduk, Cobi Jones, Brian McBride

Mexico: Oscar Perez, Joel Sanchez, Pável Pardo, Salvador Carmona (Miguel Zepeda 46’), Joaquin Beltran, Rual Lara, Alberto Garcia Aspe, Rafael Garcia (Ramon Ramirez 60’), Cuauhtémoc Blanco (Luis Hernandez 46’), Francisco Palencia, (Paulo Chavez 57’), José Manuel Abundis (Ricardo Peláez 77)

In the second game of the doubleheader, Guatemala defeated Bolivia 2–1 to take third place. Guatemala scored twice in the first half on goals by Jorge Perez in the 18th minute and Edgar Valencia in the 26th minute. Juan Carlos Farah of Bolivia scored in the 49th minute but his team was unable to produce another goal and Guatemala took third place based on goal differential.

March 13, 1999
15:00

Guatemala	2–1	Bolivia
Perez 18'; Valencia 26'	(Report)	Juan Carlos Farah 49'

Qualcomm Stadium
Attendance: 50,324
Referee: Brian Hall (USA)

Guatemala: Julio Englenton, Jose Molina (Catalino Molina 46’), Nelson Caceras, Jorge Perez, Julio Rafael, Claudio Rojas (Carlos Ruiz 78’), Guillermo Ortega, German Ruano, Edgar Valencia (Erik Miranda 67), Julio Rodas, Martin Machon

Bolivia: Marco Barrero, Marco Sandy (Juan Carlos Farrah 46’), Luis Cristaldo, Sergio Castillo (Mauricio Ramos 46’), Marco Etcheverry, Milton Coimbra, Luis Liendo (Rolando Rea 86’), Juan Manuel Pena, Eduardo Jiguchi (Ricardo Rojas 46’), Juan Berthy Suárez, Ivan Castillo (Richard Virona 46’)

== Champion ==
1999 Nike U.S. Cup Winner:

Mexico
Third title

== Scorers ==
Two Goals

- (Mexico) Joel Sánchez
- (United States) Frankie Hejduk
- (Guatemala) Jorge Pérez

One Goal

- (United States) Brian McBride
- (United States) Joe-Max Moore
- (Bolivia) Juan Carlos Farah
- (Bolivia) Fernando Ochoaizpur
- (Guatemala) Edgar Valencia
- (Mexico) José Manuel Abundis

== Final rankings ==
Team		Pts	GP	W	T	L	GF	GA	Dif	Perc
1	Mexico	6	2	2	0	0	4	2	+2	100%
2	United States	3	2	1	0	1	4	3	+1	50.0%
3	Guatemala	3	2	1	0	1	3	4	-1	50.0%
4	Bolivia	0	2	0	0	2	2	4	-2	00,0%
