= Joel Sánchez (Mexican footballer) =

Mexican footballer (born 1974)

Personal information
- Full name: Joel Sánchez Ramos
- Date of birth: 17 August 1974 (age 52)
- Place of birth: Zapotiltic, Jalisco, Mexico
- Height: 1.75 m (5 ft 9 in)
- Position: Centre-back

Senior career*
Years	Team	Apps	(Gls)
1991–1999	Guadalajara	156	(16)
1999–2000	América	49	(4)
2000–2003	Guadalajara	126	(11)
2004	Veracruz	19	(0)
2004–2005	Dorados	34	(2)
2005–2006	Veracruz	52	(7)
2007–2011	Querétaro	17	(1)
2007–2010	→ Estudiantes Tecos (loan)	73	(6)
2010–2011	→ Veracruz (loan)	0	(0)
Total		526	(47)

International career
1996–1999	Mexico	32	(3)

Managerial career
- 2012: Puebla (assistant)
- 2013: Instituto Once México
- 2014: Dorados de Sinaloa (assistant)
- 2014: Coras de Nayarit
- 2015: Zacatepec
- 2015–2016: Mineros de Zacatecas
- 2016–2017: Leones Negros UdeG
- 2018: Venados
- 2020: Los Cabos
Medal record
Representing Mexico
Third place	Copa América	1997
Third place	Copa América	1999
- * Club domestic league appearances and goals

Joel Sánchez Ramos (born 17 August 1974) is a Mexican former professional footballer who played as a defender for Veracruz. He is nicknamed "El Tiburón" Sánchez. He was on the Mexico squad that won the 1999 FIFA Confederations Cup.

A strong central defender, Sanchez made his debut with Guadalajara during the 1991–92 season. He is best known for his time at Chivas, where he won 1997 Verano championship. At Guadalajara, he formed a powerful defensive core alongside Claudio Suárez, with whom he played at both club and international level. After spending a year at rival Club América, he returned to Chivas in 2000. In later years, he played for Veracruz, Dorados, Querétaro, and Tecos.

He was a member of the Primera División at the 1998 FIFA World Cup, playing in the first-round games against Belgium and the Netherlands. In addition, Sanchez represented Mexico at the Copa América tournaments (1997) and (1999), helping the team to third-place finishes on both occasions.

== Career statistics ==
=== International ===
Appearances and goals by national team and year
National team	Year	Apps	Goals
Mexico	1996	2	0
Mexico	1997	9	0
Mexico	1998	10	1
Mexico	1999	11	2
Total		32	3

Scores and results list Mexico's goal tally first, score column indicates score after each Sánchez goal.

List of international goals scored by Joel Sánchez
No.	Date	Venue	Opponent	Score	Result	Competition
1	18 November 1998	Los Angeles Memorial Coliseum, Los Angeles, United States	Guatemala	2–2	2–2 (3–5 p)	Friendly
2	11 March 1999	Los Angeles Memorial Coliseum, Los Angeles, United States	Bolivia	1–1	2–1	1999 U.S. Cup
4	11 March 1999	Los Angeles Memorial Coliseum, Los Angeles, United States	Bolivia	2–1	2–1	1999 U.S. Cup

== Honours ==
Mexico

- FIFA Confederations Cup: 1999
