= Mauro Blanco =

Bolivian footballer (born 1965)

Personal information
- Full name: Mauro Salvador Blanco
- Date of birth: November 25, 1965 (age 60)
- Place of birth: San José de Pocitos, Bolivia
- Position: Midfielder

Senior career*
Years	Team	Apps	(Gls)
1997	The Strongest		
1998	Blooming		
2001	Oriente Petrolero		
2002	Real Potosí		

International career^{‡}
1997	Bolivia	9	(2)

Managerial career
- 2019-2020: Sport Boys Warnes
- * Club domestic league appearances and goals ‡ National team caps and goals as of June 8, 2009

Mauro Salvador Blanco (born 25 November 1965 in San José de Positos) is a retired Bolivian footballer, who played in midfield.

== International career ==
A player from The Strongest he obtained a total number of nine caps for the Bolivia national football team in 1997, scoring two goals; both in a friendly match against Jamaica on 1997-03-23 at his debut in the Estadio Jesús Bermúdez in Oruro, Bolivia. He represented his country in 3 FIFA World Cup qualification matches.

== Honours ==
=== Club ===
- Blooming
  - Liga de Fútbol Profesional Boliviano: 1998
