= Arturo García (Bolivian footballer) =

Bolivian footballer (born 1965)

Personal information
- Full name: Arturo García Yale
- Date of birth: 14 May 1965 (age 61)
- Place of birth: Santa Cruz de la Sierra, Bolivia
- Height: 1.80 m (5 ft 11 in)
- Position: Striker

Senior career*
Years	Team	Apps	(Gls)
1983–1990	Oriente Petrolero	204	(69)
1991	Orcobol FC	25	(9)
1992	Wilstermann	28	(21)
1993–1994	The Strongest	25	(15)
1995	San José	7	(1)
1996	Wilstermann	17	(8)
1996	Blooming		
1997	Real Santa Cruz	6	(0)
1998	Al-Shoalah		
1999	Destroyers	0	(0)

International career
1987	Bolivia Olympic	2	(0)
1989	Bolivia	8	(3)
- * Club domestic league appearances and goals

Arturo García Yale (born 14 May 1965), also known as Torito in Bolivia, is a former football striker who was capped 8 times and scored 3 international goals for Bolivia in 1989. He is also the president of Asociación de Entrenadores de Fútbol en Santa Cruz (Football Coaches Association of Santa Cruz).

== Personal life ==
García is married to Karina Vargas and together they have three children, María Raquel, Paula and Arturo Jr.

== International career ==
On 1 May 1987, he was included for the 1988 Olympic Qualifying (May), and made his debut for an International match at for Bolivia Olympic against Argentina Olympic at Estadio Olimpico Miraflores La Paz but was subbed off in the match for Juan Manuel Pena. On May 3, of the same year he played for Bolivia Olympic against 1988 Olympic runners-up Brazil Olympic also at home at Estadio Olimpico Miraflores in which Bolivia lost 2–1 with an own goal from Geraldão.

He made his debut for the senior team of Bolivia on 25 May against Paraguay in which he scored two goals, one in the 38th minute and one in the 50th minute that helped his side win 3–2. He was substituted later in the match for Rolly Paniagua.

In June 1989, he was included in the 1989 Copa América for Bolivia. He made his Copa América debut for Bolivia on 4 July in Goiânia against Uruguay playing the whole match. Two days later he returned against Ecuador but was substituted for Erwin Sánchez.

== Honours ==
Oriente Petrolero

- Bolivian League:

1990

The Strongest

- Bolivian League:

1993
