= Fernando Ochoaizpur =

Argentine-born Bolivian footballer (born 1971)

Personal information
- Full name: Fernando Néstor Ochoaizpur Iturain
- Date of birth: March 18, 1971 (age 55)
- Place of birth: Junín, Argentina
- Height: 1.79 m (5 ft 10 1/2 in)
- Position: Defender

Senior career*
Years	Team	Apps	(Gls)
1990–1993	Estudiantes	10	(0)
1993–1995	San José		
1995	Oriente Petrolero		
1996	Bolívar		
1997	Universitario		
1998	Bolívar		
1998	San Luis		
1999–2002	UNAM Pumas	54	(3)
2003	Delfín		
2003	Técnico Universitario		
2004	San Martín	3	(0)
2005	Sarmiento	6	(1)
2006–2007	Independiente Chivilcoy		

International career^{‡}
1996–1999	Bolivia	15	(3)

Managerial career
- 2018–2019: Real Potosí
- 2021–: Sant Julià
- * Club domestic league appearances and goals ‡ National team caps and goals as of June 8, 2009

Fernando Néstor Ochoaizpur Iturain (born 18 March 1971 in Buenos Aires) is a Bolivian retired footballer, who played as a defender during his career. He is currently the manager of Andorran club Sant Julià.

== Club career ==
Born in Argentina, Ochoaizpur played in several countries: Argentina, Bolivia, Peru, Mexico, and Ecuador.

== International career ==
He was a regular choice for the Bolivia national football team from 1996 to 1999 and represented his country in 8 FIFA World Cup qualification matches.

== Career statistics ==
=== International ===
Appearances and goals by national team and year
National team	Year	Apps	Goals
Bolivia	1996	2	0
Bolivia	1997	6	1
Bolivia	1999	7	2
Total		15	3

Scores and results list Bolivia's goal tally first, score column indicates score after each Ochoaizpur goal.

List of international goals scored by Fernando Ochoaizpur
No.	Date	Venue	Opponent	Score	Result	Competition	Ref.
1	2 April 1997	Estadio Hernando Siles, La Paz, Bolivia	Argentina	2–1	2–1	1998 FIFA World Cup qualification	
2	5 March 1999	Estadio Nacional Mateo Flores, Guatemala City, Guatemala	Guatemala	1–0	3–0	Friendly	
3	11 March 1999	Los Angeles Memorial Coliseum, Los Angeles, United States	Mexico	1–0	1–2	Friendly	
