= Jesús Sagredo =

Bolivian footballer (born 1994)

Personal information
- Full name: Jesús Manuel Sagredo Chávez
- Date of birth: 10 March 1994 (age 32)
- Place of birth: Santa Cruz de la Sierra, Bolivia
- Height: 1.80 m (5 ft 11 in)
- Positions: Right back; centre back

Team information
- Current team: Bolívar
- Number: 2

Senior career*
Years	Team	Apps	(Gls)
2014–2020	Blooming	63	(1)
2021	The Strongest	21	(0)
2022	Blooming	35	(2)
2023–	Bolívar	72	(2)

International career^{‡}
2020–	Bolivia	11	(0)
- * Club domestic league appearances and goals as of 20:22, 30 December 2025 (UTC) ‡ National team caps and goals as of 23:33, 23 June 2024 (UTC)

Jesús Manuel Sagredo Chávez (born 10 March 1994) is a Bolivian professional footballer who plays as a right-back for Bolivian Primera División club Bolívar.

Having been with Club Blooming since making his professional debut in 20–7, in January 2021 he joined The Strongest on loan where his brother José Sagredo also already plays.

He made his full debut for Bolivia on the 10 October 2020, against Brazil, he was playing at right back and his brother Jose was at left back.

== Career statistics ==
=== International ===
As of match played 23 June 2024

Appearances and goals by national team and year
National team	Year	Apps	Goals
Bolivia	2020	1	0
Bolivia	2021	4	0
Bolivia	2022	1	0
Bolivia	2023	2	0
Bolivia	2024	3	0
Total		11	0
