= Johnny Villarroel =

Bolivian footballer (born 1955)

Personal information
- Full name: Johnny Villarroel Delgadillo
- Date of birth: 5 April 1955 (age 71)
- Place of birth: Cochabamba, Bolivia

International career
Years	Team	Apps	(Gls)
1981–1983	Bolivia	8	(0)

Johnny Villarroel Delgadillo (born 5 April 1955) is a Bolivian footballer. He played in eight matches for the Bolivia national football team from 1981 to 1983. He was also part of Bolivia's squad for the 1983 Copa América tournament.
