= Cossío =

Cossío is a surname. Notable people with the surname include:

- Alicia Yánez Cossío (born 1928), Ecuadorian poet, novelist and journalist
- José Ramón Cossío (born 1960), Mexican jurist
- Karla Cossío (born 1985), Cuban-born Mexican actress
- Manuel Bartolomé Cossío (1857–1935), Spanish art historian and Krausist teacher
