= Marcelo Suárez (footballer, born 2001) =

Bolivian association football player (born 2001)

Personal information
- Full name: Marcelo Sebastián Suárez Justiniano
- Date of birth: 20 December 2001 (age 24)
- Place of birth: Santa Cruz de la Sierra, Bolivia
- Height: 1.78 m (5 ft 10 in)
- Position: Defender

Team information
- Current team: Cape Town City
- Number: 5

Senior career*
Years	Team	Apps	(Gls)
2019–2023	Oriente Petrolero	51	(0)
2023	Jorge Wilstermann	13	(0)
2023–2026	Always Ready	69	(3)
2026-	Cape Town City	0	(0)

International career^{‡}
2023–	Bolivia	15	(0)
- * Club domestic league appearances and goals as of 23:28 (UTC) 27 May 2026 ‡ National team caps and goals as of 19 November 2024

Marcelo Sebastián Suárez Justiniano (born 20 December 2001) is a Bolivian professional footballer who plays as a defender for National First Division club Cape Town City and the Bolivia national team.

== Club career ==
From Santa Cruz, Bolivia, Suárez began his career in Oriente Petrolero in 2019, where he established himself in the first team. Prior to the 2023 season, Suárez signed for Club Jorge Wilstermann.

Before the 2023 season had ended, he was signed by Club Always Ready on a three-year contract, although there was a legal dispute over his registration. In October 2023, Suarez was training away from the first team squad reportedly due to an internal disciplinary issue. Despite links with other sides, Suarez remained at the club for the start of the 2024 season.

== International career ==
He made his debut for the Bolivia national football team on March 28, 2023, against Saudi Arabia. He remained in the Bolivia squad for their March 2024 friendly matches.

== Career statistics ==
=== International ===
As of matches played 19 November 2024

Appearances and goals by national team and year
National team	Year	Apps	Goals
Bolivia	2023	5	0
Bolivia	2024	10	0
Total		15	0
