= Berthy Suárez =

Bolivian footballer (born 1969)

Personal information
- Full name: Juan Berthy "Chicho" Suárez
- Date of birth: June 24, 1969 (age 57)
- Place of birth: Santa Cruz de la Sierra, Bolivia
- Height: 1.78 m (5 ft 10 in)
- Position: Striker

Youth career
- 1983–1990: Tahuichi Academy

Senior career*
Years	Team	Apps	(Gls)
1990–1994	Blooming	153	(51)
1995	Guabirá	36	(29)
1996	D.C. United	2	(0)
1996–1998 / 2000	The Strongest	124	(50)
1999	Oriente Petrolero	21	(5)
Total		336	(135)

International career
1991–1999	Bolivia	28	(8)
- * Club domestic league appearances and goals as of May 14, 2008

Juan Berthy "Chicho" Suárez (born June 24, 1969) is a Bolivian former football striker.

His former clubs are Blooming, Guabirá, MLS team D.C. United, The Strongest and Oriente Petrolero. He finished his career with a second spell in The Strongest.

He also played for the Bolivia national team between 1991 and 1999, scoring 8 goals in 28 games.

== Honours ==
Season	Club	Title
1995	Guabirá	Liga de Fútbol Profesional Boliviano top scorer: 29 goals
