= William Ramallo =

Bolivian footballer (born 1963)

Wílliam Ramallo
Personal information
- Full name: Wílliam Luis Ramallo Fernández
- Date of birth: 4 July 1963 (age 63)
- Place of birth: Cochabamba, Bolivia
- Height: 1.76 m (5 ft 9 in)
- Position: Striker

Senior career*
Years	Team	Apps	(Gls)
1982–1985	Petrolero Cochabamba		
1986	Bolívar		
1987	Jorge Wilstermann		
1988	Bolívar		
1989–1993	Destroyers		
1994–1995	Oriente Petrolero		
1996–1997	Jorge Wilstermann		

International career
1989–1997	Bolivia	36	(11)

Managerial career
- 2016: Nacional Potosí
- 2019: San José
- * Club domestic league appearances and goals

Wílliam Luis Ramallo Fernández (born 4 July 1963) is a Bolivian retired football striker who was nicknamed El Pescador del Área, or El Fantasma.

He is currently the assistant coach for the Bolivia national team.

== Club career ==
Ramallo was born in Cochabamba. He played for Oriente Petrolero at the time of his international appearances.

== International career ==
Ramallo was capped 36 times and scored 11 international goals for Bolivia between 1989 and 1997. He played all three matches at the 1994 FIFA World Cup and he was also the starting forward in every group game. He represented his country in 15 FIFA World Cup qualification matches.

== Personal life ==
Ramallo has a footballer son, Rodrigo, who also played for the national team.

== Career statistics ==
Wílliam Luis Ramallo: International Goals
No.	Date	Venue	Opponent	Score	Result	Competition
1.	20 August 1989	La Paz, Bolivia	Peru	2–1	Win	1990 FIFA World Cup qualification
2.	10 September 1989	Lima, Peru	Peru	1–2	Win	1990 FIFA World Cup qualification
3.	27 May 1993	Cochabamba, Bolivia	Paraguay	2–1	Win	Friendly match
4.	18 July 1993	Puerto Ordaz, Venezuela	Venezuela	1–7	Win	1994 FIFA World Cup qualification
7.	15 August 1993	La Paz, Bolivia	Ecuador	1–0	Win	1994 FIFA World Cup qualification
8.	22 August 1993	La Paz, Bolivia	Venezuela	7–0	Win	1994 FIFA World Cup qualification
9.	12 September 1993	Montevideo, Uruguay	Uruguay	2–1	Loss	1994 FIFA World Cup qualification
10.	19 September 1993	Guayaquil, Ecuador	Ecuador	1–1	Draw	1994 FIFA World Cup qualification
11.	21 September 1994	Santiago, Chile	Chile	1–2	Win	Friendly match
