= Erick Miranda =

Guatemalan footballer (born 1971)

Personal information
- Full name: Erick Roberto Miranda Chonay
- Date of birth: 17 December 1971 (age 54)
- Place of birth: Escuintla, Guatemala
- Height: 1.76 m (5 ft 9 in)
- Position: Defender

Senior career*
| Years | Team | Apps | (Gls) |
| 1994–1995 | Amatitlán | | |
| 1996–2004 | Comunicaciones | 107 | (6) |
| 2004–2005 | Heredia | 47 | (3) |
| 2006 | Comunicaciones | 8 | (0) |
| 2007 | Mixco | | |
| 2007–2008 | Sanarate | | |

International career
| 1991–2001 | Guatemala | 69 | (2) |
- * Club domestic league appearances and goals

Erick Roberto Miranda Chonay (born 17 December 1971) is a Guatemalan former professional footballer who played as a defender. He spent most of his career for CSD Comunicaciones of the Guatemala n premier division and was a member of the Guatemala national team for ten years making 69 appearances.

== Club career ==
Miranda spent the majority of his career playing at local giants CSD Comunicaciones where he was club captain. He also had a spell at Deportivo Heredia in the 2004–05 season but returned to the Cremas in January 2006 for a short, second, spell before moving to second division side Deportivo Mixco. In September 2007 he joined fellow second division team Sanarate and in March 2009 Deportivo San Pedro were looking to acquiring his services.

== International career ==
A national team stalwart for over 10 years, Miranda made his debut for Guatemala in a May 1991 UNCAF Nations Cup match against Honduras and has earned a total of 69 caps, scoring 2 goals. He has represented his country in 19 FIFA World Cup qualification matches and played at 5 UNCAF Nations Cups as well as at 4 CONCACAF Gold Cups.

His final international was a May 2001 UNCAF Nations Cup match against Costa Rica.

== Post-playing career ==
In 2010 Miranda is Football Instructor at the Ministry of Sport and Recreation.

== Career statistics ==
Scores and results list Guatemala's goal tally first.

| # | Date | Venue | Opponent | Score | Result | Competition |
|---|---|---|---|---|---|---|
| 1 | 13 April 1997 | Robert F. Kennedy Memorial Stadium, Washington, D.C., United States | El Salvador | 1-1 | 1-1 | Friendly match |
| 2 | 17 February 2000 | Los Angeles Memorial Coliseum, Los Angeles, United States | Mexico | 1-1 | 1-1 | 2000 CONCACAF Gold Cup |
