= Silvio Rojas (Bolivian footballer) =

Bolivian footballer (born 1959)

Personal information
- Date of birth: 3 November 1959 (age 66)
- Place of birth: Porongo, Bolivia

International career
Years	Team	Apps	(Gls)
1979–1987	Bolivia	24	(4)

Silvio Rojas (born 3 November 1959) is a Bolivian footballer. He played in 24 matches for the Bolivia national football team from 1979 to 1987. He was also part of Bolivia's squad for the 1983 Copa América tournament.
