= Erwin Romero =

Bolivian footballer (born 1957)

Personal information
- Full name: Erwin Romero Escudero
- Date of birth: 27 July 1957 (age 69)
- Place of birth: Camiri, Bolivia
- Position: Midfielder

Youth career
- 1973–1976: Destroyers

Senior career*
Years	Team	Apps	(Gls)
1977–1979	Oriente Petrolero	75	(18)
1980	Quilmes	37	(6)
1981–1984	Bolívar	124	(75)
1985–1986	Real Santa Cruz	58	(15)
1986	Bucaramanga	8	(1)
1987–1988	Oriente Petrolero	41	(13)
1989–1990	Blooming	18	(5)
1991	Orcobol	14	(3)
1992	Wilstermann	18	(5)
Total		393	(141)

International career
1977–1989	Bolivia	48	(4)
- * Club domestic league appearances and goals

Erwin Romero Escudero (born 27 July 1957) is a former Bolivian football player, who participated in 49 games for the Bolivia national team between 1977 and 1989

Nicknamed Chichi, Romero was a gifted midfield playmaker noted for his vision and ball control. Some of the clubs he played for include Oriente Petrolero, Quilmes, Blooming and Bolívar. Romero played for Bolivia in four World Cup qualifying campaigns- 1978, 1982, 1986 and 1990 as well as the 1979 and 1983 Copa América tournaments.

He is one of the national league's all-time top 10 scorers with 134 goals in 348 appearances between 1977 and 1992.

== International goals ==
#	Date	Venue	Opponent	Score	Result	Competition
1.	25 January 1981	Estadio Hernando Siles, La Paz, Bolivia	Czechoslovakia	2-0	2–1	Friendly
2.	21 August 1983	Estadio Hernando Siles, La Paz, Bolivia	Peru	1-0	1–1	1983 Copa América
-	3 February 1985	Estadio Hernando Siles, La Paz, Bolivia	East Germany	2-0	2-1	Unofficial match
3.	21 April 1985	Estadio Ramón Aguilera, Santa Cruz, Bolivia	Venezuela	3-1	4–1	Friendly
4.	21 April 1985	Estadio Ramón Aguilera, Santa Cruz, Bolivia	Venezuela	4-1	4–1	Friendly
