= Bruno Miranda =

Bolivian footballer (born 1998)

Personal information
- Full name: Bruno Miranda Villagomez
- Date of birth: 10 February 1998 (age 28)
- Place of birth: Santa Cruz de la Sierra, Bolivia
- Height: 1.80 m (5 ft 11 in)
- Position: Striker

Team information
- Current team: Bolívar

Youth career
- 2014–2015: Callejas
- 2015–2017: Universidad de Chile

Senior career*
Years	Team	Apps	(Gls)
2016–2018	Universidad de Chile	3	(0)
2017–2018	→ D.C. United (loan)	12	(0)
2018	→ Richmond Kickers (loan)	1	(0)
2019	Wilstermann	19	(2)
2020	Royal Pari	18	(12)
2021–2022	Bolívar	51	(19)
2022	→ Guarani (loan)	4	(0)
2023	Guabirá	12	(2)
2023	Royal Pari	9	(4)
2024	The Strongest	4	(1)
2025	Mushuc Runa	14	(4)
2025–2026	Aucas	31	(14)
2026–	Bolívar	0	(0)

International career^{‡}
2013	Bolivia U15	4	(2)
2015	Bolivia U17	4	(2)
2017	Bolivia U20	4	(1)
2016–	Bolivia	20	(3)
- * Club domestic league appearances and goals as of 27 September 2025 ‡ National team caps and goals as of 23:21, 10 October 2024 (UTC)

Bruno Miranda Villagomez (born 10 February 1998) is a Bolivian footballer who plays as a striker for Bolívar.

== Club career ==
Miranda was born in Santa Cruz de la Sierra, Bolivia. As a teenager, he played his club football in Chile with the Universidad de Chile team.

Miranda was loaned to D.C. United in August 2017. He made his first MLS appearance on 13 August 2017, being subbed on in a game against Real Salt Lake. His contract option was not exercised by D.C. United after the 2018 season.

Soon after his loan deal with D.C. ended, he joined Wilstermann.

On 1 January 2020, Miranda joined Royal Pari.

== International career ==
Miranda has represented Bolivia at various youth levels, including under-15, under-17, and under-20. He made his debut for the Bolivia senior men's team in 2016.

== Career statistics ==
=== International ===
As of match played 10 October 2024

Appearances and goals by national team and year
National team	Year	Apps	Goals
Bolivia	2016	1	0
Bolivia	2017	2	0
Bolivia	2018	3	0
Bolivia	2020	2	0
Bolivia	2021	3	0
Bolivia	2022	4	2
Bolivia	2023	1	0
Bolivia	2024	4	1
Total		20	3

Scores and results list Bolivia's goal tally first.

No.	Date	Venue	Opponent	Score	Result	Competition
1.	21 January 2022	Estadio Olímpico Patria, Sucre, Bolivia	Trinidad and Tobago	5–0	5–0	Friendly
2.	28 January 2022	Estadio Agustín Tovar, Barinas, Venezuela	Venezuela	1–2	1–4	2022 FIFA World Cup qualification
3.	1 July 2024	Inter&Co Stadium, Orlando, United States	Panama	1–1	1–3	2024 Copa América
