= Mario Pinedo =

Bolivian footballer (born 1964)

Personal information
- Full name: Mario Daniel Pinedo Chore
- Date of birth: 9 April 1964 (age 62)
- Place of birth: Santa Cruz, Bolivia
- Height: 1.79 m (5 ft 10 1/2 in)
- Position: Midfielder

Senior career*
Years	Team	Apps	(Gls)
1985–1992	Destroyers		
1993–1994	Oriente Petrolero		
1995	Blooming	14	(0)
1996–1999	Real Santa Cruz		

International career
1985–1994	Bolivia	22	(3)
- * Club domestic league appearances and goals

Mario Daniel Pinedo Chore (born April 9, 1964, in La Paz) is a retired Bolivian footballer who played as a midfielder for the Bolivia national football team in the 1994 FIFA World Cup.

== Club career ==
He has played for Oriente Petrolero, The Strongest, Blooming and Real Santa Cruz.

== International career ==
Pinedo earned 22 caps between 1985 and 1994 and was a squad member at the 1994 FIFA World Cup for the Bolivia national team.
