= Guillermo Viscarra =

Bolivian footballer (born 1993)

Guillermo Viscarra Bruckner
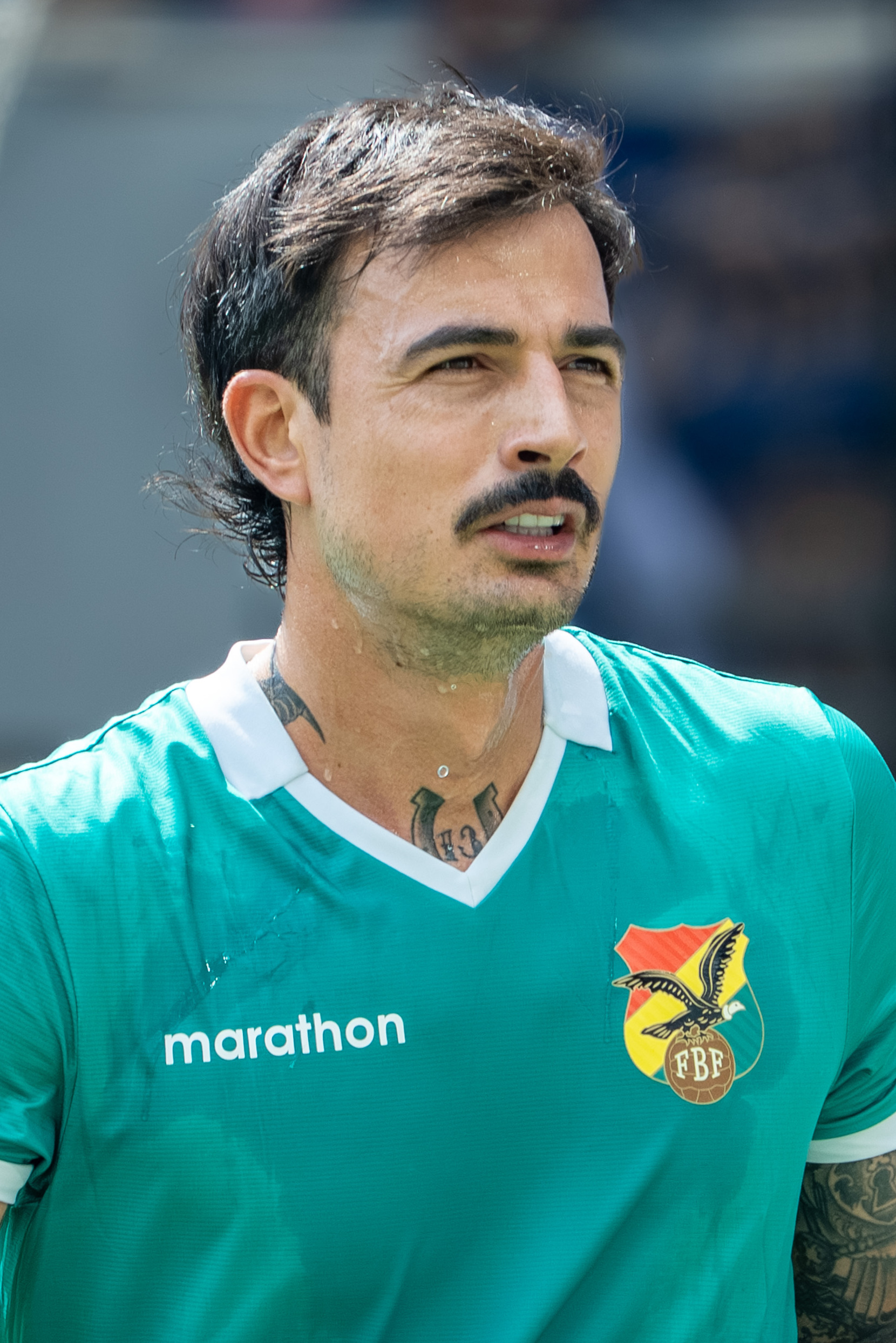
- Viscarra with Bolivia in 2026

Personal information
- Full name: Guillermo Viscarra Bruckner
- Date of birth: February 7, 1993 (age 33)
- Place of birth: Santa Cruz de la Sierra, Bolivia
- Height: 1.91 m (6 ft 3 in)
- Position: Goalkeeper

Senior career*
Years	Team	Apps	(Gls)
2013–2014	Vitória	8	(0)
2014–2015	→ Bolívar (loan)	6	(0)
2015–2017	→ Oriente Petrolero (loan)	57	(0)
2018	Hapoel Ra'anana	10	(0)
2018	Oriente Petrolero	25	(0)
2019–2020	Bolívar	15	(0)
2021–2024	The Strongest	111	(0)
2025–2026	Alianza Lima	32	(0)

International career^{‡}
2016–	Bolivia	39	(0)
- * Club domestic league appearances and goals as of 30 January 2026 ‡ National team caps and goals as of 23:20, 30 September 2026 (UTC)

Guillermo Viscarra Bruckner (born February 7, 1993) is a Bolivian professional footballer who plays as a goalkeeper for Bolivia national team.

== Career statistics ==
=== Club ===
As of 30 January 2026

Club	Season	League			Cup		Continental		Total	
Club	Season	Division	Apps	Goals	Apps	Goals	Apps	Goals	Apps	Goals
Bolívar (loan)	2014–15	FBF División Profesional	6	0	–		–		6	0
Oriente Petrolero (loan)	2015–16	FBF División Profesional	16	0	–		–		16	0
Oriente Petrolero (loan)	2016–17	FBF División Profesional	41	0	0	0	2 (Note: Appearances in Copa Sudamericana)	0	43	0
Oriente Petrolero (loan)	Total		57	0	0	0	2	0	59	0
Hapoel Ra'anana	2017–18	Israeli Premier League	10	0	3	0	–		13	0
Oriente Petrolero	2018	FBF División Profesional	25	0	–		–		25	0
Bolívar	2019	FBF División Profesional	3	0	–		1 (Note: Appearances in Copa Libertadores)	0	4	0
Bolívar	2020	FBF División Profesional	12	0	–		2	0	14	0
Bolívar	Total		15	0	–		3	0	18	0
The Strongest	2021	FBF División Profesional	5	0	0	0	0	0	5	0
The Strongest	2022	FBF División Profesional	38	0	0	0	12 (Note: Ten appearances in Copa Libertadores, two appearances in Copa Sudamericana)	0	50	0
The Strongest	2023	FBF División Profesional	28	0	4	0	6	0	38	0
The Strongest	2024	FBF División Profesional	38	0	0	0	8	0	46	0
The Strongest	Total		109	0	4	0	26	0	139	0
Alianza Lima	2025	Liga 1	31	0	0	0	18 (Note: Twelve appearances in Copa Libertadores, six appearances in Copa Sudamericana)	0	49	0
Alianza Lima	2026	Liga 1	1	0	0	0	1 (Note: Appearance in Copa Libertadores)	0	2	0
Alianza Lima	Total		32	0	0	0	19	0	51	0
Career total			249	0	7	0	50	0	306	0

=== International ===
As of match played 30 September 2026

Appearances and goals by national team and year
National team	Year	Apps	Goals
Bolivia	2016	1	0
Bolivia	2018	6	0
Bolivia	2022	1	0
Bolivia	2023	9	0
Bolivia	2024	12	0
Bolivia	2025	6	0
Bolivia	2026	5	0
Total		39	0

== Honours ==
Bolívar

- Primera División: 2014-A, 2015-C, 2019-A

The Strongest

- Primera División: 2023
