= Roly Paniagua =

Bolivian footballer (born 1966)

Personal information
- Full name: Rolando Paniagua Cabrera
- Date of birth: 14 November 1966 (age 59)
- Place of birth: Santa Cruz de la Sierra, Bolivia
- Position: Forward

Team information
- Current team: Oriente Petrolero (assistant)

Youth career
- 1979–1983: Academia Tahuichi

Senior career*
Years	Team	Apps	(Gls)
1983–1989	Blooming	185	(32)
1990	Real Santa Cruz	20	(5)
1991	Orcobol	8	(0)
1992–1994	Blooming	43	(7)
1995–1996	San José	63	(32)
1997	Oriente Petrolero	27	(18)
1998	Blooming	34	(3)
1999	San José	10	(5)
2000	Real Santa Cruz	16	(3)
2000–2001	San José	0	(0)

International career
1985–1996	Bolivia	25	(3)

Managerial career
- 2018: Blooming (assistant)
- 2018: Blooming (interim)
- 2022–: Oriente Petrolero (assistant)
- 2023: Oriente Petrolero (interim)
- * Club domestic league appearances and goals

Rolando "Roly" Paniagua Cabrera (born 14 November 1966) is a Bolivian football coach and former player who played as a forward. He is the current assistant manager of Oriente Petrolero.

Paniagua played in 25 matches for the Bolivia national football team from 1985 to 1996. He was also part of Bolivia's squad for the 1987 Copa América tournament.
