= Óscar Sánchez (footballer, born 1971) =

Bolivian footballer

Personal information
- Full name: Óscar Carmelo Sánchez Zambrana
- Date of birth: July 16, 1971
- Place of birth: Cochabamba, Bolivia
- Date of death: November 23, 2007 (aged 36)
- Place of death: La Paz, Bolivia
- Height: 1.78 m (5 ft 10 in)
- Position: Defender

Youth career
- Aurora

Senior career*
Years	Team	Apps	(Gls)
1991–1996	The Strongest	163	(22)
1997–1998	Gimnasia de Jujuy	29	(6)
1998–1999	Independiente	33	(7)
2000–2001	The Strongest	55	(11)
2002–2006	Bolivar	144	(16)
2007	The Strongest	6	(0)
Total		430	(62)

International career^{‡}
1994–2006	Bolivia	78	(6)

Managerial career
- 2007: The Strongest
- * Club domestic league appearances and goals as of 13:51, 19 June 2009 (UTC) ‡ National team caps and goals as of 13:51, 19 June 2009 (UTC)

Óscar Carmelo Sánchez Zambrana (July 16, 1971 – November 23, 2007) was a Bolivian footballer who played for the Bolivia national football team in the 1994 FIFA World Cup held in the United States. Born in Cochabamba, he was capped 78 times by Bolivia and scored 6 goals, between 1994 and 2006. He was the captain of the national team several times. He made his debut for the national side on April 20, 1994, in a friendly match in Bucharest against Romania.

At club level he began his professional career with The Strongest in 1991. After five seasons with the atigrados, he was transferred to Argentine club Gimnasia y Esgrima de Jujuy, where he built a solid reputation as a temperamental and tough defender with scoring ability. His impressive displays rewarded him with a transfer to giant club Independiente in the winter of 1998. On his return to Bolivia in 2000, he would spend two more periods with The Strongest, and one with Bolívar. In 2007, he had one of his kidneys removed due to the discovery of a tumour, which proved to be malignant. After the operation he continued playing, but was forced to retire soon thereafter. He was offered the manager position of The Strongest, with which he attained an impressive undefeated streak. In October 2007, his weak health forced him to quit that position too. Sánchez died on November 23, 2007.

Bolivia	1994	3	0
Bolivia	1995	4	2
Bolivia	1996	11	0
Bolivia	1997	15	0
Bolivia	1999	7	2
Bolivia	2000	6	0
Bolivia	2001	3	0
Bolivia	2002	3	0
Bolivia	2003	6	0
Bolivia	2004	6	0
Bolivia	2005	2	0
Bolivia	2006	1	1
Total		67	5

Scores and results list Bolivia's goal tally first, score column indicates score after each Terceros goal.

Óscar Sánchez
No.	Date	Venue	Opponent	Score	Result	Competition
1	16 July 1995	Estadio Centenario, Montevideo, Uruguay, Uruguay	Uruguay	1–2	1–2	1995 Copa América
2	25 October 1995	Estadio Ramón Tahuichi Aguilera, Santa Cruz, Bolivia	Ecuador	2–0	2–2	Friendly
3; 4	23 March 1997	Estadio Jesús Bermúdez, Oruro, Bolivia	Jamaica	1–0; 4–0	6–0	Friendly
5	15 November 2006	Estadio Municipal de El Alto, El Alto, Bolivia	El Salvador	1–0	1–0	Friendly
