= Ramiro Castillo =

Bolivian footballer (1966–1997)

- Castillo playing for River Plate in 1991

Personal information
- Full name: Ramiro Castillo Salinas
- Date of birth: March 27, 1966
- Place of birth: Coripata, Bolivia
- Date of death: October 18, 1997 (aged 31)
- Place of death: La Paz, Bolivia
- Height: 1.65 m (5 ft 5 in)
- Position: Midfielder

Senior career*
Years	Team	Apps	(Gls)
1985–1986	The Strongest	108 total	(17)
1987–1988	Instituto	27	(4)
1988–1990	Argentinos Juniors	69	(8)
1990–1991	River Plate	10	(1)
1991–1992	Rosario Central	16	(3)
1993–1994	Platense	23	(1)
1995–1996	The Strongest	see above	(5)
1997	Everton		(7)
1997	Bolívar	30	(8)

International career
1989–1997	Bolivia	52	(5)
- * Club domestic league appearances and goals

Ramiro Castillo Salinas (March 27, 1966 – October 18, 1997) was a Bolivian footballer that played as a midfielder. He was capped 52 times and scored 5 international goals for Bolivia between 1989 and 1997.

== Club career ==
Nicknamed "Chocolatín" by the colour of his skin, Castillo was born in Coripata, a small town in the sub-tropical Yungas region.

His first professional team was The Strongest, the club with which he always identified. From there he went to play successfully in Argentine football, defending the colors of Instituto de Córdoba, Argentinos Juniors, River Plate, Rosario Central and Platense. He set a record for the most appearances in the Argentine league by a Bolivian player with 145 games, also scoring 10 goals in Argentina too.

Later in his career he returned to Bolivia where he played for The Strongest and Club Bolívar.

== International career ==
Castillo represented his country in 13 FIFA World Cup qualification matches. He participated at the 1994 FIFA World Cup in the United States, and he played at four Copa America: the 1989 Copa América, 1991 Copa América, 1993 Copa América, and 1997 Copa América, where he scored a goal in the semi-final against Mexico. Bolivia were runners-up after losing 1–3 in the final against Brazil.

== Personal life and death ==
Castillo missed the final game of the 1997 Copa America due to the sudden illness of his 7-year-old son José Manuel, found to be fulminating hepatitis. His son died two days later, in June 1997. Castillo never recovered from his son's death.

Castillo died in La Paz in October 1997, at the age of 31. The cause of death was suicide. He was survived by his wife María del Carmen Crespo and their children.

The Bolivian football association announced a month of mourning after his death, and the derby game between his former clubs The Strongest and Bolívar was postponed. In Argentina there was a minute's silence at the game between his former club Platense and Gimnasia de Jujuy where the players wore black armbands.
