= Juan Manuel Peña =

Bolivian footballer (born 1973)

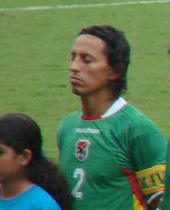
- Peña at the 2007 Copa América

Personal information
- Full name: Juan Manuel Peña Montaño
- Date of birth: 17 January 1973 (age 53)
- Place of birth: Santa Cruz, Bolivia
- Height: 1.83 m (6 ft 0 in)
- Position: Centre-back

Youth career
- Tahuichi Academy

Senior career*
Years	Team	Apps	(Gls)
1990–1993	Blooming	48	(0)
1993–1995	Santa Fe	62	(0)
1995–2004	Valladolid	249	(0)
2004–2007	Villarreal	56	(1)
2007–2009	Celta	33	(0)
2010	D.C. United	10	(0)
Total		458	(1)

International career
1991–2009	Bolivia	85	(1)
- * Club domestic league appearances and goals

Juan Manuel Peña Montaño (born 17 January 1973) is a Bolivian former professional footballer who played as a centre-back.

The vast majority of his professional career was spent in Spain, where he played a total of 14 years for three teams (mainly Valladolid), appearing in a total of 305 La Liga games.

Peña played more than 80 times with Bolivia, representing the nation at the 1994 World Cup and five Copa América tournaments.

== Club career ==
Born in Santa Cruz de la Sierra, Peña played for Club Blooming in his home country and Independiente Santa Fe in Colombia before moving to Spain in 1995. At Real Valladolid, he was a defensive stalwart for nine seasons – partnering compatriot Marco Sandy in his first – and left for Villarreal CF upon the Pucela's 2004 relegation from La Liga.

At Villarreal, Peña figured less prominently but managed to score his only league goal in a 3–0 home win over Málaga CF on 19 December 2004. After just six league appearances in 2006–07, he joined Celta de Vigo, then in the second division.

Two seasons later, Peña retired in mid-November 2009 aged 36, not wishing to pursue his career anymore after careful deliberation. However, on 25 March of the following year, he signed with D.C. United of the Major League Soccer.

== International career ==
After his debut for Bolivia in 1991 (aged 18), Peña went on to become one of its most capped players and team captain. With 85 international matches, he played a FIFA World Cup game, against Spain in 1994 (1–3 group stage loss), and also appeared in five Copa América editions.

Peña scored only once for the national team, in a friendly match with Honduras played in Washington, D.C. on 11 October 2003. In his penultimate appearance, on 1 April 2009, he witnessed a 6–1 demolition of Argentina in La Paz for the 2010 World Cup qualifiers.

== Career statistics ==
#	Date	Venue	Opponent	Score	Result	Competition
1	11 October 2003	Robert F. Kennedy Memorial Stadium, Washington, D.C., United States	Honduras	1–0	1–0	Friendly

== Honours ==
Villarreal

- UEFA Intertoto Cup: 2004
