= Milton Coimbra =

Bolivian football striker (born 1975)

Personal information
- Full name: Milton "Buffalo" Coimbra Sulzer
- Date of birth: 4 May 1975 (age 51)
- Place of birth: Santa Cruz de la Sierra, Bolivia
- Height: 1.84 m (6 ft 0 in)
- Position: Striker

Senior career*
Years	Team	Apps	(Gls)
1995–1996	Oriente Petrolero	27	(13)
1996–1997	→ Lanús (loan)	14	(0)
1997–2002	Oriente Petrolero	196	(109)
2002–2003	Puebla	44	(10)
2004	Correcaminos UAT	10	(2)
2004	Emirates	–	(–)
2005	Ionikos	26	(5)
2006	Beijing Guoan	12	(0)
2007	O'Higgins	12	(3)
2007	Oriente Petrolero	11	(1)
2008	Guabirá	12	(6)
2009	Oriente Petrolero	9	(0)
Total		373	(149)

International career
1996–2005	Bolivia	43	(7)
- * Club domestic league appearances and goals

Milton Coimbra Sulzer (born May 4, 1975, in Santa Cruz de la Sierra) is a Bolivian retired football striker. He was a journeyman footballer playing for nine clubs in seven countries.

== Club career ==
Nicknamed "Buffalo", his career began with Oriente Petrolero, where he played from 1995 to 2002 with a short interval at the Argentine club Lanús. Coimbra then went to Mexico, where he played for Puebla F.C. (2002–2003) and Correcaminos UAT (2004), before moving to Ras Al Khaima in the United Arab Emirates (2004), then to the Greek team Ionikos (2005) and later to the Chinese side Beijing Guoan (2006). During early 2007, he joined the Chilean club O'Higgins along with fellow countryman José Alfredo Castillo, but after a few games he returned to Oriente for the remainder of the year. In 2008, he was loaned to Guabirá. The team was relegated to the second division and he left after the season came to an end. During his fourth spell with Oriente during the 2009 Apertura tournament, Coimbra surprisingly announced his withdrawal from professional football at the age of 34.

== International career ==
He played for the Bolivia national team between 1996 and 2005, scoring 7 goals in 43 games. He represented his country in 17 FIFA World Cup qualification matches.
