= Rodrigo Ramallo =

Bolivian footballer (born 1990)

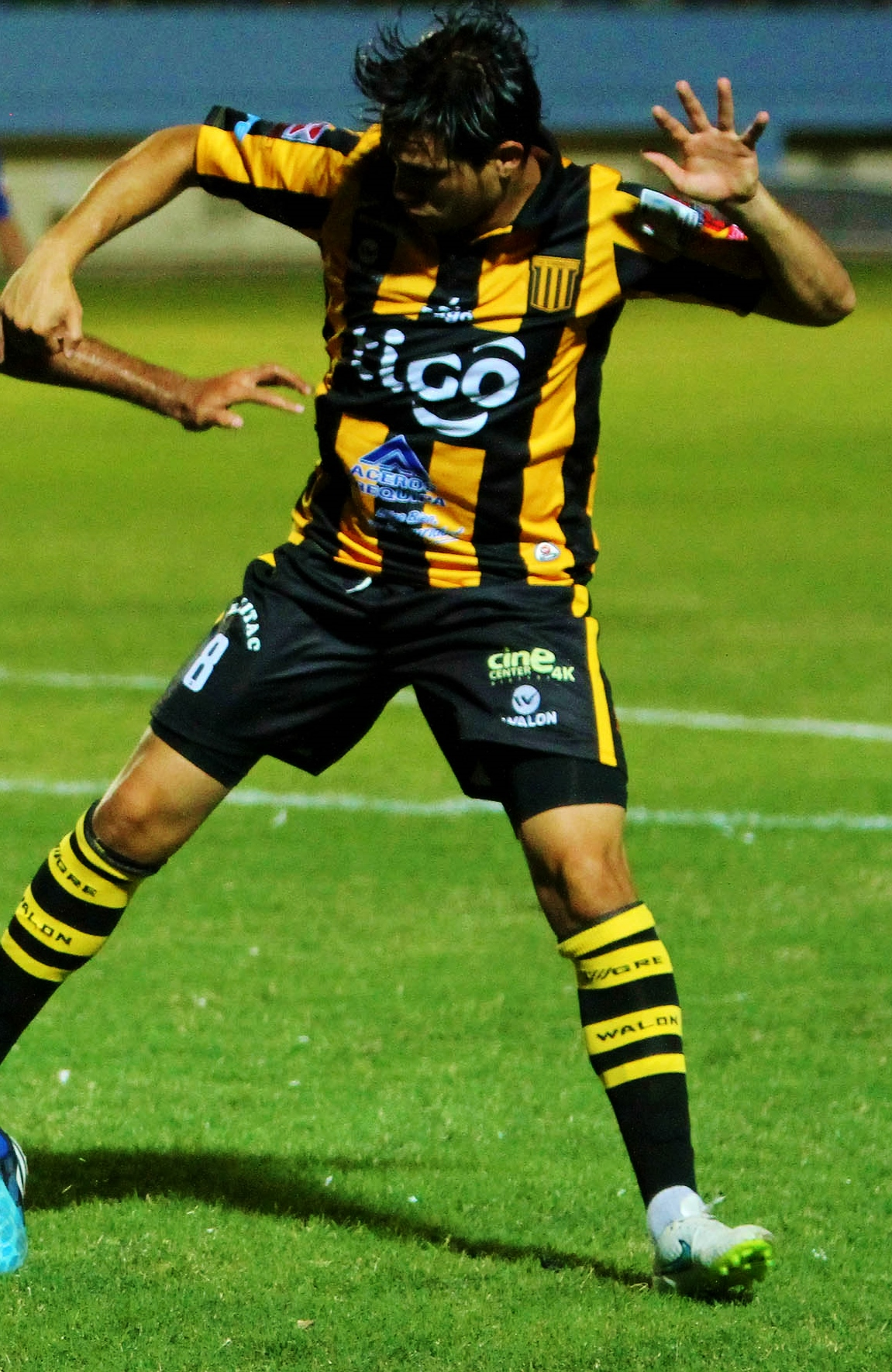
- Ramallo playing for The Strongest in 2015

Personal information
- Full name: Rodrigo Luis Ramallo Cornejo
- Date of birth: 14 October 1990 (age 36)
- Place of birth: Santa Cruz de la Sierra, Bolivia
- Height: 1.78 m (5 ft 10 in)
- Position: Striker

Team information
- Current team: Aurora
- Number: 10

Youth career
- Pelota de Trapo
- –2010: The Strongest

Senior career*
Years	Team	Apps	(Gls)
2010–2013	The Strongest	88	(21)
2013–2014	Jorge Wilstermann	40	(17)
2014–2016	The Strongest	77	(26)
2016–2017	Vitória	4	(0)
2017	The Strongest	30	(3)
2018–2019	San José	68	(25)
2020–2022	Always Ready	74	(13)
2023	Aurora	29	(3)
2024	The Strongest	23	(5)
2025–	Aurora	24	(10)

International career^{‡}
2013–	Bolivia	42	(7)
- * Club domestic league appearances and goals as of 30 December 2025 ‡ National team caps and goals as of 07:21, 24 June 2024 (UTC)

Rodrigo Luis Ramallo Cornejo (born 14 October 1990) is a Bolivian footballer who plays as a striker for Aurora and the Bolivia national team.

He is the son of the famous Bolivian former striker William Ramallo.

== International career ==
Just like his father before him, Ramallo has played for the Bolivia national team since 2013 and has, as of 29 March 2021, earned a total of seventeen caps, scoring three goals. He has represented his country in six FIFA World Cup qualification matches, as well as at the Copa América Centenario.

== Career statistics ==
=== International ===
As of matches played 23 June 2024

National team	Year	Apps	Goals
Bolivia	2013	1	0
Bolivia	2014	3	0
Bolivia	2015	3	2
Bolivia	2016	7	0
Bolivia	2019	2	0
Bolivia	2021	14	3
Bolivia	2022	4	1
Bolivia	2023	4	1
Bolivia	2024	4	0
Total		42	7

=== International goals ===
Scores and results list Bolivia's goal tally first.

No.	Date	Venue	Opponent	Score	Result	Competition
1.	12 November 2015	Estadio Hernando Siles, La Paz, Bolivia	Venezuela	1–0	4–2	2018 FIFA World Cup qualification
2.	12 November 2015	Estadio Hernando Siles, La Paz, Bolivia	Venezuela	3–1	4–2	2018 FIFA World Cup qualification
3.	29 March 2021	Estadio Monumental Banco Pichincha, Guayaquil, Ecuador	Ecuador	1–2	1–2	Friendly
4.	14 October 2021	Estadio Hernando Siles, La Paz, Bolivia	Paraguay	1–0	4–0	2022 FIFA World Cup qualification
5.	5 November 2021	Audi Field, Washington, D.C., United States	El Salvador	1–0	1–0	Friendly
6.	21 January 2022	Estadio Olímpico Patria, Sucre, Bolivia	Trinidad and Tobago	2–0	5–0	Friendly
7.	12 October 2023	Estadio Hernando Siles, La Paz, Bolivia	Ecuador	1–1	1–2	2026 FIFA World Cup qualification
