= José Sagredo =

Bolivian footballer (born 1994)

Personal information
- Full name: José Manuel Sagredo Chávez
- Date of birth: 10 March 1994 (age 32)
- Place of birth: Santa Cruz de la Sierra, Bolivia
- Height: 1.79 m (5 ft 10 in)
- Position: Left back

Team information
- Current team: Bolívar
- Number: 4

Senior career*
Years	Team	Apps	(Gls)
2011–2014	Blooming	2	(1)
2014–2016	Destroyers		
2016–2018	Blooming	79	(7)
2019–2021	The Strongest	57	(5)
2022–	Bolívar	119	(8)

International career^{‡}
2017–	Bolivia	66	(1)
- * Club domestic league appearances and goals as of 30 December 2025 ‡ National team caps and goals as of 22:04, 14 October 2025 (UTC)

José Manuel Sagredo Chávez (born 10 March 1994) is a Bolivian professional footballer who plays as a left back for Bolívar and the Bolivia national team.

== Life and career ==
Jose Sergado was born in Bolivia on 10 March 1994. He is the brother of footballer Jesús Sagredo. He started playing in 2015 for Club Blooming making 1 appearance. In his debut for Bolivia national team he went against Nicaragua in 2017 where the final results for 1-0 for World Cup qualification Comnebol. He has 40 caps for the Bolivian team.

== Statistics ==
=== Club ===
Club performance			League		Cup		League Cup		Total	
Season	Club	League	Apps	Goals	Apps	Goals	Apps	Goals	Apps	Goals
League		Apertura and Clausura			Copa Aerosur		Total			
2011/12	Blooming	Liga de Fútbol Profesional Boliviano	1	0	-	-	-	-	1	0
2012/13	Blooming	Liga de Fútbol Profesional Boliviano	-	-	-	-	-	-	-	-
2013/14	Blooming	Liga de Fútbol Profesional Boliviano	1	1	-	-	-	-	1	1
Total			2	1	-	-	-	-	2	1

=== International ===
As of match played 14 October 2025

Appearances and goals by national team and year
National team	Year	Apps	Goals
Bolivia	2017	5	0
Bolivia	2018	10	0
Bolivia	2019	2	0
Bolivia	2020	4	0
Bolivia	2021	15	0
Bolivia	2022	6	0
Bolivia	2023	7	0
Bolivia	2024	11	1
Bolivia	2025	6	0
Total		66	1

List of international goals scored by José Sagredo
No.	Date	Venue	Opponent	Score	Result	Competition
1	22 March 2024	Nelson Mandela Stadium, Algiers, Algeria	Algeria	2–1	2–3	2024 FIFA Series
