= Miguel Aguilar (Bolivian footballer) =

Bolivian footballer (born 1953)

Personal information
- Full name: Miguel Gastón Aguilar Egüez
- Date of birth: September 29, 1953 (age 73)
- Place of birth: Santa Cruz de la Sierra, Bolivia
- Height: 1.81 m (5 ft 11 1/2 in)
- Position: Attacking midfielder

Senior career*
Years	Team	Apps	(Gls)
1977–1979	Oriente Petrolero	78 total	(25)
1979	Bolívar	25	(9)
1980	The Strongest	44 total	(21)
1980	Ferro Carril Oeste	15	(1)
1981–1982	Blooming	53	(13)
1983	Oriente Petrolero	(see above)	
1984	The Strongest	(see above)	
1985–1988	Destroyers	97	(25)

International career
1977–1983	Bolivia	34	(10)
- * Club domestic league appearances and goals

Miguel Gastón Aguilar Egüez (Latin American Spanish: [miˈɣel ɣasˈton aɣiˈlaɾ eˈɣwes]; born September 29, 1953) is a retired Bolivian football midfielder. Active during the 1970s and 80's, he played at the professional level in Bolivia and Argentina.

== Playing career ==
=== Club ===
Aguilar began his career with Oriente Petrolero in 1977. Two years later he transferred to Bolívar before joining The Strongest in 1980. That same year, he also had a brief spell with the Argentine sports club Ferro Carril Oeste. In his return to Bolivia he signed with Blooming where he played from 1981 to 1982. The following season, he made his second stint with Oriente and later with The Strongest. His last professional club was Destroyers. Aguilar retired in 1988.

=== International ===
Aguilar also played for the Bolivia national team between 1977 and 1983, scoring 10 goals in 34 games.

== Managerial career ==
After retiring as a player, he took up coaching. The teams he managed include Blooming, Oriente Petrolero, and Real Santa Cruz. He was also Ramiro Blacut's assistant coach in 2004, when he was in charge of the national team.
