= Bolivia at the FIFA World Cup =

International football delegation

This is a record of Bolivia's results at the FIFA World Cup.

The FIFA World Cup is an international association football competition contested by the men's national teams of the members of Fédération Internationale de Football Association (FIFA), the sport's global governing body. The championship has been awarded every four years since the first tournament in 1930, except in 1942 and 1946, due to World War II.

The tournament consists of two parts, the qualification phase and the final phase (officially called the World Cup Finals). The qualification phase, which currently take place over the three years preceding the Finals, is used to determine which teams qualify for the Finals. The current format of the Finals involves 48 teams competing for the title, at venues within the host nation (or nations) over a period of about a month. The World Cup final is the most widely viewed sporting event in the world, with an estimated 715.1 million people watching the 2006 tournament final.

Bolivia has qualified for the World Cup on three occasions, in 1930, 1950 and 1994, with two first editions being invited to compete. They have played in six matches at the Finals, but have lost five and drawn one, with their only goal coming against Spain in 1994.

== Overall record ==
FIFA World Cup record									FIFA World Cup qualification record					
Year	Round	Position	Pld	W	D*	L	GF	GA	Pld	W	D	L	GF	GA
(Uruguay) 1930	Group stage	12th	2	0	0	2	0	8	Qualified as invitees					
(Italy) 1934	Did not enter								Declined participation					
(France) 1938	Did not enter								Declined participation					
(Brazil) 1950	Group stage	13th	1	0	0	1	0	8	Qualified automatically					
(Switzerland) 1954	Did not enter								Declined participation					
(Sweden) 1958	Did not qualify								4	2	0	2	6	6
(Chile) 1962	Did not qualify								2	0	1	1	2	3
(England) 1966	Did not qualify								4	1	0	3	4	9
(Mexico) 1970	Did not qualify								4	2	0	2	5	6
(West Germany) 1974	Did not qualify								4	0	0	4	1	11
(Argentina) 1978	Did not qualify								8	3	1	4	10	25
(Spain) 1982	Did not qualify								4	1	0	3	5	6
(Mexico) 1986	Did not qualify								4	0	2	2	2	7
(Italy) 1990	Did not qualify								4	3	0	1	6	5
(United States) 1994	Group stage	21st	3	0	1	2	1	4	8	5	1	2	22	11
(France) 1998	Did not qualify								16	4	5	7	18	21
(South Korea) (Japan) 2002	Did not qualify								18	4	6	8	21	33
(Germany) 2006	Did not qualify								18	4	2	12	20	37
(South Africa) 2010	Did not qualify								18	4	3	11	22	36
(Brazil) 2014	Did not qualify								16	2	6	8	17	30
(Russia) 2018	Did not qualify								18	4	2	12	16	38
(Qatar) 2022	Did not qualify								18	4	3	11	23	42
(Canada) (Mexico) (United States) 2026	Did not qualify								20	7	2	11	20	38
(Morocco) (Portugal) (Spain) 2030	To be determined													
(Saudi Arabia) 2034	To be determined													
Total	Group stage	3/22	6	0	1	5	1	20	168	43	32	93	200	326

*Denotes draws including knockout matches decided via penalty shoot-out.

== List of matches ==
World Cup	Round	Opponent	Score	Result	Venue	Scorers
1930	Group stage	Yugoslavia	0–4	L	Montevideo	—
1930	Group stage	Brazil	0–4	L	Montevideo	—
1950	Group stage	Uruguay	0–8	L	Belo Horizonte	—
1994	Group stage	Germany	0–1	L	Chicago	—
1994	Group stage	South Korea	0–0	D	Foxborough	—
1994	Group stage	Spain	1–3	L	Chicago	E. Sánchez

=== 1930 FIFA World Cup ===
==== Group Stage ====
Pos	Team	Pld	W	D	L	GF	GA	GD	Pts	Qualification
1	Yugoslavia	2	2	0	0	6	1	+5	4	Advance to the knockout stage
2	Brazil	2	1	0	1	5	2	+3	2	
3	Bolivia	2	0	0	2	0	8	−8	0	

Source: ESPN
17 July 1930
12:45 UYT (UTC−03:30)

Yugoslavia	4–0	Bolivia
Bek 60', 67'; Marjanović 65'; Vujadinović 85'

Estadio Parque Central, Montevideo
Attendance: 18,306
Referee: Francisco Mateucci (Uruguay)

20 July 1930
13:00 UYT (UTC−03:30)

Brazil	4–0	Bolivia
Moderato 37', 73'; Preguinho 57', 83'

Estadio Centenario, Montevideo
Attendance: 25,466
Referee: Thomas Balvay (France)

=== 1950 FIFA World Cup ===
==== Group Stage ====
Pos	Team	Pld	W	D	L	GF	GA	GD	Pts	Qualification
1	Uruguay	1	1	0	0	8	0	+8	2	Advance to final round
2	Bolivia	1	0	0	1	0	8	−8	0	

Source: FIFA
2 July 1950
15:00 BRT (UTC-3)

Uruguay	8–0	Bolivia
Míguez 14', 40', 51'; Vidal 18'; Schiaffino 23', 54'; Pérez 83'; Ghiggia 87'

Estádio Independência, Belo Horizonte
Attendance: 5,284
Referee: George Reader (England)

=== 1994 FIFA World Cup ===
==== Group Stage ====
Pos	Team	Pld	W	D	L	GF	GA	GD	Pts	Qualification
1	Germany	3	2	1	0	5	3	+2	7	Advance to knockout stage
2	Spain	3	1	2	0	6	4	+2	5	Advance to knockout stage
3	South Korea	3	0	2	1	4	5	−1	2	
4	Bolivia	3	0	1	2	1	4	−3	1	

Source: FIFA
June 17, 1994
2:00 p.m. CDT

Germany	1–0	Bolivia
Klinsmann 61'

Soldier Field, Chicago
Attendance: 63,117
Referee: Arturo Brizio Carter (Mexico)

June 23, 1994
7:30 p.m. EDT

South Korea	0–0	Bolivia

Foxboro Stadium, Foxborough
Attendance: 54,453
Referee: Leslie Mottram (Scotland)

June 27, 1994
3:00 p.m. CDT

Bolivia	1–3	Spain
E. Sánchez 67'		Guardiola 19' (pen.); Caminero 66', 70'

Soldier Field, Chicago
Attendance: 63,089
Referee: Rodrigo Badilla (Costa Rica)

== Head-to-head record ==
Opponent	Pld	W	D	L	GF	GA	GD	Win %
Brazil	1	0	0	1	0	4	−4	0.00
Germany	1	0	0	1	0	1	−1	0.00
South Korea	1	0	1	0	0	0	+0	0.00
Spain	1	0	0	1	1	3	−2	0.00
Uruguay	1	0	0	1	0	8	−8	0.00
Yugoslavia	1	0	0	1	0	4	−4	0.00
Total	6	0	1	5	1	20	−19	0.00

== Record players ==
Eight players have been fielded in all of Bolivia's group matches in 1994, making them record World Cup players for their country. In the 1930 and 1950 editions, Bolivia was drawn into groups with less than four teams, allowing those years' squads to earn fewer caps.

Rank	Player	Matches	World Cups
1	Carlos Borja	3	1994
1	Milton Melgar	3	1994
1	William Ramallo	3	1994
1	Miguel Rimba	3	1994
1	Erwin Sánchez	3	1994
1	Marco Sandy	3	1994
1	Vladimir Soria	3	1994
1	Carlos Trucco	3	1994

== Top Goalscorers ==
The only Bolivian goal at a FIFA World Cup was scored by Erwin Sánchez during their 1–3 defeat against Spain in 1994. Bolivia had not scored in their previous five World Cup matches.

Player	Goals	1930	1950	1994
Erwin Sánchez	1			1
Total	1	0	0	1

== See also ==
- Bolivia at the Copa América
- South American nations at the FIFA World Cup
