= 1994 FIFA World Cup Group C =

Football tournament group stage

Group C of the 1994 FIFA World Cup was one of six groups of four teams competing at the 1994 World Cup in the United States. The first match, which was also the opening match of the tournament was played June 17, 1994, and the final games took place simultaneously on June 27, 1994.

The group consisted of the defending champion Germany, Bolivia, Spain, and South Korea. Germany won the group and Spain finished second.

== Standings ==
| Pos | Team | Pld | W | D | L | GF | GA | GD | Pts | Qualification |
|---|---|---|---|---|---|---|---|---|---|---|
| 1 | Germany | 3 | 2 | 1 | 0 | 5 | 3 | +2 | 7 | Advance to knockout stage |
| 2 | Spain | 3 | 1 | 2 | 0 | 6 | 4 | +2 | 5 | Advance to knockout stage |
| 3 | South Korea | 3 | 0 | 2 | 1 | 4 | 5 | −1 | 2 | |
| 4 | Bolivia | 3 | 0 | 1 | 2 | 1 | 4 | −3 | 1 | |

Source: FIFA

== Matches ==
All times local (EDT/UTC–4, CDT/UTC–5, PDT/UTC–7)

=== Germany vs Bolivia ===
June 17, 1994
2:00 p.m. CDT

| Germany | 1–0 | Bolivia |
|---|---|---|
| Klinsmann 61' |

Soldier Field, Chicago
Attendance: 63,117
Referee: Arturo Brizio Carter (Mexico)

| Germany | Bolivia |

| GK | 1 | Bodo Illgner |
| CB | 14 | Thomas Berthold |
| SW | 10 | Lothar Matthäus (c) |
| CB | 4 | Jürgen Kohler | (yellow card) 6' |
| RH | 20 | Stefan Effenberg |
| CH | 16 | Matthias Sammer |
| LH | 3 | Andreas Brehme |
| CM | 7 | Andreas Möller | (yellow card) 54' |
| CM | 8 | Thomas Häßler | | (substituted off) 83' |
| FW | 9 | Karl-Heinz Riedle | | (substituted off) 60' |
| FW | 18 | Jürgen Klinsmann |
Substitutions:
| MF | 2 | Thomas Strunz | | (substituted on) 83' |
| MF | 21 | Mario Basler | | (substituted on) 60' |
Manager:
Berti Vogts

| GK | 1 | Carlos Trucco |
| DF | 3 | Marco Sandy |
| DF | 4 | Miguel Rimba |
| DF | 5 | Gustavo Quinteros | (yellow card) 89' |
| MF | 6 | Carlos Borja (c) | (yellow card) 66' |
| MF | 8 | José Milton Melgar |
| MF | 15 | Vladimir Soria | (yellow card) 37' |
| DF | 16 | Luis Cristaldo |
| FW | 18 | William Ramallo | | (substituted off) 79' |
| MF | 21 | Erwin Sánchez |
| MF | 22 | Julio César Baldivieso | (yellow card) 39' | (substituted off) 66' |
Substitutions:
| MF | 10 | Marco Etcheverry | (red card) 83' | (substituted on) 79' |
| FW | 11 | Jaime Moreno | | (substituted on) 66' |
Manager:
(Spain) Xabier Azkargorta

Assistant referees:
Eugene Brazzale (Australia)
Gordon Dunster (Australia)
Fourth official:
Rodrigo Badilla (Costa Rica)

=== Spain vs South Korea ===
This fixture was a repeat of the two teams' second match at the 1990 tournament, played on the same day (June 17), won by Spain.

June 17, 1994
6:30 p.m. CDT

| Spain | 2–2 | South Korea |
|---|---|---|
| Salinas 51'; Goikoetxea 55' | | Hong Myung-bo 85'; Seo Jung-won 90' |

Cotton Bowl, Dallas
Attendance: 56,247
Referee: Peter Mikkelsen (Denmark)

| Spain | South Korea |

| GK | 13 | Santiago Cañizares |
| RB | 2 | Albert Ferrer |
| CB | 5 | Abelardo |
| CB | 20 | Miguel Ángel Nadal (c) | (red card) 25' |
| CB | 18 | Rafael Alkorta |
| LB | 12 | Sergi |
| DM | 6 | Fernando Hierro |
| RM | 7 | Jon Andoni Goikoetxea |
| LM | 21 | Luis Enrique | (yellow card) 24' |
| AM | 8 | Julen Guerrero | | (substituted off) 47' |
| CF | 19 | Julio Salinas | | (substituted off) 63' |
Substitutions:
| MF | 15 | José Luis Caminero | (yellow card) 71' | (substituted on) 47' |
| MF | 16 | Felipe | | (substituted on) 63' |
Manager:
Javier Clemente

| GK | 1 | Choi In-young (c) |
| DF | 4 | Kim Pan-keun |
| DF | 5 | Park Jung-bae |
| MF | 6 | Lee Young-jin |
| MF | 7 | Shin Hong-gi |
| MF | 8 | Noh Jung-yoon | | (substituted off) 73' |
| FW | 9 | Kim Joo-sung | (yellow card) 37' | (substituted off) 59' |
| FW | 10 | Ko Jeong-woon |
| DF | 12 | Choi Young-il | (yellow card) 61' |
| FW | 18 | Hwang Sun-hong |
| DF | 20 | Hong Myung-bo |
Substitutions:
| FW | 11 | Seo Jung-won | | (substituted on) 59' |
| MF | 16 | Ha Seok-ju | | (substituted on) 73' |
Manager:
Kim Ho

Assistant referees:
Carl-Johan Meyer Christensen (Denmark)
Roy Pearson (England)
Fourth official:
Philip Don (England)

=== Germany vs Spain ===
June 21, 1994
3:00 p.m. CDT

| Germany | 1–1 | Spain |
|---|---|---|
| Klinsmann 48' | | Goikoetxea 14' |

Soldier Field, Chicago
Attendance: 63,113
Referee: Filippi Cavani (Uruguay)

| Germany | Spain |

| GK | 1 | Bodo Illgner |
| MF | 2 | Thomas Strunz |
| DF | 3 | Andreas Brehme |
| DF | 4 | Jürgen Kohler |
| MF | 7 | Andreas Möller | | (substituted off) 62' |
| MF | 8 | Thomas Häßler |
| SW | 10 | Lothar Matthäus (c) |
| DF | 14 | Thomas Berthold |
| MF | 16 | Matthias Sammer |
| FW | 18 | Jürgen Klinsmann |
| MF | 20 | Stefan Effenberg | (yellow card) 70' |
Substitutions:
| FW | 13 | Rudi Völler | | (substituted on) 62' |
Manager:
Berti Vogts

| GK | 1 | Andoni Zubizarreta (c) |
| RB | 2 | Albert Ferrer |
| CB | 5 | Abelardo | (yellow card) 38' |
| CB | 6 | Fernando Hierro | (yellow card) 53' |
| CB | 18 | Rafael Alkorta |
| LB | 12 | Sergi |
| DM | 9 | Pep Guardiola | | (substituted off) 77' |
| RM | 7 | Jon Andoni Goikoetxea | | (substituted off) 64' |
| LM | 21 | Luis Enrique |
| AM | 15 | José Luis Caminero |
| CF | 19 | Julio Salinas | (yellow card) 15' |
Substitutions:
| DF | 4 | Paco Camarasa | | (substituted on) 77' |
| MF | 10 | José Mari Bakero | | (substituted on) 64' |
Manager:
Javier Clemente

Assistant referees:
Venancio Zarate (Paraguay)
Ernesto Taibi (Argentina)
Fourth official:
Francisco Oscar Lamolina (Argentina)

=== South Korea vs Bolivia ===
June 23, 1994
7:30 p.m. EDT

| South Korea | 0–0 | Bolivia |

Foxboro Stadium, Foxborough
Attendance: 54,453
Referee: Leslie Mottram (Scotland)

| South Korea | Bolivia |

| GK | 1 | Choi In-young (c) |
| DF | 4 | Kim Pan-keun |
| DF | 5 | Park Jung-bae | (yellow card) 89' |
| MF | 6 | Lee Young-jin |
| MF | 7 | Shin Hong-gi | (yellow card) 62' |
| MF | 8 | Noh Jung-yoon | | (substituted off) 71' |
| FW | 9 | Kim Joo-sung |
| FW | 10 | Ko Jeong-woon | (yellow card) 38' |
| FW | 11 | Seo Jung-won | | (substituted off) 65' |
| FW | 18 | Hwang Sun-hong |
| DF | 20 | Hong Myung-bo |
Substitutions:
| DF | 12 | Choi Young-il | | (substituted on) 71' |
| MF | 16 | Ha Seok-ju | | (substituted on) 65' |
Manager:
Kim Ho

| GK | 1 | Carlos Trucco |
| DF | 3 | Marco Sandy |
| DF | 4 | Miguel Rimba | (yellow card) 22' |
| DF | 5 | Gustavo Quinteros |
| MF | 6 | Carlos Borja (c) |
| MF | 8 | José Milton Melgar |
| MF | 15 | Vladimir Soria |
| DF | 16 | Luis Cristaldo | (yellow card) 22' (yellow-red card) 82' |
| FW | 18 | William Ramallo | | (substituted off) 67' |
| MF | 21 | Erwin Sánchez |
| MF | 22 | Julio César Baldivieso | (yellow card) 32' |
Substitutions:
| FW | 9 | Álvaro Peña | | (substituted on) 67' |
Manager:
(Spain) Xabier Azkargorta

Assistant referees:
Luc Matthys (Belgium)
Mikael Erik Everstig (Sweden)
Fourth official:
Bo Karlsson (Sweden)

=== Bolivia vs Spain ===
June 27, 1994
3:00 p.m. CDT

| Bolivia | 1–3 | Spain |
|---|---|---|
| E. Sánchez 67' | | Guardiola 19' (pen.); Caminero 66', 70' |

Soldier Field, Chicago
Attendance: 63,089
Referee: Rodrigo Badilla (Costa Rica)

| Bolivia | Spain |

| GK | 1 | Carlos Trucco |
| DF | 2 | Juan Manuel Peña |
| DF | 3 | Marco Sandy |
| DF | 4 | Miguel Rimba |
| MF | 6 | Carlos Borja |
| MF | 8 | José Milton Melgar (c) |
| DF | 13 | Modesto Soruco |
| MF | 14 | Mauricio Ramos | (substituted off) 47' |
| MF | 15 | Vladimir Soria | (substituted off) 62' |
| FW | 18 | William Ramallo |
| MF | 21 | Erwin Sánchez |
Substitutions:
| FW | 11 | Jaime Moreno | (substituted on) 47' |
| MF | 20 | Ramiro Castillo | (substituted on) 62' |
Manager:
(Spain) Xabier Azkargorta

| GK | 1 | Andoni Zubizarreta (c) |
| RB | 2 | Albert Ferrer | (yellow card) 46' |
| CB | 5 | Abelardo |
| CB | 17 | Voro |
| LB | 12 | Sergi |
| DM | 9 | Pep Guardiola | | (substituted off) 68' |
| RM | 7 | Jon Andoni Goikoetxea |
| CM | 8 | Julen Guerrero |
| CM | 15 | José Luis Caminero | (yellow card) 90' |
| LM | 16 | Felipe Miñambres | | (substituted off) 45' |
| CF | 19 | Julio Salinas |
Substitutions:
| MF | 6 | Fernando Hierro | | (substituted on) 45' |
| MF | 10 | José Mari Bakero | | (substituted on) 68' |
Manager:
Javier Clemente

Assistant referees:
Raimundo Calix Garcia (Honduras)
Abdulla Al Ghattan (Bahrain)
Fourth official:
Ali Bujsaim (United Arab Emirates)

=== Germany vs South Korea ===
June 27, 1994
3:00 p.m. CDT

| Germany | 3–2 | South Korea |
|---|---|---|
| Klinsmann 12', 37'; Riedle 20' | | Hwang Sun-hong 52'; Hong Myung-bo 63' |

Cotton Bowl, Dallas
Attendance: 63,998
Referee: Joël Quiniou (France)

| Germany | South Korea |

| GK | 1 | Bodo Illgner |
| DF | 3 | Andreas Brehme | (yellow card) 24' |
| DF | 4 | Jürgen Kohler |
| DF | 6 | Guido Buchwald |
| MF | 8 | Thomas Häßler |
| FW | 9 | Karl-Heinz Riedle |
| SW | 10 | Lothar Matthäus (c) | | (substituted off) 64' |
| DF | 14 | Thomas Berthold |
| MF | 16 | Matthias Sammer |
| FW | 18 | Jürgen Klinsmann | (yellow card) 28' |
| MF | 20 | Stefan Effenberg | (yellow card) 44' | (substituted off) 75' |
Substitutions:
| DF | 5 | Thomas Helmer | | (substituted on) 75' |
| MF | 7 | Andreas Möller | | (substituted on) 64' |
Manager:
Berti Vogts

| GK | 1 | Choi In-young (c) | | (substituted off) 45' |
| DF | 4 | Kim Pan-keun |
| DF | 5 | Park Jung-bae |
| MF | 6 | Lee Young-jin | | (substituted off) 40' |
| MF | 7 | Shin Hong-gi |
| FW | 9 | Kim Joo-sung |
| FW | 10 | Ko Jeong-woon |
| DF | 12 | Choi Young-il | (yellow card) 89' |
| FW | 15 | Cho Jin-ho | | (substituted off) 45' |
| FW | 18 | Hwang Sun-hong |
| DF | 20 | Hong Myung-bo |
Substitutions:
| GK | 22 | Lee Woon-jae | | (substituted on) 45' |
| MF | 2 | Chung Jong-son | | (substituted on) 40' |
| FW | 11 | Seo Jung-won | | (substituted on) 45' |
Manager:
Kim Ho

Assistant referees:
Valentin Ivanov (Russia)
Abdel-Magid Hassan (Egypt)
Fourth official:
Arturo Angeles (United States)

== See also ==
- Bolivia at the FIFA World Cup
- Germany at the FIFA World Cup
- South Korea at the FIFA World Cup
- Spain at the FIFA World Cup
