= Costa Rica national football team results =

This article lists the Costa Rica national football team results. The national team is organised by the Federación Costarricense de Fútbol that was established in 1921. The team is nicknamed La Sele or Los Ticos. Costa Rica joined FIFA in 1927 and CONCACAF in 1962.

== Results ==
	Meaning
W.C.	FIFA World Cup
CC	Confederations Cup
GS	Group Stage
1/16	Round of 32
1/8	Round of 16
QF	Quarter-final
SF	Semi-final
F	Final
RP	Repechage
3rd-4th	Third place match

=== Prior to 1990 ===
Date	Home team	Away team	Score	Venue	Competition
10 June 1960	Costa Rica	Brazil	3–0	Estadio Nacional de Costa Rica	Panamerican Championship

Date	Home team	Away team	Score	Venue	Competition
2 August 1984	Costa Rica	Italy	1–0	Rose Bowl Stadium, California	1984 Summer Olympics

=== 1990–1999 ===
98 matches played:

2 February 1990 Friendly	United States	0–2	Costa Rica	(United States) Miami
				Attendance: 4,500

4 February 1990 Friendly	Uruguay	2–0	Costa Rica	(United States) Chicago

22 February 1990 Friendly	Soviet Union	2–1	Costa Rica	(United States) Chicago
				Attendance: 3,000

6 May 1990 Friendly	Poland	2–1	Costa Rica	(United States) Chicago
				Attendance: 33,000

19 May 1990 Friendly	Wales	1–0	Costa Rica	(Wales) , Cardiff
				Attendance: 18,000

11 June 1990 (Italy) 1990 W.C. GS	Costa Rica	1–0	Scotland	(Italy) Stadio Luigi Ferraris, Genoa
	Cayasso 49'			Attendance: 30,867; Referee: Juan Carlos Loustau Argentina

16 June 1990 (Italy) 1990 W.C. GS	Brazil	1–0	Costa Rica	(Italy) Stadio Delle Alpi, Turin
	Müller 33'			Attendance: 58,007; Referee: Neji Jouini Tunisia

20 June 1990 (Italy) 1990 W.C. GS	Costa Rica	2–1	Sweden	(Italy) Stadio Luigi Ferraris, Genoa
	Flores 75'; Medford 88'		Ekström 32'	Attendance: 30,223; Referee: Zoran Petrović Yugoslavia)

23 June 1990 (Italy) 1990 W.C. 1/8	Czechoslovakia	4–1	Costa Rica	(Italy) Stadio San Nicola, Bari
	Skuhravý 12', 63', 82'; Kubík 75'		González 54'	Attendance: 47,673; Referee: Siegfried Kirschen East Germany

17 April 1991 Friendly	Costa Rica	0–0	Mexico	Estadio Nacional de Costa Rica (1924), San José
				Attendance: 5,256

2 June 1991 Friendly	Costa Rica	0–1	Uruguay	Estadio Nacional de Costa Rica (1924), San José
				Attendance: 4,500

8 September 1991 (Costa Rica) 1991 UNC	Costa Rica	2–0	Honduras	Estadio Nacional de Costa Rica (1924), San José
				Attendance: 35,000

22 September 1991 (Costa Rica) 1991 UNC	Costa Rica	7–1	El Salvador	Estadio Nacional de Costa Rica (1924), San José
	Kushta 40'		4', 30', 61' Salinas; 19' Toni; 67' Caminero	Attendance: 3,000; Referee: (France) Rémy Harrel

13 October 1991 (Costa Rica) 1991 UNC	Costa Rica	1–0	Guatemala	Estadio Nacional de Costa Rica (1924), San José
	Sheridan 72'		12' Caminero; 19', 26' Salinas	Attendance: 33,000; Referee: (Italy) Fabio Baldas

17 November 1991 Friendly	Costa Rica	0–1	Colombia	Estadio Nacional de Costa Rica (1924), San José
	Hierro 63'			Attendance: 38,000; Referee: (Greece) Vassilios Nikakis

26 June 1991 (United States) 1991 Gold Cup	Costa Rica	2–0	Guatemala	(United States) Rose Bowl, Miami
	R. Gómez 14'; Flores 17'; González (red card) 86'	Report		Attendance: 18,435; Referee: Siefert (CAN)

9 February 1991 (United States) 1991 Gold Cup	Costa Rica	1–2	Trinidad and Tobago	(United States) Rose Bowl, Miami
	Medford 6'	Report	Lewis 38'; Thomas 89'	Attendance: 6,344; Referee: Garza (MEX)

23 March 1991 (United States) 1991 Gold Cup	United States	3–2	Costa Rica	(United States) Memorial Coliseum, Los Angeles
	Vermes 6'; Pérez 49' (pen.); Marchena 59' (o.g.)		Arguedas 30'; Jara 33'	Attendance: 36,703; Referee: Brizio Carter (MEX)

2 June 1991 (United States) 1991 Gold Cup	Honduras	2–0	Costa Rica	(United States) Memorial Coliseum, Los Angeles
	Bennett 38'; Flores 79'			Attendance: 41,103; Referee: Angeles (USA)

10 June 1991 (United States) 1991 Gold Cup	Mexico	2–0	Costa Rica	(United States) Memorial Coliseum, Los Angeles
	Farfán 9'; Galindo 89'	Report		Attendance: 39,873; Referee: Forbes (TRI)

18 June 1991 Friendly	United States	1–1	Costa Rica	(United States) Cotton Bowl, Dallas
01:35 CEST				Attendance: 56,247

21 June 1991 Friendly	Costa Rica	1–1	Mexico	Estadio Nacional de Costa Rica (1924), San José
22:05 CEST				Attendance: 13,113

27 June 1991 Friendly	Costa Rica	0–0	United States	Estadio Nacional de Costa Rica (1924), San José
22:05 CEST				Attendance: 13,089; Referee: (Costa Rica) Rodrigo Badilla

2 July 1991 Friendly	Costa Rica	2–0	El Salvador	Estadio Nacional de Costa Rica (1924), San José
23:35 CEST				Attendance: 53,121; Referee: (Netherlands) Mario van der Ende

9 July 1991 Friendly	El Salvador	1–1	Costa Rica	(El Salvador) Foxboro, Foxborough
19:05 CEST				Attendance: 23,400; Referee: (Uruguay) Sándor Puhl

7 September 1991 Friendly	Costa Rica	2 –1	Ecuador	Estadio Nacional de Costa Rica (1924), San José
				Attendance: 10,000

18 June 1994 Friendly	Uruguay	2–1	Costa Rica	(United States) Cotton Bowl, Dallas
01:35 CEST				Attendance: 26,247

21 June 1994 Friendly	Ecuador	1–1	Costa Rica	(United States) Soldier Field, Chicago
22:05 CEST				Attendance: 63,113; Referee: (Uruguay) Filippi Cavani

27 June 1994 1994 W.C. Q	Panama	1–0	Costa Rica	(United States) Soldier Field, Chicago
22:05 CEST	Sánchez 66'		19' (pen.) Guardiola; 65', 71' Caminero	Attendance: 63,089; Referee: (Costa Rica) Rodrigo Badilla

2 July 1994 1994 W.C. Q	Costa Rica	5–1	Panama	(Costa Rica) Estadio Alejandro Morera Soto, Alajuela
23:35 CEST	Hierro 14'; Luis Enrique 73'; Begiristain 86' (pen.)			Attendance: 53,121

9 July 1994 Friendly	Brazil	4–2	Costa Rica	(United States) Foxboro, Foxborough
19:05 CEST	Baggio 26'; R. Baggio 87'		59' Caminero	Attendance: 53,400; Referee: (Uruguay) Sándor Puhl

7 September 1994 1994 W.C. Q	Costa Rica	2 –3	Honduras	Estadio Nacional de Costa Rica (1924), San José
	Sotiriou 37'		18', 25' Higuera	Attendance: 10,000; Referee: (France) Marc Batta

7 September 1994 1994 W.C. Q	Saint Vincent and the Grenadines	0 –1	Costa Rica	(Cyprus) Tsirion, Limassol
	Sotiriou 37'		18', 25' Higuera	Attendance: 10,000; Referee: (France) Marc Batta

2 June 1993 1994 W.C. Q	Mexico	4–0	Costa Rica	(Lithuania) Žalgiris, Vilnius
			72', 75' Guerrero	Attendance: 4,500; Referee: (Romania) George Ionescu

8 September 1993 Friendly	Costa Rica	2–0	Mexico	Estadio Nacional de Costa Rica (1924), San José
	Guerrero 61', 89' (pen.)			Attendance: 35,000; Referee: (Portugal) Vítor Melo Pereira

22 September 1993 1994 W.C. Q	Honduras	2–1	Costa Rica	(Albania) Qemal Stafa, Tirana
	Kushta 40'		4', 30', 61' Salinas; 19' Toni; 67' Caminero	Attendance: 3,000; Referee: (France) Rémy Harrel

13 October 1993 1994 W.C. Q	Costa Rica	5–0	Saint Vincent and the Grenadines	Estadio Nacional de Costa Rica (1924), San José
	Sheridan 72'		12' Caminero; 19', 26' Salinas	Attendance: 33,000; Referee: (Italy) Fabio Baldas

17 November 1993 (Honduras) 1993 UNC	Costa Rica	6–0	Nicaragua	Estadio Nacional de Costa Rica (1924), San José
	Hierro 63'			Attendance: 38,000; Referee: (Greece) Vassilios Nikakis

19 January 1994 (Honduras) 1993 UNC	Costa Rica	2–0	Nicaragua	(Honduras)
	Salinas 42'; Juanele 66'		62' (o.g.) Juanma; 83' (pen.) Oceano	Attendance: 32,000; Referee: (Italy) Fabio Baldas

9 February 1994 (Honduras) 1993 UNC	Costa Rica	1–0	El Salvador	(Spain) H. Rodríguez López, Tenerife, Canary Islands
	Sergi 19'		38' Kosecki	Attendance: 20,000; Referee: (England) Roman Kosecki

23 March 1994 (Honduras) 1993 UNC	Honduras	2–0	Costa Rica	(Spain) Luis Casanova, Valencia
			6' Prosinečki; 51' Šuker	Attendance: 40,000; Referee: (France) Gilles Veissière

2 June 1994 Friendly	Costa Rica	2–0	Panama	Estadio Nacional de Costa Rica (1924), San José
	Järvinen 17'		11' Miñambres; 15' Salinas	Attendance: 10,251; Referee: (Sweden) Christer Fällström

10 June 1994 Friendly	Costa Rica	0–1	Canada	Estadio Nacional de Costa Rica (1924), San José
			9' Salinas; 85' Juanele	Attendance: 5,256; Referee: (England) Mike Reed

18 June 1994 (United States) 1994 W.C. GS	Colombia	4–1	Costa Rica	(United States) Cotton Bowl, Dallas
01:35 CEST	Salinas 50'; Goikoetxea 55'		84' Hong Myung-bo; 90' Seo Jung-won	Attendance: 56,247; Referee: (Denmark) Peter Mikkelsen

21 June 1994 Friendly	Costa Rica	3–1	Panama	(Costa Rica) Estadio Alejandro Morera Soto, Alajuela
22:05 CEST	Klinsmann 48'		14' Goikoetxea	Attendance: 63,113; Referee: (Uruguay) Filippi Cavani

27 June 1994 Friendly	Costa Rica	0–2	Mexico	Estadio Nacional de Costa Rica (1924), San José
22:05 CEST	Sánchez 66'		19' (pen.) Guardiola; 65', 71' Caminero	Attendance: 63,089; Referee: (Costa Rica) Rodrigo Badilla

2 July 1994 (United States) 1994 W.C. 1/8	Jamaica	1–1	Costa Rica	(United States) RFK Memorial, Washington
23:35 CEST	Hierro 14'; Luis Enrique 73'; Begiristain 86' (pen.)			Attendance: 53,121; Referee: (Netherlands) Mario van der Ende

11 July (Mexico) (United States) 1993 Gold Cup	Canada	1–1	Costa Rica	Estadio Azteca, Mexico City
	Dasovic 43'	Report	Myers 82'	Attendance: 17,000; Referee: Forde (BAR)

7 September 1994 (Mexico) (United States) 1993 Gold Cup	Mexico	1 –1	Costa Rica	Estadio Azteca, Mexico City
	Delgado 74' (o.g.)	Report	Cayasso 30'	Attendance: 80,000; Referee: Ramdhan (TRI)

12 October 1994 (Mexico) (United States) 1993 Gold Cup	Costa Rica	3–1	Martinique	Estadio Azteca, Mexico City
	Myers 28'; Cayasso 69', 87'		Tinmar 59' (pen.)	Attendance: 59,000; Referee: Jay (USA)

16 November 1994 (Mexico) (United States) 1993 Gold Cup	United States	1–0 (asdet)	Costa Rica	(United States) Cotton Bowl, Dallas
	Kooiman 103'			Attendance: 14,826; Referee: Ramdhan (TRI)

30 November 1994 (Mexico) (United States) 1993 Gold Cup	Costa Rica	1–1 (a.e.t.)	Jamaica	Estadio Azteca, Mexico City
	Guthrie 10'		Jarret 89'	Attendance: 100,000; Referee: Hayes (USA)

17 December 1994 Friendly	Saudi Arabia	1–2	Costa Rica	(Belgium) Constant Vanden Stock, Brussels
	Degryse 6'		29' Hierro; 56' (pen.) Donato; 69' Salinas; 89' Luis Enrique	Attendance: 15,074; Referee: (Turkey) Ahmet Çakar

18 January 1995 Friendly	Saudi Arabia	3–2	Costa Rica	(Spain) Riazor, A Coruña
	Pizzi 1'; Donato 81'		18' Fonseca; 34' Bengoechea	Attendance: 22,000; Referee: (Bulgaria) Atanas Uzunov

22 February 1995 Friendly	Costa Rica	0–0	Norway	(United States) Chapín, Jerez de la Frontera, Cádiz
				Attendance: 19,000

29 March 1995 Friendly	Italy	1–0	Costa Rica	(United States) Ramón Sánchez Pizjuán, Sevilla
	Higuera 24'		26' Degryse	Attendance: 27,000

26 April 1995 Friendly	Saudi Arabia	1–3	Costa Rica	(Armenia) Hrazdan, Yerevan
			49' Amavisca; 63' Goikoetxea	Attendance: 35,000; Referee: (Romania) Adrian Porumboiu

7 June 1995 Friendly	United States	1–2	Costa Rica	(Spain) Ramón Sánchez Pizjuán, Sevilla
	Hierro 64' (pen.)			Attendance: 12,000; Referee: (Luxembourg) Roger Philippi

6 September 1995 Friendly	South Korea	1–0	Costa Rica	(Spain) Nuevo Los Cármenes, Granada
	Guerrero 45'; Alfonso 50'; Pizzi 75', 84'; Hierro 83'; Caminero 85'			Attendance: 16,150; Referee: (Netherlands) Dick Jol

20 September 1995 Friendly	Ecuador	2–1	Costa Rica	(South Korea) Vicente Calderón, Madrid
	Pizzi 35'; Guerrero 68'		80' Ortega	Attendance: 50,000; Referee: (Greece) Sotiris Vorgias

11 October 1995 Friendly	Japan	3–0	Costa Rica	(Japan) Parken, Copenhagen
	Vilfort 46'		17' (pen.) Hierro	Attendance: 40,262; Referee: (Czech Republic) Václav Krondl

15 November 1995 Friendly	Jamaica	2–0	Costa Rica	(Spain) Martínez Valero, Elche, Alicante
	Kiko 8'; Manjarín 72'; Caminero 79'			Attendance: 21,350; Referee: (Germany) Edgar Steinborn

7 February 1996 (El Salvador) 1995 UNC	Costa Rica	2–1	Belize	(Spain) Insular, Las Palmas de G.C., Canary Islands
	Kiko 44'			Attendance: 18,500; Referee: (Italy) Marcello Nicchi

24 April 1996 (El Salvador) 1995 UNC	El Salvador	2–1	Costa Rica	(Norway) Ullevaal, Oslo
				Attendance: 11,898; Referee: (Germany) Georg Dardenne

9 June 1996 (El Salvador) 1995 UNC	Honduras	1–1	Costa Rica	(England) Elland Road, Leeds
15:30 CEST	Alfonso 73'		64' (pen.) Stoichkov	Attendance: 24,006; Referee: (Italy) Piero Ceccarini

15 June 1996 (El Salvador) 1995 UNC	El Salvador	2–1	Costa Rica	(England) Elland Road, Leeds
19:00 CEST	Djorkaeff 48'		87' Caminero	Attendance: 35,626; Referee: (Belarus) Vadim Zhuk

18 June 1996 Friendly	Canada	0 –1	Costa Rica	(England) Elland Road, Leeds
17:30 CEST	Raducioiu 29'		10' Manjarín; 83' Amor	Attendance: 32,719; Referee: (Turkey) Ahmet Çakar

22 June 1996 Friendly	Costa Rica	1–1 (4–2 p)	Honduras	Estadio Nacional de Costa Rica (1924), San José
16:00 CEST				Attendance: 75,440; Referee: (France) Marc Batta
	Penalties
	Shearer (penalty scored); Platt (penalty scored); Pearce (penalty scored); Gascoigne (penalty scored)		(penalty missed) Hierro; (penalty scored) Amor; (penalty scored) Belsúe; (penalty missed) Nadal

4 September 1996 Friendly	Honduras	0–0	Costa Rica	(Faroe Islands) Svangaskard, Toftir
	Jónsson 46'; Arge 89'		37' Luis Enrique; 63', 83', 86' Alfonso; 70' (o.g.) Johannesen; 85' Hierro	Attendance: 4,200; Referee: (France) Philippe Leduc

9 October 1996 Friendly	Peru	3–0	Costa Rica	Cusco, Peru
				Attendance: 19,223

13 November 1996 Friendly	Ecuador	1–1	Costa Rica	(Spain) H. Rodríguez López, Tenerife, Canary Islands
	Pizzi 39'; Amor 46'; Luis Enrique 57'; Hierro 61'		40' Tittel	Attendance: 13,500; Referee: (Germany) Markus Merk

14 December 1996 Friendly	Costa Rica	1–1	Chile	(Costa Rica) Estadio Edgardo Baltodabo, Liberia
	Guardiola 18' (pen.); Raúl 37'			Attendance: 37,000

18 December 1996 1998 W.C. Q	Trinidad and Tobago	0–1	Costa Rica	(Malta) National Stadium, Ta'Qali
			7', 26', 33' Guerrero	Attendance: 3,200; Referee: (Russia) Nikolai Levnikov

12 February 1997 (France) 1998 W.C. Q	Jamaica	2–0	Costa Rica	(Spain) Rico Pérez, Alicante
	Guardiola 25'; Alfonso 40', 46'; Pizzi 89'			Attendance: 28,000; Referee: (England) Stephen Lodge

30 April 1997 (France) 1998 W.C. Q	Venezuela	2–0	Costa Rica	(Federal Republic of Yugoslavia) Crvena Zvezda, Belgrade
	Mijatovic 86' (pen.)		18' (pen.) Hierro	Attendance: 49,253; Referee: (Norway) Rune Pedersen

8 June 1997 Friendly	Costa Rica	0–0	Jamaica	Estadio Nacional de Costa Rica (1924), San José
	Hierro 40' (pen.)			Attendance: 24,544; Referee: (Scotland) Hugh Dallas

24 September 1997 Friendly	Costa Rica	2–0	Panama	(Slovakia) Tehelne Pole, Bratislava
	Majoroš 75'		46' Kiko; 76' Amor	Attendance: 13,667; Referee: (Hungary) Laszlo Vagner

11 October 1997 1998 W.C. Q	Costa Rica	3–0	Guatemala	(Costa Rica) Estadio Ricardo Saprissa Aymá, San José
	Luis Enrique 19', 84'; Oli 27'		44' Hansen	Attendance: 25,000; Referee: (Poland) Jacek Granat

19 November 1997 1998 W.C. Q	Guatemala	1–0	Costa Rica	(United States) Memorial Coliseum Estadium, Los Angeles
	Etxeberria 49'		82' Popescu	Attendance: 30,000; Referee: (Italy) Fiorenzo Treossi

28 January 1998 1998 W.C. Q	Costa Rica	2–1	United States	(Costa Rica) Estadio Ricardo Saprissa Aymá, San José
	Zidane 20'			Attendance: 18,836; Referee: (Switzerland) Urs Meier

25 March 1998 1998 W.C. Q	United States	2–1	Costa Rica	(Spain) Balaídos, Vigo, Pontevedra
	Morientes 2', 6'; Raúl 31'; Etxeberria 70'			Attendance: 17,000; Referee: (Germany) Georg Dardenne

3 June 1998 1998 W.C. Q	Costa Rica	2–1	Trinidad and Tobago	(Costa Rica) Estadio Jose Rafael Fello Meza, Cartago
	Pizzi 29', 37'; Morientes 47', 67'		43' Gerry	Attendance: 18,120; Referee: (France) Gilles Veissière

13 June 1998 Friendly	Costa Rica	2–2	Slovakia	(Costa Rica) Estadio Alejandro Morera Soto, Alajuela
14:30 CEST	Adepoju 25'; Zubizarreta 73' (o.g.); Oliseh 78'		21' Hierro; 47' Raúl	Attendance: 33,257; Referee: (United States) Esfandiar Baharmast

19 June 1998 Friendly	Costa Rica	5–2	Venezuela	(Costa Rica) Estadio Eladio Rosabal Cordero, Heredia
21:00 CEST				Attendance: 30,600

24 June 1998 Friendly	Costa Rica	5–0	Cameroon	(Costa Rica) Estadio Ricardo Saprissa Aymá, San José
21:00 CEST	Hierro 5' (pen.); Luis Enrique 18'; Morientes 52', 83'; Kiko 86', 90'		57' Kostadinov	Attendance: 38,100; Referee: (Netherlands) Mario van der Ende

5 September 1998 1998 W.C. Q	Costa Rica	0–0	Mexico	(Costa Rica) Estadio Ricardo Saprissa Aymá, San José
	Engomitis 43'; Gogić 49'; Spoljarić 77'		73' Raúl; 90' Morientes	Attendance: 1,876

23 September 1998 Friendly	Costa Rica	3–2	United States	(Costa Rica) Estadio Ricardo Saprissa Aymá, San José
	Alkiza 39'			Attendance: 16,000; Referee: (Morocco) Said Belqola

14 October 1998 (Guatemala) 1997 UNC	Guatemala	1–1	Costa Rica	(Israel) Ramat Gan, Ramat Gan
	Hazan 64'		66' Hierro; 78' Etxeberria	Attendance: 37,000; Referee: (England) David Elleray

18 November 1998 (Guatemala) 1997 UNC	Costa Rica	5–1	Nicaragua	(Italy) Arechi, Salerno
	Inzaghi 13', 74'		33' Javi; 82' (pen.) Raúl	Attendance: 17,981; Referee: (Belgium) Fernand Meese

27 March 1999 (Guatemala) 1997 UNC	Costa Rica	4–0	Honduras	(Spain) Mestalla, Valencia
	Raúl 6', 17', 47', 75'; Urzaiz 30', 44'; Hierro 35' (pen.); Wetl 76' (o.g.); Fran 84'			Attendance: 45,000; Referee: (France) Gilles Veissière

31 March 1999 (Guatemala) 1997 UNC	Costa Rica	1–0	El Salvador	(San Marino) Olimpico, Serravalle
			20' Fran; 45', 59', 66' Raúl; 49' Urzaiz; 72' Etxeberría	Attendance: 1,500; Referee: (Croatia) Goran Maric

5 May 1999 (Guatemala) 1997 UNC	Guatemala	1–1	Costa Rica	(Spain) Olímpico de La Cartuja, Sevilla
	Engonga 34'; Hierro 48' (pen.); Dani 84'		10' Šuker	Attendance: 57,000; Referee: (Italy) Pierluigi Collina

5 June 1999 1998 W.C. Q	El Salvador	2–1	Costa Rica	(Spain) El Madrigal, Vila-Real, Castellón
	Hierro 8'; Luis Enrique 23', 67', 67'; Etxeberría 25', 45'; Raúl 56'; Mirco Gennari 87' (o.g.); Mendieta 90'			Attendance: 16,000; Referee: (Republic of Ireland) Gerard Perry

18 August 1999 1998 W.C. Q	Costa Rica	3–1	Jamaica	(Costa Rica) Estadio Ricardo Saprissa Aymá, San José
	Hajto 7'		54' Morientes; 66' Munitis	Attendance: 8,000; Referee: (Russia) Sergey Husainov

4 September 1999 1998 W.C. Q	Canada	1–0	Costa Rica	(Austria) Ernst-Happel, Vienna
	Hierro 49' (o.g.)		22' Raúl; 56' Hierro; 88' Luis Enrique	Attendance: 27,000; Referee: (Belgium) Michel Piraux

8 September 1999 (Bolivia) 1997 Copa América	Brazil	5–0	Costa Rica	(Bolivia) Nuevo Vivero, Badajoz
	Urzaiz 20', 25', 38'; Guerrero 33', 42', 56'; César 82'; Hierro 88'			Attendance: 12,500; Referee: (Italy) Alfredo Trentalange

10 October 1999 (Bolivia) 1997 Copa América	Colombia	4–1	Costa Rica	(Bolivia) Carlos Belmonte, Albacete
	Morientes 30'; César 37'; Raúl 51'			Attendance: 16,100; Referee: (Germany) Hellmut Krug

13 November 1999 (Bolivia) 1997 Copa América	Costa Rica	1–1	Mexico	(Bolivia) Balaídos, Vigo, Pontevedra
				Attendance: 31,000; Referee: (Netherlands) René Temmink

17 November 1999 1998 W.C. Q	Costa Rica	0–0	El Salvador	(Costa Rica) Estadio Ricardo Saprissa Aymá, San José
			40' González; 76' Pochettino	Attendance: 65,000; Referee: (Greece) Giorgos Psyhomanis

5 May 1999 1998 W.C. Q	United States	1–0	Costa Rica	(Spain) Olímpico de La Cartuja, Sevilla
	Engonga 34'; Hierro 48' (pen.); Dani 84'		10' Šuker	Attendance: 57,000; Referee: (Italy) Pierluigi Collina

5 June 1999 1998 W.C. Q	Jamaica	1–0	Costa Rica	(Spain) El Madrigal, Vila-Real, Castellón
	Hierro 8'; Luis Enrique 23', 67', 67'; Etxeberría 25', 45'; Raúl 56'; Mirco Gennari 87' (o.g.); Mendieta 90'			Attendance: 16,000; Referee: (Republic of Ireland) Gerard Perry

18 August 1999 1998 W.C. Q	Mexico	3–3	Costa Rica	(Poland) Wojska Polskiego, Warsaw
			54' Morientes; 66' Munitis	Attendance: 8,000; Referee: (Russia) Sergey Husainov

4 September 1999 1998 W.C. Q	Costa Rica	3–1	Canada	Estadio Nacional de Costa Rica (1924), San José
	Hierro 49' (o.g.)		22' Raúl; 56' Hierro; 88' Luis Enrique	Attendance: 27,000; Referee: (Belgium) Michel Piraux

8 September 1999 Friendly	Costa Rica	1–4	Honduras	Estadio Edgardo Baltodano, Liberia, Costa Rica
	Urzaiz 20', 25', 38'; Guerrero 33', 42', 56'; César 82'; Hierro 88'			Attendance: 12,500; Referee: (Italy) Alfredo Trentalange

10 October 1999 Friendly	Costa Rica	4–0	Trinidad and Tobago	(Costa Rica) Estadio Alejandro Morera Soto, Alajuela
	Morientes 30'; César 37'; Raúl 51'			Attendance: 16,100; Referee: (Germany) Hellmut Krug

13 November 1999 (United States) 1998 Gold Cup	Costa Rica	7–2	Cuba	United States Oakland Coliseum, Oakland
	Berry 3'; Wanchope 21', 32', 64', 78'; López 29' (pen.); Myers 44'		Marten-Pellicier 50'; Cebranco-Rodríguez 90'	Attendance: 17,256; Referee: Arturo Brizio Carter (Mexico)

17 November 1999 (United States) 1998 Gold Cup	United States	2–1	Costa Rica	United StatesOakland Coliseum, Oakland
	Pope 7'; Preki 78'		Oviedo 56'	Attendance: 36,240; Referee: Mohammed Nazri (Malaysia)

5 May 1999 Friendly	Costa Rica	0–0	Ecuador	(Costa Rica) Estadio Alejandro Morera Soto, Alajuela
	Engonga 34'; Hierro 48' (pen.); Dani 84'		10' Šuker	Attendance: 57,000; Referee: (Italy) Pierluigi Collina

24 February 1999 Friendly	Jamaica	1–1	Costa Rica	(Jamaica) National Stadium, Kingston
	Burton 8'		Drummond 35'	Attendance: 16,000; Referee: (Trinidad and Tobago) Ramesh Ramdhan

18 August 1999 Friendly	Costa Rica	9–0	Jamaica	(Costa Rica) Estadio Ricardo Saprissa Aymá, San José
	Hajto 7'		54' Morientes; 66' Munitis	Attendance: 8,000; Referee: (Russia) Sergey Husainov

4 September 1999 (Costa Rica) 1999 UNC	Costa Rica	7–0	Belize	Estadio Nacional de Costa Rica (1924), San José
	Hierro 49' (o.g.)		22' Raúl; 56' Hierro; 88' Luis Enrique	Attendance: 27,000; Referee: (Belgium) Michel Piraux

8 September 1999 (Costa Rica) 1999 UNC	Costa Rica	0–1	Honduras	Estadio Nacional de Costa Rica (1924), San José
	Urzaiz 20', 25', 38'; Guerrero 33', 42', 56'; César 82'; Hierro 88'			Attendance: 12,500; Referee: (Italy) Alfredo Trentalange

10 October 1999 (Costa Rica) 1999 UNC	Costa Rica	1–0	Guatemala	Estadio Nacional de Costa Rica (1924), San José
	Morientes 30'; César 37'; Raúl 51'			Attendance: 16,100; Referee: (Germany) Hellmut Krug

13 November 1999 (Costa Rica) 1999 UNC	Costa Rica	1–2	Honduras	Estadio Nacional de Costa Rica (1924), San José
				Attendance: 31,000; Referee: (Netherlands) René Temmink

17 November 1999 (Costa Rica) 1999 UNC	Costa Rica	4–0	El Salvador	Estadio Nacional de Costa Rica (1924), San José
			40' González; 76' Pochettino	Attendance: 65,000; Referee: (Greece) Giorgos Psyhomanis

5 May 1999 Friendly	Chile	3–0	Costa Rica	(Spain) Olímpico de La Cartuja, Sevilla
	Engonga 34'; Hierro 48' (pen.); Dani 84'		10' Šuker	Attendance: 57,000; Referee: (Italy) Pierluigi Collina

5 June 1999 Friendly	Costa Rica	1–0	Saudi Arabia	(Spain) El Madrigal, Vila-Real, Castellón
	Hierro 8'; Luis Enrique 23', 67', 67'; Etxeberría 25', 45'; Raúl 56'; Mirco Gennari 87' (o.g.); Mendieta 90'			Attendance: 16,000; Referee: (Republic of Ireland) Gerard Perry

18 August 1999 Friendly	Uruguay	5–4	Costa Rica	(Uruguay) Estadio Centenario, Montevideo
	Hajto 7'		54' Morientes; 66' Munitis	Attendance: 28,000; Referee: (Russia) Sergey Husainov

4 September 1999 Friendly	Costa Rica	4–0	Slovakia	(Costa Rica) Estadio Alejandro Morera Soto, Alajuela
	Hierro 49' (o.g.)		22' Raúl; 56' Hierro; 88' Luis Enrique	Attendance: 27,000; Referee: (Belgium) Michel Piraux

8 September 1999 Friendly	Costa Rica	1–1	Honduras	(Costa Rica) Estadio Alejandro Morera Soto, Alajuela
	Urzaiz 20', 25', 38'; Guerrero 33', 42', 56'; César 82'; Hierro 88'			Attendance: 12,500; Referee: (Italy) Alfredo Trentalange

== See also ==
- Costa Rica at the Copa América
