= 1997 Copa América final =

- Event: 1997 Copa América
Brazil	Bolivia
(Brazil)	(Bolivia)
3	1
- Date: 29 June 1997
- Venue: Estadio Hernando Siles, La Paz
- Referee: Jorge Nieves (Uruguay)
- Weather: Scattered clouds 6 °C (43 °F)

The 1997 Copa América final was the final match of the 38th edition of the Copa America tournament. The match was held on 29 June 1997, in Estadio Hernando Siles Stadium at La Paz, Bolivia. Brazil won the match against hosts Bolivia by a 3–1 score. This was the fifth Copa América clinched by Brazil and their first Copa América trophy outside their home nation.

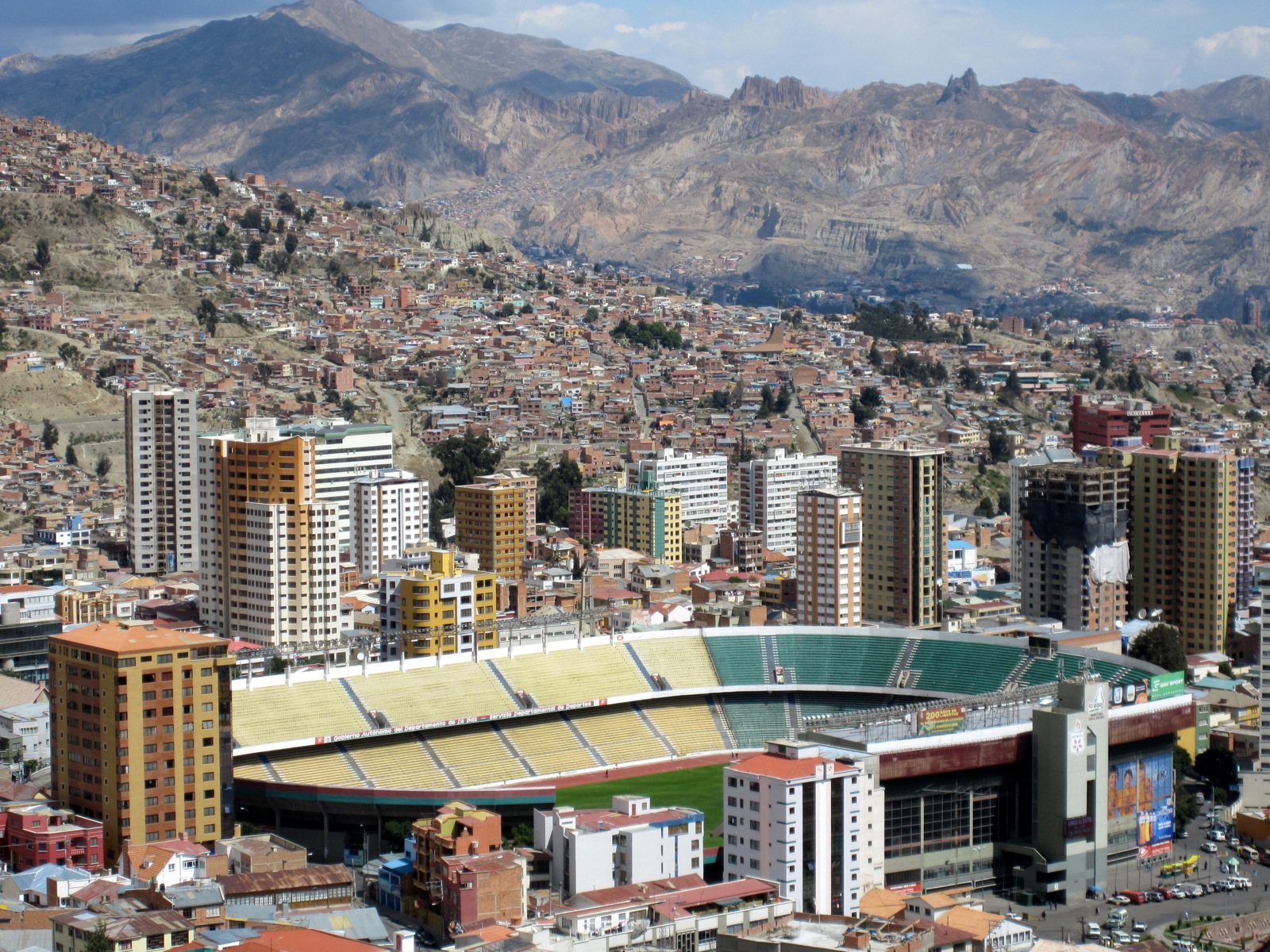
Estadio Hernado Siles in La Paz, venue

== Route to the final ==
Brazil
Round
Bolivia
Opponent
Result
Group stage
Opponent
Result
Costa Rica
5–0
Match 1
Venezuela
1–0
Mexico
3–2
Match 2
Peru
2–0
Colombia
2–0
Match 3
Uruguay
1–0
Group C winner

Team	Pld	W	D	L	GF	GA	GD	Pts
Brazil	3	3	0	0	10	2	+8	9
Mexico	3	1	1	1	5	5	0	4
Colombia	3	1	0	2	5	5	0	3
Costa Rica	3	0	1	2	2	10	−8	1

Source: RSSSF
Final standings
Group B winner

Team	Pld	W	D	L	GF	GA	GD	Pts
Bolivia	3	3	0	0	4	0	+4	9
Peru	3	2	0	1	3	2	+1	6
Uruguay	3	1	0	2	2	2	0	3
Venezuela	3	0	0	3	0	5	−5	0

Source: RSSSF
Opponent
Result
Knockout stage
Opponent
Result
Paraguay
2–0
Quarter-finals
Colombia
2–1
Peru
7–0
Semi-finals
Mexico
3–1

== Match details ==
29 June 1997
17:10 (UTC-4)

Brazil	3–1	Bolivia
Denílson 40'; Ronaldo 79'; Zé Roberto 90'		E. Sánchez 45'

Estadio Hernando Siles, La Paz
Attendance: 46,000
Referee: Jorge Nieves (Uruguay)

Brazil	Bolivia

GK	1	Cláudio Taffarel
RB	2	Cafu
CB	3	Aldair
CB	16	Marcelo Gonçalves
LB	6	Roberto Carlos
CM	8	Dunga (c)
CM	19	Flávio Conceição		(substituted off) 62'
RW	21	Edmundo		(substituted off) 67'
AM	10	Leonardo		(substituted off) 79'
LW	20	Denílson
CF	9	Ronaldo
Substitutions:
MF	5	Mauro Silva	(yellow card) 84'	(substituted on) 79'
MF	17	Zé Roberto		(substituted on) 62'
FW	22	Paulo Nunes		(substituted on) 67'
Manager:
Mário Zagallo

GK	1	Carlos Trucco
CB	5	Óscar Sánchez
CB	2	Juan Manuel Peña
CB	3	Marco Sandy
DM	16	Luis Cristaldo	(yellow card) 28'
DM	6	Vladimir Soria (c)
CM	7	Sergio Castillo
AM	22	Julio César Baldivieso
AM	21	Erwin Sánchez	(yellow card) 90'
CF	9	Jaime Moreno		(substituted off) 74'
CF	10	Marco Etcheverry
Substitutions:
FW	18	Milton Coimbra		(substituted on) 74'
Manager:
(Spain) Antonio López Habas
