= Freddy Valda =

Bolivian footballer (1932–2003)

Personal information
- Full name: Freddy Valda García
- Date of birth: 23 March 1932
- Place of birth: Sucre, Bolivia
- Date of death: 24 September 2003 (aged 71)
- Place of death: Santa Cruz, Bolivia
- Position: Forward

Senior career*
| Years | Team | Apps | (Gls) |
| 1952 | The Strongest | | |
| 1958–1960 | Chaco Petrolero | | |
| 1961 | Club Olympic La Paz | | |
| 1961 | → Always Ready (loan) | | |
| 1962 | Club Bolívar | | |

International career
| 1959 | Bolivia | 2+ | (0) |

Managerial career
- 1965: Bolivia
- 1967: Club Bolívar
- 1969: The Strongest
- 1969: Bolivia
- 1970–1971: The Strongest
- 1972: Chaco Petrolero
- 1973: Bolivia
- 1975: Bolivia
- 1977–1978: The Strongest
- 1984: The Strongest
- 1995: Independiente Petrolero
- Club Destroyers
- Real Santa Cruz
- * Club domestic league appearances and goals

Freddy Valda García (23 March 1932 – 24 September 2003) was a Bolivian footballer and manager who played as a forward.

== Playing career ==
Valda played for The Strongest, Chaco Petrolero, Club Olympic La Paz, and Club Bolívar, primarily in leagues ran by the La Paz Football Association. While at Chaco Petrolero, he formed an attack partnership with Abdúl Aramayo, Hilarión López, and Fortunato Castillo. Notably, he was the top goalscorer of the La Paz Football Association's leagues four times in a row between 1959 and 1962. In 1961, he was loaned to Always Ready for their tour of Europe. He retired from football following the 1962 season.

He made two appearances for the Bolivia national team at the 1959 South American Championship in Argentina.

== Managerial career ==
Valda managed the Bolivia national team four separate times between 1965 and 1975, notably coaching them during 1970 FIFA World Cup qualification, where they failed to qualify after finishing only a point behind Peru and the 1975 Copa América.

He also managed Club Bolívar, The Strongest, Oriente Petrolero, Chaco Petrolero, Club Destroyers, and Real Santa Cruz.

== Personal life and death ==
After retiring from coaching, Valda became the director of a football coaching school. He died in Santa Cruz on 24 September 2003, at the age of 71.
