= José Milton Melgar =

Bolivian footballer (born 1959)

Milton Melgar
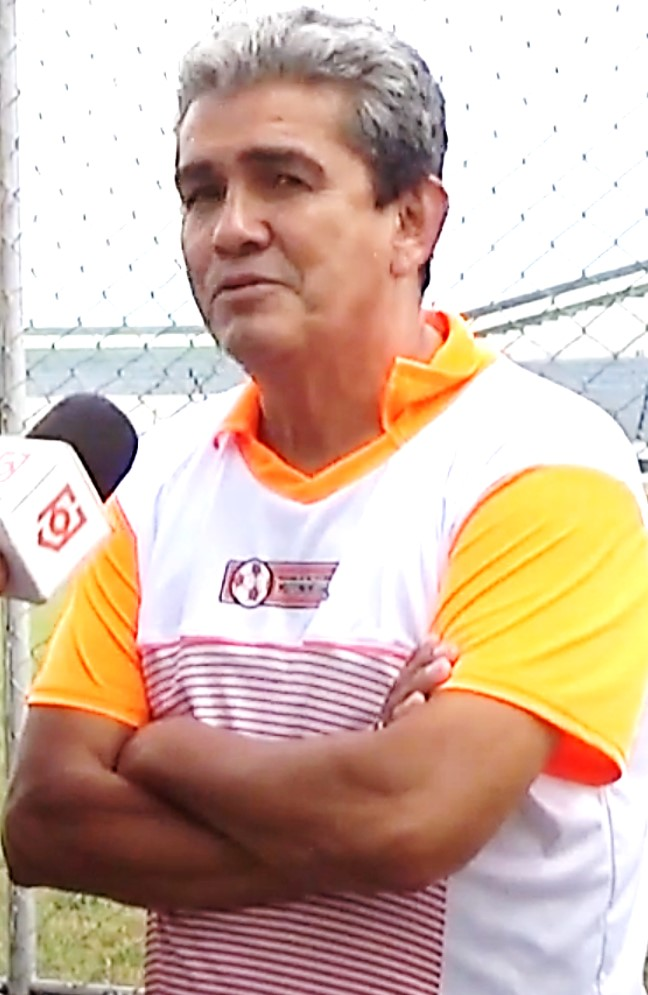
- Melgar in 2019

Personal information
- Full name: José Milton Melgar Soruco
- Date of birth: September 20, 1959 (age 67)
- Place of birth: Santa Cruz de la Sierra, Bolivia
- Height: 1.76 m (5 ft 9 in)
- Position: Midfielder

Senior career*
Years	Team	Apps	(Gls)
1979–1985	Blooming	189	(46)
1985–1988	Boca Juniors	92	(3)
1988–1989	River Plate	23	(0)
1989–1990	Bolívar	22	(3)
1990	Oriente Petrolero	40	(5)
1991	Blooming	21	(1)
1992	Everton (VdM)	31	(2)
1993	The Strongest	25	(0)
1994–1995	Cobreloa	21	(2)
1995	Bolívar	20	(0)
1996	Real Santa Cruz	22	(2)
1997	Blooming	20	(1)
Total		526	(65)

International career
1980–1997	Bolivia	89	(6)

Managerial career
- 2000: Oriente Petrolero
- 2000: Blooming
- 2002–2003: Bolivia U20
- 2003: Oriente Petrolero
- * Club domestic league appearances and goals

José Milton Melgar Soruco (born September 20, 1959) is a Bolivian former football player and manager who played as a midfielder. In 2006, he was appointed by the Bolivian Government under President Evo Morales as Minister of Sports, but he resigned a year later. He currently runs his own youth football academy in his hometown.

== Playing career ==
=== Club ===
At the club level, Melgar played for Blooming, Bolívar, Oriente Petrolero and Real Santa Cruz in Bolivia, as well as Everton (VdM) and Cobreloa in Chile.

He also played in Argentina for the two giants and fierce rivals Boca Juniors and River Plate.

In addition, during his career, he also had 53 Copa Libertadores appearances with 2 goals scored.

=== International ===
Melgar was capped 89 times and scored 6 international goals for Bolivia between 1980 and 1997. His tally of 89 caps was a national record until January 31, 2002, when it was broken by Marco Sandy who obtained his 90th cap in a friendly match against Brazil. Melgar played all three matches at the 1994 FIFA World Cup, and his club at that time was The Strongest.

== Managerial career ==
Following his retirement, Melgar pursued a managerial career. In 2000, he made his official debut as manager with Oriente Petrolero. Later in the year he also managed Blooming. In October 2002 he assumed his duties as the U-17 and U-20 national teams, but his stint was unsuccessful.

== Career statistics ==
Scores and results list Bolivia's goal tally first, score column indicates score after each Melgar goal.

List of international goals scored by José Milton Melgar
No.	Date	Venue	Opponent	Score	Result	Competition
1	31 August 1983	Estadio El Campín, Bogotá, Colombia	Colombia	1–2	2–2	1983 Copa América
2	20 August 1989	Estadio Hernando Siles, La Paz, Bolivia	Peru	1–1	2–1	1990 FIFA World Cup qualification
3	8 August 1993	Estadio Hernando Siles, La Paz, Bolivia	Uruguay	3–0	3–1	1994 FIFA World Cup qualification
4	22 August 1993	Estadio Hernando Siles, La Paz, Bolivia	Venezuela	2–0	7–0	1994 FIFA World Cup qualification
5	22 August 1993	Estadio Hernando Siles, La Paz, Bolivia	Venezuela	7–0	7–0	1994 FIFA World Cup qualification
6	14 May 1995	Estadio Félix Capriles, Cochabamba, Bolivia	Paraguay	1–1	1–1	Friendly

== Honours ==
Blooming

- Liga de Fútbol Profesional Boliviano: 1984

Oriente Petrolero

- Liga de Fútbol Profesional Boliviano: 1990

The Strongest

- Liga de Fútbol Profesional Boliviano: 1993
