= Xabier Azkargorta =

Spanish footballer (1953–2025)

Personal information
- Full name: Francisco Xabier Azkargorta Uriarte
- Date of birth: 26 September 1953
- Place of birth: Azpeitia, Spain
- Date of death: 14 November 2025 (aged 72)
- Place of death: Santa Cruz de la Sierra, Bolivia
- Height: 1.75 m (5 ft 9 in)
- Position: Forward

Youth career
- 1969–1971: Real Sociedad
- 1971–1972: Athletic Bilbao

Senior career*
Years	Team	Apps	(Gls)
1972–1977	Athletic Bilbao	0	(0)
1975–1976	Bilbao Athletic		

Managerial career
- 1978–1980: Lagun Onak
- 1980–1982: Aurrerá
- 1982–1983: Gimnàstic
- 1983–1986: Español
- 1986–1987: Real Valladolid
- 1987–1988: Sevilla
- 1990: Tenerife
- 1993–1994: Bolivia
- 1995–1996: Chile
- 1997–1998: Yokohama Marinos
- 2005: Guadalajara
- 2012–2014: Bolivia
- 2014–2015: Bolívar
- 2015–2016: Oriente Petrolero
- 2016–2017: Sport Boys
- 2020: Atlético Palmaflor
- 2023: Bolivia (assistant)
- * Club domestic league appearances and goals

Francisco Xabier Azkargorta Uriarte (26 September 1953 – 14 November 2025) was a Spanish professional football forward and manager.

== Playing career ==
Born in Azpeitia, Gipuzkoa, Azkargorta spent five years under contract to Athletic Bilbao after arriving in 1971 from neighbouring Real Sociedad and completed his development at Athletic, but failed to appear in any official games with the first team due to injury. He retired aged only 24.

== Coaching career ==
Azkargorta started working as a manager one year after retiring, his beginnings being in lower league football mainly in his native Basque Country. In August 1982, the 28-year-old was appointed at Gimnàstic de Tarragona in the Segunda División B and, the following season, moved straight into La Liga after signing for RCD Español.

After two more years in Catalonia, Azkargorta continued to coach in the top flight until 1991, being in charge of Real Valladolid, Sevilla FC and CD Tenerife. He was dismissed by the last two sides before their respective campaigns ended.

Still in the decade, Azkargorta worked with the national teams of Bolivia and Chile. He led the former to the 1994 FIFA World Cup, thus marking the first time the country reached the tournament through the qualification process. In 1997, he returned to club duties after signing with Yokohama F. Marinos, and eight years later he took charge of Mexico's C.D. Guadalajara. In between, he spent two years with Real Madrid as head of its academies in Central and South America.

In March 2006, Azkargorta was appointed director of football at Beijing Guoan F.C. in the Chinese Super League. He returned to his homeland on 14 July 2008, joining Valencia CF in the same capacity.

Azkargorta was again chosen as Bolivian national team manager on 17 July 2012, replacing Gustavo Quinteros six games into the 2014 World Cup qualifying campaign. He was relieved of his duties in March 2014, after it was revealed he had signed with Club Bolívar.

== Personal life and death ==
Azkargorta's younger brother, Juan Ignacio (born 1956), was also a footballer. He also worked as a manager at youth level.

Azkargorta died in Bolivia on 14 November 2025, at the age of 72. He had been battling heart problems for several years.

== Managerial statistics ==
Team	From	To	Record				
Team	From	To	G	W	D	L	Win %
Yokohama Marinos	1997	1998	49	34	0	15	69.39
Total			49	34	0	15	69.39
