= Vladimir Soria =

Bolivian footballer and coach (born 1964)

Personal information
- Full name: Vladimir Soria Camacho
- Date of birth: 15 July 1964 (age 62)
- Place of birth: Cochabamba, Bolivia
- Height: 1.68 m (5 ft 6 in)
- Position: Midfielder

Team information
- Current team: Bolívar (assistant)

Senior career*
Years	Team	Apps	(Gls)
1982–1984	Jorge Wilstermann		
1985–2000	Bolívar	451	(52)

International career
1989–2001	Bolivia	51	(1)

Managerial career
- 2000–2003: Bolívar
- 2002: Bolivia
- 2004–2005: Bolívar
- 2007: San José
- 2007–2008: Jorge Wilstermann
- 2008–2009: Real Potosí
- 2012–2013: Bolivia (assistant)
- 2013–2015: Bolívar (assistant)
- 2014: Bolívar (caretaker)
- 2019: Jorge Wilstermann (assistant)
- 2020: Royal Pari (assistant)
- 2020–: Bolívar (assistant)
- 2021: Bolívar (caretaker)
- 2023: Bolívar (caretaker)
- 2026: Bolívar (caretaker)
- * Club domestic league appearances and goals

Vladimir Soria Camacho (born 15 July 1964) is a Bolivian football manager and former player who played as a midfielder. He is the current assistant manager of Bolívar.

== Club career ==
Soria was born in Cochabamba. At club level, he played most of his career for Bolívar, where he won 8 national titles. He played in 451 games netting 52 goals. He also participated in 93 Copa Libertadores matches and scored 4 goals. Soria is third player with more appearances in the history of this international competition.

== National team ==
Between 1989 and 2000 Soria has earned 51 caps and one goal for the Bolivia national football team. Among the most important tournaments at international level, Soria played in the 1994 FIFA World Cup and Copa America 1997, where he was the national team's captain. His only goal came in a 1998 FIFA World Cup Qualifier on February 12, 1997, against Chile, when he opened the score in the 27th minute.

== Managerial career ==
After retiring as a player in 2000, he had a short spell as Bolívar's manager. Years later, Soria also managed Wilstermann and Real Potosí.

== Honours ==
=== Club ===
- Bolívar
  - Liga de Fútbol Profesional Boliviano: 1985, 1986, 1988, 1991, 1992, 1994, 1996, and 1997
- Bolivia
  - Copa América runner-up: 1997
