= José Luis Caminero =

Spanish footballer (born 1967)

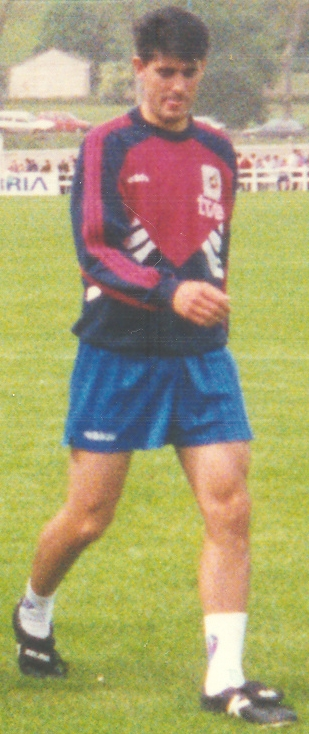
- Caminero training with Spain in 1994

Personal information
- Full name: José Luis Pérez Caminero
- Date of birth: 8 November 1967 (age 58)
- Place of birth: Madrid, Spain
- Height: 1.87 m (6 ft 2 in)
- Position: Midfielder

Youth career
- Real Madrid

Senior career*
Years	Team	Apps	(Gls)
1986–1989	Real Madrid B	39	(4)
1989–1993	Valladolid	134	(3)
1993–1998	Atlético Madrid	149	(40)
1998–2004	Valladolid	155	(15)
Total		477	(62)

International career
1993–1996	Spain	21	(8)
- * Club domestic league appearances and goals

José Luis Pérez Caminero (born 8 November 1967) is a Spanish former professional footballer who played as a midfielder.

Arguably one of the best Spanish footballers of the 1990s, he was able to play in any midfield position, in the middle or in the wings. Having appeared in 408 La Liga matches over 14 seasons (57 goals), he possessed a vast array of skills: dribble, shot and physique, and his career was almost exclusively associated with Valladolid and Atlético Madrid.

Caminero represented Spain in the 1994 World Cup and Euro 1996, scoring in both tournaments.

== Club career ==
Having unsuccessfully emerged through the ranks of Real Madrid, Madrid-born Caminero signed with Real Valladolid for the 1989–90 season, with Fernando Hierro moving in the opposite direction. He helped the side barely avoid La Liga relegation, and scored his first goal in the competition on 16 December 1990 in a 3–1 home win against Valencia CF.

The peak of Caminero's career took place from 1993–94, when he joined Atlético Madrid. He was a key member of the squad that won an historical double in 1995–96, contributing nine league goals in 37 games; accordingly, at the end of the season, he was given the Spanish Footballer of the Year award by both the Madrid newspaper El País and the prestigious football magazine Don Balón, being the only Atlético player to win both awards the same year, and netted a career-best 14 goals the following campaign.

Caminero re-joined Valladolid at age 30, ending his career in 2004 after the team's top-flight relegation. In his final years, he further enhanced his versatility by playing in the sweeper position.

Subsequently, Caminero was installed as the club's director of football. He left the position citing personal reasons after 2007–08.

Caminero returned to Atlético in May 2011. He joined Málaga CF seven years later, still in that capacity.

== International career ==
Caminero made his Spain national team debut on 8 September 1993, in a 2–0 friendly win with Chile in Alicante. He represented the country at the 1994 FIFA World Cup in the United States, where he was the nation's leading scorer at three (scoring twice against Bolivia in a 3–1 group stage victory) and also in UEFA Euro 1996 in England, where he netted a late equaliser against France.

Caminero totalled eight goals in 21 caps, and his last appearance was against England in Euro '96, a penalty shootout loss.

== Arrest ==
In June 2009, Caminero was arrested for possible connections to drug traffic operations, with a further 30 people being taken into custody for interrogation. He was released upon the reading of his rights.

== In popular culture ==
Caminero's football genius also made it to the silver screen. Spanish movie director Pedro Almodóvar included his dribbling against FC Barcelona's defender Miguel Ángel Nadal in his 1997 film Live Flesh.

== Career statistics ==
Scores and results list Spain's goal tally first, score column indicates score after each Caminero goal.

List of international goals scored by José Luis Caminero
No.	Date	Venue	Opponent	Score	Result	Competition
1	22 September 1993	Qemal Stafa, Tirana, Albania	Albania	5–1	5–1	1994 World Cup qualification
2	13 October 1993	Lansdowne Road, Dublin, Republic of Ireland	Republic of Ireland	1–0	3–1	1994 World Cup qualification
3	27 June 1994	Soldier Field, Chicago, United States	Bolivia	2–0	3–1	1994 World Cup
4	27 June 1994	Soldier Field, Chicago, United States	Bolivia	3–1	3–1	1994 World Cup
5	9 July 1994	Foxboro, Foxborough, United States	Italy	1–1	1–2	1994 World Cup
6	6 September 1995	Los Cármenes, Granada, Spain	Cyprus	6–0	6–0	Euro 1996 qualifying
7	15 November 1995	Martínez Valero, Elche, Spain	North Macedonia	3–0	3–0	Euro 1996 qualifying
8	15 June 1996	Elland Road, Leeds, England	France	1–1	1–1	UEFA Euro 1996

== Honours ==
Atlético Madrid

- La Liga: 1995–96
- Copa del Rey: 1995–96

Individual

- Don Balón Award: 1996

== See also ==
- List of Atlético Madrid players (+100)
- List of La Liga players (400+ appearances)
