= Mirco Gennari =

Sammarinese footballer

Micro Gennari
Personal information
- Date of birth: 26 March 1966 (age 60)
- Place of birth: City of San Marino, San Marino
- Position: Defender

Senior career*
Years	Team	Apps	(Gls)
1991–1993	Cosmos		
1993–1997	Juvenes		
1998–2000	Almas Ponte Rimini		
2000–2003	Juvenes/Dogana		
2002–2006	Virtus		
2005–2006	Juvenes/Dogana		
2006–2008	Faetano	13+	(0)
2008–2009	Folgore	8	(0)
2009–2010	La Fiorita	18	(0)
2010–2011	Cosmos	10	(0)
2011–2012	San Giovanni	3	(0)
2012–2014	Cosmos	2	(0)

International career
1992–2003	San Marino	48	(0)
- * Club domestic league appearances and goals

Mirco Gennari (born 29 March 1966 in City of San Marino, San Marino) is a Sammarinese former footballer who played as a defender for clubs in San Marino and Italy.

== Club career ==
He began his career with S.S. Cosmos before moving to A.C. Juvenes/Dogana in 1993. In 1998, he moved across the border to play for A.C. Rimini in Italy, before returning to San Marino to play for S.S. Virtus in 2002. He returned to Juvenes for the 2005–06 season before moving on again to S.C. Faetano. He left Faetano after two seasons in 2008, and spent his last four seasons with four clubs, including S.S. Folgore Falciano in 2008–09 and S.P. La Fiorita in 2009–10. He returned to the club where he started his career, Cosmos, for the 2010–11 season and spent his last season in football, 2011–12, with S.S. San Giovanni.

== International career ==
With 48 caps earned between 1992 and 2003, Gennari was previously the most capped player in the history of the San Marino national team before being surpassed by Andy Selva, who finished with 73.

== Sources ==
- Associazione Calciatori Over 35. Press release: Risultati del “8° TROFEO UNICEF SAN MARINO” (22 June 2009). Published on www.libertas.sm
- Rec.Sport.Soccer Statistics Foundation. Mirco Gennari - International Appearances
- Shaw, Phil. "San Marino: Collins eases Scotland's anxiety". The Independent (27 April 1995)
