= Rodrigo Badilla =

Costa Rican football referee

Rodrigo Sequeira Badilla
- Full name: Rodrigo Sequeira Badilla
- Born: 22 June 1957 (age 69); Costa Rica

Domestic
| Years | League | Role |

International
| Years | League | Role |
| 1989–2002 | FIFA listed | Referee |

Rodrigo Sequeira Badilla (born June 22, 1957) is a retired football (soccer) referee from Costa Rica, best known for supervising three matches during the 1994 FIFA World Cup held in the United States: The Group D Nigeria-Bulgaria match, the Group C Spain-Bolivia match, and the Brazil-Netherlands quarterfinal.

A former FIFA referee, he is known to have officiated in international matches during the period from 1989 to 2002. Badilla served as a referee at numerous international tournaments, including the 1992 and 1995 King Fahd Cups, the 1993 FIFA World Youth Championship, and the 1998 and 2002 World Cup qualifiers. At continental level, he took charge of matches at the 1993 and 1998 CONCACAF Gold Cups, as well as the 1997 Copa América.
