= Carlos Borja (footballer, born 1956) =

Bolivian footballer (born 1950)

Personal information
- Full name: Carlos Fernando Borja Bolívar
- Date of birth: 25 December 1956 (age 69)
- Place of birth: Cochabamba, Bolivia
- Height: 1.68 m (5 ft 6 in)
- Position: Midfielder

Youth career
- Bolívar

Senior career*
Years	Team	Apps	(Gls)
1977–1997	Bolívar	532	(129)

International career
1979–1995	Bolivia	88	(1)
- * Club domestic league appearances and goals

Carlos Fernando Borja Bolívar (born 25 December 1956) is a Bolivian former professional footballer who played as a midfielder.

== Club career ==
At club level Borja was a one club man playing his entire club career for Bolívar, where he won eleven Bolivian league titles. He played in more than 530 games, and scored 129 league goals for Bolívar making him the 3rd highest goalscorer in the history of the club. He also played in 87 Copa Libertadores games scoring 11 goals for La Academia. He is remembered as one of the most important players in the history of the club.

== International career ==
He was capped 88 times and scored one international goal for the Bolivia national team between 1979 and 1995, including three matches at the 1994 FIFA World Cup. He scored his only goal for Bolivia in a friendly match on June 23, 1987, in Montevideo against Uruguay (2–1 loss).

== Later life ==
He has become a well-known politician and has served in the management of sports for Bolivia, following his retirement. His time of politics included a house of representatives position at one point in time.

== Honours ==
Bolívar

- Bolivian League Championship (11): 1978, 1982, 1983, 1985, 1987, 1988, 1991, 1992, 1994, 1996, 1997
