= Miguel Rimba =

Bolivian footballer (born 1967)

Personal information
- Full name: Miguel Ángel Rimba Alvis
- Date of birth: November 1, 1967 (age 59)
- Place of birth: Riberalta, Bolivia
- Height: 1.78 m (5 ft 10 in)
- Position: Right-back

Senior career*
Years	Team	Apps	(Gls)
1988–1998	Bolívar	302	(4)
1998–1999	Atlético Tucumán	13	(0)
1999–2000	Oriente Petrolero	57	(0)
2001–2002	Real Santa Cruz	17	(1)
2003	Aurora	6	(0)
Total		395	(5)

International career
1989–2000	Bolivia	80	(0)
- * Club domestic league appearances and goals

Miguel Ángel Rimba Alvis (born November 1, 1967) is a Bolivian former professional footballer who played as right-back. He made 80 international appearances for the Bolivia national team.

== Career ==
Rimba was born in Riberalta. He made three appearances in the 1994 FIFA World Cup and was part of the squad that reached the final of the Copa América in 1997. He made his debut on May 25, 89 in a friendly match against Paraguay in Cochabamba.

He played the majority of his club career for Bolívar where he won six Bolivian league titles (1988, 1991, 1992, 1994, 1996, 1997).

Towards the end of his career he played in Argentina with Atlético Tucumán, he then had short spells with Oriente Petrolero, Real Santa Cruz and Aurora before his retirement in 2003.

Over the course of his career he had 63 Copa Libertadores appearances and scored a goal.

== Honours ==
Bolívar

- Liga de Fútbol Profesional Boliviano (6): 1988, 1991, 1992, 1994, 1996, 1997
