= Luis Cristaldo =

Argentine-Bolivian footballer (born 1969)

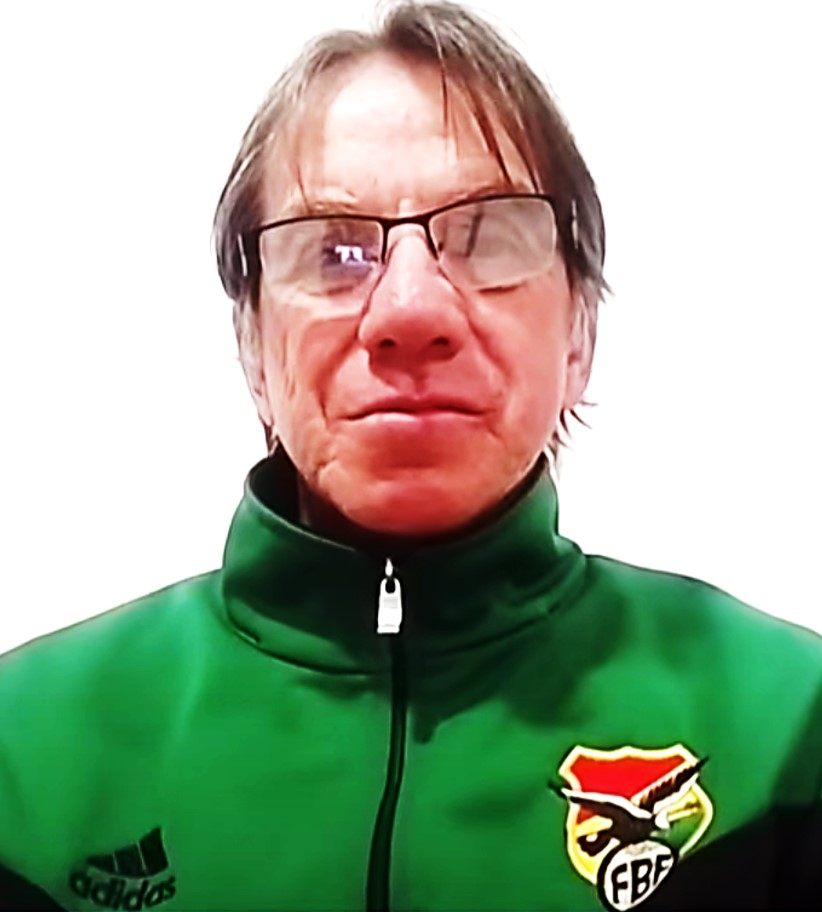
- Cristaldo in 2025

Personal information
- Full name: Luis Héctor Cristaldo Ruiz Díaz
- Date of birth: August 31, 1969 (age 57)
- Place of birth: Ibarreta, Argentina
- Height: 1.75 m (5 ft 9 in)
- Position: Midfielder

Youth career
- Tahuichi Academy

Senior career*
Years	Team	Apps	(Gls)
1988–1990	Oriente Petrolero	127	(11)
1991–1992	Cerro Porteño		(0)
1993–1998	Bolívar	12	(1)
1994	→ Deportivo Mandiyú (loan)	8	(0)
1998–1999	Sporting Gijón	0	(8)
1999–2000	Cerro Porteño	107	(0)
2001–2006	The Strongest	11	
2007–2008	Oriente Petrolero		
2009–2010	Guabirá		
2011	The Strongest		

International career
1989–2005	Bolivia	93	(5)

Managerial career
- 2012–2013: Guabirá
- * Club domestic league appearances and goals

Luis Héctor Cristaldo Ruiz Díaz (born August 31, 1969) is an Argentine-born Bolivian professional footballer who played as a midfielder.

== Club career ==
Born in Formosa, Argentina, Cristaldo relocated to Santa Cruz, Bolivia at the age of 15. He then began attending the prestigious Tahuichi football academy, and by the time he was 18 years old he made his official debut in first division. He played for Bolivian teams Oriente Petrolero (1990–1992) and Bolívar (1993–1998), winning four national titles combined during those years.

In 1998, he went abroad to play for Sporting de Gijón in Spain and later with Cerro Porteño and Sol de América in Paraguay, not to mention a previous spell he had during 1994 with Argentine club Mandiyú de Corrientes and legendary Diego Maradona as the manager.

In 2001, Cristaldo returned to Bolivia and played with The Strongest for the next six years. In 2007, during his second spell with Oriente Petrolero he called it quits, laying his football career to rest permanently after seventeen years of professional football.

== International career ==
Cristaldo played at the 1987 FIFA U-16 World Championship in Canada.

Cristaldo and Marco Sandy hold the record for the third-most appearances for the Bolivia national team with 93 international matches and 5 goals between 1989 and 2005, including two appearances in the 1994 FIFA World Cup. Cristaldo made his international debut on September 10, 1989, in a World Cup Qualifier against Uruguay in Montevideo (2–0 loss) and equalled Sandy's record in his final match against Brazil in October 2005. He represented his country in 33 FIFA World Cup qualification matches and at the 1999 FIFA Confederations Cup.

== Honours ==
Oriente Petrolero

- Liga de Fútbol Profesional Boliviano: 1990

Bolívar

- Liga de Fútbol Profesional Boliviano: 1994, 1996, 1997

The Strongest

- Liga de Fútbol Profesional Boliviano: 2003 (A), 2003 (C), 2004 (C)
