= Erwin Sánchez =

Bolivian footballer and manager (born 1969)

Personal information
- Full name: Erwin Sánchez Freking
- Date of birth: 19 October 1969 (age 57)
- Place of birth: Santa Cruz, Bolivia
- Height: 1.74 m (5 ft 8 1/2 in)
- Position: Attacking midfielder

Youth career
- 1981–1986: Tahuichi Academy

Senior career*
Years	Team	Apps	(Gls)
1987–1988	Destroyers	67	(23)
1988–1990	Bolívar	34	(13)
1990–1992	Benfica	15	(1)
1991–1992	→ Estoril (loan)	28	(8)
1992–1997	Boavista	105	(25)
1997–1999	Benfica	26	(6)
1998–1999	→ Boavista (loan)	22	(0)
1999	Benfica B	3	(3)
2000–2004	Boavista	92	(19)
2004–2005	Oriente Petrolero	38	(10)
Total		430	(108)

International career
1989–2005	Bolivia	57	(15)

Managerial career
- 2003–2004: Boavista
- 2006–2009: Bolivia
- 2012–2013: Oriente Petrolero
- 2015: Blooming
- 2015–2016: Boavista
- 2018–2020: Blooming
- 2020–2023: Oriente Petrolero
- 2026: Blooming
- * Club domestic league appearances and goals

Erwin Sánchez Freking (born 19 October 1969) is a Bolivian former footballer who played as an attacking midfielder, currently a manager.

Dubbed Platini, most of his professional career was spent in Portugal, amassing Primeira Liga totals of 288 matches and 59 goals over 13 seasons mainly in representation of Boavista and Benfica. Retiring in 2005, he subsequently became a coach.

From 2006 to 2009, Sánchez managed the Bolivia national team after having appeared as a player in the 1994 FIFA World Cup, the country's third participation.

== Club career ==
Born in Santa Cruz de la Sierra, Sánchez started his career at hometown's Club Destroyers, then moved to Club Bolívar. He was signed by S.L. Benfica for the 1990–91 season, but was not very successful there, also being loaned to Lisbon neighbours G.D. Estoril Praia.

Sánchez joined Boavista F.C. after being released in 1992, eventually becoming one of the team's best players. This prompted a 1997 return to Benfica, but the player again failed to settle, returning to the Axadrezados (chequereds) and being crucial to the club's only league conquest in 2001, with nine goals in 33 games.

After a serious anterior cruciate ligament injury, Sánchez eventually lost importance in Boavista and left the club in 2004 after a coaching spell, returning home for a final season with Oriente Petrolero and retiring as a player at the age of 36. In his last appearance, on 14 March 2005 against Club Blooming, he assaulted referee Wilson Aliaga, being suspended for 18 months.

Sánchez had another managerial spell at Boavista, as well as two each at Blooming and Oriente Petrolero.

== International career ==
Sánchez was a leading player for Bolivia, being crucial to the nation's qualification for the 1994 FIFA World Cup. The team exited the competition in the group stage, and he scored their only goal in a 3–1 loss against Spain; this was also the country's first and only goal in three appearances in World Cup tournaments.

Sánchez appeared in a total of 57 matches over 16 years, netting 15 times. He was part of their 1997 Copa América squad, playing all the matches save one for the runner-up hosts and scoring three goals, including in the final with Brazil.

In 2006, Sánchez was named national team manager, being dismissed after the unsuccessful 2010 World Cup qualifying campaign.

=== International goals ===
#	Date	Venue	Opponent	Score	Result	Competition
1.	10 September 1989	Estadio Nacional, Lima, Peru	Peru	1–2	1–2	1990 World Cup qualification
2.	9 July 1991	Estadio Sausalito, Viña del Mar, Chile	Brazil	2–1	2–1	1991 Copa América
3.	18 July 1993	Polideportivo Cachamay, Puerto Ordaz, Venezuela	Venezuela	1–1	1–7	1994 World Cup qualification
4.	18 July 1993	Polideportivo Cachamay, Puerto Ordaz, Venezuela	Venezuela	1–5	1–7	1994 World Cup qualification
5.	18 July 1993	Polideportivo Cachamay, Puerto Ordaz, Venezuela	Venezuela	1–7	1–7	1994 World Cup qualification
6.	8 August 1993	Estadio Hernando Siles, La Paz, Bolivia	Uruguay	1–0	3–1	1994 World Cup qualification
7.	22 August 1993	Estadio Hernando Siles, La Paz, Bolivia	Venezuela	3–0	7–0	1994 World Cup qualification
8.	4 May 1994	Stade Pierre de Coubertin, Cannes, France	Saudi Arabia	1–0	1–0	Friendly
9.	27 June 1994	Soldier Field, Chicago, United States	Spain	1–2	1–3	1994 FIFA World Cup
10.	25 October 1995	Estadio Ramón Tahuichi Aguilera, Santa Cruz, Bolivia	Ecuador	2–0	2–2	Friendly
11.	21 June 1997	Estadio Hernando Siles, La Paz, Bolivia	Colombia	2–0	2–1	1997 Copa América
12.	25 June 1997	Estadio Hernando Siles, La Paz, Bolivia	Mexico	1–1	3–1	1997 Copa América
13.	29 June 1997	Estadio Hernando Siles, La Paz, Bolivia	Brazil	1–1	1–3	1997 Copa América Final
14.	5 July 1999	Monumental Río Parapití, Pedro Juan Caballero, Paraguay	Japan	1–0	1–1	1999 Copa América
15.	26 April 2000	Estadio Hernando Siles, La Paz, Bolivia	Colombia	1–0	1–1	2002 World Cup qualification

== Personal life ==
Sánchez's son, also called Erwin, was also a Bolivian international midfielder.

== Honours ==
=== Player ===
Benfica

- Primeira Liga: 1990–91

Boavista

- Primeira Liga: 2000–01
- Taça de Portugal: 1996–97

Oriente Petrolero

- Copa Aerosur: 2005

=== Manager ===
Blooming

- Copa Cine Center: 2015
