= Carlos Trucco =

Bolivian football goalkeeper (born 1957)

Personal information
- Full name: Carlos Leonel Trucco Medina
- Date of birth: 11 August 1957 (age 69)
- Place of birth: Córdoba, Argentina
- Height: 1.80 m (5 ft 11 in)
- Position: Goalkeeper

Senior career*
| Years | Team | Apps | (Gls) |
| 1977–1981 | Unión de Santa Fe | 55 | (0) |
| 1981–1984 | Vélez Sársfield | 3 | (0) |
| 1984–1985 | Unión de Santa Fe | 4 | (0) |
| 1985 | Estudiantes de Río Cuarto | 9 | (0) |
| 1986–1988 | Destroyers | | |
| 1989–1990 | Oriente Petrolero | | |
| 1990–1991 | Deportivo Cali | 45 | (0) |
| 1991–1994 | Bolívar | | |
| 1994–1995 | Pachuca | | |
| 1995–1996 | Bolívar | | |
| 1996–1997 | Cruz Azul | | |

International career
| 1989–1997 | Bolivia | 51 | (0) |

Managerial career
- 2000: Veracruz
- 2001–2002: Bolivia
- 2002: Celaya
- 2003: Pachuca
- * Club domestic league appearances and goals

Carlos Leonel Trucco Medina (born 11 August 1957) is a former football goalkeeper who played 51 games for the Bolivia national team between 1989 and 1997.

Despite being born in Argentina, Trucco was the starting goalkeeper of Bolivia national football team during 1994 FIFA World Cup. He played all 3 group games and conceded 4 goals.

Trucco started his club career in Argentina where he played for Unión de Santa Fe, Vélez Sársfield and Estudiantes de Río Cuarto.

In 1985, he moved to Bolivia where he played for Club Destroyers and Bolívar.

He also played for Deportivo Cali in Colombia and Pachuca in Mexico.

After he retired from playing, Trucco became a football coach. He has managed Veracruz and San Luis in Mexico and Wilstermann in Bolivia, and was appointed manager of the Bolivia national football team in 2001.
