= Bolivia national football team =

Men's association football team

Bolivia
- Nickname: La Verde (The Green)
- Association: Federación Boliviana de Fútbol (FBF)
- Confederation: CONMEBOL (South America)
- Head coach: Óscar Villegas
- Captain: Luis Haquín
- Most caps: Marcelo Moreno (108)
- Top scorer: Marcelo Moreno (31)
- Home stadium: Estadio Municipal de El Alto
- FIFA code: BOL
First colours	Second colours

FIFA ranking
- Current: 79 ▼1 (18 November 2026)
- Highest: 18 (July 1997)
- Lowest: 115 (October 2011)

First international
- Chile 7–1 Bolivia (Santiago, Chile; 12 October 1926)

Biggest win
- Bolivia 7–0 Venezuela (La Paz, Bolivia; 22 August 1993); Bolivia 9–2 Haiti (La Paz, Bolivia; 3 March 2000)

Biggest defeat
- Uruguay 9–0 Bolivia (Lima, Peru; 6 November 1927); Brazil 10–1 Bolivia (São Paulo, Brazil; 10 April 1949)

World Cup
- Appearances: 3 (first in 1930, last in 1994)
- Best result: Group stage (1930, 1950, 1994)

Copa América
- Appearances: 29 (first in 1926)
- Best result: Champions (1963)

Confederations Cup
- Appearances: 1 (first in 1999)
- Best result: Group stage (1999)
Medal record
Copa América
Gold medal – first place	1963 Bolivia	Team
Silver medal – second place	1997 Bolivia	Team

The Bolivia national football team (Spanish: Selección de fútbol de Bolivia), nicknamed La Verde, has represented Bolivia in men's international football since 1926. Organized by the Federación Boliviana de Fútbol (lit. 'Bolivian Football Federation'), (Note: The acronym FBF comes from the organization's Spanish name, Federación Boliviana de Fútbol.) it is one of the ten members of FIFA's South American Football Confederation (CONMEBOL).

After playing in the 1930 and 1950 World Cups, they have qualified just once, in 1994, where they were eliminated in the group stage. Bolivia have never advanced past the first round of any World Cup, and have only scored one goal, in 1994. Despite their World Cup performances, Bolivia won the Copa América at home in 1963, and finished runners-up in 1997, which they also hosted. At the 2015 Copa América in Chile, they advanced to the quarter-finals for the first time since 1997, after defeating Ecuador 3–2. This also ended a winless streak in the Copa América, with their last victory being on 28 June 1997, when they defeated Mexico 1–0 in the semi-finals.

== History ==
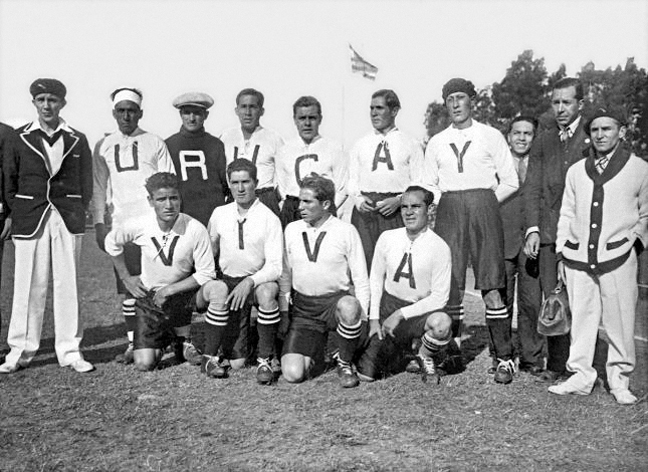
Bolivia national team at the 1930 FIFA World Cup before their match against Yugoslavia

Bolivia debuted in international football in 1926, one year after the Bolivian Football Federation was founded, and joined FIFA that same year. As participants at the 1926 South American Championship in Chile, Bolivia played their first match against the hosts on 12 October 1926, and even ended up scoring first against them, but wound up being defeated by the Chileans 7–1. Bolivia also lost their following three matches: 0–5 against Argentina, 1–6 against Paraguay and 0–6 against Uruguay.

In 1930, Bolivia was one of the teams invited to the inaugural edition of the World Cup, held in Uruguay. Drawn in Group 2 of the 1930 World Cup, Bolivia lost both its games 4–0, first against Yugoslavia at the Estadio Parque Central, then Brazil in the Estadio Centenario. The match against the Yugoslavs would be the last match against a non-South American opponent for Bolivia until 1972 – when they again met Yugoslavia. They returned for the 1950 World Cup, where Argentina's withdrawal from the qualifiers gave Bolivia an automatic berth. With three teams declining to play in Brazil, Bolivia was put in a group of two along with Uruguay. The Bolivians' only game was an 8–0 defeat to Uruguay at the Estádio Independência in Belo Horizonte.

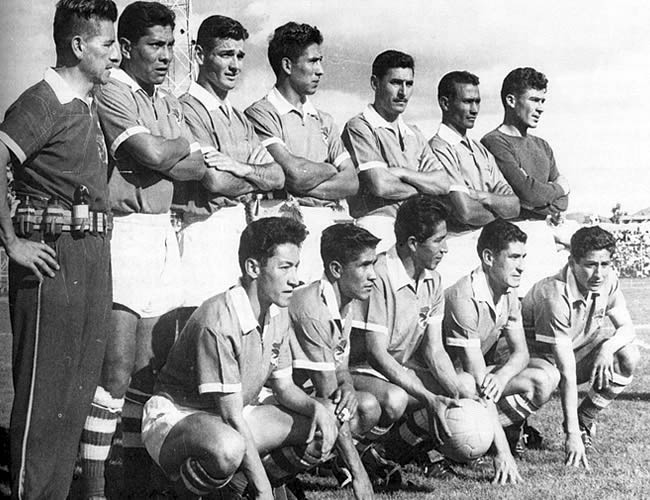
The Bolivian squad that won its first and only Copa América title in 1963

Bolivia's greatest football achievement was the 1963 South American Championship title, which they hosted and won after placing first out of 7 countries, including being undefeated, with five wins and one draw. The only draw for Bolivia in the tournament was a 4–4 draw against Ecuador in the opening match. They also had the advantage of being better accustomed to higher altitudes. In the following edition, the 1967 South American Championship, held in Uruguay, Bolivia finished last out of six teams, with one draw and four losses, which was far below what the public expected, as Bolivia had been the defending champion.

Afterwards, the country only started to resurge at an international level with the creation of the Academia Tahuichi Aguilera in Santa Cruz de la Sierra in 1978, a football school that developed players such as Marco Etcheverry, Erwin Sánchez and Luis Cristaldo.

Under Spanish coach Xabier Azkargorta and featuring nine players from Tahuichi, Bolivia surprisingly became the first team to beat Brazil in the 1994 World Cup qualifiers while playing them in La Paz, with a 2–0 win, and qualified for the 1994 World Cup by finishing second in Group B behind the Brazilians themselves, which included record 7–0 and 7–1 wins over Venezuela during their qualification campaign.

Bolivia was drawn into the tournament's Group C, and played defending champions Germany in the tournament's opening match at Soldier Field. Bolivia outplayed Germany in the first half. In the second half, Lothar Matthäus took a 40-yard run and struck Marco "El Diablo" Etcheverry with a high elbow to his jaw. Etcheverry retaliated by fouling Matthäus and was sent off. Eventually, Bolivia lost on a controversial offside goal by Jürgen Klinsmann. Following a goalless draw with South Korea at Foxboro Stadium, where Bolivia was forced to play with ten men again after Cristaldo's red card, Bolivia returned to Chicago and lost 3–1 against Spain, with Sánchez scoring the first ever Bolivian goal in a World Cup.

Following the World Cup, Bolivia participated in the 1995 Copa América held in Uruguay, with Antonio Lopez Habas as manager, where they made the quarter-finals for the first time since winning the competition in 1963, with one win, one draw, and one loss. In the quarter-finals, the nation lost to hosts Uruguay 2–1. Despite the decent performance the team displayed during the tournament, Lopez Habas left his post after the 1997 Copa America, being replaced by Dušan Drašković. The 1997 edition was the second time Bolivia held the tournament. The team reached the final, as had happened last time Bolivia was the host, but this time they finished runner-up to reigning world champion Brazil after losing 3–1 in the final.

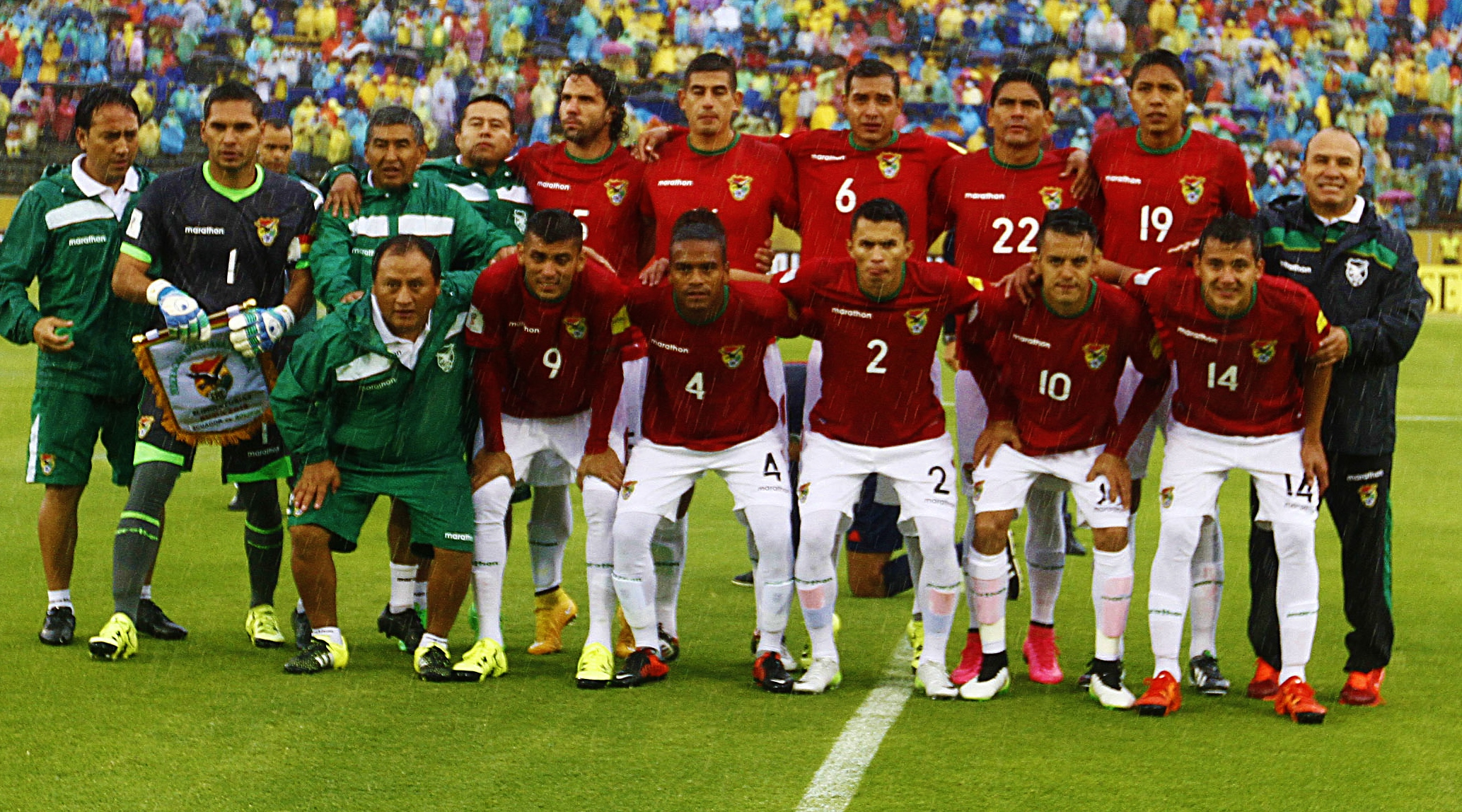
Bolivia before a match against Ecuador during the 2018 World Cup qualifiers

With their runner-up finish at the previous Copa America, Bolivia made their first and only FIFA Confederations Cup appearance in the 1999 edition, this time under new Argentine manager Héctor Veira. Bolivia was placed in group A along with hosts Mexico, Saudi Arabia, and Egypt. Their campaign started with a 2–2 draw against Egypt. Their next match was a goalless draw against Saudi Arabia. For their last match in the group, they had to play hosts Mexico, in which Bolivia lost 0–1 with a goal from Francisco Palencia. Bolivia finished third in the group with two draws and a loss, being eliminated from the tournament in the first stage.

In the 2015 Copa América in Chile, under Bolivian manager Mauricio Soria, Bolivia were placed in Group A, with Chile, Mexico, and Ecuador. In their match against Mexico, Bolivia drew goalless. However, against Ecuador, Bolivia won 3–2, with goals from Raldes, Smedberg-Dalence, and Moreno. From this victory against Ecuador, Bolivia made it to the next round, the quarter-finals, for the first time since the 1997 tournament, which they hosted. Bolivia was defeated by Peru 1–3 in the quarter-finals of the tournament, and Bolivia's only goal of the game was a penalty in the last minutes of the match scored by Marcelo Moreno. In the next three Copa América editions, Bolivia performed poorly, losing all games in these tournaments.

In 2021, newly appointed president of Bolivian Football Federation, Fernando Costa Sarmiento, lamented the deteriorating condition of football in Bolivia and vowed to rebuild the country's football system. He accused the previous Presidents of mismanaging football as he aimed to reconstruct Bolivian football into a more professional manner.

== Stadium ==
Bolivia played their home matches at Estadio Hernando Siles, which has an altitude of 3,637 metres (11,932 ft) above sea level, making it one of the highest football stadiums in the world. Many visiting teams have protested that the altitude gives Bolivia an unfair advantage against opponents. On 27 May 2007, FIFA declared that no World Cup Qualifying matches could be played in stadiums above 8,200 feet (2,500 m) above sea level. However, FIFA raised the altitude limit to 3,000 meters a month later after negative feedback against the ban, and included a special exception for La Paz, thus allowing the stadium to continue holding World Cup qualifying matches. A year after the original ban, in May 2008, FIFA removed the altitude limit entirely. In 2024 the Bolivian Football Federation decided that from then on the home games would be played in the Estadio Municipal de El Alto, that has an altitude of 4,150 metres (13,620 ft) above sea level. The official reasoning by the coach is that it was freshly renovated and that they would play where they live.

== Team image ==
=== Kit history ===
Bolivia's first uniforms were all white. In the 1930 FIFA World Cup, before the match with Yugoslavia, Bolivia painted one of the letters in "Viva Uruguay" in each of the eleven starters' jerseys to please the local crowd. In the following game with Brazil, given the adversary also wore white, Bolivia instead borrowed Uruguay's own blue uniform to play. Bolivia again painted a message to the hosts in the 1945 South American Championship, with the players' jerseys reading "Viva Chile". In 1946, Bolivia changed their jersey colors to black and white stripes, like the colors of the Cochabamba region. FBF reverted to white the following year. In 1957, FBF decided to use the colors of the Flag of Bolivia. Given that red and yellow were used by many of the other South American national teams, green became the primary color, leading to the nickname "La Verde" ("The Green").

=== Kit sponsorship ===
Kit supplier	Period
(Brazil) Penalty	1977–1979
(West Germany) Adidas	1980–1982
(Brazil) Penalty	1983–1986
(West Germany) Adidas	1987–1988
(Bolivia) El Palacio de las Gorras	1989–1990
(Germany) Adidas	1991–1992
(England) Umbro	1993–1999
(Mexico) Atletica	2000–2005
(Ecuador) Marathon	2006–2010
(Peru) Walon	2011–2014
(Ecuador) Marathon	2015–present

== Results and fixtures ==
The following is a list of match results in the last 12 months, as well as any future matches that have been scheduled.

Win Draw Loss Fixture

=== 2025 ===
21 December Unofficial friendly	Peru	2–0	Bolivia	Chincha Alta, Peru
15:30 UTC−5	Magallanes 87'; Soyer 90+1'	Report		Stadium: Estadio Félix Castillo Tardío; Referee: Roberto Pérez (Peru)
Note: The match was organized and contested by a team from SAFAP, an organization separate from the Peruvian Football Federation.

=== 2026 ===
18 January Friendly	Bolivia	1–1	Panama	Tarija, Bolivia
17:00 UTC−4	Roberts 69' (o.g.)	Report	Barría 5'	Stadium: Estadio IV Centenario; Attendance: 12,000; Referee: Bruno Arleu de Araújo (Brazil)

25 January Friendly	Bolivia	0–1	Mexico	Santa Cruz, Bolivia
15:30 UTC−4	Matheus (red card) 84'	Report	Berterame 68'	Stadium: Estadio Ramón Tahuichi Aguilera; Attendance: 24,000; Referee: Carlos Betancur (Colombia)

15 March Friendly	Bolivia	3–0	Trinidad and Tobago	Santa Cruz, Bolivia
16:00 UTC−4	Haquín 23'; Godoy 38'; Nava 51'	Report		Stadium: Estadio Ramón Tahuichi Aguilera; Attendance: 15,000; Referee: Guillermo Guerrero (Ecuador)

26 March 2026 FIFA World Cup inter-confederation play-offs	Bolivia	2–1	Suriname	Monterrey, Mexico
16:00 UTC−6	Paniagua 72'; Terceros 79' (pen.)	Report	van Gelderen 48'	Stadium: Estadio BBVA; Attendance: 33,547; Referee: Alireza Faghani (Australia)

31 March 2026 FIFA World Cup inter-confederation play-offs	Iraq	2–1	Bolivia	Monterrey, Mexico
21:00 UTC−6	Al-Hamadi 10'; Hussein 53'	Report	Paniagua 38'	Stadium: Estadio BBVA; Attendance: 49,286; Referee: Iván Barton (El Salvador)

6 June Friendly	Bolivia	0–4	Scotland	Harrison, United States
13:00 UTC−4		Report	Shankland 5'; McTominay 23'; Adams 30', 45'	Stadium: Sports Illustrated Stadium; Referee: Rosendo Mendoza (United States)

10 June Friendly	Bolivia	0–4	Algeria	Lawrence, United States
19:00 UTC−5		Report	Mandi 45'; Gouiri 56', 58'; Hadj Moussa 61'	Stadium: Rock Chalk Park; Referee: Tori Penso (United States)

27 September Friendly	Bolivia	0–2	Paraguay	Washington, D.C., United States
16:30 UTC−4		Report	Almirón 17', 50'	Stadium: Audi Field; Referee: Rosendo Mendoza (United States)

30 September Friendly	Argentina	4–0	Bolivia	Córdoba, Argentina
21:00 UTC−3	La. Martínez 19'; Paz 29'; Romero 54'; J. López 86'	Report		Stadium: Estadio Mario Alberto Kempes; Attendance: 28,500; Referee: Jhon Ospina (Colombia)

4 October Friendly	Bolivia	Cancelled	Gambia	Santa Cruz, Bolivia
18:30 UTC−4		Report		Stadium: Estadio Ramón Tahuichi Aguilera
Note: The match was cancelled due to Gambia withdrawing, due to logistical challenges and FIFA compliance issues.

13 November Friendly	Peru	2–0	Bolivia	Lima, Peru
20:00 UTC−5	Lapadula 13' (pen.); Castro 87'	Report		Stadium: Estadio Alejandro Villanueva; Referee: Carlos Betancur (Colombia)

17 November Friendly	Ecuador	2–0	Bolivia	Guayaquil, Ecuador
18:30 UTC−5	Mercado 20'; J. Caicedo 45+4'	Report		Stadium: Estadio Monumental Banco Pichincha; Referee: Kevin Ortega (Peru)

== Coaching staff ==
As of 4 September 2024

Role	Name
Head coach	(Bolivia) Óscar Villegas
Assistant coach	(Bolivia) Horacio Pacheco (Bolivia) Gabriel Ramírez (Bolivia) Cristian Farah
Goalkeeper coach	(Bolivia) Gustavo Gois de Lira
Fitness coach	(Argentina) Maximiliano Alonso
Fitness coach	(Argentina) Pablo Sciacia

=== Coaching history ===
Caretaker managers are listed in italics.

- (Bolivia) Jose de la Cerda (1926)
- (Bolivia) Jorge Valderrama (1927–1929)
- (Bolivia) Ulises Saucedo (1930–1937)
- (Bolivia) Julio Borelli (1938–1945)
- (Bolivia) Diógenes Lara (1945–1947)
- (Bolivia) Félix Deheza (1948–1950)
- (Italy) Mario Pretto (1950–1952)
- (Argentina) César Viccino (1953–1958)
- (Bolivia) Vicente Arraya (1959)
- (Brazil) Danilo Alvim (1960–1965)
- (Bolivia) Freddy Valda (1965)
- (Greece) Dan Georgiadis (1966–1967)
- (Bolivia) Freddy Valda (1969)
- (Bolivia) Freddy Valda (1973)
- (West Germany) Rudi Gutendorf (1974)
- (Bolivia) Freddy Valda (1975)
- (Bolivia) Ramiro Blacut (1979–1981)
- (Chile) Raúl Pino (1985)
- (Bolivia) Ramiro Blacut (1985–1987)
- (Argentina) Jorge Habegger (1988–1990)
- (Bolivia) Ramiro Blacut (1991–1992)
- (Spain) Xabier Azkargorta (1993–1994)
- (Spain) Antonio López Habas (1995–1997)
- (Serbia and Montenegro) Dušan Drašković (1997–1998)
- (Argentina) Héctor Veira (1998–2000)
- (Bolivia) Carlos Aragonés (2000–2001)
- (Argentina) Jorge Habegger (2001)
- (Bolivia) (Argentina) Carlos Trucco (2001–2002)
- (Argentina) Dalcio Giovagnoli (2003)
- (Uruguay) (Chile) Nelson Acosta (2003–2004)
- (Bolivia) Ramiro Blacut (2004–2005)
- (Bolivia) Ovidio Messa (2005)
- (Bolivia) Erwin Sánchez (2006–2009)
- (Bolivia) Eduardo Villegas (2009)
- (Bolivia) (Argentina) Gustavo Quinteros (2010–2012)
- (Spain) Xabier Azkargorta (2012–2014)
- (Bolivia) Mauricio Soria (2014)
- (Argentina) Néstor Clausen (2014)
- (Bolivia) Mauricio Soria (2015)
- (Bolivia) Julio César Baldivieso (2015–2016)
- (Argentina) Ángel Guillermo Hoyos (2016)
- (Bolivia) Mauricio Soria (2016–2018)
- (Venezuela) César Farías (2018)
- (Venezuela) Daniel Farías (2018)
- (Bolivia) Eduardo Villegas (2019)
- (Venezuela) César Farías (2019–2022)
- (Bolivia) (Paraguay) Pablo Escobar (2022)
- (Argentina) Gustavo Costas (2022–2023)
- (Brazil) Antônio Carlos Zago (2023–2024)
- (Bolivia) Óscar Villegas (2024–present)

== Players ==
=== Current squad ===
The following players were called up to the squad for the friendly matches against Peru and Ecuador on 13 and 17 November 2026, respectively.
Caps and goals updated as of 17 November 2026, after the match against Ecuador.

No.	Pos.	Player	Date of birth (age)	Caps	Goals	Club
1	GK	Carlos Lampe	17 March 1987 (age 39)	67	0	(Bolivian Football Federation) Bolívar
12	GK	Gerónimo Govea	10 April 2008 (age 18)	2	0	(Uruguayan Football Association) Montevideo Wanderers
23	GK	Rodrigo Banegas	8 November 1995 (age 31)	0	0	(Bolivian Football Federation) The Strongest
2	DF	Diego Arroyo	29 April 2005 (age 21)	10	0	(Israel Football Association) Hapoel Petah Tikva
3	DF	Fabricio Quaglio	30 July 2003 (age 23)	1	0	(Bolivian Football Federation) The Strongest
4	DF	Fernando Mena	22 September 2008 (age 18)	0	0	(Bolivian Football Federation) Bolívar
5	DF	Efrain Morales	4 March 2004 (age 22)	15	0	(Canadian Soccer Association) CF Montréal
17	DF	Roberto Fernández	12 July 1999 (age 27)	59	1	(Russian Football Union) Akron Tolyatti
19	DF	Joaquín Barro	9 March 2001 (age 25)	0	0	(Bolivian Football Federation) Guabirá
21	DF	Yomar Rocha	21 June 2003 (age 23)	19	0	(Russian Football Union) Akron Tolyatti
22	DF	Marco Velasco	24 July 2007 (age 19)	0	0	(Bolivian Football Federation) Oriente Petrolero
6	MF	Héctor Cuéllar	16 August 2000 (age 26)	30	0	(Bulgarian Football Union) CSKA 1948
7	MF	Miguel Terceros	25 April 2004 (age 22)	38	9	(Brazilian Football Confederation) Santos
10	MF	Ramiro Vaca	1 July 1999 (age 27)	51	5	(United Arab Emirates Football Association) Khor Fakkan
15	MF	Jorge Lovera	18 April 1997 (age 29)	2	0	(Bolivian Football Federation) Oriente Petrolero
16	MF	Óscar López	13 August 2006 (age 20)	8	0	(Royal Spanish Football Federation) Getafe B
20	MF	Carlos Melgar	4 November 1994 (age 32)	13	0	(Bolivian Football Federation) Bolívar
24	MF	Anderson Ayhuana	30 January 2006 (age 20)	0	0	(Bolivian Football Federation) Bolívar
8	FW	Leonardo Viviani	21 September 2007 (age 19)	3	0	(Bolivian Football Federation) Aurora
9	FW	José Flores	3 August 2003 (age 23)	4	0	(Bolivian Football Federation) Oriente Petrolero
11	FW	Nabil Nacif	19 September 2009 (age 17)	3	0	(Bolivian Football Federation) Oriente Petrolero
13	FW	Moisés Paniagua	16 August 2007 (age 19)	11	2	(Royal Moroccan Football Federation) Wydad Casablanca
18	FW	Guilmar Centella	26 March 2005 (age 21)	4	0	(Bolivian Football Federation) Blooming

=== Recent call-ups ===
The following players have been called up during the last twelve months.

Pos.	Player	Date of birth (age)	Caps	Goals	Club	Latest call-up
GK	Guillermo Viscarra	7 February 1993 (age 33)	40	0	Unattached	v. Argentina, 30 September 2026
GK	Bruno Poveda	22 October 2003 (age 23)	0	0	(Bolivia) Universitario de Vinto	v. Mexico, 25 January 2026
GK	Fabián Borda	11 March 2009 (age 17)	0	0	(Argentina) Atlético Tucumán II	v. Peru, 21 December 2025
DF	Richet Gómez	3 November 1998 (age 28)	5	0	(Bolivia) Always Ready	v. Peru, 13 November 2026 ^{INJ}
DF	Luis Haquín (captain)	15 November 1997 (age 29)	55	2	(United Arab Emirates) Khor Fakkan	v. Argentina, 30 September 2026
DF	Diego Medina	13 January 2002 (age 24)	35	0	(Bulgaria) CSKA 1948	v. Argentina, 30 September 2026
DF	Marcelo Torrez	8 July 2006 (age 20)	9	0	(Brazil) Santos U20	v. Argentina, 30 September 2026
DF	Damián Medina	2 October 2005 (age 21)	0	0	(Bolivia) Always Ready	v. Argentina, 30 September 2026
DF	Lucas Macazaga	16 August 2006 (age 20)	7	0	(Spain) Ponferradina	v. Algeria, 10 June 2026
DF	Leonardo Zabala	23 May 2002 (age 24)	6	0	(Bolivia) Bolívar	v. Algeria, 10 June 2026
DF	Dieguito Rodríguez	11 September 2003 (age 23)	0	0	(Bolivia) Oriente Petrolero	v. Scotland, 6 June 2026 ^{WD}
DF	Ian Rodríguez	22 January 2009 (age 17)	0	0	(Bolivia) San Antonio Bulo Bulo	v. Trinidad and Tobago, 15 March 2026
DF	Luis Paz	9 June 2004 (age 22)	6	0	(Bolivia) Bolívar	v. Mexico, 25 January 2026
DF	Leonardo Justiniano	20 July 2001 (age 25)	1	0	(Thailand) Rayong	v. Mexico, 25 January 2026
DF	Escleizon Freita	25 January 2007 (age 19)	0	0	(Bolivia) Bolívar	v. Mexico, 25 January 2026
DF	Nicolás Villarroel	17 September 2007 (age 19)	0	0	(Bolivia) Always Ready	v. Mexico, 25 January 2026
DF	Marcelo Timorán	8 July 2006 (age 20)	2	0	(Spain) Córdoba B	v. Peru, 21 December 2025
DF	Widen Saucedo	1 March 1997 (age 29)	1	0	(Bolivia) The Strongest	v. Peru, 21 December 2025
MF	Robson Tomé	18 May 2002 (age 24)	26	1	(Bolivia) Bolívar	v. Ecuador, 17 November 2026 ^{INJ}
MF	Jesús Maraude	2 February 2008 (age 18)	4	0	(Bolivia) Always Ready	v. Peru, 13 November 2026 ^{INJ}
MF	Gabriel Villamíl	28 June 2001 (age 25)	40	0	(Ecuador) LDU Quito	v. Argentina, 30 September 2026
MF	Rai Lima	8 April 2000 (age 26)	1	0	(Bolivia) Always Ready	v. Argentina, 30 September 2026
MF	Ervin Vaca	18 March 2004 (age 22)	16	1	(Bolivia) Bolívar	v. Algeria, 10 June 2026
MF	Moisés Villarroel	7 September 1998 (age 28)	35	1	(Bolivia) Blooming	v. Scotland, 6 June 2026 ^{WD}
MF	Matías Collazo	16 February 2009 (age 17)	0	0	(Bolivia) Always Ready	v. Trinidad and Tobago, 15 March 2026
MF	Julio Herrera	11 February 1999 (age 27)	1	0	(Bolivia) Oriente Petrolero	v. Mexico, 25 January 2026
MF	Adalid Terrazas	25 August 2000 (age 26)	6	0	(Bolivia) San Antonio Bulo Bulo	v. Peru, 21 December 2025
MF	Carlos Sejas	10 January 2004 (age 22)	2	0	(Bolivia) Bolívar	v. Peru, 21 December 2025
MF	Darío Torrico	18 October 2000 (age 26)	1	0	(Bolivia) Always Ready	v. Peru, 21 December 2025
MF	Santiago Arce	30 May 2000 (age 26)	0	0	(Bolivia) The Strongest	v. Peru, 21 December 2025
FW	Jhon Velásquez	22 April 2003 (age 23)	1	0	(Bolivia) Bolívar	v. Peru, 13 November 2026 ^{INJ}
FW	Fernando Nava	8 June 2004 (age 22)	9	1	(Portugal) Nacional	v. Argentina, 30 September 2026
FW	José Martines	18 September 2002 (age 24)	5	0	(Bulgaria) CSKA 1948	v. Argentina, 30 September 2026
FW	Daniel Ribera	18 February 2005 (age 21)	1	0	(Argentina) Talleres II	v. Algeria, 10 June 2026
FW	Víctor Ábrego	11 February 1997 (age 29)	18	2	(Bolivia) Guabirá	v. Iraq, 1 April 2026
FW	Enzo Monteiro	27 May 2004 (age 22)	13	2	(South Korea) Chungbuk Cheongju	v. Iraq, 1 April 2026
FW	Juan Godoy	23 June 1993 (age 33)	4	1	(Bolivia) Always Ready	v. Iraq, 1 April 2026
FW	Bruno Miranda	10 February 1998 (age 28)	22	3	(Bolivia) Bolívar	v. Mexico, 25 January 2026
FW	Lucas Chávez	17 April 2003 (age 23)	15	0	(Bolivia) Bolívar	v. Mexico, 25 January 2026
FW	William Álvarez	15 September 1995 (age 31)	2	0	(Bolivia) Nacional Potosí	v. Mexico, 25 January 2026
FW	Máximo Mamani	22 April 2005 (age 21)	2	0	(Bolivia) Oriente Petrolero	v. Mexico, 25 January 2026
FW	Gustavo Peredo	7 April 2000 (age 26)	1	0	(Bolivia) Guabirá	v. Peru, 21 December 2025
FW	John García	13 April 2000 (age 26)	7	0	(Bolivia) Bolívar	v. Peru, 21 December 2025 ^{WD}
^{INJ} Withdrew from the squad due to injury.^{PRE} Preliminary squad / standby.^{SUS} Withdrew from the squad due to suspension.^{WD} Withdrew from the squad for non-injury related reasons

== Player records ==
As of 21 November 2023
Players in bold are still active with Bolivia.

=== Most appearances ===
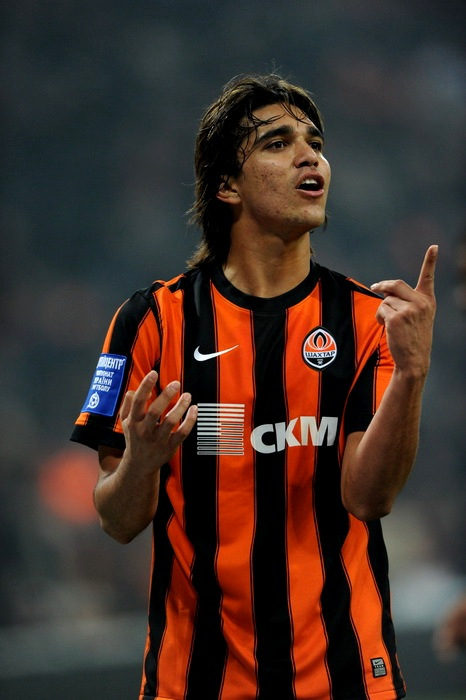
Marcelo Moreno is Bolivia's most-capped player with 108 caps and all-time top scorer with 31 goals.

Rank	Player	Caps	Goals	Career
1	Marcelo Moreno	108	31	2007–2023
2	Ronald Raldes	102	3	2001–2018
3	Luis Cristaldo	93	5	1989–2005
3	Marco Sandy	93	6	1993–2003
5	José Milton Melgar	89	6	1980–1997
6	Juan Carlos Arce	88	15	2004–2022
6	Carlos Borja	88	1	1979–1995
8	Julio César Baldivieso	85	15	1991–2005
8	Juan Manuel Peña	85	1	1991–2009
10	Miguel Rimba	80	0	1989–2000

=== Most goals ===
Rank	Player	Goals	Caps	Ratio	Career
1	Marcelo Moreno	31	108	0.29	2007–2023
2	Joaquín Botero	20	48	0.42	1999–2009
3	Victor Ugarte	16	45	0.36	1947–1963
4	Carlos Aragonés	15	31	0.48	1977–1981
4	Erwin Sánchez	15	57	0.26	1989–2005
4	Julio César Baldivieso	15	85	0.18	1991–2005
4	Juan Carlos Arce	15	88	0.17	2004–2022
8	Máximo Alcócer	13	22	0.59	1953–1963
8	Marco Etcheverry	13	71	0.18	1989–2003
10	Miguel Aguilar	10	34	0.29	1977–1983

== Competitive record ==
=== FIFA World Cup ===
FIFA World Cup record										Qualification record					
Year	Round	Position	Pld	W	D	L	GF	GA	Squad	Pld	W	D	L	GF	GA
(Uruguay) 1930	Group stage	12th	2	0	0	2	0	8	Squad	Qualified as invitees					
(Italy) 1934	Did not enter									Declined participation					
(France) 1938	Did not enter									Declined participation					
(Brazil) 1950	Group stage	13th	1	0	0	1	0	8	Squad	Qualified automatically					
(Switzerland) 1954	Did not enter									Declined participation					
(Sweden) 1958	Did not qualify									4	2	0	2	6	6
(Chile) 1962	Did not qualify									2	0	1	1	2	3
(England) 1966	Did not qualify									4	1	0	3	4	9
(Mexico) 1970	Did not qualify									4	2	0	2	5	6
(West Germany) 1974	Did not qualify									4	0	0	4	1	11
(Argentina) 1978	Did not qualify									8	3	1	4	10	25
(Spain) 1982	Did not qualify									4	1	0	3	5	6
(Mexico) 1986	Did not qualify									4	0	2	2	2	7
(Italy) 1990	Did not qualify									4	3	0	1	6	5
(United States) 1994	Group stage	21st	3	0	1	2	1	4	Squad	8	5	1	2	22	11
(France) 1998	Did not qualify									16	4	5	7	18	21
(South Korea) (Japan) 2002	Did not qualify									18	4	6	8	21	33
(Germany) 2006	Did not qualify									18	4	2	12	20	37
(South Africa) 2010	Did not qualify									18	4	3	11	22	36
(Brazil) 2014	Did not qualify									16	2	6	8	17	30
(Russia) 2018	Did not qualify									18	4	2	12	16	38
(Qatar) 2022	Did not qualify									18	4	3	11	23	42
(Canada) (Mexico) (United States) 2026	Did not qualify									20	7	2	11	20	38
(Morocco) (Portugal) (Spain) 2030	To be determined									To be determined					
(Saudi Arabia) 2034	To be determined									To be determined					
Total	Group stage	3/23	6	0	1	5	1	20	—	188	50	34	104	220	364

FIFA World Cup record
Year	Round	Score	Result
1930	Group stage	Bolivia 0–4 Yugoslavia	Loss
1930	Group stage	Bolivia 0–4 Brazil	Loss
1950	First round	Bolivia 0–8 Uruguay	Loss
1994	Group stage	Bolivia 0–1 Germany	Loss
1994	Group stage	Bolivia 0–0 South Korea	Draw
1994	Group stage	Bolivia 1–3 Spain	Loss

=== Copa América ===
Champions Runners-up Third place Fourth place

South American Championship / Copa América record
Year	Round	Position	Pld	W	D	L	GF	GA	Squad
(Argentina) 1916	No national representative								
(Uruguay) 1917	No national representative								
(Brazil) 1919	No national representative								
(Chile) 1920	No national representative								
(Argentina) 1921	No national representative								
(Brazil) 1922	No national representative								
(Uruguay) 1923	No national representative								
(Uruguay) 1924	No national representative								
(Argentina) 1925	Not a CONMEBOL member								
(Chile) 1926	Fifth place	5th	4	0	0	4	2	24	Squad
(Peru) 1927	Fourth place	4th	3	0	0	3	3	19	Squad
(Argentina) 1929	Did not participate								
(Peru) 1935	Did not participate								
(Argentina) 1937	Did not participate								
(Peru) 1939	Did not participate								
(Chile) 1941	Did not participate								
(Uruguay) 1942	Did not participate								
(Chile) 1945	Sixth place	6th	6	0	2	4	3	16	Squad
(Argentina) 1946	Sixth place	6th	5	0	0	5	4	23	Squad
(Ecuador) 1947	Seventh place	7th	7	0	2	5	6	21	Squad
(Brazil) 1949	Fourth place	4th	7	4	0	3	13	24	Squad
(Peru) 1953	Sixth place	6th	6	1	1	4	6	15	Squad
(Chile) 1955	Did not participate								
(Uruguay) 1956	Did not participate								
(Peru) 1957	Did not participate								
(Argentina) 1959	Seventh place	7th	6	0	1	5	4	23	Squad
(Ecuador) 1959	Withdrew								
(Bolivia) 1963	Champions	1st	6	5	1	0	19	13	Squad
(Uruguay) 1967	Sixth place	6th	5	0	1	4	0	9	Squad
1975	Group stage	8th	4	1	0	3	3	9	Squad
1979	Group stage	6th	4	2	0	2	4	7	Squad
1983	Group stage	8th	4	0	2	2	4	6	Squad
(Argentina) 1987	Group stage	7th	2	0	1	1	0	2	Squad
(Brazil) 1989	Group stage	9th	4	0	2	2	0	8	Squad
(Chile) 1991	Group stage	9th	4	0	2	2	2	7	Squad
(Ecuador) 1993	Group stage	10th	3	0	2	1	1	2	Squad
(Uruguay) 1995	Quarter-finals	8th	4	1	1	2	5	6	Squad
(Bolivia) 1997	Runners-up	2nd	6	5	0	1	10	5	Squad
(Paraguay) 1999	Group stage	9th	3	0	2	1	1	2	Squad
(Colombia) 2001	Group stage	11th	3	0	0	3	0	7	Squad
(Peru) 2004	Group stage	9th	3	0	2	1	3	4	Squad
(Venezuela) 2007	Group stage	10th	3	0	2	1	4	5	Squad
(Argentina) 2011	Group stage	12th	3	0	1	2	1	5	Squad
(Chile) 2015	Quarter-finals	8th	4	1	1	2	4	10	Squad
(United States) 2016	Group stage	14th	3	0	0	3	2	7	Squad
(Brazil) 2019	Group stage	12th	3	0	0	3	2	9	Squad
(Brazil) 2021	Group stage	10th	4	0	0	4	2	10	Squad
(United States) 2024	Group stage	16th	3	0	0	3	1	10	Squad
Total	1 Title	29/48	122	20	26	76	109	308	

=== FIFA Confederations Cup ===
FIFA Confederations Cup record
Year	Round	Position	Pld	W	D	L	GF	GA	Squad
(Saudi Arabia) 1992	Did not qualify								
(Saudi Arabia) 1995	Did not qualify								
(Saudi Arabia) 1997	Did not qualify								
(Mexico) 1999	Group stage	6th	3	0	2	1	2	3	Squad
(South Korea) (Japan) 2001	Did not qualify								
(France) 2003	Did not qualify								
(Germany) 2005	Did not qualify								
(South Africa) 2009	Did not qualify								
(Brazil) 2013	Did not qualify								
(Russia) 2017	Did not qualify								
Total	Group stage	1/10	3	0	2	1	2	3	—

FIFA Confederations Cup record
Year	Round	Score	Result
1999	Group stage	Bolivia 2–2 Egypt	Draw
1999	Group stage	Bolivia 0–0 Saudi Arabia	Draw
1999	Group stage	Bolivia 0–1 Mexico	Loss

=== Pan American Games ===
Pan American Games record
Year	Round	Position	Pld	W	D	L	GF	GA
(Argentina) 1951	Did not participate							
(Mexico) 1955	Did not participate							
(United States) 1959	Did not participate							
(Brazil) 1963	Did not participate							
(Canada) 1967	Did not participate							
(Colombia) 1971	Did not participate							
(Mexico) 1975	Round 2	6th	5	2	0	3	4	14
(Puerto Rico) 1979	Did not participate							
(Venezuela) 1983	Did not participate							
(United States) 1987	Did not participate							
(Cuba) 1991	Did not participate							
(Argentina) 1995	Did not participate							
Since 1999	See Bolivia national under-23 football team							
Total	Round 2	1/12	5	2	0	3	4	14

== Honours ==
=== Continental ===
- South American Championship / Copa América
  - (gold) Champions (1): 1963
  - (silver) Runners-up (1): 1997

=== Regional ===
- Bolivarian Games
  - (gold) Gold medal (2): 1970, 1977
  - (silver) Silver medal (2): 1938, 1947–48^{s}
  - (bronze) Bronze medal (2): 1965, 1973^{s}

=== Friendly ===
- Copa Paz del Chaco (4): 1957, 1962, 1979, 1993
- Copa Mariscal Sucre (1): 1973^{s}

=== Summary ===
Competition	1st place, gold medalist(s)	2nd place, silver medalist(s)	3rd place, bronze medalist(s)	Total
CONMEBOL Copa América	1	1	0	2
Total	1	1	0	2

Notes

- ^{s} Shared titles.

== See also ==
- Bolivia national under-23 football team
- Bolivia national under-20 football team
- Bolivia national under-17 football team
- Bolivia national futsal team
