= Marco Sandy =

Bolivian footballer (born 1971)

Personal information
- Full name: Marco Antonio Sandy Sansusty
- Date of birth: 29 August 1971 (age 55)
- Place of birth: Cochabamba, Bolivia
- Height: 1.83 m (6 ft 0 in)
- Position: Defender

Team information
- Current team: Jorge Wilstermann (assistant)

Youth career
- Enrique Happ

Senior career*
Years	Team	Apps	(Gls)
1990	Tembetary		
1990–1995	Bolívar		
1995–1996	Valladolid	4	(0)
1996–1998	Bolívar		
1998–2000	Gimnasia de Jujuy	46	(4)
2000–2001	Bolívar		
2001–2002	Tampico Madero	3	(0)
2002–2006	Bolívar		

International career
1993–2003	Bolivia	93	(6)

Managerial career
- 2007: Bolívar
- 2010–2011: Bolivia U20
- 2012–2013: Bolivia (assistant)
- 2014: Real Potosí
- 2014: Bolivia (women)
- 2015: Universitario Sucre
- 2016: Real Potosí
- 2017: Bolivia U20
- 2020–2021: Jorge Wilstermann (youth)
- 2021: Jorge Wilstermann (caretaker)
- 2021: Real Potosí
- 2021–: Jorge Wilstermann (assistant)
- * Club domestic league appearances and goals

Marco Antonio Sandy Sansusty (born 29 August 1971) is a Bolivian football manager and former player who played as a defender. He is the current assistant manager of Jorge Wilstermann.

== Playing career ==
=== Club ===
On club level he spent the majority of his career with Bolívar, apart from four spells abroad with Club Atlético Tembetary of Paraguay (where he debuted professionally), Real Valladolid of Spain, Gimnasia de Jujuy of Argentina and Tampico Madero of Mexico.

=== International ===
He played 93 international matches for Bolivia between 1993 and 2003. He played at the 1994 FIFA World Cup. Sandy made his international debut on 29 January 1993, in a friendly match against Honduras (3–1 win) in Cochabamba. He was the national record holder with 93 caps for nearly two years. Luis Cristaldo equalled his tally, playing his last and 93rd international match on 9 October 2005, against Brazil. Sandy played his last international match for Bolivia on 18 November 2003: a World Cup Qualifier against Venezuela in Maracaibo.

== Career statistics ==
Scores and results list Bolivia's goal tally first, score column indicates score after each Sandy goal.

List of international goals scored by Marco Sandy
No.	Date	Venue	Opponent	Score	Result	Competition
1	13 June 1993	La Paz, Bolivia	Chile	1–2	1–3	Friendly
2	22 August 1993	La Paz, Bolivia	Venezuela	4–0	7–0	1994 FIFA World Cup qualification
3	1 July 1995	Lima, Peru	Peru	1–0	1–4	Friendly
4	7 July 1996	La Paz, Bolivia	Venezuela	1–0	6–1	1998 FIFA World Cup qualification
5	10 November 1996	La Paz, Bolivia	Colombia	1–0	2–2	1998 FIFA World Cup qualification
6	2 April 1997	La Paz, Bolivia	Argentina	1–0	2–1	1998 FIFA World Cup qualification
