= 1992 Campeonato Nacional Primera División =

Campeonato Nacional Copa Banco del Estado
- Dates: 30 May – 19 December 1992
- Champions: Cobreloa (5th title)
- Relegated: Fernández Vial; Huachipato
- 1993 Copa Libertadores: Cobreloa; Universidad Católica (Liguilla winners)
- Matches: 240
- Goals: 684 (2.85 per match)
- Top goalscorer: Aníbal González (24 goals)
- Biggest home win: Universidad Católica 7–0 Coquimbo Unido (14 November)
- Highest attendance: 69,305 Colo-Colo 1–1 Universidad de Chile (25 October)
- Total attendance: 2,045,360
- Average attendance: 8,522

The 1992 Campeonato Nacional, known as Campeonato Nacional Copa Banco del Estado 1992 for sponsorship purposes, was the 60th season of top-flight football in Chile. Cobreloa won fifth title following a 3–2 home win against Fernández Vial on 13 December. Universidad Católica also qualified for the next Copa Libertadores as Liguilla winners.

== Final table ==
Pos	Team	Pld	W	D	L	GF	GA	GD	Pts	Qualification or relegation
1	Cobreloa	30	17	10	3	56	31	+25	44	Champions and qualified for the 1993 Copa Libertadores
2	Colo-Colo	30	18	6	6	68	36	+32	42	Qualified for the Liguilla Pre-Copa Libertadores
3	Universidad Católica	30	16	9	5	67	29	+38	41	Qualified for the Liguilla Pre-Copa Libertadores
4	Universidad de Chile	30	12	10	8	38	29	+9	34	Qualified for the Liguilla Pre-Copa Libertadores
5	Unión Española	30	14	4	12	50	46	+4	32	Qualified for the Liguilla Pre-Copa Libertadores
6	O'Higgins	30	11	7	12	45	43	+2	29	Qualified for the Liguilla Pre-Copa Libertadores
7	Deportes Antofagasta	30	10	9	11	34	35	−1	29	Qualified for the Liguilla Pre-Copa Libertadores
8	Deportes Temuco	30	8	12	10	35	40	−5	28	
9	Deportes La Serena	30	9	9	12	30	35	−5	27	
10	Coquimbo Unido	30	9	9	12	41	53	−12	27	
11	Deportes Concepción	30	9	9	12	35	47	−12	27	
12	Palestino	30	10	7	13	44	61	−17	27	
13	Everton	30	9	8	13	43	47	−4	26	Promotion/relegation Liguilla
14	Cobresal	30	9	7	14	35	46	−11	25	Promotion/relegation Liguilla
15	Fernández Vial	30	5	14	11	29	39	−10	24	Relegated to Segunda División
16	Huachipato	30	6	6	18	34	67	−33	18	Relegated to Segunda División

Source: Solofutbol.cl

Campeonato Nacional de Chile
1992 champion
Cobreloa
5th title

== Results ==
Home \ Away	DAN	CLO	CSA	COL	DCO	COQ	EVE	FVI	HUA	DLS	OHI	PAL	DTE	UCA	UCH	UES
Antofagasta		1–3	1–1	1–1	3–0	2–1	1–0	1–1	3–0	0–0	1–0	4–0	0–0	2–1	2–3	0–2
Cobreloa	2–0		4–0	1–0	2–1	1–1	1–1	3–2	2–0	1–1	3–1	2–1	4–0	1–1	2–1	4–1
Cobresal	0–1	1–2		2–2	0–1	1–1	2–0	1–0	5–1	1–1	1–2	1–1	0–0	1–4	0–1	4–0
Colo-Colo	2–0	4–2	3–0		3–0	3–2	3–0	3–0	5–1	1–0	4–3	6–0	3–2	4–2	1–1	1–0
Concepción	1–1	2–4	2–1	1–4		3–2	1–0	0–0	2–1	2–0	1–2	3–1	0–0	0–1	2–2	3–0
Coquimbo	1–0	2–3	1–0	2–1	1–1		1–1	1–1	4–1	1–0	0–2	4–1	1–1	2–1	2–1	4–2
Everton	1–3	1–3	6–1	4–1	1–1	1–1		3–1	2–0	2–1	0–0	3–2	2–2	3–1	1–2	2–1
F. Vial	0–0	0–0	2–1	1–2	2–2	3–1	1–1		3–2	1–1	0–0	0–0	1–1	0–0	1–0	1–3
Huachipato	1–0	2–2	1–2	1–0	3–1	2–2	1–0	1–1		0–2	1–1	3–4	4–3	0–2	2–2	1–2
La Serena	2–1	1–1	1–2	2–2	0–1	3–1	1–2	1–0	1–0		1–1	2–2	1–0	1–5	2–0	1–0
O'Higgins	0–1	0–0	1–2	1–0	5–0	4–1	3–1	2–0	2–3	3–1		5–2	2–2	0–5	2–1	1–0
Palestino	1–1	0–2	2–0	1–3	2–1	2–0	2–0	4–3	1–0	0–1	1–1		3–1	0–5	0–0	1–3
Temuco	2–0	4–1	2–3	0–0	0–0	2–1	0–0	0–3	1–1	1–0	2–0	2–4		0–0	2–1	2–0
U. Católica	5–2	0–0	0–1	1–1	2–0	7–0	2–1	1–1	6–0	2–1	4–2	3–2	2–1		0–0	2–1
U. Chile	2–0	0–0	2–0	2–0	1–1	0–0	3–2	1–0	4–0	1–1	2–0	0–2	2–0	1–1		1–0
U. Española	2–2	2–0	1–1	3–5	3–2	3–0	5–2	3–0	2–1	1–0	2–0	2–2	1–2	1–1	3–1	

Source: Solofutbol.cl
Legend: Blue = home team win; Yellow = draw; Red = away team win.

== Topscorers ==
Pos	Name	Team	Goals
1	(Chile) Aníbal González	Colo Colo	24
2	(Argentina) Juan Carlos Almada	Universidad Católica	20
3	(Argentina) Gustavo De Luca	O'Higgins	18
4	(Panama) Jorge Dely Valdés	Unión Española	13
5	(Chile) Marcelo Corrales	Palestino	12
	(Paraguay) José Cardozo	Universidad Católica	12

== Liguilla Pre-Copa Libertadores ==
=== Preliminary round ===
Team 1	Agg.	Team 2	1st leg	2nd leg
Universidad de Chile*	2–4	Unión Española	1–0	1–4
O'Higgins	4–6	Universidad Católica	3–6	1–0
Deportes Antofagasta	1–4	Colo-Colo	0–3	1–1

* Qualified as "Best Loser"

2 January 1993	Colo-Colo	1 – 2	Unión Española	Estadio Nacional, Santiago
	Rubio 62'		37' Zambrano; 88' (pen.) Sierra	Attendance: 39,924; Referee: E. Gamboa

3 January 1993	Universidad de Chile	3 – 1	Universidad Católica	Estadio Nacional, Santiago
	Puyol 11' (pen.); Jara 31'; Cofré 57'		69' López	Attendance: 56,536; Referee: E. Marín

6 January 1993	Colo-Colo	2 – 2	Universidad Católica	Estadio Nacional, Santiago
	Martínez 8'; Adomaitis 42' (pen.)		52' Pérez; 65' Contreras	Attendance: 49,008; Referee: C. Robles

7 January 1993	Universidad de Chile	0 – 0	Unión Española	Estadio Nacional, Santiago
				Attendance: 59,236; Referee: I. Guerrero

10 January 1993	Universidad Católica	2 – 0	Unión Española	Monumental David Arellano, Santiago
	Barrera 70'; Contreras 82' (pen.)			Attendance: 15,715; Referee: G. Castro

10 January 1993	Colo-Colo	1 – 0	Universidad de Chile	Estadio Nacional, Santiago
	Rubio 88'			Attendance: 72,914; Referee: H. Silva

==== Liguilla play-off match ====
13 January 1993	Universidad de Chile	1 – 3	Universidad Católica	Estadio Nacional, Santiago
	Mora 12'		14', 42', 90' Almada	Attendance: 72,740; Referee: E. Marín

Universidad Católica also qualified for the 1993 Copa Libertadores

== Promotion/relegation Liguilla ==
26 December 1992	Deportes Melipilla	1 – 1	Cobresal	Estadio Sausalito, Viña del Mar
				Attendance: 4,912; Referee: J. Torrens

26 December 1992	Everton	2 – 0	Regional Atacama	Estadio Sausalito, Viña del Mar
				Attendance: 4,912; Referee: J. Massardo

28 December 1992	Deportes Melipilla	1 – 0	Regional Atacama	Estadio Sausalito, Viña del Mar
				Attendance: 3,802; Referee: N. Mondría

28 December 1992	Everton	3 – 0	Cobresal	Estadio Sausalito, Viña del Mar
				Attendance: 3,802; Referee: S. Vásquez

30 December 1992	Regional Atacama	1 – 1	Cobresal	Estadio Sausalito, Viña del Mar
				Attendance: 2,705; Referee: V. Ojeda

30 December 1992	Everton	3 – 2	Deportes Melipilla	Estadio Sausalito, Viña del Mar
				Attendance: 2,705; Referee: S. Toledo

Everton and Deportes Melipilla play in the 1993 Primera División season

== See also ==
- 1992 Copa Chile
