= Eduardo Vilches =

Chilean footballer (born 1963)

Personal information
- Full name: Eduardo Enrique Vilches Arriagada
- Date of birth: 21 April 1963 (age 63)
- Place of birth: Colina, Santiago, Chile
- Position: Defender

Senior career*
Years	Team	Apps	(Gls)
1979–1986	Magallanes		
1981	→ Malleco Unido (loan)		
1987	Universidad Católica		
1989–1994	Colo-Colo		
1994–1999	Necaxa	169	(0)
1999	Unión Española		
2000	Cobreloa		

International career
1990–1998	Chile	30	(1)

Managerial career
- 2014: Malleco Unido
- 2026–: Colo-Colo Providencia
- * Club domestic league appearances and goals

Eduardo Enrique Vilches Arriagada (born 21 April 1963) is a former Chilean footballer who played as a defender.

== Club career ==
Vilches began his professional career with Magallanes, before moving to Universidad Católica and Colo-Colo, with a brief step on loan at Malleco Unido. He also played for Necaxa in the Primera División de Mexico. In 1999 he returned to Chile and joined Unión Española, winning the 1999 Primera B.

== International career ==
Vilches made 30 appearances for the senior Chile national football team from 1990 to 1998. He made his debut on October 17, 1990 in a friendly match against Brazil (0-0).

== Coaching career ==
In 2014, Vilches coached Malleco Unido in the Segunda División Profesional de Chile.

In August 2026, Vilches joined the technical staff of the Colo-Colo academy based in Providencia commune.

== Personal life ==
Vilches was a candidate to councillor for La Reina commune in the 2024 Chilean regional elections.

== Honours ==
Universidad Católica

- Chilean Primera División (1): 1987

Colo-Colo

- Chilean Primera División (4): 1989, 1990, 1991, 1993
- Copa Chile (3): 1989, 1990, 1994
- Copa Libertadores (1): 1991
- Copa Interamericana (1): 1991
- Recopa Sudamericana (1): 1992

Necaxa

- Primera División (3): 1994–95, 1995–96, Invierno 1998
- Copa México (1): 1994–95
- Campeón de Campeones (1): 1994–95
- CONCACAF Cup Winners Cup (1): 1994
- CONCACAF Champions' Cup (1): 1999

Unión Española

- Primera B de Chile (1): 1999

Chile

- Copa Expedito Teixeira (1): 1990

Individual

- Primera División de México Best Defender: 1994–95
