= 1990 Copa Apertura =

Tournament details
- Country: Chile
- Dates: 18 March 1990-3 June 1990
- Teams: 16

Final positions
- Champions: COLO
- Runners-up: Universidad Católica
- Third place: O'Higgins
- Fourth place: Unión Española

Tournament statistics
- Top goal scorers: Tied at 13 goals: Adrián Czornomaz; Aníbal González; Gerardo Reinoso

The 1990 Copa Apertura was the 20th edition of the Chilean Cup tournament. The competition started on March 18, 1990, and concluded on June 3, 1990. Only first level teams took part in the tournament. Colo-Colo won the competition for their eighth time, beating Universidad Católica 3–2 on extra-time in the final. The points system in the first round awarded 2 points for a win, increased to 3 points if the team scored 4 or more goals. In the event of a tie, each team was awarded 1 point, but no points were awarded if the score was 0–0.

== Calendar ==
Round	Date
Group Round	18 March 1990; 23 May 1990
Quarterfinals	27 May 1990
Semi-finals	30 May 1990
Finals	3 June 1990

== Group Round ==
Key to colours in group tables
Teams that progressed to the Quarterfinals

=== Group 1 ===
	UCAT	CLOA	CSAL	PALE	DIQU	DLSE	HUAC	NAVA
U. Católica		1–3	4–1	6–4	2–0	3–2	2–2	4–3
Cobreloa	2–0		1–2	3–2	2–3	1–2	1–1	6–0
Cobresal	3–0	1–2		1–1	4–3	3–0	1–1	4–1
Palestino	0–1	0–0	1–1		2–4	0–3	0–3	4–3
D. Iquique	2–1	2–3	3–1	6–2		1–1	3–1	0–2
D. La Serena	0–1	2–2	3–2	1–0	3–2		1–1	3–3
Huachipato	6–0	2–1	2–1	2–3	1–1	2–1		1–2
Naval	2–1	2–2	4–1	2–1	1–0	2–0	4–1	

Rank	Team	Points
1	Naval	20
2	Universidad Católica	18
3	Cobreloa	16 (+9)
4	Huachipato	16 (+5)
5	Deportes Iquique	16 (+4)
6	Cobresal	15
7	Deportes La Serena	14
8	Palestino	7

=== Group 2 ===
	COLO	UCHI	UESP	EVER	SWAN	OHIG	DCON	FVIA
Colo-Colo		1–0	0–0	5–0	4–1	6–1	4–3	1–1
U. de Chile	0–3		1–5	4–4	5–2	2–2	1–1	3–1
U. Española	2–2	2–1		3–0	3–2	0–4	2–3	5–0
Everton	2–2	3–0	2–2		1–2	4–0	5–3	2–0
S. Wanderers	4–3	1–1	0–2	3–2		0–0	1–0	3–2
O'Higgins	1–3	3–1	1–2	4–2	3–0		3–1	7–1
D. Concepción	2–1	4–2	1–2	1–1	5–1	2–2		2–2
F. Vial	2–1	1–1	0–2	2–1	2–3	2–2	1–3	

Rank	Team	Points
1	Unión Española	22
2	Colo-Colo	21
3	O'Higgins	18
4	Deportes Concepción	16
5	Everton	14 (−2)
6	Santiago Wanderers	14 (−10)
7	Universidad de Chile	10
8	Fernández Vial	8

== Quarterfinals ==
Home team	Score	Away team
Universidad Católica	7–1	Deportes Concepción
Unión Española	4–0	Huachipato
Colo-Colo	6–5	Cobreloa
O'Higgins	4–1	Naval

== Semifinals ==
May 30, 1990

Universidad Católica	3–1	Unión Española
Barrera 2'; Reinoso 44', 47'		56' J. González

Estadio Nacional, Santiago
Attendance: 16,887
Referee: J. Massardo
May 30, 1990

Colo-Colo	3–2	O'Higgins
Melendez 44' (o.g.); Dabrowski 50'; Ormeño 85'		26' A. González; 57' Sánchez

Estadio Nacional, Santiago
Attendance: 16,887
Referee: G. Castro

== Third place match ==
June 3, 1990

Unión Española	2–4	O'Higgins
J.C. González 2'; Zambrano 30'		22', 78' A. González; 54' Reyes; 67' (o.g.) J.C. González

Estadio Nacional, Santiago
Attendance: 43,237
Referee: S. Imperatore

== Final ==
June 3, 1990

Colo-Colo	3 – 2 (a.e.t.)	Universidad Católica
Díaz 14'; Dabrowski 65'; Margas 110'		36' Barrera; 89' Reinoso

Estadio Nacional, Santiago
Attendance: 43,237
Referee: E. Marín

Lineups in the Final

Colo-Colo:
Daniel Morón; Rubén Espinoza, Eduardo Vilches, Lizardo Garrido, Javier Margas; Raúl Ormeño, Jaime Pizarro, Sergio Díaz, Marcelo Barticciotto (84' Guillermo Carreño), Ricardo Dabrowski, Rubén Martínez (72' Miguel Ramírez).
DT: Arturo Salah.
----------------------------------------------------------------------------------------------
Universidad Católica:
Marco Cornez; Rodrigo Blasco, Pablo Yoma, Hugo Monardes; Fabian Estay, Nelson Parraguez, Luis Pérez, Jorge Contreras, Gerardo Reinoso, Rodrigo Barrera (76' Francisco Hórmann), Raimundo Tupper.
DT: Ignacio Prieto.

== Top goalscorers ==
- Adrián Czornomaz (Cobreloa) 13 goals
- Aníbal González (O'Higgins) 13 goals
- Gerardo Reinoso (Universidad Católica) 13 goals

== See also ==
- 1990 Campeonato Nacional
