= Raúl Ormeño =

Chilean footballer (born 1958)

Personal information
- Full name: Raúl Elias Ormeño Pacheco
- Date of birth: June 21, 1958 (age 68)
- Place of birth: Temuco, Chile
- Height: 1.77 m (5 ft 9 1/2 in)
- Position: Midfielder

Senior career*
Years	Team	Apps	(Gls)
1975–1992	Colo Colo	330	(20)

International career
1977–1979	Chile U20		
1978–1990	Chile	11	(1)

Managerial career
- 2007–2008: San Luis
- * Club domestic league appearances and goals

Raúl Elias Ormeño Pacheco (born June 21, 1958) is a Chilean former football defensive midfielder.

== Playing career ==
He played for only one club in Chile, Colo Colo.

At international level, he represented Chile at under-20 level in both the 1977 and the 1979 South American Championships.

At senior level, he represented his native country at the 1982 FIFA World Cup, wearing the number fourteen jersey. In total, he made 11 appearances for Chile and scored a goal versus El Salvador on 7 May 1989.

== Coaching career ==
He was the manager of San Luis de Quillota in the Primera B between 2007 and 2008.

== Personal life ==
He is the father of the professional footballers Álvaro, who also played for Colo-Colo and the Chile national team, and Martín.

== Honours ==
=== Club ===
Colo-Colo

- Primera División (7): 1979, 1981, 1983, 1986, 1989, 1990, 1991
- Copa Chile (6): 1981, 1982, 1985, 1988, 1989, 1990
- Copa Libertadores (1): 1991

=== International ===
Chile

- Copa Expedito Teixeira (1): 1990
