= Copa Teixeira =

- Event: Friendly match
Brazil	Chile
(Brazil)	(Chile)
0	0
- Title shared so no winner was declared

First leg
Brazil	Chile
0	0
- Date: 17 October 1990
- Venue: Estadio Nacional, Santiago
- Attendance: 37,000

Second leg
Chile	Brazil
0	0
- Date: 8 November 1990
- Venue: Mangueirão, Belém
- Attendance: 33,664

The Copa Texeira (English: Teixeira Cup), was a friendly football match realized between Brazil and Chile, in order to seal the peace between the two national teams, after the incident at the Estádio do Maracanã that took place during a match valid for the 1990 FIFA World Cup qualifiers.

The series were played in a two-legged format. After both matches ended 0-0, the Copa Teixeira title ended up split, with both teams receiving a copy of the trophy.

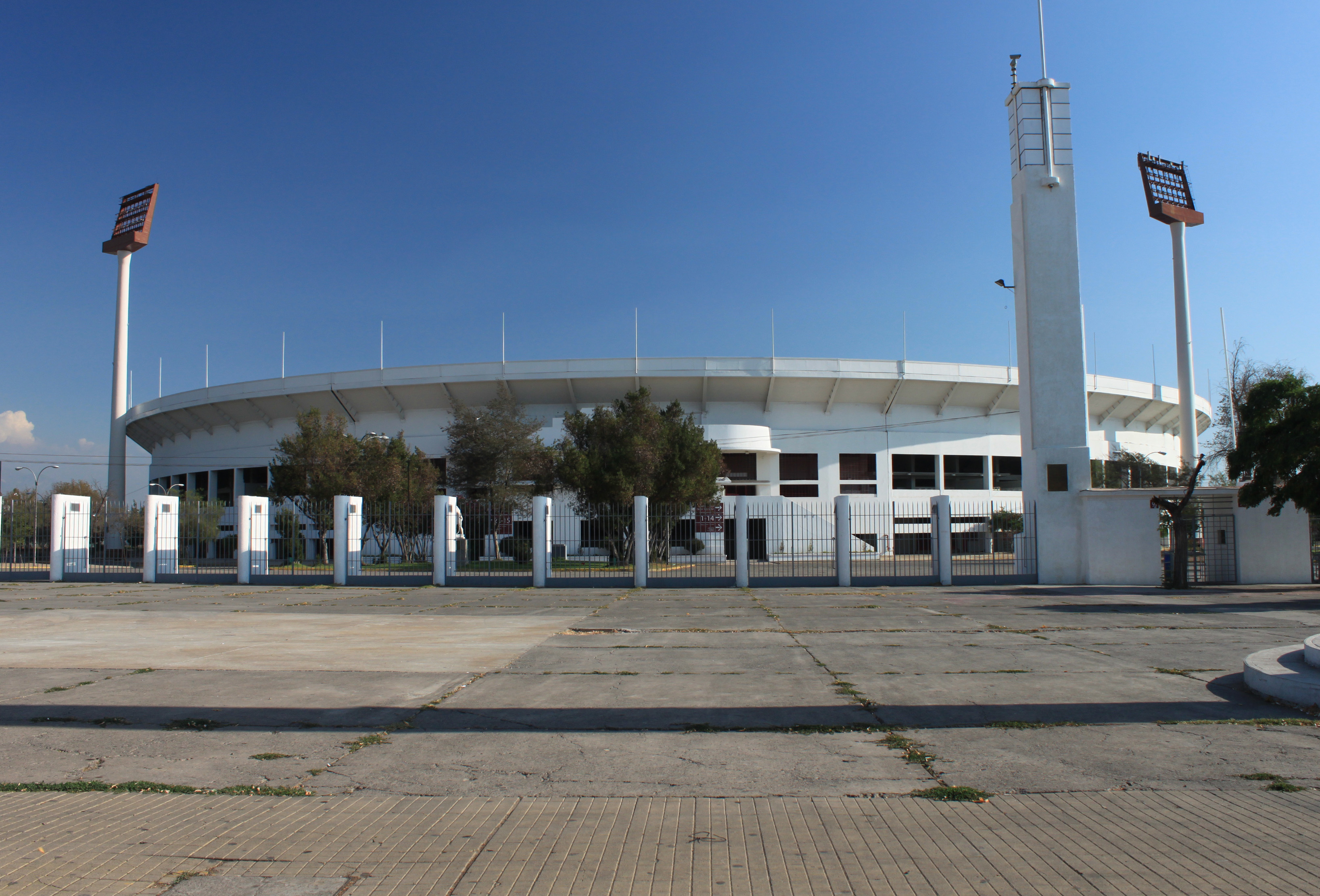
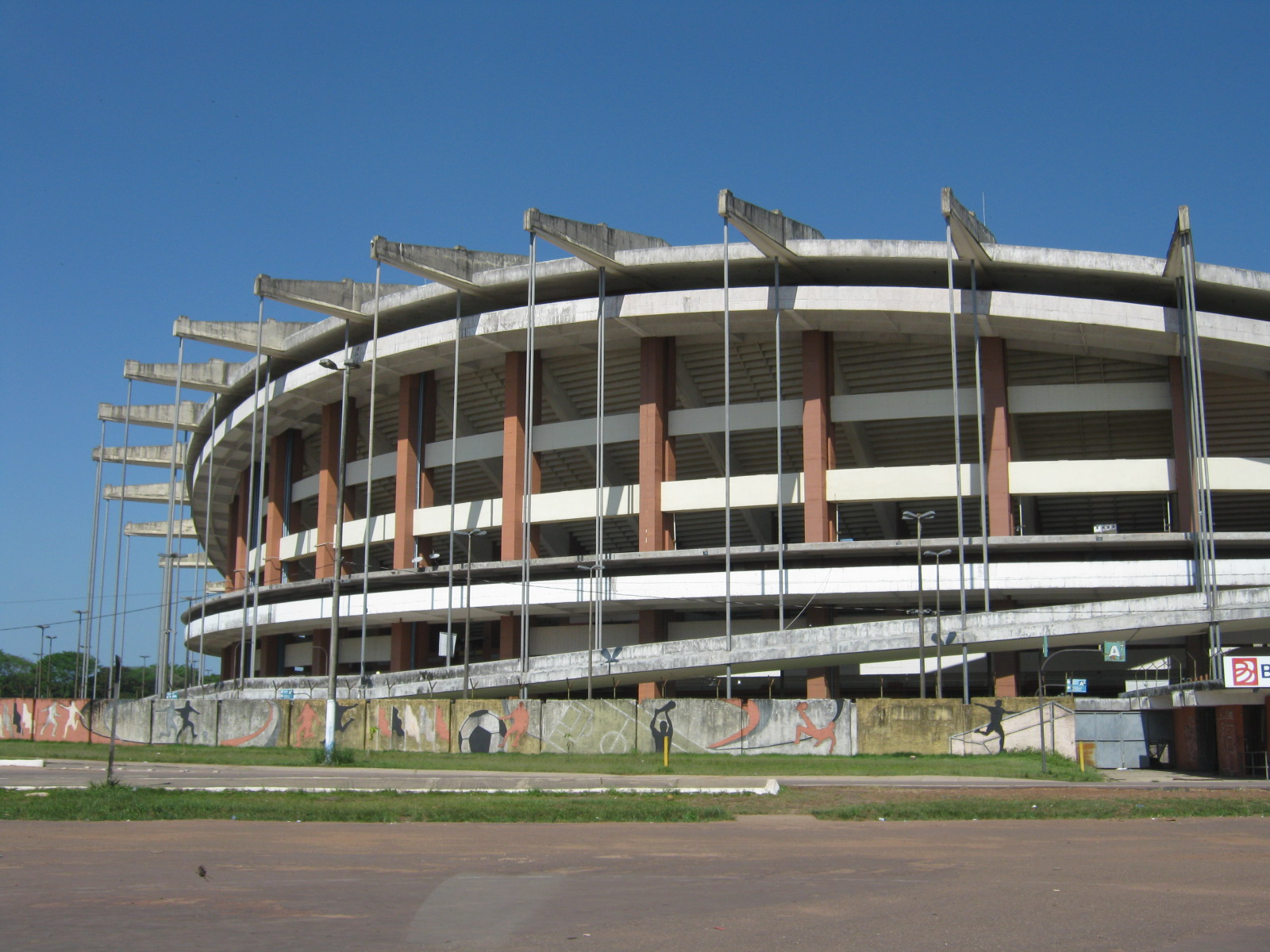
Estadio Nacional in Santiago (left) and Estádio do Mangueirão in Belém, venues for the series

== Match details ==
=== First leg ===
October 17, 1990

Chile	0–0	Brazil
	Report

Estadio Nacional de Chile, Santiago
Attendance: 37,000
Referee: Enrique Marin Gallo (CHI)

Chile
Brazil

GK	Marco Cornez
DF	Rubén Espinoza
DF	Lizardo Garrido
DF	Eduardo Vilches
DF	Javier Margas
MF	Jaime Pizarro
MF	Jorge Contreras	(substituted off) a'
MF	Fabián Estay
FW	Jorge Aravena
FW	Ramón Garrido
FW	Rubén Martínez	(substituted off) b'
Substitutes:
MF	Luis Pérez	(substituted on) a'
FW	Aníbal González	(substituted on) b'
Manager:
(Chile) Arturo Salah

GK	1	Sérgio
DF	2	Gil Baiano
DF	3	Paulão
DF	4	Adílson
DF	6	Leonardo
MF	5	César Sampaio
MF	8	Donizete Oliveira	(substituted off) a'
MF	7	Cafu
FW	10	Neto
FW	9	Túlio
FW	11	Charles	(substituted off) b'
Substitutes:
MF	15	Bismarck	(substituted on) a'
MF	17	Valdeir	(substituted on) b'
Manager:
(Brazil) Paulo Roberto Falcão

=== Second leg ===
November 8, 1990

Brazil	0–0	Chile
	Report

Mangueirão, Belém
Attendance: 33,664
Referee: Luis Carlos Felix (BRA)

Brazil
Chile

GK	1	Sérgio
DF	2	Gil Baiano		(substituted off) a'
DF	3	Paulão		(substituted off) b'
DF	4	Adílson
DF	6	Lira
MF	5	César Sampaio		(substituted off) c'
MF	8	Donizete Oliveira
MF	7	Cafu
FW	10	Neto	(substituted off) d'
FW	9	Charles
FW	11	Careca Bianchezi
Substitutes:
MF	15	Luís Henrique		(substituted on) a'
DF	13	Cléber		(substituted on) b'
MF	14	Leonardo		(substituted on) c'
MF	16	Valdeir		(substituted on) d'
Manager:
(Brazil) Paulo Roberto Falcão

GK	Marco Cornez
DF	Andrés Romero
DF	Lizardo Garrido
DF	Eduardo Vilches
DF	Javier Margas
MF	Jaime Pizarro
MF	Raúl Ormeño
MF	Jorge Contreras	(substituted off) a'
FW	Fabián Estay
FW	Aníbal González	(substituted off) b'
FW	Rubén Martínez	(substituted off) c'
Substitutes:
MF	Héctor Puebla	(substituted on) a'
FW	Richard Zambrano	(substituted on) b'
FW	Luis Guarda	(substituted on) c'
Manager:
(Chile) Arturo Salah

== See also ==
- Copa Bernardo O'Higgins
