= Ricardo Dabrowski =

Argentine footballer

Personal information
- Full name: Ricardo Mariano Dabrowski
- Date of birth: 21 March 1961 (age 65)
- Place of birth: Lomas de Zamora, Argentina
- Height: 1.87 m (6 ft 2 in)
- Position: Forward

Senior career*
Years	Team	Apps	(Gls)
1978–1982	Temperley	55	(17)
1983	Huracán	29	(6)
1984–1985	Toluca		
1985	Platense	11	(1)
1986–1987	Temperley	29	(11)
1987–1992	Colo-Colo	189	(83)

Managerial career
- 1992: Colo-Colo (assistant)
- 1993: Magallanes
- 1993: Palestino
- 1994: Colo-Colo (assistant)
- 1998: Newell's Old Boys (assistant)
- 1998: Newell's Old Boys (interim)
- 1998–2001: Palestino
- 2002: Santiago Wanderers
- 2004: Aldosivi
- 2004: Colo-Colo
- 2005: Colo-Colo
- 2008: Deportes Melipilla
- 2009: Tiro Federal
- 2010–2011: Temperley
- 2011–2013: Sol de América
- 2014: 3 de Febrero
- 2015–2016: Nacional Asunción
- * Club domestic league appearances and goals

Ricardo Mariano Dabrowski (born 28 March 1961) is an Argentine former football player and manager. He played as a forward for clubs in Argentina, Chile and Mexico.

A native of Temperley, Dabrowski (also known as Ruso) played football with his hometown's Club Atlético Temperley before spending most of his playing career in Chilean football. In 2010, he re-joined Temperley as the club's manager.

== Club career ==
After retiring as a player, Dabrowski began his coaching career in the early 1990s. In 1992 he joined Colo-Colo as an assistant coach and later returned to the role in 1994. In 1993 he had brief managerial spells with Magallanes and Palestino. In 1998 he worked with Newell's Old Boys, initially as an assistant and later as interim manager, before returning to Palestino, where he managed the club from 1998 to 2001.

He subsequently managed Santiago Wanderers in 2002, and Aldosivi in 2004. Later that year he was appointed manager of Colo-Colo, remaining in charge until early 2005.

Later appointments included Deportes Melipilla in 2008 and Tiro Federal in 2009. Dabrowski later returned to Temperley, managing the Argentine club between 2010 and 2011, before continuing his career in Paraguayan football with Sol de América (2011–2013), 3 de Febrero (2014) and Nacional Asunción (2015–2016).

== Titles ==
=== Club ===
Colo-Colo

- Primera División de Chile (3): 1989, 1990, 1991
- Copa Libertadores (1): 1991
