= Marcelo Barticciotto =

Argentine-Chilean footballer and manager

Personal information
- Full name: Marcelo Pablo Barticciotto Cicaré
- Date of birth: 1 January 1967 (age 59)
- Place of birth: Avellaneda, Argentina
- Height: 1.80 m (5 ft 11 in)
- Position: Midfielder

Youth career
- Huracán

Senior career*
Years	Team	Apps	(Gls)
1987–1988	Huracán	72	(12)
1988–1992	Colo-Colo	269	(76)
1993–1995	América	38	(3)
1995	→ Universidad Católica (loan)	9	(2)
1996–2002	Colo-Colo	142	(17)

Managerial career
- 2007–2008: U. de Concepción
- 2008–2009: Colo-Colo
- 2010: Audax Italiano
- * Club domestic league appearances and goals as of 22 August 2015

Marcelo Pablo Barticciotto Cicaré (born 1 January 1967) is an Argentine-Chilean former footballer and manager.

== Club career ==
In 1987, Barticciotto made his professional debut with Huracán of the National B Division in Argentina.

Barticciotto arrived to Chilean club Colo-Colo in 1988, where he would become an idol to supporters. Barticciotto won seven national championships and three international championships in twelve years with the club. The most important of those championships was the Copa Libertadores 1991, where he scored three goals. Colo-Colo is the only Chilean team to ever win the Copa Libertadores.

After these accomplishments, Barticciotto signed for Club América in Mexico. However, he did not experience the same form he had in Chile and in 1995 returned to Chile to sign for Colo-Colo's rival Universidad Católica. His time here was even shorter. In a game against his old team, Colo-Colo, Barticciotto scored the lone goal of the match which eliminated Colo-Colo from the Copa Libertadores tournament of the same year. Before the game, Barticciotto had stated in an interview that he did not want to score a goal against his former team but wanted to play a very good game. Therefore, when he scored the goal he did not celebrate it. Afterwards he reiterated that he wished he did not score the goal. Of course there was backlash from these comments and his actions and this ultimately led to his dismissal from the team.

In 1996, Barticciotto made his return to Colo-Colo. He regained his form and was an important part of the reason that Colo-Colo would win three straight championships from 1996 to 1998. In his final season, 2002, Colo-Colo would go on to win his seventh championship but was not a fixture in the starting line-up for most of the season.

On January 12, 2003, he retired in front of more than fifty thousands spectators in Colo-Colo's stadium, Estadio Monumental David Arellano. He retired having won the second most championships by a Colo-Colo player, behind only Luis Mena who has nine.

== Managerial career ==
Barticciotto was hired to manage U. de Concepción in 2007. Barticciotto inherited a team that was on the verge of relegation and took them to the final of the 2007 Clausura tournament against his former club Colo-Colo.

During the 2008 Clausura and with the resignation of Colo-Colo manager Fernando Astengo as the team was tied for first place in the table, Barticciotto was signed on to direct the team. In the first game with Baricciotto as coach Colo-Colo went on to defeat Santiago Morning 2–1 with 2 goals from Lucas Barrios with one being done by bicycle kick. Colo-Colo went on to lose the two following games which in turn earned Barticiotto criticism from both the press and fans alike. The turning point was a 2–0 victory against rivals Universidad de Chile. Barticiotto and Colo-Colo went on to the play-offs and obtain the 2008 Clausura championship and qualify for the Copa Libertadores 2009. On 17 April 2009 the Coach Barticciotto has quit Colo Colo, the new coach is Gualberto Jara.

== Personal life ==
He is the father of Bruno Barticciotto, a Chilean professional footballer who began his career playing for Universidad Católica.

== Honours ==
=== Club ===
==== As player ====
Colo-Colo

- Primera División de Chile (7): 1989, 1990, 1991, 1996, 1998, 1997 Clausura, 2002 Clausura
- Copa Chile (2): 1989, 1990
- Copa Libertadores (1): 1991
- Recopa Sudamericana (1): 1992
- Copa Interamericana (1): 1992

==== As manager ====
Colo-Colo

- Primera División de Chile: 2008 Clausura
