= Javier Margas =

Chilean footballer (born 1969)

Personal information
- Full name: Javier Luciano Margas Loyola
- Date of birth: 10 May 1969 (age 57)
- Place of birth: Santiago, Chile
- Height: 1.88 m (6 ft 2 in)
- Position: Defender

Senior career*
Years	Team	Apps	(Gls)
1988–1996	Colo-Colo	167	(10)
1996	Club América	9	(1)
1997–1998	Universidad Católica	21	(2)
1998–2001	West Ham United	24	(1)
Total		221	(14)

International career
1990–2000	Chile	63	(6)
- * Club domestic league appearances and goals

Javier Luciano Margas Loyola (born 10 May 1969) is a Chilean former professional footballer who played as a defender.

== Club career ==
=== Colo-Colo ===
Margas was born in Santiago de Chile. He experienced the most successful period in his career with his first club Colo-Colo, where he was part of four league championship winning squads. He was also part of the club's first Copa Libertadores win in 1991, and also won two other international tournaments.

=== Club América ===
In 1996 Margas joined Club América in Mexico later returned to Chile in 1997.

=== Universidad Católica ===
Margas then joined Universidad Católica, where he was part of the squad that won the 1997 Apertura.

=== West Ham United ===
Margas' last years as a player were spent with West Ham United. He scored once during his spell with West Ham, in a 5–0 win over Coventry City in April 2000. In 2001, Margas gained notoriety for disappearing from England without a trace and many weeks passed before he was found in his home country, having effectively retired from football. He briefly trained with Universidad de Chile before ultimately retiring for good.

== International career ==
Margas played 63 times for the Chile national team. He played in Chile's four games at the 1998 FIFA World Cup.

== Personal life ==
Margas was famous for dyeing his hair in different colours and shapes (most notably with the Chilean flag colours); in his appearance in the 1998 World Cup, his hair was dyed bright red.

Since retiring from football, Margas has worked as a youth coach at Colo-Colo, appeared on a reality TV show called Expedición Robinson, ran his own business, and bought former dictator Augusto Pinochet's armoured car.

His daughter, Catalina, was a Chile international footballer at under-17 level and took part in the 2008 South American U-17 Women's Championship. His son, Luis, is a central defender from the Santiago Wanderers youth system and was called up to the first team in May 2023 at the age of seventeen.

He is the father-in-law of Chilean footballer, Nicolás Peñailillo.

== Career statistics ==
Scores and results list Chile's goal tally first, score column indicates score after each Margas goal.

List of international goals scored by Javier Margas
No.	Date	Venue	Opponent	Score	Result	Competition
	3 February 1996	Cochabamba, Bolivia	Bolivia		1–1	Friendly
	2 June 1996	Barinas, Venezuela	Venezuela		1–1	1998 FIFA World Cup qualification
	9 October 1996	Asunción, Paraguay	Paraguay		1–2	1998 FIFA World Cup qualification
	7 November 1997	Antofagasta, Chile	Guatemala		4–1	Friendly
	22 April 1998	Santiago, Chile	Colombia		2–2	Friendly
	26 April 2000	Lima, Peru	Peru		1–1	2002 FIFA World Cup qualification

== Honours ==
Colo-Colo

- Primera División de Chile: 1989, 1990, 1991, 1993, 1996
- Copa Libertadores: 1991
- Recopa Sudamericana: 1991
- Copa Interamericana: 1992
- Copa Chile: 1988, 1989, 1990, 1994

Universidad Católica

- Primera División de Chile: 1997–A

West Ham

- UEFA Intertoto Cup: 1999
