= Jaime Pizarro =

Chilean footballer and politician (born 1964)

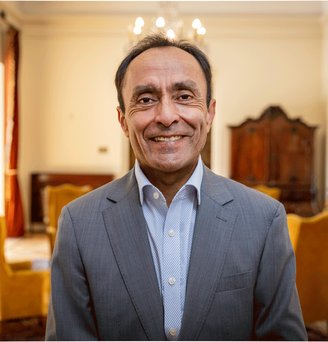
- Pizarro in 2023

Minister of Sports
- In office 10 March 2023 – 11 March 2026
- President: Gabriel Boric
- Preceded by: Alexandra Benado
- Succeeded by: Natalia Ducó

Undersecretary of Sports
- In office 30 July 2007 – 17 November 2009
- President: Michelle Bachelet
- Preceded by: Ricardo Vorpahl
- Succeeded by: Marcela González

Personal details
- Born: Jaime Augusto Pizarro Herrera; 2 March 1964 (age 62) Santiago, Chile
Association football career
- Position: Midfielder
Youth career
- 1977–1983: Colo-Colo
Senior career*
Years	Team	Apps	(Gls)
1983–1993	Colo-Colo	236	(25)
1993	Argentinos Juniors	13	(1)
1994	Barcelona SC	9	(0)
1995	Tigres UANL	18	(0)
1996	Palestino	29	(2)
1997–1999	Universidad Católica	63	(5)
Total		368	(33)
International career
1986–1993	Chile	53	(1)
Managerial career
- –2001: Universidad Católica (sport manager)
- 2001: Chile (assistant)
- 2002–2004: Colo-Colo
- 2005: Audax Italiano
- 2006–2007: Palestino
- 2011–2012: Colo-Colo (sport manager)
- 2018: Santiago Wanderers (sport manager)
- 2021: Barnechea
- 2026–: Colo-Colo (sporting director)
- * Club domestic league appearances and goals

Jaime Augusto Pizarro Herrera (born 2 March 1964) is a Chilean politician, teacher, and former football player and coach who played 53 times for the Chile national team between 1986 and 1993. He serves as minister of sports in Gabriel Boric's government. He formerly served as sub-secretary of the National Institute of Sports of the government of Michelle Bachelet. At club level, he played as a midfielder, principally for the Chilean club Colo-Colo, the team where he was crowned champion both as a player and as a coach.

A teacher of physical education by profession, he has served director of the same career in the Central University of Chile.

== Club career ==
=== As player ===
He began his career in Colo-Colo making his professional debut in March 1982 in a friendly game against Olimpia. He played for Colo-Colo until 1993. For this team he won 6 national championships, 5 Apertura cups and 3 international titles, including the Copa Libertadores de América.

Later in his career he played for Argentinos Juniors and Barcelona Sporting Club, he came back for a brief period to Colo-Colo in 1994 to later play for UANL Tigres where he played for the entire year 1995. He returned to Chile to play for Palestino and Universidad Católica, where he won a seventh league championship in 1997.

=== As coach ===
He began his career as a coach in Colo-Colo where he won a championship and two runner-up trophies, with the club in bankruptcy.

After he left the "cacique" team, he has coached teams like Audax Italiano and Palestino, achieving with the later one to keep the category of a first division team after a terrible start of the competition in 2006.

=== As sub-secretary ===
On 30 July 2007, Chilean president Michelle Bachelet named Jaime Pizarro Sub-secretary of the National Institute of Sports (Chiledeportes), after the resignation of Ricardo Vorpahl.

== International career ==
Pizarro made his debut for the national senior squad on 6 May 1986, against Brazil. He obtained 53 caps, and played the Copa América 1987 final. His last international game was against the national team from Peru at Copa América 1993. His only goal came on 19 June 1989, in a friendly match against Uruguay (2-2) in Montevideo.

== Managerial career ==
He assumed as the coach of Colo-Colo for the 2002 season after being the sport manager of Universidad Católica and the assistant coach of Pedro García in the Chile national team. In 2005, he moved to Audax Italiano and, in 2007, he joined Palestino.

Next, he performed as sport manager and director of Colo-Colo (2011–2012) and Santiago Wanderers (2018). In 2021, he returned to coaching and joined Barnechea in the Primera B de Chile until July of the same year.

In May 2026, Pizarro assumed as sporting director of Colo-Colo.

== Personal life ==
He is the father of the professional footballer Vicente Pizarro.

== Honours ==
=== Club ===
Colo-Colo

- Primera División de Chile (6): 1983, 1986, 1989, 1990, 1991, 1993
- Copa Chile (5): 1982, 1985, 1988, 1989, 1990
- Copa Libertadores (1): 1991
- Copa Interamericana (1): 1992
- Recopa Sudamericana (1): 1992

Universidad Católica

- Primera División de Chile (1): 1997 Apertura

=== Individual ===
- Best defensive midfielder in the world for the magazine France Football in 1987–1988
- Best Chilean professional footballer for circle of Chilean Sports Journalists in 1991–1992
- Award for outstanding football career by the CONMEBOL 2009
