= Mauricio Illesca =

Chilean footballer (born 1972)

Personal information
- Full name: Mauricio Leonel Illesca Carreño
- Date of birth: 5 January 1972 (age 54)
- Place of birth: Concepción, Chile
- Height: 1.84 m (6 ft 0 in)
- Position: Striker

Youth career
- Escuela Barrabases
- 1984–1989: Universidad de Chile

Senior career*
Years	Team	Apps	(Gls)
1990–1994	Universidad de Chile	11	(1)
1992	→ Santiago Wanderers (loan)	20	(15)
1993	→ Deportes La Serena (loan)	0	(0)
1994	→ O'Higgins (loan)	18	(0)
1995	Colo-Colo	8	(6)
1996	Audax Italiano	25	(12)
1997	Las Palmas	5	(0)
1997	Audax Italiano	9	(5)
1998	Santiago Wanderers	8	(2)
1999	Deportes Concepción	6	(4)
2000	Ferro Carril Oeste	0	(0)
2000	Coquimbo Unido	7	(1)
2000	Santa Fe	2	(0)
Total		119	(46)

International career
1991	Chile U20		
1997	Chile	1	(0)
- * Club domestic league appearances and goals

Mauricio Leonel Illesca Carreño (born 5 January 1972) is a Chilean former professional footballer who played as a striker for clubs in Chile and abroad.

== Club career ==
Born in Concepción, Chile, as a child, Illesca was with Escuela Barrabases from San Eugenio neighborhood, Estación Central, Santiago. Then he joined Universidad de Chile youth system at the age of 12 and made his professional debut in a 1990 Copa Chile match versus Soinca Bata, scoring a goal in the 2–1 win. In 1992, he and his fellow Rodrigo Goldberg were loaned to Santiago Wanderers in the Chilean Segunda División. He is well remembered by the club fans due to the fact that he became the team goalscorer with 15 goals. In Chile, he also played for Deportes La Serena, O'Higgins, Colo-Colo, Audax Italiano, Deportes Concepción and Coquimbo Unido.

After a good season with Audax Italiano, in 1997 he had a brief step with Spanish club UD Las Palmas, making five appearances.

His last club was Independiente Santa Fe in Colombia, playing the last match in December 2000 versus América de Cali, becoming the four Chilean to play for the club after Carlos Molina, Juan Ramón Garrido and Luis Ceballos.

== International career ==
Illesca represented Chile at under-20 level in the 1991 South American Championship.

At senior level, he was a substitute in the World Cup qualification matches versus Peru and Bolivia in 1997. In addition, he took part in the friendly match versus Millonarios in October 1997.

== Personal life ==
Since he was a child, Illesca is nicknamed Bototo (Boot), like a comics character from Chilean magazine Barrabases, whose name coincides with the Escuela Barrabases where he began his career.

As a curiosity, the news about the arrest of a drug trafficker nicknamed Bototo Illesca, like Mauricio, was shown in a Chilean TV program from Mega channel in 2011. His former fellow footballer Tincho Gálvez thought that it was about Mauricio and called him, realizing that their nicknames matched.

== Post-retirement ==
He graduated as football manager at the INAF (National Football Institute).

He has studied and spent time in sport management and sport event organization. He is the executive director of Juventus Academy in Santiago, Chile, a franchise of Italian club Juventus, organizing sport events such as Bianconero Cup. Through his enterprise and football academy Futuro Azul (Blue Future), he has organized youth championships such as Coquimbo Cup, Santiago Kids and Santiago Cup Inter.
