= Juan Ramón Garrido =

Chilean footballer

Personal information
- Full name: Juan Ramón Garrido Meza
- Date of birth: 12 September 1963 (age 63)
- Place of birth: Santiago, Chile
- Position: Forward

Youth career
- 1979–1982: Santiago Morning

Senior career*
Years	Team	Apps	(Gls)
1980–1984	Santiago Morning		
1985	Deportes Victoria		
1986	Deportes Concepción		
1986	Ñublense		
1987	Deportes Valdivia		
1987	Curicó Unido		
1988	Deportes Linares		
1988	Deportes Antofagasta		
1989–1990	Palestino		
1990–1991	Tecos		
1991	Santa Fe	19	(4)
1991–1992	Palestino	16	(4)
1993	Unión San Felipe		
1994	Deportes Temuco		
1994	Unión San Felipe	7	(1)

International career
1983	Chile U20		
1990	Chile	2	(0)
- * Club domestic league appearances and goals

Juan Ramón Garrido Meza (born 12 September 1963) is a Chilean former professional footballer who played as a forward for clubs in Chile, Mexico and Colombia.

== Club career ==
Garrido had an extensive career in Chilean football. He began his career with Santiago Morning, making his debut at the age of 16. In his first season in the top division, he made four appearances. Next he played for several Chilean clubs such as Deportes Victoria, Deportes Concepción, Ñublense, Deportes Antofagasta, among others.

A well remembered player of Palestino, in his first stint with the club, he got promotion to the top division in the 1989 season, scoring twenty goals.

He played abroad between 1990 and 1991 for both Tecos in Mexico and Independiente Santa Fe in Colombia. In Santa Fe, he coincided with his compatriot Carlos Molina and they became the first Chileans who have played for the club before Luis Ceballos, Mauricio Illesca and Julio Gutiérrez.

His last club was Unión San Felipe in the 1994 season.

== International career ==
Garrido represented Chile at under-20 level in the 1983 South American Championship. Previously, he took part of another youth national teams alongside players such as Ivo Basay, Jorge Muñoz and Luis Pérez.

At senior level, he made two appearances in 1990. Both matches were 0–0 draws against Brazil in the Copa Expedito Teixeira.

== Honours ==
Chile

- Copa Expedito Teixeira: 1990
