= 1988 Campeonato Nacional Primera División =

Campeonato Nacional 1988
- Dates: 9 July 1988 – 15 January 1989
- Champions: Cobreloa (4th title)
- Relegated: Universidad de Chile; Palestino
- 1989 Copa Libertadores: Cobreloa; Colo-Colo (Liguilla winners)
- Matches: 240
- Goals: 601 (2.5 per match)
- Top goalscorer: Gustavo De Luca; Juan José Oré (18 goals)
- Biggest home win: Cobresal 7–0 D. La Serena (13 November)
- Highest attendance: 71,372 Universidad de Chile 3–0 Colo-Colo (11 January 1989)
- Total attendance: 1,632,209
- Average attendance: 6,801

The 1988 Campeonato Nacional was Chilean football league top tier's 56th season. Cobreloa was the tournament's champion, winning its fourth title.

== League table ==
Pos	Team	Pld	W	D	L	GF	GA	GD	Pts	Qualification or relegation
1	Cobreloa	30	17	6	7	47	27	+20	40	Champions; Qualified to 1988 Copa Libertadores
2	Cobresal	30	14	9	7	51	30	+21	37	
3	Deportes Iquique	30	13	8	9	46	35	+11	34	Qualified to Liguilla Pre-Copa Libertadores
4	Universidad Católica	30	14	5	11	41	35	+6	33	Qualified to Liguilla Pre-Copa Libertadores
5	Deportes La Serena	30	10	12	8	37	41	−4	32	Qualified to Liguilla Pre-Copa Libertadores
6	Colo-Colo	30	11	9	10	31	30	+1	31	Qualified to Liguilla Pre-Copa Libertadores
7	Fernández Vial	30	10	10	10	38	42	−4	30	
8	Huachipato	30	8	13	9	37	32	+5	29	
9	Deportes Concepción	30	11	7	12	30	32	−2	29	
10	Deportes Valdivia	30	10	8	12	40	46	−6	28	
11	Everton	30	10	8	12	32	39	−7	28	
12	Naval	30	9	9	12	39	45	−6	27	
13	O'Higgins	30	10	6	14	36	43	−7	26	Promotion/relegation Liguilla
14	Unión Española	30	9	8	13	34	41	−7	26	
15	Universidad de Chile	30	7	12	11	26	34	−8	26	Relegated to Segunda División
16	Palestino	30	8	8	14	36	49	−13	24	Relegated to Segunda División

Campeonato Nacional
1988 champions
Cobreloa
4th title

== Results ==
Home \ Away	CLO	CSA	COL	DCO	EVE	FVI	HUA	DIQ	DLS	NAV	OHI	PAL	UES	UCA	UCH	DVA
Cobreloa		2–1	1–0	3–0	1–0	5–1	2–1	3–3	2–0	2–0	5–1	3–0	2–0	2–1	1–0	2–1
Cobresal	1–0		2–1	1–1	2–0	3–4	2–2	2–1	7–0	1–0	2–0	5–0	0–1	3–1	5–0	2–0
Colo-Colo	0–2	2–0		2–1	1–1	2–0	2–1	1–0	3–1	2–3	0–4	1–2	2–2	0–0	1–0	0–0
Concepción	0–0	0–0	1–0		3–0	0–0	0–0	3–0	3–0	1–0	1–2	0–4	2–0	2–0	1–1	1–2
Everton	2–0	2–0	0–2	3–0		0–0	0–0	1–0	1–3	2–0	0–2	3–1	1–0	0–2	1–0	1–2
F. Vial	0–0	2–2	2–1	0–0	2–0		2–3	1–2	0–0	4–0	2–2	2–0	3–0	1–3	2–1	4–1
Huachipato	3–0	1–1	0–0	0–1	4–1	0–0		1–1	2–2	0–0	1–3	1–0	3–1	1–0	0–1	5–1
Iquique	2–0	0–0	1–1	1–0	4–2	4–0	2–1		2–1	1–1	3–0	5–0	0–2	2–1	0–0	0–1
La Serena	1–1	2–2	0–0	2–0	0–0	2–0	1–1	1–0		1–2	1–0	0–0	2–0	1–2	3–2	4–4
Naval	3–2	2–1	0–2	0–1	1–1	2–1	4–2	1–2	0–0		1–1	3–5	3–2	1–1	0–0	5–1
O'Higgins	1–0	0–1	1–0	2–1	1–1	1–2	0–0	1–2	1–1	0–2		1–2	0–1	3–1	2–1	2–1
Palestino	1–2	1–1	0–2	0–1	1–2	0–1	0–0	4–2	3–3	1–1	2–1		2–0	0–1	0–0	3–2
U. Española	0–2	0–1	2–2	3–1	2–2	1–1	1–0	1–2	2–3	1–1	2–0	1–1		1–2	1–0	3–1
U. Católica	4–2	0–1	0–0	3–2	4–1	3–0	2–0	0–0	0–1	2–1	2–0	3–2	1–3		0–0	1–2
U. de Chile	0–0	2–2	3–0	2–1	0–3	1–1	1–1	3–2	0–1	2–1	3–2	1–1	1–1	0–1		0–0
Valdivia	0–0	3–0	0–1	1–2	1–1	3–0	1–3	2–2	1–0	3–1	2–2	1–0	0–0	3–0	0–1	

Legend: Blue = home team win; Yellow = draw; Red = away team win.

== Topscorers ==
Name	Team	Goals
(Argentina) Gustavo De Luca	Deportes La Serena	18
(Peru) Juan José Oré	Deportes Iquique	18

== Liguilla Pre-Copa Libertadores ==
=== Semifinals ===
18 January 1989	Deportes La Serena	1 – 2	Colo-Colo	Estadio La Portada, La Serena
	Fré 73'		Barticciotto 14', 83'	Attendance: 12,156; Referee: S. Vásquez

18 January 1989	Deportes Iquique	1 – 0	Universidad Católica	Estadio Municipal, Iquique
	Carreño 13'			Attendance: 9,430; Referee: C. Robles M.

21 January 1989	Universidad Católica	3 – 1	Deportes Iquique	Estadio Nacional, Santiago
	Olmos 9'; Mardones 17'; C. Soto 41'		E. Díaz 76'	Attendance: 29,308; Referee: S. Vásquez

Deportes Iquique qualified for the final due to its better League head-to-head results (2-1 & 0-0)

21 January 1989	Colo-Colo	0 – 1	Deportes La Serena	Estadio Nacional, Santiago
			De Luca 70'	Attendance: 29,308; Referee: E. Marín

Colo-Colo qualified for the final due to its better League head-to-head results (3-1 & 0-0)

=== Final ===
25 January 1989	Colo-Colo	2 – 1	Deportes Iquique	Estadio Nacional, Santiago
	Pizarro 16'; Jáuregui 35'		Russo 51'	Attendance: 20,287; Referee: E. Marín

Colo-Colo qualified for the 1989 Copa Libertadores

== Promotion/relegation Liguilla ==
18 January 1989	Deportes Temuco	0 – 0	Deportes Arica	Estadio Municipal, Valparaíso
				Attendance: 1,085; Referee: S. Imperatore

21 January 1989	O'Higgins	2 – 0	Deportes Temuco	Estadio Municipal, Valparaíso
				Attendance: 3,871; Referee: J. Massardo

28 January 1989	O'Higgins	2 – 1	Deportes Arica	Estadio Municipal, Valparaíso
				Attendance: 4,708; Referee: S. Imperatore

Pos	Team	Pld	W	D	L	GF	GA	GD	Pts	Qualification
1	O'Higgins	2	2	0	0	4	1	+3	4	Remains in Primera División
2	Deportes Arica	2	0	1	1	1	2	−1	1	Remains in Segunda División
3	Deportes Temuco	2	0	1	1	0	2	−2	1	Remains in Segunda División

Source: rsssf.com

== See also ==
- 1988 Copa Digeder
