= Aníbal González =

Aníbal González may refer to:

- Aníbal González (footballer, born 1964), Chilean football forward
- Aníbal González (footballer, born 1995), Mexican football forward, and son of footballer born 1964
- Aníbal González Álvarez-Ossorio (1876–1929), Spanish architect
