= 1990 Campeonato Nacional Primera División =

Campeonato Nacional 1990
- Dates: 14 July 1990 – 13 January 1991
- Champions: Colo-Colo (17th title)
- Relegated: Deportes Iquique; Huachipato
- 1991 Copa Libertadores: Colo-Colo; Deportes Concepción (Liguilla winners)
- Matches: 240
- Goals: 685 (2.85 per match)
- Top goalscorer: Rubén Martínez (22 goals)
- Biggest home win: Deportes La Serena 7–0 Fernández Vial (5 December)
- Highest attendance: 60,941 Colo-Colo 2–0 Universidad de Chile (1 November)
- Total attendance: 1,820,790
- Average attendance: 7,587

The 1990 Campeonato Nacional, was the 58th season of top-flight football in Chile. Colo-Colo won its seventeenth title. Deportes Concepción, as Liguilla winners, also qualified for the next Copa Libertadores.

== League table ==
Pos	Team	Pld	W	D	L	GF	GA	GD	Pts	Qualification or relegation
1	Colo-Colo	30	17	10	3	60	22	+38	46 (Note: 2 extra points for winning Copa Chile)	Champions and qualified for the 1991 Copa Libertadores
2	Universidad Católica	30	13	11	6	64	41	+23	38 (Note: 1 extra point for reaching semifinals of Copa Chile)	Qualified for the Liguilla Pre-Copa Libertadores
3	Unión Española	30	13	10	7	60	37	+23	37	Qualified for the Liguilla Pre-Copa Libertadores
4	O'Higgins	30	15	4	11	52	45	+7	35	Qualified for the Liguilla Pre-Copa Libertadores
5	Palestino	30	12	9	9	52	45	+7	33	
6	Deportes Concepción	30	12	9	9	41	45	−4	33	Qualified for the Liguilla Pre-Copa Libertadores
7	Cobreloa	30	11	9	10	44	42	+2	31	
8	Deportes La Serena	30	9	12	9	44	41	+3	30	
9	Cobresal	30	9	11	10	34	38	−4	29	
10	Fernández Vial	30	7	13	10	29	49	−20	27	
11	Universidad de Chile	30	7	12	11	37	39	−2	26	
12	Santiago Wanderers	30	7	12	11	39	53	−14	26	
13	Naval	30	8	9	13	32	47	−15	25	promotion/relegation Liguilla
14	Everton	30	7	10	13	30	42	−12	24	promotion/relegation Liguilla
15	Deportes Iquique	30	9	6	15	43	56	−13	24	Relegated to Segunda División
16	Huachipato	30	3	15	12	24	43	−19	21	Relegated to Segunda División

Source: Solofutbol.cl

== Results ==
Home \ Away	CLO	CSA	COL	DCO	EVE	FVI	HUA	DIQ	DLS	NAV	OHI	PAL	UCA	UCH	UES	SWA
Cobreloa		1–1	1–0	2–0	2–1	1–0	5–1	2–0	2–1	1–2	4–1	1–1	1–1	2–2	0–2	5–0
Cobresal	1–1		0–4	1–2	1–0	1–0	3–1	3–1	2–3	0–0	3–2	1–0	2–0	1–1	1–2	4–1
Colo-Colo	3–0	1–0		4–1	4–1	1–1	2–1	6–1	3–1	3–2	3–0	0–0	1–0	2–0	0–3	6–0
Concepción	3–1	1–1	2–3		2–4	1–1	1–1	1–0	4–0	2–1	3–1	0–0	0–6	2–1	1–0	2–1
Everton	1–1	2–3	0–2	0–0		1–1	1–1	4–1	0–0	1–0	0–3	3–1	1–1	2–1	0–0	1–0
F. Vial	0–0	1–1	0–3	1–3	3–2		2–1	0–0	1–1	0–0	2–1	2–1	2–1	3–0	1–1	1–1
Huachipato	2–1	1–1	2–2	0–1	0–0	0–0		2–1	0–0	1–1	2–3	0–0	1–1	0–0	2–1	1–1
Iquique	3–1	1–0	0–2	0–1	2–1	3–2	2–2		4–0	1–3	2–1	1–2	0–2	4–0	2–2	2–2
La Serena	0–2	1–1	0–0	2–2	0–0	7–0	0–0	5–0		3–1	4–3	2–1	3–0	2–1	1–2	2–0
Naval	0–0	0–0	0–0	2–2	2–0	1–1	1–0	1–0	1–0		0–1	2–4	3–2	2–1	0–5	1–4
O'Higgins	4–3	0–0	1–0	0–0	4–0	4–0	2–0	2–1	2–0	3–2		3–0	3–4	1–0	2–1	2–0
Palestino	3–0	4–0	1–1	2–1	3–1	3–1	3–1	2–4	2–2	3–2	1–0		5–2	3–2	1–2	1–1
U. Católica	5–0	1–0	2–2	3–3	2–1	6–0	1–0	1–1	1–1	3–1	1–1	3–1		1–1	2–2	4–1
U. Chile	0–1	3–0	1–1	3–0	0–2	3–1	2–0	1–1	4–0	1–0	1–1	0–0	0–0		1–1	2–2
U. Española	3–2	1–1	1–1	2–0	2–0	0–0	4–0	3–2	1–1	1–1	6–0	5–2	3–4	2–4		1–2
S. Wanderers	1–1	2–1	0–0	2–0	0–0	1–2	1–1	2–3	1–1	4–0	2–1	2–2	1–4	1–1	3–1	

Source: Solofutbol.cl
Legend: Blue = home team win; Yellow = draw; Red = away team win.

== Top goalscorers ==
Rank	Name	Club	Goals
1	(Chile) Rubén Martínez	Colo-Colo	22
2	(Argentina) Gustavo De Luca	Deportes La Serena	19
3	(Chile) Aníbal González	O'Higgins	17
3	(Argentina) Gerardo Reinoso	Universidad Católica	17
5	(Chile) Juan González	Unión Española	16
5	(Chile) Richard Zambrano	Unión Española	16
7	(Argentina) Adrián Czornomaz	Cobreloa	14

== Title ==
Campeonato Nacional
1990 champions

17th title

== Liguilla Pre-Copa Libertadores ==
15 January 1991	Unión Española	0 – 1	O'Higgins	Estadio Nacional, Santiago
			43' Baroni	Attendance: 18,990; Referee: S. Imperatore

15 January 1991	Universidad Católica	4 – 0	Deportes Concepción	Estadio Nacional, Santiago
	Reinoso 15'; Percudani 41', 85'; Contreras 80'			Attendance: 18,990; Referee: E. Marín

17 January 1991	O'Higgins	0 – 3	Deportes Concepción	Estadio Nacional, Santiago
			9' R. Castillo; 75' (pen.), 83' Almada	Attendance: 17,626; Referee: I. Guerrero

17 January 1991	Unión Española	3 – 0	Universidad Católica	Estadio Nacional, Santiago
	Sierra 17' (pen.); Rodríguez 23'; P. González 68'			Attendance: 17,626; Referee: J. Silvagno

20 January 1991	Unión Española	0 – 2	Deportes Concepción	Estadio Nacional, Santiago
			44' (o.g.) Rivera; 68' Almada	Attendance: 25,721; Referee: C. Robles

20 January 1991	Universidad Católica	2 – 2	O'Higgins	Estadio Nacional, Santiago
	Contreras 50', 85'		Alfaro 56', 81'	Attendance: 25,721; Referee: S. Imperatore

Deportes Concepción also qualified for the 1991 Copa Libertadores

== Promotion/relegation Liguilla ==
17 January 1991	Naval	1 – 1	Rangers	Estadio Regional, Antofagasta
				Attendance: 20,920; Referee: S. Toledo

17 January 1991	Deportes Antofagasta	3 – 3	Everton	Estadio Regional, Antofagasta
				Attendance: 20,920; Referee: G. Castro

19 January 1991	Everton	1 – 1	Naval	Estadio Regional, Antofagasta
				Attendance: 21,222; Referee: S. Vásquez

19 January 1991	Deportes Antofagasta	3 – 3	Rangers	Estadio Regional, Antofagasta
				Attendance: 21,222; Referee: L. Navarrete

22 January 1991	Everton	2 – 0	Rangers	Estadio Regional, Antofagasta
				Attendance: 26,066; Referee: S. Vásquez

22 January 1991	Deportes Antofagasta	1 – 3	Naval	Estadio Regional, Antofagasta
				Attendance: 26,066; Referee: G. Castro

Everton and Deportes Antofagasta (after Naval was dissolved); will play in the 1991 Primera División

== See also ==
- 1990 Copa Apertura

== Sources ==
- RSSSF Page
