= 1991 Copa Chile =

Tournament details
- Country: Chile
- Teams: 36

Final positions
- Champions: Universidad Católica
- Runners-up: Cobreloa

Tournament statistics
- Top goal scorer: Gustavo De Luca (O'Higgins) 12 goals

The 1991 Copa Chile-Digeder was the 21st edition of the Chilean Cup tournament. The competition started on March 2, 1991, and concluded on November 13, 1991. Universidad Católica won the competition for their third time, beating Cobreloa 1–0 on the final. The points system used in the first round of the tournament was; 2 points for the winner; and, in case of a tie, each team took 1 point.

== Calendar ==
Round	Date
Group Round	2 March 1991; 21 April 1991
Round of 16	4–11 September 1991
Quarterfinals	3–16 October 1991
Semi-finals	23 October 1991; 6 November 1991
Final	13 November 1991

== Group Round ==
Key to colours in group tables
Teams that progressed to the second round

=== Group 1 ===
	DANT	DARI	CSAL	CLOA	DIQU	RATA
D. Antofagasta		1–0	1–1	0–0	1–0	0–1
D. Arica	0–0		1–0	2–1	0–3	1–1
Cobresal	1–0	4–0		4–1	1–1	1–1
Cobreloa	1–0	7–0	5–1		2–1	4–2
D. Iquique	0–1	3–1	0–3	1–3		3–4
R. Atacama	1–5	0–1	1–2	0–1	1–2	

Rank	Team	Points
1	Cobreloa	15
2	Cobresal	13
3	Deportes Antofagasta	11
4	Deportes Arica	8
5	Deportes Iquique	7
6	Regional Atacama	6

=== Group 2 ===
	EVER	COQU	DLSE	SWAN	ULCA	DOVA
Everton		1–1	3–1	3–2	0–0	1–1
Coquimbo U.	0–0		1–1	0–0	1–3	2–1
D. La Serena	2–2	1–1		3–1	3–1	4–0
S. Wanderers	3–1	0–0	2–0		5–1	1–0
U. La Calera	2–3	2–1	1–2	1–0		1–1
D. Ovalle	2–1	0–0	0–4	1–1	0–0	

Rank	Team	Points
1	Deportes La Serena	13
2	Santiago Wanderers	11 (+5)
3	Coquimbo Unido	11 (+2)
4	Everton	11 (+1)
5	Unión La Calera	7
6	Deportes Ovalle	6

=== Group 3 ===
	UESP	UCAT	SOIN	UCHI	USFE	CAND
U. Española		2–1	1–1	1–0	8–2	4–2
U. Católica	2–1		1–1	3–2	4–0	4–1
Soinca Bata	1–0	0–2		1–1	3–0	2–1
U. de Chile	0–1	0–3	1–1		3–1	1–1
U. San Felipe	3–1	1–4	4–1	1–3		2–1
Cobreandino	0–2	1–2	0–2	0–0	0–2	

Rank	Team	Points
1	Universidad Católica	17
2	Unión Española	13
3	Soinca Bata	12
4	Universidad de Chile	8
5	Unión San Felipe	8
6	Cobreandino	2

=== Group 4 ===
	PALE	COLO	MAGA	OHIG	AUDI	RANG
Palestino		2–0	3–1	2–3	2–1	1–0
Colo-Colo	2–1		0–1	2–0	5–0	5–1
Magallanes	1–2	1–3		1–1	1–0	0–3
O'Higgins	3–4	1–1	3–0		5–3	2–0
Audax I.	2–3	2–0	2–0	1–1		1–3
Rangers	0–3	1–2	3–0	2–3	2–1	

Rank	Team	Points
1	Palestino	16
2	Colo-Colo	13 (+10)
3	O'Higgins	13 (+6)
4	Rangers	8
5	Audax Italiano	5
6	Magallanes	5

=== Group 5 ===
	DCOL	DCON	ÑUBL	FVIA	LSCH	IBER
D. Colchagua		0–2	0–0	1–0	3–1	1–2
D. Concepción	3–1		3–0	2–1	2–1	5–0
Ñublense	2–0	1–0		0–0	2–2	0–0
Fernández Vial	3–0	1–3	1–1		2–0	1–2
Lota S.	2–2	2–2	1–2	1–2		5–1
Iberia	1–1	1–0	1–3	1–1	3–1	

Rank	Team	Points
1	Deportes Concepción	15
2	Ñublense	13
3	Iberia	11
4	Fernández Vial	9
5	Deportes Colchagua	8
6	Lota Schwager	5

=== Group 6 ===
	DLIN	HUAC	LOZA	DTEM	POSO	DPMO
D. Linares		1–1	2–0	0–0	1–1	3–0
Huachipato	1–0		1–1	3–2	1–0	0–1
Lozapenco	3–0	0–0		0–1	0–2	1–0
D. Temuco	2–0	3–1	6–1		1–1	2–1
P. Osorno	6–2	2–0	0–1	2–3		2–1
D. Puerto Montt	3–1	3–0	2–1	1–0	4–2	

Rank	Team	Points
1	Deportes Temuco	14
2	Deportes Puerto Montt	12
3	Provincial Osorno	10
4	Huachipato	9
5	Lozapenco	8
6	Deportes Linares	7

== Round of 16 ==
Team 1	Agg.	Team 2	1st leg	2nd leg
Cobresal	3–3 (5-6p)	Cobreloa	1–2	2–1
Deportes Antofagasta	0–2	Palestino	0–0	0–2
Deportes La Serena	1–1 (3-4p)	Coquimbo Unido	1–0	0–1
Santiago Wanderers	1–5	Colo-Colo	1–1	0–4
Unión Española	4–0	Deportes Temuco	3–0	1–0
Soinca Bata	2–6	Universidad Católica	2–2	0–4
Ñublense	1–3	O'Higgins	0–3	1–0
Deportes Puerto Montt	2–3	Deportes Concepción	1–2	1–1

== Quarterfinals ==
Team 1	Agg.	Team 2	1st leg	2nd leg
Cobreloa	4–3	Coquimbo Unido	3–0	1–3
Unión Española	1–1 (a)	Universidad Católica	1–1	0–0
O'Higgins	3–3 (a)	Deportes Concepción	1–1	2–2
Palestino	5–1	Colo-Colo	5–1	0–0

== Semifinals ==
October 23, 1991

O'Higgins	2 – 1	Cobreloa
De Luca 11'; Baroni 78'		44' (pen.) Figueroa

Estadio El Teniente, Rancagua
Attendance: 4,165
Referee: S. Imperatore

October 24, 1991

Palestino	1 – 1	Universidad Católica
Alvariño 25' (pen.)		12' Reinoso

Estadio Santa Laura, Santiago
Attendance: 2,029
Referee: C. Robles

October 30, 1991

Universidad Católica	1 – 1	Palestino
Reinoso 75'		71' Soto
Penalties
Contreras (penalty scored); Parraguez (penalty scored); Del Solar (penalty scored); Estay (penalty scored)	4 – 3	(penalty scored) Alvariño; (penalty missed) Lacroix; (penalty scored) Soto; (penalty scored) Jélvez; (penalty missed) Castañeda

Estadio San Carlos de Apoquindo, Santiago
Attendance: 4,025
Referee: I. Guerrero

November 6, 1991

Cobreloa	5 – 1	O'Higgins
Bustos 8'; Figueroa 25', 77'; Meléndez 31' (o.g.); Pino 78' (pen.)		29' Baroni

Estadio Municipal de Calama, Calama
Attendance: 2,279
Referee: V. Ojeda

== Final ==
November 13, 1991

Universidad Católica	1 – 0	Cobreloa
Percudani 28'

Estadio Nacional, Santiago
Attendance: 8,830
Referee: E. Marín

== Top goalscorer ==
- Gustavo De Luca (O'Higgins) 12 goals

== See also ==
- 1991 Campeonato Nacional
- Primera B
