= Elías Escalona =

Chilean footballer

Personal information
- Full name: Elías Mauricio Escalona Albornoz
- Date of birth: 22 November 1973 (age 52)
- Place of birth: Chile
- Position: Attacking midfielder

Youth career
- Huachipato

Senior career*
Years	Team	Apps	(Gls)
1992–1994	Huachipato		
1994–2000	Cortuluá		
1996	→ Huachipato (loan)	4	(0)
1998	→ Atlético Huila (loan)		
1998	→ Deportes Iquique (loan)	12	(0)
2000	→ Deportes Puerto Montt (loan)		
2001–2003	Deportes Talcahuano		

International career
1992	Chile U20		
- * Club domestic league appearances and goals

Elías Mauricio Escalona Albornoz (born 22 November 1973) is a Chilean former professional footballer who played as an attacking midfielder for clubs in Chile and Colombia.

== Career ==
A product of Huachipato youth system, he made appearances from 1992 to 1994.

In second half 1994, he moved to Colombia and joined Cortuluá in the top division with Reinaldo Rueda as coach. In the squad, he coincided with his compatriots Carlos Molina (1994–2000) and Fabián Campos (1996), who came from Huachipato.

He also had stints on loan at Huachipato (1996), Atlético Huila (1998), Deportes Iquique (1998) and Deportes Puerto Montt (2000).

In his last seasons, he played for Deportes Talcahuano and retired in 2003.

At international level, he represented Chile at under-20 level in the 1992 South American Championship, alongside successful players such as Marcelo Salas, Clarence Acuña and Francisco Rojas.

== Personal life ==
Escalona has worked in the administrative area of ASMAR, a Chilean state-owned shipbuilding company.
