= 1989 Campeonato Nacional Primera División =

Campeonato Nacional 1989
- Dates: 9 September 1989 – 11 February 1990
- Champions: Colo-Colo (16th title)
- Relegated: Deportes Valdivia; Rangers; Unión San Felipe (Play-off)
- 1990 Copa Libertadores: Colo-Colo; Universidad Católica (Liguilla winners)
- Matches: 240
- Goals: 606 (2.53 per match)
- Top goalscorer: Rubén Martínez (25 goals)
- Biggest home win: U. San Felipe 6–0 D. Valdivia (25 November); D. La Serena 6–0 D. Valdivia (16 December)
- Highest attendance: 76,118 Unión Española 0–2 Colo-Colo (7 January 1990)
- Total attendance: 1,420,750
- Average attendance: 5,919

The 1989 Campeonato Nacional, was the 57th season of top-flight football in Chile. Colo-Colo won its sixteenth title. Universidad Católica, as Liguilla winners, also qualified for the next Copa Libertadores.

== League table ==
Pos	Team	Pld	W	D	L	GF	GA	GD	Pts	Qualification or relegation
1	Colo-Colo	30	20	5	5	60	28	+32	45	Champions & qualified to 1990 Copa Libertadores
2	Universidad Católica	30	17	8	5	59	22	+37	42	Qualified to Liguilla Pre-Copa Libertadores
3	Cobreloa	30	16	7	7	52	27	+25	39	Qualified to Liguilla Pre-Copa Libertadores
4	Cobresal	30	13	10	7	50	31	+19	36	Qualified to Liguilla Pre-Copa Libertadores
5	Deportes La Serena	30	10	14	6	39	27	+12	34	Qualified to Liguilla Pre-Copa Libertadores
6	O'Higgins	30	9	13	8	37	29	+8	31	
7	Deportes Concepción	30	9	13	8	21	25	−4	31	
8	Unión Española	30	9	12	9	45	45	0	30	
9	Naval	30	8	12	10	31	39	−8	28	
10	Huachipato	30	9	10	11	25	37	−12	28	
11	Everton	30	9	10	11	26	40	−14	28	
12	Deportes Iquique	30	6	14	10	32	38	−6	26	
13	Fernández Vial	30	5	13	12	31	44	−13	23	
14	Unión San Felipe	30	7	9	14	43	61	−18	23	Promotion/relegation Liguilla
15	Rangers	30	7	7	16	34	48	−14	21	Relegated to Segunda División
16	Deportes Valdivia	30	3	9	18	21	65	−44	15	Relegated to Segunda División

Campeonato Nacional
1989 champions
Colo-Colo
16th title

== Results ==
Home \ Away	CLO	CSA	COL	DCO	EVE	FVI	HUA	DIQ	DLS	NAV	OHI	UCA	UES	USF	RAN	DVA
Cobreloa		5–1	2–1	0–0	3–1	1–0	2–0	1–0	2–1	3–1	1–0	3–2	2–2	4–0	5–1	4–0
Cobresal	0–0		1–2	2–0	0–1	2–0	3–1	3–1	5–0	5–0	1–1	0–0	3–1	2–2	2–0	4–1
Colo-Colo	3–1	1–1		0–0	3–1	6–2	2–0	2–1	1–2	4–1	1–3	0–0	1–5	4–0	1–0	4–1
Concepción	1–0	1–0	0–2		1–3	0–0	0–2	0–0	1–0	1–0	1–2	0–0	1–1	2–0	1–0	2–2
Everton	3–2	0–0	0–0	0–0		1–3	0–0	2–2	1–0	0–0	1–0	0–1	0–0	3–1	0–2	1–0
F. Vial	0–0	2–0	2–3	1–2	1–0		1–1	1–1	0–0	2–2	1–1	0–3	0–0	4–0	0–0	4–0
Huachipato	0–2	0–2	0–3	0–1	3–0	1–1		1–0	0–1	0–0	1–1	2–1	1–0	2–2	1–0	1–0
Iquique	1–1	0–0	0–1	0–0	3–1	1–1	1–1		2–0	1–1	0–0	1–0	2–0	1–4	3–1	2–0
La Serena	0–0	1–1	1–0	0–0	3–1	4–1	5–0	1–1		1–1	0–0	1–1	2–2	1–1	3–2	6–0
Naval	1–0	2–0	1–2	0–1	1–1	2–0	1–0	1–1	0–1		0–0	1–2	1–0	2–1	3–3	1–1
O'Higgins	3–1	1–1	0–2	1–1	1–1	1–0	1–2	3–2	0–0	3–0		1–1	1–2	4–0	0–0	2–0
U. Católica	2–0	3–0	1–3	2–1	6–1	6–1	0–0	5–0	1–0	2–1	3–0		2–2	3–0	5–1	2–0
U. Española	1–2	2–4	0–2	1–1	1–1	2–2	2–2	3–2	0–2	1–1	1–4	2–1		2–1	3–1	3–0
San Felipe	0–4	2–2	0–2	2–1	3–0	1–0	2–3	1–1	1–1	2–2	3–2	1–2	2–2		2–3	6–0
Rangers	0–0	1–2	2–4	3–0	0–1	2–0	3–0	1–1	1–1	0–2	1–0	0–0	1–2	0–1		3–1
Valdivia	2–1	0–3	0–0	1–1	0–1	1–1	0–0	2–1	1–1	1–2	1–1	0–2	0–2	2–2	4–2	

Legend: Blue = home team win; Yellow = draw; Red = away team win.

== Topscorer ==
Name	Team	Goals
(Chile) Rubén Martínez	Cobresal	25

== Liguilla Pre-Copa Libertadores ==
=== Semifinals ===
15 February 1990	Universidad Católica	3 – 0	Cobresal	San Carlos de Apoquindo, Santiago
	Barrera 9', 37'; Estay 24'			Attendance: 5,143; Referee: S. Imperatore

15 February 1990	Cobreloa	3 – 1	Deportes La Serena	Estadio Municipal, Calama
	Own-goal 8'; Czornomaz 21'; Álvarez 63'		De Luca 90'	Attendance: 4,868; Referee: I. Guerrero

18 February 1990	Cobresal	3 – 2 (a.e.t.)	Universidad Católica	Estadio El Cobre, El Salvador
	Matuszyczk 46', 57'; Bravo 65'		Romero 110'; Estay 114'	Attendance: 3,239; Referee: H. Silva

18 February 1990	Deportes La Serena	1 – 0	Cobreloa	Estadio La Portada, La Serena
	L. Contreras 73'			Attendance: 9,708; Referee: C. Robles

=== Final ===
21 February 1990	Universidad Católica	4 – 1	Cobreloa	Estadio Nacional, Santiago
	Olivarez 7', 76'; J. Contreras 73'; Tupper 90'		Tello 54'	Attendance: 21,384; Referee: H. Silva

Universidad Católica qualified for the 1989 Copa Libertadores

== Promotion/relegation Liguilla ==
14 February 1990	Santiago Wanderers	5 – 2	Magallanes	Estadio Sausalito, Viña del Mar
				Attendance: 10,680; Referee: J. Massardo

17 February 1990	Unión San Felipe	2 – 1	Magallanes	Estadio Sausalito, Viña del Mar
				Attendance: 2,359; Referee: I. Guerrero

20 February 1990	Santiago Wanderers	2 – 2	Unión San Felipe	Estadio Sausalito, Viña del Mar
				Attendance: 25,778; Referee: S. Imperatore

=== Promotion play-off match ===
24 February 1990	Santiago Wanderers	4 – 1 (a.e.t.)	Unión San Felipe	Estadio Sausalito, Viña del Mar
				Attendance: 17,809; Referee: H. Silva

- Santiago Wanderers promoted to Primera División

== See also ==
- 1989 Copa Digeder
- 1989 Copa Invierno
