= Carlos Molina (footballer) =

Chilean footballer

Personal information
- Full name: Carlos Mariano Molina Pino
- Date of birth: 23 October 1969 (age 57)
- Place of birth: Santiago, Chile
- Height: 1.75 m (5 ft 9 in)
- Position: Midfielder

Youth career
- Carlos Sarmiento
- Deportivo Cali
- Cúcuta Deportivo

Senior career*
Years	Team	Apps	(Gls)
1989–1990	Cúcuta Deportivo		
1991	Santa Fe	8	(3)
1991	Deportivo Cali		
1992	ULA		
1992	Deportes Quindío		
1993	Atlético Huila		
1994–2003	Cortuluá	18	(2)
2004–2005	América de Cali		

Managerial career
- América de Cali (youth)
- 2016: El Padrino
- * Club domestic league appearances and goals

Carlos Mariano Molina Pino (born 23 October 1969) is a Chilean former professional footballer who played as a midfielder for clubs in Colombia and Venezuela.

== Career ==
As a youth player, Molina was with Escuela Carlos Sarmiento and Deportivo Cali before moving Cúcuta Deportivo. In 1991, he played for Independiente Santa Fe, coinciding with his compatriot Juan Ramón Garrido, becoming the first Chileans to play for the club before Luis Ceballos, Mauricio Illesca and Julio Gutiérrez, returning to Deportivo Cali in the same year.

After a brief stint with Venezuelan side Universidad de Los Andes, he went on his career in Colombia playing for Deportes Quindío, Atlético Huila, Cortuluá and América de Cali.

A historical player of Cortuluá, where he coincided with his compatriot Elías Escalona some seasons, he took part in the 2002 Copa Libertadores after the team led the Torneo Apertura 2001.

As a player of América de Cali, he suffered a serious crisis after an arthroscopy.

Following his retirement, he worked for many years at the América de Cali youth ranks, and has after coached clubs such as Deportivo El Padrino from Cali.

== Personal life ==
Born in Santiago, Chile, Molina moved to Colombia at the age of two. All his family is Chilean and his father was a merchant ship captain.

Due to his origin, he is popularly known as El Chileno Molina (The Chilean Molina).

He has a close friendship with the coach Reinaldo Rueda, who coached him in Cortuluá.
