= Luis Ceballos (footballer) =

Chilean footballer and manager (born 1964)

Personal information
- Full name: Luis Avelino Ceballos Bustos
- Date of birth: 20 September 1964 (age 62)
- Place of birth: Lota, Chile
- Height: 1.76 m (5 ft 9 in)
- Position: Midfielder

Youth career
- Lota Schwager

Senior career*
Years	Team	Apps	(Gls)
1984–1986	Lota Schwager		
1987	Fernández Vial		
1988	Cobreloa	5	(0)
1989–1991	Fernández Vial		
1992–1993	O'Higgins		
1994	Colo-Colo	5	(1)
1994	Santa Fe	14	(1)
1995–1996	Universidad Católica		
1997–1998	Deportes La Serena		
1999–2002	Huachipato		
2003	Everton		
2004	Fernández Vial		

International career
1987	Chile B		

Managerial career
- 2005: Fernández Vial
- Naval
- Lota Schwager (youth)
- 2020: Malleco Unido
- 2023: Fernández Vial (women)
- Selección Lota
- Selección Coronel
Medal record
Men's football
Representing Chile
Pan American Games
Silver medal – second place	1987 Indianapolis	Team
- * Club domestic league appearances and goals

Luis Avelino Ceballos Bustos (born 20 September 1964) is a Chilean former professional footballer who played as a midfielder and manager.

== Club career ==
With an extensive career in Chilean football, in the Chilean Primera División Ceballos played for Fernández Vial, Cobreloa, O'Higgins, Colo-Colo, Universidad Católica, Deportes La Serena and Huachipato. In the Primera B de Chile, he played for Lota Schwager, Everton and Fernández Vial, where he retired.

He also had a stint with Colombian club Independiente Santa Fe in 1994, becoming the third Chilean to play for the club after Carlos Molina and Juan Ramón Garrido.

He won league titles along with Lota Schwager (1986, Segunda División), Cobreloa (1988, Primera División), and Everton (2003, Primera B). In addition he won the Copa Chile along with Colo-Colo (1994) and Universidad Católica (1995).

== International career ==
Ceballos represented Chile in the 1987 Pan American Games, winning the silver medal.

== Coaching career ==
He has coached Fernández Vial and Naval in the Primera B de Chile. In 2020, he assumed as coach of Malleco Unido in the Chilean Tercera B.

He also has worked with youth players in both the Lota Schwager youth system and his football academy in his city of birth.

In April 2023, he assumed as coach of the Fernández Vial women's team. The next years, he led the teams of both Lota and Coronel.

== Personal life ==
His younger brother, Sergio, is also a former footballer who played for Universidad de Chile while he was a player of Colo-Colo, the traditional rival.

He served as councillor of his city of birth, Lota from 2012 to 2016. In 2016 he was a mayoral candidate for the same city, as member of Amplitude party, but he wasn't elected.

== Honours ==
Lota Schwager

- Segunda División: 1986

Cobreloa

- Primera División: 1988

Colo-Colo

- Copa Chile: 1994

Universidad Católica

- Copa Chile: 1995

Everton

- Primera B: 2003

Chile B

- Pan American Games Silver medal: 1987
