= 1993 Copa Libertadores =

34th season of Copa Libertadores

1993 Copa Libertadores de América
Tournament details
- Dates: February 5 – May 26
- Teams: 21 (from 10 associations)

Final positions
- Champions: (Brazil) São Paulo (2nd title)
- Runners-up: (Chile) Universidad Católica

Tournament statistics
- Matches played: 90
- Goals scored: 248 (2.76 per match)
- Top scorer: (Argentina) Juan Carlos Almada (9 Goals)

The Copa Libertadores 1993 was the 34th edition of the Copa Libertadores, CONMEBOL's annual international club tournament. São Paulo won the competition.

== Qualified teams ==
Association	Team (berth)	Qualification method
(Argentina) Argentina; 2 berths	River Plate	1992 Copa Libertadores qualification winner
(Argentina) Argentina; 2 berths	Newell's Old Boys	1992 Copa Libertadores qualification runner-up
(Bolivia) Bolivia; 2 berths	Bolívar	1992 Primera División champion
(Bolivia) Bolivia; 2 berths	San José	1992 Primera División runner-up
(Brazil) Brazil; 3 berths	São Paulo	1992 Copa Libertadores champion
(Brazil) Brazil; 3 berths	Flamengo	1992 Série A champion
(Brazil) Brazil; 3 berths	Internacional	1992 Copa do Brasil champion
(Chile) Chile; 2 berths	Cobreloa	1992 Primera División champion
(Chile) Chile; 2 berths	Universidad Católica	1992 Liguilla Pre-Copa Libertadores winner
(Colombia) Colombia; 2 berths	América de Cali	1992 Categoría Primera A champion
(Colombia) Colombia; 2 berths	Atlético Nacional	1992 Categoría Primera A runner-up
(Ecuador) Ecuador; 2 berths	El Nacional	1992 Serie A champion
(Ecuador) Ecuador; 2 berths	Barcelona	1992 Serie A runner-up
(Paraguay) Paraguay; 2 berths	Cerro Porteño	1992 Primera División champion
(Paraguay) Paraguay; 2 berths	Olimpia	1992 Copa Libertadores Play-offs winner
(Peru) Peru; 2 berths	Universitario	1992 Descentralizado champion
(Peru) Peru; 2 berths	Sporting Cristal	1992 Liguilla Pre-Libertadores winner
(Uruguay) Uruguay; 2 berths	Nacional	1992 Liguilla Pre-Libertadores winner
(Uruguay) Uruguay; 2 berths	Bella Vista	1992 Liguilla Pre-Libertadores runner-up
(Venezuela) Venezuela; 2 berths	Caracas	1991–92 Primera División champion
(Venezuela) Venezuela; 2 berths	Minervén	1991–92 Primera División runner-up

== Draw ==
The champions and runners-up of each football association were drawn into the same group along with another football association's participating teams. Three clubs from Brazil competed as São Paulo was champion of the 1992 Copa Libertadores. They entered the tournament in the Round of 16.

Group 1	Group 2	Group 3	Group 4	Group 5
Peru; Venezuela	Bolivia; Chile	Ecuador; Uruguay	Brazil; Colombia	Argentina; Paraguay

== Group stage ==
=== Group 1 ===
Pos	Team	Pld	W	D	L	GF	GA	GD	Pts	Qualification
1	(Peru) Universitario	6	3	3	0	14	7	+7	9	Round of 16
2	(Peru) Sporting Cristal	6	3	1	2	13	9	+4	7	Round of 16
3	(Venezuela) Minervén	6	1	2	3	6	12	−6	4 (Note: Play-off match: Minervén 1–0 Caracas.)	Round of 16
4	(Venezuela) Caracas	6	1	2	3	5	10	−5	4	

=== Group 2 ===
Pos	Team	Pld	W	D	L	GF	GA	GD	Pts	Qualification
1	(Chile) Universidad Católica	6	3	2	1	15	8	+7	8	Round of 16
2	(Bolivia) Bolívar	6	3	1	2	10	7	+3	7	Round of 16
3	(Chile) Cobreloa	6	2	3	1	8	9	−1	7	Round of 16
4	(Bolivia) San José	6	1	0	5	8	17	−9	2	

=== Group 3 ===
Pos	Team	Pld	W	D	L	GF	GA	GD	Pts	Qualification
1	(Uruguay) Nacional	6	3	2	1	12	6	+6	8	Round of 16
2	(Ecuador) El Nacional	6	3	0	3	9	11	−2	6	Round of 16
3	(Ecuador) Barcelona	6	2	1	3	8	7	+1	5	Round of 16
4	(Uruguay) Bella Vista	6	2	1	3	6	11	−5	5	

=== Group 4 ===
Pos	Team	Pld	W	D	L	GF	GA	GD	Pts	Qualification
1	(Brazil) Flamengo	6	3	1	2	9	7	+2	7	Round of 16
2	(Colombia) América de Cali	6	3	1	2	12	11	+1	7 (Note: Play-off match: Atlético Nacional 2–4 América de Cali.)	Round of 16
3	(Colombia) Atlético Nacional	6	3	1	2	8	6	+2	7	Round of 16
4	(Brazil) Internacional	6	0	3	3	4	9	−5	3	

=== Group 5 ===
Pos	Team	Pld	W	D	L	GF	GA	GD	Pts	Qualification
1	(Paraguay) Cerro Porteño	6	2	3	1	5	4	+1	7	Round of 16
2	(Argentina) Newell's Old Boys	6	1	4	1	4	4	0	6 (Note: Away goals scored: Newell's Old Boys 2, Olimpia 1.)	Round of 16
3	(Paraguay) Olimpia	6	1	4	1	4	4	0	6	Round of 16
4	(Argentina) River Plate	6	1	3	2	4	5	−1	5	

== Knockout stages ==
=== Bracket ===
Round of 16
(Colombia) Atlético Nacional	0	2	2
(Chile) Universidad Católica	2	1	3
(Ecuador) Barcelona	1	3	4
(Peru) Universitario	2	0	2
(Peru) Sporting Cristal	0	4	4
(Ecuador) El Nacional	3	0	3
(Bolivia) Bolívar	1	1	2
(Colombia) América de Cali	2	1	3
(Chile) Cobreloa	1	0	1
(Paraguay) Cerro Porteño	1	2	3
(Paraguay) Olimpia	2	3	5
(Uruguay) Nacional	1	0	1
(Venezuela) Minervén	2	0	2
(Brazil) Flamengo	8	1	9
(Brazil) São Paulo	0	4	4
(Argentina) Newell's Old Boys	2	0	2

Quarterfinals
(Chile) Universidad Católica	3	1	4
(Ecuador) Barcelona	1	0	1
(Peru) Sporting Cristal	2	2	4
(Colombia) América de Cali	2	3	5
(Paraguay) Cerro Porteño (p)	1	0	1 (4)
(Paraguay) Olimpia	1	0	1 (2)
(Brazil) Flamengo	1	0	1
(Brazil) São Paulo	1	2	3

Semifinals
(Chile) Universidad Católica	1	2	3
(Colombia) América de Cali	0	2	2
(Paraguay) Cerro Porteño	0	0	0
(Brazil) São Paulo	1	0	1

Finals
(Chile) Universidad Católica	1	2	3
(Brazil) São Paulo	5	0	5

== Finals ==
19 May 1993	São Paulo (Brazil)	5–1	(Chile) Universidad Católica	Estádio do Morumbi, São Paulo
	López 30' (o.g.); Vítor 40'; Gilmar 54'; Raí 60'; Müller 65'		Almada 85' (pen.)	Attendance: 100,000; Referee: Torres (COL)

26 May 1993	Universidad Católica (Chile)	2–0	(Brazil) São Paulo	Estadio Nacional, Santiago
	Lunari 9'; Almada 15' (pen.)			Attendance: 50,000; Referee: Escobar (PAR)

Copa Libertadores
1993 Winner

São Paulo
Second Title
