= 1989 Campeonato Nacional Segunda División =

Segunda División
- Season: 1989
- Champions: Universidad de Chile
- Promoted: Universidad de Chile; Palestino; Santiago Wanderers
- Relegated: Unión La Calera

The 1989 Segunda División de Chile was the 38th season of the Segunda División de Chile.

Universidad de Chile was the tournament's champion.

== Aggregate table ==
=== North Zone ===
Pos	Team	Pld	W	D	L	GF	GA	GD	Pts	Qualification
1	Santiago Wanderers	22	11	5	6	28	19	+9	27	Qualified to North Zone - Promotion Playoffs
2	Coquimbo Unido	22	8	9	5	21	19	+2	25	Qualified to North Zone - Promotion Playoffs
3	Palestino	22	8	8	6	35	23	+12	24	Qualified to North Zone - Promotion Playoffs
4	Deportes Ovalle	22	9	6	7	26	25	+1	24	Qualified to North Zone - Promotion Playoffs
5	Regional Atacama	22	8	8	6	30	31	−1	24	Qualified to North Zone - Promotion Playoffs
6	Deportes Antofagasta	22	9	5	8	36	28	+8	23	Qualified to North Zone - Promotion Playoffs
7	Cobreandino	22	10	3	9	28	31	−3	23	Qualified to North Zone - Relegation Playoffs
8	San Luis de Quillota	22	7	7	8	24	24	0	21	Qualified to North Zone - Relegation Playoffs
9	Soinca Bata	22	8	5	9	26	28	−2	21	Qualified to North Zone - Relegation Playoffs
10	Audax Italiano	22	7	4	11	24	31	−7	18	Qualified to North Zone - Relegation Playoffs
11	Unión La Calera	22	6	6	10	23	33	−10	18	Qualified to North Zone - Relegation Playoffs
12	Deportes Arica	22	7	2	13	28	37	−9	16	Qualified to North Zone - Relegation Playoffs

Source: globalsportsarchive.com

=== South Zone ===
Pos	Team	Pld	W	D	L	GF	GA	GD	Pts	Qualification
1	Universidad de Chile	22	11	8	3	36	20	+16	30	Qualified to South Zone - Promotion Playoffs
2	Magallanes	22	11	6	5	24	14	+10	28	Qualified to South Zone - Promotion Playoffs
3	Provincial Osorno	22	8	10	4	28	20	+8	26	Qualified to South Zone - Promotion Playoffs
4	Iberia	22	8	8	6	24	25	−1	24	Qualified to South Zone - Promotion Playoffs
5	Deportes Puerto Montt	22	7	8	7	22	21	+1	22	Qualified to South Zone - Promotion Playoffs
6	Curicó Unido	22	6	9	7	24	25	−1	21	Qualified to South Zone - Promotion Playoffs
7	Lota Schwager	22	7	7	8	16	26	−10	21	Qualified to South Zone - Relegation Playoffs
8	Deportes Temuco	22	6	8	8	26	27	−1	20	Qualified to South Zone - Relegation Playoffs
9	Deportes Linares	22	4	12	6	16	20	−4	20	Qualified to South Zone - Relegation Playoffs
10	General Velásquez	22	5	8	9	21	30	−9	18	Qualified to South Zone - Relegation Playoffs
11	Ñublense	22	6	5	11	21	23	−2	17	Qualified to South Zone - Relegation Playoffs
12	Deportes Colchagua	22	4	9	9	16	23	−7	17	Qualified to South Zone - Relegation Playoffs

Source: globalsportsarchive.com

== Final stage ==
=== North Zone - Promotion Playoffs ===
Pos	Team	Pld	W	D	L	GF	GA	GD	BP	Pts	Promotion or qualification
1	Palestino	10	5	4	1	23	11	+12	24	38	Final por el Campeonato. Asciende a Primera División.
2	Santiago Wanderers	10	3	4	3	8	13	−5	27	37	Clasificó a la Liguilla de Promoción
3	Deportes Ovalle	10	3	4	3	10	10	0	24	34	
4	Coquimbo Unido	10	3	3	4	11	13	−2	25	34	
5	Deportes Antofagasta	10	4	2	4	12	13	−1	23	33	
6	Regional Atacama	10	3	1	6	12	16	−4	24	31	

Source: globalsportsarchive.com

=== North Zone - Relegation Playoffs ===
Pos	Team	Pld	W	D	L	GF	GA	GD	BP	Pts	Qualification
1	Cobreandino	10	4	2	4	13	10	+3	23	33	
2	San Luis de Quillota	10	3	3	4	11	11	0	21	30	
3	Soinca Bata	10	2	5	3	8	13	−5	21	30	
4	Deportes Arica	10	5	3	2	16	13	+3	16	29	
5	Audax Italiano	10	4	3	3	14	12	+2	18	29	
6	Unión La Calera	10	3	2	5	12	15	−3	18	26	Juega Definición Descenso

Source: globalsportsarchive.com

=== South Zone - Promotion Playoffs ===
Pos	Team	Pld	W	D	L	GF	GA	GD	BP	Pts	Promotion or qualification
1	Universidad de Chile	10	6	2	2	13	5	+8	30	44	Promoted to 1990 Primera División de Chile
2	Magallanes	10	3	4	3	14	10	+4	28	38	Qualified to Promotion Playoffs
3	Provincial Osorno	10	4	2	4	11	12	−1	26	36	
4	Iberia	10	5	1	4	13	14	−1	24	35	
5	Curicó Unido	10	3	3	4	7	11	−4	21	30	
6	Deportes Puerto Montt	10	2	2	6	9	15	−6	22	28	

Source: globalsportsarchive.com

=== Liguilla de Descenso Sur ===
Pos	Team	Pld	W	D	L	GF	GA	GD	BP	Pts	Qualification
1	Lota Schwager	10	4	5	1	14	9	+5	21	34	
2	Deportes Temuco	10	2	5	3	11	11	0	20	29	
3	Deportes Linares	10	3	3	4	9	13	−4	20	29	
4	Deportes Colchagua	10	3	5	2	10	8	+2	17	28	
5	Ñublense	10	3	4	3	7	7	0	17	27	
6	General Velásquez	10	1	6	3	5	8	−3	18	26	Qualiified to Relegation Playoffs

Source: globalsportsarchive.com

== See also ==
- Chilean football league system
