= 1991 Campeonato Nacional Primera División =

Football season in Chile

Campeonato Nacional 1991
- Dates: 27 April – 22 December 1991
- Champions: Colo-Colo (18th title)
- Relegated: Provincial Osorno; Santiago Wanderers
- 1992 Copa Libertadores: Colo-Colo; Coquimbo Unido; Universidad Católica (Liguilla winners)
- 1992 Copa CONMEBOL: O'Higgins (Liguilla 2nd place)
- Matches: 240
- Goals: 658 (2.74 per match)
- Top goalscorer: Rubén Martínez (23 goals)
- Biggest home win: Cobresal 8–1 Provincial Osorno (1 December)
- Highest attendance: 59,610 Universidad Católica 0–2 Colo-Colo (20 October)
- Total attendance: 1,759,454
- Average attendance: 7,331

The 1991 Campeonato Nacional, was the 59th season of top-flight football in Chile. Colo-Colo won its eighteenth title following a 0–0 away draw against Coquimbo Unido on 18 December. Coquimbo Unido, as runner-up, and Universidad Católica, as Liguilla winners, also qualified for the next Copa Libertadores .

== Final table ==
Pos	Team	Pld	W	D	L	GF	GA	GD	Pts	Qualification or relegation
1	Colo-Colo	30	18	8	4	57	25	+32	44	Champions and qualified for the 1992 Copa Libertadores
2	Coquimbo Unido	30	15	9	6	41	31	+10	39	Qualified for the 1992 Copa Libertadores
3	Universidad Católica	30	16	6	8	54	38	+16	38	Qualified for the Liguilla Pre-Copa Libertadores
4	O'Higgins	30	15	7	8	50	33	+17	37	Qualified for the Liguilla Pre-Copa Libertadores
5	Fernández Vial	30	13	6	11	28	33	−5	32	Qualified for the Liguilla Pre-Copa Libertadores
6	Cobreloa	30	13	5	12	57	40	+17	31	Qualified for the Liguilla Pre-Copa Libertadores
7	Deportes Concepción	30	11	9	10	43	49	−6	31	Qualified for the Liguilla Pre-Copa Libertadores
8	Deportes Antofagasta	32	8	13	11	22	24	−2	29	Qualified for the Liguilla Pre-Copa Libertadores
9	Palestino	30	7	15	8	39	43	−4	29	
10	Deportes La Serena	30	11	6	13	42	56	−14	28	
11	Cobresal	30	8	11	11	43	35	+8	27	
12	Unión Española	30	10	7	13	50	49	+1	27	
13	Everton	30	10	7	13	35	39	−4	27	Promotion/relegation Liguilla
14	Universidad de Chile	30	7	9	14	36	39	−3	23	Promotion/relegation Liguilla
15	Provincial Osorno	30	5	9	16	35	66	−31	19	Relegated to Segunda División
16	Santiago Wanderers	30	3	13	14	26	58	−32	19	Relegated to Segunda División

Source: Solofutbol.cl

== Results ==
Home \ Away	DAN	CLO	CSA	COL	DCO	COQ	EVE	FVI	DLS	OHI	POS	PAL	UCA	UCH	UES	SWA
Antofagasta		1–0	0–0	0–0	0–1	3–0	2–1	1–0	1–2	1–0	1–1	0–0	0–0	0–0	1–0	1–1
Cobreloa	3–1		1–1	2–0	3–0	4–0	3–1	0–1	6–2	2–3	3–0	3–1	2–2	1–0	3–1	3–0
Cobresal	0–2	0–2		1–3	4–1	0–0	2–1	2–0	1–1	2–1	8–1	0–0	1–1	0–1	0–1	4–0
Colo-Colo	1–0	4–2	3–1		1–2	0–0	2–1	4–2	3–1	1–1	2–2	1–1	4–1	2–0	4–1	2–0
Concepción	0–0	1–0	1–1	1–1		0–1	4–2	1–2	4–2	1–0	4–0	1–1	2–2	0–1	4–2	0–0
Coquimbo	2–1	3–0	2–0	0–0	1–1		1–0	0–1	3–0	2–0	4–0	0–0	1–0	1–0	2–1	3–3
Everton	0–0	2–1	1–1	1–0	4–0	2–0		0–1	1–0	0–4	1–0	1–1	1–2	1–0	1–1	4–0
F.Vial	1–0	2–2	1–0	0–1	1–2	0–1	3–2		2–1	2–1	1–0	0–0	1–2	2–1	1–0	0–0
La Serena	0–0	1–0	1–0	1–5	2–2	0–1	2–2	2–0		1–0	3–1	5–6	0–2	1–1	2–0	3–1
O'Higgins	3–1	1–1	1–1	1–0	4–2	1–3	2–1	3–1	2–0		2–1	3–1	2–2	1–1	3–1	3–0
Osorno	2–2	1–4	1–1	2–2	2–1	0–0	1–2	1–1	3–1	2–0		0–0	2–0	3–2	2–4	1–1
Palestino	0–0	3–1	2–2	0–1	1–2	2–1	0–0	4–0	0–2	2–2	4–2		0–1	1–1	0–0	3–1
U. Católica	3–0	1–0	3–2	0–2	5–1	1–2	3–0	0–1	0–1	0–0	2–1	3–1		5–2	2–1	6–1
U. Chile	1–1	2–2	1–2	0–2	0–1	4–1	0–2	1–0	0–0	0–1	5–1	6–0	2–3		1–0	2–2
U. Española	0–1	4–2	2–1	1–5	3–0	2–2	3–0	1–1	7–2	0–2	3–2	4–4	4–0	3–1		0–0
S. Wanderers	2–1	1–0	0–5	0–1	3–3	4–4	0–0	0–0	2–3	1–3	2–0	0–1	1–2	0–0	0–0	

Source: Solofutbol.cl
Legend: Blue = home team win; Yellow = draw; Red = away team win.

== Topscorers ==
Pos	Name	Team	Goals
1	(Chile) Rubén Martínez	Colo Colo	23
2	(Chile) Aníbal González	Unión Española	22
3	(Argentina) Gustavo De Luca	O'Higgins	21
	(Argentina) Juan Carlos Almada	Deportes Concepción	21
	(Chile) Marco Antonio Figueroa	Cobreloa	21

== Title ==
Campeonato Nacional de Chile
1991 champion
Colo-Colo
18th title

== Liguilla Pre-Copa Libertadores ==
=== Preliminary round ===
Team 1	Agg.	Team 2	1st leg	2nd leg
Deportes Concepción	3–2	Fernández Vial	1–0	2–2
O'Higgins	2–1	Universidad Católica*	1–0	1–1
Deportes Antofagasta	3–1	Cobreloa	0–0	3–1

* Qualified as "Best Loser"

2 January 1992	O'Higgins	1 – 0	Deportes Antofagasta	Estadio Nacional, Santiago
	De Luca 69' (pen.)			Attendance: 18,022; Referee: I. Guerrero

2 January 1992	Universidad Católica	3 – 1	Deportes Concepción	Estadio Nacional, Santiago
	Contreras 40'; Tupper 67'; Reinoso 76'		86' J. Pérez	Attendance: 18,022; Referee: H. Silva

4 January 1992	O'Higgins	1 – 1	Deportes Concepción	Estadio Nacional, Santiago
	Baroni 60'		76' R. Castillo	Attendance: 18,841; Referee: E. Marín

4 January 1992	Universidad Católica	3 – 1	Deportes Antofagasta	Estadio Nacional, Santiago
	Contreras 19'; Reinoso 70'; Barrera 87'		34' S. Olivera	Attendance: 18,841; Referee: S. Imperatore

6 January 1992	Deportes Antofagasta	2 – 0	Deportes Concepción	Estadio Nacional, Santiago
	Letelier 38'; Salgado 69'			Attendance: 27,686; Referee: V. Ojeda

6 January 1992	Universidad Católica	2 – 0	O'Higgins	Estadio Nacional, Santiago
	Contreras 22'; Reinoso 84'			Attendance: 27,686; Referee: S. Imperatore

Universidad Católica also qualified for the 1992 Copa Libertadores

== Promotion/relegation Liguilla ==
26 December 1991	Everton	2 – 1	Deportes Puerto Montt	Estadio Nacional, Santiago
	Baeza; Cofré		Casas

26 December 1991	Universidad de Chile	3 – 0	Soinca Bata	Estadio Nacional, Santiago
	Arancibia; Torres; Puyol

28 December 1991	Soinca Bata	0 – 0	Everton	Estadio Nacional, Santiago

28 December 1991	Universidad de Chile	4 – 0	Deportes Puerto Montt	Estadio Nacional, Santiago
	Morales; Mora; Arancibia; Torres

30 December 1991	Soinca Bata	4 – 0	Deportes Puerto Montt	Estadio Nacional, Santiago
	Fabbiani; Puga; Cueto

30 December 1991	Universidad de Chile	0 – 2	Everton	Estadio Nacional, Santiago
			Cofré; Guarda

Everton and Universidad de Chile will play in the 1992 Primera División

== See also ==
- 1991 Copa Chile

== Sources ==
- RSSSF Page
- "CAMPEONATO NACIONAL 1991". solofutbol.cl (in Spanish). Archived from the original on May 3, 2019.
