= Fabián Estay =

Chilean footballer (born 1968)

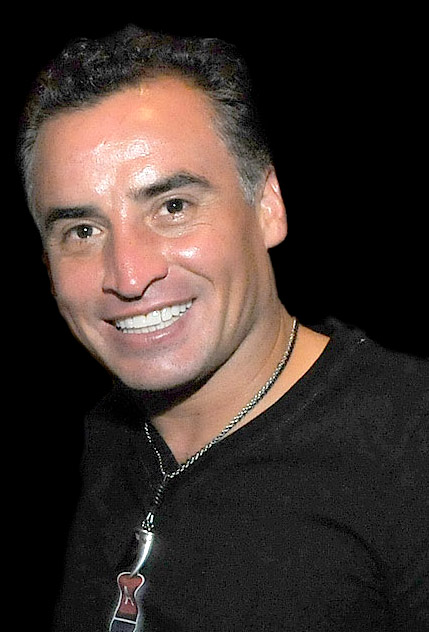

Personal information
- Full name: Fabián Raphael Estay Silva
- Date of birth: October 5, 1968 (age 58)
- Place of birth: Santiago, Chile
- Height: 1.73 m (5 ft 8 in)
- Position: Midfielder

Youth career
- 1985–1987: Universidad Católica

Senior career*
Years	Team	Apps	(Gls)
1987–1991	Universidad Católica	111	(11)
1991–1993	St. Gallen	35	(8)
1993	Universidad de Chile	39	(2)
1993–1995	Olympiacos	20	(4)
1995–1996	Colo-Colo	32	(7)
1996–1999	Toluca	140	(23)
1999–2001	América	82	(11)
2001–2003	Atlante	57	(6)
2003	Santos Laguna	20	(2)
2004	Acapulco	11	(1)
2004–2005	Toluca	12	(1)
2005	América de Cali	14	(2)
2006	Palestino	32	(4)
Total		605	(82)

International career
1987	Chile U20	6	(0)
1990–2001	Chile	69	(5)
- * Club domestic league appearances and goals

Fabián Raphael Estay Silva (born October 5, 1968) is a Chilean former professional footballer who played as a midfielder.

== Career ==
Estay played for club sides in Chile, Switzerland, Greece, Mexico and Colombia.

At international level, he represented Chile at under-20 level in both the 1987 South American Championship and the 1987 FIFA World Youth Championship, where Chile reached the fourth place.

At senior level, he was capped 69 times and scored five goals for the Chile national team between 1990 and 2001, including four games at the 1998 FIFA World Cup. Estay made his debut for the senior national squad on October 17, 1990, in a friendly against Brazil.

== Personal life ==
Estay has a long-term close friendship with the former fellow footballer Iván Zamorano, what interrupted from 2001 to 2007 due to the fact that Estay stated that Zamorano didn't support him when he was isolated from the América first team by the club leaders. In addition, Zamorano is the godfather of the Estay's daughter, Renata Ivana.

He naturalized Mexican by residence in 2005 and later he made his home in Mexico, working as a football commentator for media such as Fox Sports México.

In 2008, Estay competed in the second season of the Chilean TV program Estrellas en el Hielo: El Baile (Stars on ice: The dance) from TVN.

== Career statistics ==
International Goals
#	Date	Venue	Opponent	Score	Result	Competition
1.	May 22, 1991	Dublin, Ireland	Republic of Ireland	0–1	1–1	Friendly
2.	July 14, 1991	Santiago	Paraguay	3–0	4–0	1991 Copa América
3.	March 31, 1993	Arica, Chile	Bolivia	1–0	2–1	Friendly
4.	July 6, 1996	Santiago	Ecuador	3–1	4–1	1998 World Cup Qualifier
5.	August 15, 2000	Santiago	Brazil	1–0	3–0	2002 World Cup Qualifier

== Honours ==
Universidad Católica

- Primera División de Chile: 1987
- Copa Chile: 1991

Toluca

- Mexican Primera División: Verano 1998, Verano 1999

Chile

- Copa Expedito Teixeira: 1990
- Canada Cup: 1995

Individual

- Mexican Primera División Golden Ball: Winter 1997, Verano 1998, Verano 1999
- Soccer Hall of Fame: 2026
