= Juan Alvariño =

Argentine footballer

Personal information
- Full name: Juan Fulgencio Alvariño
- Date of birth: 18 December 1966 (age 59)
- Place of birth: Buenos Aires, Argentina
- Position: Defender

Senior career*
Years	Team	Apps	(Gls)
1986–1990	Deportivo Laferrere	72	(1)
1990–1992	Palestino	77	(5)
1993	O'Higgins	18	(0)
1994	Cobresal	10	(0)
1994–1995	Deportivo Laferrere	38	(2)
1995–1996	Atlanta	52	(6)
1997	Club Atlético Belgrano	19	(1)
1997–1998	Los Andes	19	(0)
1999–2000	Juventud Antoniana	30	(4)
2001–2002	Juventud Alianza		
2002–2003	Deportivo Laferrere	29	(1)
2003	JJ Urquiza	6	(0)
Medal record
First place	Primera C Metropolitana	1987
- * Club domestic league appearances and goals

Juan Alvariño (born 18 December 1966) is an Argentine former footballer who played as a defender for clubs from Argentina and Chile.

== Career ==
In Chile, Alvariño played for Palestino, O'Higgins and Cobresal in the Primera División.
