= Aníbal González (footballer, born 1995) =

Mexican-Chilean footballer

Personal information
- Full name: Aníbal Gerson González Ramírez
- Date of birth: 8 April 1995 (age 31)
- Place of birth: Monterrey, Mexico
- Position: Striker

Youth career
- O'Higgins

Senior career*
Years	Team	Apps	(Gls)
2013–2014	O'Higgins	1	(0)
2015	Colo-Colo	0	(0)
- * Club domestic league appearances and goals

Aníbal Gerson González Ramírez (born 8 April 1995) is a Mexican former footballer who played as a striker.

== Personal life ==
He is the son of the top-goalscorer of O'Higgins, Aníbal González and was born when his father played for Monterrey.
