= Guillermo Carreño =

Chilean footballer (born 1962)

Personal information
- Full name: Guillermo Gerardo Carreño Matamala
- Date of birth: 6 February 1962 (age 64)
- Place of birth: Santiago, Chile
- Height: 1.69 m (5 ft 7 in)
- Position: Midfielder

Senior career*
Years	Team	Apps	(Gls)
1980–1983	Unión Española		
1984	Cobreandino		
1985–1988	Deportes Iquique		
1989–1990	Colo-Colo		
1991–1993	O'Higgins		
1994–1995	Deportes Iquique	3	(0)
1996	Unión Santa Cruz	1	(0)

International career
1983	Chile Pan American		
1989	Chile	2	(0)

Managerial career
- Deportes Iquique (youth)
- 2014: Deportes Iquique (assistant)
- 2021: Deportes Iquique (women)
- 2022: Deportes Iquique (assistant)
- 2023–2024: Deportes Iquique (women)
- * Club domestic league appearances and goals

Guillermo Gerardo Carreño Matamala (born 6 February 1962) is a Chilean former professional footballer who played as a midfielder.

== Club career ==
In 1984, Carreño was on loan to Cobreandino. In the years 1985 to 1988 in Iquique, where it reached its greatest footballing expression.

Hires Colo-Colo in 1989, wearing the dawn shirt until 1990 and the "cacique" won the National Tournament in 1989 and 1990 and Chile Glass of them years. In 1991, he played in O'Higgins of Rancagua, where he played until 1993, when he retired.

- Unión Española 1980–1983
- Cobreandino 1984
- Deportes Iquique 1985–1988
- Colo-Colo 1989–1990
- O'Higgins 1991–1993
- Deportes Iquique 1994–1995
- Unión Santa Cruz 1996

== International career ==
Carreño played for the youth team of Chile. In 1983, he joined the senior national team, which competed in the IX Pan American Games in Caracas, Venezuela. He was also selected adult 1988 and 1989. Records in its statistical two games.

== Coaching career ==
Carreño worked as coach for Deportes Iquique and led the women's team in 2023 and 2024.

== Honours ==
Colo-Colo

- Chilean Primera División: 1989, 1990
- Copa Chile: 1989, 1990
