= Juan Carlos González (Chilean footballer) =

Chilean footballer (born 1968)

Personal information
- Full name: Juan Carlos González Izurieta
- Date of birth: 13 November 1968 (age 57)
- Place of birth: Santiago, Chile
- Height: 1.78 m (5 ft 10 in)
- Position: Defender

Senior career*
Years	Team	Apps	(Gls)
1990–1995	Unión Española		
1996–2001	Colo-Colo		

International career
1993–1997	Chile	10	(0)
- * Club domestic league appearances and goals as of 21 March 2020

Juan Carlos González Izurieta (born 13 November 1968) is a former Chilean footballer who played for Unión Española and Colo-Colo. He played as a defender.

== Honours ==
=== Player ===
Unión Española

- Copa Chile (2): 1992, 1993

Colo-Colo

- Primera División de Chile (3): 1996, 1997 Clausura, 1998
- Copa Chile (1): 1996
