= Luis Pérez (footballer, born 1965) =

Chilean footballer and manager

Personal information
- Full name: Luis Hernán Pérez Ramírez
- Date of birth: 17 April 1964 (age 62)
- Place of birth: Santiago, Chile
- Height: 1.67 m (5 ft 6 in)
- Position: Midfielder

Team information
- Current team: Colo-Colo (youth manager)

Youth career
- Magallanes

Senior career*
Years	Team	Apps	(Gls)
1983–1984	Magallanes	56	(10)
1985–1992	Universidad Católica	197	(37)
1991	→ Colo-Colo (loan)	20	(6)
1994–1996	Morelia	43	(6)
1995	→ Deportes Temuco (loan)	18	(1)
1996–1998	Universidad Católica	54	(6)
1999	Santiago Morning	39	(11)
2000	Palestino	23	(2)
2001	Deportes Melipilla	13	(0)
Total		463	(79)

International career
1984	Chile Olympic		
1989–1996	Chile	6	(0)

Managerial career
- 2003–2012: Colo-Colo (youth)
- 2011: Colo-Colo (interim)
- 2011: Colo-Colo (interim)
- 2012: Colo-Colo (interim)
- 2013: San Antonio Unido
- 2013–2014: Deportes La Serena
- 2016–2017: San Antonio Unido
- 2018–: Colo-Colo (youth)
- 2018: Colo-Colo (interim)
- 2025: Colo-Colo (interim)
- * Club domestic league appearances and goals

Luis Hernán Pérez Ramírez (born 17 April 1964) is a Chilean football manager and former player who played as a midfielder. He is the current manager of Colo-Colo's youth sides.

== Playing career ==
Pérez had a prolific career as football player in the Chilean football, in addition to a step with Atlético Morelia in Mexico. He retired in 2011 after playing for Deportes Melipilla.

At international level, he represented Chile in the 1984 Summer Olympics. At senior level, he earned 6 caps for the Chile national team between 1989 and 1996.

== Coaching career ==
Pérez has worked as head of technical staff of the Colo-Colo youth system as well as the interim coach of the first team. From 2013 to 2014 he worked as the coach of Deportes La Serena in the Primera B.

== Personal life ==
He is the cousin of the Chilean former professional footballer Julio Osorio, who represented Chile in the 1984 CONMEBOL Pre-Olympic Tournament.

== Honours ==
Universidad Católica

- Primera División de Chile: 1987, 1997 Apertura

Colo-Colo

- Primera División de Chile: 1991
- Copa Libertadores: 1991

Chile

- Copa Expedito Teixeira: 1990
