= Juan Carlos Almada =

Argentine footballer (born 1965)

Personal information
- Date of birth: May 15, 1965 (age 61)
- Place of birth: Buenos Aires, Argentina
- Position: Forward

Senior career*
Years	Team	Apps	(Gls)
1981–1984	Almagro		
1985–1986	Pico FC	–	(–)
1986–1987	Cipoletti	37	(7)
1987	Tte. Benjamín Matienzo	–	(–)
1988–1990	Defensa y Justicia	80	(38)
1990–1991	Deportes Concepción	51	(34)
1992	Cobreloa	0	(0)
1992–1993	Universidad Católica	58	(33)
1994–1995	Emelec	6	(0)
1996	Fernández Vial	4	(0)
1996	Olimpo de Bahía Blanca	4	(0)
1997	Deportes Concepción	6	(1)

Managerial career
- 2009: Defensa y Justicia
- 2010: Naval
- 2014: General Belgrano
- 2016–2017: General Belgrano
- 2018–2019: General Belgrano
- 2020: Mao Sport
- 2024: Cochicó
Medal record
First place	Copa Interamericana	1993
First place	Ecuadorian Serie A	1994
Second place	Copa Libertadores	1993
- * Club domestic league appearances and goals

Juan Carlos Almada (born May 15, 1965) is an Argentine football manager and former player who played as forward for clubs in Argentina, Chile and Ecuador.

== Teams ==
- (Argentina) Almagro 1981–1984
- (Argentina) Pico FC 1985–1986
- (Argentina) Cipoletti 1986–1987
- (Argentina) Tte. Benjamín Matienzo 1987
- (Argentina) Defensa y Justicia 1988–1990
- (Chile) Deportes Concepción 1990–1991
- (Chile) Cobreloa 1992
- (Chile) Universidad Católica 1992–1993
- (Ecuador) Emelec 1994–1995
- (Chile) Fernández Vial 1996
- (Argentina) Olimpo 1996
- (Chile) Deportes Concepción 1997

== Honours ==
Universidad Católica

- Copa Libertadores: 1993 (runner-up)

Emelec

- Ecuadorian Championship: 1994
