= Adrián Czornomaz =

Argentine footballer (born 1968)

Personal information
- Full name: Adrián Carlos Czornomaz
- Date of birth: April 30, 1968 (age 58)
- Place of birth: Sarandí, Buenos Aires, Argentina
- Height: 1.91 m (6 ft 3 in)
- Position: Striker

Youth career
- Defensores del Monte (five-a-side)
- Argentino de Quilmes

Senior career*
Years	Team	Apps	(Gls)
1986–1987	Argentino de Quilmes	–	(–)
1987–1989	Independiente	12	(3)
1990–1991	Cobreloa	40	(35)
1991–1992	San Lorenzo	29	(8)
1992	Rapid Wien	4	(1)
1992	Banfield	8	(5)
1993	Belgrano	7	(1)
1993–1994	Quilmes	40	(26)
1994–1995	All Boys	40	(27)
1995–1996	Los Andes	40	(22)
1996	Universitario	29	(20)
1997	Sporting Cristal	12	(9)
1997–1998	Tigres UANL	0	(0)
1997–1998	→ Los Andes (loan)	40	(31)
1998–1999	Atlético Tucumán	33	(26)
1999–2000	Quilmes	44	(24)
2000–2001	Gimnasia de Jujuy	28	(13)
2001	Tigre	13	(5)
2002	Independiente Rivadavia	13	(3)
2002–2003	Tristán Suárez	31	(11)
2003–2004	Defensa y Justicia	25	(2)
2004–2005	Argentino de Quilmes	28	(11)
2005–2006	Talleres RE	13	(1)
Total		529	(284)

Managerial career
- 2011: Atlético Tucumán
- 2011–2014: Quilmes B
- 2014–2015: Unión Santa Fe (assistant)
- 2018–2019: Fénix
- 2019: Talleres RE
- * Club domestic league appearances and goals

Adrián Carlos Czornomaz (born April 30, 1968) is an Argentine former professional footballer who played as a striker for several teams, mainly from the Argentine Primera B Nacional, of which he is the all-time top goalscorer with 160.

== Career ==
Born in Sarandí, Buenos Aires, Argentina, Czornomaz played baby-fútbol for Defensores del Monte before joining the youth ranks of Argentino de Quilmes, making his debut with them in the Primera C.

Czornomaz also played for Independiente, San Lorenzo de Almagro, Banfield, Belgrano, Quilmes, All Boys, Los Andes, Tucumán, Gimnasia y Esgrima, Tigre, Independiente Rivadavia, Tristán Suárez, Defensa y Justicia and Talleres de Escalada in Argentina, Cobreloa in Chile, SK Rapid Wien in Austria, Universitario and Sporting Cristal in Peru and Tigres de la UANL of Mexico.

== Personal life ==
Czornomaz is of Ukrainian descent. His son, Nicolás Czornomaz, currently plays for Panionios F.C. in the Super League Greece 2.

He was nicknamed Pirata (Pirate).

== Titles ==
- Liga Argentina: 1988/89
- National B: 1992/93
- runner-up of Copa Libertadores: 1997
- Maximum goleador of Liga Argentina of First " B" National (2): 1995/96 and 1998/99
- Maximum goleador of Chile Glass (1): 1990
- Maximum goleador of Decentralized Peruvian: 1996
