= Rodrigo Barrera =

Chilean footballer (born 1970)

Personal information
- Full name: Rodrigo Hernán Barrera Funes
- Date of birth: March 30, 1970 (age 56)
- Place of birth: Santiago, Chile
- Height: 1.70 m (5 ft 7 in)
- Position: Forward

Youth career
- Universidad Católica

Senior career*
Years	Team	Apps	(Gls)
1988–1996	Universidad Católica	195	(70)
1995–1996	→ Necaxa (loan)	17	(1)
1997–2001	Universidad de Chile	49	(14)
2002	Universidad Católica	24	(5)
2004	Olympiakos Nicosia	0	(0)
2004	Universidad de Chile	12	(2)
2005	Deportes Melipilla	26	(7)
2006	Palestino	12	(0)
Total		335	(99)

International career
1988	Chile U20		
1992	Chile U23		
1993–1998	Chile	22	(5)
- * Club domestic league appearances and goals

Rodrigo Hernán Barrera Funes (born March 30, 1970) is a Chilean former professional footballer who played as a forward.

== Club career ==
Barrera played mostly for Universidad Católica. He is nicknamed Chamuca.

A striker at Universidad Católica and Universidad de Chile, he helped the squad to its greatest triumphs. He also played for Necaxa in Mexico. Apart from universities, Barrera played in Palestino and Deportes Melipilla in Chile. He is notable for his pace.

Barrera played several years with Universidad Católica. Due to continuous changes, he left the club. In 2004, when Universidad de Chile became champion, he was hired again by the club. However, he remained with the squad for only the Clausura 2004 tournament.

== International career ==
Barrera represented Chile at under-20 level in the 1988 South American Championship. Four years later, he took part of Chile U23 in the 1992 Pre-Olympic Tournament.

He played for the Chile national football team and was a participant at the 1998 FIFA World Cup. He was capped 22 times, scoring 6 goals between 1993 and 1998, including a brace in a 3–3 tie against Argentina.

== Post-retirement ==
Barrera manages an engineering and air conditioning company.

== Honours ==
Universidad Católica

- Copa Chile: 1985, 1995
- Chilean Primera División: 2002 Apertura

Necaxa

- Mexican Primera División: 1995–96

Universidad de Chile

- Chilean Primera División: 1999, 2000
- Copa Chile: 1998, 2000
