= Rubén Martínez (footballer, born 1964) =

Chilean footballer

Personal information
- Full name: Rubén Ignacio Martínez Núñez
- Date of birth: 27 November 1964 (age 61)
- Place of birth: Santiago, Chile
- Position: Forward

Youth career
- Escuela Banco del Estado

Senior career*
Years	Team	Apps	(Gls)
1980	Campos de Batalla	–	(–)
1981–1989	Cobresal	158	(71)
1990–1993	Colo-Colo	82	(52)
1993–1994	Santos Laguna	41	(13)
1994–1995	Tampico Madero	35	(4)
1995	Unión Española	17	(6)
1996	Provincial Osorno	0	(0)
1996–1997	Deportes La Serena	33	(12)
1998–2000	Cobresal	66	(24)
Total		432	(182)

International career
1987–1990	Chile	12	(2)

Managerial career
- 2013–2015: Independiente de Cauquenes
- 2016: Deportes Vallenar
- 2016–2017: Independiente de Cauquenes
- 2018: Deportes Linares
- * Club domestic league appearances and goals

Rubén Ignacio Martínez Núñez (born November 27, 1964, in Santiago, Chile), known as Rubén Martínez, is a former Chilean footballer who played in clubs of Chile and Mexico. He played as a forward.

== Outside football ==
In 2025, Martínez was a candidate to deputy for the district 18 as a member of the Party of the People.

== Titles ==
- Cobresal 1987 (Copa Chile) and 1998 Primera B
- (Chile) Colo Colo 1990 and 1991 (Primera División), 1991 (Copa Libertadores) and 1992 (Recopa Sudamericana & Copa Interamericana)
- Chile 1990 (Copa Expedito Teixeira)

== Honours ==
- (Chile) Cobresal 1989 (Top Scorer Chilean Primera División Championship)
- (Chile) Colo Colo 1990 and 1991 (Top Scorer Chilean Primera División Championship)
