= Gustavo De Luca =

Argentine former footballer

Personal information
- Full name: Carlos Gustavo De Luca
- Date of birth: 13 February 1962 (age 64)
- Place of birth: Buenos Aires, Argentina
- Height: 1.85 m (6 ft 1 in)
- Position: Forward

Youth career
- Club San Fernando
- River Plate

Senior career*
Years	Team	Apps	(Gls)
1980–1982	River Plate	0	(0)
1983	Nueva Chicago	5	(0)
1984	Talleres RdE	26	(6)
1985–1986	All Boys	35	(6)
1986–1987	Douglas Haig	38	(14)
1987	Santiago Wanderers	26	(16)
1988	Cobreloa	–	(–)
1988–1989	Deportes La Serena	61	(36)
1990	FC Baden	11	(11)
1990	Deportes La Serena	29	(19)
1991–1993	O'Higgins	90	(50)
1992	→ Colo-Colo (loan)	–	(–)
1994	Alianza Lima	13	(2)
1994	Regional Atacama	22	(13)
1995	Deportes Temuco	29	(13)
1996	Santiago Wanderers	–	(–)
1996	Everton	12	(2)
Total		397	(188)
- * Club domestic league appearances and goals

Carlos Gustavo De Luca (born 13 February 1962) is an Argentine former footballer who played as a forward for various clubs in Argentina, Chile, Peru and Switzerland.

De Luca initially played rugby union, a sport he practiced until the age of seventeen. In 1982, when he was a River Plate youth player, he fought in the Falklands War.

== Club career ==
As a youth player, De Luca played for Club San Fernando and later joined the youth system of River Plate, where he featured for the club's reserve side before beginning his professional career.

De Luca spent most of his professional career in Chile, where he became a prolific goalscorer and established his reputation as a striker. During his time in the country he scored regularly in the top division, the second division and the Copa Chile.

He first gained prominence with Santiago Wanderers, where his goalscoring performances helped establish him in Chilean football. He later played for Cobreloa before continuing his career with several teams across the Chilean league system.

During his time in Chile he also represented Deportes La Serena, O'Higgins, Colo-Colo, Regional Atacama, Deportes Temuco and Everton.

== Honours ==
=== Club ===
Colo-Colo

- Recopa Sudamericana (1): 1992

Individual

- Segunda División de Chile Top-Scorer (1): 1987
- Primera División de Chile Top-Scorer (1): 1988
- Copa Chile Top-Scorer (1): 1991
