= Richard Zambrano =

Chilean footballer (born 1967)

Personal information
- Full name: Luis Richard Zambrano Chávez
- Date of birth: 20 May 1967 (age 59)
- Place of birth: Laja, Chile
- Height: 1.75 m (5 ft 9 in)
- Position: Striker

Youth career
- Deportes Laja

Senior career*
Years	Team	Apps	(Gls)
1984–1986	Deportes Laja		
1986–1989	Fernández Vial	96	(30)
1990–1991	Unión Española	24	(16)
1991–1992	St. Gallen		
1992	Unión Española	19	(2)
1993	Universidad de Chile		
1993–1995	Santos Laguna	36	(7)
1994	→ Deportivo Cali (loan)	16	(4)
1995–1996	Atlético Celaya	39	(12)
1997–1998	Colo-Colo	18	(1)
1998–2000	UNAM	41	(5)
2000	Audax Italiano	28	(9)
2001	Deportivo Italchacao		
2001	Deportes Puerto Montt	9	(1)
2002	Coquimbo Unido	25	(4)
2003–2006	Fernández Vial		

International career
1987	Chile B	5	(0)
1990–1993	Chile	8	(2)
- * Club domestic league appearances and goals

Luis Richard Zambrano Chávez (Spanish pronunciation: [riˈtʃaɾð samˈbɾano]; born 20 May 1967), known as just Richard Zambrano, is a Chilean former professional footballer.

== Career ==
Zambrano started his career with his hometown's club, Deportes Laja, in the mid-1980s.

Zambrano had successful spells in his country and Mexico and retired in 2006, aged 39. His last club was Arturo Fernández Vial. He also played in Venezuela for Deportivo Italchacao in 2001.

Zambrano also represented the Chile national football team in the 1993 Copa América in Ecuador, where he scored twice in a 3–2 victory over Brazil. Before, he represented the Chile B national team in the 1987 President's Cup International Football Tournament.

== In politics ==
Zambrano was a candidate to councillor for Los Ángeles commune in 2012.

== Honours ==
Colo-Colo

- Primera División de Chile: 1997 Clausura, 1998
