= Gerardo Reinoso =

Argentine footballer & manager (born 1965)

Personal information
- Full name: Gerardo Manuel Reinoso Torres
- Date of birth: 16 May 1965 (age 61)
- Place of birth: La Rioja, Argentina
- Height: 1.67 m (5 ft 6 in)
- Position: Midfielder

Team information
- Current team: Deportes Concepción (assistant)

Senior career*
Years	Team	Apps	(Gls)
1983–1987	Independiente	165	(22)
1988–1990	River Plate	20	(4)
1991	Boca Juniors	2	(1)
1992	Independiente	16	(1)
1992	Unión Española		
1993	Universidad Católica	36	(13)
1993–1994	Correcaminos		
1994–1995	Club León	34	(3)
1995	LDU Quito	19	(4)
1996	Santiago Wanderers	24	(3)
1997	Palestino	0	(0)
1998	Deportivo Cali	0	(0)
1998–1999	Jorge Wilstermann	33	(2)
2000	General Paz Juniors		
2001–2002	Patronato de Paraná		
2003	Oriente Petrolero	2	(1)

International career
- Argentina

Managerial career
- 2004–2006: Rangers de Talca
- 2006: Tiburones Rojos de Coatzacoalcos
- 2007: Veracruz (assistant)
- 2007–2008: Luis Ángel Firpo
- 2009–2011: San Telmo
- 2014–2015: Deportes Valdivia
- 2016: Trasandino
- 2017: Celaya (interim)
- 2018: Miami United FC
- 2023: Heredia
- 2023: Ciclón
- 2025: Club Aguará
- 2026-: Deportes Concepción (assistant)
- * Club domestic league appearances and goals

Gerardo Manuel Reinoso Torres (born 16 May 1965 in La Rioja) is an Argentine football manager and former player who played as a midfielder.

== Playing career ==
Reinoso started his career with Independiente where he was part of the squad that won the Copa Libertadores and Copa Intercontinental in 1984.

In 1988 Reinoso joined River Plate helping the club to win the 1989–1990 championship. In 1991, he joined River's fiercest rivals Boca Juniors but only played three games for the club, two of which were the championship final against Newell's Old Boys, which Boca lost.

After a brief return to Independiente Reinoso became a journeyman footballer, playing all over Latin America for clubs such as Unión Española, Santiago Wanderers, Palestino and Universidad Católica in Chile, Universidad Autonoma de Tamaulipas (Correcaminos) and Club Leon in Mexico, LDU Quito in Ecuador, Deportivo Cali and Independiente Santa Fe de Bogotá in Colombia, Jorge Wilstermann and Oriente Petrolero in Bolivia.

He also had spells in the Argentine lower leagues with General Paz Juniors and Patronato de Paraná.

== Managerial career ==
Reinoso worked as manager of General Paz Juniors and Patronato de Paraná in the lower leagues of Argentine football. He then had a spell with Rangers de Talca in Chile, Tiburones Rojos de Coatzacoalcos and Tiburones Rojos de Veracruz in Mexico, before joining Luis Ángel Firpo.

== Personal life ==
He is the father-in-law of Joaquín Larrivey, a professional football player.

== Honours ==
=== Player ===
Independiente

- Copa Libertadores: 1984
- Intercontinental Cup: 1984

River Plate

- Primera División Argentina: 1989–90

Deportivo Cali

- Colombian league: 1998
