= Jorge Contreras =

Chilean footballer (born 1960)

Personal information
- Full name: Jorge Alejandro Contreras Lira
- Date of birth: 3 July 1960 (age 66)
- Place of birth: Lo Barnechea, Santiago, Chile
- Height: 1.72 m (5 ft 8 in)
- Position: Attacking midfielder

Senior career*
Years	Team	Apps	(Gls)
1978–1980	Palestino		
1981–1982	Regional Atacama		
1983	Palestino		
1983–1989	Las Palmas	144	(46)
1989–1992	Universidad Católica		
1993–1994	Colo-Colo		
1994–1995	Tampico Madero	10	(1)
1995–1996	Deportes Concepción		
1997	Santiago Wanderers		
1998	Palestino		

International career
1983–1997	Chile	25	(2)

Managerial career
- 2008–2009: Unión La Calera
- 2010: Cobreloa (assistant)
- 2011: Deportes Puerto Montt
- 2012–2016: Barnechea (youth)
- 2016–2017: Barnechea
- 2017–2018: Barnechea (youth)
- 2019: Deportes Melipilla
- 2019–2020: Deportes Iberia
- * Club domestic league appearances and goals

Jorge Alejandro Contreras Lira (born 3 July 1960), usually known by his nickname Coke Contreras, is a Chilean former professional footballer who played as an attacking midfielder.

== Career ==
Contreras made his international debut in the 1983 Copa del Pacífico, a friendly match versus Peru, where Chile won by 2–0. He earned 25 caps for the Chile national team during his career, scoring two goals. Contreras retired in 1998.

== Personal life ==
Contreras was born in Lo Barnechea. He is the uncle of the footballer Diego Corral.

In 2012, Contreras was a candidate to councillor for Lo Barnechea commune.

== Career statistics ==
=== International ===
Scores and results list Chile's goal tally first, score column indicates score after each Contreras goal.

List of international goals scored by Jorge Contreras
No.	Date	Venue	Opponent	Score	Result	Competition
1	30 June 1987	Estadio Chateau Carreras, Córdoba, Argentina	Venezuela	2–1	3–1	1987 Copa América
2	8 July 1991	Estadio Ester Roa, Concepción, Chile	Peru	2–0	4–2	1991 Copa América

== Honours ==
=== Player ===
Universidad Católica

- Copa Chile: 1991

Colo-Colo

- Chilean Primera División: 1993
- Copa Chile: 1994

Chile

- Copa del Pacífico: 1983
- Copa Expedito Teixeira: 1990

=== Manager ===
Barnechea

- Segunda División Profesional: 2016–17
