= Aníbal González (footballer, born 1964) =

Chilean footballer

Personal information
- Full name: Aníbal Segundo González Espinoza
- Date of birth: 13 March 1964 (age 62)
- Place of birth: Rapel, Chile
- Height: 1.68 m (5 ft 6 in)
- Position: Forward

Youth career
- 25 de Febrero
- O'Higgins

Senior career*
| Years | Team | Apps | (Gls) |
| 1982–1986 | O'Higgins | | |
| 1982 | → Cultural Doñihue (loan) | | |
| 1987 | Cobreloa | | |
| 1988–1990 | O'Higgins | | |
| 1991 | Unión Española | | |
| 1992 | Colo-Colo | | |
| 1993 | Morelia | | |
| 1993–1994 | Monterrey | | |
| 1994 | → Colo-Colo (loan) | | |
| 1995 | Palestino | | |
| 1996-1997 | Universidad Católica | | |
| 1998 | Deportes Puerto Montt | | |
| 1999 | Santiago Wanderers | | |
| 2000–2001 | O'Higgins | | |

International career
| 1987 | Chile B | | |
| 1988–1991 | Chile | 10 | (1) |
Medal record
Men's football
Representing Chile
Pan American Games
| Silver medal – second place | 1987 Indianapolis | Team |
- * Club domestic league appearances and goals

Aníbal Segundo González Espinoza (born 13 March 1964 in Rapel, Cardenal Caro Province) is a retired Chilean footballer who played as a forward during his career.

González is the all-time goalscorer of the Chilean club O'Higgins, with a total of 117 goals at official competitions.

== International career ==
González represented Chile in the 1987 Pan American Games, winning the silver medal. Before, he represented the Chile B national team in the 1987 President's Cup International Football Tournament.

At senior level, he made his debut for the Chile national football team on June 5, 1988, in a friendly against the United States national football team.

== Personal life ==
He is better known by his nickname Tunga González.

He is the father of the former footballer of the same name Aníbal González Ramírez, who was born in Monterrey, Mexico.

González was elected councillor for Rancagua commune in 2012 and 2016 supported by Independent Democratic Union.

== Honours ==
Universidad Católica

- Primera División de Chile: 1997 Apertura

Colo-Colo

- Recopa Sudamericana: 1992
- Copa Interamericana: 1992

Chile B

- Pan American Games Silver medal: 1987

Individual

- Copa Chile: Top Scorer 1990 (13 goals)
- Primera División de Chile: Top Scorer 1992 (24 goals)
- Primera División de Chile: Top Scorer 1995 (18 goals)
