= 1991 Copa Libertadores =

32nd season of Copa Libertadores

1991 Copa Libertadores de América
Libertadores 1991

Tournament details
- Dates: February 20 – June 5
- Teams: 21 (from 10 associations)

Final positions
- Champions: (Chile) Colo-Colo (1st title)
- Runners-up: (Paraguay) Olimpia

Tournament statistics
- Matches played: 90
- Goals scored: 221 (2.46 per match)
- Top scorer: (Brazil) Gaúcho (8 goals)

The 1991 Copa Libertadores was won by Colo-Colo of Chile after defeating Olimpia of Paraguay with a 3–0 aggregate score in the finals. The championship would mark a first for a Chilean club team in an international tournament. Twenty-one clubs from all South American countries within Confederación Sudamericana de Fútbol (CONMEBOL) participated.

== Qualified teams ==
Country	Team	Qualification method
CONMEBOL (1 berth)	Olimpia	1990 Copa Libertadores champion
Argentina (2 berths)	River Plate	1989–90 Primera División champion
Argentina (2 berths)	Boca Juniors	1989–90 Liguilla Pre-Libertadores winner
Bolivia (2 berths)	Oriente Petrolero	1990 Primera División champion
Bolivia (2 berths)	Bolívar	1990 Primera División runner-up
Brazil (2 berths)	Corinthians	1990 Campeonato Brasileiro Série A champion
Brazil (2 berths)	Flamengo	1990 Copa do Brasil champion
Chile (2 berths)	Colo-Colo	1990 Primera División champion
Chile (2 berths)	Deportes Concepción	1990 Liguilla Pre-Libertadores winner
Colombia (2 berths)	América de Cali	1990 Campeonato Profesional champion
Colombia (2 berths)	Atlético Nacional	1990 Campeonato Profesional runner-up
Ecuador (2 berths)	LDU Quito	1990 Campeonato Ecuatoriano champion
Ecuador (2 berths)	Barcelona	1990 Campeonato Ecuatoriano runner-up
Paraguay (2 berths)	Cerro Porteño	1990 Primera División champion
Paraguay (2 berths)	Colegiales	1991 Pre-Libertadores playoff winner
Peru (2 berths)	Universitario	1990 Primera División champion
Peru (2 berths)	Sport Boys	1990 Primera División runner-up
Uruguay (2 berths)	Nacional	1990 Liguilla Pre-Libertadores winner
Uruguay (2 berths)	Bella Vista	1990 Liguilla Pre-Libertadores runner-up
Venezuela (2 berths)	Marítimo	1989–90 Primera División champion
Venezuela (2 berths)	Unión Atlético Táchira	1989–90 Primera División runner-up

== Draw ==
The champions and runners-up of each football association were drawn into the same group along with another football association's participating teams. Three clubs from Paraguay competed as Olimpia was champion of the 1990 Copa Libertadores. They entered the tournament in the Second round.

Group 1	Group 2	Group 3	Group 4	Group 5
Argentina; Bolivia	Chile; Ecuador	Brazil; Uruguay	Paraguay; Peru	Colombia; Venezuela

== Group stage ==
=== Group 1 ===
Group 1 standings
Pos	Team	Pld	W	D	L	GF	GA	GD	Pts	Qualification	(Bolivia) BOL	(Argentina) BOC	(Bolivia) OPE	(Argentina) RIV
1	(Bolivia) Bolívar	6	3	1	2	9	5	+4	7	Round of 16	—	2–0	2–0	4–1
2	(Argentina) Boca Juniors	6	2	2	2	6	6	0	6	Round of 16	0–0	—	0–0	4–3
3	(Bolivia) Oriente Petrolero	6	2	2	2	5	7	−2	6	Round of 16	2–1	1–0	—	1–1
4	(Argentina) River Plate	6	2	1	3	10	12	−2	5		2–0	0–2	3–1	—

Legend: Blue = home team win; Yellow = draw; Red = away team win.

=== Group 2 ===
Group 2 standings
Pos	Team	Pld	W	D	L	GF	GA	GD	Pts	Qualification	(Chile) CC	(Ecuador) LDQ	(Chile) CON	(Ecuador) BSC
1	(Chile) Colo-Colo	6	3	3	0	10	3	+7	9	Round of 16	—	3–0	2–0	3–1
2	(Ecuador) LDU Quito	6	2	2	2	5	6	−1	6	Round of 16	0–0	—	4–0	0–0
3	(Chile) Deportes Concepción	6	2	2	2	6	8	−2	6	Round of 16	0–0	3–0	—	1–0
4	(Ecuador) Barcelona	6	0	3	3	5	9	−4	3		2–2	0–1	2–2	—

Legend: Blue = home team win; Yellow = draw; Red = away team win.

=== Group 3 ===
Group 3 standings
Pos	Team	Pld	W	D	L	GF	GA	GD	Pts	Qualification	(Brazil) FLA	(Brazil) COR	(Uruguay) NAC	(Uruguay) BVI
1	(Brazil) Flamengo	6	3	3	0	11	4	+7	9	Round of 16	—	1–1	4–0	1–1
2	(Brazil) Corinthians	6	1	4	1	7	6	+1	6	Round of 16	0–2	—	0–0	4–1
3	(Uruguay) Nacional	6	2	2	2	7	6	+1	6	Round of 16	0–1	1–1	—	3–0
4	(Uruguay) Bella Vista	6	0	3	3	5	14	−9	3		2–2	1–1	0–3	—

Legend: Blue = home team win; Yellow = draw; Red = away team win.

=== Group 4 ===
Group 4 standings
Pos	Team	Pld	W	D	L	GF	GA	GD	Pts	Qualification	(Paraguay) COL	(Paraguay) CCP	(Peru) UNI	(Peru) SBA
1	(Paraguay) Colegiales	6	2	4	0	10	5	+5	8	Round of 16	—	1–1	2–0	4–1
2	(Paraguay) Cerro Porteño	6	2	4	0	9	4	+5	8	Round of 16	1–1	—	0–0	3–0
3	(Peru) Universitario	6	1	3	2	4	6	−2	5	Round of 16	0–0	1–1	—	1–3
4	(Peru) Sport Boys	6	1	1	4	7	15	−8	3		2–2	1–3	0–2	—

Legend: Blue = home team win; Yellow = draw; Red = away team win.

=== Group 5 ===
Group 5 standings
Pos	Team	Pld	W	D	L	GF	GA	GD	Pts	Qualification	(Colombia) AME	(Colombia) NAC	(Venezuela) TAC	(Venezuela) MAR
1	(Colombia) América de Cali	6	5	1	0	10	3	+7	11	Round of 16	—	1–0	3–2	2–0
2	(Colombia) Atlético Nacional	6	2	2	2	7	7	0	6	Round of 16	0–2	—	0–0	2–2
3	(Venezuela) Unión Atlético Táchira	6	1	3	2	6	7	−1	5	Round of 16	1–1	1–2	—	2–1
4	(Venezuela) Marítimo	6	0	2	4	4	10	−6	2		0–1	1–3	0–0	—

Legend: Blue = home team win; Yellow = draw; Red = away team win.
- Colombian club teams América, and Atlético Nacional were unable to play at their home venues. Their games were held in Miami, Florida and San Cristóbal, Venezuela.

== Round of 16 ==
- The top three teams in every group qualified along with Olimpia the champion of Copa Libertadores 1990
- First leg matches were played on April 16 and April 17, 1991. Second leg matches were played on April 24 and April 25, 1991.

Team 1	Agg.	Team 2	1st leg	2nd leg
Nacional	5–2	Bolívar	4–1	1–1
Universitario	1–2	Colo-Colo	0–0	1–2
Deportivo Táchira	2–8	Flamengo	2–3	0–5
Boca Juniors	4–2	Corinthians	3–1	1–1
Deportes Concepción	3–6	América de Cali	0–3	3–3
LDU Quito	2–4	Atlético Nacional	2–2	0–2
Olimpia	3–2	Colegiales	1–1	2–1
Oriente Petrolero	1–3	Cerro Porteño	1–1	0–2

== Quarterfinals ==
- First leg matches were played on May 1, May 2, and May 3, 1991. Second leg matches played on May 8 and May 10, 1991.

Team 1	Agg.	Team 2	1st leg	2nd leg
Colo-Colo	4–2	Nacional	4–0	0–2
Flamengo	2–4	Boca Juniors	2–1	0–3
América de Cali	0–2	Atlético Nacional	0–0	0–2
Cerro Porteño	1–3	Olimpia	1–0	0–3

== Semifinals ==
- First leg matches played on May 16, 1991. Second leg matches played on May 22 and May 23, 1991.

Team 1	Agg.	Team 2	1st leg	2nd leg
Boca Juniors	2–3	Colo-Colo	1–0	1–3
Atlético Nacional	0–1	Olimpia	0–0	0–1

== Finals ==
First leg match played on May 29, 1991, in Asunción, Paraguay at Defensores del Chaco stadium. Second leg final match played on June 5, 1991, in Santiago, Chile at Estadio Monumental David Arellano.

May 29, 1991	Olimpia (Paraguay)	0–0	(Chile) Colo-Colo	Estadio Defensores del Chaco, Asunción
21:45				Attendance: 48.000; Referee: Ernesto Filippi (Uruguay)

June 5, 1991	Colo-Colo (Chile)	3–0	(Paraguay) Olimpia	Estadio Monumental David Arellano, Santiago
20:30	Pérez 12', 17'; Herrera 85'			Attendance: 66.517; Referee: José Roberto Wright (Brazil)

Colo-Colo won 3-0 on aggregate.

== Champion ==
Copa Libertadores
1991 winners

1st title
