= Chile national football team records and statistics =

This is a list of Chile national football team's competitive records. The Chile national football team represents Chile in men's international football competitions and is controlled by the Federación de Fútbol de Chile which was established in 1895.

== Individual records ==
=== Player records ===
As of 10 June 2025
Players in bold are still active at international level.

==== Most capped players ====
Rank	Player	Caps	Goals	International career
1	**Alexis Sánchez**	168	51	2006–present
2	**Gary Medel**	161	7	2007–present
3	Claudio Bravo	150	0	2004–2024
4	**Arturo Vidal**	147	34	2007–present
5	**Mauricio Isla**	144	5	2007–present
6	**Eduardo Vargas**	120	45	2009–present
7	Gonzalo Jara	115	3	2006–2019
8	Jean Beausejour	109	6	2004–2021
9	**Charles Aránguiz**	103	7	2009–present
10	Leonel Sánchez	85	24	1955–1968

==== Top goalscorers ====
Rank	Player	Goals	Caps	Ratio	International career
1	**Alexis Sánchez**	51	168	0.3	2006–present
2	**Eduardo Vargas**	45	120	0.38	2009–present
3	Marcelo Salas	37	70	0.53	1994–2007
4	Iván Zamorano	34	69	0.49	1987–2001
4	**Arturo Vidal**	34	147	0.23	2007–present
6	Carlos Caszely	29	49	0.59	1969–1985
7	Leonel Sánchez	24	85	0.28	1955–1968
8	Jorge Aravena	22	37	0.59	1983–1990
9	Humberto Suazo	21	60	0.35	2005–2013
10	Juan Carlos Letelier	18	57	0.32	1979–1989

== Competition records ==
=== FIFA World Cup ===
Champions Runners-up Third place Fourth place

FIFA World Cup record										Qualification record					
Year	Round	Position	Pld	W	D	L	GF	GA	Squad	Pld	W	D	L	GF	GA
(Uruguay) 1930	Group stage	5th	3	2	0	1	5	3	Squad	Qualified as invitees					
(Italy) 1934	Withdrew									Withdrew					
(France) 1938	Withdrew									Withdrew					
(Brazil) 1950	Group stage	9th	3	1	0	2	5	6	Squad	Qualified automatically					
(Switzerland) 1954	Did not qualify									4	0	0	4	1	10
(Sweden) 1958	Did not qualify									4	1	0	3	2	10
(Chile) 1962	Third place	3rd	6	4	0	2	10	8	Squad	Qualified as hosts					
(England) 1966	Group stage	13th	3	0	1	2	2	5	Squad	5	3	1	1	14	8
(Mexico) 1970	Did not qualify									4	1	2	1	5	4
(West Germany) 1974	Group stage	11th	3	0	2	1	1	2	Squad	5	3	1	1	6	2
(Argentina) 1978	Did not qualify									4	2	1	1	5	3
(Spain) 1982	Group stage	22nd	3	0	0	3	3	8	Squad	4	3	1	0	6	0
(Mexico) 1986	Did not qualify									9	5	2	2	18	12
(Italy) 1990	Did not qualify									4	2	1	1	9	4
(United States) 1994	Banned									Banned					
(France) 1998	Round of 16	16th	4	0	3	1	5	8	Squad	16	7	4	5	32	18
(South Korea) (Japan) 2002	Did not qualify									18	3	3	12	15	27
(Germany) 2006	Did not qualify									18	5	7	6	18	22
(South Africa) 2010	Round of 16	10th	4	2	0	2	3	5	Squad	18	10	3	5	32	22
(Brazil) 2014	Round of 16	9th	4	2	1	1	6	4	Squad	16	9	1	6	29	25
(Russia) 2018	Did not qualify									18	8	2	8	26	27
(Qatar) 2022	Did not qualify									18	5	4	9	19	26
(Canada) (Mexico) (United States) 2026	Did not qualify									18	2	5	11	9	27
(Morocco) (Spain) (Portugal) 2030	To be determined									To be determined					
(Saudi Arabia) 2034	To be determined									To be determined					
Total	Third place	9/23	33	11	7	15	40	49	—	182	68	38	76	245	248

=== Copa América ===
South American Championship / Copa América record
Year	Round	Position	Pld	W	D	L	GF	GA	Squad
(Argentina) 1916	Fourth place	4th	3	0	1	2	2	11	Squad
(Uruguay) 1917	Fourth place	4th	3	0	0	3	0	10	Squad
(Brazil) 1919	Fourth place	4th	3	0	0	3	1	12	Squad
(Chile) 1920	Fourth place	4th	3	0	1	2	2	4	Squad
(Argentina) 1921	Withdrew								
(Brazil) 1922	Fifth place	5th	4	0	1	3	1	10	Squad
(Uruguay) 1923	Withdrew								
(Uruguay) 1924	Fourth place	4th	3	0	0	3	1	10	Squad
(Argentina) 1925	Withdrew								
(Chile) 1926	Third place	3rd	4	2	1	1	14	6	Squad
(Peru) 1927	Withdrew								
(Argentina) 1929	Did not participate								
(Peru) 1935	Fourth place	4th	3	0	0	3	2	7	Squad
(Argentina) 1937	Fifth place	5th	5	1	1	3	12	13	Squad
(Peru) 1939	Fourth place	4th	4	1	0	3	8	12	Squad
(Chile) 1941	Third place	3rd	4	2	0	2	6	3	Squad
(Uruguay) 1942	Sixth place	6th	6	1	1	4	4	15	Squad
(Chile) 1945	Third place	3rd	6	4	1	1	15	5	Squad
(Argentina) 1946	Fifth place	5th	5	2	0	3	8	11	Squad
(Ecuador) 1947	Fourth place	4th	7	4	1	2	14	13	Squad
(Brazil) 1949	Fifth place	5th	7	2	1	4	10	14	Squad
(Peru) 1953	Fourth place	4th	6	3	1	2	10	10	Squad
(Chile) 1955	Runners-up	2nd	5	3	1	1	19	8	Squad
(Uruguay) 1956	Runners-up	2nd	5	3	0	2	11	8	Squad
(Peru) 1957	Sixth place	6th	6	1	1	4	9	17	Squad
(Argentina) 1959	Fifth place	5th	6	2	1	3	9	14	Squad
(Ecuador) 1959	Did not participate								
(Bolivia) 1963	Did not participate								
(Uruguay) 1967	Third place	3rd	5	2	2	1	8	6	Squad
1975	Group stage	6th	4	1	1	2	7	6	Squad
1979	Runners-up	2nd	9	4	3	2	13	6	Squad
1983	Group stage	5th	4	2	1	1	8	2	Squad
(Argentina) 1987	Runners-up	2nd	4	3	0	1	9	3	Squad
(Brazil) 1989	Group stage	5th	4	2	0	2	7	5	Squad
(Chile) 1991	Third place	3rd	7	3	2	2	11	6	Squad
(Ecuador) 1993	Group stage	9th	3	1	0	2	3	4	Squad
(Uruguay) 1995	Group stage	11th	3	0	1	2	3	8	Squad
(Bolivia) 1997	Group stage	11th	3	0	0	3	1	5	Squad
(Paraguay) 1999	Fourth place	4th	6	2	1	3	8	7	Squad
(Colombia) 2001	Quarter-finals	7th	4	2	0	2	5	5	Squad
(Peru) 2004	Group stage	10th	3	0	1	2	2	4	Squad
(Venezuela) 2007	Quarter-finals	8th	4	1	1	2	4	11	Squad
(Argentina) 2011	Quarter-finals	5th	4	2	1	1	5	4	Squad
(Chile) 2015	Champions	1st	6	4	2	0	13	4	Squad
(United States) 2016	Champions	1st	6	4	1	1	16	5	Squad
(Brazil) 2019	Fourth place	4th	6	2	1	3	7	7	Squad
(Brazil) 2021	Quarter-finals	7th	5	1	2	2	3	5	Squad
(United States) 2024	Group stage	11th	3	0	2	1	0	1	Squad
Total	2 Titles	41/48	191	67	35	89	291	317	—

=== FIFA Confederations Cup ===
FIFA Confederations Cup record
Year	Round	Position	Pld	W	D	L	GF	GA	Squad
(Saudi Arabia) 1992	Did not qualify								
(Saudi Arabia) 1995	Did not qualify								
(Saudi Arabia) 1997	Did not qualify								
(Mexico) 1999	Did not qualify								
(South Korea) (Japan) 2001	Did not qualify								
(France) 2003	Did not qualify								
(Germany) 2005	Did not qualify								
(South Africa) 2009	Did not qualify								
(Brazil) 2013	Did not qualify								
(Russia) 2017	Runners-up	2nd	5	1	3	1	4	3	Squad
Total	Runners-up	1/10	5	1	3	1	4	3	—

=== Olympic Games ===
Olympic Games record
Year	Round	Position	Pld	W	D	L	GF	GA	Squad
(Greece) 1896	No football tournament								
(France) 1900	Did not participate								
(United States) 1904	Did not participate								
(United Kingdom) 1908	Did not participate								
(Sweden) 1912	Did not participate								
(Belgium) 1920	Did not participate								
(France) 1924	Did not participate								
(Netherlands) 1928	Consolation final	10th	3	1	1	1	7	7	Squad
(United States) 1932	No football tournament								
(Nazi Germany) 1936	Withdrew								
(United Kingdom) 1948	Did not participate								
(Finland) 1952	Preliminary round	17th	1	0	0	1	4	5	Squad
(Australia) 1956	Did not participate								
(Italy) 1960	Did not qualify								
(Japan) 1964	Did not qualify								
(Mexico) 1968	Did not qualify								
(West Germany) 1972	Did not qualify								
(Canada) 1976	Did not qualify								
(Soviet Union) 1980	Did not qualify								
(United States) 1984	Quarter-finals	7th	4	1	2	1	2	2	Squad
(Korea) 1988	Did not qualify								
Since 1992	See Chile Olympic football team								
Total	Quarter-finals	3/19	8	6	3	5	27	20	—

=== Pan American Games ===
Pan American Games record
Year	Round	Position	Pld	W	D	L	GF	GA
(Argentina) 1951	Bronze medal	3rd	4	1	2	1	8	6
(Mexico) 1955	Did not participate							
(United States) 1959	Did not participate							
(Brazil) 1963	Bronze medal	3rd	4	2	1	1	12	6
(Canada) 1967	Did not participate							
(Colombia) 1971	Did not participate							
(Mexico) 1975	Did not participate							
(Puerto Rico) 1979	Did not participate							
(Venezuela) 1983	Round 1	4th	3	1	2	0	3	2
(United States) 1987	Silver medal	2nd	5	2	2	1	6	6
(Cuba) 1991	Did not participate							
(Argentina) 1995	Quarter-finals	7th	4	1	1	2	3	6
Since 1999	See Chile national under-23 football team							
Total	Silver medal	5/12	20	7	8	5	32	26

== Head-to-head record ==
This is a list of the official games played by the Chile national team. The team has played a number of countries around the world, some repeatedly. It has played the most games (93) against neighbouring Argentina.

This list is updated to include the match against Mexico on 6 October 2026.

=== AFC ===
Team	Pld	W	D	L	GF	GA	GD	WPCT
Australia (Note: Football Federation Australia were founder members of the Oceania Football Confederation (OFC) before joining the Asian Football Confederation in 2006. Matches against Australia prior to 2006 are included in the OFC section.)	2	1	1	0	4	2	+2	50.00
Bahrain	1	1	0	0	2	0	+2	100.00
China	1	0	1	0	0	0	0	0.00
Iran	3	1	1	1	3	4	−1	33.33
Iraq	1	1	0	0	6	0	+6	100.00
Japan	3	1	1	1	4	4	0	33.33
North Korea	1	0	1	0	1	1	0	0.00
Oman	1	1	0	0	1	0	+1	100.00
Qatar	1	0	1	0	2	2	0	0.00
Saudi Arabia	2	1	1	0	4	2	+2	50.00
South Korea	3	1	1	1	1	2	−1	33.33
United Arab Emirates	1	1	0	0	2	0	+2	100.00
Total	20	9	8	3	30	17	+13	45.00

Source: Results 1910–59, 1960–79, 1980–99, 2000–19 and 2020–present

=== CAF ===
Team	Pld	W	D	L	GF	GA	GD	WPCT
Algeria	1	0	0	1	2	3	−1	0.00
Burkina Faso	1	1	0	0	3	0	+3	100.00
Cameroon	2	1	1	0	3	1	+2	50.00
Cape Verde	1	1	0	0	4	2	+2	100.00
DR Congo	1	1	0	0	2	1	+1	100.00
Egypt	3	2	0	1	5	5	0	66.67
Ghana	2	0	2	0	1	1	0	0.00
Guinea	1	1	0	0	3	2	+1	100.00
Ivory Coast	1	0	1	0	1	1	0	0.00
Morocco	2	0	1	1	1	3	−2	0.00
South Africa	1	1	0	0	2	0	+2	100.00
Tunisia	2	1	0	1	3	4	−1	50.00
Zambia	1	1	0	0	3	0	+3	100.00
Total	19	10	5	4	33	23	+10	52.63

Source: Results 1910–59, 1960–79, 1980–99, 2000–19 and 2020–present

=== CONCACAF ===
Team	Pld	W	D	L	GF	GA	GD	WPCT
Canada	6	2	2	2	4	3	+1	33.33
Costa Rica	11	3	2	6	14	13	+1	27.27
Cuba	3	3	0	0	8	0	+8	100.00
Dominican Republic	1	1	0	0	5	0	+5	100.00
El Salvador	3	3	0	0	3	0	+3	100.00
Guatemala	5	3	1	1	9	4	+5	60.00
Haiti	8	4	3	1	8	3	+5	50.00
Honduras	7	4	0	3	14	11	+3	57.14
Jamaica	2	1	0	1	2	2	0	50.00
Mexico	34	13	6	15	44	37	+7	38.24
Panama	4	3	1	0	12	4	+8	75.00
Trinidad and Tobago	1	1	0	0	2	0	+2	100.00
United States	12	5	3	4	24	18	+6	41.67
Total	97	46	18	33	149	95	+54	47.42

Source: Results 1910–59, 1960–79, 1980–99, 2000–19 and 2020–present

=== CONMEBOL ===
Team	Pld	W	D	L	GF	GA	GD	WPCT
Argentina	93	6	25	62	72	199	−127	6.45
Bolivia	51	33	9	9	117	53	+64	64.71
Brazil	78	8	14	56	62	179	−117	10.26
Colombia	44	15	17	12	70	59	+11	34.09
Ecuador	55	28	14	13	98	57	+41	50.91
Paraguay	69	31	8	30	96	94	+2	44.93
Peru	87	46	16	25	136	111	+25	52.87
Uruguay	85	18	20	47	86	149	−63	21.18
Venezuela	31	22	5	4	76	22	+54	70.97
Total	593	207	128	258	813	923	−110	34.91

Source: Results 1910–59, 1960–79, 1980–99, 2000–19 and 2020–present

Chile–Peru football rivalry

=== OFC ===
Team	Pld	W	D	L	GF	GA	GD	WPCT
Australia (Note: Football Federation Australia were founder members of the Oceania Football Confederation (OFC) before joining the Asian Football Confederation in 2006. Matches against Australia after 2006 are included in the AFC section.)	4	3	1	0	6	1	+5	75.00
New Zealand	5	3	1	1	9	6	+3	60.00
Total	9	6	2	1	15	7	+8	66.67

Source: Results 1910–59, 1960–79, 1980–99, 2000–19 and 2020–present

=== UEFA ===
Team	Pld	W	D	L	GF	GA	GD	WPCT
Albania	1	1	0	0	3	0	+3	100.00
Armenia	1	1	0	0	7	0	+7	100.00
Austria	3	1	1	1	3	2	+1	33.33
Belgium	2	0	2	0	2	2	0	0.00
Bulgaria	1	1	0	0	3	2	+1	100.00
Croatia	1	0	1	0	1	1	0	0.00
Czechoslovakia	1	1	0	0	3	0	+3	100.00
Denmark	2	1	1	0	2	1	+1	50.00
East Germany	4	1	1	2	4	7	−3	25.00
England	6	2	2	2	5	4	+1	33.33
Estonia	1	1	0	0	4	0	+4	100.00
Finland	1	1	0	0	2	0	+2	100.00
France	6	2	1	3	7	14	−7	33.33
Germany	3	0	1	2	1	3	−2	0.00
Greece	1	0	0	1	0	1	−1	0.00
Hungary	3	1	1	1	9	6	+3	33.33
Iceland	2	1	1	0	2	1	+1	50.00
Italy	3	1	1	1	4	4	0	33.33
Israel	2	1	0	1	3	1	+2	50.00
Lithuania	1	1	0	0	1	0	+1	100.00
Netherlands	2	0	1	1	2	4	−2	0.00
Northern Ireland	4	4	0	0	6	1	+5	100.00
Poland	2	0	1	1	2	3	−1	0.00
Portugal	5	0	2	3	5	11	−6	0.00
Republic of Ireland	6	3	1	2	6	6	0	50.00
Romania	3	0	0	3	6	9	−3	0.00
Russia	2	1	1	0	3	1	+2	50.00
Scotland	2	0	0	2	2	6	−4	0.00
Serbia	2	1	0	1	2	3	−1	50.00
Slovakia	3	1	1	1	2	3	−1	33.33
Soviet Union	7	2	1	4	6	10	−4	28.57
Spain	11	1	2	8	10	25	−15	9.09
Sweden	2	1	1	0	3	2	+1	50.00
Switzerland	4	2	0	2	7	7	0	50.00
Turkey	3	0	1	2	1	4	−3	0.00
Ukraine	1	0	0	1	1	2	−1	0.00
Wales	1	1	0	0	2	0	+2	100.00
West Germany	6	2	0	4	7	11	−4	33.33
Yugoslavia	1	1	0	0	1	0	+1	100.00
Total	112	38	25	49	140	157	−17	33.93

Source: Results 1910–59, 1960–79, 1980–99, 2000–19 and 2020–present

=== Full Confederation record ===
Team	Pld	W	D	L	GF	GA	GD	WPCT
AFC	20	9	8	3	30	17	+13	45.00
CAF	19	10	5	4	33	23	+10	52.63
CONCACAF	97	46	18	33	149	95	+54	47.42
CONMEBOL	593	207	128	258	813	923	−110	34.91
OFC	9	6	2	1	15	7	+8	66.67
UEFA	112	38	25	49	140	157	−17	33.93
Total	850	316	186	348	1180	1222	−42	37.18

Source: Results 1910–59, 1960–79, 1980–99, 2000–19 and 2020–present
