= Chile national football team results (1960–1979) =

This page details the match results and statistics of the Chile national football team from 1960 to 1979.

== Key ==
Key to matches

- Att.=Match attendance
- (H)=Home ground
- (A)=Away ground
- (N)=Neutral ground

Key to record by opponent

- Pld=Games played
- W=Games won
- D=Games drawn
- L=Games lost
- GF=Goals for
- GA=Goals against

== Results ==
Chile's score is shown first in each case.

No.	Date	Venue	Opponents	Score	Competition	Chile scorers	Att.	Ref.
160	16 March 1960	Parc des Princes, Paris (A)	France	0–6	Friendly		36,094	
161	23 March 1960	Neckarstadion, Stuttgart (A)	West Germany	1–2	Friendly	J. Soto	—	
162	30 March 1960	Dalymount Park, Dublin (A)	Republic of Ireland	0–2	Friendly		17,000	
163	6 April 1960	St. Jakob Stadium, Basel (A)	Switzerland	2–4	Friendly	J. Soto, Musso	—	
164	13 April 1960	King Baudouin Stadium, Brussels (A)	Belgium	1–1	Friendly	Musso	11,702	
165	1 June 1960	Santiago (H)	Uruguay	2–3	Friendly	Moreno, Fouillioux	—	
166	5 June 1960	Estadio Centenario, Montevideo (A)	Uruguay	2–2	Friendly	Sánchez (2)	—	
167	29 June 1960	Maracanã Stadium, Rio de Janeiro (A)	Brazil	0–4	Friendly		—	
168	14 July 1960	Estadio Nacional, Santiago (H)	Spain	0–4	Friendly		—	
169	17 July 1960	Estadio Nacional, Santiago (H)	Spain	1–4	Friendly	Musso	—	
170	18 December 1960	Santiago (H)	Paraguay	4–1	Friendly	Cabrera (2), Moreno (2)	—	
171	21 December 1960	Valparaíso (H)	Paraguay	3–1	Friendly	Cabrera (2), Moreno	—	
172	19 March 1961	Santiago (H)	Peru	5–2	Friendly	Toro, Betta, J. Soto, Sánchez (2)	—	
173	26 March 1961	Santiago (H)	West Germany	3–1	Friendly	E. Rojas, Sánchez (2)	60,000	
174	7 May 1961	Estadio Nacional, Santiago (H)	Brazil	1–2	Copa Bernardo O'Higgins		—	
175	11 May 1961	Estadio Nacional, Santiago (H)	Brazil	0–1	Copa Bernardo O'Higgins	J. Soto	—	
176	12 October 1961	Santiago (H)	Uruguay	2–3	Friendly	Fouillioux, Moreno	—	
177	22 November 1961	Estadio Nacional, Santiago (H)	Soviet Union	0–1	Friendly		70,000	
178	9 December 1961	Santiago (H)	Hungary	5–1	Friendly		55,000	
179	13 December 1961	Santiago (H)	Hungary	0–0	Friendly		42,000	
180	30 May 1962	Estadio Nacional, Santiago (N)	Switzerland	3–1	1962 FIFA World Cup	Sánchez (2), J. Ramírez	65,006	
181	2 June 1962	Estadio Nacional, Santiago (N)	Italy	2–0	1962 FIFA World Cup	J. Ramírez, Toro	66,057	
182	6 June 1962	Estadio Nacional, Santiago (N)	West Germany	0–2	1962 FIFA World Cup		67,224	
183	10 June 1962	Estadio Carlos Dittborn, Arica (N)	Soviet Union	2–1	1962 FIFA World Cup	Sánchez, E. Rojas	17,268	
184	13 June 1962	Estadio Nacional, Santiago (N)	Brazil	2–4	1962 FIFA World Cup	Toro, Sánchez	76,594	
185	16 June 1962	Estadio Nacional, Santiago (N)	Yugoslavia	1–0	1962 FIFA World Cup	E. Rojas	66,697	
186	7 November 1962	Estadio Nacional, Santiago (H)	Argentina	1–1	Copa Carlos Dittborn	Landa	—	
187	21 November 1962	Estadio Monumental, Buenos Aires (A)	Argentina	0–1	Copa Carlos Dittborn		—	
188	23 March 1963	Estadio Centenario, Montevideo (A)	Uruguay	2–3	Copa Juan Pinto Durán	O. Ramírez (2)	—	
189	24 July 1963	Santiago (H)	Uruguay	0–0	Copa Juan Pinto Durán		—	
190	24 September 1964	Estadio Monumental, Buenos Aires (A)	Argentina	0–5	Copa Carlos Dittborn		—	
191	14 October 1964	Estadio Nacional, Santiago (H)	Argentina	1–1	Copa Carlos Dittborn	Verdejo	—	
192	15 April 1965	Santiago (H)	Peru	4–1	Copa del Pacífico	Landa (2), Araya (2)	—	
193	28 April 1965	Estadio Nacional, Lima (A)	Peru	1–0	Copa del Pacífico	Araya	—	
194	9 May 1965	Santiago (H)	Uruguay	0–0	Copa Juan Pinto Durán		—	
195	16 May 1965	Estadio Centenario, Montevideo (A)	Uruguay	1–1	Copa Juan Pinto Durán	Sánchez	—	
196	14 July 1965	Estadio Monumental, Buenos Aires (A)	Argentina	0–1	Copa Carlos Dittborn		—	
197	21 July 1965	Estadio Nacional, Santiago (H)	Argentina	1–1	Copa Carlos Dittborn	Sánchez	—	
198	1 August 1965	Estadio Nacional, Santiago (H)	Colombia	7–2	1966 FIFA World Cup qualification	Sánchez, Méndez (2), Fouillioux (2), Campos, Prieto	70,052	
199	7 August 1965	Romelio Martínez Stadium, Barranquilla (A)	Colombia	0–2	1966 FIFA World Cup qualification		4,401	
200	15 August 1965	Estadio Modelo, Guayaquil (A)	Ecuador	2–2	1966 FIFA World Cup qualification	Campos, Prieto	50,041	
201	22 August 1965	Estadio Nacional, Santiago (H)	Ecuador	3–1	1966 FIFA World Cup qualification	Sánchez, Marcos, Fouillioux	70,602	
202	12 October 1965	Estadio Nacional, Lima (N)	Ecuador	2–1	1966 FIFA World Cup qualification play-off	Sánchez, Marcos	44,864	
203	23 February 1966	Estadio Nacional, Santiago (H)	Soviet Union	0–2	Friendly		70,000	
204	17 April 1966	Estadio Nacional, Santiago (H)	Brazil	0–1	Copa Bernardo O'Higgins		—	
205	20 April 1966	Estadio Sausalito, Viña del Mar (H)	Brazil	2–1	Copa Bernardo O'Higgins	Landa, Valdés	—	
206	11 May 1966	Mexico City (A)	Mexico	0–1	Friendly		70,000	
207	15 May 1966	Estádio do Morumbi, São Paulo (A)	Brazil	1–1	Friendly	Yávar	—	
208	19 May 1966	Maracanã Stadium, Rio de Janeiro (A)	Brazil	0–1	Friendly		—	
209	22 May 1966	Estadio Nacional, Santiago (H)	Wales	2–0	Friendly	Tobar, Marcos	54,000	
210	29 May 1966	Estadio Nacional, Santiago (H)	Mexico	0–1	Friendly		—	
211	2 July 1966	Zentralstadion, Leipzig (A)	East Germany	2–5	Friendly	Tobar, Fouillioux	45,000	
212	13 July 1966	Roker Park, Sunderland (N)	Italy	0–2	1966 FIFA World Cup		27,199	
213	15 July 1966	Ayresome Park, Middlesbrough (N)	North Korea	1–1	1966 FIFA World Cup	Marcos	13,792	
214	20 July 1966	Roker Park, Sunderland (N)	Soviet Union	1–2	1966 FIFA World Cup	Marcos	16,027	
215	30 November 1966	Estadio Nacional, Santiago (H)	Colombia	5–2	1967 South American Championship qualification	Araya, Campos, Prieto (2), Saavedra	80,000	
216	11 December 1966	Estadio El Campín, Bogotá (A)	Colombia	0–0	1967 South American Championship qualification		17,000	
217	18 January 1967	Estadio Centenario, Montevideo (N)	Venezuela	2–0	1967 South American Championship	Marcos (2)	7,000	
218	22 January 1967	Estadio Centenario, Montevideo (N)	Paraguay	4–2	1967 South American Championship	Gallardo (2), Araya (2)	6,000	
219	26 January 1967	Estadio Centenario, Montevideo (N)	Uruguay	2–2	1967 South American Championship	Gallardo, Marcos	30,000	
220	28 January 1967	Estadio Centenario, Montevideo (N)	Argentina	0–2	1967 South American Championship		14,000	
221	1 February 1967	Estadio Centenario, Montevideo (N)	Bolivia	0–0	1967 South American Championship		15,000	
222	15 August 1967	Santiago (H)	Argentina	1–0	Friendly	Araya	—	
223	19 September 1967	Estadio Nacional, Santiago (H)	Brazil	0–1	Friendly		—	
224	8 November 1967	Estadio Nacional, Santiago (H)	Argentina	3–1	Friendly	Fouillioux (2), Reinoso	—	
225	13 December 1967	Santiago (H)	Hungary	4–5	Friendly	Reinoso, Sánchez, Castro, Hodge	—	
226	17 December 1967	Estadio Nacional, Santiago (H)	Soviet Union	1–4	Friendly	Araya	30,000	
227	18 August 1968	Estadio Nacional, Lima (A)	Peru	2–1	Copa del Pacífico	Valdés (2)	—	
228	21 August 1968	Estadio Nacional, Lima (A)	Peru	0–0	Copa del Pacífico		—	
229	28 August 1968	Estadio Azteca, Mexico City (A)	Mexico	1–3	Friendly	Araya	—	
230	23 October 1968	Estadio Nacional, Santiago (H)	Mexico	3–1	Friendly	Fouillioux, Díaz, Gallé	40,000	
231	27 November 1968	Estadio Lisandro de la Torre, Rosario (A)	Argentina	0–4	Copa Carlos Dittborn		—	
232	4 December 1968	Estadio Nacional, Santiago (H)	Argentina	2–1	Copa Carlos Dittborn	Fouillioux, Olivares	—	
233	18 December 1968	Santiago (H)	West Germany	2–1	Friendly	Araya, Marcos	—	
234	28 May 1969	Santiago (H)	Argentina	1–1	Friendly	Leonardo Véliz	—	
235	8 June 1969	Asunción (A)	Paraguay	1–0	Friendly	Araya	—	
236	11 June 1969	La Plata (A)	Argentina	1–2	Friendly	Olivares	—	
237	15 June 1969	Bogotá (A)	Colombia	3–3	Friendly	Fouillioux, Reinoso, Laube	50,000	
238	22 June 1969	Ernst Grube Stadium, Magdeburg (A)	East Germany	1–0	Friendly	Yávar	20,000	
239	6 July 1969	Santiago (H)	Paraguay	0–0	Friendly		45,000	
240	13 July 1969	Estadio Nacional, Santiago (H)	Uruguay	0–0	1970 FIFA World Cup qualification		68,882	
241	27 July 1969	Estadio Nacional, Santiago (H)	Ecuador	4–1	1970 FIFA World Cup qualification	Olivares (2), Valdés (2)	68,857	
242	3 August 1969	Estadio Modelo, Guayaquil (A)	Ecuador	1–1	1970 FIFA World Cup qualification	Olivares	11,565	
243	10 August 1969	Estadio Centenario, Montevideo (A)	Uruguay	0–2	1970 FIFA World Cup qualification		62,693	
244	22 March 1970	Estádio do Morumbi, São Paulo (A)	Brazil	0–5	Friendly		100,000	
245	26 March 1970	Maracanã Stadium, Rio de Janeiro (A)	Brazil	1–2	Friendly	Castro	110,000	
246	4 October 1970	Estadio Nacional, Santiago (H)	Brazil	1–5	Friendly	Messen	75,000	
247	2 February 1971	Estadio Nacional, Santiago (H)	East Germany	0–1	Friendly		20,000	
248	14 July 1971	Santiago (H)	Paraguay	3–2	Friendly	Castro (2), Osorio	30,000	
249	21 July 1971	Estadio Nacional, Santiago (H)	Argentina	2–2	Copa Carlos Dittborn	Viveros, Vásquez	—	
250	4 August 1971	Boca Juniors Stadium, Buenos Aires (A)	Argentina	0–1	Copa Carlos Dittborn		—	
251	8 August 1971	Asunción (A)	Paraguay	0–2	Friendly		—	
252	11 August 1971	Estadio Nacional, Lima (A)	Peru	0–1	Copa del Pacífico		—	
253	15 August 1971	La Paz (A)	Bolivia	4–3	Friendly	Peralta (2), Messen, Osorio	—	
254	18 August 1971	Santiago (H)	Peru	1–0	Copa del Pacífico	Viveros	—	
255	27 October 1971	Estadio Centenario, Montevideo (A)	Uruguay	0–3	Copa Juan Pinto Durán		—	
256	3 November 1971	Santiago (H)	Uruguay	5–0	Copa Juan Pinto Durán	Osorio, Pacheco, Araya, Crisosto, Vásquez	—	
257	26 January 1972	Estadio Jalisco, Guadalajara (A)	Mexico	0–2	Friendly		—	
258	9 February 1972	Port-au-Prince (A)	Haiti	0–1	Friendly		—	
259	31 May 1972	Estadio Nacional, Santiago (H)	Argentina	3–4	Copa Carlos Dittborn	Caszely, Valdés (2)	—	
260	14 June 1972	Machadão, Natal (N)	Ecuador	2–1	Brazil Independence Cup	Crisosto, Caszely	—	
261	18 June 1972	Estádio do Arruda, Recife (N)	Portugal	1–4	Brazil Independence Cup	Caszely	—	
262	21 June 1972	Estádio do Arruda, Recife (N)	Republic of Ireland	2–1	Brazil Independence Cup	Caszely, Fouillioux	—	
263	25 June 1972	Estádio do Arruda, Recife (N)	Iran	2–1	Brazil Independence Cup	Caszely (2)	—	
264	16 August 1972	Estadio Nacional, Santiago (H)	Mexico	0–2	Friendly		—	
265	27 September 1972	José Amalfitani Stadium, Buenos Aires (H)	Argentina	0–2	Copa Carlos Dittborn		—	
266	14 April 1973	Port-au-Prince (A)	Haiti	1–1	Friendly	Galleguillos	—	
267	21 April 1973	Mexico City (A)	Mexico	1–1	Friendly	Caszely	—	
268	24 April 1973	Guayaquil (A)	Ecuador	1–1	Friendly	Caszely	—	
269	29 April 1973	Estadio Nacional, Lima (A)	Peru	0–2	1974 FIFA World Cup qualification		42,947	
270	13 May 1973	Estadio Nacional, Santiago (H)	Peru	2–0	1974 FIFA World Cup qualification	Crisosto, Ahumada	69,881	
271	13 July 1973	Boca Juniors Stadium, Buenos Aires (A)	Argentina	4–5	Copa Carlos Dittborn	Crisosto, Caszely, Ahumada (2)	—	
272	18 July 1973	Estadio Nacional, Santiago (H)	Argentina	3–1	Copa Carlos Dittborn	Crisosto, Caszely (2)	—	
273	24 July 1973	Santiago (H)	Bolivia	3–0	Copa Provoste	Gamboa (2), Lillo	30,000	
274	5 August 1973	Estadio Centenario, Montevideo (N)	Peru	2–1	1974 FIFA World Cup qualification group play-off	Valdés, Farías	57,933	
275	20 September 1973	Estadio Azteca, Mexico City (A)	Mexico	2–1	Friendly	Caszely (2)	—	
276	26 September 1973	Central Lenin Stadium, Moscow (A)	Soviet Union	0–0	1974 FIFA World Cup qualification play-off		48,891	
277	21 November 1973	Estadio Nacional, Santiago (H)	Soviet Union	2–0	1974 FIFA World Cup qualification play-off	Valdés	15,000	
278	24 April 1974	Port-au-Prince (A)	Haiti	1–0	Friendly	García	—	
279	26 April 1974	Port-au-Prince (A)	Haiti	0–0	Friendly		—	
280	12 May 1974	Estadio Nacional, Santiago (H)	Republic of Ireland	1–2	Friendly	Gamboa	—	
281	14 June 1974	Olympiastadion, West Berlin (N)	West Germany	0–1	1974 FIFA World Cup		81,100	
282	18 June 1974	Olympiastadion, West Berlin (N)	East Germany	1–1	1974 FIFA World Cup	Ahumada	28,300	
283	22 June 1974	Olympiastadion, West Berlin (N)	Australia	0–0	1974 FIFA World Cup		17,400	
284	6 November 1974	Estadio Nacional, Santiago (H)	Argentina	0–2	Copa Carlos Dittborn		—	
285	20 November 1974	José Amalfitani Stadium, Buenos Aires (A)	Argentina	1–1	Copa Carlos Dittborn	Méndez	—	
286	22 December 1974	Santiago (H)	Paraguay	1–0	Friendly	Gamboa	—	
287	4 June 1975	Estadio Centenario, Montevideo (A)	Uruguay	0–1	Copa Juan Pinto Durán		—	
288	25 June 1975	Santiago (H)	Uruguay	1–3	Copa Juan Pinto Durán	Pinto	—	
289	17 July 1975	Estadio Nacional, Santiago (H)	Peru	1–1	1975 Copa América	Crisosto	50,000	
290	20 July 1975	Estadio Jesús Bermúdez, Oruro (A)	Bolivia	1–2	1975 Copa América	Gamboa	18,000	
291	13 August 1975	Estadio Nacional, Santiago (H)	Bolivia	4–0	1975 Copa América	Araneda (2), Ahumada, Gamboa	—	
292	20 August 1975	Estadio Alejandro Villanueva, Lima (A)	Peru	1–3	1975 Copa América	Reinoso	40,000	
293	6 October 1976	Santiago (H)	Uruguay	0–0	Copa Juan Pinto Durán		—	
294	13 October 1975	Estadio Nacional, Santiago (H)	Argentina	0–2	Copa Carlos Dittborn		—	
295	26 January 1977	Santiago (H)	Paraguay	4–0	Friendly	M. Rojas, Crisosto (3)	—	
296	30 January 1977	Estadio Centenario, Montevideo (A)	Uruguay	0–3	Copa Juan Pinto Durán		—	
297	2 February 1977	Asunción (A)	Paraguay	0–2	Friendly		—	
298	27 February 1977	Estadio Modelo, Guayaquil (A)	Ecuador	1–0	1978 FIFA World Cup qualification	Gamboa	51,200	
299	6 March 1977	Estadio Nacional, Santiago (H)	Peru	1–1	1978 FIFA World Cup qualification	Ahumada	67,983	
300	20 March 1977	Estadio Nacional, Santiago (H)	Ecuador	3–0	1978 FIFA World Cup qualification	Figueroa (2), Castro	15,571	
301	26 March 1977	Estadio Nacional, Lima (A)	Peru	0–2	1978 FIFA World Cup qualification		62,000	
302	15 June 1977	Estadio Nacional, Santiago (H)	Scotland	2–4	Friendly	Crisosto (2)	17,000	
303	13 June 1979	Santiago (H)	Ecuador	0–0	Friendly		—	
304	21 June 1979	Estadio Modelo, Guayaquil (A)	Ecuador	1–2	Friendly	Moscoso	—	
305	11 July 1979	Santiago (H)	Uruguay	1–0	Copa Juan Pinto Durán	Figueroa	—	
306	18 July 1979	Estadio Centenario, Montevideo (A)	Uruguay	1–2	Copa Juan Pinto Durán	Quiroz	—	
307	8 August 1979	Estadio Polideportivo de Pueblo Nuevo, San Cristóbal (A)	Venezuela	1–1	1979 Copa América	Peredo	14,000	
308	15 August 1979	Estadio El Campín, Bogotá (A)	Colombia	0–1	1979 Copa América		45,000	
309	29 August 1979	Estadio Nacional, Santiago (H)	Venezuela	7–0	1979 Copa América	Peredo (2), Rivas (2), Véliz, M. Soto, Yáñez	70,000	
310	5 September 1979	Estadio Nacional, Santiago (H)	Colombia	2–0	1979 Copa América	Caszely, Peredo	85,000	
311	17 October 1979	Estadio Nacional, Lima (A)	Peru	2–1	1979 Copa América	Caszely (2)	50,000	
312	24 October 1979	Estadio Nacional, Santiago (H)	Peru	0–0	1979 Copa América		75,000	
313	28 November 1979	Estadio Defensores del Chaco, Asunción (A)	Paraguay	0–3	1979 Copa América		40,000	
314	5 December 1979	Estadio Nacional, Santiago (H)	Paraguay	1–0	1979 Copa América	Rivas	55,000	
315	11 December 1979	José Amalfitani Stadium, Buenos Aires (N)	Paraguay	0–0 (a.e.t.)	1979 Copa América		6,000	

Notes

1. A: Chile were awarded a technical 2–0 win against the Soviet Union after the Soviets refused to travel to Chile following the 1973 Chilean coup d'état. The match began with only Chilean players on the pitch and lasted only 30 seconds, enough time to allow captain Francisco Valdés to score in the empty goal.

== Record by opponent ==
Team	Pld	W	D	L	GF	GA	GD	WPCT
Argentina	22	4	6	12	24	41	−17	18.18
Australia	1	0	1	0	0	0	0	0.00
Belgium	1	0	1	0	1	1	0	0.00
Bolivia	5	3	1	1	12	5	+7	60.00
Brazil	12	1	1	10	8	28	−20	8.33
Colombia	7	3	2	2	17	10	+7	42.86
East Germany	4	1	1	2	4	7	−3	25.00
Ecuador	11	6	4	1	20	10	+10	54.55
France	1	0	0	1	0	6	−6	0.00
Haiti	4	1	2	1	2	2	0	25.00
Hungary	3	1	1	1	9	6	+3	33.33
Iran	1	1	0	0	2	1	+1	100.00
Italy	2	1	0	1	2	2	0	50.00
Mexico	8	2	1	5	7	12	−5	25.00
North Korea	1	0	1	0	1	1	0	0.00
Paraguay	13	8	2	3	21	13	+8	61.54
Peru	16	8	4	4	22	16	+6	50.00
Portugal	1	0	0	1	1	4	−3	0.00
Republic of Ireland	3	1	0	2	3	5	−2	33.33
Scotland	1	0	0	1	2	4	−2	0.00
Soviet Union	7	2	1	4	6	10	−4	28.57
Spain	2	0	0	2	1	8	−7	0.00
Switzerland	2	1	0	1	5	5	0	50.00
Uruguay	18	2	7	9	19	28	−9	11.11
Venezuela	3	2	1	0	10	1	+9	66.67
Wales	1	1	0	0	2	0	+2	100.00
West Germany	5	2	0	3	6	7	−1	40.00
Yugoslavia	1	1	0	0	1	0	+1	100.00
Total	156	52	37	67	208	233	−25	33.33

Source: Results
