= Chile–Peru football rivalry =

International football rivalry

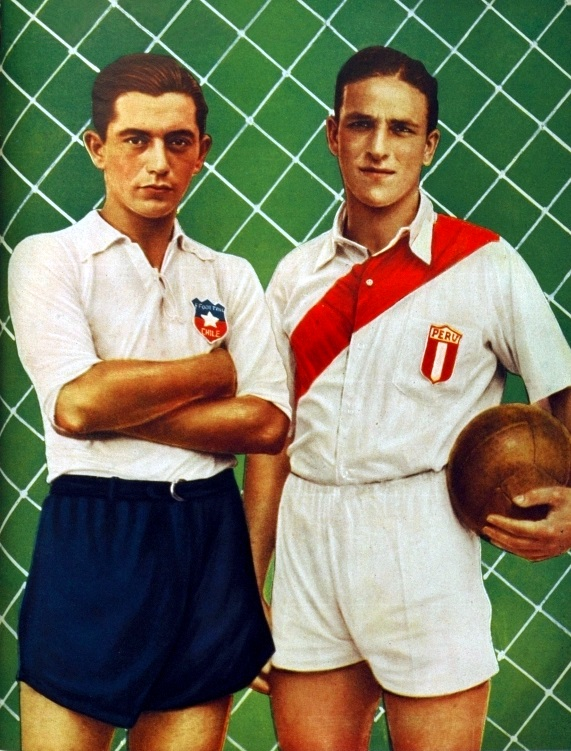
- Chile's Raúl Toro & Peru's Teodoro Fernandez, opponents in the 1937 Sudamericano
- Other names: Clásico del Pacífico (Spanish); Derby of the Pacific
- Location: CONMEBOL (South America)
- Teams: Chile; Peru
- First meeting: Peru 1–0 Chile; 1935 South American Championship (Lima, Peru; 26 January 1935)
- Latest meeting: Chile 2–1 Peru; Friendly (Krasnodar Krai, Russia; 17 November 2025)
- Next meeting: TBD

Statistics
- Total meetings: 88
- Most wins: Chile (48)
- Most player appearances: (Peru) Roberto Palacios (15)
- Top scorer: (Chile) Eduardo Vargas (7)
- Largest victory: Peru 6–0 Chile (Lima, Peru; April 19, 1995)

The Chile–Peru football rivalry, also known as the Clásico del Pacifico, is a long-standing association football rivalry between the national football teams of Peru and Chile and their respective aficionados. Both teams compete in FIFA's South American Football Confederation (CONMEBOL). Matches between the two nations are keenly contested and their games have a reputation for fierceness in and off the field of play, fueled by political disputes.

Sports media outlets have listed this rivalry, which is also known in Spanish as the Clásico del Pacífico (Pacific Derby), among the most competitive in association football. The derby's name refers to the Pacific Ocean, as both countries are neighbors in South America's Pacific coast, and the winner "earns bragging rights as the best team" in this side of the continent. According to sports historian Richard Henshaw, Chile and Peru traditionally compete with each other over the rank of fourth-best national team in South America (after Argentina, Brazil, and Uruguay, which are located in the continent's Atlantic side).

Although American journalists link the rivalry as a direct consequence of the War of the Pacific, Chilean historian Sebastián Salinas argues that the football rivalry between Chile and Peru is more recent, dating specifically to the centenary commemorations of the war in the 1970s. According to Salinas, the dictatorships of Augusto Pinochet in Chile and Francisco Morales Bermúdez in Peru promoted a nationalist animosity to these games to divert public attention. Moreover, the rise of football hooliganism, from the Argentine barra brava sports culture that influenced Chile and Peru in the 1980s, further intensified the rivalry.

Chile and Peru have played against each other 88 times in friendlies and tournament matches. Peru defeated Chile 1–0 in their first-ever encounter at the 1935 South American Championship held in Lima. Chile holds the records for most victories (48 wins) and top scorer (Eduardo Vargas, 7 goals). Peru holds the record for the largest victory margin (6–0), acquired in a friendly match played in 1995. Since 1953, both countries have sporadically contested the friendly Copa del Pacífico (Pacific Cup), which is a trophy awarded to the side with the best record after a two-legged home and away match.

== History ==
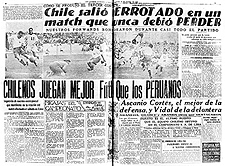
A newspaper from Chile laments its national team's loss to Peru in their first-ever match (Note: The image's title reads: "Chile salió DERROTADO en un match que nunca debió PERDER" (English: "Chile came out defeated in a match that it never deserved to lose"). A sub-heading further reads: "CHILENOS JUEGAN MEJOR Fútbol Que los PERUANOS" (English: "Chileans play better football than the Peruvians"))

The football rivalry between Chile and Peru has increased in intensity since the early twentieth century. Initially, the sports authorities from both countries attempted to use football as a way to foster friendly bilateral sociopolitical relations.

In 1933, a private enterprise by businessmen Waldo Sanhueza and Jack Gubbins saw the creation of the Combinado del Pacifico, a binational football team composed by Peruvian and Chilean footballers. The squad was initially composed by players from the Chilean club Colo-Colo and the Peruvian club Universitario de Deportes. After this squad was defeated 1-5 by Alianza Lima, another football club from the Peruvian capital, the team was reinforced by Alianza's goalkeeper Juan Valdivieso and creative forward Alejandro Villanueva.

Nowadays, Chile v. Peru games generally tend to be very competitive and at times rough, often with players sent off. The two teams display highly contested battles that make for entertaining matches within the CONMEBOL region.

In 2015, following a 2018 FIFA World Cup qualification match that resulted in a 3–4 Chilean victory over Peru in Lima, Chile's national team vandalized a dressing room in the Peruvian national stadium. The Chileans left behind a defiant message in the room's wall, "Respect! Through here passed America's champion!" (Respeto. Por aquí pasó el campeón de América), alluding to their victory at the 2015 Copa América.

In 2017, after Chile did not qualify to the World Cup finals, Chilean lawyers accused Peru of colluding with Colombia by drawing 1-1 to eliminate Chile; a complaint later dismissed by FIFA. When Peru reached the World Cup finals, after defeating New Zealand in the qualification play-offs, the Peruvian players celebrated with chants mocking Chile's elimination; an action deemed by El Mercurio, Chile's leading news outlet, as "provocative".

Chilean midfielder Marcelo Díaz and naturalized Chilean player-turned-coach Nelson Acosta have in the past dismissed the relevance of this football rivalry. In 2018, Chilean midfielder Arturo Vidal declared in an interview that no rivalry existed with Peru. In 2019, nonetheless, he declared in another interview a preference for playing against Peru, stating that "against Peru it's a derby, there is much football rivalry."

== National team records ==
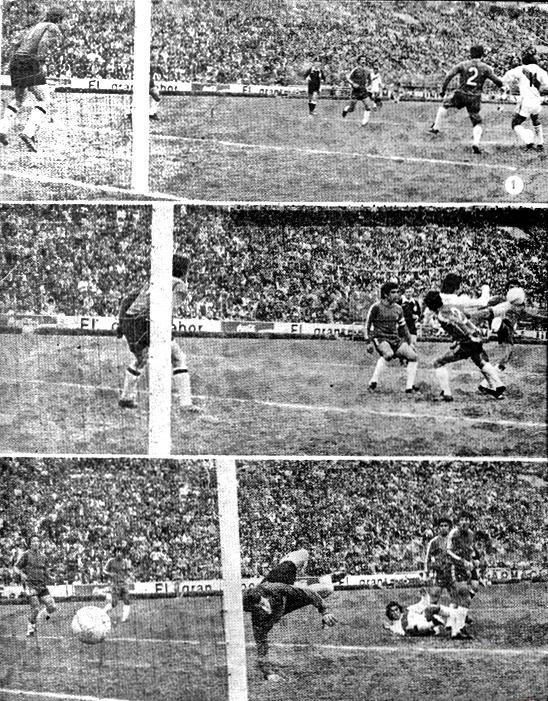
Peru's match against Chile at the 1975 Copa América

The national football teams of Chile and Peru have a rivalry that is known in Spanish as the Clásico del Pacífico ("Pacific Derby"). CNN World Sport editor Greg Duke ranks it among the top ten football rivalries in the world. The two countries traditionally compete with each other over the rank of fourth-best national team in South America (after Argentina, Brazil, and Uruguay). They also both claim to have invented the bicycle kick; Peruvians call it the chalaca, while it is the chilena in Chile and the rest of Latin America.

Both sides first faced each other in the 1935 South American Championship. Since 1953, both countries have sporadically contested the friendly Copa del Pacífico ("Pacific Cup"), which is a trophy awarded to the side with the best record after a two-legged home and away match. The first FIFA World Cup match between both teams took place in the qualification phase for the West Germany 1974 tournament. At present, Chile has a positive overall record against Peru in international football.

=== FIFA World Cup ===
The first time both sides played each other was in the qualification round for the West Germany 1974 tournament. Both teams were placed in CONMEBOL's Group 3, along with Venezuela. Following Venezuela's withdrawal from the tournament, the group became a contest between Peru and Chile. The first match was won by Peru on 29 April 1973.

=== Copa América ===
Peru and Chile first faced each other in the 1935 South American Championship, with Alberto Montellanos scoring the only goal of the match within 5 minutes resulting in a 1–0 win for the Peruvians. The two sides have played each other 21 times throughout the tournament, with Peru having seven wins, Chile with eight, and six draws.

Some notable matches include the 2015 semifinal, in which Carlos Zambrano was sent off after a tackle on Charles Aránguiz, Eduardo Vargas scoring twice, and Gary Medel scoring an own goal in a 2–1 win for La Roja to see them advance to the final, in which they were victorious against Argentina 4–1 on spot kicks. The Peruvians would get their revenge four years later in 2019, in a 3–0 win, with Edison Flores scoring, Gabriel Arias coming off his line and making a disastrous mistake, allowing Yoshimar Yotún to strike the ball into an empty net, and Paolo Guerrero tricking Arias to put in a third and send Los Incas into their first final since 1975.

== See also ==
- Chile–Peru relations
- Peruvians in Chile
- War of the Pacific

== Bibliography ==
- Henshaw, Richard (1979). The Encyclopedia of World Soccer. Washington, D.C.: New Republic Books. ISBN 0-915220-34-2.
- Witzig, Richard (2006). The Global Art of Soccer. Harahan: CusiBoy Publishing. ISBN 0-9776688-0-0.
