= Chile national football team results (2000–2019) =

This page details the match results and statistics of the Chile national football team from 2000 to 2019.

== Key ==
Key to matches

- Att.=Match attendance
- (H)=Home ground
- (A)=Away ground
- (N)=Neutral ground

Key to record by opponent

- Pld=Games played
- W=Games won
- D=Games drawn
- L=Games lost
- GF=Goals for
- GA=Goals against

== Results ==
Chile's score is shown first in each case.

No.	Date	Venue	Opponents	Score	Competition	Chile scorers	Att.	Ref.
517	29 January 2000	Estadio Francisco Rumoroso, Coquimbo (H)	United States	1–2	Friendly	Riveros	5,000	
518	2 February 2000	Estadio Ricardo Saprissa Aymá, San José (A)	Costa Rica	0–1	Friendly		15,000	
519	5 February 2000	Estadio Mateo Flores, Guatemala City (A)	Guatemala	1–2	Friendly	Queraltó	30,000	
520	9 February 2000	Estadio Playa Ancha, Valparaíso (N)	Australia	2–1	Copa Ciudad de Valparaíso	P. González, Navia	5,000	
521	12 February 2000	Estadio Playa Ancha, Valparaíso (N)	Bulgaria	3–2	Copa Ciudad de Valparaíso	Núñez (2), Sierra	5,000	
522	15 February 2000	Estadio Playa Ancha, Valparaíso (N)	Slovakia	0–2	Copa Ciudad de Valparaíso		3,000	
523	22 March 2000	Estadio Nacional, Santiago (H)	Honduras	5–2	Friendly	Tapia, Núñez (2), Tello, Pizarro	10,000	
524	29 March 2000	Estadio Monumental, Buenos Aires (A)	Argentina	1–4	2002 FIFA World Cup qualification	Tello	46,374	
525	26 April 2000	Estadio Nacional, Santiago (H)	Peru	1–1	2002 FIFA World Cup qualification	Margas	44,979	
526	3 June 2000	Estadio Centenario, Montevideo (A)	Uruguay	1–2	2002 FIFA World Cup qualification	Zamorano	50,000	
527	29 June 2000	Estadio Nacional, Santiago (H)	Paraguay	3–1	2002 FIFA World Cup qualification	Caniza (o.g.), Salas, Zamorano	53,570	
528	19 July 2000	Estadio Hernando Siles, La Paz (A)	Bolivia	0–1	2002 FIFA World Cup qualification		40,000	
529	25 July 2000	Estadio Polideportivo de Pueblo Nuevo, San Cristóbal (A)	Venezuela	2–0	2002 FIFA World Cup qualification	Tapia, Zamorano	20,000	
530	15 August 2000	Estadio Nacional, Santiago (H)	Brazil	3–0	2002 FIFA World Cup qualification	Estay, Zamorano, Salas	65,000	
531	2 September 2000	Estadio Nacional, Santiago (H)	Colombia	0–1	2002 FIFA World Cup qualification		63,946	
532	8 October 2000	Estadio Olímpico Atahualpa, Quito (A)	Ecuador	0–1	2002 FIFA World Cup qualification		35,000	
533	15 November 2000	Estadio Nacional, Santiago (H)	Argentina	0–2	2002 FIFA World Cup qualification		56,529	
534	21 March 2001	Estadio Olímpico Metropolitano, San Pedro Sula (A)	Honduras	1–3	Friendly	S. González	—	
535	27 March 2001	Estadio Nacional, Lima (A)	Peru	1–3	2002 FIFA World Cup qualification	Navia	35,000	
536	11 April 2001	Estadio Tecnológico, Monterrey (A)	Mexico	0–1	Friendly		40,000	
537	24 April 2001	Estadio Nacional, Santiago (H)	Uruguay	0–1	2002 FIFA World Cup qualification		55,528	
538	2 June 2001	Estadio Defensores del Chaco, Asunción (A)	Paraguay	0–1	2002 FIFA World Cup qualification		45,000	
539	11 July 2001	Estadio Metropolitano, Barranquilla (N)	Ecuador	4–1	2001 Copa América	Navia, Montecinos (2), Corrales	40,000	
540	14 July 2001	Estadio Metropolitano, Barranquilla (N)	Venezuela	1–0	2001 Copa América	Montecinos	33,000	
541	17 July 2001	Estadio Metropolitano, Barranquilla (N)	Colombia	0–2	2001 Copa América		50,000	
542	22 July 2001	Estadio Hernán Ramírez Villegas, Pereira (N)	Mexico	0–2	2001 Copa América		20,000	
543	14 August 2001	Estadio Nacional, Santiago (H)	Bolivia	2–2	2002 FIFA World Cup qualification	Salas (2)	34,657	
544	1 September 2001	Estadio Nacional, Santiago (H)	France	2–1	Friendly	Galdames, Navia	66,382	
545	4 September 2001	Estadio Nacional, Santiago (H)	Venezuela	0–2	2002 FIFA World Cup qualification		30,000	
546	7 October 2001	Estádio Couto Pereira, Curitiba (A)	Brazil	0–2	2002 FIFA World Cup qualification		52,000	
547	7 November 2001	Estadio El Campín, Bogotá (A)	Colombia	1–3	2002 FIFA World Cup qualification	Riveros	16,050	
548	14 November 2001	Estadio Nacional, Santiago (H)	Ecuador	0–0	2002 FIFA World Cup qualification		19,237	
549	17 April 2002	Parkstad Limburg Stadion, Kerkrade (N)	Turkey	0–2	Friendly		3,500	
550	30 March 2003	Estadio Nacional, Santiago (H)	Peru	2–0	Friendly	Mirošević, Pinilla	45,000	
551	2 April 2003	Estadio Nacional, Lima (A)	Peru	0–3	Friendly		20,000	
552	30 April 2003	Estadio Nacional, Santiago (H)	Costa Rica	1–0	Friendly	Contreras	8,618	
553	8 June 2003	Estadio Ricardo Saprissa Aymá, San José (A)	Costa Rica	0–1	Friendly		14,000	
554	11 June 2003	Estadio Olímpico Metropolitano, San Pedro Sula (A)	Honduras	2–1	Friendly	Tapia, Mark González	—	
555	20 August 2003	Minyuan Stadium, Tianjin (A)	China	0–0	Friendly		15,000	
556	6 September 2003	Estadio Monumental, Buenos Aires (A)	Argentina	2–2	2006 FIFA World Cup qualification	Mirošević, Navia	35,372	
557	9 September 2003	Estadio Nacional, Santiago (H)	Peru	2–1	2006 FIFA World Cup qualification	Pinilla, Norambuena	54,303	
558	15 November 2003	Estadio Centenario, Montevideo (A)	Uruguay	1–2	2006 FIFA World Cup qualification	Meléndez	60,000	
559	18 November 2003	Estadio Nacional, Santiago (H)	Paraguay	0–1	2006 FIFA World Cup qualification		61,923	
560	18 February 2004	Home Depot Center, Carson (N)	Mexico	1–1	Friendly	Navia	26,000	
561	30 March 2004	Estadio Hernando Siles, La Paz (A)	Bolivia	2–0	2006 FIFA World Cup qualification	Villarroel, Mark González	40,000	
562	28 April 2004	Estadio Regional, Antofagasta (H)	Peru	1–1	Friendly	L. Fuentes	32,000	
563	1 June 2004	Estadio Polideportivo de Pueblo Nuevo, San Cristóbal (A)	Venezuela	1–0	2006 FIFA World Cup qualification	Pinilla	23,040	
564	6 June 2004	Estadio Nacional, Santiago (H)	Brazil	1–1	2006 FIFA World Cup qualification	Navia	62,503	
565	8 July 2004	Estadio Monumental, Arequipa (N)	Brazil	0–1	2004 Copa América		35,000	
566	11 July 2004	Estadio Monumental, Arequipa (N)	Paraguay	1–1	2004 Copa América	S. González	15,000	
567	14 July 2004	Estadio Jorge Basadre, Tacna (N)	Costa Rica	1–2	2004 Copa América	Olarra	20,000	
568	5 September 2004	Estadio Nacional, Santiago (H)	Colombia	0–0	2006 FIFA World Cup qualification		62,523	
569	10 October 2004	Estadio Olímpico Atahualpa, Quito (A)	Ecuador	0–2	2006 FIFA World Cup qualification		27,956	
570	13 October 2004	Estadio Nacional, Santiago (H)	Argentina	0–0	2006 FIFA World Cup qualification		57,671	
571	17 November 2004	Estadio Nacional, Lima (A)	Peru	1–2	2006 FIFA World Cup qualification	S. González	39,752	
572	9 February 2005	Estadio Sausalito, Viña del Mar (H)	Ecuador	3–0	Friendly	Maldonado, Mark González, Pinilla	15,000	
573	26 March 2005	Estadio Nacional, Santiago (H)	Uruguay	1–1	2006 FIFA World Cup qualification	Mirošević	55,000	
574	30 March 2005	Estadio Defensores del Chaco, Asunción (A)	Paraguay	1–2	2006 FIFA World Cup qualification	L. Fuentes	10,000	
575	4 June 2005	Estadio Nacional, Santiago (H)	Bolivia	3–1	2006 FIFA World Cup qualification	L. Fuentes (2), Salas	46,729	
576	8 June 2005	Estadio Nacional, Santiago (H)	Venezuela	2–1	2006 FIFA World Cup qualification	Jiménez (2)	35,506	
577	17 August 2005	Estadio Jorge Basadre, Tacna (A)	Peru	1–3	Friendly	L. Fuentes	25,000	
578	4 September 2005	Estádio Nacional Mané Garrincha, Brasília (A)	Brazil	0–5	2006 FIFA World Cup qualification		39,000	
579	8 October 2005	Estadio Metropolitano, Barranquilla (A)	Colombia	1–1	2006 FIFA World Cup qualification	F. Rojas	22,380	
580	12 October 2005	Estadio Nacional, Santiago (H)	Ecuador	0–0	2006 FIFA World Cup qualification		49,530	
581	25 April 2006	Estadio El Teniente, Rancagua (H)	New Zealand	4–1	Friendly	Suazo, Christie (o.g.), Roco, E. Rubio	10,171	
582	27 April 2006	Estadio Fiscal de Talca, Talca (H)	New Zealand	1–0	Friendly	E. Rubio	6,171	
583	24 May 2006	Lansdowne Road, Dublin (A)	Republic of Ireland	1–0	Friendly	Iturra	36,171	
584	30 May 2006	Stade Jean-Bouloumie, Vittel (N)	Ivory Coast	1–1	Friendly	Suazo	10,000	
585	2 June 2006	Råsunda Stadium, Solna (A)	Sweden	1–1	Friendly	Suazo	34,735	
586	16 August 2006	Estadio Nacional, Santiago (H)	Colombia	1–2	Friendly	Suazo	20,000	
587	7 October 2006	Estadio Sausalito, Viña del Mar (H)	Peru	3–2	Copa del Pacífico	Fernández (2), Navia	20,000	
588	11 October 2006	Estadio Jorge Basadre, Tacna (A)	Peru	1–0	Copa del Pacífico	Navia	12,000	
589	15 November 2006	Estadio Sausalito, Viña del Mar (H)	Paraguay	3–2	Friendly	Ponce, Valdivia, Figueroa	—	
590	7 February 2007	Estadio José Pachencho Romero, Maracaibo	Venezuela	1–0	Friendly	Fernández	14,000	
591	24 March 2007	Ullevi, Gothenburg (N)	Brazil	0–4	Friendly		30,000	
592	28 March 2007	Estadio Fiscal de Talca, Talca (H)	Costa Rica	1–1	Friendly	Navia	—	
593	18 April 2007	Estadio Malvinas Argentinas, Mendoza (A)	Argentina	0–0	Friendly		60,000	
594	9 May 2007	Estadio Rubén Marcos Peralta, Osorno (H)	Cuba	3–0	Friendly	R. Gutiérrez, J. Rojas, Abarca	1,800	
595	16 May 2007	Estadio Municipal Germán Becker, Temuco (H)	Cuba	2–0	Friendly	R. Gutiérrez, D. González	35,000	
596	23 May 2007	Stade Sylvio Cator, Port-au-Prince (A)	Haiti	0–0	Friendly		12,000	
597	2 June 2007	Estadio Ricardo Saprissa Aymá, San José (A)	Costa Rica	0–2	Friendly		—	
598	5 June 2007	Independence Park, Kingston (A)	Jamaica	1–0	Friendly	Lorca	17,500	
599	27 June 2007	Polideportivo Cachamay, Ciudad Guayana (N)	Ecuador	3–2	2007 Copa América	Suazo (2), Villanueva	35,000	
600	1 July 2007	Estadio Monumental, Maturín (N)	Brazil	0–3	2007 Copa América		42,000	
601	4 July 2007	Estadio José Antonio Anzoátegui, Barcelona (N)	Mexico	0–0	2007 Copa América		30,000	
602	7 July 2007	Estadio José Antonio Anzoátegui, Barcelona (N)	Brazil	1–6	2007 Copa América	Suazo	25,000	
603	7 September 2007	Ernst-Happel-Stadion, Vienna (N)	Switzerland	1–2	Turnier der Kontinente	Sánchez	2,500	
604	11 September 2007	Ernst-Happel-Stadion, Vienna (N)	Austria	2–0	Turnier der Kontinente	Droguett, E. Rubio	14,500	
605	13 October 2007	Estadio Monumental, Buenos Aires (A)	Argentina	0–2	2010 FIFA World Cup qualification		55,000	
606	17 October 2007	Estadio Nacional, Santiago (H)	Peru	2–0	2010 FIFA World Cup qualification	Suazo, Fernández	58,000	
607	18 November 2007	Estadio Centenario, Montevideo (A)	Uruguay	2–2	2010 FIFA World Cup qualification	Salas (2)	35,000	
608	21 November 2007	Estadio Nacional, Santiago (H)	Paraguay	0–3	2010 FIFA World Cup qualification		52,320	
609	26 January 2008	National Stadium, Tokyo (A)	Japan	0–0	Friendly		37,261	
610	30 January 2008	Seoul World Cup Stadium, Seoul (A)	South Korea	1–0	Friendly	Fierro	—	
611	26 March 2008	Ramat Gan Stadium, Ramat Gan (A)	Israel	0–1	Friendly		—	
612	4 June 2008	Estadio El Teniente, Rancagua (H)	Guatemala	2–0	Friendly	Sánchez (2)	—	
613	7 June 2008	Estadio Elías Figueroa Brander, Valparaíso (H)	Panama	0–0	Friendly		—	
614	15 June 2008	Estadio Hernando Siles, La Paz (A)	Bolivia	2–0	2010 FIFA World Cup qualification	Medel (2)	27,722	
615	19 June 2008	Estadio José Antonio Anzoátegui, Barcelona (A)	Venezuela	3–2	2010 FIFA World Cup qualification	Suazo (2), Jara	38,000	
616	20 August 2008	İzmit İsmetpaşa Stadium, İzmit (A)	Turkey	0–1	Friendly		—	
617	7 September 2008	Estadio Nacional, Santiago (H)	Brazil	0–3	2010 FIFA World Cup qualification		60,239	
618	10 September 2008	Estadio Nacional, Santiago (H)	Colombia	4–0	2010 FIFA World Cup qualification	Jara, Suazo, I. Fuentes, Fernández	47,459	
619	24 September 2008	Los Angeles Memorial Coliseum, Los Angeles (N)	Mexico	1–0	Friendly	Valenzuela (o.g.)	—	
620	12 October 2008	Estadio Olímpico Atahualpa, Quito (A)	Ecuador	0–1	2010 FIFA World Cup qualification		33,079	
621	15 October 2008	Estadio Nacional, Santiago (H)	Argentina	1–0	2010 FIFA World Cup qualification	Orellana	65,000	
622	19 November 2008	El Madrigal, Villarreal (A)	Spain	0–3	Friendly		15,000	
623	18 January 2009	Lockhart Stadium, Fort Lauderdale (N)	Honduras	0–2	Friendly		—	
624	11 February 2009	Pietersburg Stadium, Polokwane (A)	South Africa	2–0	Friendly	Valdivia, Sánchez	—	
625	29 March 2009	Estadio Monumental, Lima (A)	Peru	3–1	2010 FIFA World Cup qualification	Sánchez, Suazo, Fernández	48,700	
626	1 April 2009	Estadio Nacional, Santiago (H)	Uruguay	0–0	2010 FIFA World Cup qualification		55,000	
627	27 May 2009	Nagai Stadium, Osaka (N)	Japan	0–4	Kirin Cup		43,531	
628	29 May 2009	Fukuda Denshi Arena, Chiba (N)	Belgium	1–1	Kirin Cup	Medel	6,050	
629	6 June 2009	Estadio Defensores del Chaco, Asunción (A)	Paraguay	2–0	2010 FIFA World Cup qualification	Fernández, Suazo	34,000	
630	10 June 2009	Estadio Nacional, Santiago (H)	Bolivia	4–0	2010 FIFA World Cup qualification	Beausejour, Estrada, Sánchez (2)	60,214	
631	12 August 2009	Brøndby Stadion, Copenhagen (A)	Denmark	2–1	Friendly	E. Paredes, Sánchez	8,700	
632	5 September 2009	Estadio Monumental, Santiago (H)	Venezuela	2–2	2010 FIFA World Cup qualification	Vidal, Millar	44,000	
633	9 September 2009	Estádio de Pituaçu, Salvador (A)	Brazil	2–4	2010 FIFA World Cup qualification	Suazo (2)	30,000	
634	10 October 2009	Atanasio Girardot Sports Complex, Medellín (A)	Colombia	4–2	2010 FIFA World Cup qualification	Ponce, Suazo, Valdivia, Orellana	18,000	
635	14 October 2009	Estadio Monumental, Santiago (H)	Ecuador	1–0	2010 FIFA World Cup qualification	Suazo	47,000	
636	4 November 2009	Estadio CAP, Talcahuano (H)	Paraguay	2–1	Friendly	R. González, E. Paredes	10,000	
637	17 November 2009	Štadión pod Dubňom, Žilina (A)	Slovakia	2–1	Friendly	Jara, E. Paredes	11,072	
638	20 January 2010	Estadio Francisco Rumoroso, Coquimbo (H)	Panama	2–1	Friendly	E. Paredes (2)	—	
639	31 March 2010	Estadio Municipal Germán Becker, Temuco (H)	Venezuela	0–0	Friendly		20,000	
640	5 May 2010	Estadio Tierra de Campeones, Iquique (H)	Trinidad and Tobago	2–0	Friendly	Morales, Toro	10,000	
641	16 May 2010	Estadio Azteca, Mexico City (A)	Mexico	0–1	Friendly		95,000	
642	26 May 2010	Estadio Municipal, Calama (H)	Zambia	3–0	Friendly	Sánchez (2), Valdivia	20,000	
643	30 May 2010	Estadio Municipal Nelson Oyarzún Arenas, Chillán (H)	Northern Ireland	1–0	Friendly	E. Paredes	12,000	
644	30 May 2010	Estadio Ester Roa, Concepción (H)	Israel	3–0	Friendly	Suazo, Sánchez, Tello	—	
645	16 June 2010	Mbombela Stadium, Mbombela (N)	Honduras	1–0	2010 FIFA World Cup	Beausejour	32,664	
646	21 June 2010	Nelson Mandela Bay Stadium, Port Elizabeth (N)	Switzerland	1–0	2010 FIFA World Cup	Mark González	34,872	
647	25 June 2010	Loftus Versfeld Stadium, Pretoria (N)	Spain	1–2	2010 FIFA World Cup	Piqué (o.g.)	41,958	
648	28 June 2010	Ellis Park Stadium, Johannesburg (N)	Brazil	0–3	2010 FIFA World Cup		54,096	
649	7 September 2010	Dynamo Stadium, Kyiv (A)	Ukraine	1–2	Friendly	Isla	10,000	
650	9 October 2010	Zayed Sports City Stadium, Abu Dhabi (A)	United Arab Emirates	2–0	Friendly	Cereceda, Morales	—	
651	12 October 2010	Sultan Qaboos Sports Complex, Muscat (A)	Oman	1–0	Friendly	Morales	—	
652	17 November 2010	Estadio Monumental, Santiago (H)	Uruguay	2–0	Friendly	Sánchez, Vidal	45,017	
653	22 January 2011	Home Depot Center, Carson (A)	United States	1–1	Friendly	E. Paredes	18,580	
654	26 March 2011	Estádio Dr. Magalhães Pessoa, Leiria (A)	Portugal	1–1	Friendly	Fernández	10,694	
655	29 March 2011	ADO Den Haag Stadium, The Hague (N)	Colombia	2–0	Friendly	Fernández, Beausejour	—	
656	19 June 2011	Estadio Monumental, Santiago (H)	Estonia	4–0	Friendly	Fernández, Ponce, Suazo, Sánchez	—	
657	23 June 2011	Estadio Defensores del Chaco, Asunción (A)	Paraguay	0–0	Friendly		—	
658	4 July 2011	Estadio del Bicentenario, San Juan (N)	Mexico	2–1	2011 Copa América	E. Paredes, Vidal	25,000	
659	8 July 2011	Estadio Malvinas Argentinas, Mendoza (N)	Uruguay	1–1	2011 Copa América	Sánchez	45,000	
660	12 July 2011	Estadio Malvinas Argentinas, Mendoza (N)	Peru	1–0	2011 Copa América	Carrillo (o.g.)	42,000	
661	17 July 2011	Estadio del Bicentenario, Suan Juan (N)	Venezuela	1–2	2011 Copa América	Suazo	23,000	
662	10 August 2011	Stade de la Mosson, Montpellier (A)	France	1–1	Friendly	Córdova	—	
663	2 September 2011	Kybunpark, St. Gallen (N)	Spain	2–3	Friendly	Isla, Vargas	14,605	
664	4 September 2011	Estadi Cornellà-El Prat, Barcelona (N)	Mexico	0–1	Friendly		—	
665	7 October 2011	Estadio Monumental, Buenos Aires (A)	Argentina	1–4	2014 FIFA World Cup qualification	Fernández	26,161	
666	11 October 2011	Estadio Monumental, Santiago (H)	Peru	4–2	2014 FIFA World Cup qualification	Ponce, Vargas, Medel, Suazo	39,000	
667	11 November 2011	Estadio Centenario, Montevideo (A)	Uruguay	0–4	2014 FIFA World Cup qualification		40,500	
668	15 November 2011	Estadio Nacional, Santiago (H)	Paraguay	2–0	2014 FIFA World Cup qualification	Contreras, Campos	44,726	
669	21 December 2011	Estadio La Portada, La Serena (H)	Paraguay	3–2	Friendly	Pinto (3)	—	
670	15 February 2012	Estadio Feliciano Cáceres, Luque (A)	Paraguay	0–2	Friendly		—	
671	29 February 2012	PPL Park, Chester (N)	Ghana	1–1	Friendly	Fernández	—	
672	21 March 2012	Estadio Carlos Dittborn, Arica (H)	Peru	3–1	Copa del Pacífico	E. Paredes, Roco, Mena	—	
673	11 April 2012	Estadio Jorge Basadre, Tacna (A)	Peru	3–0	Copa del Pacífico	Mena, Flores, Carrasco	—	
674	2 June 2012	Estadio Hernando Siles, La Paz (A)	Bolivia	2–0	2014 FIFA World Cup qualification	Aránguiz, Vidal	34,389	
675	9 June 2012	Estadio José Antonio Anzoátegui, Barcelona (A)	Venezuela	2–0	2014 FIFA World Cup qualification	Fernández, Aránguiz	35,000	
676	15 August 2012	Citi Field, New York City (N)	Ecuador	0–3	Friendly		—	
677	11 September 2012	Estadio Monumental, Santiago (H)	Colombia	1–3	2014 FIFA World Cup qualification	Fernández	38,000	
678	12 October 2012	Estadio Olímpico Atahualpa, Quito (A)	Ecuador	1–3	2014 FIFA World Cup qualification	J. C. Paredes (o.g.)	32,600	
679	16 October 2012	Estadio Nacional, Santiago (H)	Argentina	1–2	2014 FIFA World Cup qualification	F. Gutiérrez	45,000	
680	14 November 2012	Kybunpark, St. Gallen (N)	Serbia	1–3	Friendly	Henríquez	—	
681	19 January 2013	Estadio Ester Roa, Concepción (H)	Haiti	3–0	Friendly	Muñoz, Fuenzalida, P. Rubio	—	
682	6 February 2013	Vicente Calderón Stadium, Madrid (N)	Egypt	2–1	Friendly	Vargas, Carmona	3,000	
683	22 March 2013	Estadio Nacional, Lima (A)	Peru	0–1	2014 FIFA World Cup qualification		60,081	
684	26 March 2013	Estadio Nacional, Santiago (H)	Uruguay	2–0	2014 FIFA World Cup qualification	Paredes, Vargas	43,816	
685	24 April 2013	Mineirão, Belo Horizonte (A)	Brazil	2–2	Friendly	Marcos González, Vargas	53,331	
686	7 June 2013	Estadio Defensores del Chaco, Asunción (A)	Paraguay	2–1	2014 FIFA World Cup qualification	Vargas, Vidal	30,000	
687	11 June 2013	Estadio Nacional, Santiago (H)	Bolivia	3–1	2014 FIFA World Cup qualification	Vargas, Sánchez, Vidal	45,000	
688	14 August 2013	Brøndby Stadion, Copenhagen (N)	Iraq	6–0	Friendly	Mena, Sánchez (2), Beausejour (2), Henríquez	—	
689	6 September 2013	Estadio Nacional, Santiago (H)	Venezuela	3–0	2014 FIFA World Cup qualification	Vargas, Marcos González, Vidal	46,500	
690	10 September 2013	Stade de Genève, Geneva (N)	Spain	2–2	Friendly	Vargas (2)	15,635	
691	11 October 2013	Estadio Metropolitano, Barranquilla (A)	Colombia	3–3	2014 FIFA World Cup qualification	Vidal, Sánchez (2)	40,388	
692	15 October 2013	Estadio Nacional, Santiago (H)	Ecuador	2–1	2014 FIFA World Cup qualification	Sánchez, Medel	47,458	
693	15 November 2013	Wembley Stadium, London (A)	England	2–0	Friendly	Sánchez (2)	62,693	
694	19 November 2013	Rogers Centre, Toronto (N)	Brazil	1–2	Friendly	Vargas	30,000	
695	22 January 2014	Estadio Francisco Rumoroso, Coquimbo (H)	Costa Rica	4–0	Friendly	Albornoz, Hernández (2), Muñoz	17,000	
696	5 March 2014	Mercedes-Benz Arena, Stuttgart (A)	Germany	0–1	Friendly		54,449	
697	30 May 2014	Estadio Nacional, Santiago (H)	Egypt	3–2	Friendly	Díaz, Vargas (2)	—	
698	4 June 2014	Estadio Elías Figueroa Brander, Valparaíso (H)	Northern Ireland	2–0	Friendly	Vargas, Pinilla	—	
699	13 June 2014	Arena Pantanal, Cuiabá (N)	Australia	3–1	2014 FIFA World Cup	Sánchez, Valdivia, Beausejour	40,275	
700	18 June 2014	Maracanã Stadium, Rio de Janeiro (N)	Spain	2–0	2014 FIFA World Cup	Vargas, Aránguiz	74,101	
701	23 June 2014	Arena Corinthians, São Paulo (N)	Netherlands	0–2	2014 FIFA World Cup		62,996	
702	28 June 2014	Mineirão, Belo Horizonte (N)	Brazil	1–1 (a.e.t.) (2–3p)	2014 FIFA World Cup	Sánchez	57,714	
703	6 September 2014	Levi's Stadium, Santa Clara (N)	Mexico	0–0	Friendly		67,175	
704	9 September 2014	Lockhart Stadium, Fort Lauderdale (N)	Haiti	1–0	Friendly	Delgado	15,000	
705	10 October 2014	Estadio Elías Figueroa Brander, Valparaíso (H)	Peru	3–0	Friendly	Vargas (2), Medel	—	
706	14 October 2014	Estadio Regional, Antofagasta (H)	Bolivia	2–2	Friendly	Aránguiz, Vidal	—	
707	14 November 2014	Estadio CAP, Talcahuano (H)	Venezuela	5–0	Friendly	Sánchez, Valdivia, Vargas, Millar, Hernández	—	
708	18 November 2014	Estadio Monumental, Santiago (H)	Uruguay	1–2	Friendly	Sánchez	—	
709	28 January 2014	Estadio El Teniente, Rancagua (H)	United States	3–2	Friendly	R. Gutiérrez, Mark González (2)	12,420	
710	26 March 2015	NV Arena, Sankt Pölten (N)	Iran	0–2	Friendly		—	
711	29 March 2015	Emirates Stadium, London (N)	Brazil	0–1	Friendly		60,007	
712	5 June 2015	Estadio El Teniente, Rancagua (H)	El Salvador	1–0	Friendly	Valdivia	8,500	
713	11 June 2015	Estadio Nacional, Santiago (N)	Ecuador	2–0	2015 Copa América	Vidal, Vargas	46,000	
714	15 June 2015	Estadio Nacional, Santiago (N)	Mexico	3–3	2015 Copa América	Vidal (2), Vargas	45,583	
715	19 June 2015	Estadio Nacional, Santiago (N)	Bolivia	5–0	2015 Copa América	Aránguiz (2), Sánchez, Medel, Raldes (o.g.)	45,601	
716	24 June 2015	Estadio Nacional, Santiago (N)	Uruguay	1–0	2015 Copa América	Isla	45,304	
717	29 June 2015	Estadio Nacional, Santiago (N)	Peru	2–1	2015 Copa América	Vargas (2)	45,651	
718	4 July 2015	Estadio Nacional, Santiago (N)	Argentina	0–0 (a.e.t.) (4–1p)	2015 Copa América		45,693	
719	5 September 2015	Estadio Nacional, Santiago (H)	Paraguay	3–2	Friendly	F. Gutiérrez (2), Sánchez	25,000	
720	8 October 2015	Estadio Nacional, Santiago (H)	Brazil	2–0	2018 FIFA World Cup qualification	Vargas, Sánchez	42,150	
721	13 October 2015	Estadio Nacional, Lima (A)	Peru	4–3	2018 FIFA World Cup qualification	Sánchez (2), Vargas (2)	39,180	
722	12 November 2015	Estadio Nacional, Santiago (H)	Colombia	1–1	2018 FIFA World Cup qualification	Vidal	45,316	
723	17 November 2015	Estadio Centenario, Montevideo (A)	Uruguay	0–3	2018 FIFA World Cup qualification		58,000	
724	24 March 2016	Estadio Nacional, Santiago (H)	Argentina	1–2	2018 FIFA World Cup qualification	F. Gutiérrez	44,536	
725	29 March 2016	Estadio Agustín Tovar, Barinas (A)	Venezuela	4–1	2018 FIFA World Cup qualification	Pinilla (2), Vidal (2)	24,101	
726	27 May 2016	Estadio Sausalito, Viña del Mar (H)	Jamaica	1–2	Friendly	Castillo	—	
727	1 June 2016	San Diego Stadium, San Diego (N)	Mexico	0–1	Friendly		—	
728	6 June 2016	Levi's Stadium, Santa Clara (N)	Argentina	1–2	Copa América Centenario	Fuenzalida	69,451	
729	10 June 2016	Gillette Stadium, Foxborough (N)	Bolivia	2–1	Copa América Centenario	Vidal (2)	19,392	
730	14 June 2016	Lincoln Financial Field, Philadelphia	Panama	4–2	Copa América Centenario	Vargas (2), Sánchez (2)	27,260	
731	18 June 2016	Levi's Stadium, Santa Clara (N)	Mexico	7–0	Copa América Centenario	Puch (2), Vargas (4), Sánchez	70,547	
732	22 June 2016	Soldier Field, Chicago (N)	Colombia	2–0	Copa América Centenario	Aránguiz, Fuenzalida	55,423	
733	26 June 2016	MetLife Stadium, East Rutherford (N)	Argentina	0–0 (a.e.t.) (4–2p)	Copa América Centenario		82,026	
734	1 September 2016	Estadio Defensores del Chaco, Asunción (A)	Paraguay	1–2	2018 FIFA World Cup qualification	Vidal	25,000	
735	6 September 2016	Estadio Monumental, Santiago (H)	Bolivia	3–0	2018 FIFA World Cup qualification		40,000	
736	6 October 2016	Estadio Olímpico Atahualpa, Quito (A)	Ecuador	0–3	2018 FIFA World Cup qualification		30,000	
737	11 October 2016	Estadio Nacional, Santiago (H)	Peru	2–1	2018 FIFA World Cup qualification	Vidal (2)	38,662	
738	10 November 2016	Estadio Metropolitano, Barranquilla (A)	Colombia	0–0	2018 FIFA World Cup qualification		45,916	
739	15 November 2016	Estadio Nacional, Santiago (H)	Uruguay	3–1	2018 FIFA World Cup qualification	Vargas, Sánchez (2)	46,111	
740	11 January 2017	Guangxi Sports Center, Nanning (N)	Croatia	1–1 (4–1p)	2017 China Cup	Pinares	6,686	
741	15 January 2017	Guangxi Sports Center, Nanning (N)	Iceland	1–0	2017 China Cup	Sagal	26,335	
742	23 March 2017	Estadio Monumental, Buenos Aires (A)	Argentina	0–1	2018 FIFA World Cup qualification		55,000	
743	28 March 2017	Estadio Monumental, Santiago (H)	Venezuela	3–1	2018 FIFA World Cup qualification	Sánchez, Paredes (2)	34,136	
744	2 June 2017	Estadio Nacional, Santiago (H)	Burkina Faso	3–0	Friendly	Vidal (2), Sagal	27,000	
745	9 June 2017	VEB Arena, Moscow (A)	Russia	1–1	Friendly	Isla	—	
746	13 June 2017	Cluj Arena, Cluj-Napoca (A)	Romania	2–3	Friendly	Vargas, Valencia	9,000	
747	18 June 2017	Otkritie Arena, Moscow (N)	Cameroon	2–0	2017 FIFA Confederations Cup	Vidal, Vargas	33,492	
748	22 June 2017	Kazan Arena, Kazan (N)	Germany	1–1	2017 FIFA Confederations Cup	Sánchez	38,222	
749	25 June 2017	Otkritie Arena, Moscow (N)	Australia	1–1	2017 FIFA Confederations Cup	Rodríguez	33,839	
750	28 June 2017	Kazan Arena, Kazan (N)	Portugal	0–0 (a.e.t.) (3–0p)	2017 FIFA Confederations Cup		40,855	
751	2 July 2017	Krestovsky Stadium, Saint Petersburg (N)	Germany	0–1	2017 FIFA Confederations Cup		57,268	
752	31 August 2017	Estadio Monumental, Santiago (H)	Paraguay	0–3	2018 FIFA World Cup qualification		43,000	
753	5 September 2017	Estadio Hernando Siles, La Paz (A)	Bolivia	0–1	2018 FIFA World Cup qualification		31,555	
754	5 October 2017	Estadio Monumental, Santiago (H)	Ecuador	2–1	2018 FIFA World Cup qualification	Vargas, Sánchez	45,000	
755	10 October 2017	Allianz Parque, São Paulo (H)	Brazil	0–3	2018 FIFA World Cup qualification		46,008	
756	24 March 2018	Friends Arena, Stockholm (A)	Sweden	2–1	Friendly	Vidal, Bolados	48,134	
757	27 March 2018	Aalborg Stadium, Aalborg (A)	Denmark	0–0	Friendly		11,527	
758	31 May 2018	Sportzentrum Graz-Weinzödl, Graz (N)	Romania	2–3	Friendly	Maripán, Reyes	4,500	
759	4 June 2018	Liebenauer Stadium, Graz (N)	Serbia	1–0	Friendly	Maripán	1,700	
760	8 June 2018	Stadion Poznań, Poznań (A)	Poland	2–2	Friendly	Valdés, Albornoz	—	
761	11 September 2018	Busan Asiad Main Stadium, Busan (A)	South Korea	0–0	Friendly		40,127	
762	12 October 2018	Hard Rock Stadium, Miami Gardens (N)	Peru	0–3	Friendly		35,000	
763	16 October 2018	Estadio Corregidora, Querétaro City (A)	Mexico	1–0	Friendly	Castillo	33,000	
764	16 November 2018	Estadio El Teniente, Rancagua (H)	Costa Rica	2–3	Friendly	Vegas, Sánchez	9,000	
765	20 November 2018	Estadio Municipal Germán Becker, Temuco (H)	Honduras	4–1	Friendly	Vidal (2), Sánchez, Castillo	17,000	
766	22 March 2019	San Diego Stadium, San Diego (N)	Mexico	1–3	Friendly	Castillo	49,617	
767	26 March 2019	BBVA Stadium, Houston (A)	United States	1–1	Friendly	Opazo	18,033	
768	6 June 2019	Estadio La Portada, La Serena (H)	Haiti	2–1	Friendly	Vargas, Fuenzalida	—	
769	17 June 2019	Estádio do Morumbi, São Paulo (N)	Japan	4–0	2019 Copa América	Pulgar, Vargas (2), Sánchez	23,253	
770	21 June 2019	Arena Fonte Nova, Salvador (N)	Ecuador	2–1	2019 Copa América	Fuenzalida, Sánchez	14,727	
771	24 June 2019	Maracanã Stadium, Rio de Janeiro (N)	Uruguay	0–1	2019 Copa América		57,442	
772	28 June 2019	Arena Corinthians, São Paulo (N)	Colombia	0–0 (5–4p)	2019 Copa América		44,062	
773	3 July 2019	Arena do Grêmio, Porto Alegre (N)	Peru	0–3	2019 Copa América		33,058	
774	6 July 2019	Arena Corinthians, São Paulo (N)	Argentina	1–2	2019 Copa América	Vidal	44,269	
775	5 September 2019	Los Angeles Memorial Coliseum, Los Angeles (N)	Argentina	0–0	Friendly		—	
776	10 September 2019	Estadio Olímpico Metropolitano, San Pedro Sula (A)	Honduras	1–2	Friendly	Parot	—	
777	12 October 2019	Estadio José Rico Pérez, Alicante (N)	Colombia	0–0	Friendly		—	
778	15 October 2019	Estadio José Rico Pérez, Alicante (N)	Guinea	3–2	Friendly	Meneses, Mora, Vidal	—	

Notes

1. A: Chile were awarded a technical 3–0 win after Bolivia fielded the ineligible player Nelson Cabrera. The match had originally finished 0–0.

== Record by opponent ==
Team	Pld	W	D	L	GF	GA	GD	WPCT
Argentina	16	1	6	9	9	23	−14	6.25
Australia	3	2	1	0	6	3	+3	66.67
Austria	1	1	0	0	2	0	+2	100.00
Belgium	1	0	1	0	1	1	0	0.00
Bolivia	13	9	2	2	30	9	+21	69.23
Brazil	17	2	3	12	16	38	−22	11.76
Bulgaria	1	1	0	0	3	2	+1	100.00
Burkina Faso	1	1	0	0	3	0	+3	100.00
Cameroon	1	1	0	0	2	0	+2	100.00
China	1	0	1	0	0	0	0	0.00
Colombia	16	4	7	5	20	18	+2	25.00
Costa Rica	8	2	1	5	9	10	−1	25.00
Croatia	1	0	1	0	1	1	0	0.00
Cuba	2	2	0	0	5	0	+5	100.00
Denmark	2	1	1	0	2	1	+1	50.00
Ecuador	16	8	2	6	20	19	+1	50.00
Egypt	2	2	0	0	5	3	+2	100.00
El Salvador	1	1	0	0	1	0	+1	100.00
England	1	1	0	0	2	0	+2	100.00
Estonia	1	1	0	0	4	0	+4	100.00
France	2	1	1	0	3	2	+1	50.00
Ghana	1	0	1	0	1	1	0	0.00
Germany	3	0	1	2	1	3	−2	0.00
Guatemala	2	1	0	1	3	2	+1	50.00
Guinea	1	1	0	0	3	2	+1	100.00
Haiti	4	3	1	0	6	1	+5	75.00
Honduras	7	4	0	3	14	11	+3	57.14
Iceland	1	1	0	0	1	0	+1	100.00
Iran	1	0	0	1	0	2	−2	0.00
Iraq	1	1	0	0	6	0	+6	100.00
Israel	2	1	0	1	3	1	+2	50.00
Ivory Coast	1	0	1	0	1	1	0	0.00
Jamaica	2	1	0	1	2	2	0	50.00
Japan	3	1	1	1	4	4	0	33.33
Mexico	14	4	4	6	16	14	+2	28.57
Netherlands	1	0	0	1	0	2	−2	0.00
New Zealand	2	2	0	0	5	1	+4	100.00
Northern Ireland	2	2	0	0	3	0	+3	100.00
Oman	1	1	0	0	1	0	+1	100.00
Panama	3	2	1	0	6	3	+3	66.67
Paraguay	18	9	2	7	25	25	0	50.00
Peru	22	12	2	8	38	32	+6	54.55
Poland	1	0	1	0	2	2	0	0.00
Portugal	2	0	2	0	1	1	0	0.00
Republic of Ireland	1	1	0	0	1	0	+1	100.00
Romania	2	0	0	2	4	6	−2	0.00
Russia	1	0	1	0	1	1	0	0.00
Serbia	2	1	0	1	2	3	−1	50.00
Slovakia	2	1	0	1	2	3	−1	50.00
South Africa	1	1	0	0	2	0	+2	100.00
South Korea	2	1	1	0	1	0	+1	50.00
Spain	5	1	1	3	7	10	−3	20.00
Sweden	2	1	1	0	3	2	+1	50.00
Switzerland	2	1	0	1	2	2	0	50.00
Trinidad and Tobago	1	1	0	0	2	0	+2	100.00
Turkey	2	0	0	2	0	3	−3	0.00
Ukraine	1	0	0	1	1	2	−1	0.00
United Arab Emirates	1	1	0	0	2	0	+2	100.00
United States	4	1	2	1	6	6	0	25.00
Uruguay	15	4	4	7	15	20	−5	26.67
Venezuela	15	11	2	2	30	11	+19	73.33
Zambia	1	1	0	0	3	0	+3	100.00
Total	262	114	56	92	370	309	+61	43.51

Source: Results
