= Chile national football team results (2020–present) =

This page details the match results and statistics of the Chile national football team from 2020 to present.

== Key ==
Key to matches

- Att.=Match attendance
- (H)=Home ground
- (A)=Away ground
- (N)=Neutral ground

Key to record by opponent

- Pld=Games played
- W=Games won
- D=Games drawn
- L=Games lost
- GF=Goals for
- GA=Goals against

== Results ==
Chile's score is shown first in each case.

No.	Date	Venue	Opponents	Score	Competition	Chile scorers	Att.	Ref.
779	8 October 2020	Estadio Centenario, Montevideo (A)	Uruguay	1–2	2022 FIFA World Cup qualification	Sánchez	0	
780	13 October 2020	Estadio Nacional, Santiago (H)	Colombia	2–2	2022 FIFA World Cup qualification	Vidal, Sánchez	0	
781	13 November 2020	Estadio Nacional, Santiago (H)	Peru	2–0	2022 FIFA World Cup qualification	Vidal (2)	0	
782	17 November 2020	Olympic Stadium, Caracas (A)	Venezuela	1–2	2022 FIFA World Cup qualification	Vidal	0	
783	26 March 2021	Estadio El Teniente, Rancagua (H)	Bolivia	2–1	Friendly	Jiménez, Meneses	0	
784	3 June 2021	Estadio Único Madre de Ciudades, Santiago del Estero (A)	Argentina	1–1	2022 FIFA World Cup qualification	Sánchez	0	
785	8 June 2021	Estadio San Carlos de Apoquindo, Santiago (H)	Bolivia	1–1	2022 FIFA World Cup qualification	Pulgar	0	
786	14 June 2021	Estádio Olímpico Nilton Santos, Rio de Janeiro (N)	Argentina	1–1	2021 Copa América	Vargas	0	
787	18 June 2021	Arena Pantanal, Cuiabá (N)	Bolivia	1–0	2021 Copa América	Brereton	0	
788	21 June 2021	Arena Pantanal, Cuiabá (N)	Uruguay	1–1	2021 Copa América	Vargas	0	
789	24 June 2021	Estádio Nacional Mané Garrincha, Brasília (N)	Paraguay	0–2	2021 Copa América		0	
790	2 July 2021	Estádio Olímpico Nilton Santos, Rio de Janeiro (N)	Brazil	0–1	2021 Copa América		0	
791	2 September 2021	Estadio Nacional, Santiago (H)	Brazil	0–1	2022 FIFA World Cup qualification		11,000	
792	5 September 2021	Estadio Olímpico Atahualpa, Quito (A)	Ecuador	0–0	2022 FIFA World Cup qualification		12,000	
793	9 September 2021	Estadio El Campín, Bogotá (A)	Colombia	1–3	2022 FIFA World Cup qualification	Meneses	23,500	
794	7 October 2021	Estadio Nacional, Lima (A)	Peru	0–2	2022 FIFA World Cup qualification		8,000	
795	10 October 2021	Estadio San Carlos de Apoquindo, Santiago (H)	Paraguay	2–0	2022 FIFA World Cup qualification	Brereton, Isla	10,800	
796	14 October 2021	Estadio San Carlos de Apoquindo, Santiago (H)	Venezuela	3–0	2022 FIFA World Cup qualification	Pulgar (2), Brereton	10,000	
797	11 November 2021	Estadio Defensores del Chaco, Asunción (A)	Paraguay	1–0	2022 FIFA World Cup qualification	Sánchez	42,354	
798	16 November 2021	Estadio San Carlos de Apoquindo, Santiago (H)	Ecuador	0–2	2022 FIFA World Cup qualification		12,000	
799	8 December 2021	Q2 Stadium, Austin (N)	Mexico	2–2	Friendly	Morales, Parra	—	
800	12 December 2021	Banc of California Stadium, Los Angeles (N)	El Salvador	1–0	Friendly	Vegas	—	
801	27 January 2022	Estadio Zorros del Desierto, Calama (H)	Argentina	1–2	2022 FIFA World Cup qualification	Brereton	8,800	
802	1 February 2022	Estadio Hernando Siles, La Paz (A)	Bolivia	3–2	2022 FIFA World Cup qualification	Sánchez (2), Núñez	28,000	
803	24 March 2022	Maracanã Stadium, Rio de Janeiro (A)	Brazil	0–4	2022 FIFA World Cup qualification		69,368	
804	29 March 2022	Estadio San Carlos de Apoquindo, Santiago (H)	Uruguay	0–2	2022 FIFA World Cup qualification		11,000	
805	6 June 2022	Daejeon World Cup Stadium, Daejeon (A)	South Korea	0–2	Friendly		40,135	
806	10 June 2022	Noevir Stadium Kobe, Kobe (N)	Tunisia	0–2	2022 Kirin Cup Soccer		4,973	
807	14 June 2022	Panasonic Stadium Suita, Osaka (N)	Ghana	0–0 (1–3 p)	2022 Kirin Cup Soccer		6,185	
808	23 September 2023	Stage Front Stadium, Barcelona (N)	Morocco	0–2	Friendly		25,000	
809	27 September 2022	Franz Horr Stadium, Vienna (N)	Qatar	2–2	Friendly	Sanchez, Vidal	500	
810	16 November 2022	Stadion Wojska Polskiego, Warsaw (A)	Poland	0–1	Friendly		27,900	
811	20 November 2022	Tehelné pole, Bratislava (A)	Slovakia	0–0	Friendly		19,757	
812	28 March 2023	Estadio Monumental, Santiago (H)	Paraguay	3–2	Friendly	Díaz, Sánchez, Silva	30,000	
813	11 June 2023	Estadio Ester Roa, Concepción (H)	Cuba	3–0	Friendly	Nuñez (2), Echeverría	27,000	
814	16 June 2023	Estadio Sausalito, Viña del Mar (H)	Dominican Republic	5–0	Friendly	Brerton (3), Barticciotto (2)	18,000	
815	20 June 2023	Estadio Ramón Tahuichi Aguilera, Santa Cruz de la Sierra (A)	Bolivia	0–0	Friendly		—	
816	8 September 2023	Estadio Centenario, Montevideo (A)	Uruguay	1–3	2026 FIFA World Cup qualification	Vidal	49,713	
817	12 September 2023	Estadio Monumental, Santiago (H)	Colombia	0–0	2026 FIFA World Cup qualification		37,081	
818	12 October 2023	Estadio Monumental, Santiago (H)	Peru	2–0	2026 FIFA World Cup qualification	Valdés, Núñez	36,847	
819	17 October 2023	Estadio Monumental, Maturín (A)	Venezuela	0–3	2026 FIFA World Cup qualification		48,076	
820	16 November 2023	Estadio Monumental, Santiago (H)	Paraguay	0–0	2026 FIFA World Cup qualification		30,076	
821	21 November 2023	Estadio Rodrigo Paz Delgado, Quito (A)	Ecuador	0–1	2026 FIFA World Cup qualification		36,873	
822	22 March 2024	Stadio Ennio Tardini, Parma (N)	Albania	3–0	Friendly	Vargas, Bolados, Dávila	—	
823	26 March 2024	Stade Vélodrome, Marseille (A)	France	2–3	Friendly	Núñez, Osorio	—	
824	11 June 2024	Estadio Nacional, Santiago (H)	Paraguay	3–0	Friendly	Dávila (2), Vargas	—	
825	21 June 2024	AT&T Stadium, Arlington (N)	Peru	0–0	2024 Copa América		43,030	
826	25 June 2024	MetLife Stadium, East Rutherford (N)	Argentina	0–1	2024 Copa América		81,106	
827	29 June 2024	Exploria Stadium, Orlando (N)	Canada	0–0	2024 Copa América		24,481	
828	5 September 2024	Estadio Monumental, Buenos Aires (A)	Argentina	0–3	2026 FIFA World Cup qualification		52,160	
829	10 September 2024	Estadio Nacional, Santiago (H)	Bolivia	1–2	2026 FIFA World Cup qualification	Vargas	—	
830	10 October 2024	Estadio Nacional, Santiago (H)	Brazil	1–2	2026 FIFA World Cup qualification	Vargas	—	
831	15 October 2024	Estadio Metropolitano, Barranquilla (A)	Colombia	0–4	2026 FIFA World Cup qualification		—	
832	15 November 2024	Estadio Nacional, Lima (A)	Peru	0–0	2026 FIFA World Cup qualification		—	
833	19 November 2024	Estadio Nacional, Santiago (H)	Venezuela	4–2	2026 FIFA World Cup qualification	Vargas, Rincón (o.g.), Cepeda (2)	—	
834	8 February 2025	Estadio Nacional, Santiago (H)	Panama	6–1	Friendly	Guerra (3), Uribe, Cepeda, Pino	—	
835	20 March 2025	Estadio Defensores del Chaco, Asunción (A)	Paraguay	0–1	2026 FIFA World Cup qualification		—	
836	25 March 2025	Estadio Nacional, Santiago (H)	Ecuador	0–0	2026 FIFA World Cup qualification		—	
837	5 June 2025	Estadio Nacional, Santiago (H)	Argentina	0–1	2026 FIFA World Cup qualification		38,996	
838	10 June 2025	Estadio Municipal de El Alto, El Alto (A)	Bolivia	0–2	2026 FIFA World Cup qualification		—	
839	4 September 2025	Maracanã Stadium, Rio de Janeiro (A)	Brazil	0–3	2026 FIFA World Cup qualification		57,326	
840	9 September 2025	Estadio Nacional, Santiago (H)	Uruguay	0–0	2026 FIFA World Cup qualification		—	
841	10 October 2025	Estadio Bicentenario de La Florida, Santiago (H)	Peru	2–1	Friendly	B. Díaz, Gutiérrez	—	
842	15 November 2025	Fisht Olympic Stadium, Sochi (A)	Russia	2–0	Friendly	Tapia, B. Díaz	32,779	
843	18 November 2025	Fisht Olympic Stadium, Sochi (N)	Peru	2–1	Friendly	Loyola, Osorio	—	
844	27 March 2026	Eden Park, Auckland (N)	Cape Verde	4–2	2026 FIFA Series	Díaz, Gutiérrez, Loyola, Tapia	—	
845	30 March 2026	Eden Park, Auckland (A)	New Zealand	1–4	2026 FIFA Series	Tapia	14,327	
846	6 June 2026	Estádio Nacional, Lisbon (A)	Portugal	1–2	Friendly	Cepeda	—	
847	9 June 2026	Stade de la Source, Orléans (N)	DR Congo	2–1	Friendly	Sepúlveda, Cepeda	—	
848	26 September 2026	BMO Field, Toronto (A)	Canada	0–1	Friendly		23,310	
849	29 September 2026	Energizer Park, St. Louis (A)	United States	2–4	Friendly	Ulloa, Gutiérrez	21,680	
850	6 October 2026	Los Angeles Memorial Coliseum, Los Angeles (N)	Mexico	2–0	Friendly	Gutiérrez, Pizarro	56,529	
851	13 November 2026	Estadio Olímpico Pascual Guerrero, Cali (A)	Colombia		Friendly			
852	17 November 2026	Estadio Nacional Julio Martínez Prádanos, Santiago (H)	Colombia		Friendly			

Notes

1. A: Match held behind closed doors due to the COVID-19 pandemic in South America.
2. B: Matches due to be held in March 2021 were postponed due to travel and quarantine restrictions caused by the COVID-19 pandemic. These matches were instead played in September and October 2021.

== Record by opponent ==
Team	Pld	W	D	L	GF	GA	GD	WPCT
Albania	1	1	0	0	3	0	+3	100.00
Argentina	6	0	2	4	3	9	−6	0.00
Bolivia	7	3	2	2	8	8	0	42.86
Brazil	5	0	0	5	1	11	−10	0.00
Canada	2	1	1	0	1	0	+1	50.00
Cape Verde	1	1	0	0	4	2	+2	100.00
Colombia	4	0	2	2	3	9	−6	0.00
Cuba	1	1	0	0	3	0	+3	100.00
Dominican Republic	1	1	0	0	5	0	+5	100.00
DR Congo	1	1	0	0	2	1	+1	100.00
Ecuador	4	0	2	2	0	3	−3	0.00
El Salvador	1	1	0	0	1	0	+1	100.00
France	1	0	0	1	2	3	−1	0.00
Ghana	1	0	1	0	0	0	0	0.00
Mexico	4	1	1	2	4	4	0	25.00
Morocco	1	0	0	1	0	2	−2	0.00
New Zealand	1	0	0	1	1	4	−3	0.00
Panama	1	1	0	0	6	1	+5	100.00
Paraguay	7	4	1	2	9	5	+4	57.14
Peru	7	4	2	1	8	4	+4	57.14
Poland	1	0	0	1	0	1	−1	0.00
Portugal	1	0	0	1	1	2	−1	0.00
Qatar	1	0	1	0	2	2	0	0.00
Russia	1	1	0	0	2	0	+2	100.00
Slovakia	1	0	1	0	0	0	0	0.00
South Korea	1	0	0	1	0	2	−2	0.00
Tunisia	1	0	0	1	0	2	−2	0.00
Uruguay	5	0	2	3	3	8	−5	0.00
United States	7	4	0	3	6	6	0	57.14
Venezuela	4	2	0	2	8	7	+1	50.00
Total	80	27	18	35	86	96	−10	33.75

Source: Results
