= Pedro González (footballer, born 1967) =

Chilean footballer and manager

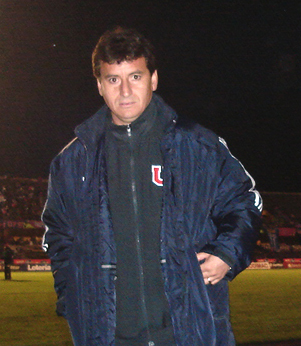
- González with Universidad de Chile in 2006

Personal information
- Full name: Pedro Alejandro González Vera
- Date of birth: October 17, 1967 (age 59)
- Place of birth: Valdivia, Chile
- Height: 1.78 m (5 ft 10 in)
- Position: Forward

Youth career
- Deportivo San Luis
- Deportes Valdivia

Senior career*
Years	Team	Apps	(Gls)
1985–1989	Deportes Valdivia	57	(5)
1990	Unión Española	12	(2)
1991–1992	Coquimbo Unido	51	(21)
1993–1997	Cobreloa	120	(42)
1997–2002	Universidad de Chile	175	(112)
2003–2004	Unión Española	79	(24)
2005	Coquimbo Unido	28	(5)
2006	Santiago Morning	16	(2)
2006	Universidad de Chile	7	(0)
Total		545	(213)

International career
1987	Chile U20		
1993–2000	Chile	29	(5)

Managerial career
- 2012–2018: Unión Española (youth)
- 2018–2019: Deportes Valdivia (youth)
- 2019: Deportes Valdivia
- * Club domestic league appearances and goals

Pedro Alejandro González Vera (born 17 October 1967 in Valdivia) is a Chilean football manager and former football player nicknamed "Heidi". A forward, with 212 goals, he is the second highest scorer in the history of Chilean football after Francisco "Chamaco" Valdés, who has 215 official goals.

== Club career ==
Born in Valdivia, Chile, González was trained at local clubs Deportivo San Luis and Deportes Valdivia.

== International career ==
González represented Chile at under-20 level in both the 1987 South American Championship and the 1987 FIFA World Youth Championship. At senior level, he earned 29 caps and scored 5 goals from 1993 to 2000.

== Managerial career ==
After working for seven years in the Unión Española youth system, in August 2018 González became the General Manager of the Deportes Valdivia youth system and the coach of the under-19 level team. In 2019, he coached the first team for three months, returning to the youth system in August of the same year.

== Outside of football ==
Settled in Valdivia, Chile, González made a beer and started a brewery called "Heidi" in 2025.

== Honours ==
=== Player ===
Deportes Valdivia

- Segunda División de Chile (1): 1987

Universidad de Chile

- Primera División de Chile (2): 1999, 2000
- Copa Chile (2): 1998, 2000

Individual

- Primera División de Chile Top-scorer (2): 1998, 2000
