= Braulio Musso =

Chilean footballer (1930–2025)

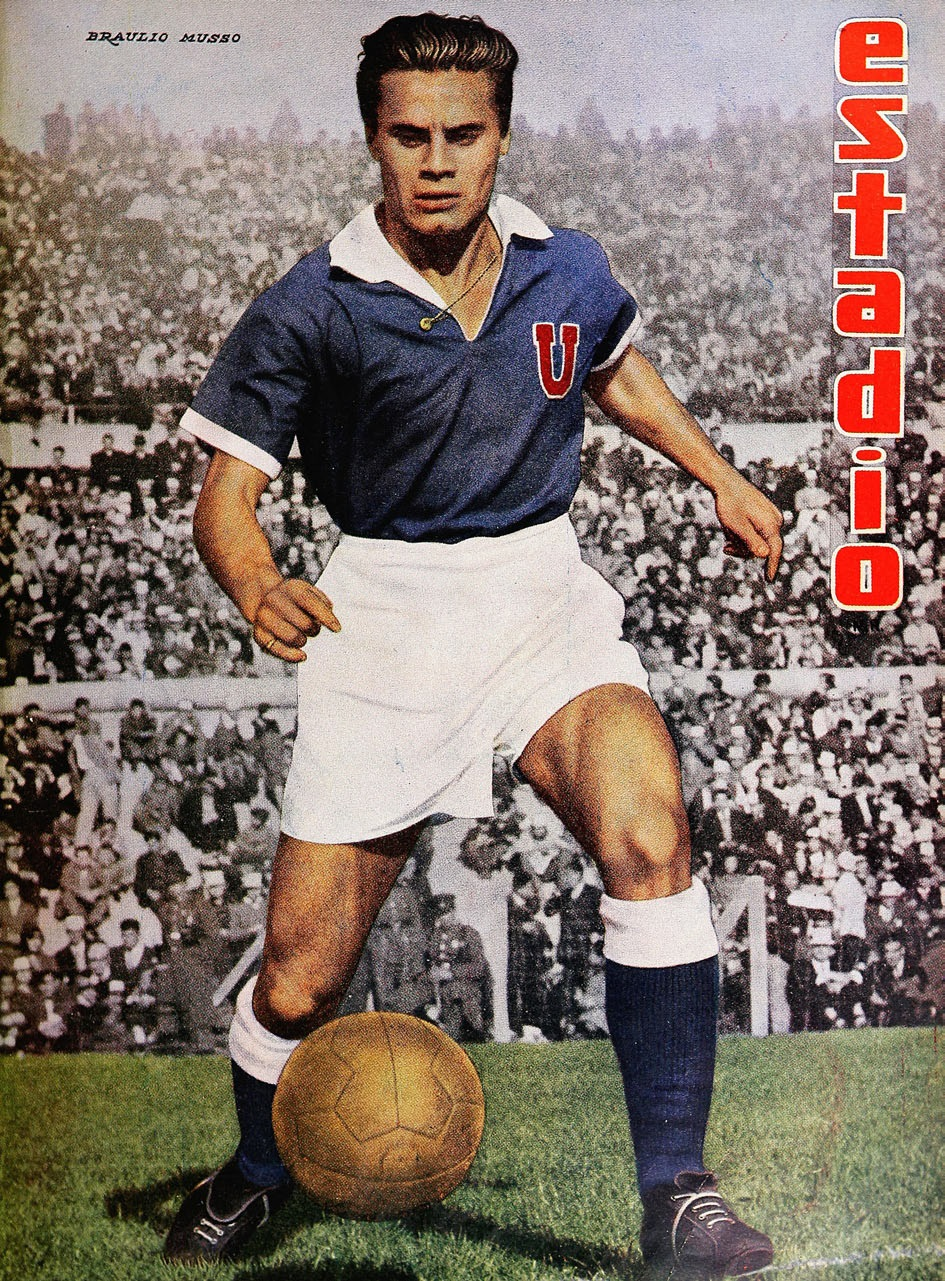
- Musso in 1954

Personal information
- Full name: Braulio Enrique Musso Reyes
- Date of birth: 8 March 1930
- Place of birth: Limache, Chile
- Date of death: 18 June 2025 (aged 95)
- Height: 1.70 m (5 ft 7 in)
- Position: Left winger

Senior career*
Years	Team	Apps	(Gls)
1951–1968	Universidad de Chile	382	(82)

International career
1954–1961	Chile	14	(3)
Medal record
Men's football
Representing Chile
FIFA World Cup
Third place	1962 Chile
- * Club domestic league appearances and goals

Braulio Enrique Musso Reyes (8 March 1930 – 18 June 2025) was a Chilean footballer who played as a left winger for Universidad de Chile from 1951 to 1968. He was a member of the Chile national team at the 1962 FIFA World Cup without playing in any games.

Musso died on 18 June 2025, at the age of 95.

== Honours ==
Universidad de Chile

- Chilean Primera División: 1959, 1962, 1964, 1965, 1967
