= Gabriel Galleguillos =

Chilean footballer (born 1944)

Personal information
- Full name: Gabriel Galleguillos González
- Date of birth: November 19, 1944 (age 81)
- Place of birth: Melipilla, Chile
- Height: 1.73 m (5 ft 8 in)
- Position: Right winger

Senior career*
| Years | Team | Apps | (Gls) |
| 1965 | Coquimbo Unido | 5 | (0) |
| 1966–1968 | Ferrobádminton | | |
| 1969–1971 | Lota Schwager | 83 | (14) |
| 1972–1973 | Deportes Concepción | 41 | (13) |
| 1973–1977 | Salamanca | 69 | (9) |
| 1977–1978 | Castellón | 21 | (1) |

International career
| 1973 | Chile | 1 | (0) |
- * Club domestic league appearances and goals

Gabriel Galleguillos González (born 19 November 1944) is a Chilean former footballer who played as a right winger for clubs in Chile and Spain.

== Club career ==
In his homeland, Galleguillos made five appearances for Coquimbo Unido in the top division in 1965. Next, he played for Ferrobádminton, making sixteen appearances in the top division in 1966, before joining Lota Schwager from 1969 to 1971. As a member of Lota Schwager, he won the 1969 Segunda División de Chile and got promotion to the top division by first time in the club history.

After a successful stint with Deportes Concepción, he signed with UD Salamanca in the Spanish Segunda División in 1973. After four seasons with Salamanca, he played for CD Castellón in the 1977–78 season.

== International career ==
Galleguillos made one appearance for the Chile national team in a friendly match against Haiti on 14 April 1973.

In addition, he played and scored a goal in a 3–2 win against Argentine club Racing Club on 11 February 1973.

== Personal life ==
Galleguillos naturalized Spanish in 1974.

He is the founder of "Papas Chip", a fast food restaurant located in La Serena, Chile, specialized in an original preparation of fries.

== Honours ==
Lota Schwager

- Segunda División de Chile: 1969
