= Eduardo Vargas =

Chilean footballer (born 1989)

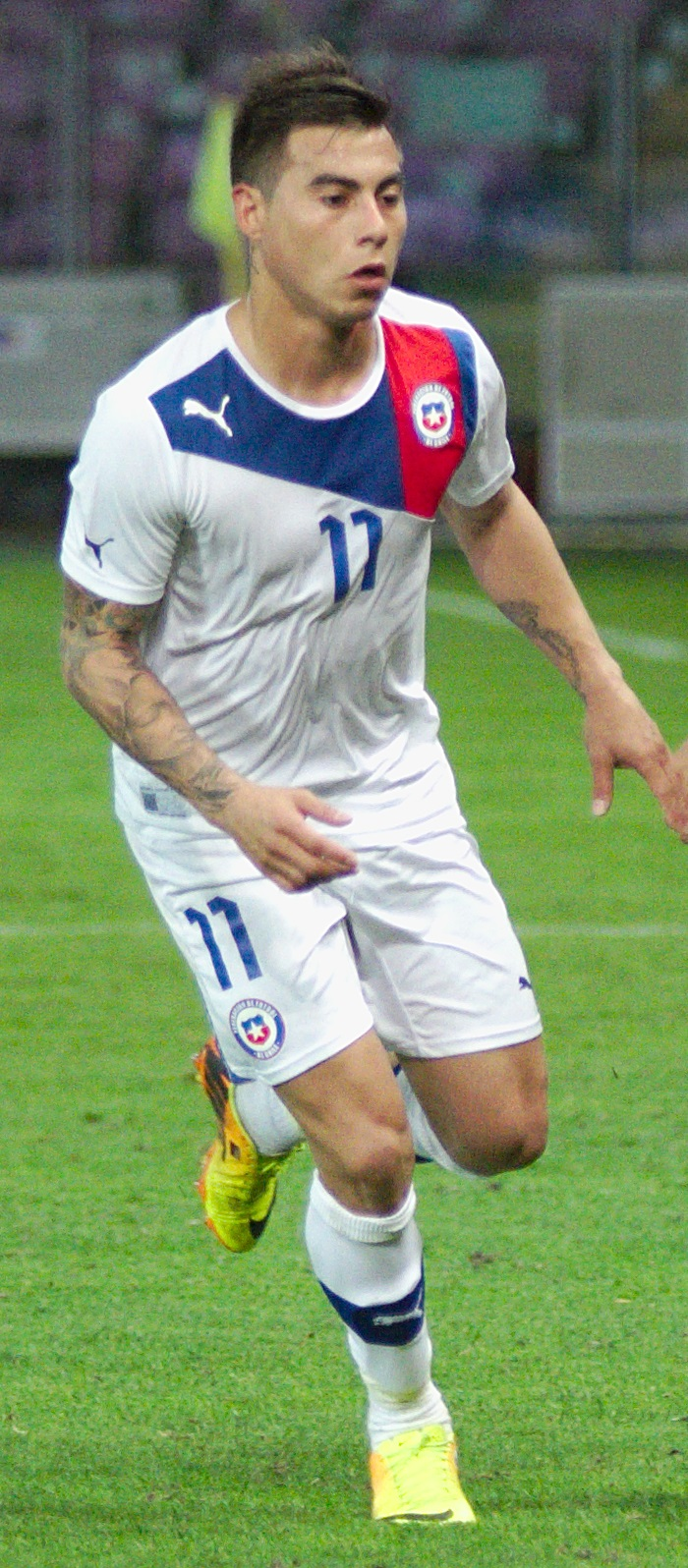
- Vargas playing for Chile in 2013

Personal information
- Full name: Eduardo Jesús Vargas Rojas
- Date of birth: 20 November 1989 (age 36)
- Place of birth: Santiago, Chile
- Height: 1.73 m (5 ft 8 in)
- Positions: Forward; winger

Team information
- Current team: Universidad de Chile
- Number: 11

Youth career
- 1999–2002: Internacional de Renca
- 2003–2004: Deportes Puerto Montt
- 2005–2006: Cobreloa

Senior career*
| Years | Team | Apps | (Gls) |
| 2006 | Cobreloa B | 12 | (2) |
| 2006–2009 | Cobreloa | 54 | (10) |
| 2010–2011 | Universidad de Chile | 55 | (18) |
| 2012–2015 | Napoli | 19 | (0) |
| 2013 | → Grêmio (loan) | 18 | (6) |
| 2014 | → Valencia (loan) | 17 | (3) |
| 2014–2015 | → Queens Park Rangers (loan) | 21 | (3) |
| 2015–2017 | TSG Hoffenheim | 29 | (2) |
| 2017–2020 | Tigres UANL | 120 | (29) |
| 2020–2024 | Atlético Mineiro | 117 | (26) |
| 2025 | Nacional | 12 | (2) |
| 2025 | Audax Italiano | 13 | (4) |
| 2026– | Universidad de Chile | 25 | (13) |

International career^{‡}
| 2009 | Chile U23 | 6 | (4) |
| 2009– | Chile | 120 | (45) |
Medal record
Men's football
Representing Chile
Copa América
| Winner | 2015 |
| Winner | 2016 |
FIFA Confederations Cup
| Runner-up | 2017 |
China Cup
| Winner | 2017 |
- * Club domestic league appearances and goals as of 8 November 2026 ‡ National team caps and goals as of 25 March 2025

Eduardo Jesús Vargas Rojas (Spanish pronunciation: [eˈðwaɾðo ˈβaɾɣas]; (Note: In isolation, Vargas was pronounced [ˈbaɾɣas].) born 20 November 1989) is a Chilean professional footballer who plays as a forward for Liga de Primera club Universidad de Chile.

Emerging as a top talent at Cobreloa, Vargas moved to Universidad de Chile where he won three titles, including the 2011 Copa Sudamericana, where he was named player of the tournament. In 2011, he was co-awarded the Chilean Footballer of the Year and also finished as runner-up for the South American Footballer of the Year. Following an £11.5 million move to Napoli, Vargas had subsequent loan spells at Grêmio, Valencia and Queens Park Rangers before moving to TSG Hoffenheim in 2015.

A full international since 2010, Vargas has earned 120 caps for Chile, scoring over 40 goals. He was part of their squad at the 2014 FIFA World Cup, the 2017 FIFA Confederations Cup, and the Copa América in 2015, 2016, 2019, 2021 and 2024. He would finish as top scorer in Chile's title-winning 2015 and 2016 Copa América campaigns.

== Club career ==
=== Early career ===
Born in Santiago, Vargas grew up in Renca, and began his career playing for Internacional de Renca's youth setup. He also had trials at Universidad Católica and Palestino before taking part of Deportes Puerto Montt's youth categories. In 2005, he was invited to a reality show headed by Adidas, called Adidas Selection Team, and despite not winning the competition, he impressed enough to start the 2006 pre-season trialling with Puerto Rico Islanders, as the club was in Chile.

=== Cobreloa ===
In 2006, Vargas was signed by Cobreloa after impressing in a ten-day trial. Initially assigned to the B-team in the Tercera División, he scored twice during his stay, netting against Universidad Arturo Prat and San Marcos de Arica in August.

Vargas made his first team debut on 23 July 2006, aged just 16, playing the last 20 minutes in a 4–1 away loss against Puerto Montt. He appeared in three more matches during the season, all from the bench. After only five further appearances in 2007, he became a regular starter in 2008, scoring his first professional goal on 16 March in a 3–2 home defeat of Palestino. On 30 August, he scored a brace in a 4–3 away win against the same opponent.

Vargas established himself as a starter in 2009, contributing with four goals in 23 appearances.

=== Universidad de Chile ===
On 7 January 2010, Vargas joined Universidad de Chile for a US$700,000 transfer fee. He made his debut for the club on 25 January, replacing Gabriel Vargas and scoring the last in a 5–1 home routing of Cobresal.

Vargas only broke into the first team during the 2011 campaign, and had a brilliant performance during the year, scoring 29 goals and providing in 51 matches. He also won both league semestral tournaments (Torneo Apertura and Torneo Clausura), as well as the Copa Sudamericana, where he was the edition's top-scorer and netted goals in both final legs against LDU Quito, scoring the only goal at Casa Blanca and twice in the 3–0 win at the Estadio Nacional in Santiago.

Vargas was chosen as a candidate for South American Footballer of the Year in November 2011, eventually placing as runner-up to Neymar. Then in December, Vargas was con-decorated as the Chilean Footballer of the Year.

=== Napoli ===
In December 2011, Italian club Napoli purchased the player for a reported US$17.9 million (£11.5 million). On 23 December 2011, Napoli club president Aurelio De Laurentiis, announced Vargas would arrive at the club: "I would like to inform you officially that we purchased Vargas, a few minutes ago I received a call from Dr. De Nicola, who visited the footballer and gave his okay under medical and athletic profile. We signed the contract and we also won the competition by strong Club who wanted the player. This is the testimony that our observatory is always open and we are continuously looking for young talents in the world that can make the case of Napoli and for the growth of our team." Vargas arrived at Napoli on 6 January 2012 and signed on 9 January. He made his debut in a 2–1 Coppa Italia defeat of Cesena at the Stadio San Paolo on 12 January. On 20 May, he was an unused substitute as Napoli defeated Juventus in the Coppa Italia Final at the Stadio Olimpico.

On 20 September 2012, in the first match of Napoli's UEFA Europa League campaign, Vargas scored his first Napoli goals, netting three in a 4–0 victory against AIK. This was the first time that a Chilean player had scored a hat-trick in a continental competition in Europe.

==== Grêmio (loan) ====
On 17 January 2013, Vargas agreed to go on loan to Brazilian side Grêmio. He made his first appearance six days later in a Copa Libertadores match against LDU Quito. He scored his first goal on 21 February against Fluminense in the Copa Libertadores. On 31 March, he scored his first goal in the Campeonato Gaúcho, converting a penalty at the Arena do Grêmio in a 1–1 draw with Passo Fundo.

==== Valencia (loan) ====
On 23 January 2014, Vargas joined La Liga club Valencia on loan for the rest of the 2013–14 season. Vargas played his first official match for Los Che in a 3–2 away win at Camp Nou against champions Barcelona on 1 February 2014. He scored his first La Liga goal against Real Betis, in a 5–0 home win.

Vargas recorded two goals and three assists in eight appearances as Valencia reached the semi-finals of the 2013–14 UEFA Europa League.

==== Queens Park Rangers (loan) ====
On 21 August 2014, Vargas joined Queens Park Rangers on loan until the end of the 2014–15 Premier League season. He made his debut for the club on 14 September against Manchester United, replacing Charlie Austin for the last 31 minutes at Old Trafford. On 19 October, in a 2–3 loss against Liverpool at Loftus Road, Vargas scored twice after coming on as a substitute for Bobby Zamora in the 78th minute. On 26 December, in a 2–1 loss to Arsenal, Vargas helped his goalkeeper Robert Green save an early penalty from Alexis Sánchez by pointing out which way his fellow Chilean was likely to shoot the ball.

On 22 March 2015, Vargas scored his first goal in five months in QPR's 1–2 home defeat to Everton. He also scored in the team's 4–1 victory at West Bromwich Albion on 4 April, but injured his knee ligament in that match, ruling him out for the remainder of the season. The season ended with QPR finishing bottom of the league, resulting in their relegation to the Championship.

=== Hoffenheim ===
On 24 August 2015, Vargas joined German Bundesliga club 1899 Hoffenheim on a four-year deal, for a reported fee of €5 million, plus an additional percentage of any sell-on fee.

=== Tigres UANL ===
On 27 January 2017, Liga MX club Tigres UANL announced Vargas would be joining the club. On 16 July 2017, he scored in the 1–0 victory over Guadalajara in the 2017 Campeón de Campeones.

Vargas played the final against Tigres' archrival: CF Monterrey. In the first leg the teams drew 1–1 at the Estadio Universitario. In the Estadio BBVA Bancomer, Tigres beat Monterrey 2–1. Vargas and Francisco Meza scored.

=== Atlético Mineiro ===
On 9 November 2020, Vargas joined Atlético Mineiro on a two-year contract.

=== Nacional ===
In January 2025, Vargas moved to Uruguay and signed with Nacional. He ended his contract on 24 July 2025. After taking part in both the Torneo Apertura and Torneo Intermedio, he won the 2025 Liga AUF Uruguaya.

=== Audax Italiano ===
The same day Nacional announced his release, Vargas signed with Audax Italiano until the end of the year.

=== Return to Universidad de Chile ===
On 3 January 2026, Vargas returned to Universidad de Chile after fourteen years.

== International career ==
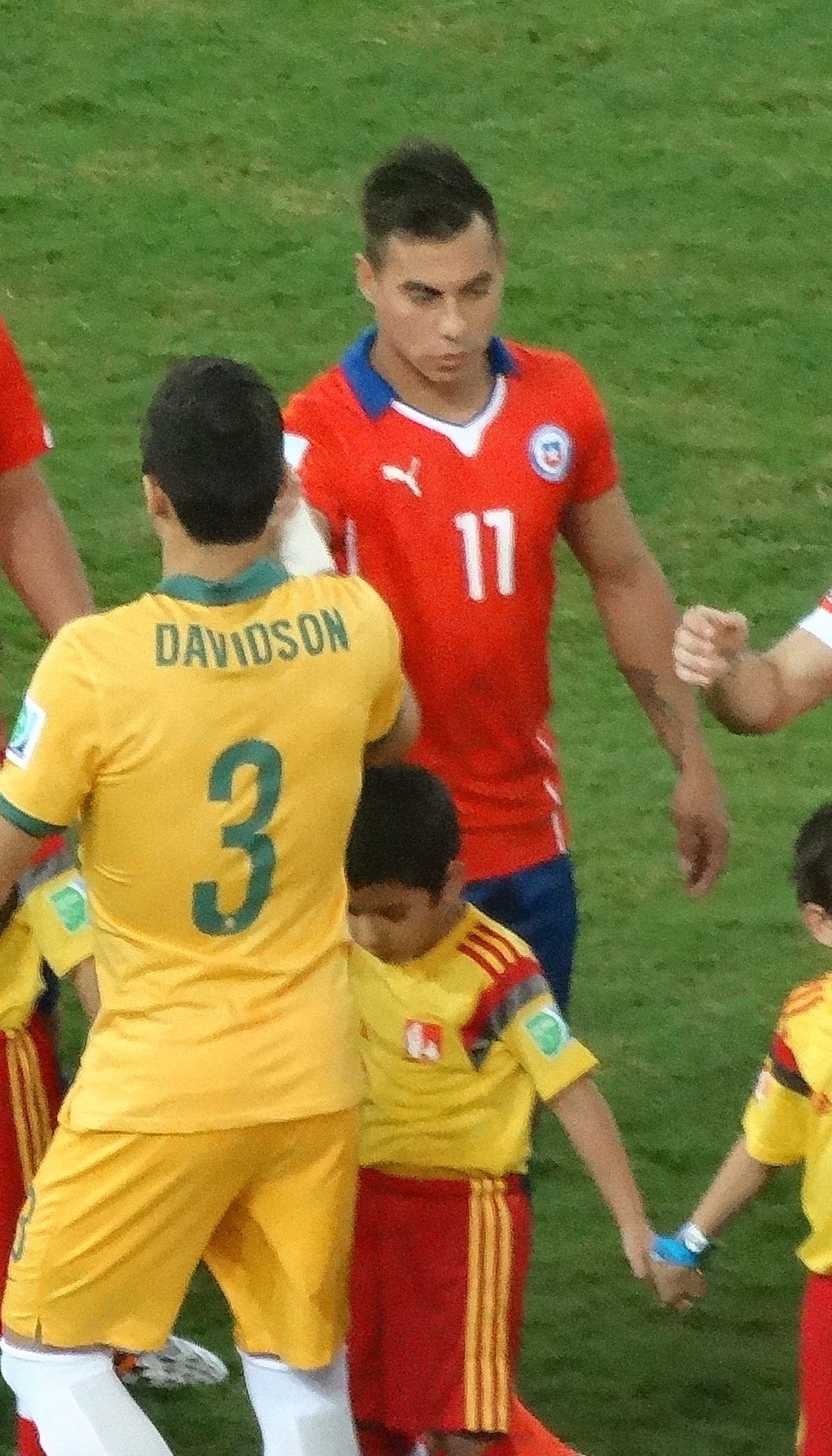
Vargas shaking hands with the Australian team before their group match at the 2014 FIFA World Cup

In 2009, Vargas participated in the Toulon Tournament with the Chile under-23 national team, where he was champion and the team's second top goalscorer. On 5 November 2009, he made his full international debut for the senior team in a 2–1 win over Paraguay at the Estadio CAP.

In 2011, Vargas was recalled and scored his first goal in a 3–2 friendly defeat to Spain on 2 September. On 12 October, he scored his first competitive international goal in a 4–2 2014 FIFA World Cup qualifying win over Peru at the Estadio Monumental.

In September 2013, Vargas broke the Chile national team record for goals in consecutive matches – previously held jointly by Marcelo Salas and Carlos Caszely – by scoring twice in a 2–2 friendly draw with Spain. During 2013, he scored in six consecutive matches and nine times overall for La Roja.

=== 2014 World Cup ===
On 1 June 2014, Vargas was named by Jorge Sampaoli in Chile's 23-man squad for the 2014 World Cup in Brazil. In Chile's second group match, against defending champions Spain at the Maracanã Stadium, Vargas scored the team's opening goal as they mathematically eliminated Spain and secured qualification to the knockout stage.

=== 2015 Copa América ===
On 11 June 2015, Vargas scored for Chile in the opening match of the 2015 Copa América, a 2–0 win over Ecuador at the Estadio Nacional in Santiago. In the team's next fixture, Vargas scored his second goal of the tournament, heading an equalizer as the hosts drew 3–3 with Mexico on 15 June. In the semi-final against Peru, Vargas scored both goals in a 2–1 victory for Chile, the second of which was a long-distance effort, to send La Roja to the final. Although Vargas was substituted out in extra time, Chile won in a penalty shootout against Argentina to win their first major international honour. Vargas' four goals made him the competition's joint top scorer alongside Peruvian Paolo Guerrero, and he was named in the Team of the Tournament.

=== Copa América Centenario ===
On 14 June 2016, at the Copa América Centenario, Vargas and Alexis Sánchez scored twice each in a 4–2 win over Panama in Philadelphia to qualify for the quarter-finals of the tournament. Four days later, he added four more goals at Levi's Stadium in a 7–0 rout of Mexico. Chile retained their title with another win on penalties against Argentina, and Vargas was again the top scorer with six goals.

Despite his previous successes with the national team, Vargas, along with Marcelo Díaz, fell out of favour following the appointment of Reinaldo Rueda in 2018 and made only a single friendly appearance for Chile in the year.

=== 2019 Copa América ===
Vargas was included in Chile's 23-man squad for the 2019 Copa América in Brazil. He scored twice against Japan in a 4–0 win for Chile's opening match.

=== 2021 Copa América ===
Vargas scored two goals in the 2021 Copa América, one each against Argentina and Uruguay, which both ended in a 1–1 draw. On 2 July 2021, Vargas played his 100th match for Chile in a 1–0 defeat against Brazil in the quarter-finals.

== Career statistics ==
=== Club ===
As of match played 8 November 2026

Appearances and goals by club, season and competition
| Club | Season | League | | | State league (Note: Includes Campeonato Gaúcho, Campeonato Mineiro) | | National cup (Note: Includes Copa Chile, Coppa Italia, Copa do Brasil, FA Cup, DFB-Pokal, Copa MX) | | Continental | | Other | | Total | |
| Club | Season | Division | Apps | Goals | Apps | Goals | Apps | Goals | Apps | Goals | Apps | Goals | Apps | Goals |
|---|---|---|---|---|---|---|---|---|---|---|---|---|---|---|
| Cobreloa B | 2006 | Chilean Tercera División | 12 | 2 | — | | — | | — | | — | | 12 | 2 |
| Cobreloa | 2006 | Chilean Primera División | 4 | 0 | — | | — | | — | | — | | 4 | 0 |
| Cobreloa | 2007 | Chilean Primera División | 5 | 0 | — | | — | | — | | — | | 5 | 0 |
| Cobreloa | 2008 | Chilean Primera División | 21 | 4 | — | | 2 | 0 | — | | — | | 23 | 4 |
| Cobreloa | 2009 | Chilean Primera División | 24 | 6 | — | | 1 | 1 | — | | — | | 25 | 7 |
| Cobreloa | Total | | 54 | 10 | — | | 3 | 1 | — | | — | | 57 | 11 |
| Universidad de Chile | 2010 | Chilean Primera División | 18 | 1 | — | | — | | 10 (Note: Nine appearances and two goals in Copa Libertadores, one appearance in Copa Sudamericana) | 2 | — | | 28 | 3 |
| Universidad de Chile | 2011 | Chilean Primera División | 37 | 17 | — | | 2 | 1 | 12 (Note: Appearances in Copa Sudamericana) | 11 | — | | 51 | 29 |
| Universidad de Chile | Total | | 55 | 18 | — | | 2 | 1 | 22 | 13 | — | | 79 | 32 |
| Napoli | 2011–12 | Serie A | 10 | 0 | — | | 2 | 0 | 1 (Note: Appearance in UEFA Champions League) | 0 | — | | 13 | 0 |
| Napoli | 2012–13 | Serie A | 9 | 0 | — | | 0 | 0 | 6 (Note: Appearances in UEFA Europa League) | 3 | 0 | 0 | 15 | 3 |
| Napoli | Total | | 19 | 0 | — | | 2 | 0 | 7 | 3 | 0 | 0 | 28 | 3 |
| Grêmio (loan) | 2013 | Série A | 18 | 6 | 6 | 1 | 3 | 0 | 10 (Note: Appearance in Copa Libertadores) | 2 | — | | 37 | 9 |
| Valencia (loan) | 2013–14 | La Liga | 17 | 3 | — | | — | | 8 | 2 | — | | 25 | 5 |
| Queens Park Rangers (loan) | 2014–15 | Premier League | 21 | 3 | — | | 1 | 0 | — | | — | | 22 | 3 |
| TSG Hoffenheim | 2015–16 | Bundesliga | 24 | 2 | — | | 0 | 0 | — | | — | | 24 | 2 |
| TSG Hoffenheim | 2016–17 | Bundesliga | 5 | 0 | — | | 1 | 0 | — | | — | | 6 | 0 |
| TSG Hoffenheim | Total | | 29 | 2 | — | | 1 | 0 | — | | — | | 30 | 2 |
| Tigres UANL | 2016–17 | Liga MX | 12 | 1 | — | | 6 (Note: Appearances in CONCACAF Champions League) | 2 | — | | — | | 18 | 4 |
| Tigres UANL | 2017–18 | Liga MX | 41 | 10 | — | | 1 | 0 | 4 | 2 | 1 (Note: Appearance in Campeón de Campeones) | 1 | 47 | 13 |
| Tigres UANL | 2018–19 | Liga MX | 34 | 11 | — | | 5 | 4 | 8 | 2 | 2 (Note: One appearance in Campeón de Campeones, one appearance in Campeones Cup) | 0 | 49 | 17 |
| Tigres UANL | 2019–20 | Liga MX | 19 | 4 | — | | 0 | 0 | 2 | 1 | 4 (Note: One appearance in Campeón de Campeones, three appearances and one goal in Leagues Cup) | 1 | 25 | 6 |
| Tigres UANL | 2020–21 | Liga MX | 14 | 3 | — | | 0 | 0 | 0 | 0 | 0 | 0 | 14 | 3 |
| Tigres UANL | Total | | 120 | 29 | — | | 6 | 4 | 20 | 7 | 7 | 2 | 153 | 42 |
| Atlético Mineiro | 2020 | Série A | 16 | 2 | — | | — | | — | | — | | 16 | 2 |
| Atlético Mineiro | 2021 | Série A | 16 | 4 | 9 | 3 | 7 | 3 | 11 | 3 | — | | 43 | 13 |
| Atlético Mineiro | 2022 | Série A | 24 | 5 | 4 | 1 | 3 | 0 | 7 | 0 | 1 (Note: Appearance in Supercopa do Brasil) | 0 | 39 | 6 |
| Atlético Mineiro | 2023 | Série A | 12 | 1 | 9 | 2 | 3 | 0 | 7 | 0 | — | | 31 | 3 |
| Atlético Mineiro | 2024 | Série A | 23 | 8 | 4 | 0 | 5 | 0 | 6 | 1 | — | | 38 | 9 |
| Atlético Mineiro | Total | | 91 | 20 | 26 | 6 | 18 | 3 | 31 | 4 | 1 | 0 | 167 | 33 |
| Nacional | 2025 | Uruguayan Primera División | 12 | 2 | — | | — | | 4 | 0 | — | | 16 | 2 |
| Audax Italiano | 2025 | Chilean Primera División | 13 | 4 | — | | 2 | 1 | — | | — | | 15 | 5 |
| Universidad de Chile | 2026 | Chilean Primera División | 25 | 13 | — | | 4 | 2 | 1 | 0 | 5 (Note: Appearances in Copa de la Liga (Chile)) | 2 | 35 | 17 |
| Career total | | | 486 | 113 | 32 | 7 | 42 | 12 | 103 | 30 | 13 | 4 | 676 | 166 |

=== International ===
As of match played 25 March 2025

Appearances and goals by national team and year
| National team | Year | Apps | Goals |
|---|---|---|---|
| Chile | 2009 | 1 | 0 |
| Chile | 2010 | 2 | 0 |
| Chile | 2011 | 6 | 2 |
| Chile | 2012 | 6 | 0 |
| Chile | 2013 | 12 | 9 |
| Chile | 2014 | 12 | 7 |
| Chile | 2015 | 13 | 7 |
| Chile | 2016 | 14 | 7 |
| Chile | 2017 | 15 | 3 |
| Chile | 2018 | 1 | 0 |
| Chile | 2019 | 9 | 3 |
| Chile | 2020 | 2 | 0 |
| Chile | 2021 | 11 | 2 |
| Chile | 2022 | 2 | 0 |
| Chile | 2023 | 0 | 0 |
| Chile | 2024 | 12 | 5 |
| Chile | 2025 | 2 | 0 |
| Total | | 120 | 45 |

Score and result columns lists Chile's goal tally first.

List of international goals scored by Eduardo Vargas
| No. | Date | Venue | Opponent | Score | Result | Competition |
|---|---|---|---|---|---|---|
| 1. | 2 September 2011 | AFG Arena, St. Gallen, Switzerland | Spain | 2–0 | 2–3 | Friendly |
| 2. | 12 October 2011 | Estadio Monumental, Santiago, Chile | Peru | 2–0 | 4–2 | 2014 FIFA World Cup qualification |
| 3. | 6 February 2013 | Vicente Calderón, Madrid, Spain | Egypt | 1–0 | 2–1 | Friendly |
| 4. | 26 March 2013 | Estadio Nacional, Santiago, Chile | Uruguay | 2–0 | 2–0 | 2014 FIFA World Cup qualification |
| 5. | 24 April 2013 | Mineirão, Belo Horizonte, Brazil | Brazil | 2–2 | 2–2 | Friendly |
| 6. | 7 June 2013 | Estadio Defensores del Chaco, Asunción, Paraguay | Paraguay | 1–0 | 2–1 | 2014 FIFA World Cup qualification |
| 7. | 11 June 2013 | Estadio Nacional, Santiago, Chile | Bolivia | 1–0 | 3–1 | 2014 FIFA World Cup qualification |
| 8. | 6 September 2013 | Estadio Nacional, Santiago, Chile | Venezuela | 1–0 | 3–0 | 2014 FIFA World Cup qualification |
| 9. | 10 September 2013 | Stade de Genève, Geneva, Switzerland | Spain | 1–0 | 2–2 | Friendly |
| 10. | 10 September 2013 | Stade de Genève, Geneva, Switzerland | Spain | 2–1 | 2–2 | Friendly |
| 11. | 19 November 2013 | Rogers Centre, Toronto, Canada | Brazil | 1–1 | 1–2 | Friendly |
| 12. | 30 May 2014 | Estadio Nacional, Santiago, Chile | Egypt | 2–2 | 3–2 | Friendly |
| 13. | 30 May 2014 | Estadio Nacional, Santiago, Chile | Egypt | 3–2 | 3–2 | Friendly |
| 14. | 4 June 2014 | Estadio Elías Figueroa, Valparaíso, Chile | Northern Ireland | 1–0 | 2–0 | Friendly |
| 15. | 18 June 2014 | Maracanã Stadium, Rio de Janeiro, Brazil | Spain | 1–0 | 2–0 | 2014 FIFA World Cup |
| 16. | 10 October 2014 | Estadio Elías Figueroa, Valparaíso, Chile | Peru | 1–0 | 3–0 | Friendly |
| 17. | 10 October 2014 | Estadio Elías Figueroa, Valparaíso, Chile | Peru | 3–0 | 3–0 | Friendly |
| 18. | 15 November 2014 | Estadio CAP, Talcahuano, Chile | Venezuela | 3–0 | 5–0 | Friendly |
| 19. | 11 June 2015 | Estadio Nacional, Santiago, Chile | Ecuador | 2–0 | 2–0 | 2015 Copa América |
| 20. | 15 June 2015 | Estadio Nacional, Santiago, Chile | Mexico | 2–2 | 3–3 | 2015 Copa América |
| 21. | 29 June 2015 | Estadio Nacional, Santiago, Chile | Peru | 1–0 | 2–1 | 2015 Copa América |
| 22. | 29 June 2015 | Estadio Nacional, Santiago, Chile | Peru | 2–1 | 2–1 | 2015 Copa América |
| 23. | 8 October 2015 | Estadio Nacional, Santiago, Chile | Brazil | 1–0 | 2–0 | 2018 FIFA World Cup qualification |
| 24. | 13 October 2015 | Estadio Nacional, Lima, Peru | Peru | 2–2 | 4–3 | 2018 FIFA World Cup qualification |
| 25. | 13 October 2015 | Estadio Nacional, Lima, Peru | Peru | 4–2 | 4–3 | 2018 FIFA World Cup qualification |
| 26. | 14 June 2016 | Lincoln Financial Field, Philadelphia, United States | Panama | 1–1 | 4–2 | Copa América Centenario |
| 27. | 14 June 2016 | Lincoln Financial Field, Philadelphia, United States | Panama | 2–1 | 4–2 | Copa América Centenario |
| 28. | 18 June 2016 | Levi's Stadium, Santa Clara, United States | Mexico | 2–0 | 7–0 | Copa América Centenario |
| 29. | 18 June 2016 | Levi's Stadium, Santa Clara, United States | Mexico | 4–0 | 7–0 | Copa América Centenario |
| 30. | 18 June 2016 | Levi's Stadium, Santa Clara, United States | Mexico | 5–0 | 7–0 | Copa América Centenario |
| 31. | 18 June 2016 | Levi's Stadium, Santa Clara, United States | Mexico | 6–0 | 7–0 | Copa América Centenario |
| 32. | 15 November 2016 | Estadio Nacional, Santiago, Chile | Uruguay | 1–1 | 3–1 | 2018 FIFA World Cup qualification |
| 33. | 13 June 2017 | Cluj Arena, Cluj-Napoca, Romania | Romania | 1–0 | 2–3 | Friendly |
| 34. | 18 June 2017 | Otkrytiye Arena, Moscow, Russia | Cameroon | 2–0 | 2–0 | 2017 FIFA Confederations Cup |
| 35. | 5 October 2017 | Estadio Nacional, Santiago, Chile | Ecuador | 1–0 | 2–1 | 2018 FIFA World Cup qualification |
| 36. | 6 June 2019 | Estadio La Portada, La Serena, Chile | Haiti | 1–1 | 2–1 | Friendly |
| 37. | 17 June 2019 | Estádio do Morumbi, São Paulo, Brazil | Japan | 2–0 | 4–0 | 2019 Copa América |
| 38. | 17 June 2019 | Estádio do Morumbi, São Paulo, Brazil | Japan | 4–0 | 4–0 | 2019 Copa América |
| 39. | 14 June 2021 | Estádio Olímpico Nilton Santos, Rio de Janeiro, Brazil | Argentina | 1–1 | 1–1 | 2021 Copa América |
| 40. | 21 June 2021 | Arena Pantanal, Cuiabá, Brazil | Uruguay | 1–0 | 1–1 | 2021 Copa América |
| 41. | 22 March 2024 | Stadio Ennio Tardini, Parma, Italy | Albania | 1–0 | 3–0 | Friendly |
| 42. | 11 June 2024 | Estadio Nacional, Santiago, Chile | Paraguay | 3–0 | 3–0 | Friendly |
| 43. | 10 September 2024 | Estadio Nacional, Santiago, Chile | Bolivia | 1–1 | 1–2 | 2026 FIFA World Cup qualification |
| 44. | 10 October 2024 | Estadio Nacional, Santiago, Chile | Brazil | 1–0 | 1–2 | 2026 FIFA World Cup qualification |
| 45. | 19 November 2024 | Estadio Nacional, Santiago, Chile | Venezuela | 1–1 | 4–2 | 2026 FIFA World Cup qualification |

== Honours ==
Universidad de Chile

- Primera División de Chile: 2011 Apertura, 2011 Clausura
- Copa Sudamericana: 2011

Napoli

- Coppa Italia: 2011–12

Tigres UANL

- Liga MX: Apertura 2017, Clausura 2019
- Campeón de Campeones: 2017, 2018
- Campeones Cup: 2018

Atlético Mineiro

- Campeonato Brasileiro Série A: 2021
- Copa do Brasil: 2021
- Campeonato Mineiro: 2021, 2022, 2023, 2024
- Supercopa do Brasil: 2022

Nacional

- Uruguayan Primera División: 2025

Chile

- Copa América: 2015, 2016

Individual

- Copa Sudamericana Player of the Tournament: 2011
- Copa Sudamericana Top Scorer: 2011
- Primera División de Chile Player of the Tournament: 2011
- Primera División de Chile Best Forward: 2011
- CONMEBOL Team of the Season: 2011
- Copa América Team of the Tournament: 2015, 2016
- Copa América Top Scorer: 2015, 2016
- China Cup Best Player: 2017

== See also ==
- List of men's footballers with 100 or more international caps
