= 1993 Copa Libertadores group stage =

The 1993 Copa Libertadores group stage (or first stage) was played from 3 February to 26 March 1996. A total of 20 teams competed in the group stage to decide 15 places in the final stages of the 1993 Copa Libertadores, where they joined defending champions São Paulo.

== Groups composition ==
Same as previous editions, the 20 participating teams were divided into 5 groups of 4, which consisted of two teams from one national association and two teams from another. The paired associations for this edition were as follows:

- Group 1: Peru and Venezuela
- Group 2: Bolivia and Chile
- Group 3: Ecuador and Uruguay
- Group 4: Brazil and Colombia
- Group 5: Argentina and Paraguay

== Format ==
In the group stage, each group was played on a home-and-away round-robin basis. The teams were ranked according to the following criteria: 1. Points (2 points for a win, 1 point for a draw, and 0 points for a loss); 2. Goal difference; 3. Goals scored; 4. Away goals scored; 5. Drawing of lots.

If two teams from the same national association tie on points, the above criteria would not apply and their final positions would be determined in an extra match to be played at a neutral venue within their own country. Winners of this match qualified for the round of 16; in the event of a draw, the team with the best goal difference in the group would have qualified.

The winners, runners-up and third placed teams of each group advanced to the round of 16 of the final stages.

== Groups ==
=== Group 1 ===
Pos	Team	Pld	W	D	L	GF	GA	GD	Pts	Qualification	UNI	SCR	MIN	CAR
1	(Peru) Universitario	6	3	3	0	14	7	+7	9	Round of 16	—	3–1	2–0	4–1
2	(Peru) Sporting Cristal	6	3	1	2	13	9	+4	7	Round of 16	2–2	—	6–2	0–1
3	(Venezuela) Minervén	6	1	2	3	6	12	−6	4 (Note: Play-off match: Minervén 1–0 Caracas.)	Round of 16	2–2	0–1	—	1–0
4	(Venezuela) Caracas	6	1	2	3	5	10	−5	4		1–1	1–3	1–1	—

Notes:
7 February 1993
16:00 UTC−4

Minervén (Venezuela)	1–0	(Venezuela) Caracas
Matuszyczk 60'	Report 1 Report 2

Polideportivo Cachamay, Ciudad Guayana
Attendance: 15,000
Referee: Francisco Farias (Venezuela)
10 February 1993
--:-- UTC−5

Universitario (Peru)	3–1	(Peru) Sporting Cristal
Martínez 32'; Baroni 37'; González 73'	Report	Torres 27'

Estadio Nacional, Lima
Attendance: 36,700
Referee: Fernando Chapell (Peru)

16 February 1993
16:00 UTC−5

Sporting Cristal (Peru)	0–1	(Venezuela) Caracas
	Report 1 Report 2	Letelier 56'

Estadio Nacional, Lima
Attendance: 10,000
Referee: Pablo Peña (Bolivia)
19 February 1993
--:-- UTC−5

Universitario (Peru)	4–1	(Venezuela) Caracas
Nunes 2', 47'; Baroni 31'; Carranza 67'	Report 1 Report 2	Díaz 31'

Estadio Nacional, Lima
Attendance: 30,000
Referee: Armando Aliaga (Bolivia)

2 March 1993
16:00 UTC−5

Sporting Cristal (Peru)	6–2	(Venezuela) Minervén
Marquinho 16'; Duffoo 17'; Maestri 22', 31', 51'; Baldessari 89'	Report 1 Report 2	Matuszyczk 50'; Camacho 82'

Estadio Nacional, Lima
Attendance: 7,314
Referee: Manoel Serapião Filho (Brazil)
5 March 1993
16:00 UTC−5

Universitario (Peru)	2–0	(Venezuela) Minervén
Baroni 44', 61'	Report 1 Report 2

Estadio Nacional, Lima
Referee: Cláudio Vinícius Cerdeira (Brazil)

10 March 1993
16:00 UTC−4

Caracas (Venezuela)	1–1	(Venezuela) Minervén
Mouro 37'	Report 1 Report 2	Jiménez 16' (o.g.)

Estadio Brígido Iriarte, Caracas
Attendance: 914
Referee: Álvaro Arboleda (Venezuela)
10 March 1993
--:-- UTC−5

Sporting Cristal (Peru)	2–2	(Peru) Universitario
Maestri 20'; Marquinho 49'	Report	González 29'; Baroni 43'

Estadio Nacional, Lima
Attendance: 23,955
Referee: Luis Seminario (Peru)

16 March 1993
16:00 UTC−4

Caracas (Venezuela)	1–3	(Peru) Sporting Cristal
Vogler 89'	Report 1 Report 2	Marquinho 24'; Maestri 57'; Ávila 74'

Estadio Brígido Iriarte, Caracas
Referee: John Toro (Colombia)
19 March 1993
16:00 UTC−4

Minervén (Venezuela)	0–1	(Peru) Sporting Cristal
	Report 1 Report 2	Maestri 89'

Polideportivo Cachamay, Ciudad Guayana
Attendance: 5,936
Referee: Juan Manuel Gómez (Colombia)

23 March 1998
16:00 UTC−4

Minervén (Venezuela)	2–2	(Peru) Universitario
Camacho 69' (pen.), 76' (pen.)	Report 1 Report 2	Baroni 31'; Martínez 54'

Polideportivo Cachamay, Ciudad Guayana
Attendance: 3,567
Referee: Luis Marin (Colombia)
26 March 1993
16:00 UTC−4

Caracas (Venezuela)	1–1	(Peru) Universitario
Miranda 56'	Report 1 Report 2	Tempone 24' (pen.)

Estadio Brígido Iriarte, Caracas
Attendance: 3,000
Referee: Jorge Zuluaga (Colombia)

==== Play-off match ====
As the Venezuelan teams were tied 4–4 on points, a play-off on a neutral ground within Venezuela was required to determine the third and fourth place.

31 March 1993
16:00 UTC−4

Minervén (Venezuela)	1–0	(Venezuela) Caracas
Matuszyczk 84'	Report 1 Report 2

Estadio José Antonio Anzoátegui, Puerto La Cruz
Referee: José Torres (Colombia)

=== Group 2 ===
Pos	Team	Pld	W	D	L	GF	GA	GD	Pts	Qualification	UCA	BOL	COB	SJO
1	(Chile) Universidad Católica	6	3	2	1	15	8	+7	8	Round of 16	—	3–0	1–1	4–1
2	(Bolivia) Bolívar	6	3	1	2	10	7	+3	7	Round of 16	3–1	—	3–0	3–1
3	(Chile) Cobreloa	6	2	3	1	8	9	−1	7	Round of 16	1–1	1–1	—	2–1
4	(Bolivia) San José	6	1	0	5	8	17	−9	2		2–5	1–0	2–3	—

24 February 1993
--:-- UTC−3

Cobreloa (Chile)	1–1	(Chile) Universidad Católica
Cornejo 38'	Report	Barrera 69'

Estadio Municipal de Calama, Calama
Attendance: 18,000
Referee: Enrique Marín (Chile)
25 February 1993
--:-- UTC−4

Bolívar (Bolivia)	3–1	(Bolivia) San José
Soria 27'; Etcheverry 47'; Borja 83'	Report	Peña 49'

Estadio Hernando Siles, La Paz
Attendance: 22,000
Referee: Armando Aliaga (Bolivia)

2 March 1993
--:-- UTC−4

Bolívar (Bolivia)	3–1	(Chile) Universidad Católica
Baldivieso 25', 47'; Hirano 49'	Report	Reinoso 69'

Estadio Hernando Siles, La Paz
Attendance: 38,558
Referee: Milton Villavicencio (Ecuador)
5 March 1993
--:-- UTC−4

San José (Bolivia)	2–5	(Chile) Universidad Católica
Quinteros 37'; Peña 87'	Report	Reinoso 16'; Barrera 18'; Cardozo 43'; Almada 51'; Contreras 60'

Estadio Jesús Bermúdez, Oruro
Attendance: 13,637
Referee: Marco Aguas (Ecuador)

9 March 1993
--:-- UTC−4

Bolívar (Bolivia)	3–0	(Chile) Cobreloa
Etcheverry 51' (pen.); Borja 70'; Baldivieso 80'	Report

Estadio Hernando Siles, La Paz
Attendance: 36,414
Referee: Alberto Tejada (Peru)
12 March 1993
--:-- UTC−4

San José (Bolivia)	2–3	(Chile) Cobreloa
Villegas 61'; Aramayo 75'	Report	González 53', 70'; Cornejo 87'

Estadio Jesús Bermúdez, Oruro
Attendance: 12,000
Referee: Fernando Chapell (Peru)

17 March 1993
--:-- UTC−4

San José (Bolivia)	1–0	(Bolivia) Bolívar
Aramayo 77' (pen.)	Report

Estadio Jesús Bermúdez, Oruro
Attendance: 33,000
Referee: Javier Rossell (Bolivia)
17 March 1993
--:-- UTC−4

Universidad Católica (Chile)	1–1	(Chile) Cobreloa
Barrera 21'	Report	Figueroa 50'

Estadio San Carlos de Apoquindo, Santiago
Referee: Carlos Robles (Chile)

23 March 1993
--:-- UTC−4

Cobreloa (Chile)	2–1	(Bolivia) San José
Figueroa 13' (pen.); Quinteros 57' (o.g.)	Report	Peña 63'

Estadio Municipal de Calama, Calama
Attendance: 9,280
Referee: Bonifacio Núñez (Paraguay)
26 March 1993
--:-- UTC−4

Universidad Católica (Chile)	4–1	(Bolivia) San José
Vargas 10' (o.g.); López 50'; Almada 53'; Barrera 75'	Report	Peña 57'

Estadio San Carlos de Apoquindo, Santiago
Attendance: 11,000
Referee: Efigenio Verdún (Paraguay)

30 March 1993
--:-- UTC−4

Cobreloa (Chile)	1–1	(Bolivia) Bolívar
Vera 7'	Report	Sandy 65'

Estadio Municipal de Calama, Calama
Attendance: 15,000
Referee: Javier Castrilli (Argentina)
2 April 1993
--:-- UTC−4

Universidad Católica (Chile)	3–0	(Bolivia) Bolívar
Almada 15', 90'; Reinoso 86'	Report

Estadio San Carlos de Apoquindo, Santiago
Referee: Francisco Lamolina (Argentina)

=== Group 3 ===
Pos	Team	Pld	W	D	L	GF	GA	GD	Pts	Qualification	NAC	ELN	BAR	BVI
1	(Uruguay) Nacional	6	3	2	1	12	6	+6	8	Round of 16	—	5–1	3–0	2–2
2	(Ecuador) El Nacional	6	3	0	3	9	11	−2	6	Round of 16	2–0	—	1–0	5–0
3	(Ecuador) Barcelona	6	2	1	3	8	7	+1	5	Round of 16	1–1	4–0	—	2–0
4	(Uruguay) Bella Vista	6	2	1	3	6	11	−5	5		0–1	2–0	2–1	—

17 February 1993
--:-- UTC−5

El Nacional (Ecuador)	1–0	(Ecuador) Barcelona
Chalá 14'	Report

Estadio Olímpico Atahualpa, Quito
Attendance: 30,000
Referee: Alfredo de Jesús Rodas (Ecuador)
17 February 1993
--:-- UTC−3

Nacional (Uruguay)	2–2	(Uruguay) Bella Vista
Dely Valdés 37'; Soca 67' (pen.)	Report	Ferraro 48' (pen.); Lujambio 89'

Estadio Centenario, Montevideo
Attendance: 7,170
Referee: Eduardo Dluzniewski (Uruguay)

23 February 1993
--:-- UTC−5

Barcelona (Ecuador)	2–0	(Uruguay) Bella Vista
Rosero 37'; Insúa 82'	Report

Estadio Monumental Isidro Romero Carbo, Guayaquil
Attendance: 9,513
Referee: Álvaro Arboleda (Venezuela)
26 February 1993
--:-- UTC−5

El Nacional (Ecuador)	5–0	(Uruguay) Bella Vista
Chérrez 18', 44'; Chalá 54'; Arroyo 66' (pen.); Carcelén 69'	Report

Estadio Olímpico Atahualpa, Quito
Referee: Nelson Rodríguez (Venezuela)

2 March 1993
--:-- UTC−5

Barcelona (Ecuador)	1–1	(Uruguay) Nacional
Muñoz 14'	Report	Dely Valdés 65'

Estadio Monumental Isidro Romero Carbo, Guayaquil
Attendance: 15,928
Referee: Aníbal Guillermo (Argentina)
5 March 1993
--:-- UTC−5

El Nacional (Ecuador)	2–0	(Uruguay) Nacional
Chalá 13'; Garay 53'	Report

Estadio Olímpico Atahualpa, Quito
Attendance: 39,275
Referee: Juan Carlos Loustau (Argentina)

10 March 1993
--:-- UTC−5

Barcelona (Ecuador)	4–0	(Ecuador) El Nacional
Avilés 8', 28', 56'; Tenorio 18'	Report

Estadio Monumental Isidro Romero Carbo, Guayaquil
Referee: Jorge Orellana (Ecuador)
10 March 1993
--:-- UTC−3

Bella Vista (Uruguay)	0–1	(Uruguay) Nacional
	Report	Dely Valdés 5'

Estadio Centenario, Montevideo
Referee: Saúl Feldmann (Uruguay)

16 March 1993
--:-- UTC−3

Bella Vista (Uruguay)	2–1	(Ecuador) Barcelona
Ferraro 40', 62'	Report	Zambrano 45'

Estadio Centenario, Montevideo
Referee: Cláudio Vinícius Cerdeira (Brazil)
19 March 1993
--:-- UTC−3

Nacional (Uruguay)	3–0	(Ecuador) Barcelona
García 31'; Dely Valdés 71'; González 82'	Report

Estadio Centenario, Montevideo
Attendance: 18,000
Referee: Oscar Roberto Godói (Brazil)

23 March 1993
--:-- UTC−3

Bella Vista (Uruguay)	2–0	(Ecuador) El Nacional
Ferraro 41', 42'	Report

Estadio Centenario, Montevideo
Attendance: 2,000
Referee: Félix Benegas (Paraguay)
26 March 1993
--:-- UTC−3

Nacional (Uruguay)	5–1	(Ecuador) El Nacional
Dely Valdés 13'; Suárez 31'; Lemos 68'; Miranda 78'; Soca 90'	Report	Chérrez 86'

Estadio Centenario, Montevideo
Attendance: 30,000
Referee: Juan Francisco Escobar (Paraguay)

=== Group 4 ===
Pos	Team	Pld	W	D	L	GF	GA	GD	Pts	Qualification	FLA	AME	ATN	INT
1	(Brazil) Flamengo	6	3	1	2	9	7	+2	7	Round of 16	—	1–3	3–1	3–1
2	(Colombia) América de Cali	6	3	1	2	12	11	+1	7 (Note: Play-off match: Atlético Nacional 2–4 América de Cali.)	Round of 16	2–1	—	0–3	4–2
3	(Colombia) Atlético Nacional	6	3	1	2	8	6	+2	7	Round of 16	0–1	3–2	—	0–0
4	(Brazil) Internacional	6	0	3	3	4	9	−5	3		0–0	1–1	0–1	—

Notes:
10 February 1993
--:-- UTC−3

Internacional (Brazil)	0–0	(Brazil) Flamengo
	Report

Estádio Beira-Rio, Porto Alegre
Attendance: 35,000
Referee: Márcio Rezende (Brazil)
11 February 1993
--:-- UTC−5

América de Cali (Colombia)	0–3	(Colombia) Atlético Nacional
	Report	Caicedo 4'; Tréllez 61' (pen.), 89'

Estadio Olímpico Pascual Guerrero, Cali
Attendance: 16,000
Referee: Jorge Zuluaga (Colombia)

16 February 1993
--:-- UTC−5

América de Cali (Colombia)	2–1	(Brazil) Flamengo
Pérez 12'; Da Silva 56'	Report	Nilson 27'

Estadio Olímpico Pascual Guerrero, Cali
Attendance: 15,000
Referee: Luis Seminario (Peru)
19 February 1993
--:-- UTC−5

Atlético Nacional (Colombia)	0–1	(Brazil) Flamengo
	Report	Renato Gaúcho 19'

Estadio Atanasio Girardot, Medellín
Attendance: 40,000
Referee: Alberto Tejada (Peru)

2 March 1993
--:-- UTC−3

Flamengo (Brazil)	1–3	(Colombia) América de Cali
Nilson 20'	Report	Da Silva 23'; Ferreira 49'; Rincón 60'

Maracanã Stadium, Rio de Janeiro
Attendance: 21,292
Referee: Juan Bava (Argentina)
5 March 1993
--:-- UTC−3

Internacional (Brazil)	1–1	(Colombia) América de Cali
Franco 12'	Report	Ferreira 10'

Estádio Beira-Rio, Porto Alegre
Attendance: 25,000
Referee: Juan Carlos Crespi (Argentina)

10 March 1993
--:-- UTC−3

Flamengo (Brazil)	3–1	(Brazil) Internacional
Marquinhos 3'; Paulo Nunes 20'; Marcelinho Carioca 77'	Report	Jairo Lenzi 84'

Maracanã Stadium, Rio de Janeiro
Referee: Oscar Roberto Godói (Brazil)
11 March 1993
--:-- UTC−5

Atlético Nacional (Colombia)	3–2	(Colombia) América de Cali
García 49'; Higuita 58' (pen.); Aristizábal 62'	Report	De Ávila 42'; Rincón 66'

Estadio Atanasio Girardot, Medellín
Attendance: 33,324
Referee: Enrique Marín (Chile)

16 March 1993
--:-- UTC−3

Internacional (Brazil)	0–1	(Colombia) Atlético Nacional
	Report	Aristizábal 82'

Estádio Beira-Rio, Porto Alegre
Attendance: 8,000
Referee: Ernesto Filippi (Uruguay)
19 March 1993
--:-- UTC−3

Flamengo (Brazil)	3–1	(Colombia) Atlético Nacional
Gottardo 13'; Júnior 28'; Nélio 39'	Report	Fajardo 63'

Maracanã Stadium, Rio de Janeiro
Attendance: 4,000
Referee: José da Rosa (Uruguay)

23 March 1993
--:-- UTC−5

América de Cali (Colombia)	4–2	(Brazil) Internacional
Escobar 16'; Da Silva 22', 52'; Rincón 40'	Report	Élson 36'; Rudinei 78'

Estadio Olímpico Pascual Guerrero, Cali
Attendance: 16,619
Referee: Alfredo de Jesús Rodas (Ecuador)
26 March 1993
--:-- UTC−5

Atlético Nacional (Colombia)	0–0	(Brazil) Internacional
	Report

Estadio Atanasio Girardot, Medellín
Attendance: 16,816
Referee: Jorge Orellana (Ecuador)

==== Play-off match ====
As the Colombian teams were tied 7–7 on points, a play-off on a neutral ground within Colombia was required to determine the second and third place.

2 April 1993
--:-- UTC−5

América de Cali (Colombia)	4-2	(Colombia) Atlético Nacional
De Ávila 11'; Escobar 12'; Pérez 34'; Maturana 42'	Report	Caicedo 9'; Tréllez 60' (pen.)

Estadio El Campín, Bogotá
Attendance: 35,000
Referee: Milton Villavicencio (Ecuador)

=== Group 5 ===
Pos	Team	Pld	W	D	L	GF	GA	GD	Pts	Qualification	CPO	NOB	OLI	RIV
1	(Paraguay) Cerro Porteño	6	2	3	1	5	4	+1	7	Round of 16	—	0–0	0–0	2–1
2	(Argentina) Newell's Old Boys	6	1	4	1	4	4	0	6 (Note: Away goals scored: Newell's Old Boys 2, Olimpia 1.)	Round of 16	1–2	—	1–1	0–0
3	(Paraguay) Olimpia	6	1	4	1	4	4	0	6	Round of 16	1–0	1–1	—	1–1
4	(Argentina) River Plate	6	1	3	2	4	5	−1	5		1–1	0–1	1–0	—

Notes:
5 February 1993
--:-- UTC−3

Cerro Porteño (Paraguay)	0–0	(Paraguay) Olimpia
	Report

Estadio Defensores del Chaco, Asunción
Attendance: 25,000
Referee: Óscar Velázquez (Paraguay)
7 February 1993
--:-- UTC−2

River Plate (Argentina)	0–1	(Argentina) Newell's Old Boys
	Report	Zamora 70'

Estadio Monumental, Buenos Aires
Attendance: 10,167
Referee: Francisco Lamolina (Argentina)

12 February 1993
--:-- UTC−3

Cerro Porteño (Paraguay)	0–0	(Argentina) Newell's Old Boys
	Report

Estadio Defensores del Chaco, Asunción
Attendance: 30,000
Referee: Hernán Silva (Chile)
23 February 1993
--:-- UTC−3

Olimpia (Paraguay)	1–1	(Argentina) Newell's Old Boys
González 9'	Report	Saldaña 26'

Estadio Defensores del Chaco, Asunción
Attendance: 30,000
Referee: Hernán Silva (Chile)

23 February 1993
--:-- UTC−3

Cerro Porteño (Paraguay)	2–1	(Argentina) River Plate
Chávez 1'; Astrada 81' (o.g.)	Report	Medina Bello 23'

Estadio General Pablo Rojas, Asunción
Attendance: 30,000
Referee: Márcio Rezende (Brazil)
26 February 1993
--:-- UTC−3

Olimpia (Paraguay)	1–1	(Argentina) River Plate
González 70'	Report	Medina Bello 55'

Estadio Defensores del Chaco, Asunción
Attendance: 25,000
Referee: Jose Aparecido de Oliveira (Brazil)

10 March 1993
--:-- UTC−3

Olimpia (Paraguay)	1–0	(Paraguay) Cerro Porteño
Amarilla 7'	Report

Estadio Defensores del Chaco, Asunción
Attendance: 30,000
Referee: Manoel Serapião Filho (Brazil)
10 March 1993
--:-- UTC−3

Newell's Old Boys (Argentina)	0–0	(Argentina) River Plate
	Report

El Coloso del Parque, Rosario
Attendance: 16,344
Referee: Juan Carlos Biscay (Argentina)

16 March 1993
--:-- UTC−3

River Plate (Argentina)	1–1	(Paraguay) Cerro Porteño
Díaz 69'	Report	Rossi 33'

Estadio Monumental, Buenos Aires
Attendance: 22,316
Referee: Hernán Silva (Chile)
19 March 1993
--:-- UTC−3

Newell's Old Boys (Argentina)	1–2	(Paraguay) Cerro Porteño
Martino 84'	Report	Ferreira 39', 73'

El Coloso del Parque, Rosario
Attendance: 11,906
Referee: Salvador Imperatore (Chile)

23 March 1993
--:-- UTC−3

Newell's Old Boys (Argentina)	1–1	(Paraguay) Olimpia
Pochettino 21'	Report	Pochettino 13' (o.g.)

El Coloso del Parque, Rosario
Attendance: 22,000
Referee: Julio Matto (Uruguay)
26 March 1993
--:-- UTC−3

River Plate (Argentina)	1–0	(Paraguay) Olimpia
Lavallén 87'	Report

Estadio Monumental, Buenos Aires
Attendance: 1,214
Referee: Eduardo Dluzniewski (Uruguay)
