= Bailando 2011 =

- Season 2011
- The cast of Bailando 2011
- Presented by: Marcelo Tinelli

Release
- Original network: El Trece
- Original release: May 16 – December 22, 2011

Season chronology
- ← Previous; Bailando 2010 Next → Bailando 2012

Bailando 2011 was the seventh Argentinean season of Bailando por un Sueño. The season premiere aired on May 16, 2011, on El Trece with 30 couples, including same-sex pairs for the first time in the Argentinean show – José María Muscari in the male couple; in the female couple, initially Silvina and Vanina Escudero, then Silvina Escudero and Sofía Pachano – and, for the first time in the world, a contestant with dwarfism: Noelia Pompa, a singer. The premiere featured special appearances by Mariano Martinez, Carolina "Pampita" Ardohaín, Ariel "El Burrito" Ortega, Alberto Cormillot (the physician of Cuestión de Peso (Argentina)), and Griselda Siciliani, who performed dance routines during the show's opening. The competition began on May 17 and featured a special guest, the Brazilian footballer Ronaldinho. The premiere drew a 37.1% rating, smashing the competition. As in previous seasons the cast also included international celebrities: Pamela Anderson, Mike Tyson and Larissa Riquelme.

The jury initially consisted of Graciela Alfano, Flavio Mendoza, Moria Casán, Anibal Pachano, and Carmen Barbieri. In weeks 3, 5, and 6 Carmen was replaced by Marcelo Polino, but she returned following the departure of Graciela Alfano. Later Graciela came back to replace Carmen in Rotating room and Music from the Movies round.

The winner was revealed on the season finale, on December 22, 2011: singer Noelia Pompa, paired with professional classic dancer Hernán Piquín, with 52.59% of the public vote.

== Couples ==
Celebrity	Notability	Professional Partner	Status
Rocío Marengo	Model	Leonardo Piccinato	Eliminated 1st by the 28.32%
Jorge "Locomotora" Castro	Boxer	Sofía Macaggi	Eliminated 2nd by the 47.49%
Mike Tyson	Boxer	Lakiha Spicer	Withdrew
Hernán Cabanas	Soñando por Bailar 2011 runner-up	Dominique Pestaña	Eliminated 3rd by the 43.27%
Hernán Cabanas	Model	Dominique Pestaña	Eliminated 3rd by the 43.27%
Pamela Anderson	Actress and Model	Damian Whitewood	Withdrew
Cristina "La Negra" Galiano	Fabio "La Mole" Moli's wife	Fernando Castro	Eliminated 4th by the 45.18%
Wanda Nara	Model and TV Presenter	–	Withdrew
Jorge "Negrito" Luengo^{[a]}	Television producer	Yanil García	Eliminated 5th by the 36.75%
Nicole Neumann	Top Model	Nicolás Scillama	Eliminated 6th by the 31.77%
Rocío Guirao Díaz	Model	–	Withdrew
Fabio "La Mole" Moli	Boxer	Mariana Conci	Eliminated 7th by the 41.31%
Carolina "Pampita" Ardohaín^{[d]}	Top Model	Carlos Bernal	Withdrew
José María Muscari	Theatre Director	Emanuel González	Eliminated 8th by the 18.41%
Daniel Gómez Rinaldi	Journalist	Ana Laura López	Eliminated 9th by the 27.32%
Nicolás Riera	Actor	Judith Kovalovsky	Eliminated 10th by the 28.64%
Vanina Escudero	Dancer and TV Personality	–	Withdrew
Erika Mitdank	Model	Cristian Falcón	Eliminated 11th by the 14.87%
Evangelina Anderson^{[e]}	Model	Carlos Bernal	Eliminated 12th by the 16.54%
Marcelo Iripino	Dancer and Choreographer	Georgina Tirotta	Eliminated 13th by the 27.00%
Tony Kamo	Mentalist	Sol Giulietti	Eliminated 14th by the 27.35%
Mónica González	Dancer	Maximiliano D'Iorio	Eliminated 15th by the 45.57%
Mónica Farro	Vedette	Christian Ponce	Eliminated 16th by the 30.97%
Zaira Nara^{[c]}	Model and Television presenter	Pier Fritzche	Eliminated 17th by the 19.86%
Jimena Barón	Actress	Facundo Mazzei	Eliminated 18th by the 38.22%
María Eugenia Ritó	Vedette	Nicolás Scillama^{[h]}	Eliminated 19th by the 15.18%
Denise Dumas	Television presenter	Alejandro Gallego	Eliminated 20th by the 37.52%
Eugenia Lemos	Soñando por Bailar 2011 winner	Leonardo Piccinato^{[g]}	Eliminated 21st by the 25.91%
Larissa Riquelme	Model	Fernando Bertona	Eliminated 22nd by the 44.37%
Adabel Guerrero	Vedette	Martín Whitencamp	Eliminated 23rd by the 41.28%
Silvina Escudero	Dancer and TV Personality	Sofía Pachano^{[f]}	Eliminated 24th by the 26.76%
Silvina Escudero	Dancer	Sofía Pachano^{[f]}	Eliminated 24th by the 26.76%
Cinthia Fernández	TV Personality	Gabriel Usandivaras	Eliminated 25th by the 33.15%
Pedro "Peter" Alfonso	Actor	Julieta Sciancalepore	Eliminated 26th by the 43.02%
Patricia "Coki" Ramírez	Singer	Juan Leandro Nimo	Semifinalists by the 42.57%
Paula Chaves^{[b]}	Top Model	Pablo Juin	Semifinalists by the 41.06%
Héctor "Tito" Speranza	Celebrity Bodyguard	Nadia Hair	Runners-Up by the 47.41%
Hernán Piquín	Dancer	Noelia Pompa	Winners by the 52.59%
Hernán Piquín	TV Personality	Noelia Pompa	Winners by the 52.59%

- ^[a] Mike Tyson left the competition, and Jorge "Negrito" Luengo entered in his place.
- ^[b] Pamela Anderson left the competition, and Paula Chaves entered in her place.
- ^[c] Wanda Nara left the competition, and Zaira Nara entered in her place.
- ^[d] Rocío Guirao Díaz left the competition, and Carolina "Pampita" Ardohaín entered in her place.
- ^[e] Carolina "Pampita" Ardohaín left the competition, and Evangelina Anderson entered in her place.
- ^[f] Vanina Escudero left the competition, and Sofía Pachano entered in her place.
- ^[g] Franco Tabernero was the original partner, but he left the competition after Disco's round.
- ^[h] Juan Pablo Battaglia was the original partner, but he left the competition after Strip dance's round.

== Scoring chart ==
Celebrity	Place																									
Celebrity	Place	01	02	03	04	05	06	07	08	09	10	11	12	13	14	15	16	17	18	19	20	21	22	SF		F
Celebrity	Place	01	02	03	04	05	06	07	08	09	10	11	12	13	14	15	16	17	18	19	20	21	22	1	2	F
Hernán P. & Noelia	1	46	50	47	36	39	44	50	33	40	44	41^{[8]}	34	30	35	31	37	45	35	34	39	33	SAFE	6		7
Tito	2	39	38	28	28	33	35	37^{[5]}	30	24	24	36	19	36	38	34	28	34	28	28	41	35	SAFE		7	1
Paula	3/4				*	37	30	31	40	38	41	39	30	43	40	42	44	34	35	34	40	33	SAFE		1	
Coki	3/4	35	40	33	35	36	37	31	30	31	29	39	44	39	26	36	28	26	33	34	39	43	SAFE	2		
Peter	5	35	45	41	39	38	30	40	30	38	42	29	34	25	38	41	28	26	33	34	40	46	ELIM			
Cinthia	6	46	48	47	45	37	37	43	40	38	45	38	35	45	28	48	36	33	43	41	34	38				
Silvina & Vanina	7	40	44	32	36	43	42	37	41^{[6]}	43^{[6]}	32	37	23	43	33	34	28	34	28	40	32					
Adabel	8	48	47	35	39	44	33	43	40	36	43	38	37	42	40	34	34	26	40	28						
Larissa	9	35	35	39^{[1]}	34^{[1]}	32	37	33	30	42	29	34	23	27	35	31	37	30	22							
Eugenia	10	40	37	28	34	37	25	30	40	28	31	40	34	32	26	31	37	30								
Denise	11	34	38	30	30	40	25	34	30	17	40^{[7]}	34^{[7]}	28	30	23	39^{[7]}	34									
M. Eugenia	12	40	39	40	37	32^{[2]}	38	39	38	24	36	42	33	27	31	39	20									
Jimena	13	48	38	35	42	36	40	33	32	40	45	34	39	41	31	31										
Zaira	14						37	32	39	29	32	34	32	27	26	23										
Mónica F.	15	44	45	39	33	39	35	31	32	34	34	44	28	37	26											
Mónica G.	16	44	42	35	40	32	36	32^{[4]}	27^{[4]}	31^{[4]}	37^{[4]}	33	32	30												
Tony	17	37	38	33	28	23	35	40	27	31	37	29	23													
Marcelo	18	49	41	37	33	38	37	31	31	36	42	33														
Evangelina	19									35	39	29														
Erika	20	34	35	30	38	39	25	36	27	24	31															
Nicolás	21	38	43	38	27	34	30	40	31	24																
Daniel	22	31	35	30	35	27	29^{[3]}	35^{[3]}	27																	
José María	23	43	41	38	31	45	40	37	24																	
Pampita	N/A							42	36																	
Mole	24	44	43	34	31	33	39	23																		
Nicole	25	35	43	37	31	33	29																			
Rocío G.	N/A	44	44	40	34	32	40																			
Negrito	26			39	35	27																				
Wanda	N/A	37	40	35	33	42																				
Negra	27	29	37	27	30																					
Pamela	N/A	39	36	33	30																					
Hernán C. & Dominique	28	36	38	27																						
Mike	N/A	42	38																							
Locomotora	29	43	35																							
Rocío M.	30	31																								

Red numbers indicate the lowest score for each week.
Green numbers indicate the highest score for each week.
indicates the couple eliminated that week.
indicates the couple was saved by the public.
indicates the couple was saved by the jury.
indicates the couple withdrew.
indicates the winning couple.
indicates the runner-up couple.
indicates the semifinalists couples.

- In the second duel Larissa Riquelme was replaced by Andrea Ghidone and Pamela Anderson by Virginia Gallardo.
- In the ninth duel Denise Dumas was replaced by Sofía Zámolo.
- Pamela Anderson & Damian Whitewood withdrew the competition in Round 4. As they were sentenced, the new permanent couple that was replacing them (Paula Chaves & Pablo Juín) was saved by the judges.
- From the round 11 Vanina Escudero was replaced by Sofía Pachano.
- In round 22, all the teams danced Acrobatic Salsa as they were in a sentence, so there were no scores. The safe couples, were the semifinalists
- ^[1] replaced by Andrea Ghidone.
- ^[2] replaced by Claudia Ciardone.
- ^[3] replaced by Manuel Navarrete.
- ^[4] replaced by Belén Francese.
- ^[5] replaced by Naim "Turco" Sibara.
- ^[6] Silvina was replaced by Álvaro "Waldo" Navia.
- ^[7] replaced by Virginia Gallardo.
- ^[8] Noelia was replaced by Marcela Feudale.

=== Highest and lowest scoring performances ===
The best and worst performances in each dance according to the judges' marks are as follows:

Dance	Best dancer(s)	Best score	Worst dancer(s)	Worst score
Latin pop	Marcelo Iripino	49	Cristina "La Negra" Galiano	29
Cha-cha-cha	Hernán Piquín & Noelia Pompa	50	Daniel Gómez Rinaldi; Erika Mitdank; Larissa Riquelme; Jorge "Locomotora" Castro	35
Adagio	Hernán Piquín & Noelia Pompa; Cinthia Fernández	47	Cristina "La Negra" Galiano; Hernán Cabanas & Dominique Pestaña	27
Axé music	Cinthia Fernández	45	Nicolás Riera	27
Reggaeton	José María Muscari	45	Tony Kamo	23
Argentine cumbia	Hernán Piquín & Noelia Pompa	44	Denise Dumas; Eugenia Lemos; Erika Mitdank	25
Pole dance	Hernán Piquín & Noelia Pompa	50	Fabio "La Mole" Moli	23
Latin adagio	Álvaro "Waldo" Navia & Vanina Escudero	41	José María Muscari	24
Cuarteto	Álvaro "Waldo" Navia & Vanina Escudero	43	Denise Dumas	17
Disco	Cinthia Fernández; Jimena Barón	45	Héctor "Tito" Speranza	24
Strip dance	Mónica Farro	44	Evangelina Anderson; Pedro "Peter" Alfonso; Tony Kamo	29
Electro dance	Coki Ramírez	44	Héctor "Tito" Speranza	19
Merengue	Cinthia Fernández	45	Pedro "Peter" Alfonso	25
Music video	Adabel Guerrero; Paula Chaves	40	Denise Dumas	23
Aquadance	Cinthia Fernández	48	Zaira Nara	23
Arabic music	Paula Chaves	44	María Eugenia Ritó	20
Dancing in the rain	Hernán Piquín & Noelia Pompa	45	Pedro "Peter" Alfonso; Adabel Guerrero	26
Adagio from telenovelas	Cinthia Fernández	43	Larissa Riquelme	22
Tribute to Gilda and Rodrigo	Cinthia Fernández	41	Adabel Guerrero; Héctor "Tito" Speranza	28
Rotating room	Héctor "Tito" Speranza	41	Silvina Escudero & Sofía Pachano	32
Music from Movies	Pedro "Peter" Alfonso	46	Paula Chaves; Hernán Piquín & Noelia Pompa	33

== Styles, scores and songs ==
Secret vote is in bold text.

=== May ===
Latin pop
Date	Couple	Style	Song	Score					Total
Date	Couple	Style	Song	Graciela	Flavio	Moria	Anibal	Carmen	Total
May 17	Silvina & Vanina	Latin pop	David Bisbal – "Bulería"	8	8	8	9	**7**	40
May 17	Mike & Lakiha	Latin pop	Chayanne – "Boom Boom"	10	9	8	8	**7**	42
May 19	Peter & Julieta	Latin pop	Chayanne – "Provócame"	10	9	7	4	**5**	35
May 19	Nicole & Nicolás	Latin pop	Paulina Rubio – "Baila Casanova"	7	9	8	5	**6**	35
May 19	Nicolás & Judith	Latin pop	Chayanne – "Caprichosa"	9	7	8	4	**10**	38
May 19	Locomotora & Sofía	Latin pop	Chayanne – "Enamorado"	8	8	10	8	**9**	45
May 19	Cinthia & Gabriel	Latin pop	Ricky Martin – "María"	8	9	10	9	**10**	46
May 20	Mónica G. & Maxi	Latin pop	Thalía – "Mujer Latina"	8	10	10	6	**10**	44
May 20	Coki & Juan Leandro	Latin pop	Shakira – "Te Aviso, Te Anuncio (Tango)"	7	7	8	4	**9**	35
May 20	Tony & Sol	Latin pop	David Bisbal – "Oye El Boom"	8	8	8	5	**8**^{[j1]}	37
May 23	Mole & Mariana	Latin pop	Don Omar featuring Lucenzo – "Danza Kuduro"	8	8	10	8	**10**	44
May 23	Negra & Fernando	Latin pop	Thalía – "Amar sin ser amada"	7	9	5	4	**4**	29
May 23	Rocío M. & Leo	Latin pop	Thalía – "¿A quién le importa?"	7	7	7	4	**6**	31
May 24	Wanda & Pier	Latin pop	David Bisbal – "Lloraré las penas"	7	8	8	6	**8**	37
May 24	Pamela & Damian	Latin pop	Jennifer Lopez featuring Pitbull – "On the Floor"	10	9	7	5	**8**	39
May 24	Jimena & Facundo	Latin pop	Thalía – "Arrasando"	10	9	10	9	**10**	48
May 24	Hernán & Dominique	Latin pop	Ricky Martin – "Por Arriba, Por Abajo"	9	8	8	4	**7**	36
May 26	Eugenia & Franco	Latin pop	Ricky Martin – "Shake Your Bon-Bon"	9	9	9	5	**8**	40
May 26	Denise & Alejandro	Latin pop	Ricky Martin – "Livin' la Vida Loca"	10	8	8	3	**5**	34
May 26	Noelia & Hernán	Latin pop	Chayanne – "Ay Mamá"	10	10	9	9	**8**	46
May 26	Erika & Cristian	Latin pop	Chayanne – "Mira Ven, Ven"	9	8	7	4	**6**	34
May 27	Adabel & Martín	Latin pop	David Bisbal – "Ave María"	10	9	10	9	**10**	48
May 27	Larissa & Fernando	Latin pop	Shakira – "Loba"	8	7	8	5	**7**	35
May 27	J. María & Emanuel	Latin pop	Chayanne – "Torero"	10	8	9	6	**10**	43
May 27	Daniel & Ana Laura	Latin pop	Ricky Martin – "Dime Que Me Quieres"	8	8	7	3	**5**	31
May 27	Mónica F. & Christian	Latin pop	Chayanne – "Baila Baila"	10	8	8	8	**10**	44
May 30	Rocío G. & Carlos	Latin pop	Shakira – "Loca"	8	8	9	9	**10**	44
May 30	Marcelo & Georgina	Latin pop	Ricky Martin – "Pégate"	9	10	10	10	**10**	49
May 30	Tito & Nadia	Latin pop	Chayanne – "Salomé"	9	10	9	5	**6**	39
May 30	M. Eugenia & Juan P.	Latin pop	Ricky Martin – "She Bangs"	10	9	9	5	**7**	40

=== June ===
Cha-cha-cha, Adagio and Axé music
Date	Couple	Style	Song	Score					Total
Date	Couple	Style	Song	Graciela	Flavio	Moria	Anibal	Carmen	Total
June 2	Silvina & Vanina	Cha-cha-cha	Dark Latin Groove – "Got A Hook On You (DLG Blues)"	9	7	10	**8**	10	44
June 2	Mike & Lakiha	Cha-cha-cha	Ricky Martin – "Amor"	10	7	9	**6**	6	38
June 2	Mónica G. & Maxi	Cha-cha-cha	Thalía – "Echa Pa' Lante"	10	8	9	**6**	9	42
June 3	Tony & Sol	Cha-cha-cha	Caetano Veloso – "Capullito de Alelí"	10	7	8	**5**	8	38
June 3	Peter & Julieta	Cha-cha-cha	Michael Stuart – "Déjala que Baile"	10	9	10	**6**	10	45
June 3	Eugenia & Franco	Cha-cha-cha	Marcela Morelo featuring Bahiano – "Para Toda la Vida"	8	9	8	**5**	7	37
June 3	Cinthia & Gabriel	Cha-cha-cha	Marc Anthony – "Dímelo"	10	10	10	**8**	10	48
June 6	Wanda & Pier	Cha-cha-cha	Ricky Martin – "Amor"	7	8	7	**8**	10	40
June 6	Rocío G. & Carlos	Cha-cha-cha	Pussycat Dolls – "Perhaps, Perhaps, Perhaps"	7	9	8	**10**	10	44
June 6	Coki & Juan Leandro	Cha-cha-cha	Celia Cruz – "Oye Como Va"	10	7	8	**6**	9	40
June 6	Hernán & Dominique	Cha-cha-cha	Jennifer Lopez – "Cariño"	10	7	6	**5**	10	38
June 7	Mole & Mariana	Cha-cha-cha	Mimí Maura – "Yo No Lloro Más"	9	8	10	**6**	10	43
June 7	Negra & Fernando	Cha-cha-cha	Rey Ruiz – "Ay Mujer!"	10	8	7	**4**	8	37
June 7	Pamela & Damian	Cha-cha-cha	ZZ Top – "Gimme All Your Lovin'"	7	6	5	**8**	10	36
June 7	Adabel & Martín	Cha-cha-cha	Pussycat Dolls – "Sway"	8	10	10	**9**	10	47
June 9	Noelia & Hernán	Cha-cha-cha	Celia Cruz – "Ríe y Llora"	10	10	10	**10**	10	50
June 9	Marcelo & Georgina	Cha-cha-cha	Luis Miguel – "La Última Noche"	9	8	8	**7**	9	41
June 9	Nicolás & Judith	Cha-cha-cha	Santana featuring Maná – "Corazón espinado"	10	8	9	**6**	10	43
June 9	M. Eugenia & Juan P.	Cha-cha-cha	Son by Four – "Sofía"	8	6	8	**7**	10	39
June 9	Erika & Cristian	Cha-cha-cha	La India featuring Tito Puente – "Fever"	7	8	7	**5**	8	35
June 10	Nicole & Nicolás	Cha-cha-cha	Jennifer Lopez – "Let's Get Loud"	10	10	9	**7**	7^{[j2]}	43
June 10	Denise & Alejandro	Cha-cha-cha	Miguel Sáez – "Mala Mujer"	9	8	8	**5**	8^{[j2]}	38
June 10	J. María & Emanuel	Cha-cha-cha	Celia Cruz – "La Negra Tiene Tumbao"	10	8	10	**5**	8^{[j2]}	41
June 10	Mónica F. & Christian	Cha-cha-cha	Jennifer Lopez and Chayanne – "Dame (Touch Me)"	7	10	10	**8**	10^{[j2]}	45
June 10	Locomotora & Sofía	Cha-cha-cha	La Mosca – "Cha Cha Cha"	8	8	9	**5**	5^{[j2]}	35
June 13	Jimena & Facundo	Cha-cha-cha	Christina Aguilera – "Falsas esperanzas"	10	8	8	**6**	6^{[j2]}	38
June 13	Larissa & Fernando	Cha-cha-cha	Ednita Nazario – "Tres Deseos"	6	8	7	**7**	7^{[j2]}	35
June 13	Tito & Nadia	Cha-cha-cha	Rubén Rada – "Cha Cha Muchacha"	9	8	8	**6**	7^{[j2]}	38
June 13	Daniel & Ana Laura	Cha-cha-cha	Rey Ruiz – "Muévelo"	8	7	8	**4**	8^{[j2]}	35
June 16	Silvina & Vanina	Adagio	George Michael – "Careless Whisper"	8	9	**7**	4	4^{[j2]}	32
June 16	Peter & Julieta	Adagio	Aerosmith – "I Don't Want to Miss a Thing"	10	9	**9**	6	7^{[j2]}	41
June 16	J. María & Emanuel	Adagio	Guns N' Roses – "November Rain"	10	9	**7**	5	7^{[j2]}	38
June 16	Adabel & Martín	Adagio	Chris DeBurgh – "Lady in Red"	9	8	**7**	6	5^{[j2]}	35
June 17	Nicole & Nicolás	Adagio	Toni Braxton – "Unbreak my Heart"	10	9	**7**	6	5^{[j2]}	30
June 17	Mónica G. & Maxi	Adagio	Mariah Carey – "I Want to Know What Love Is"	9	8	**8**	5	5^{[j2]}	35
June 17	Nicolás & Judith	Adagio	Robbie Williams – "Angel"	10	8	**9**	6	5^{[j2]}	38
June 17	Mónica F. & Christian	Adagio	Bad English – "When I See You Smile"	10	8	**8**	6	7^{[j2]}	39
June 17	Eugenia & Franco	Adagio	A-ha – "Crying in the Rain"	8	7	**6**	4	3^{[j2]}	28
June 20	Jimena & Facundo	Adagio	Celine Dion – "All by Myself"	10	8	**8**	5	4^{[j2]}	35
June 20	Coki & Juan Leandro	Adagio	Prince – "Purple Rain"	9	9	**7**	4	4^{[j2]}	33
June 20	Tito & Nadia	Adagio	Bobby Hatfield – "Unchained Melody"	7	8	**6**	3	4^{[j2]}	28
June 21	Wanda & Pier	Adagio	Bonnie Tyler – "Total Eclipse of the Heart"	4	9	**9**	7	6^{[j2]}	35
June 21	Marcelo & Georgina	Adagio	Scorpions – "Still Loving You"	10	8	**10**	6	3^{[j2]}	37
June 21	Pamela & Damian	Adagio	Bonnie Raitt – "I Can't Make You Love Me"	9	6	**4**	4	10^{[j2]}	33
June 23	Rocío G. & Carlos	Adagio	Whitney Houston – "I Will Always Love You"	10	9	**9**	6	6^{[j2]}	40
June 23	Noelia & Hernán	Adagio	Jessica Simpson – "Take My Breath Away"	10	10	**10**	7	10^{[j2]}	47
June 23	Negra & Fernando	Adagio	Gary Moore – "Still Got the Blues"	9	7	**6**	3	2^{[j2]}	27
June 23	Hernán & Dominique	Adagio	Europe – "Carrie"	10	6	**5**	3	3^{[j2]}	27
June 24	Tony & Sol	Adagio	Lionel Richie – "Hello"	10	8	**6**	5	4^{[j2]}	33
June 24	Mole & Mariana	Adagio	Laura Branigan – "The Power Of Love"	10	9	**6**	4	5^{[j2]}	34
June 24	Cinthia & Gabriel	Adagio	Melissa Manchester – "Through The Eyes of Love"	10	10	**10**	8	9^{[j2]}	47
June 24	Daniel & Ana Laura	Adagio	Billy Joel – "Honesty"	10	7	**8**	3	2^{[j2]}	30
June 24	Andrea & Fernando	Adagio	Barry Manilow – "Mandy"	9	8	**8**	7	7^{[j2]}	39
June 27	Denise & Alejandro	Adagio	Mariah Carey – "Without You"	9	8	**8**	3	2^{[j2]}	30
June 27	Negrito & Yanil	Adagio	Celine Dion – "My Heart Will Go On"	10	9	**9**	5	6^{[j2]}	39
June 27	M. Eugenia & Juan P.	Adagio	Laura Branigan – "The Power of Love"	9	9	**10**	5	7^{[j2]}	40
June 27	Erika & Cristian	Adagio	Roxette – "It Must Have Been Love"	9	7	**7**	4	3^{[j2]}	30
June 30	Peter & Julieta	Axé music	É o Tchan! – "Segura o Tchan"	10	**9**	9	6	5	39
June 30	Mónica F. & Christian	Axé music	Terra Samba – "Guti Guti do Terra"	9	**8**	7	6	4	34
June 30	Pamela & Damian	Axé music	The Black Eyed Peas – "Hey Mama"	8	**5**	5	4	8	30
June 30	Marcelo & Georgina	Axé music	Patrulha do Samba – "Swing de Rua"	9	**8**	8	5	3	33

=== July ===
Axé music and Reggaeton
Date	Couple	Style	Song	Score					Total
Date	Couple	Style	Song	Graciela	Flavio	Moria	Anibal	Marcelo	Total
July 4	Silvina & Vanina	Axé music	Asa de Águia – "Dança do Vampiro"	8	**8**	10	6	4	36
July 4	Negrito & Yanil	Axé music	Banda Cheiro de Amor – "A Dança da Sensual"	9	**8**	7	6	5	35
July 4	Cinthia & Gabriel	Axé music	Terra Samba – "Na Manteiga"	10	**10**	10	8	7	45
July 5	Wanda & Pier	Axé music	João Bosco & Vinícius – "Chora Me Liga"	6	**7**	8	5	7	33
July 5	Coki & Juan Leandro	Axé music	Asa de Águia – "Dança da Manivela"	10	**8**	8	6	3	35
July 5	Nicolás & Judith	Axé music	Companhia do Pagode – "Dança do Canguru"	9	**6**	5	4	3	27
July 7	Noelia & Hernán	Axé music	Nossa Juventude – "Dig Dig Lambe Lambe"	10	**10**	7	5	4	36
July 7	Mole & Mariana	Axé music	É o Tchan! – "Dança do Ventre"	9	**8**	7	4	3	31
July 7	Eugenia & Franco	Axé music	É o Tchan! – "Tchan No Hawai"	9	**8**	8	4	5	34
July 8	Denise & Alejandro	Axé music	Tchakabum – "Dança da Mãozinha"	10	**5**	10	2	3	30
July 8	Mónica G. & Maxi	Axé music	Ivete Sangalo – "A Galera"	10	**7**	10	7	6	40
July 8	J. María & Emanuel	Axé music	Tchakabum – "Aninha na Praia"	7	**7**	8	5	4	31
July 8	Nicole & Nicolás	Axé music	É o Tchan! – "Disque Tchan (Alô Tchan)"	9	**8**	7	4	3	31
July 8	Daniel & Ana Laura	Axé music	Carrapicho – "Tic, Tic Tac"	9	**7**	10	2	7	35
July 12	Tito & Nadia	Axé music	Grupo Cafuné – "Dança do Maluquinho"	8	**7**	5	6	2	28
July 12	Andrea & Fernando	Axé music	É o Tchan! – "Gol de Placa"	8	**7**	8	6	5	34
July 12	Rocío G. & Carlos	Axé music	É o Tchan! – "Dança do Bumbum"	10	**7**	7	6	4	34
July 14	Negra & Fernando	Axé music	Tchakabum – "Tesouro de Pirata"	7	**6**	9	6	2	30
July 14	Adabel & Leonardo	Axé music	Terra Samba – "Treme Terra"	7	**9**	10	7	6	39
July 14	Erika & Cristian	Axé music	Matizes – "Latinha de Cerveja"	10	**8**	8	6	6	38
July 14	M. Eugenia & Juan P.	Axé music	É o Tchan! – "Na Boquinha Da Garrafa"	10	**8**	9	6	4	37
July 14	Tony & Sol	Axé music	Harmonía do Samba – "Agachadinho"	10	**5**	8	3	2	28
July 15	Jimena & Facundo	Axé music	Terra Samba – "Reboleia"	10	**9**	10	7	6	42
July 18	Silvina & Vanina	Reggaeton	El Original – "Brújula de amor"	**8**	10	10	10	5	43
July 18	Marcelo & Georgina	Reggaeton	Don Omar – "Conteo"	**10**	10	8	6	4	38
July 18	Negrito & Yanil	Reggaeton	Daddy Yankee featuring Deevani – "Mírame"	**8**	7	5	4	3	27
July 19	Wanda & Pier	Reggaeton	Croni K – "Nadie lo Sabrá"	**9**	10	10	7	6	42
July 19	Coki & Juan Leandro	Reggaeton	Angel & Khriz – "Ven Bailalo"	**10**	9	8	6	3	36
July 19	Mónica F. & Christian	Reggaeton	Wisin & Yandel – "Abusadora"	**9**	9	9	6	6	39
July 19	Eugenia & Franco	Reggaeton	Daddy Yankee featuring Zion & Lennox – "Tu Príncipe"	**9**	9	8	6	5	37
July 21	Peter & Julieta	Reggaeton	Flex featuring Mr. Saik – "Dime Si Te Vas Con Él"	**10**	8	9	7	4	38
July 21	Nicole & Nicolás	Reggaeton	Daddy Yankee – "Descontrol"	**9**	8	8	5	3	33
July 21	Nicolás & Judith	Reggaeton	Daddy Yankee – "Dale Caliente"	**9**	6	8	5	6	34
July 21	Adabel & Leonardo	Reggaeton	Daddy Yankee – "Pose"	**10**	10	10	8	6	44
July 22	Tony & Sol	Reggaeton	Tiburón Valdez – "Hasta Abajo Papi"	**9**	4	5	3	2	23
July 22	Mónica G. & Maxi	Reggaeton	Daddy Yankee – "¿Qué Tengo Que Hacer?"	**9**	8	7	4	4	32
July 22	José M. & Emanuel	Reggaeton	Daddy Yankee – "Rompe"	**9**	10	10	8	8	45
July 25	Tito & Nadia	Reggaeton	Don Omar – "Dile"	**8**	8	10	4	3	33
July 25	Claudia & Juan Pablo	Reggaeton	Wisin & Yandel – "Rakata"	**8**	7	8	5	4	32
July 26	Noelia & Hernán	Reggaeton	Daddy Yankee – "Ella Me Levantó"	**10**	10	8	6	5	39
July 26	Jimena & Facundo	Reggaeton	Ricky Martin featuring Daddy Yankee – "Drop It on Me"	**9**	8	8	6	5	36
July 26	Rocío G. & Carlos	Reggaeton	Héctor & Tito – "Baila Morena"	**9**	7	7	5	3	32
July 28	Denise & Alejandro	Reggaeton	Latin Fresh – "Bata Bata"	**10**	9	10	8	3	40
July 28	Mole & Mariana	Reggaeton	Wisin & Yandel – "Ahora Es"	**8**	8	8	5	4	33
July 28	Larissa & Fernando	Reggaeton	La Factoría – "Yo Soy Tu Gatita"	**6**	5	8	6	7	32
July 29	Paula & Pablo	Reggaeton	Daddy Yankee – "Machucando"	**10**	9	8	6	4	37
July 29	Cinthia & Gabriel	Reggaeton	Daddy Yankee – "Llamado de Emergencia"	**10**	9	7	6	5	37
July 29	Daniel & Ana Laura	Reggaeton	Vico C – "La Vecinita"	**7**	8	6	3	3	27
July 29	Erika & Cristian	Reggaeton	Daddy Yankee – "King Daddy"	**7**	8	10	7	7	39

=== August ===
Argentine cumbia, Pole dance and Latin adagio
Date	Couple	Style	Song	Score					Total
Date	Couple	Style	Song	Graciela	Flavio	Moria	Anibal	Marcelo	Total
August 4	Zaira & Pier	Argentine cumbia	Gilda – "Fuiste"	10	9	8	**5**	5	37
August 4	Manuel & Ana Laura	Argentine cumbia	Los Chakales – "Vete de Mi Lado"	10	6	6	**5**	2	29
August 4	Adabel & Martín	Argentine cumbia	Lía Crucet – "Cumbia Apretadita"	8	8	10	**4**	3	33
August 5	Peter & Julieta	Argentine cumbia	Ráfaga – "Agüita"	7	8	9	**3**	3	30
August 5	Coki & Juan Leandro	Argentine cumbia	Los Palmeras – "Bombón Asesino"	9	9	8	**6**	5	37
August 5	Silvina & Vanina	Argentine cumbia	Ráfaga – "Ritmo Caliente"	10	9	10	**7**	6	42
August 5	Nicolás & Judith	Argentine cumbia	Volcán – "Esa Malvada"	10	9	5	**3**	3	30
August 8	Denise & Alejandro	Argentine cumbia	Ráfaga – "Ráfaga de Amor"	7	7	5	**4**	2	25
August 8	Paula & Pablo	Argentine cumbia	Ráfaga – "Luna Luna"	7	6	9	**5**	3	30
August 8	M. Eugenia & Juan P.	Argentine cumbia	Antonio Ríos – "Nunca Me Faltes"	9	8	9	**7**	5	38
August 8	Eugenia & Franco	Argentine cumbia	Gilda – "No Me Arrepiento de Este Amor"	3	8	8	**4**	2	25
August 8	Marcelo & Georgina	Argentine cumbia	La Nueva Luna – "Iluminará"	8	8	10	**7**	4	37
August 9	Noelia & Hernán	Argentine cumbia	La Cumbia – "Porque te Amo"	10	10	10	**7**	7	44
August 9	Cinthia & Gabriel	Argentine cumbia	Los Charros – "Amores Como El Nuestro"	10	8	9	**6**	4	37
August 9	Larissa & Fernando	Argentine cumbia	Gladys La Bomba Tucumana – "La Pollera Amarilla"	9	8	10	**6**	4	37
August 9	Nicole & Nicolás	Argentine cumbia	El Original – "El Cielo Se Quedó Sin Estrellas"	8	8	7	**4**	2	29
August 11	Rocío G. & Carlos	Argentine cumbia	Ráfaga – "Ritmo de Cumbia"	10	8	10	**7**	5	40
August 11	Erika & Cristian	Argentine cumbia	Sombras – "La Ventanita"	9	5	6	**2**	3	25
August 11	Mónica F. & Christian	Argentine cumbia	Gilda – "Corazón Valiente"	10	8	8	**5**	4	35
August 11	Mole & Mariana	Argentine cumbia	Amar Azul – "Yo Me Enamoré"	8	6	10	**7**	8	39
August 11	Tony & Sol	Argentine cumbia	Red – "Pienso en Ti"	10	7	10	**5**	3	35
August 12	Tito & Nadia	Argentine cumbia	Damas Gratis – "Se Te Ve la Tanga"	8	10	8	**6**	3	35
August 12	Mónica G. & Maxi	Argentine cumbia	Sombras – "Pega La Vuelta"	10	8	8	**6**	4	36
August 12	José M. & Emanuel	Argentine cumbia	Gilda – "Paisaje"	9	9	10	**8**	4	40
August 12	Jimena & Facundo	Argentine cumbia	Ráfaga – "Mentirosa"	10	9	10	**7**	4	40
August 16	Silvina & Vanina	Pole dance	Christina Aguilera – "Fighter"	10	**9**	9	5	4	37
August 16	Peter & Julieta	Pole dance	AC/DC – "Back in Black"	10	**10**	10	6	4	40
August 16	Adabel & Martín	Pole dance	Kris Allen – "Come Together"	8	**10**	7	8	10	43
August 18	Cinthia & Gabriel	Pole dance	Bon Jovi – "You Give Love a Bad Name"	10	**9**	8	9	7	43
August 18	Coki & Juan Leandro	Pole dance	Alannah Myles – "Black Velvet"	9	**7**	7	5	3	31
August 18	Nicolás & Judith	Pole dance	U2 – "Elevation"	10	**9**	10	6	5	40
August 18	Eugenia & Franco	Pole dance	Lenny Kravitz – "Rock and Roll Is Dead"	7	**7**	9	4	3	30
August 19	Denise & Alejandro	Pole dance	Billy Idol – "Mony Mony"	6	**7**	8^{[j3]}	6	7	34
August 19	Mónica F. & Christian	Pole dance	INXS – "Suicide Blonde"	6	**6**	8^{[j3]}	6	5	31
August 19	Mole & Mariana	Pole dance	AC/DC – "You Shook Me All Night Long"	4	**6**	8^{[j3]}	3	2	23
August 22	Paula & Pablo	Pole dance	Poison – "Unskinny Bop"	7	**8**	8^{[j4]}	5	3	31
August 22	Pampita & Carlos	Pole dance	INXS – "New Sensation"	10	**8**	9^{[j4]}	9	6	42
August 22	Marcelo & Goergina	Pole dance	Britney Spears – "(I Can't Get No) Satisfaction"	8	**8**	8^{[j4]}	4	3	31
August 22	M. Eugenia & Juan P.	Pole dance	Aerosmith – "Eat the Rich"	10	**9**	9^{[j4]}	6	5	39
August 23	Noelia & Hernán	Pole dance	Five – "Everybody Get Up"	10	**10**	10^{[j4]}	10	10	50
August 23	Manuel & Ana Laura	Pole dance	Will Smith – "Black Suits Comin' (Nod Ya Head)"	10	**7**	7^{[j4]}	6	5	35
August 23	Jimena & Facundo	Pole dance	Aerosmith – "Love in an Elevator"	10	**7**	7^{[j4]}	5	4	33
August 25	Zaira & Pier	Pole dance	Aerosmith – "Cryin'"	8	**9**	7	5	3	32
August 25	Belén & Maxi	Pole dance	Guns N' Roses – "Welcome to the Jungle"	10	**8**	9	3	2	32
August 25	Erika & Cristian	Pole dance	Lenny Kravitz – "Always on the Run"	9	**8**	8	6	5	36
August 25	José M. & Emanuel	Pole dance	Lady Gaga – "Judas"	9	**8**	10	6	4	37
August 26	Turco & Nadia	Pole dance	Warrant – "Cherry Pie"	9	**8**	10	5	5	37
August 26	Larissa & Fernando	Pole dance	Bon Jovi – "Livin' on a Prayer"	10	**6**	8	6	3	33
August 26	Tony & Sol	Pole dance	Frankie Goes to Hollywood – "Relax"	10	**8**	10	7	5	40
August 30	Peter & Julieta	Latin adagio	Luis Miguel – "Entrégate"	9	6	**7**	5	3	30
August 30	Cinthia & Gabriel	Latin adagio	Luis Miguel – "La Incondicional"	9	9	**9**	7	6	40
August 30	Adabel & Martín	Latin adagio	Ricky Martin – "Tal Vez"	10	9	**9**	8	4	40

=== September ===
Latin adagio, Cuarteto and Disco
Date	Couple	Style	Song	Score					Total
Date	Couple	Style	Song	Graciela	Flavio	Moria	Anibal	Marcelo	Total
September 1	Denise & Alejandro	Latin adagio	Ricardo Montaner – "Tan Enamorados"	7	9	**7**	4	3	30
September 1	Marcelo & Georgina	Latin adagio	David Bisbal – "Dígale"	9	6	**8**	5	3	31
September 1	Larissa & Fernando	Latin adagio	Ricky Martin – "A Medio Vivir"	10	7	**6**	4	3	30
September 1	Mónica F. & Christian	Latin adagio	Cristian Castro – "Por Amarte Así"	8	6	**8**	6	4	32
September 2	Tony & Sol	Latin adagio	Sergio Dalma – "Bailar pegados"	10	6	**5**	4	2	27
September 2	Eugenia & Franco	Latin adagio	Luis Miguel – "Ayer"	10	9	**9**	6	6	40
September 2	Erika & Cristian	Latin adagio	Cristian Castro – "Nunca Voy a Olvidarte"	8	7	**5**	4	3	27
September 2	José M. & Emanuel	Latin adagio	Ricky Martin – "Vuelve"	8	5	**5**	3	3	24
September 5	Tito & Nadia	Latin adagio	Chayanne – "Un Siglo Sin Ti"	7	8	**8**	4	3	30
September 5	Zaira & Pier	Latin adagio	Ricardo Montaner – "Me Va a Extrañar"	9	9	**10**	6	5	39
September 5	Coki & Juan Leandro	Latin adagio	Ricardo Montaner – "Será"	8	7	**7**	5	3	30
September 6	Paula & Pablo	Latin adagio	Ricardo Montaner – "Castillo Azul"	10	10	**10**	7	3	40
September 6	Waldo & Vanina	Latin adagio	Ricky Martin – "Fuego de Noche, Nieve de Día"	10	10	**10**	6	5	41
September 6	Pampita & Carlos	Latin adagio	Franco De Vita featuring Alejandra Guzmán – "Tan Sólo Tú"	9	10	**8**	5	4	36
September 6	M. Eugenia & Nicolás	Latin adagio	Ricardo Montaner – "Déjame Llorar"	10	9	**9**	7	3	38
September 8	Noelia & Hernán	Latin adagio	Chayanne – "Dejaría Todo"	10	10	**5**	5	3	33
September 8	Belén & Maxi	Latin adagio	Ricky Martin – "Te Extraño, Te Olvido, Te Amo"	7	8	**6**	4	2	27
September 8	Nicolás & Judith	Latin adagio	Teen Angels – "Cambiar de Aire"	7	8	**7**	6	3	31
September 8	Daniel & Ana Laura	Latin adagio	Chayanne – "Atado a Tu Amor"	6	7	**9**	3	2	27
September 8	Jimena & Facundo	Latin adagio	Alejandro Sanz – "Y, ¿Si Fuera Ella?"	10	8	**7**	4	3	32
September 12	Peter & Julieta	Cuarteto	Los Reyes del Cuarteto – "Apareciste Tú"	**7**	10	10	7	4	38
September 12	Zaira & Pier	Cuarteto	Rodrigo – "Que Ironía"	**7**	8	7	4	3	29
September 12	Adabel & Martín	Cuarteto	Walter Olmos – "Adicto a Ti"	**8**	9	9	6	4	36
September 13	Tito & Nadia	Cuarteto	Jean Carlos – "Entre la Noche y el Día"	**8**	6	6	2	2	24
September 13	Cinthia & Gabriel	Cuarteto	Walter Olmos – "No Me Mientas"	**8**	10	10	5	5	38
September 13	Eugenia & Franco	Cuarteto	Rodrigo – "Amor de Alquiler"	**9**	8	7	3	1	28
September 13	Marcelo & Georgina	Cuarteto	Rodrigo – "Cómo le Digo"	**10**	9	6	5	6	36
September 16	Paula & Pablo	Cuarteto	Jean Carlos – "Quiereme"	**9**	10	8	6	5	38
September 16	Coki & Juan Leandro	Cuarteto	Rodrigo – "Soy Cordobés"	**10**	7	7	4	3	31
September 16	Mónica F. & Christian	Cuarteto	Rodrigo – "Amor Clasificado"	**10**	7	7	6	4	34
September 16	M. Eugenia & Juan P.	Cuarteto	Jean Carlos – "Pero Me Acuerdo de Ti"	**6**	7	5	3	3	24
September 17	Noelia & Hernán	Cuarteto	La Barra – "Gotas de Pena"	**10**	10	8	6	6	40
September 17	Waldo & Vanina	Cuarteto	La Mona Jiménez – "Boom Boom"	**10**	10	10	7	6	43
September 17	Belén & Maxi	Cuarteto	Rodrigo – "Ocho Cuarenta"	**7**	8	8	5	3	31
September 17	Erika & Cristian	Cuarteto	Banda XXI – "El Bombón"	**5**	6	6	4	3	24
September 17	Nicolás & Judith	Cuarteto	Rodrigo – "Cómo Olvidarla"	**5**	7	6	3	3	24
September 19	Denise & Alejandro	Cuarteto	La Mona Jiménez – "Beso A Beso"	**4**	5	4	3	1	17
September 19	Evangelina & Carlos	Cuarteto	Rodrigo – "Lo Mejor del Amor"	**9**	8	9	5	4	35
September 19	Larissa & Fernando	Cuarteto	Rodrigo – "Fuego y Pasión"	**8**	10	10	7	5	40
September 19	Jimena & Facundo	Cuarteto	Walter Olmos – "Por Lo Que Yo Te Quiero"	**8**	10	10	6	6	40
September 20	Tony & Sol	Cuarteto	Banda XXI – "De Reversa"	**9**	7	8	4	3	31
September 22	Peter & Julieta	Disco	Mika – "Love Today"	10	10	10	**6**	6	42
September 22	Zaira & Pier	Disco	Earth, Wind & Fire – "Boogie Wonderland"	10	8	7	**4**	3	32
September 22	Eugenia & Franco	Disco	Earth, Wind & Fire – "September"	10	7	7	**5**	2	31
September 22	Adabel & Martín	Disco	Jamiroquai – "Canned Heat"	10	9	10	**7**	7	43
September 23	Tito & Nadia	Disco	Village People – "YMCA"	10	5	4	**3**	2	24
September 23	Larissa & Fernando	Disco	Village People – "Can't Stop the Music"	9	6	7	**4**	3	29
September 23	Mónica F. & Christian	Disco	Sylvester – "You Make Me Feel (Mighty Real)"	10	6	8	**5**	5	34
September 26	Evangelina & Carlos	Disco	Patrick Hernandez – "Born to be Alive"	10	9	9	**6**	5	39
September 26	Silvina & Vanina	Disco	Pussycat Dolls – "Hush Hush"	8	8	7	**5**	4	32
September 26	Coki & Juan Leandro	Disco	Cher – "Strong Enough"	8	7	7	**4**	3	29
September 26	Erika & Cristian	Disco	ABBA – "Voulez-Vous"	9	8	7	**4**	3	31
September 27	Paula & Pablo	Disco	Gloria Gaynor – "Never Can Say Goodbye"	10	9	10	**6**	6	41
September 27	M. Eugenia & Juan P.	Disco	Donna Summer – "Last Dance"	9^{[j1]}	8	8	**6**	5	36
September 27	Cinthia & Gabriel	Disco	Madonna – "Hung Up"	10^{[j1]}	10	10	**8**	7	45
September 29	Noelia & Hernán	Disco	Donna Summer – "On the Radio"	10	10	10	**8**	6	44
September 29	Marcelo & Georgina	Disco	Bee Gees – "You Should Be Dancing"	10	10	9	**7**	6	42
September 29	Belén & Maxi	Disco	Laura Branigan – "Gloria"	9	10	9	**6**	3	37
September 29	Tony & Sol	Disco	Donna Summer – "Hot Stuff"	10	9	10	**5**	3	37
September 30	Virginia & Alejandro	Disco	Macy Gray – "Sexual Revolution"	10	9	9	**6**	6	40
September 30	Jimena & Facundo	Disco	Tina Turner – "Disco Inferno"	10	10	10	**8**	7	45

=== October ===
Strip dance, Electro dance and Merengue
Date	Couple	Style	Song	Score					Total
Date	Couple	Style	Song	Graciela	Flavio	Moria	Anibal	Marcelo	Total
October 3	Peter & Julieta	Strip dance	Alicia Keys – "Fallin'"	8	7	**7**	4	3	29
October 3	Cinthia & Gabriel	Strip dance	Beyoncé – "Beautiful Liar"	9	9	**10**	7	3	38
October 3	Zaira & Pier	Strip dance	Joe Cocker – "You Can Leave Your Hat On"	9	7	**7**	4	7	34
October 3	Mónica F. & Christian	Strip dance	B.B. King and Joe Cocker – "Dangerous Mood"	10	10	**10**	7	7	44
October 4	Paula & Pablo	Strip dance	Joan Jett – "I Love Rock 'n' Roll"	10	10	**9**	6	4	39
October 4	Adabel & Martín	Strip dance	Tom Jones – "Kiss"	10	9	**8**	6	5	38
October 4	Larissa & Fernando	Strip dance	Aerosmith – "Rag Doll"	10	7	**7**	6	4	34
October 6	Coki & Juan Leandro	Strip dance	Aerosmith – "Cryin'"	10	9	**9**	6	5	39
October 6	Evangelina & Carlos	Strip dance	Guns N' Roses – "November Rain"	8	8	**6**	4	3	29
October 6	Eugenia & Leonardo	Strip dance	Pussycat Dolls – "Buttons"	10	9	**9**	7	5	40
October 6	Tony & Sol	Strip dance	Prince – "Purple Rain"	6	8	**8**	4	3	29
October 7	Marcela & Hernán	Strip dance	Guns N' Roses – "Live and Let Die"	10	10	**10**	5	6	41
October 7	Virginia & Alejandro	Strip dance	Lenny Kravitz – "American Woman"	9	8	**7**	5	5	34
October 7	Jimena & Facundo	Strip dance	Guns N' Roses – "Since I Don't Have You"	9	9	**7**	5	4	34
October 7	Mónica G. & Maxi	Strip dance	Beyoncé – "Naughty Girl"	10	8	**7**	5	3	33
October 10	Tito & Nadia	Strip dance	Aerosmith – "Pink"	8	10	**10**	4	4	36
October 10	M. Eugenia & Juan P.	Strip dance	Peggy Lee – "Why Don't You Do Right?"	10	10	**10**	6	6	42
October 10	Silvina & Sofía	Strip dance	Bon Jovi – "It's My Life"	8	9	**10**	7	3	37
October 10	Marcelo & Georgina	Strip dance	Aerosmith – "Crazy"	7	8	**9**	6	3	33
October 14	Denise & Alejandro	Electro dance	Taio Cruz – "Dynamite"	9^{[j5]}	**8**	6	3	2	28
October 14	Adabel & Martín	Electro dance	David Guetta featuring Flo Rida and Nicki Minaj – "Where Them Girls At"	10^{[j5]}	**9**	10	5	3	37
October 14	Eugenia & Leonardo	Electro dance	David Guetta featuring Akon – "Sexy Bitch"	8^{[j5]}	**7**	8	4	7	34
October 14	Mónica F. & Christian	Electro dance	David Guetta featuring Estelle – "One Love"	7^{[j5]}	**7**	7	4	3	28
October 17	Noelia & Hernán	Electro dance	David Guetta and Chris Willis featuring Fergie and LMFAO – "Gettin' Over You"	10^{[j5]}	**8**	8	5	3	34
October 17	Peter & Julieta	Electro dance	The Black Eyed Peas – "The Time (Dirty Bit)"	8^{[j5]}	**7**	9	6	4	34
October 17	Coki & Juan Leandro	Electro dance	LMFAO – "Party Rock Anthem"	10^{[j5]}	**10**	10	7	7	44
October 17	Jimena & Facundo	Electro dance	Katy Perry – "Hot n Cold"	9^{[j5]}	**9**	10	6	5	39
October 18	Paula & Pablo	Electro dance	David Guetta featuring Kelly Rowland – "When Love Takes Over"	8^{[j5]}	**7**	7	4	4	30
October 18	Zaira & Pier	Electro dance	Rihanna – "S&M"	8^{[j5]}	**6**	7	4	7	32
October 18	Cinthia & Gabriel	Electro dance	David Guetta featuring Flo Rida – "Club Can't Handle Me"	10^{[j5]}	**9**	8	4	4	35
October 18	M. Eugenia & Nicolás	Electro dance	Katy Perry – "Firework"	9^{[j5]}	**8**	8	4	4	33
October 20	Tito & Nadia	Electro dance	The Black Eyed Peas – "I Gotta Feeling"	2^{[j5]}	**6**	7	3	1	19
October 20	Silvina & Sofía	Electro dance	Lady Gaga – "Born This Way"	5^{[j5]}	**5**	5	6	2	23
October 20	Larissa & Fernando	Electro dance	David Guetta featuring Taio Cruz and Ludacris – "Little Bad Girl"	4^{[j5]}	**4**	8	5	2	23
October 20	Tony & Sol	Electro dance	Duck Sauce – "Barbra Streisand"	2^{[j5]}	**6**	10	3	2	23
October 21	Mónica G. & Maxi	Electro dance	Martin Solveig – "Hello"	8^{[j5]}	**5**	8	6	5	32
October 24	Peter & Julieta	Merengue	Juan Luis Guerra 440 – "La Bilirrubina"	**5**^{[j5]}	7	6	4	3	25
October 24	Mónica G. & Maxi	Merengue	Manny Manuel – "Se Me Sube"	**8**^{[j5]}	7	7	4	4	30
October 24	Coki & Juan Leandro	Merengue	Oro Sólido – "Moviendo las Caderas"	**10**^{[j5]}	9	9	6	5	39
October 24	Cinthia & Gabriel	Merengue	Elvis Crespo – "Tu Sonrisa"	**10**^{[j5]}	10	10	8	7	45
October 25	Tito & Nadia	Merengue	La Banda Sólida – "Por Amarte Así"	**9**^{[j5]}	9	8	4	6	36
October 25	Paula & Pablo	Merengue	Olga Tañón – "Es Mentiroso"	**9**^{[j5]}	10	10	7	7	43
October 25	Zaira & Pier	Merengue	R.K.M & Ken-Y – "Te Regalo Amores"	**5**^{[j5]}	7	7	4	4	27
October 25	Adabel & Martín	Merengue	La Rhumba – "Muévelo"	**10**^{[j5]}	10	10	7	5	42
October 27	Noelia & Hernán	Merengue	Wilfrido Vargas – "Abusadora"	**4**^{[j5]}	9	7	5	5	30
October 27	Larissa & Fernando	Merengue	La Barra – "Eres Tú"	**6**^{[j5]}	6	7	5	3	27
October 27	M. Eugenia & Nicolás	Merengue	Chino & Nacho – "Mi Niña Bonita"	**5**^{[j5]}	7	7	5	3	27
October 27	Mónica F. & Christian	Merengue	Cristian Castro – "Azul"	**10**^{[j5]}	9	9	6	3	37
October 28	Denise & Alejandro	Merengue	Carlos Manuel – "Esa Chica Tiene Swing"	**6**^{[j5]}	8	8	5	3	30
October 28	Silvina & Sofía	Merengue	Juan Luis Guerra 440 – "A Pedir Su Mano"	**10**^{[j5]}	9	10	7	7	43
October 28	Jimena & Facundo	Merengue	Manny Manuel – "Corazon Partio"	**9**^{[j5]}	9	10	7	6	41
October 28	Eugenia & Leonardo	Merengue	Sergio Vargas – "La Ventanita"	**10**^{[j5]}	8	7	5	2	32

=== November ===
Music video, Aquadance, Arabic music, Dancing in the rain and Adagio from telenovelas
Date	Couple	Style	Song	Score					Total
Date	Couple	Style	Song	Carmen	Flavio	Moria	Anibal	Marcelo	Total
November 1	Coki & Juan Leandro	Music video	Rihanna – "Don't Stop the Music"	7	7	6	**3**	3	26
November 1	Silvina & Sofía	Music video	Lady Gaga featuring Beyoncé – "Telephone"	10	5	9	**6**	3	33
November 1	Cinthia & Gabriel	Music video	Lady Gaga – "Born This Way"	8	3	8	**6**	3	28
November 1	Eugenia & Leonardo	Music video	Shakira featuring Wyclef Jean – "Hips Don't Lie"	6	7	7	**4**	2	26
November 3	Peter & Julieta	Music video	The Black Eyed Peas – "Pump It"	10	8	10	**6**	4	38
November 3	Zaira & Pier	Music video	Rihanna – "Only Girl (In the World)"	5	6	7	**5**	3	26
November 3	Adabel & Martín	Music video	Lady Gaga – "Judas"	8	10	8	**7**	7	40
November 3	Mónica F. & Christian	Music video	Britney Spears – "Till the World Ends"	6	6	7	**4**	3	26
November 4	Tito & Nadia	Music video	Michael Jackson – "They Don't Care About Us"	10	8	10	**5**	5	38
November 4	Paula & Pablo	Music video	Katy Perry – "I Kissed a Girl"	10	9	10	**6**	5	40
November 4	Denise & Alejandro	Music video	Lady Gaga – "Bad Romance"	6	3	7	**6**	1	23
November 4	M. Eugenia & Nicolás	Music video	Britney Spears featuring Madonna – "Me Against the Music"	10	8	10	**5**	3	36
November 4	Jimena & Facundo	Music video	Beyoncé – "Run the World (Girls)"	7	8	10	**3**	3	31
November 7	Noelia & Hernán	Music video	Shakira featuring El Cata – "Loca"	10	7	5	**6**	7	35
November 7	Larissa & Fernando	Music video	Kylie Minogue – "Can't Get You Out of My Head"	8	6	9	**6**	6	35
November 8	M. Eugenia & Nicolás	Aquadance	Evanescence – "My Immortal"	10	10	**8**	6	5	39
November 8	Cinthia & Gabriel	Aquadance	Evanescence – "Bring Me to Life"	10	10	**10**	8	10	48
November 8	Larissa & Fernando	Aquadance	Aerosmith – "Amazing"	7	8	**8**	5	3	31
November 10	Peter & Julieta	Aquadance	Soda Stereo – "Corazón Delator"	10	8	**10**	7	6	41
November 10	Coki & Juan Leandro	Aquadance	Duran Duran – "Ordinary World"	10	8	**10**	5	3	36
November 10	Adabel & Martín	Aquadance	David Cook – "I Don't Want to Miss a Thing"	9	7	**7**	6	5	34
November 10	Jimena & Facundo	Aquadance	U2 featuring Mary J. Blige – "One"	7	8	**7**	6	3	31
November 11	Tito & Nadia	Aquadance	Guns N' Roses – "Don't Cry"	7	8	**7**	6	6	34
November 11	Paula & Pablo	Aquadance	Boyce Avenue featuring Kina Grannis – "With or Without You"	10	10	**10**	7	5	42
November 11	Virginia & Alejandro	Aquadance	Sting – "Desert Rose"	10	10	**8**	5	6	39
November 11	Eugenia & Franco	Aquadance	Queen – "Bohemian Rhapsody"	8	8	**7**	5	3	31
November 14	Noelia & Hernán	Aquadance	Depeche Mode – "Enjoy the Silence"	8	9	**5**	5	4	31
November 14	Zaira & Pier	Aquadance	Michael Bolton – "How Am I Supposed to Live Without You"	5	7	**4**	4	3	23
November 14	Silvina & Sofía	Aquadance	Queen – "The Show Must Go On"	9	7	**8**	6	4	34
November 17	Peter & Julieta	Arabic music	Mohamed Fouad – "Yalla Hawa"	7	**6**	7	4	4	28
November 17	Coki & Juan Leandro	Arabic music	Tarkan – "Şımarık"	6	**9**	6	4	3	28
November 17	Larissa & Fernando	Arabic music	Ehab Tawfik – "Allah Aleik Ya Sidi"	8	**9**	9	6	5	37
November 18	Tito & Nadia	Arabic music	Tarkan – "Ölürüm Sana"	5	**5**	8	5	5	28
November 18	Paula & Pablo	Arabic music	Hani Al Omari – "Molfet Lel Nazar"	10	**10**	10	7	7	44
November 18	Cinthia & Gabriel	Arabic music	Hakim – "Wala Wahed"	9	**9**	8	6	4	36
November 18	Denise & Alejandro	Arabic music	Ali Mohammed – "Raks Bedeya"	10	**8**	8	5	3	34
November 21	Noelia & Hernán	Arabic music	Hakim – "Ehdarun"	9	**9**	8	6	5	37
November 21	Silvina & Sofía	Arabic music	Diaa – "El Leilah"	7	**6**	6	5	4	28
November 21	M. Eugenia & Nicolás	Arabic music	Marcus Viana – "Maktub II"	4	**5**	5	3	3	20
November 21	Adabel & Martín	Arabic music	Amir Sofi – "Isis"	10	**8**	7	5	4	34
November 22	Eugenia & Leonardo	Arabic music	Hakim – "Ah Ya Albi"	10	**8**	10	5	4	37
November 24	Peter & Julieta	Dancing in the rain	Macy Gray – "Sexual Revolution"	**6**	4	8	5	3	26
November 24	Coki & Juan Leandro	Dancing in the rain	Robbie Williams – "Angels"	**5**	8	6	4	3	26
November 24	Larissa & Fernando	Dancing in the rain	Chayanne – "Caprichosa"	**7**	7	8	4	4	30
November 24	Cinthia & Gabriel	Dancing in the rain	Justin Bieber featuring Ludacris – "Baby"	**9**	6	9	5	4	33
November 25	Tito & Nadia	Dancing in the rain	Aerosmith – "Rag Doll"	**9**	7	7	6	5	34
November 25	Paula & Pablo	Dancing in the rain	Katy Perry – "Hot n Cold"	**10**	7	8	5	4	34
November 25	Noelia & Hernán	Dancing in the rain	Glee – "Total Eclipse of the Heart"	**10**	10	10	8	7	45
November 25	Eugenia & Leandro	Dancing in the rain	David Bisbal – "Ave María"	**7**	6	8	5	4	30
November 25	Adabel & Martín	Dancing in the rain	Pussycat Dolls – "Hush Hush"	**6**	6	6	4	4	26
November 28	Silvina & Sofía	Dancing in the rain	Ricky Martin – "Tal Vez"	**10**	8	7	6	3	34
November 29	Noelia & Hernán	Adagio from telenovelas	Franco De Vita featuring Alejandra Guzmán – "Tan Sólo Tú" (from Los únicos)	10	8	8	**5**	4	35
November 29	Peter & Julieta	Adagio from telenovelas	Ricardo Montaner – "El Poder de Tú Amor" (from Calypso)	6	8	8	**5**	6	33
November 29	Coki & Juan Leandro	Adagio from telenovelas	Ricardo Montaner – "Volver" (from Valientes)	10	7	8	**5**	3	33
November 29	Larissa & Fernando	Adagio from telenovelas	Valeria Lynch – "Esa Extraña Dama" (from La Extraña Dama)	6	6	5	**3**	2	22

=== December ===
Adagio from telenovelas, Tribute to Gilda and Rodrigo, Rotating room, Music from movies and Salsa
Date	Couple	Style	Song	Score					Total
Date	Couple	Style	Song	Carmen	Flavio	Moria	Anibal	Marcelo	Total
December 1	Tito & Nadia	Adagio from telenovelas	Paz Martínez – "Una Lágrima Sobre el Teléfono" (from Una Voz en el Teléfono)	7	8	7	**3**	3	28
December 1	Paula & Pablo	Adagio from telenovelas	Valeria Lynch – "Ámame en Cámara Lenta" (from Ese Hombre Prohibido)	9	8	7	**6**	5	35
December 1	Cinthia & Gabriel	Adagio from telenovelas	David Bisbal – "Herederos" (from Herederos de una venganza)	10	10	10	**7**	6	43
December 1	Adabel & Martín	Adagio from telenovelas	Ricardo Montaner – "Bésame la Boca" (from Al diablo con los guapos)	10	10	9	**6**	5	40
December 2	Silvina & Sofía	Adagio from telenovelas	Paz Martínez – "¿Y Qué?" (from Padre Coraje)	7	6	6	**5**	4	28
December 5	Peter & Julieta	Tribute to Gilda and Rodrigo	Rodrigo – "Soy Cordobés"	7	7	**7**	6	7	34
December 5	Coki & Juan Leandro	Tribute to Gilda and Rodrigo	Gilda – "No Me Arrepiento de Este Amor"	8	8	**7**	5	6	34
December 5	Silvina & Sofía	Tribute to Gilda and Rodrigo	Rodrigo – "Cómo Olvidarla"	9	9	**10**	7	5	40
December 5	Cinthia & Gabriel	Tribute to Gilda and Rodrigo	Rodrigo – "Cómo le Digo"	10	9	**9**	7	6	41
December 6	Tito & Nadia	Tribute to Gilda and Rodrigo	Rodrigo – "Fue lo Mejor del Amor"	6	7	**5**	5	5	28
December 6	Paula & Pablo	Tribute to Gilda and Rodrigo	Gilda – "Paisaje"	8	9	**5**	6	6	34
December 6	Noelia & Hernán	Tribute to Gilda and Rodrigo	Rodrigo – "Qué Ironía"	10	7	**7**	5	5	34
December 6	Adabel & Martín	Tribute to Gilda and Rodrigo	Gilda – "Fuiste"	6	7	**5**	5	5	28
December 9	Paula & Pablo	Rotating room	The Black Eyed Peas – "Let's Get It Started"	10^{[j6]}	**8**	9	6	7	40
December 9	Peter & Julieta	Rotating room	'N Sync – "Pop"	10^{[j6]}	**8**	8	6	8	40
December 9	Coki & Juan Leandro	Rotating room	Joss Stone – "You Had Me"	10^{[j6]}	**9**	8	5	7	39
December 9	Silvina & Sofía	Rotating room	Amy Winehouse – "Rehab"	8^{[j6]}	**8**	6	6	4	32
December 9	Cinthia & Gabriel	Rotating room	Britney Spears – "...Baby One More Time"	8^{[j6]}	**9**	8	5	4	34
December 12	Tito & Nadia	Rotating room	Madonna – "Don't Tell Me"	10^{[j6]}	**8**	10	6	7	41
December 12	Noelia & Hernán	Rotating room	Björk – "It's Oh So Quiet"	10^{[j6]}	**10**	7	5	7	39
December 13	Paula & Pablo	Music from movies	Christina Aguilera, Pink, Lil' Kim and Mýa – "Lady Marmalade" (from Moulin Rouge!)	**7**^{[j6]}	7	7	5	7	33
December 13	Noelia & Hernán	Music from movies	John Travolta and Olivia Newton-John – "You're the One That I Want" (from Grease)	**9**^{[j6]}	8	6	5	5	33
December 13	Coki & Juan Leandro	Music from movies	Whitney Houston – "I Will Always Love You" (from The Bodyguard)	**10**^{[j6]}	9	10	7	7	43
December 13	Peter & Julieta	Music from movies	Kenny Loggins – "Footloose" (from Footloose)	**10**^{[j6]}	10	10	8	8	46
December 15	Tito & Nadia	Music from movies	Bill Medley and Jennifer Warnes – "(I've Had) The Time of My Life" (from Dirty Dancing)	**7**^{[j6]}	8	10	5	5	35
December 15	Cinthia & Gabriel	Music from movies	Jerry Lee Lewis – "Great Balls of Fire" (from Great Balls of Fire!)	**10**^{[j6]}	10	7	6	5	38

==== Duel ====
Duel
Date	Couple	Style	Song
December 16	Paula & Pablo	Salsa	Dark Latin Groove – "Acuyuyé"
December 16	Tito & Nadia	Salsa	Dark Latin Groove – "Juliana"
December 16	Coki & Juan Leandro	Salsa	Sonora Carruseles – "La Salsa Llegó"
December 16	Peter & Julieta	Salsa	Gloria Estefan – "Mi Tierra"
December 16	Noelia & Hernán	Salsa	Dark Latin Groove – "Magdalena, Mi Amor (Quimbara)"

==== Semifinal and Final ====
Semifinal and Final
Date	Couple	Style	Song	Points					
Date	Couple	Style	Song	Carmen	Flavio	Anibal	Moria	Marcelo	Result
1st Semifinal (December 19)	Noelia & Hernán	Argentine cumbia	La Cumbia – "Porque te Amo"	1	1	1	1	1	**1**
1st Semifinal (December 19)	Coki & Juan Leandro	Argentine cumbia	Los Palmeras – "Bombón Asesino"	–	–	–	–	–	–
1st Semifinal (December 19)	Noelia & Hernán	Latin adagio	Chayanne – "Dejaría Todo"	1	1	–	–	–	–
1st Semifinal (December 19)	Coki & Juan Leandro	Latin adagio	Ricardo Montaner – "Será"	–	–	1	1	1	**1**
1st Semifinal (December 19)	Noelia & Hernán	Cha-cha-cha	Celia Cruz – "Ríe y Llora"	–	–	1	–	1	–
1st Semifinal (December 19)	Coki & Juan Leandro	Cha-cha-cha	Celia Cruz – "Oye Como Va"	1	1	–	1	–	**1**
1st Semifinal (December 19)	Noelia & Hernán	Arabic music	Hakim – "Ehdarun"	1	1	1	1	1	**1**
1st Semifinal (December 19)	Coki & Juan Leandro	Arabic music	Tarkan – "Şımarık"	–	–	–	–	–	–
2nd Semifinal (December 20)	Paula & Pablo	Cuarteto	Jean Carlos – "Quiereme"	1	–	–	1	–	–
2nd Semifinal (December 20)	Tito & Nadia	Cuarteto	Jean Carlos – "Entre la Noche y el Día"	–	1	1	–	1	**1**
2nd Semifinal (December 20)	Paula & Pablo	Adagio from Telenovelas	Valeria Lynch – "Ámame en Cámara Lenta" (from Ese Hombre Prohibido)	–	1	–	1	1	**1**
2nd Semifinal (December 20)	Tito & Nadia	Adagio from Telenovelas	Paz Martínez – "Una Lágrima Sobre el Teléfono" (from Una Voz en el Teléfono)	1	–	1	–	–	–
2nd Semifinal (December 20)	Paula & Pablo	Disco	Gloria Gaynor – "Never Can Say Goodbye"	–	–	–	–	1	–
2nd Semifinal (December 20)	Tito & Nadia	Disco	Village People – "YMCA"	1	1	1	1	–	**1**
2nd Semifinal (December 20)	Paula & Pablo	Axé music	É o Tchan! – "Flinstchan"	–	–	–	1	1	–
2nd Semifinal (December 20)	Tito & Nadia	Axé music	Grupo Cafuné – "Dança do Maluquinho"	1	1	1	–	–	**1**
Final (December 22)	Noelia & Hernán	Reggaeton	Daddy Yankee – "Ella Me Levantó"	–	–	1	1	1	**1**
Final (December 22)	Tito & Nadia	Reggaeton	Don Omar – "Dile"	1	1	–	–	–	–
Final (December 22)	Noelia & Hernán	Adagio	Jessica Simpson – "Take My Breath Away"	1	1	1	1	1	**1**
Final (December 22)	Tito & Nadia	Adagio	Bobby Hatfield – "Unchained Melody"	–	–	–	–	–	–
Final (December 22)	Noelia & Hernán	Latin pop	Chayanne – "Ay Mamá"	–	–	–	–	–	–
Final (December 22)	Tito & Nadia	Latin pop	Chayanne – "Salomé"	1	1	1	1	1	**1**
Final (December 22)	Noelia & Hernán	Electro dance	David Guetta and Chris Willis featuring Fergie and LMFAO – "Gettin' Over You"	–	1	–	1	1	**1**
Final (December 22)	Tito & Nadia	Electro dance	The Black Eyed Peas – "I Gotta Feeling"	1	–	1	–	–	–

- **^[j1]** replaced by Hugo Ávila.
- **^[j2]** replaced by Marcelo Polino.
- **^[j3]** replaced by Laura Fidalgo.
- **^[j4]** replaced by Reina Reech.
- **^[j5]** replaced by Carmen Barbieri.
- **^[j6]** replaced by Graciela Alfano.
