= Nueva Italia =

Nueva Italia (English: New Italy) is the name of towns in the following countries;

Mexico

- Nueva Italia, Michoacán

Paraguay

- Nueva Italia, Paraguay
