= Raúl Saavedra =

Raúl Saavedra may refer to:

- Raúl Saavedra (footballer)
- Raúl Saavedra (cyclist)
