= José Saturnino Cardozo =

Paraguayan footballer and manager (born 1971)

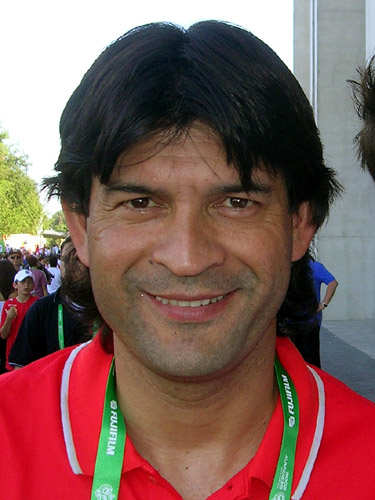
- Cardozo in 2006

Personal information
- Full name: José Saturnino Cardozo Otazú
- Date of birth: 19 March 1971 (age 55)
- Place of birth: Nueva Italia, Paraguay
- Height: 1.83 m (6 ft 0 in)
- Position: Striker

Team information
- Current team: Municipal Liberia (Manager)

Youth career
- 1986–1987: Unión Pacífico

Senior career*
Years	Team	Apps	(Gls)
1988–1990	River Plate Asunción	26	(10)
1990–1992	St. Gallen	31	(12)
1992–1993	Universidad Católica	35	(12)
1994–1995	Olimpia	41	(27)
1995–2005	Toluca	332	(249)
2001	→ Cruz Azul (loan)	0	(0)
2005	→ Pachuca (loan)	0	(0)
2005–2006	San Lorenzo	23	(5)
Total		488	(315)

International career
1992–1995	Paraguay U23	12	(7)
1991–2006	Paraguay	82	(25)

Managerial career
- 2006–2007: Olimpia
- 2009: Indios (assistant)
- 2009–2011: Olimpia
- 2011–2012: Querétaro
- 2012: Olimpia
- 2013: Sportivo Luqueño
- 2013–2016: Toluca
- 2016: Chiapas
- 2017: Puebla
- 2017: Veracruz
- 2018–2019: Guadalajara
- 2021–2023: Municipal
- 2025–: Municipal Liberia
Medal record
Representing Paraguay
Men's Football
Silver medal – second place	2004 Athens	Team competition
- * Club domestic league appearances and goals

José Saturnino Cardozo Otazú (locally [xoˈse satuɾˈnino kaɾˈðoso otaˈsu]; born 19 March 1971) is a Paraguayan football manager and former footballer who played as a striker. He is the current manager of Municipal Liberia.

Known for his prolific scoring ability, Cardozo spent the majority of his career with Toluca FC in Mexico, where he remains the club’s all-time leading scorer. He ranks as the fourth-highest scorer in the history of Mexico’s top division and is widely regarded as one of the greatest foreign players to ever compete in the league. Cardozo was a central figure in one of Toluca's dominant eras from 1998 to 2002, a period in which the club captured four league championships.

Cardozo was awarded Paraguayan Footballer of the Year in 2000, 2002, and 2003. He was recognized by the IFFHS as the world's top top-division goalscorer in 2003 after scoring 58 league goals for Toluca. On the international stage, Cardozo made 82 appearances for Paraguay over a fifteen-year period, scoring 25 goals to become the country's second-highest scorer. He represented the national team in three Copa América tournaments, two FIFA World Cups and the 2004 Summer Olympics, where he won a silver medal.

== Early life ==
José Saturnino Cardozo Otazú was born on 19 March 1971 in Nueva Italia, Central Department, Paraguay, as the eighth of ten siblings. His father, Juan, worked at a refinery and was often absent for long periods to financially support the large family, while his mother, Constanza, managed the household. From an early age, Cardozo expressed a desire to become a professional football player. His mother recalled that he spent most of his time after school playing football, often brought a ball to class, and occasionally skipped school to play.

At twelve years old, Cardozo tried out for Unión Pacífico, a youth club. When asked about his position, he said he played as a "10," the traditional playmaker role associated with creativity and passing. However, he was assigned the position of "9," the classic striker or center forward, responsible for scoring goals—a role he would maintain throughout his professional career. On 27 March 1985, at the age of fourteen, he began playing regularly for Unión Pacífico.

== Club career ==
=== Early career: 1988–1995 ===
Cardozo began his professional career in 1988, making his debut for Paraguay's River Plate Asunción, where he scored 10 goals in 26 appearances. In 1990, he joined the Swiss club FC St. Gallen, his first international experience, where he played until 1992 and scored 12 goals in 30 appearances. He returned to South America in 1993, joining Chile's Club Deportivo Universidad Católica, where he scored 11 goals in 35 appearances. During his time with the club, he competed in the 1992 edition of the Copa Libertadores, where he scored one goal against Chile's Coquimbo Unido in group stage where his team won 5–1. Universidad Católica advanced to Round of 16 but were eliminated by Colombia's América de Cali 0–1. Cardozo also played for the team in the 1993 edition, scoring one goal against Bolivia's Deportivo San José in group stage where his team won 2–5. Universidad Católica finished as runners-up in the 1993 edition, losing the final 5–1 to Brazil's São Paulo. Mexico's Atlante, the reigning champions in their domestic league, expressed interest in signing Cardozo after the cup. He was flown to Mexico to train with the team, but after about 15 days without receiving a formal offer, he returned to Chile. (Note: In a 2025 interview with Mexican sports analyst Toño de Valdés (es), Cardozo explained that Atlante had taken interest in him after watching several of his matches in the 1993 Copa Libertadores. However, upon arriving in Mexico, he found the process to be very informal and never engaged in official talks with the club’s management. Concerned by the situation, Cardozo decided to return to Chile.)

Soon after his return, Cardozo was called up by Club Olimpia, where he played for two years, scoring 27 goals in 41 appearances. In his first year, he won the 1993 Paraguayan Primera División championship, with Olimpia finishing undefeated that season and beating their rivals Cerro Porteño in a tiebreaker match decided by a penalty shootout after a 0–0 draw in regular time. Cardozo successfully converted one of the penalties. He scored seven goals in ten appearances during the season. Internationally, he represented Olimpia twice in the 1993 Supercopa Libertadores, scoring one goal against Brazil's Flamengo in the group stage, although the team did not advance to the knockout phase.

In 1994, Cardozo continued to played for Olimpia, finishing as runners-up in the Paraguayan Primera División after a 1–1 aggregate draw with Cerro Porteño, losing the final match in a penalty shootout. During the league he played 22 games and scored 16 goals. Internationally, he participated in the 1994 Supercopa Libertadores, playing two matches but scoring no goals, and in the 1994 Copa Libertadores, where he appeared in nine games and scored three goals: two in a 3–1 aggregate victory over Ecuador's Barcelona de Guayaquil in the round of 16, and another in the semifinals against São Paulo, where Olimpia drew 2–2. Cardozo's team was ultimately eliminated in a penalty shootout.

=== Toluca: 1995–2005 ===
In December 1994, at 23 years old, Cardozo signed with the Mexican club Toluca FC. He made his debut in the 1994–95 Mexican Primera División season on 8 January 1995 in an away match against Tampico Madero, which Toluca lost 2–0. At the time of his arrival, the team was in crisis, having not won a league title since the 1974–75 season and facing the threat of relegation. In his first season, Cardozo appeared in eight matches and made three goals, but was sidelined for about a year and a half due to a knee injury sustained while playing for the Paraguay national team, which worsened during the Mexican league season. Although doctors assured him he would recover, the injury was severe enough for Cardozo to fear he might never play professionally again or at least not at the same level. During that period, Toluca was managed by Miguel Ángel López, who did not include Cardozo in the main squad. However, following López's departure in 1996, the club's management gave Cardozo a vote of confidence and assigned him for the upcoming season under the new manager Enrique Meza. Cardozo made his return in Invierno 1997, the first short tournament of the 1997–98 season, scoring seven goals in 13 appearances, including a hat-trick in a 4–0 victory over Veracruz. Toluca did not advance to the playoffs that season.

In the following season, Verano 1998, Cardozo helped Toluca secure their first championship in over 23 years. Toluca dominated the regular season, finishing first in the table standings, and advanced through the liguilla (playoffs), ultimately defeating Club Necaxa 6–4 on aggregate in the final. Cardozo scored two goals in the final and finished the season as the league's top goalscorer, with 18 goals in total—13 in the regular season and five in the playoffs. In Invierno 1998, Toluca finished second in the standings but were eliminated by Atlas 3–2 on aggregate in the quarter-finals. Cardozo scored 13 goals, ranking second in the league. In Verano 1999, Toluca topped the table and won the championship, defeating Atlas in a penalty shootout after a 5–5 aggregate in the final. Cardozo scored during the match and successfully converted a penalty in the shootout. The match is widely regarded as one of the greatest finals in Mexican football history. Cardozo concluded the season as the league's top goalscorer with 15 goals.

Following his dominant performance in the tournament and with his contract nearing its end, Cardozo attracted interest from several clubs, including Mexico's Club América, England's Arsenal under Arsène Wenger, Spain's Real Zaragoza and Atlético Madrid, and one unnamed team from Japan. The connection with Arsenal originated through a Paraguayan national with ties to the club. Zaragoza's offer, meanwhile, fell through after they were unable to match his salary at Toluca. Cardozo said he had originally planned to play in Europe but was nervous about making the move. He ultimately chose to remain at Toluca, both to continue building the team's legacy and out of gratitude for the fans and the club's management, who had supported him during his early years while he was injured.

In his ten years with the team, he has scored a record 249 goals for the club, including 36 goals in 25 matches in the 2002 Apertura. Cardozo was top scorer of the league four times (Verano 1998, Verano 1999, Apertura 2002, and Clausura 2003). He moved to the 4th spot in the list of all-time top scorers in the Mexico Primera Division after Jared Borgetti scored his 250th goal with Monarcas Morelia.

Cardozo was a key figure in Toluca's "golden era," spanning from 1998 to 2002, during which the club won four league titles and cemented one of the most dominant periods in Liga MX history. Under the coaches Meza (1997–2000) and Ricardo La Volpe (2001–2002), the team was known for its precise, attack-minded style of play and frequently won by large goal margins, with Cardozo serving as the central figure.

Due to his work at Toluca, Cardozo was elected as the Paraguayan Footballer of the Year in the years 2000, 2002 and 2003; and the South American Footballer of the Year in 2002. While playing for Toluca, Cardozo struggled through the 1997 campaign with hamstring problems and then played through much of the 2001 season despite suffering a broken wrist in the season opener. Cardozo is the all-time leading scorer for Toluca, with 249 goals in 332 appearances. He is widely regarded as one of the best foreign players to ever compete in Mexico's Liga MX. During his time with Toluca, he earned the nicknames El Diablo Mayor (The Master Devil), a reference to the club’s devil mascot, and El Príncipe Guaraní (The Guaraní Prince), in homage to his Guaraní heritage.

On 26 June 2001, shortly after the Copa Libertadores Final, Cardozo’s representative, Alejandro Mancuso, confirmed that the player was being pursued by Argentina's River Plate, amid rumors of an US$8 million offer. Cardozo remained in Buenos Aires after the final to consider the proposal and stated that he was interested in joining either River Plate or Boca Juniors, the latter having shown interest in him several years earlier. He commented, "If I make a change, it’s not because they might pay me more or anything like that. I'm coming because I want to play for a big club here, and that's all."

=== Later career, retirement: 2005–2006 ===
Cardozo left Toluca in July 2005 to join San Lorenzo de Almagro on a contract worth US$400,000. He stated that he had received offers from clubs in Mexico, Qatar and Japan but chose San Lorenzo for its reputation as one of Argentina's Big Five football clubs, for the challenge of competing at that level, and to be closer to his family in Paraguay. During negotiations, club manager Gustavo Alfaro and president Rafael Savino (es) traveled from Argentina to Mexico to meet with Cardozo and persuade him to join the team. At 34 years old, Cardozo expressed happiness and optimism about continuing his career with the team. Cardozo was San Lorenzo's fifth player signing of the 2005–06 Argentine Primera División season and made his debut against Club Atlético Vélez Sarsfield. (Note: The San Lorenzo players signed that year were the goalkeeper Sebastián Saja, defenders Juan Fernández and Raúl Saavedra, and Colombian midfielders Andrés Pérez and Mauricio Molina.)

However, his career with San Lorenzo was plagued with injuries. In August, he suffered a muscle injury on his left calf in the first half of a match against Club Estudiantes de La Plata and was out for three weeks. Despite not being fully recovered, he scored his first two goals in September for the club in an away game against Rosario Central, which San Lorenzo won 0–4; Cardozo entered the match in the second half and scored both goals. In November, he scored two more goals in a 4–2 victory against Newell's Old Boys, though he noted that he was not in peak form and still had lingering injuries. He scored his last goal with San Lorenzo in February 2006 against Club Olimpo in a 2–0 victory. Cardozo spent less than twelve months in San Lorenzo, where he played 22 matches and scored 5 goals.

In July 2006, at age 35, Cardozo reached a verbal agreement to play for Uruguay's Peñarol for the remainder of the calendar year. The deal reportedly included a monthly salary of about US$20,000, along with a house in Carrasco, Montevideo, and a vehicle. However, the agreement was delayed and never finalized. Cardozo later revealed that he had also received a US$1 million offer from a Major League Soccer (MLS) team in the United States but declined it. He then attempted to return to Paraguay to play for Olimpia before retiring, but the league's transfer deadline had already passed, preventing the move. As a result, Cardozo decided to retire from professional football and became the Olimpia's club manager in November.

In January 2008, Cardozo resumed training and announced a potential return to professional football through negotiations with the MLS team Chivas USA, confirming that talks were well underway. In an interview, he stated that he had not lost hope of playing professionally again. However, the deal ultimately did not materialize. Later that year in June, a farewell match was held for Cardozo at Toluca’s home ground, Estadio Nemesio Diez. In front of a sellout crowd, Cardozo’s team—composed of Toluca's 1998 squad—faced a side that included several players from Mexico's 1994 FIFA World Cup team. When Cardozo was substituted a few minutes before the final whistle, the match was briefly paused as players and fans paid tribute to him. As he left the pitch, the crowd chanted in Spanish, "Te queremos, Cardozo, te queremos" ("We love you, Cardozo, we love you"). Cardozo scored both goals in his team’s 2–1 victory. After the match, he took a celebratory lap around the pitch, carried on his teammates' shoulders as fans cheered from the stands.

== International career ==
Cardozo was called up to the Paraguay national football team in 1991 while playing for FC St. Gallen. He made his international debut on 14 June 1991 in a Copa Paz del Chaco friendly match against Bolivia, which Paraguay won 1–0. On 12 July 1991, Cardozo scored his first international goal with the national football team in a 1991 Copa América match against Argentina, in which Paraguay lost 4–1. In his tenth cap with the team, Cardozo scored his second international goal on 22 June 1995 against New Zealand in the Copa Centenario del Fútbol Chileno (es), a match Paraguay won 3–2 to claim the tournament title. Cardozo again represented Paraguay in the 1995 Copa América, where he scored a goal against Mexico, securing a 2–1 victory, and another against Venezuela in a 3–2 win, both in group stage. Paraguay were ultimately eliminated by Colombia in the quarterfinals after a penalty shootout. In the 1998 FIFA World Cup qualifiers, Cardozo represented Paraguay in five matches, scoring one goal from a penalty against Uruguay to secure a 3–1 home victory. Paraguay qualified for the 1998 FIFA World Cup, finishing second in the CONMEBOL standings behind Argentina.

Cardozo was the all-time leading scorer for the Paraguay national team, with 25 goals, until 2013, with the record being broken by Roque Santa Cruz. He played for his country at the 1998 and 2002 World Cups and was named in the original 2006 World Cup squad but he was injured during training sessions and replaced by Dante López. Cardozo was also an over-age player at the 2004 Summer Olympics, when Paraguay finished second. On 4 August, before the Summer Olympics began, he played in a preparation game against the Portugal of Cristiano Ronaldo in the city of Algarve, resulting in a 5–0 defeat. He scored a hat-trick against Uruguay in the 2006 FIFA World Cup qualification, with the final result being 4–1.

== Coaching career ==
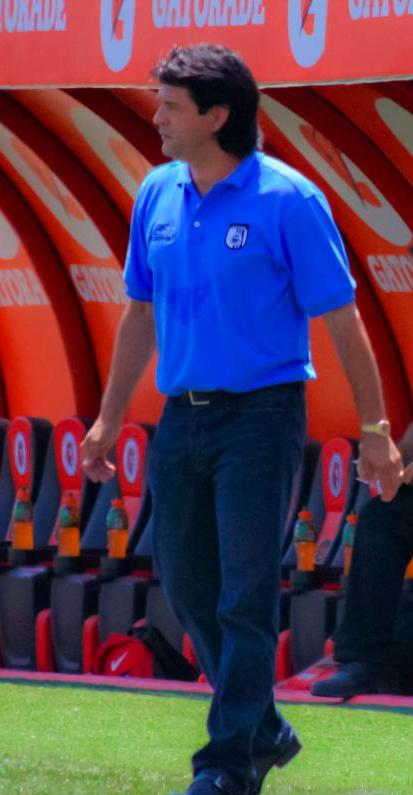
Cardozo while manager of Querétaro.

In November 2006, Club Olimpia's coach Oscar Paulin was fired due to poor performances by the team and Cardozo was named as the interim coach of the Paraguayan club, this being his first experience as a coach. He coached for the remainder of the year and for the 2007 Apertura tournament.

In October 2009 he was hired to be an assistant coach for the team of Indios de Juarez for the Apertura 2009.

Cardozo returned to Olimpia Asunción in November 2009 following coach Carlos Kiese's resignation.

In 2011, he was hired as coach Querétaro FC where he led the team into their first liguilla and the team's all team highest place (8th) and points (26) in Primera División regular season. He managed to eliminate Guadalajara in the Quarter Finals and advance to a surprising semi-final where they lost to champions Tigres UANL 1–0. The following season however, Querétaro began the season with poor results, which once again emerged relegation problems against rivals Atlas and Estudiantes Tecos (relegated) which led to Cardozo's resignation.

After spending the 2011 and 2012 seasons at Querétaro, he was appointed to manage Olimpia once again on 25 September 2012 after the departure of Gregorio Perez.

On 7 May 2013, Cardozo was announced as the new manager for Toluca FC of Mexico where he played for 10 years (1995–2005). On 1 May 2016, during the 2016 Clausura, Cardozo confirmed that he would no longer coach Toluca beyond the end of the season despite still having a year left on his contract. He stated that since he did not meet his objective of reaching the Liga MX playoffs with the club, he had nothing more to do with the club, citing that Toluca was a big club with directors and fans that expected a lot more of the team than he could continue to offer. He stated that when a team can no longer accomplish what is asked of it, that the first change that must come is the manager, no questions about it. His team finished as runners-up in the 2013–14 CONCACAF Champions League, drawing 1–1 on aggregate against Cruz Azul before ultimately losing in a penalty shootout.

Cardozo had a turbulent season at Chiapas during the Apertura 2016, being sacked in September and then brought back due to the petition of the chiapas players. He was ultimately sacked one week later after two more defeats.

Cardozo took over Club Puebla early in the Clausura 2017 season.

On 12 June 2018, Cardozo was appointed manager of Liga MX club Guadalajara.

== Personal life ==
Cardozo is married to Raquel Koube and have two children, Antonella and Constanza.

== Career statistics ==
#	Date	Venue	Opponent	Score	Result	Competition
1.	12 July 1991	Concepción, Chile	Argentina	1–4	Loss	1991 Copa América
2.	22 June 1995	Santiago, Chile	New Zealand	3–2	Win	1995 Copa Centenario
3.	6 July 1995	Maldonado, Uruguay	Mexico	2–1	Win	1995 Copa América
4.	12 July 1995	Maldonado, Uruguay	Venezuela	3–2	Win	1995 Copa América
5.	26 July 1996	Asunción, Paraguay	Bolivia	2–0	Win	Friendly
6.	30 April 1997	Asunción, Paraguay	Uruguay	3–1	Win	1998 FIFA World Cup qualification
7.	3 June 1998	București, Romania	Romania	2–3	Loss	Friendly
8.	24 June 1998	Toulouse, France	Nigeria	3–1	Win	1998 FIFA World Cup
9.	29 June 2000	Santiago, Chile	Chile	1–3	Loss	2002 FIFA World Cup qualification
10.	2 September 2000	Asunción, Paraguay	Venezuela	3–0	Win	2002 FIFA World Cup qualification
11.	15 November 2000	Asunción, Paraguay	Peru	5–1	Win	2002 FIFA World Cup qualification
12.	24 April 2001	Quito, Ecuador	Ecuador	1–2	Loss	2002 FIFA World Cup qualification
13.	5 September 2001	Asunción, Paraguay	Bolivia	5–1	Win	2002 FIFA World Cup qualification
14.	5 September 2001	Asunción, Paraguay	Bolivia	5–1	Win	2002 FIFA World Cup qualification
15.	13 February 2002	Ciudad del Este, Paraguay	Bolivia	2–2	Draw	Friendly
16.	26 March 2003	San Diego, United States	Mexico	1–1	Draw	Friendly
17.	10 September 2003	Asunción, Paraguay	Uruguay	4–1	Win	2006 FIFA World Cup qualification
18.	10 September 2003	Asunción, Paraguay	Uruguay	4–1	Win	2006 FIFA World Cup qualification
19.	10 September 2003	Asunción, Paraguay	Uruguay	4–1	Win	2006 FIFA World Cup qualification
20.	15 November 2003	Asunción, Paraguay	Ecuador	2–1	Win	2006 FIFA World Cup qualification
21.	1 June 2004	La Paz, Bolivia	Bolivia	1–2	Loss	2006 FIFA World Cup qualification
22.	19 January 2005	Los Angeles, United States	South Korea	1–1	Draw	Friendly
23.	27 March 2005	Quito, Ecuador	Ecuador	2–5	Loss	2006 FIFA World Cup qualification
24.	30 March 2005	Asunción, Paraguay	Chile	2–1	Win	2006 FIFA World Cup qualification
25.	27 May 2006	Aarhus, Denmark	Denmark	1–1	Draw	Friendly

== Honours ==
Olimpia

- Paraguayan League: 1993

Toluca

- Mexican Primera División: Verano 1998, Verano 1999, Verano 2000, Apertura 2002
- CONCACAF Champions' Cup: 2003

Cruz Azul

- Copa Libertadores runner-up: 2001

Paraguay

- CONMEBOL Men Pre-Olympic Tournament: 1992
- Olympic Silver Medal: 2004

Individual

- Mexican Primera División Golden Ball: Apertura 2002
- Liga MX Top Goalscorer: Verano 1998, Verano 1999, Apertura 2002, Clausura 2003
- IFFHS World's Best Top Division Goal Scorer: 2003 (58 goals)
- Paraguayan Footballer of the Year: 2000, 2002, 2003
- South American Footballer of the Year: 2002
- South American Team of the Year: 2002, 2003, 2004
- International Football Hall of Fame (es): 2011
- All-time scorer for Toluca FC (249 goals)

== See also ==
- Players and Records in Paraguayan Football
