= Daniel Gómez Rinaldi =

Argentine journalist and actor

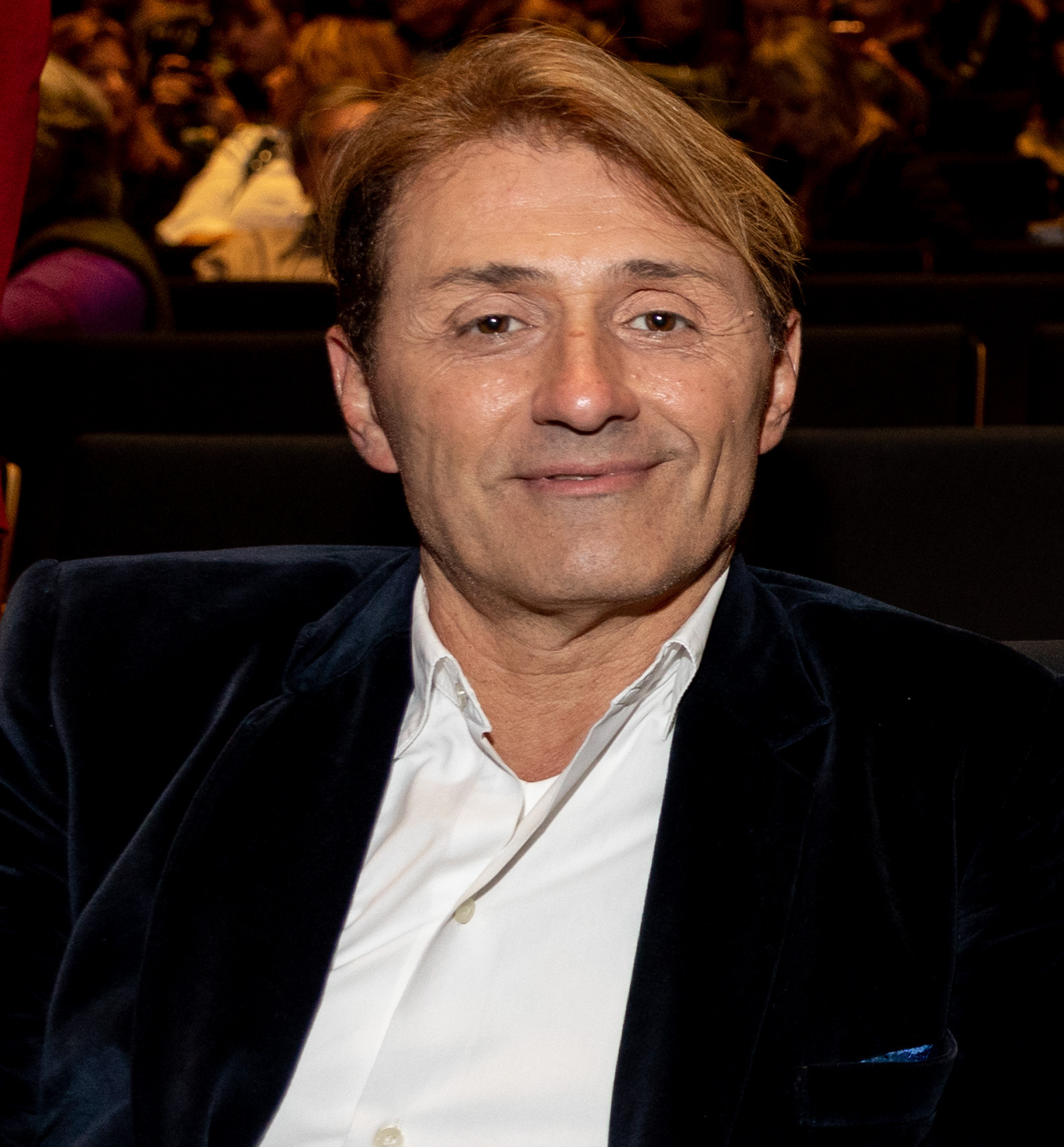
Daniel Gómez Rinaldi, 2024

Daniel Gómez Rinaldi: (born 19 November 1965, in San Martín, Buenos Aires) is an Argentine journalist who has worked as actor sometimes.

== Professional career ==
=== Early years ===
He studied journalism at the Instituto Grafotécnico o Escuela Superior de Periodismo and in the 80s began to work on radio before working in graphic journalism.

After, he worked between 1989 and 1995 at the English newspaper The Buenos Aires Herald, and different magazines like Semanario, Libre, Tal Cuál and La Revista.

In 1996, he created the magazine Buenos Aires Fashion News and worked for Chicas y Modelos.

=== TV works ===
In 1997, he began his artistic career on TV when he worked with Lucho Avilés at the mid-afternoon show Indiscreciones, where he worked until 1999.

Between 2000 and 2002 participated in Telepasillo and, in 2002, was the presenter of Siempre Listos.

Finally, he began to work in Intrusos en el Espectáculo in 2003 with Jorge Rial. Now, he is working in the programme. Also, he worked in other shows like Intocables (2004), Detrás de Escena (2005) and Gran Hermano 2007: El Debate (2007).

He worked for the radio shows La Tapa in 2004 and Llamas con todo in 2006.

He was a contestant in Bailando por un Sueño 2011 and was paired with professional dancer Ana Laura López. He was replaced during the 6th and 7th rounds due to an injury. He re-entered the competition in the 8th round, but was eliminated in a double elimination.
