= Mónica Farro =

Uruguayan model and actress (born 1976)

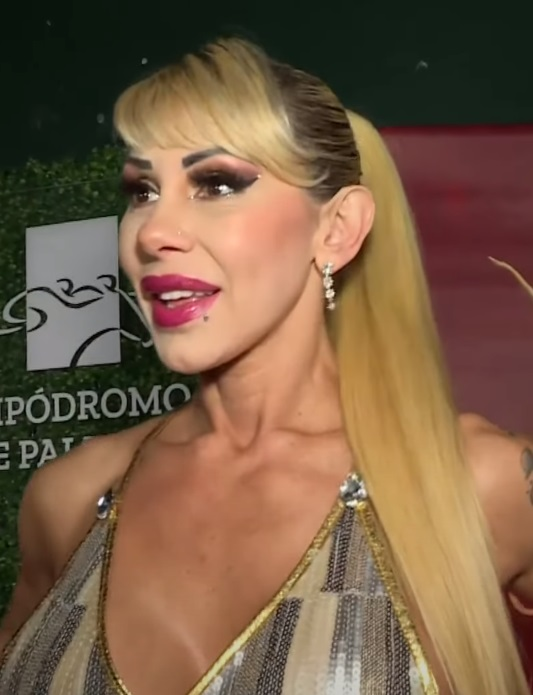
- Farro in 2023
- Born: 28 February 1976 (age 49); Montevideo, Uruguay
- Occupations: Model; actress
- Spouse: Enrique Ferraro (m. 1993, divorced)
- Children: 1

Mónica Farro (born 28 February 1976) is an Uruguayan model and actress of theatre and television. She started her career as a child commercial model and then worked as an erotic actress and fetish model for Playboy TV. She was chosen as Miss Uruguay for Playboy's 2004 Miss Playboy.

== Theatre ==
Farro's launch to fame was in 2007 after being discovered by the Argentine theatre producer Gerardo Sofovich in the Uruguayan capital, Montevideo. He signed Farro to his theatre company for two years in which she performed in his comedy No somos santas and his musical comedy Le Referi Cornud. In 2008 she was cast by Sofovich to co-star in the magazine La Fiesta Está En El Lago alongside dancer Valeria Archimó and actress-dancer Adabel Guerrero, with all three writing. It was produced and directed by Sofovich, and also directed by René Bertrand.

In 2009 Farro was signed into Carmen Barbieri's theatre company and was the protagonist of two of her magazines, Fantástica in the 2009-10 theatrical season and Bravísima in the 2010–11 season, both as the First Vedette. Farro decided not to sign for another year in the company, because she wasn't pleased with some of her cast members, especially Uruguayan actress-dancer and fashion model, Andrea Ghidone and Greek-Argentine amateur glamour model and media personality, Victoria Xipolitakis. Barbieri commented that she would have Farro back for the 2013-14 summer season at all costs.

After four years of doing classical revue musicals, Farro was called in 2011 to lead and debut as a supervedette and as her own producer in an alternative revue show mixed with musical comedy with Negro Álvarez, touring all of Argentina and parts of Uruguay.

On November 2, 2012, the actress made an appearance for the river border state of Argentina, Entre Ríos Province, in the Astros Theatre, where she and many other theatre artists presented Entre Ríos' summer theatrical season debut for 2012 and 2013 with three shows. She starred as the lead actress in one of these, the theatre comedy La noche de las pistolas frías.

In November, Farro led a mini theatre magazine show, Empetroladas alongside dancing partner Cristian Ponce in Cutral Có, Neuquén, Argentina.

On January 4, 2013, La noche de las pistolas frías debuted in El Gran Teatro Colón in Entre Ríos, with Farro alongside Emilio Disi, Martín "Campi" Campilongo, Claudia Ciardone, Florencia "Flopy" Tesouro, Manuel Navarrete, Cristina Alberó and Luly Drozdek.

Year(s)	Musical show	Notes
2000s	Despedida de Soltera	Supporting actress In Teatro del Centro (Montevideo)
2007-08	No somos santas	Supporting actress In Teatro Tabarís (Corrientes), alongside Nazarena Vélez and Andrea Estévez; by Gerardo Sofovich
2007-08	Le Referi Cornud	Lead guest actress In Teatro Tabarís (Corrientes, alongside Iliana Calabró, Turco Naim and Rocío Marengo; by Gerardo Sofovich
2008-09	La Fiesta Está En El Lago	Co-Lead Vedette alongside Valeria Archimó and Adabel Guerrero; by Gerardo Sofovich
2009-10	Fantástica	First Vedette alongside Daniela Cardone (Vedette Cómico); Carmen Barbieri and Javier Faroni (head producers), Santiago Bal (writer and director)
2010-11	Bravísima	First Vedette alongside Belén Francese (Vedette Cómico); Carmen Barbieri and Javier Faroni (head producers), Santiago Bal (writer and director), in Teatro Atlas (Mar del Plata)
2011-12	Mortal!	Lead Supervedette and personal producer Lead actress, dancer, singer, in Teatro del Lago (Villa Carlos Paz), alongside El Negro Álvarez
2012	Empetrolados	Lead Supervedette, accompanied by Cristian Ponce; mini-revue dance musical; Lead Star Dancer
2013-	La noche de las pistolas frías	Lead Actress; In Gran Teatro Colón (Entre Ríos)

== Bailando 2008 and El Musical de tus Sueños ==
Farro participated in the fifth season of Bailando por un Sueño with professional dancer Nicolás Scillama; she reached the top eight.

Mónica had a special participation in El Musical de tus Sueños in 2009, dancing on double stripper poles alongside Valeria Archimó, opening for the special edition re-entry gala (which Guerrero entered).

== Bailando 2011 ==
Farro has participated in the seventh season of Bailando por un Sueño with professional dancer Christian Ponce.

== Realities shows ==
Year	Title	Role	Result	Notes
2008	Bailando por un sueño 2008	Contestant	30th eliminated	
2011	Bailando 2011	Contestant	16th eliminated	
2014	Viviendo con las estrellas	Celebrity	10th eliminated	
2022	El Hotel de los Famosos	Candidate in repechage	Official Contestant	9 episodes
2022	El Hotel de los Famosos	Contestant	Evacuated	9 episodes
2023	El Hotel De Los Famosos (season 2)	Huésped VIP		2 episodes
2023	Bailando 2023	Contestant	8th eliminated	

== Personal life ==
Farro was married to Uruguayan footballer Enrique Ferraro, with whom she had a child named Diego Ferraro Farro in Uruguay.

== See also ==
- List of Playboy models
- List of glamour models

== Sources ==
- "Biografía de Mónica Farro" (in Spanish). Archived from the original on 3 March 2016.
- "Mónica Farro, interview" (in Spanish). by Samuell. Archived from the original on 21 February 2013.
- "Participantes de Bailando por un Sueño 5 en ShowMatch" (in Spanish). extremista.com.ar. 8 April 2008. Archived from the original on 12 May 2012.
- "Mónica Farro: "No hubiera aceptado quedarme con este elenco"" (in Spanish).
