= Marco Figueroa =

Mexican footballer (born 1989)

Personal information
- Full name: Marco Antonio Figueroa Valle
- Date of birth: December 4, 1989 (age 36)
- Place of birth: Ayutla, Mexico
- Height: 1.80 m (5 ft 11 in)
- Position: Defender

Senior career*
Years	Team	Apps	(Gls)
2009–2010	Veracruz	3	(0)
2010–2011	C.F. La Piedad	8	(0)
2013–2014	Alebrijes	0	(0)
2016–2017	Potros UAEM	2	(0)
Total		13	(0)
- * Club domestic league appearances and goals

Marco Antonio Figueroa Valle (born December 4, 1989, in Ayutla, Jalisco) is a Mexican professional footballer who last played for Potros UAEM.
