= Larissa Riquelme =

Paraguayan model and actress

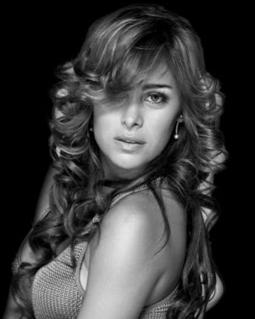
- Riquelme in 2010
- Born: Larissa Mabel Riquelme Frutos; 22 February 1985 (age 41); Asunción, Paraguay
- Occupations: Model; actress
- Years active: 2010–present
- Partner: Jonathan Fabbro (2011–2019)
- Modeling information
- Height: 1.70 m (5 ft 7 in)
- Hair color: Brown
- Eye color: Brown

Larissa Mabel Riquelme Frutos (born 22 February 1985) is a Paraguayan model and actress. She is one of the highest-paid models in Paraguay.

== Biography ==
A famous model and actress in Paraguay, Riquelme rose to international prominence during the 2010 FIFA World Cup. A supporter of both the Paraguay national football team and the club Cerro Porteño, she was first pictured in international media celebrating a goal during the game between Paraguay and Slovakia with her Nokia mobile phone between her breasts and she was wearing a T-shirt with Paraguay's colors (as part of a promotion for a mobile phone company). Riquelme is the face of the deodorant brand Axe in Paraguay and at a later Paraguay game in the World Cup she was also seen with the word "Axe" written on her chest as advertising for the deodorant brand.

After becoming one of the most searched people on the Internet, she was named "World Cup's Girlfriend" by Marca, the largest Spanish sports newspaper. She was also described as the most famous fan of the World Cup.

Following her rise to fame, and after Argentina's coach Diego Maradona promised to run naked through Buenos Aires if Argentina won the 2010 World Cup, Riquelme matched the offer and promised that she would run naked (wearing only body paint in the colors of Paraguay) through Asunción if Paraguay won the World Cup, or even if they reached the semi-finals by beating Spain. Paraguay eventually lost its match against Spain, but Riquelme announced that she would fulfill her promise anyway, a promise that she kept. That same year, Riquelme did a nude pictorial for the September 2010 issue of Playboy Brazil.

Apart from modelling and acting, Riquelme has also participated in Bailando por un Sueño, the Argentinian version of Dancing with the Stars.

She has completed a three-year education in communications, and works as a football commentator.
