= Nueva Italia, Paraguay =

Nueva Italia
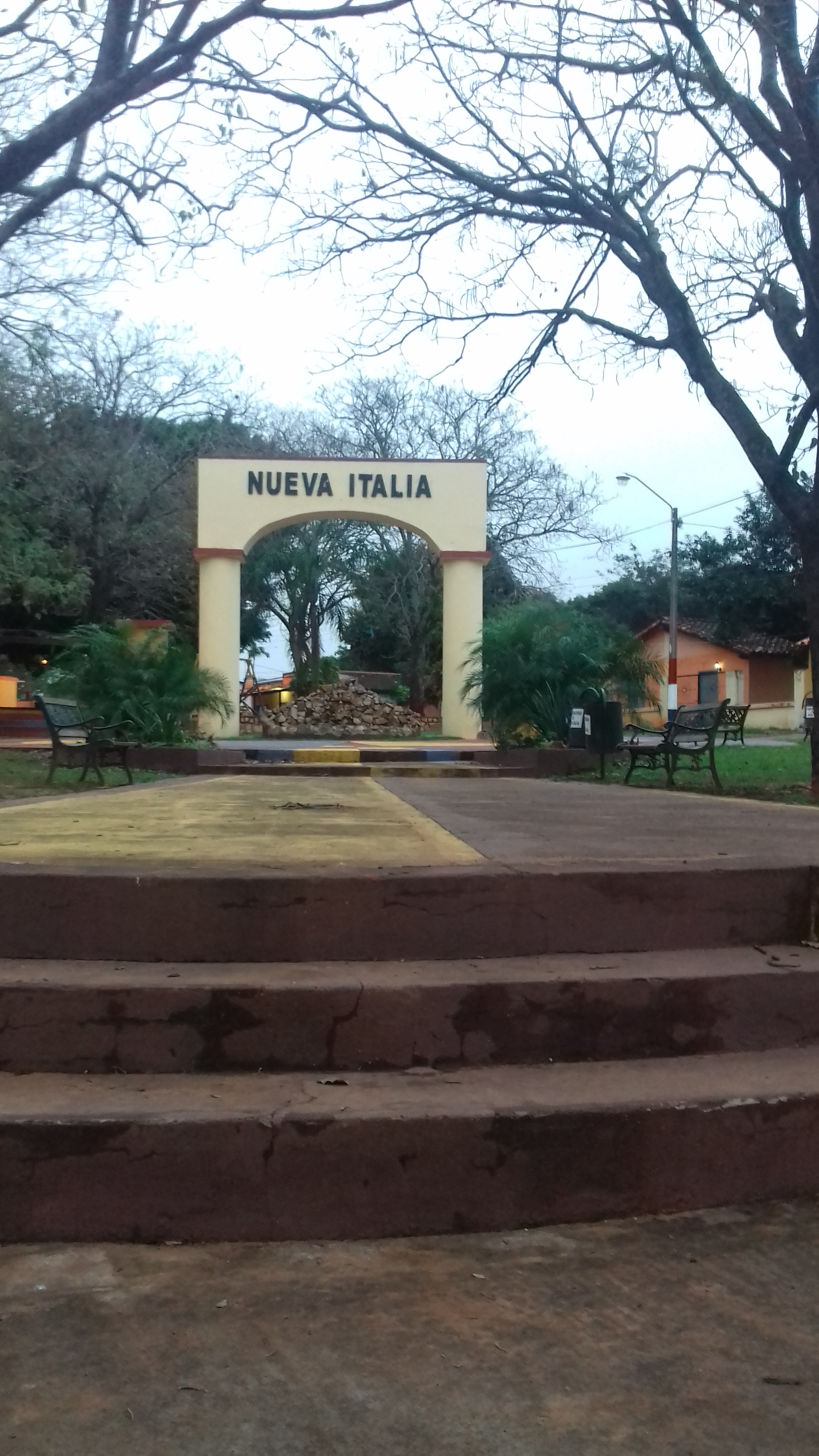

- Location within Paraguay
- Coordinates: 25°37′12″S 57°30′0″W
- Country: Paraguay
- Department: Central
- Elevation: 130 m (430 ft)

Population (2008)
  - Total: 3 367
- Climate: Cfa

Nueva Italia (Spanish for New Italy) is a town in the Central Department of Paraguay.

== History ==
Nueva Italia was created in 1904 by the Paraguay government in order to establish some colonists from Italy and their 18 families in a farming area 40 km south of the capital Asunción. In addition to Italians, a community of German and Ukrainian emigrants also moved to Nueva Italia.

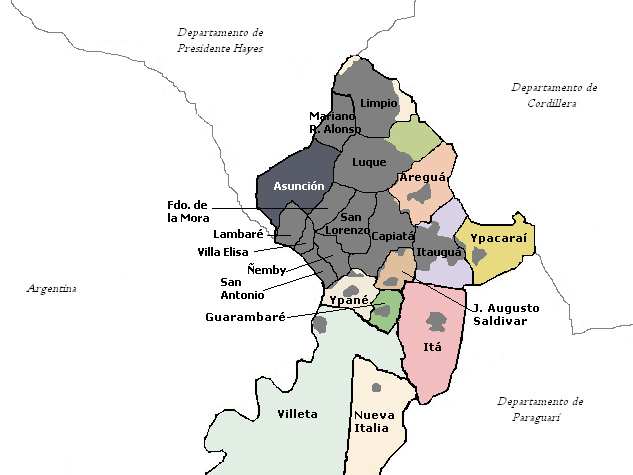
In grey all the urban area of the Greater Asuncion & surroundings, showing Nueva Italia

The first manager-administrator of this Colonia Nueva Italia (as was officially named) was the Italian count Enrico Statella. After WW1 many Italians returned to Italy or moved to the capital Asuncion, but the settlement -after an initial crisis- survived & remained as a small agricultural center. Mura, Musto and Carolini were some of the Italian families that remained and perfectly integrated with the local Paraguayan population.

In the 1930s the colony was a success and grew in importance as a farming city for the Greater Asunción area

In 1956 was created the Distrito Nueva Italia, that in the 2010s have nearly 20,000 inhabitants.

The main activities are farming and husbandry. Recently is being developed some tourism, thanks to new roads toward the capital and other surroundings

The city is located to the north of the "Distrito Nueva Italia" and has a perfect square shape, because of the original urban planning promoted by count Enrico Statella.

== Notable people ==
- José Cardozo, football player

== See also ==
- Italians in Paraguay
- Italian diaspora
