= Luis Chérrez =

Ecuadorian footballer (born 1968)

Personal information
- Date of birth: 19 January 1968 (age 58)
- Position: Midfielder

International career
Years	Team	Apps	(Gls)
1993–1994	Ecuador	2	(0)

Luis Chérrez (born 19 January 1968) is an Ecuadorian former footballer. He played in two matches for the Ecuador national football team from 1993 to 1994. He was also part of Ecuador's squad for the 1993 Copa América tournament.
