= Carlos Soca =

Uruguayan footballer (born 1969)

Personal information
- Full name: Carlos Favier Soca Iturburu
- Date of birth: 24 January 1969 (age 57)
- Place of birth: Montevideo, Uruguay
- Height: 1.76 m (5 ft 9 in)
- Position: Defender

Senior career*
Years	Team	Apps	(Gls)
1988–1993	Nacional		
1993	Argentinos Juniors	1	(0)
1994–1995	Racing	23	(0)
1995	Nacional		
1996	Peñarol		
1998	Nacional		
1999	Esporte Clube Juventude		
2000	Juventud de Las Piedras		

International career
1993	Uruguay	1	(0)
- * Club domestic league appearances and goals

Carlos Favier Soca Iturburu (born 24 January 1969) is a former Uruguayan footballer.

== Club career ==
Soca played for Argentinos Juniors and Racing Club de Avellaneda in the Primera División de Argentina. He also played for Juventude in the 1999 Copa do Brasil.

== International career ==
Soca made one appearance for the senior Uruguay national football team, a 1994 FIFA World Cup qualifier against Venezuela on 29 August 1993. After 37 minutes he was substituted by Cesilio de los Santos.
