= Oscar Roberto Godói =

Brazilian football referee (born 1955)

- Born: 4 June 1955 (age 71); São José do Rio Preto, Brazil

Domestic
Years	League	Role
1990–2001	FPF, CBF	Referee

International
Years	League	Role
1993–2000	FIFA	Referee

Oscar Roberto Godói (born 4 June 1955), is a Brazilian former football referee and a sports commentator.

== Referee career ==
Having started his career in 1990 and with rapid rise, Godói had a reputation as a discipliner, being responsible for several controversial expulsions, the most emblematic being that of Sérgio Alves from Ceará, in the final of the 1994 Copa do Brasil, and that of Rogério Pinheiro from São Paulo in 1995. Júnior Baiano, at the time in São Paulo, who accused Godói of refereeing while drunk. The player was sued by Godói.

Godói was also the referee in the decision of the Copa João Havelange in 2000, when the stands at the Estádio São Januário collapsed due to overcrowding. His last match was for the Campeonato Paulista Série A2, where Paulista (at the time, Etti Jundiaí), won the title.

== Sports commentator career ==
Soon after retiring, Godói started working as a sports commentator, focusing on topics related to arbitration. Due to his strong and laid-back personality, he quickly became successful. He worked at Rede Record from 2002 to 2007, and later at TV Gazeta and Rádio Transamérica. He was marked by the catchphrase "Carimba Godói", when he was consulted to validate the legality of goals scored in matches in which he was the commentator. Currently presents a regional version of the program "Os Donos da Bola", on TV Bandeirantes.

== Surviving a robbery ==
On 16 February 2011, Godói responded to an attempted robbery, in the region of Perdizes, São Paulo, being shot three times, in the collarbone and lung. Godói was hospitalized for 10 days at the Hospital das Clínicas da Universidade de São Paulo.
