= Enrique Ferraro =

Uruguayan football player (born 1970)

Personal information
- Full name: Enrique Bernardino Ferraro Barr
- Date of birth: June 20, 1970 (age 56)
- Place of birth: Montevideo, Uruguay
- Height: 1.83 m (6 ft 0 in)
- Position: Forward

Senior career*
Years	Team	Apps	(Gls)
1990–1992	Bella Vista		
1993	Barcelona SC		
1994	Defensor Sporting		
1995	Deportivo Quito		
1996	Danubio		
1997	Fénix		
1997	O'Higgins	14	(12)
1998	Huachipato	3	(0)
1998	Deportes Antofagasta		
1999	Real Santa Cruz		
2000	Progreso		
2000	Rocha		
2001–2002	Juventud Las Piedras		
2003–2004	Rentistas	13	(0)
2005–2006	Central Español	49	(13)
2007–2008	Rampla Juniors	21	(2)
2008	Atenas	10	(0)

International career
1988	Uruguay U20	3	(0)
- * Club domestic league appearances and goals

Enrique Bernardino Ferraro Barr (born June 20, 1970, in Montevideo, Uruguay) is a Uruguayan former football player. He played for clubs in Uruguay, Chile Bolivia and Ecuador.

== Teams ==
- (Uruguay) Bella Vista 1990–1992
- (Ecuador) Barcelona 1993
- (Uruguay) Defensor Sporting 1994
- (Ecuador) Deportivo Quito 1995
- (Uruguay) Danubio 1996
- (Uruguay) Fénix 1997
- (Chile) O'Higgins 1997
- (Chile) Huachipato 1998
- (Chile) Deportes Antofagasta 1998
- (Bolivia) Real Santa Cruz 1999
- (Uruguay) Progreso 2000
- (Uruguay) Rocha 2000
- (Uruguay) Juventud Las Piedras 2001–2002
- (Uruguay) Rentistas 2003–2004
- (Uruguay) Central Español 2005–2006
- (Uruguay) Rampla Juniors 2007-2008
- (Uruguay) Atenas de San Carlos 2008

== International ==
- Uruguay U20 1988

== Titles ==
- (Uruguay) Bella Vista 1990 (Uruguayan Cup)

== Honours ==
- (Chile) O'Higgins 1997 (Top Scorer Torneo Clausura Chilean Primera B Championship)

== Personal life ==
He is now divorced from Uruguayan supervedette and actress, Mónica Farro with whom he has a child named Diego.
