= Andrés González (Peruvian footballer) =

Peruvian footballer (born 1968)

Personal information
- Full name: Andrés Aurelio González Luján
- Date of birth: 8 April 1968 (age 58)
- Place of birth: Callao, Peru

International career
Years	Team	Apps	(Gls)
1989–1996	Peru	18	(2)

Andrés Aurelio González Luján (born 8 April 1968) is a Peruvian footballer. He played in 18 matches for the Peru national football team from 1989 to 1996. He was also part of Peru's squad for the 1991 Copa América tournament.
