= Raúl Saavedra (footballer) =

Argentine footballer

Personal information
- Full name: Raúl Fernando Quito Saavedra
- Date of birth: March 8, 1978 (age 48)
- Place of birth: San Miguel de Tucumán, Argentina
- Height: 1.66 m (5 ft 5 in)
- Position: Left back

Senior career*
Years	Team	Apps	(Gls)
2000–2002	Atlético Tucumán		(5)
2002–2005	Quilmes	76	(3)
2005–2006	San Lorenzo	15	(0)
2006–2007	Quilmes	14	(0)
2007–2008	Olimpo	10	(0)
2008–2009	San Martín de Tucumán	20	(1)
2009–2010	Atlético Tucumán	17	(0)
2010–2011	San Martín de Tucumán	30	(3)
2011–2012	San Martín de San Juan	21	(2)
2012–2014	Mitre	47	(3)
2014–2015	Concepción FC	6	(0)
2016	Almirante Brown	12	(0)
2017–2019	Concepción FC	41	(3)
- * Club domestic league appearances and goals as of 30 June 2020

Raúl Fernando Saavedra (born 8 March 1978, in San Miguel de Tucumán) is an Argentine former football defender.

== Career ==
Saavedra started his playing career in 2000 in the Argentine 2nd division with Atlético Tucumán. Two years later he joined Quilmes and won promotion to the Argentine Primera with the club in 2003.

In 2005, he joined San Lorenzo but he returned to Quilmes after only one season. Following Quilmes' relegation the following season he joined Olimpo who were relegated the following season. In 2008, he joined newly promoted San Martín de Tucumán. On 23 November 2008 he scored his first goal for San Martín, a long range equalizer against Boca Juniors in a 1–2 defeat. However, Saavedra suffered another top flight relegation with San Martín at the end of the 2008–09 season. Subsequently, the defender joined San Martín's town rivals Atlético Tucumán, recently promoted to the Primera División. Nonetheless, he returned to San Martín after suffering his fourth top flight relegation in a row while at Atlético.
