= 1989 Rous Cup =

Tournament details
- Dates: 23–30 May
- Teams: 3 (from 2 confederations)
- Venue: 2 (in 2 host cities)

Final positions
- Champions: England
- Runners-up: Scotland
- Third place: Chile

Tournament statistics
- Matches played: 3
- Goals scored: 4 (1.33 per match)
- Attendance: 87,916 (29,305 per match)

The 1989 Rous Cup was the fifth and final staging of the Rous Cup international football competition, based around the England–Scotland football rivalry.

As in the previous two years, a South American team was also invited to compete in a triangular tournament, with Chile being this year's entrant. World champions Argentina had been originally invited but declined, citing domestic fixture congestion. Their invitation had been disapproved of by the British government, given the cut relations between the two nations following the 1982 Falklands War.

England won the competition for the second year running, and third time in its five years of existence. This marked the final time any England vs Scotland matches would be arranged by the countries until friendly played in August 2013. The three meetings between the teams that took place during this 24-year-long interval were during UEFA competitions (in the Euro 1996 group stage and the two legs of the Euro 2000 qualification play-offs).

Due to the English First Division being extended to enable Liverpool to complete their fixtures that had been postponed following the Hillsborough disaster on 15 April 1989, England were unable to select any players from Liverpool or Arsenal (Liverpool's final opponent) for the tournament.

== Results ==
All times listed are British Summer Time (UTC+1)

=== England vs Chile ===
23 May 1989
20:00

England	0–0	Chile
	Report

Wembley Stadium, London
Attendance: 15,628
Referee: Erik Fredriksson (Sweden)

ENGLAND:
GK	1	Peter Shilton (Derby County)
DF	2	Paul Parker (Queen's Park Rangers)
DF	3	Stuart Pearce (Nottingham Forest)
MF	4	Neil Webb (Nottingham Forest)
DF	5	Des Walker (Nottingham Forest)
DF	6	Terry Butcher (Rangers)
MF	7	Bryan Robson (Manchester United) (c)	Booked
MF	8	Paul Gascoigne (Tottenham Hotspur)	Booked
FW	9	Nigel Clough (Nottingham Forest)
FW	10	John Fashanu (Wimbledon)	Booked	(substituted off) 71'
MF	11	Chris Waddle (Tottenham Hotspur)
Substitutions:
FW		Tony Cottee (Everton)		(substituted on) 71'
Manager:
Bobby Robson

CHILE:
GK	1	Roberto Rojas (São Paulo) (c)
DF	2	Patricio Reyes (Universidad de Chile)	Booked
DF	3	Leonel Contreras (Everton)
DF	4	Hugo González (Colo-Colo)
MF	5	Jaime Pizarro (Colo-Colo)
FW	6	Hugo Rubio (Bologna)	Booked
MF	7	Raúl Ormeño (Colo-Colo)
FW	8	Juan Covarrubias (Cobreloa)			(substituted off) 46'
DF	9	Fernando Astengo (Grêmio)		Booked
DF	10	Rubén Espinoza (Colo-Colo)
MF	11	Osvaldo Hurtado (Charleroi)		(substituted off) 60'
Substitutions:
MF		Jaime Vera (OFI)		(substituted on) 60'
FW		Juan Carlos Letelier (Deportes La Serena)		(substituted on) 46'
Manager:
Orlando Aravena

=== Scotland vs England ===
27 May 1989
15:00

Scotland	0–2	England
	Report	Waddle 20'; Bull 82'

Hampden Park, Glasgow
Attendance: 63,282
Referee: Michel Vautrot (France)

SCOTLAND:
GK	1	Jim Leighton (Manchester United)
DF	5	Stewart McKimmie (Aberdeen)
DF	4	Alex McLeish (Aberdeen)	Booked
DF	3	Dave McPherson (Heart of Midlothian)
DF	2	Maurice Malpas (Dundee United)
MF	8	Pat Nevin (Everton)
MF	6	Roy Aitken (Celtic) (c)
MF	10	Paul McStay (Celtic)
MF	11	Bobby Connor (Aberdeen)		(substituted off) 57'
FW	9	Ally McCoist (Rangers)
FW	7	Mo Johnston (Nantes)
Substitutions:
MF	12	Peter Grant (Celtic)		(substituted on) 57'
Manager:
Andy Roxburgh

ENGLAND:
GK	1	Peter Shilton (Derby County)
DF	2	Gary Stevens (Rangers)
DF	3	Stuart Pearce (Nottingham Forest)
MF	6	Neil Webb (Nottingham Forest)
DF	4	Des Walker (Nottingham Forest)
DF	5	Terry Butcher (Rangers)
MF	7	Bryan Robson (Manchester United) (c)
MF	8	Trevor Steven (Rangers)
FW	11	John Fashanu (Wimbledon)	(substituted off) 31'
FW	9	Tony Cottee (Everton)	(substituted off) 75'
MF	10	Chris Waddle (Tottenham Hotspur)
Substitutions:
MF	14	Paul Gascoigne (Tottenham Hotspur)	(substituted on) 75'
FW	16	Steve Bull (Wolverhampton Wanderers)	(substituted on) 31'
Manager:
Bobby Robson

=== Scotland vs Chile ===
30 May 1989
20:00

Scotland	2–0	Chile
McInally 5'; MacLeod 53'	Report

Hampden Park, Glasgow
Attendance: 9,006
Referee: Alexis Ponnet (Belgium)

SCOTLAND:
GK	1	Jim Leighton (Manchester United) (c)
DF	2	Stewart McKimmie (Aberdeen)
DF	3	Maurice Malpas (Dundee United)
DF	4	Roy Aitken (Celtic)
DF	5	Alex McLeish (Aberdeen)
DF	6	Gary Gillespie (Liverpool)		(substituted off) 70'
FW	7	David Speedie (Coventry City)	Booked	(substituted off) 46'
MF	8	Peter Grant (Celtic)
MF	9	Murdo MacLeod (Borussia Dortmund)
MF	10	Paul McStay (Celtic)
FW	11	Alan McInally (Aston Villa)
Substitutions:
DF	17	Derek Whyte (Celtic)		(substituted on) 70'
FW	18	Mo Johnston (Nantes)		(substituted on) 46'
Manager:
Andy Roxburgh

CHILE:
GK	1	Roberto Rojas (São Paulo) (c)
DF	2	Patricio Reyes (Universidad de Chile)
DF	3	Leonel Contreras (Everton)
DF	4	Hugo González (Colo-Colo)
MF	5	Héctor Puebla (Cobreloa)
MF	6	Jaime Vera (OFI)
MF	7	Alejandro Hisis (OFI)
MF	8	Jaime Pizarro (Colo-Colo)
MF	9	Juvenal Olmos (Universidad Católica)		(substituted off) 65'
FW	10	Hugo Rubio (Bologna)
FW	11	Juan Covarrubias (Cobreloa)		(substituted off) 46'
Substitutions:
MF	20	Jaime Patricio Ramírez (Unión Española)		(substituted on) 65'
FW	22	Juan Carlos Letelier (Deportes La Serena)	Booked	(substituted on) 46'
Manager:
Orlando Aravena

== Final standings ==
Team	Pld	W	D	L	GF	GA	GD	Pts
England	2	1	1	0	2	0	+2	3
Scotland	2	1	0	1	2	2	0	2
Chile	2	0	1	1	0	2	−2	1

1989 Rous Cup
tournament winners

England

== Goalscorers ==
1 goal

- (England) Steve Bull
- (England) Chris Waddle
- (Scotland) Murdo MacLeod
- (Scotland) Alan McInally
