= Chile national football team results (1980–1999) =

This page details the match results and statistics of the Chile national football team from 1980 to 1999.

== Key ==
Key to matches

- Att.=Match attendance
- (H)=Home ground
- (A)=Away ground
- (N)=Neutral ground

Key to record by opponent

- Pld=Games played
- W=Games won
- D=Games drawn
- L=Games lost
- GF=Goals for
- GA=Goals against

== Results ==
Chile's score is shown first in each case.

| No. | Date | Venue | Opponents | Score | Competition | Chile scorers | Att. | Ref. |
|---|---|---|---|---|---|---|---|---|
| 316 | 24 June 1980 | Mineirão, Belo Horizonte (A) | Brazil | 1–2 | Friendly | Yáñez | 26,111 | |
| 317 | 21 August 1980 | Estadio Centenario, Montevideo (A) | Uruguay | 0–0 | Friendly | | — | |
| 318 | 18 September 1980 | Estadio Ciudad de Mendoza, Mendoza (A) | Argentina | 2–2 | Friendly | Vargas, Castec | — | |
| 319 | 10 March 1981 | Estadio Nacional, Santiago (H) | Colombia | 1–0 | Friendly | Herrera | — | |
| 320 | 14 March 1981 | Estádio Santa Cruz, Ribeirão Preto (A) | Brazil | 1–2 | Friendly | Caszely | 56,000 | |
| 321 | 19 March 1981 | Estadio El Campín, Bogotá (A) | Colombia | 2–1 | Friendly | Caszely (2) | 45,000 | |
| 322 | 19 April 1981 | Santiago (H) | Peru | 3–0 | Friendly | Moscoso (2), Caszely | — | |
| 323 | 29 April 1981 | Santiago (H) | Uruguay | 1–2 | Copa Juan Pinto Durán | Rojas | — | |
| 324 | 24 May 1981 | Estadio Modelo, Guayaquil (A) | Ecuador | 0–0 | 1982 FIFA World Cup qualification | | 50,000 | |
| 325 | 7 June 1981 | Estadio Defensores del Chaco, Asunción (A) | Paraguay | 1–0 | 1982 FIFA World Cup qualification | Yáñez | 46,178 | |
| 326 | 14 June 1981 | Estadio Nacional, Santiago (H) | Ecuador | 2–0 | 1982 FIFA World Cup qualification | Rivas, Caszely | 80,000 | |
| 327 | 21 June 1981 | Estadio Nacional, Santiago (H) | Paraguay | 3–0 | 1982 FIFA World Cup qualification | Caszely, Yáñez, M. Á. Neira | 80,000 | |
| 328 | 5 July 1981 | Estadio Nacional, Santiago (H) | Spain | 1–1 | Friendly | Yáñez | 15,000 | |
| 329 | 15 July 1981 | Estadio Centenario, Montevideo (A) | Uruguay | 0–0 | Copa Juan Pinto Durán | | — | |
| 330 | 5 August 1981 | Estadio Nacional, Lima (A) | Peru | 2–1 | Friendly | Caszely (2) | — | |
| 331 | 26 August 1981 | Estadio Nacional, Santiago (H) | Brazil | 0–0 | Friendly | | 32,278 | |
| 332 | 23 March 1982 | Santiago (H) | Peru | 2–1 | Friendly | Letelier, M. Á. Neira | 49,800 | |
| 333 | 30 March 1982 | Estadio Nacional, Lima (A) | Peru | 0–1 | Copa del Pacífico | | 38,000 | |
| 334 | 18 May 1982 | Estadio Nacional, Santiago (H) | Romania | 2–3 | Friendly | Gamboa, Caszely | 28,000 | |
| 335 | 21 May 1982 | Estadio Nacional, Santiago (H) | Republic of Ireland | 1–0 | Friendly | Gamboa | 25,000 | |
| 336 | 17 June 1982 | Estadio Carlos Tartiere, Oviedo (N) | Austria | 0–1 | 1982 FIFA World Cup | | 22,500 | |
| 337 | 20 June 1982 | El Molinón, Gijón (N) | West Germany | 1–4 | 1982 FIFA World Cup | Moscoso | 42,000 | |
| 338 | 24 June 1982 | Estadio Carlos Tartiere, Oviedo (N) | Algeria | 2–3 | 1982 FIFA World Cup | M. Á. Neira, Letelier | 16,000 | |
| 339 | 28 April 1983 | Maracanã Stadium, Rio de Janeiro (A) | Brazil | 2–3 | Friendly | Orellana (2) | 53,468 | |
| 340 | 12 May 1983 | Santiago (H) | Argentina | 2–2 | Friendly | Orellana, Dubó | 20,000 | |
| 341 | 23 June 1983 | Buenos Aires (A) | Argentina | 0–1 | Friendly | | 25,000 | |
| 342 | 14 July 1983 | Estadio El Campín, Bogotá (A) | Colombia | 2–2 | Friendly | Aravena, Hurtado | 20,000 | |
| 343 | 19 July 1983 | Estadio Hernando Siles, La Paz (A) | Bolivia | 2–1 | Friendly | Aravena (2) | — | |
| 344 | 21 July 1983 | Estadio Nacional, Lima (A) | Peru | 1–0 | Copa del Pacífico | J. Soto | — | |
| 345 | 24 July 1983 | Asunción (A) | Paraguay | 0–1 | Friendly | | — | |
| 346 | 28 July 1983 | Estadio Nacional, Santiago (H) | Brazil | 0–0 | Friendly | | 20,000 | |
| 347 | 3 August 1983 | Estadio Carlos Dittborn, Arica (H) | Peru | 2–0 | Copa del Pacífico | Letelier (2) | 22,000 | |
| 348 | 17 August 1983 | Antofagasta (H) | Paraguay | 3–2 | Friendly | Aravena, Letelier, Hurtado | 25,000 | |
| 349 | 24 August 1983 | Estadio Carlos Dittborn, Arica (H) | Bolivia | 4–2 | Friendly | Aravena (3), Letelier | — | |
| 350 | 1 September 1983 | Estadio Centenario, Montevideo (A) | Uruguay | 1–2 | 1983 Copa América | Orellana | 30,000 | |
| 351 | 8 September 1983 | Estadio Nacional, Santiago (H) | Venezuela | 5–0 | 1983 Copa América | Arriaza, Dubó, Aravena (2), Espinoza | 20,000 | |
| 352 | 11 September 1983 | Estadio Nacional, Santiago (H) | Uruguay | 2–0 | 1983 Copa América | Dubó, Letelier | 55,000 | |
| 353 | 21 September 1983 | Brígido Iriarte Stadium, Caracas (A) | Venezuela | 0–0 | 1983 Copa América | | 3,000 | |
| 354 | 17 June 1984 | Estadio Nacional, Santiago (H) | England | 0–0 | Friendly | | 9,876 | |
| 355 | 25 July 1984 | Commonwealth Stadium, Edmonton (A) | Canada | 0–0 | Friendly | | 6,137 | |
| 356 | 28 October 1984 | Estadio Nacional, Santiago (H) | Mexico | 1–0 | Friendly | Aravena | — | |
| 357 | 6 February 1985 | Viña del Mar (H) | Paraguay | 1–0 | Friendly | Aravena | 21,000 | |
| 358 | 8 February 1985 | Viña del Mar (H) | Finland | 2–0 | Friendly | Letelier, Aravena | 8,220 | |
| 359 | 21 February 1985 | Estadio Nacional, Santiago (H) | Colombia | 1–1 | Friendly | Letelier | 25,000 | |
| 360 | 24 February 1985 | Santiago (H) | Peru | 1–2 | Friendly | Rubio | 70,000 | |
| 361 | 3 March 1985 | Atahualpa Olympic Stadium, Quito (A) | Ecuador | 1–1 | 1986 FIFA World Cup qualification | Letelier | 56,000 | |
| 362 | 9 March 1985 | Estadio Nacional, Lima (A) | Peru | 1–1 | Friendly | Aravena | — | |
| 363 | 17 March 1985 | Estadio Nacional, Santiago (H) | Ecuador | 6–2 | 1986 FIFA World Cup qualification | Puebla, Caszely (2), Hisis, Aravena (2) | 70,000 | |
| 364 | 24 March 1985 | Estadio Nacional, Santiago (H) | Uruguay | 2–0 | 1986 FIFA World Cup qualification | Rubio, Aravena | 80,000 | |
| 365 | 7 April 1985 | Estadio Centenario, Montevideo (A) | Uruguay | 1–2 | 1986 FIFA World Cup qualification | Aravena | 80,000 | |
| 366 | 14 May 1985 | Buenos Aires (A) | Argentina | 0–2 | Friendly | | — | |
| 367 | 21 May 1985 | Estadio Nacional, Santiago (H) | Brazil | 2–1 | Friendly | Rubio, Caszely | 25,000 | |
| 368 | 8 June 1985 | Estádio Beira-Rio, Porto Alegre (A) | Brazil | 1–3 | Friendly | A. Núñez | 35,351 | |
| 369 | 9 October 1985 | Asunción (A) | Paraguay | 0–0 | Friendly | | — | |
| 370 | 17 October 1985 | Santiago (H) | Uruguay | 1–0 | Friendly | M. Á. Neira | — | |
| 371 | 19 October 1985 | Santiago (H) | Paraguay | 0–0 | Friendly | | 20,000 | |
| 372 | 27 October 1985 | Estadio Nacional, Santiago (H) | Peru | 4–2 | 1986 FIFA World Cup qualification | Aravena (2), Rubio, Hisis | 40,000 | |
| 373 | 3 November 1985 | Estadio Nacional, Lima (A) | Peru | 1–0 | 1986 FIFA World Cup qualification | Aravena | 4,500 | |
| 374 | 10 November 1985 | Estadio Defensores del Chaco, Asunción (A) | Paraguay | 0–3 | 1986 FIFA World Cup qualification | | 35,000 | |
| 375 | 17 November 1985 | Estadio Nacional, Santiago (H) | Paraguay | 2–2 | 1986 FIFA World Cup qualification | Rubio, A. Núñez | 70,000 | |
| 376 | 7 May 1986 | Pinheirão, Curitiba (A) | Brazil | 1–1 | Friendly | Puyol | 65,000 | |
| 377 | 19 June 1987 | Estadio Nacional, Lima (A) | Peru | 3–1 | Friendly | M. Soto, Basay, Zamorano | 3,000 | |
| 378 | 21 June 1987 | Estadio Nacional, Lima (A) | Peru | 0–2 | Friendly | | 5,000 | |
| 379 | 24 June 1987 | Santiago (H) | Peru | 1–0 | Friendly | Hurtado | 8,000 | |
| 380 | 30 June 1987 | Estadio Chateau Carreras, Córdoba (N) | Venezuela | 3–1 | 1987 Copa América | Letelier, Contreras, Salgado | 5,000 | |
| 381 | 3 July 1987 | Estadio Chateau Carreras, Córdoba (N) | Brazil | 4–0 | 1987 Copa América | Basay (2), Letelier (2) | 15,000 | |
| 382 | 8 July 1987 | Estadio Chateau Carreras, Córdoba (N) | Colombia | 2–1 (a.e.t.) | 1987 Copa América | Astengo, Vera | 10,000 | |
| 383 | 12 July 1987 | Estadio Monumental, Buenos Aires (N) | Uruguay | 0–1 | 1987 Copa América | | 35,000 | |
| 384 | 9 December 1987 | Estádio Parque do Sabiá, Uberlândia (A) | Brazil | 1–2 | Friendly | Martínez | 14,604 | |
| 385 | 23 May 1988 | Exhibition Stadium, Toronto (N) | Greece | 0–1 | Stanley Matthews Cup | | 11,106 | |
| 386 | 25 May 1988 | Exhibition Stadium, Toronto (A) | Canada | 0–1 | Stanley Matthews Cup | | 4,178 | |
| 387 | 1 June 1988 | San Diego (A) | United States | 1–1 | Friendly | Hurtado | 9,600 | |
| 388 | 3 June 1988 | San Diego (A) | United States | 3–1 | Friendly | Rojas, Salgado, Hurtado | 6,000 | |
| 389 | 5 June 1988 | Fresno (A) | United States | 3–0 | Friendly | Rubio (2), Hurtado | 4,610 | |
| 390 | 13 September 1988 | La Serena (H) | Ecuador | 3–1 | Friendly | L. Rodríguez, Salgado, Álvarez | 4,000 | |
| 391 | 27 September 1988 | Asunción (A) | Paraguay | 0–2 | Copa Boquerón | | 10,000 | |
| 392 | 29 September 1988 | Asunción (N) | Ecuador | 0–0 | Copa Boquerón | | 15,000 | |
| 393 | 25 October 1988 | Arica (H) | Peru | 2–0 | Copa del Pacífico | Espinoza, H. González | 9,000 | |
| 394 | 1 November 1988 | Santiago (H) | Uruguay | 1–1 | Copa Juan Pinto Durán | Espinoza | 12,500 | |
| 395 | 9 November 1988 | Estadio Centenario, Montevideo (A) | Uruguay | 1–3 | Copa Juan Pinto Durán | Espinoza | 7,000 | |
| 396 | 23 November 1988 | Estadio Nacional, Lima (A) | Peru | 1–1 | Copa del Pacífico | Mardones | 20,000 | |
| 397 | 29 January 1989 | Estadio Monumental, Guayaquil (A) | Ecuador | 0–1 | Friendly | | 10,000 | |
| 398 | 1 February 1989 | Estadio Centenario, Armenia (N) | Peru | 0–0 | Copa Centenario de Armenia | | 10,024 | |
| 399 | 5 February 1989 | Estadio Centenario, Armenia (A) | Colombia | 0–1 | Copa Centenario de Armenia | | 10,367 | |
| 400 | 20 April 1989 | Santiago (H) | Argentina | 1–1 | Friendly | Espinoza | 26,000 | |
| 401 | 5 May 1989 | Los Angeles Memorial Coliseum, Los Angeles (N) | Guatemala | 1–0 | Four Nations Tournament | Martínez | 20,000 | |
| 402 | 7 May 1989 | Los Angeles Memorial Coliseum, Los Angeles (N) | El Salvador | 1–0 | Four Nations Tournament | Ormeño | 6,000 | |
| 403 | 23 May 1989 | Wembley Stadium, London (A) | England | 0–0 | Rous Cup | | 15,628 | |
| 404 | 26 May 1989 | Windsor Park, Belfast (A) | Northern Ireland | 1–0 | Friendly | Astengo | 25,000 | |
| 405 | 30 May 1989 | Hampden Park, Glasgow (A) | Scotland | 0–2 | Rous Cup | | 9,006 | |
| 406 | 3 June 1989 | Cairo (A) | Egypt | 0–2 | Friendly | | 25,000 | |
| 407 | 19 June 1989 | Estadio Centenario, Montevideo (A) | Uruguay | 2–2 | Friendly | Ó. Reyes, P. Pizarro | 20,000 | |
| 408 | 22 June 1989 | Estadio Hernando Siles, La Paz (A) | Bolivia | 1–0 | Friendly | Covarrubias | 20,000 | |
| 409 | 27 June 1989 | Santiago (H) | Bolivia | 2–1 | Friendly | P. Pizarro, Covarrubias | 15,000 | |
| 410 | 2 July 1989 | Estádio Serra Dourada, Goiânia (N) | Argentina | 0–1 | 1989 Copa América | | 40,000 | |
| 411 | 6 July 1989 | Estádio Serra Dourada, Goiânia (N) | Uruguay | 0–3 | 1989 Copa América | | 3,000 | |
| 412 | 8 July 1989 | Estádio Serra Dourada, Goiânia (N) | Bolivia | 5–0 | 1989 Copa América | Olmos, J. Ramírez, Astengo, J. Pizarro, Ó. Reyes | 3,000 | |
| 413 | 10 July 1989 | Estádio Serra Dourada, Goiânia (N) | Ecuador | 2–1 | 1989 Copa América | Olmos, Letelier | 2,000 | |
| 414 | 25 July 1989 | Estadio Carlos Dittborn, Arica (H) | Peru | 2–1 | Friendly | Aravena, Tudor | 10,500 | |
| 415 | 6 August 1989 | Brígido Iriarte Stadium, Caracas (A) | Venezuela | 3–1 | 1990 FIFA World Cup qualification | Aravena (2), Zamorano | 25,000 | |
| 416 | 13 August 1989 | Estadio Nacional, Santiago (H) | Brazil | 1–1 | 1990 FIFA World Cup qualification | Basay | 80,000 | |
| 417 | 27 August 1989 | Estadio Malvinas Argentinas, Mendoza (N) | Venezuela | 5–0 | 1990 FIFA World Cup qualification | Letelier (3), Yáñez, Vera | 20,000 | |
| 418 | 3 September 1989 | Maracanã Stadium, Rio de Janeiro (A) | Brazil | 0–2 w/o | 1990 FIFA World Cup qualification | | 131,156 | |
| 419 | 17 October 1990 | Estadio Nacional, Santiago (H) | Brazil | 0–0 | Friendship Trophy | | 37,000 | |
| 420 | 8 November 1990 | Mangueirão, Belém (A) | Brazil | 0–0 | Friendship Trophy | | 33,664 | |
| 421 | 9 April 1991 | Estadio Luis de la Fuente, Boca del Río (A) | Mexico | 0–1 | Friendly | | 30,000 | |
| 422 | 22 May 1991 | Lansdowne Road, Dublin (A) | Republic of Ireland | 1–1 | Friendly | Estay | 32,000 | |
| 423 | 30 May 1991 | Estadio Santa Laura, Santiago (H) | Uruguay | 2–1 | Friendly | Vega, A. González | 4,500 | |
| 424 | 19 June 1991 | Estadio Modelo, Guayaquil (A) | Ecuador | 1–2 | Friendly | Vera | 25,000 | |
| 425 | 26 June 1991 | Estadio Centenario, Montevideo (A) | Uruguay | 1–2 | Friendly | Rubio | 30,000 | |
| 426 | 30 June 1991 | Estadio Nacional, Santiago (H) | Ecuador | 3–1 | Friendly | Rubio (2), Zamorano | 25,000 | |
| 427 | 6 July 1991 | Estadio Nacional, Santiago (N) | Venezuela | 2–0 | 1991 Copa América | Rubio, Zamorano | 45,000 | |
| 428 | 8 July 1991 | Estadio Municipal, Concepción (N) | Peru | 4–2 | 1991 Copa América | Rubio, Contreras, Zamorano (2) | 50,000 | |
| 429 | 10 July 1991 | Estadio Nacional, Santiago (N) | Argentina | 0–1 | 1991 Copa América | | 75,000 | |
| 430 | 14 July 1991 | Estadio Nacional, Santiago (N) | Paraguay | 4–0 | 1991 Copa América | Rubio, Zamorano, Estay, Vera | 80,000 | |
| 431 | 17 July 1991 | Estadio Nacional, Santiago (N) | Colombia | 1–1 | 1991 Copa América | Zamorano | 65,000 | |
| 432 | 19 July 1991 | Estadio Nacional, Santiago (N) | Argentina | 0–0 | 1991 Copa América | | 65,000 | |
| 433 | 21 July 1991 | Estadio Nacional, Santiago (N) | Brazil | 0–2 | 1991 Copa América | | 30,000 | |
| 434 | 31 March 1993 | Estadio Carlos Dittborn, Arica (H) | Bolivia | 2–1 | Friendly | Estay, Sierra | 9,580 | |
| 435 | 30 May 1993 | Estadio Nacional, Santiago (H) | Colombia | 1–1 | Friendly | Guevara | 5,000 | |
| 436 | 6 June 1993 | Estadio El Campín, Bogotá (A) | Colombia | 0–1 | Friendly | | 35,000 | |
| 437 | 9 June 1993 | Atahualpa Olympic Stadium, Quito (A) | Ecuador | 2–1 | Friendly | J. Pizarro, Barrera | 45,000 | |
| 438 | 13 June 1993 | Estadio Hernando Siles, La Paz (A) | Bolivia | 3–1 | Friendly | Sierra, Figueroa, Castillo | 17,165 | |
| 439 | 18 June 1993 | Estadio Alejandro Serrano Aguilar, Cuenca (N) | Paraguay | 0–1 | 1993 Copa América | | 20,000 | |
| 440 | 21 June 1993 | Estadio Alejandro Serrano Aguilar, Cuenca (N) | Brazil | 3–2 | 1993 Copa América | Sierra, Zambrano (2) | 23,000 | |
| 441 | 24 June 1993 | Estadio Alejandro Serrano Aguilar, Cuenca (N) | Peru | 0–1 | 1993 Copa América | | 20,000 | |
| 442 | 8 September 1993 | Estadio José Rico Pérez, Alicante (A) | Spain | 0–2 | Friendly | | 35,000 | |
| 443 | 22 March 1994 | Stade de Gerland, Lyon (A) | France | 1–3 | Friendly | Zamorano | 30,000 | |
| 444 | 27 March 1994 | King Fahd International Stadium, Riyadh (A) | Saudi Arabia | 2–0 | Friendly | Tudor, Tupper | 20,000 | |
| 445 | 29 March 1994 | King Fahd International Stadium, Riyadh (A) | Saudi Arabia | 2–2 | Friendly | Lepe, Al-Qarni (o.g.) | 18,000 | |
| 446 | 30 April 1994 | University Stadium, Albuquerque (A) | United States | 2–0 | Friendly | Barrera, P. González | 12,000 | |
| 447 | 18 May 1994 | Estadio Nacional, Santiago (H) | Argentina | 3–3 | Friendly | Barrera (2), Salas | 51,193 | |
| 448 | 25 May 1994 | Estadio Nacional, Santiago (H) | Peru | 2–1 | Friendly | Mendoza, Zamorano | 23,832 | |
| 449 | 21 September 1994 | Estadio Nacional, Santiago (H) | Bolivia | 1–2 | Friendly | Tudor | 12,072 | |
| 450 | 16 November 1994 | Estadio Nacional, Santiago (H) | Argentina | 0–3 | Friendly | | 21,842 | |
| 451 | 29 March 1995 | Los Angeles Memorial Coliseum, Los Angeles (N) | Mexico | 2–1 | Friendly | Salas, Zamorano | 59,180 | |
| 452 | 19 April 1994 | Estadio Nacional, Lima (A) | Peru | 0–6 | Friendly | | 15,000 | |
| 453 | 22 April 1994 | Estadio Municipal Germán Becker, Temuco (H) | Iceland | 1–1 | Friendly | Salas | 12,779 | |
| 454 | 25 May 1995 | Commonwealth Stadium, Edmonton (N) | Northern Ireland | 2–1 | 1995 Canada Cup | Valencia, Mardones | 6,124 | |
| 455 | 28 May 1995 | Commonwealth Stadium, Edmonton (A) | Canada | 2–1 | 1995 Canada Cup | Valencia, Salas | 17,047 | |
| 456 | 16 June 1995 | Estadio Regional, Antofagasta (N) | New Zealand | 3–1 | Copa Centenario | M. Ramírez, Fuentes, Ruiz | 28,325 | |
| 457 | 19 June 1995 | Estadio La Portada, La Serena (N) | Paraguay | 0–1 | Copa Centenario | | 14,799 | |
| 458 | 22 June 1995 | Estadio Nacional, Santiago (N) | Turkey | 0–0 | Copa Centenario | | 5,000 | |
| 459 | 8 July 1995 | Estadio Parque Artigas, Paysandú (N) | United States | 1–2 | 1995 Copa América | Rozental | 16,000 | |
| 460 | 11 July 1995 | Estadio Parque Artigas, Paysandú (N) | Argentina | 0–4 | 1995 Copa América | | 16,000 | |
| 461 | 14 July 1995 | Estadio Parque Artigas, Paysandú (N) | Bolivia | 2–2 | 1995 Copa América | Basay (2) | 11,000 | |
| 462 | 11 October 1995 | Estadio Municipal, Concepción (H) | Canada | 2–0 | Friendly | Rozental, Salas | 11,700 | |
| 463 | 4 February 1996 | Estadio Félix Capriles, Cochabamba (A) | Bolivia | 1–1 | Friendly | Margas | 24,130 | |
| 464 | 7 February 1996 | Estadio Sausalito, Viña del Mar (H) | Mexico | 2–1 | Friendly | Goldberg, J. Ramírez | 22,000 | |
| 465 | 14 February 1996 | Estadio Municipal, Coquimbo (H) | Peru | 4–0 | Friendly | Goldberg (2), Salas, Galdemes | 14,000 | |
| 466 | 24 April 1996 | Estadio Regional, Antofagasta (H) | Australia | 3–0 | Friendly | Zamorano (2), Valencia | 30,000 | |
| 467 | 26 May 1996 | Estadio Nacional, Santiago (H) | Bolivia | 2–0 | Friendly | Salas (2) | 24,307 | |
| 468 | 2 June 1996 | Estadio La Carolina, Barinas (A) | Venezuela | 1–1 | 1998 FIFA World Cup qualification | Margas | 15,000 | |
| 469 | 6 July 1996 | Estadio Nacional, Santiago (H) | Ecuador | 4–1 | 1998 FIFA World Cup qualification | Zamorano (2), Estay, Salas | 74,905 | |
| 470 | 26 August 1996 | Estadio Edgardo Baltodano Briceño, Liberia (A) | Costa Rica | 1–1 | Friendly | Salas | 7,000 | |
| 471 | 1 September 1996 | Estadio Metropolitano, Barranquilla (A) | Colombia | 1–4 | 1998 FIFA World Cup qualification | Zamorano | 40,000 | |
| 472 | 9 October 1996 | Estadio Defensores del Chaco, Asunción (A) | Paraguay | 1–2 | 1998 FIFA World Cup qualification | Margas | 45,000 | |
| 473 | 12 November 1996 | Estadio Nacional, Santiago (H) | Uruguay | 1–0 | 1998 FIFA World Cup qualification | Salas | 73,547 | |
| 474 | 15 December 1996 | Estadio Monumental, Buenos Aires (A) | Argentina | 1–1 | 1998 FIFA World Cup qualification | Cornejo | 59,970 | |
| 475 | 4 January 1997 | Estadio Sausalito, Viña del Mar (H) | Armenia | 7–0 | Friendly | Vergara (2), Riveros (2), Cornejo, Castañeda, P. González | 17,726 | |
| 476 | 12 January 1997 | Estadio Nacional, Lima (A) | Peru | 1–2 | 1998 FIFA World Cup qualification | Zamorano | 45,000 | |
| 477 | 12 February 1997 | Estadio Hernando Siles, La Paz (A) | Bolivia | 1–1 | 1998 FIFA World Cup qualification | P. González | 55,000 | |
| 478 | 2 April 1997 | Estádio Nacional Mané Garrincha, Brasília (A) | Brazil | 0–4 | Friendly | | 40,000 | |
| 479 | 29 April 1997 | Estadio Monumental, Santiago (H) | Venezuela | 6–0 | 1998 FIFA World Cup qualification | Zamorano (5), P. Reyes | 42,035 | |
| 480 | 8 June 1997 | Atahualpa Olympic Stadium, Quito (A) | Ecuador | 1–1 | 1998 FIFA World Cup qualification | Salas | 52,000 | |
| 481 | 11 June 1997 | Estadio Félix Capriles, Cochabamba (N) | Paraguay | 0–1 | 1997 Copa América | | 17,000 | |
| 482 | 14 June 1997 | Estadio Félix Capriles, Cochabamba (N) | Argentina | 0–2 | 1997 Copa América | | 9,000 | |
| 483 | 17 June 1997 | Estadio Félix Capriles, Cochabamba (N) | Ecuador | 1–2 | 1997 Copa América | Vergara | 8,000 | |
| 484 | 5 July 1997 | Estadio Nacional, Santiago (H) | Colombia | 4–1 | 1998 FIFA World Cup qualification | Salas (3), Zamorano | 75,617 | |
| 485 | 20 July 1997 | Estadio Nacional, Santiago (H) | Paraguay | 2–1 | 1998 FIFA World Cup qualification | Zamorano (2) | 75,143 | |
| 486 | 20 August 1997 | Estadio Centenario, Montevideo (A) | Uruguay | 0–1 | 1998 FIFA World Cup qualification | | 40,000 | |
| 487 | 10 September 1997 | Estadio Nacional, Santiago (H) | Argentina | 1–2 | 1998 FIFA World Cup qualification | Salas | 73,644 | |
| 488 | 12 October 1997 | Estadio Nacional, Santiago (H) | Peru | 4–0 | 1998 FIFA World Cup qualification | Salas (3), P. Reyes | 74,259 | |
| 489 | 7 November 1997 | Estadio Regional, Antofagasta (H) | Guatemala | 4–1 | Friendly | C. Núñez (3), Margas | 20,000 | |
| 490 | 16 November 1997 | Estadio Nacional, Santiago (H) | Bolivia | 3–0 | 1998 FIFA World Cup qualification | Barrera, Salas, Carreño | 74,777 | |
| 491 | 31 January 1998 | Hong Kong Stadium, Hong Kong (N) | Iran | 1–1 (2–4p) | Carslberg Cup | M. Neira | 31,000 | |
| 492 | 4 February 1998 | Mount Smart Stadium, Auckland (A) | New Zealand | 0–0 | Friendly | | 7,000 | |
| 493 | 7 February 1998 | Olympic Park Stadium, Melbourne (A) | Australia | 1–0 | Friendly | Acuña | 15,000 | |
| 494 | 11 February 1998 | Wembley Stadium, London (A) | England | 2–0 | Friendly | Salas (2) | 75,228 | |
| 495 | 22 April 1998 | Estadio Nacional, Santiago (H) | Colombia | 2–2 | Friendly | Margas, Salas | 34,127 | |
| 496 | 29 April 1998 | Estadio Nacional, Santiago (H) | Lithuania | 1–0 | Friendly | C. Núñez | 7,671 | |
| 497 | 19 May 1998 | Estadio Malvinas Argentinas, Mendoza (N) | Argentina | 0–1 | Friendly | | 43,864 | |
| 498 | 24 May 1998 | Estadio Nacional, Santiago (H) | Uruguay | 2–2 | Friendly | Zamorano, Salas | 61,528 | |
| 499 | 31 May 1998 | Stade Alexandre Tropenas, Montélimar (N) | Tunisia | 3–2 | Friendly | Salas, Sierra, Zamorano | 5,000 | |
| 500 | 4 June 1998 | Stade Pierre de Coubertin, Avignon (N) | Morocco | 1–1 | Friendly | Salas | 10,000 | |
| 501 | 11 June 1998 | Parc Lescure, Bordeaux (N) | Italy | 2–2 | 1998 FIFA World Cup | Salas (2) | 31,800 | |
| 502 | 17 June 1998 | Stade Geoffroy-Guichard, Saint-Étienne (N) | Austria | 1–1 | 1998 FIFA World Cup | Salas | 30,600 | |
| 503 | 23 June 1998 | Stade de la Beaujoire, Nantes (N) | Cameroon | 1–1 | 1998 FIFA World Cup | Sierra | 35,500 | |
| 504 | 27 June 1998 | Parc des Princes, Paris (N) | Brazil | 1–4 | 1998 FIFA World Cup | Salas | 45,500 | |
| 505 | 17 February 1999 | Estadio Mateo Flores, Guatemala City (A) | Guatemala | 1–1 | Friendly | M. Neira | 30,000 | |
| 506 | 21 February 1999 | Lockhart Stadium, Fort Lauderdale (A) | United States | 1–2 | Friendly | Cartes | 14,896 | |
| 507 | 28 April 1999 | Estadio Félix Capriles, Cochabamba (A) | Bolivia | 1–1 | Friendly | D. Pizarro | 30,000 | |
| 508 | 29 May 1999 | Estadio Municipal, Concepción (H) | Costa Rica | 3–0 | Friendly | Acuña, Valencia, P. González | 22,110 | |
| 509 | 20 June 1999 | Estadio Nacional, Santiago (H) | Bolivia | 1–0 | Friendly | Palacios | 30,000 | |
| 510 | 22 June 1999 | Estadio Nacional, Santiago (H) | Ecuador | 0–0 | Friendly | | 23,282 | |
| 511 | 30 June 1999 | Estadio Antonio Oddone Sarubbi, Ciudad del Este (N) | Mexico | 0–1 | 1999 Copa América | | 20,000 | |
| 512 | 3 July 1999 | Estadio Antonio Oddone Sarubbi, Ciudad del Este (N) | Venezuela | 3–0 | 1999 Copa América | Zamorano, Estay, Tortolero (o.g.) | 14,000 | |
| 513 | 6 July 1999 | Estadio Antonio Oddone Sarubbi, Ciudad del Este (N) | Brazil | 0–1 | 1999 Copa América | | 10,000 | |
| 514 | 11 July 1999 | Estadio Feliciano Cáceres, Luque (N) | Colombia | 3–2 | 1999 Copa América | P. Reyes (2), Zamorano | 3,000 | |
| 515 | 13 July 1999 | Estadio Defensores del Chaco, Asunción (N) | Uruguay | 1–1 (3–5p) | 1999 Copa América | Zamorano | 7,000 | |
| 516 | 17 July 1999 | Estadio Defensores del Chaco, Asunción (N) | Mexico | 1–2 | 1999 Copa América | Palacios | 4,000 | |

Notes

1. A: Chile's home match against Venezuela in qualification for the 1990 FIFA World Cup was played at a neutral venue following crowd trouble during their match against Brazil on 13 August 1989.
2. B: Brazil's match against Chile during qualification for the 1990 FIFA World Cup was abandoned after 67 minutes due to misconduct from the Chilean players with the score at 1–0. Brazil were subsequently awarded a technical 2–0 victory and Chile were banned from qualifying for the 1994 FIFA World Cup.

== Record by opponent ==
| Team | Pld | W | D | L | GF | GA | GD | WPCT |
|---|---|---|---|---|---|---|---|---|
| Algeria | 1 | 0 | 0 | 1 | 2 | 3 | −1 | 0.00 |
| Argentina | 15 | 0 | 6 | 9 | 10 | 26 | −16 | 0.00 |
| Armenia | 1 | 1 | 0 | 0 | 7 | 0 | +7 | 100.00 |
| Australia | 2 | 2 | 0 | 0 | 4 | 0 | +4 | 100.00 |
| Austria | 2 | 0 | 1 | 1 | 1 | 2 | −1 | 0.00 |
| Bolivia | 15 | 10 | 4 | 1 | 31 | 13 | +18 | 66.67 |
| Brazil | 19 | 3 | 6 | 10 | 18 | 30 | −12 | 15.79 |
| Cameroon | 1 | 0 | 1 | 0 | 1 | 1 | 0 | 0.00 |
| Canada | 4 | 2 | 1 | 1 | 4 | 2 | +2 | 50.00 |
| Colombia | 13 | 5 | 5 | 3 | 20 | 18 | +2 | 38.46 |
| Costa Rica | 2 | 1 | 1 | 0 | 4 | 1 | +3 | 50.00 |
| Ecuador | 15 | 6 | 5 | 4 | 25 | 15 | +10 | 40.00 |
| Egypt | 1 | 0 | 0 | 1 | 0 | 2 | −2 | 0.00 |
| El Salvador | 1 | 1 | 0 | 0 | 1 | 0 | +1 | 100.00 |
| England | 3 | 1 | 2 | 0 | 2 | 0 | +2 | 33.33 |
| Finland | 1 | 1 | 0 | 0 | 2 | 0 | +2 | 100.00 |
| France | 1 | 0 | 0 | 1 | 1 | 3 | −2 | 0.00 |
| Greece | 1 | 0 | 0 | 1 | 0 | 1 | −1 | 0.00 |
| Guatemala | 3 | 2 | 1 | 0 | 6 | 2 | +4 | 66.67 |
| Iceland | 1 | 0 | 1 | 0 | 1 | 1 | 0 | 0.00 |
| Iran | 1 | 0 | 1 | 0 | 1 | 1 | 0 | 0.00 |
| Italy | 1 | 0 | 1 | 0 | 2 | 2 | 0 | 0.00 |
| Lithuania | 1 | 1 | 0 | 0 | 1 | 0 | +1 | 100.00 |
| Mexico | 6 | 3 | 0 | 3 | 6 | 6 | 0 | 50.00 |
| Morocco | 1 | 0 | 1 | 0 | 1 | 1 | 0 | 0.00 |
| New Zealand | 2 | 1 | 1 | 0 | 3 | 1 | +2 | 50.00 |
| Northern Ireland | 2 | 2 | 0 | 0 | 3 | 1 | +2 | 100.00 |
| Paraguay | 16 | 6 | 3 | 7 | 17 | 13 | +4 | 37.50 |
| Peru | 24 | 15 | 3 | 6 | 41 | 25 | +16 | 62.50 |
| Republic of Ireland | 2 | 1 | 1 | 0 | 2 | 1 | +1 | 50.00 |
| Romania | 1 | 0 | 0 | 1 | 2 | 3 | −1 | 0.00 |
| Saudi Arabia | 2 | 1 | 1 | 0 | 4 | 2 | +2 | 50.00 |
| Scotland | 1 | 0 | 0 | 1 | 0 | 2 | −2 | 0.00 |
| Spain | 2 | 0 | 1 | 1 | 1 | 3 | −2 | 0.00 |
| Tunisia | 1 | 1 | 0 | 0 | 3 | 2 | +1 | 100.00 |
| Turkey | 1 | 0 | 1 | 0 | 1 | 1 | 0 | 0.00 |
| United States | 6 | 3 | 1 | 2 | 11 | 6 | +5 | 50.00 |
| Uruguay | 19 | 5 | 6 | 8 | 19 | 23 | −4 | 26.32 |
| Venezuela | 9 | 7 | 2 | 0 | 28 | 3 | +25 | 77.78 |
| West Germany | 1 | 0 | 0 | 1 | 1 | 4 | −3 | 0.00 |
| Total | 201 | 81 | 57 | 63 | 287 | 220 | +67 | 40.30 |

Source: Results
