= History of the Chile national football team =

The history of the Chilean national football team dates back to the team's formation and its first ever international match in 1910.

== Early years ==
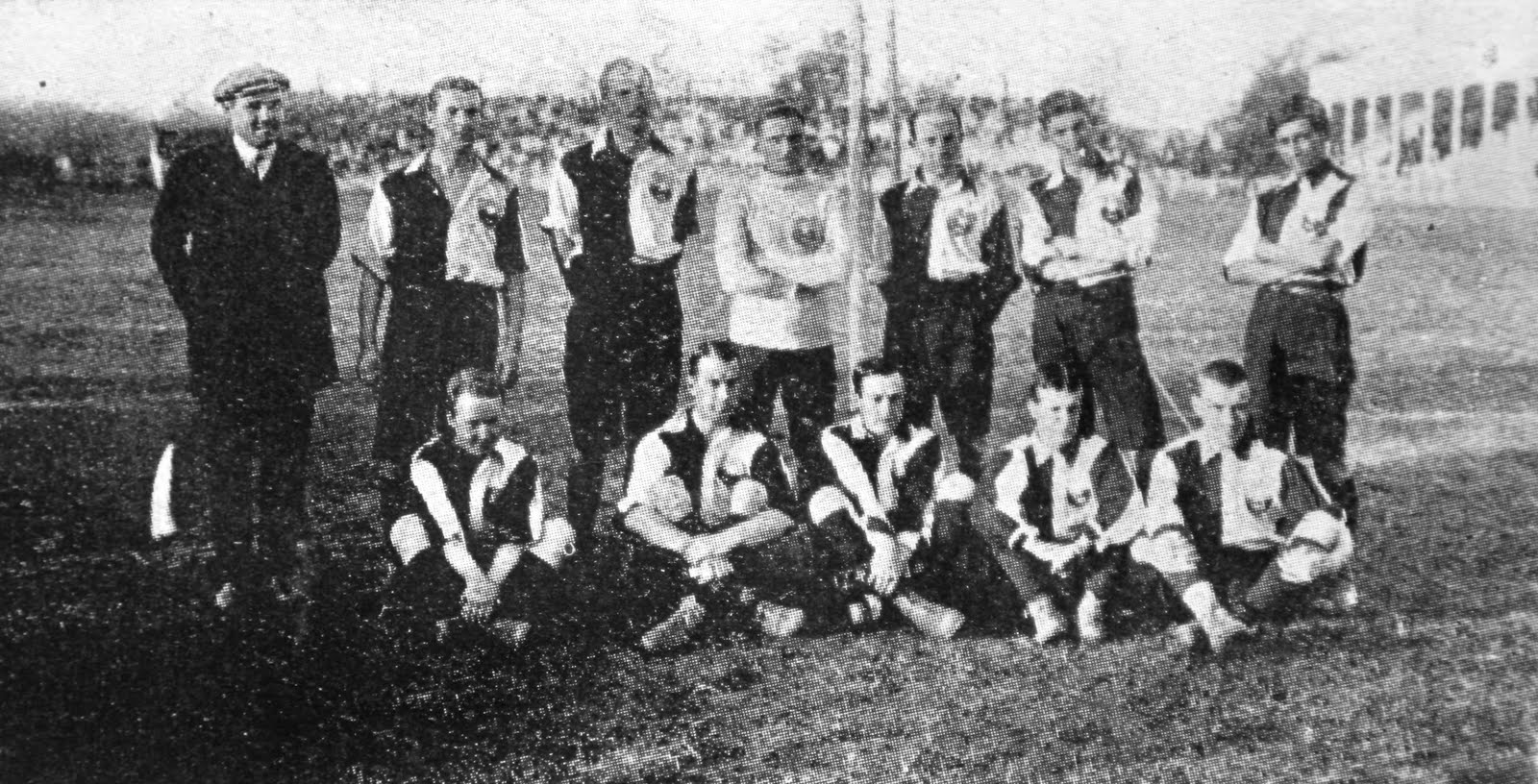
The Chile national football team for the match of June 5, 1910

The Federación de Fútbol de Chile is the second oldest South American federation, having been founded in the port city of Valparaíso on June 19, 1895.

Chile was one of the four founding member nations of CONMEBOL. Together with Argentina, Brazil, and Uruguay, the four competed in the first South American Championship, later to be renamed the Copa América, in 1916. On October 12, 1926, Chile made the first corner-kick goal in Copa América history in a match against Bolivia.

== 1930 World Cup ==
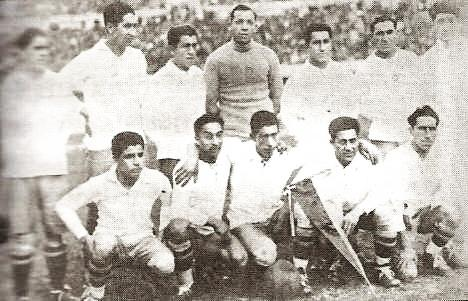
The Chilean national team during the 1930 FIFA World Cup.

At the first ever FIFA World Cup held in Uruguay in 1930, Chile was among the thirteen nations invited to participate in the tournament.

The manager of Chile was the young Hungarian György Orth. Chile was part of Group 1, with Argentina, Mexico, and France. Chile won their first two games, defeating Mexico 3–0 on 16 July, then France 1–0 on 19 July. Sharing the same number of points, Chile and Argentina played a decisive game, on 22 July at the Estadio Centenario in Montevideo, which ended 3–1 in Argentina's favor, and thus Chile failed to qualify for the second round.

== 1950 World Cup ==
The 1950 edition of the FIFA World Cup was held in Brazil. The Chilean manager at the tournament was Alberto Bucciardi, while the team captain was goalkeeper Sergio Livingstone. "La Roja" were in group 2 and Chile lost their first two games against Spain and England, both with a score of 2–0. The last match was played against the United States, which Chile won by a score of 5–2, but it was not enough for Chile to advance to the next round.

== 1962 World Cup ==
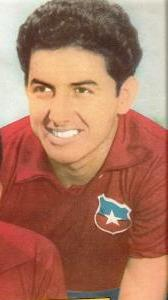
Joint top scorer of the 1962 FIFA World Cup, Leonel Sanchez holds the record for appearances with the Chilean national team

The 1962 World Cup in Chile was the third World Cup hosted on South American soil. In 1960 the Great Chilean earthquake struck the country with the highest magnitude ever recorded: 9.5 on the Richter scale. Despite the disaster, plans went ahead for Chile to be the host nation of this World Cup tournament.

They won their first match, against Switzerland, by 3–1. The second match against Italy, which they won 2–0, became known as the Battle of Santiago. Although only two players were sent off by the English referee Ken Aston, the match saw repeated, deliberate attempts from players on both sides to harm opponents, and the teams needed police protection to leave the field in safety.

Chile defeated European champions USSR, to earn a semi-final against defending World Champions Brazil, but a capacity crowd of 76,600 watched Brazil beat the hosts 4–2. Chile eventually went on to take third place in a 1–0 victory over Yugoslavia in the playoff.

The team is said to have eaten Swiss cheese before beating Switzerland, spaghetti before beating Italy, and drank vodka before beating the USSR. They also drank coffee before the match against Brazil, although they did not win that match. This was Chile's best performance in a World Cup.

== 1966 World Cup ==
England was the stage for the eighth World Cup. It was also the first European World Cup that Chile took part in. Qualification for the 1966 edition ended with a play-off between Ecuador in Lima, Peru on 12 October 1965. Chilean manager, Francisco Hormazabal, resigned shortly before the event and was replaced by Luis Alamos. The match against Ecuador finished 2–1 in Chile's favour, with goals scored by Leonel Sanchez and Ruben Marcos, and the result secured Chile's World Cup berth.

Chile was unable to repeat the same success found in the previous World Cup of 1962. Facing the Soviet Union, Italy, and North Korea, Chile was only able to gain 1 point, with a 1–1 draw against North Korea. Chile scored two goals in the 1966 World Cup, both coming from Ruben Marcos.

== 1974 World Cup ==
Chile qualified for the 1974 World Cup after a controversial play-off with the USSR. Following a drawn first leg in Moscow, the Soviets refused to play the second leg at the Estadio Nacional in Santiago, which had been used as a concentration camp by the military dictatorship of Pinochet. However, FIFA refused to switch the match to a neutral venue, so the Chilean players kicked off on an otherwise empty pitch, and scored into the unguarded USSR net, and because there was no opposition to restart the game, the referee awarded the match to Chile, ensuring they qualified for the 1974 finals.

At the tournament itself, Chile lost their opening game 1–0 to West Germany in Berlin, thanks to a long-range shot from Paul Breitner. Striker Carlos Caszely was sent off in the second half, thus becoming the first player awarded a red card in the tournament's history since the cards went into use.

Guided by coach Luis Alamos, Chile then fought out a 1–1 draw with East Germany, again in Berlin. Martin Hoffmann put East Germany ahead, but Sergio Ahumada equalised with 20 minutes left. Finally, they played out a goalless draw against Australia, which eliminated both teams.

== 1982 World Cup ==
At the 1982 World Cup, the Chileans performed poorly with an aging team in which Carlos Caszely and the 35-year-old central defender Elias Figueroa were still the main men. Guided by coach Luis Santibañez, they lost their first game 1–0 to Austria in Oviedo, Walter Schachner scoring the only goal midway through the first half. Caszely missed a penalty soon afterwards.

Chile were then beaten 4–1 in Gijón by West Germany, Gustavo Moscoso scoring a late consolation goal. Finally, against Algeria, Chile were overrun in the first half and went in at half-time 3–0 behind, but managed to save some face with second-half goals from Miguel Neira and Juan Carlos Letelier.

== Disqualification and banishment from the 1990 and 1994 World Cups ==
The "Roberto Rojas scandal", known in Chile as "El Maracanazo", occurred on 3 September 1989. At a 1990 FIFA World Cup qualifying match at Rio de Janeiro's Maracanã stadium, Brazil led Chile 1–0 and La Roja needed to win. Around the 67-minute mark, Chilean goalkeeper Roberto Rojas fell to the pitch with an apparent injury to his forehead. A firework had been thrown from the stands by a Brazilian fan named Rosenery Mello do Nascimento and was smouldering about a yard away. After Rojas was carried off the pitch, the Chilean players and coaches claimed that conditions were not safe and they refused to return, so the match was abandoned.

However, video footage of the match showed that the firework had not made contact with Rojas. FIFA awarded the win to Brazil on a forfeit, Chile was banned from the qualifiers for the 1994 FIFA World Cup, and Rojas was banned for life, although an amnesty was granted in 2001.

== 1998 World Cup ==
Chile qualified for the 1998 FIFA World Cup having been banned from entering the 1994 tournament. They were drawn in Group B, along with Italy, Cameroon and Austria. With much expected of their strike partnership of Marcelo Salas and Iván Zamorano, Chile drew with Italy in Bordeaux in their opening match, 2–2, with Salas scoring both goals in reply to Christian Vieri's opener, before Roberto Baggio's late penalty equalizer for Italy.

Chile drew their next two matches 1–1. The first was against Austria in St-Étienne. Salas opened the scoring with a disputed goal scored from close range (the Austrians protested his shot never crossed the line), but Austria, as they had in their first match against Cameroon, equalised in the last minute, Ivica Vastic scoring a spectacular long-range effort.

Against Cameroon in Nantes five days later, José Luis Sierra's free-kick gave Chile the lead, but the Africans fought back and equalised with a header from Patrick Mboma.

Italy had been the only team to win in the group, so Chile's unbeaten record took them into the Round of 16 despite not winning a single match in the group phase. In the Round of 16, they played against South American rivals Brazil at the Parc des Princes in Paris. César Sampaio scored twice early on, and a Ronaldo penalty made it 3–0 before half-time. Chile kept fighting, and Salas got his fourth goal of the competition, heading in a rebound after Claudio Taffarel had saved a shot from Zamorano, but Ronaldo scored again quickly and Chile were out of the tournament.

== 2010 World Cup ==
On 10 October 2009, Chile qualified for the 2010 World Cup with a 4–2 away win against Colombia. At the end of the qualification they finished in second place, ahead of Paraguay on goal differential following the latter's defeat to Colombia. They were drawn in Group H with Spain, Switzerland and Honduras. In the first match, Chile defeated Honduras 1–0. The goal was scored on a deflection off of Jean Beausejour in the first half. It was their first win at the World Cup since they beat Yugoslavia for third place at the 1962 FIFA World Cup. In the second game Chile defeated Switzerland, with the decisive goal scored by South African born Mark González. Although beaten 2–1 by Spain in their final group match, Chile finished second in group thus qualifying for the Round of 16, in which they were eliminated from the World Cup by Brazil once again, by a score of 3–0.

== 2014 World Cup ==
On October 7, 2011, Chile started their journey to qualify for the 2014 World Cup. They finished a strong 3rd place in the CONMEBOL World Cup Qualifiers; finishing with a total of 28 points out of a possible 48. Chile were drawn into Group B with Spain, Netherlands, and Australia.

Chile's first game was against Australia on 14 June, which they won 3–1. Their second match was against defending champions Spain. Chile won the match 2–0 to ensure qualification to the knockout stage while eliminating the Spanish from the tournament. Chile's final group game was against the Netherlands to determine who topped the group; Chile lost 2–0 and finished Group B in second.

In the Round of 16, Chile faced Group A winners and tournament hosts Brazil, just as they had four years ago. The match was tied 1–1 after 90 minutes and no further goals were scored in extra time, although Chile struck the woodwork in the dying moments. In the ensuing penalty shoot-out, the Chilean players missed three penalties and fell 2–3 to Brazil, thus being eliminated from the tournament.

== 2015 Copa América ==
Chile were selected to host the 2015 Copa América. In the opening match, they defeated Ecuador 2–0. In their second match, they drew 3–3 against Mexico, with two goals from Vidal, and one from Vargas. They finished the group stage in first place with 7 points after thumping Bolivia 5–0.

Chile went on to defeat Uruguay 1–0 in the quarter-finals and later beat Peru 2–1 in the semi-finals. In the final, they faced Argentina. Chile won the tournament for the first time, defeating Argentina on penalties 4–1 following a 0–0 draw after 120 minutes. Thus, they qualified for the 2017 FIFA Confederations Cup.

== 2019 Copa América ==
Chile were in Group C with Uruguay, Ecuador and Japan. They finished second in the group with 6 points and defeated Colombia in the quarter-finals after a penalty shootout. They lost 3–0 to rivals Peru in the semi-finals, and finished the tournament in fourth after defeat to Argentina in the third place match.
