= El Maracanazo =

Incident during the 1990 FIFA World Cup Conmebol Qualifiers

Brazil v Chile (1989)
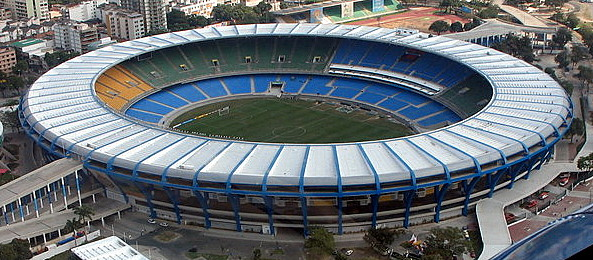
- The Maracanã Stadium, venue of the match
- Event: 1990 FIFA World Cup qualification – South American zone – Group 3
Brazil	Chile
(Brazil)	(Chile)
2	0
- Match abandoned in the 67th minute with Brazil leading 1–0; FIFA awarded Brazil a 2–0 victory Chile were banned from qualifying for the 1994 FIFA World Cup
- Date: 3 September 1989
- Venue: Maracanã Stadium, Rio de Janeiro
- Referee: Juan Carlos Loustau (Argentina)

The Maracanazo of the Chilean team (Spanish: Maracanazo de la selección chilena, also known as Condorazo or Bengalazo) was an incident that happened during the football match between Brazil and Chile at the Maracanã Stadium in Rio de Janeiro on 3 September 1989, in which Chilean goalkeeper Roberto Rojas pretended to be injured by a flare thrown by Brazilian fans. The incident is considered by historians and football experts as one of the most shameful events in world football. The incident resulted in Chile being banned from qualifying for the 1994 World Cup, and ended Rojas' career, as he was banned for life.

== Background ==
For the 1990 FIFA World Cup, the South American Football Confederation (CONMEBOL) received 3.5 berths (including Argentina, who already qualified as title holders). The other teams were grouped into three groups. The two group winners from Groups 1 to 3 with the best records qualified directly for the World Cup, while the lowest-ranked group winner had to play an intercontinental play-off against the winner of Oceania's qualifying. Chile, Venezuela, and Brazil were assigned to Group 3.

In the qualifiers, Chile beat Venezuela 3–1 in Caracas, drew 1–1 with Brazil in Santiago, and beat Venezuela 5–0 in Mendoza, Argentina as FIFA had banned Chile from playing at home after crowd trouble in the match against Brazil. With both teams due to play each other, Chile and Brazil were leading the group with 5 points each, although Brazil was on top in goal difference. This meant that Chile needed to beat Brazil to have a shot of qualifying.

== The match ==
After a goalless first half, Careca of Brazil scored the only goal in the 59th minute. Ten minutes later, Chilean goalkeeper Roberto Rojas fell to the ground, bleeding, pretending to be hurt by a flare thrown by Brazilian fans.

Immediately, Chilean players and officials, led by captain Fernando Astengo, left the pitch in protest, while Argentinian referee Juan Carlos Loustau unsuccessfully tried to convince them to continue with the game. While Rojas was being treated, Patricio Yáñez made an obscene gesture to the Brazilian fans by grabbing his genitals. This gesture was later known in Chile as Pato Yáñez.

The next day, television images and several photos revealed that the flare thrown by Brazilian fans did not hit Rojas, but landed just over a metre away. With that evidence, CONMEBOL managers discredited Rojas' account of an "attack" by Brazilian fans, casting doubt on the origin of his injury, which showed no signs of burning or gunpowder traces but seemed to have been caused by a blade. Brazilian police had meanwhile identified and arrested the fan that threw the flare onto the pitch: a 24-year-old fan named Rosenery Mello do Nascimento, known later as Fogueteira do Maracanã (Firecracker of Maracanã).

As the investigation progressed, it became evident to CONMEBOL managers that Rojas' injury was not caused by an object thrown from the stands. After questioning, Rojas confessed to having cut himself with a razor blade hidden in one of his gloves to fake an attack by Brazilian fans, and that Chilean coach Orlando Aravena had asked Rojas and team doctor Daniel Rodríguez to stay on the pitch to force a scandal, with the purpose of nullifying the result of the game and either forcing a third match on neutral soil or disqualifying Brazil from the competition in favour of Chile.

Ten days after the game, FIFA decided that Rojas should be banned "in perpetuity" from professional football (the ban was lifted in 2001, and Rojas became interim coach of São Paulo, where he worked as goalkeeper coach, for a few months at the end of 2003) and Chile would be barred from the qualifiers for the 1994 FIFA World Cup (which was due to abandoning the match, not Rojas' simulation). In addition, FIFA ruled that the game would be deemed to have been won by Brazil by walkover with an official score of 2–0. In addition, Sergio Stoppel (president of the Football Federation of Chile), Orlando Aravena (team coach), Fernando Astengo (team captain) and Daniel Rodríguez (team's doctor) among others, were all punished by FIFA for their roles.

Over the following days, there were incidents in front of the Brazilian embassy in Chile after Chilean media had reported the version provided by Rojas and Stoppel. Sports magazines (specially Minuto 90) even suggested a conspiracy by João Havelange to secure Brazil's qualification.

=== Match details ===
3 September 1989
19:30

Brazil	2–0 (w/o)	Chile
Careca 59'

Maracanã Stadium, Rio de Janeiro
Referee: Juan Carlos Loustau (Argentina)

Brazil	Chile

GK	1	Cláudio Taffarel
CB	3	Aldair
CB	6	Ricardo Gomes (c)
CB	4	Mauro Galvão	(yellow card) 41'
RM	2	Jorginho
CM	8	Dunga
CM	10	Silas
LM	5	Branco
AM	11	Valdo
CF	9	Careca
CF	7	Bebeto
Manager:
Sebastião Lazaroni

GK	1	Roberto Rojas (c)
RB	18	Patricio Reyes		(substituted off) 63'
CB	11	Fernando Astengo
CB	5	Hugo González
LB	2	Alejandro Hisis	(yellow card) 65'
DM	6	Jaime Pizarro
CM	4	Héctor Puebla	(yellow card) 6'
CM	8	Jaime Vera
RF	14	Patricio Yáñez	(yellow card) 42'
CF	7	Juan Letelier
LF	10	Jorge Aravena
Substitutions:
FW	9	Ivo Basay		(substituted on) 63'
Manager:
Orlando Aravena

Assistant referees:
(Argentina) Carlos Espósito
(Argentina) Francisco Lamolina

== See also ==
- Copa Teixeira
