= 1989 Copa América =

Tournament details
- Host country: Brazil
- Dates: 1–16 July
- Teams: 10 (from 1 confederation)
- Venues: 4 (in 4 host cities)

Final positions
- Champions: Brazil (4th title)
- Runners-up: Uruguay
- Third place: Argentina
- Fourth place: Paraguay

Tournament statistics
- Matches played: 26
- Goals scored: 55 (2.12 per match)
- Attendance: 968,976 (37,268 per match)
- Top scorer: (Brazil) Bebeto (6 goals)
- Best player: (Uruguay) Rubén Sosa

The 1989 Copa América football tournament was hosted by Brazil, from 1 to 16 July. All ten CONMEBOL member nations participated.

Brazil won their fourth Copa América, and first since 1949, by beating Uruguay 1–0 in the final match at the Estádio do Maracanã. This achievement ended a 19-year streak without official titles for the Brazilians. The last one had been in the 1970 World Cup. The final match between Brazil and Uruguay on Maracanã Stadium also marks exactly 39 years, on another 16 July since the FIFA World Cup 1950 Final.

Moreover, Brazil was victorious in the Copa América after a 40-year hiatus, and this achievement ended Brazil's 19-year streak without an official championship since the 1970 World Cup.

The top scorer was Brazilian Bebeto. He scored six times, including three in the final group stage.

== Venues ==
Rio de Janeiro	1989 Copa América is located in Brazil	Goiânia
Estádio do Maracanã	1989 Copa América is located in Brazil	Estádio Serra Dourada
Capacity: 145,000	1989 Copa América is located in Brazil	Capacity: 70,000
Recife	1989 Copa América is located in Brazil	Salvador
Estádio do Arruda	1989 Copa América is located in Brazil	Estádio Fonte Nova
Capacity: 80,000	1989 Copa América is located in Brazil	Capacity: 60,000

== Squads ==
For a complete list of all participating squads, see: 1989 Copa América squads

== First round ==
The tournament was set up in two groups of five teams each. Each team played one match against each of the other teams within the same group. The top two teams in each group advanced to the final stage.

Two points were awarded for a win, one point for a draw, and no points for a loss.

- Tie-breaker
  - If teams finish leveled on points, the following tie-breakers are used:
  1. greater goal difference in all group games;
  2. greater number of goals scored in all group games;
  3. winner of the head-to-head match between the teams in question;
  4. drawing of lots.

=== Group A ===
Team	Pld	W	D	L	GF	GA	GD	Pts
Paraguay	4	3	0	1	9	4	+5	6
Brazil	4	2	2	0	5	1	+4	6
Colombia	4	1	2	1	5	4	+1	4
Peru	4	0	3	1	4	7	−3	3
Venezuela	4	0	1	3	4	11	−7	1

1 July 1989

Paraguay	5–2	Peru
Cañete 38', 84'; Neffa 41'; Mendoza 51'; Del Solar 75' (o.g.)		Hirano 30'; Reynoso 80'

Estádio Fonte Nova, Salvador
Attendance: 5,000
Referee: Juan Carlos Loustau (Argentina)

1 July 1989

Brazil	3–1	Venezuela
Bebeto 2'; Geovani 36' (pen.); Baltazar 57'	Report	Maldonado 63'

Estádio Fonte Nova, Salvador
Attendance: 35,000
Referee: Juan Daniel Cardellino (Uruguay)

3 July 1989

Colombia	4–2	Venezuela
Higuita 36' (pen.); Iguarán 46', 75'; De Ávila 71'		Maldonado 73', 88'

Estádio Fonte Nova, Salvador
Attendance: 26,000
Referee: Rodolfo Martínez Mejia (Honduras)

3 July 1989

Brazil	0–0	Peru
	Report

Estádio Fonte Nova, Salvador
Attendance: 38,200
Referee: Hernán Silva (Chile)

5 July 1989

Peru	1–1	Venezuela
Navarro 30'		Maldonado 29'

Estádio Fonte Nova, Salvador
Attendance: 32,589
Referee: Vincent Mauro (United States)

5 July 1989

Paraguay	1–0	Colombia
Mendoza 51'

Estádio Fonte Nova, Salvador
Attendance: 31,500
Referee: Oscar Ortubé (Bolivia)

7 July 1989

Paraguay	3–0	Venezuela
Neffa 41'; Ferreira 50', 73'

Estádio Fonte Nova, Salvador
Attendance: 33,000
Referee: Rodolfo Martínez Mejia (Honduras)

7 July 1989

Brazil	0–0	Colombia
	Report

Estádio Fonte Nova, Salvador
Attendance: 36,100
Referee: Elias Jácome (Ecuador)

9 July 1989

Colombia	1–1	Peru
Iguarán 32'		Hirano 43'

Estádio do Arruda, Recife
Attendance: 60,000
Referee: Juan Carlos Loustau (Argentina)

9 July 1989

Brazil	2–0	Paraguay
Bebeto 47', 82'	Report

Estádio do Arruda, Recife
Attendance: 76,800
Referee: Vincent Mauro (United States)

=== Group B ===
Team	Pld	W	D	L	GF	GA	GD	Pts
Argentina	4	2	2	0	2	0	+2	6
Uruguay	4	2	0	2	6	2	+4	4
Chile	4	2	0	2	7	5	+2	4
Ecuador	4	1	2	1	2	2	0	4
Bolivia	4	0	2	2	0	8	−8	2

2 July 1989

Ecuador	1–0	Uruguay
Benítez 88'

Estádio Serra Dourada, Goiânia
Attendance: 19,000
Referee: Carlos Maciel (Paraguay)

2 July 1989

Argentina	1–0	Chile
Caniggia 55'

Estádio Serra Dourada, Goiânia
Attendance: 40,000
Referee: Arnaldo Cézar Coelho (Brazil)

4 July 1989

Uruguay	3–0	Bolivia
Ostolaza 30', 60'; Sosa 33'

Estádio Serra Dourada, Goiânia
Attendance: 8,000
Referee: Arnaldo Cézar Coelho (Brazil)

4 July 1989

Argentina	0–0	Ecuador

Estádio Serra Dourada, Goiânia
Attendance: 12,000
Referee: José Ramírez (Peru)

6 July 1989

Ecuador	0–0	Bolivia

Estádio Serra Dourada, Goiânia
Attendance: 3,000
Referee: Jesús Díaz (Colombia)

6 July 1989

Uruguay	3–0	Chile
Sosa 44'; Alzamendi 73'; Francescoli 78'

Estádio Serra Dourada, Goiânia
Attendance: 3,000
Referee: José Ramírez (Peru)

8 July 1989

Chile	5–0	Bolivia
Olmos 9'; Ramírez 10'; Astengo 55'; Pizarro 68' (pen.); Reyes 85'

Estádio Serra Dourada, Goiânia
Attendance: 3,000
Referee: Arnaldo Cézar Coelho (Brazil)

8 July 1989

Argentina	1–0	Uruguay
Caniggia 69'

Estádio Serra Dourada, Goiânia
Attendance: 18,000
Referee: Jesús Díaz (Colombia)

10 July 1989

Chile	2–1	Ecuador
Olmos 44'; Letelier 88'		Avilés 89'

Estádio Serra Dourada, Goiânia
Attendance: 2,000
Referee: Carlos Maciel (Paraguay)

10 July 1989

Argentina	0–0	Bolivia

Estádio Serra Dourada, Goiânia
Attendance: 5,000
Referee: Nelson Rodríguez (Venezuela)

== Final round ==
Team	Pld	W	D	L	GF	GA	GD	Pts
Brazil	3	3	0	0	6	0	+6	6
Uruguay	3	2	0	1	5	1	+4	4
Argentina	3	0	1	2	0	4	−4	1
Paraguay	3	0	1	2	0	6	−6	1

12 July 1989

Uruguay	3–0	Paraguay
Francescoli 28'; Alzamendi 82'; Paz 89'

Estádio do Maracanã, Rio de Janeiro
Attendance: 60,000
Referee: Juan Carlos Loustau (Argentina)

12 July 1989

Brazil	2–0	Argentina
Bebeto 48'; Romário 55'	Report

Estádio do Maracanã, Rio de Janeiro
Attendance: 100,135
Referee: Juan Daniel Cardellino (Uruguay)

14 July 1989

Uruguay	2–0	Argentina
Sosa 38', 81'

Estádio do Maracanã, Rio de Janeiro
Attendance: 45,000
Referee: Arnaldo Cézar Coelho (Brazil)

14 July 1989

Brazil	3–0	Paraguay
Bebeto 16', 52'; Romário 58'	Report

Estádio do Maracanã, Rio de Janeiro
Attendance: 53,909
Referee: Elias Jácome (Ecuador)

16 July 1989

Argentina	0–0	Paraguay

Estádio do Maracanã, Rio de Janeiro
Attendance: 90,000
Referee: Jesús Díaz (Colombia)

16 July 1989

Brazil	1–0	Uruguay
Romário 49'	Report

Estádio do Maracanã, Rio de Janeiro
Attendance: 132,743
Referee: Hernán Silva (Chile)

== Result ==
1989 Copa América champions

Brazil
Fourth title

== Goalscorers ==
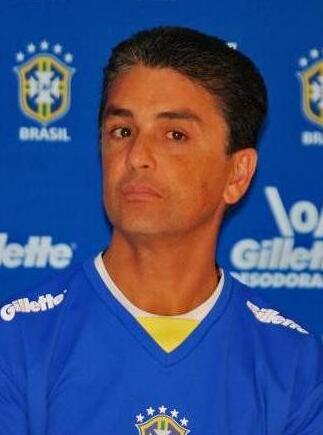
Bebeto, top scorer

With six goals, Bebeto was the top scorer in the tournament. There were 55 goals scored in 26 matches, for an average of 2.12 goals per match.

6 goals

- (Brazil) Bebeto

4 goals

- (Uruguay) Rubén Sosa
- (Venezuela) Carlos Maldonado

3 goals

- (Brazil) Romário
- (Colombia) Arnoldo Iguarán

2 goals

- (Argentina) Claudio Caniggia
- (Chile) Juvenal Olmos
- (Paraguay) Buenaventura Ferreira
- (Paraguay) Adolfino Cañete
- (Paraguay) Alfredo Mendoza
- (Paraguay) Gustavo Neffa
- (Peru) Jorge Hirano
- (Uruguay) Antonio Alzamendi
- (Uruguay) Enzo Francescoli
- (Uruguay) Santiago Ostolaza

1 goal

- (Brazil) Baltazar
- (Brazil) Geovani
- (Chile) Fernando Astengo
- (Chile) Juan Carlos Letelier
- (Chile) Jaime Pizarro
- (Chile) Jaime Ramírez
- (Chile) Óscar Reyes
- (Colombia) Antony de Ávila
- (Colombia) René Higuita
- (Ecuador) Ney Avilés
- (Ecuador) Ermen Benítez
- (Peru) Franco Navarro
- (Peru) Juan Reynoso
- (Uruguay) Rubén Paz

1 own goal

- (Peru) José del Solar (against Paraguay)
