= 1990 FIFA World Cup qualification (CONMEBOL) =

The South American (CONMEBOL) zone of qualification for the 1990 FIFA World Cup saw 9 teams competing for 2 direct places at the finals, with one extra place potentially on offer to the winner of a play-off. CONMEBOL member Argentina qualified automatically as reigning World Cup champions.

== Format ==
Teams were divided into 3 groups of 3 teams each. The teams played against each other on a home-and-away basis. The 2 group winners with the best record qualified directly while the group winner with the worst record advanced to the CONMEBOL / OFC Intercontinental Play-off.

== Draw ==
The draw for the qualifying groups took place in Zürich, Switzerland on 12 December 1987. During the draw teams were drawn from 3 seeded pots into the 3 qualifying groups.

Pot A	Pot B	Pot C
Brazil; Paraguay; Uruguay	Chile; Colombia; Peru	Bolivia; Ecuador; Venezuela

== Groups ==
=== Group 1 ===
	Pld	W	D	L	GF	GA	GD	Pts
Uruguay	4	3	0	1	7	2	+5	6
Bolivia	4	3	0	1	6	5	+1	6
Peru	4	0	0	4	2	8	−6	0

	(Uruguay)	(Bolivia)	(Peru)
URU	–	2–0	2–0
BOL	2–1	–	2–1
PER	0–2	1–2	–

Uruguay qualified with the second-best record among the group winners.

20 August 1989

Bolivia	2–1	Peru
Melgar 45' (pen.); Ramallo 53'		del Solar 43'

Estadio Hernando Siles, La Paz
Attendance: 43,000
Referee: Armando Pérez Hoyos (Colombia)

27 August 1989

Peru	0–2	Uruguay
		Sosa 46'; Alzamendi 69'

Estadio Nacional, Lima
Attendance: 45,000
Referee: Carlos Espósito (Argentina)

3 September 1989

Bolivia	2–1	Uruguay
Domínguez 38' (o.g.); Peña 47'		Sosa 49'

Estadio Hernando Siles, La Paz
Attendance: 52,000
Referee: José Vergara Guerrero (Venezuela)

10 September 1989

Peru	1–2	Bolivia
González 53'		Montaño 45'; Sánchez 77'

Estadio Nacional, Lima
Attendance: 9,500
Referee: Carlos Maciel (Paraguay)

17 September 1989

Uruguay	2–0	Bolivia
Sosa 31'; Francescoli 39'

Estadio Centenario, Montevideo
Attendance: 70,000
Referee: Gastón Castro (Chile)

24 September 1989

Uruguay	2–0	Peru
Sosa 45', 58'

Estadio Centenario, Montevideo
Attendance: 57,000
Referee: José Roberto Wright (Brazil)

=== Group 2 ===
	Pld	W	D	L	GF	GA	GD	Pts
Colombia	4	2	1	1	5	3	+2	5
Paraguay	4	2	0	2	6	7	−1	4
Ecuador	4	1	1	2	4	5	−1	3

	(Colombia)	(Ecuador)	(Paraguay)
COL	–	2–0	2–1
ECU	0–0	–	3–1
PAR	2–1	2–1	–

Colombia advanced to the CONMEBOL / OFC Intercontinental Play-off with the worst record among the group winners.

20 August 1989

Colombia	2–0	Ecuador
Iguarán 32', 72'

Estadio Metropolitano Roberto Meléndez, Barranquilla
Referee: Romualdo Arppi Filho (Brazil)

27 August 1989

Paraguay	2–1	Colombia
Ferreira 48'; Chilavert 90' (pen.)		Iguarán 87'

Estadio Defensores del Chaco, Asunción
Referee: Hernán Silva (Chile)

3 September 1989

Ecuador	0–0	Colombia

Estadio Monumental Isidro Romero Carbo, Guayaquil
Attendance: 55,000
Referee: Ricardo Calabria (Argentina)

10 September 1989

Paraguay	2–1	Ecuador
Cabañas 36'; Ferreira 67'		Avilés 84'

Estadio Defensores del Chaco, Asunción
Attendance: 60,000
Referee: José Ramírez Calle (Peru)

17 September 1989

Colombia	2–1	Paraguay
Iguarán 56'; Hernández 67'		Mendoza 45'

Estadio Metropolitano Roberto Meléndez, Barranquilla
Referee: Juan Daniel Cardellino (Uruguay)

24 September 1989

Ecuador	3–1	Paraguay
Aguinaga 26'; Marsetti 72'; Avilés 82'		Neffa 18'

Estadio Monumental Isidro Romero Carbo, Guayaquil
Attendance: 18,000
Referee: Arnaldo Cézar Coelho (Brazil)

=== Group 3 ===
	Pld	W	D	L	GF	GA	GD	Pts
Brazil	4	3	1	0	13	1	+12	7
Chile	4	2	1	1	9	4	+5	5
Venezuela	4	0	0	4	1	18	−17	0

	(Brazil)	(Chile)	(Venezuela)
BRA	–	2–0	6–0
CHI	1–1	–	5–0
VEN	0–4	1–3	–

Brazil qualified with the best record among the group winners.

30 July 1989

Venezuela	0–4	Brazil
		Branco 5'; Romário 65'; Bebeto 79', 81'

Estadio Brígido Iriarte, Caracas
Referee: René Ortubé (Bolivia)

6 August 1989

Venezuela	1–3	Chile
Fernández 65'		Aravena 5', 33'; Zamorano 71'

Estadio Brígido Iriarte, Caracas
Attendance: 13,000
Referee: Antenor Montalván Miranda (Peru)

13 August 1989

Chile	1–1	Brazil
Basay 81'		González 56' (o.g.)

Estadio Nacional, Santiago
Attendance: 60,697
Referee: Jesús Díaz Palacios (Colombia)

20 August 1989

Brazil	6–0	Venezuela
Careca 10', 17', 80', 86'; Silas 37'; Acosta 39' (o.g.)

Estádio do Morumbi, São Paulo
Attendance: 106,462
Referee: Ernesto Filippi (Uruguay)

27 August 1989

Chile	5–0	Venezuela
Letellier 14', 34', 69'; Yáñez 44'; Vera 84'

Estadio Malvinas Argentinas, Mendoza (Note: The Chile–Venezuela match was played on neutral ground in Argentina instead of in Chile because Chile was penalised for rioting during the Chile vs Brazil match.)
Attendance: 19,000
Referee: Elías Jácome Guerrero (Ecuador)

3 September 1989

Brazil	2–0 (Note: The match was abandoned in the 67th minute with Brazil leading 1–0 after Chile walked off the field when a firecracker thrown from the crowd supposedly hit goalkeeper Roberto Rojas in the head, leaving him bloodied and having to be carried from the pitch on a stretcher; a subsequent FIFA investigation found that Rojas's injury was self-inflicted, using a razor blade concealed in his glove. On 13 September, the match was awarded 2–0 to Brazil, and Chile were banned from qualifying for the next World Cup. Rojas was given a lifetime ban from competitive football (lifted in 2001), as was Chile manager Orlando Aravena, vice-captain Fernando Astengo and team doctor Daniel Rodriguez.)	Chile
Careca 49'

Estádio do Maracanã, Rio de Janeiro
Attendance: 141,072
Referee: Juan Carlos Loustau (Argentina)

=== Ranking of first-placed teams ===
The two group winners with the best records qualify directly for the 1990 FIFA World Cup while the group winner with the worst record entered the CONMEBOL–OFC play-offs.

Pos	Grp	Team	Pld	W	D	L	GF	GA	GD	Pts	Qualification
1	3	Brazil	4	3	1	0	13	1	+12	7	Qualification to 1990 FIFA World Cup
2	1	Uruguay	4	3	0	1	7	2	+5	6	Qualification to 1990 FIFA World Cup
3	2	Colombia	4	2	1	1	5	3	+2	5	Advance to 1990 FIFA World Cup qualification (CONMEBOL–OFC play-off)

== Inter-confederation play-offs ==
The winner of this play-off qualified for the 1990 FIFA World Cup.

Team 1	Agg.	Team 2	1st leg	2nd leg
Colombia	1–0	Israel	1–0	0–0

== Qualified teams ==
The following four teams from CONMEBOL qualified for the final tournament.

Team	Qualified as	Qualified on	Previous appearances in FIFA World Cup^{1}
Argentina	Defending champions	29 June 1986	9 (1930, 1934, 1958, 1962, 1966, 1974, **1978**, 1982, **1986**)
Uruguay	Group 1 winners with the second-best record	24 September 1989	8 (**1930**, **1950**, 1954, 1962, 1966, 1970, 1974, 1986)
Brazil	Group 3 winners with the best record	13 September 1989	13 (1930, 1934, 1938, 1950, 1954, **1958**, **1962**, 1966, **1970**, 1974, 1978, 1982, 1986)
Colombia	CONMEBOL-OFC playoff winners	30 October 1989	1 (1962)

^{1} Bold indicates champions for that year. Italic indicates hosts for that year.

== Goalscorers ==
5 goals

- (Brazil) Careca
- (Uruguay) Rubén Sosa

4 goals

- (Colombia) Arnoldo Iguarán

3 goals

- (Chile) Juan Carlos Letelier

2 goals

- (Brazil) Bebeto
- (Chile) Jorge Aravena
- (Ecuador) Raúl Aviles
- (Paraguay) Javier Ferreira

1 goal

- (Bolivia) José Milton Melgar
- (Bolivia) Tito Montaño
- (Bolivia) Álvaro Peña
- (Bolivia) William Ramallo
- (Bolivia) Erwin Sánchez
- (Brazil) Branco
- (Brazil) Romário
- (Brazil) Paulo Silas
- (Chile) Ivo Basay
- (Chile) Jaime Vera
- (Chile) Patricio Yáñez
- (Chile) Iván Zamorano
- (Colombia) Rubén Darío Hernández
- (Colombia) Albeiro Usuriaga
- (Ecuador) Álex Aguinaga
- (Ecuador) Pietro Marsetti
- (Paraguay) Roberto Cabañas
- (Paraguay) José Luis Chilavert
- (Paraguay) Alfredo Mendoza
- (Paraguay) Gustavo Neffa
- (Peru) Andrés Aurelio González
- (Peru) José del Solar
- (Uruguay) Antonio Alzamendi
- (Uruguay) Enzo Francescoli
- (Venezuela) Ildemaro Fernández

1 own goal

- (Chile) Hugo González (playing against Brazil)
- (Uruguay) Alfonso Domínguez (playing against Bolivia)
- (Venezuela) Pedro Acosta (playing against Brazil)
