= 1988 Copa Digeder =

Tournament details
- Country: Chile
- Teams: 40

Final positions
- Champions: Colo-Colo
- Runners-up: Unión Española
- Semifinalists: Deportes Iquique; Universidad Catolica

Tournament statistics
- Top goal scorer: Ramón Pérez (Palestino) 17 goals

The 1988 Copa Digeder was the 18th edition of the Chilean Cup tournament. The competition started on March 19, 1988, and concluded on July 6, 1988. first and second-level teams took part in the tournament. Colo-Colo won the competition for their sixth time, beating Unión Española 1–0 in the final. The points system in the first round awarded 3 points for a win. In the event of a tie, each team was awarded 1 point, and an additional point was awarded to the winner of a penalty shoot-out.

== Calendar ==
Round	Date
Group Round	19 March 1988; 18 June 1988
Quarterfinals	22–26 June 1988
Semi-finals	29 June; 3 July 1988
Final	6 July 1988

== Group Round ==
Key to colours in group tables
Teams that progressed to the Quarterfinals

=== Group 1 ===
	AUDI	CAND	COLO	EVER	MAGA	PALE	SLUI	ULCA	UCHI	SWAN
Audax I.		3–3 (2-3 p)	1–2	1–4	2–0	0–1	2–0	1–1	0–4	2–1
Cobreandino	2–0		2–2 (3-4 p)	1–2	1–2	2–2 (3-5 p)	2–1	4–0	1–5	0–2
Colo-Colo	6–1	1–0		2–2 (4-5 p)	5–2	2–2 (4-5 p)	4–0	2–1	3–0	0–1
Everton	4–1	2–1	2–3		3–0	3–1	1–1 (2-4 p)	0–0 (1-3 p)	0–0 (3-4 p)	3–4
Magallanes	0–0 (5-4 p)	2–2 (3-5 p)	1–3	2–0		1–4	1–0	2–0	0–3	2–3
Palestino	0–1	4–0	1–2	3–0	1–1 (3-4 p)		3–0	5–2	0–0 (7-8 p)	1–2
San Luis	0–0 (5-6 p)	1–2	0–2	3–1	3–0	0–0 (3-4 p)		7–0	0–2	1–0
U. La Calera	1–0	0–0 (5-4 p)	0–3	0–1	1–0	0–1	2–0		2–1	0–1
U. de Chile	1–2	3–2	2–1	1–2	3–1	3–1	4–0	6–0		5–0
S. Wanderers	2–1	2–3	3–0	0–0 (4-3 p)	1–1 (3-4 p)	1–2	1–1 (6-7 p)	0–2	1–3	

Rank	Team	Points
1	Universidad de Chile	40 (+30)
2	Colo-Colo	40 (+22)
3	Palestino	32
4	Everton	30
5	Santiago Wanderers	28
6	Cobreandino	22
7	Audax Italiano	21
8	Unión La Calera	20
9	Magallanes	19
10	San Luis	18

=== Group 2 ===
	DANT	DARI	RATA	CLOA	CSAL	COQU	DIQU	DLSE	DOVA	USFE
D. Antofagasta		1–0	2–1	2–0	2–2 (4-3 p)	1–1 (8-7 p)	0–1	1–3	0–1	3–0
D. Arica	1–0		1–1 (3-4 p)	2–1	3–0	2–1	2–1	0–0 (4-2 p)	1–0	3–0
R. Atacama	0–0 (4-3 p)	1–0		1–0	1–0	6–0	4–2	2–2 (3-2 p)	2–1	4–0
Cobreloa	3–0	2–2 (4-3 p)	1–1 (3-2 p)		2–2 (7-8 p)	5–0	0–1	3–0	3–0	1–1 (2-3 p)
Cobresal	5–1	4–0	3–1	1–0		6–0	3–2	4–0	2–0	2–0
Coquimbo U.	3–0	2–0	1–1 (4-5 p)	0–0 (4-2 p)	2–3		2–2 (2-3 p)	2–0	2–2 (1-4 p)	1–1 (4-2 p)
D. Iquique	3–0	1–1 (4-2 p)	7–3	0–0 (4-3 p)	0–0 (5-3 p)	1–1 (4-3 p)		1–1 (5-3 p)	5–0	3–1
D. La Serena	1–0	0–0 (2-3 p)	2–2 (4-2 p)	2–0	0–3	0–0 (4-5 p)	0–0 (8-7 p)		2–0	1–1 (5-4 p)
D. Ovalle	1–3	1–0	1–4	2–1	4–0	2–1	0–1	1–2		2–2 (6-7 p)
U. San Felipe	2–2 (3-2 p)	0–1	2–2 (4-3 p)	2–1	0–5	3–0	1–2	1–1 (3-1 p)	0–0 (2-3 p)	

Rank	Team	Points
1	Cobresal	40
2	Deportes Iquique	37
3	Regional Atacama	35
4	Deportes Arica	31
5	Deportes La Serena	27
6	Deportes Antofagasta	21
7	Cobreloa	20 (+4)
8	Deportes Ovalle	20 (-12)
9	Coquimbo Unido	20 (-17)
10	Unión San Felipe	19

=== Group 3 ===
	DCOL	CURI	GVEL	DLIN	ÑUBL	OHIG	RANG	UESP	UCAT	DVAL
D. Colchagua		2–1	1–1 (5-4 p)	3–1	2–3	0–3	0–0 (2-4 p)	2–3	0–0 (5-3 p)	1–0
Curicó U.	4–2		0–1	2–2 (6-5 p)	2–0	1–2	0–1	2–2 (2-3 p)	1–2	2–3
G. Velásquez	3–1	0–0 (2-4 p)		1–5	2–0	2–0	0–0 (3-5 p)	2–3	1–2	0–0 (2-4 p)
D. Linares	0–0 (4-3 p)	0–0 (4-2 p)	0–0 (4-3 p)		2–1	2–1	1–2	0–0 (4-2 p)	0–1	2–1
Ñublense	2–1	2–0	3–1	1–1 (1-2 p)		0–0 (4-5 p)	1–1 (5-6 p)	0–1	1–2	1–0
O'Higgins	3–1	4–0	2–1	7–1	1–2		2–1	1–1 (4-3 p)	2–4	1–0
Rangers	0–0 (1-4 p)	3–2	4–1	1–2	2–1	1–1 (1-3 p)		3–4	1–0	3–4
U. Española	3–1	1–0	3–0	2–2 (4-5 p)	3–2	1–0	3–2		1–2	2–0
U. Católica	2–0	2–3	3–0	7–1	3–1	3–5	2–0	1–1 (5-4 p)		3–1
D. Valdivia	1–0	1–1 (3-4 p)	1–1 (3-1 p)	5–2	0–1	2–0	2–1	0–0 (1-3 p)	0–0 (4-2 p)	

Rank	Team	Points
1	Unión Española	41
2	Universidad Católica	40
3	O'Higgins	33
4	Deportes Linares	28
5	Rangers	26 (GF:26)
6	Deportes Valdivia	26 (GF:21)
7	Ñublense	24
8	General Velásquez	19
9	Curicó Unido	17
10	Deportes Colchagua	16

=== Group 4 ===
	DCON	FVIA	HUAC	IBER	LSCH	MALL	NAVA	POSO	DPMO	DTEM
D. Concepción		3–0	0–0 (2-4 p)	2–2 (7-6 p)	0–1	3–0	5–1	3–0	3–2	0–2
Fernández Vial	1–0		0–0 (3-0 p)	1–1 (2-4 p)	2–1	3–0	2–1	0–0 (8-9 p)	3–1	7–1
Huachipato	2–0	0–0 (5-4 p)		2–0	1–1 (2-4 p)	5–0	2–1	1–2	2–1	2–0
Iberia B.B.	1–1 (3-4 p)	1–5	2–2 (4-2 p)		2–1	2–1	1–0	2–2 (5-4 p)	4–1	0–0 (3-5 p)
Lota S.	2–1	1–1 (7-6 p)	1–1 (2-4 p)	1–2		2–0	3–0	2–0	1–1 (4-5 p)	0–0 (4-5 p)
Malleco U.	0–2	1–2	0–0 (5-6 p)	2–2 (2-4 p)	0–1		1–1 (4-2 p)	1–1 (4-2 p)	2–1	0–0 (2-4 p)
Naval	3–2	1–2	1–1 (3-4 p)	0–1	1–3	0–0 (3-4 p)		1–0	3–1	2–1
P. Osorno	1–1 (3-4 p)	1–1 (4-2 p)	0–0 (4-5 p)	1–1 (6-5 p)	3–2	3–1	2–1		2–0	1–1 (- p)
D. P. Montt	3–1	1–0	1–0	1–1 (3-4 p)	0–0 (4-2 p)	1–0	1–1 (3-2 p)	0–1		0–1
D. Temuco	2–1	1–0	1–3	1–1 (6-5 p)	2–0	1–0	0–1	2–0	3–2	

Rank	Team	Points
1	Huachipato	36
2	Fernández Vial	34
3	Deportes Temuco	33
4	Iberia Bío Bío	32
5	Provincial Osorno	30
6	Lota Schwager	29
7	Deportes Concepción	25
8	Naval	19
9	Deportes Puerto Montt	18
10	Malleco Unido	14

== Quarter-finals ==
Teams			Scores		Tie-breakers
Team #1	Points	Team #2	1st leg	2nd leg	
Cobresal	3:3	Colo-Colo	2–1	0–5	2–6 (g.d.)
Universidad de Chile	0:6	Deportes Iquique	1–2	0–1	–
Unión Española	3:3	Fernández Vial	1–0	0–1	5–3 ( pen.)
Huachipato	0:6	Universidad Católica	1–2	0–2	–

== Semifinals ==
June 29, 1988

Unión Española	2 – 1	Deportes Iquique
J. Rojas 57'; Matuszyczk 80'		70' Oré

Estadio Nacional, Santiago
Attendance: 55,979
Referee: J. Massardo

June 29, 1988

Universidad Católica	1 – 1 (4–2 p)	Colo-Colo
Espinoza 28'		61' González

Estadio Nacional, Santiago
Attendance: 55,979
Referee: E. Marín

July 3, 1988

Deportes Iquique	0 – 1	Unión Española
		60' Matuszyczk

Estadio Municipal, Iquique
Attendance: 11,684
Referee: G. Castro

July 3, 1988

Colo-Colo	1 – 0	Universidad Católica
González 35'

Estadio Nacional, Santiago
Attendance: 47,641
Referee: V. Ojeda

== Final ==
July 6, 1988

Colo-Colo	1 – 0 (a.e.t.)	Unión Española
Gutiérrez 97'

Estadio Nacional, Santiago
Attendance: 38,118
Referee: S. Imperatore

== Top goalscorer ==
- Ramón Pérez (Palestino) 17 goals

== See also ==
- 1988 Campeonato Nacional
- Segunda División

== Sources ==
- Revista Minuto 90, (Santiago, Chile) March–July 1988 (scores & information)
- Revista Triunfo, (Santiago, Chile) March–July 1988 (scores & information)
