= Carlos Maldonado (footballer) =

Venezuelan footballer (born 1963)

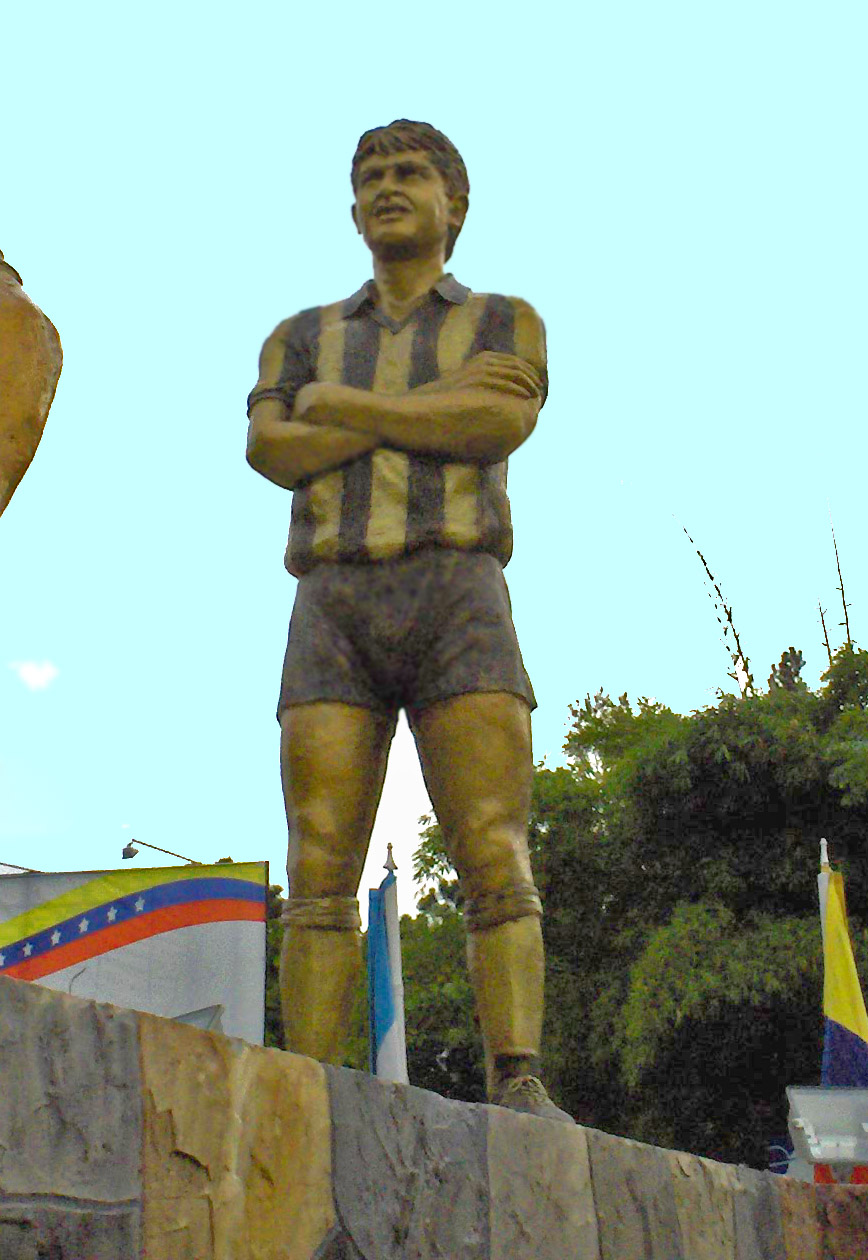

Personal information
- Full name: Carlos Fabián Maldonado Bineiro
- Date of birth: 30 July 1963 (age 63)
- Place of birth: Montevideo, Uruguay
- Position: Central midfielder

Senior career*
Years	Team	Apps	(Gls)
1981–1982	Deportivo Portugués		
1982–1984	Atlético San Cristóbal		
1984–1987	Atlético Táchira		
1987–1988	Deportivo Armenio		
1988–1990	Atlético Táchira		
1990	Santa Fe		
1991–1992	Atlético Táchira		
1992	Fluminense		
1993–1994	Caracas		
1994–1995	Atlético San Cristóbal		

International career
1985–1991	Venezuela	20	(4)

Managerial career
- 2001–2003: Nacional Táchira
- 2004: Mineros de Guayana
- 2004–2006: Maracaibo
- 2007–2010: Deportivo Táchira
- 2010–2012: Mineros
- 2013: Aragua
- 2016: Deportivo Táchira
- 2017–2018: Zulia
- 2018–2021: Academia Puerto Cabello
- * Club domestic league appearances and goals

Carlos Fabián Maldonado Bineiro (born 30 July 1963) is a Uruguayan-born Venezuelan football manager and former player who played as a central midfielder.

Maldonado was nicknamed "Carlitos" during his playing career.

== Club career ==
Born in Montevideo, Uruguay, Maldonado played professional football in Venezuela, Argentina, Brazil and Colombia.

== International career ==
He obtained a total number of 20 caps for the Venezuela national football team, scoring four goals. All his goals came at the 1989 Copa América.

International Goals
#	Date	Venue	Opponent	Score	Result	Competition
1.	01/07/1989	Salvador, Brazil	Brazil	3–1	3–1	Copa América
2.	03/07/1989	Salvador, Brazil	Colombia	1–3	2–4	Copa América
3.	03/07/1989	Salvador, Brazil	Colombia	2–4	2–4	Copa América
4.	05/07/1989	Salvador, Brazil	Peru	1–0	1–1	Copa América

== Personal life ==
He is the father of Giancarlo Maldonado, who also started a professional football career.
