= Fernando Vergara =

Chilean footballer and manager (born 1970)

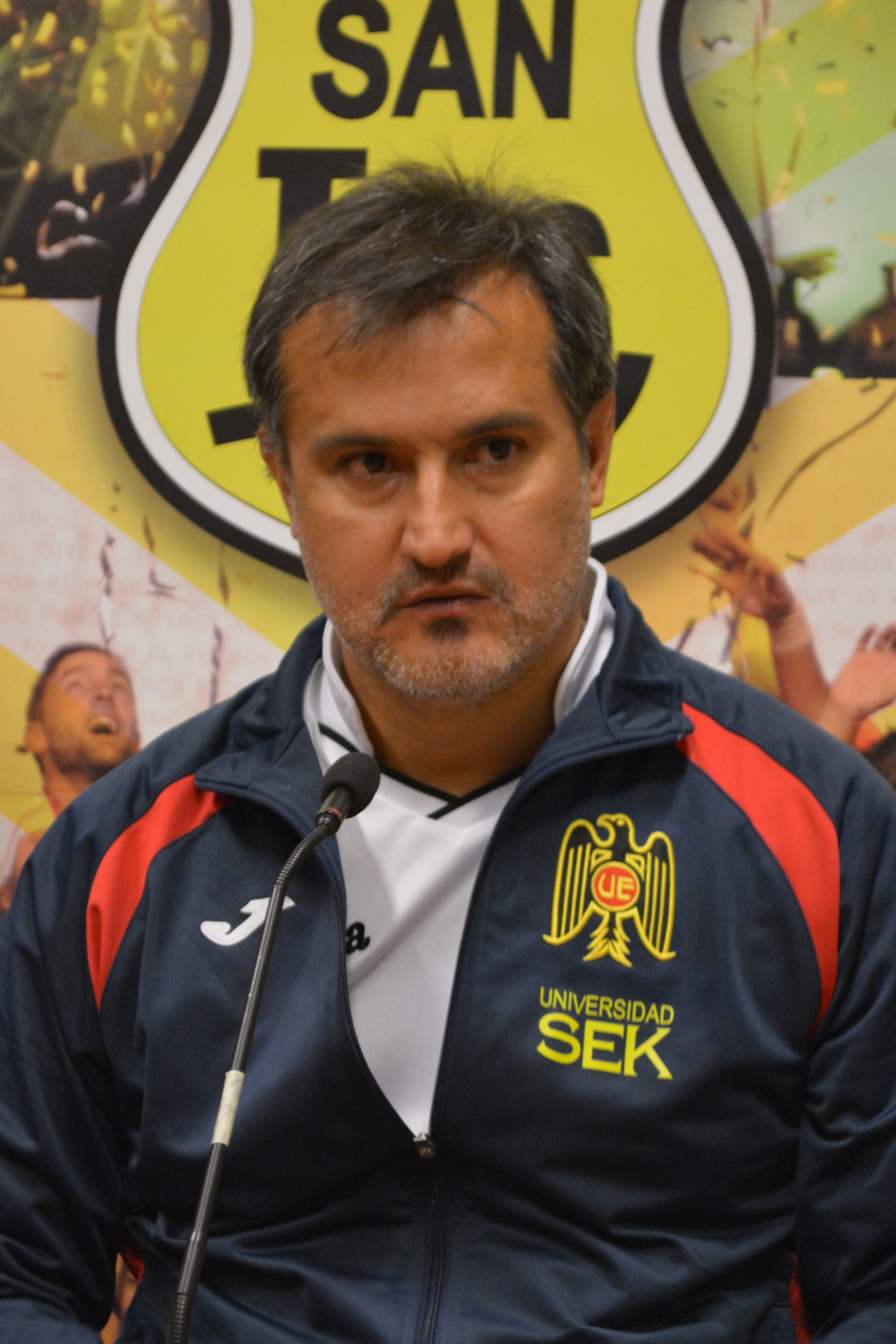
- Vergara with Unión Española in 2015

Personal information
- Full name: Luis Fernando Vergara Meyland
- Date of birth: 13 May 1970 (age 56)
- Place of birth: Santiago, Chile
- Height: 1.82 m (6 ft 0 in)
- Position: Forward

Team information
- Current team: Atlético Colina (manager)

Senior career*
Years	Team	Apps	(Gls)
1988–1989	Audax Italiano		
1990	Brüttisellen		
1991	Universidad de Chile		
1992	Fernández Vial	26	(8)
1993	Colo-Colo		
1994	Deportes Antofagasta	21	(4)
1995–1998	Colo-Colo		
1998–1999	Rayo Vallecano		
1999	Colo-Colo		
2001	Universitario		
2002	Unión Española		

International career
1996–1997	Chile	6	(3)

Managerial career
- 2005: Barnechea
- 2005–2006: Instituto Nacional
- 2007: Magallanes
- 2008–2009: Huachipato
- 2011: Deportes La Serena
- 2011–2012: Deportes Iquique
- 2014: Deportes Temuco
- 2014: Cobreloa
- 2015: San Marcos
- 2015–2016: Unión Española
- 2016–2017: Deportes Antofagasta
- 2018–2019: Deportes Puerto Montt
- 2020–2021: Magallanes
- 2021–2022: Universidad de Concepción
- 2026–: Atlético Colina
- * Club domestic league appearances and goals

Luis Fernando Vergara Meyland (born 13 May 1970), known as Fernando Vergara, is a Chilean football coach and former player. Nicknamed El Zamorano de los Pobres during his career, he played as a forward. He is the current manager of Atlético Colina.

== Playing career ==
A product of Audax Italiano youth system, in 1990 he played for Swiss side FC Brüttisellen-Dietlikon before returning to Chile and joining Universidad de Chile.

In 1997, he had a trial with English Premier League club Crystal Palace and then had talks with Everton, but nothing came of either of these approaches and Vergara never played a competitive game in England.

Vergara earned six caps for the Chile national team from 1996 to 1997, during which he scored three goals.

== Managerial career ==
Following his playing career, Vergara became a football manager and led Huachipato FC to the quarter-finals in the 2008 Torneo Clausura.

In 2021–22, he led Universidad de Concepción in the Primera B de Chile.

Vergara has led the technical staff of the Colo-Colo academy based in Providencia commune.

On 24 August 2026, Vergara was appointed as the manager of Atlético Colina in the Segunda División Profesional de Chile.

== Other works ==
From 2009 to 2010 Vergara worked as a football commentator for the channel Canal del Fútbol.

He has served as coach for a football academy which helps children to play in the United States. He also has a sporting events production company.

Since March 2024, he performs as co-host of the program Fútbol y Parrilla (Football and Grill) on YouTube alongside the former footballer Ian Mac-Niven.

== Career statistics ==
#	Date	Venue	Opponent	Score	Result	Competition
1.	4 January 1997	Estadio Sausalito, Viña del Mar, Chile	Armenia	7–0	Win	Friendly
2.	4 January 1997	Estadio Sausalito, Viña del Mar, Chile	Armenia	7–0	Win	Friendly
3.	17 June 1997	Estadio Félix Capriles, Cochabamba, Bolivia	Ecuador	2–1	Loss	1997 Copa América
Correct as of 7 October 2015

== Honours ==
=== Player ===
Colo-Colo

- Primera División de Chile: 1993, 1996, 1997, 1998
