= Rosenery Mello do Nascimento =

Brazilian model

Rosenery Mello do Nascimento (Rio de Janeiro, 1965 – Rio de Janeiro, 4 June 2011) was a Brazilian celebrity and model also known as "Fogueteira do Maracanã" ("Maracanã Firecracker-Thrower"). During a World Cup qualifier in 1989 between the national teams of Brazil and Chile at Maracanã Stadium, Mello threw a firework, which landed about a yard away from Chilean goalkeeper Roberto Rojas. Rojas then deliberately cut himself with a razor hidden in his glove in a failed attempt to have the match awarded to Chile. The event became known as El Maracanazo.

In November 1989, Mello was on the cover of men's magazine Playboy. She died of a brain aneurysm on 4 June 2011 in Rio de Janeiro.
