= Rous Cup =

Former association football event 1985–1989

- Organiser(s): FA; SFA
- Founded: 1985
- Abolished: 1989; 37 years ago
- Region: Great Britain
- Teams: 1985–86: 2; 1987–89: 3
- Related competitions: Umbro Cup
- Last champions: England (1989)
- Most championships: England (3 titles)

The Rous Cup was a short-lived football competition hosted in the second half of the 1980s, contested between England, Scotland and, in later years, a guest team from South America. It was named after Sir Stanley Rous, an English football administrator.

== Overview ==
The Rous Cup arose from the ashes of the British Home Championship, which had been discontinued in 1984. Initially, the competition (which was named after Sir Stanley Rous, a former secretary of The Football Association and president of FIFA) was merely a replacement for the annual England v Scotland match that had been lost due to the end of the British Home Championship. Thus, the competition consisted of just one game between England and Scotland (with home advantage alternating annually) with the winner claiming the Cup (a format identical to the Calcutta Cup in rugby union).

After two years under this format, it was decided to invite a different South American team to compete each year to create more excitement and to fulfil England and Scotland's desire to regularly play stronger teams, which had been one of their reasons for leaving the British Home Championship in the first place. As there were now three teams competing, a league system, just like the one used in the British Home Championship, was introduced. Each team would play the other two once, receiving two points for a win, one for a draw and none for a loss, with goal difference being used to differentiate between teams level on points. England and Scotland continued to play each other home and away in alternating years, but the guest South American team would play both their games away.

Though large numbers of travelling Scots to London had been a feature of England-Scotland games for many years, travelling English support to Glasgow was negligible in comparison until 1987 when minor scuffles broke out on the Hampden Park terracing. In 1989, major disturbances across Glasgow were reported as significant numbers of English hooligans appeared at this fixture for the first time. With English club sides banned from European football at the time, the FA were anxious not to see the national side banned too and the Scotland-England match was a high-profile game that brought interest from across the world. This was a major factor in the demise of the fixture.

The cup was discontinued, after five years, in 1989. The annual England vs Scotland fixture was also abandoned at this point. For many years since then, the oldest rivalry in world football was only renewed when the two nations were drawn together in the Euro 96 group stage and in a two-match qualification play-off for Euro 2000. In the 21st century, the teams have only played each other in three friendly matches (August 2013, November 2014, and September 2023), in two 2018 World Cup qualifying group matches, and in the group stage of the UEFA Euro 2020 tournament.

In 1986, the England vs Scotland match was played in April, restoring it to the time of the year when it had generally been played in the post-war years before the Home Internationals were concentrated in May from 1969. In every other year, the Rous Cup was played in May. This usually fell just after the domestic seasons in each country had finished. In 1989, it coincided with the end of the English domestic season, which had been extended after fixtures were postponed following the Hillsborough disaster.

== Results ==
Ed.	Year	(gold) Winner	Score	(silver) Runner-up	(bronze) Third
1	1985	Scotland	1–0	England	– (Note: Two-teams format.)
2	1986	England	2–1	Scotland	–
3	1987	Brazil	– (Note: Round-robin tournament format.)	England	Scotland
4	1988	England	–	Colombia	Scotland
5	1989	England	–	Scotland	Chile

== All-time table ==
Team	T	Pld	W	D	L	GF	GA	GD	Pts	%
England	5	8	3	4	1	7	4	+3	10	62.50%
Scotland	5	8	2	2	4	4	7	−3	6	37.50%
Brazil	1	2	1	1	0	3	1	+2	3	75.00%
Colombia	1	2	0	2	0	1	1	0	2	50.00%
Chile	1	2	0	1	1	0	2	−2	1	25.00%

Note: Two points for win, one for a draw

== Records ==
- Most appearances: Chris Waddle, Roy Aitken and Alex McLeish (8 appearances)
- Most goals: Gary Lineker (2 goals)
- Highest attendance: 92,000 (England vs Brazil, 1987)
- Lowest attendance: 9,006 (Scotland vs Chile, 1989)
