= Ildemaro Fernández =

Venezuelan footballer (born 1961)

Personal information
- Full name: Ildemaro de Jesús Fernández Uzcátegui
- Date of birth: 27 December 1961 (age 64)
- Place of birth: Mérida, Venezuela
- Height: 1.80 m (5 ft 11 in)
- Position: Forward

Team information
- Current team: Estudiantes de Mérida (assistant)

Senior career*
Years	Team	Apps	(Gls)
1980–1990	Estudiantes de Mérida		
1990–1995	Mineros de Guayana		
1995–1996	Estudiantes de Mérida		

International career
1983–1991	Venezuela	14	(1)

Managerial career
- 2021–: Estudiantes de Mérida (assistant)
- 2022: Estudiantes de Mérida (interim)
- 2025: Estudiantes de Mérida (interim)
- * Club domestic league appearances and goals

Ildemaro de Jesús Fernández Uzcátegui (born 27 December 1961) is a Venezuelan football coach and former player who played as a forward. He is the current assistant manager of Estudiantes de Mérida.
