= Hugo Rubio =

Chilean footballer (born 1960)

Hugo Eduardo Rubio
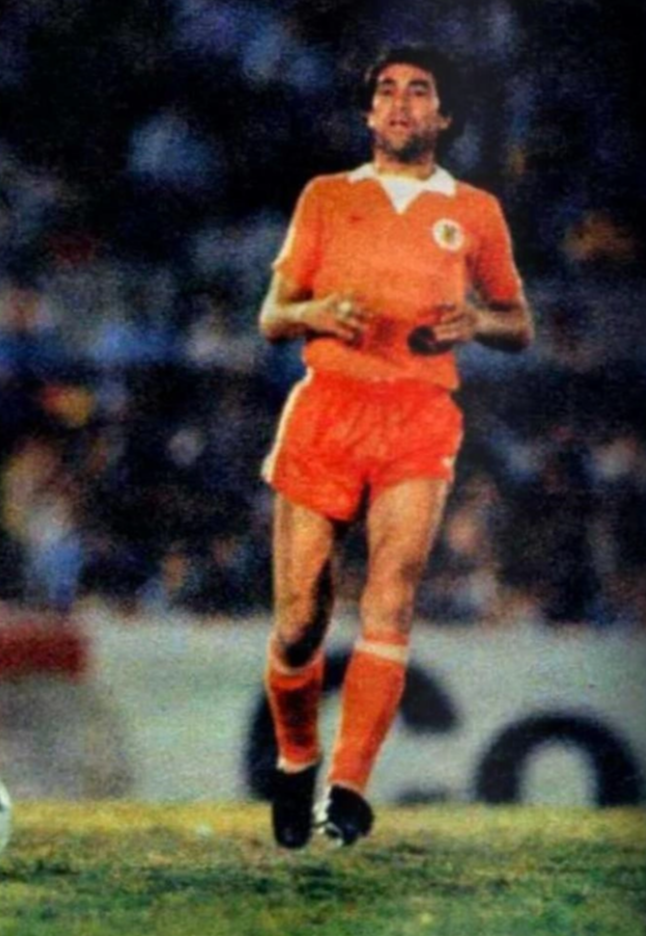
- Rubio with Cobreloa in 1982

Personal information
- Full name: Hugo Eduardo Rubio Montecinos
- Date of birth: 5 July 1960 (age 66)
- Place of birth: Talca, Chile
- Height: 1.78 m (5 ft 10 in)
- Position: Forward

Senior career*
Years	Team	Apps	(Gls)
1979–1982	Rangers		
1982–1985	Cobreloa	81	(8)
1985–1986	Málaga	0	(0)
1986–1987	Colo-Colo	52	(11)
1988	Bologna	14	(0)
1989–1991	St. Gallen	18	(4)
1991–1994	Colo-Colo	57	(10)
1994	Unión Española	11	(4)
1995–1996	Colo-Colo	44	(5)

International career
1983–1991	Chile	36	(13)
- * Club domestic league appearances and goals

Hugo Eduardo Rubio Montecinos (born 5 July 1960) is a Chilean former professional footballer who played as a forward. Rubio's nickname is "Pájaro," which in Spanish is "bird." He was known for his speed and finishing. He played in Chile, Spain, Italy, and Switzerland. Today he is an agent for Pass Ball Sports Management and represents many young Chilean talents such as Luis Jiménez and Matías Fernández.

== Club career ==
At the age of 16, Rubio joined amateur club Club Internacional Atlético Comercio. The club is from Talca and was founded by Rubio's grandfather Aurelio Mortecinos Carrasco. The club paid him $100 per goal he scored. In 1978, he joined the youth system of Rangers de Talca. He also spent time on loan with San Javier, another youth squad.

In 1979, Rubio had an offer to sign with Chilean club San Luis Quillota, an established team. However, he decided to stay with Rangers since he was studying at the time at Universidad Católica de Talca (1978–1981). His first two professional goals came on 6 August 1979 in the '63 and '80 minutes. In 1981, he helped Rangers gain promotion to Chilean First Division.

He became very popular among the Rangers supporters during his time with the club. His good form piqued the interest of Chilean club Cobreloa, who would be playing in the Copa Libertadores. Cobreloa signed Rubio in 1982 and went on to place as runner-up in 1982 Copa Libertadores. In 1982, he won the Chilean national title. He stayed with the club until 1985. During his time with Cobreloa he made a name for himself in all of Chile.

Rubio's good form led him to be loaned to Spanish club CD Málaga, where he would score seven goals in the season of 1985–1986. He was then sold to Chilean club Colo-Colo. He immediately showed his good football once again. In 1988, he was sold for, at the time, a record amount to Italian side Bologna. The profits Colo-Colo received for Rubio helped finish the construction of their current stadium, Estadio Monumental David Arellano.

He scored two goals in five games played in the Coppa Italia. He played in 20 Serie A games before devastatingly injuring himself against Napoli, which kept him out of football for five months. In 1989, he was loaned to FC St. Gallen, where fellow Chilean Ivan Zamorano played. He would stay in Switzerland until 1991.

Rubio returned to Chile to play for Colo-Colo, where he would win the Recopa Sudamericana and Copa Interamericana in 1991. His second stay would last until 1994 when he moved to Unión Española. He scored seven goals in the lone season he played for Unión. His third stop with Colo-Colo would lead to his retirement in 1997.

== International career ==
His international career began in 1983 and lasted until 1991. His two biggest accomplishments with La Roja were the second place in the 1987 Copa América in Argentina and the third place in 1991 Copa América in Chile. He played 36 games and scored 12 goals for La Roja.

== Personal life ==
Rubio is the son of Ildefonso Rubio, a historical goalkeeper of Rangers de Talca.

His sons, Eduardo, Matias and Diego are or were professional footballers. Eduardo and Diego have been internationals with Chile, while Matías was a Chile international at under-20 level.

== Honours ==
Cobreloa

- Copa Libertadores runner-up: 1982
- Chilean Primera División: 1982, 1985

Colo-Colo

- Chilean Primera División: 1986, 1991, 1993, 1996
- Recopa Sudamericana: 1992
- Copa Interamericana: 1992
- Copa Chile: 1996
