= Osvaldo Vargas =

Chilean footballer

Personal information
- Full name: Osvaldo Dionisio Vargas Gómez
- Date of birth: 10 October 1957 (age 69)
- Place of birth: Papudo, Chile
- Position: Centre-back

Youth career
- Independiente Papudo

Senior career*
Years	Team	Apps	(Gls)
1976–1979	Unión La Calera		
1979–1984	O'Higgins	140	(7)
1985–1986	Gimnasia La Plata	11	(1)
1986	Filanbanco		
1986	Unión Española	9	(0)
1987	Rangers		
1988–1989	Deportes Valdivia	47	(2)
1990	Deportes Concepción	17	(0)
1991	Santiago Wanderers	14	(1)
1992	Minervén		
1992	Deportes Antofagasta		
1993	Deportes Puerto Montt		

International career
1979	Chile U20		
1980–1981	Chile	3	(1)
- * Club domestic league appearances and goals

Osvaldo Dionisio Vargas Gómez (born 10 October 1957) is a Chilean former footballer who played as a centre-back. Besides Chile, he played in Argentina, Ecuador and Venezuela.

== Club career ==
As a youth player, Vargas was with Independiente from Papudo and then he joined Unión La Calera in the Chilean second level. In his homeland, he had an extensive career playing for clubs such as O'Higgins, Deportes Valdivia, Deportes Concepción, among others.

Abroad, he played for Gimnasia La Plata in Argentina, Filanbanco in Ecuador and Minervén in Venezuela.

His last club was Deportes Puerto Montt in 1993.

== International career ==
Vargas represented Chile at under-20 level in the 1979 South American Championship.

At senior level, he made three appearances for the Chile national team in friendly matches between 1980 and 1981 and scored one goal against Argentina.

== Personal life ==
He is better known by his nickname Papudo Vargas.

== Post-retirement ==
Vargas started and manages a football academy called "Escuela de Fútbol Osvaldo Papudo Vargas" in his city of birth.

He also has worked in the sports area of the municipalities of both Lampa and Papudo as a football coach for children.
