= Gustavo Neffa =

Paraguayan footballer (born 1971)

Personal information
- Full name: Gustavo Alfredo Neffa Rodríguez
- Date of birth: 30 November 1971 (age 54)
- Place of birth: Asunción, Paraguay
- Positions: Left winger; striker

Youth career
- 1987–1988: Olimpia

Senior career*
Years	Team	Apps	(Gls)
1987–1989	Olimpia	48	(28)
1989–1992	Juventus		
1989–1992	→ Cremonese (loan)	46	(3)
1992	Unión	16	(3)
1992–1995	Boca Juniors	39	(8)
1995–1996	Estudiantes	4	(0)
1996–1998	Sol de América	19	(2)
1999	Olimpia	5	(1)
1999–2000	Dallas Burn	3	(1)

International career
1992	Paraguay U23	8	(2)
1989–1997	Paraguay	15	(4)
- * Club domestic league appearances and goals

Gustavo Alfredo Neffa Rodríguez (born 30 November 1971) is a retired footballer from Paraguay.

He started his career in Olimpia Asunción. At the age of 18, noted by Juventus, Neffa moved on loan to Serie A club U.S. Cremonese. He returned to South America in 1992, playing for Boca Juniors, before leaving football and marrying tennis player Rossana de los Ríos, who gave him a daughter. He also made a short comeback as a player/coach to Dallas Burn in 2000, just appearing on one pre-season match. He also appeared at the 1992 Summer Olympics in the Paraguayan football team, playing a single match against Ghana; it was during this experience that Neffa met his future wife Rossana.

Italian musician Neffa took his name as a homage to Gustavo. Today they are known to be good friends.

== International ==
Neffa made his international debut for the Paraguay national football team on 1 July 1989 in the 1989 Copa América match against Peru (5–2) win, in which he scored once (2–1). He obtained a total number of 15 international caps, scoring four goals for the national side.
