= Javier Ferreira =

Paraguayan footballer (born 1968)

Personal information
- Date of birth: 31 December 1968 (age 57)
- Position: Midfielder

Senior career*
Years	Team	Apps	(Gls)
1990–91	Necaxa México		
1991–92	Atlético Junior Barranquilla		
1993	América Cali		
1995–96	Estudiantes La Plata		
1996–97	América Cali		
1998–99	Sporting Cristal Lima		

International career
	Paraguay	12	(4)
- * Club domestic league appearances and goals

Javier Ferreira is a former Paraguayan international footballer. He played for Paraguay in the 1990 World Cup qualifying campaign. Ferreira was also co-top scorer in the 1988 South American Youth Championship.
