= Leonel Contreras =

Chilean footballer (born 1961)

Personal information
- Full name: Leonel Rodrigo Contreras Zúñiga
- Date of birth: 30 August 1961 (age 65)
- Place of birth: Curacaví, Chile
- Position: Defender

Senior career*
Years	Team	Apps	(Gls)
1982–1989	Everton	183	(12)
1989–1990	Deportes La Serena	54	(1)
1991–1993	Universidad Católica	53	(2)
1994–1995	Everton	45	(0)
Total		335	(15)

International career
1984	Chile Olympic	4	(0)
1985	Chile XI	5	(0)
1985	Chile A-2	2	(0)
1985–1991	Chile	21	(0)
- * Club domestic league appearances and goals

Leonel Rodrigo Contreras Zúñiga (born 30 August 1961) is a Chilean former footballer who played as a defender.

== International career ==
Contreras represented Chile at the 1984 Summer Olympics, making four appearances. The next year, he represented the Chile B-team at the Indonesian Independence Cup and the Los Angeles Nations Cup.

In official matches, Contreras made 21 appearances for the Chile national team between 1985 and 1989.

== Honours ==
Everton

- Copa Polla Gol: 1984

Universidad Católica

- Copa Chile: 1991

Chile B

- Indonesian Independence Cup: 1985

Chile

- Copa del Pacífico: 1988
