= Roberto Rojas =

Chilean footballer (born 1957)

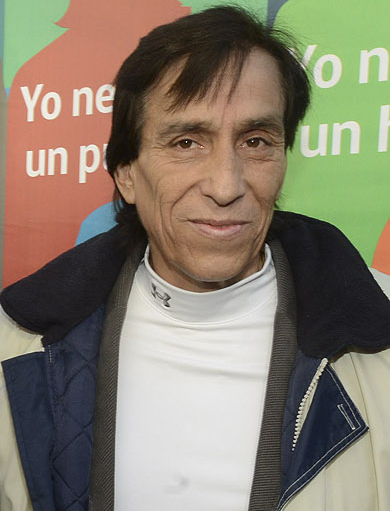
- Rojas in 2013

Personal information
- Full name: Roberto Antonio Rojas Saavedra
- Date of birth: 8 August 1957 (age 69)
- Place of birth: Santiago, Chile
- Height: 1.80 m (5 ft 11 in)
- Position: Goalkeeper

Youth career
- Aviación

Senior career*
Years	Team	Apps	(Gls)
1976–1981	Aviación	77	(0)
1982–1987	Colo-Colo	136	(0)
1987–1989	São Paulo	17	(0)
Total		230	(0)

International career
1983–1989	Chile	49	(0)

Managerial career
- 2003: São Paulo (interim)
- 2007: Comercial
- 2007: Ituiutaba
- 2007: Guaraní
- 2008–2009: Sport Recife (assistant)
- 2009: Sport Recife (interim)
Medal record
Men's football
Representing Chile
Copa América
Runner-up	1987 Argentina
- * Club domestic league appearances and goals

Roberto Antonio Rojas Saavedra (born 8 August 1957), nicknamed El Cóndor, is a retired Chilean football goalkeeper. In 1989, he was found to have deliberately injured himself during a World Cup qualifying match, reportedly in an attempt to have the match of the Chile national team annulled. The incident resulted in a lifetime ban for Rojas and one World Cup ban for Chile. His ban was subsequently lifted in 2001.

== Playing career ==
Rojas was born and raised in the capital Santiago. He began his career in 1976 with Deportes Aviación and went on to play for Colo-Colo from 1983 until 1987. With Colo-Colo, Rojas won national titles in 1983 and 1986. In 1987, after a successful performance in the Copa América, he transferred to Brazil's São Paulo where he remained until 1989.

== Coaching career ==
After his retirement he returned to São Paulo to serve as a goalkeeper coach, training Rogério Ceni. In 2003, Rojas served as interim coach and took the team to the Copa Libertadores for the first time since 1994. He was later a goalkeeping coach for Brazilian side Sport Recife.

As a coach, he led Comercial, Ituiutaba and Sport Recife in Brazil and Guaraní in Paraguay.

== 1989 World Cup qualifying incident ==
In 1989, Rojas was in goal for Chile's 1990 FIFA World Cup qualifier against Brazil at Rio de Janeiro's Maracanã stadium. Chile, down 1–0, would be eliminated from the upcoming World Cup if they failed to defeat Brazil. Around the 70-minute mark of the match, Rojas fell to the pitch writhing and holding his forehead. A firework, thrown from the stands by a Brazilian fan named Rosenery Mello do Nascimento, was smoldering on the pitch about a yard away. At the time, it was believed by some observers that Rojas had been hit by the firework, an incident that could have had the match nullified and possibly even have had Brazil penalized by FIFA. Rojas, with a visible head wound, was carried off the field. The Chilean team then refused to return, stating that conditions were unsafe. The match was unfinished.

FIFA reviewed video evidence and concluded that Rojas had not been hit by the firework. According to a FIFA investigation, Rojas's head injury was self-inflicted with a razor blade concealed in his glove. FIFA awarded Brazil a 2–0 win, effectively eliminating Chile from the 1990 World Cup. As a consequence, Chile was banned from the 1994 FIFA World Cup and Rojas was banned for life, along with the coach Orlando Aravena and the team doctor Daniel Rodriguez.

A Chilean inquiry found that Aravena had ordered Rojas and Rodriguez by walkie-talkie to remain on the ground and that Rojas was to leave the field on a stretcher. The team's co-captain, Fernando Astengo, was banned from football for the next five years for deciding to remove the team from the field.

In 2001, following a request for a pardon, Rojas' ban was lifted by FIFA.

== Honors ==
Colo-Colo

- Primera División de Chile: 1983, 1986
- Copa Chile: 1982

São Paulo

- Série A runner-up: 1989
- Campeonato Paulista: 1987, 1989
- Taça dos Campeões Estaduais Rio – São Paulo: 1987

Chile

- Copa América runner-up: 1987

Individual

- Copa América Team of the Tournament: 1987
