= Orlando Aravena =

Chilean footballer and manager (1942–2024)

Personal information
- Full name: Orlando Enrique Aravena Vergara
- Date of birth: 21 October 1942
- Place of birth: Talca, Chile
- Date of death: 21 March 2024 (aged 81)
- Place of death: Santiago, Chile
- Height: 1.70 m (5 ft 7 in)
- Position: Midfielder

Senior career*
Years	Team	Apps	(Gls)
1957	Magallanes	19	(0)
1958–1964	Deportes La Serena	120	(3)
1965	Palestino	31	(2)
1966–1969	Colo-Colo	78	(5)
1970	Deportes La Serena	28	(0)
1971–1972	Ñublense	64	(1)
Total		340	(11)

International career
1957–1965	Chile	6	(0)

Managerial career
- 1975: Chile U20
- 1976: Colo-Colo
- 1977: Ñublense
- 1978: Universidad Católica
- 1980: Unión Española
- 1981: O'Higgins
- 1983: Rangers
- 1984–1985: Unión Española
- 1986: Everton
- 1986–1987: Palestino
- 1987: Chile U23
- 1987–1989: Chile
- 1996: Palestino
- 2002-2003: Magallanes
- 2006: Santiago Morning
- * Club domestic league appearances and goals

Orlando Enrique Aravena Vergara (21 October 1942 – 21 March 2024) was a Chilean football player and manager.

== Career ==
As a player, Aravena played for Magallanes, Deportes La Serena, Palestino, Colo-Colo and Ñublense. With Deportes La Serena, he won the 1960 Copa Preparación.

As a manager, Aravena coached the Chile national U20 team in 1975 and the under-23's in the 1987 Pre-Olympic Tournament. At senior level, he led Chile during the 1987 Copa América, where the team reached the tournament final. He ended his international career as team manager during Chile's qualification attempt for the 1990 FIFA World Cup.

=== Maracanazo ===
Aravena received a five-year ban from FIFA for his part in a plan to have a World Cup qualifying game awarded to Chile. He had ordered goalkeeper Roberto Rojas to feign injury after Rojas was almost hit by an incendiary device thrown onto the pitch at Estádio do Maracanã.

== Personal life and death ==
Aravena suffered from Alzheimer's disease and died on 21 March 2024 in Santiago. He was 81.

Orlando Aravena was the uncle of Jorge Aravena, who was also a Chilean international footballer.
