= Jaime Ramírez (footballer, born 1967) =

Chilean footballer

Personal information
- Full name: Jaime Patricio Ramírez Manríquez
- Date of birth: 3 March 1967 (age 59)
- Place of birth: Santiago, Chile
- Height: 1.74 m (5 ft 9 in)
- Position: Midfielder

Youth career
- Unión Española

Senior career*
Years	Team	Apps	(Gls)
1985–1989	Unión Española		
1989–1991	Sion		
1991	Colo-Colo		
1992	Deportes Concepción		
1992–1993	Morelia		
1993–1995	Toros Neza		
1995	Unión Española		
1996	Universidad de Chile		
1998	Unión Española		

International career
1986	Chile U20		
1988–1996	Chile	19	(2)
- * Club domestic league appearances and goals

Jaime Patricio Ramírez Manríquez (born 3 March 1967) is a Chilean former professional footballer who played as a midfielder.

== International career ==
After having taken part of the Chile at under-20 level, he made his debut for the Chile senior team on 13 September 1988 in a friendly match against Ecuador.

== Honours ==
Unión Española

- Copa Invierno: 1989

Colo-Colo

- Chilean Primera División: 1991
