= Fernando Astengo =

Chilean footballer and manager (born 1960)

Personal information
- Full name: Fernando Enrique Astengo Sánchez
- Date of birth: 8 January 1960 (age 66)
- Place of birth: Santiago, Chile
- Height: 1.77 m (5 ft 9 1/2 in)
- Position: Centre back

Youth career
- 1973–1977: Unión Española

Senior career*
Years	Team	Apps	(Gls)
1978–1985	Unión Española	134	(15)
1979	→ Rangers de Talca (loan)		
1986	Colo-Colo	32	(5)
1987–1990	Grêmio	43	(0)
1993–1998	Unión Española	49+	(3)
1995	→ Audax Italiano (loan)	24	(1)

International career
1985	Chile XI	5	(0)
1985	Chile A-2	2	(0)
1986–1989	Chile	19	(3)

Managerial career
- 2008: Colo-Colo
- 2013: Deportes Temuco
- 2014: Deportes Iquique (assistant)
- * Club domestic league appearances and goals

Fernando Enrique Astengo Sánchez (born 8 January 1960) is a Chilean football manager and former centre-back.

== Playing career and El Maracanazo ==
Astengo gained prominence as a reliable defender at Unión Española, Colo-Colo and Grêmio. However, the 1989 El Maracanazo between Chile and Brazil left a lasting mark on his career.

As goalkeeper Roberto Rojas faked an injury midway through the second half, Astengo led the Chileans to walk out in protest, hoping that this action would annul the match and either forcing a replay on neutral ground or disqualifying Brazil entirely. Once Brazilian television crews revealed the truth, FIFA barred Chile from 1994 FIFA World Cup qualification and banned Rojas for life (the latter sanction was lifted in 2001 on appeal), while Astengo, who would never play internationally again, and head coach Orlando Aravena received five-year suspensions.

== Coaching career ==
Upon retiring, Astengo ventured into coaching, graduating in 2005 at the INAF (National Football Institute) alongside former players such as Eduardo Nazar, José Cantillana, Eduardo Soto, among others. He began his career with Colo-Colo lower divisions as sport director, later having a brief spell as first-team caretaker coach in 2008, replacing Claudio Borghi. However, he left the Pedreros–based team and then had short periods at Unión San Felipe youth ranks in 2009, as sport director, and Deportes Temuco in 2013, as head coach. In 2014, he also served as assistant coach of Nelson Acosta in Deportes Iquique.

== Other works ==
Astengo has permanently worked as a football commentator for TV media such as Canal del Fútbol (CDF) and DirecTV Sports. In addition, he has worked for the digital media Radio TouchTV.

== Honours ==
=== Player ===
Colo-Colo

- Primera División (1): 1986

Grêmio

- Copa do Brasil (1): 1989
- Campeonato Gaúcho (3): 1987, 1988, 1989

Individual

- 1988 America Ideal Team

Chile B

- Indonesian Independence Cup: 1985

=== Manager ===
Colo-Colo

- Torneo Apertura (1): Runner-up 2008
