= Rubén Espinoza =

Chilean footballer (born 1961)

Personal information
- Full name: Rubén Alberto Espinoza Molina
- Date of birth: 1 June 1961 (age 65)
- Place of birth: Tomé, Chile
- Height: 1.80 m (5 ft 11 in)
- Position: Midfielder

Senior career*
Years	Team	Apps	(Gls)
1979–1988	Universidad Católica	320	(24)
1989–1991	Colo-Colo	97	(13)
1991–1992	Cruz Azul	35	(1)
1992–1994	O'Higgins	69	(8)
1993	→ Everton (loan)	20	(5)
1994	Unión Española	21	(4)
1995	Universidad Católica	17	(2)
1996	Richmond Kickers	9	(3)
Total		588	(60)

International career
1983–1991	Chile	30	(5)

Managerial career
- 2001: O'Higgins
- 2006: Unión San Felipe
- 2017: Ñublense (interim)
- * Club domestic league appearances and goals

Rubén Alberto Espinoza Molina (born 1 June 1961) is a retired Chilean international football midfielder.

== Playing career ==
Espinoza was capped 30 times for the Chile national team between 1983 and 1991. In 1991, he won the Libertadores de América Cup, with Colo-Colo. He made his debut for the national squad on 1983-04-28 in a friendly against Brazil.

Espinoza spent most of his career playing club football in Chile, and spent nine years with the Chile national team. He played one season with Mexican side Cruz Azul, helping the club reach the semi-finals where they lost to León. He finished his career playing in the USISL Select League for the Richmond Kickers.

== Coaching career ==
In 2001 he had a stint as coach of O'Higgins. In 2006 he coached Unión San Felipe in the Primera B de Chile.

In 2015 he came to Ñublense as Sport Manager, assuming as interim coach in 2017.
