= Juan Carlos Letelier =

Chilean footballer (born 1959)

Personal information
- Full name: Juan Carlos Letelier Pizarro
- Date of birth: 20 May 1959 (age 67)
- Place of birth: Valparaíso, Chile
- Height: 1.79 m (5 ft 10 1/2 in)
- Position: Striker

Youth career
- Carlos Vial
- Santiago Wanderers

Senior career*
Years	Team	Apps	(Gls)
1978–1980	Santiago Wanderers	58	(16)
1981	Audax Italiano	27	(13)
1982–1987	Cobreloa	171	(72)
1988	Independiente Medellín		
1989–1990	Deportes La Serena	34	(13)
1990	Internacional	10	(3)
1990–1991	Cruz Azul	19	(1)
1991	Deportes Antofagasta	19	(1)
1992	Universitario		(8)
1993	Caracas		
1993	Santiago Wanderers		
1994	Sporting Cristal		
1995	Deportes La Serena	22	(1)

International career
1979–1989	Chile	57	(18)
- * Club domestic league appearances and goals as of 7 September 2025

Juan Carlos Letelier Pizarro (born 20 May 1959 in Valparaíso) is a former football striker from Chile, who was nicknamed "Pato" and/or "Lete". He played for his native country at the 1982 FIFA World Cup in Spain. He played 57 times for his country scoring 18 goals between 1979 and 1989, scoring the last goal against Algeria at the 1982 World Cup.

During his club career, Letelier played professional football in Chile, Colombia, Brazil, Mexico, Peru, and Venezuela.

== International career ==
At the international level, Letelier played for the Chilean team for an entire decade, making 57 appearances and scoring 18 goals between 1979 and 1989; his last international match came against Brazil on 3 September 1989.

== Post-retirement ==
Letelier has worked as groundskeeper for the Estadio Municipal de La Pintana.

== Career statistics ==
=== International ===
Appearances and goals by national team and year
National team	Year	Apps	Goals
Chile	1979	2	0
Chile	1982	5	2
Chile	1983	12	6
Chile	1984	1	0
Chile	1985	14	3
Chile	1987	5	3
Chile	1989	18	4
Total		57	18

Scores and results list Paraguay's goal tally first, score column indicates score after each Mendoza goal.

List of international goals scored by Alfredo Mendoza
No.	Date	Venue	Opponent	Score	Result	Competition	Ref.
1	23 March 1982	Estadio Nacional, Santiago, Chile	Peru	1–0	2–1	Friendly	
2	24 June 1982	Estadio Carlos Tartiere, Oviedo, Spain	Algeria	2–3	2–3	1982 FIFA World Cup	
3	19 July 1983	Estadio Hernando Siles, La Paz, Bolivia	Bolivia	2–0	2–1	Friendly	
4	3 August 1983	Estadio Carlos Dittborn, Arica, Chile	Peru	1–0	2–0	Copa del Pacífico 1983	
5	3 August 1983	Estadio Carlos Dittborn, Arica, Chile	Peru	2–0	2–0	Copa del Pacífico 1983	
6	17 August 1983	Estadio Regional, Antofagasta, Chile	Paraguay	2–1	3–2	Friendly	
7	24 August 1983	Estadio Carlos Dittborn, Arica, Chile	Bolivia	1–0	4–2	Friendly	
8	11 September 1983	Estadio Nacional, Santiago, Chile	Uruguay	2–0	2–0	1983 Copa América	
9	8 February 1985	Estadio Sausalito, Viña del Mar, Chile	Finland	1–0	2–0	Friendly	
10	21 February 1985	Estadio Nacional, Santiago, Chile	Colombia	1–1	1–1	Friendly	
11	3 March 1985	Estadio Olímpico Atahualpa, Quito, Ecuador	Ecuador	1–0	1–1	1986 FIFA World Cup qualification	
12	30 June 1987	Estadio Córdoba, Córdoba, Argentina	Venezuela	1–0	3–1	1987 Copa América	
13	3 July 1987	Estadio Córdoba, Córdoba, Argentina	Brazil	2–0	4–0	1987 Copa América	
14	3 July 1987	Estadio Córdoba, Córdoba, Argentina	Brazil	4–0	4–0	1987 Copa América	
15	10 July 1989	Estádio Serra Dourada, Goiânia, Brazil	Ecuador	2–0	2–1	1989 Copa América	
16	27 August 1989	Estadio Malvinas Argentinas, Mendoza, Argentina	Venezuela	1–0	5–0	1990 FIFA World Cup qualification	
17	27 August 1989	Estadio Malvinas Argentinas, Mendoza, Argentina	Venezuela	2–0	5–0	1990 FIFA World Cup qualification	
18	27 August 1989	Estadio Malvinas Argentinas, Mendoza, Argentina	Venezuela	4–0	5–0	1990 FIFA World Cup qualification	

== Honours ==
- Cobreloa
  - Chilean League: 1982, 1985
- Universitario
  - Peruvian League: 1992
- Sporting Cristal
  - Peruvian League: 1994
