= Hugo González (Chilean footballer) =

Chilean footballer (born 1963)

Personal information
- Full name: Hugo Armando González Muñoz
- Date of birth: 11 March 1963 (age 63)
- Place of birth: Santiago, Chile
- Position: Centre-back

Team information
- Current team: Colo-Colo (youth manager)

Youth career
- Colo-Colo

Senior career*
Years	Team	Apps	(Gls)
1984–1989	Colo-Colo		
1984	→ Santiago Wanderers (loan)		
1990–1992	Cruz Azul		
1992–1993	Cobreloa		
1994	Colo-Colo		
1995	Deportes Concepción		
1996	Magallanes		

International career
1988–1993	Chile	24	(1)

Managerial career
- 2001–: Colo-Colo (youth)
- 2013: Colo-Colo (interim)
- 2016: Colo-Colo (interim)
- 2025: Colo-Colo (interim)
- * Club domestic league appearances and goals

Hugo Armando González Muñoz (born 11 March 1963) is a Chilean football manager and former player who played as a centre-back. He is the current manager of Colo-Colo's youth sides.

González was born in Santiago de Chile and made his debut for the national senior squad on 25 June 1988, in a friendly against Peru.

== Personal life ==
His son, Hugo González Flores, is a sport manager who has served for San Antonio Unido.

== Honours ==
Colo-Colo

- Chilean Primera División (2): 1986, 1989
- Copa Chile (4): 1985, 1988, 1989, 1994

Cobreloa

- Chilean Primera División (1): 1992

Chile

- Copa del Pacífico (1): 1988
