= Óscar Reyes =

Chilean footballer (born 1957)

Patricio Reyes
Personal information
- Full name: Óscar Patricio Reyes Sánchez
- Date of birth: 16 December 1957 (age 68)
- Place of birth: Arica, Chile
- Position: Defender

Senior career*
| Years | Team | Apps | (Gls) |
| 1977–1991 | Universidad de Chile | | |
| 1978 | → Deportes Arica | | |
| 1989 | → Deportes La Serena | | |

International career
| 1983–1989 | Chile | 30 | (1) |
- * Club domestic league appearances and goals

Óscar Patricio Reyes Sánchez (born 16 December 1957) is a retired Chilean football defender. He was part of Chile's squad for the 1987 Copa América tournament.
