= 1991 Copa América squads =

Below are the rosters for the Copa América 1991 tournament in Chile, from 6 to 21 July 1991.

== Group A ==
=== Argentina ===
Head coach: Alfio Basile

No.	Pos.	Player	Date of birth (age)	Caps	Club
1	GK	Sergio Goycochea	17 October 1963 (aged 27)		(Argentina) Racing Club
2	DF	Sergio Vázquez	23 November 1965 (aged 25)		(Argentina) Ferro Carril Oeste
3	DF	Carlos Enrique	12 December 1963 (aged 27)		(Argentina) River Plate
4	DF	Fabián Basualdo	26 February 1964 (aged 27)		(Argentina) River Plate
5	MF	Leonardo Astrada	6 January 1970 (aged 21)		(Argentina) River Plate
6	DF	Oscar Ruggeri	26 January 1962 (aged 29)		(Argentina) Vélez Sársfield
7	FW	Claudio Caniggia	9 January 1967 (aged 24)		(Italy) Atalanta
8	MF	Dario Franco	17 January 1969 (aged 22)		(Argentina) Newell's Old Boys
9	FW	Gabriel Batistuta	1 February 1969 (aged 22)		(Argentina) Boca Juniors
10	MF	Diego Simeone	28 April 1970 (aged 21)		(Italy) Pisa
11	FW	Diego Latorre	4 August 1969 (aged 21)		(Argentina) Boca Juniors
12	GK	Alejandro Lanari	2 May 1960 (aged 31)		(Argentina) Rosario Central
13	DF	Fernando Gamboa	28 October 1970 (aged 20)		(Argentina) Newell's Old Boys
14	DF	Néstor Craviotto	3 October 1963 (aged 27)		(Argentina) Independiente
15	DF	Ricardo Altamirano	12 December 1965 (aged 25)		(Argentina) Independiente
16	FW	Claudio García	24 August 1963 (aged 27)		(Argentina) Racing Club
17	MF	Gustavo Zapata	15 October 1967 (aged 23)		(Argentina) River Plate
18	FW	Ramón Medina Bello	29 April 1966 (aged 25)		(Argentina) River Plate
19	FW	Antonio Mohamed	2 April 1970 (aged 21)		(Argentina) Huracán
20	MF	Leonardo Rodríguez	27 August 1966 (aged 24)		(Argentina) San Lorenzo
21	MF	Blas Giunta	6 September 1963 (aged 27)		(Argentina) Boca Juniors
22	GK	Fabián Cancelarich	20 December 1965 (aged 25)		(Argentina) Ferro Carril Oeste

=== Chile ===
Head coach: Arturo Salah

No.	Pos.	Player	Date of birth (age)	Caps	Club
1	GK	Patricio Toledo	14 July 1962 (aged 28)	5	(Chile) Universidad Católica
2	DF	Rubén Espinoza	1 June 1961 (aged 30)	30	(Chile) Colo-Colo
3	DF	Lizardo Garrido	25 August 1957 (aged 33)	37	(Chile) Colo-Colo
4	DF	Javier Margas	10 May 1969 (aged 22)	3	(Chile) Colo-Colo
5	DF	Eduardo Vilches	21 April 1963 (aged 28)	5	(Chile) Colo-Colo
6	DF	Miguel Ramírez	11 June 1970 (aged 21)	3	(Chile) Colo-Colo
7	FW	Patricio Yañez	20 January 1961 (aged 30)	36	(Chile) Colo-Colo
8	MF	Jorge Contreras	3 July 1960 (aged 31)	6	(Chile) Universidad Católica
9	FW	Iván Zamorano	18 January 1967 (aged 24)	14	(Spain) Sevilla
10	MF	Jaime Pizarro	2 March 1964 (aged 27)	39	(Chile) Colo-Colo
11	FW	Hugo Eduardo Rubio	5 July 1960 (aged 31)	29	(Switzerland) St. Gallen
12	GK	Marco Cornez	15 October 1957 (aged 33)	20	(Chile) Antofagasta
13	DF	Ronald Fuentes	22 June 1969 (aged 22)	3	(Chile) Cobresal
14	DF	Andrés Romero	11 May 1967 (aged 24)	6	(Chile) Universidad Católica
15	DF	Gabriel Mendoza	22 May 1968 (aged 23)	0	(Chile) Colo-Colo
16	DF	Rodrigo Gómez	8 November 1960 (aged 30)	5	(Chile) Palestino
17	MF	Nelson Parraguez	5 April 1971 (aged 20)	3	(Chile) Universidad Católica
18	MF	Jaime Vera	2 March 1963 (aged 28)	20	(Greece) OFI
19	FW	Ivo Basay	13 April 1966 (aged 25)	16	(Mexico) Necaxa
20	MF	Fabián Estay	5 October 1968 (aged 22)	8	(Chile) Universidad Católica
21	FW	Aníbal González	23 March 1963 (aged 28)	8	(Chile) Unión Española
22	MF	Marcelo Vega	12 August 1971 (aged 19)	2	(Chile) Unión Española

=== Paraguay ===
Head coach: Carlos Alberto Kiese

No.	Pos.	Player	Date of birth (age)	Caps	Club
1	GK	José Luis Chilavert	27 July 1965 (aged 25)		(Spain) Real Zaragoza
2	DF	Teófilo Barrios	24 July 1964 (aged 26)		(Paraguay) Cerro Porteño
3	DF	Blas Cristaldo	9 December 1964 (aged 26)		(Paraguay) Cerro Porteño
4	DF	Silvio Suárez	5 January 1969 (aged 22)		(Paraguay) Olimpia Asunción
5	DF	Catalino Rivarola	30 April 1965 (aged 26)		(Paraguay) Cerro Porteño
6	DF	Vidal Sanabria	11 April 1967 (aged 24)		(Paraguay) Olimpia Asunción
7	MF	Gustavo Neffa	3 November 1971 (aged 19)		(Italy) Cremonese
8	MF	Carlos Guirland	18 September 1968 (aged 22)		(Paraguay) Olimpia Asunción
9	FW	José Cardozo	19 March 1971 (aged 20)		(Switzerland) St. Gallen
10	MF	Luis Alberto Monzón	26 May 1970 (aged 21)		(Paraguay) Olimpia Asunción
11	FW	Gabriel González	18 March 1961 (aged 30)		(Paraguay) Olimpia Asunción
12	GK	Rubén Ruiz Díaz	11 November 1969 (aged 21)		(Argentina) San Lorenzo
13	DF	Héctor Vidal Martínez	15 June 1967 (aged 24)		(Paraguay) Cerro Corá
14	DF	Justo Jacquet	9 September 1961 (aged 29)		(Paraguay) Cerro Porteño
15	MF	Estanislao Struway	25 June 1968 (aged 23)		(Paraguay) Cerro Porteño
16	MF	Miguel Sanabria	11 November 1964 (aged 26)		(Bolivia) Club Bolívar
17	MF	Víctor Genés	29 June 1961 (aged 30)		(Paraguay) Guaraní
18	MF	Blas Romero	2 February 1966 (aged 25)		(Paraguay) Club Libertad
19	FW	Guido Alvarenga	24 August 1970 (aged 20)		(Paraguay) Cerro Porteño
20	DF	César Zabala	3 June 1961 (aged 30)		(Paraguay) Cerro Porteño
21	FW	Julio César Yegros	31 January 1971 (aged 20)		(Paraguay) Cerro Porteño
22	MF	Felipe Peralta	5 February 1962 (aged 29)		(Paraguay) Atlético Colegiales

=== Peru ===
Head coach: Miguel Company

No.	Pos.	Player	Date of birth (age)	Caps	Club
1	GK	Jesús Purizaga	24 December 1959 (aged 31)		(Peru) Alianza Lima
2	DF	Percy Olivares	5 June 1968 (aged 23)		(Peru) Sporting Cristal
3	DF	Alvaro Barco	27 June 1967 (aged 24)		(Peru) Universitario
4	DF	Martín Ramírez	20 January 1964 (aged 27)		(Peru) San Agustín
5	DF	Jorge Arteaga	29 December 1966 (aged 24)		(Peru) Sporting Cristal
6	MF	Jorge Cordero	18 March 1962 (aged 29)		(Argentina) Gimnasia y Esgrima La Plata
7	MF	Ernesto Aguirre	14 November 1968 (aged 22)		(Peru) Unión Huaral
8	MF	José del Solar	28 November 1967 (aged 23)		(Chile) Universidad Católica
9	FW	Andrés González	1 June 1963 (aged 28)		(Peru) Universitario
10	MF	César Rodríguez	3 February 1968 (aged 23)		(Peru) Alianza Lima
11	FW	Jorge Hirano	18 September 1956 (aged 34)		(Bolivia) Club Bolívar
12	GK	Gustavo González	15 September 1964 (aged 26)		(Peru) Unión Huaral
14	DF	Roberto Martínez	3 December 1967 (aged 23)		(Peru) Universitario
15	DF	Octavio Vidales	3 February 1963 (aged 28)		(Peru) Universitario
16	MF	Alfonso Yáñez	2 May 1966 (aged 25)		(Peru) Universitario
17	FW	Ricardo Bravo	14 January 1969 (aged 22)		(Peru) Universitario
18	FW	Flavio Maestri	21 January 1973 (aged 18)		(Peru) Sporting Cristal
19	FW	Eugenio La Rosa	21 January 1967 (aged 24)		(Peru) Sporting Cristal
20	MF	Martín Rodríguez	24 September 1968 (aged 22)		(Peru) Internazionale San Borja
21	GK	Diosdado Palma	1 April 1965 (aged 26)		(Peru) Defensor Lima
22	MF	José Luis Carranza	8 January 1964 (aged 27)		(Peru) Universitario

=== Venezuela ===
Head coach: Víctor Pignanelli

No.	Pos.	Player	Date of birth (age)	Caps	Club
1	GK	Rafael Dudamel	7 January 1973 (aged 18)		(Venezuela) ULA Mérida
2	DF	César Marcano	31 October 1957 (aged 33)		(Venezuela) Sport Maritimo
3	DF	William Pacheco	18 April 1962 (aged 29)		(Venezuela) Minervén
4	DF	José Jiménez	7 October 1968 (aged 22)		(Venezuela) Portuguesa
5	DF	Roberto Cavallo	28 April 1967 (aged 24)		(Venezuela) Deportivo Italia
6	FW	José Flores	28 June 1967 (aged 24)		(Venezuela) Anzoátegui
7	MF	Ildemaro Fernández	27 December 1961 (aged 29)		(Venezuela) Mineros
8	MF	Laureano Jaimes	13 July 1961 (aged 29)		(Venezuela) Táchira
9	FW	Alexander Bottini	7 May 1969 (aged 22)		(Venezuela) Monagas Sport Club
10	MF	Carlos Maldonado	30 July 1963 (aged 27)		(Venezuela) Táchira
11	FW	Stalin Rivas	5 September 1971 (aged 19)		(Venezuela) Mineros
12	GK	Franco Fasciana	8 March 1960 (aged 31)		(Venezuela) Atlético Zamora
13	DF	Ceferino Bencomo	1 November 1970 (aged 20)		(Venezuela) Caracas FC
14	DF	Andrés Paz	30 November 1963 (aged 27)		(Venezuela) Táchira
15	DF	Miguel Echenausi	21 February 1968 (aged 23)		(Venezuela) Táchira
16	MF	Juan Carlos Babio	8 February 1965 (aged 26)		(Venezuela) ULA Mérida
17	MF	Otilio Yantis	23 June 1967 (aged 24)		(Venezuela) Mineros
18	FW	Pedro Gallardo	2 May 1969 (aged 22)		(Venezuela) Portuguesa
19	FW	Robert Rodallega	18 November 1969 (aged 21)		(Venezuela) Táchira
20	MF	Carlos Castro	18 March 1968 (aged 23)		(Venezuela) Táchira
21	FW	Arnulfo Becerra	4 April 1962 (aged 29)		(Venezuela) Táchira
22	GK	José Gregorio Gómez	27 December 1963 (aged 27)		(Venezuela) Mineros

== Group B ==
=== Bolivia ===
Head coach: Ramiro Blacut

No.	Pos.	Player	Date of birth (age)	Caps	Club
1	GK	Marco Antonio Barrero	26 January 1962 (aged 29)		(Bolivia) Bolivar
2	DF	Miguel Rimba	1 November 1967 (aged 23)		(Bolivia) Bolivar
3	DF	Eduardo Jiguchi	24 August 1970 (aged 20)		(Bolivia) Oriente Petrolero
4	DF	Marciano Saldías	25 April 1966 (aged 25)		(Bolivia) Oriente Petrolero
5	DF	Marcos Ferrufino	25 April 1963 (aged 28)		(Bolivia) Bolivar
6	MF	Sergio Rivero	6 December 1963 (aged 27)		(Bolivia) Oriente Petrolero
7	MF	Carlos Borja	25 December 1960 (aged 30)		(Bolivia) Bolivar
8	MF	José Melgar	20 September 1959 (aged 31)		(Bolivia) Blooming
9	FW	Juan Berthy Suárez	24 June 1966 (aged 25)		(Bolivia) Blooming
10	MF	Marco Etcheverry	26 September 1970 (aged 20)		(Bolivia) Bolivar
11	FW	Jaime Moreno	19 January 1974 (aged 17)		(Bolivia) Blooming
12	GK	Mauricio Soria	1 June 1966 (aged 25)		(Bolivia) Oriente Petrolero
13	DF	Juan Manuel Peña	17 January 1973 (aged 18)		(Bolivia) Blooming
14	MF	José Medrano	2 November 1962 (aged 28)		(Bolivia) Oriente Petrolero
15	DF	Modesto Soruco	12 February 1966 (aged 25)		(Bolivia) Blooming
16	MF	Erwin Sánchez	19 October 1969 (aged 21)		(Portugal) Benfica
17	DF	Juan Carlos Chávez	11 December 1972 (aged 18)		(Bolivia) Blooming
18	FW	Modesto Molina	1 December 1961 (aged 29)		(Bolivia) Oriente Petrolero
19	FW	Álvaro Peña	11 February 1965 (aged 26)		(Bolivia) San José
20	MF	Ramiro Castillo	27 March 1966 (aged 25)		(Argentina) River Plate
21	MF	Julio César Baldivieso	2 December 1971 (aged 19)		(Bolivia) Bolivar
22	GK	Víctor Aragón	23 December 1966 (aged 24)		(Bolivia) The Strongest

=== Brazil ===
Head coach: Falcão

No.	Pos.	Player	Date of birth (age)	Caps	Club
1	GK	Cláudio Taffarel	8 May 1966 (aged 25)	33	(Italy) Parma
2	MF	Mazinho	8 April 1966 (aged 25)	19	(Italy) Lecce
3	DF	Cléber	26 July 1969 (aged 21)	2	(Brazil) Atlético Mineiro
4	DF	Ricardo Rocha	11 September 1962 (aged 28)	19	(Brazil) São Paulo
5	MF	Mauro Silva	12 January 1968 (aged 23)	3	(Brazil) Bragantino
6	DF	Branco	4 April 1964 (aged 27)	40	(Italy) Genoa
7	FW	Renato Gaúcho	9 September 1962 (aged 28)	27	(Brazil) Botafogo
8	MF	Valdir	25 October 1965 (aged 25)	2	(Brazil) Atlético Paranaense
9	FW	Carlos Alberto Bianchezi	25 August 1964 (aged 26)	7	(Brazil) Palmeiras
10	MF	Neto	9 September 1966 (aged 24)	8	(Brazil) Corinthians
11	FW	João Paulo	7 September 1964 (aged 26)	9	(Italy) Bari
12	GK	Sérgio	7 November 1962 (aged 28)	6	(Brazil) Santos
13	DF	Cafu	7 June 1970 (aged 21)	7	(Brazil) São Paulo
14	DF	Wilson Gottardo	23 May 1963 (aged 28)	3	(Brazil) Flamengo
15	DF	Márcio Santos	15 September 1969 (aged 21)	4	(Brazil) Internacional
16	DF	Lira	2 April 1966 (aged 25)	3	(Brazil) Goiás
17	MF	Márcio	19 October 1964 (aged 26)	1	(Brazil) Corinthians
18	MF	Raí	15 May 1965 (aged 26)	11	(Brazil) São Paulo
19	MF	Luís Henrique	20 October 1968 (aged 22)	3	(Brazil) Bahia
20	FW	Mazinho Oliveira	26 December 1965 (aged 25)	5	(Brazil) Bragantino
21	FW	Sílvio	6 March 1970 (aged 21)	0	(Brazil) Bragantino
22	GK	Ronaldo	20 November 1967 (aged 23)	0	(Brazil) Corinthians

=== Colombia ===
Head coach: Luis Augusto García

No.	Pos.	Player	Date of birth (age)	Caps	Club
1	GK	René Higuita	28 August 1966 (aged 24)	41	(Colombia) Atlético Nacional
2	DF	Andrés Escobar	13 March 1967 (aged 24)	27	(Colombia) Atlético Nacional
3	DF	Gabriel Martínez	3 July 1958 (aged 33)	1	(Colombia) Atlético Junior
4	DF	Eduardo Pimentel	26 May 1959 (aged 32)	3	(Colombia) América Cali
5	DF	Luis Fernando Herrera	12 June 1962 (aged 29)	23	(Colombia) Atlético Nacional
6	MF	Óscar Pareja	10 August 1968 (aged 22)	2	(Colombia) Independiente Medellín
7	FW	Antony de Ávila	21 December 1962 (aged 28)	18	(Colombia) América Cali
8	MF	Alexis García	21 July 1960 (aged 30)		(Colombia) Atlético Nacional
9	FW	Iván Valenciano	18 March 1972 (aged 19)		(Colombia) Atlético Junior
10	MF	Carlos Valderrama	2 September 1961 (aged 29)	32	(France) Montpellier
11	FW	Bernardo Redín	26 February 1963 (aged 28)	37	(Bulgaria) CSKA Sofia
22	GK	Eduardo Niño	8 August 1967 (aged 23)		(Colombia) Atlético Junior
13	DF	Wilmer Cabrera	15 September 1967 (aged 23)	6	(Colombia) América Cali
14	MF	Leonel Álvarez	29 July 1965 (aged 25)		(Spain) Real Valladolid
15	DF	Luis Carlos Perea	29 December 1963 (aged 27)	41	(Colombia) Independiente Medellín
16	MF	Carlos Estrada	1 November 1961 (aged 29)	11	(Colombia) Deportivo Cali
17	DF	Diego Osorio	21 July 1970 (aged 20)	1	(Colombia) Atlético Nacional
18	FW	Arnoldo Iguarán	31 January 1957 (aged 34)	63	(Colombia) Millonarios
19	FW	Albeiro Usuriaga	12 June 1966 (aged 25)	10	(Colombia) América Cali
20	MF	Freddy Rincón	14 August 1966 (aged 24)	16	(Colombia) América Cali
21	FW	Augusto Vargas Cortés	26 March 1962 (aged 29)	1	(Colombia) Deportes Quindío
12	GK	Miguel Calero	14 April 1971 (aged 19)	0	(Colombia) Deportivo Cali

=== Ecuador ===
Head coach: (Socialist Federal Republic of Yugoslavia) Dušan Drašković

No.	Pos.	Player	Date of birth (age)	Caps	Club
1	GK	Erwin Ramírez	13 November 1971 (aged 19)		(Ecuador) Green Cross
2	MF	Freddy Bravo	12 April 1962 (aged 29)		(Ecuador) Barcelona
3	DF	Luis Capurro	1 May 1961 (aged 30)		(Ecuador) Emelec
4	DF	Wilson Macías	30 September 1965 (aged 25)		(Ecuador) Barcelona
5	DF	Jimmy Montanero	24 August 1960 (aged 30)		(Ecuador) Barcelona
6	DF	Hólger Quiñónez	18 September 1962 (aged 28)		(Ecuador) Emelec
7	FW	Carlos Muñoz	24 October 1967 (aged 23)		(Ecuador) Barcelona
8	MF	Juan Carlos Garay	15 September 1968 (aged 22)		(Ecuador) El Nacional
9	DF	Byron Tenorio	14 June 1966 (aged 25)		(Ecuador) El Nacional
10	MF	Robert Burbano	27 September 1970 (aged 20)		(Ecuador) Universidad Católica
11	FW	Stony Batioja	30 April 1964 (aged 27)		(Ecuador) Váldez
12	GK	Carlos Enríquez	22 May 1966 (aged 25)		(Ecuador) Deportivo Quito
13	DF	José María Guerrero	1 April 1970 (aged 21)		(Ecuador) El Nacional
14	FW	Raul Aviles	17 February 1964 (aged 27)		(Ecuador) Emelec
15	MF	Nixon Carcelén	10 February 1969 (aged 22)		(Ecuador) Deportivo Quito
16	MF	Alex Aguinaga	9 July 1968 (aged 22)		(Mexico) Necaxa
17	FW	Ivo Norman Ron	16 January 1967 (aged 24)		(Ecuador) Emelec
18	MF	Juan Guamán	27 June 1965 (aged 26)		(Ecuador) LDU Quito
19	FW	Manuel Uquillas	19 November 1963 (aged 27)		(Ecuador) Barcelona
20	FW	Ángel Fernández	2 August 1971 (aged 19)		(Ecuador) Green Cross
21	FW	Patricio Hurtado	9 August 1970 (aged 20)		(Ecuador) El Nacional
22	DF	José Rivera	11 January 1963 (aged 28)		(Ecuador) Deportivo Quito

=== Uruguay ===
Head coach: Luis Cubilla

No.	Pos.	Player	Date of birth (age)	Caps	Club
1	GK	Fernando Alvez	4 September 1959 (aged 31)	26	(Uruguay) Peñarol
2	DF	Daniel Revelez	30 September 1959 (aged 31)	15	(Uruguay) Nacional
3	DF	Eber Moas	21 March 1969 (aged 22)	9	(Uruguay) Danubio
4	MF	Guillermo Sanguinetti	21 June 1966 (aged 25)	5	(Uruguay) Racing de Montevideo
5	MF	Ramón Víctor Castro	13 June 1964 (aged 27)	2	(Uruguay) Wanderers
6	DF	Ruben dos Santos	16 November 1969 (aged 21)	5	(Uruguay) Central Español
7	MF	Marcelo Fracchia	4 January 1968 (aged 23)	1	(Uruguay) Central Español
8	MF	Héctor Morán	13 February 1962 (aged 29)	5	(Uruguay) Nacional
9	FW	Peter Méndez	27 January 1964 (aged 27)	3	(Uruguay) Defensor Sporting
10	MF	Henry López Báez	3 July 1967 (aged 24)	6	(Uruguay) Bella Vista
11	FW	Víctor López	9 April 1971 (aged 20)	6	(Uruguay) Peñarol
12	GK	Leonel Rocco	18 September 1966 (aged 24)	0	(Uruguay) CA Progreso
13	DF	Edgar Borges	15 July 1969 (aged 21)	5	(Uruguay) Nacional
14	DF	Daniel Sánchez	3 May 1961 (aged 30)	7	(Uruguay) Danubio
15	DF	José Pintos Saldanha	25 March 1964 (aged 27)	11	(Uruguay) Nacional
16	DF	Álvaro Gutiérrez	21 July 1968 (aged 22)	5	(Uruguay) Bella Vista
17	DF	Héctor Rodríguez Peña	22 October 1968 (aged 22)		(Uruguay) Defensor Sporting
18	MF	Gustavo Ferreyra	29 May 1972 (aged 19)		(Uruguay) Peñarol
19	FW	Sergio Daniel Martínez	15 February 1969 (aged 22)	19	(Uruguay) Defensor Sporting
20	MF	Gabriel Cedrés	3 March 1970 (aged 21)	7	(Uruguay) Peñarol
21	MF	William Gutiérrez	29 March 1963 (aged 28)	4	(Uruguay) Defensor Sporting
22	GK	Luis Barbat	17 June 1968 (aged 23)	0	(Uruguay) Liverpool
