= Becerra =

- Place of origin: Spain

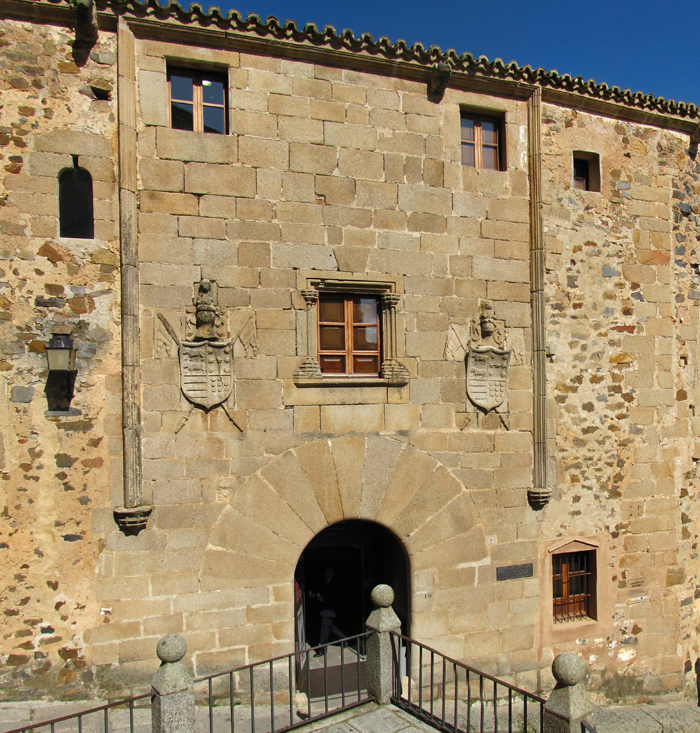
Palacio Casa de los Becerra in Old Town of Cáceres, the Becerra Coat of Arms on the Palace

Becerra is a Spanish surname that means 'young calf’, 'young cow’, ‘heifer', 'taurus', 'brahman'. Notable people with the surname include:

- Alberto Becerra (born 1979), Mexican footballer
- Álvaro Gómez Becerra (1771–1855), Spanish politician
- Antonio Becerra Nieto (c. 1666 to 1725), Captain at Presidio Janos with jurisdiction over Chihuahua, some of New Mexico and some of Arizona and Sonora, father-in-law of Juan Bautista de Anza y Sasoeta, and grandfather of Juan Bautista de Anza Becerra who took settlers including the Verdugos to Los Angeles and the Moragas to San Francisco.
- Ángela Becerra (born 1957), Colombian writer
- Angelica Becerra (born 1990), Mexican artist
- Andrea Becerra (born 2000), Mexican archer
- Arnulfo Becerra (born 1962), Venezuelan footballer
- Bailón Becerra (born 1966), Bolivian cyclist
- Beatriz Becerra (born 1966), Spanish politician and writer
- Camilo Becerra, Colombian swimmer
- Carlos Becerra, numerous people
- Carmen Becerra, Mexican actress
- Elson Becerra (1978–2006), Colombian footballer
- Francisco de Becerra, (born 1510) Spanish nobleman
- Francisco Becerra, Spanish architect
- Gabriel Becerra, (born 1976) Colombian politician and lawyer
- Gaspar Becerra, Spanish painter and sculptor
- Gustavo Becerra-Schmidt, Chilean composer and musicologist
- Héctor Becerra (born 1965), Mexican football player and manager
- Heraldo Becerra, Brazilian footballer
- Hugo Becerra Jr. (born 1996), Mexican racecar driver
- Isaac Becerra (born 1988), Spanish footballer
- Ivan Becerra, Mexican footballer
- José Becerra (1936–2016), Mexican boxer
- Juan Camilo Becerra (born 1998), Colombian footballer
- Juan José Becerra (born 1965), Argentine writer
- Leandra Becerra (born 1887), Mexican revolutionary and supercentenarian
- Leandro Becerra (born 1984), Argentine footballer
- Lourdes Becerra (born 1973), Spanish swimmer
- Lucila Becerra (born 1965), Mexican tennis player
- Marcos E. Becerra (1870–1940), Mexican writer and politician
- Manuel Becerra (settler) (1762–c.1849), Tejano settler and politician in Texas
- María Becerra (born 2000), Argentine singer
- Miguel Becerra (born 1979), Mexican footballer
- Milton Becerra (born 1951), Venezuelan artist
- Nelson Becerra, Peruvian footballer
- Nicolás Becerra (born 1969), Argentine tennis player
- Nicolás Eduardo Becerra (1943–2023), Argentine lawyer and politician
- Óscar Becerra, Mexican footballer
- Raúl Becerra (born 1987), Argentine-born Chilean footballer
- S. Patricia Becerra, Peruvian biochemist
- Xavier Becerra (born 1958), American politician
- Yolanda Becerra (born 1959), Colombian feminist and pacifist activist

== See also ==
- Bezerra, the Portuguese-language surname variant of Becerra
