= Gustavo González =

Gustavo González may refer to:

- Gustavo González Castro (born 1973), Mexican drug lord
- Gustavo González (footballer) (born 1964), Peruvian footballer
- Gustavo González Hernández (born 1970), Mexican politician
- Gustavo González Jure (born 1955), Chilean police officer, director of the Carabineros
- Gustavo González López, Venezuelan politician
- Gustavo González (politician) (born 1975), Argentine politician
- Gustavo González (swimmer) (born 1953), Argentine swimmer
- Gustavo Adolfo González Balderas (born 1959), Mexican politician
