= 1993 Copa América =

- Official poster

Tournament details
- Host country: Ecuador
- Dates: 15 June – 4 July
- Teams: 12 (from 2 confederations)
- Venues: 7 (in 6 host cities)

Final positions
- Champions: Argentina (14th title)
- Runners-up: Mexico
- Third place: Colombia
- Fourth place: Ecuador

Tournament statistics
- Matches played: 26
- Goals scored: 64 (2.46 per match)
- Attendance: 633,040 (24,348 per match)
- Top scorer(s): (Venezuela) José Luis Dolgetta (4 goals)
- Best player: (Argentina) Sergio Goycochea

The 1993 Copa América was the 36th Copa América, CONMEBOL's football tournament for national teams. It was held in Ecuador between 15 June and 4 July. All 10 CONMEBOL members took part, but for the first time two nations from outside CONMEBOL were invited to take part in the tournament, to round out the format. Mexico and the United States, both of CONCACAF, were the invited teams for this tournament. Argentina defeated Mexico in the final 2–1 to win their record 14th continental championship, also their last senior title until 2021.

It was the first edition of the Copa América in which neither Brazil nor Uruguay finished in the top four. This next occurred in 2015.

== Venues ==
Quito	1993 Copa América is located in Ecuador	Ambato
Estadio Olímpico Atahualpa	1993 Copa América is located in Ecuador	Estadio Bellavista
Capacity: 40,948	1993 Copa América is located in Ecuador	Capacity: 22,000
Portoviejo	1993 Copa América is located in Ecuador	Cuenca
Estadio Reales Tamarindos	1993 Copa América is located in Ecuador	Estadio Alejandro Serrano Aguilar
Capacity: 21,000	1993 Copa América is located in Ecuador	Capacity: 22,000
Machala	Guayaquil	
Estadio 9 de Mayo	Estadio Monumental Isidro Romero Carbo	Estadio George Capwell
Capacity: 17,800	Capacity: 59,932	Capacity: 21,594

== Squads ==
For a complete list of all participating squads: 1993 Copa América squads

== Group stage ==
The teams were divided into three groups of four teams each. Each team plays one match against each of the other teams within the same group. Two points are awarded for a win, one point for a draw and zero points for a defeat. First and second placed teams, in each group, advance to the quarter-finals. The two best third place teams also advance to the quarter-finals.

- Tie-breaker
  - If teams finish leveled on points, the following tie-breakers are used:
  1. greater goal difference in all group games;
  2. greater number of goals scored in all group games;
  3. winner of the head-to-head match between the teams in question;
  4. drawing of lots.

=== Group A ===
Pos	Team	Pld	W	D	L	GF	GA	GD	Pts	Qualification
1	Ecuador (H)	3	3	0	0	10	2	+8	6	Advance to knockout stage
2	Uruguay	3	1	1	1	4	4	0	3	Advance to knockout stage
3	Venezuela	3	0	2	1	6	11	−5	2	
4	United States	3	0	1	2	3	6	−3	1	

(H) Hosts
15 June 1993

Ecuador	6–1	Venezuela
Muñoz 19'; Noriega 32'; Fernández 57', 81'; E. Hurtado 65'; Aguinaga 84'		Dolgetta 79'

Estadio Olímpico Atahualpa, Quito
Attendance: 45,000
Referee: Francisco Lamolina (Argentina)
16 June 1993

Uruguay	1–0	United States
Ostolaza 51'

Estadio Bellavista, Ambato
Attendance: 18,000
Referee: Alberto Tejada (Peru)

19 June 1993

Uruguay	2–2	Venezuela
Saralegui 23'; Kanapkis 79'		Dolgetta 10'; Rivas 72'

Estadio Bellavista, Ambato
Attendance: 15,000
Referee: Pablo Peña (Bolivia)
19 June 1993

Ecuador	2–0	United States
Avilés 11'; E. Hurtado 35'

Estadio Olímpico Atahualpa, Quito
Attendance: 45,000
Referee: Iván Guerrero (Chile)

22 June 1993

Venezuela	3–3	United States
Dolgetta 68', 80'; Echenausi 89'		Henderson 21'; Lalas 37'; Kinnear 52'

Estadio Olímpico Atahualpa, Quito
Attendance: 45,000
Referee: Alberto Tejada (Peru)
22 June 1993

Ecuador	2–1	Uruguay
Avilés 28'; Aguinaga 87'		Kanapkis 64'

Estadio Olímpico Atahualpa, Quito
Attendance: 45,000
Referee: Francisco Lamolina (Argentina)

=== Group B ===
Pos	Team	Pld	W	D	L	GF	GA	GD	Pts	Qualification
1	Peru	3	1	2	0	2	1	+1	4	Advance to knockout stage
2	Brazil	3	1	1	1	5	3	+2	3	Advance to knockout stage
3	Paraguay	3	1	1	1	2	4	−2	3	Advance to knockout stage
4	Chile	3	1	0	2	3	4	−1	2	

18 June 1993

Paraguay	1–0	Chile
Cabañas 6'

Estadio Alejandro Serrano Aguilar, Cuenca
Attendance: 20,000
Referee: José Torres (Colombia)
18 June 1993

Brazil	0–0	Peru
	Report

Estadio Alejandro Serrano Aguilar, Cuenca
Attendance: 20,000
Referee: Arturo Carter (Mexico)

21 June 1993

Paraguay	1–1	Peru
Monzón 37'		Del Solar 77'

Estadio Alejandro Serrano Aguilar, Cuenca
Attendance: 20,000
Referee: Ángel Guevara (Ecuador)
21 June 1993

Chile	3–2	Brazil
Sierra 15'; Zambrano 51', 59'	Report	Müller 36'; Palhinha 55'

Estadio Alejandro Serrano Aguilar, Cuenca
Attendance: 23,000
Referee: Alfredo Rodas (Ecuador)

24 June 1993

Peru	1–0	Chile
Del Solar 14' (pen.)

Estadio Alejandro Serrano Aguilar, Cuenca
Attendance: 20,000
Referee: José Torres (Colombia)
24 June 1993

Brazil	3–0	Paraguay
Palhinha 15', 72'; Edmundo 62'	Report

Estadio Alejandro Serrano Aguilar, Cuenca
Attendance: 20,000
Referee: Arturo Carter (Mexico)

=== Group C ===
Pos	Team	Pld	W	D	L	GF	GA	GD	Pts	Qualification
1	Colombia	3	1	2	0	4	3	+1	4	Advance to knockout stage
2	Argentina	3	1	2	0	3	2	+1	4	Advance to knockout stage
3	Mexico	3	0	2	1	2	3	−1	2	Advance to knockout stage
4	Bolivia	3	0	2	1	1	2	−1	2	

16 June 1993

Colombia	2–1	Mexico
Valencia 35'; Aristizábal 87'		Zague 57'

Estadio 9 de Mayo, Machala
Attendance: 10,065
Referee: Jorge Nieves (Uruguay)
Team details

Colombia	Mexico

GK	1	Óscar Córdoba	(yellow card) 45'
RB	4	Luis Fernando Herrera
CB	3	Alexis Mendoza
CB	15	Luis Carlos Perea	(yellow card) 32'
LB	18	Diego Osorio	(yellow card) 63'
RM	6	Gabriel Gómez
CM	10	Leonel Álvarez	(yellow card) 60'	(substituted off) 80'
CM	19	Freddy Rincón
LM	10	Carlos Valderrama
CF	11	Adolfo Valencia
CF	9	Víctor Aristizábal
Substitutes:
MF	16	John Harold Lozano		(substituted on) 80'
DF	2	Óscar Cortés
MF	5	Hermán Gaviria
FW	7	Orlando Maturana
MF	8	Alexis García
GK	12	Farid Mondragón
MF	13	Víctor Pacheco
FW	17	Faustino Asprilla
DF	20	Wilson Pérez
DF	21	Ricardo Pérez
GK	22	José María Pazo
Manager:
Francisco Maturana

GK	1	Jorge Campos
RB	21	Raúl Gutiérrez
CB	2	Claudio Suárez
CB	3	Ramirez Perales	(yellow card) 13'
LB	6	Miguel Herrera
RM	8	Alberto García Aspe
CM	4	Ignacio Ambríz
LM	5	Ramón Ramírez
RW	15	Luis Flores		(substituted off) 52'
CF	9	Hugo Sánchez		(substituted off) 46'
LF	10	Luis García	(yellow card) 54'
Substitutes:
RM	7	David Patiño
LF	11	Luís Roberto Alves		(substituted on) 46'
GK	12	Alejandro García
CM	13	Miguel España
CM	14	Carlos Turrubiates
RB	16	Juan Hernández
LM	17	Benjamín Galindo		(substituted on) 52'
LB	18	Guillermo Muñoz
RF	19	Daniel Guzmán
CB	20	Abraham Nava
GK	22	Nicolás Navarro
Manager:
Miguel Mejía Barón

17 June 1993

Argentina	1–0	Bolivia
Batistuta 53'

Estadio George Capwell, Guayaquil
Attendance: 16,000
Referee: Arturo Angeles (United States)

20 June 1993

Argentina	1–1	Mexico
Ruggeri 28'		Patiño 14'

Estadio George Capwell, Guayaquil
Attendance: 17,000
Referee: Juan Escobar (Paraguay)
Team details

Argentina	Mexico

GK	1	Sergio Goycochea
RB	4	Fabián Basualdo	(yellow card) 9'
CB	6	Oscar Ruggeri (c)
CB	2	Sergio Vázquez
LB	14	Néstor Craviotto
RM	17	Gustavo Zapata	(yellow card) 68'
CM	10	Diego Simeone
CM	5	Fernando Redondo		(substituted off) 81'
LM	20	Leonardo Rodríguez		(substituted off) 56'
CF	9	Gabriel Batistuta
CF	16	Claudio García	(yellow card) 59'
Substitutions:
DF	3	Ricardo Altamirano
FW	7	Ramón Medina Bello
MF	8	Néstor Gorosito		(substituted on) 81'
GK	12	Luis Islas
DF	13	Fernando Cáceres
DF	15	Jorge Borelli
FW	18	Alberto Acosta
FW	19	Julio Alberto Zamora
GK	21	Norberto Scoponi
MF	22	Alejandro Mancuso		(substituted on) 56'
MF	23	Jose Basualdo
Manager:
(Argentina) Alfio Basile

GK	1	Jorge Campos
RB	6	Miguel Herrera
CB	2	Claudio Suarez
CB	3	Ramírez Perales
LB	5	Ramón Ramírez
RM	7	David Patiño	(substituted off) 72'
CM	4	Ignacio Ambríz
CM	8	Garcia Aspe
LM	17	Benjamín Galindo
RF	9	Hugo Sánchez (c)
LF	11	Luís Roberto Alves
Substitutes:
GK	12	Alejandro García
MF	13	Miguel España
MF	14	Carlos Turrubiates
RF	15	Luis Flores
RB	16	Juan Hernandez	(substituted on) 72'
LB	18	Guillermo Muñoz
LF	19	Daniel Guzmán
CB	20	Abraham Nava
LB	21	Raúl Gutiérrez
GK	22	Nicolás Navarro
Manager:
(Mexico) Miguel Mejía Barón

20 June 1993

Colombia	1–1	Bolivia
Maturana 18' (pen.)		Etcheverry 14'

Estadio 9 de Mayo, Machala
Attendance: 11,000
Referee: Márcio Rezende (Brazil)

23 June 1993

Mexico	0–0	Bolivia

Estadio Reales Tamarindos, Portoviejo
Attendance: 4,530
Referee: Jorge Nieves (Uruguay)
Team details

Mexico	Bolivia

GK	1	Jorge Campos
RB	6	Miguel Herrera
CB	2	Claudio Suárez		(substituted off) 65'
CB	3	Juan Ramírez Perales
LB	5	Ramón Ramírez
RM	7	David Patiño
CM	4	Ignacio Ambríz
LM	8	Alberto García Aspe
RW	15	Luis Flores		(substituted off) 67'
CF	9	Hugo Sánchez (c)
LW	10	Luis García
Substitutes:
FW	11	Luís Roberto Alves
GK	12	Alejandro García
MF	13	Miguel España
MF	14	Carlos Turrubiates
DF	16	Juan Hernández
MF	17	Benjamín Galindo		(substituted on) 67'
DF	18	Guillermo Muñoz
FW	19	Daniel Guzmán
DF	20	Abraham Nava
DF	21	Raúl Gutiérrez	(yellow card) 67'	(substituted on) 65'
GK	22	Nicolás Navarro
Manager:
Miguel Mejía Barón

GK	1	Dario Rojas
RB	2	Juan Manuel Peña	(yellow card) 82'
CB	5	Gustavo Quinteros
CB	3	Marco Sandy	(yellow card) 43'
LB	16	Luis Cristaldo
RM	6	Carlos Borja
CM	8	José Melgar
CM	20	Ramiro Castillo		(substituted off) 56'
LM	22	Julio César Baldivieso
CF	9	Álvaro Peña		(substituted off) 71'
CF	10	Marco Etcheverry
Substitutes:
DF	4	Miguel Rimba
FW	7	Johnny Villarroel
FW	11	Jaime Moreno		(substituted on) 71'
GK	12	Marcelo Torrico
DF	13	Modesto Soruco
MF	14	Juan Carlos Ríos
MF	15	Roberto Pérez
FW	17	William Ramallo
DF	18	Miguel Ángel Noro
FW	19	Iván Castillo
FW	21	Erwin Sánchez		(substituted on) 56'
Manager:
(Spain) Xabier Azkargorta

23 June 1993

Argentina	1–1	Colombia
Simeone 2'		Rincón 5'

Estadio George Capwell, Guayaquil
Attendance: 20,000
Referee: Márcio Rezende (Brazil)

=== Ranking of third-placed teams ===
At the end of the first stage, a comparison was made between the third-placed teams of each group. The two third-placed teams with the best results advanced to the quarter-finals.

Pos	Grp	Team	Pld	W	D	L	GF	GA	GD	Pts	Qualification
1	B	Paraguay	3	1	1	1	2	4	−2	3	Advance to knockout stage
2	C	Mexico	3	0	2	1	2	3	−1	2	Advance to knockout stage
3	A	Venezuela	3	0	2	1	6	11	−5	2	

== Knockout stage ==
=== Bracket ===
Quarter-finals
26 June – Quito
Ecuador	3
Paraguay	0
27 June – Quito
Mexico	4
Peru	2
26 June – Guayaquil
Colombia (p)	1 (5)
Uruguay	1 (3)
27 June – Guayaquil
Argentina (p)	1 (6)
Brazil	1 (5)

Semi-finals
30 June – Quito
Ecuador	0
Mexico	2
1 July – Guayaquil
Colombia	0 (5)
Argentina (p)	0 (6)

Final
4 July – Guayaquil
Mexico	1
Argentina	2
Third place
3 July – Portoviejo
Colombia	1
Ecuador	0

=== Quarter-finals ===
26 June 1993

Ecuador	3–0	Paraguay
E. Hurtado 33'; Ramírez 43' (o.g.); Avilés 81'

Estadio Olímpico Atahualpa, Quito
Attendance: 45,000
Referee: Márcio Rezende (Brazil)

26 June 1993

Colombia	1–1	Uruguay
Perea 88'		Saralegui 63'
Penalties
Asprilla (penalty scored); Mendoza (penalty scored); Valderrama (penalty scored); W. Pérez (penalty scored); Valencia (penalty scored)	5–3	(penalty scored) Pelletti; (penalty scored) Saralegui; (penalty missed) Moas; (penalty scored) Siboldi

Estadio Monumental, Guayaquil
Attendance: 12,000
Referee: Juan Escobar (Paraguay)

27 June 1993

Argentina	1–1	Brazil
Rodríguez 69'	Report	Müller 37'
Penalties
Gorosito (penalty scored); Simeone (penalty scored); Rodríguez (penalty scored); Acosta (penalty scored); Medina Bello (penalty scored); Borelli (penalty scored)	6–5	(penalty scored) Zinho; (penalty scored) Cafu; (penalty scored) Müller; (penalty scored) Roberto Carlos; (penalty scored) Luisinho; (penalty missed) Boiadeiro

Estadio Monumental, Guayaquil
Attendance: 25,000
Referee: Alberto Tejada (Peru)

27 June 1993

Mexico	4–2	Peru
García Aspe 22' (pen.), 44'; Zague 43'; Patiño 49'		Del Solar 55' (pen.); Reynoso 82'

Estadio Olímpico Atahualpa, Quito
Attendance: 17,340
Referee: Iván Guerrero (Chile)
Team details

Mexico	Peru

GK	1	Jorge Campos
RB	21	Raúl Gutiérrez
CB	2	Claudio Suárez
CB	3	Juan Ramírez Perales
LB	5	Ramón Ramírez	(yellow card) 86'
RM	7	David Patiño		(substituted off) 69'
CM	4	Ignacio Ambríz
CM	8	Alberto García Aspe
LM	17	Benjamín Galindo		(substituted off) 68'
RF	9	Hugo Sánchez (c)
LF	11	Luís Roberto Alves
Substitutes:
LB	6	Miguel Herrera
RF	10	Luis García		(substituted on) 68'
GK	12	Alejandro García
CM	13	Miguel España
CM	14	Carlos Turrubiates
RF	15	Luis Flores		(substituted on) 69'
RB	16	Juan Hernández
CB	18	Guillermo Muñoz
LF	19	Daniel Guzmán
CB	20	Abraham Nava
GK	22	Nicolás Navarro
Manager:
Miguel Mejía Barón

GK	1	Miguel Miranda
RB	16	César Charún	(yellow card) 87'
CB	3	Juan Reynoso (c)	(yellow card) 41'
CB	5	José Soto	(yellow card) 4'
LB	4	Percy Olivares
RM	18	Alvaro Barco
CM	8	José del Solar
CM	14	Roberto Martínez		(substituted off) 46'
LM	10	Pablo Zegarra
CF	11	Julio César Rivera
CF	7	Flavio Maestri		(substituted off) 53'
Substitutes:
MF	19	Germán Carty	(yellow card) 69'	(substituted on) 53'
MF	15	Roberto Palacios		(substituted on) 46'
DF	9	Andrés González
GK	12	Juan Carlos Zubczuk
FW	13	Mario Rodríguez
DF	2	Jorge Soto
MF	6	José Luis Carranza
FW	20	Waldir Sáenz
GK	21	Agapito Rodríguez
Manager:
(Federal Republic of Yugoslavia) Vladimir Popović

=== Semi-finals ===
30 June 1993

Mexico	2–0	Ecuador
Sánchez 23'; R. Ramírez 54'

Estadio Olímpico Atahualpa, Quito
Attendance: 45,105
Referee: Alberto Tejada (Peru)
Team details

Mexico	Ecuador

GK	1	Jorge Campos
RB	21	Raúl Gutiérrez	(yellow card) 18'
DF	2	Claudio Suárez	(yellow card) 58'
DF	3	Juan Ramírez Perales	(yellow card) 77'
LB	5	Ramón Ramírez
RM	7	David Patiño		(substituted off) 65'
CM	4	Ignacio Ambríz
CM	8	Alberto García Aspe
LM	17	Benjamín Galindo	(yellow card) 4'	(substituted off) 57'
RF	9	Hugo Sánchez (c)	(yellow card) 48'
LF	11	Luís Roberto Alves	(yellow card) 45'
Substitutes:
LB	6	Miguel Herrera		(substituted on) 57'
RF	10	Luis García
GK	12	Alejandro García
CM	13	Miguel España
CM	14	Carlos Turrubiates
RF	15	Luis Flores		(substituted on) 65'
RB	16	Juan Hernández
LB	18	Guillermo Muñoz
LF	19	Daniel Guzmán
CB	20	Abraham Nava
GK	22	Nicolás Navarro
Manager:
Miguel Mejía Barón

GK	1	Jacinto Espinoza
RB	20	Iván Hurtado	(yellow card) 67'
CB	22	Raúl Noriega
CB	6	Luis Capurro (c)
LB	7	Carlos Muñoz	(yellow card) 43'
RM	5	Héctor Carabalí
CM	8	Nixon Carcelén
LM	10	Álex Aguinaga
RF	11	Ángel Fernández		(substituted off) 68'
CF	9	Eduardo Hurtado
LF	14	Raúl Avilés		(substituted off) 55'
Substitutes:
DF	2	Jimmy Montanero
DF	3	Hólger Quiñónez
DF	4	Byron Tenorio
GK	12	Víctor Mendoza
DF	13	Máximo Tenorio
FW	15	José Gavica		(substituted on) 68'
MF	16	Kléber Chalá		(substituted on) 55'
MF	17	Eduardo Zambrano
DF	18	Dannes Coronel
MF	19	Luis Chérrez
DF	21	José María Guerrero
Manager:
(Federal Republic of Yugoslavia) Dušan Drašković

1 July 1993

Argentina	0–0	Colombia
Penalties
Gorosito (penalty scored); Batistuta (penalty scored); Simeone (penalty scored); Rodríguez (penalty scored); Acosta (penalty scored); Borelli (penalty scored)	6–5	(penalty scored) Rincón; (penalty scored) Asprilla; (penalty scored) Mendoza; (penalty scored) W. Pérez; (penalty scored) Valderrama; (penalty missed) Aristizábal

Estadio Monumental, Guayaquil
Attendance: 15,000
Referee: Jorge Nieves (Uruguay)

=== Third-place match ===
3 July 1993

Ecuador	0–1	Colombia
		Valencia 86'

Estadio Reales Tamarindos, Portoviejo
Attendance: 18,000
Referee: Álvaro Arboleda (Venezuela)

=== Final ===
4 July 1993

Argentina	2–1	Mexico
Batistuta 63', 74'		Galindo 67' (pen.)

Estadio Monumental, Guayaquil
Attendance: 41,000
Referee: Márcio Rezende (Brazil)

== Goal scorers ==
With four goals, José Luis Dolgetta was the top scorer in the tournament. There were 64 goals scored in 26 matches, for an average of 2.46 goals per match.

4 goals

- (Venezuela) José Luis Dolgetta

3 goals

- (Argentina) Gabriel Batistuta
- (Brazil) Palhinha
- (Ecuador) Ney Avilés
- (Ecuador) Eduardo Hurtado
- (Peru) José del Solar

2 goals

- (Brazil) Müller
- (Chile) Richard Zambrano
- (Colombia) Adolfo Valencia
- (Ecuador) Álex Aguinaga
- (Ecuador) Ángel Fernández
- (Mexico) Zague
- (Mexico) Alberto García Aspe
- (Mexico) David Patiño
- (Uruguay) Fernando Kanapkis
- (Uruguay) Marcelo Saralegui

1 goal

- (Argentina) Leonardo Rodríguez
- (Argentina) Oscar Ruggeri
- (Argentina) Diego Simeone
- (Bolivia) Marco Etcheverry
- (Brazil) Edmundo
- (Chile) José Luis Sierra
- (Colombia) Víctor Aristizábal
- (Colombia) Orlando Maturana
- (Colombia) Luis Carlos Perea
- (Colombia) Freddy Rincón
- (Ecuador) Carlos Antonio Muñoz
- (Ecuador) Raúl Noriega
- (Mexico) Benjamín Galindo
- (Mexico) Ramón Ramírez
- (Mexico) Hugo Sánchez
- (Paraguay) Roberto Cabañas
- (Paraguay) Luis Monzón
- (Peru) Juan Reynoso
- (Uruguay) Santiago Ostolaza
- (United States) Alexi Lalas
- (United States) Chris Henderson
- (United States) Dominic Kinnear
- (Venezuela) Miguel Echenausi
- (Venezuela) Stalin Rivas

1 own goal

- (Paraguay) Mario Ramírez (against Ecuador)

== Final positions ==
Pos	Team	Pld	W	D	L	GF	GA	GD	Pts	Eff
1	Argentina	6	2	4	0	6	4	+2	8	66.7%
2	Mexico	6	2	2	2	9	7	+2	6	50.0%
3	Colombia	6	2	4	0	6	4	+2	8	66.7%
4	Ecuador	6	4	0	2	13	5	+8	8	66.7%
Eliminated in the Quarterfinals
5	Brazil	4	1	2	1	6	4	+2	4	50.0%
6	Uruguay	4	1	2	1	5	5	0	4	50.0%
7	Peru	4	1	2	1	4	5	−1	4	50.0%
8	Paraguay	4	1	1	2	2	7	−5	3	37.5%
Eliminated in the First Stage
9	Chile	3	1	0	2	3	4	−1	2	33.3%
10	Bolivia	3	0	2	1	1	2	−1	2	33.3%
11	Venezuela	3	0	2	1	6	11	−5	2	33.3%
12	United States	3	0	1	2	3	6	−3	1	16.7%
