= Bezerra =

Bezerra may refer to:

- Bezerra (fungus), genus
- Bezerra (surname)
- Bezerra da Silva (1927–2005), Brazilian samba musician
- Bezerra (footballer, born 1949), Brazilian footballer

== See also ==
- Bezerra River (disambiguation)
- Bezerrão, a sports stadium in Brazil
- Bezerros, a municipality in Brazil
