= Henry López =

Henry López may refer to:

- Henry López Báez (born 1967), Uruguayan footballer
- Henry López (footballer, born 1992), Guatemalan footballer

== See also ==
- Henry Lopes (disambiguation)
- Enrique López (disambiguation)
