= Rodrigo Gómez =

Rodrigo Gómez may refer to:

- Rodrigo Gómez (Castilian nobleman) (died 1146), Castilian nobleman and military leader
- Rodrigo Gómez de Traba (1201–1260), Galician nobleman
- Rodrigo Gómez (Chilean footballer) (born 1968), Chilean football midfielder
- Rodrigo Gómez (footballer, born 1981), Uruguayan football defender
- Rodrigo Gómez (Argentine footballer) (born 1993), Argentine football midfielder
