= Rodallega =

Rodallega is a surname. Notable people with the surname include:

- Carmen Rodallega (born 1983), Colombian footballer
- Hugo Rodallega (born 1985), Colombian footballer
- Robert Rodallega (born 1969), Venezuelan footballer
