= Nicolás Navarro =

Nicolas Navarro may refer to:

- Nicolás Navarro (Argentine footballer) (born 1985), Argentine football goalkeeper
- Nicolás Navarro (Mexican footballer) (born 1963), Mexican football goalkeeper
- Nicolas Navarro (racing driver), French racing driver in events such as the 2008 Speedcar Series
- Nicolas Navarro (runner) (born 1991), French long-distance runner
