= Juan Carlos Madrid =

Chilean footballer

Personal information
- Full name: Juan Carlos Madrid Vidal
- Date of birth: 20 October 1975 (age 51)
- Place of birth: Valdivia, Chile
- Height: 1.72 m (5 ft 8 in)
- Position: Forward

Youth career
- Deportes Temuco

Senior career*
Years	Team	Apps	(Gls)
1993–1994	Deportes Temuco	7	(2)
1994–2000	Universidad Católica	31	(12)
1997	→ Coquimbo Unido (loan)	28	(10)
1998	→ Deportes Concepción (loan)	22	(10)
1999	→ Deportes Puerto Montt (loan)	36	(16)
2001–2003	Cobreloa	92	(19)
2004	Deportes La Serena	17	(6)
2005–2006	Deportes Temuco	43	(6)
2006	Alianza	11	(4)

International career
1995	Chile U20		
- * Club domestic league appearances and goals

Juan Carlos Madrid Vidal (born 20 October 1975) is a Chilean former professional footballer who played as a forward for clubs in Chile and El Salvador.

== Club career ==
A product of Deportes Temuco youth system, Madrid made his senior debut in 1993 and took part of the squad in two stints: 1992–94, 2005–06.

After his first stint with Deportes Temuco, he joined Universidad Católica in 1994, making appearances for the club until 1996 and also in 2000.

In 1997, 1998 and 1999 he played for Coquimbo Unido, Deportes Concepción and Deportes Puerto Montt respectively.

From 2001 to 2003, Madrid had a successful stint with Cobreloa.

In 2004, he played for Deportes La Serena.

In 2005, he played for Deportes Temuco when the club was relegated to the second level of the Chilean football, so he spent a half year in the 2006 Primera B, scoring four goals.

Abroad, he played for the Salvadoran club Alianza on second half 2006.

== International career ==
He represented Chile at under-20 level in both the 1995 South American Championship and the 1995 FIFA World Youth Championship.

== Personal life ==
Madrid is nicknamed Gato (Cat) since his signing for Universidad Católica, a nickname given by his then teammate Rodrigo Gómez because of his supposed resemblance to that animal.

== Post-retirement ==
A kinesiologist who graduted from the Autonomous University of Chile, Madrid worked for about nine years in the United States in soccer until he returned to Chile in 2025. In that country, he also graduated as a football coach.
