= Daniel Vaca =

Bolivian footballer (born 1978)

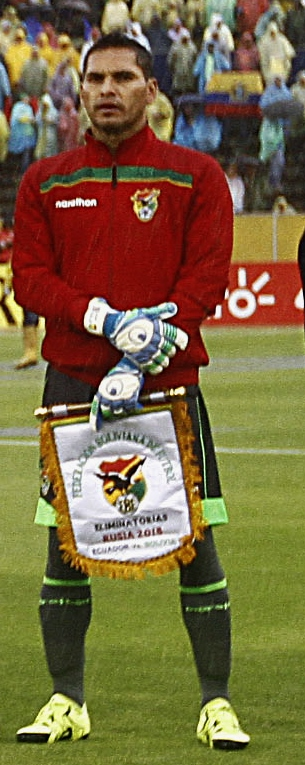
- Vaca in 2015

Personal information
- Full name: Daniel Vaca Tasca
- Date of birth: 3 November 1978 (age 48)
- Place of birth: Santa Cruz de la Sierra, Bolivia
- Height: 1.78 m (5 ft 10 in)
- Position: Goalkeeper

Team information
- Current team: The Strongest (president of football committee)

Youth career
- 1995–1998: Blooming

Senior career*
Years	Team	Apps	(Gls)
1998–2005	Blooming	3	(0)
2002	→ Oriente Petrolero (loan)	3	(0)
2003–2004	→ Destroyers (loan)	0	(0)
2006–2009	San José	133	(0)
2010	Jorge Wilstermann	45	(0)
2011–2021	The Strongest	385	(1)
2022	Royal Pari	14	(0)
Total		583	(1)

International career
2010–2019	Bolivia	16	(0)

Managerial career
- 2026: The Strongest (interim)
- * Club domestic league appearances and goals

Daniel Vaca (born 3 November 1978) is a Bolivian football coach and former player who played as a goalkeeper. He is the current president of The Strongest's football committee.

Vaca played for The Strongest for a full decade, from 2011 until 2021. He also earned 16 caps for the Bolivian national team in the 2010s.

== Early life ==
During his youth, Vaca played as a forward, making his debut under the sticks at the age of 13, in an inter-neighborhood championship final organized by the Tahuichi Academy, only because the team's starting goalkeeper was not allowed to go due to a storm. As a forward, he was able to anticipate the opposing attackers, making several saves to help his side win the final, after which the Tahuichi Academy gave him a scholarship to train as a goalkeeper, where he was taught the basics of that position by Erwin Frey, a longtime Blooming goalkeeper.

== Club career ==
=== Early career ===
Having joined the ranks of Blooming as a teenager in the mid-1990s, Vaca made his debut in the Bolivian Primera División on 12 December 1999, aged 21, in a 1–1 draw with his future club The Strongest. Unsatisfied with his lack of playing time, he left the club in 2005, joining San José ahead of the 2006 season, with whom he played until 2009.

=== The Strongest ===
Vaca signed for The Strongest in 2011. During the first half of a derby against Bolívar on 30 October 2016, Vaca set a club record for the most minutes without conceding a single goal, breaking the previous one set at 706 minutes by Paraguayan Miguel Gariazú and Chilean Víctor Aragón in 1989; he extended the record until 737 minutes, when he conceded a goal from Juanmi Callejón in the second-half. On 4 August 2017, he made his 300th appearance for The Strongest in a match that included a hat-trick and the debut of three young players. Five days later, on 9 August, Vaca made his 50th Copa Libertadores appearance in a loss to Lanús, becoming the goalkeeper with the most such appearances in Strongest's history.

On 27 October 2018, he made his 297th appearance for The Strongest in a match against Destroyers, surpassing Luis Galarza as the player with the most appearances for the club. The following month, on 30 November, Vaca made his 300th appearance for The Strongest in Bolivian tournaments in a match against Bolívar, wearing the captain's armband in the absence of the red-carded Pablo Escobar and helping his side to a 1–1 draw.

On 30 September 2019, Vaca made his 400th appearance for The Strongest in a 6–1 league thrashing of his former club Blooming. He won the award for Best Goalkeeper of the 2019 season, in which he started in 51 of the 52 league matches, missing only one because of yellow cards accumulation. By late 2020, he was one of only three 40-year-old players in the Bolivian top-flight, the others being Carlos Saucedo and Martín Palavicini.

On 13 March 2021, Vaca made his 439th appearances with the Strongest in a top-tier league match against Independiente, surpassing Escobar's tally of 438 to became the player with the most official matches in the club's history, and two months later, on 18 May, he made his 56th Copa Libertadores appearance for The Strongest in a 2–1 victory over Brazilian side Santos, surpassing Escobar's tally of 55 to became the player with the most such appearances in the club's history. On 25 July, he started in his 41st Bolivian Superclásico against Bolívar, becoming, at the age of 42 years, 8 months, and 22 days, the oldest-ever player in the history of the Bolivian Superclásico, breaking a 53-year-old record set by Víctor Ugarte in 1968, aged 42 years, 5 months, and 8 days.

In early 2022, Vaca left the club after 11 years, having won 5 titles, including three Bolivian top-flight titles (2012–13, 2013–14, and 2016–17), and playing in 10 consecutive editions of the Copa Libertadores.

=== Royal Pari ===
On 9 February 2022, the 43-year-old Vaca signed for Royal Pari, with whom he played in the 2022 Copa Sudamericana, starting in both legs of the first stage against Oriente Petrolero in March, becoming, at the age of 43 years and 4 months, the oldest-ever player in the competition's history, surpassing Richard Pellejero's record set in 2019, aged 43 years and 1 day.

== International career ==
In total, Vaca earned 16 caps for the Bolivian national team between 2010 and 2019, the last of which on 10 September, in a friendly match against Ecuador, becoming, at the age of 40 years, 10 months, and 8 days, the oldest-ever player in the history of the national team, surpassed Carlos Trucco's record set in the 1994 FIFA World Cup at the age of 40 years, 3 months, and 5 days.

In January 2022, Vaca, now a free agent, was surprisingly called up by coach César Farías for three matches during that month, including two World Cup qualifiers, becoming, at the age of 43, the oldest player in any CONMEBOL squad; he remained an unused substitute in every game.

== Personal life ==
In 2002, Vaca married Marcela del Río Ossandon, with whom he had four children: Daniela, Gabriela, Mathías, and Adrián.
