= Burbano =

Burbano is a surname. Notable people with the name include:

- Alfredo Ernesto Poveda Burbano (1926–1990), Interim President of Ecuador
- Fáider Burbano (born 1992), Colombian professional footballer
- Hernán Burbano (born 1988), Colombian professional footballer
- Juan Carlos Burbano (born 1969), Ecuadorian footballer and manager
- Robert Burbano (born 1995), Ecuadorian footballer
- Robert Burbano (footballer, born 1970) (born 1970), Ecuadorian footballer
