= Ernesto Aguirre =

Ernesto Aguirre may refer to:

- Ernesto Aguirre (footballer) (born 1963), Peruvian international footballer
- Ernesto Aguirre (tennis), Chilean Davis Cup tennis player
