= Gustavo Hernández =

Gustavo Hernández may refer to:

- Gustavo Hernández Pérez (born 1974), Venezuelan film director and writer
- Gustavo Hernández Ibañez (born 1973), Uruguayan film director and writer
- Gustavo Ramos Hernández (born 1974), Mexican equestrian
- Gustavo González Hernández (born 1970), Mexican politician
