= Jose Rivera =

Jose Rivera may refer to:

- José Antonio Primo de Rivera (1903–1936), Spanish politician
- José Eustasio Rivera (1888–1928), Colombian politician and writer
- José Rivera (playwright) (born 1955), American playwright
- José Antonio Rivera (born 1973), Puerto Rican-American boxer
- Jose Rivera (politician) (born 1936), American politician
- José Rivera (ski jumper) (born 1962), Spanish Olympic ski jumper
- José Rivera (volleyball) (born 1977), Puerto Rican volleyball player
- José de Rivera (1904–1985), American sculptor
- José Luis Rivera Guerra (born 1973), Puerto Rican politician
- José Rivera Díaz, Puerto Rican politician, former mayor of Trujillo Alto, Puerto Rico
- José Manuel Rivera (born 1986), Mexican football striker
- José Rivera, Puerto Rican arsonist related to the Dupont Plaza Hotel arson fire of December 31, 1986
- Jose Luis Rivera (1960–2022), Puerto Rican professional wrestler
- José Rivera (Peruvian footballer) (born 1997), Peruvian football winger
- José Rivera (Ecuadorian footballer) (born 1963), Ecuadorian footballer
