= Diosdado Palma =

Peruvian footballer (born 1965)

Personal information
- Date of birth: 1 April 1965 (age 61)

International career
Years	Team	Apps	(Gls)
1991	Peru	1	(0)

Diosdado Palma (born 1 April 1965) is a Peruvian footballer. He played in one match for the Peru national football team in 1991. He was also part of Peru's squad for the 1991 Copa América tournament.
