= Juan Carlos Chávez (Bolivian footballer) =

Bolivian footballer (born 1972)

Personal information
- Date of birth: 11 December 1972 (age 53)
- Position: Defender

International career
Years	Team	Apps	(Gls)
1991–1995	Bolivia	8	(0)

Juan Carlos Chávez (born 11 December 1972) is a Bolivian former footballer. He played in eight matches for the Bolivia national football team from 1991 to 1995. He was also part of Bolivia's squad for the 1991 Copa América tournament.
