= Enrique López =

Enrique López may refer to:

- Enrique López Maqueira (1865–1918), Chilean politician and diplomat
- Enrique López Albújar (1872–1966), Peruvian writer
- Enrique López Albujar Trint (1930–1990), Peruvian Army officer and politician
- Enriquito López (1956–2016), Dominican politician
- Enrique López Zarza (born 1957), Mexican football forward
- Enrique López López (born 1963), Spanish judge and politician
- Enrique López Lavigne (born 1969), Spanish film producer
- Kike López (born 1988), Spanish football right-back
- Enrique López Pérez (born 1991), Spanish tennis player
- Enrique López Fernández (born 1995), Spanish football left-back better known as Cadete

== See also ==
- Henry López (disambiguation)
