= Orlando Maturana =

Colombian footballer (born 1965)

Personal information
- Full name: Orlando Maturana Vargas
- Date of birth: 11 October 1965 (age 61)
- Place of birth: Barranquilla, Colombia
- Position: Forward

Senior career*
Years	Team	Apps	(Gls)
1984–1985	Atlético Bucaramanga		
1986–1993	América de Cali	214	(68)
1994	Millonarios	45	(12)
1994–1995	Club Atlético Independiente	5	(0)
1996–1997	Deportes Tolima	44	(11)
1998	Millonarios	48	(12)
1999	Deportes Tolima	29	(7)
2000	América de Cali	12	(6)
2001	Club Olimpia		
2002	Independiente Santa Fe	8	(2)

International career
1993–2000	Colombia	2	(1)
- * Club domestic league appearances and goals

Orlando Maturana Vargas (born 11 October 1965) is a Colombian former footballer.

== International career ==
Maturana made several appearances for the senior Colombia national football team, including four matches at the 1993 Copa América. He officially represented the Colombia national football team in 6 occasions. He also made several appearances for the Colombia national team in unofficial games, most notably in 1993 against Bayern Munich and Palmeiras. Orlando Maturana was a prolific and creative goal scorer who earn a reputation as a poacher. His success in the national team was hampered by the availability of several more successful strikers such as Iván Valenciano, Antony de Ávila, John Jairo Trellez, Víctor Aristizábal, Luis Zuleta, Faustino Asprilla, Adolfo Valencia, and several other members of what is known today as the Colombian dream generation.
