= José Luis Dolgetta =

Venezuelan footballer (1970–2023)

Personal information
- Full name: José Luis Dolgetta Ascanio
- Date of birth: 1 August 1970
- Place of birth: Valencia, Carabobo, Venezuela
- Date of death: 31 October 2023 (aged 53)
- Place of death: Guayaquil, Ecuador
- Height: 1.78 m (5 ft 10 in)
- Position: Forward

Senior career*
Years	Team	Apps	(Gls)
1990–1991	Valencia		
1991–1992	ULA Mérida		
1992–1993	Caracas		
1993–1994	Unicol Lagunillas		
1994–1995	Estudiantes Mérida		
1995–1996	Caracas		
1996	Valencia		
1996–1997	Atlético Zulia		
1997–1998	Estudiantes Mérida		
1998	Carabobo		
1999–2000	Estudiantes La Plata	0	(0)
2000	Carabobo		
2000	Técnico Universitario		

International career
1993–1997	Venezuela	20	(6)

Managerial career
- 2015: Deportivo Anzoátegui
- 2016–2017: Tucanes de Amazonas
- * Club domestic league appearances and goals

José Luis Dolgetta Ascanio (1 August 1970 – 31 October 2023) was a Venezuelan professional football player and manager who played as a forward for clubs in Venezuela, Argentina and Ecuador. At international level, he made 20 appearances for the Venezuela national team scoring six goals.

== Death ==
Dolgetta died from a heart attack in Guayaquil, Ecuador, on 31 October 2023, at the age of 53.

== Career statistics ==
Appearances and goals by national team and year
National team	Year	Apps	Goals
Venezuela	1993	11	4
Venezuela	1994	0	0
Venezuela	1995	5	2
Venezuela	1996	3	0
Venezuela	1997	1	0
Total		20	6

Scores and results list Venezuela's goal tally first, score column indicates score after each Dolgetta goal.

List of international goals scored by José Luis Dolgetta
No.	Date	Venue	Opponent	Score	Result	Competition
1	15 June 1993	Estadio Olímpico Atahualpa, Quito, Ecuador	Ecuador	1–4	1–6	1993 Copa América
2	19 June 1993	Estadio Bellavista, Ambato, Ecuador	Uruguay	1–0	2–2	1993 Copa América
3	22 June 1993	Estadio Bellavista, Ambato, Ecuador	United States	1–3	3–3	1993 Copa América
4	22 June 1993	Estadio Bellavista, Ambato, Ecuador	United States	2–3	3–3	1993 Copa América
5	5 July 1995	Estadio Centenario, Estadio Centenario, Uruguay	Uruguay	1–2	1–4	1995 Copa América
6	12 July 1995	Estadio Domingo Burgueño, Maldonado, Uruguay	Paraguay	2–2	2–3	1995 Copa América
