= Bezerra (surname) =

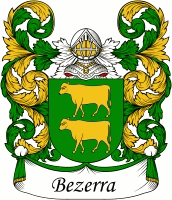

Bezerra is a Portuguese surname of Hebrew ancestry, popular among the Sephardi Jewish settlers in Northern Portugal. The name translates to 'heifer'. The first members of this family have origins in Ponte de Lima, the oldest Portuguese village, and can be traced back to the century XII.

By the early 1500s, Jews in Portugal were told that they had either to convert to Catholicism or leave the country, and while many converted by choice and embraced their new faith, others were faced with forced conversions, which led to false adherence to Catholicism in public with continued observance of Judaism in private (also known as Crypto-Jews, or "Jews without a past"). These converted Jews were commonly called 'New Christians', 'Marranos' or 'Conversos'. The Bezerra family name has been historically recognized as a 'converso' lineage of ethnic Jews converted to the Catholic Church.

The 'conversos', although remaining as Portuguese subjects, but eager to escape to as far as possible from the Portuguese Inquisition, started leaving Portugal for other countries. While some preferred the Portuguese colonies in Africa and Asia, most chose Brazil as their new home, and were responsible for penetrating deep into the Brazilian backcountry and developing the land through successfully establishing sugarcane plantations, cattle farms, mills and trading businesses.

The 'conversos' Antonio Martins Bezerra and his wife Maria Martins Bezerra were amongst the first Portuguese settlers in Brazil, having arrived at the then newly acquired colony in 1535. Nowadays, people with the Bezerra surname are found mostly in the Northeast of Brazil.

== Famous People ==
Famous people bearing this surname include:

- Adolfo Bezerra de Menezes Cavalcanti (1831–1900), Brazilian physician, journalist, politician and book writer
- Allyson Bezerra (born 1992), Brazilian politician
- Ed Benes — José Edilbenes Bezerra (born 1972), Brazilian comics book artist
- Edir Macedo Bezerra (born 1945), Brazilian Billionaire entrepreneur
- Eliana Michaelichen Bezerra (born 1973), Brazilian TV host
- Fátima Bezerra (born 1955), Brazilian politician, former Senator and currently Governor of the state of Rio Grande do Norte
- Fernando Bezerra (born 1941), Brazilian entrepreneur and politician (page in Portuguese)
- José Bezerra da Silva (1927–2005), Brazilian samba singer
- Juan Bautista de Anza Bezerra Nieto (1736–1788), Novo-Spanish explorer
- Oscar Daniel Bezerra Schmidt (born 1958), retired Brazilian basketball player
- Teodorico Bezerra (1903–1994), Brazilian landowner, entrepreneur and politician (page in Portuguese)
- Wendel Bezerra (born 1974), Brazilian actor, voice actor, dubbing director and announcer (page in Portuguese)
- William Bezerra, Brazilian professional boxer
- Zila Bezerra (born 1945), Brazilian teacher and politician

== See also ==
- Becerra, the Spanish-language surname variant of Bezerra
