= Carlos Castro (Venezuelan footballer) =

Venezuelan footballer (born 1968)

Personal information
- Date of birth: 18 March 1968 (age 58)

International career
Years	Team	Apps	(Gls)
1991	Venezuela	3	(0)

Carlos Castro (born 18 March 1968) is a Venezuelan footballer. He played in three matches for the Venezuela national football team in 1991. He was also part of Venezuela's squad for the 1991 Copa América tournament.
