= Juan Francisco Escobar =

Paraguayan football referee

- Full name: Juan Francisco Escobar
- Born: 31 January 1949 (age 77); Paraguay

Domestic
Years	League	Role

International
Years	League	Role
1985–1994	FIFA listed	Referee

Juan Francisco Escobar (born January 31, 1949) is a former Paraguayan football referee.

A former FIFA referee, Escobar supervised matches during the 1985 FIFA World Youth Championship, the 1992 Olympic tournament, and the 1991 and 1993 Copa América tournaments. He also served as a referee in qualifying matches for the 1986 and 1994 World Cups.
