= Fernando Kanapkis =

Uruguayan football player (born 1966)

Personal information
- Full name: Fernando Alfredo Kanapkis García
- Date of birth: 6 June 1966 (age 60)
- Place of birth: Montevideo, Uruguay
- Height: 1.92 m (6 ft 4 in)
- Position: Defender

Senior career*
Years	Team	Apps	(Gls)
1982–1986	Fénix		
1986–1991	Danubio		
1991	Textil Mandiyú		
1992	Nacional		
1992	Danubio		
1993	Textil Mandiyú		
1994	Atlético Mineiro		
1995	Nacional		
1996	Huracán Buceo		
1997	Nacional		
1998	Rampla Juniors		
1999–2000	Paysandú Bella Vista		
2001–2003	Racing Montevideo		

International career
1992–1993	Uruguay	20	(5)
- * Club domestic league appearances and goals

Fernando Alfredo Kanapkis García (born 6 June 1966) is a Uruguayan retired footballer who played as a defender. He was part of Uruguay national team at 1993 Copa América.

== Career statistics ==
=== International ===
National team	Year	Apps	Goals
Uruguay	1992	6	1
Uruguay	1993	14	4
Total		20	5
