= César Marcano (footballer) =

Venezuelan footballer (born 1957)

Personal information
- Date of birth: 31 October 1957 (age 68)

International career
Years	Team	Apps	(Gls)
1991	Venezuela	3	(0)

César Marcano (born 31 October 1957) is a Venezuelan footballer. He played in three matches for the Venezuela national football team in 1991. He was also part of Venezuela's squad for the 1991 Copa América tournament.
