= Agapito Rodríguez =

Peruvian footballer (born 1965)

Personal information
- Full name: Agapito Rodríguez Bermejo
- Date of birth: 16 March 1965 (age 61)
- Place of birth: Ica, Peru
- Height: 1.87 m (6 ft 2 in)
- Position: Goalkeeper

Senior career*
Years	Team	Apps	(Gls)
- Hijos de Yurimaguas
- Alianza Lima
- Defensor Lima
- Unión Huaral

International career
1993	Peru	1	(0)
- * Club domestic league appearances and goals

Agapito Rodríguez Bermejo (born 16 March 1965) is a Peruvian former footballer who played as a goalkeeper. He made one appearance for the Peru national team in 1993. He was also part of Peru's squad for the 1993 Copa América tournament.
