= José Flores (Venezuelan footballer) =

Venezuelan footballer (born 1967)

Personal information
- Date of birth: 28 June 1967 (age 59)

International career
Years	Team	Apps	(Gls)
1991	Venezuela	1	(0)

José Flores (born 28 June 1967) is a Venezuelan footballer. He played in one match for the Venezuela national football team in 1991. He was also part of Venezuela's squad for the 1991 Copa América tournament.
