= Sergio Rivero (footballer) =

Bolivian footballer (1963–2024)

Personal information
- Full name: Sergio Rivero Kuhn
- Date of birth: 6 December 1963
- Place of birth: Santa Cruz de la Sierra, Bolivia
- Date of death: 1 September 2024 (aged 60)
- Place of death: Santa Cruz de la Sierra, Bolivia
- Position: Defender

Senior career*
Years	Team	Apps	(Gls)
1983–1990	Real Santa Cruz		
1991–1995	Oriente Petrolero		
1996	Real Santa Cruz		
1997–1998	Oriente Petrolero		
1999	Club Deportivo Guabirá		

International career
1991–1993	Bolivia	9	(0)
- * Club domestic league appearances and goals

Sergio Rivero Kuhn (6 December 1963 – 1 September 2024) was a Bolivian footballer who played as a defender. He made nine appearances for the Bolivia national team from 1991 to 1993. He was also part of Bolivia's squad for the 1991 Copa América tournament. Rivero died in Santa Cruz de la Sierra on 1 September 2024, at the age of 60.
