= Freddy Bravo =

Ecuadorian footballer (born 1962)

Personal information
- Date of birth: 12 April 1962 (age 64)
- Position: Midfielder

International career
Years	Team	Apps	(Gls)
1987–1991	Ecuador	11	(0)

Freddy Bravo (born 12 April 1962) is an Ecuadorian former footballer. He played in eleven matches for the Ecuador national football team from 1987 to 1991. He was also part of Ecuador's squad for the 1991 Copa América tournament.
