= Martín Ramírez (footballer) =

Peruvian footballer (born 1969)

Personal information
- Date of birth: 8 August 1969 (age 57)

International career
| Years | Team | Apps | (Gls) |
| 1989–1991 | Peru | 2 | (0) |

Martín Ramírez (born 8 August 1969) is a Peruvian footballer. He played in two matches for the Peru national football team from 1989 to 1991. He was also part of Peru's squad for the 1991 Copa América tournament.
