= Alejandro García (footballer, born 1961) =

Mexican footballer

Personal information
- Full name: Luis Alejandro García Barrera
- Date of birth: 26 February 1961 (age 65)
- Place of birth: Monterrey, Mexico
- Height: 1.81 m (5 ft 11 1/2 in)
- Position: Goalkeeper

Senior career*
Years	Team	Apps	(Gls)
1985–1988	Deportivo Neza	84	(0)
1988–1995	Club América	59	(0)
1995	Irapuato	0	(0)
1995–1999	Puebla	28	(0)
Total		171	(0)

International career
1993	Mexico	5	(0)
Medal record
Representing Mexico
Runner-up	Copa America	1993
- * Club domestic league appearances and goals

Luis Alejandro García Barrera (Note: In this Spanish name, the first or paternal surname is García and the second or maternal family name is Barrera.) (born 26 February 1961) is a Mexican former footballer who played at both professional and international levels as a goalkeeper.

== Club career ==
Born in Monterrey, García played professionally for Deportivo Neza, Club América, Irapuato and Puebla. He began his career with Deportivo Neza in the 1986–87 season, moving to América the next year.

== International career ==
García also represented Mexico at international level, earning a total of 5 caps. All of them were during 1993, beginning with a 2–0 victory over Romania on February 10, 1993. He also made three appearances during the 1993 CONCACAF Gold Cup, in each case coming on as a second-half substitute for a field player to enable starting keeper Jorge Campos to play as a forward in decisive Mexican victories.
