= Jaime Sandoval =

Chilean footballer (born 1971)

Personal information
- Full name: Jaime Antonio Sandoval Rosales
- Date of birth: 12 September 1971 (age 55)
- Place of birth: Santiago, Chile
- Height: 1.82 m (6 ft 0 in)
- Position: Defender

Senior career*
Years	Team	Apps	(Gls)
- Municipal Las Condes
1992	San Antonio Unido		
1993	Provincial Osorno	13	(2)
1995–1996	Cobresal	41	(2)
1997	Deportes Concepción	21	(0)
1998–2001	Rangers	95	(3)
2002–2003	Coquimbo Unido	47	(1)
2004	PSIM Yogyakarta		(4)
- * Club domestic league appearances and goals

Jaime Antonio Sandoval Rosales (born 12 September 1971) is a Chilean former professional footballer who played as a defender for clubs in Chile and Indonesia.

== Career ==
In his early years as a professional footballer, Sandoval played for Municipal Las Condes and San Antonio Unido in the Chilean Tercera División.

In the Chilean Primera División, he played for Provincial Osorno (1993), Deportes Concepción (1997), Rangers (1998–99, 2001) and Coquimbo Unido (2002–03).

In the second level of the Chilean football, he played for Cobresal (1995–96) and Rangers (2000), with whom he got promotion to the top division.

In his last year, he moved to Indonesia and played for PSIM Yogyakarta (2004), where he scored four goals and coincided with his compatriot César Bravo.

== Post-retirement ==
Sandoval has worked for the Ministry of Public Works in Talca and has represented its football team, Vialidad, in both friendlies and the local championship for workers, alongside former professional players such as César Muena and Ramón Castro.
