= Lira (footballer) =

Brazilian footballer (born 1966)

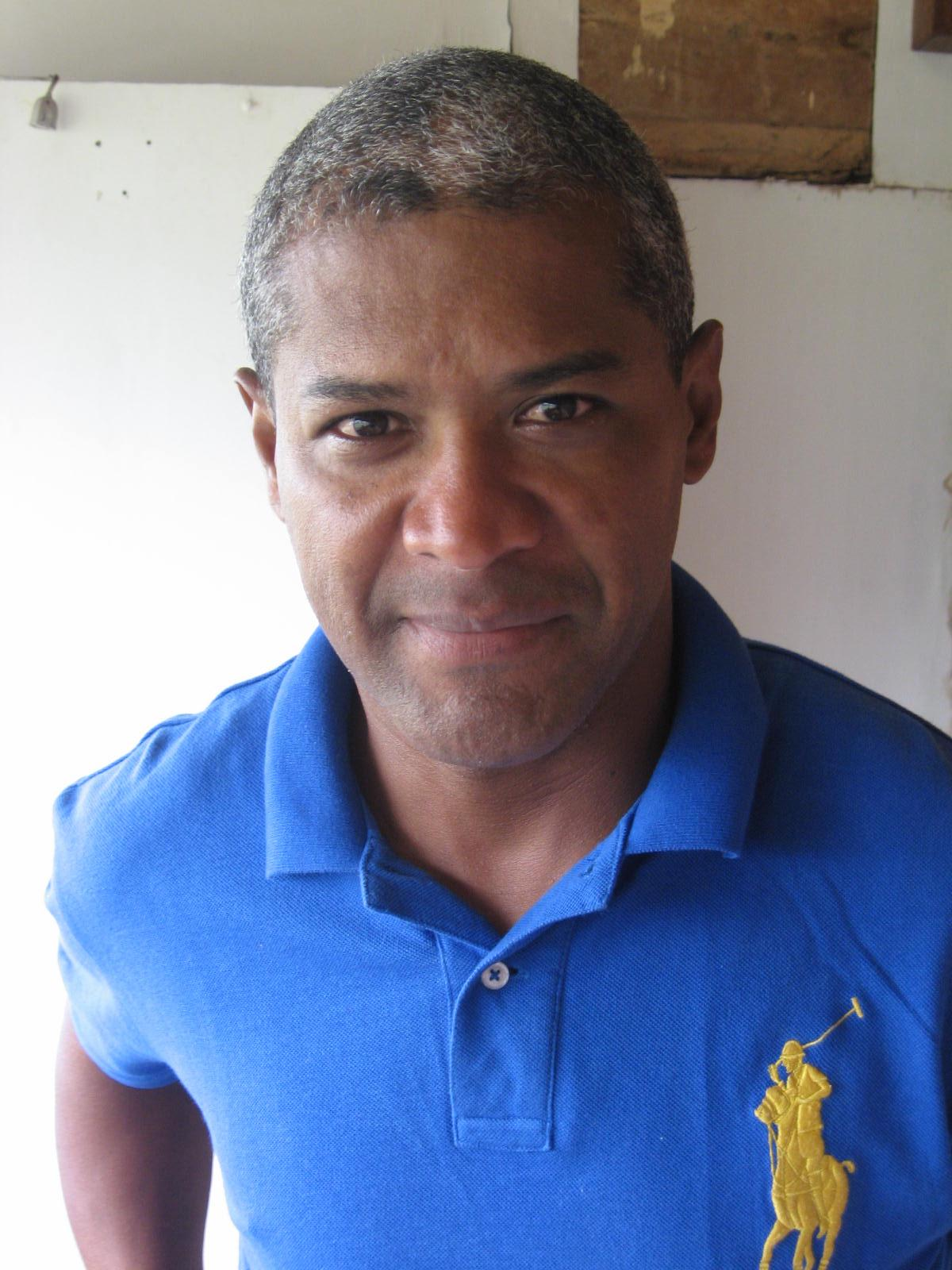

Personal information
- Full name: Carlos Augusto José Lira
- Date of birth: 2 April 1966 (age 60)
- Place of birth: Brasília, Brazil

International career
Years	Team	Apps	(Gls)
1990–1993	Brazil	8	(0)

Carlos Augusto José Lira (born 2 April 1966), known as just Lira, is a Brazilian footballer. He played in eight matches for the Brazil national football team from 1990 to 1993. He was also part of Brazil's squad for the 1991 Copa América tournament.
