= Óscar Ortubé =

Bolivian football referee (1944–2024)

Juan Óscar Ortubé Vargas (26 May 1944 – 1 January 2024) was a Bolivian football referee from 1970 to 1991.

== Career ==
Ortubé began his career in the Bolivian national championship in the 1960s. In 1970 he was appointed international, at the age of twenty-six; he then directed during various editions of the Copa Libertadores. Ortubé was often designated to referee the decisive matches in the Bolivian top flight championship once it became professional in 1977: he refereed the finals of the tournament several times. In 1985 he was chosen for the first time for a national team competition: he attended the U-16 World Cup match between Qatar Under-16 and Hungary Under-16. In 1987 he was once again included in the list for the U-16 World Cup, where he refereed Canada Under-16 against Qatar Under-17. He made his debut in a senior competition during the 1989 Copa América, in the match between Paraguay and Colombia. He was also part of the referee team for the 1991 Copa América, making two appearances. 1991 was also his last year as an international referee. With Jorge Antequera and Luis Barrancos he was among the best Bolivian referees of the time. He is uncle of René Ortubé, also a football referee. With 292 appearances he is the third referee in terms of number of direct matches in the Bolivian top flight.

== Personal life and death ==
Ortubé was born in La Paz. He was uncle of René Ortubé. Óscar Ortubé died in Buenos Aires on 1 January 2024, at the age of 79.
