= Modesto Soruco =

Bolivian footballer (born 1966)

Personal information
- Full name: Modesto Soruco Saucedo
- Date of birth: February 12, 1966 (age 60)
- Place of birth: San Ignacio de Velasco, Bolivia
- Height: 1.78 m (5 ft 10 in)
- Position: Defender

International career
| Years | Team | Apps | (Gls) |
| 1991–1994 | Bolivia | 23 | (0) |

Modesto Soruco Saucedo (born February 12, 1966) is a retired Bolivian football defender who played for the Bolivia national team in Copa América 1991 and Copa América 1993. He was also a member of the squad that qualified and participated in the 1994 FIFA World Cup. At club level he spent most of his career with Blooming, where he played from 1986 to 1997. Towards the end of his career, Soruco also had spells with San José, Independiente Petrolero and Aurora. He made his final run in the Copa Simón Bolívar with Real Santa Cruz in 2003.
