= Henry Lopes =

Henry Lopes may refer to:

- Henry Lopes, 1st Baron Roborough (1859–1938)
- Henry Lopes, 1st Baron Ludlow (1828–1899)
- Henry Lopes, 2nd Baron Ludlow (1865–1922)

== See also ==
- Henri Lopes (1937–2023), Congolese writer, diplomat, and political figure
- Henry López (disambiguation)
