= Alexander Bottini =

Venezuelan footballer (1969-2002)

Personal information
- Date of birth: 7 May 1969
- Date of death: 8 May 2002 (aged 33)

International career
Years	Team	Apps	(Gls)
1991–1993	Venezuela	2	(0)

Alexander Bottini (7 May 1969 – 8 May 2002) was a Venezuelan footballer. He played in two matches for the Venezuela national football team from 1991 to 1993. He was also part of Venezuela's squad for the 1991 Copa América tournament.
