= Ceferino Bencomo =

Venezuelan footballer (born 1970)

Personal information
- Date of birth: 1 November 1970 (age 55)
- Place of birth: Caracas, Venezuela

International career
Years	Team	Apps	(Gls)
1989	Venezuela	1	(0)

Ceferino Bencomo (born 1 November 1970) is a Venezuelan footballer. He played in one match for the Venezuela national football team in 1989. He was also part of Venezuela's squad for the 1991 Copa América tournament.
