= Modesto Molina =

Bolivian footballer (born 1968)

Personal information
- Date of birth: 21 September 1968 (age 58)
- Place of birth: Pailón, Bolivia

International career
Years	Team	Apps	(Gls)
1991–1993	Bolivia	7	(0)

Modesto Molina (born 21 September 1968) is a Bolivian footballer. He played in seven matches for the Bolivia national football team from 1991 to 1993. He was also part of Bolivia's squad for the 1991 Copa América tournament.
