= Bezerra River =

Bezerra River may refer to two rivers in Brazil:

- Bezerra River (Goiás)
- Bezerra River (Tocantins)

== See also ==
- Bezerra (disambiguation)
