= Ricardo Bravo =

Peruvian footballer (born 1970)

Personal information
- Date of birth: 25 June 1970 (age 56)
- Place of birth: Lima, Peru

International career
Years	Team	Apps	(Gls)
1991	Peru	7	(0)

Ricardo Bravo (born 25 June 1970) is a former Peruvian footballer who played asa forward.

== Club career ==
He played for Universitario in the Peruvian league from 1990 until 1993.

== International ==
He played in seven matches for the Peru national football team in 1991. He was also part of Peru's squad for the 1991 Copa América tournament.
