= Abraham Nava =

Mexican footballer (born 1964)

Personal information
- Full name: Abraham Nava Valay
- Date of birth: 23 January 1964 (age 62)
- Place of birth: Mexico City, Mexico
- Height: 1.75 m (5 ft 9 in)
- Position: Defender

Senior career*
Years	Team	Apps	(Gls)
1984–1991	Pumas		
1991–1994	Nexaca		
1994–1996	Monterrey		
1996–1997	Pumas		
1998	Toros Neza		

International career
1991–1993	Mexico	9	(0)
Medal record
Representing Mexico
Runner-up	Copa America	1993
- * Club domestic league appearances and goals as of 16 November 2008

Abraham Nava Valay (born 23 January 1964) is a Mexican former footballer who played as a defender. He obtained a total number of nine caps and no goals for the Mexico national team between 1991 and 1993, and was a squad member at the 1993 Copa América.
