= Mario Rodríguez (footballer, born 1972) =

Peruvian footballer

Personal information
- Full name: Mario Antonio Rodríguez Cortez
- Date of birth: 18 March 1972 (age 54)
- Place of birth: Lima, Peru
- Height: 1.82 m (6 ft 0 in)
- Position: Midfielder

Senior career*
Years	Team	Apps	(Gls)
- Alianza Lima
- Sporting Cristal

International career
1993–1996	Peru	11	(0)
- * Club domestic league appearances and goals

Mario Antonio Rodríguez Cortez (born 18 March 1972) is a Peruvian former footballer who played as a midfielder. He made eleven appearances for the Peru national team from 1993 to 1996. He was also part of Peru's squad for the 1993 Copa América tournament.
