= Otilio Yantis =

Venezuelan footballer (born 1967)

Personal information
- Date of birth: 23 June 1967 (age 59)

International career
| Years | Team | Apps | (Gls) |
| 1989–1991 | Venezuela | 5 | (0) |

Otilio Yantis (born 23 June 1967) is a Venezuelan footballer. He played in five matches for the Venezuela national football team from 1989 to 1991. He was also part of Venezuela's squad for the 1991 Copa América tournament.
