= Carlos Turrubiates =

Mexican footballer

Personal information
- Full name: Carlos Turrubiates Perez
- Date of birth: 24 January 1966 (age 60)
- Place of birth: Reynosa, Mexico
- Height: 1.90 m (6 ft 3 in)
- Position: Defender

Team information
- Current team: Tigres UANL (reserves) (Manager)

Senior career*
Years	Team	Apps	(Gls)
1990–1993	León	68	(4)
1993–1996	Guadalajara	69	(5)
1996–1998	León	65	(6)
1998–1999	Atlante	17	(2)
2000	León	8	(0)

International career
1990–1997	Mexico	5	(0)

Managerial career
- 2001–2002: Atlante (Assistant)
- 2003: Trotamundos Tijuana
- 2007–2009: Tigres UANL (reserves)
- 2010: Veracruz
- 2012: San Luis (Assistant)
- 2013: Puebla (Assistant)
- 2014–2015: América Reserves and Academy
- 2017: Necaxa (Assistant)
- 2024–: Tigres UANL (reserves)
Medal record
Representing Mexico
Runner-up	Copa America	1993
- * Club domestic league appearances and goals

Carlos Turrubiates Pérez (born 24 January 1968) is a Mexican former professional footballer who played for León, Guadalajara and Atlante.

A central defender, Turrubiates began his career with León during the 1990–91 season. In the following year, he scored the goal in extra time that won the championship for León against Puebla. He scored three times in the 1992–93 season and then moved to Guadalajara, where he played three years before returning to León. Turrubiates again reached the final with León during the Invierno 1997 campaign, only to lose in extra time on this occasion to Cruz Azul on a penalty from Carlos Hermosillo. Moving to Atlante in 1998, Turrubiates came back for a third stint at León in 1999 and played his final top-division season in 2000.

Turrubiates also earned 7 caps for the Mexico national team. His first international appearance came on 29 June 1993 in an exhibition match against Costa Rica, a 2–0 win in which Mexico fielded a large number of untried players because the starters were at the 1993 Copa América. Turrubiates himself was on the Copa América roster, but did not play. He subsequently appeared for Mexico's victorious team in the 1993 CONCACAF Gold Cup, coming off the bench in the semifinal against Jamaica, but was unable to make the World Cup squad coached by Miguel Mejía Baron. Three years later, Turrubiates returned to the national team under Bora Milutinovic, starting in Mexico's 1–0 loss to Jamaica in a World Cup qualifier on 17 November 1996. His final cap was on 5 February 1997, when he played the first hour in a 3–1 victory over Ecuador before being replaced by the 17-year-old Rafael Márquez, who was making his international debut.

== Management career ==
After announcing the departure of Sergio Bueno as manager of Tiburones Rojos de Veracruz, the board of directors made it official that Turrubiates will be the interim coach, a former Primera División player and manager for various teams of the two major tiers of Mexican football.
