= César Bravo =

Chilean footballer and manager (born 1973)

Personal information
- Full name: César Alexis Bravo Castillo
- Date of birth: 25 April 1973 (age 53)
- Place of birth: Santiago, Chile
- Height: 1.78 m (5 ft 10 in)
- Position: Defender

Youth career
- Cobreloa

Senior career*
| Years | Team | Apps | (Gls) |
| 1992–2001 | Cobreloa | 135 | (2) |
| 2001–2003 | Everton Viña del Mar | | (4) |
| 2003 | Provincial Osorno | | (1) |
| 2004 | PSIM Yogyakarta | | |
| 2004–2005 | Persikota Tangerang | | (2) |
| 2006–2007 | Persema Malang | | |
| 2008–2009 | Ñublense | 4 | (0) |
| 2010 | PSLS Lhokseumawe | | |

Managerial career
- 2009–2016: Cobreloa (youth)
- 2014: Cobreloa (caretaker)
- 2016: Cobreloa (caretaker)
- 2016: Cobreloa
- 2017–2018: Cobreloa (youth)
- 2019–2021: Unión Española (youth)
- 2021: Unión Española (caretaker)
- 2021–2022: Unión Española
- 2023–2024: Trasandino
- 2024–2026: Cobreloa
- * Club domestic league appearances and goals

César Alexis Bravo Castillo (born 25 April 1973) is a Chilean football manager and former player who played as a defender.

== Club career ==
As a player, Bravo represented Cobreloa, Everton de Viña del Mar, Provincial Osorno and Ñublense in his home country.

In Indonesia, he played for PSIM Yogyakarta, where he coincided with his compatriot Jaime Sandoval, Persikota Tangerang, Persema Malang and PSLS Lhokseumawe.

== Managerial career ==
After retiring, Bravo worked as a youth manager for Cobreloa, also acting as a caretaker on several occasions before becoming a manager in 2016. In the following year, however, he returned to the youth sides.

In 2019, Bravo moved to Unión Española also as a youth manager, and was a caretaker in the first team in January 2021 after Ronald Fuentes was sacked. In May 2021, after the departure of Jorge Pellicer, he was named permanent manager of the main squad.

Bravo was sacked from La Furia on 9 September 2022. On 5 December, he was confirmed as manager of Trasandino in the Segunda División Profesional de Chile for the upcoming season.

Bravo was dismissed from Trasandino in March 2024. In October, he returned to Cobreloa as manager of them until the end of the year. He left them on 11 September 2026.
