= Pedro Gallardo =

Venezuelan footballer (born 1969)

Personal information
- Date of birth: 2 May 1969 (age 57)

International career
| Years | Team | Apps | (Gls) |
| 1989–1991 | Venezuela | 7 | (0) |

Pedro Gallardo (born 2 May 1969) is a Venezuelan footballer. He played in seven matches for the Venezuela national football team from 1989 to 1991. He was also part of Venezuela's squad for the 1991 Copa América tournament.
