= Eduardo Zambrano (footballer) =

Ecuadorian footballer (born 1970)

Personal information
- Full name: Eduardo Enrique Zambrano Martínez
- Date of birth: 23 March 1970 (age 56)
- Place of birth: Quito, Ecuador
- Height: 1.75 m (5 ft 9 in)
- Position: Defender

Senior career*
Years	Team	Apps	(Gls)
- L.D.U. Quito
- Barcelona S.C

International career
1993	Ecuador	2	(0)
- * Club domestic league appearances and goals

Eduardo Enrique Zambrano Martínez (born 23 march 1970) is an Ecuadorian former footballer who played as a midfielder for L.D.U. Quito. He made two appearances for the Ecuador national team in 1993. He was also part of Ecuador's squad for the 1993 Copa América tournament.
