= Stony Batioja =

Ecuadorian footballer (born 1964)

Personal information
- Date of birth: 30 April 1964 (age 62)

International career
Years	Team	Apps	(Gls)
1987–1991	Ecuador	3	(0)

Stony Batioja (born 30 April 1964) is an Ecuadorian footballer. He played in three matches for the Ecuador national football team from 1987 to 1991. He was also part of Ecuador's squad for the 1991 Copa América tournament.
