= Eduardo Pimentel (footballer) =

Colombian footballer (born 1961)

Personal information
- Date of birth: 18 May 1961 (age 65)

International career
Years	Team	Apps	(Gls)
1991	Colombia	7	(0)

Eduardo Pimentel (born 18 May 1961) is a Colombian footballer. He played in seven matches for the Colombia national football team in 1991. He was also part of Colombia's squad for the 1991 Copa América tournament.
