= Robert Rodallega =

Venezuelan footballer (born 1969)

Personal information
- Date of birth: 18 November 1969 (age 56)

International career
Years	Team	Apps	(Gls)
1991–1997	Venezuela	6	(0)

Robert Rodallega (born 18 November 1969) is a Venezuelan footballer. He played in six matches for the Venezuela national football team from 1991 to 1997. He was also part of Venezuela's squad for the 1991 Copa América tournament.
