= Carlos Becerra =

Carlos Becerra may refer to:

- Carlos Becerra (politician) (fl. 2000s), Argentine politician
- Carlos Becerra (cyclist) (born 1982), Colombian cyclist
- Carlos Becerra (actor) (born 1991), American actor, producer and entrepreneur
- Carlos Pano Becerra (born 1959), Mexican politician
- Carlos Santana Becerra (1908–1971), Puerto Rico Supreme Court judge
