= Marcelo Torrico =

Bolivian footballer (born 1972)

Personal information
- Full name: Marcelo Ernesto Torrico Terán
- Date of birth: 11 January 1972 (age 54)
- Place of birth: Cochabamba, Bolivia
- Height: 1.78 m (5 ft 10 in)
- Position: Goalkeeper

Senior career*
| Years | Team | Apps | (Gls) |
| 1992–1997 | The Strongest | | |
| 1998–1999 | Jorge Wilstermann | | |

International career
| 1993–1995 | Bolivia | 1 | (0) |
- * Club domestic league appearances and goals

Marcelo Ernesto Torrico Terán (born January 11, 1972) is a retired Bolivian football goalkeeper. He was part of the Bolivia national football team in the 1994 FIFA World Cup. He played for The Strongest.
