= S. Patricia Becerra =

Biochemist

Sofia Patricia Becerra
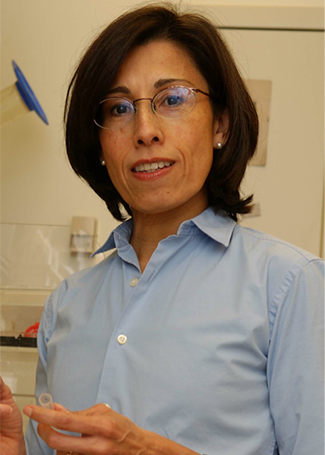
- Becerra in 2019
- Born: Lima, Peru
- Education: Pontifical Catholic University of Peru; Cayetano Heredia University (BS); University of Navarra (PhD)
- Scientific career
- Fields: Biochemistry
- Workplaces: National Eye Institute

Sofia Patricia Becerra is a biochemist specializing in the retina. She researches protein structure and function in relation to drug development for combating blindness. Becerra is a senior investigator at the National Eye Institute.

== Early life and education ==
Becerra was born in Lima. She attended Pontifical Catholic University of Peru before completing a bachelor of science at Cayetano Heredia University. Becerra received her Ph.D. in biochemistry from the University of Navarra in 1979 studying lipid-protein interactions of liver mitochondria enzymes. She received postdoctoral research training with Samuel H. Wilson at the National Cancer Institute studying enzymology of DNA polymerases and exonucleases, followed by training at the National Institute of Allergy and Infectious Diseases (NIAID) in molecular virology of adeno-associated virus. She returned to Wilson's lab as an expert to study structure-function relationships of HIV reverse transcriptase.

== Career ==
Becerra joined the National Eye Institute (NEI) as a visiting scientist in 1991, became an investigator in 1994, and was promoted to principal investigator in 2001 to study the biochemistry of PEDF. The interests of her section are in protein structure as it relates to function, with a focus on the interactions of components involved in cell differentiation, survival, and maintenance. Her research at NEI has applied these interests to systems in the retina. Becerra also investigates protein structure and function in relation to drug development for combating blindness.

== Selected works ==
- Becerra, S. P.; Rose, J. A.; Hardy, M.; Baroudy, B. M.; Anderson, C. W. (December 1985). "Direct mapping of adeno-associated virus capsid proteins B and C: a possible ACG initiation codon". Proceedings of the National Academy of Sciences. 82 (23): 7919–7923. Bibcode:1985PNAS...82.7919B. doi:10.1073/pnas.82.23.7919. ISSN 0027-8424. PMC 390881. PMID 2999784.
- Becerra, S. Patricia; Sagasti, Alessandra; Spinella, Patricia; Notario, Vicente (October 1995). "Pigment Epithelium-derived Factor Behaves Like a Noninhibitory Serpin". Journal of Biological Chemistry. 270 (43): 25992–25999. doi:10.1074/jbc.270.43.25992. PMID 7592790.
- Becerra, S. Patricia (1997), "Structure-Function Studies on PEDF", in Church, Frank C.; Cunningham, Dennis D.; Ginsburg, David; Hoffman, Maureane (eds.), Chemistry and Biology of Serpins, Advances in Experimental Medicine and Biology, vol. 425, Boston, MA: Springer US, pp. 223–237, doi:10.1007/978-1-4615-5391-5_21, ISBN 978-1-4613-7461-9
- Becerra, S. Patricia; Notario, Vicente (April 2013). "The effects of PEDF on cancer biology: mechanisms of action and therapeutic potential". Nature Reviews Cancer. 13 (4): 258–271. doi:10.1038/nrc3484. ISSN 1474-1768. PMC 3707632. PMID 23486238.
