= Blas Romero =

Paraguayan footballer (born 1966)

Personal information
- Full name: Blas Agustin Romero
- Date of birth: 2 February 1966 (age 60)
- Place of birth: San Lorenzo, Paraguay
- Height: 1.76 m (5 ft 9 in)
- Positions: Midfielder; forward

Senior career*
Years	Team	Apps	(Gls)
1984–1986	Sportivo San Lorenzo		
1986–1991	Libertad		
1991–1992	Belgrano	28	(2)
1993	Once Philips-Colombiana		
1994–1995	Deportes Concepción	30	(5)
1996	Sol de América		
1997	Oriente Petrolero		
1997	Atlético Colegiales		
1998	Sportivo San Lorenzo		

International career
1991	Paraguay	2	(0)

Managerial career
- 2010–2011: Sportivo San Lorenzo
- 2015: Selección Sanlorenzana
- 2016–?: Sportivo San Lorenzo
- * Club domestic league appearances and goals

Blas Agustin Romero (born 2 February 1966) is a retired football (soccer) forward from Paraguay.

== Career ==
Romero played professional football in Paraguay, Argentina, Colombia, Chile and Bolivia during his career. Romero played for Argentina first division side Club Atlético Belgrano. Following Belgrano, he played for Once Philips-Colombiana and Deportes Concepción.

Romero made his international debut for the Paraguay national football team on 14 June 1991 in a Copa Paz de Chaco match against Bolivia (0-1 win). He obtained a total number of two international caps, scoring no goals for the national side.
