= Arnulfo Becerra =

Venezuelan footballer (born 1962)

Personal information
- Date of birth: 4 April 1962 (age 64)

International career
Years	Team	Apps	(Gls)
1985	Venezuela	2	(0)

Arnulfo Becerra (born 4 April 1962) is a Venezuelan footballer. He played in two matches for the Venezuela national football team in 1985. He was also part of Venezuela's squad for the 1991 Copa América tournament.
