= Ernesto Aguirre (footballer) =

Peruvian footballer (born 1963)

Personal information
- Date of birth: 10 September 1963 (age 63)

Senior career*
Years	Team	Apps	(Gls)
1984-1986	Alianza Lima		
1987	Independiente Santa Fé		
1988-1992	Unión Huaral		
1993-1994	Deportivo Municipal		

International career
1991	Peru	4	(0)

Managerial career
- 2009-2010: Hijos de Acosvinchos
- 2010: Deportivo Municipal
- 2011: Defensor Zarumilla
- 2013: Deportivo Coopsol
- * Club domestic league appearances and goals

Ernesto Aguirre (born 10 September 1963) is a Peruvian footballer. He played in four matches for the Peru national football team in 1991. He was also part of Peru's squad for the 1991 Copa América tournament.
