= Manuel Becerra (settler) =

Manuel Becerra (1762 – c. 1849) was a Tejano settler and politician in Texas. In the 1820s, he served as the first secretary of the town of La Bahia (today Goliad, Texas) and accompanied Stephen F. Austin's travel to the Colorado River to find a place for a colony. In 1827, he served as síndico (civil judge or syndic) in Martín De León's Guadalupe colony and helped negotiate a treaty with the Karankawa tribe. In 1832, Becerra received a land grant of 8,856 acres (35.84 km^{2}) from the Mexican Government in what is now Refugio County.

== Historical Marker ==
There is a historical marker for Manuel Becerra at Presidio La Bahia 1.5 mi (2.4 km) south of Goliad, Texas. The marker was commissioned and placed by his descendant Estella Zermeño.
