= William Bezerra =

Brazilian boxer (born 1984)

Personal information
- Nickname: Thompson
- Born: William Fernando Souza Bezerra; 20 September 1984 (age 41) São Paulo, Brazil
- Height: 5 ft 11 1/2 in (1.82 m)
- Weight: Cruiserweight

Boxing career
- Reach: 77 in (196 cm)
- Stance: Orthodox

Boxing record
- Total fights: 42
- Wins: 42
- Win by KO: 41
- Losses: 0
- Draws: 0

William Fernando Souza Bezerra (born 20 September 1984) is a Brazilian former professional boxer who held the WBA Fedelatin cruiserweight title from 2012 to 2013. In addition, he held WBA Fedebol, WBC Mundo Hispano and South American titles in the same weight class. At one point he was ranked the fourth-best cruiserweight in the world by the WBA.

He amassed an amateur record of 96–2 (68 KO), and subsequently won the interim Brazilian cruiserweight title in his professional debut in 2010. His only non-knockout victory of his career came later that year when he defeated Hierro Salcedo by disqualification in his fifteenth bout.

== Professional boxing record ==
42 fights, 42 wins (41 knockouts, 1 disqualification), 0 loss (0 knockout)
| Res. | Record | Opponent | Type | Rd., Time | Date | Location | Notes |
| Win | 42-0 | (Brazil) Francisco Marcelo Duarte Sobrinho | TKO | 1 (10), 0:59 | 2015-03-19 | (Brazil) Ginásio Astros do Ringue, São Paulo | |
| Win | 41-0 | (Brazil) Romildo Dos Santos | KO | 1 (10), 1:19 | 2015-07-17 | (Brazil) Ginásio Astros do Ringue, São Paulo | South American cruiserweight title |
| Win | 40-0 | (Mexico) Austreberto Perez Maranon | TKO | 6 (10), 2:44 | 2015-02-01 | Gimnasio Oscar 'Tigre' García, Ensenada, Baja California, Mexico | |
