= Víctor Aragón =

Bolivian footballer (born 1966)

Personal information
- Date of birth: 23 December 1966 (age 59)

International career
Years	Team	Apps	(Gls)
1991	Bolivia	2	(0)

Víctor Aragón (born 23 December 1966) is a Bolivian footballer. He played in two matches for the Bolivia national football team in 1991. He was also part of Bolivia's squad for the 1991 Copa América tournament.
