= Angelica Becerra =

Visual artist activist

Angélica Becerra (born 1990) is an activist visual artist who primarily works in watercolor and digital media.

== Biography ==
Angélica Becerra was born in San Juan de Los Lagos, Jalisco, Mexico. As a child, she and her family migrated to California. Becerra's aunt who attended architecture school introduced her to drawing. Many of Becerra's family share an artists background. Becerra teaches at the La Casa de la Cultural. During her undergraduate career, she served as a student leader and helped establish her department’s first series of film screenings to showcase Latina/o issues .Becerra earned a PhD degree from the Cesar E. Chavez Department of Chicana/o and Central American Studies at University of California, Los Angeles.

== Art ==
Andrea Becerra is an artist who focuses on print cultures. Becerra's art themes focus on social justice. Becerra's activist research includes creating visibility for Latinx community. One of Angélica's artworks focuses on activist and writer Sandra Cisneros. These images include the writer's quotes and highlight women empowerment.

Her creative process begins with political research. Her most recent body of work titled "Flowers Latinx Activist." These are a series of portraits featuring activists illustrated with their favorite flowers or plants. "Portraits".

== Exhibitions ==
- 2018. “Podcasting as Queer Latinx Community Building”, California, State University, Long Beach, California, October 22, 2018.
- 2018. “Creating Queer Family through Tech”, Google Campus, Venice, California . November 4.
- 2018. “What is Arts Activism?”, Social and Public Art Resource Center, Venice, California.
- August 2. 2017. “Ni Solo Mujeres: Intersecting Chicana Identities.”, Art Gallery, Southwestern College, San Diego, California.
- Angélica Becerra. “Miramé: Self-Portraiture in Contemporary Chicanx Art” Latino Art Now! National Conference, Houston, Texas, April 4-6th, 2019.
- Angélica Becerra. “The Art is the Movement: The Chicanx Political Poster and its Digital Turn.” National Association of Chicana and Chicano Studies Conference Irvine, California, March 25, 2017.
- Angélica Becerra. “From Viet-Nam to Palestine: International Art and the Chicana Radical Aesthetic.” National Association of Chicana and Chicano Studies Conference, Denver, Colorado, April 9, 2015.
- Angélica Becerra. “Making Visual Campaigns in Solidarity with Palestinian Students on U.S. Campuses” Critical Ethnic Studies Association, York University, Toronto Canada, May 3, 2015.
- Angélica Becerra. “Chicana Feminist Art: A Primer” Association of Joteria, Arts and Activism, Phoenix, Arizona, October 18, 2015.
- Angélica Becerra. “Chicana Desire in the City: Lesbian Representations in Mosquita y Mari” Mujeres Activas en Letras y Cambio Social / Women Active in Letters and Social Change Summer Institute, Ohio State University, Columbus, Ohio. July 17, 2013.
- Angélica Becerra. “Chicana Lesbian Film: Representation and Desire”, National Association of Chicana and Chicano Studies Conference. San Antonio, Texas, March 22, 2013
