= Robert Burbano (footballer, born 1970) =

Ecuadorian footballer

Personal information
- Full name: Robert Javier Burbano Burbano
- Date of birth: 27 September 1970 (age 56)
- Place of birth: Quevedo, Ecuador

International career
Years	Team	Apps	(Gls)
1991–2000	Ecuador	14	(0)

Robert Javier Burbano Burbano (born 27 September 1970) is an Ecuadorian footballer. He played in 14 matches for the Ecuador national football team from 1991 to 2000 . He was also part of Ecuador's squad for the 1991 Copa América tournament.
