= Eugenio La Rosa =

Peruvian footballer (born 1962)

Personal information
- Full name: Eugenio Tomás La Rosa Laguna
- Date of birth: 20 December 1962 (age 63)
- Place of birth: Lima, Peru
- Position: Striker

Senior career*
Years	Team	Apps	(Gls)
1980–1988	Alianza Lima		
1988	Argentinos Juniors		
1989	Deportivo Quito		
1990	CSI San Borja		
1991	Sporting Cristal		
1992–1994	Deportivo Municipal		

International career
1984–1991	Peru	15	(3)
- * Club domestic league appearances and goals

Eugenio Tomás La Rosa Laguna (born 20 December 1962) is a retired Peruvian international footballer who played for Alianza Lima and clubs in Argentina and Ecuador.

== Career ==
Born in Lima, Peru, La Rosa played for local giants Alianza Lima before moving abroad to play in Argentina and Ecuador. La Rosa made 15 appearances, scoring three goals, for the Peru national football team from 1984 to 1991. He participated in the 1991 Copa América.
