= Gustavo González (politician) =

Argentine politician (born 1975)

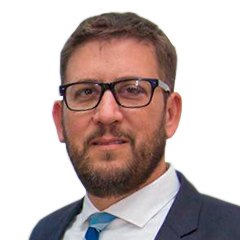

Member of the Chamber of Deputies of Argentina
- Incumbent
- Assumed office 10 December 2019
- Constituency: La Pampa

Personal details
- Born: 19 November 1975 (age 50)
- Party: Frente de Todos
- Occupation: Lawyer

Gustavo González is an Argentine politician who is a member of the Chamber of Deputies of Argentina.
