= Gustavo González Jure =

Chilean police officer

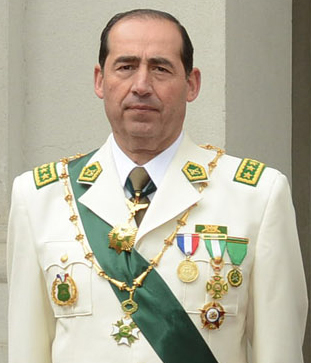

Gustavo González Jure is a Chilean former police officer. He served as general director of Carabineros de Chile from 2011 to 2015.
