= José Rivera (Ecuadorian footballer) =

Ecuadorian footballer (born 1963)

Personal information
- Full name: José Higinio Rivera Mina
- Date of birth: 11 January 1963 (age 63)
- Place of birth: San Lorenzo, Ecuador
- Position: Defender

International career
Years	Team	Apps	(Gls)
1991	Ecuador	3	(0)

José Rivera (born 11 January 1963) is an Ecuadorian footballer. He played in three matches for the Ecuador national football team in 1991. He was also part of Ecuador's squad for the 1991 Copa América tournament.
