= Juan José Becerra =

Argentine writer

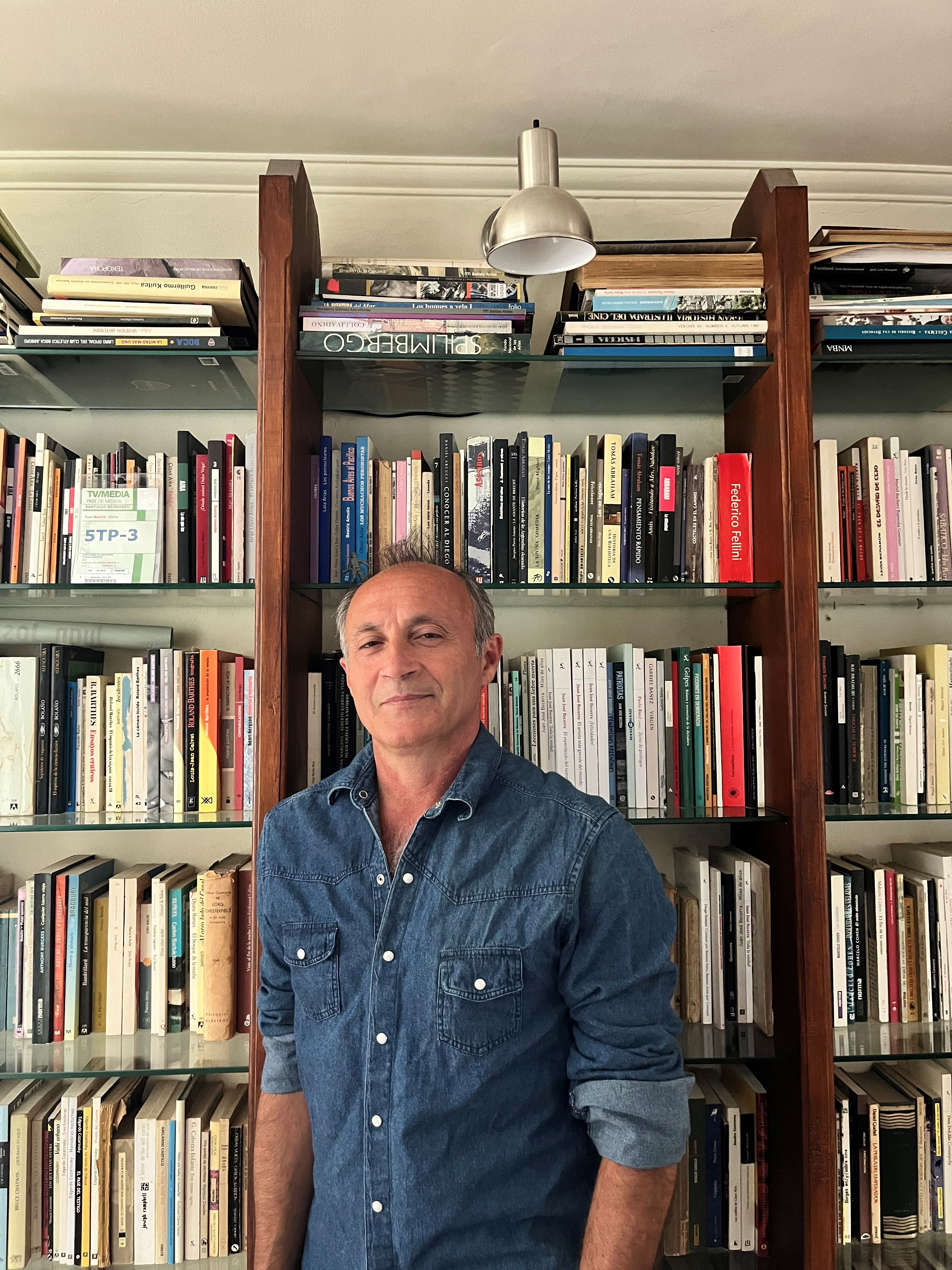
- Juan José Becerra
- Born: 15 June 1965; Manuel B. Gonnet, Argentina
- Occupations: Writer; Screenwriter; Critic
- Writing career
- Language: Spanish
- Notable work: El espectáculo del tiempo
- Notable awards: Konex Award (2024)

Juan José Becerra is an Argentine writer. He has taught screenwriting at the Universidad Nacional de La Plata. He has also worked as a literary editor, ghost writer and documentary scriptwriter. He has taught at the Museo de Arte Latinoamericano de Buenos Aires (MALBA). He contributes regularly to La Agenda magazine to Radio Metro.

== Works ==
=== Novels ===
- La interpretación de un libro. Candaya, 2012
- Toda la verdad. Seix Barral, 2011
- Miles de años. Emecé, 2004
- Atlántida. Norma, 2001
- Santo. Beatriz Viterbo, 1994

=== Short stories ===
- Dos cuentos vulgares. Ediciones El broche, 2012

=== Essays ===
- Fenómenos argentinos. Planeta 2018
- Patriotas. Planeta, 2009
- La vaca – Viaje a la pampa carnívora. Arty Latino, 2007
- Grasa. Planeta, 2007
