= C.A. Bella Vista =

Association football club in Uruguay

Bella Vista
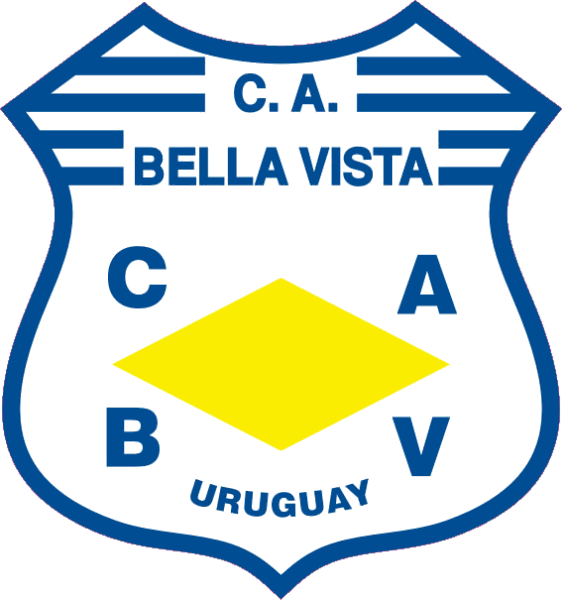
- Full name: Club Atlético Bella Vista
- Nicknames: Papales; Auriblancos
- Founded: October 4, 1920; 105 years ago
- Ground: Estadio José Nasazzi, Montevideo, Uruguay
- Capacity: 10,000
- Chairman: Juan Paulo Nuñez
- League: Primera C
- 2025: Primera C, 3rd of 27
Home colours	Away colours

Club Atlético Bella Vista, usually known simply as Bella Vista is a Uruguayan professional football club based in Montevideo. The club plays its home games at Estadio José Nasazzi, which can hold 10,000 spectators.

== History ==
Club Atlético Bella Vista was founded on 4 October 1920.

In 1930, the club went on an international tour across Chile, Peru, Mexico, USA, Brazil and Cuba, with their biggest victory being a 6–0 win against Atlante.

In 1981, the club competed in the Copa Libertadores. The club played in the same group as Peñarol, of Uruguay, and Estudiantes de Mérida and Portuguesa FC, of Venezuela. The club was eliminated in the first stage of the competition. In 1985, the club competed in the Copa Libertadores again. Bella Vista was in the same group of Peñarol, and two Chilean clubs, Colo-Colo and Magallanes, but were again eliminated at the first stage.

In 1990, Bella Vista won the Uruguayan league, and gained the right to enter the following year's Copa Libertadores. In the following year, in 1991, the club competed in the Copa Libertadores, and was in the same group as Nacional, of Uruguay, and Flamengo and Corinthians, of Brazil. The club finished in the last place of the group. In the 1993 Copa Libertadores, Bella Vista was in the same group as Nacional, of Uruguay, and El Nacional and Barcelona, of Ecuador. After a poor campaign, the club was again eliminated in the first stage.

In 1999, the club, after an absence of six years, returned to Copa Libertadores. Bella Vista was in a group containing Nacional, of Uruguay, Estudiantes de Mérida, of Venezuela, and Monterrey, of Mexico. The club finished in third in the first stage, and qualified to the second stage, where they defeated Universidad Católica, of Chile. However, in the quarterfinals, Bella Vista was eliminated by Deportivo Cali, who were the eventual finalists of the competition. It was the club's best campaign ever in the Copa Libertadores.

In 2000, Bella Vista competed again in the Copa Libertadores, and was grouped alongside Bolivians Bolívar, Atlético Mineiro, of Brazil, and Cobreloa, of Chile. The club was eliminated in the first stage of the competition.

In 2011, the club competed in the Copa Sudamericana in which they were eliminated on the First Round by Universidad Católica

== Honours ==
=== National ===
- Primera División
  - Winners (1): 1990
- Segunda División B Nacional
  - Winners (1): 2018
- Segunda División
  - Winners (5): 1949, 1968, 1976, 1997, 2005
- Divisional Intermedia
  - Winners (2): 1922, 1959

== Performance in CONMEBOL competitions ==
- Copa Libertadores: 6 appearances

1981: First Round
1985: First Round
1991: First Round
1993: First Round
1999: Quarter-Finals
2000: First Round

- Copa Sudamericana: 1 appearances

2011: First Round

== Current squad ==
Note: Flags indicate national team as defined under FIFA eligibility rules; some limited exceptions apply. Players may hold more than one non-FIFA nationality.

No.	Pos.	Nation	Player
—	GK	URU	Sebastián Medina
—	DF	URU	Nicolás Becerra
—	DF	URU	Emanuel Cuello
—	DF	URU	Facundo Capdevielle
—	DF	ARG	Nicolás Fernández
—	FW	URU	Brandon Cardozo
—	DF	URU	Ignacio Beltramelli
—	MF	URU	Pablo Castro
—	MF	URU	Juan Sandín
—	MF	URU	Diego Cordero
—	FW	URU	Christian Vaquero

No.	Pos.	Nation	Player
—	MF	URU	Itan Salvarrey
—	MF	URU	Facundo Briñón

== Jersey origin controversy ==
The Bella Vista jersey represents the Vatican flag, half yellow and half white. This is why the club is nicknamed the "papales", the ones who follow the papal, el papado, the Vatican authority.

Some versions say the origin can be different. Due to the divided fanaticism between Peñarol and Nacional of the club's former authorities, they decided the jersey to have the predominant colors of the two Uruguayan big clubs. Note that this is exactly what Arsenal of Sarandí from Argentina did when designing its jersey, light blue and red, due to the authorities of the club being Independiente and Racing of Avellaneda supporters.

== Managers ==
- (Uruguay) Voltaire García
- (Uruguay) Manuel Keosseian
- (Uruguay) Henry López Báez
- (Uruguay) Hugo Bagnulo (1971)
- (Uruguay) Juan Hohberg
- (Uruguay) Washington Etchamendi (1973–75)
- (Uruguay) Sergio Markarián (1976–79)
- (Uruguay) Óscar Tabárez (1980–83)
- (Uruguay) José María Rodríguez (1984)
- (Uruguay) Jorge González (Jan 1995 – Dec 95)
- (Uruguay) Julio César Ribas (Jan 1997 – Dec 98)
- (Argentina) Sergio Batista (Jan 2000 – Oct 00)
- (Uruguay) (Spain) Martín Lasarte (2000–01)
- (Uruguay) Ildo Maneiro (2006–08)
- (Uruguay) Gustavo Matosas (2008–09)
- (Uruguay) Pablo Alonso (July 2009–??)
- (Uruguay) Diego Alonso (Sept 2011 – June 12)
- (Uruguay) Guillermo Sanguinetti (June 2012 – Nov 12)
- (Uruguay) Mario Carballo (Nov 2012 – Dec 12)
- (Uruguay) Julio César Ribas (Dec 2012–)

== See also ==
- Paysandú Bella Vista
