= Nicolás Navarro (Mexican footballer) =

Mexican footballer (born 1963)

Personal information
- Date of birth: 17 September 1963 (age 63)
- Place of birth: Mexico
- Height: 1.84 m (6 ft 0 in)
- Position: Goalkeeper

Senior career*
Years	Team	Apps	(Gls)
1983–1997	Necaxa	480	(0)
1997–1998	Cruz Azul	10	(0)
1998–1999	Pachuca	23	(0)
2001–2003	Necaxa	53	(0)
Total		566	(0)

International career
1993–1995	Mexico	3	(0)

Managerial career
- 2004: Necaxa (Assistant)
- 2006: Cruz Azul (Assistant)
- 2009–2010: Monterrey (Goalkeeping coach)
- 2010–2013: Mexico (Goalkeeping coach)
- 2014–2015: Monterrey (Goalkeeping coach)
- 2015–2021: Santos Laguna (Goalkeeping coach)
Medal record
Representing Mexico
Runner-up	Copa America	1993
- * Club domestic league appearances and goals

Nicolás Navarro (born 17 September 1963) is a Mexican former footballer who played as a goalkeeper.

== Club career ==
Navarro made over 400 appearances as goalkeeper for Necaxa, remaining with the club during its rise to the top of the Mexico league in the mid-1990s. He made his debut during the 1983–84 season, emerging as starting goalkeeper after the departure of Adrián Chávez in 1985. During the next decade, he served as Necaxa's number-one keeper, including the championship seasons of 1994–95 and 1995–96. Navarro departed for Cruz Azul for the Invierno 1997 campaign and won a third championship, but played sparingly and did not appear in the final as the young Óscar Pérez became the preferred starter. He left for promoted Pachuca in 1998, again spending much of his time on the bench, before returning to Necaxa for the concluding years of his career. He completed his last top-flight season in 2003 with Necaxa at the age of 39.

== International career ==
Navarro also earned three caps with the Mexico national team. He was an unused substitute at the 1993 Copa America, in which Mexico finished second, but did not make his international debut until a 5–1 victory over Hungary on 14 December 1994. He was also a member of the first international squads called up by Bora Milutinovic during his second stint in charge of Mexico, and was a member of the Mexican sides that took part at the 1995 King Fahd Cup and the 1995 Copa América. Navarro's final international appearance came in a 4–1 home loss to Yugoslavia in Monterrey on 15 November 1995.

He played in the 1983 FIFA U-20 World Cup, in which Mexico national team was eliminated in Round One, having drawn with Australia but lost to Scotland and South Korea. Navarro, as goalkeeper, conceded four goals in the competition.
