= Juan Carlos Zubczuk =

Argentine-Peruvian footballer (born 1965)

Personal information
- Full name: Juan Carlos Zubczuk Miszuk
- Date of birth: March 31, 1965 (age 61)
- Place of birth: Oberá, Argentina
- Height: 1.83 m (6 ft 0 in)
- Position: Goalkeeper

Youth career
- Racing Club

Senior career*
Years	Team	Apps	(Gls)
1983–1987	Racing Club		
1988–1994	Universitario de Deportes		
1995	Alianza Atlético		
- * Club domestic league appearances and goals

Juan Carlos Zubczuk Miszuk (born March 31, 1965, in Oberá, Misiones) is an Argentine-Peruvian retired professional football goalkeeper. He is of Ukrainian descent.

== Club career ==
He played for Racing Club de Avellaneda in Argentina, he also played for Universitario de Deportes and Alianza Atlético in Peru.
