= Gustavo González (footballer) =

Peruvian footballer (born 1964)

Personal information
- Date of birth: 15 September 1964 (age 62)
- Place of birth: Iquitos, Peru

International career
Years	Team	Apps	(Gls)
1989	Peru	1	(0)

Gustavo González (born 15 September 1964) is a Peruvian footballer. He played in one match for the Peru national football team in 1989. He was also part of Peru's squad for the 1991 Copa América tournament.
