= Darío Rojas =

Bolivian footballer (born 1960)

Rubén Darío Rojas Dielma (born January 20, 1960, in Buenos Aires) is a retired Bolivian football goalkeeper. He was part of the Bolivia national football team in the 1994 FIFA World Cup. He has played for Oriente Petrolero, Real Santa Cruz and Guabirá.
