= Gustavo González Hernández =

Mexican politician

Plurinominal member of the Chamber of Deputies
- In office 1 September 2009 – 31 August 2012

Local deputy of the Congress of Jalisco
- In office 1 February 2007 – 31 January 2010 (separated by license)

Guadalajara's City General Attorney (Sindico)
- In office 1 January 2004 – 31 December 2006

Personal details
- Born: 10 July 1970 (age 56) Ciudad Juárez, Chihuahua, Mexico
- Party: National Action Party (Mexico)
- Spouse: Cathy Jo Baxter Gonzalez
- Children: one son
- Education: Western Institute of Technology and Higher Education (ITESO)
- Occupation: Lawyer

Gustavo González Hernández (Note: In this name that follows Hispanic American naming customs, the first or paternal surname is González and the second or maternal family name is Hernández.) (born 10 July 1970) is a Mexican politician from the state of Jalisco. A member of the National Action Party (Partido Acción Nacional, or PAN), he served a three-year term in the Chamber of Deputies from 2009 to 2012.

Gustavo González is a lawyer from the Western Institute of Technology and Higher Education (ITESO) in which he also took the master's degree in Politics and Public Administration. In the docent branch from the year 2000 to the year 2009 he was Professor of Government in Big Cities, Local Bylaws and Public Politics II, in the Political Science Career of the University of Guadalajara.

In July 2003 he was elected General Attorney (Síndico Municipal) of the City of Guadalajara, as he was part of the list headed by the candidate for city mayor Emilio González Márquez, reaching office 1 January 2004.

In the year of 2006 he was elected local deputy of the Congress of Jalisco, for the 12 state district, starting his term in February 2007, where he preside the Constitutional Matters legislative committee. He separated of that charge by constitucional license on 28 August 2009.

From 2009 to 2012 he was a plurinominal deputy during the 61st Congress, where he was the secretary of the Constitutional Matters legislative committee, and formed part of the Metropolitan Development and Federalism Strengthen legislative committees. He also was the president of the Bicameral National Security Committee.
