= Henry López Báez =

Uruguayan footballer (born 1967)

Personal information
- Full name: Henry Ariel López Báez
- Date of birth: 3 July 1967 (age 59)
- Place of birth: Montevideo, Uruguay
- Height: 1.79 m (5 ft 10 in)
- Position: Midfielder

Senior career*
Years	Team	Apps	(Gls)
1986–1993	Bella Vista		
1993–1994	Talleres	4	(0)
1995	Basañez		
1996	Fénix		
1997–2004	Bella Vista		

International career
1991	Uruguay	8	(1)
- * Club domestic league appearances and goals

Henry López Báez (born 3 July 1967, in Montevideo) is a former Uruguayan footballer.

== Club career ==
López Báez spent most of his career playing for Bella Vista in the Primera División Uruguaya. He also had a spell with Talleres in the Primera División de Argentina.

== International career ==
López Báez made eight appearances for the senior Uruguay national football team during 1991.

== Career statistics ==
=== International ===
Scores and results list Uruguay's goal tally first, score column indicates score after each López Báez goal.

List of international goals scored by Henry López Báez
No.	Date	Venue	Opponent	Score	Result	Competition
1	26 June 1991	Estadio Centenario, Montevideo, Uruguay	Chile	1–0	2–1	Friendly
