= Rodrigo Gómez (Chilean footballer) =

Chilean footballer (born 1968)

Personal information
- Full name: Rodrigo Vicente Gómez Peña
- Date of birth: 25 January 1968 (age 58)
- Place of birth: Chile
- Height: 1.74 m (5 ft 9 in)
- Position: Midfielder

Youth career
- Universidad Católica

Senior career*
Years	Team	Apps	(Gls)
1986–1988	Universidad Católica		
1989–1991	Palestino		
1992–1997	Universidad Católica		

International career
1991	Chile	6	(0)
- * Club domestic league appearances and goals

Rodrigo Vicente Gómez Peña (born 25 January 1968) is a Chilean former footballer who played as a midfielder. He played in five matches for the Chile national football team in 1991. He was also part of Chile's squad for the 1991 Copa América tournament.

== Post-retirement ==
Gómez has developed a career as a football commentator in radio media like Radio La Clave.
