= Roberto Cavallo =

Venezuelan footballer (born 1967)

Personal information
- Date of birth: 28 April 1967 (age 59)
- Place of birth: Caracas, Venezuela

International career
Years	Team	Apps	(Gls)
1989–1991	Venezuela	12	(0)

Roberto Cavallo (born 28 April 1967) is a Venezuelan footballer. He played in twelve matches for the Venezuela national football team from 1989 to 1991. He was also part of Venezuela's squad for the 1989 Copa América tournament.
