= Ramón Víctor Castro =

Uruguayan footballer and manager (born 1964)

Personal information
- Full name: Ramón Víctor Castro García
- Date of birth: 13 June 1964 (age 62)
- Place of birth: Montevideo, Uruguay
- Height: 1.78 m (5 ft 10 in)
- Position: Midfielder

Senior career*
Years	Team	Apps	(Gls)
1985–1987	Cerro	72	(17)
1988–1991	Montevideo Wanderers	91	(15)
1992	Deportivo Mandiyú	19	(2)
1992	Peñarol	16	(1)
1993	Cerro		
1993	Liverpool de Montevideo		
1993–1994	Deportivo Español	8	(0)
1995–1997	Deportes Antofagasta		
1998–1999	Rangers de Talca		
2000	Cobresal		

International career
1987–1991	Uruguay	9	(1)

Managerial career
- 2002: Curicó Unido
- 2006: Rangers de Talca
- * Club domestic league appearances and goals

Ramón Víctor Castro García (born 13 June 1964 in Montevideo) is a former Uruguayan footballer. Following his playing career, Castro became a football manager in Chile.

== Club career ==
Castro spent most of his career in the Primera División Uruguaya, playing for Cerro, Montevideo Wanderers and Peñarol. He also had spells with Deportivo Mandiyú and Deportivo Español in the Primera División de Argentina.

== International career ==
Castro made nine appearances for the senior Uruguay national football team from 1987 to 1991.

== Post-retirement ==
Castro has worked for the Ministry of Public Works in Talca, Chile, and has represented its football team, Vialidad, in both friendlies and the local championship for workers, alongside former professional players such as César Muena and Jaime Sandoval.
