= Alfonso Yañez =

Peruvian footballer (born 1970)

Alfonso "Puchungo" Yáñez
Personal information
- Full name: Alfonso Orlando Yáñez Ramírez
- Date of birth: 20 March 1970 (age 56)
- Place of birth: Callao, Peru
- Position: Midfielder

Youth career
- Leon Porteño
- Yo Calidad
- Sport Boys
- Deportivo AELU
- Club Universitario de Deportes

Senior career*
Years	Team	Apps	(Gls)
1987-1992	Club Universitario de Deportes		
1993	Sport Boys		
1993-1994	Querétaro F.C.		
1995	Deportivo Municipal		
1996-1997	Al-Ittihad Club		
1998-1999	Alianza Lima		
2001	Juan Aurich		
2002	SV Dakota		

International career
1989-1991	Peru	13	(1)
- * Club domestic league appearances and goals

Alfonso Yáñez (born 20 March 1970 in Peru) is a Peruvian retired footballer.

== Career ==
Yáñez started his career with Club Universitario de Deportes. In 1996, he signed for Al-Ittihad Club.
