= Peter Méndez =

Uruguayan footballer (born 1964)

Personal information
- Full name: Peter Ramiro Méndez
- Date of birth: 27 January 1964 (age 62)
- Place of birth: Melo, Uruguay
- Height: 1.70 m (5 ft 7 in)
- Position: Forward

Senior career*
Years	Team	Apps	(Gls)
1986–1987	Liverpool de Montevideo		
1988–1991	Defensor Sporting		
1992–1993	Millonarios		
1993–1994	Mallorca		
1995	Universitario		

International career
1991–1992	Uruguay	9	(4)
- * Club domestic league appearances and goals

Peter Ramiro Méndez (born January 27, 1964, in Melo) is a former Uruguayan footballer.

== International career ==
Méndez made nine appearances for the senior Uruguay national football team from 1991 to 1992. He made his debut in a friendly match against Peru (1-0 loss) on June 12, 1991, in Lima, Peru.

== Career statistics ==
=== International ===
Appearances and goals by national team and year
National team	Year	Apps	Goals
Uruguay	1991	8	4
Uruguay	1992	1	0
Total		9	4
