= 1991 Copa América =

- Official program

Tournament details
- Host country: Chile
- Dates: 6–21 July
- Teams: 10 (from 1 confederation)
- Venues: 4 (in 4 host cities)

Final positions
- Champions: Argentina (13th title)
- Runners-up: Brazil
- Third place: Chile
- Fourth place: Colombia

Tournament statistics
- Matches played: 26
- Goals scored: 73 (2.81 per match)
- Attendance: 815,483 (31,365 per match)
- Top scorer(s): (Argentina) Gabriel Batistuta (6 goals)
- Best player: (Argentina) Leonardo Rodríguez

The 1991 Copa América football tournament was hosted by Chile, from 6 to 21 July. It was organized by CONMEBOL and all ten member nations participated.

Until the 2021 edition, this was the last time that the tournament consisted of only CONMEBOL member nations. In later tournaments, at least two nations from outside CONMEBOL have been invited to bring the total number of participants to twelve.

Argentina won the Copa América for the record-tying 13th time, their first since 1959. With this title, Argentina qualified to participate in the 1992 King Fahd Cup and in the 1993 Artemio Franchi Trophy.

== Venues ==
Santiago	1991 Copa América is located in Chile
Estadio Nacional	1991 Copa América is located in Chile
Capacity: 70,000	1991 Copa América is located in Chile
Concepción	1991 Copa América is located in Chile
Estadio Municipal	1991 Copa América is located in Chile
Capacity: 35,000	1991 Copa América is located in Chile
Viña del Mar	1991 Copa América is located in Chile
Estadio Sausalito	1991 Copa América is located in Chile
Capacity: 20,000	1991 Copa América is located in Chile
Valparaíso	1991 Copa América is located in Chile
Estadio Playa Ancha	1991 Copa América is located in Chile
Capacity: 19,000	1991 Copa América is located in Chile

== Squads ==
For a complete list of all participating squads: 1991 Copa América squads

== First round ==
The tournament was set up in two groups of five teams each. Each team played one match against each of the other teams within the same group. The top two teams in each group advanced to the final stage.

Two points were awarded for a win, one point for a draw, and no points for a loss.

- Tie-breaker
  - If teams finish leveled on points, the following tie-breakers are used:
  1. greater goal difference in all group games;
  2. greater number of goals scored in all group games;
  3. winner of the head-to-head match between the teams in question;
  4. drawing of lots.

=== Group A ===
Team	Pld	W	D	L	GF	GA	GD	Pts
Argentina	4	4	0	0	11	3	+8	8
Chile	4	3	0	1	10	3	+7	6
Paraguay	4	2	0	2	7	8	−1	4
Peru	4	1	0	3	9	9	0	2
Venezuela	4	0	0	4	1	15	−14	0

6 July 1991

Chile	2–0	Venezuela
Rubio 22'; Zamorano 34'

Estadio Nacional, Santiago
Attendance: 42,779
Referee: Armando Pérez Hoyos (Colombia)

6 July 1991

Paraguay	1–0	Peru
Monzón 21'

Estadio Nacional, Santiago
Attendance: 42,779
Referee: Ortubé (Bolivia)

8 July 1991

Chile	4–2	Peru
Rubio 16'; Contreras 51' (pen.); Zamorano 61', 74'		Maestri 59'; Del Solar 71'

Estadio Municipal, Concepción
Attendance: 18,798
Referee: Filippi (Uruguay)

8 July 1991

Argentina	3–0	Venezuela
Batistuta 28', 50' (pen.); Caniggia 43'

Estadio Nacional, Santiago
Attendance: 13,965
Referee: Milton Villavicencio (Ecuador)

10 July 1991

Paraguay	5–0	Venezuela
Neffa 34'; Guirland 38'; Monzón 75', 87' (pen.); V. Sanabria 81'

Estadio Nacional, Santiago
Attendance: 68,215
Referee: Juan Torres (Colombia)

10 July 1991

Argentina	1–0	Chile
Batistuta 81'

Estadio Nacional, Santiago
Attendance: 68,215
Referee: Wright (Brazil)

12 July 1991

Peru	5–1	Venezuela
La Rosa 9', 55'; Cavallo 21' (o.g.); Del Solar 58'; Hirano 62'		Del Solar 14' (o.g.)

Estadio Nacional, Santiago
Attendance: 13,876
Referee: Armando Pérez Hoyos (Colombia)

12 July 1991

Argentina	4–1	Paraguay
Batistuta 40'; Simeone 61'; Astrada 70'; Caniggia 81'		Cardozo 79'

Estadio Municipal, Concepción
Attendance: 10,070
Referee: Filippi (Uruguay)

14 July 1991

Argentina	3–2	Peru
Latorre 3'; Craviotto 51'; C. García 57'		Yáñez 35' (pen.); Hirano 65'

Estadio Nacional, Santiago
Attendance: 67,902
Referee: Ortubé (Bolivia)

14 July 1991

Chile	4–0	Paraguay
Rubio 12'; Zamorano 15'; Estay 63'; Vera 68'

Estadio Nacional, Santiago
Attendance: 67,902
Referee: Wright (Brazil)

=== Group B ===
Team	Pld	W	D	L	GF	GA	GD	Pts
Colombia	4	2	1	1	3	1	+2	5
Brazil	4	2	1	1	6	5	+1	5
Uruguay	4	1	3	0	4	3	+1	5
Ecuador	4	1	1	2	6	5	+1	3
Bolivia	4	0	2	2	2	7	−5	2

7 July 1991

Colombia	1–0	Ecuador
De Ávila 25'

Estadio Playa Ancha, Valparaíso
Attendance: 10,662
Referee: Escobar (Paraguay)

7 July 1991

Uruguay	1–1	Bolivia
Castro 73'		J. Suárez 16'

Estadio Playa Ancha, Valparaíso
Attendance: 13,828
Referee: Maciel (Paraguay)

9 July 1991

Uruguay	1–1	Ecuador
Méndez 49' (pen.)		Aguinaga 44'

Estadio Sausalito, Viña del Mar
Attendance: 5,547
Referee: Castro (Chile)

9 July 1991

Brazil	2–1	Bolivia
Neto 5' (pen.); Branco 47'	Report	E. Sánchez 89' (pen.)

Estadio Sausalito, Viña del Mar
Attendance: 18,430
Referee: José Ramírez (Peru)

11 July 1991

Colombia	0–0	Bolivia

Estadio Sausalito, Viña del Mar
Attendance: 15,448
Referee: Francisco Faría (Venezuela)

11 July 1991

Brazil	1–1	Uruguay
João Paulo 29'	Report	Méndez 66'

Estadio Sausalito, Viña del Mar
Attendance: 19,350
Referee: Loustau (Argentina)

13 July 1991

Ecuador	4–0	Bolivia
Aguinaga 32'; Avilés 42', 73'; Ramírez 80' (pen.)

Estadio Sausalito, Viña del Mar
Attendance: 15,583
Referee: Castro (Chile)

13 July 1991

Colombia	2–0	Brazil
De Ávila 35'; Iguarán 66'	Report

Estadio Sausalito, Viña del Mar
Attendance: 17,250
Referee: Maciel (Paraguay)

15 July 1991

Uruguay	1–0	Colombia
Méndez 19'

Estadio Sausalito, Viña del Mar
Attendance: 15,721
Referee: Loustau (Argentina)

15 July 1991

Brazil	3–1	Ecuador
Mazinho Oliveira 8'; Márcio Santos 54'; Luiz Henrique 89'	Report	Muñoz 12'

Estadio Sausalito, Viña del Mar
Attendance: 15,721
Referee: Escobar (Paraguay)

== Final round ==
Team	Pld	W	D	L	GF	GA	GD	Pts
Argentina	3	2	1	0	5	3	+2	5
Brazil	3	2	0	1	6	3	+3	4
Chile	3	0	2	1	1	3	−2	2
Colombia	3	0	1	2	2	5	−3	1

17 July 1991

Argentina	3–2	Brazil
Franco 1', 39'; Batistuta 46'	Report	Branco 5'; João Paulo 52'

Estadio Nacional, Santiago
Attendance: 44,005
Referee: Maciel (Paraguay)

17 July 1991

Chile	1–1	Colombia
Zamorano 74'		Iguarán 37'

Estadio Nacional, Santiago
Attendance: 44,005
Referee: Filippi (Uruguay)

19 July 1991

Argentina	0–0	Chile

Estadio Nacional, Santiago
Attendance: 37,612
Referee: Filippi (Uruguay)

19 July 1991

Brazil	2–0	Colombia
Renato 29'; Branco 76' (pen.)	Report

Estadio Nacional, Santiago
Attendance: 37,612
Referee: José Ramírez (Peru)

21 July 1991

Brazil	2–0	Chile
Mazinho Oliveira 8'; Luiz Henrique 55'	Report

Estadio Nacional, Santiago
Attendance: 45,104
Referee: Ortubé (Bolivia)

21 July 1991

Argentina	2–1	Colombia
Simeone 11'; Batistuta 19'		De Ávila 70'

Estadio Nacional, Santiago
Attendance: 45,104
Referee: Escobar (Paraguay)

== Result ==
1991 Copa América champions

Argentina
13th title

== Goalscorers ==
With six goals, Gabriel Batistuta was the top scorer in the tournament. There were 73 goals scored in 26 matches, for an average of 2.81 goals per match.

6 goals

- (Argentina) Gabriel Batistuta

5 goals

- (Chile) Iván Zamorano

3 goals

- (Brazil) Branco
- (Chile) Hugo Rubio
- (Colombia) Antony de Ávila
- (Paraguay) Luis Monzón
- (Uruguay) Peter Méndez

2 goals

- (Argentina) Claudio Caniggia
- (Argentina) Darío Franco
- (Argentina) Diego Simeone
- (Brazil) João Paulo
- (Brazil) Luiz Henrique
- (Brazil) Mazinho Oliveira
- (Colombia) Arnoldo Iguarán
- (Ecuador) Álex Aguinaga
- (Ecuador) Ney Avilés
- (Peru) José del Solar
- (Peru) Jorge Hirano
- (Peru) Eugenio La Rosa

1 goal

- (Argentina) Leonardo Astrada
- (Argentina) Néstor Craviotto
- (Argentina) Claudio García
- (Argentina) Diego Latorre
- (Bolivia) Erwin Sánchez
- (Bolivia) Juan Berthy Suárez
- (Brazil) Márcio Santos
- (Brazil) Neto
- (Brazil) Renato Gaúcho
- (Chile) Jorge Contreras
- (Chile) Fabián Estay
- (Chile) Jaime Vera
- (Ecuador) Carlos Muñoz
- (Ecuador) Erwin Ramírez
- (Paraguay) José Cardozo
- (Paraguay) Carlos Guirland
- (Paraguay) Gustavo Neffa
- (Paraguay) Vidal Sanabria
- (Peru) Alfonso Yáñez
- (Peru) Flavio Maestri
- (Uruguay) Ramón Castro

1 own goal

- (Peru) José del Solar (against Venezuela)
- (Venezuela) Robert Cavallo (against Peru)
