= Ecuador national football team results (1980–1999) =

This page details the match results and statistics of the Ecuador national football team from 1980 to 1999.

== Key ==
Key to matches

- Att.=Match attendance
- (H)=Home ground
- (A)=Away ground
- (N)=Neutral ground

Key to record by opponent

- Pld=Games played
- W=Games won
- D=Games drawn
- L=Games lost
- GF=Goals for
- GA=Goals against

== Results ==
Ecuador's score is shown first in each case.

No.	Date	Venue	Opponents	Score	Competition	Ecuador scorers	Att.	Ref.
124	27 January 1981	Quito (H)	Bulgaria	1–3	Friendly	W. Macias	20,000	
125	14 February 1981	Estadio Olímpico Atahualpa, Quito (H)	Brazil	0–6	Friendly		30,000	
126	17 May 1981	Estadio Modelo, Guayaquil (H)	Paraguay	1–0	1982 FIFA World Cup qualification	Klínger	55,000	
127	24 May 1981	Estadio Modelo, Guayaquil (H)	Chile	0–0	1982 FIFA World Cup qualification		50,000	
128	31 May 1981	Estadio Defensores del Chaco, Asunción (A)	Paraguay	1–3	1982 FIFA World Cup qualification	Nieves	37,000	
129	14 June 1981	Estadio Nacional, Santiago (A)	Chile	0–2	1982 FIFA World Cup qualification		80,000	
130	26 July 1983	Estadio Olímpico Atahualpa, Quito (H)	Colombia	0–0	Friendly		35,000	
131	29 July 1983	Estadio El Campín, Bogotá (A)	Colombia	0–0	Friendly		15,000	
132	10 August 1983	Estadio Olímpico Atahualpa, Quito (H)	Argentina	2–2	1983 Copa América	Vásquez, Vega	50,000	
133	17 August 1983	Estadio Olímpico Atahualpa, Quito (H)	Brazil	0–1	1983 Copa América		50,000	
134	1 September 1983	Estádio Serra Dourada, Goiânia (A)	Brazil	0–5	1983 Copa América		35,000	
135	7 September 1983	Estadio Monumental, Buenos Aires (A)	Argentina	2–2	1983 Copa América	Quiñónez, Maldonado	40,000	
136	30 November 1984	Hofstra Stadium, Hempstead (A)	United States	0–0	Friendly		–	
137	2 December 1984	Miami Orange Bowl, Miami (A)	United States	2–2	Friendly	Cuvi, Benítez	–	
138	4 December 1984	Los Angeles (N)	Mexico	2–3	Friendly	Negri, Villafuerte	25,000	
139	7 December 1984	Estadio Nacional, Tegucigalpa (A)	Honduras	0–0	Friendly		–	
140	9 December 1984	Estadio Nacional, Guatemala City (A)	Guatemala	0–1	Friendly		–	
141	12 December 1984	San Salvador (A)	El Salvador	0–0	Friendly		–	
142	6 February 1985	Estadio Modelo, Guayaquil (H)	East Germany	2–3	Friendly	Benítez, Cuvi	26,000	
143	10 February 1985	Quito (H)	East Germany	3–2	Friendly	Unknown	–	
144	17 February 1985	Estadio Bellavista, Ambato (H)	Finland	3–1	Friendly	Paz, Benítez (2)	12,000	
145	21 February 1985	Quito (H)	Bolivia	3–0	Friendly	Villafuerte, Benítez, Maldonado	–	
146	3 March 1985	Estadio Olímpico Atahualpa, Quito (H)	Chile	1–1	1986 FIFA World Cup qualification	Maldonado	56,000	
147	10 March 1985	Estadio Centenario, Montevideo (A)	Uruguay	1–2	1986 FIFA World Cup qualification	Cuvi	70,000	
148	17 March 1985	Estadio Nacional, Santiago (A)	Chile	2–6	1986 FIFA World Cup qualification	Baldeón (2)	70,000	
149	21 March 1985	Lima (A)	Peru	0–1	Friendly		10,000	
150	31 March 1985	Estadio Olímpico Atahualpa, Quito (H)	Uruguay	0–2	1986 FIFA World Cup qualification		30,000	
151	5 March 1987	Havana (A)	Cuba	1–2	Friendly	Unknown	–	
152	8 March 1987	Havana (A)	Cuba	0–0	Friendly		–	
153	31 March 1987	Estadio 9 de Mayo, Machala (H)	Cuba	0–1	Friendly		–	
154	2 April 1987	Azogues (H)	Cuba	0–0	Friendly		–	
155	11 June 1987	Estadio Atanasio Girardot, Medellín (A)	Colombia	0–1	Friendly		–	
156	14 June 1987	Estadio Modelo, Guayaquil (H)	Colombia	3–0	Friendly	Quiñónez, Baldeón, Marsetti	–	
157	19 July 1987	Estadio Centenario, Montevideo (A)	Uruguay	1–2	Friendly	Unknown	5,000	
158	21 July 1987	Estádio da Ressacada, Florianópolis (A)	Brazil	1–4	Friendly	Mera	7,039	
159	2 July 1987	Estadio Monumental, Buenos Aires (N)	Argentina	0–3	1987 Copa América		30,000	
160	4 July 1987	Estadio Monumental, Buenos Aires (N)	Peru	1–1	1987 Copa América	Cuvi	10,000	
161	7 June 1988	University Stadium, Albuquerque (A)	United States	1–0	Friendly	Aguinaga	8,500	
162	10 June 1988	Delmar Stadium, Houston (A)	United States	2–0	Friendly	Aguinaga, Muñoz	10,500	
163	12 June 1988	Herman Clark Stadium, Fort Worth (A)	United States	0–0	Friendly		6,000	
164	15 June 1988	Estadio Nacional, Tegucigalpa (A)	Honduras	1–1	Friendly	Capurro	15,000	
165	17 June 1988	Estadio Nacional, Tegucigalpa (A)	Honduras	1–0	Friendly	Unknown	–	
166	7 September 1988	Estadio Monumental, Guayaquil (H)	Paraguay	1–5	Friendly	Cuvi	30,000	
167	13 September 1988	La Serena (A)	Chile	1–3	Friendly	Cuvi	4,000	
168	27 September 1988	Asunción (N)	Uruguay	1–2	Copa Boquerón	Izquierdo	10,000	
169	29 September 1988	Asunción (N)	Chile	0–0	Copa Boquerón		15,000	
170	29 January 1989	Estadio Monumental, Guayaquil (H)	Chile	1–0	Friendly	Avilés	10,000	
171	15 March 1989	Verdão, Cuiabá (A)	Brazil	0–1	Friendly		54,815	
172	13 April 1989	Estadio Monumental, Guayaquil (H)	Argentina	2–2	Friendly	Avilés, Cuvi	30,000	
173	3 May 1989	Estadio Centenario, Montevideo (A)	Uruguay	1–3	Friendly	Avilés	15,000	
174	23 May 1989	Estadio Olímpico Atahualpa, Quito (H)	Uruguay	1–1	Friendly	Avilés	20,000	
175	20 June 1989	Port of Spain (N)	Peru	1–2	Trinidad Soccer Bowl	N. Guerrero	5,000	
176	2 July 1989	Estádio Serra Dourada, Goiânia (N)	Uruguay	1–0	1989 Copa América	Benítez	19,000	
177	4 July 1989	Estádio Serra Dourada, Goiânia (N)	Argentina	0–0	1989 Copa América		12,000	
178	6 July 1989	Estádio Serra Dourada, Goiânia (N)	Bolivia	0–0	1989 Copa América		3,000	
179	10 July 1989	Estádio Serra Dourada, Goiânia (N)	Chile	1–2	1989 Copa América	Avilés	2,000	
180	20 August 1989	Estadio Metropolitano, Barranquilla (A)	Colombia	0–2	1990 FIFA World Cup qualification		70,000	
181	3 September 1989	Estadio Modelo, Guayaquil (H)	Colombia	0–0	1990 FIFA World Cup qualification		40,000	
182	10 September 1989	Estadio Defensores del Chaco, Asunción (A)	Paraguay	1–2	1990 FIFA World Cup qualification	Avilés	60,000	
183	24 September 1989	Estadio Monumental, Guayaquil (H)	Paraguay	3–1	1990 FIFA World Cup qualification	Aguinaga, Marsetti, Avilés	16,000	
184	6 June 1991	Estadio Nacional, Lima (A)	Peru	1–0	Friendly	Ron	10,000	
185	19 June 1991	Estadio Monumental, Guayaquil (H)	Chile	2–1	Friendly	Garay, J. Guerrero	23,522	
186	25 June 1991	Estadio Monumental, Guayaquil (H)	Peru	2–2	Friendly	Muñoz, Carcelén	16,511	
187	30 June 1991	Estadio Nacional, Santiago (A)	Chile	1–3	Friendly	Aguinaga	40,000	
188	7 July 1991	Estadio Playa Ancha, Valparaíso (N)	Colombia	0–1	1991 Copa América		15,000	
189	9 July 1991	Estadio Sausalito, Viña del Mar (N)	Uruguay	1–1	1991 Copa América	Aguinaga	18,000	
190	13 July 1991	Estadio Sausalito, Viña del Mar (N)	Bolivia	4–0	1991 Copa América	Aguinaga, Avilés (2), E. Ramírez	19,000	
191	15 July 1991	Estadio Sausalito, Viña del Mar (N)	Brazil	1–3	1991 Copa América	Muñoz	30,000	
192	24 May 1992	Estadio Nacional, Guatemala City (A)	Guatemala	1–1	Friendly	E. Hurtado	15,000	
193	27 May 1992	Estadio Nacional, San José (A)	Costa Rica	1–2	Friendly	Carabalí	1,250	
194	4 July 1992	Estadio Centenario, Montevideo (A)	Uruguay	1–3	Friendly	Fernández	15,000	
195	6 August 1992	Estadio Monumental, Guayaquil (H)	Costa Rica	1–1	Friendly	B. Tenorio	8,000	
196	24 November 1992	Estadio Nacional, Lima (A)	Peru	1–1	Friendly	Zambrano	7,000	
197	27 January 1993	Estadio Monumental, Guayaquil (H)	Belarus	1–1	Friendly	Fernández	38,000	
198	31 January 1993	Estadio Monumental, Guayaquil (H)	Romania	3–0	Friendly	E. Hurtado, Gavica, Avilés	10,000	
199	30 May 1993	Estadio Olímpico Atahualpa, Quito (H)	Peru	1–0	Friendly	Fernández	24,000	
200	9 June 1993	Estadio Olímpico Atahualpa, Quito (H)	Chile	1–2	Friendly	Avilés	40,000	
201	15 June 1993	Estadio Olímpico Atahualpa, Quito (N)	Venezuela	6–1	1993 Copa América	Muñoz, Noriega, Fernández (2), E. Hurtado, Aguinaga	45,000	
202	19 June 1993	Estadio Olímpico Atahualpa, Quito (N)	United States	2–0	1993 Copa América	Avilés, E. Hurtado	45,000	
203	22 June 1993	Estadio Olímpico Atahualpa, Quito (N)	Uruguay	2–1	1993 Copa América	Avilés, Aguinaga	45,000	
204	26 June 1993	Estadio Olímpico Atahualpa, Quito (N)	Paraguay	3–0	1993 Copa América	E. Hurtado, M. Ramírez (o.g.), Avilés	45,000	
205	30 June 1993	Estadio Olímpico Atahualpa, Quito (N)	Mexico	0–2	1993 Copa América		45,000	
206	3 July 1993	Estadio Reales Tamarindos, Portoviejo (N)	Colombia	0–1	1993 Copa América		18,000	
207	18 July 1993	Estadio Monumental, Guayaquil (H)	Brazil	0–0	1994 FIFA World Cup qualification		40,000	
208	1 August 1993	Estadio Centenario, Montevideo (A)	Uruguay	0–0	1994 FIFA World Cup qualification		55,000	
209	8 August 1993	Estadio Olímpico Atahualpa, Quito (H)	Venezuela	5–0	1994 FIFA World Cup qualification	Muñoz, E. Hurtado (3), Chalá	18,000	
210	15 August 1993	Estadio Hernando Siles, La Paz (A)	Bolivia	0–1	1994 FIFA World Cup qualification		35,000	
211	22 August 1993	Estádio do Morumbi, São Paulo (A)	Brazil	0–2	1994 FIFA World Cup qualification		77,916	
212	5 September 1993	Estadio Monumental, Guayaquil (H)	Uruguay	0–1	1994 FIFA World Cup qualification		60,000	
213	12 September 1993	Polideportivo Cachamay, Ciudad Guayana (A)	Venezuela	1–2	1994 FIFA World Cup qualification	Noriega	2,000	
214	19 September 1993	Estadio Olímpico Atahualpa, Quito (H)	Bolivia	1–1	1994 FIFA World Cup qualification	Noriega	1,000	
215	29 May 1994	Estadio Monumental, Guayaquil (H)	Argentina	1–0	Friendly	B. Tenorio	45,000	
216	5 June 1994	Wakefield Memorial High School, Wakefield (N)	South Korea	2–1	Friendly	Ron (2)	3,000	
217	17 August 1994	Lima (A)	Peru	0–2	Friendly		12,000	
218	21 September 1994	Estadio 9 de Mayo, Machala (N)	Peru	0–0	Friendly		–	
219	24 May 1995	Toyama Park Stadium, Toyama (N)	Scotland	1–2	1995 Kirin Cup	I. Hurtado	5,669	
220	28 May 1995	National Stadium, Tokyo (N)	Japan	0–3	1995 Kirin Cup		50,000	
221	4 June 1995	Changwon Stadium, Changwon (N)	Zambia	4–0	1995 Korea Cup	E. Hurtado (4)	18,000	
222	10 June 1995	Dongdaemun Stadium, Seoul (N)	Costa Rica	2–1	1995 Korea Cup	E. Hurtado, Díaz	50,000	
223	12 June 1995	Dongdaemun Stadium, Seoul (N)	Zambia	1–0	1995 Korea Cup	Díaz	25,000	
224	30 June 1995	Estadio Defensores del Chaco, Asunción (A)	Paraguay	0–1	Friendly		–	
225	7 July 1995	Estadio Atilio Paiva Olivera, Rivera (N)	Brazil	0–1	1995 Copa América		10,000	
226	10 July 1995	Estadio Atilio Paiva Olivera, Rivera (N)	Colombia	0–1	1995 Copa América		8,000	
227	13 July 1995	Estadio Atilio Paiva Olivera, Rivera (N)	Peru	2–1	1995 Copa América	Díaz, Mora	10,000	
228	25 October 1995	Estadio Ramón Tahuichi Aguilera, Santa Cruz de la Sierra (A)	Bolivia	2–2	Friendly	E. Tenorio, E. Hurtado	30,000	
229	2 February 1996	Brígido Iriarte Stadium, Caracas (A)	Venezuela	1–0	Friendly	Fernández	6,000	
230	11 February 1996	Bourj Hammoud Stadium, Beirut (A)	Lebanon	0–1	Friendly		6,000	
231	16 February 1996	Riyadh (N)	Oman	2–0	Friendly	E. Hurtado, Fernández	1,000	
232	18 February 1996	Jassim bin Hamad Stadium, Doha (A)	Qatar	1–1	Friendly	E. Hurtado	1,000	
233	23 February 1996	Kuwait City (A)	Kuwait	3–0	Friendly	M. Tenorio, E. Hurtado, Batallas	1,000	
234	25 February 1996	Jassim bin Hamad Stadium, Doha (A)	Qatar	2–1	Friendly	E. Hurtado, Fernández	–	
235	24 April 1996	Estadio Monumental, Guayaquil (H)	Peru	4–1	1998 FIFA World Cup qualification	E. Hurtado (2), M. Tenorio, Gavica	60,000	
236	2 June 1996	Estadio Olímpico Atahualpa, Quito (H)	Argentina	2–0	1998 FIFA World Cup qualification	Montaño, E. Hurtado	41,500	
237	30 June 1996	Estadio Reales Tamarindos, Portoviejo (H)	Armenia	3–0	Friendly	De Souza, Fernández, Gavica	12,000	
238	6 July 1996	Estadio Nacional, Santiago (A)	Chile	1–4	1998 FIFA World Cup qualification	Aguinaga	69,000	
239	16 August 1996	Estadio Alejandro Serrano Aguilar, Cuenca (H)	Costa Rica	1–1	Friendly	Fernández	4,980	
240	1 September 1996	Estadio Olímpico Atahualpa, Quito (H)	Venezuela	1–0	1998 FIFA World Cup qualification	Aguinaga	45,000	
241	4 October 1996	Estadio Bellavista, Ambato (H)	Jamaica	2–1	Friendly	Delgado (2)	18,000	
242	9 October 1996	Estadio Olímpico Atahualpa, Quito (H)	Colombia	0–1	1998 FIFA World Cup qualification		45,000	
243	23 October 1996	Oakland Coliseum, Oakland (N)	Mexico	1–0	Friendly	Carabalí	27,528	
244	10 November 1996	Estadio Defensores del Chaco, Asunción (A)	Paraguay	0–1	1998 FIFA World Cup qualification		31,002	
245	12 January 1997	Estadio Hernando Siles, La Paz (A)	Bolivia	0–2	1998 FIFA World Cup qualification		37,000	
246	5 February 1997	Estadio Azteca, Mexico City (A)	Mexico	1–3	Friendly	Delgado	30,000	
247	12 February 1997	Estadio Olímpico Atahualpa, Quito (H)	Uruguay	4–0	1998 FIFA World Cup qualification	Aguinaga, Delgado (2), Chalá	18,000	
248	25 March 1997	Estadio Nacional, Guatemala City (A)	Guatemala	0–0	Friendly		8,000	
249	2 April 1997	Estadio Nacional, Lima (A)	Peru	1–1	1998 FIFA World Cup qualification	Aguinaga	42,229	
250	30 April 1997	Estadio Monumental, Buenos Aires (A)	Argentina	1–2	1998 FIFA World Cup qualification	Aguinaga	65,000	
251	28 May 1997	Estadio Cuscatlán, San Salvador (A)	El Salvador	2–0	Friendly	Graziani, De la Cruz	8,000	
252	8 June 1997	Estadio Olímpico Atahualpa, Quito (H)	Chile	1–1	1998 FIFA World Cup qualification	Graziani	42,820	
253	11 June 1997	Estadio Félix Capriles, Cochabamba (N)	Argentina	0–0	1997 Copa América		17,000	
254	14 June 1997	Estadio Félix Capriles, Cochabamba (N)	Paraguay	2–0	1997 Copa América	Sánchez, Graziani	5,000	
255	17 June 1997	Estadio Félix Capriles, Cochabamba (N)	Chile	2–1	1997 Copa América	Graziani, Gavica	8,000	
256	22 June 1997	Estadio Félix Capriles, Cochabamba (N)	Mexico	1–1 (3–4p)	1997 Copa América	Capurro	15,000	
257	6 July 1997	Estadio José Pachencho Romero, Maracaibo (A)	Venezuela	1–1	1998 FIFA World Cup qualification	I. Hurtado	3,000	
258	20 July 1997	Estadio Metropolitano, Barranquilla (A)	Colombia	0–1	1998 FIFA World Cup qualification		30,000	
259	7 August 1997	Memorial Stadium, Baltimore (A)	United States	1–0	Friendly	Sánchez	13,629	
260	20 August 1997	Estadio Olímpico Atahualpa, Quito (H)	Paraguay	2–1	1998 FIFA World Cup qualification	Aguinaga, Graziani	12,000	
261	10 September 1997	Estádio Fonte Nova, Salvador (A)	Brazil	2–4	Friendly	Aguinaga, Montaño	40,000	
262	12 October 1997	Estadio Monumental, Guayaquil (H)	Bolivia	1–0	1998 FIFA World Cup qualification	Graziani	40,000	
263	16 November 1997	Estadio Centenario, Montevideo (A)	Uruguay	3–5	1998 FIFA World Cup qualification	Graziani (3)	12,000	
264	14 October 1998	Robert F. Kennedy Memorial Stadium, Washington, D.C. (N)	Brazil	1–5	Friendly	De la Cruz	18,116	
265	28 January 1999	Estadio Alejandro Morera Soto, Alajuela (A)	Costa Rica	0–0	Friendly		15,000	
266	3 February 1999	Estadio Nacional, Guatemala City (A)	Guatemala	0–0	Friendly		15,000	
267	10 February 1999	Estadio Nacional, Lima (A)	Peru	2–1	Friendly	E. Hurtado (2)	10,000	
268	17 February 1999	Estadio Monumental, Guayaquil (H)	Peru	1–2	Friendly	Chalá	15,000	
269	14 April 1999	Estadio Tecnológico, Monterrey (A)	Mexico	0–0	Friendly		40,000	
270	19 May 1999	Estadio Reales Tamarindos, Portoviejo (H)	Venezuela	0–2	Friendly		23,000	
271	2 June 1999	Commonwealth Stadium, Edmonton (N)	Iran	1–1	1999 Canada Cup	Rivera	5,821	
272	4 June 1999	Commonwealth Stadium, Edmonton (N)	Guatemala	3–1	1999 Canada Cup	Graziani (2), Delgado	8,865	
273	6 June 1999	Commonwealth Stadium, Edmonton (N)	Canada	2–1	1999 Canada Cup	Graziani, De Vos (o.g.)	10,026	
274	15 June 1999	Estadio Polideportivo de Pueblo Nuevo, San Cristóbal (A)	Venezuela	2–3	Friendly	Montaño, Delgado	9,000	
275	22 June 1999	Estadio Nacional, Santiago (A)	Chile	0–0	Friendly		18,000	
276	1 July 1999	Estadio Feliciano Cáceres, Luque (N)	Argentina	1–3	1999 Copa América	Kaviedes	20,000	
277	4 July 1999	Estadio Feliciano Cáceres, Luque (N)	Uruguay	1–2	1999 Copa América	Kaviedes	18,000	
278	7 July 1999	Estadio Feliciano Cáceres, Luque (N)	Colombia	1–2	1999 Copa América	Graziani	20,000	
279	12 October 1999	Estadio Centenario, Montevideo (A)	Uruguay	0–0	Friendly		3,779	
280	27 October 1999	Robertson Stadium, Houston (N)	Mexico	0–0	Friendly		30,000	

== Record by opponent ==
Team	Pld	W	D	L	GF	GA	GD	WPCT
Argentina	10	2	5	3	11	14	−3	20.00
Armenia	1	1	0	0	3	0	+3	100.00
Belarus	1	0	1	0	1	1	0	0.00
Bolivia	8	3	3	2	11	6	+5	37.50
Brazil	11	0	1	10	5	32	−27	0.00
Bulgaria	1	0	0	1	1	3	−2	0.00
Canada	1	1	0	0	2	1	+1	100.00
Chile	15	3	5	7	14	26	−12	20.00
Colombia	12	1	3	8	4	10	−6	8.33
Costa Rica	5	1	3	1	5	5	0	20.00
Cuba	4	0	2	2	1	3	−2	0.00
East Germany	2	1	0	1	5	5	0	50.00
El Salvador	2	1	1	0	2	0	+2	50.00
Finland	1	1	0	0	3	1	+2	100.00
Guatemala	5	1	3	1	4	3	+1	20.00
Honduras	3	1	2	0	2	1	+1	33.33
Iran	1	0	1	0	1	1	0	0.00
Jamaica	1	1	0	0	2	1	+1	100.00
Japan	1	0	0	1	0	3	−3	0.00
Kuwait	1	1	0	0	3	0	+3	100.00
Lebanon	1	0	0	1	0	1	−1	0.00
Mexico	7	1	3	3	5	9	−4	14.29
Oman	1	1	0	0	2	0	+2	100.00
Paraguay	10	5	0	5	14	14	0	50.00
Peru	14	5	5	4	17	15	+2	35.71
Qatar	2	1	1	0	3	2	+1	50.00
Romania	1	1	0	0	3	0	+3	100.00
Scotland	1	0	0	1	1	2	−1	0.00
South Korea	1	1	0	0	2	1	+1	100.00
United States	7	4	3	0	8	2	+6	57.14
Uruguay	16	3	4	9	18	25	−7	18.75
Venezuela	8	4	1	3	17	9	+8	50.00
Zambia	2	2	0	0	5	0	+5	100.00
Total	157	47	47	63	175	196	−21	29.94

Source: Results
