= List of Ecuador international footballers =

The Ecuador national football team has represented Ecuador in international football since 1926. Organized by the Ecuadorian Football Federation (Spanish: Federación Ecuatoriana de Fútbol), it is one of the 10 members of CONMEBOL. The team's first international was a 1–1 draw to Bolivia on 8 August 1938 in the Bolivarian Games.

Only players with 20 or more official caps are included in this list.

== Players ==
Key
§	Player is active with Ecuador and has been called up to the squad within the last 12 months
**Bold**	Player is still active to be called-up

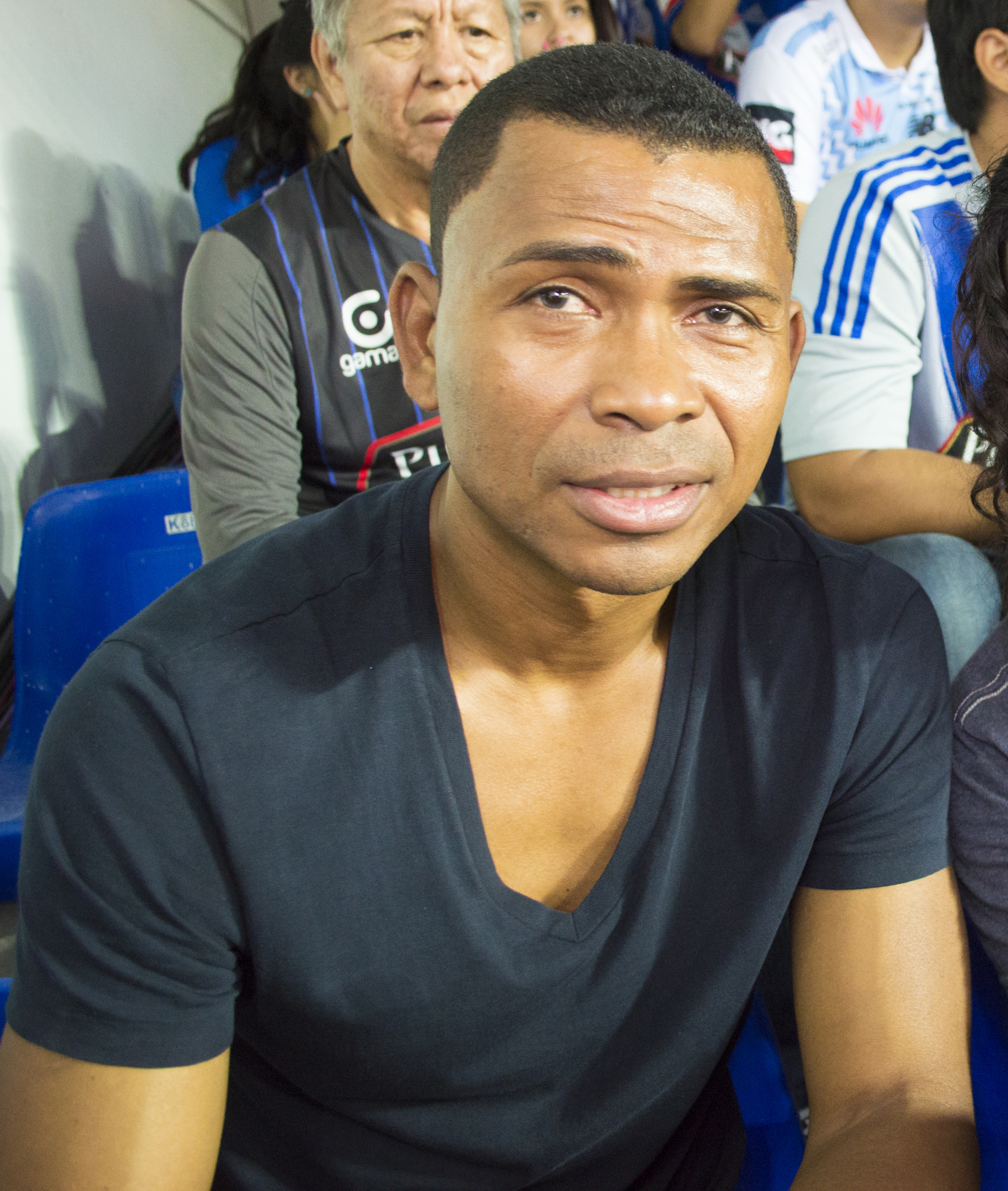
Iván Hurtado is Ecuador's most capped international of all time with 168 caps.

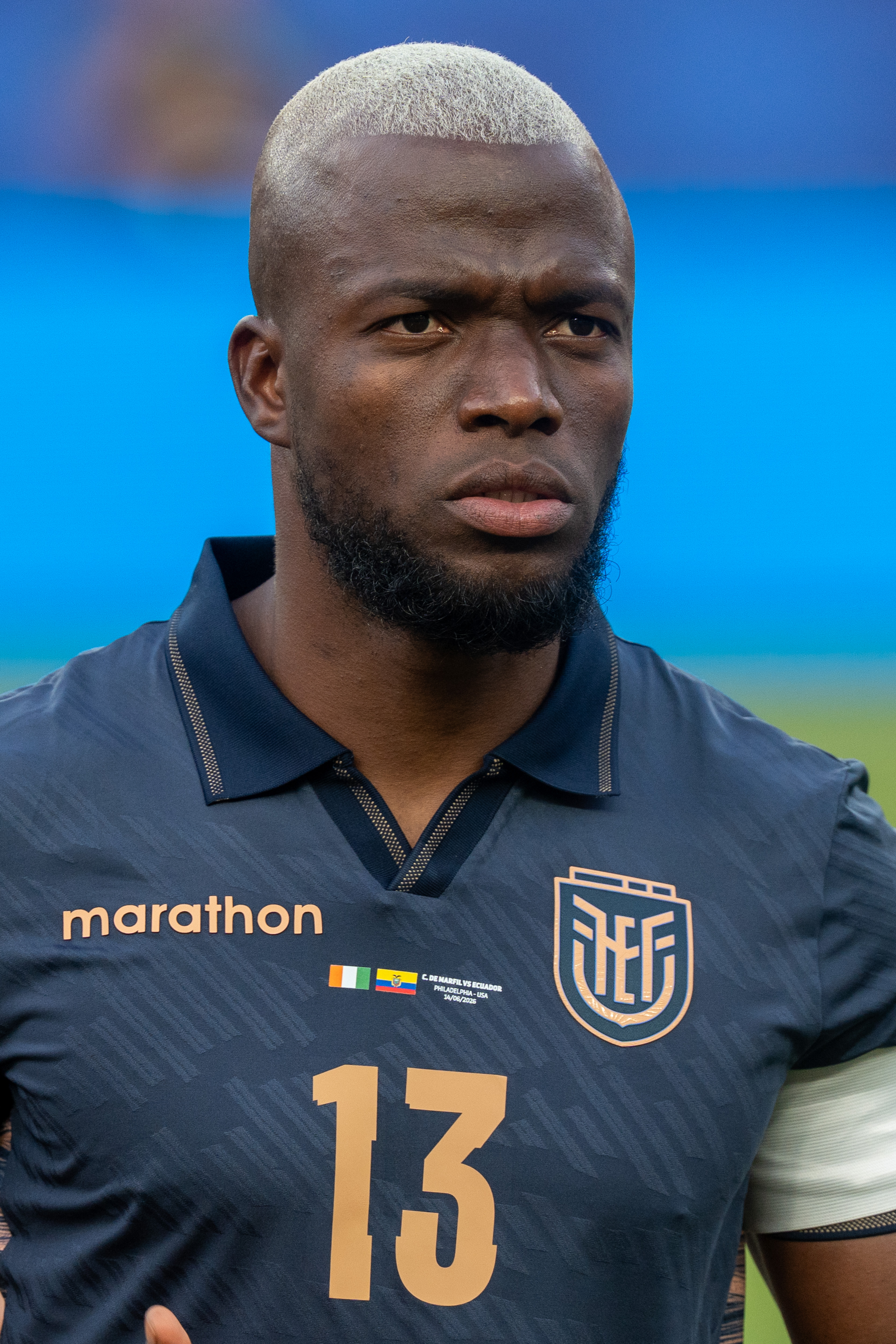
Enner Valencia is Ecuador's top goalscorer with 49 goals from 109 caps.

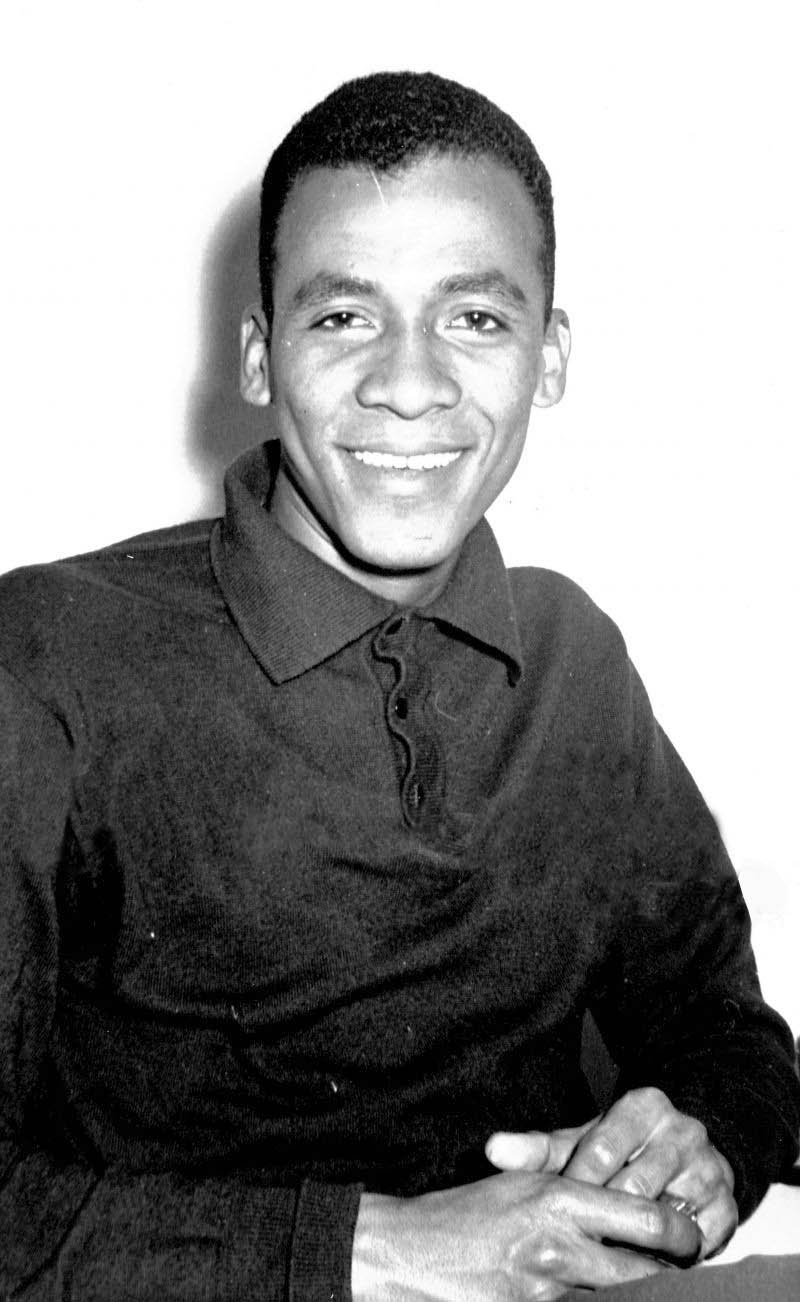
Alberto Spencer (national career 1959–1972) (11 caps, 4 goals) was selected as the 20th-best South American player of 20th century in an IFFHS poll.

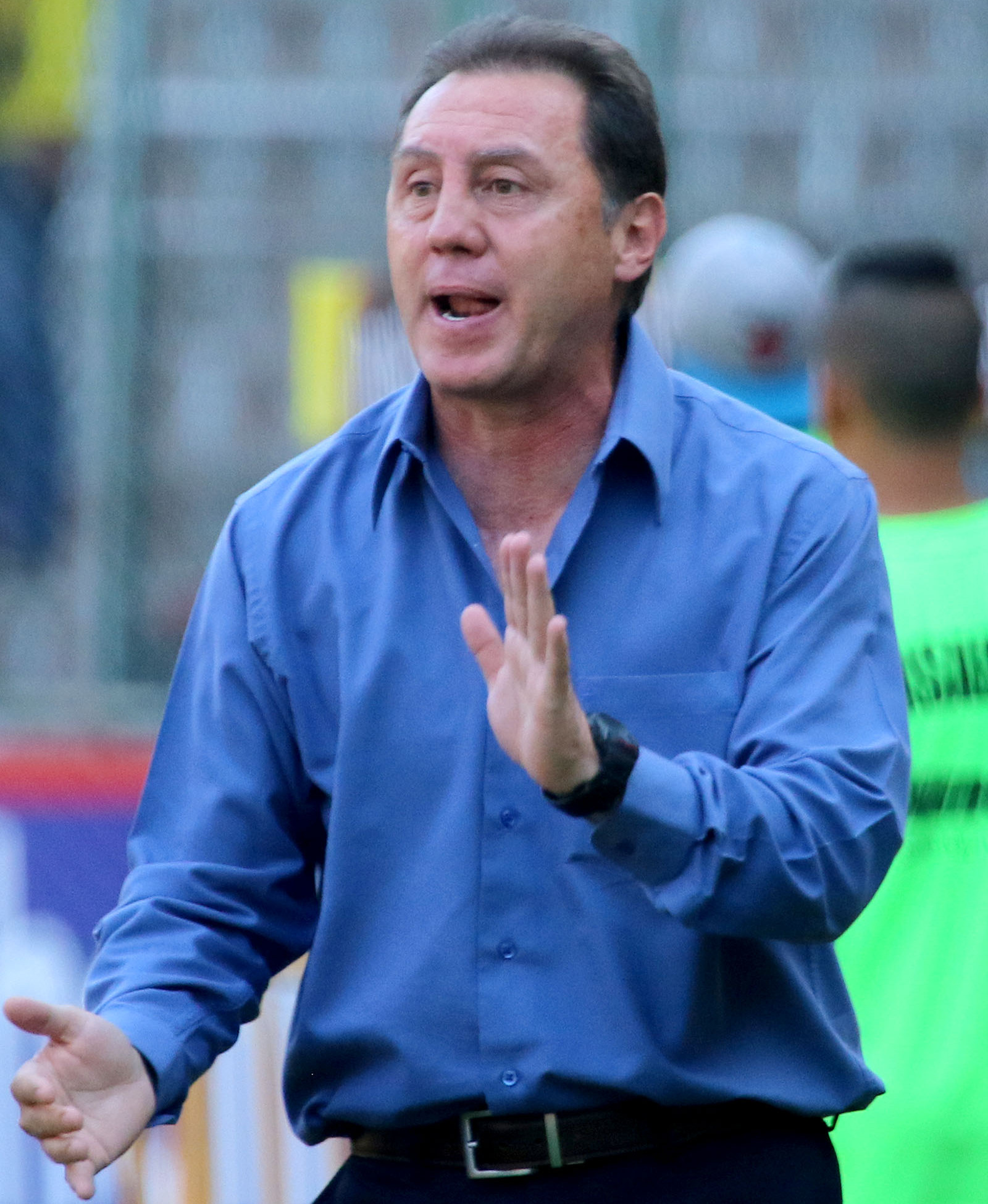
Álex Aguinaga (109 caps, 23 goals) is the first player to earn 100 caps for Ecuador on 20 November 2002.

Player	Caps	Goals	National career
Iván Hurtado	168	4	1992–2014
Walter Ayoví	121	8	2001–2017
Édison Méndez	111	18	2000–2014
**Enner Valencia**	109	49	2012–2026
Álex Aguinaga	109	23	1987–2004
Ulises de la Cruz	101	6	1995–2010
Luis Capurro	100	1	1985–2003
Antonio Valencia	99	11	2004–2019
Giovanny Espinoza	90	3	2000–2009
Segundo Castillo	88	9	2003–2015
José Cevallos	88	0	1994–2009
Cléber Chalá	86	6	1992–2004
Christian Noboa	83	4	2009–2021
**Alexander Domínguez**	78	0	2011–2024
Edwin Tenorio	78	0	1998–2007
Ángel Fernández	77	12	1991–2004
Marlon Ayoví	76	5	1998–2007
**Juan Carlos Paredes**	75	0	2010–2019
Eduardo Hurtado	74	26	1992–2000
Agustín Delgado	72	31	1994–2011
Felipe Caicedo	66	22	2005–2017
**Moisés Caicedo**	65	3	2020–2026
**Carlos Gruezo**	65	1	2014–2024
Jorge Guagua	64	2	2001–2015
**Alan Franco**	64	1	2018–2026
**Jefferson Montero**	63	10	2007–2018
Frickson Erazo	63	2	2011–2018
Arturo Mina	62	8	2014–2024
Christian Benítez	61	25	2005–2013
**Ángel Mena**	61	7	2015–2024
**Ángelo Preciado**	61	0	2018–2026
**Pervis Estupiñán**	58	5	2019–2026
Héctor Carabalí	58	2	1992–1999
Alfonso Obregón	58	0	1995–2004
Iván Kaviedes	57	16	1998–2011
Alberto Montaño	57	3	1992–2000
**Piero Hincapié**	56	3	2021–2026
Néicer Reasco	56	0	2000–2011
Raúl Avilés	55	16	1987–1993
**Gonzalo Plata**	54	9	2019–2026
Byron Tenorio	53	3	1988–1997
Gabriel Achilier	53	1	2008–2019
**Félix Torres**	52	5	2019–2026
Carlos Tenorio	51	12	2001–2009
Hólger Quiñónez	50	0	1984–1999
Luis Saritama	50	0	2003–2014
**Renato Ibarra**	49	1	2011–2020
Hamilton Cuvi	45	7	1983–1989
Wellington Sánchez	44	3	1994–2003
José Villafuerte	42	4	2017–2025
**Michael Estrada**	41	8	2017–2023
**Willian Pacho**	41	2	2023–2026
**Hernán Galíndez**	41	0	2021–2026
**Jaime Ayoví**	40	9	2010–2016
Nixon Carcelén	40	1	1991–1999
Carlos Luis Morales	40	0	1987–1999
**Robert Arboleda**	39	2	2016–2024
Máximo Tenorio	38	3	1992–1997
Augusto Poroso	38	1	1999–2003
**Jhegson Méndez**	38	0	2018–2025
Jacinto Espinoza	38	0	1992–2004
Máximo Banguera	37	0	2008–2019
**Fidel Martínez**	36	8	2008–2021
Kléber Fajardo	36	0	1987–1994
Carlos Muñoz	35	4	1989–1993
**Kevin Rodríguez**	35	2	2022–2026
Paul Ambrossi	35	0	2003–2009
Ariel Graziani	34	15	1997–2000
José Gavica	34	4	1992–2003
**Joao Rojas**	34	2	2008–2015
Raúl Guerrón	34	0	2000–2004
Wilson Macías	33	0	1987–1991
David Quiroz	31	0	2004–2012
**Michael Arroyo**	30	5	2010–2017
**John Yeboah**	30	3	2024–2026
Jimmy Blandón	30	0	1997–2000
Christian Lara	29	4	2002–2009
Juan Carlos Garay	28	4	1991–1996
Félix Lasso	27	7	1966–1975
**Romario Ibarra**	27	3	2017–2022
**Ayrton Preciado**	27	3	2017–2022
Lupo Quiñónez	27	3	1981–1987
Patricio Urrutia	27	3	2004–2008
Raúl Noriega	27	2	1988–1997
**Kendry Páez**	27	2	2023–2026
Jorge Bolaños	27	0	1960–1973
Dannes Coronel	27	0	1992–2000
Oswaldo Ibarra	27	0	1997–2004
**Jordy Caicedo**	26	4	2021–2026
Franklin Salas	26	2	2000–2011
**Jeremy Sarmiento**	26	2	2021–2026
Carlos Delgado	26	0	1972–1983
**Miller Bolaños**	25	8	2015–2018
Pietro Marsetti	25	3	1987–1989
Pedro Quiñónez	25	0	2007–2017
**Alan Minda**	24	2	2024–2026
Vinicio Ron	24	2	1977–1984
José Balseca	24	1	1953–1963
Flavio Perlaza	24	1	1979–1985
**Pedro Vite**	24	1	2023–2026
Óscar Bagüí	24	0	2005–2017
Wagner Rivera	24	0	1995–1997
Luciano Macías	23	2	1957–1969
Cristóbal Mantilla	23	2	1972–1979
Fausto Klinger	23	1	1975–1979
Jefferson Camacho	23	0	1972–1977
Marcelo Elizaga	23	0	2007–2011
Félix Borja	22	3	2005–2011
**Juan Cazares**	22	1	2014–2021
Orly Klinger	22	1	1981–1985
**Cristian Ramírez**	22	1	2013–2026
Carlos Sánchez	22	0	1947–1957
Jaime Baldeón	21	4	1981–1987
**Nilson Angulo**	21	3	2021–2026
Isaac Mina	21	2	2008–2011
Luis Mendoza	21	1	1941–1947
**José Cifuentes**	21	0	2019–2024
Luis Granda	21	0	1977–1983
José María Jiménez	20	5	1942–1949
Hans Maldonado	20	4	1983–1985
Paul "Polo" Carrera	20	3	1966–1983
**Xavier Arreaga**	20	1	2017–2025
**Leonardo Campana**	20	1	2019–2026
Clímaco Cañarte	20	1	1955–1966
Nicolás Asencio	20	0	1995–2003
Alfredo Bonnard	20	0	1953–1965
Oswaldo Minda	20	0	2008–2014
Christian Mora	20	0	2005–2009
**Joel Ordóñez**	20	0	2024–2026
**Jefferson Orejuela**	20	0	2016–2019
Víctor Peláez	20	0	1972–1975

== See also ==
- Football in Ecuador
