= 1993 in Ecuadorian football =

Football in Ecuador
- Season: 1993

The 1993 season is the 71st season of competitive football in Ecuador.

== National leagues ==
=== Serie A ===
- Champion: Emelec (6th title)
- International cup qualifiers:
  - 1994 Copa Libertadores: Emelec, Barcelona
  - 1994 Copa CONMEBOL: Green Cross, El Nacional
- Relegated: Técnico Universitario, Santos

=== Serie B ===
- Winner: ESPOLI (1st title)
- Promoted: ESPOLI, LDU Portoviejo
- Relegated: Universidad Católica, Audaz Octubrino

=== Segunda ===
- Winner: Olmedo (1st title)
- Promoted: Olmedo, Panamá

== National teams ==
=== Senior team ===
The Ecuador national team played eighteen matches in 1993: eight World Cup qualifiers, six at the Copa América, and four friendlies. Montenegrin manager Dušan Drašković resigned from his post this year after the team after failing to qualify to the 1994 FIFA World Cup.

==== 1994 FIFA World Cup qualifiers ====
Qualification to the 1994 FIFA World Cup in the United States took place in 1993. Ecuador was placed into Group B with Brazil, Bolivia, Uruguay, and Venezuela. They finished in 4th place and failed to qualify to the global tournament.

Team	Pld	W	D	L	GF	GA	GD	Pts
Brazil	8	5	2	1	20	4	+16	12
Bolivia	8	5	1	2	22	11	+11	11
Uruguay	8	4	2	2	10	7	+3	10
Ecuador	8	1	3	4	7	7	0	5
Venezuela	8	1	0	7	4	34	−30	2

18 July 1993

Ecuador	0 – 0	Brazil

Estadio Monumental Isidro Romero Carbo, Guayaquil
Attendance: 80,000
Referee: Juan Carlos Loustau (Argentina)

1 August 1993

Uruguay	0 – 0	Ecuador

Estadio Centenario, Montevideo
Attendance: 45,000
Referee: Alberto Tejada (Peru)

August 1993

Ecuador	5 – 0	Venezuela
Muñoz 23'; E. Hurtado 40', 50', 76'; Chalá 60'

Estadio Olímpico Atahualpa, Quito
Attendance: 15,000
Referee: Francisco Lamolina (Argentina)

15 August 1993

Bolivia	1 – 0	Ecuador
Ramallo 18'

Estadio Hernando Siles, La Paz
Attendance: 47,500
Referee: Hernán Silva (Chile)

22 August 1993

Brazil	2 – 0	Ecuador
Bebeto 34'; Dunga 54'

Estádio do Morumbi, São Paulo
Attendance: 78,000
Referee: José Torres (Colombia)

5 September 1993

Ecuador	0 – 1	Uruguay
		Sosa 10'

Estadio Monumental Isidro Romero Carbo, Guayaquil
Attendance: 55,000
Referee: Enrique Marín (Chile)

12 September 1993

Venezuela	2 – 1	Ecuador
García 1'; Morales 51'		B. Tenorio 5'

Polideportivo Cachamay, Ciudad Guayana
Attendance: 3,000
Referee: Fernando Chappell (Peru)

19 September 1993

Ecuador	1 – 1	Bolivia
Noriega 72'		Ramallo 45'

Estadio Monumental Isidro Romero Carbo, Guayaquil
Attendance: 10,000
Referee: John Toro (Colombia)

==== Copa América ====
Ecuador played host to the 1993 Copa América.

===== Group stage =====
They were drawn into Group A with Uruguay, Venezuela, and the United States. They went undefeated in group play and advanced to the Round of 16.

Team	Pld	W	D	L	GF	GA	GD	Pts
Ecuador	3	3	0	0	10	2	+8	6
Uruguay	3	1	1	1	4	4	0	3
Venezuela	3	0	2	1	6	11	−5	2
United States	3	0	1	2	3	6	−3	1

15 June 1993

Ecuador	6 – 1	Venezuela
Muñoz 19'; Noriega 32'; Fernández 57', 81'; E. Hurtado 65'; Aguinaga 84'		Dolgetta 79'

Estadio Olímpico Atahualpa, Quito
Attendance: 45,000
Referee: Francisco Lamolina (Argentina)

19 June 1993

Ecuador	2 – 0	United States
Avilés 11'; E. Hurtado 35'

Estadio Olímpico Atahualpa, Quito
Attendance: 45,000
Referee: Iván Guerrero (Chile)

22 June 1993

Ecuador	2–1	Uruguay
Avilés 28'; Aguinaga 87'		Kanapkis 64'

Estadio Olímpico Atahualpa, Quito
Attendance: 45,000
Referee: Francisco Lamolina (Argentina)

===== Round of 16 =====
Ecuador was paired against Paraguay, Group B third-place finisher, in the Round of 16. They continued their winning ways and advanced to the semifinals.

26 June 1993

Ecuador	3 – 0	Paraguay
E. Hurtado 33'; Ramírez 43' (o.g.); Avilés 81'

Estadio Olímpico Atahualpa, Quito
Attendance: 45,000
Referee: Márcio Rezende (Brazil)

===== Semifinal =====
Ecuador semifinal match was against Mexico, one of the tournament's two invitees. They lost their first game of the tournament.

30 June 1993

Mexico	2 – 0	Ecuador
Sánchez 23'; R. Ramírez 54'

Estadio Olímpico Atahualpa, Quito
Attendance: 45,000
Referee: Alberto Tejada (Peru)

===== Third-place match =====
Ecuador played the third-place match against Colombia, the loser of close game to eventual champion Argentina. They again would lose for the second straight match.

3 July 1993

Colombia	1 – 0	Ecuador
Valencia 86'

Estadio Reales Tamarindos, Portoviejo
Attendance: 18,000
Referee: Alvaro Arboleda (Venezuela)

Ecuador finished in fourth place. This matched their best results they had achieved in the continental tournament in 1959 (in which they also played host). Despite the fourth-place result, they were the most effective team of the tournament with a 66.7% efficacy rating, scoring the most goals (13), having the best goal difference (+8), and having the most wins (4).

Team	Pld	W	D	L	GF	GA	GD	Pts.	Eff
Ecuador	6	4	0	2	13	5	+8	8	66.7%

==== Friendlies ====
27 January 1993

Ecuador	1 – 1	Belarus
Fernández 36'		Hyerasimets 69'

Estadio Monumental Isidro Romero Carbo, Guayaquil
Attendance: 38,000
Referee: Elías Jácome (Ecuador)

31 January 1993

Ecuador	3 – 0	Romania
E. Hurtado 32'; Gavica 43'; Avilés 60'

Estadio Monumental Isidro Romero Carbo, Guayaquil
Attendance: 10,000
Referee: Medardo Ángel Martínez (Ecuador)

30 May 1993

Ecuador	1 – 0	Peru
Fernández 24'

Estadio Olímpico Atahualpa, Quito
Attendance: 24,000
Referee: Marco Aguas (Ecuador)

Note: Not an official international.

9 June 1993

Ecuador	1 – 2	Chile
Avilés 29'		Pizarro 23'; Barrera 25'

Estadio Olímpico Atahualpa, Quito
Attendance: 45,000
Referee: Carpio Guevara (Ecuador)
