= 1991 in Ecuadorian football =

Football in Ecuador
- Season: 1991

The 1991 season is the 69th season of competitive football in Ecuador.

== National leagues ==
=== Serie A ===
- Champion: Barcelona (11th title)
- International cup qualifiers:
  - 1992 Copa Libertadores: Barcelona, Valdez
  - 1992 Copa CONMEBOL: El Nacional
- Relegated: Macará (after the first stage); Juvenil (after the second stage)

=== Serie B ===
- Winner:
  - First Stage: Green Cross (1st title)
  - Second Stage: Aucas (2nd title)
- Promoted: Green Cross (after the first stage); Aucas (after the second stage)
- Relegated: Audaz Octubrino, Deportivo Quevedo

=== Segunda ===
- Winner: 2 de Marzo (1st title)
- Promoted: 2 de Marzo, Santos

== National team ==
=== Senior team ===
The Ecuador national team played eight matches in 1991: four at the Copa America, and four friendlies.

==== Copa América ====
Ecuador played in 1991 Copa America held in Chile. For the Group Stage, they were drawn into Group B with Brazil, Uruguay, Colombia, and Bolivia. They finished 4th in the group and didn't advance to the Final Round.

Team	Pld	W	D	L	GF	GA	GD	Pts
Colombia	4	2	1	1	3	1	+2	5
Brazil	4	2	1	1	6	5	+1	5
Uruguay	4	1	3	0	4	3	+1	5
Ecuador	4	1	1	2	6	5	+1	3
Bolivia	4	0	2	2	2	7	−5	2

7 July 1991

Colombia	1 – 0	Ecuador
de Ávila 25'

Estadio Playa Ancha, Valparaíso
Attendance: 13,828
Referee: Juan Francisco Escobar (Paraguay)

9 July 1991

Uruguay	1 – 1	Ecuador
Méndez 49' (pen.)		Aguinaga 44'

Estadio Sausalito, Viña del Mar
Attendance: 18,430
Referee: Gastón Castro (Chile)

13 July 1991

Ecuador	4 – 0	Bolivia
Aguinaga 32'; Avilés 42', 73'; Ramírez 80' (pen.)

Estadio Sausalito, Viña del Mar
Attendance: 17,250
Referee: Gastón Castro (Chile)

15 July 1991

Brazil	3 – 1	Ecuador
Mazinho 8'; Márcio Santos 54'; Luis Henrique 89'		Muñoz 12'

Estadio Sausalito, Viña del Mar
Attendance: 19,000
Referee: Juan Francisco Escobar (Paraguay)

==== Friendlies ====
6 June 1991

Peru	0 – 1	Ecuador
		Ron 50'

Estadio Nacional, Lima
Attendance: 10,000
Referee: Fernando Chappell (Peru)

19 June 1991

Ecuador	2 – 1	Chile
Garay 7'; Guerrero 70'		Vera 10' (pen.)

Estadio Modelo, Guayaquil
Attendance: 35,000
Referee: Luis Naranjo (Ecuador)

25 June 1991

Ecuador	2 – 2	Peru
Carcelén; Muñoz		Hirano; Rodríguez

Estadio Modelo, Guayaquil
Attendance: 10,000

30 June 1991

Chile	3 – 1	Ecuador
Rubio 17', 41'; Zamorano 36'		Aguinaga 49'

Estadio Nacional, Santiago
Attendance: 25,000
Referee: Carlos Robles (Chile)

== Births ==
- January 27 - Juan Govea, footballer
