= 1996 in Ecuadorian football =

Football in Ecuador
- Season: 1996

The 1996 season is the 74th season of competitive football in Ecuador.

== National leagues ==
=== Serie A ===
- Champion: El Nacional (11th title)
- International cup qualifiers:
  - 1997 Copa Libertadores: El Nacional, Emelec
  - 1997 Copa CONMEBOL: Técnico Universitario
- Relegated: Green Cross, LDU Portoviejo

=== Serie B ===
- Winner: Deportivo Quevedo (2nd title)
- Promoted: Deportivo Quevedo, Calvi
- Relegated: LDU Loja, Imbabura

=== Segunda ===
- Winner: Macará
- Promoted: Macará, Esmeraldas Petrolero

== Clubs in international competitions ==
Team	1996 Copa Libertadores	1996 Copa CONMEBOL
Barcelona	Eliminated in the Quarterfinals	N/A
Emelec	N/A	Eliminated in the Second Round
ESPOLI	Eliminated in the Round of 16	N/A

== National teams ==
=== Senior team ===
The Ecuador national team played seventeen matches in 1996: six 1998 FIFA World Cup qualifiers and eleven friendlies.

==== 1998 FIFA World Cup qualifiers ====
Qualification to the 1998 FIFA World Cup in France began in 1996.

24 April 1996

Ecuador	4 – 1	Peru
E. Hurtado 54', 88'; M. Tenorio 65'; Gavica 78'		Palacios 62'

Estadio Monumental Isidro Romero Carbo, Guayaquil
Attendance: 60,000
Referee: Julio Alcide Matto (Uruguay)

2 June 1996

Ecuador	2 – 0	Argentina
Montaño 51'; E. Hurtado 90'

Estadio Olímpico Atahualpa, Quito
Attendance: 41,500
Referee: Armando Pérez Hoyos (Colombia)

6 July 1996

Chile	4 – 1	Ecuador
Zamorano 25', 86'; Salas 75'; Estay 83'		Aguinaga 73'

Estadio Nacional, Santiago
Attendance: 41,500
Referee: Pablo Peña (Bolivia)

1 September 1996

Ecuador	1 – 0	Venezuela
Aguinaga 5'

Estadio Olímpico Atahualpa, Quito
Attendance: 36,889
Referee: Carlos Robles (Chile)

9 October 1996

Ecuador	0 – 1	Colombia
		Asprilla 72'

Estadio Olímpico Atahualpa, Quito
Attendance: 45,000
Referee: Horacio Elizondo (Argentina)

10 November 1996

Paraguay	1 – 0	Ecuador
Benítez 23'

Estadio Defensores del Chaco, Asunción
Attendance: 40,000
Referee: Daniel Giménez (Argentina)

==== Friendlies ====
2 February 1996

Venezuela	0 – 1	Ecuador
		Fernández 80'

Estadio Brígido Iriarte, Caracas
Attendance: 6,000
Referee: Lenín Rodríguez (Venezuela)

11 February 1996

Lebanon	1 – 0	Ecuador
Ghazarian 14'

Beirut Municipal Stadium, Beirut
Attendance: 6,000
Referee: Ahmad Nabil Ayad (Lebanon)

16 February 1996

Oman	0 – 2	Ecuador
		E. Hurtado 55'; Fernández 70'

King Fahd Stadium, Riyadh
Attendance: 1,000
Referee: Ali Khalifi (Qatar)

18 February 1996

Qatar	1 – 1	Ecuador
Hassan 90'		E. Hurtado 3'

Jassim Bin Hamad Stadium, Doha
Attendance: 1,000
Referee: Jassen Al-Kari (Saudi Arabia)

23 February 1996

Kuwait	0 – 3	Ecuador
		M. Tenorio 5'; E. Hurtado 70'; Batallas 80'

Kuwait National Stadium, Kuwait City
Attendance: 1,000
Referee: Hassan Johar (Saudi Arabia)

25 February 1996

Qatar	1 – 2	Ecuador
Al-Obaidly 15'		E. Hurtado 46'; Fernández 73'

Jassim Bin Hamad Stadium, Doha
Attendance: 1,000
Referee: Juma Al-Kari (Oman)

6 March 1996

Japan	0 – 1	Ecuador
		E. Hurtado 46'

Nagaragawa Stadium, Gifu

Note: This is not an official international friendly.

30 June 1996

Ecuador	3 – 0	Armenia
Simoes de Souza 23'; Fernández 48'; Gavica 75'

Estadio Reales Tamarindos, Portoviejo
Attendance: 12,000
Referee: Roger Zambrano (Ecuador)

17 August 1996

Ecuador	1 – 1	Costa Rica
Fernández 18'		Solano 65'

Estadio Alejandro Serrano Aguilar, Cuenca
Attendance: 6,000
Referee: Jorge Orellana (Ecuador)

4 October 1996

Ecuador	2 – 1	Jamaica
Delgado 19', 90+2'		Lowe 43'

Estadio Bellavista, Ambato
Attendance: 18,000
Referee: Mauricio Reinoso (Ecuador)

23 October 1996

Ecuador	1 – 0	Mexico
Carabalí 60'

Oakland–Alameda County Coliseum, Oakland
Attendance: 27,528
Referee: Brian Hall (United States)
