= 1992 in Ecuadorian football =

Football in Ecuador
- Season: 1992

The 1992 season is the 70th season of competitive football in Ecuador.

== National leagues ==
=== Serie A ===
- Champion: El Nacional (10th title)
- International cup qualifiers:
  - 1993 Copa Libertadores: El Nacional, Barcelona
  - 1993 Copa CONMEBOL: Emelec
- Relegated: Universidad Católica (after the first stage); LDU Portoviejo (after the second stage)

=== Serie B ===
- Winner:
  - First Stage: LDU Portoviejo (4th title)
  - Second Stage: Santos (1st title)
- Promoted: LDU Portoviejo (after the first stage); Santos (after the second stage)
- Relegated: Juvenil, Macará

=== Segunda ===
- Winner: Audaz Octubrino (1st title)
- Promoted: Audaz Octubrino, 9 de Octubre

== National team ==
=== Senior team ===
The Ecuador national team played five friendlies in 1992.

24 May 1992

Guatemala	1 – 1	Ecuador
Westphal 31'		I. Hurtado 43'

Estadio Mateo Flores, Guatemala City
Attendance: 15,000
Referee: Fredy Burgos (Guatemala)

27 May 1992

Costa Rica	2 – 1	Ecuador
Arnáez 38'; Montero 44'		Carabalí 89'

Estadio Ricardo Saprissa, San José
Attendance: 15,000
Referee: Ramón Luis Méndez (Costa Rica)

4 July 1992

Uruguay	3 – 1	Ecuador
Kanapkis 8'; Paz 56'; Zalazar 58'		Fernández 83'

Estadio Centenario, Montevideo
Attendance: 15,000
Referee: Juan Carlos Crespi (Argentina)

6 August 1992

Ecuador	1 – 1	Costa Rica
Tenorio 65'		Jara 19'

Estadio Monumental Isidro Romero Carbo, Guayaquil
Attendance: 8,000
Referee: Elias Jácome (Ecuador)

Note: This is an unofficial friendly.

24 November 1992

Peru	1 – 1	Ecuador
Ramírez 49'		Zambrano 4'

Estadio Nacional, Lima
Attendance: 7,000
Referee: José Arana (Peru)
