= 1995 Liga Deportiva Universitaria de Quito season =

LDU Quito
1995 season
- President: Darío Ávila
- Manager: Carlos Sevilla
- Stadium: Estadio Olímpico Atahualpa
- Serie A: 5th
- Top goalscorer: Patricio Hurtado (17 goals)
Home colours	Away colours

Liga Deportiva Universitaria de Quito's 1995 season was the club's 65th year of existence, the 42nd year in professional football, and the 35th in the top level of professional football in Ecuador.

== Kits ==
Supplier: Marathon
Sponsor(s): Pinturas Wesco, MasterCard, SAETA

== Squad ==
No.	Pos.	Nation	Player
—	GK	ECU	Marcelo Capirossi
—	GK	ECU	Rolando Guerrero
—	GK	ECU	Francisco Reinoso
—	DF	BRA	Edison Barbosa
—	DF	ECU	Santiago Jácome
—	DF	CHI	Adolfo Ovalle
—	DF	ECU	Danilo Samaniego
—	DF	ECU	Eduardo Zambrano
—	MF	PAR	Néstor Benítez
—	MF	ECU	Robert Burbano
—	MF	ARG	Roberto Cerino
—	MF	BRA	Luis Claudio de Almeida
—	MF	ECU	Luis Escalante
—	MF	BRA	Fabio Henrique Fernandes

No.	Pos.	Nation	Player
—	MF	ECU	Juan Carlos Garay
—	MF	ECU	Luis González
—	MF	ECU	Juan Guamán (captain)
—	MF	ECU	Paúl Guevara
—	MF	ECU	Pietro Marsetti
—	MF	ECU	Miguel Mina
—	MF	ARG	Gerardo Reinoso
—	MF	ECU	Hjalmar Zambrano
—	FW	ECU	Diego Herrera
—	FW	ECU	Patricio Hurtado
—	FW	ECU	Lino Sánchez
—	FW	CHI	Rolando Santelices
—	FW	ECU	Patricio Vargas
—	FW	ECU	Leonel Yerovi
—	FW	ECU	Diego Escandón

== Competitions ==
=== Serie A ===
==== First stage ====
===== First phase =====
Pos	Team	Pld	W	D	L	GF	GA	GD	Pts	Qualification
1	ESPOLI	22	15	3	4	37	21	+16	48	Qualified to the Liguilla Pre Libertadores
2	LDU Quito	22	14	5	3	45	16	+29	47	Qualified to the Liguilla Pre Libertadores
3	Barcelona	22	12	7	3	45	15	+30	43	Qualified to the Liguilla Pre Libertadores
4	Green Cross	22	13	3	6	32	23	+9	42	Qualified to the Liguilla Pre Libertadores
5	Emelec	22	11	7	4	38	24	+14	40	
6	Aucas	22	8	8	6	29	24	+5	32	
7	Deportivo Quito	22	7	4	11	26	30	−4	25	
8	L.D.U. Portoviejo	22	7	4	11	27	34	−7	25	
9	El Nacional	22	5	8	9	30	26	+4	23	
10	Olmedo	22	4	6	12	22	43	−21	18	
11	Delfín	22	5	1	16	26	67	−41	16	
12	9 de Octubre	22	2	2	18	17	51	−34	8	

====== Results ======
Home \ Away	SDA	BSC	DSC	SDQ	EN	CSE	CDE	GC	LDP	LDU	CDO	9DO
Aucas										1–2		
Barcelona										0–2		
Delfín										1–4		
Deportivo Quito										0–1		
El Nacional										2–1		
Emelec										3–2		
ESPOLI										1–2		
Green Cross										0–1		
L.D.U. Portoviejo										1–1		
LDU Quito	1–1	1–1	8–2	1–0	0–0	5–1	0–0	2–0	2–0		5–0	3–1
Olmedo										1–0		
9 de Octubre										0–1		

Source: RSSSF
Legend: Blue = home team win; Yellow = draw; Red = away team win.

===== Liguilla Pre Libertadores =====
Pos	Team	Pld	W	D	L	GF	GA	GD	Pts	Qualification
1	Barcelona	6	5	1	0	16	2	+14	16	Finals and Qualified to the 1996 Copa Libertadores
2	ESPOLI	6	2	1	3	6	9	−3	7	
3	Green Cross	6	2	1	3	4	13	−9	7	
4	LDU Quito	6	1	1	4	7	9	−2	4	

====== Results ======
Home \ Away	BSC	CDE	GC	LDU
Barcelona				2–0
ESPOLI				1–0
Green Cross				1–0
LDU Quito	2–4	1–1	4–0	

Source: RSSSF
Legend: Blue = home team win; Yellow = draw; Red = away team win.

==== Second stage ====
Group 1

Pos	Team	Pld	W	D	L	GF	GA	GD	Pts	Qualification
1	Barcelona	10	5	3	2	18	7	+11	18	Qualified to the Liguilla Final
2	LDU Quito	10	5	3	2	20	13	+7	18	Qualified to the Liguilla Final
3	El Nacional	10	5	3	2	10	8	+2	18	Qualified to the Liguilla Final
4	Green Cross	10	3	6	1	11	9	+2	15	
5	Deportivo Quito	10	2	2	6	6	11	−5	8	
6	Delfín	10	1	1	8	3	20	−17	4	

===== Results =====
Home \ Away	BSC	DSC	SDQ	EN	GC	LDU
Barcelona						5–2
Delfín						1–4
Deportivo Quito						1–2
El Nacional						2–1
Green Cross						2–2
LDU Quito	1–0	5–0	1–0	1–1	1–1	

Source: RSSSF
Legend: Blue = home team win; Yellow = draw; Red = away team win.

==== Liguilla Final ====
Pos	Team	Pld	W	D	L	GF	GA	GD	Pts	Qualification
1	ESPOLI	10	6	3	1	12	6	+6	21	Finals and Qualified to the 1996 Copa Libertadores
2	Barcelona	10	5	3	2	16	8	+8	18	
3	El Nacional	10	4	3	3	12	12	0	15	
4	Emelec	10	4	2	4	15	15	0	14	
5	LDU Quito	10	3	2	5	9	12	−3	11	
6	Aucas	10	1	1	8	6	17	−11	4	

===== Results =====
Home \ Away	SDA	BSC	EN	CSE	CDE	LDU
Aucas						0–2
Barcelona						1–0
El Nacional						1–1
Emelec						2–0
ESPOLI						1–0
LDU Quito	2–1	1–2	0–0	2–1	1–3	

Source: RSSSF
Legend: Blue = home team win; Yellow = draw; Red = away team win.
