= 1991 Liga Deportiva Universitaria de Quito season =

L.D.U. Quito
1991 season
- President: Raúl Vaca
- Manager: Polo Carrera
- Stadium: Estadio Olímpico Atahualpa
- Serie A: 5th
- Copa Libertadores: Round of 16
- Top goalscorer: League: Carlos Berrueta (13 goals); All: Carlos Berrueta (16 goals)
Home colours	Away colours

Liga Deportiva Universitaria de Quito's 1991 season was the club's 61st year of existence, the 38th year in professional football, and the 31st in the top level of professional football in Ecuador.

== Kits ==
Sponsor(s): Philips

== Squad ==
No.	Pos.	Nation	Player
—	GK	ECU	Patricio Gallardo
—	GK	ECU	Liborio Hurtado
—	GK	ECU	Víctor Sánchez
—	DF	ECU	Édison Arias
—	DF	ARG	Ricardo Iribarren
—	DF	ECU	Rodney Mantilla
—	DF	ECU	César Mina
—	DF	ECU	Janz Ortega
—	DF	ECU	Danilo Ríos
—	DF	ECU	Danilo Samaniego
—	DF	ECU	Eduardo Zambrano
—	MF	URU	Carlos Berrueta

No.	Pos.	Nation	Player
—	MF	ECU	Paúl Carrera
—	MF	ECU	Hernán Castillo
—	MF	ECU	Juan Guamán
—	MF	ECU	Pietro Marsetti (captain)
—	MF	ECU	Carlos Páez
—	MF	ECU	Luis Pozo
—	MF	URU	Luis Alberto Acosta
—	FW	ECU	Mauricio Argüello
—	FW	ECU	Nelson Guerrero
—	FW	ARG	Marcelo Gutiérrez
—	FW	ECU	Diego Herrera
—	FW	ECU	Pedro Salvador

== Competitions ==
=== Serie A ===
==== First stage ====
Pos	Team	Pld	W	D	L	GF	GA	GD	Pts	Qualification or relegation
1	Barcelona	22	14	5	3	43	21	+22	33	Qualified to the Third Stage
2	El Nacional	22	9	11	2	37	20	+17	29	Qualified to the Third Stage
3	L.D.U. Quito	22	10	7	5	45	26	+19	27	Qualified to the Third Stage
4	Valdez	22	9	9	4	31	17	+14	27	Qualified to the Third Stage
5	Emelec	22	7	9	6	30	36	−6	23	
6	Deportivo Quito	22	6	9	7	32	31	+1	21	
7	Técnico Universitario	22	8	5	9	30	30	0	21	
8	Universidad Católica	22	6	7	9	20	24	−4	19	
9	Deportivo Cuenca	22	7	5	10	23	28	−5	19	
10	Juvenil	22	5	8	9	20	39	−19	18	
11	Delfín	22	5	4	13	27	45	−18	14	
12	Macará	22	3	7	12	20	41	−21	13	Relegated to the Serie B

===== Results =====
Home \ Away	BSC	DSC	CDC	SDQ	EN	CSE	CDJ	LDQ	MAC	TU	UC	VSC
Barcelona								1–4				
Delfín								2–1				
Deportivo Cuenca								1–3				
Deportivo Quito								1–3				
El Nacional								1–0				
Emelec								4–1				
Juvenil								1–1				
L.D.U. Quito	2–1	5–0	0–0	2–2	2–3	5–0	6–0		1–0	2–0	2–1	0–0
Macará								1–1				
Técnico Universitario								4–1				
Universidad Católica								1–1				
Valdez								1–1				

Source: RSSSF
Legend: Blue = home team win; Yellow = draw; Red = away team win.

==== Second stage ====
Group 1

Pos	Team	Pld	W	D	L	GF	GA	GD	Pts	Qualification
1	Barcelona	10	5	4	1	20	10	+10	14	Qualified to the Third Stage
2	Emelec	10	5	3	2	17	10	+7	13	Qualified to the Third Stage
3	Deportivo Cuenca	10	4	2	4	13	12	+1	10	
4	Delfín	10	4	2	4	13	15	−2	10	
5	L.D.U. Quito	10	3	3	4	14	13	+1	9	
6	Universidad Católica	10	1	2	7	12	29	−17	4	

===== Results =====
Home \ Away	BSC	DSC	CDC	CSE	LDQ	UC
Barcelona					2–0	
Delfín					0–1	
Deportivo Cuenca					1–2	
Emelec					3–1	
L.D.U. Quito	1–1	6–0	0–2	1–2		0–0
Universidad Católica					2–2	

Source: RSSSF
Legend: Blue = home team win; Yellow = draw; Red = away team win.

==== Third stage ====
Group 2

Pos	Team	Pld	W	D	L	GF	GA	GD	Pts	Qualification
1	El Nacional	6	2	2	2	5	3	+2	7.5	Qualified to the Liguilla Final
2	Deportivo Quito	6	3	1	2	9	11	−2	7	Qualified to the Liguilla Final
3	L.D.U. Quito	6	2	2	2	9	7.5	+1.5	6	
4	Emelec	6	2	1	3	8	10.5	−2.5	5	

Note: Includes Bonus Points earned from the previous rounds: El Nacional (1.5); Emelec & LDU QUito (0.5)

===== Results =====
Home \ Away	SDQ	EN	CSE	LDQ
Deportivo Quito				3–2
El Nacional				0–0
Emelec				3–1
L.D.U. Quito	2–0	1–1	3–0	

Source: RSSSF
Legend: Blue = home team win; Yellow = draw; Red = away team win.

=== Copa Libertadores ===
Overall								Home						Away					
Pld	W	D	L	GF	GA	GD	Pts	W	D	L	GF	GA	GD	W	D	L	GF	GA	GD
8	2	3	3	7	10	−3	9	1	3	0	6	2	+4	1	0	3	1	8	−7

==== First stage ====
Group 2 standings
Pos	Team	Pld	W	D	L	GF	GA	GD	Pts	Qualification	(Chile) CC	(Ecuador) LDQ	(Chile) CON	(Ecuador) BSC
1	(Chile) Colo-Colo	6	3	3	0	10	3	+7	9	Round of 16	—	3–0	2–0	3–1
2	(Ecuador) LDU Quito	6	2	2	2	5	6	−1	6	Round of 16	0–0	—	4–0	0–0
3	(Chile) Deportes Concepción	6	2	2	2	6	8	−2	6	Round of 16	0–0	3–0	—	1–0
4	(Ecuador) Barcelona	6	0	3	3	5	9	−4	3		2–2	0–1	2–2	—

Legend: Blue = home team win; Yellow = draw; Red = away team win.

February 20 First Stage	Barcelona (Ecuador)	0–1	(Ecuador) L.D.U. Quito	Guayaquil, Ecuador
		Report	Marsetti 88'	Stadium: Estadio Monumental Isidro Romero Carbo; Referee: Armando Pérez (Colombia)

March 8 First Stage	L.D.U. Quito (Ecuador)	4–0	(Chile) Deportes Concepción	Quito, Ecuador
	Marsetti 12', 27'; Berrueta 16', 42'	Report		Stadium: Estadio Olímpico Atahualpa; Referee: Francisco Lamolina (Argentina)

March 13 First Stage	L.D.U. Quito (Ecuador)	0–0	(Ecuador) Barcelona	Quito, Ecuador
		Report		Stadium: Estadio Olímpico Atahualpa; Referee: René Ortubé (Bolivia)

March 19 First Stage	Deportes Concepción (Chile)	3–0	(Ecuador) L.D.U. Quito	Concepción, Chile
	Correa 28'; Pérez 43'; Adomaitis 74'	Report		Stadium: Estadio Municipal de Concepción; Referee: Armando Pérez (Colombia)

March 22 First Stage	Colo-Colo (Chile)	3–0	(Ecuador) L.D.U. Quito	Santiago, Chile
	Dabrowski 1', 23'; Mendoza 15'	Report		Stadium: Estadio Monumental David Arellano; Referee: José Torres Cadena (Colombia)

April 5 First Stage	L.D.U. Quito (Ecuador)	0–0	(Chile) Colo-Colo	Quito, Ecuador
		Report		Stadium: Estadio Olímpico Atahualpa; Referee: Jorge Nieves (Uruguay)

==== Round of 16 ====
Team	Pld	W	D	L	GF	GA	GD	Pts	Qualification
(Colombia) Atlético Nacional	2	1	1	0	4	2	+2	3	Qualified to the Quarterfinals
(Ecuador) L.D.U. Quito	2	0	1	1	2	4	−2	1	

April 17 Round of 16	L.D.U. Quito (Ecuador)	2–2	(Colombia) Atlético Nacional	Quito, Ecuador
	Berrueta 17'; Herrera 62'	Report	Cañas 9'; Serna 89'	Stadium: Estadio Olímpico Atahualpa; Referee: Alberto Tejada (Peru)

April 25 Round of 16	Atlético Nacional (Colombia)	2–0	(Ecuador) L.D.U. Quito	San Cristóbal, Venezuela
	Cañas 38'; Pérez 60'	Report		Stadium: Estadio Polideportivo de Pueblo Nuevo; Referee: Francisco Farías (Venezuela)
