= List of Ecuador international footballers born outside Ecuador =

This is a list of football players who have represented the Ecuador national football team in international football since 1926 and were born outside Ecuador.

== List of Players ==
The following players:

1. have played at least one game for the full (senior male) Ecuador national team since 1926; and
2. were born outside Ecuador.

This list includes players who have dual citizenship with Ecuador and/or have become naturalised Ecuadorian citizens. The players are ordered per modern-day country of birth.

List of players
Country of birth	Player	Caps	Goals	Period
Argentina	Norberto Araujo	3	0	2011
Argentina	**Javier Burrai**	1	0	2024
Argentina	**Damián Díaz**	4	0	2021
Argentina	Esteban Dreer	12	0	2015–2017
Argentina	Marcelo Elizaga	23	0	2007–2011
Argentina	**Hernán Galíndez**	41	0	2021–2026
Argentina	Christian Gómez	2	0	1975
Argentina	Ariel Graziani	37	15	1997–2000
Argentina	Carlos Juárez	5	0	2000
Argentina	Javier Klimowicz	2	0	2007
Argentina	Jorge Larraz	6	5	1957
Argentina	Pedro Latino	6	0	1984–1985
Argentina	Ángel Liciardi	9	7	1976–1977
Argentina	Matias Oyola	7	0	2016–2017
Argentina	Carlos Alberto Raffo	13	12	1959–1961
Brazil	Gilson de Souza	17	1	1996–1997
Brazil	Helinho	2+	0	1965–1967
Brazil	José Paes	12	0	1979–1981
Colombia	**Byron Castillo**	13	0	2021–2022
Germany	**John Yeboah**	30	3	2023–
Panama	José Luis Mendoza	11	1	1941–1947
Panama	Luis Antonio Mendoza	21	1	1941–1947
Spain	**Diego Almeida**	1	0	2021
Spain	**Jeremy Arévalo**	4	0	2025–
Spain	**Jeremy Sarmiento**	26	2	2021–
United States	Miguel Ibarra	4	0	2009
Uruguay	Marcelo Fleitas	5	0	2009–2010
Uruguay	Eduardo García	3	0	1976–1977
Uruguay	Juan Carlos Gómez	8	0	1976–1977

=== Players with only youth caps ===
- Malcom Dacosta (born in Alicante, Spain) (2026–)
- Luis Fragozo (born in Riohacha, Colombia) (2026–)

== See also ==
- List of Ecuador international footballers
