= José Gavica =

Ecuadorian footballer (born 1969)

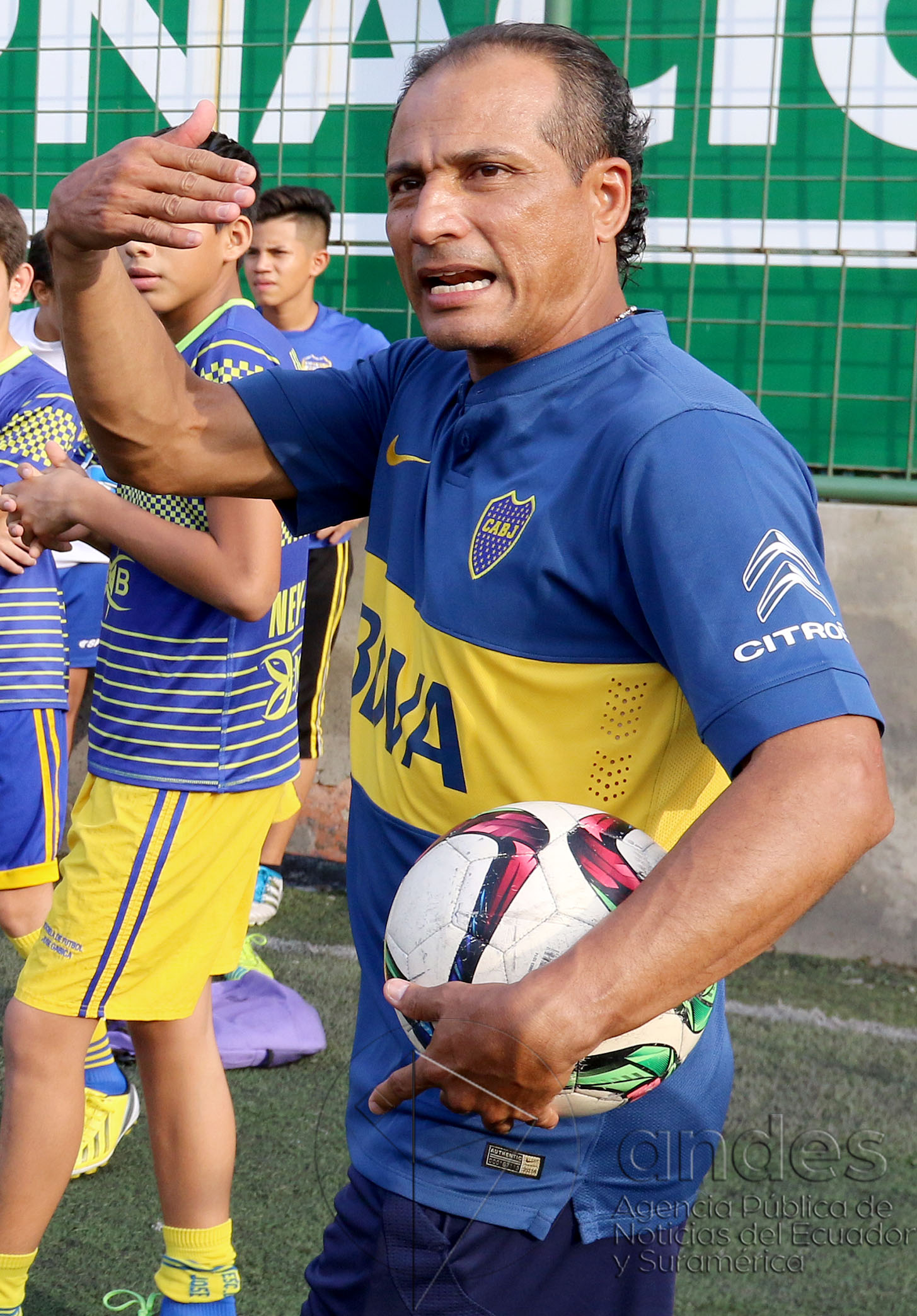
- Gavica in 2016

Personal information
- Full name: José Eduardo Gavica Peñafiel
- Date of birth: January 8, 1969 (age 57)
- Place of birth: Guayaquil, Ecuador
- Height: 1.68 m (5 ft 6 in)
- Position: Midfielder

Senior career*
Years	Team	Apps	(Gls)
1991–1997	Barcelona SC	202	(34)
1997	Audaz Octubrino		
1998	Everton		
1998–2001	Delfín	79	(29)
2002	El Nacional		
2003–2004	Barcelona SC	35	(8)
2005	El Nacional	39	(4)
2006	Macará	25	(1)

International career
1992–2003	Ecuador	34	(4)

Managerial career
- 2015: Guayas Province U15
- 2019: Barcelona SC (interim)
- * Club domestic league appearances and goals

José Eduardo Gavica (born 8 January 1969) is a retired Ecuadorian football midfielder.

== Club career ==
- (Ecuador) Barcelona 1991–1997
- (Ecuador) Audaz Octubrino 1997
- (Chile) Everton 1998
- (Ecuador) Delfín 1998–2001
- (Ecuador) El Nacional 2002
- (Ecuador) Barcelona 2003–2004
- (Ecuador) El Nacional 2005
- (Ecuador) Macará 2006

== International career ==
He was a member of the Ecuador national football team for eleven years, and obtained a total number of 34 caps during his career.

== Career statistics ==
=== International goals ===
#	Date	Venue	Opponent	Score	Result	Competition
1.	31 January 1993	Estadio Modelo Alberto Spencer, Guayaquil, Ecuador	Romania	1–1	Draw	Friendly
2.	24 April 1996	Estadio Monumental Isidro Romero Carbo, Guayaquil, Ecuador	Peru	4–1	Win	1998 World Cup qualification
3.	30 June 1996	Estadio Reales Tamarindos, Portoviejo, Ecuador	Armenia	3–0	Win	Friendly
4.	17 June 1997	Estadio Félix Capriles, Cochabamba, Bolivia	Chile	2–1	Win	1997 Copa América
Correct as of 7 October 2015
