= Rolando Santelices =

Chilean footballer

Personal information
- Full name: David Rolando Santelices Rodríguez
- Date of birth: 23 March 1971 (age 55)
- Place of birth: Viña del Mar, Chile
- Height: 1.79 m (5 ft 10 in)
- Position: Forward

Youth career
- Estudiante Independiente
- Everton

Senior career*
Years	Team	Apps	(Gls)
1991	Ñublense		(3)
1992–1993	Everton	11	(4)
1993	Palestino	19	(2)
1994	Everton	18	(5)
1995	LDU Quito	14	(8)
1995	Everton	12	(2)
1996	Deportes Melipilla	19	(3)
1999	Santiago Wanderers		(1)

Managerial career
- 2013: Provincial Marga Marga
- Everton (youth)
- 2014: Everton (assistant)
- * Club domestic league appearances and goals

David Rolando Santelices Rodríguez (born 23 March 1971), known as Rolando Santelices, is a Chilean football manager and former player who played as a forward. Santelices also played in Ecuador.

== Playing career ==
As a youth player, Santelices was with club Estudiante Independiente before joining the Everton de Viña del Mar youth system. After becoming a free agent, he began his professional career with Ñublense in the Chilean second level in 1991.

The next season, he returned to Everton, also playing for them in 1994 and 1995 in the Chilean top division.

In 1995 he moved to Ecuador and joined Liga de Quito recommended by Luis Santibáñez, who had coached him in Everton. In that club, he coincided with his compatriot Adolfo Ovalle and made fourteen appearances with eight goals.

In his homeland, he also played for Palestino and Deportes Melipilla.

His last club was Santiago Wanderers, the classic rival of Everton, in 1999, getting the promotion to the top division.

== Coaching career ==
As a football manager, he led Provincial Marga Marga in the Chilean Tercera B.

The next season, he worked for the Everton youth system and served as one of the four assistants of the interim coach, Carlos Medina.

He also owns a football academy based in Valparaíso Sporting Club.

== Personal life ==
His younger brother, Álex, also was a footballer who played for Everton and Santiago Wanderers.

Outside of football, he and his wife devote time in horseracing, a family passion from his grandfather of the same name, David.
