= Omar Cañas =

Colombian footballer (1969-1993)

Personal information
- Date of birth: 16 September 1969
- Place of birth: Medellín, Colombia
- Date of death: 3 February 1993 (aged 23)
- Place of death: Bello, Colombia
- Position: Midfielder

Senior career*
Years	Team	Apps	(Gls)
- Atlético Nacional

International career
- Colombia
- * Club domestic league appearances and goals

Omar Darío Cañas Espinosa (16 September 1969 – 3 February 1993) was a Colombian footballer who played as a midfielder. He competed in the men's tournament at the 1992 Summer Olympics.

== Death ==
Cañas, along with two others were shot and killed on 3 February 1993. He was 23 years old. The day the Colombia U-17 National Team was playing against Ecuador and “Toro” met with some friends to watch the game. They found him tied hand and foot and shot several times, along with a 17-year-old girl and a young man who was the brother of a hitman leader who had been murdered hours before.
