= Hamilton Cuvi =

Ecuadorian footballer (born 1960)

Personal information
- Full name: Hamilton Emilio Cuvi Rivera
- Date of birth: May 8, 1960 (age 66)
- Place of birth: Milagro, Ecuador
- Height: 1.80 m (5 ft 11 in)
- Position: Attacking midfielder

Senior career*
Years	Team	Apps	(Gls)
1980–1982	Audaz Octubrino		
1982–1985	9 De Octubre		
1985–1993	Filanbanco		
1993–1994	LDU Portoviejo		
1994–1995	Filanbanco		
1995–1996	Aucas		
1996–2003	Delfín		

International career
1983–1989	Ecuador	46	(6)
- * Club domestic league appearances and goals

Hamilton Emilio Cuvi Rivera (born May 8, 1960) is a retired footballer from Ecuador, who played as a midfielder during his career.

== Ecuador ==
- 1983-1989 Ecuador

=== Personal Titles ===
- Top Scorer with Filanbanco in 1987 (24 Goals) (Ecuador)
- Scorer with 147 Goals in Ecuadorian Serie A
