= José María Guerrero (footballer) =

Ecuadorian footballer (born 1967)

Personal information
- Date of birth: 7 April 1967 (age 59)
- Position: Midfielder

International career
Years	Team	Apps	(Gls)
1987–1995	Ecuador	11	(1)

José María Guerrero (born 7 April 1967) is an Ecuadorian former footballer. He played in eleven matches for the Ecuador national football team from 1987 to 1995. He was also part of Ecuador's squad for the 1991 Copa América tournament.
