= Orly Klínger =

Ecuadorian footballer (born 1956)

Personal information
- Date of birth: 10 October 1956 (age 70)
- Place of birth: Esmeraldas, Ecuador

International career
Years	Team	Apps	(Gls)
1981–1985	Ecuador	22	(0)

Orly Klínger (born 10 October 1956) is an Ecuadorian footballer. He played in 22 matches for the Ecuador national football team from 1981 to 1985. He was also part of Ecuador's squad for the 1983 Copa América tournament.
