= Hjalmar Zambrano =

Ecuadorian footballer (born 1971)

Personal information
- Full name: Hjalmar Alcharoy Zambrano Zambrano
- Date of birth: 23 April 1971 (age 55)
- Place of birth: Chone, Ecuador
- Position: Midfielder

Senior career*
| Years | Team | Apps | (Gls) |
| 1987–1990 | Filanbanco | 12 | (0) |
| 1991–1992 | Valdez | 46 | (11) |
| 1993 | Barcelona | 28 | (3) |
| 1994 | Deportivo Quito | 38 | (8) |
| 1995–1998 | LDU Quito | 52 | (4) |

International career
| 1992–1995 | Ecuador | 5 | (1) |
- * Club domestic league appearances and goals

Hjalmar Alcharoy Zambrano Zambrano (born 23 April 1971) is a retired Ecuadorian footballer (soccer), who played as a midfielder.

== International career ==
He was a member of the Ecuador national football team for three years, and obtained a total number of 5 caps during his career. He made his debut on 24 November 1992 in a friendly against Peru, scoring one goal, after having competed at the 1987 FIFA U-16 World Championship in Canada.

== Honours ==
=== International ===
- Ecuador
  - Korea Cup: 1995
