= Lupo Quiñónez =

Ecuadorian footballer (born 1957)

Personal information
- Full name: Lupo Quiñónez
- Place of birth: Muisne, Ecuador
- Height: 1.90 m (6 ft 3 in)
- Position: Forward

Senior career*
| Years | Team | Apps | (Gls) |
| 1975–1982 | Emelec | | |
| 1982–1983 | Manta | | |
| 1984–1988 | Barcelona | | |
| 1989–1990 | Deportivo Quito | | |
| 1989–1990 | Filanbanco | | |
| Total | | | (115) |
- * Club domestic league appearances and goals

Lupo Quiñónez (born February 12, 1957) is a retired footballer from Ecuador, who played as a forward during his career. Lupo Quiñónez was nicknamed El Tanque de Muisne, the Tank from Muisne. Lupo Quiñónez scored 115 goals in the Ecuadorian football league.

== Ecuador ==
- 1983-1989 Ecuador

== Club Titles ==
- Emelec Campeonato Ecuatoriano 1979
- Barcelona Campeonato Ecuatoriano 1985
- Barcelona Campeonato Ecuatoriano 1987

=== Personal Titles ===
- The top scorer in the derby Barcelona vs Emelec is Lupo Quiñónez with 13 (ten for Emelec and three for Barcelona) (Ecuador)
