= Jaime Baldeón =

Ecuadorian footballer (born 1959)

Personal information
- Date of birth: 25 February 1959 (age 67)
- Place of birth: Sangolquí, Ecuador

International career
Years	Team	Apps	(Gls)
1981–1987	Ecuador	21	(4)

Jaime Baldeón (born 25 February 1959) is an Ecuadorian footballer. He played in 21 matches for the Ecuador national football team from 1981 to 1987. He was also part of Ecuador's squad for the 1987 Copa América tournament.
