= Raúl Noriega =

Ecuadorian footballer (born 1970)

Personal information
- Full name: Raúl Alfredo Noriega Escobar
- Date of birth: 4 January 1970 (age 56)
- Place of birth: Guayaquil, Ecuador
- Height: 1.81 m (5 ft 11 in)
- Position: Central defender

Senior career*
Years	Team	Apps	(Gls)
1987–1993	Barcelona	92	(4)
1993–1994	Boca Juniors	24	(0)
1994–2002	Barcelona	237	(8)
2003–2004	Cúcuta Deportivo	82	(6)
2004–2007	Barcelona	45	(3)
2008–2009	Universidad Católica	-	

International career
1988–1997	Ecuador	27	(2)
- * Club domestic league appearances and goals

Raúl Alfredo Noriega Escobar (nicknamed "Pavo", born 4 January 1970 in Guayaquil) is a former Ecuadorian international football player who made 27 appearances for the Ecuador national team between 1988 and 1997. He played as a central defender.

== Club career ==
Noriego played the majority of his club career with Barcelona Sporting Club in Ecuador, but he did have short spells with Boca Juniors of Argentina and Cúcuta Deportivo of Colombia. On 24 January 2009, Noriega retired from professional football after a friendly match between Barcelona Sporting Club and Millonarios of Colombia.

== International career ==
International goals
#	Date	Venue	Opponent	Score	Result	Competition
1.	1993-06-15	Quito, Ecuador	Venezuela	6–1	Win	Copa América
2.	1993-09-19	Guayaquil, Ecuador	Bolivia	1–1	Draw	WCQ 1994

== Honours ==
- Ecuador
  - Korea Cup: 1995
