= Eduardo Hurtado =

Ecuadorian footballer (born 1969)

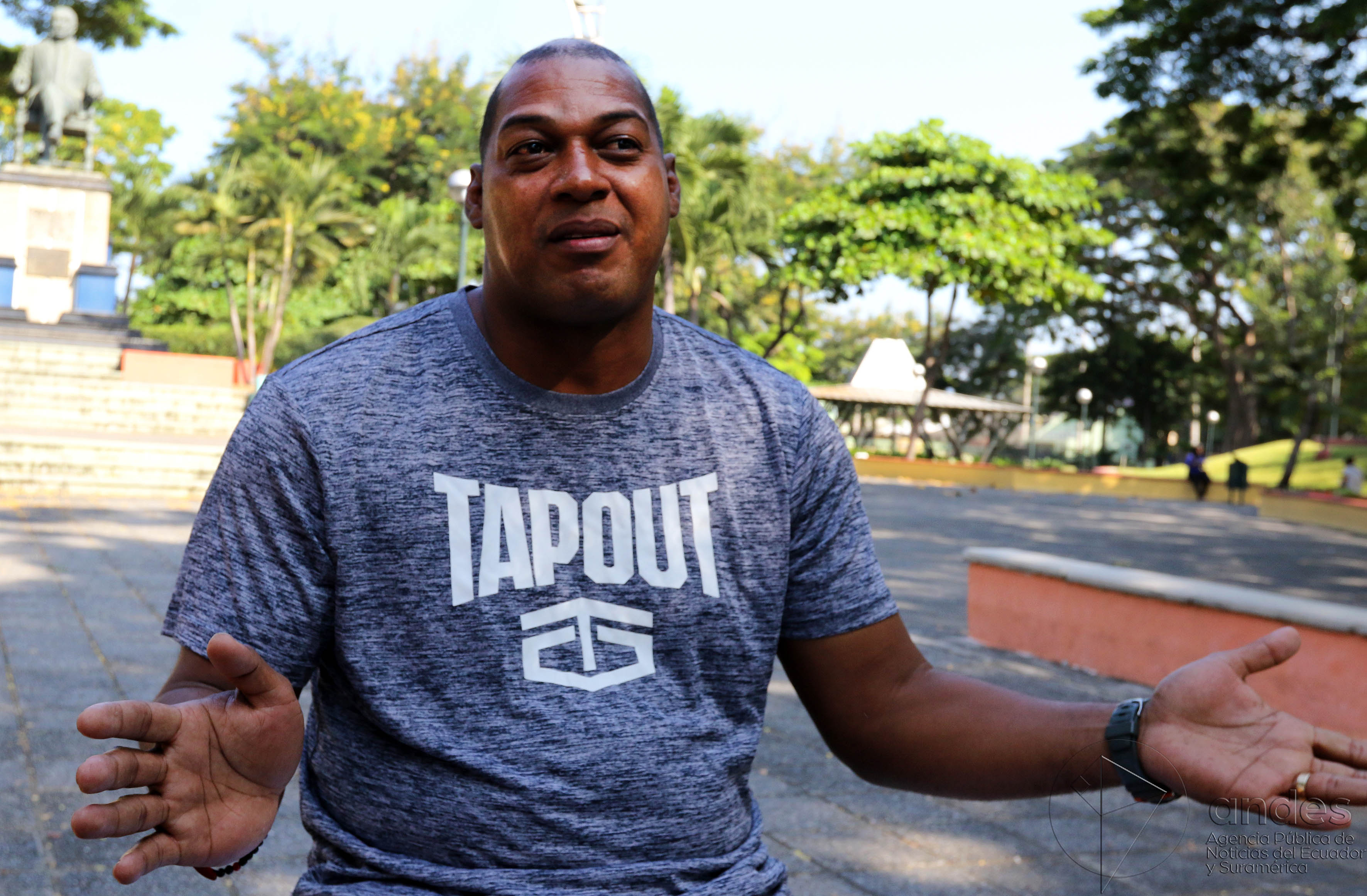
- Hurtado in 2016

Personal information
- Full name: Eduardo Estíguar Hurtado Roa
- Date of birth: 2 December 1969 (age 56)
- Place of birth: Esmeraldas, Ecuador
- Height: 1.90 m (6 ft 3 in)
- Position: Forward

Youth career
- 1986–1991: Centro Juvenil

Senior career*
Years	Team	Apps	(Gls)
1991–1992	Valdez	50	(18)
1993	St. Gallen	22	(7)
1993	Colo-Colo	11	(4)
1994	Correcaminos	14	(1)
1994	Emelec	61	(33)
1995–1998	Los Angeles Galaxy	50	(30)
1996	→ Barcelona S.C. (loan)	7	(2)
1997	→ L.D.U. Quito (loan)		
1998–1999	MetroStars	55	(17)
1998	→ L.D.U. Quito (loan)	11	(3)
1999	→ L.D.U. Quito (loan)	11	(3)
2000	New England Revolution	3	(0)
2000	L.D.U. Quito	20	(10)
2001	Argentinos Juniors	27	(7)
2001–2002	Hibernian	12	(1)
2002–2003	Barcelona S.C.	26	(8)
2003	El Nacional	6	(1)
2003	U. de Concepción	13	(6)
2004–2005	Audaz Octubrino	23	(19)
2005–2006	→ Olmedo (loan)	51	(13)
2006	→ Técnico Universitario (loan)	7	(5)
2006–2007	→ Norte America (loan)	20	(11)
2007	Deportivo Pereira	1	(0)
2008	San Camilo	8	(0)
2010	Patria	6	(0)
Total		515	(189)

International career
1992–2002	Ecuador	74	(26)
- * Club domestic league appearances and goals

Eduardo Estíguar Hurtado Roa (born 2 December 1969) is an Ecuadorian former professional footballer who played as a forward. He is the third all-time top goalscorer for the Ecuador national team with 26 goals in 74 caps. He played for clubs in Ecuador, Switzerland, Chile, Mexico, the United States, Argentina and Scotland. In 1996, the first season of Major League Soccer (MLS), he finished second in the league's scoring race and helped the Los Angeles Galaxy reach the MLS Cup final. He was active for nearly 20 years, retiring at 40 years old in 2010.

== Career ==
Hurtado, nicknamed El Tanque ("The Tank") for his height and aggressive playing style, played for clubs in several countries. His first clubs were the now-defunct Valdez Sporting Club of Milagro and Emelec of Guayaquil, in his native Ecuador. He also played in Switzerland, Chile, Mexico, the United States, Argentina and Scotland before returning to Ecuador.

=== Major League Soccer ===
In 1996, the first season of Major League Soccer (MLS), Hurtado scored 21 goals for the Los Angeles Galaxy, finishing second in the league's scoring race. He scored three goals in the playoffs as the Galaxy reached the MLS Cup final, which they lost, and was named to the MLS Best XI at the end of the season. After scoring eight goals in 1997, Hurtado was traded to the MetroStars two games into the 1998 season. He finished the year with 11 goals and 15 assists (10 and 14 of them for the MetroStars), plus a goal in the playoffs.

Hurtado scored two goals in the MetroStars' 1999 season opener and five more over the rest of the season. The MetroStars placed him on waivers after the season. The New England Revolution signed him, but released him after three games in which he did not score.

=== Post-MLS Career ===
After leaving MLS, Hurtado played for Liga Deportiva Universitaria, Argentinos Juniors and then Hibernian, where he joined his international teammate Ulises De La Cruz. He was signed by Alex McLeish, who soon left the club to join Rangers; Bobby Williamson later released him on a free transfer.

He then played for Barcelona S.C., El Nacional, Universidad de Concepción and Audaz Octubrino of Machala. In December 2004, he returned to the United States to play indoor soccer, signing with the Cleveland Force of the MISL. He was released less than a month later and returned to Ecuador to play for Olmedo. In 2006, he played for the second-division club C.S. Norte América.

He later announced that he would move to Colombia to join first-division club Deportivo Pereira. The Recordman said: "I feel like I'm 20 years old, I want to score in Colombia" in an interview with a local TV.

In 2008, he played for San Camilo of the Ecuadorian Second Division.

He played his final season, at the age of 40, with Club Sport Patria, also in the Second Division.

List of international goals scored by Eduardo Hurtado
No.	Date	Venue	Opponent	Score	Result	Competition	Ref.
1	31 January 1993	Estadio Modelo Alberto Spencer Herrera, Guayaquil, Ecuador	Romania	1–0	3–0	Friendly	
2	15 June 1993	Estadio Olímpico Atahualpa, Quito, Ecuador	Venezuela	4–0	6–1	1993 Copa América	
3	19 June 1993	Estadio Olímpico Atahualpa, Quito, Ecuador	United States	2–0	2–0	1993 Copa América	
4	25 June 1993	Estadio Olímpico Atahualpa, Quito, Ecuador	Paraguay	1–0	3–0	1993 Copa América	
5	8 August 1993	Estadio Olímpico Atahualpa, Quito, Ecuador	Venezuela	2–0	5–0	1994 World Cup qualification	
6	8 August 1993	Estadio Olímpico Atahualpa, Quito, Ecuador	Venezuela	3–0	5–0	1994 World Cup qualification	
7	8 August 1993	Estadio Olímpico Atahualpa, Quito, Ecuador	Venezuela	5–0	5–0	1994 World Cup qualification	
8	24 May 1995	Toyama Athletic Stadium, Toyama, Japan	Scotland	1–1	1–2	Friendly	
9	4 June 1995	Dongdaemun Stadium, Seoul, South Korea	Zambia	1–0	4–1	Friendly	
10	4 June 1995	Dongdaemun Stadium, Seoul, South Korea	Zambia	2–1	4–1	Friendly	
11	4 June 1995	Dongdaemun Stadium, Seoul, South Korea	Zambia	3–1	4–1	Friendly	
12	4 June 1995	Dongdaemun Stadium, Seoul, South Korea	Zambia	4–1	4–1	Friendly	
13	10 June 1995	Dongdaemun Stadium, Seoul, South Korea	Costa Rica	1–0	2–1	Friendly	
14	25 October 1995	Estadio Ramón Tahuichi Aguilera, Santa Cruz, Bolivia	Bolivia	2–2	2–2	Friendly	
15	16 February 1996	Riyadh, Saudi Arabia	Oman	2–0	2–0	Friendly	
16	18 February 1996	Jassim bin Hamad Stadium, Doha, Qatar	Qatar	1–0	1–1	Friendly	
17	23 February 1996	Kuwait City, Kuwait	Kuwait	2–0	3–0	Friendly	
18	25 February 1996	Jassim bin Hamad Stadium, Doha, Qatar	Qatar	1–0	2–1	Friendly	
19	24 April 1996	Estadio Monumental, Guayaquil, Ecuador	Peru	1–0	4–1	1998 FIFA World Cup qualification	
20	24 April 1996	Estadio Monumental, Guayaquil, Ecuador	Peru	4–1	4–1	1998 FIFA World Cup qualification	
21	2 June 1996	Estadio Olímpico Atahualpa, Quito, Ecuador	Argentina	2–0	2–0	1998 FIFA World Cup qualification	
22	10 February 1999	Estadio Nacional, Lima, Peru	Peru	1–1	2–1	Friendly	
23	10 February 1999	Estadio Nacional, Lima, Peru	Peru	2–1	2–1	Friendly	
24	8 March 2000	Estadio Rodrigo Paz Delgado, Quito, Ecuador	Honduras	1–0	1–3	Friendly	
25	29 June 2000	Estadio Olímpico Atahualpa, Quito, Ecuador	Peru	2–0	2–1	2002 FIFA World Cup qualification	

== Honors ==
Ecuador

- Canada Cup: 1999
- Korea Cup: 1995

Individual

- MLS All-Star: 1996
- MLS Best XI: 1996
