= Raúl Avilés =

Ecuadorian footballer (born 1964)

Personal information
- Full name: Ney Raúl Augusto Avilés Aguirre
- Date of birth: February 17, 1964 (age 62)
- Place of birth: Guayaquil, Ecuador
- Position: Striker

Senior career*
Years	Team	Apps	(Gls)
1985	9 de Octubre		
1986–1992	Emelec		
1992	Sporting Cristal	10	(1)
1993–1994	Barcelona		
1995	LDU Portoviejo		
1996–2000	Barcelona		
2001	Santa Rita		

International career
1987–1993	Ecuador	55	(16)
- * Club domestic league appearances and goals as of September 2008

Ney Raúl Augusto Avilés Aguirre (born February 17, 1964) is a retired Ecuadorian football striker. He played 55 times for the Ecuador national team, in the forward and center forward position, scoring 16 goals between 1987 and 1993.

He attended the Vicente Rocafuerte school where he was part of the students sports league.

Avilés started his career in 1985 with 9 de Octubre, he soon joined Club Sport Emelec where he was part of the championship winning team of 1988.

He joined rivals Barcelona Sporting Club in 1993, but missed out on their 1995 championship success as he spent that season with Liga de Portoviejo. He returned to Barcelona and in 1997 won his 2nd league championship he remained with the club until 2000.

He spent his last year playing for Santa Rita Vinces in the Ecuadorian 2nd division.

At international level Avilés, he is the seventh highest scoring player in the history of the Ecuador national team. He participated in four editions of the Copa América in 1987, 1989, 1991 and 1993

== Career statistics ==
=== International ===
Appearances and goals by national team and year
National team	Year	Apps	Goals
Ecuador	1987	9	1
Ecuador	1988	8	1
Ecuador	1989	14	7
Ecuador	1991	7	2
Ecuador	1992	3	0
Ecuador	1993	14	5
Total		55	16

Scores and results list Ecuador's goal tally first, score column indicates score after each Avilés goal.

List of international goals scored by Raúl Avilés
No.	Date	Venue	Opponent	Score	Result	Competition	Ref.
1	15 April 1987	Estadio Nacional del Perú, Lima, Peru	Peru	1–0	1–0	Friendly	
2	17 June 1988	Estadio Nacional Chelato Uclés, Tegucigalpa, Honduras	Honduras	1–0	1–0	Friendly	
3	29 January 1989	Estadio Monumental Isidro Romero Carbo, Guayaquil, Ecuador	Chile	1–0	1–0	Friendly	
4	13 April 1989	Estadio Monumental Isidro Romero Carbo, Guayaquil, Ecuador	Argentina	1–2	2–2	Friendly	
5	3 May 1989	Estadio Centenario, Montevideo, Uruguay	Uruguay	1–2	1–3	Friendly	
6	23 May 1989	Estadio Olímpico Atahualpa, Quito, Ecuador	Uruguay	1–0	1–1	Friendly	
7	10 July 1989	Estádio Serra Dourada, Goiânia, Brazil	Chile	1–2	1–2	1989 Copa América	
8	10 September 1989	Estadio Defensores del Chaco, Asunción, Paraguay	Paraguay	1–2	1–2	1990 FIFA World Cup qualification	
9	24 September 1989	Estadio Monumental Isidro Romero Carbo, Guayaquil, Ecuador	Paraguay	3–1	3–1	1990 FIFA World Cup qualification	
10	13 July 1991	Estadio Sausalito, Viña del Mar, Chile	Bolivia	2–0	4–0	1991 Copa América	
11	13 July 1991	Estadio Sausalito, Viña del Mar, Chile	Bolivia	3–0	4–0	1991 Copa América	
12	31 January 1993	Estadio Modelo Alberto Spencer Herrera, Guayaquil, Ecuador	Romania	3–0	3–0	Friendly	
13	9 June 1993	Estadio Olímpico Atahualpa, Quito, Ecuador	Chile	1–2	1–2	Friendly	
14	19 June 1993	Estadio Olímpico Atahualpa, Quito, Ecuador	United States	1–0	2–0	1993 Copa América	
15	22 June 1993	Estadio Olímpico Atahualpa, Quito, Ecuador	Uruguay	1–0	2–1	1993 Copa América	
16	26 June 1993	Estadio Olímpico Atahualpa, Quito, Ecuador	Paraguay	3–0	3–0	1993 Copa América	

== Honors ==
=== Club ===
- Emelec
  - Serie A de Ecuador: 1988
- Barcelona
  - Serie A de Ecuador: 1997
