= Ivo Ron =

Ecuadorian footballer (born 1967)

Personal information
- Full name: Ivo Norman Ron Viver
- Date of birth: January 16, 1967 (age 59)
- Place of birth: Guayaquil, Ecuador
- Position: Attacking midfielder

Senior career*
Years	Team	Apps	(Gls)
1981–1983	Autoridad Portuaria		
1983–1992	Emelec		
1993	Deportivo Quito		
1994–1997	Emelec		

International career
1991–1995	Ecuador	10	(3)
- * Club domestic league appearances and goals

Ivo Norman Ron Viver (born 16 January 1967) is a retired Ecuadorian football (soccer) attacking midfielder.

== International career ==
He was a member of the Ecuador national football team for four years, and obtained a total number of ten caps during his career, scoring three goals. He made his debut on 5 June 1991 against Peru.

== Honours ==
=== Club ===
- Club Sport Emelec
  - Serie A de Ecuador: 1988, 1994

=== Individual ===
- Club Sport Emelec
  - Serie A de Ecuador: Best Player 1994
