= Hans Maldonado =

Ecuadorian footballer (1956-1999)

Personal information
- Date of birth: 25 June 1956
- Place of birth: Esmeraldas, Ecuador
- Date of death: 19 July 1999 (aged 43)

International career
| Years | Team | Apps | (Gls) |
| 1983–1985 | Ecuador | 20 | (4) |

Hans Maldonado (25 June 1956 – 19 July 1999) was an Ecuadorian footballer. He played in 20 matches for the Ecuador national football team from 1983 to 1985. He was also part of Ecuador's squad for the 1983 Copa América tournament.
