= Carlos Muñoz (Ecuadorian footballer) =

Ecuadorian footballer (1964–1993)

Personal information
- Full name: Carlos Antonio Muñoz Martínez
- Date of birth: 13 November 1964
- Place of birth: Machala, Ecuador
- Date of death: December 26, 1993 (aged 29)
- Position: Forward

Senior career*
Years	Team	Apps	(Gls)
1984	Everest		
1985	Olmedo		
1986	Audaz Octubrino		
1987–1989	Filanbanco		
1990–1993	Barcelona		(66)

International career
1987–1992	Ecuador	35	(4)
- * Club domestic league appearances and goals

Carlos Antonio Muñoz Martínez (13 November 1964 – 26 December 1993) was an Ecuadorian football forward, who was nicknamed "Frentón".

== Club career ==
Born in Machala, Muñoz started his career at Everest and played for Olmedo, Audaz Octubrino, Filanbanco and Barcelona.

== International career ==
Born in Guayaquil he was a member of the Ecuador national football team for four years, and obtained a total number of 35 caps during his career, scoring four goals. He made his debut on 15 March 1989 in a friendly against Brazil.

== Personal life and death ==
Muñoz died in a car accident on 26 December 1993. He was survived by his son Carlos Antonio Muñoz Vergara, daughter Maria Muñoz Vergara and wife Violeta Vergara.

== Honours ==
=== Club ===
- Barcelona Sporting Club
  - Serie A de Ecuador: 1991

=== Individual ===
- Barcelona Sporting Club
  - Serie A de Ecuador: Top scorer 1992
