= Juan Carlos Garay =

Ecuadorian footballer (born 1968)

Personal information
- Full name: Juan Carlos Garay Estrella
- Date of birth: September 15, 1968 (age 58)
- Place of birth: Ecuador
- Position: Midfielder

Senior career*
Years	Team	Apps	(Gls)
1986–1988	América de Quito		
1988	El Nacional		
1988	Olmedo		
1989–1994	El Nacional		
1995–1996	LDU Quito		
1997–2000	ESPOLI		
2000	Deportivo Saquisilí	14	(5)
2001	Macará	4	(0)
2001	Deportivo Saquisilí	28	(9)
2002	Universidad Católica	2	(0)
2002–2003	Aucas	54	(2)
2004	Técnico Universitario	8	(0)

International career^{‡}
1991–1996	Ecuador	28	(1)

Managerial career
- 2014: Deportivo Quito
- 2015: Pelileo SC
- 2016–2017: Clan Juvenil
- 2017: Mushuc Runa
- * Club domestic league appearances and goals as of 11 August 2007 ‡ National team caps and goals as of 4 July 2007

Juan Carlos Garay (born 1968-09-15) is a retired footballer from Ecuador, who played as a midfielder during his career.

== International career ==
He obtained a total number of 28 caps for the Ecuador national football team during the 1990s, scoring one goal.

== Nation ==
- Ecuador
  - Korea Cup: 1995
