= José Villafuerte =

Ecuadorian footballer (born 1956)

Personal information
- Full name: José Voltaire Villafuerte Tenorio
- Date of birth: 27 November 1956 (age 69)
- Place of birth: Esmeraldas, Ecuador
- Position: Midfielder

Senior career*
| Years | Team | Apps | (Gls) |
| 1975–1988 | El Nacional | | |
| 1988–1989 | Filanbanco | | |

International career
| 1976–1985 | Ecuador | 42 | (4) |
- * Club domestic league appearances and goals

José Voltaire Villafuerte Tenorio (born 27 November 1956) is an Ecuadorian retired footballer.

== Club career ==
Villafuerte spent almost his entire career with El Nacional through the 1970s and 1980s, winning 7 championships in 10 years. During this period he was also a key player for Ecuador, though the national side saw little success in the World Cup qualifiers and the Copa America this period.

Villafuerte was known for his vision, ball control and scoring record from midfield (including league top scorer in 1982). He remains one of the domestic league's all-time top 10 scorers.

== International career ==
He made 42 appearances for the Ecuador national football team from 1976 to 1985.
