= Nixon Carcelén =

Ecuadorian footballer (born 1969)

Personal information
- Full name: Nixon Aníbal Carcelén Chalá
- Date of birth: September 27, 1969 (age 57)
- Place of birth: Ecuador
- Height: 1.78 m (5 ft 10 in)
- Position: Midfielder

Senior career*
Years	Team	Apps	(Gls)
1988–1995	Deportivo Quito	201	(27)
1994	→ Barcelona (loan)	6	(0)
1996–2001	LDU Quito	182	(1)
2001	→ Barcelona (loan)	2	(0)
2002	→ Deportivo Cuenca (loan)	22	(0)
2003–2004	LDU Quito	16	(0)

International career
1991–1999	Ecuador	40	(1)
- * Club domestic league appearances and goals

Nixon Aníbal Carcelén Chalá (born September 27, 1969) is a former Ecuadorian international footballer who played 40 times for the Ecuador national team between 1991 and 1999

Carcelén spent the majority of his club career with the two main teams from Quito, LDU Quito and Deportivo Quito, he also played for Barcelona Sporting Club and Deportivo Cuenca towards the end of his career.

== Honors ==
=== Club ===
LDU Quito

- Serie A: 1998, 1999, 2003

=== Nation ===
Ecuador

- Korea Cup: 1995
