= Máximo Tenorio =

Ecuadorian footballer (born 1969)

Personal information
- Full name: Máximo Wilson Tenorio Quiñónez
- Date of birth: September 30, 1969 (age 57)
- Place of birth: Esmeraldas, Ecuador
- Height: 1.85 m (6 ft 1 in)
- Position: Left back

Senior career*
Years	Team	Apps	(Gls)
1992–1996	Emelec		
1996	Vasco da Gama		
1997	Barcelona SC		
1998–2000	Emelec		
2001	Barcelona SC		
2002–2003	Manta		

International career
1992–97	Ecuador	38	(3)
- * Club domestic league appearances and goals

Máximo Wilson Tenorio Quiñónez (born 30 September 1969 in Esmeraldas) is a retired Ecuadorian football defender. He was a member of the Ecuador national football team at the 1997 Copa América, and obtained a total number of 38 caps during his career.

== Honours ==
=== Club ===
- Club Sport Emelec
  - Serie A de Ecuador: 1993, 1994
- Barcelona SC
  - Serie A de Ecuador: 1997
