= Football in Ecuador =

Football (fútbol) in Ecuador
- Country: Ecuador
- Governing body: Ecuadorian Football Federation
- National team: Ecuador
- First played: 1867

National competitions
- FIFA World Cup; Copa América

Club competitions
- List: League: Ecuadorian Serie A; Cups: Copa Ecuador

International competitions
- FIFA Club World Cup; Copa Libertadores; Copa Sudamericana

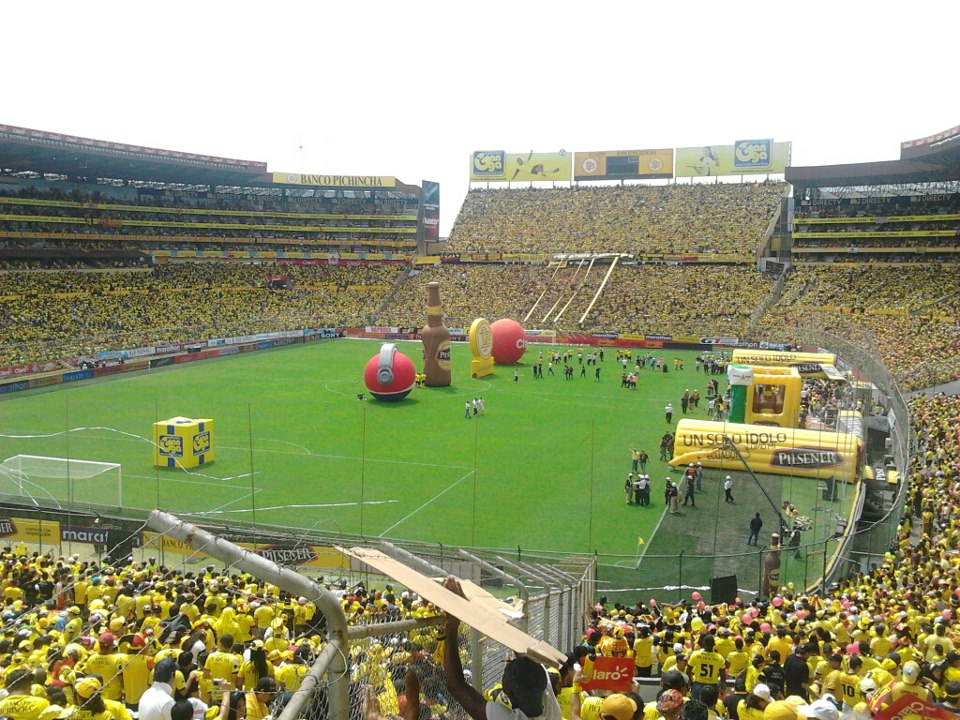
Monumental Stadium, prior to Barcelona Sporting Club's coronation as champions of Ecuadorian football.

Association football (simply called football) is the most popular sport in Ecuador, in line with the majority of South America. Approximately 65% of the people in Ecuador are interested in football.

== Governing body ==
The governing body of football in Ecuador is the Ecuadorian Football Federation (Spanish: Federación Ecuatoriana de Fútbol), also known as FEF or Ecuafútbol. It runs all national football tournaments and manages the national football teams. Its seat is in Guayaquil. In addition, there are 18 provincial association throughout the country.

== Club football ==
Club football is the most popular spectator sport in the country. The top-flight league in the country is the Serie A, followed by the Serie B. Both contain a small number of clubs compared to other leagues across the continent (12 each). Both tournaments are organized by FEF. But, for a considerable part of its history, club football was regionalized.

=== Regional leagues ===
The first amateur tournaments in Ecuador were organized by two regional leagues: one in Guayas for clubs in Guayaquil, and one in Pichincha for clubs in Quito and Ambato. Both held their inaugural tournaments in 1922. Both leagues stayed amateur until 1952, when the Guayas league held their first professional tournament. The Pichincha league, called Interandino followed suit in 1954. Both leagues stayed as the top-flight leagues in the country until 1967, when the status of top-flight was ceded to the national tournament.

=== National tournament ===
No national tournament existed until 1957 when the winners of both regional championships played against each other for the title. The first national title was won by Emelec. After a two-year hiatus, the national tournament returned in 1960 and has continued into the present. The Costa and Interandino Championships ceased to exist as a top-level tournament in 1967.

=== International participation ===
While typically a competitive country, clubs from Ecuador have had little international success. The first club to reach the finals of an international tournament was Barcelona, when they reached the finals of the 1990 and 1998 Copa Libertadores; they lost both. In 2001, Emelec became the second club to reach the finals of an international tournament at the 2001 Copa Merconorte, which they also lost. In 2008, LDU Quito became the first club to win an international title by becoming the 2008 Copa Libertadores champion. LDU Quito also went to win the Recopa Sudamericana and the Copa Sudamericana, both in 2009. To date, then in 2019 Independiente del Valle won the Copa Sudamericana, even before reaching their first national Championship.

== National team ==
The Ecuador national football team is controlled by the Federación Ecuatoriana de Fútbol and represents Ecuador in international football competitions. It was for a long time one of the weaker teams in CONMEBOL, but it has recently had more success, making their first World Cup appearance in 2002, and qualifying again for the 2006 and 2014 FIFA World Cup. In 2006, they advanced to the Round of 16, losing to England by 1–0.

Although without any major tournament achievements until the current millennium, Ecuador was never short of footballing talent, producing players such as Alberto Spencer, Jose Villafuerte, Carlos Raffo and Antonio Valencia. Ecuador has qualified for the World Cup a total of 4 times in the years 2002, 2006, 2014, as well as in 2022. Ecuador is yet to win a Copa América. Their best finish in Copa América was fourth in 1993 (they also finished fourth in the 'extra' South American Championship in 1959).

== +30,000-capacity football stadiums in Ecuador ==
#	Stadium	Capacity	City	Home team
1	Estadio Monumental Isidro Romero Carbo	59,283	Guayaquil	Barcelona S.C.
2	Estadio Modelo Alberto Spencer Herrera	42,000	Guayaquil	9 de Octubre F.C., C.S. Patria, C.D. Everest, Rocafuerte F.C., Panamá S.C.
3	Estadio Rodrigo Paz Delgado	41,575	Quito	Ecuador national football team, L.D.U. Quito
4	Estadio George Capwell	40,020	Guayaquil	C.S. Emelec
5	Estadio Olímpico Atahualpa	35,742	Quito	América de Quito, S.D. Quito, C.D. El Nacional, C.D. Universidad Católica del Ecuador

== Attendances ==
The average attendance per top-flight football league season and the club with the highest average attendance:

Season	League average	Best club	Best club average
2023 Primera Etapa	3,492	Emelec	11,945

Source: League page on Wikipedia
