= Cléber Chalá =

Ecuadorian footballer (born 1971)

Personal information
- Full name: Cléber Manuel Chalá Herrón
- Date of birth: 29 June 1971 (age 55)
- Place of birth: Imbabura, Ecuador
- Height: 1.83 m (6 ft 0 in)
- Position: Midfielder

Senior career*
Years	Team	Apps	(Gls)
1990–2001	El Nacional	359	(77)
2001–2002	Southampton	0	(0)
2002–2003	El Nacional	45	(16)
2004	Deportivo Quito	28	(7)
2004	Universidad San Martín	15	(2)
2005–2008	El Nacional	60	(9)
Total		507	(111)

International career
1992–2004	Ecuador	86	(6)
- * Club domestic league appearances and goals

Cléber Manuel Chalá Herrón (born 29 June 1971 in Imbabura) is a retired Ecuadorian football midfielder who played 86 games for the Ecuador national team between 1992 and 2004.

== Club career ==
At club level he has played mostly for Nacional Quito where he has made over 450 appearances and participated in 4 Ecuadorian league championship winning campaigns (1992, 1996, 2005A & 2006).

He has also played club football for Deportivo Quito and Universidad San Martín de Porres in Peru. He also had a spell in England with Southampton but never played in the first team. He was signed along with fellow countryman Agustín Delgado, but neither made an impact in English football.

== International career ==
Chalá played for Ecuador at the 2002 FIFA World Cup and in the 1993 Copa América, 1997 Copa América and 2001 Copa América.

== Personal life ==
He was father-in-law to fellow Ecuadorian footballer Christian Benítez, who married Chalá's daughter Lizeth in 2007.
