= Pietro Marsetti =

Ecuadorian footballer (born 1965)

Personal information
- Full name: Pietro Agustín Marsetti Rosales
- Date of birth: February 22, 1965 (age 61)
- Place of birth: Ecuador
- Position: Midfielder

Senior career*
Years	Team	Apps	(Gls)
1982–1986	Universidad Católica	?	(?)
1987–1997	L.D.U. Quito	221	(36)
1994	→ El Nacional (loan)	?	(?)
1996	→ Deportivo Quito (loan)	?	(?)
1997–2002	Deportivo Quito	?	(?)
2000	→ Delfín (loan)	27	(7)
2002	Universidad Católica	28	(2)

International career
1987–1989	Ecuador	25	(3)
- * Club domestic league appearances and goals as of November 2, 2002

Pietro Marsetti (born 22 February 1965) is a former footballer for L.D.U. Quito (1987–1997) and for the Ecuador national football team (1987–1989) where he scored 3 goals in 25 appearances.

== Career ==
Marsetti began playing youth football with Universidad Católica before signing a professional contract with L.D.U. Quito in 1987. He would play for clubs on both sides of the Quito derby: ten seasons with LDU Quito and four seasons with Sociedad Deportivo Quito.
