= Héctor Carabalí =

Ecuadorian footballer (born 1972)

Personal information
- Full name: Héctor Jhonny Carabalí Cevallos
- Date of birth: February 15, 1972 (age 54)
- Place of birth: Guayaquil, Ecuador
- Height: 1.87 m (6 ft 2 in)
- Position: Midfielder

Senior career*
Years	Team	Apps	(Gls)
1991–1999	Barcelona	136	(6)
1999	São Paulo	19	(0)
2000–2005	Deportivo Quito		
2006	Olmedo		
2006	Manta		
2007–2009	Deportivo Quito		
2009	ESPOLI		

International career
1992–1999	Ecuador	58	(2)
- * Club domestic league appearances and goals as of April 2008

Héctor Jhonny Carabalí Cevallos (born February 15, 1972) is a retired Ecuadorian football midfielder who made 58 appearances for the Ecuador national team between 1992 and 1999.

== Club career ==
At club level Carabalí was part of the Barcelona Sporting Club team that won the Ecuadorian league three times in the 1990s (1991, 1995 & 1997). He has also played for São Paulo in Brazil and a few other Ecuadorian teams.

== International career ==
Carabalí played for Ecuador in the Copa América 1993, 1995, 1997, and 1999.
