= 1995 Korea Cup =

Tournament details
- Host country: South Korea
- Dates: 3–12 June
- Teams: 8

Final positions
- Champions: Ecuador (1st title)
- Runners-up: Zambia

Tournament statistics
- Matches played: 15
- Goals scored: 42 (2.8 per match)
- Top scorer: (Ecuador) Eduardo Hurtado (5 goals)
- Best player: (Ecuador) Energio Díaz

The 1995 Korea Cup (Korean: 95 코리아컵 국제축구대회) was the 21st competition of Korea Cup. It was held from 3 to 12 June 1995, and was won by Ecuador for the first time.

== Group stage ==
=== Group A ===
Team	Pld	W	D	L	GF	GA	GD	Pts
South Korea	3	3	0	0	8	1	+7	9
Costa Rica	3	1	1	1	4	3	+1	4
(Brazil) Carioca XI	3	1	0	2	2	5	−3	3
(Scotland) Kilmarnock	3	0	1	2	4	9	−5	1

3 June 1995

South Korea	2–0	(Brazil) Carioca XI
Yoo Sang-chul 2', 29'	Report

Seoul Olympic Stadium, Seoul

3 June 1995

Costa Rica	2–2	(Scotland) Kilmarnock
Pérez 23'; Soto 71'	Report	Wright 12'; Maskrey 67'

5 June 1995

South Korea	1–0	Costa Rica
Kim Do-hoon 78'	Report

Suwon Sports Complex, Suwon
Attendance: 30,250

5 June 1995

Kilmarnock (Scotland)	1–2	(Brazil) Carioca XI

7 June 1995

Carioca XI (Brazil)	0–2	Costa Rica
	Report	Soto ?'; Murillo ?'

7 June 1995

Kilmarnock (Scotland)	1–5	South Korea
Findlay 45'	Report; Video	Hwang Sun-hong 27', 70'; Yoon Sang-chul 56'; Kim Pan-keun 58'; Roh Sang-rae 77'

Dongdaemun Stadium, Seoul

=== Group B ===
Team	Pld	W	D	L	GF	GA	GD	Pts
Ecuador	3	2	1	0	7	3	+4	7
Zambia	3	1	1	1	3	4	−1	4
(Belgium) Mechelen	3	0	2	1	3	4	−1	2
(Sweden) Trelleborg	3	0	2	1	3	5	−2	2

4 June 1995

Ecuador	4–1	Zambia
E. Hurtado 19', 66', 78', 81'		Bwalya 51'

Changwon Stadium, Changwon
Attendance: 12,013

4 June 1995

Mechelen (Belgium)	2–2	(Sweden) Trelleborg

6 June 1995

Trelleborg (Sweden)	1–1	Ecuador
Karlsson 7'	Report	Carcelén 25'

6 June 1995

Mechelen (Belgium)	0–0	Zambia

8 June 1995

Ecuador	2–1	(Belgium) Mechelen
Díaz ?', ?'	Report	? ?'

8 June 1995

Zambia	2–0	(Sweden) Trelleborg
Lota ?'; Kalunga ?'	Report

Changwon Stadium, Changwon

== Knockout stage ==
=== Bracket ===
Semi-finals
10 June – Seoul
South Korea	2
Zambia	3
10 June – Seoul
Ecuador	2
Costa Rica	1

Final
12 June – Seoul
Zambia	0
Ecuador	1

=== Semi-finals ===
10 June 1995

South Korea	2–3	Zambia
Roh Sang-rae 41'; Kim Do-hoon 61'		Mulenga 10'; Lota 51'; Mutale 79'

Dongdaemun Stadium, Seoul
Attendance: 26,328

10 June 1995

Ecuador	2–1	Costa Rica
E. Hurtado 37'; Díaz 57'		Madrigal 76'

Dongdaemun Stadium, Seoul
Attendance: 26,328

=== Final ===
12 June 1995

Zambia	0–1	Ecuador
		Díaz 46'

Dongdaemun Stadium, Seoul
Attendance: 18,724

== See also ==
- Korea Cup
- South Korea national football team results
