= Byron Tenorio =

Ecuadorian footballer (born 1966)

Personal information
- Full name: Byron Zózimo Tenorio Quintero
- Date of birth: June 14, 1966 (age 60)
- Place of birth: Ecuador
- Position: Defender

Senior career*
Years	Team	Apps	(Gls)
1985–1991	El Nacional		
1987	Esmeraldas Petrolero	30	(9)
1992–1996	Barcelona SC		
1997	Emelec	18	(2)
1998–1999	LDU Quito	61	(0)
2000	Unión Española		
2000	Deportivo Quito	9	(0)
2001	LDU Portoviejo	4	(0)

International career
1988–1997	Ecuador	53	(3)
- * Club domestic league appearances and goals

Byron Zózimo Tenorio Quintero (born 14 June 1966) is an Ecuadorian retired football defender.

== International career ==
Tenorio was a member of the Ecuador national football team for nine years, and obtained a total number of 53 caps during his career, scoring three goals. He made his debut on 7 June 1988 and played his last international match for Ecuador on 12 January 1997. He competed in three Copa Américas: 1989, 1991 and 1993.

== Retirement ==
Tenorio is currently a referee in the Ecuadorian Indoor Soccer Leagues in New York.
