= Ángel Fernández =

Ecuadorian footballer (born 1971)

Personal information
- Full name: Ángel Oswaldo Fernández Vernaza
- Date of birth: August 2, 1971 (age 55)
- Place of birth: Machala, Ecuador
- Height: 1.72 m (5 ft 7 1/2 in)
- Position: Striker

Senior career*
Years	Team	Apps	(Gls)
1990	River Plate Ríos		
1991	Green Cross		
1992–1999	Emelec	279	(71)
2000–2004	El Nacional	188	(29)
2005	Barcelona SC	33	(1)
2006	El Nacional	10	(0)
Total		510	(101)

International career
1991–2004	Ecuador	77	(12)
- * Club domestic league appearances and goals as of April 2008

Ángel Oswaldo Fernández Vernaza (born 2 August 1971) is an Ecuadorian footballer. He played 77 games for the Ecuador national team between 1991 and 2004.

== Club career ==
He played his entire club career in Ecuador. His main clubs were Emelec and Nacional Quito.

== International career ==
Fernández was a participant at the 2002 FIFA World Cup and played at the Copa América 1991, 1993, 1997, and 2001.

=== International goals ===
Ángel Fernández: International Goals
#	Date	Venue	Opponent	Score	Result	Competition
1.	04.07.1992	Montevideo, Uruguay	Uruguay	3–1	Loss	Friendly match
2.	27.01.1993	Guayaquil, Ecuador	Belarus	1–1	Draw	Friendly match
3.	27.01.1993	Quito, Ecuador	Peru	1–0	Win	Friendly match
4.	15.06.1993	Quito, Ecuador	Venezuela	6–1	Win	Copa América
5.	15.06.1993	Quito, Ecuador	Venezuela	6–1	Win	Copa América
6.	02.02.1996	Caracas, Venezuela	Venezuela	0–1	Win	Friendly match
7.	16.02.1996	Riyadh, Saudi Arabia	Oman	0–2	Win	Friendly match
8.	25.02.1996	Doha, Qatar	Qatar	1–2	Win	Friendly match
9.	30.06.1996	Portoviejo, Ecuador	Armenia	3–0	Win	Friendly match
10.	17.08.1996	Cuenca, Ecuador	Costa Rica	1–1	Draw	Friendly match
11.	17.07.2001	Barranquilla, Colombia	Venezuela	4–0	Win	Friendly match
12.	07.10.2001	La Paz, Bolivia	Bolivia	1–5	Win	2002 FIFA World Cup qualification
