= Club Deportivo Audaz Octubrino =

Ecuadorean football club

Audaz Octubrino
- Full name: Club Social y Deportivo Audaz Octubrino
- Nicknames: Verdes (Greens); Idolo de Machala (The Machala Idol); Súper Audaz; La Academia Verde (The Green Academy
- Founded: August 10, 1948; 77 years ago
- Ground: Estadio 9 de Mayo
- Capacity: 16,500
- Chairman: Mauricio Minuche
- Manager: Johnny Jiménez
- League: Segunda Categoría
Home colours	Away colours

Club Deportivo Audaz Octubrino is a professional football club from Machala, Ecuador that currently plays in the Segunda Categoría, the third tier of Football in Ecuador. Its stadium is called "9 de Mayo" and has a capacity of about 10,000 people.

== History ==
The best ever success for Audaz came about in the 1987–88 season with president Teofilo Oyola Cevallos, when they finished 3rd in the Ecuadorian league, only losing out to Barcelona (Guayaquil) and Filanbanco (Milagro, Guayas). That season Audaz was renowned as especially strong at home, beating, among others, El Nacional, Barcelona and Emelec. Audaz Octubrino won the Ecuadorian B-league in 1998 and then played one season in the premier league. Since then it didn't do too well.

In March 2006 the club ceased to exist due to financial problems, having been in debt of more than 130,000 US dollars. The city of Machala was left without a professional soccer team for the first time since the foundation of Audaz in 1948.

For the 2007–08 season the club was reformed, and now plays in the provincial "second division" of El Oro province, a third-level league.

Forward Eduardo Hurtado played for Audaz Octubrino in the season 2004–2005.
