= Estadio Modelo Alberto Spencer Herrera =

Football stadium in Guayaquil, Ecuador

Coordinates: 02°10′43.90″S 79°53′39.73″W

Modelo Stadium
- Estadio Modelo
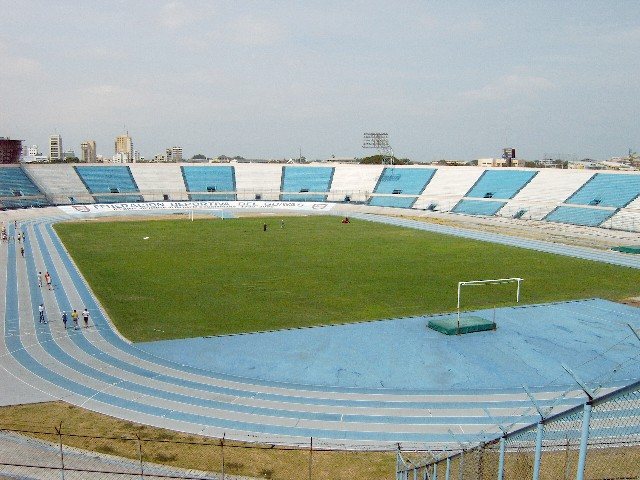
- Interactive map of Modelo Stadium
- Full name: Estadio Modelo Alberto Spencer
- Former names: Estadio Modelo Guayaquil
- Location: Guayaquil, Ecuador
- Operator: Fedeguayas
- Capacity: 42,000
- Surface: GrassMaster

Construction
- Opened: July 1959
- Renovated: 1980; 2001

Tenants
- Club 9 de Octubre; Club Sport Patria; Club Deportivo Everest; Rocafuerte F.C. Panamá Sporting Club

Estadio Modelo Alberto Spencer, also known as just Estadio Modelo, is a multi-purpose stadium in Guayaquil, Ecuador. It is currently used mostly for association football matches and it sometimes hosts games of Rocafuerte Fútbol Club, Club 9 de Octubre, Club Sport Patria, Club Deportivo Everest, Calvi Fútbol Club, Panamá Sporting Club and Club Sport Norteamérica. The stadium holds 42,000, and was opened in July 1959.

After the death of Copa Libertadores all-time top scorer and Ecuadorian national Alberto Spencer in November 2006, the Ecuadorian Football Federation renamed the stadium in his honor to Estadio Modelo Alberto Spencer Herrera.

The stadium was one of the hosts in the 2001 South American U-20 Championship.

Colombian singer Shakira performed a sold-out concert at the stadium on November 30, 2006 as part of her Oral Fixation Tour.

Violetta cast performed a concert at the venue on May 17, 2015 as part of Violetta Live International Tour.

Soy luna cast performed at the venue two times between May 2017 and August 2018 with their tours Soy Luna en Concierto and Soy Luna en Vivo. These concerts brought over 58,000 people.
