= Estadio Monumental Isidro Romero Carbo =

Football stadium in Guayaquil, Ecuador

Estadio Monumental Banco Pichincha
- El Monumental; El Coloso del Salado; El Templo
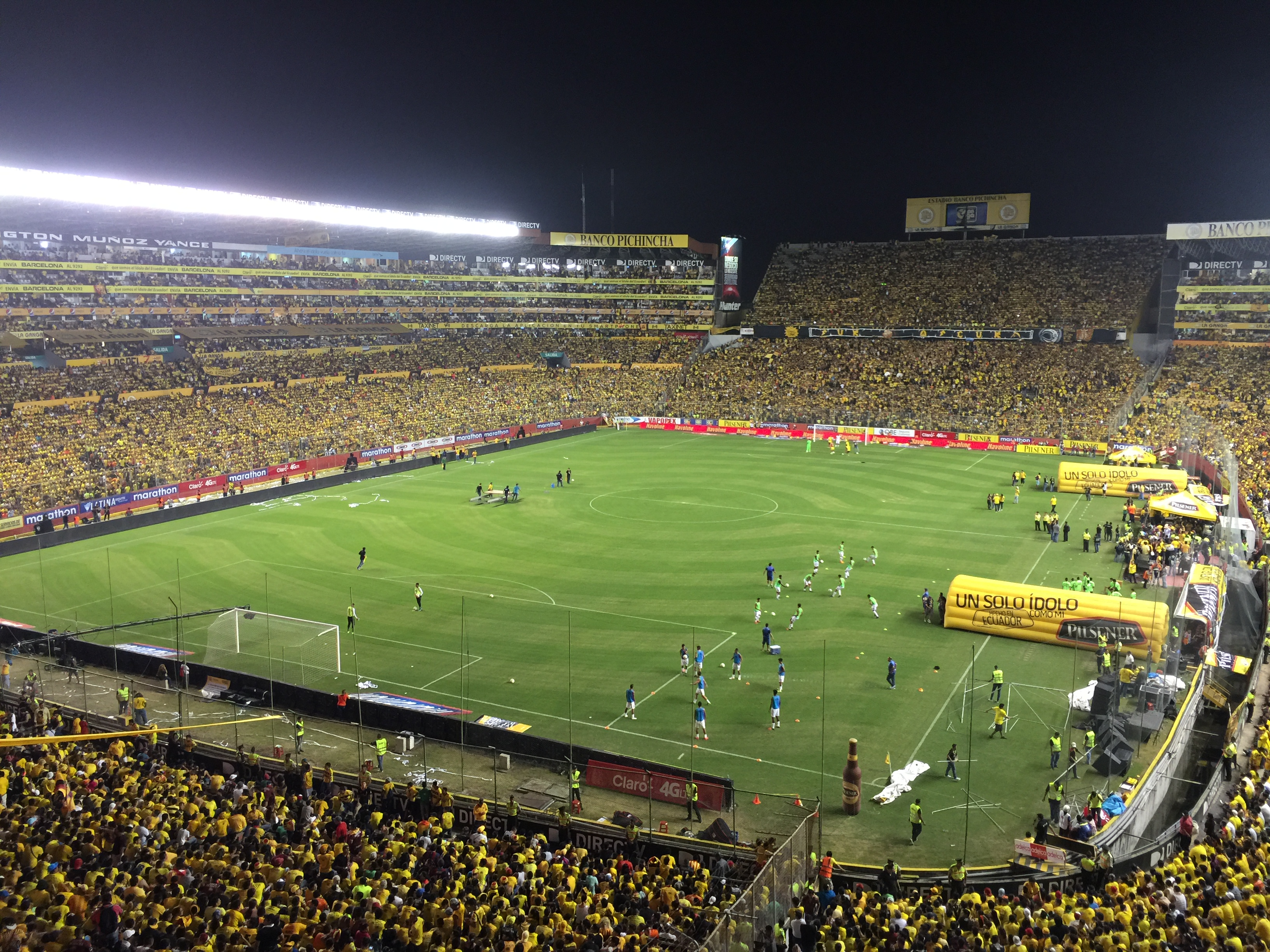
- Interactive map of Estadio Monumental Banco Pichincha
- Full name: Estadio Monumental Banco Pichincha
- Former names: Monumental de Barcelona
- Location: Guayaquil, Ecuador
- Coordinates: 2°11′9″S 79°55′30″W
- Elevation: 10 m (33 ft)
- Owner: Barcelona Sporting Club
- Operator: Barcelona Sporting Club
- Capacity: 57,267; 57,267 (international)
- Surface: Grass
- Scoreboard: Yes
- Field size: 105 x 70 meters

Construction
- Built: 1987
- Opened: December 27, 1987
- Cost: $70,000,000
- Architect: Jose Viteri

Tenants
- Barcelona S.C. (1987–present); Ecuador national football team (selected matches)

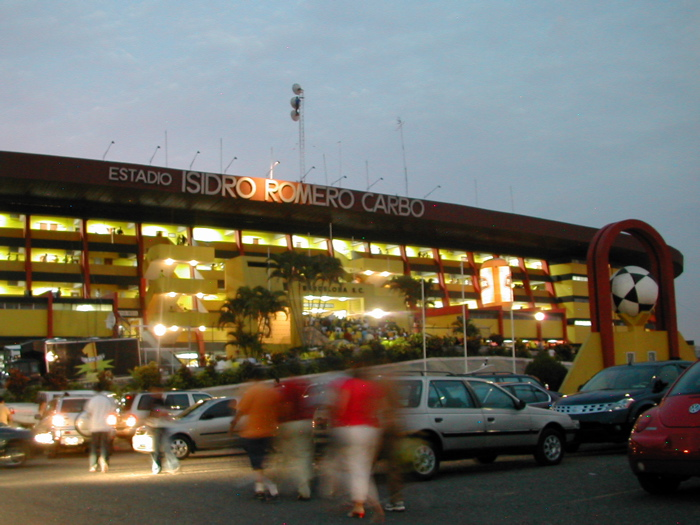
Front view of the exterior in 2005

The Estadio Monumental Banco Pichincha is a football stadium in Bellavista Guayaquil, Ecuador. The stadium is home to Ecuadorian football club Barcelona SC. It has a capacity of 57,267, which makes it the largest stadium in Ecuador. It is located 10 meters (32.8 feet) above sea level.

== History ==
Club president Isidro Romero Carbo wanted Barcelona, at the time playing their home games at the Estadio Modelo Alberto Spencer Herrera, to have their own stadium.

The stadium was inaugurated on December 27, 1987. The first game was played against Peñarol of Uruguay, which Barcelona SC lost 1-3. Barcelona invited many South American football celebrities, such as Pelé, to the inauguration; Pelé compared the stadium to the famous Maracanã in Rio de Janeiro:

Se o Maracanã é o maior estádio do mundo, o Monumental é um dos mais belos.
(If Maracanã is the largest stadium in the world, Monumental is one of the most beautiful in the world)

There is a golden plaque in the stadium celebrating this description.

There are healthcare facilities, clothing-and-souvenir shops, and restaurants, in a total area of about 5,100 m^{2}. The football field is 105 metres long and 70 metres wide. The training field near the stadium is called Alternate Field Sigifredo Agapito Chuchuca in honor of one of the greatest midfielders in team history.

The stadium hosted 5 matches of the 1993 Copa América, including the final.

On January 2, 2008, president of Barcelona Eduardo Maruri signed a 4-year contract with Ecuadorian bank Banco Pichincha to have the stadium named after the bank. The contract was renewed but came to an end in 2015.

An aerial lift or cable car to connect the stadium with the "Aerovia" Julian Coronel station in downtown Guayaquil was scheduled to start in 2021.
