= 1989 Copa América squads =

List of footballers

These are the squads for the countries that played in the 1989 Copa América held in Brazil.

== Group A ==
=== Brazil ===
Head Coach: Sebastião Lazaroni

Charles and Zé Carlos added to the squad for the final phase. Tita and Zé Teodoro injured replaced for Bismarck and Josimar for final Phase.

No.	Pos.	Player	Date of birth (age)	Caps	Club
1	GK	Claudio Taffarel	8 May 1966 (aged 23)	9	(Brazil) Internacional
2	MF	Mazinho	8 April 1966 (aged 23)	5	(Brazil) Vasco da Gama
3	DF	Mauro Galvão	19 December 1961 (aged 27)	3	(Brazil) Botafogo
4	DF	André Cruz	20 September 1968 (aged 20)	9	(Brazil) Ponte Preta
5	DF	Branco	4 April 1964 (aged 25)	18	(Portugal) FC Porto
6	DF	Ricardo Gomes	13 December 1964 (aged 24)	16	(Portugal) Benfica
7	FW	Bebeto	16 February 1964 (aged 25)	10	(Brazil) Flamengo
8	MF	Geovani	6 April 1964 (aged 25)	16	(Brazil) Vasco da Gama
9	MF	Valdo	12 January 1964 (aged 25)	22	(Portugal) Benfica
10	FW	Tita	1 April 1958 (aged 31)	25	(Italy) Pescara
10	FW	Bismarck	17 September 1969 (aged 19)	5	(Brazil) Vasco da Gama
11	FW	Romário	29 January 1966 (aged 23)	14	(Netherlands) PSV Eindhoven
12	GK	Acácio	20 January 1959 (aged 30)	6	(Brazil) Vasco da Gama
13	DF	Josimar	19 September 1961 (aged 27)	12	(Brazil) Botafogo
13	DF	Zé Teodoro	22 November 1963 (aged 25)	2	(Brazil) São Paulo
14	DF	Aldair	30 November 1965 (aged 23)	3	(Portugal) Benfica
15	MF	Alemão	22 November 1961 (aged 27)	20	(Italy) Napoli
16	MF	Cristóvão	9 June 1959 (aged 30)	6	(Brazil) Grêmio
17	MF	Dunga	31 October 1963 (aged 25)	5	(Italy) Fiorentina
18	FW	Renato Gaúcho	9 September 1962 (aged 26)	17	(Italy) Roma
19	FW	Baltazar	17 July 1959 (aged 29)	3	(Spain) Atlético Madrid
20	MF	Silas	27 August 1965 (aged 23)	13	(Portugal) Sporting CP
21	FW	Charles	12 April 1968 (aged 21)	4	(Brazil) Bahia
22	GK	Zé Carlos	7 February 1962 (aged 27)	2	(Brazil) Flamengo

=== Colombia ===
Head Coach: Francisco Maturana

No.	Pos.	Player	Date of birth (age)	Caps	Club
1	GK	René Higuita	27 August 1966 (aged 22)		(Colombia) Atlético Nacional
2	DF	Andrés Escobar	13 March 1967 (aged 22)		(Colombia) Atlético Nacional
3	DF	Gildardo Gómez	13 October 1963 (aged 25)		(Colombia) Atlético Nacional
4	DF	Wilson Pérez	6 August 1967 (aged 21)		(Colombia) Atlético Junior
5	DF	Carlos Hoyos	28 February 1962 (aged 27)		(Colombia) Atlético Junior
6	MF	Gabriel Gómez	15 December 1959 (aged 29)		(Colombia) Independiente Medellín
7	FW	Antony de Ávila	21 December 1962 (aged 26)		(Colombia) América de Cali
8	MF	Alexis García	27 January 1960 (aged 29)		(Colombia) Atlético Nacional
9	FW	Sergio Angulo	14 September 1960 (aged 28)		(Colombia) América de Cali
10	MF	Carlos Valderrama	2 September 1961 (aged 27)		(France) Montpellier
11	MF	Bernardo Redín	23 February 1963 (aged 26)		(Colombia) Deportivo Cali
12	FW	León Villa	12 January 1960 (aged 29)		(Colombia) Atlético Nacional
13	DF	Alexis Mendoza	9 November 1961 (aged 27)		(Colombia) Atlético Junior
14	MF	Leonel Álvarez	29 July 1965 (aged 23)		(Colombia) Atlético Nacional
15	DF	Luis Carlos Perea	29 December 1963 (aged 25)		(Colombia) Atlético Nacional
16	FW	Arnoldo Iguarán	18 January 1957 (aged 32)		(Colombia) Millonarios
17	FW	John Jairo Trellez	29 April 1968 (aged 21)		(Colombia) Atlético Nacional
18	DF	Wilmer Cabrera	15 September 1967 (aged 21)		(Colombia) Independiente Santa Fe
19	GK	Eduardo Niño	8 August 1967 (aged 21)		(Colombia) Independiente Santa Fe
20	FW	Rubén Darío Hernández	19 February 1965 (aged 24)		(Colombia) Millonarios

=== Paraguay ===
Head Coach: (Argentina) Eduardo Luján Manera.

Ramón Escobar added to the squad for the final phase.

No.	Pos.	Player	Date of birth (age)	Caps	Club
1	DF	Luis Caballero	16 September 1962 (aged 26)		(Paraguay) Guaraní
2	MF	Augusto Chamorro	12 May 1963 (aged 26)		(Paraguay) Atlético Colegiales
3	DF	Virginio Cáceres	12 May 1962 (aged 27)		(Paraguay) Guaraní
4	MF	Adolfino Cañete	13 September 1956 (aged 32)		(Argentina) Talleres de Córdoba
5	GK	Darío Espínola	12 September 1967 (aged 21)		(Paraguay) Sol de América
6	DF	Rogelio Delgado	12 October 1959 (aged 29)		(Argentina) Independiente
7	GK	Roberto Fernández	29 July 1956 (aged 32)		(Paraguay) Cerro Porteño
8	FW	Buenaventura Ferreira	4 July 1960 (aged 28)		(Paraguay) Guaraní
9	MF	Julio César Franco López	1 October 1965 (aged 23)		(Paraguay) Guaraní
10	MF	Jorge Guasch	17 January 1961 (aged 28)		(Paraguay) Olimpia
11	DF	Justo Jacquet	9 September 1961 (aged 27)		(Paraguay) Cerro Porteño
12	FW	Alfredo Mendoza	31 December 1963 (aged 25)		(Paraguay) Olimpia
13	MF	Gustavo Neffa	3 November 1971 (aged 17)		(Paraguay) Olimpia
14	FW	Eumelio Palacios	15 September 1964 (aged 24)		(Paraguay) Libertad
15	DF	Catalino Rivarola	30 April 1965 (aged 24)		(Paraguay) Cerro Porteño
16	FW	Félix Brítez Román	27 March 1967 (aged 22)		(Paraguay) Cerro Porteño
17	GK	Rubén Ruiz Díaz	11 November 1969 (aged 19)		(Argentina) Talleres de Córdoba
18	MF	Vidal Sanabria	11 April 1967 (aged 22)		(Paraguay) Olimpia
19	DF	Juan Bautista Torales	9 May 1956 (aged 33)		(Paraguay) Libertad
20	DF	César Zabala	3 June 1961 (aged 28)		(Paraguay) Cerro Porteño
21	MF	Ramón Escobar	3 October 1964 (aged 24)		(Paraguay) River Plate
22	MF	Carlos Guirland	18 September 1968 (aged 20)		(Paraguay) Olimpia
23	MF	Félix Torres	28 April 1962 (aged 27)		(Argentina) Deportivo Mandiyú

=== Peru ===
Head Coach: (Brazil) Pepe

No.	Pos.	Player	Date of birth (age)	Caps	Club
1	GK	César Chávez-Riva	22 November 1964 (aged 24)		(Peru) Universitario
2	DF	Jorge Talavera	31 December 1963 (aged 25)		(Peru) Sportivo Internationale
3	DF	Juan Reynoso	28 December 1969 (aged 19)		(Peru) Alianza Lima
4	DF	Jorge Arteaga	29 December 1966 (aged 22)		(Peru) Sporting Cristal
5	DF	Pedro Requena	15 October 1961 (aged 27)		(Peru) Universitario
6	FW	José Luis Carranza	8 January 1964 (aged 25)		(Peru) Universitario
7	MF	Francesco Manassero	4 December 1964 (aged 24)		(Peru) Sporting Cristal
8	MF	José del Solar	28 November 1967 (aged 21)		(Peru) Universitario
9	FW	Franco Navarro	10 November 1961 (aged 27)		(Switzerland) FC Wettingen
10	MF	Julio César Uribe	9 May 1958 (aged 31)		(Colombia) América de Cali
11	FW	Jorge Hirano	14 August 1956 (aged 32)		(Bolivia) Bolívar
12	GK	Jesús Purizaga	5 December 1960 (aged 28)		(Peru) Sporting Cristal
13	MF	Wilmar Valencia	27 October 1962 (aged 26)		(Bolivia) Blooming
14	DF	Percy Olivares	6 May 1968 (aged 21)		(Peru) Sporting Cristal
15	FW	Eduardo Rey Muñoz	7 August 1957 (aged 31)		(Peru) Universitario
16	DF	Jorge Olaechea	27 August 1956 (aged 32)		(Peru) Sporting Cristal
17	FW	Martín Dall'Orso	1 September 1966 (aged 22)		(Peru) Sporting Cristal
18	DF	Carlos Guido	18 April 1966 (aged 23)		(Peru) Sporting Cristal
19	FW	Carlos Torres	25 May 1966 (aged 23)		(Peru) Sportivo Internationale
20	MF	César Rodríguez	21 September 1965 (aged 23)		(Peru) Deportivo Municipal

=== Venezuela ===
Head Coach: (Argentina) Carlos Horacio Moreno

No.	Pos.	Player	Date of birth (age)	Caps	Club
1	GK	César Baena	16 January 1961 (aged 28)		(Venezuela) Caracas FC
2	DF	William Pacheco	18 April 1962 (aged 27)		(Venezuela) Unión Atlético Táchira
3	DF	Andrés Paz	30 November 1963 (aged 25)		(Venezuela) Unión Atlético Táchira
4	DF	Pedro Acosta	28 November 1959 (aged 29)		(Venezuela) Caracas FC
5	DF	Luis Rojas	1 August 1963 (aged 25)		(Venezuela) Unión Atlético Táchira
6	MF	Roberto Cavallo	28 April 1967 (aged 22)		(Venezuela) Deportivo Italia
7	FW	Herbert Márquez	10 November 1961 (aged 27)		(Venezuela) Mineros
8	MF	Laureano Jaimes	13 July 1961 (aged 27)		(Venezuela) Unión Atlético Táchira
9	MF	Bernardo Añor	7 October 1959 (aged 29)		(Venezuela) Caracas FC
10	MF	Carlos Maldonado	30 July 1963 (aged 25)		(Venezuela) Unión Atlético Táchira
11	MF	Noel Sanvicente	21 December 1964 (aged 24)		(Venezuela) Marítimo
12	GK	José Gregorio Gómez	27 December 1963 (aged 25)		(Venezuela) Mineros
13	DF	René Torres	13 October 1960 (aged 28)		(Venezuela) Mineros
14	FW	Pedro Febles	18 April 1958 (aged 31)		(Venezuela) Marítimo
15	DF	Luis Camacaro	24 November 1967 (aged 21)		(Venezuela) Unión Atlético Táchira
16	FW	Carlos Domínguez	17 April 1966 (aged 23)		(Venezuela) Caracas FC
17	MF	Ildemaro Fernández	27 December 1961 (aged 27)		(Venezuela) Estudiantes de Mérida
18	MF	Héctor Rivas	27 September 1968 (aged 20)		(Venezuela) Marítimo
19	FW	Stalin Rivas	5 August 1971 (aged 17)		(Venezuela) Mineros
20	FW	Enrique Samuel	16 November 1967 (aged 21)		(Venezuela) Mineros

== Group B ==
=== Argentina ===
Head Coach: Carlos Bilardo

Ricardo Giusti and Abel Balbo added to the squad for the final phase

No.	Pos.	Player	Date of birth (age)	Caps	Club
1	GK	Nery Pumpido	30 July 1957 (aged 31)		(Spain) Real Betis
2	MF	Sergio Batista	9 November 1962 (aged 26)		(Argentina) River Plate
3	FW	Carlos Alfaro Moreno	16 October 1964 (aged 24)		(Argentina) Independiente
4	FW	Abel Balbo	1 June 1966 (aged 23)		(Argentina) River Plate
5	DF	José Luis Brown	10 November 1956 (aged 32)		(Spain) Real Murcia
6	MF	José Basualdo	20 June 1963 (aged 26)		(Argentina) Deportivo Mandiyú
7	MF	Jorge Burruchaga	9 October 1962 (aged 26)		(France) FC Nantes
8	FW	Claudio Caniggia	9 January 1967 (aged 22)		(Italy) Verona
9	DF	José Luis Cuciuffo	1 February 1961 (aged 28)		(Argentina) Boca Juniors
10	MF	Diego Maradona	30 October 1960 (aged 28)		(Italy) Napoli
11	FW	Gabriel Calderón	7 February 1960 (aged 29)		(France) Paris Saint-Germain
12	DF	Néstor Clausen	29 September 1962 (aged 26)		(Switzerland) Sion
13	DF	Hernán Díaz	26 February 1965 (aged 24)		(Argentina) Rosario Central
14	MF	Héctor Enrique	26 April 1962 (aged 27)		(Argentina) River Plate
15	MF	Ricardo Giusti	11 December 1956 (aged 32)		(Argentina) Independiente
16	DF	Pedro Monzón	23 February 1962 (aged 27)		(Argentina) Independiente
17	DF	Oscar Ruggeri	26 January 1962 (aged 27)		(Spain) Real Madrid
18	GK	Luis Islas	22 December 1965 (aged 23)		(Spain) Atlético Madrid
19	DF	Roberto Sensini	12 October 1966 (aged 22)		(Argentina) Newell's Old Boys
20	MF	Pedro Troglio	28 July 1965 (aged 23)		(Italy) Verona
21	MF	Néstor Gorosito	14 May 1964 (aged 25)		(Argentina) San Lorenzo
22	GK	Julio César Falcioni	20 July 1956 (aged 32)		(Argentina) Vélez Sársfield

=== Bolivia ===
Head Coach: (Argentina) Jorge Habegger

No.	Pos.	Player	Date of birth (age)	Caps	Club
1	GK	Luis Galarza	26 December 1950 (aged 38)		(Bolivia) Bolívar
2	DF	Carlos Arias	26 August 1956 (aged 32)		(Bolivia) Bolívar
3	MF	Carlos Borja	25 December 1956 (aged 32)		(Bolivia) Bolívar
4	MF	Marco Etcheverry	26 September 1970 (aged 18)		(Bolivia) Destroyers
5	DF	Marco Ferrufino	25 April 1963 (aged 26)		(Bolivia) Bolívar
6	DF	Ricardo Fontana	17 October 1950 (aged 38)		(Bolivia) The Strongest
7	FW	Arturo García	14 May 1965 (aged 24)		(Bolivia) Oriente Petrolero
8	DF	Eligio Martínez	21 July 1955 (aged 33)		(Bolivia) The Strongest
9	MF	José Milton Melgar	20 September 1959 (aged 29)		(Bolivia) Bolívar
10	FW	Roly Paniagua	14 November 1966 (aged 22)		(Bolivia) Blooming
11	FW	Álvaro Peña	11 September 1966 (aged 22)		(Bolivia) Blooming
12	GK	Marco Antonio Barrero	26 January 1962 (aged 27)		(Bolivia) Bolívar
13	DF	Miguel Rimba	1 November 1967 (aged 21)		(Bolivia) Bolívar
14	DF	Rómer Roca	1 July 1966 (aged 23)		(Bolivia) Oriente Petrolero
15	DF	Marciano Saldías	25 April 1966 (aged 23)		(Bolivia) Oriente Petrolero
16	FW	Fernando Salinas	12 June 1962 (aged 27)		(Bolivia) Bolívar
17	FW	Erwin Sánchez	19 October 1969 (aged 19)		(Bolivia) Bolívar
18	MF	Francisco Takeo	13 May 1966 (aged 23)		(Bolivia) Destroyers
19	DF	Eduardo Villegas	29 March 1964 (aged 25)		(Bolivia) The Strongest
20	FW	Ramiro Castillo	27 March 1966 (aged 23)		(Argentina) Argentinos Juniors

=== Chile ===
Head Coach: Orlando Aravena

No.	Pos.	Player	Date of birth (age)	Caps	Club
1	GK	Roberto Rojas	8 August 1957 (aged 31)		(Brazil) São Paulo
2	DF	Patricio Reyes	27 November 1957 (aged 31)		(Chile) Deportes La Serena
3	FW	Patricio Yáñez	20 January 1961 (aged 28)		(Spain) Real Betis
4	DF	Leonel Contreras	30 August 1961 (aged 27)		(Chile) Deportes La Serena
5	DF	Hugo González	11 March 1963 (aged 26)		(Chile) Colo-Colo
6	MF	Jaime Pizarro	2 March 1964 (aged 25)		(Chile) Colo-Colo
7	MF	Héctor Puebla	10 July 1955 (aged 33)		(Chile) Cobreloa
8	MF	Raúl Ormeño	21 June 1958 (aged 31)		(Chile) Colo-Colo
9	FW	Juan Carlos Letelier	20 May 1959 (aged 30)		(Chile) Deportes La Serena
10	MF	Juan Covarrubias	15 January 1961 (aged 28)		(Chile) Cobreloa
11	DF	Fernando Astengo	8 January 1960 (aged 29)		(Brazil) Grêmio
12	GK	Marco Cornez	15 October 1957 (aged 31)		(Chile) Universidad Católica
13	MF	Jaime Vera	25 March 1963 (aged 26)		(Greece) OFI
14	DF	Jorge Carrasco	3 November 1960 (aged 28)		(Chile) Huachipato
15	MF	Juvenal Olmos	4 October 1962 (aged 26)		(Chile) Universidad Católica
16	FW	Osvaldo Hurtado	2 November 1957 (aged 31)		(Belgium) Charleroi
17	MF	Jaime Ramírez	3 March 1967 (aged 22)		(Chile) Unión Española
18	DF	Alejandro Hisis	16 February 1962 (aged 27)		(Greece) OFI
19	FW	Lukas Tudor	21 February 1969 (aged 20)		(Chile) Universidad Católica
20	GK	Oscar Wirth	5 November 1955 (aged 33)		(Colombia) Independiente Medellín

=== Ecuador ===
Head Coach: (Socialist Federal Republic of Yugoslavia) Dušan Drašković

No.	Pos.	Player	Date of birth (age)	Caps	Club
1	GK	Carlos Morales	12 June 1965 (aged 24)		(Ecuador) Barcelona
2	DF	Jimmy Izquierdo	28 May 1961 (aged 28)		(Ecuador) Barcelona
3	DF	Hólger Quiñónez	18 August 1962 (aged 26)		(Ecuador) Barcelona
4	DF	Wilson Macías	30 September 1965 (aged 23)		(Ecuador) Filanbanco
5	MF	Kléber Fajardo	1 January 1965 (aged 24)		(Ecuador) Emelec
6	DF	Luis Capurro	1 May 1961 (aged 28)		(Ecuador) Emelec
7	MF	Pietro Marsetti	21 November 1964 (aged 24)		(Ecuador) LDU Quito
8	MF	Alex Aguinaga	9 July 1968 (aged 20)		(Ecuador) Deportivo Quito
9	DF	Byron Tenorio	14 June 1966 (aged 23)		(Ecuador) El Nacional
10	MF	Hamilton Cuvi	8 May 1960 (aged 29)		(Ecuador) Filanbanco
11	FW	Nelson Guerrero	12 September 1962 (aged 26)		(Ecuador) LDU Quito
12	GK	Víctor Mendoza	24 August 1963 (aged 25)		(Ecuador) Aucas
13	DF	Claudio Alcívar	15 July 1966 (aged 22)		(Ecuador) Barcelona
14	FW	Ney Raúl Avíles	17 February 1964 (aged 25)		(Ecuador) Emelec
15	MF	Enrique Verduga	19 January 1964 (aged 25)		(Ecuador) Emelec
16	MF	Julio César Rosero	11 June 1964 (aged 25)		(Ecuador) El Nacional
17	FW	Carlos Muñoz	24 October 1967 (aged 21)		(Ecuador) Filanbanco
18	MF	Tulio Quinteros	4 May 1963 (aged 26)		(Ecuador) Barcelona
19	MF	Hermen Benítez	4 May 1961 (aged 28)		(Ecuador) El Nacional
20	DF	Jimmy Montanero	24 August 1960 (aged 28)		(Ecuador) Barcelona

=== Uruguay ===
Head Coach: Oscar Tabárez

Oscar Ferro and Edison Suarez added to the squad for the final phase

No.	Pos.	Player	Date of birth (age)	Caps	Club
1	GK	Javier Zeoli	2 May 1962 (aged 27)		(Uruguay) Danubio
2	DF	Nelson Gutiérrez	13 April 1962 (aged 27)		(Italy) Lazio
3	DF	Hugo De León	27 February 1958 (aged 31)		(Uruguay) Nacional
4	DF	José Herrera	17 June 1965 (aged 24)		(Uruguay) Peñarol
5	MF	José Perdomo	5 January 1965 (aged 24)		(Uruguay) Peñarol
6	DF	Alfonso Domínguez	24 September 1965 (aged 23)		(Uruguay) Peñarol
7	FW	Antonio Alzamendi	7 June 1956 (aged 33)		(Spain) Logroñés
8	MF	Gabriel Correa	13 January 1968 (aged 21)		(Uruguay) Peñarol
9	FW	Enzo Francéscoli	12 November 1961 (aged 27)		(France) Racing Club Paris
10	MF	Ruben Paz	8 August 1959 (aged 29)		(Argentina) Racing Club
11	FW	Ruben Sosa	25 April 1966 (aged 23)		(Italy) Lazio
12	GK	Jorge Seré	9 July 1961 (aged 27)		(Uruguay) Nacional
13	DF	Daniel Revelez	30 September 1959 (aged 29)		(Uruguay) Nacional
14	DF	José Pintos Saldanha	25 March 1964 (aged 25)		(Uruguay) Nacional
15	MF	Santiago Ostolaza	10 July 1962 (aged 26)		(Uruguay) Nacional
16	FW	Sergio Martínez	15 February 1969 (aged 20)		(Uruguay) Defensor Sporting
17	FW	Carlos Aguilera	21 September 1964 (aged 24)		(Uruguay) Peñarol
18	MF	Ruben Pereira	28 January 1968 (aged 21)		(Uruguay) Danubio
19	FW	Ruben da Silva	11 April 1968 (aged 21)		(Uruguay) Danubio
20	MF	Pablo Bengoechea	27 June 1965 (aged 24)		(Spain) Sevilla
21	GK	Oscar Ferro	2 March 1967 (aged 22)		(Uruguay) Peñarol
22	MF	Edison Suarez	6 November 1966 (aged 22)		(Uruguay) Danubio
