= Peru national football team results (1980–1999) =

This is a list of the Peru national football team results from 1980 to 1999.

== Results ==
Key
Win
Draw
Defeat

=== 1980 ===
18 July Friendly	Uruguay	0–0	Peru	Montevideo
15:30 UTC−3		Report		Stadium: Estadio Centenario; Attendance: 9,604; Referee: Edison Pérez Núñez (Peru)

12 November Friendly	Peru	1–1	Uruguay	Lima
	Uribe 14'	Report	Krasouski 25'	Stadium: Estadio Alejandro Villanueva; Referee: Edison Pérez Núñez (Peru)

=== 1981 ===
4 February Friendly	Peru	1–3	Czech Republic	Lima
	Uribe 58'	Report	Vízek 21', 62'; Jakubec 49'	Stadium: Estadio Alejandro Villanueva; Attendance: 13,000; Referee: Pedro Reyes (Peru)

12 February Friendly	Peru	1–2	Bulgaria	Lima
	Correa 29'	Report	Zehtinski 40'; Tsvetkov 81'	Stadium: Estadio Nacional; Attendance: 35,000; Referee: Carlos Montalvan (Peru)

19 April Friendly	Chile	3–0	Peru	Santiago
	Moscoso 29', 75'; Caszely 66' (pen.)	Report		Stadium: Estadio Nacional; Attendance: 20,692; Referee: Arturo Ithurralde (Argentina)

26 July 1982 FIFA World Cup qualification	Colombia	1–1	Peru	Bogotá
	Herrera 64'	Report	La Rosa 86'	Stadium: Estadio El Campín; Attendance: 20,000; Referee: Arturo Ithurralde (Argentina)

5 August Friendly	Peru	1–2	Chile	Lima
	Olaechea 64'	Report	Caszely 4', 20'	Stadium: Estadio Nacional; Referee: Sergio Leiblinger (Peru)

16 August 1982 FIFA World Cup qualification	Peru	2–0	Colombia	Lima
	Barbadillo 5'; Uribe 72' (pen.)	Report		Stadium: Estadio Nacional; Attendance: 43,942; Referee: Vicente Llobregat (Venezuela)

23 August 1982 FIFA World Cup qualification	Uruguay	1–2	Peru	Montevideo
	Victorino 67'	Report	La Rosa 39'; Uribe 47'	Stadium: Estadio Centenario; Attendance: 67,938; Referee: Juan Silvagno Cavanna (Chile)

6 September 1982 FIFA World Cup qualification	Peru	0–0	Uruguay	Lima
		Report		Stadium: Estadio Nacional; Attendance: 44,325; Referee: Arnaldo Cézar Coelho (Brazil)

=== 1982 ===
23 March Friendly	Chile	2–1	Peru	Santiago
	Letelier 15'; Neira 25'	Report	Figueroa 18' (o.g.)	Stadium: Estadio Nacional; Attendance: 49,849; Referee: Edison Pérez Núñez (Peru)

30 March Copa del Pacífico	Peru	1–0	Chile	Lima
	Navarro 39'	Report		Stadium: Estadio Alejandro Villanueva; Referee: Víctor Ojeda (Chile)

18 April Friendly	Hungary	1–2	Peru	Budapest
	Szentes 1'	Report	Uribe 55', 81'	Stadium: Népstadion; Attendance: 20,000; Referee: Horst Brummeier (Austria)

25 April Friendly	Algeria	1–1	Peru	Algiers
	Madjer 89'	Report	Cueto 34'	Stadium: Stade du 5 Juillet; Attendance: 50,000; Referee: Mohamed Hansal (Algeria)

28 April Friendly	France	0–1	Peru	Paris
		Report	Oblitas 82'	Stadium: Parc des Princes; Attendance: 46,429; Referee: André Daina (Switzerland)

17 May Friendly	Peru	2–0	Romania	Lima
	Uribe 45' (pen.); Velásquez 88'	Report		Stadium: Estadio Nacional; Attendance: 22,000; Referee: Sergio Leiblinger (Peru)

15 June 1982 FIFA World Cup Group 1	Peru	0–0	Cameroon	A Coruña
17:15 UTC+2		Report		Stadium: Estadio de Riazor; Attendance: 11,000; Referee: Franz Wöhrer (Austria)

18 June 1982 FIFA World Cup Group 1	Italy	1–1	Peru	Vigo
17:15 UTC+2	Conti 18'	Report	Díaz 83'	Stadium: Balaídos; Attendance: 25,000; Referee: Walter Eschweiler (West Germany)

22 June 1982 FIFA World Cup Group 1	Poland	5–1	Peru	A Coruña
17:15 UTC+2	Smolarek 55'; Lato 58'; Boniek 61'; Buncol 68'; Ciołek 76'	Report	La Rosa 83'	Stadium: Estadio de Riazor; Attendance: 25,000; Referee: Mario Rubio Vázquez (Mexico)

=== 1983 ===
18 July Friendly	Uruguay	1–1	Peru	Montevideo
	Luzardo 49'	Report	Caballero 28'	Stadium: Estadio Centenario; Attendance: 46,011; Referee: Claudio Busca (Argentina)

21 July Copa del Pacífico	Peru	0–1	Chile	Lima
		Report	Soto 44'	Stadium: Estadio Nacional; Referee: Enrique Labo Revoredo (Peru)

3 August Copa del Pacífico	Chile	2–0	Peru	Arica
	Letelier 19', 67'	Report		Stadium: Estadio Carlos Dittborn; Attendance: 18,802; Referee: Juan Silvagno Cavanna (Chile)

11 August Friendly	Peru	1–1	Uruguay	Lima
	Navarro 40'	Report	Muhlethaler 28'	Stadium: Estadio Nacional; Attendance: 10,000; Referee: Sergio Leiblinger (Peru)

17 August 1983 Copa América	Peru	1–0	Colombia	Lima
	Navarro 77'	Report		Stadium: Estadio Nacional; Attendance: 30,000; Referee: José Luis Martínez Bazán (Uruguay)

21 August 1983 Copa América	Bolivia	1–1	Peru	La Paz
	Romero 65'	Report	Navarro 89'	Stadium: Estadio Hernando Siles; Attendance: 45,000; Referee: Jorge Eduardo Romero (Argentina)

28 August 1983 Copa América	Colombia	2–2	Peru	Bogotá
	Prince 46'; Fiorillo 69'	Report	Malásquez 25' (pen.); Caballero 85'	Stadium: Estadio El Campín; Attendance: 45,000; Referee: Arnaldo Cézar Coelho (Brazil)

4 September 1983 Copa América	Peru	2–1	Bolivia	Lima
	Leguía 6'; Caballero 21'	Report	Paniagua 46'	Stadium: Estadio Nacional; Attendance: 50,000; Referee: Guillermo Budge (Chile)

5 October Friendly	Peru	0–2	Paraguay	Lima
		Report	Romerito 19'; Torales 89' (pen.)	Referee: Alberto Postigo (Peru)

7 October Friendly	Paraguay	4–1	Peru	Asunción
	Cabañas 13', 36'; Romerito 20', 75'	Report	Caballero 40'

13 October 1983 Copa América - Semi-finals	Peru	0–1	Uruguay	Lima
		Report	Aguilera 62'	Stadium: Estadio Nacional; Attendance: 28,000; Referee: Sergio Vásquez (Chile)

20 October 1983 Copa América - Semi-finals	Uruguay	1–1	Peru	Montevideo
21:30 UTC−3	Cabrera 49'	Report	Malásquez 23'	Stadium: Estadio Centenario; Attendance: 56,350; Referee: Arturo Ithurralde (Argentina)

=== 1984 ===
26 February Friendly	Peru	1–3	Honduras	Lima
	Hirano 48'	Report	Uculmana 7' (o.g.); Caballero 44'; Drummond 55'	Stadium: Estadio Alejandro Villanueva; Attendance: 7,000; Referee: Edison Pérez Núñez (Peru)

2 August Friendly	Colombia	1–1	Peru	Medellín
	Knight 18' (pen.)	Report	Lobatón 62'	Stadium: Estadio Atanasio Girardot; Referee: Armando Pérez Hoyos (Colombia)

9 August Friendly	Peru	0–0	Colombia	Lima
		Report		Stadium: Estadio Nacional; Attendance: 16,000; Referee: Enrique Labo Revoredo (Peru)

19 September Friendly	Uruguay	2–0	Peru	Montevideo
21:30 UTC−3	Aguilera 6'; Salazar 89'	Report		Stadium: Estadio Centenario; Attendance: 643; Referee: Carlos Rosa Martins (Brazil)

3 October Friendly	Peru	1–3	Uruguay	Lima
	Lobatón 55'	Report	Barrios 4'; Aguilera 54'; Nadal 70'	Stadium: Estadio Nacional; Attendance: 12,121; Referee: Abel Gnecco (Argentina)

=== 1985 ===
17 February Friendly	Peru	3–0	Bolivia	Lima
	Navarro 30', 44', 70'	Report		Stadium: Estadio Nacional; Referee: Enrique Labo Revoredo (Peru)

24 February Friendly	Chile	1–2	Peru	Santiago
	Rubio 70'	Report	Velásquez 10'; Navarro 55'	Stadium: Estadio Nacional; Attendance: 61,294; Referee: Mario Lira (Chile)

27 February Friendly	Uruguay	2–2	Peru	Montevideo
21:30 UTC−3	Nadal 44'; Cabrera 90+1'	Report	Navarro 10'; Velásquez 51'	Stadium: Estadio Centenario; Attendance: 48,699; Referee: Ernesto Filippi (Uruguay)

9 March Friendly	Peru	1–1	Chile	Lima
	Hirano 30'	Report	Aravena 90+1'	Stadium: Estadio Nacional; Referee: José Ramírez Calle (Peru)

21 March Friendly	Peru	1–0	Ecuador	Lima
	Hirano 47'	Report		Attendance: 10,000; Referee: Walter Chatter (Peru)

23 April Friendly	Peru	2–1	Uruguay	Lima
20:00 UTC−5	Velásquez 26'; Cueto 75'	Report	Carrasco 24'	Stadium: Estadio Nacional; Referee: Edison Pérez Núñez (Peru)

28 April Friendly	Brazil	0–1	Peru	Brasília
		Report	Uribe 61'	Stadium: Estádio Nacional Mané Garrincha; Attendance: 65,000; Referee: Jesús Díaz (Colombia)

1 May Friendly	Bolivia	0–0	Peru	Santa Cruz de la Sierra
		Report		Stadium: Estadio Ramón Tahuichi Aguilera; Attendance: 20,000; Referee: Jorge Antequera (Bolivia)

26 May 1986 FIFA World Cup qualification	Colombia	1–0	Peru	Bogotá
	Prince 26'	Report		Stadium: Estadio El Campín; Attendance: 53,000; Referee: Luis Barrancos (Bolivia)

2 June 1986 FIFA World Cup qualification	Venezuela	0–1	Peru	San Cristóbal
		Report	Uribe 78'	Stadium: Estadio Polideportivo de Pueblo Nuevo; Attendance: 19,000; Referee: Jorge Orellana Vimos (Ecuador)

9 June 1986 FIFA World Cup qualification	Peru	0–0	Colombia	Lima
		Report		Stadium: Estadio Nacional; Attendance: 40,000; Referee: Juan Daniel Cardellino (Uruguay)

16 June 1986 FIFA World Cup qualification	Peru	4–1	Venezuela	Lima
	Navarro 15'; Barbadillo 20'; Hirano 80'; Cueto 82'	Report	Febles 29'	Stadium: Estadio Nacional; Attendance: 10,327; Referee: Luis Carlos Ferreira (Brazil)

23 June 1986 FIFA World Cup qualification	Peru	1–0	Argentina	Lima
	Oblitas 8'	Report		Stadium: Estadio Nacional; Attendance: 45,000; Referee: Hernán Silva (Chile)

30 June 1986 FIFA World Cup qualification	Argentina	2–2	Peru	Buenos Aires
	Pasculli 12'; Gareca 81'	Report	Velásquez 23'; Barbadillo 39'	Stadium: Estadio Monumental; Attendance: 65,457; Referee: Romualdo Arppi Filho (Brazil)

20 September Friendly	Mexico	0–0	Peru	Los Angeles
		Report		Attendance: 25,645; Referee: Edward Bellion (United States)

22 September Friendly	Mexico	1–0	Peru	San José
	Hermosillo 87'	Report		Referee: Robert Evans (United States)

16 October Friendly	Peru	0–1	Paraguay	Lima
		Report	Ferreira 12'	Referee: Alfonso Postigo (Peru)

27 October 1986 FIFA World Cup qualification - Play-offs	Chile	4–2	Peru	Santiago
	Aravena 6', 64' (pen.); Rubio 8'; Hisis 15'	Report	Navarro 45', 76'	Stadium: Estadio Nacional; Attendance: 40,340; Referee: José Luis Martínez Bazán (Uruguay)

3 November 1986 FIFA World Cup qualification - Play-offs	Peru	0–1	Chile	Lima
		Report	Aravena 64'	Stadium: Estadio Nacional; Attendance: 42,244; Referee: Arnaldo Cézar Coelho (Brazil)

=== 1986 ===
28 January Nehru Cup	China	3–1	Peru	Trivandrum
	Ma Lin 18', 20'; Chen Dong 22'	Report	Talavera 16'	Stadium: Greenfield International Stadium

30 January Nehru Cup	India	0–1	Peru	Trivandrum
		Report	Navarro 60'	Stadium: Greenfield International Stadium

1 April Friendly	Brazil	4–0	Peru	São Luis
	Casagrande 11', 52'; Alemão 80' (pen.); Careca 89'	Report		Stadium: Estádio Governador João Castelo; Attendance: 50,000; Referee: Arnaldo Cézar Coelho (Brazil)

=== 1987 ===
19 June Friendly	Peru	1–3	Chile	Lima
	Navarro 57'	Report	Soto 70'; Basay 72'; Zamorano 74'	Stadium: Estadio Nacional; Referee: Samuel Alarcón (Peru)

21 June Friendly	Peru	2–0	Chile	Lima
	Soto 20'; Hirano 70'	Report		Stadium: Estadio Nacional; Referee: José Ramírez Calle (Peru)

24 June Friendly	Chile	1–0	Peru	Santiago
	Hurtado 18'	Report		Stadium: Estadio Nacional; Attendance: 8,000; Referee: Guillermo Ojeda (Chile)

27 June 1987 Copa América	Argentina	1–1	Peru	Buenos Aires
	Maradona 47'	Report	Reyna 59'	Stadium: Estadio Monumental; Attendance: 40,000; Referee: Armando Pérez Hoyos (Colombia)

4 July 1987 Copa América	Peru	1–1	Ecuador	Buenos Aires
	La Rosa 87'	Report	Cuvi 72'	Stadium: Estadio Monumental; Attendance: 10,000; Referee: Asterio Martínez (Paraguay)

=== 1988 ===
21 September Friendly	Peru	0–1	Paraguay	Lima
		Report	Román 26'	Stadium: Estadio Nacional; Referee: Alberto Tejada (Peru)

25 October Copa del Pacífico	Chile	2–0	Peru	Arica
	Espinoza 39'; González 85'	Report		Stadium: Estadio Carlos Dittborn; Attendance: 7,656; Referee: Juan Torrens (Chile)

23 November Copa del Pacífico	Peru	1–1	Chile	Lima
	Farfán 58'	Report	Mardones 29'	Stadium: Estadio Nacional; Referee: Donato Barrios (Peru)

14 December Copa MUFP	Uruguay	3–0	Peru	Montevideo
21:45 UTC−3	Francescoli 13', 30'; Sosa 44'	Report		Stadium: Estadio Centenario; Attendance: 20,300; Referee: Ricardo Calabria (Argentina)

=== 1989 ===
1 February Copa Centenario	Peru	0–0	Chile	Armenia
		Report		Stadium: Estadio Centenario; Attendance: 10,024; Referee: Armando Pérez Hoyos (Colombia)

3 February Copa Centenario	Colombia	1–0	Peru	Pereira
	Higuita 72' (pen.)	Report		Stadium: Estadio Hernán Ramírez Villegas; Referee: Jesús Díaz (Colombia)

10 May Friendly	Brazil	4–1	Peru	Fortaleza
	Zé do Carmo 8'; Bebeto 22'; Charles 54', 81'	Report	Torres	Stadium: Castelão; Attendance: 72,426; Referee: Carlos Alfonso Esposito (Argentina)

15 May Friendly	Paraguay	1–1	Peru	Asunción
	Brítez 63'	Report	Requena 75' (pen.)	Stadium: Estadio Defensores del Chaco; Attendance: 20,000; Referee: Estanislao Barrientos (Paraguay)

18 May Friendly	Peru	2–1	Venezuela	Lima
	Zegarra 63'; Rey Muñoz 82'	Report	Domínguez 75'	Stadium: Estadio Nacional; Attendance: 25,000; Referee: Walter Barrios (Peru)

24 May Friendly	Peru	1–1	Brazil	Lima
	Dall'Orso 31'	Report	Cristóvão 29'	Stadium: Estadio Nacional; Attendance: 3,000; Referee: Sergio Leiblinger (Peru)

4 June Marlboro Cup	United States	3–0	Peru	East Rutherford
	Bliss 15'; Ramos 18'; Murray 44'	Report		Stadium: Giants Stadium; Attendance: 33,133; Referee: Derek Douglas (Canada)

16 June Trinidad Soccer Bowl	Trinidad and Tobago	2–1	Peru	Port of Spain
	Lewis 17'; Yorke 20'	Report	Manassero 15'	Stadium: Queen's Park Oval; Attendance: 5,000; Referee: Hubert Tromp (Aruba)

20 June Trinidad Soccer Bowl	Peru	2–1	Ecuador	Port of Spain
	Olaechea 48' (pen.); Navarro 58'	Report	Guerrero 26'	Stadium: Queen's Park Oval; Attendance: 5,000

25 June Friendly	Venezuela	3–1	Peru	San Cristóbal
	H. Rivas 55'; Febles 56'; S. Rivas 80'	Report	Rodríguez 78'	Stadium: Estadio Pueblo Nuevo; Attendance: 8,000; Referee: Arnaldo Gómez (Colombia)

1 July 1989 Copa América	Paraguay	5–2	Peru	Salvador
	Cañete 38', 84'; Neffa 41'; Mendoza 51'; del Solar 75' (o.g.)	Report	Hirano 30'; Reynoso 80'	Stadium: Estádio Fonte Nova; Attendance: 5,000; Referee: Juan Carlos Loustau (Argentina)

3 July 1989 Copa América	Brazil	0–0	Peru	Salvador
		Report		Stadium: Estádio Fonte Nova; Attendance: 8,223; Referee: Hernán Silva (Chile)

5 July 1989 Copa América	Peru	1–1	Venezuela	Salvador
	Navarro 30'	Report	Maldonado 29'	Stadium: Estádio Fonte Nova; Attendance: 2,250; Referee: Vincent Mauro (United States)

9 July 1989 Copa América	Colombia	1–1	Peru	Recife
	Iguarán 32'	Report	Hirano 43'	Stadium: Estádio do Arruda; Attendance: 60,000; Referee: Juan Carlos Loustau (Argentina)

25 July Friendly	Chile	2–1	Peru	Arica
	Tudor 42'; Aravena 61'	Report	Reynoso 86'	Stadium: Estadio Carlos Dittborn; Attendance: 10,430; Referee: Óscar Ortubé (Bolivia)

20 August 1990 FIFA World Cup qualification	Bolivia	2–1	Peru	La Paz
	Melgar 45' (pen.); Ramallo 53'	Report	del Solar 43'	Stadium: Estadio Hernando Siles; Attendance: 60,000; Referee: Armando Pérez Hoyos (Colombia)

27 August 1990 FIFA World Cup qualification	Peru	0–2	Uruguay	Lima
			Sosa 46'; Alzamendi 69'	Stadium: Estadio Nacional; Attendance: 28,000; Referee: Carlos Espósito (Argentina)

10 September 1990 FIFA World Cup qualification	Peru	1–2	Bolivia	Lima
	González 53'	Report	Montaño 45'; Sánchez 77'	Stadium: Estadio Nacional; Attendance: 8,500; Referee: Carlos Maciel (Paraguay)

24 September 1990 FIFA World Cup qualification	Uruguay	2–0	Peru	Montevideo
	Sosa 45', 58'	Report		Stadium: Estadio Centenario; Attendance: 57,000; Referee: José Roberto Wright (Brazil)

=== 1990 ===
Peru played no matches in 1990.

=== 1991 ===
6 June Friendly	Peru	0–1	Ecuador	Lima
		Report	Ron 50'	Stadium: Estadio Nacional; Referee: Fernando Chappell (Peru)

12 June Friendly	Peru	1–0	Uruguay	Lima
20:00 UTC−5	Hirano 51'	Report		Stadium: Estadio Nacional; Attendance: 16,516; Referee: José Ramírez Calle (Peru)

20 June Friendly	Uruguay	0–0	Peru	Montevideo
20:30 UTC−3		Report		Stadium: Estadio Centenario; Attendance: 1,754; Referee: Otello Roberto (Uruguay)

25 June Friendly	Ecuador	2–2	Peru	Guayaquil
	Muñoz; Carcelén	Report	Rodríguez; Hirano	Stadium: Estadio Monumental; Attendance: 16,511

6 July 1991 Copa América	Paraguay	1–0	Peru	Santiago
	Monzón 21'	Report		Stadium: Estadio Nacional; Attendance: 50,000; Referee: Óscar Ortubé (Bolivia)

8 July 1991 Copa América	Chile	4–2	Peru	Concepción
	Rubio 16'; Contreras 51' (pen.); Zamorano 61', 74'	Report	Maestri 59'; del Solar 71'	Stadium: Estadio Municipal; Attendance: 21,520; Referee: Ernesto Filippi (Uruguay)

12 July 1991 Copa América	Peru	5–1	Venezuela	Santiago
	La Rosa 9', 55'; Cavallo 21' (o.g.); del Solar 58'; Hirano 62'	Report	del Solar 14' (o.g.)	Stadium: Estadio Nacional; Attendance: 40,000; Referee: Armando Pérez Hoyos (Colombia)

14 July 1991 Copa América	Argentina	3–2	Peru	Santiago
	Latorre 3'; Craviotto 51'; García 57'	Report	Yáñez 35' (pen.); Hirano 65'	Stadium: Estadio Nacional; Attendance: 80,000; Referee: Óscar Ortubé (Bolivia)

=== 1992 ===
24 November Friendly	Peru	1–1	Ecuador	Lima
	Ramírez 49'	Report	Zambrano 5'	Stadium: Estadio Nacional; Attendance: 7,000; Referee: José Arana (Peru)

=== 1993 ===
23 January Friendly	Venezuela	0–0	Peru	Puerto Ordaz
		Report		Stadium: Polideportivo Cachamay; Attendance: 20,000; Referee: Juan José Torres (Venezuela)

27 January Friendly	Peru	1–1	Honduras	Lima
	Carranza 42'	Report	Róchez 90'	Stadium: Estadio Nacional; Attendance: 8,000; Referee: Alberto Tejada (Peru)

30 January Friendly	Peru	1–1	Belarus	Lima
	Baroni 14'	Report	Orlovsky 3'	Stadium: Estadio Nacional; Attendance: 8,000; Referee: Antonio Arnao Ortega (Peru)

3 February Friendly	Peru	0–2	Romania	Lima
		Report	Hanganu 44'; Dumitrescu 49'	Stadium: Estadio Nacional; Attendance: 10,000; Referee: Fernando Chappell (Peru)

26 May Friendly	United States	0–0	Peru	Mission Viejo
		Report		Attendance: 5,500; Referee: Arturo Angeles (United States)

30 May Friendly	Ecuador	1–0	Peru	Quito
	Fernández 24'	Report		Stadium: Estadio Olímpico Atahualpa; Attendance: 24,000; Referee: Marcos Aguas (Ecuador)

6 June Friendly	Peru	1–0	Bolivia	Lima
	González 22'	Report		Stadium: Estadio Nacional; Attendance: 24,000; Referee: Luis Seminario (Peru)

11 June Friendly	Peru	3–1	Venezuela	Arequipa
	Martínez 7'; Maestri 42', 63'	Report	Palencia 74'	Stadium: Estadio Melgar; Referee: Antonio Arnao Ortega (Peru)

18 June 1993 Copa América	Brazil	0–0	Peru	Cuenca
		Report		Stadium: Estadio Alejandro Serrano Aguilar; Attendance: 25,000; Referee: Arturo Brizio Carter (Mexico)

21 June 1993 Copa América	Paraguay	1–1	Peru	Cuenca
	Monzón 37'		del Solar 77'	Stadium: Estadio Alejandro Serrano Aguilar; Attendance: 15,000; Referee: Ángel Guevara (Ecuador)

24 June 1993 Copa América	Peru	1–0	Chile	Cuenca
	del Solar 14' (pen.)	Report		Stadium: Estadio Alejandro Serrano Aguilar; Attendance: 25,000; Referee: José Torres Cadena (Colombia)

27 June 1993 Copa América - Quarter-finals	Mexico	4–2	Peru	Quito
	García Aspe 22' (pen.), 44'; Zague 43'; Patiño 49'	Report	del Solar 55' (pen.); Reynoso 82'	Stadium: Estadio Olímpico Atahualpa; Attendance: 15,000; Referee: Iván Guerrero (Chile)

13 July Friendly	Peru	1–2	Uruguay	Lima
19:30 UTC−5	Sáenz 87'	Report	Sosa 29', 56'	Stadium: Estadio Nacional; Attendance: 16,050; Referee: Luis Seminario (Peru)

17 July Friendly	Uruguay	3–0	Peru	Montevideo
16:00 UTC−3	Morán 27'; Fonseca 9', 31'	Report		Stadium: Estadio Centenario; Attendance: 43,883; Referee: Daniel Bello (Uruguay)

1 August 1994 FIFA World Cup qualification	Peru	0–1	Argentina	Lima
		Report	Batistuta 29'	Stadium: Estadio Nacional; Attendance: 27,000; Referee: Enrique Marín (Chile)

8 August 1994 FIFA World Cup qualification	Peru	0–1	Colombia	Lima
		Report	Rincón 45'	Stadium: Estadio Nacional; Attendance: 25,000; Referee: Alfredo Rodas (Ecuador)

15 August 1994 FIFA World Cup qualification	Paraguay	2–1	Peru	Asunción
	Mendoza 14'; Chilavert 28' (pen.)	Report	del Solar 45' (pen.)	Stadium: Estadio Defensores del Chaco, Attendance: 30,500; Referee: Francisco d'Abreu (Venezuela)

22 August 1994 FIFA World Cup qualification	Argentina	2–1	Peru	Buenos Aires
	Batistuta 32'; Medina Bello 37'	Report	Palacios 66'	Stadium: Estadio Monumental Antonio Vespucio Liberti; Attendance: 70,000; Referee: Jorge Nieves (Uruguay)

29 August 1994 FIFA World Cup qualification	Colombia	4–0	Peru	Barranquilla
	Valenciano 30'; Rincón 45'; Mendoza 66'; Pérez 76'	Report		Stadium: Estadio Metropolitano Roberto Meléndez; Attendance: 70,000; Referee: Pablo Peña (Bolivia)

5 September 1994 FIFA World Cup qualification	Peru	2–2	Paraguay	Lima
	Muchotrigo 22'; Soto 77'	Report	Mendoza 61', 81'	Stadium: Estadio Nacional; Attendance: 40,000; Referee: José Luis da Rosa (Uruguay)

=== 1994 ===
3 May Miami Cup	Colombia	1–0	Peru	Miami
	Lozano 57'	Report		Stadium: Miami Orange Bowl; Attendance: 10,000; Referee: H. Díaz

5 May Miami Cup	Honduras	2–1	Peru	Miami
	Suazo 76' (pen.); Núñez 87'	Report	Aguilar 31'	Stadium: Miami Orange Bowl; Attendance: 8,000; Referee: Arturo Angeles (United States)

25 May Friendly	Chile	2–1	Peru	Santiago
	Mendoza 13'; Zamorano 44'	Report	Soto 14'	Stadium: Estadio Nacional; Attendance: 23,832; Referee: Sabino Fariñas (Paraguay)

8 June Friendly	Bolivia	0–0	Peru	Santa Cruz de la Sierra
		Report		Stadium: Estadio Ramón Tahuichi Aguilera; Attendance: 35,000; Referee: Pedro Saucedo (Bolivia)

17 August Friendly	Peru	2–0	Ecuador	Lima
	Palacios 31'; Sáenz 67'	Report		Stadium: Estadio Nacional; Attendance: 12,000; Referee: Luis Seminario (Peru)

21 September Friendly	Ecuador	0–0	Peru	Machala
		Report		Stadium: Estadio 9 de Mayo; Referee: Jorge Orellana (Ecuador)

19 October Copa Juan Parra del Riego	Peru	0–1	Uruguay	Lima
20:00 UTC−5		Report	Silva 7'	Stadium: Estadio Nacional; Attendance: 4,342; Referee: Antonio Arnao Ortega (Peru)

=== 1995 ===
5 April Copa El Inca	Uruguay	1–0	Peru	Montevideo
	Bengoechea 57'	Report		Stadium: Estadio Centenario; Attendance: 12,000; Referee: Gustavo Galesio (Uruguay)

19 April Friendly	Peru	6–0	Chile	Lima
	Maestri 2', 6', 39'; Baroni 28', 66', 77'	Report		Stadium: Estadio Nacional; Attendance: 11,853; Referee: Juan Carlos Lugones (Bolivia)

31 May Copa Municipalidad de Córdoba	Argentina	1–0	Peru	Córdoba
	Fabbri 23'			Stadium: Estadio Olímpico; Attendance: 15,000; Referee: Daniel Bello (Uruguay)

25 June Friendly	Peru	1–0	Slovakia	Lima
	Solano 57' (pen.)	Report		Stadium: Estadio Nacional; Attendance: 7,740; Referee: César Córdova Nue (Peru)

1 July Friendly	Peru	4–1	Bolivia	Lima
	Ramírez 26', 66' (pen.); Pinillos 43'; Solano 84'	Report	Sandy 17'	Stadium: Estadio Universidad San Marcos; Attendance: 6,362; Referee: José Antonio Arana (Peru)

7 July 1995 Copa América	Colombia	1–1	Peru	Rivera
	Asprilla 68'	Report	Palacios 80'	Stadium: Estadio Atilio Paiva Olivera; Attendance: 9,000; Referee: Ernesto Filippi (Uruguay)

10 July 1995 Copa América	Brazil	2–0	Peru	Rivera
	Zinho 77' (pen.); Edmundo 82'	Report		Stadium: Estadio Atilio Paiva Olivera; Attendance: 10,000; Referee: Félix Benegas (Paraguay)

13 July 1995 Copa América	Ecuador	2–1	Peru	Rivera
	Díaz 61'; Mora 75'	Report	Hurtado 82' (o.g.)	Stadium: Estadio Atilio Paiva Olivera; Attendance: 15,000; Referee: Eduardo Dluzniewski (Uruguay)

=== 1996 ===
11 February Friendly	Peru	1–3	Bolivia	Lima
	Pinillos 71' (pen.)	Report	Baldivieso 26' (pen.); Panagua 53'; Castillo 73'	Stadium: Estadio Nacional; Attendance: 10,000; Referee: José Arana (Peru)

14 February Friendly	Chile	4–0	Peru	Coquimbo
	Salas 4'; Galdames 25' (pen.); Goldberg 46', 58'	Report		Stadium: Estadio Francisco Sánchez Rumoroso; Attendance: 7,000; Referee: Luis Héctor Oliveto (Argentina)

7 March Friendly	Bolivia	2–0	Peru	Santa Cruz de la Sierra
	Coimbra 46', 51'	Report		Stadium: Estadio Ramón Tahuichi Aguilera; Attendance: 8,000; Referee: Juan Luna Humerez (Bolivia)

24 April 1998 FIFA World Cup qualification	Ecuador	4–1	Peru	Guayaquil
20:00 UTC−5	Hurtado 54', 88'; Tenorio 65'; Gavica 78'	Report	Palacios 62'	Stadium: Estadio Monumental Isidro Romero Carbo; Attendance: 60,000; Referee: Julio Matto Estoceres (Uruguay)

2 June 1998 FIFA World Cup qualification	Peru	1–1	Colombia	Lima
16:00 UTC−5	Reynoso 47'	Report	Aristizábal 60'	Stadium: Estadio Nacional; Attendance: 43,345; Referee: Alfredo Rodas (Ecuador)

19 June Friendly	Peru	4–0	Armenia	Lima
	Zegarra 24'; Farfán 56'; Palacios 58'; Solano 88' (pen.)	Report		Stadium: Estadio Nacional; Attendance: 12,000; Referee: Jorge Luis Torres Prada (Peru)

7 July 1998 FIFA World Cup qualification	Peru	0–0	Argentina	Lima
15:30 UTC−5		Report		Stadium: Estadio Nacional; Attendance: 43,675; Referee: Wilson de Souza Mendonça (Brazil)

14 August Friendly	Peru	3–0	Costa Rica	Arequipa
	Maldonado 55'; Palacios 70'; Farfán 90'	Report		Stadium: Estadio Monumental de la UNSA; Attendance: 15,000; Referee: César Córdoba Nue (Peru)

1 September 1998 FIFA World Cup qualification	Bolivia	0–0	Peru	La Paz
15:00 UTC−4		Report		Stadium: Estadio Hernando Siles; Attendance: 48,304; Referee: Oscar Alvarenga (Paraguay)

16 October Friendly	Peru	4–1	United States	Lima
	Palacios 33'; Olivares 68'; Maldonado 73'; Solano 83'	Report	Brose 43'	Stadium: Estadio Nacional; Attendance: 10,000; Referee: Juan Luna Humerez (Bolivia)

10 November 1998 FIFA World Cup qualification	Peru	4–1	Venezuela	Lima
15:30 UTC−5	Reynoso 4'; Julinho 21'; Palacios 49', 83'	Report	Díaz 78'	Stadium: Estadio Nacional; Attendance: 31,036; Referee: René Ortubé (Bolivia)

15 December 1998 FIFA World Cup qualification	Uruguay	2–0	Peru	Montevideo
21:10 UTC−3	Montero 2'; Bengoechea 38'	Report		Stadium: Estadio Centenario; Attendance: 42,630; Referee: Felipe Paez (Colombia)

=== 1997 ===
12 January 1998 FIFA World Cup qualification	Peru	2–1	Chile	Lima
20:00 UTC−5	Maestri 15'; Palacios 34'	Report	Zamorano 88'	Stadium: Estadio Nacional; Attendance: 35,373; Referee: José Varela (Uruguay)

17 January 1997 U.S. Cup	United States	0–1	Peru	San Diego
		Report	Carty 8'	Stadium: Jack Murphy Stadium; Attendance: 35,232; Referee: Arturo Brizio Carter (Mexico)

19 January 1997 U.S. Cup	Denmark	2–1	Peru	Pasadena
	Andersen 8'; Colding 81'	Report	Solano 32'	Stadium: Rose Bowl; Attendance: 15,000; Referee: Kevin Scott (United States)

22 January 1997 U.S. Cup	Mexico	0–0	Peru	Pasadena
		Report		Stadium: Rose Bowl; Attendance: 17,342; Referee: Esfandiar Baharmast (United States)

12 February 1998 FIFA World Cup qualification	Paraguay	2–1	Peru	Asunción
21:10 UTC−3	Rivarola 12'; Rojas 40'	Report	Pereda 33'	Stadium: Estadio Defensores del Chaco; Attendance: 32,000; Referee: Mario Sánchez Yanten (Chile)

2 April 1998 FIFA World Cup qualification	Peru	1–1	Ecuador	Lima
20:00 UTC−5	Palacios 58'	Report	Aguinaga 78' (pen.)	Stadium: Estadio Nacional; Attendance: 42,299; Referee: John Toro Rendón (Colombia)

30 April 1998 FIFA World Cup qualification	Colombia	0–1	Peru	Barranquilla
21:00 UTC−5		Report	Pereda 62'	Stadium: Estadio Metropolitano Roberto Meléndez; Attendance: 22,172; Referee: Márcio Rezende de Freitas (Brazil)

8 June 1998 FIFA World Cup qualification	Argentina	2–0	Peru	Buenos Aires
18:10 UTC−3	Crespo 44'; Simeone 46'	Report		Stadium: Estadio Monumental Antonio Vespucio Liberti; Attendance: 56,069; Referee: Claudio Vinicius Cerdeira (Brazil)

12 June 1997 Copa América	Peru	1–0	Uruguay	Sucre
18:05 UTC−4	Hidalgo 75'	Report		Stadium: Estadio Olímpico Patria; Attendance: 6,000; Referee: Antonio Marrufo (Mexico)

15 June 1997 Copa América	Bolivia	2–0	Peru	La Paz
	Etcheverry 45'; Baldivieso 50'	Report		Stadium: Estadio Hernando Siles; Referee: Rodrigo Badilla (Costa Rica)

18 June 1997 Copa América	Peru	2–0	Venezuela	Sucre
	Cominges 13', 59'	Report		Stadium: Estadio Olímpico Patria; Attendance: 3,500; Referee: Byron Moreno (Ecuador)

21 June 1997 Copa América - Quarter-finals	Peru	2–1	Argentina	Sucre
	Carazas 30'; Hidalgo 61'	Report	Gallardo 66' (pen.)	Stadium: Estadio Olímpico Patria; Attendance: 9,000; Referee: Byron Moreno (Ecuador)

26 June 1997 Copa América - Semi-finals	Brazil	7–0	Peru	Santa Cruz de la Sierra
	Denílson 1'; Conceição 20'; Romário 36', 49'; Leonardo 45', 55'; Djalminha 77'	Report		Stadium: Estadio Ramón Tahuichi Aguilera; Attendance: 20,000; Referee: Rodrigo Badilla (Costa Rica)

28 June 1997 Copa América - Third place	Mexico	1–0	Peru	Oruro
19:00	Hernández 82'	Report		Stadium: Estadio Jesús Bermúdez; Attendance: 8,000; Referee: Paolo Borgosano (Venezuela)

6 July 1998 FIFA World Cup qualification	Peru	2–1	Bolivia	Lima
14:30 UTC−5	Carty 9'; Soto 53'	Report	Cristaldo 56'	Stadium: Estadio Nacional; Attendance: 31,489; Referee: Wilson de Souza Mendonça (Brazil)

20 August 1998 FIFA World Cup qualification	Venezuela	0–3	Peru	Barinas
18:00 UTC−4		Report	Marengo 14'; Julinho 54'; Maestri 81'	Stadium: Estadio La Carolina; Attendance: 10,000; Referee: Peter Prendergast (Jamaica)

24 August 75th Anniversary F.P.F.	Peru	2–1	Colombia	Lima
	Pereda 25'; Farfán 38'	Report	Ramírez 28'	Stadium: Estadio Nacional; Attendance: 15,000; Referee: Víctor Mayorga (Peru)

10 September 1998 FIFA World Cup qualification	Peru	2–1	Uruguay	Lima
20:10 UTC−5	Palacios 57'; Carty 60'	Report	Recoba 43'	Stadium: Estadio Nacional; Attendance: 34,721; Referee: Esfandiar Baharmast (United States)

12 October 1998 FIFA World Cup qualification	Chile	4–0	Peru	Santiago
21:15 UTC−3	Salas 13', 82', 88'; Reyes 58'	Report		Stadium: Estadio Nacional; Attendance: 74,219; Referee: Márcio Rezende de Freitas (Brazil)

16 November 1998 FIFA World Cup qualification	Peru	1–0	Paraguay	Lima
15:00 UTC−5	Soto 37'	Report		Stadium: Estadio Nacional; Attendance: 30,000; Referee: Francisco Mourao Dacildo (Brazil)

=== 1998 ===
15 April Friendly	Mexico	1–0	Peru	Los Angeles
	Hernández 76' (pen.)	Report		Stadium: Memorial Coliseum; Attendance: 22,650; Referee: Arturo Angeles (United States)

10 October Friendly	Netherlands	2–0	Peru	Eindhoven
	Stam 58'; van Vossen 75'	Report		Stadium: Philips Stadion; Attendance: 10,000; Referee: Fritz Stuchlik (Austria)

=== 1999 ===
10 February Friendly	Peru	1–2	Ecuador	Lima
	Mendoza 38'	Report	Hurtado 67', 76'	Stadium: Estadio Nacional; Attendance: 10,000; Referee: Ángel Ziani (Peru)

17 February Friendly	Ecuador	1–2	Peru	Guayaquil
	Chalá 68'		Pizarro 28'; Mendoza 48'	Stadium: Estadio Monumental Isidro Romero Carbo; Attendance: 15,000; Referee: Roddy Zambrano (Ecuador)

30 May 1999 Kirin Cup Soccer	Belgium	1–1	Peru	Kyoto
	Tanghe 23'	Report	Maestri 7'	Stadium: Nishikyogoku Stadium; Attendance: 9,262; Referee: Naotsugu Fuse (Japan)

6 June 1999 Kirin Cup Soccer	Japan	0–0	Peru	Yokohama
		Report		Stadium: International Stadium; Attendance: 67,354; Referee: Panya Hanlumyaung (Thailand)

17 June Friendly	Colombia	3–3	Peru	Manizales
	Asprilla 71', 85'; Ballesteros 92'	Report	Solano 36'; Holsen 44'; Pizarro 56'	Stadium: Estadio Palogrande; Attendance: 30,000; Referee: Jhon Jairo Toro (Colombia)

20 June Friendly	Venezuela	3–0	Peru	Valencia
	Tortolero 28'; Rey 41'; de Ornelas 62'	Report		Stadium: Estadio Misael Delgado; Attendance: 20,000; Referee: José Arana (Peru)

23 June Friendly	Peru	3–0	Venezuela	Lima
	Pizarro 58'; Soto 67'; Solano 78'	Report		Stadium: Estadio Alejandro Villanueva; Attendance: 20,000; Referee: Paolo Borgosano (Venezuela)

29 June 1999 Copa América	Peru	3–2	Japan	Asunción
18:15	Jorge Soto 70'; Holsen 74', 81'	Report	Lopes 6'; Miura 77'	Stadium: Estadio Defensores del Chaco; Attendance: 38,000; Referee: Byron Moreno (Ecuador)

2 July 1999 Copa América	Peru	1–0	Bolivia	Asunción
19:05	Zúñiga 87'	Report		Stadium: Estadio Defensores del Chaco; Attendance: 30,000; Referee: Luis Solórzano (Venezuela)

5 July 1999 Copa América	Paraguay	1–0	Peru	Pedro Juan Caballero
21:05	Santa Cruz 88'	Report		Stadium: Monumental Río Parapití; Attendance: 8,000; Referee: Óscar Ruiz (Colombia)

10 July 1999 Copa América - Quarter-finals	Peru	3–3 (2–4 p)	Mexico	Asunción
15:05	Palacios 5'; Pereda 15'; Solano 40'	Report	Hernández 29', 33' (pen.); Torrado 88'	Stadium: Estadio Defensores del Chaco; Attendance: 32,000; Referee: Wilson de Souza (Brazil)
	Penalties
	Solano (penalty scored); Jorge Soto (penalty scored); José Soto (penalty missed); Reynoso (penalty missed)		(penalty scored) Suárez; (penalty scored) Terrazas; (penalty scored) R. García; (penalty scored) Zepeda

17 November Friendly	Peru	2–1	Slovakia	Lima
	Palacios 22'; Solano 37'	Report	Kožuch 18'	Stadium: Estadio Nacional; Attendance: 29,089; Referee: Eduardo Gamboa (Chile)

1 December Friendly	Peru	0–0	Honduras	Lima
		Report		Stadium: Estadio Nacional; Attendance: 10,000; Referee: Luis Peña (Chile)

== See also ==
- Peru national football team results (2000–2019)
- Peru national football team results (2020–present)

== Notes ==
1. This is the worst defeat ever recorded by the Peruvian national team.
2. This match was played to commemorate the 75th anniversary of the Peruvian Football Federation. It also served as a farewell for César Cueto, who played for the national team for the last time at age 45.
