= 1986 FIFA World Cup qualification (CONMEBOL) =

Listed below are the dates and results for the 1986 FIFA World Cup qualification rounds for the South American zone (CONMEBOL). For an overview of the qualification rounds, see the article 1986 FIFA World Cup qualification.

A total of 10 CONMEBOL teams entered the competition. The South American zone was allocated 4 places (out of 24) in the final tournament.

South America's qualifying berths were taken by Argentina, Uruguay, Brazil and Paraguay.

== Tournament structure ==
The ten teams were divided into three groups. The teams played against each other on a home-and-away basis. The number of teams and spots for each group were as follows:

- Group 1 had four teams. The group winner qualified directly, while the runner-up and third-placed team advanced to the CONMEBOL Play-offs.
- Groups 2 and 3 had three teams each. The group winner qualified directly, while the runner-up advanced to the CONMEBOL play-offs.

In the play-offs, the four teams played a in knockout tournament, with matches on a home-and-away basis. The tournament winner qualified.

Key to colours in group tables
Team qualifies for the World Cup
Team advances to the play-offs

== Group stage ==
=== Group 1 ===
Team	Pld	W	D	L	GF	GA	GD	Pts
Argentina	6	4	1	1	12	6	+6	9
Peru	6	3	2	1	8	4	+4	8
Colombia	6	2	2	2	6	6	0	6
Venezuela	6	0	1	5	5	15	−10	1

	(Argentina)	(Colombia)	(Peru)	(Venezuela)
Argentina	–	1–0	2–2	3–0
Colombia	1–3	–	1–0	2–0
Peru	1–0	0–0	–	4–1
Venezuela	2–3	2–2	0–1	–

=== Group 2 ===
Team	Pld	W	D	L	GF	GA	GD	Pts
Uruguay	4	3	0	1	6	4	+2	6
Chile	4	2	1	1	10	5	+5	5
Ecuador	4	0	1	3	4	11	−7	1

	(Chile)	(Ecuador)	(Uruguay)
Chile	–	6–2	2–0
Ecuador	1–1	–	0–2
Uruguay	2–1	2–1	–

=== Group 3 ===
Team	Pld	W	D	L	GF	GA	GD	Pts
Brazil	4	2	2	0	6	2	+4	6
Paraguay	4	1	2	1	5	4	+1	4
Bolivia	4	0	2	2	2	7	−5	2

	(Bolivia)	(Brazil)	(Paraguay)
Bolivia	–	0–2	1–1
Brazil	1–1	–	1–1
Paraguay	3–0	0–2	–

== Play-offs ==
=== First round ===
Team 1	Agg.	Team 2	1st leg	2nd leg
Paraguay	4–2	Colombia	3–0	1–2
Chile	5–2	Peru	4–2	1–0

==== First leg ====
27 October 1985

Paraguay	3 – 0	Colombia
Hicks 15'; Romerito 70' (pen.); Cabañas 79'	Report

Estadio Defensores del Chaco, Asunción
Attendance: 40,000
Referee: Carlos Espósito (Argentina)

27 October 1985

Chile	4 – 2	Peru
Aravena 6', 64' (pen.); Rubio 8'; Hisis 15'	Report	Navarro 45', 76'

Estadio Nacional de Chile, Santiago
Attendance: 40,340
Referee: José Luis Martínez Bazán (Uruguay)

==== Second leg ====
3 November 1985

Colombia	2 – 1	Paraguay
Angulo 66'; Ortiz 88'	Report	Ferreira 57'

Pascual Guerrero, Cali
Attendance: 6,000
Referee: José Roberto Wright (Brazil)

Paraguay won 4–2 on aggregate and advanced to the Final Round.

3 November 1985

Peru	0 – 1	Chile
	Report	Aravena 64'

Estadio Nacional, Lima
Attendance: 42,244
Referee: Arnaldo Cézar Coelho (Brazil)

Chile won 5–2 on aggregate and advanced to the Final Round.

=== Final round ===
Team 1	Agg.	Team 2	1st leg	2nd leg
Paraguay	5–2	Chile	3–0	2–2

==== First leg ====
10 November 1985

Paraguay	3 – 0	Chile
Cabañas 9'; Delgado 46'; Garrido 85' (o.g.)	Report

Estadio Defensores del Chaco, Asunción
Attendance: 60,000
Referee: Arnaldo Cézar Coelho (Brazil)

==== Second leg ====
17 November 1985

Chile	2 – 2	Paraguay
Rubio 13'; Muñoz 80'	Report	Schettina 22'; Romerito 39'

Estadio Nacional de Chile, Santiago
Attendance: 62,000
Referee: Juan Daniel Cardellino (Uruguay)

Paraguay won 5–2 on aggregate and qualified for the World Cup.

== Qualified teams ==
The following four teams from CONMEBOL qualified for the final tournament.

Team	Qualified as	Qualified on	Previous appearances in FIFA World Cup^{1}
Argentina	Group 1 winners	30 June 1985	8 (1930, 1934, 1958, 1962, 1966, 1974, **1978**, 1982)
Uruguay	Group 2 winners	7 April 1985	7 (**1930**, **1950**, 1954, 1962, 1966, 1970, 1974)
Brazil	Group 3 winners	30 June 1985	12 (1930, 1934, 1938, 1950, 1954, **1958**, **1962**, 1966, **1970**, 1974, 1978, 1982)
Paraguay	Final round winners	17 November 1985	3 (1930, 1950, 1958)

^{1} Bold indicates champions for that year. Italic indicates hosts for that year.

== Goalscorers ==
7 goals

- (Chile) Jorge Aravena

4 goals

- (Paraguay) Romerito

3 goals

- (Argentina) Diego Maradona
- (Argentina) Pedro Pasculli
- (Chile) Hugo Rubio
- (Peru) Franco Navarro

2 goals

- (Brazil) Walter Casagrande
- (Chile) Carlos Caszely
- (Chile) Alejandro Hisis
- (Colombia) Hernán Darío Herrera
- (Colombia) Willington Ortiz
- (Colombia) Miguel Augusto Prince
- (Ecuador) Fernando Baldeón
- (Paraguay) Roberto Cabañas
- (Peru) Gerónimo Barbadillo
- (Uruguay) Venancio Ramos

1 goal

- (Argentina) Jorge Burruchaga
- (Argentina) Néstor Clausen
- (Argentina) Ricardo Gareca
- (Argentina) Daniel Passarella
- (Argentina) Miguel Ángel Russo
- (Argentina) Jorge Valdano
- (Bolivia) Silvio Rojas
- (Bolivia) Juan Carlos Sánchez
- (Brazil) Careca
- (Brazil) Sócrates
- (Brazil) Zico
- (Chile) Juan Carlos Letelier
- (Chile) Jorge Muñoz
- (Chile) Héctor Puebla
- (Colombia) Manuel Asisclo Cordoba
- (Colombia) Sergio Angulo
- (Ecuador) Hamilton Cuvi Rivera
- (Ecuador) Hans Maldonado
- (Paraguay) Rogelio Delgado
- (Paraguay) Buenaventura Ferreira
- (Paraguay) Ramón Hicks
- (Paraguay) Justo Jacquet
- (Paraguay) Alfredo Mendoza
- (Paraguay) Jorge Martín Núñez
- (Paraguay) Vladimiro Schettina
- (Peru) César Cueto
- (Peru) Jorge Hirano
- (Peru) Juan Carlos Oblitas
- (Peru) Julio César Uribe
- (Peru) José Manuel Velásquez
- (Uruguay) Carlos Aguilera
- (Uruguay) José Batista
- (Uruguay) Enzo Francescoli
- (Uruguay) Mario Saralegui
- (Venezuela) Bernardo Añor
- (Venezuela) Douglas Cedeño
- (Venezuela) Pedro Febles
- (Venezuela) Herbert Marquez
- (Venezuela) René Torres

1 own goal

- (Bolivia) Miguel Ángel Noro (playing against Brazil)
- (Chile) Lizardo Garrido (playing against Paraguay)

== See also ==
- 1986 FIFA World Cup qualification (UEFA)
- 1986 FIFA World Cup qualification (CONCACAF)
- 1986 FIFA World Cup qualification (CAF)
- 1986 FIFA World Cup qualification (AFC)
- 1986 FIFA World Cup qualification (OFC)
