= 1986 FIFA World Cup qualification – CONMEBOL Group 1 =

Football tournament qualification stage

The 1986 FIFA World Cup qualification CONMEBOL Group 1 was a CONMEBOL qualifying group for the 1986 FIFA World Cup. The group comprised Argentina, Colombia, Peru and Venezuela.

The group was won by Argentina, who qualified for the 1986 FIFA World Cup. Peru and Colombia entered the CONMEBOL play-off stage.

== Standings ==
Team	Pld	W	D	L	GF	GA	GD	Pts
Argentina	6	4	1	1	12	6	+6	9
Peru	6	3	2	1	8	4	+4	8
Colombia	6	2	2	2	6	6	+0	6
Venezuela	6	0	1	5	5	15	−10	1

== Results ==
26 May 1985

Colombia	1–0	Peru
Prince 26'	Report

Estadio El Campín, Bogotá
Attendance: 53,000
Referee: Luis Barrancos (Bolivia)

26 May 1985

Venezuela	2–3	Argentina
Torres 8'; Márquez 58'	Report	Maradona 2', 57'; Passarella 42'

Estadio Polideportivo de Pueblo Nuevo, San Cristóbal
Attendance: 30,000
Referee: Juan Daniel Cardellino (Uruguay)

2 June 1985

Colombia	1–3	Argentina
Prince 61'	Report	Pasculli 43', 68'; Burruchaga 85'

Estadio El Campín, Bogotá
Attendance: 58,000
Referee: Arnaldo Cézar Coelho (Brazil)

2 June 1985

Venezuela	0–1	Peru
	Report	Uribe 78'

Estadio Polideportivo de Pueblo Nuevo, San Cristóbal
Attendance: 19,000
Referee: Jorge Orellana Vimos (Ecuador)

9 June 1985

Peru	0–0	Colombia
	Report

Estadio Nacional, Lima
Attendance: 40,000
Referee: Juan Daniel Cardellino (Uruguay)

9 June 1985

Argentina	3–0	Venezuela
Russo 27'; Clausen 88'; Maradona 90'	Report

Estadio Monumental, Buenos Aires
Attendance: 35,000
Referee: Gastón Castro (Chile)

16 June 1985

Peru	4–1	Venezuela
Navarro 15'; Barbadillo 20'; Hirano 80'; Cueto 82'	Report	Febles 29'

Estadio Nacional, Lima
Attendance: 10,327
Referee: Luis Carlos Ferreira (Brazil)

16 June 1985

Argentina	1–0	Colombia
Valdano 25'	Report

Estadio Monumental, Buenos Aires
Attendance: 40,000
Referee: Gabriel González Roa (Paraguay)

23 June 1985

Venezuela	2–2	Colombia
Cedeño 6'; Añor 64'	Report	Ortiz 16'; Herrera 50' (pen.)

Estadio Polideportivo de Pueblo Nuevo, San Cristóbal
Attendance: 30,000
Referee: Ramón Barreto Ruiz (Uruguay)

23 June 1985

Peru	1–0	Argentina
Oblitas 8'	Report

Estadio Nacional, Lima
Attendance: 45,000
Referee: Hernán Silva Arce (Chile)

30 June 1985

Colombia	2–0	Venezuela
Córdoba 15'; Herrera 28' (pen.)	Report

Estadio El Campín, Bogotá
Attendance: 35,000
Referee: Victor Vasquez Sanchez (Chile)

30 June 1985

Argentina	2–2	Peru
Pasculli 12'; Gareca 81'	Report	Velásquez 23'; Barbadillo 39'

Estadio Monumental, Buenos Aires
Attendance: 65,457
Referee: Romualdo Arppi Filho (Brazil)
