= 1986 FIFA World Cup qualification – CONMEBOL Group 3 =

Football tournament qualification stage

The 1986 FIFA World Cup qualification CONMEBOL Group 3 was a CONMEBOL qualifying group for the 1986 FIFA World Cup. The group comprised Bolivia, Brazil and Paraguay.

The group was won by Brazil, who qualified for the 1986 FIFA World Cup. Runners up were Paraguay who entered the CONMEBOL play-off stage.

== Standings ==
Team	Pld	W	D	L	GF	GA	GD	Pts
Brazil	4	2	2	0	6	2	+4	6
Paraguay	4	1	2	1	5	4	+1	4
Bolivia	4	0	2	2	2	7	−5	2

== Results ==
26 May 1985

Bolivia	1–1	Paraguay
Rojas 9'	Report	Nunes 82'

Estadio Ramón Tahuichi Aguilera, Santa Cruz
Attendance: 20,000
Referee: Elías Jácome Guerrero (Ecuador)

2 June 1985

Bolivia	0–2	Brazil
	Report	Casagrande 56'; Noro 59' (o.g.)

Estadio Ramón Tahuichi Aguilera, Santa Cruz
Attendance: 24,900
Referee: Jorge Romero (Argentina)

9 June 1985

Paraguay	3–0	Bolivia
Mendoza 17'; Jacquet 34'; Romerito 48'	Report

Estadio Defensores del Chaco, Asunción
Attendance: 40,000
Referee: Gilberto Aristizábal (Colombia)

16 June 1985

Paraguay	0–2	Brazil
	Report	Casagrande 26'; Zico 69'

Estadio Defensores del Chaco, Asunción
Attendance: 55,000
Referee: Gastón Castro (Chile)

23 June 1985

Brazil	1–1	Paraguay
Sócrates 25'	Report	Romerito 40'

Estádio do Maracanã, Rio de Janeiro
Attendance: 139,923
Referee: José Luis Martínez Bazán (Uruguay)

30 June 1985

Brazil	1–1	Bolivia
Careca 19'	Report	Sánchez 74'

Estádio do Morumbi, São Paulo
Attendance: 90,709
Referee: Enrique Labo Revoredo (Peru)
