= Bernardo Añor =

Bernardo Añor may refer to:

- Bernardo Añor (footballer, born 1959) (born 1959), Venezuelan footballer
- Bernardo Añor (footballer, born 1988) (born 1988), Venezuelan footballer
