= 1986 FIFA World Cup qualification – CONMEBOL Group 2 =

Football tournament qualification stage

The 1986 FIFA World Cup qualification CONMEBOL Group 2 was a CONMEBOL qualifying group for the 1986 FIFA World Cup. The group comprised Chile, Ecuador, and Uruguay.

The group was won by Uruguay, who qualified for the 1986 FIFA World Cup. Runners up were Chile, who entered the CONMEBOL play-off stage.

== Standings ==
Team	Pld	W	D	L	GF	GA	GD	Pts
Uruguay	4	3	0	1	6	4	+2	6
Chile	4	2	1	1	10	5	+5	5
Ecuador	4	0	1	3	4	11	−7	1

== Results ==
3 March 1985

Ecuador	1 – 1	Chile
Maldonado 43' (pen.)	Report	Letelier 31'

Estadio Olímpico Atahualpa, Quito
Attendance: 50,000
Referee: José Roberto Wright (Brazil)

10 March 1985

Uruguay	2 – 1	Ecuador
Aguilera 32'; Ramos 90'	Report	Cuvi 54'

Estadio Centenario, Montevideo
Attendance: 60,000
Referee: Edison Pérez Núñez (Peru)

17 March 1985

Chile	6 – 2	Ecuador
Puebla 21'; Caszely 29', 40'; Hisis 34'; Aravena 51', 89'	Report	Baldeón 23', 37'

Estadio Nacional de Chile, Santiago
Attendance: 75,000
Referee: Orazio Di Rosa Giunta (Venezuela)

24 March 1985

Chile	2 – 0	Uruguay
Rubio 28'; Aravena 53'	Report

Estadio Nacional de Chile, Santiago
Attendance: 80,000
Referee: Jesús Diaz Palacio (Colombia)

31 March 1985

Ecuador	0 – 2	Uruguay
	Report	Saralegui 70'; Francescoli 87'

Estadio Olímpico Atahualpa, Quito
Attendance: 45,000
Referee: Juan Escobar Veldez (Paraguay)

7 April 1985

Uruguay	2 – 1	Chile
Batista 9'; Ramos 60' (pen.)	Report	Aravena 29' (pen.)

Estadio Centenario, Montevideo
Attendance: 75,000
Referee: Carlos Espósito (Argentina)
