= Miguel Vargas (footballer, born 1969) =

Chilean footballer

Personal information
- Full name: Miguel Alejandro Vargas Soto
- Date of birth: 15 May 1969 (age 57)
- Place of birth: Santiago, Chile
- Height: 1.72 m (5 ft 8 in)
- Position: Midfielder

Team information
- Current team: Colo-Colo (youth manager)

Youth career
- Colo-Colo

Senior career*
Years	Team	Apps	(Gls)
1987–1995	Colo-Colo	20	(0)
1987	→ Rangers (loan)	29	(1)
1989	→ Rangers (loan)	25	(3)
1991	→ Audax Italiano (loan)		(4)
1992	→ Deportes Antofagasta (loan)	11	(0)
1993	→ Magallanes (loan)		(2)
1994	→ Coquimbo Unido (loan)	9	(0)
1996	Unión Española	17	(0)
1997	Palestino	24	(1)
1998	Santiago Morning		(0)
1999–2000	OFI	12	(0)
Total			(11)

Managerial career
- 2019–: Colo-Colo (youth)
- * Club domestic league appearances and goals

Miguel Alejandro Vargas Soto (born 15 May 1969) is a Chilean former professional footballer who played as a midfielder for clubs in Chile and Greece.

== PLaying career ==
A product of Colo-Colo youth system, Vargas took part of the first team thanks to the coach Arturo Salah and made five appearances in 1988 in the league, as well as in the Copa Libertadores. He also was with them in the 1995 season. In both the 1987 and 1989 seasons, he played on loan at Rangers de Talca.

In the Chilean Primera División, he also played for Deportes Antofagasta (1992), Coquimbo Unido (1994), Unión Española (1996) and Palestino.

In the Chilean Segunda División, he played for Audax Italiano (1991), Magallanes (1993) and Santiago Morning (1998).

Abroad, he played for OFI in the Alpha Ethniki from 1999 to 2000, becoming the third Chilean to play for the club after Alejandro Hisis and Jaime Vera.

== Coaching career ==
Vargas began his career as coach at the Colo-Colo academies and works for the Colo-Colo youth system since 2019.
