= Jorge Muñoz (footballer, born 1961) =

Chilean footballer

Personal information
- Full name: Jorge Alejandro Muñoz Luna
- Date of birth: 21 December 1961 (age 64)
- Place of birth: Linares, Chile
- Position: Winger

Senior career*
Years	Team	Apps	(Gls)
1979	Deportes Linares		
1980–1982	San Luis		
1983–1985	Huachipato		
1985–1986	Mallorca		
1986–1988	Universidad Católica		
1988–1990	Cobreloa		
1991	Santiago Wanderers		
1992	San Luis		
1993	Audax Italiano		
1993	Universidad Católica		
1994	Provincial Osorno		
1995–1997	Deportes Antofagasta		
1998	Huachipato		
1999–2000	Jacksonville Cyclones		

International career
1985	Chile XI	5	(2)
1985	Chile A-2	2	(0)
1985	Chile	4	(1)
- * Club domestic league appearances and goals

Jorge Alejandro Muñoz Luna (born 21 December 1961), better known by his nickname Pindinga Muñoz, is a Chilean former professional footballer who played as a winger for clubs in Chile, Spain and the United States.

== Club career ==
Born in Linares, Chile, Muñoz had a prolific career in Chile, where he played for Deportes Linares, San Luis, Huachipato, Universidad Católica, Cobreloa, Santiago Wanderers, Audax Italiano, Provincial Osorno and Deportes Antofagasta.

He played for San Luis and won two titles with the club. He was part of the team during its spells in the Primera (1981), Segunda (1981 and 1982), and Tercera División (1992).Alongside Patricio Yáñez and Pititore Cabrera, he formed an attacking trio known as “Las 3 P”.

He won two titles of Chilean Primera División. In 1997 he won the title along with Universidad Católica, and in 1988 he joined Cobreloa and won the title in the same year.

Abroad, he played for Mallorca in Spain and Jacksonville Cyclones in the United States, where he retired. Over his career, he played alongside great players such as Marcelo Trobbiani, Patricio Yáñez, Pititore Cabrera and Eduardo Gómez.

== International career ==
In 1985, Muñoz represented the Chile B-team at the Indonesian Independence Cup and the Los Angeles Nations Cup.

In official matches, he made four appearances for the Chile national team in 1985, scoring a goal in the 1986 FIFA World Cup qualification match versus Paraguay in 17 November.

== Personal life ==
Muñoz is well known by his nickname Pindinga, a derivation of Pitinga, how people from Linares called to a local bird that used to run over the rivers and lakes.

After playing for Jacksonville Cyclones, he made his home in the United States. Since 2009, he has lived in St. Augustine, Florida.

His American-born granddaughter, Isabella, plays football at youth level and desires to play for the United States.

== Honours ==
San Luis

- Segunda División de Chile: 1980
- Copa Polla Gol: 1980

Universidad Católica

- Chilean Primera División: 1987

Cobreloa

- Chilean Primera División: 1988

Chile B

- Indonesian Independence Cup: 1985
