= Juanpi =

Venezuelan footballer (born 1994)

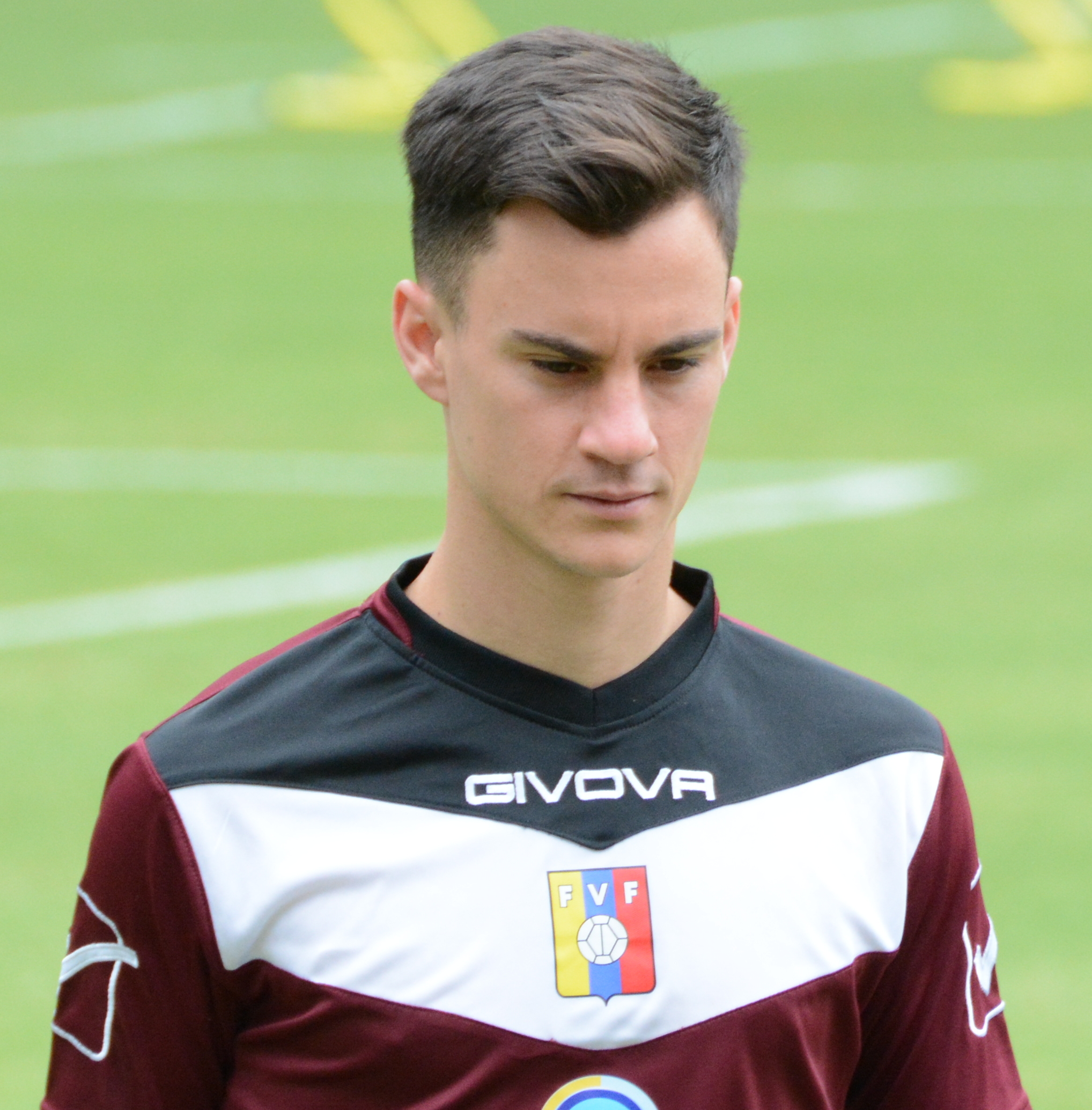
- Juanpi with Venezuela in 2019

Personal information
- Full name: Juan Pablo Añor Acosta
- Date of birth: 24 January 1994 (age 32)
- Place of birth: Caracas, Venezuela
- Height: 1.76 m (5 ft 9 in)
- Position: Attacking midfielder

Team information
- Current team: Alajuelense
- Number: 10

Youth career
- 2005–2008: Loyola
- 2008–2009: Caracas
- 2009–2014: Málaga

Senior career*
Years	Team	Apps	(Gls)
2013–2014	Málaga B	36	(11)
2014–2020	Málaga	121	(8)
2019	→ Huesca (loan)	14	(2)
2020–2021	Al-Ain	18	(5)
2022	Caracas	16	(4)
2023–2024	Panetolikos	38	(2)
2024–2025	Caracas	12	(2)
2025–2026	Volos	43	(7)
2026–	Alajuelense	0	(0)

International career^{‡}
2011	Venezuela U17	3	(0)
2013	Venezuela U20	2	(1)
2014–	Venezuela	28	(1)
- * Club domestic league appearances and goals as of 17 May 2026 ‡ National team caps and goals as of 23:13, 10 October 2025 (UTC).

Juan Pablo Añor Acosta (born 24 January 1994), commonly known as Juanpi, is a Venezuelan professional footballer who plays as an attacking midfielder for Alajuelense and the Venezuela national team.

He played 146 games and scored 11 goals for Málaga in Spain, in four La Liga seasons and three in Segunda División, while also playing on loan in the top flight for Huesca. He represented Venezuela at the Copa América in 2016 and 2019.

== Club career ==
Born in Caracas, Juanpi joined Málaga CF's youth system in 2009, aged 15, from hometown club Caracas FC. He spent several seasons in the Juvenil squad and was promoted to the reserves in the 2013–14 campaign, appearing regularly in Tercera División.

Juanpi made his first-team – and La Liga – debut on 29 August 2014, replacing Luis Alberto in the 75th minute of a 0–3 loss at Valencia CF. On 19 December he signed a new contract until 2018, and scored his first professional goal on 6 January of the following year, netting the first in a 2−0 Copa del Rey home win against Levante UD.

Juanpi scored his first league goal on 23 January 2016, netting the equalizer in a 1–2 home loss against FC Barcelona. Seven days later he added another, netting the first in a 2–1 win at SD Eibar, and scored four goals during the campaign.

Juanpi switched from 28 to number 10 shirt ahead of the 2016–17 campaign, and scored the Andalusians' first goal of the competition, in a 1–1 home draw against CA Osasuna.

On 31 January 2019, Juanpi was loaned to SD Huesca in the top tier, until June. He was released by Málaga on 3 October of the following year, along with seven other first team players, due to a layoff.

On 11 October 2020, Juanpi was signed to Al-Ain FC in the Saudi Professional League. He returned to Caracas FC on 27 June 2022.

== International career ==
After appearing with the under-17 team at the 2011 South American Under-17 Championship, Juanpi was also a part of the squad selected for the 2013 South American Youth Championship, hosted in Argentina. On 29 January 2013 he was also called up to the main squad.

Juanpi made his full international debut on 14 November 2014, replacing Frank Feltscher in the 58th minute of a 0–5 loss against Chile at the Estadio CAP in Talcahuano. He played one game for the Vinotinto at the Copa América Centenario in the United States, as a substitute in the 4–1 quarter-final loss to Argentina, and on 6 September 2016 he scored his first international goal to open a 2–2 home draw with the same opponent in 2018 FIFA World Cup qualification.

Juanpi was also called up for the 2019 Copa América in Brazil. He played one match, a 3–1 win over Bolivia in Belo Horizonte that advanced the team to the quarterfinals.

== Personal life ==
Juanpi's father, Bernardo Añor, was also a footballer, as was his older brother, also named Bernardo. All three relatives played for Caracas.

== Career statistics ==
=== Club ===
As of 1 November 2025

Club	Season	League			Cup		Continental		Other		Total	
Club	Season	Division	Apps	Goals	Apps	Goals	Apps	Goals	Apps	Goals	Apps	Goals
Málaga	2014–15	La Liga	5	0	5	1	—		—		10	1
Málaga	2015–16	La Liga	29	4	1	0	—		—		30	4
Málaga	2016–17	La Liga	22	2	2	0	—		—		24	2
Málaga	2017-18	La Liga	16	0	1	0	—		—		17	0
Málaga	2018-19	Segunda División	15	1	1	0	—		—		16	1
Málaga	2019-20	Segunda División	34	1	1	0	—		—		35	1
Málaga	Total		121	8	11	1	—		—		132	9
Huesca (loan)	2018-19	La Liga	14	2	—		—		—		14	2
Al-Ain	2020-21	Saudi Pro League	18	5	2	0	—		—		20	5
Caracas	2022	Liga Venezolana	16	4	—		—		—		16	4
Panetolikos	2022-23	Super League Greece	3	0	—		—		6 (Note: Appearances in Super League Greece Play-out)	1	9	1
Panetolikos	2023-24	Super League Greece	23	0	4	1	—		6	1	33	2
Panetolikos	Total		26	0	4	1	—		12	2	51	3
Caracas	2024	Liga FUTVE	12	2	—		—		—		12	2
Volos	2024–25	Super League Greece	5	1	—		—		9	2	14	3
Volos	2025–26	Super League Greece	9	2	2	0	—		0	0	11	2
Volos	Total		14	3	2	0	—		9	2	25	5
Career Total			230	24	19	2	—		21	4	270	30

=== International ===
As of match played 10 October 2025

Appearances and goals by national team and year
National team	Year	Apps	Goals
Venezuela	2014	1	0
Venezuela	2016	10	1
Venezuela	2017	1	0
Venezuela	2019	9	0
Venezuela	2020	1	0
Venezuela	2022	4	0
Venezuela	2025	2	0
Total		28	1

Scores and results list Venezuela's goal tally first, score column indicates score after each Juanpi goal

List of international goals scored by Juanpi
No.	Date	Venue	Opponent	Score	Result	Competition
1.	6 September 2016	Estadio Metropolitano de Mérida, Mérida, Venezuela	Argentina	1–0	2–2	2018 World Cup qualification
