= Víctor Mendoza =

Ecuadorian footballer (1963–2026)

Personal information
- Full name: Victor Eduardo Mendoza Cevallos
- Date of birth: 24 August 1963
- Place of birth: Portoviejo, Ecuador
- Date of death: 6 June 2026 (aged 62)
- Position: Goalkeeper

International career
Years	Team	Apps	(Gls)
1989–1993	Ecuador	4	(0)

Victor Eduardo Mendoza Cevallos (24 August 1963 – 6 June 2026) was an Ecuadorian footballer who played as a goalkeeper. He made four appearances for the Ecuador national team from 1989 to 1993. He was also part of Ecuador's squad for the 1989 Copa América tournament.

Mendoza died on 6 June 2026, at the age of 62, after complications of heart, kidney and lung conditions.
