= William Pacheco =

Venezuelan footballer (born 1962)

Personal information
- Date of birth: 18 April 1962 (age 64)

International career
Years	Team	Apps	(Gls)
1989–1991	Venezuela	12	(0)

William Pacheco (born 18 April 1962) is a Venezuelan footballer. He played in twelve matches for the Venezuela national football team from 1989 to 1991. He was also part of Venezuela's squad for the 1989 Copa América tournament.
