= Ricardo Zegarra =

Peruvian footballer (born 1966)

Personal information
- Full name: Ricardo Jesús Zegarra Mendoza
- Date of birth: 30 April 1966 (age 60)
- Place of birth: Lima, Peru
- Height: 1.80 m (5 ft 11 in)
- Position: Forward

Senior career*
Years	Team	Apps	(Gls)
1987–1988	Coronel Bolognesi		
1989–1992	Defensor Lima		
1993	FBC Melgar		
1994	Universitario		
1995	Cienciano	27	(3)
1996	Sporting Cristal	14	(3)
1997	Alianza Atlético	29	(17)
1998	FBC Melgar	16	(4)
1999	Unión Minas	10	(0)
2000	Deportivo Wanka		

International career
1989–1996	Peru	3	(1)
- * Club domestic league appearances and goals

Ricardo Jesús Zegarra Mendoza (born on 30 April 1966) is a Peruvian professional footballer who played as forward.

== Playing career ==
=== Club career ===
Arriving from Coronel Bolognesi, Ricardo Zegarra joined Defensor Lima in 1989 and won his first title, the Torneo Plácido Galindo, a tournament featuring first-division teams, created in honor of Plácido Galindo, a former player and football administrator.

After a stint at Universitario de Deportes in 1994, he moved to Sporting Cristal in 1996 and won the Peruvian championship under Sergio Markarián. He also played three matches in the 1996 Copa Libertadores, scoring twice.

The following year, he joined Alianza Atlético, where he finished as the top scorer in the 1997 Peruvian championship with 17 goals. He ended his career at Deportivo Wanka in 2000.

=== International career ===
Peruvian international Ricardo Zegarra made three appearances for the national team between 1989 and 1996. He scored his only international goal, opening the scoring in a friendly match against Venezuela on 18 May 1989 (2–1 victory).

== Honours ==
Defensor Lima

- Torneo Plácido Galindo: 1989

Sporting Cristal

- Torneo Descentralizado: 1996

Alianza Atlético

- Torneo Descentralizado Top scorer: 1997 (17 goals)
