= Edison Suárez =

Uruguayan footballer (born 1966)

Personal information
- Full name: Edison Omar Suárez Frutos
- Date of birth: 6 November 1966 (age 59)
- Place of birth: Montevideo, Uruguay
- Height: 1.74 m (5 ft 9 in)
- Position: Midfielder

Senior career*
Years	Team	Apps	(Gls)
1987–1990	Danubio		
1990–1992	Real Zaragoza	11	(0)
1992–1994	Nacional	39	(2)
1995	Danubio		
1996	Palestino	9	(0)
1997	Central Español		
1998–1999	Millonarios		
2000	Rocha		
2001–2002	Fénix		

International career
1988–1990	Uruguay	12	(1)
- * Club domestic league appearances and goals

Edison Omar Suárez Frutos (born November 6, 1966, in Montevideo, Uruguay) is a former Uruguayan footballer who played for clubs in Uruguay, Spain, Chile and Colombia and the Uruguay national football team.

== Teams ==
- (Uruguay) Danubio 1987–1990
- (Spain) Real Zaragoza 1990–1992
- (Uruguay) Nacional 1992–1994
- (Uruguay) Danubio 1995
- (Chile) Palestino 1996
- (Uruguay) Central Español 1997
- (Colombia) Millonarios 1998–1999
- (Uruguay) Rocha 2000
- (Uruguay) Fénix 2001–2002
