= Ramón Escobar (footballer) =

Paraguayan footballer (born 1964)

Personal information
- Full name: Ramón Alfredo Escobar Núñez
- Date of birth: 3 October 1964 (age 62)
- Position: Midfielder

Senior career*
Years	Team	Apps	(Gls)
1988–1989	River Plate Asunción		
1989	Sporting Barranquilla		
1989–1990	San Lorenzo	7	(0)
1995	Audax Italiano	14	(1)

International career
1988–1989	Paraguay	17	(1)
- * Club domestic league appearances and goals

Ramón Alfredo Escobar Núñez (born 3 October 1964) is a Paraguayan former footballer. He played in 17 matches for the Paraguay national football team from 1988 to 1989. He was also part of Paraguay's squad for the 1989 Copa América tournament.

== Career ==
- River Plate Asunción 1988–1989
- Sporting Barranquilla 1989
- San Lorenzo de Almagro 1989–1990
- Audax Italiano 1995
