= Bernardo Añor Jr. =

Venezuelan footballer (born 1988)

Bernardo Añor
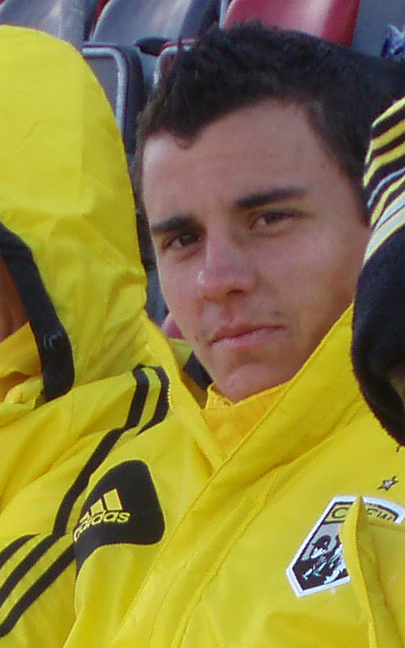
- Añor with Columbus Crew in 2012

Personal information
- Full name: Bernardo Añor Acosta
- Date of birth: May 24, 1988 (age 38)
- Place of birth: Caracas, Venezuela
- Height: 6 ft 1 in (1.85 m)
- Positions: Left back; midfielder

Youth career
- 2005–2007: Caracas

College career
| Years | Team | Apps | (Gls) |
| 2007–2010 | South Florida Bulls | 59 | (21) |

Senior career*
| Years | Team | Apps | (Gls) |
| 2010 | Bradenton Academics | 0 | (0) |
| 2011–2014 | Columbus Crew | 71 | (12) |
| 2015–2016 | Sporting Kansas City | 13 | (0) |
| 2016 | → Minnesota United (loan) | 7 | (0) |
| 2017 | Minnesota United | 0 | (0) |
| 2018–2020 | Caracas | 55 | (8) |

International career
| 2018–2019 | Venezuela | 3 | (0) |
- * Club domestic league appearances and goals as of 15:18, 18 February 2021 (UTC)

Bernardo Añor Acosta (Spanish pronunciation: [aˈɲoɾ]; born May 24, 1988) is a Venezuelan footballer who plays as a defender or a midfielder.

== Career ==
=== College and amateur ===
During the 2010 collegiate off-season Añor was on the roster of the Bradenton Academics in the USL Premier Development League, but never actually saw any minutes with the team.

=== Professional ===
On January 14, 2011, Añor was drafted in the third round (48th overall) in the 2011 MLS SuperDraft by Columbus Crew. He made his professional debut on March 26, 2011, in a 0–0 tie with the New York Red Bulls, and scored his first professional goal on June 18 in a 2–0 win over Houston Dynamo and for his actions on field, earned MLS Player of the Week honors in the process.

Añor was traded to Sporting Kansas City on December 8, 2014.

Añor spent the 2016 season on loan with NASL side Minnesota United FC. It was announced on January 24, 2017, that Añor had signed with Minnesota United FC as the team built its roster for its first Major League Soccer season.

=== International ===
Añor is an experienced youth international, having represented Venezuela at U-15 and U-20 levels. He made his debut for the senior squad on 16 November 2018 in a friendly against Japan as a 74th-minute substitute for Luis Mago.

== Personal ==
Bernardo's father, also named Bernardo Añor, was a professional soccer player in Venezuela. His younger brother Juanpi is also a footballer.
