= Enrique Verduga =

Ecuadorian footballer (born 1964)

Personal information
- Full name: Enrique Wilfrido Verduga Zamora
- Date of birth: 19 January 1964 (age 62)
- Place of birth: Chone, Ecuador
- Position: Midfielder

International career
Years	Team	Apps	(Gls)
1987–1995	Ecuador	12	(0)

Enrique Verduga (born 19 January 1964) is an Ecuadorian footballer. He played in twelve matches for the Ecuador national football team from 1987 to 1995. He was also part of Ecuador's squad for the 1989 Copa América tournament.
