= Carlos Guido =

Peruvian footballer (born 1966)

Personal information
- Date of birth: 18 April 1966 (age 60)
- Place of birth: Lima, Peru

International career
Years	Team	Apps	(Gls)
1989–1991	Peru	8	(0)

Carlos Guido (born 18 April 1966) is a Peruvian footballer. He played in eight matches for the Peru national football team from 1989 to 1991. He was also part of Peru's squad for the 1989 Copa América tournament.
