= Abel Lobatón Vesgas =

Peruvian footballer (born 1957)

Personal information
- Full name: Abel Augusto Lobatón Vesgas
- Date of birth: 22 August 1957 (age 69)
- Place of birth: Lima, Peru
- Position: Forward

Senior career*
Years	Team	Apps	(Gls)
1975–1979	Sport Boys		
1980–1981	Deportes Quindío		
1982–1984	Deportivo Pereira		
1984	Unión Huaral		
1985	Deportivo Pereira		
1985	Sport Boys		
1986	Deportivo Pereira		
1987	Independiente Medellín		
1988–1990	Sport Boys		

International career
1979–1985	Peru	8	(3)
- * Club domestic league appearances and goals

Abel Augusto Lobatón Vesgas (born 22 August 1957) is a Peruvian footballer who played as a forward. He is the father of Peruvian internationals Abel and Carlos Lobatón.

== Biography ==
=== Club career ===
Abel Lobatón Vesgas began his career with Sport Boys of Callao in 1975. He played there intermittently for eight seasons from his debut until 1990, the year of his retirement from professional football. Runner-up in the Peruvian league with Sport Boys in 1976, he had the opportunity to play in the Copa Libertadores the following year (three matches played). He had a second stint with another Peruvian club, Unión Huaral, in 1984.

He spent a large part of his career in Colombia during the 1980s, playing two seasons for Deportes Quindío (1980–1981) before joining one of the best teams, Deportivo Pereira (alongside Eduardo Vilarete, Iván Chumi Castañeda, Jairo Chiqui Aguirre, and Miguel Ángel Manzi), which was on the verge of winning the 1982 Colombian championship before collapsing three matches from the end. In 1987, he returned to Independiente Medellín, his last club in Colombia.

=== International career ===
Abel Lobatón, who earned eight caps for Peru between 1979 and 1985, scored three goals for the national team. He only played in friendly matches for Peru.

== Statistics ==
Appearances and goals by national team and year
National team	Year	Apps	Goals
Peru
Peru	1979	4	1
Peru	1984	2	2
Peru	1985	2	0
Total		8	3

List of international goals scored by Abel Lobatón Vesgas
No.	Date	Venue	Opponent	Score	Result	Competition
1.	10 October 1979	Estadio Nacional, Lima, Peru	Paraguay	2–3	2–3	Friendly
2.	2 August 1984	Estadio Atanasio Girardot, Medellín, Colombia	Colombia	1–1	1–1	Friendly
3.	3 October 1984	Estadio Nacional, Lima, Peru	Uruguay	1–2	1–3	Friendly
