= Luis Rojas (Venezuelan footballer) =

Venezuelan footballer (born 1963)

Personal information
- Date of birth: 1 August 1963 (age 63)

International career
Years	Team	Apps	(Gls)
1989	Venezuela	1	(0)

Luis Rojas (born 1 August 1963) is a Venezuelan footballer. He played in one match for the Venezuela national football team in 1989. He was also part of Venezuela's squad for the 1989 Copa América tournament.
