= José Gregorio Gómez =

Venezuelan footballer (born 1963)

Personal information
- Date of birth: 27 December 1963 (age 62)

International career
Years	Team	Apps	(Gls)
1989–1993	Venezuela	13	(0)

José Gregorio Gómez (born 27 December 1963) is a Venezuelan footballer. He played in 13 matches for the Venezuela national football team from 1989 to 1993. He was also part of Venezuela's squad for the 1989 Copa América tournament.
