= Andrés Paz =

Venezuelan footballer (born 1963)

Personal information
- Date of birth: 30 November 1963 (age 62)

International career
Years	Team	Apps	(Gls)
1989–1995	Venezuela	9	(0)

Andrés Paz (born 30 November 1963) is a Venezuelan footballer. He played in nine matches for the Venezuela national football team from 1989 to 1995. He was also part of Venezuela's squad for the 1989 Copa América tournament.
