= Ricardo Fontana =

Bolivian footballer (born 1950)

Personal information
- Date of birth: 17 October 1950 (age 76)
- Place of birth: Córdoba, Argentina
- Position: Defender

International career
Years	Team	Apps	(Gls)
1989	Bolivia	13	(0)

Ricardo Fontana (born 17 October 1950) is a Bolivian footballer. He played in 13 matches for the Bolivia national football team in 1989. He was also part of Bolivia's squad for the 1989 Copa América tournament.
