= Eligio Martínez =

Bolivian footballer (1955–2024)

Personal information
- Full name: Eligio Martínez Villasboa
- Date of birth: 21 July 1955
- Place of birth: Itá, Central Department, Paraguay
- Date of death: 10 September 2024 (aged 69)
- Place of death: Paraguay
- Height: 1.85 m (6 ft 1 in)
- Position: Defender

Senior career*
Years	Team	Apps	(Gls)
1980	Bolívar		
1981–1991	The Strongest		
1992	Jorge Wilstermann		
1993–1994	The Strongest		

International career
1989	Bolivia	14	(0)
- * Club domestic league appearances and goals

Eligio Martínez Villasboa (21 July 1955 – 10 September 2024) was a Paraguayan-born Bolivian footballer who played as a defender. He made 14 appearances for the Bolivia national team in 1989. He was also part of Bolivia's squad for the 1989 Copa América tournament. Martínez died on 10 September 2024, at the age of 69.
