= Claudio Alcívar =

Ecuadorian footballer (born 1966)

Personal information
- Full name: Geovanni Claudio Alcivar Cedeño
- Date of birth: 15 July 1966 (age 60)
- Place of birth: Flavio Alfaro, Ecuador

International career
Years	Team	Apps	(Gls)
1987–1989	Ecuador	9	(0)

Claudio Alcívar (born 15 July 1966) is an Ecuadorian former footballer. He played in nine matches for the Ecuador national football team from 1987 to 1989. He was also part of Ecuador's squad for the 1989 Copa América tournament.
