= Juan Caballero (footballer) =

Peruvian footballer (born 1958)

Personal information
- Date of birth: 17 June 1958 (age 68)

International career
Years	Team	Apps	(Gls)
1980–1986	Peru	16	(3)

Juan Caballero (born 17 June 1958) is a Peruvian footballer. He played in 16 matches for the Peru national football team from 1980 to 1986. He was also part of Peru's squad for the 1983 Copa América tournament.
