= Augusto Chamorro =

Paraguayan footballer (born 1963)

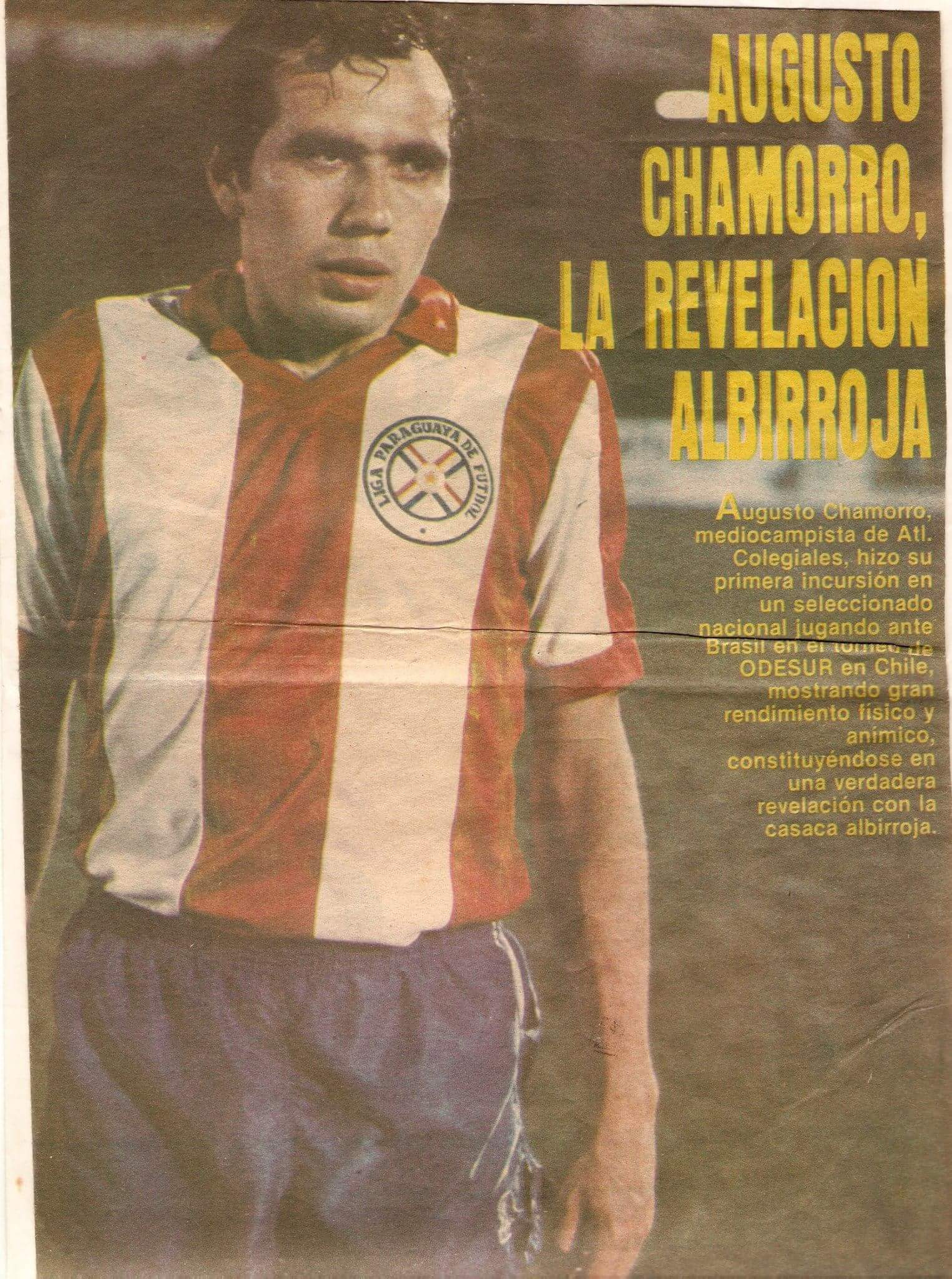
- Augusto Chamorro en la selección

Personal information
- Date of birth: 12 March 1963 (age 63)

International career
Years	Team	Apps	(Gls)
1988–1989	Paraguay	12	(0)

Augusto Chamorro (born 12 March 1963) is a Paraguayan footballer. He played in twelve matches for the Paraguay national football team from 1988 to 1989. He was also part of Paraguay's squad for the 1989 Copa América tournament.

Partido: Colegiales 1 - Cerro Porteño 0.

Figura del partido: Augusto Chamorro (Una máquina).
