= Luis Camacaro =

Venezuelan footballer (born 1967)

Personal information
- Date of birth: 24 November 1967 (age 58)

International career
| Years | Team | Apps | (Gls) |
| 1989 | Venezuela | 3 | (0) |

Luis Camacaro (born 24 November 1967) is a Venezuelan footballer. He played in three matches for the Venezuela national football team in 1989. He was also part of Venezuela's squad for the 1989 Copa América tournament.
