= Laureano Jaimes =

Venezuelan footballer (born 1961)

Personal information
- Date of birth: 13 July 1961 (age 65)

International career
Years	Team	Apps	(Gls)
1985–1995	Venezuela	13	(0)

Laureano Jaimes (born 13 July 1961) is a Venezuelan footballer. He played in 13 matches for the Venezuela national football team from 1985 to 1995. He was also part of Venezuela's squad for the 1989 Copa América tournament.
