= Romerito =

Paraguayan footballer (born 1960)

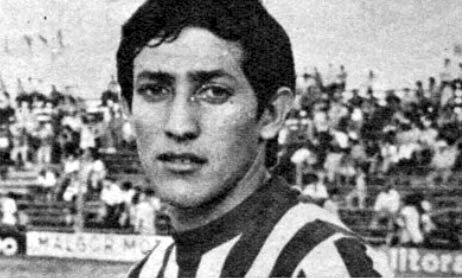
- Romerito with Paraguay U20 in 1979

Personal information
- Full name: Julio César Romero Insfrán
- Date of birth: 28 August 1960 (age 66)
- Place of birth: Luque, Paraguay
- Height: 1.73 m (5 ft 8 in)
- Position: Attacking midfielder

Senior career*
Years	Team	Apps	(Gls)
1977–1979	Sportivo Luqueño	113	(33)
1980–1983	New York Cosmos	104	(37)
1983–1988	Fluminense	211	(59)
1989	Barcelona	7	(1)
1989–1990	Puebla	81	(16)
1990–1991	Sportivo Luqueño	35	(11)
1992	Olimpia Asunción	24	(9)
1993–1994	Sportivo Luqueño	43	(13)
1995	Deportes La Serena	3	(1)
1995	Club Cerro Corá	1	(0)
1996–1998	Sportivo Luqueño	66	(33)
Total		688	(213)

International career
1979–1989	Paraguay	34	(13)
- * Club domestic league appearances and goals

Julio César Romero Insfrán (born 28 August 1960), also known as Romerito, is a Paraguayan former professional footballer who played as a midfielder, considered among the greatest players in Paraguayan football history. He is the only Paraguayan named by Pelé as one of the FIFA 100 in March 2004.

== Career ==
Born in Luque, Paraguay, Romerito started his career at local club Sportivo Luqueño in 1977, by 1979 Romerito's consistent performances had earned him a place in the Paraguay national team that played in the FIFA World Youth Championship and was considered one of the best players of the tournament along with Diego Maradona. In the same year, Romerito played a key role in Paraguay's win in the Copa América, scoring three goals.

In 1980, he joined now defunct New York Cosmos where he played alongside such greats as the Brazilian and German World Cup winning captains of 1970 and 1974 Carlos Alberto and Franz Beckenbauer. In the 1980 Soccer Bowl he scored the game-winning goal of a 3–0 victory over Ft. Lauderdale.

Romerito moved to Brazil to play for Fluminense where he was selected as the South American Footballer of the Year in 1985. He became a fan favorite after leading the team to a Campeonato Brasileiro.

In 1986, he was a key player in helping the Paraguay national team return to the FIFA World Cup finals after a 28-year hiatus. At the finals in Mexico, he scored against Iraq and the host nation in the first round.

After a short spell with FC Barcelona in Spain and a stint in Mexico with Puebla F.C. Romerito returned to South America where he played out his career with Olimpia, Club Cerro Corá and Sportivo Luqueño in Paraguay and Deportes La Serena in Chile.

During his career, he scored a little more than 400 goals.

== International goals ==
Scores and results list Paraguay's goal tally first.

No.	Date	Venue	Opponent	Score	Result	Competition
1.	31 October 1979	Rio de Janeiro, Brazil	Brazil	2–2	2–2	1979 Copa América
2.	28 November 1979	Asunción, Paraguay	Chile	1–0	3–0	1979 Copa América
3.	28 November 1979	Asunción, Paraguay	Chile	3–0	3–0	1979 Copa América
4.	31 May 1981	Asunción, Paraguay	Ecuador	3–0	3–1	1982 FIFA World Cup qualification
5.	5 October 1983	Lima, Peru	Peru	1–0	2–0	Friendly
6.	7 October 1983	Asunción, Paraguay	Peru	2–0	4–1	Friendly
7.	7 October 1983	Asunción, Paraguay	Peru	4–1	4–1	Friendly
8.	9 June 1985	Asunción, Paraguay	Bolivia	3–0	3–0	1986 FIFA World Cup qualification
9.	23 June 1985	Rio de Janeiro, Brazil	Brazil	1–1	1–1	1986 FIFA World Cup qualification
10.	27 October 1985	Asunción, Paraguay	Colombia	2–0	3–0	1986 FIFA World Cup qualification
11.	17 November 1985	Santiago, Chile	Chile	2–1	2–2	1986 FIFA World Cup qualification
12.	4 June 1986	Toluca, Mexico	Iraq	1–0	1–0	1986 FIFA World Cup
13.	7 June 1986	Mexico City, Mexico	Mexico	1–1	1–1	1986 FIFA World Cup

== Honours ==
New York Cosmos

- NASL: 1980, 1982

Fluminense

- Série A: 1984
- Campeonato Carioca: 1984, 1985

Barcelona

- UEFA Cup Winners' Cup: 1988–89

Puebla

- Primera División: 1989–90
- Copa Mexico: 1989–90

Olimpia Asunción

- Torneo República: 1992

Paraguay

- Copa América: 1979

Individual

- South American Footballer of the Year: 1985; Silver Award: 1979
- South American Team of the Year: 1986
- Paraguayan First Division top scorer: 1990
- FIFA top 125 greatest living footballers: 2004

== Facts ==
- Romerito is the joint-fourth highest scorer in the history of the Paraguay national team with 13 goals.
- Romerito is a politician for the Colorado Party in his native city of Luque and works as a city counselor.
- In September 2006, Romerito made his debut as a rock singer in the Paraguayan music festival called "Pilsen Rock". He took the stage as a guest of the popular local band Revolber and sang the opening words of the song "Siete hermanos, 1 misil" in front of a crowd of 40,000.
