= Nelson Guerrero =

Ecuadorian footballer (born 1962)

Personal information
- Date of birth: 12 July 1962 (age 64)
- Position: Forward

International career
| Years | Team | Apps | (Gls) |
| 1988–1989 | Ecuador | 13 | (2) |

Nelson Guerrero (born 12 July 1962) is an Ecuadorian former footballer. He played in 13 matches for the Ecuador national football team from 1988 to 1989. He was also part of Ecuador's squad for the 1989 Copa América tournament.
