= Jorge Talavera =

Peruvian footballer (born 1963)

Jorge Talavera Campos
Personal information
- Date of birth: 4 June 1992 (age 34)
- Place of birth: Lima, Peru

International career
Years	Team	Apps	(Gls)
1992	Peru	6	(0)

Jorge Talavera (born 31 December 1963) is a Peruvian footballer. He played in six matches for the Peru national football team from 1988 to 1989. He was also part of Peru's squad for the 1989 Copa América tournament.
