= Carlos Torres (Peruvian footballer) =

Peruvian footballer (born 1966)

Personal information
- Full name: Carlos Antonio Torres Garay
- Date of birth: 25 June 1966 (age 60)
- Place of birth: Lima, Peru
- Height: 1.84 m (6 ft 0 in)
- Position: Midfielder

Senior career*
Years	Team	Apps	(Gls)
1986	Sport Boys		
1987–1991	Internazionale San Borja		
1992–1995	Sporting Cristal		
1996	Juan Aurich		
1997	Alianza Atlético		
1998	Sporting Cristal		
1998–1999	Juan Aurich		
2000	Alianza Atlético		

International career
1989	Peru	5	(1)
- * Club domestic league appearances and goals

Carlos Antonio Torres Garay (born 25 June 1966) is a Peruvian former footballer who played as a midfielder. He made five appearances for the Peru national team in 1989. He was also part of Peru's squad for the 1989 Copa América tournament.
