= César Rodríguez (footballer, born 1967) =

Peruvian footballer

Personal information
- Full name: César Eduardo Rodríguez Huamani
- Date of birth: 21 September 1966
- Date of death: 25 july 1997
- Position: Midfielder

Senior career*
Years	Team	Apps	(Gls)
1988–1990	Deportivo Municipal		
1991	Alianza Lima		
1992	Universitario		

International career
1989–1991	Peru	16	(3)
- * Club domestic league appearances and goals

César Eduardo Rodríguez Huamani (born 21 September 1966 – 25 july 1997) was a Peruvian international footballer.

== Playing career ==
=== Club ===
Rodríguez played for Deportivo Municipal, Alianza Lima and Universitario.

=== International ===
Rodríguez made 16 appearances, scoring 3 goals, for the Peru national football team from 1989 to 1991. He participated in the 1981 and 1991 Copa América.
