= Carlos Domínguez (Venezuelan footballer) =

Venezuelan footballer (born 1966)

Personal information
- Date of birth: 1966 (age 59–60)

International career
Years	Team	Apps	(Gls)
1989	Venezuela	3	(1)

Carlos Domínguez (born 1966) is a Venezuelan footballer. He played in three matches for the Venezuela national football team in 1989. He was also part of Venezuela's squad for the 1989 Copa América tournament.
