= Douglas Cedeño =

Venezuelan footballer (born 1960)

Personal information
- Date of birth: 11 February 1960 (age 66)
- Position: Midfielder

International career
Years	Team	Apps	(Gls)
1985	Venezuela	7	(2)

Douglas Cedeño (born 11 February 1960) is a Venezuelan footballer. He played in seven matches for the Venezuela national football team in 1985. He was also part of Venezuela's squad for the 1983 Copa América tournament.
