= Miguel Ángel Noro =

Bolivian footballer (born 1961)

Personal information
- Date of birth: 22 August 1961 (age 65)
- Place of birth: Riberalta, Bolivia

International career
Years	Team	Apps	(Gls)
1985–1993	Bolivia	13	(0)

Miguel Ángel Noro (born 22 August 1961) is a Bolivian footballer. He played in 13 matches for the Bolivia national football team from 1985 to 1993. He was also part of Bolivia's squad for the 1987 Copa América tournament.
