= Herbert Márquez =

Venezuelan footballer (born 1963)

Personal information
- Date of birth: 30 November 1963 (age 62)
- Place of birth: Puerto la Cruz, Venezuela

International career
Years	Team	Apps	(Gls)
1985–1994	Venezuela	17	(2)

Herbert Márquez (born 30 November 1963) is a Venezuelan footballer. He played in 17 matches for the Venezuela national football team from 1985 to 1994. He was also part of Venezuela's squad for the 1987 Copa América tournament.
