= René Torres =

Venezuelan footballer (born 1960)

Personal information
- Date of birth: 13 October 1960 (age 66)

International career
Years	Team	Apps	(Gls)
1985–1989	Venezuela	19	(2)

René Torres (born 13 October 1960) is a Venezuelan footballer. He played in 19 matches for the Venezuela national football team from 1985 to 1989. He was also part of Venezuela's squad for the 1983 Copa América tournament.
