= Juan Daniel Cardellino =

Uruguayan football referee

Juan Daniel Cardellino de San Vicente (March 4, 1942 – September 8, 2007) was a football (soccer) referee from Uruguay, who officiated at two FIFA World Cups: 1982 (two matches) and 1990 (one match).
