= Miguel Augusto Prince =

Colombian footballer and manager (born 1957)

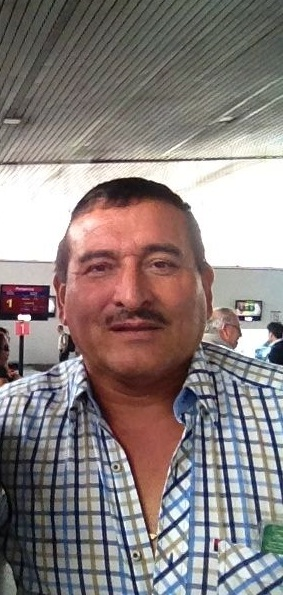

Personal information
- Full name: Miguel Augusto Prince Franco
- Date of birth: 30 July 1957 (age 69)
- Place of birth: Ocaña, Norte de Santander, Colombia
- Position: Defender

Senior career*
Years	Team	Apps	(Gls)
1976–1979	Bucaramanga	143	(8)
1980–1988	Millonarios	324	(32)
1989	América	15	(0)

International career
1979–1985	Colombia	19	(6)

Managerial career
- 1992–1993: Millonarios
- 1995–1996: Millonarios
- 1996: Unión Magdalena
- 1997–1999: Unión Magdalena
- 2005–2006: Millonarios
- 2007: Atlético Bucaramanga
- 2007–2008: Pasto
- 2009: Huila
- 2010: Atlético Bucaramanga
- 2010–2012: Patriotas
- 2013: Atlético Bucaramanga
- 2013–2015: Deportes Quindío
- 2016: Cúcuta Deportivo
- 2017: Unión Comercio
- * Club domestic league appearances and goals

Miguel Augusto Prince Franco (born 30 July 1957) is a Colombian football manager and former player.

== Playing career ==
=== Club ===
Born in Ocaña, Norte de Santander, Prince played football as a defender for Millonarios during his 17-year professional career.

=== International ===
Prince scored six goals in 19 appearances for the senior Colombia national football team, including participating at the 1983 Copa América.

== Managerial career ==
After he retired from playing, Prince began coaching football. In November 2008, Prince was appointed manager of Atlético Huila. He has also led Millonarios, Unión Magdalena, Deportivo Pasto, Patriotas and Atlético Bucaramanga.
