= Jorge Hirano =

Peruvian footballer (born 1959)

Personal information
- Full name: Jorge Alberto Hirano Matsumoto
- Date of birth: 16 August 1959 (age 67)
- Place of birth: Huaral, Peru
- Height: 1.67 m (5 ft 6 in)
- Position: Forward

Senior career*
| Years | Team | Apps | (Gls) |
| 1977 | Unión Huaral | | |
| 1978–1979 | Juventud La Palma | | |
| 1980–1981 | Fujita Kogyo | 23 | (4) |
| 1982 | Unión Huaral | | |
| 1983–1985 | Sporting Cristal | | |
| 1986–1993 | Bolívar | 208 | (124) |
| 1993 | Deportivo Sipesa | 12 | (1) |
| 1994 | Sport Boys | 1 | (0) |

International career
| 1984–1991 | Peru | 36 | (11) |
- * Club domestic league appearances and goals

Jorge Alberto Hirano Matsumoto (born 16 August 1959) is a Peruvian former professional footballer who played as a forward.

== Club career ==
If Hirano was cheered with La Celeste of Sporting Cristal, he was idolized across of the Cordillera with another Celeste: the one of Club Bolivar of La Paz, where he played eight years and scored 139 goals.

== International career ==
Hirano played a total of 36 games for Peru between 1984 and 1991, scoring 11 goals.

== Career statistics ==
Scores and results list Peru's goal tally first, score column indicates score after each Hirano goal.

List of international goals scored by Jorge Hirano
| No. | Date | Venue | Opponent | Score | Result | Competition |
|---|---|---|---|---|---|---|
| 1 | 26 February 1984 | Estadio Alejandro Villanueva, Lima, Peru | Honduras | 1–1 | 1–3 | Friendly |
| 2 | 9 March 1985 | Estadio Nacional, Lima, Peru | Chile | 1–0 | 1–1 | Friendly |
| 3 | 21 March 1985 | Lima, Peru | Ecuador | 1–0 | 1–0 | Friendly |
| 4 | 16 June 1985 | Estadio Nacional, Lima, Peru | Venezuela | 3–1 | 4–1 | 1986 FIFA World Cup qualification |
| 5 | 21 June 1987 | Estadio Nacional, Lima, Peru | Chile | 2–0 | 2–0 | Friendly |
| 6 | 1 July 1989 | Estádio Fonte Nova, Salvador, Brazil | Paraguay | 1–0 | 2–5 | 1989 Copa América |
| 7 | 09 July 1989 | Estádio do Arruda, Recife, Brazil | Colombia | 1–1 | 1–1 | 1989 Copa América |
| 8 | 12 June 1991 | Estadio Nacional, Lima, Peru | Uruguay | 1–0 | 1–0 | Friendly |
| 9 | 25 June 1991 | Estadio Monumental, Guayaquil, Ecuador | Ecuador | | 2–2 | Friendly |
| 10 | 12 July 1991 | Estadio Nacional, Santiago, Chile | Venezuela | 5–1 | 5–1 | 1991 Copa América |
| 11 | 14 July 1991 | Estadio Nacional, Santiago, Chile | Argentina | 2–3 | 3–3 | 1991 Copa América] |

== Honours ==
Sporting Cristal

- Peruvian League: 1983

Bolívar

- Liga de Fútbol Profesional Boliviano: 1987, 1988, 1991, 1992

Individual

- Liga de Fútbol Profesional Boliviano top scorer: 1991 (19 goals)
