= Alejandro Hisis =

Chilean footballer (born 1962)

Personal information
- Full name: Alejandro Manuel Hisis Anaya
- Date of birth: 16 February 1962 (age 64)
- Place of birth: Valparaíso, Chile
- Height: 1.78 m (5 ft 10 in)
- Position: Defender

Senior career*
| Years | Team | Apps | (Gls) |
| 1978–1980 | Comunicaciones | | |
| 1980 | Green Cross-Temuco | | |
| 1980–1985 | Colo-Colo | | |
| 1985–1990 | OFI | 129 | (8) |
| 1990–1992 | Monterrey | 70 | (2) |
| 1992 | Colo-Colo | | |
| 1992–1994 | Tigres UANL | 26 | (2) |
| 1994–1995 | Pachuca | | |
| 1996 | Palestino | | |
| 1997 | Santiago Morning | | |

International career
| 1981–1989 | Chile | 41 | (2) |

Managerial career
- 2011: O'Higgins (assistant)
- 2011–2012: Deportes Puerto Montt
- 2012: Chile (assistant)
- 2013: San Antonio Unido
- 2014–2015: Ñublense (assistant)
- 2015: Cobreloa (assistant)
- 2015–2016: San Marcos (assistant)
- 2018–2019: Curicó Unido (assistant)
- 2019: OFI (assistant)
- 2019–2020: Deportes Iquique (assistant)
- 2021–2022: Mazatlán (assistant)
- 2024: Deportes Antofagasta (assistant)
- * Club domestic league appearances and goals

Alejandro Hisis Anaya (born 16 February 1962) is a retired Chilean football defender.

== Club career ==
Hisis played for several clubs in Latin America and Europe, including Colo-Colo, Club de Fútbol Monterrey and OFI. He is the first Chilean to play for OFI before Jaime Vera, Miguel Vargas and Felipe Gallegos.

== International career ==
Hisis received 41 caps for the Chile national football team, scoring twice. He started all four of Chile's matches at the 1984 Summer Olympics, where Chile reached the quarter-finals before losing 1–0 to Italy after extra time.

== Managerial career ==
Hisis has mainly served as assistant manager for clubs in his homeland, Mexico and Greece.
