= Bernardo Añor Sr. =

Venezuelan footballer (born 1959)

Bernardo Añor
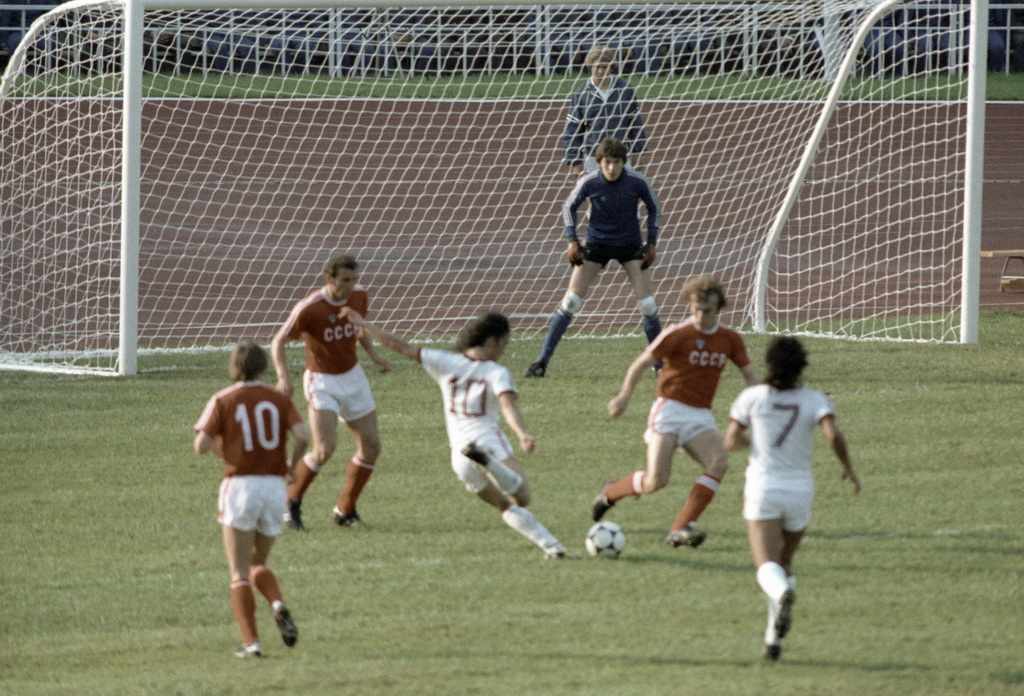
- Bernardo is number 10 in white, playing against the Soviet Union at the 1980 Olympics

Personal information
- Full name: Bernardo Añor Guillamón
- Date of birth: 7 October 1959 (age 67)
- Place of birth: Caracas, Venezuela

International career
Years	Team	Apps	(Gls)
- Venezuela

Bernardo Añor Guillamón (born 7 October 1959) is a Venezuelan footballer. He competed in the men's tournament at the 1980 Summer Olympics.

== Personal life ==
He is father of professional footballers Bernardo Jr. and Juan Pablo.
