= 1995 in Ecuadorian football =

Football in Ecuador
- Season: 1995

The 1995 season is the 73rd season of competitive football in Ecuador.

== National leagues ==
=== Serie A ===
- Champion: Barcelona (12th title)
- International cup qualifiers:
  - 1996 Copa Libertadores: Barcelona, ESPOLI
  - 1996 Copa CONMEBOL: Emelec
- Relegated: Delfín, 9 de Octubre

=== Serie B ===
- Winner: Deportivo Cuenca (2nd title)
- Promoted: Deportivo Cuenca, Técnico Universitario
- Relegated: Valdez, Flamengo

=== Segunda ===
- Winner: Imbabura (1st title)
- Promoted: Imbabura, Santa Rita

== Clubs in international competitions ==
Team	1995 Copa Libertadores	1995 Copa CONMEBOL
Barcelona	N/A	Eliminated in the first round
Emelec	Eliminated in the semifinals	N/A
El Nacional	Eliminated in the first round	N/A

== National teams ==
=== Senior team ===
The Ecuador national team played 10 matches in 1995: three at the Copa América, and seven friendlies, including two at the Kirin Cup and three at the Korea Cup.

==== Copa América ====
For the 1995 Copa America, held in Uruguay, Ecuador was drawn into Group B with Colombia, Brazil, and Peru. They finished third in their group, as well as the third best third-place team, and were eliminated after the group stage.

Team	Pld	W	D	L	GF	GA	GD	Pts
Brazil	3	3	0	0	6	0	+6	9
Colombia	3	1	1	1	2	4	−2	4
Ecuador	3	1	0	2	2	3	−1	3
Peru	3	0	1	2	2	5	−3	1

7 July 1995

Brazil	1 – 0	Ecuador
Ronaldão 73'

Estadio Atilio Paiva Olivera, Rivera
Attendance: 10,000
Referee: Javier Castrilli (Argentina)

10 July 1995

Colombia	1 – 0	Ecuador
Rincón 44'

Estadio Atilio Paiva Olivera, Rivera
Attendance: 8,000
Referee: Pablo Peña (Bolivia)

13 July 1995

Ecuador	2 – 1	Peru
Díaz 61'; Mora 75'		I. Hurtado 82' (o.g.)

Estadio Atilio Paiva Olivera, Rivera
Attendance: 10,000
Referee: Eduardo Dluzniewski (Uruguay)

==== Friendlies ====
30 June 1995

Paraguay	1 – 0	Ecuador
Acuña 46'

Estadio Defensores del Chaco, Asunción
Attendance: 10,000
Referee: Carlos Robles (Chile)

5 October 1995

Bolivia	2 – 2	Ecuador
Etcheverry 2'; Sánchez 29'		M. Tenorio 41'; E. Hurtado 89'

Estadio Ramón Tahuichi Aguilera, Santa Cruz
Attendance: 32,000

===== Kirin Cup =====
Ecuador participated in the 1995 Kirin Cup against Japan and Scotland. Japan won the competition, with Ecuador finishing in third.

24 May 1995

Scotland	2 – 1	Ecuador
Robertson 64'; Crawford 75'		I. Hurtado 68' (pen.)

Toyama Athletic Stadium, Toyama
Attendance: 5,669
Referee: Masayoshi Okada (Japan)

28 May 1995

Japan	3 – 0	Ecuador
Nakayama 36'; Miura 46' (pen.), 53' (pen.)

National Stadium, Tokyo
Attendance: 53,438
Referee: Lutz Michael Fröhlich (Germany)

===== Korea Cup =====
Ecuador participated in the 1995 Korea Cup, a friendly international tournament used to help train the South Korean national team. Ecuador won the competition.

4 June 1995

Ecuador	4 – 1	Zambia
E. Hurtado 19', 66', 78', 81'		Bwayla 51'

Changwon Civil Stadium, Changwon
Attendance: 18,000
Referee: Lee Sang-Kwon (South Korea)

10 June 1995

Ecuador	2 – 1	Costa Rica
E. Hurtado 37'; Díaz 57'		Madrigal 76'

Olympic Stadium, Seoul
Attendance: 50,000
Referee: Duk-Hwan (South Korea)

12 June 1995

Ecuador	1 – 0	Zambia
Díaz 57'

Olympic Stadium, Seoul
Attendance: 18,000
Referee: Kwang-Taik (South Korea)
