= Luis Quiñonez =

Luis Quiñones may refer to:

- Luis Quiñónez (footballer) (born 1968), Colombian footballer
- Luis Quiñonez (politician), Guatemalan-American war veteran and business executive

== See also ==
- Luis Quiñones (disambiguation)
- José Luis Quiñónez (born 1984), Ecuadorian footballer
