= Kodiak Kowboy =

American-bred Thoroughbred racehorse

- Sire: Posse
- Grandsire: Silver Deputy
- Dam: Kokadrie
- Damsire: Coronado's Quest
- Sex: Stallion
- Foaled: 2005
- Country: United States
- Colour: Bay
- Breeder: Hartwell Farm
- Owner: Vinery Stables & Fox Hill Farm
- Trainer: Larry Jones
- Record: 23: 11-4-3
- Earnings: $1,668,529

Major wins
- Carter Handicap (2009); Vosburgh Stakes (2009); Cigar Mile Handicap (2009)

Awards
- Canadian Champion 2-Year-Old Colt (2007); American Champion Sprint Horse (2009)
- Last updated on January 19, 2009

Kodiak Kowboy (foaled April 16, 2005 in Kentucky) is a retired American Thoroughbred racehorse owned by Vinery Stables and Fox Hill Farms and trained by Steve Asmussen. He was also trained by Larry Jones for part of his career. In 2007 he won a Sovereign Award as Canadian Champion 2-Year-Old Colt.

Kodiak Kowboy is a multiple grade one winning horse and top class sprinter. In 2009, he was voted the Eclipse Award as the American Champion Sprint Horse (2009) for his victories in the Carter Handicap, Vosburgh Stakes and Cigar Mile Handicap.

He was retired to stud duty on November 28, 2009, and stood at the Vinery in 2010 as the property of a syndicate for a fee of $15,000. He shuttled to Brazil in 2014 and then was transferred to Brazil in 2015, and after that, relocated to Uruguay in 2017.

March 6 Kodiak Kowboy had his first mare checked in foal, Frank Mancini's Biogio's Beauty, a multiple stakes-placed winner by top sire Distorted Humor.

He is the sire of Santa Anita Handicap winner MELATONIN, G3SW-US Rated R Superstar, G3SW-UAE Cool Cowboy (now at stud in Russia), G1SW-Brazil Jackson Pollock, G3SW-Brz Gogo Boy, as well as Brazilian SWs Wil Myers, Eron do Jaguarete and several additional US SWs.

== Races (WIP) ==
Race	Grade	Finish	Distance	Track	Date	Jockey
Maiden Special Weight	N/A	4th	2 furlongs	Woodbine	April 29, 2007	Emma-Jayne Wilson
Maiden Special Weight	N/A	1st	4 1/2 furlongs	Churchill	May 26, 2007	Robby Albarado
Victoria Stakes	N/A	1st	5 furlongs	Woodbine	June 17, 2007	Emma-Jayne Wilson
Bashford Manor	G3	1st	6 furlongs	Churchill	July 7, 2007	Corey Lanerie
Saratoga Special Stakes	G2	1st	6 1/2 furlongs	Saratoga Race Course	August 16, 2007	Shaun Bridgmohan
Futurity Stakes	G2	2nd	7 furlongs	Belmont Park	September 15, 2007	Shaun Bridgmohan
Breeders' Cup Juvenile	G1	3rd	1 1/16 miles	Monmouth Park	October 27, 2007	John Velazquez
Allowance Optional Claiming	N/A	1st	6 furlongs	Oaklawn Park	March 14, 2008	Luis Quinonez
