= Mauricio Ramos (Bolivian footballer) =

Bolivian footballer (born 1969)

Personal information
- Full name: Juan Mauricio Ramos Méndez
- Date of birth: September 23, 1969 (age 57)
- Place of birth: Santa Cruz de la Sierra, Bolivia
- Height: 1.75 m (5 ft 9 in)
- Position: Midfielder

Youth career
- 1980–1987: Tahuichi Academy

Senior career*
Years	Team	Apps	(Gls)
1988–1993	Destroyers		
1994–1995	Guabirá		
1995	Cruzeiro	2	(0)
1997–1998	The Strongest		
1998–1999	Tampa Bay Mutiny	52	(12)
2000	New England Revolution	21	(3)
2001	Oriente Petrolero	4	(0)
2002	Unión Central		
2003	San José		

International career
1987–1999	Bolivia	35	(1)
- * Club domestic league appearances and goals as of May 17, 2008

Juan Mauricio Ramos Méndez (born 23 September 1969, in Santa Cruz de la Sierra) is a retired Bolivian football midfielder. He played 35 international matches and scored 1 goal for the Bolivia national team, including an appearance in the 1994 FIFA World Cup.

== Club career ==
Nicknamed "Tapera", Ramos initiated his career in 1988, playing for Bolivian club Destroyers, alongside future stars Marco Etcheverry and Erwin Sánchez as teammates. They quickly established themselves as the "Golden Trio" because of their impressive ability and the perfect blend they created on the field. In 1994, Ramos transferred to club Guabirá, where he excelled and became the best player in the league. In 1995, he went abroad and signed for Brazilian team Cruzeiro. While playing in Brazil, Ramos suffered a serious knee injury that kept him away from the sport for nearly 14 months. After his recovery in 1997, he returned to first division football in great shape with club The Strongest before joining the Major League Soccer, where he played for the Tampa Bay Mutiny (1998–99) and the New England Revolution (2000). After leaving the MLS, he played for Bolivian teams Oriente Petrolero, Unión Central and Club San José, where his career came to an end in 2003.

== International career ==
Between 1987 and 1999, Ramos earned a total of 35 caps in the Bolivia national team. He scored his only goal with Bolivia on July 14, 1995, during a 2–2 draw against Chile in the 1995 Copa América hosted by Uruguay.

=== International goals ===
Goal	Date	Venue	Opponent	Score	Result	Competition
1.	July 14, 1995	Estadio Parque Artigas, Paysandú, Uruguay	Chile	2–2	2–2	1995 Copa América

== Honors ==
Individual

- MLS All-Star, 1998

== See also ==
- List of foreign MLS players
