= 1995 Lunar New Year Cup =

Tournament details
- Host country: Hong Kong
- Dates: 31 January – 4 February
- Teams: 4
- Venue(s): 1 (in 1 host city)

Final positions
- Champions: FR Yugoslavia (1st title)
- Runners-up: South Korea
- Third place: Colombia
- Fourth place: Hong Kong

Tournament statistics
- Matches played: 4
- Goals scored: 10 (2.5 per match)
- Top scorer(s): (Federal Republic of Yugoslavia) Savo Milošević (2 goals)

The 1995 Lunar New Year Cup was an exhibition association football tournament that took place in Hong Kong. Yugoslavia won the tournament after beating South Korea 1–0 in the final with a goal from Darko Kovačević.

== Participants ==
- Hong Kong League XI (host)
- FR Yugoslavia
- South Korea
- Colombia

== Results ==
=== Semifinals ===
31 January 1995

South Korea	1–0	Colombia
Yong-soo 52'	Report

Hong Kong Stadium, Hong Kong
Attendance: 29,296

31 January 1995

Hong Kong League XI	1–3	FR Yugoslavia
Cheng Sin 27'	Report; Report	Nadj 18'; Milošević 42', 82'

Hong Kong Stadium, Hong Kong
Attendance: 29,296

=== Third place match ===
4 February 1995

Hong Kong League XI	1–3	Colombia
Tempest 72'	Report	Betancourth 5'; Pacheco 78'; Quiñónez 85'

Hong Kong Stadium, Hong Kong
Attendance: 30,745

=== Final ===
4 February 1995

FR Yugoslavia	1–0	South Korea
Kovačević 50'	Report; Report

Hong Kong Stadium, Hong Kong
Attendance: 30,745

1995 Lunar New Year Cup winner

FR Yugoslavia
First title

== Statistics ==
=== Goalscorers ===
There were 10 goals scored in 4 matches, for an average of 2.5 goals per match.

2 goals

- (Federal Republic of Yugoslavia) Savo Milošević

1 goal

- (Colombia) Arley Betancourth
- (Colombia) Luis Quiñónez
- (Colombia) Victor Pacheco
- (South Korea) Choi Yong-soo
- (Hong Kong) Dale Tempest
- (Hong Kong) Ricky Cheng Sin
- (Federal Republic of Yugoslavia) Albert Nadj
- (Federal Republic of Yugoslavia) Darko Kovačević

== See also ==
- LG Cup
