= Enzo Francescoli =

Uruguayan footballer (born 1961)

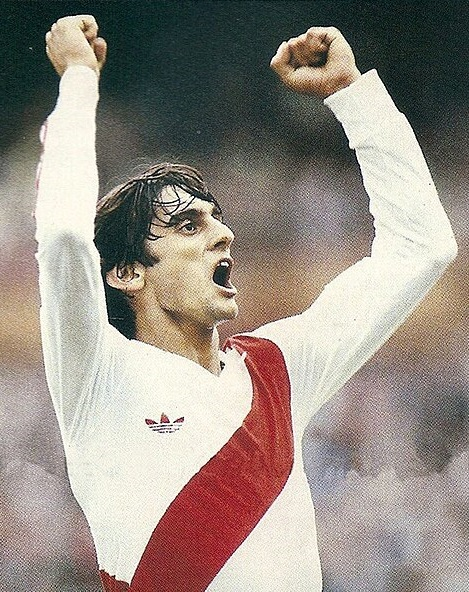
- Francescoli in 1984 with River Plate

Personal information
- Full name: Enzo Francescoli Uriarte
- Date of birth: 12 November 1961 (age 64)
- Place of birth: Montevideo, Uruguay
- Height: 5 ft 11 1/4 in (1.81 m)
- Positions: Attacking midfielder; forward

Youth career
- Wanderers

Senior career*
Years	Team	Apps	(Gls)
1980–1982	Wanderers	74	(20)
1983–1986	River Plate	113	(68)
1986–1989	RC Paris	89	(32)
1989–1990	Marseille	28	(11)
1990–1993	Cagliari	98	(17)
1993–1994	Torino	24	(3)
1994–1997	River Plate	84	(47)
Total		510	(198)

International career
1982–1997	Uruguay	73	(17)
Medal record
Men's football
Representing Uruguay
Copa América
Winner	1983
Winner	1987
Winner	1995
Runner-up	1989
CONMEBOL–UEFA Cup of Champions
Runner-up	1985
- * Club domestic league appearances and goals

Enzo Francescoli Uriarte (Spanish pronunciation: [ˈenso fɾan'tʃeskoli uˈɾjaɾte]; born 12 November 1961), nicknamed "El Príncipe" (lit. 'The Prince'), is a Uruguayan former footballer who played as an attacking midfielder or forward. He is regarded as one of the best playmakers of his generation and as one of Uruguay's and South America's greatest ever players. He represented his nation at two FIFA World Cups, in 1986 and 1990, also winning the Copa América in 1983, 1987 and 1995.

At club level, Francescoli began his career with Uruguayan club Wanderers. In neighbouring Argentina, he played for River Plate. He was the leading scorer and a key player for the club's second Copa Libertadores title. Francescoli won a total of five Argentine titles in the six years he played for the club. He also enjoyed success in France with Racing Paris and Marseille, where his performances proved decisive as the team won the 1989–90 French Division 1. He later also had spells in Italy with Cagliari and Torino, before returning to River Plate, where he ended his career.

He was considered an elite playmaker in the Uruguay national team. He played 73 times for the Celeste between 1982 and his retirement in 1997, making him the most capped outfield player in Uruguayan international football at the time.

Francescoli was the only Uruguayan included by Pelé in the FIFA 100 list of the world's greatest living footballers in 2004, and he was also elected by the International Federation of Football History & Statistics as the sixth-greatest Uruguayan player and the 24th greatest South American player of the 20th century.

== Early life ==
Francescoli was born on 12 November 1961 in Montevideo into a family of Italian and Basque origin. Since childhood, he was known as a shy and reserved person who spoke little and, in what he regarded as a virtue, was very observant, being regarded by those who knew him as very kind inside and outside football. Due to his slender frame, he was nicknamed "El Flaco" ("The Skinny One").

== Club career ==
=== Montevideo Wanderers ===
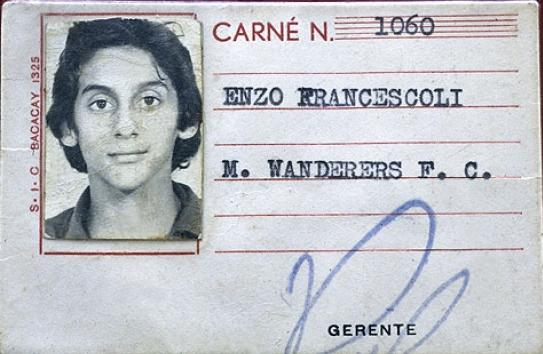
Francescoli's identity card at Montevideo Wanderers

As a young fan of Peñarol, Francescoli passed a try-out but did not join, unimpressed by the lack of playing time. Despite another successful try-out with South American powerhouse River Plate, which he would later join in 1983, he chose to stay at his high school football team while completing his studies, winning five championships.

In his last year of high school, he received an offer from his hometown club Montevideo Wanderers and joined after graduating. In 1980, he debuted with the Wanderers first team, achieving their best position since their fourth and last national title in 1931, a second-place finish. His elegant behaviour and playing style earned him the nickname "El Príncipe" ("The Prince"), a nickname inherited from Hannibal Ciocca, a former Wanderers player. He developed the habit of chewing gum during games in order to avoid dryness in his mouth. He stated he became so dependent on the habit that he did not feel right when he did not have any gum before games.

In the Uruguayan Primera División in 1981, Francescoli performed well for the team, which finished only behind Peñarol and Nacional. In February 1982, he made his debut for the Uruguay national team. Later that year, he made his Copa Libertadores debut, ironically after his worst result with the Wanderers in the national championship, a fifth-place finish.

Vying for a place with his team in the 1983 Copa Libertadores, Francescoli and his team, which included other notable players such as Jorge Barrios, Luis Alberto Acosta, Raúl Esnal and Ariel Krasouski, had a respectable season, finishing first in their group, tied with Nacional, and were only eliminated from the tournament in the quarterfinal play-off match.

=== River Plate ===
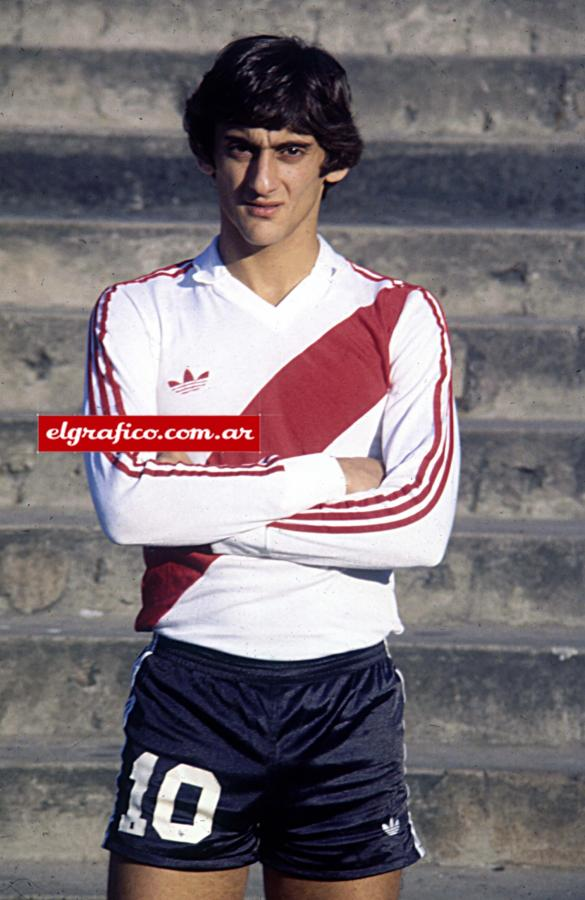
Francescoli during his first year with River Plate, 1983

After Francescoli won the 1983 Copa América with Uruguay, River Plate signed him later that year for $310,000. The following year, Francescoli was unable to show his potential, splitting time with other players. He saw more playing time towards the end of the season when the team reached the Argentine final, but was defeated 3–0 by Ferro Carril Oeste. Nevertheless, Francescoli, was voted the best South American footballer of 1984 for his performances for River Plate and the Uruguay national team, featuring alongside players such as Nelson Gutiérrez and Antonio Alzamendi, among others. Eager to excel with River Plate, Francescoli rejected an offer from América de Cali (later found to be funded by the Cali Cartel) which was doing well that year and would go on to become the Copa Libertadores runners-up between 1985 and 1987.

Although the team did not win the championship in 1985, Francescoli was voted Argentina's best player, the first foreign player to be given the honour. He finally won the Argentine title with River Plate the next season, claiming the 1985–86 Championship which had been re-established as a single tournament. He ended the season as top scorer with 25 goals, three of which came in a 5–4 victory against Argentinos Juniors for the championship match and qualified for the Copa Libertadores. In January 1986, he scored his most famous goal: a decisive bicycle kick which gave River Plate a victory over the Poland national team in a friendly tournament organized by the five largest Argentine clubs.

After winning the Argentine title, Francescoli moved to Europe, where he was signed by Racing Paris, who had just been promoted from the French Second Division. Nantes was willing to pay $2.5 million for his contract, but River Plate's president at the time, Hugo Santilli, believed Francescoli could fetch a better price.

=== RC Paris ===
Francescoli began his European career with Racing Paris in 1986, a long established team which had been in a slump since the 1950s and had recently started a rivalry with its growing neighbour, Paris Saint-Germain founded in 1970, which had won the French title the previous season. Automotive company Matra decided to sponsor the team, which resulted in the name being changed to Matra Racing in 1987. Seeking to dominate the 1993 Ligue 1, the domestic cups and qualify for the UEFA Champions League, automobile company magnate Jean-Luc Lagardère later provided funding to the club, allowing the team to sign footballers Luis Fernández, Maxime Bossis, Thierry Tusseau, David Ginola, along with Cameroonian Eugène Ekéké, Dutchman Sonny Silooy, German Pierre Littbarski and fellow Uruguayan Rubén Paz. In Francescoli's first season, the team managed to finish 13th overall in part due to Francescoli's 14 goals, which made him one of the league's top scorers that season.

Francescoli became a team idol and in 1987 was elected the best foreign player in France. For the 1987–88 season, Portuguese coach Artur Jorge, who had previously won the European Cup, was brought to the team. Francescoli would later describe Artur Jorge as the best coach he had worked with throughout his career. Matra Racing had been struggling to reach the top of the table, alternating between third and second place from the second half of the season onwards. However, after a series of matches, the team stood 11 points behind Monaco. Francescoli scored eight times in the league, finishing once again as the club's top scorer. During this period, he received an offer from Juventus due to the untimely retirement of its captain and star player Michel Platini in 1987, although Francescoli refused the offer. Francescoli finished the 1988–89 championship as the club's top scorer for the third consecutive season, and avoiding relegation.

The sub-par season of Matra Racing did not prevent Francescoli from being seen as a star worldwide. In March 1989, he earned a spot on the Uruguayan international team that played against the Brazil national team in an international friendly in Brazil that marked Zico's retirement, scoring one of his team's goals in a 2–1 victory. However, domestically he had suffered several disappointments and was frustrated by his team's lack of success in the Coupe de France. Racing soon filed for bankruptcy and left the French League, losing its spot to their financially sound cross-city rivals Paris Saint-Germain.

=== Marseille ===
Francescoli transferred to Marseille in 1989. He spent only one season with the club, where he won the 1989–90 French Division 1 title, scoring 11 goals in 28 appearances, and grabbed the attention of an important fan, Zinedine Zidane. Francescoli was sorely missed by his former team Racing, which, in his absence, was unable to avoid relegation. Ironically, Francescoli faced his former club in the semi-finals of the Coupe de France. Racing won the match, although under odd circumstances: with eight minutes remaining, Francescoli scored a goal which would have tied the match, although it was disallowed due to a technicality, and Marseille eventually lost 3–2. Francescoli also helped Marseille to the semi-finals of the 1989–90 European Cup.

=== Cagliari ===
After the 1990 World Cup in Italy, in which Uruguay had been eliminated by the hosts in the round of 16, Francescoli moved to the Italian Serie A, and along with international teammates José Herrera and Daniel Fonseca, was signed by Cagliari. He initially struggled to find form with his new club, playing in a deeper midfield role, as Cagliari fought against relegation during his first two seasons. Due to his deeper playing position, Francescoli's goalscoring output suffered, and he was far less prolific as he totalled just four goals in the 1990–91 season, and six in the 1991–92 Serie A season. Cagliari avoided relegation on both occasions, but were eliminated in the first round of the 1991–92 Coppa Italia.

Francescoli's third season in Italy was by far his best. In the Coppa Italia, he scored three goals before the team was eliminated in the quarter-finals against Fabio Capello's Milan, which conquered the league title that year. In Serie A, Cagliari earned a surprising sixth place, earning a spot in the UEFA Cup, with Francescoli scoring seven league goals, his personal best in a single Serie A season. In total, Francescoli managed 17 goals in 98 league appearances for Cagliari. Due to his key performances, he is regarded as one of the club's greatest ever players, and was included in the Cagliari Hall of Fame, and in the club's best ever starting XI.

=== Torino ===
In 1993, Francescoli accepted an offer from Turin side Torino, the most recent winner of the Coppa Italia.

The 1993 Supercoppa Italiana final was the closest Francescoli ever came to winning a trophy during his time in Italy, as Torino ultimately lost the title to Milan. With Francescoli, Torino came close to defending the title the following season, but the club was defeated by Ancona in a semi-final upset. However, the club's Serie A campaign was more heavily contested. After initially fighting against relegation, Torino climbed the table to clinch a spot in the next season's UEFA Cup, earning four points more than they needed to qualify for the tournament. In the European Cup Winners' Cup, for which they had qualified the previous season as the 1993 Italian Cup champions, Torino reached the quarter-finals, only to be eliminated by eventual champions Arsenal. Despite a successful season for the team, Francescoli did not perform as well as in previous seasons, from an individual standpoint, as he only scored three goals in 24 appearances, his lowest tally during his four seasons in the Italian league.

=== Return to River Plate ===
In 1994, at age 33, after an uninspiring season with Torino, Francescoli decided to return to Argentina to play for former team River Plate, where he had previously played his best football. Despite his age, he was determined to prove that he could still compete at the top level, and performed well in the Apertura championship with the team that year (the Argentine season returned to being divided into two separate tournaments, Apertura and Clausura, in 1990–91). The season also marked the first time River Plate had managed to become undefeated champions.

The team had a less exciting season in 1995, finishing tenth in the Clausura, and seventh in the Apertura, while suffering a semifinal elimination against Colombia's Atlético Nacional in the Copa Libertadores. The team was eventually eliminated in the semi-finals by eventual champions Independiente in the Copa Libertadores, in which Francescoli played as striker. That year, he was voted South American Player of the Year and he also received the title of Argentine Player of the Year, ten years after first receiving it.

The next year, Francescoli retired from the Celeste to devote himself entirely to River Plate at club level, recapturing his best form, scoring 19 goals in total. The 1996 season was his most important as Francescoli led a young, talented, yet inexperienced team that included Ariel Ortega, Matías Almeyda, Juan Pablo Sorín, Hernán Crespo and Marcelo Gallardo to win the 1996 Copa Libertadores title, and his second league title, briefly tying the record of 15 titles set by rivals Boca Juniors.

Francescoli finished his season with River Plate with a defeat in the 1996 Intercontinental Cup final against Italian side Juventus. River Plate had the chance to equal Boca Juniors with two Intercontinental Cup titles, but ultimately lost to the Italian side for which a fan of Francescoli played. Zinedine Zidane said, "when I saw Francescoli play, he was the player I wanted to be. He was the player that I saw and admired at Olympique de Marseille, my idol when I played against him when I was at Juventus... Enzo is like a god." At the end of the year, Francescoli decided to come out of international retirement in order to aid Uruguay in qualifying for the upcoming World Cup in France.

The following season, Francescoli suffered further disappointment, with a penalty shoot-out defeat to Racing Club at the Estadio Monumental, as River Plate were eliminated in the round of 16 of the 1997 Copa Libertadores. However, despite the early exit in the continental tournament, River Plate enjoyed much success domestically, following up their 1996 Copa Libertadores title with a fortunate treble the next year: the Clausura, Apertura and the Supercopa Libertadores.

After failing to help Uruguay qualify for the 1998 World Cup, Francescoli announced he would retire in early 1998, refusing an offer of roughly a million dollars to continue, feeling he could not play another year due to continuing injury struggles. Poor sleeping habits caused by stress had forced him to seek therapy since 1996. His last two matches for River Plate were historical as within four days they had won two titles. The first, on 17 December 1997, was the deciding second leg of the Supercopa Libertadores, against São Paulo. It was the last ever edition of the tournament, one which River Plate had never won, which presented a situation described as "now or never". The Brazilian team, who had drawn in Brazil, were beaten 2–1 at the Monumental of Núñez. Then, on 21 December, River drew 1–1 with the Argentinos Juniors at the Estádio José Amalfitani and became 1997 Apertura champions, concluding the Argentine treble having won the 1996 Apertura and 1997 Clausura), beating out arch-rivals Boca Juniors, the other contender for the title and suffering only one defeat in the league.

On 1 August 1999, Francescoli returned to the Monumental for a friendly farewell match. Sixty-five thousand spectators were present, among them President of Argentina Carlos Menem and President of Uruguay Julio María Sanguinetti, as well as some Boca Juniors fans. The match brought together the friends of River Plate with those of the club he had hoped to play for during his childhood, Peñarol, who won the match 4–0. After the match, the field was taken by thousands of children, for whom Francescoli, along with other players, signed autographs, also kicking the ball around with them.

Another River Plate legend from Uruguay, Walter Gómez, kicked off. When approaching the day of his retirement, Argentine composer Ignacio Copani dedicated his song "Inmenzo" (a pun on "Enzo") to Francescoli, ending with the crowd requesting an encore.

After his retirement, the team were only able to succeed locally for some time, failing to earn the same international respect in previous years, entering a crisis that would culminate in an unprecedented relegation in 2011 – ironically, exactly 15 years to the day after the team had won the 1996 Copa Libertadores with Francescoli. He is still the team's seventh all-time leading goalscorer, with 115 goals in 198 matches, and is the third highest foreign goalscorer in the history of Argentine football, only behind Paraguayans Arsenio Erico and Delfín Benítez Cáceres.

=== Exhibition matches ===
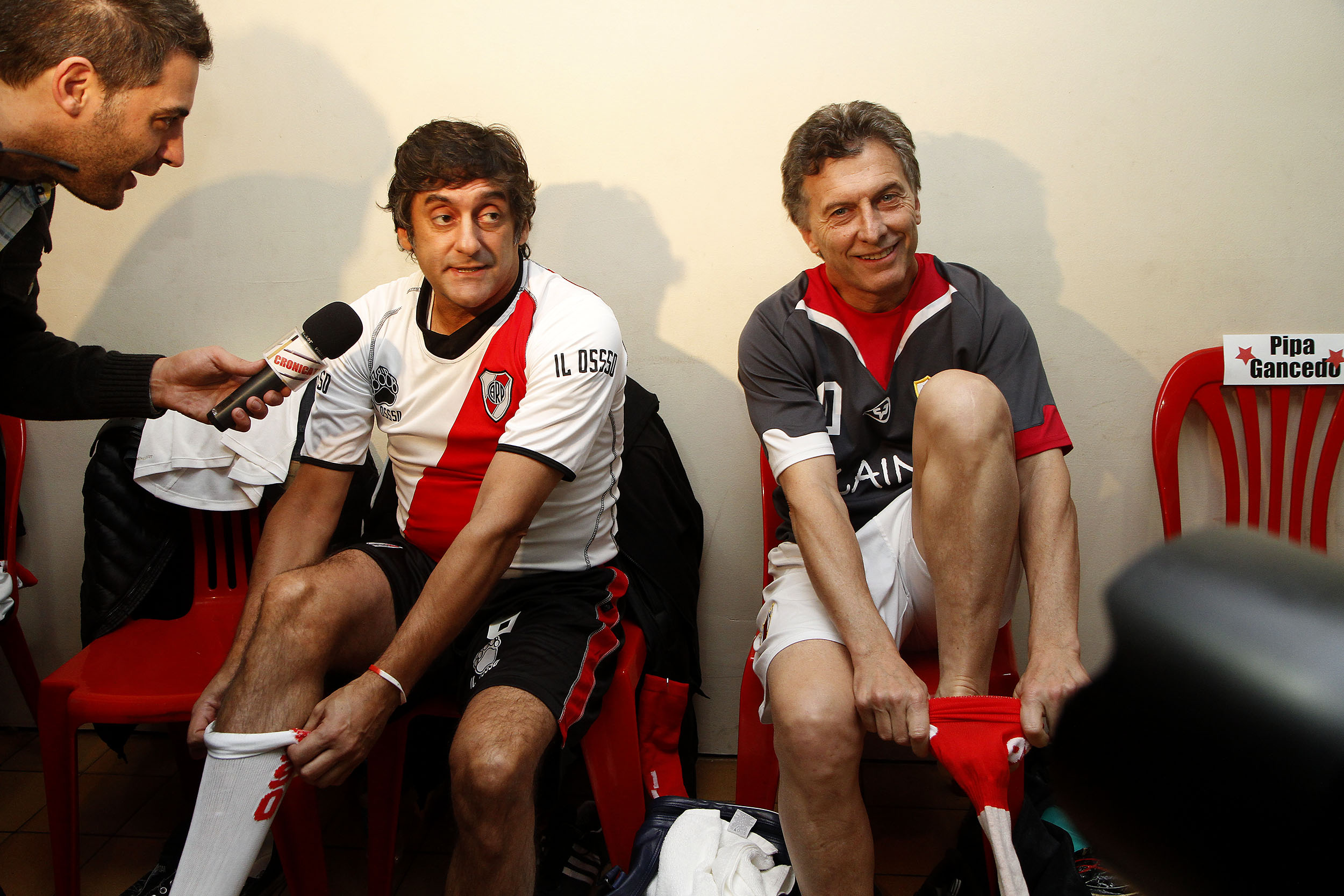
Francescoli and then Chief of Government of Buenos Aires, Mauricio Macri, in an exhibition match in 2012

Since his retirement, Francescoli has only returned to the pitch for exhibition matches, such as those commemorating the retirement of Juan Pablo Sorín, Víctor Aristizábal and Diego Maradona, considered by him to be the greatest player he has seen, and other friends. Maradona almost did not participate in the match since the River Plate fans were strongly opposed to it. "There was no problem for me. There are three things I do not discuss nor with my best friends: Religion, politics and football...things in that person, mistaken or not, advocates a cause," Francescoli said. He added, "[Y]ou'll never hear me saying 'I live and die for River Plate', though I may be much more of a fan than others." After Maradona, the second greatest player he stated he had seen was Zinedine Zidane, an opinion he admits was heavily influenced by emotional reasons, as Zidane was a big fan of Francescoli.

In July 2012, in Ariel Ortega's testimonial, Francescoli scored four goals at the age of 50, the last of which was a bicycle kick in the penalty area.

== International career ==
In 1981, one year after his professional debut, Francescoli joined the Uruguayan team that won the South American Under-20 Championship. He was named one of the best young players in the world that year, also making three appearances in the 1981 FIFA World Youth Championship. He made his debut for the senior team in 1982, competing in a friendly tournament in India. The following year, as a member of the Uruguay squad in the 1983 Copa América, he scored his first international goal in a 2–0 victory over Brazil.

Uruguay qualified for the 1986 World Cup after a close match against Chile, in a qualifying group that also included Peru. Francescoli's ability was questioned by critics. However, Uruguayan coach Omar Borrás said, "Everyone talks about Platini, Maradona, of Elkjær ... but our Francescoli has everything to be the highlight of the World Cup."

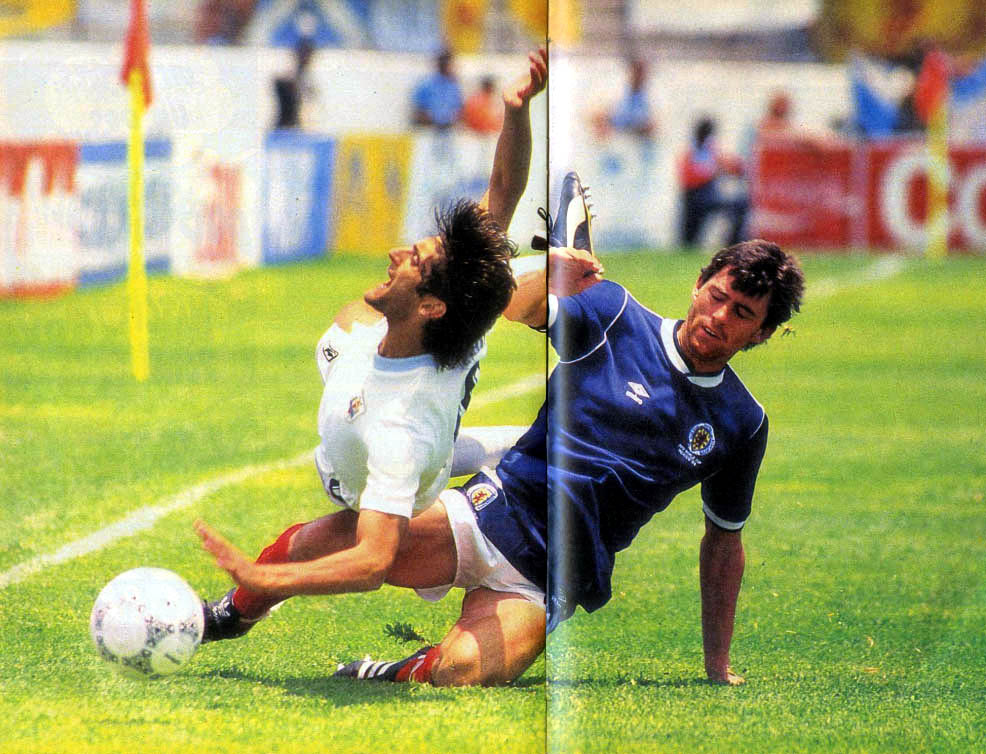
Francescoli being tackled by Scotland's David Narey at the 1986 FIFA World Cup

However, Uruguay's performance in the tournament were less than stellar. The team earned two draws and two defeats, advancing to the second round only as one of the best third-placed teams, while Francescoli only scored once throughout the entire tournament, in an infamous 1–6 defeat to Denmark in the first round. This tournament was seen by Francescoli as his worst performance in his entire career. He stated in an interview, "[T]he only thing I ask is forgiveness from all Uruguayans." Uruguay ultimately fell in the round of 16, following a 1–0 defeat to the eventual champions Argentina, led by eventual Golden Ball winner Diego Maradona.

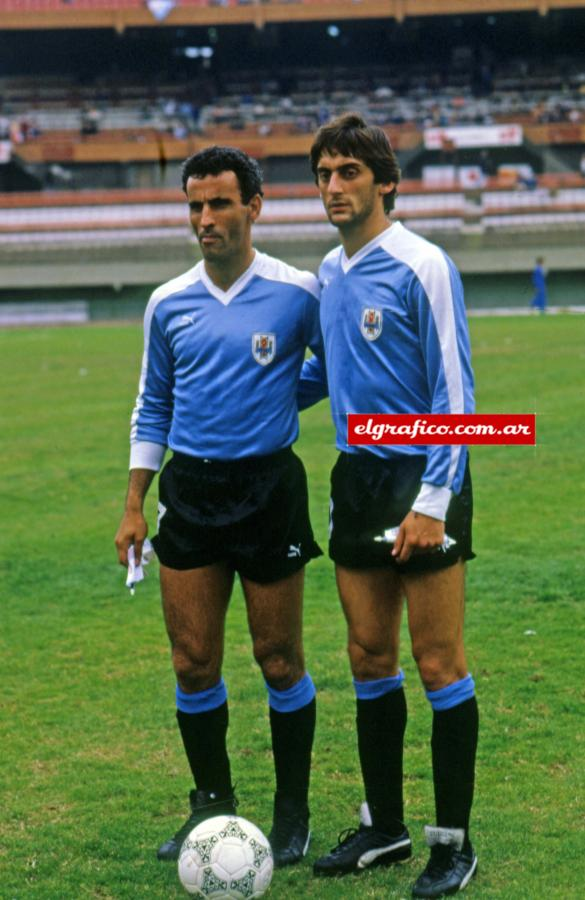
Francescoli and Antonio Alzamendi with Uruguay in the 1987 Copa América

The disappointment was assuaged the next year with the victory of the 1987 Copa América as defending champions. Francescoli shone for Uruguay in the semi-final against hosts and defending World Cup champions Argentina in the Estadio Monumental de Núñez (the stadium of his former club, River Plate). A win against Chile in the final of the tournament followed, and the victory gave Uruguay their record 13th continental title.

Two years later in the 1989 Copa América, Francescoli played in four of five matches, winning three and helping Uruguay to reach the final round for the third consecutive time. The final match was played against hosts and favourites Brazil, coincidentally in similar circumstances to the last round of the final round of the 1950 World Cup. The match was also played on the same date, 16 July, and at the same stadium, the Maracanã. As in 1950, the Brazilians took the lead, although they were the winners on this occasion.

During the qualifiers for the 1990 World Cup, the Uruguayans once again needed to overcome several obstacles in order to seal qualification: Bolivia proved to be the toughest opponent in the group, alongside Peru. Francescoli and his teammates had the task of defeating both teams in the final two games of the qualification campaign, and succeeded, ensuring their place in the World Cup play-offs, in which they overcame Bolivia to qualify for the upcoming tournament.

In his second World Cup, Francescoli did not perform much better than in the previous tournament. Although many analysts regarded him as one of the potential stars of the tournament due to his talent and ability to be decisive for his team, Uruguay again did not fare very well, earning only one win in a 1–0 group stage victory over South Korea, once again advancing to the second round as one of the best third-placed teams. The team were eliminated in the round of 16, suffering a 2–0 defeat against hosts Italy, on this occasion, who went on to finish the tournament in third place. This was Francescoli's final World Cup. In total, he made eight World Cup appearances, scoring once and appearing in each of Uruguay's matches in both the 1986 and 1990 tournaments. Altogether, he played in eight World Cup matches, losing four, tying three and winning one.

After the 1990 World Cup, national team coach Óscar Tabárez was replaced by Luis Cubilla, who had trained the under-used Francescoli at River Plate, when Francescoli had first arrived at the club years before. Cubilla brought a strong feeling of nationalism among Uruguayan fans at the time, specifically of resentment against the country's athletes who played in Europe, and even hinted that Francescoli, and also Rubén Sosa, Carlos Aguilera and Oscar Herrera, were "dinheiristas" ("mercenaries"). Appalled, they refused to play if Cubilla did not recant his comments and these players were left out of the 1991 Copa América. Without the "European" stars, Uruguay collapsed in the first round. By the time the 1993 tournament came around, the players had already been called back to the team. Although he had been called up by Cubilla, Francescoli was benched throughout the tournament, and Uruguay once again disappointed, suffering a quarter-final elimination. In a friendly match later that year, Francescoli made his first appearance for the Celeste in many years. Meanwhile, South American rivals Argentina won both the 1991 and 1993 editions of the tournament, overtaking Uruguay as the team with the most Copa América titles (14).

Although Francescoli's role in the team was disputed during a low point in his international career, he showed he was still an important player for the national team, and appeared for Uruguay in the qualifying rounds for the 1994 World Cup. Uruguay reached the CONMEBOL Group 2 final round of the South American qualifiers, along with Bolivia, Brazil and the two wildcard teams Ecuador and Venezuela. Uruguay, Bolivia and Brazil each had ten points in the group, and Brazil and Uruguay faced each other at the Maracanã on 19 September 1993. Uruguay lost the match 2–0, as Brazil topped the group to qualify for the upcoming tournament. As Bolivia was able to earn a draw in their fixture, the Uruguayans came third in the group, failing to qualify for the competition. Although the team failed to qualify for the upcoming World Cup in the United States, Francescoli overcame one of his biggest struggles throughout his career as after two years, national team's coach Cubilla was relieved of his position. After the defeat against Brazil at the Maracanã in Uruguay's final qualification match, Cubilla had said of Francescoli, "That man is a traitor to his country, so take away his passport!" Francescoli later stated in a 2008 interview that this was a low point in his career, and that his coach's comment caused him sit in a corner of the Maracanã and cry.

The 1995 Copa América on home soil under Uruguay's new head coach, Héctor Núñez, was a breath of fresh air for Francescoli. After not featuring in the previous two editions of the tournament (although he was named to the squad in 1993, he did not play a single match), Francescoli carried his team to the Copa América final against Brazil, at the Estadio Centenario in Montevideo. Uruguay won a hard-fought final 5–3 on penalties, after a 1–1 draw, with Francescoli converting his team's first penalty, as he lifted the title for the last time. As a result, Uruguay equalled Argentina as the South American national team with the most Copa América titles (14). Uruguay later broke the record in 2011, with the victory of their 15th Copa América title. Francescoli was once again named player of the tournament, and was also elected the best player in South America, at age 34, 11 years after first receiving the honour. In the tournament, he also scored his final goal for the national team, which came in the group stage in a 1–0 win against Paraguay. In total, Francescoli made 16 appearances over four editions of the Copa América, scoring five goals, and reaching the final on all four occasions in which he played.

Francescoli announced his retirement from international football after winning the Copa América for the third time. However, he briefly came out of international retirement during Uruguay's qualifying campaign for the 1998 World Cup, after his teammates had persuaded him to return, with President of Uruguay Julio María Sanguinetti also asking him personally. In October 1996, Francescoli returned to play for the national team, although he did not take part in the 1997 Copa América. He played in eight matches in June of that year, after the continental tournament. His last two matches with the Celeste came in July and August 1997. The Uruguayans still had three World Cup South American qualifying matches remaining, but reached the last match with no mathematical chance of qualifying for the tournament and finishing seventh in their group.

Francescoli made 73 official appearances for his country, with 37 wins, 18 draws and 18 defeats, and scoring 17 goals. He was praised for his performances in a difficult period for the national team, retiring as the player with the second most appearances for Uruguay, only four games behind the record holder at the time, goalkeeper Rodolfo Rodríguez, despite the three years in which he had been disowned by the national side, and another in which he had voluntarily retired. Later, his record would be broken by goalkeeper Fabián Carini and also by striker Diego Forlán.

== Style of play and legacy ==
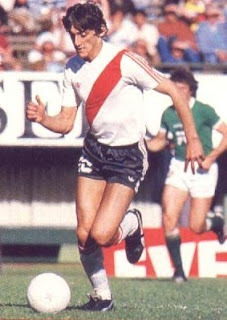
Francescoli in 1984

A quick, elegant, creative and technically gifted attacking midfielder who was also capable of playing in the centre as a forward, Francescoli was noted in particular for his control, grace, fluidity, dribbling skills and ability on the ball, despite his lack of notable pace; one of his trademark moves was the roulette. A two-footed playmaker with excellent vision, passing ability, and an eye for goal from midfield, he was also known for his ability from set-pieces, and also had a penchant for scoring acrobatic goals from overhead kicks. These feints and qualities would later influence the style of French creative offensive midfielder Zinedine Zidane, who has stated that, along with compatriot Michel Platini, Francescoli was one of his favourite players as a young boy, and that he would often watch him train with Marseille. Zidane even named one of his sons, Enzo, in homage to him. Francescoli learned of this fact just before the Intercontinental Cup final match of 1996 between River Plate and Juventus, and so the two players swapped jerseys at the end of the match, with Zidane claiming that he would sleep with the jersey. The piece became a favourite of Zidane's to wear. Subsequently, the two presented television show Football Cracks, a reality show that sought new football talent in Spain. Francescoli's admiration for Zidane extended to other French players and he has stated he felt more respect from French fans than he had while playing there.

Other players to have been named after him are Argentine internationals Enzo Pérez and Enzo Fernández, both of whom have also played for River Plate. Argentine striker Diego Milito has also been given the nickname "Il Principe" during Milito's tenure with Inter Milan due to his elegant style of play and physical resemblance to Francescoli. Francescoli has joked saying that neither of his sons resemble him as much as Milito, both in physical appearance and in their walk. Furthermore, Argentine attacking midfielder Javier Pastore, who was also a fan of Francescoli as a youngster, was given the Uruguayan's other nickname "El Flaco", because of their similar style of play as well as their slender build.

Francescoli is considered to be one of the best players of his generation, as well as one of the greatest Uruguayan and South American players of all time. In recognition of his talent, Francescoli was the only Uruguayan footballer to be named by Pelé as one of the top 125 greatest living footballers in March 2004. He was also elected by the International Federation of Football History & Statistics as the sixth-greatest Uruguayan player and the 24th greatest South American player of the 20th century, and as the 80th Greatest Footballer of the 20th Century by World Soccer. He is also considered to be one of Cagliari's and River Plate's greatest players ever. Despite his ability, however, he was also known to be inconsistent.

== Media career ==
Francescoli went to live with his family in Miami, where he would create TV station GOL TV with former manager Paco Casal. Francescoli returned to Buenos Aires five years later, although he still travelled monthly to the United States because of his activities there. For the 2010 World Cup, he led the team of Channel 7 Argentina, Argentina's state broadcaster.

== Coaching career ==
Since leaving television, Francescoli was asked several times to coach River Plate, but he never accepted, stating instead that if asked to be manager of the club, he might accept, since he could employ the lessons that had learned as an entrepreneur.

However, one factor that prevented him from having more acceptance in Uruguay was his relationship with Paco Casal. There was controversy in Uruguay over his buying football television rights through his company Tenfield SA. A known critic said, "The contract with Tenfield SA... has been detrimental to Uruguayan football. Players earn ever lower wages, clubs are bankrupt, but entrepreneurs are getting richer. Only journalists who support the contractual relationship between the AUF and Tenfield are those who work for the company, which has a monopoly in the country." Francescoli said of Casal, "He is the most important businessman in my country, and built [his power] from nothing. He is involved in things that generate passion for football and carnival, and this creates divisions [of opinions]... he is a good person. The man helps more than people believe. Paco did not get up one day and said, 'I want to be owner of Uruguayan football.' Paco was given ownership because the leaders were not able to sell the players that they developed."

=== River Plate ===
After many wins, titles and trophies with River Plate as a player, Francescoli was back with the club in a leadership role under Rodolfo Raúl D'Onofrio. Francescoli became the head of player personnel for River Plate. It was his decision to bring on a young coach and former River Plate teammate Marcelo Gallardo after the departure of Ramón Díaz. After hiring Gallardo, River Plate had immense international success, as the team conquered all continental CONMEBOL trophies: the Copa Sudamericana 2014, Recopa Sudamericana 2015 and the Copa Libertadores 2015. River Plate also won the first Suruga Bank Championship 2015. Under his leadership and Gallardo's touch, River Plate won the Copa Libertadores 2018, beating their life-long rivals Boca Juniors.

== Personal life ==
Francescoli has been married to Mariela Yern since 1984 and has two sons with her, Bruno and Marco. His wife is a psychologist, which he stated was of great value to their marriage. As a footballer, he required emotional sympathy, he stated in an interview program in 2000. Bruno studied law, while Marco tried to follow in his father's footsteps, eventually playing for Cagliari, where he played for three years, and then Estudiantes de La Plata, but did not get much further. One factor for his retirement from football was his desire to be closer to his two sons. Francescoli has two brothers: Luis Ernesto, two years older; and Pablo, 13 years younger. Outside of football, he also enjoys smoking, a habit that he has had since age 16, and playing golf.

Francescoli was made the Uruguayan ambassador for UNICEF after Diego Forlán in 2002.

== Career statistics ==
=== Club ===
Appearances and goals by club, season and competition
Season	Club	League	League		National cup		League cup		Continental		Other		Total	
Season	Club	League	Apps	Goals	Apps	Goals	Apps	Goals	Apps	Goals	Apps	Goals	Apps	Goals
Montevideo Wanderers	1980	Uruguayan Primera División	26	3	—		—		—		—		26	3
Montevideo Wanderers	1981	Uruguayan Primera División	22	7	—		—		—		—		22	7
Montevideo Wanderers	1982	Uruguayan Primera División	26	10	—		—		—		—		26	10
Montevideo Wanderers	Total		74	20	0	0	0	0	0	0	0	0	74	20
River Plate	1983	Argentine Primera División	27	11	—		—		—		—		27	11
River Plate	1984	Argentine Primera División	49	29	—		—		—		—		49	29
River Plate	1985	Argentine Primera División	5	3	—		—		—		—		5	3
River Plate	1985–86	Argentine Primera División	32	25	—		—		—		—		32	25
River Plate	Total		113	68	0	0	0	0	0	0	0	0	113	68
RC Paris	1986–87	French Division 1	35	14	1	0	—		—		—		36	14
RC Paris	1987–88	French Division 1	28	8	1	0	—		—		—		29	8
RC Paris	1988–89	French Division 1	26	10	2	0	—		—		—		28	10
RC Paris	Total		89	32	4	0	0	0	0	0	0	0	93	32
Marseille	1989–90	French Division 1	28	11	4	0	—		8	0	—		40	11
Cagliari	1990–91	Serie A	33	4			—		—		—		33	4
Cagliari	1991–92	Serie A	33	6	1	0	—		—		—		34	6
Cagliari	1992–93	Serie A	32	7			—		—		—		32	7
Cagliari	Total		98	17	1	0	0	0	0	0	0	0	99	17
Torino	1993–94	Serie A	24	3	6	2	—		3	0	1 (Note: Appearance in 1993 Supercoppa Italiana)	0	34	5
River Plate	1994–95	Argentine Primera División	27	17	—		—		11	6	—		38	23
River Plate	1995–96	Argentine Primera División	20	10	—		—		19	13	—		39	23
River Plate	1996–97	Argentine Primera División	31	19	—		—		2	1	1 (Note: Appearances in 1996 Intercontinental Cup)	0	34	20
River Plate	1997–98	Argentine Primera División	6	1	—		—		4	0	—		10	1
River Plate	Total		84	47	0	0	0	0	36	20	1	0	120	67
Career total			510	198	15	2	0	0	47	20	2	0	574	220

=== International ===
Appearances and goals by national team and year
National team	Year	Apps	Goals
Uruguay	1982	4	0
Uruguay	1983	4	1
Uruguay	1984	1	0
Uruguay	1985	11	5
Uruguay	1986	6	1
Uruguay	1987	4	0
Uruguay	1988	1	2
Uruguay	1989	9	3
Uruguay	1990	6	0
Uruguay	1991	0	0
Uruguay	1992	0	0
Uruguay	1993	9	2
Uruguay	1994	0	0
Uruguay	1995	9	3
Uruguay	1996	3	0
Uruguay	1997	6	0
Total		73	17

Scores and results list Uruguay's goal tally first, score column indicates score after each Francescoli goal.

List of international goals scored by Enzo Francescoli
No.	Date	Venue	Opponent	Score	Result	Competition
–	17 February 1982	Eden Gardens, Calcutta, India	Yugoslavia	1–0	1–0	Unofficial match (Nehru Cup)
–	28 February 1982	Eden Gardens, Calcutta, India	Italy	2–0	3–2	Unofficial match (Nehru Cup)
1	27 October 1983	Estadio Centenario, Montevideo, Uruguay	Brazil	1–0	2–0	1983 Copa América
2	29 January 1985	Estadio Centenario, Montevideo, Uruguay	East Germany	1–0	3–0	Friendly
3	3 February 1985	Estadio Centenario, Montevideo, Uruguay	Paraguay	1–0	1–0	Artigas Cup
4	6 February 1985	Estadio Félix Capriles, Cochabamba, Bolivia	Bolivia	1–0	1–0	Friendly
5	24 February 1985	Estadio Centenario, Montevideo, Uruguay	Colombia	2–0	3–0	Friendly
6	31 March 1985	Estadio Olímpico Atahualpa, Quito, Ecuador	Ecuador	2–0	2–0	1986 World Cup qualification
7	8 June 1986	Estadio Neza 86, Nezahualcóyotl, Mexico	Denmark	1–2	1–6	1986 FIFA World Cup
8.	14 December 1988	Estadio Centenario, Montevideo, Uruguay	Peru	1–0	3–0	MUFP Cup
9	14 December 1988	Estadio Centenario, Montevideo, Uruguay	Peru	2–0	3–0	MUFP Cup
10	6 July 1989	Estádio Serra Dourada, Goiânia, Brazil	Chile	3–0	3–0	1989 Copa América
11	12 July 1989	Estádio do Maracanã, Rio de Janeiro, Brazil	Paraguay	1–0	3–0	1989 Copa América
12	17 September 1989	Estadio Centenario, Montevideo, Uruguay	Bolivia	2–0	2–0	1990 World Cup qualification
13	8 August 1993	Estadio Hernando Siles, La Paz, Bolivia	Bolivia	1–3	1–3	1994 World Cup qualification
14	12 September 1993	Estadio Centenario, Montevideo, Uruguay	Bolivia	1–0	2–1	1994 World Cup qualification
15	28 June 1995	Estadio Atilio Paiva Olivera, Rivera, Uruguay	New Zealand	1–1	2–2	Friendly
16	5 July 1995	Estadio Centenario, Montevideo, Uruguay	Venezuela	3–1	4–1	1995 Copa América
17	9 July 1995	Estadio Centenario, Montevideo, Uruguay	Paraguay	1–0	1–0	1995 Copa América

== Honours ==
River Plate

- Primera División: 1985–86, 1994 Apertura, 1996 Apertura, 1997 Clausura, 1997 Apertura
- Copa Libertadores: 1996
- Supercopa Sudamericana: 1997

Marseille

- French Division 1: 1989–90

Uruguay

- South American Youth Football Championship: 1981
- Copa América: 1983, 1987, 1995

Individual

- Copa América player of the tournament: 1983, 1995
- South American Footballer of the Year: 1984, 1995
- Argentine Primera División top scorers: 1984 Metropolitano, 1985–86, 1994 Apertura
- Player of the Year of Argentina: 1985, 1995
- French Division 1 Foreign Player of the Year: 1987
- South American Team of the Year: 1994, 1995, 1996, 1997
- FIFA 100
- World Soccer: The 100 Greatest Footballers of the 20th Century (#80)
- Cagliari Hall of Fame
- Cagliari Greatest All-time Starting XI
- IFFHS Uruguayan Men's Dream Team
- IFFHS Legends
