= 1995 Copa América =

Tournament details
- Host country: Uruguay
- Dates: 5–23 July
- Teams: 12 (from 2 confederations)
- Venues: 4 (in 4 host cities)

Final positions
- Champions: Uruguay (14th title)
- Runners-up: Brazil
- Third place: Colombia
- Fourth place: United States

Tournament statistics
- Matches played: 26
- Goals scored: 69 (2.65 per match)
- Attendance: 450,600 (17,331 per match)
- Top scorer(s): (Argentina) Gabriel Batistuta (Mexico) Luis García (4 goals each)
- Best player: (Uruguay) Enzo Francescoli

The 1995 Copa América football tournament was staged in Uruguay. The host country, Uruguay, won it for a record-tying 14th time by beating Brazil 5–3 in the penalty shootout after a 1–1 draw in the final. All 10 CONMEBOL members took part, with Mexico and the United States invited in order to reach 12 teams.

The United States was the surprise of the tournament, beating defending champions Argentina 3–0 and winning the group. The United States went on to defeat Mexico on penalties in the second round but then lost to Brazil 1–0 in the semi-finals. They then fell to Colombia 4–1 in the third-place game, finishing fourth overall.

In this edition of the tournament, extra time was not played if a match was drawn after 90 minutes. Instead it went straight to a penalty shootout.

== Venues ==
1995 Copa América is located in Uruguay	Montevideo	Rivera
1995 Copa América is located in Uruguay	Estadio Centenario	Estadio Atilio Paiva Olivera
1995 Copa América is located in Uruguay	Capacity: 65,235	Capacity: 30,000
1995 Copa América is located in Uruguay	34.894661°S 56.15284°W	30.908521°S 55.548377°W
1995 Copa América is located in Uruguay	Paysandú	Maldonado
1995 Copa América is located in Uruguay	Estadio Parque Artigas	Estadio Domingo Burgueño
1995 Copa América is located in Uruguay	Capacity: 25,000	Capacity: 22,000
1995 Copa América is located in Uruguay	32.322961°S 58.072593°W	34.914564°S 54.954815°W

== Squads ==
For a complete list of all participating squads: 1995 Copa América squads

== Match officials ==
Argentina

- Javier Castrilli

Bolivia

- Pablo Peña

Brazil

- Márcio Rezende de Freitas

Chile

- Salvador Imperatore

Colombia

- Óscar Ruiz

Ecuador

- Alfredo Rodas

Mexico

- Marco Antonio Rodríguez
- Arturo Brizio Carter

Paraguay

- Félix Benegas

Peru

- Alberto Tejada

Uruguay

- Ernesto Filippi
- Eduardo Dluzniewski

United States

- Raúl Domínguez

Venezuela

- Paolo Borgosano

== Group stage ==
The teams were divided into three groups of four teams each.

Each team plays one match against each of the other teams within the same group. Three points are awarded for a win, one point for a draw and zero points for a defeat.

First and second placed teams, in each group, advance to the quarter-finals. The best third placed team and the second best third placed team, also advance to the quarter-finals.

- Tie-breaker
  - If teams finish leveled on points, the following tie-breakers are used:
  1. greater goal difference in all group games;
  2. greater number of goals scored in all group games;
  3. winner of the head-to-head match between the teams in question;
  4. drawing of lots.

Key to colors in group tables
Group winners, runners-up, and best two third-placed teams advance to the quarter-finals

=== Group A ===
Team	Pld	W	D	L	GF	GA	GD	Pts
Uruguay	3	2	1	0	6	2	+4	7
Paraguay	3	2	0	1	5	4	+1	6
Mexico	3	1	1	1	5	4	+1	4
Venezuela	3	0	0	3	4	10	−6	0

5 July 1995

Uruguay	4–1	Venezuela
Fonseca 14'; Otero 25'; Francescoli 75' (pen.); Poyet 84'	Report	Dolgetta 53'

Estadio Centenario, Montevideo
Attendance: 32,000
Referee: Imperatore (Chile)

6 July 1995

Paraguay	2–1	Mexico
Cardozo 63'; Samaniego 73'		García 44'

Estadio Campus Municipal, Maldonado
Attendance: 5,000
Referee: Rodas (Ecuador)

9 July 1995

Uruguay	1–0	Paraguay
Francescoli 13'	Report

Estadio Centenario, Montevideo
Attendance: 45,000
Referee: Rezende (Brazil)

9 July 1995

Mexico	3–1	Venezuela
García 41' (pen.), 57' (pen.); Espinoza 76'		Campos 65' (o.g.)

Estadio Campus Municipal, Maldonado
Attendance: 700
Referee: Domínguez (United States)

12 July 1995

Paraguay	3–2	Venezuela
Cardozo 35'; Villamayor 64'; Gamarra 83'		Miranda 13'; Dolgetta 68'

Estadio Campus Municipal, Maldonado
Attendance: 2,000
Referee: Ruiz (Colombia)

13 July 1995

Uruguay	1–1	Mexico
Saralegui 79'		García 67'

Estadio Centenario, Montevideo
Attendance: 15,000
Referee: Castrilli (Argentina)

=== Group B ===
Team	Pld	W	D	L	GF	GA	GD	Pts
Brazil	3	3	0	0	6	0	+6	9
Colombia	3	1	1	1	2	4	−2	4
Ecuador	3	1	0	2	2	3	−1	3
Peru	3	0	1	2	2	5	−3	1

7 July 1995

Colombia	1–1	Peru
Asprilla 68'		Palacios 80'

Estadio Atilio Paiva Olivera, Rivera
Attendance: 8,000
Referee: Filippi (Uruguay)

7 July 1995

Brazil	1–0	Ecuador
Ronaldão 73'

Estadio Atilio Paiva Olivera, Rivera
Attendance: 20,000
Referee: Castrilli (Argentina)

10 July 1995

Colombia	1–0	Ecuador
Rincón 44'

Estadio Atilio Paiva Olivera, Rivera
Attendance: 4,000
Referee: Peña (Bolivia)

10 July 1995

Brazil	2–0	Peru
Zinho 77' (pen.); Edmundo 82'

Estadio Atilio Paiva Olivera, Rivera
Attendance: 20,000
Referee: Benegas (Paraguay)

13 July 1995

Ecuador	2–1	Peru
Díaz 61'; Mora 75'		I. Hurtado 82' (o.g.)

Estadio Atilio Paiva Olivera, Rivera
Attendance: 10,000
Referee: Dluzniewski (Uruguay)

13 July 1995

Brazil	3–0	Colombia
Leonardo 30'; Túlio 76'; Higuita 85' (o.g.)

Estadio Atilio Paiva Olivera, Rivera
Attendance: 15,000
Referee: Filippi (Uruguay)

=== Group C ===
Team	Pld	W	D	L	GF	GA	GD	Pts
United States	3	2	0	1	5	2	+3	6
Argentina	3	2	0	1	6	4	+2	6
Bolivia	3	1	1	1	4	4	0	4
Chile	3	0	1	2	3	8	−5	1

8 July 1995

United States	2–1	Chile
Wynalda 14', 20'		Rozental 63'

Estadio Parque Artigas, Paysandú
Attendance: 16,000
Referee: Tejada (Peru)

8 July 1995

Argentina	2–1	Bolivia
Batistuta 70'; Balbo 81'		Angola 75'

Estadio Parque Artigas, Paysandú
Attendance: 20,000
Referee: Dluzniewski (Uruguay)

11 July 1995

Bolivia	1–0	United States
Etcheverry 23'

Estadio Parque Artigas, Paysandú
Attendance: 8,000
Referee: Borgosano (Venezuela)

11 July 1995

Argentina	4–0	Chile
Batistuta 1', 51'; Simeone 6'; Balbo 54'

Estadio Parque Artigas, Paysandú
Attendance: 17,000
Referee: Carter (Mexico)

14 July 1995

Bolivia	2–2	Chile
Mercado 78'; Ramos 87'		Basay 55', 61'

Estadio Parque Artigas, Paysandú
Attendance: 11,000
Referee: Tejada (Peru)

14 July 1995

United States	3–0	Argentina
Klopas 20'; Lalas 31'; Wynalda 58'

Estadio Parque Artigas, Paysandú
Attendance: 12,000
Referee: Rezende (Brazil)

=== Ranking of third-placed teams ===
At the end of the first stage, a comparison was made between the third-placed teams of each group. The two third-placed teams with the best results advanced to the quarter-finals.

Group	Team	Pld	W	D	L	GF	GA	GD	Pts
A	Mexico	3	1	1	1	5	4	+1	4
C	Bolivia	3	1	1	1	4	4	0	4
B	Ecuador	3	1	0	2	2	3	−1	3

== Knockout stage ==
Quarter-finals
16 July – Montevideo
Colombia	1 (5)
Paraguay	1 (4)
16 July – Montevideo
Uruguay	2
Bolivia	1
17 July – Paysandú
United States	0 (4)
Mexico	0 (1)
17 July – Rivera
Brazil	2 (4)
Argentina	2 (2)

Semi-finals
19 July – Montevideo
Colombia	0
Uruguay	2
20 July – Maldonado
United States	0
Brazil	1

Final
23 July – Montevideo
Uruguay	1 (5)
Brazil	1 (3)
Third place
22 July – Maldonado
Colombia	4
United States	1

=== Quarter-finals ===
16 July 1995

Colombia	1–1	Paraguay
Rincón 53'		Villamayor 26'
Penalties
Rincón (penalty scored); Mendoza (penalty scored); Arboleda (penalty scored); Cabrera (penalty scored); Asprilla (penalty scored)	5–4	(penalty scored) Jara; (penalty scored) Acuña; (penalty scored) Samaniego; (penalty scored) Denis; (penalty missed) Gamarra

Estadio Centenario, Montevideo
Attendance: 25,000
Referee: Imperatore (Chile)

16 July 1995

Uruguay	2–1	Bolivia
Otero 1'; Fonseca 30'		Sánchez 71'

Estadio Centenario, Montevideo
Attendance: 40,000
Referee: Rodas (Ecuador)

17 July 1995

United States	0–0	Mexico
Penalties
Wynalda (penalty scored); Moore (penalty scored); Caligiuri (penalty scored); Klopas (penalty scored)	4–1	(penalty scored) García; (penalty missed) Hermosillo; (penalty missed) Coyote

Estadio Parque Artigas, Paysandú
Attendance: 6,500
Referee: Ruiz (Colombia)

17 July 1995

Brazil	2–2	Argentina
Edmundo 9'; Túlio 81'		Balbo 2'; Batistuta 29'
Penalties
Roberto Carlos (penalty scored); Túlio (penalty scored); André Cruz (penalty missed); Dunga (penalty scored); Edmundo (penalty scored)	4–2	(penalty scored) Pérez; (penalty scored) Acosta; (penalty missed) Simeone; (penalty missed) Fabbri

Estadio Atilio Paiva Olivera, Rivera
Attendance: 18,000
Referee: Tejada (Peru)

=== Semi-finals ===
19 July 1995

Uruguay	2–0	Colombia
Adinolfi 51'; Otero 70'

Estadio Centenario, Montevideo
Attendance: 25,000
Referee: Benegas (Paraguay)

20 July 1995

Brazil	1–0	United States
Aldair 13'

Estadio Campus Municipal, Maldonado
Attendance: 8,000
Referee: Rodas (Ecuador)

=== Third-place match ===
22 July 1995
21:10 (UTC-3)

Colombia	4–1	United States
Quiñónez 30'; Valderrama 38'; Asprilla 50'; Rincón 76'		Moore 52' (pen.)

Estadio Campus Municipal, Maldonado
Attendance: 2,500
Referee: Imperatore (Chile)

=== Final ===
23 July 1995
17:00 (UTC-3)

Uruguay	1–1	Brazil
Bengoechea 51'	Report	Túlio 30'
Penalties
Francescoli (penalty scored); Bengoechea (penalty scored); Herrera (penalty scored); Gutiérrez (penalty scored); Martínez (penalty scored)	5–3	(penalty scored) Roberto Carlos; (penalty scored) Zinho; (penalty missed) Túlio; (penalty scored) Dunga

Estadio Centenario, Montevideo
Attendance: 64,900
Referee: Brizio Carter (Mexico)

== Result ==
1995 Copa América champions

Uruguay
14th title

== Goalscorers ==
With four goals, Gabriel Batistuta and Luis García both ended the tournament as top scorers. There were 69 goals scored in 26 matches, for an average of 2.65 goals per match.

4 goals

- (Argentina) Gabriel Batistuta
- (Mexico) Luis García

3 goals

- (Argentina) Abel Balbo
- (Brazil) Túlio
- (Colombia) Freddy Rincón
- (United States) Eric Wynalda
- (Uruguay) Marcelo Otero

2 goals

- (Brazil) Edmundo
- (Chile) Ivo Basay
- (Colombia) Faustino Asprilla
- (Paraguay) José Cardozo
- (Paraguay) Juan Villamayor
- (Uruguay) Daniel Fonseca
- (Uruguay) Enzo Francescoli
- (Venezuela) José Luis Dolgetta

1 goal

- (Argentina) Diego Simeone
- (Bolivia) Demetrio Angola
- (Bolivia) Marco Etcheverry
- (Bolivia) Miguel Mercado
- (Bolivia) Mauricio Ramos
- (Bolivia) Carlos Sánchez
- (Brazil) Aldair
- (Brazil) Leonardo
- (Brazil) Ronaldão
- (Brazil) Zinho
- (Chile) Sebastián Rozental
- (Colombia) Luis Quiñónez
- (Colombia) Carlos Valderrama
- (Ecuador) Energio Díaz
- (Ecuador) José Mora
- (Mexico) Eduardo Espinoza
- (Paraguay) Carlos Gamarra
- (Paraguay) Adriano Samaniego
- (Peru) Roberto Palacios
- (United States) Frank Klopas
- (United States) Alexi Lalas
- (United States) Joe-Max Moore
- (Uruguay) Edgardo Adinolfi
- (Uruguay) Pablo Bengoechea
- (Uruguay) Gustavo Poyet
- (Uruguay) Marcelo Saralegui
- (Venezuela) Gabriel Miranda

1 own goal

- (Colombia) René Higuita (against Brazil)
- (Ecuador) Iván Hurtado (against Peru)
- (Mexico) Jorge Campos (against Venezuela)

== Statistics ==
Team	Pts	Pld	W	D	L	GF	GA	GD	Eff
Uruguay	14	6	4	2	0	11	4	+7	77.8%
Brazil	14	6	4	2	0	10	3	+7	77.8%
Colombia	8	6	2	2	2	7	8	-1	44.4%
Argentina	7	4	2	1	1	8	6	+2	58.3%
Paraguay	7	4	2	1	1	6	5	+1	58.3%
United States	7	6	2	1	3	6	7	-1	38.9%
Mexico	5	4	1	2	1	5	4	+1	41.7%
Bolivia	4	4	1	1	2	5	6	-1	33.3%
Ecuador	3	3	1	0	2	2	3	-1	33.3%
Peru	1	3	0	1	2	2	5	-3	25.0%
Chile	1	3	0	1	2	3	8	-5	25.0%
Venezuela	0	3	0	0	3	4	10	-6	0.0%
