= Demetrio Angola =

Bolivian football striker (born 1965)

Personal information
- Full name: Demetrio Angola Landeveris
- Date of birth: 22 June 1965 (age 61)
- Place of birth: Coripata, Bolivia
- Position: Striker

Senior career*
Years	Team	Apps	(Gls)
1988	Bolívar		
- Chaco Petrolero
1990–1996	Jorge Wilstermann		
1997–1999	The Strongest		
- San José
2002	Jorge Wilstermann		
- Mariscal Braun

International career
1995–1997	Bolivia	16	(2)
- * Club domestic league appearances and goals as of 22:00, 29 June 2011 (UTC)

Demetrio Angola Landeveris (born June 22, 1965, in Coripata) is a Bolivian retired football striker.

== Club career ==
He started his career at Bolívar but spent most of his career playing for Club Jorge Wilstermann.

== International career ==
Angola played at the 1995 Copa América for the Bolivia national team. He wore the No.7 shirt and scored a goal against Argentina in a 2–1 defeat in the first round. He represented his country in 3 FIFA World Cup qualification matches.

== Personal life ==
Angola now is a senior officer in the Bolivian Naval Force. He is married to Patricia Antezana Ovando and has two children.

List of international goals scored by Demetrio Angola
No.	Date	Venue	Opponent	Score	Result	Competition	Ref.
1	18 June 1995	Estadio José Alberto Pérez, Valera, Venezuela	Venezuela	2–1	3–1	Friendly	
2	8 July 1995	Estadio Parque Artigas, Paysandú, Uruguay	Argentina	1–1	1–2	1995 Copa America	
