= Luis Quiñones =

Luis Quiñones may refer to:

- Luis Quiñones de Benavente (1581–1651), Spanish entremesista
- Luis Quiñones (baseball) (born 1962), Puerto Rican baseball player
- Luis Quiñones (baseball, born 1997)
- Luis Quiñones (footballer) (born 1991), Colombian footballer
- Luis Quiñones (weightlifter) (born 2001), Colombian weightlifter

== See also ==
- Luis Quiñonez (disambiguation)
