= Steve Maskrey =

Scottish footballer

Personal information
- Full name: Stephen William Maskrey
- Date of birth: 16 August 1962 (age 64)
- Place of birth: Edinburgh, Scotland
- Position: Striker

Senior career*
Years	Team	Apps	(Gls)
1984–1986	East Stirlingshire	58	(24)
1986–1987	Queen of the South	43	(4)
1987–1994	St Johnstone	174	(39)
1994–1996	Kilmarnock	52	(5)
1996–1997	Partick Thistle	31	(2)
1997–1998	Livingston	14	(1)
1998	→ Cowdenbeath (loan)	5	(0)
Total		348	(75)
- * Club domestic league appearances and goals

Stephen William Maskrey (born 16 August 1962 in Edinburgh) is a Scottish former professional footballer.

A striker, Maskrey began his career with East Stirlingshire in 1984. He remained at Firs Park for two years, making 58 league appearances and scoring 24 goals. In 1986, he joined Queen of the South, for whom he made 43 appearances and scored four goals.

Then-St Johnstone manager Alex Totten came in for Maskrey's services in 1987, and Maskrey repaid him with 39 goals in 174 appearances for the Perth club. After seven years at Muirton Park, firstly, and then McDiarmid Park, Maskrey followed Totten to Kilmarnock in 1994. His goals return at Rugby Park was not as prolific, with just five goals in 52 league appearances.

In 1996, he joined Partick Thistle, where he made 31 league appearances in twelve months scoring two goals). He left Partick in August 1997 and signed with Livingston, but his stay at the new Almondvale Stadium was again just a year, and he retired from playing in 1998.
