= Tenfield =

Tenfield S.A.
- Country: Uruguay
- Broadcast area: South America
- Affiliates: GOL TV
- Headquarters: Montevideo, Uruguay

Programming
- Language: Spanish
- Picture format: 480i (SDTV); 1080i (HDTV)

Ownership
- Owner: Francisco "Paco" Casal

Links
- Website: http://tenfield.com.uy/

Tenfield is a broadcasting corporation which holds the commercial rights to broadcast the Uruguayan football and basketball. It was founded in 1998 by the Uruguayan business-men Francisco "Paco" Casal, and the former football players Enzo Francescoli and Nelson Gutiérrez with the objective of broadcasting the Uruguayan football league system.

It also owns Spanish-language soccer network GOL TV, which it purchased in April 2007.

== Sporting events ==
=== Football ===
- Uruguayan Primera División (not available on ESPN+ Argentina) (Four Games per Matchday live on VTV or VTV 2 and tape-delay on GOLTV)
- Uruguayan Segunda División (Two Games per Matchday live on VTV or VTV Two).
- Uruguayan Tercera División (One Game per matchday live on VTV or VTV Two)
- Argentine Primera División (only available for Uruguay) (six matches per round on VTV or GolTV)
- 2014 FIFA World Cup qualification (CONMEBOL) (only available for Uruguay) (all matches live on VTV and VTV Plus).
- UEFA Euro (only available for Uruguay).
- Copa América (only available for Uruguay).
- FIFA World Cup (32 matches are broadcast live on VTV and VTV Plus) (Only Available for Uruguay).
- Uruguay national football team internacional friendly matches of home and away
- International friendly matches.
- VTV Sports Cup
- Rio de Janeiro State Championship
- São Paulo State Championship

=== Tennis ===
- Davis Cup

=== Basketball ===
- Uruguayan Basketball League
- NBA
- FIBA Americas Championship (only available for Uruguay)

=== Cycling ===
- Rutas de América

=== Futsal ===
- Liga Nacional de Futsal (only available for Uruguay)

=== Handball ===
- Uruguayan League

=== Motor Sports ===
- Uruguayan Rally,
- Formula One, (Only 9 races that are broadcast live on VTV and tape-delay on VTV Plus)

=== Special events ===
- Summer Olympic Games
- Pan American Games
- Uruguayan Carnival

== Original Programming in co-production with Tenfield ==
=== Televisión ===
- Pasión Fútbol (Presented by Sergio Gorzy, Juan Carlos Scelza, Martin Charquero and Alberto Kesman) (Sunday at 22:00 on VTV)
- K-Pos (Monday at 10:00 pm on VTV)
- Sin Límite (Presented by Javier Máximo Goñi) (Monday to Friday at 18:00 live on VTV Plus)
- RR GOL (Presented by Rodrigo Romano) (Monday at 21:00 on VTV Plus)
- El Ascenso (Presented by Marcos Vitette) (Tuesday at 23:00 on VTV Plus)
- Cámara Celeste
- Pasión Básquetbol (Friday at 22:00 on VTV Two)
- Pasión Voleibol (Friday at 22:00 on VTV Two)
- Pasión Handbol
- Pasión Rugby
- Pasión Futsal
