= Souza (footballer, born 1982) =

Brazilian footballer

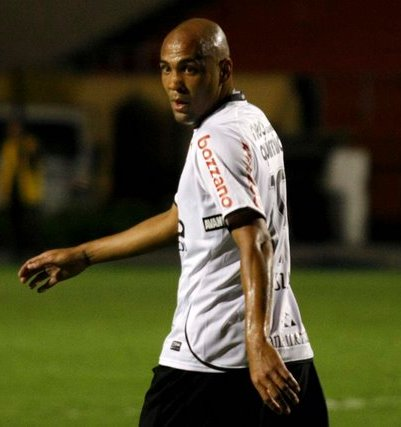

Personal information
- Full name: Rodrigo de Souza Cardoso
- Date of birth: 4 March 1982 (age 44)
- Place of birth: Rio de Janeiro, Brazil
- Height: 1.88 m (6 ft 2 in)
- Position: Striker

Youth career
- 1997: Madureira

Senior career*
Years	Team	Apps	(Gls)
1998–2000	Madureira	-	(-)
2001–2003	Vasco da Gama	30	(5)
2003	CSKA Sofia	4	(0)
2004	Marítimo	31	(8)
2005	→ Internacional (loan)	1	(0)
2005–2006	→ Goiás (loan)	63	(35)
2007–2008	Flamengo	33	(9)
2008	Panathinaikos	4	(1)
2009–2011	Corinthians	32	(6)
2011	→ Bahia (loan)	21	(11)
2012–2013	Bahia	32	(8)
2014	Vitória	5	(1)
2014	Criciúma	13	(4)
2015	Paysandu	8	(0)
2017–2018	Madureira	0	(0)
Total		277	(88)

International career
1999	Brazil U17	-	(-)
2003	Brazil U-23	2	(0)
- * Club domestic league appearances and goals as of 12 October 2021

Rodrigo de Souza Cardoso (born 4 March 1982), known as Souza, is a Brazilian former footballer who played as a striker.

== Career ==
=== Flamengo ===
After being the top goal-scorer for the 2006 Brazilian Serie A, playing for Goiás, he then moved on, signing a deal with Flamengo in the beginning of 2007.

=== Panathinaikos ===
Souza moved from Flamengo to Panathinaikos in July 2008 for a sum of €3 million. He scored his first goal for the new club in a 2008–09 UEFA Champions League qualifying round match win against Sparta Praha.

=== Corinthians ===
On 30 December 2008, Souza signed a 3-year contract for Corinthians.

=== Career statistics ===
(Correct as of January 2, 2012)

Appearances and goals by club, season and competition
Club	Season	Brazilian Série A		Brazilian Cup		Continental		State League		Total	
Club	Season	Apps	Goals	Apps	Goals	Apps	Goals	Apps	Goals	Apps	Goals
Vasco da Gama	2001	1	0	—		—		—		1	0
Vasco da Gama	2002	16	2	1	0	—		—		17	2
Vasco da Gama	2003	13	3	7	3	—		—		20	6
Vasco da Gama	Total	30	5	8	3	-	-	-	-	38	8
Internacional	2005	1	0	2	1	—		—		3	1
Internacional	Total	1	0	2	1	-	-	-	-	3	1
Goiás	2005	33	18	—		—		—		33	18
Goiás	2006	30	17	—		—		—		30	17
Goiás	Total	63	35	-	-	-	-	-	-	63	35
Flamengo	2007	22	6	—		8	3	10	6	40	15
Flamengo	2008	11	3	—		8	1	15	5	34	9
Flamengo	Total	33	9	-	-	16	4	25	11	74	24
Corinthians	2009	20	4	4	0	—		14	1	38	5
Corinthians	2010	12	2	—		5	0	9	2	26	4
Corinthians	Total	32	6	4	0	-	-	23	3	64	9
Bahia (loan)	2011	21	11	3	2	—		9	5	24	18
Bahia (loan)	Total	21	11	3	0	-	-	-	-	24	18
Career total		180	66	17	4	16	4	39	12	261	93

according to combined sources on references and

=== International career ===
Souza has won 2 international matches for Brazil U-23. He featured against Czech Republic on 16 January 2003 and then later appeared against Egypt on 20 January 2003 in the 2003 Pre-Olympic Tournament.

== Honours ==
=== Club ===
Vasco da Gama

- Rio de Janeiro State Championship: 2003

Internacional

- Rio Grande do Sul State Championship: 2005

Goiás

- Goiás State Championship: 2006

Flamengo

- Taça Guanabara: 2007, 2008
- Rio de Janeiro State Championship: 2007, 2008

Corinthians

- São Paulo State League: 2009
- Copa do Brasil: 2009

Bahia

- Bahia State League: 2012

=== National team ===
- South American Championship (U17)
- World Cup (U 17)

=== Individual ===
- Campeonato Brasileiro Série A Team of the Year: 2006
- Campeonato Brasileiro Série A top goalscorer: 2006

== Achievements ==
- Top scorer of the 1999 Sudamericano Sub-17
- Top scorer of the Brazilian League 2006
