= 1999 South American U-17 Championship =

Campeonato Sudamericano Sub-17 Uruguay 1999

Tournament details
- Host country: Uruguay
- Dates: 4 March – 21 April
- Teams: 10 (from 1 confederation)
- Venues: 3 (in 3 host cities)

Final positions
- Champions: Brazil (5th title)
- Runners-up: Paraguay
- Third place: Uruguay
- Fourth place: Argentina

Tournament statistics
- Matches played: 24
- Goals scored: 77 (3.21 per match)
- Top scorer: (Brazil) Souza (5 goals)

The 1999 South American Under-17 Football Championship was a football competition contested by all ten U-17 national football teams of CONMEBOL. The tournament was held in Uruguay between 4 and 21 March 1999, it was the 8th time the competition has been held and the 1st to take place in Uruguay.

This tournament gave three berths to the 1999 FIFA U-17 World Championship, which was held in New Zealand, Brazil won their fifth title and their third in a row. They qualified to the aforementioned tournament along with Paraguay and Uruguay.

== Venues ==
City / Town	Stadium	Capacity
Montevideo	Estadio Centenario	66,500
Maldonado	Estadio Domingo Burgueño	22,000
Rivera	Estadio Atilio Paiva Olivera	26,000

== First round ==
The 10 national teams were divided in 2 groups of 5 teams each. The top 2 teams qualified for the semi-finals.

=== Group A ===
Team	Pts	M	W	D	L	GF	GC
Uruguay	10	4	3	1	0	10	2
Argentina	7	4	2	2	0	6	2
Ecuador	5	4	1	2	1	7	4
Peru	4	4	1	1	2	2	6
Venezuela	0	4	0	0	4	3	14

6 March 1999
Argentina	2:0	Peru	Estadio Domingo Burgueño, Maldonado
Uruguay	5:2	Venezuela	Estadio Domingo Burgueño, Maldonado
8 March 1999
Argentina	2:2	Ecuador	Estadio Domingo Burgueño, Maldonado
Uruguay	3:0	Peru	Estadio Domingo Burgueño, Maldonado
10 March 1999
Peru	2:1	Venezuela	Estadio Domingo Burgueño, Maldonado
Uruguay	2:0	Ecuador	Estadio Domingo Burgueño, Maldonado
12 March 1999
Peru	0:0	Ecuador	Estadio Domingo Burgueño, Maldonado
Argentina	2:0	Venezuela	Estadio Domingo Burgueño, Maldonado
14 March 1999
Ecuador	5:0	Venezuela	Estadio Centenario, Montevideo
Uruguay	0:0	Argentina	Estadio Centenario, Montevideo

=== Group B ===
Team	Pts	M	W	D	L	GF	GC
Brazil	10	4	3	1	0	9	5
Paraguay	6	4	2	0	2	8	8
Bolivia	4	4	1	1	2	5	6
Chile	4	4	1	1	2	4	5
Colombia	4	4	1	1	2	6	8

7 March 2001
Chile	0:1	Bolivia	Estadio Atilio Paiva Olivera, Rivera
Brazil	4:3	Colombia	Estadio Atilio Paiva Olivera, Rivera
9 March 1999
Chile	3:2	Paraguay	Estadio Atilio Paiva Olivera, Rivera
Brazil	1:1	Bolivia	Estadio Atilio Paiva Olivera, Rivera
11 March 1999
Paraguay	3:2	Bolivia	Estadio Atilio Paiva Olivera, Rivera
Colombia	1:1	Chile	Estadio Atilio Paiva Olivera, Rivera
13 March 1999
Colombia	2:1	Bolivia	Estadio Atilio Paiva Olivera, Rivera
Brazil	3:1	Paraguay	Estadio Atilio Paiva Olivera, Rivera
15 March 1999
Paraguay	2:0	Colombia	Estadio Atilio Paiva Olivera, Rivera
Brazil	1:0	Chile	Estadio Atilio Paiva Olivera, Rivera

== Final round ==
Semi-finals
17 March 1999 – Estadio Centenario
Argentina	1
Brazil	3
17 March 1999 – Estadio Centenario
Uruguay	0
Paraguay	2

Final
21 March 1999 – Estadio Centenario
Brazil	5
Paraguay	0
Third place
21 March 1999 – Estadio Centenario
Argentina	2
Uruguay	4

=== Semi-finals ===
17 March 1999
Argentina	1:3	Brazil	Estadio Centenario, Montevideo
Uruguay	0:2	Paraguay	Estadio Centenario, Montevideo

=== Third place match ===
21 March 1999
Uruguay	4:2	Argentina	Estadio Centenario, Montevideo

=== Final ===
21 March 1999
Brazil	5:0	Paraguay	Estadio Centenario, Montevideo

1999 South American Under-17 Football champions

Brazil
5th title

== Countries to participate in 1999 FIFA U-17 World Championship ==
Top 3 teams qualify for 1999 FIFA U-17 World Championship:

- Brazil
- Paraguay
- Uruguay

== Top goalscorers ==
Team	Players	Goals
(Brazil)	Souza	5
(Ecuador)	Alberto Cuero	4
(Paraguay)	Tomás Guzmán	4
(Uruguay)	Mario Leguizamón	4
(Brazil)	Léo Lima	4

== Ideal Team of the Tournament ==
Team	Players	Position
(Argentina)	Germán Lux	GK
(Paraguay)	David Villalba	DF
(Brazil)	Ricardo	DF
(Uruguay)	Alvaro Meneses	DF
(Brazil)	Anderson	DF
(Uruguay)	Rubén Olivera	MD
(Brazil)	Walker	MD
(Paraguay)	Tomás Guzmán	MD
(Brazil)	Souza	MD
(Brazil)	Léo Lima	FW
(Uruguay)	Walter Peralta	FW
