= Paco Casal =

Uruguayan entrepreneur

- Born: Francisco Casal; São Paulo, SP, Brazil
- Occupation: Businessman

Paco Casal (born Francisco Casal) is a Uruguayan entrepreneur.

Emerging as a football agent, Casal quickly acquired total relevance in the market of his country. He owns the company Tenfield, and the television channel GolTV.

== History ==
Born in São Paulo, at seven months old, Casal moved to Montevideo with his family. He was ball boy of the Estadio Centenario and according to his own rating, a "mediocre" footballer, who in 1968 joined the training divisions of the Defensor Sporting. At the age of 19, he was transferred to Atlético Madrid and later transferred to Racing de Santander.

== Representative of footballers ==
In 1980, while still a player of Vasco, Casal was wounded, and at the same time he received the opportunity that would change his life: his friend (footballer) Juan Ramon Carrasco asks to be represented by him in a negotiation. He would then start a successful career as a representing players. At the end of the 1980s he was the representative of the best players in the country (among them, Carlos Aguilera, Ruben Sosa, Enzo Francescoli, Hugo De Leon and Nelson Gutierrez). In the 1990s, Casal had almost a monopoly of representation of Uruguayan players, since "everybody wanted to be represented by Paco".

== The owner of the Uruguayan football ==
Casal is considered the greatest businessman of Uruguay. A former football player, he built his power as an agent of some players of the Uruguay national football team and started expanding his business. In the 1990s, his power was such that he became virtually the owner of football in Uruguay, having the bond with the main players in the country and being the owner of Tenfield, the company that opened with Enzo Francescoli and Nelson Gutiérrez (two of his former athletes) and which has the broadcasting rights of the Uruguayan Championship.

== Television entrepreneur ==
In the middle of the 2000s, Casal announced that he would gradually leave the representation of players to focus fully on his television projects: Tenfield, and especially to GolTV, a channel based in Miami to be broadcast to all Latin America. The world of the representation of footballers in Uruguay was now open for new entrepreneurs.

Nowadays, the power of Casal attempts to cross borders as he tried entering the world of Argentine football, where he struck against the figure of Julio Grondona. However, in 2011, he managed to get the rights of the international tournament organized by Conmebol, where Grondona has much interference.

Casal is also trying to spread his business to other countries such as Peru, where he tries to close a deal for the television rights of at least 6 of the more representative clubs of Peru, such as Universitario de Deportes, Alianza Lima, Sporting Cristal, Sport Boys, FBC Melgar, among others.
