= Energio Díaz =

Ecuadorian footballer (born 1969)

Personal information
- Full name: Energio José Díaz Quiñónez
- Date of birth: September 15, 1969 (age 57)
- Place of birth: Ecuador
- Position: Striker

Senior career*
Years	Team	Apps	(Gls)
1988–1989	América Quito		
1990–1991	Santa Rosa FC		
1992	Aguas Verdes		
1993	Valdez Milagro		
1994	Delfín		
1995–1996	Deportivo Cuenca		
1996	Chunnam Dragons	9	(1)
1997–2000	LDU Quito		
2001	Deportivo Cuenca		

International career^{‡}
1995	Ecuador	5	(3)
- * Club domestic league appearances and goals as of 11 August 2007 ‡ National team caps and goals as of 4 July 2007

Energio José Díaz Quiñónez (born September 15, 1969) is a retired footballer from Ecuador, who played as a striker during his career.

== International career ==
He obtained five caps for the Ecuador national football team in 1995, scoring three goals, including one at the 1995 Copa América.

== Career statistics ==
=== International ===
Appearances and goals by national team and year
National team	Year	Apps	Goals
Ecuador	1995	5	3
Total		5	3

Scores and results list Ecuador's goal tally first, score column indicates score after each Díaz goal.

List of international goals scored by Energio Díaz
No.	Date	Venue	Opponent	Score	Result	Competition	Ref.
1	10 June 1995	Dongdaemun Stadium, Seoul, South Korea	Costa Rica	2–0	2–1	Friendly	
2	12 June 1995	Dongdaemun Stadium, Seoul, South Korea	Zambia	1–0	1–0	Friendly	
3	13 July 1995	Estadio Atilio Paiva Olivera, Rivera, Uruguay	Peru	1–0	2–1	1995 Copa América	

== Honour ==
=== Nation ===
- Ecuador
  - Korea Cup: 1995

=== Individual ===
- Korea Cup Most Valuable Player: 1995
