= Alexander Madrigal =

Costa Rican-Mexican footballer (born 1972)

Personal information
- Full name: Alexander Mauricio Madrigal Ureña
- Date of birth: 6 May 1972 (age 54)
- Place of birth: Santa María de Dota, Costa Rica
- Height: 1.76 m (5 ft 9 in)
- Position: Defender

Senior career*
| Years | Team | Apps | (Gls) |
| 1992–1996 | Cartaginés | | |
| 1996–1998 | Alajuelense | | |
| 1998–1999 | Unión de Curtidores | | |
| 1999–2000 | León | 15 | (2) |
| 2000–2002 | La Piedad | 80 | (7) |
| 2002–2003 | Veracruz | 18 | (0) |
| 2003 | Dorados | | |
| 2003–2004 | Puntarenas | 26 | (2) |
| 2005–2008 | Pérez Zeledón | 57 | (6) |
| 2008 | Cobán Imperial | | |

International career
| 1995–2002 | Costa Rica | 34 | (2) |
- * Club domestic league appearances and goals

Alexander Mauricio Madrigal Ureña (born 6 May 1972) is a former Costa Rican-Mexican footballer.

== Club career ==
Madrigal grew up in Santa María de Dota and started his career at Cartaginés, with whom he lost the 1992–93 league title decider against Herediano and the 1995–96 final against Alajuelense, and later joined Alajuelense before entering a 5-year spell in Mexico, where he played for 5 different clubs.

Madrigal also played for Municipal Pérez Zeledón. El Machón finished his career at Guatemalan side Cobán Imperial.

== International career ==
Madrigal made his debut for Costa Rica in a May 1995 friendly match against the USA and earned a total of 34 caps, scoring 2 goals. He represented his country in 12 FIFA World Cup qualification matches and played at the 1995 UNCAF Nations Cup and was selected for the Costa Rica national football team for the 1998 CONCACAF Gold Cup.

His final international was an April 2002 friendly match against South Korea.

=== International goals ===
Scores and results list Costa Rica's goal tally first.

| N. | Date | Venue | Opponent | Score | Result | Competition |
|---|---|---|---|---|---|---|
| 1. | 10 June 1995 | Dongdaemun Stadium, Seoul, South Korea | Ecuador | 1–2 | 1–2 | 1995 Korea Cup |
| 2. | 16 July 2000 | Waterford National Stadium, Bridgetown, Barbados | Barbados | 1–0 | 1–2 | 2002 FIFA World Cup qualification |
