= Hartwell Farm =

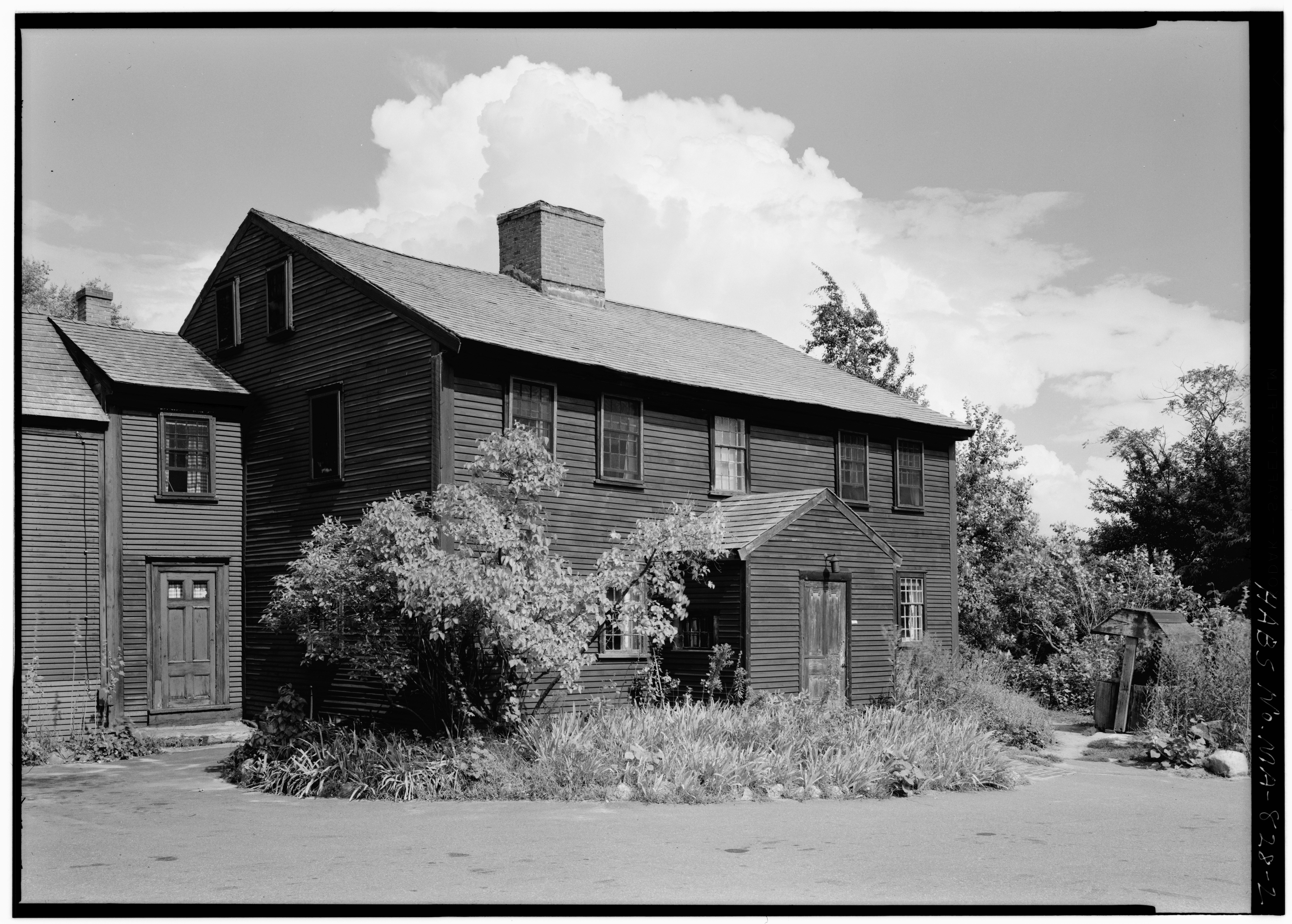
- The restaurant in the 1960s
- Interactive map of Hartwell Farm

Restaurant information
- Established: 1925 (101 years ago)
- Closed: February 1968 (58 years ago)
- Previous owners: Marion A. Fitch; Jane Hamilton Poor
- Location: Virginia Road, Lincoln, Middlesex County, Massachusetts, United States
- Coordinates: 42.4527°N 71.2910°W

Hartwell Farm was a restaurant in Lincoln, Massachusetts, United States. Established in 1925 by Marion Abbie Fitch, a Boston schoolteacher, and Jane Hamilton Poor, an architect, it occupied the 1733-built Samuel Hartwell House, on Virginia Road in today's Minute Man National Historical Park. The building was destroyed by fire in February 1968, and all that remains is its central chimney stack.

The restaurant's name preserved that of the property owned by Samuel Hartwell (1742–1829).

Recipes from the restaurant have been published in several books, including Adventures in Good Eating (1940s and 1950s), Mrs. Appleyard's Kitchen (1974), The Great American Cookbook (2011) and Adventures in Good Cooking (2014). It was described as serving "country fare."

The dining table of the restaurant, which served the same 25 luncheon and dinner options each day, was placed in a "moon" arrangement so as not to have the guests sitting uncomfortably close to the fireplace.

Poor died of edema in October 1961. Thirteen years later, Fitch published Hartwell Farm – A Way of Life, a book which documented the running of the property, including the introduction of running water.

== Dining table ==
The dining room's "moon" table

== Building remains ==
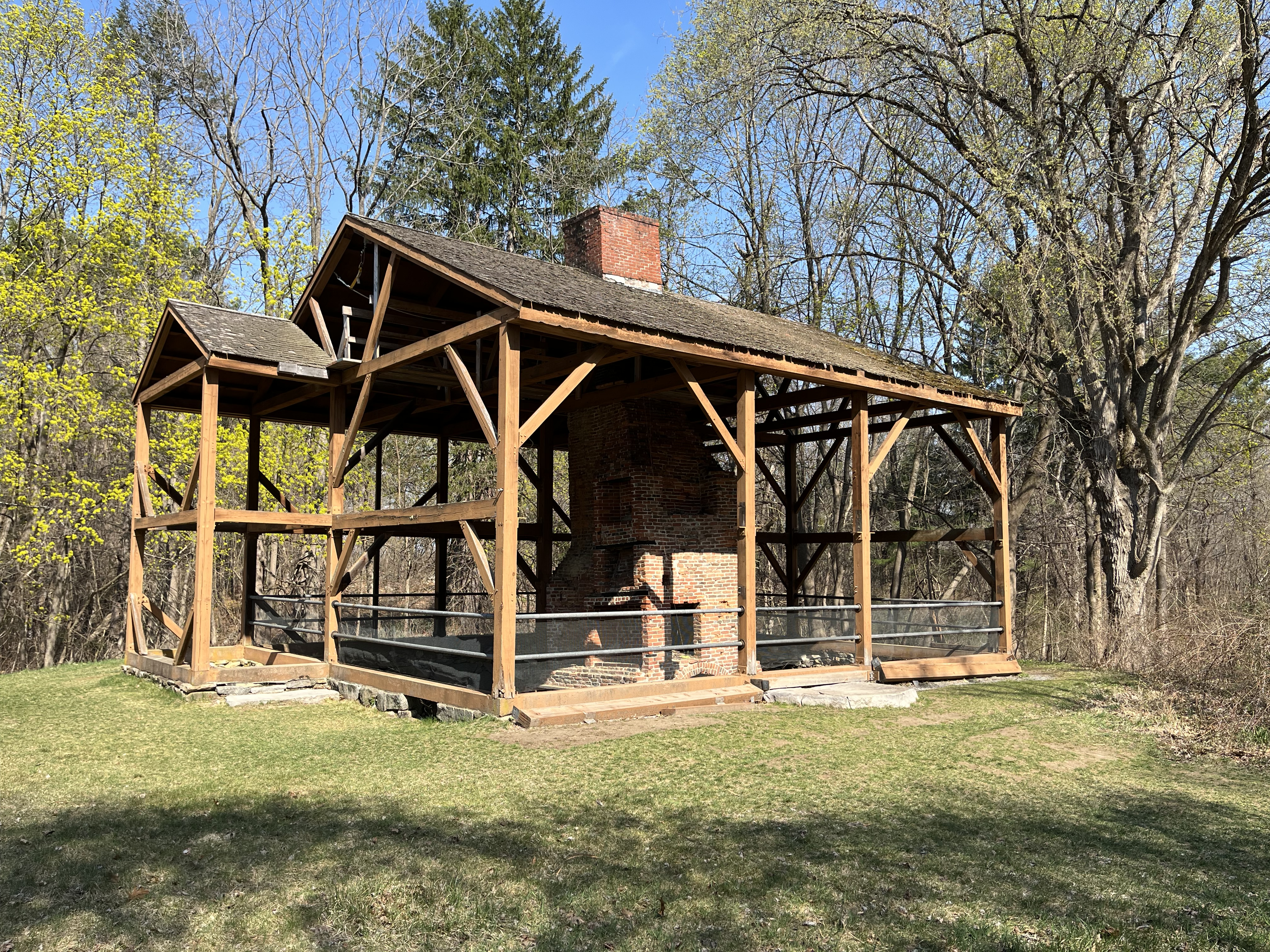
The remnants of the building

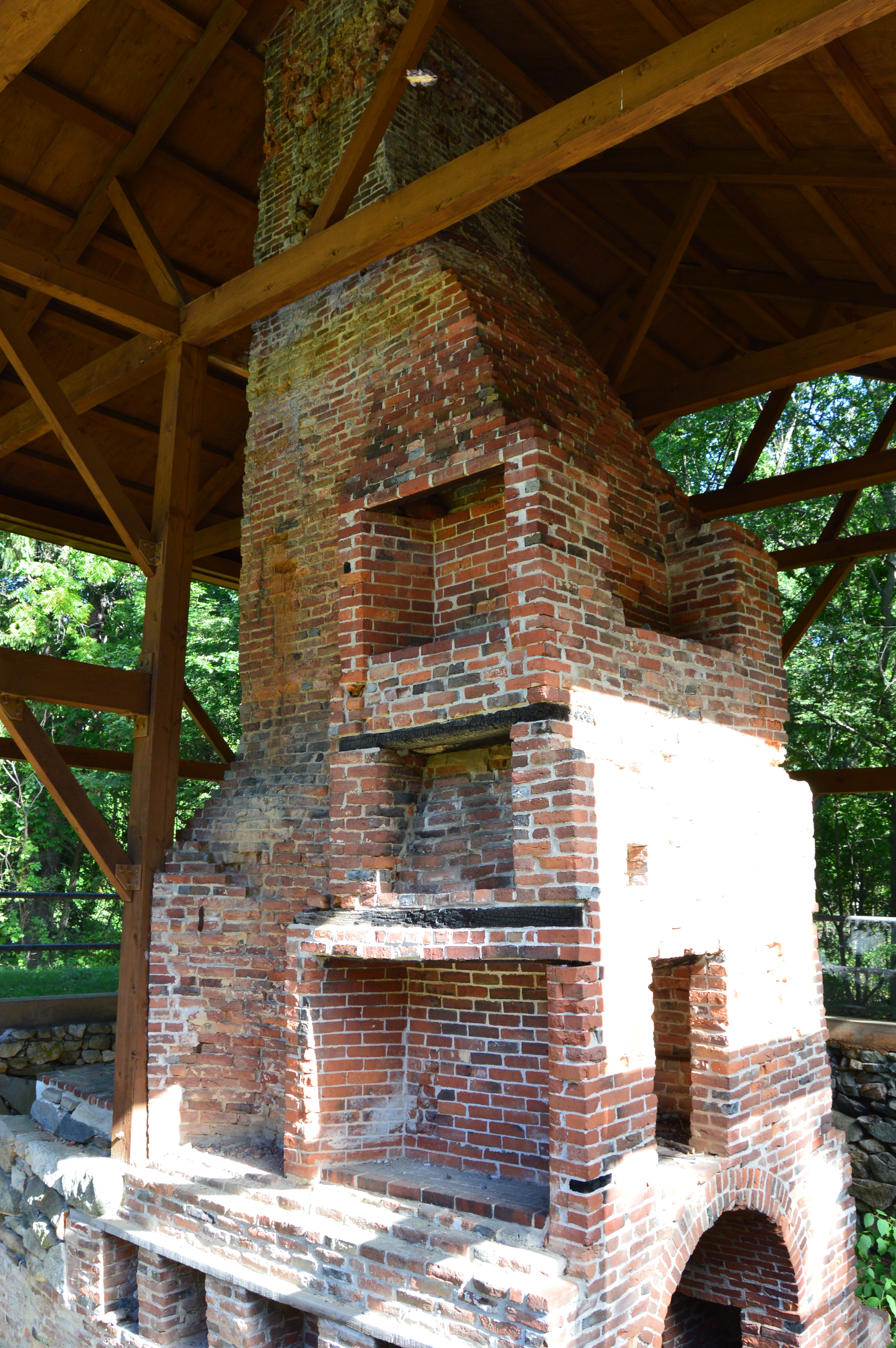
Chimney and hearth
