= Luis Quiñónez (footballer) =

Colombian footballer (born 1968)

Luis Manuel Quiñónez Castillo (born 5 October 1968) is a retired Colombian football midfielder.

He was born in Tumaco. Playing for Millonarios from 1988 through 1991, he then played for Once Caldas from 1992 to mid-1996 and Deportes Tolima through 1999. He stayed the first half of 2000 in Deportivo Pasto, then in Atlético Bucaramanga through 2002. In the 2004–05 season he resurfaced in Venezuelan Monagas SC.

He was capped 17 times and scored 3 goals for Colombia national football team in 1995, including at the 1995 Copa América.
