= Estadio Parque Artigas =

Multi-use stadium in Paysandú, Uruguay

Parque Artigas
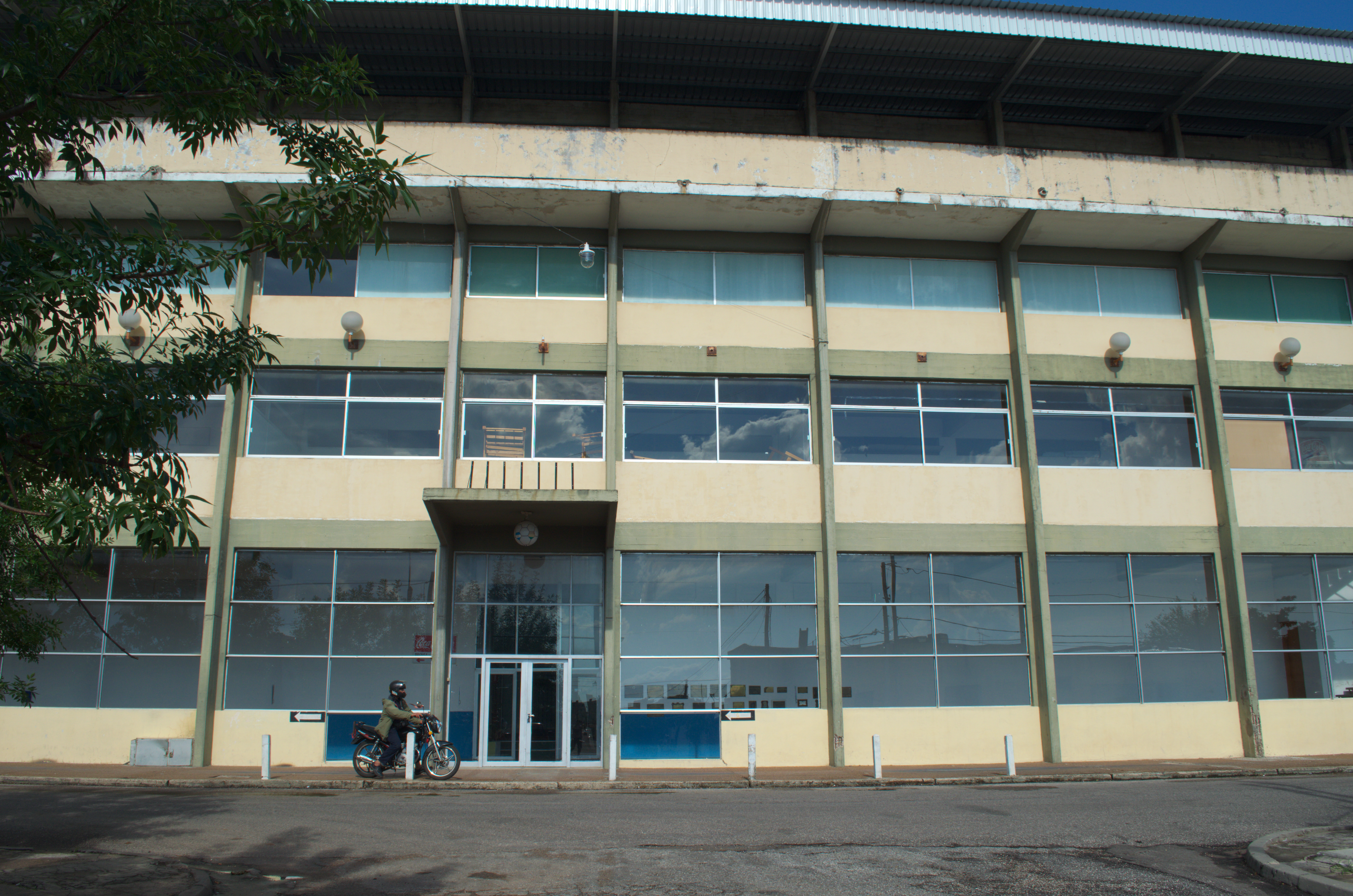
- Interactive map of Parque Artigas
- Coordinates: 32.322694°S 58.072384°W
- Owner: Paysandú Department
- Capacity: 25,000
- Surface: grass

Construction
- Opened: 1995

Tenants
- Paysandú F.C. Club Paysandú Bella Vista

Estadio Parque Artigas is a multi-use stadium in Paysandú, Uruguay. It is currently used mostly for football matches of Paysandú F.C. The stadium holds 25,000 and was built in 1995. It hosted matches during the 1995 Copa America.
