= José Mora (footballer, born 1975) =

Ecuadorian footballer

Personal information
- Date of birth: 8 August 1975 (age 51)
- Position: Striker

Senior career*
Years	Team	Apps	(Gls)
1995–2005	Barcelona de Guayaquil		

International career
1995	Ecuador	7	(1)
- * Club domestic league appearances and goals

José Mora (born 8 August 1975) is an Ecuadorian international footballer who played as a striker.

== Career ==
He played club football for Barcelona de Guayaquil.

He made his international debut for Ecuador in 1995.
