= Luis Quiñonez (politician) =

Guatemalan-born American politician

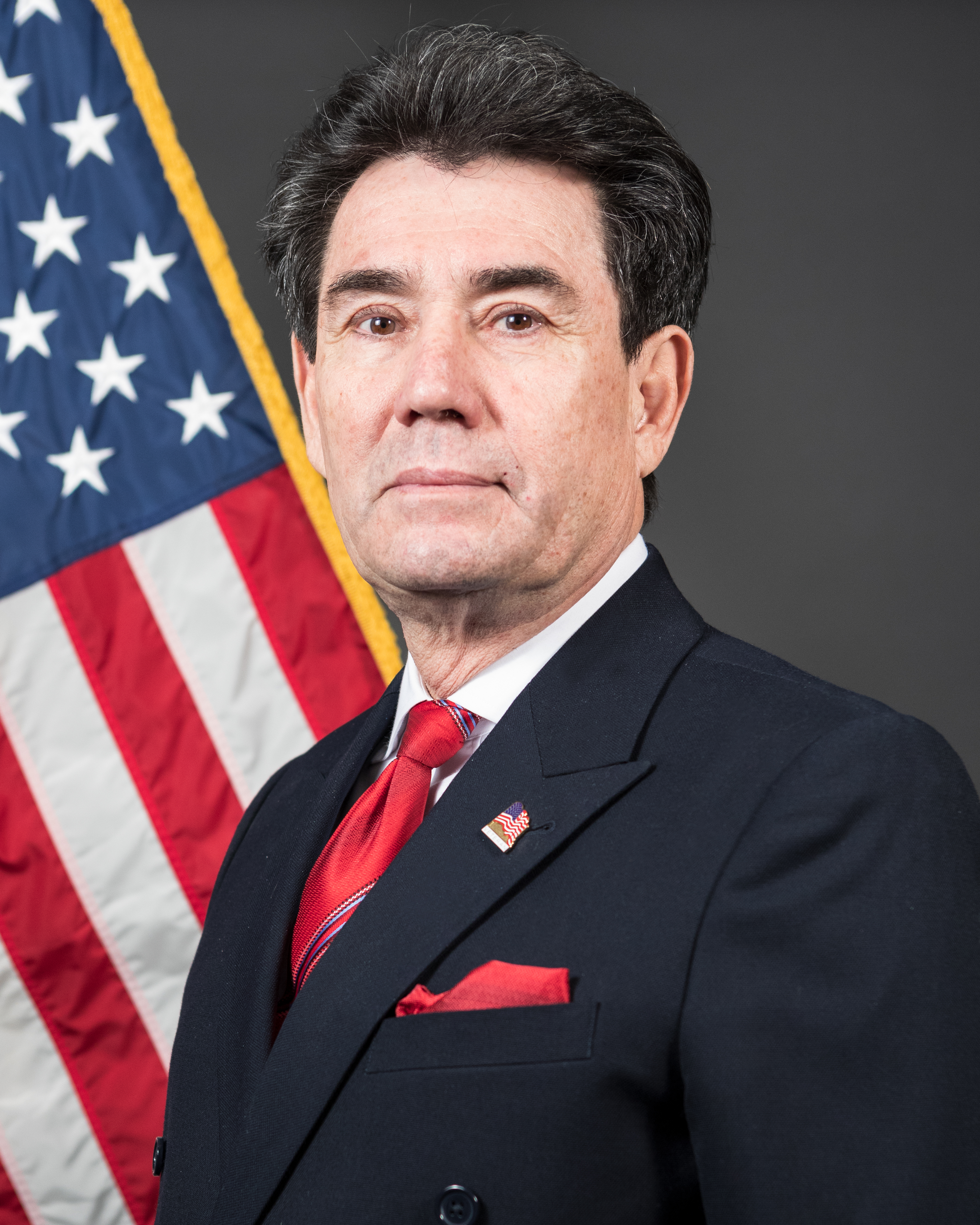
- Luis Rodolfo Quinonez, American Battle Monuments Commissioner official photo
- Born: Guatemala
- Occupation: Businessman
- Political party: Republican
- Board member of: Commissioner of the American Battle Monuments Commission (2017–2021).

Luis Rodolfo Quiñonez is a Guatemalan-born American patriot Vietnam War veteran and business executive. He serves as the chief executive officer of IQ Management Services, a mental health defense contractor. In December 2016, he was interviewed by president-elect Donald Trump for the position of United States Secretary of Veterans Affairs.

In December 2017, President Donald Trump appointed Quiñonez as a commissioner of the American Battle Monuments Commission, where he served until 2021.
