= Estadio Atilio Paiva Olivera =

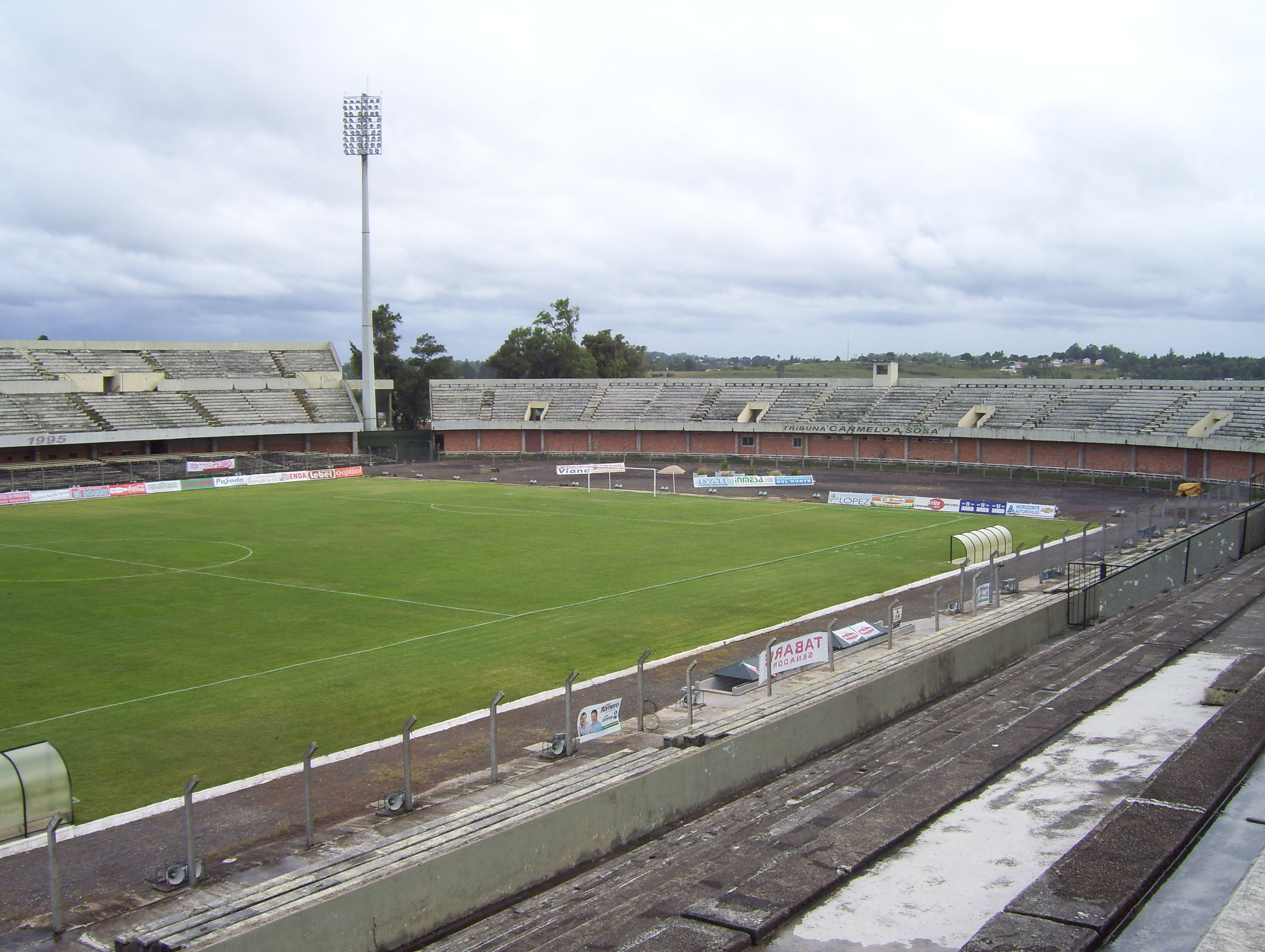
- Interactive map of Estadio Atilio Paiva Olivera
- Location: Rivera, Uruguay
- Coordinates: 30°54′30″S 55°32′54″W
- Capacity: 27,135
- Surface: grass
- Field size: 100 × 60 m

Construction
- Opened: 1927
- Expanded: 1995

Tenants
- Uruguay national football team (some matches); Frontera Rivera Chico

Estadio Atilio Paiva Olivera is a multi-use stadium in Rivera, Uruguay. It is currently used mostly for football matches.

The stadium holds 27,135 people. It was used for the 1995 Copa América and the 1999 South American Under-17 Football Championship.

On 23 June 2011, Uruguay played a friendly match in this stadium against Estonia where the locals won 3–0.
