= Peru national football team results (2020–present) =

This article provides details of international football games played by the Peru national football team from 2020 to present.

== Results ==
Key
Win
Draw
Defeat

=== 2020 ===
8 October 2022 World Cup qualification	Paraguay	2–2	Peru	Asunción, Paraguay
19:30 UTC−3	Á. Romero 67', 81'	Report	Carrillo 52', 85'	Stadium: Estadio Defensores del Chaco; Attendance: 0 Referee: Néstor Pitana (Argentina)

13 October 2022 World Cup qualification	Peru	2–4	Brazil	Lima, Peru
19:00 UTC−5	Carrillo 5'; Tapia 59'	Report	Neymar 28' (pen.), 83' (pen.), 90+4'; Richarlison 64'	Stadium: Estadio Nacional; Attendance: 0 Referee: Julio Bascuñán (Chile)

13 November 2022 World Cup qualification	Chile	2–0	Peru	Santiago, Chile
20:00 UTC−3	Vidal 19', 34'	Report		Stadium: Estadio Nacional; Attendance: 0 Referee: Esteban Ostojich (Uruguay)

17 November 2022 World Cup qualification	Peru	0–2	Argentina	Lima, Peru
19:30 UTC−5		Report	González 17'; La. Martínez 28'	Stadium: Estadio Nacional; Attendance: 0 Referee: Wilmar Roldán (Colombia)

=== 2021 ===
3 June 2022 World Cup qualification	Peru	0–3	Colombia	Lima, Peru
21:00 UTC−5		Report	Mina 40'; Uribe 49'; Díaz 55'	Stadium: Estadio Nacional; Referee: Wilton Sampaio (Brazil)

8 June 2022 World Cup qualification	Ecuador	1–2	Peru	Quito, Ecuador
16:00 UTC−5	Plata 90+2'	Report	Cueva 62'; Advíncula 88'	Stadium: Estadio Rodrigo Paz Delgado; Referee: Esteban Ostojich (Uruguay)

17 June 2021 Copa América GS	Brazil	4–0	Peru	Rio de Janeiro, Brazil
21:00 UTC−3	Alex Sandro 12'; Neymar 68'; Ribeiro 89'; Richarlison 90+3'	Report		Stadium: Estádio Olímpico Nilton Santos; Attendance: 0 Referee: Patricio Loustau (Argentina)

20 June 2021 Copa América GS	Colombia	1–2	Peru	Goiânia, Brazil
21:00 UTC−3	Borja 53' (pen.)	Report	Peña 17'; Mina 64' (o.g.)	Stadium: Estádio Olímpico Pedro Ludovico; Attendance: 0 Referee: Esteban Ostojich (Uruguay)

23 June 2021 Copa América GS	Ecuador	2–2	Peru	Goiânia, Brazil
18:00 UTC−3	Tapia 23' (o.g.); Ay. Preciado 45+3'	Report	Lapadula 49'; Carrillo 54'	Stadium: Estádio Olímpico Pedro Ludovico; Attendance: 0 Referee: Jesús Gil Manzano (Spain)

27 June 2021 Copa América GS	Venezuela	0–1	Peru	Brasília, Brazil
18:00 UTC−3		Report	Carrillo 48'	Stadium: Estádio Nacional Mané Garrincha; Attendance: 0 Referee: Patricio Loustau (Argentina)

2 July 2021 Copa América QF	Peru	3–3 (4–3 p)	Paraguay	Goiânia, Brazil
18:00 UTC−3	Gómez 21' (o.g.); Lapadula 40'; Yotún 80'	Report	Gómez 11'; Alonso 54'; Ávalos 90'	Stadium: Estádio Olímpico Pedro Ludovico; Attendance: 0 Referee: Esteban Ostojich (Uruguay)
	Penalties
	Lapadula (penalty scored); Yotún (penalty scored); Ormeño (penalty missed); Tapia (penalty scored); Cueva (penalty missed); Trauco (penalty scored)		(penalty scored) Á. Romero; (penalty scored) Alonso; (penalty missed) Martínez; (penalty missed) Samudio; (penalty scored) Piris Da Motta; (penalty missed) Espínola

5 July 2021 Copa América SF	Brazil	1–0	Peru	Rio de Janeiro, Brazil
20:00 UTC−3	Paquetá 35'	Report		Stadium: Estádio Olímpico Nilton Santos; Attendance: 0 Referee: Roberto Tobar (Chile)

9 July 2021 Copa América 3rd place	Colombia	3–2	Peru	Brasília, Brazil
21:00 UTC−3	Cuadrado 49'; Díaz 66', 90+4'	Report	Yotún 45'; Lapadula 82'	Stadium: Estádio Nacional Mané Garrincha; Attendance: 0 Referee: Raphael Claus (Brazil)

2 September 2022 World Cup qualification	Peru	1–1	Uruguay	Lima, Peru
20:00 UTC−5	Tapia 25'	Report	De Arrascaeta 29'	Stadium: Estadio Nacional; Attendance: 8,000; Referee: Néstor Pitana (Argentina)

5 September 2022 World Cup qualification	Peru	1–0	Venezuela	Lima, Peru
20:00 UTC−5	Cueva 35'	Report		Stadium: Estadio Nacional; Attendance: 8,000; Referee: Luis Quiroz (Ecuador)

9 September 2022 World Cup qualification	Brazil	2–0	Peru	São Lourenço da Mata, Brazil
21:30 UTC−3	Ribeiro 15'; Neymar 40'	Report		Stadium: Arena Pernambuco; Attendance: 51,000; Referee: Wilmar Roldán (Colombia)

7 October 2022 World Cup qualification	Peru	2–0	Chile	Lima, Peru
20:00 UTC−5	Cueva 36'; Peña 64'	Report		Stadium: Estadio Nacional; Attendance: 8,000; Referee: Christian Ferreyra (Uruguay)

10 October 2022 World Cup qualification	Bolivia	1–0	Peru	La Paz, Bolivia
16:00 UTC−4	R. Vaca 83'	Report		Stadium: Estadio Hernando Siles; Attendance: 20,000; Referee: Guillermo Guerrero (Ecuador)

14 October 2022 World Cup qualification	Argentina	1–0	Peru	Buenos Aires, Argentina
20:30 UTC−3	La. Martínez 43'	Report		Stadium: Estadio Monumental Antonio Vespucio Liberti; Attendance: 36,000; Referee: Wilton Sampaio (Brazil)

11 November 2022 World Cup qualification	Peru	3–0	Bolivia	Lima, Peru
21:00 UTC−5	Lapadula 9'; Cueva 31'; Peña 39'	Report		Stadium: Estadio Nacional; Attendance: 10,000; Referee: Éber Aquino (Paraguay)

16 November 2022 World Cup qualification	Venezuela	1–2	Peru	Caracas, Venezuela
17:00 UTC−4	Machís 52'	Report	Lapadula 18'; Cueva 65'	Stadium: Estadio Olímpico de la UCV; Attendance: 9,000; Referee: Bruno Arleu (Brazil)

=== 2022 ===
16 January Friendly	Peru	1–1	Panama	Lima, Peru
16:00 UTC−5	Valera 38'	Report	Ayarza 72'	Stadium: Estadio Nacional; Referee: Fernando Echenique (Argentina)

20 January Friendly	Peru	3–0	Jamaica	Lima, Peru
20:00 UTC−5	Iberico 48'; Valera 66'; Yotún 82'	Report		Stadium: Estadio Nacional; Referee: Fernando Echenique (Argentina)

28 January 2022 World Cup qualification	Colombia	0–1	Peru	Barranquilla, Colombia
16:00 UTC−5		Report	Flores 85'	Stadium: Estadio Metropolitano; Attendance: 41,000; Referee: Jesús Valenzuela (Venezuela)

1 February 2022 World Cup qualification	Peru	1–1	Ecuador	Lima, Peru
21:00 UTC−5	Flores 69'	Report	Estrada 2'	Stadium: Estadio Nacional; Attendance: 28,000; Referee: Wilton Sampaio (Brazil)

24 March 2022 World Cup qualification	Uruguay	1–0	Peru	Montevideo, Uruguay
20:30 UTC−3	De Arrascaeta 42'	Report		Stadium: Estadio Centenario; Attendance: 40,000; Referee: Anderson Daronco (Brazil)

29 March 2022 World Cup qualification	Peru	2–0	Paraguay	Lima, Peru
18:30 UTC−5	Lapadula 5'; Yotún 42'	Report		Stadium: Estadio Nacional; Attendance: 40,000; Referee: Fernando Rapallini (Argentina)

5 June Friendly	Peru	1–0	New Zealand	Barcelona, Spain
17:30 UTC+2	Lapadula 69'	Report		Stadium: RCDE Stadium; Attendance: 32,149; Referee: Ishmael Barbara (Malta)

13 June 2022 World Cup inter-confederation play-offs	Australia	0–0 (a.e.t.) (5–4 p)	Peru	Al Rayyan, Qatar
21:00 UTC+3		Report		Stadium: Ahmad bin Ali Stadium; Attendance: 43,510; Referee: Slavko Vinčić (Slovenia)
	Penalties
	Boyle (penalty missed); Mooy (penalty scored); Goodwin (penalty scored); Hrustic (penalty scored); Maclaren (penalty scored); Mabil (penalty scored)		(penalty scored) Lapadula; (penalty scored) Callens; (penalty missed) Advíncula; (penalty scored) Tapia; (penalty scored) Flores; (penalty missed) Valera

24 September Friendly	Mexico	1–0	Peru	Pasadena, United States
18:00 UTC−7	Lozano 85'	Report		Stadium: Rose Bowl; Attendance: 62,729; Referee: Bryan López (Guatemala)

27 September Friendly	Peru	4–1	El Salvador	Washington, D.C., United States
20:00 UTC−4	Zavaleta 19' (o.g.); Lapadula 40' (pen.); Reyna 81'; Cueva 86' (pen.)	Report	Larín 34' (pen.)	Stadium: Audi Field; Attendance: 18,000; Referee: Benjamín Pineda (Costa Rica)

16 November Friendly	Peru	1–0	Paraguay	Lima, Peru
19:00 UTC−5	Valera 49'	Report		Stadium: Estadio Nacional; Attendance: 18,000; Referee: John Alexander Ospina (Colombia)

19 November Friendly	Peru	1–0	Bolivia	Arequipa, Peru
19:30 UTC−5	Iberico 55'	Report		Stadium: Estadio de la UNSA; Attendance: 25,500; Referee: Flavio Rodrigues de Souza (Brazil)

=== 2023 ===
25 March Friendly	Germany	2–0	Peru	Mainz, Germany
20:45 UTC+1	Füllkrug 12', 33'	Report		Stadium: Mewa Arena; Attendance: 25,358; Referee: Maria Sole Ferrieri Caputi (Italy)

28 March Friendly	Morocco	0–0	Peru	Madrid, Spain
20:30 UTC+2		Report		Stadium: Metropolitano Stadium; Attendance: 32,000; Referee: Juan Martínez Munuera (Spain)

16 June Friendly	South Korea	0–1	Peru	Busan, South Korea
20:00 UTC+9		Report	Reyna 11'	Stadium: Busan Asiad Main Stadium; Attendance: 52,443; Referee: Shaun Evans (Australia)

20 June 2023 Kirin Challenge Cup	Japan	4–1	Peru	Suita, Japan
18:55 UTC+9	H. Ito 22'; Mitoma 37'; J. Itō 63'; Maeda 75'	Report	Gonzáles 83'	Stadium: Panasonic Stadium Suita; Attendance: 35,001; Referee: Khamis Al-Marri (Qatar)

7 September 2026 World Cup qualification	Paraguay	0–0	Peru	Ciudad del Este, Paraguay
18:30 UTC−3		Report		Stadium: Estadio Antonio Aranda; Attendance: 16,211; Referee: Andrés Matonte (Uruguay)

12 September 2026 World Cup qualification	Peru	0–1	Brazil	Lima, Peru
21:00 UTC−5		Report	Marquinhos 90'	Stadium: Estadio Nacional; Attendance: 56,328; Referee: Fernando Rapallini (Argentina)

12 October 2026 World Cup qualification	Chile	2–0	Peru	Santiago, Chile
21:00 UTC−3	Valdés 74'; López 90+1' (o.g.)	Report		Stadium: Estadio Monumental David Arellano; Attendance: 36,847; Referee: Wilmar Roldán (Colombia)

17 October 2026 World Cup qualification	Peru	0–2	Argentina	Lima, Peru
21:00 UTC−5		Report	Messi 32', 42'	Stadium: Estadio Nacional; Attendance: 37,675; Referee: Jesús Valenzuela (Venezuela)

16 November 2026 World Cup qualification	Bolivia	2–0	Peru	La Paz, Bolivia
16:00 UTC−4	H. Vaca 20'; R. Vaca 87'	Report		Stadium: Estadio Hernando Siles; Attendance: 28,000; Referee: Guillermo Guerrero (Ecuador)

21 November 2026 World Cup qualification	Peru	1–1	Venezuela	Lima, Peru
21:00 UTC−5	Yotún 17'	Report	Savarino 54'	Stadium: Estadio Nacional; Attendance: 27,323; Referee: Darío Herrera (Argentina)

=== 2024 ===
22 March Friendly	Peru	2–0	Nicaragua	Lima, Peru
20:30 UTC−5	Grimaldo 2'; Lapadula 12'	Report		Stadium: Estadio Alejandro Villanueva; Attendance: 33,900; Referee: Paulo Cesar da Silva (Brazil)

26 March Friendly	Peru	4–1	Dominican Republic	Lima, Peru
20:30 UTC−5	Peña 18'; Castillo 45+1'; Quispe 54'; Paolo Guerrero 90+4' (pen.)	Report	López 58'	Stadium: Estadio Monumental; Attendance: 50,000; Referee: Braulio Da Silva Machado (Brazil)

7 June Friendly	Peru	0–0	Paraguay	Lima, Peru
19:30 UTC−5		Report		Stadium: Estadio Monumental; Attendance: 60,000; Referee: Guillermo Guerrero (Ecuador)

14 June Friendly	El Salvador	0–1	Peru	Chester, United States
20:30 UTC−4		Report	Flores 17'	Stadium: Subaru Park; Attendance: 12,000; Referee: Kwinsi Williams (Trinidad and Tobago

21 June 2024 Copa América GS	Peru	0–0	Chile	Arlington, United States
19:00 UTC−5		Report		Stadium: AT&T Stadium; Attendance: 43,030; Referee: Wilton Sampaio (Brazil)

25 June 2024 Copa América GS	Peru	0–1	Canada	Kansas City, United States
17:00 UTC−5		Report	David 74'	Stadium: Children's Mercy Park; Attendance: 15,625; Referee: Mario Escobar (Guatemala)

29 June 2024 Copa América GS	Argentina	2–0	Peru	Miami Gardens, United States
20:00 UTC−4	La. Martinez 47', 86'	Report		Stadium: Hard Rock Stadium; Attendance: 64,972; Referee: César Arturo Ramos (Mexico)

6 September 2026 World Cup qualification	Peru	1–1	Colombia	Lima, Peru
20:30 UTC−5	Callens 68'	Report	Díaz 82'	Stadium: Estadio Nacional; Attendance: 40,000; Referee: Esteban Ostojich (Uruguay)

10 September 2026 World Cup qualification	Ecuador	1–0	Peru	Quito, Ecuador
16:00 UTC−5	Valencia 54'	Report		Stadium: Estadio Rodrigo Paz Delgado; Attendance: 35,000; Referee: Andrés Rojas (Colombia)

11 October 2026 World Cup qualification	Peru	1–0	Uruguay	Lima, Peru
20:30 UTC−5	Araujo 88'	Report		Stadium: Estadio Nacional; Attendance: 43,000; Referee: Facundo Tello (Argentina)

15 October 2026 World Cup qualification	Brazil	4–0	Peru	Brasília, Brazil
21:45 UTC−3	Raphinha 38' (pen.), 54' (pen.); Pereira 71'; Luiz Henrique 74'	Report		Stadium: Estádio Nacional Mané Garrincha; Attendance: 60,139; Referee: Esteban Ostojich (Uruguay)

15 November 2026 World Cup qualification	Peru	0–0	Chile	Lima, Peru
20:30 UTC−5		Report		Stadium: Estadio Nacional; Attendance: 47,122; Referee: Wilton Sampaio (Brazil)

19 November 2026 World Cup qualification	Argentina	1–0	Peru	Buenos Aires, Argentina
21:00 UTC−3	La. Martínez 55'	Report		Stadium: La Bombonera; Attendance: 52,000; Referee: Wilmar Roldán (Colombia)

=== 2025 ===
20 March 2026 World Cup qualification	Peru	3–1	Bolivia	Lima, Peru
19:30 UTC−5	Polo 37'; Guerrero 45'; Flores 82'	Report	Terceros 58' (pen.)	Stadium: Estadio Nacional; Attendance: 33,683; Referee: Yael Falcón Pérez (Argentina)

25 March 2026 World Cup qualification	Venezuela	1–0	Peru	Maturín, Venezuela
20:00 UTC−4	Rondón 41' (pen.)	Report		Stadium: Estadio Monumental; Attendance: 33,683; Referee: Cristian Garay (Chile)

6 June 2026 World Cup qualification	Colombia	0–0	Peru	Barranquilla, Colombia
15:30 UTC−5		Report		Stadium: Estadio Metropolitano Roberto Meléndez; Attendance: 43,933; Referee: Wilton Sampaio (Brazil)

10 June 2026 World Cup qualification	Peru	0–0	Ecuador	Lima, Peru
20:30 UTC−5		Report		Stadium: Estadio Nacional; Attendance: 33,749; Referee: Andrés Rojas (Colombia)

4 September 2026 World Cup qualification	Uruguay	3–0	Peru	Montevideo, Uruguay
20:30 UTC−3	Aguirre 14'; De Arrascaeta 58'; Viñas 80'	Report		Stadium: Estadio Centenario; Referee: Facundo Tello (Argentina)

9 September 2026 World Cup qualification	Peru	0–1	Paraguay	Lima, Peru
18:30 UTC−5		Report	Galarza 78'	Stadium: Estadio Nacional; Referee: Maximiliano Ramírez (Argentina)

10 October Friendly	Chile	2–1	Peru	Santiago, Chile
20:00 UTC−3	Brereton 63'; Gutiérrez 90+4'	Report	Inga 40'	Stadium: Estadio Bicentenario de La Florida; Attendance: 7,539; Referee: Leandro Rey Hilfer (Argentina)

12 November Friendly	Russia	1–1	Peru	Saint Petersburg, Russia
20:00 UTC+3	Golovin 18'	Report	Valera 82'	Stadium: Krestovsky Stadium; Attendance: 45,536; Referee: Kamal Umudlu (Azerbaijan)

18 November Friendly	Chile	2–1	Peru	Sochi, Russia
20:00 UTC+3	Loyola 53'; Osorio 60'	Report	Valera 34' (pen.)	Stadium: Fisht Olympic Stadium; Attendance: 4,000; Referee: Kirill Levnikov (Russia)

21 December Unofficial friendly	Peru	2–0	Bolivia	Chincha Alta, Peru
15:30 UTC−5	Magallanes 87'; Soyer 89'	Report		Stadium: Estadio Félix Castillo Tardío; Attendance: 2,000; Referee: Bruno Pérez (Peru)

=== 2026 ===
28 March Friendly	Senegal	2–0	Peru	Saint-Denis, France
17:00 UTC+1	Jackson 41'; I. Sarr 54'	Report		Stadium: Stade de France; Attendance: 70,000; Referee: Jérémie Pignard (France)

31 March Friendly	Peru	2–2	Honduras	Leganés, Spain
20:00 UTC+2	Vélez 6', 58'	Report	Palma 44'; Mencía 90+4'	Stadium: Butarque; Attendance: 12,000; Referee: Guillermo Cuadra Fernández (Spain)

5 June Friendly	Haiti	1–2	Peru	Miami, United States
20:00 UTC−4	Isidor 16'	Report	Garcés 81'; Vélez 84'	Stadium: Nu Stadium; Attendance: 26,700; Referee: Filip Dujic (Canada)

8 June Friendly	Peru	1–3	Spain	Puebla, Mexico
20:00 UTC−6	Vélez 66'	Report	Oyarzabal 2'; Pedri 32'; Gallese 53' (o.g.)	Stadium: Estadio Cuauhtémoc; Attendance: 45,845; Referee: Fernando Hernández (Mexico)

26 September Friendly	United States	4–1	Peru	Orlando, United States
16:30 UTC−4	Ellis 4'; Tillman 66' (pen.); Hall 72'; Berhalter 90'	Report	Lapadula 15'	Stadium: Inter.co Stadium; Attendance: 24,228; Referee: Steffon Dewar (Jamaica)

29 September Friendly	Mexico	1–1	Peru	Harrison, United States
21:00 UTC−4	Guzmán 49'	Report	Vélez 26'	Stadium: Sports Illustrated Stadium; Attendance: 25,728; Referee: Jon Freemon (United States)

3 October Friendly	Canada	2–0	Peru	Montreal, Canada
14:00 UTC−4	Shaffelburg 19', 35'	Report		Stadium: Saputo Stadium; Attendance: 19,619; Referee: Jon Freemon (United States)

6 October Friendly	Colombia	2–0	Peru	Miami Gardens, United States
19:45 UTC−4	Velásquez 57'; Arcila 90+2'	Report		Stadium: Hard Rock Stadium; Attendance: 15,000; Referee: Rubiel Vázquez (United States)

13 November Friendly	Peru	2–0	Bolivia	Lima, Peru
20:00 UTC−5	Lapadula 13' (pen.); Castro 87'	Report		Stadium: Estadio Alejandro Villanueva; Attendance: 10,000; Referee: Carlos Betancur (Colombia)

9 December Friendly	Peru	v	Panama	Cusco, Peru
18:00 UTC−5				Stadium: Estadio Garcilaso

=== 2027 ===
March Friendly	Bolivia	v	Peru	Cobija, Bolivia
--:--				Stadium: Estadio Roberto Jordán Cuéllar

== Head to head records (since 2020) ==
As of 14 November 2026, after the match against Bolivia

Head to head records
Opponent	P	W	D	L	GF	GA	W%	D%	L%
Argentina	5	0	0	5	0	8	0	0	100
Australia	1	0	1	0	0	0	0	100	0
Bolivia	7	5	0	2	11	4	71.43	0	28.57
Brazil	6	0	0	6	2	16	0	0	100
Canada	2	2	0	1	2	1	50	0	100
Chile	7	1	2	4	4	8	14.29	28.57	57.14
Colombia	7	2	2	3	6	10	28.57	28.57	42.86
Dominican Republic	1	1	0	0	4	1	100	0	0
Ecuador	5	1	3	1	5	5	20	60	20
El Salvador	2	2	0	0	5	1	100	0	0
Germany	1	0	0	1	0	2	0	0	100
Haiti	1	1	0	0	2	1	100	0	0
Honduras	1	0	1	0	2	2	0	100	0
Jamaica	1	1	0	0	3	0	100	0	0
Japan	1	0	0	1	1	4	0	0	100
Mexico	2	0	1	1	1	2	0	50	50
Morocco	1	0	1	0	0	0	0	100	0
New Zealand	1	1	0	0	1	0	100	0	0
Nicaragua	1	1	0	0	2	0	100	0	0
Panama	1	0	1	0	1	1	0	100	0
Paraguay	7	2	4	1	8	6	28.57	57.14	14.29
Russia	1	0	1	0	1	1	0	100	0
Senegal	1	0	0	1	0	2	0	0	100
Spain	1	0	0	1	1	3	0	0	100
South Korea	1	1	0	0	1	0	100	0	0
United States	2	0	0	1	5	5	0	0	100
Uruguay	4	1	1	2	2	5	25	16.67	33.33
Venezuela	5	3	1	1	5	3	60	20	20
Total	76	25	19	32	75	91	32.89	25	42.11

== Notes ==
1. Paraguay's first-ever World Cup qualifying victory over Peru in Lima.
2. The match was organized and contested by a team from SAFAP, an organization separate from the Peruvian Football Federation.
