= Peru national football team =

Men's association football team

Peru
- Nickname(s): La Bicolor (The Bicolour); La Blanquirroja (The White and Red); La Rojiblanca (The Red and White); Los Incas (The Incas)
- Association: Federación Peruana de Fútbol (FPF)
- Confederation: CONMEBOL (South America)
- Head coach: Mano Menezes
- Captain: Yoshimar Yotún
- Most caps: Yoshimar Yotún (139)
- Top scorer: Paolo Guerrero (40)
- Home stadium: Estadio Nacional
- FIFA code: PER
First colours	Second colours

FIFA ranking
- Current: 52 ▲1 (18 November 2026)
- Highest: 10 (October 2017)
- Lowest: 91 (September 2009)

First international
- Peru 0–4 Uruguay (Lima, Peru; 1 November 1927)

Biggest win
- Peru 9–1 Ecuador (Bogotá, Colombia; 11 August 1938)

Biggest defeat
- Peru 0–7 Brazil (Santa Cruz de la Sierra, Bolivia; 26 June 1997)

World Cup
- Appearances: 5 (first in 1930)
- Best result: Quarter-finals (1970, 1978)

Copa América
- Appearances: 34 (first in 1927)
- Best result: Champions (1939, 1975)

Panamerican Championship
- Appearances: 2 (first in 1952)
- Best result: Fourth place (1952, 1956)

CONCACAF Gold Cup
- Appearances: 1 (first in 2000)
- Best result: Semi-finals (2000)
Medal record
Copa América
Gold medal – first place	1939 Peru	Team
Gold medal – first place	1975 South America	Team
Silver medal – second place	2019 Brazil	Team
Bronze medal – third place	1927 Peru	Team
Bronze medal – third place	1993 Peru	Team
Bronze medal – third place	1949 Brazil	Team
Bronze medal – third place	1955 Chile	Team
Bronze medal – third place	1979 South America	Team
Bronze medal – third place	1983 South America	Team
Bronze medal – third place	2011 Argentina	Team
Bronze medal – third place	2015 Chile	Team
Bolivarian Games
Gold medal – first place	1938 Bogotá	Team
- Website: fpf.pe

The Peru national football team (Spanish: Selección de fútbol del Perú), nicknamed la Bicolor, represents Peru in men's international football. The national team has been organised, since 1927, by the Federación Peruana de Fútbol (English: Peruvian Football Federation). It has been a member of FIFA since 1924 and a member of CONMEBOL since 1925. It was also a member of PFC, the attempt at a unified confederation of the Americas from 1946 to 1961.

Peru has won the Copa América twice, and has qualified for the FIFA World Cup five times (last appearing in 2018); the team also participated in the 1936 Olympic football competition and has reached the semi-finals of the CONCACAF Gold Cup. The team plays most of its home matches at the Estadio Nacional in Lima, the country's capital. The team wears distinctive white shirts adorned with a diagonal red stripe, which combine Peru's national colours. This basic design has been used continuously since 1936, and gives rise to the team's common Spanish nickname, la Blanquirroja ("the white-and-red"). Peruvian football fans are known for their distinctive cheer ¡Arriba Perú! ("Onward Peru!") and large celebrations. Peru has a longstanding rivalry with Chile.

The Peru national team enjoyed its most successful periods thanks to footballing generations from the 1930s and the 1970s. The 1930s generation led Peru at the inaugural FIFA World Cup in 1930 and won the 1938 Bolivarian Games and the 1939 South American Championship, with goalkeeper Juan Valdivieso and forwards Teodoro Fernández and Alejandro Villanueva playing important roles. The 1970s generation qualified Peru for three World Cups and won the Copa América in 1975; the team then notably included defender Héctor Chumpitaz and the forward partnership of Hugo Sotil and Teófilo Cubillas. Teodoro Fernández and Teófilo Cubillas are both often considered Peru's greatest player in history.

The national team's all-time top goalscorer is Paolo Guerrero, with 40 goals, and its most-capped players is Yoshimar Yotún with 139 appearances. Since January 2026, Peru is managed by Mano Menezes.

== History ==
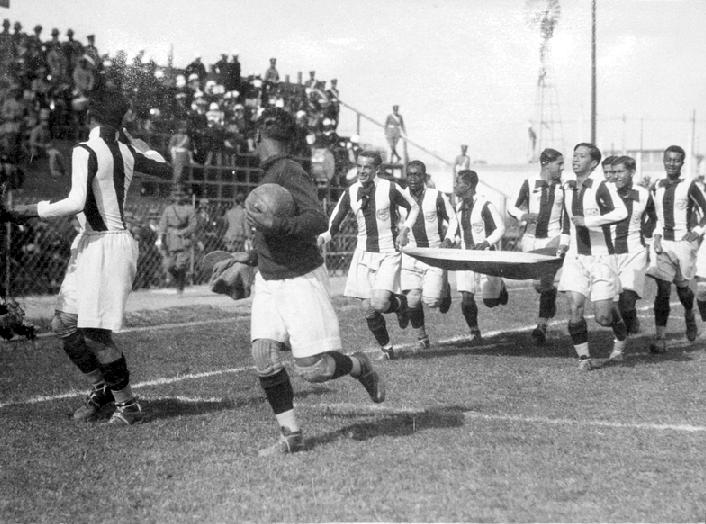
Peru's debut at the 1927 South American Championship in Lima.

During the 19th century, British immigrants and Peruvians returning from England introduced football to Peru. In 1859, members of the British community in the country's capital founded the Lima Cricket Club, Peru's first organisation dedicated to the practice of cricket, rugby, and football. (Note: The Lima Cricket and Football Club might be the oldest club in the Americas that today plays association football.) These new sports became popular among the local upper-class over the following decades, but early developments stopped due to the War of the Pacific that Peru fought against Chile from 1879 to 1883. After the war, Peru's coastal society embraced football as a modern innovation. In Lima's barrios, football became a popular daily activity, encouraged by bosses who wanted it to inspire solidarity and productivity among their workers. In the adjacent port of Callao and other commercial areas, British civilian workers and sailors played the sport among themselves and with locals. (Note: During these games in Callao, the Peruvians possibly invented the bicycle kick, which is known in Peru as the chalaca (meaning "from Callao").) Sports rivalries between locals and foreigners arose in Callao, and between elites and workers in Lima—as foreigners departed, this became a rivalry between Callao and Lima. These factors, coupled with the sport's rapid growth among the urban poor of Lima's La Victoria district (where, in 1901, the Alianza Lima club formed), led to Peru developing the Andean region's strongest footballing culture, and, according to historian Andreas Campomar, "some of the most elegant and accomplished football on the continent".

The Peruvian Football League, founded in 1912, held annual competitions until it disbanded in 1921 amid disputes amongst its clubs. The Peruvian Football Federation (FPF), formed in 1922, reorganised the annual tournament in 1926. The FPF joined the South American Football Confederation (CONMEBOL) in 1925 and, after restructuring its finances, formed the Peru national football team in 1927. The team debuted in the 1927 South American Championship, hosted by the FPF at Lima's Estadio Nacional. Peru lost 0–4 against Uruguay in its first match, and won 3–2 over Bolivia in its second. Peru did not advance beyond the first stage of the inaugural FIFA World Cup in 1930.

The 1930s were the team's first golden era, when they improved their game through play with more experienced teams. The Combinado del Pacífico (a squad composed of Chilean and Peruvian footballers) toured Europe from 1933 to 1934. (Note: The European press also named them the "Peru-Chile XI", the "South American Team", and the "All-Pacific". Most players were from Peru's Universitario de Deportes, with reinforcements from Alianza Lima, Atlético Chalaco, and Chile's Colo-Colo.) Starting with Ciclista Lima in 1926, Peru's football clubs toured Latin America with much success. During one of these tours—Alianza Lima's undefeated journey through Chile in 1935—emerged the Rodillo Negro ("Black Roller"), a skillful group led by forwards Alejandro Villanueva, Teodoro Fernández and goalkeeper Juan Valdivieso. Sports historian Richard Witzig described these three as "a soccer triumvirate unsurpassed in the world at that time", citing their combined innovation and effectiveness at both ends of the field. Peru and the Rodillo Negro impressed at the 1936 Summer Olympics, won the inaugural Bolivarian Games in 1938, and finished the decade as South American champions.

Historian David Goldblatt assessed the decline of its previous success: "despite all the apparent preconditions for footballing growth and success, Peruvian football disappeared". He attributes this sudden decline to Peruvian authorities' repression of "social, sporting and political organisations among the urban and rural poor" during the 1940s and 1950s. Nevertheless, Peru performed creditably at the South American Championships, placing third in Brazil 1949 and Chile 1955, and missed qualification for the Sweden 1958 World Cup finals, over two legs to eventual champions Brazil.

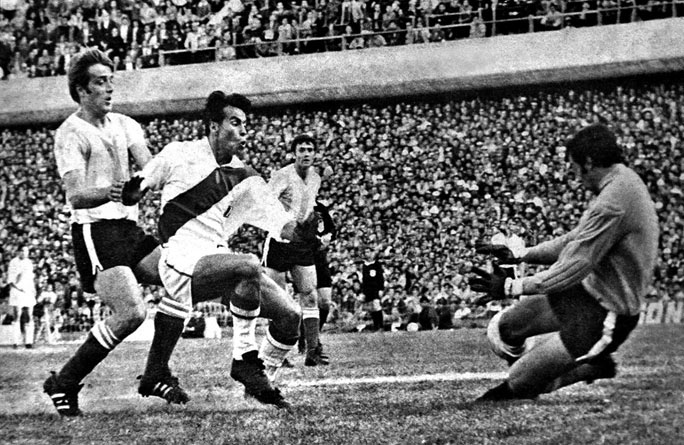
Oswaldo Ramírez scored the goals against Argentina that secured Peru's 1970 World Cup qualification.

Successes during the late 1960s, including qualification for the 1970 FIFA World Cup finals in Mexico, ushered in a second golden period for Peruvian football. The formidable forward partnership between Teófilo Cubillas and Hugo Sotil was a key factor in Peru's triumphs during the 1970s. Peru reached the quarter-finals in 1970, losing to the tournament winners Brazil, and earned the first FIFA Fair Play Trophy; historian Richard Henshaw describes Peru as "the surprise of the 1970 competition, showing flair and a high level of skill". Five years later, Peru became South American champions for the second time when it won the 1975 Copa América (the then-rechristened South American Championship) despite failing to qualify for West Germany 1974 a year earlier. The team next qualified for two consecutive World Cup finals, reaching the second round in Argentina 1978 and the first group stage in Spain 1982. Peru's early elimination in 1982 marked the end of the side's globally-admired "flowing football". Peru, nonetheless, barely missed the Mexico 1986 World Cup finals after placing second in a qualification group to eventual champions Argentina. In their golden period from 1970 to 1982, Peru was among the best teams in the world.

By the late 1980s, renewed expectations for Peru were centred on a young generation of Alianza Lima players known colloquially as Los Potrillos ("The Colts"). Sociologists Aldo Panfichi and Victor Vich write that Los Potrillos "became the hope of the entire country"—fans expected them to qualify for the Italy 1990 World Cup finals. These hopes were dashed when the national team entered a hiatus after its manager and several of its players died in a plane crash carrying most of Alianza's team and staff in 1987. Peru subsequently only came close to reaching the France 1998 World Cup finals, missing qualification on goal difference, but would go on to win the 1999 Kirin Cup tournament in Japan (sharing the title with Belgium) and reached the semi-finals at the 1997 Copa América and the 2000 CONCACAF Gold Cup (contested as an invitee).

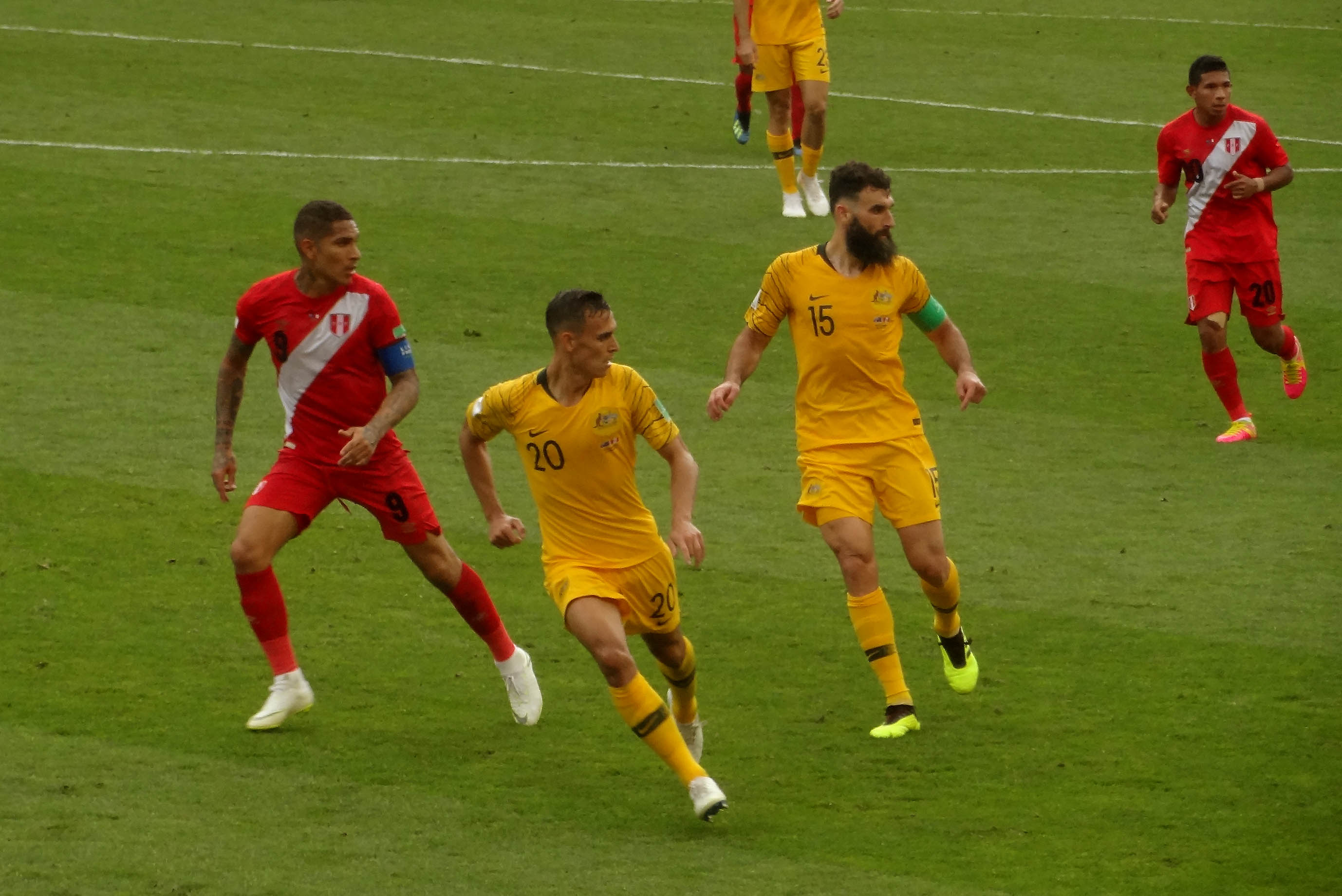
Peru vs Australia at the 2018 FIFA World Cup.

Qualification for the FIFA World Cup finals continued being an elusive objective for Peru during the early 21st century. According to historian Charles F. Walker, player indiscipline problems marred Peru's national team and football league. Troubles in the FPF, particularly with its then-president Manuel Burga, deepened the crisis in Peruvian football—FIFA temporarily suspended the country from international competition, in late 2008, because the Peruvian government investigated alleged corruption within the FPF. (Note: In 2008, FIFA suspended the Peru national team and football league—citing political interference—after Peru's government impeded the re-election of FPF president Burga, charging him with not complying FPF statutes according to Peruvian law. In December 2008, FIFA lifted sanctions after the Peruvian Institute of Sport (IPD) agreed to negotiate with the FPF.) Burga's twelve-year tenure as FPF president, deemed by journalists and the public as disastrous for the national team, despite a third place at the 2011 Copa América, ended in 2014. (Note: In 2017, Burga faced charges of racketeering, wire fraud, and money laundering as part of the 2015 FIFA corruption case in the United States. Although acquitted, the FIFA Ethics Committee ruled, in 2019, Burga guilty of receiving bribes for Copa Libertadores and Copa America tournaments, thereupon banning him for life on taking part in any football-related activity worldwide.) The FPF's new leadership appointed Juan Carlos Oblitas as the federation's new director and Ricardo Gareca as Peru's manager in March 2015. Sports journalists credited Gareca with revitalizing Peru's football prowess by improving the players' training and professional conduct. Under Gareca, Peru participated in the group stage of the Russia 2018 World Cup finals, and finished third and runners-up at the 2015 and 2019 Copa América's, respectively. After Peru narrowly missed qualification for the Qatar 2022 World Cup, losing the inter-continental play-off against Australia, the FPF appointed former team captain Juan Reynoso as Peru's new manager. Dissatisfied with results for the 2026 FIFA World Cup qualifiers, the FPF replaced Reynoso with Uruguayan Jorge Fossati in 2023, then former national goalkeeper, Óscar Ibáñez, and Manuel Barreto as interim after failing to qualify.

== Kit ==
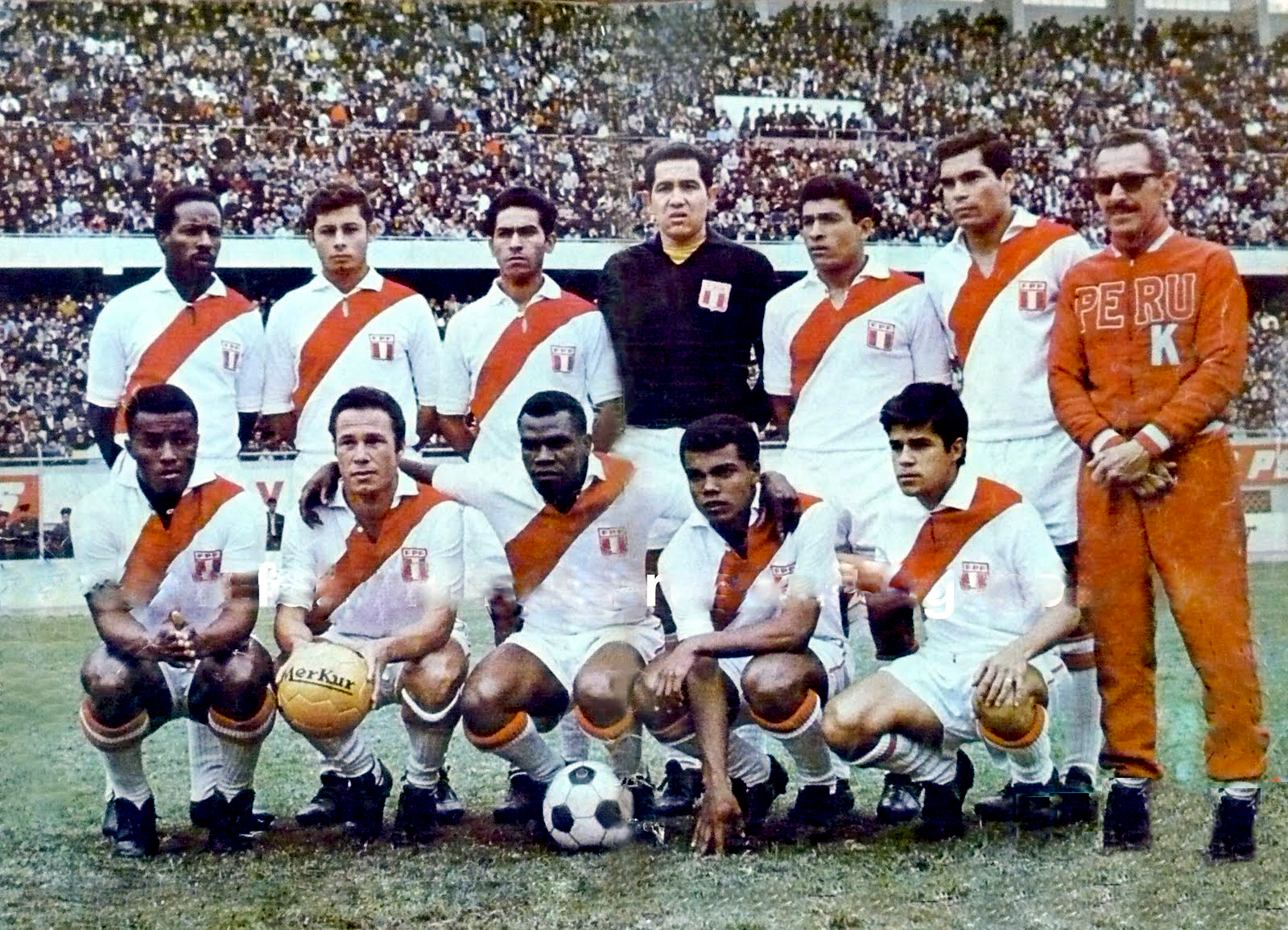
Peru in 1968, wearing their traditional kit. The distinctive red "sash" has been emblazoned across Peru's white shirts continuously since 1936.

The Peru national football team plays in red and white, Peru's national colours. Its first-choice kit has been, since 1936, white shorts, white socks, and white shirts with a distinctive red "sash" crossing their front diagonally from the proper left shoulder to the right hip and returning on the back from the right hip to the proper left shoulder. This basic scheme has been only slightly altered over the years.

Peru's kit has won praise as one of world football's most attractive designs. Christopher Turpin, the executive producer of NPR's All Things Considered news show, lauded the 1970 iteration as "the beautiful game's most beautiful shirt", also describing it as "retro even in 1970". Miles Kohrman, football reporter for The New Republic, commended Peru's kit as "one of soccer's best-kept secrets". Rory Smith, Chief Soccer Correspondent for The New York Times, referred to Peru's 2018 version of the jersey as "a classic" with a nostalgic, fan-pleasing "blood-red sash". The version worn in 1978 came first in a 2010 ESPN list of the "Best World Cup jerseys of all time", described therein as "simple yet strikingly effective".

Peru's first kit, made for the 1927 South American Championship, comprised a white-and-red striped shirt, white shorts and black socks. At the 1930 World Cup, Peru used an alternate design because Paraguay had already registered a similar kit with white-and-red striped shirts. The Peruvians instead wore white shirts with a red collar, white shorts and black socks. The team added a horizontal red stripe to the shirt for the 1935 South American Championship. The following year, at the 1936 Berlin Olympics, the team adopted the iconic diagonal red sash design it has retained ever since. According to historian Jaime Pulgar-Vidal Otálora, the idea for the design came from school football matches in which coloured sashes worn over the shoulder would allow two teams wearing white shirts to play against each other.

Peru wears as its badge the emblem of the Peruvian Football Federation. The first badge, presented in 1927, had a heater shield design with the country's name and the federation's acronym (FPF). Eight different emblems followed, with the longest-lasting design being the modern French escutcheon form emblazoned in the team's jersey from 1953 until 2014. This design had the Peruvian flag at its base, and either the country's name or the federation's acronym at its chief. Since 2014, the badge has a retro-inspired heater shield design, with the entire field comprised by Peru's flag and the federation's acronym, surrounded by a gold-colored frame.

Eight sportswear manufacturers have supplied Peru's national team. The first, German company Adidas, supplied the team's kit in 1978 and 1983–1985. The FPF has signed contracts with manufacturers from Brazil (Penalty, 1981–82), Switzerland (Power, 1989–1991), Italy (Diadora, 1991–1992), England (Umbro, 1996–1997, 2010–2018), Ecuador (Marathon Sports, 2018–2022), and another from Germany (Puma, 1987–1989). The team has also been supplied by three local firms: Calvo Sporwear (1986–1987), Polmer (1993–1995), and Walon Sport (1998–2010). Since January 2023, Adidas produces Peru's kit.

=== Kit sponsorship ===
Kit supplier	Period	Notes
(Germany) Adidas	1978–1981	
(Brazil) Penalty	1981–1982	
(Germany) Adidas	1983–1985	
(Peru) Calvo	1986–1987	
(Germany) Puma	1987–1989	
(Switzerland) Power	1989–1991	
(Italy) Diadora	1991–1993	
(Peru) Polmer	1993–1995	
(United Kingdom) Umbro	1996–1997	
(Peru) Walon	1998–2010	
(United Kingdom) Umbro	2010–2018	
(Ecuador) Marathon	2018–2022	
(Germany) Adidas	2023–present	

== Stadium ==
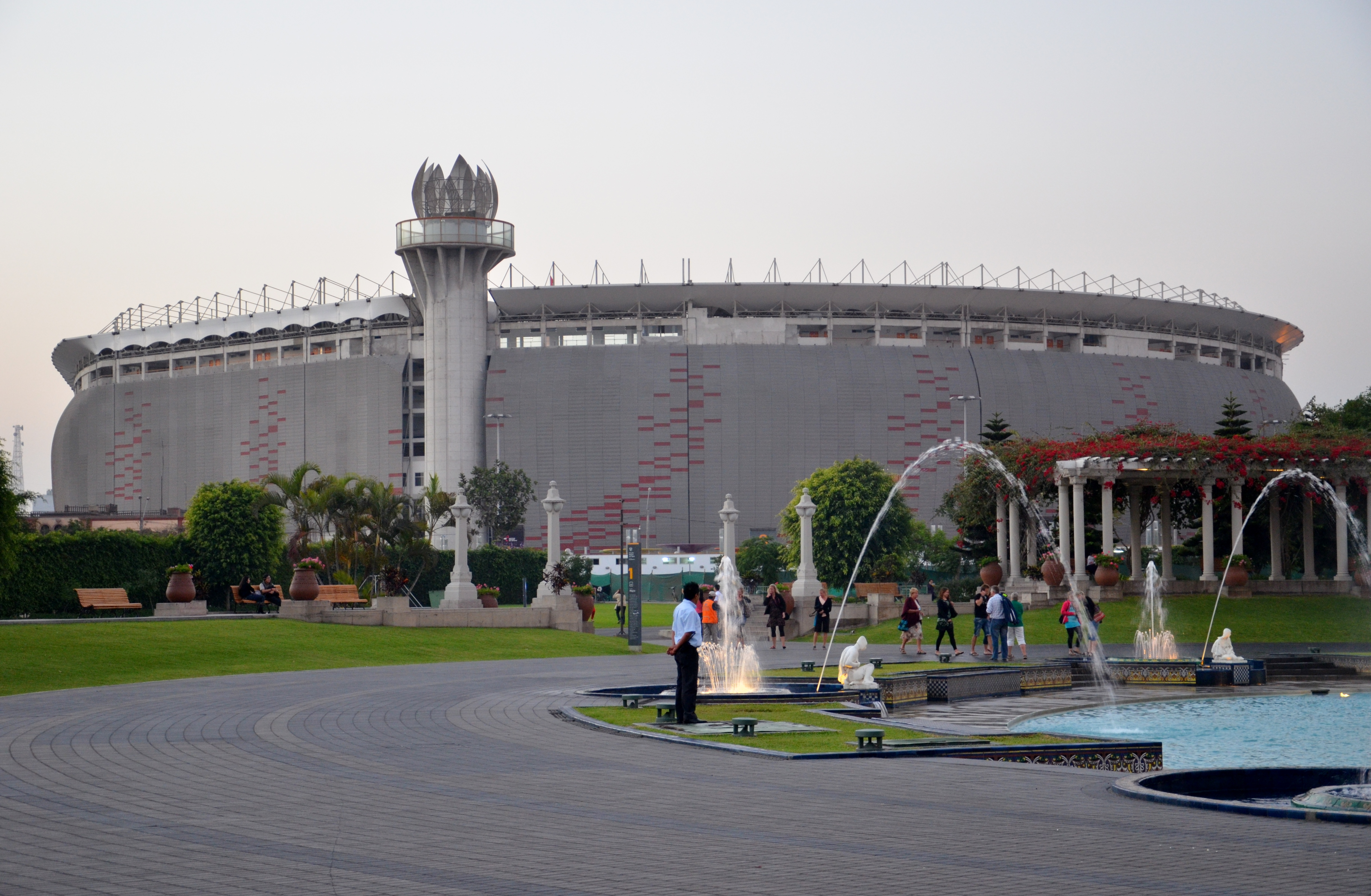
Exterior of the Estadio Nacional in 2013.

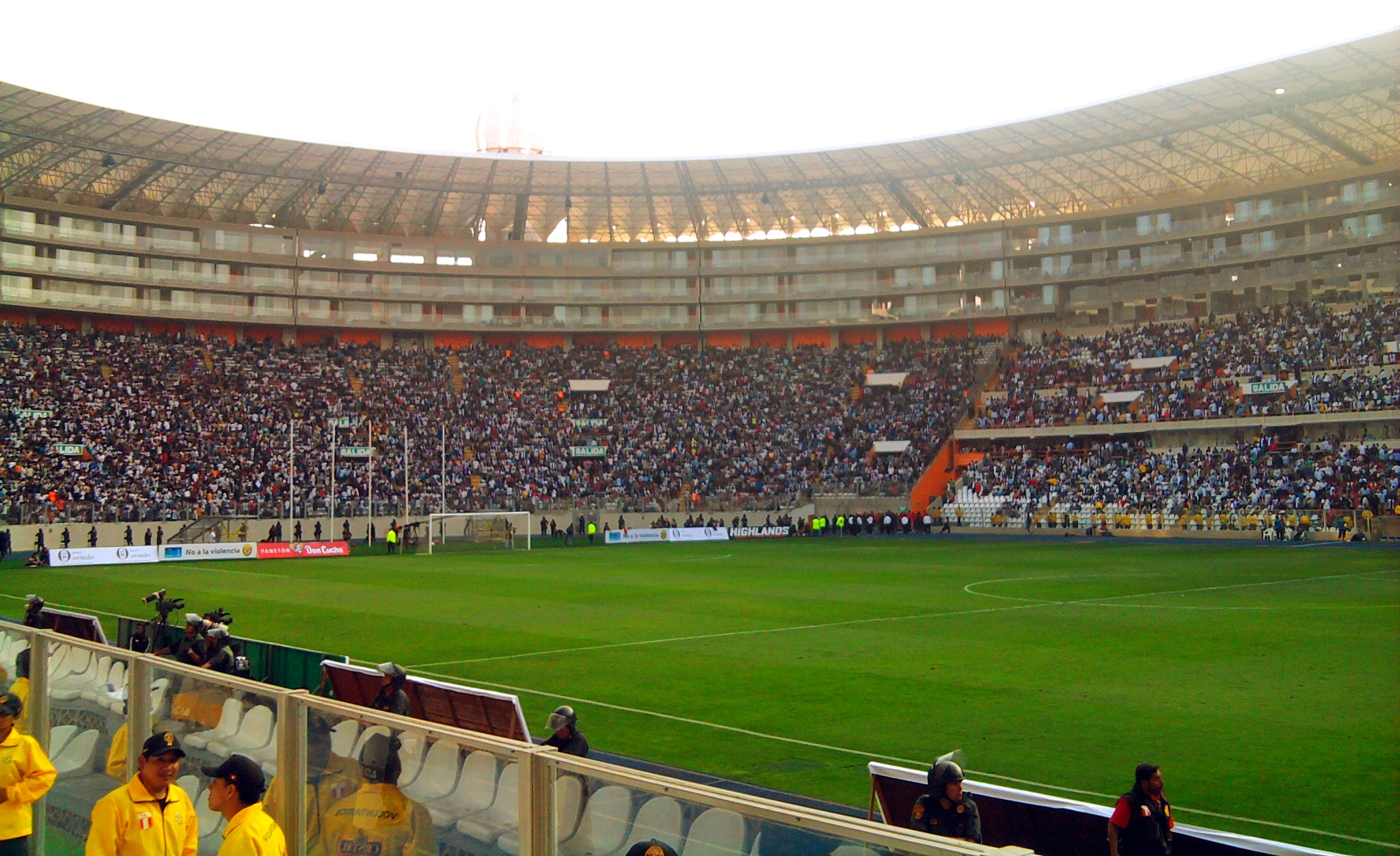
Interior of the Estadio Nacional in 2011.

The traditional home of Peruvian football is the country's national stadium, the Estadio Nacional in Lima, which seats 50,000 spectators. The present ground is the Estadio Nacional's third incarnation, renovated under the Alan García administration. Its official re-inauguration, 24 July 2011, marked 88 years to the day after the original ground opened on the same site in 1923.

To celebrate the centenary of Peru's independence from Spain, Lima's British community donated the original Estadio Nacional, a wooden structure with a capacity of 6,000. Construction began on 28 July 1921, overseen by President Augusto B. Leguía. The stadium's re-inauguration on 27 October 1952, under the Manuel A. Odría administration, followed an onerous campaign for its renovation led by Miguel Dasso, president of the Sociedad de Beneficencia de Lima. The renovated stadium boasted a cement structure and larger spectator capacity of 53,000. Its last redevelopment, in 2011, included the construction of a plaque-covered exterior, an internal multicoloured illumination system, two giant LED screens, and 375 private suites.

A distinctive feature of the ground is the Miguel Dasso Tower on its north side, which contains luxury boxes (renovated in 2004). The Estadio Nacional currently has a natural bermudagrass pitch, reinstalled as part of redevelopments completed in 2011. Previously, the FPF had installed artificial turf in the stadium for the 2005 FIFA U-17 World Championship, making it the only national stadium in CONMEBOL with such a turf. Despite the synthetic ground's rating of "FIFA Star II", the highest certification granted to artificial pitches, players accused the turf of causing them injuries, such as burns and bruises.

Peru sometimes play home matches at other venues. Outside the desert-like coast region of Lima, the thin atmosphere at the high-altitude Estadio Garcilaso de la Vega in Cusco has been described as providing strategic advantages for Peru against certain visiting teams, along with Estadio Monumental Virgen de Chapi in Arequipa. Other common alternate venues for the national team include two other grounds in the Peruvian capital—Alianza's Estadio Alejandro Villanueva and Universitario's Estadio Monumental ''U''.

The national team's training grounds are located within the Villa Deportiva Nacional (VIDENA) sports complex in Lima's San Luis district. Since 1981, the complex is managed by the Peruvian Institute of Sport (IPD). In 2017, following Peru's qualification for the Russia 2018 World Cup finals, the Peruvian Football Federation announced the creation of a new complex, the Center of National Teams, in Lima's Chaclacayo district. The new complex will contain six training grounds for both the male and the female squads, including the senior and the youth sides. In 2023, the FPF also announced its Plan Maestro, which incorporates modernized infrastructure in the VIDENA.

== Supporters ==
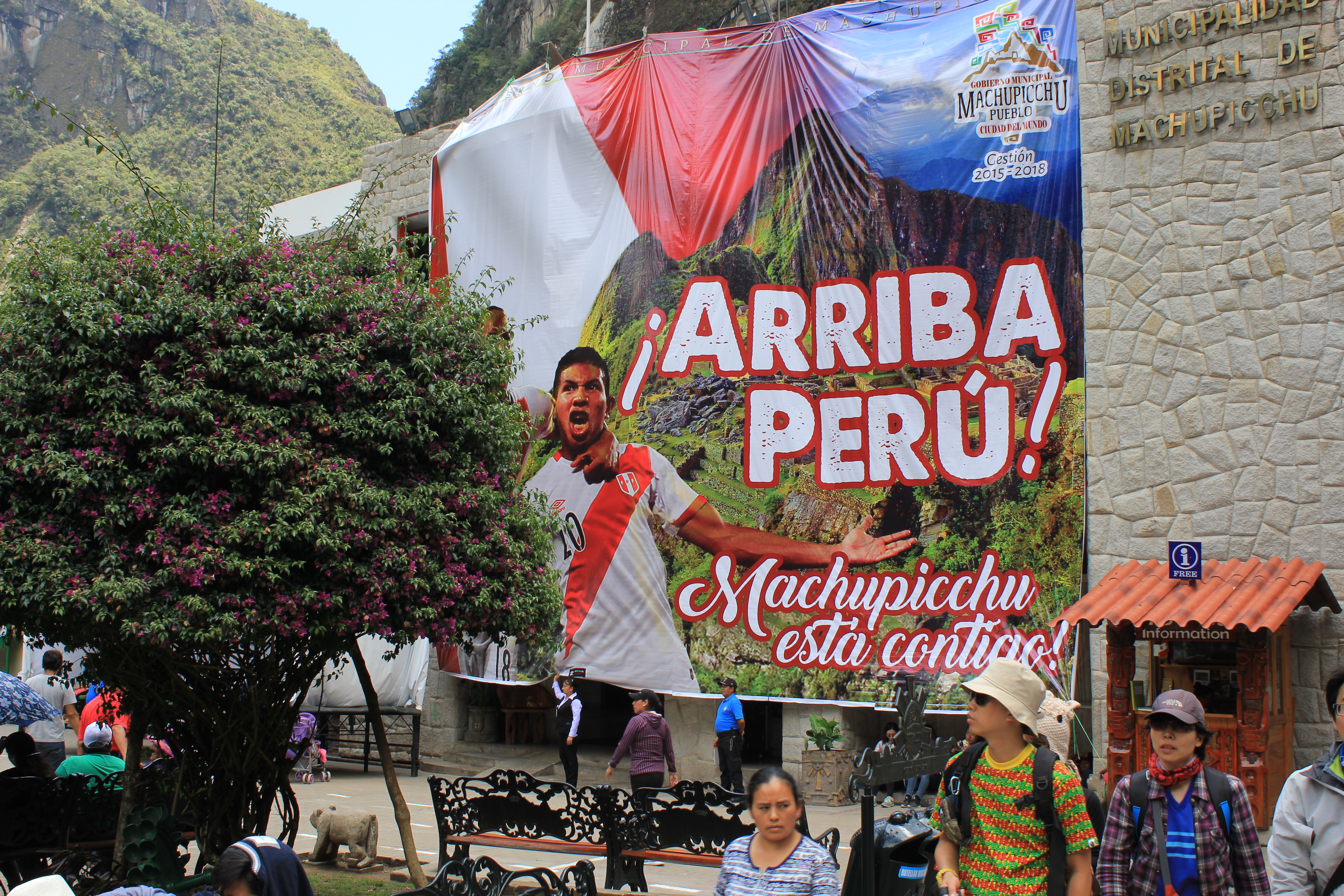
Giant poster in the town below Machu Picchu, featuring Edison Flores and the cheer ¡Arriba Perú!

Football has been the most popular sport in Peru since the early 20th century, with Peru having one of the largest fanbases in the Americas and possibly the world. Originally largely exclusive to Lima's Anglophile elite and expatriates, and secluded from the rest of the city, football became an integral part of wider popular culture during the 1900s and 1910s. Over the following decades, Augusto Leguía's government institutionalised the sport into a national pastime by promoting and organising its development. Consequently, the national football team became an important element of Peru's national identity. According to the historian Carlos Aguirre, nationalist fervor spiked during the qualification phase for the 1970 World Cup finals, because the revolutionary government of General Juan Velasco Alvarado tied the national team's success with the alleged cultural, social, and psychological changes spurred by the country's new political project.

Peruvian football fans are known for their distinctive cheer ¡Arriba Perú! ("Onward Peru!"), unabating popular chant ¡Vamos peruanos! (Let's go Peruvians!), as well as for their use of traditional Peruvian música criolla to express support, both at national team games and at club matches. Música criolla attained national and international recognition with the advent of mass media during the 1930s, becoming a recognised symbol of Peru and its culture. The national team's most popular anthems are Peru Campeón, a polca criolla (Peruvian polka) glorifying Peru's qualification for the 1970 World Cup, and Contigo Perú, a Peruvian waltz that newspaper El Comercio calls "the hymn of Peruvian national football teams". (Note: Peru's unsuccessful World Cup finals qualification attempts, from Mexico 1986 until Russia 2018, cemented the fans' nostalgia for the 1970s' golden era and increased the popularity of Peru Campeón.) In 2018, a FIFA-sanctioned worldwide online poll honoured the "fervent and dedicated group" of Peruvian supporters at that year's World Cup tournament with the FIFA Fan Award.

The Estadio Nacional disaster of 24 May 1964, involving Peruvian supporters, is cited as one of the worst tragedies in football history. During a qualifying match for the 1964 Olympics between the Peruvian Olympic team and its Argentine counterpart, the Uruguayan referee Ángel Pazos disallowed a would-be Peruvian equaliser, alleging rough play. Spectators threw missiles from the stands while two fans invaded the pitch and attacked the referee. Police threw tear gas into the crowd, causing a stampede; trying to escape, fans were crushed against the stadium's locked gates. A total of 315 people died in the chaos, with more than 500 others injured.

== Rivalries ==
=== Chile ===
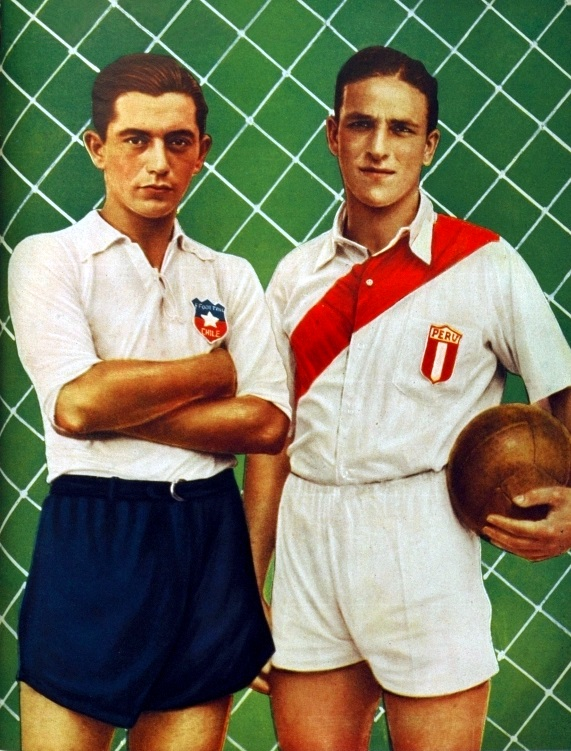
Chile's Raúl Toro and Peru's Teodoro Fernández, opponents in the 1937 South American Championship.

The Peru national football team maintains prominent rivalries with its counterparts from neighbouring Chile and Ecuador. The Peruvians have a favourable record against Ecuador and a negative record against Chile. Peru faced both rivals in the 1939 South American Championship in Lima, which also marked the first time that Peru faced Ecuador in an official tournament; Peru won both games. Peru also defeated its rivals during qualifying for the Argentina 1978 World Cup, directly eliminating both teams.

The Chile–Peru football rivalry is known in Spanish as the Clásico del Pacífico ("Pacific Derby"). CNN World Sport editor Greg Duke ranks it among the top ten football rivalries in the world. Peru first faced Chile in the 1935 South American Championship, defeating it 1–0. The football rivalry between Peru and Chile, partly a reflection of the geopolitical conflict between both neighboring states, is primarily a result of both football squads vying for recognition as the better team in South America's Pacific coast—as their football confederation is historically dominated by countries in South America's Atlantic coast. The two countries traditionally compete with each other over the rank of fourth-best national team in South America (after Argentina, Brazil, and Uruguay). They also both claim to have invented the bicycle kick; Peruvians call it the chalaca, while it is the chilena in Chile.

=== Ecuador ===
The rivalry between the Ecuador and Peru football teams is rooted in the historical border conflict between the two nations dating back to the 19th century. In 1995, after the brief Cenepa War, CONMEBOL contemplated altering that year's Copa América group stage to prevent a match between the two sides, but ultimately did not. According to cultural historian Michael Handelsman, Ecuadorian fans consider losses to Colombia or Peru "an excuse to lament Ecuador's inability to establish itself as an international soccer power". Handelsman adds that "[t]he rivalries are intense, and the games always carry an element of national pride and honor".

== Results and fixtures ==
The following is a list of match results in the last 12 months, as well as any future matches that have been scheduled.

Win Draw Loss Fixture

=== 2025 ===
21 December Unofficial friendly	Peru	2–0	Bolivia	Chincha Alta, Peru
15:30 UTC−5	Magallanes 87'; Soyer 89'	Report		Stadium: Estadio Félix Castillo Tardío; Attendance: 2,000; Referee: Bruno Pérez (Peru)
Note: The match was organized and contested by a team from SAFAP, an organization separate from the Peruvian Football Federation.

=== 2026 ===
28 March Friendly	Senegal	2–0	Peru	Saint-Denis, France
17:00 UTC+1	Jackson 41'; I. Sarr 54'	Report		Stadium: Stade de France; Attendance: 70,000; Referee: Jérémie Pignard (France)

31 March Friendly	Peru	2–2	Honduras	Leganés, Spain
20:00 UTC+2	Vélez 6', 58'	Report	Palma 44'; Mencía 90+4'	Stadium: Butarque; Attendance: 12,000; Referee: Guillermo Cuadra Fernández (Spain)

5 June Friendly	Haiti	1–2	Peru	Miami, United States
20:00 UTC−4	Isidor 16'	Report	Garcés 81'; Vélez 84'	Stadium: Nu Stadium; Attendance: 26,700; Referee: Filip Dujic (Canada)

8 June Friendly	Peru	1–3	Spain	Puebla, Mexico
20:00 UTC−6	Vélez 66'	Report	Oyarzabal 2'; Pedri 32'; Gallese 53' (o.g.)	Stadium: Estadio Cuauhtémoc; Attendance: 45,845; Referee: Fernando Hernández (Mexico)

26 September Friendly	United States	4–1	Peru	Orlando, United States
16:30 UTC−4	Ellis 4'; Tillman 66' (pen.); Hall 72'; Berhalter 90'	Report	Lapadula 15'	Stadium: Inter.co Stadium; Attendance: Steffon Dewar (Jamaica); Referee: 24,228

29 September Friendly	Mexico	1–1	Peru	Harrison, United States
21:00 UTC−4	Guzmán 49'	Report	Vélez 26'	Stadium: Sports Illustrated Stadium; Attendance: 25,728; Referee: Jon Freemon (United States)

3 October Friendly	Canada	2–0	Peru	Montreal, Canada
14:00 UTC−4	Shaffelburg 19', 35'	Report		Stadium: Saputo Stadium; Attendance: 19,619; Referee: Jon Freemon (United States)

6 October Friendly	Colombia	2–0	Peru	Miami Gardens, United States
19:45 UTC−4	Velásquez 57'; Arcila 90+2'	Report		Stadium: Hard Rock Stadium; Attendance: 15,000; Referee: Rubiel Vázquez (United States)

13 November Friendly	Peru	2–0	Bolivia	Lima, Peru
20:00 UTC−5	Lapadula 13' (pen.); Castro 87'	Report		Stadium: Estadio Alejandro Villanueva; Attendance: 10,000; Referee: Carlos Betancur (Colombia)

9 December Friendly	Peru	v	Panama	Cusco, Peru
18:00 UTC−5				Stadium: Estadio Garcilaso

=== 2027 ===
March Friendly	Bolivia	v	Peru	Cobija, Bolivia
--:--				Stadium: Estadio Roberto Jordán Cuéllar

== Managers ==
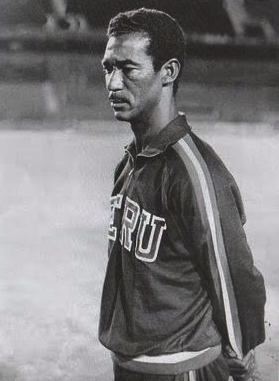
Didi managed Peru at the 1970 World Cup in Mexico.

A total of 50 managers have led the Peru national football team since 1927 (including multiple spells separately); of these, 26 have been from Peru and 24 have been from abroad. Sports analysts and historians generally consider Peru's most successful managers to have been the Englishman Jack Greenwell and the Peruvian Marcos Calderón. The former managed Peru to triumph in the 1938 Bolivarian Games and the 1939 South American Championship, and the latter led Peru to victory in the 1975 Copa América tournament and coached it at the 1978 FIFA World Cup. Three other managers have led Peru to tournament victories—Juan Carlos Oblitas, Freddy Ternero, and Sergio Markarián each oversaw Peru's victory in the Kirin Cup in Japan, in 1999, 2005 and 2011, respectively.

Soon after forming Peru's national football team, the FPF invited Uruguayan coaches Pedro Olivieri and Julio Borelli to manage the squad. Olivieri received the FPF's first appointment, for the 1927 South American Championship, due to his prior experience managing Uruguay. Borelli became the national team's second manager, for the 1929 South American Championship, after some years of refereeing football matches in Peru. The Spaniard Francisco Bru, Peru's third manager and first World Cup coach at the inaugural tournament in 1930, previously had been Spain's first manager. The FPF next appointed the national team's first Peruvian coach, Telmo Carbajo, for the 1935 South American Championship. Coach Ricardo Gareca was credited well, bringing Peru to the 2018 FIFA World Cup after 36 years, finished second in the 2019 and placed third in 2015 and fourth in 2021 Copa Américas, along with almost bringing Peru to their sixth World Cup in 2022. The team's manager since January 2026, is Brazilian Mano Menezes.

Managers that brought outstanding changes to the Peru national team's style of play include the Hungarian György Orth and the Brazilians Didi and Tim. Orth coached Peru from 1957 to 1959; sports historian Andreas Campomar cites Peru's "4–1 thrashing of England in Lima" as evidence of Orth's positive influence over the national team's offensive game. Víctor Benítez, Peru's defensive midfielder under Orth, attributes the Hungarian with maximizing the team's potential by accurately placing each player in their optimal positions. Didi coached Peru from 1968 to 1970 and managed it at the 1970 FIFA World Cup; Campomar attributes Didi's tactics as the reason for Peru's development of a "free-flowing football" style. Placar, a Brazilian sports journal, attributed Tim, who managed Peru at the 1982 FIFA World Cup, with making Peru "a team that plays beautiful, combining efficiency with that swagger that people thought only existed in Brazil".

== Players ==
=== Current squad ===
The following players were called up for the friendly match against Bolivia on 13 November 2026.
Caps and goals are correct as of 14 November 2026, after the match against Bolivia.

No.	Pos.	Player	Date of birth (age)	Caps	Goals	Club
1	GK	Pedro Gallese	23 February 1990 (age 36)	131	0	(Colombian Football Federation) Deportivo Cali
12	GK	Matías Córdova	6 May 2002 (age 24)	0	0	(Peruvian Football Federation) Comerciantes Unidos
21	GK	Diego Romero	17 August 2001 (age 25)	1	0	(Peruvian Football Federation) Universitario
2	DF	Alfonso Barco	7 December 2001 (age 24)	7	0	(Croatian Football Federation) Rijeka
3	DF	Fabio Gruber	3 September 2002 (age 24)	6	0	(German Football Association) Mainz 05
4	DF	Marcos López	20 November 1999 (age 26)	58	0	(Danish Football Association) Copenhagen
8	DF	Erick Noriega	22 July 2001 (age 25)	14	0	(Brazilian Football Confederation) Grêmio
15	DF	Matías Lazo	11 July 2003 (age 23)	3	0	(Peruvian Football Federation) Melgar
25	DF	Matías Zegarra	16 December 2006 (age 19)	3	0	(Peruvian Football Federation) Melgar
	DF	Marco Huamán	25 September 2002 (age 24)	5	0	(Peruvian Football Federation) Alianza Lima
5	MF	Oslimg Mora	2 June 1999 (age 27)	7	0	(Peruvian Football Federation) Sport Boys
6	MF	Jesús Pretell	26 March 1999 (age 27)	12	0	(Ecuadorian Football Federation) LDU Quito
7	MF	Andy Polo	29 September 1994 (age 32)	57	2	(Peruvian Football Federation) Universitario
14	MF	Francesco Andrealli	5 August 2007 (age 19)	0	0	(Italian Football Federation) Como Primavera
19	MF	Yoshimar Yotún (captain)	7 April 1990 (age 36)	139	8	(Peruvian Football Federation) Sporting Cristal
20	MF	Rodrigo Vilca	12 March 1999 (age 27)	6	0	(Peruvian Football Federation) Comerciantes Unidos
22	MF	Erinson Ramírez	15 March 1998 (age 28)	1	0	(Peruvian Football Federation) Juan Pablo II College
	MF	Wilder Cartagena	23 September 1994 (age 32)	44	0	(United States Soccer Federation) Orlando City
	MF	Jairo Vélez	21 April 1995 (age 31)	8	5	(Peruvian Football Federation) Alianza Lima
7	FW	Jhonny Vidales	22 April 1992 (age 34)	9	0	(Peruvian Football Federation) Melgar
9	FW	Gianluca Lapadula	7 February 1990 (age 36)	46	11	(Peruvian Football Federation) Universitario
17	FW	Adrián Ugarriza	1 January 1997 (age 29)	7	0	(Israel Football Association) Hapoel Be'er Sheva
19	FW	Luis Iberico	6 February 1998 (age 28)	7	2	(Peruvian Football Federation) Sporting Cristal
23	FW	Piero Magallanes	3 April 2001 (age 25)	6	1	(Peruvian Football Federation) Sport Huancayo
24	FW	Bassco Soyer	17 October 2006 (age 20)	4	1	(Portuguese Football Federation) Gil Vicente
26	FW	Maxloren Castro	8 December 2007 (age 18)	5	1	(Peruvian Football Federation) Sporting Cristal

=== Recent call-ups ===
The players listed below were not included in the current squad, but have been called up by Peru in the last twelve months.

Pos.	Player	Date of birth (age)	Caps	Goals	Club	Latest call-up
GK	Alejandro Duarte	5 April 1994 (age 32)	0	0	(Peru) Alianza Lima	v. Spain, 8 June 2026
GK	Diego Enríquez	24 February 2002 (age 24)	1	0	(Peru) Sporting Cristal	v. Honduras, 31 March 2026
GK	Emile Franco	3 November 2000 (age 26)	0	0	(Peru) ADA	v. Bolivia, 21 December 2025
GK	Daniel Prieto	19 September 1995 (age 31)	0	0	(Peru) Alianza Atlético	v. Bolivia, 21 December 2025
GK	Steven Rivadeneyra	2 November 1994 (age 32)	0	0	(Peru) Alianza Atlético	v. Bolivia, 21 December 2025
DF	Miguel Araujo	24 October 1994 (age 32)	46	1	(Peru) Sporting Cristal	v. Colombia, 7 October 2026
DF	Oliver Sonne	10 November 2000 (age 26)	20	0	(England) Burnley	v. Colombia, 7 October 2026
DF	Renzo Garcés	12 June 1996 (age 30)	19	1	(Peru) Alianza Lima	v. Colombia, 7 October 2026
DF	César Inga	30 April 2002 (age 24)	8	1	(Peru) Universitario	v. Colombia, 7 October 2026
DF	Gianfranco Chávez	10 August 1998 (age 28)	2	0	(Peru) Alianza Lima	v. Bolivia, 21 December 2025
DF	Sebastián Aranda	7 October 2003 (age 23)	1	0	(Latvia) Auda	v. Bolivia, 21 December 2025
DF	Erick Canales	7 June 2001 (age 25)	1	0	(Peru) Deportivo Garcilaso	v. Bolivia, 21 December 2025
DF	Mathías Llontop	22 May 2002 (age 24)	1	0	(Peru) Sport Boys	v. Bolivia, 21 December 2025
DF	Gustavo Dulanto	5 November 1995 (age 31)	0	0	(Peru) Sport Boys	v. Bolivia, 21 December 2025
DF	Rafael Guzmán	26 January 2008 (age 18)	0	0	(Spain) Betis U19	v. Bolivia, 21 December 2025
DF	Jhair Soto	3 June 2003 (age 23)	0	0	(Peru) ADT	v. Bolivia, 21 December 2025
MF	André Carrillo	14 June 1991 (age 35)	109	11	(Brazil) Corinthians	v. Colombia, 7 October 2026
MF	Jairo Concha	27 May 1999 (age 27)	14	0	(Peru) Universitario	v. Colombia, 7 October 2026
MF	Adrián Quiroz	8 June 1999 (age 27)	4	0	(Peru) Universitario	v. Spain, 8 June 2026
MF	Jesús Castillo	11 June 2001 (age 25)	17	1	(Tunisia) Espérance de Tunis	v. Honduras, 31 March 2026
MF	Jorge Murrugarra	22 March 1997 (age 29)	2	0	(Peru) Universitario	v. Bolivia, 21 December 2025
MF	Carlos Cabello	22 September 1997 (age 29)	1	0	(Peru) Cienciano	v. Bolivia, 21 December 2025
MF	Jesús Castillo	3 October 1996 (age 30)	1	0	(Peru) Alianza Lima	v. Bolivia, 21 December 2025
MF	Hernan Lupu	15 January 2004 (age 22)	1	0	(Peru) Alianza Atlético	v. Bolivia, 21 December 2025
MF	Álvaro Rojas	12 March 2005 (age 21)	0	0	(Peru) Juan Pablo II College	v. Bolivia, 21 December 2025
FW	Alex Valera	16 May 1996 (age 30)	28	5	(Peru) Universitario	v. Colombia, 7 October 2026
FW	Kenji Cabrera	27 January 2003 (age 23)	8	0	(Canada) Vancouver Whitecaps	v. Spain, 8 June 2026
FW	Joao Grimaldo	20 February 2003 (age 23)	15	1	(Czech Republic) Sparta Prague	v. Honduras, 31 March 2026
FW	Juan Pablo Goicochea	12 January 2005 (age 21)	1	0	(Peru) Juan Pablo II College	v. Honduras, 31 March 2026
FW	Cristian Neira	23 November 2000 (age 25)	1	0	(Peru) Alianza Lima	v. Bolivia, 21 December 2025
FW	Matías Succar	16 February 1999 (age 27)	1	0	(Peru) Cienciano	v. Bolivia, 21 December 2025
FW	Juan Martínez	12 February 2005 (age 21)	0	0	(Peru) Sport Huancayo	v. Bolivia, 21 December 2025
^{INJ} Player withdrew from the squad due to injury/absent from the national team due to injury.^{PRE} Preliminary squad^{SUS} Player is serving a suspension^{WD} Player withdrew from the squad^{RET} Player has retired from international football^{TRP} Invited as a Training player

=== Notable ===
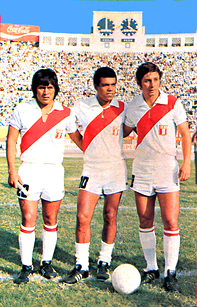
Hugo Sotil, Teófilo Cubillas, and Roberto Chale (left to right) at the Estadio Nacional in 1973.

A report published by CONMEBOL in 2008 described Peru as traditionally exhibiting an "elegant, technical and fine football style", and praised it as "one of the most loyal exponents of South American football talent". In 2017, Argentine manager Ricardo Gareca described Peruvian footballers as "technically sound, [physically] strong and adaptable", adding that their adaptability resulted from Peru's diverse geography.

Peruvian players noted in the CONMEBOL report as "true artists of the ball" include forwards Teófilo Cubillas, Pedro Pablo León and Hugo Sotil, defender Héctor Chumpitaz and midfielders Roberto Chale, César Cueto, José del Solar, and Roberto Palacios. Cubillas, an attacking midfielder and forward popularly known as El Nene ("The Kid"), is widely regarded as Peru's greatest ever player. Chumpitaz is often cited as the team's best defender; Witzig lists him among his "Best Players of the Modern Era", and praises him as "a strong reader of the game with excellent ball skills and distribution, [who] marshalled a capable defence to support Peru's attack". El Gráfico, an Argentine sports journal, described Cueto, Cubillas, and José Velásquez as, collectively, "the best [midfield] in the world" in 1978.

Before Cubillas' appearance, Teodoro "Lolo" Fernández, a forward nicknamed El Cañonero ("The Cannoneer"), held the status of Peru's greatest player—due to his powerful shots, marksmanship, and club loyalty to Universitario. Fernández participated as a key member of the Rodillo Negro team of the 1930s, along with Alejandro Villanueva and Juan Valdivieso. Fernández scored most of the team's goals; his partner in attack, the gifted playmaker Villanueva, awed audiences with his acrobatic skills. Goalkeeper Valdivieso had a reputation as a penalty stopper with exceptional athleticism.

In 1972, teams representing Europe and South America played a commemorative match in Basel, Switzerland, for the benefit of homeless children. Cubillas, Chumpitaz, Sotil, and Julio Baylón played in the South American team, which won the game 2–0; Cubillas scored the first goal. The teams held another match the following year, at Barcelona's Camp Nou, with the declared intent of fighting global poverty. Cubillas, Chumpitaz, and Sotil again participated, with Chumpitaz named South America's captain. Each of the Peruvians scored in a 4–4 draw, which South America won 7–6 on penalties.

== Team records ==
The Peru national football team has played 719 matches since 1927, including friendlies. The largest margin of victory achieved by a Peru side was a 9–1 win against Ecuador on 11 August 1938, at the Bolivarian Games in Colombia. The team's record defeat was a 7–0 loss to Brazil at the 1997 Copa América in Bolivia.

As of 14 November 2026
Players in bold are still active with Peru.

=== Most appearances ===
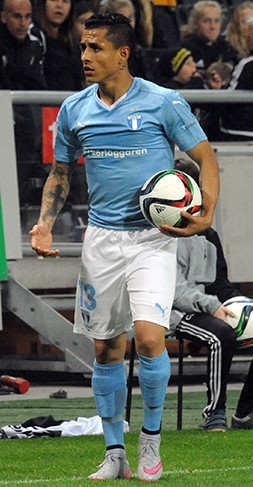
Yoshimar Yotún is Peru's most capped player with 139 appearances.

Rank	Player	Caps	Goals	Career
1	**Yoshimar Yotún**	139	8	2011–present
2	**Pedro Gallese**	131	0	2014–present
3	**Luis Advíncula**	130	2	2010–present
4	Paolo Guerrero	128	40	2004–2025
4	Roberto Palacios	128	19	1992–2012
6	**André Carrillo**	109	11	2011–present
7	Héctor Chumpitaz	105	3	1965–1981
8	Jefferson Farfán	102	27	2003–2021
9	Jorge Soto	101	9	1992–2005
10	Christian Cueva	100	16	2011–2024

=== Top goalscorers ===
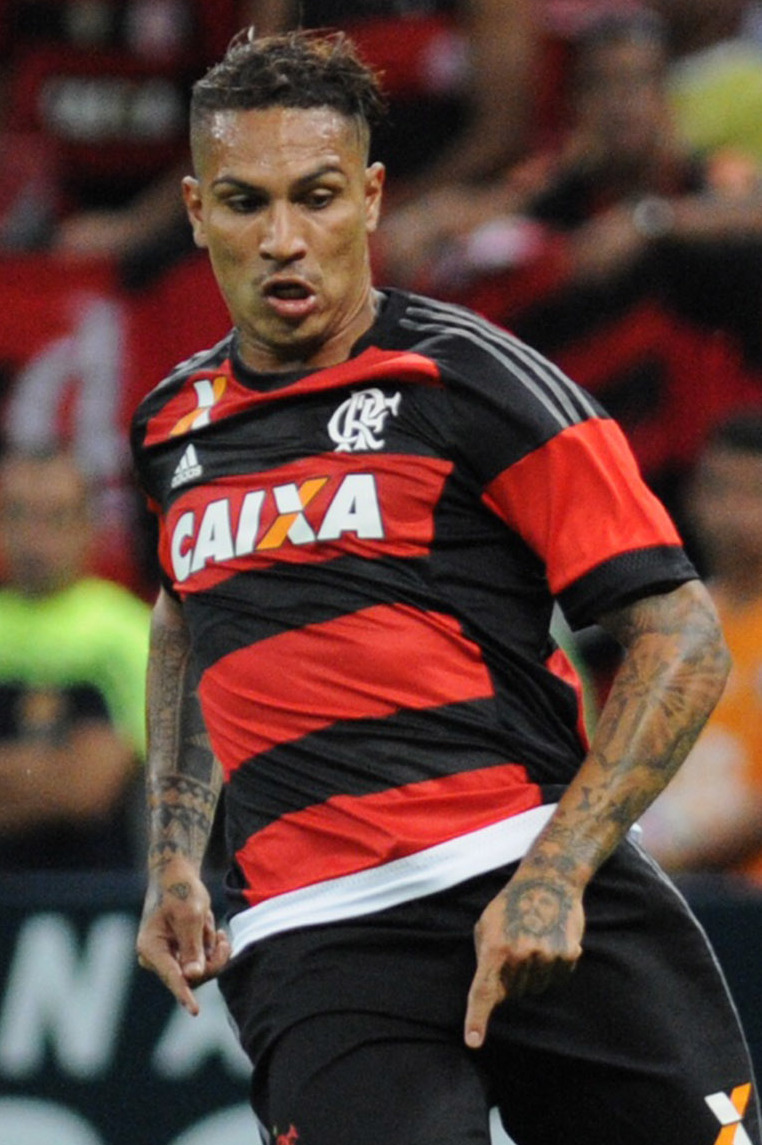
Paolo Guerrero is Peru's top scorer with 40 goals.

Rank	Player	Goals	Caps	Ratio	Career
1	Paolo Guerrero (list)	40	128	0.31	2004–2025
2	Jefferson Farfán	27	102	0.26	2003–2021
3	Teófilo Cubillas	26	81	0.32	1968–1982
4	Teodoro Fernández	24	32	0.75	1935–1947
5	Claudio Pizarro	20	85	0.24	1999–2016
5	Nolberto Solano	20	95	0.21	1994–2008
7	Roberto Palacios	19	128	0.15	1992–2012
8	Hugo Sotil	18	62	0.29	1970–1978
9	Oswaldo Ramírez	17	57	0.3	1969–1982
9	**Edison Flores**	17	84	0.2	2013–present

The team's all-time top goalscorer is Paolo Guerrero, with 40 goals in 128 appearances. He is followed by Jefferson Farfán, with 27 goals in 102 appearances, and Teófilo Cubillas, who scored 26 goals in 81 appearances. Of the top ten scorers for Peru, Teodoro Fernández, with 24 goals in 32 games, holds the best goal-per-appearance ratio (0.75 goals/match). Claudio Pizarro scored Peru's fastest ever goal, coming less than a minute into a match against Mexico on 20 August 2003.

Peru's current captain is forward Paolo Guerrero. Midfielder Leopoldo Basurto was the team's first captain. Defender Héctor Chumpitaz held the Peruvian team's leadership position for the longest time, between 1965 and 1981. Forward Claudio Pizarro had the second-longest tenure as captain, from 2003 to 2016. In 2022, streaming service Netflix launched "Contigo capitán", a series about Paolo Guerrero's doping ban that almost impeded his participation in the 2018 FIFA World Cup. Other notable captains include Rubén Díaz (1981–1985), Julio César Uribe (1987–1989), Juan Reynoso (1993–1999), and Nolberto Solano (2000–2003).

== Competitive record ==
=== FIFA World Cup ===
Peru's match against Romania at the 1930 World Cup

.

Peru has taken part in the World Cup finals five times. The Peruvian team competed at the first World Cup in 1930 by invitation, and has entered each tournament at the qualifying stage since 1958, qualifying for the finals four times: in 1970, 1978, 1982 and 2018. Its all-time record in World Cup qualifying matches, as of 2017, stands at 43 wins, 37 draws and 69 losses. In the finals, the team has won five matches, drawn three and lost ten, with 21 goals in favour and 33 against. Peru won the inaugural FIFA Fair Play Trophy, awarded at the 1970 World Cup, having been the only team not to receive any yellow or red cards during the competition. Peru has the peculiar distinction of always facing the tournament's eventual winners during the finals phase. Luis de Souza Ferreira scored Peru's first World Cup goal on 14 July 1930, in a match against Romania. José Velásquez scored Peru's fastest World Cup finals goal—that is, that scored soonest after kick-off—two minutes into the match against Iran on 11 June 1978. Jefferson Farfán is Peru's top scorer and fifth-overall top scorer in CONMEBOL World Cup qualification, with 16 goals. Teófilo Cubillas is the team's top scorer in the World Cup finals, with 10 goals in 13 games. During the 1930 competition, a Peruvian became the first player sent off in a World Cup—his identity is disputed between sources as either defender Plácido Galindo or midfielder Mario de las Casas. (Note: FIFA lists the player as Galindo, but forward Souza Ferreira and other sources list De las Casas.) Peru's Ramón Quiroga holds the unusual record of being the only goalkeeper to commit a foul in the opponent's side of the pitch in a match at the World Cup finals.

FIFA World Cup record										Qualification record						
Year	Round	Position	Pld	W	D	L	GF	GA	Squad	Pos	Pld	W	D	L	GF	GA
(Uruguay) 1930	Group stage	10th	2	0	0	2	1	4	Squad	Qualified as invitees						
(Italy) 1934	Withdrew									Did not enter						
(France) 1938	Did not enter									Withdrew						
(Brazil) 1950	Withdrew									Did not enter						
(Switzerland) 1954	Withdrew									Did not enter						
(Sweden) 1958	Did not qualify									2nd	2	0	1	1	1	2
(Chile) 1962	Did not qualify									2nd	2	0	1	1	1	2
(England) 1966	Did not qualify									2nd	4	2	0	2	8	6
(Mexico) 1970	Quarter-finals	7th	4	2	0	2	9	9	Squad	1st	4	2	1	1	7	4
(West Germany) 1974	Did not qualify									Play-off	3	1	0	2	3	4
(Argentina) 1978	Quarter-finals	8th	6	2	1	3	7	12	Squad	2nd	6	3	2	1	13	3
(Spain) 1982	Group stage	20th	3	0	2	1	2	6	Squad	1st	4	2	2	0	5	2
(Mexico) 1986	Did not qualify									Play-off	8	3	2	3	10	9
(Italy) 1990	Did not qualify									3rd	4	0	0	4	2	8
(United States) 1994	Did not qualify									4th	6	0	1	5	4	12
(France) 1998	Did not qualify									5th	16	7	4	5	19	20
(South Korea) (Japan) 2002	Did not qualify									8th	18	4	4	10	14	25
(Germany) 2006	Did not qualify									9th	18	4	6	8	20	28
(South Africa) 2010	Did not qualify									10th	18	3	4	11	11	34
(Brazil) 2014	Did not qualify									7th	16	4	3	9	17	26
(Russia) 2018	Group stage	21st	3	1	0	2	2	2	Squad	Play-off	20	8	6	6	29	26
(Qatar) 2022	Did not qualify									Play-off	19	7	4	8	19	22
(Canada) (Mexico) (United States) 2026	Did not qualify									9th	18	2	6	10	6	21
(Morocco) (Portugal) (Spain) 2030	To be determined									To be determined						
(Saudi Arabia) 2034	To be determined									To be determined						
Total	Quarter-finals	5/23	18	5	3	10	21	33	—	—	186	52	47	87	189	254

=== Copa América ===
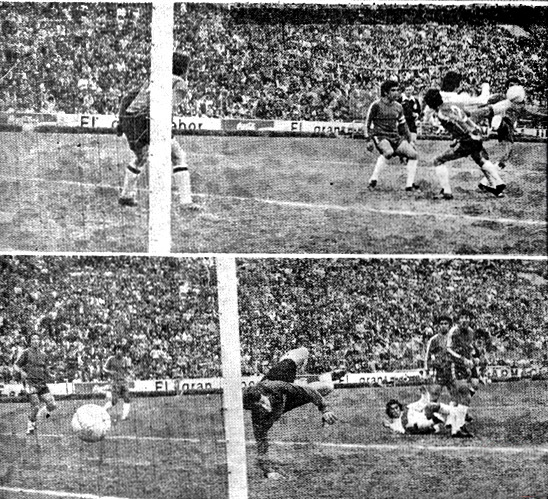
Peru's match against Chile at the 1975 Copa América.

Peru's national team has taken part in 34 editions of the Copa América since 1927, and has won the competition twice (in 1939 and 1975). The country has hosted the tournament six times (in 1927, 1935, 1939, 1953, 1957 and 2004). Peru's overall record in the competition is 58 victories, 40 draws, and 66 losses. Peru won the Fair Play award in the 2015 edition.

Demetrio Neyra scored Peru's first goal in the competition on 13 November 1927, in a match against Bolivia. Christian Cueva scored Peru's fastest Copa América goal, two minutes into the match against Brazil on 14 June 2015. Four tournaments have featured a Peruvian top scorer: Teodoro Fernández in 1939, and Paolo Guerrero in 2011, 2015, and 2019. Fernández, the Copa América's third-overall scorer, was named best player of the 1939 tournament; Teófilo Cubillas, voted the best player in the 1975 competition, is the only other Peruvian to win this award.

Peru earned its first continental title in 1939, when it won the South American Championship with successive victories over Ecuador, Chile, Paraguay and Uruguay. This marked the first time that the competition had been won by a team other than Uruguay, Brazil, or Argentina. Peru became South American champions for the second time in 1975, when it won that year's Copa América, the first to feature all ten CONMEBOL members. Peru came top of their group in the first round, eliminating Chile and Bolivia, and in the semi-finals drew with Brazil over two legs, winning 3–1 in Brazil but losing 2–0 at home. Peru was declared the winner by drawing of lots. In the two-legged final between Colombia and Peru, both teams won their respective home games (1–0 in Bogota and 2–0 in Lima), forcing a play-off in Caracas that Peru won 1–0.

South American Championship / Copa América record
Year	Round	Position	Pld	W	D*	L	GF	GA	Squad
(Argentina) 1916	Did not participate								
(Uruguay) 1917	Did not participate								
(Brazil) 1919	Did not participate								
(Chile) 1920	Did not participate								
(Argentina) 1921	Did not participate								
(Brazil) 1922	Did not participate								
(Uruguay) 1923	Did not participate								
(Uruguay) 1924	Did not participate								
(Argentina) 1925	Did not participate								
(Chile) 1926	Did not participate								
(Peru) 1927	Third place	3rd	3	1	0	2	4	11	Squad
(Argentina) 1929	Fourth place	4th	3	0	0	3	1	12	Squad
(Peru) 1935	Third place	3rd	3	1	0	2	2	5	Squad
(Argentina) 1937	Sixth place	6th	5	1	1	3	7	10	Squad
(Peru) 1939	Champions	1st	4	4	0	0	13	4	Squad
(Chile) 1941	Fourth place	4th	4	1	0	3	5	5	Squad
(Uruguay) 1942	Fifth place	5th	6	1	2	3	5	10	Squad
(Chile) 1945	Withdrew								
(Argentina) 1946	Withdrew								
(Ecuador) 1947	Fifth place	5th	7	2	2	3	12	9	Squad
(Brazil) 1949	Third place	3rd	7	5	0	2	20	13	Squad
(Peru) 1953	Fifth place	5th	6	3	1	2	4	6	Squad
(Chile) 1955	Third place	3rd	5	2	2	1	13	11	Squad
(Uruguay) 1956	Sixth place	6th	5	0	1	4	6	11	Squad
(Peru) 1957	Fourth place	4th	6	4	0	2	12	9	Squad
(Argentina) 1959	Fourth place	4th	6	1	3	2	10	11	Squad
(Ecuador) 1959	Withdrew								
(Bolivia) 1963	Fifth place	5th	6	2	1	3	8	11	Squad
(Uruguay) 1967	Withdrew								
1975	Champions	1st	9	6	1	2	14	7	Squad
1979	Third place	3rd	2	0	1	1	1	2	Squad
1983	Third place	3rd	6	2	3	1	7	6	Squad
(Argentina) 1987	Group stage	6th	2	0	2	0	2	2	Squad
(Brazil) 1989	Group stage	8th	4	0	3	1	4	7	Squad
(Chile) 1991	Group stage	8th	4	1	0	3	9	9	Squad
(Ecuador) 1993	Quarter-finals	7th	4	1	2	1	4	5	Squad
(Uruguay) 1995	Group stage	10th	3	0	1	2	2	5	Squad
(Bolivia) 1997	Fourth place	4th	6	3	0	3	5	11	Squad
(Paraguay) 1999	Quarter-finals	7th	4	2	1	1	7	6	Squad
(Colombia) 2001	Quarter-finals	8th	4	1	1	2	4	8	Squad
(Peru) 2004	Quarter-finals	7th	4	1	2	1	7	6	Squad
(Venezuela) 2007	Quarter-finals	7th	4	1	1	2	5	8	Squad
(Argentina) 2011	Third place	3rd	6	3	1	2	8	5	Squad
(Chile) 2015	Third place	3rd	6	3	1	2	8	5	Squad
(United States) 2016	Quarter-finals	5th	4	2	2	0	4	2	Squad
(Brazil) 2019	Runners-up	2nd	6	2	2	2	7	9	Squad
(Brazil) 2021	Fourth place	4th	7	2	2	3	10	14	Squad
(United States) 2024	Group stage	13th	3	0	1	2	0	3	Squad
Total	2 Titles	34 / 48	164	58	40	66	229	256	—

=== CONCACAF Gold Cup ===
Peru competed in the CONCACAF Gold Cup's fifth edition in 2000. Peru participated, along with Colombia and South Korea, as that year's invitees. The Peruvian team's overall record in the tournament is 1 victory, 1 draw, and 2 losses.

Ysrael Zúñiga scored Peru's first goal in the competition on 14 February 2000, in a match against Haiti. Roberto Palacios, the team's top scorer with two goals in four matches, received a spot in that year's "team of the tournament", comprising the competition's eleven best players.

Peru progressed past the North American tournament's first stage, despite not winning any of its matches, as the second-best ranked team in Group B behind the United States. Peru next defeated Honduras 5–3 in a heated quarter-finals match that ended a minute early due to a pitch invasion by irate Honduran fans. Colombia defeated Peru 2–1 in the semi-finals, in a match that included an own goal from Peru's Marcial Salazar.

=== Olympic Games ===
Peru playing against Austria in the 1936 Olympic football tournament.

Peru's senior side has competed in the Olympic football tournament once, at the 1936 Summer Olympics in Berlin, Germany. The multiracial 1936 team has been described by historian David Goldblatt as "the jewel of the country's first Olympic delegation". It had a record of two victories, scoring 11 goals and conceding 5.

Teodoro Fernández scored Peru's first goal in the tournament in the match against Finland on 6 August, and finished as the team's top scorer with six goals in two games, including Peru's only hat-trick at the Olympics.

The 1935 South American Championship in Lima acted as the qualifying stage for the 1936 Olympic tournament. Uruguay won undefeated and Argentina came second, but neither took up their Olympic spot because of economic issues. Peru, who had come third, represented South America. The Peruvian team began the competition with a 7–3 win over Finland, after which it faced Austria, managed by Jimmy Hogan and popularly known as the Wunderteam, in the quarter-finals. (Note: Although an amateur side in 1936 with no players from their 1934 World Cup team, Austria's 1936 Olympic side is also considered part of the Wunderteam by sports historians and FIFA. This favours the idea that the Wunderteam was primarily a strategic creation of coaches Jimmy Hogan and Hugo Meisl.) After the game ended 2–2, Peru scored twice in extra time to win 4–2. Peru expected to then face Poland in the semi-finals, but events off the pitch led to the withdrawal of Peru's Olympic delegation before the match. (Note: Austria disputed the 4–2 result, asserting that Peruvian fans had invaded the pitch. While some spectators did encroach on the field of play, the authorities never confirmed their nationality. Moreover, the Peruvians had no responsibility over crowd control in the German stadium. A FIFA committee headed by Jules Rimet ordered a replay behind closed doors, prompting Peru's President Óscar R. Benavides to withdraw his entire Olympic delegation in protest.)

=== Bolivarian Games ===
Peru competed in and won the first Bolivarian Games in Colombia in 1938. During this tournament, Peru defeated all its opponents: 4–2 against Colombia, 3–0 against Bolivia, 2–1 against Venezuela, and most notably, 9–1 against Ecuador, which constitutes the largest victory in its history.

== Honours ==
=== Continental ===
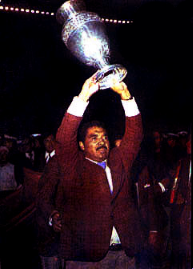
Marcos Calderón raises the Copa América trophy, which the Peru won in 1975.

- South American Championship / Copa América
  - (gold) Champions (2): 1939, 1975
  - (silver) Runners-up (1): 2019
  - (bronze) Third place (8): 1927, 1935, 1949, 1953, 1979, 1983, 2011, 2015

=== Regional ===
- Bolivarian Games
  - (gold) Gold medal (1): 1938 (Note: Only the 1st edition of the Bolivarian Games in 1938 was won by the A team. The other 4 editions (1947–48, 1961, 1973, 1981) were won by amateur teams.)

=== Friendly ===
- Copa del Pacífico (4): 1953, 1954, 1971^{s}, 1982
- Copa Mariscal Sucre (1): 1973^{s}
- Copa 75 Aniversario de la FPF (1): 1997
- Kirin Cup (3): 1999^{s}, 2005^{s}, 2011^{s}

=== Awards ===
- FIFA World Cup Fair Play Trophy (1): 1970
- Copa America Fair Play Award (1): 2015
- FIFA Fan Award (1): 2018

=== Summary ===
Competition	1st place, gold medalist(s)	2nd place, silver medalist(s)	3rd place, bronze medalist(s)	Total
CONMEBOL Copa América	2	1	8	11
Total	2	1	8	11

Notes

- ^{s} Shared titles.

== See also ==
- Peru national football team indiscipline scandals
- Peru women's national football team
- Peru Olympic football team
- Peru national under-20 football team
- Peru national under-17 football team
- Peru national beach soccer team
- Peru national futsal team
- Peruvian Primera División
- Sport in Peru

== Bibliography ==
- Agostino, Gilberto (2002). Vencer Ou Morrer: Futebol, Geopolítica e Identidade Nacional (in Portuguese). Rio de Janeiro: FAPERJ & MAUAD Editora Ltda. ISBN 85-7478-068-5.
- Aguirre, Carlos (2013). "<<Perú Campeón>>: Fiebre Futbolística y Nacionalismo en 1970". In Aguirre, Carlos; Panfichi, Aldo (eds.). Lima, Siglo XX: Cultura, Socialización y Cambio. Lima: Fondo Editorial de la Pontificia Universidad Católica del Perú. ISBN 978-612-4146-58-9.
- Basadre, Jorge (1964). Historia de la República del Perú (in Spanish). Vol. 10. Lima: Talleres Graficos P.L. Villanueva S.A.
- Bravo, Gonzalo (2012). "Association Football, Pacific Coast of South America". In Nauright, John; Parrish, Charles (eds.). Sports Around the World: History, Culture, and Practice. Vol. 3. Santa Barbara: ABC-Clio. ISBN 978-1-59884-301-9.
- Campomar, Andreas (2014). Golazo! The Beautiful Game from the Aztecs to the World Cup. New York City: Riverhead Books. ISBN 978-0-698-15253-3.
- Dunmore, Tom (2011). Historical Dictionary of Soccer. Plymouth: Scarecrow Press, Inc. ISBN 978-0-8108-7188-5.
- Fiore, Fernando (2012). ¡Vamos al Mundial! (in Spanish). New York: HarperCollins. ISBN 978-0-06-222664-8.
- Foley Gambetta, Enrique (1983). Léxico del Peru (in Spanish). Vol. 3. Lima: Talleres Jahnos.
- Goldblatt, David (2008). The Ball is Round. New York: Riverhead Trade. ISBN 978-1-59448-296-0.
- Handelsman, Michael (2000). Culture and Customs of Ecuador. Westport: Greenwood Press. ISBN 0-313-30244-8.
- Henshaw, Richard (1979). The Encyclopedia of World Soccer. Washington, D.C.: New Republic Books. ISBN 0-915220-34-2.
- Higgins, James (2005). Lima: A Cultural and Literary History. Oxford: Signal Books Limited. ISBN 1-902669-98-3.
- Jacobsen, Nils (2008). "Peru". In Herb, Guntram; Kaplan, David (eds.). Nations and Nationalism: A Global Historical Overview. Vol. 1. Santa Barbara: ABC-Clio. ISBN 978-1-85109-907-8.
- Leigh Raffo, Denise (2005). "El miedo a la multitud. Dos provincianos en el Estadio Nacional, 1950–1970". In Rosas Lauro, Claudia (ed.). El Miedo en el Perú: Siglos XVI al XX (in Spanish). Lima: PUCP Fondo Editorial. ISBN 9972-42-690-4.
- Llopis, Ramón (2009). Fútbol Postnacional: Transformaciones Sociales y Culturales del "Deporte Global" en Europa y América Latina (in Spanish). Barcelona: Anthropos Editorial. ISBN 978-84-7658-937-3.
- Mandell, Richard (1987). The Nazi Olympics. Champaign: University of Illinois Press. ISBN 0-252-01325-5.
- Miró, César (1958). Los Intimos de La Victoria (in Spanish). Lima: Editorial El Deporte.
- Murray, William (1994). Football: A History of the World Game. Aldershot: Scolar Press. ISBN 1-85928-091-9.
- Panfichi, Aldo; Vich, Victor (2005). "Political and Social Fantasies in Peruvian Football: The Tragedy of Alianza Lima in 1987". In Darby, Paul; Johnes, Martin; Mellor, Gavin (eds.). Soccer and Disaster: International Perspectives. New York: Routledge. ISBN 0-7146-5352-7.
- Radnedge, Keir (2001). The Illustrated Encyclopedia of Soccer. New York: Universe Publishing. ISBN 978-0-7893-0670-8.
- Snyder, John (2001). Soccer's Most Wanted. Washington, D.C.: Potomac Books, Inc. ISBN 978-1-57488-365-7.
- Stein, Steve (2011). "The Case of Soccer in Early Twentieth-Century Lima". In Stavans, Ilan (ed.). Fútbol. Santa Barbara: ABC-CLIO, LLC. ISBN 978-0-313-37515-6.
- Thorndike, Guillermo (1978). El Revés de Morir (in Spanish). Lima: Mosca Azul Editores.
- Witzig, Richard (2006). The Global Art of Soccer. Harahan: CusiBoy Publishing. ISBN 0-9776688-0-0.
- Wood, David (2007). "¡Arriba Perú! The Role of Football in the Formation of a Peruvian National Culture". In Miller, Rory; Crolley, Liz (eds.). Football in the Americas. London: Institute for the Study of the Americas. ISBN 978-1-900039-80-2.
- Soccer: The Ultimate Guide. New York: DK Publishing. 2010. ISBN 978-0-7566-7321-5.
- Essential Soccer Skills. New York: DK Publishing. 2011. ISBN 978-0-7566-5902-8.

== Notes and references ==
=== References ===
Achievements
Preceded by Inaugural Champions	Bolivarian Champions; 1938 (First title)	Succeeded by 1947–48 Peru amateur
Preceded by 1937 Argentina	South American Champions; 1939 (First title)	Succeeded by 1941 Argentina
Preceded by 1967 Uruguay	South American Champions; 1975 (Second title)	Succeeded by 1979 Paraguay
Preceded by 1998 Japan	Kirin Cup Champions; 1999 (First title, shared)	Succeeded by 2000 Slovakia
Preceded by 2004 Japan	Kirin Cup Champions; 2005 (Second title, shared)	Succeeded by 2006 Scotland
Preceded by 2009 Japan	Kirin Cup Champions; 2011 (Third title, shared)	Succeeded by 2016 Bosnia and Herzegovina
