= Handelsman =

Handelsman is an occupational surname of Swedish origin. The word literally means "merchant" in Swedish. Notable people with the surname include:

- David Handelsman, Australian medical doctor and university professor
- Harry Handelsman (born 1949), British property developer
- J. B. Handelsman (1922–2007), American cartoonist and illustrator
- Jo Handelsman, American professor of molecular, cellular and developmental biology at Yale University
- Marceli Handelsman (1882–1945), Polish historian
- Mark Handelsman (born 1961), South African-born Israeli Olympic middle distance runner
- Michael Handelsman, American historian
- Steve Handelsman (born 1948), American journalist
- Walt Handelsman (born 1956), American cartoonist
