= List of international goals scored by Paolo Guerrero =

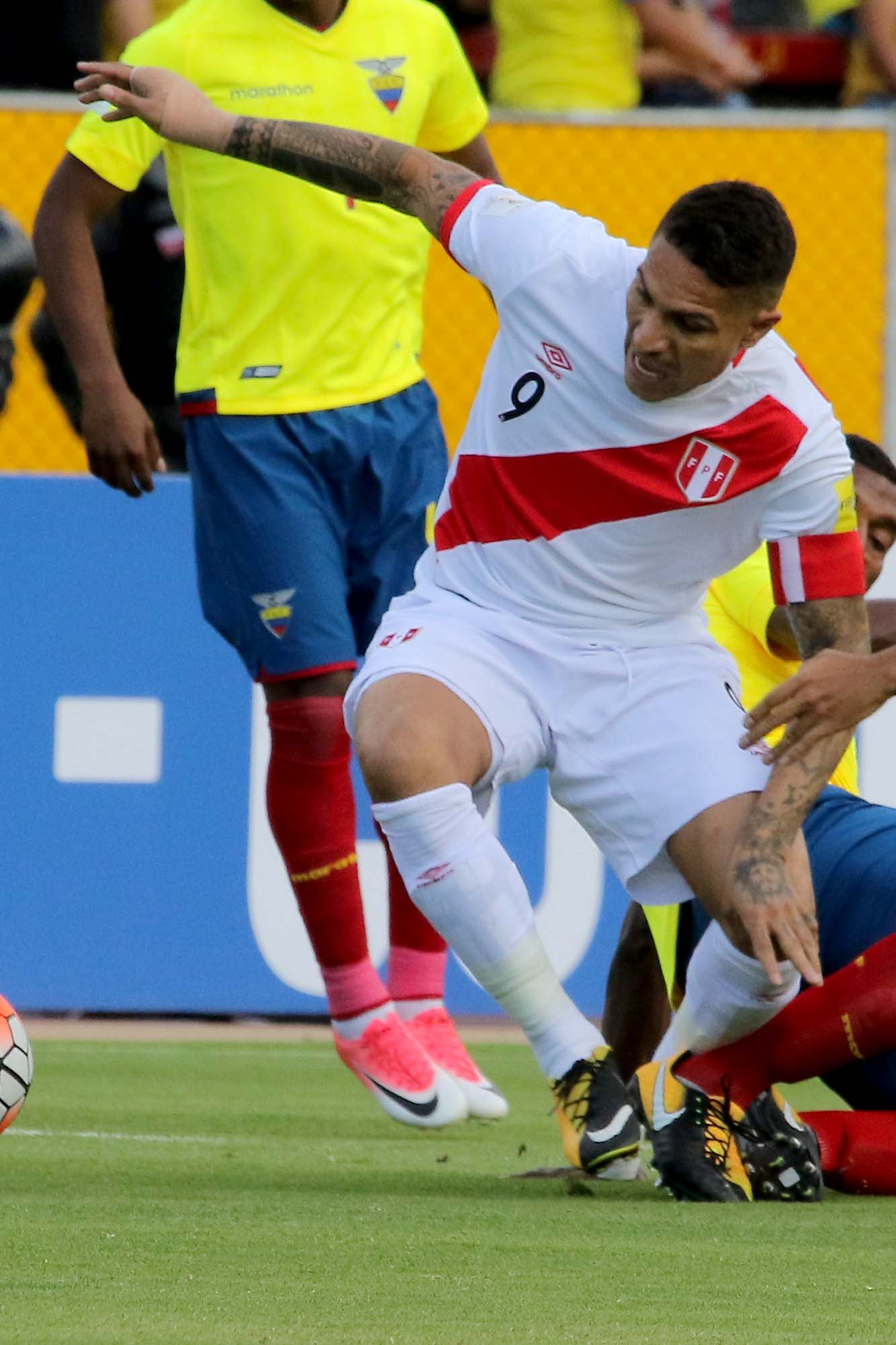
Guerrero playing for Peru against Ecuador in 2017.

Paolo Guerrero is the all-time top goalscorer for the Peru national football team. As of 10 June 2025, he has scored 40 goals in 128 appearances, since his debut on 9 October 2004.

Guerrero became the all-time leading goalscorer for Peru on 4 June 2016, after scoring against Haiti in a 1–0 win at the Copa América Centenario.

== International goals ==
As of 20 March 2025.

List of international goals scored by Paolo Guerrero
No.	Date	Venue	Opponent	Score	Result	Competition
1.	17 November 2004	Estadio Nacional, Lima, Peru	Chile	2–0	2–1	2006 FIFA World Cup qualification
2.	30 March 2005	Estadio Nacional, Lima, Peru	Ecuador	1–0	2–2	2006 FIFA World Cup qualification
3.	17 August 2005	Estadio Jorge Basadre, Tacna, Peru	Chile	2–1	3–1	Friendly
4.	6 September 2006	Giants Stadium, East Rutherford, United States	Ecuador	1–1	1–1	Friendly
5.	7 October 2006	Estadio Sausalito, Viña del Mar, Chile	Chile	1–0	2–3	Friendly
6.	26 June 2007	Estadio Metropolitano de Mérida, Mérida, Venezuela	Uruguay	3–0	3–0	2007 Copa América
7.	8 September 2007	Estadio Monumental "U", Lima, Peru	Colombia	1–1	2–2	Friendly
8.	8 September 2007	Estadio Monumental "U", Lima, Peru	Colombia	2–2	2–2	Friendly
9.	12 September 2007	Estadio Monumental "U", Lima, Peru	Bolivia	2–0	2–0	Friendly
10.	4 July 2011	Estadio San Juan del Bicentenario, San Juan, Argentina	Uruguay	1–0	1–1	2011 Copa América
11.	8 July 2011	Estadio Malvinas Argentinas, Mendoza, Argentina	Mexico	1–0	1–0	2011 Copa América
12.	23 July 2011	Estadio Ciudad de La Plata, La Plata, Argentina	Venezuela	2–0	4–1	2011 Copa América
13.	23 July 2011	Estadio Ciudad de La Plata, La Plata, Argentina	Venezuela	3–1	4–1	2011 Copa América
14.	23 July 2011	Estadio Ciudad de La Plata, La Plata, Argentina	Venezuela	4–1	4–1	2011 Copa América
15.	7 October 2011	Estadio Nacional, Lima, Peru	Paraguay	1–0	2–0	2014 FIFA World Cup qualification
16.	7 October 2011	Estadio Nacional, Lima, Peru	Paraguay	2–0	2–0	2014 FIFA World Cup qualification
17.	23 May 2012	Estadio Nacional, Lima, Peru	Nigeria	1–0	1–0	Friendly
18.	10 June 2012	Estadio Centenario, Montevideo, Uruguay	Uruguay	2–2	2–4	2014 FIFA World Cup qualification
19.	9 September 2014	Abdullah bin Khalifa Stadium, Doha, Qatar	Qatar	2–0	2–0	Friendly
20.	14 November 2014	Estadio Feliciano Cáceres, Luque, Paraguay	Paraguay	1–1	1–2	Friendly
21.	25 June 2015	Estadio Municipal Germán Becker, Temuco, Chile	Bolivia	1–0	3–1	2015 Copa América
22.	25 June 2015	Estadio Municipal Germán Becker, Temuco, Chile	Bolivia	2–0	3–1	2015 Copa América
23.	25 June 2015	Estadio Municipal Germán Becker, Temuco, Chile	Bolivia	3–0	3–1	2015 Copa América
24.	3 July 2015	Estadio Municipal de Concepción, Concepción, Chile	Paraguay	2–0	2–0	2015 Copa América
25.	13 October 2015	Estadio Nacional, Lima, Peru	Chile	3–4	3–4	2018 FIFA World Cup qualification
26.	25 March 2016	Estadio Nacional, Lima, Peru	Venezuela	1–2	2–2	2018 FIFA World Cup qualification
27.	4 June 2016	CenturyLink Field, Seattle, United States	Haiti	1–0	1–0	Copa América Centenario
28.	6 October 2016	Estadio Nacional, Lima, Peru	Argentina	1–1	2–2	2018 FIFA World Cup qualification
29.	23 March 2017	Estadio Monumental de Maturín, Maturín, Venezuela	Venezuela	2–2	2–2	2018 FIFA World Cup qualification
30.	28 March 2017	Estadio Nacional, Lima, Peru	Uruguay	1–1	2–1	2018 FIFA World Cup qualification
31.	8 June 2017	Estadio Mansiche, Trujillo, Peru	Paraguay	1–0	1–0	Friendly
32.	13 June 2017	Estadio Monumental de la UNSA, Arequipa, Peru	Jamaica	3–0	3–1	Friendly
33.	3 June 2018	Kybunpark, St. Gallen, Switzerland	Saudi Arabia	2–0	3–0	Friendly
34.	3 June 2018	Kybunpark, St. Gallen, Switzerland	Saudi Arabia	3–0	3–0	Friendly
35.	26 June 2018	Fisht Olympic Stadium, Sochi, Russia	Australia	2–0	2–0	2018 FIFA World Cup
36.	18 June 2019	Estádio do Maracanã, Rio de Janeiro, Brazil	Bolivia	1–1	3–1	2019 Copa América
37.	3 July 2019	Arena do Grêmio, Porto Alegre, Brazil	Chile	3–0	3–0	2019 Copa América
38.	7 July 2019	Estádio do Maracanã, Rio de Janeiro, Brazil	Brazil	1–1	1–3	2019 Copa América final
39.	26 March 2024	Estadio Monumental "U", Lima, Peru	Dominican Republic	4–1	4–1	Friendly
40.	20 March 2025	Estadio Nacional, Lima, Peru	Bolivia	2–0	3–1	2026 FIFA World Cup qualification

_{Note 1: Peru's 1–0 friendly win against Senegal on 28 June 2011, in which Guerrero scored the only goal, is not considered a full A-international match by FIFA, and is thus not included in the list above.}

_{Note 2: In a World Cup qualifier on 10 October 2017 where Peru drew with Colombia 1–1, FIFA's match summary lists Peru's goal as an own goal by David Ospina. CONMEBOL and other sources have had match reports that gave the goal to Guerrero. The goal was a result of an indirect free kick that Guerrero struck on target, and therefore required a touch from Ospina in order to stand. Additionally, FIFA's match report has officially given the goal as an own goal; thus, it is not included in the list above.}

== Statistics ==
As of match played 10 June 2025

Appearances and goals by national team and year
National team	Year	Apps	Goals
Peru	2004	3	1
Peru	2005	6	2
Peru	2006	3	2
Peru	2007	9	4
Peru	2008	4	0
Peru	2009	3	0
Peru	2010	0	0
Peru	2011	9	7
Peru	2012	8	2
Peru	2013	6	0
Peru	2014	5	2
Peru	2015	11	5
Peru	2016	12	3
Peru	2017	7	4
Peru	2018	5	3
Peru	2019	11	3
Peru	2020	0	0
Peru	2021	5	0
Peru	2022	0	0
Peru	2023	8	0
Peru	2024	9	1
Peru	2025	4	1
Total		128	40
