= Rodillo Negro =

Golden generation of football players from Peru

The Rodillo Negro (Black roller) is the name given to a golden generation of football players from Peru who represented Alianza Lima and the Peru national football team at domestic and international events. The period associated with this generation lasts throughout the 1930s up to the early 1940s. From a narrow view, the Rodillo Negro solely identifies Alianza Lima's forward line; from a broad perspective, the sobriquet applies to the whole squad and the players which reinforced it in the Peru national football team.

== History ==
=== ¡Vamos Boys! ===
The starting eleven of Sport Boys were called up to the national team.

=== Berlin Olympics ===
Despite not earning a medal at the Olympic games, the players were awarded medals with the inscription "A los futbolistas peruanos campeones olympicos 1936" (in English: "To the Peruvian Football Players, 1936 Olympic Champions").

=== Bolivarian champions ===
Peru won the 1938 Bolivarian Games.

== See also ==
- Sport in Peru
- Football in Peru
- Breslau Eleven
- Golden Team
- Nazio-Juve
- Os Magriços
- Wembley Wizards

== Bibliography ==
- Basadre, Jorge (1964). Historia de la República del Perú (in Spanish). Vol. 10. Lima: Talleres Graficos P.L. Villanueva S.A.
- Miró, César (1958). Los Intimos de La Victoria (in Spanish). Lima: Editorial El Deporte.
- Witzig, Richard (2006). The Global Art of Soccer. Harahan: CusiBoy Publishing. ISBN 0-9776688-0-0.
