= Peru national football team indiscipline scandals =

Since the 1990s, members of the Peru national football team have been involved in several disciplinary controversies.

== Miramar scandal (1996) ==
In 1996, during the 1998 FIFA World Cup qualification season, players Nolberto Solano, Roberto Farfán, Percy Olivares, and Juan Marengo were reported to have been drinking beer and playing music while the team was preparing for a qualifier match against Uruguay. The football players were found along with volleyball players Jéssica Tejada and Yolanda Delgado. Peru failed to qualify for the 1998 World Cup.

== La Charanga Habanera scandal (2002) ==
In 2002, during the 2002 FIFA World Cup qualifiers, a Salsa performed at the team’s training complex, where alcohol was reportedly consumed. Additionally, women were found to have entered the concentration zone. Peru did not qualify for the 2002 World Cup.

== Hotel Golf Los Incas scandal (2007) ==
During the 2010 FIFA World Cup qualification season, a disciplinary controversy arose involving several national team players as Peruvian journalists Jaime Bayly and Magaly Medina revealed that a series of Peru's most recognized players, including Claudio Pizarro, Andrés Mendoza, Santiago Acasiete, Paolo Guerrero, and Jefferson Farfán, were reported by local media to have visited nightclubs and parties shortly before qualifying matches. Several players were banned from playing for the national team while others were put under investigation.

The national press named the scandal in reference to the hotel in which the players were concentrating prior to the match. Banned players such as Pizarro and Farfán ended up with successful 2009 seasons while the national team finished at the bottom of the South American qualifiers for the 2010 World Cup.

== Panama Casino scandal (2010) ==
On October 12, 2010, following a friendly game against Panama, journalists from the Central American country revealed photos in which three Peru national football team players were photographed at a casino while the team was in official concentration. Two of the players were identified as the young midfielder Reimond Manco and the veteran defender John Galliquio. The identity of the third player was kept a mystery until local Peruvian sports newspaper El Bocón revealed it had been famous forward Jefferson Farfán. The player was accused by Manco and Galliquio of inciting the group of three to leave the concentration, despite the orders of Uruguayan coach Sergio Markarián to stay in their rooms for the remainder of their stay in Panama.

== La Videna Disco scandal (2019) ==
On 31 December 2019, a disciplinary issue arose involving players of the Peru national and Olympic teams when young star Kevin Quevedo was caught to have attended in La Videna disco party in Lima, and didn't come to train with remaining members of the Peru Olympic football team preparing for the 2020 CONMEBOL Pre-Olympic Tournament. While Quevedo was yet to be a member of senior squad, reports alleged that three senior-team players were present or involved in the incident: Andy Polo, Jefferson Farfán and Raúl Ruidíaz. As for the result, Kevin Quevedo was suspended from the Olympic team by the FPF while the Peru Olympic team finished bottom of its group and did not qualify for the 2020 Summer Olympics.
