= Copa América trophy =

South American football trophy

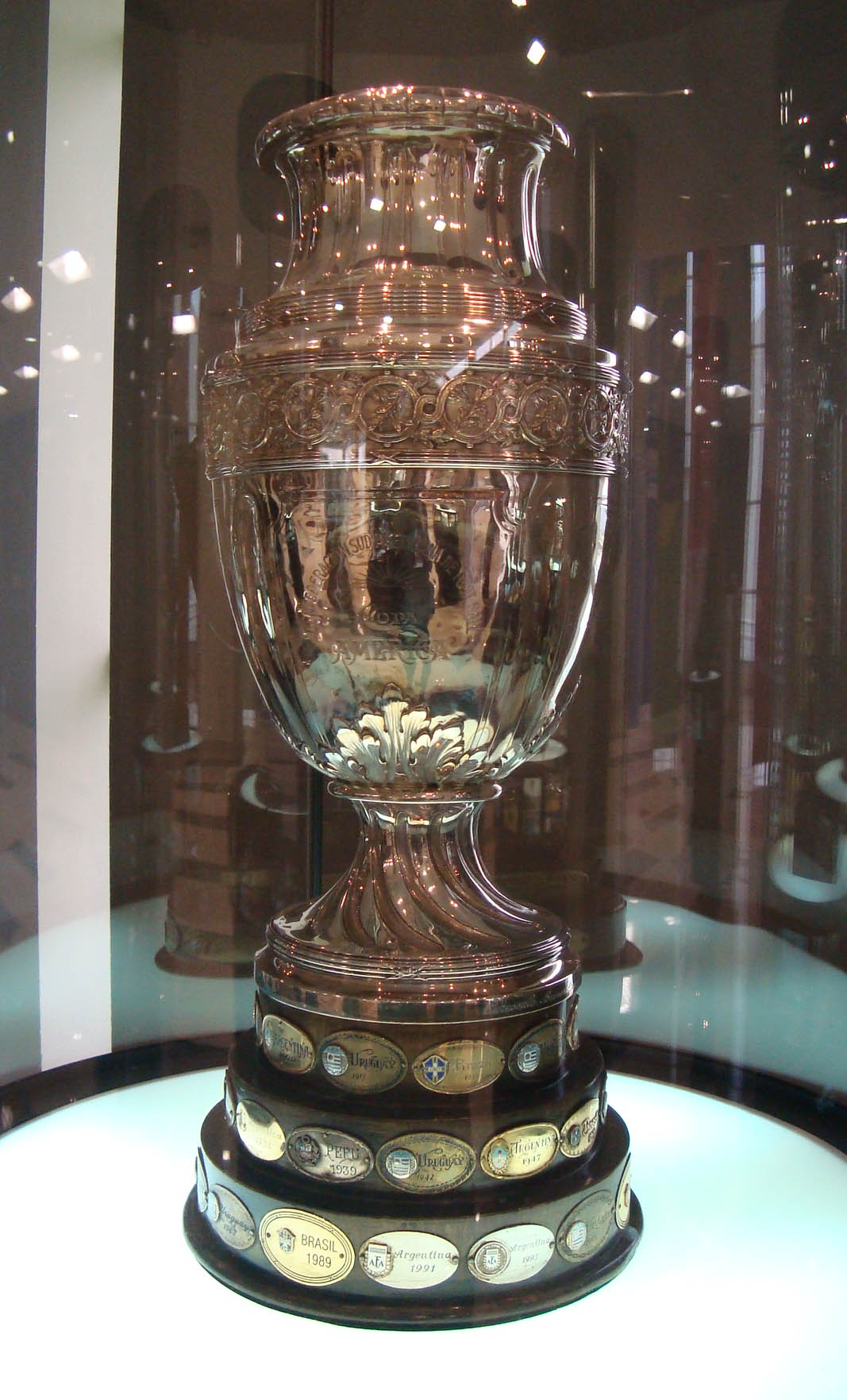
- The Copa América trophy at the CONMEBOL Museum in Luque, Paraguay.
- Awarded for: Winning the Copa América
- Presented by: CONMEBOL

History
- First award: 1916
- First winner: Uruguay
- Most wins: Argentina (16 times)
- Most recent: Argentina (16th title, 2024)

The Copa América trophy is the trophy awarded to the winning national team of Copa América, the top men's quadrennial football tournament contested among national teams from South America. The Copa América trophy is one of the oldest sports awards in the world in force.

== History ==
The trophy was made between 1916 and 1917 at Casa Escasany, a jewelry store in Buenos Aires, for a price of 3,000 Swiss francs at the time, and was donated to the South American Football Confederation by the Ministry of Foreign Affairs, International Trade and Worship of Argentina. From its creation to the present, the champion of each competition has the right to keep the original trophy temporarily until the new Copa América draw, where it must be returned to CONMEBOL. After returning it, the champion will receive a replica of it, which he will have the right to keep permanently.

In the 1990s, the Chilean company Milled began to make the prizes for South American continental tournaments at the club and national team level, located in the Pedro Aguirre Cerda commune in the city of Santiago. Nicolás Leoz, the president of CONMEBOL, during a brief stay asked a taxi driver if he knew of any place to buy medals for a championship that was being held. Coincidentally, his wife worked there, met him, approved and signed the contract with the owner.

The award was given without variations until the 2001 edition. Since then, replicas have been awarded. However, from 2024 the winning team takes the original trophy and keeps it until the next draw for the future championship. At the time of return to Conmebol, a replica will be received to preserve it.

== Characteristics ==
The cup measures 75 cm high, and has a diameter of 30 cm, is fixed to a wooden base and weighs about 9 kilos. It is a unique piece of goldsmithing made of silver. Since 2011, the wooden support has four rings of different diameters containing small gold plates that bear the year of the winning national team.

== Centenario trophy ==
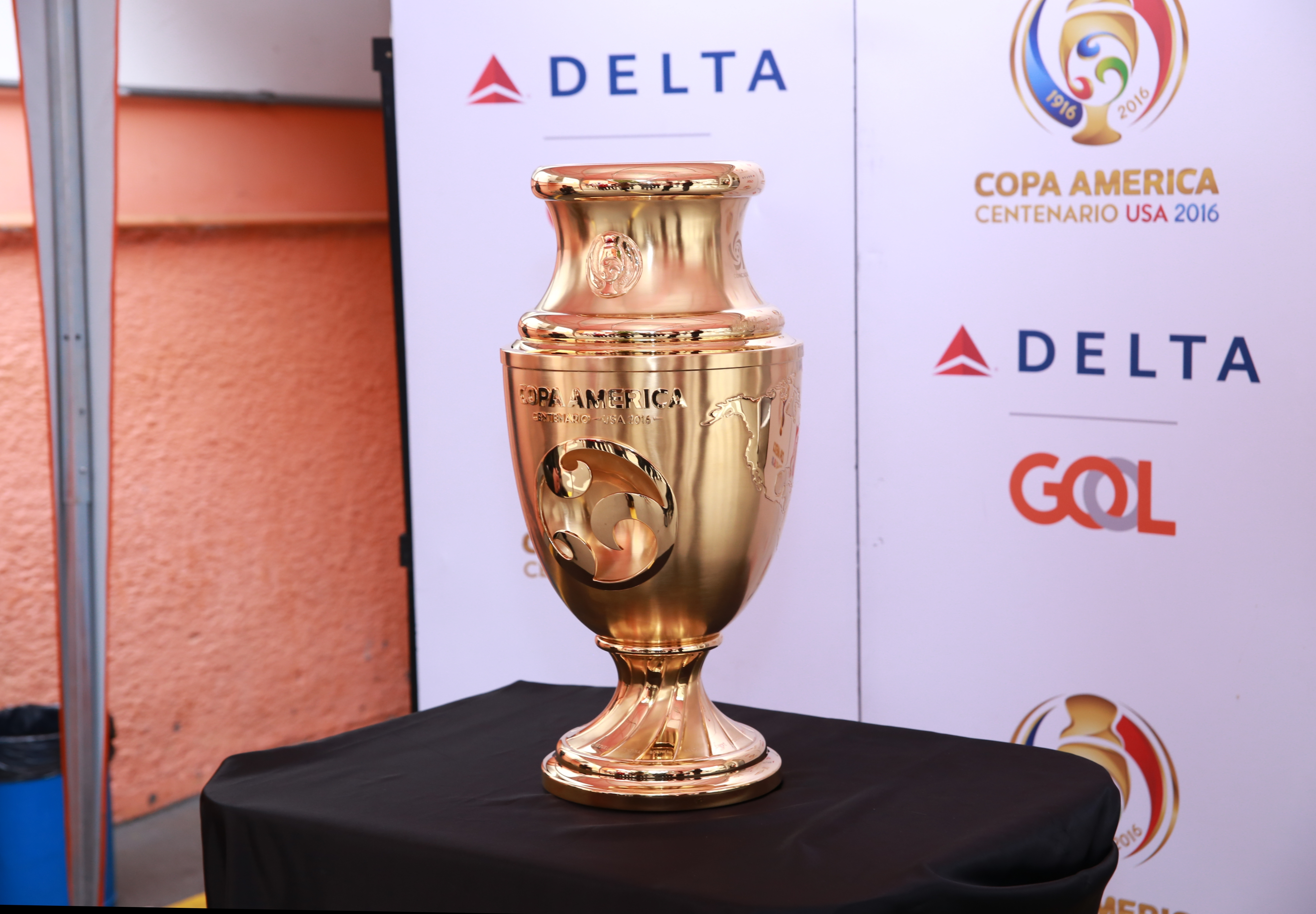
Special trophy for the champion of the Copa América Centenario.

On 28 April 2016, the commemorative trophy was presented for the first time at the sports headquarters of the Colombian Football Federation in Bogotá. It was delivered by CONMEBOL to the Chile football team, champion of the Copa América Centenario, which was played between 3 and 26 June in ten cities in the United States.

The trophy uses the silhouette of the original cup as inspiration, but includes a new vision: it has gold curves on the Greek urn, to represent 100 years of soccer on the American continent. It is 61cm tall and weighs 7.1kg, and is covered in shiny satin 24K gold to demonstrate the importance of the 100th anniversary. In addition, it has an engraved continental map of America and the emblems of CONMEBOL and CONCACAF. The interior of the new trophy is silver in homage to the original and its hundred-year legacy. Finally, the base shows the names of the 16 participating countries in an ascending spiral format.

The design was made by the firm «Epico Studios», in the United States, and created by «London Workshops of Thomas Lyte», in England. It took 89 days and another 98 to materialize the work. The Chilean team won the trophy permanently, given the condition of being an extraordinary and commemorative tournament, and its name was also engraved for the second consecutive time on the traditional trophy, remaining registered in the official list of Copa América winners.

== See also ==
- Copa Libertadores (trophy)
- Copa Sudamericana (trophy)
