= Piero Magallanes =

Peruvian footballer (born 2001)

Personal information
- Full name: Piero Alessandro Magallanes Broggi
- Date of birth: 3 April 2001 (age 25)
- Place of birth: Lima, Peru
- Height: 1.80 m (5 ft 11 in)
- Position: Right winger

Team information
- Current team: Sport Huancayo
- Number: 23

Youth career
- Universitario

Senior career*
Years	Team	Apps	(Gls)
2021	Deportivo Coopsol	14	(2)
2022	Unión Huaral	18	(1)
2023–2024	Comerciantes Unidos	59	(11)
2025–	Sport Huancayo	58	(10)

International career^{‡}
2025–	Peru	6	(1)
- * Club domestic league appearances and goals ‡ National team caps and goals as of 14 November 2026

Piero Alessandro Magallanes Broggi (born 3 April 2001) is a Peruvian professional footballer who plays as a right winger for Peruvian Liga 1 club Sport Huancayo and the Peru national team.

He is the son of Alex Magallanes, a Peruvian footballer from the 1990s and 2000s.

== Club career ==
Having come up through the ranks at Universitario de Deportes—where he played alongside the likes of Piero Quispe—Piero Magallanes was forced to move to the second division due to a lack of playing time. He went on to play for Deportivo Coopsol (2021) and Unión Huaral (2022), before joining Comerciantes Unidos, with whom he won the second-division championship in 2023.

He joins Sport Huancayo in 2025.

== International career ==
Called up to the Peru national team on December 21, 2025, to face Bolivia—a match in which he scored the opening goal in a 2–0 victory—Magallanes has earned six caps for his country.

== Honours ==
Comerciantes Unidos

- Peruvian Segunda División: 2023
