= Maxloren Castro =

Peruvian footballer (born 2007)

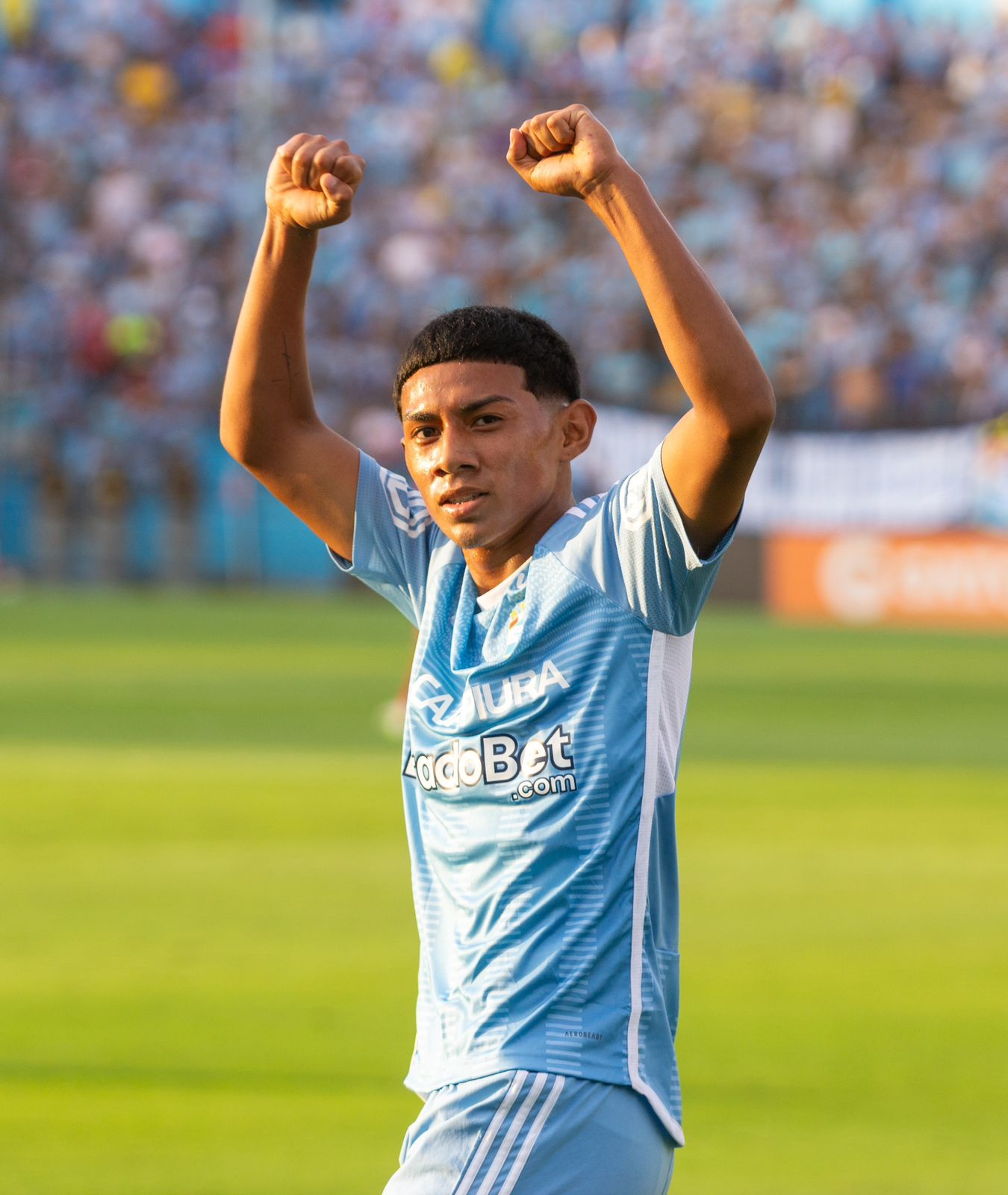
- Castro with Sporting Cristal in 2024

Personal information
- Full name: Maxloren Sannoe Castro Rufino
- Date of birth: 8 December 2007 (age 18)
- Place of birth: Callao, Peru
- Height: 1.68 m (5 ft 6 in)
- Position: Winger

Team information
- Current team: Sporting Cristal
- Number: 23

Youth career
- Tiwinza Los Potrillos
- 2018–2023: Sporting Cristal

Senior career*
Years	Team	Apps	(Gls)
2024–	Sporting Cristal	66	(6)

International career^{‡}
2024–	Peru U20	6	(0)
2025–	Peru	5	(1)
- * Club domestic league appearances and goals as of 23:14, 31 May 2026 (UTC) ‡ National team caps and goals as of 20:03, 14 November 2026 (UTC)

Maxloren Sannoe Castro Rufino (born 8 December 2007) is a Peruvian footballer who plays as a winger for Peruvian Primera División club Sporting Cristal and the Peru national team.

He joined Sporting Cristal at age 10, and made his debut and scored his first goal at 16. He was first called up to the Peru national team when he was 16, and made his debut a year later.

== Early life ==
Born on 8 December 2007 in Callao, Castro grew up in the neighbourhood of A.H. Acapulco. He started playing football at the local club academy FC Tiwinza Los Potrillos at the age of four, before moving to Sporting Cristal when he was 10. Initially a full-back, he was converted into a winger due to his attacking ability.

Castro was a new player on the under-13 team in 2020 when football was cancelled due to the COVID-19 pandemic, and made the move to under-15 football when it resumed in 2022. The following year, he was invited into the under-17 and under-18 teams, consolidating his place in the latter by the end of the year and being named in the first team by manager Enderson Moreira.

== Club career ==
Castro signed his first professional contract in January 2024, shortly after turning 16, tying him to the club until the end of 2026. He made his debut in the Peruvian Primera División on 15 February in a 4–1 home win over newly promoted Los Chankas.

In the next game on 24 February 2024 away to Carlos A. Mannucci, Castro scored his first goal to open a 4–0 win; Santiago González sent in a cross and Castro fell to the floor under the challenge of opponent Emilio Saba, deflecting the ball into the goal off his back, and was unable to stand up to celebrate with his teammates. He was the first 16-year-old to score for Sporting Cristal in the 21st century, and the youngest in the entire league since Luis Antonio Escobar for Alianza Lima in 1984. Three days later he played his first Copa Libertadores game in a 3–1 win at home to Always Ready of Bolivia, with his team being eliminated after losing the first leg 6–1. On 15 October 2024, he was named by English newspaper The Guardian as one of the best players born in 2007 worldwide.

== International career ==
Castro was called up for the Peru national under-20 football team in June 2024 for two friendly matches against Colombia.

In September 2024, still aged 16, Castro was called up for the senior national team for 2026 FIFA World Cup qualifiers against neighbours Colombia and Ecuador. Manager Jorge Fossati chose him after Franco Zanelatto withdrew with ear problems.

On 10 October 2025, 17-year-old Castro made his senior international debut, under interim manager Manuel Barreto. He came on as a half-time substitute for Kenji Cabrera in a 2–1 friendly loss away to Chile, as one of four Peruvian debutants. On 13 November 2026, he scored his first international goal to seal a 2–0 friendly win at home to neighbours Bolivia.

== Career statistics ==
=== Club ===
As of 31 May 2026.

Club	Season	League			Cup		Continental		Other		Total	
Club	Season	Division	Apps	Goals	Apps	Goals	Apps	Goals	Apps	Goals	Apps	Goals
Sporting Cristal	2024	Liga 1	21	2	0	0	1 (Note: Appearance in Copa Libertadores)	0	—		22	2
Sporting Cristal	2025	Liga 1	29	1	0	0	5	0	—		34	1
Sporting Cristal	2026	Liga 1	16	3	0	0	9	1	—		25	4
Sporting Cristal	Total		66	6	0	0	15	1	0	0	81	7
Career total			66	6	0	0	15	1	0	0	81	7

=== International ===
As of match played on 13 November 2026

Appearances and goals by national team and year
National team	Year	Apps	Goals
Peru	2025	2	0
Peru	2026	3	1
Total		5	1

List of international goals scored by Maxloren Castro
No.	Date	Venue	Opponent	Score	Result	Competition
1	13 November 2026	Estadio Alejandro Villanueva, Lima, Peru	Bolivia	2–0	2–0	Friendly
