= Jairo Vélez =

Ecuadorian-Peruvian footballer (born 1995)

Personal information
- Full name: Jairo David Vélez Cedeño
- Date of birth: 21 April 1995 (age 31)
- Place of birth: El Carmen, Ecuador
- Height: 1.76 m (5 ft 9 in)
- Position: Attacking midfielder

Team information
- Current team: Alianza Lima
- Number: 20

Youth career
- 2008–2010: Universidad Católica
- 2010–2013: River Plate Ecuador
- 2013–2014: Vélez Sársfield

Senior career*
Years	Team	Apps	(Gls)
2013	River Plate Ecuador	12	(2)
2013–2014	→ Vélez Sársfield (loan)	1	(1)
2014–2018	Vélez Sársfield	2	(0)
2015–2016	→ Universidad Católica (loan)	4	(0)
2017	→ Universidad San Martín (loan)	41	(7)
2018–2019	Atlante	37	(5)
2019	Cafetaleros	12	(2)
2020–2024	César Vallejo	137	(32)
2025	Universitario de Deportes	29	(3)
2026–	Alianza Lima	26	(4)

International career^{‡}
2014	Ecuador U20	4	(0)
2026–	Peru	8	(5)
- * Club domestic league appearances and goals as of 18 September 2026 ‡ National team caps and goals as of 6 October 2026

Jairo David Vélez Cedeño (born 21 April 1995) is a professional footballer who plays as a midfielder for Peruvian Liga 1 club Alianza Lima. Born in Ecuador, he represents the Peru national team.

== Club career ==
Vélez climbed through the youth ranks of Universidad Católica, later moving to River Plate Ecuador in 2010, where he debuted in the first team in 2013, scoring twice in the Ecuadorian Serie B. He was then scouted by Vélez Sarsfield along his teammate Danny Cabezas while playing friendly matches for River Plate Ecuador in Argentina.

The striker was first loaned and placed on the club's "5th Division" youth team, scoring 10 goals which helped the youth team win the 5th Division league in 2013. Vélez was then moved to the reserves in the same year and was brought up to the senior team for 2014 under manager Turu Flores, while still on loan. The Ecuadorian made his professional debut for Vélez Sársfield on 27 April, also scoring his first goal for the club in a 4–1 win against Rosario Central. On 15 July 2014, Vélez signed a new three-year contract. Halfway through 2015, he moved to Universidad Católica on loan, where he achieved qualification to the 2016 Copa Sudamericana.

== International career ==
In 2015, Vélez was selected to play for the Ecuador national under-20 football team in the South American Youth Championship.

On 29 January 2026, Vélez's request to switch international allegiance to Peru was approved by FIFA.

== Career statistics ==
=== Club ===
As of 18 September 2026

Appearances and goals by club, season and competition
Club	Season	League			National cup (Note: Includes Copa MX)		League Cup		Continental		Total	
Club	Season	Division	Apps	Goals	Apps	Goals	Apps	Goals	Apps	Goals!Apps	Goals	
River Plate Ecuador	2012	Ecuadorian Serie B	2	0	—		—		—		2	0
River Plate Ecuador	2013	Ecuadorian Serie B	5	2	—		—		5	2		
River Plate Ecuador	Total		7	2	0	0	—		0	0	7	2
Vélez Sársfield	2013–14	AFA Liga Profesional de Fútbol	1	1	0	0	—		—		1	1
Vélez Sársfield	2014	AFA Liga Profesional de Fútbol	1	0	0	—		0	0	0	1	0
Vélez Sársfield	2016	AFA Liga Profesional de Fútbol	0	0	0	0	—		—		0	0
Vélez Sársfield	Total		2	1	0	0	—		0	0	2	1
Universidad Católica	2015	LigaPro Serie A	4	0	—		—		0	0	4	0
Universidad San Martín	2017	Liga 1	41	7	—		—		—		41	7
Atlante	2017–18	Liga MX	7	0	—		—		—		7	0
Atlante	2018–19	Liga MX	30	5	2	0	—		—		32	5
Atlante	Total		37	5	2	0	—		0	0	39	5
Cafetaleros	2019–20	Liga MX	12	2	4	1	—		—		16	3
César Vallejo	2020	Liga 1	23	5	—		—		—		23	5
César Vallejo	2021	Liga 1	20	5	0	0	—		1 (Note: Appearance in Copa Libertadores)	0	21	5
César Vallejo	2022	Liga 1	30	9	—		—		1	0	31	9
César Vallejo	2023	Liga 1	33	3	—		—		6 (Note: Appearance in Copa Sudamericana)	2	39	5
César Vallejo	2024	Liga 1	31	10	—		—		6	3	37	13
César Vallejo	Total		137	32	0	0	—		14	5	151	37
Universitario de Deportes	2025	Liga 1	29	3	0	0	—		8	0	37	3
Alianza Lima	2026	Liga 1	26	4	0	0	2	0	2	0	30	4
Career total			295	56	6	1	2	0	24	5	327	62

=== International ===
As of match played 6 October 2026

Appearances and goals by national team and year
National team	Year	Apps	Goals
Peru	2026	8	5
Total		8	5

Scores and results list Peru's goal tally first.

No.	Date	Venue	Opponent	Score	Result	Competition
1.	31 March 2026	Estadio Ontime Butarque, Leganés, Spain	Honduras	1–0	2–2	Friendly
2.	31 March 2026	Estadio Ontime Butarque, Leganés, Spain	Honduras	2–1	2–2	Friendly
3.	5 June 2026	Nu Stadium, Miami, United States	Haiti	2–1	2–1	Friendly
4.	8 June 2026	Estadio Cuauhtémoc, Puebla, Mexico	Spain	1–3	1–3	Friendly
5.	29 September 2026	Sports Illustrated Stadium, Harrison, United States	Mexico	1–0	1–1	Friendly

== Honours ==
Vélez Sarsfield

- Supercopa Argentina: 2013

Universitario de Deportes

- Peruvian Primera División: 2025
