= SAFAP =

Union for association football players

Agremiación de Futbolistas Profesionales del Perú (SAFAP)
- Formation: 2001
- Location: Peru
- Region served: Peru
- Official language: Spanish
- President: Roberto Silva
- General Manager: Fernando Revilla
- Affiliations: FIFPro

The Agremiación de Futbolistas Profesionales del Perú, generally referred to as SAFAP, is a sports union for football players. Its headquarters are in Peru. SAFAP has Roberto Silva and Fernando Revilla as the President and General Manager respectively.

== History ==
SAFAP was formed in 2001 in response to a need to defend the rights of professional football players in Peru who are treated unfairly by employers such as football clubs.

== See also ==
- Football in Peru
