= Michael Handelsman =

American historian

Michael Handelsman is an American specialist in Spanish language and of Latin American literature and Latin American studies, currently a Distinguished Humanities Professor at the University of Tennessee.
