= 2018 FIFA World Cup qualification (inter-confederation play-offs) =

Tournament details
- Dates: 10–15 November 2017
- Teams: 4 (from 4 confederations)

Tournament statistics
- Matches played: 4
- Goals scored: 6 (1.5 per match)
- Attendance: 191,219 (47,805 per match)
- Top scorer(s): (Australia) Mile Jedinak (3 goals)

For the 2018 FIFA World Cup qualification, there were two scheduled inter-confederation play-offs to determine the final two qualification spots to the 2018 FIFA World Cup. The matches were originally scheduled to be played between 6–14 November 2017, and later confirmed to take place between 10 and 15 November.

== Format ==
The draw for the inter-confederation play-offs was held as part of the 2018 FIFA World Cup Preliminary Draw on 25 July 2015, starting 18:00 MSK (UTC+3), at the Konstantinovsky Palace in Strelna, Saint Petersburg.

The four teams from the four confederations (AFC, CONCACAF, CONMEBOL, and OFC) were drawn into two ties. There was no seeding.

In each tie, the two teams played a two-legged home-and-away series. The two winners, decided on aggregate score, qualified for the 2018 FIFA World Cup in Russia. If the aggregate score was level, the away goals rule was applied, i.e. the team that scored more goals away from home over the two legs advanced. If away goals were also equal, then thirty minutes of extra time would be played. The away goals rule would again be applied after extra time, i.e. if there were goals scored during extra time and the aggregate score was still level, the visiting team would advance by virtue of more away goals scored. If no goals were scored during extra time, the tie would be decided by a penalty shoot-out.

== Qualified teams ==
Confederation	Placement	Team
AFC	Fourth round (play-off) winners	Australia
CONCACAF	Fifth round fourth place	Honduras
CONMEBOL	Fifth place	Peru
OFC	Third round winners	New Zealand

== Matches ==
The first legs were played on 10 and 11 November 2017, and the second legs were played on 15 November 2017.

=== CONCACAF v AFC ===
Team 1	Agg.	Team 2	1st leg	2nd leg
Honduras	1–3	Australia	0–0	1–3

10 November 2017
16:00 UTC−6
First leg

Honduras	0–0	Australia
	Report

Estadio Olímpico Metropolitano, San Pedro Sula
Attendance: 38,000
Referee: Daniele Orsato (Italy)
15 November 2017
20:00 UTC+11
Second leg

Australia	3–1	Honduras
Jedinak 54', 72' (pen.), 85' (pen.)	Report	Elis 90+3'

Stadium Australia, Sydney
Attendance: 77,060
Referee: Néstor Pitana (Argentina)

Australia won 3–1 on aggregate and qualified for the 2018 FIFA World Cup.

=== OFC v CONMEBOL ===
Team 1	Agg.	Team 2	1st leg	2nd leg
New Zealand	0–2	Peru	0–0	0–2

11 November 2017
16:15 UTC+13
First leg

New Zealand	0–0	Peru
	Report

Westpac Stadium, Wellington
Attendance: 37,034
Referee: Mark Geiger (United States)
15 November 2017
21:15 UTC−5
Second leg

Peru	2–0	New Zealand
Farfán 28'; Ramos 65'	Report

Estadio Nacional, Lima
Attendance: 39,125
Referee: Clément Turpin (France)

Peru won 2–0 on aggregate and qualified for the 2018 FIFA World Cup.

== Goalscorers ==
There were 6 goals scored in 4 matches, for an average of 1.5 goals per match.

3 goals

- (Australia) Mile Jedinak

1 goal

- (Honduras) Alberth Elis
- (Peru) Jefferson Farfán
- (Peru) Christian Ramos
