= 2018 FIFA World Cup qualification =

Tournament details
- Dates: 12 March 2015 – 15 November 2017
- Teams: 211 (from 6 confederations)

Tournament statistics
- Matches played: 869
- Goals scored: 2,454 (2.82 per match)
- Attendance: 18,720,691 (21,543 per match)
- Top scorer(s): (Poland) Robert Lewandowski (Saudi Arabia) Mohammad Al-Sahlawi (Note: This player's goal tally included one or more goals that were scored in subsequently forfeited matches, but were counted in FIFA's statistics nevertheless.) (United Arab Emirates) Ahmed Khalil (16 goals each)

The 2018 FIFA World Cup qualification process was a series of tournaments organised by the six FIFA confederations to decide 31 of the 32 teams which would play in the 2018 FIFA World Cup, with Russia qualifying automatically as hosts. All 210 remaining FIFA member associations were eligible to enter the qualifying process, and for the first time in World Cup history, all eligible national teams registered for the preliminary competition, but Zimbabwe and Indonesia were disqualified before playing their first matches. Bhutan, South Sudan, Gibraltar and Kosovo made their FIFA World Cup qualification debuts, while Myanmar participated after successfully appealing against a ban from the competition, although the team was obliged to play its home matches outside the country.

While the main qualifying draw took place at the Konstantinovsky Palace in Strelna, Saint Petersburg, on 25 July 2015, qualification matches were played before that. The first, between Timor-Leste and Mongolia, began in Dili on 12 March 2015 as part of the AFC's qualification, with East Timorese player Chiquito do Carmo scoring the first goal in qualification. (Note: The match originally ended 4–1 to Timor-Leste, but FIFA later awarded it as 3–0 to Mongolia due to Timor-Leste having fielded ineligible players. Nevertheless, FIFA continues to count the original goalscorers in its statistics. If they were excluded, the first scorer in qualification would be Chan Vathanaka of Cambodia, who scored against Macau later the same day.) Matches were also played in CONCACAF prior to the main draw.

== Qualified teams ==
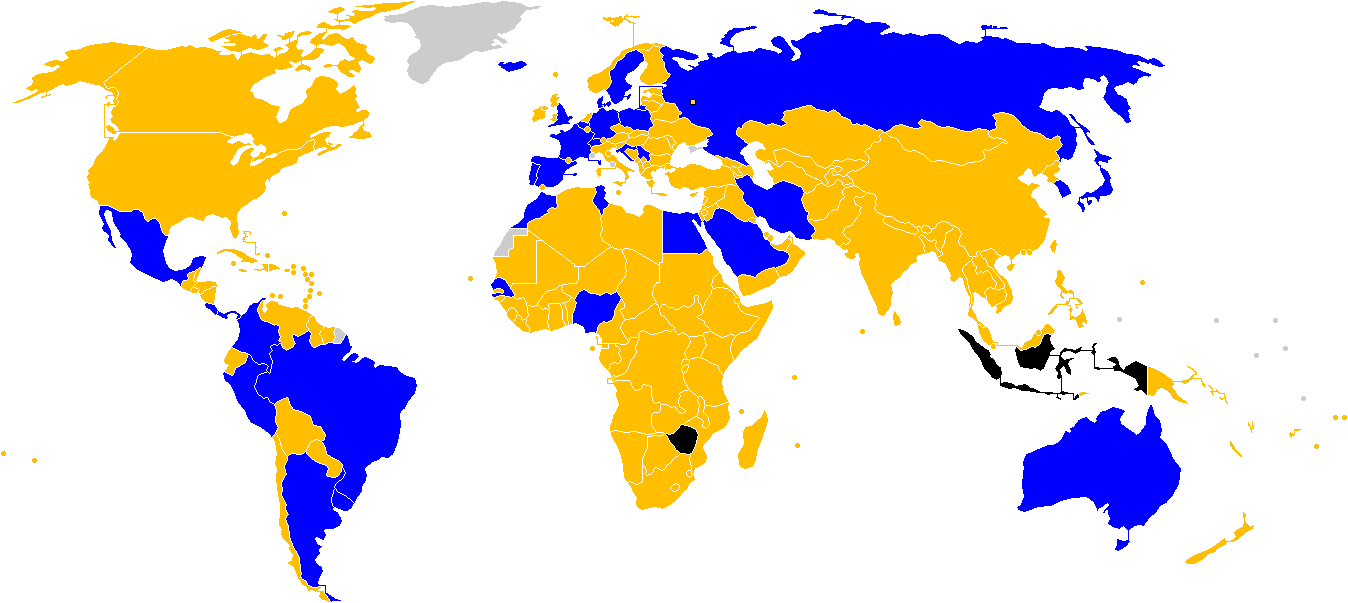
Teams qualified for World Cup Teams failed to qualify for World Cup Teams expelled from the tournament by FIFA prior to playing a match Countries were not FIFA members

Team	Method of qualification	Date of qualification	Total times qualified	Last time qualified	Current consecutive appearances	Previous best performance
Russia	Hosts	2 December 2010	11 (Note: This is the 4th appearance of Russia at the FIFA World Cup; however, FIFA considers Russia as the successor team of the Soviet Union who themselves qualified on 7 occasions.)	2014	2	Fourth place (1966)
Brazil	CONMEBOL winners	28 March 2017	21	2014	21	Winners (1958, 1962, 1970, 1994, 2002)
Iran	AFC third round group A winners	12 June 2017	5	2014	2	Group stage (1978, 1998, 2006, 2014)
Japan	AFC third round group B winners	31 August 2017	6	2014	6	Round of 16 (2002, 2010)
Mexico	CONCACAF fifth round winners	1 September 2017	16	2014	7	Quarter-finals (1970, 1986)
Belgium	UEFA Group H winners	3 September 2017	13	2014	2	Fourth place (1986)
South Korea	AFC third round group A runners-up	5 September 2017	10	2014	9	Fourth place (2002)
Saudi Arabia	AFC third round group B runners-up	5 September 2017	5	2006	1	Round of 16 (1994)
Germany	UEFA Group C winners	5 October 2017	19 (Note: Germany between 1950 and 1990 competed as "West Germany", as a separate East German team existed then.)	2014	17	Winners (1954, 1974, 1990, 2014)
England	UEFA Group F winners	5 October 2017	15	2014	6	Winners (1966)
Spain	UEFA Group G winners	6 October 2017	15	2014	11	Winners (2010)
Nigeria	CAF third round group B winners	7 October 2017	6	2014	3	Round of 16 (1994, 1998, 2014)
Costa Rica	CONCACAF fifth round runners-up	7 October 2017	5	2014	2	Quarter-finals (2014)
Poland	UEFA Group E winners	8 October 2017	8	2006	1	Third place (1974, 1982)
Egypt	CAF third round group E winners	8 October 2017	3	1990	1	First round (1934), group stage (1990)
Iceland	UEFA Group I winners	9 October 2017	1	—	1	—
Serbia	UEFA Group D winners	9 October 2017	12 (Note: This is the 2nd appearance of Serbia at the FIFA World Cup. However, FIFA considers Serbia as the successor team of the Yugoslavia and Serbia and Montenegro, who between them qualified on 10 occasions.)	2010	1	Fourth place (1930, 1962)
Portugal	UEFA Group B winners	10 October 2017	7	2014	5	Third place (1966)
France	UEFA Group A winners	10 October 2017	15	2014	6	Winners (1998)
Uruguay	CONMEBOL runners-up	10 October 2017	13	2014	3	Winners (1930, 1950)
Argentina	CONMEBOL third place	10 October 2017	17	2014	12	Winners (1978, 1986)
Colombia	CONMEBOL fourth place	10 October 2017	6	2014	2	Quarter-finals (2014)
Panama	CONCACAF fifth round third place	10 October 2017	1	—	1	—
Senegal	CAF third round group D winners	10 November 2017	2	2002	1	Quarter-finals (2002)
Morocco	CAF third round group C winners	11 November 2017	5	1998	1	Round of 16 (1986)
Tunisia	CAF third round group A winners	11 November 2017	5	2006	1	Group stage (1978, 1998, 2002, 2006)
Switzerland	UEFA second round winners	12 November 2017	11	2014	4	Quarter-finals (1934, 1938, 1954)
Croatia	UEFA second round winners	12 November 2017	5	2014	2	Third place (1998)
Sweden	UEFA second round winners	13 November 2017	12	2006	1	Runners-up (1958)
Denmark	UEFA second round winners	14 November 2017	5	2010	1	Quarter-finals (1998)
Australia	CONCACAF v AFC play-off winners	15 November 2017	5	2014	4	Round of 16 (2006)
Peru	OFC v CONMEBOL play-off winners	15 November 2017	5	1982	1	Quarter-finals (1970), second round (1978) (Note: In 1978, the second round was another group stage which involved 8 teams qualified from the first round.)

== Qualification process ==
The number of teams participating in the final tournament was 32. Even though the qualification process began in March 2015, the allocation of slots for each confederation was discussed by the FIFA Executive Committee on 30 May 2015 in Zürich after the FIFA Congress. It was decided that the same allocation as 2014 would be kept for the 2018 and 2022 tournaments.

=== Proposal for expansion ===
In October 2013, UEFA President Michel Platini proposed that the World Cup finals should be expanded from 32 to 40 teams starting from 2018. The format would have been the same, but in groups of five instead of four. This was in response to FIFA President Sepp Blatter's comments that Africa and Asia deserved more spots in the World Cup finals at the expense of European and South American teams. However, FIFA general secretary Jérôme Valcke said that expansion in 2018 would be "unlikely", while Russian sports minister Vitaly Mutko said that the country was "preparing on the basis that 32 teams will be taking part." Expansion was ultimately delayed until 10 January 2017, when the FIFA Council voted unanimously to expand to 48 teams starting in the 2026 FIFA World Cup.

=== Summary of qualification ===
While all FIFA members entered the tournament, not all competed. Zimbabwe were expelled from the competition on 12 March 2015 for their failure to pay former coach José Claudinei a severance fee and Indonesia were excluded from the qualifying competition following the suspension of their football association by FIFA on 30 May 2015. Kuwait had a number of their qualifiers cancelled for a similar suspension that began while their campaign was underway, which eventually resulted in their elimination. Brazil were the first team to achieve qualification for the tournament following their 3–0 victory over Paraguay and Uruguay's loss to Peru on 28 March 2017. Peru became the 32nd and final team to qualify when, 233 days after Brazil secured their place, they beat New Zealand 2–0 on aggregate in the OFC-CONMEBOL play-off.

Confederation	Direct slots in finals	Slots in play-offs	Teams started	Teams eliminated	Teams qualified	Qualifying start date	Qualifying end date
AFC	4	1	46	41	5	12 March 2015	15 November 2017
CAF	5	0	54	49	5	7 October 2015	14 November 2017
CONCACAF	3	1	35	32	3	22 March 2015	15 November 2017
CONMEBOL	4	1	10	5	5	8 October 2015	15 November 2017
OFC	0	1	11	11	0	31 August 2015	15 November 2017
UEFA	13+1	0	54+1	41	13+1	4 September 2016	14 November 2017
Total	31+1		210+1	179	31+1	12 March 2015	15 November 2017

Note: One team each from AFC, CONCACAF, CONMEBOL, and OFC played in the inter-confederation play-offs, between 10–15 November 2017 (CONCACAF v AFC and OFC v CONMEBOL).

Note: UEFA total includes +1 for Russia as hosts.

== Format ==
The formats of the qualifying competitions depended on each confederation (see below). Each round might be played in either of the following formats:

- League format, where more than two teams formed groups to play home-and-away round-robin matches, or in exceptions permitted by the FIFA Organizing Committee, single round-robin matches hosted by one of the participating teams or on neutral territory.
- Knockout format, where two teams played home-and-away two-legged matches.

=== Tiebreakers ===
In league format, the ranking of teams in each group is based on the following criteria (regulations Articles 20.6 and 20.7):

1. Points (3 points for a win, 1 point for a draw, 0 points for a loss)
2. Overall goal difference
3. Overall goals scored
4. Points in matches between tied teams
5. Goal difference in matches between tied teams
6. Goals scored in matches between tied teams
7. Away goals scored in matches between tied teams (if the tie is only between two teams in home-and-away league format)
8. Fair play points
  - first yellow card: minus 1 point
  - indirect red card (second yellow card): minus 3 points
  - direct red card: minus 4 points
  - yellow card and direct red card: minus 5 points
9. Drawing of lots by the FIFA Organising Committee

In cases where teams finishing in the same position across different groups are compared for determining which teams advance to the next stage, the criteria are decided by the confederation and require the approval of FIFA (regulations Article 20.8).

In knockout format, the team that has the higher aggregate score over the two legs progresses to the next round. In the event that aggregate scores finish level, the away goals rule is applied, i.e. the team that scored more goals away from home over the two legs progresses. If away goals are also equal, then thirty minutes of extra time are played, divided into two fifteen-minutes halves. The away goals rule is again applied after extra time, i.e. if there are goals scored during extra time and the aggregate score is still level, the visiting team qualifies by virtue of more away goals scored. If no goals are scored during extra time, the tie is decided by penalty shoot-out (regulations Article 20.9).

== Confederation qualification ==
=== AFC ===
The AFC Executive Committee meeting on 16 April 2014 approved the proposal to merge the preliminary qualification rounds of the FIFA World Cup and the AFC Asian Cup, which was expanded to 24 teams starting in 2019:

- First round: 12 teams (ranked 35–46) played home-and-away over two legs. The six winners advanced to the second round.
- Second round: 40 teams (teams ranked 1–34 and six first round winners) were divided into eight groups of five teams to play home-and-away round-robin matches. The eight group winners and the four best group runners-up advanced to the third round of FIFA World Cup qualification as well as qualified for the 2019 AFC Asian Cup finals.
- Third round: 12 teams (an increase from 10 for 2014) which had advanced from the second round were divided into two groups of six teams to play home-and-away round-robin matches. The top two teams of each group qualified for the 2018 FIFA World Cup, and the two third-placed teams advanced to the fourth round.
- Fourth round: Two third-placed teams of each third round group played home-and-away over two legs. The winners advanced to the inter-confederation play-offs.

==== Final positions (third round) ====
The draw for the third round was held on 12 April 2016 at the Mandarin Oriental Hotel in Kuala Lumpur, Malaysia.

Group A
Pos	Team	Pld	Pts
1	Iran	10	22
2	South Korea	10	15
3	Syria	10	13
4	Uzbekistan	10	13
5	China	10	12
6	Qatar	10	7

Source: FIFA

Group B
Pos	Team	Pld	Pts
1	Japan	10	20
2	Saudi Arabia	10	19
3	Australia	10	19
4	United Arab Emirates	10	13
5	Iraq	10	11
6	Thailand	10	2

Source: FIFA

==== Fourth round ====
The third-placed teams from each group in the third round played against each other home-and-away over two legs to determine which team advanced to the inter-confederation play-offs.

Team 1	Agg.	Team 2	1st leg	2nd leg
Syria	2–3	Australia	1–1	1–2 (a.e.t.)

=== CAF ===
The CAF Executive Committee approved the format for the qualifiers of the 2018 FIFA World Cup on 14 January 2015. However, on 9 July 2015 FIFA officially announced that only three rounds would be played instead of four.

- First round: 26 teams (ranked 28–53) played home-and-away over two legs. The 13 winners advanced to the second round.
- Second round: 40 teams (teams ranked 1–27 and 13 first round winners) played home-and-away over two legs. The 20 winners advanced to the third round.
- Third round: 20 teams which had advanced from the second round were divided into five groups of four teams to play home-and-away round-robin matches. The winners of each group qualified for the 2018 FIFA World Cup.

Zimbabwe, even though they entered the competition, were expelled on 12 March 2015 for their failure to pay former coach José Claudinei a severance fee. Therefore, only 53 African teams were involved in the draw.

==== Final positions (third round) ====
The draw for the third round was held on 24 June 2016 at the CAF headquarters in Cairo, Egypt.

Group A
Pos	Team	Pld	Pts
1	Tunisia	6	14
2	DR Congo	6	13
3	Libya	6	4
4	Guinea	6	3

Source: FIFA

Group B
Pos	Team	Pld	Pts
1	Nigeria	6	13
2	Zambia	6	8
3	Cameroon	6	7
4	Algeria	6	4

Source: FIFA

Group C
Pos	Team	Pld	Pts
1	Morocco	6	12
2	Ivory Coast	6	8
3	Gabon	6	6
4	Mali	6	4

Source: FIFA

Group D
Pos	Team	Pld	Pts
1	Senegal	6	14
2	Burkina Faso	6	9
3	Cape Verde	6	6
4	South Africa	6	4

Source: FIFA

Group E
Pos	Team	Pld	Pts
1	Egypt	6	13
2	Uganda	6	9
3	Ghana	6	7
4	Congo	6	2

Source: FIFA

=== CONCACAF ===
An amendment to the qualification process for this tournament had been suggested, which would see the first three rounds played as knockout rounds, with both the fourth round and the final round (referred to as 'The Hex') played as group stages. The first round would be played during the FIFA international dates of 23–31 March 2015. CONCACAF announced the full details on 12 January 2015:

- First round: 14 teams (teams ranked 22–35) played home-and-away over two legs. The seven winners advanced to the second round.
- Second round: 20 teams (teams ranked 9–21 and seven first round winners) played home-and-away over two legs. The ten winners advanced to the third round.
- Third round: 12 teams (teams ranked 7–8 and ten second round winners) played home-and-away over two legs. The six winners advanced to the fourth round.
- Fourth round: 12 teams (teams ranked 1–6 and six third round winners) were divided into three groups of four teams to play home-and-away round-robin matches. The top two teams of each group advanced to the fifth round.
- Fifth round: Six teams which had advanced from the fourth round played home-and-away round-robin matches in one single group. The top three teams qualified for the 2018 FIFA World Cup, and the fourth-placed team advanced to the inter-confederation play-offs.

==== Final positions (fifth round) ====
The draw for the fifth round (to decide the fixtures) was held on 8 July 2016 at the CONCACAF headquarters in Miami Beach, United States.

Pos	Team	Pld	Pts
1	Mexico	10	21
2	Costa Rica	10	16
3	Panama	10	13
4	Honduras	10	13
5	United States	10	12
6	Trinidad and Tobago	10	6

Source: FIFA

=== CONMEBOL ===
The qualification structure was the same as the previous five editions. The ten teams played in a league of home-and-away round-robin matches. The top four teams qualified for the 2018 FIFA World Cup, and the fifth-placed team advanced to the inter-confederation play-offs.

Unlike previous qualifying tournaments where the fixtures were pre-determined, the fixtures were decided by a draw held on 25 July 2015, at the Konstantinovsky Palace in Strelna, Saint Petersburg, Russia.

==== Final positions ====
Pos	Team	Pld	Pts
1	Brazil	18	41
2	Uruguay	18	31
3	Argentina	18	28
4	Colombia	18	27
5	Peru	18	26
6	Chile	18	26
7	Paraguay	18	24
8	Ecuador	18	20
9	Bolivia	18	14
10	Venezuela	18	12

Source: FIFA

=== OFC ===
The qualification structure was as follows:

- First round: Four teams (American Samoa, Cook Islands, Samoa, and Tonga) played a round-robin tournament at a single country. The winners advanced to the second round.
- Second round (2016 OFC Nations Cup): Eight teams (Fiji, New Caledonia, New Zealand, Papua New Guinea, Solomon Islands, Tahiti, Vanuatu, and the first round winner) played the tournament at a single country. For the group stage, they were divided into two groups of four teams. The top three teams of each group advanced to the third round.
- Third round: Six teams which had advanced from the second round were divided into two groups of three teams to play home-and-away round-robin matches. The two group winners met in a two-legged match with the winners advancing to the inter-confederation play-offs.

The OFC had considered different proposals of the qualifying tournament. A previous proposal adopted by the OFC in October 2014 would have the eight teams divided into two groups of four teams to play home-and-away round-robin matches in the second round, followed by the top two teams of each group advancing to the third round to play in a single group of home-and-away round-robin matches to decide the winners of the 2016 OFC Nations Cup which would qualify to the 2017 FIFA Confederations Cup and advance to the inter-confederation play-offs. However, it was later reported in April 2015 that the OFC had reversed its decision, and the 2016 OFC Nations Cup was played as a one-off tournament similar to the 2012 OFC Nations Cup.

==== Final positions (third round) ====
The draw for the third round was held on 8 July 2016 at the OFC headquarters in Auckland, New Zealand.

Group A

Pos	Team	Pld	Pts
1	New Zealand	4	10
2	New Caledonia	4	5
3	Fiji	4	1

Source: FIFA
Group B

Pos	Team	Pld	Pts
1	Solomon Islands	4	9
2	Tahiti	4	6
3	Papua New Guinea	4	3

Source: FIFA

Final
The draw for the final (which decided the order of legs) was held on 15 June 2017 at the OFC headquarters in Auckland, New Zealand. The winners of the final advanced to inter-confederation play-offs.

Team 1	Agg.	Team 2	1st leg	2nd leg
New Zealand	8–3	Solomon Islands	6–1	2–2

=== UEFA ===
Russia qualified automatically as hosts. The qualifying format for the remaining FIFA-affiliated UEFA teams was confirmed by the UEFA Executive Committee meeting on 22–23 March 2015 in Vienna.

- First round (group stage): 52 UEFA teams affiliated with FIFA at the time of the draw were divided into nine groups (seven groups of six teams and two groups of five teams) to play home-and-away round-robin matches. The winners of each group qualified for the 2018 FIFA World Cup, and the eight best runners-up advanced to the second round (play-offs). With the admission of Gibraltar and Kosovo as FIFA members in May 2016, both national teams were eligible to make their debuts in World Cup qualifying. With initially two groups in the first round having only five teams, Kosovo was assigned to Group I as it was decided that Bosnia and Herzegovina and Serbia should not play against Kosovo for security reasons, and Gibraltar was then added to Group H, so that each of the nine groups then had six teams.
- Second round (play-offs): Eight best runners-up from the first round played one other team over two legs, home and away. The four winners qualified for the 2018 FIFA World Cup. In deciding the eight best runners-up, the matches against the sixth-placed team in each group were discarded.

==== Final positions (first round) ====
The draw for the first round was held on 25 July 2015, at the Konstantinovsky Palace in Strelna, Saint Petersburg, Russia.

Group A
Pos	Team	Pld	Pts
1	France	10	23
2	Sweden	10	19
3	Netherlands	10	19
4	Bulgaria	10	13
5	Luxembourg	10	6
6	Belarus	10	5

Source: FIFA

Group B
Pos	Team	Pld	Pts
1	Portugal	10	27
2	Switzerland	10	27
3	Hungary	10	13
4	Faroe Islands	10	9
5	Latvia	10	7
6	Andorra	10	4

Source: FIFA

Group C
Pos	Team	Pld	Pts
1	Germany	10	30
2	Northern Ireland	10	19
3	Czech Republic	10	15
4	Norway	10	13
5	Azerbaijan	10	10
6	San Marino	10	0

Source: FIFA

Group D
Pos	Team	Pld	Pts
1	Serbia	10	21
2	Republic of Ireland	10	19
3	Wales	10	17
4	Austria	10	15
5	Georgia	10	5
6	Moldova	10	2

Source: FIFA

Group E
Pos	Team	Pld	Pts
1	Poland	10	25
2	Denmark	10	20
3	Montenegro	10	16
4	Romania	10	13
5	Armenia	10	7
6	Kazakhstan	10	3

Source: FIFA

Group F
Pos	Team	Pld	Pts
1	England	10	26
2	Slovakia	10	18
3	Scotland	10	18
4	Slovenia	10	15
5	Lithuania	10	6
6	Malta	10	1

Source: FIFA

Group G
Pos	Team	Pld	Pts
1	Spain	10	28
2	Italy	10	23
3	Albania	10	13
4	Israel	10	12
5	Macedonia	10	11
6	Liechtenstein	10	0

Source: FIFA

Group H
Pos	Team	Pld	Pts
1	Belgium	10	28
2	Greece	10	19
3	Bosnia and Herzegovina	10	17
4	Estonia	10	11
5	Cyprus	10	10
6	Gibraltar	10	0

Source: FIFA

Group I
Pos	Team	Pld	Pts
1	Iceland	10	22
2	Croatia	10	20
3	Ukraine	10	17
4	Turkey	10	15
5	Finland	10	9
6	Kosovo	10	1

Source: FIFA

Ranking of runners-up

Pos	Grp	Team	Pld	W	D	L	GF	GA	GD	Pts	Qualification
1	B	Switzerland	8	7	0	1	18	6	+12	21	Advance to second round (play-offs)
2	G	Italy	8	5	2	1	12	8	+4	17	Advance to second round (play-offs)
3	E	Denmark	8	4	2	2	13	6	+7	14	Advance to second round (play-offs)
4	I	Croatia	8	4	2	2	8	4	+4	14	Advance to second round (play-offs)
5	A	Sweden	8	4	1	3	18	9	+9	13	Advance to second round (play-offs)
6	C	Northern Ireland	8	4	1	3	10	6	+4	13	Advance to second round (play-offs)
7	H	Greece	8	3	4	1	9	5	+4	13	Advance to second round (play-offs)
8	D	Republic of Ireland	8	3	4	1	7	5	+2	13	Advance to second round (play-offs)
9	F	Slovakia	8	4	0	4	11	6	+5	12	

Source: FIFA
Rules for classification: Counting only matches against teams ranked first to fifth in the group, 1) Points; 2) Goal difference; 3) Goals scored; 4) Fair play points; 5) Drawing of lots.

==== Second round ====
The draw for the second round (play-offs) was held on 17 October 2017 at the FIFA headquarters in Zürich, Switzerland. The winners of each tie qualified for the World Cup.

Team 1	Agg.	Team 2	1st leg	2nd leg
Switzerland	1–0	Northern Ireland	1–0	0–0
Croatia	4–1	Greece	4–1	0–0
Denmark	5–1	Republic of Ireland	0–0	5–1
Sweden	1–0	Italy	1–0	0–0

== Inter-confederation play-offs ==
There were two inter-confederation playoffs to determine the final two qualification spots for the finals. The first legs were played on 10 and 11 November 2017, and the second legs were played on 15 November 2017.

The matchups were decided at the preliminary draw which was held on 25 July 2015, at the Konstantinovsky Palace in Strelna, Saint Petersburg, Russia.

=== CONCACAF v AFC ===
Team 1	Agg.	Team 2	1st leg	2nd leg
Honduras	1–3	Australia	0–0	1–3

=== OFC v CONMEBOL ===
Team 1	Agg.	Team 2	1st leg	2nd leg
New Zealand	0–2	Peru	0–0	0–2

== Top goalscorers ==
There were 2,454 goals scored in 869 matches, for an average of 2.82 goals per match.

16 goals

- (Poland) Robert Lewandowski
- (Saudi Arabia) Mohammad Al-Sahlawi
- (United Arab Emirates) Ahmed Khalil

15 goals

- (Portugal) Cristiano Ronaldo

11 goals

- (Australia) Tim Cahill
- (Belgium) Romelu Lukaku
- (Denmark) Christian Eriksen
- (Iran) Sardar Azmoun

10 goals

- (Australia) Mile Jedinak
- (Syria) Omar Kharbin
- (Uruguay) Edinson Cavani

9 goals

- (Guatemala) Carlos Ruiz
- (Portugal) André Silva
- (Qatar) Hassan Al-Haydos
- (United Arab Emirates) Ali Mabkhout

8 goals

- (China) Yang Xu
- (Iran) Mehdi Taremi
- (New Zealand) Chris Wood
- (Sweden) Marcus Berg
- (United States) Jozy Altidore

Below are goalscorer lists for all confederations and the inter-confederation play-offs:

- AFC
- CAF
- CONCACAF
- CONMEBOL
- OFC
- UEFA
- Inter-confederation play-offs
