= 2018 FIFA World Cup qualification – AFC third round =

International football competition

Tournament details
- Dates: 1 September 2016 – 5 September 2017
- Teams: 12 (from 1 confederation)

Tournament statistics
- Matches played: 60
- Goals scored: 129 (2.15 per match)
- Attendance: 1,950,068 (32,501 per match)
- Top scorer(s): (Australia) Tomi Juric (Iraq) Mohannad Abdul-Raheem (Saudi Arabia) Nawaf Al-Abed (United Arab Emirates) Ahmed Khalil (5 goals each)

The third round of AFC matches for 2018 FIFA World Cup qualification was played from 1 September 2016 to 5 September 2017.

== Format ==
A total of twelve teams which advanced from the second round (the eight group winners and the four best group runners-up) were divided into two groups of six teams to play home-and-away round-robin matches. The top two teams of each group qualified for the 2018 FIFA World Cup, and the two third-placed teams advanced to the fourth round.

== Qualified teams ==
Group (Second round)	Winners	Runners-up (Best 4)
A	Saudi Arabia	United Arab Emirates
B	Australia	—
C	Qatar	China
D	Iran	—
E	Japan	Syria
F	Thailand	Iraq
G	South Korea	—
H	Uzbekistan	—

== Seeding ==
The draw for the third round was held on 12 April 2016, at 16:30 MST (UTC+8), at the Mandarin Oriental Hotel in Kuala Lumpur, Malaysia.

The seeding were based on the FIFA World Rankings of April 2016 (shown in parentheses below). The twelve teams were seeded into six pots:

- Pot 1 contained the teams ranked 1–2.
- Pot 2 contained the teams ranked 3–4.
- Pot 3 contained the teams ranked 5–6.
- Pot 4 contained the teams ranked 7–8.
- Pot 5 contained the teams ranked 9–10.
- Pot 6 contained the teams ranked 11–12.

Each group contained one team from each of the six pots. The fixtures of each group were automatically decided based on the respective pot of each team.

Note: Bolded teams qualified for the World Cup. Italicised teams qualified for the fourth round.

Pot 1	Pot 2	Pot 3
1. **Iran** (42); 2. Australia (50)	3. **South Korea** (56); 4. **Japan** (57)	5. **Saudi Arabia** (60); 6. Uzbekistan (66)
Pot 4	Pot 5	Pot 6
7. United Arab Emirates (68); 8. China (81)	9. Qatar (83); 10. Iraq (105)	11. Syria (110); 12. Thailand (119)

== Groups ==
2018 FIFA World Cup qualification tiebreakers
In league format, the ranking of teams in each group was based on the following criteria (regulations Articles 20.6 and 20.7):
1. Points (3 points for a win, 1 point for a draw, 0 points for a loss)
2. Overall goal difference
3. Overall goals scored
4. Points in matches between tied teams
5. Goal difference in matches between tied teams
6. Goals scored in matches between tied teams
7. Away goals scored in matches between tied teams (if the tie was only between two teams in home-and-away league format)
8. Fair play points
  - first yellow card: minus 1 point
  - indirect red card (second yellow card): minus 3 points
  - direct red card: minus 4 points
  - yellow card and direct red card: minus 5 points
9. Drawing of lots by the FIFA Organising Committee

=== Group A ===
Pos	Team	Pld	W	D	L	GF	GA	GD	Pts	Qualification	Iran	South Korea	United Arab Republic	Uzbekistan	People's Republic of China	Qatar
1	Iran	10	6	4	0	10	2	+8	22	2018 FIFA World Cup	—	1–0	2–2	2–0	1–0	2–0
2	South Korea	10	4	3	3	11	10	+1	15	2018 FIFA World Cup	0–0	—	1–0	2–1	3–2	3–2
3	Syria	10	3	4	3	9	8	+1	13	Fourth round	0–0	0–0	—	1–0	2–2	3–1
4	Uzbekistan	10	4	1	5	6	7	−1	13		0–1	0–0	1–0	—	2–0	1–0
5	China	10	3	3	4	8	10	−2	12		0–0	1–0	0–1	1–0	—	0–0
6	Qatar	10	2	1	7	8	15	−7	7		0–1	3–2	1–0	0–1	1–2	—

Source: FIFA
Rules for classification: Qualification tiebreakers
1 September 2016
20:00 UTC+9

South Korea	3–2	China
Zheng Zhi 21' (o.g.); Lee Chung-yong 63'; Koo Ja-cheol 66'	Report (FIFA); Report (AFC)	Yu Hai 74'; Hao Junmin 77'

Seoul World Cup Stadium, Seoul
Attendance: 51,238
Referee: Mohammed Abdulla Hassan Mohamed (United Arab Emirates)
1 September 2016
20:00 UTC+5

Uzbekistan	1–0	Syria
Geynrikh 73'	Report (FIFA); Report (AFC)

Bunyodkor Stadium, Tashkent
Attendance: 29,100
Referee: Ryuji Sato (Japan)
1 September 2016
21:00 UTC+4:30

Iran	2–0	Qatar
Ghoochannejhad 90+4'; Jahanbakhsh 90+6'	Report (FIFA); Report (AFC)

Azadi Stadium, Tehran
Attendance: 78,000
Referee: Hettikamkanamge Perera (Sri Lanka)

6 September 2016
19:35 UTC+8

China	0–0	Iran
	Report (FIFA); Report (AFC)

Shenyang Olympic Sports Center Stadium, Shenyang
Attendance: 35,776
Referee: Adham Makhadmeh (Jordan)
6 September 2016
20:00 UTC+8

Syria	0–0	South Korea
	Report (FIFA); Report (AFC)

Tuanku Abdul Rahman Stadium, Seremban (Malaysia) (Note: Syria played their home matches outside Syria due to security concerns from the Syrian Civil War.)
Attendance: 4,350
Referee: Chris Beath (Australia)
6 September 2016
19:00 UTC+3

Qatar	0–1	Uzbekistan
	Report (FIFA); Report (AFC)	Krimets 86'

Jassim Bin Hamad Stadium, Doha
Attendance: 7,898
Referee: Ali Abdulnabi (Bahrain)

6 October 2016
20:00 UTC+9

South Korea	3–2	Qatar
Ki Sung-yueng 11'; Ji Dong-won 56'; Son Heung-min 58'	Report (FIFA); Report (AFC)	Al-Haydos 16' (pen.); Soria 45'

Suwon World Cup Stadium, Suwon
Attendance: 32,550
Referee: Mohd Amirul Izwan Yaacob (Malaysia)
6 October 2016
19:35 UTC+8

China	0–1	Syria
	Report (FIFA); Report (AFC)	Al-Mawas 54'

Shaanxi Province Stadium, Xi'an
Attendance: 37,368
Referee: Muhammad Taqi (Singapore)
6 October 2016
18:00 UTC+5

Uzbekistan	0–1	Iran
	Report (FIFA); Report (AFC)	Hosseini 27'

Bunyodkor Stadium, Tashkent
Attendance: 34,000
Referee: Ben Williams (Australia)

11 October 2016
18:00 UTC+5

Uzbekistan	2–0	China
Bikmaev 50'; Shukurov 85'	Report (FIFA); Report (AFC)

Bunyodkor Stadium, Tashkent
Attendance: 21,503
Referee: Hettikamkanamge Perera (Sri Lanka)
11 October 2016
18:15 UTC+3:30

Iran	1–0	South Korea
Azmoun 25'	Report (FIFA); Report (AFC)

Azadi Stadium, Tehran
Attendance: 75,800
Referee: Ryuji Sato (Japan)
11 October 2016
19:00 UTC+3

Qatar	1–0	Syria
Al-Haydos 37' (pen.)	Report (FIFA); Report (AFC)

Jassim Bin Hamad Stadium, Doha
Attendance: 9,940
Referee: Ahmed Al-Kaf (Oman)

15 November 2016
20:00 UTC+9

South Korea	2–1	Uzbekistan
Nam Tae-hee 67'; Koo Ja-cheol 85'	Report (FIFA); Report (AFC)	Bikmaev 25'

Seoul World Cup Stadium, Seoul
Attendance: 30,526
Referee: Fahad Al-Mirdasi (Saudi Arabia)
15 November 2016
19:35 UTC+8

China	0–0	Qatar
	Report (FIFA); Report (AFC)

Tuodong Stadium, Kunming
Attendance: 32,763
Referee: Mohanad Qasim Eesee Sarray (Iraq)
15 November 2016
20:45 UTC+8 (Note: The kickoff of the Syria v Iran match was originally at 20:00 local time but was delayed by 45 minutes due to heavy rain.)

Syria	0–0	Iran
	Report (FIFA); Report (AFC)

Tuanku Abdul Rahman Stadium, Seremban (Malaysia)
Attendance: 4,560
Referee: Ali Sabah (Iraq)

23 March 2017
19:35 UTC+8

China	1–0	South Korea
Yu Dabao 35'	Report (FIFA); Report (AFC)

Helong Stadium, Changsha
Attendance: 30,950
Referee: Peter Green (Australia)
23 March 2017
20:00 UTC+8

Syria	1–0	Uzbekistan
Kharbin 90+1' (pen.)	Report (FIFA); Report (AFC)

Hang Jebat Stadium, Krubong (Malaysia)
Attendance: 350
Referee: Mohammed Abdulla Hassan Mohamed (United Arab Emirates)
23 March 2017
19:00 UTC+3

Qatar	0–1	Iran
	Report (FIFA); Report (AFC)	Taremi 52'

Jassim Bin Hamad Stadium, Doha
Attendance: 10,237
Referee: Liu Kwok Man (Hong Kong)

28 March 2017
20:00 UTC+9

South Korea	1–0	Syria
Hong Jeong-ho 4'	Report (FIFA); Report (AFC)

Seoul World Cup Stadium, Seoul
Attendance: 30,352
Referee: Adham Makhadmeh (Jordan)
28 March 2017
16:30 UTC+4:30

Iran	1–0	China
Taremi 46'	Report (FIFA); Report (AFC)

Azadi Stadium, Tehran
Attendance: 78,115
Referee: Muhammad Taqi (Singapore)
28 March 2017
18:00 UTC+5

Uzbekistan	1–0	Qatar
Ahmedov 65'	Report (FIFA); Report (AFC)

Bunyodkor Stadium, Tashkent
Attendance: 19,000
Referee: Mohanad Qasim Eesee Sarray (Iraq)

12 June 2017
21:15 UTC+4:30

Iran	2–0	Uzbekistan
Azmoun 23'; Taremi 88'	Report (FIFA); Report (AFC)

Azadi Stadium, Tehran
Attendance: 59,730
Referee: Ahmed Al-Kaf (Oman)
13 June 2017
21:45 UTC+8

Syria	2–2	China
Al-Mawas 12' (pen.); Al Saleh 90+3'	Report (FIFA); Report (AFC)	Gao Lin 68' (pen.); Wu Xi 75'

Hang Jebat Stadium, Krubong (Malaysia)
Attendance: 4,737
Referee: Ammar Al-Jeneibi (United Arab Emirates)
13 June 2017
22:00 UTC+3

Qatar	3–2	South Korea
Al-Haydos 25', 75'; Afif 51'	Report (FIFA); Report (AFC)	Ki Sung-yueng 62'; Hwang Hee-chan 70'

Jassim Bin Hamad Stadium, Doha
Attendance: 5,373
Referee: Hettikamkanamge Perera (Sri Lanka)

31 August 2017
20:00 UTC+8

China	1–0	Uzbekistan
Gao Lin 84' (pen.)	Report (FIFA); Report (AFC)

Wuhan Sports Center Stadium, Wuhan
Attendance: 51,666
Referee: Hettikamkanamge Perera (Sri Lanka)
31 August 2017
21:00 UTC+9

South Korea	0–0	Iran
	Report (FIFA); Report (AFC)

Seoul World Cup Stadium, Seoul
Attendance: 63,124
Referee: Peter Green (Australia)
31 August 2017
20:00 UTC+8

Syria	3–1	Qatar
Kharbin 7', 54'; Al-Mawas 90+5'	Report (FIFA); Report (AFC)	Assadalla 35'

Hang Jebat Stadium, Krubong (Malaysia)
Attendance: 300
Referee: Ali Sabah (Iraq)

5 September 2017
18:00 UTC+3

Qatar	1–2	China
Afif 47'	Report (FIFA); Report (AFC)	Xiao Zhi 74'; Wu Lei 84'

Khalifa International Stadium, Doha
Attendance: 5,686
Referee: Ahmed Al-Kaf (Oman)
5 September 2017
19:30 UTC+4:30

Iran	2–2	Syria
Azmoun 45', 64'	Report (FIFA); Report (AFC)	Haj Mohamad 13'; Al Somah 90+3'

Azadi Stadium, Tehran
Attendance: 62,165
Referee: Ryuji Sato (Japan)
5 September 2017
20:00 UTC+5

Uzbekistan	0–0	South Korea
	Report (FIFA); Report (AFC)

Bunyodkor Stadium, Tashkent
Attendance: 34,000
Referee: Muhammad Taqi (Singapore)

=== Group B ===
Pos	Team	Pld	W	D	L	GF	GA	GD	Pts	Qualification	Japan	Saudi Arabia	Australia	United Arab Emirates	Iraq	Thailand
1	Japan	10	6	2	2	17	7	+10	20	2018 FIFA World Cup	—	2–1	2–0	1–2	2–1	4–0
2	Saudi Arabia	10	6	1	3	17	10	+7	19	2018 FIFA World Cup	1–0	—	2–2	3–0	1–0	1–0
3	Australia	10	5	4	1	16	11	+5	19	Fourth round	1–1	3–2	—	2–0	2–0	2–1
4	United Arab Emirates	10	4	1	5	10	13	−3	13		0–2	2–1	0–1	—	2–0	3–1
5	Iraq	10	3	2	5	11	12	−1	11		1–1	1–2	1–1	1–0	—	4–0
6	Thailand	10	0	2	8	6	24	−18	2		0–2	0–3	2–2	1–1	1–2	—

Source: FIFA
Rules for classification: Qualification tiebreakers
1 September 2016
18:30 UTC+8

Australia	2–0	Iraq
Luongo 58'; Juric 64'	Report (FIFA); Report (AFC)

Perth Oval, Perth
Attendance: 18,923
Referee: Alireza Faghani (Iran)
1 September 2016
19:35 UTC+9

Japan	1–2	United Arab Emirates
Honda 11'	Report (FIFA); Report (AFC)	Khalil 20', 54' (pen.)

Saitama Stadium 2002, Saitama
Attendance: 58,895
Referee: Abdulrahman Al-Jassim (Qatar)
1 September 2016
20:30 UTC+3

Saudi Arabia	1–0	Thailand
Al-Abed 84' (pen.)	Report (FIFA); Report (AFC)

King Fahd International Stadium, Riyadh
Attendance: 40,983
Referee: Fu Ming (China)

6 September 2016
19:00 UTC+8

Iraq	1–2	Saudi Arabia
Abdul-Raheem 18'	Report (FIFA); Report (AFC)	Al-Abed 81' (pen.), 88' (pen.)

Shah Alam Stadium, Shah Alam (Malaysia) (Note: Iraq played their home matches in Iran due to security concerns from the Iraqi Civil War. However, due to Saudi Arabia's refusal to play in Iran after the attack on their diplomatic missions in Iran, the first match was played in Malaysia. Also, due to United Arab Emirates' refusal to play in Iran after the diplomatic crisis in Qatar, the final match was played in Jordan.)
Attendance: 3,400
Referee: Khamis Al-Marri (Qatar)
6 September 2016
19:15 UTC+7

Thailand	0–2	Japan
	Report (FIFA); Report (AFC)	Haraguchi 19'; Asano 75'

Rajamangala Stadium, Bangkok
Attendance: 44,500
Referee: Mohsen Torky (Iran)
6 September 2016
19:30 UTC+4

United Arab Emirates	0–1	Australia
	Report (FIFA); Report (AFC)	Cahill 75'

Mohammed Bin Zayed Stadium, Abu Dhabi
Attendance: 40,893
Referee: Mohd Amirul Izwan Yaacob (Malaysia)

6 October 2016
19:35 UTC+9

Japan	2–1	Iraq
Haraguchi 26'; Yamaguchi 90+5'	Report (FIFA); Report (AFC)	Abdul-Amir 60'

Saitama Stadium 2002, Saitama
Attendance: 57,768
Referee: Kim Dong-jin (South Korea)
6 October 2016
20:00 UTC+4

United Arab Emirates	3–1	Thailand
Mabkhout 14', 47'; Khalil 90+3'	Report (FIFA); Report (AFC)	Tana 65'

Mohammed Bin Zayed Stadium, Abu Dhabi
Attendance: 18,242
Referee: Liu Kwok Man (Hong Kong)
6 October 2016
20:45 UTC+3

Saudi Arabia	2–2	Australia
Al-Jassim 5'; Al-Shamrani 79'	Report (FIFA); Report (AFC)	Sainsbury 45'; Juric 71'

King Abdullah Sports City, Jeddah
Attendance: 51,616
Referee: Ravshan Irmatov (Uzbekistan)

11 October 2016
20:00 UTC+11

Australia	1–1	Japan
Jedinak 52' (pen.)	Report (FIFA); Report (AFC)	Haraguchi 5'

Docklands Stadium, Melbourne
Attendance: 48,460
Referee: Nawaf Shukralla (Bahrain)
11 October 2016
16:00 UTC+3:30

Iraq	4–0	Thailand
Abdul-Raheem 7', 25', 87', 90+4'	Report (FIFA); Report (AFC)

PAS Stadium, Tehran (Iran)
Attendance: 2,255
Referee: Ma Ning (China)
11 October 2016
20:45 UTC+3

Saudi Arabia	3–0	United Arab Emirates
Al-Muwallad 73'; Al-Abed 79'; Al-Shehri 90+2'	Report (FIFA); Report (AFC)

King Abdullah Sports City, Jeddah
Attendance: 60,102
Referee: Kim Jong-hyeok (South Korea)

15 November 2016
19:35 UTC+9

Japan	2–1	Saudi Arabia
Kiyotake 45' (pen.); Haraguchi 80'	Report (FIFA); Report (AFC)	Om. Hawsawi 90'

Saitama Stadium 2002, Saitama
Attendance: 58,420
Referee: Muhammad Taqi (Singapore)
15 November 2016
19:00 UTC+7

Thailand	2–2	Australia
Teerasil 20', 57' (pen.)	Report (FIFA); Report (AFC)	Jedinak 9' (pen.), 65' (pen.)

Rajamangala Stadium, Bangkok
Attendance: 36,534
Referee: Fahad Al-Marri (Qatar)
15 November 2016
19:20 UTC+4

United Arab Emirates	2–0	Iraq
Khalil 26'; Matar 90+3'	Report (FIFA); Report (AFC)

Mohammed Bin Zayed Stadium, Abu Dhabi
Attendance: 14,583
Referee: Ilgiz Tantashev (Uzbekistan)

23 March 2017
16:30 UTC+4:30

Iraq	1–1	Australia
Yasin 76'	Report (FIFA); Report (AFC)	Leckie 40'

PAS Stadium, Tehran (Iran)
Attendance: 3,270
Referee: Kim Jong-hyeok (South Korea)
23 March 2017
19:00 UTC+7

Thailand	0–3	Saudi Arabia
	Report (FIFA); Report (AFC)	Al-Sahlawi 26'; Tanaboon 84' (o.g.); Al-Moasher 90+2'

Rajamangala Stadium, Bangkok
Attendance: 41,613
Referee: Ali Abdulnabi (Bahrain)
23 March 2017
19:30 UTC+4

United Arab Emirates	0–2	Japan
	Report (FIFA); Report (AFC)	Kubo 14'; Konno 52'

Hazza Bin Zayed Stadium, Al Ain
Attendance: 23,725
Referee: Ravshan Irmatov (Uzbekistan)

28 March 2017
20:00 UTC+11

Australia	2–0	United Arab Emirates
Irvine 7'; Leckie 78'	Report (FIFA); Report (AFC)

Sydney Football Stadium, Sydney
Attendance: 27,328
Referee: Ahmed Al-Kaf (Oman)
28 March 2017
19:35 UTC+9

Japan	4–0	Thailand
Kagawa 8'; Okazaki 19'; Kubo 57'; Yoshida 83'	Report (FIFA); Report (AFC)

Saitama Stadium 2002, Saitama
Attendance: 59,003
Referee: Kim Dong-jin (South Korea)
28 March 2017
20:30 UTC+3

Saudi Arabia	1–0	Iraq
Al-Shehri 53'	Report (FIFA); Report (AFC)

King Abdullah Sports City, Jeddah
Attendance: 60,153
Referee: Valentin Kovalenko (Uzbekistan)

8 June 2017 (Note: The Australia v Saudi Arabia match was brought forward from 13 June 2017 due to Australia's participation in the 2017 FIFA Confederations Cup.)
19:30 UTC+9:30

Australia	3–2	Saudi Arabia
Juric 7', 36'; Rogic 64'	Report (FIFA); Report (AFC)	Al-Dawsari 23'; Al-Sahlawi 45+2'

Adelaide Oval, Adelaide
Attendance: 29,785
Referee: Ravshan Irmatov (Uzbekistan)
13 June 2017
19:00 UTC+7

Thailand	1–1	United Arab Emirates
Mongkol 69'	Report (FIFA); Report (AFC)	Mabkhout 90+3'

Rajamangala Stadium, Bangkok
Attendance: 24,417
Referee: Muhammad Taqi (Singapore)
13 June 2017
16:55 UTC+4:30

Iraq	1–1	Japan
Kamel 73'	Report (FIFA); Report (AFC)	Osako 8'

PAS Stadium, Tehran (Iran)
Attendance: 983
Referee: Fu Ming (China)

29 August 2017
20:30 UTC+4

United Arab Emirates	2–1	Saudi Arabia
Mabkhout 21'; Khalil 60'	Report (FIFA); Report (AFC)	Al-Abed 20' (pen.)

Hazza Bin Zayed Stadium, Al Ain
Attendance: 10,221
Referee: Kim Jong-hyeok (South Korea)
31 August 2017
19:35 UTC+9

Japan	2–0	Australia
Asano 41'; Ideguchi 82'	Report (FIFA); Report (AFC)

Saitama Stadium 2002, Saitama
Attendance: 59,492
Referee: Alireza Faghani (Iran)
31 August 2017
19:00 UTC+7

Thailand	1–2	Iraq
Ibrahim 63' (o.g.)	Report (FIFA); Report (AFC)	Meram 34' Abdul-Amir 85' (pen.)

Rajamangala Stadium, Bangkok
Attendance: 22,604
Referee: Nawaf Shukralla (Bahrain)

5 September 2017
20:00 UTC+10

Australia	2–1	Thailand
Juric 69'; Leckie 86'	Report (FIFA); Report (AFC)	Pokklaw 82'

Melbourne Rectangular Stadium, Melbourne
Attendance: 26,393
Referee: Liu Kwok Man (Hong Kong)
5 September 2017
17:00 UTC+3

Iraq	1–0	United Arab Emirates
Hussein 29'	Report (FIFA); Report (AFC)

Amman International Stadium, Amman (Jordan)
Attendance: 2,185
Referee: Adham Makhadmeh (Jordan)
5 September 2017
20:30 UTC+3

Saudi Arabia	1–0	Japan
Al-Muwallad 63'	Report (FIFA); Report (AFC)

King Abdullah Sports City, Jeddah
Attendance: 62,165
Referee: Valentin Kovalenko (Uzbekistan)

== Goalscorers ==
There were 129 goals scored in 60 matches, for an average of 2.15 goals per match.

5 goals

- (Australia) Tomi Juric
- (Iraq) Mohannad Abdul-Raheem
- (Saudi Arabia) Nawaf Al-Abed
- (United Arab Emirates) Ahmed Khalil

4 goals

- (Iran) Sardar Azmoun
- (Japan) Genki Haraguchi
- (Qatar) Hassan Al-Haydos
- (United Arab Emirates) Ali Mabkhout

3 goals

- (Australia) Mile Jedinak
- (Australia) Mathew Leckie
- (Iran) Mehdi Taremi
- (Syria) Mahmoud Al-Mawas
- (Syria) Omar Kharbin

2 goals

- (Iraq) Saad Abdul-Amir
- (Japan) Takuma Asano
- (Japan) Yuya Kubo
- (Qatar) Akram Afif
- (Saudi Arabia) Fahad Al-Muwallad
- (Saudi Arabia) Mohammad Al-Sahlawi
- (Saudi Arabia) Yahya Al-Shehri
- (South Korea) Ki Sung-yueng
- (South Korea) Koo Ja-cheol
- (Thailand) Teerasil Dangda
- (Uzbekistan) Marat Bikmaev

1 goal

- (Australia) Tim Cahill
- (Australia) Jackson Irvine
- (Australia) Massimo Luongo
- (Australia) Tom Rogic
- (Australia) Trent Sainsbury
- (China) Hao Junmin
- (China) Wu Lei
- (China) Wu Xi
- (China) Xiao Zhi
- (China) Yu Dabao
- (China) Yu Hai
- (Iran) Reza Ghoochannejhad
- (Iran) Jalal Hosseini
- (Iran) Alireza Jahanbakhsh
- (Iraq) Ayman Hussein
- (Iraq) Mahdi Kamil
- (Iraq) Justin Meram
- (Iraq) Ahmed Yasin
- (Japan) Keisuke Honda
- (Japan) Yosuke Ideguchi
- (Japan) Shinji Kagawa
- (Japan) Hiroshi Kiyotake
- (Japan) Yasuyuki Konno
- (Japan) Shinji Okazaki
- (Japan) Yuya Osako
- (Japan) Hotaru Yamaguchi
- (Japan) Maya Yoshida
- (Qatar) Ali Assadalla
- (Qatar) Sebastián Soria
- (Saudi Arabia) Salem Al-Dawsari
- (Saudi Arabia) Taisir Al-Jassim
- (Saudi Arabia) Salman Al-Moasher
- (Saudi Arabia) Nasser Al-Shamrani
- (Saudi Arabia) Omar Hawsawi
- (South Korea) Hong Jeong-ho
- (South Korea) Hwang Hee-chan
- (South Korea) Ji Dong-won
- (South Korea) Lee Chung-yong
- (South Korea) Nam Tae-hee
- (South Korea) Son Heung-min
- (Syria) Ahmad Al Salih
- (Syria) Omar Al Somah
- (Syria) Tamer Haj Mohamad
- (Thailand) Pokklaw Anan
- (Thailand) Tana Chanabut
- (Thailand) Mongkol Tossakrai
- (United Arab Emirates) Ismail Matar
- (Uzbekistan) Odil Ahmedov
- (Uzbekistan) Alexander Geynrikh
- (Uzbekistan) Egor Krimets
- (Uzbekistan) Otabek Shukurov

1 own goal

- (China) Zheng Zhi (against South Korea)
- (Iraq) Ahmad Ibrahim (against Thailand)
- (Thailand) Tanaboon Kesarat (against Saudi Arabia)
