= 2018 FIFA World Cup qualification (OFC–CONMEBOL play-off) =

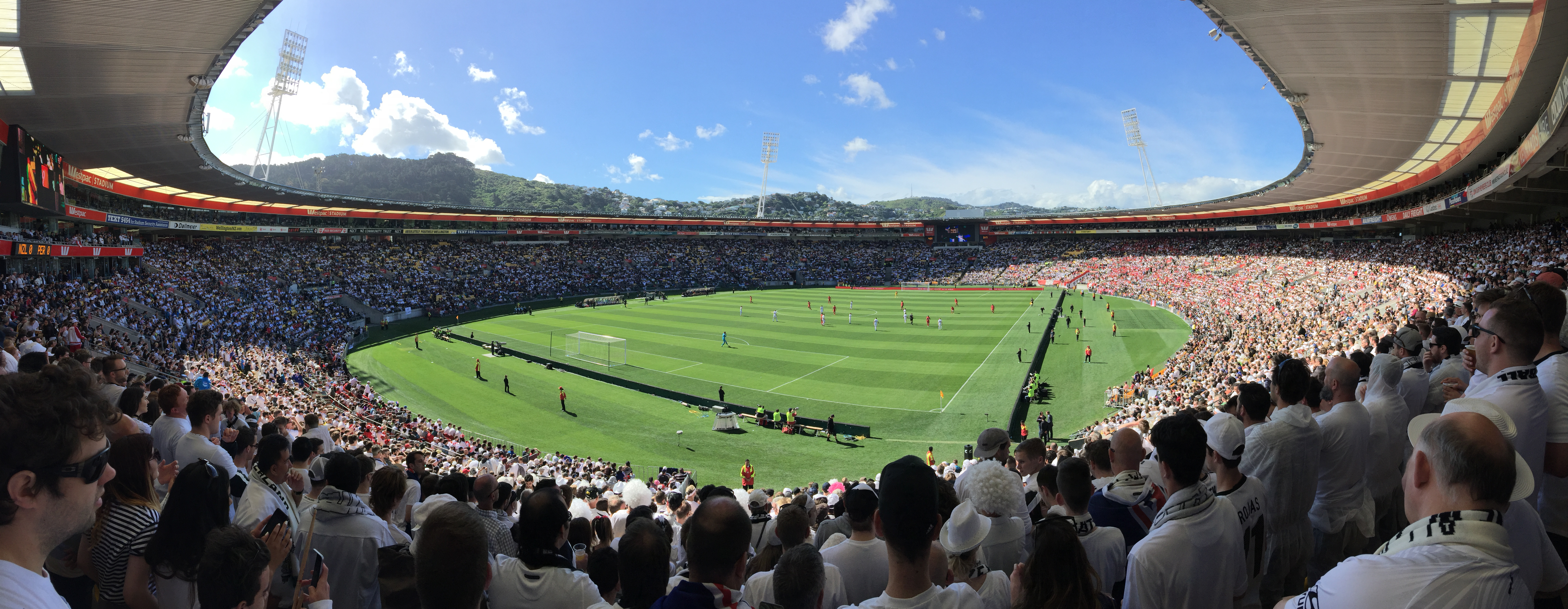
- First leg of the play-off
- Event: 2018 FIFA World Cup qualification
New Zealand	Peru
(New Zealand)	(Peru)
0	2
- on aggregate

First leg
New Zealand	Peru
0	0
- Date: 11 November 2017
- Venue: Westpac Stadium, Wellington
- Referee: Mark Geiger (United States)
- Attendance: 37,034

Second leg
Peru	New Zealand
2	0
- Date: 15 November 2017
- Venue: Estadio Nacional, Lima
- Referee: Clément Turpin (France)
- Attendance: 39,125

The 2018 FIFA World Cup OFC–CONMEBOL qualification play-off was a two-legged home-and-away tie between the winning team of the OFC Third round, New Zealand, and the fifth-placed team from the CONMEBOL qualifying tournament, Peru.

The matches were played on 11 and 15 November 2017. Peru emerged victorious and qualified for the 2018 FIFA World Cup.

== Overview ==
The play-off marked the third consecutive intercontinental play-off participation for New Zealand after previously losing to Mexico in 2013 and defeating Bahrain in 2009.

This was Peru's first participation in the inter-confederation play-offs. They previously qualified for the World Cup in 1982.

The draw for the order in which the two matches would be played was held by FIFA on 25 July 2015 in the World Cup Preliminary Draw.

== First leg ==
11 November 2017
16:15 UTC+13
First leg

New Zealand	0–0	Peru
	Report

Westpac Stadium, Wellington
Attendance: 37,034
Referee: Mark Geiger (United States)

New Zealand	Peru

GK	1	Stefan Marinovic
CB	5	Michael Boxall	(yellow card) 75'
CB	2	Winston Reid (c)
CB	20	Tommy Smith		(substituted off) 67'
RWB	8	Michael McGlinchey	(yellow card) 68'
LWB	3	Deklan Wynne
RM	7	Kosta Barbarouses
CM	15	Clayton Lewis		(substituted off) 74'
CM	14	Ryan Thomas
LM	18	Kip Colvey
CF	11	Marco Rojas		(substituted off) 78'
Substitutions:
DF	22	Andrew Durante		(substituted on) 67'
FW	9	Chris Wood		(substituted on) 74'
DF	6	Bill Tuiloma		(substituted on) 78'
Manager:
(England) Anthony Hudson

GK	1	Pedro Gallese
RB	3	Aldo Corzo
CB	15	Christian Ramos
CB	2	Alberto Rodríguez (c)
LB	6	Miguel Trauco
DM	13	Renato Tapia
RM	18	André Carrillo		(substituted off) 77'
LM	19	Yoshimar Yotún	(yellow card) 24'	(substituted off) 88'
AM	8	Christian Cueva		(substituted off) 90+1'
CF	10	Jefferson Farfán
CF	20	Edison Flores
Substitutions:
MF	7	Paolo Hurtado		(substituted on) 77'
MF	23	Pedro Aquino		(substituted on) 88'
MF	14	Andy Polo		(substituted on) 90+1'
Manager:
(Argentina) Ricardo Gareca

Assistant referees:
Joe Fletcher (Canada)
Frank Anderson (United States)
Fourth official:
Jair Marrufo (United States)

== Second leg ==
15 November 2017
21:15 UTC−5
Second leg

Peru	2–0	New Zealand
Farfán 28'; Ramos 65'	Report

Estadio Nacional, Lima
Attendance: 39,125
Referee: Clément Turpin (France)

Peru	New Zealand

GK	1	Pedro Gallese	(yellow card) 80'
RB	17	Luis Advíncula
CB	15	Christian Ramos	(yellow card) 75'
CB	2	Alberto Rodríguez (c)
LB	6	Miguel Trauco
DM	13	Renato Tapia
RM	14	Andy Polo		(substituted off) 74'
LM	20	Edison Flores	(yellow card) 21'
AM	8	Christian Cueva		(substituted off) 86'
CF	10	Jefferson Farfán
CF	11	Raúl Ruidíaz		(substituted off) 65'
Substitutions:
MF	19	Yoshimar Yotún		(substituted on) 65'
FW	18	André Carrillo		(substituted on) 74'
DF	4	Adrián Zela		(substituted on) 86'
Manager:
(Argentina) Ricardo Gareca

GK	1	Stefan Marinovic
RB	5	Michael Boxall
CB	2	Winston Reid (c)
CB	6	Bill Tuiloma		(substituted off) 46'
LB	22	Andrew Durante		(substituted off) 77'
RM	8	Michael McGlinchey
CM	15	Clayton Lewis		(substituted off) 58'
CM	14	Ryan Thomas	(yellow card) 19'
LM	3	Deklan Wynne
CF	7	Kosta Barbarouses
CF	18	Kip Colvey
Substitutions:
FW	9	Chris Wood		(substituted on) 46'
FW	11	Marco Rojas		(substituted on) 58'
FW	17	Jeremy Brockie		(substituted on) 77'
Manager:
(England) Anthony Hudson

Assistant referees:
Nicolas Danos (France)
Cyril Gringore (France)
Fourth official:
Benoît Bastien (France)
