= 2018 FIFA World Cup qualification (CONMEBOL) =

Tournament details
- Dates: 8 October 2015 – 10 October 2017
- Teams: 10 (from 1 confederation)

Tournament statistics
- Matches played: 90
- Goals scored: 242 (2.69 per match)
- Attendance: 3,365,010 (37,389 per match)
- Top scorer(s): (Uruguay) Edinson Cavani (10 goals)

The South American section of the 2018 FIFA World Cup qualification acted as qualifiers for the 2018 FIFA World Cup held in Russia, for national teams which are members of the South American Football Confederation (CONMEBOL). A total of 4.5 slots (4 direct slots and 1 inter-confederation play-off slot) in the final tournament were available for CONMEBOL teams.

Two-time defending Copa América champions Chile did not qualify for 2018 FIFA World Cup after a 3–0 loss to Brazil on the final day of qualifying campaign, resulting in a sixth-place finish. As a result, following intercontinental play-offs against the record five-time OFC Nations Cup champions New Zealand, Peru qualified for the World Cup for the first time since 1982.

== Format ==
The qualification structure was the same as for the previous five tournaments. The ten teams played in a league of home-and-away round-robin matches. The top four teams qualified for the 2018 FIFA World Cup, and the fifth-placed team advanced to the inter-confederation play-offs.

Unlike previous qualifying tournaments where the fixtures were pre-determined, the fixtures were determined by draw, which was held as part of the 2018 FIFA World Cup Preliminary Draw on 25 July 2015, starting 18:00 MSK (UTC+3), at the Konstantinovsky Palace in Strelna, Saint Petersburg, Russia.

For scheduling reasons, Argentina and Brazil were automatically positioned as Teams 4 and 5 respectively to ensure that no team has to play both of them on any double matchday. The remaining eight teams were drawn into one of the remaining eight positions from Teams 1 to 10 (except 4 and 5).

== Entrants ==
All ten national teams from CONMEBOL entered qualification.

Note: Bolded teams qualified directly for the World Cup. Peru advanced to the inter-confederation play-offs.

Draw position	Team	FIFA ranking at start of event
1	**Colombia**	5
2	Chile	9
3	Paraguay	61
4	**Argentina**	1
5	**Brazil**	7
6	Ecuador	31
7	Venezuela	69
8	Bolivia	67
9	Peru	50
10	**Uruguay**	20

== Schedule ==
There were a total of 18 matchdays: four in 2015, eight in 2016, and six in 2017.

2015
Matchday	Date
Matchday 1	5–13 October 2015
Matchday 2	5–13 October 2015
Matchday 3	9–17 November 2015
Matchday 4	9–17 November 2015

2016
Matchday	Date
Matchday 5	21–29 March 2016
Matchday 6	21–29 March 2016
Matchday 7	29 August – 6 September 2016
Matchday 8	29 August – 6 September 2016
Matchday 9	3–11 October 2016
Matchday 10	3–11 October 2016
Matchday 11	7–15 November 2016
Matchday 12	7–15 November 2016

2017
Matchday	Date
Matchday 13	20–28 March 2017
Matchday 14	20–28 March 2017
Matchday 15	28 August – 5 September 2017
Matchday 16	28 August – 5 September 2017
Matchday 17	2–10 October 2017
Matchday 18	2–10 October 2017

The inter-confederation play-offs were scheduled to be played between 6–14 November 2017.

The fixtures for CONMEBOL qualification were decided based on the draw positions, as follows:

Matchday	Fixtures
Matchday 1	1 v 9, 2 v 5, 4 v 6, 7 v 3, 8 v 10
Matchday 2	3 v 4, 5 v 7, 6 v 8, 9 v 2, 10 v 1
Matchday 3	2 v 1, 4 v 5, 6 v 10, 8 v 7, 9 v 3
Matchday 4	1 v 4, 3 v 8, 5 v 9, 7 v 6, 10 v 2
Matchday 5	2 v 4, 5 v 10, 6 v 3, 8 v 1, 9 v 7
Matchday 6	1 v 6, 3 v 5, 4 v 8, 7 v 2, 10 v 9
Matchday 7	1 v 7, 3 v 2, 4 v 10, 6 v 5, 8 v 9
Matchday 8	2 v 8, 5 v 1, 7 v 4, 9 v 6, 10 v 3
Matchday 9	3 v 1, 5 v 8, 6 v 2, 9 v 4, 10 v 7

Matchday	Fixtures
Matchday 10	1 v 10, 2 v 9, 4 v 3, 7 v 5, 8 v 6
Matchday 11	1 v 2, 3 v 9, 5 v 4, 7 v 8, 10 v 6
Matchday 12	2 v 10, 4 v 1, 6 v 7, 8 v 3, 9 v 5
Matchday 13	1 v 8, 3 v 6, 4 v 2, 7 v 9, 10 v 5
Matchday 14	2 v 7, 5 v 3, 6 v 1, 8 v 4, 9 v 10
Matchday 15	2 v 3, 5 v 6, 7 v 1, 9 v 8, 10 v 4
Matchday 16	1 v 5, 3 v 10, 4 v 7, 6 v 9, 8 v 2
Matchday 17	1 v 3, 2 v 6, 4 v 9, 7 v 10, 8 v 5
Matchday 18	3 v 7, 5 v 2, 6 v 4, 9 v 1, 10 v 8

== Standings ==
Pos	Team	Pld	W	D	L	GF	GA	GD	Pts	Qualification	(Brazil)	(Uruguay)	(Argentina)	(Colombia)	(Peru)	(Chile)	(Paraguay)	(Ecuador)	(Bolivia)	(Venezuela)
1	Brazil	18	12	5	1	41	11	+30	41	2018 FIFA World Cup	—	2–2	3–0	2–1	3–0	3–0	3–0	2–0	5–0	3–1
2	Uruguay	18	9	4	5	32	20	+12	31	2018 FIFA World Cup	1–4	—	0–0	3–0	1–0	3–0	4–0	2–1	4–2	3–0
3	Argentina	18	7	7	4	19	16	+3	28	2018 FIFA World Cup	1–1	1–0	—	3–0	0–0	1–0	0–1	0–2	2–0	1–1
4	Colombia	18	7	6	5	21	19	+2	27	2018 FIFA World Cup	1–1	2–2	0–1	—	2–0	0–0	1–2	3–1	1–0	2–0
5	Peru	18	7	5	6	27	26	+1	26	Inter-confederation play-offs	0–2	2–1	2–2	1–1	—	3–4	1–0	2–1	2–1	2–2
6	Chile	18	8	2	8	26	27	−1	26		2–0	3–1	1–2	1–1	2–1	—	0–3	2–1	3–0	3–1
7	Paraguay	18	7	3	8	19	25	−6	24		2–2	1–2	0–0	0–1	1–4	2–1	—	2–1	2–1	0–1
8	Ecuador	18	6	2	10	26	29	−3	20		0–3	2–1	1–3	0–2	1–2	3–0	2–2	—	2–0	3–0
9	Bolivia	18	4	2	12	16	38	−22	14		0–0	0–2	2–0	2–3	0–3	1–0	1–0	2–2	—	4–2
10	Venezuela	18	2	6	10	19	35	−16	12		0–2	0–0	2–2	0–0	2–2	1–4	0–1	1–3	5–0	—

Source: FIFA
Rules for classification: Qualification tiebreakers

== Matches ==
=== Matchday 1 ===
8 October 2015
16:00 UTC−4

Bolivia	0–2	Uruguay
	Report (FIFA); Report (CONMEBOL)	Cáceres 10'; Godín 69'

Estadio Hernando Siles, La Paz
Attendance: 36,000
Referee: Patricio Loustau (Argentina)

8 October 2015
15:30 UTC−5

Colombia	2–0	Peru
Gutiérrez 36'; Cardona 90+4'	Report (FIFA); Report (CONMEBOL)

Estadio Metropolitano Roberto Meléndez, Barranquilla
Attendance: 44,000
Referee: Antonio Arias (Paraguay)

8 October 2015
16:30 UTC−4:30

Venezuela	0–1	Paraguay
	Report (FIFA); Report (CONMEBOL)	González 85'

Estadio Cachamay, Ciudad Guayana
Attendance: 38,618
Referee: Hernando Buitrago (Colombia)

8 October 2015
20:30 UTC−3

Chile	2–0	Brazil
Vargas 72'; Sánchez 90'	Report (FIFA); Report (CONMEBOL)

Estadio Nacional Julio Martínez Prádanos, Santiago
Attendance: 42,000
Referee: Roddy Zambrano (Ecuador)

8 October 2015
21:00 UTC−3

Argentina	0–2	Ecuador
	Report (FIFA); Report (CONMEBOL)	Erazo 81'; Caicedo 82'

Estadio Monumental Antonio Vespucio Liberti, Buenos Aires
Attendance: 40,000
Referee: Julio Bascuñán (Chile)

=== Matchday 2 ===
13 October 2015
16:00 UTC−5

Ecuador	2–0	Bolivia
M. Bolaños 81'; Caicedo 90+5' (pen.)	Report (FIFA); Report (CONMEBOL)

Estadio Olímpico Atahualpa, Quito
Attendance: 27,333
Referee: Sandro Ricci (Brazil)

13 October 2015
20:00 UTC−3

Uruguay	3–0	Colombia
Godín 34'; Rolán 51'; Hernández 87'	Report (FIFA); Report (CONMEBOL)

Estadio Centenario, Montevideo
Attendance: 39,000
Referee: Héber Lopes (Brazil)

13 October 2015
21:00 UTC−3

Paraguay	0–0	Argentina
	Report (FIFA); Report (CONMEBOL)

Estadio Defensores del Chaco, Asunción
Attendance: 28,889
Referee: Andrés Cunha (Uruguay)

13 October 2015
22:00 UTC−3

Brazil	3–1	Venezuela
Willian 1', 42'; Ricardo Oliveira 73'	Report (FIFA); Report (CONMEBOL)	Santos 64'

Estádio Castelão, Fortaleza
Attendance: 48,970
Referee: Darío Ubriaco (Uruguay)

13 October 2015
21:15 UTC−5

Peru	3–4	Chile
Farfán 10', 36' (pen.); Guerrero 90+2'	Report (FIFA); Report (CONMEBOL)	Sánchez 7', 44'; Vargas 41', 49'

Estadio Nacional, Lima
Attendance: 39,180
Referee: Néstor Pitana (Argentina)

=== Matchday 3 ===
12 November 2015
16:00 UTC−4

Bolivia	4–2	Venezuela
Ramallo 19', 45+1'; Arce 23' (pen.); Cardozo 49'	Report (FIFA); Report (CONMEBOL)	M. Rondón 32'; Blanco 55'

Estadio Hernando Siles, La Paz
Attendance: 30,923
Referee: Víctor Hugo Carrillo (Peru)

12 November 2015
16:00 UTC−5

Ecuador	2–1	Uruguay
Caicedo 23'; F. Martínez 59'	Report (FIFA); Report (CONMEBOL)	Cavani 49'

Estadio Olímpico Atahualpa, Quito
Attendance: 32,650
Referee: Ricardo Marques (Brazil)

12 November 2015
20:30 UTC−3

Chile	1–1	Colombia
Vidal 45'	Report (FIFA); Report (CONMEBOL)	Rodríguez 68'

Estadio Nacional Julio Martínez Prádanos, Santiago
Attendance: 45,316
Referee: Enrique Cáceres (Paraguay)

13 November 2015 (Note: The match between Argentina and Brazil was originally scheduled to be played on 12 November 2015, 21:00 UTC−3, but was postponed to the following day due to bad weather.)
21:00 UTC−3

Argentina	1–1	Brazil
Lavezzi 34'	Report (FIFA); Report (CONMEBOL)	Lucas Lima 58'

Estadio Monumental Antonio Vespucio Liberti, Buenos Aires
Attendance: 53,000
Referee: Antonio Arias (Paraguay)

13 November 2015
21:15 UTC−5

Peru	1–0	Paraguay
Farfán 20'	Report (FIFA); Report (CONMEBOL)

Estadio Nacional, Lima
Attendance: 26,000
Referee: Julio Bascuñán (Chile)

=== Matchday 4 ===
17 November 2015
15:30 UTC−5

Colombia	0–1	Argentina
	Report (FIFA); Report (CONMEBOL)	Biglia 19'

Estadio Metropolitano Roberto Meléndez, Barranquilla
Attendance: 46,000
Referee: Carlos Vera (Ecuador)

17 November 2015
16:30 UTC−4:30

Venezuela	1–3	Ecuador
J. Martínez 84'	Report (FIFA); Report (CONMEBOL)	F. Martínez 15'; Montero 23'; Caicedo 60'

Estadio Cachamay, Ciudad Guayana
Attendance: 31,659
Referee: Gery Vargas (Bolivia)

17 November 2015
20:00 UTC−3

Paraguay	2–1	Bolivia
Lezcano 61'; Barrios 64'	Report (FIFA); Report (CONMEBOL)	Duk 59'

Estadio Defensores del Chaco, Asunción
Attendance: 35,850
Referee: José Argote (Venezuela)

17 November 2015
20:10 UTC−3

Uruguay	3–0	Chile
Godín 23'; A. Pereira 61'; Caceres 65'	Report (FIFA); Report (CONMEBOL)

Estadio Centenario, Montevideo
Attendance: 58,000
Referee: Wilmar Roldán (Colombia)

17 November 2015
21:00 UTC−3

Brazil	3–0	Peru
Douglas Costa 22'; Renato Augusto 57'; Filipe Luís 76'	Report (FIFA); Report (CONMEBOL)

Itaipava Arena Fonte Nova, Salvador
Attendance: 45,000
Referee: Hernando Buitrago (Colombia)

=== Matchday 5 ===
24 March 2016
16:00 UTC−4

Bolivia	2–3	Colombia
Arce 50' (pen.); Chumacero 62'	Report (FIFA); Report (CONMEBOL)	Rodríguez 10'; Bacca 41'; Cardona 90+2'

Estadio Hernando Siles, La Paz
Attendance: 26,765
Referee: Wilton Sampaio (Brazil)

24 March 2016
16:00 UTC−5

Ecuador	2–2	Paraguay
E. Valencia 20'; Mena 90+2'	Report (FIFA); Report (CONMEBOL)	Lezcano 38', 59'

Estadio Olímpico Atahualpa, Quito
Attendance: 34,817
Referee: Daniel Fedorczuk (Uruguay)

24 March 2016
20:30 UTC−3

Chile	1–2	Argentina
Gutiérrez 11'	Report (FIFA); Report (CONMEBOL)	Di María 20'; Mercado 25'

Estadio Nacional Julio Martínez Prádanos, Santiago
Attendance: 44,536
Referee: Héber Lopes (Brazil)

24 March 2016
21:15 UTC−5

Peru	2–2	Venezuela
Guerrero 61'; Ruidíaz 90+4'	Report (FIFA); Report (CONMEBOL)	Otero 33' (pen.); Villanueva 57'

Estadio Nacional, Lima
Attendance: 35,459
Referee: Enrique Cáceres (Paraguay)

25 March 2016
21:45 UTC−3

Brazil	2–2	Uruguay
Douglas Costa 1'; Renato Augusto 25'	Report (FIFA); Report (CONMEBOL)	Cavani 30'; Suárez 48'

Arena Pernambuco, Recife
Attendance: 45,010
Referee: Néstor Pitana (Argentina)

=== Matchday 6 ===
29 March 2016
15:30 UTC−5

Colombia	3–1	Ecuador
Bacca 15', 67'; Pérez 48'	Report (FIFA); Report (CONMEBOL)	Arroyo 90'

Estadio Metropolitano Roberto Meléndez, Barranquilla
Attendance: 38,400
Referee: Enrique Osses (Chile)

29 March 2016
20:00 UTC−3

Uruguay	1–0	Peru
Cavani 51'	Report (FIFA); Report (CONMEBOL)

Estadio Centenario, Montevideo
Attendance: 55,000
Referee: Roddy Zambrano (Ecuador)

29 March 2016
19:00 UTC−4:30

Venezuela	1–4	Chile
Otero 9'	Report (FIFA); Report (CONMEBOL)	Pinilla 33', 52'; Vidal 72', 90+2'

Estadio Agustín Tovar, Barinas
Attendance: 24,101
Referee: Diego Haro (Peru)

29 March 2016
20:30 UTC−3

Argentina	2–0	Bolivia
Mercado 20'; Messi 30' (pen.)	Report (FIFA); Report (CONMEBOL)

Estadio Mario Alberto Kempes, Córdoba
Attendance: 53,000
Referee: Jesús Valenzuela (Venezuela)

29 March 2016
20:45 UTC−4

Paraguay	2–2	Brazil
Lezcano 40'; É. Benítez 49'	Report (FIFA); Report (CONMEBOL)	Ricardo Oliveira 79'; Dani Alves 90+2'

Estadio Defensores del Chaco, Asunción
Attendance: 34,457
Referee: Wilmar Roldán (Colombia)

=== Matchday 7 ===
1 September 2016
16:00 UTC−4

Bolivia	0–3 Awarded (Note: FIFA awarded Peru a 3–0 win as a result of Bolivia fielding the ineligible player Nelson Cabrera, after Bolivia had defeated Peru 2–0. Nelson Cabrera had previously represented Paraguay and did not meet eligibility rules.)	Peru
Escobar 38'; Raldes 86'	Report (FIFA); Report (CONMEBOL)

Estadio Hernando Siles, La Paz
Attendance: 26,765
Referee: José Argote (Venezuela)

1 September 2016
15:30 UTC–5

Colombia	2–0	Venezuela
Rodríguez 45+2'; M. Torres 82'	Report (FIFA); Report (CONMEBOL)

Estadio Metropolitano Roberto Meléndez, Barranquilla
Attendance: 37,099
Referee: Daniel Fedorczuk (Uruguay)

1 September 2016
16:00 UTC−5

Ecuador	0–3	Brazil
	Report (FIFA); Report (CONMEBOL)	Neymar 72' (pen.); Gabriel Jesus 87', 90+2'

Estadio Olímpico Atahualpa, Quito
Attendance: 37,887
Referee: Enrique Cáceres (Paraguay)

1 September 2016
20:30 UTC−3

Argentina	1–0	Uruguay
Messi 43'	Report (FIFA); Report (CONMEBOL)

Estadio Malvinas Argentinas, Mendoza
Attendance: 44,597
Referee: Julio Bascuñán (Chile)

1 September 2016
20:00 UTC−4

Paraguay	2–1	Chile
O. Romero 6'; Da Silva 9'	Report (FIFA); Report (CONMEBOL)	Vidal 37'

Estadio Defensores del Chaco, Asunción
Attendance: 25,000
Referee: Néstor Pitana (Argentina)

=== Matchday 8 ===
6 September 2016
20:00 UTC−3

Uruguay	4–0	Paraguay
Cavani 17', 53'; Rodríguez 41'; Suárez 45' (pen.)	Report (FIFA); Report (CONMEBOL)

Estadio Centenario, Montevideo
Attendance: 39,400
Referee: Wilton Sampaio (Brazil)

6 September 2016
20:30 UTC−3

Chile	3–0 Awarded (Note: FIFA awarded Chile a 3–0 win as a result of Bolivia fielding the ineligible player Nelson Cabrera, after the match had finished 0–0. Nelson Cabrera had previously represented Paraguay and did not meet eligibility rules.)	Bolivia
	Report (FIFA); Report (CONMEBOL)

Estadio Monumental David Arellano, Santiago (Note: Chile were sanctioned by FIFA to play one home match (against Bolivia on 6 September 2016) away from Estadio Nacional Julio Martínez Prádanos, Santiago due to homophobic chants by the team's fans, with a possible ban on a second match subject to a probation period of two years. Since Chile committed another infringement during this period, a second match ban on playing at Estadio Nacional Julio Martínez Prádanos will be served (against Venezuela on 28 March 2017). Chile was sanctioned with a ban on playing at Estadio Nacional Julio Martínez Prádanos for two further matches (against Paraguay on 31 August 2017 and against Ecuador on 5 October 2017) after similar incidents.)
Attendance: 40,000
Referee: Ricardo Marques (Brazil)

6 September 2016
19:30 UTC−4

Venezuela	2–2	Argentina
Juanpi 34'; J. Martínez 53'	Report (FIFA); Report (CONMEBOL)	Pratto 57'; Otamendi 82'

Estadio Metropolitano de Mérida, Mérida
Attendance: 42,000
Referee: Roddy Zambrano (Ecuador)

6 September 2016
20:45 UTC−4

Brazil	2–1	Colombia
Miranda 2'; Neymar 74'	Report (FIFA); Report (CONMEBOL)	Marquinhos 37' (o.g.)

Arena da Amazônia, Manaus
Attendance: 36,609
Referee: Patricio Loustau (Argentina)

6 September 2016
21:15 UTC−5

Peru	2–1	Ecuador
Cueva 19' (pen.); Tapia 78'	Report (FIFA); Report (CONMEBOL)	Achilier 30'

Estadio Nacional, Lima
Attendance: 30,000
Referee: Wilmar Roldán (Colombia)

=== Matchday 9 ===
6 October 2016
16:00 UTC−5

Ecuador	3–0	Chile
A. Valencia 19'; Ramírez 23'; Caicedo 47'	Report (FIFA); Report (CONMEBOL)

Estadio Olímpico Atahualpa, Quito
Attendance: 30,000
Referee: Mauro Vigliano (Argentina)

6 October 2016
20:00 UTC−3

Uruguay	3–0	Venezuela
Lodeiro 29'; Cavani 46', 78'	Report (FIFA); Report (CONMEBOL)

Estadio Centenario, Montevideo
Attendance: 44,880
Referee: Raúl Orosco (Bolivia)

6 October 2016
20:30 UTC−3

Paraguay	0–1	Colombia
	Report (FIFA); Report (CONMEBOL)	Cardona 90+2'

Estadio Defensores del Chaco, Asunción
Attendance: 33,000
Referee: Julio Bascuñán (Chile)

6 October 2016
21:45 UTC−3

Brazil	5–0	Bolivia
Neymar 10'; Coutinho 25'; Filipe Luís 38'; Gabriel Jesus 43'; Firmino 75'	Report (FIFA); Report (CONMEBOL)

Arena das Dunas, Natal
Attendance: 40,013
Referee: Wilson Lamouroux (Colombia)

6 October 2016
21:15 UTC−5

Peru	2–2	Argentina
Guerrero 57'; Cueva 83' (pen.)	Report (FIFA); Report (CONMEBOL)	Funes Mori 15'; Higuaín 77'

Estadio Nacional, Lima
Attendance: 39,700
Referee: Sandro Ricci (Brazil)

=== Matchday 10 ===
11 October 2016
16:00 UTC−4

Bolivia	2–2	Ecuador
Escobar 3', 43'	Report (FIFA); Report (CONMEBOL)	E. Valencia 47', 88'

Estadio Hernando Siles, La Paz
Attendance: 18,033
Referee: Mario Díaz de Vivar (Paraguay)

11 October 2016
15:30 UTC−5

Colombia	2–2	Uruguay
Aguilar 16'; Mina 85'	Report (FIFA); Report (CONMEBOL)	Rodríguez 27'; Suárez 73'

Estadio Metropolitano Roberto Meléndez, Barranquilla
Attendance: 47,000
Referee: Néstor Pitana (Argentina)

11 October 2016
20:30 UTC−3

Argentina	0–1	Paraguay
	Report (FIFA); Report (CONMEBOL)	González 17'

Estadio Mario Alberto Kempes, Córdoba
Attendance: 51,200
Referee: Daniel Fedorczuk (Uruguay)

11 October 2016
20:30 UTC−3

Chile	2–1	Peru
Vidal 9', 85'	Report (FIFA); Report (CONMEBOL)	Flores 75'

Estadio Nacional Julio Martínez Prádanos, Santiago
Attendance: 38,662
Referee: Roddy Zambrano (Ecuador)

11 October 2016
20:30 UTC−4

Venezuela	0–2	Brazil
	Report (FIFA); Report (CONMEBOL)	Gabriel Jesus 7'; Willian 53'

Estadio Metropolitano de Mérida, Mérida
Attendance: 42,700
Referee: Víctor Hugo Carrillo (Peru)

=== Matchday 11 ===
10 November 2016
15:30 UTC−5

Colombia	0–0	Chile
	Report (FIFA); Report (CONMEBOL)

Estadio Metropolitano Roberto Meléndez, Barranquilla
Attendance: 45,916
Referee: Wilton Sampaio (Brazil)

10 November 2016
20:00 UTC−3

Uruguay	2–1	Ecuador
Coates 12'; Rolán 45+1'	Report (FIFA); Report (CONMEBOL)	Caicedo 44'

Estadio Centenario, Montevideo
Attendance: 54,868
Referee: Víctor Hugo Carrillo (Peru)

10 November 2016
20:30 UTC−3

Paraguay	1–4	Peru
Riveros 10'	Report (FIFA); Report (CONMEBOL)	Ramos 49'; Flores 71'; Cueva 79'; É. Benítez 84' (o.g.)

Estadio Defensores del Chaco, Asunción
Attendance: 36,000
Referee: Patricio Loustau (Argentina)

10 November 2016
21:45 UTC−2

Brazil	3–0	Argentina
Coutinho 25'; Neymar 45+1'; Paulinho 58'	Report (FIFA); Report (CONMEBOL)

Mineirão, Belo Horizonte
Attendance: 53,490
Referee: Julio Bascuñán (Chile)

10 November 2016
19:45 UTC−4

Venezuela	5–0	Bolivia
Kouffati 2'; J. Martínez 10', 67', 69'; Otero 74'	Report (FIFA); Report (CONMEBOL)

Estadio Monumental de Maturín, Maturín
Attendance: 49,750
Referee: Andrés Cunha (Uruguay)

=== Matchday 12 ===
15 November 2016
16:00 UTC−4

Bolivia	1–0	Paraguay
Gómez 77' (o.g.)	Report (FIFA); Report (CONMEBOL)

Estadio Hernando Siles, La Paz
Attendance: 13,285
Referee: Christian Ferreyra (Uruguay)

15 November 2016
16:00 UTC−5

Ecuador	3–0	Venezuela
Mina 50'; M. Bolaños 84'; E. Valencia 87'	Report (FIFA); Report (CONMEBOL)

Estadio Olímpico Atahualpa, Quito
Attendance: 28,000
Referee: Roberto Tobar (Chile)

15 November 2016
20:30 UTC−3

Argentina	3–0	Colombia
Messi 10'; Pratto 22'; Di María 84'	Report (FIFA); Report (CONMEBOL)

Estadio San Juan del Bicentenario, San Juan
Attendance: 24,000
Referee: Roddy Zambrano (Ecuador)

15 November 2016
20:30 UTC−3

Chile	3–1	Uruguay
Vargas 45+1'; Sánchez 60', 75'	Report (FIFA); Report (CONMEBOL)	Cavani 16'

Estadio Nacional Julio Martínez Prádanos, Santiago
Attendance: 46,011
Referee: Enrique Cáceres (Paraguay)

15 November 2016
21:15 UTC−5

Peru	0–2	Brazil
	Report (FIFA); Report (CONMEBOL)	Gabriel Jesus 57'; Renato Augusto 78'

Estadio Nacional, Lima
Attendance: 38,700
Referee: Wilmar Roldán (Colombia)

=== Matchday 13 ===
23 March 2017
15:30 UTC−5

Colombia	1–0	Bolivia
Rodríguez 83'	Report (FIFA); Report (CONMEBOL)

Estadio Metropolitano Roberto Meléndez, Barranquilla
Attendance: 39,000
Referee: Ricardo Marques (Brazil)

23 March 2017
20:00 UTC−3

Paraguay	2–1	Ecuador
Valdez 11'; Alonso 65'	Report (FIFA); Report (CONMEBOL)	Caicedo 69' (pen.)

Estadio Defensores del Chaco, Asunción
Attendance: 16,287
Referee: José Argote (Venezuela)

23 March 2017
20:00 UTC−3

Uruguay	1–4	Brazil
Cavani 9' (pen.)	Report (FIFA); Report (CONMEBOL)	Paulinho 18', 51', 90+2'; Neymar 74'

Estadio Centenario, Montevideo
Attendance: 55,676
Referee: Patricio Loustau (Argentina)

23 March 2017
20:30 UTC−3

Argentina	1–0	Chile
Messi 15' (pen.)	Report (FIFA); Report (CONMEBOL)

Estadio Monumental Antonio Vespucio Liberti, Buenos Aires
Attendance: 55,000
Referee: Sandro Ricci (Brazil)

23 March 2017
19:30 UTC−4

Venezuela	2–2	Peru
Villanueva 23'; Otero 39'	Report (FIFA); Report (CONMEBOL)	Carrillo 46'; Guerrero 64'

Estadio Monumental de Maturín, Maturín
Attendance: 35,920
Referee: Enrique Cáceres (Paraguay)

=== Matchday 14 ===
28 March 2017
16:00 UTC−4

Bolivia	2–0	Argentina
Arce 31'; Moreno 52'	Report (FIFA); Report (CONMEBOL)

Estadio Hernando Siles, La Paz
Attendance: 29,943
Referee: Wilmar Roldán (Colombia)

28 March 2017
16:00 UTC−5

Ecuador	0–2	Colombia
	Report (FIFA); Report (CONMEBOL)	Rodríguez 20'; Cuadrado 34'

Estadio Olímpico Atahualpa, Quito
Attendance: 35,538
Referee: Néstor Pitana (Argentina)

28 March 2017
19:00 UTC−3

Chile	3–1	Venezuela
Sánchez 4'; Paredes 6', 22'	Report (FIFA); Report (CONMEBOL)	S. Rondón 62'

Estadio Monumental David Arellano, Santiago
Attendance: 34,136
Referee: Andrés Cunha (Uruguay)

28 March 2017
21:45 UTC−3

Brazil	3–0	Paraguay
Coutinho 34'; Neymar 63'; Marcelo 85'	Report (FIFA); Report (CONMEBOL)

Arena Corinthians, São Paulo
Attendance: 45,000
Referee: Víctor Hugo Carrillo (Peru)

28 March 2017
21:15 UTC−5

Peru	2–1	Uruguay
Guerrero 34'; Flores 62'	Report (FIFA); Report (CONMEBOL)	Sánchez 30'

Estadio Nacional, Lima
Attendance: 35,200
Referee: Julio Bascuñán (Chile)

=== Matchday 15 ===
31 August 2017
17:00 UTC−4

Venezuela	0–0	Colombia
	Report (FIFA); Report (CONMEBOL)

Estadio Polideportivo de Pueblo Nuevo, San Cristóbal
Attendance: 38,479
Referee: Wilton Sampaio (Brazil)

31 August 2017
19:30 UTC−3

Chile	0–3	Paraguay
	Report (FIFA); Report (CONMEBOL)	Vidal 24' (o.g.); Cáceres 55'; Ortiz 90+2'

Estadio Monumental David Arellano, Santiago
Attendance: 43,000
Referee: Néstor Pitana (Argentina)

31 August 2017
20:00 UTC−3

Uruguay	0–0	Argentina
	Report (FIFA); Report (CONMEBOL)

Estadio Centenario, Montevideo
Attendance: 55,000
Referee: Víctor Hugo Carrillo (Peru)

31 August 2017
21:45 UTC−3

Brazil	2–0	Ecuador
Paulinho 69'; Coutinho 76'	Report (FIFA); Report (CONMEBOL)

Arena do Grêmio, Porto Alegre
Attendance: 38,000
Referee: Mario Díaz de Vivar (Paraguay)

31 August 2017
21:15 UTC−5

Peru	2–1	Bolivia
Flores 55'; Cueva 59'	Report (FIFA); Report (CONMEBOL)	Álvarez 72'

Estadio Monumental "U", Lima (Note: The match between Peru and Bolivia was originally scheduled to be played at the Estadio Nacional, but was moved to the Estadio Monumental "U" due to poor conditions of the pitch at the Estadio Nacional.)
Attendance: 60,000
Referee: Andrés Cunha (Uruguay)

=== Matchday 16 ===
5 September 2017
16:00 UTC−4

Bolivia	1–0	Chile
Arce 59' (pen.)	Report (FIFA); Report (CONMEBOL)

Estadio Hernando Siles, La Paz
Attendance: 31,555
Referee: Wilmar Roldán (Colombia)

5 September 2017
15:30 UTC−5

Colombia	1–1	Brazil
Falcao 56'	Report (FIFA); Report (CONMEBOL)	Willian 45+2'

Estadio Metropolitano Roberto Meléndez, Barranquilla
Attendance: 46,500
Referee: Jesús Valenzuela (Venezuela)

5 September 2017
16:00 UTC−5

Ecuador	1–2	Peru
E. Valencia 79' (pen.)	Report (FIFA); Report (CONMEBOL)	Flores 73'; Hurtado 76'

Estadio Olímpico Atahualpa, Quito
Attendance: 35,000
Referee: Enrique Cáceres (Paraguay)

5 September 2017
20:30 UTC−3

Argentina	1–1	Venezuela
Feltscher 54' (o.g.)	Report (FIFA); Report (CONMEBOL)	Murillo 51'

Estadio Monumental Antonio Vespucio Liberti, Buenos Aires
Attendance: 60,000
Referee: Roberto Tobar (Chile)

5 September 2017
20:00 UTC−4

Paraguay	1–2	Uruguay
Á. Romero 88'	Report (FIFA); Report (CONMEBOL)	Valverde 76'; Gómez 80' (o.g.)

Estadio Defensores del Chaco, Asunción
Attendance: 35,000
Referee: Sandro Ricci (Brazil)

=== Matchday 17 ===
5 October 2017
16:00 UTC−4

Bolivia	0–0	Brazil
	Report (FIFA); Report (CONMEBOL)

Estadio Hernando Siles, La Paz
Attendance: 34,725
Referee: Fernando Rapallini (Argentina)

5 October 2017
17:00 UTC−4

Venezuela	0–0	Uruguay
	Report (FIFA); Report (CONMEBOL)

Estadio Polideportivo de Pueblo Nuevo, San Cristóbal
Attendance: 32,100
Referee: Anderson Daronco (Brazil)

5 October 2017
20:30 UTC–3

Argentina	0–0	Peru
	Report (FIFA); Report (CONMEBOL)

La Bombonera, Buenos Aires
Attendance: 47,960
Referee: Wilton Sampaio (Brazil)

5 October 2017
20:30 UTC−3

Chile	2–1	Ecuador
Vargas 22'; Sánchez 85'	Report (FIFA); Report (CONMEBOL)	R. Ibarra 82'

Estadio Monumental David Arellano, Santiago
Attendance: 45,000
Referee: Sandro Ricci (Brazil)

5 October 2017
18:30 UTC−5

Colombia	1–2	Paraguay
Falcao 79'	Report (FIFA); Report (CONMEBOL)	Cardozo 89'; Sanabria 90+2'

Estadio Metropolitano Roberto Meléndez, Barranquilla
Attendance: 47,000
Referee: Ricardo Marques (Brazil)

=== Matchday 18 ===
10 October 2017
20:30 UTC−3

Brazil	3–0	Chile
Paulinho 55'; Gabriel Jesus 57', 90+2'	Report (FIFA); Report (CONMEBOL)

Allianz Parque, São Paulo
Attendance: 46,008
Referee: Roddy Zambrano (Ecuador)

10 October 2017
18:30 UTC−5

Ecuador	1–3	Argentina
R. Ibarra 1'	Report (FIFA); Report (CONMEBOL)	Messi 11', 19', 62'

Estadio Olímpico Atahualpa, Quito
Attendance: 29,000
Referee: Anderson Daronco (Brazil)

10 October 2017
20:30 UTC−3

Paraguay	0–1	Venezuela
	Report (FIFA); Report (CONMEBOL)	Herrera 84'

Estadio Defensores del Chaco, Asunción
Attendance: 38,786
Referee: Wilton Sampaio (Brazil)

10 October 2017
18:30 UTC−5

Peru	1–1	Colombia
Ospina 77' (o.g.)	Report (FIFA); Report (CONMEBOL)	Rodríguez 55'

Estadio Nacional, Lima
Attendance: 39,637
Referee: Sandro Ricci (Brazil)

10 October 2017
20:30 UTC−3

Uruguay	4–2	Bolivia
Cáceres 39'; Cavani 42'; Suárez 60', 76'	Report (FIFA); Report (CONMEBOL)	Silva 24' (o.g.); Godín 79' (o.g.)

Estadio Centenario, Montevideo
Attendance: 60,000
Referee: Ricardo Marques (Brazil)

== Inter-confederation play-offs ==
The draw for the inter-confederation play-offs was held as part of the 2018 FIFA World Cup Preliminary Draw on 25 July 2015, starting 18:00 MSK (UTC+3), at the Konstantinovsky Palace in Strelna, Saint Petersburg. The fifth-placed team from CONMEBOL was drawn against the first-placed team from OFC, with the CONMEBOL team hosting the second leg.

Team 1	Agg.	Team 2	1st leg	2nd leg
New Zealand	0–2	**Peru**	0–0	0–2

== Qualified teams ==
The following five teams from CONMEBOL qualified for the final tournament.

Team	Qualified as	Qualified on	Previous appearances in FIFA World Cup^{1}
Brazil	Winners	28 March 2017	20 (all) (1930, 1934, 1938, 1950, 1954, **1958**, **1962**, 1966, **1970**, 1974, 1978, 1982, 1986, 1990, **1994**, 1998, **2002**, 2006, 2010, 2014)
Uruguay	Runners-up	10 October 2017	12 (**1930**, **1950**, 1954, 1962, 1966, 1970, 1974, 1986, 1990, 2002, 2010, 2014)
Argentina	Third place	10 October 2017	16 (1930, 1934, 1958, 1962, 1966, 1974, **1978**, 1982, **1986**, 1990, 1994, 1998, 2002, 2006, 2010, 2014)
Colombia	Fourth place	10 October 2017	5 (1962, 1990, 1994, 1998, 2014)
Peru	OFC v CONMEBOL play-off winners	15 November 2017	4 (1930, 1970, 1978, 1982)

^{1} Bold indicates champions for that year. Italic indicates hosts for that year.

== Goalscorers ==
There were 242 goals scored in 90 matches, for an average of 2.69 goals per match.

10 goals

- (Uruguay) Edinson Cavani

7 goals

- (Argentina) Lionel Messi
- (Brazil) Gabriel Jesus
- (Chile) Alexis Sánchez
- (Ecuador) Felipe Caicedo

6 goals

- (Brazil) Neymar
- (Brazil) Paulinho
- (Chile) Arturo Vidal
- (Colombia) James Rodríguez

5 goals

- (Chile) Eduardo Vargas
- (Ecuador) Enner Valencia
- (Peru) Edison Flores
- (Peru) Paolo Guerrero
- (Uruguay) Luis Suárez
- (Venezuela) Josef Martínez

4 goals

- (Bolivia) Juan Carlos Arce
- (Brazil) Philippe Coutinho
- (Brazil) Willian
- (Paraguay) Darío Lezcano
- (Peru) Christian Cueva
- (Venezuela) Rómulo Otero

3 goals

- (Bolivia) Pablo Escobar
- (Brazil) Renato Augusto
- (Colombia) Carlos Bacca
- (Colombia) Edwin Cardona
- (Peru) Jefferson Farfán
- (Uruguay) Martín Cáceres
- (Uruguay) Diego Godín

2 goals

- (Argentina) Ángel Di María
- (Argentina) Gabriel Mercado
- (Argentina) Lucas Pratto
- (Bolivia) Rodrigo Ramallo
- (Brazil) Douglas Costa
- (Brazil) Filipe Luís
- (Brazil) Ricardo Oliveira
- (Chile) Esteban Paredes
- (Chile) Mauricio Pinilla
- (Colombia) Radamel Falcao
- (Ecuador) Miller Bolaños
- (Ecuador) Romario Ibarra
- (Ecuador) Fidel Martínez
- (Paraguay) Derlis González
- (Uruguay) Cristian Rodríguez
- (Uruguay) Diego Rolán
- (Venezuela) Mikel Villanueva

1 goal

- (Argentina) Lucas Biglia
- (Argentina) Ramiro Funes Mori
- (Argentina) Gonzalo Higuaín
- (Argentina) Ezequiel Lavezzi
- (Argentina) Nicolás Otamendi
- (Bolivia) Gilbert Álvarez
- (Bolivia) Rudy Cardozo
- (Bolivia) Alejandro Chumacero
- (Bolivia) Yasmani Duk
- (Bolivia) Marcelo Moreno
- (Bolivia) Ronald Raldes
- (Brazil) Dani Alves
- (Brazil) Lucas Lima
- (Brazil) Marcelo
- (Brazil) Miranda
- (Brazil) Roberto Firmino
- (Chile) Felipe Gutiérrez
- (Colombia) Abel Aguilar
- (Colombia) Juan Cuadrado
- (Colombia) Teófilo Gutiérrez
- (Colombia) Yerry Mina
- (Colombia) Sebastián Pérez
- (Colombia) Macnelly Torres
- (Ecuador) Gabriel Achilier
- (Ecuador) Michael Arroyo
- (Ecuador) Frickson Erazo
- (Ecuador) Ángel Mena
- (Ecuador) Arturo Mina
- (Ecuador) Jefferson Montero
- (Ecuador) Cristian Ramírez
- (Ecuador) Antonio Valencia
- (Paraguay) Júnior Alonso
- (Paraguay) Lucas Barrios
- (Paraguay) Édgar Benítez
- (Paraguay) Víctor Cáceres
- (Paraguay) Óscar Cardozo
- (Paraguay) Paulo da Silva
- (Paraguay) Richard Ortiz
- (Paraguay) Cristian Riveros
- (Paraguay) Ángel Romero
- (Paraguay) Óscar Romero
- (Paraguay) Antonio Sanabria
- (Paraguay) Bruno Valdez
- (Peru) André Carrillo
- (Peru) Paolo Hurtado
- (Peru) Christian Ramos
- (Peru) Raúl Ruidíaz
- (Peru) Renato Tapia
- (Uruguay) Sebastián Coates
- (Uruguay) Abel Hernández
- (Uruguay) Nicolás Lodeiro
- (Uruguay) Álvaro Pereira
- (Uruguay) Carlos Sánchez
- (Uruguay) Federico Valverde
- (Venezuela) Richard Blanco
- (Venezuela) Yangel Herrera
- (Venezuela) Juanpi
- (Venezuela) Jacobo Kouffati
- (Venezuela) Jhon Murillo
- (Venezuela) Mario Rondón
- (Venezuela) Salomón Rondón
- (Venezuela) Christian Santos

1 own goal

- (Brazil) Marquinhos (against Colombia)
- (Chile) Arturo Vidal (against Paraguay)
- (Colombia) David Ospina (against Peru)
- (Paraguay) Édgar Benítez (against Peru)
- (Uruguay) Diego Godín (against Bolivia)
- (Uruguay) Gastón Silva (against Bolivia)
- (Venezuela) Rolf Feltscher (against Argentina)

2 own goals

- (Paraguay) Gustavo Gómez (against Bolivia and Uruguay)
