= 2018 FIFA World Cup qualification – AFC fourth round =

International football competition

The fourth round of AFC matches for 2018 FIFA World Cup qualification was played from 5 to 10 October 2017. The winners advanced to the inter-confederation play-offs against the fourth-placed team from the CONCACAF fifth round.

== Format ==
In the fourth round, the third-placed teams from the two third round groups competed in a two-legged home-and-away play-off.

The order of legs was pre-determined by the AFC, announced during the draw for the third round. The third-placed team from Group A hosted the first leg, and the third-placed team from Group B hosted the second leg.

== Qualified teams ==
Group (third round)	Third place
A	Syria
B	Australia

== Matches ==
Team 1	Agg.	Team 2	1st leg	2nd leg
Syria	2–3	Australia	1–1	1–2 (a.e.t.)

5 October 2017
20:30 UTC+8

Syria	1–1	Australia
Al Somah 85' (pen.)	Report (FIFA); Report (AFC)	Kruse 40'

Hang Jebat Stadium, Krubong (Malaysia) (Note: Syria played their home match in Malaysia due to security concerns from the Syrian Civil War.)
Attendance: 2,150
Referee: Alireza Faghani (Iran)
10 October 2017
20:00 UTC+11

Australia	2–1 (a.e.t.)	Syria
Cahill 13', 109'	Report (FIFA); Report (AFC)	Al Somah 6'

Stadium Australia, Sydney
Attendance: 42,136
Referee: Ravshan Irmatov (Uzbekistan) (Note: Irmatov was replaced by fourth official Ilgiz Tantashev (Uzbekistan) during extra time.)

Australia won 3–2 on aggregate and advanced to the inter-confederation play-offs.

== Goalscorers ==
There were 5 goals scored in 2 matches, for an average of 2.5 goals per match.

2 goals

- (Australia) Tim Cahill
- (Syria) Omar Al Somah

1 goal

- (Australia) Robbie Kruse
