= Christian Ramos =

Peruvian footballer (born 1988)

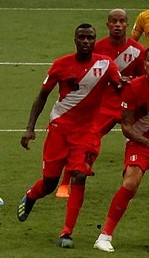
- Ramos (left) with Peru at the 2018 FIFA World Cup

Personal information
- Full name: Christian Guillermo Martín Ramos Garagay
- Date of birth: 4 November 1988 (age 38)
- Place of birth: Lima, Peru
- Height: 1.82 m (6 ft 0 in)
- Position: Centre-back

Team information
- Current team: Deportivo Municipal

Youth career
- 1999–2002: Sporting Cristal
- 2003: Academia Tito Drago
- 2004–2006: Sporting Cristal

Senior career*
Years	Team	Apps	(Gls)
2007–2008	Sporting Cristal	55	(2)
2009–2010	Universidad San Martín	70	(2)
2011–2012	Alianza Lima	17	(2)
2012	Universidad San Martín	69	(10)
2013–2016	Juan Aurich	103	(4)
2016–2017	Gimnasia y Esgrima (LP)	4	(0)
2017	→ Emelec (loan)	25	(0)
2018	Veracruz	8	(0)
2018–2019	Al-Nassr FC	10	(0)
2019	→ Melgar (loan)	10	(0)
2019	Universitario	12	(0)
2020–2021	UCV	35	(1)
2022–2023	Alianza Lima	25	(0)
2023	Sport Boys	29	(0)
2024	Deportivo Garcilaso	3	(0)
2024	Sport Boys	12	(0)
2025	Alianza Universidad	9	(1)
2025	Universidad de San Martín	4	(1)
2026–	Deportivo Municipal	0	(0)

International career^{‡}
2009–2022	Peru	89	(3)
Medal record
Men's football
Representing Peru
Copa América
Third place	2011 Argentina
Third place	2015 Chile
- * Club domestic league appearances and goals as of 22:26, 9 May 2020 ‡ National team caps and goals as of 16:04, 23 March 2024 (UTC)

Christian Guillermo Martín Ramos Garagay (born 4 November 1988) is a Peruvian professional footballer who plays for Deportivo Municipal and the Peru national team as a centre-back.

== Club career ==
=== Sporting Cristal ===
Ramos joined Sporting Cristal at the age of 13 but only made his debut for the reserve team in the 2007 season. The 2008 season witnessed the rise of Ramos himself, where he played 47 games and was instrumental in guiding Sporting Cristal to the 2009 Copa Libertadores. However, he left the club in 2009 after seeing himself being sidelined.

=== Universidad de San Martín ===
Club Deportivo Universidad de San Martín de Porres was Ramos' second club in his career, and also where he achieved his height, with USMP won the 2010 season and qualified for the 2011 Copa Libertadores. His performance impressed then-Peru national football team manager Sergio Markarián, allowing him to be summoned to the national team for the first time.

=== Alianza Lima ===
The 2011 season saw Ramos signing for his favorite childhood club Alianza Lima, where Ramos was instrumental in helping Alianza Lima to come close for the title, scoring three after 17 games, but his dream crashed when Alianza Lima fell to Juan Aurich in the decisive final series. His performance impressed Argentine and Portuguese clubs, with Ramos almost got the chance, but he lacked necessary documents and thus failed to move abroad.

=== Juan Aurich ===
After spending two seasons with Alianza Lima, Ramos moved to the once rival and winner of 2011 final Juan Aurich. As fate would have it, he would again find himself in the decisive finals of the 2014 season, where he again ended up in tear after Juan Aurich fell to his first club Sporting Cristal when Juan Aurich lost 2–3 in the third final. He scored one goal in the first final. He later participated in the 2015 Copa Libertadores, where he demonstrated his performance, notable against Argentine giant and later champions River Plate where he provided a good pass for teammate Marcos Delgado to score in an eventual 1–1 draw in El Monumental.

=== Club de Gimnasia y Esgrima La Plata ===
Argentina's Club de Gimnasia y Esgrima La Plata became the first foreign club Ramos played for, signing in 2016. He left after just a season in charge.

=== Emelec ===
With little opportunity in Argentina, Ramos signed for Ecuadorian giant Emelec as a loan, to replace for Gabriel Achilier who left for Mexico. However, he regained his position and became a frequent starter for the Ecuadorian side, helping the club to reach the round of sixteen in 2017 Copa Libertadores before losing to San Lorenzo de Almagro on penalty. Despite this impressive performance, he left the club by the end of the season.

=== Veracruz ===
Ramos joined C.D. Veracruz for the 2018–19 Liga MX season, where he joined compatriots Pedro Gallese, Carlos Cáceda and Wilder Cartagena. But with the club suffering financial turmoil, he left the club by mutual consent.

=== Al-Nassr ===
In July 2018, Ramos left Mexico for Saudi Arabia where he signed for Al-Nassr in the Saudi Professional League for the next two seasons with an option to a third year, the transfer was given for 5 million in exchange. However, his performance wasn't impressive, being used only in ten games.

=== Melgar ===
Ramos returned to Peru to play for FBC Melgar as a loan from the Saudi club.

=== Universitario ===
In summer 2019, Ramos came to play for Universitario de Deportes, where he arrived as a free player. He made his debut for the club facing Los Caimanes in the 2019 Copa Bicentenario, but was given a red card in just 34 minutes in the field. After an unimpressive demonstration in the club, even though the club still wanted him to stay playing, he left by mutual consent after just a season.

=== Universidad César Vallejo ===
Ramos signed for Club Deportivo Universidad César Vallejo in late 2019, where he was instrumental, once again, in helping the club to qualify for the 2021 Copa Libertadores.

== International career ==
Before Ramos came to pro in 2008, his talent allowed him to captain the Peru national under-17 football team when the country first hosted the 2005 FIFA U-17 World Cup, also the first youth World Cup Peru participated. He later participated in the 2007 South American U-20 Championship with the Peru national under-20 football team, but not successful.

With these experiences and good performance in club level, he was called up into the national team of Peru, first for the failed 2010 World Cup qualifiers where he debuted against Venezuela in a 1–3 away defeat. He was included in 2011 Copa América, where he played well and helped Peru to obtain third place, even though he only played in three matches. He became a regular member in the country's yet another failed 2014 World Cup qualifiers. He presided over ongoing turmoil of the national team and appeared in a string of friendlies in 2014, where he would score his first international goal against Panama in Lima on 6 August, which Peru won 3–0.

He returned to the national team for the 2015 Copa América, where he only appeared in two games as Peru repeated its 2011 performance to win bronze. He also got into the national team in Copa América Centenario and appeared in all four games. He also got more permanent matches during the 2018 World Cup qualifiers, where he also scored his first goal in an official game, against Paraguay in a 4–1 away victory. His ongoing good form continued throughout the qualification and in the decisive home game playoff against New Zealand, he scored his third and the most important goal in his career, to give Peru a 2–0 win and the country's return to FIFA World Cup after 36 years.

In May 2018, he was named in Peru's provisional 24-man squad for the 2018 FIFA World Cup in Russia. He made into the final 23 in the 2018 FIFA World Cup, appeared in all three group stage games as Peru exited with one win and two defeats.

== Career statistics ==
As of played 29 March 2024

Appearances and goals by national team and year
National team	Year	Apps	Goals
Peru	2009	2	0
Peru	2010	3	0
Peru	2011	8	0
Peru	2012	10	0
Peru	2013	7	0
Peru	2014	7	1
Peru	2015	5	0
Peru	2016	13	1
Peru	2017	8	1
Peru	2018	12	0
Peru	2019	0	0
Peru	2020	0	0
Peru	2021	12	0
Peru	2022	2	0
Total		89	3

Scores and results list Peru's goal tally first, score column indicates score after each Ramos goal.

List of international goals scored by Christian Ramos
No.	Date	Venue	Opponent	Score	Result	Competition
1	6 August 2014	Estadio Nacional, Lima, Peru	Panama	3–0	3–0	Friendly
2	10 November 2016	Estadio Defensores del Chaco, Asunción, Paraguay	Paraguay	1–1	4–1	2018 FIFA World Cup qualification
3	15 November 2017	Estadio Nacional, Lima, Peru	New Zealand	2–0	2–0	2018 FIFA World Cup qualification (play-off)

== Honours ==
Universidad San Martín

- Torneo Descentralizado: 2010

Emelec

- 2017 Campeonato Ecuatoriano de Fútbol Serie A

Al-Nassr

- 2018–19 Saudi Pro League

Alianza Lima

- Peruvian Primera División: 2022

Peru

- Copa America bronze medal: 2011, 2015
