= 2018 FIFA World Cup qualification (AFC) =

Tournament details
- Dates: 12 March 2015 – 10 October 2017
- Teams: 45 (Note: Kuwait were disqualified after playing five matches. Indonesia were also disqualified before playing.) (from 1 confederation)

Tournament statistics
- Matches played: 223
- Goals scored: 665 (2.98 per match)
- Attendance: 4,377,585 (19,630 per match)
- Top scorer(s): (Saudi Arabia) Mohammad Al-Sahlawi (Note: This player's goal tally includes one or more goals which the player scored in matches that were subsequently forfeited, but which FIFA still continued to count in its statistics.) (United Arab Emirates) Ahmed Khalil (16 goals each)

The Asian section of the 2018 FIFA World Cup qualification acted as qualifiers for the 2018 FIFA World Cup, held in Russia, for national teams which were members of the Asian Football Confederation (AFC). 4.5 slots (four direct slots and one inter-confederation play-off slot) in the final tournament were available for AFC teams.

On 16 April 2014, the AFC Executive Committee approved a proposal to merge the preliminary qualification rounds of the FIFA World Cup and the AFC Asian Cup, which expanded to 24 teams starting in 2019. Therefore, the first two rounds of the FIFA World Cup qualifiers also acted as qualifiers for the 2019 AFC Asian Cup in the United Arab Emirates.

== Format ==
The qualification structure was as follows:

- First round: 12 teams (ranked 35–46) played home-and-away over two legs. The six winners advanced to the second round.
- Second round: 40 teams (ranked 1–34 and six first round winners) were divided into eight groups of five teams to play home-and-away round-robin matches. The eight group winners and the four best group runners-up advanced to the third round of FIFA World Cup qualification.
- Third round: 12 teams (an increase from ten for 2014) which had advanced from the second round were divided into two groups of six teams to play home-and-away round-robin matches. The top two teams of each group qualified for the 2018 FIFA World Cup, and the two third-placed teams advanced to the fourth round.
- Fourth round: Two third-placed teams of each group from the third round played home-and-away over two legs. The winners advanced to the inter-confederation play-offs.

== Entrants ==
The 46 FIFA-affiliated nations from the AFC entered qualification. In order to determine which nations would compete in the first round and which nations would receive a bye through to the second round, the FIFA World Rankings of January 2015 were used (shown in parentheses), as those were the latest published rankings prior to the first round draw. The FIFA Rankings of January 2015 were also used for seeding of the first round draw; however, for seeding in the second round and third round draws, the most recent FIFA Rankings prior to those draws were used.

This was the first effective participation of Bhutan, the country registered for the qualifications of 2010 but withdrew without playing a game (initially drawn against Kuwait in the first round).

From the January 2015 FIFA World Rankings
Bye to the second round (Ranked 1st to 34th)	Competing in first round (Ranked 35th to 46th)
1. Iran (51); 2. Japan (54); 3. South Korea (69); 4. Uzbekistan (71); 5. United Arab Emirates (80); 6. Qatar (92); 7. Oman (93); 8. Jordan (93); 9. China (96); 10. Australia (100); 11. Saudi Arabia (102); 12. Bahrain (110); 13. Iraq (114); 14. Palestine (115); 15. Lebanon (122); 16. Kuwait (125); 17. Philippines (129); 18. Maldives (131); 19. Vietnam (133); 20. Tajikistan (136); 21. Myanmar (141); 22. Afghanistan (142); 23. Thailand (144); 24. Turkmenistan (147); 25. North Korea (150); 26. Syria (151); 27. Kyrgyzstan (152); 28. Malaysia (154); 29. Hong Kong (156); 30. Singapore (157); 31. Indonesia (159); 32. Laos (160); 33. Guam (161); 34. Bangladesh (165)	35. India (171); 36. Sri Lanka (172); 37. Yemen (176); 38. Cambodia (179); 39. Chinese Taipei (182); 40. Timor-Leste (185); 41. Nepal (186); 42. Macau (186); 43. Pakistan (188); 44. Mongolia (194); 45. Brunei (198); 46. Bhutan (209)

== Schedule ==
The schedule of the competition was as follows.

Round	Matchday	Date
First round	First leg	12 March 2015
First round	Second leg	17 March 2015
Second round	Matchday 1	11 June 2015
Second round	Matchday 2	16 June 2015
Second round	Matchday 3	3 September 2015
Second round	Matchday 4	8 September 2015
Second round	Matchday 5	8 October 2015
Second round	Matchday 6	13 October 2015
Second round	Matchday 7	12 November 2015
Second round	Matchday 8	17 November 2015
Second round	Matchday 9	24 March 2016
Second round	Matchday 10	29 March 2016

Round	Matchday	Date
Third round	Matchday 1	1 September 2016
Third round	Matchday 2	6 September 2016
Third round	Matchday 3	6 October 2016
Third round	Matchday 4	11 October 2016
Third round	Matchday 5	15 November 2016
Third round	Matchday 6	23 March 2017
Third round	Matchday 7	28 March 2017
Third round	Matchday 8	13 June 2017
Third round	Matchday 9	31 August 2017
Third round	Matchday 10	5 September 2017
Fourth round	First leg	5 October 2017
Fourth round	Second leg	10 October 2017

== First round ==
The draw for the first round was held on 10 February 2015, 15:30 MST (UTC+8), at the AFC House in Kuala Lumpur, Malaysia.

Team 1	Agg.	Team 2	1st leg	2nd leg
India	2–0	Nepal	2–0	0–0
Yemen	3–1	Pakistan	3–1	0–0
Timor-Leste	5-1 (Note: On 12 December 2017, Timor-Leste were ordered by the AFC to forfeit both matches against Mongolia due to the use of falsified documents for their players.)	Mongolia	4–1	1–0
Cambodia	4–1	Macau	3–0	1–1
Chinese Taipei	2–1	Brunei	0–1	2–0
Sri Lanka	1–3	Bhutan	0–1	1–2

== Second round ==
The draw for the second round was held on 14 April 2015, at 17:00 MST (UTC+8), at the JW Marriott Hotel in Kuala Lumpur, Malaysia.

=== Summary ===
Qualified for the third round and Asian Cup (except United Arab Emirates) as winners or top four runners-up
Advanced to the Third Asian Cup qualifying round as bottom four runners-up, third place, or top four fourth placed team
Advanced to the AFC Asian Cup qualifying play-off round.
Denotes a team that was disqualified as a result of a FIFA suspension.

Group A	Group B	Group C	Group D	Group E	Group F	Group G	Group H
Saudi Arabia United Arab Emirates (Note: United Arab Emirates had already qualified as hosts of the 2019 AFC Asian Cup, so they were only competing for World Cup qualification.)	Australia	Qatar China	Iran	Japan Syria	Thailand Iraq	South Korea	Uzbekistan
Palestine	Jordan Kyrgyzstan	Hong Kong	Oman Turkmenistan Guam	Singapore Afghanistan	Vietnam	Lebanon Kuwait Myanmar	North Korea Philippines Bahrain
Malaysia Timor-Leste	Tajikistan Bangladesh	Maldives Bhutan	India	Cambodia	Chinese Taipei	Laos	Yemen
					Indonesia		

=== Groups ===
2018 FIFA World Cup qualification tiebreakers
In league format, the ranking of teams in each group was based on the following criteria (regulations Articles 20.6 and 20.7):
1. Points (3 points for a win, 1 point for a draw, 0 points for a loss)
2. Overall goal difference
3. Overall goals scored
4. Points in matches between tied teams
5. Goal difference in matches between tied teams
6. Goals scored in matches between tied teams
7. Away goals scored in matches between tied teams (if the tie was only between two teams in home-and-away league format)
8. Fair play points
  - first yellow card: minus 1 point
  - indirect red card (second yellow card): minus 3 points
  - direct red card: minus 4 points
  - yellow card and direct red card: minus 5 points
9. Drawing of lots by the FIFA Organising Committee

==== Group A ====
Pos	Team	Pld	W	D	L	GF	GA	GD	Pts	Qualification	Saudi Arabia	United Arab Emirates	Palestine	Malaysia	East Timor
1	Saudi Arabia	8	6	2	0	28	4	+24	20	World Cup qualifying third round and Asian Cup	—	2–1	3–2	2–0	7–0 (Note: On 12 December 2017, AFC decided to forfeit the first five matches involving Timor-Leste – both v Malaysia, home v United Arab Emirates, away v Saudi Arbia, and home v Palestine due to the use of falsified documents for their players of Timor-Leste.)
2	United Arab Emirates (Note: United Arab Emirates already qualified for the Asian Cup as the host nation.)	8	5	2	1	25	4	+21	17	World Cup qualifying third round	1–1	—	2–0	10–0	8–0
3	Palestine	8	3	3	2	22	6	+16	12	Asian Cup qualifying third round	0–0	0–0	—	6–0	7–0
4	Malaysia	8	1	1	6	4	29	−25	4	Asian Cup qualifying play-off round	0–3 (Note: Match abandoned after 87 minutes due to a group of supporters throwing flares at the pitch. A month later, FIFA awarded Saudi Arabia 3–0 win.)	1–2	0–6	—	1–1
5	Timor-Leste	8	0	2	6	2	36	−34	2	Asian Cup qualifying play-off round	0–10	0–1	1–1	0–1	—

==== Group B ====
Pos	Team	Pld	W	D	L	GF	GA	GD	Pts	Qualification	Australia	Jordan	Kyrgyzstan	Tajikistan	Bangladesh
1	Australia	8	7	0	1	29	4	+25	21	World Cup qualifying third round and Asian Cup	—	5–1	3–0	7–0	5–0
2	Jordan	8	5	1	2	21	7	+14	16	Asian Cup qualifying third round	2–0	—	0–0	3–0	8–0
3	Kyrgyzstan	8	4	2	2	10	8	+2	14	Asian Cup qualifying third round	1–2	1–0	—	2–2	2–0
4	Tajikistan	8	1	2	5	9	20	−11	5	Asian Cup qualifying play-off round	0–3	1–3	0–1	—	5–0
5	Bangladesh	8	0	1	7	2	32	−30	1	Asian Cup qualifying play-off round	0–4	0–4	1–3	1–1	—

==== Group C ====
Pos	Team	Pld	W	D	L	GF	GA	GD	Pts	Qualification	Qatar	People's Republic of China	Hong Kong	Maldives	Bhutan
1	Qatar	8	7	0	1	29	4	+25	21	World Cup qualifying third round and Asian Cup	—	1–0	2–0	4–0	15–0
2	China	8	5	2	1	27	1	+26	17	World Cup qualifying third round and Asian Cup	2–0	—	0–0	4–0	12–0
3	Hong Kong	8	4	2	2	13	5	+8	14	Asian Cup qualifying third round	2–3	0–0	—	2–0	7–0
4	Maldives	8	2	0	6	8	20	−12	6	Asian Cup qualifying play-off round	0–1	0–3	0–1	—	4–2
5	Bhutan	8	0	0	8	5	52	−47	0	Asian Cup qualifying play-off round	0–3	0–6	0–1	3–4	—

==== Group D ====
Pos	Team	Pld	W	D	L	GF	GA	GD	Pts	Qualification	Iran	Oman	Turkmenistan	Guam	India
1	Iran	8	6	2	0	26	3	+23	20	World Cup qualifying third round and Asian Cup	—	2–0	3–1	6–0	4–0
2	Oman	8	4	2	2	11	7	+4	14	Asian Cup qualifying third round	1–1	—	3–1	1–0	3–0
3	Turkmenistan	8	4	1	3	10	11	−1	13	Asian Cup qualifying third round	1–1	2–1	—	1–0	2–1
4	Guam	8	2	1	5	3	16	−13	7	Asian Cup qualifying third round	0–6	0–0	1–0	—	2–1
5	India	8	1	0	7	5	18	−13	3	Asian Cup qualifying play-off round	0–3 (Note: FIFA awarded Iran a 3–0 win as a result of India fielding the ineligible player Eugeneson Lyngdoh. The match initially ended 3–0 to Iran.)	1–2	1–2	1–0	—

==== Group E ====
Pos	Team	Pld	W	D	L	GF	GA	GD	Pts	Qualification	Japan	United Arab Republic	Singapore	Afghanistan	Cambodia
1	Japan	8	7	1	0	27	0	+27	22	World Cup qualifying third round and Asian Cup	—	5–0	0–0	5–0	3–0
2	Syria	8	6	0	2	26	11	+15	18	World Cup qualifying third round and Asian Cup	0–3	—	1–0	5–2	6–0
3	Singapore	8	3	1	4	9	9	0	10	Asian Cup qualifying third round	0–3	1–2	—	1–0	2–1
4	Afghanistan	8	3	0	5	8	24	−16	9	Asian Cup qualifying third round	0–6	0–6	2–1	—	3–0
5	Cambodia	8	0	0	8	1	27	−26	0	Asian Cup qualifying play-off round	0–2	0–6	0–4	0–1	—

==== Group F ====
Pos	Team	Pld	W	D	L	GF	GA	GD	Pts	Qualification	Thailand	Iraq	Vietnam	Chinese Taipei for Olympic games	Indonesia
1	Thailand	6	4	2	0	14	6	+8	14	World Cup qualifying third round and Asian Cup	—	2–2	1–0	4–2	Canc.
2	Iraq	6	3	3	0	13	6	+7	12	World Cup qualifying third round and Asian Cup	2–2	—	1–0	5–1	Canc.
3	Vietnam	6	2	1	3	7	8	−1	7	Asian Cup qualifying third round	0–3	1–1	—	4–1	Canc.
4	Chinese Taipei	6	0	0	6	5	19	−14	0	Asian Cup qualifying play-off round	0–2	0–2	1–2	—	Canc.
5	Indonesia (Note: Indonesia was also drawn into this group, but on 30 May 2015 the country's football association was suspended due to governmental interference, and on 3 June 2015 the team was disqualified and all matches involving it were cancelled.)	0	0	0	0	0	0	0	0	Disqualified	Canc.	Canc.	Canc.	Canc.	—

==== Group G ====
Pos	Team	Pld	W	D	L	GF	GA	GD	Pts	Qualification	South Korea	Lebanon	Kuwait	Myanmar	Laos
1	South Korea	8	8	0	0	27	0	+27	24	World Cup qualifying third round and Asian Cup	—	1–0	3–0 (Note: During this stage the Kuwait Football Association was suspended after the country had failed to comply with a decision from FIFA that its sports law had to be changed. The three remaining matches involving Kuwait – away v Myanmar, home v Laos, and away v South Korea – were not played as scheduled, and were eventually awarded as 3–0 wins for Kuwait's opponents. Kuwait was also unable to compete in the Third round of the Asian Cup qualifying, to which it would have advanced based on its ranking.)	4–0	8–0
2	Lebanon	8	3	2	3	12	6	+6	11	Asian Cup qualifying third round	0–3	—	0–1	1–1	7–0
3	Kuwait	8	3	1	4	12	10	+2	10	Disqualified	0–1	0–0	—	9–0	0–3
4	Myanmar	8	2	2	4	9	21	−12	8	Asian Cup qualifying third round	0–2	0–2	3–0	—	3–1
5	Laos	8	1	1	6	6	29	−23	4	Asian Cup qualifying play-off round	0–5	0–2	0–2	2–2	—

==== Group H ====
Pos	Team	Pld	W	D	L	GF	GA	GD	Pts	Qualification	Uzbekistan	North Korea	Philippines	Bahrain	Yemen
1	Uzbekistan	8	7	0	1	20	7	+13	21	World Cup qualifying third round and Asian Cup	—	3–1	1–0	1–0	1–0
2	North Korea	8	5	1	2	14	8	+6	16	Asian Cup qualifying third round	4–2	—	0–0	2–0	1–0
3	Philippines	8	3	1	4	8	12	−4	10	Asian Cup qualifying third round	1–5	3–2	—	2–1	0–1
4	Bahrain	8	3	0	5	10	10	0	9	Asian Cup qualifying third round	0–4	0–1	2–0	—	3–0
5	Yemen	8	1	0	7	2	17	−15	3	Asian Cup qualifying play-off round	1–3	0–3 (Note: FIFA awarded North Korea a 3–0 win as a result of Yemen fielding the ineligible player Mudir Al-Radaei, after North Korea had defeated Yemen 1–0. Al-Radaei failed to serve an automatic one match suspension for receiving two yellow cards earlier in the First round of the competition.)	0–2	0–4	—

=== Ranking of runner-up teams ===
To determine the four best runner-up teams, the following criteria were used:

1. Points (3 points for a win, 1 point for a draw, 0 points for a loss)
2. Goal difference
3. Goals scored
4. Fair play points
5. Drawing of lots

As a result of Indonesia being disqualified due to FIFA suspension, Group F contained only four teams compared to five teams in all other groups. Therefore, the results against the fifth-placed team were not counted when determining the ranking of the runner-up teams.

Pos	Grp	Team	Pld	W	D	L	GF	GA	GD	Pts	Qualification
1	F	Iraq	6	3	3	0	13	6	+7	12	World Cup qualifying third round and Asian Cup
2	E	Syria	6	4	0	2	14	11	+3	12	World Cup qualifying third round and Asian Cup
3	A	United Arab Emirates (Note: United Arab Emirates already qualified for the Asian Cup as the host nation.)	6	3	2	1	16	4	+12	11	World Cup qualifying third round
4	C	China	6	3	2	1	9	1	+8	11	World Cup qualifying third round and Asian Cup
5	H	North Korea	6	3	1	2	10	8	+2	10	Asian Cup qualifying third round
6	B	Jordan	6	3	1	2	9	7	+2	10	Asian Cup qualifying third round
7	D	Oman	6	2	2	2	6	6	0	8	Asian Cup qualifying third round
8	G	Lebanon	6	1	2	3	3	6	−3	5	Asian Cup qualifying third round

Source: FIFA
Rules for classification: Counting only matches against teams ranked first to fourth in the group, 1) Points; 2) Goal difference; 3) Goals scored; 4) Fair play points; 5) Drawing of lots.

== Third round ==
The third round consisted of two groups of six teams. The first two teams in each group qualified for the 2018 FIFA World Cup. The two third-placed teams proceeded to the fourth round.

The draw for the third round was held on 12 April 2016, at 16:30 MST (UTC+8), at the Mandarin Oriental Hotel in Kuala Lumpur, Malaysia.

=== Groups ===
2018 FIFA World Cup qualification tiebreakers
In league format, the ranking of teams in each group was based on the following criteria (regulations Articles 20.6 and 20.7):
1. Points (3 points for a win, 1 point for a draw, 0 points for a loss)
2. Overall goal difference
3. Overall goals scored
4. Points in matches between tied teams
5. Goal difference in matches between tied teams
6. Goals scored in matches between tied teams
7. Away goals scored in matches between tied teams (if the tie was only between two teams in home-and-away league format)
8. Fair play points
  - first yellow card: minus 1 point
  - indirect red card (second yellow card): minus 3 points
  - direct red card: minus 4 points
  - yellow card and direct red card: minus 5 points
9. Drawing of lots by the FIFA Organising Committee

==== Group A ====
Pos	Team	Pld	W	D	L	GF	GA	GD	Pts	Qualification	Iran	South Korea	United Arab Republic	Uzbekistan	People's Republic of China	Qatar
1	Iran	10	6	4	0	10	2	+8	22	2018 FIFA World Cup	—	1–0	2–2	2–0	1–0	2–0
2	South Korea	10	4	3	3	11	10	+1	15	2018 FIFA World Cup	0–0	—	1–0	2–1	3–2	3–2
3	Syria	10	3	4	3	9	8	+1	13	Fourth round	0–0	0–0	—	1–0	2–2	3–1
4	Uzbekistan	10	4	1	5	6	7	−1	13		0–1	0–0	1–0	—	2–0	1–0
5	China	10	3	3	4	8	10	−2	12		0–0	1–0	0–1	1–0	—	0–0
6	Qatar	10	2	1	7	8	15	−7	7		0–1	3–2	1–0	0–1	1–2	—

Source: FIFA

==== Group B ====
Pos	Team	Pld	W	D	L	GF	GA	GD	Pts	Qualification	Japan	Saudi Arabia	Australia	United Arab Emirates	Iraq	Thailand
1	Japan	10	6	2	2	17	7	+10	20	2018 FIFA World Cup	—	2–1	2–0	1–2	2–1	4–0
2	Saudi Arabia	10	6	1	3	17	10	+7	19	2018 FIFA World Cup	1–0	—	2–2	3–0	1–0	1–0
3	Australia	10	5	4	1	16	11	+5	19	Fourth round	1–1	3–2	—	2–0	2–0	2–1
4	United Arab Emirates	10	4	1	5	10	13	−3	13		0–2	2–1	0–1	—	2–0	3–1
5	Iraq	10	3	2	5	11	12	−1	11		1–1	1–2	1–1	1–0	—	4–0
6	Thailand	10	0	2	8	6	24	−18	2		0–2	0–3	2–2	1–1	1–2	—

Source: FIFA

== Fourth round ==
The two third-placed teams in each group from the third round played against each other home-and-away over two legs to determine which team advanced to the inter-confederation play-offs.

The order of legs was announced during the draw for the third round. Syria played their home match, as with all their home matches in the third round, in Malaysia due to the war time condition in Syria.

Team 1	Agg.	Team 2	1st leg	2nd leg
Syria	2–3	Australia	1–1	1–2 (a.e.t.)

== Inter-confederation play-offs ==
The draw for the inter-confederation play-offs was held as part of the 2018 FIFA World Cup Preliminary Draw on 25 July 2015, starting 18:00 MSK (UTC+3), at the Konstantinovsky Palace in Strelna, Saint Petersburg. The fifth-placed team from AFC was drawn against the fourth-placed team from CONCACAF, with the AFC team hosting the second leg.

Team 1	Agg.	Team 2	1st leg	2nd leg
Honduras	1–3	Australia	0–0	1–3

== Qualified teams ==
The following five teams from AFC qualified for the final tournament.

Team	Qualified as	Qualified on	Previous appearances in FIFA World Cup^{1}
Iran	Third round group A winners	12 June 2017	4 (1978, 1998, 2006, 2014)
Japan	Third round group B winners	31 August 2017	5 (1998, 2002, 2006, 2010, 2014)
South Korea	Third round group A runners-up	5 September 2017	9 (1954, 1986, 1990, 1994, 1998, 2002, 2006, 2010, 2014)
Saudi Arabia	Third round group B runners-up	5 September 2017	4 (1994, 1998, 2002, 2006)
Australia	CONCACAF v AFC play-off winners	15 November 2017	4 (1974^{2}, 2006^{2}, 2010, 2014)

^{1} Italic indicates hosts for that year.
^{2} Australia qualified as a member of the OFC in 1974 and 2006 (qualifying took place until 2005 and they left the OFC and joined the AFC in 2006).

== Top goalscorers ==
There were 665 goals scored in 223 matches, for an average of 2.98 goals per match.

16 goals

- (Saudi Arabia) Mohammad Al-Sahlawi
- (United Arab Emirates) Ahmed Khalil

11 goals

- (Australia) Tim Cahill
- (Iran) Sardar Azmoun

10 goals

- (Syria) Omar Kharbin

9 goals

- (Qatar) Hassan Al-Haydos
- (United Arab Emirates) Ali Mabkhout

8 goals

- (China) Yang Xu
- (Iran) Mehdi Taremi

7 goals

- (Australia) Mile Jedinak
- (China) Yu Dabao
- (Japan) Keisuke Honda
- (South Korea) Son Heung-min

6 goals

- (Australia) Tom Rogic
- (Iraq) Mohannad Abdul-Raheem
- (Japan) Shinji Kagawa
- (Jordan) Hamza Al-Dardour
- (Saudi Arabia) Taisir Al-Jassim
- (Syria) Mahmoud Al-Mawas
- (Tajikistan) Manuchekhr Dzhalilov

Below are full goalscorer lists for each round:

- First round
- Second round
- Third round
- Fourth round

== See also ==
- 2019 AFC Asian Cup qualification
