= Jacobo Kouffati =

Venezuelan footballer (born 1993)

Personal information
- Full name: Jacobo Salvador Kouffati
- Date of birth: 30 July 1993 (age 33)
- Place of birth: Maturín, Venezuela
- Height: 1.70 m (5 ft 7 in)
- Position: Midfielder

Team information
- Current team: Deportivo Lara

Senior career*
| Years | Team | Apps | (Gls) |
| 2010–2013 | Monagas | 59 | (1) |
| 2013–2014 | Trujillanos | 6 | (1) |
| 2014–2015 | Petare | 29 | (2) |
| 2015 | ACD Lara | 15 | (7) |
| 2016–2018 | Cuenca | 30 | (6) |
| 2017 | → Millonarios (loan) | 14 | (2) |
| 2018 | → Xinjiang Tianshan Leopard (loan) | 9 | (1) |
| 2019 | Deportes Iquique | 15 | (1) |
| 2020 | Deportivo Táchira | 12 | (0) |
| 2021 | Mushuc Runa | 24 | (3) |
| 2022 | Orense | 23 | (2) |
| 2023 | Deportivo Binacional | 5 | (0) |
| 2024 | Monagas | 17 | (3) |
| 2026- | Deportivo Lara | ? | (?) |

International career^{‡}
| 2016-2017 | Venezuela | 5 | (1) |
- * Club domestic league appearances and goals as of 21:50, 02 May 2021 (UTC). ‡ National team caps and goals as of 13:05, 09 June 2017 (UTC)

Jacobo Salvador Kouffati Agostini (Spanish pronunciation: [xaˈkoβo kuˈfati]; born 30 July 1993) is a Venezuelan association football player who plays as a midfielder. He currently plays for Deportivo Lara.

== Career ==
=== International career ===
He has been summoned several times to the work modules of the Venezuela national under-20 football team, and summoned to the list of "Good Faith" of the Venezuela National Team for the Copa América Centenario where he was discarded in the last Cut of the National Team (Rafael Dudamel).

However, he made a preparation tour with his team for that competition, which had an opportunity to play against the Galicia national football team on May 20, 2016, and against Panama on May 24, 2016.

=== International goals ===
Scores and results list Venezuela's goal tally first.

| Goal | Date | Venue | Opponent | Score | Result | Competition |
|---|---|---|---|---|---|---|
| 1. | 10 November 2016 | Estadio Monumental de Maturín, Maturín, Venezuela | Bolivia | 1–0 | 5–0 | 2018 FIFA World Cup qualification |
