= Gabriel Achilier =

Ecuadorian footballer (born 1985)

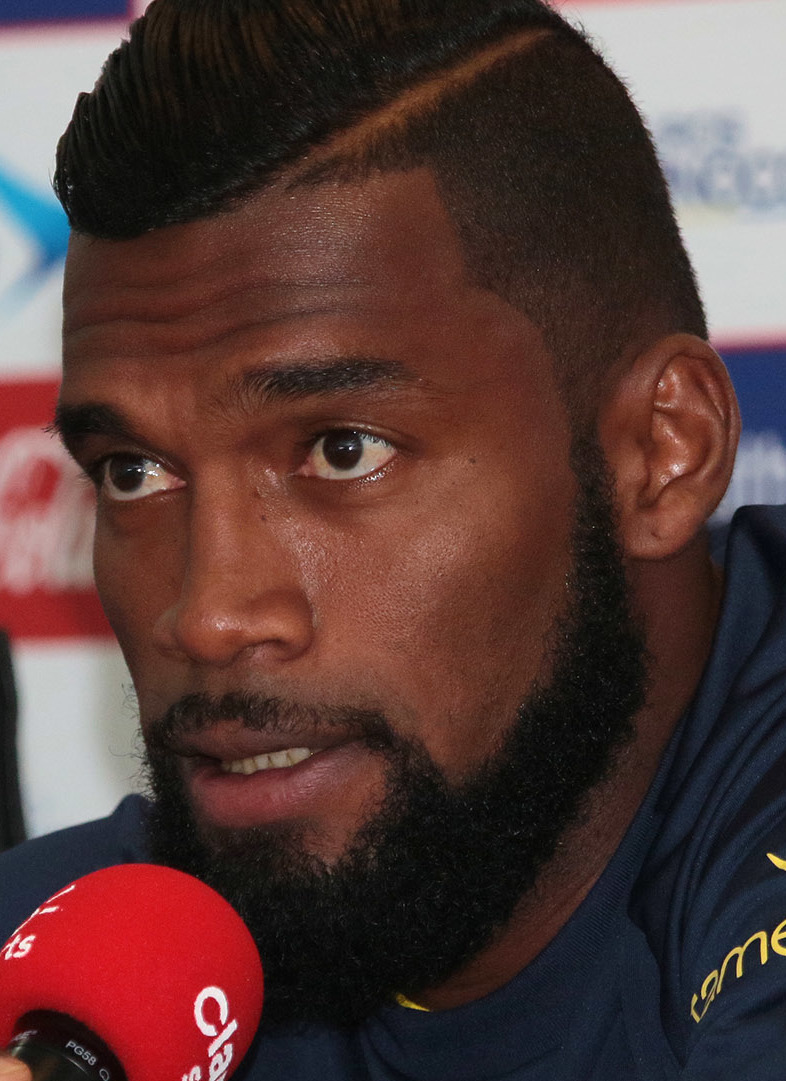
- Achilier with Ecuador in 2015

Personal information
- Full name: Gabriel Eduardo Achilier Zurita
- Date of birth: March 24, 1985 (age 41)
- Place of birth: Machala, Ecuador
- Height: 1.81 m (5 ft 11 in)
- Position: Centre-back

Team information
- Current team: Orense
- Number: 24

Senior career*
Years	Team	Apps	(Gls)
2002	CD Oro	17	(4)
2003	Deportivo Cuenca	0	(0)
2004–2006	LDU Loja	90	(1)
2007–2008	Deportivo Azogues	64	(1)
2009–2016	Emelec	276	(10)
2017–2020	Morelia	115	(4)
2021	Alianza Lima	0	(0)
2021	→ Orense (loan)	25	(4)
2022–	Orense	136	(9)

International career^{‡}
2008–2019	Ecuador	54	(1)
- * Club domestic league appearances and goals as of 20 August 2025 ‡ National team caps and goals as of 21 June 2019

Gabriel Eduardo Achilier Zurita (Spanish pronunciation: [ɡaˈβɾjel atʃiˈljeɾ]; born March 24, 1985) is an Ecuadorian professional footballer who plays as a centre-back for Orense.

== Club career ==
Born in Machala, Achilier began his professional career in Liga Deportiva Universitaria de Loja. There, he established himself as one of the growing, future defender of the national team. In 2004, he left to join Deportivo Azogues.

In Azogues, he began to make a name for himself through his marvelous performances. Achilier helped Azogues qualify for the 2007 Liguilla Final of Ecuador's Serie A. Azogues did not win the tournament but did good overall. In 2008, however, Achilier matured more in the game but Azogues had a horrible season. Azogues was last in the table and did not do well in the second fase either. As a result, Achilier and Azogues were relegated down to the second division.

In November 2008, Achilier became Emelec's first offseason reinforcement. He was loaned with an option to buy.

In December 2009, Club Sport Emelec enforced its option to buy over the player and signed him on a 5-year contract, because of his great performances as a "problem solver" for the manager, being able to play in several different positions of the pitch when needed.

== International career ==
Achilier was called up to represent Ecuador on May 27, 2008, against France.

=== International goals ===
Scores and results list Ecuador's goal tally first.

No	Date	Venue	Opponent	Score	Result	Competition
1.	6 September 2016	Estadio Nacional de Lima, Lima, Peru	Peru	1–1	1–2	2018 FIFA World Cup qualification

== Achievements ==
=== Club ===
CS Emelec

- Serie A: 2013, 2014, 2015

== Personal life ==
Achilier was married to Marly Romero and the pair had three children. In May 2016 Achilier's wife Romero was diagnosed with cancer, and on 23 January 2017 she died at Reina del Cisne clinic in the town of Piñas, El Oro province.
