= Valinhos (footballer) =

Brazilian footballer and manager

Personal information
- Full name: José Claudinei Georgini
- Date of birth: 15 December 1947 (age 78)
- Place of birth: Valinhos, Brazil

Senior career*
Years	Team	Apps	(Gls)
- Bonsucesso
- Vasco da Gama
- Olaria
- Goiás
- Portuguesa (RJ)
- Volta Redonda
- Serrano

Managerial career
- 1980: Fluminense Under-16
- 1980–1981: Al Wasl
- Vasco da Gama U20
- Al-Ahli (UAE)
- 1987–1989: Tawen SC
- Nova Cidade
- Botafogo
- Flamengo
- 2001: Brazil U17
- 2001–2003: Brazil U20
- 2008: Zimbabwe
- * Club domestic league appearances and goals

José Claudinei Georgini (born 15 December 1947) is a Brazilian football manager nicknamed Valinhos who last managed the Zimbabwe national team, a position he held from January to November 2008.

== Playing career ==
Valinhos had a brief playing career, playing between 1968 and 1979 with Bonsucesso, Vasco da Gama, Olaria, Goiás, Portuguesa (RJ), Volta Redonda and Serrano.

== Managerial career ==
He was coach of the Brazil under-20 side between 2001 and 2003 and has also coached in Brazil, the United Arab Emirates, Saudi Arabia, Kuwait and Morocco.

On 12 March 2015, Zimbabwe were expelled from the qualifying tournament for the 2018 FIFA World Cup for failing to pay Claudinei arrears owed.
