= 2019 Copa América knockout stage =

The knockout stage of the 2019 Copa América began on 27 June with the quarter-finals, and concluded on 7 July 2019 with the final, played at the Estádio do Maracanã in Rio de Janeiro.

All match times listed are local, BRT (UTC−3).

== Format ==
In the knockout stage, if a match was tied after 90 minutes:

- In the quarter-finals, extra time was not played, and the match was decided by a penalty shoot-out.
- In the semi-finals, third place play-off and final, extra time would be played (two periods of 15 minutes each), where each team was allowed to make a fourth substitution. If still tied after extra time, the match would be decided by a penalty shoot-out.

CONMEBOL set out the following matchups for the quarter-finals:

- Match 1: Winners Group A vs 3rd Group B/C
- Match 2: Runners-up Group A vs Runners-up Group B
- Match 3: Winners Group B vs Runners-up Group C
- Match 4: Winners Group C vs 3rd Group A/B

=== Combinations of matches in the quarter-finals ===
The specific match-ups involving the third-placed teams depended on which two third-placed teams qualified for the quarter-finals:

Combination according to the two qualified teams

Third-placed teams qualify from groups			1A vs	1C vs
A	B		3B	3A
A		C	3C	3A
	B	C	3C	3B

== Qualified teams ==
The top two placed teams from each of the three groups, along with the two best-placed third teams, qualified for the knockout stage.

Group	Winners	Runners-up	Third-placed teams (Best two qualify)
A	Brazil	Venezuela	Peru
B	Colombia	Argentina	Paraguay
C	Uruguay	Chile	—N/a

== Bracket ==
Quarter-finals
27 June – Porto Alegre
Brazil (p)	0 (4)
Paraguay	0 (3)
28 June – Rio de Janeiro
Venezuela	0
Argentina	2
28 June – São Paulo (A. Corinthians)
Colombia	0 (4)
Chile (p)	0 (5)
29 June – Salvador
Uruguay	0 (4)
Peru (p)	0 (5)

Semi-finals
2 July – Belo Horizonte
Brazil	2
Argentina	0
3 July – Porto Alegre
Chile	0
Peru	3

Final
7 July – Rio de Janeiro
Brazil	3
Peru	1
Third place play-off
6 July – São Paulo (A. Corinthians)
Argentina	2
Chile	1

== Quarter-finals ==
=== Brazil vs Paraguay ===
27 June 2019
21:30

Brazil	0–0	Paraguay
	Report
Penalties
Willian (penalty scored); Marquinhos (penalty scored); Coutinho (penalty scored); Firmino (penalty missed); Gabriel Jesus (penalty scored)	4–3	(penalty missed) Gómez; (penalty scored) Almirón; (penalty scored) Valdez; (penalty scored) R. Rojas; (penalty missed) González

Arena do Grêmio, Porto Alegre
Attendance: 44,902
Referee: Roberto Tobar (Chile)

Brazil	Paraguay

GK	1	Alisson
RB	13	Dani Alves (c)		(substituted off) 85'
CB	4	Marquinhos
CB	2	Thiago Silva
LB	6	Filipe Luís	(yellow card) 44'	(substituted off) 46'
CM	8	Arthur	(yellow card) 84'
CM	15	Allan		(substituted off) 71'
RW	9	Gabriel Jesus
AM	11	Philippe Coutinho
LW	19	Everton
CF	20	Roberto Firmino	(yellow card) 47'
Substitutions:
DF	12	Alex Sandro		(substituted on) 46'
MF	10	Willian		(substituted on) 71'
MF	18	Lucas Paquetá		(substituted on) 85'
Manager:
Tite

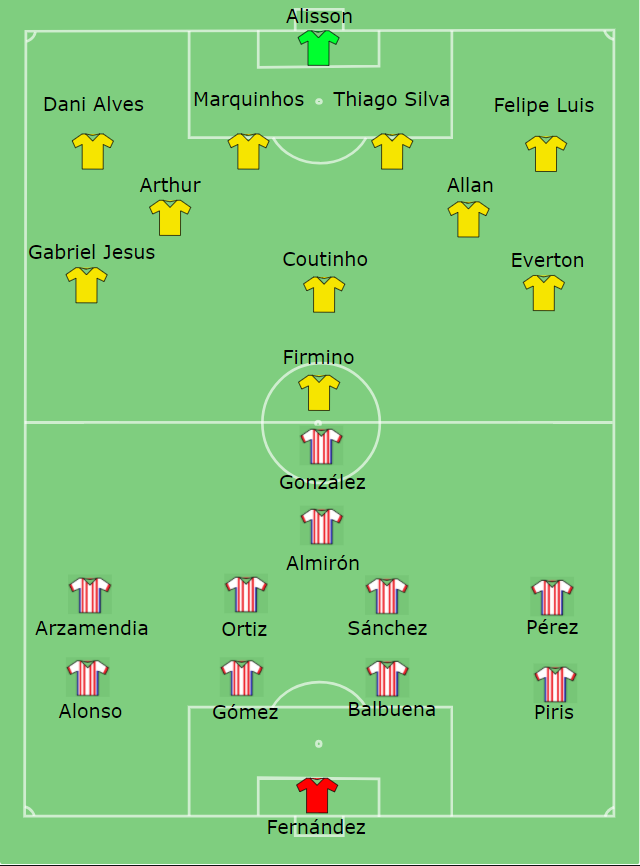
Brazil vs Paraguay, 2019 Copa América quarter-final

GK	12	Gatito Fernández
CB	15	Gustavo Gómez (c)
CB	4	Fabián Balbuena	(red card) 58'
CB	13	Júnior Alonso	(yellow card) 37'
RWB	2	Iván Piris	(yellow card) 34'
LWB	18	Santiago Arzamendia	(yellow card) 30'	(substituted off) 61'
RM	17	Hernán Pérez		(substituted off) 74'
CM	6	Richard Sánchez		(substituted off) 78'
CM	16	Celso Ortiz
LM	23	Miguel Almirón
CF	10	Derlis González
Substitutions:
DF	5	Bruno Valdez		(substituted on) 61'
MF	8	Rodrigo Rojas		(substituted on) 74'
DF	3	Juan Escobar		(substituted on) 78'
Manager:
(Argentina) Eduardo Berizzo

Man of the Match:
Gatito Fernández (Paraguay)

Assistant referees:
Christian Schiemann (Chile)
Claudio Ríos (Chile)
Fourth official:
Roddy Zambrano (Ecuador)
Video assistant referee:
Julio Bascuñán (Chile)
Assistant video assistant referees:
Piero Maza (Chile)
Nicolás Taran (Uruguay)

=== Venezuela vs Argentina ===
28 June 2019
16:00

Venezuela	0–2	Argentina
	Report	Martínez 10'; Lo Celso 74'

Estádio do Maracanã, Rio de Janeiro
Attendance: 50,094
Referee: Wilmar Roldán (Colombia)

Venezuela	Argentina

GK	1	Wuilker Faríñez
RB	20	Ronald Hernández
CB	4	Jhon Chancellor
CB	14	Luis Mago		(substituted off) 55'
LB	16	Roberto Rosales		(substituted off) 82'
DM	5	Júnior Moreno
RM	15	Jhon Murillo
CM	8	Tomás Rincón (c)	(yellow card) 11'
CM	6	Yangel Herrera	(yellow card) 15'
LM	7	Darwin Machís		(substituted off) 70'
CF	23	Salomón Rondón	(yellow card) 43'
Substitutions:
MF	18	Yeferson Soteldo	(yellow card) 90+4'	(substituted on) 55'
FW	17	Josef Martínez		(substituted on) 70'
MF	13	Luis Manuel Seijas		(substituted on) 82'
Manager:
Rafael Dudamel

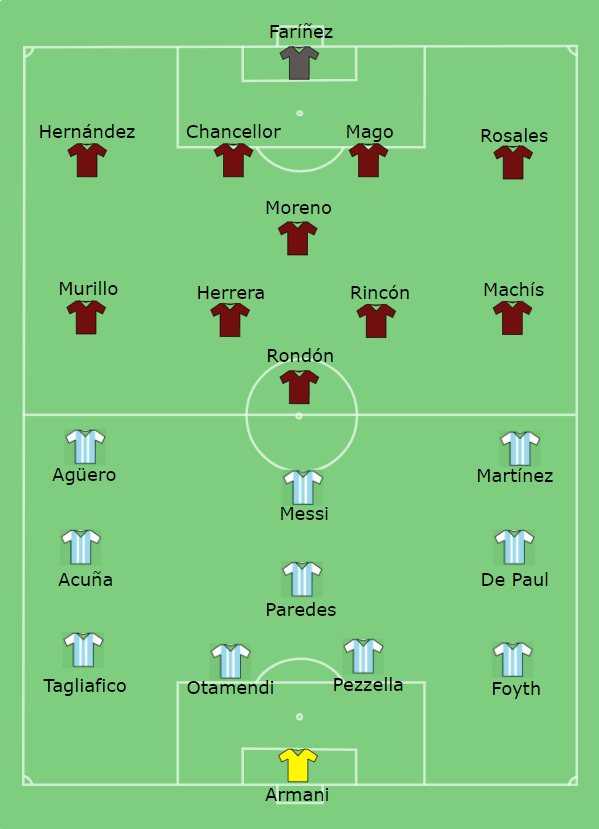

GK	1	Franco Armani
RB	2	Juan Foyth
CB	6	Germán Pezzella
CB	17	Nicolás Otamendi
LB	3	Nicolás Tagliafico
CM	16	Rodrigo De Paul
CM	5	Leandro Paredes
CM	8	Marcos Acuña	(yellow card) 41'	(substituted off) 67'
AM	10	Lionel Messi (c)
CF	22	Lautaro Martínez	(yellow card) 15'	(substituted off) 63'
CF	9	Sergio Agüero		(substituted off) 84'
Substitutions:
MF	11	Ángel Di María		(substituted on) 63'
MF	20	Giovani Lo Celso		(substituted on) 67'
FW	21	Paulo Dybala		(substituted on) 84'
Manager:
Lionel Scaloni

Man of the Match:
Lautaro Martínez (Argentina)

Assistant referees:
Alexander Guzmán (Colombia)
Jhon Alexander León (Colombia)
Fourth official:
Diego Haro (Peru)
Video assistant referee:
Andrés Rojas (Colombia)
Assistant video assistant referees:
Nicolás Gallo (Colombia)
Richard Trinidad (Uruguay)

=== Colombia vs Chile ===
28 June 2019
20:20 (Note: Match started 20 minutes late because the Chile team bus got stuck in traffic.)

Colombia	0–0	Chile
	Report
Penalties
Rodríguez (penalty scored); Cardona (penalty scored); Cuadrado (penalty scored); Mina (penalty scored); Tesillo (penalty missed)	4–5	(penalty scored) Vidal; (penalty scored) Vargas; (penalty scored) Pulgar; (penalty scored) Aránguiz; (penalty scored) Sánchez

Arena Corinthians, São Paulo
Attendance: 44,062
Referee: Néstor Pitana (Argentina)

Colombia	Chile

GK	1	David Ospina
RB	3	Stefan Medina	(yellow card) 43'
CB	13	Yerry Mina
CB	23	Davinson Sánchez
LB	6	William Tesillo
CM	11	Juan Cuadrado	(yellow card) 69'
CM	5	Wílmar Barrios
CM	15	Mateus Uribe		(substituted off) 66'
RF	10	James Rodríguez	(yellow card) 87'
CF	9	Radamel Falcao (c)		(substituted off) 76'
LF	20	Roger Martínez		(substituted off) 80'
Substitutions:
MF	8	Edwin Cardona		(substituted on) 66'
FW	7	Duván Zapata		(substituted on) 76'
FW	14	Luis Díaz		(substituted on) 80'
Manager:
(Portugal) Carlos Queiroz

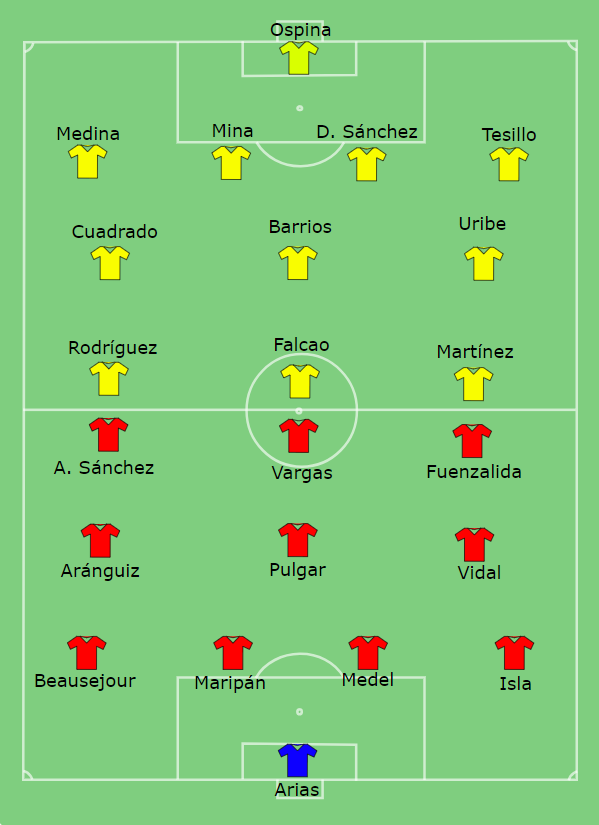

GK	1	Gabriel Arias
RB	4	Mauricio Isla
CB	17	Gary Medel (c)
CB	3	Guillermo Maripán
LB	15	Jean Beausejour
CM	8	Arturo Vidal	(yellow card) 58'
CM	13	Erick Pulgar
CM	20	Charles Aránguiz	(yellow card) 7'
RF	6	José Pedro Fuenzalida		(substituted off) 74'
CF	11	Eduardo Vargas
LF	7	Alexis Sánchez
Substitutions:
MF	14	Esteban Pavez		(substituted on) 74'
Manager:
(Colombia) Reinaldo Rueda

Man of the Match:
Arturo Vidal (Chile)

Assistant referees:
Hernán Maidana (Argentina)
Juan Pablo Belatti (Argentina)
Fourth official:
Anderson Daronco (Brazil)
Video assistant referee:
Fernando Rapallini (Argentina)
Assistant video assistant referees:
Gery Vargas (Colombia)
Ezequiel Brailovsky (Argentina)

=== Uruguay vs Peru ===
29 June 2019
16:00

Uruguay	0–0	Peru
	Report
Penalties
Suárez (penalty missed); Cavani (penalty scored); Stuani (penalty scored); Bentancur (penalty scored); Torreira (penalty scored)	4–5	(penalty scored) Guerrero; (penalty scored) Ruidíaz; (penalty scored) Yotún; (penalty scored) Advíncula; (penalty scored) Flores

Itaipava Arena Fonte Nova, Salvador
Attendance: 21,180
Referee: Wilton Sampaio (Brazil)

Uruguay	Peru

GK	1	Fernando Muslera
RB	4	Giovanni González
CB	2	José Giménez
CB	3	Diego Godín (c)	(yellow card) 32'
LB	22	Martín Cáceres
RM	8	Nahitan Nández		(substituted off) 56'
CM	15	Federico Valverde	(yellow card) 69'	(substituted off) 90+6'
CM	6	Rodrigo Bentancur
LM	10	Giorgian De Arrascaeta
CF	21	Edinson Cavani
CF	9	Luis Suárez
Substitutions:
MF	14	Lucas Torreira		(substituted on) 56'
FW	11	Cristhian Stuani		(substituted on) 90+6'
Manager:
Óscar Tabárez

GK	1	Pedro Gallese
RB	17	Luis Advíncula
CB	2	Luis Abram
CB	15	Carlos Zambrano	(yellow card) 48'
LB	6	Miguel Trauco
CM	19	Yoshimar Yotún
CM	13	Renato Tapia
RW	18	André Carrillo		(substituted off) 74'
AM	8	Christian Cueva	(yellow card) 63'	(substituted off) 84'
LW	20	Edison Flores
CF	9	Paolo Guerrero (c)
Substitutions:
MF	23	Christofer Gonzáles		(substituted on) 74'
FW	11	Raúl Ruidíaz		(substituted on) 84'
Manager:
(Argentina) Ricardo Gareca

Man of the Match:
Pedro Gallese (Peru)

Assistant referees:
Kléber Gil (Brazil)
Rodrigo Correa (Brazil)
Fourth official:
Arnaldo Samaniego (Paraguay)
Video assistant referee:
Patricio Loustau (Argentina)
Assistant video assistant referees:
Jesús Valenzuela (Venezuela)
Eduardo Cardozo (Paraguay)

== Semi-finals ==
=== Brazil vs Argentina ===
2 July 2019
21:30

Brazil	2–0	Argentina
Gabriel Jesus 19'; Firmino 71'	Report

Estádio Mineirão, Belo Horizonte
Attendance: 55,947
Referee: Roddy Zambrano (Ecuador)

Brazil	Argentina

GK	1	Alisson
RB	13	Dani Alves (c)	(yellow card) 40'
CB	4	Marquinhos		(substituted off) 64'
CB	2	Thiago Silva
LB	12	Alex Sandro
CM	8	Arthur
CM	5	Casemiro
RW	9	Gabriel Jesus		(substituted off) 80'
AM	11	Philippe Coutinho
LW	19	Everton		(substituted off) 46'
CF	20	Roberto Firmino
Substitutions:
MF	10	Willian		(substituted on) 46'
DF	3	Miranda		(substituted on) 64'
MF	15	Allan	(yellow card) 82'	(substituted on) 80'
Manager:
Tite

GK	1	Franco Armani
RB	2	Juan Foyth	(yellow card) 56'
CB	6	Germán Pezzella
CB	17	Nicolás Otamendi
LB	3	Nicolás Tagliafico	(yellow card) 9'	(substituted off) 85'
CM	16	Rodrigo De Paul		(substituted off) 67'
CM	5	Leandro Paredes
CM	8	Marcos Acuña	(yellow card) 40'	(substituted off) 59'
AM	10	Lionel Messi (c)
CF	9	Sergio Agüero	(yellow card) 90+4'
CF	22	Lautaro Martínez	(yellow card) 58'
Substitutions:
MF	11	Ángel Di María		(substituted on) 59'
MF	20	Giovani Lo Celso		(substituted on) 67'
FW	21	Paulo Dybala		(substituted on) 85'
Manager:
Lionel Scaloni			(yellow card) 75'

Man of the Match:
Dani Alves (Brazil)

Assistant referees:
Christian Lescano (Ecuador)
Byron Romero (Ecuador)
Fourth official:
Esteban Ostojich (Uruguay)
Video assistant referee:
Leodán González (Uruguay)
Assistant video assistant referees:
Jesús Valenzuela (Venezuela)
Nicolás Tarán (Uruguay)

=== Chile vs Peru ===
3 July 2019
21:30

Chile	0–3	Peru
	Report	Flores 21'; Yotún 38'; Guerrero 90+1'

Arena do Grêmio, Porto Alegre
Attendance: 33,058
Referee: Wilmar Roldán (Colombia)

Chile	Peru

GK	1	Gabriel Arias
RB	4	Mauricio Isla
CB	17	Gary Medel (c)
CB	3	Guillermo Maripán		(substituted off) 89'
LB	15	Jean Beausejour
CM	8	Arturo Vidal
CM	13	Erick Pulgar	(yellow card) 74'
CM	20	Charles Aránguiz
RF	6	José Fuenzalida		(substituted off) 46'
CF	11	Eduardo Vargas
LF	7	Alexis Sánchez
Substitutions:
FW	22	Ángelo Sagal	(yellow card) 86'	(substituted on) 46'
FW	9	Nicolás Castillo		(substituted on) 89'
Manager:
(Colombia) Reinaldo Rueda

GK	1	Pedro Gallese
RB	17	Luis Advíncula	(yellow card) 72'
CB	15	Carlos Zambrano
CB	2	Luis Abram
LB	6	Miguel Trauco
CM	13	Renato Tapia
CM	19	Yoshimar Yotún
RW	18	André Carrillo		(substituted off) 71'
AM	8	Christian Cueva		(substituted off) 80'
LW	20	Edison Flores		(substituted off) 50'
CF	9	Paolo Guerrero (c)
Substitutions:
MF	23	Christofer Gonzáles		(substituted on) 50'
FW	14	Andy Polo		(substituted on) 71'
MF	7	Josepmir Ballón		(substituted on) 80'
Manager:
(Argentina) Ricardo Gareca

Man of the Match:
Pedro Gallese (Peru)

Assistant referees:
Alexander Guzmán (Colombia)
Wilmar Navarro (Colombia)
Fourth official:
Mario Díaz de Vivar (Paraguay)
Video assistant referee:
Andrés Rojas (Colombia)
Assistant video assistant referees:
Nicolás Gallo (Colombia)
Jhon Alexander León (Colombia)

== Third place play-off ==
6 July 2019
16:00

Argentina	2–1	Chile
Agüero 12'; Dybala 22'	Report	Vidal 59' (pen.)

Arena Corinthians, São Paulo
Attendance: 44,269
Referee: Mario Díaz de Vivar (Paraguay)

Argentina	Chile

GK	1	Franco Armani
RB	2	Juan Foyth	(yellow card) 78'
CB	6	Germán Pezzella
CB	17	Nicolás Otamendi
LB	3	Nicolás Tagliafico	(yellow card) 90+2'
CM	16	Rodrigo De Paul
CM	5	Leandro Paredes	(yellow card) 62'
CM	20	Giovani Lo Celso	(yellow card) 57'	(substituted off) 89'
AM	10	Lionel Messi (c)	(red card) 36'
CF	21	Paulo Dybala		(substituted off) 66'
CF	9	Sergio Agüero		(substituted off) 80'
Substitutions:
MF	11	Ángel Di María		(substituted on) 66'
FW	19	Matías Suárez		(substituted on) 80'
DF	13	Ramiro Funes Mori		(substituted on) 89'
Manager:
Lionel Scaloni

GK	1	Gabriel Arias
CB	17	Gary Medel (c)	(red card) 36'
CB	18	Gonzalo Jara		(substituted off) 49'
CB	5	Paulo Díaz
DM	13	Erick Pulgar	(yellow card) 45'
CM	20	Charles Aránguiz		(substituted off) 82'
CM	8	Arturo Vidal	(yellow card) 25'
RW	4	Mauricio Isla
LW	15	Jean Beausejour	(yellow card) 15'
CF	7	Alexis Sánchez		(substituted off) 16'
CF	11	Eduardo Vargas
Substitutions:
FW	19	Júnior Fernándes		(substituted on) 16'
DF	3	Guillermo Maripán		(substituted on) 49'
FW	9	Nicolás Castillo		(substituted on) 82'
Manager:
(Colombia) Reinaldo Rueda

Man of the Match:
Paulo Dybala (Argentina)

Assistant referees:
Eduardo Cardozo (Paraguay)
Darío Gaona (Paraguay)
Fourth official:
Gery Vargas (Bolivia)
Video assistant referee:
Diego Haro (Peru)
Assistant video assistant referees:
Andrés Rojas (Colombia)
Jonny Bossio (Peru)

== Final ==
7 July 2019
17:00

Brazil	3–1	Peru
Everton 15'; Gabriel Jesus 45+3'; Richarlison 90' (pen.)	Report	Guerrero 44' (pen.)

Estádio do Maracanã, Rio de Janeiro
Attendance: 69,968
Referee: Roberto Tobar (Chile)

Brazil	Peru

GK	1	Alisson
RB	13	Dani Alves (c)
CB	4	Marquinhos
CB	2	Thiago Silva	(yellow card) 53'
LB	12	Alex Sandro
CM	8	Arthur
CM	5	Casemiro
RW	9	Gabriel Jesus	(yellow card) 30' (yellow-red card) 70'
AM	11	Philippe Coutinho		(substituted off) 77'
LW	19	Everton		(substituted off) 90+3'
CF	20	Roberto Firmino		(substituted off) 75'
Substitutions:
FW	21	Richarlison	(yellow card) 90+1'	(substituted on) 75'
DF	14	Éder Militão		(substituted on) 77'
MF	15	Allan		(substituted on) 90+3'
Manager:
Tite

GK	1	Pedro Gallese
RB	17	Luis Advíncula	(yellow card) 84'
CB	15	Carlos Zambrano	(yellow card) 68'
CB	2	Luis Abram
LB	6	Miguel Trauco
CM	13	Renato Tapia	(yellow card) 49'	(substituted off) 82'
CM	19	Yoshimar Yotún		(substituted off) 78'
RW	20	Edison Flores
AM	8	Christian Cueva
LW	18	André Carrillo		(substituted off) 86'
CF	9	Paolo Guerrero (c)
Substitutions:
FW	11	Raúl Ruidíaz		(substituted on) 78'
MF	23	Christofer Gonzáles		(substituted on) 82'
FW	14	Andy Polo		(substituted on) 86'
Manager:
(Argentina) Ricardo Gareca

Man of the Match:
Everton (Brazil)

Assistant referees:
Christian Schiemann (Chile)
Claudio Ríos (Chile)
Fourth official:
Alexis Herrera (Venezuela)
Video assistant referee:
Julio Bascuñán (Chile)
Assistant video assistant referees:
Nicolás Gallo (Colombia)
Alexander Guzmán (Colombia)
