= 2019 Copa América =

46th edition of the Copa América

CONMEBOL Copa América Brasil 2019
- Vibra o Continente (Vibra el Continente); English: Rocking the Continent

Tournament details
- Host country: Brazil
- Dates: 14 June – 7 July
- Teams: 12 (from 2 confederations)
- Venues: 6 (in 5 host cities)

Final positions
- Champions: Brazil (9th title)
- Runners-up: Peru
- Third place: Argentina
- Fourth place: Chile

Tournament statistics
- Matches played: 26
- Goals scored: 60 (2.31 per match)
- Attendance: 867,245 (33,356 per match)
- Top scorer(s): (Brazil) Everton (Peru) Paolo Guerrero (3 goals each)
- Best player: (Brazil) Dani Alves
- Best goalkeeper: (Brazil) Alisson
- Fair play award: Brazil

The 2019 Copa América was the 46th edition of the Copa América, the international men's association football championship organized by South America's football ruling body CONMEBOL. It was held in Brazil and took place between 14 June and 7 July 2019 at 6 venues across the country. This was the first time since 1991 where no CONCACAF nation took part in the tournament.

Heading into the tournament, Chile were the two-time defending champions, having won the 2015 and 2016 editions of the tournament, but were eliminated by Peru in the semi-finals leading to the third place match against Argentina, which they also lost.

Host nation Brazil won their ninth title by defeating Peru 3–1 in the final. Argentina took third place by beating Chile 2–1 in the third-place match.

== Host country ==
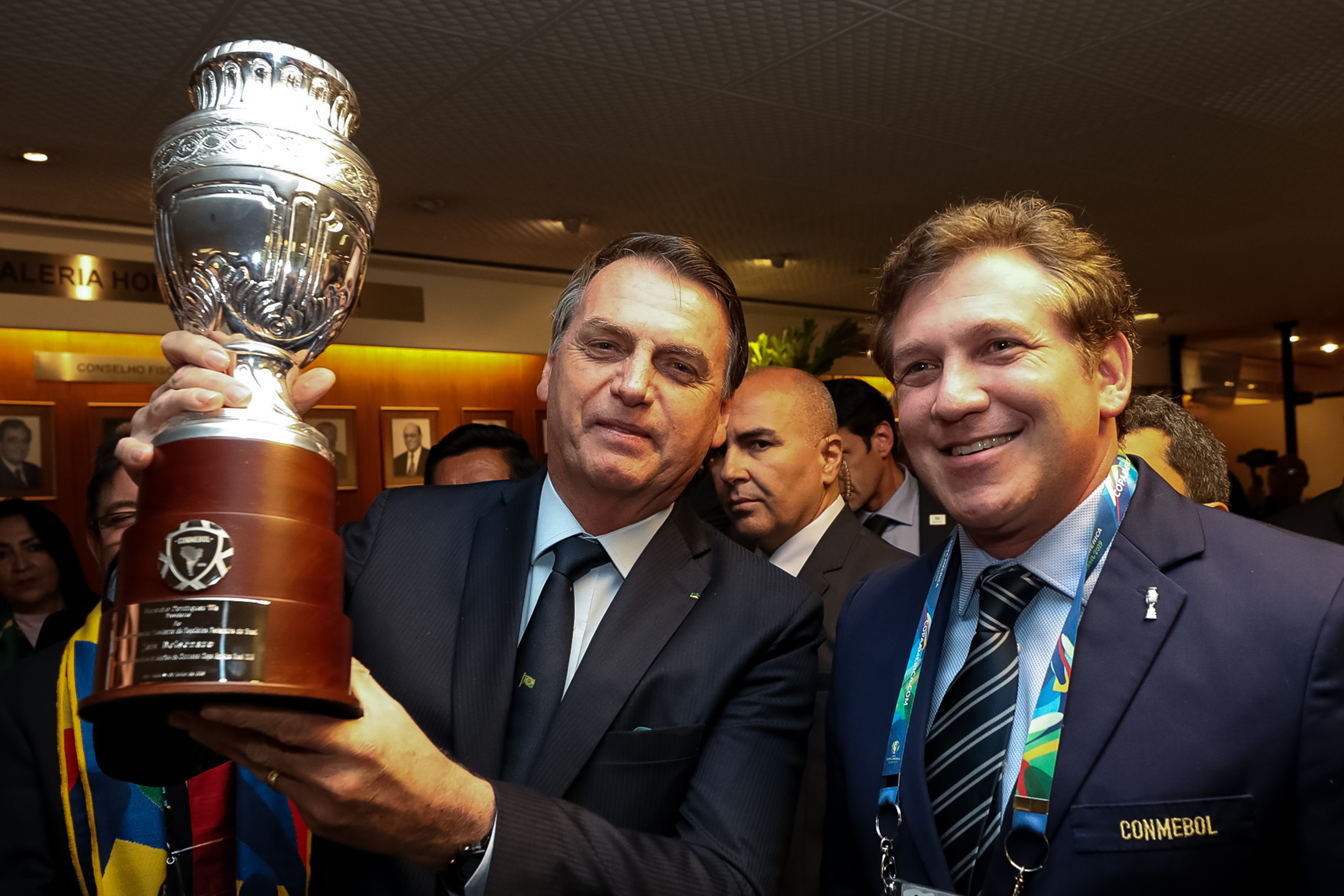
Brazilian president Jair Bolsonaro lifts the Copa América replica trophy.

Originally, the 2019 Copa América was to be hosted by Chile, while Brazil was due to host the 2015 Copa América, because CONMEBOL normally rotates tournament host nations in alphabetical order. However, because Brazil hosted the 2013 FIFA Confederations Cup, the 2014 FIFA World Cup, and the 2016 Summer Olympics, Brazil decided against also hosting the 2015 Copa América. Brazil's and Chile's football federations agreed to swap their host nation order for the 2015 and 2019 championships, and CONMEBOL approved this agreement in 2012.

Starting in 2021 (originally scheduled for 2020), Copa América will be held in the same years as the UEFA European Championship.

== Venues ==
On 14 June 2018, CBF Vice President Fernando Sarney announced that five cities would host the tournament: Salvador, Rio de Janeiro, São Paulo, Belo Horizonte and Porto Alegre. The list of stadia was decided on 17 September 2018. The opening match was held at the Estádio do Morumbi in São Paulo, the semi-finals were held at the Arena do Grêmio in Porto Alegre and Estádio Mineirão in Belo Horizonte, and the final was held at the Estádio do Maracanã in Rio de Janeiro. On 23 November 2018, CONMEBOL announced that the second São Paulo venue would be changed from the Allianz Parque to Arena Corinthians.

Rio de Janeiro	São Paulo		Location of the host cities of the 2019 Copa América.
Estádio do Maracanã	Estádio do Morumbi	Arena Corinthians	Location of the host cities of the 2019 Copa América.
Capacity: 74,738	Capacity: 67,428	Capacity: 49,205	Location of the host cities of the 2019 Copa América.
Belo Horizonte	Porto Alegre	Salvador	Location of the host cities of the 2019 Copa América.
Estádio Mineirão	Arena do Grêmio	Itaipava Arena Fonte Nova	Location of the host cities of the 2019 Copa América.
Capacity: 58,170	Capacity: 55,662	Capacity: 51,900	Location of the host cities of the 2019 Copa América.

== Teams ==
Apart from all ten CONMEBOL national teams which were eligible to enter, CONMEBOL initially planned to hold a 16-team tournament by inviting six teams from outside CONMEBOL, similar to the Copa América Centenario three years earlier. On 16 March 2018, CONMEBOL announced three teams from CONCACAF and three teams from the Asian Football Confederation (AFC) would be invited to participate in the 2019 Copa América. On 12 April 2018, it was announced that Qatar, the host of the 2022 FIFA World Cup, had accepted the invitation. On 4 May 2018, CONMEBOL announced that the tournament would instead be played with 12 teams, the same number as previous editions since 1993 (apart from the Copa América Centenario held in 2016), with the two guest teams being Qatar and Japan from the AFC. Both teams managed to reach the final of the 2019 AFC Asian Cup held in the UAE, which was won by Qatar.

Qatar made their debut appearance in the Copa América, becoming the first Arab nation to play in the tournament, while Japan made their second appearance, their first since 1999. This was also the first Copa América to not feature any team from CONCACAF since teams had been invited; in particular, Mexico, which competed in all ten editions since 1993 as an invited team, did not participate in this tournament. United States competed in four tournaments, including the 2016 event as host.

- Argentina
- Bolivia
- Brazil (hosts)
- Chile (title holders)
- Colombia
- Ecuador
- Japan (invitee)
- Paraguay
- Peru
- Qatar (invitee)
- Uruguay
- Venezuela

== Draw ==
The draw of the tournament took place on 24 January 2019, 20:30 BRST (UTC−2), at the Cidade das Artes in Rio de Janeiro, Brazil. The twelve teams were drawn into three groups of four, by selecting one team from each of the four ranked pots.

At the CONMEBOL Council meeting held on 23 November 2018, it was decided that FIFA Ranking would be the basis to determine the seeds and the distribution of the rest of teams in the pots of the draw. This decision will also be valid for future editions of the Copa America.

For the draw, the teams were allocated to four pots based on the FIFA World Ranking of December 2018 (shown in brackets). Pot 1 contained the hosts Brazil (who were automatically assigned to position A1) and the best two teams, pot 2 contained the next best three teams, and so on for pots 3 and 4. The teams from Pot 1 would be assigned to position 1 in their group, while the teams from Pots 2, 3 and 4 would be drawn to one of the positions 2, 3 or 4 in their group. The two guest teams, Japan and Qatar, which were seeded in different pots, could not be drawn in the same group.

Pot 1	Pot 2	Pot 3	Pot 4
Brazil (3) (hosts); Uruguay (7); Argentina (11)	Colombia (12); Chile (13); Peru (20)	Venezuela (31); Paraguay (32); Japan (50)	Ecuador (57); Bolivia (59); Qatar (93)

== Match officials ==
A total of 23 referees and 23 assistant referees were appointed for the tournament on 21 March 2019.

Association	Referees	Assistant referees
Argentina	Néstor Pitana; Fernando Rapallini; Patricio Loustau	Hernán Maidana; Juan Pablo Belatti; Ezequiel Brailovsky
Bolivia	Gery Vargas	José Antelo; Edwar Saavedra
Brazil	Wilton Sampaio; Raphael Claus; Anderson Daronco	Rodrigo Correa; Marcelo Van Gasse; Kléber Gil
Chile	Roberto Tobar; Julio Bascuñán; Piero Maza	Christian Schiemann; Claudio Ríos
Colombia	Wilmar Roldán; Andrés Rojas; Nicolás Gallo	Alexander Guzmán; Wilmar Navarro; Jhon Alexander León
Ecuador	Roddy Zambrano; Carlos Orbe	Christian Lescano; Byron Romero
Paraguay	Mario Díaz de Vivar; Arnaldo Samaniego	Eduardo Cardozo; Darío Gaona
Peru	Diego Haro; Víctor Hugo Carrillo	Jonny Bossio; Víctor Ráez
Uruguay	Esteban Ostojich; Leodán González	Nicolás Tarán; Richard Trinidad
Venezuela	Alexis Herrera; Jesús Valenzuela	Carlos López; Luis Murillo

== Squads ==
Each team had to submit a list of 23 players (three of whom had to be goalkeepers).

== Group stage ==
The match schedule was announced on 18 December 2018. The winners and runners-up of each group and the two best third-placed teams among all groups advanced to the quarter-finals.

Schedule
Matchday	Dates	Matches
Matchday 1	14–17 June 2019	1 v 2, 3 v 4
Matchday 2	18–21 June 2019	1 v 3, 2 v 4
Matchday 3	22–24 June 2019	4 v 1, 2 v 3

All times are local, BRT (UTC−3).

=== Tiebreakers ===
The ranking of teams in the group stage was determined as follows:

1. Points obtained in all group matches (three points for a win, one for a draw, none for a defeat);
2. Goal difference in all group matches;
3. Number of goals scored in all group matches;
4. Points obtained in the matches played between the teams in question;
5. Goal difference in the matches played between the teams in question;
6. Number of goals scored in the matches played between the teams in question;
7. Fair play points in all group matches (only one deduction could be applied to a player in a single match):
  - Yellow card: −1 points;
  - Indirect red card (second yellow card): −3 points;
  - Direct red card: −4 points;
  - Yellow card and direct red card: −5 points;
8. Drawing of lots.

=== Group A ===
Pos	Team	Pld	W	D	L	GF	GA	GD	Pts	Qualification
1	Brazil (H)	3	2	1	0	8	0	+8	7	Advance to knockout stage
2	Venezuela	3	1	2	0	3	1	+2	5	Advance to knockout stage
3	Peru	3	1	1	1	3	6	−3	4	Advance to knockout stage
4	Bolivia	3	0	0	3	2	9	−7	0	

Source: CONMEBOL
(H) Hosts
14 June 2019
21:30

Brazil	3–0	Bolivia
Coutinho 50' (pen.), 53'; Everton 85'	Report

Estádio do Morumbi, São Paulo
Attendance: 47,260
Referee: Néstor Pitana (Argentina)
15 June 2019
16:00

Venezuela	0–0	Peru
	Report

Arena do Grêmio, Porto Alegre
Attendance: 13,370
Referee: Wilmar Roldán (Colombia)

18 June 2019
18:30

Bolivia	1–3	Peru
Moreno 28' (pen.)	Report	Guerrero 45'; Farfán 55'; Flores 90+6'

Estádio do Maracanã, Rio de Janeiro
Attendance: 26,346
Referee: Roddy Zambrano (Ecuador)
18 June 2019
21:30

Brazil	0–0	Venezuela
	Report

Itaipava Arena Fonte Nova, Salvador
Attendance: 42,587
Referee: Julio Bascuñán (Chile)

22 June 2019
16:00

Peru	0–5	Brazil
	Report	Casemiro 12'; Firmino 19'; Everton 32'; Dani Alves 53'; Willian 90'

Arena Corinthians, São Paulo
Attendance: 42,317
Referee: Fernando Rapallini (Argentina)
22 June 2019
16:00

Bolivia	1–3	Venezuela
Justiniano 82'	Report	Machís 2', 55'; Martínez 86'

Estádio Mineirão, Belo Horizonte
Attendance: 8,091
Referee: Esteban Ostojich (Uruguay)

=== Group B ===
Pos	Team	Pld	W	D	L	GF	GA	GD	Pts	Qualification
1	Colombia	3	3	0	0	4	0	+4	9	Advance to knockout stage
2	Argentina	3	1	1	1	3	3	0	4	Advance to knockout stage
3	Paraguay	3	0	2	1	3	4	−1	2	Advance to knockout stage
4	Qatar	3	0	1	2	2	5	−3	1	

Source: CONMEBOL
15 June 2019
19:00

Argentina	0–2	Colombia
	Report	Martínez 71'; D. Zapata 86'

Itaipava Arena Fonte Nova, Salvador
Attendance: 35,572
Referee: Roberto Tobar (Chile)
16 June 2019
16:00

Paraguay	2–2	Qatar
Cardozo 4' (pen.); González 56'	Report	Ali 68'; R. Rojas 77' (o.g.)

Estádio do Maracanã, Rio de Janeiro
Attendance: 19,196
Referee: Diego Haro (Peru)

19 June 2019
18:30

Colombia	1–0	Qatar
D. Zapata 86'	Report

Estádio do Morumbi, São Paulo
Attendance: 22,079
Referee: Alexis Herrera (Venezuela)
19 June 2019
21:30

Argentina	1–1	Paraguay
Messi 57' (pen.)	Report	Sánchez 37'

Estádio Mineirão, Belo Horizonte
Attendance: 35,265
Referee: Wilton Sampaio (Brazil)

23 June 2019
16:00

Qatar	0–2	Argentina
	Report	Martínez 4'; Agüero 82'

Arena do Grêmio, Porto Alegre
Attendance: 41,390
Referee: Julio Bascuñán (Chile)
23 June 2019
16:00

Colombia	1–0	Paraguay
Cuéllar 31'	Report

Itaipava Arena Fonte Nova, Salvador
Attendance: 13,903
Referee: Víctor Carrillo (Peru)

=== Group C ===
Pos	Team	Pld	W	D	L	GF	GA	GD	Pts	Qualification
1	Uruguay	3	2	1	0	7	2	+5	7	Advance to knockout stage
2	Chile	3	2	0	1	6	2	+4	6	Advance to knockout stage
3	Japan	3	0	2	1	3	7	−4	2	
4	Ecuador	3	0	1	2	2	7	−5	1	

Source: CONMEBOL
16 June 2019
19:00

Uruguay	4–0	Ecuador
Lodeiro 6'; Cavani 33'; Suárez 44'; Mina 78' (o.g.)	Report

Estádio Mineirão, Belo Horizonte
Attendance: 13,611
Referee: Anderson Daronco (Brazil)
17 June 2019
20:00

Japan	0–4	Chile
	Report	Pulgar 41'; Vargas 54', 83'; Sánchez 82'

Estádio do Morumbi, São Paulo
Attendance: 23,253
Referee: Mario Díaz de Vivar (Paraguay)

20 June 2019
20:00

Uruguay	2–2	Japan
Suárez 32' (pen.); Giménez 66'	Report	Miyoshi 25', 59'

Arena do Grêmio, Porto Alegre
Attendance: 39,733
Referee: Andrés Rojas (Colombia)
21 June 2019
20:00

Ecuador	1–2	Chile
E. Valencia 26' (pen.)	Report	Fuenzalida 8'; Sánchez 51'

Itaipava Arena Fonte Nova, Salvador
Attendance: 14,727
Referee: Patricio Loustau (Argentina)

24 June 2019
20:00

Chile	0–1	Uruguay
	Report	Cavani 82'

Estádio do Maracanã, Rio de Janeiro
Attendance: 57,442
Referee: Raphael Claus (Brazil)
24 June 2019
20:00

Ecuador	1–1	Japan
Mena 35'	Report	Nakajima 15'

Estádio Mineirão, Belo Horizonte
Attendance: 7,623
Referee: Jesús Valenzuela (Venezuela)

=== Ranking of third-placed teams ===
Pos	Grp	Team	Pld	W	D	L	GF	GA	GD	Pts	Qualification
1	A	Peru	3	1	1	1	3	6	−3	4	Advance to knockout stage
2	B	Paraguay	3	0	2	1	3	4	−1	2	Advance to knockout stage
3	C	Japan	3	0	2	1	3	7	−4	2	

Source: CONMEBOL
Rules for classification: 1) Points; 2) Goal difference; 3) Goals scored; 4) Drawing of lots.

== Knockout stage ==
In the knockout stage, if a match was tied after 90 minutes:

- In the quarter-finals, extra time was not played, and the match was decided by a penalty shoot-out.
- In the semi-finals, third place play-off and final, extra time could be played, where a fourth substitute would be allowed for each team. If still tied after extra time, the match was decided by a penalty shoot-out.

=== Bracket ===
Quarter-finals
27 June – Porto Alegre
Brazil (p)	0 (4)
Paraguay	0 (3)
28 June – Rio de Janeiro
Venezuela	0
Argentina	2
28 June – São Paulo (A. Corinthians)
Colombia	0 (4)
Chile (p)	0 (5)
29 June – Salvador
Uruguay	0 (4)
Peru (p)	0 (5)

Semi-finals
2 July – Belo Horizonte
Brazil	2
Argentina	0
3 July – Porto Alegre
Chile	0
Peru	3

Final
7 July – Rio de Janeiro
Brazil	3
Peru	1
Third place play-off
6 July – São Paulo (A. Corinthians)
Argentina	2
Chile	1

=== Quarter-finals ===
27 June 2019
21:30

Brazil	0–0	Paraguay
	Report
Penalties
Willian (penalty scored); Marquinhos (penalty scored); Coutinho (penalty scored); Firmino (penalty missed); Gabriel Jesus (penalty scored)	4–3	(penalty missed) Gómez; (penalty scored) Almirón; (penalty scored) Valdez; (penalty scored) R. Rojas; (penalty missed) González

Arena do Grêmio, Porto Alegre
Attendance: 44,902
Referee: Roberto Tobar (Chile)

28 June 2019
16:00

Venezuela	0–2	Argentina
	Report	Martínez 10'; Lo Celso 74'

Estádio do Maracanã, Rio de Janeiro
Attendance: 50,094
Referee: Wilmar Roldán (Colombia)

28 June 2019
20:20 (Note: Match started 20 minutes late because the Chile team bus got stuck in traffic.)

Colombia	0–0	Chile
	Report
Penalties
Rodríguez (penalty scored); Cardona (penalty scored); Cuadrado (penalty scored); Mina (penalty scored); Tesillo (penalty missed)	4–5	(penalty scored) Vidal; (penalty scored) Vargas; (penalty scored) Pulgar; (penalty scored) Aránguiz; (penalty scored) Sánchez

Arena Corinthians, São Paulo
Attendance: 44,062
Referee: Néstor Pitana (Argentina)

29 June 2019
16:00

Uruguay	0–0	Peru
	Report
Penalties
Suárez (penalty missed); Cavani (penalty scored); Stuani (penalty scored); Bentancur (penalty scored); Torreira (penalty scored)	4–5	(penalty scored) Guerrero; (penalty scored) Ruidíaz; (penalty scored) Yotún; (penalty scored) Advíncula; (penalty scored) Flores

Itaipava Arena Fonte Nova, Salvador
Attendance: 21,180
Referee: Wilton Sampaio (Brazil)

=== Semi-finals ===
2 July 2019
21:30

Brazil	2–0	Argentina
Gabriel Jesus 19'; Firmino 71'	Report

Estádio Mineirão, Belo Horizonte
Attendance: 55,947
Referee: Roddy Zambrano (Ecuador)

3 July 2019
21:30

Chile	0–3	Peru
	Report	Flores 21'; Yotún 38'; Guerrero 90+1'

Arena do Grêmio, Porto Alegre
Attendance: 33,058
Referee: Wilmar Roldán (Colombia)

=== Third place play-off ===
6 July 2019
16:00

Argentina	2–1	Chile
Agüero 12'; Dybala 22'	Report	Vidal 59' (pen.)

Arena Corinthians, São Paulo
Attendance: 44,269
Referee: Mario Díaz de Vivar (Paraguay)

=== Final ===
7 July 2019
17:00

Brazil	3–1	Peru
Everton 15'; Gabriel Jesus 45+3'; Richarlison 90' (pen.)	Report	Guerrero 44' (pen.)

Estádio do Maracanã, Rio de Janeiro
Attendance: 69,968
Referee: Roberto Tobar (Chile)

== Statistics ==
=== Goalscorers ===
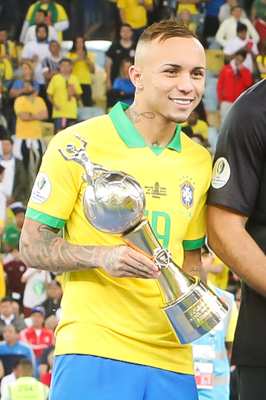
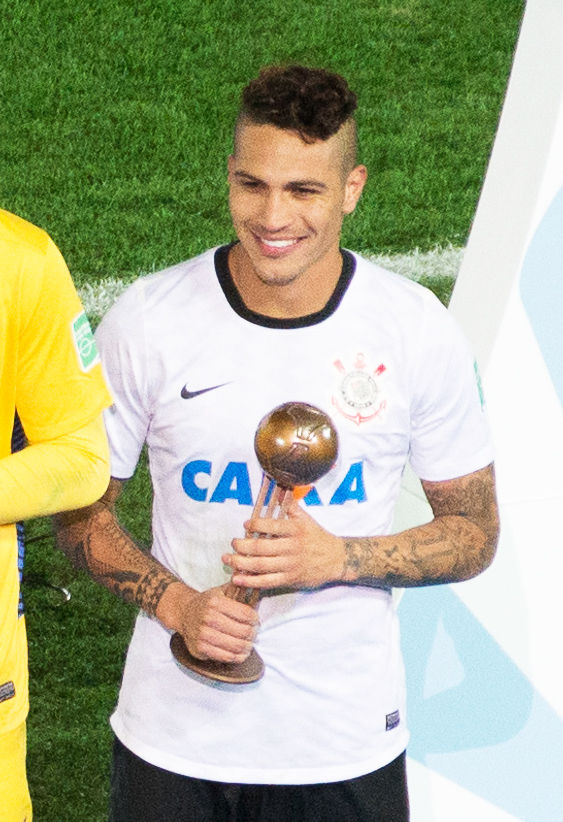
Everton (left) and Paolo Guerrero, top scorers

There were 60 goals scored in 26 matches, for an average of 2.31 goals per match.

3 goals

- (Brazil) Everton
- (Peru) Paolo Guerrero

2 goals

- (Argentina) Sergio Agüero
- (Argentina) Lautaro Martínez
- (Brazil) Gabriel Jesus
- (Brazil) Philippe Coutinho
- (Brazil) Roberto Firmino
- (Chile) Alexis Sánchez
- (Chile) Eduardo Vargas
- (Colombia) Duván Zapata
- (Japan) Koji Miyoshi
- (Peru) Edison Flores
- (Uruguay) Edinson Cavani
- (Uruguay) Luis Suárez
- (Venezuela) Darwin Machís

1 goal

- (Argentina) Paulo Dybala
- (Argentina) Giovani Lo Celso
- (Argentina) Lionel Messi
- (Bolivia) Leonel Justiniano
- (Bolivia) Marcelo Moreno
- (Brazil) Casemiro
- (Brazil) Dani Alves
- (Brazil) Richarlison
- (Brazil) Willian
- (Chile) José Pedro Fuenzalida
- (Chile) Erick Pulgar
- (Chile) Arturo Vidal
- (Colombia) Gustavo Cuéllar
- (Colombia) Roger Martínez
- (Ecuador) Ángel Mena
- (Ecuador) Enner Valencia
- (Japan) Shoya Nakajima
- (Paraguay) Óscar Cardozo
- (Paraguay) Derlis González
- (Paraguay) Richard Sánchez
- (Peru) Jefferson Farfán
- (Peru) Yoshimar Yotún
- (Qatar) Almoez Ali
- (Uruguay) José Giménez
- (Uruguay) Nicolás Lodeiro
- (Venezuela) Josef Martínez

1 own goal

- (Ecuador) Arturo Mina (against Uruguay)
- (Paraguay) Rodrigo Rojas (against Qatar)

=== Discipline ===
Player	Offence(s)	Suspension(s)
(Venezuela) Luis Mago	(yellow card) (yellow-red card) in Group A vs Peru (matchday 1; 15 June)	Group A vs Brazil (matchday 2; 18 June)
(Ecuador) José Quintero	(red card) in Group C vs Uruguay (matchday 1; 16 June)	Group C vs Chile (matchday 2; 21 June)
(Qatar) Assim Madibo	(yellow card) in Group B vs Paraguay (matchday 1; 16 June); (yellow card) in Group B vs Colombia (matchday 2; 19 June)	Group B vs Argentina (matchday 3; 23 June)
(Qatar) Abdelkarim Hassan	(yellow card) in Group B vs Paraguay (matchday 1; 16 June); (yellow card) in Group B vs Colombia (matchday 2; 19 June)	Group B vs Argentina (matchday 3; 23 June)
(Ecuador) Gabriel Achilier	(red card) in Group C vs Chile (matchday 2; 21 June)	Group C vs Japan (matchday 3; 24 June)
(Brazil) Casemiro	(yellow card) in Group A vs Venezuela (matchday 2; 18 June); (yellow card) in Group A vs Peru (matchday 3; 22 June)	Quarter-finals vs Paraguay (27 June)
(Paraguay) Fabián Balbuena	(red card) in Quarter-finals vs Brazil (27 June)	Suspension served outside the tournament
(Argentina) Marcos Acuña	(yellow card) in Quarter-finals vs Venezuela (28 June); (yellow card) in Semi-finals vs Brazil (2 July)	Third place play-off vs Chile (6 July)
(Argentina) Lautaro Martínez	(yellow card) in Quarter-finals vs Venezuela (28 June); (yellow card) in Semi-finals vs Brazil (2 July)	Third place play-off vs Chile (6 July)
(Argentina) Lionel Messi	(red card) in Third place play-off vs Chile (6 July)	Suspension served outside the tournament
(Chile) Gary Medel	(red card) in Third place play-off vs Argentina (6 July)	Suspension served outside the tournament
(Brazil) Gabriel Jesus	(yellow card) (yellow-red card) in Final vs Peru (7 July)	Suspension served outside the tournament

=== Winners ===
2019 Copa América champions

Brazil
9th title

=== Awards ===
The following awards were given at the conclusion of the tournament.

- Golden Ball Award: (Brazil) Dani Alves
- Golden Boot Award: (Brazil) Everton (3 goals) (Note: Paolo Guerrero also scored three goals throughout the tournament, but played more minutes than Everton.)
- Golden Glove Award: (Brazil) Alisson
- Fair Play Award: Brazil

=== Final Man of the Match Award ===
- (Brazil) Everton

=== Team of the Tournament ===
The Technical Study Group announced the tournament's Best XI squad.

Goalkeeper	Defenders	Midfielders	Forwards
(Brazil) Alisson	(Brazil) Dani Alves (Uruguay) José Giménez (Brazil) Thiago Silva (Peru) Miguel Trauco	(Brazil) Arthur (Argentina) Leandro Paredes (Chile) Arturo Vidal	(Colombia) James Rodríguez (Peru) Paolo Guerrero (Brazil) Everton

=== Final ranking ===
As per statistical convention in football, matches decided in extra time were counted as wins and losses, while matches decided by penalty shoot-out were counted as draws.

Pos	Team	Pld	W	D	L	GF	GA	GD	Pts	Final result
1	Brazil	6	4	2	0	13	1	+12	14	Champions
2	Peru	6	2	2	2	7	9	−2	8	Runners-up
3	Argentina	6	3	1	2	7	6	+1	10	Third place
4	Chile	6	2	1	3	7	7	0	7	Fourth place
5	Colombia	4	3	1	0	4	0	+4	10	Eliminated in Quarter-finals
6	Uruguay	4	2	2	0	7	2	+5	8	Eliminated in Quarter-finals
7	Venezuela	4	1	2	1	3	3	0	5	Eliminated in Quarter-finals
8	Paraguay	4	0	3	1	3	4	−1	3	Eliminated in Quarter-finals
9	Japan	3	0	2	1	3	7	−4	2	Eliminated in Group stage
10	Qatar	3	0	1	2	2	5	−3	1	Eliminated in Group stage
11	Ecuador	3	0	1	2	2	7	−5	1	Eliminated in Group stage
12	Bolivia	3	0	0	3	2	9	−7	0	Eliminated in Group stage

Source: CONMEBOL, technical report, p. 140

== Marketing ==
=== Mascot ===
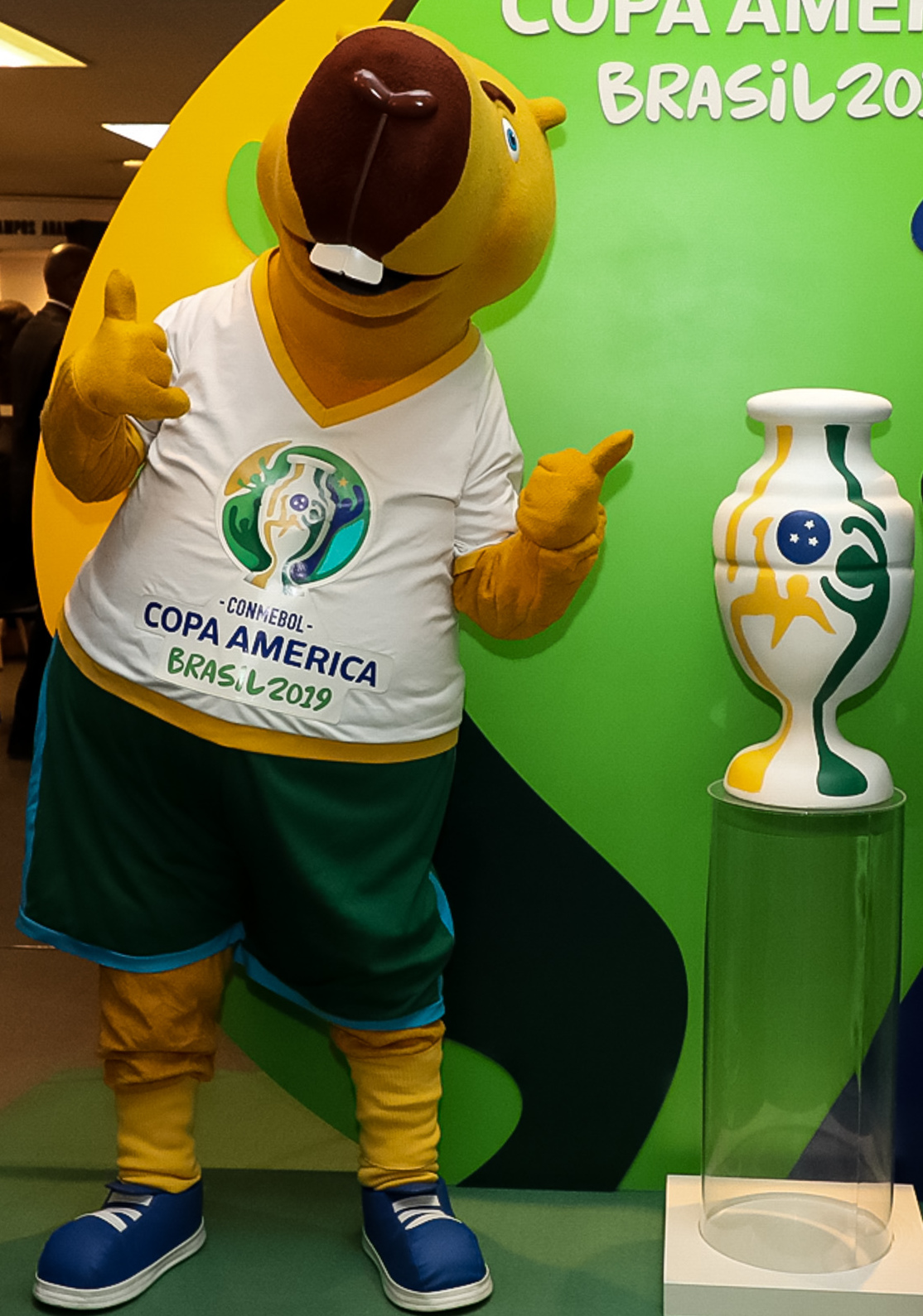
Zizito, mascot of the 2019 Copa América.

The mascot of the tournament was Zizito, a capybara whose name paid homage to Zizinho, the Brazilian footballer who shared the all-time goal-scoring record in the Copa América (17 goals) with Argentina's Norberto Doroteo Méndez.

=== Slogan ===
The slogan of the 2019 Copa América was "Vibra el Continente/Vibra o Continente" (Rocking the Continent).

=== Official song ===
"Vibra Continente" by Brazilian recording artist Léo Santana and Colombian recording artist Karol G served as an official song for the tournament.

== Broadcasting rights ==
=== CONMEBOL ===
Territory	Rights holder	Ref.
Argentina	TPA; TyC Sports	
Bolivia	Bolivia TV; Tigo Sports	
Brazil	Rede Globo; SporTV	
Chile	Canal 13; CDF; TVN	
Colombia	Caracol Televisión	
Ecuador	Teleamazonas	
Latin America	DirecTV	
Paraguay	RPC; Tigo Sports	
Peru	América Televisión	
Uruguay	Vera+; TCC	
Venezuela	IVC; TVES; Venevisión	

=== Rest of world ===
Territory	Rights holder	Ref.
Albania	DigitAlb	
Austria	DAZN	
Australia	beIN Sports	
Balkans	Arena Sport	
Belgium	Telenet	
Brunei	RTB	
Cambodia	CBS	
Canada	RDS; TSN	
Caribbean	Digicel	
Central America	Sky	
China	CCTV; PPTV	
Costa Rica	Repretel	
Czech Republic	O2	
El Salvador	TCS	
France	beIN Sports	
Germany	DAZN	
Greece	ERT	
Guatemala	Chapin TV; Radio Televisión de Guatemala	
Honduras	Canal 6; Tigo Sports	
Hong Kong	PCCW	
Hungary	Sport TV	
Indonesia	MNC Sports; K-Vision	
Ireland	Eir Sport; Premier Sports	
Italy	DAZN	
Israel	Charlton	
Japan	DAZN	
Kazakhstan	Setanta Sports	
Macau	TDM	
Malaysia	RTM	
MENA	beIN Sports	
Mexico	Televisa; TV Azteca	
Netherlands	Fox Sports	
New Zealand	beIN Sports	
Nordics	NENT	
Panama	RPC-TV; TVMax	
Poland	Polsat	
Portugal	Sport TV	
Romania	Eurosport	
Russia	Match TV	
Singapore	StarHub	
Slovenia	ŠTV	
South Korea	JTBC	
Spain	DAZN · CRTVG	
Suriname	SCCN	
Sub-Saharan Africa	StarTimes	
Switzerland	DAZN	
Taiwan	ELTA	
Thailand	PPTV	
Turkey	TRT	
United Kingdom	Premier Sports	
United States	ESPN; Telemundo	
Uzbekistan	NTRCU	
Vietnam	FPT Group; K+; MyTV	
