= 2019 Copa América Group B =

Football tournament group stage

Group B of the 2019 Copa América took place from 15 to 23 June 2019. The group consisted of Argentina, Colombia, Paraguay, and guests Qatar of the AFC.

Colombia and Argentina as the top two teams, along with Paraguay as one of the two best third-placed teams, advanced to the quarter-finals.

== Teams ==
Draw position	Team	Pot	Appearance	Previous best performance	FIFA Rankings	
Draw position	Team	Pot	Appearance	Previous best performance	December 2018 (Note: The rankings of December 2018 were used for seeding for the final draw.)	June 2019
B1	Argentina	1	42nd	Winners (1921, 1925, 1927, 1929, 1937, 1941, 1945, 1946, 1947, 1955, 1957, 1959 (A), 1991, 1993)	11	11
B2	Colombia	2	22nd	Winners (2001)	12	13
B3	Paraguay	3	37th	Winners (1953, 1979)	32	36
B4	Qatar (invitee)	4	1st	Debut	93	55

== Standings ==
Pos	Team	Pld	W	D	L	GF	GA	GD	Pts	Qualification
1	Colombia	3	3	0	0	4	0	+4	9	Advance to knockout stage
2	Argentina	3	1	1	1	3	3	0	4	Advance to knockout stage
3	Paraguay	3	0	2	1	3	4	−1	2	Advance to knockout stage
4	Qatar	3	0	1	2	2	5	−3	1	

Source: CONMEBOL
Rules for classification: Tiebreakers

In the quarter-finals:

- The winners of Group B, Colombia, advanced to play the runners-up of Group C, Chile.
- The runners-up of Group B, Argentina, advanced to play the runners-up of Group A, Venezuela.
- The third-placed team of Group B, Paraguay, advanced as one of the two best third-placed teams to play the winners of Group A, Brazil.

== Matches ==
=== Argentina vs Colombia ===
15 June 2019
19:00

Argentina	0–2	Colombia
	Report	Martínez 71'; D. Zapata 86'

Itaipava Arena Fonte Nova, Salvador
Attendance: 35,572
Referee: Roberto Tobar (Chile)

Argentina	Colombia

GK	1	Franco Armani
RB	4	Renzo Saravia	(yellow card) 52'
CB	6	Germán Pezzella
CB	17	Nicolás Otamendi
LB	3	Nicolás Tagliafico
RM	20	Giovani Lo Celso
CM	18	Guido Rodríguez	(yellow card) 42'	(substituted off) 67'
CM	5	Leandro Paredes	(yellow card) 55'
LM	11	Ángel Di María		(substituted off) 46'
CF	10	Lionel Messi (c)
CF	9	Sergio Agüero		(substituted off) 79'
Substitutions:
MF	16	Rodrigo De Paul		(substituted on) 46'
MF	15	Guido Pizarro		(substituted on) 67'
FW	19	Matías Suárez		(substituted on) 79'
Manager:
Lionel Scaloni

GK	1	David Ospina
RB	3	Stefan Medina
CB	13	Yerry Mina
CB	23	Davinson Sánchez
LB	6	William Tesillo
CM	11	Juan Cuadrado	(yellow card) 60'	(substituted off) 64'
CM	5	Wílmar Barrios
CM	15	Mateus Uribe
RF	10	James Rodríguez
CF	9	Radamel Falcao (c)	(yellow card) 19'	(substituted off) 81'
LF	19	Luis Muriel		(substituted off) 14'
Substitutions:
FW	20	Roger Martínez		(substituted on) 14'
MF	16	Jefferson Lerma	(yellow card) 90+4'	(substituted on) 64'
FW	7	Duván Zapata	(yellow card) 87'	(substituted on) 81'
Manager:
(Portugal) Carlos Queiroz

Man of the Match:
Roger Martínez (Colombia)

Assistant referees:
Christian Schiemann (Chile)
Claudio Ríos (Chile)
Fourth official:
Alexis Herrera (Venezuela)
Video assistant referee:
Julio Bascuñán (Chile)
Assistant video assistant referees:
Piero Maza (Chile)
Nicolás Tarán (Uruguay)

=== Paraguay vs Qatar ===
16 June 2019
16:00

Paraguay	2–2	Qatar
Cardozo 4' (pen.); González 56'	Report	Ali 68'; R. Rojas 77' (o.g.)

Estádio do Maracanã, Rio de Janeiro
Attendance: 19,196
Referee: Diego Haro (Peru)

Paraguay	Qatar

GK	12	Gatito Fernández
RB	5	Bruno Valdez
CB	13	Júnior Alonso (c)
CB	4	Fabián Balbuena	(yellow card) 80'
LB	18	Santiago Arzamendia
RM	17	Hernán Pérez	(yellow card) 40'	(substituted off) 46'
CM	8	Rodrigo Rojas		(substituted off) 79'
CM	16	Celso Ortiz
LM	23	Miguel Almirón
CF	7	Óscar Cardozo
CF	19	Cecilio Domínguez		(substituted off) 83'
Substitutions:
FW	10	Derlis González		(substituted on) 46'
MF	6	Richard Sánchez		(substituted on) 79'
FW	11	Juan Iturbe		(substituted on) 83'
Manager:
(Argentina) Eduardo Berizzo

GK	1	Saad Al Sheeb
RB	15	Bassam Al-Rawi
CB	2	Ró-Ró
CB	3	Abdelkarim Hassan	(yellow card) 61'
LB	16	Boualem Khoukhi	(yellow card) 71'
CM	5	Tarek Salman	(yellow card) 26'
CM	6	Abdulaziz Hatem		(substituted off) 88'
CM	10	Hassan Al-Haydos (c)
RF	23	Assim Madibo	(yellow card) 11'
CF	19	Almoez Ali
LF	11	Akram Afif
Substitutions:
MF	12	Karim Boudiaf		(substituted on) 88'
Manager:
(Spain) Félix Sánchez

Man of the Match:
Gatito Fernández (Paraguay)

Assistant referees:
Jonny Bossio (Peru)
Víctor Ráez (Peru)
Fourth official:
Esteban Ostojich (Uruguay)
Video assistant referee:
Raphael Claus (Brazil)
Assistant video assistant referees:
Víctor Carrillo (Peru)
Byron Romero (Ecuador)

=== Colombia vs Qatar ===
19 June 2019
18:30

Colombia	1–0	Qatar
D. Zapata 86'	Report

Estádio do Morumbi, São Paulo
Attendance: 22,079
Referee: Alexis Herrera (Venezuela)

Colombia	Qatar

GK	1	David Ospina
RB	3	Stefan Medina		(substituted off) 46'
CB	13	Yerry Mina
CB	23	Davinson Sánchez
LB	6	William Tesillo
CM	11	Juan Cuadrado		(substituted off) 64'
CM	5	Wílmar Barrios
CM	15	Mateus Uribe	(yellow card) 73'
RF	20	Roger Martínez		(substituted off) 75'
CF	7	Duván Zapata
LF	10	James Rodríguez (c)
Substitutions:
DF	4	Santiago Arias		(substituted on) 46'
FW	9	Radamel Falcao		(substituted on) 64'
FW	14	Luis Díaz		(substituted on) 75'
Manager:
(Portugal) Carlos Queiroz

GK	1	Saad Al Sheeb
CB	15	Bassam Al-Rawi
CB	16	Boualem Khoukhi
CB	5	Tarek Salman
DM	23	Assim Madibo	(yellow card) 44'
CM	10	Hassan Al-Haydos (c)		(substituted off) 84'
CM	6	Abdulaziz Hatem		(substituted off) 66'
RW	2	Ró-Ró	(yellow card) 73'
LW	3	Abdelkarim Hassan	(yellow card) 57'
SS	11	Akram Afif	(yellow card) 83'
CF	19	Almoez Ali
Substitutions:
MF	12	Karim Boudiaf		(substituted on) 66'
MF	17	Ahmed Moein		(substituted on) 84'
Manager:
(Spain) Félix Sánchez

Man of the Match:
James Rodríguez (Colombia)

Assistant referees:
Luis Murillo (Venezuela)
Nicolás Taran (Uruguay)
Fourth official:
Víctor Carrillo (Peru)
Video assistant referee:
Jesús Valenzuela (Venezuela)
Assistant video assistant referees:
Anderson Daronco (Brazil)
Richard Trinidad (Uruguay)

=== Argentina vs Paraguay ===
19 June 2019
21:30

Argentina	1–1	Paraguay
Messi 57' (pen.)	Report	Sánchez 37'

Estádio Mineirão, Belo Horizonte
Attendance: 35,265
Referee: Wilton Sampaio (Brazil)

Argentina	Paraguay

GK	1	Franco Armani	(yellow card) 45'
RB	14	Milton Casco
CB	6	Germán Pezzella
CB	17	Nicolás Otamendi	(yellow card) 83'
LB	3	Nicolás Tagliafico	(yellow card) 80'
RM	7	Roberto Pereyra		(substituted off) 46'
CM	5	Leandro Paredes
CM	20	Giovani Lo Celso
LM	16	Rodrigo De Paul		(substituted off) 87'
CF	10	Lionel Messi (c)
CF	22	Lautaro Martínez		(substituted off) 67'
Substitutions:
FW	9	Sergio Agüero		(substituted on) 46'
MF	11	Ángel Di María		(substituted on) 67'
FW	19	Matías Suárez		(substituted on) 87'
Manager:
Lionel Scaloni

GK	12	Gatito Fernández
RB	2	Iván Piris	(yellow card) 55'
CB	15	Gustavo Gómez (c)	(yellow card) 32'
CB	13	Júnior Alonso
LB	18	Santiago Arzamendia
CM	8	Rodrigo Rojas	(yellow card) 43'
CM	6	Richard Sánchez
RW	10	Derlis González		(substituted off) 90'
AM	23	Miguel Almirón		(substituted off) 87'
LW	20	Matías Rojas
CF	9	Federico Santander		(substituted off) 72'
Substitutions:
FW	21	Óscar Romero		(substituted on) 72'
MF	16	Celso Ortiz		(substituted on) 87'
DF	3	Juan Escobar		(substituted on) 90'
Manager:
(Argentina) Eduardo Berizzo

Man of the Match:
Gatito Fernández (Paraguay)

Assistant referees:
Marcelo van Gasse (Brazil)
Rodrigo Correa (Brazil)
Fourth official:
Carlos Orbe (Ecuador)
Video assistant referee:
Leodán González (Uruguay)
Assistant video assistant referees:
Raphael Claus (Brazil)
Kléber Lúcio Gil (Brazil)

=== Qatar vs Argentina ===
23 June 2019
16:00

Qatar	0–2	Argentina
	Report	Martínez 4'; Agüero 82'

Arena do Grêmio, Porto Alegre
Attendance: 41,390
Referee: Julio Bascuñán (Chile)

Qatar	Argentina

GK	1	Saad Al Sheeb
CB	15	Bassam Al-Rawi
CB	16	Boualem Khoukhi
CB	14	Salem Al-Hajri		(substituted off) 76'
RWB	2	Ró-Ró		(substituted off) 84'
LWB	5	Tarek Salman
CM	10	Hassan Al-Haydos (c)
CM	12	Karim Boudiaf	(yellow card) 74'
CM	6	Abdulaziz Hatem
SS	11	Akram Afif
CF	19	Almoez Ali	(yellow card) 50'
Substitutions:
MF	9	Abdullah Al-Ahrak	(yellow card) 88'	(substituted on) 76'
DF	8	Hamid Ismail		(substituted on) 84'
Manager:
(Spain) Félix Sánchez

GK	1	Franco Armani
RB	4	Renzo Saravia
CB	2	Juan Foyth	(yellow card) 44'	(substituted off) 84'
CB	17	Nicolás Otamendi
LB	3	Nicolás Tagliafico
CM	16	Rodrigo De Paul
CM	5	Leandro Paredes
CM	20	Giovani Lo Celso	(yellow card) 41'	(substituted off) 54'
AM	10	Lionel Messi (c)
CF	22	Lautaro Martínez		(substituted off) 75'
CF	9	Sergio Agüero
Substitutions:
MF	8	Marcos Acuña		(substituted on) 54'
FW	21	Paulo Dybala		(substituted on) 75'
DF	6	Germán Pezzella		(substituted on) 84'
Manager:
Lionel Scaloni			(yellow card) 65'

Man of the Match:
Lionel Messi (Argentina)

Assistant referees:
Christian Schiemann (Chile)
Claudio Ríos (Chile)
Fourth official:
Roddy Zambrano (Ecuador)
Video assistant referee:
Roberto Tobar (Chile)
Assistant video assistant referees:
Gery Vargas (Bolivia)
Christian Lescano (Ecuador)

=== Colombia vs Paraguay ===
23 June 2019
16:00

Colombia	1–0	Paraguay
Cuéllar 31'	Report

Itaipava Arena Fonte Nova, Salvador
Attendance: 13,903
Referee: Víctor Carrillo (Peru)

Colombia	Paraguay

GK	22	Álvaro Montero
RB	4	Santiago Arias
CB	2	Cristián Zapata
CB	21	Jhon Lucumí	(yellow card) 41'
LB	17	Cristan Borja	(yellow card) 29'
CM	18	Gustavo Cuéllar
CM	16	Jefferson Lerma
RW	11	Juan Cuadrado		(substituted off) 57'
AM	8	Edwin Cardona		(substituted off) 84'
LW	14	Luis Díaz
CF	9	Radamel Falcao (c)		(substituted off) 65'
Substitutions:
MF	10	James Rodríguez		(substituted on) 57'
FW	7	Duván Zapata		(substituted on) 65'
MF	5	Wílmar Barrios		(substituted on) 84'
Manager:
(Portugal) Carlos Queiroz

GK	12	Gatito Fernández
RB	2	Iván Piris
CB	15	Gustavo Gómez
CB	13	Júnior Alonso
LB	18	Santiago Arzamendia	(yellow card) 48'
CM	8	Juan Rodrigo Rojas		(substituted off) 62'
CM	6	Richard Sánchez
RW	10	Derlis González		(substituted off) 81'
AM	23	Miguel Almirón
LW	20	Matías Rojas		(substituted off) 46'
CF	7	Óscar Cardozo (c)
Substitutions:
FW	19	Cecilio Domínguez		(substituted on) 46'
FW	11	Juan Iturbe		(substituted on) 62'
FW	21	Óscar Romero		(substituted on) 81'
Manager:
(Argentina) Eduardo Berizzo

Man of the Match:
Gatito Fernández (Paraguay)

Assistant referees:
Jonny Bossio (Peru)
Víctor Ráez (Peru)
Fourth official:
Alexis Herrera (Venezuela)
Video assistant referee:
Anderson Daronco (Brazil)
Assistant video assistant referees:
Diego Haro (Peru)
Byron Romero (Ecuador)

== Discipline ==
Fair play points would have been used as tiebreakers if the overall and head-to-head records of teams were tied. These were calculated based on yellow and red cards received in all group matches as follows:

- first yellow card: minus 1 point;
- indirect red card (second yellow card): minus 3 points;
- direct red card: minus 4 points;
- yellow card and direct red card: minus 5 points;

Only one of the above deductions were applied to a player in a single match.

Team	Match 1				Match 2				Match 3				Points
Team	Booked	(yellow card) (yellow-red card)	Sent off (straight red)	(yellow card) (red card)	Booked	(yellow card) (yellow-red card)	Sent off (straight red)	(yellow card) (red card)	Booked	(yellow card) (yellow-red card)	Sent off (straight red)	(yellow card) (red card)	Points
Paraguay	2				3				1				−6
Colombia	4				1				2				−7
Argentina	3				3				2				−8
Qatar	4				4				3				−11
