= 2019 Copa América Group C =

Football tournament group stage

Group C of the 2019 Copa América took place from 16 to 24 June 2019. The group consisted of title holders Chile, Ecuador, guests Japan of the AFC, and Uruguay.

Uruguay and Chile advanced to the quarter-finals.

== Teams ==
| Draw position | Team | Pot | Appearance | Previous best performance | FIFA Rankings | |
| Draw position | Team | Pot | Appearance | Previous best performance | December 2018 (Note: The rankings of December 2018 were used for seeding for the final draw.) | June 2019 |
|---|---|---|---|---|---|---|
| C1 | Uruguay | 1 | 44th | Winners (1916, 1917, 1920, 1923, 1924, 1926, 1935, 1942, 1956, 1959 (E), 1967, 1983, 1987, 1995, 2011) | 7 | 8 |
| C2 | Ecuador | 4 | 28th | Fourth place (1959 (E), 1993) | 57 | 60 |
| C3 | Japan (invitee) | 3 | 2nd | Group stage (1999) | 50 | 28 |
| C4 | Chile | 2 | 39th | Winners (2015, 2016) | 13 | 16 |

== Standings ==
| Pos | Team | Pld | W | D | L | GF | GA | GD | Pts | Qualification |
|---|---|---|---|---|---|---|---|---|---|---|
| 1 | Uruguay | 3 | 2 | 1 | 0 | 7 | 2 | +5 | 7 | Advance to knockout stage |
| 2 | Chile | 3 | 2 | 0 | 1 | 6 | 2 | +4 | 6 | Advance to knockout stage |
| 3 | Japan | 3 | 0 | 2 | 1 | 3 | 7 | −4 | 2 | |
| 4 | Ecuador | 3 | 0 | 1 | 2 | 2 | 7 | −5 | 1 | |

Source: CONMEBOL
Rules for classification: Tiebreakers

In the quarter-finals:

- The winners of Group C, Uruguay, advanced to play the third-placed team of Group A, Peru.
- The runners-up of Group C, Chile, advanced to play the winners of Group B, Colombia.

== Matches ==
=== Uruguay vs Ecuador ===
16 June 2019
19:00

| Uruguay | 4–0 | Ecuador |
|---|---|---|
| Lodeiro 6'; Cavani 33'; Suárez 44'; Mina 78' (o.g.) | Report |

Estádio Mineirão, Belo Horizonte
Attendance: 13,611
Referee: Anderson Daronco (Brazil)

| Uruguay | Ecuador |

| GK | 1 | Fernando Muslera |
| RB | 22 | Martín Cáceres |
| CB | 2 | José Giménez | (yellow card) 63' |
| CB | 3 | Diego Godín (c) |
| LB | 17 | Diego Laxalt |
| DM | 5 | Matías Vecino | | (substituted off) 81' |
| DM | 6 | Rodrigo Bentancur |
| CM | 8 | Nahitan Nández | | (substituted off) 64' |
| CM | 7 | Nicolás Lodeiro | (yellow card) 14' | (substituted off) 75' |
| CF | 21 | Edinson Cavani |
| CF | 9 | Luis Suárez |
Substitutions:
| MF | 16 | Gastón Pereiro | | (substituted on) 64' |
| MF | 14 | Lucas Torreira | | (substituted on) 75' |
| MF | 15 | Federico Valverde | | (substituted on) 81' |
Manager:
Óscar Tabárez

| GK | 22 | Alexander Domínguez |
| RB | 17 | José Quintero | (red card) 24' |
| CB | 2 | Arturo Mina |
| CB | 21 | Gabriel Achilier (c) |
| LB | 19 | Beder Caicedo |
| CM | 15 | Jefferson Intriago |
| CM | 18 | Jefferson Orejuela |
| RW | 16 | Antonio Valencia |
| AM | 10 | Ángel Mena | | (substituted off) 29' |
| LW | 11 | Ayrton Preciado | | (substituted off) 46' |
| CF | 13 | Enner Valencia |
Substitutions:
| DF | 4 | Pedro Velasco | | (substituted on) 29' |
| MF | 7 | Romario Ibarra | | (substituted on) 46' |
Manager:
(Colombia) Hernán Darío Gómez

Man of the Match:
Edinson Cavani (Uruguay)

Assistant referees:
Marcelo Van Gasse (Brazil)
Kléber Gil (Brazil)
Fourth official:
Nicolás Gallo (Colombia)
Video assistant referee:
Wilton Sampaio (Brazil)
Assistant video assistant referees:
Fernando Rapallini (Argentina)
Rodrigo Correa (Brazil)

=== Japan vs Chile ===
17 June 2019
20:00

| Japan | 0–4 | Chile |
|---|---|---|
| | Report | Pulgar 41'; Vargas 54', 83'; Sánchez 82' |

Estádio do Morumbi, São Paulo
Attendance: 23,253
Referee: Mario Díaz de Vivar (Paraguay)

| Japan | Chile |

| GK | 23 | Keisuke Osako |
| CB | 16 | Takehiro Tomiyasu |
| CB | 3 | Yuta Nakayama | (yellow card) 21' |
| CB | 5 | Naomichi Ueda |
| RM | 14 | Teruki Hara | (yellow card) 19' |
| CM | 21 | Takefusa Kubo |
| CM | 7 | Gaku Shibasaki (c) |
| LM | 2 | Daiki Sugioka |
| RF | 9 | Daizen Maeda | | (substituted off) 66' |
| CF | 13 | Ayase Ueda | | (substituted off) 79' |
| LF | 10 | Shoya Nakajima | | (substituted off) 66' |
Substitutions:
| MF | 11 | Koji Miyoshi | | (substituted on) 66' |
| MF | 20 | Hiroki Abe | | (substituted on) 66' |
| FW | 18 | Shinji Okazaki | | (substituted on) 79' |
Manager:
Hajime Moriyasu

| GK | 1 | Gabriel Arias |
| RB | 4 | Mauricio Isla |
| CB | 17 | Gary Medel (c) |
| CB | 3 | Guillermo Maripán |
| LB | 15 | Jean Beausejour |
| CM | 20 | Charles Aránguiz |
| CM | 13 | Erick Pulgar |
| CM | 8 | Arturo Vidal | | (substituted off) 78' |
| RF | 6 | José Pedro Fuenzalida | | (substituted off) 80' |
| CF | 11 | Eduardo Vargas |
| LF | 7 | Alexis Sánchez | | (substituted off) 87' |
Substitutions:
| MF | 16 | Pablo Hernández | | (substituted on) 78' |
| DF | 21 | Óscar Opazo | (yellow card) 90+2' | (substituted on) 80' |
| FW | 19 | Júnior Fernándes | | (substituted on) 87' |
Manager:
(Colombia) Reinaldo Rueda

Man of the Match:
Alexis Sánchez (Chile)

Assistant referees:
Eduardo Cardozo (Paraguay)
Darío Gaona (Paraguay)
Fourth official:
Arnaldo Samaniego (Paraguay)
Video assistant referee:
Jesús Valenzuela (Venezuela)
Assistant video assistant referees:
Gery Vargas (Bolivia)
Wilmar Navarro (Colombia)

=== Uruguay vs Japan ===
20 June 2019
20:00

| Uruguay | 2–2 | Japan |
|---|---|---|
| Suárez 32' (pen.); Giménez 66' | Report | Miyoshi 25', 59' |

Arena do Grêmio, Porto Alegre
Attendance: 39,733
Referee: Andrés Rojas (Colombia)

| Uruguay | Japan |

| GK | 1 | Fernando Muslera |
| RB | 22 | Martín Cáceres |
| CB | 2 | José Giménez |
| CB | 3 | Diego Godín (c) |
| LB | 17 | Diego Laxalt | (substituted off) 28' |
| RM | 8 | Nahitan Nández | (substituted off) 60' |
| CM | 14 | Lucas Torreira |
| CM | 6 | Rodrigo Bentancur |
| LM | 7 | Nicolás Lodeiro | (substituted off) 73' |
| CF | 9 | Luis Suárez |
| CF | 21 | Edinson Cavani |
Substitutions:
| DF | 4 | Giovanni González | (substituted on) 28' |
| MF | 10 | Giorgian De Arrascaeta | (substituted on) 60' |
| MF | 15 | Federico Valverde | (substituted on) 73' |
Manager:
Óscar Tabárez

| GK | 1 | Eiji Kawashima |
| RB | 19 | Tomoki Iwata | | (substituted off) 87' |
| CB | 5 | Naomichi Ueda | (yellow card) 31' |
| CB | 16 | Takehiro Tomiyasu |
| LB | 2 | Daiki Sugioka |
| RM | 11 | Koji Miyoshi | | (substituted off) 83' |
| CM | 7 | Gaku Shibasaki (c) |
| CM | 4 | Ko Itakura |
| LM | 10 | Shoya Nakajima | (yellow card) 78' |
| CF | 18 | Shinji Okazaki |
| CF | 20 | Hiroki Abe | | (substituted off) 67' |
Substitutions:
| FW | 13 | Ayase Ueda | | (substituted on) 67' |
| MF | 21 | Takefusa Kubo | | (substituted on) 83' |
| DF | 22 | Yugo Tatsuta | | (substituted on) 87' |
Manager:
Hajime Moriyasu

Man of the Match:
Koji Miyoshi (Japan)

Assistant referees:
Alexander Guzmán (Colombia)
Wilmar Navarro (Colombia)
Fourth official:
Nicolás Gallo (Colombia)
Video assistant referee:
Diego Haro (Peru)
Assistant video assistant referees:
Néstor Pitana (Argentina)
Hernán Maidana (Argentina)

=== Ecuador vs Chile ===
21 June 2019
20:00

| Ecuador | 1–2 | Chile |
|---|---|---|
| E. Valencia 26' (pen.) | Report | Fuenzalida 8'; Sánchez 51' |

Itaipava Arena Fonte Nova, Salvador
Attendance: 14,727
Referee: Patricio Loustau (Argentina)

| Ecuador | Chile |

| GK | 22 | Alexander Domínguez |
| RB | 4 | Pedro Velasco | (yellow card) 90+6' |
| CB | 21 | Gabriel Achilier | (red card) 89' |
| CB | 3 | Robert Arboleda | (yellow card) 78' |
| LB | 6 | Cristian Ramírez |
| CM | 23 | Sebas Méndez | (yellow card) 3' | (substituted off) 60' |
| CM | 8 | Carlos Gruezo | (yellow card) 81' |
| CM | 18 | Jefferson Orejuela |
| RF | 10 | Ángel Mena | (yellow card) 34' | (substituted off) 82' |
| CF | 13 | Enner Valencia (c) |
| LF | 7 | Romario Ibarra | | (substituted off) 69' |
Substitutions:
| MF | 16 | Antonio Valencia | | (substituted on) 60' |
| FW | 9 | Carlos Garcés | | (substituted on) 69' |
| MF | 11 | Ayrton Preciado | | (substituted on) 82' |
Manager:
(Colombia) Hernán Darío Gómez

| GK | 1 | Gabriel Arias | (yellow card) 44' |
| RB | 4 | Mauricio Isla | (yellow card) 82' |
| CB | 17 | Gary Medel (c) |
| CB | 3 | Guillermo Maripán |
| LB | 15 | Jean Beausejour | (yellow card) 52' |
| CM | 13 | Erick Pulgar |
| CM | 20 | Charles Aránguiz |
| CM | 8 | Arturo Vidal | (yellow card) 86' | (substituted off) 90+2' |
| RF | 6 | José Pedro Fuenzalida | | (substituted off) 70' |
| CF | 11 | Eduardo Vargas | | (substituted off) 86' |
| LF | 7 | Alexis Sánchez |
Substitutions:
| DF | 5 | Paulo Díaz | | (substituted on) 70' |
| MF | 16 | Pablo Hernández | | (substituted on) 86' |
| DF | 18 | Gonzalo Jara | | (substituted on) 90+2' |
Manager:
(Colombia) Reinaldo Rueda

Man of the Match:
Alexis Sánchez (Chile)

Assistant referees:
Juan Pablo Belatti (Argentina)
Ezequiel Brailovsky (Argentina)
Fourth official:
Jesús Valenzuela (Venezuela)
Video assistant referee:
Wilmar Roldán (Colombia)
Assistant video assistant referees:
Mario Díaz de Vivar (Paraguay)
Jhon Alexander León (Colombia)

=== Chile vs Uruguay ===
24 June 2019
20:00

| Chile | 0–1 | Uruguay |
|---|---|---|
| | Report | Cavani 82' |

Estádio do Maracanã, Rio de Janeiro
Attendance: 57,442
Referee: Raphael Claus (Brazil)

| Chile | Uruguay |

| GK | 1 | Gabriel Arias |
| RB | 18 | Gonzalo Jara | (substituted off) 90' |
| CB | 17 | Gary Medel (c) | (substituted off) 55' |
| CB | 3 | Guillermo Maripán |
| LB | 5 | Paulo Díaz |
| DM | 13 | Erick Pulgar |
| RM | 21 | Óscar Opazo |
| CM | 16 | Pablo Hernández |
| CM | 20 | Charles Aránguiz |
| LM | 7 | Alexis Sánchez |
| CF | 11 | Eduardo Vargas | (substituted off) 77' |
Substitutions:
| DF | 2 | Igor Lichnovsky | (substituted on) 55' |
| FW | 19 | Júnior Fernándes | (substituted on) 77' |
| FW | 9 | Nicolás Castillo | (substituted on) 90' |
Manager:
(Colombia) Reinaldo Rueda

| GK | 1 | Fernando Muslera |
| RB | 4 | Giovanni González | (yellow card) 70' |
| CB | 2 | José Giménez |
| CB | 3 | Diego Godín (c) |
| LB | 22 | Martín Cáceres |
| RM | 10 | Giorgian De Arrascaeta | | (substituted off) 76' |
| CM | 15 | Federico Valverde | | (substituted off) 90+2' |
| CM | 6 | Rodrigo Bentancur |
| LM | 7 | Nicolás Lodeiro | | (substituted off) 46' |
| CF | 9 | Luis Suárez |
| CF | 21 | Edinson Cavani |
Substitutions:
| MF | 8 | Nahitan Nández | | (substituted on) 46' |
| FW | 20 | Jonathan Rodríguez | | (substituted on) 76' |
| DF | 19 | Sebastián Coates | | (substituted on) 90+2' |
Manager:
Óscar Tabárez

Man of the Match:
Edinson Cavani (Uruguay)

Assistant referees:
Marcelo Van Gasse (Brazil)
Kléber Lúcio Gil (Brazil)
Fourth official:
Mario Díaz de Vivar (Paraguay)
Video assistant referee:
Wilton Sampaio (Brazil)
Assistant video assistant referees:
Arnaldo Samaniego (Paraguay)
Ezequiel Brailovsky (Argentina)

=== Ecuador vs Japan ===
24 June 2019
20:00

| Ecuador | 1–1 | Japan |
|---|---|---|
| Mena 35' | Report | Nakajima 15' |

Estádio Mineirão, Belo Horizonte
Attendance: 7,623
Referee: Jesús Valenzuela (Venezuela)

| Ecuador | Japan |

| GK | 22 | Alexander Domínguez |
| RB | 4 | Pedro Velasco |
| CB | 2 | Arturo Mina |
| CB | 3 | Robert Arboleda | (yellow card) 72' |
| LB | 6 | Cristian Ramírez |
| DM | 8 | Carlos Gruezo |
| CM | 18 | Jefferson Orejuela |
| CM | 23 | Sebas Méndez | | (substituted off) 46' |
| RW | 10 | Ángel Mena | | (substituted off) 74' |
| LW | 7 | Romario Ibarra | | (substituted off) 83' |
| CF | 13 | Enner Valencia (c) |
Substitutions:
| MF | 11 | Ayrton Preciado | | (substituted on) 46' |
| MF | 20 | Andrés Chicaiza | (yellow card) 89' | (substituted on) 74' |
| MF | 16 | Antonio Valencia | (yellow card) 83' | (substituted on) 83' |
Manager:
(Colombia) Hernán Darío Gómez

| GK | 1 | Eiji Kawashima |
| RB | 19 | Tomoki Iwata |
| CB | 5 | Naomichi Ueda |
| CB | 16 | Takehiro Tomiyasu | (yellow card) 31' |
| LB | 2 | Daiki Sugioka |
| CM | 7 | Gaku Shibasaki (c) |
| CM | 4 | Ko Itakura | | (substituted off) 88' |
| RW | 11 | Koji Miyoshi | | (substituted off) 82' |
| AM | 10 | Shoya Nakajima |
| LW | 21 | Takefusa Kubo |
| CF | 18 | Shinji Okazaki | | (substituted off) 66' |
Substitutions:
| FW | 13 | Ayase Ueda | | (substituted on) 66' |
| MF | 20 | Hiroki Abe | | (substituted on) 82' |
| FW | 9 | Daizen Maeda | | (substituted on) 88' |
Manager:
Hajime Moriyasu

Man of the Match:
Shoya Nakajima (Japan)

Assistant referees:
Luis Murillo (Venezuela)
Rodrigo Correa (Brazil)
Fourth official:
Wilmar Roldán (Colombia)
Video assistant referee:
Fernando Rapallini (Argentina)
Assistant video assistant referees:
Nicolás Gallo (Colombia)
Jhon Alexander León (Colombia)

== Discipline ==
Fair play points would have been used as tiebreakers if the overall and head-to-head records of teams were tied. These were calculated based on yellow and red cards received in all group matches as follows:

- first yellow card: minus 1 point;
- indirect red card (second yellow card): minus 3 points;
- direct red card: minus 4 points;
- yellow card and direct red card: minus 5 points;

Only one of the above deductions were applied to a player in a single match.

| Team | Match 1 | | | | Match 2 | | | | Match 3 | | | | Points |
| Team | Booked | (yellow card) (yellow-red card) | Sent off (straight red) | (yellow card) (red card) | Booked | (yellow card) (yellow-red card) | Sent off (straight red) | (yellow card) (red card) | Booked | (yellow card) (yellow-red card) | Sent off (straight red) | (yellow card) (red card) | Points |
|---|---|---|---|---|---|---|---|---|---|---|---|---|---|
| Uruguay | 2 | | | | | | | | 1 | | | | −3 |
| Chile | 1 | | | | 4 | | | | | | | | −5 |
| Japan | 2 | | | | 2 | | | | 1 | | | | −5 |
| Ecuador | | | 1 | | 5 | | 1 | | 3 | | | | −16 |
