= Ángel Mena =

Ecuadorian footballer (born 1988)

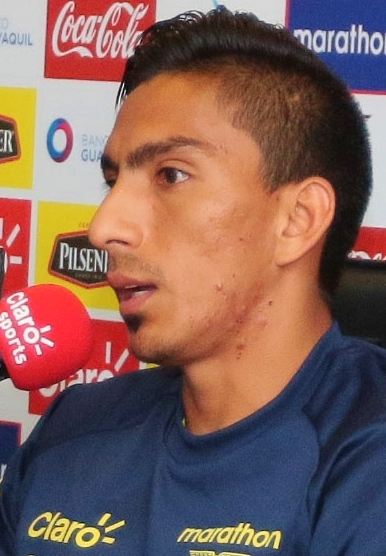
- Mena with Ecuador in 2015

Personal information
- Full name: Ángel Israel Mena Delgado
- Date of birth: 21 January 1988 (age 38)
- Place of birth: Guayaquil, Ecuador
- Height: 1.68 m (5 ft 6 in)
- Position: Winger

Team information
- Current team: Orense
- Number: 13

Youth career
- 2004–2007: Emelec

Senior career*
Years	Team	Apps	(Gls)
2007–2016	Emelec	249	(68)
2010	→ Deportivo Cuenca (loan)	30	(5)
2017–2018	Cruz Azul	52	(10)
2019–2024	León	187	(70)
2024	Pachuca	5	(0)
2025–	Orense	21	(5)

International career^{‡}
2015–2024	Ecuador	62	(8)
- * Club domestic league appearances and goals as of 20 August 2025 ‡ National team caps and goals as of 15 November 2024

Ángel Israel Mena Delgado (born 21 January 1988) is an Ecuadorian professional footballer who plays as a winger for LigaPro Serie A club Orense.

== Club career ==
=== Emelec ===
Mena had extended his contract until 2017 with Club Sport Emelec. He played in 129 games for the national championship and scored 25 goals, according to records of the Ecuadorian Football Federation (FEF).

He debuted in the first division in 2007. He scored his first official goal on 16 March 2008 at the Técnico Universitario.

In 2010, he was loaned to Deportivo Cuenca. In 2011, he returns to Club Sport Emelec, and was champion in 2013 and 2014.

After scoring 14 goals as Emelec won the 2014 championship, Mena extended his contract with the club for two years in February 2015. Mena scored the first goal in the 2014 Ecuadorian Serie A season final match against Barcelona SC, winning 3–0.

=== Cruz Azul ===
In 2017 Mena joined Mexican side Cruz Azul. On 12 February Mena scored an impressive free-kick goal against Santos Laguna which earned Cruz Azul a 2–2 draw.

== International career ==
In April 2014, being in Emelec, Mena was first called up to the Ecuador national football team, led by coach Reinaldo Rueda, for a microcycle. Mena was called for Ecuador's provisional 30-man squad for World Cup 2014 in Brazil.

Later in 2014, the interim coach of the Ecuador national team, Sixto Vizuete called up Mena to play friendly matches against Bolivia and Brazil. However, Mena suffered an injury that prevented him playing with the national team.

Mena made his debut on 28 March 2015 in a match against Mexico, coming in as a sub for Jefferson Montero.

Mena was selected in the 23 player Ecuador squad for the Copa América Centenario.

Mena was selected in the 23-man Ecuador squad for the 2019 Copa América.

Mena was selected in the 28 player Ecuador squad for the 2021 Copa América.

Mena was named in the Ecuadorian squad for the 2022 FIFA World Cup.

Mena was called up to the final 26-man Ecuador squad for the 2024 Copa América. He retired from the national team on 17 November 2024.

== Personal life ==
Mena is married to Shirley Posligua with whom he has two daughters. He and his family are devout Christians. Mena is good friends with fellow footballer Joao Rojas with whom he shared a locker while at Emelec, the fact that Rojas played for Cruz Azul was a significant factor in motivating Mena to join the club.

== Career statistics ==
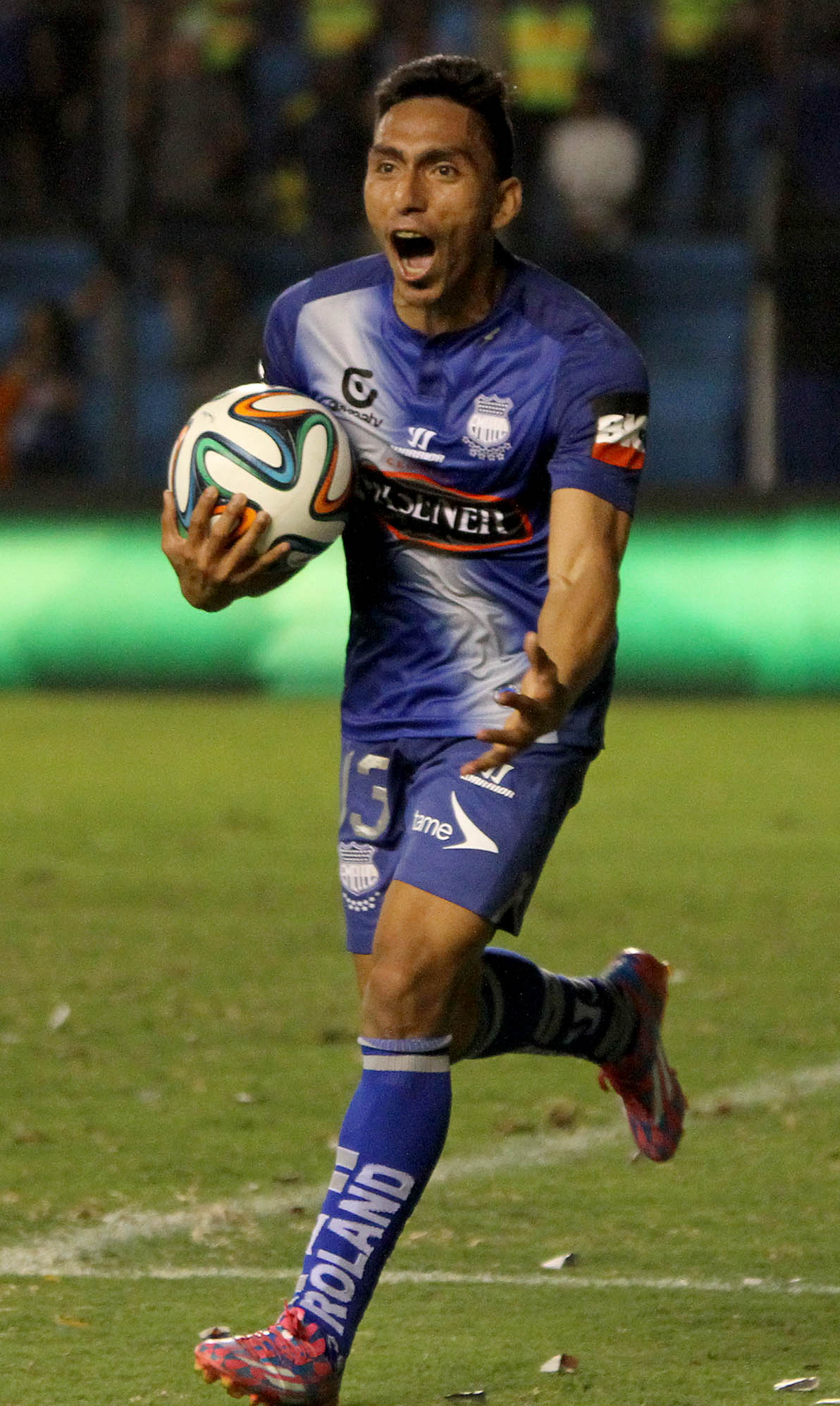
Mena playing for Emelec in 2014

=== Club ===
As of match played 22 October 2024

Appearances and goals by club, season and competition
Club	Season	League			Cup		Continental		Other		Total	
Club	Season	Division	Apps	Goals	Apps	Goals	Apps	Goals	Apps	Goals	Apps	Goals
Emelec	2007	Serie A	4	0	—		0	0	—		4	0
Emelec	2008	Serie A	18	2	—		0	0	—		18	2
Emelec	2009	Serie A	24	2	—		1 (Note: Appearance(s) in the Copa Sudamericana)	0	—		25	2
Emelec	2010	Serie A	0	0	—		2 (Note: Appearance(s) in the Copa Libertadores)	0	—		2	0
Emelec	2011	Serie A	36	6	—		6	0	—		42	6
Emelec	2012	Serie A	21	2	—		7 (Note: Four appearances and one goal in the Copa Libertadores, three appearances in the Copa Sudamericana)	1	—		28	3
Emelec	2013	Serie A	31	3	—		4	1	—		35	4
Emelec	2014	Serie A	41	14	—		14 (Note: Eight appearances and three goals in the Copa Sudamericana, six appearances and one goal in the Copa Libertadores)	4	—		55	18
Emelec	2015	Serie A	38	13	—		14 (Note: Nine appearances and three goals in the Copa Libertadores, five appearances in the Copa Sudamericana)	3	—		52	16
Emelec	2016	Serie A	36	16	—		9 (Note: Five appearances and two goals in the Copa Libertadores, four appearances and one goal in Copa Sudamericana)	3	—		45	19
Emelec	Total		249	58	—		57	12	—		306	70
Deportivo Cuenca (loan)	2010	Serie A	30	5	—		0	0	—		30	5
Cruz Azul	2016–17	Liga MX	16	5	4	2	0	0	—		20	7
Cruz Azul	2017–18	Liga MX	27	3	6	0	0	0	—		33	3
Cruz Azul	2018–19	Liga MX	9	0	2	0	0	0	—		11	0
Cruz Azul	Total		52	8	12	2	0	0	—		64	10
León	2018–19	Liga MX	23	14	3	1	0	0	—		26	15
León	2019–20	Liga MX	30	16	0	0	1 (Note: Appearance(s) in the CONCACAF Champions League)	1	—		31	17
León	2020–21	Liga MX	37	17	0	0	2	0	—		39	17
León	2021–22	Liga MX	35	14	0	0	2	0	4 (Note: Three appearances and three goals in Leagues Cup, one appearance in Campeón de Campeones)	3	41	17
León	2022–23	Liga MX	30	3	0	0	5	3	0	0	35	6
León	2023–24	Liga MX	32	6	0	0	5	3	4 (Note: Three appearances and one goal in Leagues Cup, one appearance in FIFA Club World Cup)	1	41	10
León	Total		187	70	3	1	18	6	8	4	213	82
Pachuca	2024–25	Liga MX	5	0	0	0	0	0	2 (Note: Appearances in Leagues Cup)	0	7	0
Career total			523	141	15	3	72	16	10	4	622	171

=== International ===
As of match played 14 November 2024

Ecuador
Year	Apps	Goals
2015	4	0
2016	4	1
2017	4	0
2019	8	3
2020	4	2
2021	15	1
2022	7	0
2023	9	1
2024	6	0
Total	61	8

List of international goals scored by Ángel Mena
No.	Date	Venue	Opponent	Score	Result	Competition
1	24 March 2016	Estadio Olímpico Atahualpa, Quito, Ecuador	Paraguay	2–2	2–2	2018 FIFA World Cup qualification
2	9 June 2019	AT&T Stadium, Arlington, United States	Mexico	1–1	2–3	Friendly
3	24 June 2019	Mineirão, Belo Horizonte, Brazil	Japan	1–1	1–1	2019 Copa América
4	13 October 2019	Estadio Manuel Martínez Valero, Elche, Spain	Argentina	1–3	1–6	Friendly
5	12 November 2020	Estadio Hernando Siles, La Paz, Bolivia	Bolivia	2–1	3–2	2022 FIFA World Cup qualification
6	17 November 2020	Estadio Rodrigo Paz Delgado, Quito, Ecuador	Colombia	2–0	6–1	2022 FIFA World Cup qualification
7	27 June 2021	Estádio Olímpico Pedro Ludovico, Goiânia, Brazil	Brazil	1–1	1–1	2021 Copa América
8	21 November 2023	Estadio Rodrigo Paz Delgado, Quito, Ecuador	Chile	1–0	1–0	2026 FIFA World Cup qualification

== Honours ==
Emelec

- Serie A: 2013, 2014, 2015

Cruz Azul

- Copa MX: Apertura 2018

León

- Liga MX: Guardianes 2020
- CONCACAF Champions League: 2023
- Leagues Cup: 2021

Individual

- Serie A Assist Leader: 2014
- Liga MX Golden Boot: Clausura 2019
- Liga MX Offensive Midfielder of the Year: 2018–19
- Liga MX Best XI: Clausura 2019, Guardianes 2020, Apertura 2021
- Liga MX All-Star: 2021, 2022
- Leagues Cup top scorer: 2021
