= Erick Pulgar =

Chilean footballer (born 1994)

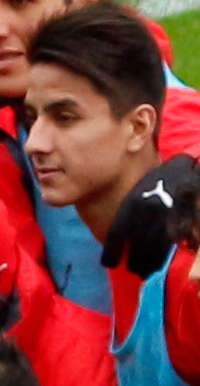
- Pulgar with Chile in 2015

Personal information
- Full name: Erick Antonio Pulgar Farfán
- Date of birth: 15 January 1994 (age 32)
- Place of birth: Antofagasta, Chile
- Height: 1.87 m (6 ft 2 in)
- Position: Defensive midfielder

Team information
- Current team: Flamengo
- Number: 5

Youth career
- 2000–2009: Miramar Club Sur Este
- 2009–2011: Deportes Antofagasta

Senior career*
| Years | Team | Apps | (Gls) |
| 2011–2014 | Deportes Antofagasta | 38 | (2) |
| 2014–2015 | Universidad Católica | 35 | (7) |
| 2015–2019 | Bologna | 100 | (10) |
| 2019–2022 | Fiorentina | 74 | (8) |
| 2022 | → Galatasaray (loan) | 11 | (0) |
| 2022– | Flamengo | 109 | (5) |

International career^{‡}
| 2015–2024 | Chile | 54 | (4) |
Medal record
Representing Chile
| Winner | Copa América | 2016 |
- * Club domestic league appearances and goals as of 7 April 2026 ‡ National team caps and goals as of 15 October 2024

Erick Antonio Pulgar Farfán (born 15 January 1994) is a Chilean professional footballer who plays for Campeonato Brasileiro Série A club Flamengo and the Chile national team. Mainly a defensive midfielder, he can also play as a defender.

== Club career ==
=== Deportes Antofagasta ===
Born in Antofagasta, Pulgar started playing at age 6 for South West Miramar club. At 15, he was invited to a youth championship where the professional Carlos Carcamo approached the young player to sign for the Deportes Antofagasta youth team. At Antofagasta, Pulgar played as a winger and left back. He debuted for the senior team in 2013 after which he became a first team regular. He has been described as a tall, fast player that covers the defense very well, with a good passing game. In 2014 he was named player of the season.

=== Universidad Católica ===
On 28 June 2014, Deportes Antofagasta confirmed the transfer of Pulgar to Universidad Católica, for $400,000 US dollars for 70% of the player's rights. Pulgar signed a three-year contract.

Pulgar was the most outstanding player in a poor Universidad Católica 2014-15 season. After the arrival of manager Mario Salas, he started playing as a midfielder.

=== Bologna ===
On 20 August 2015, Italian club Bologna signed Pulgar from Universidad Católica on a four-year deal for an undisclosed fee. He was given the number 5 shirt. On 11 January 2019, Pulgar extended his contract until 30 June 2022.

=== Fiorentina ===
On 9 August 2019, Pulgar signed for Fiorentina.

==== Loan to Galatasaray ====
On 3 February 2022, Turkish club Galatasaray announced the arrival of Pulgar on loan from Fiorentina.

=== Flamengo ===
On 29 July 2022 Flamengo signed Pulgar from Fiorentina in a €3 million transfer, he signed a contract with the Brazilian club until December 2025.

== International career ==
At the 2019 Copa America, Pulgar scored a goal in Chile's opening match against Japan. This was his first goal for the national side.

== Personal life ==
On 23 August 2020 he tested positive for COVID-19.

== Career statistics ==
=== Club ===
As of match played 17 December 2025

Appearances and goals by club, season and competition
| Club | Season | League | | | State league (Note: Includes Campeonato Carioca) | | National cup (Note: Includes Copa Chile, Coppa Italia, Copa do Brasil) | | Continental | | Other | | Total | |
| Club | Season | Division | Apps | Goals | Apps | Goals | Apps | Goals | Apps | Goals | Apps | Goals | Apps | Goals |
|---|---|---|---|---|---|---|---|---|---|---|---|---|---|---|
| Deportes Antofagasta | 2011 | Primera B de Chile | 1 | 0 | – | | – | | – | | – | | 1 | 0 |
| Deportes Antofagasta | 2012 | Chilean Primera División | 0 | 0 | – | | 3 | 0 | – | | – | | 3 | 0 |
| Deportes Antofagasta | 2013 | Chilean Primera División | 5 | 2 | – | | 6 | 0 | – | | – | | 11 | 2 |
| Deportes Antofagasta | 2013–14 | Chilean Primera División | 32 | 0 | – | | 0 | 0 | – | | – | | 32 | 0 |
| Deportes Antofagasta | 2014–15 | Chilean Primera División | 0 | 0 | – | | 2 | 0 | – | | – | | 2 | 0 |
| Deportes Antofagasta | Total | | 38 | 2 | – | | 11 | 0 | 0 | 0 | 0 | 0 | 49 | 2 |
| Universidad Católica | 2014–15 | Chilean Primera División | 35 | 7 | – | | 3 | 1 | 2 (Note: Appearances in Copa Sudamericana) | 0 | – | | 40 | 8 |
| Bologna | 2015–16 | Serie A | 13 | 0 | – | | 0 | 0 | – | | – | | 13 | 0 |
| Bologna | 2016–17 | Serie A | 27 | 1 | – | | 3 | 0 | – | | – | | 30 | 1 |
| Bologna | 2017–18 | Serie A | 32 | 3 | – | | 1 | 0 | – | | – | | 33 | 3 |
| Bologna | 2018–19 | Serie A | 28 | 6 | – | | 2 | 0 | – | | – | | 30 | 6 |
| Bologna | Total | | 100 | 10 | – | | 6 | 0 | 0 | 0 | 0 | 0 | 106 | 10 |
| Fiorentina | 2019–20 | Serie A | 37 | 7 | – | | 4 | 0 | – | | – | | 41 | 7 |
| Fiorentina | 2020–21 | Serie A | 31 | 1 | – | | 2 | 0 | – | | – | | 33 | 1 |
| Fiorentina | 2021–22 | Serie A | 6 | 0 | – | | 2 | 0 | – | | – | | 8 | 0 |
| Fiorentina | Total | | 74 | 8 | – | | 8 | 0 | 0 | 0 | 0 | 0 | 82 | 8 |
| Galatasaray (loan) | 2021–22 | Süper Lig | 11 | 0 | – | | – | | 0 | 0 | – | | 11 | 0 |
| Flamengo | 2022 | Série A | 6 | 0 | – | | – | | 2 (Note: Appearances in Copa Libertadores) | 0 | – | | 8 | 0 |
| Flamengo | 2023 | Série A | 25 | 2 | 6 | 0 | 6 | 0 | 4 | 0 | 3 (Note: One appearance in Recopa Sudamericana, two appearances in FIFA Club World Cup) | 0 | 44 | 2 |
| Flamengo | 2024 | Série A | 23 | 0 | 11 | 0 | 7 | 0 | 6 | 0 | − | | 47 | 0 |
| Flamengo | 2025 | Série A | 17 | 1 | 9 | 0 | 0 | 0 | 7 | 0 | 7 (Note: One appearance in Supercopa do Brasil, three appearances in FIFA Club World Cup, three appearances in FIFA Intercontinental Cup) | 0 | 40 | 1 |
| Flamengo | Total | | 71 | 3 | 26 | 0 | 13 | 0 | 19 | 0 | 10 | 0 | 139 | 3 |
| Career total | | | 315 | 30 | 26 | 0 | 35 | 1 | 21 | 0 | 10 | 0 | 407 | 31 |

=== International ===
As of match played 15 October 2024

Appearances and goals by national team and year
| National team | Year | Apps | Goals |
|---|---|---|---|
| Chile | 2015 | 2 | 0 |
| Chile | 2016 | 3 | 0 |
| Chile | 2017 | 2 | 0 |
| Chile | 2018 | 6 | 0 |
| Chile | 2019 | 11 | 1 |
| Chile | 2020 | 2 | 0 |
| Chile | 2021 | 11 | 3 |
| Chile | 2022 | 4 | 0 |
| Chile | 2023 | 7 | 0 |
| Chile | 2024 | 6 | 0 |
| Total | | 54 | 4 |

As of match played 14 October 2021. Scores and results list Chile's goal tally first.

List of international goals scored by Erick Pulgar
| No. | Date | Venue | Opponent | Score | Result | Competition |
|---|---|---|---|---|---|---|
| 1. | 17 June 2019 | Estádio do Morumbi, São Paulo, Brazil | Japan | 1–0 | 4–0 | 2019 Copa América |
| 2. | 8 June 2021 | Estadio San Carlos de Apoquindo, Santiago, Chile | Bolivia | 1–0 | 1–1 | 2022 FIFA World Cup qualification |
| 3. | 14 October 2021 | Estadio San Carlos de Apoquindo, Santiago, Chile | Venezuela | 1–0 | 3–0 | 2022 FIFA World Cup qualification |
| 4. | 14 October 2021 | Estadio San Carlos de Apoquindo, Santiago, Chile | Venezuela | 2–0 | 3–0 | 2022 FIFA World Cup qualification |

== Honours ==
Flamengo

- FIFA Challenger Cup: 2025
- FIFA Derby of the Americas: 2025
- Copa Libertadores: 2022, 2025
- Campeonato Brasileiro Série A: 2025
- Copa do Brasil: 2024
- Supercopa do Brasil: 2025
- Campeonato Carioca: 2024, 2025, 2026

Chile

- Copa América: 2016

Individual

- Bola de Prata: 2023
- Campeonato Carioca Team of the Year: 2024, 2025
- Copa do Brasil Team of the Season: 2024
- Copa Libertadores Team of the Tournament: 2025
- Chilean Footballer of the Year: 2025
- South American Team of the Year: 2025
