= Arena do Grêmio =

Stadium in Rio Grande do Sul, Brazil

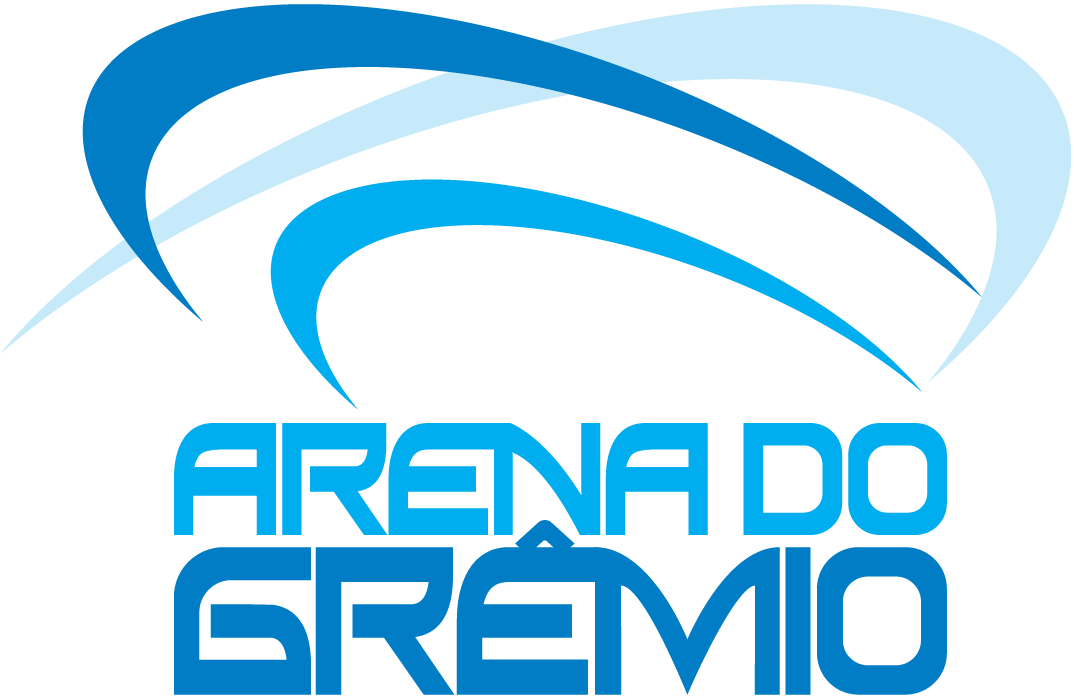

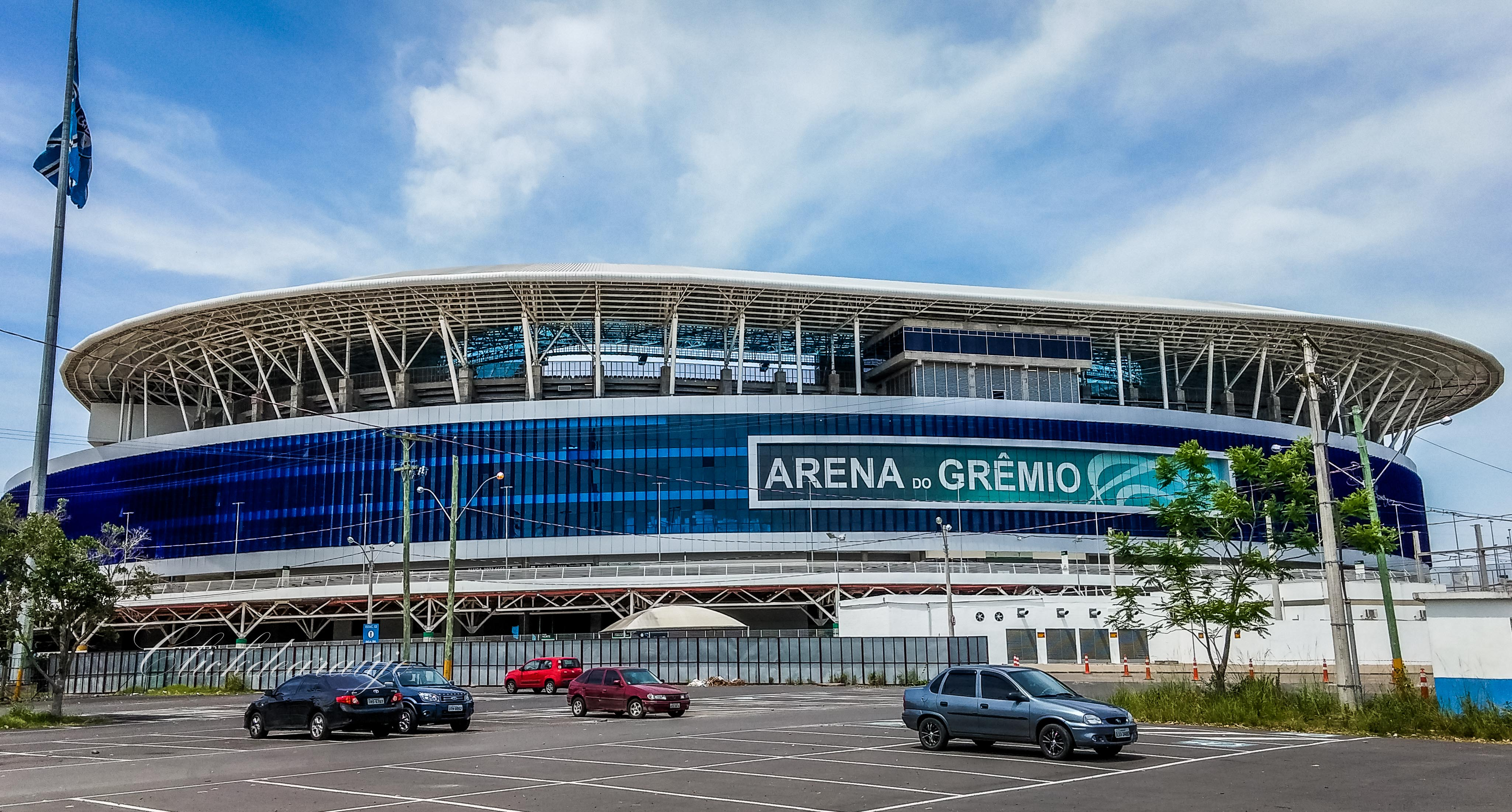
- Sisbrace
- Interactive map of Arena do Grêmio
- Address: Padre Leopoldo Brentano Avenue, 110
- Location: Porto Alegre, Rio Grande do Sul
- Coordinates: 29°58′24″S 51°11′40″W
- Owner: Grêmio
- Operator: Grêmio
- Capacity: 55,225 (seated) 60,540 (total)
- Executive suites: 135
- Surface: Lolium perenne Desso GrassMaster
- Scoreboard: LED
- Field size: 105 m × 68 m (344 ft × 223 ft)

Construction
- Groundbreaking: September 20, 2010
- Opened: 8 December 2012; 13 years ago
- Cost: € 205 million
- Architect: PLARQ Arquitetura
- General contractor: OAS

Tenant
- Grêmio (2013–present)

Website
- Official website

Arena do Grêmio is a multi-use stadium in Porto Alegre, Rio Grande do Sul. It was inaugurated on December 8, 2012.

It is used mostly for football matches and as the home stadium of Grêmio, replacing the Estádio Olímpico Monumental. With a 60,540 capacity (55,662 current official capacity), the stadium is one of the most modern venues in South America.

In Sisbrace, the Brazilian Ministry of Sport's football stadium evaluation system, Arena do Grêmio received the highest rating in all aspects. Arena also received from UEFA a "Category Four" evaluation from UEFA's stadium categories, the only in Brazil. Even though it is one of the most modern stadiums in Brazil, it was not listed as a host of the 2014 FIFA World Cup, held in the country, but in 2019 Arena do Grêmio was selected as one of the venues for the 2019 Copa América where five matches were played in the stadium.

== Concept ==
A mile from the international airport of Porto Alegre and alongside the road way, the stadium site appeared perfect to create a multifunctional urban center. The complex includes a Conference and Congress Center, hotel, a mall, housing, condominiums and parking. The arena itself intends to be functional year round.

The architectural firm PLARQ is responsible for the stadium projects design and concept and OAS is the general contractor.

== History ==
In the mid-2000s, an idea came within the Grêmio, to build a new stadium to host matches of the Tricolor. The idea was carried out in 2006 with the beginning of the work viability studies. The objective was to make a self-sustaining stadium, unlike the Estádio Olímpico Monumental, that was already falling apart. In May 2006, the Grêmio's master patrimonial plan was formulated, which, precisely, headed the project. From there began a discussion about the construction place, in the current location of Olímpico or in a new place. In November 2006, aiming to dispel this doubt, was made a pre-feasibility study for the construction of a new stadium, with the Dutch company Amsterdam Advisory Arena. The conclusion was that the Estádio Olímpico would not meet the expectations of the club, due to high maintenance cost, age of construction, low standard of comfort, security and services, insufficient parking and location in very populated region. This combination of factors led the club to opt for building an Arena, with the financial assistance of partners, with the standard required by FIFA.

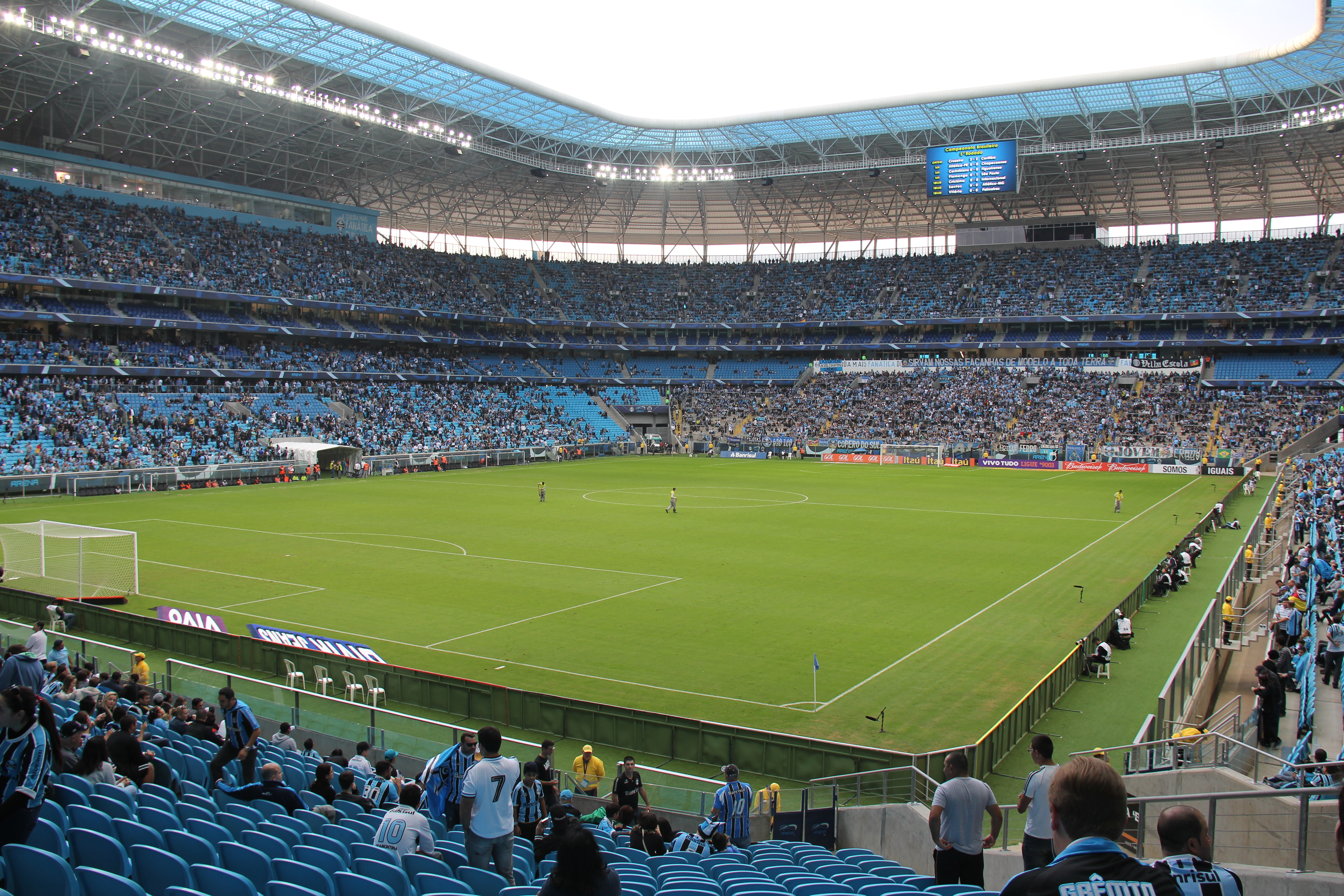
Interior view.

=== Beginning of construction ===
In October 2009, fences were installed to surround the region. On May 13, 2010, a flagpole with Grêmio's flag was inaugurated on the ground.

The official launch of the works took place on September 20, 2010, after a motorcade output from the Estádio Olímpico. On the same day, at the ceremony of start of construction, Hugo de León planted a patch of grass of Olímpico on the Arena ground after landing in a helicopter. Later, the former footballer represented symbolically the works to push the button on a machine and turn it on.

In late February 2011, about three hundred workers stopped their activities, protesting for better wages, working conditions and housing, days off to visit their families - as many workers were from the northeast of Brazil - and a longer rest. Requests were met quickly, and all worked back to full steam.

== Important matches ==
=== Inauguration ===
8 December 2012	Grêmio (Brazil)	2–1	(Germany) Hamburger SV	Porto Alegre, Brazil
22:00 UTC−2	André Lima 9'; Moreno 87'	Report	Westermann 71'	Stadium: Arena do Grêmio; Attendance: 60,540; Referee: Carlos Amarilla (Paraguay)

=== 2012 Match Against Poverty ===
19 December 2012	Ronaldo's XI	3–2	Zidane's XI	Porto Alegre, Brazil
21:00 UTC−2	Bebeto 36'; Cacá 79'; Leandro Damião 87'	Report	Falcão 60'; Zidane 65'	Stadium: Arena do Grêmio; Attendance: 60,540; Referee: Pierluigi Collina (Italy)

=== First official match: Copa Libertadores 2013, First Stage (second leg) ===
30 January 2013	Grêmio (Brazil)	1–0 (1–1 agg.) (5–4 p)	(Ecuador) LDU Quito	Porto Alegre, Brazil
22:00 UTC−2	Elano 62'	Report		Stadium: Arena do Grêmio; Attendance: 41,461; Referee: Saúl Laverni (Argentina)
	Penalties
	André Lima (penalty scored); Saimon (penalty missed); Willian José (penalty scored); Pará (penalty scored); Vargas (penalty scored); Alex Telles (penalty scored)		(penalty scored) Saritama; (penalty scored) Vitti; (penalty missed) Reasco; (penalty scored) Vélez; (penalty scored) Canuto; (penalty missed) Morante

=== International friendly: Brazil vs France ===
9 June 2013	Brazil	3–0	France	Porto Alegre, Brazil
16:00 UTC−3	Oscar 53'; Hernanes 84'; Lucas Moura 90+2' (pen.)	Report		Stadium: Arena do Grêmio; Attendance: 51,643; Referee: Víctor Hugo Carrillo (Peru)

=== City derby ===
9 August 2015	Grêmio (Brazil)	5–0	(Brazil) Internacional	Porto Alegre, Brazil
18:30 UTC−3	Giuliano 34'; Luan 42', 48'; Fernandinho 75'; Réver 83' (o.g.)	Report		Stadium: Arena do Grêmio; Attendance: 46.010; Referee: Dewson Freitas

=== Brazilian Cup Final ===
7 December 2016	Grêmio (Brazil)	1–1	(Brazil) Atlético-MG	Porto Alegre, Brazil
21:45 UTC−3	Bolaños 88'		Cazares 90+1'	Stadium: Arena do Grêmio; Attendance: 55.000; Referee: Luiz Flávio de Oliveira (FIFA)

=== 2018 FIFA World Cup qualification ===
31 August 2017	Brazil	2–0	Ecuador	Porto Alegre, Brazil
21:45 UTC−3	Paulinho 69'; Coutinho 76'	Report (FIFA); Report (CONMEBOL)		Stadium: Arena do Grêmio; Attendance: 38,000; Referee: Mario Díaz de Vivar (Paraguay)

=== 2017 Copa Libertadores Final 1st leg ===
22 November 2017	Grêmio (Brazil)	1–0	(Argentina) Lanús	Porto Alegre, Brazil
21:45 UTC−2	Cícero 82'	Report		Stadium: Arena do Grêmio; Attendance: 55,188; Referee: Julio Bascuñán (Chile)

=== 2019 Copa América ===
Date	Time (UTC-03)	Team #1	Res.	Team #2	Round	Attendance
June 15, 2019	16:00	Venezuela	0–0	Peru	Group A	13,370
June 20, 2019	20:00	Uruguay	2–2	Japan	Group C	39,733
June 23, 2019	16:00	Qatar	0–2	Argentina	Group B	41,390
June 27, 2019	21:30	Brazil	0–0 (4–3 pen.)	Paraguay	Quarter-finals	44,902
July 3, 2019	21:30	Chile	0–3	Peru	Semi-finals	33,058

== Concerts ==
With the multi-use stadium concept, the Arena do Grêmio easily adapts to receive more different genres of shows and events. The first was to be held in April 2013, receiving a concert celebrating the 72 years old of singer Roberto Carlos, with a sold-out audience of 50,000. In June 2014, the Arena hosted the first show of the 2014 Green Valley World Tour, which was attended by the residents of the largest electronic music festival in the world and known as the "Maestros of Tomorrowland": Dimitri Vegas & Like Mike, to an audience of over 14,000 fans.

Events at Arena do Grêmio
Date	Event	Artist(s)	Attendance
20 April 2013	2013 Roberto Carlos Tour	Roberto Carlos	50,000
18 June 2014	2014 Green Valley World Tour	Dimitri Vegas & Like Mike, WolfPack, Thomaz Krause, Marcelo CIC, Rapha Costa	14,000
14 December 2014	Happy Holi	Alok, FTampa, Diego Miranda, LyoPak	12,000
2 May 2015	Save Festival - Super Club	Nicky Romero	7,000
11 November 2015	2015 Latin America Tour	Pearl Jam	29,667
16 December 2015	Rattle That Lock Tour	David Gilmour	37,674
11 November 2017	A Head Full of Dreams Tour	Coldplay	50,229
14 March 2018	Witness: The Tour	Katy Perry	19,000
23 October 2018	El Dorado World Tour	Shakira	28,300
17 February 2019	÷ Tour	Ed Sheeran	38,635
9 October 2019	Legacy of the Beast World Tour	Iron Maiden	60,000
April 26, 2022	End of the Road World Tour	Kiss	TBA
September 24, 2022	Guns N' Roses 2020 Tour	Guns N' Roses	TBA
November 1, 2023	This Is Not a Drill	Roger Waters	TBA
November 16, 2023	Global Stadium Tour	Red Hot Chili Peppers	TBA

== See also ==
- List of football stadiums in Brazil
- Lists of stadiums
