= Rodrigo Rojas (footballer) =

Paraguayan footballer (born 1988)

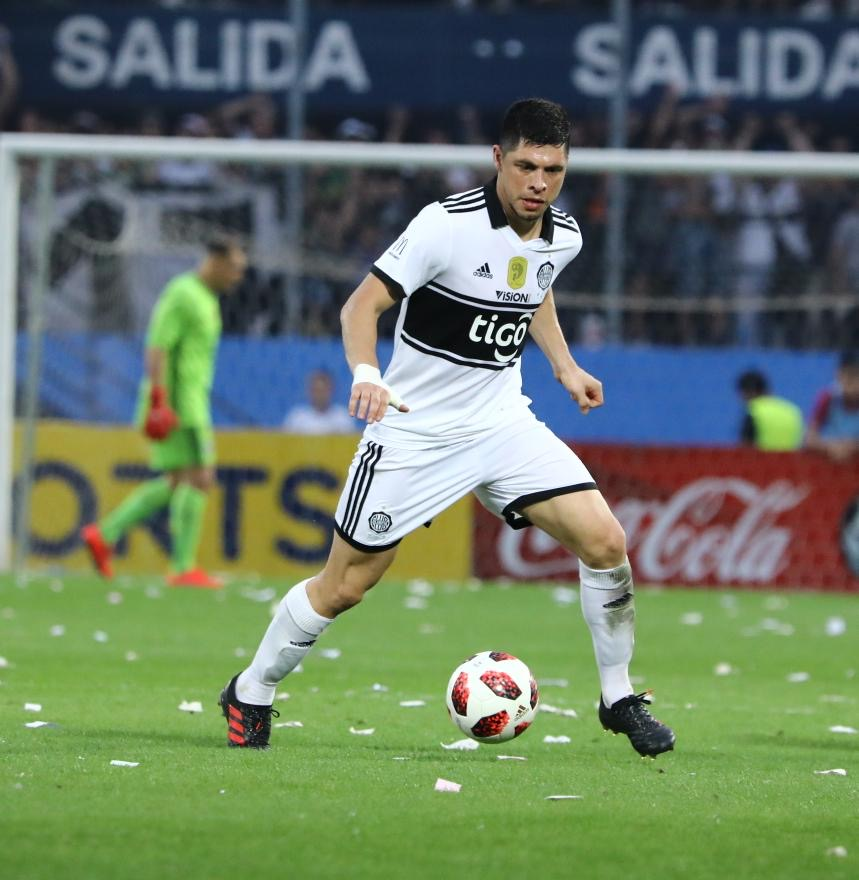
- Rojas with Olimpia in 2020

Personal information
- Full name: Juan Rodrigo Rojas Avelar
- Date of birth: 9 April 1988 (age 38)
- Place of birth: Fernando de la Mora, Paraguay
- Height: 1.79 m (5 ft 10 in)
- Position: Midfielder

Team information
- Current team: Rubio Ñu
- Number: 8

Youth career
- Olimpia

Senior career*
Years	Team	Apps	(Gls)
2006–2010	Olimpia	57	(1)
2010	→ River Plate (loan)	19	(0)
2011	Libertad	13	(0)
2011	Beerschot	5	(0)
2012–2013	O'Higgins	50	(11)
2013–2014	Universidad de Chile	33	(4)
2014	Monterrey	10	(0)
2015–2018	Cerro Porteño	120	(13)
2019–2021	Olimpia	72	(4)
2021–2022	Sol de América	38	(4)
2023–2024	Sportivo Luqueño	69	(7)
2025	Tembetary	31	(2)
2026–	Rubio Ñu	35	(0)

International career^{‡}
2009–	Paraguay	27	(0)
- * Club domestic league appearances and goals as of 24 September 2024 ‡ National team caps and goals as of 10 September 2020

Juan Rodrigo Rojas Avelar (born 9 April 1988) is a Paraguayan professional footballer who plays as a midfielder for Rubio Ñu.

On 19 July 2015, Paraguayan newspaper ExtraPRESS named Rojas one of the most expensive player in Paraguay.

== Career ==
=== Olimpia Asunción ===
Rojas was born in Fernando de la Mora. He started his career in the youth divisions of Olimpia and made his way to the first team in 2007. He became a regular starter for the team in 2009 scoring many goals and having great performances as a midfielder. Due to his good performances for Olimpia he was called up to the national team by Gerardo Martino. On 11 January 2010, River Plate signed the Paraguayan attacking midfielder on loan from Olimpia. He is a great midfielder with a strong personality and so he was recommended by Martino and Gregorio Perez.

=== River Plate ===
He made his River debut against the all time rival, Boca Juniors. While it was only a friendly pre-season match, Boca played with their usual starters. River, however, gave playing time to mostly youth talent along with veteran captain Matias Almeyda. Rojas' first half strike from just outside the box opened up what would be a 3–1 win over its archrivals.

=== O'Higgins ===
After a brief loan spell with Belgian club Beerschot, Rojas signed for mid-level Chilean team O'Higgins, slowly becoming an integral part of the team, being used both as a starter and off the bench in a variety of positions to contribute to the team's play-making and score several key goals. As of 23 April 2012, Rojas had 4 goals in 10 matches played (5 of them as a substitute).

== See also ==
- Players and Records in Paraguayan Football
