= Diego Haro =

Peruvian football referee (born 1982)

- Full name: Diego Mirko Haro Sueldo
- Born: 18 December 1982 (age 43); Peru

International
| Years | League | Role |
| 2013– | FIFA | Referee |

Diego Mirko Haro Sueldo (born 18 December 1982) is a Peruvian football referee who has been a full international referee for FIFA since 2013.

He was in the 2017 FIFA U-20 World Cup. Haro notably handed out seven yellow cards in the first half of a group stage match between the United States and Saudi Arabia.
