= 2019 Copa América squads =

The following is a list of squads for all 12 national teams that competed at the 2019 Copa América. Each national team had to submit a final squad of 23 players, 3 of whom had to be goalkeepers.

On 31 May 2019 CONMEBOL published the lists of the twelve teams.

== Group A ==
=== Brazil ===
Head coach: Tite

The 23-man squad was announced on 17 May 2019. On 6 June, Neymar withdrew due to an injury and was replaced by Willian.

No.	Pos.	Player	Date of birth (age)	Caps	Goals	Club
1	GK	Alisson	2 October 1992 (aged 26)	38	0	(The Football Association) Liverpool
2	DF	Thiago Silva	22 September 1984 (aged 34)	79	7	(French Football Federation) Paris Saint-Germain
3	DF	Miranda	7 September 1984 (aged 34)	57	3	(Italian Football Federation) Inter Milan
4	DF	Marquinhos	14 May 1994 (aged 25)	36	1	(French Football Federation) Paris Saint-Germain
5	MF	Casemiro	23 February 1992 (aged 27)	36	0	(Royal Spanish Football Federation) Real Madrid
6	DF	Filipe Luís	9 August 1985 (aged 33)	40	2	(Royal Spanish Football Federation) Atlético Madrid
7	FW	David Neres	3 March 1997 (aged 22)	3	1	(Royal Dutch Football Association) Ajax
8	MF	Arthur	12 August 1996 (aged 22)	10	0	(Royal Spanish Football Federation) Barcelona
9	FW	Gabriel Jesus	3 April 1997 (aged 22)	27	16	(The Football Association) Manchester City
10	MF	Willian	9 August 1988 (aged 30)	65	8	(The Football Association) Chelsea
11	MF	Philippe Coutinho	12 June 1992 (aged 27)	49	16	(Royal Spanish Football Federation) Barcelona
12	DF	Alex Sandro	26 January 1991 (aged 28)	15	1	(Italian Football Federation) Juventus
13	DF	Dani Alves (captain)	6 May 1983 (aged 36)	109	7	(French Football Federation) Paris Saint-Germain
14	DF	Éder Militão	18 January 1998 (aged 21)	4	0	(Portuguese Football Federation) Porto
15	MF	Allan	8 January 1991 (aged 28)	4	0	(Italian Football Federation) Napoli
16	GK	Cássio	6 June 1987 (aged 32)	1	0	(Brazilian Football Confederation) Corinthians
17	MF	Fernandinho	4 May 1985 (aged 34)	51	2	(The Football Association) Manchester City
18	MF	Lucas Paquetá	27 August 1997 (aged 21)	5	1	(Italian Football Federation) Milan
19	FW	Everton	22 March 1996 (aged 23)	6	1	(Brazilian Football Confederation) Grêmio
20	FW	Roberto Firmino	2 October 1991 (aged 27)	32	10	(The Football Association) Liverpool
21	FW	Richarlison	10 May 1997 (aged 22)	10	5	(The Football Association) Everton
22	DF	Fagner	11 June 1989 (aged 30)	9	0	(Brazilian Football Confederation) Corinthians
23	GK	Ederson	17 August 1993 (aged 25)	5	0	(The Football Association) Manchester City

=== Bolivia ===
Head coach: Eduardo Villegas

The 31-man provisional squad was released on 15 May 2019. The 23-man final squad was announced on 31 May 2019. On 11 June, forward Rodrigo Ramallo withdrew injured and was replaced by Ramiro Vaca.

No.	Pos.	Player	Date of birth (age)	Caps	Goals	Club
1	GK	Carlos Lampe	17 March 1987 (aged 32)	25	0	(Bolivian Football Federation) San José
2	DF	Saúl Torres	22 March 1990 (aged 29)	2	0	(Bolivian Football Federation) Nacional Potosí
3	MF	Alejandro Chumacero	22 April 1991 (aged 28)	40	2	(Mexican Football Federation) Puebla
4	DF	Luis Haquin	15 November 1997 (aged 21)	12	1	(Mexican Football Federation) Puebla
5	DF	Mario Cuéllar	5 May 1989 (aged 30)	2	0	(Bolivian Football Federation) Oriente Petrolero
6	MF	Erwin Saavedra	22 February 1996 (aged 23)	17	0	(Bolivian Football Federation) Bolívar
7	MF	Leonel Justiniano	2 July 1992 (aged 26)	16	0	(Bolivian Football Federation) Bolívar
8	DF	Diego Bejarano	24 August 1991 (aged 27)	25	2	(Bolivian Football Federation) Bolívar
9	FW	Marcelo Moreno	18 June 1987 (aged 31)	72	18	(Chinese Football Association) Shijiazhuang Ever Bright
10	MF	Samuel Galindo	18 April 1992 (aged 27)	7	0	(Bolivian Football Federation) Always Ready
11	FW	Leonardo Vaca	24 November 1995 (aged 23)	11	1	(Bolivian Football Federation) Blooming
12	GK	Rubén Cordano	16 October 1998 (aged 20)	1	0	(Bolivian Football Federation) Blooming
13	DF	José María Carrasco	16 August 1997 (aged 21)	0	0	(Bolivian Football Federation) Blooming
14	MF	Raúl Castro	19 August 1989 (aged 29)	18	0	(Bolivian Football Federation) The Strongest
15	MF	Paul Arano	23 February 1995 (aged 24)	0	0	(Bolivian Football Federation) Blooming
16	MF	Diego Wayar	15 October 1993 (aged 25)	2	0	(Bolivian Football Federation) The Strongest
17	DF	Marvin Bejarano (captain)	6 March 1988 (aged 31)	37	0	(Bolivian Football Federation) The Strongest
18	FW	Gilbert Álvarez	7 April 1992 (aged 27)	19	3	(Bolivian Football Federation) Jorge Wilstermann
19	MF	Ramiro Vaca	1 July 1999 (aged 19)	3	1	(Bolivian Football Federation) The Strongest
20	MF	Fernando Saucedo	15 March 1990 (aged 29)	5	0	(Bolivian Football Federation) Jorge Wilstermann
21	DF	Roberto Fernández	12 July 1999 (aged 19)	1	0	(Bolivian Football Federation) Blooming
22	DF	Adrián Jusino	9 July 1992 (aged 26)	3	0	(Bolivian Football Federation) Bolívar
23	GK	Javier Rojas	14 January 1996 (aged 23)	0	0	(Bolivian Football Federation) Nacional Potosí

=== Venezuela ===
Head coach: Rafael Dudamel

The 40-man provisional squad was announced on 10 May 2019. The 23-man final squad was announced on 30 May 2019. On 8 June, midfielder Adalberto Peñaranda was ruled out due to an injury and was replaced by Yeferson Soteldo.

No.	Pos.	Player	Date of birth (age)	Caps	Goals	Club
1	GK	Wuilker Faríñez	15 February 1998 (aged 21)	12	0	(Colombian Football Federation) Millonarios
2	DF	Mikel Villanueva	14 April 1993 (aged 26)	18	2	(Royal Spanish Football Federation) Gimnàstic
3	DF	Yordan Osorio	10 May 1994 (aged 25)	8	0	(Portuguese Football Federation) Vitória de Guimarães
4	DF	Jhon Chancellor	2 January 1992 (aged 27)	10	0	(Qatar Football Association) Al-Ahli
5	MF	Júnior Moreno	20 July 1993 (aged 25)	12	1	(United States Soccer Federation) D.C. United
6	MF	Yangel Herrera	7 January 1998 (aged 21)	10	1	(Royal Spanish Football Federation) Huesca
7	MF	Darwin Machís	7 February 1993 (aged 26)	14	2	(Royal Spanish Football Federation) Cádiz
8	MF	Tomás Rincón (captain)	13 January 1988 (aged 31)	93	1	(Italian Football Federation) Torino
9	FW	Fernando Aristeguieta	9 April 1992 (aged 27)	16	1	(Colombian Football Federation) América de Cali
10	MF	Jefferson Savarino	11 November 1996 (aged 22)	7	0	(United States Soccer Federation) Real Salt Lake
11	MF	Juanpi	24 January 1994 (aged 25)	13	1	(Royal Spanish Football Federation) Huesca
12	GK	Joel Graterol	13 February 1997 (aged 22)	0	0	(Venezuelan Football Federation) Zamora
13	MF	Luis Manuel Seijas	23 June 1986 (aged 32)	67	2	(Colombian Football Federation) Santa Fe
14	DF	Luis Mago	15 September 1994 (aged 24)	4	1	(Football Federation of Chile) Palestino
15	MF	Jhon Murillo	21 November 1995 (aged 23)	20	3	(Portuguese Football Federation) Tondela
16	DF	Roberto Rosales	20 November 1988 (aged 30)	73	1	(Royal Spanish Football Federation) Espanyol
17	FW	Josef Martínez	19 May 1993 (aged 26)	47	10	(United States Soccer Federation) Atlanta United FC
18	MF	Yeferson Soteldo	30 June 1997 (aged 21)	8	0	(Brazilian Football Confederation) Santos
19	MF	Arquímedes Figuera	6 October 1989 (aged 29)	22	1	(Venezuelan Football Federation) Deportivo La Guaira
20	DF	Ronald Hernández	21 September 1997 (aged 21)	5	0	(Norwegian Football Federation) Stabæk
21	DF	Rolf Feltscher	6 October 1990 (aged 28)	18	0	(United States Soccer Federation) LA Galaxy
22	GK	Rafael Romo	25 February 1990 (aged 29)	11	0	(Cyprus Football Association) APOEL
23	FW	Salomón Rondón	16 September 1989 (aged 29)	71	22	(The Football Association) Newcastle United

=== Peru ===
Head coach: (Argentina) Ricardo Gareca

The 40-man provisional squad was announced on 15 May 2019. The 23-man final squad was announced on 30 May 2019. On 11 June, Paolo Hurtado was ruled out due to injury and replaced by Josepmir Ballón.

No.	Pos.	Player	Date of birth (age)	Caps	Goals	Club
1	GK	Pedro Gallese	23 February 1990 (aged 29)	51	0	(Peruvian Football Federation) Alianza Lima
2	DF	Luis Abram	27 February 1996 (aged 23)	9	0	(Argentine Football Association) Vélez Sarsfield
3	DF	Aldo Corzo	20 May 1989 (aged 30)	29	0	(Peruvian Football Federation) Universitario
4	DF	Anderson Santamaría	10 January 1992 (aged 27)	12	0	(Mexican Football Federation) Atlas
5	DF	Miguel Araujo	24 October 1994 (aged 24)	15	0	(Argentine Football Association) Talleres
6	DF	Miguel Trauco	25 August 1992 (aged 26)	39	0	(Brazilian Football Confederation) Flamengo
7	MF	Josepmir Ballón	21 March 1988 (aged 31)	48	0	(Football Federation of Chile) Universidad de Concepción
8	MF	Christian Cueva	23 November 1991 (aged 27)	56	10	(Brazilian Football Confederation) Santos
9	FW	Paolo Guerrero (captain)	1 January 1984 (aged 35)	91	35	(Brazilian Football Confederation) Internacional
10	FW	Jefferson Farfán	26 October 1984 (aged 34)	92	26	(Russian Football Union) Lokomotiv Moscow
11	FW	Raúl Ruidíaz	25 July 1990 (aged 28)	39	4	(United States Soccer Federation) Seattle Sounders FC
12	GK	Carlos Cáceda	27 September 1991 (aged 27)	6	0	(Peruvian Football Federation) Melgar
13	MF	Renato Tapia	28 July 1995 (aged 23)	42	3	(Royal Dutch Football Association) Willem II
14	FW	Andy Polo	29 September 1994 (aged 24)	26	1	(United States Soccer Federation) Portland Timbers
15	DF	Carlos Zambrano	10 July 1989 (aged 29)	42	4	(Swiss Football Association) Basel
16	MF	Jesús Pretell	26 March 1999 (aged 20)	1	0	(Peruvian Football Federation) Sporting Cristal
17	DF	Luis Advíncula	2 March 1990 (aged 29)	79	1	(Royal Spanish Football Federation) Rayo Vallecano
18	FW	André Carrillo	14 June 1991 (aged 28)	60	6	(Saudi Arabian Football Federation) Al-Hilal
19	MF	Yoshimar Yotún	7 April 1990 (aged 29)	86	2	(Mexican Football Federation) Cruz Azul
20	MF	Edison Flores	15 May 1994 (aged 25)	43	11	(Mexican Football Federation) Morelia
21	GK	Patricio Álvarez	24 January 1994 (aged 25)	0	0	(Peruvian Football Federation) Sporting Cristal
22	DF	Alexander Callens	4 May 1992 (aged 27)	14	1	(United States Soccer Federation) New York City FC
23	MF	Christofer Gonzáles	12 October 1992 (aged 26)	12	1	(Peruvian Football Federation) Sporting Cristal

== Group B ==
=== Argentina ===
Head coach: Lionel Scaloni

The 40-man provisional squad was released on 15 May 2019. The 23-man final squad was announced on 20 May 2019. On 3 June midfielder Exequiel Palacios was replaced by Guido Pizarro due to injury. On 14 June goalkeeper Esteban Andrada was replaced by Juan Musso due to injury. Sergio Agüero replaced as vice-captain in place of Angel Di Maria.

No.	Pos.	Player	Date of birth (age)	Caps	Goals	Club
1	GK	Franco Armani	16 October 1986 (aged 32)	5	0	(Argentine Football Association) River Plate
2	DF	Juan Foyth	12 January 1998 (aged 21)	3	0	(The Football Association) Tottenham Hotspur
3	DF	Nicolás Tagliafico	31 August 1992 (aged 26)	14	0	(Royal Dutch Football Association) Ajax
4	DF	Renzo Saravia	16 June 1993 (aged 25)	4	0	(Argentine Football Association) Racing
5	MF	Leandro Paredes	29 June 1994 (aged 24)	12	1	(French Football Federation) Paris Saint-Germain
6	DF	Germán Pezzella	27 June 1991 (aged 27)	7	1	(Italian Football Federation) Fiorentina
7	MF	Roberto Pereyra	7 January 1991 (aged 28)	16	2	(The Football Association) Watford
8	MF	Marcos Acuña	28 October 1991 (aged 27)	18	0	(Portuguese Football Federation) Sporting CP
9	FW	Sergio Agüero (vice-captain)	2 June 1988 (aged 31)	90	38	(The Football Association) Manchester City
10	FW	Lionel Messi (captain)	24 June 1987 (aged 31)	130	67	(Royal Spanish Football Federation) Barcelona
11	MF	Ángel Di María	14 February 1988 (aged 31)	97	20	(French Football Federation) Paris Saint-Germain
12	GK	Agustín Marchesín	16 March 1988 (aged 31)	4	0	(Mexican Football Federation) América
13	DF	Ramiro Funes Mori	5 March 1991 (aged 28)	25	2	(Royal Spanish Football Federation) Villarreal
14	DF	Milton Casco	11 April 1988 (aged 31)	2	0	(Argentine Football Association) River Plate
15	MF	Guido Pizarro	26 February 1990 (aged 29)	2	0	(Mexican Football Federation) UANL
16	MF	Rodrigo De Paul	24 May 1994 (aged 25)	5	0	(Italian Football Federation) Udinese
17	DF	Nicolás Otamendi	12 February 1988 (aged 31)	60	4	(The Football Association) Manchester City
18	MF	Guido Rodríguez	12 April 1994 (aged 25)	3	0	(Mexican Football Federation) América
19	FW	Matías Suárez	9 May 1988 (aged 31)	3	0	(Argentine Football Association) River Plate
20	MF	Giovani Lo Celso	9 April 1996 (aged 23)	13	1	(Royal Spanish Football Federation) Real Betis
21	FW	Paulo Dybala	15 November 1993 (aged 25)	20	1	(Italian Football Federation) Juventus
22	FW	Lautaro Martínez	22 August 1997 (aged 21)	7	4	(Italian Football Federation) Inter Milan
23	GK	Juan Musso	6 May 1994 (aged 25)	1	0	(Italian Football Federation) Udinese

=== Colombia ===
Head coach: (Portugal) Carlos Queiroz

The 40-man provisional squad was announced on 15 May 2019. On 20 May, defender Luis Manuel Orejuela was replaced by Stefan Medina due to injury. The 23-man final squad was announced on 30 May 2019.

No.	Pos.	Player	Date of birth (age)	Caps	Goals	Club
1	GK	David Ospina	31 August 1988 (aged 30)	94	0	(Italian Football Federation) Napoli
2	DF	Cristián Zapata	30 September 1986 (aged 32)	56	2	(Italian Football Federation) Milan
3	DF	Stefan Medina	14 June 1992 (aged 27)	10	0	(Mexican Football Federation) Monterrey
4	DF	Santiago Arias	13 January 1992 (aged 27)	48	0	(Royal Spanish Football Federation) Atlético Madrid
5	MF	Wilmar Barrios	16 October 1993 (aged 25)	19	0	(Russian Football Union) Zenit Saint Petersburg
6	DF	William Tesillo	2 February 1990 (aged 29)	4	0	(Mexican Football Federation) León
7	FW	Duván Zapata	1 April 1991 (aged 28)	7	1	(Italian Football Federation) Atalanta
8	MF	Edwin Cardona	8 December 1992 (aged 26)	33	5	(Mexican Football Federation) Pachuca
9	FW	Radamel Falcao (captain)	10 February 1986 (aged 33)	83	33	(French Football Federation) Monaco
10	MF	James Rodríguez	12 July 1991 (aged 27)	70	22	(German Football Association) Bayern Munich
11	MF	Juan Cuadrado	26 May 1988 (aged 31)	78	8	(Italian Football Federation) Juventus
12	GK	Camilo Vargas	9 March 1989 (aged 30)	6	0	(Colombian Football Federation) Deportivo Cali
13	DF	Yerry Mina	23 September 1994 (aged 24)	17	6	(The Football Association) Everton
14	FW	Luis Díaz	13 January 1997 (aged 22)	3	1	(Colombian Football Federation) Junior
15	MF	Mateus Uribe	21 March 1991 (aged 28)	17	0	(Mexican Football Federation) América
16	MF	Jefferson Lerma	25 October 1994 (aged 24)	10	0	(The Football Association) AFC Bournemouth
17	DF	Cristian Borja	18 February 1993 (aged 26)	3	0	(Portuguese Football Federation) Sporting CP
18	MF	Gustavo Cuéllar	14 October 1992 (aged 26)	5	0	(Brazilian Football Confederation) Flamengo
19	FW	Luis Muriel	16 April 1991 (aged 28)	24	2	(Italian Football Federation) Fiorentina
20	FW	Roger Martínez	23 June 1994 (aged 24)	7	2	(Mexican Football Federation) América
21	DF	Jhon Lucumí	26 June 1998 (aged 20)	0	0	(Royal Belgian Football Association) Genk
22	GK	Álvaro Montero	29 March 1995 (aged 24)	0	0	(Colombian Football Federation) Deportes Tolima
23	DF	Davinson Sánchez	12 June 1996 (aged 23)	19	0	(The Football Association) Tottenham Hotspur

=== Paraguay ===
Head coach: (Argentina) Eduardo Berizzo

The 40-man provisional squad was announced on 13 May 2019. Provisional squad was reduced to 39 players on 17 May after Roque Santa Cruz withdrew injured. The 23-man final squad was announced on 29 May 2019. On 10 June, midfielder Richard Ortiz was ruled out due to an injury and replaced by Richard Sánchez.

No.	Pos.	Player	Date of birth (age)	Caps	Goals	Club
1	GK	Antony Silva	27 February 1984 (aged 35)	27	0	(Argentine Football Association) Huracán
2	DF	Iván Piris	10 March 1989 (aged 30)	25	0	(Paraguayan Football Association) Libertad
3	DF	Juan Escobar	3 July 1995 (aged 23)	2	0	(Paraguayan Football Association) Cerro Porteño
4	DF	Fabián Balbuena	23 August 1991 (aged 27)	9	0	(The Football Association) West Ham United
5	DF	Bruno Valdez	6 October 1992 (aged 26)	24	1	(Mexican Football Federation) América
6	MF	Richard Sánchez	29 March 1996 (aged 23)	3	0	(Paraguayan Football Association) Olimpia
7	FW	Óscar Cardozo	20 May 1983 (aged 36)	50	10	(Paraguayan Football Association) Libertad
8	MF	Rodrigo Rojas	9 April 1988 (aged 31)	19	0	(Paraguayan Football Association) Olimpia
9	FW	Federico Santander	4 June 1991 (aged 28)	17	2	(Italian Football Federation) Bologna
10	FW	Derlis González	20 March 1994 (aged 25)	32	5	(Brazilian Football Confederation) Santos
11	FW	Juan Iturbe	4 June 1993 (aged 26)	9	0	(Mexican Football Federation) UNAM
12	GK	Gatito Fernández	29 March 1988 (aged 31)	7	0	(Brazilian Football Confederation) Botafogo
13	DF	Júnior Alonso	9 February 1993 (aged 26)	20	1	(Argentine Football Association) Boca Juniors
14	DF	Iván Torres	27 February 1991 (aged 28)	0	0	(Paraguayan Football Association) Olimpia
15	DF	Gustavo Gómez (captain)	6 May 1993 (aged 26)	31	2	(Brazilian Football Confederation) Palmeiras
16	MF	Celso Ortiz	26 January 1989 (aged 30)	16	0	(Mexican Football Federation) Monterrey
17	MF	Hernán Pérez	25 February 1989 (aged 30)	33	2	(Royal Spanish Football Federation) Espanyol
18	DF	Santiago Arzamendia	5 May 1998 (aged 21)	1	0	(Paraguayan Football Association) Cerro Porteño
19	FW	Cecilio Domínguez	11 August 1994 (aged 24)	13	0	(Argentine Football Association) Independiente
20	MF	Matías Rojas	3 November 1995 (aged 23)	2	0	(Argentine Football Association) Defensa y Justicia
21	FW	Óscar Romero	4 July 1992 (aged 26)	38	3	(Chinese Football Association) Shanghai Shenhua
22	GK	Alfredo Aguilar	18 July 1988 (aged 30)	1	0	(Paraguayan Football Association) Olimpia
23	MF	Miguel Almirón	10 February 1994 (aged 25)	16	0	(The Football Association) Newcastle United

=== Qatar ===
Head coach: (Spain) Félix Sánchez

The 23-man final squad was announced on 30 May 2019.

No.	Pos.	Player	Date of birth (age)	Caps	Goals	Club
1	GK	Saad Al-Sheeb	19 February 1990 (aged 29)	52	0	(Qatar Football Association) Al-Sadd
2	DF	Pedro Miguel	6 August 1990 (aged 28)	44	1	(Qatar Football Association) Al-Sadd
3	DF	Abdelkarim Hassan	28 August 1993 (aged 25)	83	10	(Qatar Football Association) Al-Sadd
4	DF	Al-Mahdi Ali Mukhtar	2 March 1992 (aged 27)	35	3	(Qatar Football Association) Al-Gharafa
5	DF	Tarek Salman	5 December 1997 (aged 21)	19	0	(Qatar Football Association) Al-Sadd
6	MF	Abdulaziz Hatem	28 October 1990 (aged 28)	56	3	(Qatar Football Association) Al-Gharafa
7	FW	Ahmed Alaaeldin	31 January 1993 (aged 26)	23	1	(Qatar Football Association) Al-Gharafa
8	DF	Hamid Ismail	16 June 1986 (aged 32)	62	1	(Qatar Football Association) Al-Sadd
9	MF	Abdullah Al-Ahrak	10 May 1997 (aged 22)	3	0	(Qatar Football Association) Al-Duhail
10	FW	Hassan Al-Haydos (captain)	11 December 1990 (aged 28)	120	26	(Qatar Football Association) Al-Sadd
11	FW	Akram Afif	18 November 1996 (aged 22)	46	12	(Qatar Football Association) Al-Sadd
12	MF	Karim Boudiaf	16 September 1990 (aged 28)	68	4	(Qatar Football Association) Al-Duhail
13	DF	Tameem Al-Muhaza	21 July 1996 (aged 22)	1	0	(Qatar Football Association) Al-Gharafa
14	MF	Salem Al-Hajri	10 April 1996 (aged 23)	9	0	(Qatar Football Association) Al-Sadd
15	DF	Bassam Al-Rawi	16 December 1997 (aged 21)	19	2	(Qatar Football Association) Al-Duhail
16	MF	Boualem Khoukhi	9 July 1990 (aged 28)	60	16	(Qatar Football Association) Al-Sadd
17	MF	Ahmed Moein	20 October 1995 (aged 23)	4	0	(Qatar Football Association) Qatar SC
18	MF	Ahmed Fatehi	25 January 1993 (aged 26)	10	0	(Qatar Football Association) Al-Arabi
19	FW	Almoez Ali	19 August 1996 (aged 22)	39	19	(Qatar Football Association) Al-Duhail
20	MF	Ali Afif	20 January 1988 (aged 31)	54	10	(Qatar Football Association) Al-Duhail
21	GK	Yousef Hassan	24 May 1996 (aged 23)	6	0	(Qatar Football Association) Al-Gharafa
22	GK	Mohammed Al-Bakri	28 March 1997 (aged 22)	2	0	(Qatar Football Association) Al-Khor
23	DF	Assim Madibo	22 October 1996 (aged 22)	21	0	(Qatar Football Association) Al-Duhail

== Group C ==
=== Uruguay ===
Head coach: Óscar Tabárez

The 23-man final squad was announced on 30 May 2019.

No.	Pos.	Player	Date of birth (age)	Caps	Goals	Club
1	GK	Fernando Muslera	16 June 1986 (aged 32)	107	0	(Turkish Football Federation) Galatasaray
2	DF	José Giménez	20 January 1995 (aged 24)	49	7	(Royal Spanish Football Federation) Atlético Madrid
3	DF	Diego Godín (captain)	16 February 1986 (aged 33)	126	8	(Royal Spanish Football Federation) Atlético Madrid
4	DF	Giovanni González	20 September 1994 (aged 24)	2	0	(Uruguayan Football Association) Peñarol
5	MF	Matías Vecino	24 August 1991 (aged 27)	33	3	(Italian Football Federation) Inter Milan
6	MF	Rodrigo Bentancur	25 June 1997 (aged 21)	18	0	(Italian Football Federation) Juventus
7	MF	Nicolás Lodeiro	21 March 1989 (aged 30)	56	4	(United States Soccer Federation) Seattle Sounders FC
8	MF	Nahitan Nández	28 December 1995 (aged 23)	22	0	(Argentine Football Association) Boca Juniors
9	FW	Luis Suárez	24 January 1987 (aged 32)	106	55	(Royal Spanish Football Federation) Barcelona
10	MF	Giorgian de Arrascaeta	1 June 1994 (aged 25)	19	2	(Brazilian Football Confederation) Flamengo
11	FW	Cristhian Stuani	12 October 1986 (aged 32)	48	8	(Royal Spanish Football Federation) Girona
12	GK	Martín Campaña	29 May 1989 (aged 30)	3	0	(Argentine Football Association) Independiente
13	DF	Marcelo Saracchi	23 April 1998 (aged 21)	4	0	(German Football Association) RB Leipzig
14	MF	Lucas Torreira	11 February 1996 (aged 23)	15	0	(The Football Association) Arsenal
15	MF	Federico Valverde	22 July 1998 (aged 20)	9	1	(Royal Spanish Football Federation) Real Madrid
16	MF	Gastón Pereiro	11 June 1995 (aged 24)	7	4	(Royal Dutch Football Association) PSV Eindhoven
17	DF	Diego Laxalt	7 February 1993 (aged 26)	16	0	(Italian Football Federation) Milan
18	FW	Maxi Gómez	14 August 1996 (aged 22)	11	1	(Royal Spanish Football Federation) Celta Vigo
19	DF	Sebastián Coates	7 October 1990 (aged 28)	34	1	(Portuguese Football Federation) Sporting CP
20	FW	Jonathan Rodríguez	6 July 1993 (aged 25)	14	2	(Mexican Football Federation) Cruz Azul
21	FW	Edinson Cavani	14 February 1987 (aged 32)	109	46	(French Football Federation) Paris Saint-Germain
22	DF	Martín Cáceres	7 April 1987 (aged 32)	88	4	(Italian Football Federation) Juventus
23	GK	Martín Silva	25 March 1983 (aged 36)	11	0	(Paraguayan Football Association) Libertad

=== Ecuador ===
Head coach: (Colombia) Hernán Darío Gómez

The 40-man provisional squad was released on 17 May 2019. The 23-man final squad was released on 20 May 2019.

No.	Pos.	Player	Date of birth (age)	Caps	Goals	Club
1	GK	Máximo Banguera	16 December 1985 (aged 33)	35	0	(Ecuadorian Football Federation) Barcelona SC
2	DF	Arturo Mina	8 October 1990 (aged 28)	19	1	(Turkish Football Federation) Yeni Malatyaspor
3	DF	Robert Arboleda	22 October 1991 (aged 27)	13	1	(Brazilian Football Confederation) São Paulo
4	DF	Pedro Velasco	26 September 1993 (aged 25)	6	0	(Ecuadorian Football Federation) Barcelona SC
5	MF	Renato Ibarra	20 January 1991 (aged 28)	42	1	(Mexican Football Federation) América
6	DF	Cristian Ramírez	12 August 1994 (aged 24)	18	1	(Russian Football Union) Krasnodar
7	MF	Romario Ibarra	24 September 1994 (aged 24)	7	3	(United States Soccer Federation) Minnesota United FC
8	MF	Carlos Gruezo	19 April 1995 (aged 24)	23	0	(United States Soccer Federation) FC Dallas
9	FW	Carlos Garcés	1 March 1990 (aged 29)	1	0	(Ecuadorian Football Federation) Delfín
10	FW	Ángel Mena	21 January 1988 (aged 31)	13	1	(Mexican Football Federation) León
11	MF	Ayrton Preciado	17 July 1994 (aged 24)	11	0	(Mexican Football Federation) Santos Laguna
12	GK	Pedro Ortíz	19 February 1990 (aged 29)	0	0	(Ecuadorian Football Federation) Delfín
13	FW	Enner Valencia	4 November 1989 (aged 29)	46	27	(Mexican Football Federation) UANL
14	DF	Xavier Arreaga	28 September 1994 (aged 24)	1	0	(United States Soccer Federation) Seattle Sounders FC
15	MF	Jefferson Intriago	4 June 1996 (aged 23)	5	0	(Ecuadorian Football Federation) LDU Quito
16	MF	Antonio Valencia	4 August 1985 (aged 33)	93	11	(The Football Association) Manchester United
17	DF	José Quintero	20 June 1990 (aged 28)	1	0	(Ecuadorian Football Federation) LDU Quito
18	MF	Jefferson Orejuela	14 February 1993 (aged 26)	15	0	(Ecuadorian Football Federation) LDU Quito
19	DF	Beder Caicedo	13 May 1992 (aged 27)	4	0	(Ecuadorian Football Federation) Barcelona SC
20	MF	Andrés Chicaiza	3 April 1992 (aged 27)	0	0	(Ecuadorian Football Federation) LDU Quito
21	DF	Gabriel Achilier (captain)	24 March 1985 (aged 34)	51	1	(Mexican Football Federation) Morelia
22	GK	Alexander Domínguez	5 June 1987 (aged 32)	48	0	(Argentine Football Association) Vélez Sarsfield
23	MF	Sebas Méndez	26 April 1997 (aged 22)	7	0	(United States Soccer Federation) Orlando City SC

=== Japan ===
Head coach: Hajime Moriyasu

The 23-men squad was released on 24 May 2019.

No.	Pos.	Player	Date of birth (age)	Caps	Goals	Club
1	GK	Eiji Kawashima	20 March 1983 (aged 36)	88	0	(French Football Federation) Strasbourg
2	DF	Daiki Sugioka	8 September 1998 (aged 20)	0	0	(Japan Football Association) Shonan Bellmare
3	MF	Yuta Nakayama	16 February 1997 (aged 22)	1	0	(Royal Dutch Football Association) PEC Zwolle
4	DF	Ko Itakura	27 January 1997 (aged 22)	0	0	(Royal Dutch Football Association) Groningen
5	DF	Naomichi Ueda	24 October 1994 (aged 24)	6	0	(Royal Belgian Football Association) Cercle Brugge
6	MF	Kota Watanabe	18 October 1998 (aged 20)	0	0	(Japan Football Association) Tokyo Verdy
7	MF	Gaku Shibasaki (captain)	28 May 1992 (aged 27)	34	3	(Royal Spanish Football Federation) Getafe
8	MF	Tatsuya Ito	26 June 1997 (aged 21)	0	0	(German Football Association) Hamburger SV
9	FW	Daizen Maeda	20 October 1997 (aged 21)	0	0	(Japan Football Association) Matsumoto Yamaga
10	MF	Shoya Nakajima	23 August 1994 (aged 24)	8	3	(Qatar Football Association) Al-Duhail
11	MF	Koji Miyoshi	26 March 1997 (aged 22)	0	0	(Japan Football Association) Yokohama F. Marinos
12	GK	Ryosuke Kojima	30 January 1997 (aged 22)	0	0	(Japan Football Association) Oita Trinita
13	FW	Ayase Ueda	28 August 1998 (aged 20)	0	0	(Japan Football Association) Hosei University
14	DF	Teruki Hara	30 July 1998 (aged 20)	0	0	(Japan Football Association) Sagan Tosu
15	DF	Daiki Suga	10 September 1998 (aged 20)	0	0	(Japan Football Association) Hokkaido Consadole Sapporo
16	DF	Takehiro Tomiyasu	5 November 1998 (aged 20)	10	1	(Royal Belgian Football Association) Sint-Truiden
17	MF	Taishi Matsumoto	22 August 1998 (aged 20)	0	0	(Japan Football Association) Sanfrecce Hiroshima
18	FW	Shinji Okazaki	16 April 1986 (aged 33)	116	50	(The Football Association) Leicester City
19	DF	Tomoki Iwata	7 April 1997 (aged 22)	0	0	(Japan Football Association) Oita Trinita
20	MF	Hiroki Abe	28 January 1999 (aged 20)	0	0	(Japan Football Association) Kashima Antlers
21	MF	Takefusa Kubo	4 June 2001 (aged 18)	0	0	(Japan Football Association) FC Tokyo
22	DF	Yugo Tatsuta	21 June 1998 (aged 20)	0	0	(Japan Football Association) Shimizu S-Pulse
23	GK	Keisuke Osako	28 July 1999 (aged 19)	0	0	(Japan Football Association) Sanfrecce Hiroshima

=== Chile ===
Head coach: (Colombia) Reinaldo Rueda

The 23-man squad was released on 26 May 2019.

No.	Pos.	Player	Date of birth (age)	Caps	Goals	Club
1	GK	Gabriel Arias	13 September 1987 (aged 31)	5	0	(Argentine Football Association) Racing
2	DF	Igor Lichnovsky	7 March 1994 (aged 25)	5	0	(Mexican Football Federation) Cruz Azul
3	DF	Guillermo Maripán	6 May 1994 (aged 25)	15	2	(Royal Spanish Football Federation) Alavés
4	DF	Mauricio Isla	12 June 1988 (aged 31)	107	4	(Turkish Football Federation) Fenerbahçe
5	DF	Paulo Díaz	25 August 1994 (aged 24)	16	0	(Saudi Arabian Football Federation) Al-Ahli
6	MF	José Pedro Fuenzalida	22 February 1985 (aged 34)	47	3	(Football Federation of Chile) Universidad Catolica
7	FW	Alexis Sánchez	19 December 1988 (aged 30)	124	41	(The Football Association) Manchester United
8	MF	Arturo Vidal	22 May 1987 (aged 32)	107	26	(Royal Spanish Football Federation) Barcelona
9	FW	Nicolás Castillo	14 February 1993 (aged 26)	20	4	(Mexican Football Federation) América
10	MF	Diego Valdés	30 January 1994 (aged 25)	10	1	(Mexican Football Federation) Santos Laguna
11	FW	Eduardo Vargas	20 November 1989 (aged 29)	82	36	(Mexican Football Federation) UANL
12	GK	Brayan Cortés	11 March 1995 (aged 24)	2	0	(Football Federation of Chile) Colo-Colo
13	MF	Erick Pulgar	15 January 1994 (aged 25)	15	2	(Italian Football Federation) Bologna
14	MF	Esteban Pavez	1 May 1990 (aged 29)	4	0	(Football Federation of Chile) Colo-Colo
15	DF	Jean Beausejour	1 June 1984 (aged 35)	101	6	(Football Federation of Chile) Universidad de Chile
16	MF	Pablo Hernández	24 October 1986 (aged 32)	25	3	(Argentine Football Association) Independiente
17	DF	Gary Medel (captain)	3 August 1987 (aged 31)	118	7	(Turkish Football Federation) Beşiktaş
18	DF	Gonzalo Jara	29 August 1985 (aged 33)	112	3	(Argentine Football Association) Estudiantes
19	FW	Junior Fernandes	10 April 1988 (aged 31)	16	0	(Turkish Football Federation) Alanyaspor
20	MF	Charles Aránguiz	17 April 1989 (aged 30)	69	7	(German Football Association) Bayer Leverkusen
21	DF	Óscar Opazo	18 October 1990 (aged 28)	6	1	(Football Federation of Chile) Colo-Colo
22	FW	Ángelo Sagal	18 April 1993 (aged 26)	16	2	(Mexican Football Federation) Pachuca
23	GK	Yerko Urra	9 July 1996 (aged 22)	0	0	(Football Federation of Chile) Huachipato

== Statistics ==
=== Age ===
All ages are set to 14 June 2019, the opening day of the tournament.

==== Players ====
- Oldest: (Japan) Eiji Kawashima (36 years, 86 days)
- Youngest: (Japan) Takefusa Kubo (18 years, 10 days)

==== Goalkeepers ====
- Oldest: (Japan) Eiji Kawashima (36 years, 86 days)
- Youngest: (Japan) Keisuke Osako (19 years, 321 days)

==== Captains ====
- Oldest: (Brazil) Dani Alves (36 years, 39 days)
- Youngest: (Paraguay) Gustavo Gómez (26 years, 39 days)

=== Player representation ===
==== By club ====
Clubs are ordered alphabetically: first by country, then by club name.

Players	Clubs
9	(Qatar) Al-Sadd
7	(Mexico) América (Qatar) Al-Duhail
6	(France) Paris Saint-Germain
5	(Bolivia) Blooming (England) Manchester City (Italy) Juventus (Qatar) Al-Gharafa (Spain) Barcelona
4	(Bolivia) Bolívar (Bolivia) The Strongest (Ecuador) LDU Quito (Paraguay) Olimpia (Spain) Atlético Madrid
3	(Argentina) Independiente (Argentina) River Plate (Brazil) Flamengo (Brazil) Santos (Chile) Colo-Colo (Ecuador) Barcelona SC (Italy) Inter Milan (Italy) Milan (Mexico) Cruz Azul (Mexico) UANL (Paraguay) Libertad (Peru) Sporting Cristal (Portugal) Sporting CP (United States) Seattle Sounders FC
2	(Argentina) Boca Juniors (Argentina) Racing (Argentina) Vélez Sarsfield (Bolivia) Jorge Wilstermann (Bolivia) Nacional Potosí (Brazil) Botafogo (Brazil) Corinthians (Ecuador) Delfín (England) Arsenal (England) Everton (England) Liverpool (England) Manchester United (England) Newcastle United (England) Tottenham Hotspur (Italy) Bologna (Italy) Fiorentina (Italy) Napoli (Italy) Udinese (Japan) Oita Trinita (Japan) Sanfrecce Hiroshima (Mexico) León (Mexico) Monterrey (Mexico) Morelia (Mexico) Pachuca (Mexico) Puebla (Mexico) Santos Laguna (Netherlands) Ajax (Paraguay) Cerro Porteño (Spain) Espanyol (Spain) Huesca (Spain) Real Madrid

==== By club nationality ====
Nations in bold are represented by their national teams in the tournament.

Players	Clubs
27	Mexico
25	**Qatar**
24	Spain
22	England
20	**Bolivia**; Italy
16	**Argentina**
14	**Brazil**; **Japan**
12	United States
9	**Ecuador**; **Paraguay**
8	**Chile**; France
6	**Colombia**; Netherlands; **Peru**; Portugal
5	Turkey
4	Germany
3	Belgium; Russia
2	China; Saudi Arabia; **Venezuela**
1	Cyprus; Norway; Switzerland; **Uruguay**

==== By club confederation ====
Nations in bold are represented by their national teams in the tournament.

Players	Clubs
104	UEFA
91	CONMEBOL
43	AFC
39	CONCACAF
0	CAF; OFC
