= 2019 Copa América Group A =

Football tournament group stage

Group A of the 2019 Copa América took place from 14 to 22 June 2019. The group consisted of Bolivia, hosts Brazil, Peru, and Venezuela.

Brazil and Venezuela as the top two teams, along with Peru as one of the two best third-placed teams, advanced to the quarter-finals.

== Teams ==
Draw position	Team	Pot	Appearance	Previous best performance	FIFA Rankings	
Draw position	Team	Pot	Appearance	Previous best performance	December 2018 (Note: The rankings of December 2018 were used for seeding for the final draw.)	June 2019
A1	Brazil (hosts)	1	36th	Winners (1919, 1922, 1949, 1989, 1997, 1999, 2004, 2007)	3	3
A2	Bolivia	4	27th	Winners (1963)	59	62
A3	Venezuela	3	18th	Fourth place (2011)	31	33
A4	Peru	2	32nd	Winners (1939, 1975)	20	21

== Standings ==
Pos	Team	Pld	W	D	L	GF	GA	GD	Pts	Qualification
1	Brazil (H)	3	2	1	0	8	0	+8	7	Advance to knockout stage
2	Venezuela	3	1	2	0	3	1	+2	5	Advance to knockout stage
3	Peru	3	1	1	1	3	6	−3	4	Advance to knockout stage
4	Bolivia	3	0	0	3	2	9	−7	0	

Source: CONMEBOL
Rules for classification: Tiebreakers
(H) Hosts

In the quarter-finals:

- The winners of Group A, Brazil, advanced to play the third-placed team of Group B, Paraguay.
- The runners-up of Group A, Venezuela, advanced to play the runners-up of Group B, Argentina.
- The third-placed team of Group A, Peru, advanced as one of the two best third-placed teams to play the winners of Group C, Uruguay.

== Matches ==
=== Brazil vs Bolivia ===
14 June 2019
21:30

Brazil	3–0	Bolivia
Coutinho 50' (pen.), 53'; Everton 85'	Report

Estádio do Morumbi, São Paulo
Attendance: 47,260
Referee: Néstor Pitana (Argentina)

Brazil	Bolivia

GK	1	Alisson
RB	13	Dani Alves (c)
CB	4	Marquinhos
CB	2	Thiago Silva
LB	6	Filipe Luís
CM	5	Casemiro
CM	17	Fernandinho
CM	11	Philippe Coutinho	(yellow card) 66'
RF	21	Richarlison		(substituted off) 84'
CF	20	Roberto Firmino		(substituted off) 65'
LF	7	David Neres		(substituted off) 81'
Substitutions:
FW	9	Gabriel Jesus		(substituted on) 65'
FW	19	Everton		(substituted on) 81'
MF	10	Willian		(substituted on) 84'
Manager:
Tite

GK	1	Carlos Lampe
RB	8	Diego Bejarano
CB	4	Luis Haquin
CB	22	Adrián Jusino
LB	17	Marvin Bejarano (c)
RM	6	Erwin Saavedra		(substituted off) 64'
CM	7	Leonel Justiniano
CM	20	Fernando Saucedo	(yellow card) 20'	(substituted off) 59'
LM	3	Alejandro Chumacero
SS	14	Raúl Castro		(substituted off) 75'
CF	9	Marcelo Moreno
Substitutions:
MF	16	Diego Wayar		(substituted on) 59'
FW	11	Leonardo Vaca		(substituted on) 64'
MF	19	Ramiro Vaca		(substituted on) 75'
Manager:
Eduardo Villegas

Man of the Match:
Philippe Coutinho (Brazil)

Assistant referees:
Hernán Maidana (Argentina)
Juan Pablo Belatti (Argentina)
Fourth official:
Roddy Zambrano (Ecuador)
Video assistant referee:
Patricio Loustau (Argentina)
Assistant video assistant referees:
Fernando Rapallini (Argentina)
Ezequiel Brailovsky (Argentina)

=== Venezuela vs Peru ===
15 June 2019
16:00

Venezuela	0–0	Peru
	Report

Arena do Grêmio, Porto Alegre
Attendance: 13,370
Referee: Wilmar Roldán (Colombia)

Venezuela	Peru

GK	1	Wuilker Faríñez
RB	16	Roberto Rosales
CB	4	Jhon Chancellor
CB	2	Mikel Villanueva
LB	14	Luis Mago	(yellow card) 6' (yellow-red card) 75'
DM	8	Tomás Rincón (c)
CM	5	Júnior Moreno		(substituted off) 78'
CM	6	Yangel Herrera	(yellow card) 82'
RW	15	Jhon Murillo		(substituted off) 84'
LW	10	Jefferson Savarino		(substituted off) 69'
CF	23	Salomón Rondón
Substitutions:
MF	7	Darwin Machís		(substituted on) 69'
DF	20	Ronald Hernández		(substituted on) 78'
MF	18	Yeferson Soteldo		(substituted on) 84'
Manager:
Rafael Dudamel

GK	1	Pedro Gallese
RB	17	Luis Advíncula
CB	15	Carlos Zambrano
CB	2	Luis Abram
LB	6	Miguel Trauco
CM	19	Yoshimar Yotún		(substituted off) 67'
CM	13	Renato Tapia	(yellow card) 26'
CM	23	Christofer Gonzáles		(substituted off) 88'
RF	10	Jefferson Farfán
CF	9	Paolo Guerrero (c)
LF	8	Christian Cueva		(substituted off) 46'
Substitutions:
MF	20	Edison Flores		(substituted on) 46'
FW	14	Andy Polo		(substituted on) 67'
FW	18	André Carrillo	(yellow card) 90+3'	(substituted on) 88'
Manager:
(Argentina) Ricardo Gareca

Man of the Match:
Paolo Guerrero (Peru)

Assistant referees:
Alexander Guzmán (Colombia)
Jhon Alexander León (Colombia)
Fourth official:
Carlos Orbe (Ecuador)
Video assistant referee:
Leodán González (Uruguay)
Assistant video assistant referees:
Andrés Rojas (Colombia)
Christian Lescano (Ecuador)

=== Bolivia vs Peru ===
18 June 2019
18:30

Bolivia	1–3	Peru
Moreno 28' (pen.)	Report	Guerrero 45'; Farfán 55'; Flores 90+6'

Estádio do Maracanã, Rio de Janeiro
Attendance: 26,346
Referee: Roddy Zambrano (Ecuador)

Bolivia	Peru

GK	1	Carlos Lampe
RB	8	Diego Bejarano
CB	4	Luis Haquin	(yellow card) 82'
CB	22	Adrián Jusino
LB	17	Marvin Bejarano (c)
RM	6	Erwin Saavedra		(substituted off) 73'
CM	7	Leonel Justiniano
CM	20	Fernando Saucedo		(substituted off) 71'
LM	3	Alejandro Chumacero	(yellow card) 30'
SS	14	Raúl Castro		(substituted off) 80'
CF	9	Marcelo Moreno
Substitutions:
DF	21	Roberto Fernández	(yellow card) 72'	(substituted on) 71'
FW	11	Leonardo Vaca		(substituted on) 73'
FW	18	Gilbert Álvarez		(substituted on) 80'
Manager:
Eduardo Villegas

GK	1	Pedro Gallese
RB	17	Luis Advíncula
CB	15	Carlos Zambrano	(yellow card) 27'	(substituted off) 85'
CB	2	Luis Abram
LB	6	Miguel Trauco
CM	13	Renato Tapia
CM	19	Yoshimar Yotún
RW	14	Andy Polo
AM	10	Jefferson Farfán
LW	8	Christian Cueva		(substituted off) 79'
CF	9	Paolo Guerrero (c)	(yellow card) 42'	(substituted off) 90+3'
Substitutions:
MF	20	Edison Flores		(substituted on) 79'
DF	5	Miguel Araujo		(substituted on) 85'
MF	23	Christofer Gonzáles		(substituted on) 90+3'
Manager:
(Argentina) Ricardo Gareca

Man of the Match:
Paolo Guerrero (Peru)

Assistant referees:
Christian Lescano (Ecuador)
Byron Romero (Ecuador)
Fourth official:
Piero Maza (Chile)
Video assistant referee:
Esteban Ostojich (Uruguay)
Assistant video assistant referees:
Nicolás Gallo (Colombia)
Hernán Maidana (Argentina)

=== Brazil vs Venezuela ===
18 June 2019
21:30

Brazil	0–0	Venezuela
	Report

Itaipava Arena Fonte Nova, Salvador
Attendance: 42,587
Referee: Julio Bascuñán (Chile)

Brazil	Venezuela

GK	1	Alisson
RB	13	Dani Alves (c)
CB	4	Marquinhos
CB	2	Thiago Silva
LB	6	Filipe Luís
CM	5	Casemiro	(yellow card) 41'	(substituted off) 57'
CM	8	Arthur
RW	11	Philippe Coutinho
AM	7	David Neres		(substituted off) 72'
LW	21	Richarlison		(substituted off) 46'
CF	20	Roberto Firmino
Substitutions:
FW	9	Gabriel Jesus		(substituted on) 46'
MF	17	Fernandinho		(substituted on) 57'
FW	19	Everton		(substituted on) 72'
Manager:
Tite

GK	1	Wuilker Faríñez
RB	20	Ronald Hernández
CB	3	Yordan Osorio
CB	2	Mikel Villanueva
LB	16	Roberto Rosales
DM	5	Júnior Moreno
RM	15	Jhon Murillo	(yellow card) 37'
CM	6	Yangel Herrera		(substituted off) 66'
CM	8	Tomás Rincón (c)
LM	7	Darwin Machís		(substituted off) 76'
CF	23	Salomón Rondón		(substituted off) 85'
Substitutions:
MF	18	Yeferson Soteldo		(substituted on) 66'
MF	19	Arquímedes Figuera	(yellow card) 90+1'	(substituted on) 76'
FW	17	Josef Martínez		(substituted on) 85'
Manager:
Rafael Dudamel

Man of the Match:
Philippe Coutinho (Brazil)

Assistant referees:
Christian Schiemann (Chile)
Claudio Ríos (Chile)
Fourth official:
Andrés Rojas (Colombia)
Video assistant referee:
Roberto Tobar (Chile)
Assistant video assistant referees:
Fernando Rapallini (Argentina)
Alexander Guzmán (Colombia)

=== Peru vs Brazil ===
22 June 2019
16:00

Peru	0–5	Brazil
	Report	Casemiro 12'; Firmino 19'; Everton 32'; Dani Alves 53'; Willian 90'

Arena Corinthians, São Paulo
Attendance: 42,317
Referee: Fernando Rapallini (Argentina)

Peru	Brazil

GK	1	Pedro Gallese
RB	17	Luis Advíncula	(yellow card) 80'
CB	5	Miguel Araujo
CB	2	Luis Abram
LB	6	Miguel Trauco
DM	13	Renato Tapia
RM	14	Andy Polo
CM	19	Yoshimar Yotún	(yellow card) 15'	(substituted off) 46'
CM	10	Jefferson Farfán
LM	8	Christian Cueva		(substituted off) 66'
CF	9	Paolo Guerrero (c)		(substituted off) 54'
Substitutions:
MF	20	Edison Flores		(substituted on) 46'
MF	23	Christofer Gonzáles		(substituted on) 54'
MF	7	Josepmir Ballón		(substituted on) 66'
Manager:
(Argentina) Ricardo Gareca

GK	1	Alisson
RB	13	Dani Alves (c)
CB	4	Marquinhos
CB	2	Thiago Silva	(yellow card) 77'
LB	6	Filipe Luís		(substituted off) 56'
CM	5	Casemiro	(yellow card) 9'	(substituted off) 69'
CM	8	Arthur
RW	11	Philippe Coutinho		(substituted off) 76'
AM	9	Gabriel Jesus
LW	19	Everton
CF	20	Roberto Firmino
Substitutions:
DF	12	Alex Sandro		(substituted on) 56'
MF	15	Allan		(substituted on) 69'
MF	10	Willian		(substituted on) 76'
Manager:
Tite

Man of the Match:
Everton (Brazil)

Assistant referees:
Hernán Maidana (Argentina)
Eduardo Cardozo (Paraguay)
Fourth official:
Arnaldo Samaniego (Paraguay)
Video assistant referee:
Andrés Rojas (Colombia)
Assistant video assistant referees:
Nicolás Gallo (Colombia)
Wilmar Navarro (Colombia)

=== Bolivia vs Venezuela ===
22 June 2019
16:00

Bolivia	1–3	Venezuela
Justiniano 82'	Report	Machís 2', 55'; Martínez 86'

Estádio Mineirão, Belo Horizonte
Attendance: 8,091
Referee: Esteban Ostojich (Uruguay)

Bolivia	Venezuela

GK	1	Carlos Lampe
RB	8	Diego Bejarano
CB	4	Luis Haquin
CB	22	Adrián Jusino
LB	17	Marvin Bejarano (c)		(substituted off) 71'
CM	7	Leonel Justiniano	(yellow card) 5'
CM	15	Paul Arano
RW	20	Fernando Saucedo
AM	11	Leonardo Vaca		(substituted off) 34'
LW	19	Ramiro Vaca
CF	9	Marcelo Moreno		(substituted off) 77'
Substitutions:
MF	14	Raúl Castro	(yellow card) 62'	(substituted on) 34'
MF	21	Roberto Fernández		(substituted on) 71'
FW	18	Gilbert Álvarez		(substituted on) 77'
Manager:
Eduardo Villegas

GK	1	Wuilker Faríñez
RB	20	Ronald Hernández
CB	4	Jhon Chancellor
CB	14	Luis Mago
LB	16	Roberto Rosales
DM	5	Júnior Moreno
RM	10	Jefferson Savarino
CM	11	Juanpi	(substituted off) 58'
CM	8	Tomás Rincón (c)
LM	7	Darwin Machís	(substituted off) 71'
CF	23	Salomón Rondón	(substituted off) 85'
Substitutions:
MF	18	Yeferson Soteldo	(substituted on) 58'
FW	17	Josef Martínez	(substituted on) 71'
MF	15	Jhon Murillo	(substituted on) 85'
Manager:
Rafael Dudamel

Man of the Match:
Darwin Machís (Venezuela)

Assistant referees:
Nicolás Taran (Uruguay)
Richard Trinidad (Uruguay)
Fourth official:
Carlos Orbe (Ecuador)
Video assistant referee:
Néstor Pitana (Argentina)
Assistant video assistant referees:
Piero Maza (Chile)
Alexander Guzmán (Colombia)

== Discipline ==
Fair play points would have been used as tiebreakers if the overall and head-to-head records of teams were tied. These were calculated based on yellow and red cards received in all group matches as follows:

- first yellow card: minus 1 point;
- indirect red card (second yellow card): minus 3 points;
- direct red card: minus 4 points;
- yellow card and direct red card: minus 5 points;

Only one of the above deductions were applied to a player in a single match.

Team	Match 1				Match 2				Match 3				Points
Team	Booked	(yellow card) (yellow-red card)	Sent off (straight red)	(yellow card) (red card)	Booked	(yellow card) (yellow-red card)	Sent off (straight red)	(yellow card) (red card)	Booked	(yellow card) (yellow-red card)	Sent off (straight red)	(yellow card) (red card)	Points
Brazil	1				1				2				−4
Bolivia	1				3				2				−6
Peru	2				2				2				−6
Venezuela	1	1			2								−6
