= 2019 Copa América final =

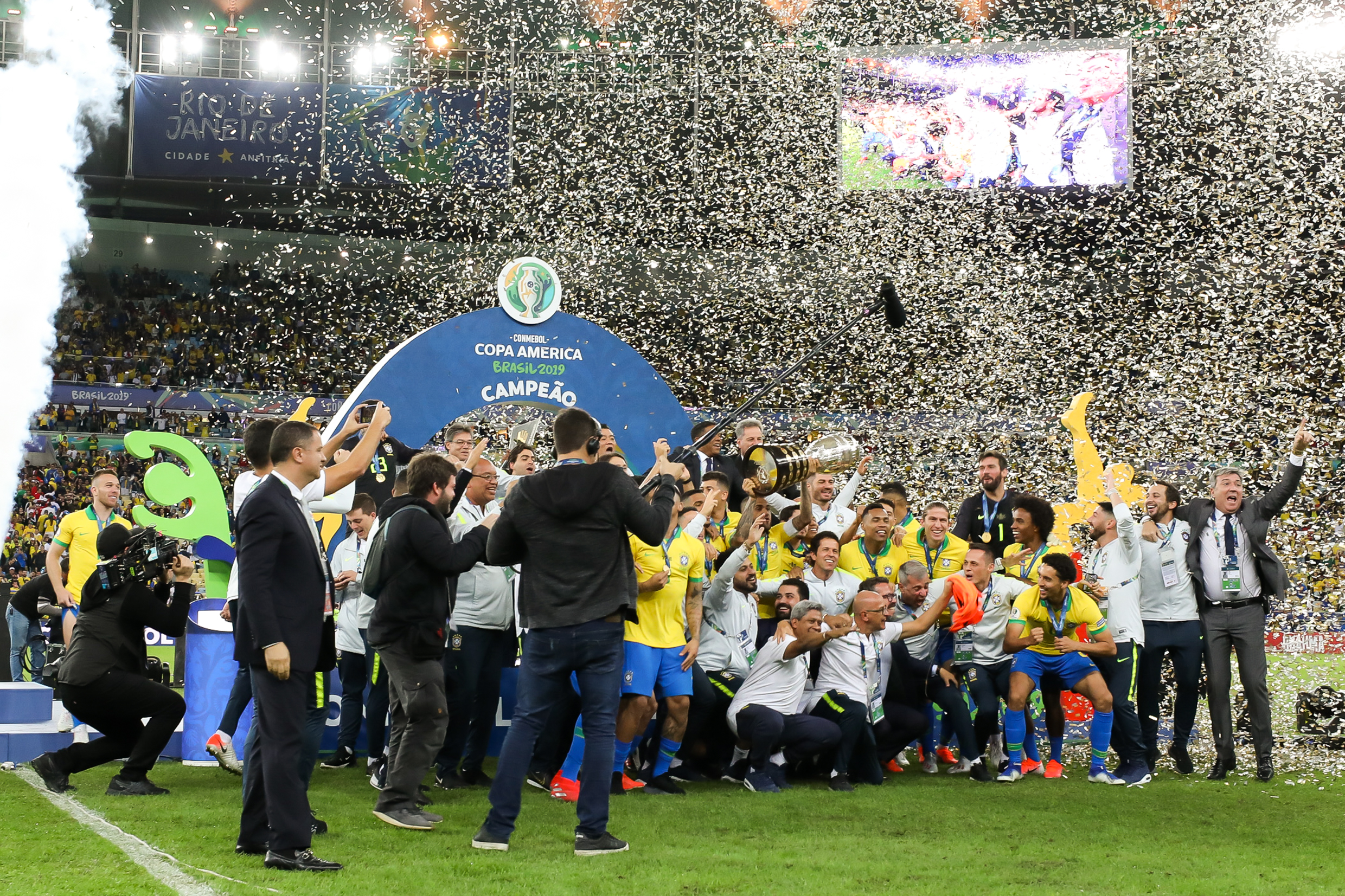
- Brazil celebrates their victory
- Event: 2019 Copa América
Brazil	Peru
3	1
- Date: 7 July 2019
- Venue: Estádio do Maracanã, Rio de Janeiro
- Man of the Match: Everton (Brazil)
- Referee: Roberto Tobar (Chile)
- Attendance: 69,968
- Weather: Rain

The 2019 Copa América final was a final match of the 46th edition of Copa América tournament that took place on 7 July 2019 at the Estádio do Maracanã in Rio de Janeiro, Brazil to determine the winner of the 2019 Copa América.

The match featured Brazil, the tournament hosts and Peru, in which Brazil won the match 3–1 to clinch their ninth Copa América title and their first since 2007.

== Background ==
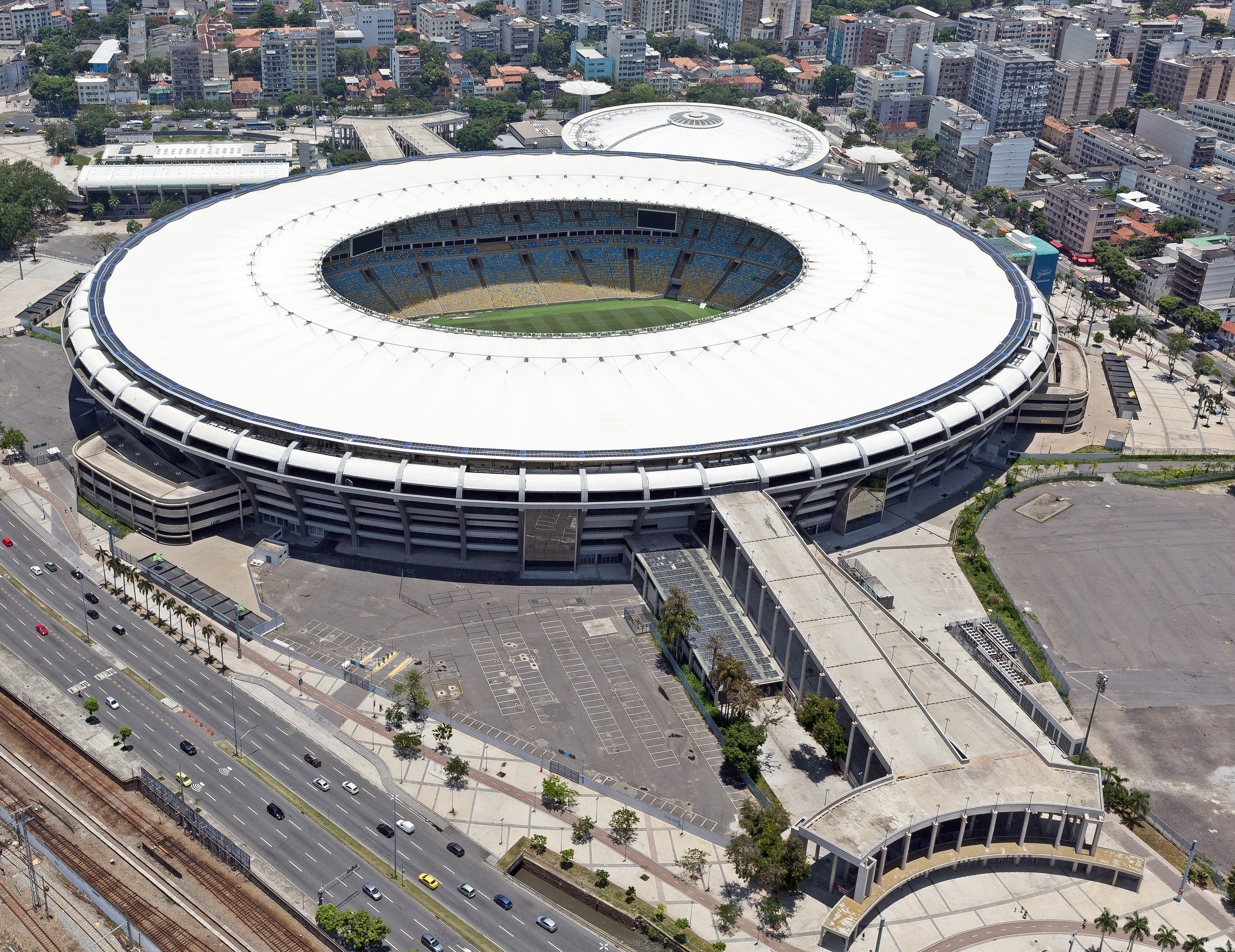
The Estádio do Maracanã in Rio de Janeiro hosted the final.

This edition was the fifth Copa América tournament hosted by Brazil. This final was the third for Peru in which they had been emerged as champions two times in their history. Their last championship (including worldwide tournaments) was won in 1975. Meanwhile, it was Brazil's nineteenth final in Copa América in which they had emerged as champions eight times. For the last time Brazil was crowned champions were in the 2007 Copa América which was hosted in Venezuela, after defeating Argentina by 3 goals to 0.

These two sides had met each other before the final in their respective group stage match where Brazil defeated Perú by a big margin of 5-0.

== Route to the final ==
Brazil
Round
Peru
Opponents
Result
Group stage
Opponents
Result
Bolivia
3–0
Match 1
Venezuela
0–0
Venezuela
0–0
Match 2
Bolivia
3–1
Peru
5–0
Match 3
Brazil
0–5
Group A winner

Pos	Team	Pld	Pts
1	Brazil (H)	3	7
2	Venezuela	3	5
3	Peru	3	4
4	Bolivia	3	0

Source: CONMEBOL
(H) Hosts
Final standings
Group A third place

Pos	Team	Pld	Pts
1	Brazil (H)	3	7
2	Venezuela	3	5
3	Peru	3	4
4	Bolivia	3	0

Source: CONMEBOL
(H) Hosts
Opponents
Result
Knockout stage
Opponents
Result
Paraguay
0–0 (4–3 p)
Quarter-finals
Uruguay
0–0 (5–4 p)
Argentina
2–0
Semi-finals
Chile
3–0

== Match ==
=== Summary ===
Everton opened the score sheet for Brazil after 15 minutes from the kick-off with a low right footed volley from eight yards out after a Gabriel Jesus cross from the right. Peru were awarded a penalty after 44 minutes when the ball struck the hand of Thiago Silva, with Paolo Guerrero scoring with a low shot to the right corner of the net. Guerrero's penalty was the first goal that Brazil had conceded at the tournament. Brazil went back in front a minute later with a shot to the left corner of the net from inside the penalty area from Gabriel Jesus. Gabriel Jesus was shown a red card after 70 minutes after picking up a second yellow for jumping into the back of Carlos Zambrano. Substitute Richarlison made it 3–1 in the 90th minute with a penalty, shooting low to the left corner after Everton was fouled by Zambrano.

=== Details ===
7 July 2019
17:00

Brazil	3–1	Peru
Everton 15'; Gabriel Jesus 45+3'; Richarlison 90' (pen.)	Report	Guerrero 44' (pen.)

Estádio do Maracanã, Rio de Janeiro
Attendance: 69,968
Referee: Roberto Tobar (Chile)

Brazil	Peru

GK	1	Alisson
RB	13	Dani Alves (c)
CB	4	Marquinhos
CB	2	Thiago Silva	(yellow card) 53'
LB	12	Alex Sandro
CM	8	Arthur
CM	5	Casemiro
RW	9	Gabriel Jesus	(yellow card) 30' (yellow-red card) 70'
AM	11	Philippe Coutinho		(substituted off) 77'
LW	19	Everton		(substituted off) 90+3'
CF	20	Roberto Firmino		(substituted off) 75'
Substitutions:
FW	21	Richarlison	(yellow card) 90+1'	(substituted on) 75'
DF	14	Éder Militão		(substituted on) 77'
MF	15	Allan		(substituted on) 90+3'
Manager:
Tite

GK	1	Pedro Gallese
RB	17	Luis Advíncula	(yellow card) 84'
CB	15	Carlos Zambrano	(yellow card) 68'
CB	2	Luis Abram
LB	6	Miguel Trauco
CM	13	Renato Tapia	(yellow card) 49'	(substituted off) 82'
CM	19	Yoshimar Yotún		(substituted off) 78'
RW	20	Edison Flores
AM	8	Christian Cueva
LW	18	André Carrillo		(substituted off) 86'
CF	9	Paolo Guerrero (c)
Substitutions:
FW	11	Raúl Ruidíaz		(substituted on) 78'
MF	23	Christofer Gonzáles		(substituted on) 82'
FW	14	Andy Polo		(substituted on) 86'
Manager:
(Argentina) Ricardo Gareca

Man of the Match:
Everton (Brazil)

Assistant referees:
Christian Schiemann (Chile)
Claudio Ríos (Chile)
Fourth official:
Alexis Herrera (Venezuela)
Video assistant referee:
Julio Bascuñán (Chile)
Assistant video assistant referees:
Nicolás Gallo (Colombia)
Alexander Guzmán (Colombia)

Match rules

- 90 minutes.
- 30 minutes of extra time if necessary.
- Penalty shoot-out if scores still level.
- Maximum of twelve named substitutes.
- Maximum of three substitutions, with a fourth allowed in extra time.

=== Statistics ===
Overall
	Brazil	Peru
Goals scored	3	1
Total shots	12	7
Shots on target	3	2
Ball possession	54%	46%
Fouls committed	25	21
Yellow cards	2	3
Red cards	1	0
Offsides	0	0
Corner kicks	3	4
Saves	1	0
