= Leonel Justiniano =

Bolivian footballer (born 1992)

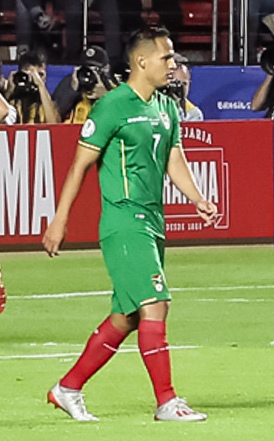
- Justiniano with Bolivia at the 2019 Copa América

Personal information
- Full name: Leonel Justiniano Arauz
- Date of birth: 2 July 1992 (age 34)
- Place of birth: Santa Cruz de la Sierra, Bolivia
- Height: 1.72 m (5 ft 7 1/2 in)
- Position: Central midfielder

Team information
- Current team: Bolívar
- Number: 23

Youth career
- Bolívar

Senior career*
Years	Team	Apps	(Gls)
2011–2019	Bolívar	192	(16)
2014–2015	→ Nacional Potosí (loan)	42	(9)
2019–2020	Wilstermann	36	(0)
2021–	Bolívar	140	(13)

International career^{‡}
2017–	Bolivia	52	(2)
- * Club domestic league appearances and goals as of 30 December 2025 ‡ National team caps and goals as of 23:27, 1 July 2024 (UTC)

Leonel Justiniano Arauz (born 2 July 1992), is a Bolivian professional footballer who plays as a central midfielder for División Profesional club Bolívar, which he captains, and the Bolivia national team.

== International statistics ==
As of match played 1 July 2024

Appearances and goals by national team and year
National team	Year	Apps	Goals
Bolivia	2017	7	0
Bolivia	2018	8	0
Bolivia	2019	9	1
Bolivia	2020	2	0
Bolivia	2021	15	0
Bolivia	2022	4	1
Bolivia	2023	3	0
Bolivia	2024	5	0
Total		53	2

Scores and results list Bolivia's goal tally first.

No.	Date	Venue	Opponent	Score	Result	Competition
1.	22 June 2019	Estádio Mineirão, Belo Horizonte, Brazil	Venezuela	1–2	1–3	2019 Copa América
2.	21 January 2022	Estadio Olímpico Patria, Sucre, Bolivia	Trinidad and Tobago	4–0	5–0	Friendly
