= Everton Soares =

Brazilian footballer (born 1996)

Everton
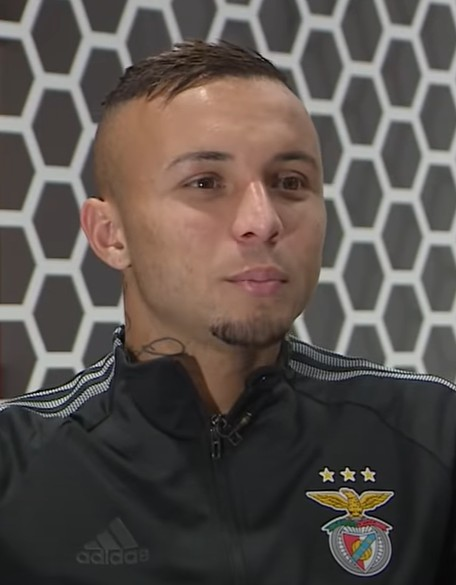
- Everton with Benfica in 2020

Personal information
- Full name: Everton Sousa Soares
- Date of birth: 22 March 1996 (age 30)
- Place of birth: Maracanaú, Ceará, Brazil
- Height: 1.74 m (5 ft 9 in)
- Positions: Winger; forward

Team information
- Current team: Santos
- Number: 7

Youth career
- 2009–2012: Fortaleza
- 2012: → Grêmio (loan)
- 2013: Grêmio

Senior career*
| Years | Team | Apps | (Gls) |
| 2014–2020 | Grêmio | 208 | (51) |
| 2020–2022 | Benfica | 59 | (10) |
| 2022–2026 | Flamengo | 133 | (16) |
| 2026– | Santos | 8 | (0) |

International career
| 2018–2021 | Brazil | 25 | (3) |
Medal record
Men's football
Representing Brazil
Copa América
| Winner | 2019 Brazil |
| Runner-up | 2021 Brazil |
- * Club domestic league appearances and goals as of 17:23, 19 November 2026 (UTC)

Everton Sousa Soares (born 22 March 1996), usually known as just Everton (Brazilian Portuguese: [ˈɛvɛʁtõ]) or Everton Cebolinha ("Jimmy Five" in Portuguese), is a Brazilian professional footballer who plays as a forward for Campeonato Brasileiro Série A club Santos.

== Club career ==
=== Early career ===
Everton was born in Maracanaú, Ceará, and joined Grêmio's youth setup in 2012, from Fortaleza. Initially on loan, he signed a permanent contract in October 2013, whilst also being linked to Manchester City in the process. In that period, he also received the nickname of Cebolinha by teammate

=== Grêmio ===
Promoted to the main squad by head coach Enderson Moreira ahead of the 2014 season, Everton made his first team debut on 19 January of that year, coming on as a second-half substitute for Yuri Mamute in a 1–0 Campeonato Gaúcho away loss against São José-PA. His first goal came on four days later, as he scored the first goal in a 2–1 home win against Lajeadense.

Everton made his Série A debut on 20 April 2014, replacing Pará in a 1–0 away loss against Athletico Paranaense. Rarely used during the tournament, he started to feature more regularly during the 2015 campaign, scoring his first goal in the top tier on 6 September in a 2–1 home success over Goiás.

On 15 August 2016, Everton renewed his contract with Grêmio until 2020. On 23 November, in the first leg of the 2016 Copa do Brasil Finals, he came on as a late substitute for Douglas and scored the 3rd goal in a 3–1 away win against Atlético Mineiro; he was a starter in the second leg, a 1–1 home draw which granted the title to Grêmio.

Everton played his 100th match for Grêmio on 9 March 2017, after coming on for Pedro Rocha in a 2–0 Copa Libertadores away win against Zamora FC.

=== Benfica ===
Everton with Benfica in 2021

On 14 August 2020, Everton signed for Portuguese side Benfica on a five-year deal. He made his debut abroad on 15 September, but in a 2–1 away loss to PAOK in the UEFA Champions League, and scored his first goal three days later, in a 5–1 Primeira Liga away routing of Famalicão.

Initially a regular starter, Everton became a backup option from January 2021 onwards. On 7 November of that year, he scored a brace and provided two assists in a 6–1 home thrashing of Braga.

=== Flamengo ===
On 15 June 2022, Everton returned to Brazil and signed for Flamengo. He made his club debut on 20 July, replacing Pedro at half-time and providing the assist for Lázaro's fourth goal in a 4–0 home routing of Juventude. In that year, he also helped the club to win the 2022 Copa Libertadores by featuring in five matches of the competition.

Regularly used, Everton suffered an Achilles tendon injury in August 2024 which sidelined him for the remainder of the year. Upon returning, he was mainly a backup option to Gonzalo Plata and Samuel Lino.

=== Santos ===
On 9 September 2026, Everton was announced at Santos on a contract until the end of the year, after terminating his link with Flamengo. He made his club debut four days later, starting in a 2–0 home win over Cruzeiro.

== International career ==
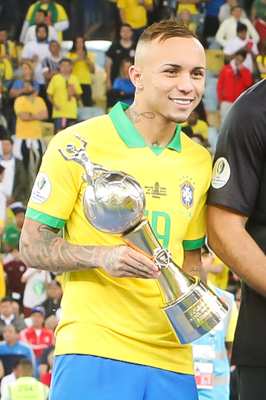
Everton receiving the 2019 Copa América top scorer award with Brazil

On 17 August 2018, Everton was called up by coach Tite for friendly matches against United States, and El Salvador. Thus, Everton was in the first list of Brazil after the 2018 FIFA World Cup.

In May 2019, he was included in Brazil's 23-man squad for the 2019 Copa América on home soil. He scored his first ever international goal in Brazil's opening game of the tournament, netting the final goal in a 3–0 win against Bolivia on 15 June. Seven days later, Everton scored his second international goal against Peru, in Brazil's final group stage match, firing in a shot at the near post from outside the box; the match ended in a 5–0 victory to Brazil, which enabled the hosts to advance to the quarter-finals of the tournament.

In the 2019 Copa América Final on 7 July, at the Maracanã Stadium, Everton scored the opening goal in an eventual 3–1 win over Peru, and was named Man of the Match; he also finished the tournament as the top scorer with 3 goals, alongside Peru's Paolo Guerrero, but won the Golden Boot Award due to having played fewer minutes than the Peruvian throughout the tournament.

In June 2021, he was included in Brazil's squad for the 2021 Copa América on home soil.

Everton Soares was not called up to play at the 2022 World Cup in Qatar, however, he still hopes to be selected for Brazil's 2026 World Cup squad based on his performances for Flamengo.

== Personal life ==
=== Nickname ===
Everton got the nickname Cebola (Onion in Portuguese) from his Grêmio teammate Pará, however, with the arrival of Uruguayan new transfer Cristian Rodríguez, who's also known as Cebolla, Everton came to be called Cebolinha in reference to the cartoon character Jimmy Five (Cebolinha in Brazil), of Monica's Gang.

== Career statistics ==
=== Club ===
As of 19 November 2026

Appearances and goals by club, season and competition
| Club | Season | League | | | State league (Note: Includes Campeonato Gaúcho, Campeonato Carioca) | | National cup (Note: Includes Copa do Brasil, Taça de Portugal) | | League cup (Note: Includes Taça da Liga) | | Continental | | Other | | Total | |
| Club | Season | Division | Apps | Goals | Apps | Goals | Apps | Goals | Apps | Goals | Apps | Goals | Apps | Goals | Apps | Goals |
|---|---|---|---|---|---|---|---|---|---|---|---|---|---|---|---|---|
| Grêmio | 2014 | Série A | 7 | 0 | 7 | 2 | 0 | 0 | — | | 0 | 0 | — | | 14 | 2 |
| Grêmio | 2015 | Série A | 14 | 4 | 12 | 1 | 2 | 0 | — | | 0 | 0 | — | | 28 | 5 |
| Grêmio | 2016 | Série A | 27 | 3 | 9 | 2 | 6 | 2 | — | | 5 (Note: Appearances in Copa Libertadores) | 1 | 2 (Note: Appearances in Primeira Liga) | 0 | 49 | 8 |
| Grêmio | 2017 | Série A | 32 | 8 | 10 | 0 | 5 | 2 | — | | 12 | 1 | 2 (Note: Appearances in FIFA Club World Cup) | 1 | 61 | 12 |
| Grêmio | 2018 | Série A | 27 | 10 | 11 | 3 | 3 | 1 | — | | 8 | 5 | 2 (Note: Appearances in Recopa Sudamericana) | 0 | 51 | 19 |
| Grêmio | 2019 | Série A | 30 | 11 | 10 | 4 | 5 | 1 | — | | 12 | 4 | — | | 57 | 20 |
| Grêmio | 2020 | Série A | 0 | 0 | 12 | 3 | 0 | 0 | — | | 2 | 0 | — | | 14 | 3 |
| Grêmio | Total | | 137 | 36 | 71 | 15 | 21 | 6 | — | | 39 | 11 | 6 | 1 | 274 | 69 |
| Benfica | 2020–21 | Primeira Liga | 32 | 7 | — | | 4 | 0 | 2 | 0 | 9 (Note: One appearance in UEFA Champions League, eight appearances and one goal in UEFA Europa League) | 1 | 1 (Note: Appearance in Supertaça Cândido de Oliveira) | 0 | 48 | 8 |
| Benfica | 2021–22 | Primeira Liga | 27 | 3 | — | | 3 | 2 | 4 | 2 | 13 (Note: Appearances in UEFA Champions League) | 0 | — | | 47 | 7 |
| Benfica | Total | | 59 | 10 | — | | 7 | 2 | 6 | 2 | 22 | 1 | 1 | 0 | 95 | 15 |
| Flamengo | 2022 | Série A | 20 | 2 | 0 | 0 | 6 | 1 | — | | 5 | 0 | — | | 31 | 3 |
| Flamengo | 2023 | Série A | 33 | 4 | 13 | 1 | 6 | 1 | — | | 7 | 0 | 5 (Note: One appearance in Supercopa do Brasil, two appearances in FIFA Club World Cup, two appearances in Recopa Sudamericana) | 0 | 64 | 6 |
| Flamengo | 2024 | Série A | 10 | 1 | 12 | 3 | 3 | 0 | — | | 5 | 1 | — | | 30 | 5 |
| Flamengo | 2025 | Série A | 23 | 1 | 6 | 1 | 3 | 2 | — | | 6 | 0 | 5 (Note: Two appearances in FIFA Club World Cup, three appearances in FIFA Intercontinental Cup) | 0 | 43 | 4 |
| Flamengo | 2026 | Série A | 12 | 1 | 7 | 2 | 2 | 0 | — | | 1 | 0 | 3 (Note: One appearance in Supercopa do Brasil, two appearances in Recopa Sudamericana) | 0 | 25 | 3 |
| Flamengo | Total | | 98 | 9 | 38 | 7 | 20 | 4 | — | | 24 | 1 | 13 | 0 | 193 | 21 |
| Santos | 2026 | Série A | 8 | 0 | — | | — | | — | | — | | — | | 8 | 0 |
| Career total | | | 302 | 55 | 109 | 22 | 48 | 12 | 6 | 2 | 85 | 13 | 20 | 1 | 570 | 105 |

=== International ===
As of match played 10 July 2021

Appearances and goals by national team and year
| National team | Year | Apps | Goals |
|---|---|---|---|
| Brazil | 2018 | 2 | 0 |
| Brazil | 2019 | 12 | 3 |
| Brazil | 2020 | 4 | 0 |
| Brazil | 2021 | 7 | 0 |
| Total | | 25 | 3 |

Scores and results list Brazil's goal tally first, score column indicates score after each Everton goal.

International goals by date, venue, cap, opponent, score, result and competition
| No. | Date | Venue | Cap | Opponent | Score | Result | Competition |
|---|---|---|---|---|---|---|---|
| 1. | 14 June 2019 | Estádio do Morumbi, São Paulo, Brazil | 7 | Bolivia | 3–0 | 3–0 | 2019 Copa América |
| 2. | 22 June 2019 | Arena Corinthians, São Paulo, Brazil | 9 | Peru | 3–0 | 5–0 | 2019 Copa América |
| 3. | 7 July 2019 | Estádio do Maracanã, Rio de Janeiro, Brazil | 12 | Peru | 1–0 | 3–1 | 2019 Copa América final |

== Honours ==
Grêmio

- Copa do Brasil: 2016
- Copa Libertadores: 2017
- Recopa Sudamericana: 2018
- Campeonato Gaúcho: 2018, 2019, 2020

Flamengo

- Campeonato Brasileiro Série A: 2025
- Copa do Brasil: 2022, 2024
- Copa Libertadores: 2022, 2025
- Supercopa do Brasil: 2025
- FIFA Challenger Cup: 2025
- FIFA Derby of the Americas: 2025
- Campeonato Carioca: 2024, 2025, 2026

Brazil

- Copa América: 2019

Individual

- Bola de Prata: 2018
- Copa América Golden Boot: 2019
- Copa América Team of the Tournament: 2019
