= Mario Cuéllar =

Bolivian footballer (born 1989)

Personal information
- Full name: Mario Alberto Cuéllar Saavedra
- Date of birth: 5 May 1989 (age 37)
- Place of birth: Santa Cruz de la Sierra, Bolivia
- Height: 1.80 m (5 ft 11 in)
- Position: Defender

Team information
- Current team: GV San José

Senior career*
Years	Team	Apps	(Gls)
2011–2016	Sport Boys Warnes	59	(2)
2014	→ Petrolero (loan)		
2016–2017	Blooming	30	(1)
2017	Sport Boys Warnes	10	(1)
2018	San José	38	(4)
2019–2020	Oriente Petrolero	32	(2)
2021	Nacional Potosi	10	(0)
2022	Real Santa Cruz	29	(0)
2023	Wilstermann	10	(0)
2024	GV San José	8	(0)

International career^{‡}
2017–	Bolivia	2	(0)
- * Club domestic league appearances and goals as of 08:26, 29 May 2024 (UTC) ‡ National team caps and goals as of 31 March 2019

Mario Alberto Cuéllar Saavedra (born 5 May 1989) is a Bolivian professional footballer who last played for GV San José as a central defender.

== Club career ==
Cuellar played for Sport Boys Warnes when they won the Apertura 2015–16 Liga de Fútbol Profesional Boliviano season. He then joined Club Blooming before re-signing with Sport Boys Warnes in July 2017. In December 2018 Cuellar joined Nacional Potosi from Club San José with whom he had won the 2018 Bolivian Primera División season Clausura.

Cuellar joined Club Jorge Wilstermann ahead of the 2023 season from Real Santa Cruz.

== International career ==
On 23 March 2017, Cuéllar started a 2018 FIFA World Cup qualification game for the Bolivia national football team away against the Colombia national football team.

== Honours ==
Sport Boys Warnes

- First Division – LPFB Era:2015-A

Club San José

- Bolivian Primera División: 2018-C
