= Diego Wayar =

Bolivian footballer (born 1993)

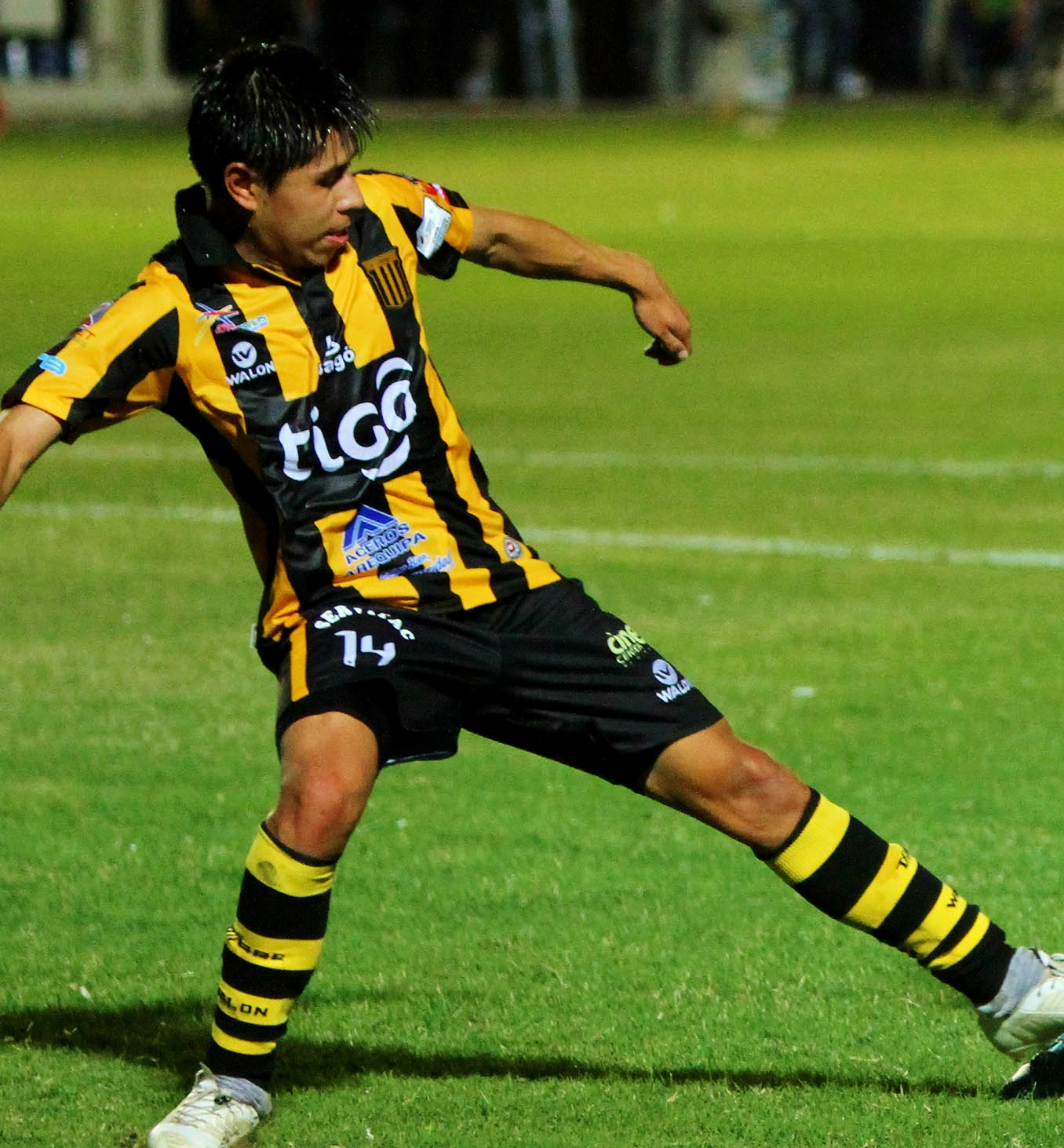
- Wayar with The Strongest in 2015

Personal information
- Full name: Diego Horacio Wayar Cruz
- Date of birth: 15 October 1993 (age 33)
- Place of birth: Tarija, Bolivia
- Height: 1.69 m (5 ft 6 1/2 in)
- Positions: Midfielder; right back

Team information
- Current team: Real Tomayapo
- Number: 14

Youth career
- –2008: Unión Tarija

Senior career*
| Years | Team | Apps | (Gls) |
| 2009 | Unión Tarija | | |
| 2010–2011 | Ciclón | | |
| 2011 | García Agreda | | |
| 2012–2024 | The Strongest | 321 | (9) |
| 2025– | Real Tomayapo | 5 | (0) |

International career^{‡}
| 2016–2021 | Bolivia | 24 | (0) |
- * Club domestic league appearances and goals as of 30 December 2025 ‡ National team caps and goals as of 29 June 2021

Diego Horacio Wayar Cruz (born 15 October 1993) is a Bolivian footballer who plays for Real Tomayapo as either a defensive midfielder or a right back.

== Club career ==
Born in Tarija, Wayar was initially a forward during his beginnings. He played for hometown clubs Unión Tarija and Ciclón before joining García Agreda in 2011.

In January 2012 Wayar joined LFPB side The Strongest, and had his main position changed to a midfielder by manager Mauricio Soria. He made his debut for the club on 29 January, starting in a 1–0 away loss against Nacional Potosí.

Wayar scored his first professional goal on 15 April 2012, in a 3–1 away win against La Paz FC.

== International career ==
On 23 August 2016, Wayar was called up by Bolivia national team manager Ángel Hoyos for two 2018 FIFA World Cup qualification matches against Peru and Chile. He made his full international debut on 1 September, coming on as a first half substitute for Jhasmani Campos in a 2–0 home win against the former.
