= Leonardo Vaca =

Bolivian footballer (born 1995)

Personal information
- Full name: Leonardo Vaca Gutiérrez
- Date of birth: November 24, 1995 (age 30)
- Place of birth: Santa Cruz de la Sierra, Bolivia
- Height: 1.74 m (5 ft 8 1/2 in)
- Position: Striker

Youth career
- 2009–2013: Tahuichi Academy

Senior career*
| Years | Team | Apps | (Gls) |
| 2014–2019 | Blooming | 121 | (20) |
| 2016–2017 | → Sport Boys (loan) | 23 | (2) |
| 2019–2021 | Bolívar | 49 | (7) |
| 2022–2023 | Aurora | 32 | (2) |
| 2023–2024 | Žalgiris | 17 | (3) |
| 2024 | Turan | 20 | (3) |

International career
| 2015 | Bolivia U-20 | 4 | (0) |
| 2018–2019 | Bolivia | 18 | (1) |
- * Club domestic league appearances and goals as of 16 November 2024

Leonardo Vaca Gutiérrez (born November 24, 1995) is a Bolivian professional footballer who plays as a striker for Kazakhstani club Turan.

== International career ==
Vaca was summoned to the Bolivian U-20 team to play in the 2015 South American Youth Football Championship.

He was named in Bolivia's senior squad for a 2018 FIFA World Cup qualifier against Colombia in March 2016.

=== International goals ===
Scores and results list Bolivia's goal tally first.

| No. | Date | Venue | Opponent | Score | Result | Competition |
|---|---|---|---|---|---|---|
| 1. | 13 October 2018 | Thuwunna Stadium, Yangon, Myanmar | Myanmar | 3–0 | 3–0 | Friendly |
