= Raúl Castro (footballer) =

Bolivian footballer (born 1989)

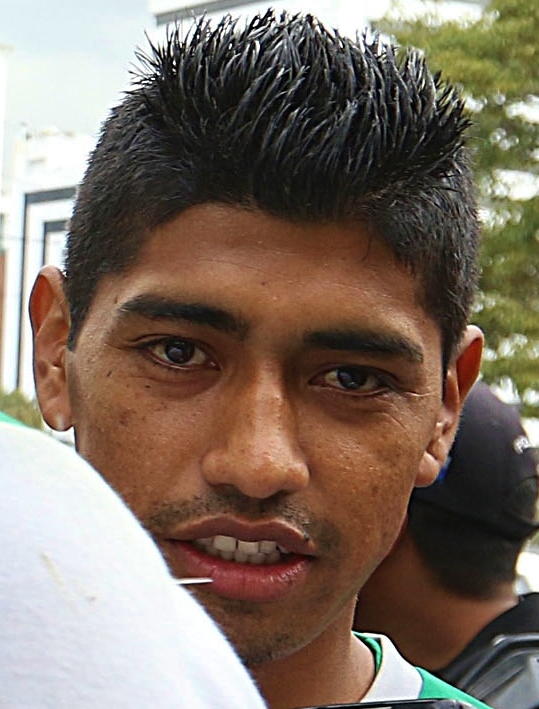
- Castro in 2015

Personal information
- Full name: Raúl Castro Peñaloza
- Date of birth: 19 August 1989 (age 37)
- Place of birth: La Paz, Bolivia
- Height: 1.81 m (5 ft 11 in)
- Position: Defensive midfielder

Team information
- Current team: The Strongest
- Number: 10

Youth career
- 2005–: Mariscal Braun

Senior career*
Years	Team	Apps	(Gls)
–2012	Universitario de Sucre		
2012–2013	Unión Maestranza		
2013–2021	The Strongest	301	(11)
2022	Wilstermann	35	(0)
2023–2025	Universitario (V)	93	(4)
2026–	The Strongest	16	(0)

International career^{‡}
2014–	Bolivia	24	(0)
- * Club domestic league appearances and goals as of 30 December 2025 ‡ National team caps and goals as of 01:38, 3 January 2021 (UTC)

Raúl Castro Peñaloza (born 19 August 1989), nicknamed as "Chacha" and "El Comandante", is a Bolivian footballer who plays as a defensive midfielder for Liga de Fútbol Profesional Boliviano club The Strongest.
