= Adrián Jusino =

Bolivian footballer (born 1992)

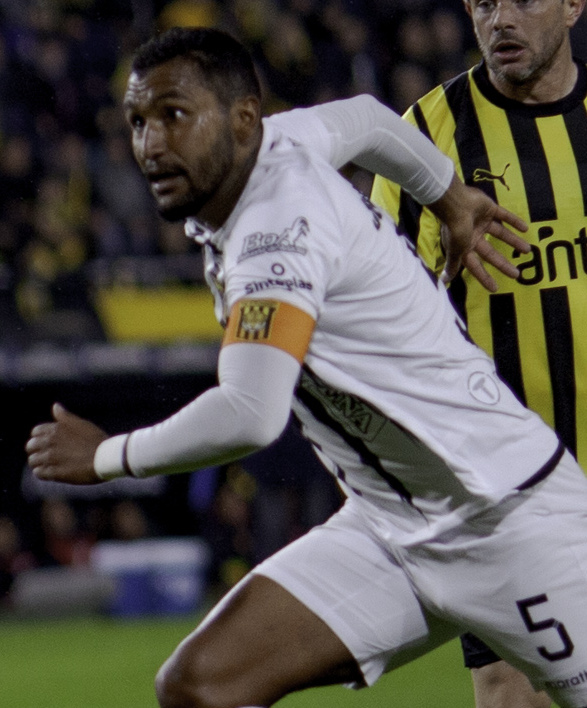
- Jusino with The Strongest in 2024

Personal information
- Full name: Adrián Johnny Jusino Cerruto
- Birth name: Adrián Jusino Williams
- Date of birth: 9 July 1992 (age 34)
- Place of birth: Springfield, Massachusetts, U.S.
- Height: 1.85 m (6 ft 1 in)
- Position: Centre back

Team information
- Current team: The Strongest
- Number: 5

Youth career
- 2008–2012: Bolívar
- 2012–2013: Petrolero

College career
Years	Team	Apps	(Gls)
2013	Richland College Thunderducks	12	(0)

Senior career*
Years	Team	Apps	(Gls)
2013	Petrolero	0	(0)
2013–2015	Unión Maestranza	0	(0)
2016	Ventura County Fusion	10	(0)
2016–2017	Always Ready		
2018	Tulsa Roughnecks	23	(0)
2019–2020	Bolívar	52	(6)
2021	AEL	7	(0)
2021–	The Strongest	135	(5)

International career^{‡}
2019–	Bolivia	36	(0)
- * Club domestic league appearances and goals as of 26 July 2025 ‡ National team caps and goals as of 12 June 2024

Adrián Johnny Jusino Cerruto (born 9 July 1992) is a professional footballer who plays as a defender for Bolivian club The Strongest. Born in the United States, he plays for the Bolivia national team.

With Bolivia he has earned 34 caps and has played at 1 Copa America.

== Early life ==
Jusino was born in Springfield, Massachusetts, to an American father and Bolivian mother. At three months old, he arrived in Coroico, La Paz, with his mother, where he spent his childhood and youth. It was there that he dreamed of becoming a footballer player.

== Club career ==
Jusino played a year of college soccer at Richland College in 2013, before playing for Unión Maestranza and Always Ready in Bolivia, as well as a short spell with Premier Development League side Ventura County Fusion in 2016. He returned to the United States on 23 January 2018 when he signed with United Soccer League side Tulsa Roughnecks.

== International career ==
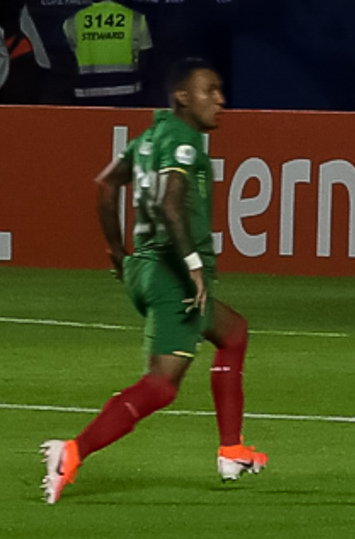
Jusino with Bolivia at the 2019 Copa América

Jusino made his debut for Bolivia national football team on 3 March 2019 in a friendly against Nicaragua.

== Career statistics ==
=== International ===
As of match played on 12 June 2024

Appearances and goals by national team and year
National team	Year	Apps	Goals
Bolivia	2019	10	0
Bolivia	2020	2	1
Bolivia	2021	11	0
Bolivia	2022	4	0
Bolivia	2023	6	0
Bolivia	2024	3	0
Total		36	0

== Honours ==
Bolívar

- FBF División Profesional: 2019

The Strongest

- FBF División Profesional: 2023
