= Luis Haquín =

Bolivian footballer (born 1997)

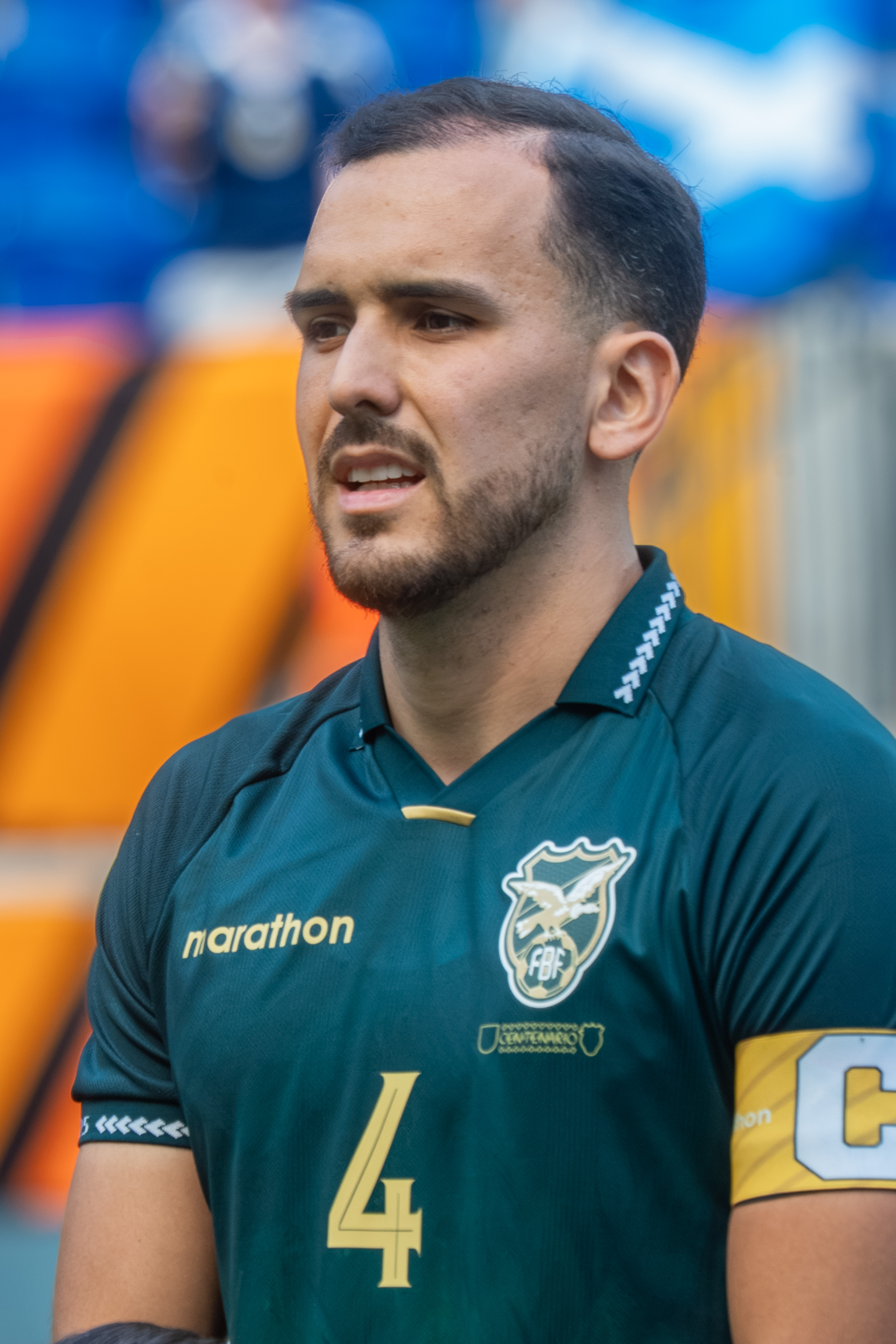
- Haquín with Bolivia in 2026

Personal information
- Full name: Luis Fernando Haquín López
- Date of birth: 15 November 1997 (age 28)
- Place of birth: Santa Cruz de la Sierra, Bolivia
- Height: 1.90 m (6 ft 3 in)
- Position: Centre-back

Senior career*
Years	Team	Apps	(Gls)
2015–2018	Oriente Petrolero	63	(3)
2019–2020	Puebla	7	(0)
2020	→ Bolívar (loan)	0	(0)
2021	→ Melipilla (loan)	14	(1)
2022	Carlos A. Mannucci	1	(0)
2022–2025	Bolívar	41	(1)
2023	Deportivo Cali (loan)	15	(0)
2024	→ Ponte Preta (loan)	13	(0)
2025	→ Mushuc Runa (loan)	12	(2)
2025–2026	Al-Tai	27	(2)
2026–	Khor Fakkan	4	(0)

International career^{‡}
2017	Bolivia U20	4	(0)
2017–	Bolivia	55	(1)
- * Club domestic league appearances and goals as of 18:33, 11 September 2026 (UTC) ‡ National team caps and goals as of 22:55, 30 September 2026 (UTC)

Luis Fernando Haquín López (born 15 November 1997) is a Bolivian professional footballer.

== Club career ==
=== Oriente Petrolero ===
Haquín played for Oriente Petrolero in the Bolivian Primera División.

He made his professional debut on 11 December 2016 in a 4–0 defeat against Universitario in Sucre, during matchday 20 of the 2016–17 Torneo Apertura season. He started the match and played the full 90 minutes.

He scored his first goal on 5 November 2017 in the Clásico Cruceño against Blooming, netting the opening goal to give Oriente a 1–0 lead.

=== Puebla ===
In December 2018, it was announced that he was transferred to Puebla in the Liga MX.

=== Carlos A. Mannucci ===
On 8 December 2021, he was announced as a new player for Carlos A. Mannucci for the 2022 season. Two months later, his return to Bolívar was confirmed, as his contract included a clause allowing him to leave the Peruvian club in case of a better offer.

== International career ==
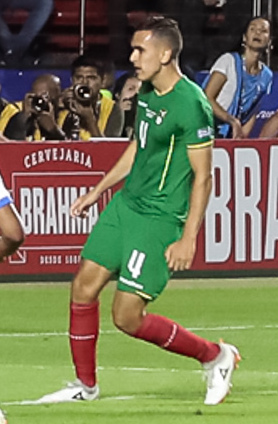
Haquín playing for Bolivia at the 2019 Copa América

He was included in the Bolivia national football team squad for the first time on 10 March 2017 for a World Cup qualifying double fixture against Colombia and Argentina, although he did not appear in either match.

He made his debut on 7 June 2017 in a friendly match against Nicaragua in Yacuiba, coming on in the 89th minute as a substitute for Jordy Candia.

He scored his first goal for the senior national team on 13 October 2018 in a friendly match against Myanmar.

== Career statistics ==
=== Club ===
As of 11 September 2026

Appearances and goals by club, season and competition
Club	Season	League			State league		National Cup		League Cup		Continental		Other		Total	
Club	Season	Division	Apps	Goals	Apps	Goals	Apps	Goals	Apps	Goals	Apps	Goals	Apps	Goals	Apps	Goals
Oriente Petrolero	2015-16	FBF División Profesional	0	0	—		—		—		—		—		0	0
Oriente Petrolero	2016-17	FBF División Profesional	31	1	—		—		—		2 (Note: Appearance(s) in Copa Sudamericana)	0	—		33	1
Oriente Petrolero	2018	FBF División Profesional	32	2	—		—		—		4 (Note: Appearance(s) in Copa Libertadores)	0	—		36	2
Oriente Petrolero	Total		63	3	—		—		—		6	0	—		69	3
Puebla	2018-19	Liga MX	7	0	—		4	0	—		—		—		11	0
Puebla	2019-20	Liga MX	0	0	—		0	0	—		—		—		0	0
Puebla	Total		7	0	—		4	0	—		—		—		11	0
Bolívar (loan)	2020	FBF División Profesional	—		—		—		—		3 (Note: Two appearances, One goal in Copa Sudamericana, One appearance in Copa Libertadores)	1	—		3	1
Melipilla (loan)	2021	Liga de Primera	15	1	—		—		—		—		—		15	1
Carlos A. Mannucci	2022	Peruvian Liga 1	1	0	—		—		—		—		—		1	0
Bolívar	2022	FBF División Profesional	32	1	—		—		—		—		—		32	1
Bolívar	2023	FBF División Profesional	7	0	—		—		—		0	0	0	0	7	0
Bolívar	Total		39	1	—		—		—		0	0	0	0	39	1
Deportivo Cali	2023	Liga DIMAYOR	15	0	—		1	0	—		—		—		16	0
Ponte Preta (loan)	2024	Série B	7	0	6 (Note: Appearance(s) in Campeonato Paulista Série A1)	0	—		—		—		—		13	0
Mushuc Runa (loan)	2025	Liga DIMAYOR	12	2	—		0	0	—		7	1	—		19	3
Al-Tai	2025–26	Saudi First Division League	27	2	—		1	0	—		—		—		28	2
Khor Fakkan	2026–27	UAE Pro League	4	0	—		0	0	0	0	—		—		4	0
Career Total			190	9	6	0	6	0	0	0	16	2	0	0	218	11

=== International ===
As of match played 30 September 2026

Appearances and goals by national team and year
National team	Year	Apps	Goals
Bolivia	2017	1	0
Bolivia	2018	9	1
Bolivia	2019	6	0
Bolivia	2021	8	0
Bolivia	2022	2	0
Bolivia	2023	5	0
Bolivia	2024	11	0
Bolivia	2025	7	0
Bolivia	2026	6	0
Total		55	1

Scores and results list Bolivia's goal tally first.

No	Date	Venue	Opponent	Score	Result	Competition
1.	13 October 2018	Thuwunna Stadium, Yangon, Myanmar	Myanmar	1–0	3–0	Friendly
2.	15 March 2026	Estadio Ramón Tahuichi Aguilera, Santa Cruz de la Sierra, Bolivia	Trinidad and Tobago	1–0	3–0	Friendly
