= Christofer Gonzáles =

Peruvian footballer (born 1992)

Personal information
- Full name: Christofer Gonzáles Crespo
- Date of birth: 12 October 1992 (age 34)
- Place of birth: Lima, Peru
- Height: 1.87 m (6 ft 2 in)
- Position: Midfielder

Youth career
- Universitario de Deportes

Senior career*
Years	Team	Apps	(Gls)
2012–2015	Universitario de Deportes	102	(18)
2015–2019	Colo-Colo	18	(1)
2016-2017	→ César Vallejo (loan)	12	(0)
2017-2018	→ Sport Rosario (loan)	14	(3)
2018-2019	→ Melgar (loan)	13	(4)
2019–2022	Sporting Cristal	45	(14)
2022–2024	Al-Adalah	37	(6)
2024	Universitario de Deportes	12	(0)
2024–	Sporting Cristal	32	(10)

International career^{‡}
2013–	Peru	48	(3)
Medal record
Men's football
Representing Peru
Copa América
Runner-up	2019 Brazil
- * Club domestic league appearances and goals as of 23:47, 23 August 2025 (UTC) ‡ National team caps and goals as of 4 September 2025

Christofer Gonzáles Crespo (born 12 October 1992) is a Peruvian professional footballer who last played as a midfielder for Peruvian Liga 1 club Sporting Cristal and the Peru national team.

== Club career ==
=== Universitario de Deportes ===
Gonzáles played in the youth ranks of Universitario de Deportes. He was part of the club's U-20 team which won the 2011 U-20 Copa Libertadores. In January 2012, Gonzáles was promoted to the first team. His league debut in the Torneo Descentralizado came on 10 March 2012 in a 1–1 home draw against Sporting Cristal. On 9 February 2013, Gonzáles scored his professional goal in a 1–0 home victory against Universidad César Vallejo. He finished the 2013 season with 6 goals in 42 matches. The next year, he scored his first goal in continental competitions in the 2014 Copa Libertadores, in a 3–3 home draw against The Strongest.

=== Colo-Colo ===
In June 2015, Gonzáles’ agent José Chacón confirmed the player's arrival to Chilean powerhouse Colo-Colo for an undisclosed fee in a two-season deal. On 7 July, he was officially presented during a press conference alongside Andrés Vilches and Martín Rodríguez.

=== Club Deportivo Universidad César Vallejo ===
In June 2016 he was hired by the Peruvian team Universidad César Valejo.

=== Al-Adalah ===
On 7 July 2022, Gonzáles joined Saudi Arabian club Al-Adalah.

== International career ==
On 26 March 2013, Gonzáles scored his first goal for Peru against Trinidad and Tobago, netting the 3–0 in the first ball he touched.

== Career statistics ==
As of match played 4 September 2025

Appearances and goals by national team and year
National team	Year	Apps	Goals
Peru	2013	2	1
Peru	2014	2	0
Peru	2015	3	0
Peru	2018	2	0
Peru	2019	13	1
Peru	2020	3	0
Peru	2021	6	0
Peru	2022	11	0
Peru	2023	5	1
Peru	2025	1	0
Total		48	3

Scores and results list Peru's goal tally first, score column indicates score after each Gonzáles goal.

List of international goals scored by Christofer Gonzáles
No.	Date	Venue	Opponent	Score	Result	Competition
1	26 March 2013	Estadio Nacional, Lima, Peru	Trinidad and Tobago	3–0	3–0	Friendly
2	15 October 2019	Estadio Nacional, Lima, Peru	Uruguay	1–0	1–1	Friendly
3	20 June 2023	Panasonic Stadium Suita, Suita, Japan	Japan	1–4	1–4	2023 Kirin Challenge Cup

== Honours ==
Club Universitario de Deportes

- U-20 Copa Libertadores: 2011
- Peruvian Primera División: 2013
- Torneo Apertura: 2024

Colo-Colo

- Chilean Primera División: 2015–A, Transición 2017
- Supercopa de Chile: 2017

Sporting Cristal

- Peruvian Primera División: 2020
- Copa Bicentenario: 2021
